= Tribute to Masami Okui: Buddy =

Masami Kobushi (マサミコブシ)

Compilation album by Various artists
- Released: 25 June 2008
- Genre: J-pop
- Label: evolution

Tribute to Masami Okui ~Buddy~ is a tribute album for Japanese singer Masami Okui. It was released on June 25, 2008.

== Information ==
- To commemorate 15th anniversary since Masami Okui's debut in 1993, various anime song artists sing cover version of her previous works.

== Track listing ==
1. Trust
  - Performed by: Minami Kuribayashi
  - From 11th album God Speed
2. Rondo -revolution- (輪舞 -revolution-)
  - Performed by: Chihara Minori
  - From 3rd album Ma-KING
3. Jounetsu (情熱)
  - Performed by: Aki Misato
  - From 7th album Devotion
4. Introduction
  - Performed by: Masaaki Endoh
  - From 9th album ReBirth
5. Olive
  - Performed by: Yoko Ishida
  - From 10th album Dragonfly
6. Iiwake (いいわけ)
  - Performed by: Suara
  - From 11th album Crossroad
7. Otomegokoro Mugen (乙女心無限)
  - Performed by: Tomoe Ohmi
  - From 12th album Evolution
8. Koishimasho nebarimasho (恋しましょ ねばりましょ)
  - Performed by: Haruko Momoi
  - From 4th album Do-Can
9. Wasuregusa (ワスレグサ)
  - Performed by: Hironobu Kageyama
  - From 13th album Masami Life
10. Happy Place
  - Performed by: Chihiro Yonekura
  - From 11th album Crossroad

== Sources ==
Official website: Makusonia
