= S mode =

S mode may refer to:

- S mode (photography), shutter priority mode in electronically controlled camera
- S-mode 1, 1st single compilation album by Masami Okui
- S-mode 2, 2nd single compilation album by Masami Okui
- S-mode 3, 3rd single compilation album by Masami Okui
- Mode S, an aviation transponder interrogation mode
- Windows 10 S Mode (also in Windows 11), a variant of the Windows operating system
