= Best-Est =

Live album by Masami Okui
- Released: (Japan) 4 June 1999
- Genre: J-pop
- Length: 59:48 (disc 1), 51:58 (disc 2)
- Label: Star Child
- Producer: Masami Okui, Toshimichi Otsuki

Masami Okui chronology
Do-Can (1998)	Best-Est (1999)	Her-Day (1999)

Best-Est is the first live album by Masami Okui, released on June 4, 1999.

== Track listing ==
=== Disc 1 ===
1. Dare yori mo zutto... (誰よりもずっと...)
  - OVA Girl from Phantasia theme song
  - Lyrics: Satomi Arimori
  - Composition, arrangement: Toshiyuki Watanabe
2. Yume ni Konnichiwa -Tanoshii Willow Town- (夢にこんにちは ～ウイロータウン物語～)
  - Anime television Tanoshii Willow Town opening song
  - Lyrics: Miho Matsuba
  - Composition, arrangement: Osamu Tezuka
3. Reincarnation
  - OVA Tekkaman Blade II opening song
  - Lyrics: Satomi Arimori
  - Composition: Takashi Kudo
  - Arrangement: Toshiro Yabuki
4. My Jolly Days
  - Anime film Ghost Sweeper Mikami ending song
  - Lyrics: Keiko Kimoto
  - Composition: Tsutomu Ohira
  - Arrangement: Vink
5. It's DESTINY -Yatto Meguriaeta- (It's DESTINY ～やっと巡り会えた～)
  - OVA Tekkaman Blade II ending song
  - Lyrics: Satomi Arimori
  - Composition: Takashi Kudo
  - Arrangement: Toshiro Yabuki
6. Live Alone... Sennen tattemo (Live alone…千年たっても)
  - OVA Tekkaman Blade II ending song
  - Lyrics: Satomi Arimori
  - Composition: Takashi Kudo
  - Arrangement: Toshiro Yabuki
7. Get along
  - Masami Okui and Megumi Hayashibara
  - Anime television Slayers opening song
  - Lyrics: Satomi Arimori
  - Composition: Hidetoshi Sato
  - Arrangement: Tsutomu Ohira
8. Mask
  - Masami Okui and Kasumi Matsumura
  - Anime television Sorcerer Hunters ending song
  - Lyrics, composition: Masami Okui
  - Arrangement: Toshiro Yabuki, Tsutomu Ohira
9. Shake it
  - OVA Starship Girl Yamamoto Yohko theme song
  - Lyrics, composition: Masami Okui
  - Arrangement: Toshiro Yabuki, Tsutomu Ohira
10. Jama wa Sasenai (邪魔はさせない)
  - Anime television Slayers Next ending song
  - Lyrics: Masami Okui
  - Composition: Masami Okui, Toshiro Yabuki
  - Arrangement: Toshiro Yabuki
11. Naked Mind
  - Radio drama Slayers N.EX opening song
  - Lyrics: Masami Okui
  - Composition, arrangement: Toshiro Yabuki
12. J
  - OVA Jungle de Ikou! opening song
  - Lyrics: Masami Okui
  - Composition, arrangement: Toshiro Yabuki
13. spirit of the globe
  - OVA Jungle de Ikou! ending song
  - Lyrics, composition: Masami Okui
  - Arrangement: Toshiro Yabuki

=== Disc 2 ===
1. Rondo -revolution- (輪舞 -revolution-)
  - Anime television Revolutionary Girl Utena opening song
  - Lyrics: Masami Okui
  - Composition, arrangement: Toshiro Yabuki
2. I can't... (a.c. version)
  - Lyrics: Masami Okui
  - Composition, arrangement: Toshiro Yabuki
3. Souda, zettai. (そうだ、ぜったい。)
  - OVA Starship Girl Yamamoto Yohko opening song
  - Lyrics: Masami Okui
  - Composition, arrangement: Toshiro Yabuki
4. Birth
  - Anime television Cyber Team in Akihabara opening song
  - Lyrics: Masami Okui
  - Composition: Masami Okui, Toshiro Yabuki
  - Arrangement: Toshiro Yabuki
5. Taiyou no Hana (太陽の花)
  - Anime television Cyber Team in Akihabara ending song
  - Lyrics, composition: Masami Okui
  - Arrangement: Toshiro Yabuki
6. Shu -AKA- (朱 -AKA-)
  - Anime television Cyber Team in Akihabara soundtrack
  - Lyrics: Masami Okui
  - Composition, arrangement: Toshiro Yabuki
7. Koishimasho Nebarimasho (恋しましょ ねばりましょ)
  - Anime television Cyber Team in Akihabara soundtrack
  - Lyrics: Masami Okui
  - Composition, arrangement: Toshiro Yabuki
8. Never die
  - OVA Slayers Excellent theme song
  - Lyrics: Masami Okui
  - Composition, arrangement: Toshiro Yabuki
9. Key
  - Radio drama Cyber Team in Akihabara theme song
  - Lyrics: Masami Okui
  - Composition, arrangement: Toshiro Yabuki
10. Te no Hira no Kakera (手のひらの破片)
  - Lyrics: Masami Okui
  - Composition, arrangement: Toshiro Yabuki
11. Tenshi no Kyuusoku (天使の休息)
  - Anime television Starship Girl Yamamoto Yohko opening song
  - Lyrics: Masami Okui
  - Composition, arrangement: Toshiro Yabuki

== Sources ==
Official website: Makusonia
