= Ooku (album) =

Ooku (大奥)

Compilation album by Masami Okui
- Released: (Japan) 6 February 2008
- Genre: J-pop
- Label: evolution

Masami Okui chronology
Masami Life (2007)	Ooku (大奥) (2008)

Ooku (大奥) is the latest greatest hits album by Masami Okui, released on 6 February 2008. Ooku includes seven singles that she produced under her own record label company evolution along with three self-cover version of older songs.

== Track listing ==
1. Olive
  - Lyrics, composition: Masami Okui
  - Arrangement: Hideyuki Daichi Suzuki
  - Commercial song for Iromelo Mix
2. TRUST
  - Lyrics, composition: Masami Okui
  - Arrangement: Seikou Nagaoka
  - Opening song for anime television series He Is My Master
3. Mitsu (蜜 -mitsu-)
  - Lyrics, composition: Masami Okui
  - Arrangement: Monta
  - Theme song for DVD Drama Ray
4. zero -G-
  - Lyrics: Masami Okui
  - Composition: Monta
  - Arrangement: Hideyuki Daichi Suzuki
  - Opening song for anime television series Ray the Animation
5. Wild Spice
  - Lyrics: Masami Okui
  - Composition, arrangement: Monta
  - Opening song for anime television series Muteki Kanban Musume
6. Remote Viewing
  - Lyrics: Masami Okui
  - Composition: Michio Kinugasa
  - Arrangement: Hideyuki Daichi Suzuki
  - Opening song for PC game Routes PE and Routes Portable
7. It's my life
  - Lyrics: Masami Okui
  - Composition: Monta
  - Arrangement: Toshiro Yabuki, Tsutomu Ohira
  - Commercial song for Iromelo Mix
8. Reincarnation (self-cover version)
  - Lyrics: Satomi Arimori
  - Composition: Takashi Kudou
  - Arrangement: Toshiro Yabuki
  - Opening song for OVA Tekkaman Blade II
9. Rondo -revolution- (輪舞 -revolution) (self-cover version)
  - Lyrics: Masami Okui
  - Composition, arrangement: Toshiro Yabuki
  - Opening song for anime television series Revolutionary Girl Utena
10. Shuffle (self-cover version)
  - Lyrics: Masami Okui
  - Composition, arrangement: Toshiro Yabuki
  - Opening song for anime television series Yugi-oh! Duel Monsters

== DVD ==
Seven promo videos:

- Olive
- Trust
- Mitsu (蜜 -mitsu-)
- zero -G-
- Wild Spice
- It's my life
- -w-

== Sources ==
- Official website: Makusonia
