= Li-Book 2000 =

Live album by Masami Okui
- Released: (Japan) 22 November 2000
- Genre: J-pop
- Length: 70:20
- Label: Star Child
- Producer: Masami Okui, Toshimichi Otsuki

Masami Okui chronology
NEEI (2000)	Li-Book 2000 (2000)	S-mode #1 (2001)

Li-Book 2000 is the second live album by Masami Okui, released on November 22, 2000.

== Track listing ==
1. Turning Point
  - Lyrics: Masami Okui
  - Composition, arrangement: Toshiro Yabuki
2. Souda, zettai. (そうだ、ぜったい。)
  - OVA Starship Girl Yamamoto Yohko opening song
  - Lyrics: Masami Okui
  - Composition, arrangement: Toshiro Yabuki
3. Niji no youni (虹のように)
  - Radio drama Slayers N.EX ending song
  - Lyrics, composition: Masami Okui
  - Arrangement: Toshiro Yabuki
4. Endless Life
  - PS game Advanced V.G.2 theme song
5. Sore wa Totsuzen yattekuru (それは突然やってくる)
  - Lyrics: Masami Okui
  - Composition, arrangement: Toshiro Yabuki
6. Chaos
  - Lyrics, composition: Masami Okui
  - Arrangement: Hideki Satou
7. Cutie
  - Anime television series Di Gi Charat Summer Special 2000 opening song
  - Lyrics: Masami Okui
  - Composition, arrangement: Toshiro Yabuki
8. Rondo -revolution- (輪舞 -revolution-)
  - Anime television series Revolutionary Girl Utena opening song
  - Lyrics: Masami Okui
  - Composition, arrangement: Toshiro Yabuki
9. Kitto Ashita wa
  - Anime television series Ojamajo Doremi ending song
  - Lyrics, composition: Masami Okui
  - Arrangement: Tsutomu Ohira
10. Sunrise Sunset
  - Lyrics, composition: Masami Okui
  - Arrangement: Itaru Watanabe
11. Kiss in the Dark
  - PS game Evil Zone theme song
  - Lyrics, composition: Masami Okui
  - Arrangement: Tsutomu Ohira
12. Just do it
  - Lyrics: Masami Okui
  - Composition, arrangement: Toshiro Yabuki
13. Vitamin ~Souda, zettai.~ (ビタミン ～ぜったい、そうだ。～)
  - Lyrics: Masami Okui
  - Composition, arrangement: Toshiro Yabuki
14. Monogatari (物語) (A.C version)
  - Lyrics: Masami Okui
  - Composition: Toshiro Yabuki
  - Arrangement: Hideki Satou
15. Bay side love story ～from Tokyo～
  - Anime television series Neon Genesis Evangelion insert song
  - Lyrics, composition: Masami Okui
  - Arrangement: Toshiro Yabuki, Tsutomu Ohira

== Sources ==
Official website: Makusonia
