= S-mode 2 =

S-mode #2

Compilation album by Masami Okui
- Released: (Japan) 25 February 2004
- Genre: J-pop
- Length: 50:00 (disc 1), 47:26 (disc 2)
- Label: King Records
- Producer: Masami Okui

Masami Okui chronology
ReBirth (2004)	S-mode #2 (2004)	Dragonfly (2005)

S-mode #2 is the second single compilation album by Masami Okui, released on 25 February 2004.

== Information ==
- This album includes all songs from her singles that were released in January 1996 (9th single) until March 1999 (18th single) under King Records label.
- Each disc includes one bonus track.

== Track listing ==
=== Disc 1 ===
1. Shake it
  - OVA Starship Girl Yamamoto Yohko theme song
  - Lyrics, composition: Masami Okui
  - Arrangement: Toshiro Yabuki, Tsutomu Ohira
2. Jama wa Sasenai (邪魔はさせない)
  - Anime television series Slayers Next ending song
  - Lyrics: Masami Okui
  - Composition: Masami Okui, Toshiro Yabuki
  - Arrangement: Toshiro Yabuki
3. Naked Mind
  - Radio drama Slayers N.EX opening song
  - Lyrics: Masami Okui
  - Composition, arrangement: Toshiro Yabuki
4. J
  - OVA Jungle de Ikou! opening song
  - Lyrics: Masami Okui
  - Composition, arrangement: Toshiro Yabuki
5. Rondo -revolution- (輪舞 -revolution-)
  - Anime television series Revolutionary Girl Utena opening song
  - Lyrics: Masami Okui
  - Composition, arrangement: Toshiro Yabuki
6. Souda, zettai. (そうだ、ぜったい。)
  - OVA Starship Girl Yamamoto Yohko opening song
  - Lyrics: Masami Okui
  - Composition, arrangement: Toshiro Yabuki
7. Kitto Ashita wa
  - Anime television series Ojamajo Doremi ending song
  - Lyrics: Masami Okui
  - Composition: Masami Okui
  - Arrangement: Toshiro Yabuki
8. Birth
  - Anime television series Cyber Team in Akihabara opening song
  - Lyrics: Masami Okui
  - Composition: Masami Okui, Toshiro Yabuki
  - Arrangement: Toshiro Yabuki
9. Shu -AKA- (朱 -AKA-)
  - Anime television series CCyber Team in Akihabara soundtrack
  - Lyrics: Masami Okui
  - Composition, arrangement: Toshiro Yabuki
10. Never die
  - OVA Slayers Excellent theme song
  - Lyrics: Masami Okui
  - Composition, arrangement: Toshiro Yabuki
11. Key
  - Radio drama Cyber Team in Akihabara theme song
  - Lyrics: Masami Okui
  - Composition, arrangement: Toshiro Yabuki
12. Energy (be-show version)
  - New version of the song from her first album Gyuu
  - Lyrics, composition: Masami Okui
  - Arrangement: Nozomi Kanou, be-show

=== Disc 2 ===
1. Lonely soul
  - OVA Starship Girl Yamamoto Yohko image song
  - Lyrics: Masami Okui
  - Composition, arrangement: Tsutomu Ohira
2. Niji no youni (虹のように, Niji no youni?)
  - Radio drama Slayers N.EX ending song
  - Lyrics, composition: Masami Okui
  - Arrangement: Toshiro Yabuki
3. spirit of the globe
  - OVA Jungle de Ikou! ending song
  - Lyrics, composition: Masami Okui
  - Arrangement: Toshiro Yabuki
4. I can't...
  - Lyrics: Masami Okui
  - Composition, arrangement: Toshiro Yabuki
5. Precious wing
  - Lyrics: Masami Okui
  - Composition, arrangement: Toshiro Yabuki
6. Taiyou no Hana (太陽の花)
  - Anime television series Cyber Team in Akihabara ending song
  - Lyrics, composition: Masami Okui
  - Arrangement: Toshiro Yabuki
7. Koishimasho Nebarimasho (恋しましょ ねばりましょ)
  - Anime television series Cyber Team in Akihabara soundtrack
  - Lyrics: Masami Okui
  - Composition, arrangement: Toshiro Yabuki
8. Naritai ((なりたい)
  - Lyrics: Masami Okui
  - Composition, arrangement: Toshiro Yabuki
9. Tenohira no Kakera (手のひらの破片)
  - Lyrics: Masami Okui
  - Composition, arrangement: Toshiro Yabuki
10. Memorial Song
  - Original song
  - Lyrics, composition, arrangement: Masami Okui

== Sources ==
Official website: Makusonia
