= Her-Day =

Studio album by Masami Okui
- Released: (Japan) 27 August 1999
- Genre: J-pop
- Length: 68:48
- Label: Star Child
- Producer: Toshiro Yabuki, Toshimichi Otsuki

Masami Okui chronology
BEST-EST (1999)	Her-Day (1999)	NEEI (2000)

Her-Day is the fifth album by Masami Okui, released on August 27, 1999.

== Track listing ==
1. M2000 ~Prologue~ (instrumental)
  - Composition: Masami Okui. Toshiro Yabuki
  - Arrangement: Toshiro Yabuki
2. labyrinth (star version)
  - Anime films Cyber Team in Akihabara image song
  - Lyrics: Masami Okui
  - Composition, arrangement: Toshiro Yabuki
3. Ketsumatsu
  - Lyrics: Masami Okui
  - Composition, arrangement: Toshiro Yabuki, Hideki Sato
4. Naritai (なりたい)
  - Lyrics: Masami Okui
  - Composition, arrangement: Toshiro Yabuki
5. Ru-Ru-Ru (ルルル)
  - anime television series Starship Girl Yamamoto Yohko ending song
  - Lyrics, composition: Masami Okui
  - Arrangement: Toshiro Yabuki
6. Key
  - Radio drama Cyber Team in Akihabara theme song
  - Lyrics: Masami Okui
  - Composition, arrangement: Toshiro Yabuki
7. Makafushigu na Nanafushigi (摩訶不思議な七不思議)
  - Lyrics: Masami Okui
  - Composition: Masami Okui, Toshiro Yabuki
  - Arrangement: Toshiro Yabuki
8. Te no hira no Kakera (手のひらの破片)
  - Lyrics: Masami Okui
  - Composition, arrangement: Toshiro Yabuki
9. Last Scene (ラストシーン) (M.original mix)
  - Anime film Cyber Team in Akihabara soundtrack
  - Lyrics: Masami Okui
  - Composition, arrangement: Toshiro Yabuki
10. Tenshi no Kyuusoku (天使の休息) (type R mix)
  - anime television series Starship Girl Yamamoto Yohko opening song
  - Lyrics: Masami Okui
  - Composition, arrangement: Toshiro Yabuki
11. Love Sick
  - Lyrics, composition: Masami Okui
  - Arrangement: Toshiro Yabuki, Hideki Sato
12. Kitto Ashita wa
  - anime television series Ojamajo Doremi ending song
  - Lyrics: Masami Okui
  - Composition, arrangement: Toshiro Yabuki
13. Hot Spice (M.original mix)
  - Anime film Cyber Team in Akihabara soundtrack
  - Lyrics: Masami Okui
  - Composition, arrangement: Toshiro Yabuki
14. Toki ni Ai wa (時に愛は) (H-D mix)
  - Anime film Revolutionary Girl Utena soundtrack
  - Lyrics: Masami Okui
  - Composition, arrangement: Toshiro Yabuki
15. In This Arm
  - anime television series Slayers image song
  - Lyrics, composition: Masami Okui
  - Arrangement: Toshiro Yabuki
16. Never die
  - OVA Slayers Excellent theme song
  - Lyrics: Masami Okui
  - Composition, arrangement: Toshiro Yabuki
17. Maria (マリア)
  - Lyrics, composition: Masami Okui
  - Arrangement: Tsutomu Ohira

== Sources ==
Official website: Makusonia
