= V-sit =

Studio album by Masami Okui
- Released: (Japan) 21 September 1996
- Genre: J-pop
- Length: 68:10
- Label: Star Child
- Producer: Toshiro Yabuki, Toshimichi Otsuki

Masami Okui chronology
Gyuu (1995)	V-sit (1996)	Ma-KING (1997)

V-sit is the second album by Masami Okui, released on September 21, 1996.

== Track listing ==
1. Mask (masamix)
  - Anime television series Sorcerer Hunters ending song
  - Lyrics, composition: Masami Okui
  - Arrangement: Toshiro Yabuki, Tsutomu Ohira
2. Saiko no Gamble (最高のGAMBLE)
  - Radio drama Slayers EX image song
  - Lyrics, composition: Masami Okui
  - Arrangement: Toshiro Yabuki
3. Shake it
  - OVA Starship Girl Yamamoto Yohko theme song
  - Lyrics, composition: Masami Okui
  - Arrangement: Toshiro Yabuki, Tsutomu Ohira
4. Uso no Egao, Hontou no Namida (嘘の笑顔 本当の涙)
  - Lyrics, composition: Masami Okui
  - Arrangement: Toshiro Yabuki, Tsutomu Ohira
5. Lonely soul
  - OVA Starship Girl Yamamoto Yohko image song
  - Lyrics: Masami Okui
  - Composition, arrangement: Tsutomu Ohira
6. Dreaming Heart
  - OVA Megami Paradise ending song
  - Lyrics: Keiko Kimoto
  - Composition: Gota Wakabayashi
  - Arrangement: Tsutomu Ohira
7. Futari (二人)
  - Lyrics, composition: Masami Okui
  - Arrangement: Tsutomu Ohira
8. Love is Fire
  - Lyrics: Masami Okui
  - Composition: Tsutomu Ohira
  - Arrangement: Toshiro Yabuki, Tsutomu Ohira
9. Get My Way
  - OVA Megami Paradise opening song
  - Lyrics: Narumi Yamamoto
  - Composition, arrangement: Toshiro Yabuki
10. Senjou no Madonna (戦場のマドンナ)
  - Radio drama Slayers EX image song
  - Lyrics: Masami Okui
  - Composition, arrangement: Tsutomu Ohira
11. Ryouki ~Heaven & Hell~ (領域〜Heaven&Hell〜))
  - Radio drama Sorcerer Hunters SP image song
  - Originally sung by Yuko Mizutani
  - Lyrics, composition: Masami Okui
  - Arrangement: Toshiro Yabuki
12. Majime na Kikkake
  - Radio drama Slayers EX image song
  - Lyrics, composition: Masami Okui
  - Arrangement: Toshiro Yabuki
13. Jama wa Sasenai (邪魔はさせない) (live rock on)
  - Anime television series Slayers Next ending song
  - Lyrics: Masami Okui
  - Composition: Masami Okui, Toshiro Yabuki
  - Arrangement: Toshiro Yabuki
14. Friends
  - Lyrics: Masami Okui
  - Composition, arrangement: Tsutomu Ohira

== Sources ==
Official website: Makusonia
