= Tekkaman =

Tekkaman may refer to

- Tekkaman: The Space Knight, a 26-episode anime produced by Tatsunoko Productions in 1975.
- Tekkaman Blade, the 49-episode reboot of the original anime series, released in 1992.
- Tekkaman Blade II, a 6-episode OVA based on the 1992 anime series, released in 1994.
- Uchū no Kishi: Tekkaman Blade, a scrolling shooter game based on the 1992 anime series, released in 1993.
