= Rondo-Revolution =

Single by Masami Okui

Single by Masami Okui

from the album Ma-KING
- Released: May 21, 1997
- Genre: Pop
- Length: 4:33
- Label: Starchild Records
- Songwriters: Masami Okui; Toshiro Yabuki
- Producer: Toshiro Yabuki

Masami Okui singles chronology
"J" (1997)	"Rondo-Revolution" (1997)	"Sō da, Zettai." (1997)

Audio sample
- "Rondo-Revolution": file; help

"Rondo-Revolution" (輪舞(ロンド)-revolution) is a song recorded by Japanese singer Masami Okui, from the album Ma-KING. It was released as the album's third single on May 21, 1997, through Starchild Records. The title track is the theme song to the TX anime series Revolutionary Girl Utena. It was also featured in the animated film Adolescence of Utena. A double A-side CD single featuring both "Rondo-Revolution" and the ending theme to Revolutionary Girl Utena, "Truth" by Luca Yumi, was released simultaneously by Starchild Records.

== Background ==
"Rondo-Revolution" was written by Okui and composed, arranged and produced by Toshiro Yabuki. The title of the song constitutes an ateji pronunciation of the kanji 輪舞 (rinbu) as the musical term Rondo. The director of Revolutionary Girl Utena Kunihiko Ikuhara revealed in a blog entry about the song that its initial working title was "Take my revolution".

== Composition ==
The song is composed in the key of D minor and set to a tempo of 132 beats per minute. Okui's vocals span from A_{3} to F_{5}.

== Chart performance ==
"Rondo-Revolution" (KIDA-149) debuted at number 43 on the weekly Oricon Singles Chart, with 8,000 copies sold. The single charted for two weeks and sold a reported total of 12,000 copies. The double A-side version (KIDA-151) of the single entered the Oricon Singles Chart at number 26, with 16,000 copies sold. It charted for four consecutive weeks and sold a reported total of 34,000 copies.

== Track listing ==
All tracks are written by Masami Okui and Toshiro Yabuki.

No.	Title	Arranger(s)	Length
1.	"Rondo-Revolution" (輪舞-revolution)	Toshiro Yabuki	4:33
2.	"I Can't..."	Yabuki	5:34
3.	"Rondo-Revolution" (Off Vocal Version)	Yabuki	4:33
4.	"I Can't..." (Off Vocal Version)	Yabuki	5:34
Total length:			20:14

"Rondo-Revolution" / "Truth" edition
No.	Title	Writer(s)	Performers(s)	Length
1.	"Rondo-Revolution" (輪舞-revolution)	Masami Okui; Toshiro Yabuki	Masami Okui	4:33
2.	"Truth"	Shōko Fujibayashi; Riki Arai	Luca Yumi	5:34
Total length:				9:00

== Charts ==
=== "Rondo-Revolution" edition ===
Chart (1997)	Peak position
Japan Weekly Singles (Oricon)	43

=== "Rondo-Revolution" / "Truth" edition ===
Chart (1997)	Peak position
Japan Weekly Singles (Oricon)	26

== Sales ==
Region	Certification	Certified units/sales
Japan	—	46,000
