= Gyuu =

Studio album by Masami Okui
- Released: (Japan) 21 April 1995
- Genre: J-pop
- Length: 63:54
- Label: Star Child

Masami Okui chronology
Gyuu (1995)	V-sit (1996)

Gyuu is the first studio album by Masami Okui, released on April 21, 1995.

== Information ==
- Includes a self-cover of the first song that Masami Okui composed and wrote the lyrics herself Moonlight Angel ~Ashita ni Mukatte~ (Moonlight Angel〜明日に向かって〜).

== Track listing ==
1. Reincarnation
  - OVA Tekkaman Blade II opening song
  - Lyrics: Satomi Arimori
  - Composition: Takashi Kudo
  - Arrangement: Toshiro Yabuki
2. Moonlight Angel ~Ashita ni Mukatte~ (Moonlight Angel〜明日に向かって〜)
  - Cover of Mariko Koda's character song in OVA Tekkaman Blade II
  - Lyrics, composition: Masami Okui
  - Arrangement: Toshiro Yabuki
3. I Was Born to Fall In Love
  - OVA Compiler opening song
  - Lyrics: Satomi Arimori
  - Composition, arrangement: Hideya Nakazaki
4. Ryoute ippai no Yume (両手いっぱいの夢)
  - OVA Tekkaman Blade II image song
  - Lyrics: Satomi Arimori
  - Composition: Takashi Kudo
  - Arrangement: Masami Okui
5. Full Up Mind
  - OVA Compiler ending song
  - Lyrics: Satomi Arimori
  - Composition, arrangement: Hideya Nakazaki
6. Beats the Band
  - Anime film Ghost Sweeper Mikami soundtrack
  - Lyrics: Mamie D. Lee
  - Composition: Makoto Ikenaga
  - Arrangement: Vink
7. Face
  - Cover for Saeko Shimazu's character song in OVA All Purpose Cultural Cat Girl Nuku Nuku
  - Lyrics: Satomi Arimori
  - Composition, arrangement: Tsutomu Ohira
8. Fushigi na Yoru (不思議な夜)
  - Original song Okui made specially for this album
  - Lyrics, composition: Masami Okui
  - Arrangement: Toshiro Yabuki
9. My Jolly Days
  - Anime film Ghost Sweeper Mikami ending song
  - Lyrics: Keiko Kimoto
  - Composition: Tsutomu Ohira
  - Arrangement: Vink
10. It's Destiny -yatto meguriaeta- (It's DESTINY -やっと巡り会えた-)
  - OVA Tekkaman Blade II ending song
  - Lyrics: Satomi Arimori
  - Composition: Takashi Kudo
  - Arrangement: Toshiro Yabuki
11. Energy
  - OVA Megami Paradise image song
  - Lyrics, composition: Masami Okui
  - Arrangement: Toshiro Yabuki
12. Live Alone... Sennen tattemo (Live alone...千年たっても)
  - OVA Tekkaman Blade II ending song
  - Lyrics: Satomi Arimori
  - Composition: Takashi Kudo
  - Arrangement: Toshiro Yabuki
13. Dare yori mo zutto... (誰よりもずっと...)
  - OVA Girl from Fantasia theme song
  - Lyrics: Satomi Arimori
  - Composition, arrangement: Toshiyuki Watanabe
14. Bay side love story -from tokyo-
  - Lyrics, composition: Masami Okui
  - Arrangement: Toshiro Yabuki, Tsutomu Ohira
  - TV anime Neon Genesis Evangelion (anime) insert song

== Sources ==
Official website: Makusonia
