= S-mode 1 =

S-mode #1

Compilation album by Masami Okui
- Released: (Japan) 21 March 2001
- Genre: J-pop
- Length: 63:42 (disc 1), 37:40 (disc 2)
- Label: Star Child
- Producer: Toshiro Yabuki, Toshimichi Otsuki

Masami Okui chronology
Li-Book 2000 (2000)	S-mode #1 (2001)	Devotion (2001)

S-mode #1 is the first single compilation album by Masami Okui, released on 21 March 2001. It is J-pop genre.

== Information ==
- Disc-1 includes all songs from her singles that were released in August 1993 (1st single) until November 1995 (8th single) under King Records label.
- Disc-2 includes 7 self-cover of songs she made for other artists and a bonus track.
- This album was released together with her 28th single Megami ni Naritai -for a yours- (女神になりたい)

== Track listing ==
=== Disc 1 ===
1. Dare yori mo zutto... (誰よりもずっと...)
  - OVA Fantasia theme song
  - Lyrics: Satomi Arimori
  - Composition, arrangement: Toshiyuki Watanabe
2. Yume ni Konnichiwa -Tanoshii Willow Town- (夢にこんにちは -楽しいウイロータウン-)
  - Anime television series Tanoshii Willow Town opening song
  - Lyrics: Miho Matsuba
  - Composition, arrangement: Osamu Tezuka
3. Liverpool e Oide (リバプールへおいで)
  - Anime television series Tanoshii Willow Town ending song
  - Lyrics: Miho Matsuba
  - Composition, arrangement: Osamu Tezuka
4. I Was Born to Fall In Love
  - OVA Compiler opening song
  - Lyrics: Satomi Arimori
  - Composition, arrangement: Hideya Nakazaki
5. Full Up Mind
  - OVA Compiler ending song
  - Lyrics: Satomi Arimori
  - Composition, arrangement: Hideya Nakazaki
6. Reincarnation
  - OVA Tekkaman Blade II opening song
  - Lyrics: Satomi Arimori
  - Composition: Takashi Kudo
  - Arrangement: Toshiro Yabuki
7. Ryoute ippai no Yume (両手いっぱいの夢)
  - OVA Tekkaman Blade II image song
  - Lyrics: Satomi Arimori
  - Composition: Takashi Kudo
  - Arrangement: Masami Okui
8. My Jolly Days
  - Anime film Ghost Sweeper Mikami ending song
  - Lyrics: Keiko Kimoto
  - Composition: Tsutomu Ohira
  - Arrangement: Vink
9. Beats the Band
  - Anime film Ghost Sweeper Mikami soundtrack
  - Lyrics: Mamie D. Lee
  - Composition: Makoto Ikenaga
  - Arrangement: Vink
10. It's DESTINY -Yatto Meguri Ae ta- (It's DESTINY ～やっと巡り会えた～)
  - OVA Tekkaman Blade II ending song
  - Lyrics: Satomi Arimori
  - Composition: Takashi Kudo
  - Arrangement: Toshiro Yabuki
11. Live Alone... Sennen tattemo (Live alone…千年たっても)
  - OVA Tekkaman Blade II ending song
  - Lyrics: Satomi Arimori
  - Composition: Takashi Kudo
  - Arrangement: Toshiro Yabuki
12. Get along
  - With Megumi Hayashibara
  - Anime television series Slayers opening song
  - Lyrics: Satomi Arimori
  - Composition: Hidetoshi Sato
  - Arrangement: Tsutomu Ohira
13. Kujikenaikara!
  - With Megumi Hayashibara
  - Anime television series Slayers ending song
  - Lyrics: Satomi Arimori
  - Composition: Masami Okui
  - Arrangement: Toshiro Yabuki
14. Mask
  - Anime television series Sorcerer Hunters ending song
  - Lyrics, composition: Masami Okui
  - Arrangement: Toshiro Yabuki, Tsutomu Ohira
15. Love is Fire
  - Lyrics: Masami Okui
  - Composition: Tsutomu Ohira
  - Arrangement: Toshiro Yabuki, Tsutomu Ohira

=== Disc 2 ===
1. Ranbu (乱舞)
  - Lyrics, composition: Masami Okui
  - Arrangement: Toshiro Yabuki
2. Issho ni (いっしょに)
  - Lyrics: Masami Okui
  - Composition, arrangement: Tsutomu Ohira
3. But But But
  - Lyrics, composition: Masami Okui
  - Arrangement: Tsutomu Ohira
4. 1 2 3
  - Lyrics: Masami Okui
  - Composition, arrangement: Hideki Sato
5. Ame no Faraway (雨のFaraway)
  - Lyrics: Satomi Arimori
  - Composition: Masami Okui
  - Arrangement: System-B
6. Secret ~Dare ka no Message~ (Secret〜誰かのメッセージ〜)
  - Lyrics, composition: Masami Okui
  - Arrangement: Tsutomu Ohira
7. Someday
  - Lyrics: Masami Okui
  - Composition, arrangement: Hideki Sato
8. Sennichite (千日手)
  - Original song
  - Lyrics, composition: Masami Okui
  - Arrangement: System-B
