= God Speed (album) =

Studio album by Masami Okui
- Released: (Japan) 24 February 2006
- Genre: J-pop
- Length: 57:25
- Label: evolution
- Producer: Masami Okui

Masami Okui chronology
S-mode #3 (2005)	God Speed (2006)	Evolution (2006)

God Speed is the 11th album by Masami Okui, released on 24 February 2006.

== Track listing ==
1. Wild Cat
  - Lyrics: Masami Okui
  - Composition: IPPEI
  - Arrangement: Nils
2. Subliminal
  - Lyrics: Masami Okui
  - Composition, arrangement: Monta
3. God Speed
  - Lyrics: Masami Okui
  - Composition: Monta
  - Arrangement: Hideyuki Daichi Suzuki
4. Mitsu (蜜 -mitsu-)
  - DVD Drama RAY theme song
  - Lyrics, composition: Masami Okui
  - Arrangement: Monta
5. Red
  - Lyrics, composition: Masami Okui
  - Arrangement: Shunsuke Suzuki
6. Last Sun
  - Lyrics: Masami Okui
  - Composition, arrangement: Hiroshi Uesugi
7. Timeliness
  - Lyrics: Masami Okui
  - Composition: Daiju Takato, Masami Okui
  - Arrangement: Daiju Takato
8. Paradise Lost
  - Lyrics: Masami Okui
  - Composition, arrangement: Macaroni
9. Pride
  - Lyrics, composition: Masami Okui
  - Arrangement: Monta
10. Gift
  - DVD Drama Gift theme song
  - Lyrics, composition: Masami Okui
  - Arrangement: Takahito Eguchi
11. Moeyo! Generation (燃えよ！Generation)
  - Lyrics: Masami Okui
  - Composition, arrangement: Macaroni
12. Trust (Session Mix)
  - anime television series He Is My Master opening song
  - Lyrics, composition: Masami Okui
  - Arrangement: Seikou Nagaoka, Daiju Takato

== Sources ==
Official website: Makusonia
