= Ma-KING =

Studio album by Masami Okui
- Released: (Japan) 26 September 1997
- Genre: J-pop
- Length: 70:56
- Label: Star Child
- Producer: Toshiro Yabuki, Toshimichi Otsuki

Masami Okui chronology
V-sit (1996)	Ma-KING (1997)	Do-Can (1998)

Ma-KING is the third album by Masami Okui, released on September 26, 1997.

== Track listing ==
1. endless life
  - Movie Love & Pop image song
  - PS game Advanced V.G 2 theme song
  - Lyrics: Masami Okui
  - Composition: Masami Okui, Toshiro Yabuki
  - Arrangement: Toshiro Yabuki
2. Souda, zettai. (そうだ、ぜったい。)
  - OVA Starship Girl Yamamoto Yohko opening song
  - Lyrics: Masami Okui
  - Composition, arrangement: Toshiro Yabuki
3. A&C
  - Lyrics, composition: Masami Okui
  - Arrangement: Tsutomu Ohira
4. Process
  - Radio drama Slayers N.EX image song
  - Lyrics, composition: Masami Okui
  - Arrangement: Tsutomu Ohira
5. Niji no youni (虹のように)
  - Radio drama Slayers N.EX ending song
  - Lyrics, composition: Masami Okui
  - Arrangement: Toshiro Yabuki
6. Spicy Essence
  - Lyrics, composition: Masami Okui
  - Arrangement: Tsutomu Ohira
7. Naked Mind (dynamix)
  - Radio drama Slayers N.EX opening song
  - Lyrics: Masami Okui
  - Composition, arrangement: Toshiro Yabuki
8. Precious wing (light wind version)
  - Lyrics: Masami Okui
  - Composition, arrangement: Toshiro Yabuki
9. more than words ～in my heart～
  - Lyrics: Yukiko Sato (Japanese lyrics: Masami Okui)
  - Composition: Masami Okui
  - Arrangement: Tsutomu Ohira
10. I can't... (daydremix)
  - Lyrics: Masami Okui
  - Composition, arrangement: Toshiro Yabuki
11. J (wild beat version)
  - OVA Jungle de Ikou! opening song
  - Lyrics: Masami Okui
  - Composition, arrangement: Toshiro Yabuki
12. Rondo -revolution- (輪舞 -revolution-) (red rose version)
  - Anime television series Revolutionary Girl Utena opening song
  - Lyrics: Masami Okui
  - Composition, arrangement: Toshiro Yabuki
13. spirit of the globe
  - OVA Jungle de Ikou! ending song
  - Lyrics, composition: Masami Okui
  - Arrangement: Toshiro Yabuki
14. Kaze ni fukarete (風に吹かれて)
  - Lyrics, composition: Masami Okui
  - Arrangement: Tsutomu Ohira

== Sources ==
Official website: Makusonia
