= S-mode 3 =

S-mode #3

Compilation album by Masami Okui
- Released: (Japan) 23 February 2005
- Genre: J-pop
- Length: 67:36 (disc 1), 56:24 (disc 2)
- Label: King Records
- Producer: Masami Okui

Masami Okui chronology
Dragonfly (2005)	S-mode #3 (2005)	God Speed (2006)

S-mode #3 is the third single compilation album by Masami Okui, released on 23 February 2005.

== Information ==
- This album includes all songs from her singles that were released in May 1999 (19th single) until November 2003 (32nd single) under King Records label.
- There is a bonus track in disc 2, Okui's self-cover of Transmigration, a song she made for Nana Mizuki.

== Track listing ==
=== Disc 1 ===
1. Tenshi no Kyuusoku (天使の休息)
  - Anime television series Starship Girl Yamamoto Yohko opening song
  - Lyrics: Masami Okui
  - Composition, arrangement: Toshiro Yabuki
2. Labyrinth
  - Movie anime Cyber Team in Akihabara image song
  - Lyrics: Masami Okui
  - Composition, arrangement: Toshiro Yabuki
3. Toki ni Ai wa (時に愛は)
  - Movie anime Shōjo Kakumei Utena soundtrack
  - Lyrics: Masami Okui
  - Composition, arrangement: Toshiro Yabuki
4. Sore wa Totsuzen yattekuru (それは突然やってくる)
  - Lyrics: Masami Okui
  - Composition, arrangement: Toshiro Yabuki
5. Only One, No. 1
  - Anime television series Di Gi Charat opening song
  - Lyrics: Masami Okui
  - Composition, arrangement: Toshiro Yabuki
6. Over the End
  - Lyrics: Masami Okui
  - Composition, arrangement: Toshiro Yabuki
7. Turning Point
  - Lyrics: Masami Okui
  - Composition, arrangement: Toshiro Yabuki
8. Cutie
  - Anime television series Di Gi Charat Summer Special 2000 opening song
  - Lyrics: Masami Okui
  - Composition, arrangement: Toshiro Yabuki
9. Just do it
  - Lyrics: Masami Okui
  - Composition, arrangement: Toshiro Yabuki
10. Sora ni Kakeru Hashi (空にかける橋)
  - Anime television series Tales of Eternia opening song
  - Lyrics, composition: Masami Okui
  - Arrangement: Toshiro Yabuki
11. Megami ni naritai -for a yours- (女神になりたい ～for a yours～)
  - Anime television series Di Gi Charat Christmas Special, Ohanami Special, Natsuyasumi Special opening song
  - Lyrics: Masami Okui
  - Composition, arrangement: Toshiro Yabuki
12. Shuffle
  - Anime television series Yu-Gi-Oh! Duel Monsters opening song
  - Lyrics: Masami Okui
  - Composition, arrangement: Toshiro Yabuki
13. DEPORTATION -but, never too late-
  - Lyrics, composition: Masami Okui
  - Arrangement: Topbeam
14. HAPPY PLACE
  - Lyrics, composition: Masami Okui
  - Arrangement: Dry
15. Second Impact
  - Lyrics, composition: Masami Okui
  - Arrangement: Toshiro Yabuki

=== Disc 2 ===
1. Ru-Ru-Ru (ルルル)
  - Anime television series Starship Girl Yamamoto Yohko ending song
  - Lyrics, composition: Masami Okui
  - Arrangement: Toshiro Yabuki
2. eternal promise [Deck version]
  - Lyrics: Masami Okui
  - Composition: Masami Okui, Toshiro Yabuki
  - Arrangement: Hideki Satou
3. Moon
  - Lyrics, composition: Masami Okui
  - Arrangement: Hideki Satou
4. Chaos
  - Lyrics, composition: Masami Okui
  - Arrangement: Hideki Satou
5. I'd love you to touch me
  - Anime television series Tales of Eternia ending song
  - Lyrics, composition: Masami Okui
  - Arrangement: System-B
6. Ano hi no Gogo (あの日の午後)
  - Anime television series Yu-Gi-Oh! Duel Monsters ending song
  - Lyrics: Masami Okui
  - Composition, arrangement: Toshiro Yabuki
7. Jounetsu (情熱)
  - Lyrics, composition: Masami Okui
  - Arrangement: Yuugo Maeda
8. Iiwake (いいわけ)
  - Lyrics, composition: Masami Okui
  - Arrangement: Yamachi
9. Pure
  - Lyrics: Masami Okui
  - Composition: Naozumi Takahashi
  - Arrangement: Tsutomu Ohira
10. Message
  - Lyrics: Masami Okui
  - Composition, arrangement: Monta
11. Transmigration
  - Lyrics: Masami Okui
  - Composition, arrangement: Toshiro Yabuki
  - Originally sung by Nana Mizuki

== Sources ==
Official website: Makusonia
