= Masami Okui =

Japanese singer and songwriter

Masami Okui 奥井 雅美
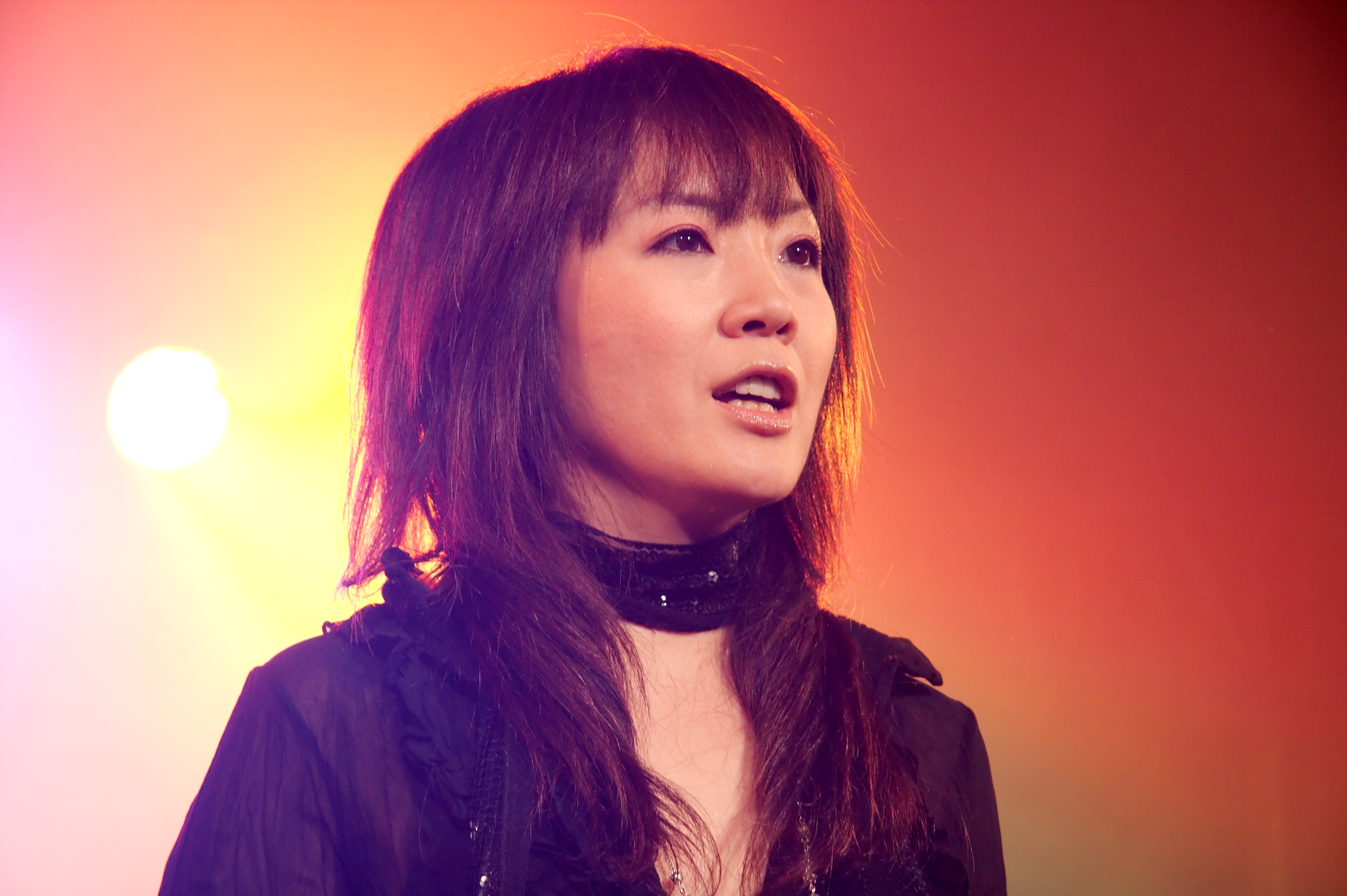
- Okui performing as part of JAM Project in Paris

Background information
- Born: March 13, 1966 (age 60); Itami, Hyōgo, Japan
- Genres: Japanese pop; Anison; rock
- Occupations: Singer; songwriter
- Instruments: Vocals; drums; percussion; guitar
- Years active: 1993–present
- Labels: Starchild; King; evolution; Lantis
- Website: makusonia.com

Masami Okui (奥井 雅美, Okui Masami; born March 13, 1966) is a Japanese singer and songwriter from Itami, Hyōgo. She began her professional musical career at age 21 as a concert backup singer. From almost the very beginning of her career, Masami has sung themes for anime television and movies. She is especially well known for her songs from Revolutionary Girl Utena, Tales of Eternia The Animation, Slayers, Sorcerer Hunters, Di Gi Charat, Magical DoReMi, Magic User's Club, Jungle de Ikou!, Akihabara Dennou Gumi, Ray the Animation, He Is My Master and Yu-Gi-Oh! Duel Monsters. She has performed material for more than 50 singles and 20 albums to date (including her work with JAM Project and Chihiro Yonekura). Okui hosts @Tunes, an anime music news program, on the Japanese anime television network Animax.

== Biography ==
Okui began her music career as a concert backup singer for Yuki Saito in November 1989. Her first solo single "Dare Yori mo Zutto" was released in 1993, and was used as a theme song for the anime OAV The Girl from Phantasia. She sang with voice actress Megumi Hayashibara for the anime television series Slayers in 1995. In 2003, she teamed up with fellow artist Chihiro Yonekura to form the group r.o.r/s, an acronym for "Reflections of Renaissance/Sounds". She also became a member of the supergroup JAM Project, which released the single "Little Wing" that served as the opening theme song for the anime television series Scrapped Princess. She left Starchild Records and produced her own record label called "evolution", which lasted from 2003. In 2011, she ended her evolution label, left Geneon Universal Entertainment, and signed with Lantis.

Okui is a regular performer in the Animelo Summer Live annual concerts from "The Bridge" in 2005 to "Rainbow" in 2011. In October 2008, she went to Mexico with JAM Project where they performed at the Expo TNT 16. She also performed in 2012 for EXPO TNT GT 6.

== Discography ==
=== Studio albums ===
List of albums, with selected chart positions
Title	Album information	Oricon peak position
Gyuu	Release date: April 21, 1995; Label: Starchild; Cat. No.: KICS-482	47
V-sit	Release date: September 21, 1996; Label: Starchild; Cat. No.: KICS-586	19
Ma-KING	Release date: September 26, 1997; Label: Starchild; Cat. No.: KICS-642	12
Do-Can	Release date: September 23, 1998; Label: Starchild; Cat. No.: KICS-695	12
Her-Day	Release date: August 27, 1999; Label: Starchild; Cat. No.: KICS-744	18
NEEI	Release date: August 23, 2000; Label: Starchild; Cat. No.: KICS-822	11
Devotion	Release date: August 29, 2001; Label: Starchild; Cat. No.: KICS-890	30
Crossroad	Release date: September 4, 2002; Label: King Records; Cat. No.: KICS-964	34
Masami Kobushi (マサミコブシ)	Release date: May 1, 2003; Label: Starchild; Cat. No.: KICS-1017	17
ReBirth	Release date: February 4, 2004; Label: King Records; Cat. No.: KICS-1061	49
Dragonfly	Release date: February 2, 2005; Label: evolution; Cat. No.: EVCA-0001	68
God Speed	Release date: February 24, 2006; Label: evolution; Cat. No.: EVCA-0002	111
Evolution	Release date: October 4, 2006; Label: evolution; Cat. No.: EVCA-0003	60
Masami Life	Release date: October 3, 2007; Label: evolution; Cat. No.: EVCA-0005	110
Akasha	Release date: February 25, 2009; Label: evolution; Cat. No. EVCA-0010	68
Self Satisfaction	Release date: August 21, 2009; Label: evolution; Cat. No.: EVCA-0014; 1st album full of self-cover songs	127
i-magination	Release date: February 23, 2010; Label: Dwango User Entertainment; Cat. No.: DGEA-10001	95
Self Satisfaction II	Release date: February 2, 2011; Label: Dwango User Entertainment; Cat. No.: DGEA-10002; 2nd album full of self-cover songs	113
Love Axel	Release date: July 4, 2012; Label: Lantis; Cat. No.: LACA-35215	43
Symbolic Bride	Release date: June 10, 2015; Label: Lantis; Cat. No.: LACA-15487	65
Happy End	Release date: August 21, 2018; Label: Lantis; Cat. No.: LACA-15740	74

=== Compilation albums ===
List of albums, with selected chart positions
Title	Album information	Oricon Peak position
BEST-EST	Release date: June 4, 1999; Label: Starchild; Cat. No.: KICS-723/4; 1st live album	21
Li-Book 2000	Release date: November 22, 2000; Label: Starchild; Cat. No.: KICS-831; 2nd live album	61
S-mode#1	Release date: March 21, 2001; Label: Starchild; Cat. No.: KICS-873/4; 1st compilation album	26
S-mode#2	Release date: February 25, 2004; Label: King Records; Cat. No.: KICS-1068/9; 2nd compilation album	50
S-mode#3	Release date: February 23, 2005; Label: King Records; Cat. No.: KICS-1148/9; 3rd compilation album	76
Ooku (大奥)	Release date: February 6, 2008; Label: evolution; Cat. No.: EVCA-0006	78

=== Other albums ===
List of albums, with selected chart positions
Title	Album information	Oricon Peak position
Angel's Voice	Release date: November 22, 2002; Label: King Records; Cat. No.: KICS-982; 1st mini-album	67

=== Singles ===
List of singles, with selected chart positions
Year	Title / Notes	Oricon peak position	Album
1993	"Dare yori mo zutto..." (誰よりもずっと…)	—	Gyuu
1993	"Yume ni Konnichiwa -Tanoshii Willow Town-"	—	BEST-EST
1994	"I Was Born To Fall in Love"	92	Gyuu
1994	"Reincarnation"	83	Gyuu
1994	"My Jolly Days"	92	Gyuu
1994	"It's Destiny"	80	Gyuu
1995	"Get Along" (featuring Megumi Hayashibara)	36	BEST-EST
1995	"Mask" (featuring Kasumi Matsumura)	48	V-sit
1996	"Shake It"	81	V-sit
1996	"Jama wa Sasenai"	9	V-sit
1996	"Naked Mind"	38	Ma-KING
1997	"J"	79	Ma-KING
1997	"Rondo-Revolution"	26	Ma-KING
1997	"Souda, zettai."	45	Ma-KING
1998	"Birth"	32	Do-Can
1998	"Shu -Aka"	32	Do-Can
1998	"Never Die"	32	Her-Day
1999	"Key"	49	Her-Day
1999	"Tenshi no Kyuusoku"	20	Her-Day
1999	"Kitto Ashita wa"	51	Her-Day
1999	"Labyrinth/Toki ni Ai wa"	29	
1999	"Sore wa Totsuzen Yattekuru"	44	NEEI
1999	"Only One, No. 1"	34	NEEI
2000	"Over The End"	45	NEEI
2000	"Turning Point"	47	NEEI
2000	"Cutie"	45	NEEI
2000	"Just Do It"	60	NEEI
2001	"Sora ni Kakeru Hashi"	28	Devotion
2001	"Megami ni Naritai ~for a yours~"	43	Devotion
2001	"Shuffle"	55	Devotion
2001	"Deportation: but, never too late"	53	Devotion
2002	"Happy Place"	86	Crossroad
2003	"Second Impact"	56	ReBirth
2004	"Olive"	69	Dragonfly
2005	"Trust"	37	God Speed
2006	"Mitsu"	79	God Speed
2006	"Zero -G-"	64	Evolution
2006	"Wild Spice"	82	Evolution
2007	"Remote Viewing"	96	Masami Life
2007	"It's My Life"	97	Masami Life
2007	"Ring"	160	Masami Life
2007	"Insanity"	57	Akasha
2008	"Melted Snow"	121	Akasha
2009	"Starting Over"	92	i-magination
2009	"Miracle Upper WL" (featuring May'n)	67	i-magination
2009	"Sparking/No Dream, No Life"	—	—
2010	"Renka Tairan"	35	Love Axel
2012	"Sora no Uta"	38	Love Axel
2015	"Takarabako -TREASURE BOX-"	15	Symbolic Bride
2017	"Innocent Bubble"	124	HAPPY END
2017	"Sophia"	152	HAPPY END

=== Videos ===
Star Child

1. Ma-KING Concert '97
2. Do-can Diary
3. A-Day
4. Live in Hibiya -no cut-
5. B-Day
6. Document '00
7. Birth Live '01
8. C-Day
9. Live Devotion

King Records

1. V-mode −10th Anniversary-

Evolution

1. GIGS 2004 ReBirth
2. GIGS 2005 Dragonfly
3. GIGS 2006 GodSpeed
4. GIGS 2006 Evolution
