= Do-Can =

Studio album by Masami Okui
- Released: (Japan) 23 September 1998
- Genre: J-pop
- Length: 53:34
- Label: Star Child
- Producer: Toshiro Yabuki, Toshimichi Otsuki

Masami Okui chronology
Ma-KING (1997)	Do-Can (1998)	BEST-EST (1999)

Do-Can is the fourth album by Masami Okui, released on September 23, 1998.

== Track listing ==
1. Makoon ~1999~ (instrumental)
  - Composition, arrangement: Tsutomu Ohira
  - Chorus: Masami Okui
2. Shu -AKA- (朱 -AKA-) (L.A. version)
  - anime television Cyber Team in Akihabara soundtrack
  - Lyrics: Masami Okui
  - Composition, arrangement: Toshiro Yabuki
3. Kiss in the dark
  - PS game Evil Zone theme song
  - Lyrics, composition: Masami Okui
  - Arrangement: Tsutomu Ohira
4. BIG-3
  - Lyrics: Masami Okui
  - Composition, arrangement: Toshiro Yabuki
  - Chorus: Toshiro Yabuki
5. Taiyou no Hana (太陽の花) (isamix)
  - anime television Cyber Team in Akihabara ending song
  - Lyrics, composition: Masami Okui
  - Arrangement: Toshiro Yabuki
6. Shiawasette... (幸せって...)
  - Lyrics, composition: Masami Okui
  - Arrangement: Tsutomu Ohira
7. Eve
  - Lyrics, composition: Masami Okui
  - Arrangement: Tsutomu Ohira
  - Chorus: Toshiro Yabuki, Tsutomu Ohira
8. Climax
  - Lyrics: Masami Okui
  - Composition, arrangement: Toshiro Yabuki
9. Birth (takemix)
  - anime television Cyber Team in Akihabara opening song
  - Lyrics: Masami Okui
  - Composition: Masami Okui, Toshiro Yabuki
  - Arrangement: Toshiro Yabuki
10. Vitamin ~Souda, zettai.~ (ビタミン 〜ぜったい、そうだ。〜)
  - Extra compilation for Souda, zettai.
  - Lyrics: Masami Okui
  - Composition, arrangement: Toshiro Yabuki
11. Koishimasho Nebarimasho (恋しましょ ねばりましょ) (daitamix)
  - Radio drama Cyber Team in Akihabara theme
  - Lyrics: Masami Okui
  - Composition, arrangement: Toshiro Yabuki
12. Dareka ga Dareka wo (誰かが 誰かを)
  - Lyrics, composition: Masami Okui
  - Arrangement: Tsutomu Ohira

== Sources ==
Official website: Makusonia
