= Masami Kobushi =

Studio album by Masami Okui
- Released: (Japan) 1 May 2003 (limited), 11 May 2005 (re-release)
- Genre: J-pop
- Label: Star Child
- Producer: Masami Okui

Masami Okui chronology
Angel's Voice (2002)	Masami Kobushi (2003)	ReBirth (2004)

Masami Kobushi (マサミコブシ) is a cover album by Masami Okui.

== Information ==
- To commemorate her 10th anniversary since her debut in 1993, Masami Okui sang cover versions of 10 famous anime songs.
- It was first released on 1 May 2003 as a limited release and became very rare after a while. 2 years later, the album was re-released to public.

== Track listing ==
1. "Cutie Honey" (キューティーハニー)
  - Anime television series Cutie Honey opening theme
  - Lyrics: Cloud Q
  - Composition: Takeo Watanabe
  - Arrangement: Hideyuki Daichi Suzuki
2. "Give a Reason"
  - Anime television series Slayers Next opening theme
  - Lyrics: Satomi Arimori
  - Composition: Hidetoshi Sato
  - Arrangement: Tsutomu Ohira
3. "Truth"
  - Anime television series Revolutionary Girl Utena ending theme
  - Lyrics: Shoko Fujibayashi
  - Composition: Riki Arai
  - Arrangement: Hirama Akihiko
4. "Love Squall"
  - Anime television series Lupin III ending theme
  - Lyrics: Sanaho Maki
  - Composition: Yuji Ohno
  - Arrangement: Dry
5. "A Cruel Angel's Thesis" (残酷な天使のテーゼ)
  - Anime television series Neon Genesis Evangelion opening theme
  - Lyrics: Neko Oikawa
  - Composition: Hidetoshi Sato
  - Arrangement: Toshiyuki Omori
6. "Successful Mission"
  - Anime television series Saber Marionette J opening theme
  - Lyrics: MEGUMI
  - Composition: Hidetoshi Sato
  - Arrangement: Toshiro Yabuki
7. "Ghost Sweeper"
  - Anime television series Ghost Sweeper Mikami opening theme
  - Lyrics: Satomi Arimori
  - Composition: Toshiyuki Omori
  - Arrangement: Masaki Iwamoto
8. "Lupin III: Ai no Theme" (ルパン三世 愛のテーマ)
  - Anime television series Lupin III ending theme
  - Lyrics: Kazuya Senge
  - Composition: Yuji Ohno
  - Arrangement: Hideyuki Daichi Suzuki
9. "Soul's Refrain"
  - Movie anime Evangelion: Death and Rebirth theme song
  - Lyrics: Neko Oikawa
  - Composition, arrangement: Toshiyuki Omori
10. "Northern Lights"
  - Anime television series Shaman King opening theme
  - Lyrics: Megumi
  - Composition, arrangement: Gou Takahashi
11. "You Get to Burning"
  - Anime television series Martian Successor Nadesico opening theme
  - Lyrics: Satomi Arimori
  - Composition, arrangement: Toshiyuki Omori
12. "Kyō mo Dokoka de Devilman" (今日も何処かでデビルマン)
  - Anime television series Devilman ending theme
  - Lyrics: Yū Aku
  - Composition: Shunichi Tokura
  - Arrangement: Monta

== Sources ==
Official website: Makusonia
