= NEEI =

Studio album by Masami Okui
- Released: (Japan) 23 August 2000
- Genre: J-pop
- Length: 69:42
- Label: Star Child
- Producer: Toshiro Yabuki, Toshimichi Otsuki

Masami Okui chronology
Her-Day (1999)	NEEI (2000)	Li-Book 2000 (2000)

NEEI is the sixth album by Masami Okui, released on August 23, 2000.

== Track listing ==
1. Just Do It (NEEI mix)
  - Lyrics: Masami Okui
  - Composition, arrangement: Toshiro Yabuki
2. M.M Family
  - Lyrics: Masami Okui
  - Composition: Toshiro Yabuki
  - Arrangement: Masato Yamada, Toshiro Yabuki
3. Cutie
  - Anime television series Di Gi Charat Summer Special 2000 opening song
  - Lyrics: Masami Okui
  - Composition, arrangement: Toshiro Yabuki
4. Turning Point (L.A version)
  - Lyrics: Masami Okui
  - Composition, arrangement: Toshiro Yabuki
5. Sunrise Sunset
  - Lyrics, composition: Masami Okui
  - Arrangement: Itaru Watanabe
6. Over the End
  - Lyrics: Masami Okui
  - Composition, arrangement: Toshiro Yabuki
7. Monogatari (物語)
  - Lyrics: Masami Okui
  - Composition: Toshiro Yabuki
  - Arrangement: Hideki Satou
8. Chaos
  - Lyrics, composition: Masami Okui
  - Arrangement: Hideki Satou
9. Hoka ni Nani ga... (物語)
  - Lyrics: Masami Okui
  - Composition, arrangement: Tsutomu Ohira
10. Moon
  - Lyrics, composition: Masami Okui
  - Arrangement: Hideki Satou
11. Sore wa Totsuzen yattekuru (それは突然やってくる)
  - Lyrics: Masami Okui
  - Composition, arrangement: Toshiro Yabuki
12. Ajisai (紫陽花)
  - Lyrics, composition: Masami Okui
  - Arrangement: Tsutomu Ohira
13. eternal promise (version 091)
  - Lyrics: Masami Okui
  - Composition: Masami Okui, Toshiro Yabuki
  - Arrangement: Masami Okui
14. Only One, No. 1
  - Anime television series Di Gi Charat opening song
  - Lyrics: Masami Okui
  - Composition, arrangement: Toshiro Yabuki

== Sources ==
Official website: Makusonia
