= Angel's Voice =

Studio album by Masami Okui
- Released: (Japan) 22 November 2002
- Genre: J-pop
- Length: 34:01
- Label: King Records
- Producer: Masami Okui

Masami Okui chronology
Crossroad (2002)	Angel's Voice (2002)	Masami Kobushi (2003)

Angel's Voice is a mini album by Masami Okui, released on November 22, 2002.

== Track listing ==
1. Introduction ～Maria～ (introduction ～マリア～)
  - Lyrics, composition, arrangement: Masami Okui
2. White season
  - Lyrics, composition: Masami Okui
  - Arrangement: Hiroshi Uesugi
3. Sanctuary (サンクチュアリ)
  - Lyrics: Masami Okui
  - Composition, arrangement: Kenjiro Sakiya
4. Angel's Voice
  - Lyrics: Masami Okui
  - Composition: Kenji Hayashida
  - Arrangement: Hiroshi Uesugi
5. Tabibito (旅人, lit. Traveller)
  - Lyrics, composition: Masami Okui
  - Arrangement: Ryou Yoshimata
6. 2 years
  - Lyrics: Masami Okui
  - Composition, arrangement: Yamachi
7. 12 Tsuki no Kyuujitsu Kutsushita o Katta (12月の休日くつしたを買った)
  - Lyrics: Masami Okui
  - Composition: Monta
  - Arrangement: Hiroshi Uesugi

== Sources ==
Official website: Makusonia
