= Evolution (Masami Okui album) =

Studio album by Masami Okui
- Released: (Japan) 4 October 2006
- Genre: J-pop
- Length: 47:26
- Label: evolution

Masami Okui chronology
God Speed (2006)	Evolution (2006)	Masami Life (2007)

Evolution is the 12th album by Masami Okui, released on 4 October 2006. The album title came from Okui's independent record label company name Evolution.

== Track listing ==
1. "Soldier ~Love Battlefield~"
  - Lyrics: Masami Okui
  - Composition, arrangement: Hidetake Yamamoto
2. "zero -G-"
  - anime television Ray the Animation opening song
  - Lyrics: Masami Okui
  - Composition: Monta
  - Arrangement: Hideyuki Daichi Suzuki
3. "Iteza no Tsuki no Koromoni (射手座の月の衣に)"
  - Lyrics: Masami Okui
  - Composition: Kenjiro Sakiya
  - Arrangement: Atsushi Yamazaki
4. "Niji (虹)"
  - Lyrics: Masami Okui
  - Composition, arrangement: Kenjiro Sakiya
5. "Lunatic Summer"
  - Lyrics, composition: Masami Okui
  - Arrangement: Monta
6. "Kiba ~Tasuku~ (牙 ～タスク～)"
  - Lyrics: Masami Okui
  - Composition, arrangement: Macaroni
7. "Shiranui (不知火)"
  - Lyrics, composition: Masami Okui
  - Arrangement: Takahito Eguchi
8. "Wild Spice (Trance Mix)"
  - anime television Muteki Kanban Musume opening song
  - Lyrics: Masami Okui
  - Composition: Monta
  - Arrangement: Monta, 1DT
9. "Otomegokoro Mugen (乙女心無限)"
  - Lyrics, composition: Masami Okui
  - Arrangement: Hideyuki Daichi Suzuki
10. "Soul Mate"
  - Lyrics: Masami Okui
  - Composition, arrangement: Hidetake Yamamoto

== Sources ==
Official website: Makusonia
