= Masami Life =

Studio album by Masami Okui
- Released: (Japan) 3 October 2007
- Genre: J-pop
- Label: evolution
- Producer: Masami Okui

Masami Okui chronology
Evolution (2006)	Masami Life (2007)	Ooku (2008)

Masami Life is the 13th album by Masami Okui, released on 3 October 2007.

== Track listing ==
1. It's my life
  - Commercial song for Iromelo Mix
  - Lyrics: Masami Okui
  - Composition: Monta
  - Arrangement: Toshiro Yabuki, Tsutomu Ohira
2. Limited War
  - Lyrics: Masami Okui
  - Composition, arrangement: Monta
3. -w-
  - Lyrics: Masami Okui
  - Composition: Monta
  - Arrangement: Macaroni, Monta
4. -GAIA2012
  - Lyrics: Masami Okui
  - Composition, arrangement: Mikio Sakai
5. Ring
  - TV drama Jikuu Keisatsu Wecker Signa opening song
  - Lyrics: Masami Okui
  - Composition, arrangement: Monta
6. Remote Viewing
  - PS2 Game Routes PE and Routes Portable opening song
  - Lyrics: Masami Okui
  - Composition: Michio Kinugasa
  - Arrangement: Hideyuki Daichi Suzuki
7. Wasuregusa (ワスレグサ)
  - Lyrics, composition: Masami Okui
  - Arrangement: Hiroshi Uesugi
8. Haitoku no Kiss ~Love of A Fallen Angel~ (背徳のKISS-Love of a fallen angel)
  - Lyrics: Masami Okui
  - Composition, arrangement: Rala
9. Murasaki On -sion- (紫音 -sion-)
  - Lyrics, composition: Masami Okui
  - Arrangement: IPPEI
  - PC Game Muv-Luv Unlimited soundtrack
10. Mobile Magic
  - Lyrics: Masami Okui
  - Composition, arrangement: Macaroni
11. Wonderful Days
  - Lyrics: Masami Okui
  - Composition, arrangement: Toshiro Yabuki
12. I Wish
  - Lyrics: Masami Okui
  - Composition: Minami Kuribayashi
  - Arrangement: Tsutomu Ohira

== Sources ==
Official website: Makusonia
