= Dragonfly (Masami Okui album) =

Studio album by Masami Okui
- Released: 2 February 2005
- Genre: J-pop
- Length: 60:19
- Label: evolution
- Producer: Masami Okui

Masami Okui chronology
S-mode #2 (2004)	Dragonfly (2005)	S-mode #3 (2005)

Dragonfly is the tenth album by Masami Okui, released on 2 February 2005. This album is the first album she released under her own record label company Evolution.

== Track listing ==
1. Dragonfly
  - Lyrics: Masami Okui
  - Composition, arrangement: Monta
2. Fire.com
  - Lyrics: Masami Okui
  - Composition, arrangement: Macaroni
3. Stargate
  - Lyrics, composition: Masami Okui
  - Arrangement: Nils
4. A confession of Tokio
  - Commercial song for Iromelo Mix
  - Lyrics: Masami Okui
  - Composition: Hiroshi Uesugi
  - Arrangement: Hideyuki Daichi Suzuki
5. Route89
  - Lyrics: Masami Okui
  - Composition, arrangement: Monta
6. Wheel
  - Lyrics, composition: Masami Okui
  - Arrangement: Kenichi Sudo
7. Troubadour -Ginyuu Shijin- (Troubadour-吟遊詩人-)
  - Lyrics: Masami Okui
  - Composition, arrangement: Monta
8. Heaven's Door
  - Lyrics, composition: Masami Okui
  - Arrangement: Hideki Sato
9. Nostalgia
  - Lyrics:: Masami Okui, Toshiro Yabuki
  - Composition, arrangement: Toshiro Yabuki
10. Miracle Go! Go! (ミラクルGO!GO!)
  - Lyrics: Masami Okui
  - Composition, arrangement: Macaroni
11. To all the things to love
  - Lyrics, composition: Masami Okui
  - Arrangement: Hideyuki Daichi Suzuki
12. Olive
  - Commercial song for Iromelo Mix
  - Lyrics, composition: Masami Okui
  - Arrangement: Hideyuki Daichi Suzuki

== Sources ==
Discography on official website: Makusonia
