= Crossroad (Masami Okui album) =

Studio album by Masami Okui
- Released: (Japan) 4 September 2002
- Genre: J-pop
- Length: 61:50
- Label: King Records
- Producer: Masami Okui

Masami Okui chronology
Devotion (2001)	Crossroad (2002)	Angel's Voice (2002)

Crossroad is the eighth album by Masami Okui, released on September 4, 2002.

== Track listing ==
1. Scramble (スクランブル)
  - Lyrics, composition: Masami Okui
  - Arrangement: Monta
2. Love Locket ni Natte (ラブロケットniなって)
  - Lyrics, composition: Masami Okui
  - Arrangement: Monta
3. Kimi to Boku ni Dekiru Koto (君と僕にできること)
  - Lyrics, composition: Masami Okui
  - Arrangement: Yamachi
4. Happy Place
  - Lyrics, composition: Masami Okui
  - Arrangement: Dry
5. Strawberry Fields
  - Lyrics, composition: Masami Okui
  - Arrangement: Monta
6. Stillness
  - Lyrics: Jun Ootomo, Masami Okui
  - Composition: Jun Ootomo
  - Arrangement: Yamachi
7. Mission
  - Lyrics: Masami Okui
  - Composition, Arrangement: Monta
8. Necessary
  - Lyrics, composition: Masami Okui
  - Arrangement: Haya10
9. Be Free
  - Lyrics: Masami Okui
  - Composition: Monta
  - Arrangement: Hideyuki Daichi Suzuki
10. Bird
  - Lyrics: Masami Okui
  - Composition: Hiroto Yamada
  - Arrangement: Dry
11. High High High
  - Lyrics: Masami Okui
  - Composition, Arrangement: Monta
12. Iiwake (いいわけ)
  - Lyrics, composition: Masami Okui
  - Arrangement: Yamachi
13. Nemurenai Yoru ga Kureta Mono (眠れない夜がくれたもの)
  - Lyrics, composition: Masami Okui
  - Arrangement: Escargo, Monta

== Sources ==
Official website: Makusonia
