= Rebirth (Masami Okui album) =

ReBirth

Studio album by Masami Okui
- Released: (Japan) 4 February 2004
- Genre: J-pop
- Length: 53:51
- Label: King Records
- Producer: Masami Okui

Masami Okui chronology
Masami Kobushi (2003)	ReBirth (2004)	S-mode #2 (2004)

ReBirth is the ninth album by Masami Okui, released on 4 February 2004.

== Track listing ==
1. Introduction
  - Lyrics: Masami Okui
  - Composition: Ikuo
  - Arrangement: Hideyuki Daichi Suzuki
2. Poison
  - Lyrics: Masami Okui
  - Composition, arrangement: Macaroni
3. Second Impact
  - Lyrics, composition: Masami Okui
  - Arrangement: Toshiro Yabuki
4. I Lost
  - Lyrics, composition: Masami Okui
  - Arrangement: Hideyuki Daichi Suzuki
5. Innocence
  - Lyrics: Masami Okui
  - Composition, arrangement: Monta
6. Shinkai ~ReBirth~ (深海 ～ReBirth～)
  - Lyrics, composition: Masami Okui
  - Arrangement: Monta
7. Triangle+α
  - Lyrics: Masami Okui
  - Composition, arrangement: Macaroni
8. Message (LA version)
  - Lyrics: Monta, Masami Okui
  - Composition, arrangement: Monta
9. Boukensha (冒険者)
  - Lyrics, composition: Masami Okui
  - Arrangement: Yamachi
10. Houkago no Tenshi (放課後の天使)
  - Lyrics, composition: Masami Okui
  - Arrangement: Monta
11. Pandra ~Gendai Shinwa~ (PANDRA ～現代神話～)
  - Lyrics, composition: Masami Okui
  - Arrangement: Monta
12. Earth
  - Lyrics: Monta, Masami Okui
  - Composition, arrangement: Monta

== Sources ==
Official website: Makusonia
