= Devotion (Masami Okui album) =

DEVOTION

Studio album by Masami Okui
- Released: (Japan) 29 August 2001
- Genre: J-pop
- Length: 69:34
- Label: Star Child
- Producer: Masami Okui, Toshiro Yabuki, Toshimichi Otsuki

Masami Okui chronology
S-mode #1 (2001)	DEVOTION (2001)	Crossroad (2002)

Devotion is the seventh album by Masami Okui, released on August 29, 2001.

== Track listing ==
1. Sora ni Kakeru Hashi (空にかける橋)
  - anime television Tales of Eternia opening song
  - Lyrics, composition: Masami Okui
  - Arrangement: Toshiro Yabuki
2. Chou (蝶)
  - Lyrics: Masami Okui
  - Composition: Dry
  - Arrangement: Yuugo Maeda, Dry
3. Shōnen (少年)
  - Lyrics, composition: Masami Okui
  - Arrangement: Yuugo Maeda
4. Jounetsu (情熱)
  - Lyrics, composition: Masami Okui
  - Arrangement: Yuugo Maeda
5. DEPORTATION -but, never too late-
  - Lyrics, composition: Masami Okui
  - Arrangement: Topbeam
6. Shuffle
  - anime television Yu-Gi-Oh! Duel Monsters opening song
  - Lyrics: Masami Okui
  - Composition, arrangement: Toshiro Yabuki
7. Torein (トレイン)
  - Lyrics, composition: Masami Okui
  - Arrangement: Yuugo Maeda
8. Lotus
  - Lyrics, composition: Masami Okui
  - Arrangement: Yuugo Maeda
9. Ano hi no Gogo (あの日の午後)
  - anime television Yu-Gi-Oh! Duel Monsters ending song
  - Lyrics: Masami Okui
  - Composition, arrangement: Toshiro Yabuki
10. I'd love you to touch me
  - anime television Tales of Eternia ending song
  - Lyrics, composition: Masami Okui
  - Arrangement: System-B
11. Sayonara (さよなら)
  - Lyrics, composition: Masami Okui
  - Arrangement: Yuugo Maeda
12. Devotion
  - Lyrics, composition: Masami Okui
  - Arrangement: Yuugo Maeda
13. Megami ni naritai -for a yours- (女神になりたい -for a yours-)
  - anime television Di Gi Charat Christmas Special, Ohanami Special, Natsuyasumi Special opening song
  - Lyrics: Masami Okui
  - Composition, arrangement: Toshiro Yabuki

== Sources ==
Official website: Makusonia
