= Evil Zone =

1999 video game

- North American box art
- Developer: Yuke's Future Media Creators
- Publishers: JP: Yuke's Future Media Creators; NA/PAL: Titus Interactive
- Platform: PlayStation
- Release: JP: January 14, 1999; PAL: June 1999; NA: July 21, 1999
- Genre: Fighting
- Modes: Single-player, multiplayer

Evil Zone (Note: Known in Japan as Fūjin Ryōiki Eretzvaju (Japanese: 封神領域エルツヴァーユ, Hepburn: Fūjin Ryōiki Erutsuvāyu; Spirit Seal Area Eretzvaju)) is a 1999 fighting game developed by Yuke's Future Media Creators for the PlayStation. The player can choose from ten characters to fight in several game modes including story mode, arcade mode, versus mode, practice and survival mode.

== Story ==
The story of the game tells of Ihadurca, a powerful being who exists in multiple dimensions at once. The inhabitants of the world of I-Praseru (Happy Island) were able to temporarily confine Ihadurca in a dimension known as Evil Zone. A tournament is held to select the strongest warrior throughout the dimensions. The champion will be tasked to destroy Ihadurca before she can escape the Evil Zone and threaten the world once more.

The story mode is presented as an anime. Every playable character has their own unique story, each including their unique title movie and cutscenes narrated by the playable character. The cutscenes are animated in an anime style and drawn by the animation studio AIC.

== Gameplay ==
During the game, fighting occurs on a 3D field, with characters allowed to move forwards, backward, and sidestep left and right. Most of the fighting is done with range-based attacks, but it is possible to attack a short-range and use grapple moves on your opponent. The fighting system only utilizes two main moves types: attack and guard.

Each playable character has a unique move set and ultra-attack. An ultra-attack is a powerful move that requires 'Power Stocks' to perform. 'Power Stocks' are obtained by the character standing still and charging; characters can hold up to three stocks at a time. The less health a character has, the faster it takes to charge.

A 'Pressure Dash' can occur if both characters perform a dash attack, towards each other, at the same time. If a 'Pressure Dash' occurs, each player must rapidly hit buttons; the winner gains an advantage over their opponent.

== Characters ==
There are 10 playable characters in Evil Zone, including the story's antagonist, Ihadurca:^{b}

- Setsuna Saizuki - "The Guardian Angel"
- Linedwell Rainrix - "A Medium at Daybreak"
- Erel Plowse - "Mercenary"
- Gally 'Vanish' Gregman - "The Bounty Hunter"
- Keiya Tenpouin - "The Man in the Shadow"
- Midori Himeno - "Grappler and Passionate"
- Danzaiver - "Exceptional Inspector"
- Alty Al Lazel - "Wizard"
- Kakurine - "Priestess"
- Ihadurca - "The Absolute Existence"

== Reception ==
Reception

Aggregate score
Aggregator	Score
GameRankings	62%

Review scores
Publication	Score
AllGame	2/5
Computer and Video Games	2/5
Electronic Gaming Monthly	5.25/10
Famitsu	27/40
Game Informer	5/10
GameFan	63%
GameSpot	7.6/10
IGN	4/10
PlayStation Official Magazine – UK	6/10
Official U.S. PlayStation Magazine	3/5

The game received mixed reviews according to the review aggregation website GameRankings. In Japan, Famitsu gave it a score of 27 out of 40.

== Notes ==
_{b.Written as character - "Alias"}
