= He Is My Master =

Japanese manga series by Mattsuu

- He is My Master
- Cover of the first manga volume

これが私の御主人様 (Kore ga Watashi no Goshujin-sama)
- Genre: Comedy, harem
- Manga
- Written by: Mattsuu
- Illustrated by: Asu Tsubaki
- Published by: Square Enix
- English publisher: NA: Seven Seas Entertainment
- Magazine: Monthly Shōnen Gangan
- Original run: 8 February 2002 – February 2007
- Volumes: 5
- Anime television series
- Directed by: Shouji Saeki
- Produced by: Kouichi Kogako (Q-tec); Tetsuo Genshou (TBS); Yuuichi Sekido (Pioneer LDC); Hiroki Satou (Gainax)
- Written by: Shouji Saeki
- Music by: Seikō Nagaoka
- Studio: Gainax; Shaft
- Licensed by: NA: Sentai Filmworks
- Original network: BSi (Satellite station of TBS)
- Original run: 8 April 2005 – 1 July 2005
- Episodes: 12
- icon

He Is My Master (これが私の御主人様, Kore ga Watashi no Goshujin-sama) is a Japanese manga series written by Mattsuu and illustrated by Asu Tsubaki, a formerly married couple. It originally ran in Monthly Shōnen Gangan from February 2002 to February 2007. It was adapted into an anime television series by Gainax and Shaft in 2005.

Seven Seas Entertainment announced on November 27, 2006, they now have licensed the right to the English translation of He Is My Master and has begun to release the series July 2007.

Sentai Filmworks has licensed the anime and released the complete collection on October 10, 2009; with distribution handled by Section23 Films.

== Synopsis ==
A 14-year-old millionaire Yoshitaka received an enormous inheritance as a result of his parents' death in an accident. Later after firing the original maids, he needed to be looked after so he decided to hire new live-in maids. While originally expecting an elderly woman to take the job, two runaway girls, Izumi, 14, and Mitsuki, 13, end up accepting the job as means for a home and income. Another girl, Anna, later becomes a maid as well, and all three live in the mansion with Yoshitaka. The boy pulls some clichéd pranks throughout the story.

== Characters ==
=== Main characters ===
An early panel in the English version of the He Is My Master manga. Asu Tsubaki's art style is markedly different from that used in the anime adaptation.

Izumi Sawatari (沢渡いずみ, Sawatari Izumi)
Voiced by: Masumi Asano
Izumi is one of the three girls who is hired by Yoshitaka. While reluctant about working there she has to work for Yoshitaka as she has a huge debt to pay off. Because Yoshitaka is the way he is, Izumi repeatedly stamps on him and hands out pay to him. She is impossibly strong (shown in various episodes) and has rather large breasts for a 14 year old.
Izumi never uses an honorific suffix (-san, -sama, -kun etc.) after Yoshitaka's name. While this usually means the speaker is very close to the person, this could also mean a grave insult. Izumi uses it to show her contempt and complete lack of respect for him. As a result, Yoshitaka often places the more difficult (and often pointless) tasks on Izumi. Izumi was originally going to be the "normal" character of the series but she turned out to show violent tendencies towards Yoshitaka and became the "doll" of the household: Everyone, including Mitsuki, messes with her in some sort of sexual tendency much to Izumi's dread and irritation. Be it flipping her skirt or attempting to remove her bra, Izumi is constantly being harassed.
Out of all characters, Izumi, is the one who drives the plot the most, being the subject of nearly every episode. She was even addressed by the sixth episode's title, saying that 'He is my master' is "The story about Izumi Sawatari".
In episode 9, during Izumi's tropical photoshoot, Yoshitaka appears and mentions that "the ones who want [her] photobook are the extreme maniacs anyway." Izumi is 14 years old, the same age as Yoshitaka. While frowned upon in the West, in Japan, girls under 15 years of age (sometimes as young as 11 or 12) who pose for photobooks are quite popular. Referred to as a gravure idol, or a Japanese idol and model who poses for photographs and videos, more well-known idols include Mao Kobayashi (born in 1992) and Saaya Irie (born in 1993).
Yoshitaka Nakabayashi (中林義貴, Nakabayashi Yoshitaka)
Voiced by: Junko Minagawa
Yoshitaka is the 14-year-old boy who inherits his parents' fortune. He is described by others (and an episode title) as "the boy in the midst of puberty who inherited his parents' fortune and was living all by himself with no supervision and has surrounded himself with tender young girls in a huge mansion, thus living out his fantasies and creating his own world of desire as he makes them serve him". He installed scores of hidden video cameras throughout his mansion, and can efficiently record or snapshot instances and events he finds pleasing. His media archive is routinely browsed by Mitsuki each night from the comfort of the sisters' bedroom computer. Yoshitaka is never addressed by his family name except by some of his classmates; he is addressed either as "Yoshitaka" (with and without honorifics) or as "master" throughout the story. Yoshitaka is hated by nearly everyone in the story, as a boy who flaunts his money. Izumi hates him and often refers to him as an "inhumane pervert with a lolicon fetish" but, deep down they both seem to have feelings for each other shown in episodes 10-12 where it is clearly stated he loves her. He even has a closet full of extra (suggestive) clothes for the girls (i.e.: sailor suits and bunny costumes), Yoshitaka made them all by himself, as he is said to be a natural genius, when it comes to sewing outfits, such as a making a wedding dress for Izumi, however Izumi states he would waste his unique talent on his fetishes. He would never waste a single millimeter, making an outfit's skirt longer than it needs to cover the most important parts.
Mitsuki Sawatari (沢渡みつき, Sawatari Mitsuki)
Voiced by: Ai Shimizu
Mitsuki is Izumi's younger sister, by one year, and is hired by Yoshitaka along with Izumi. By using photographs from Yoshitaka's media archive, she signs Izumi up for a "Net Idol" website, which later, with revenue from Izumi's performances, helps Izumi pay off her debt. Mitsuki herself actually becomes very rich because of Izumi's popularity. Mitsuki always (when under Yoshitaka's contract) refers to Yoshitaka as Goshujin-sama or "Master". She even has her own fan club from her own school and other schools as well. She frequently comes up with (weird) competitions whenever two characters have divided opinions, most of the competitions ends up with Pochi playing some kind of key role that results in a bizarre conclusion, she seems to favor Yoshitaka during these competitions and usually requires Izumi (albeit unwillingly) to compete. She loves the maid uniforms while as Izumi thinks they are way too revealing. Mitsuki even sang a song at a festival titled "I'm a cute maid at a pervert's house!" Although usually portrayed as a cute character, she has interests one would not normally suspect of a cute character, such as heavy metal music. At one point in the manga, it is even suggested that Mitsuki has torture equipment. Mitsuki is a smart character, planning everything to the smallest detail. Her biggest plan in the anime adaptation, even went one month into the future, and finally made sure that Izumi, beside having paid off the debt ends up accepting to live in Yoshitaka's mansion and being happy.
Anna Kurauchi (倉内安奈, Kurauchi Anna)
Voiced by: Kana Ueda
Anna is the third girl hired by Yoshitaka. She's bisexual and constantly tries to do perverted acts with Izumi, who is mostly disgusted by her lesbianism. She was originally attracted to Yoshitaka, but because of Izumi's relentless effort convincing her to stay away from Yoshitaka, she mistook it as sign of interest, thus she fell in love with Izumi and became Yoshitaka's maid in order to follow Izumi. She even dreams of traveling to the Netherlands to arrange a same-sex marriage, going far as to study the language. She is discouraged later in the episode, finding out that being under 16, they cannot be married (yet). Her inability to cook is the subject of many jokes in the story. She was originally going to be the "innocent" member of the group, but her personality reverted to that of Yoshitaka's.
Pochi (ポチ)
Voiced by: Kyousei Tsukui
Pochi is an alligator which belongs to Mitsuki and the reason Izumi and Mitsuki ran away from home. Originally, Pochi's parents lived at Mitsuki and Izumi's home. However, one of the alligators attacked Mitsuki, causing Mitsuki's father to have the alligators taken away and put down. Mitsuki finds an egg belonging to Pochi's parents, and discovers that she was partly responsible for what happened to Pochi's parents. Pochi is one of the reasons why Izumi and Mitsuki stay at Yoshitaka's mansion because Mitsuki will not go anywhere without a spot for Pochi. Pochi likes cute girls and often tries to rape Izumi in the anime. (In the manga, he is actually more respectful of her, though still perverted.) He strongly dislikes males.
Note: Pochi is often used to name reptiles as if they were domesticated pets such as pet dogs, similar to the name Spot in western society. Similarly, Pochi is the name of the pet dragon in Keio Flying Squadron.

=== Minor characters ===
Father Sawatari (沢渡父, Sawatari Chichi)
Voiced by: Dai Matsumoto
Mr. Sawatari is Izumi, Mitsuki, and Karin's father. His given name is unknown. Upon hearing the rumors of Yoshitaka, he immediately approached the mansion to demand the return of Izumi and Mitsuki. All his attempts at retrieving Izumi and Mitsuki fail, usually when his wife, Mizuho, abruptly stops him. Like Yoshitaka, Mr. Sawatari is a lolicon pervert, although he wishes to "not be put in the same category." Mr. Sawatari is highly attracted to his two daughters in a perverted way (seemingly stronger when the girls dress up). Izumi has even once said "I've seen how you look at us!" referring to herself and Mitsuki. This is played up more in the anime, where it is revealed that the reason the girls ran away from home in the first place was because they grew tired of resisting his constant sexual advances towards them, with him always declaring "I love both you just as much as your mother! Just as much!" as he regularly tried to seduce them.
Mizuho Sawatari (沢渡瑞穂, Sawatari Mizuho)
Voiced by: Sayaka Ohara
Mizuho is the mother of Izumi, Mitsuki, and Karin. Compared to her husband, Mizuho is very young, having Izumi at the age of 16 and being age 30 during the story. Also in contrast to her husband, she is not concerned at all with two of her daughters in the hands of a perverted teenager, and will allow a love relationship between Izumi and either Anna (stating that "love has nothing to do with gender") or Yoshitaka (stating that he should "feel free to go crazy"). She and Mitsuki are very similar, as Mitsuki has learned almost everything from her mother.
Karin Sawatari (沢渡かりん, Sawatari Karin)
Voiced by: Rumi Shishido
Karin is the younger sister of Izumi and Mitsuki. Unlike her two sisters, she stayed behind rather than run away. After learning of her sisters' whereabouts, she visits them occasionally, although Izumi discourages her in order to keep her away from Yoshitaka's grasp after Yoshitaka becomes attracted to her when Karin is in the child's maid costume. Karin is a typical 5 year old; sweet and innocent. She is oblivious to Yoshitaka's perverted nature as well as the harassment that Izumi receives on a daily basis. Like Mitsuki, she loves alligators, especially Pochi. She believes that "anyone who likes alligators can't be bad." Yoshitaka tricks her into thinking he likes Pochi (when in fact they are often rivals) to make Karin like him.
Shinji Kume (久米伸治, Kume Shinji)
Voiced by: Kōichi Tōchika
Kume Shinji, along with other upperclassmen, formed a bodyguard squad after being impressed with Mitsuki's appearance, and aid Mitsuki with difficult tasks on various episodes. He is addressed by his friends as "Kume Shin".
Alicia (アリシア)
Voiced by: Natsuko Kuwatani
Alicia appears in one episode, and is a sadistic French blonde. She whips Yoshitaka effortlessly with her beautiful, crimson whip.
Seiichirou Nakabayashi (中林誠一郎, Nakabayashi Seiichirō)
Voiced by: Romi Park
Seichirou is Yoshitaka's cousin. Seichirou was raised in a similar lifestyle as Yoshitaka, but was plummeted into poverty upon the death of Yoshitaka's parents. Upon finding Mitsuki's website, Seichirou made a financial comeback by forming a production company. Through a series of contests, he was able to take possession of Izumi momentarily. In terms of personality, Seiichirou is also a lolicon uniform fetishist who loves peeping pictures and playing girl simulation games like Yoshitaka, but also is a crossdresser.
Takami Sugita (杉田多可美, Sugita Takami)
Voiced by: Ayako Kawasumi
Takami is the only daughter of the Sugita family, a family that has rivaled the Nakabayashi family for generations. As Yoshitaka hit bankruptcy, Takami seized the opportunity to claim the Nakabayashi estate. Her disposition is nothing short of arrogant and haughty. She also has an interest in Mitsuki's production ability, since Takami was runner-up in the Net Idol competition.
Mattsū (まっつー) and Asu Tsubaki (椿あす, Tsubaki Asu)
Mattsū and Asu Tsubaki are the authors of the He Is My Master manga. Within the story, Mattsū and Asu are represented as an alligator and hamster, respectively. An image of them on a cloud in heaven appears each time Izumi (and once Yoshitaka) mentions kami-sama (神様); "the gods watching over me". This happens once per episode.

== Anime ==
The anime was directed by Shouji Saeki at Gainax and Shaft, and Saeki also served as the series composition writer. Seikou Nagaoka composed the music, and Gainax's Kazuhiro Takamura served as the character designer and chief animation director. Four episodes were outsourced outside of Gainax and Shaft: episodes 3 and 8 to Studio Pastoral; and episodes 6 and 11 to Studio Tama. (Note: Outsourcing studios credited as Production Assistance (制作協力) on their respective episodes.)

=== Episodes ===
No.	Title	Directed by (Note: Information is taken from the ending credits of each episode.)	Written by	Storyboarded by	Original release date
1	"He Is My Master!?"; Transliteration: "Kore ga Watashi no Goshujin-sama!?" (Japanese: これが私のご主人様!?)	Shouji Saeki	Shouji Saeki	Shouji Saeki	April 8, 2005
Izumi and Mitsuki have run away from the cafe and are looking for work. They notice a sign indicating jobs as maids, but Izumi takes an understandable disliking to Yoshitaka and the girls leave - but they don't get far.
2	"That Vase, it's 5,000,000..."; Transliteration: "Sono Tsubo, 500-man'en..." (Japanese: あの壷、500万...)	Masahiko Ootsuka	Shouji Saeki	Masahiko Ootsuka	April 15, 2005
Yoshitaka convinces the girls to come back inside, then hands them the bill for all the things Pochi and Izumi broke the previous day. Between needing to pay off their debt and needing a place to stay, the girls end up employed by Yoshitaka.
3	"The Lolicon Uniform Fetishist Who Loves Peeping Pictures and Plays Girl Simulation Games"; Transliteration: "Lolicon de Seifuku Mania de Kakushidori Mania no Galge Mania" (Japanese: ロリコンで制服マニアで隠し撮りマニアのギャルげーマニア)	Tadao Ookubo	Jukki Hanada	Hidetoshi Oomori	April 22, 2005
Izumi and Mitsuki enter Yoshitaka's school, where they meet Anna.
4	"Couples Formed Under Extraordinary Circumstances Don't Last Long, You Know"; Transliteration: "Ijou na Joukyouka de Musubareta Danjo wa Nagatsuzuki Sen Jarou" (Japanese: 異常な状況下で結ばれた男女は長ろう続きせんじゃ)	Hiroaki Nishimura	Natsue Yoguchi	Hiroyuki Imaishi	May 6, 2005
Mitsuki's fan club kidnaps her, taking over the mansion. Izumi and Yoshitaka (as well as Anna and Pochi) must work together to save her.
5	"There`s a Rumor About an Adolescent Boy (Note: Full title: There's a rumor about an adolescent boy who inherited his parents' fortune and is living all by himself with no supervision has surrounded himself with tender young girls in a huge mansion, thus living out his fantasies and creating his own world of desire as he makes them serve him)" Transliteration: "Oya no Isan wo Uketsuide Hitorigurashi (Note: Full title: Oya no Isan o Uketsuide Hitorigurashi wo Shite Iru Shishunki Mattadanaka no Shounen ga Seken no Me ga Todokanai no o Ii Koto ni Koudai na Yashiki ni Itaike na Shoujo o Kakotte Yokubou no Omomuku mama ni Jibun no Shumi no Sekai o Tsukutte Houshi Sasete Iru to Iu Uwasa)" (Japanese: 親の遺産を受け継いで一人暮ら (Note: Full title: 親の遺産を受け継いで一人暮らしをしている思春期真っ只中の少年が世界の目が届かないのをいいことに広大な屋敷にいたいけな少女を囲って欲望の赴くままに自分の趣味の世界を作って奉仕させているという噂))	Hiroto Katou	Takashi Aoshima	Hiroto Katou	May 13, 2005
Izumi and Mitsuki's parents pay a visit, to get the girls back. A contest is made to see who gets Izumi!
6	"The Sawatari Izumi Contest Series!! (Note: Full title: The Sawatari Izumi Contest Series!! A Daring Test of Courage!! An Express Train to a Secret Hotsprings in the Northeast, a Mother-in-law Murdered in the Mist, a Madonna Teacher from an Elite Family Burning with Desire as They Watch a Housewife Battle for Control of Her Troubled Mansion!!)"; Transliteration: "Sawatari Izumi Soudatsuden Shirizu!! (Note: Full title: Sawatari Izumi Soudatsuden Shirizu!! Zekkyou Kimodameshi! Hitou Tokkyuu Touhoku Yukemuri Shuutome Satsujin Yokubou ni Moeru Elite Katei Madonna Kyoushi no Midareta Mansion Keiei no Atome Arasoi Kaseifu wa Mita!)" (Japanese: 沢渡いずみ争奪戦シリーズ!! (Note: Full title: 沢渡いずみ争奪戦シリーズ!! 絶叫肝だめし!! 秘湯特急東北湯煙姑殺人欲望に燃えるエリート家庭マドンナ教師の乱れたマンション経営の跡目争い家政婦は見た!!))	Hiroaki Nishimura	Jukki Hanada	Kazuki Tsunoda	May 20, 2005
Yoshitaka takes the maids to the Summer Festival, but Mitsuki disappears, and it seems the ghost of Yoshitaka's father is involved they asked if they did something together did they do it?
7	"He Is Izumi's"; Transliteration: "Kore ga Izumi no XXX!?" (Japanese: ♡?♡!? これがいずみの♡♡♡!?)	Toshimasa Suzuki	Shouji Saeki	Michio Fukuda	May 27, 2005
After a series of weird events, Izumi gets the chance of a lifetime to become an idol, will she take the opportunity?
8	"An Unbelievably Short Strike Zone"; Transliteration: "Hateshinaku Hikui Strike Zone" (Japanese: 果てしなく低いストライクゾーン)	Tadao Ookubo	Takashi Aoshima	Hidetoshi Oomori	June 3, 2005
Karin visits Izumi and convinces her to become an idol.
9	"Although Izumi is Izumi, Izumi Won't Yield to Anyone"; Transliteration: "Izumi wa Izumi demo Mou Nanimono ni mo Kusshinai Izumi" (Japanese: いずみはいずみでももう何者にも屈しないいずみ)	Katsuichi Nakayama	Natsue Yoguchi	Katsuichi Nakayama	June 10, 2005
The gang go to the beach for Izumi's photoshoot where they meet Alicia and Ellen
10	"He Is My Prince!?"; Transliteration: "Kore ga Watashi no Ouji-sama!?" (Japanese: これが私の王子様!?)	Hiroto Katou	Shouji Saeki	Osamu Tadokoro	June 17, 2005
Seichirou and Yoshitaka compete to have Izumi and Mitsuki as their maids but there seems to be something suspicious about Seichirou.
11	"The Far-Away Boy Yoshitaka"; Transliteration: "Harukanaru Kano Yoshitaka" (Japanese: 遥かなる彼の義貴)	Hiroaki Nishimura	Shouji Saeki	Shouji Saeki; Masami Furukawa	June 24, 2005
Takami challenges Izumi to a contest.
12	"He Is My Master!!"; Transliteration: "Kore ga Watashi no Goshujin-sama!!" (Japanese: これが私の御主人様!!)	Shouji Saeki	Shouji Saeki	Shouji Saeki	July 1, 2005
The final showdown between Takami and Izumi!

=== Recurring gags ===
In every episode God is mentioned and it shows avatars of the show's creators doing actions. Occasionally the avatars do something relevant to the plot (such as draw a picture of clothing and stick a fountain pen in Yoshitakas head to make him think he drew it).

At the end of each episode, with the exception of episode 9 and 10, 4 recurring gags are shown; the first gag shows an exhausted Izumi either in bed or bathing. The second gag shows Mitsuki working on her photobook of Izumi's revealing pictures taken from hidden cameras earlier on in the episode. The third gag shows a frustrated Yoshitaka in a small, messy room working on draft designs for new outfits for his maids. The fourth gag shows an aerial shot of the mansion with Yoshitaka ranting or manically laughing, and two numbers show up. The first number is the amount of damages Izumi must pay off for that particular day, and the second number is the amount of money she has left to pay, listed in yen. And, in some of the episodes it shows Mitsuki's earnings for that day.

=== Anime soundtrack ===
Opening theme song
Masami Okui - TRUST
Ending theme song
Izumi, Mitsuki, and Anna - 愛情のカタマリ (Aijō no Katamari)

== Reception ==
The anime series received mixed to negative reviews.

On Anime News Network (ANN), Theron Martin reviewed the series, giving it an overall cautiously positive rating, saying it is "definitely better than it could have been," pointing to the evil personality of the male lead, Yoshitaka as "very refreshing" after other series had "indecisive and weak male leads" while praising the "plentiful fanservice" and comedy. He criticized the series for stereotypical elements and cliches.
