= Jungle de Ikou! =

Original video animation

- Jungle de Ikou
- Promotional poster showing main characters Natsumi Rokudo and Rongo.

ジャングルDEいこう! (Janguru de Ikō!)
- Genre: Comedy, Magical Girl
- Created by: Yuji Moriyama
- Original video animation
- Directed by: Yuji Moriyama
- Written by: Yōsuke Kuroda
- Music by: Parome
- Studio: Chaos Project
- Licensed by: US: AnimeWorks
- Released: March 26, 1997 – September 26, 1997
- Runtime: 30 minutes
- Episodes: 3

Jungle de Ikou! (ジャングルDEいこう!, Janguru de Ikō!; lit. Let's go to the jungle!) is a Japanese OVA series written by Yōsuke Kuroda and directed by Yuji Moriyama in 1997. It has been licensed in the U.S. by Media Blasters and was released on VHS in 1999, on DVD in 2001, and on Blu-ray in 2020. It was also added on Tubi.

== Synopsis ==
The story is centered on Natsumi, a young student from Japan who gains the powers of Mii, the well-endowed fertility goddess of a tribal culture. Natsumi and her friends must save the Earth from ultimate destruction by a "god of ruin".

== Characters ==
Natsumi Rokudo (六道那柘美, Rokydō Natsumi)
Voiced by: Eri Sendai (Japanese); Melissa Fahn (English)
Natsumi is a ten-year-old schoolgirl who is given an ancient sculpture by her father. In a dream, the God of Earth, Ahem, appears before her and teaches her a special dance that allows her to transform into Mii (ミィ), a spirit of flowers, fertility, and reproduction. Her large breasts represent and contain Earth's life-giving energy. Mii can also enlarge her whole body to giant size when needed, which causes her breasts to grow larger proportionally.
Ongo (オンゴ)
Voiced by: Megumi Hayashibara (Japanese); Mona Marshall (English, good Ongo); Lex Lang (English, bad Ongo)
Ongo is the spirit of wood and destruction. Thousands of years ago, he was engaged to the water spirit Rongo, but then the evil inside of him awakened. He went on a vicious rampage of destruction in the heart of New Guinea, only to be stopped by the flower spirit Mii, who sacrificed herself to imprison him. In 2009 Fuyuhiko Rokudo, an archaeologist unknowingly brought his statuette prison back to Japan as a gift for his daughter, Natsumi.
Upon his release, Ongo was revealed to be a little pygmy and he began to cause all sorts of mischief. Later he became the destroyer again, but Mii defeated him by comforting him with her breasts.
Ongo's powers include being able to summon anything through wood, and as the destroyer he can fire bolts of energy out of his mouth as well as his hands, and extend his claws into long blades.
Rongo (ロンゴ)
Voiced by: Sumi Shimamoto (Japanese); Dina Sherman (English, little Rongo); Barbara Goodson (English, normal Rongo)
Rongo is Ahem's daughter, the water spirit. Centuries ago, she was engaged to Ongo until he became evil and they were split up. In 2009, Rongo spotted Ongo in Tokyo with Mii. Believing Mii had taken the form of a 10-year-old and taken Ongo for herself, Rongo took over the body of Natsumi's friend Nami, and tried to remove her skull necklace, only to receive an electric shock.
Then upon doing a dance, Rongo showed herself and attacked Natsumi with water, and when Ongo showed up, Rongo was horrified that he did not remember her. So Rongo challenged Natsumi to a duel and, after almost shooting a fighter jet down with jets of water, Natsumi tried to stop Rongo, but due to interference by Ongo, Rongo was transformed into a smaller child version of herself. Only then did Ongo remember her. Having lost her powers, Rongo requested to stay with Natsumi.
When Ongo became evil and giant again, Rongo tried to stop him, but eventually she left it up to Mii. Rongo's powers include being able to control all forms of water.
Nami Kuki (九鬼波美, Kuki Nami)
Voiced by: Sumie Baba (Japanese); Michelle Ruff (English)
Nami Kuki is Natsumi's newest friend. She is a shy soft-spoken and strange girl, Nami is into things like magic and UFOs. Her dream is to obtain New Guinean magic and take over the world. When Natsumi takes Nami to the museum to look at the artifacts her dad brought back, Nami gets possessed by Rongo - who thinks Natsumi has stolen Ongo from her. Rongo soon was defeated though and gives Nami back, but the two can still bond together when Nami does her own dance of transformation.
Ahem (アハム, Ahamu)
Voiced by: Kaneta Kimotsuki (Japanese); Steve Kramer (English)
Ahem is the spirit of earth and according to rumor, Mii's ex-husband. When Natsumi inadvertently breaks the seal of Ongo's prison, Ahem appears to her in a dream and gives her Mii's necklace. He then demonstrates a perverted dance which he says will protect Natsumi in times of danger. This dance in fact unleashes the spirit of Mii, and gives Natsumi all of her powers. When Ongo became evil again, Ahem destroyed the evil spirit inside him.
Ahem's powers seem to be the ability to destroy evil with his spear, and to enlarge the spear into a pole.
Takuma Kusanagi (草薙琢磨, Kusanagi Takuma)
Voiced by: Kappei Yamaguchi (Japanese); Barbara Goodson (English)
Takuma Kusanagi is one of Natsumi's friends. Although she hangs out with him a lot, she is disgusted with his perverted attitude. This gets worse when Mii shows up and he becomes infatuated with her. He also has frequent conflicts with his father.
Fuyuhiko Rokudo (六道富由彦, Rokudō Fuyuhiko)
Voiced by: Ryunosuke Ohbayashi (Japanese); Doug Stone (English)
Fuyuhiko Rokudo is Natsumi's dad who's an archaeologist. He brought back the statuette from New Guinea with the two gems that had Ongo trapped in them. Natsumi is upset that he still treats her like a little girl, instead of a young woman.
Haruka Rokudo (六道葉琉香, Rokudō Haruka)
Voiced by: Mako Hyoudou (Japanese); Dolly Pearl (English)
Haruka Rokudo is Natsumi's mother who's a very devoted housewife.
Manami Izumikawa (泉川真奈見, Izumikawa Manami)
Voiced by: Akiko Yajima (Japanese); Jessica Gee-George (English)
Manami Izumikawa is the grade's class president and a classmate of Natsumi and Takuma. She has been freaked out by all the weird occurrences that have been going on.
Itsuki Kusanagi (草薙五木, Kusanagi Itsuki)
Voiced by: Toshihiko Nakajima (Japanese); Lex Lang (English)
Itsuki Kusanagi is Takuma's dad. He owns an antique shop. Itsuki wishes his son would treat him with more respect, and the two of them fight constantly over petty things.

== Media ==
Jungle de Ikou! is primarily a three-part OVA series, but the franchise extended to three drama CDs, a soundtrack CD and a novel, with only the OVA being released as an English-language version on home video.

- Drama CD 1

Story 1 - Natsumi stops a robbery as Mii on her way to school. Then at school, there is a celebration going on. During it, Natsumi loses track of Ongo. Ongo meets up with Rongo in the school kitchen where Ongo accidentally turns all of the beef patties back into live cows! They stampede throughout the halls, but Natsumi becomes Mii and saves the day.
Story 2 - After walking in on her mother and father as they make love, Natsumi goes on an odyssey throughout the city.

- Drama CD 2

Story 1 - Natsumi and Takuma notice Nami acting stranger than usual, so they follow her. But suddenly, a monster attacks, cutting off their surveillance and knocking Takuma into the stratosphere! Natsumi becomes Mii and tries to stop it but is defeated, after some mental coaching from Ahem, Mii, Ongo, and Rongo defeat the monster. But then, a flying saucer lands, and an alien emerges carrying Takuma! After Natsumi's foreigner friend Robert speaks to the alien, which happens to be an old friend of his, the alien lets Takuma go.
Story 2 - Natsumi arrives home only to find that Ahem is visiting! Ahem tells Natsumi a story about an apocalyptic future in which Natsumi, Ongo, and Ahem band together to destroy a dangerous monster.

- Drama CD 3

Story 1 - Natsumi, her parents, Nami, and Takuma visit a hot spring in the Izu Peninsula whose administrator, named Sandora, is possessed by an evil force and Natsumi must stop her.
Story 2 - Natsumi as Mii must rescue Ongo and Rongo when they sneak aboard a space shuttle.

- Soundtrack

Story 1 - Natsumi and Takuma are approached by a girl who claims to be Takumi, their daughter from the future! It turns out to be Nami in disguise.
Story 2 - Natsumi's foreign friend Robert can't pay for the food he's eaten at a restaurant, so he is kicked out until he can.
Story 3 - Rongo tries to find a present for Ongo to deter his affections away from Natsumi.
Story 4 - Nami holds a conference, claiming she has uncovered the true identity of Mii. Natsumi panics, and becomes Mii to stop her from revealing her secret, but Nami reveals it anyway. Mii then has Robert distract the audience while she uses her power to erase everyone's memory.

== Reception ==
- Beveridge, Chris (July 31, 2001). "Jungle de Ikou". Mania. Demand Media. Archived from the original on April 8, 2009.
- Divers, Allen (January 6, 2002). "Jungle De Ikou (OAV) DVD". Anime News Network.
- Beard, Jeremy A. (October 29, 2003). "Jungle de Ikou". T.H.E.M. Anime Reviews.
