= Tekkaman Blade =

Japanese anime television series

- Cover of the North American DVD release of "Collection One" featuring the main cast
- Also known as: Space Knight Tekkaman Blade
- 宇宙の騎士テッカマンブレード
- Genre: Adventure, Mecha, science fiction, superhero, science fantasy
- Created by: Tatsunoko Production Planning Office
- Developed by: Mayori Sekijima; Satoru Akahori
- Directed by: Hiroshi Negishi
- Music by: Kaoru Wada
- Country of origin: Japan
- Original language: Japanese
- No. of episodes: 49

Production
- Executive producer: Ippei Kuri
- Producers: Mutsuo Shimizu (TV Tokyo); Hidenori Itahashi (Sotsu Agency); Motonoki Ueda (Tatsunoko)
- Production companies: TV Tokyo; Sotsu Agency; Tatsunoko Production

Original release
- Network: TXN (TV Tokyo)
- Release: February 18, 1992 – February 2, 1993

Related
- Original video animation
- Directed by: Hideki Tonokatsu
- Written by: Akihiko Ureshino (Twin Blood); Hideki Tonokatsu (Burning Clock, Missing Link)
- Music by: Kaoru Wada
- Studio: Tatsunoko Productions
- Released: 1998
- Episodes: 3
- Video game

Uchū no Kishi: Tekkaman Blade
- Developer: BEC
- Publisher: Bandai; Yutaka (Game Boy)
- Genre: Scrolling shooter/fighting (SNES); Platform (Game Boy)
- Platform: Game Boy, Super Famicom, NEC PC-9801
- Released: July 30, 1993
- Original video animation

Tekkaman Blade II
- Directed by: Hideki Tonokatsu
- Produced by: Kyouko Okazaki; Shuuji Uchiyama
- Written by: Hiroyuki Kawasaki
- Music by: Takashi Kudoh
- Studio: Tatsunoko Production
- Licensed by: NA: Urban Vision (former) Discotek Media
- Released: July 21, 1994 – April 21, 1995
- Runtime: 30 minutes
- Episodes: 6
- Manga
- Written by: Noritaka Suzuki
- Published by: MediaWorks
- Imprint: Media Comics
- Magazine: Comic Comp
- Published: 1994
- Manga

Tekkaman Blade II
- Written by: Rei Nakahara
- Published by: MediaWorks
- Imprint: Media Comics
- Published: 1995

Space Knight Tekkaman Blade (Japanese: 宇宙の騎士テッカマンブレード, Hepburn: Uchū no Kishi Tekkaman Burēdo) is a 1992 Japanese anime television series produced by Tatsunoko Production and Sotsu Agency. The series was directed by Hiroshi Negishi and written by Mayori Sekijima and Satoru Akahori. The story follows an organization called the Space Knights and their war against aliens known as the Radam. The Space Knights are assisted by Takaya Aiba, who has the ability to transform into an armored warrior known as Tekkaman Blade.

The first series, of 50 episodes (including episode 0), aired in Japan from February 18, 1992, to February 2, 1993, on TV Tokyo. This was followed by two specials. A sequel series called Tekkaman Blade II, which is set ten years after the first series and follows the events of the second Radam invasion, was a series of six Japanese original video animation (OVA) releases from July 21, 1994, to April 21, 1995. A video game based on the series, titled Uchū no Kishi: Tekkaman Blade, was released in Japan on July 30, 1993. The original series was released internationally, including North America, and was dubbed in English as Teknoman. In the English-dubbed versions, the series was heavily cut compared to the original Japanese version and shortened from 50 to 43 episodes.

== Plot ==
=== Tekkaman Blade ===
In the United Earth Year 192, Earth is under attack from an alien race known as the Radam, which consists of bug-like monsters and armored warriors known as Tekkamen. The Radam's spaceship lies dormant on the dark side of the Moon where the Radam wait for it to be repaired.

Fighting against the Radam is a special defense force called the Space Knights. The group consists of Heinrich von Freeman, the group's commander; Noal Vereuse, the pilot of the Space Knights' ship Blue Earth; Aki Kirasagi, the Blue Earth's navigator; Milly, the communications operator; Levin, a computer mechanic; and Honda, the group's mechanic.

Before the start of the Radam invasion, the exploration ship Argos discovered the dormant Radam spaceship in the outer rings of Saturn. While exploring the ship, the crew were captured by pods and converted into Tekkamen. Before he was fully converted, Takaya Aiba (Tekkaman Blade) was freed by his father, Kozo, and placed into an escape pod; his father then activated the Argos' self-destruct. The Radam crashed on the Moon and began their attacks on Earth.

After spending six months drifting toward Earth, Blade bursts free from his escape pod and attacks the Radam forces, entering into a fight with Tekkaman Dagger (Fritz von Braun). After the fight, Blade crashes on Earth and is found by Noal and Aki, who take him back to their headquarters. Blade is initially hostile towards the Space Knights, but as time progresses, he begins to respect them for their dedication and develops a romantic interest in Aki. With Blade's help, the Space Knights begin to repel the Radam until Blade's transformation crystal is shattered during a battle with Dagger. Levin develops a battle robot named Pegas, which houses the shards of Blade's crystal and enables him to transform again. In his first transformation using Pegas, Blade challenges Dagger and kills him.

Meanwhile, Earth's ambitious military leader, General Colbert, becomes obsessed with acquiring the Tekkaman armor for his own use. He attempts to attack the Space Knight's base during an emergency, but is forced to withdraw by order of Earth's president. He later sends in the spy Balzac Asimov, posing as a journalist, to infiltrate the Space Knights. Balzac acquires data on the Tekkaman armor system and Earth's military create their own Tekkamen armor, which are worn by Balzac and Noal. Eventually, General Colbert is killed by Blade when he tries to use a weapon that would harm both the Radam and mankind.

Four more Tekkamen – Tekkaman Lance (Molotov), Tekkaman Axe (Goddard), Tekkaman Sword (Hun-Ri) and Tekkaman Evil (Takaya's twin brother Shinya) – arrive on Earth to challenge Blade. Tekkaman Rapier (Takaya's younger sister Miyuki) also arrives on Earth, but like Blade she is not under the Radam's control. Evil, Lance, Axe, and Sword attack the Space Knights' base and attempt to kill Rapier. Although outnumbered, Rapier self-destructs in an attempt to destroy the four Tekkamen. Blade manages to kill Lance and Axe and he later gains the power to attain Blaster Tekkaman mode, although he loses more of his memories whenever he uses it. Evil is given the same ability as the last line of defense for the Radam's leader, Tekkaman Omega.

At the end of the war, Blade and Evil meet for the last time, where Blade kills Evil after a long fight. As he dies, Evil is freed from the Radam's mind control. Balzac kills Sword and they both burn up in Earth's atmosphere.

Blade takes Pegas to the Moon, where he confronts Omega, who reveals that he is Takaya's older brother Kengo. Omega launches the repaired Radam spaceship and heads for Earth. Blade attacks Omega, who easily defeats him. Omega is about to kill Blade when Pegas steps in front of the killing blow and sacrifices himself. Pegas' destruction enrages Blade and causes him to transform into Blaster Tekkaman mode for the last time. Blade kills Omega and causes the Radam spaceship to explode. The remnants of the Radam spaceship fall to Earth along with Blade, now stripped of his armor. As a result, Blade is left reliant on a wheelchair and is completely amnesiac, cared for by Aki.

=== Tekkaman Blade II ===
This six-episode series is set ten years after the original series and a new group of Space Knights confront the Radam. The group features Yumi Francois, Aki, Natasha, David and their mysterious leader, D-Boy. Tekkaman Blade joins them to fight the sinister alien enemy, but things become complicated by the appearance of Dead End. He blames the Space Knights for the destruction of the Tekk-plant at Prague after it was conquered by revolutionary generic Tekkamen.

See individual episode summaries below.

== Production ==
The series itself was conceived as being a re-imagining of the 1975 anime, Tekkaman: The Space Knight which was also by Tatsunoko Production. During production, the show was initially called "Space Knight Tekkaman Cyber", and even when it was announced in anime magazines, it was tentatively called "Tekkaman Cyber". The planning for the series was done by Kouki Narishima and Mitsushige Inagaki while Motoki Ueda would serve as producer on Tatsunoko's behalf. The series' main sponsor which was Bandai's hobby division wanted a series that had a lot of name recognition, so Tekkaman: The Space Knight was ultimately chosen amongst other works that Tatsunoko owned. Other potential candidates such as Science Ninja Team Gatchaman were suggested, but Tekkaman was chosen because Gatchaman proved difficult to make into model kits and Ueda himself was more of a fan of the original Tekkaman. Initial plans for the plot were to have the main protagonist's family members becoming his enemies, but was later changed to have his brother be his enemy. This plot point was taken from a prior Tatsunoko anime which Ueda previously produced being Legend of Heavenly Sphere Shurato, in which the main character fought against his best friend who was brainwashed by the main antagonists. Coincidentally, Takehito Koyasu, who voiced Gai in Shurato, would later voice Shinya Aiba in this series. In another coincidence, Shurato had armor that was white and red, while Gai sported a set of black and red armor, which likely influenced Blade and Evil's color schemes in the final product. Shurato proved to be popular with female viewers, but the plastic model sales were not, so this series was created for males with model kits in mind, and the only element that would appeal to females was Shinya.

Character designs were done by Hirotoshi Sano and Tomonori Kogawa (credited under the name TOIIIO in the opening and end credits), however, due to a busy schedule, Sano was only able to draw the main protagonist, heroine, and three female characters. Kogawa was originally requested to join as a director, but when he was invited, he was asked not only to direct but also to design and thus drew the remaining characters in place of Sano. Kogawa was also involved in the series as an animation director under the pseudonym Aiba Kouu.

Yutaka Izubuchi was originally going to provide the Tekkaman designs, but due to him also being busy, he was only able to draw a couple of rough design sketches. The rough designs were then done by Yoshinori Sayama, an apprentice of Izubuchi's who had been working with Izubuchi to help make design materials to present to the series' sponsors and producers. When Ueda saw the rough designs, he was convinced that Sayama could do it, but Bandai couldn't decide whether they could sell the designs or not, so a competition was held among more than a dozen designers, which Sayama ultimately won. Sayama was not familiar with the original Tekkaman's design, but Ueda suggested that he work on it without looking at the original design, and would only gave him his impressions. Finally, Kaoru Wada, who was the composer, was told that he did not need to be familiar with the music from the original Tekkaman when composing the series' score.

== Episodes ==
=== Tekkaman Blade ===
Tekkaman Blade was broadcast in Japan on TV Tokyo and 50 episodes were aired between February 18, 1992, and February 2, 1993. It uses four pieces of theme music: two opening themes and two ending themes. The first opening theme is "Reason" by Yumiko Kosaka, which is used from the first through twenty-seventh episodes. The second opening theme is "Eternal Loneliness" (永遠の孤独) by Yumiko Kosaka, which is used from the twenty-eighth episode onwards. The first and second ending themes are "Energy of Love" and "Lonely Heart" respectively, both performed by Kosaka.

In 1995, the series was dubbed in English by Saban Entertainment for UPN Kids, under the name Teknoman. Their dub featured a new theme song and background score by Shuki Levy and Ron Wasserman (Mighty Morphin Power Rangers, X-Men, Dragon Ball Z). The American broadcast version was heavily cut compared to the original Japanese version and shortened from 50 episodes to 43. Saban's dub also aired in Australia during 1995 and 1997, on Network Ten's Cheez TV morning cartoon block.

The series was licensed by Media Blasters Entertainment, through its AnimeWorks label in 2006, with separate boxsets for Teknoman and Tekkaman Blade.

The rights to the edited Saban/UPN Kids TV dub version of Teknoman was owned by Disney Enterprises thru BVS Entertainment, after Disney acquired the Fox Family/Fox Kids Worldwide franchise in 2001, while Media Blasters/AnimeWorks owns the rights to the International dub of Teknoman in 2006, after they released this dub, along with the uncut Tekkaman Blade on Region 1 DVD.

The character names were altered for the English-dubbed Teknoman release: Blade's "D-Boy" nickname was dropped in favor of "Blade" (in the edited UPN TV version, it was changed to "Slade") and his full name "Takaya Aiba" became "Nick Carter". Similarly, "Commander Heinrich von Freeman" became "Commander Jamison", "Noel" became "Ringo Richards", "Aki" became "Star Summers", "Milly" became "Tina Corman", "Levin" (an effeminate male in the original Japanese version) became the female "Maggie Matheson", "Honda" became "Mack", and "Miyuki" became "Shara". The "Radam" were now called "Venemoids" and their leader "Omega" became "Darkon".

In January 2016, the series was released as a remastered Blu-Ray boxset in Japan. The set contains all 50 episodes of the first series and all 6 episodes of the second series, as well as the OVA specials from the laserdiscs, an unreleased episode entitled "Virgin Memory", and a new video interview with Toshiyuki Morikawa.

No. (JP)	No. (US)	Title	Written by	Original air date
0	−	"(A Fierce Battle Begins)" "Nagaki tatakai no jokyoku" (長き戦いの序曲)	Unknown	February 18, 1992
1	1	"Friend or Foe (The Sky-Soaring Super Man)" "Ama kakeru no chō jin" (天駆ける超人)	Mayori Sekijima	February 25, 1992
2	2	"Invasion (The Lonely Warrior)" "Kodoku no Senshi" (孤独の戦士)	Satoru Akahori	March 3, 1992
3	3	"Power of the Space Knights (The Defense Army's Ambition)" "Bōeigun no yabō" (防衛軍の野望)	Nobuaki Kishima	March 10, 1992
4	4	"Falling Star (Senseless Desertion in the Face of the Enemy)" "Riyūnaki tekizentōbō" (理由なき敵前逃亡)	Hiroyuki Kawasaki	March 17, 1992
5	5	"Time's Up (Kill Me!)" "Ore wo korose" (オレを殺せ)	Hiroyuki Kawasaki	March 24, 1992
6	6	"Shattered Crystal (Tekk-set Impossible)" "Tekkusetto funō" (テックセット不能)	Katsuhiko Chiba	March 31, 1992
7	7	"Teknobot (Launch of the Mobile Unit Pegas)" "Kidōhei Pegasu Hasshin" (機動兵ペガス発進)	Seiko Watanabe	April 7, 1992
8	8	"Snapshot (The Mysterious War Correspondent)" "Nazo no Jūgunkisha" (謎の従軍記者)	Satoru Akahori	April 14, 1992
9	9	"Convoy (Rescue! The Jupiter Crew)" "Kyūshutsu! Mokusei Kurū" (救出! 木星クルー)	Nobuaki Kishima	April 21, 1992
10	10	"Bold Soldier Boy (A Lullaby Echoing in War)" "Senka ni hibiku komori uta" (戦火に響く子守歌)	Hiroyuki Kawasaki	April 28, 1992
11	−	"(The D-Boy File)" "Dboui Fairu" (Dボウイファイル)	Satoru Akahori	May 5, 1992
12	11	"Brother Beware (The Red Horror, Evil)" "Akai Senritsu Ebiru" (赤い戦慄エビル)	Katsuhiko Chiba	May 12, 1992
13	12	"Sibling Rivalry (Brothers of Destiny)" "Shukumei no Kyōdai" (宿命の兄弟)	Nobuaki Kishima	May 19, 1992
14	13	"Family Feud (Demon Tied by Blood)" "Chi wo waketa akuma" (血をわけた悪魔)	Seiko Watanabe	May 26, 1992
15	14	"Saber Strike (The Evil Spirit Revives)" "Majin yomikaeru" (魔神蘇る)	Satoru Akahori	June 2, 1992
16	15	"Spy Game (Portrait of Betrayal)" "Uragiri no shōzō" (裏切りの肖像)	Satoru Akahori	June 9, 1992
17	16	"Sword and Steel (Savior of Steel)" "Kōtetsu no Kyūseishu" (鋼鉄の救世主)	Nobuaki Kishima	June 16, 1992
18	17	"The Visitor (The Price of Glory)" "Eikōhe no daishō" (栄光への代償)	Nobuaki Kishima	June 23, 1992
19	18	"Battleground (Warrior With a Closed Heart)" "Kokoro tozashita Senshi" (心閉ざした戦士)	Seiko Watanabe	June 30, 1992
20	19	"Resurrection (Resurrected! Transformation of Rage)" "Fukkatsu! Ikari no Henshin" (復活! 怒りの変身)	Kuniaki Yamashita	July 7, 1992
21	20	"Mind Game (Premonition of Love and Death)" "Ai to Shi no Yokan" (愛と死の予感)	Hiroyuki Kawasaki	July 14, 1992
22	21	"Decision (Miyuki's Decision)" "Miyuki no Ketsui" (ミユキの決意)	Kuniaki Yamashita	July 21, 1992
23	22	"Reunion (The Scarred Reunion)" "Kizu darake no saikai" (傷だらけの再会)	Katsuhiko Chiba	July 28, 1992
24	23	"In the Beginning (The Torn-Open Past)" "Hiki sakareta kako" (引き裂かれた過去)	Nobuaki Kishima	August 4, 1992
25	24	"Shara's Secret (New Demons)" "Aratanaru Akuma" (新たなる悪魔)	Hiroyuki Kawasaki	August 11, 1992
26	−	"(Battle to the Death)" "Shi wo kaketa tatakai" (死をかけた戦い)	Kuniaki Yamashita	August 18, 1992
27	25	"Forget Me Not (Legacy for the Survivors)" "Nokorishi monohe no Isan" (残りし者への遺産)	Satoru Akahori	August 25, 1992
28	26	"Chronicle (The White Majin)" "Shiroi Majin" (白い魔人)	Satoru Akahori	September 1, 1992
29	27	"Red Saviour (A Bouquet of Flowers on the Battlefield)" "Tatakai no noni Hanataba" (戦いの野に花束を)	Seiko Watanabe	September 8, 1992
30	28	"Running on Empty (Traces of Father)" "Chichi no Omokage" (父の面影)	Nobuaki Kishima	September 15, 1992
31	29	"Tekno Trap (Town of Vengeance)" "Fukushū no Machi" (復讐の街)	Kuniaki Yamashita	September 22, 1992
32	30	"Lady in Waiting (The Girl Who Waits Impatiently)" "Machiwabita Shōjo" (待ちわびた少女)	Katsuhiko Chiba	September 29, 1992
33	31	"Reformation (Reunion in the Wilderness)" "Kōya no Saikai" (荒野の再会)	Satoru Akahori	October 6, 1992
34	−	"(Brothers of Light and Shadow)" "Hikari to Kage no Kyōdai" (光と影の兄弟)	Nobuaki Kishima	October 13, 1992
35	32	"Ax Trap (Enemy in the Fog)" "Kiri no Naka no Teki" (霧の中の敵)	Kuniaki Yamashita	October 20, 1992
36	33	"Ax Attack (A Decisive Battle!! Axe)" "Kessen!! Akkusu" (決戦!! アックス)	Seiko Watanabe	October 27, 1992
37	34	"On Ice (The Decayed Body)" "Mushibamareta nikudai" (蝕まれた肉体)	Kuniaki Yamashita	November 3, 1992
38	−	"(Labyrinth of Death)" "Shihe no meikyū" (死への迷宮)	Katsuhiko Chiba	November 10, 1992
39	−	"(Super Warrior Blaster)" "Chō Senshi Burasutā" (超戦士ブラスター)	Nobuaki Kishima	November 17, 1992
40	−	"(The Love and Struggle of Two People)" "Ai to Tatakai no Ninin" (愛と戦いの二人)	Satoru Akahori	November 24, 1992
41	35	"Fifty-Fifty (Evil, The Resurrected Devil)" "Ebiru Yomikaeru Akuma" (エビル·蘇る悪魔)	Kuniaki Yamashita	December 1, 1992
42	36	"Evolution (Clash! The Old Red Enemy)" "Gekitotsu! Akai Jukuteki" (激突! 赤い宿敵)	Satoru Akahori	December 8, 1992
43	37	"Reflection (Bullet of Parting)" "Ketsubetsu no jūdan" (訣別の銃弾)	Hiroyuki Kawasaki	December 15, 1992
44	38	"Amnesia (The Approaching Darkness)" "Semari kuru Yami" (迫り来る闇)	Nobuaki Kishima	December 22, 1992
45	39	"Metamorphosis (The Truth of the Invaders)" "Shinjitsu no shinryakusha" (真実の侵略者)	Satoru Akahori	January 5, 1993
46	40	"Sword Strike (The House Where Time Stood Still)" "Toki no tomatta ie" (時の止まった家)	Mayori Sekijima	January 12, 1993
47	41	"Battle of the Space Ring (The Fate of Darkness and Death)" "Yami to Shi no Unmei" (闇と死の運命)	Kuniaki Yamashita	January 19, 1993
48	42	"Beginning of the End (Heroic! Evil Dies)" "Sōretsu! Ebiru Shisu" (壮烈! エビル死す)	Satoru Akahori	January 26, 1993
49	43	"Final Battle (Life Burns Out)" "Moetsukiru inochi" (燃えつきる命)	Mayori Sekijima	February 2, 1993

=== Specials ===
These OVA specials were originally included in the Crystal Box laserdisc set and later included as special features for the DVD and Blu-Ray releases.

No.	Title	Original release date
1	"Burning Clock" "Moeta Tokei" (燃えた時計)	May 6, 1998
In his last moments before his death, Shinya's life is shown in a series of flashbacks, focusing on Shinya and Takaya's rivalry, Shinya's perceived place in the family, and how his mother died.
2	"Twin Blood"	May 6, 1998
Tekkaman Blade and Evil's first battle is retold with different character designs than used in the series. Blade and Evil's Tekkaman forms have also been redesigned to have a more techno-organic feel to them. The new Tekkamen designs were provided by Yutaka Nakamura.
–	"Stage 0: Missing Link" (「MISSING-LINK」)	May 6, 1998
A prequel to Tekkaman Blade II, showing events such as the beginning of the second Radam war, Aki's transformation into the Red Tekkaman, the Tekkaman Rebellion of Prague, and the restoration of Blade's crystal.

=== Tekkaman Blade II ===
Tekkaman Blade II (宇宙の騎士テッカマンブレードII, Uchu no Kishi Tekkaman Burēdo Tsū; lit. Space Knight Tekkaman Blade II ) is a six-episode original video animation (OVA) that was released in 1994 by Tatsunoko and serves as a sequel to the Tekkaman Blade anime series. The series was originally licensed by Urban Vision on VHS in 1998 and later released on DVD in 2001, before later being picked up by Discotek Media in 2012 for an uncut home-media release on DVD and Blu-Ray format, with English dubbing and subtitles as options. The series aired on Starz Encore's Action Anime programming block in 1999.

No.	Title	Original air date
1	"Stage 1: The New Generation – Part 1" (Virgin Flush) (「VIRGIN-FLUSH」)	July 21, 1994
The United Earth Fleet fights off another Radam invasion, but the Radam Tekkamen wipe out the fleet and send missiles to Earth. This causes errors during the Tekkaman conversion process for three new Space Knight cadets, and Yumi is given the Reactor Voltekka instead of Natasha. The Space Knights attack the Radam, but are overpowered. While attempting to help them, Yumi is unable to control the power of the Reactor Voltekka, which leads to a disaster.
2	"Stage 1: The New Generation – Part 2" (Virgin Blood) (「VIRGIN-BLOOD」)	August 24, 1994
Yumi goes through training in order to control the Reactor Voltekka. The Radam attack the Space Knights' HQ. The Space Knights hold back out of mercy for the enemy. Aki joins the fight and kills the Radam Tekkamen.
3	"Stage 2: The Alien Intruder – Part 1" (Virgin Dream) (「VIRGIN-DREAM」)	September 21, 1994
Blade reappears and destroys a group of Radam. Yumi contends with Aki for D-Boy's love.
4	"Stage 2: The Alien Intruder – Part 2" (Dead-Boy) (「DEAD-BOY」)	February 22, 1995
Dead End appears and defeats Blade in space. David tries to prevent this by attacking, but Dead End escapes.
5	"Stage 3: Final Encounter – Part 1" (Dirty Night) (「DIRTY-NIGHT」)	March 24, 1995
David befriends Dead and remembers the events of Black September. Noal is revealed to have been apprehended by the military police supporting the General. His ultimate fate is unknown.
6	"Stage 3: Final Encounter – Part 2" (Dangerous Boys) (「DANGEROUS-BOYS」)	April 21, 1995
Blade battles Dead in a final showdown.

== Merchandise and other media ==
=== Merchandise ===
Model kits based on the series released in Japan by Bandai throughout the show's run, as well as model kits by B-Club, who also made models of the second series. Various Tekkaman Blade action figures have been made over the years, such as Tekkaman Blade and Tekkaman Evil receiving Figmas by Max Factory, a figure of Tekkaman Blade and Pegas was released by Bandai, as well as Bandai also making figure of the series under their Armor Plus line and more recently, Tekkaman Blade received a Riobot figure from Sentinel Toys, with Tekkaman Evil set to receive a Riobot figure at a later date. Orange Cat Industry, a company based in China acquired the rights to produce model kits based on the series and it was re-released in Japan by Wave Corporation.

=== Video games ===
In 1993, BEC published a video game based on the first anime for the Super Famicom (SNES) in Japan. The game has Blade going through various levels in a shoot-em-up-like style where Blade uses his Tek-Lancer to attack, while the boss battles (save for the last fight against Tekkaman Omega) have a 2D fighting game like approach to them. In the year prior, another game which published by Yutaka was a platformer for the Game Boy. In 1994, a real time strategy game based on the first series and sequel OVA for NEC's PC-9801 entitled Tekkaman Blade: Orbital Ring Dakkai Sakusen was released. The game was published and developed by Matrix.

In 2005, Tekkaman Blade debuted in Super Robot Wars J for the Game Boy Advance, an entry in the long-running Super Robot Wars series of crossover strategy RPGs involving various mecha franchises. However, its inclusion in the game caused controversy amongst fans as the show itself has only one proper robot in Pegas, while the title character and a majority of the cast don powered armor to do battle. The first series would later return in 2007's Super Robot Wars W while also featuring the second series, the latter of which made its SRW debut.

Tekkaman Blade would be featured as a playable character in 2010's Tatsunoko vs. Capcom: Ultimate All-Stars for the Wii as one of the five new characters added to the game's roster. In addition, Tekkaman Evil was also planned to appear in the game's roster, but was ultimately scrapped from the final game.

On November 26, 2021, the series was announced to be making a collaboration with the game Iron Saga, a mecha crossover game for mobile devices.

== See also ==
- Tekkaman: The Space Knight
