= Starship Girl Yamamoto Yohko =

Japanese science-fiction anime series

- Cover art of the DVD.

それゆけ!宇宙戦艦ヤマモト・ヨーコ (Soreyuke! Uchū Senkan Yamamoto Yōko)
- Light novel
- Written by: Takashi Shōji
- Illustrated by: Takashi Akaishizawa
- Imprint: Asahi Novels; Fujimi Fantasia Bunko
- Original run: 1993 – 2013
- Volumes: 12
- Manga
- Written by: Takashi Shōji
- Illustrated by: Yōichi Kadoi
- Published by: Fujimi Shobo
- Magazine: Dragon Comics
- Original run: October 9, 1995 – September 9, 1999
- Volumes: 8
- Original video animation
- Directed by: Akiyuki Shinbo
- Produced by: Hiroyuki Yonemasu; Michihisa Abe; Makoto Kubo; Hiroshi Naitō
- Written by: Danji Matsubara (#1); Mayori Sekijima (#2); Yūji Kawahara (#3)
- Music by: Tomoki Hasegawa
- Studio: J.C.Staff; T-Up
- Released: March 6, 1996 – June 5, 1996
- Runtime: 30 minutes
- Episodes: 3
Further information
Original video animation
Starship Girl Yamamoto Yohko II
Directed by	Akiyuki Shinbo
Produced by	Hiroyuki Yonemasu; Michihisa Abe; Hiroshi Naitō
Written by	Mayori Sekijima
Music by	Kazuhiko Toyama; Takeo Suzuki
Studio	J.C.Staff; T-Up
Released	August 6, 1997 – December 22, 1997
Runtime	30 minutes
Episodes	3
Anime television series
Directed by	Akiyuki Shinbo
Produced by	Kazunori Takagi; Eiji Kanaoka; Kōji Asano
Written by	Mayori Sekijima
Music by	Kazuhiko Toyama; Takeo Suzuki
Studio	J.C.Staff; T-Up
Original network	TV Tokyo
Original run	April 4, 1999 – September 26, 1999
Episodes	26
icon

Starship Girl Yamamoto Yohko (Japanese: それゆけ!宇宙戦艦ヤマモト・ヨーコ, Hepburn: Soreyuke! Uchū Senkan Yamamoto Yōko) is a Japanese light novel series written by Takashi Shōji and illustrated by Takashi Akaishizawa from 1993 to 2013. The series received three adaptations by J.C.Staff and Akiyuki Shinbo consisting of two 3-episode OVAs and a 26-episode television series. The anime series was released in the United States by The Right Stuf International on DVD in 2003.

== Synopsis ==
The series is set in 2999 AD, where two factions—TERRA and NESS—are engaged in a space war game to control planets. They fight with spaceships, which have been made to teleport their pilots back to the mother ship upon destruction. This results in the battles having no true casualties. Since the reflexes of people in the 30th century have greatly deteriorated, a TERRA engineer, Curtis Lawson, uses a time machine to go back 1000 years in time. There, he recruits four girls to fight for TERRA.

== Characters ==
Yohko Yamamoto (山本 洋子, Yamamoto Yōko)
(Voiced by: Minami Takayama):

Yohko is an active, sporty but cocky girl. She is a hardcore gamer, preferring space fight simulations, and is occasionally bribed using games. She pilots the Super Strike TA-29, armed with the all-powerful Everblack Cannon. Due to her obsession with games, she is required to put in a 100-yen coin into an arcade-like coin slot to start her starship.

Momiji Kagariya (松明屋 紅葉, Kagariya Momiji)
(Voiced by: Satsuki Yukino (TV)/Shiho Niiyama (OVA)):

Momiji is the second of TERRA's pilots. A long-haired, somewhat masculine girl, she speaks in the Kansai dialect. She's strong willed and a team player. She works part-time at a mini-market. She has a crush on Lawson, and for a short period believed that Yohko was attracted to him. She is the pilot of the Super Storm TA-23, armed with MRLs and Laser Arrays.

Ayano Elizabeth Hakuhouin (白鳳院 綾乃 エリザベス, Hakuhōin Ayano Elizabeth)
(Voiced by: Yuko Miyamura):

Yohko's best friend, Yohko trusts her and believes that Ayano's abilities would outmatch her own in the right circumstances. She's generally quiet and she truly cares and admires Yohko since childhood. She lives with her grandfather, the Master of the Hakuhouin-Ryū Judo Family.

Madoka Midou (御堂 まどか, Midō Madoka)
(Voiced by: Megumi Hayashibara):

She is the main comic relief of the series. She considers herself Yohko's rival, and strives to beat Yohko in all aspects, such as in sports, studies, and even gaming. Her efforts can be observed when she aspires to become a starship pilot, and her diligence in overcoming vertigo. She is very poised but kind of spoiled and happy-go-lucky.

Admiral Zena Leon (Voiced by: Masako Katsuki)

The highest-ranking officer on board the Estanatreich. She was once a TERRA pilot, but was promoted to command. She once fought in a battle with Fluger known as Little Big Horn. She pilots the Super Twister TA-21 in the Zenga tournament, partnered with Fluger.

Curtis Lawson (Voiced by: Yasunori Matsumoto)

A genius engineer. He worked on the time travel machine that is used as the gateway between 1999 AD and 2999 AD.

General Fluger von Meo-Toroll

The commander of Meo's 2nd Fleet, in charge of the Red Snappers—the aces of NESS. He is often represented riding on a white horse, which gives him the image of a knight. He is a capable leader, admired by Rouge and Yohko. Like Admiral Leon, he was also a former starship pilot who had been elevated in rank.

Yohsuke Yamamoto (山本 洋介, Yamamoto Yōsuke)

A clone of Yohko, created by Zenga using the Old Timer's Inheritance. Although biologically a girl, Zenga seems to have brought Yohsuke up to be a man. She first appears in the series as a young child, to observe Yohko's life. Later Yohsuke appears in the series in the guise of a man, and joins Madoka's class on the last day of school.

== Media ==
=== Anime ===
The first OVA series was directed by Akiyuki Shinbo with character designs by Kazuto Nakazawa and music by Tomoki Hasegawa, and produced at J.C.Staff. Each episode was written by a different writer.

The second OVA series featured most of the same returning staff, but with music by Takeo Suzuki and Kazuhiko Toyama; and with screenwriter Mayori Sekijima from the first series acting as series composition writer.

The TV series featured much of the same staff as the second series, but with Akio Watanabe replacing Nakazawa as character designer, and with Shuuichi Kaneko joining as assistant director and Toshiaki Tetsura joining as visual director, (Note: Tetsura is officially credited as visual concept (ビジュアルコンセプト), but Shinbo refers to him as the visual director (ビジュアルディレクター).) the latter of whom director Shinbo described as indispensable to the development of the series. The series was the first collaboration between Shinbo and Watanabe, a relationship that has carried on through the 2020s. For the series, Shinbo wanted to have a more "realistic" approach to the characters while still keeping their "cute" qualities and had found out about Watanabe's work while doing research. He asked J.C.Staff animation producer Yuuji Matsukura to offer the role of character designer to Watanabe; and Watanabe, who knew about Shinbo and was a fan of his directorial debut Metal Fighter Miku (also produced by J.C.Staff), accepted the job. Discussing the narrative aspects of the work, Shinbo discussed the initial story with Sekijima and decided to make a narrative similar to Osamu Dezaki's TV adaptation of Space Cobra. As pre-production started, Shinbo gave up his New Years' vacation in order to storyboard the first episode. Watanabe noted difficulty as both a first-time character designer and chief animation director in-part due to the fact that he had trouble understanding different lenses and perspectives that Shinbo liked to use (such as wide angles, bird's eye views, and worm's eye views). In recommendation, assistant director Kaneko suggested that Watanabe watch the works of Akio Jissoji to better understand the concepts.

== Episodes ==
=== Starship Girl Yamamoto Yohko I (1996) ===
No.	Title	Directed by (Note: Information is taken from the ending credits of each episode.)	Written by	Storyboarded by	Original release date
1	"Stage1: Get Ready!"; Transliteration: "Get Ready!" (Japanese: ゲットレディ!)	Yoshimitsu Oohashi	Danji Matsubara	Akiyuki Shinbo; Yoshimitsu Oohashi	March 6, 1996
2	"Stage2: Nine Ball at Steam Rising Hot-Springs"; Transliteration: "Yukemuri no Nine Ball" (Japanese: 湯けむりのナインボール)	Masami Shimoda	Mayori Sekijima	Katsuichi Nakayama	April 5, 1996
3	"Stage3: Memories of Roses"; Transliteration: "Bara no Memoir" (Japanese: 薔薇のメモワール)	-	Yuuji Kawahara	-	June 5, 1996

=== Starship Girl Yamamoto Yohko II (1997) ===
No.	Title	Directed by	Written by	Storyboarded by	Original release date
1	"Summer Challenger"; Transliteration: "Manatsu no Challenger" (Japanese: 真夏のチャレンジャー)	-	Masashi Kubota	-	August 6, 1997
2	"Nightmare of Legends"; Transliteration: "Densetsu no Nightmarev" (Japanese: 伝説のナイトメア)	-	Mayori Sekijima	-	October 3, 1997
3	"Cinderella of the Cherry Blossom Moonlight"; Transliteration: "Sakurazukiyo no Cinderella" (Japanese: 桜月夜のシンデレラ)	Akiyuki Shinbo; Masashi Ishihama	Masashi Kubota	Katstumi Terahigashi	December 22, 1997

=== Starship Girl Yamamoto Yohko TV (1999) ===
No.	Title	Directed by	Written by	Storyboarded by	Original release date
1	"The Girl with the Blue Eyes"; Transliteration: "Aoi Hitomi no Shoujo" (Japanese: 碧い瞳の少女)	Shuuichi Kaneko	Mayori Sekijima	Akiyuki Shinbo	April 4, 1999
2	"Flap the New Wings!"; Transliteration: "Habatake! Atarashii Tsubasa" (Japanese: はばたけ! 新しい翼)	Hideki Okamomto	Masashi Kubota	Yoshiaki Iwasaki	April 11, 1999
3	"Shining! Madoka's Youth."; Transliteration: "Hikare! Madoka no Seishun" (Japanese: 光れ! まどかの青春)	Kazuhisa Oono	Sumio Uetake	Michio Fukuda	April 18, 1999
4	"Quartet has Formed! The First Battle"; Transliteration: "Quartet Kessei! Hajimete no Tatakai" (Japanese: 四重奏[カルテット]結成! はじめての戦い)	Morio Imura	Kenichi Araki	Morio Imura	April 25, 1999
5	"Menace! Challenge of Red Snappers"; Transliteration: "Kyoui! Red Snappers no Chousen" (Japanese: 脅威! レッドスナッパーズの挑戦)	Ken'ichi Kasai	Mayori Sekijima	Naoyuki Itō	May 2, 1999
6	"Goodbye to the Future"; Transliteration: "Sayonara Mirai" (Japanese: さよなら未来)	Hideki Okamoto	Mayori Sekijima	Michio Fukuda	May 9, 1999
7	"Phoenix Rising"; Transliteration: "Fushichou Tatsu" (Japanese: 不死蝶起つ)	Shintarou Inokawa	Kenichi Kasai	Kai Uganzaki	May 16, 1999
8	"Sometimes be Like a Child who Lost Its Own Motherv"; Transliteration: "Toki ni wa Haha no Nai Ko no You ni" (Japanese: 時には母のない子のように)	Takurou Satou	Masashi Kubota	Yuuji Kawahara	May 23, 1999
9	"Huge Labyrinth"; Transliteration: "Daimeikyuu" (Japanese: 大迷宮)	Norihiko Nagahama	Sumio Uetake	Morio Imura	May 30, 1999
10	"I want to Fly High"; Transliteration: "Takaku Tobitai!" (Japanese: たかく翔びたい!)	Hideki Okamoto	Mayori Sekijima	Yoshiaki Iwasaki	June 6, 1999
11	"Hide and D - The Great Sea Space Battle"; Transliteration: "Hide and D: Uchuu Daikaisen" (Japanese: HIDE AND D 宇宙大海戦)	Masami Shimoda	Kenichi Araki	Masami Shimoda	June 13, 1999
12	"Udon of Separation"; Transliteration: "Wakare no Udon" (Japanese: 別れのうどん)	Shinjirou Ishihara	Masashi Kubota	Naoyuki Itō	June 20, 1999
13	"The Beautiful Demon"; Transliteration: "Utsukushiki Oni" (Japanese: 美しき鬼)	Jirou Fujimoto	Sumio Uetake	Michio Fukuda	December 27, 1999
14	"The Love After Death"; Transliteration: "Shigo no Koi" (Japanese: 死後の恋)	Shintarou Inokawa	Mayori Sekijima	Yuji Moriyama	July 4, 1999
15	"Sleeping Bride"; Transliteration: "Nemureru Hanayome" (Japanese: 眠れる花嫁)	Shuuichi Kaneko	Masashi Kubota	Shuuichi Kaneko	July 11, 1999
16	"Transfer Student With Blue Eyes"; Transliteration: "Aoi Hitomi no Tenkousei" (Japanese: 碧い瞳の転校生)	Hideki Okamoto	Kenichi Araki	Kai Uganzaki	July 18, 1999
17	"Dancing Girl with Two Faces"; Transliteration: "Futaomote no Maihime" (Japanese: 双面の舞姫)	Hideki Okamoto; Nobutake Itou	Sumio Uetake	Nobutake Itou	July 25, 1999
18	"The Masquerade"; Transliteration: "Kamen Butoukai" (Japanese: 仮面舞踏会)	Jirou Fujimoto	Mayori Sekijima	Michio Fukuda	August 1, 1999
19	"Rival Leaders"; Transliteration: "Gun'yuukakkyo" (Japanese: 群雄割拠)	Yoshihi Eda	Kenichi Araki	Morio Imura	August 8, 1999
20	"Blue and Red"; Transliteration: "Ao to Aka" (Japanese: 青と赤)	Shintarou Inokawa	Masashi Kubota	Naoyuki Itō	August 15, 1999
21	"The Four Sisters of Red"; Transliteration: "Kurenai Yon Shimai" (Japanese: 紅四姉妹)	Hideki Okamoto	Sumio Uetake	Michio Fukuda	August 22, 1999
22	"Black Angel"; Transliteration: "Kuro no Tenshi" (Japanese: 黒の天使)	Ken'ichi Kasai	Masashi Kubota	Yasuhiro Geshi	August 29, 1999
23	"Afterimage"; Transliteration: "Zanzou" (Japanese: 残像)	Shintarou Inokawa	Sumio Uetake	Michio Fukuda	September 5, 1999
24	"The Farewell Planet. Hello, Farewell"; Transliteration: "Sayonara no Wakusei" (Japanese: さよならの惑星)	Shuuichi Kaneko	Kenichi Araki	Shuuichi Kaneko	September 12, 1999
25	"Red Killing Rage"; Transliteration: "Akai Satsui" (Japanese: 赤い殺意)	Hideki Okamomto	Mayori Sekijima	Akiyuki Shinbo	September 19, 1999
26	"Confession Behind the Mask"; Transliteration: "Kamen no Kokuhaku" (Japanese: 仮面の告白)	Shintarou Inokawa	Mayori Sekijimam	Yasuhiro Geshi	September 26, 1999

== Notes ==
=== Works cited ===
- Shinbo, Akiyuki (July 27, 2012). 新房語 [Shinbogatari] (in Japanese). Ichijinsha. ISBN 978-4758012591.
