= Slayers The Motion Picture =

1995 Japanese animated film by Hiroshi Watanabe

Slayers – The Motion Picture
- VHS cover of the North American release
- Directed by: Hiroshi Watanabe
- Screenplay by: Kazuo Yamazaki
- Based on: Slayers by Hajime Kanzaka; Rui Araizumi
- Produced by: Tōru Suzuki
- Starring: Megumi Hayashibara; Maria Kawamura
- Music by: Takayuki Hattori
- Production company: J.C.Staff
- Distributed by: Toei Company
- Release date: July 29, 1995
- Running time: 62 minutes
- Country: Japan
- Language: Japanese

Slayers – The Motion Picture, also known as Slayers Perfect (or Slayers the Movie: Perfect Edition) and originally released in Japan simply as Slayers (スレイヤーズ, Sureiyāzu), is a 1995 Japanese animated comic fantasy adventure film directed by Hiroshi Watanabe and written by Kazuo Yamazaki, based on the novels by Hajime Kanzaka. It was the first animated entry released in the Slayers media franchise and received positive reviews from critics. In the film, young sorceresses Lina Inverse and Naga the Serpent reunite to go on vacation to the magical island of Mipross, but they soon find that things there are not quite what they seem and a mighty evil force might be involved.

== Plot ==
The powerful teenage sorceress Lina Inverse and her traveling companion and self-styled archrival Naga the Serpent, having been reunited after Naga was (once again) hired against Lina, obtain two discounted tickets for a tour to the fabled hot springs of Mipross Island. However, they discover almost immediately that those hot springs are fake and the island is controlled by a group of bandits. The two heroines clean up the island from them but learn they have been sent by someone called "the Great Master".

Meanwhile, Lina is repeatedly visited during sleep by an old insistent man that narrates about the love between a heroic boy Rowdy and a young elf girl Meliroon, tragically interrupted by the appearance of a mazoku (demon) named Joyrock that destroyed the city of elves and killed Meliroon. In another dream, between an event and another, Lina discovers that the old storyteller is the young hero himself and he gained the power of elves, with the ability of seeing the future, and that he was the owner of the legendary Sword of Light.

Lina and Naga deliver the most dangerous bandits to the king, who asks Lina to take action against Joyrock. He and the queen were contacted by the old sage Rowdy in dream and he told them the demon came back again to Mipross and is wreaking havoc in the northern part of the island, blocking the natural flux of hot spring's water, so the girl named Lina Inverse is the only able to beat him. Lina is initially reluctant, but in exchange of a reward (and Rowdy's promise to reveal the secret location of a hot spring that make things growing up) she and Naga decide to take action against the demon.

Joyrock shows himself in the form of a frog, then turns into a reptile-like creature and reveals to be the Great Master who pulled the strings of the events that took place on the island. Lina attempts to slay him with her destructive Dragon Slave spell, but he disappears and reappears from the astral plane and injures Lina, who luckily is rescued by Naga and Rowdy. The old sage heals Lina and tells them he could use his magic to get back in time and change history, but the two sorceress must help him defeating the Joyrock from the past. At the same time he casts the spell, the demon appears and kills Rowdy. Luckily, Lina manages to travel in the void of time (Naga is missing at this moment), she meets the young Rowdy and, with the help of the Sword of Light combined with Dragon Slave, they finally destroy the demon. Along with coincidentally rescued Naga, they return to present time.

Before going back to the mainland, Lina remembers she has to visit the hidden hot spring promised by Rowdy, but there she discovers it is a magical water that makes things like vegetables growing older, and not growing bigger as she hoped for her breasts. Shouting angrily to the ghost of Rowdy, Lina runs away in shame, followed by Naga, and they keep on running until late night. During the end credits, it is shown that the inhabitants of Mipross have erected a statue in honor of the two heroes of the island: the young Rowdy and Lina Inverse.

== Cast ==
Character	Japanese voice actor	English dubbing actor
Lina Inverse	Megumi Hayashibara	Cynthia Martinez
Naga the Serpent	Maria Kawamura	Kelly Manison
Rowdy	Osamu Saka	Phil Ross
Joyrock (Michigan J. Joyrock)	Tessho Genda	Tristan MacAvery
Young Rowdy	Minami Takayama	David Bell
Meliroon	Yuri Shiratori	Jessica Calvello
King of Mipross	Mahito Tsujimura	Paul Sidello
Lagos	Norio Wakamoto	Bryan Bounds
Hotel owner	Kazuhiko Kishino	Guil Lunde
Thieves	Chafurin; Daisuke Gouri; Keiji Fujiwara	Rob Mungle; Brett Weaver; Michael Zargarov

== Production ==
Slayers: The Motion Picture was created during the peak of the franchise's popularity, and was produced by J.C.Staff in co-production with Kadokawa Bunko. Unlike the later films in the series, this one was not directly written by the Slayers creator Hajime Kanzaka. According to Helen McCarthy, "in order not to disturb the continuity of the ongoing TV series, writer/director Kazuo Yamazaki opted for a story from a spinoff continuity, the Slayers Special tales set two years before Lina's first meeting with Gourry." There have been rumors during the production about Naga being the protagonist, but the film was focused on Lina.

When ADV Films first acquired the rights to the film, they originally had contacted Lisa Ortiz, who had been the English voice of Lina Inverse in the Slayers TV series, to reprise her role in the film, however she had to turn down the part because of scheduling conflicts. ADV Films was forced to open up a last minute casting call for Lina, and cast Cynthia Martinez, who made her acting debut as Lina in the film. Martinez, who was completely unprepared for the role, later said she believes she made her voice too high pitched. The dub was written, directed and produced by Matt Greenfield, based on a translation by Dan Kanemitsu.

== Release ==
The film was released in Japan on July 29, 1995, distributed by Toei Company. It premiered at Kadokawa Anime Festival 95, screened as a double feature together with Legend of Crystania: The Motion Picture. A 98-page companion guide book (released also in the low-budget "miniartbook" version) was published by Fujimi Shobō in the Dragon Magazine Collection in 1996. The book is divided between a color part with illustrations about the film and its main characters, and the black-and-white part with about the making of the movie. Bandai Visual's home version of the film was released on VHS and LaserDisc in February 1996, and re-released on the DVD as part of the EMOTION the Best Slayers Movie Edition DVD-BOX (EMOTION the Best スレイヤーズ 劇場版 DVD-BOX) collection of all Slayers films in 2010. It was to be included in the collection of digitally remastered Slayers films and OAV series, to be released on Blu-ray Disc in Japan on February 27, 2015, but Bandai Visual briefly cancelled the project, citing production reasons. It was eventually released on October 30, 2015.

Slayers: The Motion Picture was released on VHS and LaserDisc in North America by A.D. Vision on November 11, 1998, followed by the DVD version on May 25, 1999. The VHS version was made available in either dubbed or subbed formats, and both the LaserDisc and DVD versions were bilingual. Another DVD release was compiled later by ADV Films on September 28, 2004, in a remastered disc individually in the "Essential Anime" collection, later released as part of a "Movie Box" set on September 20, 2005, and a "Movies & OVAs" collection box set on October 28, 2008. The film was presented in anamorphic widescreen for the re-releases and an audio commentary by Cynthia Martinez, Kelly Manison (Naga) and Matt Greenfield was also included on the DVDs as a special feature. All DVD releases are now out-of-print as ADV Films has gone out of business and their license has lapsed. The film was also broadcast in the English version by ADV's Anime Network, and was released in Australia and New Zealand by Madman Entertainment, in France by Déclic Images, in Italy by Yamato Video (dubbed to Italian by DEA Digital Editing Audio), and in Germany by ACOG and OVA Films (dubbed to German by Circle of Arts).

=== Soundtrack ===
Slayers: The Motion Picture

Soundtrack album by Takayuki Hattori
- Released: September 9, 1995 (Japan); July 1, 2003 (North America)
- Recorded: 1995
- Genres: Film score, orchestral, J-pop
- Length: 51:53
- Labels: King Records (Japan); ADV Music (North America)

A soundtrack CD for Slayers: The Motion Picture features all the background music and songs from the movie. It was composed by Takayuki Hattori (primarily), Akira Odakura, Shō Goshima and Hidetoshi Satō, arranged by Hattori and Goshima, and directed by Katsuyoshi Kobayashi. The vocal tracks with the lyrics written by Fumie Nazakawa and Satomi Arimori were performed by Megumi Hayashibara and Maria Kawamura. It was originally released in Japan by King Records on September 9, 1995 (KICA-254) and was released in North America by A.D. Vision (ADV Music) on July 1, 2003 (UPC: 702727036323). ADV also released the soundtrack for Slayers Return. The North American ADV release comes with a 14-page insert guide, including a five-page essay "The Wonderful World of Takayuki Hattori's Music" about the film's music and the inspirations behind it (illustrated with SD style character pictures), four pages of character sketches, and a comic strip. Tiffani Nadeau of Mania.com gave it a perfect score of 5/5.

The film's theme song "Midnight Blue" was released as a single CD Midnight Blue (KIDA-108) by Starchild Records on July 21, 1995, and included in Hayashibara's 1996 album bertemu. The songs were also later included in the CD collection The Best of Slayers Vol. 2 (From OVA, Movie & Game).

== Reception ==
Slayers The Motion Picture was met with mostly very positive critical reception, although sometimes with reservations regarding some of the film's aspects. Dave Halverson gave the English language version that "should occupy a slot in any serious collection" a perfect A score in Gamers' Republic, opining it is "emanating everything that is refreshing about anime, from the opening scene to the amazing climax, this is one action/adventure/comedy that never stops delivering on all counts." Halverson wrote the film has "some of the most memorable characters to ever grace an animated feature" coupled with "fluid animation, a superb dub, and an overall flawless production," stating in the closing opinion: "StMP possesses the timeless quality that legends are made of. Do not miss it!" The staff of Screen Junkies ranked it second best comedy anime movie in history, as it "strikes a balance between goofy comedy and magical adventure." The localized version of the film won the 1998 Anime Expo Awards in the category "overall premiere".

Polish fantasy writer Aleksandra Janusz, writing for the magazine Kawaii, hailed the film for its "splendid" animation and opined it was plotwise the best of all Slayers movies. Chris Beveridge of Mania.com gave this "very recommended" film a near-perfect score of A−, while Justin Emerson scored it a full A. According to Sandra Dozier of DVD Verdict, the first film is "one of the more laugh-out-loud installments" of the Slayers anime series and "a great introduction" to it, that "definitely earns the 'Essential' label. It's very tongue-in-cheek and goofy, and if you are okay with that, you'll probably have a good time." DVD Talk's Chris Tribbey "definitely recommended" this "great title from a well-loved franchise," adding: "When ADV gives one of its titles 'Essential Anime' status, they do it for a reason." Adam Arnold from Animefringe rated it a B+, opining that "great characters and fun situations make for an unforgettable viewing experience;" Megan Lavey of Mania.com too gave it a B+. Mania.com's Luis Cruz offered a more moderate praise and a score of B, writing: "Slayers is certainly a franchise worthy of the 'Essential' moniker. The first motion picture provides a good introduction to the main character of the series and to the humor and action you will find in it." The Anime Review too graded it a B. Among some more critical reviews, Marc Marshall of AAW gave it three-and-half stars out of five, stating that "although the mix of weirdness and relatively serious fantasy isn't for everybody, it's quality entertainment if you're in the right mood."

== Sequels and prequel ==
The film's first sequel Slayers Return was released in 1996, along with the OVA series Slayers Special. They were followed by three more films released between 1997 and 1999: Slayers Great, Slayers Gorgeous and Slayers Premium. The film's chronological prequel OVA series, Slayers Excellent, was released in 1998.
