= Slayers Excellent =

1998 original video animation directed by Takashi Watanabe

スレイヤーズえくせれんと (Sureiyāzu ekuserento)
- Genre: Adventure, comedy, fantasy
- Original video animation
- Directed by: Hiroshi Watanabe
- Written by: Hajime Kanzaka; Keiko Watanabe
- Music by: Takayuki Hattori
- Studio: J.C.Staff
- Licensed by: AUS: Madman; EU: ADV Films UK; NA: ADV Films
- Released: October 25, 1998 – March 25, 1999
- Episodes: 3

Slayers Excellent (スレイヤーズえくせれんと, Sureiyāzu ekuserento) is the second set of three Slayers OVA episodes featuring Lina Inverse and Naga the Serpent, following the earlier OVA series Slayers Special. The series was written by Keiko Watanabe basing on the original stories in the light novels by Hajime Kanzaka, directed by Hiroshi Watanabe, and originally released in Japan in 1998–1999.

In the first episode, "Labyrinth" (らびりんす Rabirinsu), Lina and Naga first meet and are forced to battle zombies, ghosts, a vampire, and Naga's own tomfoolery. In the second episode, "A Frightening Future" (恐るべき未来 Osorubeki mirai), Lina is hired to escort a bratty and spoiled daughter of an aristocratic family in a job that will turn out much more challenging than she excepted. In the third episode, "Lina-chan's Lovely Makeover Operation" (リナちゃん・おしゃれ大作戦 Rina-chan oshare dai-sakusen), Lina and Naga take opposite sides in an out-of-control dispute between conservative and risque fashion designers.

== Plot ==
=== "Labyrinth" ===
The episode begins with a retrospective story of Lina Inverse's and Naga the Serpent's original meeting when Naga began her obsession with Lina as her self-proclaimed arch rival. In the present, the two are traveling together when they are directed by residents of a village to the mysterious ruins nearby. After arriving there, however, they are ambushed by zombies and soon realize that this was all just a trap by the villagers as a sacrifice to a vampire dwelling inside an ancient labyrinth.

=== "A Frightening Future" ===
Lina has taken a bodyguard job to take a high-born girl named Sirene to her summer villa. However, when Sirene's selfishness and arrogance becomes too much for Lina, she hires some bandits to pretend to kidnap Sirene in order to demand a ransom from her father. But when she learns that Naga had defeated the bandits she had hired, Lina realizes that it was someone other who really kidnapped Sirene, and so she sets out with Naga to find and save her.

=== "Lina-chan's Lovely Makeover Operation" ===
Lina and Naga get involved in the rivalry between two fashion designers. Lina takes the side of the more traditionally minded Tatiana, while Naga supports Marty and her revealing costumes. The dispute escalates very quickly, which results in the destruction of the fashion studios. When an agreement no longer seems possible, Marty attacks Tatiana with the help of a mobile studio powered by golem magic. Lina and Tatiana, who too knows magic, take refuge in a secret hiding place which is also a moving building, and so begins an ultimate battle for fashion supremacy between the two huge robot-like studios.

== Cast ==
Character	Japanese voice actor	English voice actor
Lina Inverse	Megumi Hayashibara	Cynthia Martinez
Naga the Serpent	Maria Kawamura	Kelly Manison
Steindorf	Sho Hayami	Mike MacRae
Tatiana Diward	Aya Hisakawa	Deanna Julian
Sirene	Kumiko Watanabe	Tiffany Grant
Marty Lenford	Mayumi Iizuka	Ayanna Grundy
Alphonse	Shinichiro Miki	Illich Guardiola
Fitzmeier	Hiroshi Naka	Jason Douglas

== Release ==
Slayers Excellent was originally released in Japan in three parts between October 25, 1998, and March 25, 1999, on VHS and LaserDisc. ADV Films licensed the OVAs and released them on DVD on March 30, 2004. It was included in the collection of digitally remastered Slayers films and OAV series, released on Blu-ray in Japan on October 30, 2015.

The series' ending song "Never Die" with vocals by Masami Okui was released as a four-track single CD (KIDA-174) by Starchild Records on November 27, 1998. It was also later included Okui's 1999 album Best-Est and in the CD collection The Best of Slayers vol. 2 (From OVA, Movie & Game).

== Reception ==
Polish fantasy writer Aleksandra Janusz, writing for the magazine Kawaii, called Slayers Excellent "not much less brilliant" than Slayers Special, noting the second part to in her opinion be the most funny and the third one to be the weakest. Dave Halverson gave Excellent a review score of three-and-half stars out of five in play, opining that while the first episode is indeed excellent, the other two "don't hold a handle" in comparison to the films Slayers Great and Slayers Gorgeous.
