= Slayers Wonderful =

1998 video game

- Cover art
- Developer(s): TamTam
- Publisher(s): Banpresto
- Writer(s): Hajime Kanzaka
- Platform(s): PlayStation
- Release: October 22, 1998
- Genre(s): Role-playing video game
- Mode(s): Single-player

Slayers Wonderful (スレイヤーズわんだほ, Sureiyāzu wandaho) is a role-playing video game developed by TamTam and released by Banpresto for the PlayStation in 1998 exclusively in Japan. It features key voice actors from the Slayers anime versions and a story supervised by the Slayers author Hajime Kanzaka. The game was a big commercial success but received mixed critical reception.

== Gameplay ==
Gourry, Naga and Lina in battle

Slayers Wonderful is a Japanese role-playing video game featuring of a battle system reminiscent of Final Fantasy VII (a mix of a real-time and turn-based, complete with Limit Break-style super attacks), a 2D world map, and an exploration mode for using rotatable 3D isometric-graphics for navigating locations. Illustrated dialogue scenes and several animated cutscenes drive the game's story.

The player's party consists of up to three members, usually including the protagonists Lina Inverse and Gourry Gabriev and an additional character. All characters besides the warrior Gourry can use both physical attacks and various magic spells of several classes (depending on the character), and Naga the Serpent is also able to summon monsters (and, unlike in other media, she can use her sword). The player's choices for the characters' relationships and actions in the game influence their performance in battle and party members can combine their powers for special attacks.

== Plot ==
One day, Lina Inverse and her faithful companion Gourry Gabriev discover that Lina's most powerful spells and Gourry's magical Sword of Light no longer work. They embark on a long journey to find the cause of their sudden loss of power, reuniting with old friends and ultimately getting mixed up in a conflict much bigger than they imagined, a quest to save the world.

== Release and reception ==
Slayers Wonderful was ranked as the #9 most anticipated game of Tokyo Game Show '98 by Dengeki PlayStation. Despite positive foreign previews, the game was released only in Japan. It was commercially successful, reaching #2 on Famitsu's all-platform bestseller chart upon its release; the magazine's own reviewers, however, gave it a mediocre score of just 22/40. Guide books for the game were published by Kadokawa Shoten's Dragon magazine department and by Media Works as a special issue of Dengeki PlayStation.

== See also ==
- List of Slayers video games
