= Déclic Images =

French translation company

- Parent company: Manga Distribution
- Founded: 1999
- Defunct: 14 August 2012
- Country of origin: France
- Fiction genres: Anime
- Official website: declic-images.com

Déclic Images is a French company specialized in the translation and sale of Japanese-style comics for the French-speaking world.

The Déclic Images trademark was founded in 1999. By 2002, the company produced nearly half of all new Japanese anime published in France.

The company's mission is to offer popular series that are accessible to all, containing at a minimum, 26 episodes. Déclic Images produces both recent titles (Love Hina, Fruits Basket, etc.) as well as anime classics such as: Heidi, or Masters of the Universe.

== History ==
In 2002, Déclic Images began offering Japanese copyright holders beneficial license-acquisition offers. Other publishers in the French language anime market, such as Kaze animation and Dybex, were left with the choice between offering competitive prices, falling back on less prestigious titles, or finding undiscovered talent. This was despite the fact that both of the companies' products were distributed by Déclic Images' parent company, Manga Distribution.

At the height of Japanese anime sales in 2005, Déclic Images's sales reached 5.24 million euro. It sold its products in supermarkets, over the Internet and in specialized shops, and in 2004 launched a large marketing campaign that included TV ads. Despite its presence in the market, each product generated only a small profit and Manga Distribution handled its supermarket presence in an unprofitable manner.

After solid growth between 2002 and 2005, with a dozen titles being released per year, the company released Goldorak in August 2005. It was later revealed that Déclic Images did not hold the rights to the title. After extensive judicial travails, a French appeals court confirmed in 2009 a judgment of 4.8 million euro in damages against the company. Several matters remain in the courts, including a 2006 release of Captain Future, about improper licensing rights.

Déclic Images has since gone through a number of restructurings and recovery proceedings, and relies on re-releases of their current library of titles. Déclic was unable to relicense sequels and remakes of previously licensed materials due to eroding relationships with Japanese distributors and producers, such as Full Metal Panic!: The Second Raid and Last Exile: Fam, the Silver Wing. Their last license before they stopped licensing new anime titles was Gakuen Alice. The titles Black Lagoon, Black Lagoon: The Second Barrage, and X were re-licensed by Kazé in 2012, and the company also licensed Black Lagoon: Roberta's Blood Trail. The titles Full Metal Panic! and Full Metal Panic? Fumoffu were re-licensed by Dybex in 2014, and the company also licensed Full Metal Panic!: The Second Raid.

== Anime ==
Over the years, Déclic Images has distributed a number of popular anime series, movies, and OVAs in their network. Déclic Images would either distribute the series through TV or at times become the publisher of the series in France.

- Ai Yori Aoshi (TV) : Distributor
- Ai Yori Aoshi ~Enishi~ (TV) : Distributor
- Alps no Shōjo Heidi (TV) : Distributor
- Astro Boy [1980] (TV) : Distributor
- Attacker You! (TV) : Distributor
- Baki the Grappler (TV) : Distributor
- Basilisk (TV) : Distributor
- Black Lagoon (TV, seasons 1-2) : Distributor (relicensed by Kazé in 2012)
- Blue Gender (TV) : Distributor
- Blue Gender: The Warrior (movie) : Distributor
- Blue Seed (TV) : Distributor
- Blue Seed Beyond (OAV) : Distributor
- Captain Future (TV) : Distributor
- Chrono Crusade (TV) : Distributor
- City Hunter: Death of the Vicious Criminal Ryo Saeba (special) : Distributor
- Cybersix (TV) : Distributor
- D.N.Angel (TV) : Distributor
- Dagger of Kamui (movie) : Distributor
- DT Eightron (TV) : Distributor
- El Hazard: The Alternative World (TV) : Distributor
- El Hazard: The Wanderers (TV) : Distributor
- Flame of Recca (TV) : Distributor
- Fruits Basket (TV) : Distributor
- Full Metal Panic! (TV) : Distributor (relicensed by Dybex in 2014)
- Full Metal Panic? Fumoffu (TV) : Distributor (relicensed by Dybex in 2014)
- Gad Guard (TV) : Distributor
- Galaxy Express 999 Movie : Distributor
- Gankutsuou: The Count of Monte Cristo: Distributor
- Gatchaman '94 (OAV) : Distributor
- Glass no Kamen (TV) : Distributor
- Gravion (TV) : Distributor
- Gravion Zwei (TV) : Distributor
- Gunparade March (TV) : Distributor
- Heat Guy J (TV) : Distributor
- Hikari no Densetsu (TV) : Distributor
- Hikaru no Go (TV) : Distributor
- Infinite Ryvius (TV) : Distributor
- Izumo: Takeki Tsurugi no Senki (TV) : Distributor
- JoJo's Bizarre Adventure (OAV) : Distributor
- Kagaku Ninja-Tai Gatchaman (TV) : Distributor
- Kaleido Star (TV) : Distributor
- Kerokko Demetan (TV) : Distributor
- Kiddy Grade (TV) : Distributor
- Kimagure Orange Road (TV) : Distributor
- Kurenai Sanshiro (TV) : Distributor
- Lady!! (TV) : Distributor
- Last Exile (TV) : Distributor
- Lost Universe (TV) : Distributor
- Love Hina (TV) : Distributor
- Love Hina Again (OAV) : Distributor
- Love Hina Spring Special - I wish Your Dream : Distributor
- Love Hina X'mas Special - Silent Eve : Distributor
- Magical Shopping Arcade Abenobashi (TV) : Distributor
- Maho no Star Magical Emi (TV) : Distributor
- Mahou no Tenshi Creamy Mami (TV) : Distributor
- Meiken Jolie (TV) : Distributor
- Monster Rancher (TV) : Distributor
- Nanaka 6/17 (TV) : Distributor
- NieA 7 (TV) : Distributor
- Nightwalker: The Midnight Detective (TV) : Distributor
- Now and Then, Here and There (TV) : Distributor
- Outlanders (OAV) : Distributor
- Ozu no Mahōtsukai (TV) : Distributor
- Peacemaker (TV) : Distributor
- Princess Nine (TV) : Distributor
- Princess Tutu (TV) : Distributor
- R.O.D -The TV- : Distributor
- Ranma ½ (TV) : Distributor
- Ring ni Kakero (TV) : Distributor
- Robotech (U.S. TV) : Distributor
- Rune Soldier (TV) : Distributor
- SaiKano (TV) : Publisher
- Saiyuki (TV) : Distributor
- Saiyuki Gunlock (TV) : Distributor
- Saiyuki Reload (TV) : Distributor
- Sasurai no Shōjo Nell (TV) : Distributor
- Scrapped Princess (TV) : Distributor
- Seven of Seven (TV) : Distributor
- Shaman King (TV) : Editor
- Shingu: Secret of the Stellar Wars (TV) : Distributor
- Silent Möbius (TV) : Broadcaster
- Slayers (TV) : Distributor
- Slayers - The Motion Picture : Distributor
- Slayers Excellent (OAV) : Distributor
- Slayers Gorgeous (movie) : Distributor
- Slayers Great (movie) : Distributor
- Slayers Next (TV) : Distributor
- Slayers Premium (movie) : Distributor
- Slayers Return (movie) : Distributor
- Slayers Special (OAV) : Distributor
- Slayers Try (TV) : Distributor
- Sonic X (TV) : Editor
- Soul Hunter (TV) : Distributor
- Space Adventure Cobra (TV) : Distributor
- Space Adventure Cobra: The Movie : Distributor
- Speed Grapher (TV) : Distributor
- Tanoshii Moomin Ikka (TV) : Distributor
- The Galaxy Railways (TV) : Distributor
- The Irresponsible Captain Tylor (TV) : Distributor
- Thundercats (U.S. TV) : Distributor
- UFO Robo Grendizer (TV) : Distributor
- Urusei Yatsura (TV) : Distributor
- X (TV) : Distributor (relicensed by Kazé in 2012)
