= Slayers Gorgeous =

1998 Japanese anime film directed by Hiroshi Watanabe

- Theatrical release poster
- Directed by: Hiroshi Watanabe
- Screenplay by: Hajime Kanzaka
- Based on: Slayers by Hajime Kanzaka; Rui Araizumi
- Produced by: Kiminobu Sato
- Starring: Megumi Hayashibara; Maria Kawamura; Akira Kamiya; Kyoko Hikami; Junpei Takiguchi
- Music by: Takayuki Hattori
- Production company: J.C.Staff
- Distributed by: Toei Company
- Release date: August 1, 1998
- Running time: 64 minutes
- Country: Japan
- Language: Japanese

Slayers Gorgeous (Japanese: スレイヤーズごうじゃす, Hepburn: Sureiyāzu Gōjasu) is a 1998 Japanese comic fantasy anime film written by Hajime Kanzaka and directed by Hiroshi Watanabe. Gorgeous is the fourth film in the Slayers saga and the final anime entry in the prequels to the main series. It received mostly favorable reviews, and was followed by the short Slayers Premium in 2001.

In the film, the wandering sorceresses-for-hire Lina Inverse and Naga the Serpent get involved in a war between Lord Calvert and his army and his rebellious teenage daughter Marlene and her legion of dragons. Lina sides with Calvert while Naga goes to work for Marlene.

== Plot ==
Visiting a city, Lina Inverse and Naga the Serpent witness a sudden rampage of the dragon army of the young Marlene and effortlessly repel the attack. Marlene's estranged father Lord Culvert then hires Lina to help stop his daughter's raids. But Naga, Lina's friend-enemy "greatest rival", decides to instead join Marlene's side for a bigger bid.

Lina and Culvert lead the human army for an assault on Marlene's castle. Meanwhile, Naga and Marlene's forces set out as well in the other way, leaving the castle vacant for Lina's magic to level. Naga and Marlene rush back and meet Lina and Culver's army. Marlene has a natural relationship with dragons and is able to command them easily, but her dragons flee after only hearing the very name "Lina Inverse" and Lina quickly defeats Marlene's warlord Thornfort. Lina and Naga meet for a personal duel, from which Lina emerges victorious by sending Naga does a waterfall. Marlene also challenges Lina with her Chaos Sword, but Lina manages to break it after figuring out it was made of wood and Marlene's armor is also fake.

Naga returns to continue her battle with Lina, but then Marlene's other warlord, Gaizno, reveals his real form, transforming himself into a gigantic evil dragon that starts attacking both sides and the city itself. During the great battle, Lina and Naga work together, as Naga succeeds in distracting Gaizno with creative use of magical attacks long enough for Lina to overcome Gaizno's magic defenses and destroy him with her powerful Dragon Slave spell. Gaizno survives, but is reduced to his true form, that of a tiny green tsuchinoko.

Marlene and her father reconcile and end their war, which they waged only over the amount of her weekly allowance money. The land's dragons and humans are also going to live in peace and rebuild the city together. Frustrated at learning the whole reason for the conflict was over something so petty, Lina and Naga leave for their new adventures, as always bickering and fighting each other on their way.

== Cast ==
Character	Japanese voice actor	English voice actor
Lina Inverse	Megumi Hayashibara	Cynthia Martinez
Naga the Serpent	Maria Kawamura	Kelly Manison
Marlene	Kyoko Hikami	Laura Scott
Lord Culvert	Akira Kamiya	John Gremillion
Gaizno	Junpei Takiguchi	Marty Fleck
Thornfort	Kaneto Shiozawa	Paul Hope

== Release ==
The film was theatrically released in Japan on August 1, 1998, distributed by Toei Animation. It was screened as a double feature together with Martian Successor Nadesico: The Motion Picture – Prince of Darkness. Kadokawa Shoten's home version was released on the VHS and LaserDisc in April 1999, and re-released on the DVD alone in 1999 and as part of the EMOTION the Best Slayers Movie Edition DVD-BOX (EMOTION the Best スレイヤーズ 劇場版 DVD-BOX) collection of all Slayers films in 2010. It will be included in the collection of digitally remastered Slayers films and OAV series, released on Blu-ray in Japan on October 30, 2015.

The film was released by ADV Films on the DVD in North America on February 17, 2004. Return was later released by ADV with the other four Slayers movies in a "Movie" boxset, and with the other four movies and both OVA series in a "Movies and OVAs" box set. The English dubbing version was directed and produced by Sandra Krasa. The film was also broadcast in the English version by ADV's broadcast on Anime Network and distributed by Madman Entertainment in Australia and New Zealand, by Déclic Images in France, and by ACOG and OVA Films in Germany (dubbed to German by into German by Circle of Arts).

=== Soundtrack ===
Slayers Great: The Motion Picture "Go"

Soundtrack album by Takayuki Hattori
- Released: September 9, 1998
- Recorded: 1998
- Genres: Orchestral, J-pop
- Label: King Records

A 39-track original soundtrack Slayers Great: The Motion Picture "Go" (KICA-415) was composed by Takayuki Hattori and released on CD in Japan on September 9, 1998. It features three songs with vocals by Megumi Hayashibara: "I & Myself", "Raging Waves" and "Raging Waves (Turquoise Mix)". The songs were later included in the CD collection The Best of Slayers Vol. 2 (From OVA, Movie & Game).

=== Other media ===
A 102-page companion guide book Movie Edition Slayers Gorgeous was published by Fujimi Shobō in the Dragon Magazine Collection in August 1998 (released also in the low-budget "miniartbook" version), followed by Slayers Gorgeous Anime Comic (with a B&W section of production art and character designs) in November 1998. The scripts for Return, Great and Gorgeous were published in the book Slayers Original.

== Reception ==
The film was well received by most Western critics, often regarded as one of the better installments of the franchise. Helen McCarthy included it on her list of essential anime films and gave it a perfect score of A. Dave Halverson of play described Gorgeous as "animation-wise, just that" and with "never a dull moment." Fred Patten of Animation World Network recommended Slayers Gorgeous "both on its own and as a sample for viewers wondering whether to invest in one of the 26-episode Slayers TV series."

The Video Librarian too recommended this "genuinely funny entry" in the Slayers anime series, awarding it 3 out of 4 stars and adding that "what distinguishes this particular episode is an exquisite sense of comic timing and constantly upended expectations." According to Mania.com's Dani Moure, who gave it a score of B, Gorgeous is "a good fantasy-comedy that isn't going to move any mountains, but it will give a lot of laughs and entertainment." Mania.com's other reviewers Mania.com's Chris Beveridge and Megan Lavey scored it a B+ and B−, respectively. John Huxley of Homemademech favorably compared Slayers Gorgeous to Slayers Great: "Both may be of a similar quality but Gorgeous is Goldeneye to Great's Thunderball. The same but better."

Dan Houston of DVD Talk gave Slayers Gorgeous a more cautiously positive review, writing that "much like Slayers Great, the premise of this release was somewhat limited but I can't deny the appeal of the show," and also noting that having less adult innuendo compared other Slayers films "makes this a better volume for kids or younger audiences." Polish fantasy writer Aleksandra Janusz, writing for the magazine Kawaii, opined it was "good enough", even if somewhat weaker than its predecessors. On the other hand, DVD Verdict's Rob Lineberger gave the film a relatively rare negative review, calling it "bland and downright annoying" despite "some amusing bits in the movie." DVD Verdict's review of The Slayers Movie Box by Brett Cullum, however, opined the set "makes for a giggly good time at an affordable price."
