= Slayers: The Motion Picture (soundtrack) =

Soundtrack album by Takayuki Hattori
- Released: September 9, 1995 (Japan); July 1, 2003 (North America)
- Recorded: 1995
- Genre: Film score orchestral J-pop
- Length: 51:53
- Label: King Records (Japan); ADV Music (North America)

Slayers: The Motion Picture (Japanese: スレイヤーズ～THE MOTION PICTURE) is an original soundtrack from the 1995 anime film of the same title. It was released in Japan in 1995 and in the United States in 2003.

The CD features all the background music and songs from the movie. It was composed by Takayuki Hattori (primarily), Akira Odakura, Shō Goshima and Hidetoshi Satō, arranged by Hattori and Goshima, and directed by Katsuyoshi Kobayashi. The vocal tracks with the lyrics written by Fumie Nazakawa and Satomi Arimori were performed by Megumi Hayashibara and Maria Kawamura.

== Release ==
It was originally released in Japan by King Records on September 9, 1995 (KICA-254) and was released in North America by A.D. Vision (ADV Music) on July 1, 2003 (UPC: 702727036323). ADV also released the soundtrack for Slayers Return.

The North American ADV release comes with a 14-page insert guide, including a five-page essay "The Wonderful World of Takayuki Hattori's Music" about the film's music and the inspirations behind it (illustrated with SD style character pictures), four pages of character sketches, and a comic strip. Tiffani Nadeau of Mania.com gave it a perfect score of 5/5.

The film's theme song "Midnight Blue" was released as a single CD Midnight Blue (KIDA-108) by Starchild Records on July 21, 1995, and included in Megumi Hayashibara's 1996 album bertemu. The songs were also later included in the CD collection The Best of Slayers Vol. 2 (From OVA, Movie & Game).

== Track list ==
No.	Title	Length
1.	"Musical Suite 'Slayers SP' (組曲「スレイヤーズ SP.」旅立ち~上弦の月~大地より目覚めよ~リナのテーマ Kumikyoku 'SUREIYĀZU SP.')"	6.25
2.	"Shining Girl"	4.14
3.	"The Brilliant, Beautiful Sorceress Appears (天才美少女魔道士登場 Tensai bishoujo madoushi toujou)"	1.57
4.	"Meriloon (リルーン MERIRŪN)"	1.04
5.	"Zeras Gohto Vs. Cume-Cume Spin!! (ゼラス・ゴート VS キュムキュム・スピン!! ZERASU GŌTO VS kyukyumu SUPIN!!)"	1.17
6.	"Hot Springs Sisters (温泉シスターズ Onsen SHISUTĀZA)"	1.29
7.	"Laughing in the Dark (闇に笑ふ Yami ni warau)"	1.09
8.	"The Promised Land (約束の島 Yakusoku no shima)"	3.09
9.	"Naga the Serpent (白蛇のナーガ Serpent no NĀGA)"	1.34
10.	"A Truly Talented Rival Doesn't Need to Show Off (能あるライバルは爪を隠す Nou aru RAIBARU wa tsume wo kakusu)"	4.34
11.	"Illusion Master (イリュージョンマスター IRYŪJON MASUTĀ)"	1.37
12.	"Ruins of Elngaush (エルンゴーシュの遺跡 ERUNGŌSHU no iseki)"	1.57
13.	"Evil-doer (邪悪なる者 Jaaku naru mono)"	2.19
14.	"Explode! Dragon Slave! (炸裂! ドラグスレイヴ Sakuretsu! DORAGU SUREIBU)"	2.57
15.	"Feelings Across Time and Space (幾万億を超えた想い Ikuman oku wo koeta omoi)"	2.59
16.	"Joyrock (ジョイロック JOIROKKU)"	2.09
17.	"May All the Fools Before Us Be Destroyed By the Power You and I Possess (我と汝の力もて等しく滅びを与えんことを Ware to nanji ga chikara mote hitoshiku horobi wo ataen koto wo)"	2.20
18.	"Ending"	2.52
19.	"Midnight Blue"	5.32
Total length:		51:53
