= Naga the Serpent =

Fictional character from the Slayers franchise

- Slayers character
- Naga in Granblue Fantasy
- First appearance: "Naga's Challenge" (ナーガの挑戦, Nāga no Chōsen) (1990) (Note: A story originally published in Dragon Magazine August 1990 issue (later collected in Slayers Special volume 1: The Prince of Saillune (1991) and adapted to the OVA Slayers Excellent episode 1: "Labyrinth" (1998) by being mixed with the subsequent story of the same name).)
- Created by: Hajime Kanzaka (character); Rui Araizumi (visual design)
- Voiced by: Japanese Maria Kawamura English Kelly Manison (anime films and OVAs) Eva Kaminsky (Evolution-R)

In-universe information
- Aliases: Gracia Ul Naga Saillune (birth name); Nama (living armor)
- Nickname: White Serpent
- Title: Princess (incognito)
- Occupation: Adventurer sorceress
- Family: Amelia (sister); Prince Phil (father)
- Origin: Saillune

Naga the Serpent (Japanese: 白蛇のナーガ), read as Sāpento no Nāga (サーペントのナーガ) is a fictional character in the light novel, anime, manga, radio drama and game versions of Hajime Kanzaka's media franchise Slayers, who was introduced in Dragon Magazine in 1990. She is also often known as Naga the White Serpent, which is a more literal translation from Japanese (白蛇; usually read as shirohebi, lit. 'white snake'), and an early English version by ADV had her name transliterated as "Nahga". The name she is best known by is in reality an alias of Princess Gracia Ul Naga Saillune (グレイシア = ウル = ナーガ = セイルーン, Gureishia Uru Nāga Seirūn).

The character has great magical powers and an unstable but resilient personality. She is particularly obsessed with a fellow wandering sorceress and the central character of Slayers, Lina Inverse. While occasionally referred to as Lina's sidekick and traveling partner, Naga's arrogance and self-imagined rivalry made her just as likely to antagonize Lina during the course of any story. Naga is a few years older than Lina and takes great pride in her much more voluptuous appearance, but like her she has numerous character flaws, often played for comedic purposes. She was well received by anime critics and general audience alike.

Naga's Japanese voice actor is Maria Kawamura, and her English voice actresses are Kelly Manison in the OVAs and movies. In the anime series Slayers Evolution-R, Naga appears as a cameo character named Nama (ナーマ), voiced by Kawamura in Japanese and by Eva Kaminsky in English.

== Character ==
=== Background ===
Naga's real full name is Gracia Ul Naga Saillune, making her the first daughter of the Holy Kingdom of Saillune's crown prince Philionel El Di Saillune and the older sister of Amelia Wil Tesla Saillune. She has one living uncle, Christopher Wil Brogg Saillune, one deceased uncle, Randy Saillune, and a deceased cousin, Alfred Saillune. Her grandfather, Eldoran Saillune, is the king of Saillune, although Philionel acts as regent. Naga's mother was murdered several years earlier by the infamous assassin Booley. The teenage (16 or 17 years old at the time) Naga immediately took revenge and killed him with the crown princess' original spell, Chaos String. After the funeral, the traumatized Naga found the outfit she currently wears inside her mother's closet, and shortly after this, she left home to learn the ways of the world and gain more magic powers. Naga still keeps in touch with her homeland and occasionally she is sent living expenses money through a messenger. All this was disclosed only in interviews with the Slayers creator Hajime Kanzaka, but was hinted in Naga's "White Serpent" nickname (a white serpent being the coat of arms of Saillune). In Slayers Next, Zelgadis states that Saillune has a "runaway princess", also implied to be Naga.

Naga had originally planned to simply challenge to a duel and defeat the famed teenage sorceress Lina Inverse to inherit her supposed title of the "Invincible Dark Lord" (which Naga apparently invented herself). However, as the story progressed, her obsession with Lina has quickly become more complicated and in some ways even more irrational. Naga becomes associate with Lina, is traveling with her supposed archrival and aiding her in battle, yet also often turning against her whenever someone offers Naga enough gain from it. From her side, the cynical and neurotic Lina is often abusive towards Naga and in total disregard of her safety even when they work together (such as repeatedly blowing her away with explosive spells or using her as bait for the enemy), but Naga almost never gets seriously hurt and usually just laughs it off, rarely seen as a serious enemy even when they are fighting. On the other hand, both Naga and Lina also directly saved each other's lives on a number of occasions.

=== Attributes ===
The novels describe Naga as a remarkably beautiful young woman of about 18 or 19 years with a distinguished appearance, long hair (either dark-blue, violet or raven black), and intelligent blue eyes. Tall, very well-endowed, and flaunting her sexuality, Naga is in a striking contrast to the diminutive and insecure Lina. She takes pride in being physically intimidating, preferring a menacing and revealing black leather outfit, which is as a keepsake from her mother but Naga also personally enjoys to wear it (though the exaggerated size of her spiked spaulders is so unpractical that Naga has at times jabbed them in her own face when spellcasting). Naga's introduction in the novels describe it as an old-time 'evil sorceress' fashion style that, according to Lina, used to be popular centuries earlier. The large magic sword that she carries around is purely for a show, and can be only used defensively for blocking and parrying, due to Naga's hemophobia after witnessing the killing of her mother; in effect, she has a severe aversion to the sight of blood which can cause her to faint. To her dismay, Naga, who believes herself to be Lina's "greatest, strongest and final rival", is often referred to as Lina's sidekick or "that other girl". The usually dismissive Lina likes to compare Naga's irritating habit of following her around as akin to goldfish's trailing feces (in the words of Lina: "She might be a useless ally, but having her as an enemy can sure be amusing"). However, Naga also often makes her very annoyed (even to the point of rage), especially when Naga makes fun of her small breasts, playing on Lina's physical inferiority complex and her envy of Naga's bust size.

Naga is much more graceful than Lina and has an outrageously loud boisterous 'noblewoman' (ojousama) laugh (which Kanzaka said is similar to the laughter of Naga's mother) that most people in the Slayers world find unbearably obnoxious (to the point of rendering them physically powerless). While a princess, Naga does not boast of that (her heritage is never mentioned in any series and has only been acknowledged in interviews and supplemental materials), however the way she acts makes it quite apparent: when she stands before other members of royalty, she speaks to them as equals, while Lina will bow her head and speak only when spoken to. Many of her very self-confident and 'dramatic' poses and speeches are similar to those of Amelia or Martina, another Slayers princess. Naga's inflated ego, her carefreeness and vanity, recurrent appetite for good food, considerable greed for money and magical treasure, frequent and excessive drinking of alcohol, and often-displayed overconfidence along with her notable lack of common sense (including a notorious tendency to have her careless and ill-considered spells to backfire), all mean she often gets herself, and Lina, into trouble.

=== Abilities ===
Despite Lina's mockery of Naga's magical skills, she is an exceptionally talented sorceress, and may, in fact, be Lina's greatest rival. She is well versed in black magic and capable of casting healing spells and golem-forming and dragon-conjuring spells. Naga is especially proficient at white magic, though she only uses it when absolutely necessary, and also specializes in shamanistic magic, in particular spells of earth and water and ice variety. She enjoys creating golems (even if they usually do not turn out very well and sometimes go berserk and turn against her), has developed several of her own spells (including Bogardic Elm, Freeze Rain, Gu Ru Dooga, Mega Vu Vraimer, Void Breath and Vu Raywa), and her most common spells to use are water/ice-based (such as Freeze Arrow) in contrast to Lina who uses fire-related ones. Naga knows and can use the ultimate shamanistic and white magic spells (Ra Tilt and Resurrection), is able to stop living-dead powered via necromancy with a powerful Flow Break spell, and has learnt Levitation by just observing its use by Lina. According to Kanzaka, Naga and Lina are the mightiest human magic users in the world of Slayers and Naga actually has a larger potential magical capacity, while Lina knows the ultimate black magic spells (notably the devastating Dragon Slave). One of Naga's roles is that she is "constantly reminding Lina that however great her magic, she is still lacking in this regard."

She also has an ability to control jellyfish, and is skilled at hand-to-hand combat (punching and kicking), as well as talented artistically and good at cooking. She carries around a large sword yet never uses it. Naga's un potential to survive any dangerous situation was surprising to Lina, who has actually left her for dead on a few occasions, before she got used to it and began to take it for granted.

== Appearances ==
=== Novels and drama CDs ===
Naga has first appeared in the 1991–2008 Slayers Special series of light novels, which was later (from volume 30 onward) re-titled as Slayers Smash (an ongoing series since 2008). Like in the case of other Slayers novels, most of the Special series stories were first published in Dragon Magazine. Some of them were first collected in the Slayers Delicious series and some are subtitled as "Slayers Excellent" or "Slayers Superior"; some were also later re-published in the series Slayers Select. The Special series, which axis are the joint adventures of Lina and Naga, serves as a prequel to the main series (starting about three years prior to the first meeting of Lina and Gourry Gabriev) and is less serious in its content. Naga is the main protagonist of Slayers Special 3: Nāga no Bouken ("Adventures of Naga") and is the titular subject of the 2012 bonus book Slayers Addition: Nāga Ijin-den ("Legend of Naga the Great"). An exclusive side-story of Lina and Naga, "Slayers Gaiden", was published in the issue #200 of Dragon Magazine in 2002.

Hajime Kanzaka was originally going to make Naga appear in The Battle of Saillune (volume 4 of the main novel series) but had a trouble to implement this idea properly. This led him to create the character of Amelia. Kanzaka said Naga would not appear in the main series due to Amelia being there, but the two actually meet in Slayers VS Orphen, a novel and CD drama crossover of Slayers and Sorcerous Stabber Orphen, where the masked Naga appears incognito and keeps her identity secret to Amelia.

Naga also appears in the first volume of Kadokawa Shoten Tsubasa-published alternative series of Slayers children's novels written by Nambo Hidehisa, where her outfit was redesigned to be a less skimpy (wearing a miniskirt instead of a thong) by the artist Yuji Himukai. When they first meet, Lina mistakes Naga for Gourry's mother due to their similar looks and guesses she is "about 40 years old."

The 2006 audio drama Slayers Kita Kaette EX #4: Kita kaette Naga!? provides a closure to the entire Slayers saga, with the retired Lina and Naga, now elderly in their eighties (with almost all other characters already dead) and vacationing together. After Lina revives the choking Naga (who meets her mother in a near-death experience), the two recall their past but their versions do not match, leading Lina to challenge Naga to a final fight as to decide who is right. The battle ends in both of them trying to cast top-level black magic spells (Naga's Dynast Brass and Lina's Dragu Slave) but breaking their own hips in the process.

=== Anime and manga ===
Naga is co-protagonist of the first four Slayers films from the late 1990s: Slayers: The Motion Picture (Slayers Perfect), Slayers Return (and its manga adaptation), Slayers Great, and Slayers Gorgeous (the scripts for Return, Great and Gorgeous were also published in the book Slayers Original). She has the same role in all episodes of both of the Slayers OVA series, Slayers Special, and Naga-centered Slayers Excellent (the latter of which takes place before the events of the first Slayers film, 1995's Slayers Perfect, and in fact details Naga's initial meeting with Lina). A typical plot of a Lina and Naga anime story features them as mercenary companions-opponents (that relationship being very fluid) meeting weird strangers who then hire the two against each other for their own hidden purposes.

Naga's frequent role in the anime is that of a comedic foil to Lina. According to Helen McCarthy, while the Slayers TV series has "remained essentially asexual", it was "the absence of TV restrictions" that allowed to "retain Naga from the [light novel] stories." Naga's Japanese voice actress Maria Kawamura said she had trouble breathing after recording sessions of Naga's laugh for the Slayers Special episode "The Scary Chimera Plan", which featured Naga's ten clones all laughing at once. Kawamura also provided an audio commentary for all the movies and OVAs in the 2015 Blu-ray release.

In the manga, Naga appears through the early 2000s series Slayers Special. Some of the chapters are based on the novels and the OVA series and some are original stories. As described by Jason Thompson, "the two bickering heroines go on dungeon crawls, work as maids and waitresses, search for 'bosom growth potions,' and fight the occasional bad guy."

Naga makes only a cameo appearances in the 2001 film, manga and CD drama Slayers Premium (as is the tradition with all of the anime movies and series published thus far, Naga does not actually meet or interact with any of the main characters other than Lina & Amelia) and in the 2008 manga The Hourglass of Falces. She also makes a possible cameo in the first season of the Slayers TV series (episode 17) and appears as Nama in the first six episodes of the fifth TV season, Slayers Evolution-R.

=== Games ===
Naga appears as a supporting player character through the entire official series of the Slayers role-playing video games from the 1990s: Slayers for the PC98, Slayers for the Super Famicom (SNES, in a dual role including as a boss during the first encounter), Slayers Royal, Slayers Royal 2, and Slayers Wonderful, at times interacting with some members of the main story party (often with Gourry). She and Lina are also featured as player characters in the 2008 game Magical Battle Arena. In 2016, Naga, Lina and Gourry were announced to make guest appearances in Granblue Fantasy. She also appeared with Lina in Valkyrie Anatomia in 2018, and with Lina and others in Puzzle & Dragons and LINE Rangers in 2019, later returning to Puzzle & Dragons as a special event boss in 2021. Her costume was furthermore featured in 2020 collab events in Tales of the Rays as worn by Natalia Luzu Kimlasca-Lanvaldear and by the succubus Albedo in Overlord: Mass for the Dead, and Naga herself joined Tales in 2023. In another collaboration event, she could be summoned in Elemental Story in 2023.

The first setting book published for the Japanese tabletop role-playing game MAGIUS RPG was Slayers RPG: Together with Naga (スレイヤーズRPG—ナーガ様といっしょ) focused on Naga and her antics. In this fast-paced, gag-based comedic game released by Fujimi Shobo in 1995, the game master-controlled Naga has her own party of player characters; it later saw a release of the collection of illustrated transcripts of play sessions. She is also featured in several cards in the collectible card game Slayers Fight.

=== Other appearances ===
Kawamura's image songs for Naga were included in several Slayers soundtracks. Naga-themed single CD A Skilled Rival Conceals Her Claws (能あるライバルは爪を隠す, Nou aru raibaru wa tsume o kakusu) (KIDA-109) was released by King Records in 1995.

A plushie of Naga was made by Banpresto in 1995, a PVC figure was released by MegaHouse in 2003, another pre-painted figure was released by Kadokawa as a tie-in for Return, and a small keychain figure of Naga was made by Toei in 1997. A 1/6 scale garage kit Naga figure sculpted by Kitahara Kousuke was released by Volks in 2012; a tiny figure called "Naga's golem" was also sold by Volks separately in a limited offer and is now available together with the main statuette. A Nendoroid figure was released in 2019, and a Naga perfume was offered in Nakano Broadway's Fairy Tail store in 2023.

== Derived characters ==
=== Nama ===
"Nama" in Evolution-R

Either Naga or one of her clones makes an extended cameo appearance in the 2009 Slayers TV series Slayers Evolution-R as an animated suit of armor calling herself Nama, who bears a striking resemblance to Naga in both mannerisms (including her laugh) and spellcasting preferences. Nama was a treasure hunter, of whom only her shadow is actually shown and who has lost a majority of her memories when her soul got enchanted into the living armor. While it is never directly shown or confirmed to the audience or the characters that she is Naga, Nama is perfectly able to perform the Pacifist Crush move along with Amelia, something only a daughter of Prince Phil would know how to do, and Xellos makes a comment that the name Nama is very close to her actual name, implying that he knows her true identity. During the course of the series, Xellos makes Nama's spirit return to her original body by destroying the urn that has caused the curse.

=== Naga copies ===
After the events of Slayers Special, there are ten clones of Naga due to her participation in a chimera experiment of the wizard Diol. The copies are just like Naga (complete with the attire and the infamous laugh), except that they do not possess any of her memories and magical abilities. They also show up in the Slayers video games Slayers Royal and Slayers Wonderful, the latter of which includes the copies #5 and #9 among playable characters in one part of the story.

Following the use of the Shadow Reflector by the sorcerer Lagen in the Slayers Special story "Mirror, Mirror", there is also a copy of Naga called Shadow Naga that does have her skills, but has a completely opposite personality (a shy, meek and extremely modest girl). Kanzaka said that Shadow Lina and Shadow Naga will both just live a quiet and peaceful life.

== Reception and cultural impact ==
Naga the Serpent was originally planned to be featured only in one Slayers story ("Naga's Challenge"), but a very positive response from readers turned her into the franchise's major recurring character. In 2000, she won the "Best of Dragon Magazine" popular vote in two categories, including first place for the best supporting role in the magazine's history. Writing in 1999, Dave Halverson called Lina and Naga "two of anime [medium]'s brightest stars in both Japan and the U.S." as well as "perhaps the best character designs in the anime universe". Naga has continued to be a major factor for the enduring popularity of Slayers in Japan.

Both Maria Kawamura's original Japanese voice of Naga and the English dubbing by Kelly Manison were acclaimed by anime critics, with Halverson calling Manison and Cynthia Martinez (as Lina) the best voice acting duo he has heard in 1998. Kawamura's portrayal of Naga, including her notorious cackling laughter, is considered her most famous role.

Naga is well known classic representative of manga and anime tendency for having an openly seductive enemy or rival for a virginal female protagonist. She was described as "walking fanservice" by Citlin Donovan from The Mary Sue and as "a definite favourite for almost all of male part of the audience" by Polish magazine Kawaii. Helen McCarthy wrote in 2006, "Naga and her breasts have become three very popular characters in the series, and long-term fans of the series wait eagerly to see how the writers can explain not only her disappearance between the end of Special and the beginning of the original series, but also why she is never even mentioned after the events of the videos." In 2006, Chris Beveridge of Mania.com listed the absence of Naga in the Slayers TV series as one of the ten reasons it "will always suck", stating that "besides her wonderful costume that brings about a lot of great eye-candy when it comes to cosplayers, she typified the kind of 'anime laugh' that only a precious few have. She was also the perfect foil when it came to dealing with Lina, something that the TV series never had." Crunchyroll's Nate Ming noted Naga for her "incredibly dominant, overbearing presence", and Krzysztof Wojdyło of Polish magazine Otaku placed her first of his 2012 ranking of top ten buxom characters in all manga and anime, noting that how despite her "rather dark past hidden under her constant smile and somewhat psychotic behavior", she has still remained "probably the most fun and memorable character" on that list. That same year, Anime News Network's Lynzee Loveridge also included Naga's outfit among the most impractical fighting regalia for her spaulders. In 2013, Wirtualna Polska ranked Naga's bust as the ninth most beautiful pair of breasts in pop culture.

The 2001 first edition cover of American role-playing game Ironclaw shows Lina and Naga in cameo role. The protagonists of the 2002 anime miniseries Cosplay Complex, Chako and Reika, dress up as Naga and Lina respectively in the third episode. Lina and Naga also made a cameo appearance in French comic book series Les Légendaires Origines in 2014.
