= Gourry Gabriev =

Fictional character from the Slayers franchise

- Slayers character
- Gourry in Granblue Fantasy
- First appearance: Slayers volume 1: The Slayers (1989)
- Created by: Hajime Kanzaka; Rui Araizumi
- Voiced by: Japanese Yasunori Matsumoto English Eric Stuart Chris Patton (Premium)

In-universe information
- Occupation: Mercenary, adventurer
- Relatives: Rowdy Gabriev (ancestor)

Gourry Gabriev (Japanese: ガウリイ・ガブリエフ, Hepburn: Gaurī Gaburiefu) is a fictional character from the Japanese media franchise Slayers. He is a mighty yet dimwitted mercenary swordsman who becomes a travelling companion and self-appointed guardian of the protagonist sorceress Lina Inverse. While being one of the more popular characters (along with Lina and Naga the Serpent from the prequel stories), he serves primarily as comic relief.

Gourry is portrayed as heroic, having a calm demeanor and a chivalrous attitude that serves as a foil to Lina Inverse's fiery temper tantrums and greedy disposition. He is also characterized by his lack of intelligence and his tendency to put things bluntly without any tact, occasionally hurting the feelings of others or humiliating Lina without meaning to. It has been implied his relative lack of development is due to the fact Gourry probably is not very proud of his past.

== Character ==
=== Characterization and appearances ===
Gourry's exact age is not explicitly stated in the source material, though he is generally depicted in his twenties. In the anime adaptation, he is portrayed with a noticeably younger appearance, coinciding with official guidebooks for the first and third anime seasons that list his age as 'around 22'. By contrast, the light novels suggest he may be older; in a flashback occurring three days prior to meeting Lina, Gourry encounters her father and notes that they appear to be close in age.

Gourry is the tallest of the main cast (5'11" or 182 cm according to Kanzaka) and the oldest human of the party. He is handsome and well built, with long blonde hair and blue eyes, and notorious for his poor memory and also limited intelligence. He is one of the few characters who can eat almost as much as Lina Inverse, even accounting for the fact he is much taller and structurally larger than she is.

Gourry is first seen when he finds Lina (with Naga the Serpent in Kadokawa Shoten Tsubasa's paperback edition) confronting the surviving members of the Dragon's Fangs gang (she had previously decimated most of their band, killing their leader, and took a fair chunk of their treasure for herself). Believing Lina to be "a luscious damsel in distress," Gourry steps in and defeats the bandits. When Gourry discovers that Lina is not the beautiful maiden he had thought but merely an underdeveloped teenager he is in disappointment, much to the embarrassment and humiliation of Lina (who was not even in any danger given her powers as a sorceress). Assuming that Lina is a lost little girl, he offers to escort her "home", but she plays along with his misconception and he vows to escort her there at any cost. Along the way, Gourry shifts gears into the more familiar nice guy persona that would define him for the remainder of the series.

Gourry remains Lina's closest, most consistent companion throughout the series, traveling with her even when their other two friends, Zelgadis and Amelia, are off somewhere else. Though Lina once claimed she only let him tag along because she wanted his family heirloom, the legendary Sword of Light, they continued to travel together long after the weapon was no longer in Gourry's possession, with Lina instead saying she stayed with him so she could help find him a new sword.

His relationship with Lina remains a non-romantic friendship across the light novels, manga, audio dramas, TRPG and video games. Gourry views and refers to himself primarily as her guardian; initially treating Lina like a kid, he blends comradely loyalty with a protective, sibling-like dynamic. The two have proven to be a highly effective pair in battle and can often sense what the other is thinking. In Slayers (Tsubasa Bunko edition), a version of the light-novels rewritten for younger audiences, their age difference was emphasized even further, and Naga and Sylphiel were added to the initial group to completely nip any potential romantic interpretations of their relationship in the bud. However, the anime creators chose a different direction for their relationship — a somewhat controversial framing given their age difference. Starting in the second half of the second season (Slayers NEXT), a subplot exploring potential romantic feelings between them was introduced, culminating in an unconscious kiss when Gourry rescued Lina from the Lord of Nightmares. However, both characters immediately forgot the incident, and their relationship returned to its former dynamic as if this development had never happened.

Tokyopop described Gourry as being "quite dense" and having "obtuseness"; at one point Lina states in the light novel series that he has "the strength of a troll and the brains of a jellyfish", and Tokyopop stated that this is "a more-than-astute assessment." Though his intelligence in most every day things is severely lacking, he is an incredible swordsman, performing extremely well against both regular and supernatural foes in the heat of battle. He also often shows excellent skills of observation, intuition, and is a good judge of character, though sometimes it comes a bit late to be of any good. A rather notable example of his exceptional observational skills is that he apparently figured out Xellos was not human long before anyone else did. When questioned about why he never said anything sooner about it, Gourry further dumbfounded everyone when he stated he thought it was obvious. He also noted in the novels that he was well aware that Lina was a sorceress when he first met her. While Gourry may not be the smartest of characters, his ignorance is purposefully beneficial to helping the audience understand what is going on; hence making him a device for exposition. The other three main characters are well educated and have knowledge regarding the cosmology and history of the world which is assumed everyone in the world would know. Since Gourry, however, does not know or remember these facts, it forces the other three to verbalize these facts, which allows for the audience to learn what is assumed to be well known - even the author himself admitted to be making use of this fact. In the original novels, his intelligence is portrayed more as tactless and slightly out of-the-loop rather than idiotic, as the novels are written from Lina's point of view and thus she is able to explain situations through narration rather than having to resort to Gourry's supposed faulty memory. In the novels, it is also heavily implied that Gourry tends to purposely obfuscate his intelligence most of the time to annoy or tease Lina, as well as deceive others into underestimating him.

Gourry is portrayed as an easygoing and chivalrous hero whose patient, mild-mannered disposition serves as a contrast to Lina Inverse's volatile personality. While he rarely loses his composure even in chaotic situations, his demeanor changes drastically when his allies are threatened; during a battle where he was led to believe Lina had been killed as part of a ruse, Gourry displayed intense aggression toward the perpetrator. Also, in the anime adaptation, a notable exception to his calm demeanor occurs when he is deprived of food, which frequently leads to comedic distress.

Besides the main Slayers light novel series, manga, and all of anime television series, Gourry also appears as a playable character in all of the Slayers video games and in some other media such as the film Slayers Premium. He is also featured in various assorted Slayers merchandise items such as figures, and has made guest appearances in several non-Slayers video games including Elemental Story, Granblue Fantasy, Guardian Tales, Heroes Phantasia, La Tale, Langrisser Mobile, LINE Rangers, Overlord: Mass for the Dead, Puzzle & Dragons, Tales of the Rays, Valkyrie Anatomia: The Origin, and Ragnarok M (China exclusive). In the science fiction themed series Lost Universe, Slayers creator Hajime Kanzaka's another media franchise, Lina and Gourry were mixed to create its male protagonist Kain Blueriver, complete with its version of the Sword of Light, called Psi-Blade.

=== Background ===
Very little is known about Gourry's immediate family and past, as he rarely mentions them, preferring to live in the present rather than dwell on the past. Most of his biographical details are known only through author interviews conducted for the official fan club rather than published source materials. From these accounts, it is known that he has a grandmother, a father, and a brother — the latter with whom he is reportedly on bad terms — and that his hometown is located within the Elmekian Empire. He is the descendant of the Swordsman of Light that many years ago slew the Demon Beast Zanaffar that terrorized the city of Sairaag. His family often feuded between themselves over who would become heir to the Sword of Light. It was also revealed in an interview by Kanzaka that Gourry's brother was killed as a result of the internal strife within the family. When Gourry was 17, he stole the sword and ran away from home in attempt to stop the fighting. He was a wandering mercenary for the following several years (even participating in a war), and nearly threw away the Sword of Light when he grew frustrated with the weapon. A short story "The Things That He Sees Beyond the Point of His Sword", details his inner struggle and his change of heart: When Gourry was just about to chuck the heirloom into the sea, he was stopped by a traveling fisherman, who convinces Gourry to do something worthwhile with the sword. In a strange twist of fate, it turns out this man is Lina's father, though neither Lina or Gourry are aware of this. Several days later, Gourry runs into Lina herself, and from that point on he is seldom seen without her. The only time his backstory was ever covered it did not come from his mouth nor did it take place in the present, alluding to the fact Gourry probably does not like talking about it.

The biggest areas of dispute regarding Gourry's ancestry centers around Slayers The Motion Picture. In the movie, Rowdy Gabriev is established as Gourry's ancestor - most likely his grandfather. This has led many fans to believe that the elf princess Meiroon, who Rowdy has a crush on, is Gourry's grandmother. Kanzaka has struck down this notion, saying that by the time Rowdy was old enough to marry and have children that Meiroon would have still been a child herself, so Rowdy married a human causing his grandson, Gourry, to be fully human instead of part-elf as it was commonly assumed. In a later interview, Hajime Kanzaka would reveal that the original Swordsman of Light was a woman who traveled with a male Golden Dragon, and implied that their relationship was intimate. This has led to speculation of whether Gourry is actually part-dragon.

=== Skills ===
He has displayed limited degrees of superhuman strength/stamina and a great deal of acrobatic prowess, in stark contrast to his companions who rely more on their magic while Gourry himself is not a magic user. Due to his constant exposure and sometimes being the receiving end of many spells, Gourry has developed a rather high toleration to magical attacks and damage in general. Hajime Kanzaka also revealed in an interview that Gourry possesses a magical capacity that rivals Lina's. However, he further explained that Gourry would be incapable of utilizing spells due to his inadequate memory.

While he is handy with any blunt object, Gourry's biggest contribution to a fight is his swordsmanship. Not only does Gourry reveal himself to be a nearly invincible swordsman, he is found to be the owner of the Sword of Light, also known Gorun Nova, a legendary weapon which, when not possessing a metal blade, produces a blade of pure energy, which Gourry can activate by voice. The energy blade, which functions like a lightsaber from Star Wars, can cut through almost anything and even absorb, store and then release magic spells against his enemies. When Phibrizzo released the seal on Sword of Light that withheld its full power, it was capable of firing beams of pure energy as well. His swordsmanship is downplayed as the series progresses in favor of the magic, but one occasion when he was placed under a spell and turned against his comrades he proved to be nigh unbeatable. It is explained that the Sword of Light channels and amplifies the willpower of the wielder to create the blade, which would explain his enhanced power when under mind control as his will would have been reinforced by the one controlling him. The sword was later revealed to be not a weapon of light, but a weapon more closely associated with the mazoku, specifically Dark Star Dugradigdo.

In the novels, he later procures a new sword called the Blast Sword, which absorbs the magical energies around the immediate area to sharpen the edge of its blade. It was even powerful enough to wound the astral body of the dark lord, Ruby Eye Shabranigdo. He has been shown to have moderate skills as a blacksmith, and can apparently repair his sword very quickly.

== Reception ==
Gourry Gabriev was already highly popular among readers of the Slayers light novels during the 1990s. He ranked second in the first character popularity poll in 1991 and retained second place in the second poll in 1993. In the third poll, held in 1997, he ranked fourth.

Gourry received Animage magazine's Anime Grand Prix awards for the best male hero of 1996 and 1997, placing tenth and eight respectively.

Gourry has remained popular among Slayers fans in Japan. In a 2025 character popularity poll conducted by Dengeki Online, he ranked fifth among characters from the franchise. The publication described him as an exceptionally skilled swordsman and Lina's self-appointed protector, contrasting his appearance and swordsmanship with his poor intellect. It identified the contrast between his comic absent-mindedness and his reliability as a swordsman and companion as a major part of his appeal. Several voters also praised his ability to make quick decisions in battle, support Lina emotionally, and provide a reassuring presence despite his seemingly carefree personality. Some respondents additionally noted the ambiguity of whether his apparent lack of seriousness reflects genuine simplicity or a more deliberate persona.
