= List of Slayers video games =

Slayers
- Cover art of Slayers for the PC98
- Genres: Japanese role-playing game Tactical role-playing game
- Developers: AIC Spirits; BEC; Onion Egg; TamTam
- Publishers: Banpresto; Kadokawa Shoten; ESP
- Platforms: NEC PC-9801, Super Famicom, Sega Saturn, PlayStation

The Slayers video games are single-player role-playing video game adaptations of the comic fantasy light novel, manga and anime franchise Slayers, released exclusively in Japan between 1994 and 1998. There are two different 16-bit games released in 1994 and titled simply Slayers (including one for the Super Famicom), followed by three 32-bit console games: 1997's Slayers Royal, and 1998's Slayers Royal 2 and Slayers Wonderful. The Royal series' titles are both tactical role-playing games for the 32-bit consoles.

== Role-playing games ==
=== Slayers (PC98) ===
Battle screenshot featuring a party consisting of Lina, Naga, Gourry, and one of the game's original characters

Slayers (スレイヤーズ) was developed by AIC Spirits (additional development by Oniro and Studio Orphee, graphics by Studio Kuma) and published by Banpresto for the NEC PC-9801 on March 25, 1994. It was written by Yōsuke Kuroda, art-designed by animator Masayuki Hiraoka, and composed by Shiori Ueno. In 1996, Slayers was ranked the best RPG on the system in PC Engine Fan reader poll.

==== Gameplay ====
Slayers is a first-person view dungeon crawler role-playing video game in the tradition of Wizardry, using only computer mouse controls. Its story follows the adventures of Lina Inverse and Gourry Gabriev, aided by up to two more party companions. Together, they explore the dungeons and other locations surrounding the city of Wilnan and fight enemies in random encounters and boss battles. In Wilnan, the player can rest and heal the party, swap or revive characters, and visit stores and story locations.

Additional party members include Slayers and Slayers Special light novel series characters Naga the Serpent, Zelgadiss Graywords, Amelia Wil Tesla Saillune, Philionel El Di Saillune, Lemmy Martin, and Meena, as well four original characters: Kim, Marin, Junon, and Lass. The third character slot is up for the player's choosing, but the fourth one is reserved for the story-related companions. The player directly controls only Lina and the characters do not level up.

==== Plot ====
The game begins with traveling Lina with Gourry as they are short of money left due to Lina's habit of her powerful spells inflicting way too much of collateral damage on their jobs, such as with her having just blown up an entire castle instead of just ridding of monsters. Luckily, they learn of a legend according to which a nearby city of Wilnan is the supposed location of the hidden treasure of a giant dragon. Upon reaching the city, they reunite with several of their past companions and begin investigating some areas around the city.

First, they go to some old ruins where get involved in the Chimera of the Year contest by gathering the creatures for young sorcerer Kim, and Lina ends up selling his winning chimera. Afterwards, they go to a nearby forest in the center of which stands a tower full of magic traps, where they encounter bandit girl Marin. Next, they decide to check a canyon and encounter a local girl named Junon who falls in love with Gourry and guides them to her village, which ends up destroyed when Lina's spell accidentally activates a dormant volcano during a lizardmen attack. Finally, they go to an old mine where they are joined by Lass, a mercenary girl who knows Gourry from his mercenary days, and the only survivor of a group that had found the dragon. They also come across both Kim and Marin before reaching the dragon temple, where they witness the dragon being defeated by Kim's chimera controlled by a rich merchant from the city. Lina destroys a magic crystal controlling the chimera, which goes out of control and the group manages to slay it. After the battle, Lina leaves as soon as possible, as she does not want to be blamed for everything that happened.

=== Slayers (SFC) ===
Developed by BEC and published by Banpresto for the Super Famicom (SFC) in 1994.

=== Slayers Wonderful ===
Developed by TamTam and released by Banpresto for the PlayStation in 1998.

== Tactical role-playing games ==
=== Slayers Royal ===
Developed by Onion Egg and published by Kadokawa Shoten and Entertainment Software Publishing for the Sega Saturn in 1997, and ported to the PlayStation by Japan Art Media in 1998.

=== Slayers Royal 2 ===
Developed by Onion Egg and published by Kadokawa Shoten and Entertainment Software Publishing for the Sega Saturn in 1998 and for the PlayStation in 1999.

== Crossover games ==
- Magical Battle Arena, a 2008 action doujin game featuring Lina, Naga, and the Lord of Nightmares as playable characters.
- Heroes Phantasia (sometimes written as Heroes Fantasia), a Japan-only role-playing video game developed by Banpresto and published for the PlayStation Portable by Bandai Namco Games in 2012, features the characters (both playable and non-playable) from the anime series Slayers Revolution (as well as characters from nine other anime series).
- Fantasia Re:Build, a PC and mobile game by DMM games launched in 2020.

== Guest appearances ==
- Dota & Dota 2
- Elemental Story
- Granblue Fantasy, a mobile role-playing game of which cast Lina, Naga, and Gourry joined in 2016.
- Guardian Tales, a mobile action role-playing video game featured Lina, Gourry and Xellos as playable characters.
- La Tale
- Mass for the Dead
- Puzzle & Dragons
- Ragnarok Mobile
- Tales of the Rays: Last Cradle, an RPG mobile game that featured Lina, Gourry, Zelgadis, and Amelia as playable characters with Xellos as a boss character as well as a costume for Reid Hershel (Tales of Eternia). Before she herself was added to the game in another collaboration event, Naga first appeared as a costume for Natalia Luzu Kimlasca-Lanvaldear (Tales of the Abyss). A playable Naga and an enemy boss Xellos were later featured in a second Slayers event.
- Valkyrie Anatomia: The Origin featured Lina and Naga as playable characters in a 2018 collaboration event.
- Langrisser Mobile

== See also ==
- List of video games based on anime or manga
