= Slayers Return =

1996 Japanese anime film directed by Hiroshi Watanabe Kunihiko Yuyama

- Poster art
- Directed by: Hiroshi Watanabe
- Screenplay by: Hajime Kanzaka
- Based on: Slayers by Hajime Kanzaka; Rui Araizumi
- Produced by: Kiminobu Sato
- Starring: Megumi Hayashibara; Maria Kawamura; Akiko Hiramatsu; Kenji Utsumi; Kazuki Yao
- Music by: Takayuki Hattori
- Production company: J.C.Staff
- Distributed by: Toei Company
- Release date: August 3, 1996
- Running time: 61 minutes
- Country: Japan
- Language: Japanese

Slayers Return (Japanese: スレイヤーズ RETURN, Hepburn: Sureiyāzu Ritān), also known as Slayers Movie 2 - The Return, is a 1996 Japanese comic fantasy anime film written by Hajime Kanzaka and directed by Kunihiko Yuyama and Hiroshi Watanabe. It is the second film released in the Slayers saga and a sequel to 1995's Slayers Perfect that was itself followed by Slayers Great in 1997.

In Slayers Return, the mercenary heroines Lina Inverse and Naga the Serpent are hired to rescue a village girl from an evil wizard who is searching there for a legendary treasure that might be an invincible magical weapon instrumental for his plan of world domination. The film was met with a positive reception and was also adapted into a manga version by Kanzaka and Shoko Yoshinaka.

== Plot ==
Young sorceresses Lina Inverse and Naga the Serpent travel across the world in search of adventure and money, bickering with each other along the way. They meet a girl named Saleena, who seems to be a random victim of the result of their petty food fight that ended with a powerful spell explosion. The truth is she has been already injured since when she escaped from her village of Biaz, where the evil organization Zein enslaved the population. The usually selfish Lina inexplicably agrees to help them: she has heard about an ancient elven treasure made of the nearly indestructible magical metal of orihalcon and she would like to put her hands on it. Because of Lina's suspicious behavior, the equally greedy Naga decides to follow them.

Once in Biaz, the two ask for a reward for saving it but the village chief and Saleena's father are not able to give them a reward high enough, so Naga takes and puts on an orihalcon bracelet she finds there. Lina and Naga embark to defeat the Zein megalomaniac leader Galev and discover is a fluke as his wizard powers are mostly a bluff, and his organization currently consists of just himself and his sole underling Zahhard. The girls and Saleena confront Galev's arriving collection of henchmen but they want to get Galev themselves because he did not pay their promised salary. Turns out that Galev planned to take hold of a long-lost legendary superweapon that find out about in an old magic book and if he was able to take possession of it, conquer and rule to world.

When the weapon is unearthed, what Lina thought would be immense treasure turns out to be a massive golem made whole of orihalcon. Naga's bracelet is its control device but she can not either control it properly or take it off. The golem attacks them all and a chase and running battle begins, in which everyone joins the forces to defeat the golem and the mini-golems it spawns. To solve destroy the crazed golem, Lina asks Naga to create one of her golems and surround it with a barrier, so Lina can cast a destructive Dragon Slave spell and send the second golem right against the first, finally defeating it but ruining all the orihalcon. The film ends with the girls and Biaz's people running after Galev, because not only did he take money from them and spend it on useless fancy costumes for his organization, but now it was also impossible for the chief to pay Lina and Naga.

== Cast ==
Character	Japanese voice actor	English voice actor
Lina Inverse	Megumi Hayashibara	Cynthia Martinez
Naga the Serpent	Maria Kawamura	Kelly Manison
Galev	Kenji Utsumi	Jason Douglas
Zahhard	Kazuki Yao	Kurt Stoll
Saleena	Akiko Hiramatsu	Nora Stein
Becker	Chafurin	David Born
Warrior	Daisuke Gori	Jason Konopisos
Amazon	Maya Okamoto	Luci Christian
Sorcerer	Minoru Inaba	Marty Fleck
Saleena's father	Akio Ōtsuka	Mike Kleinhenz

== Release ==
Slayers Return was originally released theatrically in Japan on August 3, 1996, distributed by Toei Animation and screened in as a double feature with the film version of X. Bandai Visual's home version was released on the VHS and LaserDisc in April 1997, and re-released on the DVD as part of the EMOTION the Best Slayers Movie Edition DVD-BOX (EMOTION the Best スレイヤーズ 劇場版 DVD-BOX) collection of all Slayers films in 2010. It was included in the collection of digitally remastered Slayers films and OAV series, released on Blu-ray in Japan on October 30, 2015.

The film was released by ADV Films on the DVD in North America in 2003 as Slayers Movie 2 - The Return; ADV also acquired distribution rights for it in the UK. Return was later released by ADV with the other four Slayers movies in a "Movie" boxset, and with the other four movies and both OVA series in a "Movies and OVAs" box set.

The English dubbing version was written by Dan Kanemitsu and directed and produced by Sandra Krasa. The film was also broadcast in the English version by ADV's Anime Network, and was released in Australia and New Zealand by Madman Entertainment, in France by Déclic Images, in Italy by Yamato Video (dubbed to Italian by DEA Digital Editing Audio), and in Germany by ACOG and OVA Films (dubbed to German by Circle of Arts).

=== Books ===
A companion guide book was published by Fujimi Shobō in the Dragon Magazine Collection in August 1996 (released also in the low-budget "miniartbook" version), followed by Slayers Return Anime Comic in November 1996. The scripts for Return, Great and Gorgeous were published in the book Slayers Original.

The film's 1997 manga adaptation Slayers RETURN hen (スレイヤーズ RETURN 編, Sureiyāzu ritān hen) was written by Hajime Kanzaka and illustrated by Shoko Yoshinaka. It is the fourth volume of the main Slayers series, although it represents a break in the continuity of the story. It was published in North America by Central Park Media on February 4, 2004.

=== Soundtrack ===
Slayers Return: Motion Picture R

Soundtrack album by Takayuki Hattori
- Released: August 28, 1996 (Japan); November 19, 2002 (North America)
- Recorded: 1996
- Genres: Orchestral, J-pop
- Labels: King Records (Japan); ADV Films (North America)

The original soundtrack Slayers Return: Motion Picture R (KICA-314) was originally released on CD in Japan by King Records on August 28, 1996. It was later released in North America by ADV Films on November 19, 2002 (B00007BH7R).

The soundtrack contains all of the film's background music (BGM) composed by Takayuki Hattori, the ending song (as well as its special version called "Movie Size Version"), and two characters songs ("image songs") along with a special version of one of them (called "Fireball Groove Mix") and a karaoke version of the other. All vocalized songs were performed by Megumi Hayashibara and Maria Kawamura.

The film's theme song "Just Be Conscious" was released as a single CD (KIDA-136) by Starchild Records on July 5, 1996. Both "Just Be Conscious" and "Run All the Way!" were featured in Hayashibara's 1997 album Irāvatī. The songs from the film were also later included in the CD collection The Best of Slayers Vol. 2 (From OVA, Movie & Game).

== Reception ==
The film was well received by most Western anime critics, including a score of 79% from Patrick King of Animefringe. Dani Moure of Mania.com gave this "hilarious little movie with endearing characters" a B+ and positively compared it to the first Slayers film, writing that Return, despite a shorter run time than its predecessor, is "still immensely enjoyable, and actually manages to be a complete story that doesn't totally alienate those who have no prior experience with the series." Mania.com's Chris Beveridge too praised the film, especially for how it "tells a fun little tale with a fair number of quirky twists and physical comedy that it has something that would make just about anyone laugh," also giving it a B+ and declaring it "definitely a keeper." Zac Bertschy of Anime News Network recommended it as a classic of its era, stating, "anime was somehow different back in the mid-1990s, and Slayers Return is a perfect time capsule back to those days. Don't miss it." Anime News Network's Daryl Surat retrospectively included it among the best anime of 1996, also noting it as his favourite Slayers film.

According to The Digital Fix, "if you've seen any of the other Slayers films/OVAs, you'll know what to expect from Slayers Return; it's certainly an enjoyable way to spend an hour (and doubly so if you prefer the solitary Lina/Naga vibe to the party dynamic found in the TV series);" the film received a score of 7/10. Animetion gave it four stars out of five, opining that "if you want serious and meaningful fantasy check out Escaflowne, but if you want love-struck golems, disenfranchised henchmen, villains with delusions of grandeur, plenty of pointless explosions and a good laugh then Slayers Return is just what you're looking for." Polish fantasy writer Aleksandra Janusz, writing for the magazine Kawaii, noted the film to be funnier than its predecessor, which she called "a very good movie". In a relatively rare dissenting review, Mania.com's Megan Lavey gave Return a score of C, calling it "the weakest movie out of the [Slayers films], simply because the plot is not memorable and even Lina and Naga aren't very funny themselves in it, especially when compared to Great."
