= Magical Circle Guru Guru =

Japanese manga series

- Cover of the first DVD Box featuring main protagonists Kukuri and Nike

魔法陣グルグル (Mahōjin Guru Guru)
- Genre: Fantasy comedy
- Manga
- Written by: Hiroyuki Etō
- Published by: Enix
- Magazine: Monthly Shōnen Gangan
- Original run: July 11, 1992 – August 12, 2003
- Volumes: 16
- Anime television series
- Directed by: Nobuaki Nakanishi
- Produced by: Masakazu Ida (ABC); Nobuaki Tanaka
- Music by: Nobuyuki Nakamura
- Studio: Nippon Animation
- Original network: ANN (ABC, TV Asahi)
- Original run: October 13, 1994 – September 14, 1995
- Episodes: 45
- Anime film
- Directed by: Nobuaki Nakanishi
- Produced by: Nobuaki Tanaka
- Written by: Hideki Mitsui
- Music by: Nobuyuki Nakamura
- Studio: Nippon Animation
- Released: April 20, 1996
- Runtime: 30 minutes
- Anime television series

Doki Doki Densetsu Mahōjin Guru Guru
- Directed by: Jun Takagi
- Produced by: Fukashi Azuma; Shinjirō Nakayama; Shigeo Endō
- Written by: Hideki Mitsui
- Music by: Nobuyuki Nakamura
- Studio: Nippon Animation
- Original network: TXN (TV Tokyo)
- Original run: April 4, 2000 – December 26, 2000
- Episodes: 38
- Manga

Mahoujin Guru Guru 2
- Written by: Hiroyuki Etō
- Published by: Square Enix
- Magazine: Gangan Online
- Original run: November 1, 2012 – July 17, 2025
- Volumes: 21
- Anime television series
- Directed by: Hiroshi Ikehata
- Written by: Hisaaki Okui
- Music by: TECHNOBOYS PULCRAFT GREEN-FUND
- Studio: Production I.G
- Licensed by: Crunchyroll
- Original network: TXN (TV Tokyo), AT-X
- Original run: July 11, 2017 – December 19, 2017
- Episodes: 24

Magical Circle Guru Guru (Japanese: 魔法陣グルグル, romanized: Mahōjin Guru Guru) is a Japanese manga by Hiroyuki Etō, which was serialized in Enix's Monthly Shōnen Gangan from 1992 to 2003. It was later adapted into an anime series by Nippon Animation from October 1994 to September 1995. A short film was released in 1996. A sequel series aired from April to December 2000. A second manga series was serialized in Gangan Online from 2012 to 2025. A new series based on the manga animated by Production I.G aired from July to December 2017. Crunchyroll streamed the anime, marking the first anime from the Mahoujin Guru Guru franchise to receive an official English release.

Mahōjin Guru Guru is a light series aimed at older children. It contains occasional toilet gags and some innuendo. It also is a parody of early role-playing video games (RPGs), particularly turn-based games, such as those in the Dragon Quest series. Information boxes are often displayed on screen with accompanying narration in the traditional RPG style. The overall goal of the two main characters, Nike and Kukuri, is to defeat Giri, the ruler of the darkness. Since the anime is based on an RPG, several side quests need to be completed before they are able to locate him.

== Characters ==
=== Main characters ===
Nike (ニケ)

Voiced by: Fujiko Takimoto (1994-1996), Omi Minami (2000), Shizuka Ishigami (2017)

Nike (pronounced Nee-kay) is the protagonist. Because of this, Nike is a competent but cowardly fighter. Like Kukuri, he is initially immature and inexperienced. Nike is from Jimina Mura, (which translates to Plain Old Village). Initially, Nike wants to be a Wizard as he finds the thought of casting a fireball "cool", though his parents convince him to be the Hero. He initially thinks that he is of the Hero class, as do others. It is later revealed that he is a Thief. Despite this, he can use all the abilities of the Hero class, including Cool Pose, which only a Hero can do.

Bado (バド)

Voiced by: Hiroshi Masuoka (1994-96)

Bado is Nike's father. He had always wished to be a Hero, but due to the lack of any great evil to fight against, he had to give up on his dream. However, he made his son undergo hard training as a child in hopes that one day a great evil would arise and Nike could fight it. He received a critical hit in the form of a punch the first time he held the infant Nike. After that, he trained Nike to be a Hero. Right before he departs for Kodai Castle, Nike offers him his old helmet. The helmet is cracked, but Nike suggests he will wear it by tilting it to the side. Bado kicks Nike into the air and keeps the helmet on, saying that he looks like a gang leader.

Rena (レナ) is Nike's mother. She knocks out Nike with a poison dart when he tries to flee. She cooks him a meal that resembles an adventuring map. Nike has to eat things in the proper order, which he does not, and ends up poisoned.

Kukuri (ククリ)
Voiced by: Konami Yoshida (1994-2000), Konomi Kohara (2017)

Kukuri is a gentle-hearted magic apprentice. She had grown under the care of Jimuna Town's old witch, who received her as a baby from a wandering stranger, supposedly the last member of the Migu Migu Tribe. Being the last remaining member of the Migu Migu, Kukuri learns the dark summoning magic only the Migu Migu can use, known as Guru Guru; it consists of drawing magic circles on the ground with a staff. She is eager and shows great affection towards Nike, almost always calling him "Mr. Hero" (Yusha in Japanese). She is extremely lucky or good in several sports and games, such as rock-paper-scissors and cricket. She becomes furious when someone says anything about her appearance. At the end of the series, it's revealed that Guru Guru is actually the magic of a young maiden in love, so she'll lose this ability when she grows up.

Old Witch is an old woman who raised Kukuri. She is called obaba (old hag) and cow by Kukuri. She lied to Kukuri that chocolate is poison to children to keep her from eating hers.

=== Rivals ===
Ena is a beautiful Wizard who is in love with Gail. She is dressed like a belly dancer.

Gaile is a Fighter that thinks he is a Hero. Despite Gail's high level, he loses most battles, even the one with Nike the first time they met. Gail and Ena reveal that they usually do not have enough money to buy food as they use it to buy equipment; it is they reason they lose all the time.

=== Others ===
Kita Kita Oyaji

Voiced by Kenichi Ogata (1994–2000), Katsuyuki Konishi (2017)

Oyaji (real name Udberg Eldol), or "Old Man", used to be the mayor of Kitano, also called North Town. When the town's traditional dance Kita Kita could no longer be performed because no more girls were born, he started dancing it himself. He believes that as a result of a curse, they had commercialized the dance. His dance is often regarded as creepy and disgusting by the other characters. He usually follows the duo of Nike and Kukuri around. He wears a hula dress and usually finds some excuse to perform his Kita Kita dance, much to the duo's dismay. In "Doki Doki Legend," it is learned he accidentally developed muscles from all the dancing and is able to defeat monsters in one punch. He has 1650 Hit Points in "Pickle of Happiness" that make him nearly immortal and able to sustain extreme levels of abuse that is inflicted upon him all the time.

Toma

Voiced by Yukiyo Fujii (2017)

He joins the party and meets Nike and Kukuri in North village where he pretends to be of the Priest class. In "Doki Doki Legend" he plays a major role in Nike's party as a Magical engineer with the ability to invent magical items. He is shown to be level 12 when Nike and Kukuri were 2 and 3 respectively. Toma was interested in Migu.

Migu's first encounter with Nike and Kukuri was in North Village, where she put on a front as a martial artist at the party they were attending .She tries to use sex appeal against the ratman guard at the dungeon of Mountain Saw-edge but the ratman flees as she scares him. She is Zaza's sister.

Zaza joins the party and meets Nike and Kukuri in north village where he pretends to be a wizard. Zaza was interested in Kukuri. He is Migu's brother.

Juju

Voiced by Yuri Amano (Season 1 and Movie), Kae Araki (Season 2) (1994), Yō Taichi (2017)

She is a Priestess of the Purato people. In "Doki Doki Legend" she joins Nike's party as a warrior priest. Her magic comes from praying to Purato's God. She proves to be a good exorcist. She appears very powerful but is impeded in her spell casting as seen when her combat Altar was broken by Gochinko's sword style.

Gochinko

Voiced by Rikiya Koyama (2017)

He is a sword trainer and master of 'stupid' or 'queer' swordsmanship. This unique form of sword-fighting, which he teaches wearing a rundown small hall, specializes in making the enemy laugh to distract his attention. Gochinko places flowers on parts of his body and takes strange stances to make the enemy laugh and thus inflicts great damage as he is distracted. He tries to teach Nike swordsmanship and judges that Nike is very bad at it. He is a Purato agent and serves JuJu.

Gipple

Voiced by Urara Takano (1994), Takahiro Sakurai (2017)

He is a small wind spirit who occasionally guides the duo, though he vanishes at the first sign of trouble. He can expand his cloak into a tent and store items in it. Gipple has an anthropomorphic body under the cloak and wears fundoshi. Gipple seems disgusted by any emotional or dramatic demonstration and expresses this whenever possible.

Lunlun Felmère

Voiced by Naoko Matsui (1994), Saori Ōnishi (2017)

She is a woman from a magic society who helps Nike and Kukuri from time to time. She uses snake magic and is the one who gave Gipple to Nike. In "Doki Doki Legend" she falls in love with Nike's Thief mentor Sly. Nike cannot help laughing when he hears her name and hides behind a rock to avoid being noticed.

King Uruga XIII

Voiced by Atsushi Ono

He resides in Kodai castle. He is a short man with a long mustache and long black hair. He gives 800 Rin to Nike and Kukuri to aid their quest in defeating Giri.

Guriel is a blonde fairy with a pink tutu and a ribbon on her head. She knew the secret weak point of Kisegi Gold and was imprisoned when she told about a hundred of her friends. After she was freed, she left famous rice crackers as a gift. Fairy Elder, No idea/nothingness faeries and Confusion faeries are others in the story.

Beegain is a sage, who teaches Nike about Light magic and the Kira Kira sword.

Wugenvillia is found in Potoma Academy in the Potoma kingdom.

SteinWetts is also called Wetts.

Ardenberg and Wanchin

=== Monsters ===
Lord Giri

Voiced by: Ryūzaburō Ōtomo

Giri is the series' main antagonist. After having been sealed by Guruguru magic for 300 years during the reign of King Uruga III, he returned and unleashed his army of monsters to take over the world. Since his only weakness is Guruguru magic, he tries to destroy Kukuri, the last Guruguru user in existence. He is always depicted sitting on a big armchair, completely hidden in a dark cloak with only his red eyes glowing through. In his demonic-looking hand he always holds a glass of wine.

Raid

Voiced by: Nobuhiko Okamoto (2017)

He is a handsome demon-prince who is fond of Kukuri. His special name for her is "Pink Bomb," and he continually tries to split her away from Nike to fall in love with him. His magic attacks are powerful, but often involve complicated incantations and unusual results, such as gastric distress.

Ratmen are very low-ranked type of monsters. They sometimes speak in Prose. They have 3 HP.

Rai Rai is a flying monster that resembles a bird.

Kisegi is a monster that fights with a club or a spear, has three horns on his head and adds -sss after every sentence. He is somehow related to cats, as he is extremely affected by catnip. He has 5 HP.

Kisegi Gold is a Kisegi and boss of the dungeon at Mountain Saw-edge. His weak point is to the right of the scale below the crest between the two horns on the back of his shoulders. He appears stupid and has Ratmen write his lines. He can breathe fire, inflict double damage when enraged, and is part salamander. He usually fights with a huge sword.

Man-eating plant is found in a room in the dungeon of Mountain Saw-Edge.

NG is a blue monster sorcerer in a death pool.

Chikuri Demon is a teammate with Search Eye and will tell lies to her enemies to cause division until they attack each other. She loves to talk and often unwittingly reveals the plans of Giri.

Search Eye will scan his opponent for weaknesses then produce an illusion to lower his or her guard. At this point Chikuri will join the attack.

Mandoragora is a monster with a gourd shaped watermelon for a head and tree branches for legs and arms. Its torso is covered in leaves. The top of its head opens up to reveal stems and red petals. This monster was always unlucky with girls, so he terrorized their village and demanded girls, who he made go through hard labor. Mandoragora can shield himself with his leaves and gain protection from fire. His main attack is Black pepper spores that launch from his head. His stems can be used as limbs or whips and his hands as claws.

Yanban is a red man-like dog with intense eyebrows wearing a grey cloak. It is located in great numbers in the fairy village mountain and fights with a woodsman axe which it sometimes throws. It also wears a hat with several white feathers on top and white sandals. Its bite is venomous and deadly. The Yanban can also play with his target and lick his targets which makes them disgusted.

Lovelovella is a heart-shaped creature with long hair. Her large sparkling eyes cause her opponents to laugh, so she can use her hair to smack them while their guard is down.

Vacuum sucks in the surrounding area until its enemies are consumed. As he sucks in air, he expands larger and larger. He seems to be easily punctured.

Gizaier, Darklings, and Dora Dora are other monsters.

== Media ==
=== First anime series ===
The first series Mahoujin Guru Guru (produced by Nippon Animation) has 45 episodes. It covers the content of manga volumes 1 - 4 and some other adventures not in the manga.

After being sealed for 300 years, the demon lord Giri reawakens and sends off his monster minions to wreak havoc in the world. King Uruga XIII thus, decides to place announcements everywhere in the kingdom in search of a legendary hero who can defeat Giri. In the king's castle a competition will be held to discover who the true hero is. Forced by his parents to go to the castle, Nike first visits the witch's house, where Kukuri joins him. Together they travel around the world defeating monsters, gaining new abilities, trying to uncover the mysteries surrounding the Migu Migu tribe and making many friends while confronting enemies.

Opening Themes
#	Transcription/Translation	Performed by	Episodes
1	Magic of Love	TOo'S	1-31
2	Harete Hallelujah	Okui Aki	32-45

Ending themes
#	Transcription/Translation	Performed by	Episodes
1	Wind Climbing ~ Kaze ni Asobarete	Okui Aki	1-26
2	Mou Tomaranai	Slap Sticks	27-45

=== Movie ===
In the movie, Nike and Kukuri learn about the "Pickle of Happiness", an item which will grant a wish to the one who eats it. With the help of old friends, they must beat the monsters to the Pickle and convince its guardian residing in Megalo mountain, the Megalo dragon to give it to them.

Opening Themes
#	Transcription/Translation	Performed by	Episodes
	Kin no Tobira	Satomi Kihara with Radio Heart	All

Ending themes
#	Transcription/Translation	Performed by	Episodes
	Love Goes	HIM	All

=== Doki Doki Legend ===
The second anime series was created in 2000, six years after the original. It covers the contents of manga volumes 5 to 11 (there are 16 manga volumes in total).

Nike and Kukuri receive a message from Wanchin, the old leader of the Migu Migu, who tells them they need to find the 4 elemental swords in order to defeat Giri. Thus, a new adventure starts.

At the end of the manga Nike and Kukuri seal Giri, though this is not shown in the animation.

Opening Themes
#	Transcription/Translation	Performed by	Episodes
	Dynamite Heaven	2Shy4U	All

Ending themes
#	Transcription/Translation	Performed by	Episodes
1	Nishi no Sora e	Spoon	1-25
2	Enjoy the party	R'OSE	26-38

=== Reboot series ===
A third series was announced in January 2017 and adapts the manga from the first chapter. It was animated by Production I.G and aired from July 11 to December 19, 2017, consisting of 24 episodes. Hiroshi Ikehata directed the anime, with Hisaaki Okui handled the series composition and Naoyuki Asano designed the characters. ORESAMA performed the first opening theme "Trip Trip Trip" and TECHNOBOYS PULCRAFT GREEN-FUND is composing the music and performed the ending theme "Round & Round & Round" alongside Bonjour Suzuki. ORESAMA also performed the second opening theme "Ryuusei Dance Floor". TECHNOBOYS PULCRAFT GREEN-FUND also performed the second ending theme "Magical Circle" alongside Shoko Nakagawa.

=== Games ===
Published by Enix,

- Mahōjin Guru Guru (SNES)
  - Mahōjin Guru Guru (Game Boy), published by Takara
- Mahōjin Guru Guru 2 (SNES)
- Doki Doki Densetsu Mahōjin Guru Guru (Game Boy Color)
- Magical Battle Arena (crossover video game, Microsoft Windows)

Magical Circle Guru-Guru: Stardust Adventure, the first Magical Circle Guru-Guru browser game is scheduled to launch on the G123 platform by CTW Inc. in 2023.

== Reception ==
Since 1992, the manga has printed over 14 million copies in Japan.

== See also ==
- Akazukin Chacha
- List of Square Enix manga franchises
