= Hiroshi Watanabe (animator) =

Japanese anime director and animator

- Born: Kumamoto, Japan
- Occupations: Animator, storyboard artist, director
- Years active: 1978-present

Hiroshi Watanabe (わたなべひろし, Watanabe Hiroshi) is a Japanese animator, storyboard artist, and director.

== Anime involved in ==
- Cookin' Idol I! My! Mine!: Director
- Elfen Lied: 2nd Key Animation, Key Animation (ep 10)
- Fantastic Detective Labyrinth: Director, Storyboard, Episode Director, Key Animation
- Fist of the North Star (1986 film): Key Animation
- Gekijōban Meiji Tokyo Renka: Yumihari no Serenade: Director
- Guyver: Out of Control: Director, Key Animation
- Hell Girl: Storyboard (ep. 24), Draft Proposal
- Hell Girl: Two Mirrors: Original Script, Storyboard (eps. 4, 10), Episode Director (ep. 10)
- Hell Girl: Three Vessels: Director, Storyboard (ep 1), Episode Director (eps 1, 26), Original Concept
- Hetalia The Beautiful World: Director, Storyboard (episodes 5, 15), Episode Director (episodes 5, 15)
- Hetalia The World Twinkle: Director
- If I See You in My Dreams (OVA): Director, Character Design
- If I See You in My Dreams (TV): Supervision
- Jing: King of Bandits: Director, Storyboard
- Jing, King of Bandits: Seventh Heaven: Director, Storyboard
- Magical Princess Minky Momo: Character Design
- Meganebu!: Assistant Director
- Nameko: Sekai no Tomodachi: Director
- Samurai Champloo: In-Between Animation (Triple A; episodes 11–12, 26)
- Shining Tears X Wind: Director
- Slayers Excellent: Director
- Slayers Gorgeous: Director, Storyboard
- Slayers Great: Director, Key Animation
- Slayers Return: Director, Key Animation
- Slayers Special (OVA): Director
- Slayers The Motion Picture: Director
- Sorcerous Stabber Orphen: Series Director, Storyboard (episode 15)
- Star Ocean EX: Director, Storyboard, Key Animation
- Tactics: Director, Storyboard, Episode Director
- The Law of Ueki: Director, Unit Director (Opening)
- The Mythical Detective Loki Ragnarok: Director, Storyboard (Opening; episode 1), Episode Director (episode 1)
- Tying the Knot with an Amagami Sister: Assistant Director
- Xuan Yuan Sword Luminary:Director, Storyboard (OP, ED; eps. 1–2), Unit Director (OP, ED; eps. 1, 13), Animation Director (eps. 10, 13), Art design, 2nd Key Animation (ep. 13), Key Animation (OP; eps. 8, 10, 13)
