= Slayers Premium =

2001 Japanese anime film directed by Junichi Sato

- Poster art
- Directed by: Junichi Satō
- Screenplay by: Junichi Satō
- Based on: Slayers by Hajime Kanzaka; Rui Araizumi
- Produced by: Kōji Asano; Seiichi Hachiya; Tomoko Kawasaki
- Music by: Takayuki Hattori
- Production company: Hal Film Maker
- Distributed by: Toei Company
- Release date: December 22, 2001
- Running time: 30 minutes
- Country: Japan
- Language: Japanese

Slayers Premium (Japanese: スレイヤーズぷれみあむ, Hepburn: Sureiyāzu Puremiamu) is a 2001 Japanese anime short film written and directed by Junichi Satō. Premium, the fifth and latest Slayers film, was first released in Japan on December 22, 2001, along with Sakura Wars: The Movie, Di Gi Charat - A Trip to the Planet and Azumanga Daioh: The Animation.

This is the only Slayers movie so far to feature the characters of Gourry Gabriev, Amelia Wil Tesla Seyruun, Zelgadis Greywords and Xellos. Naga the Serpent also has a small role, as "the octopus sorceress".

== Plot ==
Lina and Gourry travel to the town of Acassi, known for its tasty octopus. However, the octopus meat is cursed, causing the person who eats it to only be able to speak takogo (タコ語, octopus language). Sorcerers and sorceresses cursed by this also cannot cast spells, since the spells have to be spoken in a common language in order for them to work.

Gourry just happens to eat one of the cursed octopuses (after fighting for it with Lina), which causes him to speak in takogo. This often creates awkward situations during the film (the phrase "how horrible" being spoken as "flat chested", which offends Lina greatly). But soon, everyone in town starts to speak takogo (including Amelia and Zelgadis, who had just arrived in town), despite the fact that they have not eaten any octopus. Xellos is also there, seeming to know some details about what is going on but is not divulging anything.

It soon becomes evident that the octopuses plan to use the accumulated anger from the villagers of Acassi to release a demon that was sealed many years before. Lina and her friends have to stop these plans before they come to fruition. However, it becomes complicated when Lina is infected with the takogo affliction, which negates much of her magic, including the Dragon Slave, her signature move.

== Cast ==
Character	Japanese voice actor	English voice actor
Lina Inverse	Megumi Hayashibara	Cynthia Martinez
Gourry Gabriev	Yasunori Matsumoto	Christopher Patton
Xellos	Akira Ishida	Kurt Stoll
Zelgadis Greywords	Hikaru Midorikawa	Crispin Freeman
Amelia Wil Tesla Seyruun	Masami Suzuki	Luci Christian
Naga the Serpent	Maria Kawamura	Kelly Manison
Ruma	Yuri Shiratori	Kira Vincent-Davis
Intelligent octopus	Takahiro Sakurai	Todd Postlethwaite (credited as T.J.P.)
Master	Isamu Tanonaka	Jason Douglas
Tavern owner	Ichie Seta	John Swasey
Guardian deity	Goro Naya	James Faulkner

== Release ==
Slayers Premium was originally released in Japan on December 22, 2001. It was licensed by ADV Films and released with English dubbing on DVD on January 17, 2005. It was later included in the collection of digitally remastered Slayers films and OAV series, released on Blu-ray in Japan on October 30, 2015.

== Reception ==
Aleksandra Janusz of the Polish magazine Kawaii expressed her severe disappointment in Slayers Premium for several reasons, including its short running time, character design and animation changes, the plot that in her opinion was weak with unfunny gags, and deeming returning characters other than Lina and Gourry unnecessary due to their unsatisfactory very small roles in the film. In his review for Anime News Network, Zac Bertschy conversely called it "an entertaining little piece of fan-pleasing animation."
