= Slayers Great =

1997 Japanese anime film

- Theatrical release poster
- Directed by: Hiroshi Watanabe
- Screenplay by: Hajime Kanzaka
- Based on: Slayers by Hajime Kanzaka; Rui Araizumi
- Produced by: Kiminobu Sato
- Starring: Maria Kawamura; Megumi Hayashibara; Kikuko Inoue; Seizō Katō; Takehito Koyasu
- Music by: Takayuki Hattori
- Production company: J.C.Staff
- Distributed by: Toei Company
- Release date: August 2, 1997
- Running time: 64 minutes
- Country: Japan
- Language: Japanese

Slayers Great (Japanese: スレイヤーズ ぐれえと, Hepburn: Sureiyāzu Gurēto) is a 1997 Japanese anime film written by Hajime Kanzaka and directed by Hiroshi Watanabe. It was the third film released in the Slayers saga and was met with a generally positive reception from Western critics. Great was followed by Slayers Gorgeous in 1997.

In the film, protagonist sorceresses Lina Inverse and Naga the Serpent arrive at a town where the art of golem-making is highly prized and become involved in the rivalry between a father and son with very different ideas on how golems should be made. When two opposing lords seek the aid of the men against each other, Lina and Naga find themselves the central attractions in a festive duel of massive golems powered by their magic.

== Plot ==
Two companion sorceresses and on-and-off adversaries, the overpowered Lina Inverse and the underdressed Naga the Serpent, wander into the town of Stoner, famous of its entertainment golem makers. There they rescue a young girl named Laia Einberg from an out-of-control golem. Lina and Naga expect to be rewarded for their not-so selfless deed, so Laia takes them to her workplace and introduces them to her father, Galia, and her brother, Huey. Galia is a renowned crafter of classic toy golems but lately he is struggling for money. He is also in conflict with Huey, his son and student, over their very opposing ideas as to how their golems should look and act like. Huey becomes infatuated with Naga's looks, while Galia takes a liking to Lina, and so they choose both sorceresses as models for their respective new golems.

There is an upcoming event in Stoner in which huge, remote-controlled golems will fight each other in a competition. The same contest will also decide which of two feuding lords sponsoring the festival, Haizen and Granion, will take control over the town. Secretly, both of the lords also scheme to have their golems mass-produced as unstoppable weapons of war. Haizen succeeds in hiring Huey and Naga, while Galia and Lina get employed by Granion. Lina and Naga can easily become antagonistic, and, following an inconclusive magical duel, they end up battling it out again – but this time they are going to fight through the golems made in their appearance.

Due to Galia lacking magical clay due to Huey's sabotage, his golem is built with the sleeping Lina trapped inside so she would use her own magic to power it at the tournament. Huey has lured Naga into his golem and so now there is a powerful sorceress in each. To Lina's dismay, and Granion's disappointment, the golem that was made in her image is a super deformed giant kawaii toy with funny squeaky shoes, dubbed "Piko-Piko Lina-chan" (called Lina Doll in the dub) – instead of finding her beautiful as she believed, Galia thought she was "a girl with no hips or breasts, with a face just screaming to be characterized." She is irked even more to see Huey's towering "Grand Goddess" golem that resembles Naga to the point of also having bouncing breasts (with the well-endowed Naga's breasts being an object of burning envy for Lina).

Their battle begins, but Piko-Piko Lina-chan's short limbs can not even hit the Grand Goddess while Naga just plays with her. Further enraged, Lina attempts to attack with magic, but the golem's magical properties absorb magic, making Lina's spells useless. During that completely one-sided fight, one physical attack by the Grand Goddess makes a large hole in the back of Lina's golem. The furious Lina gets free and unleashes her most powerful spell, Dragu Slave, to defeat the Grand Goddess. Lina wins, but her spell has also destroyed the castles of both Haizen and Granion. Lina flees the suddenly outraged Naga and both of them get pursued by the angry lords manning the Piko-Piko Lina-chan, which soon stops when it runs out of power.

During the film's closing credits, the ex-lords Haizen and Granion find themselves reduced to the guards for the king of the land. Galia and Huey resolve their differences, deciding to start making toys that are to be both cute and sexy at the same time, while the now derelict Piko-Piko Lina-chan becomes the new symbol and mascot of the entire town. Elsewhere, Lina and Naga continue their travels together, as prone to failing-out with each other as ever.

== Cast ==
Character	Japanese voice actor	English voice actor
Lina Inverse	Megumi Hayashibara	Cynthia Martinez
Naga the Serpent	Maria Kawamura	Kelly Manison
Huey	Takehito Koyasu	Andy McAvin
Galia	Seizō Katō	John Tyson
Laia	Kikuko Inoue	Hilary Haag
Lord Haizen	Kiyoshi Kawakubo	Ted Pfister
Lord Granion	Norio Wakamoto	Todd James
Sorcerer	Shigezou Sasaoka	Wendel Calvert
Granion's aide	Minoru Inaba	Rick Piersall
Referee	Kazuhiko Kishino	George Manley

== Release ==
Slayers Great was theatrically released in Japan on August 2, 1997, distributed by Toei Animation and screened as a double feature along with Tenchi the Movie 2: The Daughter of Darkness. Bandai Visual's home version was released on the VHS and LaserDisc in April 1997, and re-released on the DVD as part of the EMOTION the Best Slayers Movie Edition DVD-BOX (EMOTION the Best スレイヤーズ 劇場版 DVD-BOX) collection of all Slayers films in 2010. It will be included in the collection of digitally remastered Slayers films and OAV series, released on Blu-ray in Japan on October 30, 2015.

The film was released by ADV Films on the DVD in North America on January 1, 2004. with the other four Slayers movies in a "Movie" boxset. It was later released by ADV with the other four Slayers movies and both OVA series in a "Movies and OVAs" box set. The film was broadcast in the English version by ADV's Anime Network, and was released in Australia and New Zealand by Madman Entertainment, in France by Déclic Images, in Italy by Yamato Video (dubbed to Italian by DEA Digital Editing Audio), and in Germany by ACOG and OVA Films (dubbed to German by Circle of Arts).

=== Soundtrack ===
Slayers Great: Motion Picture "G"

Soundtrack album by Takayuki Hattori
- Released: September 26, 1996
- Recorded: 1996
- Genres: Orchestral, J-pop, jazz
- Label: King Records

A 15-track original soundtrack Slayers Great: The Motion Picture "G" (KICA-364) was composed by Takayuki Hattori and released on CD in Japan on September 26, 1997. It features three songs with vocals by Megumi Hayashibara: "Reflection (Last Summer Mix)", "Gloria ~君に届けたい~" (Gloria ~kimi ni todoketai~) and "Reflection (Movie Size Version)".

The songs were released as a single CD Reflection (KIDA-154) in 1997 and were later included in the CD collection The Best of Slayers Vol. 2 (From OVA, Movie & Game). "Reflection" alone was also included in Hayashibara's 1997 album Irāvatī.

=== Other media ===
A 102-page companion guide book Movie Edition Slayers Great was published by Fujimi Shobō in the Dragon Magazine Collection in August 1997, followed by Slayers Great Anime Comic in October 1997. The scripts for Return, Great and Gorgeous were published in the book Slayers Original.

== Reception ==
Slayers Great received mostly positive reviews. While the film's animation was universally praised, the reception of its plot and especially wacky humor proved to be the most mixed and divisive of all the Slayers films. Chris Beveridge of Mania.com, who rated it B+, wrote "there is simply something just fun and enjoyable about this particular movie" as "between the really good looking animation and the quick and snappy storyline, it flows very well," making it a "good fun that doesn't tax the brain much." According to John Sinnott of DVD Talk, Slayers Great has more "laugh out loud moments" than any other film in the franchise, and "a fast moving plot with a lot of action and laughs make this a great entry in the Slayers series." Mania.com's John Eriani similarly opined this is probably the funniest of the Slayers films and "there isn't much else to the story but that's what makes this one work so well, it doesn't really slow down in any department." Megan Lavey from that same website gave Great a perfect score of A for being "absolutely hilarious".

Other reviews were more or less critical of the film. The Video Librarian, which awarded it two-and-half stars out of four, declared it only an optional choice for anyone but Slayers fans due to its "handsome animation, but less-than-stellar storytelling." Mania.com's Dani Moure gave it a similar rating of B−, writing that "while the plot may not be the most satisfying around, even for a comedy like Slayers, the characters are as strong as ever and there's a lot of laughs to be had," and added that "if you can put up with the misgivings, Slayers Great is a lot of fun." However, Fred Patten of Animation World Network strongly disapproved of how "unabashedly silly" Great is, endorsing it "only for those who are already die-hard Slayers fans" and suggesting to see Slayers Gorgeous instead. John Huxley of Homemademech called Great "a flawed but enjoyable experience," saved from mediocrity by its character design and art style, also proposing Gorgeous as a better alternative to it. Anime News Network recommended Great for established Slayers fans, but suggested that everyone else should see the TV series first, although the review of The Slayers Movie Box by DVD Verdict's Brett Cullum called the entire set "a good introduction to the world of Slayers."
