= Magical Battle Arena =

Third-person shooter game

- Title logo
- Developer: Fly-System
- Publishers: Fly-System; AreaZERO
- Platform: Windows
- Release: JP: August 17, 2008
- Genre: Third-person shooter
- Modes: Single-player, multiplayer

Magical Battle Arena (Japanese: マジカルバトルアリーナ, Hepburn: Majikaru Batoru Arīna) is a crossover third-person shooter game developed by Fly-System in 2008. The game features characters from Magical Girl Lyrical Nanoha, Magic Knight Rayearth, Cardcaptor Sakura, Slayers, and Mahōjin Guru Guru.

== Gameplay ==
MBA gameplay in the Vs mode

Magical Battle Arena is primarily an arena third-person shooter where the players choose a character and try and defeat everyone else. The game features Story, VS, and Survival modes, along with Network Play for up to four players. It also includes Mission Mode, where players must meet specific requirements to complete missions and receive a performance grade.

Each character has basic attacks (both ranged and melee), a defense power, and a sprint. In addition to each of these basic skills each character has their own special attacks, the effects of which differ greatly between characters. The battlefield where this takes place is in the airspace above a given map. Some places are naught but open area, whereas others may provide cover and obstructions, usually in the form of tall buildings or geological formations. The characters all share a common control scheme, including frequent use of 'charging' attacks.

== Plot ==
The plot of the Story mode, like many fighting games, is mainly a framing device that serves mostly to explain how such a diverse number of characters would all be brought together. The basic, plot follows, though the specifics differ depending on which character has been chosen to play through, though all tell essentially the same story, if from different points of view.

Every millennia, in order to maintain the cosmic balance of magic amongst the multiverse a tournament is held in order to find the greatest, most powerful mage. The participants in this tournament are all kidnapped from their world of origin and transported to a separate dimension. All of them are told they must fight and win in order to return home. Along the way, one competitor the character comes across is their friend (and/or companion). They first must fight, and when the character succeeds in defeating them, they join forces. Once the character and their companion have faced and defeated all the other competitors, they face the apparent host of this tournament, and are told the truth of the fighting. In order to maintain the cosmic balance of magic among the multiverse, the strongest and most powerful mage must be made a teosu - sacrificed to run the "magical tuning system Kyrios". The last duty of a teosu is to select the next one, and the tournament was the most effective way of finding who would become the next. After these characters fight, it is decided that they will all work together to find an alternate solution to maintain the balance, though the plan is never clarified.

=== Playable characters ===
- From Cardcaptor Sakura: Kinomoto Sakura
- From Magic Knight Rayearth: Shidō Hikaru, Ryūzaki Umi and Hōōji Fū (Note: All these three are playable as a single character referred to as "Magic Knights"; added via game update)
- From Magical Girl Lyrical Nanoha: Takamachi Nanoha, Fate Testarossa
- From Magical Girl Lyrical Nanoha A's: Hayate Yagami (Note: Added via the Lyrical Pack), Vita
- From Magical Girl Lyrical Nanoha Strikers: Takamachi Nanoha 'StS' (Note: Added via the Lyrical Pack, later made initially available in the Complete Form), Fate T. Harlaown (Note: Added in the Complete Form as initially available), Gadget Drone Type-I
- From Magical Circle Guru Guru: Kukuri (Note: Added via game update), Kita Kita Oyaji
- From Slayers: Lina Inverse, Naga the Serpent, Lord of Nightmares
- From Magical Girl Kirara & Sarara ~Dioskroi Of Starlit Sky~: Hoshizora Kirara, Hoshizora Sarara
- Original characters: Lulu Gelad, Nowel Diastasis

== Release ==
The demo was released at Comiket 73. The full game was on sale in Japan at Comiket 74 on August 17, 2008. Its expansion, Lyrical Pack, was released at Comiket 75. A stand-alone version of the base game and previous expansions was published by Area-Zero as Magical Battle Arena: Complete.
