= Lost Universe =

Series of Japanese science fiction light novels

- Front cover of the first novel.

ロスト・ユニバース (Rosuto Yunibāsu)
- Light novel
- Written by: Hajime Kanzaka
- Illustrated by: Shoko Yoshinaka
- Published by: Fujimi Shobo
- Imprint: Fujimi Fantasia Bunko
- Magazine: Dragon Magazine
- Original run: December 20, 1992 – April 20, 1999
- Volumes: 5
- Manga
- Written by: Shoko Yoshinaka
- Published by: Kadokawa Shoten
- Imprint: Kadokawa Comics
- Magazine: Monthly Dragon Junior
- Original run: December 1997 – November 2002
- Volumes: 4
- Anime television series
- Directed by: Takashi Watanabe
- Produced by: Noriko Kobayashi; Yoko Morimura; Yumiko Yazaki; Masaki Yamakawa
- Written by: Hajime Kanzaka; Mayori Sekijima; Yasunori Yamada
- Music by: Osamu Tezuka
- Studio: E&G Films
- Licensed by: NA: ADV Films (2000-2007) Nozomi Entertainment (2007-present)
- Original network: TV Tokyo
- English network: US: International Channel
- Original run: April 3, 1998 – September 25, 1998
- Episodes: 26

Lost Universe (ロスト・ユニバース, Rosuto Yunibāsu) is a series of science fiction light novels, running from 1992 to 1999, by Japanese author Hajime Kanzaka. It was later adapted into a 26-episode anime series by E&G Films that ran from April 3 to September 25, 1998. The series aired on TV Tokyo in the same time slot in which the anime adaptation of Kanzaka's previous work Slayers had previously been shown.

The anime is known as "Universe Police" in China and Hong Kong.

== Plot ==
In Slayers, it is mentioned that the main characters of that series live in a world that is one of the four created by the mother of all creation, called the Lord of Nightmares. This world was known as the Red World. Lost Universe, however, takes place in a different world, known as the Black World. Whereas the demigods of the various worlds, such as Ruby-Eye Shabranigdo and Dark Star Dugradigdo had physical presence in that world, they appear in the Black World as "Lost Ships," intelligent spaceships of unknown origin that have powerful or somewhat divine powers with more advanced technology than any other device in the universe.

Their rarity and superiority have sparked suggestions that they have been made by an advanced ancient alien civilization or come from the beginning of the universe itself. Being a central part to the plot, the "Lost Ships" are intelligent beings with different loyalties and even their own agenda. Kain Blueriver, a "trouble contractor," inherits a "Lost Ship" from his grandmother and from there, he and his sidekick Milly, together with Canal, the ship's computer, journey to find a source of the evil that threatens the universe.

== Characters ==
Kain Blueriver

Voiced by: Souichiro Hoshi (Japanese); Steve Metz (English)

Kain Blueriver (カイン・ブルーリバー, Kain Burūribaa) is an intergalactic trouble-Contractor. He is characterised as a tough and reckless adventurer who captains Sword-Breaker, the legendary lost spaceship from an ancient civilization. He acquired his spaceship from his grandmother and constantly recites quotes of her. He is shown to be a free spirit, and keeps an open mind whatever the situation. Ever the optimist, he is always confident he will prevail over whatever troubles await him. His motto is "carry out any difficult assignment to the end!" Kain is the master of the Psi-Blade, a weapon of psi energy, requiring tremendous mental strength. He wears a black cloak, likes his grandmother.
Millie

Voiced by: Tomoko Ishimura (Japanese); Larissa Wolcott (English)

Millennium Feria "Millie" Nocturne (ミレニアム・フェリア・ノクターン, Mireniamu Feria Nokutaan), is a happy-go-lucky girl whose catchphrase is that she aspires to be the "best in the universe." She joins Kain on their space adventures as an assistant and sometimes private detective. She has very basic detecting skills like opening a locked door with her hair pin. At work, she is indeed the best shot in the universe, but at home on Sword-Breaker is another matter. Providing a bit of comedy, she routinely blows up the kitchen, but somehow the meals turn out delicious.
Canal Volfield

Voiced by: Megumi Hayashibara (Japanese); Jessica Schwartz (English)

Canal Volfeld (キャナル・ヴォルフィード, Kyanaru Vorufiido) is a female human-like hologram that serves as the Sword-Breaker ship's computer. She has green hair styled in two long braids. She has a distinctive personality, emotions and reasoning abilities. Her usual form is a teenage girl, but if necessary, she can morph her form into a baby, a noble lady or other objects; whatever is needed to help Kain in his missions. Her motto is "carry out any difficult assignment to the end, as long as it shows a profit!" In this respect she is much like Lina Inverse from the series Slayers, with whom she shares a voice actress. Canal's mind functions as a computer, and she is very practical, analytical and logical. On the other hand, she sometimes shows her emotions when she teases Kain for his mistakes or has a quarrel with Millie. She is a bit selfish, doing a lot of negative actions for the Sword-Breaker owner (Kain Blueriver), like turning off Life System only for getting a job that Kain did not want.
Rail Claymore

Voiced by: Hikaru Midorikawa (Japanese); Bill Wise (English)

He is a handsome and smart police inspector of Interstellar Police. Kain has a sort of inescapable "give-and-take" relationship with this young inspector. He often contacts the crew of the Sword-Breaker with mission requests that are not always requests.
Nina Mercury

Voiced by: Masami Suzuki (Japanese); Camille Chen (English)

The secretary of Raily Claymore, Nina is so deeply in love with Raily that she is fascinated by his gaze and forgets what she is doing. Two running gags in the series focus on her accidentally spilling coffee on Raily, and shortening out any machine with the slightest touch. The latter is actually useful in several adventures.
Stargazer

Voiced by: Jouji Nakata (Japanese); George Spelvin (English)

He is the master of a giant company called Gazer Konzern and the boss of mega-crime organization Nightmare. He is the master of the Lost Ship Dark Star, and intends to control the whole universe. Stargazer possesses a power to destroy the mind of a person from afar.
Spreader of Darkness

Voiced by: Yasunori Matsumoto (Japanese); David Stokey (English)

He is a young-looking guy who works for Stargazer, and master of Goln-Nova, one of the legendary Lost Ships. He commands Glen and Carly at Nightmare. He was injured in the battle with Alice ten years ago and has since been in stasis. He woke up after sleeping for 87,016 hours in a capsule.

== Media ==
=== Light novels ===
When the first novel of Lost Universe was released in 1992, it enjoyed moderate success. Kanzaka was already in negotiations for the Slayers anime.

=== Manga ===
A manga adaptation by Shoko Yoshinaka was published in Kadokawa Shoten's Monthly Dragon Junior magazine from December 1997 to November 2002 and was collected into four volumes.

=== Anime ===
Lost Universe is distributed in North America by Enoki Films, and was originally licensed for American distribution by ADV Films, who released the series onto both dubbed and subtitled VHS tapes and bilingual DVD. Following ADV's bankruptcy in 2009, the rights to the anime have since transferred to Nozomi Entertainment who re-released the complete series in a new bilingual DVD box set. The entirety of the show's English dub can be streamed and watched for free on Nozomi Entertainment's YouTube channel.

== Reception ==
Episode 26 of the anime won first place Animage's Anime Grand Prix "Best Episode" category, and the anime itself placed third in the "Best Title" category, behind Nadesico and Cowboy Bebop. Canal Volfield won third place in the "Best Character" category, behind Ruri Hoshino from Nadesico and Sakura Kinomoto from Cardcaptor Sakura. The title song "Infinity" won second place in "Best Song", after "Dearest" from Nadesico and before "Tank!" from Cowboy Bebop.

At THEM Anime Reviews, Lost Universe received a 4 out 5 score, judging it a well done show, with the caveat that the compression of (five) novels into a single season of anime "doesn't do its intricate story justice". The series' VHS Vol. 6-7 were reviewed at Anime News Network', with the reviewer concluding that are mediocre.

The entry in The Encyclopedia of Science Fiction notes that Lost Universe is a "niche and quirky example of late-1990s sf anime: a show where a snarky AI girl, a caped hero, and a bumbling sidekick fight galactic evil while starships trade laser fire one moment and jokes the next; a vision that might just be regarded as a low-brow, anime take on Iain M. Banks's Culture".
