= Lina Inverse =

Fictional mage protagonist of the Slayers franchise

- Slayers character
- Lina in Granblue Fantasy
- First appearance: Slayers volume 1: The Slayers (1989)
- Created by: Hajime Kanzaka; Rui Araizumi
- Voiced by: Japanese Megumi Hayashibara English Lisa Ortiz Cynthia Martinez

In-universe information
- Title: Lina the Pink
- Occupation: Adventurer sorceress
- Family: Unnamed grandfather Unnamed parents Luna Inverse (older sister)

Lina Inverse (Japanese: リナ・インバース, Hepburn: Rina Inbāsu) is a fictional character and the main protagonist of the comic fantasy-themed light novel, manga and anime series Slayers. Lina Inverse is a young yet very powerful sorceress travelling the world in search of adventure and treasure. Lina has been consistently voiced by Megumi Hayashibara in Japanese, dubbed by Lisa Ortiz in the English version of the TV series and by Cynthia Martinez in the English version of the films and original video animation episodes. Slayers novels are narrated by Lina herself from her point of view.

She was one of the most popular anime characters of the late 1990s and has since retained a sizable fan following. There have been also characters based on or inspired by her in both Slayers and in other works.

== Creation and design ==
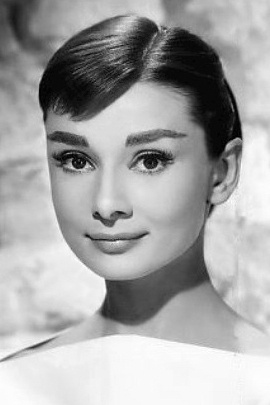
Audrey Hepburn, the inspiration for Lina's visual design

The Slayers creator Hajime Kanzaka had originally created the characters of Lina and Luna (the name of Lina's unseen sister in Slayers) as the heroines of his science-fiction story that he had written when he was in high school and in which Luna was the protagonist and Lina was her clone. Years later, when Kanzaka began writing Slayers as a Western-style fantasy saga of Lina Inverse, his friend and the series' illustrator Rui Araizumi took an inspiration for her visual design when he by chance came upon a vintage film with the actress Audrey Hepburn on TV. According to the NTUT's John Lance Griffith, "To the extent that Lina is an independent, powerful woman ('a girl today' in contrast to the traditional Japanese woman), she follows in the tradition of Western lady knights and sorceresses: the tradition of Spenser's Britomart, of Tolkien's Arwen and Eowyn."

As envisioned by Kanzaka, Lina has a petite body type and is 147 cm (4 feet 10 inches) tall. She has two moles on her forehead, which are usually covered by her headband. Despite her supposed to be having a very flat chest, so much she can be confused for a boy, Lina is often depicted by Araizumi with larger breasts due to his personal preferences, which would be then carried over to much of other media too. Lina's appearance whilst wearing her homeland's folk clothing in the film Slayers: The Motion Picture is a nod to Ranma Saotome, the titular character from Ranma ½, who too (like Lina) is voiced by Megumi Hayashibara in Japanese.

== Character and appearances ==
=== Lina Inverse ===
Lina Inverse was born in the fictional kingdom of Zephilia. Since her mother used to be a mercenary magic user, Lina, suffering from inferiority complex to her sister, decided she would like to be a sorceress and coaxed her parents to send her to the Sorcerer's Guild school. Her older sister, the Knight of Shiphied Luna Inverse, was the darling of both her parents and the town, excelling in martial studies and quickly beginning to make a name for herself.

Although Lina has faced down dragons, monsters, and even dark lords with little fear, the mere mention of Luna's name sends her into terrified hysterics. When Lina was a child, she sold images of Luna naked in order to earn money and, in turn, Luna punished Lina so severely that Lina has feared her ever since. This incident stemmed from an already ongoing, somewhat abusive dynamic, where Luna's harsh discipline traumatized Lina while paradoxically shaping her unshakeable mental fortitude and bold demeanor.

Lina has many different nicknames, including "Bandit Killer" and "Dragon Spooker", neither of which she likes. To her, her most embarrassing nickname is "Lina the Pink", which is her official title amongst the Guild.

After leaving home, Lina became an independent adventurer and sorceress. During this period, she met Naga the Serpent, a powerful but eccentric sorceress who proclaimed herself Lina's greatest rival. Naga subsequently began crossing paths with Lina, and the two became involved in a series of comedic misadventures, frequently taking on odd jobs, mercenary work, and fighting local bandits and monsters. These adventures form the basis of the Slayers Special and Slayers Smash prequel light novel series, which span roughly one to two years of Lina's early journey. Although Lina and Naga constantly compete and argue, they repeatedly cooperate when facing common enemies. It was during these early travels that Lina earned a formidable reputation for relentlessly hunting down bandit gangs for fun and profit, routinely confiscating their ill-gotten treasure for herself. Her crusade against them was so thorough that by the events of the later Slayers Revolution, bandits have become an "endangered species," prompting her to take up pirate hunting instead. Her loose partnership with Naga eventually came to an end shortly before the start of the main series. However, in the children's novel adaptation Slayers (Tsubasa Bunko edition), Lina and Naga continue traveling together and ultimately meet Gourry Gabriev as a duo.

Although she is an adolescent (aged 15 to 17 in the main series, and even younger in Slayers Special), Lina is an exceptionally powerful mage with a strong passion for money, treasure — particularly magical artifacts — and food. She commands high-level black magic spells, most notably the devastating Dragon Slave, which serves as her signature attack. In the anime and manga adaptations (unlike the original light novels), she frequently uses collateral destruction with little provocation, albeit portrayed in a comedic context. Consequently, Lina has earned a reputation as a calamitous "Enemy of All Who Live", among many other similar monikers (such as "Empress of Destruction", "Natural Disaster Mage" and "Flat-Chested Demon"). Despite her notorious infamy and lack of physical maturity, Lina views herself as a charismatic, dignified, and beautiful sorceress. In addition to her volatile personality, Lina is characterized as selfish, short-tempered, and gluttonous, and harbors an inferiority complex regarding her bust size — a trait frequently ridiculed by her well-endowed rival, Naga. Beyond her comedic flaws, Lina has achieved historic feats, including destroying two pieces of the Demon King Shabranigdo and assisting in the destruction of high-ranking Mazoku such as Demon Dragon Garv and Hellmaster Phibrizzo. In anime she also played a pivotal role in defeating Dark Star, Shabranigdo's counterpart from a parallel universe. Due to these monumental achievements, Lina constantly attracts the attention of demonkind, making her a primary target of their sinister plots and attacks.

At the beginning of the main series, Lina encounters the swordsman Gourry Gabriev and the chimera warrior Zelgadis Greywords. When forced to fight a reincarnated fragment of Shabranigdo, Lina invokes the Giga Slave — a spell drawing power directly from the Lord of Nightmares, the supreme deity of the Slayers universe — destroying the Demon King, though she vows never to cast it again after realizing its potential to erase existence. the highest deity of the Slayers universe, but has no plans to ever use it again after almost ending the world. She later befriends Princess Amelia Wil Tesla Seyruun and the priestess Sylphiel Nels Lahda. As her journey progresses, she is manipulated by the enigmatic priest Xellos into the conflict between the Mazoku Lords Chaos Dragon Garv and Hellmaster Phibrizzo. Later in the light novels, Lina teams up with the mercenary duo Luke and Milina, eventually confronting Mazoku Lord Dynast Grausherra and uncovering his conspiratorial schemes. In the anime continuity, which branches off into original storylines, Lina is recruited by the dragoness Filia Ul Copt to prevent the awakening of Dark Star in Slayers Try. In Slayers Revolution and Evolution-R, she is arrested under false charges, leading to an adventure involving the synthetic creature Pokota — who can also cast the Dragon Slave — and a second confrontation with the legendary Demon Beast Zannafar.

Since their initial meeting, Gourry has served as Lina's primary traveling companion, appearing alongside her across most Slayers media. Across the light novels, manga, audio dramas, and video games, their dynamic remains a strictly non-romantic friendship based on mutual trust. Author Hajime Kanzaka deliberately omitted romantic developments in the original works, as the adult man, Gourry primarily views himself as her guardian. Most adaptation writers and spin-off authors generally maintained this stance, refraining from altering their dynamic due to an age gap that makes romantic involvement inappropriate; for instance, in the Slayers (Tsubasa Bunko edition ), Lina's age was lowered to 12 to further emphasize this dynamic. However, an exception occurs in Slayers NEXT, where the anime staff included brief romantic overtones that led to a momentary, unconscious kiss during Gourry's rescue of Lina from the Lord of Nightmares. Both characters immediately forgot the event afterward, returning their relationship to its original status for the remainder of the series.

Lina's adventures remain open-ended, with her story continuing to unfold in a new narrative arc of the main light novel series without a definitive finale in sight. As a notable piece of trivia, a comedic pseudo-closure to her journey is depicted in the audio drama Slayers Kita Kaette EX #4. Set decades later, this story features an 84-year-old Lina and Naga drinking tea and reminiscing about their deceased companions, only for a heated argument about their past to spark a spell-dueling battle that leaves both elderly sorceresses with broken hips.

Lina is also the main protagonists through the entire official series of the non-canonical Slayers role-playing video games from the 1990s, and further appears as a player character or an avatar option in the role-playing video games Elemental Story, Heroes Phantasia, Fantasia Re:Build, and Toram Online, with Naga in the action video game Magical Battle Arena and in the role-playing video game Valkyrie Anatomia: The Origin, with Gourry in the role-playing video games La Tale and Langrisser and again in Valkyrie Anatomia, with both Naga and Gourry in the role-playing video game Granblue Fantasy, and with them as well as other Slayers main characters in LINE Rangers, Puzzle & Dragons, Tales of the Rays, Overlord: Mass for the Dead, Ragnarok M (only in China), Guardian Tales, and Elemental Story. Her character has been also featured in a range of Slayers merchandise, such as food in the Slayers theme cafe in Tokyo, many various figurines and dolls, including Nendoroid and Dollfie among others, licensed cosplay outfits, a perfume line, another perfume, and even an augmented and virtual reality compatible digital figure.

=== Derived characters ===
Several different versions of Lina populate the world of Slayers due to various plots. In one story from the prequels, Lina and Naga are exposed to a mirror that creates an exact opposite of whoever looks in it. The wizard using it expects this to produce dark and violent version of the two that would side with him and destroy the originals, but the mirror copies turn out sweet, kind, generous, and extremely concerned about the feelings of each other and everyone around them. In their attempts to break the spell, Lina and Naga actually wind up creating dozens of such doppelgängers of themselves, which go on to found an entire village full of philanthropic Linas and Nagas. A slightly adapted version of this story, which resulted in the mirror being destroyed without creating more than the initial copies, served as the basis of the Slayers Special OAV episode "Mirror Mirror".

In the Slayers TV series, Gourry and Lina are both the subject of an attempt at cloning, which spawns a number of miniature, super deformed versions of them both; the tiny clones fight to humorous effect, and after the mini Linas win, they all disintegrate. Even more, in this case mostly lifelike, clones of Lina were created by Xellos' master Zellas Metallium in the video game Slayers in which one of them, who believes herself to be the real Lina, is a playable character and the game's initial protagonist. Furthermore, a super deformed, giant, toylike fighting golem named "Piko-Piko Lina-chan" is constructed in the film Slayers Great in a distorted image of Lina's that emphasises her kawaii (cute) attributes, much to Lina's dismay and anger as she believed she had been chosen to model for its creation because of her (self-imagined) great beauty; it is also featured in the video game Slayers Royal 2.

In the science fiction themed Lost Universe, Hajime Kanzaka's another media franchise set in a universe parallel to that of Slayers, the traits and personas of Lina and Gourry were mixed together to create its male protagonist, Kain Blueriver. The manga miniseries Slayers Light Magic features a young boy named Light Inverse who dreams to become a mage in a scientifically advanced futuristic world.

== Reception ==
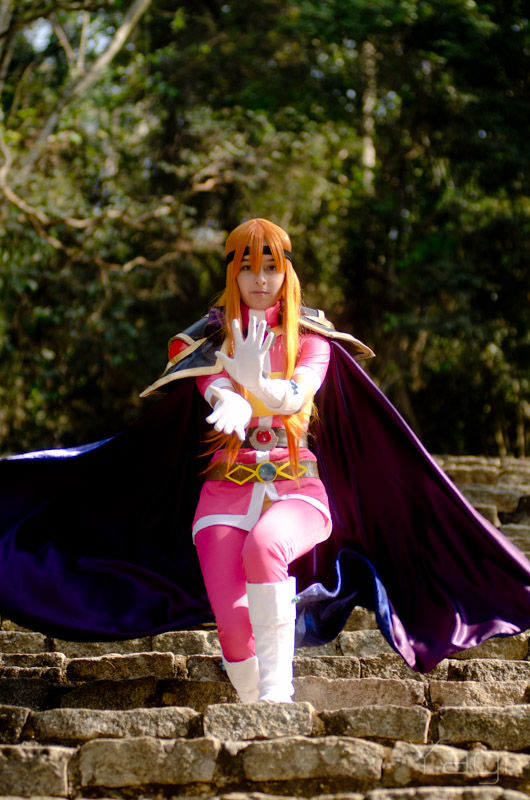
The success of her character also made Lina a popular subject of cosplay.

Lina Inverse has become a popular and critically praised character both in Japan and overseas; writing in 1999, Dave Halverson called Slayers' Lina and Naga "two of anime [medium]'s brightest stars in both Japan and the U.S." Lina won Animage magazine's Anime Grand Prix 1998 award for the best female character of 1997, also placing second in 1997 (after Rei Ayanami, also voiced by Megumi Hayashibara), fourth in 1996, and eight in 1999. In 2000, she won the Best of Dragon Magazine popular vote in two categories, including Best Heroine. In 2004, readers of the Japanese magazine Animedia voted her the seventh most popular female character in the Animedia 23rd Anniversary Anime Awards.

Retrospectively, Japanese magazine Famitsu declared her the 15th top anime heroine of the 1990s. In 2020, from Anthony Gramuglia from Comic Book Resources ranked her and Usagi Tsukino from Sailor Moon as the best anime heroines of the 1990s, describing them as "two fantastic characters who have remained popular and iconic for decades." The voice of Lina Inverse has since remained one of Hayashibara's best known roles. Lina's local dubbing also became one of the most popular roles of Emanuela Pacotto in Italy.

Lina has been also included in many top lists by various websites. For example, The Mary Sue's Citlin Donovan included her among "Six Leading Ladies of Shonen Anime" and the SBS PopAsia's Jamaica dela Cruz named her as number one "baddest anime female". Anime News Network's Lynzee Loveridge put "Lina Inverse and Company" at second spot in "Traditional Fantasy Parties", while Gia Manry from the same website ranked her first among all anime's "Easiest Good Guys to Make Angry", as well as placing Lina second on her lists of "Destroyers of the Fourth Wall" and "Most Destructive Heroes".

=== Cultural impact ===
The character's enduring popularity led to several cameo appearances in various other media, including the role-playing game Ironclaw (a fangame furry style homage on the First Edition cover, along with Naga), the video game Shadow Warrior (in an in-game poster), and in the first episode of the anime series Full Metal Panic! (shown on a cover of Dragon Magazine). The protagonists of the 2002 anime miniseries Cosplay Complex, Chako and Reika, dress up as Naga and Lina in the third episode, and Lina and Naga themselves made a cameo appearance in French comic book series Les Légendaires Origines in 2014.

A Slayers-inspired player character Lina is part of the Dota video game series: in the Warcraft III mod Defense of the Ancients, she shares the name of "Lina Inverse", while simply going by "Lina" in Dota 2 and is referred to as "Lina the Slayer" in the games lore; in both games, she is a redhead whose spells' names reference these in Slayers: "Dragon Slave", "Light Strike Array" (Explosion Array), and "Laguna Blade" (Ragna Blade). Lina and her "Dragon Slave" are also parodied in the 2012 anime series Love, Chunibyo & Other Delusions (in the episode "Regret of... the Scriptures of Darkness (Mabinogion)") and in the 2015 American animated series Star vs. the Forces of Evil (in the episode "The Battle for Mewni").

== See also ==
- List of Slayers characters
