= Cynthia Martinez =

US voice actress

- Occupation: Voice actress
- Years active: 1998–present

Cynthia Martinez is an American voice actress who works for ADV Films and Seraphim Digital/Sentai Filmworks. Her first roles were that of Lina Inverse in the Slayers films and OVAs and as Hermes in the original anime adaptation of Kino's Journey. Besides these, she is also known for the lead roles of Mayu from Elfen Lied, Illyasviel von Einzbern from the Fate/kaleid liner Prisma Illya series, Tami Nishimikado from Hanayamata, Sora Naegino from Kaleido Star, and Mikako Nagamine from Makoto Shinkai's Voices of a Distant Star. She was announced as a guest of honor for the Ani-Jam convention in 2013.

== Filmography ==
=== Anime ===
Year	Title	Role	Notes	Source
1999	Martian Successor Nadesico	Hikaru Amano		
2002	Excel Saga	Excel Kobayashi		
2003	Kino's Journey	Hermes		
2004	Kaleido Star	Sora Naegino		
2004	Puni Puni Poemy	Poemi Watanabe		
2004	This Ugly yet Beautiful World	Hikari		
2005	Air	Kanna		
2005	Elfen Lied	Mayu	also OVA	
2005	Pani Poni	Otome Akiyama		
2007	Shattered Angels	Tarlotte		
2010	Blue Drop	Mie Sato		
2012	Book of Bantorra	Noloty		
2012	AKB0048	Minami Takahashi the 5th		
2013	Bodacious Space Pirates	Lily Bell	also film adaptation	
2013	Battle Girls: Time Paradox	Sorin Otomo		
2013	Girls und Panzer	Shinobu Kawanishi	also OVA	
2013	Kids on the Slope	Mariko		
2013	Phi Brain	Airi Mizutani	also season 2	
2013	Nyan Koi	Akari Kirishima		
2014	Devil Survivor 2: The Animation	Airi Ban		
2014	Infinite Stratos	Maya Yamada	also season 2	
2014	Fate/kaleid liner Prisma Illya series	Illyasviel von Einzbern	also season 2-3	
2014	Problem Children	Sandra Dortlake		
2014	Upotte	Fara		
2015	Black Bullet	Midori Fuse		
2015	The World God Only Knows	Jun Nagase, Chihiro Kosaka	season 3	
2016	Cross Ange	Momoka Oginome		
2016	Hanayamata	Tami Nishimikado		
2016	Trinity Seven	Yui Kurata		
2017	Diabolik Lovers	Azusa Mukami (young)	season 2	
2017	Onigiri	Shizuka Gozen		
2017	School Live	Miki Naoki		

=== Film ===
Year	Title	Role	Notes	Source
1998	Slayers The Motion Picture	Lina Inverse		
2003	Slayers Return	Lina Inverse		
2003	Voices of a Distant Star	Mikako Nagamine		
2014	Short Peace	Kao		
2016	Girls und Panzer der Film	Shinobu Kawanishi		
