= Hajime Kanzaka =

Japanese novelist and manga story writer (born 1964)

- Born: July 17, 1964 (age 62); Hyōgo Prefecture, Japan
- Occupations: Novelist, writer
- Years active: 1989-present
- Known for: Slayers, Lost Universe

Hajime Kanzaka (神坂 一, Kanzaka Hajime; born July 17, 1964) is a Japanese novelist and manga story writer from Asago, Hyōgo Prefecture. Kanzaka is best known for writing the Slayers novels that were adapted into the hit anime series, OVA and manga spin-offs.

== Career ==
After graduating Kobe Art Technical College, Kanzaka worked as a salaryman until, on a whim, he submitted Slayers to the 1st Fantasia Awards (1989). It was nominated as the runner-up, and due to his home not having a telephone, he received the news via the mail. The same year, Slayers began serialization under the Dragon Magazine, making his official debut.

During the early days of the light novel industry, most writers came from other non-writing professions, but nowadays most light novelists debut due to winning awards, a trend seemingly started by Kanzaka. Later, he would be a judge for the Fantasia Awards. (Note: 8th to 20th Fantasia Awards.)

In-addition to publishing with Fujimi Shobo, he has also had science-fiction and fantasy works published under Kadokawa Sneaker Bunko, expanding his readership. When the Slayers anime adaptation was released in the late 90's, Kanzaka ranked highly in the author category of the Japanese High Tax Payer Registry.

== Works ==
- Slayers (スレイヤーズ, Sureiyāzu) - light novels, manga
  - Slayers Return (スレイヤーズ RETURN, Sureiyāzu ritān) - movie
  - Slayers Special (スレイヤーズすぺしゃる, Sureiyāzu supesharu) - ova
  - Slayers Great (スレイヤーズ ぐれえと, Sureiyāzu gurēto) - movie
  - Slayers Excellent (スレイヤーズえくせれんと, Sureiyāzu ekuserento) - ova
  - Slayers Gorgeous (スレイヤーズごうじゃす, Sureiyāzu gōjasu) - movie
- Lost Universe (ロスト・ユニバース, Rosuto Yunibāsu) - light novels, TV series.
- Higaeri Quest (日帰りクエスト, Higaeri Kuesuto) - manga story (shōjo).
- Yami no Sadame o Seōmono (闇の運命を背負う者) - manga story (fantasy).
- Sheriff Stars MS (シェリフスターズ MS, Sherifu Sutāzu Emuesu) - manga story (science fiction).
- DOORS I Mazekoze Shuuzenya (DOORS I まぜこぜ修繕屋) - light novel (shōnen).
