= Dave Halverson =

American video game journalist

Dave Halverson is an American video game journalist who has been the founder, publisher, and editor-in-chief of GameFan (where he wrote reviews as E. Storm, Skid and Takahara), Gamers' Republic, Play, and currently the new versions of GameFan. Halverson is regarded as a well-known but a controversial and polarizing figure in video game journalism regarding his personality, actions and statements, such as his aggressive criticism of the poor reception of Golden Axe: Beast Rider by many other outlets, and also initially giving the Xbox 360 version of Sonic the Hedgehog (2006) a 9.5, which is regarded as one of the worst video games of all-time. He also reviewed anime releases, including for Gamers' Republic.
