= Maria Kawamura =

Japanese actress (born 1961)

- 川村 万梨阿
- Born: Shigeyo Kawamura; November 21, 1961 (age 64); Setagaya, Tokyo, Japan
- Occupations: Actress; voice actress; singer
- Years active: 1983–present
- Notable work: Slayers as Naga the Serpent
- Spouse: Mamoru Nagano (m. 1991)
- Website: automaticflowers.ne.jp/maria/index2.html

Shigeyo Kawamura (川村 繁代, Kawamura Shigeyo; born November 21, 1961), better known by the stage name Maria Kawamura (川村 万梨阿, Kawamura Maria), is a Japanese actress, voice actress and singer from Setagaya, Tokyo. Kawamura is a freelancer and a former affiliate of Arts Vision. In 1991, she married manga artist Mamoru Nagano.

In addition to her voice acting and acting work, Kawamura is also a singer. She has released 9 studio albums, 1 compilation album, 1 live album, and 10 singles. Here is a list of her albums and singles:

== Discography ==
=== Studio albums ===
- Green and Gold ~ The Five Star Stories (1988)
- Canary (1989)
- "Spring Dream" Sanctus (1991)
- Moon and Sakuragai (1993)
- GothicMade Flower Poetry Girl (2007)
- Summer Without You (2011)
- Eternal Light (2014)
- Angel's Singing Voice (2017)

=== Compilation album ===
- Maria Kawamura Best Collection (2000)

=== Live album ===
- Maria Kawamura Live 2010 〜Anata no Koto wo Kangaeteru〜 (2010)

=== Singles ===
- From The Five Star Stories (1988)
- Phantom Sky (1988)
- Midnight Orchestra (1989)
- Summer Without You (2011)
- Yumeiro no Kaze (2012)
- Melody of Light (2014)
- Eternal Light (2014)
- Angel's Singing Voice (2017)

== Filmography ==
=== Television animation ===
1980s

- Aura Battler Dunbine (1983) (Cham Fau)
- Mobile Suit Zeta Gundam (1985) (Beltorchika Irma)
- Tales of Little Women (1987) (Sally Gardiner)
- Peter Pan no Bōken (1989) (Tiger Lily, Luna)

1990s

- Robin Hood no Daiboken (1990) (Winifred Scarlet)
- Kyatto Ninden Teyandee (1990) (Tokugawa Usako)
- Trapp Family Story (1991) (Hedvic von Trapp)
- Sailor Moon S (1994) (Eudial)
- Romeo no Aoi Sora (1995) (Angeletta)
- Juuni Senshi Bakuretsu Eto Ranger (1995) (Tart, Princess Aura)
- Neon Genesis Evangelion (1996) (Kyōko Zeppelin Soryu)
- Revolutionary Girl Utena (1997) (Mamiya Chida, Shadow Girl A)
- Brain Powerd (1998) (Higgins Saz)
- Excel Saga (1999) (Kyoko)
- Pokémon (1999) (Kanna)

2000s

- Ghost Stories (2000) (Kuchisake-onna) (scrapped episode)
- Tokyo Mew Mew (2002) (Rei Nishina)
- Pokémon Advanced Generation (2006) (Yuma)
- xxxHolic (2006) (Hanahana)
- Pokémon Diamond and Pearl (2007) (Momi)
- Darker than Black (2007) (Shizuka Isozaki)
- Rosario + Vampire Capu2 (2008) (Lilith)

2010s

- Humanity Has Declined (2012) (Narrator)
- Red Data Girl (2013) (Shizue Sōda)

Unknown date

- Anpanman (Princess Mizūmi, Kun Fūrin, Shanpū-chan, Chinkuru, Kami Fūsen Ponpon)
- City Hunter 2 (Yuriko)
- Gall Force (Eluza)
- Ghost Sweeper Mikami (Terusa, Mermaid of Namiko)
- Gunbuster (Jung Freud)
- Heavy Metal L-Gaim (Lillith Fuau, Gaw Ha Leccee)
- Kyūkyoku Chōjin R (Mari Saionji)
- Mamotte! Lollipop (Sarasa)
- Māru-ōkoku no Ningyō-hime 2 (Kururu)
- NG Knight Lamune & 40 (Toshiō, Reiyū)
- Osomatsu-kun (1988 series) (Kumiko)
- Other Life: Azure Dreams (Cherrl Child)
- PoPoLoCrois (Queen Narushia)
- Rockman DASH 2 - Episode 2: Great Inheritance (Matilda Caskett & Yuuna)
- Saber Marionette J (Tamasaburō)
- Saint Seiya (Freya)
- Slayers (Naga the Serpent/Nama)
- Super Robot Wars UX (Cham Fau)
- Tonde Burin (Nanako Tateishi)
- Uta Kata (Saya Kogure)
- Valkyrie Profile (Frei (known as "Freya" in U.S. release))
- Valkyrie Profile 2: Silmeria (Frei)
- Valkyrie Profile: Lenneth (Frei)
- Watashi no Ashinaga Ojisan (Karen Patterson)
- Yu Yu Hakusho (Hina)

=== Original video animation (OVA) ===
- Cleopatra DC (1989) (Cleopatra Corns)
- The Five Star Stories (1989) (Lachesis)
- Yagami-kun's Family Affairs (1990) (Mayuki Ikari)
- Ayane's High Kick (1997) (Sakurako Miyagawa)
- El-Hazard (1997) (Ifurita)
- Mobile Suit Gundam Unicorn (2010) (Beltorchika Irma)

=== Theatrical animation ===
- Mobile Suit Gundam: Char's Counterattack (1988) (Quess Paraya)
- Gothicmade (2012) (Berin)
- Mobile Suit Gundam: Hathaway (2021) (Quess Paraya)
- Mobile Suit Gundam: Hathaway – The Sorcery of Nymph Circe (2026) (Quess Paraya)

=== Video games ===
- Sengoku Blade: Sengoku Ace Episode II (1996) (Miko / Koyori)
- Ken-chan to Chie Asobi (1997)
- Ace Combat 3: Electrosphere (1999) (Cynthia Bridgitte Fitzgerald)
- Harukanaru Toki no Naka de (2000) (Shirin)
- Valkyrie Profile: Covenant of the Plume (2008) (Frei)
- E.X. Troopers (2012) (Seruka)
- Tactics Ogre: Reborn (2022) (Sherri Phoraena)

=== Dubbing ===
==== Live-action ====
- Family Ties (Justine Bateman)
- Fraggle Rock (Mokey Fraggle)
- Tucker: The Man and His Dream (Marilyn Lee Tucker (Nina Siemaszko))

==== Western animation ====
- An American Tail: Fievel Goes West (Tanya)
- An American Tail: The Treasure of Manhattan Island (Tanya)
- An American Tail: The Mystery of the Night Monster (Tanya)
- Tom and Jerry (Toodles Galore)

== Accolades ==
- Kazue Takahashi Memorial Award at the 17th Seiyu Awards (2023)
