= List of Slayers songs =

This is a list of songs associated with the anime adaptations of the Slayers light novel series.

== TV opening songs ==
Title	Season	Notes
Get Along	The Slayers	Performed by Megumi Hayashibara and Masami Okui; Lyrics by Satomi Arimori, composed by Hidetoshi Satō and arranged by Tsutomu Ōhira
Give a Reason	Slayers NEXT	Performed by Megumi Hayashibara; Lyrics by Satomi Arimori, composed by Hidetoshi Satō and arranged by Tsutomu Ōhira
Breeze	Slayers TRY	Performed by Megumi Hayashibara; Lyrics by Satomi Arimori, composed by Hidetoshi Satō and arranged by Keiji Soeda
Plenty of Grit	Slayers Revolution	Performed by Megumi Hayashibara; Lyrics by MEGUMI, composed by Hidetoshi Satō and arranged by Tsutomu Ōhira
Front Breaking	Slayers Evolution-R	Performed by Megumi Hayashibara; Lyrics by MEGUMI

== TV ending songs ==
Title	Season	Notes
Kujikenai Kara! (Because I'll never give up!)	The Slayers	Performed by Megumi Hayashibara and Masami Okui; Lyrics by Satomi Arimori, composed by Masami Okui and arranged by Tsutomu Ōhira
Jama wa Sasenai (邪魔はさせない) (Don't Interfere)	Slayers NEXT	Performed by Masami Okui; Lyrics by Satomi Arimori, composed by Hidetoshi Satō and arranged by Tsutomu Ōhira
Don't Be Discouraged	Slayers TRY	Performed by Megumi Hayashibara; Lyrics by MEGUMI, composed by Hidetoshi Satō and arranged by Keiji Soeda
Somewhere	Slayers TRY	Performed by Houko Kuwashima; The ending for episode 26; Lyrics, composition and arrangement by Chisa Tanabe
Revolution	Slayers Revolution	Performed by Megumi Hayashibara; Lyrics by MEGUMI, composition and arrangement by Kou Takahashi
Sunadokei	Slayers Evolution-R	Performed by Megumi Hayashibara; Lyrics by MEGUMI
Just Begun	Slayers Evolution-R	Performed by Megumi Hayashibara; Lyrics by MEGUMI

== Movie/OVA/game themes ==
Song title	Movie/OVA	Notes
Feel Well	Slayers Premium (ova)	Performed by Megumi Hayashibara; Lyrics by Megumi, composed and arranged by Gō Takahashi
Gloria ~kimi ni todoketai~ (Gloria ~I want to deliver to you~))	Slayers Great (movie)	Performed by Megumi Hayashibara; Lyrics by Satomi Arimori, composed by Kazuhiko Matsunaga, and arranged by Masaki Iwamoto
I & Myself	Slayers Royal 2 (game)	Performed by Megumi Hayashibara; Lyrics by Satomi Arimori, composed by Harry Markland, and arranged by Shō Goshima
Just be Conscious	Slayers Return (movie)	Performed by Megumi Hayashibara; Lyrics by Megumi, composed by Hidetoshi Satō, and arranged by Keiji Soeda
Kagirinai Yokubou no Naka ni (Unlimited Desire)	Slayers Special (ova)	Performed by Megumi Hayashibara; Lyrics by Satomi Arimori, composed by Hidetoshi Satō, and arranged by Shō Goshima
Midnight Blue	Slayers: the Motion Picture	Performed by Megumi Hayashibara; Lyrics by Satomi Arimori, composed by Hidetoshi Satō, and arranged by Shō Goshima
Never Die	Slayers Excellent (ova)	Performed by Masami Okui
Raging Waves	Slayers Gorgeous (movie)	Performed by Megumi Hayashibara
Reflection	Slayers Great (movie)	Performed by Megumi Hayashibara; Lyrics by Megumi, composed by Hidetoshi Satō and arranged by Keiji Soeda
Rumba Rumba	Slayers Premium (ova)	Performed by Megumi Hayashibara; Lyrics and composition by Sora Izumikawa, arrangement by Tomoji Sogawa
Run all the Way	Slayers Return (movie)	Performed by Megumi Hayashibara; Lyrics by Satomi Arimori, composed and arranged by Toshiyuki Ōmori
Touch Yourself	Slayers Royal (game)	Performed by Megumi Hayashibara; Lyrics by Megumi, composed by Hidetoshi Satō and arranged by Keiji Soeda

== Radio drama songs ==
Song title	Radio drama	Notes
Going History	Slayers EXTRA	Performed by Megumi Hayashibara; Lyrics by Satomi Arimori, composed by Hidetoshi Satō, and arranged by Atsushi Onosawa
Majime na Kikkake (Serious Chance)	Slayers EXTRA	Performed by Masami Okui
Naked Mind	Slayers EXTra	Performed by Masami Okui
Niji no Youni (Like a Rainbow)	Slayers NEXTra	Performed by Masami Okui
Process	Slayers EXTra	Performed by Masami Okui
Saikou no Gamble (Risky Gamble)	Slayers EXTRA	Performed by Masami Okui
Senjou no Madonna (Madonna of the Battlefield)	Slayers EXTRA	Performed by Masami Okui; Lyrics and composition by Masami Okui, arranged by Tsutomu Ōhira
Shakunetsu no Koi (Scorching Love)	Slayers EXTra	Performed by Megumi Hayashibara; Lyrics by Satomi Arimori, composed by Hidetoshi Satō, and arranged by Atsushi Onosawa

== Image songs ==
Song title	Character	Notes
Sekai Ichiban no Victory (The Best Victory in the World)	Amelia	Performed by Masami Suzuki (Slayers TV image song)
Stand up!	Amelia	Performed by Masami Suzuki (Slayers TRY image song); Lyrics by Chisa Tanabe, composition and arrangement by Shō Goshima
Otome no Inori (A Maiden's Prayer)	Amelia & Lina	Performed by Masami Suzuki and Megumi Hayashibara (Slayers NEXT - Episode #14); Lyrics & composition by Masami Okui
Uso no nai Game - Set Me Free (A Game Without Lies -Set Me Free)	Gourry	Performed by Yasunori Matsumoto (Slayers NEXT image song)
So in this World	Gourry	Performed by Yasunori Matsumoto (Slayers TRY); Lyrics by Satomi Arimori, composed by Hidetoshi Satō and arranged by Tsutomu Ōhira
Kono Sekai no Dokoka de	Filia	Performed by Houko Kuwashima (Slayers TRY); Japanese version of "Somewhere"
Somewhere	Filia	Performed by Houko Kuwashima (Slayers TRY); Lyrics, composition and arrangement by Chisa Tanabe
Exit -> Running	Lina	Performed by Megumi Hayashibara (Slayers TRY); Lyrics by Satomi Arimori, composed by Hidetoshi Satō and arranged by Shō Goshima
Shining Girl	Lina	Performed by Megumi Hayashibara (Slayers: Motion Picture); Lyrics by Satomi Arimori, composed by Hidetoshi Satō and arranged by Shō Goshima
Never Never Give Up	L.O.N	Performed by Kasumi Matsumura (Slayers TRY)
Brave Souls -Give a Reason-	L.O.N	Performed by Kasumi Matsumura (Slayers NEXT)
Power of Infinity	L.O.N	Performed by Kasumi Matsumura ()
Take Your Courage	L.O.N	Performed by Kasumi Matsumura (Slayers TRY); Lyrics by Megumi Ayukawa, composed by Hidetoshi Satō and arranged by Eiji Izomura
Ame no Far Away	Martina	Performed by Mifuyu Hiiragi (Slayers NEXT)
Datte Koishitara (When I'm in Love)	Martina	Performed by Mifuyu Hiiragi (Slayers NEXT)
Nō Aru Raibaru wa Tsume ō Kakusu!! (A Skilled Rival Conceals Her Claws)	Naga	Performed by Maria Kawamura (Slayers: Motion Picture)
Honki!! (Serious!!)	Naga	Performed by Maria Kawamura (Slayers RETURN)
Pink Typhoon	Naga	Performed by Maria Kawamura
Anata wa Takogo (You Speak the Octopus Language)	Ruma	Performed by Yuri Shiratori (Slayers Premium); Lyrics by Jun'ichi Satō, composition and arrangement by Hiroshi Imaizumi
Alone	Sylphiel	Performed by Yumi Touma (Slayers NEXT)
Fair Wind	Valgarv	Performed by Wataru Takagi (Slayers TRY); Hard rock, English version of "Breeze"
WARU -Bad Blood-	Valgarv	Performed by Wataru Takagi (Slayers TRY); Lyrics by Satomi Arimori, composition and arrangement by Hiroshi Imaizumi
But But But	Xellos	Performed by Akira Ishida (Slayers TRY); Lyrics and composition by Masami Okui, arranged by Itaru Watanabe
Secret ~dareka no message~ (Secret - Someone's Message)	Xellos	Performed by Akira Ishida (Slayers NEXT)
We Are..	Zelgadis	Performed by Hikaru Midorikawa (Slayers NEXT)
More Than Words	Zelgadis	Performed by Hikaru Midorikawa (Slayers TRY); Lyrics and composition by Masami Okui, arranged by Tsutomu Õhira
