= Successful Mission =

1996 single by Megumi Hayashibara

- 8-cm CD single cover

Single by Megumi Hayashibara

from the album Irāvatī
- Language: Japanese
- B-side: "I'll Be There"
- Released: October 23, 1996
- Genre: J-pop; anime song
- Length: 4:10
- Label: Starchild
- Composer: Hidetoshi Sato
- Lyricist: Megumi

Megumi Hayashibara singles chronology
"Just Be Conscious" (1996)	"Successful Mission" (1996)	"Don't Be Discouraged" (1997)

Audio
- "Successful Mission" on YouTube

"Successful Mission" is a song by Japanese voice actress and recording artist Megumi Hayashibara. Written by Hidetoshi Sato with lyrics penned by Hayashibara, (Note: Credited under her alias "Megumi" in all caps.) the song was released as a single on October 23, 1996, via Starchild.

== Background and release ==
"Successful Mission" was written as the opening theme song for the television anime series Saber Marionette J, in which Hayashibara voiced the main character, Lime. The anime was broadcast in Japan via TV Tokyo from October 1995 through January 1996. The song is characterized for its Eurobeat influence combined with heavy guitar use, a common feature of anime songs from that era.

For the single release, the song was coupled with "I'll Be There", which served as ending theme song for the same anime. The full-length versions of both tracks were first included on the Saber Marionette J soundtrack album Japanese Poem Anthology Collection Volume 2 released on April 9, 1997, and later on Hayashibara's studio album Irāvatī released on August 6, 1997. (Note: "I'll Be There" included as the re-arranged "ballade version.") "Successful Mission" was also used as opening theme of the PlayStation fighting game Saber Marionette J: Battle Sabers released by Bandai on March 28, 1997.

The original single was made available for streaming on March 30, 2021, along with the entire Megumi Hayashibara discography.

== Commercial performance ==
"Successful Mission" debuted and peaked at number 7 on the Oricon Singles chart, marking Hayashibara's second Top 10 entry on the Japanese charts since "Give a Reason." The single sold 66,450 copies on its first week and charted for seven weeks, with cumulative reported sales totalling 139,120 copies.

The single was certified Gold by the Recording Industry Association of Japan (RIAJ) in April 1997.

== Impact ==
Since its release, "Successful Mission" has become one of Hayashibara's signature songs, being described as a "classic, quintessential anime theme song" as well as a "legendary track in anime song history."

This track further boosted Megumi Hayashibara's mainstream popularity, leading to her being invited to perform the song live on the Nippon Television show Sokuhō! Uta no Daiji Ten in 1996, which marked her first appearance as a pop star on a TV music program.

== Cover versions ==
"Successful Mission" has been covered by various artists. Yoko Ishida first covered the song on her 2001 album Ultra Anime Eurobeat Series Para Para Max 5: The Power of New Animation Songs. Masami Okui recorded her own version of it on her 2003 cover album Masami Kobushi. Eizo Sakamoto and his heavy metal band Eizo Japan covered the song on their 2010 album Super Anime Song: Legend of the 1990s. Voice actress Kanae Itō recorded her own version of the song for the compilation album Shin Hyakka Seiran: Josei Seiyū Hen released that same year. Anime song group Trefle also recorded their own version of the song for their 2014 album Anison Shinkyoku Plus.

== Track listing and versions ==
All lyrics are written by Megumi; all music is composed by Hidetoshi Sato.

CD single/digital release track listing
No.	Title	Arrangement	Length
1.	"Successful Mission"	Toshiro Yabuki	5:34
2.	"I'll Be There"	Keiji Soeda	4:15
3.	"Successful Mission" (off vocal version)		5:34
4.	"I'll Be There" (off vocal version)		4:13

=== Official versions ===
- "Successful Mission" (TV size)
- "Successful Mission" (TV size - type II)
- "I'll Be There" (TV size)
- "I'll Be There" (Ballade version)

== Personnel ==
Credits adapted from the liner notes of the CD single.

- Megumi Hayashibara - vocals, lyrics, chorus
- Toshiro Yabuki - synthesizer programming, keyboards, guitars, mixing
- Gota Wakabayashi - guitar solo
- Masami Okui - chorus
- Hiroyuki Tsuji - recording
- Yuichi Nagayama - mixing

== Charts ==
=== Weekly charts ===
Weekly chart performance for "Successful Mission"
Chart (1996)	Peak position
Japan (Oricon)	7

=== Year-end charts ===
Year-end chart performance for "Successful Mission"
Chart (1996)	Position
Japan (Oricon)	199

== Certifications ==
Region	Certification	Certified units/sales
Japan (RIAJ)	Gold	200,000^{^}
^{^} Shipments figures based on certification alone.
