= Don't Be Discouraged =

1997 single by Megumi Hayashibara

- 8-cm CD single cover

Single by Megumi Hayashibara

from the album Feel Well
- Language: Japanese
- B-side: "Breeze"
- Released: April 23, 1997
- Genre: J-pop; anime song
- Length: 4:11
- Label: Starchild
- Composer: Hidetoshi Sato
- Lyricist: Megumi

Megumi Hayashibara singles chronology
"Successful Mission" (1996)	"Don't Be Discouraged" (1997)	"Reflection" (1997)

Audio
- "Don't Be Discouraged" on YouTube

"Don't Be Discouraged" (Note: Stylized in lower case on the Japanese release.) is a song by Japanese voice actress and recording artist Megumi Hayashibara. Written by Hidetoshi Sato with lyrics penned by Hayashibara, (Note: Under the alias "Megumi" stylized in all caps.) the song was released as a single on April 22, 2009, via Starchild.

It is one of Hayashibara's most popular singles, coming close to the commercial success of her earlier Slayers single "Give a Reason."

== Background and release ==
"Don't Be Discouraged" served as the ending theme for the television anime series Slayers Try, the third season of the Slayers franchise. For the single release, the song was coupled with "Breeze", which was used as opening theme for the same series. This became the first Slayers theme song single released by Hayashibara in which the lead track served as ending, as opposed to the opening theme for the series. Hayashibara wrote the lyrics for "Don't Be Discouraged," while Satomi Arimori—lyricist of the two previous opening themes for Slayers, "Get Along" and "Give a Reason"— wrote the lyrics for "Breeze."

Both "Don't Be Discouraged" and "Breeze" were first included on the compilation album Slayers Try Treasure Box released on June 21, 1997. The soundtrack album of Slayers Try released on August 21, 1997, included the TV-size versions, in addition to two previously-unreleased remixes of each track. "Don't Be Discouraged" was fist included on a solo album by Hayashibara in Feel Well released in 2002. As for "Breeze," the song was first included on a Hayashibara album in Plain released in 2007.

Both songs were included on Hayashibara's Slayers theme-song compilation albums Slayers Megumix (2008) and Slayers Megumixxx (2020), while only "Don't Be Discouraged" was included on Hayashibara's greatest hits albums Vintage White (2011) and Vintage Denim (2021).

The original single was made available for streaming worldwide on March 30, 2021, along with the entire Megumi Hayashibara discography.

== Commercial performance ==
"Don't Be Discouraged" achieved significant commercial success, debuting and peaking at number 4 on the Oricon charts, and selling 105,590 copies on its first week. Its first-week sales marked the first (and to date, only) instance of a voice actor's solo single surpassing the threshold of 100,000 copies on the Oricon charts. The single charted for eight weeks in total, with reported sales amounting to 211,340 copies. It is Hayashibara's second best-selling single to date after "Give a Reason," and it was also her highest-charting single until being surpassed by "Northern Lights" in 2002.

The single was certified gold by the Recording Industry Association of Japan in May 1997.

== Track listing ==
All music is composed by Hidetoshi Sato.

CD single/digital release track listing
No.	Title	Lyrics	Arrangement	Length
1.	"Don't Be Discouraged"	Megumi	Keiji Soeda	4:11
2.	"Breeze"	Satomi Arimori	Soeda	4:26
3.	"Don't Be Discouraged" (off vocal version)			4:11
4.	"Breeze" (off vocal version)			4:24

== Charts ==
=== Weekly charts ===
Weekly chart performance for "Don't Be Discouraged"
Chart (1997)	Peak position
Japan (Oricon)	4

=== Year-end charts ===
Year-end chart performance for "Don't Be Discouraged"
Chart (1997)	Position
Japan (Oricon)	135

== Certifications ==
Region	Certification	Certified units/sales
Japan (RIAJ)	Gold	200,000^{^}
^{^} Shipments figures based on certification alone.
