= Infinity (Megumi Hayashibara song) =

1998 single by Megumi Hayashibara

- 8-cm CD single cover

Single by Megumi Hayashibara

from the album Vintage S
- Language: Japanese
- B-side: "Extrication"
- Released: April 24, 1998
- Genre: J-pop; anime song
- Length: 4:30
- Label: Starchild
- Composer: Hidetoshi Sato
- Lyricist: Megumi

Megumi Hayashibara singles chronology
"Fine Colorday" (1998)	"Infinity" (1998)	"Raging Waves" (1998)

Audio
- "Infinity" on YouTube

"Infinity" (Note: Stylized as "〜infinity〜∞" on the Japanese release.) is a song by Japanese voice actress and recording artist Megumi Hayashibara. Written by Hidetoshi Sato with lyrics penned by Hayashibara (Note: under the alias "MEGUMI".), the song was released as a single on April 24, 1998, via Starchild.

== Background and release ==
The title track served as the opening theme for the TV Tokyo anime series Lost Universe created by Hajime Kanzaka, which happens in a world parallel to the one of Slayers. The anime, in which Hayashibara also voiced the character Canal Volphied, aired from April through September 1998 in Japan.

For the single release, the song was coupled with "Extrication", which served as ending theme for the same anime series. Both songs first appeared in full on the soundtrack album Lost Universe Tracks Contents 1 released on July 3, 1998, with subsequent Lost Universe albums including several alternative versions of the track. It was not included on any studio album by Hayashibara, but it was later included on her best-of album Vintage S, released on April 26, 2000.

The single was made available for streaming on March 30, 2021, along with the entire Megumi Hayashibara discography. The alternative versions of both "Infinity" and "Extrication" were made available for streaming by King Records on July 8, 2025, along with the entire Lost Universe discography.

== Commercial performance ==
"Infinity" debuted and peaked at number 8 on the Oricon charts, selling 64,040 copies on its first week. The single charted for nine weeks and sold a total of 141,510 copies, making it Hayashibara's fourth highest-selling single. Among her non-Slayers-related tie-in singles, it holds the top sales position.

== Cover versions ==
Voice actor Sōichirō Hoshi covered the song under the title "Re:Infinity" (Note: Stylized as "〜Re.infinity〜∞" on the Japanese release) on his 2007 single "Starting Again".

== Track listing and versions ==
CD single/digital release track listing
No.	Title	Lyrics	Music	Arrangement	Length
1.	"Infinity"	Megumi	Hidetoshi Sato	Keiji Soeda	4:30
2.	"Extrication"	Satomi Arimori	Toshiyuki Ōmori	Ōmori	4:39
3.	"Infinity" (off vocal version)				4:30
4.	"Extrication" (off vocal version)				4:36

=== Official versions ===
- "Infinity" (TV size)
- "Infinity" (Shooting Star mix)
- "Infinity" (Future Shock mix)
- "Infinity" (Red Zone mix)
- "Infinity" (instrumental version I)
- "Infinity" (instrumental version II)
- "Infinity" (instrumental version III)
- "Extrication" (TV size)
- "Extrication" (Freak Lounge mix)
- "Extrication" (Space Dub mix)
- "Extrication" (P.G.F.Perfumix)
- "Extrication" (instrumental version I)

== Charts ==
=== Weekly charts ===
Weekly chart performance for "Infinity"
Chart (1998)	Peak position
Japan (Oricon)	8

=== Year-end charts ===
Year-end chart performance for "Infinity"
Chart (1998)	Position
Japan (Oricon)	153
