= Get Along =

Get Along may refer to:

- "Get Along" (Megumi Hayashibara and Masami Okui song), from the anime series Slayers
- "Get Along" (Guy Sebastian song)
- "Get Along" (Kenny Chesney song)
- "Get Along", a song by Ou Est le Swimming Pool from The Golden Year
- Get Along (video album), a live DVD by Tegan and Sara
