= Midnight Blue (Megumi Hayashibara song) =

1995 single by Megumi Hayashibara

- 8-cm CD single cover

Single by Megumi Hayashibara

from the album Bertemu
- Language: Japanese
- B-side: "Shining Girl"
- Released: July 21, 1995
- Genre: J-pop; anime song
- Length: 5:34
- Label: Starchild
- Composer: Hidetoshi Sato
- Lyricist: Satomi Arimori

Megumi Hayashibara singles chronology
"Get Along" (1998)	"Midnight Blue" (1995)	"Going History" (1995)

Audio
- "Midnight Blue" on YouTube

"Midnight Blue" (stylized in all caps) is a song by Japanese voice actress and recording artist Megumi Hayashibara. Written by Hidetoshi Sato with lyrics penned by Satomi Arimori, the song was released as Hayashibara's single on July 21, 1995, via Starchild.

== Background and release ==
"Midnight Blue" became the first solo release by Hayashibara associated with the Slayers franchise. The title track served as theme song for Slayers The Motion Picture, which premiered in Japanese theatres on July 29, 1995. Although uncredited, voice actor Sōichirō Hoshi provides backing vocals on the track.

For its release, the song was coupled with "Shining Girl", which served as image song for the same movie.

Both songs were first included on the movie soundtrack released on September 6, 1995, and later on Hayashibara's studio album Bertemu released on November 1, 1996.

The single was made available for streaming on March 30, 2021, along with the entire Megumi Hayashibara discography. The soundtrack album of Slayers The Motion Picture featuring the song was made available for streaming worldwide on September 10, 2025.

== Critical reception ==
J-Pop Time Traveler described "Midnight Blue" as "a mysterious and powerful medium-tempo track that symbolizes the golden era of 90s anime songs." Jonathan Leiter of The Cinema Warehouse, described it as a "darker" track compared to the endings of later Slayers films, such as Slayers Return and Slayers Great, characterized for being lighter and more upbeat. Leiter commented that the song had "more grit," as well as a more “weird” angle compared to subsequent Slayers movie theme songs, with "a bit more rough, perhaps a slight bit more dated sounding with the particular synth sounds utilized in its answer section of the sort of question (lyric) answer (synth riff) sections of the chorus." Anime Fringe also gave a positive review on the song.

== Commercial performance ==
"Midnight Blue" debuted and peaked at number 27 on the Oricon charts, becoming Hayashibara's first Top 30 entry on the Japanese charts with 19,560 copies sold on its first week. The single charted for seven weeks, with cumulative reported sales totalling 71,550 copies.

== Track listing and versions ==
All lyrics are written by Satomi Arimori; all music is composed by Hidetoshi Sato.

CD single/digital release track listing
No.	Title	Arrangement	Length
1.	"Midnight Blue"	Shō Goshima	5:34
2.	"Shining Girl"	Goshima	4:15
3.	"Midnight Blue" (off vocal version)		5:34
4.	"Shining Girl" (off vocal version)		4:13

== Charts ==
Weekly chart performance for "Midnight Blue"
Chart (1995)	Peak position
Japan (Oricon)	27
