= Plenty of Grit =

Japanese song by Megumi Hayashibara

Single by Megumi Hayashibara

from the album Choice
- Language: Japanese
- A-side: "Revolution" (double A-side)
- Released: July 23, 2008
- Genre: J-pop; anime song
- Length: 4:49
- Label: Starchild
- Composer: Hidetoshi Sato
- Lyricist: Megumi

Megumi Hayashibara singles chronology
"A Happy Life" (2007)	"Plenty of Grit" / "Revolution" (2008)	"Front Breaking" (2009)

Audio
- "Plenty of Grit" on YouTube

"Plenty of Grit" is a song by Japanese voice actress and recording artist Megumi Hayashibara. Written by Hidetoshi Sato with lyrics penned by Hayashibara, (Note: Under the alias "Megumi" stylized in all caps.) the song released as a double A-side single alongside "Revolution" on July 23, 2008, by Starchild. Both songs were used as the opening and ending themes for the anime television series Slayers Revolution, respectively.

== Background ==
Slayers Revolution marked the return of the Slayers franchise to television anime after an 11-year hiatus since the conclusion of Try in 1997. Hayashibara, the voice actress for the protagonist Lina Inverse since the original series, reprised her role and was also deeply involved in the production and direction of the theme songs for the new series, drawing on her extensive knowledge of the franchise. For the opening theme "Plenty of grit", Hayashibara aimed to recreate the atmosphere of the earlier television series entries, and there aimed to regroup the original contributors of theme songs from the original 1990s series, which she aimed would serve as a nostalgic "tease" for longtime fans familiar with the old staff. She selected a composition by Hidetoshi Sato from nearly ten demo tapes, specifically choosing one where the intro prominently featured the word "Slayers" in a recognizable manner. The arrangement was handled by Tsutomu Ohira, who had previously worked on Slayers Next, while Masami Okui contributed with backing vocals. The anime began airing July 2, 2008, on TV Tokyo.

== Concepts and themes ==
The lyrics of "Plenty of Grit" reflect themes of perseverance, the inherent value of life despite setbacks, and inner strength. Hayashibara explained that both "Plenty of Grit" and "Revolution" address universal human experiences—doubt, discouragement, the desire to give up or curse one's circumstances—while affirming that life begins as a "win" simply by being born against incredible odds. Additionally, she expressed a desire to return the resilience and "grit" she had learned from the early years of Slayers, channeling it back into the franchise through the songs.

== Release ==
The CD single was released on July 23, 2008, following the June 2008 release of Slayers Megumix, a 29-track compilation album of Slayers-related songs curated by Hayashibara herself. Both "Plenty of Grit" and "Revolution" were later included on Hayashibara's fifteenth studio album Choice, released on July 21, 2010. "Plenty of grit" was also featured on Hayashibara's best-of album Vintage White, released on June 11, 2011.

Although it is treated as a double A-side ("Plenty of Grit/Revolution") in Oricon listings, on the Hayashibara's official site, as well as in promotional materials, advertisements, and other related sources, the single is actually listed a single A-side featuring "Plenty of grit" alone.

== Commercial performance ==
"Plenty of Grit" debuted and peaked at number 6 on the Oricon charts, selling 14,940 copies on its first week. The single charted for nine weeks in total, with reported sales amounting to 25,931 copies.

== Track listing ==
All lyrics are written by Megumi.

CD single/digital release track listing
No.	Title	Music	Arrangement	Length
1.	"Plenty of Grit"	Hidetoshi Sato	Tsutomu Ohira	4:49
2.	"Revolution"	Go Takahashi	Takahashi	4:18
3.	"Plenty of Grit" (Off Vocal Version)			4:49
4.	"Revolution" (Off Vocal Version)			4:16

== Personnel ==
Credits adapted from the liner notes of the CD single.

- Megumi Hayashibara – lead vocals, lyrics
- Tsutomu Ohira – programming, keyboard
- Toshiro Yabuki – guitar, mixing
- Masami Okui – chorus
- Satomi "Dark" Takahashi – chorus
- Hiroyuki Tsuji – recording engineer
- Toshimichi Otsuki – executive producer

== Charts ==
Weekly chart performance for "Plenty of Grit"
Chart (2008)	Peak position
Japan (Oricon)	6
Japan Top Singles Sales (Billboard Japan)	12
Japan Hot 100 (Billboard Japan)	71
