= Bertemu =

Studio album by Megumi Hayashibara
- Released: November 1, 1996
- Genre: J-Pop
- Length: 61:32
- Label: Starchild

Megumi Hayashibara chronology
Enfleurage (1995)	Bertemu (1996)	Irāvatī (1997)

Bertemu (stylized in lower case; Indonesian for 'meet, converge'; stylized in lower case) is the eighth studio album by Japanese voice actress and recording artist Megumi Hayashibara, released on November 1, 1996, by Starchild.

== Background and release ==
Many tracks on Bertemu originated as theme songs or insert songs from anime. Notable inclusions are "Give a Reason" (opening for Slayers Next); the Ayanami versions of "A Cruel Angel's Thesis" and "Fly Me to the Moon" associated with Neon Genesis Evangelion and its character Rei Ayanami, along with other anime-related or original material.

The album was issued in both a standard and a limited edition that included a cardboard sleeve and a hardcover photobook. It has been re-released on March 16, 2005. The album was often marketed at the time as her first "best-of album", though it includes many new recordings and alternate takes rather than being a pure compilation.

== Commercial performance ==
Bertemu peaked at number 3 on the Oricon weekly albums chart, making it Hayashibara's highest-charting studio album at the time. It charted for eight weeks and sold approximately 222,860 copies in Japan, earning a Gold certification from the Recording Industry Association of Japan in November 1996.

== Track list ==
No.	Title	Lyrics	Music	Arrangement	Length
1.	"Give a Reason"	Satomi Arimori	Hidetoshi Sato	Tsutomu Ohira	4:25
2.	"Touch Yourself"	Megumi Hayashibara	Sato	Keiji Soeda	5:06
3.	"Hanarete Ite mo" (はなれていても, lit. 'Even If We Are Apart')	Ritsuko Okazaki	Okazaki	Nobuyoshi Mitsumune	4:13
4.	"A Cruel Angel's Thesis" (Ayanami version)	Yuko Oikawa	Hidetoshi Sato	Toshiyuki O'mori	4:15
5.	"Midnight Blue"	Arimori	Sato	Sho Goto	5:31
6.	"Matsuri Uta" (まつりうた, lit. 'Festival Song')	Hayashibara	Kenji Kawai	Kawai	4:24
7.	"Shakunetsu no Koi" (灼熱の恋, lit. 'Scorching Love')	Arimori	Sato	Atsushi Onozawa	3:58
8.	"-Life-"	Okazaki	Okazaki	Masaki Iwamoto	4:04
9.	"Fly Me to the Moon" (Ayanami version)	Bart Howard	Howard	O'mori	4:31
10.	"Shining Girl"	Arimori	Sato	Goto	4:12
11.	"Nostalgic Lover"	Arimori	Mitsumune	Mitsumune	4:27
12.	"Too Late" (new version)	Miho Matsuba	Ohira	Ohira	4:31
13.	"Going History"	Arimori	Sato	Onozawa	4:32
14.	"Cherish Christmas"	Megumi	Mitsumune	Mitsumune	5:30
Total length:					61:32

== Charts ==
=== Weekly charts ===
Chart (1996)	Peak position
Japanese Albums (Oricon)	3

=== Year-end charts ===
Chart (1996)	Position
Japanese Albums (Oricon)	129

== Certifications ==
Region	Certification	Certified units/sales
Japan (RIAJ)	Gold	200,000
^{^} Shipments figures based on certification alone.
