= David Moo =

American actor

- Born: December 3, 1970 (age 55); Brookline, Massachusetts, United States
- Occupations: Voice actor; bartender; bar owner
- Years active: 1990s–present

David Benjamin Moo (born December 3, 1970) is an American former voice actor. He worked on projects for 4Kids Entertainment, Central Park Media, NYAV Post, and TAJ Productions. Moo is best known for voicing Sanji in the 4Kids English language dub of One Piece, Xellos in Slayers, and Faraji Ngala in several episodes of the 2003–2009 Teenage Mutant Ninja Turtles animated series.

== Biography ==
=== Personal life and career ===
Moo has Chinese, Jamaican, and Jewish ancestry and was previously an actor and theatre director in the 1990s. He began working as a voice actor in the late 1990s, primarily dubbing Japanese anime into English for local audiences.

Moo has also worked as a bartender, specializing in novelty cocktails since the early 2000s. He enjoys making Manhattans and a signature drink he calls "Alice's Mallet" made from gin and rhubarb syrup that he distills himself. He previously was a bartender at New York City establishments Ouest and Last Exit before co-founding Quarter Bar in 2007 with business partner Joe Herron. In 2016, Esquire magazine named Quarter Bar, located on the southern edge of Park Slope, one of the top 18 bars in the United States.

In January 2019, Moo appeared as a contestant on the quiz show Jeopardy! (Season 35, Episode 95), coming in second place out of the three contestants and winning $2,000.

== Filmography ==
- Giant Robo - Kaei (NYAV Post dub)
- The Gokusen - Sawada's Father
- Ichi the Killer - Episode 0 - Hirano
- Irresponsible Captain Tylor - Yamashita (OVA, Ep. 4)
- Kizuna: Bonds of Love - Masa (credited as Dominic Moore)
- Night on the Galactic Railroad - Wireless Operator
- Now and Then, Here and There - Additional Voices
- One Piece - Sanji (4Kids dub)
- Ping-Pong Club - Hide, Jinpei's Father, Kitazato, Mr. Kida, Tachikawa (credited as Dominic Moore)
- Shootfighter Tekken - Tayama
- Shura no Toki: Age of Chaos - Munefuyu Matajyuro Yagyu, Tenkai Nankoubo
- Silent Service - General Akegaki
- The Slayers - Xellos (Seasons 2 & 3)
- Takegami - Guardian of Darkness - Jiunbo
- Teenage Mutant Ninja Turtles (2003) - Faraji Ngala, Admin Wizard
- Yu-Gi-Oh! - Panik
- Yu-Gi-Oh! GX - Gravekeeper's Chief
