= Xellos =

Fictional character from the Slayers franchise

- Slayers character
- Xellos in Slayers volume 7: Gaav's Challenge
- First appearance: Slayers volume 5: The Silver Beast (1992)
- Created by: Hajime Kanzaka; Rui Araizumi
- Voiced by: Japanese Akira Ishida English David Moo (Next and Try) Kurt Stoll (Premium) Michael Sinterniklaas (Revolution and Evolution-R)

In-universe information
- Species: Mazoku

Xellos (Japanese: ゼロス, Hepburn: Zerosu) (sometimes spelled Xelloss) is a fictional character and a primary figure in the Slayers fantasy comedy light novel series and its manga, anime and other adaptations. He is a powerful mazoku demon, who is both a helpful and a hindrance character to the protagonist Lina Inverse and her friends. Xellos is the single most powerful servant of Zelas Metallium, who in turn is one of the five retainers of Ruby Eye Shabranigdo, one of the Slayers series' evil deity-like beings. Because of this relationship, some consider Xellos Metallium to be his full name, but he calls himself simply "Xellos, the Mysterious Priest".

== Character ==
Xellos behaves like a trickster, answering nearly all questions directed toward him with "Sore wa himitsu desu", literally "That is a secret." He enjoys the reactions that occur when he withholds information from others. For most of the second season, Xellos acts simply for comedy's sake, frequently breaking the fourth wall while subtly advancing the plot. Generally, Xellos' mood can be determined by the state of his eyes: if they are closed, he acts as the "Trickster Priest," but when he opens them, he reveals his dark nature.

Xellos' true intentions are a mystery. As a Mazoku, his main goal is to return the universe into the nothingness of the Sea of Chaos, but near the end of the third season, he helps Lina Inverse and the others save the world. Even though he tends to manipulate Lina and the others, he occasionally saves their lives, like rescuing Martina Zoana Mel Navratilova from bandits for no apparent reason and saving Filia during their battle with Valgaav. His reasons for doing so are never revealed. Xellos is extremely loyal to Zelas Metallium and usually acts only if ordered to do so, although at times he aided Lina's group without specific orders. Presumably, he would gladly follow any of her requests to keep her pleased, even if he is not pleased with them; for example, in Slayers TRY, he was ordered to offer to kill Lina Inverse if Valgaav joined the Mazoku side. In the novels, the Slayers group generally abhors his presence, while in the anime he is treated as a tolerable nuisance.

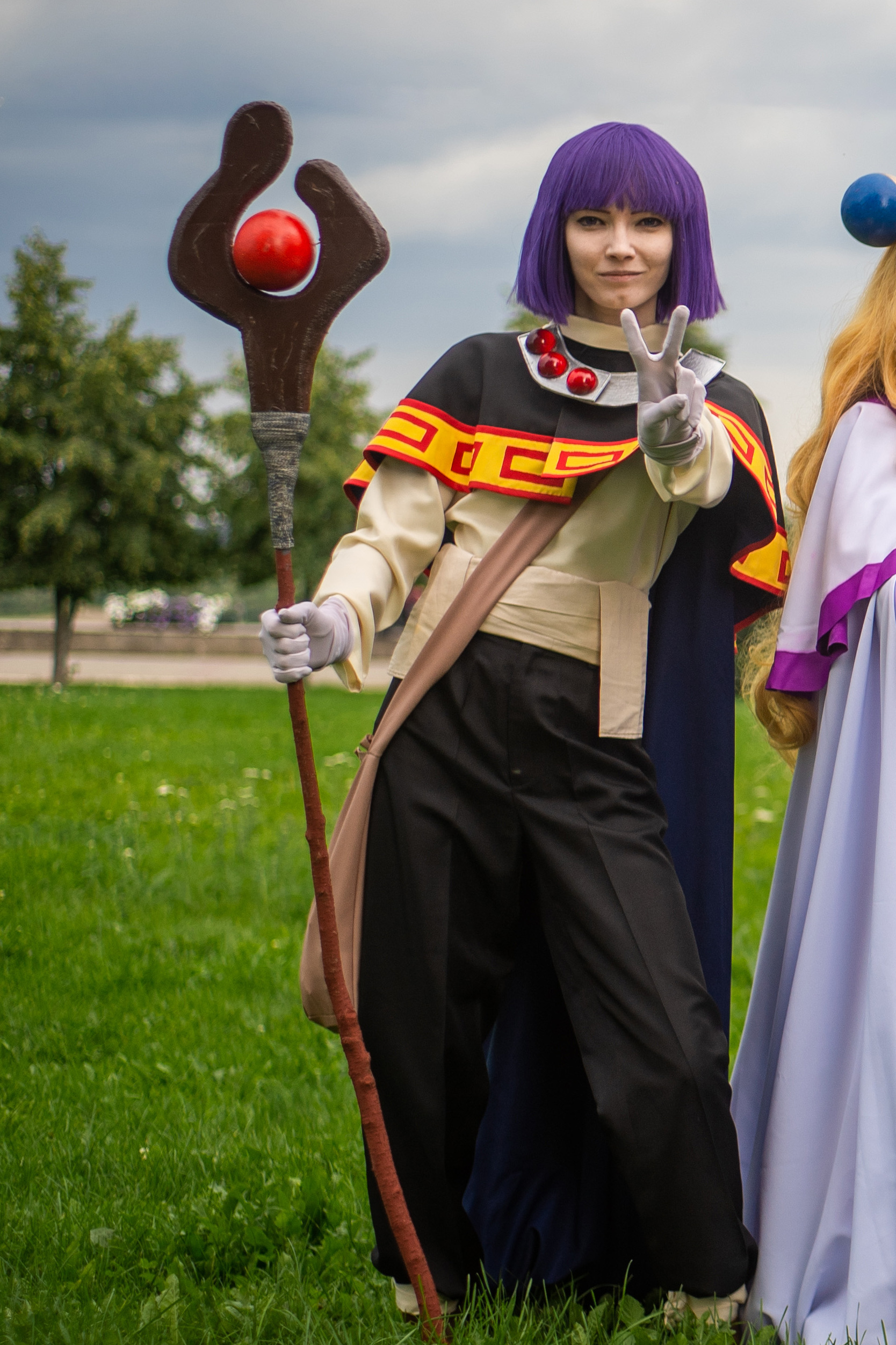
Xellos cosplay

In Slayers NEXT, the anime's second season, the antagonist Hellmaster Phibrizzo orders Xellos to follow Lina. While following Lina he occasionally helped but often hampered her quest to find the Claire Bible. During this time, he hides in the guise of a traveling priest, though he is revealed to be a Monster in the later episodes. In the climactic showdown with Gaav the demon dragon king, Xellos defends Lina and her friends from the attacks of Seigram and Gaav, while suffering a grievous wound. In the third season, Slayers TRY, Valgaav tries to summon Dark Star to the world of Ruby Eye. Xellos is sent to prevent the summoning. He helps Lina and her friends fight Valgaav and stop Dark Star from being released into their world. In the fourth and fifth seasons, his goal is to ascertain whether Red Priest Rezo's soul is the only item in the Hellmaster's Jar, or whether the piece of Shabranigdo killed in the first season was sealed with it. If so, he has to prevent the demon lord's shard from breaking free, due to the unforeseeable consequences such an irregular awakening might have.

Unlike most dark lords, who created one general and one priest, Zelas Metallium created a priest/general combo – Xellos. As the only Mazoku under Zelas' command, Xellos is extremely powerful. Lina's group is, therefore, cautious of his movements because if he were to become their enemy, their defeat would be almost certain. This is confirmed in Slayers Revolution when Xellos faces the entire Slayers party and comes out on top; during the fight, Lina states that even with all of them fighting him at full force, they would still lose. He is immune to most magic; nothing short of a direct hit from Lina's Ragna Blade or Gourry's Sword of Light can stun him, assuming that his enemies are fast enough to strike him in the first place. Like all monsters, Xellos can teleport by phasing into and out of the Astral Side, the realm of spiritual existence in the Slayers world. He uses this ability to his advantage in battle, blinking between the Physical and Astral planes like a strobe light to make his movements more confusing. Xellos can annihilate nearly anything using his own power (this is best shown by his destruction of an entire clan of Golden Dragons with a casual gesture). However, he tends to underestimate his opponents; he is, for example, severely beaten by Valgaav.

In the anime, Xellos and Lina seem to have mutual respect. He seems to enjoy the chaos that follows Lina and follows her for fun even when he is not ordered to do so, seeming somewhat fond of Lina, to the point of looking somewhat regretful when the Lord of Nightmares seemingly absorbs her. Lina also has comically beaten him when he gets them into trouble. In the novels, Xellos is more distant around her, somewhat troubled by the fact that Lina, unlike other humans he has dealt with, can see the bigger picture and is not easily manipulated. Zelgadis holds a powerful hatred towards the Mazoku because in the second episode of NEXT, Xellos destroys a Claire Bible manuscript, which the chimera thought might have contained the cure to his state. This does not bother Xellos, even though he is the only one who does not tease Zelgadis about his appearance. When Amelia makes one of her heroic speeches, Xellos often listens with amusement and mild curiosity, although they sometimes disturb him. When she expounds at length about how beautiful and wondrous the world and life are, Xellos becomes extremely weakened, even cringing at her minor comments. So great is the effect of these speeches on Xellos that when they are forced to fight him, the group uses one of them as a weapon to render him helpless. Even though Xellos tries to be polite to Filia, she continues to insult him and call him names like "raw garbage" (namagomi). Xellos likes to tease Filia because she is part of the dragon race. Her hatred towards him originates from the fact that he killed many dragons during the War of the Monsters' Fall 1,000 years in the Slayers universe's past. By the end of the series, they learn to tolerate each other and can have at least one conversation.

== Video games and merchandise ==
Perhaps due to his overpowered status, Xellos would not appear directly in any of Slayers video games for decades besides a China-only crossover collaboration event in Ragnarok M in 2021. However, Reid Hershel from Tales of Eternia could be dressed as him in Tales of the Rays. Xellos himself finally appeared as a playable character in Guardian Tales in 2022, and he was featured personally in Tales of the Rays in 2023 as well as in Elemental Story that same year. His physical merchandise have included figurines and perfume.

== Reception ==
While Xellos started as a single-arc character in the original novel series, his enormous popularity among readers (ranked first in at least one of the popularity polls, surpassing even the protagonist Lina Inverse) allowed him to be included in the last novel and all anime seasons following his introduction. Xellos placed fourth in Anime Grand Prix 1997 awards in the category best male character. Akemi's Anime World described him as one of the best characters in Slayers while Tom Tonthat from The Escapist called him "a key addition to the Slayers NEXT cast as the manipulative force steering Lina and company" and singling out the interactions between him and Filia as "the freshest comedic gems" of Slayers TRY.
