= Pulse (Megumi Hayashibara album) =

- 1994ver.

EP by Megumi Hayashibara
- Released: February 28, 1990; December 21, 1994
- Genre: J-pop
- Length: 16:37; 33:11（1994ver.）
- Label: Futureland

Megumi Hayashibara chronology
-	Pulse (1990)	Half and, Half (1991)

Pulse is an extended play by Japanese voice actress and recording artist Megumi Hayashibara, released on February 28, 1990. A re-released version was released in 1994, which included karaoke tracks of the songs. All four songs as well as re-recorded versions were included in Hayashibara's 2015 compilation album, Time Capsule.

== Track listing ==
=== Original version ===
No.	Title	Length
1.	"COME TRUE..."	3:30
2.	"Follow You, Follow Me"	4:15
3.	"GO ALONG! GO AROUND!!"	3:45
4.	"Yume wo Oikakete" (夢を追いかけて、Chase Your Dream)	5:07
Total length:		16:37

=== 1994 version ===
No.	Title	Length
1.	"COME TRUE..."	3:30
2.	"Follow You, Follow Me"	4:15
3.	"GO ALONG! GO AROUND!!"	3:45
4.	"Yume wo Oikakete" (夢を追いかけて、Chase Your Dream)	5:07
5.	"COME TRUE..." (Karaoke)	3:31
6.	"Follow You, Follow Me" (Karaoke)	4:14
7.	"GO ALONG! GO AROUND!!" (Karaoke)	3:45
8.	"Yume wo Oikakete" (夢を追いかけて、Chase Your Dream (Karaoke))	5:04
Total length:		33:11
