= Slayers (video game) =

1994 role-playing video game for the Super Famicom

- Developer(s): BEC
- Publisher(s): Banpresto
- Director(s): Mitsutoshi Kiyono
- Producer(s): "Jippahitokarage"; Hiroshi Ogawa; Mitsuo Matsuda
- Designer(s): Junichi Moriya; Hirotoshi Baba; Masato Takahashi
- Programmer(s): Masato Takahashi; Makoto Saeki
- Artist(s): Rui Araizumi; Hitoshi Mano; Hirotoshi Baba
- Writer(s): Hajime Kanzaka; Hirotoshi Baba; Hitoshi Mano
- Platform(s): Super Famicom
- Release: JP: June 24, 1994
- Genre(s): Role-playing video game
- Mode(s): Single-player

Slayers (スレイヤーズ, Sureiyāzu) is a role-playing video game adaptation of the Slayers light novel series developed by BEC and published by Banpresto for the Super Famicom (SNES) exclusively in Japan in 1994. Note that this game should not be confused with another "Slayers" game that was published by Banpresto for the NEC PC-9801 that same year.

== Gameplay ==
Battle gameplay in fan-translated English version (unofficial, 2010)

The game system is similar to the early Final Fantasy games and other classic Japanese role-playing games of that era. In the main part of the game, the protagonist and her party navigates different areas from a top-down perspective, much like in many other SNES games. When in an area, the player can call up a start menu to access items, perform healing spells, search the immediate area for hidden items, and such. The player can travel between different areas (towns, cities, forests and so on) via a world map.

During the battle, seen from a first-person view, the player can tell each character in their party to do one of six things: attack with a weapon, cast of one of the character's magic spells (for magic users), use a special technique that varies from character to character, give up the character's turn for higher defense, attempt to flee from a random encounter battles, or use one of the items from the inventory.

The player can have up to four characters (including the protagonist Lina Inverse) in their party. They include almost all hero characters from both the main novel series (Gourry Gabriev, Amelia, Zelgadiss, Sylphiel, etc.) and from the Slayers Special series (Naga the Serpent, Lemmy, etc.) as released at that time. For most of the game, the player has no control over who is or is not in their party, as characters will join and leave as the game's plot determines. After finishing the main game, the player can also select three characters (with the fourth still automatically assigned) to play in a bonus scenario.

== Plot ==
The game, released about a year before the first season of the first anime series, follows the light novels' continuity. Many characters from the Slayers Special novels are present. When introducing the manga Slayers: Knight of Aqualord, Slayers creator and the game's co-writer Hajime Kanzaka described several of the alternative continuities across mediums, mentioning this game as one of them taking place after the first arc of the novel series, namely after the eighth novel.

The game begins with a man finding an unconscious Lina Inverse and taking her back to his village. It quickly becomes clear that Lina has lost all her memories: she does not know who she is, or how to cast any but the most basic spells. Most of the game follows her adventures across different locations in the Slayers world. Gradually, Lina regains her spellcasting abilities and reunites with old friends and acquaintances from the novels. Eventually, Lina and her companions learn that the Greater Beast Zelas Metallium has been creating copies of her. When Lina, Gourry, Amelia and Zelgadiss confront Zelas, they learn that the reason Lina has lost her memories is that she is, in fact, one of the copies Zelas created; the real Lina is being held prisoner by Zelas. After defeating her, the original Lina is freed.

At this point, the main story is over, but the game can be continued. The player picks a new name for Copy Lina, and can go on a quest to find and defeat Lei Magnus-Shabranigdu. All characters who have been in the player's party will congregate at an inn in Tells City, enabling to freely pick three characters to re-join the party. Once Lei Magnus-Shabranigdu is slain, the game is officially over.

== Reception ==
Slayers was Japan's #3 best-selling SNES game during July 1994.

== See also ==
- List of Slayers video games
