= Jikū Tantei DD: Maboroshi no Rōrerai =

1996 video game

- Sega Saturn cover art
- Publisher: ASCII Corporation
- Writer: Hideki Sonoda
- Platforms: PlayStation, Sega Saturn
- Release: JP: July 26, 1996
- Genre: Adventure
- Mode: Single-player

Jikū Tantei DD: Maboroshi no Rōrerai (Note: Japanese: 時空探偵ＤＤ ～幻のローレライ～; lit. 'Space-Time Detective DD: Phantom Lorelei') is a 1996 adventure video game published by ASCII Corporation for the PlayStation and Sega Saturn only in Japan.

== Gameplay and plot ==
Jikū Tantei DD: Maboroshi no Rōrerai is a single-player adventure game. The main character provides advice on how to progress through the game through monologues.

The game features Narugami Raizo, a vampire who can freely travel via a time machine. The game begins in Germany in 1939, where he must find a missing doctor on an airship.

== Development ==
The scenario of the game is by Hideki Sonoda, who worked in anime television series such as Mobile Suit Victory Gundam. Among the voice actors in the game is Megumi Hayashibara who sings the game's ending theme song and plays Maria Helsing.

ASCII Corporation was preparing to release the game along with the other three at the same time. By March 1995, the game was 60% complete, and by May 14, 1996, it was 75% complete.

== Release and reception ==
Reception

Review scores
Publication	Score	
Publication	PS	Saturn
Famitsu	6/10, 7/10, 7/10, 7/10	6/10, 7/10, 6/10, 7/10
Sega Saturn Magazine		7/10, 4/10, 5/10

Jikū Tantei DD: Maboroshi no Rōrerai was released for the Sega Saturn and PlayStation in Japan on July 26, 1996. Reviewers in Famicom Tsūshin found the only difference between the versions was higher-quality graphics in the PlayStation version.

Some reviewers in Sega Saturn Magazine and Famicom Tsūshin complimented the graphics and voice acting as highlights of the game, with one reviewer in the latter magazine saying the lavishly animated cutscenes are worth watching at least once. One reviewer in Sega Saturn Magazine found the characters too "doll-like" and unappealing, while another said they looked stiff in comparison to the tone of the voice-actors.

Reviewers found the gameplay to be quite passive, as the story was linear and the first disc of the game on the PlayStation was entirely demo scenes and cutscenes and the opening scene was over 30 minutes long. One reviewer in both magazines found the controls sluggish, with one saying it was frustrating to move the character backwards by having to press left or right twice to turn around.

The magazine reviewers found the game either dated, such as having to talk to the same person three times to move forward, or having unchallenging puzzles. Reviewers in these magazines ranged from finding the story enjoyable and immersive to finding it cliché. One reviewer questioned why the main character was a vampire, as it rarely came up in the story.
