= Megumi Hayashibara =

Japanese voice actress, singer, and radio personality (born 1967)

- 林原 めぐみ
- Born: March 30, 1967 (age 59); Kita, Tokyo, Japan
- Other name: MEGUMI
- Occupations: Voice actress; singer; lyricist; radio personality
- Years active: 1986–present
- Agent: Woodpark Office
- Notable credits: Neon Genesis Evangelion as Rei Ayanami and Yui Ikari; Slayers as Lina Inverse; Hello Kitty as Hello Kitty; Detective Conan as Ai Haibara; Ranma ½ as Ranma Saotome (female and child); Cowboy Bebop as Faye Valentine; Pokémon as Musashi/Jessie and various Pokémon; Saber Marionette J as Lime; Magical Princess Minky Momo (1991) as Minky Momo of Marinarsa; Mashin Hero Wataru series as Himiko Shinobibe; Sailor Moon Cosmos as Sailor Galaxia; Shaman King As Anna Kyoyama
- Children: 1

Japanese name
- Hiragana: はやしばら めぐみ
- Katakana: ハヤシバラ メグミ
Transcriptions
- Romanization: Hayashibara Megumi
- Website: king-cr.jp/artist/hayashi/index.html

Megumi Hayashibara (林原 めぐみ, Hayashibara Megumi; born March 30, 1967) is a Japanese voice actress, singer, lyricist and radio personality from Kita ward in Tokyo and is affiliated with self-founded Woodpark Office. One of the most prominent Japanese voice actresses since the 1990s, Hayashibara is best known for her roles in Neon Genesis Evangelion, Saber Marionette J, Magical Princess Minky Momo, Mashin Hero Wataru, Ranma ½, Cowboy Bebop, Slayers, Detective Conan, Pokémon, All Purpose Cultural Catgirl Nuku Nuku, Hello Kitty, Video Girl Ai, and Shaman King for which she also performed various OP and ED themes in both the 2001 and 2021 adaptations.

== Biography ==
Hayashibara was born on March 30, 1967, in Kita Tokyo, Japan. She studied at a Catholic school and at one point was bullied in fifth grade. She was an active club member and participated in the Badminton, Biology, Broadcasting, Drama and English clubs. She played the role of Alice in an English language production of Alice in Wonderland. Despite qualifying as a nurse, she has never been employed in a nursing position.

On March 30, 1998, Hayashibara got married. On January 10, 2004, Hayashibara announced on her radio show that she was pregnant with her first child. On June 28 of the same year, she gave birth to her daughter via caesarian section.

=== Voice acting ===
On the same day as submitting the application for nursing school, Hayashibara went to a book store and found an advert offering free anime voice acting auditions at Arts Vision. Several months after submitting a demo tape, she received a confirmation of passing the first stage of the audition, and eventually decided to continue training as a nurse while doing voice acting. In 1986, after a year of voice actor training, Hayashibara was chosen to voice small roles on Maison Ikkoku. Initially, she had difficulty with her lines and had to redo many lines after the main recording sessions. Hayashibara later auditioned for Ranma ½ expecting to be cast as Akane Tendo, but was cast as the female half of Ranma Saotome instead. In 1993 and 1995, Hayashibara was a guest at Anime America. At the 1995 event, she decided to give a speech in English after believing the translation at the 1993 event did not reflect what she had said. In 1995, Hayashibara provided the voice of Rei Ayanami in Neon Genesis Evangelion, a role referred to as "innovative casting".

In addition to voicing Jessie of Team Rocket in Pokémon, Hayashibara has also voiced Ash's Pidgeotto and Pidgeot, May's Skitty, Whitney's Miltank, Clair's Dratini and Dragonair, Latios, Latias, and Anabel's Espeon in both the Japanese and English-language versions of the anime. She also provides the voice for Ai Haibara in the ongoing anime series, Detective Conan.

While Hayashibara rarely voices male characters, she voiced as Shuichi Saihara in Danganronpa V3: Killing Harmony due to her deep and vast experience connected to detective characters. She has actually helped the team on making Shuichi more detective-like.

In 2001, Hayashibara was cast as Anna Kyoyama in the anime adaptation of the shonen series Shaman King, while also performing the opening themes "Over Soul" and "Northern Lights". Twenty years later she reprised her role as Anna in the 2021 remake and performed the first opening theme, "Soul Salvation", and the first ending theme, "Boku no Yubisaki". "Over Soul" was used as the credits song for episode 5. Hayashibara's 2010 song "Osorezan Revoir" would also be used as the ending theme of episode 33, which concluded the Osorezan Revoir arc of the story.

=== DJ ===
While at nursing school, Hayashibara started a temporary job as a DJ at a local ice skating rink. After becoming better known as a voice actress, she was given her own radio show, Heartful Station. After 17 shows, the broadcasting station cancelled the show and other anime related programming to concentrate on traditional music. However, six months later, Hayashibara started a new radio show at another broadcaster.

=== Writing ===
Hayashibara wrote a series of manga for Anime V magazine, with artwork by Sakura Asagi. The comics, known as "Megumi-Toons", talked about her personal life and career. The individual chapters were collected into the book Ashita ga aru sa (明日があるさ, "There is always Tomorrow"), which has been reprinted several times. Hayashibara has also contributed two columns to Newtype magazine; Aitakute Aitakute, and Speaking in Character. Aitakute Aitakute is a series of interviews conducted by Hayashibara with people from all walks of life. Three compilations of the column have been published. Speaking in Character has been translated into English for Newtype USA.

In February 2021, Yen Press announced the release of Hayashibara's memoir The Characters Taught Me Everything: Living Life One Episode at a Time, in which she examines her career and the ways the characters she portrayed in various anime series affected it. The book is currently available for digital release, with the physical release slated for August 2021.

== Filmography ==
=== Television animation ===
| Year | Title | Role | Notes | Ref |
|---|---|---|---|---|
| 1986 | Maison Ikkoku | Various roles | | |
| 1988 | Osomatsu-kun | Todomatsu | | |
| 1988 | Mashin Hero Wataru | Himiko Shinobibe | | |
| 1988 | Moeru! Oniisan | Kaede | | |
| 1989 | Chinpui | Eri Kasuga | | |
| 1989 | City Hunter | Misuzu | | |
| 1989 | Alfred J. Kwak | Alfred J. Kwak | | |
| 1989 | Madō King Granzort | Guriguri; Enuma | | |
| 1989 | Patlabor: The TV Series | Momoko Sakurayama | | |
| 1989 | Ranma ½ | Ranma Saotome (female and childhood) | | |
| 1989 | Tenkuu Senki Shurato | Naraou Renge | | |
| 1990 | Idol Angel Yokoso Yoko | Saki Yamamori | | |
| 1990 | Kyatto Ninden Teyandee | Chomoranma #1/2 | | |
| 1990 | Heisei Tensai Bakabon | Bakabon | | |
| 1991 | Kinkyū Hasshin Saver Kids | Seira | | |
| 1991 | Magical Princess Minky Momo | Minky Momo | Second series | |
| 1991 | Zettai Muteki Raijin-Oh | Yū Izumi, Ruruko Himeki, Falzeb, Kozue Yamaguchi, Asuka's mother, Yoppā's mother | | |
| 1992 | Flanders no Inu, Boku no Patrasche | Nero | | |
| 1992 | Floral Magician Mary Bell | Mory | | |
| 1992 | Tekkaman Blade | Aki Kisaragi | | |
| 1992 | YuYu Hakusho | Genkai (young) | | |
| 1993 | Nekketsu Saikyo Gozaurer | Hiromi Tachibana, Erika Kozu, Harue Yamamoto | | |
| 1994 | Blue Seed | Momiji Fujimiya | | |
| 1994 | Christmas in January | Mizuki Tateno | | |
| 1994 | DNA² | Tomoko Saeki | | |
| 1994 | Macross Plus | Lucy McMillan | | |
| 1994 | Tico of the Seven Seas | Nanami Simpson | | |
| 1995 | Neon Genesis Evangelion | Rei Ayanami, Yui Ikari, Penpen, Unit 01 | | |
| 1995 | Slayers | Lina Inverse | | |
| 1995 | Sorcerer Hunters | Tira Misu | | |
| 1996 | Detective Conan | Shiho Miyano (Ai Haibara) | | |
| 1996 | Slayers Next | Lina Inverse | | |
| 1996 | Saber Marionette J | Lime | | |
| 1997 | Pokémon | Musashi (Jessie), Rumika (Jessiebelle), Mutsuko (Cindy), Satoshi's Fushigidane (Ash's Bulbasaur), Satoshi's Pigeon (Ash's Pidgeotto), Satoshi's Pigeot (Ash's Pidgeot) | | |
| 1997 | Saber Marionette J Again | Lime | | |
| 1997 | Slayers Try | Lina Inverse | | |
| 1997 | The Puzzling Challenge Letter of the Mysterious Thief Dorapan | Wang Dora | | |
| 1998 | All Purpose Cultural Cat Girl Nuku Nuku TV | Atsuko Natsume | | |
| 1998 | Cowboy Bebop | Faye Valentine | | |
| 1998 | Cyber Team in Akihabara | Tsubame Otorii | | |
| 1998 | Lost Universe | Canal Vorfeed | | |
| 1998 | Saber Marionette J to X | Lime | | |
| 1998 | Shadow Skill | Elle Regu | | |
| 1999 | Pokémon: Adventures on the Orange Islands | Musashi (Jessie), Satoshi's Fushigidane (Ash's Bulbasaur), Satoshi's Pigeon/Pidgeot (Ash's Pidgeotto/Pidgeot) | | |
| 1999 | Pokémon: The Johto Journeys | Musashi (Jessie), Satoshi's Fushigidane (Ash's Bulbasaur), Satoshi's Gomazou (Ash's Phanpy), Akane's Miltank (Whitney's Miltank), Ibuki's Miniryu/Hakuryu (Clair's Dratini/Dragonair), Silver | | |
| 1999 | Starship Girl Yamamoto Yohko | Madoka Midou | | |
| 2000 | Love Hina | Haruka Urashima | | |
| 2000 | Mewtwo! I Am Here | Musashi (Jessie), Satoshi's Fushigidane (Ash's Bulbasaur), Pikachutwo | | |
| 2000 | Invincible King Tri-Zenon | Kana Uryuu | | |
| 2001 | Shaman King | Anna Kyoyama, Opacho | | |
| 2001 | Tales of Eternia: The Animation | Marone Bluecarno | | |
| 2002 | Cheeky Angel | Megumi Amatsuka | | |
| 2002 | Panyo Panyo Di Gi Charat | Piyoko | | |
| 2002 | Pokémon Chronicles | Musashi (Jessie), Satoshi's Fushigidane (Ash's Bulbasaur), Satoshi's Gomazou (Ash's Phanpy) | | |
| 2002 | Pokémon: Advanced Generation | Musashi (Jessie), Hoenn Pokédex, Satoshi's Fushigidane (Ash's Bulbasaur), Satoshi's Gomazou (Ash's Phanpy), Takeshi's Mizugorou (Brock's Mudkip), Kasumi's Ruriri (Misty's Azurill), Haruka's Eneco (May's Skitty), Haruka's Eievui (May's Eevee) | | |
| 2003 | Di Gi Charat Nyo! | Piyoko | | |
| 2003 | Hitsuji no Uta | Chizuna Takashiro | | |
| 2005 | The Law of Ueki | Haruko Ueki | | |
| 2004 | Sergeant Keroro | Rei Kinoshita | Ep. 48 | |
| 2006 | The Mastermind of Mirage Pokémon | Musashi (Jessie) | | |
| 2006 | Pokémon: Diamond and Pearl | Musashi (Jessie), Satoshi's Fushigidane (Ash's Bulbasaur), Satoshi's Hikozaru (Ash's Chimchar), Haruka's Glacia (May's Glaceon) | | |
| 2006 | Hello Kitty: Ringo no Mori no Fantasy | Hello Kitty | | |
| 2008 | Slayers Revolution | Lina Inverse | | |
| 2009 | Slayers Evolution-R | Lina Inverse | | |
| 2010 | Pocket Monsters: Best Wishes! | Musashi (Jessie), Satoshi's Tsutarja (Ash's Snivy), Cabernet's Futachimaru (Burgundy's Dewott), Joy's Tabunne (Nurse Joy's Audino) | | |
| 2010 | Rainbow: Nisha Rokubō no Shichinin | Narrator | | |
| 2011 | Blue Exorcist | Yuri Egin | | |
| 2012 | Pocket Monsters: Best Wishes! Season 2 | Musashi (Jessie), Satoshi's Tsutarja (Ash's Snivy), Cabernet's Futachimaru (Burgundy's Dewott), Joy's Tabunne (Nurse Joy's Audino) | | |
| 2013 | Chihayafuru 2 | Midori Sakurazawa | | |
| 2013 | Pokémon: Black & White: Adventures in Unova | Musashi (Jessie), Satoshi's Fushigidane (Ash's Bulbasaur), Satoshi's Pigeon (Ash's Pidgeotto), Satoshi's Tsutarja (Ash's Snivy), Joy's Tabunne (Nurse Joy's Audino) | | |
| 2013 | Pokémon: Black & White: Adventures in Unova and Beyond | Musashi (Jessie), Satoshi's Fushigidane (Ash's Bulbasaur), Satoshi's Tsutarja (Ash's Snivy), Joy's Tabunne (Nurse Joy's Audino) | | |
| 2013 | Pocket Monsters: XY | Musashi (Jessie), Serena's Fokko/Tairenar (Serena's Fennekin/Braixen), Florges | | |
| 2014 | Insufficient Direction | Ronpāsu | | |
| 2014 | Magic Kaito 1412 | Ai Haibara | | |
| 2014 | One Piece | Rebecca | | |
| 2014 | Wildernuts | Ludo | | |
| 2014 | Space Dandy | Pine-Pine | | |
| 2014 | Sword Art Online II | Kyouko Yuuki/Erika | | |
| 2014 | Cross Ange | Sophia Ikaruga Misurugi | | |
| 2015 | Pocket Monsters: XY&Z | Musashi (Jessie), Serena's Tairenar (Serena's Braixen), Florges | | |
| 2016 | Shōwa Genroku Rakugo Shinjū | Miyokichi | | |
| 2016 | Ushio and Tora | Hakumen no Mono | | |
| 2016 | Sengoku Chōjū Giga | Narrator | | |
| 2016 | Pocket Monsters: Sun & Moon | Musashi (Jessie), Satoshi's Fushigidane (Ash's Bulbasaur), Satoshi's Mokuroh (Ash's Rowlet), Satoshi's Iwanko (Ash's Rockruff) | | |
| 2017 | Onihei Hankachō | Ofusa | Episode 2 | |
| 2017 | The Dragon Dentist | Shibana Natsume | | |
| 2017 | Rin-ne | Otome Rokudō | | |
| 2018 | FLCL Progressive | Haruha Raharu | | |
| 2018 | Karakuri Circus | Shirogane (Éléonore) Saiga, Francine, Angelina Saiga, Doll Francine, Fake Doll Francine | | |
| 2019 | Carole & Tuesday | Flora | | |
| 2019 | Pokémon Journeys: The Series | Musashi (Jessie), Goh's Scorbunny/Raboot/Cinderace | | |
| 2020 | Ghost in the Shell: SAC 2045 | Takashi Shimamura | | |
| 2021 | Shaman King (2021) | Anna Kyoyama, Opacho | | |
| 2021 | Irina: The Vampire Cosmonaut | Irina Luminesk | | |
| 2022 | Detective Conan: The Culprit Hanzawa | Ai Haibara | | |
| 2022 | Reiwa no Di Gi Charat | Piyocola Analogue III | | |
| 2024 | Ranma ½ | Ranma Saotome (female) | | |
| 2025 | Lazarus | Hersch | | |
| 2026 | Jujutsu Kaisen | Kaori Itadori | | |

=== Original video animation (OVA) ===
| Year | Title | Role(s) | Notes | Ref |
|---|---|---|---|---|
| 1989 | Mobile Suit Gundam 0080: War in the Pocket | Christina Mackenzie | | |
| 1989 | Riding Bean | Carrie | | |
| 1991 | 3×3 Eyes | Pai Ayanokoji/Sanjiyan Unkara | | |
| 1992 | Video Girl Ai | Ai Amano | | |
| 1992 | Bannō Bunka Nekomusume | Atsuko 'Nuku Nuku' Natsume | | |
| 1993 | Bad Boys | Kumi Yoshimoto | | |
| 1994 | Minky Momo: Tabidachi no Eki | Momo | | |
| 1994 | Tekkaman Blade II | Aki | | |
| 1994 | Macross Plus | Lucy Macmillan | | |
| 1995 | 3×3 Eyes Seima Densetsu | Pai | | |
| 1995 | Saber Marionette R | Lime | | |
| 1996 | Starship Girl Yamamoto Yohko | Madoka Midou | | |
| 1996 | Blue Seed 2 | Momiji Fujimiya | | |
| 1996 | Slayers Specials | Lina Inverse | | |
| 1996 | Shadow Skill | Elle Ragu | | |
| 1996 | Bakuretsu Hunters | Tira Misu | | |
| 1997 | Starship Girl Yamamoto Yohko II | Madoka Midou | | |
| 1997 | Saber Marionette J Again | Lime | | |
| 1998 | Queen Emeraldas | Hiroshi Umino | | |
| 1998 | All Purpose Cultural Cat-Girl Nuku Nuku DASH! | Atsuko Higuchi | | |
| 1998 | Slayers Excellent | Lina Inverse | | |

=== Anime films ===
| Year | Title | Role(s) | Notes | Ref |
|---|---|---|---|---|
| 1986 | Project A-ko | Ume | | |
| 1986 | Castle in the Sky | Woman wearing blue clothing | As cited in the original Japanese credits | |
| 1990 | Hello Kitty no Oyayubi-hime | Hello Kitty | | |
| 1991 | Hello Kitty no Mahō no Mori no Ohime-sama | Hello Kitty | | |
| 1992 | Hashire Melos! | Clair | | |
| 1994 | Sailor Moon S: The Movie | Himeko Nayotake | | |
| 1995 | Doraemon: Nobita's Diary of the Creation of the World | Bidano, Nobiko, Nonbi | | |
| 1995 | Slayers The Motion Picture | Lina Inverse | | |
| 1996 | Slayers Return | Lina Inverse | | |
| 1996 | Dorami & Doraemons: Robot School's Seven Mysteries!? | Wang Dora | | |
| 1996 | Tenchi Muyo! in Love | Achika Masaki | | |
| 1997 | Elmer's Adventure: My Father's Dragon | Boris the Dragon | | |
| 1997 | The Doraemons: The Puzzling Challenge Letter of the Mysterious Thief Dorapin! | Wang Dora | | |
| 1997 | Neon Genesis Evangelion: Death & Rebirth | Rei Ayanami | | |
| 1997 | Slayers Great | Lina Inverse | | |
| 1997 | The End of Evangelion | Rei Ayanami | | |
| 1998 | The Doraemons: The Great Operating of Springing Insects! | Wang Dora | | |
| 1998 | Pokémon: The First Movie | Musashi (Jessie), Satoshi's Fushigidane (Ash's Bulbasaur), Pikachutwo | | |
| 1998 | Slayers Gorgeous | Lina Inverse | | |
| 1999 | Pokémon: The Movie 2000 | Musashi (Jessie), Satoshi's Fushigidane (Ash's Bulbasaur) | | |
| 1999 | Cardcaptor Sakura: The Movie | Madoushi | | |
| 1999 | Detective Conan: The Last Magician of the Century | Ai Haibara | | |
| 2000 | Crayon Shin Chan | Chris the Cowboy Girl | | |
| 2000 | The Doraemons: Doki Doki Wildcat Engine! | Wang Dora | | |
| 2000 | Detective Conan: Captured in Her Eyes | Ai Haibara | | |
| 2000 | Pokémon 3: The Movie | Musashi (Jessie), Satoshi's Fushigidane (Ash's Bulbasaur) | | |
| 2001 | Detective Conan: Countdown to Heaven | Ai Haibara | | |
| 2001 | Dorami & Doraemons: Space Land's Critical Event! | Wang Dora | | |
| 2001 | Cowboy Bebop: The Movie | Faye Valentine | | |
| 2001 | Clockwork Island Adventure | Honey Queen | | |
| 2001 | Pokémon 4Ever | Musashi (Jessie) | | |
| 2001 | Slayers Premium | Lina Inverse | | |
| 2001 | Vampire Hunter D: Bloodlust | Leila | | |
| 2001 | Di Gi Charat - A Trip to the Planet | Piyoko | | |
| 2002 | Detective Conan: The Phantom of Baker Street | Ai Haibara | | |
| 2002 | Pokémon Heroes | Musashi (Jessie), Latias | | |
| 2003 | Detective Conan: Crossroad in the Ancient Capital | Ai Haibara | | |
| 2003 | Pokémon: Jirachi Wish Maker | Musashi (Jessie), Absol | | |
| 2004 | Detective Conan: Magician of the Silver Sky | Ai Haibara | | |
| 2004 | Pokémon: Destiny Deoxys | Musashi (Jessie), Takeshi's Mizugorou (Brock's Mudkip), Haruka's Eneco (May's Skitty) | | |
| 2004 | Doraemon: Nobita in the Wan-Nyan Spacetime Odyssey | Ichi/Hachi | | |
| 2005 | Detective Conan: Strategy Above the Depths | Ai Haibara | | |
| 2005 | Lupin the 3rd: Crisis in Tokyo | Maria | | |
| 2005 | Pokémon: Lucario and the Mystery of Mew | Musashi (Jessie), Satoshi's Gomazou (Ash's Phanpy), Takeshi's Mizugorou (Brock's Mudkip) | | |
| 2006 | Detective Conan: The Private Eyes' Requiem | Ai Haibara | | |
| 2006 | Paprika | Doctor Atsuko "Paprika" Chiba | | |
| 2006 | Pokémon Ranger and the Temple of the Sea | Musashi (Jessie) | | |
| 2007 | Detective Conan: Jolly Roger in the Deep Azure | Ai Haibara | | |
| 2007 | Evangelion: 1.0 You Are (Not) Alone | Rei Ayanami | | |
| 2007 | Highlander: The Search for Vengeance | Kyala | | |
| 2007 | Pokémon: The Rise of Darkrai | Musashi (Jessie) | | |
| 2008 | Detective Conan: Full Score of Fear | Ai Haibara | | |
| 2008 | Pokémon: Giratina and the Sky Warrior | Musashi (Jessie), Satoshi's Hikozaru (Ash's Chimchar) | | |
| 2009 | Evangelion: 2.0 You Can (Not) Advance | Rei Ayanami | | |
| 2009 | Pokémon: Arceus and the Jewel of Life | Musashi (Jessie) | | |
| 2009 | Detective Conan: The Raven Chaser | Ai Haibara | | |
| 2010 | Mardock Scramble: The First Compression | Rune Balot | | |
| 2010 | Pokémon: Zoroark: Master of Illusions | Musashi (Jessie) | | |
| 2010 | Detective Conan: The Lost Ship in the Sky | Ai Haibara | | |
| 2011 | Mardock Scramble: The Second Combustion | Rune Balot | | |
| 2011 | Pokémon the Movie: White—Victini and Zekrom | Musashi (Jessie) | | |
| 2011 | Pokémon the Movie: Black—Victini and Reshiram | Musashi (Jessie) | | |
| 2011 | Detective Conan: Quarter of Silence | Ai Haibara | | |
| 2012 | Asura | Wakasa | | |
| 2012 | Evangelion: 3.0 You Can (Not) Redo | Rei Ayanami (Tentative Name) | | |
| 2012 | Giant God Warrior Appears in Tokyo | Narrator | | |
| 2012 | Mardock Scramble: The Third Exhaust | Rune Balot | | |
| 2012 | Pokémon the Movie: Kyurem vs. the Sword of Justice | Satoshi's Tsutarja (Ash's Snivy), Joy's Tabunne (Nurse Joy's Audino) | | |
| 2012 | Wolf Children | Mrs. Fujii | | |
| 2012 | Detective Conan: The Eleventh Striker | Ai Haibara | | |
| 2012 | Smile PreCure! The Movie: Big Mismatch in a Picture Book! | Niko | | |
| 2013 | Detective Conan: Private Eye in the Distant Sea | Ai Haibara | | |
| 2013 | Lupin the 3rd vs. Detective Conan: The Movie | Ai Haibara | | |
| 2013 | Pokémon the Movie: Genesect and the Legend Awakened | Musashi (Jessie), Satoshi's Tsutarja (Ash's Snivy), Joy's Tabunne (Nurse Joy's Audino) | | |
| 2014 | Pokémon the Movie: Diancie and the Cocoon of Destruction | Musashi (Jessie), Serena's Fokko (Serena's Fennekin) | | |
| 2014 | Detective Conan: Dimensional Sniper | Ai Haibara | | |
| 2014 | Expelled from Paradise | | | |
| 2015 | Detective Conan: Sunflowers of Inferno | Ai Haibara | | |
| 2015 | Pokémon the Movie: Hoopa and the Clash of Ages | Musashi (Jessie) | | |
| 2016 | Detective Conan: The Darkest Nightmare | Ai Haibara | | |
| 2016 | Pokémon the Movie: Volcanion and the Mechanical Marvel | Musashi (Jessie), Serena's Tairenar (Serena's Braixen) | | |
| 2017 | Pokémon the Movie: I Choose You! | Musashi (Jessie) | | |
| 2018 | Detective Conan: Zero the Enforcer | Ai Haibara | | |
| 2018 | Pokémon the Movie: Everyone's Story | Musashi (Jessie) | | |
| 2018 | Star Blazers: Space Battleship Yamato 2202 | Megumi Kanzaki | Sixth film | |
| 2019 | Case Closed: The Fist of Blue Sapphire | Ai Haibara | | |
| 2019 | Pokémon: Mewtwo Strikes Back – Evolution | Musashi (Jessie) | | |
| 2020 | Pokémon the Movie: Secrets of the Jungle | Musashi (Jessie) | | |
| 2021 | Evangelion: 3.0+1.0 Thrice Upon a Time | Rei Ayanami (Tentative Name) | | |
| 2021 | Case Closed: The Scarlet Bullet | Ai Haibara | | |
| 2021 | My Hero Academia: World Heroes Mission | Pino | | |
| 2021 | Sword Art Online Progressive: Aria of a Starless Night | Kyoko Yuuki | | |
| 2022 | Case Closed: The Bride of Halloween | Ai Haibara | | |
| 2023 | Pretty Guardian Sailor Moon Cosmos The Movie | Sailor Galaxia | | |
| 2023 | Detective Conan: Black Iron Submarine | Ai Haibara | | |
| 2024 | Detective Conan: The Million-dollar Pentagram | Ai Haibara | | |
| 2025 | Detective Conan: One-eyed Flashback | Ai Haibara | | |
| 2026 | Patlabor EZY: File 1 | Kimika Saeki | | |
| 2026 | Detective Conan: Fallen Angel of the Highway | Ai Haibara | | |
| 2026 | Patlabor EZY: File 2 | Kimika Saeki | | |
| 2027 | Patlabor EZY: File 3 | Kimika Saeki | | |

=== Video games ===
| Year | Title | Platform | Role(s) | Notes | Ref |
|---|---|---|---|---|---|
| 1991–1995 | Hebereke (series) | | Hebe | | |
| 1992 | Knuckle Heads | | Christine Myao | | |
| 1993 | Flash Hiders | | Tiria Rosette | | |
| 1994 | Game no Kanzume Volumes 1 & 2 | | Announcer and Mascot | | |
| 1995 | Blue Seed: The Legend of Hiroku Kushinada | Sega Saturn | Momiji Fujimiya | | |
| 1995 | 3×3 Eyes Kyūsei Kōshu | PlayStation, Sega Saturn | Pai | | |
| 1995 | Battle Tycoon: Flash Hiders SFX | | Tiria Rosette | | |
| 1996 | Jikū Tantei DD: Maboroshi no Rōrerai | Sega Saturn, PlayStation | Maria Helsing | | |
| 1996 | Neon Genesis Evangelion | Sega Saturn | Rei Ayanami | | |
| 1996 | Ranma ½: Battle Renaissance | PlayStation | Ranma Saotome (female) | | |
| 1996 | Mobile Suit Gundam Side Story: The Blue Destiny | Marion Whelch | | | |
| 1997 | Ray Tracers | PlayStation | Asuka Saito | | |
| 1997 | Neon Genesis Evangelion: 2nd Impression | Sega Saturn | Rei Ayanami | | |
| 1997 | Saber Marionette J: Battle Sabers | PlayStation | Lime | | |
| 1997 | Neon Genesis Evangelion: Girlfriend of Steel | Windows 95, Macintosh, Sega Saturn, PlayStation | Rei Ayanami, Mana Kirishima | | |
| 1997 | Slayers Royal | Sega Saturn, PlayStation | Lina Inverse | | |
| 1997 | Super Robot Wars F | Sega Saturn | Patricia Hackman | | |
| 1997 | Everybody's Golf | | Honey | | |
| 1998 | Mobile Suit Gundam: Gihren's Greed | Sega Saturn | Christina Mackenzie | | |
| 1998 | Lunar 2: Eternal Blue Complete | Sega Saturn | Lemina Ausa | | |
| 1998 | 3×3 Eyes Tenrin' ō Genmu | PlayStation | Pai | | |
| 1998 | Slayers Royal 2 | Sega Saturn | Lina Inverse | | |
| 2000 | Love Hina 1: Ai wa Kotoba no Naka ni | PlayStation | Haruka Urashima | | |
| 2001 | Neon Genesis Evangelion: Ayanami Raising Project | Windows 95, Windows 98 | Rei Ayanami | | |
| 2003 | Love Hina Gorgeous: Chiratto Happening | PlayStation, PlayStation 2 | Haruka Urashima | | |
| 2007 | Case Closed: The Mirapolis Investigation | | Ai Haibara | | |
| 2008 | Dissidia Final Fantasy | | Shantotto | | |
| 2008 | Super Smash Bros. Brawl | | Latias, Gardevoir | | |
| 2011 | Dissidia 012 Final Fantasy | PlayStation Portable | Shantotto | | |
| 2011 | Final Fantasy Type-0 | | Andoria | | |
| 2012 | Project X Zone | Nintendo 3DS | Due Flabellum | | |
| 2014 | Granblue Fantasy | Android, IOS, Browser Game (Chromium) | Lina Inverse, Ai Haibara, Shantotto | | |
| 2015 | Dragon's Dogma Online | | Mysial | | |
| 2015 | Dissidia Final Fantasy NT | | Shantotto | | |
| 2015 | Final Fantasy Type-0 HD | | Andoria | | |
| 2016 | World of Final Fantasy | | Shantotto | | |
| 2017 | Danganronpa V3: Killing Harmony | PlayStation 4, PS Vita, PC | Shuichi Saihara | | |
| 2017 | Fire Emblem Heroes | Android, IOS | Freyja | | |
| 2022 | Sonic Frontiers | PlayStation 4, PlayStation 5, Xbox One, Xbox Series X, Nintendo Switch, PC | Sage | | |
| 2022 | Dragon Quest Treasures | Nintendo Switch | Oozabella, Monsters | | |
| 2024 | Goddess of Victory: Nikke | Android, iOS | Rei Ayanami | | |

=== Live-action ===
| Date | Title | Type | Role | Notes | Ref |
|---|---|---|---|---|---|
| 2000 | Juvenile | Film | Tetra (voice) / Female Researcher | | |
| 2012 | Giant God Warrior Appears in Tokyo | Film | Narrator | | |
| 2023–26 | Vivant | TV | Narrator | 2 seasons | |
| 2026 | Vivant: The Movie | Film | Narrator | | |

=== Dubbing roles ===
| Original year | Dub year | Title | Role | Original actor | Notes | Ref |
|---|---|---|---|---|---|---|
| 1965 | | Peanuts ("Charlie Brown") specials | Marcie | | Animation | |
| 1987–1995 | | Full House | Aaron Bailey | Miko Hughes | | |
| 1990 | | Bright Lights, Big City | Amanda Conway | Phoebe Cates | | |
| 1990 | | Star Trek: The Next Generation | René Picard | David Birkin | Episode "Family" | |
| 1991 | | My Girl | Thomas James Sennett | Macaulay Culkin | | |
| 1992 | | FernGully: The Last Rainforest | Crysta | Samantha Mathis | | |
| 1992–1995 | | Batman: The Animated Series | Batgirl/Barbara Gordon | Tara Strong | | |
| 1994 | | True Lies | Dana Tasker | Eliza Dushku | | |
| 1995 | | Annie: A Royal Adventure! | Annie Warbucks | Ashley Johnson | | |
| 1996 | | Scream | Casey Becker | Drew Barrymore | | |
| 1996 | | Donkey Kong Country | Diddy Kong | Andrew Sabiston | Animation | |
| 1999–2007 | | Robbie the Reindeer | Donner | | | |
| 2000 | | My Dog Skip | Willie Morris | Frankie Muniz | | |
| 2000–2015 | | CSI: Crime Scene Investigation | Avery Ryan | Patricia Arquette | | |
| 2001 | | Amélie | Amélie Poulain | Audrey Tautou | | |
| 2006–2010 | | Chaotic | Takinom | Eva Christensen | | |
| 2013 | | Her | Samantha | Scarlett Johansson | | |
| 2013 | | Pacific Rim | Mako Mori | Rinko Kikuchi | | |
| 2014 | | Chef | Molly | Scarlett Johansson | | |
| 2016 | | Independence Day: Resurgence | Dr. Catherine Marceaux | Charlotte Gainsbourg | | |
| 2016 | | RWBY | Raven Branwen | | Animation | |
| 2018 | | Pacific Rim Uprising | Mako Mori | Rinko Kikuchi | | |
| 2019 | | Pokémon Detective Pikachu | Dr. Ann Laurent | Rita Ora | | |
| 2021 | | Cowboy Bebop | Faye Valentine | Daniella Pineda | | |
| 2022 | | Sing 2 | Linda Le Bon | | Animation | |
| 2022 | | Only Murders in the Building | Mabel Mora | Selena Gomez | | |

=== Drama CD ===
Audio drama performances
| Year | Title | Label | catalog number | Role | Notes | Sources |
|---|---|---|---|---|---|---|
| 1990 | RG Veda | King Records | KICA-19 | Ashura | | |
| 1992 | Nekomusume Sound Phase 0I | KICA-123 | Natsume Atsuko | | | |
| 1992 | Nekomusume Sound Phase 0II | KICA-129 | Natsume Atsuko | | | |
| 1992 | Kodomotachi ha Yoru no Juunin | — | — | Yumi | | |
| 1993 | Nekomusume Sound Phase 0III | KICA-140 | Natsume Atsuko | | | |
| 1993 | Nekomusume Sound Phase 0V | KICA-152 | Natsume Atsuko | | | |
| 1993 | Nekomusume Sound Phase 0VI | KICA-164 | Natsume Atsuko | | | |
| 1993 | Lamune & 40 DX | — | — | Mountain Dew Gold | | |
| 1994 | GS Mikami Gokuraku Daisakusen | — | KICA-211 | DJ | | |
| 1994 | Bakuretsu Hunter Whip 2 | Starchild | KICA-213 | | | |
| 1994 | Popful Mail Paradise | King Records | KICA-1150; KICA-1156; KICA-1161; KICA-1164; KICA-1169 | Mail | Series of five CDs | |
| 1995 | Bakuretsu Hunter Whip 5 | King Records | KICA-229 | | | |
| 1995 | Saber Marionette R first series | Starchild | KICA-234 | | | |
| 1995 | Saber Marionette R second series | Starchild | KICA-240 | | | |
| 1995 | Saber Marionette R third series | Starchild | KICA-244 | | | |
| 1995 | Bakuretsu Hunter II | King Records | KICA-245, ... KICA-278 | Tira Misu | Series of five CDs | |
| 1995 | Dancing Whispers | — | — | Miifa | | |
| 1995 | SM Girls Saber Marionette R | — | — | Lime | | |
| 1996 | Saber Marionette J first series | Starchild | KICA-288 | | | |
| 1996 | Saber Marionette J second series | Starchild | KICA-292 | | | |
| 1996 | Saber Marionette J third series | Starchild | KICA-299 | | | |
| 1996 | Saber Marionette J fourth series | Starchild | KICA-304 | | | |
| 1996 | Mujintou Monogatari | — | JSCA-29040 | Saori Kurashima | | |
| 1996 | Popful Mail The Next Generation | King Records | KICA-1184; KICA-1195 | Mail | Series of two CDs | |
| 1996 | Lips the Agent | King Records | — | Yuu, Winter Fairy | | |
| 1996 | Mujintou Monogatari | — | — | Kurashima Saori | | |
| 1996 | Neon Genesis Evangelion | — | — | Rei Ayanami | | |
| 1996 | Slayers Extra | — | — | Lina Inverse | | |
| 1996–1999 | SM Girls Saber Marionette J | — | — | Lime | | |
| 1997 | Jungle de Ikou! | | KICA-346; KICA-353; KICA-363 | Ongo | Series of three CDs | |
| 1999 | Akihabara Dennou Gumi | — | — | Tsubame | radio drama | |
| 2000 | DiGi Charat CD Drama so nyo 4 | — | GCFC-008 | Pyokola-Analog III | | |
| 2000 | DiGi Charat CD Drama so nyo 5 | — | GCFC-010 | Pyokola-Analog III | | |
| 2000 | Slayers vs. Orphen | King Records | — | Lina Inverse | | |
| 2000–2001 | Love Hina | — | — | Urashima Haruka | | |
| 2001 | Di Gi Charat | — | — | Pyokola-Analog III | | |
| — | Shadow Skill | — | — | El Lag | | |
| — | Tokyo Juliette | — | — | Ayase Minori | | |

== Discography ==
=== Albums ===
| Year | Album details | Peak Oricon chart position | Sales (JPN) | Certifications (sales thresholds) |
|---|---|---|---|---|
| 1991 | Half and, Half: Released: March 21, 1991 (Re-release: March 16, 2005); Label: Starchild; Format: CD | 43 | 20,180 | |
| 1992 | Whatever: Released: March 5, 1992 (Re-release: March 16, 2005); Label: Starchild; Format: CD | 18 | 22,180 | |
| 1992 | Perfume: Released: August 5, 1992 (Re-release: March 16, 2005); Label: Starchild; Format: CD | 13 | 27,090 | |
| 1993 | Shamrock: Released: August 21, 1993 (Re-release: March 16, 2005); Label: Starchild; Format: CD | 12 | 42,510 | |
| 1994 | Sphere: Released: July 2, 1994 (Re-release: March 16, 2005); Label: Starchild; Format: CD | 8 | 70,810 | |
| 1995 | Enfleurage: Released: March 5, 1995 (Re-release: March 16, 2005); Label: Starchild; Format: CD | 6 | 97,260 | |
| 1996 | Bertemu: Released: November 1, 1996 (Re-release: March 16, 2005); Label: Starchild; Format: CD | 3 | 222,860 | RIAJ (phy.): Gold |
| 1997 | Irāvatī: Released: August 6, 1997 (Re-release: March 16, 2005); Label: Starchild; Format: CD | 5 | 277,060 | RIAJ (phy.): Gold |
| 1999 | Fuwari: Released: October 27, 1999 (Re-release: March 16, 2005); Label: Starchild; Format: CD | 5 | 117,820 | RIAJ (phy.): Gold |
| 2002 | Feel Well: Released: June 26, 2002; Label: Starchild; Format: CD | 7 | 101,410 | RIAJ (phy.): Gold |
| 2004 | Center Color: Released: January 7, 2004; Label: Starchild; Format: CD, CD+DVD | 10 | 50,025 | |
| 2007 | Plain: Released: April 21, 2007; Label: Starchild; Format: CD, CD+DVD | 18 | 19,694 | |
| 2010 | Choice: Released: July 21, 2010; Label: Starchild; Format: CD, CD+DVD | 6 | 18,926 | |
| 2018 | Fifty-Fifty: Released: March 30, 2018; Label: King Amusement Creative; Format: CD, CD+Blu-ray disc (Limited edition) | 18 | 8,462 | |

=== Singles ===
| Year | Song(s) | Peak Oricon chart position | First-week sales | Total sales | Certification | Album |
|---|---|---|---|---|---|---|
| 1988 | "Yakusoku da yo" | — | — | — | | |
| 1990 | "Pulse" | 92 | 1,370 | 2,630 | | |
| 1991 | "Niji-iro no Sneaker" | 43 | 6,190 | 11,000 | | Half and, Half / Whatever |
| 1992 | "Yume o Dakishimete" | 90 | 2,550 | 2,550 | | Shamrock |
| 1992 | "Haruneko Fushigi Tsukiyo: Oshiete Happiness" | 49 | 6,060 | 8,740 | | |
| 1993 | "Our Day... Bokura no Good Day" | 54 | 7,940 | 11,080 | | Shamrock |
| 1993 | "Yume Hurry Up" | 58 | 6,980 | 6,980 | | Sphere |
| 1994 | "Until Strawberry Sherbet" | 42 | 10,990 | 15,320 | | Sphere |
| 1994 | "Touch and Go!!" | 37 | 11,360 | 16,450 | | Enfleurage |
| 1995 | "Get Along" (with Masami Okui) | 36 | 19,620 | 76,800 | | Non-album single |
| 1995 | "Midnight Blue" | 27 | 19,560 | 71,550 | | Bertemu |
| 1995 | "Going History" | 25 | 27,910 | 62,560 | | Bertemu |
| 1996 | "Give a Reason" | 9 | 70,180 | 232,850 | RIAJ (phy.): Gold; RIAJ (dig.): Gold | Bertemu |
| 1996 | "Kagiri nai Yokubō no Naka de" | 20 | 26,510 | 69,510 | | |
| 1996 | "Just Be Conscious" | 11 | 65,460 | 175,110 | | Iravati |
| 1996 | "Successful Mission" | 7 | 66,450 | 139,120 | RIAJ (phy.): Gold | Iravati |
| 1997 | "Don't Be Discouraged" | 4 | 105,590 | 211,340 | RIAJ (phy.): Gold | Feel Well |
| 1997 | "Reflection" | 25 | 80,310 | 136,170 | RIAJ (phy.): Gold | Iravati |
| 1998 | "Fine Colorday" | 9 | 54,520 | 91,720 | | |
| 1998 | "Infinity" | 8 | 64,640 | 141,510 | | |
| 1998 | "Raging Waves" | 8 | 50,340 | 111,970 | | |
| 1998 | "A House Cat" | 6 | 46,830 | 87,220 | | |
| 1998 | "Proof of Myself" | 9 | 49,210 | 91,750 | | |
| 1999 | "Question at Me" | 13 | 45,350 | 72,570 | | Fuwari |
| 1999 | "Booska! Booska!!" | 50 | 5,840 | 8,400 | | Feel Well |
| 2000 | "Sakura Saku" | 7 | 64,660 | 104,500 | RIAJ (phy.): Gold | Feel Well |
| 2000 | "Unsteady" | 14 | 30,720 | 40,880 | | Feel Well |
| 2001 | "Over Soul" | 7 | 60,930 | 110,570 | RIAJ (phy.): Gold | Feel Well |
| 2001 | "Feel Well" | 11 | 22,220 | 38,720 | | Feel Well |
| 2001 | "Brave Heart" | 11 | 40,390 | 63,800 | | Feel Well |
| 2002 | "Northern Lights" | 3 | 44,660 | 93,080 | RIAJ (phy.): Gold; RIAJ (dig.): Gold | Center Color |
| 2002 | "Treat or Goblins" | 19 | 15,820 | 30,970 | | Center Color |
| 2002 | "Koibumi" | 7 | 34,140 | 65,220 | | Center Color / Plain |
| 2003 | "Makenaide, Makenaide..." | 8 | 14,408 | 25,041 | | Plain |
| 2006 | "Meet Again" | 12 | 14,263 | 24,393 | | Plain |
| 2007 | "A Happy Life" | 12 | 10,875 | 20,108 | | Choice |
| 2008 | "Plenty of Grit" | 6 | 14,940 | 25,931 | | Choice |
| 2009 | "Front Breaking" | 15 | 8,949 | 13,782 | | Choice |
| 2009 | "Shūketsu no Sono e" | 7 | 14,865 | 43,588 | RIAJ (ring.): 2× Platinum | Choice |
| 2010 | "Shūketsu no Unmei" | 5 | 11,528 | 21,633 | RIAJ (ring.):Gold | Vintage White |
| 2012 | "Tsubasa" | 36 | 1,575 | 3,940 | | Fifty-Fifty |
| 2015 | "Sanhara: Sei naru Chikara" | 17 | 4,181 | 6,088 | | Fifty-Fifty |
| 2016 | "Usurai Shinju" | 13 | 5,568 | 8,659 | | Fifty-Fifty |
| 2017 | "Imawa no Shinigami" | 31 | 3,438 | 4,646 | | Fifty-Fifty |
| 2021 | "Soul Salvation" | 9 | 6,167 | | | TBA |
| 2022 | "Shūketsu no Hate ni" | 21 | | | | TBA |
| 2023 | "Shūketsu no Yari/Shūketsu no Hajimari" | 22 | | | | TBA |
| 2024 | "Gathering" | 22 | | | | TBA |

== Substitutes ==
- Akiko Hiramatsu—Pokemon: Advanced Generation: Musashi
