= Slayers Special (OVA) =

1996 collection of three original video animation Slayers episodes

- Japanese cover art of Volume 1 (LaserDisc)

スレイヤーズすぺしゃる (Sureiyāzu supesharu)
- Genre: Adventure, fantasy comedy
- Original video animation
- Directed by: Hiroshi Watanabe
- Produced by: Takeshi Tamiya
- Written by: Hajime Kanzaka
- Music by: Takayuki Hattori
- Studio: J.C.Staff
- Licensed by: AUS: Madman; EU: ADV Films UK; NA: ADV Films
- Released: July 25, 1996 – May 25, 1997
- Episodes: 3

Slayers Special (スレイヤーズすぺしゃる, Sureiyāzu supesharu), also known as Slayers: Dragon Slave, Slayers: Explosion Array and Slayers: The Book of Spells in North America, is a series of three comic fantasy themed OVA self-conclusive episodes adapted from the Slayers Special series of light-novels by Hajime Kanzaka, serving as a part of the prequel to the main Slayers saga. The three episodes were all directed by Hiroshi Watanabe and originally released separately in Japan in 1996–1997. Both Special and the second OVA series, 1998's Slayers Excellent, were directed by Watanabe and share the same soundtrack (Slayers The Motion Picture "S"), although each series had their own production committees and has its own opening and ending themes.

In the first episode, "The Scary Chimera Plan" (恐怖のリメラ計画, Kyōfu no rimera keikaku), Lina Inverse refuses to take place in a chimera experiment so the wizard scientist makes clones to force Lina; however, he clones Naga the Serpent instead, which leads to his downfall. In the second episode, "Jeffrey's Knighthood" (ジェフリー君の騎士道, Jefurī-kun no kishidō), Lina and Naga are hired to train a pathetic yet overconfident young man by his mother, who follows him around and beats up anyone who talks negatively about her son. In the third episode, "Mirror, Mirror" (鏡よ鏡, Kagami yo, kagami), Lina and Naga are hired to find and destroy a magic mirror that makes clones of whoever is reflected; the only difference is the clones have the opposite personality of the original, as Lina and Naga personally find out.

== Plot ==
=== "The Scary Chimera Plan" ===
Sorceress Lina Inverse is contacted by an alchemist Diol, who had requested her help in one of his experiments. She then finds out that Diol plans to use her in creating a super chimera which would combine her with a lesser demon and a sea serpent. Lina turns him down, and after Lina's on-and-off companion and rival Naga the Serpent arrives and agrees to the plan, destroys Diol's lab in anger.

A month later, Lina and Naga are attacked and Lina accidentally knocks out Naga with a spell. However, when she corners the last enemy, she finds that it is Diol, who has ten cloaked figures with him and says he created them from a single strand of hair found in his wrecked lab. Lina thinks that the copies are of her and challenges Diol, knowing that the copies will be unable to use her magic. However, when Diol unveils the copies, they are all copies of Naga, whose sight and sound (ten Nagas laughing together) frightens Lina so much that she faints.

Diol then spirits Lina away and is met by Vista, a brigand with a grudge against Lina, who sponsored Diol's experiments. They find out that Naga was looking for Lina and Diol sends his Naga clones to confront the sorceress. However, instead of defeating Naga, the clones bond with her. Realizing the mistake he made, Diol ran back to Vista, where the both of them find that Naga and her clones (all laughing maniacally) are on their way. In a panic, they abandon the lab, leaving beyond Lina under the influence of a sleep spell. Naga finds and revives Lina and accuses her of leaving her behind to make an alliance with Diol. Lina claims that Diol had broken their agreement and took the money all to themselves. Together, the two then catch up to Diol and Vista and capture them. Lina, with Naga, then collects the reward money for their capture and wonders how to deal with ten more Nagas in the world.

=== "Jeffrey's Knighthood" ===
Lina and Naga are contracted by Josephine, a woman who is seeking to have the girls tutor her son Jeffrey in a quest of be a member of the royal guard. To accomplish this, Josephine told them that she has hired actors to pose as brigands so that the boy could easily defeat them and gain confidence in his abilities. They meet Jeffrey and are disappointed to find the boy was a sorry excuse for a soldier – he is skinny, clumsy, not to mention his bad habit of blundering headstrong into any battle to show off. However, whenever Naga tries to point out his deficiencies, she is met with an angry masked Josephine who clobbers her with a huge mallet. Apparently this sort of thing happens quite often, but Jeffrey is completely oblivious to her actions, despite them being obvious to everyone else. When the three arrived at the brigands' hideout, Lina and Naga are shocked to find that the real bandits had captured the actors, but they are able to defeat them using their magic.

Later, Lina and Naga are asked by Jeffrey to aid him in defeating a warlord's army of beast men. He informs them that Josephine had contracted an army for her son, for which he named "the Flaming Knights". It turns out that the men Josephine hired were as weak, if not weaker, that Jeffrey is, and prone to panic. Lina and Naga defeat the monsters but are stymied by the warlord Galda, wearing a magical armor. But when Galda insults Jeffrey, he is quickly defeated by Josephine, who comes out of nowhere and mallets him into submission.

Galda then leads Lina and Naga to his patron, the evil baron Goldias. While Galda and Goldias fight each other, Lina and Naga are forced to fight an army of living armor. Knowing that Galda would need her help, Lina then kicks Naga into the armor army and is surprised to find that she dispelled the magic animating the armor. It is at that point that Jeffrey stupidly charges Goldias, tripping and falling over the fallen armor. Then a surprising thing happens – Goldias backpedals away from Jeffrey, calling him by name. It turns out that Goldias is Jeffrey's father, after which Josephine shows up and mallets her errand husband. Lina, Naga and Galda leave the castle, abandoning Jeffrey's family to their reunion.

=== "Mirror, Mirror" ===
Over 400 years ago, there lived a famous magician named Shizaal Rigandi, whose greatest talent was in the creation of magical items. One of these was the Shadow Reflector, a mirror capable of making an exact copy of whoever's image is captured on its surface. The copy that would be created would have the same knowledge and skills as the original, but would be opposite in personality and loyal to the holder of the mirror. However, just as the mirror was created, Rigandi had mysteriously hid it and it had become an object of legend. The Professional Magic-users Society discovers maps and papers related to the Shadow Reflector, but the society's vice president Lagan steals these documents, hoping to find the mirror for himself and use it to create an army of sorcerers that would be loyal only to him – and with that, take over the entire world.

Lina and Naga are in pursuit of Lagan, mainly for the reward the Society promised for his capture. The girls have a difficult time tracking him down and are forced to fight off Lagan's werewolf army. In time, however, they are able find Lagan, but it is too late. Lagan has found the Shadow Reflector and as a test, uses it to create "shadow" copies of Lina and Naga. Bracing for a fight, Lina is horrified to discover that her copy, while still having her magical abilities, has a complete opposite personality to hers – a simpering, nonviolent, charitable person who does not want to fight. The Shadow Naga is about the same as the original Naga, only overly modest and also peaceful.

Recovering from her adverse reaction to her copy, Lina then surmises that Rigandi, while brilliant in creating the Reflector, was embarrassed to discover that it worked too well and hid the defective mirror rather than having his blunder revealed to the world. Lagan, not caring about the obvious defects in the mirror, flees with the remainder of his army. Lina takes off after him, even as her copy pleads with her not to harm Lagan. Lagan's flight from justice is interrupted by other magicians looking for the bounty, but Lagan soundly defeats them. He is then met by Lina and Naga—and is horrified to find that his shadow copies (especially Shadow Lina) are pleading with him to turn himself in. Thinking that the doubles would disappear when the Shadow Reflector is destroyed, Lina and Naga attack Lagan, and the mirror is destroyed. However, the copies of Lina and Naga do not disappear and wander off, later seen at a "Save the Dragons" concert.

== Cast ==
Character	Japanese voice actor	English voice actor
Lina Inverse	Megumi Hayashibara	Cynthia Martinez
Naga the Serpent	Maria Kawamura	Kelly Manison
Jeffrey	Akira Ishida	Brett Weaver
Lagan	Banjou Ginga	Rob Bundy
Goldias	Hidekatsu Shibata	Brett Weaver
Dark Knight (Galda)	Ryûzaburô Ôtomo	Guil Lunde
Josephine	Rihoko Yoshida	Marcy Rae
Vista	Kaneto Shiozawa	Bryan Bounds
Diol	Takeshi Aono	Tristan MacAvery

== Release ==
Each Special OVA was released on VHS and LaserDisc between July 25, 1996, and May 25, 1997, before being released together on DVD in 2000. After that, both OVA series were released, along with the five Slayers, in a DVD pack in 2006. In 2010, the two series were released again on DVD in the "EMOTION the best" collection. It will be included in the collection of digitally remastered Slayers films and OAV series, released on Blu-ray in Japan on October 30, 2015.

In North America, Slayers Special was initially released on as two separate titles, Slayers Dragon Slave (first two episodes) and Slayers Explosion Array (the third). On January 12, 1999, ADV Films released Slayers: Explosion Array! on VHS in a choice of subtitled and dubbed options. The English dubbing version from Industrial Smoke & Mirrors was written, directed and produced by Matt Greenfield. On January 9, 2001, ADV Films released the DVD titled Slayers: The Book of Spells, containing all three episodes, digitally-remastered and with two audio tracks; Book of Spells was later re-released by ADV in 2005 in their "Essential Anime" series ADV later included it in their Slayers – OVA DVD Collection in 2007, and finally as part of their DVD box set Slayers – Movies & OVAs in 2008.

In Australia and New Zealand, Madman Entertainment released Slayers special as a part of their 2006 collection Slayers OVA Collection. It was also distributed by Yamato Video in Italy (in a dubbed version made by DEA Digital Editing Audio, written by Benedetta Brugia and directed by Federico Danti) and by OVA Films in Germany.

=== Soundtrack ===
The original soundtrack Slayers Special: The Motion Picture "S" was composed by Takayuki Hattori and released in Japan by Starchild Records on July 24, 1997. It is a collection of Takayuki Hattori's background music (BGM) from Slayers Special that was later also used for the second OVA series, Slayers Excellent. Besides these, it contains the full versions of the opening themes (opening) and closing (ending) as well as a special version of the opening theme. The vocal songs including the ending theme "Kagirinai Yokubou no Naka ni" were performed by Megumi Hayashibara. They were later included in the CD collection The Best of Slayers Vol. 2 (From OVA, Movie & Game).

Slayers Great: Motion Picture "S"

Soundtrack album by Takayuki Hattori
- Released: July 24, 1997
- Recorded: 1997
- Genres: Orchestral, J-pop
- Label: King Records

No.	Title	Length
1.	"怪しき幻影 Ayashiki gen'ei"	2:44
2.	"限りない欲望の中に(OVA Size) Kagirinai yokubou no naka ni (OVA Size)"	2:37
3.	"メインタイトル (for "すぺしゃる) MEIN TAITORU (for "SUPESHARU")"	0:20
4.	"リメラ大進撃 RIMERA daishingeki"	1:40
5.	"黒髪の淑女 Kurokami no shukyo"	3:24
6.	"余裕しゃくしゃくの緊迫感 Yoyuushakushaku no kinpakukan"	2:27
7.	"追うものと追われるものと Ou mono to owareru mono to"	1:58
8.	"フェロモンは風に舞う FEROMON wa kaze ni mau"	2:26
9.	"Run all the way!"	4:56
10.	"決麗しき貴婦人 Uruwashiki kifujin"	1:09
11.	"騎士たるものは...Kishitaru mono wa..."	1:18
12.	"ピンチの中にチャンスあり? PINCHI no naka ni chance ari?"	1:28
13.	"闇からの刺客 Yami kara no shikyaku"	1:15
14.	"危険な香りに誘われて Kiken na kaori ni sasowarete"	1:27
15.	"Touch yourself"	5:09
16.	"いつもの二人はいつもの通り Itsumono futari wa itsumono toori"	1:59
17.	"風の向くまま、気の向くまま Kaze no muku mama, ki no muku mama"	2:13
18.	"限りない欲望の中に Kagirinai yokubou no naka ni"	5:08

== Reception ==
Slayers Special was well received by anime critics. Dave Halverson awarded its Dragon Slave version four-and-half stars out five in 1999, hailing its "excellent" animation as "the best you'll find this side of a major theatrical release" and "simply the highest standards" soundtrack as well as "surprisingly high quality" dubbing, ranking it and Slayers: The Motion Picture among North America's best anime releases in 1999. He wrote Dragon Slave comes highly recommended – it's funny, action packed, and splendidly written, acted, and animated. Do not miss it." He also reviewed the Explosion Array release for four-and-half stars out of five as well, calling it "the joy to behold from beginning to end." Aleksandra Janusz from Polish magazine Kawaii stated that, in her personal opinion, this "obligatory" series was the best extra-television adaptation of Slayers. On the other hand, video game magazine Hyper gave the Dragon Slave release an overall score of 6/10, opining it is "only mildly humorous. Only for die-hard fans, as it's not a great value for money."

Adam 'OMEGA' Arnold from Animefringe awarded The Book of Spells an overall rating of B+ and noted that the English dub was, in his opinion, "one of ADV's finest." Marc 'Makosuke' Marshall of AAW awarded this "good, stupid, low-brow Slayers fun" three-and-half stars out of five, writing that "with three classic fantasy plots gone horribly wrong, these stories are silly, pointless, and as with all things Slayers, hilarious." According to Chris Beveridge of Mania.com, who gave it a score of B+, "if you're a Slayers fan, you'll be happy. If you want fan service, you'll be exceptionally happy." Beveridge later also gave a positive review for the collection re-release, writing that "both shows are still pretty much exactly what they were then and they still entertain pretty well, depending on what you're looking for."
