= Slayers =

Japanese light novel series and its franchise

- First light novel volume cover, featuring Lina Inverse

スレイヤーズ (Sureiyāzu)
- Genre: Adventure; Fantasy comedy; Sword and sorcery
- Light novel
- Written by: Hajime Kanzaka
- Illustrated by: Rui Araizumi
- Published by: Fujimi Shobo
- English publisher: NA: Tokyopop (former); J-Novel Club
- Imprint: Fujimi Fantasia Bunko
- Magazine: Dragon Magazine
- Original run: 1989 – present
- Volumes: 17
- Anime television series
- Directed by: Takashi Watanabe
- Produced by: Noriko Kobayashi (S1–3); Yumiko Yazaki (S1–3); Yuji Matsukura (S4 & 5); Go Shukuri (S4 & 5)
- Written by: Takao Koyama (S1); Jiro Takayama (S2–5)
- Music by: Osamu Tezuka; Vink
- Studio: E&G Films (S1–3); J.C.Staff (S4 & 5)
- Licensed by: Crunchyroll; UK: MVM Films
- Original network: TXN (TV Tokyo)
- English network: US: Funimation Channel, Colours TV (S1), International Channel (S1–3)
- Original run: April 7, 1995 – April 6, 2009
- Episodes: 104
- Anime series seasons
- 1. Slayers (1995, 26 episodes); 2. Slayers Next (1996, 26 episodes); 3. Slayers Try (1997, 26 episodes); 4. Slayers Revolution (2008, 13 episodes); 5. Slayers Evolution-R (2009, 13 episodes)
Further information
Light novel
Slayers Special
Written by	Hajime Kanzaka
Illustrated by	Rui Araizumi
Published by	Fujimi Shobo
Imprint	Fujimi Fantasia Bunko
Magazine	Dragon Magazine
Original run	July 25, 1991 – January 25, 2008
Volumes	30
Manga
Slayers: Medieval Mayhem
Written by	Hajime Kanzaka
Illustrated by	Rui Araizumi
Published by	Fujimi Shobo
English publisher	NA: Central Park Media
Magazine	Dragon Magazine
Published	1995
Volumes	1
Manga
Slayers: Super-Explosive Demon Story
Written by	Hajime Kanzaka
Illustrated by	Shoko Yoshinaka
Published by	Fujimi Shobo
English publisher	AUS: Madman Entertainment; NA: Central Park Media
Magazine	Comic Dragon, Dragon Junior
Original run	1995 – 2001
Volumes	8
Light novel
Slayers Delicious
Written by	Hajime Kanzaka
Illustrated by	Rui Araizumi
Published by	Fujimi Shobo
Imprint	Fujimi Fantasia Bunko
Magazine	Dragon Magazine
Original run	March 10, 1997 – July 25, 1999
Volumes	4
Manga
Slayers Special
Written by	Tommy Ohtsuka
Published by	Fujimi Shobo
English publisher	AUS: Madman Entertainment
Magazine	Dragon Junior
Original run	2000 – 2001
Volumes	4
Manga
Slayers Knight of the Aqualord
Written by	Tommy Ohtsuka
Published by	Fujimi Shobo
Magazine	Dragon Junior; Monthly Dragon Age
Original run	2003 – 2005
Volumes	6
Manga
Slayers Premium
Written by	Tommy Ohtsuka
Published by	Fujimi Shobo
English publisher	AUS: Madman Entertainment
Magazine	Dragon Junior
Original run	2004 – 2005
Volumes	1
Light novel
Slayers VS Orphen
Written by	Hajime Kanzaka; Yoshinobu Akita
Illustrated by	Rui Araizumi; Yuuya Kusaka
Published by	Fujimi Shobo
Imprint	Fujimi Fantasia Bunko
Magazine	Dragon Magazine
Published	2005
Light novel
Slayers Smash
Written by	Hajime Kanzaka
Illustrated by	Rui Araizumi
Published by	Fujimi Shobo
Magazine	Dragon Magazine
Original run	2008 – 2011
Volumes	5
Manga
Slayers Legend
Written by	Issei Hyōji
Published by	Fujimi Shobo
Magazine	Monthly Dragon Age
Original run	2008 – 2009
Volumes	2
Manga
Slayers Light Magic
Written by	Yoshijirō Muramatsu
Illustrated by	Shin Sasaki
Published by	Kadokawa Shoten
Magazine	Kerokero Ace
Original run	July 26, 2008 – April 26, 2009
Volumes	2
Manga
Slayers Revolution
Written by	Issei Hyōji
Published by	Fujimi Shobo
Magazine	Monthly Dragon Age
Published	2008
Volumes	1
Manga
Slayers Evolution-R
Written by	Issei Hyōji
Published by	Fujimi Shobo
Magazine	Monthly Dragon Age
Published	2009
Volumes	1
- Films
- Slayers Perfect (1995); Slayers Return (1996); Slayers Great (1997); Slayers Gorgeous (1998); Slayers Premium (2001, short)
- OVAs
- Slayers Special (1996); Slayers Excellent (1998)
- icon

Slayers (Japanese: スレイヤーズ, Hepburn: Sureiyāzu) is a Japanese light novel series written by Hajime Kanzaka and illustrated by Rui Araizumi. The novels have been serialized in Dragon Magazine since 1989, before being published into individual volumes. They follow the adventures of teenage sorceress Lina Inverse and her companions as they journey through their world. Using powerful magic and swordsmanship they battle overreaching wizards, demons seeking to destroy the world, and an occasional hapless gang of bandits.

Slayers inspired several spin-off novel series and has been adapted into numerous manga titles, anime television series, anime films, OVA series, role-playing video games, and other media. Including the spin-off series and digital copies, the novels have sold over 22 million copies. The anime series is considered to be one of the most popular of the 1990s.

== Plot ==
=== Setting ===
In the Slayers universe, the ultimate being is the Lord of Nightmares, the creator of at least four parallel worlds. An artifact known as the Claire Bible contains information about the Lord of Nightmares' task to regain its "true form", which is only attainable by destroying these worlds and returning them to the chaos (sea of darkness) that it itself is. For unexplained reasons, though, the Lord of Nightmares has not acted upon this desire by itself so far. On each of these worlds are gods (神族, shinzoku; lit. 'godly race') and demons (魔族, mazoku; lit. 'demon race'), fighting without end. Should the gods win the war in a world, that world will be at peace. Should the monsters win, the world will be destroyed and returned to the Sea of Chaos.

In the world where the Slayers takes place, Flare Dragon Ceifeed and the Ruby-Eye Shabranigdu are, respectively, the supreme god and demon. Long ago, their war ended more or less in a stalemate, when Ceifeed was able to split Shabranigdu's existence into seven pieces in order to prevent him from coming back to life, then seal them within human souls. As the souls are reincarnated, the individual fragments would wear down until Shabranigdu himself would be destroyed. However, Ceifeed was so exhausted by this that he himself sank into the Sea of Chaos, leaving behind four parts of himself in the world. A millennium before the events in Slayers, one of Ruby-Eye's fragments (which was sealed in the body of Lei Magnus, a very powerful sorcerer) revived and began the Resurrection War (降魔戦争, Kōma-sensō; alternately "War of Demon Conquering") against one of the parts of Ceifeed, the Water Dragon King, also known as Aqualord Ragradia. Ultimately, the piece of Shabranigdu won, but Aqualord, using the last remnants of her power, sealed him into a block of magical ice within the Kataart Mountains. Nevertheless, Shabranigdu's lieutenants remained at liberty, sealing a part of the world within a magical barrier, through which only demons could pass.

There are four types of magic within the Slayers universe: Black, White, Shamanistic, and Holy. Black magic spells, such as the famous Dragon Slave, call directly on the powers of the demons and are capable of causing enormous damage. White magic spells are of an obscure origin and are used for healing or protection. Shamanistic magic is focused on manipulation and alteration of the basic elements of the natural world (earth, wind, fire, water and spirit) and contains spells for both offense and convenience, such as Lei Wing, Fireball, or Elemekia Lance. Holy magic uses the power of the gods, but the aforementioned barrier made its usage impossible for anyone inside before the death of the demon Hellmaster Phibrizzo. As a rule, demons can only be harmed by astral shamanistic magic, holy magic, or black magic which draws power from another demon with greater might than the target.

Above all other magic, however, are the immensely destructive spells drawing power from the Lord of Nightmares. The two spells of this class are the Ragna Blade, capable of cutting through any obstacle or being, and the Giga Slave, which can kill any opponent, but which could also destroy the world itself if the spell is miscast. Some have claimed that these terrible spells, drawing their power directly from the Lord of Nightmares, constitute a fifth form of magic: Chaos magic.

=== Story ===
The protagonist of Slayers is Lina Inverse, a teenage wandering genius sorceress with many nicknames and much infamy attached to her that she refuses to acknowledge. Lina narrates (within the novels) the history of her various adventures, ranging from whimsical and silly to dramatic to even outright world-threatening crises, in which she becomes involved along with her traveling companions everywhere she goes.

== Production ==
The first Slayers light novel was written by Hajime Kanzaka for entrance into Fujimi Fantasia Bunko's first annual Fantasia Chōhen Shōsetsu Awards in 1989. After it won, the new author was asked to create a follow-up. Kanzaka initially thought this was an impossible task as the characters had already defeated the Dark Lord. He called the second book a turning point for him and said it was initially very difficult to write. However, as soon as he added the "spike-wolves and stuff", from his love of yōkai and kaiju, the "words just flew off the page". Kanzaka set the second book in a city so that Lina could not solve the story by simply casting one big spell. He said that this taught him how using circumstances and setting could change the "flavor" of a story. The author also said that the second book is intentionally "heavier" than the first.

Kanzaka described his writing process as like trying to put together puzzle pieces that have been scattered about, figuring stuff out as he goes instead of following an outline written beforehand. As a new author, he said he was not good at submitting plot summaries to his supervisor, who wanted them before he started writing. When the supervisor passively accepted the plot summary of the third Slayers novel, but was then ecstatic with the finished book, he stopped asking for plot summaries. Kanzaka assumed that he had finally realized that the finished story was always going to widely diverge from the initial summary. The first three books were written as the author thought up stories, but volume four on tell a grander epic. Because the first novel was written as a one-off before evolving into a series, there are some inconsistencies with the later installments. A few of these inconsistencies were corrected in the 2008 reprints.

Kanzaka stated the reason Zelgadis and Amelia do not appear in "part 2" is because of the plot point concerning a character's death. Although he speculated he could have written around the healing spells, it would have taken a lot of extra steps to get there and dragged everything out a lot longer than necessary. In the afterward of the fifteenth novel, the original final installment of the series, Kanzaka said he wanted to end the story in an open-ended way in order to allow readers to imagine what happens next to Lina and Gourry. He also described the Slayers video games, television shows, and comics as "parallel part 3 stories".

Kanzaka makes references to people and events not depicted in the novels, such as Lina's older sister and Gourry Gabriev's first visit to Sairaag, which he referred to as "flavor" to stimulate the reader's imagination and clarified that they are not foreshadowing. He explained that the fictional world would feel smaller if everything that appears in the story is explained; something he learned from a teacher's comment in design school. Although some of these he has not even thought about, like Gourry's visit to Sairaag, others he has created a backstory to, such as Lina's sister. Zuma's backstory was omitted because the novels are told from Lina's first-person perspective, but Kanzaka gave some of the material to the staff of Slayers Revolution so it could be included in the anime.

== Media ==
=== Light novels ===
Slayers began serialization in Dragon Magazine in 1989 as a short story series written by Hajime Kanzaka and with artwork by Rui Araizumi. The chapters were then published as light novels under the Fujimi Fantasia Bunko imprint across 15 volumes from January 17, 1990, to May 10, 2000. Although the original story ended with the 15th volume in 2000, Kanzaka began a new arc 18 years later in the May 2018 issue of Dragon Magazine, which was published in March 2018, to celebrate the magazine and Fujimi Fantasia Bunko's 30th anniversary. He described it as "kind of a reunion" and said he had not decided to relaunch the series yet. Volume 16 was published on October 20, 2018. A third story arc began in the November 2019 issue of the magazine, released in September 2019. The author described this as "Rather than an official history, the third arc is going to be more like one of the possibilities, a parallel existence to the TRY TV anime and the Water Dragon King manga, I guess." Volume 17 was published on October 19, 2019.

On September 7, 2004, Tokyopop began publishing the novels in English, ending with the release of volume 8 on January 2, 2008. On July 3, 2020, J-Novel Club announced their rescue license of the series at Anime Expo Lite. They first release the novels digitally, with the first chapter uploaded to their website that day. Their physical release of Slayers began in July 2021 and is a 3-1 hardcover omnibus edition based on Japan's 2008 revised edition that featured new illustrations and covers.

- Slayers Special (スレイヤーズ すぺしゃる) is a spin-off prequel series of 30 novels published from 1991 to 2008. Each consisting of one-shot stories (sometimes, two-chapter stories) chronicling the exploits of Lina Inverse and Naga the Serpent before the events in Slayers. Five additional volumes were released under a new series title, Slayers Smash. (スレイヤーズ すまっしゅ。) between July 2008 and November 2011.
- Slayers Delicious (スレイヤーズ でりしゃす), a four volume prequel featuring Lina and Naga, was released between 1997 and 1999. These four stories were originally published separately by Fujimi Fantasia in mini-bunko format, and later they were included in different Special novels. A one volume crossover between Slayers and the series Sorcerous Stabber Orphen was published in 2005 under the title Slayers VS Orphen and was later reprinted in 2013.
- Slayers Select (スレイヤーズ せれくと) is a best-of compilation of Slayers Special. Its five volumes were published in August 2008, September 2008, June 2009, February 2010, and March 2010.
- Slayers Anthology was released to mark the 25th anniversary of Slayers novels in January 2015. It is a compilation of six stories, one of which was written by Kanzaka and five by fan writers. It is illustrated with previously unpublished pictures by Araizumi and contributing artists.
- Slayers Spirit (スレイヤーズすぴりっと), released in 2025, is the first short story collection in 13 years.

=== Manga ===
- Slayers (one volume, illustrated by Rui Araizumi, original story, published in 1995, reedited in 2001, also known as Slayers Medieval Mayhem)
- Chōbaku Madōden Slayers (超爆魔道伝スレイヤーズ) (eight volumes, illustrated by Shoko Yoshinaka, adapted from Slayers main novels volumes 1–8, fourth volume adapted from Slayers Return movie, 1995–2001, also known as Super Explosive Demon Story Slayers)
- Slayers Special (four volumes, illustrated by Tommy Ohtsuka and Yoshimiro Kamada, adapted from Slayers Special novels, 2000–2001)
- Slayers Premium (one volume, illustrated by Tommy Ohtsuka, adapted from the movie of the same name, 2002)
- Slayers Knight of the Aqualord (six volumes, illustrated by Tommy Ohtsuka and Yoshimiro Kamada, original storyline, 2003–2005)
- Slayers Revolution (one volume, illustrated by Issei Hyouji, adapted from the anime series of the same name, 2008)
- Shin Slayers: Falces no Sunadokei (新スレイヤーズ：ファルシェスの砂時計) / New Slayers: The Hourglass of Falces) (three volumes, illustrated by Asashi, 2008)
- Slayers Legend (two-volume compilation from old Slayers manga, with chapters from Slayers and Chōbaku Mahōden Slayers)
- Slayers Evolution-R (one volume, published in Monthly Dragon Age, illustrated by Issei Hyouji, adapted from the anime series of the same name, 2009)

Between July 26, 2008, and March 2009, a new manga series entitled Slayers Light Magic (スレイヤーズ ライト・マジック) was serialised in Kadokawa Shoten's Kerokero Ace. The series was written by Yoshijirō Muramatsu and illustrated Shin Sasaki, and set in a technological world instead of a fantasy world.

In July 1998, Central Park Media announced they had licensed the manga for distribution in North America. On June 15, 1999, Slayers: Medieval Mayhem was released. The four-volume series Slayers Special was published between October 12, 2002, and June 25, 2003. A seven-volume series Super-Explosive Demon Story followed between July 9, 2002, and December 1, 2004. Finally, Slayers Premium was published in North America on July 5, 2005.

=== Anime television series ===
The self-titled first season of the anime adapts volumes 1 and 3 of the light novels. It aired from April 7 to September 29, 1995. The second season, Slayers Next, adapts volumes 2, 4, 5, 7, and 8 of the light novels. It aired from April 5 to September 27, 1996. The third season, Slayers Try, is an original story. It aired from April 4 to September 26, 1997. A fourth season, Slayers Again, was rumored following the success of Try, but early scheduling conflicts caused interest in the project to dissipate. The first three seasons were animated by E&G Films.

A fourth anime series, Slayers Revolution, animated by J.C.Staff, aired from July 2 to September 24, 2008. A fifth Slayers series titled Slayers Evolution-R aired on AT-X from January 12 to April 6, 2009. Megumi Hayashibara, the voice actress for main character Lina Inverse, performed both the opening and ending theme songs. The new plot is told across the two seasons and follows an original storyline that has subplots based on events in the novels, with series director Takashi Watanabe reprising his role from the three original TV series.

Central Park Media licensed and distributed the anime in North America under the Software Sculptors label on VHS and Laserdisc between 1996 and 1998, collected in eight volumes. It was a commercial success for Central Park, which led them to license Slayers Next and Slayers Try; Next was first shipped from April 1999 in a similar format; a box set of the first four volumes was released in July of that same year, and a box set of the second four volumes in October. Slayers Try was released later in 2000. The first three seasons were subsequently re-released on DVD (in season box sets). Months before Central Park's license for the anime properties expired, Funimation Entertainment was able to obtain the license and it aired as part of the new owner's programming block on CoLours TV, as well as the Funimation Channel. The first bilingual DVD box set after Funimation's rescue of the license was released on August 21, 2007, retaining the Software Sculptors-produced English dub. A boxset of Slayers, Next and Try was released by Funimation on August 4, 2009.

Fox Kids won the rights to broadcast Slayers but eventually did not air the anime since it would be too heavy to edit it for content. The first North American television broadcast of The Slayers was February 17, 2002, on the International Channel. In 2009, MVM Films began releasing the series in the United Kingdom on a monthly basis. The first series was released on four DVDs between January 5, and April 6, 2009. The first volume of Slayers Next was released on May 11, 2009. Episodes have also been made available on the streaming video sites Hulu, YouTube, Crackle, Anime News Network, Netflix, and Funimation's website.

Funimation licensed both Slayers Revolution and Slayers Evolution-R for American release; the episodes in Japanese with English subtitles were uploaded to YouTube, as well as Funimation's website in July 2009. Funimation contracted NYAV Post to produce the English version of the series, with dialogue being recorded in both New York City and Los Angeles. NYAV Post was able to reunite most of the original Central Park Media main character cast for the new season. However, Michael Sinterniklaas replaced David Moo as Xellos. Other notable characters, such as Sylphiel, Prince Phil, and Naga the Serpent were also recast with new voice actors. Funimation released the first Slayers Revolution boxset on March 16, 2010. Funimation released the first four English-dubbed episodes of Slayers Revolution to YouTube on January 19, 2010. They have also uploaded the first two English-dubbed episodes of Evolution-R to YouTube and released Evolution-R on DVD in June 2010. Funimation released both Slayers Revolution and Evolution-R on Blu-ray on October 26, 2010. Both Revolution and Evolution-R made their North American television debut when they began airing on the Funimation Channel on September 6, 2010.

=== Films ===
- Slayers The Motion Picture, also known as Slayers Perfect (or Slayers the Movie: Perfect Edition) and originally released in Japan simply as Slayers (スレイヤーズ), is a 1995 film written by Kazuo Yamazaki, based on an original story by Hajime Kanzaka, and directed by Yamazaki and Hiroshi Watanabe.
- Slayers Return (スレイヤーズ RETURN, Sureiyāzu ritān), also known as Slayers Movie 2 - The Return, is a 1996 film written by Kanzaka and directed by Kunihiko Yuyama and Hiroshi Watanabe. It was adapted into a standalone manga.
- Slayers Great (スレイヤーズ ぐれえと, Sureiyāzu gurēto) is a 1997 film written by Kanzaka and directed by Kunihiko Yuyama, Hiroshi Watanabe and Yoshimatsu Takahiro.
- Slayers Gorgeous (スレイヤーズごうじゃす, Sureiyāzu gōjasu) is a 1998 film written by Kanzaka and directed by Hiroshi Watanabe.
- Slayers Premium (スレイヤーズぷれみあむ, Sureiyāzu puremiamu) is a 2001 short film written and directed by Junichi Satō.

Most of the films were produced by J.C.Staff and licensed for home video release in North America by ADV Films. Slayers Premium was animated by Hal Film Maker.

=== Original video animations ===
- The first OVA series, Slayers Special (スレイヤーズスペシャル), consists of three individual episodes directed by Hiroshi Watanabe. The first episode was released in Japan on July 25, 1996, by Kadokowa Shoten and J.C.Staff, approximately 10 months following broadcast of the final episode of the original anime series.
- A second three-episode OVA series, Slayers Excellent (スレイヤーズエクセレント) followed in 1998, also directed by Watanabe and produced by J.C.Staff.

In North America, Slayers Special was initially sold as two separate titles, Slayers: Dragon Slave and Slayers: Explosion Array on VHS by licensee ADV Films. All three episodes were later compiled into Slayers: The Book of Spells, shipped on November 21, 2000.

=== Radio dramas ===
- Slayers Extra aka Slayers EX (four episodes, loosely (with Gourry replacing Naga and set after the first season of the anime television series) adapted from Slayers Special novels, 1995–1996)
- Slayers N'extra (four episodes, adapted from Slayers Special novels, 1997)
- Slayers Premium (one episode, prologue and epilogue to Slayers Premium movie, 2002)
- Slayers VS Orphen (one episode, adapted from Slayers VS Orphen novel, 2005)
- The Return of Slayers EX (帰って来たスレイヤーズエクス, Kaette Kita Slayers EX) (three episodes, 2006)

=== Music ===
The background music for the anime was handled by Osamu Tezuka and Vink. As for the series' theme songs, the Slayers franchise has consistently featured Megumi Hayashibara as the primary performer of its theme songs for the television anime series, radio dramas, movies, and OVAs. In the original 1995 series, the opening and ending themes were "Get Along" and "Kujikenai Kara!", respectively, both performed by Hayashibara and Masami Okui. For Slayers Next in 1996, the opening theme was "Give a Reason" performed by Hayashibara, while the ending theme was "Jama wa Sasenai" performed by Okui. For Slayers Try in 1997, the opening theme was "Breeze" and the ending theme was "Don't Be Discouraged", both performed by Hayashibara, except for the final-episode ending theme "Somewhere", which was performed by Houko Kuwashima. The 2008 Slayers Revolution sequel brought back Hayashibara to sing both the opening "Plenty of Grit" and the ending "Revolution." The 2009 follow-up series Slayers Evolution-R also featured Hayashibara on the opening theme "Front Breaking," the ending theme "Sunadokei", and the final-episode ending theme "Just Begun."

The entire discography of Slayers was made available for digital streaming on September 10, 2025.

=== Games ===
==== Role-playing games ====
The series was adapted for two role-playing games (RPGs):

- Slayers became an add-on for the Japanese role-playing game system MAGIUS (Slayers MAGIUS RPG).
- In 2003, Guardians of Order published a licensed role-playing game, The Slayers d20, using the d20 System rules. Guardians also released three guidebooks for their Big Eyes, Small Mouth (BESM) game system that included game statistics for the TV series' major characters, spells and weapons.

==== Collectible card game ====
A collectible card game (CCG), Slayers Fight (スレイヤーズふぁいと), was developed by ORG and published by Kadokawa Shoten between 1999 and 2001.

==== Video games ====
A series of five Slayers role-playing video games were released exclusively in Japan between 1994 and 1998. Two different 16-bit games titled simply Slayers (including the one for the Super Famicom) were released in 1994. Three 32-bit / CD-ROM games followed in the late 1990s: Slayers Royal in 1997 and Slayers Royal 2 and Slayers Wonderful in 1998. In addition, Lina and other Slayers main characters have been featured in several other video games in crossover and guest appearances, in particular in mobile games since the late 2010s.

== Reception ==
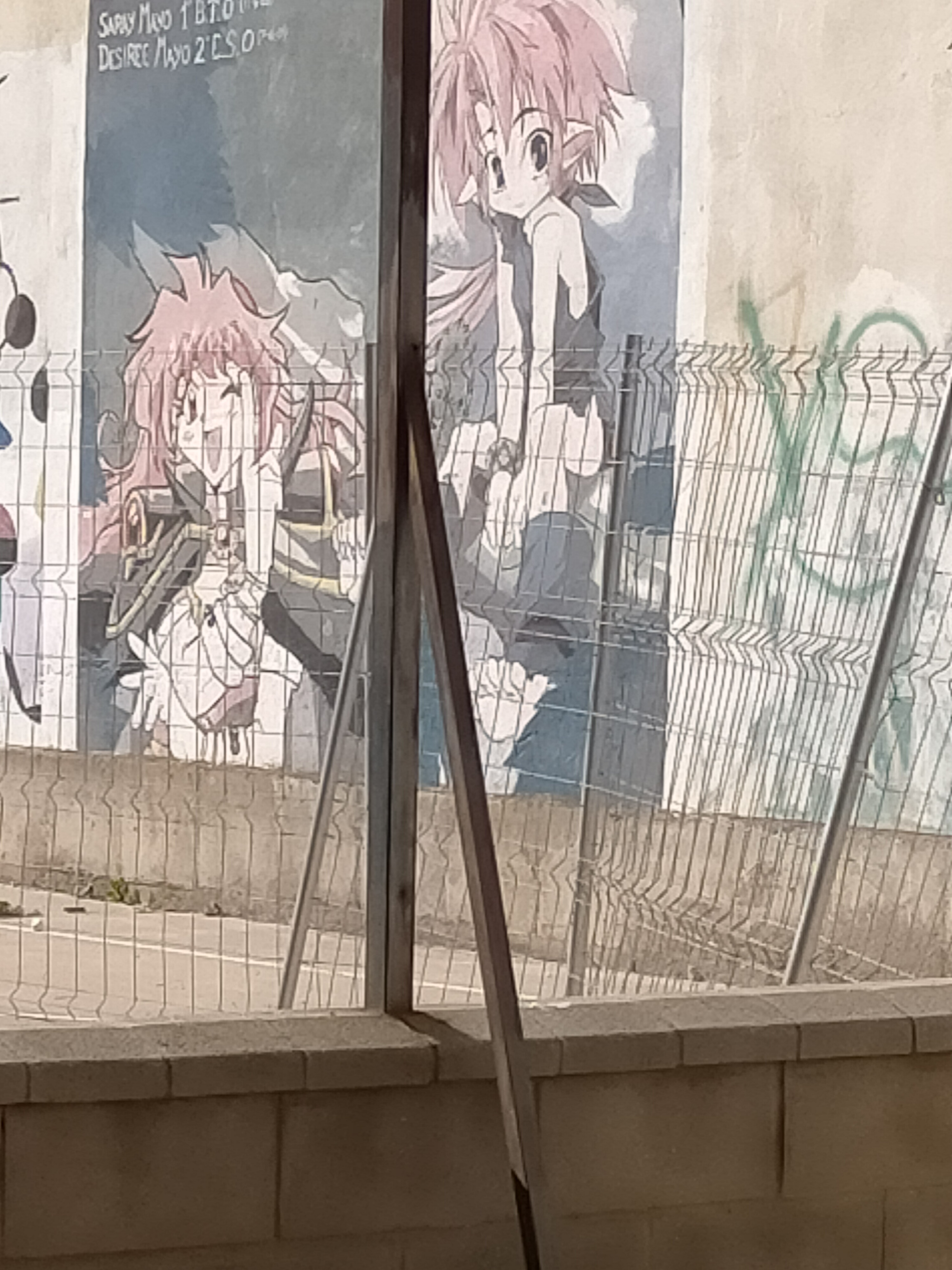
A Slayers themed mural featuring Lina Inverse in Seville, Spain. Along with Sailor Moon and Dragon Ball, Slayers was one of the most popular anime series in the country during the 1990s.

Including the spin-off series, the Slayers novels had 18 million copies in print by 2015. This number had grown to over 20 million copies by 2018. In January 2025, it was announced that the franchise had sold over 22 million copies, including digital sales. Writing in 2020, Iyane Agossah from DualShockers opined Slayers "is still rarely equaled 30 years later, with an incredible mix of comedy and tragedy, an intricate amount of world-building, great story developments and iconic characters."

Of the various media which make up the Slayers franchise, the anime has by far reached the largest audience and is considered to be one of the most popular series of the 1990s, both in Japan and abroad. As it is a parody of the high fantasy genre, the series' driving force lies in comic scenarios alluding to other specific anime, or more general genre tropes and clichés. Its focus on humor and entertainment and "old school" anime feel make it a nostalgic classic to many. According to Anime News Network's Daryl Surat, 1996 was the best year of Slayers anime with the releases of Next and Return. Slayers Next took the third place as the overall best anime of 1996 in the Anime Grand Prix '97 awards (in addition to winning in the category best female character), while the next year's series Slayers Try placed second but technically also third (the first place was a tie between the films Mononoke Hime and The End of Evangelion) in 1998.

Slayers was sometimes compared with Record of Lodoss War, another hit Japanese fantasy franchise that began around the same time. In Anime Essentials: Every Thing a Fan Needs to Know, Gilles Poitras wrote: "More humorous and less serious looking than the characters in the Lodoss War series, the stars of Slayers provide action and laughs." In The Anime Encyclopedia: A Guide to Japanese Animation Since 1917, Helen McCarthy similarly called it "the antidote to the deadly serious Record of Lodoss War, with a cynical cast modeled on argumentative role-players. (...) Ridiculing its own shortcomings, Slayers has successfully kept a strong following that watches for what some might call biting satire, and others bad workmen blaming their tools." Joseph Luster of Otaku USA called it "the very definition of an all-encompassing media franchise. (...) Slayers certainly has that in its memorable lineup, and they'll likely cast some sort of spell on you, regardless of age." Paul Thomas Chapman from the same magazine voiced a more reserved opinion on the "franchise whose remarkable longevity and popularity is matched only by its remarkable averageness," especially regarding various aspects of the TV series, to which nevertheless he returned for "light entertainment".

== See also ==
- List of Slayers songs
- Lost Universe, a science fiction comedy series set in one of the dimensions parallel to that of Slayers
