= Get Along (Megumi Hayashibara and Masami Okui song) =

- 8-cm CD single cover

Single by Megumi Hayashibara and Masami Okui
- Language: Japanese
- B-side: "Kujikenai Kara!"
- Released: May 24, 1995
- Genre: J-pop; anime song
- Length: 4:07
- Label: Starchild
- Composer: Hidetoshi Sato
- Lyricist: Satomi Arimori

Megumi Hayashibara singles chronology
"Touch and Go!!" (1994)	"Get Along" (1995)	"Midnight Blue" (1995)

Masami Okui singles chronology
"It's Destiny: Yatto Meguri Aeta" (1994)	"Get Along" (1996)	"Mask" (1995)

Audio
- "Get Along" on YouTube

"Get Along" is a song by Japanese voice actress and recording artist Megumi Hayashibara and singer Masami Okui, released as a single on May 24, 1995, via Starchild. The song served as the first opening theme for the anime television series Slayers.

== Background and release ==
Hayashibara and Okui were deliberately paired together by King Records producer Toshimichi Otsuki. Otsuki reportedly told Hayashibara that while her expressiveness was limitless, she lacked singing abilities, and that teaming with a "real singer" like Okui would help her learn proper vocal delivery and what "it truly meant" to sing. When Otsuki offered Masami Okui to work with Hayashibara, her main line of work was as of a studio vocalist, recording choruses and doing vocal guidance.

The recording session for "Get Along" were conducted in the same booth at a King Records studio, with the two artists facing each other and separated only by a partition to capture a live, spontaneous energy rather than the typical isolated vocal takes. Okui recalled the session as fun and memorable, despite describing the promotional video footage shot in the same studio as "pretty cheesy." She noted that "Get Along" stood out at the time as a comparatively rare example of a wild, cool, high-energy duet performed by two women in the anisong genre. Hayashibara described working with Okui as her genuine starting point in seriously confronting singing. She commented that prior to working with Okui, she had somewhat used her identity as a "voice actress" as an excuse to hold back from fully committing to music; but Okui's direct engagement to her singing career instilled in Hayashibara a sense of responsibility toward releasing music, a refusal to make excuses, and the simple joy of performing.

The song features upbeat synth pop-rock elements that complement the themes of the Slayers anime. A distinctive element is the inclusion of spoken dialogue from Hayashibara in her role as the series' protagonist Lina Inverse at the beginning of the TV anime version. This spoken intro was omitted from the standard single release but it is included on various soundtrack listed as the "album version."

For the single release, the song was coupled with "Kujikenai Kara!", (Note: Stylized as "KUJIKENAIKARA!" on the Japanese release.) which was used as ending theme for the same series.

In 2006, Hayashibara released a solo version of "Get Along" which was included as a B-side on her Slayers commemorative single "Meet Again." This version, along with the original and "Kujikenai Kara!", were later included on her Slayers theme song compilation albums Slayers Megumix (2008) and Slayers Megumixxx (2020). In 2023, as part of her 30th solo debut anniversary celebrations, Okui included a new solo self-cover of "Get Along" on her best-of compilation album Mas“ami Okui”terpiece.

The original single was made available for streaming worldwide on March 30, 2021, along with the entire Megumi Hayashibara discography.

== Commercial performance ==
"Give a Reason" debuted at number 38 on the Oricon charts, selling 19,620 copies on its first week. The single then climbed to number 36 on the following week, with 16,990 copies sold. The single charted for eight weeks in total, with reported sales amounting to 76,800 copies.

== Track listing ==
All lyrics are written by Satomi Arimori.

CD single/digital release track listing
No.	Title	Music	Arrangement	Length
1.	"Get Along"	Hidetoshi Sato	Tsutomu Ohira	4:07
2.	"Kujikenai Kara!"	Masami Okui	Toshiro Yabuki	4:33
3.	"Get Along" (off vocal version)			4:07
4.	"Jama wa Sasenai" (off vocal version)			4:33

== Charts ==
Weekly chart performance for "Get Along"
Chart (1995)	Peak position
Japan (Oricon)	36
