= Mazoku =

Evil supernatural beings in Japanese lore

In Japanese mythology and fantasy, mazoku (魔族) are supernatural beings, normally evil ones such as devils or demons. A maō (魔王) or maou is a ruler of mazoku, or in fiction more generically a dark lord or powerful monster.

== Etymology ==
The name ma (魔 – devil) suggests that they are meant to threaten human existence or defy the gods, while -zoku (族 – kin, clan, family) indicates that they are a family.

Maō (魔王) is a term derived from mazoku, suggesting a king (王 Ō – king, ruler) that rules the mazoku.

== In mythology and folklore ==
The term "mazoku" was used to describe the asura and yaksha in Hindu mythology, as well as Zoroastrianism's daeva. It is a general term for devils, demons and evil beings. In Japanese polytheism, it is an antonym of 神族 (shinzoku), "the kin of gods".

A maō is a king or ruler over mazoku. For instance, in Bible translations, Satan is a maō. In polytheism, the counterpart of maō is 神王 (shin'ō), "the kin of gods".

The Japanese feudal lord Oda Nobunaga also called himself a maō in a letter to Takeda Shingen, signing it with 第六天魔王 ("the demon king of the sixth heaven").

== In fiction ==
In Japanese fantasy, the meaning of "mazoku" differs from work to work. Some works use the term for all evil beings that are enemies of humans or good beings, while others use it to specify a certain group of beings (not necessarily evil). The term 悪魔族 (akumazoku) may be used to designate evil mazoku specifically (the word 悪, aku, means "evil").

A maō may be a king of the mazoku, or more generally a king of demons, overlord, dark lord, archenemy of the hero or video game boss. The term is not gender-specific. For instance, "Erlkönig", by Johann Wolfgang von Goethe, widely translated as "Elf King" in English, was translated as "maō" in Japanese. The term daimaō or daimaou (大魔王 – great demon king) is sometimes used to describe a very high-ranking or powerful maō. An example is Piccolo Daimaō, a villain from the Dragon Ball manga.
