= Give a Reason =

- 8-cm CD single cover

Single by Megumi Hayashibara

from the album Bertemu
- Language: Japanese
- B-side: "Jama wa Sasenai"
- Released: April 24, 1996
- Genre: J-pop; anime song
- Length: 4:26
- Label: Starchild
- Composer: Hidetoshi Sato
- Lyricist: Satomi Arimori

Megumi Hayashibara singles chronology
"Going History" (1995)	"Give a Reason" (1996)	"Kagiri nai Yokubō no Naka ni" (1996)

Masami Okui singles chronology
"Shake It" (1996)	"Jama wa Sasenai" (1996)	"Naked Mind" (1996)

Audio
- "Give a Reason" on YouTube

"Give a Reason" is a song by Japanese voice actress and recording artist Megumi Hayashibara. Written by Hidetoshi Sato with lyrics by Satomi Arimori, the song was released as Hayashibara's tenth single on April 24, 1996, via Starchild. The song is considered one of Hayashibara's signature songs, being recognized as a pivotal song that helped establish voice actors as widely supported artists in their own right.

== Background and release ==
"Give a Reason" was used as opening theme for the anime series Slayers Next, series in which Hayashibara also voices the main character, Lina Inverse. In 2009, the song was again used on the Slayers anime franchise, this time as an insert song on the sequel Slayers Evolution-R, nine years after its original release.

For the single release, the song was coupled with "Jama wa Sasenai" by Masami Okui, which was used as ending theme for the same series.

The single was made available for streaming worldwide on March 30, 2021, along with the entire Megumi Hayashibara discography.

== Commercial performance ==
"Give a Reason" debuted and peaked at number 9 on the Oricon charts, becoming Hayashibara's highest charting single at the time and selling 70,180 copies on its first week. The single charted for thirteen weeks, with reported sales totaling 232,950 copies.

The single was certified gold by the Recording Industry Association of Japan.

== Impact and legacy ==
"Give a Reason" marked a significant milestone in the history of anime music and voice actor recording artists, as it became the first music release by a voice actress to enter the Top 10 of the Japanese charts. This achievement broke new ground for songs sung by voice actors, which had previously rarely achieved high chart positions with anime theme songs or related releases. The success of "Give a Reason" served as a pivotal step that helped pave the way for the subsequent rise of voice actress music in the mainstream Japanese music industry, which subsequently led to Nana Mizuki's album Ultimate Diamond reaching number one on Oricon, illustrating the growing dominance of voice actresses and anime songs in the charts and contributing to the foundation of the modern era of idol voice actresses.

The song also received the Voice Actor/Actress Song Award in the Heisei Anison Grand Prize for the 1989–1999 period.

== Cover versions ==
"Give a Reason" has been covered by several other artists. Masami Okui recorded her own version of the song for her cover album Masami Kobushi (2003); Haruko Momoi included her own take on the song for her cover album More & More Quality Red: Anime Song Cover (2008); Chihiro Yonekura recorded a new version of the for her cover album Ever After (2008); Eri Kitamura covered the song for the compilation album Hyakka Seiran: Jōsei Seiyū Hen II (2008); Ryōko Shintani covered the song for the compilation album Hyakka Seiran: Jōsei Seiyū Hen III (2009); m.o.v.e recorded their own cover of the song for their the album Anim.o.v.e 01 (2009); Shoko Nakagawa also covered the song on her album Shokotan Cover 3: Anison wa Jinrui wo Tsunagu (2010);

In 2021, voice actress Reina Ueda covered the song as the character Juna Doma for the television anime series How a Realist Hero Rebuilt the Kingdom. The track was used as insert song during the third episode of the series.

== Track listing ==
Give a Reason single track listing
No.	Title	Lyrics	Music	Arrangement	Length
1.	"Give a Reason"	Satomi Arimori	Hidetoshi Sato	Tsutomu Ohira	4:24
2.	"Jama wa Sasenai" (邪魔はさせない)	Masami Okui	Okui; Toshiro Yabuki	Yabuki	4:38
3.	"Give a Reason" (Off Vocal Version)				4:56
4.	"Jama wa Sasenai" (Off Vocal Version)				4:38

== Personnel ==
Credits adapted from the liner notes of the CD single.

- Megumi Hayashibara – lead vocals, chorus (1)
- Masami Okui - lead vocals (2), chorus (1, 2)
- Tsutomu Ohira - arrangements, mixing, computer programming, keyboard (1)
- Toshiro Yabuki - guitar (1), arrangements, mixing, computer programming, keyboard, guitar (2)
- Kenji Soeda - guitar (1)
- Masahiro Fujioka - saxophone (2)
- Keiko Kajimoto - chorus (1)
- Yukako Yagyu - chorus (1)
- Koh-chan - chorus (2)
- Masaya Yagyu - chorus (2)
- Takeshi Soeda - chorus (2)
- Kenji Soeda - chorus (2)
- Yuichi Nagayama - mixing (1, 2)

== Charts ==
=== Weekly charts ===
Weekly chart performance for "Give a Reason"
Chart (1996)	Peak position
Japan (Oricon)	9

=== Year-end charts ===
Year-end chart performance for "Give a Reason"
Chart (1996)	Position
Japan (Oricon)	130

== Certifications ==
Region	Certification	Certified units/sales
Japan (RIAJ) Physical	Gold	200,000^{^}
Japan (RIAJ) Digital	Gold	100,000^{*}
^{*} Sales figures based on certification alone.^{^} Shipments figures based on certification alone.
