= Starchild (label) =

Japanese record label

- Parent company: King Records
- Founded: 1981
- Founder: Junji Fujita (藤田 純二, Fujita Junji)
- Defunct: January 31, 2016
- Status: Closed on 31 January 2016 and absorbed into the anime division of King Records and renamed King Amusement Creative
- Genre: Anime; Voice acting Live action Movies; Dramas
- Country of origin: Japan

Starchild (スターチャイルド, Sutāchairudo) was a Japanese record label within the company, King Records that primarily dealt with anime, voice acting, live action movies and dramas from 1981 to 2016. Its official name was Starchild Records (スターチャイルドレコード, Sutāchairudo Rekōdo). The nickname of the label in Japanese was スタチャ (Sutacha). As an internal brand of King Records, it wielded a strong influence over fans with the help of popular singers and voice actors like Megumi Hayashibara.

The company was succeeded by King's new company King Amusement Creative since 2016.

== See also ==
- King Records 3rd Creativity Division, the former anime-related division of King Records
- Gansis, an anime production company closely related to King Records
