= Northern Lights =

Northern lights most commonly refers to the aurora borealis, a natural light display in Earth's sky.

(The) Northern Light(s) may also refer to:

== Arts and entertainment ==
=== Film ===
- Northern Lights (1938 film), a German adventure film directed by Herbert B. Fredersdorf
- Northern Lights (1978 film), about the Nonpartisan League in North Dakota
- Northern Lights (1997 film), a Disney movie
- Northern Lights (2001 film), a Russian film
- Northern Lights (2009 film), or Nora Roberts' Northern Lights, a TV film
- Northern Light (film), a 2006 Dutch film
- Northern Lights: A Journey to Love, a 2017 Filipino drama

=== Television and radio ===
- Northern Lights (TV series), a 2006 British comedy-drama series
- "Northern Lights" (Dawson's Creek), a 2000 television episode
- Northern Lights (radio show), a Canadian programme until 2007
- Northern Lights, a fictional element in the TV series Person of Interest

=== Literature ===
- Northern Lights (Pullman novel), by Philip Pullman, 1995
- Northern Lights (O'Brien novel), by Tim O'Brien, 1975
- Northern Lights, a 2009 novel by Nora Roberts, on which the 2009 film is based
- Severni sij ('Northern Lights'), a 1984 novel and 2005 play by Drago Jančar
- A Northern Light, a 2003 historical novel by Jennifer Donnelly
- The Northern Light (college newspaper), of the University of Alaska Anchorage
- The Northern Light (Maine), a weekly newspaper
- The Northern Light (novel), by A. J. Cronin, 1958
- The Northern Lights, a 1991 novel by Howard Norman
- The Northern Lights, a 2002 biography of Kristian Birkeland by Lucy Jago

=== Music ===
- Northern lights chord, an 11-note chord
- Northern Lights (bluegrass band), an American group
- Northern Lights (Canadian band), a 1985 supergroup that recorded "Tears Are Not Enough"
- Toronto Northern Lights, a Canadian men's chorus
- Hootenanny Singers, or The Northern Lights, a Swedish folk group

==== Albums ====
- Northern Light (Ask Embla album) (2013)
- Northern Light (Jon Christos album) (2005)
- Northern Light (Covenant album) (2002)
- Northern Lights (Gareth Emery album) (2010)
- Northern Lights (Northern Lights album)
- Northern Lights (Sissel album) (2007)
- Northern Lights – Southern Cross, a 1975 album by the Band
- Northern Lights, a 1996 EP by Klaus Waldeck
- Northern Lights, a 2016 album by Zeds Dead

==== Songs ====
- "Northern Light" (song), by Basshunter, 2012
- Northern Lights (Death Cab for Cutie song), 2018
- "Northern Lights", by Dala from Everyone Is Someone, 2009
- "Northern Lights", by DZ Deathrays, 2014
- "Northern Lights", by Ella Henderson from her second album Everything I Didn't Say, 2022
- "Northern Lights", by Goldenhorse from Riverhead, 2002
- "Northern Lights", by Hunter Brothers from State of Mind, 2019
- "Northern Lights" (Megumi Hayashibara song), 2002
- "Northern Lights" (Renaissance song), 1978
- "Northern Lights", by St. Vincent from Strange Mercy, 2011
- "Northern Lights", by Soft Cell, 2018
- "Northern Lights", by Thirty Seconds to Mars from Love, Lust, Faith and Dreams, 2013
- "Northern Lights", by Timo Tolkki from Classical Variations and Themes, 1994
- "Northern Lights", by Sentenced from North from Here, 1993
- "Northern Lites", by Super Furry Animals, 1999

== Businesses and organisations ==
- Northern Lights Casino, in Prince Albert, Saskatchewan, Canada
- Northern Lights College, in British Columbia, Canada
- Northern Lights Community School, in Warba, Minnesota, U.S.
- Northern Light Group, an American knowledge management company
  - its "Northern Light", an early Web search engine (1996–2002)
- Northern Lights Secondary School, in Moosonee, Ontario, Canada
- Northern Lights Shopping Center, in Economy, Pennsylvania, U.S.

== Transportation ==
- Northern Light (clipper), an American ship 1851–1862
- Northern Light (sternwheeler), active on Puget Sound in the 1900s
- Northern Light (pilot boat), an American pilot boat
- SS Northern Lights, later SS El Faro, an American cargo ship
- Northern Lights (train), a named British passenger train
- Northern Lights Express, a proposed American passenger train
- Northern Light (spacecraft), a concept mission for a robotic mission to Mars

== Other uses ==
- Northern Lights (cannabis), a strain of cannabis
- Northern Lights (carbon capture project), in Norway
- Northern Lights (football team), in New Zealand
- Northern Lights (pipeline), in Russia and Belarus
- The Northern Lights (whiskey), a blended Canadian whisky
- Northern Lights suplex, a move in professional wrestling
- Northern Lights, a codename an eMac computer model
- County of Northern Lights, a municipal district in Alberta, Canada
- Operation Northern Lights, a 2006 U.S. military operation in Iraq

== See also ==
- The Golden Compass (film), a 2007 film adaption Northern Lights by Philip Pullman
- Noorderlicht, meaning Northern Light, an annual Dutch photographic festival
- Northern Lighthouse Board, formerly Commissioners of Northern Light Houses, the lighthouse authority for Scotland
- Northern Lights Cathedral, in Troms county, Norway
- Northern Lights Council of the Boy Scouts of America
- Southern Lights (disambiguation)
