= Brave Heart (Megumi Hayashibara song) =

2001 single by Megumi Hayashibara

Single by Megumi Hayashibara

from the album Feel Well
- Language: Japanese
- B-side: "Kirameku Kakera"; "Brave Heart" (moonlit version)
- Released: December 29, 2001
- Genre: J-pop; anime song
- Length: 4:14
- Label: Starchild
- Composer: Michihiko Ohta
- Lyricist: Megumi
- Producer: Tomoji Sogawa

Megumi Hayashibara singles chronology
"Feel Well" (2001)	"Brave Heart" (2001)	"Northern Lights" (2002)

Audio
- "Brave Heart" on YouTube

"Brave Heart" is a song by Japanese voice actress and recording artist Megumi Hayashibara. Written by Michihiko Ohta with lyrics penned by Hayashibara, (Note: Under the alias "Megumi" stylized in all caps.) the song was used as an insert song in the 2001 anime adaptation of Shaman King, and was released as a single on December 29, 2001, via Starchild.

== Background and release ==
"Brave Heart" was the third single released by Hayashibara in 2001, and her second single associated with the Shaman King franchise following "Over Soul." It is also the first and only song by Hayashibara composed by Michihiko Ohta. (Note: Ohta also wrote the Digimon Adventure song of the same name performed by Ayumi Miyazaki; however, both tracks are completely unrelated.) The song was primarily used during battle scenes on the Shaman King anime series, and it is characterized by its initial moderate and slow tempo, which then gradually builds up momentum toward the chorus and climax.

The physical single was released on December 29, 2001, which included the original and an alternative version of "Brave Heart", credited as the "moonlit version," in addition to the B-side "Kirameku Kakera" written by Sora Izumikawa. The original version of the song was included on the Hayashibara's tenth studio album Feel Well released on June 26, 2002, while a rearranged take of the "moonlit version"—entitled the "moon shake version"—was included on the 2004 album Center Color.

The original single was made available for streaming on March 30, 2021, along with the entire Megumi Hayashibara discography.

== Commercial performance ==
The single debuted and peaked at number 11 on the Oricon charts, selling 40,390 copies on its first week. It charted for seven weeks, with cumulative reported sales totaling 63,800 copies.

== Track listing ==
CD single/digital release track listing
No.	Title	Lyrics	Music	Arrangement	Length
1.	"Brave Heart"	Megumi	Michihiko Ohta	Tomoji Sogawa	4:14
2.	"Kirameku Kakera" (きらめくかけら, lit. 'Shining Fragment')	Sora Izumikawa	Izumikawa	Sogawa	4:43
3.	"Brave Heart" (moonlit version)	Megumi	Ohta	Sogawa	4:26
4.	"Brave Heart" (instrumental)				4:14
5.	"Kirameku Kakera" (instrumental)				4:43
6.	"Brave Heart" (moonlit version) (instrumental)				4:24

== Personnel ==
Credits adapted from the liner notes of the CD single.

- Megumi Hayashibara - vocals, lyrics, chorus
- Tomoji Sogawa - arrangements, recording producer
- Go Takahashi - chorus
- Hiroyuki Tsuji - vocals recording engineer
- Koji Morimoto - recording, mixing engineer
- Akira Ando - mastering
- Toshimichi Otsuki - executive producer

== Charts ==
Weekly chart performance for "Brave Heart"
Chart (2002)	Peak position
Japan (Oricon)	11
