= Southern Lights =

The Southern Lights most often refers to the Aurora australis.

(The) Southern Lights may also refer to:

- Southern Lights (novel), by Danielle Steel, 2009
- Southern Lights (album), by SJD, 2004
- Southern Lights: Overexposed, a 2015 multimedia album by Alex Faith and Dre Murray
- "The Southern Lights", an episode of animated TV series The Legend of Korra
- Southern Lights (kinetic-light sculpture)

== See also ==
- Northern Lights (disambiguation)
- Southern Light Films, New Zealand film production company, responsible for the 2020 miniseries The Luminaries
- Southern Light Opera Company, a Scottish operatic society
- Southern Lights Suplex, a wrestling move and variation of the leg hook belly-to-back suplex
