= Joan Feynman =

American astrophysicist (1927–2020)

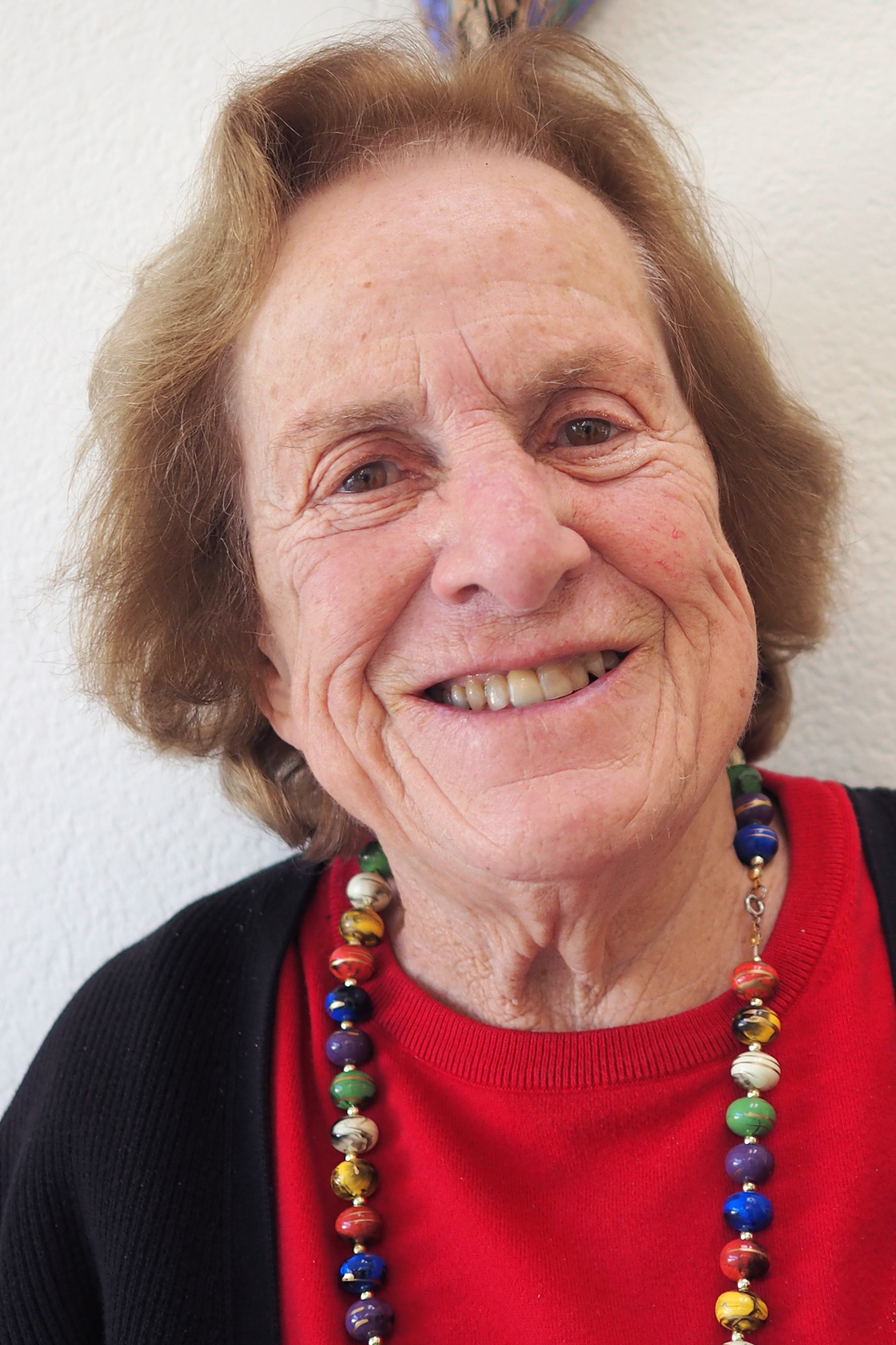
- January 2015
- Born: March 31, 1927; Queens, New York, U.S.
- Died: July 21, 2020 (aged 93); Ventura, California, U.S.
- Education: Oberlin College (BS); Syracuse University (MS, PhD)
- Known for: work on auroras, solar wind
- Spouse(s): Richard Hirshberg (m. 1948; div. 1974) Alexander Ruzmaikin (m. 1987)
- Children: 3
- Awards: NASA Exceptional Achievement Medal
- Scientific career
- Fields: Astrophysics
- Workplaces: National Center for Atmospheric Research, National Science Foundation, Boston College, Jet Propulsion Laboratory
- Thesis: “Absorption of Infrared Radiation in Crystals of Diamond-Type Lattice Structure” (1958)
- Doctoral advisor: Melvin Lax

Joan Feynman (March 31, 1927 – July 21, 2020) was an American astrophysicist and space physicist who contributed to the study of solar wind particles and fields, sun-Earth relations, and magnetospheric physics. She created a model that predicts the number of high-energy particles likely to hit a spacecraft over its lifetime, and uncovered a method for predicting sunspot cycles. She was known for illuminating the origin of auroras.

== Early life ==
Feynman was raised in the Far Rockaway section of Queens, New York City, along with her elder brother, Richard Feynman (who became a Nobel Prize-winning physicist). Her parents were Lucille Feynman (née Phillips), a homemaker, and Melville Arthur Feynman, a businessman. Her parents, both Ashkenazi Jews, originated from Minsk, Belarus (then in Russian Empire) and Poland.

Joan was an inquisitive child, and she exhibited an interest in understanding the natural world from an early age. However, her mother told her, "Women's brains can't do science." Despite this, her brother Richard always encouraged her to be curious about the universe. "Richard was my first teacher", she recalled. Richard introduced young Joan to auroras when, one night, he coaxed her out of bed to witness the Northern Lights flickering above an empty golf course near their home. Later, Joan found comfort in an astronomy book given to her by her brother. She became convinced that she could, in fact, study science, when she came across a graph based on research by astronomer Cecilia Payne-Gaposchkin. She found inspiration in Proverbs, which says a virtuous woman "considereth a field, and buyeth it: with the fruit of her hands she planteth a vineyard."

== Education ==
Feynman attended Oberlin College, where she helped create the first Jewish student congregation. She earned a bachelor's degree in physics from Oberlin in 1948. That year, she married the anthropologist Richard Hirshberg. She later attended Syracuse University, where she studied solid state theory in the physics department under Melvin Lax. During her graduate years, Feynman took a year off to live with her husband in Guatemala, where they studied the anthropology of the Maya peoples. She was a co-author, along with her husband and Betty J. Meggers, of a 1957 paper on anthropology. Feynman eventually earned her doctorate in physics in 1958. Her thesis was “Absorption of Infrared Radiation in Crystals of Diamond-Type Lattice Structure”. She also completed postdoctoral work at Columbia University's Lamont Geological Observatory.

== Career ==
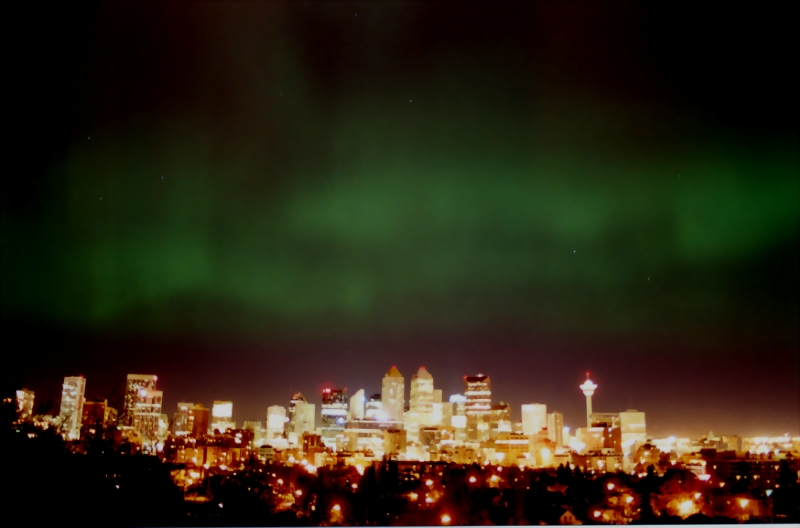
An aurora display over Calgary

Joan Feynman spent the bulk of her career studying the interactions between the solar wind and the Earth's magnetosphere. While working at the NASA Ames Research Center in 1971, Feynman discovered that the periodic spouting of solar material known as a solar coronal mass ejection (CME) could be identified by the presence of helium in the solar wind. This was an important find because, although CME's were known at the time, they had until then been difficult to detect.

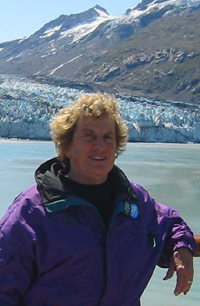
Joan Feynman

After her time at NASA Ames, Feynman moved on to research posts with the High Altitude Observatory; the National Center for Atmospheric Research in Boulder, Colorado; the National Science Foundation in Washington, DC; and Boston College in Massachusetts. In 1985 Feynman accepted a position at the Jet Propulsion Laboratory in Pasadena, California, where she remained until her retirement.

Feynman made a critical discovery about the nature and cause of auroras. Using data collected by NASA spacecraft Explorer 33, she demonstrated that the occurrence of auroras is a product of the interaction between the Earth's magnetosphere and the magnetic field of the solar wind.

Feynman helped to develop a model for estimating the environmental hazards of the local space environment. High-velocity coronal mass ejections are known to cause geomagnetic storms, which can have dangerous effects on both spacecraft and on humans in space. Fast-moving coronal mass ejections cause shock waves in the solar wind, speeding up solar particles and instigating geomagnetic storms as the particles arrive at the outer edge of Earth's magnetosphere. Often, the commencement of such storms is coupled with a high influx of protons, which can wreak havoc on communications systems and space flight activities. Feynman's model ultimately helped engineers determine the flux of high-energy particles that would affect a spacecraft over its functional lifetime. Her work in this area led to important new developments in spacecraft design.

Later in her career, Feynman studied climate change. She was particularly interested in transient solar events and solar cycle variations. She studied the influence of the sun on patterns of wintertime climate anomalies known as the Arctic oscillation or North Annular Mode (NAM). Together with her colleague and husband Alexander Ruzmaikin, she found that during periods of lower solar activity, the NAM index is systematically lower. Such periods of low solar activity coincide with cooling periods for certain parts of the world, for example, in Europe during the Little Ice Age. Feynman and her colleagues also discovered a link between solar variability and climate change in ancient water levels of the Nile River. During periods of high solar activity, conditions around the Nile were found to be drier, and when solar activity was low, conditions were wetter.

In 1974, Feynman became the first woman to be elected as an officer of the American Geophysical Union (AGU). She organized an AGU committee charged with advancing the fair treatment of women within the geophysics community. Feynman was a long-standing member of the International Astronomical Union. She was a member of a number of the IAU's subdivisions, including Division E Sun and Heliosphere, Division G Stars and Stellar Physics, and Division E Commission 49 Interplanetary Plasma & Heliosphere.

Feynman retired from the Jet Propulsion Laboratory as a senior scientist in 2003. However, she continued to work, publishing in 2009 on the influence of solar activity on the climate of the first millennium.

During her career, Feynman was an author or co-author of more than 100 scientific publications and edited three scientific books. She continued to publish until 2017. She asked, "How could I retire when the sun is doing such crazy things?"

== Awards and honors ==
Feynman was twice elected secretary of the Solar and Interplanetary Physics Section of the American Geophysical Union.

In 2002, Feynman was named as one of the Jet Propulsion Laboratory's elite senior research scientists.

In 2000, she was awarded NASA's Exceptional Achievement Medal.

== Personal life ==
Feynman had one daughter, Susan Hirshberg, and two sons, Charles Hirshberg and Matt Hirshberg, from her first marriage, to anthropologist Richard Irwin Hirshberg (born 1924). Feynman met Hirshberg at Oberlin College, and they married in 1948, separated in 1974, and later divorced. Feynman was married to fellow astrophysicist Alexander Ruzmaikin from 1987 until her death.

She died on July 21, 2020, at age 93.
