= Patrick Brayer =

American singer-songwriter

Patrick John Brayer is an American singer-songwriter within the Inland Empire music scene.

== Early life and education ==
Brayer is the son of Raplh W. and Eleanore Brayer. In 1958, his family relocated to rural Fontana, California, where they operated an egg ranch, and where Brayer attended Fontana High School. Brayer's elder brother, Michael Brayer, also sings.

== Career ==
In the 1970s, Brayer played in bands including Lost Highway, which he formed with Walden Dahl and Dave Dickey, the Town and Country Boys, also with Dahl, and the High Window Boys. Brayer plays guitar, fiddle, mandolin and other stringed instruments, and has collaborated with bluegrass, country, and folk artists including Alison Krauss, Alan Jackson, Ben Harper, and Stuart Duncan.

In the early 1980s, Brayer founded Starvation Cafe in Fontana, as a coffeehouse with scheduled musicians and open mic sessions. Performers included Ben Harper, Mike McClellan, Blind Joe Hill and John York. In a forward to the book Always a Song, Ben Harper noted that a performance at the Starvation Café served to solidify his decision to transition from playing as a band member for Taj Mahal to becoming a signed solo artist. Brayer also hosted a radio program, Starvation Café Radio Archives, from the University of California, Riverside, and was the first signing on Ben Harper's Inland Emperor Records label.

Three of his songs were recorded by Smithsonian Folkways records as part of the Fast Folk Magazine, including Bourbon as a Second Language (2002), Straight Life, No Chaser, and Funeral Town (1995). Brayer co-wrote the song So Long, So Wrong with Walden Dahl, which was covered by Alison Krauss on the album of the same name in 1997. His song Lonely Moon was covered by Stuart Duncan in 1992 and by Northern Lights on their album New Moon in 2005. He also wrote the song, (Good) Imitation of the Blues, which was covered by Larry Sparks & the Lonesome Ramblers in 1983, John Doe in 1990, Chris Darrow on Slide On In in 2002, Orville Johnson in 2004 and Alan Jackson in 2006 on the album Like Red on a Rose. The album went Gold in 2007.

Brayer released a series of cassettes and CDs, entitled The Secret Hits of Patrick Brayer some of the songs were recorded in the kitchen of Dennis Hopper. In providing guidance to aspiring song-writers, Jeffery Pepper Rodgers of Acoustic Guitar magazine described Brayer's underground song-writing and production style in this series as one way to focus on the process and work of songwriting rather than final products.

== Discography ==
- 1979 - Cold Feelings, reissued 1993 by Eye of the Scarecrow Records
- 2000 - Sinner Songwriter, AIM
- 2001 - Catholic And Western Fabuli, Inland Emperor Records
- 2022 - Cabbage and Kings: an Inland Shrimpire Anthology, Shrimper Records
