= Can't Buy Your Way =

Studio album by Northern Lights
- Released: 1991
- Recorded: 1991
- Genre: Bluegrass, progressive bluegrass
- Length: 48:13
- Label: Flying Fish Records
- Producer: Bill VornDick, Northern Lights

Northern Lights chronology
Take You to the Sky (1990)	Can't Buy Your Way (1991)	Wrong Highway Blues (1994)

Professional ratings
Review scores
Source	Rating
Allmusic	3/5 stars

Can't Buy Your Way is album by the progressive bluegrass band Northern Lights.

== Track listing ==
1. Can't Buy Your Way (Armerding) 4:56
2. My Only One (Mellyn) 3:57
3. Lighthouse (Taylor) 4:13
4. When the Time Had Fully Come (Armerding) 2:46
5. September's End (Henry) 3:58
6. Rainmaker (Nicholson, Rowan) 5:17
7. City on a Hill (Armerding) 3:14
8. Take You Back Again (Armerding) 3:14
9. Heartache Tonight (Frey, Henley, Seeger, Souther) 3:03
10. Shake This Feeling (Henry) 2:54
11. Jubilation (Kropp) 4:11
12. Anger and Tears (Chase, Smith) 3:42
13. On the Edge (Armerding) 2:48

== Personnel ==
- Taylor Armerding - mandolin, guitar, vocals
- Jeff Horton - bass, vocals
- Bill Henry - vocals, guitar
- Mike Kropp - banjo, guitar

with

- Matt Glaser - violin
- Vassar Clements - violin
- Stuart Duncan - violin
