= Jake Armerding =

American musician

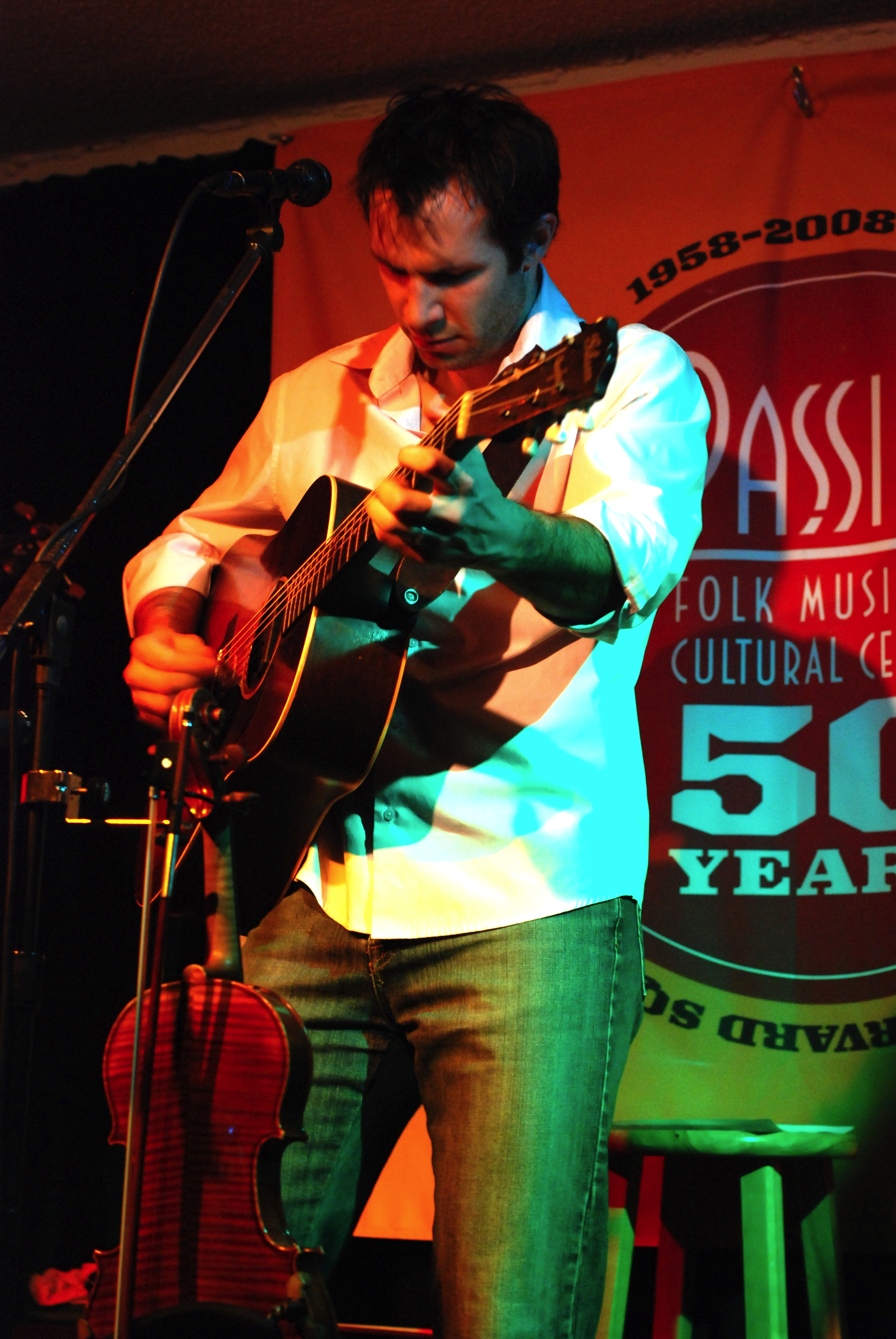
Jake Armerding in February 2009

Jake Armerding is an American folk musician and multi-instrumentalist from Boston, Massachusetts. He plays mostly acoustic string instruments like the mandolin, acoustic guitar, and fiddle. In 1990, Jake began playing with Northern Lights occasionally, along with his father, Taylor Armerding. He joined the band full-time in 1992 and was a member until 1999 when he left the band to pursue a solo career. Jake attended Wheaton College where he received a degree in English literature. In 2001, Armerding won the Best New Artist Award from Boston's folk-radio station, WUMB.

In addition to his solo efforts, Jake makes up half of a duo, The Fretful Porcupine, along with saxophonist Kevin Gosa. Armerding is also a member of Barnstar!, a "bluegrass [band] for people who hate bluegrass." He is on the faculty of the Traditional Music Project housed at the Real School of Music in Burlington, Massachusetts.

Jake recently played violin and mandolin as part of an ensemble recording music for the audiobook version of Josh Ritter's first novel, Bright's Passage.

== Notable Performances ==
Jake has made multiple appearances at The Kennedy Center in Washington, D.C.

== Discography ==
Northern Lights

- 1994 - Wrong Highway Blues
- 1996 - Living in the City

Solo

- 1999 - Caged Bird
- 2003 - Jake Armerding (released by Compass Records)
- 2007 - Walking on the World
- 2009 - Songs in Stained Glass
- 2009 - Her
- 2013 - Cosmos in the Chaos
- 2015 - Your Voice Like Brake Lights: A Collection

The Fretful Porcupine

- 2010 - Cellar Sessions EP

Barnstar!

- 2011 - C'mon!
- 2015 - Sit Down! Get Up! Get Out!

Rosin

- 2017 - Rosin

Contributions

- 2005 - Mark Stepakoff - There Goes the Neighborhood (fiddle)
- 2006 - Scott Alarik - All That Is True: Folk Songs Old and New
- 2009 - Taylor Armerding - Head That Way (fiddle and voice)
