= Northern Lights (Megumi Hayashibara song) =

2002 single by Megumi Hayashibara

Single by Megumi Hayashibara

from the album Center Color
- Language: Japanese
- B-side: "Omokage"
- Released: March 27, 2002
- Genre: J-pop; anime song
- Length: 3:31
- Label: Starchild
- Composer: Go Takahashi
- Lyricist: Megumi
- Producer: Go Takahashi

Megumi Hayashibara singles chronology
"Brave Heart" (2001)	"Northern Lights" (2002)	"Treat or Goblins" (2002)

Audio
- "Northern Lights" on YouTube

"Northern Lights" is a song by Japanese voice actress and recording artist Megumi Hayashibara. Written by Go Takahashi with lyrics penned by Hayashibara, (Note: Under the alias "Megumi" stylized in all caps.) the song served as the second opening theme for the television anime series Shaman King, and was released as a single on March 27, 2002, via Starchild. For the single release, the song was coupled with "Omokage", which was used as the second ending theme for the same series.

== Background and release ==
"Northern Lights" is the second opening theme performed by Hayashibara for the Shaman King anime series, following "Over Soul." (Note: It is the third single by Hayashibara associated with the Shaman King anime series, following "Over Soul" and "Brave Heart.") The song is characterized for featuring stronger rock influence compared to "Over Soul," with Hayashibara's vocal delivery characterized by greater intensity and power, reflecting the protagonists' growth and development throughout the story.

The full-length version of the song had its first album appearance on the Shaman King album Osorezan Revoir: Prologue to Shaman, released on October 23, 2002. This album also included a previously unreleased ballad version of the song. Both versions were subsequently also included on Hayashibara's studio album Center Color released on January 7, 2004.

The single was made available for streaming on March 30, 2021, along with the entire Megumi Hayashibara discography.

== Commercial performance ==
The single debuted and peaked at number 3 on the Oricon charts, selling 44,660 copies on its first week. It charted for nine weeks, with cumulative reported sales totaling 93,080 copies. It remains Hayashibara's highest-charting single to date, and at the time of its release it also set the record for the highest charting position ever attained by a single from a voice actor in Oricon history, a benchmark it held until surpassed by Nana Mizuki's "Phantom Minds" in 2010.

The single was certified gold by the Recording Industry Association of Japan in October 2003. In August 2019, it received an additional gold certification by the RIAJ for digital downloads of the title track.

== Impact and legacy ==
Upon its release, "Northern Lights" amassed considerable popularity and went on to be considered one of the foundational tracks of 2000s anime songs. In 2016, the song was voted by 10,000 anime fans as the seventeenth best anime song of the 2000s by a female vocalist, via the anime analytics website Charapedia. The song is also a widely popular karaoke song in Japan, being ranked 17th on the Top 100 most performed tracks by voice actors in 2023 by Japanese karaoke provider DAM.

== Cover versions ==
Masami Okui recorded her own version of "Northern Lights" on her 2003 cover album Masami Kobushi. In 2020, voice actress unit Afterglow recorded a cover of the song for the game BanG Dream! Girls Band Party!; the track was subsequently included on the group's 2023 album Stay Glow.

On August 29, 2010, female vocalists Ayane and Faylan performed the song live at the Animelo Summer Live 2010 concert held at the Saitama Super Arena.

== Track listing ==
All lyrics are written by Megumi; all music is composed by Go Takahashi.

CD single/digital release track listing
No.	Title	Length
1.	"Northern Lights"	3:13
2.	"Omokage" (おもかげ, lit. 'Vestige')	4:12
3.	"Northern Lights" (off vocal version)	3:13
4.	"Omokage" (off vocal version)	4:11

== Personnel ==
Credits adapted from the liner notes of the CD single.

- Megumi Hayashibara - vocals, lyrics, chorus
- Go Takahashi - songwriting, arrangements, keyboards, chorus, recording producer
- Eiichi Ishikawa - drums
- Yoshiro Kanamori - bass
- Takahiro Shuto - guitar
- Fumio Nishiyama - guitar
- Yasuharu Nakanishi - piano
- Shigehiko Saito - synthesizer, manipulator
- Satoshi Iwase - synthesizer, manipulator
- Gen Ittetsu Strings - strings
- Keiji Kondo - mixing
- Shinpei Yamada - recording engineer
- Hiroyuki Tsuji - recording engineer
- Akira Ando - mastering engineer
- Toshimichi Otsuki - executive producer

== Charts ==
=== Weekly charts ===
Weekly chart performance for "Northern Lights"
Chart (2002)	Peak position
Japan (Oricon)	3

=== Year-end charts ===
Year-end chart performance for "Northern Lights"
Chart (2002)	Position
Japan (Oricon)	152

== Certifications ==
Region	Certification	Certified units/sales
Japan (RIAJ) Physical	Gold	100,000^{^}
Japan (RIAJ) Digital	Gold	100,000^{*}
^{*} Sales figures based on certification alone.^{^} Shipments figures based on certification alone.
