= New Moon (Northern Lights album) =

Studio album by Northern Lights
- Released: 2005
- Recorded: 2005
- Genre: Bluegrass, progressive bluegrass
- Label: Fifty Fifty Music
- Producer: Northern Lights

Northern Lights chronology
Another Sleepless Night (2001)	New Moon (2005)	One Day (2008)

New Moon is an album by the progressive bluegrass band Northern Lights. In 2003, three members of Northern Lights, Taylor Armerding, Dave Dick and Christ Miles, left the group, leaving Bill Henry to build a new band from the scratch. He recruited four new members, so that the band became a quintet again: Ben Demerath on guitar, Mike Barnett on violin, Joe Walsh on mandolin and John Daniel on bass. This is also the first album in group's history, which doesn't feature 5-string banjo but two acoustic guitars instead.

== Track listing ==
1. Oh, Lady Be Good (Gershwin) 3:04
2. Lonely Moon (Brayer) 3:03
3. Listen to the Radio (Griffith) 2:28
4. Empty Pages (Capaldi, Winwood) 3:50
5. Twenty Six Daughters (Demerath) 5:00
6. Bury Me Beneath the Willow (trad.) 2:59
7. Sit Down Servant (trad.) 2:40
8. Dusty Miller / Ride the Wild Turkey (trad., Anger) 4:27
9. Blue Chalk (Gorka) 4:12
10. California Blues (Rodgers) 3:18
11. Orphan Girl (Welch) 3:16
12. Baby I Love You (Roosevelt) 4:07

== Personnel ==
- Ben Demerath - guitar, vocals
- John Daniel - bass, vocals
- Bill Henry - vocals, guitar
- Joe Walsh - mandolin, vocals
- Mike Barnett - violin, vocals
