= One Day (Northern Lights album) =

Studio album by Northern Lights
- Released: 2008
- Recorded: 2008
- Genre: Bluegrass, progressive bluegrass
- Label: Fifty Fifty Music
- Producer: Northern Lights

Northern Lights chronology
New Moon (2005)	One Day (2008)

One Day is the final studio album by the progressive bluegrass band Northern Lights. 5-string banjo is back in the group sound, as Mike Kropp returns as a guest player for this album.

== Track listing ==
1. Short Time Going (Emery) 3:21
2. Fat Man in the Bathtub (George) 3:56
3. Miss Molly (Walker) 2:24
4. Moneghan's Jig (trad.) 4:09
5. Working on a Building (trad.) 4:01
6. Please Search your Heart (Goble, Lawson) 3:05
7. One Day (Daniel) 3:31
8. Sailing to Philadelphia (Knopfler) 3:55
9. Waiting in Vain (Marley) 4.42
10. Talk About Something (trad.) 3:50

== Personnel ==
- Ben Demerath - guitar, vocals
- John Daniel - bass, vocals
- Bill Henry - vocals, guitar
- Joe Walsh - mandolin, vocals
- Mike Barnett - violin, vocals

with

- Mike Kropp - banjo
