= Living in the City (album) =

Studio album by Northern Lights
- Released: 1996
- Recorded: 1996
- Genre: Bluegrass, progressive bluegrass
- Length: 44:07
- Label: Red House
- Producer: Northern Lights

Northern Lights chronology
Wrong Highway Blues (1994)	Living in the City (1996)	Three August Nights (2000)

For the similarly titled 1974 Stevie Wonder song, see "Living for the City"

Living in the City is an album by the progressive bluegrass band Northern Lights. After this album two members left the band, Jake Armerding and Jeff Horton, both to pursue their own music.

== Track listing ==
No.	Title	Writer(s)	Length
1.	"Got the Spirit"	Armerding	4:02
2.	"Home from the Mills"	Mellyn	3:20
3.	"She Don't Love Nobody"	Hiatt	3:11
4.	"Build It Up"	Emery	3:00
5.	"Special Delivery"	Kropp	3:02
6.	"Valley to Pray"	Guthrie, Watson	3:25
7.	"Sing to You"	Armerding	2:51
8.	"Little Jewels"	Parsons	4:10
9.	"Ariel's Hornpipe"	Armerding	3:35
10.	"Living in the City"	Armerding	3:56
11.	"Lonely Is"	Henry	4:59
12.	"Leave Here Tonight"	Henry	4:36

== Personnel ==
- Taylor Armerding - mandolin, guitar, vocals
- Jeff Horton - bass, vocals
- Bill Henry - vocals, guitar
- Mike Kropp - banjo, guitar
- Jake Armerding - violin, mandolin, vocals
