= Three August Nights =

Live album by Northern Lights
- Released: 2000
- Recorded: 2000
- Genre: Bluegrass, progressive bluegrass
- Label: Prime CD Records
- Producer: Northern Lights

Northern Lights chronology
Living in the City (1996)	Three August Nights (2000)	Another Sleepless Night (2001)

Professional ratings
Review scores
Source	Rating
Allmusic	3/5 stars

Three August Nights is a live album by the progressive bluegrass band Northern Lights. After the departure of Jake Armerding, the band plays as a quartet with guest fiddler Vassar Clements. This would be the last album for Taylor Armerding, the only founding member remaining in the group.

== Track listing ==
1. Goodbye Old Pal (Monroe) 2:37
2. Midnight Moonlight (P.Rowan) 7:43
3. John Hardy (trad.) 3:58
4. Hold Whatcha Got (J.Martin) 2:48
5. Dixie Breakdown (Lunceford, Reno) 3:03
6. Kinfolks in Carolina (Travis) 3:06
7. Rainmaker (Nicholson, P.Rowan) 5:46
8. Northern Rail (T.Armerding) 4:56
9. Wild Horses (Jagger, Richards) 4:31
10. Got the Spirit (T.Armerding) 4:07
11. Can't Buy Your Way (T.Armerding) 5:18
12. Heartache Tonight (Frey, Henley, Souther) 3:32
13. Dueling Banjos (Smith, Weissberg) 3:14
14. T For Texas (Rodgers) 5:01

== Personnel ==
- Taylor Armerding - mandolin, guitar, vocals
- Chris Miles - bass, vocals
- Bill Henry - vocals, guitar
- Mike Kropp - banjo, guitar

with Vassar Clements - violin
