= Before the Fire Comes Down =

Studio album by Northern Lights
- Released: 1983
- Recorded: 1983
- Genre: Bluegrass, progressive bluegrass
- Label: Revonah Records

Northern Lights chronology
Northern Lights (1976)	Before the Fire Comes Down (1983)	On the Edge (1986)

Before the Fire Comes Down is the second album by the progressive bluegrass band Northern Lights.

== Track listing ==
A-Side
No.	Title	Length
1.	"Before the Fire Comes Down"	3:38
2.	"Used To Be"	2:45
3.	"Back On My Mind"	3:37
4.	"Kudzu On The Move"	5:05
5.	"Portland"	4:18
6.	"Tossing And Turning"	2:02
Total length:		21:23

B-Side
No.	Title	Length
1.	"Amarillo"	3:10
2.	"Bye Bye Blues"	2:25
3.	"Build It Up"	2:41
4.	"Deep Ellam Blues"	2:20
5.	"Run Grunion, Run"	3:31
6.	"Cash On The Barrelhead"	2:47
Total length:		17:19

== Personnel ==
- Taylor Armerding – mandolin, vocals
- Bob Emery – bass, vocals
- Bill Henry – vocals, guitar
- Alison Brown – banjo
