= Wrong Highway Blues =

Studio album by Northern Lights
- Released: 1994
- Recorded: 1994
- Genre: Bluegrass, progressive bluegrass
- Length: 48:37
- Label: Flying Fish Records
- Producer: Northern Lights

Northern Lights chronology
Can't Buy Your Way (1992)	Wrong Highway Blues (1994)	Living in the City (1996)

Professional ratings
Review scores
Source	Rating
Allmusic	3/5 stars

Wrong Highway Blues is the sixth studio album by the progressive bluegrass band Northern Lights. The band plays as a quintet for the first time on this album as Jake Armerding, son of mandolinist Taylor Armerding, joins the band on violin and harmony vocals. He has played as a full member of the band since 1992, joining at the young age of 14, but started performing gigs with the Northern Lights at the age of 12.

== Track listing ==
1. Living Without You (Armerding) 4:19
2. Climb a Tall Mountain (Pennell) 3:26
3. Guns of November (Mellyn) 5:32
4. Sunny Side of Blue (Henry) 3:39
5. Fisherman's Lament (Henry) 3:46
6. Walking Away (Henry) 4:58
7. Wrong Highway Blues (Armerding) 4:01
8. Holding On (Henry) 4:05
9. Buss Stop (Kropp) 3:51
10. Give Me Back Tomorrow (Pennell) 3:35
11. Ray of Hope (Henry) 3:43
12. Soldier of the Cross (L.Rowan) 3:42

== Personnel ==
- Taylor Armerding - mandolin, guitar, vocals
- Jeff Horton - bass, vocals
- Bill Henry - vocals, guitar
- Mike Kropp - banjo, guitar
- Jake Armerding - violin, vocals
