= Charles Hirshberg =

American journalist and sportswriter

Charles Hirshberg is an American journalist and sportswriter. He primarily writes for large-circulation magazines. His articles and columns have appeared in Time, Sports Illustrated, Life, the Los Angeles Times, The Washington Post, Men's Health and other publications. As of 2002, he was an editor of Popular Science. His mother was the astrophysicist Joan Feynman and his uncle was Nobel Prize-winning physicist Richard Feynman.

== Bibliography ==
Hirshberg is the author of several books:

- Hirshberg, Charles; Berman, Chris (2004). ESPN : a salute to mind-bending, eye-popping, culture-morphing highlights. New York: ESPN Books. OCLC 1035891077.
- Hirshberg, Charles (2007). Elvis remembered : 30 years later. New York: Time Home Entertainment. ISBN 9781933821863. OCLC 819408398.
- Zwonitzer, Mark; Hirshberg, Charles (2014). Will You Miss Me When I'm Gone?: The Carter Family and Their Legacy in American Music. Riverside: Simon & Schuster. ISBN 9781439127445. OCLC 1085227911.
- Hirshberg, Charles; Jerome, Richard; Russell, Lisa (September 8, 2017). Glen Campbell : A Life in Song, 1936-2017. Time Inc. Books. ISBN 9781547840588. OCLC 1005826155.
