= Take You to the Sky =

Studio album by Northern Lights
- Released: 1990
- Recorded: 1990
- Genre: Bluegrass, progressive bluegrass
- Label: Flying Fish Records
- Producer: Bill VornDick, Northern Lights

Northern Lights chronology
On the Edge (1987)	Take You to the Sky (1990)	Can't Buy Your Way (1992)

Professional ratings
Review scores
Source	Rating
Allmusic	4.5/5 stars

Take You to the Sky is the fourth album by the progressive bluegrass band Northern Lights.

== Track listing ==
1. Northern Rail (Armerding) 4:42
2. Hold Whatcha Got (Martin) 2:57
3. The Roseville Fair (Staines) 3:29
4. Early Morning Riser (Henry) 3:40
5. Let It Roll (Barrere, Kibbee, Payne) 4:17
6. T for Texas (Rodgers) 3:17
7. Winterhawk (Armerding) 3:33
8. Home Brew Fever (Crawford) 2:40
9. April Snow (Kropp) 4:06
10. Souvenirs (Prine) 3:54
11. Back on My Mind Again (Ashforth) 3:14
12. Bourée/Borealis Blues (Bach, Henry) 7:02

== Personnel ==
- Taylor Armerding - mandolin, vocals
- Oz Barron - bass, vocals
- Bill Henry - vocals, guitar
- Mike Kropp - banjo, guitar

with

- Mat Glasser - violin
- Alison Krauss - violin
- Peter Rowan - vocals
- Bill Vorndick - drums
