= On the Edge (Northern Lights album) =

Studio album by Northern Lights
- Released: 1986
- Recorded: 1986
- Genre: Bluegrass, progressive bluegrass
- Label: Revonah Records

Northern Lights chronology
Before the Fire Comes Down (1983)	On the Edge (1986)	Take You to the Sky (1990)

On the Edge is the third album by the progressive bluegrass band Northern Lights.

== Track listing ==
All tracks written by Taylor Armerding unless otherwise noted

=== Side A ===
1. "On the Edge" - 2:45
2. "City on the Hill" - 3:08
3. "Red Sky" (Bob Emery) - 3:50
4. "Badminton Bounce/Hippodrome Reel" (Orin Star/Traditional) - 3:20
5. "Baltimore" - 4:00

=== Side B ===
1. "Short Time Going" (Bob Emery) - 2:40
2. "Streets of London" (Ralph McTell) - 3:50
3. "Soldier of the Cross" (Rowan Brothers) - 3:33
4. "Tell Me You Love Me" - 3:29
5. "Cold Storage" (Mike Kropp) - 4:05

== Personnel ==
- Taylor Armerding - mandolin, vocals
- Bob Emery - bass, vocals
- Bill Henry - vocals, guitar
- Mike Kropp - banjo, guitar
