= Northern Lights (Northern Lights album) =

Studio album by Northern Lights
- Released: 1976
- Recorded: 1976
- Genre: Bluegrass, progressive bluegrass
- Label: Revonah

Northern Lights chronology
Northern Lights (1976)	Before the Fire Comes Down (1983)

Northern Lights is the self-titled debut album by the progressive bluegrass band Northern Lights, recorded in 1976 under the Revonah Records label.

== Track listing ==
Side A
No.	Title	Length
1.	"Athens County"
2.	"Delta Tide"
3.	"Northern Comfort"
4.	"Wicked Path of Sin"
5.	"Salt Creek"
6.	"Boards Across the Window"

Side B
No.	Title	Length
1.	"Blue and Lonesome"
2.	"We Live in Two Different Worlds"
3.	"Sea Miner"
4.	"A Hard Day's Night"
5.	"Little Black Boy"
6.	"Ramblin' Man"

== Personnel ==
- Taylor Armerding - mandolin, vocals
- Bob Emery - guitar, vocals
- Dan Marcus - banjo, vocals
- Marty Sachs - bass, vocals
