= Shaman King (2001 TV series) =

2001 TV adaptation of Shaman King

- Cover of the first uncut North American DVD
- No. of episodes: 64

Original release
- Network: TV Tokyo
- Release: July 4, 2001 – September 25, 2002

Shaman King is an anime television series based on the manga of the same name written by Hiroyuki Takei & Weekly Shonen Jump Comics,Ltd.. The series is directed by Seiji Mizushima and co-produced by TV Tokyo, NAS, and Xebec. At an early stage of anime production, Takei himself helped the anime's staff. However, he soon left the staff due to his time limitations as he was working on the manga. In September 2020, Mizushima commented that the original anime material presented in the latter half of the show was not something he did on his own accord, and it was requested from Shaman King's original publisher Shueisha. The 64 episodes were aired between July 4, 2001, and September 25, 2002, on TV Tokyo in Japan. While originally faithful to the manga, eventually the anime deviated from the original storyline as the manga was still being serialized at the time. As a result, the later half of episodes are completely unrelated to the manga, with a separate definite conclusion created for the 2001 series. 4Kids Entertainment obtained the rights to broadcast the Shaman King anime in the United States, where it premiered on FoxBox on September 6, 2003.

The episodes were collected into 16 DVD compilations by King Records in Japan and released between October 30, 2001, and January 22, 2003. The DVDs were later collected and released in three box sets between August 27, 2008, and December 25, 2008. Two DVD compilations of the English adaptation have been released by Funimation between October 19, 2004, and March 29, 2005, in an uncut form. In June 2020, it was announced that the series would be streamed on Full Anime TV and Bonbon TV services in Japan.

From episodes 1–34, the opening theme is "Over Soul" by Megumi Hayashibara while the ending theme is "Trust You" by Hayashibara. From episodes 35–64, the opening theme is "Northern Lights" by Megumi Hayashibara while the ending themes are "Reminiscent" (おもかげ, Omokage) by Hayashibara and "Overlapping Souls" (魂魄重ねて, Konpaku Kasanete) by Yūko Satō. Several CDs that contain the theme music and other tracks have been released by King records.

== Episodes ==
No.	Original Japanese title / 4Kids English dub title	Directed by	Written by	Original release date	English air date
1	"A Boy Who Dances with Ghosts" / "Yoh, Morty!"; Transliteration: "Yūrei to Odoru Shōnen" (Japanese: 幽霊と踊る少年)	Seiji Mizushima	Katsuhiko Koide	July 4, 2001	September 6, 2003
Going back home after another day of school, thirteen-year-old student Manta Oyamada decides to take a shortcut through a cemetery. On the way, he is horrified to meet a boy surrounded by spirits. On the next day, Manta's friends don't believe his story. Moreover, the boy, introduced as Yoh Asakura, turns out to be their new colleague, but denies having met Manta, strengthening his friends' disbelief. Manta decides to photograph Yoh with the ghosts at the cemetery. However, vandal Ryu of the Wooden Sword and his gang have taken over the spot. Ryu destroys a grave belonging to legendary samurai Amidamaru against his friend's advice that it could curse them. Manta makes his presence accidentally known and gets beaten up. On the next day, Yoh finally admits ghosts are real and takes a bruised Manta to the cemetery to confront Ryu and his gang. By embodying the spirit of Amidamaru, who feels humiliated following his grave's vandalizing, Yoh easily defeats Ryu and two of his thugs, expelling the gang from the cemetery for good.
2	"Waiting Samurai" / "Guardian Ghost"; Transliteration: "Matsu Samurai" (Japanese: 待つサムライ)	Osamu Satō	Katsuhiko Koide	July 11, 2001	September 13, 2003
Yoh wants the spirit of Amidamaru to be his guardian spirit, but he refuses because he is waiting for someone and can't leave the cemetery. Yoh tries to find out who the samurai is waiting for and decides to visit a local museum where Amidamaru's sword, Harusame, is kept. They learn from the museum's janitor that legend has it that the sword cries every night and a haunting voice can be heard. Yoh and Manta investigate and find out that Mosuke, the sword's forger and Amidamaru's close friend, is the one who cries. He explains that the two boys grew up 600 years ago in a war-torn Japan. When they became adults, they were hired by a Daimyō. However, he eventually ordered Amidamaru to kill Mosuke so that no other Harusame could be forged. Instead, he told Mosuke to flee. Mosuke asked for Harusame and promised to return it as the best katana ever in the next night. However, someone overheard the conversation and the Daimyō sent several soldiers to kill Amidamaru, who slayed them all and became a legend for it. However, without his Harusame, he eventually died. Feeling guilty for Amidamaru's death and embarrassed for Harusame's ruined state, Mosuke now spends his death crying over the sword. With the help of Yoh, who embodies him, Mosuke is finally able to restore Harusame and leaves to the world of the dead. Yoh delivers the sword to Amidamaru, who also decides to leave the living world. However, Ryu returns to the cemetery seeking revenge. Amidamaru aborts his trip and helps Yoh defeat the vandal again. Afterwards, Amidamaru decides to stay and become Yoh's ally. Harusame is returned to the museum and its restoring is regarded as a miracle.
3	"Another Shaman" / "Lenny"; Transliteration: "Mō Hitori no Shāman" (Japanese: もう一人のシャーマン)	Tsuyoshi Nagasawa	Katsuhiko Koide	July 18, 2001	September 20, 2003
Manta finds out a sinister shaman, Tao Ren, is in town. Yoh eventually meets him and Ren mocks him for treating Amidamaru as a friend before challenging him to a fight. That night, at another cemetery, Ryu and his friends try to make it a new place to hang out, but Ren arrives and beats them all. Yoh intervenes just in time to save Ryu and the two fight. Yoh is too much for Ren, who decides to use 100% of his power. Unable to unleash his full power as well, Yoh is easily knocked out. During the fight, Ryu is able to see their guardian spirits as blurs.
4	"Hyoi 100%" / "Perfect Unity"; Transliteration: "Hyōi Hyaku" (Japanese: 憑依100)	Kazuki Kakuta	Katsuhiko Koide	July 25, 2001	September 27, 2003
Yoh is able to partially dodge Ren's attack, but ends up with a broken arm. Ryu's gang force Ren away and take Yoh to the hospital. While recovering, Yoh has memories of him as a child being taught early shaman skills by his grandfather. Later, Yoh confronts Ren again. Still unable to achieve 100%, he tells Amidamaru to flee before Ren makes him his guardian spirit. However, Amidamaru refuses to abandon Yoh. Their strong bond finally allows them to use their full power. As a result, Yoh defeats Ren, but succumbs to exhaustion and is taken back to the hospital. Meanwhile, a girl is shown wandering the streets.
5	"A Shaman Who is Mature for Her Age" / "A New Order"; Transliteration: "Oshama na Shāman" (Japanese: おシャマなシャーマン)	Tsuyoshi Nagasawa	Katsuhiko Koide	August 1, 2001	October 4, 2003
The girl seen in the end of the previous episode is revealed to be Yoh's cold and harsh fiancée, Kyōyama Anna. She decides to coach Yoh for the upcoming Shaman Fight, which happens every 500 years, scheduled to take place in Tokyo this time. Her methods seem abusive, but the training comes in handy when Yoh defeats three jiangshi sent by Ren's sister, Jun, who promises to take Yoh down.
6	"Kung Fu Master" / "The Kung-Fu Master"; Transliteration: "Kan Fū Masutā" (Japanese: カンフーマスター)	Shigeru Ueda	Akihiko Inari	August 8, 2001	October 11, 2003
Manta brings Yoh, Anna and Amidamaru to watch a movie about his idol, the late Kung-Fu fighter Lee Pai-Long who died mysteriously 17 years ago and had his body stolen in the middle of the funeral. As they leave the cinema, Jun confronts them personally with one of her jiangshi, which Yoh easily defeats again. Jun then reveals her main jiangshi: Lee Pai-Long himself. Jun explains he was killed to serve the Tao family and his corpse, re-embodied with his own spirit and fully controlled by her, was given to her as a birthday gift. Eventually, Yoh manages to reawaken Lee's emotions, but Jun still manages to control him. Yoh can't overpower Lee Pai-Long and Amidamaru blames their improvised sword. Jun threatens Manta, who abandons Yoh and leaves the spot.
7	"Pai-Long's Fists of Fury" / "Pai-Long Attacks!"; Transliteration: "Pairon Ikari no Ippatsu" (Japanese: パイロン怒りの一発)	Nobuyoshi Habara; Atsushi Ōtsuki	Akihiko Inari	August 15, 2001	October 18, 2003
It is revealed that Manta left the place to search for a better sword for Yoh to use. He eventually stumbles upon a gang of vandals whose leader carries a wooden sword. He asks them for the weapon, and they respond by beating him up. However, Ryu rescues Manta and takes him to Yoh, who borrows Ryu's sword and is now able to fight toe-to-toe with Pai-Long. Eventually freed from his enslavement, Pai-Long goes berserk and aimlessly attacks Jun and Yoh. To fight him, Anna summons the spirit of Pai-Long's late master, Shamon, who embodies Yoh and brings his pupil back to his senses. Pai-Long's spirit is removed from his corpse and freed to go by Jun, but he asks to be her jiangshi again, now willingly, which she accepts.
8	"Shaman Life" / "The Rio Deal"; Transliteration: "Shāman Raifu" (Japanese: シャーマンライフ)	Osamu Satō	Katsuhiko Koide	August 22, 2001	October 25, 2003
After witnessing Yoh's fight against Pai-Long, Ryu of the Wooden Sword decides that he wants to become a Shaman too. He asks Yoh to be his mentor, but Anna hires him as their housekeeper, instead. Meanwhile, Gei Yin, another shaman under the Tao family, arrives from China to have a go against Yoh. Jun refuses her help and tries to force her out of their apartment, but Gei's Yugai easily subdues Lee Pai-Long. Later, Gei faces off against Yoh in a park, but Yoh manages to destroy Yugai. In China, Ren's father is seen raising an army of jiangshi.
9	"The Boy from the North" / "Northern Boarder"; Transliteration: "Kita no Kuni kara kita Shōnen" (Japanese: 北の国から来た少年)	Takafumi Hoshikawa	Satoru Nishizono	August 29, 2001	November 1, 2003
Yoh and Manta find an Ainu traveler called HoroHoro passed out by a snowman (though it's summer) and take him home, where Anna allows him to stay provided he helps keeping the house. Later, HoroHoro reveals he can also see spirits and that he's come to Tokyo to fulfill his dream of creating a vast field of petasites where the koro-pok-guru, spirits of his people's folklore, could live. He used to sell Ainu handicraft for a living, but he had all his pieces stolen. Anna worries that he might be a shaman trying to eliminate opponents before the start of the Shaman Fight. When they attempt to investigate, HoroHoro goes missing. They find him outside fighting a group of jiangshi with his koro-pok-guru guardian spirit, Kororo, embodied in his snowboard. Yoh joins the fight and HoroHoro finishes them off. Later, he explains he suspected they had stolen his things and tracked them to Yoh's house, where he watched them from afar until he passed out due to hunger. However, Anna explains they were simply sent by the Tao family to kill Yoh. HoroHoro later finds his belongings at a police station where he learns they were confiscated so they would not block the sidewalk. Still having nowhere to go, he returns to Yoh's house.
10	"Fate of 600 Years" / "The Infamous Tokageroh"; Transliteration: "Innen Rokupyaku-nen" (Japanese: 因縁600年)	Kazuki Kakuta	Satoru Nishizono	September 5, 2001	November 8, 2003
Ryu believes he'll never be able to become a Shaman and doesn't go to Yoh's place for his duties. In order to cheer him up, Muscle Punch, one of his friends, takes the gang to an abandoned bowling place, where they intend to establish their "best place", a place where they can hang out. Ryu rejects the place, however, for being too far from a train station and lacking a convenience store. Still, they decide to have a go at bowling. When Yoh and Manta come check the place looking for him, he hides in the female restroom, where he is possessed by the spirit of Tokageroh (Gecko). Meanwhile, Yoh, Manta and Amidamaru sense the place is haunted and advise everyone to leave it once they find Ryu. Big Ball, another friend of Ryu, says no business in that area succeeds due to a curse. Ryu emerges from the restroom as a ruthless bandit and takes his gang to the museum where Harusame is kept, intending to steal it. Manta spies on them and ends up kidnapped. Ryu takes him and his reluctant gang to Yoh's house, where Tokageroh reveals himself and says he wants revenge on Amidamaru for killing him 600 years ago.
11	"Rain That Falls In Spring" / "Vendetta"; Transliteration: "Haru ni Furu Ame" (Japanese: 春にふる雨)	Tsuyoshi Nagasawa	Satoru Nishizono	September 12, 2001	November 15, 2003
Threatening Manta, Tokageroh forces Yoh into a fight in which he eventually unveils Amidamaru's own Harusame, much to everyone's surprise. Anna soon realizes the only way of saving Manta is by incapacitating Ryu' body, which could kill him, or by destroying the sword. Amidamaru has a memory of his poor and troubled childhood as a member of a group of orphans who lived by themselves. After seeing many of his low-quality katanas destroyed in battle by Amidamaru, Mosuke decided to make a fine sword using his late father's blade. Amidamaru cries with such gesture and says it is raining in spite of the spring season, which is the origin of the sword's name (spring rain). Back to the present, Tokageroh tries to kill Manta, but Ryu's friends rescue the boy, hold Ryu still and try to make him come back to his senses, to no avail. Having lost his hostage, Tokageroh now uses Ryu himself as a hostage. Inspired by Ryu's gang, Amidamaru and Yoh realize Harusame is not as important as Ryu and destroy it. Tokageroh still attempts a final move, but Ryu's unprepared body succumbs to the exhaustion of being embodied. Sensing all Tokageroh ever wanted was some friends, Yoh lends him his own body for him to do what he pleases. Everyone is shocked to see that Tokageroh will attempt to kil Yoh, but he gives up and cries when he realizes someone is willing to die for him.
12	"The Star that Signals the Beginning" / "A New Shaman"; Transliteration: "Hajimari wo Tsugeru Hoshi" (Japanese: 始まりを告げる星)	Naoyoshi Kusaka	Katsuhiko Koide	September 19, 2001	November 22, 2003
After breaking Amidamaru's sword, Ryu becomes even more depressed out of guilty. Everyone is surprised when he announces he's able to perfectly see Amidamaru, and Anna explains his shaman powers were awakened following Tokageroh's possession. Ryu's gang look for a way of cheering Ryu up while he works hard at the house to pay for Tokageroh's wrongs. Meanwhile, the spirits that live in the house are gone and Anna, Yoh and HoroHoro sense a strong presence. A man wearing a bird mask is shown in a tree close to the house. The group decide to use Anna's powers to bring Mosuke back to the living world and embodies it on Ryu so they can restore the sword once again. Soon afterwards, the bird-masked man generates three warriors to challenge Yoh, who gets the chance to use his new weapon: the spiritual Harusame, forged by Mosuke and generated by the spiritual force of Yoh. With the new sword, Yoh easily defeats the three warriors. Anna explains they were shikigamis sent by Asakura Mikihisa, Yoh's father. Ryu and his gang leave with the former willing to follow his own path temporarily. As he rides away on his bike, Ragou, the star that signals the beginning of the Shaman Fight, descends from the sky and Mikihisa offers to be his coach.
13	"Over Soul" / "The Destiny Star"; Transliteration: "Ōbā Sōru" (Japanese: オーバーソウル)	Shigeru Ueda	Katsuhiko Koide	September 26, 2001	November 29, 2003
An Apache-like female elder figure is seen in a cave instructing ten similar male figures about the upcoming Shaman fight. Later, Yoh is invited by one of these mysterious figures for a test to be allowed in the Shaman Fight. Later at a park, the man introduces himself as Silva, hailing from the Patch tribe and one of the ten Shaman Fight priests. He explains that the only thing Yoh needs to do in order to enter the championship is to hit him once within 10 minutes. This task proves to be a real challenge for Yoh, since Silva has five different animal spirits with him and uses a different technique to unleash their powers. Soon, Yoh realizes Silva has his spirits embodied in objects all over his body and decides to give it a try by embodying Amidamaru in Harusame, giving birth to his very own Over Soul, with which he manages to hit Silva. Exhausted, Yoh learns that keeping an Over Soul consumes furyoku, the energy by which a Shaman's power is measured, which explains why he feels so tired. Yoh is given the oracle, an electronic device used as a bracelet where all information regarding the championship is uploaded. Soon after Silva leaves, Yoh is informed of his first opponent: HoroHoro.
14	"Shaman Fight" / "The Shaman Fight"; Transliteration: "Shāman Faito" (Japanese: シャーマンファイト)	Tamaki Nakatsu	Satoru Nishizono	October 3, 2001	December 6, 2003
HoroHoro's sister, Pirika Usui, pays him a visit at Yoh's house. When she finds out her brother is living with his first Shaman Fight opponent, she takes him off the place to stay with her at a camp nearby. Now alone with Yoh and Manta, Anna intensifies her fiancée's training. Two weeks later, Yoh, HoroHoro and their companions meet by a skyscraper where the battle is going to happen. The fight, overseen by Silva and Kalim (the priest who tested HoroHoro), will only end when one of them becomes unable to Over Soul. HoroHoro is surprised by Yoh's ability, but Pirika reminds him of his dream of saving the koro-pok-guru, which gives him strength to prepare his special attack, the All-Swallowing Avalanche. After the final clash, HoroHoro seems to be the winner, but Yoh emerges from under the snow safe and well, while HoroHoro's Over Soul ends, which makes him lose the match. Later, Anna and Manta comfort Pirika by explaining HoroHoro still have two battles. Meanwhile, Yoh and HoroHoro amicably have a bath together and promise to have a rematch.
15	"Bone Killers" / "Faust VIII"; Transliteration: "Bōn Kirāzu" (Japanese: ボーン・キラーズ)	Kazuki Kakuta	Akihiko Inari	October 10, 2001	February 14, 2004
HoroHoro skips his training to pay Yoh a visit, but Pirika captures him and goes bitter on Yoh for defeating her brother and "messing their dream". Yoh melancholically realizes only one person will be Shaman King. His second opponent is an eerie figure called Faust VIII and the fight is arranged at a catholic cemetery. Meanwhile, Silva takes Anna to dinner and asks her to make Yoh forfeit the match, explaining that Faust killed his previous opponent by continuously attacking him even after he was unable to Over Soul and despite a priest's intervention. Back at the cemetery, Faust reveals his medium - a full skeleton under his coat with a bullet hole on its forehead. He explains he is a necromancer and a descendant of Faust and that he was a doctor who found great pleasure in saving people's lives, but was unable to beat death, which motivated him to go after the Shaman King title. Manta comments that reviving the dead might be impossible, which infuriates Faust. The doctor takes control of the countless skeletons buried around him and have them kidnapp Manta and subdue Yoh. Manta is attached to a cross and Faust uses his powers to explore inside Manta's body while Manta is awake. Yoh breaks free from the bones and promises to take Faust down.
16	"Faust Love" / "The Rain of Bones"; Transliteration: "Fausuto Rabu" (Japanese: ファウスト・ラブ)	Osamu Satō	Akihiko Inari	October 17, 2001	February 21, 2004
Faust's skeletons can easily rebuild themselves, which causes Yoh to waste his furyoku with endless waves of enemies while the doctor continues to harass Manta. When the match officially begins, Yoh's already too tired. Faust eventually explains he wants to be Shaman King specifically to resurrect his late wife Eliza – the one whose skeleton he carries under his coat. They first met as kids, when Eliza had an incurable disease. After 20 years of researching, Faust found a cure and they married, opening a small medical center later. However, she was murdered by a criminal one night. Frustrated with his inability to bring her back to life, Faust explored his ancestor's writings and found out about the Shaman Fight. Silva, already overseeing the match, wonders why the calm Yoh is so angry and Anna explains Manta is Yoh's first non-shaman friend, and that he has always been rejected in his town due to his family's tradition as shamans, an activity associated with the devil nowadays. Back to the fight, Faust lets go of his skeletons and concentrates all his furyoku on Eliza's skeleton, eventually materializing her. She proves to be way above Yoh's league, specially because of his low furyoku. Silva explains Faust did not use more than 1% of his furyoku to control all those skeletons, and that kidnapping Manta and using the bones to distract Yoh was all a plan to weaken his opponent, who is actually stronger than him. Yoh eventually calls Eliza a doll, which infuriates Faust. The doctor unleashes the full power of Eliza on Yoh and later assembles every bone around to create a gigantic skeleton to crush Yoh. Tao Ren emerges and takes Faust out with just one hit, explaining he doesn't want anybody to kill Yoh because he is his next opponent.
17	"Two People's Journey to the Best Place" / "Road Trip"; Transliteration: "Besuto Pureisu Futari Tabi" (Japanese: ベストプレイス二人旅)	Shigeru Ueda	Satoru Nishizono	October 24, 2001	February 28, 2004
Due to Ren's interference, Yoh loses his match. In an attempt to prevent Manta from getting harmed again, Yoh ends their friendship. Later, Manta and Ryu accidentally meet by Yoh's house and read a note informing they left home for some time. Ryu invites Manta for a journey on his bike to search for Yoh and they head to Izumo, Yoh's hometown. A car is seen following them. Later, at a convenience store, Ryu secretly confronts the occupants of the car that's been following them and learns they are two shamans, a little girl and a woman, who attack him on sight. Tokageroh joins Ryu and they have a very brief fight with them, but Mikihisa intervenes and ends it. Yoh's father congratulates Ryu and advises him to fix a ripped sleeve, which reveals an oracle under it. In Izumo, Yoh meets Yohmei, his grandfather, and asks him for a way to get stronger in time for his fight with Ren. Yohmei tells him there is a way, but it may cost his life. Later, he takes him to the entrance of a dark cave. Yoh's training simply consists of following the cave's only path to the other side of it. On his way, he will be deprived of light and sound. Yoh understands and starts his journey, which is expected to last for seven days. Meanwhile, a pink-haired girl accompanied by the spirits of a fox and a raccoon predicts disaster will be brought on Yoh by two persons, "one small and one big".
18	"Yoh" / "The Tunnel of Tartarus"; Transliteration: "Yō" (Japanese: よう)	Atsushi Ōtsuki	Satoru Nishizono	October 31, 2001	March 6, 2004
Tamao, Ponchi and Konchi (the girl and the spirits seen at the end of the previous episode) decide to confront the "big and small". Ryu and Manta finally make it to Izumo and head to a local temple to ask for directions to Asakura's estate. However, Tamao, believing them to be the threats to Yoh, confronts them, but Anna intervenes and clears up the misunderstanding. Manta meets Yohmei, who explains Yoh's training and its risks. Meanwhile, Ryu, who was left at the temple, is greeted by Mikihisa, who takes him to the cave. Ryu gives it a try, but gives in within minutes. Tamao predicts the moment when Yoh is going to exit the cave and heads to the location with Manta, Anna, Yohmei and Amidamaru. The two girls who fought Ryu in the previous episode, now introduced as Elly and Milly, also reach the location and try to block the cave's entrance. However, Yoh still manages to emerge from it alive. Using his new Over Soul, in which Amidamaru is able to communicate with him, Yoh easily dispatches the girls. Meanwhile, HoroHoro is seen defeating an unknown rival in his third Shaman Fight match, which qualifies him for the next stage.
19	"The 2 Big Souls" / "Yoh vs. Lenny"; Transliteration: "Futari no Biggu Sōru" (Japanese: 2人のビッグソウル)	Naoyoshi Kusaka	Katsuhiko Koide	November 7, 2001	March 13, 2004
Silva and Kalim discuss Yoh and Ren's upcoming battle. Meanwhile, Tamao pays Yoh and Anna a visit to support the former. When the battle starts, the boys seem to be even. However, Ren unleashes his full furyoku, which makes his Over Soul evolve and become much bigger and stronger than Yoh's. With the help of Amidamaru, experienced in facing bigger rivals as a kid, Yoh eventually manages to dodge Bason's attacks. Having memories of his dark childhood and angry at Yoh's tranquility, Ren intensifies his attacks. Meanwhile, Jun is seen trying to convince her father, Tao En, to free Ren from the Tao family's commitments.
20	"Soul Mata Cemetery" / "One, Two, Three, Draw"; Transliteration: "Sōru Mata Reien" (Japanese: ソウル摩多霊園)	Naoyoshi Kusaka	Katsuhiko Koide	November 14, 2001	March 20, 2004
Jun tells her father that Ren is a gentle boy and has seen too many horrible things as Tao's heir. She also says Yoh's kind and warm heart will eventually make Ren lose despite their power difference. En rejects her words and has her imprisoned. Meanwhile, Yoh learns how to unleash the full power of his Over Soul, making it as big and strong as Ren's and securing himself a draw which qualifies both to the next stage. Later, everyone including Ren celebrate at Yoh's house. Realizing his ways were wrong, Ren decides to confront his father, the source of all his hatred, in China. It all goes downhill, though, and Bason heads back to Japan to ask Yoh for help.
21	"Believe" / "A Call to Adventure"; Transliteration: "Birību" (Japanese: ビリーブ)	Tamaki Nakatsu	Shō Aikawa	November 21, 2001	March 27, 2004
Bason explains how Ren took a beating from a mind-controlled Lee Pai-Long and was subsequently imprisoned by En. He only escaped because Ren ordered him to do so before En could turn him into another of his puppets. Anna disallows them to go help Ren stating that the Tao family is too dangerous. Meanwhile, Ryu is seen defeating an opponent in a Shaman Fight overseen by Yoh's father and one of the Ten priests. A group of spirits at the cemetery where Yoh first met Amidamaru are seen being attracted to a pair of heavy metal musicians. That night, Yoh, Manta, and HoroHoro sneak away from Yoh's house to rescue Ren. On their way, they cut through the cemetery and meet the heavy metal duo, who are introduced as BoZ brothers and state they have cleansed the cemetery from spirits. Tamao arrives with her spirits, who laugh at the duo's attire. They start to play a song that contains a Buddhist pray in its lyrics, which sends Ponchi, Konchi, Amidamaru and Bason to paradise. They also imprison Kororo, which cannot be sent to paradise for being a natural spirit. Meanwhile, they use a small army of little spirits to hold HoroHoro and Yoh and mention a certain person named Hao. Ryu emerges and defeats the duo, saving Yoh's group and finally revealing himself as a capable shaman bonded with Tokageroh. The battle is overseen by a female trio, who report the outcome to a boy sitting next to a large, red, humanoid creature. After the fight, Anna has all spirits from the cemetery plus Amidamaru, Bason, Ponchi and Konchi return to the living world. In their prison cell, Ren tells Jun he will confront his father again.
22	"Our Deadly Blows" / "The Dynasty Challenged"; Transliteration: "Oretachi no Hissatsu Waza" (Japanese: オレたちの必殺技)	Tsuyoshi Nagasawa	Shō Aikawa	November 28, 2001	April 3, 2004
En's wife asks him about his next steps now that their children are being punished. Meanwhile, Yoh, Manta, HoroHoro, Ryu and Bason reach the Tao family's main house. On their way to rescue Ren and Jun, they are stopped by the five jiangshi who are known as the Five Deities - five powerful warriors with altered bodies. Ryu is easily knocked out by one of them, but HoroHoro reveals his new Over Soul and holds his own against them. Ryu awakes safe and well and also reveals his new Over Soul, allowing Yoh and Manta to proceed to the dungeon where Ren and Jun are being kept. Later, they are seen defeating four of the dolls and are about to confront the fifth one. Yoh rescues Ren, who feels ready to take on his father again. However, Pai-Long emerges controlled by En and attacks the group in his evolved, dragon-like form. Since he is too important to Jun, Yoh and Ren figure a way of defeating him without destroying his corpse. The boys head back to Ryu and HoroHoro, only to find them defeated by the last jiangshi.
23	"Awakened Nyan Nyan Doushi" / "The Dynasty Fight"; Transliteration: "Yomigaeru Nyan Nyan Dōshi" (Japanese: 蘇る娘娘道士)	Osamu Satō	Katsuhiko Koide	December 5, 2001	April 10, 2004
Yoh and Ren are no match for the most powerful of the Five Deities. HoroHoro and Ryu wake up but even the four combined are still incapable of beating the jiangshi, who uses Pai Long's movements in combat. Manta deduces he is Shamon and the jiangshi confirms it. When he tries to finish Yoh off, Pai Long stops him and confronts his master's corpse, defeating it with just one hit. Afterwards, Ren and Jun go face their father and try to prevent Yoh and his friends from going with them, but they insist. En sends an army of jiangshi to fight them, but the dolls are easily defeated by the quintet. En keeps sending more dolls until he calls them off and has Ren come face him once and for all. Yoh and the others are struck with awe by En's size. HoroHoro and Ryu attack him, but En simply vanishes and reappears behind them, leaving his opponents mystified with his abilities.
24	"The Invincible Tao En" / "A New Dynasty"; Transliteration: "Fujimi no Tao En" (Japanese: 不死身の道円)	Kazuki Kakuta	Katsuhiko Koide	December 12, 2001	April 17, 2004
Yoh, Ren and the others try to figure out how En manages to prolong members of his body, teleport from one point to another within the room and regenerate himself. However, they end up easily overcome. Eventually, they deduce En's current form is just an Over Soul and decide to keep attacking him to exhaust his furyoku. Once he is weak enough, Ren applies a final hit to finally destroy his Over Soul, revealing En's true form: one of a normal-sized man. En explains how the Tao clan has served China's emperors until new war technologies were introduced and their shamanic powers were deemed evil and they were expelled from Beijing. Such betrayal is the reason behind his hatred. He also shows them his guardian spirits are the souls of all his ancestors. En attempts one final attack on Ren, but his son's confidence of mind proves able to defeat him. Exhausted, he still tries to fight, but his wife and father emerge and tell him to stop. Later, everyone has dinner together and Ren's grandfather reverberates En's speech about China's betrayal, but says Ren and Jun have broken free of Tao's duties. Meanwhile, En's spirits comfort him and say a new era is dawning for the Tao family. On the next day, the group heads back to Japan. En catches up with Ren, who is traveling alone, and gives him the Houraiken, the clan's sword.
25	"A Shaman's Journey" / "Shaman Journey"; Transliteration: "Shāman no Tabi e" (Japanese: シャーマンの旅へ)	Naoyoshi Kusaka	Katsuhiko Koide	December 19, 2001	April 24, 2004
Phase two of the Shaman Fight is announced and it will take place in the United States. The only information provided for the shamans is that they must reach the Patch village within three months. Yoh hangs out with Anna and then with Manta; HoroHoro enjoys some time with Pirika, who gives him an Ikupasu she crafted herself; Ryu reads a farewell collective gift handwritten by his gang; and Ren talks to Bason about the upcoming fights. Meanwhile, Silva is warned by Kalim that Hao – the person mentioned by Zenryou in episode 21 – is in town. He meets him, who is revealed to be the boy seen later in that episode. Silva says he is very bold to "show up again" and Hao explains he "exists since too long" and that it is because of him that Silva was born. Meanwhile, they notice a group of white-dressed figures watching them from afar. On the next day, Yoh, HoroHoro and Ryu head to an airport where Ren awaits them with a jet. Manta meets them there to say goodbye. Hao shows up and provokes them, easily defeating the four with his spirit, the gigantic Spirit of Fire. He tells Yoh to get stronger for him, the "future king Hao", and leaves carrying a group of partners.
26	"Big America" / "The Second Round Begins"; Transliteration: "Biggu Amerika" (Japanese: ビッグ・アメリカ)	Atsushi Ōtsuki	Katsuhiko Koide; Satoru Nishizono	December 26, 2001	September 18, 2004
The quartet's airplane crashes in the desert, but they safely land using their Over Souls. They deduce the jet's engine was attacked by a shaman. Meanwhile, a group of five female shamans, including Elly and Milly, are revealed to be the ones behind the attack. Amidamaru spots a city far in the distance and tells them it will take one day of walk to reach it. Eventually, the group meets SUV driver Billy, who gives them a ride to the town. There, they ask for directions to the Patch Village, but nobody knows a thing. One of the five ladies lures them to an ambush where they introduce themselves (besides Elly and Milly, the group is also formed by Sally, Lilly, and Sharona) and admit to being the ones behind the jet's sabotage, explaining the rules say nothing about eliminating adversaries prior to the official matches. However, Silva emerges and says if a fight is overseen by one of the Ten Priests, the losers may be disqualified. Yoh's group easily avoid the ladies' attacks and respond with a combined attack that intentionally misses them so they are scared, but unharmed. Realizing their power difference, the ladies flee, preventing a disqualification. Later, Ren appoints Yoh as the group leader and they get a ride from Billy once again.
27	"Dowsing Evolution" / "The Dowser"; Transliteration: "Daujingu Eboryūshon" (Japanese: ダウジング・エボリューション)	Tsuyoshi Nagasawa	Akihiko Inari	January 9, 2002	September 25, 2004
A green-haired boy is seen attacking three shamans with his dowsing pendulum. After the third attack, he says to himself he needs to find strong allies "in order to defeat Hao". Later, the five ladies, who have observed him before, ask him to join them, but he easily defeats them and says he has no interest in shamans weaker than himself. Before leaving, Milly tells him about Yoh's group, who are still looking for information leading to the Patch Village. The boy eventually finds Ryu and introduces himself as Lyserg Diethel, a shaman from the United Kingdom looking for strong allies before he proceeds to the next stage of the Shaman Fight with his guardian spirit, the small fairy Morphine. Initially mistaking him for a girl, Ryu takes Lyserg to the others, but Ren and HoroHoro are against admitting a complete stranger in the team. Lyserg forces them into a fight to test them and has memories of Hao standing inside his burning house by his parents' bodies eight years before. Stating he needs strong allies to defeat "him", Lyserg easily takes Ren and HoroHoro out, destroying their weapons in the process. Yoh ignores him and helps them walk to the hospital, but Lyserg insists on carrying on with the fight. Yoh easily destroys his glass pendulum, but he replaces it with a stronger one made of crystal and heads for his special attack. Yoh asks him who is he really fighting and Lyserg notices Yoh's look is identical to Hao's. Lyserg is defeated and frustrated, but Yoh nevertheless invites him to accompany them to the hospital so he can explain the reason behind his seek for allies.
28	"Lyserg the Revenger" / "Lost Boy Found"; Transliteration: "Rizerugu Ribenjā" (Japanese: リゼルグ・リベンジャー)	Shigeru Ueda	Shō Aikawa	January 16, 2002	October 2, 2004
The three shamans attacked by Lyserg in the beginning of the previous episode decide to join forces to get revenge on him. They are approached by Zenryou, who give them a small cage as a gift from "someone" to help them fight Lyserg. Meanwhile, Lyserg tells Yoh, Ryu, Ren and HoroHoro his story. Morphine was given to him as a kid, but she was locked inside a cage - the one in possession of BoZ Brothers- and he was tasked by his father, a Sherlock Holmes-like detective, with finding the key. As he was finally locating the key - which he uses as his crystal pendulum - inside the Big Ben, Hao visited his parents and asked them to join him for the upcoming Shaman Fight. They refused and Lyserg's father tried to arrest Hao for his alleged killings, but he responded by killing them and burning the house. When Lyserg arrived, he threw Morphine's cage on Hao, but Spirit of Fire caught it and they left. Despite the tragedy, Ren is still reluctant about accepting him as a member. Later, Milly tells him a trio of shamans are coming for him. Lyserg sneaks away from Yoh's group to face them alone, but Morphine ends up trapped within her cage. Ren rescues Lyserg with Bason incorporated in his body following his spear's destruction and says he will help because the "leader" has decided he is a new member of the group. HoroHoro joins the fight and reminds him that he had a partner all the time: Morphine. Ryu and Yoh arrive and Lyserg has the chance to recover his spirit. The trio ends up defeated and is later burned by Hao, who wonders if Yoh got stronger. Using his dowsing abilities, Lyserg deduces they should head to Southwestern United States.
29	"Super Guts" / "The Nature of Nature"; Transliteration: "Mera Konjō" (Japanese: メラ根性)	Naoyoshi Kusaka	Shō Aikawa	January 23, 2002	October 9, 2004
While walking across a frozen canyon filled with shamans amidst a heavy blizzard storm, Yoh and the others find the five ladies from episode 26 frozen and take shelter in a cave with them. Eventually, Lyserg's pendulum senses Hao's presence and they find him by the cave entrance inside some kind of invisible shield that prevents the blizzard from touching him and his followers, which impresses them all. Hao once again tells Yoh to get stronger and leaves. Sharona, Elly, and Sally join Hao's group, while Milly and Lilly stay behind. Lyserg is feeling down after witnessing Hao's nature-controlling power, but HoroHoro says no one can simply control the environment. Trying to cheer Lyserg up, Ryu tells him how he became a Shaman: after much insistence from Mikihisa, Yohmei agreed to train Ryu as long as he ascended to the top of Mount Sentsuuzan and came back alive, but he warned him of Yamata no Orochi, saying the spirit takes the form of the river and creates devastating floods. On his journey, overseen by Mikihisa, Ryu eventually came across an army of spirits sided with Orochi. Unable to feel connected to Ryu, Tokageroh left him to fight them alone. Later, a flood came towards Ryu. Tokageroh reunited with him and Ryu managed to hold the wave with his Over Soul. Back to the present, the group leaves the cave as the blizzard ceases. With her Over Soul, Lilly sees Hao tossing her three friends on the frozen river and using his spirit to create a gigantic wave to erase all shamans left behind. Using his special attack, Ryu manages to hold the wave and the group join forces to put an end to it and save the shamans caught by it, including the ladies. Meanwhile, Yohmei glances at a book called "Chou Senji Ryakketsu" and says it is "wishing Hao". He sends a Shinigami to Anna to deliver a message.
30	"The Stolen Oracle Bell" / "Oracle Bell Down"; Transliteration: "Ubawareta Orakuru Beru" (Japanese: うばわれたオラクルベル)	Tamaki Nakatsu	Akihiko Inari	January 30, 2002	October 16, 2004
Yoh and the others walk through a forest. Nearby, Milly has an argument with her friends and runs into the woods, where she is eventually attacked by Krysler, a shaman using the spirit of a spider. Stating he failed the initial Shaman Fight test, he steals her oracle bell, believing he will be granted a place in the Shaman Fight in the process. Yoh's group eventually find her and decide to help her retrieving her oracle bell. Meanwhile, Hao watches from afar and is in turn watched from afar by Mikihisa, who sends a message. The group locates Krystal, but he enters a bus. Using his Over Soul, Ryu manages to get them a lift from Billy in the middle of the woods. They finally catch Krystal, but the oracle bell is destroyed in the fight. Krystal takes Milly hostage in one final attempt of obtaining an oracle, but the girl's friends rescue her. Soon after, Silva comes flying and gives Milly a new oracle bell, explaining the oracle will only work for the person it was granted and it can be replaced if damaged. In Japan, Anna asks Manta to take her to Osorezan, where they are greeted by dozens of itakos. meanwhile, Mikihisa's message has been delivered to Yohmei and Kino accompanying him.
31	"Forest of Spirits" / "Ghost Town"; Transliteration: "Seirei no Mori" (Japanese: 精霊の森)	Takafumi Hoshikawa	Katsuhiko Koide	February 6, 2002	October 23, 2004
While attempting to have Billy come to give them another ride, Ryu and his friends are watched by a couple of small lightball-like spirits. They head to an abandoned town and join several other spirits who restore the city. Later, an elder couple gives them a ride and propose they stay overnight. The couple is revealed to be dolls controlled by the spirits, who spend the night secretly messing with Yoh's group. Meanwhile, Hao contemplates interfering in Yoh's "play", while Mikihisa watches from afar. In the morning after, the couple admits they realized Yoh and the others were shamans and asks them to investigate some "monsters" inhabiting the town's mines who occasionally come down to harm citizens. Joined by the five ladies, the group heads to the mine, where they reveal to the girls that there are no evil monsters and the couple is not real and that everything is just a made-up story by spirits who are possibly just looking for some fun. The monsters finally show up and engage in a friendly fight. Soon after, Hao materializes and burns some of the spirits, warning Yoh to stop playing and get stronger so he can "end the cycle". Hao then heads to a forest and demands Mikihisa to reveal himself, to no avail. He then asks him to deliver "that" to Yoh as soon as possible, so Yoh can reach the "strength of a thousand years ago". Following another encounter with the much more powerful Hao, Lyserg is frustrated again. In Japan, Anna performs a ritual that recovers a large pearl necklace called 1080 from the bottom of a lake.
32	"Horohoro's Taste of a Bitter Friendship" / "A Very Trey Day"; Transliteration: "Horohoro Nigai Tomo no Aji" (Japanese: ホロホロ苦い友の味)	Naoyoshi Kusaka	Katsuhiko Chiba	February 13, 2002	October 30, 2004
Following another failed attempt to summon Billy, Ryu and the others are starving. Concerned with it, HoroHoro checks a nearby forest for food. He eventually meets a shaman called Allen, who is not taking part of the Shaman Fight and spends his days protecting the local animals and trees. When some trucks and bulldozers come deforest the place for a future resort, Allan destroys the machines, but HoroHoro eventually stops him and says violence is not the right response. When the vehicles return for a second time, Allan's attempts to stop them cause a huge wildfire. They try to put the fire out, to no avail. HoroHoro suggests they destroy a part of the forest to stop the fire from spreading, but Allan is reluctant. HoroHoro then incorporates Kororo in the Ikupasu Pirika gave him, developing a new Over Soul with the power to destroy some trees and put the fire out simultaneously. Later, he returns to his friends with a large piece of meat, but asks them to "return nature's gift". The group cleans the forest fire site and plants several new trees. Allan finally understands it is OK for humans to be part of the cycle of nature. Meanwhile, one of Hao' followers talks to him about Yoh. In Japan, Anna takes part of a purification ritual and asks Yohmei about the next step, which, according to him, "already began 13 years ago".
33	"The Mysterious Asakura" / "Zeke Attack"; Transliteration: "Himitsu na Asakura" (Japanese: ひみつな麻倉)	Nobuyoshi Habara	Katsuhiko Koide	February 20, 2002	November 6, 2004
Hao orders Ashil, the follower seen talking to him in the previous episode, to kill "one or two" of Yoh's friends so he becomes wiser and angrier. Bill Burton is sent along to keep Yoh himself from taking part of the fight and getting harmed. As the pair leaves, Opacho, another of Hao's followers, remarks "their" presence. Even alone, Ashil fights Ryu, Horohoro, Ren and Lyserg with ease. He also reveals that Yoh is Hao's descendant, shocking everyone. After Yoh manages to break through Burton's defense and join the battle, Ashil decides to have him and his friends terminated, but he is suddenly killed by a beam of light. Some white-dressed shamans - the ones seen in episode 25 - emerge next to a gigantic, robotic, angel-like creature and a blond man introduces them as the X-Laws, a sect devoted to erasing Hao and his followers from Earth. They even invite Yoh's group to join them, but Yoh refuses due to Ashil's cold-blooded execution. Later, Opacho asks Hao about the X-Laws and Hao replies he will allow them to do what they want. In Japan, Yohmei reveals Hao dates back to a thousand years ago when every Asakura member gave their best to defeat him, though it was too late, for he had already mastered god-like abilities, allowing him to manipulate his own life and reincarnate at will. Yohmei explains Asakura's purpose is to defeat Hao. He asks Anna to deliver the Chou Senji Ryakketsu, the book containing Hao's initial techniques, to Yoh.
34	"American Hot Springs" / "The Great Western Spa"; Transliteration: "Amerika Onsen" (Japanese: アメリカ温泉)	Kazuki Kakuta; Tsuyoshi Nagasawa	Akihiko Inari	February 27, 2002	November 13, 2004
meanwhile In Japan, Yohmei explains that if Yoh manages to master Chou Senji Ryakketsu's teachings, he will reach Hao's power level of a thousand years ago. However, he explains the book is sealed and protected by Zenki and Kouki, two Shikigami loyal to Hao. Tamao accidentally breaks the seal and sets both creatures free, but Anna quickly learns how to tame them. Back to the United States, Hao bleeds as a result of his Shikigami's defeat and remarks he didn't imagine anyone in the Asakura family could have such power. Meanwhile, Sharona is attacked by Tilda, a former school colleague and eternal rival, and has her guardian ghost, Enra Enra, stolen. Yoh's group reaches a Hot Spring district where they discuss the X-Laws and Yoh's supposed link to Hao. There, Tilda tries to lure each of them to an ambush using Enra-Enra's power of assuming anyone's form, but her cover is blown in every attempt, except when she manages to lure Lyserg using an image of an X-Laws' member Marco. However, Sharona and her friends arrive and defeat Tilda, retrieving Enra-Enra. Later on, Boris is seen bowing before Hao.
35	"The Vampire Legend" / "Vampire Ambush"; Transliteration: "Kyūketsuki Densetsu" (Japanese: 吸血鬼伝説)	Osamu Satō	Shō Aikawa	March 6, 2002	November 20, 2004
A little boy named Boris and his parents are seen fleeing from a horde of men with torches and swords. They are eventually surrounded at the edge of a cliff, where both parents are accused of vampirism and executed, but not before the mother is able to push Boris down to the river below, saving him. Somewhere else, the man seen in the end of the previous episode is seen again next to the spirit of the leader of Boris' parents killers. Later, Yoh and the others find a church where they plan to spend the night and Ryu watches a vampire movie. He ends up attacked by the man, who is revealed to be an actual vampire. Meanwhile, the X-Laws, aware of the presence of a follower of Hao in the area, isolate the town. Concerned with Lyserg, Milly enters the city, followed by Elly, but the rest is prevented from following them. Ren deduces Ryu was attacked by a shaman sent by Hao, but Tokageroh rejects the idea, stating that the attacker vanished in the air, which is not a human ability. Suddenly, Ryu awakes as a vampire and tries to attack Milly and Elly, but HoroHoro stops him with ice. Later, Lyserg mentions the story of Bram Stoker's Dracula, which Ren rejects as pure fiction. However, the church's priest tells the story of Vlad Dracula, the man who inspired the novel's title character. Later, the boys take turns in watching over Ryu. Lyserg approaches the X-Laws and asks them how to save Ryu, but the blond man replies that, in order to defeat Hao, he must stop regretting his beloved ones' death and even his own. Meanwhile, the ice keeping Ryu melts much before expected following a sabotage by a spirit working for the priest, who is revealed to be a shaman serving the vampire. Ryu breaks free and attacks HoroHoro, curing himself but turning his friend into a vampire. Following his conversation with the X-Laws, Lyserg emerges and attempts to kill HoroHoro, but Yoh stops him. Lyserg them asks Yoh to promise him he will kill him if he ever becomes a vampire. The priest lures Milly and Elly to a catacomb where he attempts to kill them, but he ends up killed by the vampire, who discards him as only human. Yoh and the others reach the place and the vampire introduces himself as Boris Tepes Dracula. He is capable of vanishing and materializing with incredible speed and eventually bites Lyserg. Meanwhile, the X-Laws march towards the church. In Japan, the elder woman seen with Yohmei at the end of episode 30 emerges and is revealed to be Kino, Yohmei's wife, and Yoh's grandmother. They ask Anna to deliver the Chou Senji Ryakketsu to Yoh in the United States and she leaves with Manta and Tamao.
36	"Angel's Pistol" / "Winged Destroyers"; Transliteration: "Tenshi no Pisutoru" (Japanese: 天使のピストル)	Tamaki Nakatsu	Shō Aikawa	March 13, 2002	November 27, 2004
Ryu and HoroHoro manage to attack Boris and send him to the cinema above the catacombs. Yoh and Ren join them to defeat the vampire while Milly and Elly head back outside where the X-Laws reveal their plan to exterminate everyone inside the cinema so that Boris is erased. However, the Lilly Five group (as Yoh now calls the five ladies) join forces to stop them following Milly's concern with Lyserg's possible death. Back inside, Ren deduces Boris is just a human with shamanic capabilities, explaining he just uses his guardian spirit to control other people and fool others into believing they are vampires, which explains why he can only control one victim at a time. Lyserg captures Yoh and Boris' guardian ghost, Blamuro, manifests himself. Boris corners Yoh's friends in a way that they must either stand still and die or escape and have Yoh bitten by Lyserg as a response. A third option would be to simply kill Lyserg and save Yoh. However, Yoh allows himself to be bitten and reveals he was embodied by Amidamaru, who subdued Blamuro when he attempted to take control of Yoh. Ren goes further on his deductions and realize Boris uses blood as a medium for spirits of bats, and his blood-soaked mantis the secret behind his ability to vanish. Ren finishes him off, but Blamuro stays to defend his master, to everyone's surprise. Blamuro explains he chased and killed Boris' parents out of obsession with defeating Vlad Dracula's descendants and being regarded as a hero. After realizing they were just ordinary humans, he spent his next years searching for Boris. He eventually found him as an adult standing by Hao and was killed to become his guardian ghost, which he happily accepted. Boris says he always thought he controlled Blamuro against his own will and leaves for the church, where he is attacked by the X-Laws. but Yoh defends him, saying he has his own reasons and justice is not about killing. He eventually says they are just like Hao, which infuriates them and ignites a lethal-force reaction. However, Boris sacrifices himself for Yoh and the X-Laws leave with their new recruit, Lyserg. By the church entrance, they find the Lilly Five passed out following the fight with the X-Laws, and Ryu tries to show him how cruel they can be towards Milly. as Lyserg replies that they received such treatment for being weak and ultimately leaves with his new group. Yoh and the others set Blamuro free to rejoin Boris in hell and leave. In Japan, Anna and Manta are seen taking off to the United States with one of the Oyamada family's plane.
37	"Joke King" / "Punch Line"; Transliteration: "Jōdan Kingu" (Japanese: ジョーダンキング)	Setsuo Takase	Katsuhiko Chiba	March 20, 2002	December 4, 2004
As Yoh and his friends reach a small city called YontaFe and discuss how they will resume their journey now that Lyserg joined the X-Laws and left them with nobody with similar information-finding skills. They end up meeting Chocolove, an Afro-American shaman who offers himself to be their new member since most shamans are travelling in groups to raise their chances of survival. He also says he is good in finding information, reveals he knows all their names and introduces Mick, the Jaguar, as his guardian spirit, which allows him to use its fine speed. However, he tells lots of unfunny jokes and does not seem strong, which causes the team to be reluctant about allowing him in the group. Chocolove explains he wants to be the Shaman King in order to become the world's greatest comedian and make it a better place with "the winds of laughter". Suddenly, Zenryou emerge and attack Yoh's group, but are easily and repeatedly dispatched by Ren. The group realizes something's wrong when they keep coming back after multiple defeats, showing inhuman endurance. Ren realizes they will have to kill both opponents to end the fight. Chocolove has a memory of his master back in New York City ending a hostage situation by simply telling the criminal a joke, which eventually caused him to peacefully surrender. Some time later, the master fell ill and died, leaving Mick as Chocolove's guardian spirit. Back to the present, Chocolove uses Mick's senses to uncover Peyote, one of Hao's followers. It is revealed that Zenryou are actually unconscious and their bodies are being controlled by Carlos and Juan, two Mariachis who are now Peyote's spirits. Chocolove dodges Zenryou's attacks and reaches Peyote, who reveals several other spirits: Antonio, José, Pancho, Zapata and Miguel. However, Chocolove uses his special attack, Ayers Rock, to make Peyote's spirits laugh and become vulnerable, allowing Ryu and HoroHoro to dispatch him. Later, Chocolove reveals a person named Lilirara lives in town and knows the location of the Patch Village. Meanwhile, the blond X-Laws member tells Lyserg he will take him to the clan's leader, Jeanne. Also, Anna, Manta and Tamao arrive in the United States and meet Faust VIII at the airport. faust asks Anna to help him reuniting with Eliza and offers to help Yoh in return.
38	"The Legend of Seminoa" / "Five Great Chiefs"; Transliteration: "Seminoa no denshōka" (Japanese: セミノアの伝承歌)	Shigeru Ueda	Katsuhiko Chiba	March 27, 2002	December 11, 2004
As The group reaches the house of Lilirara, a descendant from the warriors of the Seminoa tribe, who fought on the last Shaman Fight 500 years ago. However, she tells them to go back home because the Patch prists lied to them and are organizing another Shaman Fight despite the "tragedy" brought during the previous one. Using the power of five Seminoa spirits, she has the group feel the pain they felt 500 years ago without actually hurting their bodies. At the boys' request, she uses her power to allow them to witness the Seminoa's memories of the last Shaman Fight 500 years ago. The group soon finds out the Seminoa fought and were killed by Hao's second and previous incarnation, which strongly resembled Silva. Looking for clues leading to the Patch Village, Yoh's group ask Lilirara to repeatedly send them back to the warrior's memories so they can collect as many info as possible. The group eventually questions why the warriors are willing to revive their own painful deaths over and over, and the Seminoa respond by engaging in a fight with them. Yoh and his friends manage to defeat them and they head to the other world, freeing Lilirara from the Seminoa obligations. On their way, they give them tips leading to the Patch Village. At the airport, Anna explains she invited Faust to join Yoh's group because he is strong and will become the doctor of the future Funbari Hot Spring she plans to build. They eventually meet Jun and Pai Long, who went to the United States to check on Ren, and invite them to join them on their journey to find Yoh and the others. Later, they head to YontaFe looking for Yoh but end up in a city named LoctaFe.
39	"Flower Team" / "Goth Assault"; Transliteration: "Hanagumi" (Japanese: 花組)	Tsuyoshi Nagasawa	Akihiko Inari	April 3, 2002	December 18, 2004
On their way to find Patch Village, Yoh, and the others end up in a canyon. There, they meet Lilly Five, who trick Yoh into telling them how to get to the village and leave without offering them a ride. Meanwhile, Hao and Opacho watch from afar and the former tells the trio of girls seen in episode 21 to attack the group without killing Yoh. He also confirms if they are "aware of Anna". Soon later, Anna and her group stumble upon him and he explains he wants the Chou Senji Ryakketsu to be delivered as fast as possible to Yoh so he can become stronger and aid him in the future. Anna eventually tries to slap him, but she is blocked for the first time. However, she is able to hit him with her other hand. Hao leaves and once again asks her to deliver the teachings as fast as possible. Later, they have Lilly Five give them a ride. Meanwhile, the three girls challenge Yoh and the others for a fight overseen by Hao and easily overcome the boys, defeating them all. As they attempt to finish Yoh off, Anna emerges and saves him with Zenki and Kouki. Following Hao's orders not to confront Anna, the trio leaves. Meanwhile, Lyserg is seen wearing his new X-Laws uniform and standing next to an iron maiden. Marco of the X-Laws says their master will bless him.
40	"Chou Senji Ryakketsu" / "A Touch of Evil"; Transliteration: "Chō Senjiryakketsu" (Japanese: 超・占事略決)	Shigeru Ueda	Katsuhiko Koide	April 10, 2002	January 22, 2005
As Yoh's and Anna's groups discuss Hao's powers and Anna tells Yoh he must begin his training. She is reluctant about letting the others take part of this possibly deadly experience and getting involved with the Asakura affairs, but Yoh ends up joined by Ren, HoroHoro, Ryu, Chocolove and Faust. Meanwhile, from within her iron maiden, Jeanne tells Marco of the X-Laws he must check on Yoh before he comes into contact with Hao's power. In another dimension, the group travels through the mind and memories of the first incarnation of Hao, where he shows them his abilities and explains how shamans and normal humans are different and how humans are incapable of feeling, understanding and respecting the Earth's nature. In the end, he bestows them with his power. Meanwhile, Hao meets Manta next to the training site and gives him similar explanations, which disturbs Manta, since he is only human. The group comes back visibly shook-up. Suddenly, Jeanne, Lyserg and the blond X-Laws member drop from the sky and the latter puts the group to a sudden test, hitting them outright. The iron maiden face opens, revealing the face of a little girl inside, who smiles and closes the face again. The group easily blocked the attack using their new, powerful and still shadowy Over Souls. Following the brief fight, Hao comments to himself on Yoh's strength and everyone is excited with their new powers. Anna gives Yoh a small ancient sword sent by Yohmei. Manta notices Amidamaru is apparently disturbed with something.
41	"Explosive Over Souls" / "Goth Rematch"; Transliteration: "Baretsu Ōbā Sōru" (Japanese: 爆れつオーバーソウル)	Kazuki Kakuta	Akihiko Inari	April 17, 2002	January 29, 2005
As Hao orders the three girls to challenge Yoh's group again to test their new strength. Meanwhile, Jeanne tells her subordinates to observe the group and the blond member and Lyserg are sent to accomplish the task. As they discuss the possibility of Yoh and the others joining them, Hao appears and tells them Yoh is not willing to join neither him or the X-Laws and warns them to stop messing with his descendant. Yoh contemplates his new sword while Amidamaru is still seemingly disturbed with something. Suddenly, he instinctively points the way to the Patch Village. Before they move, however, the female trio emerges and challenges them once again. Yoh, Ren and Ryu accept the challenge and this time the girls are easily overcome, despite the boys just using their ordinary Over Souls. Realizing the boys are much stronger, the girls unleash their Over Souls at full power, growing them to a gigantic size. The boys respond by revealing their new, also gigantic Over Souls and the two younger girls are defeated with just one hit each by Ren and Ryu. Yoh, however, is initially unable to precisely control his new over Soul against the older woman. Using his new sword combined with Harusame, however, he is able to finally defeat his opponent. Amidamaru feels he could become even greater and seems to be finally OK. At her church, Jeanne reveals her face again with another happy smile. The girls are visibly frustrated with their defeat, and Anna explains they will always be limited by Hao, while Yoh is free to grow endlessly. Hao suddenly materializes and congratulates Yoh on his evolution. He also says he will soon retrieve Yoh's body, which "belongs to him", and says farewell to his "little brother", shocking everyone. After he leaves, Mikihisa emerges and confirms Hao and Yoh are twins.
42	"Spirit of Sword" / "The Double Medium"; Transliteration: "Supiritto Obu Sōdo" (Japanese: スピリットオブソード)	Osamu Satō	Katsuhiko Koide	April 24, 2002	February 5, 2005
Mikihisa explains that 13 years ago, when Yoh and Hao were about to be born, he, Yohmei, Kino and Keiko (the boys' mother) were aware that one of them was Hao's resurrection, but they could not tell the villain from the innocent child, so they decided to execute both at birth. However, Hao was born already too powerful and avoided the attack, severely burning Mikihisa in the process (which explains his bird mask). Before leaving, he warned them Yoh was his other half and he would return to retrieve it one day. Despite this, the family was happy, since Yoh's sacrifice was avoided. Meanwhile, Amidamaru starts a process of evolution after which he will reach a sacred spirit status. The X-Laws appear and Lyserg invites Yoh's group to join them to compensate for their sin of acquiring Hao's power and help Jeanne built the Gate of Babylon, which, according to them, will erase all evil from the Earth, including Hao. They refuse, and the X-Laws attack them. Ren, Horo-Horo, Ryu and Chocolove become their opponents while Yoh waits for Amidamaru to be ready and Faust takes the rest to a safer point. When Amidamaru is finally done, Yoh forms a new Over Soul, Spirit of Sword, that takes the form of a giant light sword and defeats the angels. The X-Laws leave and Anna explains Yoh has just learned how to use a double medium by incorporating Amidamaru in Harusame and then merging it with his new sword, which is called Futsu no Mitama no Tsurughi.
43	"Battle of Gods" / "Lost Lyserg"; Transliteration: "Kamigami no Tatakai" (Japanese: 神々の闘い)	Shigeru Ueda	Shō Aikawa	May 1, 2002	February 12, 2005
The episode starts with a brief speech by an Egyptian shaman about how Ancient Egypt was the place of birth of shamanism. Then, Jeanne tells the blond X-Laws member (now introduced as Marco) she is willing to meet Yoh personally to try and change him. Meanwhile, Yoh and the others reach a town filled with Shaman Fight participants. At a bar, Ren questions why so many shamans are gathered peacefully and a shaman next to them explains the town is being visited by many God-class Shamans and nobody would want to end up fighting one of them. He also says the Shaman King must be perfect in everything. Ren is disturbed and leaves, only to be approached by Hao and offered a place in his group, which he refuses. HoroHoro, Chocolove and Manta catch up with Ren and Hao leaves. The group is then mistaken for Hao's followers and attacked by two shamans accompanying the one who spoke to Ren before. He shows up and clears up the misunderstanding. Everyone notices a commotion nearby and find the Egyptian shamans shown in the beginning of the episode, now identified as the Niles, subduing Zenryou and intending to use them as baits to attract and defeat Hao. When the Niles' leader, Anatel, starts speaking in the name of God, Jeanne, Marco and Lyserg intervene and reprehend him for doing so. Anatel challenges them for a battle and Lyserg easily destroys Nahkt's and Khafre's (Anatel's best friends) over Souls and overpowers the trio's leader. After a bitter speech by Lyserg about justice which shocks his former teammates, Anatel breaks free and unleashes his over Soul formed by 10,000 feathers embodied by the souls of the ones who built the Pyramids. Unable to attack all feathers, Lyserg decides to apply lethal force in Anatel, but Yoh tells him not to do so and the attack stops. Lyserg tries to blame Morphine but Marco and Jeanne believe he hesitated. Jeanne then decides to personally finish the battle and finally steps out of her iron maiden. Everyone is shocked to see she is just a little girl embraced by thorny roots. She explains she chose to be trapped in the cage and to be continually pierced by the thorns so that she suffers for the sins of humankind and is given the strength to make the world a better place in return. Using her gigantic guardian spirit, Shamash, she easily subdues the Niles and offers them a chance of repentance. They refuse and are consequently executed. Later, Marco punishes Lyserg and says he deliberately stopped the attack after hearing Yoh.
44	"One More Push" / "The Ice Team Cometh"; Transliteration: "Mō Hito Funbari" (Japanese: もうひとふんばり)	Kazuki Kakuta; Tsuyoshi Nagasawa	Shō Aikawa	May 8, 2002	February 19, 2005
A little boy named Pino flees from a group of people who want to offer him to Badb and takes shelter inside an ice cave, where he meets the goddess in its crow form and is asked if he wants her to be his. Back to the United States, the trio of shamans Yoh's group encountered before the Niles introduce themselves as the Icemen, hailing from the cold regions of Ireland and led by Pino, whom the other two are helping to become Shaman King. They are annoyed with Yoh's group talking about their recently increased powers and challenge them for a fight. Ryu, Faust and a reluctant Yoh become their opponents. The Icemen launch a combined attack, but Faust blocks it with his new Over Soul, Mephisto E. He then explains Anna has brought Eliza's spirit back in its whole form, allowing him to finally reunite with her. His purpose of life fulfilled, he swore loyalty to her and Yoh out of gratitude. Ryu also manages to block a combined attack and explains he will also protect Yoh and help him become Shaman King because he believes Yoh will create a better world. When Yoh finally decides to join the fight, his tranquility of mind eventually overcomes Icemen's power and Pino becomes less obsessed in proving his strength.
45	"Great Spirits" / "Dobi Village or Bust"; Transliteration: "Gurēto Supirittsu" (Japanese: グレートスピリッツ)	Tamaki Nakatsu	Katsuhiko Koide	May 15, 2002	February 26, 2005
While following the Seminoa's clues to the Patch Village, the group stumble upon large ruins that they did not see in the night before. While exploring it, they are taken to a place where they see a large column of light. Soon after, Yoh wakes up in a ghost town where he finds Ren, HoroHoro, Ryu, Chocolove and Faust passed out on a tree protected by an invisible shield. Yoh tries to break the shield while a voice tells him to go away until he suddenly wakes up again next to Silva, who welcomes him to the Patch village. Yoh meets his friends (including Anna, Manta, Jun and Tamao, who reached the location via other means) and Hao approaches them, explaining that the column of light is the Great Spirit, an entity that gathers all formless souls and serves both as the source and final destination of all spirits on Earth. Goldva (the female leader of the Patches) announces the rules of the Second Round and all shamans must form groups of three in order to compete. Yoh teams up with Ryu and Faust and Ren forms a trio with HoroHoro and Chocolove. Yoh's friends also remind him of how he broke through the shield and found out the tree was just an illusion for the Great Spirit to bless him, an experience all his five friends had too. Two kids are seen angrily watching Jun from afar.
46	"The Dead Spirit of Tao" / "Family Feud"; Transliteration: "Tao no Bōrei" (Japanese: 道の亡霊)	Kazuki Kakuta	Katsuhiko Koide	May 22, 2002	March 5, 2005
Team Noroshi, composed of Gei Yin and the two kids seen in the end of the previous episode, is seen winning a Shaman Fight and Gei says Ren better have his neck ready for her. Later, Yoh and the others witness Team Moon (formed by three of Hao's followers) quickly win another match. Anna names Yoh's group as Funbari Onsen (in reference to the future hotel she plans to build), while Ren registers his group with HoroHoro and Chocolove as The Rens without consulting them, much to their dislike. Meanwhile, Jun is attacked by the two kids, but Ren and Gei - who is revealed to be their older sister - intervene and stop them. Gei explains she wants revenge on Ren for having rejected his responsibilities as Tao's heir, which lead to her being discarded by the family, and says she will do so in their match, scheduled for the day after. Later, Jun remarks that by giving up on Tao's legacy, she and Ren have led many people to lose their positions and that they are indeed traitors to many. As the battle starts, Ren tells his partners to stay back and barely defends himself, allowing several hits by Team Noroshi. Yoh deduces he is allowing his body to take all the hatred from Gei's heart. Ren finally apologizes to them and promises to extinguish all their hatred once he becomes Shaman King. He then uses his Houraiken in battle for the first time and wins.
47	"Really Naive" / "Sand Storm"; Transliteration: "Mera Junjō" (Japanese: メラ純情)	Koi Kokubunji	Katsuhiko Chiba	May 29, 2002	March 12, 2005
Ryu is seen in the middle of a sandstorm facing an Arabic shaman next to an Arabic woman. Some time before, while going for a walk around the village with Manta, Ryu meets a girl called Anise (the woman seen in the beginning of the episode), who is a member of Team Arabian and shares with him the wish of finding the Best Place. As he tries to flert with her, her fiancé, Haloun, emerges and beats him for trying to approach her. He also slaps her in the face for talking to another man, says Ryu comes from a rich country that is always yearning for more resources while he hails from a country were every drop of water counts and leaves. Later, Ryu finds out Team Arabian will be their first adversary in the second round. In the battle, set in a vast desert, Haloun has his second teammate create a sandstorm so he can fight Ryu personally while the third member deals with Yoh and Faust and Anise watches. Haloun keeps dismissing Ryu's dream as quite foolish, while Ryu asks Anise if she truly trusts her fiancé to make her dream come true, comparing their marriage to his voluntary choice of trusting his dream to Yoh. Ryu eventually wins the battle and Haloun is frustrated. Anise tells him she would have wanted to marry him even if their parents did not arrange it and Haloun says it is reciprocated.
48	"Dragon Missionary" / "The Prophecy"; Transliteration: "Doragon no Dendōshi" (Japanese: ドラゴンの伝道師)	Hibari Kurihara	Akihiko Inari	June 5, 2002	March 19, 2005
as HoroHoro walks by a public speech by Ronny, a fanatic catholic priest who says kids like him should not take part of the Shaman Fight, for they are not mature enough to handle the Great Spirit. Also, he finds Pirika amidst the crowd, who has come to pay him a visit in Patch Village. The priest approaches him again later with his two teammates (Ouji and Aiyomi) and dismisses his dream of building a vast field of petasites as narrow-minded. In a third encounter, all their oracles ring announcing them as adversaries. In the battle, Ren and Chocolove make short work of Ouji and Aiyomi, but Ronny has his over Soul swallow HoroHoro and engulf him in a world of darkness where HoroHoro is unable to Over Soul. With his sister's love and focusing on his dream, he is able to muster up some power and defeat Ronny, who finally recognizes him as worthy of the title of Shaman King.
49	"Doctor Doctor" / "Gladiators"; Transliteration: "Dokutā Dokutā" (Japanese: ドクタードクター)	Kazuki Kakuta	Katsuhiko Koide; Hiroyuki Nakamura	June 12, 2002	March 26, 2005
Manta and Faust assist Maya, a woman they saw fainting by a square. She is later joined by her husband Ados and her son Melos, with whom she forms Team Enseios, and they leave when the oracle announces their next fight, visibly uncomfortable. Later, while Faust seems somewhat concerned with the family, the boys learn they are able to lend their furyoku to each other. In the next morning, they watch the family's match and witness as Maya and Melos lend their powers to Ados, who wins the fight but ends up exhausted while his wife faints again. Meanwhile, Manta grows disappointed with Faust for being a doctor and not warning them against risking their lives like that. Yoh's group is announced as their next opponents and Faust asks to fight them alone. The doctor destroys the family's combo over Soul multiple times, but they remake it every time until they end up too exhausted to Over Soul again and lose. Faust tells Melos he will treat his passed out parents and then he will dedicate himself to finding a cure for his disease, revealing the reason why the family took the Shaman Fight so seriously. Manta later would apologize to Faust.
50	"I Have a Darkness in My Heart" / "Heart of Darkness"; Transliteration: "Ore no Kokoro nya Yami ga Aru" (Japanese: オレの心にゃ闇がある)	Toshimasa Suzuki	Shō Aikawa	June 19, 2002	April 2, 2005
Silva tells Yoh, Anna, Manta, Tamao and Ryu that Nichrom, one of the ten priests, has been acting strange lately. He then asks about Ren, leaving the guys confused about Ren's relation to it. Team Ren is visited by Nichrom, who tells Ren he is the younger brother of Chrom, the priest Ren killed during the Shaman Fight admission test. He also informs he had his hatred removed by someone called Nyorai and says he should talk to her to be cleansed too. Nichrom leaves and Silva arrives, but is almost attacked by Ren, who mistook him for Chrom. The team discusses the situation while a frog-faced humanoid figure stands above their room, unbeknownst to them. Meanwhile, Nichrom and several shamans are seen flocking to a temple where they bow before Nyorai, who is accompanied by three fighters. Silva oversees the situation and is informed by Hao that Nyorai is the leader of Team Dairedo and removes darkness from people's hearts. Hao also taunts him by suggesting he is the descendant of his reincarnation of 500 years ago. After he leaves, Silva heads towards the temple but is paralyzed by three shadowy figures who leave right before Mikihisa materializes behind him. Back to Team Ren, Ren grows increasingly mad and ends up fainting. HoroHoro asks Chocolove to make up a story for Yoh and the others and takes Ren to Nyorai, but she taunts him about him not being able to overcome Yoh and he ends up succumbing to her too. On the next morning, HoroHoro heads back to his room, where everybody cleans up the mess caused by Ren, and attacks Yoh, expressing frustration for not winning him back in their first-round match (see episode 14). Anna's two shinigami's subdue HoroHoro and Chocolove takes him back to Nyorai, without telling the guys what was going on. Faust arrives and tells everybody Team Ren's next fight has been determined. Chocolove confronts Nyorai saying she uses the frog-faced figure to create illusions and Silva complements explaining she does so in order to convert possible opponents in new followers, causing them to forfeit the matches. Then, he announces the beginning of the fight between Team Ren and Team Dairedo, overseen by the three shadowy figures. HoroHoro is still confused by Nyorai and ends up attacking his own partners while Ren' refusal to recognize the darkness in his heart leads him to lose control of his Over Soul. Nyorai tries to dominate Chocolove using his failure as a comedian against him but he is able to overcome it with a joke. Ren and HoroHoro are freed from Nyorai and the team defeats her fighters, who are revealed to be just stones over souled by the girl, who is then disqualified for failing to form a three-member team. Chocolove later makes her let go of her cult and become a normal girl.
51	"Shaman Hunt" / "Spirit Busters"; Transliteration: "Shāman Hanto" (Japanese: シャーマンハント)	Tsuyoshi Nagasawa	Shō Aikawa	June 26, 2002	April 9, 2005
As The scene from the previous episode in which Silva is paralyzed by three shadowy figures is shown again and they say "the hunt for shamans is on" while mentioning Amidamaru. Mikihisa writes a spell to free Silva and says they are specialized in exorcising evil spirits. The group is later seen holding Lilly Five captive while extracting images of Yoh and Amidamaru and showing a particular interest in Manta. Afterwards, they exorcise the ladies guardian ghosts and leave, while some writings show up in the girls' mediums. Later, Yoh's team learns from Silva that several shamans have left Patch Village, causing many matches to be cancelled. Ryu screams and alerts them, who arrive in time to see Tokageroh being exorcised and Ryu's sword being covered in writings just like it happened with Lilly Five. Meanwhile, the group is seen holding Mosuke captive and later force him to possess Manta and make him flee. Amidamaru senses Mosuke's presence and looks for him, but ends up overhearing a conversation about him being supposedly evil. Yoh and the others find Manta forging a weapon by a campfire and are confronted by the group's leader, who introduces herself as Fudou. Mikihisa emerges and explains they worked together in the past. Fudou tries to capture Amidamaru, who offers no resistance. Amidamaru explains he was out of control just after death and had his spirit pacified and his grave crafted by a figure using Fudou's powers, which is why he is not willing to fight her back and even agrees with her that he possessed Yoh and forced him to fight. Yoh replies that they are actually friends and that Yoh lends his body to Amidamaru in exchange for his power. Fudou then orders the Mosuke-possessed Manta to attack them. As he walks, he mentally talks to Mosuke and they decide to somehow Over Soul in order to have Mosuke break his chains, even at the risk of hurting Manta. Manta uses his laptop as a medium and they successfully form a hammer-like Over Soul, hitting Fudou's group with it. Yoh pretends to be possessed and mad just to scare Fudou and unmakes his Over Soul. Mikihisa explains Fudou was possessed by evil spirits before, which is why she grew scared and angry at spirits in general, and she leaves. Mosuke disappears and everybody thinks he returned to paradise, but he is actually trapped in Manta's laptop.
52	"Special Training!? Everyone Gather!" / "The Way of the Rice"; Transliteration: "Tokkun da yo!? Zenin Shūgō" (Japanese: 特訓だよ!? 全員集合)	Tamaki Nakatsu	Katsuhiko Chiba	July 3, 2002	April 16, 2005
as Everybody watches Team Hoshigumi's (formed by Hao, Opacho, and Luchist) first match, in which Hao quickly burns his opponents alive and wins the battle alone. Later, as they discuss the fight, Mikihisa emerges and proposes a training match between Team The Ren and Team Funbari Onsen in order to determine who is stronger and in order for them to start figuring ways of fighting Hao. Faust has his Mephisto E. mount Ryu's Yamata no Orochi and wield Yoh's Spirit of Sword while HoroHoro has his Biran Birantte Kamui mount Chocolove's Steel Wheels and wield Ren's Bushin. However, Mikihisa orders two of his guardian ghosts to crawl around the combined over Souls, eventually causing them to break down. Mikihisa explains their furyoku is still far from Hao's and that it is not about size or even pure power. He then has them write the names of people or things that are important to them in small rice grains and spread the grains around the vast desert surrounding the village. Their next task is to find their grains, but no one makes it after several hours. Eventually, Team Funbari Onsen's next match is announced and Mikihisa proposes they fight using their ordinary Over Souls. However, the team proves unable to defeat their adversaries without resorting to the recently developed Over Souls and end up disappointed despite the victory. Later, they head to a restaurant and arrive just in time to find out that Team Lilly Five's first opponent in the second round will be Team Hoshi-Gumi.
53	"Bye Bye" / "Double Jeopardy"; Transliteration: "Baibai" (Japanese: バイバイ)	Hiroshi Kimura	Katsuhiko Chiba	July 10, 2002	April 23, 2005
Team Lily Five is willing to face Hao despite the risk of losing their own lives and Yoh is worried about them. He even asks Hao to spare them, to no avail. Moments before the match, he tests the girls so they have a taste of Hao's immense power. After several failed attempts, the girls have bad memories of their bad times living among humans and finally manage to gently hit him with a combined attack of their five guardian ghosts. However, Yoh reminds them they must achieve the same with just three members and they finally decide to give up, causing Hao to feel slightly annoyed. Anna remarks how the ladies managed to irritate Hao, which makes them legends. Meanwhile, Team The Ren decide to reject Mikihisa's training, but he asks them if their methods will really make them stronger. Ren then challenges him for a fight and sees all his attacks miss the target. He eventually manages to hit him and Mikihisa leaves. Yoh later meets Ren at the desert and both manage to find two grains, but not the ones belonging to them.
54	"The Eighth Angel" / "X-Caliber"; Transliteration: "Hachi-Banme no Tenshi" (Japanese: 8番目の天使)	Kazuki Kakuta; Tsuyoshi Nagasawa	Katsuhiko Koide	July 17, 2002	April 30, 2005
Everybody watches Marco and Lyserg defeating a team composed of some minor, black-suited Hao followers. Marco intends to execute them after his victory, but Silva stops him despite not being allowed to do so. Meanwhile, Hao offers Fudou a place in his group. When her two friends interfere in the conversation, Hao has two of his followers kill them, infuriating Fudou, who ends up killed as well, with her soul being eaten by the Spirit of Fire in the process. Later, Yoh and his friends discuss Lyserg's cold attitudes. Lyserg desperately wishes to be bestowed with an angel by Jeanne like his fellow X-Laws members, but Marco suggests his heart is still in doubt and that he will have to let go of Morphine. He then departs with three other X-Laws to face their previous opponents once again. Lyserg is ordered to stay behind but later decides to go fight as well. Morphine follows him, but eventually stops and goes ask Yoh and the others for help. The X-Laws are about to face the three black-suited men, but Lyserg shows up and tries to attack them, only to find out Morphine was missing. Marco and the others take Hao's men out and Yoh's group arrives. Lyserg reprehends Morphine for her disappearing and leaves with the X-Laws, disappointing everyone again. As he walks away, he drops his pendulum and Morphine leaves in tears. Soon after, Jeanne gives him his angel, Zelel, while the Gate of Babylon is almost finished.
55	"Gate of Babylon" / "Bait and Switch"; Transliteration: "Gēto Obu Babiron" (Japanese: ゲートオブバビロン)	Tamaki Nakatsu	Akihiko Inari	July 24, 2002	July 2, 2005
Marco tells Lyserg the X-Laws are planning to kidnap Yoh to lure Hao into the Gate of Babylon. Meanwhile, while Yoh and the others are still in a bad mood following Lyserg's incident, Manta finds out his laptop is malfunctioning. Then, he follows Ryu, the most depressed of all, into the woods, where he ends up kidnapped by Lyserg as a bait for Yoh. In the process, Lyserg takes Ryu down with just one hit and demands him to tell Yoh where to go. While Manta is being held hostage within a tight iron cage, his laptop turns on again and starts energizing itself, unbeknownst to him. When Yoh arrives with his friends, Marco tells him to bow before Jeanne within a magical pitch. Manta's desperate attempts to talk Yoh off doing so end up with Mosuke Over Souling again and breaking their cage. Marco and Lyserg then attempt to capture Yoh by force, but Jeanne decides to personally deal with the situation. Using Shamash's powers, she traps Yoh's group within a cage where they are unable to Over Soul. As she prepares to send them through the gate, Hao emerges and burns her.
56	"Door of Babylon" / "The Door to Babylon"; Transliteration: "Babiron no Tobira" (Japanese: バビロンの扉)	Hibari Kurihara	Katsuhiko Koide	July 31, 2002	July 9, 2005
Jeanne survives Hao's fire attack and gets back inside her iron maiden to recover. Lyserg is frustrated, but his fellow X-Laws members point the still-standing cage as a proof of her good condition. Then, they engage in a massive battle against Hao's followers, with Porf, Dengbat, and Larch eventually dying. Meanwhile, Silva can't stand the Patch's negligence and decides to go intervene in the situation with Kalim, but Mikihisa stops them stating the Gate of Babylon is an actual chance of eliminating Hao. Yoh and his friends also get tired of watching and manage to destroy their cage, causing the X-Laws to believe Jeanne has died. While his friends hold Hao's group and protect the X-Laws, Yoh is briefly tested by Hao. Eventually, Jeanne emerges from her iron maiden and gets the Gate started. Marco deduces she let go of the cage in order to concentrate her powers on the gate. Once it is opened, everyone is sucked by it, but Spirit of Fire captures Shamash before it closes the door. Inside it, Hao and Yoh are able to rescue their respective partners and the gate breaks down, scattering everyone around Patch Village. Hao is seen contemplating his Spirit of Fire feasting on Shamash while his followers rest nearby. Yoh remembers Hao telling him inside the gate that there was no need to continue the Shaman Fight.
57	"The Shaman Fight Ends?" / "Secret Path"; Transliteration: "Shāman Faito Shūryō?" (Japanese: シャーマンファイト終了?)	Tsuyoshi Nagasawa; Kazuki Kakuta	Shō Aikawa	August 7, 2002	July 16, 2005
Yoh and the others take their time to recover and prepare to go after Hao. Meanwhile, Jeanne is treated from her wounds and Lyserg is expelled from the X-Laws. Hao talks to two Shaman Fight priests revealed to be serving him: Zinc and Nichrom. With their guidance, he takes the path to the Great Spirit and attacks Golva and the remaining priests. Mikihisa tries to stop him and fails, but Hao realizes he was just buying time for Yoh and the others. Pirika shows HoroHoro a secret function of the oracle bells that allows one to check how much furyoku every Shaman Fight participant possesses. HoroHoro learns his level is at 9260, but is shocked to find out Hao's. Everybody meets by the entrance to the Great Spirit, where Goldva confirms the Patches are able to measure one's furyoku and reveals Hao's is at over 1,250,000, shocking everyone. The boys take off their oracle bells, signalizing they will be taking a break from the tournament, and start their journey, guided by Silva and Kalim. However, Ren stops, Over Souls and challenges Yoh for a fight.
58	"Flaming Angel" / "The Forbidden Forest"; Transliteration: "Enjō Enjeru" (Japanese: 炎上エンジェル)	Toshimasa Suzuki	Shō Aikawa	August 14, 2002	July 23, 2005
While shamans across Patch Village discuss the situation, the remaining X-Laws head to the Holy Ground of the Stars where the Great Spirit lies. Meanwhile, as they fight, Yoh and Ren learn how to make their Over Souls smaller and more efficient. Ren realizes they can still become stronger and ends the fight. Then, they enter the Forest of No Return, which leads to the Great Spirit. Manta sees Lyserg sneaking in and decides to follow him. Anna also intends to go, but Yohmei and Kino show up and say they've something to show her. At the forest, the group splits up to fight Hao's followers. Meanwhile, the surviving X-Laws members prepare for their final stand against Hao. Lyserg is caught spying on them and has Zelel confiscated. When Hao arrives, he easily defeats Meene and Cebin, who were actually simply sacrificing themselves so Venstar could learn the secret behind Hao's power. Venstar traps himself and Hao inside a magical shield and deduces he uses oxygen as a medium, which Hao calmly confirms. Then, he detonates a powerful grenade in order to burn all oxygen within the cage so Hao cannot Over Soul. However, Hao manages to survive by turning Spirit of Fire into water. As he prepares to feed Spirit of Fire with the trio's souls, Lyserg's will to protect them causes Morphine to absorb them instead and merge with all the angels of deceased X-Laws members, evolving to a larger, new form. Afterwards, the Great Spirit starts manifesting itself.
59	"Holy Ground of the Stars" / "A New Dimension"; Transliteration: "Hoshi no Seichi" (Japanese: 星の聖地)	Tsuyoshi Nagasawa; Kazuki Kakuta	Katsuhiko Chiba	August 21, 2002	July 30, 2005
The Great Spirit creates several pillars of light which everybody uses to reach the Holy Ground of the Stars. On their way, Hao increases his followers' furyoku. Lyserg intends to go too and is given a new pendulum by Jeanne. In the other dimension, Hao, Opacho, and a reluctant Manta lead the way. Yoh, Silva and Kalim come next, but are approached by Zinc and Nichrom, who reveal Silva is Hao's descendant. Silva confirms it and tells Yoh that Hao's last reincarnation was a Patch who wanted to become Shaman King and stole Spirit of Fire, one of the Five Elemental Warriors protected by the Patchs. Silva feels it is his responsibility to stop Hao since he shares his blood. The four priests start a fight and Yoh goes after Hao. Yoh's friends and Hao's gang are the last and engage in a massive battle in which Ren is severely wounded. Meanwhile, Anna's rosary of 1080 beads is put through a ritual that will bestow it with the power to seal Hao.
60	"Friend" / "Unity"; Transliteration: "Tomodachi" (Japanese: 友達)	Tamaki Nakatsu	Katsuhiko Chiba	August 28, 2002	August 6, 2005
Ryu and Chocolove have to fight Hao's gang alone while Faust treats Ren's wound and HoroHoro protects them with an ice shield. The shield eventually succumbs, but Lyserg joins the fight and evens the odds, taking Peyote out in the process. However, he is soon put in danger, but Ren awakens much stronger than before, saves him and knocks out the entire gang alone. Lyserg apologizes for his behavior as an X-Laws member and they go after Hao. Meanwhile, Yohmei explains to Anna how the Asakura family managed to defeat Hao with the 1080. After Kino finishes her spell, Anna is given the artifact and heads to the Holy Ground of the Stars. Back to the other dimension, Yoh fights the female trio and easily takes them out. He is then joined by Silva and Kalim following their victory over Zinc and Nichrom. Meanwhile, Hao, Opacho and Manta arrive at a place with two tall pillars protected by a trio of birds who ask them to "show their consciences" and end up easily destroyed by Hao.
61	"Eternal Farewell" / "Yoh and Goodbye"; Transliteration: "Eien ni Sayonara" (Japanese: 永遠のサヨナラ)	Atsushi Ōtsuki	Akihiko Inari	September 4, 2002	August 13, 2005
Hao reaches the Great Spirit and waits for Yoh, who stumble upon more of the Great Spirit's birds by the pillars and fight them with Silva and Kalim. After several failed attempts, Yoh realizes the birds do not attack unless provoked and simply walks past them stating his true conscience is not about fighting. Later, Yoh's friends have their turn against the birds and win with considerable difficulties. Some time after, Jun reaches the pillars and is unable to defeat her bird. Anna emerges and destroys it, but another one materializes for Jun, who realizes she's too weak and decides to stay. Once Yoh catches up with Hao, they start a fight in which Yoh ends up easily overpowered. Hao remarks he has already become sufficiently strong by having Spirit of Fire eat Shamash, but says Yoh annoys him and eats his soul in front of Anna and the other guys, who had just arrived at the scene.
62	"Die! Collision!" / "Rage and Furyoku"; Transliteration: "Dai! Gekitotsu!" (Japanese: DIE・激突!)	Toshimasa Suzuki	Katsuhiko Koide	September 11, 2002	August 20, 2005
Lily Five and Icemen are seen in Patch Village heading towards the battleground. Meanwhile, driven by anger and grief, Yoh's companions fight for revenge against Hao, but he easily overpowers them and states Yoh was never even supposed to exist. Things get worse when Hao takes control of Zenki and Kouki and have them fight his opponents for him while he flies towards the Great Spirit. Manta Over Souls again, attacks the shikigami and reminds his friends their true strength does not come out of violence and hatred. The guys come back to their senses and defeat the beasts. Hao floats by the Great Spirit and it responds by tearing down the magic walls that separate itself from the Patch Village, allowing everyone to see what's happening. Yoh's friends catch up with him and Anna uses the 1080º to hold him still while everyone else attacks the Spirit of Fire at once. However, Hao sets himself free and knocks them away, stating he would never be defeated twice with the same technique. Inside Hao's mind, Yoh travels through some of his memories while an image of Amidamaru appears to be infiltrated among hundreds others.
63	"A Place Where I Belong" / "The King is Dead"; Transliteration: "Aru beki Basho" (Japanese: 在るべき場所)	Hibari Kurihara	Katsuhiko Koide	September 18, 2002	August 27, 2005
Joined by Team Enseios, Lilly Five and Icemen fight a horde of minor Hao's followers. Meanwhile, Yoh's friends keep trying to defeat Hao, who defends himself effortlessly and becomes increasingly annoyed with their persistence despite the power difference. Amidamaru manages to retrieve Yoh's soul and he awakens. All the guys take on Hao, but he manages to have Spirit of Fire eat a part of the Great Spirit. A golden, larger Spirit of Fire emerges and easily takes everyone down except for Yoh, who promises to defeat his twin brother.
64	"Epilogue" / "Long Live the King"; Transliteration: "Epirōgu" (Japanese: エピローグ)	Seiji Mizushima	Katsuhiko Koide	September 25, 2002	September 3, 2005
Yoh gives his best against Hao, but is easily overpowered. When Hao attempts to burn him for good, everyone in Patch Village lend their powers to Yoh, eventually causing Amidamaru to evolve to a giant Over Soul which finally manages to kill Hao. Following the fight, all shamans are teleported to the desert and the village disappears. Goldva determines the Shaman Fight is officially interrupted until the Great Spirit manifests itself again. Yoh, Anna and Manta go back to school while Faust and Eliza stay at their home, Ryu travels on his bike with Tokageroh to pay HoroHoro and Pirika a visit, Chocolove works at a restaurant and performs as a comedian at night, Lyserg is seen studying, Ren and Bason deliver some food sent by Jun at Yoh's house and end up staying for the night and later Yoh, Manta and Amidamaru are seen resting at the cemetery where they all met. Ragou appears again to all shamans as the anime ends with an image of Yoh's oracle bell ringing.
