= Northern Light Group =

American technology company

Northern Light Group, LLC
- Formerly: Northern Light Technology, LLC
- Type: Private
- Industry: Technology
- Founded: 1996
- Headquarters: Boston, Massachusetts, USA
- Products: Web search (early); Enterprise search Research portals
- Brands: SinglePoint
- Number of employees: 55+
- Website: northernlight.com

Northern Light Group, LLC is an American technology company that specializes in enterprise search technology, text analytics solutions and research engines that combine traditional search engine functions with access to non-web based publications. The company provides custom, hosted turnkey solutions for its clients using the software as a service (SaaS) delivery model.

Northern Light markets its research portals under the trade name SinglePoint. Typical applications for SinglePoint research portals are in market research, competitive intelligence, product management, product development, and R&D. Northern Light's client base consists of global companies that typically have more than $10 billion in annual sales.

Northern Light has been selected for more than ten years in a row (as of 2023) as one of the "100 Companies That Matter In Knowledge Management" by KMWorld magazine and as "50 Companies that Matter in AI" in 2023.

== History ==
The company is named after the clipper ship Northern Light, which held the speed record for the San Francisco to Boston voyage for nearly 150 years.

Logo of the Northern Light search engine

From its founding in 1996 until January 2002, Northern Light operated a Web search engine for public use, originally on the domain nlsearch.com. It was regarded at the time as innovative in provision of search based on classification and inclusion of both public and proprietary information resources. During this time period, Northern Light also developed private custom search engines for large corporate clients marketed under the trade name SinglePoint.

In 2002, Northern Light was acquired by Divine, Inc., an enterprise software company. Divine made 28 acquisitions, and Northern Light was the 17th. In 2003, an employee group bought the company from its parent and it is still employee-owned as of 2023 and SinglePoint is its main product line. According to the company's website, as of 2023 Northern Light has 250,000 users of its SinglePoint platform at its corporate clients.
