= Southern Lights (kinetic-light sculpture) =

Art installation

Southern Lights was the first permanent kinetic-light sculpture in the United States, located at the former California First Bank building in La Jolla Centre, San Diego, California. The sculpture was unveiled in 1986 on the 160-foot-tall building at 4660 La Jolla Village Drive.

== Creation ==
The artwork, designed by artist Steven V. Correia, was powered by a 20-watt high-intensity argon laser, which was controlled by a computer program that generated an evolving series of geometric patterns on and around the building's facade and into the night sky. The installation was designed to explore "an interaction of glass, light, and their reflections," enhancing the character of the 11-story, blue-glass-sheathed building after sunset.

The display operated on weekdays evenings, and complied with all federal, state, and local safety regulations. Due to its aerial display, the installation required approval from the FAA.

== Reception ==
Southern Lights faced backlash from Neil Morgan, editor of the San Diego Tribune, who referred to the sculpture as "sky pollution" in a column.

== Second installation ==
A second sculpture was installed at the Design Center (now Qualcomm) located at 6455 Lusk Boulevard in the Mira Mesa neighborhood of San Diego, California. This installation last operated in the mid-1990s.
