= Northern Lights (bluegrass band) =

American progressive bluegrass band

- Northern Lights band 1996. L-R Taylor Armerding, Mike Kropp, Jeff Horton, Bill Henry, Jake Armerding

Background information
- Origin: New England, United States
- Genres: Progressive bluegrass
- Years active: 1975–77, 1982–2010
- Labels: Revonah, Red House Records, Flying Fish, Prime CD Records, Fifty Fifty Music
- Past members: Dan Marcus; Bill Henry; Taylor Armerding; Jake Armerding; Mike Kropp; Alison Brown; Bob Emery; Jeff Horton; Oz Barron; Richard Hand; Joe Walsh; Chris Miles; Dave Dick; Ben Demerath; John Daniel; Mike Barnett; Eric Robertson; Alex MacLeod

Northern Lights was an American progressive bluegrass band formed in 1975 in New England, whose musical career spanned more than three decades. Known for a progressive style of bluegrass playing, the band went through a number of line-up changes through the years and included such personalities as banjoist Alison Brown and multiinstrumentalist Jake Armerding, son of founding member and mandolinist Taylor Armerding, who started playing with the band full-time aged 14, but played occasionally when he was 12. As of 2009, there was no founding member left in the group. Guitarist Bill Henry, who joined the band in 1982, assumed the leadership role and Northern Lights continued to play without interruption as a quintet, consisting of two generation of musicians - Bill Henry, John Daniel and Alex MacLeod as well as young players Eric Robertson and Mike Barnett. The band issued 10 studio recordings and 1 live recording with Vassar Clements, most of which have gone out of print. From 1990's "Take You to the Sky," to the final album One Day (Fifty-Fifty Music), the band fused an eclectic mix of traditional roots music, rock, country, soul and gospel with the high, lonesome vocal sound and instruments of bluegrass. Three of their records also reached the top ten of Bluegrass Unlimited's National Bluegrass Survey.

== History ==
The Northern Lights began in 1975, when Bob Emery, Marty Sachs and Dan Marcus asked mandolinist Taylor Armerding to join them in their progressive bluegrass efforts. This line-up recorded their first, self-titled album in 1976; however, the group split in 1977. After five years, they re-formed again; at the urging of Joe Val, Taylor contacted Alison Brown. She remained in the Northern Lights lineup for the next two years. After Alison moved back to California in 1986, banjoist Mike Kropp took her spot to remain with the band for the next 17 years. Around this time, the band started to enjoy more recognition as a strong progressive bluegrass band, playing in different festivals together with well-known artists such as Tony Rice, Mark O'Connor, Jerry Douglas and Peter Rowan. This would help the band to sign with Flying Fish Records and record their next three CD's under this label.

For part of its history Northern Lights performed as a quartet and hired guest fiddlers such as Alison Krauss, Matt Glaser or Vassar Clements for recording sessions. Jake Armerding started to play with the band occasionally at the age of 12 (in 1990), joining the band full-time 2 years later. The band recorded their two highly acclaimed records with Jake, Wrong Highway Blues in 1994 and Living in the City in 1996. A review of Living in the City in the Toronto Star labeled the group "the finest of modern bluegrass groups". Jake left in 1999 to pursue his own music; Mike Kropp left in 2000 and Taylor Armerding left in 2003. These were the most significant changes to the band line-up to date. Bill Henry took over the lead role and the band recorded New Moon and their last album, One Day in 2008.

Latest line-up of the band as of 2010: Eric Robertson, Alex MacLeod, Mike Barnett, John Daniel, Bill Henry

== Disbandment ==
After some three decades of bringing bluegrass to the Northeast and beyond, Northern Lights decided to close up shop. The band's last official show was at the Rose Garden in Mansfield, MA on March 13, 2010. Several Northern Lights alumni were on hand there to help celebrate the end of a New England institution, including Taylor Armerding, Mike Kropp, Jeff Horton and Dave Dick.

== Discography ==
Recorded under Revonah Records:

- Northern Lights (1976)
- Before the Fire Comes Down(1983)
- On the Edge (1987)

Recorded under Flying Fish Records

- Take You to the Sky (1990)
- Can't Buy Your Way (1992)
- Wrong Highway Blues (1994)

Recorded under Red House Records

- Living in the City (1996)

Recorded under Prime CD Records

- Three August Nights (2000)
- Another Sleepless Night (2001)

Recorded under Fifty Fifty Music Music

- New Moon (2005)
- One Day (2008)

== Band lineups ==
Northern Lights lineups
1975–1977	Dan Marcus - banjo, guitar, vocals; Richard Hand - banjo, guitar; Marty Sachs - bass, vocals; Bob Emery - guitar, vocals; Taylor Armerding - vocals, mandolin
1977	Richard Hand - banjo, guitar; Marty Sachs - bass, vocals; Bob Emery - guitar, vocals; Taylor Armerding - vocals, mandolin
1977–1982	Band on hiatus
1982–1984	Alison Brown - banjo; Bill Henry - guitar, vocals; Bob Emery - bass, vocals; Taylor Armerding - vocals, mandolin
1984–1987	Mike Kropp - banjo, guitar; Bill Henry - guitar, vocals; Bob Emery - bass, vocals; Taylor Armerding - vocals, mandolin
1987–1990	Mike Kropp - banjo, guitar; Bill Henry - vocals, guitar; Oz Barron - bass, vocals; Taylor Armerding - vocals, mandolin
1990–1992	Mike Kropp - banjo, guitar; Bill Henry - vocals, guitar; Jeff Horton - bass, vocals; Taylor Armerding - vocals, mandolin
1992–1996	Mike Kropp - banjo, guitar; Bill Henry - vocals, guitar; Taylor Armerding - vocals, mandolin; Jeff Horton - bass, vocals; Jake Armerding - violin, vocals
1996–1999	Bill Henry - vocals, guitar; Taylor Armerding - vocals, mandolin; Mike Kropp - banjo, guitar; Chris Miles - bass, vocals; Jake Armerding - violin, mandolin vocals
1999–2000	Bill Henry - vocals, guitar; Taylor Armerding - vocals, mandolin; Mike Kropp - banjo, guitar; Chris Miles - bass, vocals
2000–2002	Bill Henry - vocals, guitar; Taylor Armerding - vocals, mandolin; Dave Dick - banjo, mandolin, vocals; Chris Miles - bass, vocals
2003–2006	Bill Henry - vocals, guitar; Ben Demerath - guitar, mandolin, vocals; Dave Dick - mandolin, banjo, vocals; John Daniel - bass, vocals
2006–2008	Bill Henry - vocals, guitar; Mike Barnett - violin; John Daniel - bass, vocals; Joe Walsh - mandolin, vocals; Ben Demerath - guitar, vocals
2008–2010	Bill Henry-vocals, guitar; Mike Barnett violin; John Daniel- bass, vocals; Alex MacLeod guitar, vocals; Eric Robertson mandolin, vocals
