= Over Soul (song) =

2001 single by Megumi Hayashibara

- Standard edition cover

Single by Megumi Hayashibara

from the album Feel Well
- Language: Japanese
- B-side: "Trust You"
- Released: August 29, 2001
- Genre: J-pop; anime song
- Length: 3:54
- Label: Starchild
- Composer: Go Takahashi
- Lyricist: Megumi
- Producers: Takashi Tokuhara; Koji Asano

Megumi Hayashibara singles chronology
"Unsteady" (2000)	"Over Soul" (2001)	"Feel Well" (2001)

Alternative cover
- Limited edition cover

Audio
- "Over Soul" on YouTube

"Over Soul" is a song by Japanese voice actress and recording artist Megumi Hayashibara. Written by Go Takahashi with lyrics penned by Hayashibara, (Note: Under the alias "Megumi" stylized in all caps.) the song was released as a single on August 29, 2001, via Starchild. The song was used as the opening theme for the anime television series Shaman King, which aired from July 2001 to September 2002 in Japan.

== Background and release ==
"Over Soul" was used as the opening theme for TV adaptation of Shaman King, where Hayashibara also voices the series' main heroine, Anna Kyoyama. The song has been described as a bright, upbeat tempo song which exemplifies the classic style of early 2000s anime songs. Its lyrics are closely tied to the series' narrative, reflecting the protagonist Yoh Asakura's persistent, never-give-up spirit and his refusal to abandon his goals. Hayashibara deliberately wanted to project the image of Anna with the song, and wore clothes similar to Anna's when promoting or performing it. The B-side of the single, "Trust You", served as ending theme for the same series.

The CD single was released in two versions: standard and limited edition, with the latter featuring Anna Kyoyama on the cover. This edition also included a promotional card.

== Commercial performance ==
"Over Soul" debuted and peaked at number 7 on the Oricon charts, selling 60,930 copies on its first week. The single charted for eight weeks in total, with reported sales amounting to 110,570 copies.

The single was certified Gold by the Recording Industry Association of Japan (RIAJ) in 2003.

== Impact and legacy ==
The song has been recognized as one of the most popular tracks from the Shaman King franchise. In 2021, upon the announcement of the revival of the Shaman King animated series, King Amusement Creative uploaded the official opening sequence featuring the song, where it quickly accumulated over 2.7 million views. When writing the song "Soul Salvation" for the Shaman King 2021 revival anime, Hayashibara admittedly struggled with the idea of surpassing "Over Soul" in terms of achieving its level of popularity and positive fan reception. On the fifth episode of the 2021 series, "Over Soul!" which aired on July 29, 2021, the song was used as an insert song for the first time in approximately 20 years.

== Cover versions ==
In 2022, the song was covered by voice actress Yoko Hikasa as part of the CrosSing cover song project—which features popular voice actors covering anime songs. Hikasa, who voices Yoh Asakura in the 2021 Shaman King adaptation, selected the song due to her closeness with the series, having watched it since 20 years prior.

== Track listing ==
All lyrics are written by Megumi; all music is composed by Go Takahashi.

CD single/digital release track listing
No.	Title	Length
1.	"Over Soul"	3:54
2.	"Trust You"	3:27
3.	"Over Soul" (Instrumental)	3:53
4.	"Trust You" (Instrumental)	3:26

== Personnel ==
Credits adapted from the liner notes of the CD single.

- Megumi Hayashibara – vocals
- Go Takahashi – arrangements
- Keiji Kondoh – mixing
- Hiroyuki Tsuji – mixing
- Akira Ando – mastering
- Takashi Tokuhara – producer
- Koji Asano – producer
- Toshimichi Otsuki – executive producer

== Charts ==
=== Weekly charts ===
Weekly chart performance for "Over Soul"
Chart (2001)	Peak position
Japan (Oricon)	7

Chart (2020)	Peak position
Japan Download Songs (Billboard Japan)	29
Japan Hot Animation (Billboard Japan)	16

=== Year-end charts ===
Year-end chart performance for "Over Soul"
Chart (2001)	Position
Japan (Oricon)	164

== Certifications ==
Region	Certification	Certified units/sales
Japan (RIAJ)	Gold	100,000^{^}
^{^} Shipments figures based on certification alone.
