= Saber Marionette J Again =

Japanese OVA (original video animation)

またまたセイバーマリオネットJ (Mata Mata Seibā Marionetto Jei)
- Genre: Romantic comedy; Science fiction
- Original video animation
- Directed by: Masami Shimoda
- Produced by: Shinjirou Yokoyama; Katsunori Haruta; Atsushi Sugita
- Written by: Mayori Sekijima
- Music by: Parome
- Studio: Hal Film Maker
- Released: November 25, 1997 – June 25, 1998
- Runtime: 26–29 minutes
- Episodes: 6

Saber Marionette J Again (またまたセイバーマリオネットJ, Mata Mata Seibā Marionetto Jei), also known as Saber Marionette J: Plasmastic Crisis or Saber Marionette J+, is the 1997 sequel to the 1996 Japanese anime series Saber Marionette J. It is a six episode OVA which continues the story of its predecessor, following the eventful life of Otaru Mamiya and his three marionettes Lime, Cherry and Bloodberry.

== Plot ==
The war with Gartland has officially ended, and Terra II has returned to a state of serenity. Otaru and his marionettes have reunited under the same roof and are living a relaxed, uninterrupted life. Penitent for mistreating his Saber Dolls during his reign, Gelhardt von Faust requests through a letter that he would like Tiger, Panther and Luchs to live with Otaru to improve their etiquette and culinary skills. Initially the idea is a controversial one, but they all learn to accept each other as companions and settle in a coexistence.

The following day an unidentified thief, locally nicknamed "The Whirlwind Bandit", is found to be responsible for multiple thefts around the Japoness area. This stealthy kleptomaniac turns out to be a marionette by the name, or model number, NSM-X1. Following a brief confrontation with her, Lime's benevolence uplifts the marionette and her personality changes to a more friendly, obsequious one. This convinces Lime that she has a good heart. Her introduction to the group begins roughly, but having returned stolen property and feeling remorse, she is befriended, unanimously being given the name "Marine".

Marine acclimates with her new lifestyle, but suddenly develops androphobia. Concerned about her unusual fear, the group take Marine to Lorelei who diagnoses her behavior as the effects of puberty. This has an inscrutable effect on Lime, who soon begins to exhibit a similar uneasiness around Otaru. Later in the day, things only intensify as Otaru accidentally trips into Lime and incidentally kisses her in the process. Marine goes on a rampage from seeing this and shockingly generates a plasma storm. Otaru rushes to tackle Marine to protect her from under a lightning strike and it is this courage that leads her to appreciate him.

Throughout the day Marine's proficient ability to multitask (chop the wood, set up the restaurant) irritates Lime, who is criticized for being lazy. In an attempt to show Marine up in front of Luchs, Lime attends a trip to dig up edible bamboo shoots. During their stay in the fields, they encounter a polymorphic cyborg hell-bent on killing Marine. Lime and the other marionettes combat the cyborg, but their efforts are fruitless. Enraged at the creature, Marine incinerates it with plasma energy, overheating herself. The marionettes are brought to castle Japoness for recovery and it is there that Lorelei finds three maiden circuits within Marine. Just as the discovery is made, multiple cyborgs infiltrate the establishment.

Outnumbered, Otaru, along with Lorelei, are taken hostage with Marine as the ransom. Lime and the others refuse to hand her over, and instead decide to fight back. Their efforts work, but with a midnight payment deadline, they rush to save Otaru and Lorelei. They are late, and the remaining cyborgs assimilate to form a hideous flower-like monstrosity which lassos the marionettes. Faust angrily attempts to kill it himself, but is caught off-guard and beaten. He screams in pain and this immediately awakens a now infuriated Tiger who roars to the top blasting the monster off of Faust. With Marine's help, the two manage to kill it. Just as things begin to settle down, the entire planet of Terra II begins to split and a powerful plasma storm is generated.

Otaru attends a meeting at the castle to discuss a disastrous future event. Faust reveals that every 80,000 years a catastrophic plasma storm develops with strength enough to destroy the planet. Additionally, Otaru learns that Marine is a prototypical saber marionette, developed by New Texas to have a tolerance to plasma and utilize it as a weapon. However, because of overlooked design flaws, these features greatly overpower her and death is certain if she continues to mature. Otaru realizes what that means and refuses to sacrifice her to save the planet. Unbeknown to them, Marine eavesdropped on the conversation and now understands, and wishes to fulfill, her existence. Lime is particularly against this and rushes off to save her friend in the newly developed plasma-defusing experimental vessel. Despite incredible speed and strength, she fails to arrive in time; Marine has already absorbed most of the energy and is ready to defuse it herself. This proves to be gravely damaging, with Lime being the only conscious survivor of the two. Marine is taken to the castle for recovery and repairs; Lorelei promises to fix her. The group departs from their visit but not before Lime leans a conch shell next to Marine's ear, reiterating their promise of one day, visiting the sea together.

== Cast ==
Saber Marionette J Again cast
Role	Japanese	English
Role	Japanese	Animaze
Otaru Mamiya	Yuka Imai	Mona Marshall
Lime	Megumi Hayashibara	Julie Maddalena
Cherry	Yuri Shiratori	Bridget Hoffman
Bloodberry	Akiko Hiramatsu	Mary Elizabeth McGlynn
Marine	Maya Okamoto	Lia Sargent
Mitsurugi Hanata	Takehito Koyasu	R. Martin Klein
Gerhard von Faust	Hikaru Midorikawa	Jamieson Price
Luchs	Yuuko Mizutani	Wendee Lee
Panther	Emi Shinohara	Carol Stanzione
Tiger	Urara Takano	Diane Michelle
Tamasaburou	Maria Kawamura	Jane Sanford
Baikou	Ai Orikasa	Riva Spier
Lorelei	Yuri Amano	Emily Brown
President Joy Hewlick	Hiroyuki Oshida	Steve McGowan
Minister of Defense	Tomohiro Nishimura	Christopher Carroll
Newspaper Seller		Steve Apostolina
Gennai Shiraga	Chō	Doug Stone
Yang Min	Nobuo Tobita	Richard Miro
Echigoya	Ken'ichi Suzumura	
Uomasa	Katsuya Shiga	Christopher Carroll
Yumeji Hanagata	Urara Takano	Dorothy Elias-Fahn
Dr. Hesse	Tomohiro Nishimura	Richard Miro
Scientist		Michael Forest
Kashio		Steve Kramer

== Music ==
- Episode 1 Opening: "Sakaseruze! Dokyo-bana" (Performed by Yuka Imai)
- Episode 1 Ending / 2 - 6 Opening: "Hesitation" (Performed by Megumi Hayashibara)
- Episode 2 Ending: "Mamotte Ageru" (Performed by Akiko Hiramatsu)
- Episode 3 Ending: "Heart Break Down" (Performed by Yuri Shiratori)
- Episode 4 Ending: "Kage Ni Nare" (Performed by Ai Orikasa)
- Episode 5 Ending: "Kazeno Uta Wo Kikinagara" (Performed by Rei Kanemaki)
- Episode 6 Ending: "I'll be there (Ballad Version)" (Performed by Megumi Hayashibara)

== Episode list ==
1. Everyone's Happy (November 25, 1997)
2. The Beautiful Marin Blue (December 18, 1997)
3. Suddenly, a Love Comedy (January 25, 1998)
4. The Silent Assassin (February 25, 1998)
5. Time of the Heart's Awakening (May 25, 1998)
6. Return to the Sea (June 25, 1998)

== See also ==
- Saber Marionette J
- Saber Marionette J to X
