= Saber Marionette =

Comedy manga, anime, light novel, and audio drama franchise with android girls

- Collage of characters from the three Saber Marionette series.

セイバーマリオネット (Seibā Marionetto)
- Original video animation

Saber Marionette R
- Directed by: Koji Masunari
- Produced by: Atsushi Sugita; Mitsuteru Shibata
- Written by: Masaharu Amiya; Sumio Uetake
- Music by: Toshiyuki Omori
- Studio: Zero-G Room; Animate Film
- Released: May 25, 1995 – September 25, 1995
- Runtime: 30 minutes
- Episodes: 3
- Anime
- Saber Marionette J (1996–97 television series); Saber Marionette J Again (1997–98 OVA series); Saber Marionette J to X (1998–99 television series)
- Other media
- Saber Marionette R (1995 audio dramas); Saber Marionette i − Neo Gene (2008 manga); Saber Marionette Z (1995 manga)

Saber Marionette (セイバーマリオネット, Seibā Marionetto) is a Japanese series created by Satoru Akahori featuring android girls. It has been produced in the form of anime, manga, and light novels.

In January 1995, a twelve-episode audio drama series called SM Girls Saber Marionette R aired on the radio show Nowanchatte Say You. The audio drama concluded in April 1995, and the story was continued one month later with the release of the first episode of the Saber Marionette R OVA. Episode two was released in late July 1995, and in September 1995, the final episode was released.

From April, 1995 to December 1995, an incomplete seven-chapter manga titled SM Girls Gaiden Saber Marionette Z was published in Gakken's magazine AnimeV, in its Vcomi section. It was illustrated by Megumu Okada and was never published in a tankōbon format. The eighth chapter was released in a novel format. Later, Akahori and Katsumi Hasegawa attempted to re-compose the story as a Saber Marionette R 2 novel, but it was never realized and was released as another novel.

In October 1995 the SM Girls Saber Marionette J audio drama series premiered on Nowanchatte Say You and ran until January 1996. In October 1996 the Saber Marionette J anime series aired. The series ran through March 1997 with 25 episodes. Beginning with a short story published in the October 1994 issue of Gekkan Dragon Magazine, twelve volumes of serialized light novels were produced. A manga series illustrated by Yumisuke Kotoyoshi was adapted from an anime series serialized in the Gekkan Dragon Jr. and then Gekkan Comic Dragon.

In October 1997, a sequel arrived on video, the Saber Marionette J Again OVA. In June 1998, the sixth and final episodes of the OVA were released. In October 1998, the Saber Marionette J to X TV series was first broadcast. The series ran for 26 episodes, concluding in March 1999.

A manga titled Saber Marionette 2: Shiritsu Oedo Gakuen Koubouki started serializing in Fujimi Shobo's Gekkan Dragon Magazine in October 2000, but it was soon canceled.

A manga titled Saber Marionette i − Neo Gene illustrated by Megane Ōtomo started its serialization in July 2008 in Fujimi Shobo's Gekkan Dragon Age and was finally compiled in one tankōbon.

In July 2015, the group then known as Animation Innovation Content (AIC) Project (currently: Saber Project) announced that it had licensed the rights to the franchise, and simultaneously announced the launch of the Saber "re:anime project".

== Timeline ==
- Arrival of the colony ship Mesopotamia at the planet Terra 2
- 300 years after arrival
  - Saber Marionette J
    - Saber Marionette J Again
      - Saber Marionette J to X
- 500 years after arrival
  - SM Girls Saber Marionette R audio drama
    - Saber Marionette R (OVA)
  - Saber Marionette i − Neo Gene (manga)
- 800 years after arrival
  - Saber Marionette Z (manga)

== Saber Marionette J ==
Saber Marionette J (セイバーマリオネットJ, Seiba Marionetto Jei) is about Mamiya Otaru and his three marionettes, humanoid female robots; the young and free-spirited Lime; the small and reserved Cherry; and the outgoing and busty Bloodberry.

In a world with no women, the surviving men have reintroduced the female in the form of an android. Called Marionettes, they are built to serve men and are limited in their interactions with humans. That is until a poor boy named Otaru Mamiya encounters a Marionette named Lime. Lime is a Saber model with a special circuit that gives her emotions. When Otaru awakens two more Saber Marionettes, his life as an 'average' boy quickly becomes as extraordinary as the lives of his eager, busty new friends.

== Saber Marionette J Again ==
Saber Marionette J Again is a 6-episode OVA that has events which take place after Saber Marionette J. In the story, Faust asks Otaru to receive the three Saber Dolls in his apartment, so that he can educate them as he did with Lime, Cherry, and Bloodberry. At the same time, Lorelei is asked to repair Tiger's maiden circuit, which is broken.

Meanwhile, planet Terra II is beginning to experience a plasmatic crisis. The key to save the planet lies within a new marionette, which will bear the name Marine. The mystery behind Marine lies in her triple maiden circuit, and is not unveiled until episode four. She matures faster than the other marionettes, and is stronger than Bloodberry and Panther combined.

== Saber Marionette J to X ==
Saber Marionette J to X continues approximately a year after the conclusion of Saber Marionette J. In the early episodes Otaru, Lime, Bloodberry and Cherry are shown leading comparatively ordinary lifestyles, cherishing the peaceful days that dawn on Japoness.

As the story progresses, due to uncanny circumstances, Faust appears once again, much more zealous, brutal and merciless than before, restarting his world-conquering agenda. He is accompanied by his subordinates, the Saber dolls. He is revealed to be a clone of the now introspective, atonement-seeking Faust, the embodiment of a measure taken by Gartland to secure the aspirations of Faust the First.

Later on, as Japoness stirs, more, and even much more sinister and ulterior motives are revealed, and the joint efforts, and investigations lead to the conclusion that Yan of Xian and Dr. Hesse, the former scientist and servant of Faust both have a hand in the matter.

They successfully kidnap the Marionettes and make them lose their memories for a prolonged period, which they use for their own gains later on. The series concerns itself with the return of the Marionettes' memories extensively.

Yan and particularly Hesse are shown in-depth only at the end, showing their personal goals and past traumas in the last arc which resolves the man-machine conflict, with themes of technology and human responsibility.

== Saber Marionette R ==
Saber Marionette R takes place many years after the events in J. This series features three new marionettes that have the same names and basic personalities as those from the "J" and "J to X" series, but with different appearances (this series' Lime looks more like a child and has shorter hair, for example).

Saber Marionette R takes place in the city-state of Romana, which resembles medieval Italy. The three marionettes, Cherry, Lime and Bloodberry, now accompany Junior, the heir to the throne of Romana. However, a criminal known as Face is freed from prison by three marionettes of his own called the Sexadolls, named Edge, Brid and Canny. Face threatens the future of Romana by killing the king and forcing everyone to search for Junior and arrest him. Cherry, Lime and Bloodberry must destroy Face's Sexadolls, protect Junior and help Romana become peaceful once more.

Saber Marionette R cast
Role	Japanese	English
Role	Japanese	Ocean Productions
Lime	Megumi Hayashibara	Maggie Blue O'Hara
Cherry	Yuri Shiratori	Erin Fitzgerald
Junior	Yuka Imai	Matt Smith
Bloodberry	Akiko Hiramatsu	Janyse Jaud
Brid	Kikuko Inoue	Nicole Oliver
Edge	Urara Takano	Saffron Henderson
Canny	Yūko Mizutani	Venus Terzo
Star Face	Hikaru Midorikawa	Brian Drummond
Virey	Banjō Ginga	French Tickner
Lun	Yūko Miyamura	Nicole Oliver
Sunchest	Shin-ichiro Miki	John Payne
Patrol Saber	Miyuki Matsushita	Janyse Jaud
Announcer	Wataru Takagi	John Payne
Old Man	Ken'ichi Ogata	Don Brown
Adaly	Yūko Miyamura	Venus Terzo
Bureaucrat	Yasunori Matsumoto	John Payne
Sexadoll (1)	Kujira	Brian Drummond
Sexadoll (2)	Tomoko Naka	Nicole Oliver
