= Akiyuki Shinbo filmography =

The following is a list of works by Japanese anime director, storyboard artist, writer, and animator Akiyuki Shinbo. The page is divided into sections for his work as a series/film director, his involvement with other productions in a smaller role (i.e. key animator), and his books. These sections are further divided by format: television series, original video animations, original net animations, and films.

For some of his works, Shinbo has used various pseudonyms, not all of which are likely known. The current list of known Shinbo pseudonyms is as follows: Jūhachi Minamizawa, Futoshi Shiiya, Sōji Homura, and Satoko Shindō. Much of his work also tends to be completely uncredited, in particular for storyboarding and episode directing duties that he performs on his own series. For these reasons, the full extent of Shinbo's work across the industry, and even his own works, is not known.

== Works ==
In "Director(s)" column highlights Miyamoto's directorial works.

=== Television series ===
Year	Title	Director(s) (Note: For Chief Director (総監督), Director (監督) and Director's Assistant (監督補佐) credits.)	Series director(s) (Note: For Series Director (シリーズディレクター), Chief Director (チーフディレクター), Assistant Director (副監督), Chief Episode Director (チーフ演出), and Director (ディレクター) credits.)	Studio	Credits	Ref(s)
1983	Serendipity the Pink Dragon	—N/a	Nobuo Oonuki (chief)	Zuiyo	In-between animator (uncredited)	
1983	Igano Kabamaru	—N/a	Tameo Kohanawa (chief)	Group TAC	In-between animator (uncredited)	
1985	Dirty Pair	Toshifumi Takizawa; Norio Kashima	—N/a	Nippon Sunrise	Key animator	
1985	GeGeGe no Kitarō 3rd Series	Osamu Kasai; Hiroki Shibata	—N/a	Toei Animation	Key animator	
1989	Oishinbo	Yoshio Takeuchi	—N/a	Shin-Ei Animation	Key animator	
1989	Blue Blink	Osamu Tezuka (chief)	—N/a	Tezuka Productions	Key animator	
1989	Magical Hat	Akira Shigino	—N/a	Pierrot	Key animator	
1990–1991	Musashi, the Samurai Lord	Akira Shigino	—N/a	Pierrot	Assistant episode director (uncredited); Episode director Animation director Storyboard artist	
1991–1992	Marude Dameo	Akira Shigino	—N/a	Pierrot	Episode director	
1992–1994	Yu Yu Hakusho	Noriyuki Abe	—N/a	Pierrot	Episode director Storyboard artist Opening director and storyboard artist	
1994	Montana Jones	Tetsuo Imazawa	—N/a	Pierrot	Episode director	
1994	Metal Fighter Miku	Akiyuki Shinbo	—N/a	J.C.Staff	Storyboard artist Episode director	
1995	Ninku	Noriyuki Abe	—N/a	Pierrot	Episode director	
1996	Midori no Makibaō	Noriyuki Abe	—N/a	Pierrot	Episode director	
1996	Saber Marionette J	Masami Shimoda	—N/a	Studio Junio	Title animation director Title storyboard artist Ending director Supervisor (#2)	
1996	The Legend of Zorro	Katsumi Minoguchi	—N/a	Ashi Productions	Episode director Storyboard artist	
1998	Saber Marionette J to X	Masami Shimoda	—N/a	Hal Film Maker	Storyboard artist	
1999	Starship Girl Yamamoto Yohko	Akiyuki Shinbo	Shuuichi Kaneko (assistant)	J.C.Staff; T-Up	Storyboard artist	
2001	The SoulTaker	Akiyuki Shinbo	—N/a	Tatsunoko Production; Tatsunoko VCR	Storyboard artist Episode director (uncredited)	
2004	Magical Girl Lyrical Nanoha	Akiyuki Shinbo	—N/a	Seven Arcs		
2004	Tsukuyomi: Moon Phase	Akiyuki Shinbo (chief)	Toshimasa Suzuki (assistant)	Shaft	Storyboard artist (uncredited)	
2005	Paniponi Dash!	Akiyuki Shinbo	Shin Oonuma (series)	Shaft		
2006–2007	Negima!?	Akiyuki Shinbo	Shin Oonuma (chief)	Shaft		
2007	Sayonara, Zetsubou-Sensei	Akiyuki Shinbo	Naoyuki Tatsuwa (assistant)	Shaft		
2007	Hidamari Sketch	Akiyuki Shinbo (chief)	Ryouki Kamitsubo (chief)	Shaft	Storyboard artist	
2007	Hidamari Sketch Specials	Akiyuki Shinbo (chief)	Masayuki Iimura (#1)	Shaft	Storyboard artist	
2007	Ef: A Tale of Memories	Shin Oonuma	—N/a	Shaft	Supervisor; Storyboard artist	
2008	(Zoku) Sayonara, Zetsubou-Sensei	Akiyuki Shinbo	Naoyuki Tatsuwa (assistant); Yukihiro Miyamoto (chief episode)	Shaft		
2008	Hidamari Sketch x 365	Akiyuki Shinbo	—N/a	Shaft	Storyboard artist	
2008	Hidamari Sketch x 365 Specials	Akiyuki Shinbo	—N/a	Shaft		
2008	Ef: A Tale of Melodies	Shin Oonuma	—N/a	Shaft	Supervisor	
2009	Natsu no Arashi!	Akiyuki Shinbo	Shin Oonuma (series)	Shaft		
2009	Maria Holic	Akiyuki Shinbo	Naoyuki Tatsuwa (assistant); Yukihiro Miyamoto (series)	Shaft		
2009	(Zan) Sayonara, Zetsubou-Sensei	Akiyuki Shinbo	Naoyuki Tatsuwa (assistant); Yukihiro Miyamoto (chief episode)	Shaft	Series composition	
2009	Natsu no Arashi! Akinai-chū	Akiyuki Shinbo	Shin Oonuma (series); Kenichi Ishikura (series)	Shaft		
2009–2010	Bakemonogatari	Akiyuki Shinbo	Tatsuya Oishi (series)	Shaft	Series composition	
2010	Hidamari Sketch × Hoshimittsu	Akiyuki Shinbo	Kenichi Ishikura (series)	Shaft	Storyboard artist	
2010	Hidamari Sketch x Hoshimittsu Specials	Akiyuki Shinbo	Kenichi Ishikura (series)	Shaft		
2010	Dance in the Vampire Bund	Akiyuki Shinbo	Masahiro Sonoda (series)	Shaft		
2010	Arakawa Under the Bridge	Akiyuki Shinbo	Yukihiro Miyamoto (series)	Shaft		
2010	Arakawa Under the Bridge x Bridge	Akiyuki Shinbo	Yukihiro Miyamoto (series)	Shaft		
2010	And Yet the Town Moves	Akiyuki Shinbo	Naoyuki Tatsuwa (assistant)	Shaft		
2011	Puella Magi Madoka Magica	Akiyuki Shinbo	Yukihiro Miyamoto (series)	Shaft	Original creator (Magica Quartet)	
2011	Ground Control to Psychoelectric Girl	Akiyuki Shinbo (chief)	Yukihiro Miyamoto (series)	Shaft	Storyboard artist (uncredited)	
2011	Maria Holic Alive	Akiyuki Shinbo (chief)	Tomokazu Tokoro (series); Kenichi Ishikura (assistant)	Shaft		
2011	Hidamari Sketch x SP	Akiyuki Shinbo	—N/a	Shaft	Storyboard artist	
2011	Astarotte's Toy	Fumitoshi Oizaki	—N/a	Diomedéa	Series composition assistant	
2012	Hidamari Sketch x Honeycomb	Akiyuki Shinbo	Yuki Yase (series)	Shaft		
2012	Nisemonogatari	Akiyuki Shinbo	Tomoyuki Itamura (series)	Shaft	Series composition	
2012	Nekomonogatari: Black	Akiyuki Shinbo (chief); Tomoyuki Itamura	—N/a	Shaft	Composition	
2013	Sasami-san@Ganbaranai	Akiyuki Shinbo	Naoyuki Tatsuwa (assistant)	Shaft		
2013	Monogatari Series Second Season	Akiyuki Shinbo (chief); Tomoyuki Itamura	Naoyuki Tatsuwa (series); Yuki Yase (series)	Shaft	Composition	
2014	Nisekoi	Akiyuki Shinbo (chief); Naoyuki Tatsuwa	—N/a	Shaft	Series composition	
2014	Mekakucity Actors	Akiyuki Shinbo (chief); Yuki Yase	—N/a	Shaft		
2014	Hanamonogatari	Akiyuki Shinbo (chief); Tomoyuki Itamura	—N/a	Shaft	Composition	
2014	Tsukimonogatari	Akiyuki Shinbo (chief); Tomoyuki Itamura	—N/a	Shaft	Composition	
2015	Gourmet Girl Graffiti	Akiyuki Shinbo (chief); Naoyuki Tatsuwa	—N/a	Shaft		
2015	Nisekoi:	Akiyuki Shinbo (chief)	Yukihiro Miyamoto (chief episode)	Shaft	Series composition	
2015	Owarimonogatari I	Akiyuki Shinbo (chief); Tomoyuki Itamura	—N/a	Shaft	Series composition	
2016–2017	March Comes In like a Lion	Akiyuki Shinbo	Kenjirou Okada (series)	Shaft	Series composition	
2017	Owarimonogatari II	Akiyuki Shinbo (chief); Tomoyuki Itamura	—N/a	Shaft	Series composition	
2017–2018	March Comes In like a Lion 2nd Season	Akiyuki Shinbo	Kenjirou Okada (series)	Shaft	Series composition	
2018	Fate/Extra Last Encore	Akiyuki Shinbo (chief)	Yukihiro Miyamoto (series)	Shaft		
2019	Zoku Owarimonogatari	Akiyuki Shinbo	—N/a	Shaft	Series composition	
2020	Magia Record: Puella Magi Madoka Magica Side Story	Doroinu (chief)	Yukihiro Miyamoto (assistant); Kenjirou Okada (director); Midori Yoshizawa (director)	Shaft	Animation supervisor Original creator (Magica Quartet)	
2021	Magia Record: Puella Magi Madoka Magica Side Story 2nd Season -Eve of Awakening-	Doroinu (chief); Yukihiro Miyamoto	Midori Yoshizawa (assistant)	Shaft	Animation supervisor Original creator (Magica Quartet)	
2021	Pretty Boy Detective Club	Akiyuki Shinbo (chief); Hajime Ootani	Kenjirou Okada (assistant)	Shaft	Series composition	
2022	Magia Record: Puella Magi Madoka Magica Side Story Final Season -Dawn of Light Dreams-	Doroinu (chief); Yukihiro Miyamoto	Midori Yoshizawa (assistant)	Shaft	Animation supervisor Original creator (Magica Quartet)	
2026	Monogatari Off & Monster Season: Karen Ogre	Akiyuki Shinbo (chief); Midori Yoshizawa	—N/a	Shaft	Series composition	

=== OVAs ===
Year	Title	Director(s)	Series director(s)	Studio	Credits	Ref(s)
1988	Crying Freeman	Daisuke Nishio	—N/a	Toei Animation	Key animator	
1989	Baoh	Hiroyuki Yokoyama	—N/a	Pierrot	Key animator	
1991	Urusei Yatsura OVA	Setsuko Shibuichi	—N/a	Madhouse; Watanabe Promotion	Key animator	
1992	Tokyo Babylon	Koichi Chigira	—N/a	Madhouse	Key animator	
1993	Eternal Filena	Yoshikata Nitta	—N/a	Pierrot	Episode director Animation director	
1995	Galaxy Fräulein Yuna	Yorifusa Yamaguchi	—N/a	J.C.Staff	Storyboard artist	
1995	Devil Hunter Yohko	Akiyuki Shinbo (#6)	—N/a	Madhouse	Storyboard artist	
1996	Starship Girl Yamamoto Yohko I	Akiyuki Shinbo	—N/a	J.C.Staff; T-Up	Storyboard artist	
1996	Debutante Detective Corps	Akiyuki Shinbo	—N/a	Daume		
1996–1997	New Hurricane Polymar	Akiyuki Shinbo	—N/a	Tatsunoko Production	Storyboard artist (uncredited); Episode director (uncredited)	
1996–1997	Galaxy Fräulein Yuna Returns	Akiyuki Shinbo	—N/a	J.C.Staff		
1997	Starship Girl Yamamoto Yohko II	Akiyuki Shinbo	—N/a	J.C.Staff; T-Up	Episode director	
1997	Twilight of the Dark Master	Akiyuki Shinbo	—N/a	Madhouse		
1997–1998	Detatoko Princess	Akiyuki Shinbo	—N/a	J.C.Staff; T-Up		
1998	Saber Marionette J Again	Masami Shimoda	—N/a	Hal Film Maker	Opening visual concept and storyboard artist	
1999	Tenamonya Voyagers	Akiyuki Shinbo	—N/a	Pierrot	Storyboard artist (uncredited); Episode director (uncredited)	
2002	Sibling Secret	Akyiyuki Shinbo	—N/a	AT-2 (Note: AT-2 was a hentai label pseudonym of studio Arcturus, a subsidiary of Seven Arcs.)		
2002	Blood Royale	Akiyuki Shinbo	—N/a	AT-2		
2002	Ichi the Killer: Episode 0	Shinji Ishihira	—N/a	AIC	Storyboard artist	
2002–2003	Nurse Me!	Akiyuki Shinbo	—N/a	AT-2		
2003	Temptation	Akiyuki Shinbo	—N/a	AT-2		
2003	Triangle Heart ~Sweet Songs Forever~	Akiyuki Shinbo	—N/a	Seven Arcs		
2003–2004	Swallowtail Inn	Akiyuki Shinbo	—N/a	AT-2		
2004	Le Portrait de Petit Cossette	Akiyuki Shinbo	—N/a	Daume	Storyboard artist (uncredited); Episode director (uncredited)	
2006	Mahō Sensei Negima!: Spring (Haru)	Akiyuki Shinbo	Shin Oonuma (series)	Shaft	Storyboard artist (uncredited)	
2006	Mahō Sensei Negima!: Summer (Natsu)	Akiyuki Shinbo	Shin Oonuma (series)	Shaft		
2006	Tsukuyomi: Moon Phase	Akiyuki Shinbo	Toshimasa Suzuki (assistant)	Shaft		
2008	Shina Dark	Naoyuki Konno; Shinpei Tomooka; Shin Oonuma; Toshimasa Suzuki	—N/a	Shaft	Supervisor	
2008–2009	Mahou Sensei Negima! ~Shiroki Tsubasa Ala Alba~	Akiyuki Shinbo (chief); Hiroaki Tomita; Yukihiro Miyamoto; Tomoyuki Itamura	—N/a	Shaft; Studio Pastoral		
2008–2009	Goku Sayonara Zetsubou Sensei	Akiyuki Shinbo	Naoyuki Tatsuwa (assistant); Yukihiro Miyamoto (chief episode)	Shaft	Series composition	
2009	Hidamari Sketch x 365 EX	Akiyuki Shinbo	—N/a	Shaft		
2009	Pani Poni Dash!	Akiyuki Shinbo	Shin Oonuma (series)	Shaft		
2009–2010	Zan Sayonara Zetsubou Sensei Bangaichi	Akiyuki Shinbo	Naoyuki Tatsuwa (assistant); Yukihiro Miyamoto (chief episode)	Shaft	Series composition	
2009–2010	Mahou Sensei Negima! ~Mou Hitotsu no Sekai~	Akiyuki Shinbo (chief); Kōbun Shizuno; Tomokazu Tokoro; Tatsufumi Itō	—N/a	Shaft; Studio Pastoral		
2011	Katte ni Kaizō	Akiyuki Shinbo (chief); Naoyuki Tatsuwa	—N/a	Shaft		
2011	Astarotte's Toy	Fumitoshi Oizaki	—N/a	Diomedéa	Series composition assistant	
2012	Sayonara, Zetsubou-Sensei Special	Akiyuki Shinbo	Naoyuki Tatsuwa (assistant)	Shaft	Composition	
2012	Ground Control to Psychoelectric Girl	Akiyuki Shinbo (chief)	Yukihiro Miyamoto (series)	Shaft		
2013	Hidamari Sketch: Sae & Hiro's Graduation Arc	Akiyuki Shinbo (chief); Yuki Yase	—N/a	Shaft		
2015	Puella Magi Madoka Magica: Concept Movie	Akiyuki Shinbo (chief)	—N/a	Shaft	Storyboard artist	
2016	Nisekoi:	Akiyuki Shinbo (chief)	Yukihiro Miyamoto (chief episode)	Shaft	Series composition	
2016–2017	Kubikiri Cycle: The Beheading Cycle & The Blue Savant	Akiyuki Shinbo (chief); Yuki Yase	—N/a	Shaft	Series composition	

=== ONAs ===
Year	Title	Director(s)	Series director(s)	Studio	Credits	Ref(s)
2012	Kid Icarus: Uprising - Palutena's Revolting Dinner	Akiyuki Shinbo	—N/a	Shaft		
2014	Okitegami Kyouko no Bibouroku x Monogatari	Yukihiro Miyamoto	—N/a	Shaft	Storyboard artist	
2016	Kakushigoto	Yukihiro Miyamoto	—N/a	Shaft	Storyboard artist	
2016	Koyomimonogatari	Akiyuki Shinbo (chief); Tomoyuki Itamura	—N/a	Shaft	Series composition	
2022	Bakemonogatari	Akiyuki Shinbo	—N/a	Shaft	Storyboard artist	
2024	Monogatari Series Off & Monster Season	Akiyuki Shinbo (chief); Midori Yoshizawa	—N/a	Shaft	Series composition Storyboard artist	

=== Films ===
Year	Title	Director(s)	Series director(s)	Studio	Credits	Ref(s)
1985	GoShogun: The Time Etranger	Kunihiko Yuyama	—N/a	Ashi Productions	Key animator (uncredited)	
1991	Urusei Yatsura: Always, My Darling	Katsuhisa Yamada	—N/a	Madhouse	Key animator	
1995	Ninku: The Movie	Noriyuki Abe	—N/a	Pierrot	Unit director	
2011	Mahou Sensei Negima! Anime Finale	Akiyuki Shinbo	Kenichi Ishikura (assistant)	Shaft; Studio Pastoral	Composition	
2012	Puella Magi Madoka Magica the Movie: Beginnings	Akiyuki Shinbo; Yukihiro Miyamoto	Hiroyuki Terao (assistant)	Shaft	Film composition Original creator (Magica Quartet)	
2012	Puella Magi Madoka Magica the Movie: Eternal	Akiyuki Shinbo; Yukihiro Miyamoto	Hiroyuki Terao (assistant)	Shaft	Film composition Original creator (Magica Quartet); Graveyard part storyboard artist (uncredited)	
2013	Puella Magi Madoka Magica the Movie: Rebellion	Akiyuki Shinbo; Yukihiro Miyamoto	Hiroyuki Terao (assistant)	Shaft	Original creator (Magica Quartet)	
2016	Kizumonogatari Part 1: Tekketsu	Akiyuki Shinbo (chief); Tatsuya Oishi	—N/a	Shaft	Screenplay composition	
2016	Kizumonogatari Part 2: Nekketsu	Akiyuki Shinbo (chief); Tatsuya Oishi	—N/a	Shaft	Screenplay composition	
2017	Kizumonogatari Part 3: Reiketsu	Akiyuki Shinbo (chief); Tatsuya Oishi	—N/a	Shaft	Screenplay composition	
2017	Fireworks	Akiyuki Shinbo (chief); Nobuyuki Takeuchi	Seimei Kidokoro (assistant)	Shaft		
2024	Kizumonogatari: Koyomi Vamp	Tatsuya Oishi	—N/a	Shaft	Planning assistance	
2026	Puella Magi Madoka Magica the Movie: Walpurgisnacht: Rising	Akiyuki Shinbo (chief); Yukihiro Miyamoto	—N/a	Shaft	Original creator (Magica Quartet)	

=== Music videos ===
Year	Title	Studio	Credits	Ref(s)
1995	MVP E.M.U: Shounen A to Z	J.C. Staff	Director	
2001	Triangle Heart: Lyrical Toy Box (Note: Triangle Hearts ~Sweet Songs Forever~ Sound Stage VA (とらいあんぐるハート〜Sweet Songs Forever〜 サウンドステージVA).)	Seven Arcs	Director	

=== Video games ===
Year	Title	Studio	Credits	Ref(s)
1995	Metal Fighter Miku	J.C.Staff	Opening storyboard artist Opening director Supervising director	
1996	Alice in Cyberland	J.C.Staff	Animation (cutscene) director	
2000	Tatsunoko Fight	Tatsunoko Production	Opening cinematics storyboard artist Opening cinematics unit director Lightning Volter opening cinematics director Lightning Volter opening cinematics storyboard artist	
2005	The God of Death	Remic	Opening animation storyboard artist	
2013	Fate/Extra CCC	Shaft	Opening cinematics director Opening cinematics storyboard artist	

== Book supervisor ==
Year	Title	Publisher	Release date	ISBN	Ref(s)
2012	Shinbogatari	Ichijinsha			
2019	Akiyuki Shimbo x Shaft Chronicle	Dotcom	November 23	978-4-83-545701-7	

== Notes ==
=== Works cited ===
- Shinbo, Akiyuki (2012). 新房語 [Shinbogatari] (in Japanese). Ichijinsha. ISBN 978-4758012591.
- Magica Quartet (2013). 劇場版 魔法少女まどか☆マギカ [前編]始まりの物語/[後編]永遠の物語 公式ガイドブック with you. [Puella Magi Madoka Magica The Movie [Part 1] Beginning / [Part 2] Eternal Official Guidebook with you.]. Houbunsha. ISBN 978-4832243323.
