= Saber Marionette J to X =

Japanese anime television series

- Saber Marionette J To X

セイバーマリオネットJ To X
- Anime television series
- Directed by: Kiyoko Sayama; Masami Shimoda
- Produced by: Noriko Kobayashi; Shinjirō Yokoyama
- Written by: Mayori Sekijima
- Music by: PAROME
- Studio: Hal Film Maker
- Licensed by: NA: Bandai Entertainment
- Original network: TXN (TV Tokyo)
- English network: SEA: Animax Asia
- Original run: October 6, 1998 – March 30, 1999
- Episodes: 26

Saber Marionette J to X (セイバーマリオネット J to X), also known as Saber Marionette X, is a 1998 Japanese anime television series, the last part of the Saber Marionette J series, and a sequel of Saber Marionette J Again. Like the previous ones, it was created by Satoru Akahori (赤堀悟, あかほりさとる). The 26 episode saga began airing in Japan on October 6, 1998 to March 30, 1999. It is licensed by Bandai Entertainment.

== Plot ==
After the events of Saber Marionette J Otaru and the girls continue to live routine lives, while Lorelei works on the cloning project to reintroduce human females into the population. The first few episodes revolve around the personal growth of the girls as individuals, and their interactions with the people around them. Faust's Saber Dolls still live in Japoness, although as they also continue to develop emotionally, begin to feel restless and desire to return to their master. When they receive an envelope from Faust containing nothing but a blank piece of paper, they take it as a sign that he wishes them to rejoin him. After saying a heartfelt farewell to the marionettes, they depart Japoness.

In contrast to the care-free lifestyle of the marionettes, Lorelei begins to feel stifled by her over-protected existence within the walls of Japoness Castle, and begs Otaru to help her escape for a day. Otaru and the marionettes manage to succeed in smuggling Lorelei out of the castle, but their act of goodwill backfires when she is kidnapped, apparently by former members of the Gartland regime. When Otaru attempts to free her, he is confronted by a power-mad Faust once again bent on conquest, accompanied by the Saber Dolls, who seem disturbed by Faust's return to his dark past. When another Faust appears, everyone soon realizes that the Faust responsible for the kidnapping is actually a clone being manipulated by Doctor Hess. While Otaru and the marionettes were preoccupied with Faust, Doctor Hess and a member of the Xian government had used the opportunity to scan Lorelei's brain for information, although they escape without revealing their true purpose.

The second half of the series takes place in Xian, where Otaru and the girls go on a holiday trip won through a lottery. At this time, Otaru's relationship with the girls becomes more complicated, as he experiences growing pressure from the girls to choose one of them to marry. Instead, he chooses to try to show affection to them equally, without singling any of them out. While the girls feel sorry for Otaru and appreciate his attempt to be considerate, they begin to feel that they are emotionally mature enough to handle the situation, whoever he might choose.

Upon reaching Xian, Otaru comes down with a serious fever called the "sleeping fever", which the marionettes are told can only be cured by a rare moss that grows in the mountains. In the process of looking for the moss, the girls become separated and are attacked by mysterious robot assailants, which turn out to be working for Doctor Hess and his Xian associate. This time, instead of Lorelei, it is the marionettes' brains they attempt to scan, but a security measure within the maiden circuits kicks in and creates feedback within Doctor Hess' machine, causing a tremendous explosion.

When Otaru wakes up five days later, he finds only Hanagata in his room; the marionettes never returned, although a bag belonging to Lime and containing the medicine that saved Otaru was somehow left on the table in his room. Otaru begins a desperate search for the girls, greatly hampered by the fact that he has been accused of causing the explosion in Doctor Hess's lab and branded a terrorist. He eventually discovers the whereabouts of the three girls: Lime is now working as a nurse, Cherry at a temple orphanage, and Bloodberry in the circus. Otaru manages to rescue the girls and restore their memories, but is severely hurt in the process. He begins to believe that their lives in Xian are much better than the one they shared with him in Japoness, and that if he can't decide among them, they would be better off without him. It is with this conclusion that he decides to return to Japoness alone.

The marionettes are crushed by Otaru's sudden, unannounced departure. Not knowing why he chose to abandon them, they begin to doubt their own value as people and whether or not they will be forever separated from humanity because of their machine bodies. Doctor Hess appears to them in a dream and promises them that he can make them human, if they are willing to give him what he wants in return. Lime, convinced that becoming human will finally allow her to fulfill her dream of marrying Otaru, goes to meet Hess, while Cherry and Bloodberry follow her to try to convince her that Hess cannot be trusted. Lime is shocked when Doctor Hess admits that he never had the intention of making her human, and that all he really wanted was to get the three girls together so that he could finish copying their data. It turns out that only the marionettes have the power to communicate with the Mesopotamia's computer systems, which he needs in order to gain access to the wormhole charts in its memory that will allow him to return to Earth on board his new ship, The Neo-Mesopotamia.

Hess reveals that he is over 400 years old, a feat he has achieved by turning himself into a cyborg, with all of his body except for his brain having been converted from flesh to metal. He was on Terra 2 a century before the Mesapotamia's arrival, part of an even earlier scouting mission called the Frontier Project, whose purpose was to find a habitable planet to ease Earth's pollution and over-population problems. He was the first to go down to the planet's surface, but only barely survived the landing due to Terra 2's violent plasma storms. His shipmates, unable to follow, were left with little choice but to return to Earth, swearing before they left that they would return to rescue him. He waited for years but nobody ever returned for him; as a result, he was forever separated from his family on Earth, who were left to believe that he had died in space. His rage and grief at his abandonment drove him to build a ship powerful enough to weather the plasma storms and return to Earth on his own, where he plans on exacting his revenge. Firmly believing that humanity as a whole is an irredeemable species, he feels no regret for the countless thousands of people on Terra 2 who have suffered as a result of his plans for revenge.

Having taken what he needs from the marionettes, he allows them to escape from his ship as he prepares for launch. However, the massive energies released by the Neo-Mesopotamia cause an earthquake that starts to rip apart the surface of Terra 2. The marionettes decide that they cannot allow Doctor Hess to get away, both for the sakes of the lives he has destroyed on Terra 2, and for the sakes of those on Earth who will die if he succeeds. They manage to re board the ship and confront Doctor Hess, only to discover that it does not matter if they defeat him: the Neo-Mesopotamia has been rigged with a massive nuclear device, capable of wiping out an entire planet. The undaunted marionettes continue to fight against Doctor Hess, but are interrupted as the ship leaves the wormhole's exit to the Solar System and are struck by the massive chunks of icy debris that make up the rings of Saturn. In the near distance, they see the derelict of another ship, which Doctor Hess is shocked to realize is all that remains of the original Frontier Project ship. Doctor Hess is overcome with the horrifying realization that all of his plans for revenge were based on a misunderstanding: instead of being abandoned as he had thought, it turns out he was the only survivor.

Realizing the tragedy of his existence, Doctor Hess gives up control of his ship. His body is finally giving out; wavering on the brink of death, Doctor Hess relents and thanks the marionettes for helping him to see the truth, then passes away. The girls return the ship to the wormhole, hoping to put as much distance as possible between themselves and Earth before the ship detonates. From Terra 2, the massive shock wave caused by the ship's destruction registers on the sensors in Faust's ship, and everyone realizes what the marionettes have done. The wormhole itself, destabilized by the explosion, begins to close, but not before three beams of light shoot out of it and streak towards Terra 2. In his last moments, Doctor Hess, realizing that he had doomed the marionettes to die with him, managed to transfer the essences of the marionettes into the memory of the ship, which were then broadcast back to Terra 2 when the ship was destroyed. Otaru, crushed by his failure to protect his marionettes, is discovered by Lorelei and Faust, who take him to a hidden cave where the first three female clones have finally awakened. The essences of the marionettes have been transferred into the three babies, and the marionettes fulfill their wish to become human.

Peace returns to Terra 2 and Otaru takes the girls as his daughters, determined to use his second chance with the girls to finally return the love and happiness they had given him. Hanagata goes on to write a novel about Otaru and the girls' adventures; the Saber Dolls find jobs to help Faust fund research into the mysteries of Terra 2, so that mankind may some day truly make the planet their own. Panther becomes Hanagata's editor; Luchs, a television lifestyle reporter; and Tiger goes in search of supplies to help Faust in his work. When we last see Otaru and the girls, we see a determined father who will stop at nothing to protect and care for his girls. For the girls' part, they are now normal human girls with no recollection of their past, although there are some signs that perhaps their plans for Otaru have not been changed by their death and rebirth, but merely postponed (and this couldn't be better illustrated than by the now human child Cherry yet harbouring romantic reveries regarding Otaru).

== Information ==
There is a clear shift from the overall lighter-on-the-viewer disposition of Saber Marionette J Again to more deeply drama-oriented narrative. The series sticks with the distinct art style, although with a little more intensive coloring compared to the first TV series.

There also seems to be some episodes of a different series overlapping within this series as Faust is still researching the Plasma event that appears in Saber Marionette J Again, leading some to believe these two Saber Marionette J sequels may have originally been alternate endings.

== Cast ==
Saber Marionette J to X major cast
Role	Japanese	English	
Role	Japanese	Blue Water Studios	
Otaru Mamiya	Yuka Imai	Jonathan Love	Jonathan Love
Lime	Megumi Hayashibara	Mariette Sluyter	Mariette Sluyter
Cherry	Yuri Shiratori	Kendra Masonchuck	Kendra Masonchuck
Bloodberry	Akiko Hiramatsu	Marianna Jaromi	Marianna Jaromi
Mitsurugi Hanagata	Takehito Koyasu	Bryce Kulak	Bryce Kulak
Lorelei	Yuri Amano	Mariette Sluyter	Mariette Sluyter
Yang Min	Nobuo Tobita	5	Dave Pettitt
Yang Min	Nobuo Tobita	6-26	Shekhar Paleja
Gerhard von Faust	Hikaru Midorikawa	Byron Close	Byron Close
Tiger	Urara Takano	Elizabeth Stepkowski	Elizabeth Stepkowski
Luchs	Yuuko Mizutani	Melanie Risdon	Melanie Risdon
Panther	Kikuko Inoue	Michelle Armeneau	Michelle Armeneau
Dr. Hesse	Tomohiro Nishimura	Dave Pettitt	Dave Pettitt
Baikou	Ai Orikasa	Marianna Jaromi	Marianna Jaromi
Tamasaburou	Maria Kawamura	Macy Brown	Macy Brown
Gennai Shiraga	Chō	Dave Kelly Paul Boucher	Dave Kelly Paul Boucher
Yumeji Hanagata	Urara Takano	Andi Zack-Johnson	Andi Zack-Johnson
Akashi Shirase	Kappei Yamaguchi	Dan Gascon	Dan Gascon
Osaka	Katsuya Shiga	Bryce Kulak Tommy Campbell	Bryce Kulak Tommy Campbell
Pierrot the Clown	Hiroyuki Yoshino	Dave Kelly Dave Pettitt	Dave Kelly Dave Pettitt
Ringmaster	Hiroyuki Oshida	Dan Gascon Dave Pettitt	Dan Gascon Dave Pettitt
Brother Shounen		Shekhar Paleja	Shekhar Paleja
General Chao	Shouzou Iizuka	Dave Pettitt	Dave Pettitt
Doctor Zhou		Dave Kelly	Dave Kelly

Almost all of the characters from the previous series make an appearance, and a great deal of supporting characters are introduced. Marine does not make an appearance. Marine is, however, briefly and indirectly mentioned by Hanagata during the intro of episode 4 as one of the only seven marionettes on Terra 2 to possess a maiden circuit.

== Episode list ==
PHASE 01: Civilization All Over the Place (October 6, 1998)
PHASE 02: Wishes Are Granted to the Winner of the Float Battle (October 13, 1998)
PHASE 03: Daddy is Coming! Daddy is Coming! (October 20, 1998)
PHASE 04: The Saberdolls' Journey (October 27, 1998)
PHASE 05: Shirataki Shines Forever (November 3, 1998)
PHASE 06: Two Otaru's? The Tightrope of Love (November 10, 1998)
PHASE 07: The Lonely Fairy (November 17, 1998)
PHASE 08: Cherry's Babysitting Diary (November 24, 1998)
PHASE 09: The Forest, An Iron Ball, and Everybody (December 1, 1998)
PHASE 10: Onigiri Tastes Like Peace?! (December 8, 1998
PHASE 11: Redemption of Otaru the Man (December 15, 1998)
PHASE 12: The Heaven's Cross of Fate (December 22, 1998)
PHASE 13: Evil Ambitions and the Rise of the Iron Beast (January 5, 1999)
PHASE 14: A Pair of Tickets for a Slow Train to Xi'an (January 12, 1999)
PHASE 15: The Eternal City, Xi'an (January 19, 1999)
PHASE 16: Birds Without Wings (January 26, 1999)
PHASE 17: The Many Yesterdays and Today's (February 2, 1999)
PHASE 18: Under the Plasma Sky (February 9, 1999)
PHASE 19: 1/3 of Sorrow (February 16, 1999)
PHASE 20: The Unrelenting Rain of Xi'an (February 23, 1999)
PHASE 21: The Scarlet Awakening (March 2, 1999)
PHASE 22: The Cry (March 9, 1999)
PHASE 23: The Dream in the Circuit (March 16, 1999)
PHASE 24: The Girls beyond the Rainbow (March 23, 1999)
PHASE 25: Rays of Light (March 30, 1999)
PHASE 26: A Forever Blue Sky (Unaired)

== Music ==
Opening Theme:

"Proof of Myself" by Megumi Hayashibara

Ending Theme:

"Lively Motion" by Megumi Hayashibara

== See also ==
- Saber Marionette J
- Saber Marionette J Again
