= Fish in the Trap =

Manga and OVA

おさかなはあみの中 (Osakana wa Ami no Naka)
- Genre: Drama, Yaoi
- Manga
- Written by: Ranma Nekokichi
- Published by: Cherry Shobo
- Original run: January 1993 – November 1994
- Volumes: 3
- Original video animation
- Directed by: Takahiro Okabi
- Produced by: Tomoko Kawasaki
- Written by: Takahiro Okabi
- Music by: Minoru Kato
- Studio: J.C.Staff
- Released: July 20, 1994
- Runtime: 30 minutes

Fish in the Trap (おさかなはあみの中, Osakana wa Ami no Naka) is a three-volume Japanese yaoi manga that follows the relationship between a high school swim team captain and his young admirer. It was created by Ranma Nekokichi, and the OVA prequel offers a beforehand look into the characters' lives and relationships with each other. The manga is licensed in Russia by Comics Factory.

== Plot ==
The series begins when a five-year-old boy named Matsui Takahiro is playing with his friend Teru and his dog; suddenly, they both notice a blue-haired young man staring at them named Yuuji. Matsui doesn't know him but is surprised to hear Yuuji say, "I want a dog" before leaving the scene. Many years later Matsui is now a teenager and is seen hanging out with his best friend Eiichi Yoshino, then after watching a high school swimming competition, he falls in love with the swim captain and decides, upon entering his freshman year of high school, to take up swimming. The two eventually become involved in a relationship. However, the swim captain's old gang isn't so keen on this new boy who is constantly occupying their friend's time and thoughts. Matsui's own friend is against the relationship, as well.

== Characters ==
Yuuji Tsukamoto (塚本 祐二, Tsukamoto Yuuji)
Voiced by: Tōru Furusawa
A teenage high school student who is also the heir to a large business franchise. He is the captain of the swim team, and has had his eye on Matsui Takahiro for a while. Forced to take over his grandfather's company, Yuuji sees himself as the "fish in the trap", one who spends his entire life flailing helplessly in the palm of his grandfather's hand; unable to do anything to get free, unwilling to rebel, just allowing himself to be led and controlled.

Matsui Takahiro (タカヒロ 松井, Takahiro Matsui)
Voiced by: Kappei Yamaguchi
A troubled young boy who becomes involved with Yuuji Tsukamoto against his will. He harbors an interest in the older boy, but finds that he isn't quite prepared for the pace at which their relationship starts to blossom. He was once a loner, until he met his best friend, Yoshino Eiichi. He is devastated when he realizes that Eiichi, his most trusted confidante, also has romantic feelings for him.

Eiichi Yoshino (吉野 栄一, Yoshino Eiichi)
Voiced by: Nobuyuki Hiyama
Matsui Takahiro's best friend, the bespectacled Eiichi is deceptively docile-looking and kind. After transferring to Matsui's school, he quickly befriended the lonely boy, and the two became inseparable. Once Yuuji Tsukamoto begins to seduce Matsui, however, Eiichi's dark side emerges, and he becomes violent and aggressive towards his former best friend.

Azumaishi (あマシ)
Voiced by: Daiki Nakamura

Karakawa (カラカワ)
Voiced by: Nobuo Tobita

Tanoura (田ノ浦)
Voiced by: Takehito Koyasu

Teru (輝)
Voiced by: Tetsuya Iwanaga

Usui (臼井)
Voiced by: Yuuichi Meguro

== Media ==
=== Manga ===
No.	Release date	ISBN
1	February 1, 1993	4-87183-633-9
2	March 1, 1994	4-87183-939-7
3	November 10, 1994	4-87183-970-2

=== OVA ===
The Original Video Animation was made by JC Staff and released on June 20, 1994.

== Reception ==
Jonathan Clements and Helen McCarthy describe the OAV as being a funny "school shenanigans" story.
