= Dave Kelly (actor) =

Canadian actor and TV host

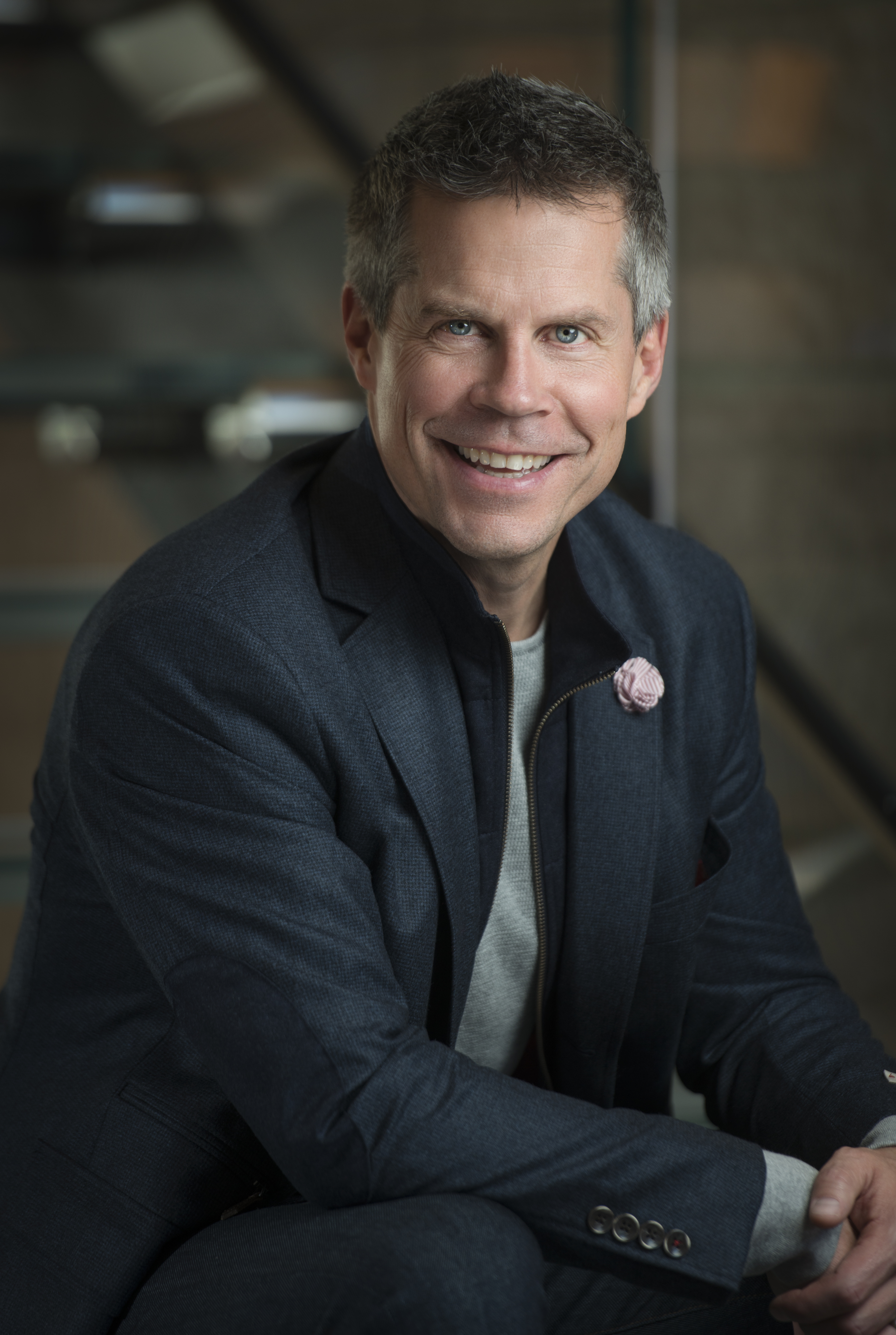
- Born: Canada
- Education: University of Alberta
- Occupations: Presenter, writer, actor

Dave Kelly is a Canadian host, writer, actor, and interviewer.

== Career ==
He is currently the host of “Dave Kelly Live,” a live talk show that features many of Canada's most notable performers, athletes, and personalities. Featured guests have included Jann Arden, Paul Brandt, Amber Marshall, George Canyon, Jocelyn Alice, Hayley Wickenheiser, Tom Jackson, Cassie Campbell, and Ian Tyson.

Early on in his career, he was one of the actors in the talent pool for English dub studio Blue Water Studios.

In 2018, Kelly was chosen to be the moderator for ‘A Conversation with Ellen DeGeneres’ in a number of major cities across Canada, where he led a one-on-one interview with Ellen in front of 15,000 people.

Kelly hosted The Big Breakfast on A-Channel Calgary from 1997 to 2005 and remained with the station after it became part of the Citytv network to host Breakfast Television through 2009.

Kelly is the co-founder of Kelly Brothers Productions, a content company based in Calgary and Toronto, specializing in video and live events. He is also an active philanthropist, currently on the board for the United Way of Calgary and co-chair for its $56-million fundraising campaign.

He lives in Calgary with his wife and two children.

== Filmography ==
Television
Year	Title	Role	Notes
1997–2005	The Big Breakfast (Calgary)	Self/host	
2001	Angel Links	Duuz Delax Rex, Cyrus	English dub
2001	Ceres, Celestial Legend	Kagami Mikage	English dub
2002	Mobile Fighter G Gundam	Ulube Ishikawa, Gala Garla, various	English dub
2002	Saber Marionette J to X	Gennai Shiraga, Pierrot the Clown, various	English dub
2003	Zoids	Prozen	English dub
2004	Mobile Suit Zeta Gundam	Bright Noa, Godoji Gosh, Hayai, Manack	English dub
2005–2009	Breakfast Television	Self/host	
2008-present	Dave Kelly Live	Self/host	

Video games
Year	Title	Role	Notes
2001	Mobile Suit Gundam: Journey to Jaburo	Garma Zabi, Boraskyniv	
