= Lightning Legend: Daigo no Daibouken =

1996 video game

- Front cover of Lightning Legend: Daigo no Daibouken.
- Developer: Konami Computer Entertainment Tokyo
- Publisher: Konami
- Composers: Akira Yamaoka; Ohamo Kotetsu; Matamata; Hitofumi Ushima; Yasuo Asai
- Platform: PlayStation
- Release: JP: December 20, 1996
- Genre: Fighting
- Modes: Story, Vs, Time Attack (hidden), Collection (hidden)

Lightning Legend: Daigo no Daibouken (ライトニングレジェンド 大悟の大冒険, lit. "Lighting Legend: Daigo's Great Adventure"), is a 1996 fighting video game developed by Konami Computer Entertainment Tokyo and published by Konami on the PlayStation. It is Konami's first 3D-based fighting game and was not released overseas.

== Gameplay ==
It is a 3D fighting game, which features 8 playable characters. There is also a story mode with role playing game elements. Story mode includes short anime cutscenes and dialogue between battles. Defeating enemies in this mode rewards players with up to 200 potential unique items.

There are several gameplay modes:

- Story Mode: The player moves across the world map as a chibi character and, upon encountering CPU characters, the scene transitions into a battle. After knocking out the last boss, Dragless, the player receives a separate ending.
- VS Mode
- Time Attack Mode (Hidden)
- Collection Mode (Hidden): This is the so-called special feature mode of the game. In this mode, the player can gain access to hidden costumes and stages by collecting various items from replaying battles. The items can be acquired through completing specific requirements (such as winning under 1 second, performing a general attack as the finishing blow, and double KO the CPU opponent) or by completing the collection of all 208 items.

== Fighters ==
Default Fighters (can be used across all modes)

- Daigo Raioh (雷王大悟) (Voiced by: Mariko Kouda)
- Yuki Shirogane (銀雪) (Voiced by: Yuri Shiratori)
- Mayu Uzaka (宇坂まゆ) (Voiced by: Junko Iwao)
- Adolf Rätsel (アドルフ・レーツェル) (Voiced by: Shō Hayami)
- Rankerk Hatred (ランカーク・ヘイトリッド) (Voiced by: Ryōtarō Okiayu)
- Terrific Forelock (テリフィック・フォーロック) (Voiced by: Toshiyuki Morikawa)
- Misa Atago (愛宕美砂) (Voiced by: Yuri Amano)
- Moko Moko (モコモコ) (Voiced by: Yuri Shiratori)

Imposter Fighter (that disguises as a subordinate of Dragless)

- Risa Atago (愛宕理砂)(Risa Atago is Misa's wild older sister) (Voiced by: Yuri Amano)

Secret Fighters (Upon satisfying certain requirements in the game, these fighters become usable in all modes, with the exception of story mode.)

- Naughty Nau (ノーティ・ノウ) (Voiced by: Satomi Kōrogi)
- Girigiri Oyaji (ギリギリ親父) (a.k.a. Mitsuru Gongōin) (Voiced by: Kenichi Ogata (voice actor))
- Demon King Dragless (魔王ドラグレス) (Voiced by: Norio Wakamoto) and is also the boss of the game
- K.O.J. (a.k.a. Shirogane Hirō) (Voiced by: Shōzō Iizuka)

== Reception ==
Weekly Famitsu gave it a score of 25/40.
