= Yuri Amano =

Japanese voice actress

- 天野 由梨
- Born: Tomoko Yoshikawa; January 5, 1966 (age 60); Fushimi-ku, Kyoto, Japan
- Occupation: Voice actress
- Years active: 1985–present
- Agent: Arts Vision

Yuri Amano (天野 由梨, Amano Yuri; born January 5, 1966) is a Japanese voice actress who is affiliated with Arts Vision. Her real name, as well as her former stage name, is Tomoko Yoshikawa (吉川 智子, Yoshikawa Tomoko). Her best known role is Rain Mikamura in Mobile Fighter G Gundam and Kiyone Makibi in the Tenchi Muyo! franchise. Other major roles include Asako Nakamura in Ushio and Tora, Keiko Yukimura in YuYu Hakusho, Alcyone in Magic Knight Rayearth, and Lorelei in the Saber Marionette J series. In video games, she voices Mary Argent in Tales of Destiny, Hokuto in Street Fighter EX, Ibuki in Street Fighter III, and Etoile Rosenqueen in the Marl Kingdom series.

== Filmography ==
=== Anime ===
List of voice performances in anime
Year	Series	Role	Notes	Source
1985	Shōwa Ahōzoshi Akanuke Ichiban	Student C	Debut role	
1988	Vampire Princess Miyu	Carlua	OVA	
1988–ongoing	Anpanman	Akachan-man		
1988	Legend of Galactic Heroes	Charlotte		
1989	Miracle Giants Dome-kun	Yuki		
1990	My Daddy Long Legs	Julia		
1990	Lightning Trap: Leina and Laika	Remy		
1990	Iczer Reborn	Shizuka Kawaii		
1990	Nineteen	girl in disco		
1991–97	Future GPX Cyber Formula series	Kyōko Aoi		
1991	Capricorn	Non		
1991	Armored Police Metal Jack	Yoshizawa Eriko		
1991	Magistrate of Darkness: Judge	Female employee		
1991	Otaku no Video	Satou Yuri		
1991	Ozanari Dungeon: The Tower of Wind	Priestess		
1991	Watashi to Watashi: Futari no Lotte	Nina		
1991	Gall Force: New Era	Garnet		
1991	Condition Green	Angie Page		
1992	Tekkaman Blade	Sofia		
1992	Sequence	Morio Megumi	OAV	
1992	Video Girl Ai	Moemi Hayakawa		
1992	Crayon Shin-chan	Hitoshi		
1992	Nozomi Witches	Kitagawa	Vol. 1	
1992	Ushio and Tora	Asako Nakamura		
1992	Yu Yu Hakusho	Keiko Yukimura		
1992	Eternal Filena	Elthena		
1992	Ashita e Free Kick	Mizuho Aritaka		
1992	Black Lion	Oyu	OVA	
1993	The Irresponsible Captain Tylor	Yuriko Star		
1993	The Brave Express Might Gaine	Izumi Matsubara, Tetsuya Yoshinaga		
1993	Moldiver	Jennifer		
1993	Legacy of Aru Kararu	Ress		
1993	Sailor Moon R	Berthier		
1993	Ocean Waves	Shimizu Akiko		
1993	Minky Momo: The Bridge Over Dreams	Girl		
1993	Idol Defense Force Hummingbird	Yayoi Toreishi	Also Theme Song Performance	
1993	Nekketsu Saikyo Gozaurer	Shinobu Asaoka, Shuuzou Nagata, Yuri Yayoi		
1994	Tenchi Muyo! Mihoshi Special	Kiyone Makibi		
1994	The Legend of Snow White	Snow White		
1994	New Cutie Honey	Gold Digger	Ep. 8	
1994	Mobile Fighter G Gundam	Rain Mikamura		
1994	Combustible Campus Guardress	Murasaki		
1994	Phantom Quest Corp.	Secretary		
1994	Tonde Burin	Kotoko	Ep. 35, 39	
1994	Mahōjin Guru Guru	Juju	TV series	
1994–97	Magic Knight Rayearth	Alcyone		
1994–98	Shadow Skill	Rirubelt	OAV and TV series	
1994	Blue Butterfly Fish	Ayuuru		
1994	Homeroom Affairs	Miyako Hase		
1994	Sins of the Sisters	Youko Miuchi		
1995	Zenki	Karuma		
1995	Sailor Moon SuperS	CereCere		
1995	Magical Girl Pretty Sammy	Kiyone Amayuri		
1995	Tenchi Universe	Kiyone Makibi		
1995	Kodocha	Yuko Mizuguchi		
1995	Wedding Peach	Mimiko, Reiko	Ep. 3, 27	
1995–98	El-Hazard	Ifurita	OVA1, TV1, TV2	
1995	Nurse Angel Ririka SOS	Moriya Madoka, Helena		
1995	Galaxy Fräulein Yuna: Siren's Sadness	Raika		
1995	Saber Marionette J	Lorelei		
1995	Twin Signal	Chris Sign		
1995	Kyouryuu Boukenki Jura Tripper	Tiger		
1995	Sotsugyou Sailor Victory	Margarita		
1996	Case Closed	Yoko Okino	Ep. 3, 21	
1996	After War Gundam X	Onimin	Ep. 15	
1996	Burn Up W	Nanvel		
1996	Landlock	Ansa	OAV	
1996	Saber Marionette J	Lorelei, Michael	ep. 10–11	
1996	Magical Project S	Kiyone Amayuri		
1996	Kiko-chan's Smile	Saori		
1996	Galaxy Fräulein Yuna: The Abyssal Fairy	Raika		
1996	The Vision of Escaflowne	Naria, Elise		
1997	Tenchi in Tokyo	Kiyone Makibi		
1997	Hyper Police	Poe (ep. 9, 16), Shiro		
1997–98	Chūka Ichiban!	Fei's mother	Ep. 12	
1997	Knights of Ramune	Cacao's mother	OAV	
1997	Fushigi Yûgi OVA 2	Miiru Kamishirou		
1997	Vampire Princess Miyu	Proton	TV series, ep. 11	
1997	Saber Marionette J Again	Lorelei		
1997–98	Burn-Up Excess	Nanbel		
1997	Photon: The Idiot Adventures	Rashara		
1997	Shinkai Densetsu Meremanoid	Megyan		
1998	Sexy Commando Gaiden: Sugoi yo!! Masaru-san	Doctor Mariko		
1998	All Purpose Cultural Cat Girl Nuku Nuku TV	Momoko Ishiyama		
1998	Trigun	Elizabeth	Ep. 6	
1998	Yu-Gi-Oh!	Miyuki Sakurai	Ep. 16	
1998	St. Luminous Mission High School	Matsushima Naoko		
1998	Saber Marionette J to X	Lorelei		
1998	Urayasu Tekkin Kazoku	Junko Oosawagi		
1999–2000	Corrector Yui	Sakura Kasuga	Also second series	
1999	Koume-chan Ga Iku!	Kimi-chan		
2003	Mermaid's Forest	Nae Kogure	TV series	
2004	Inuyasha	Tsukuyomi	Ep. 139, 140	
2004	Legendz: Tale of the Dragon Kings	BB Youko		
2004	The Marshmallow Times	Sandy's Mama		
2004	Melody of Oblivion	Hamasaki Keiko		
2004	Tsukuyomi Moon Phase	Hazuki's mother		
2005	Majokko Tsukune-chan	Nabule		
2005	Trinity Blood	Mirka Fortuna		
2005	Oku-sama wa Mahō Shōjo: Bewitched Agnes	Yuki Tanishimi / Valentine Valentino		
2005	Mushishi	Sayo		
2006	Hime-sama Goyōjin	Ebina Tsubaki		
2006	D.Gray-man	Crea	Ep. 1	
2006	Code Geass: Lelouch of the Rebellion	Kallen's mother	Ep. 9	
2007	Code-E	Akane Kuramochi		
2007	Kodomo no Jikan	Aki Kokonoe	Ep. 6	
2008	Nabari no Ou	Ichiki		
2008	Casshern Sins	Hoti		
2009	Fresh Pretty Cure!			
2009	Fullmetal Alchemist: Brotherhood	Sara Rockbell		
2009	Shin Koihime Musou	Ryuubi's mother		
2010	Strike Witches 2	Yoshika's mother		
2010	Yumeiro Patissiere	Michelle	Ep. 43	
2012	Love, Chunibyo & Other Delusions	Yūta's mother		
2013	Samurai Flamenco	Hidenori's mother		
2014	The Pilot's Love Song	Maria La Hire		
2014	Love, Chunibyo & Other Delusions -Heart Throb-	Yūta's mother		
2015	Kamisama Kiss◎	Nanami's mother	Ep. 11	

=== Anime films ===
List of voice performances in feature films
Year	Series	Role	Notes	Source
1991	Mobile Suit Gundam F91	Jessica		
1991	Tobe! Kujira no Peek			
1996	Tenchi the Movie: Tenchi Muyo in Love	Kiyone		
1997	Tenchi the Movie 2: The Daughter of Darkness	Kiyone		
1999	Tenchi Forever! The Movie	Kiyone Makibi		
2012	Strike Witches: The Movie	Sayaka Miyafuji		

=== Video games ===
List of voice performances in video games
Year	Series	Role	Notes	Source
1994	Hatsukoi Monogatari	Forshinia	PC Engine	
1994	KO Century BEAST Sanjuushi	Zott Suu	PC Engine	
1994–96	Advanced VG	Ayako Yuuki	PC Engine, PlayStation	
1994	Tanjou ~Debut~	Kusunoki Shinobu	PC Engine, Sega Saturn	
1994	Startling Odyssey II Maryuu Sensou	Patricia Hyneld	PC-Engine	
1994	Digital Ange	Foltjunia	PC98, PC Engine	
1994–95	Magic Knight Rayearth	Alcyone	Sega Saturn, others	
1995	Tenchi Muyo! Ryo-Ohki	Kiyone	PC-FX	
1995	Power Dolls 2	Lisa Kim	PlayStation	
1996	Rapyulus Panic	Namie	Sega Saturn	
1996	Angel Graffiti Anata e no Profile	Amano Misuzu	PlayStation	
1996	Harukaze Sentai V Force	Aoi Kagetsu	PlayStation	
1996	Street Fighter EX series	Hokuto		
1996	Lightning Legend: Daigo no Daibouken	Misa Atago, Risa Atago	PlayStation	
1996	Fire Woman Matoigumi	Seta Hiromi	PC FX	
1997	Marika Shinjitsu no Sekai	Oruga	Sega Saturn	
1997	Next King Koi no Sennen Okoku	Anice	PlayStation	
1997	Bulk Slash	Riizen Lavia	Sega Saturn	
1997	Super Robot Wars F	Rain	PlayStation, Sega Saturn	
1997	Mahō Gakuen Lunar!	Palea	Sega Saturn	
1997	Galaxy Fräulein Yuna 3: Lightning Angel	Raika	Sega Saturn	
1997	Tales of Destiny	Mary Argent	PlayStation	
1997	Arunamu no Tsubasa	Mayukoda	PlayStation	
1997	Street Fighter III series	Ibuki	Arcade	
1998	Yuukyuu Gensoukyoku 2nd Album	Eve Callagher	PlayStation, Sega Saturn	
1998	EVE The Lost One	Suzuta Natsumi	Sega Saturn	
1998	Zoku Hatsukoi Monogatari	Iwadate Maki	PC FX	
1998	Super Robot Wars F Final	Rain	PlayStation	
1998	Sōkaigi	Hifumi Sudo		
1998	Lupin Sanse Pyramid no Kenja Lupin the Third and the Mystery of the Pyramid	Princess of Twilight		
1998	Nijiiro Twinkle: Guruguru Dai-sakusen	Cleardonny	PS, Windows	
1998	Advanced VG 2	Ayako Yuuki	PlayStation	
1998	Rhapsody: A Musical Adventure	Etoile Rosenqueen	PlayStation	
1998	Thousand Arms	Jeala	PlayStation	
1999	Device Reign	Utsuki Riko	PlayStation, Sega Saturn	
1999	Sonata	Oozone Chihaya	PlayStation	
1999	Cyber Formula Aratanaru Chousensha	Kyoko Aoi	PlayStation	
1999	Little Princess: Marl Ōkoku no Ningyō Hime 2	Etoile Rosenqueen, Ran Ran	PlayStation, PlayStation Network	
2000	Skies of Arcadia	Belleza	Dreamcast	
2001	Sakura Taisen 3	Nadel	Dreamcast	
2006	Valkyrie Profile 2: Silmeria	Chrystie, Crescent, Lwyn, Lydia, Phyress, Sha-Kon		

=== Audio dramas ===
List of voice performances in audio dramas
Series	Role	Notes	Source
Angel Force			
Dennou Sentai Voogie's Ange	Marcia		
Device Reign			
Digital Ange	Foltjunia		
The Legend of Heroes II: Prophecy of the Moonlight Witch	Lizu		
El-Hazard	Ifurita		
Fire Emblem			
Garland: Silent no Shou	Tiana		
Harukaze Sentai V Force	Aoi Kagetsu		
Hoshin Engi	Ryuukitsu Koushu		
Idol Boueitai Hummingbird	Toreishi Yayoi		
Karakurizōshi Ayatsuri Sakon			
Kodomotachi wa Yoru no Juunin			
Kyouryuu no Mimi Volume 2			
Landlock	Ansa		
Next King: Koi no Sennen Oukoku Gaiden	Anice		
Parasite Eve			
Pathway for Santa Claus -Santa ga kureta okurimono-			
Photon	Rashara		
Power Dolls	Julia Rayberg	CD radio	
Revive...Portrait-2			
Street Fighter EX	Hokuto	CD radio	
Suehiro Shoutengai Pre-Drama CD -Prelude-	Mizusawa Kasumi		
Susume! Super Angels!	Masako		
Tales of Destiny	Mary Argent		
Tenchi Muyo!	Kiyone		
Tengai Makyou vol. 2			
Yuukyuu Gensoukyoku "Yuukyuu Ongakusai"			
Yuukyuu Gensoukyoku Ensemble volume 1	Eve Callagher		

- My Codename is Charmer (Kaede Saginomori)
- Dengeki Bunko Best Game Selection7 Fire Emblem Tabidachi no Sho (Sheeda)

=== Dubbing ===
List of voice performances in overseas dubbing
Year	Series	Role	Notes	Source
1990	Rocky V	Jewel	Voice dub for Elisebeth Peters	
	Monkey Trouble	Shujinko (Hero)		
1998	Aaahh!!! Real Monsters	Echnida		

== Discography ==
=== Albums ===
- Fairy
- Water Lily
