= Nobuo Tobita =

Japanese voice actor and narrator (born 1959)

- 飛田 展男
- Born: November 6, 1959 (age 67); Ibaraki Prefecture, Japan
- Occupations: Voice actor; narrator
- Years active: 1982–present
- Agent: Arts Vision

Nobuo Tobita (飛田 展男, Tobita Nobuo; born November 6, 1959) is a Japanese voice actor and narrator from Ibaraki Prefecture. He is represented by Arts Vision.

He is most known for the roles of Kamille Bidan (Mobile Suit Zeta Gundam), Albert Heinrich/004 (Cyborg 009 (2001)), and Sueo Maruo (Chibi Maruko-chan). His debut role is Bob in the 1982 anime television series Cybot Robotchi. He has also voiced many characters for the story CDs in Sound Horizon.

== Filmography ==
=== Television animation ===
1982

- Cybot Robotchi (Bob)

1983

- Captain Tsubasa (Ken Wakashimazu)

1985

- Mobile Suit Zeta Gundam (Kamille Bidan)

1986

- Mobile Suit Gundam ZZ (Kamille Bidan)

1987

- Ai no Wakakusa Monogatari (Little Women) (Theodore "Laurie" Laurence)

1991

- Goldfish Warning! (Aoi)

1993

- Dragon League (Announcer, Deken, White Dragon, Golden Dragon)
- Mobile Suit Victory Gundam (Mathis Walker)
- Shima Shima Tora no Shimajirō (Mr. Meemee, Karakusa)

1994

- Mobile Fighter G Gundam (Ulube Ishikawa)

1995

- Brave Police J-Decker (Neuva Fahrzeug)
- Fushigi Yūgi (Tomo)

1996

- Rurouni Kenshin (Takeda Kanryū)

2001

- Cyborg 009 (Albert Heinrich/004)
- Dennō Bōkenki Webdiver (Daitalion)
- Kirby: Right Back at Ya! (Chef Kawasaki, Kabu, Kine, Samo, Additional Voices)
- PaRappa the Rapper (Paddle)

2002

- GetBackers (Kuroudou Akabane)
- Kiddy Grade (Sinistra)
- Naruto (Ebisu)

2004

- Transformers Superlink (Nightscream, Signal Flare, Sprung, Buildron)
- Sgt. Frog (Viper)

2005

- Oh My Goddess! (Toshiyuki Aoshima)

2006

- Bleach (Narrator, Kurodo, Michel)
- Code Geass (Clovis La Britannia)
- Oh My Goddess! Sorezore no Tsubasa (Toshiyuki Aoshima)

2007

- Naruto Shippuden (Zetsu)

2008

- Persona -trinity soul- (Kimoto Yūji)
- Slayers REVOLUTION (Zuuma)

2010

- Hakuouki (Yamanami Keisuke "Sannan-san")

2011

- Shakugan no Shana III -FINAL- (Dantalion)
- Shiki (Hayami)

2012

- Accel World (Black Vise)
- JoJo's Bizarre Adventure (Straizo)
- One Piece (Pekoms)

2013

- Hunter × Hunter (Second Series) - Meleoron
- Saint Seiya Omega (Apsu)
- Samurai Flamenco (Narration)
- Tokyo Ravens (Ashiya Douman)
- DokiDoki! PreCure (Leva)

2014

- Akatsuki no Yona: Yona of the Dawn (Kan Soo-jin)
- M3 the dark metal (Natsuiri)

2015

- One-Punch Man (Sitch)
- Shirobako (Sugesuke Enjō)
- Mr. Osomatsu (Dayōn)
- Plastic Memories (Takao Yamonobe)
- The Asterisk War (Shuma Sakon)

2016

- Beyblade Burst (Principal Hidetaro Shinoda)
- D.Gray-man Hallow (Sheril Kamelot)
- The Great Passage (Professor Oda)
- Re:Zero − Starting Life in Another World (Petelgeuse's Finger (Man 2))

2017

- Saga of Tanya the Evil (Adelheid von Schugel)
- Clockwork Planet (Governor)
- Kono Subarashii Sekai ni Shukufuku wo! 2 (Keele)
- Atom: The Beginning (Han Shunsaku)
- Mahojin Guru Guru (Kaya (ep. 3, 6, 8, 10, 14 - 19, 21 - 23))
- Street Fighter V (Zeku)

2018

- Darling in the Franxx (Papa)
- Xuan Yuan Sword Luminary (Assassin)
- Tokyo Ghoul (Shiki Kijima)
- Sirius the Jaeger (Klarwein)

2019

- Domestic Girlfriend (Akihito Fujii)
- GeGeGe no Kitarō 6th series (Vampire La Seine (ep. 57))
- Isekai Quartet (Adelheid von Schugel)
- Phantasy Star Online 2: Episode Oracle as Gettemhart
- Revisions (Seiichirō Muta)
- One Piece (Ashura Doji)

2020

- Id:Invaded (Nishio Shirakoma)
- In/Spectre (Kodama no Genichirō)
- Pet (Company President)
- BNA: Brand New Animal (Dante)

2021

- Mieruko-chan (Junji Rōsoku)
- The Faraway Paladin (Gus)
- Yashahime: Princess Half-Demon (Shōgen Mamiana)

2022

- Detective Conan: Zero's Tea Time (Yuya Kazami)

2023

- My Love Story with Yamada-kun at Lv999 (Takezo Kamota)
- Yohane the Parhelion: Sunshine in the Mirror (Tonosama)
- Ayaka: A Story of Bonds and Wounds (Sanji Inō)

2024

- Meiji Gekken: 1874 (Kawaji Toshiyoshi)
- Dungeon People (Old Master)
- No Longer Allowed in Another World (Miller)

2025

- Possibly the Greatest Alchemist of All Time (Papekku)

2026

- Petals of Reincarnation (Alan Smithee)
- Liar Game (Kazuo Fujisawa)
- The World Is Dancing (Nijo Yoshimoto)

2027

- Oishinbo (Daizō Ōhara)

Unknown date

- Bola Kampung (Santokh)
- Bonobono (Shimatchū Oji-san, other voices)
- Chibi Maruko-chan (Sueo Maruo)
- Detective School Q (Yutaka Saburōmaru)
- Digimon Xros Wars (Mad Leomon)
- DokiDoki! PreCure (Leva)
- Durarara!!x2 Shō (Jinnai Yodogiri)
- Makai Senki Disgaea (Captain Gordon)
- Earthian (Hoshino)
- FAKE (Randy "Ryo" MacLean)
- Finder no Hyouteki - ANIMIX (Feilong Liu)
- Fish in the Trap (Kawakara)
- Flame of Recca (Domon Ishijima)
- Gankutsuou (Baptistin)
- Hellsing Ultimate (The Major)
- Hiwou War Chronicles (Sai)
- I Can Hear the Sea (Taku Morisaki)
- Kaito Joker (Mister Kaneari)
- Konjiki no Gash Bell!! (Shin'ichi)
- Madara (Shamon)
- Magician's Academy (Hapsiel)
- Martian Successor Nadesico (Seiya Uribatake)
- Rockman EXE (Raoul)
- Microman (Edison)
- Miracle Girls (Kōhei Yamagishi)
- Mobile Suit Gundam SEED Astray (Rondo Ghina Sahaku)
- Naruto (Ebisu, Zetsu)
- Naruto: Shippuden (Ebisu, Zetsu, White Zetsu Army, Guruguru)
- Nobunagun (Oda Nobunaga)
- Okane ga nai (Kaoruko Someya)
- Otaku no Video (Yamaguchi)
- Please Save My Earth (Daisuke Dobashi and Hiiragi)
- Saber Marionette J, Saber Marionette J Again Saber Marionette J to X (Obiichi Soemon and Yang Ming)
- Sailor Moon (Jinta Araki (114), Yamagishi (145), Honjo (154))
- Sailor Moon Supers: The Movie (Poupelin)
- Saint Seiya (Aries Shion)
- Samurai Deeper Kyo (Fubuki)
- SoltyRei (Ashley Links)
- Sohryuden: Legend of the Dragon Kings (Tsuzuku Ryudo)
- Super Milk Chan (Dr. Eyepatch)
- Tekkaman Blade (both Pegas and Tekkaman Dagger)
- Tekkaman Blade II (Pegas II)
- The Marshmallow Times (Nats)
- Tokimeki Memorial Only Love (Misao Kurotokage)
- Uta Kata (Sei Tōdō)
- Transformers SuperLink (Nightscream)
- Wan Wan Serebu Soreyuke! Tetsunoshin (Doppel)
- Yu-Gi-Oh! (Kiwami Warashibe)
- YuYu Hakusho (Suzaku)
- Zaion: I Wish You Were Here (Mitsuo Satake)

=== Original net animation (ONA) ===
- The Way of the Househusband (2021) (Urita)
- Cyberpunk: Edgerunners 2 (2026) (Kitano)

=== Original video animation (OVA) ===
- Choujin Locke - Lord Leon (1989) (Locke)
- Mobile Suit Gundam 0083: Stardust Memory (1991) (Karius)
- Kingyo Chūihō! Genkijirusi no Nakanatachi (1991) (Aoi)
- Angel Densetsu (1996) (Seichiro Kitano)
- Kimera (1996) (Kimera)
- Hellsing (Major)

=== Theatrical animation ===
- Inuyasha the Movie: Fire on the Mystic Island (2004) (Kyōra)
- Dead Leaves (2004) (Chinko Drill)
- Mobile Suit Zeta Gundam: A New Translation - Heirs to the Stars (2005) (Kamille Bidan)
- Mobile Suit Zeta Gundam: A New Translation II - Lovers (2005) (Kamille Bidan)
- Mobile Suit Zeta Gundam: A New Translation III - Love is the Pulse of the Stars (2006) (Kamille Bidan)
- Road to Ninja: Naruto the Movie (2012) (Zetsu)
- Detective Conan: The Darkest Nightmare (2016) (Yuya Kazami)
- Fireworks, Should We See It from the Side or the Bottom? (2017)
- Detective Conan: Zero the Enforcer (2018) (Yuya Kazami)
- Mr. Osomatsu: The Movie (2019) (Dayōn)
- Blackfox (2019) (Lauren)
- Crayon Shin-chan: Crash! Rakuga Kingdom and Almost Four Heroes (2020)
- Princess Principal: Crown Handler Movie 1 (2021) (Bishop/Mr. Winston)
- Mr. Osomatsu: Hipipo-Zoku to Kagayaku Kajitsu (2022) (Dayōn)
- Sand Land (2023) (General Zeu)
- Hokkyoku Hyakkaten no Concierge-san (2023) (Tōdō)
- Birth of Kitarō: The Mystery of GeGeGe (2023) (Tokimaro Ryuga)
- Detective Conan: One-Eyed Flashback (2025) (Yuya Kazami)
- Demon Slayer: Kimetsu no Yaiba – The Movie: Infinity Castle (2025) (Hakuji's father)
- The Keeper of the Camphor Tree (2026)
- The Apothecary Diaries: The Late Lady's Treasure (2026) (Birou)

=== Video games ===
- Kingyo Chūihō! Tobidase! Game Gakuen (1994) (Aoi)
- Angelique (1994) (Lumiale)
- Ayumayu Gekijou (2001) (Ibuki Jun)
- Ore no Shita de Agake (2002) (Yukio Yamaguchi)
- Final Fantasy XII (2006) (Vayne Solidor)
- Tales of Berseria (2016) (Melchior)
- Street Fighter V (2017) (Zeku)
- Mega Man 11 (2018) (Dr. Light and Auto)
- Fate/Grand Order (2022) (Don Quixote)
- SD Gundam Battle Alliance (2022) (Kamille Bidan)
- Witch on the Holy Night (2022) (Yurihiko Tokitsu)
- Arknights (2025) (Sankta Miksaparato)
- Trails in the Sky 1st Chapter (2025) (Professor Alba)

Unknown date

- Another Century's Episode series (Kamille Bidan)
- BioShock Infinite (Cornelius Slate)
- Call of Duty: Black Ops (Friedrich Steiner)
- Captain Tsubasa 5: Hasha no Shogo Campione (Ken Wakashimazu)
- Disgaea: Hour of Darkness (Captain Gordon)
- Everybody's Golf 2 (Ben)
- Final Fantasy X-2 (Logos)
- Hakuoki Shinsengumi Kitan (Sannan Keisuke)
- Hakuoki Shinsengumi Kitan (PSP) (Sannan Keisuke)
- Hakuoki Shinsengumi Kitan (PS3) (Sannan Keisuke)
- Hakuoki Yugiroku (Sannan Keisuke)
- Hakuoki Zuisouroku (Sannan Keisuke)
- Heroes Phantasia (Zuuma)
- Kidou Senshi Gundam: Gundam vs. Gundam series (Kamille Bidan, Rondo Gina Sahaku)
- Knuckle Heads (Rob Vincent, Gregory Darrell)
- Lego Dimensions (X-PO)
- Natsuki Crisis Battle (Naoya Hondō)
- Phantasy Star Online 2 (Gettemhart)
- SD Gundam G Generation series (Kamille Bidan, Ulube Ishikawa, Rondo Gina Sahaku)
- Super Robot Wars series (Kamille Bidan, Son Ganlon)
- Tales of Destiny 2 (Karell Berselius)

=== Drama CDs ===
- Shiawase ni Dekiru series 2 (2003) (Morita)

Unknown date

- 3 Ji Kara Koi wo Suru series 3: 3 Ji Kara Koi wo Suru III (Yasuhisa Ooishi)
- Baito wa Maid!? (Shouji Toba)
- Baito wa Maid!? 2 - Shuubun!? Senden!? (Shouji Toba)
- Eien no Midori ~Nochinoomohini~ (Kazuhiko Sakuma)
- Gin no Requiem (Samara)
- Kimi ga Suki Nanosa (Hirose Okitsugu)
- Konoyo Ibun series 1: Konoyo Ibun (Keiichirou Minamiura)
- Konoyo Ibun series 2: Sono no San (Keiichirou Minamiura)
- Konoyo Ibun series 3: Kitsune no Yomeiri (Keiichirou Minamiura)
- La Vie En Rose (Masumi Ootori)
- Lesson XX (Shizuka Morifuji)
- Mirage of Blaze series 4: Washi yo, Tarega Tameni Tobu (Hakkai)
- Mossore
- Okane ga nai series 1 (Kaoruko Someya)
- Okane ga nai series 2: Okane Shika Nai (Kaoruko Someya)
- Okane ga nai series 3: Kawaige Nai (Kaoruko Someya)
- Okane ga nai series 4: Okane ja Kaenai (Kaoruko Someya)
- Shosen Kedamono series 3: Ryuuou no Hanayome (Reiga)
- Sora to Hara (Satoshi Arisaka)
- Soryamou Aideshou series 2 (Mimei Kanda)
- Trap series 3: Sokubaku Trap

=== Tokusatsu ===
- Kamen Rider Den-O (2007) (Bloodsucker Imagin (ep. 27 - 28))
- Samurai Sentai Shinkenger (2009) (Ayakashi Kagekamuro (ep. 1))
- Tensou Sentai Goseiger (2010) (Brajira of the Messiah (eps. 45 - 50)/Buredoran of the Comet (eps. 1 - 15, 45)/Buredoran of the Chupacabra (eps. 17 - 29, 45)/Buredo-RUN of the Cyborg (eps. 39 - 45))
- Tensou Sentai Goseiger vs. Shinkenger: Epic on Ginmaku (2011) (Buredoran of the Chimatsuri/Buredoran of the Comet/Buredoran of the Chupacabra)
- Gokaiger Goseiger Super Sentai 199 Hero Great Battle (2011) (Brajira of the Messiah, Buredoran clones)
- Kamen Rider × Super Sentai: Super Hero Taisen (2012) (Brajira of the Messiah, Buredoran clones)
- Ressha Sentai ToQger (2014) (Mannenhitsu Shadow (ep. 36))
- Doubutsu Sentai Zyuohger (2016) (Hattena (ep. 12))
- Uchu Sentai Kyuranger (2017) (Mozuma (ep. 10))
- Kaitou Sentai Lupinranger VS Keisatsu Sentai Patranger (2018) (Namero Baccio (ep. 1, 3))

=== Dubbing ===
==== Live-action ====
- Steve Carell
  - The Office (Michael Scott)
  - Dinner for Schmucks (Berry)
  - Foxcatcher (John Eleuthère du Pont)
  - The Big Short (Mark Baum)
  - Beautiful Boy (David Sheff)
- August (Cyrus Ogilvie (David Bowie))
- The Big White (Ted Waters (Giovanni Ribisi))
- Cedar Rapids (Tim Lippe (Ed Helms))
- The Conjuring (Roger Perron (Ron Livingston))
- Constantine (Beeman (Max Baker))
- Cradle 2 the Grave (Su (Jet Li))
- Diana (Paul Burrell (Douglas Hodge))
- Genius (Niels Bohr (David Dencik))
- Green Book (Oleg (Dimiter D. Marinov))
- Houdini (Jim Collins (Evan Jones))
- House of Cards (Bill Shepherd (Greg Kinnear))
- Intolerable Cruelty (Wrigley (Paul Adelstein))
- Iron Man 2 (2012 TV Asahi edition) (Justin Hammer (Sam Rockwell))
- It (Mr. Keene (Joe Bostick))
- It Chapter Two (Mr. Keene (Joe Bostick))
- Joy Ride 2: Dead Ahead (Rusty Nail (Mark Gibbon))
- The Legend of Ochi (Maxim (Willem Dafoe))
- Look Who's Back (Adolf Hitler (Oliver Masucci))
- Lucy (Mr. Jang (Choi Min-sik))
- Monty Python's The Meaning of Life (Terry Gilliam)
- Night of the Living Dead (Tom Bitner (William Butler))
- Ready or Not (Tony Le Domas (Henry Czerny))
- Romeo Must Die (Han Sing (Jet Li))
- Scooby-Doo 2: Monsters Unleashed (Patrick Wisely (Seth Green))
- The Scorpion King (Arpid (Grant Heslov))
- Spider-Man (Ted Hoffman (Ted Raimi))
- Spider-Man 2 (Ted Hoffman (Ted Raimi))
- Spider-Man 3 (Ted Hoffman (Ted Raimi))
- Staged (Michael Sheen)
- Tale of Tales (King of Highhills (Toby Jones))
- The Thundermans (Dr. Colosso (Dana Snyder))
- Train to Busan (Captain of KTX (Seok-yong Jeong))
- Transformers: Rise of the Beasts (Scourge (Peter Dinklage))
- Watchmen (Ozymandias (Matthew Goode))
- West Side Story (1990 TBS edition) (Joyboy (Robert Banas))
- The Wraith (1992 TV Asahi edition) (Minty (Chris Nash))

==== Animation ====
- Beast Wars (Terrorsaur, Quickstrike)
- Chuggington (Skylar)
- Jellystone! (Snagglepuss)
- Madagascar 3: Europe's Most Wanted (Skipper)
- Mighty Morphin Power Rangers (Quagmire)
- My Little Pony: Friendship Is Magic (Hoity Toity)
- The Penguins of Madagascar (Skipper)
- Penguins of Madagascar (Skipper)
- Power Rangers: Turbo (Clockster)
- Shrek series (Pinocchio)
- South Park: Bigger, Longer & Uncut (Tom the News Reporter, The Baldwin Brothers)
- The Simpsons (Milhouse Van Houten, Dr. Frink, Scratchy)
- Transformers Animated (Captain Fanzone, Soundwave)
- Transformers: Prime (Ratchet)
