= Saber Marionette J =

Japanese anime television series

- North American DVD collection cover, featuring all protagonists

セイバーマリオネットJ (Seibā Marionetto Jei)
- Genre: Harem; Romantic comedy; Science fiction
- Created by: Satoru Akahori
- Anime television series
- Directed by: Masami Shimoda
- Produced by: Noriko Kobayashi; Shinjirō Yokoyama
- Written by: Mayori Sekijima
- Music by: Parome
- Studio: Studio Junio
- Licensed by: NA: Bandai Entertainment
- Original network: TXN (TV Tokyo)
- Original run: October 1, 1996 – March 25, 1997
- Episodes: 25
- Manga
- Written by: Satoru Akahori
- Illustrated by: Yumisuke Kotoyoshi
- Published by: Kadokawa Shoten
- English publisher: AUS: Madman Entertainment; NA: Tokyopop
- Magazine: Monthly Dragon Age
- Original run: October 1996 – November 1999
- Volumes: 5
- Light novel
- Written by: Satoru Akahori
- Illustrated by: Tsukasa Kotobuki
- Published by: Fujimi Shobo
- Imprint: Fujimi Fantasia Bunko
- Original run: April 1995 – July 1, 1999
- Volumes: 14
- Video game

Saber Marionette J: Battle Sabers
- Developer: Tom Create, Co.
- Publisher: Bandai Visual
- Genre: Fighting
- Platform: PlayStation
- Released: March 28, 1997
- Audio drama

Saber Marionette Radio
- Studio: King Records
- Station: TBS
- Original run: April 17, 1997 – July 3, 1997
- Episodes: 32
- icon

Saber Marionette J (Japanese: セイバーマリオネットJ, Hepburn: Seibā Marionetto Jei) is a Japanese anime television series produced by Studio Junio. aired on TV Tokyo from October 1, 1996, to March 25, 1997. It is the first installment of the Saber Marionette franchise. The show was localized in North America by Ocean Productions and into six other languages by various companies.

In between production, Saber Marionette J spun off into other media. A manga serialized in Kadokawa Shoten's Dragon Age magazine ran from October 1996 to November 1999, and was collected into five volumes. A concurrent radio drama was broadcast and the show's original soundtrack was published by Kings Records. The show was also the basis for a PlayStation fighting game called Saber Marionette J: Battle Sabers, developed and published by Tom Create.

== Plot ==
Otaru Mamiya is an 18-year-old day laborer living on his own in the fictional city state of Japoness. Employed as a fish peddler and running a morning's catch, he is hit by a car driven by Mitsurugi Hanagata, an acquaintance, spoiling his merchandise and sparking a fight the two agree to take elsewhere.

Traveling to a gully outside of the town, the boys continue their quarrel on a bridge where a skilled Otaru makes quick work of his opponent. In an unfortunate turn of events however, Otaru, balancing himself on a fence post which breaks off, is dumped into the river below where he is helplessly washed away.

Moments later, having drifted ashore in a small pond, Otaru finds himself at a rural athenaeum, the Japoness Pioneer Museum. He curiously explores the decrepit building, falling through a trapdoor and into a secret underground basement where he finds and awakens an encapsulated marionette. She introduces herself as Lime, embracing the dumbfounded boy with a laugh and revealing an unprecedented ability to express emotion.

=== Setting ===
The prologue of Saber Marionette J is set sometime into the 22nd century, when Earth's population has grown to such a magnitude that humanity cannot feasibly continue without colonizing space. The initial stages of the project make a promising effort of moving civilization into orbit, however it is during travel to a planet name Terra II that a transport vessel, the Mesopotamia, experiences a catastrophic fate, destroying all but a lone escape pod of people who plunge to the surface below. Of the handful of survivors however, only six males survive the crash, a ratio that both cripples their manpower and leaves them unable to reproduce.

Marooned and without communication, the men turn to genetic engineering as a method to produce clones of themselves, enough to populate the planet and sustain habitation. The effort is critically fruitful, and over a course of three centuries, each of the survivors and their successors establish individual settlements in the form of six city-states.

In spite of the remarkable success however, notwithstanding even advancements in technology, Terra II remains uninhabited by women. An effort to substitute this absence is made with the manufacture of feminine androids name marionettes; creations that, while they serve their purpose, operate without sapience, emotion, or free will.

=== Themes ===
Saber Marionette J contains several groups of notable themes, mainly in the names of characters and locations. The focal heroines, Lime, Cherry, and Bloodberry, are named after fruits, while their counterparts, Tiger, Luchs,^{[a]} and Panther are named after animals, specifically of the family Felidae (using the German words and pronunciations for tiger, lynx, and panther due to their Galtland origins). Ieyasu Tokugawa, the fictional shogun of Japoness, derives his name and appearance from Tokugawa Ieyasu, while Gerhardt von Faust, führer of Galtland, is an allusion of Adolf Hitler whose name may be derived from Faust, a character of German folklore.

The city-states established by the male survivors are also based on the political and developmental histories and periods of countries. Japoness is a reminiscence of feudal Japan, Galtland portrays the totalitarian regime of Nazi Germany, Peterburg is structured after Soviet Russia, New Texas is representative of the modern United States, Xi'an paints the image of Imperial China and Romana takes after the Roman Empire. The letters that affix the titles of the franchise have also been explained to represent the city-state in which a particular series is set in. Saber Marionette R, for example, takes place in Romana while Saber Marionette J, occurs in Japoness.

Besides the show's botanic, animal and historic references, as well as its generally comedic overtones, Saber Marionette J briefly explores deeper motifs as well. One such motif, outspoken by Mitsurugi, is the discriminatory notion that marionettes are of no importance to humans beyond their menial labor, and should be disenfranchised to the affection or privileges of people. This idea becomes more recurrent later in the series when Otaru finds himself growing closer to the girls and questions himself for it. Another visited theme is the exploration of life, its senescence, and death. These truths have a major impact on the girls' developmental identity as they come to terms with themselves and humans.

== Characters ==
Saber Marionette J follows the life and adventures of Otaru Mamiya (間宮 小樽, Mamiya Otaru; voiced by Yuka Imai in its original Japanese and by Brad Swaile in its English dub), an obstinate young man, who through mishap and predestination, goes from a nondescript street vendor to a national hero and sensation. During the onset of the series, Otaru comes into the inadvertent acquisition of three marionettes; Lime (ライム, Raimu; v.b. Megumi Hayashibara and Maggie Blue O'Hara), a wildly effervescent girl with a knack for mischief; Cherry (チェリー, Cherī; v.b. Yuri Shiratori and Erin Fitzgerald and Nicole Oliver), the gentle and soft-spoken mind with gifted culinary skills; and Bloodberry (ブラッドベリー, Buraddoberī; v.b. Akiko Hiramatsu and Saffron Henderson), a bold and voluptuous woman with vigor matched only by her libido. Warranted by their unique ability to show mood and temperament, it is explained that each of the girls possess a heart-like technology, known as a maiden circuit, that empowers them with emotion. Mitsurugi Hanagata (花形 美剣, Hanagata Mitsurugi; v.b. Takehito Koyasu and Samuel Vincent), the effeminate gay acquaintance who has a crush on Otaru and whose reckless driving more or less sets the premise of the show, also bands together with the group on their travels and as their neighbor when his mansion is burned down.

The show's focal antagonists and their endeavors are fronted by Gailhart von Faust (ゲルハルト・フォン・ファウスト, Geruharuto fon Fausto; v.b. Hikaru Midorikawa and Paul Dobson), the megalomaniac dictator of Gartlant who campaigns to conquer his neighboring sovereigns in order to control all of Terra II. Like Otaru, Faust is supported by his own trio of marionettes, collectively known as the Saber Dolls, who are structurally villainous counterparts to Lime, Cherry and Bloodberry: Tiger (ティーゲル, Tīgeru; v.b. Urara Takano and Venus Terzo), the tenacious and emotionally subservient leader; Luchs (ルクス, Rukusu; v.b. Yuko Mizutani and Erin Fitzgerald and Colleen Wheeler), an intelligent and accomplished strategist; and Panther (パンター, Pantā; v.b. Kikuko Inoue and Samantha Ferris), a loud and vicious blonde. In a complementing fashion, each of these girls also possess maiden circuits.

== Cast ==
Saber Marionette J cast
Role	Japanese	English	
Role	Japanese	Ocean Productions	
Narrator	Shigeru Chiba	2-4	Richard Newman
Narrator	Shigeru Chiba	5	Don Brown
Narrator	Shigeru Chiba	7-18	Paul Dobson
Otaru Mamiya	Yuka Imai	Brad Swaile	Brad Swaile
Lime	Megumi Hayashibara	Maggie Blue O'Hara	Maggie Blue O'Hara
Cherry	Yuri Shiratori	3-13	Erin Fitzgerald
Cherry	Yuri Shiratori	14-25	Nicole Oliver
Bloodberry	Akiko Hiramatsu	Saffron Henderson	Saffron Henderson
Mitsurugi Hanagata	Takehito Koyasu	Sam Vincent	Sam Vincent
Gerhard von Faust	Hikaru Midorikawa	Paul Dobson	Paul Dobson
Tiger	Urara Takano	Venus Terzo	Venus Terzo
Luchs	Yūko Mizutani	2-9	Erin Fitzgerald
Luchs	Yūko Mizutani	10-25	Colleen Wheeler
Ieyasu Tokugawa	Kenichi Ogata	Don Brown	Don Brown
Hikozaemon	Shigeru Chiba	Paul Dobson	Paul Dobson
Soemon Obiichi	Nobuo Tobita	Richard Newman	Richard Newman
Baiko	Ai Orikasa	Nicole Oliver	Nicole Oliver
Tamasaburou	Maria Kawamura	Ellen Kennedy	Ellen Kennedy
Lorelei	Yuri Amano	Ellen Kennedy	Ellen Kennedy
Panther	Kikuko Inoue	Samantha Ferris	Samantha Ferris
Gennai Shiraga	Chō	French Tickner	French Tickner
Yumeji Hanagata	Urara Takano	Ellen Kennedy	Ellen Kennedy
General Goettel	Kenyu Horiuchi	Richard Newman	Richard Newman
Dr. Hesse	Tomohiro Nishimura	Paul Dobson	Paul Dobson

== Localization ==
Saber Marionette J was reproduced into seven languages through a joint cooperation of different companies. Bandai Entertainment announced on October 12, 2000 that it would be publishing the series on DVD, itself dubbed into English by Ocean Productions. Bandai went on to announce that the series would be released in a chronological fashion, succeeded by Saber Marionette J to X. Scheduled for release in February 2001, in addition to the standard Japanese and English dubs, Bandai announced around August 7, 2000 that the DVD releases would also contain Spanish; dubbed by Alebrije Entertainment, broadcast by Animax Latin America and Locomotion where it was also known by the name Chica Marioneta J.

Anime House, a company situated in Cologne, released the series in German; while Beez, the European off-shot of Bandai Visual, handled distribution in France.

== Media ==
=== Manga ===
A few months before the release of the anime, a manga iteration of Saber Marionette J began to circulate in Kadokawa Shoten's Monthly Dragon Age written by series creator Satoru Akahori and illustrated by Yumisuke Kotoyoshi. The series ran from October 1996 to November 1999, being collected in five volumes by the company from January 1997 to December 1999. Besides its native release, Editora JBC, a Tokyo-based Portuguese publisher, announced on March 8, 2010, that it has secured the rights to the series.

In a similar fashion to the animated series, the Saber Marionette J manga was localized into other languages. Notably, Tokyopop announced in 2003 that it had acquired the publishing rights to the series and that the first volume would be released in July of that year. Madman Entertainment, an Australian publisher, additionally published the manga in Oceania from May 19, 2004, to March 5, 2005. Editorial Ivrea, an Argentina-based publishing company, published the series in Spanish.

=== Light novels ===
A total of 14 light novels were made about the series, written by Satoru Akahori and illustrated by Tsukasa Kotobuki. The books were printed by Fujimi Shobo between April 1995 and July 1, 1999.

=== Audio CDs ===
The complete soundtrack of Saber Marionette J was reproduced for distribution when the anime was still in production. The initial release, titled "Japones ginei shisyu sonoichi" (Japones Recitation Poem Collection 1)", was made on December 21, 1996 and contained 17 tracks by King Records. A sequel release, containing 24 tracks, was made on April 9, 1997.

Two audio dramas were made of the series. The first, released direct to commercial disc, was published from January 24 to May 22, 1995 as a four-disc set by King Records under their StarChild label, each containing 4 tracks with additional bonuses. These tracks would later be broadcast on October 21. The second audio drama was aired on TBS on Thursdays and was based on the aforementioned novels. Broadcasts were made from April 27 to July 3, 1997.

=== Game ===
Tom Create, a small Tokyo game developer, produced a fighting game of the series titled Saber Marionette J: Battle Sabers (セイバーマリオネットJ：バトルセイバーズ, Seibā Marionetto Jei: Batoru Seibazu), published by Bandai Visual on March 28, 1997 for the PlayStation. Featuring Lime, Cherry, Bloodberry, the Saber Dolls, and a new marionette name Apple, the player is able to fight against a CPU or, with another controller, a second player. At the beginning of each round, player's are also allowed to choose two special abilities to buff their characters. The game featured an alternate version of the anime opening and was released in a limited and regular edition, the former bundled with figurines and special edition portraits of the characters.

== Reception ==
Saber Marionette J was met with mostly positive reception. THEM Anime Reviews gave the series a 5 out of 5 stars, calling it "Top-notch animation, involving story and memorable characters make this one of the greats. If there was a flaw to be found here, it was too small to notice." Industry aggregator Mania.com editor Chris Beveridge rated each of the three North American releases a B, averaging a predictable story, an overall solid release, but that "Saber Marionette J was decent if unexceptional in total."

On Anime News Network, the show retains a median "Good" rating, averaging a 7 out of 10; the first VHS was also given a B+. Less favorable reviews criticized the cliche plot, character voices and less than crisp artwork.

== Footnotes ==
a. Luchs name is derived from the German spelling and pronunciation for lynx.
