= Yuri Shiratori =

Japanese voice actress and singer

- 白鳥 由里
- Born: August 20, 1968 (age 58); Kanagawa Prefecture, Japan
- Occupations: Voice actress, singer
- Years active: 1989–present
- Notable credit(s): Trapp Family Story as Maria Agathe Franziska 'Mitzi' von Trapp; Angelic Layer as Hatoko Kobayashi; Revolutionary Girl Utena as Nanami Kiryuu; Saber Marionette J as Cherry; YuYu Hakusho as Yukina; Hell Teacher: Jigoku Sensei Nube as Yukime

Yuri Shiratori (白鳥 由里, Shiratori Yuri; born August 20, 1968) is a Japanese voice actress and singer.

== Filmography ==
=== Anime ===
Year	Title	Role
1989	Madö King Granzört	Hilda
1989	Yawara!	Female student B
1990	Iczer Reborn	Nagisa Kasumi
1990	My Daddy Long Legs	Orphan B
1991	Chibi Maruko-chan	Machiko, Yuko Nomura
1991	Genji Tsūshin Agedama	Herself
1991	Holly the Ghost	Round-Round
1991	Marude Dameo	Momoko, Umeko
1991	Trapp Family Story	Maria von Trapp
1992	The Brave Fighter of Legend Da-Garn	Hotaru Sakurakoji
1992	The Bush Baby	Murphy
1992	Genki Bakuhatsu Ganbaruger	Chinatsu Yuuki
1992	Hime-chan's Ribbon	Aiko Nonohara
1992	Jeanie with the Light Brown Hair	Betty Lambert
1992	Kobo, the Li'l Rascal	Hanako
1992	Mama wa Shōgaku 4 Nensei	Eriko Tachibana
1992	YuYu Hakusho	Yukina, Pu
1993	Mega Man: Upon a Star	Akane Kobayashi
1993	Papuwa	Tezuka
1993	Please Save My Earth	Alice Sakaguchi
1993	Slam Dunk	Yoko Shimamura
1994	Magic Knight Rayearth	Mokona, Primera
1994	Mobile Fighter G Gundam	Cecile
1994	Tama and Friends	Emi (replacing Satoe Ayuhara)
1994	Tonde Burin	Karin Kokubu
1995	Hyper Doll	Shoko
1995	Iczer Girl Iczelion	Nagisa Kai
1995	Juuni Senshi Bakuretsu Eto Ranger	Little Red Riding Hood
1995	Mama Loves the Poyopoyo-Saurus	Hyouga Poyota
1995	Megami Paradise	Lilith
1995	Neighborhood Story	Yuka
1995	Wedding Peach	Reiko
1995	World Fairy Tale Series	Sleeping Beauty
1996	Hell Teacher: Jigoku Sensei Nube	Yukime
1996	The Legend of Zorro	Gina
1996	Midori no Makibaō	Beautiful
1996	Remi, Nobody's Girl	Sara
1996	Rurouni Kenshin	Sanjō Tsubame
1996	Saber Marionette	Cherry
1996	Saber Marionette J	Cherry
1996	Saint Tail	Miyuki
1996	Twin Signal	Elara
1996	YAT Anshin! Uchū Ryokō	Kaoru
1996	You're Under Arrest	Yasuyo Yamada
1997	Anime Ganbare Goemon	Rokudenashi
1997	Berserk	Charlotte
1997	Clamp School Detectives	Anita
1997	Hareluya II Boy	Shizuka Momiyama
1997	Haunted Junction	Nino
1997	Mashin Hero Wataru	Chilled
1997	Pokémon	Azumi, Fūko, Izuna, Namiko, Tsutsuji
1997	Revolutionary Girl Utena	Nanami Kiryu
1998	Bomberman B-Daman Bakugaiden	Ron Shirasagi
1998	Popolocrois	Kai, Narcia
1999	Arc the Lad II	Lia
1999	Great Teacher Onizuka	Megumi Asakura
1999	I'm Gonna Be An Angel!	Squid Noelle
1999	Monster Rancher	Mocchi
1999	Omishi Magical Theater: Risky Safety	Fazzy Serges
1999	Power Stone	Cassie
2000	Boys Be...	Aki Mizutani
2000	Brigadoon: Marin & Melan	Woman at the Ward Office
2000	The Candidate for Goddess	Tune Youg
2000	Descendants of Darkness	Puan Ruoye
2000	Doraemon: Nobita and the Legend of the Sun King	Robin
2000	Doraemon	Taro
2000	Love Hina	Mei Narusegawa
2000	Mon Colle Knights	Foal (Pegasus)
2000	Strange Dawn	Princess Alia
2001	A Little Snow Fairy Sugar	Snow User
2001	Angelic Layer	Hatoko Kobayashi
2001	Cosmo Warrior Zero	Helmatier
2001	Haré+Guu	Ame
2001	Najica Blitz Tactics	Ellis
2001	Project ARMS	Carol
2001	Slayers Premium	Ruma
2001	UFO Baby	Mengxiaolu Xiaomei
2002	Atashin'chi	Emi
2002	Ground Defense Force! Mao-chan	Kiku Ichimonji III
2002	Inuyasha	Koume
2002	Princess Tutu	Lilie
2003	Sonic X	Maria Robotnik
2004	Case Closed	Harumi Fukatsu, Maria Higashio, Mihiro Kuze
2004	Fafner in the Azure	Juvenile
2004	Kaiketsu Zorori	Alien Princess
2004	Melody of Oblivion	Flying Bunny
2005	Chibi Vampire	Elda Marker
2005	Negima! Magister Negi Magi	Sayo Aisaka
2005	Oku-sama wa Mahō Shōjo: Bewitched Agnes	Ururu and Nori
2005	Twin Princess of Wonder Planet	Bibin
2006	Hell Girl	Reiko Kurebayashi
2006	Hime-sama Goyōjin	Kode Mari
2006	Koi suru Tenshi Angelique	Angelique Limoges
2006	The Melancholy of Haruhi Suzumiya	Emiri Kimidori
2006	Negima!?	Sayo Aisaka
2006	Ōban Star-Racers	Para-dice
2006	Pokémon Ranger and the Temple of the Sea	Manaphy
2007	Kirarin Revolution	Misaki Shirahama
2007	Ojarumaru	Tenko
2007	Yasai no Yousei: N.Y. Salad	Brussels Sprouts
2008	Nijū Mensō no Musume	Tabata
2009	Gokujō!! Mecha Mote Iinchō	Himeka Hoshino
2016	Kamisama Minarai: Himitsu no Cocotama	Akane Saionji, Charlotte, Paline
2017	UQ Holder!	Sayo Aisaka
2024	Our Last Crusade or the Rise of a New World	Eight Apostles A

=== Video games ===
Year	Title	Role
1993	Jewel BEM Hunter Lime	Seo Mizuki
1993	Variable Geo	Kaori Yanase
1993	Ys IV: The Dawn of Ys	Lisa
1994	Megami Paradise	Lilith
1995	Astal	Leda
1995	Outlaws of the Lost Dynasty	Hu Sanniang
1996	Lightning Legend: Daigo no Daibouken	Yuki Shirogane
1996	Lunacy	Louise
1996	Quiz Nanairo Dreams	Megumi Morinaga
1996	Variable Geo	Kaori Yanase
1997	Eberouge	Noish Amalfi
1997	Lunar: Sanposuru Gakuen	Senia
1998	Angelique	Angelique
1998	Idol Janshi Suchie-Pai	Mayo Umeno
1998	Princess Quest	Millefeuille
1998	Thousand Arms	Mil Wind
1999	Ace Combat 3: Electrosphere	Rena Hirose
1999	Sword of the Berserk: Guts' Rage	Rita
1999	Valkyrie Profile	Shiho
2001	Sonic Adventure 2	Maria Robotnik
2002	Omoide ni Kawaru Kimi: Memories Off	Mifu Kashima
2004	Super Robot Wars MX	Aqua Centolm
2005	Shadow the Hedgehog	Maria Robotnik
2015	Return to PopoloCrois	Narcia
2024	Shadow Generations	Maria Robotnik

=== Dubbing ===
- Hot Wheels: AcceleRacers – Gelorum (Kathleen Barr)
- Hot Wheels: World Race – Gelorum (Kathleen Barr)
- The Raccoons – Lisa Raccoon (Lisa Lougheed)
- Thomas and the Magic Railroad – Young Tasha (Laura Bower)
