= Tomohiro Nishimura =

Japanese actor, singer-songwriter, and director (born 1961)

- 西村 朋紘
- Born: Tomohiro Nishimura (西村 智博); February 2, 1961 (age 65); Asahikawa, Hokkaido, Japan
- Occupations: Actor, voice actor, singer-songwriter, theatre director, sound director
- Years active: 1981–present
- Height: 167 cm (5 ft 6 in)
- Website: http://omosama.com/

Tomohiro Nishimura (西村 朋紘, Nishimura Tomohiro; born February 2, 1961) is a Japanese actor, voice actor, singer-songwriter, theatre director, and sound director. He used to be employed by the talent management firm 81 Produce, but today he is freelance. He is often confused with Tomomichi Nishimura.

Since 2003, Nishimura has been the representative of OMO Ltd., being involved in various activities as a sound director for games, OVAs, and CD dramas.

== Filmography ==
=== Television animation ===
- Urusei Yatsura (1981–1986) (Kotatsu Kitty)
- Itadakiman (1983) (Hatsuo)
- Zillion (1987) (Bō)
- Berserk (1997) (Corkus)
- Alice SOS (1998) (Namekuji-neko)
- Trigun (1998) (Midvalley the Hornfreak)
- Magic User's Club (1999) (Yoshito Yoshimoto)
- Baki the Grappler (2001) (Chiharu Shiba)
- I Love Bubu Chacha (2001) (Nick)
- Astro Boy: Mighty Atom (2003) (Jiomini)
- Gokusen (2004) (Principal Gonzō Shirakawa)
- Nerima Daikon Brothers (2006) (Attorney Kakuhama)
- Saru Get You -On Air- (2006) (Pipotron Red, Ukki White)
- Kaiji: Ultimate Survivor (2007) (Okabayashi)
- Juni Taisen (2017) (Michio Tsukui)

Unknown date

- Ayakashi Ayashi (Hanai Toraichi)
- Cats & Company (Hector)
- Corrector Yui (IR)
- Death Note (Matt/Mail Jeevas, Takuo Shibuimaru)
- Detective Conan (Director, Asakichi Yagura, Jiei Kariya, Takeshi Nezu, Jōji Narugawa)
- Digimon Frontier (Grottomon)
- Fushigi Mahou Fun Fun Pharmacy (Uomasa, Used Bookstore Owner, Summer Spirit)
- Futari wa Pretty Cure/Futari wa Pretty Cure Max Heart (Vice Principal Kometsuki)
- Hamtaro (Sabu)
- Haō Taikei Ryū Knight (Sarutobi)
- Harimogu Hārī (Takuya)
- High School! Kimengumi (Munaita Dan, Kurutsu Teru)
- Hunter × Hunter (Kiriko, Progressive, Seaquant)
- Kaleido Star (Simon Park)
- Karaoke Senshi Mike-jirō (Principal Doheta, mike goblin, Spielberger)
- Kindaichi Case Files (Yukio Nijigawa, Naoya Tateishi)
- Kinnikuman Nisei (Tel Tel Boy)
- Korokke! (Bavarois)
- Kuma no Pūtarō (Karaoke Monkey)
- Macross 7 (Gigile)
- Rockman EXE Beast (Nenji Rokushakudama)
- Rockman EXE Stream (Nenji Rokushakudama)
- Momotarō Densetsu (Kumagorō)
- Monster (Terrorist "Secretary")
- Nangoku Shōnen Papuwa-kun (Tanno-kun (second voice))
- Petite Princess Yucie (Balizan)
- Pokémon (Torigai)
- Pokémon: Advanced Generation (Professor Soraishi)
- Silk Road Shōnen Yūto (Arumajirō)
- Soreike! Anpanman (SLman (second voice))
- Tove Jasson no Tanoshii Mūmin Ikka (Busutafu)
- Yoroiden Samurai Troopers (Shu Rei Fuan)
- Rurouni Kenshin (Kaita)
- Yu-Gi-Oh! GX (Zure)

=== Original video animation (OVA) ===
- Haou Taikei Ryū Knight: Adeu's Legend (xxxx) (Sarutobi, Kazemaru)
- Inferious Wakusei Senshi Gaiden Condition Green (xxxx) (Edward T. McCragan)
- Lupin III: The Plot of the Fuma Clan (1987) (Policeman)
- Macross Plus (1994) (Yan Noiman)
- Saber Marionette (xxxx) (Hess)
- Twin Angels (1995) (Dekunobo)
- Samurai Troopers Gaiden (xxxx) (Shu Rei Fuan)
- Samurai Troopers: Legend of Kikoutei (xxxx) (Shu Rei Fuan)
- Samurai Troopers: Message (xxxx) (Shu Rei Fuan)
- Urotsukidōji (1987) (Amano Jyaku)
- Ultraman: Super Fighter Legend (1996) (Ultraman Ace and Gomora)
- The Hakkenden (1990) (Inukai Genpachi Nobumichi)
- Cosmo Warrior Zero (2001) (Tochirō)

=== Animated films ===
- Anpanman movie series (xxxx) (SLman (second voice), SLmanman, Hōtaiman, Super Kabidandan)
- Dorami-chan: Wow, The Kid Gang of Bandits (1991) (Chibisuke)
- Fatal Fury: The Motion Picture (1994) (Billy Kane)
- Konjiki no Gash Bell!!: 101 Banme no Mamono (2004) (Owl Demon)
- My Neighbor Totoro (1988) (Postal worker)

=== Tokusatsu ===
- Chouriki Sentai Ohranger (xxxx) (Cat Signal)
- Gekisou Sentai Carranger (xxxx) (ZZ Zeri)

=== Videogames ===
- Samurai Shodown: Warriors Rage (1999) (Haito Kanakura)
- Daemon X Machina (2019) (Klondike)

unknown date

- 3×3 Eyes: Kyūsei Kōshu (Haslett Hearn, Naparuba)
- 3×3 Eyes: Tenrin-Ō Genmu (Haslett Hearn)
- GioGio's Bizarre Adventure (Pesci, Ghiaccio)
- Ninety-Nine Nights (Levv)
- Kuma no Pūtarō: Sora wa Pink da! Zen'in Shūgō (Sore Damessu!) (Karaoke Monkey)
- Shadow Hearts: Covenant (Joachim Valentine)
- Shadow Hearts: From The New World (Joachim Valentine)

=== Live-action ===
- The Red Spectacles (Chinpira)

=== Dubbing roles ===
==== Live-action ====
- The Nutty Professor (Reggie Warrington (Dave Chappelle))

==== Animation ====
- Teenage Mutant Ninja Turtles (Mack)
- Tom and Jerry: The Magic Ring (Butch Alley Cat)
- Thomas & Friends (Freddie)
