= Akiko Hiramatsu =

Japanese voice actress (born 1967)

- 平松 晶子
- Born: August 31, 1967 (age 59); Tokyo, Japan
- Occupation: Voice actress
- Years active: 1986–present
- Agent: Ken Production
- Notable credits: Bubblegum Crisis as Nene Romanova You're Under Arrest as Miyuki Kobayakawa; Slam Dunk as Haruko Akagi; Tales of Destiny 2 as Harold Berselius; Super Doll Licca chan as Misty
- Height: 156 cm (5 ft 1 in)

Akiko Hiramatsu (平松 晶子, Hiramatsu Akiko; born August 31, 1967) is a Japanese voice actress affiliated with Ken Production.

== Filmography ==
=== Anime ===
Year	Series	Role	Notes	Source
1987	Metal Armor Dragonar	Rose Patterson		
1987	Zillion	Jill	Ep. 22	
1990	108 Ward Inside and Out: Make-Up Artist	Hage		
1991	Trapp Family Story	Annie		
1991	Holly the Ghost	Berber, Majobeti		
1991	Future GPX Cyber Formula	Elena		
1991	Dear Brother	Student	Ep. 29	
1991	Kinnikuman: Kinnikusei Ōi Sōdatsu-hen	Natsuko Shouno, Robert, Ashuraman (young)		
1992	Sailor Moon	Castor	Ep. 21	
1992	Chōdendō Robo Tetsujin 28-go FX	Shiori		
1992	Rainbow Samurai	Margaret Eric		
1992	Mikan Enikki	Tom Kusanagi		
1993	Pretty Soldier Sailor Moon R	Calaveras		
1993	Rocky Rackat!	Miki Konoha		
1993	Ghost Sweeper Mikami	Mannequin	Ep. 33	
1993	Slam Dunk	Haruko Akagi		
1994	Shirayuki Hime no Densetsu	Pokke		
1994	Omakase Scrappers	Shacky		
1995	Ninku	Mekira Ninku		
1995	Pretty Soldier Sailor Moon SuperS	Dokanko	Ep. 130	
1995	Neon Genesis Evangelion	TV Announcer, NERV Personnel		
1995	Kaito Saint Tail	Michiru		
1996	Rurouni Kenshin: Meiji Swordsman Romantic Story	Tsubaki		
1996	Meiken Lassie	Serra		
1996	Pretty Soldier Sailor Moon Sailor Stars	Reiko Kanagawa/Sailor Gamer	Ep. 191	
1996	B'tX	Young Feng Raffine		
1996	Saber Marionette J	Bloodberry		
1996	You're Under Arrest	Miyuki Kobayakawa		
1996	YAT Anshin! Uchu Ryokou	Doris Anderson		
1997	Cutey Honey Flash	Seira Hazuki, Misty Honey		
1997	Haunted Junction	Yamiko	Ep. 6	
1997	The File of Young Kindaichi	Agatha	Ep. 74	
1997	Flame of Recca	Fuuko Kirisawa		
1997	Virus Buster Serge	Yuirin		
1998	All Purpose Cultural Cat Girl	Hidariko, Pretty Kyoko		
1998	Silent Möbius	Lum Cheng	Ep. 15, 17–26	
1998	Saber Marionette J to X	Bloodberry		
1998	Super Doll Licca-chan	Misty		
1999	Chiisana Kyojin Microman	Arden Purple		
1999	Legend of Himiko	Shino		
1999	Dai-Guard	Ibuki Momoi		
1999	Jibaku-kun	Live		
1999	Weekly Story Land	Ayako Mizuno		
2000	Hero Hero-kun	Nikoniko Sensei		
2001	Zoids/ZERO	Mary Champ		
2001	Rune Soldier	Lily		
2001	The SoulTaker	Yui Kirihara		
2001	Geneshaft	Julia Seido		
2001	You're Under Arrest	Miyuki Kobayakawa		
2001	Hanaukyo Maid Team	Konoe Tsurugi		
2001	Shaman King	Nyorai		
2001	Captain Kuppa	Vanilla		
2001	Sugar: A Little Snow Fairy	Ms. Hanna, Cinnamon		
2001	Hellsing	Helena		
2002	Full Metal Panic!	Youko Wakana		
2002	RahXephon	Young Itsuki Kisaragi		
2002	.hack//SIGN	BT		
2002	Azumanga Daioh	Yukari Tanizaki		
2002	The Twelve Kingdoms	Seishu		
2002	Ai Yori Aoshi	Miyabi Kagurazaki		
2002	ATASHIn'CHI	Ai Sakata		
2002	Princess Tutu	Edel		
2002	Petite Princess Yucie	Lena		
2002	Ghost in the Shell: Stand Alone Complex	Saori Tsujisaki		
2002	Pokémon: Advanced Generation	Musashi	Ep. 85-92	
2003	Stratos 4	Chizuru Kubo		
2003	Someday's Dreamers	Milinda		
2003	E's Otherwise	Maria, Aniel		
2003	Pluster World	Princess Shanta		
2003	Astro Boy: Mighty Atom	Epsilon		
2003	Tantei Gakuen Q	Mayumi Ohtori		
2003	Full Metal Panic? Fumoffu	Youko Wakana		
2003	Ai Yori Aoshi ~Enishi~	Miyabi Kagurazaki		
2004	Daphne in the Brilliant Blue	Mieko Mizuki		
2004	Kenran Butōsai: The Mars Daybreak	Selena Knightly		
2004	Legendz: Yomigaeru Ryuuou Densetsu	King Wrapper		
2004	Hanaukyo Maid Team: La Verite	Konoe Tsurugi		
2004	Agatha Christie no Meitantei Poirot to Marple	Griselda, Mrs. Willard, Scene, Kidder		
2004	Uta∽Kata	Shiho Shirasaka		
2004	Meine Liebe	Ishtar	Ep. 8	
2004	Sgt. Frog	Aki Hinata, Giroro (child), Akina Hinata (young), Char Alien, Blob, TV Announcer		
2005	Bleach	Kūkaku Shiba		
2005	Jinki: Extend	Shiba		
2005	Best Student Council	Wakana Hirata		
2005	Tsubasa Chronicle	Arashi		
2005	Oku-sama wa Mahō Shōjo: Bewitched Agnes	Nori Mitsugi		
2005	Kotenkotenko	Creek		
2005	Major	Shouya's classmate		
2006	Nana	Natsuko Komatsu		
2006	.hack//Roots	Bordeaux		
2006	Sasami: Magical Girls Club	Washu Kozuka		
2006	Binbou Shimai Monogatari	Ranko Saegusa		
2006	Pumpkin Scissors	Webner		
2006	Hell Girl: Two Mirrors	Rina Takeda		
2007	Nodame Cantabile	Kaori Etou		
2007	CODE-E	Mitsuki Ebihara		
2007	You're Under Arrest: Full Throttle	Miyuki Kobayakawa		
2008	Negibōzu no Asatarō	Okoi Biwano		
2009	Fresh Pretty Cure	Giuliano		
2009	Hayate the Combat Butler!!	Hatsuho Saginomiya		
2009	Element Hunters	Ann Karas		
2010	A Certain Magical Index	Vento of the Front		
2011	Nichijou	Osamu		
2011	The IDOLM@STER	Chigusa Kisaragi		
2012	From the New World	False Minoshiro		
2012	Hayate the Combat Butler: Cuties	Hatsuho Saginomiya		
2013	The Severing Crime Edge	Mother Kind Regards		
2013	Hayate the Combat Butler: Cuties	Hatsuho Saginomiya		
2015	Non Non Biyori	Yukiko Koshigaya		
2016	She and Her Cat: Everything Flows	Mother		
2017	Two Car	Yurimama		
2018	Sword Art Online: Alicization	Azurica		
2020	My Next Life as a Villainess: All Routes Lead to Doom!	Katarina's Mother		

==== OVA ====
Year	Title	Role	Source
1987	Bubblegum Crisis	Nene Romanova	
1991	Bubblegum Crash	Nene Romanova	
1991	Exper Zenon	Hiroko	
1992	All Purpose Cultural Cat Girl	Kyoko	
1993	Moldiver	Mao Shirase	
1994	Otaku no Seiza	Min	
1994	You're Under Arrest	Miyuki Kobayakawa	
2009	DARKER THAN BLACK - Kuro no Keiyakusha: Gaiden	Amber look-alike	
2014	Hayate the Combat Butler	Min	

==== Films ====
Year	Title	Role	Source
1988	My Neighbor Totoro	Bus conductor	
1994	Slam Dunk	Haruko Akagi	
1994	Slam Dunk: Zenkoku Seiha da! Sakuragi Hanamichi	Haruko Akagi	
1995	Slam Dunk: Shōhoku Saidai no Kiki! Moero Sakuragi Hanamichi	Haruko Akagi	
1995	Slam Dunk: Hoero Basketman Tamashii! Hanamichi to Rukawa no Atsuki Natsu	Haruko Akagi	
1996	Dragon Quest Saga: Emblem of Roto	Arus	
1996	Slayers Return	Selena Biatz	
1999	You're Under Arrest THE MOVIE	Miyuki Kobayakawa	
1999	Pokémon: The Movie 2000	Furūra/Melody	
1999	Re-Birthday	Young Shizuyo	
1999	Daigekisen! Microman VS Saikyō Senshi Gorgon	Arden Purple	
1999	Super Doll Licca-chan: Licca-chan Zettai Zetsumei! Doll Knights no Kiseki	Giize	
2002	A Tree of Palme	Palme	
2006-2026	Sgt. Frog	Aki Hinata	
2016	A Silent Voice	Yaeko Nishimiya	
2021	Aria the Benedizione	Airi S. Granzchesta	

=== Video games ===
Year	Series	Role	Source
1993	Langrisser: Hikari no Matsuei	Chris	
1993	Yumimi Mix	Yumimi Yoshizawa	
1995	Dōkyūsei	Masumi Hori	
1996	Bishojo Variety Game: Rapyulus Panic	Doctor J	
1996	Der Langrisser FX	Rushirisu	
1996	Dōkyūsei if	Masumi Hori	
1996	Building Crash	Toshimasanae	
1997	Cross Romance: Koi to Mahjong to Hanafuda to	Mayumi Katsura	
1997	Saber Marionette J: Battle Sabers	Bloodberry	
1997	Langrisser I & II	Rushirisu	
1997	My Dream: On Air ga Matenakute	Aya Takai	
1998	Double Cast	Mizuki Akasaka, Shiho Akasaka	
1998	Misaki Aggressive!	Ayano Kiryu	
1998	6 Inch My Darling	Pym	
1999	Himiko-Den: Renge	Shino	
1999	Yuukyuu no Eden	Lady Bird Rouge	
1993	Nekketsu Seisyun Nikki 2	Ran Hibiki	
2000	Project Justice	Ran Hibiki	
2001	Kaen Seibo: The Virgin on Megiddo	Manase Kitagawa	
2002	Azumanga Donjara Daioh	Yukari Tanizaki	
2002	Zoids VS.	Thita Breeze	
2002	Tales of Destiny 2	Harold Belselius	
2002	Yukigatari	Chitose Aoyagi	
2003	Ai Yori Aoshi	Miyabi Kagurazaki	
2003	Zoids VS. II	Marie, Thita Breeze	
2004	Flame of Recca Final Burning	Fuuki Kirisawa	
2004	Sgt. Frog Meromero Battle Royal	Aki Hinata	
2005	Best Student Council	Wakana Hirata	
2005	Sgt. Frog Meromero Battle Royal Z	Aki Hinata	
2006	.hack//G.U.	Gaspar, Bordeaux	
2006	Fuuraiki	Tamae Takizawa	
2006	.hack//G.U. Vol. 2: Reminisce	Bordeaux	
2006	Tales of the World: Radiant Mythology	Harold Belselius	
2007	Nodame Cantabile	Kaori Eto	
2009	Tales of the World: Radiant Mythology 2	Harold Belselius	
2009	Tales of VS.	Harold Belselius	
2011	Tales of the World: Radiant Mythology 3	Harold Belselius	

=== Dubbing ===
- Bootmen (Linda (Sophie Lee))
- Clueless (Tai Frasier (Brittany Murphy))
