= Urara Takano =

Japanese actress, voice actress and narrator (1961-)

- 高乃 麗
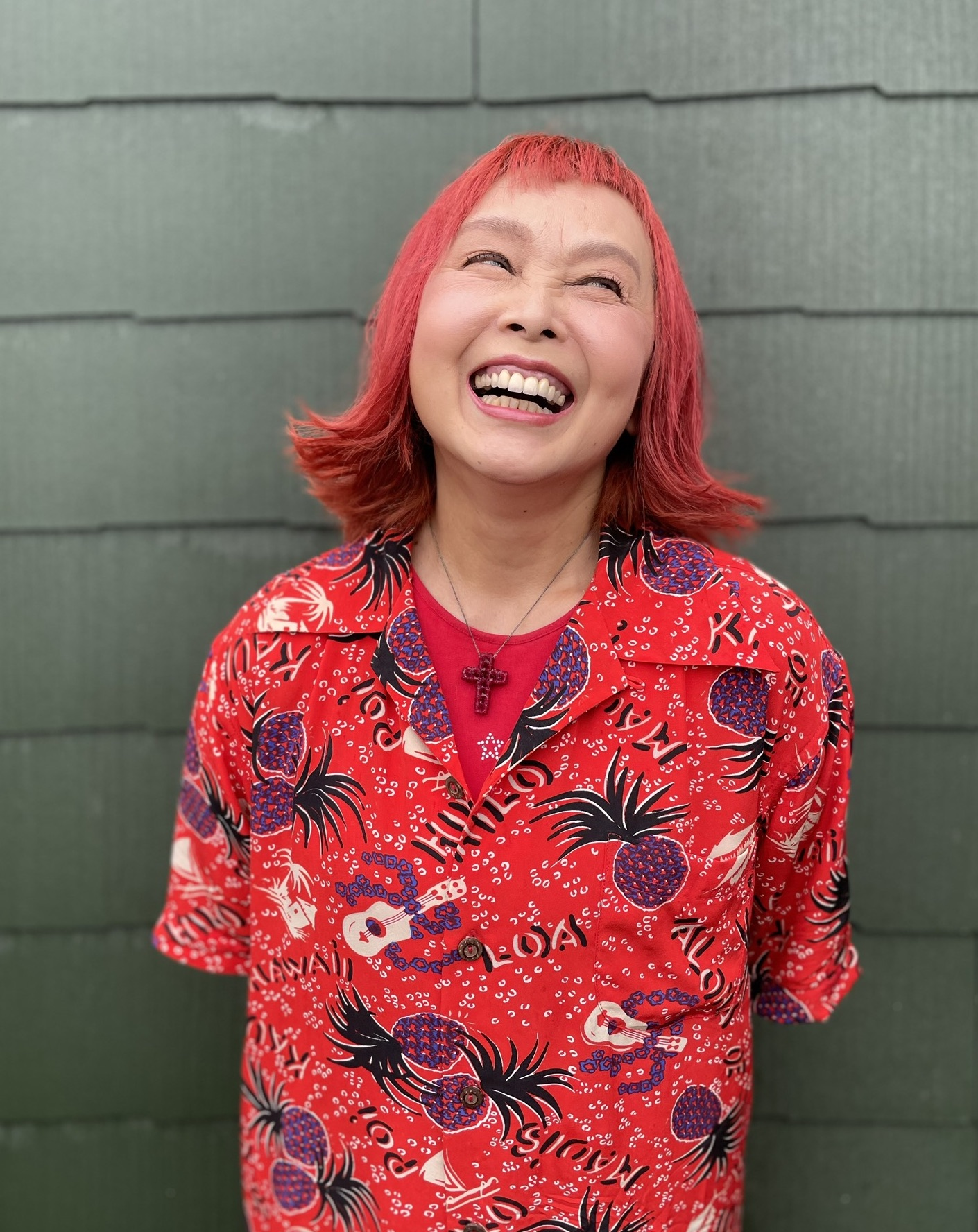
- Born: Hisako Takayama (高山 ひさ子); August 16, 1961 (age 65); Tōgane, Chiba Prefecture, Japan
- Occupations: Actress; voice actress; narrator
- Years active: 1986–present
- Agent: REMAX
- Notable work: Sakura Wars as Maria Tachibana
- Height: 158 cm (5 ft 2 in)
- Children: Anna Kirie (daughter)
- Website: uraralove.com

Hisako Takayama (高山 ひさ子, Takayama Hisako; born August 16, 1961), known by her stage name Urara Takano (高乃 麗, Takano Urara), is a Japanese actress, voice actress, and narrator from Togane, Chiba. She is currently affiliated with and representative of REMAX. Her most prominent role has been in the Sakura Wars video game franchise, where she voices Maria Tachibana. Other major roles include Ryo Takaba in Bakusō Kyōdai Let's & Go!!, Marller in Oh My Goddess!, Tiger in Saber Marionette J, Musashi Kazama in Grander Musashi, Kai Hiwatari in Beyblade, and Veffidas Feaze in Macross 7. She is the mother of actress and director Anna Kirie (桐江 杏奈, Kirie Anna).

== Filmography ==
=== Anime ===
- After War Gundam X (Drasso)
- Animal Yokochō (Shimako Shima)
- Anime Himitsu no Hanazono (Jim)
- Bakusō Kyōdai Let's & Go!! (Ryou Takaba)
- Bakuten Shoot Beyblade (Kai Hiwatari)
- The Brave Fighter of Legend Da-Garn (Yancha)
- Captain Tsubasa: Road to 2002 (Ryo Ishizaki)
- Case Closed (Hiroki, Kazumi Takenaka, Mari Terahara)
- Crash B-Daman (Kodoh Kuraki)
- Darker than Black (Alma)
- Diamond Daydreams (Shoko Saibara)
- Ehrgeiz (Ken)
- Fate/Extra Last Encore (Francis Drake)
- Gall Force 2: Destruction (Lorelei Commanders)
- Gall Force: The Revolution (Wizael)
- Grander Musashi (Musashi Kazama)
- HeartCatch PreCure! (Sasorina)
- Hetalia: Axis Powers (Belarus)
- Human Crossing (Deputy Warden)
- Hunter × Hunter (Illumi Zoldyck, Ging Freecss (child))
- Jang Geum's Dream (Yoon Yeong Ro)
- Kimagure Orange Road (Shuri Anzai)
- Komi Can't Communicate (Shokola)
- Macross 7 (Veffidas Feaze, Akiko Hojo)
- Magical Circle Guru Guru (Gipple)
- Moomin (Flora)
- Nekketsu Saikyō Go-Saurer (Kenichi Minezaki)
- Oh My Goddess! (Marller)
- One Piece (Joy Boy)
- Paradise Kiss (Risa)
- Pokémon (Raichu)
- Romeo and the Black Brothers (Antonio)
- Saber Marionette (Tiger)
- Sakura Wars (Maria Tachibana)
- Simoun (Wauf)
- Sword Gai: The Animation (Yasuko Tanaka)
- The Brave Fighter of Legend Da-Garn (Yanchar)
- Twilight of the Dark Master (Chen Long)
- Turn A Gundam (Cancer Kafuka)
- Yu-Gi-Oh! Duel Monsters (Insector Haga)
- YuYu Hakusho (Kaisei Sato)
- Zatch Bell! (Zeno)
- Zenshu (Naomi)

=== Anime films and OVAs ===
- Beyblade: Fierce Battle (Kai Hiwatari)
- Bubblegum Crisis (Kate Madigan)
- Final Fantasy: Legend of the Crystals (Rouge's subordinate)
- Iczer Reborn as Insect
- Mega Man: Upon a Star (Proto Man)
- Naruto the Movie: Legend of the Stone of Gelel (Fugai)
- One Piece: Defeat Him! The Pirate Ganzack! (Monkey D. Luffy)
- Saber Marionette R (Edge)
- Slayers: The Book of Spells (Old Woman, Children)
- The Story of Fifteen Boys (Donovan)

=== Video games ===
- Cyberbots: Full Metal Madness (Mary Miyabi)
- Devil May Cry 4 (Echidna)
- Fate/Extella Link (Francis Drake)
- Fate/Extra (Francis Drake)
- Fate/Grand Order (Francis Drake, Billy the Kid)
- The Granstream Saga (Laramee Restalia)
- Gunparade March (Kaori Tashiro)
- Horizon Forbidden West (GAIA)
- James Bond 007: Everything or Nothing (Serena St. Germaine)
- Kingdom Hearts 3D: Dream Drop Distance (Esmeralda)
- Kingdom Hearts III (Tia Dalma)
- SaGa: Scarlet Grace (Irene)
- Sakura Wars series (Maria Tachibana)
- Sega Ages: Dragon Force (Junorn)
- Super Robot Wars (Rejiane)
- Sonic Shuffle (Void)
- Valkyrie Profile (Jayle)
- Yu-Gi-Oh! Cross Duel (Insector Haga)
- Yu-Gi-Oh! Duel Links (Insector Haga)
- Yu-Gi-Oh! Duel Monsters Saikyo Card Battle (Insector Haga)

=== Dubbing roles ===
==== Live-action ====
- Carla Gugino
  - Spy Kids, Ingrid Cortez
  - Spy Kids 2: The Island of Lost Dreams, Ingrid Cortez
  - Spy Kids 3-D: Game Over, Ingrid Cortez
  - Night at the Museum, Rebecca Hutman
  - Watchmen, Silk Spectre
  - Mr. Popper's Penguins, Amanda Popper
- Helena Bonham Carter
  - Fight Club, Marla Singer
  - Harry Potter film series, Bellatrix Lestrange
  - Dark Shadows, Dr. Julia Hoffman
  - Ocean's 8, Rose Weil
  - Enola Holmes, Eudoria Holmes
- Queen Latifah
  - Bringing Down the House, Charlene Morton
  - Chicago, Matron "Mama" Morton
  - The Dilemma, Susan Warner
  - Just Wright, Leslie Wright
- Birds of Prey, Renee Montoya (Rosie Perez)
- The Brave One, Erica Bain (Jodie Foster)
- Chicago Med, Maggie Lockwood (Marlyne Barrett)
- Cold Mountain (Ruby (Renée Zellweger))
- Conviction, Abra Rice (Minnie Driver)
- DOA: Dead or Alive, Tina Armstrong (Jaime Pressly)
- Ed Wood, Dolores Fuller (Sarah Jessica Parker)
- ER, Sandy Lopez (Lisa Vidal)
- Friends, Kristen Lang (Gabrielle Union)
- Fun Size, Joy DeSantis (Chelsea Handler)
- Girls of the Sun, Mathilde (Emmanuelle Bercot)
- Grey's Anatomy, Dr. Bailey (Chandra Wilson)
- The Haunting, Eleanor "Nell" Vance (Lili Taylor)
- High Crimes, Jackie Grimaldi (Amanda Peet)
- Hollywoodland, Leonore Lemmon (Robin Tunney)
- Idiocracy, Rita (Maya Rudolph)
- IF, Ally (Maya Rudolph)
- The League of Extraordinary Gentlemen, Mina Harker (Peta Wilson)
- Lethal Weapon, Trish Murtaugh (Keesha Sharp)
- The Little Mermaid, Scuttle (Awkwafina)
- Marmaduke, Mazie (Emma Stone)
- Miami Vice, Trudy Joplin (Naomie Harris)
- Monster Hunt, Ying (Sandra Ng)
- Mrs. America, Shirley Chisholm (Uzo Aduba)
- Pirates of the Caribbean film series (Tia Dalma (Naomie Harris))
- Popstar: Never Stop Never Stopping, Mariah Carey
- The Rebound, Laura (Lynn Whitfield)
- Star Trek: Picard, Rafaella "Raffi" Musiker (Michelle Hurd)
- Talk to Her, Lydia González (Rosario Flores)
- Venom, Maria (Melora Walters)
- Where the Wild Things Are, Connie (Catherine Keener)
- Wolfe, DCI Betsy Chambers (Christine Tremarco)

==== Animation ====
- Chuggington, Decka
- A Goofy Movie, P.J.
- Cinderella, Anastasia Tremaine
- Home, Lucy Tucci
- Luca, Daniela Paguro
- Madagascar 3: Europe's Most Wanted, Chantel DuBois
- Raya and the Last Dragon, Sisu
- The Hunchback of Notre Dame II, Esmeralda
