= Yuka Imai =

Japanese voice actress (born 1970)

- 今井 由香
- Born: September 19, 1970 (age 55); Atami, Shizuoka, Japan
- Occupation: Voice actress
- Years active: 1994–2018
- Agent: Atomic Monkey
- Height: 161 cm (5 ft 3 in)
- Children: 1

Yuka Imai (今井 由香, Imai Yuka; born September 19, 1970) is a Japanese former voice actress who was previously represented by Gekidan Moonlight and by Atomic Monkey at the time of her retirement. She was born in Atami, Shizuoka. On August 30, 2018, Imai announced her retirement from voice acting, which she attributed to personal reasons.

== Filmography ==
=== Anime ===
Year	Title	Role	Notes	Ref.
1994	Magic Knight Rayearth	Mira		
1995	Legend of the Angel of Love, Wedding Peach	Scarlet O'Hara/Angel Salvia		
1995	Mobile Suit Gundam Wing	Additional voices		
1996	Detective Conan	Madoka Saotome		
1996	Mobile Suit Gundam: The 08th MS Team	Navigator		
1996	Burn Up W	Rio Kinezono		
1996	Apocalypse Zero	Hiroko Uchiyama	Ep. 1	
1996	Bakusō Kyōdai Let's & Go!!	Kai Okita		
1997	Burn Up Excess	Rio Kinezono		
1997	VS Knight Ramune & 40 Fire	Drum, Electone		
1997	Maze	Ranchiki		
1997	El Hazard 2: The Magnificent World	Kalia		
1998	Geobreeders	Eiko Rando		
1998–1999	Saber Marionette J to X	Otaru Mamiya		
1999	Crest of the Stars	Jinto		
1999	Revolutionary Girl Utena	Wakaba Shinohara		
1999	Martian Successor Nadesico: The Motion Picture – Prince of Darkness	Jyunko Mizuhara		
1999	Now and Then, Here and There	Nabuca		
1999	Magical DoReMi	Miss Yuki/Queen of the Witch World		
1999–2001	Excel Saga	Misaki Matsuya		
2000	Boys Be...	Shoko Sayama	Eps. 8, 13	
2000	Mon Colle Knights	Guko		
2000	Now and Then, Here and There	Nabuca		
2000	One Piece	Tobio		
2000	Descendants of Darkness	Maria Won		
2001	Fruits Basket	Arisa Uotani, young Akito Sohma		
2001	Final Fantasy: Unlimited	Yu Hayakawa		
2001	Puni Puni Poemy	Futaba Aasu		
2001–2002	Digimon Tamers	Renamon, Alice McCoy, Hata Seiko, Makino Rumiko		
2003	Peacemaker Kurogane	Suzu Kitamura		
2003–2004	Di Gi Charat Nyo!	Look-Alike of Akari Usada		
2003–2006	Zatch Bell!	Lori		
2005	Mushishi	Nagi	Ep. 6	
2005	Banner of the Stars	Jinto		
2006	Oh My Goddess!	Chihiro Fujimi		
2006	PreCure Splash Star	Kaoru Kiryuu	Ep. 14-19 only	
2008–2010	Duel Masters	Rekuta Kadoko		
2009–2010	Fresh Pretty Cure!	Queen of the Mekurumeku Kingdom		
2011	Suite PreCure	Misori Minamino		
2011	Uta no Prince-sama Maji Love 1000%	Tomochika Shibuya	Season 1	
2012–2013	Smile PreCure!	Forest of Girl		
2013–2014	DokiDoki! PreCure	Ai, Marie Ange		
2013	DokiDoki! Precure the Movie: Mana's Getting Married!!? The Dress of Hope Tied to the Future	Ai		
2013	Uta no Prince-sama Maji Love 2000%	Tomochika Shibuya	1 ep.	
2014	Pretty Cure All Stars New Stage 3: Eternal Friends	Ai		
2015	Uta no Prince-sama Maji Love Revolutions	Tomochika Shibuya		
2017	Ojarumaru	Hoshiemon Hiraki (Young); Mariko Juumonji; Nozomi; Otome-sensei (Season 3+); Sayuri Tamura (Young); Warashi; Yuri Tanabe		

=== Video games ===
Year	Title	Role	Notes	Ref.
1997	Kurumi Miracle	Kurumi		
1997	Tales of Destiny	Rutee Katrea		
1999	Galerians	Rita		
2001	Eithea	Yuka Maysuoka		
2002	Mega Man Zero	Fairy Leviathan		
2002	Robot Alchemic Drive	Ellen Bullnose		
2002	Tales of Destiny 2	Rutee Katrea		
2004	Shadow Hearts: Covenant	Anastasia Romanov		
2004	Growlanser II: The Sense of Justice	Wein Cruz		
2005	Namco × Capcom	Rutee Katrea, Lilith Aensland		
2006	Final Fantasy XII	Larsa Solidor		
2006	Mega Man ZX	Model L, Tulip, Leonardo		
2006	Tales of the World: Radiant Mythology	Rutee Katrea		
2009	Kazoku Keikaku	Jun Ogawara, Kei Hisami	Credited as Junko Sugisawa	
2017	Tales of the Rays	Rutee Katrea		

=== Other ===
- Final Fantasy Tactics Advance (2003 radio adaptation) - Marche Radiuju
