= NG Knight Ramune & 40 =

Japanese anime television series

NG騎士ラムネ&40 (Enujī Naito Ramune to Fōtī)
- Genre: Isekai, Mecha, Comedy
- Anime television series
- Directed by: Hiroshi Negishi
- Written by: Brother Noppo
- Music by: Tadashige Matsui; Tetsushi Ryū
- Studio: Ashi Productions
- Licensed by: NA: Discotek Media
- Original network: TXN (TV Tokyo)
- Original run: April 6, 1990 – January 4, 1991
- Episodes: 38
- Original video animation

NG Knight Ramune & 40 EX/DX
- Directed by: Koji Masunari (EX); Naori Hiraki (DX)
- Written by: Satoru Akahori
- Music by: Tadashige Matsui; Tetsushi Ryū; Akira Odakura
- Studio: Ashi Productions
- Licensed by: NA: Discotek Media
- Released: July 21, 1991 – September 22, 1993
- Episodes: 6
- Sequels
- VS Knight Ramune & 40 Fire; Knights of Ramune

NG Knight Ramune & 40 (NG騎士ラムネ&40, Enujī Naito Ramune to Fōtī) is a Japanese anime television series of 1990. It was one of the Ramune group of television shows and OVAs, and the "NG" in the title stands for "new generation". In all there were 3 OVA series (NG Knight Ramune & 40 EX, NG Knight Ramune & 40 DX, VS Knight Ramune & 40 Fresh) and a sequel anime television series (VS Knight Ramune & 40 Fire). The original concept for the show was developed by Takehiko Ito, much of the story was written by Takao Koyama and Satoru Akahori (collectively credited as Brother Noppo), and the mecha design was done by Rei Nakahara. All anime and OVA in the series were produced by Starchild Records, and the show was broadcast on TV Tokyo from April 6, 1990, to January 4, 1991. On December 12, 2019, it was announced that Discotek Media has acquired license for North America. This include the anime, and the OVAs. The anime and the OVAs has been made available for streaming on Crunchyroll for North American viewers.

The main storyline of the series involves a boy named Ramune Baba who is sucked into the video game "King Sccasher". Ramune is a blood relative of the hero "Ramuness", and in the program he is destined to save the world from the evil Don Harumage. "Ramune" is the name of a popular, lemon-flavored Japanese carbonated drink, and most character names in the series are based on drinks, such as the character Milk. The name "Scassher" is based on the name of a competitor to Ramune, namely "Lemon Squash", a drink not franchised in America whose name is based on that of "Orange Crush", which is. This show is not related to the anime series Ramune of 2005.

== Characters ==
- Baba Ramune – (Voiced by Takeshi Kusao) He is a 10-year-old boy who loves to play video-games. Most of the time his games get the best of his grades. He has a good heart in general but isn't too considerate of other peoples feelings. Ramune claims to not being a pervert in several episodes, though during his time at hot-springs he can't help but stare with his eyes wide open. He usually finds himself saying things like "ORE WA MOREZUNI HAZUKASHI!!" (I am very embarrassed right now!!) or "Ore wa morezuni odorote ii ru" (I am very surprised right now). He says the action and "Right now" follows after. He has a son in VS Knight Ramune & 40 Fire named Lamunade who follows the same fate as him. His love interest is Milk.
- Princess Milk – (Voiced by Chisa Yokoyama) A "cute" girl, that comes from the Arara Kingdom, she has elvish ears. She is forceful, and has a one track mind. She's friendly to people, but quite arrogant at times (mostly around Cocoa) and often hungry. She's the one who takes Ramune to their world. She is one of the 3 Maidens of Arara. Milk becomes Ramune's wife in VS Knight Ramune & 40 Fire. She birth at December 27, 1975, while her blood type is O.
- Cocoa – (Voiced by Sakiko Tamagawa) Milk's older sister, who is rather dotty and not too confident, she is quite adept in STEM and speaks very slowly. She is smart and is the one to get them around the world. In early episodes, Ramune goes wide-eyed whenever she takes off her glasses. She is also one of the 3 Maidens.
- Tama-Q – (Voiced by Chie Koujiro) A hand sized advisor robot that can summon the guardian knights if Ramune drop coins into the slot on his head. "Tama-kyuu" is the Japanese word for cue-ball.
- Da Cider – (Voiced by Kazuki Yao) Minion of Don Harumage. He actually bears more of a comic relief role during the series. Near the middle of the series, Da Cider realized he was brainwashed by Don Harumage and becomes one of the good guys as destined, but still maintains sort of a villainous image. Da Cider is incredibly stubborn and arrogant; he'll always be the one getting in fights with Ramune.
- Leska (Café au Lait) – (Voiced by Naoko Matsui) Da Cider's lover and partner, she seems to almost never pay attention to anything, only interested in being fashionable, would probably be considered as the sex symbol of the show. She shows affection towards Da Cider when she kisses him near the last episode. She is actually one of the 3 Maidens, and the older sister of Cocoa and Milk brainwashed by Don Harumage.
- Heavy Meta-Ko – (Voiced by TARAKO) A little yellow snake adviser robot that lives in Da Cider's shoulder pads and in love with Da Cider. He can summon the guardian knight, Queen Cideron, if Da Cider plays his snake-charming flute.

== Story ==
The story revolves around a boy named Ramune, who loves to play video games. After an embarrassing day of school, Ramune returns home, but on his way he sees what looks like a match girl having trouble explaining that she isn't selling matches, she's selling a video game. So he buys one and easily convinces the other people to buy one as well.

The girl mysteriously disappears after Ramune asks what kind of game it is, as the game was simply entitled "King Squasher". Upon returning home he immediately turned on the TV to play it, staying up until midnight until he finally beats the game.

The girl that sold him the game came out of the TV and announced her name was Milk, and that Ramune is the blood relative of the hero Ramuness, and he is destined to save the Hara-Hara World from the evil Don Harumage. And without question Ramune is dragged into their world where he then acquires Tama-Q, an advisor robot that can turn him into Ramuness, so he can use the guardian knight, King Squasher. With this he is now ready to fight Don Harumage in order to save the world.

== Episodes ==
There are 38 episodes in the series dating from 1990 to 1991.

1. Bang! The Resurrection of King Squasher
2. The Power of Justice! The Saint Bomb
3. Pokkin City is Starving!
4. Hahaha! The Laughter Fan of Mount Gokuroo
5. The Storm of Trivia on the Great Wall
6. Hot Blood!? Kankan Village is Hot Hot Hot!
7. Pop! Flowers Are Blooming on Heads Along the River Nyile!
8. We're Lost! Lost in the Horramid!
9. Gear City is Full of Wind-Up Springs
10. What? We're Half Asleep, Half Asleep, and Then We're on the Sea
11. Hic! Beware of the Juice of Truth
12. Dragonpalace Village Has Elderly Power?
13. Is it OK to Double-Double?
14. The Grand Entrance of Queen Cideron!
15. Kamekameka! The Great of Hawaii
16. Run Ramuness! The Traps in the Forest of Fairy Tales
17. Who is the Pretty Girl? Lesqua Versus Cocoa
18. Shiver! The Counterattack of Da Cider
19. Good Luck! Milk's Lullabye
20. We Found Annamonkonna Gate!
21. Shine! The Guardian Knight Contest
22. It's the Greatest! Tama-Q, This is Love!
23. The Legend of Ramuness: Truth or Deception?
24. Storming Into Hoy-Hoy Castle, We Are the Soldiers of Love!
25. The Beauty of Victory! The Holy Power of the Three Maidens
26. His Sacrificial Counterattack; the Fall of Da Cider!
27. The Collapse of Hoy-Hoy Castle! Farewell Tama-Q
28. It's Not Over! The Destroyer Knights Appear
29. Heavy Metal-ko: The Ballad of Betrayal
30. Do You Bet Your Life to a Proxy War Gag?
31. The Final Blow? The Techniques of the Destroyer Ninja
32. Tentochi Tower! The Battle on the Island in the Middle of the Sea
33. Here it is, Horror! The Mystery in the Forest of the Dead
34. Little Romance... What is Your Name?
35. Role Reversal; the Cracks of Love and Friendship
36. The Dance of the Wind! The Field of Flowers is a Danger Zone!
37. The Great Decisive Battle! Burn, Ramuness!
38. The Gathering of the 40! Be Forever, Hot Blood Power!

== Video games ==
NG Knight Ramune & 40 appeared in the 2009 crossover video game Super Robot Wars NEO featuring much of the main cast. It later appeared as one of the beginning titles used the multi-chapter release Super Robot Wars: Operation Extend which borrows many features from NEO.
