= VS Knight Ramune & 40 Fire =

Japanese manga, and anime television series

VS騎士ラムネ&40炎 (Bāsasu Naito Ramune to Fōtī Faia)
- Created by: Ashi Productions Planning Office (story); Satoru Akahori (concept)
- Anime television series
- Directed by: Yoshitaka Fujimoto (chief); Hiroshi Negishi
- Produced by: Tatsuo Yamazaki (Asatsu); Akiyoshi Sakai (Ashi Productions); Noriko Kobayashi (TV Tokyo)
- Written by: Satoru Akahori
- Music by: Shinkichi Mitsumune; Akira Nishizawa; Akira Odawara
- Studio: Ashi Productions
- Licensed by: NA: Discotek Media
- Original network: TXN (TV Tokyo)
- Original run: April 3, 1996 – September 25, 1996
- Episodes: 26
- Manga
- Written by: Mine Yoshizaki
- Published by: Kadokawa Shoten
- Magazine: Shōnen Ace
- Original run: June 1996 – July 1998
- Volumes: 5

VS Knight Ramune & 40 Fire (VS騎士ラムネ&40炎, Bāsasu Naito Ramune to Fōtī Faia) is a Japanese manga, and anime television series and is the sequel to NG Knight Ramune & 40. The character designer for the series was Tsukasa Kotobuki, noted for Saber Marionette. The show lasted for 26 episodes, and its story follows the adventures of Baba Lamunade, the son of Baba Ramune (the protagonist of NG Knight Ramune & 40). A sequel OVA was created called VS Knight Ramune & 40 FRESH (VS騎士ラムネ&40FRESH, Bāsasu Naito Ramune ando Fōtī Furesshu) which follows the adventures of Cacao and Parfait, holy virgins, in their search and rescue mission of the 4th Warrior Ramunes, given to them by the apparent head of their religious order, Master Follower. The anime was licensed in North America by Discotek Media on December 2, 2019, and can be watched on Crunchyroll.

A five volume manga by Mine Yoshizaki based on the series was serialized in Kadokawa Shoten's Monthly Shonen Ace magazine from June 1996 to July 1998. After VS Knight Ramune & 40 Fire ended, Martian Successor Nadesico would go on to replace it in its time slot a week later.

The main mecha of the series, Kaiser Fire, was featured in the 2011 video game Another Century's Episode Portable notable for being the only true super robot in the otherwise real robot cast. Kaiser Fire was also featured in the 2015 mobile game Super Robot Wars X-Ω as part of a limited time event.

== Characters ==
Baba Lamunade (Voiced by Takeshi Kusao): Lamunade bears a good resemblance to his father, since he is his son and the hero of the series. He is different from Ramune as he is less interested in video games than his father, but nevertheless amazed by them. He falls in love with more than one girl; apart from Parfait he develops sentimental feelings for Drum. He has the same catch phrase that his father uses ("I'm feeling incredibly hot blooded!!! RIGHT NOW!!!) and sometimes states a fact by saying that it is written in his DNA.

Parfait The Shrine Maiden (Voiced by Yuko Miyamura): She is one of the two "Shrine Maidens" who brings Lamunade into the Doki Doki space. She is rather bossy and seems to have an assertive attitude towards Lamunade, whom she calls "Lamuness", like Milk in the first series. She acts no different, but does get jealous and angry when she sees her man with another girl. She has long magenta colored hair, and magenta eyes and her color scheme is magenta colored. In the OVA, Parfait is a holy virgin in training. Beyond the third episode of the OVA, she pilots an experimental mecha naked, as the cockpit is filled with water as a shock absorber.

Cacao (Voiced by Kyoko Hikami): She is the other "Shrine Maiden" along with Parfait. She is timid and kind of oblivious to what is going on around her. Cacao is not fearless and she can fight which surprises many due to her small frame. She has a pendant that helps their team find each and every "Otamagate". In the OVA, she is a full-fledged holy virgin and she has strong magical powers. The dark-skinned girl explains that this magic works best when the body is unconstricted, and is thus naked at various points throughout the OVA.

Da Cider (Voiced by Kazuki Yao): The same character from the previous series. He meets up with the new Lamuness in the second episode after attempting to save him from Pheromone Lip and Narcist Dandy and is Lamuness' partner to pilot Kaiser Fire. He eventually follows the footsteps of the first generation Cider, that is fighting with Lamuness and at the end watching him fight Abraham.

Heavy Metal Ko (Voiced by TARAKO): Cider's snake-like companion, also from the previous series.

PQ (voiced by Satomi Kōrogi): He's the one who summon Kaiser Fire for Lamunade (Much like Tama Q did for King Scassher in the original series) and he is often pinched by him.

Akakaze and Momokaze (Voiced by Takeshi Kusao and Chisa Yokoyama) – A.K.A. Ramune and Milk. They are now married and very in-love. They both hide under costumes which is a parody of Gatchaman since they do not want too many questions to be asked. They have become stupid and lazy and their costumes were their wedding clothing which Milk designed.

Narcist Dandy and Pheromone Lip (Voiced by Yasunori Matsumoto and Michiko Neya): A grossly muscular man with a busty woman. These two are the new comic relief duo villains of the series. They try to stop Lamunade from reaching Don Genosai, but like Don Genosai they are priests of the Kira Kira temple.

Mito Natto (voiced by Showtaro Morikubo): He is a young dog ruler of Gao-Gao zone. Lamunade saves him from hunger and since then he became friends with him and is the owner of the second guardian knight Graf Thunder.

Drum, Trumpet, Cello, and Organ Symphony (Voiced by Yuka Imai (does Symphony as well as Drum), Tomoko Kawakami (Trumpet) and Naoko Takano (Cello)): They are three cyborgs created to protect the Hero Lamuness, but for the first Lamuness. Ramune never awakened them in the series because he was not the one to find them, it was Lamunade. Drum Loves the 1st hero through Lamunade because they look alike, Cello is sweet and cute, and Trumpet is gentle and pretty. Organ Symphony is the creator of the female cyborgs, in which Drum is modeled after her. They can pilot the 3rd guardian knight "Water Barron". Drum gives Lamuness a bell to call them if he ever needs help.

Don Genosai(Voiced by Kôzô Shioya): The main villain mastermind in charge of resurrecting Abraham, but is the head priest of the Kira Kira temple. It is later revealed he was under Abraham's control.

BQ (voiced by Satomi Kōrogi): After when Abraham awakens within the body of first Lamuness, BQ appeared to command Narcissist Dandy and Pheromone Lip.

Black Lamuness: aka Abraham: Abraham uses the body of Lamuness I, but when Lamunade defeats him he unleashed his true body to him.

== Mecha ==
=== Holy Knights ===
- Kaiser Fire: Powers include flight, the Kaiser Fi-Blade which launches fire birds, and an ice magic arrow called the Diamond Arrow.
- Graf Thunder: Powers include flight and the Grand Volt Crash which uses its wrist harpoons to launch lightning dogs.
- Water Baron: Powers include teleportation, dual head guns, hand energy discs, and the Baron Water Attack which uses water circles to launch a water dragon.
- Kaiser Fire Neo: Exclusive to the manga adaptation, this evolved version of the original Kaiser Fire's powers include the Royal Fi-Blade and self-repair.

=== Evil Knights ===
- Tiger FZ: Appears in episodes 1 and 2. Powers include a cannon for each arm and missile launchers around the body.
- Unknown 1: Appears in episode 3. Powers include a back missile pod and a chain-like electric whip.
- Mechabatton DX: Appears in episode 4. Powers include fight and a double barreled tank cannon.
- Heinkel VR: Appears in episode 5. Its only known power is a wrecking ball on the head.
- Unknown 2: Appears in episode 6. Its only known power is a large back cannon armed with hyper cement, a gatling gun, and a Super Macho Missile.
- Bismark GT: Appears in episode 7. Powers include an underside tractor beam, mind control waves from the dish on its shell, and a rapid fire missile pod from the shell.
- Unknown 3: Appears in episode 8. Powers include a pair of machine guns on the torso and extending hand claws.
- Hockel FK-1: Appears in episode 9. Powers include flight, a rocket launcher in each wrist and knee, and two missile launchers in each pectoral.
- Junkers VQ: Appears in episode 11. Its only known power is a pair of arm missile pods.
- Brocken SK: Appears in episode 11. Powers include a statue disguise, mind control waves, dual shoulder missile pods, a torso tractor beam, a laser beam from the eye, and an electric whip in the left arm.
- Mirror Spark: Appears in episode 14. Powers include a reflective body, controlling crystals, a head energy beam, and teleportation.
- Stone Summoner: Appears in episode 15. Powers include metamorphic waves that spawn rock men and controlling Stone Devil.
- Stone Devil: Appears in episode 15. Powers include burrowing, speed, eight spear legs, reformation, electric mouth webs, and a high resistance to heat.
- Sabot: Appears in episode 16. Powers include flight and nightmare waves from the mouth.
- Unknown 4: Appears in episode 17. Powers include a flamethrower in the right hand, teleporting dice on the shoulders, levitation, pelvis missiles, and summoning flying rocks.
- Unknown 5: Appears in episode 18. Powers include flight, body switching red fog, and a cannon.
- Tenko: Appears in episode 19. Powers include age reverting bubbles, levitation, a dimensional portal for magic in its body to pull out animals and bombs, a circular saw on the underside, and sharp claws.
- Unknown 6: Appears in episode 20. Powers include a jet mode and a machine gun for each arm and on each side of its head.
- Mecha Dragon: Appears in episode 21. Powers include burrowing, sharp claws, mouth flames, and electric bites.
- Mecha Dandy: Appears in episode 24. Powers include flight, a pair of axes, and strength.

== See also ==
- NG Knight Ramune & 40
- Ramune
- Knights of Ramune
