= Rei Omishi =

Japanese manga artist

Rei Omishi 臣士 れい
- Area: Manga artist
- Notable works: Sorcerer Hunters, Omishi Magical Theater: Risky Safety, Maze
- Collaborators: Satoru Akahori

Rei Omishi (臣士れい, Omishi Rei; also "Ray Omishi") is a Japanese screenwriter and manga artist. She is best known for illustrating the Sorcerer Hunters manga series, which was based on the light novels written by Satoru Akahori, and which was adapted into an anime series. Her other works include Omishi Magical Theater: Risky Safety and Maze.

== Works ==
Title	Year	Notes	Refs
Sorcerer Hunters manga Illustrator, written by Satoru Akahori	1993–98	Serialized in Dengeki Comic Gao! magazine Published by MediaWorks in 13 volumes	
Chouse Kitan Maze Bakunetsu Jikuu manga Written by Satoru Akahori	1995–99	Serialized in Comic Dragon magazine Published by Fujimi Shobo for 6 volumes	
Omishi Magical Theater: Risky Safety	1999–2000	Serialized in Dengeki Comic Gao! magazine Published by MediaWorks in 3 volumes	
Puchi puchi (プチプチ, Bubble Wrap)		Gangan Wing Comics, 3 volumes	
Kuresento mūn (クレセント・ムーン, Crescent Moon)		Eyes Comics, 3 volumes	
Kaiyō kiken seibutsuu ~ min (海洋危険生物う～みん, Marine intends dangerous organisms - Min); Illustrator, originally written by Sato o Kō		Gum Comics, 2 volumes	
Chotto dake kaettekita baku retsu hantā (ちょっとだけ帰ってきた爆れつハンター, Sorcerer Hunters: Came back a little bit); Illustrator, originally written by Satoru Akahori		Dengeki Comics, 1 volume	
Knight Flyer Tōkyō mahō-jin (Knight Flyer東京魔法陣, Knight Flyer Tokyo Magic)		Eyes Comics, 1 volume	
Positive girls! Omishi rei gashū (Positive girls!臣士れい画集, Positive girls! Omishi Rei book of paintings); Picture book		Eyes Comics, 1 volume	
Ayakashi ko Tan (アヤカシ古譚, Ayakashi old tan)		Boys Duo Selection, 1 volume	
Kick Up! Co-author with Yuki Mirai		Kadokawa Comics Ace, 1 volume	
Furagumentsu omishi rei sakuhin-shū (フラグメンツ臣士れい作品集, Fragments Omishi Rei Works)		Dengeki Comics, 1 volume	
