= Mon Colle Knights =

Japanese manga series

- Cover of the second manga volume featuring Mondo Ooya, Rockna Hiiragi, Gluko, and Batch.

六門天外モンコレナイト (Rokumon Tengai Mon Kore Naito)
- Genre: Adventure, comedy, fantasy
- Manga
- Written by: Satoru Akahori; Katsumi Hasegawa
- Illustrated by: Hideaki Nishikawa
- Published by: Kadokawa Shoten
- Magazine: Dragon Jr.
- Original run: September 27, 1999 – April 27, 2001
- Volumes: 4
- Anime television series
- Directed by: Yasunao Aoki
- Produced by: Fukashi Azuma; Kazunori Noguchi; Shinichi Ikeda
- Written by: Satoru Akahori; Katsumi Hasegawa
- Music by: Hiroshi Sakamoto
- Studio: Studio Deen
- Licensed by: NA: Discotek Media
- Original network: TV Tokyo
- English network: AU: Fox Kids; CA: Family Channel; UK: Fox Kids; US: Fox Kids, Jetix
- Original run: January 10, 2000 – December 25, 2000
- Episodes: 51 (Japan); 46 (English)
- Anime film

Mon Colle Knights the Movie: The Legendary Fire Dragon and The Mysterious Tatari-chan
- Directed by: Yasunao Aoki
- Produced by: Jōichi Mizuno; Kazunori Noguchi; Satoshi Kawano
- Written by: Satoru Akahori; Katsumi Hasegawa
- Music by: Hiroshi Sakamoto
- Studio: Studio Deen
- Released: July 15, 2000
- Runtime: 32 minutes

Mon Colle Knights, known in Japan as Six Gates Far Away Mon Colle Knight (Japanese: 六門天外モンコレナイト, Hepburn: Rokumon Tengai Mon Kore Naito), is a Japanese manga series written by Satoru Akahori and Katsumi Hasegawa and illustrated by Hideaki Nishikawa. The original concept was made by Hitoshi Yasuda and Group SNE. The series is based on the Monster Collection trading card game.

An anime television series adaptation animated by Studio Deen aired on TV Tokyo from January to December 2000 and consisted of 51 episodes and one film. The Saban-produced Mon Colle Knights aired on Fox Kids in North America from July 2001 to September 2002, consisting of 45 episodes. In 2006, it aired in reruns on Toon Disney's Jetix on Sundays, as part of Jetix's "Anime Invasion Sundays" block. The manga was published in English in Singapore by Chuang Yi.

On June 9, 2020, the original Japanese version became available on Crunchyroll via Discotek Media. According to Justin Sevakis, the only reason why the anime was only available on Crunchyroll in Japanese is that the masters for the English dub couldn't be found. Discotek Media asked fans to help find the masters. They were still searching for it as of September 15, 2020. Discotek Media released the anime sub-only on Blu-ray on April 27, 2021. However, Discotek Media promised that they were still looking for the English dub. Discotek had found the English dub masters and released the English dub on Blu-ray on May 31, 2022.

== Plot ==
The series features Mondo Ooya and his classmate/girlfriend Rockna Hiiragi (Rokuna in the Japanese version), whose scientist father Professor Ichiroubei Hiiragi invented a way to travel to Mon World (Roku Mon Sekai: the Six Gate World), where all sorts of magical creatures live. Together, they try to find six monster items which, when combined, could connect the Six Gate World with planet Earth for the better of both worlds. Rokuna and Mondo form the Mon Colle Knights and find out that when chanting a phrase-("With us, you can do it!") they can merge into monsters and control them into battle as well as aid with spells. Almost every episode, they battle Professor Hiiragi's rival Prince Eccentro (Count Collection in the Japanese version) and his two girl underlings Gluko and Batch (Gūko and Bachi in the Japanese version) who are after the same thing as the Mon Colle Knights, except that they intend to use the items to dominate both worlds.

== Main characters ==
=== Mon Colle Knights ===
- Mondo Ooya (大矢 門斗, Ōya Mondo)

Voiced by: Tomo Saeki (Japanese); Derek Stephen Prince (English)

One of the main protagonists of the series and is an elementary school student at a local public school. Mondo is an adventurous young boy who seeks to gather the Mon items to bring together his world and Mon world for peace and friendship. Even though he has an outgoing and determined nature, Mondo has a little problem: he always flirts with pretty girls (Beginner, Kahimi, and Lailai are the most notable). Note that the first Kanji in Mondo's name; "Mon (門, Mon)," is the same that is used in the Mon Colle Knights title, Roku Mon Tengai Mon Colle Knight (六門天外モンコレナイト, Roku Mon Tengai Mon Kore Naito). He has devices that he uses for his peace sign attack.

- Rokuna Hiiragi (柊 六奈, Hiiragi Rokuna) / Rockna Hiiragi

Voiced by: Yui Horie (Japanese); Brianne Siddall (English)

One of the main protagonists of the series. Rokuna is Mondo's genius friend and classmate from school, whose intentions match Mondo's. She has a special telepathic ability to communicate with monsters. Now her boyfriend Mondo likes drooling over her but she gets jealous if Mondo flirts with other girls causing Rokuna to attack him. The first Kanji in Rockna's name; "Roku (六, Roku)," is the same that is used in the Mon Colle Knights title, Roku Mon Tengai Mon Kore Naito (六門天外モンコレナイト, Roku Mon Tengai Mon Kore Naito). She has a baton like devices which she uses for her string or ribbon attack.

- Professor Ichiroubei Hiiragi (柊 一郎兵衛, Hiiragi Ichirōbei)

Voiced by: Shigeru Chiba (Japanese); Jamieson Price (English)

Rokuna's father and a rather eccentric sort of mad scientist. He discovered Mon World and wants the human world to know about it so he can win many awards. His laboratory is right across the street from Mondo and Rokuna's school.

- Jāne (ジャーネ, Jāne) / Lovestar

Voiced by: Yuko Mizutani (Japanese); Wendee Lee (English)

Lovestar is a Zeechi that Rokuna adopted. A pale pink hamster-like monster with a red star marked on its back. In the Japanese version, their species is called "Lovestar" because the sounds the creatures make resemble the word "love-love" and the pattern on their backs make a star. Also in the Japanese version, Lovestar is called "Jāne," because, when Rokuna was trying to say goodbye ("Jā ne") to it, Lovestar thought she was calling it by name.

- Punchpunch (パンチパンチ, Panchipanchi)

Voiced by: Maria Yamamoto

A tiny monkey monster who punches.

- Cluckputer

Professor Hiiragi's chicken-based super computer. It usually serves as a computer for Professor Hiiragi and goes off by making chicken noises whenever a monster is nearby.

=== Collection team ===
- Count Ludwig Presto Von Meinstein Collection (ルードヴィヒ・ブレスト・フォン・マインシュタイン・コレクション, Rūdovihi Buresuto Fon Mainshutain Korekushon) / Prince Ludwig Von Monsterstein Eccentro

Voiced by: Kazuhiko Inoue (Japanese); Joe Ochman (English)

One of the principal antagonists of the series. Prince Eccentro is a young effeminate aristocrat from Europe who wants to take over Mon World. He was born in 1974 and he was trained by Tanaka when his father wanted him to be a bad guy. He is not very threatening due to his eccentric behavior and hysterical persona at times. However, he is the inventor of the hypnotic Skeitso Beam (whether on his Flying Lion aircraft or Teddyarenaut) which he uses to bend monsters to his will. Because of that, he tends to have his evil moments, though he really isn't as evil as he brags himself to be. Everytime Prince Eccentro fails, Tanaka would punish him with back-breaking exercises and/or harsh training that is related to the episode's content. His dream is apparently to become a world famous belly dancer.

- Teddyarenaut

A bear-like computer created by Eccentro. He serves as the counterpart to the Cluckputer and has a built-in Skeitso Beam. In one episode, he temporarily developed an A.I. because Savant Bear thought he was their king.

- Bachi (バッチィ, Bachii) / Batch

Voiced by: Kyoko Hikami (Japanese); Wendee Lee (English)

Eccentro's tomboyish lackey, with a brash, spunky, and often sarcastic personality. She tends to be much more committed to evil deeds than the foppish Eccentro or the air-headed Gluko. Batch unfortunately gets punished by Tanaka as well except in two episodes. Batch and Eccentro argue a lot, and sometimes Batch shows amusement at Eccentro's mishaps. Ultimately they have a trusting and friendly relationship though, and Batch always follows the Count's orders. She is shown to be a fitness enthusiast, as her bedroom is filled with exercise equipment. In the Japanese version, she speaks with a distinct Kansai dialect.

- Guuko (グーコ, Gūko) / Gluko

Voiced by: Yuka Imai (Japanese); Dina Sherman (English)

Eccentro's big-breasted, yet air-headed and friendly underling. She is always spared by Tanaka when it is time for punishment and has an amount of luck. Gluko never seems to get hurt while the rest of her team and the Mon Colle Knights usually does. An English ongoing joke in the series is that during Eccentro's launch sequence in each episode, she asks a very long and logic based question which ends with Eccentro and Batch becoming bored and saying "Never mind, Gluko." In the Japanese version, Gluko speaks in a very polite and respectful dialect whether she's talking to her teammates or her enemies. Gluko also carries around a book detailing about Mon World and his creatures. In a later episode, Gluko ends up adopting a Forest Imp named Impy.

- Chuzaemon Takenaka (竹中 忠左衛門, Takenaka Chūzaemon) / Tanaka

Voiced by: Yuji Ueda (Japanese); Michael Sorich (English)

A midget old man who serves as Eccentro's mentor under the orders of Eccentro's father. He usually punishes Eccentro for his screw ups (and/or lack of manly attitude) with back-breaking exercises and/or harsh training related to the episode's content. Tanaka tends to pop up anywhere.

- Repuri (レプリちゃん, Repuri-chan) / Impy

Voiced by: Marina Yamamoto (Japanese); R. Martin Klein (English)

A cheerful young Forest Imp (Leprechaun in the Japanese version) who is Gluko's pet. Gluko first found him in the forest near where Vipress was imprisoned. Impy doesn't talk very much -- he usually only utters short, inquisitive questions (such as "What this?"), or repeats cheerfully what Gluko says. He has psychic powers that allow him to telekinetically move things around, which comes in handy for some of Eccentro's schemes. Impy also has a habit of fiddling with buttons on the Flying Lion aircraft and more often than not causing it to explode and send him and his allies blasting off. Despite his apparent carefree and dimwitted personality, Impy does care a lot for Gluko. A running gag sees him using his powers to switch Tanaka and Eccentro around in order for the latter to escape and make his attempt to conquer Mon World for the episode.

=== Supporting cast ===
- Namiko Gokumare (極稀 並子, Gokumare Namiko) / Naomi Loon

Voiced by: Yuko Mizutani (Japanese); Wendee Lee (English)

Mondo and Rokuna's teacher, a rather nice lady who has a short temper and terrible luck with love. Thanks to a malfunctioning Teddyarenaut, there is a monster card featuring her that is in Prince Eccentro's possession. She is a skilled fighter as seen in some episodes.

- Beginner (ビギナーちゃん, Biginā-chan)

Voiced by: Mika Kanai (Japanese); Philece Sampler (English)

A cute but accident-prone girl with a large appetite who is learning to become a summoner. While powerful, her aim is terrible, so she tends to hurt her allies by accident. As a running gag, she has a habit of summoning a giant meteor that always ends destroying something. She is a friend of Mondo and Rokuna. Her grandfather, Expert, runs the summoning school she attends. In the Japanese version, Beginner refers to Mondo and Rokuna collectively as "Roku-Mon-chan," much to their annoyance.

- Lailai (ライライ, Rairai)

Voiced by: Tomoko Ishimura (Japanese); Melissa Fahn (English)

A young girl which the Mon Colle Knights often encounter at random, while she travels the world carrying impossible amounts of little monsters in her coat. She gave Lovestar to Rokuna.

- Songstress of the Flower Garden (花園の歌姫, Hanazono no Utahime) / Kahimi

Voiced by: Yumi Kakazu (Japanese); Tifanie Christun (English)

An elf maiden with very long hair, whose beauty incites Rokuna's jealousy whenever Mondo compliments Kahimi (though Rokuna holds nothing against Kahimi herself). She becomes a good friend and ally of the Mon Colle Knights, especially with her ability to make plants grow and control over the winds of Mon World.

- Luke (ルーク, Rūku)

Voiced by: Yumiko Kobayashi (Japanese); Lex Lang (English)

A friend of Beginner's who goes to the same summoning school as her. Luke has a poorly-disguised crush on Beginner and seems to like Rokuna. Luke is a summoning prodigy and considers Mondo his biggest rival as a monster summoner and for Beginner's heart. Around Beginner, Luke becomes so nervous he can summon only purple sheep, not to be confused with his own sheep friend, Lambda. Beginner, for her part, is oblivious to Luke's crush on her. Luke acts rather stingy and aloof towards strangers and he tends to be a bit of a crybaby when things don't go his way -- such as when someone, usually Mondo, interacts with Beginner or Lambda -- but he shows himself to quite brave in the face of danger, and his summoning abilities make him handy to have around. Prince Eccentro once lied to Luke telling him that Mondo is not a very good person causing Luke to summon Basilosaurus to attack Mondo with. Luke learned the truth when Prince Eccentro took over Basilosaurus.

- Lambda (ランダ, Randa)

A purple sheep who is a friend of Luke's.

- Zaha (ザッハ, Zahha) / Gabriolis

Voiced by: Shin-ichiro Miki (Japanese); Daran Norris (English)

A former Light Angel. During a great war between good and evil, he was wounded and left behind by his friend Lark. He felt betrayed and abandoned and embraced the darkness that Redda offered him transforming him into a Dark Angel. He plagued the Mon Colle Knights on different occasions involving attacking Doppelganger and casting a spell on 3 of Mondo's cards (consisting of Forester the Forest Giant, Flying Stego, and Scorch the Fire Monster) until Spectra appeared and reversed the spell. When he was weakened by Vipress's attack during his fight with Mondo and Water Dragon after Redda took control of the monsters, it was later revealed by Spectra and the Angel of all Oceans that Lark, in fact, took his place in battle and died (in the English dub, he went to divert an approaching enemy flock and wasn't seen again) after which Gabriolis realized his error and reverted to good, though maintaining his dark appearance. He also helped Mondo and Rockna defeat Dread Dragon and destroyed Redda in the final episode. Zaha's name is derived from Zahariel, which means "Brightness of God". Zahariel was the angel who would help people resist temptation. This is both ironic and fitting to his character, as he would first failed to resist temptation, then become someone who temps others, then turns into someone who helps others resist temptation, and finally become someone who is able to resist it himself too. The English dubbed name is derived from Gabriel, one of the archangels who typically serves as a messenger to humans from God.

- Rutto (ルット) / Lucca

He is a small demonic creature who is Gabriolis' friend and partner. On one occasion, he had possession of an item that had to be won over in a Mon World Baseball tournament.

- Redda (レダ, Reda)

Voiced by: Takehito Koyasu (Japanese); Tom Wyner (English)

One of the principal antagonists of the series. Redda is a fallen angel like Gabriolis, who wants to use the six items to summon Oroboros. He is powerful, but not the strongest. Redda would prefer to avoid battle when not having a good advantage. In the dub, he wants to create a world of nothingness. In the original, he wants to create a formless world where all souls are the same and neither good nor evil will exist. Redda was the one who enabled Gabriolis to embrace the darkness after he was seemingly abandoned. In the final battle, he is killed by Gabriolis.

- N-Nouncer

A man with a circle that has the letter N on it. He serves as the announcer of any tournaments in Mon World.

- Shiru (シル) / Spectra the Angel

Voiced by: Asako Dodo (Japanese); Debbie Rothstein (English)

Lark's sister and Zaha's fiance in the Japanese version (she is Gabriolis' sister in the English dub) who sports a long gold dress and is always barefoot. Spectra is a Light Angel who comes to Gabriolis in his darkest hour to show him what really happened in the past so he may find redemption. She reappeared when Redda was chasing after her near the Fire Angel's castle and was rescued by the Mon Colle Knights.

- Forest Angel / Earth Angel

Mon World's guardian angel of the Earth Realm who sports five pairs of wings. She first appeared to help the Mon Colle Knights put the Four-Armed Giant back to sleep by summoning the Emerald Dragon. It was the Forest Angel who told the Mon Colle Knights of the Guardian Angels' roles.

- Flame Angel / Fire Angel

Voiced by: Melodee Spevack

The guardian angel of the Fire Realm and the Guardian of the Solar Scepter (one of the Mon items).

- Angel of all Oceans / Water Angel

Voiced by: Wendee Lee

The guardian angel of the Water Realm and Guardian of the Arialla Pearl (one of the Mon items) who sports long purple hair, three wings, wears a strange dress, and is always barefoot. The Angel of all Oceans and Spectra revealed to Gabriolis what really happened the day when he was "abandoned."

- Cloud Angel

Mon World's guardian angel of the Wind Realm who sports two pairs of wings.

== Monsters ==
This is a list of all monsters featured in the anime Mon Colle Knights.

- Chimera - A three-headed monster that resemble a lion with dragon wings. It has a lion head, a maned lizard head, and a maned goat head where all three heads breathe fire. Prince Eccentro considers Chimera as one of his most powerful monsters.
- Squirt Fish - A small fish that can squirt water at its enemies. It comes in a variety of different sizes.
- Bisonator (Frenzied Bison in the Japanese version) - A powerful bison monster.
- Fog Dragon (Mist Dragon in the Japanese version) - A white dragon that uses fog to defend itself or hide in for protection. It looks like a plesiosaurus with turtle flippers and a nearly unseen shell on its back.
- Fish People - Mermaid-type monsters that have great singing voices.
- Gill Men - Anthropomorphic salamanders without tails that ride the waves and wield tridents.
- Toad Warrior (Poison Toad in the Japanese version) - A giant toad who isn't as tough as he looks, but he loves to eat flies.
- Cat King - A small humanoid white cat walking on his hind legs and wearing clothes. He rules a kingdom of similar cats.
- Ballerina Cat - A bit taller, more anthropomorphic feline with black fur and ballerina outfit, always speaking in rhyme.
- Sonic Condor - A giant condor monster that can fly very fast. It is a monster that has elements of both a phoenix and a roc.
- Flying Stego - A large purple dragon that seems to have a plane engine in its chest.
- Behemoth - A giant rhinoceros-like creature with a grey armored shell. He is Forester the Forest Giant's rival.
- Forester the Forest Giant - A giant who lives in the sandstone formations near the forest he protects. He hates violence unless if he has to defend himself. Forester is Behemoth's rival.
- Pegasus - A chibi winged horse that grew out into a full-fledged pegasus with Mondo's help. He remains a great and loyal friend to Mondo who cares deeply about him in return.
- Griffin (Hippogriff in the Japanese version) - A Hippogriff-type monsters, colored mostly black.
- War Hogs (Orcs in the Japanese version) - Anthropomorphic pigs who are at war with the Forest Elves. They are extremely lazy.
- Forest Elves - Elves in the simplest sense. It would seem their warriors are exclusively female and are led by Sonnet. They're rather afraid of dirt.
- Forest Elf King - The king of the aforementioned elves, unlike his warriors a gentle being.
- Rex - A Tyrannosaurus-type monster.
- Ogre Tribe - Inhabitants of the Fire Realm, they value strength very much and are not all too smart. Their main village has been accidentally destroyed by Beginner by summoning a giant meteor.
  - Pose Brothers (Ogre Power Brothers in the Japanese version) - Two ogres who were paired up with Prince Eccentro in a tournament run by ogres.
- Airiphant - A small pink flying elephant who blows tornadoes after inhaling.
- Nighthawk Male - A dark brown giant bird. It was once controlled by Eccentro once to attack his own wife and nest.
- Nighthawk Female - A light brown giant bird.
- Leviathan - A large dark blue carp-like fish with sharp teeth.
- Water Dragon - A long blue water serpent-like creature that can create large tidal waves.
  - Spectra Water Dragon - Water Dragon's evolved form.
- Count Dragula - A vampire spirit that possessed Eccentro, temporarily turning him into the epitome of manliness/evil that Tanaka tried to achieve in him. He has a number of evil minions that include zombies.
- Cave Wolves - Anthropomorphic wolves that use shovels to dig and hunt treasure. Not to be confused with werewolves.
- Rocky the Boulder - A boulder monster that goes after anything in sight.
- Underminers - Blue gnome-like creatures who don't seem to intelligent and spend their lives mining.
- King Pezno the Penguin - A penguin monster who uses his crown to summon monsters to his aid.
- Serpentine Slither - A giant serpent monster that resides in hot springs.
- Phoenix - A hybrid of a Valkyrie and a harpy. This humanoid has wings for arms and a great deal of Light Magic.
- Snow Ram - A ram/dragon monster who causes the winter in Mon World when not hibernating.
- Storm Dragon - A dark stone-blue dragon who has power over electricity. He has a son who Beginner accidentally summoned when the Snow Ram was causing a blizzard when it wasn't winter.
  - Cyclone Storm Dragon - Storm Dragon's evolved form.
- Earth Dragon - A dull-green/brown Godzilla-like mimic (minus the plates on his back). He found the boots that enabled anyone flight. To earn them, a tournament occurred and he was the referee until Tanaka summoned him (Tanaka had a copy of the Earth Dragon's card). He lost the tournament and surrendered the boots, which turned out to be one of the Monster-Items.
  - Emperor Earth Dragon - Earth Dragon's evolved stage.
- Sombrero Cactus - Living cacti with a sombrero, a guitar and a Mexican scarf. There is a female one with a pink dress.
- Giant Praying Mantis -
- Marvel Beetle -
- Dragonfly -
- Giant Waterbug -
- Volcano Shark -
- Arboreal Ancient - A large living tree with a face vaguely visible in its bast.
- Fire Butterfly - A giant spell-casting butterfly monster.
- Mirrorbug - A power draining parasitic beetle.
- Thunderbug - A white beetle that is the mirrorbug's natural enemy.
- Slobilonians - A race of Goblin-like men who eat a lot and they kidnap people to keep their home clean.
- Troll - A giant teal-skinned troll.
- Punch-Punch - Tiny monkey monsters who pack a punch when working together in groups.
- Snail Monster - A weak snail monster.
- Ripley Pine -
- Giant Flea -
- Garter Snake -
- Big Beetle -
- Goat Boy - A weak satyr-like monster.
- Jellyfish -
- Toilet Flush -
- Base - A bomb-like monster.
- Mushroom Head - A weak mushroom-topped monster.
- Tiger-Man - A man who can become a humanoid tiger when angered.
- Sparrow Squad - Three small in-training valkyrie girls that ride huge sparrows.
- Winged Warrior - A female warrior that rides a large swan.
- Centaurs - Horses with human torsos and horns. They seem to have a culture similar to that of the Native Americans.
  - Centaur King (a.k.a. King of 100 Battles) - The massive king of all Centaurs who had never lost a battle.
- Pythonic Viper - A large sight sensitive serpent.
- Nine-Headed Swamp Dragon (Swamp Hydra in the English dub) - A Hydra-type monster.
- Toxic Phantoms - Skull-faced reapers that drain the energy of their victims.
- Dopplefanger (Orthros in the Japanese version) - An Orthrus-type monster.
- Rhino Rex (Idiot Rhino in the Japanese version) - Basically, a slightly larger rhinoceros monster who is not very bright.
- Cycloptus (Cyclops in the Japanese version) - A Cyclops-type monster from the Earth Realm with psychic powers and elemental abilities who terrorized the Air Realm. Examples of his psychic and elemental powers involved electrocuting Prince Eccentro with lightning and using a wind attack on Batch. Before it can use its abilities on Gluko, Tenaka got in the way and ended up frozen in ice.
- Winged Yeti (White Yeti in the Japanese version) - An egg shaped Light-elemental with tiny wings, living high in the mountains and is an expert giant slayer.
- Grimbat - Small demon-like creatures who cause bad luck, varying from people making bad decisions to explosions. It is revealed that one of them was behind Prince Eccentro's bad luck.
- Volcanu - A rock giant with lava for blood.
- Water Sprite - A female form with fins for ears and a fish tail, entirely made out of water. She can take any form of water.
- Zap the Eel Monster - A giant electric eel monster.
- Scorch the Fire Monster - A fiery beast.
- Dobe Rats - These small rat monsters attack in groups.
- Viperess (Kowataru in the Japanese version) - A powerful winged-viper monster that was sealed away by ancient warriors in a domino structure.
- Emu - Just a normal emu, but with super-speed.
- Giant Squid - A giant squid that attacks with its tentacles.
- Aquagon the Sea King - A sea giant with teal hair who rules Mon World's seas.
- Horned Beetle - A giant beetle monster.
- Mastodon -
- Giant Boar -
- Spiky Giant Ape -
- Giant Mole -
- Giant Tapeworm -
- Lemming - Tiny white mouse-like creatures, without tail. The strength of one is determined by how many Lemmings are around.
- Purple Sheep (Silent Sheep in the Japanese version) - Lambda's kind. They are regular sheep except for being purple.
- Elephant Monster - A big elephant with red eyes.
- Basailosaurus - A Dimetrodon-type monster.
- Pearl Princess - A mermaid who lives in the Water Realm. She can create a shield which reflects other monsters' attacks including the monsters themselves.
- White Dolphin - A dolphin-like creature.
- Ogopogo - A giant deep sea fish with a vicious nature.
- Tyrannous - A lava Tyrannosaurus monster.
- Baseball Giant - A baseball-themed giant.
- Diamond Star - A star-headed monster that was on Eccentro's baseball team.
- Speedy Hedgehog - A fast hedgehog who was on Eccentro's baseball team.
- Hurricane Eagle - A large eagle.
- Lotocus (Diplodocus in the Japanese version) - A Diplodocus-type monster that is colored entirely white.
- Zazeus - A demon who is also known as "The Storm King" and Dragowrath's mortal enemy (a wind elemental in the Japanese dub, evil in the original version).
- Dragowrath - A giant dragon who is also known as "The Giant Dragon King of the Winds" and Zazeus' mortal enemy. When he and Zazeus are released, they create powerful winds which destroys the forest in the Wind Realm.
- Forest Fearies - Tiny butterfly winged faeries who guard the key to awakening Zazeus and Dragowrath. It seems that they are distrustful of strangers.
- Tiamat the Dragon Empress - The Queen of all Dragons with the upper body of a warrior woman. She resides in the ocean bordering the Water Realm and the Realm of Evil.
- Ten-Armed Scorpula - A ferocious giant-like monster with ten arms who is under a sleeping spell to keep him from wreaking havoc.
- Emerald Dragon - A green, spiky dragon that is similar to Ankylosaurus.
- Crikey the Crocodile Monster - A giant crocodile.
- Lizard Men - A race of reptilian humanoids that live in a swamp village.
- Chameldragon - A tiny winged dragon that can increase its size.
- Grendel (a.k.a. Beowulf) -
- Miners - Dwarf-like men who are grizzled and spend their days mining, hence the name. They don't like Slobgonians very much.
- Stone Giant - A giant made of stone.
- Giant Sunbird - A four-winged sunbird summoned by Luke to help the Mon Colle Knight fight the Stone Giant.
- Sun Devil - A living fireball with a face.
- Boom Dragon - A large and obese orange dragon whose stomach is apparently a bomb and its tail is a fuse.
- Lava Lizard - A large purple dinosaur-creature that can turn into lava and move through the ground this way.
- Kiki the Cleaning Monster - A rabbit-like monster who uses a magical broom to clean anything.
- Bone Dragon - A skeletal dragon monster that can reassemble if dismantled by an attack. Only a magical creature can defeat it.
- Hippopotamus Monster - A hippopotamus monster that looks like a giant pink piggy bank with tiny wings.
- Taurus Ogre -
- Fire Dragon - A ruby-red dragon similar to an oriental dragon in form. He is witty, but also very intelligent.
  - Extreme Fire Dragon (Final Fire Dragon in the Japanese version) - Fire Dragon's evolved form that resembles a bipedal dragon with wings.
- Giant Sandworm - A giant sandworm found in the Earth Realm. It is by far the largest monster in the series. Supposedly it was invincible, but was still beaten by the Fire Dragon.
- Daemond - A giant demon summoned by Redda. He proved more than a match for the Fire Dragon, but was overwhelmed and killed by the Extreme Fire Dragon.
- Gargoyles - A race of Jersey Devil-like creatures. The Gargoyles are Redda's minions in the Realm of Evil.
- Winged Destroyer - A fearsome giant black bird that is one of Redda's minions in the Realm of Evil.
- Questing Beast -
- Dread Dragon - A darkness dragon. It has a giant eye thing on a long neck that shoots deadly beams. Killed by Gabriolis when Mondo and Rockna merged with him. Redda later revived the Dread Dragon in order to be a host for Oroboros.
- Oroboros - A formless creature referred to as "Time Master". It was released by Redda who used the Mon-World items for this and it took possession of the dead form of the Dread Dragon.
- Doomsday Dragon (Apocalypse Dragon in the Japanese version) - Oroboros incarnated into the Dread Dragon. One of his eyes reverts time and the other speeds up time. Redda intended to use him to destroy Mon-World. He was too-powerful even for the four evolved dragons, the six elemental angels, and the Mon Colle Knights combined. When the Golden Dragon was summoned and had all of the elements channeled into him, he destroyed the Doomsday Dragon and forced Oroboros back into his own realm.
- Golden Dragon (Saint Star Dragon in the Japanese version) - The most powerful monster in Mon World that was prophesied to appear when it was needed and did so when summoned by angels to stop Doomsday Dragon. All elements, including "Evil" were channeled into him to defeat the Doomsday Dragon.

== Mon World Realms ==
These are the six realms of Mon World:

- Earth Realm - A realm that is partially desert and forest. Home-realm to the Earth Angel and Earth-based monsters.
- Wind Realm - A windy realm that is home to the Cloud Angel and Wind-based monsters. Sky City floats here.
- Fire Realm - A realm filled with volcanoes, lava pits, and hot springs. Home-realm to the Fire Angel and Fire-based monsters.
- Water Realm - A realm that is mostly oceans with islands. Home-realm to the Angel of all Oceans and Water-based monsters.
- Light Realm (a.k.a. Holy Realm) - A realm that's home to Spectra the Angel and other Light-based monsters.
- Darkness Realm (a.k.a. Demon Realm) - A realm filled with Darkness-based monsters. Gabriolis, Lucca and Redda live here.

== Episodes ==
Note: The titles for the Japanese version and the summaries are taken from Discotek Media's upload to Crunchyroll.

Japanese episode no.	U.S. episode no.	Title	Original release date	U.S. air date
1	1	"Fly to the World of Six Gates!"(Just Another Mon-Day); Transliteration: "SUTton de rokumon sekai!" (Japanese: スッ飛んで六門世界!)	January 10, 2000	July 21, 2001
5th graders Mondo Ohya and Rokuna Hiiragi, along with her genius scientist father, Ichiroubei, journey to Six Gates, a world full of monsters and powerful items.
2	N–A	"Jahnay the Lovestar!"N/A; Transliteration: "JAANE to bakari ni RABUSUTAA!" (Japanese: ジャーネとばかりにラブスター!)	January 17, 2000	Unaired
Mondo and Rokuna help a girl search for a lost monster in water element territory.
3	3	"Clash of the Giants!"(The Giant and the Steed Part 1); Transliteration: "DOKAN to gekitotsu JAIANTO!" (Japanese: ドカンと激突ジャイアント!)	January 24, 2000	October 20, 2001
A battle of the behemoths takes place in a forest, with the Mon Colle Knights and Count Collection controlling giant monsters.
4	2	"Mermaid Magic, Bippity-boppity-boo!"(Send in the Frogs!); Transliteration: "ningyo no mahou de BUNBUNBUN!" (Japanese: 人魚の魔法でブンブンブン!)	January 31, 2000	July 21, 2001
To save the Mermen Tabernacle Choir, Rokuna has to possess a giant frog monster... but she hates frogs.
5	N–A	"Blooming Love Senorita!"; Transliteration: "koi no hana saku SENYORI-TA" (Japanese: 恋の花咲くセニョリ～タ)	February 7, 2000	Unaired
The Knights come upon a land of feuding cactus people, with two young lovers caught in the middle.
6	3	"Run, It's an Air Race!"(The Giant and the Steed Part 2); Transliteration: "sora tobu REESU da. sora hashire!" (Japanese: 空飛ぶレースだ・そら走れ!)	February 14, 2000	October 20, 2001
Mondo on a baby Pegasus vies against Collection riding a Hippogriff in a thrilling air race.
7	9	"From Stylish to Orction?!"(Pork Bellies and New Beginnings Part 1); Transliteration: "koiki na aitsu wa OUKUSHON!?" (Japanese: 小粋なあいつはオークション!?)	February 21, 2000	November 10, 2001
After gaining major stress weight, Collection fits right in as the self-proclaimed king of the Orcs.
8	9	"Beginner-chan Is an Evocater?!"(Pork Bellies and New Beginnings Part 2); Transliteration: "BIGINAA-chan wa shoukan jutsushi!?" (Japanese: ビギナーちゃんは召喚術師!?)	February 28, 2000	November 10, 2001
The Knights meet Beginner-chan, a girl who has the skill to summon monsters at will.
9	8	"Even Jahnay Tries Hard!"(Lovestar Can Help Too); Transliteration: "JAANE datte, ganbaru ZOU!" (Japanese: ジャーネだって、がんばるゾウ!)	March 6, 2000	July 13, 2002
When the Knights are between a Roc and a hard place, only Jahnay can save the day.
10	6	"Oh, My Washed-up Friend!"(Friend or Phobia?); Transliteration: "nagasarete OH MAI FURENDO!" (Japanese: 流されてOhマイフレンド!)	March 13, 2000	November 17, 2001
When Mondo and Collection are washed up on a desert island together, they become friends?!
11	12	"Dig It Up, Get Lost and Drop It!"(Under the Temple and Into Hot War Part 1); Transliteration: "hotte mayotte okkochiru-" (Japanese: 掘って迷って落っこちるぅ～)	March 20, 2000	November 3, 2001
The Knights search for a Mon Mon Item in ancient ruins, only to find plenty of deathtraps and hole-digging Kobolds.
12	10	"Show Me Your Smile Once More!"(To See You Smile Again); Transliteration: "KIMI no egao wo mouichido" (Japanese: キミの笑顔をもう一度)	March 27, 2000	October 31, 2001
Much to Rokuna's fury, Mondo seems to fall for the Diva of the Garden, an elf princess who's bugged by a certain problem.
13	7	"A Very Rare Big Adventure!"(Mrs. Loon's Big Adventure); Transliteration: "gokumare na daibouken!" (Japanese: ごくまれな大冒険!)	April 3, 2000	November 24, 2001
Lonely 5th grade teacher Namiko Gokumare hitches a ride to Six Gates and even helps the Knights in an adventure.
14	12	"Does the King Like It Hot?"(Under the Temple and Into Hot Water Part 2); Transliteration: "ousama wa oatsui no ga osuki?" (Japanese: 王様はお熱いのがお好き?)	April 10, 2000	November 3, 2001
Mondo and Rokuna encounter a talkative penguin at a hot spring, as you do, but party poopers Collection and company aren't far behind.
15	11	"Howling at the Night Sky, Dragons!"(Beginner and the Snow Ram); Transliteration: "yozora ni hoero! DORAGONZU" (Japanese: 夜空に吠えろ!ドラゴンズ)	April 17, 2000	November 24, 2001
The Knights deal with a Frost Dragon causing unseasonable blizzards.
16	4	"Is There Something in the Arisona Desert?!"(These Boots Were Made for Flying); Transliteration: "nanka ari so na ARISONA sabaku !?" (Japanese: なんかありそなアリソナ砂漠!?)	April 24, 2000	December 1, 2001
The Mon Colle Knights finally find a Mon Mon Item, but its Earth Dragon owner doesn't want to give it up.
17	5	"Justice Prevails?! Mon Colle Knights"(The Dream Team); Transliteration: "seigi no shouri ka!? MONKORENAITO" (Japanese: 正義の勝利か!?モンコレナイト)	May 1, 2000	December 8, 2001
It is the Knights versus Collection in an all-out monster battle over the second Mon Mon Item.
18	13	"Knockout by Punch-Punch!"(Knockout Punch-Punch); Transliteration: "PANCHI PANCHI de NOKKU DAUN!" (Japanese: パンチパンチでノックダウン!)	May 8, 2000	December 22, 2001
Count Collection and company are kidnapped by Goblins and forced to become maids.
19	14	"My Little Brother, Kenta-kun!"(Oh, Brother); Transliteration: "atashi no otouto KENTA-kun!" (Japanese: あたしの弟ケンタくん!)	May 15, 2000	December 29, 2001
Mondo gets jealous when Rokuna "adopts" Kenta, a young centaur, as a little brother.
20	15	"Black Wings Flutter in the Dark!"(Fangs for the Knight-mare); Transliteration: "kuroi tsubasa ga yami ni mau!" (Japanese: 黒い翼が闇に舞う!)	May 22, 2000	January 5, 2002
Mondo is stalked by a demonic fallen angel.
21	16	"Sky City Showdown!"(A Giant Pain in the Mondo); Transliteration: "kuuchuu toshi no dai kessen!" (Japanese: 空中都市の大決戦!)	May 29, 2000	January 12, 2002
It is a happy reunion with Pegasus on Cloud Island, interrupted by a powerful giant monster.
22	17	"How About Some Terrible Luck, a Great Misfortune, or Unhappiness?"(Eccentro in the Temple of Dumb); Transliteration: "daikyou・taiyaku・fukou wa ika ga?" (Japanese: 大凶・大厄・不幸はいかが?)	June 5, 2000	January 19, 2002
Both the Knights and Collection are plagued by a malicious, ill luck-bringing Gremlin.
23	18	"The Coveted June Bride!"(Ring-a-ding-ding); Transliteration: "aa akogare no JUUN・BURAIDO" (Japanese: ああ憧れのジューン・ブライド)	June 12, 2000	January 26, 2002
A misunderstanding involving a ring leads to a werecat thinking Rokuna has proposed to him, and transforming into a giant cat. Count Collection and company also want the ring, and a battle ensues. It is up to the Sparrow Squad to get the ring back.
24	19	"Is Food Cooked With Love a Little Extreme?!"(The Eel Thing); Transliteration: "ai no ryouri wa choppiri kageki !?" (Japanese: 愛の料理はちょっぴり過激!?)	June 19, 2000	February 9, 2002
It is the Knights versus Count Collection and company again, but this time in a cooking battle!
25	20	"Your Smile, Again and Again"(Mirror Mirror Off the Wall); Transliteration: "KIMI no egao wo nidosando" (Japanese: キミの笑顔を二度三度)	June 26, 2000 (June 9, 2020 (DVD))	February 16, 2002
Collection uses the Mirror of Lies to change the forms of Ichiroubei and the Knights.
26	21	"Rainbow Emerging From a Break in the Darkness"(Secret Orbs and Spices); Transliteration: "yami no kirema ni kakaru niji" (Japanese: 闇の切れ間にかかる虹)	July 3, 2000	February 23, 2002
Sacher, the fallen angel, tries to prove that the Mon Colle Knights would betray their comrades.
27	22	"Right On With a Leprechaun!"(Something Snaky This Way Comes); Transliteration: "REPURAKOUN de bacchigu-!" (Japanese: レプラコーンでばっちぐー!)	July 10, 2000	March 2, 2002
Count Collection and company finally get a cute mascot of their own, a Leprechaun who likes to blow up their ship.
28	23	"Waveriding Summer at Paradise Beach"(Try, Try, Triathlon); Transliteration: "paraiso BIICHI de naminori SAMAA" (Japanese: ぱらいそビーチで波乗りサマー)	July 17, 2000	March 9, 2002
Mondo enters the grueling Gillmen Triathlon.
29	24	"Welcome to Six Gates Academy"(Experts Beginning Knights); Transliteration: "oide mase mase rokumon gakuen" (Japanese: おいでませませ六門学園)	July 24, 2000	March 16, 2002
Mondo and Rokuna go to Six Gates Academy to learn how to be monster-summoning evocaters.
30	25	"Mon Colle Knights' Magic Training"(Practice Makes Messes); Transliteration: "mahou shugyou da MONKORENAITO" (Japanese: 魔法修行だモンコレナイト)	July 31, 2000	March 23, 2002
Collection tricks the lovelorn Luke into attacking Mondo.
31	26	"Mermaid Princess of the Sea Castle!"(Ogopogo Gone Loco); Transliteration: "umi no wo shiro no ningyo hime" (Japanese: 海のお城の人魚姫)	August 7, 2000	March 30, 2002
The Knights enjoy their time at the Pearl Mermaid Princess's castle until Collection causes a seaquake.
32	27	"Operation: Rose Room"(The Good, the Bad, and the Ugly); Transliteration: "BARA no oheya no dai sakusen" (Japanese: バラのおへやの大作戦)	August 14, 2000	April 6, 2002
Collection and company secretly help the Mon Colle Knights find a Mon Mon Item so they can steal it from them.
33	28	"Vampire of the Haunted House!"(The Vampire Strikes Back); Transliteration: "dokkiri kan no VANPAIA" (Japanese: どっきり館のヴァンパイア)	August 21, 2000	October 27, 2001
Mondo and Rokuna are trapped inside a haunted house, hunted by the vampiric creature Collection has become.
34	29	"The Huge Lovestar?!"(Attack of the Fifty Foot Lovestar); Transliteration: "DEKA DEKA dekkai RABUSUTAA!?" (Japanese: デカデカでっかいラブスター!?)	August 28, 2000 (June 9, 2020 (DVD))	April 13, 2002
A giant, ravenous Jahnay goes on the rampage in a forest village.
35	30	"The Mightiest Macho Man!"(One Step Ogre the Line); Transliteration: "BERIIMACCHO na saikyou yuusha" (Japanese: ベリーマッチョな最強勇者)	September 4, 2000	April 20, 2002
Somehow Collection becomes a macho man and enters the Mightiest Man Contest, a free-for-all brawl.
36	31	"One Giant Baseball Player!?"(The Mon World Series); Transliteration: "iwayuru hitotsu no JAIANTO!?" (Japanese: いわゆるひとつのジャイアント!?)	September 11, 2000	April 27, 2002
With a Mon Mon Item at stake, the Knights play baseball against Collection, who has a giant on his team.
37	32	"We're Useful Valkyries!"(Fowl Play); Transliteration: "oyaku ni tatsu desu! WARUKYURIA" (Japanese: お役にたつです!ワルキュリア)	September 18, 2000	May 4, 2002
The Valkyrie Girl Recruits return and despite their clumsiness, the Knights try to help them become full-fledged members.
38	33	"The Wind and Rokuna's Fairy Tale"(Fairy, Fairy, Quite Contrary); Transliteration: "kaze to rokudai no FEARII TEERU" (Japanese: 風と六奈のフェアリーテール)	September 25, 2000	June 15, 2002
Rokuna's dream comes true when she gets to meet fairies in Six Gates, but Collection spoils things by unleashing Bahamut, an ornery wind dragon.
39	34	"The Great Battle Beyond the Wave!"(Touched by a Mondo Part 1); Transliteration: "oonami koete dai BATORU!" (Japanese: 大波越えて大バトル!)	October 2, 2000	May 11, 2002
Tiamat sponsors a water-based monster battle, with a Mon Mon Item in the balance, but something lurks behind the scenes...
40	35	"Uneasiness of the Highest Order!"(Touched by a Mondo Part 2); Transliteration: "saidai kyuu no munasawagi!" (Japanese: 最大級の胸さわぎ!)	October 9, 2000	May 18, 2002
Rokuna must continue the fight, even when it seems Mondo is gone for good.
41	36	"Luke's Lovey-dovey Mission!"(Sheep Trick); Transliteration: "RUUKU no RABURABU dai sakusen!" (Japanese: ルークのラブラブ大作戦!)	October 16, 2000	May 25, 2002
While on a journey as part of their magical training, Luke tries to find an item that will give him the courage to tell Beginner how he feels about her.
42	37	"Clash! Ichiroubei Versus Collection"(All You Need is Lava); Transliteration: "gekitotsu! ichi rou hyoue VS KOREKUSHON" (Japanese: 激突!一郎兵衛VSコレクション)	October 23, 2000	June 1, 2002
It is Ichiroubei versus Collection, one on one, as they search for a Mon Mon Item in a land of scorching heat.
43	38	"Cleaning Kikimora"(Cleanliness is Next to Mondoness); Transliteration: "osou jishimasu KIKIIMORA" (Japanese: おそうじしますキキーモラ)	October 30, 2000	June 8, 2002
The Mon Colle Knights help the neat freak fairy, Kikimora, when Collection steals her magic broom.
44	39	"The Wandering Tan-Tan Detector"(Grin and Bear It); Transliteration: "sasurai no TANTAN tanchiki" (Japanese: さすらいのタンタン探知器)	November 6, 2000	June 15, 2002
Some Kobold scientists retrieve Collection's abandoned Tan-Tan-Tanuki Detector and bring it to life.
45	40	"Gokumare's Ultra-Grand Adventure!"(Loon Struck); Transliteration: "chou gokumare na dai bouken!" (Japanese: 超ごくまれな大冒険!)	November 13, 2000	June 22, 2002
Gokumare meets the man of her dreams in a "magical forest," but gets more than she bargains for.
46	41	"Explosive Heat! Fire Dragon"(That Worm Feeling); Transliteration: "bakunetsu! FAIA・DORAGON" (Japanese: 爆熱!ファイア・ドラゴン)	November 20, 2000	June 29, 2002
Mondo and Rokuna want to make friends with Fire Dragon, but it only seems interested in burning them to a crisp.
47	42	"The Birth of the Ultimate Flaming Dragon!"(Redda Returns); Transliteration: "tanjou! honoo no kyuukyoku DORAGON" (Japanese: 誕生!炎の究極ドラゴン)	November 27, 2000	July 6, 2002
The Mon Colle Knights are in the fight of their lives against the demonic magic of Reda, the Angel of Red Death.
48	43	"Showdown! The Angel of Red Death's Trap"(Calling All Monsters); Transliteration: "kessen! akakishi no wana" (Japanese: 決戦!赤き死の罠)	December 4, 2000	July 20, 2002
Reda abducts Rokuna and takes her to the demonic domain.
49	44	"The Gathering of the Six Mon Mon Items!"(The Last Monster Item); Transliteration: "shuuketsu! muttsu no MONMONAITEMU" (Japanese: 集結!六つのモンモンアイテム)	December 11, 2000	July 27, 2002
Mondo and his allies journey to the Charon Zone to rescue Rokuna, but they fall one by one before the might of the Terror Dragon.
50	45	"The Vanishing World of Six Gates"(The End of Mon World as We Know It); Transliteration: "kieru rokumon sekai" (Japanese: 消える六門世界)	December 18, 2000	August 3, 2002
The world of Six Gates is about to be wiped out as the Master of Time returns.
51	46	"That Brilliance Is a Diamond"(The Prophecy of the Golden Dragon); Transliteration: "kagayaki wa DAIYAMONDO" (Japanese: 輝きはダイヤモンド)	December 25, 2000	August 10, 2002
It is the final showdown between the Mon Colle Knights and the extra-dimensional Ouroboros.

== Staff ==
=== Japanese crew ===
- Original Setting: Hitoshi Yasuda / Group SNE
- Original Story: Satoru Akahori + Hasegawa Katsumi
- General Creation: Satoru Akahori
- Series Composition: Hasegawa Katsumi
- Original Characters: Hideaki Nishikawa
- Character Design: Atsuko Nakajima
- Director: Yasunao Aoki
- Mechanical Design: Aoki Tomoyoshi
- Item Design: Yamagata Atsushi
- Production Design: Miyazaki Shiniti
- Art Director: Akutsu Mitiyo + Motoki Nagayoshi Yuki
- Color Design: Takeshi Mochida
- Director of Photography: Okino Masahide
- Music: Hiroshi Sakamoto
- Sound Director: Tanaka Kazuya
- Producer: Higashi Fukashi + Ikeda Shin'ichi + Noguchi Kazunori
- Production: TV Tokyo, Yomiko, Studio Deen

=== English crew ===
- Tony Oliver: Voice Director
- Scott Page-Pagter: Voice Director
- Michael Sorich: Voice Director

== Adaptations ==
=== Card games ===
Group SNE developed the game based on the series.

- Mon-Colle-Knight official card game
- Mon-Colle-Knight official card game powerup card set 1

=== Video games ===
- Mumon Tengai Monokore Knight GB ("Mon-Colle-Knight GB") (Game Boy color)
