= Sorcerer Hunters =

Japanese light novel and manga series

- Cover

爆れつハンター (Bakuretsu Hantā)
- Genre: Comedy; Sword and sorcery
- Light novel
- Written by: Satoru Akahori
- Published by: Shufunotomo
- Imprint: Dengeki Bunko
- Original run: August 10, 1993 – April 20, 1996
- Volumes: 6
- Manga
- Written by: Satoru Akahori
- Illustrated by: Ray Omishi
- Published by: MediaWorks
- English publisher: NA: Tokyopop (2003–2011)
- Magazine: Comic Comp (1993-1994); Dengeki Comic Gao! (1994-1998)
- English magazine: US: MixxZine
- Original run: August 1993 – October 1998
- Volumes: 13
- Anime television series
- Directed by: Kōichi Mashimo
- Written by: Hiroyuki Kawasaki
- Music by: Kenji Kawai
- Studio: Xebec
- Licensed by: NA: Discotek Media
- Original network: TXN (TV Tokyo)
- English network: PH: ABS-CBN, GMA Network
- Original run: October 3, 1995 – March 26, 1996
- Episodes: 26
- Light novel

Sorcerer Hunt: Sorcerer Hunters Special
- Written by: Satoru Akahori
- Published by: Shufunotomo
- Imprint: Dengeki Bunko
- Original run: February 15, 1996 – August 25, 1996
- Volumes: 3
- Original video animation
- Directed by: Takao Kato
- Music by: Kenji Kawai
- Studio: Xebec
- Licensed by: NA: Discotek Media
- Released: December 21, 1996 – April 23, 1997
- Runtime: 29 minutes each
- Episodes: 3
- Spin-off
- Sorcerer on the Rocks

Sorcerer Hunters (爆れつハンター, Bakuretsu Hantā) is a Japanese light novel and manga series, written by Satoru Akahori and illustrated by Ray Omishi. Akahori and Omishi also published Sorcerer Hunters Special, a one-volume story set sometime after the series' conclusion.

In the United States the manga was serialized in MixxZine, replacing Ice Blade, which had ended.

== Plot ==
Sorcerer Hunters is set on the Spooner Continent, where the populace is divided into two groups: the ordinary people, called the Parsoners, and the magic users, the Sorcerers. Marked by the triangles on their foreheads, many Sorcerers dominate, exploit, torment, murder, and enslave the Parsoners of the Spooner Continent.

The Sorcerer Hunters are a group of warriors who protect humans from the Sorcerers. They are under the command of a holy woman who goes by the name of "Big Mama", the head of the popular Stella Church, who seeks to protect Parsoners from the gifted Sorcerers who have chosen to abuse their powers.

The plot focuses on the adventures of a small family group of Sorcerer Hunters, including the Glacé brothers (Carrot and Marron), their childhood friends, the Misu sisters (Tira and her older sister Chocola), and Gateau Mocha.

== Characters ==
=== Main ===
Carrot Glacé (キャロット·グラッセ, Kyarotto Gurasse)

- Voiced by: Shinnosuke Furumoto (Japanese); Brett Weaver (English)

The primary protagonist and the de facto leader of the Sorcerer Hunters, Carrot is an apparently powerless boy who carries a longsword, but almost never uses it due to extreme imprecision. However, he does have one ace in the hole. When he comes into contact with a Sorcerer's magic, his Aranju and Zoanthropy activate one of his 12 beast genes and transform him into a giant, out-of-control monster. It takes Tira Misu to bring him back to his normal state in the animated series; in the manga, she wears Carrot's monster form down while his brother Marron pulls the magic out of Carrot. Carrot's forms are based on the animals of the Chinese zodiac, and he has been known to transform twice during a fight.

Carrot is a lascivious pervert with a ravenous libido; he propositions nearly every woman he sees with either a date or sex. In fact, the only two women whom he does not pursue are Tira and Chocola, who really love him, and both of them take great offense to Carrot's lustful pursuits. In his defense, Carrot doesn't view himself as being unfaithful to the Misu sisters; he has a brotherly love for them rather than a romantic type, and he feels uneasy with the notion of being with Tira or Chocola romantically and thus, uses this rationale to chase after other girls. Unfortunately, this doesn't sit very well with the sisters, who think he ignores their affections. As a result, when they are not in battle with sorcerers, Carrot is often the victim of the Misu sisters' barrage of whippings as punishment for his constant infidelity (or what they perceive as infidelity) towards them, which is another reason Carrot fears both the sisters. Later in the series, he professes his love to both Tira and Chocola and even marries Tira at the end of the manga. However, even though Chocola let her sister marry him, she's still bound and determined to bear Carrot's first child.

Marron Glacé (マロン·グラッセ, Maron Gurasse)

- Voiced by: Mitsuaki Madono (Japanese); Jason Douglas (English)

Marron is Carrot's younger brother, although he appears to be older due to his height, as well as his docile, mature manner. Unlike Carrot, Marron is a gentleman. He is an expert practitioner of Eastern style magic, which does not require one to be born a Sorcerer. He can conjure the Four Symbols. Marron is also a very skilled swordsman, but he rarely uses his sword skills. He is pursued by Gateau because of his beauty. Despite being a male he's beautiful enough to catch Gateau's attention. While he seems to mostly ignore Gateau's advances, there is a running gag with his overt, suspicious affection for his older brother, more pronounced in the manga than the anime. Marron is said to be gay but is really more asexual.

Growing up, Carrot always protected Marron from other kids who bullied him on account of his rather feminine looks. Now in their teens, Marron returns the favor by taking out anyone who harms him, his friends, and especially his older brother Carrot.

Though powerful, Marron does have some weak points shown better in the manga, such as a total lack of tolerance for alcohol. He's named after the European confection.

Gateau Mocha (ガトー·モカ, Gatō Moka)

- Voiced by: Kiyoyuki Yanada (Japanese); Chris Corey (episode 1-14), Andrew Klimko (episode 15-26) (English)

The oldest of the five Sorcerer Hunters, Gateau was not raised in the Sorcerer Hunters' village on Mt. Saint Hordic; as a result, he is one of the few to join in adulthood (in the anime, he and Éclair grew up with the Glace brothers and Misu sisters). His advantage is immense physical strength due to a lifetime of martial arts training; he is also partially immune to magic due to that strength. Gateau's parents were killed by Sacher Torte, and his younger sister Eclair was abducted at that time; shortly afterwards, he met Chocola and joined her team.

Gateau is excessively macho and also bisexual, as shown in the manga by his statement "Beauty transcends gender." He also has a libido that nearly rivals that of Carrot, the only main character to whom Gateau has no attraction. Unlike Carrot, however, Gateau knows when to put his libido in check.

Gateau's main hobby is exhibitionism, often stripping to a speedo and posing, accompanied by a cry of "Look at meee!" There's a running gag with him openly showing attraction to Marron due to his physical beauty, only to be ignored by the younger mystic.

His first name means "cake" in French.

Tira Misu (ティラ·ミス, Tira Misu)

- Voiced by: Megumi Hayashibara (Japanese); Tamara Lo (English)

Tira, along with Chocola, was raised by Carrot and Marron's father and mother, Onion and Apricot. She resembles Little Red Riding Hood, dressed in an oversized cloak and glasses.

She seems very meek and shy, but reveals a bolder side of her personality in combat, pulling away her cloak and revealing her whip and leather Dominatrix gear. She is very skilled with the whip and is the one who usually beats Carrot down after he transforms, turning him back to human form in the anime.

Tira is deeply in love with Carrot, but due to her shy nature she isn't very up front until later in the manga, so her love for Carrot is an open secret. Tira gets jealous when Carrot lusts after other girls, and along with her sister Chocola, she whips Carrot as punishment for his constant skirt-chasing. Tira even gets miffed when she sees Chocola incessantly flirting with Carrot.

In battle, Tira occasionally uses a whip. She also has basic knowledge of Gaia's magic, which is derived from nature; magic she learned from Apricot Glace, though she is only able to heal with it. Her dominatrix attire in the manga and OVAs is the traditional ensemble consisting of black leather stiletto-heel boots, bustiers, corsets, and spiked dog chains. Her anime attire, however, has a more colorful style, consisting of a tight, skimpy, orange and white leotard with an emerald "tie", white gloves and heels. In the manga, her dominatrix outfit changes often—sometimes even during the same story. In the anime, she appeared in her manga outfit after being reborn.

At the end of the manga, Tira finally admits her love to Carrot and marries him.

Her name is a pun on the Italian dessert.

Chocola Misu (ショコラ·ミス, Shokora Misu; Chocolate Misu in ADV dub)

- Voiced by: Yuko Mizutani (Japanese); Tiffany Grant (English)

Chocola is the sexy, straightforward, sometimes high-maintenance, short-tempered and somewhat nymphomaniac older sister of Tira. She is madly in love with Carrot (whom she calls "Darling" although there have been few times she's called Carrot by name) and literally throws herself at him. Often, Carrot is petrified of her and flees from her advances. Still, she keeps a close bond with Tira, protecting her when it's needed and fighting in her name. She and Gateau are a separate team early in the manga, but eventually all five form a single group.

Chocola is a dominatrix like Tira, but is far more violent and savage than her sister, and is also able to turn Carrot back to normal in the anime—after beating him up even harder than Tira. Her main weapon is her garrote and she is incredibly skilled with it. It is suggested that her character was inspired by Lum from Urusei Yatsura.

Chocola's dominatrix attire in the manga and OVAs resembles that of a Nazi German soldier. It consists of a leather cap (with the Nazi symbols of the eagle carrying the swastika as well as the Gestapo Death's Head), suspenders that barely covers her nipples, leather pants and boots (her dominatrix attire in the manga and OVAs is also reminiscent of that worn by Charlotte Rampling in the 1974 film The Night Porter). However, in the anime television series, her attire is more reflective of a biker: a slightly modest red leather bra top, along with similar leather pants, boots and cap (sans the Nazi symbol), with red gloves. At the end of the anime, after being reborn, Chocola appears in her manga outfit with her sister.

Even though she loves Carrot sincerely, Chocola is a very jealous girl and is quite vicious and ferocious towards Carrot when she catches him cheating on her, and whips him mercilessly (though she is most vicious to those that harm her friends, in particular Tira and Carrot). Normally, however, she is very amorous and romantic towards him, always smothering him in deep love and affection, which is the reason Carrot keeps his distance from her between the two sisters. Chocola often has romantic/sexual dreams of her and Carrot together. These shōjoesque fantasies usually feature Carrot as very well-groomed and debonair-looking, as well as often ending in Carrot making love to her; in which she often goes into complete ecstasy. Oddly enough, her own image in these fantasies show her to be either meek or submissive, which is a big change from what she truly is.

At the end of the manga, Chocola allows her sister to marry Carrot, though that doesn't stop her from trying to seduce him and bearing his children.

An important part of the plot is that the five Sorcerer Hunters are reincarnations of five gods. They are:

- Carrot—Hakaishin, the god of Destruction (which explains his beast forms)
- Marron—Yaksha, the god of the East who carries a sword (explanation of Marron's rarely seen sword skills)
- Gateau—Karlman, the god of the North who resembles a god from Norse Mythology
- Tira—Apros, the goddess of the West who's also a healer
- Chocola—Qurin, the goddess of the South who resembles the Hindu goddess Kali

Carrot is the reincarnation of the Destruction god Hakaishin while the other four Hunters are the reincarnations of the four gods that subdued him, which explains why it takes Tira and/or Chocola as well as even Marron to bring Carrot back to his normal human form.

Big Mama (ビッグ·マム, Biggu Mamu)

- Voiced by: Sumi Shimamoto (Japanese), Sue Ulu (English, TV), Kelly Manison (English, OVA)

Big Mama is an imposing being with great magical abilities. Her real name is Kanure Stella and she, alongside Sacher Torte, formed the Sorcerer Hunters, and henceforth dedicated her life to the punishment of evil Sorcerers. The highest rank of the Sorcerer Hunters, the Haz Knights, are her personal bodyguards.

Daughter (ドーター, Dōtā)

- Voiced by: Sakiko Tamagawa (Japanese); Kira Vincent-Davis (English)

Also known as Dotta, she is Big Mama's messenger and assistant. She is one of only two survivors of the Winged People. She wears qipao, and usually has her hair up in small buns.

==== Haz Knights ====
The Haz Knights are the most elite Sorcerer Hunters, with amazing powers, augmented by magical armor. Mille is the first to appear in the manga, while the others don't appear until volumes nine, ten and eleven.

Mille Feuille (ミルフィー·ユ, Mirufī Yu)

- Voiced by: Yasuyuki Hirata (TV series), Megumi Ogata (OVA) (Japanese); Lew Temple (TV series), Chris Patton (OVA) (English)

Also known as Milphey-uy, he is a transvestite who most often acts with Carrot's group and has a thorough knowledge of necromancy and all kind of magic. His power comes from his Guardian Spirit, the Phoenix. He is pansexual and constantly flings himself at both Onion and Carrot, which draws more ire from Tira and Chocola, and flirts with them, though he's also shown some degree of interest in Gateau and Marron.

Cinnamon Tea (シナモン·コーチャ, Shinamon Kōcha)

A very youthful-looking blonde girl with a slow manner, she has the power of super speed.

Chiffon Cake (シフォン·ケーキ, Shifon Kēki)

He is a master of magical chemistry, using test tubes and flasks as powerful magic explosives, as well as for other offensive and defensive uses.

Kahlua Milk (カルーア·ミルク, Karūa Miruku)

This man is another highly skilled mystic, specializing in ice.

Onion Glacé (オニオン·グラッセ, Onion Gurasse)

- Voiced by: Shigeru Chiba (Japanese); Eric Opella (English)

A former Haz Knight who left the group to raise a family. He wields twin axes that can inflict serious damage. He married Apricot Anzu, a fellow hunter and is Carrot and Marron's father. His appearance is very similar to Carrot's, with the addition of a facial scar and a far more muscular body. After the death of Apricot, it seems he has become as much of a lecher as his oldest son, at times. Of the two he acts as if he dislikes Carrot, though adores Marron for the resemblance to his dead wife.

Abricot Glacé (née Anzu) (アプリコット·グラッセ, Apurikotto Gurasse)

A former Sorcerer Hunteress who can change into her own outfit and uses a knife as well as nature magic. She was "killed" long ago by the Lord of Darkness Almond Rasseru who possessed her body. However, her soul escaped and inhabited a new one—that of a female artificial human named Mousse. She becomes the head of the Stella Church at the end of the manga. She is Onion's wife and the Glace brothers' mother.

=== Supporting ===
Qui Shurein

A sorcerer of noble birth who is after the Crystal Magicians, who kidnapped his Parsoner girlfriend Audrey. He becomes an ally of the Sorcerer Hunters during the Crystal Magicians' story arc, although Gateau is reluctant to trust him. After the Magicians are defeated, he proposes to Audrey and vows to aid the Hunters whenever they ask.

Shicho

Nicknamed the "Butterfly of Death", Shicho is a kunoichi ally of the Soga Clan who has poison in her blood.

Potato Chips

- Voiced by: Kazue Ikura (Japanese); Mandy Clark (English)

A pint-sized sorcerer with a lisp, he looks far more like his father who makes an appearance in the manga.

Salad Chips

- Voiced by: Masami Toyoshima (Japanese); Monica Rial (English)

Salad Chips is Potato's short and rather young-looking mother. She is over 30 though looks no more than 12.

Grand Pa

An elder at the village of hunters who resembles Yoda from Star Wars, he offers wisdom and support to Sorcerer Hunters though his true identity has a far darker twist (see below in Enemies).

=== Enemies ===
The Crystal Magicians, who turn humans into gems used for mystical purposes. They are appropriately named after jewels.

- Sapphire Regal

The first of the Crystal Magicians to appear. He was responsible for kidnapping Qui Shurein's girlfriend Audrey and turning her into a gem. He tries to do the same to Carrot, but is killed by Gateau.

- Emerald Ren

The leader of the Crystal Magicians. Appearing initially as a mischievous young boy, he later reveals his true age and form (a centuries-old man) to the Sorcerer Hunters. He is killed by Carrot.

- Diamond Ra

The most powerful of the Crystal Magicians. He uses a magic void to draw Marron in, but is burned alive from within by Marron's phoenix spell.

- Ruby Rulan

Ra's lover. She kisses Carrot and Gateau to place them under her control. She later tries to trap Chocola into a crystal, but is impaled by Chocola's garotte.

Sacher Torte (ザッハ·トルテ, Zahha Torute) (pronounced "Zaha")

- Voiced by: Banjō Ginga (Japanese); Guil Lunde (1st), Randy Sparks (2nd) (English)

A sorcerer doctor and wielder of the Plantina Energy, he was once an ally of Big Mama. He helped found the Sorcerer Hunters, but eventually left because of differences between himself and Mama. He is Chocola and Tira's adoptive father. He's named after the Austrian dessert.

- Death Master

A powerful Necromancer. He seeks the "Necronomicon", a book that will give him absolute control over the dead. He is defeated by Carrot in his beast form and ultimately killed by Mille Feuille.

The Sorcerer Hunter Killers

- Steel Grey, who is made of liquid metal and can morph his body into a lethal weapon a la the T-1000 from T2.
- Moss Green, a female who has similar powers to Steel Grey.
- Gia Purple

The Five Guardian Spirits, assembled by Sacher to guard the Plantina Stones. They are named after stars.

- Artail
- Ice Vega, a master of ice and cold. It was inspired by the Batman supervillain Mr. Freeze.
- Sirius of the Wind, one of the Winged People. He falls in love with Daughter and eventually surrenders to the hunters. He goes to live with Daughter and they begin trying to make a family. In the OVA, he is voiced by Hiro Yuki in Japanese and Eric Opella in English.
- Kengyu Kiba, a living suit of samurai armor.
- Deneb, once Éclair Mocha, Gateu's younger sister. Sacher removed her memories, and she became Deneb of Sacher's guardian spirits. She has strength to rival her brother's and some magical abilities, she eventually regains her memory and goes to live at Mt. Saint Hordic with the Sorcerer Hunters. Her character designer admits her inspiration was Cammy from Street Fighter. In the OVA, she is voiced by Tomoko Ishimura in Japanese and Kelly Cooke in English.

Lendoll Carlsburg, the sonic gunslinger from the town of Tamales who gave the hunters all they could handle.

Four Lords of Darkness, ancient demons who once terrorized the world.

- Almond Rasseru, the bodiless one who possessed Carrot's mother. He is killed by Onion Glace.
- Gin Namba, the lover of Cashew Prize (Gran Pa), she chose to reform to stay with him.
- Cashew Prize, the most ruthless of the four who reformed and became Gran Pa.
- Cool Mint, had the power to conjure dead people.
- Charlotte Stella, Kanure's little brother who is virtually all powerful. Like Sacher Torte, he attempts to purify the world by reviving the God of Destruction within Carrot's body, but ultimately fails, and is instead killed by the deity.

== Adaptations ==
Sorcerer Hunters was later adapted into a 26-episode anime television series by Xebec, which was the studio's first production, and aired on TV Tokyo from October 3, 1995, to March 3, 1996. It was aired in the Philippines on ABS-CBN from 1998 to 1999 and re-aired by rival GMA Network in 2001 to 2004. In North America, the series was licensed by ADV Films up until the company's collapse in 2009. On May 25, 2019, Discotek Media licensed both the TV series and the OVA series.

The TV series was followed by a three-episode OVA, also by Xebec.

Sorcerer Hunters has three releases in dramatic audio format in which the main roles are all performed by the same actors as in the TV series and OVA. The first set, Sorcerer Hunters Whip I - V, was released on June 22, 1994. This was followed in 1995 by Sorcerer Hunters II, The Monthly Collection: 1st Season - 5th Season. The third set, Sorcerer Hunters SP, came out in 1996.

=== Video games ===
The series would also see numerous videogame releases starting with the adventure game Bakuretsu Hunter for the Sega Saturn by I'Max on April 26, 1996. Other titles based on the series include Bakuretsu Hunter Mahjong Special on October 25, 1996, and another adventure title Bakuretsu Hunter: Sorezore no Omoi...Nowānchatte on April 11, 1997, both by Banpresto for the Sony PlayStation, and a role-playing game Bakuretsu Hunter R for the Sega Saturn by King Records on August 8, 1997.

== Media ==
=== TV episode list ===
No.	Title	Original release date
1	"Float-Bridge of Love" "Ai no Nanba Hashi" (愛のなんぱ橋)	October 3, 1995
2	"Red Flower of Life" "Inochi Meshimase Akaki Hana" (命召しませ紅花 [あかきはな])	October 10, 1995
3	"Unwritten Laws about Light and Dark" "Kage to Hikari no Fubunritsu" (影と光の不文律)	October 17, 1995
4	"Fireworks Competition of Love" "Ai no Hanabi Daikai da" (愛の花火大会だ)	October 24, 1995
5	"A Dreamy Girl at Lakeside" "Kohan no Yume Shōjo" (湖畔の夢少女)	October 31, 1995
6	"Heresy of Love is Crystal" "Itan no Ai wa Kurisutaru" (異端の愛は水晶 [クリスタル])	November 7, 1995
7	"Love, as it Drifts" "Ai, Nagareru mama" (愛、流れるまま)	November 14, 1995
8	"The Forbidden Fire" "Kinjirareta Honō" (禁じられた炎)	November 21, 1995
9	"Labyrinth Opera House" "Meikyū he no Opera Hausu" (迷宮への歌劇場 [オペラハウス])	November 28, 1995
10	"To Love a Vagabond" "Koisuredo Fūraibō" (恋すれど風来坊)	December 5, 1995
11	"Forbidden Fruit" "Yurusarezaru Kajitsu" (許されざる果実)	December 12, 1995
12	"The Fossilized Warrior" "Kaseki no Yūsha" (化石の勇者)	December 19, 1995
13	"In Between Dreams and Reality" "Yume to Utsutsu no Hazama de" (夢と現 [うつつ] の間 [はざま] で)	December 26, 1995
14	"God's a Big Fool" "Kamisama wa Dai Tawake" (神様は大たわけ)	January 2, 1996
15	"The First Reunion" "Somete no Saikai" (初めての再会)	January 9, 1996
16	"The Great Hospital of Love" "Ai no Dai Byōin da" (愛の大病院だ)	January 16, 1996
17	"Big Mama Once Again" "Mamu, Futatabi..." (マム、再び...)	January 23, 1996
18	"The Gods Within" "Himerareshi Kamigami" (秘められし神々)	January 30, 1996
19	"Darling is a Love-Stricken Ass" "Mahoroba no Dārin" (まほろばの恋人[ダーリン])	February 6, 1996
20	"The Boy Has Seen It" "Shōnen wa Mita" (少年は見た)	February 13, 1996
21	"A Sleepless Night" "Nemurenai Yoru" (眠れない夜)	February 20, 1996
22	"Sorcerer Hunter Spirits" "Sōsarāhantā Supirittsu" (法族狩り精神 [ソーサラーハンター·スピリッツ])	February 27, 1996
23	"The Foible of Kindness" "Yashisa no Haiboku" (優しさの敗北)	March 5, 1996
24	"Overture of Destruction" "Hametsu he no Jokyoku" (破滅への序曲)	March 12, 1996
25	"The Awakening of the Destroyer" "Hakai Kami Fukkatsu" (破壊神復活)	March 19, 1996
26	"A Forgotten Piece from the Future" "Mirai kara no Wasuremono" (未来からの忘れ物)	March 26, 1996
27	"The Night of the Night Visits" "Yobai to Yobai to Kusaki mo Nabiku" (夜這いと夜這いと草木もなびく)	December 21, 1996 (Direct-to-video)
28	"Necromancer's Evil Instruction Book" "Shiryō-bin I no Madōsho" (死霊便いの魔導書)	February 21, 1997 (Direct-to-video)
29	"Under the Tree of Memories" "Omoide no Ki no Shitade" (思い出の樹の下で)	April 23, 1997 (Direct-to-video)

=== Music ===
Opening theme

- "What's Up Guys?"

Lyrics by: Miho Matsuba
Composition by: Sho Goshima and Toshiro Yabuki
Arrangement by: Toshiro Yabuki
Song by: Shinnosuke Furumoto and Megumi Hayashibara

Ending theme

- "MASK"

Lyrics and composition by: Masami Okui
Arrangement by: Toshiro Yabuki and Tsutomu Ohira
Song by: Masami Okui and Kasumi Matsumura
