= Omishi Magical Theater: Risky Safety =

Japanese manga and television series

臣士魔法劇場リスキー☆セフティ (Omishi Mahou Gekijou: Risky/Safety)
- Genre: Comedy, magical girl
- Manga
- Written by: Rei Omishi
- Published by: MediaWorks
- Magazine: Dengeki Comic Gao!
- Original run: 1999 – 2000
- Volumes: 3
- Anime television series
- Directed by: Koji Masunari
- Written by: Yōsuke Kuroda
- Studio: A.P.P.P.
- Licensed by: US: AN Entertainment
- Original network: Wowow
- Original run: 5 October 1999 – 4 April 2000
- Episodes: 24

Omishi Magical Theater: Risky Safety (臣士魔法劇場 リスキー☆セフティ, Omishi Mahou Gekijou: Risky/Safety) is a manga series created by Rei Omishi and follows the journeys of an apprentice shinigami, or death god, named Risky and an apprentice angel named Safety who have been trapped in the same body. Whoever is in charge of the body depends on the emotions of those around them; if people are happy, then Safety appears, but if people are upset, then Risky takes charge.

== Characters ==
Risky
A shinigami in training, Risky takes to her job quite gleefully. She is robed in a skull studded black outfit with a jewel in the center, long black stockings, and a large hat that looks like a cross between a ten-gallon hat and a stereotypical witch's hat. She has black hair and dark blue-grey eyes. She wields a scythe that, among other things, can take the souls of the living who are filled with sadness, present illusions dealing with the cause of the current target's sadness, and act as a microphone. Risky is not as cruel as she leads people to think, since she tried to undo the damage she did in Moe's room when she first arrived when she was given a new assignment.

Safety
An angel in training, Safety takes just as much joy bringing happiness and blessings as Risky does taking souls. She wears a simple white robe, with a small jewel and collar as the only things that stick out. She also has a jewel on her forehead. She has long blue-green hair, which she ties up in pink bands, and slightly darker blue-green eyes. She is near-sighted, so she must wear glasses. She can summon a bow and arrow which acts like Cupid's arrow, causing anyone to fall in love with the first person they see. Thanks to a passing ambulance, she hit a neighbor's dog, Lani, with it.

Moe Katsuragi
She starts off in the series depressed because the boy she likes seems to be interested in other women. This depression summons Risky. Thanks to a small compliment to Risky, Safety takes over and sets the record straight.

Yuya Fukami
Moe's de facto boyfriend, Yuya is a sweet younger boy whom she met at a phone booth, when she forgot her phone card and he returned it.

Lani
A dog that, thanks to Safety's arrow, is infatuated with Risky and Safety.

== Voices ==
Risky

Voiced by: Rie Iwatsubo (Japanese); Sandy Fox (English)

Safety

Voiced by: Rie Iwatsubo (Japanese); Michelle Ruff (English)

Moe Katsuragi

Voiced by: Maaya Sakamoto (Japanese); Julie Ann Taylor (English)

Yuya Fukami

Voiced by: Akiko Yajima (Japanese); Mona Marshall (English)

Lani

Voiced by: Wendee Lee

Fazzy Serges

Voiced by: Yuri Shiratori (Japanese); Dorothy Elias-Fahn (English)

Mrs. Katsuragi

Voiced by: Yuriko Yamaguchi (Japanese); Wendee Lee (English)

Mr. Katsuragi

Voiced by: Masaya Onosaka (Japanese); Kirk Thornton (English)

== Manga before anime ==
There are three manga publications that were issued before this anime under the same name (Omishi Magical Theater: Risky Safety), created by Rei Omishi.

There are a few differences between the manga and the anime. The greatest difference is that the stories in the manga do not concentrate on one person (i.e. Risky and Safety travel around), while anime is focused on Moe Katsuragi.

Other differences include:

- The clothing and its colours of Risky and Safety have minor changes, like:
  - Risky's main colour of dressing is crimson in the manga instead of grey in the anime.
  - Safety's hair is blue in the manga but cyan in the anime.
- Risky and Safety are both 13 cm (as stated in the official site) in the anime, while in the manga version, they are of normal human height.
- In the manga, Moe Katsuragi usually wears her eyeglasses, but in the anime, she wears contact lenses when she goes to school or when she meets Yuya Fukami.
