= Akahori Gedou Hour Rabuge =

Anime television series

- Akahori's Heretical Hours: Love Games

あかほり外道アワーらぶげ (Akahori Gedō Awā Rabuge)
- Genre: Comedy, Magical girl
- Anime television series
- Directed by: Hitoyuki Matsui
- Written by: Satoru Akahori
- Studio: Radix Ace Entertainment
- Original network: AT-X, BS Asahi, KBS Kyoto, Tokyo MX, TV Kanagawa
- Original run: July 5, 2005 – September 27, 2005
- Episodes: 13
- icon

Akahori's Heretical Hours: Love Games (あかほり外道アワーらぶげ, Akahori Gedō Awā Rabuge) is a Japanese anime series that combined episodes of two series, Let's Go! Heretic Girls Squad (それゆけ!外道乙女隊, Soreyuke! Gedō Otometai) and Absolute Justice: Love Pheromones (絶対正義ラブフェロモン, Zettai Seigi Rabu Feromon). It was broadcast in 13 episodes between July 5, 2005, and September 27, 2005.

== Summary ==
In Love Pheromones, Aimi and Kaoruko are wannabe comedians and heroes of justice. As their manager, Tomokazu Seki, attempts to find them a job so they can rise to superstardom, they take part-time jobs as superheroine duo "Love Pheromones". They battle various evil, but as they destroy half the city every time, this leads to them being mistaken for evil creatures and feared by everyone.

The other half of the show, Heretic Girls Squad tells the story of the five Hokke sisters, who were abandoned by their now-deceased parents, and live in perpetual poverty. The family consists of, from oldest to youngest, Otone, Maika, Yoku, Kanashi, and Utano. One day, they release Akumako, an imp who was sealed in a vase left behind by their father. Akumako tells them that their parents belonged to an evil organisation, and that to carry on their parents' wishes, they must become "evil". To attempt this, they become the Gedou Otome Tai, a team of Magical Girls bent on carrying out evil. All their efforts end up helping somebody, and they are mistakenly thought of as heroes.

A recurring theme in Akahori Gedou Hour Rabuge is mistaken identity: both groups of girls are thought of as villains and heroes respectively. Another theme is following one's dreams, whether they are of being the world's greatest evil or being a famous comedy duo and having legions of fans.

== Episode lists ==
Most of the episodes consist of two stories, one for Aimi and Kaoruko (Love Pheromones) and one for the Hokke sisters (Heretic Girls Squad), although occasionally they meet and interact with each other. In episodes 12 and 13, the stories merge into one as both groups act together against a common enemy.

| # | Title | Animation Director | Screenwriter | Storyboard | Original release date |
|---|---|---|---|---|---|
| 1 | "Openly Forgiving, Love Pheromones! Operation Rain Rain Fall Fall!" "Tenka Gomen Da Rabu Feromon! Ameame Furefure Dai Sakusen!" (Japanese: 天下御免だラブフェロモン! アメアメフレフレ大作戦!) | Koji Watanabe | Satoru Akahori | Hitoyuki Matsui | July 5, 2005 |
| 2 | "Poor! Operation Tomorrow is Salary Day at Part-Time Job! Love Pheromones, Once Again Being Self-Righteous Today!" "Binbō! Kyūryōbi Mae Baito Daisakusen! Kyō mo Katte da Rabu Feromon!" (Japanese: ビンボー! 給料日前バイト大作戦! 今日も勝手だラブフェロモン!) | Shinichi Yoshino | Satoru Akahori | Shoichiro Goto | July 12, 2005 |
| 3 | "Operation Letter from That Day! Vs. Meow-Meow Love Pheromones!" "VS Nyan Nyan da Rabu Feromon! Ano Hino o Tegami Dai Sakusen!" (Japanese: VSにゃんにゃんだラブフェロモン! あの日のお手紙大作戦!) | Kazuyuki Matsubara | Deko Akao | Jun Takada, Masahiro Sonoda | July 19, 2005 |
| 4 | "Scary! Operation CicadaMan! I Was Blinking, Love Pheromones!" "Kyōfu! Semi Otoko Dai Sakusen! Matatakishitetara Rabu Feromon!" (Japanese: 恐怖! セミ男大作戦! 瞬きしてたらラブフェロモン!) | Junko Watanabe | Takashi Ifukube | Shoichiro Goto | July 26, 2005 |
| 5 | "Being a Man is Hard, Sekii Man! Work Force Chaos! Operation Voice Actors Debut!" "Otoko wa Tsurai yo, Sekii Man! Gyōkai Sōzen! Seiyū Debyū Dai Sakusen!" (Japanese: 男はつらいよセキーマン! 業界騒然! 声優デビュー大作戦!) | Hikari Daigo, Shigeru Kato | Takashi Ifukube | Naoki Kusunoki, Mochio | August 2, 2005 |
| 6 | "It's a Squid Wrestler! Love Pheromones! Operation They're New Employees!" "Ika Wrestler da! Rabu Feromon! Shinnyū Shain da! Dai Sakusen!" (Japanese: イカレスラーだ! ラブフェロモン! 新入社員だ! 大作戦!) | Naoki Aisaka | Katsumi Hasegawa | Takashi Iwama, Shoichiro Goto | August 9, 2005 |
| 7 | "Operation Let's Sing Love Sky High! Swim Suit Falls Off, Love Pheromones!" "Soratakaku Ai o Utaō Dai Sakusen! Mizugi de Porori da, Rabu Feromon!" (Japanese: 空高く愛を歌おう大作戦! 水着でポロリだラブフェロモン!) | Chiyoko Sakamoto, Yuka Hasegawa | Keiji Hanasaki, Deko Akao, Satoru Akahori | Hisashi Ishii, Takashi Iwama | August 16, 2005 |
| 8 | "It's Eating Wars! Love Pheromones! Operation of Evil Broadcast Station Invasion!" "Oogui Wōzu da! Rabu Feromon! Aku no Hōsōkuku Nottori Dai Sakusen!" (Japanese: 大食いウォーズだ! ラブフェロモン! 悪の放送局乗っ取り大作戦!) | Junko Watanabe | Takashi Ifukube | Baku Tsuzuri, Shoichiro Goto | August 23, 2005 |
| 9 | "Operation Big Monsters Big Advance! It's a Lovely Romance! Love Pheromones!" "Dai Kaijū Dai Shingeki Dai Sakusen! Rabu Romansu da yo! Rabu Feromon!" (Japanese: 大怪獣大進撃大作戦! ラブロマンスだよ! ラブフェロモン!) | Hiroto Kato, Masanori Osawa (Mecha) | Masaki Hiramatsu, Katsumi Hasegawa | Hiroto Kato, Shoichiro Goto | August 30, 2005 |
| 10 | "Operation Bang Bang! Is it a media mix! Love Pheromones! That's Old!" "Baban Baban de Dai Sakusen! Mediamikkusu ka yo! Rabu Feromon! Fū" (Japanese: ババンババンで大作戦! メディアミックスかよ! ラブフェロモン! 古っ) | Shigeru Kato, Yoshiaki Kameda | Deko Akao, Katsumi Hasegawa | Shoichiro Goto, Baku Tsuzuri | September 6, 2005 |
| 11 | "Moe-1 Victory? Love Pheromones! Operation Secret Nap!" "Moe-1 Yūshō? Rabu Feromon! Himitsu no o Nenne Dai Sakusen!" (Japanese: Moe-1優勝? ラブフェロモン! 秘密のおねんね大作戦!) | Naoki Aisaka | Takashi Ifukube | Takashi Iwama | September 13, 2005 |
| 12 | "It's the Last Day of the Earth! Love Pheromones!" "Chikyū Saigo no Hi Da yo, Rabu Feromon!" (Japanese: 地球最後の日だよラブフェロモン!) | Junko Watanabe | Satoru Akahori | Shoichiro Goto | September 20, 2005 |
| 13 | "Evil Forever! Operation Definite Justice!" "Aku yo Eien ni! Zettai Seigi Dai Sakusen!" (Japanese: 悪よ永遠に! 絶対正義大作戦!) | Koji Watanabe, Satoshi Ishino | Satoru Akahori | Takashi Iwama, Hitoyuki Matsui | September 27, 2005 |
