= Maze (novel) =

Japanese media franchise

- Cover of the first manga volume

MAZE☆爆熱時空 (Meizu Bakunetsu Jikū)
- Genre: Action, comedy, fantasy, isekai
- Light novel
- Written by: Satoru Akahori
- Illustrated by: Eiji Suganuma
- Published by: Kadokawa Shoten
- Imprint: Kadokawa Sneaker Bunko
- Original run: July 27, 1993 – March 26, 1998
- Volumes: 13
- Manga

Chouse Kitan Maze Bakunetsu Jikuu
- Written by: Satoru Akahori
- Illustrated by: Rei Omishi
- Published by: Fujimi Shobo
- Magazine: Comic Dragon
- Original run: October 1995 – December 1999
- Volumes: 6
- Original video animation
- Directed by: Iku Suzuki
- Studio: J.C.Staff
- Licensed by: NA: Software Sculptors
- Released: July 24, 1996 – September 21, 1996
- Runtime: 30 minutes each
- Episodes: 2
- Anime television series
- Directed by: Iku Suzuki
- Written by: Katsumi Hasegawa
- Studio: J.C.Staff
- Licensed by: NA: Software Sculptors
- Original network: TXN (TV Tokyo), BBC, TVN, WTV, SBS, AT-X
- English network: US: Anime Selects
- Original run: April 2, 1997 – September 24, 1997
- Episodes: 25
- Anime film

Maze Bakunetsu Jikū: Tenpen Kyōi no Giant
- Directed by: Iku Suzuki
- Written by: Satoru Akahori
- Music by: Norimasa Yamanaka
- Studio: J.C.Staff
- Released: April 25, 1998
- Runtime: 42 minutes

Maze: The Mega-Burst Space (Japanese: MAZE☆爆熱時空, Hepburn: Meizu Bakunetsu Jikū) is a Japanese light novel series written by Satoru Akahori and illustrated by Eiji Suganuma. The series was published by Kadokawa Shoten from July 27, 1993, to March 26, 1998. Based on The Wonderful Wizard of Oz, the series originally began as Ijikū GyōKitan OZ (異時空行奇談OZ, Ijikū Gyō Kidan OZ; transl. OZ: Extra-Dimensional Tales of Time and Space), a manga serialized in Comic JAM and published by Tairiku Shobo in 1986–1988. It was illustrated by Kia Asamiya, whose debut manga series Shinseiki Vagrants was being serialized in Kadokawa's Monthly Comic Comp at the same time. The series was published in the magazine's first three issues and left unfinished due to Tairiku Shobo going bankrupt in August 1992, with all chapters being published in Movic's side-A in 1996. It was then serialized in Hobby Japan's RPG Magazine under the title Jikū Kitan OZ (時空奇譚OZ, Jikū Kitan OZ; transl. OZ: Tales of Time and Space) from issues 1–6 in 1990. The series went on hiatus from issue 7 onward, and although there were notices of a hiatus until issue 13, it was ultimately discontinued. The illustrations were also done by Asamiya, and though some of the characters' proper nouns are different, the world view and story development are almost the same as the later Maze series.

The novel series was adapted into a manga serialized in Comic Dragon from October 31, 1996, to January 31, 2000, and an OVA series in 1996 by J.C.Staff, followed by an anime television series, a sequel movie, and a radio drama. A spin-off manga, Maze Bakunetsu Jikū: Hijiri Kinoe-ki Densetsu (Maze☆爆熱時空: 聖甲機伝説, Meizu Bakunetsu Jikū: Hijiri Kinoe-ki Densetsu; transl. Maze: The Mega-Burst Space: The Legend of the Holy Armored Machine), was serialized in Newtype 100% Comics, beginning on December 11, 1996, but remains unfinished due to the discontinuation of the magazine. It was written by Akahori and illustrated by Suganuma. A tabletalk role-playing game, Maze Bakunetsu Jikū RPG (MAZE☆爆熱時空RPG, Meizu Bakunetsu Jikū RPG; transl. Maze: The Mega-Burst Space RPG), was released on May 23, 1997, written by Akira Tano.

The OVA and anime television series were licensed in North America by Central Park Media and released on DVD under their Software Sculptors label. The TV series has aired on Comcast's Anime Selects On Demand channel multiple times.

== Plot ==
Maze wakes up in her house; everything is a wreck and she has amnesia. Before she can gather what has happened, a princess named Mill storms into her house, thanking her for having saved her life. She tells Maze that her house suddenly fell down from the sky and crushed Mill's pursuers under it. However, before long they are both on the run from further pursuers who want to get their hands on Mill.

When re-enforcements arrive, they are only saved when Maze discovers that she has phantom light magical powers and can summon Mill's family heirloom mecha, Dulger. However her performance with the mecha is weak; that is until the sun goes down and she is turned in to a lecherous man who can even handle one of the most powerful spells ever known. Soon other travellers join them as Maze tries to protect Mill and figure out what she is doing in this fantasy world; Demi-Armor hunters Aster and Solude, both of whom are interested in Female Maze; Randy, a handy guide and fairy who usually hides in Maze's shirt when the going gets tough; and Rapier, a knight and Demi-Armor pilot of the neighbouring kingdom ruled by Mill's uncle, who joins up with the party when her kingdom falls to Jaina as well.

Maze and Mill meet more companions on their journey and become embroiled in a war to defeat Jaina and raise Mill back to the throne of Bartonia.

== Characters ==
Female Maze (Mei Ikaruga)
The heroine of the story. She accidentally saves the life of Princess Mill when her house falls on Mill's would-be murderer upon falling into the fantasy world. After that she becomes extremely protective of Mill, who often shows intimate feelings or sexual advances toward Maze. She is a natural pacifist when the story begins. She has considerable magical ability but initially is much less effective at using them while a female. Maze is a fusion of Mei and her brother Akira who switch places at daybreak and nightfall. During the day Mei is dominant, while at night Akira is. Maze was brought from the real world as the Eraser to correct an imbalance.
Voiced by: Kotono Mitsuishi (Japanese); Debora Rabbai (English)
Male Maze (Akira Ikaruga)
At night, Maze turns into a male with a distinct personality from the daytime female form. He loves to fight, to the horror of the female form, who can be seen trapped in his head shouting at him wherever he tries to fight. In male form, he has vastly increased magical powers. He is very sexually predatory toward almost any pretty girl he meets. Like the female Maze, his memories are mostly wiped or jumbled upon leaving the real world, though they start to recover over time. He is initially portrayed as a sex crazed, violent monster with little personality, but in time his personality emerges. In the real world, he and his sister Mei cared for each other to the point that at the conclusion of the series, they choose to not go back to the real world, as they wish to defend it from the forces of evil. The Japanese character for "Akira" can also be read as "Mei", and thus the name "Maze" comes from the term "Meis" as in "two of Mei".
Voiced by: Tomokazu Seki (Japanese); Greg Wolfe (English)
Princess Mill Varna
Mill is the princess of one of the empires in the fantasy world (either Bestool or Bartonian). She is very outgoing and childish, and seems to have abandonment issues over Maze. She is obsessed with both Mazes and often outlines her plans to marry Maze (but always with the female one), have Maze's children (with the male one), etc. Her family was killed when the Jaina holy group took over her family's territory. She also has the power to summon Dulger, one of the greatest Demi-Armors (equivalent of a mech) in the entire world, which only Maze has the power to pilot. She says "ukyuu" in most of her sentences and refers to Maze as "Oneenii-sama" (オネニーサマ, Onenī-sama), a cross of "onee-sama" (お-姉さま, big sister) and "onii-sama" (お-兄さま, big brother). The dub changes it to "Big Sister-Brother". In the light novels, manga, and in episode 26, Mill is revealed to be a hermaphrodite.
Voiced by: Sakura Tange (Japanese); Elisa Wain (English)
Solude "Whirlwind" Schfoltzer
A Demi-Armor hunter and also a mercenary. She fights using long, black needles, and also possesses some phantom light (equivalent to magic) power, limited only to teleportation. She is also a lesbian, and often shows her attraction to Female Maze. In episode ten, she gets into a fight with a woman from her old dojo named "Lightning Rod" Medusa, and it is somewhat clear that they were old lovers until Medusa killed the master and then tried to kill Solude. During their final battle, Medusa purposely wasted her last crossbow bolt so that Solude could kill her, the reason being her lust for power had ruined the life she could have had and the life that the two of them could have had together.
Voiced by: Ai Orikasa (Japanese); Tara Sands (English)
Asterote "Aster" Reighe
Solude's partner in crime and best friend. Although they are wildly different, they both enjoy a good time, a stiff drink, a beautiful woman, and have a general hate of authority, which brings them together. Aster also has a huge crush on Maze. He fights using a grossly oversized sword and is very, very strong. Aster's full name, "Asterote", is the Japanese pronunciation of Astaroth.
Voiced by: Unsho Ishizuka (Japanese); Michael Schwartz (English)
Randy
Randy is a small fairy and the first person other than Mill to befriend Maze. She meets the pair when they run into her village. She decides to join them in order to find the magical crystals representing the 5 "Forms" of Phantom Light (including diamond, ruby, emerald, and topaz). She can often be found inside Maze's shirt, waiting for the moment where her wisdom will be needed. Randy did not originally appear in the original novels and manga, but instead appeared as an original character in the OVA, before appearing in the radio drama and anime.
Voiced by: Chinami Nishimura (Japanese); Michelle Medlin (English)
Rapier Saris
Rapier is a woman knight and a servant of Mill's uncle and aunt. For most of her life, Rapier tried to convince others (and herself) that she was not a woman. Her father wanted a son so badly that when Rapier was born, he started telling her she was a man and cut her hair very short. It was only when the king accidentally walked in on her that she was discovered to be a woman. It is hinted that Rapier showed intimate feelings for the king, going into deep remorse when the king was killed during a raid from Jaina. However, it is very likely that Rapier is attracted to Male Maze, mentioning that she would let him make a move on her after the Creator was finally defeated. It is also shown in the final episode's credits, where Male Maze is seen holding a partially undressed Rapier. Rapier is a master of the sword, able to cut down smaller Demi-Armor with relative ease.
Voiced by: Yuko Kobayashi (Japanese); Suzy Prue (English)
Ranchiki
Ranchiki is a young boy with a multi-hued hairdo who, for most of his life, has felt an unrequited love for Gold, the prince in disguise. He is an illuminator like Maze and also a Demi-Armor pilot, but he is not nearly as strong or as skilled as either Maze at these tasks. In one episode, Ranchiki pilots Dulger when Gorgeous knocks Maze unconscious, but is quickly defeated. Despite his love for Gold, he falls in love with Male Maze at first sight and will often make moves on Female Maze just because she is Maze (often saying things such as "Given the situation, I'll settle for the woman Maze.").
Voiced by: Yuka Imai (Japanese), Mirm (1st voice), and Echo (2nd voice) (English)
Dulger
The Rom Demi-Armor of the Gods. Only Mill is capable of summoning it, bio-linking it to her and Maze. It is an extremely powerful Demi-Armor that is controlled by either Maze, although Man Maze is the better pilot. Certain episodes of the anime suggest that Dulger was originally created by one of Mill's ancestors, a scientist from their world's ancient prehistory, to fight against another powerful Demi-Armor that had gone out of control, and destroyed their civilization.
Gorgeous
A narcissistic youth of Jaina who believes beauty is the ultimate power and that everything ugly must be destroyed. He is notoriously underhanded, resorting to trickery and dealbreaking to increase his own power. During one fight with Maze, he receives a scar on his face that eventually drives him to insanity. He completely fused with the evil Demi-Armor Namchi (supposedly resurrected from Hell) in order to quench his thirst for power, but was killed by Dulger and Male Maze.
Voiced by: Ryotaro Okiayu (Japanese); Rik Nagel (English)
Chic
Gorgeous's older brother. When Chic and Gorgeous were younger, there was a great strife and they both managed to narrowly escape with their lives. They would have died on their own, but Jaina took them in and cared for them. Chic vowed to give all he had to repay his debt to Jaina, even commits acts he full well knows are immoral or evil. Chic is often represented as moral yet misunderstood, and his character is often portrayed in a sympathetic light. Whereas Gorgeous' only goal was to gain power for himself, Chic is a genuinely noble person who fights for the wrong side. After Gorgeous is killed by Maze, Chic becomes angered and battles the female Maze to avenge his brother's death. Though Maze doesn't want to fight him, in the end, she ultimately kills Chic. His name is always mispronounced as "Chick" instead of the correct "Sheek".
Voiced by: Toshiyuki Morikawa (Japanese); Peter Patrikios (English)
The Creator
The leader of Jaina and the one responsible for the death of Mill's family. The Creator is a being much like Maze, except the change from man to woman happens every few minutes. Also, the Creator's male form is a hideous old man (that resembles Emperor Palpatine from Star Wars) while the female form is a beautiful dark-haired young woman. In truth, the Creator is the ancestor to Maze, and was foretold to be destroyed by Maze, who was deemed the Eraser. In the final battle, the Creator is revealed to be part of a gigantic, monstrous Demi-Armor, and absorbs Dulger with Maze inside. However, in the end, the Creator is killed by Maze once and for all.
Voiced by: Takeshi Watabe (male)/Mako Hyodo (female) (Japanese); Keith Howard (male)/Shannon Conley (female) (English)

== Episodes ==
OVA series

1. "Bold and Wonderful Challenger!!" (大胆素敵な挑戦者！！, Daitan Suteki na Chōsensha!!) (July 24, 1996)
2. "Bold and Radical Adventurer!!" (大胆過激な冒険者！！, Daitan Kageki na Bōkensha!!) (September 21, 1996)

TV series

1. "A Stranger Lost in Random Space" (April 3, 1997)
2. "The Strongest Lightning-Speed Couple, desu!" (April 10, 1997)
3. "Impossible to Escape. A Most Critical Situation, desu!" (April 17, 1997)
4. "The Ultimate Red-Hot Rage, desu!" (April 24, 1997)
5. "Traditional Strength, Blue Wolf, desu!" (May 1, 1997)
6. "Invincible Affection Rom Armor, desu!" (May 8, 1997)
7. "Beautiful, Brave Female Knight, desu!" (May 15, 1997)
8. "Dark Road of the Hell Labyrinth, desu!" (May 22, 1997)
9. "The Rise and Fall of Glory – The Tearful Ending, desu!" (May 19, 1997)
10. "Hurricane Flash – The Duel in the Midday, desu!" (June 12, 1997)
11. "Superficial Gorgeous Playboy, desu!" (June 19, 1997)
12. "The Best on Earth – Great Verdict, desu!" (June 26, 1997)
13. "Falling Headlong? Maze Wanders in Time, desu!" (July 3, 1997)
14. "Holy Arrival! Activate Rom Armor, desu!" (July 10, 1997)
15. "Expectant Project! Ukyo in the Hot Springs, desu!" (July 17, 1997)
16. "Eve of the Decisive Battle. Emotions Confuse, desu!" (July 24, 1997)
17. "Collision: Saint and Sinner. Maze Dies?! Desu!" (July 31, 1997)
18. "Sturm and Drang Super Teleportation, desu!" (August 7, 1997)
19. "High School Student. My Name is Mei..., desu!" (August 14, 1997)
20. "Pursuit Under the Moon. Beautiful Stranger, desu!" (August 21, 1997)
21. "Summer Angel! Barefoot Fairy, desunon!" (August 28, 1997)
22. "The Power Disappears! Threat Draws Near, desu!" (September 4, 1997)
23. "Capitals Under Assault! The Evil Gorgeous, desu!" (September 11, 1997)
24. "The Ultimate Battle: Good Against Evil, desu!" (September 18, 1997)
25. "Mega-Burst Space Adventure, desu!" (September 25, 1997)

=== Film ===
- Maze Bakunetsu Jikū: Tenpen Kyōi no Giant (MAZE☆爆熱時空 天変脅威の大巨人, Meizu Bakunetsu Jikū: Tenpen Kyōi no Dai Kyojin; transl. Maze: The Mega-Burst Space: Large Threat of the Giant) (April 25, 1998): After receiving news that the legendary "Ancient Giant", which once possessed enough power to destroy a country, is hidden in the Deldel Temple, Maze, Mill and the others head out to investigate. Three beautiful shrine maidens, the Del Sisters, await them at the temple, but tell them that they know nothing about the giants. Soon an enemy army attacks the temple, with Maze and company finding themselves fighting against the Giants. With the help of the shrine maidens, they finally save the fantasy world.

== Radio drama ==
The radio drama, named Maze Bakunetsu Hour (Maze☆爆熱アワー, Maze☆Bakunetsu Awā; transl. Maze: The Mega-Burst Hour), was broadcast on TBS Radio's Fantasy World (along with Dragon Hour) and Tokai Radio Broadcasting's Koichi Yamadera no Gap System from April 11, 1996, to January 20, 1997. The show was hosted by voice actors Sakura Tange and Tomokazu Seki. It was released in volumes on CD by BGM Victor.

== Music ==
Opening Theme

- "Kokū no Meikyū (虚空の迷宮, Maze of the Void)"
  Lyrics by Demon Kogure
  Composition and arrangement by Ace Shimizu, Seikima-II and Yuichi Matsuzaki
  Performed by Seikima-II

Insert song

- "Futago no Kazoeuta (双子の数え歌, Twins' Counting Song)"
  Composition and arrangement by Noriaki Yamanaka
  Performed by Aya Hisakawa

Ending Themes

- "Junk Boy" (episodes 1–13)
  Lyrics by Kaori Nishina
  Composition and arrangement by ARG and 2LUV
  Performed by KAORI 2 LUV
- "Happi Mania" (episodes 14–24)
  Lyrics by Akihito Tokunaga and Terukado Ohnishi
  Composition and arrangement by XL
  Performed by Tamao Satō
- "Jikū o Koero! Bōken-sha! (時空を超えろ!冒険者, Go Beyond Time and Space! Adventurer)" (episode 25)
  Lyrics by Shigeto Kajiwara
  Composition and arrangement by Noriaki Yamanaka
  Performed by Yoshihiro Honda
- "Big Fight!"
  Lyrics by Natsumi Watanabe
  Composition and arrangement by Noriaki Yamanaka
  Performed by Tomokazu Seki

== Reception ==
Paul Ward of Anime News Network gave the series a B−, saying, "There are lots of laughs to be had here; The animation here is very good, and consistent throughout the two episodes; the character designs are quite appealing, and a lot of bright colors are used, especially during the battle scenes. The Japanese voice actors are right on in their characters; there are a few higher-pitched voices here that might annoy some after a while, but for the most part, this is good voice acting. The English dub, by contrast, is rather flawed... the voices of Mill and Randy can get on your nerves rather quickly, and, as with most English dubs, the voices of most of the minor characters are leaden and uninspired. Most of the extras are DVD-ROM only, and the rating given is a bit deceiving based on content. Overall, this 2-episode OVA is mostly about one thing: making you laugh... the story isn't very complicated, nor does it try to be. The DVD release, while being flawed in some areas, is still a good buy, especially with the first TV episode included as a preview of things to come."

Michael Predederva of Prede's Anime Reviews said, "The look of the show is very 80's inspired, but it is the music that convinces me that the entire production team was chronologically frozen in 1984 and thawed out in 1997 to make the thing. The show is also noteworthy for having the best ending theme ever made, which samples "Off the Wall" by Michael Jackson. The anime makes nods and references to anime series and Hollywood movies. In fact, its basic plot of a bunch of rebels trying to overthrow a cruel (but cool) Emperor is basically lifted straight from Star Wars (but instead of one Darth Vader there are two, Chic and Gorgeous who are even cooler and they never yell about podracing). I admit the show has a few gimmicks going on (some characters change genders, Ranchiki was Pico before there was Boku no Pico, and there's fanservice galore), but the story is entirely epic, the characters are likable and interesting, and it's well paced. Perhaps it's not the deepest thing ever, but it's a damn good show. It mixes fantasy and mecha elements together, but it also references The Wizard of Oz and pays homage to Slayers (head writer Katsumi Hasegawa was a writer for Slayers). The dub is also worth mentioning, it's probably Matlin Recording's best effort to date, although I'm sure Elisa Wain shouting, 'Big sister-brother!' or 'Ukyuu! Here we go!' haunts the dreams of many. It's a New York City dub, with some known actors, but plenty of unknowns. But the dub is far from a late era ADV dub, so don't expect perfection or anything." Samantha Ferreira of Anime Herlad reviewed the series, saying, "Maze: The Mega-Burst Space is a series that could have been an utter disaster. It's laden with popular clichés, and isn't above shamelessly borrowing from prominent properties. The animation is average at best, and the perverted humor often tip-toes just outside of the realms of "wrong". By some miracle, though, Maze was able to become something far greater. It's a charming fantasy adventure that treads its own unique path through the countless clichés. It's offbeat, quirky, and certainly not afraid to make fun of itself when needed."

Carlos Ross of THEM Anime Reviews called the series a "silly fantasy" and a "genuine fan-service anime." Daniel Kurland of CBR stated that the series was "a broad parody works well as a two-episode experiment", but criticized the story, saying that it did not work in a 25-episode format, with "its weaknesses becom[ing] more obvious". Kara Dennison of Otaku USA said, "Between the weird story, the earworm ending theme, and how generally strange all the characters were... well, no, I can't account for my anime club on this one. But every group has that one show, right?"

== See also ==
- Orguss
