= Legend of Heavenly Sphere Shurato =

Japanese manga series

- Promotional image for Legend of Heavenly Sphere Shurato

天空戦記 シュラト (Tenkū Senki Shurato)
- Genre: Action, fantasy, mythic
- Created by: Todoroki Mihara (Note: Todoroki Mihara (美原轟) is a pseudonym for the collective contributions of the Tatsunoko animation staff.)
- Manga
- Written by: Hiroshi Kawamoto
- Published by: Shōnen Gahōsha
- Magazine: Shōnen King
- Original run: July 8, 1988 – November 11, 1988
- Volumes: 2
- Anime television series
- Directed by: Mizuho Nishikubo
- Produced by: Heita Ezu (TV Tokyo); Michio Shimizu (TV Tokyo); Masakatsu Kozuru (Sotsu Agency); Motoki Ueda (Tatsunoko)
- Written by: Takao Koyama; Mayori Sekijima
- Music by: Hiroya Watanabe
- Studio: Tatsunoko
- Original network: TXN (TV Tokyo)
- Original run: April 6, 1989 – January 18, 1990
- Episodes: 38
- Original video animation

Dark Genesis
- Directed by: Yoshihisa Matsumoto
- Produced by: Ippei Kuri
- Written by: Mayori Sekijima; Mizuho Nishikubo; Satoru Akahori
- Music by: Hiroya Watanabe
- Studio: Tatsunoko
- Released: August 16, 1991 – March 16, 1992
- Episodes: 6
- Novel series
- Written by: Satoru Akahori
- Illustrated by: Matsuri Okada; Sho Sawada
- Published by: Kadokawa Shoten
- Imprint: Kadokawa Sneaker Bunko
- Original run: December 1989 – June 1991
- Volumes: 7
- Novel series

Dark Genesis
- Written by: Mayori Sekijima
- Illustrated by: Matsuri Okada
- Published by: Enix
- Imprint: Enix Bunko
- Original run: November 1991 – March 1992
- Volumes: 2

Legend of Heavenly Sphere Shurato (Japanese: 天空戦記 シュラト, Hepburn: Tenkū Senki Shurato; lit. "Shurato of the Heaven Wars", occasionally spelled in the Siddhaṃ script on the logo and related merchandise), is a Japanese media franchise (Note: Although the manga series was the first media material of the franchise released, Shurato was planned by Tatsunoko with the intention of being a multimedia franchise.) by Todoroki Mihara. A manga series by Hiroshi Kawamoto was serialized in Shōnen Gahōsha's Shōnen King in 1988, with its nine chapters collected in two tankōbon volumes. It was followed by an anime series by Tatsunoko which ran for 38 episodes on TV Tokyo from April 6, 1989, to January 18, 1990, and also received a 6-episode OVA follow-up series named Legend of Heavenly Sphere Shurato: Dark Genesis (天空戦記 シュラト 創世への暗闘, Tenkū Senki Shurato: Sōsei e no Antō; lit. "Shurato of the Heaven Wars: The Secret Feud of Creation"), that ran from August 16, 1991, to March 16, 1992.

Set in a parallel world called "Tenkūkai", which exists alongside Earth, evil forces known as the Asura Gods threaten to overcome the forces of good, causing the magical leader of this realm to transport warriors from Earth to their world. It's loosely based on Hindu and Buddhist mythology.

== Plot ==
The plot revolves around two boys, Shurato Hidaka and Gai Kuroki, lifelong best friends who are polar opposites of each other in appearance and personality. While fighting each other in a martial arts tournament, they are suddenly encased in a beam of light and transported to a parallel world, Tenkūkai, where modern technology does not exist and instead the people rely on Sohma, a form of spiritual energy.

Shurato discovers he is actually the reincarnation of an ancient king of the same name, who once ruled this world, and one of the "Hachibushu", a group of eight legendary warriors with large quantities of Sohma, and was brought here along with Gai to fight the Asura Gods, a legion of destructive warriors. However, for unknown reasons, Gai attempts to kill Shurato repeatedly, confusing Shurato as the real Gai is a pacifist and the most compassionate person he knows.

Things quickly go wrong when Shurato and another of the Hachibushu, Ten-ō Hyūga, are framed for the petrification of Lady Vishnu, a powerful divinity and the leader of the people of Tenkūkai. The actual culprit, Vishnu's highest advisor and Asura spy Indrah, and the corrupted Gai manage to convince the remainder of the Hachibushu, as well as all of Tenkūkai's warriors and soldiers, that Shurato and Hyūga are evil and must be killed.

Although at first reluctant to get involved, Shurato eventually resolves to aid Hyūga in uncovering the conspiracy and cure Vishnu. They are accompanied by the young Tenkūkai spirit priestess Laksh, and two others of the Hachibushu, Ryū-ō Ryōma and Karura-ō Reiga. Along the way, they engage in battle with the other four of the Hachibushu, sinister Asura agents in league with Indrah, and the majority of Tenkūkai's population.

== Characters ==
Shurato Hidaka (日高秋亜人, Hidaka Shurato)
(also Shura-Oh Shurato (修羅王シュラト, Shura-ō Shurato))
The titular main protagonist of the series, Shurato, is a hot-headed, reckless, and impatient 16-year-old. He is depicted as having low tolerance and understanding of Tenkūkai's laws and inner workings, but is strong and pure-hearted. Like Gai, he is a martial arts master, and eventually becomes the most powerful of the Hachibushu and their de facto leader. His shakti and armor are both modeled after the lion, and his weapon is a vajra.
Gai Kuroki (黒木凱, Kuroki Gai)
(also Yasha-Oh Gai (夜叉王ガイ, Yasha-ō Gai))
A primary character and one of the main antagonists of the show, Gai was Shurato's best friend on Earth, but became his greatest enemy in Tenkūkai when he was put in a spell by Indrah. Unlike Shurato, he is cool, collected, and highly intelligent. He was a martial arts master, depicted as Shurato's equal, even though he was also a pacifist. His shakti and armor are both modeled after the wolf, and his weapon is a longsword.
Laksh of Hōraisan (蓬莱山のラクシュ, Hōraisan no Rakushu)
Based on the Hindu goddess Lakshmi, Laksh is a young native of Tenkūkai and a fledgling spirit priestess. She is the first person to find Shurato after he is teleported to Tenkūkai, attempting to wake him up with a kiss. She then accompanies Shurato and Hyūga on their journey, and becomes a major asset to the team when her latent Sohma powers manifest.

== Media ==
=== TV anime and OVA ===
The TV series premiered on TV Tokyo, where it ran for 38 episodes from April 6, 1989, to January 1990. It was dubbed and broadcast in Brazil, France, Spain, Venezuela, Indonesia, Philippines, South Korea, Taiwan and China. The 6-episode OVA series began release on August 16, 1991, and ended on March 16, 1992.

On April 6, 2024, in celebration of the anime's 35th anniversary, Tatsunoko announced a remaster of the series for release on streaming services like Hulu and Bandai Channel.

==== Theme songs ====
Opening theme
"Shining Soul" by Satoko Shimizu (epi. 01–25)
"Truth" by Satoko Shimizu (epi. 26–38)
"Keep Your Pure Love" by Satoko Shimizu (OVA 1–6)
Ending theme
"Sabaku no Meizu (Desert Labyrinth)" by Satoko Shimizu (epi. 01–25)
"Caravan" by Satoko Shimizu (epi. 26–38)
"Garasu no Shōnen (Glass Boy)" by Satoko Shimizu (OVA 1–6)

=== Episodes ===
| No. | Title | Original release date |
|---|---|---|
| 1 | "Om Shura Sowaka!"; Transliteration: "On.Shura.Sowaka!" (Japanese: オン・シュラ・ソワカ!) | April 6, 1989 |
| 2 | "The Great Conspiracy"; Transliteration: "Ooinaru Inbou!" (Japanese: 大いなる陰謀!) | April 13, 1989 |
| 3 | "Ryu-Oh Ryouma's Challenge"; Transliteration: "Ryu-Ou Ryouma no Chousen" (Japanese: 龍王リョウマの挑戦) | April 20, 1989 |
| 4 | "An Explosion!? Awake, Sohma!"; Transliteration: "Bakuhatsu!? Mezame Yo Sohma!" (Japanese: 爆発!?めざめよ光流!) | April 27, 1989 |
| 5 | "Feathers, Tell me the Truth!"; Transliteration: "Hane Yo! Shinjitsu wo Tsutae Yo!!" (Japanese: 羽よ!真実を伝えよ!!) | May 4, 1989 |
| 6 | "The Fight of Love and Sadness"; Transliteration: "Ai to Kanashimi no Tatakai!" (Japanese: 愛と哀しみの戦い!) | May 11, 1989 |
| 7 | "Break the Trap of Moonlight Cavern!"; Transliteration: "Gekkou Kutsu no Wana wo Yabure!" (Japanese: 月光窟のワナを破れ!) | May 18, 1989 |
| 8 | "Hurry! The Road to Tenkuuju"; Transliteration: "Isoge! Tenkuu Ju E no Michi" (Japanese: 急げ!天空樹への道) | May 25, 1989 |
| 9 | "Battle! Awaken the Holy Light!"; Transliteration: "Kessen! Seinaru Hikari wo Tomose" (Japanese: 決戦!聖なる光をともせ) | June 1, 1989 |
| 10 | "Gai's Fierce Attack! The Unending Fight to the Death"; Transliteration: "Gai Moukou! Hateshinai Shitou" (Japanese: ガイ猛攻!果てしない死闘) | June 8, 1989 |
| 11 | "Renge, Tragic Warrior of Love"; Transliteration: "Higeki no Ai Senshi Renge" (Japanese: 悲劇の愛戦士レンゲ) | June 15, 1989 |
| 12 | "Fierce Battle! A Friend Found Among Tears"; Transliteration: "Nettou! Namida no Naka ni Tomo wo Mita" (Japanese: 熱闘!涙の中に友を見た) | June 29, 1989 |
| 13 | "Sudden Change! The Beast King Mandala"; Transliteration: "Gyakuten! Juu Ou Mandala Jin" (Japanese: 逆転!獣王マンダラ陣) | July 6, 1989 |
| 14 | "At the Limits of Love and Hatred"; Transliteration: "Ai to Nikushimi no Hate Ni" (Japanese: 愛と憎しみの果てに) | July 13, 1989 |
| 15 | "The Terrible Juuga Sanninshu"; Transliteration: "Osorubeki Juuga Sanninshuu" (Japanese: 恐るべき獣牙三人衆) | July 20, 1989 |
| 16 | "A Desperate Cry! Come back, Laksh!"; Transliteration: "Zekkyou! Modore Laksh" (Japanese: 絶叫!戻れラクシュ) | July 27, 1989 |
| 17 | "A Sorceress! The Terror of the Red Flowers"; Transliteration: "Youjo! Akai Hana no Kyoufu" (Japanese: 妖女!赤い花の恐怖) | August 3, 1989 |
| 18 | "Find the Lost Time!"; Transliteration: "Ushinawareta Toki wo Motomete" (Japanese: 失われた時を求めて) | August 10, 1989 |
| 19 | "A Tearful Resolution! Goodbye, Earth!"; Transliteration: "Namida no Ketsui! Saraba Chijoukai" (Japanese: 涙の決意!さらば地上界) | August 17, 1989 |
| 20 | "Stolen Techniques"; Transliteration: "Ubawareta Hissatsuwaza" (Japanese: うばわれた必殺技) | August 24, 1989 |
| 21 | "Terror! The Combination Shakti"; Transliteration: "Kyoufu! Gattai Shakti" (Japanese: 恐怖!合体シャクティ) | August 31, 1989 |
| 22 | "Ryoma's Final Attack"; Transliteration: "Ryouma Saigo no Ichigeki!" (Japanese: リョウマ最後の一撃!) | September 14, 1989 |
| 23 | "A Storm at Tenkuuden"; Transliteration: "Arashi wo Yobu Tenkuuden" (Japanese: 嵐をよぶ天空殿) | September 21, 1989 |
| 24 | "Farewell, Raitei Indrah"; Transliteration: "Saraba Raitei Indrah" (Japanese: さらば雷帝インドラ) | September 28, 1989 |
| 25 | "A Sad Destiny! Shurato vs. Gai"; Transliteration: "Kanashiki Shukumei! Shurato Tai Gai" (Japanese: 悲しき宿命!シュラト対ガイ) | October 5, 1989 |
| 26 | "A New Enemy, the Asura Army!"; Transliteration: "Aratanaru Teki Asura Shin Gun!" (Japanese: 新たなる敵アスラ神軍!) | October 19, 1989 |
| 27 | "Find the Ultimate Shakti!"; Transliteration: "Sagase! Saikyou no Shakti" (Japanese: さがせ!最強のシャクティ) | October 26, 1989 |
| 28 | "Dark Destiny! Gai Returns"; Transliteration: "Ankoku no Shukumei! Gai Futatabi" (Japanese: 暗黒の宿命!ガイふたたび) | November 2, 1989 |
| 29 | "Reiga's Desperate Counterattack!"; Transliteration: "Reiga Kesshi no Hangeki!" (Japanese: レイガ決死の反撃!) | November 9, 1989 |
| 30 | "The Loneliness of the Chosen One"; Transliteration: "Erabareshimono no Kodoku" (Japanese: 選ばれし者の孤独) | November 16, 1989 |
| 31 | "Burn! Sohma of Friendship"; Transliteration: "Moyase! Yuujou no Sohma" (Japanese: 燃やせ!友情の光流) | November 23, 1989 |
| 32 | "The Brahma Shakti is Discovered!"; Transliteration: "Shutsugen! Brahma no Shakti" (Japanese: 出現!ブラフマーのシャクティ) | November 30, 1989 |
| 33 | "Good or Evil!? The Creation God Brahma's Choice"; Transliteration: "Sei Ka Ja Ka!? Souzou Shin Brahma no Sentaku" (Japanese: 正か邪か!?創造神ブラフマーの選択) | December 14, 1989 |
| 34 | "The Final Battle! The Fist of Hatred"; Transliteration: "Saishuu Kessen! Nikushimi no Kobushi wo Hike" (Japanese: 最終決戦!憎しみの拳を引け) | December 21, 1989 |
| 35 | "The Future! Through the Deep Darkness"; Transliteration: "Mirai! Fukai Yami wo Koete" (Japanese: 未来!深い闇を越えて) | December 28, 1989 |
| 36 | "An Urgent Message! The Last Battle!"; Transliteration: "Kinkyuu Juugou, Saigo no Tatakai" (Japanese: 緊急集合 最後の戦い) | January 4, 1990 |
| 37 | "Smash the Charm-Water, the Shadow that Attacks Tenkuukai!"; Transliteration: "Tenkuukai wo Osou Kage" (Japanese: 天空界をおそう影 迷い水を撃て) | January 11, 1990 |
| 38 | "Be Forever, Shura-Oh!"; Transliteration: "Eien Nare Shura-Ou" (Japanese: 永遠なれ修羅王) | January 18, 1990 |

=== OVA Episodes ===
| OVA | Overall | Title | Original release date |
|---|---|---|---|
| 1 | 39 | "Mirage Beginning"; Transliteration: "Maboroshi Yume Shōjō" (Japanese: 幻夢蕭条) | September 16, 1991 |
| 2 | 40 | "Water of Amnesia"; Transliteration: "Futokoro Sousei Mizu" (Japanese: 懐想逝水) | October 16, 1991 |
| 3 | 41 | "Gathering of Saints"; Transliteration: "Seija Harukagū" (Japanese: 聖者遙遇) | November 21, 1991 |
| 4 | 42 | "Demon Ascension"; Transliteration: "Tenma Shundō" (Japanese: 天魔蠢動) | December 21, 1991 |
| 5 | 43 | "Demon's Binding"; Transliteration: "Mikoto Oni Tsuduri Kinu" (Japanese: 尊鬼綴絹) | January 21, 1992 |
| 6 | 44 | "Eternal Recurrence"; Transliteration: "Eigō Kaiki" (Japanese: 永劫回帰) | March 16, 1992 |

=== Manga and novels ===
The manga series was done by Hiroshi Kawamoto based on drafts by Studio Ammonite; it was serialized in Shōnen Gahōsha's Shōnen King from July 8, 1988 to November 11, 1988, and then collected into 2 tankōbon volumes in 1989 and 1990. The manga was released in Italy in 2024 by Sprea Comics. Black Box released the series in France. Shurato also spurred two novel series written by Satoru Akahori and Mayori Sekijima, and drama CDs.

==== Manga volumes ====
| No. | Japanese release date | Japanese ISBN |
|---|---|---|
| 1 | December 1989 | 4-78-594636-9 |
Chapters 1 to 4
| 2 | July 1990 | 4-78-594644-X |
Chapters 5 to 9

==== Novels ====
Akahori series

| No. | Title | Release date | ISBN |
|---|---|---|---|
| 1 | Shuya Tensei (修夜転生) | December 1989 | 4-90-052721-1 |
| 2 | Maha Airo (魔破隘路) | March 1990 | 4-90-052730-0 |
| 3 | Senki Kaiko (戦鬼邂逅) | May 1990 | 4-90-052732-7 |
| 4 | Fubatsu Taiga (不抜大我) | August 1990 | 4-90-052743-2 |
| 5 | Kugai Hoko (苦界彷徨) | December 1990 | 4-90-052754-8 |
| 6 | Setsuma Aishi (刹魔哀史) | March 1991 | 4-90-052758-0 |
| 7 | Neppu Doto (熱風怒涛) | June 1991 | 4-90-052760-2 |

Sekijima series (Dark Genesis)

| No. | Title | Release date | ISBN |
|---|---|---|---|
| 1 | Sōsei e no Antō (Jō) (創世への暗闘〈上〉) | November 1991 | 4-90-052781-5 |
| 2 | Sōsei e no Antō (Ge) (創世への暗闘〈下〉) | March 1992 | 4-90-052793-9 |

=== Home Media Release ===
The second OVA series was released on three VHS tapes by Bandai Media Division in 6 volumes:

| No. | Release date |
|---|---|
| 1 | December 15, 1989 |
| 2 | December 15, 1989 |
| 3 | February 23, 1990 |
| 4 | February 23, 1990 |
| 5 | April 24, 1990 |
| 6 | April 24, 1990 |

The original series was released on two DVD box sets in Japan, titled "MEMORY BOX", the first on February 25, 2003, and the second on May 23, 2003.

On November 22, 2024, the official X (Formerly Twitter) account announced that the MEMORY BOX box sets would be released on Blu-ray, officially releasing it on February 26, 2025.

=== Soundtrack ===
The first soundtrack, titled Tenku Senki Shurato Tensei Dazzle Original Soundtrack (天空戦記シュラト 転生眩奏 オリジナルサウンドトラック) was released by King Records on June 21, 1989, as a normal version, and then on March 5, 1993, as Normal Board. The second soundtrack, titled Tenku Senki Shurato Tenzan Ming Raku Soundtrack (天空戦記シュラト 天山瞑楽 サウンドトラック) was released King Records on September 5, 1989, and March 5, 1993.

== Mechanical designers ==
- Studio Ammonite (Hiroshi Ogawa, Hiroshi Okura, and Takashi Ono)
