= Satoru Akahori =

Japanese scriptwriter, novelist and manga author

Satoru Akahori あかほり さとる
- Born: March 8, 1965 (age 61); Handa, Aichi Prefecture, Japan
- Known for: Manga

Satoru Akahori (あかほり さとる, Akahori Satoru; born 赤堀 悟) is a Japanese scriptwriter, novelist and manga author. He is known for NG Knight Ramune & 40 and the Sorcerer Hunters series. His other works include Saber Marionette and Sakura Wars, which come in anime, novel and manga forms.

== Works ==
- Akahori Gedou Hour Rabuge: Series Composition, Script (episodes 1–2, 7, 12–13), Original creator
- Combustible Campus Guardress (with Kazushi Hagiwara): Series Composition, Screenplay, Original creator
- Jankenman: Series Composition
- Kami to Sengoku Seitokai (manga with Ryosuke Takada)
- Kashimashi: Girl Meets Girl (with Yukimaru Katsura)
- Lime-iro Senkitan: Scenario, Script (episodes 1, 3, 5–6, 8, 11, 13), Original creator
- Magical Shopping Arcade Abenobashi: Series Composition, Script (episodes 2–3, 5, 11), Novel Serialization (Kadokawa Shoten The Sneaker)
- Master of Mosquiton (manga version with Hiroshi Negishi)
- Maze: Bakunetsu Jikuu (manga version with Rei Omishi)
- Mon Colle Knights: Script, Original creator
- Mouse (with Hiroshi Itaba)
- NG Knight Ramune & 40
- Saber Marionette J
- Sakura Wars (manga version with Oji Hiroi)
- Sorcerer Hunters (manga version with Rei Omishi)
- Sorcerer on the Rocks
- Tekkaman Blade: Series Composition, Screenplay (episodes 2, 15–16, 28, 48)
- Video Girl Ai: Script (episodes 1, 5), Series construction
- Cyber Team in Akihabara
- Kyatto Ninden Teyandee/Samurai Pizza Cats
- Martian Successor Nadesico
- Legend of Heavenly Sphere Shurato
