= Knights of Ramune =

Japanese original video animation

- DVD cover of Knights of Ramune

VS騎士ラムネ&40FRESH (Bāsasu Naito Ramune to Fōtī Furesshu)
- Genre: Science fiction
- Created by: Ashi Productions Planning Office
- Original video animation
- Directed by: Yoshitaka Fujimoto
- Written by: Katsumi Hasegawa
- Music by: Hiroshi Imaizumi
- Studio: Ashi Productions
- Licensed by: NA: Discotek Media
- Released: 1997
- Runtime: 30 minutes (each)
- Episodes: 6

Knights of Ramune, known in Japan as VS Knight Ramune & 40 Fresh (VS騎士ラムネ&40FRESH, Bāsasu Naito Ramune to Fōtī Furesshu), is a Japanese original video animation series that follows the adventures of Cacao and Parfait, holy virgins, in their search and rescue mission of the 4th Warrior Ramunes, given to them by the apparent head of their religious order, Master Follower. They are joined in these adventures by Lemon, a twelve-year-old girl, and PQ, a hand-sized blob with a face that is an expert on spiritual topics. The OAV is known as VS Knight Ramune & 40 Fresh in Japan, and is a sequel to VS Knight Ramune & 40 Fire, an anime television series; it was released in the U.S. by Software Sculptors and Central Park Media.

== Characters ==
- Cacao – A full-fledged holy virgin, she has strong magical powers. The dark-skinned girl explains that this magic works best when the body is unconstricted, and is thus naked at various points throughout the show.
- Parfait – Unlike Cacao, Parfait is still in training as holy virgin. Beyond the third episode of the OAV, she pilots an experimental mecha naked, as the cockpit is filled with water as a shock absorber.
- PQ (alternately spelled Piqu) – A hand-sized spiritual advisor, PQ often says things that embarrass Parfait, and endures various forms of physical abuse throughout the show, such as being thrown, stretched, and stepped on.
- Lemon – A twelve-year-old girl, Lemon joins Parfait and Cacao after they rescue her and a large group of children. Her name is an obvious pun, as "Lemon" is a slang term for explicit anime and manga.
- Ramunes III – Flashbacks show the adventures of Ramunes III with Cacao and Parfait.
- Ramunes IV – Upon being sent by magic to the Giga Genos, a large spaceship, Parfait and Cacao find Ramunes IV, who is cruelly sadistic. He also attempted to rape Cacao. It is later revealed that this character is not the real Ramunes IV, but an impostor who was put in place until Don Vodka's search for the real Ramunes concluded.
- Electone – An android copy of Drum, a character from the original television series who is mounted to the wall of Ramunes IV's private quarters. She is torn between her duty to Ramunes and her jealousy of Cacao.
- Don Vodka – A part-android who has been integrated into the Giga Ginos, he saw his home world destroyed by the power of the Dark Knight, a giant mecha, when it was activated by someone other than the Warrior Ramunes. He has thus striven to find the real Ramunes to control the Dark Knight.

== Storyline ==
Parfait, Cacao, and PQ are sent by their religious order to find the Fourth Warrior Ramunes. They arrive on the Giga Genos, and are immediately surprised to find it in battle with the defensive forces of a planet, which are subsequently destroyed. The Giga Genos then orbitally bombards the major cities of the planet below. Parfait and Cacao find a large group of children who are being held captive. The two holy virgins defeat the guards, release the children using escape pods, and sabotage the ship.

Some more guards find them, and they are pursued until they run into Ramunes IV. He explains that the entire galaxy must be united under his rule to prevent an upcoming disaster. Shocked by his cruel nature, especially in comparison to the Ramunes III they knew, they continue running and fall into an experimental mech during a fight, where they find Lemon and are then thrown into space and fall to the planet below, protected by Cacao's holy magic.

Reminded of her duty to serve Ramunes, Cacao meets him at a lake on the planet surface. Ramunes tells her that he is aware of her feeling of amorousness toward the third warrior, and, by extension, himself. Enraged, Electone later attacks Cacao, while Parfait attempts to rescue her from Ramunes, but fails when Electone, acting on Ramunes' orders, retrieves Cacao from the water.

Ramune's followers begin excavation of the Dark Knight, allowing PQ, Lemon, and Parfait to sneak aboard the Giga Ginos and make another rescue attempt. While escaping, they find the injured Don Vodka, who explains that the man claiming to be Ramunes is a pretender, chosen as a young boy to act as a leader for the people until the real Ramunes was found, and that he now intends to activate the Dark Knight, which will cause the planet to be destroyed. Electone, shocked that Ramunes has left without her for the Dark Knight, enters, kills Don Vodka for suggesting that Ramunes is an impostor, and begins fighting the Holy Virgins; she is defeated. The Giga Genos falls to the planet below, and Parfait, Cacao, PQ, and Lemon exit in the experimental mech.

Electone emerges from the wreckage and enters the Dark Knight. The fake Ramunes activated it, causing the mech to reject him. Electone finds him and reminisces about how she has helped raise him and lived by his side as his assistant and lover; he notes with surprise that he has lived his whole life as the Warrior Ramunes and wonders how this could not be the truth as he dies from the Dark Knight's attack. Electone reactivates the Dark Knight, causing it to spew out energy over the planet's surface, but is killed when Cacao and Parfait attack and enter it with the help of Ramune's former followers, who have recognized that they have been misled.

Parfait and Cacao enter the Dark Knight's control room, but are unable to stop the destruction that it is unleashing. Lemon enters, and the Dark Knight acknowledges her as the true Warrior Ramunes. She orders the giant mech to stand down, thus saving the world.

After the credits of the sixth episode, we are treated to a trailer of "Knights of Lemon", which supposedly would show Lemon's further adventures, but no such product has been yet released.
