= List of Kiddy Girl-and characters =

This is a list of characters from Kiddy Girl-and, a 2009 sequel to the science fiction anime series Kiddy Grade.

== Characters ==
=== Main characters ===
Ascoeur (アスクール, Asukūru)

Voiced by: Aya Uchida
The protagonist of the series, born August 10, SC0363 (Star Century 0363). Ascoeur and Q-feuille are ES member candidates who work as waitresses for the Touch & Go! cafe within the GTO headquarters. Ascoeur's special ability, "Push-Pull," allows her to teleport herself and others. It is later revealed that her real name is Lieselotte and that Geacht'er is her biological brother. She was once a member of the Nouvlesse and was imprisoned with her brother in an experimental facility when the universe was to become a democracy. When their powers first manifested right before she was about to be crushed, she ended up in a cryogenic chamber and was separated from her brother, losing all of her memories up until that point.

Q-feuille (ク・フィーユ, Ku-Fīyu)

Voiced by: Aya Gōda
Her official date of birth is September 21, SC0372. She has qualities reminiscent of Lumière: her intelligence and serious nature, in addition to a heightened sensitivity to embarrassment. She also is an anime otaku, particularly of a Cardcaptor Sakura parody show, Card Getter Sakura. Like Ascoeur, she is an ES member candidate, but currently works as a waitress for the Touch & Go! cafe. Her special ability, "Parfum," gives her precognition, but is seldom used as it seems to be weak, leading her to rely on Chocolate Bombs: bombs that resemble chocolate treats. In addition, Q-feuille inherited Troisienne's ability to stop time. Though she should be sixteen-years-old, she reveals to Di-air that she is seven-years-old, like Di-air. It is later revealed that Q-feuille's full name is Quatre Feuille IV Lumière and that she was created seven years ago by Eclipse, the former director of the GOTT, who died in the process. After overusing her Time Ability, Q-feuille lost all of her memories and ended up with the G Society.

Di-air (ディア, Dia)

Voiced by: Yumeha Takahashi
Di-air is a seven-year-old girl recruited as an ES member candidate, apprenticing under Ascoeur and Q-feuille. Her past is shrouded in a mystery even she does not know, but is implied it was a life of perpetual darkness. Although her hair seems adorned by red hair clips similar to that of Chi from Chobits which she can twitch them at will like ears. Her special ability allows her to increase the magnitude of other people's abilities, through a lips-to-lips kiss. She later displays the ability to both use Time and Space manipulation.

T.A.M.A (タマ, Tama; Trial-type of Assemble-system & Multipurpose Automata)

Voiced by: Norio Wakamoto
A pocket-sized, lime-green creature whom befriends Di-air and terrorizes Ascoeur and Q-feuille when the trio are assigned to investigate the ruins of the GOTT headquarters. When empowered by Di-air, T.A.M.A. was able to gather remnants of nanotechnology to transform into a Genetech Beast.

=== Supporting characters ===
==== GTO Higher Ups ====
Hiver (イヴェール, Ivēru)

Voiced by: Kaori Mizuhashi
The current Bureau Chief of the GTO. Hiver is the reincarnation of Pfeilspitze (Mercredi). She has shown the ability to travel through a dimensional door, which explains how she always seems to appear out of nowhere.

Sommer (ゾマ, Zoma)

Voiced by: Itsuki Takizawa
Chief Hiver's secretary. He appears to be very close to Hiver and is rarely (if ever) away from her side. Sommer is the reincarnation of Armbrust.

==== ES Members ====
Trixie (トリクシー, Torikushī)

Voiced by: Yuki Matsuoka
Trixie was a skilled, energetic ES member, whom both Ascoeur and Q-feuille greatly admired. It was revealed that she could teleport like Ascoeur, however she was able to carry people and objects, something Ascoeur cannot currently achieve unless "powered up" by Di-air. Trixie was also able to deflect attacks by bending space around her. Her unexpected death had a great impact upon Ascoeur and Q-feuille. It is later revealed that Eclipse attempted to clone Éclair and Lumière using Trixie's abilities and that Trixie was part of the third generation of Éclair, with her predecessors being Uniear and Duerry.

Troisienne (トロワジェイン, Torowajein)

Voiced by: Yukana
Troisienne was the quieter, more composed of the two but equally admired by both Ascoeur and Q-feuille, although arguably closer to the latter due to her otaku tendencies (which after revealing they are clones of each other suggests that it is hereditary). Her ability allowed her to literally stop time, but she was only able to do this a few times before becoming fatigued as it produced a great strain on her body. Like Trixie, her death had a great impact upon Ascoeur and Q-feuille. It is later revealed that Troisienne was a clone of Lumière created by Eclipse and part of the third generation of Lumière, with her predecessors being Uni-ace and Dionie.

Éclair (エクレール, Ekurēru)

Voiced by: Ryōko Nagata
Éclair is seen in the prologue of the first episode, saving a planet from destruction. It is revealed she did so by freezing it and the surrounding space in time. It is later revealed in episode 18 that Eclipse had attempted to clone Éclair with her quantum abilities, she made three generations of clones (including Trixie) but died before making a fourth. She finally makes an appearance in episode 22, when the Space Time was removed by Geacht'er. After the universe was saved, they returned to the GTO as what appears to be receptionists. Despite Ascoeur not being her clone, they are similar in many ways from ability to personal quirks.

Lumière (リュミエール, Ryumiēru)

Voiced by: Aya Hirano
Lumière is the partner of Éclair. Eclipse had attempted to clone Lumière and made three generations of clones, the third being Troisienne and the fourth later revealed to be Q-feuille. She finally makes an appearance in episode 22, when the Space Time was removed by Geacht'er. After the universe was saved, they returned to the GTO as what appears to be receptionists.

Tweedledee (トゥイードゥルディ, Tuīdurudi)

Voiced by: Natsuko Kuwatani
Tweedledee is an ES member from the previous series, though appears to not have aged. It is revealed that in training, Ascoeur was assigned to her and her partner, Tweedledum. She is very competitive and has a strong sense of pride, as is shown when Ascoeur and Q-feuille infiltrated a booby-trapped GTO headquarters at night, and Tweedledee took it as a chance to test out the new intruder system. Tweedledee has the ability to control electricity and can create an effect similar to Lumière's "Puppet". She is able to communicate and even exchange bodies with her brother over great distances using an advanced form of telepathy.

Tweedledum (トゥイードゥルダム, Tuīdurudamu)

Voiced by: Jun Fukuyama
Tweedledum is an ES member from the previous series, and twin brother of Tweedledee. He is the calmer of the two, though has a sister complex and a malicious streak. He seems to dislike Ascoeur, most likely due to jealousy over his sister's attention from when Ascoeur was assigned to them for training. Tweedledum has the ability to control the magnetic fields around him, combining with Tweedledee to create a powerful gravitational force.

Un-ou (アンオウ, Anou)

Voiced by: Akira Ishida
Un-ou is an ES member from the previous series. He and A-ou are first seen in the prologue of the first episode, however only mentioned briefly before appearing in episode 7. Un-ou is the energetic, malicious of the two, balancing out his partner's quiet personality. It is revealed that in training, Q-feuille was assigned to Un-ou and A-ou. Un-ou's "Amazing" ability allows him to listen to the various life energies which allow them to track down their enemies. Though he is a guy, he has a penchant for dressing in women's clothing. He is also called a tsundere by others.

A-ou (エイオウ, Eiou)

Voiced by: Tetsu Inada
A-ou is an ES member from the previous series, and partner of Un-ou. The older and more stoic member of the duo, A-ou (unlike his partner) has a stronger sense of honor and justice. He is also more of a pacifist and he often speaks in a profound and meaningful manner, giving him a rather preachy presence among other people. His ability, "Amplifier" gives him the ability to improve his visual perception tenfold, as well as to see the light of people's lives and how that dims when they die. He also uses the energy seen by Un-ou to increase the power of his physical attacks.

==== Others ====
Mi Nourose (ミ・ヌゥルーズ, Mi Nurūzu)

Voiced by: Minoru Shiraishi
Mi Nourose is the chief of "Touch & Go!", the café Ascoeur, Q-feuille and Di-air work in, as well as the head of the dormitory. Mi Nourose has a penchant for cosplay, and is always seen in a different outfit. At the end of episode 24, Mi Nourose is revealed to be someone of importance as he's seen on top of a ship and has knowledge of the space-frozen time.

Alisa (アリサ, Arisa)

Voiced by: Mai Aizawa
One of the GTO receptionists, and frequent customer of "Touch & Go!". Alisa has quite a lively spirit and is a keen follower of dramas and yaoi.

Belle (ベル, Beru)

Voiced by: Chika Horikawa
One of the GTO receptionists, and frequent customer of "Touch & Go!". Belle often speaks common sense when things get out of hand.

Chevalier D'Autriche (シュバリエ・ドートリッシュ, Shubarie Dōtorisshu)

Voiced by: Norio Wakamoto

Chevalier D'Autriche is the adopted son of Éclair. He appears in episode 12 but his name was shortened to Che (シュウ, Shū). He revisits the planet every year where his mother is trapped in Frozen Space Time, leaving a wreath for her. At the end of the series, Chevalier is reunited with Éclair.

=== Antagonists ===
==== G Society ====
G Society is a terrorist organization that claims to be a nation. However, they are composed of descendants of the corrupt Nouvelesse (people who are descendants from Mother Earth) whom GTO (then GOTT) removed from power thanks to Éclair and Lumière. These people want revenge and are led by the mysterious Geacht'er, the self-proclaimed only pure-blood Nouvelesse. They also show no care for their own members, regarding the dead body of a man who voice disbelief towards Geacht'er as trash. Despite this they have considerable power over the universe's government, which lead to the temporary suspension of the GTO. Their Shadow Workers are ability-users who enforce their standards, mostly commoners with the exception of Letuchaia and Pauki, though none of the teams trust the other.

Geacht'er (ガクトエル, Gakutoeru)

Voiced by: Satoshi Hino

Geacht'er is the leader and founder of G Society whose goal is to dismantle the GTO. He projects a message to Aineias claiming that the GTO are corrupt and that his G Society will bring peace to the galaxy. His ability is to plant deadly roses onto targets. These roses are white before turning red while the victim is dying. After the death, the rose then turns black. He has also inherited the ability to manipulate time. Many of the G Society believe he is not who he claims to be, but are too scared to voice their thoughts aloud. It is later revealed that Geacht'er is Ascoeur's brother and that his real name is Alfred. Despite his polite and kind personality, he is able to kill anyone in his way without a second thought.

Team 1
Composed of Saphir and Rubis who worked with the Royal Guard as assassins during when the Nobility ruled. However, after the GOTT made the universe a democracy they were imprisoned for 50 years before being sentenced to death. It was then where Geacht'er saved them.

Saphir (サフィル, Safiru)

Voiced by: Kaoru Mizuhara

Saphir is a Shadow Worker of G-society, first appearing in episode 4 along with her partner, Rubis. Her ability allows her to create ice at will for attack and defense. Though she is the calmer of the two of her team, she can become very angry if someone insults Geacht'er. Saphir becomes one of the chief antagonists later on, as her loyalty to Geacht'er is so strong that she would even attack her partner Rubis to serve him when she now believes her to be a traitor. Her personality is later no longer the calm cold it once was, as now the plan is near completion she has shown another side, a sadistic love of war and death, seeming to be the only one from the very start of the three teams to know that the removal of Time Space will destroy the universe, and finds joy that all the "stupid people" will die and the chosen few will survive. She appears to have died when she fell into the energy filled planet.

Rubis (リュビス, Ryubis)

Voiced by: Fūko Saitō

Rubis is a Shadow worker of G-society, first appearing in episode 4 with her partner Saphir, despite the fact she doesn't like cold temperatures. Her ability allows her to transform into a powerful feral form with extendable claws. She also is immune to poison. After seeing the lengths Geacht'er would go without any remorse, she appears to have change sides and repeatedly helps Q-feuille's and Di-Air out. She is last seen in a hospital with a cast.

Team 2
Consisting of Torch and Shade, both who possess powers revolving around illusions. They used to be GTO ES Members before betraying them to join the G Society, however this was revealed to because of their corrupt director, who ordered to have them killed to cover up his corruption. They also have a habit of using their powers to become invisible and spy on girls. They are currently acting as Q-feuille's bodyguards while she is brainwashed into believing she is Geacht'er's little sister.

Torch (トーチ, Tōchi)

Voiced by: Kazuya Nakai

Torch is a Shadow Worker of G-society, first appearing in episode 7 when he attacks Q-feuille, Trixie and Di-air. He uses "Illusions", attacking the three from a distance but making it appear as though he was right in front of them. Torch is very loyal to his partner Shade and has complete trust in him. It was later revealed that Torch and Shade were former ES members themselves before defecting to G Society. He is well known to be a womanizer, stating he likes to have a woman's company in bed. In episode 19 it is revealed that both Torch and Shade were in the police force and when they wanted to kill off Shade, Torch stayed with him and did not abandon him. In episode 19, even after Geacht'er brainwashed Torch asked him to kill Shade, Shade would rather kill himself as he does not like the idea of having partners fight each other. He is later attacked by Geacht'er when he disobeyed his order by the use of one of his roses, but is later revealed to have survived.

Shade (シェイド, Sheido)

Voiced by: Nobuo Tobita

Shade is the partner of Torch, his abilities being similar, the only difference is that his illusions are implanted in the minds of his targets, giving the victim's eyes a purple and green color when under the effects. He is also able to read minds as well as brainwash people. He attacks Ascoeur and Troisienne, and seems to sees something special in Ascoeur. He apparently has somewhat of a rivalry with Saphir as shown in episode 11, most likely with their devotion towards Geacht'er, where they scowl at each other passing in the hall and Saphir causes to freeze part of the hall. In episode 19 it is revealed that both Torch and Shade were in the police force; when Shade learned something that could endanger both of them, he refused to tell Torch to prevent him from getting involved. When Torch asked Shade would comply to Lord Geacht'er's request to kill Torch, Shade does not answer him; the Geacht'er does give the order, Shade refused. He later goes after Torch when he is falling out of the space station, though used his powers on Geacht'er before doing so. He is later seen with Torch living a normal life.

Team 3
Consisting of Letuchaia and Pauki, two young children. They are the only Nouvelesse Shadow Workers. They are cousins working as Shadow Workers as their service allows their grandmother to get high quality medical treatment.

Letuchaia (リトゥーシャ, Ritūsha)

Voiced by: Hiromi Konno

Letuchaia is known as the "princess" of G Society and has a habit of using multiplication to express her feelings. She acts posh and snobbish and shows respect to only Geacht'er. She has a grudge against the GTO and its actions because her Nouvelesse grandparents were thrown out onto the streets. However, she has becomes extremely jealous over the fact that Q-feuille has taken her "little sister" position to Geacht'er, leading her to try to get rid of her. Her ability, Crazy Cracker, is to eject energy bolas from her fingers. She is Pauki's cousin. However, her loyalty to Geacht'er has seemed to have vanished after discovering the removal of Time Space was not going to be used for peace, and in fact used to destroy the universe, along with making sure Ascoeur followed his orders by threatening the lives of everyone on G Society, including her grandmother.

Pauki (パウーク, Paūku)

Voiced by: Megumi Matsumoto

Pauki is Letuchaia's cousin and possesses similar abilities to her. He is very loyal to Letuchaia to an obsessive degree. He also has a habit of answering Letuchaia's rhetorical questions, which causes her to scold him. Pauki later sides with the GTO along with his cousin, and seems to have gained a crush on Tweedledee.

===== Others =====
Genetech Beasts (ジェネテックビースト, jenetekkubīsuto)
Shape-shifting nanomachines originally developed by the labs at the GOTT, now used as weapons by terrorists. Traces of the technology litter the abandoned GOTT headquarters.

Core (コア, Koa)
Voiced by: Mami Kosuge
A secretive maid who first appears in episode 8, she is given special glasses from Letuchaia to spy on the other G Society ES Members and give the information to Geacht'er.

Grandma
Letuchaia's Nouvelesse grandmother, she is sick with a currently unnamed illness and is currently residing at a hospital which she was able to get thanks to her grandchildren becoming Shadow Workers.
