= Megumi Kadonosono =

Japanese animator

Megumi Kadonosono (門之園 恵美, Kadonosono Megumi; born April 28, 1970) is a Japanese animator, animation director and character designer from Osaka, Japan.

== Anime credits ==
- Aquarian Age: Sign for Evolution: Animation (OP/ED)
- Clannad movie: Character Design
- D.N.Angel: Animation director (ep 20)
- Generator Gawl: Animation director (ep 3)
- Genesis Survivor Gaiarth: Key Animation (Ep 3; MU FILM, Ltd.)
- Kiddy Grade: Character Design, Animation director (OP), Eyecatch Illustration (ep 1)
- Kiddy Grade movies: Character Design
- Kiddy Girl-and: Character Design
- Kishin Taisen Gigantic Formula: Original Character Design
- Legend of Himiko: Animation Character Design
- Level C: Animation
- Magic Knight Rayearth 2: Animation director (eps 36, 45)
- Martian Successor Nadesico: Animation director (characters)
- Metal Fighter Miku: Principal Drawing
- Oshare Majo Love and Berry: Shiawase no Mahou: Chief Animation Director, Character Designer.
- Petopeto-san: Key Animation (OP)
- Pretear: Animation director (ep 11)
- Rayearth (OVA): Character Design
- Shuffle!: Key Animation (ED)
- Uta-Kata: Character Design
- Vampire Knight: Key Animation (OP)
- Vampire Princess Miyu: Animation director (ep 26, OP, ED), Assistant Animation Director (ep 20), Character Planning
- Zettai Karen Children: Key Animation (ED)
