= List of Kiddy Girl-and episodes =

Kiddy Girl-and is a 2009 sequel to the Japanese science fiction anime series Kiddy Grade.

In October 2006, news of a Kiddy Grade sequel was announced, under the working title of Kiddy Grade 2 (キディ・グレイ) (K-G.2), to be animated by Asread (Shuffle! anime). On February 26, 2009, it was re-announced under the new title Kiddy Girl-and (キディ・ガーランド, Kidi Gārando) along with news of a new manga adaptation, Kiddy Girl-and Pure (キディ・ガーランド ぴゅあ, Kidi Gārando Pyua). The sequel is set 50 years after the original series and introduces two new female protagonists, Ascœur (アスクール, Asukūru) and Q-feuille (ク・フィーユ, Ku Fīyu).

== Episode list ==
No.	Title	Original release date
1	"Lucky Item"; Transliteration: "Rakkī Aitemu" (Japanese: ラッキーアイテム)	October 15, 2009
25 years after Éclair and Lumière used their powers to stop the explosion of a planet, cadet partners Ascoeur and Q-feuille are working in the cafe of the Galactic Trade Organization's main office on the planet Aineias. Ascoeur is a bit over-eager, naive, and clumsy while Q-feuille is the level-headed, yet hypersensitive one. On this particular day, Ascoeur gets into an argument with her manager over her wearing bloomers, and Ascoeur inadvertently takes them off right in front of GTO Chief Hiver. She goes on to realize that she accidentally took off her underwear as well, but before she can do anything about it, assassins who are after Chief Hiver show up. Ascoeur jumps into action and manages to defeat the assassins, but they then combine their armor into a mechanical dragon. Ascoeur's attack on the dragon's head causes it to go berserk, and she's forced to ride it throughout the GTO building, causing tons of damage in the process. She's eventually able to cut it in half, and the guards finish it off and go on to arrest the assassins. In the aftermath, Ascoeur and Q-feuille are scolded by Chief Hiver inside her ruined office, but ES members Trixie and Troisienne see promise in them.
2	"Sweet, Trap"; Transliteration: "Amai, Wana" (Japanese: 甘い、罠)	October 22, 2009
After having gotten herself incredibly worked up over some pudding, Ascoeur finally gets her chance to eat it. Unfortunately, Q-feuille sneezes and causes a chain reaction that leads to the pudding spilling all over the floor. Determined to get some pudding, Ascoeur decides to raid the cafe kitchen, but to get there during the after-hours, she and Q-feuille have to overcome the security system upgrades that Tweedledee made. Q-feuille's expertise and memory helps them get through most of the traps, but they are eventually faced with an army of Tweedledee dolls that soon overwhelm them. Q-feuille sacrifices herself so that Ascoeur can go ahead, but Ascoeur ends up tripping and falling into another trap. By the time the girls finally reach the kitchen, it's already daytime, and the puddings have all been consumed.
3	"The Worst Compatibility?"; Transliteration: "Saiaku no Aishō?" (Japanese: 最悪の相性？)	October 29, 2009
Ascoeur has recently developed a bit of a crush on Troisienne and wishes Q-feuille could be more like her. This fixation pisses Q-feuille off, and it develops into a full-blown fight after Ascoeur subsequently disrespects a collector's item from an anime called "Card Getter Sakura" that Q-feuille loves. Their arguing keeps Alisa and Belle up all night, and as a result, their boss makes Ascoeur and Q-feuille fill in for their friends as front-desk receptionists the next day. Ascoeur and Q-feuille's problems are set aside though when they encounter an injured man who needs to settle a draft in the next 10 minutes. Using their abilities, Ascoeur and Q-feuille are able to work together to find the right person to deliver this to, and they make it just in time. In the aftermath, the two girls reconcile, and Ascoeur is glad that Q-feuille is her partner. They learn later that it was actually Troisienne's anime collector's item that they found earlier, and, much to Ascoeur's dismay, Q-feuille and Troisienne really hit it off.
4	"Babysitting Special Duty"; Transliteration: "Komori Tokumu" (Japanese: 子守特務)	November 5, 2009
One day, much to their surprise, Ascoeur and Q-feuille find themselves assigned an actual mission: to babysit a special little girl named Di-air. Things go smoothly at first as the two get to know Di-air and become her friend, and they show her around GTO headquarters and take her outside to play. The problems begin when, while outside, the three are approached by the hostile duo Rubis and Saphir who are from the same group as the assassins from before. It turns out though that Rubis and Saphir are not after Di-air and had instead come to face Ascoeur and Q-feuille, and the two struggle against Rubis' feral form and Saphir's ice powers. Ascoeur in particular can't make good use of her limited teleportation powers against Rubis, but the tides of battle turn after she gets a kiss from Di-air, and she's suddenly able to use much more advanced techniques. Rubis and Saphir are eventually forced to retreat because GTO security finally shows up, and Ascoeur and Q-feuille report back to Chief Hiver. Despite the attack, Chief Hiver decides to continue to leave Di-air with them, and Q-feuille in particular wants to take care of the little girl.
5	"Ghosts of the GOTT"; Transliteration: "GOTT no Bōrei" (Japanese: GOTTの亡霊)	November 12, 2009
With Di-air now part of their team, Ascoeur and Q-feuille are given a mission to investigate the old GOTT building. Once inside of the place, Q-feuille is scared, and things only get worse for her when both Di-air and Ascoeur run off, leaving her by herself. The unfamiliar place, darkness, and weird noises really get to her, and she runs across what appears to be a shape-shifting monster. She's able to escape from it and eventually finds Ascoeur, however there's still no sign of Di-air. The two then make their way to a laboratory-like area, and they come across what appear to be the ghosts of Alv and Dvergr. The ghosts disappear though, and Di-air suddenly reappears, unconcerned and without a scratch on her. The girls don't get much time to rest however because they are attacked by a mechanical-looking monster that Di-air identifies as a Genetech Beast. It can change forms, and Ascoeur and Q-feuille have trouble against it until Di-air kisses them both and powers them both up. They're then able to defeat it and find out afterward that its real form is that of a small creature, and Di-air was playing with it all along. Di-air even decides to adopt it and brings it back with her to GTO.
6	"Suspicion of the Bureau Chief's Office"; Transliteration: "Kyokuchōshitsu no Giwaku" (Japanese: 局長室の疑惑)	November 19, 2009
When Ascoeur, Q-feuille, and Di-air make a cafe delivery to Chief Hiver's office one day, they find her acting strange. What's more, Sommer is much closer to her than usual. Suspicious, the girls spy on the pair using Ascoeur's teleport ability, and they find Hiver and Sommer having intense relations. When the two realize that the girls are there, they claim that they're practicing some magic for the Christmas party, so the girls back off even though Q-feuille isn't entirely satisfied with that answer. Sometime later, in an unrelated incident, Alisa takes the girls to a male voice actor cafe and reenact a yaoi version of a scene from The Melancholy of Haruhi Suzumiya. Akira Ishida, Jun Fukuyama, Nobuo Tobita, Tetsu Inada and Minoru Shiraishi play the cafe's voice actors. While there, Di-air kisses her pet Tama and transforms him into a bishōnen. When the guys who work there get jealous, they try to poison him, but that causes him to go berserk and destroy the place before reverting to his normal form.
7	"The 2 we admire" Transliteration: "Akogare no Futari" (Japanese: 憧れの2人)	November 26, 2009
Trixie and Troisienne bring along Ascoeur, Q-feuille, and Di-air on a mission to uncover some warships being illegally manufactured for the G Society that's been attacking GTO. They successfully assault the station where the warships are being made with Trixie and Troisienne's own ship, and afterward, the girls board the station and split up into two groups to look for evidence against the G Society. Trixie, Q-feuille, and Di-air eventually run into a pair of the G Society's own special ability users, Torch and Shade, though Shade soon departs to take care of Ascoeur and Troisienne. Torch's attacks keep Trixie's group on the defensive while Shade tries to keep Ascoeur and Troisienne from escaping the station before it explodes. Thanks to Ascoeur and Q-feuille's abilities though, all the girls are able to make it out alive, and Torch and Shade get away with only one of the warships.
8	"G-Society"; Transliteration: "G Sosaeti" (Japanese: Gソサエティ)	December 3, 2009
While the GTO is preparing for its 25th anniversary event, elsewhere, the G-society is having a ceremony of its own. Led by the mysterious Gacktoel and his Shadow Workers – Torch, Shade, Rubis, Saphir, Letuchie, and Pauk – the G-society is made up of Nouvlesse who were thrown out of power thanks to the GOTT. On this day, they declare independence and set their sights on the GTO, particularly on Chief Hiver and the three elite ES member teams.
9	"Memorial Ceremony"; Transliteration: "Kinen Shikiten" (Japanese: 記念式典)	December 10, 2009
The GTO anniversary event is interrupted almost as soon as it begins by the sudden appearance of a giant image of Gacktoel. Torch and Shade are already there, and they use their powers to turn the GTO soldiers against the crowd. Gacktoel then deploys his own soldiers, so Chief Hiver has no choice but to send out the top ES members. While Un-ou, A-ou, Tweedledee, and Tweedledum face off against the enemy forces, Trixie and Troisienne cover up the giant image with smoke. Ascoeur and Q-feuille try to help as well, but after Un-ou and Tweedledum get hurt, it's Trixie and Troisienne who come back to save the day. They appear to drive off all the Shadow Workers, but Gacktoel himself then uses the opportunity to strike down both Trixie and Troisienne. Realizing that they were dying, the two ask Ascoeur and Q-feuille to protect the future of the galaxy before they lose consciousness.
10	"The 2 who lived" Transliteration: "Ikite Ita, Futari" (Japanese: 生きていた、2人)	December 17, 2009
Ascoeur and Q-feuille have been depressed ever since the attack, and because G-Society's ploy worked, the GTO is currently limited in how it can act. However, unlike Ascoeur and Q-feuille who feel now that they can't do anything, Di-air remains upbeat and vows to become an ES Member. What's more, Di-air has been noticing something in the distance and finally goes to investigate one day. It turns out to be G-Society spies, but because Di-air is alone, she can't do much, and Tama can barely protect her. Fortunately, Ascoeur and Q-feuille come to her rescue, and their opponents respond by releasing several Genetech Beasts. These prove too much to handle until Di-air's life comes in direct danger, at which point Ascoeur and Q-feuille suddenly find themselves able to use Trixie and Troisienne's old powers. They are thus able to defeat the beasts and force their opponents to withdraw. Afterward, Ascoeur realizes that their bodies must remember how Trixie and Troisienne fought and that the two live on inside of them. She and Q-feuille regain their resolve to become ES Members, and sometime later, they are made into warrant ES Members by Chief Hiver.
11	"Shadow Worker"; Transliteration: "Shadou Wākā" (Japanese: シャドウワーカー)	December 24, 2009
While Ascoeur, Q-feuille, and Di-air are getting briefed on the G-Society's various Shadow Workers, over in the G-Society, Letuchaia and Pauki are visiting their hospitalized grandmother who is getting special treatment thanks to their status. Letuchaia reveals to their grandmother that she's been collecting information on their fellow Shadow Workers by sending in a maid as a spy. This maid learned that Rubis eats a lot, tries to live life without waste and regret, and finds Letuchaia and Pauki bothersome. Saphir, on the other hand, keeps a messy room and returns home with hickeys on her chest. The maid also learned that Torch is a bit of a womanizer in his free time, but he and Shade are close and used to be on the galactic police force together until they switched sides to the G-Society. It turns out that Letuchaia gathered all this information because Geacht'er asked her to, but what she doesn't know is that Geacht'er also had Saphir and Shade spying on their fellow Shadow Workers. Back at the GTO, Sommer informs everyone that the G-Society is trying to replace the GTO, and they've got some powerful allies. The GTO thus needs Ascoeur, Q-feuille, and Di-air to fight for them, but first the girls need to know about the time freeze incident from 25 years ago.
12	"The Space Frozen in Time"; Transliteration: "Jikan no Kōritsuita Kūkan" (Japanese: 時間の凍りついた空間)	December 31, 2009
As Hiver and the others explain to Ascoeur and Q-feuille, there was a planet which was made up of a powerful energy ore, and Geacht'er tried to ignite it 25 years ago. In order to prevent the destruction of the galaxy, the ES members of GOTT had tried to protect the planet, and although they were ultimately unsuccessful at that, Éclair and Lumière had managed to use their powers to freeze the explosion. This had the side effect of trapping both of them as well, and Trixie and Troisienne were supposed to be the key to stopping the explosion. Hiver now wants Ascoeur, Q-feuille, and Di-air to go with A-ou to that frozen space and confirm the situation there. For this, they are given the ship Mistral, but before they take set off, Ascoeur suddenly starts feeling dizzy. A-ou also senses something, but none of them see Geacht'er hiding in the shadows. The group eventually arrives at the location and stops at an unmanned station there, and A-ou reveals that, although everyone who approaches the spot gets frozen, there is an opportunity approximately every three years. That time is coming up soon, but Trixie and Troisienne are now dead. A-ou then heads out to get a closer look on his own, and while he's gone, another ship arrives carrying a man who sends out a wreath in memory of the mother he lost. The man calls himself Che, and that the mother was none other than Éclair. He wonders if he can see her again in his lifetime, so the girls reassure him that he will and that they'll protect everyone.
13	"Vacation²"; Transliteration: "Bakansu Bakansu" (Japanese: バカンス²)	January 7, 2010
As warrant ES-members, Ascoeur, Q-feuille, and Di-air are given a mission to a resort planet that only allows females. The current group of guests is trapped on the planet, and rescue attempts have failed due to the planet's security system. The girls thus head there masquerading as vacationers, and they bring along their guard robot Typhon wearing a bikini. On the planet, they run into Alisa and Belle, and they learn that the security system employs an army of robots. Those robots are controlled by a computer which is located underground, so Ascoeur, Q-feuille, and Di-air wait until nighttime and attempt to sneak in. When they are discovered, they ride Typhon underground and find a female member of the failed rescue attempt who's been trying her best to stop the malfunctioned system from the inside. Together, they try to destroy the system, but Ascoeur and Di-air go a little overboard, and the robots don't stop. Because some of the vacationers need saving, Ascoeur and company head back out and destroy their mechanical opponents using a combination of Typhon and the Mistral. They also save Alisa and Belle using their own abilities, thus revealing that they're now ES-members. In the aftermath, things are returned to normal, and the girls are allowed to leave.
14	"Moment of Encounter"; Transliteration: "Deai no Toki" (Japanese: 出逢いの刻)	January 14, 2010
Q-feuille recently has been experiencing lapses in her memory, so she goes to the data archives and looks up her past. Hiver finds her there, and it turns out that Eclipse gave birth to Q-feuille seven years ago but gave up her life in the process. Q-feuille didn't have a partner until she met Ascoeur, and Q-feuille recalls how they first met when she was on a mission to investigate oppression on a planet. Ascoeur was a girl on the street and already had the ability to teleport, so Q-feuille handcuffed them together, and the two bonded as they escaped from the military police there. Thanks to the abilities of Tweedledee and Tweedledum, as well as Ascoeur's ability to teleport small objects, they were able to stop the leader of the military police from blowing up the city. Afterward, the two girls became partners since their abilities had good compatibility. Back in the present, Q-feuille remembers everything, and Ascoeur and Di-air come to get her to show her that Tweedledum and Un-ou have recovered.
15	"A Bad Dream"; Transliteration: "Warui Yume" (Japanese: 悪い夢)	January 21, 2010
Ascoeur recently has been experiencing some vivid dreams involving her friends and colleagues, including one where she and Q-feuille are in their school's drama club. What she doesn't realize is that Shade is responsible for them and has been probing her mind while she sleeps. Based on this, Shade is able to report to Geacht'er that Ascoeur has lost her memories of the past after some accident in space. Geacht'er then heads down to the planet and tries to talk to Ascoeur, but she sees him as the enemy and attacks immediately. None of her attacks have any effect on him though, and he reveals that he has the same birthmark on his neck that she has on her leg. What's more, he calls Ascoeur his little sister Lieselotte and explains that she had escaped from a research laboratory where they had been kept. Geacht'er now wants her to join him, but Ascoeur, after remembering how he killed Trixie and Troisienne, refuses and tries to run away. Geacht'er, however, has the power to mess with time and easily catches her, and he names himself Ascoeur's true partner. Fortunately for her, Q-feuille and Di-air show up, and Ascoeur calls upon a huge amount of power to try to bring Geacht'er down. Geacht'er is able to avoid her attack, but he decides to give Ascoeur some time to say goodbye to her friends, and he departs for now.
16	"Cold Tears"; Transliteration: "Tsumetai Namida" (Japanese: 冷たい涙)	January 28, 2010
After the Geacht'er incident, Ascoeur hasn't told Q-feuille the truth, but Q-feuille has also been hiding her memory problems from Ascoeur. For the time being, the two are informed that Saphir has apparently defected from the G-Society and has taken refuge on an ice planet. The girls decide to go out to get her, and when they arrive, they find Rubis there too. After a brief battle, Saphir manages to make Rubis retreat, and she's soon able to gain the girls' trust. Saphir's plan is to wait until nighttime so that Rubis can't pursue them, but this is a trap in reality, and she makes it so cold that the girls want to sleep. This was all part of Geacht'er's plan to capture Ascoeur, however Q-feuille now complicates things by being re-energized from a Di-air kiss and freezing Saphir. Di-air also kisses Ascoeur, but Ascoeur isn't able to do anything after getting poisoned by Rubis. Q-feuille ends up freezing Rubis too, but this is too much strain on her, so she has TAMA carry Di-air and Ascoeur back to the ship to escape without her. In the aftermath, Ascoeur wakes up back at the GTO, and Q-feuille wakes up at the G Society.
17	"Unknown Name"; Transliteration: "Shiranai Namae" (Japanese: 知らない名前)	February 4, 2010
Knowing that Q-feuille has been captured thanks to a recording made by Typhon, Ascoeur is determined to go rescue her. Q-feuille is actually being treated quite well right now by her captors (unaware they want nothing to do with her), and part of that is because she has no memories of who she is. She spends the most time with Rubis and Saphir who reveal to her that they used to be assassins for the government. That changed when the Nouvlesse period ended, and their new masters tried to torture them into obedience. They were luckily rescued from this by Geacht'er. Q-feuille also meets the other Shadow Workers and learns what her own name is, and while she still has no memories of who she is, the name Ascoeur stays in her head. She goes as far as to write Ascoeur's name down on her mirror, however Shade pays her a visit the next day and implants memories in her to make her think that she's Geacht'er's little sister. This changes her and makes her forget the name Ascoeur.
18	"Sister Princess"; Transliteration: "Shisutā Purinsesu" (Japanese: シスター・プリンセス)	February 11, 2010
With GTO set to be dismantled, its ES-members are being sent elsewhere, leaving just Ascoeur, Di-air, Hiver, and Sommer. Ascoeur really wants to go save Q-feuille, but Hiver and Sommer stop her and make her reveal everything that happened with Geacht'er. Q-feuille meanwhile remains brainwashed and her acting lovey-dovey with Geacht'er really pisses off Letuchaia. Letuchaia thus tries to get back at her, but her attempts fail and Letuchaia instead finds herself becoming Q-feuille's friend. Back at GTO, Hiver has Ascoeur learn more about Q-feuille from the database, and Ascoeur finds out that Q-feuille was part of an ES-member duplication plan that was in response to the time freeze incident. Trixie and Troisienne were the third generation and Q-feuille was the fourth, but Q-feuille didn't get a partner because Eclipse died. Hiver explains that Q-feuille had been lonely for a long time, so she was happy to have Ascoeur and had thus wanted to save her. She also thinks that as long as the two girls have their deep bond, they can call out to each other and will meet again someday. This occurs sooner than anticipated because Q-feuille, Shade, and Torch suddenly arrive at the GTO headquarters and come face to face with Ascoeur.
19	"Partner"; Transliteration: "Pātonā" (Japanese: パートナー)	February 18, 2010
Ascoeur thinks at first that the Q-feuille in front of her might be an illusion, but she soon realizes that that's incorrect. It only gets Q-feuille angry, and she forces Ascoeur to fight her. Ascoeur tries to reason and talk instead, but an annoyed Q-feuille just freezes Ascoeur. However, after seeing Ascoeur's subsequent suffering, Q-feuille herself starts crying and doesn't understand why. When Q-feuille blames Ascoeur and takes it out on her, Di-air's powers activate, turning her a golden color, and she saves Ascoeur. Nothing Q-feuille does is effective against Di-air, and it turns out that Di-air is able to control both space and time. Realizing the gravity of the situation, Torch and Shade save Q-feuille and retreat back to the G-Society headquarters. Upon learning about what happened, Geacht'er orders the capture of Ascoeur and the elimination of Di-air. Afterward, Torch confides to Shade that he doesn't like the idea of partners fighting each other. It reminds them of the police corruption that at first had pitted them against each other and had then set them both up to be killed. What had saved them had been Geacht'er, but this memory had triggered doubts in Shade about if he could kill Torch if ever ordered to. Back at the GTO, Di-air is given some rest, and Hiver explains to Ascoeur that Di-air used up all her power at once, powers which she inherited from Eclipse. When Di-air does finally wake up, Ascoeur suggests that they go get Q-feuille together.
20	"The Real Me"; Transliteration: "Hontō no Watashi" (Japanese: ほんとうの私)	February 25, 2010
Q-feuille joins Letuchaia and Pauki on a trip to the hospital to visit their grandmother, but things quickly turn sour when various people mention how Q-feuille replaced Letuchaia as Geacht'er's little sister princess. This confuses Q-feuille because her altered memories tell her that it's only ever been her, and in frustration, Letuchaia tells Q-feuille the truth about her GTO ES-member origins. This leads to Q-feuille remembering Ascoeur and Di-air, but her hair ornament causes her to lose consciousness. Shade and Torch then take her back to her room, and Shade makes her forget all about this incident. Meanwhile, over at GTO headquarters, Ascoeur and Di-air decide to move out to go get Q-feuille back, and this time Hiver lets them because she's also ready to act on the frozen time space. After saying goodbye to their friends, Ascoeur and Di-air take the Mistral to G-Society's Erde Meteor and sneak on board while their ship keeps the defense forces occupied. On the way in, Ascoeur gets the feeling that she's been there before and experiences several flashbacks, including one of her brother. The girls soon get attacked by Q-feuille who's there with Geacht'er. He calls Ascoeur by the Lieselotte name, but she declares that she's Q-feuille's partner Ascoeur.
21	"Memories Return"; Transliteration: "Yomigaeru Kioku" (Japanese: 蘇る記憶)	March 4, 2010
As Ascoeur tries to convince Q-feuille that she's being deceived, the Erde-Meteor suddenly initiates warp and starts moving towards the frozen time space. Geacht'er then tries to have Q-feuille capture Ascoeur, and the other Shadow Workers surround the girls. Once Q-feuille freezes Ascoeur, Geacht'er leans in to kiss her, but Di-air stops it with her power, and Ascoeur uses the opportunity to teleport both her, Di-air and Q-feuille away. Di-air's power further grants Ascoeur the chance to try to talk some sense into Q-feuille, but Q-feuille isn't happy since she now knows that Ascoeur is Geacht'er's real sister. Before anything major can happen, Geacht'er finds them again and wants to kiss Ascoeur to make her remember her past. Ascoeur tries to escape again, but the other Shadow Workers tie her up to stop her. Seeing Ascoeur in so much pain and calling out to her causes Q-feuille to start crying again, and Ascoeur eventually loses consciousness. This allows Geacht'er to kiss her, and that in turn restores in Ascoeur the memories of how her parents sent her away to be a test subject so that she could survive and how she had found her brother there. The experiments he had been subject to had affected his sanity, but she had promised to be with him forever and had kissed him. That caused a reaction that blew up part of the research station they were on, and the two got separated when it appeared that Ascoeur got buried under some debris. In truth, she had teleported to safety and had escaped in a pod, but she lost her memories in the process. Geacht'er had also escaped and had vowed despair and pain on the universe for all that happened to him. Back in the present, Ascoeur has regained her memories, but Q-feuille then instinctively attacks Geacht'er, so he orders her to be dealt with. Saphir has no qualms about doing this, but Ascoeur saves her partner and kisses her. Even Geacht'er's power can't stop this, and Q-feuille returns to normal.
22	"Time Begins to Flow"; Transliteration: "Nagare Hajimeru Jikan" (Japanese: 流れ始める時間)	March 11, 2010
As a space battle begins between the G-Society and the GTO forces, over inside the Erde Meteor, Geacht'er takes possession of Ascoeur and freezes Q-feuille. Geacht'er then heads off with Ascoeur and the other Shadow Workers to enact his plan, but Rubis stays behind under the pretense that she'd take care of Di-air. Instead, she destroys the area's surveillance system so that Di-air and the unfrozen Q-feuille can escape. Ascoeur later awakens in a chair that connects her to the Erde Meteor's warp gates. Geacht'er's plan is to use his and her power to unfreeze the frozen time space and destroy everyone in the galaxy except for the G-Society. If Ascoeur tries to escape, it'll cause a chain reaction that will destroy the Erde Meteor and all of the people on it, including Letuchaia's grandmother. Letuchaia's pleas convince Ascoeur not to do anything drastic, and Geacht'er sets his plan in motion. While he's out in space though, Q-feuille and Di-air arrive to save Ascoeur. Q-feuille is able to overcome Saphir and Letuchaia's abilities with her own powers, but Ascoeur doesn't want to be set free because she doesn't want everyone on the Erde Meteor to die. Fortunately, Tweedledee, Tweedledum, Un-ou, and A-ou suddenly show up to help, and they injure Saphir and force her to retreat. Tweedledee and Tweedledum then stop the system connected to Ascoeur by using one of her hairs, but it turns out that they're too late, and time outside starts moving again.
23	"Feelings Don't Stop"; Transliteration: "Tomaranai Omoi" (Japanese: とまらない想い)	March 18, 2010
In order to stop Geacht'er, Ascoeur, Q-feuille, and Di-air head towards the northern pole in the Mistral. They break through the G-Society fleet thanks to some help from the GTO fleet, and the Mistral then battles Saphir and Torch & Shade's ships while the three girls teleport onto Geacht'er's ship. Because of all that happened to him in the past, all Geacht'er cares about now is destroying the galaxy. He tries to kill Q-feuille, but Hiver and Sommer arrive to save her. They then try to seal Geacht'er off in subspace, but he stops everything with his power. Geacht'er realizes too late that Q-feuille is still moving towards Ascoeur even while time is stopped, and the power of the three girls causes time to resume. They are able to freeze Geacht'er long enough for Sommer to enclose him, and this gives Ascoeur and Q-feuille a chance to stop the explosion. Q-feuille thus heads with Di-air back to the Erde Meteor while Ascoeur stays at the northern pole, and when the two girls activate their powers in unison, they enter a space where they meet Éclair and Lumière. Together, the four girls are able to stop the explosion and return the planet to normal. Unfortunately, soon after, the captured Geacht'er disappears, and his ship is revealed to be an illusion. At the same time, the Erde Meteor's warp gate activates, and Tweedledee isn't able to do anything about it unless she has direct access to the main computer. Letuchaia and Pauki thus take Tweedledee and Tweedledum there while Rubis stays behind with Q-feuille and Di-air. It's too late to stop the warp however, and the Erde Meteor takes the planet along with everything else into warp. While this is going on, Geacht'er appears in the same room as Q-feuille. Saphir is there as well and tries to kill Di-air, but Rubis protects the girls at the cost of her own body. Geacht'er captures Q-feuille anyway, and he calls for Ascoeur to come. His plan is to detonate the planet again by crashing it into another one, the GTO home planet of Aineias. Before this plan can come to fruition though, Ascoeur rams the Mistral into the Erde Meteor control room and jumps out to save Q-feuille.
24	"Together Forever"; Transliteration: "Itsumademo Issho" (Japanese: いつまでも一緒)	March 25, 2010
Ascoeur finds herself surrounded by enemies, but luckily for her, when Shade tries to use his powers on her, Torch stops him. Ascoeur then questions if they're okay with everyone dying as a result of Geacht'er's plan, and Torch reveals that he isn't. He confronts Geacht'er about the meaning behind all this, so Geacht'er explains that it's the universe that's meaningless, and he orders Shade to kill Torch. When Shade refuses, Geacht'er uses his power to plant a deadly rose on Torch, and Torch falls out of the hole that the Mistral created when it crashed into the Erde Meteor. Shade jumps down into the abyss after him, but he first provides Ascoeur with some help by using his power to blind Geacht'er. Rubis also saves Q-feuille from falling through the hole, but the bigger problem is that the Erde Meteor has started to break down. Tweedledee sends Letuchaia and Pauki to help the civilians escape, and the two successfully lead everyone to an evacuation ship, but they aren't able to launch because the ship is still tied down to the Erde Meteor. Q-feuille and company want to go help, but Geacht'er has Saphir stop them, leading to her facing off against Rubis again. Fortunately for Rubis, Q-feuille saves her from Saphir's ice spikes and then freezes Saphir. Although the others then go to help Letuchaia and the civilians, Ascoeur opts to stay behind with Geacht'er because she remembers her promise from long ago to stay with him. Even without Ascoeur, Rubis is able to free the evacuation ship, allowing it to launch as the rest of the Erde Meteor disintegrates. Ascoeur and Geacht'er meanwhile are flung into space, and Ascoeur grabs her brother. It is now that he finally reveals that he didn't care about everything else and just wanted to be with her. Her presence makes him happy, and he admits that he loves her. As he begins to disappear, Geacht'er tells Ascoeur that all of her belongs to him and all of him belongs to her, and Ascoeur gives him one last kiss. In doing so, all of Geacht'er's power transfers to her, and Ascoeur decides to try to stop the Galactic Genocider on her own. Seeing this from the evacuation ship, Di-air kisses Q-feuille and sends her to where Ascoeur is, and Q-feuille arrives just in time. The two girls reunite with a kiss and then combine their powers to move and disarm the Galactic Genocider. In the aftermath, the two are picked up, still holding hands, by Mi Nourose, and life returns to normal.
