= Keiji Gotoh =

Japanese anime director and character designer

- Born: November 4, 1968 (age 58)
- Occupations: Anime director Character designer
- Website: goto.cute.or.jp

Keiji Gotoh (後藤圭二, Gotō Keiji; born November 4, 1968) is a Japanese anime director, character designer, manga artist, and member of three man production team gímik whose works include Kiddy Grade and Uta Kata.

== Works ==
=== Television ===
- Thundercats (1985), In-between animation
- Kiko Senki Dragonar (1987), In-between animation
- Transformers: The Headmasters (1987), In-between animation
- Tsuideni Tonchinkan (1987), In-between animation
- Moeru! Oniisan (1988), In-between animation
- Shin Pro Golfer Saru (1988), In-between animation
- What's Michael? (1988), In-between animation
- Ronin Warriors (1988), In-between animation
- Mister Ajikko (1987), Key animation, key animation (eps 76, 80, 85, 94, 96, 98-99)
- Mahōtsukai Sally (1989), Key animation (eps 3, 22)
- Jungle Book Shōnen Mowgli (1989), Key animation (ep 7)
- Yawara! A Fashionable Judo Girl (1989), Key animation (eps 17, 26)
- Brave Exkaiser (1990), Key animation (eps 19, 25, 29, 34, 39, 43)
- Nadia: The Secret of Blue Water (1989), Key animation (eps 17, 19, 25)
- Getter Robo Go (1991), Key animation (eps 3, 8, 17, 24)
- The Brave Fighter of Sun Fighbird (1991), Key animation (eps 12, 17, 21, 28, 32, 38)
- Dragon Quest: Dai no Daibōken (1991), Key animation (eps 5, 12, 30, 37, 43)
- The Brave Fighter of Legend Da-Garn (1992), Key animation (eps 1, 7, 12, 17, 22, 31, 36)
- Tekkaman Blade (1992), Key animation (eps 7, 15, 26, 33, 48)
- Mahō no Princess Minky Momo: Yume o Dakishimete (1991), Key animation (ep 29)
- The Brave Express Might Gaine (1993), Ending animation (eps 27+), key animation (eps 1, 27, 37)
- Yadamon (1992), Animation director (eps 97, 150), key animation (eps 97, 150)
- Miracle Girls (1993), Key animation (eps 37, 41, 44, 50)
- Mobile Suit Victory Gundam (1993), Key animation (ep 40)
- Brave Police J-Decker (1994), Key animation (eps 1, 11, 17, 23, 29, 35)
- Magic Knight Rayearth (1994), Animation director (eps 2, 7, 12, 16)
- Magic Knight Rayearth 2 (1995), Animation director (eps 21, 26, 31, 36), animation (OP #2), key animation (eps 26, 31, 36, 41, 45, 48-49)
- Blue Seed (1994), Animation director (eps 8, 13, 17), key animation (eps 7, 26)
- Macross 7 (1994), Animation director (eps 26, 31, 38), key animation (eps 16, 39)
- Sorcerer Hunters (1995), Character design, animation director (eps 1, 11, 19, 25-26), key animation (opening, episodes 1, 11, 15, 17, 26)
- Neon Genesis Evangelion (1995), Key animation, key animation (ep 9)
- Saint Tail (1995), Key animation (OP2, eps 29, 42)
- Akachan to Boku (1996), Key animation (ep 4)
- Martian Successor Nadesico (1996), Character design, animation director (episodes 1, 19, 26), mechanical animation director (episode 6), character animation director (episode 13) key animation (episodes 1, 6, 9, 21, 23, 26), opening animation
- Those Who Hunt Elves (1996), Character design, animation director (OP, ED, ep 12), key animation (ep 12)
- Revolutionary Girl Utena (1997), Key animation (ep 1), key animation (ep 9)
- Hyper Police (1997), Character design, animation director (eps 15, 25), key animation (eps 15, 25)
- Slayers Try (1997), Key animation (ep 6)
- Chōja Reideen (1996), Key animation (ep 38)
- Those Who Hunt Elves 2 (1997), Character design
- Vampire Princess Miyu (1997), Key animation (OP, ED, ep 25)
- Kodocha (1996), Key animation (ep 90A)
- Cooking Master Boy (1997), Key animation (ep 27)
- Berserk (1997), Key animation (ep 23)
- Cyber Team in Akihabara (1998), Animation director (ep 26), key animation (ep 26)
- Generator Gawl (1998), Storyboard (ep 3), key animation (eps 3, 12)
- Steam Detectives (1998), Key animation (ep 5)
- Legend of Himiko (1999), Design work, ending animation (ep 4 onwards), opening animation
- Betterman (1999), Key animation (ep 25)
- Gate Keepers (2000), Storyboard (ep 20), episode director (ep 20), character design, chief animation director, animation director (OP, ED, eps 12, 20), animation (eps 12, 24), key animation (OP), layout supervisor (ep 24)
- Pilot Candidate (2000), key animation (OP; ep 1)
- Fruits Basket (2001), Storyboard (eps 5, 22), episode director (eps 5, 22), key animation (ep 26)
- Samurai Girl: Real Bout High School (2001), Director (OP), character design, animation director (OP), key animation (OP)
- Kiddy Grade (2002), Director, storyboard (eps 1, 2, 4, 15, 24), storyboard (OP; ED), episode director (eps 1, 24; OP; ED), eyecatch illustration (ep 24), key animation (eps 1, 9, 10, 20, 24)
- D.N.Angel (2003), Director (ep 20), storyboard (ep 20)
- Samurai Champloo (2004), Key animation (ep 26)
- Uta Kata (2004), Director, ending illustration (ep 12), original artwork
- Shuffle! (2005), Storyboard (ep 7), episode director (ep 7), animation director (ep 7)
- Petopeto-san (2005), Key animation (OP)
- Aria the Animation (2005), Episode director (ep 3), key animation (ep 3)
- Blood+ (2005), Key animation (ep 1, 13)
- Fate/stay night (2005), Key animation
- Ergo Proxy (2006), Key animation (ep 16)
- Aria the Natural (2006), Storyboard (ep 9)
- School Rumble: 2nd Semester (2006), Ending key animation
- Jyu-Oh-Sei (2006), Storyboard (ep 8), key animation (OP)
- D.Gray-man (2006), Storyboard (ep 76)
- Ghost Slayers Ayashi (2006), Opening Animation
- Kishin Taisen Gigantic Formula (2007), Director, storyboard (ep 1, 2, ED), storyboard (ep 26), episode director (ep 1, 2, ED), episode director (ep 26), key animation (eps 1, 18, 26)
- Kaiji: Ultimate Survivor (2007), Storyboard (ep 24)
- You're Under Arrest: Full Throttle (2007), Storyboard (ep 18)
- Macross Frontier (2007), Key animation (eps 19, 25)
- Kure-nai (2008), Animation director (ep 7), key animation (eps 1-2)
- Itazura na Kiss (2008), Animation director (ED2)
- Amatsuki (2008), Storyboard (ep 12)
- Vampire Knight (2008), Storyboard (ep 12)
- Slayers Revolution (2008), Eyecatch illustration (5b, 12b)
- Strike Witches (2008), Key animation (OP)
- Hidamari Sketch × 365 (2008), Key animation (ep 12)
- Natsume Yūjin-Chō (2008), Storyboard (ep 8)
- Yozakura Quartet (2008), Key animation (OP)
- Toaru Majutsu no Index (2008), Key animation (ep 8)
- Ga-Rei -Zero- (2008), Storyboard (ep 4), episode director (ep 4), animation director (ep 4), key animation (ep 12)
- Michiko to Hatchin (2008), Key animation (ep 1)
- Kiddy Girl-and (2009), Director, storyboard (ED 1–2; eps 1–2, 9), episode director (ED 1–2; ep1), key animation (Pilot DVD; ED 1, ep 1)
- Endride (2016), Director, storyboards, episode director
- In/Spectre (2020), Director
- In/Spectre 2nd Season (2023), Director

=== Original video animations ===
- Dangaioh (1987), In-between animation
- Relic Armor Legaciam (1987), In-between animation
- Xanadu: The Legend of Dragon Slayer (1987), In-between animation
- Chōjin Densetsu Urotsukidōji: Birth of the Overfiend (1987), In-between animation
- Dominion (1988), In-between animation (OP), key animation (ep 4)
- Armor Hunter Mellowlink (1988), In-between animation
- Chōjin Densetsu Urotsukidōji: Final Inferno (1989), In-between animation, key animation
- The Guyver: Bio-Booster Armor (1989), Key animation (OP)
- Megazone 23 Part III (1989), Key animation (ep 2)
- Ogami Matsugoro (1989), Key animation
- Angel Cop (1989), Key animation (ep 3)
- Nineteen 19 (1990), Key animation
- Angel (1990), Assistant animation director, Key animation
- Iczer Reborn (1990), Key animation (eps 1, 4)
- Sol Bianca (1990), Key animation (ep 2)
- Shin Chōjin Densetsu Urotsukidōji: Mataiden (1991), key animation
- Genesis Survivor Gaiarth (1992), Key animation (ep 1)
- Giant Robo (1992), Key animation, key animation (eps 1–4, 6)
- Ai no Kusabi (1992), Key animation
- Chōjin Densetsu Urotsukidōji: Mirai Hen (1993), character design (eps 2-3), key animation (eps 2-3)
- Bastard!! (1992), Key animation (ep 4)
- Moldiver (1993), Key animation, key animation (ep 6)
- Dirty Pair Flash: Mission I (1994), Ending animation, opening animation
- GinRei (1994), Key animation (ep 1)
- Tekkaman Blade II 1st stage (1994), Key animation (ep 1)
- Elementalors (1995), Key animation
- Graduation (1995), Key animation (ep 2)
- New Cutey Honey 1st stage (1994), Key animation (eps 2, 4)
- Tekkaman Blade II 2nd stage (1995), Key animation (ep 5)
- Idol Defense Force Hummingbird '95 Song of the Wind (1993), Animation assistance (ep 3)
- New Cutey Honey 2nd stage (1994), Key animation (ep 5)
- Idol Project (1995), Key animation (OP)
- Ninja Cadets (1996), Key animation
- Golden Boy (1995), Key animation (ep 6)
- Voltage Fighter Gowcaizer (1996), Key animation (Vol. 1)
- Apocalypse Zero (1996), Key animation (ep 2)
- Sorcerer Hunters (1996), Character design, animation director (OP), design, key animation (OP), layout Check (ep 1)
- Rayearth (1997), Beasts Design, key animation (eps 1, 3)
- Gekiganger III (1998), Animation director (Nadesico part)
- Tenamonya Voyagers (1999), Key animation, key animation (ep 4)
- Read or Die (2001), Key animation (ep 3)
- Gate Keepers 21 (2002), Character design, chief animation director, animation director (eps 1–5, OP), key animation (ep 1, OP 2), SFX animation director
- Uta Kata (2005), Director, storyboard, eyecatch illustration
- Assassination Classroom (2013), Director, storyboard, unit director, key animation
- Chō Jikū Robo Meguru (2014), Director, character designer and animation director

=== Films ===
- Mobile Suit Gundam: Char's Counterattack (1988), 2nd key animation
- Urotsukidōji: Legend of the Overfiend (1989), Key animation
- Gude Crest : The Emblem of Gude (1990), Key animation
- Dragon Quest: Dai no Daibōken (1991), Key animation
- Dragon Quest: Dai no Daibōken Tachiagare! Aban no Shito (1992), Key animation
- Fatal Fury: The Motion Picture (1994), Key animation
- Mahoujin Guru Guru (1996), Key animation
- Mahou Gakuen Lunar! Aoi Ryu no Himitsu (1996), Key animation
- Bakusō Kyōdai Let's & Go!! (1997), In-between assistance
- Martian Successor Nadesico: The Motion Picture – Prince of Darkness (1998), Character design, chief animation director
- Kiddy Grade -Ignition- (2007), Director, eyecatch illustration
- Kiddy Grade -Maelstrom- (2007), Director
- Kiddy Grade -Truth Dawn- (2007), Director
- Afro Samurai: Resurrection (2009), Key animation

=== Manga ===
- Gate Keepers (1999), Original creator, art
