= Ryōko Nagata =

Japanese voice actress

- 永田 亮子
- Born: February 23, 1975 (age 51); Gifu, Japan
- Occupation: voice actress
- Years active: 1998–present
- Agent: Atomic Monkey

Ryōko Nagata (永田 亮子, Nagata Ryōko; born February 23, 1975 in Gifu) is a freelance Japanese voice actress.

== Filmography ==
=== Anime ===
Year	Title	Roles	Note
1998	Magical Stage Fancy Lala	Child actress	
1999	Power Stone	Rogue	
1999	Cybuster	Sayuri Ando	Masou Kinshin Cybuster
2000	Lupin III: Missed by a Dollar	Child actress	
2001	Geneshaft	Ling, Emma	
2001	Go! Go! Itsutsugo Land	Kurumi-sensei	
2001	Rune Soldier	Joan	
2002	Azumanga Daioh	Kaorin's Mother, Female Student A, Announcer (ep6), Female Bank (ep8), Store Clerk (ep 9), Nurse (ep 24)	
2002	Heat Guy J	Cynthia	
2002–2003	Kiddy Grade	Éclair	
2003	Mermaid Melody Pichi Pichi Pitch	Noel	
2003	Last Exile	Wina Lightning	
2004	Uta Kata	Hinata Sensei	
2005	Onegai My Melody	Mana's Mother	
2005	Canvas 2: Akane-iro no Palette	Aya Misaki	Episode 4
2005	Solty Rei	Jeremy Kobel	
2006	The Melancholy of Haruhi Suzumiya	Takako Nakanishi	
2006	Black Blood Brothers	Mimiko Katsuragi	
2006	Red Garden	Emma Ashley	
2008	Stitch!	Kawasaki-sensei	
2009	Kiddy Girl-and	Eclair	
2011	Last Exile	Lina Lighting	Fam, The Silver Wing
2014–2019	Yo-kai Watch	Keita's Mother, Kyubi, Oiran, Hikikomori, Donyorinne, Mekabu-chan, Katanori-kozo/oyakata	
2016–2017	Maho Girls PreCure	Chikurun	
2020	Detective Conan	Aiko Midorikawa	ep. 972

=== Movies ===
Year	Title	Roles	Note
2007	Kiddy Grade: Ignition	Eclair	
2007	Kiddy Grade: Maelstrom	Eclair	
2007	Kiddy Grade: Truth of Dawn	Eclair	
2014	Yo-kai Watch: The Movie	Keita's Mother, Kyubi, Oiran, Hikikomori, Donyorinne, Mekabu-chan, Katanori-kozo/oyakata	Yo-kai Watch: Tanjō no Himitsu da Nyan!

=== OVA/ONA ===
Year	Title	Roles	Note
2001–2002	Magical Play 2D	Ketchup	OVA
2001	Magical Play 3D	Ketchup	ONA
2005	Growlanser IV	Remus	

=== Video games ===
Year	Title	Roles	Note
2001	Eithea	Prada	
2003	Growlanser: Wayfarer of Time	Remus	
2004	Inuyasha: The Secret of the Cursed Mask	Kaname Kururugi	Main female playable character
2005	Shadow Hearts: From the New World	Shania	
2006	Phantasy Star Universe	Liina Sukaya, Pete	
2007	Super Robot Wars: Original Generations	Laila	
2007	Super Robot Wars Original Generation Gaiden	Laila	
2008	Phantasy Star Portable	Liina Sukaya	PSP Ver.

== Dubbing roles ==
=== Ashley Tisdale ===
Year	Title	Roles	Note
2005–2008	The Suite Life of Zack & Cody	Maddie Fitzpatrick	
2006–2011	High School Musical	Sharpay Evans	Movie series
2007–2015	Phineas and Ferb	Candace Flynn	TV series & movies
2008	The Suite Life on Deck	Maddie Fitzpatrick	Maddie on Deck – S1, Ep13
2016	Milo Murphy's Law	Candace Flynn	S2, E1 (crossover with Phineas and Ferb)
2020	Phineas and Ferb the Movie: Candace Against the Universe	Candace Flynn	Disney+ (JP)

=== Other ===
==== Live-action ====
Year	Title	Roles	Dub for	Note
2001–2011	Smallville	Chloe Sullivan	Allison Mack	
2006	Little Miss Sunshine	Oliver Hoover	Abigail Breslin	
2008	Shutter	Jane Shaw	Rachael Taylor	
2010	Drop Dead Diva	Deb Dobkins	Brooke D'Orsay	
2014	The Fault in Our Stars	Hazel Grace Lancaster	Shailene Woodley	
2019	Elizabeth Harvest	Elizabeth	Abbey Lee	
2021	Don't Look Up	June Mindy	Melanie Lynskey	

==== Animation ====
Year	Title	Roles	Note
2008	The Pirates Who Don't Do Anything: A VeggieTales Movie	Princess Eloise	
