= Hidefumi Kimura =

Japanese artist, writer and animator (born 1965)

- Born: March 12, 1965 (age 61); Aomori, Japan
- Occupations: Artist; Writer; Animator
- Years active: 1988-present

Hidefumi Kimura (きむら ひでふみ, Kimura Hidefumi; born March 12, 1965) is a Japanese artist, writer and animator. He is a member of gímik, along with Keiji Gotoh and Megumi Kadonosono, and is responsible for composing the scenarios and writing most of the episodic screenplays for their anime, and for writing some of the related manga and light novels. Some of his major works in illustration include Generator Gawl, Kiddy Grade, and Avenger.

== Works ==
=== Anime television series ===
- Generator Gawl (1998): Series composition, screenplay
- Space Pirate Mito (1999): screenplay
- Dai-Guard (1999): Science fiction concept, screenplay (episodes 14, 19, and 20)
- Love Hina (2000): screenplay
- Sister Princess (2001): stage manager
- Full Metal Panic! (2002): screenplay
- Magical Shopping Arcade Abenobashi (2002): setting design
- Kiddy Grade (2002): Series composition, Screenplay (episodes 1–3, 6, 8, 10–11, 15–17, and 20–24), Storyboards (episodes 9, 14, 16, and 20), Key animation (episodes 1, 10, and 20), Eyecatch illustration (episode 22)
- Avenger (2003): Series composition, screenplay
- Uta Kata (2004): Series composition, screenplay
- Kishin Taisen Gigantic Formula (2007): Series composition, screenplay, Storyboards (episodes 12, 16, 22, and 25)
- Kiddy Girl-and (2009): Series composition, screenplay
- Shin-Men (2010): screenplay
- Freezing (2011): setting supervisor
- Crayon Shin-chan (2012): screenplay
- Freezing Vibration (2013): setting design, monitor design, key animation
- Dai-Shogun - Great Revolution (2014): scene designer, monitor design
- The Silver Guardian (2017): Series composition, screenplay
- Cardfight!! Vanguard GZ (2017): unit design
- Dies Irae: To the Ring Reincarnation (2018): screenplay
- Fairy Tail (2019): dragon design
- A Certain Scientific Accelerator (2019): prop design, storyboards
- Do You Love Your Mom and Her Two-Hit Multi-Target Attacks? (2019): prop design, storyboards
- Yu-Gi-Oh! Sevens (2020): monster design
- Mewkledreamy (2020): storyboards
- Farmagia (2025): prop design

=== OVAs ===
- Agent Aika (1997): mechanical design
- Labyrinth of Flames (2000): mechanical design
- éX-Driver (2001): mechanical design
- Fragtime (2019): background art

=== Movies ===
- Crayon Shin-chan: The Legend Called Buri Buri 3 Minutes Charge (2005): screenplay, storyboards
- Crayon Shin-chan: The Legend Called: Dance! Amigo! (2006): storyboards
- Kiddy Grade -Ignition- (April 2007): Series composition, screenplay
- Kiddy Grade -Maelstrom- (June 2007): Series composition, screenplay
- Kiddy Grade -Truth Dawn- (September 2007): Series composition, screenplay

=== Manga ===
- Kiddy Grade Reverse (2003), author
- Kiddy Girl-and Pure (2009), author

=== Novels ===
- Kiddy Grade Pr. (2001), illustrator
- Kiddy Grade (2002), author
- Gemini Knives (2006), author
- Kiddy Girl-and (2010), author
