= Uta Kata =

Japanese anime series and its adaptations

- Uta∽Kata
- Logo by gímik・HAL/Bandai Visual for Uta Kata

うた∽かた (詩片)
- Genre: Fantasy, romance, magical girl, drama
- Created by: gímik
- Anime television series
- Directed by: Keiji Gotoh
- Produced by: Jun Yukawa; Katsunori Haruta
- Written by: Hidefumi Kimura
- Music by: Megumi Oohashi
- Studio: Hal Film Maker
- Licensed by: NA: Sentai Filmworks
- Original network: TV Kanagawa, Chiba TV, TV Saitama, TV Aichi, Hiroshima Home TV, TV Hokkaido, SUN, Tokyo MX, TVQ, Kids Station
- Original run: October 3, 2004 – December 18, 2004
- Episodes: 12
- Manga
- Written by: Keito Koume
- Published by: MediaWorks
- Magazine: Dengeki Daioh
- Original run: October 2004 – April 2005
- Volumes: 1
- Original video animation

Shotō no Futanatsu
- Directed by: Keiji Gotoh
- Written by: Hidefumi Kimura
- Music by: Megumi Oohashi
- Studio: Hal Film Maker
- Licensed by: NA: Sentai Filmworks
- Released: April 22, 2005
- Runtime: 24 minutes
- Light novel
- Written by: Hidefumi Kimura
- Illustrated by: Megumi Kadonosono
- Published by: Bandai Visual
- Published: April 22, 2005
- Volumes: 1
- icon

Uta∽Kata (うた∽かた (詩片); lit. 'Poem Fragment') is a 2004 anime television series. Written differently (泡沫), the title can refer to bubbles and is used as such in the ending theme.

The series can be loosely considered a magical girl story. However, this series deviates from more conventional magical girl themes in that it addresses topics that are for a more mature audience, such as child abuse, eating disorders, and possibly misanthropy. Nevertheless, it illustrates the main character's coming of age with each episode, becoming more and more emotionally intense as the story goes on.

The story follows Ichika Tachibana's life over a summer holiday when she meets Manatsu Kuroki. The series details their summer activities and the use of special creatures called Djinn (ジン jin) that lend their powers to Ichika to help her and her friends when they invariably find themselves in danger and eventually for their own motives.

== Plot ==
On the day before the summer holiday, Ichika Tachibana discovers that the charm attached to her cell phone has somehow wound up inside a mirror in the old school building. A girl named Manatsu Kuroki, inside the mirror, offers to return the charm and phone in exchange for a favor. When Ichika accepts, Manatsu emerges from the mirror, but Ichika finds to her chagrin that the charm's stones have taken on different colors. Her indignation soon turns to delight as she is transformed by the charm and given an incredibly moving experience in the skies above Kamakura.

After returning to the old classroom, Manatsu asks that Ichika use all the colored stones in the charm and record her experiences and thoughts. Starting with the facade of Manatsu as her text-message pal, Ichika begins to entangle herself in a web of small lies and deceptions.

When Ichika faces dangers during the summer holiday, she at first uses the Djinn's power in the stones to resolve them supernaturally. But as the summer draws on, she begins to use the power even though there is no imminent danger. Through each experience with the Djinn she learns about her willfulness and that of others. Slowly, the power of the Djinn erodes her emotional, physical, and mental strength, and she abuses the power to the point of attempting murder.

Meanwhile, Ichika's tutors, Sei and Kai, are tormented by Ichika's ordeal — Sei went through the very same thing six years ago. They very much want to prevent Ichika from experiencing the same trials but are bound to the rules of the ritual. When Sei tried to interfere, he was turned into stone as a penalty. Although Ichika tries to abandon using the Djinn's power altogether, she finds herself losing control over her actions. Faced with fear, sadness, or anger, she finds that the Djinn grant her power against her will. Not only this, she finds that she cannot discard the charm, as it will fly back to her.

Ichika had been subjected to a ritual judgment determined from the time she was conceived. Saya, the final Djinn, would take a person of fourteen years — the age between the innocence of childhood and the hardness of adulthood — and show him or her the world through the eyes of the Djinn. The individual would experience seven trials that contrasted seven virtues and sins: affection and resentment, temperance and hubris, devotion and rebellion, honesty and treachery, reason and envy, passion and lust, wisdom and machination. When Ichika is thus led to despair in humanity and disgust of herself, Saya binds her to the mirror and asks her to decide whether to destroy humanity or herself.

In response, Ichika refuses to choose either. Saya declares that as a violation of the rules and drives her scythe toward Ichika's body. Sei shatters his stone skin and tries to stop the scythe, but Ichika decides that it is better that she die rather than see him hurt. Manatsu, in defiance, drives herself into the scythe, saving Ichika's life. Kai returns the life energy that kept him in human form to Sei, and he and Manatsu revert to their original forms: shards of the old mirror.

When school resumed in the fall, Ichika decided to remain at Kamakura rather than join her parents in Italy. Elsewhere, Saya determined to move on and judge the next teenager.

=== OVA ===
In the OVA Shotō no Futanatsu (初冬の双夏; Twin Summers of the First Winter), Ichika hears that Manatsu has been seen again, one week before her birthday. Not long after the fall term had begun, Sei had transferred to a German university in an exchange program. On Christmas Eve, both discover that Manatsu and Kai's shards had vanished, and they reunite with Ichika and Sei, respectively. They had returned for one last night and to say goodbye. After an evening with Ichika and Sei, the shards return to Saya's old mirror during the night. The next spring, Ichika enters a new school year with her friends, while Saya's experiments continue with a new test subject.

== Characters ==
From left to right: Michiru, Keiko, Satsuki, Manatsu and Ichika

Ichika Tachibana (橘 一夏, Tachibana Ichika)
Ichika is a 14-year-old Japanese middle school student living in Kamakura, who discovers on the day before summer holiday that a gift from her tutor is much more than a good-luck charm.
She is honest and polite to everyone, including her own parents, and always tries to do the right thing. She detests lying, especially if she finds herself doing it. As a result, her friends often playfully tease her for being straight-laced. Ichika is easily scared, and the thought of ghosts terrifies her, especially when she first sees Manatsu in a mirror they find in the school's oldest building.
Voiced by Yōko Honda
Manatsu Kuroki (黒城 舞夏, Kuroki Manatsu)
Manatsu is a girl that Ichika met in dreams and a mirror.
Manatsu seems to be the polar opposite of Ichika in personality. When Ichika is hesitant, Manatsu is carefree and assertive; where the former is reserved, the latter is cheerfully outgoing. She also has striking similarities to Ichika — she knows and loves many of the same things Ichika does, and she shares the same fear of ghosts.
Voiced by Masumi Asano
Satsuki Takigawa (多岐川 皐月, Takigawa Satsuki)
Ichika introduces her friend Satsuki as "a very responsible and strong person. You can always count on her." She is a brash girl who often takes the lead of Ichika and the other friends. A painful memory causes her to avoid most boys, despite her seemingly strong personality. Satsuki has an older brother, with whom she apparently gets along well, despite the fact that they bicker a fair bit.
Voiced by Tomoko Kawakami
Keiko Takamura (篁 蛍子, Takamura Keiko)
Ichika describes her friend Keiko as "a proper young lady from a good family, gentle and kind." She is easily amused by simple things, such as shaking a duster in a sunbeam. Her parents appear to be rather controlling, which causes Keiko some distress in regard to a boy she liked.
Voiced by Yurika Ochiai
Michiru Munakata (宗方 未知留, Munakata Michiru)
Ichika says of her friend Michiru, "She's really into literature, and her instincts are amazingly sharp." Due to being a miko and having the "power of vision", she can allegedly see ghosts and spirits. She is a quiet, if not shy, person. Michiru has a younger sister named Rui, of whose feelings she appears to be rather protective. Michiru is prone to making slightly odd comments and is unable to swim in the sea, claiming her skin is sensitive to saltwater. She tends to speak in a subdued tone of voice.
Voiced by Yukari Tamura
Sei Tōdō (藤堂 誓唯, Tōdō Sei)
Sei is one of Ichika's tutors and a high school student. He instructs her in grammar, literature, and social sciences. He is introduced as the twin brother of Kai. Of the two, Sei usually seems to be the calmer, gentler one. Ichika has developed romantic feelings for him.
Voiced by Nobuo Tobita
Kai Tōdō (藤堂 繪委, Tōdō Kai)
Kai is Ichika's other tutor. He teaches her math and science. He is introduced as the twin brother of Sei. Of the two, Kai seems the more extroverted one and more physical. He is in love with his twin brother.
Voiced by Nobutoshi Kanna
Saya Kogure (小暮 沙耶, Kogure Saya)
Saya is an enigmatic woman who is, at times, hidden from view of most people. She is the Tachibanas' next door neighbor and is in the fashion industry.
But this is only an illusion — she covertly pushes circumstances in Ichika's life to bring her to use the power of the Djinns. She can move anywhere at will, turn her scarf into a deadly scythe and other objects and keeps an eye on Ichika throughout the series. She strictly enforces rules concerning the activation of the stones: The current bearer must remain completely in the dark as to their true nature and purpose and no one may interfere with the bearer's decision to use the power.
Voiced by Maria Kawamura

== Episode list ==
Similar to gímik's earlier work, Kiddy Grade (where a different guest artist drew the eyecatches for each episode), each episode's main costume was designed by a guest artist who also created artwork for the ending sequence of that episode.

Each episode preview in the anime was narrated by Ichika in the style of a diary entry. On the website, a corresponding entry narrated by Manatsu is available.

In a possible variation of the four-character yojijukugo, every title is composed of a pair of two-kanji words separated by a no particle. A literal, if rough, translation of most titles can be derived by assembling the phrase "[second word] of (the) [first word]".

The TV series and OVA has been licensed in North America by Sentai Filmworks; anime distributor Section23 Films released the complete collection set on November 2, 2010.

No.	Title	Costume artist	Djinn	Original release date
1	"Early Summer's Encounter" "Kaikō no Shoka" (邂逅の初夏)	Megumi Kadonosono (Kiddy Grade, Legend of Himiko)	Sun (陽, Yō)	October 3, 2004
On the day before summer holiday, Ichika meets a girl in a mirror, Manatsu.
2	"The Neighboring Night Sky" "Kinsetsu no Yozora" (近接の夜空)	"SUEZEN" (Shining Force 2, Yadamon, Marine Colour)	Moon (月, Getsu)	October 10, 2004
An old friend's former boyfriend causes some trouble for Ichika and Manatsu.
3	"The Heat of the Sandy Beach" "Shōnetsu no Sunahama" (焦熱の砂浜)	Hajime Ueda (FLCL, Q-Ko-Chan: The Earth Invader Girl)	Earth (地, Chi)	October 17, 2004
While rescuing a former classmate at the beach, Ichika loses her father's very valuable watch.
4	"Sudden Shower by the Lake Shore" "Shūu no Kohan" (驟雨の湖畔)	Keinojou Mizutama (Brigadoon)	Water (水, Sui)	October 23, 2004
During a camping trip, a girl in Ichika's cabin becomes stranded in a hole while attempting to meet a boy.
5	"The Flowering of Tears" "Rakurui no Raika" (落涙の蕾花)	"Kaishaku" (Magical Nyan Nyan Taruto, Steel Angel Kurumi)	Fire (焔, En)	October 30, 2004
Satsuki develops a crush on a boy she meets on the day of the fireworks festival.
6	"The Flush of Damp Skin" "Nurehada no Binetsu" (濡肌の微熱)	Hidefumi Kimura (Agent Aika, Abenobashi)	Heaven (天, Ten)	November 11, 2004
Ichika sees Sei-san with her neighbor Saya-san and as she runs away she breaks her pearl necklace.
7	"The Jealousy of a Twig" "Konure no Shitto" (木末の嫉妬)	"Keiko" (figurine designer)	Wind (風, Fū)	November 13, 2004
Ichika discovers that she is changing unusually. After a gust of wind scatters Kai's homework report, Ichika resolves to recover it.
8	"The Impulse of a Falling Flower" "Sange no Shōdō" (散華の衝動)	Hajime Watanabe (Kodocha)	Flowers (華, Ka)	November 20, 2004
As part of a volunteer activity, Ichika gives a wreath of dried flowers to a mentally unstable hospital patient.
9	"The Pain of Love" "Ren'ai no Tsūyō" (恋愛の痛痒)	Mine Yoshizaki (Sgt. Frog)	Thunder (雷, Rai)	November 27, 2004
A trip with friends to a shrine dedicated to lovers causes Keiko and Satsuki to reflect on unpleasant memories.
10	"Reunion Beyond the Grave" "Shishō no Saikai" (死生の再会)	Rikdo Koshi (Excel Saga)	Darkness (冥, Mei)	November 27, 2004
Ichika finds that she cannot cast away the magic charm. The Tachibana family visits the graves of their ancestors, and Ichika has a reunion of her own.
11	"The Surge of Separation" "Betsuri no Hadō" (別離の波動)	Ken Akamatsu (Love Hina, Negima)	Sea (海, Kai)	December 11, 2004
Ichika dreams a new dream about Manatsu and herself. When Michiru attempts to find out the truth, the power of the Djinn sends disaster her way.
12	"The Poetry of Fragments" "Kakera no Uta" (欠片の詩歌)	Keiji Gotoh (Martian Successor Nadesico, Gate Keepers)	Mirror (鏡, Kyō)	December 18, 2004
Ichika ventures into the house next door to determine the truth once and for all.
13 (OVA)	"Twin Summers of the First Winter" "Shotō no Futanatsu" (初冬の双夏)	-	-	April 22, 2005
Kai and Manatsu revisit their "reflections" one last time.

== Staff credits ==
- Planning: gímik, Hal Film Maker
- Original Story: gímik
- Director: Keiji Gotoh
- Screenplay: Hidefumi Kimura
- Character Design & Art Director: Megumi Kadonosono
- Background Art: Tokumitsu Kobayashi
- Art Director: Hisaharu Iijima
- Color Design: Yoshimi Kawakami
- CGI Director: Atsushi Takeyama
- Photography Director: Tomoyuki Sakurada
- Editing: Shigeru Nishiyama
- Sound Director: Hitoshi Aketagawa
- Sound Effects Production: Magic Capsule
- Music: Megumi Oohashi
- Music Production: Victor Entertainment
- Production: Bandai Visual

== Theme songs ==
- Opening Theme: Omoi wo Kanadete (想いを奏でて)
- Ending Theme: Itsuka Tokeru Namida (いつか溶ける涙)
  - Artist: savage genius
- Insert song (episode 3): Kono Natsu wo Kakaete
  - Artist: Sachiko & Chino
- Insert song (episode 3): Zutto Kono Machi de
  - Artist: emiko

== Reaction ==
The Anime Encyclopedia: A Guide to Japanese Animation Since 1917 compares the series' underlying themes to those of Mahoromatic, noting that the story is "an allegory of the end of childhood and one last vacation before the responsibilities of the grown-up world start to impinge". It criticizes the OVA episode, calling it "a rather pointless rehash that to some minds betrays the elegiac quality of the original series—if everything can be reset and reprised à la Tenchi Muyo!, where's the drama?"
