= 英文 =

英文 may refer to:

- "English" in the Chinese language
- Hidefumi, Japanese given name
- Ing-wen, Chinese given name of the Taiwanese politician, Tsai Ing-wen, who has served as the president of the Republic of China (Taiwan)
