= R-15 (novel series) =

Japanese light novel and its adaptations

- Cover of the first light novel
- Genre: Harem, romantic comedy
- Light novel
- Written by: Hiroyuki Fushimi
- Illustrated by: Takuya Fujima
- Published by: Kadokawa Shoten
- Imprint: Kadokawa Sneaker Bunko
- Magazine: The Sneaker
- Original run: July 1, 2009 – August 1, 2012
- Volumes: 11
- Manga
- Written by: Hiroyuki Fushimi
- Illustrated by: Hayato Ōhashi
- Published by: Kadokawa Shoten
- Magazine: Monthly Shōnen Ace
- Original run: June 2010 – January 2012
- Volumes: 4
- Anime television series
- Directed by: Munenori Nawa
- Written by: Sumio Uetake
- Music by: Yuichi Nonaka
- Studio: AIC; Remic (Episode 9) (Note: Several episode of the series are outsourced to other studios, including episode 4 which was outsourced to Remic. However, each of these episodes credits AIC as the main contractor for the outsources, with the exception of episode 9 that solely credits Remic for "Animation Production" (アニメーション制作).)
- Original network: tvk, SUN, Teletama, CTC, Gifu Hōso, Tokyo MX, Mie TV, AT-X
- Original run: July 10, 2011 – September 25, 2011
- Episodes: 12 + OVA
- Video game

R-15 Portable
- Publisher: Kadokawa Shoten
- Genre: Visual novel
- Platform: PlayStation Portable
- Released: October 27, 2011

R-15 (あーるじゅうご, Āru Jūgo) is a Japanese light novel series written by Hiroyuki Fushimi and illustrated by Takuya Fujima. The first volume was published by Kadokawa Shoten in July 2009 and eleven volumes have been released as of August 2012. A manga adaptation illustrated by Hayato Ōhashi started serialization in the June 2010 issue of Kadokawa Shoten's Monthly Shōnen Ace magazine. An anime television series adaptation animated by AIC aired in Japan from July to September 2011.

== Plot ==
R-15 is about a boy, Taketo Akutagawa, who attends a school for geniuses: Inspiration Academy Private High School. Taketo is a genius novelist and writes erotica. Despite negative perceptions many people have of him, he aims to be at the top of his class and be recognized as the world's greatest writer.

=== Characters ===
In this series, most of the names of the characters have some connection to that particular character's field of interest.

Taketo Akutagawa (芥川 丈途, Akutagawa Taketo)
Voiced by: Aya Gōda
A genius at writing erotic fiction. He is looked down upon by most of the other students, especially the girls who consider him a pervert. He also works on the academy's newspaper as a reporter and interviewer. He often gets nosebleeds whenever he finds himself in a state of sexual arousal. As time passes by people's thoughts about him change and he attracts some admirers like Utae, Raika, and Fukune. Taketo's love interest is Fukune. The name Akutagawa can also mean "river of garbage", referring to the flood of erotic writing Taketo is producing when he is inspired.

Fukune Narukara (鳴唐 吹音, Narukara Fukune)
Voiced by: Yurina Fukuhara
A genius clarinetist. She is a shy girl who forms a close relationship with Taketo after he attempts to interview her and helps her in times of need. Although she knows Taketo is an author, she does not know he writes erotic fiction. Fukune is an awkward person to talk to because she doesn't reply often. Fukune has a tendency to read things aloud whenever she sees them, even repeating what she hears while asleep. Fukune's father is also a famous clarinetist. She tries her best to live up to his expectations; she constantly practices, leaving little time to go out. This changes when she's with Taketo and she seems to develop feelings for him. Her given name "Fukune" means "sound of a wind instrument".

Raika Meiki (名機 来夏, Meiki Raika)
Voiced by: Mana Komatsu
A genius photographer. She often works with Taketo on the academy's newspaper. She likes taking photographs of Taketo during his most embarrassing moments. Because Taketo is her most useful model, she helps him in difficult situations so she can stay with him and take more photos. Raika also seems to have some kind of feelings for Taketo to the point that she doesn't mind Taketo thinking about her in a perverted way; she also stated that they're both ugly creatures and that they would make a good pair. Raika's given name is derived from Leica, a brand of cameras.

Kurumi Kuroki (黒樹 繰美, Kuroki Kurumi)
Voiced by: Yui Ariga
The Newspaper Circle Chief. She runs the academy's newspaper for which Taketo writes articles and Raika takes photos. She is a first-rate genius even by the standards at Inspiration Academy. She is normally seen protected by two bodyguards and wearing a latex uniform with her top open, exposing her breasts. The chief has a lot of secrets; secrets that should not be browsed by people because some things in this world should not be revealed.

Utae Sonokoe (園声 謡江, Sonokoe Utae)
Voiced by: Nanami Kashiyama
A genius pop idol. She is one of the most popular girls in the academy. She is also one of the few people who does not mind Taketo's erotic writing, admiring the fact he works in a difficult genre. Utae harbors feelings for Taketo ever since he helped her overcome a problem. She tries to go on date with Taketo but failed because of her shyness that people might find out. Her name can also mean "sing with that voice".

Ran Musen (霧線 蘭, Musen Ran)
Voiced by: Kayoko Tsumita
A genius computer programmer. She looks down on Taketo the most out of all the students, often calling him a porno writer. With her skills she is able to hack into government satellites and computers. Ran's hacking abilities are so superior that she can hack anything. Ran is shown to be only interested in girls and hates Taketo, but this changes after Taketo helps rescue Fukune from Beni Botan. Her name means "wireless LAN". Musen means Wireless and Ran is as it sounds.

Tsukuru Kagaku (香学 創, Kagaku Tsukuru)
Voiced by: Midori Tsukimiya
A genius inventor. She is a scientist who has invented several machines and devices; most of these malfunction in some capacity, usually causing Taketo problems. She is normally seen wearing a white lab coat. Her name means "building science".

Ritsu Enshū (円周 率, Enshū Ritsu)
Voiced by: Madoka Murakami
A genius mathematician. He is Taketo's closest friend and the one who tries to defend Taketo's work. He often gets aroused when Taketo talks innocently during conversation. Taketo makes him calm down by getting him to recite π. His name means π in Japanese.

Botan Beni (紅 牡丹, Beni Botan)
Voiced by: Iori Nomizu
A genius avant-garde artist. She is known for painting people's bodies and using other students as her canvases. Her family name "Beni" means "crimson"; a pigment.

== Media ==
=== Light novels ===
The R-15 light novels are written by Hiroyuki Fushimi, with illustrations by Takuya Fujima. The first volume was published in July 2009 under Kadokawa Shoten's Kadokawa Sneaker Bunko imprint. The last volume, number eleven was published July 31, 2012.

No.	Title	Release date	ISBN
01	Welcome to the Genius Academy! Yōkoso Tensai Gakuen e! (ようこそ天才学園へ!)	July 1, 2009	978-4-04-474701-5
02	Hello, My First Love; Konnichi wa, Boku no Hatsukoi (こんにちは、ぼくの初恋)	October 1, 2009	978-4-04-474702-2
03	Nice to Meet You Love Triangle! Hajimemashite Sankaku Kankei! (初めまして三角関係!)	January 1, 2010	978-4-04-474703-9
04	Traitor's Farewell; Uragirimono no Sayōnara (裏切り者のさようなら)	June 1, 2010	978-4-04-474704-6
05	Best Regards Queen's Classroom! Yoroshiku Joō-sama no Kyōshitsu! (よろしく女王様の教室!)	September 1, 2010	978-4-04-474705-3
06	Good Evening Academy Collapse; Konban wa Gakuen Hōkai (こんばんは学園崩壊)	December 1, 2010	978-4-04-474706-0
07	Thank You Girl's Secret; Itadakimasu Onna no Ko no Himitsu (いただきます女の子の秘密)	April 1, 2011	978-4-04-474707-7
08	Graduation Leadership Start! Sotsugyō Shidō Sutāto! (卒業指導スタート!)	July 1, 2011	978-4-04-474708-4
09	School Idol World Job Hunting! ? 学園アイドルの世界就活！？	August 31, 2011	978-4-04-474709-1
10	Camera Girl's Pure Love Slump! ? カメラ少女の純愛スランプ！？	December 28, 2011	978-4-04-100082-3
11	Final guidance for R-15 Happy End! ! R-15 ハッピーエンドへの最終指導！！	July 31, 2012	978-4-04-100449-4

=== Manga ===
A manga adaptation illustrated by Hayato Ōhashi began serialization in the June 2010 issue of Kadokawa Shoten's Monthly Shōnen Ace manga magazine. The first tankōbon volume was released on November 26, 2010; the fourth and last volume was released on February 22, 2012. A four-panel comic strip spin-off manga titled Chima R-15 (ちまR-15) and illustrated by Nenga Ninomiya began serialization in volume one of Kadokawa Shoten's 4-koma Nano Ace magazine sold on March 9, 2011. It was collected into one volume on February 22, 2012.

=== Anime ===
An anime television series adaptation animated by AIC, written by Sumio Uetake, and directed by Munenori Nawa aired in Japan from July 10, 2011, to September 25, 2011. An OAD episode was released with the 10th novel volume on December 13, 2011.

No.	Title	Original release date
1	"Welcome to Inspiration Academy!" "Yōkoso Hirameki Gakuen e!"(ようこそ閃学園へ!)	July 10, 2011
Taketo names everything a genius is at school. As he heard music and finds who is using a clarinet, all awhile later she runs away.
2	"An Idol, Even If I Strip!" "Nuidatte Aidoru!"(脱いだってあいどる!)	July 17, 2011
Taketo is assigned to interview Utae, the most popular girl in school. He's nervous because he's not sure how she will react to him. Eventually they become friends.
3	"I Won't Go Away, I Won't Let You Go" "Hanarenai, Hanasanai"(離れない、離さない)	July 24, 2011
Taketo and Fukune got stuck from one of Tsukuru's inventions, and later splitting the two apart. As it happens it goes haywire.
4	"Photo Stories" "Shashin Kidan"(写真奇談)	July 31, 2011
Raika is in need of a good photograph for the school, and decides she wants to take a photo of Taketo being pervy.
5	"Only Girls" "Ikase-ai no Mukō ni"(イカセ愛のムコウに)	August 7, 2011
Fukune is kidnapped by Botan, and Ran tries to find her. But Ran fights with Botan in the ring, when Taketo gives some encouragement.
6	"What If Inspiration Academy's Genius Manager..." "Moshimo Hirameki Gakuen no Tensai manējā ga..."(もしも閃学園の天才マネージャーが...)	August 14, 2011
Taketo is suffering from writer's block. Kurumi locks him in an apartment and gives him 48 hours to meet his deadlines. With him is a young woman that's supposed to cheer him on, but all she does is prolong his writer's block.
7	"Story of the Girl's Dormitory" "Joshi Ryō Monogatari"(女子寮物語)	August 21, 2011
Kurumi gives Taketo a suit that makes him invisible, and tells him to spend the day in the girl's dormitory as research for his work. Naturally, things do not go as planned.
8	"Inspiration Academy's Holiday" "Hirameki no Kyūjitsu"(ひらめきの休日)	August 28, 2011
Everybody is having a free day in Inspiration Academy, and everyone is really excited about this. Taketo decides to go to the town with Ritsu, but he ends up going with the defenseless and innocent Fukune.
9	"Director of X-Files" "Buchō X fairu"(部長Xファイル)	September 4, 2011
Taketo starts becoming suspicious of Kurumi after she mysteriously vanishes. He has Ran hack into the school's database to find out more about her. Things get more puzzling as the story goes on.
10	"Steamy Town Elegy" "Yu no Machi Erejī"(湯の町エレジー)	September 11, 2011
The upperclassmen decide to pit Inspiration Academy's three first-year classes against each other in a talent competition. Taketo must find a way to win for his class.
11	"Our Summertime Blues" "Boku-tachi no Samātaimu Burū"(ボクたちのサマータイムブルー)	September 18, 2011
Fukune is nervous about something and Taketo doesn't know why. Later Fukune's father wants her to transfer out of school.
12	"I Love You" "Daisukida!!"(大好きだ!!)	September 25, 2011
Taketo is conducting a song during a school play, and Fukune shows up. The principal talked to Fukune's father to reconsider. To let others chose to do in the future, and Fukune's father leaves the play.
OVA	"R-15 #Special" "R-15 #Supesharu"(R-15 #すぺしゃる)	December 13, 2011
Taketo, Fukune, Utae and Raika wind up on a remote island after a plane crash.

== Music ==
Opening Theme

- Maji Yaba Mōsō LOVE by R-15 (Aya Gōda, Yurina Fukuhara, Nanami Kashiyama, Mana Komatsu)

Insert Song

- Shiny Memories by Nanami Kashiyama (Episode 1, 2, 10)
- Sensual Eden by Sengakuen (Episode 12)

== See also ==
- Weiß Survive, a manga series illustrated by Takuya Fujima
- Warlords of Sigrdrifa and Highspeed Etoile, original anime television series with character designs by Takuya Fujima
