= In/Spectre =

2011 Japanese novel by Kyo Shirodaira and its adaptations

- Cover of the first edition of the novel

虚構推理 (Kyokō Suiri)
- Genre: Mystery; Romance; Supernatural thriller
- Novel
- Written by: Kyo Shirodaira
- Illustrated by: Hiro Kiyohara
- Published by: Kodansha
- Imprint: Kodansha Novels; Kodansha Bunko
- Published: May 11, 2011
- Manga
- Written by: Kyo Shirodaira
- Illustrated by: Chasiba Katase
- Published by: Kodansha
- English publisher: NA: Kodansha USA
- Magazine: Shōnen Magazine R; Monthly Shōnen Magazine; Magazine Pocket
- Original run: April 20, 2015 – present
- Volumes: 25
- Novel series
- Written by: Kyo Shirodaira
- Illustrated by: Chasiba Katase
- Published by: Kodansha
- Imprint: Kodansha Taiga
- Magazine: Mephisto
- Original run: December 20, 2018 – present
- Volumes: 6
- Anime television series
- Directed by: Keiji Gotoh
- Written by: Noboru Takagi
- Music by: Akihiro Manabe
- Studio: Brain's Base
- Licensed by: Crunchyroll; NA: Viz Media (home video; S1 only); SA/SEA: Muse Communication
- Original network: TV Asahi, MBS, AT-X, BS NTV (S1); Tokyo MX, BS NTV (S2)
- English network: SEA: Animax Asia
- Original run: January 11, 2020 – March 27, 2023
- Episodes: 24
- icon

In/Spectre (Japanese: 虚構推理, Hepburn: Kyokō Suiri), also known as Invented Inference in Japan, is a 2011 Japanese novel published by Kodansha and written by Kyo Shirodaira with illustrations by Hiro Kyohara. In 2019 it was republished with illustrations by Chasiba Katase as part of a series. A manga adaptation with art by Katase has been serialized since April 2015 in Kodansha's shōnen manga magazine Shōnen Magazine R and since December 2019, also in Monthly Shōnen Magazine. It has been collected in twenty-five tankōbon volumes. The manga is published in North America by Kodansha Comics. An anime television series adaptation produced by Brain's Base aired between January and March 2020, with the second season aired between January and March 2023.

== Plot ==
While struggling to get past a break-up with his girlfriend, Kuro Sakuragawa was approached by Kotoko Iwanaga, a girl who declared that she has been in love with Kuro since she met him two years ago. She then tells him that she is a sort of Goddess of Wisdom where she serves as the intermediary between the real world and the supernatural world. Kuro, of course, doubts her at first but after fighting a yōkai in a library, they reveal to each other their true identities. Kuro is actually part monster due to having eaten two different yōkai flesh, giving him the abilities to heal from any wound and to have limited control over the near-future. Kuro agrees to help Kotoko on her various adventures as the peace-keeping Goddess of Wisdom, soon becoming a couple.

== Characters ==
=== Main characters ===
Kotoko Iwanaga (岩永琴子, Iwanaga Kotoko)
Voiced by: Akari Kitō (Japanese); Lizzie Freeman (English)
A young university student with one eye and one leg. She loses her an eye and leg at the age of 11 after she accepts the yōkai's request for her to become their Goddess of Wisdom; because of it, she receives a fake eye and a prosthetic leg, and walks around with the assistance of a cane. Her role as the Goddess of Wisdom is to mediate disputes between yōkai and provide them with knowledge and wisdom when necessary. Kotoko possesses genius-level intellect and is capable of high-quality deductive reasoning, making her an excellent detective. After falling in love with Kuro, she must wait a few years before he splits with Saki, and approaches him to become his new girlfriend. They eventually get together, though she often annoys him.
Kurō Sakuragawa (桜川九郎, Sakuragawa Kurō)
Voiced by: Mamoru Miyano (Japanese); Brandon Winckler (English)
A young university student with total healing and limited future manipulation abilities, which he acquired at the age of 11 due to his grandmother pursuing experiments performed by their ancestors by having him unknowingly consume yōkai flesh. At the cost of his life, he may select a branch of the near future with a somewhat high probability of occurring and make it a reality. His healing powers revive him each time, which grants him a consistent method to control the future. Due to his status as both human and yōkai, he is often seen as a major threat to even the strongest yōkai. Additionally, his flesh is poisonous to yōkai that attempt to eat him. He is currently in a relationship with Kotoko, though he makes it clear that he is constantly annoyed by her.
Saki Yumihara (弓原紗季, Yumihara Saki)
Voiced by: Misato Fukuen (Japanese); Lauren Landa (English)
A young police officer and Kuro's former girlfriend. She was originally set to marry Kuro after graduating from college, but becomes fearful after witnessing Kuro's regenerative powers and leaves him. She meets Kotoko while they both look for clues on the vengeful spirit of Karin Nanase. This leads them to team up along with Kuro to take the spirit down.
Karin Nanase (七瀬かりん, Nanase Karin)
Voiced by: Sumire Uesaka (Japanese); Kayli Mills (English)
A gravure idol who gained a niche following after starring in a late night TV drama. She dies in a freak accident where steel beams fall on her in a construction site. Rikka uses the circumstances of her death to create a wiki about Nanase's vengeful spirit, dubbing her "Steel Lady Nanase." As the wiki gains popularity online, a yōkai forms from the beliefs of the public, and draws her powers and abilities from their imagination. The yōkai wields a steel beam as her weapon and has no face; she also lacks the intelligence and communication ability most regular yōkai have.
Tokunosuke Terada (寺田 徳之助, Terada Tokunosuke)
Voiced by: Kenji Hamada (Japanese); Mick Lauer (English)
A police detective and an associate of Saki, who was interested in her romantically. While investigating the rumors surrounding Steel Lady Nanase, he is killed by her as her first victim.
Rikka Sakuragawa (桜川六花, Sakuragawa Rikka)
Voiced by: Mayumi Sako (Japanese); Cristina Vee (English)
The older cousin of Kuro, whom he visits in the hospital on a regular basis. She is diagnosed with a long-term illness, but is in reality unhealthy only because she has received the same powers as Kuro, just with more negative side effects. She utilizes her abilities to create Steel Lady Nanase, intent on bringing chaos to the world.
Masayuki Muroi (室井昌幸, Muroi Masayuki)
Voiced by: Makoto Furukawa (Japanese); Kaiji Tang (English)
Kazuyuki Konno
Voiced by: Shimba Tsuchiya
Marumi Oki
Voiced by: Kana Ichinose

=== Yōkai ===
Kappa (河童)
Voiced by: Yoshimitsu Shimoyama
Ochimusha (落武者)
Voiced by: Yoshimitsu Shimoyama
Ushi no Ayakashi (牛のあやかし)
Voiced by: Yoshimitsu Shimoyama
Yama no Ayakashi (山のあやかし)
Voiced by: Kaori Motoyama, Rena Maeda
Komainu (black) (狛犬(黒))
Voiced by: Manami Hanawa (Japanese); Deva Marie Gregory (English)
Komainu (white) (狛犬(白))
Voiced by: Kaori Motoyama (Japanese); Jennifer Losi (English)
Yōko (妖狐)
Voiced by: Kaori Motoyama, Manami Hanawa
Bakedanuki (化け狸)
Voiced by: Hiroki Gotō (Japanese); Bill Rogers (English)
Nushi no Orochi (ヌシの大蛇)
Voiced by: Kōki Miyata (Japanese); Chris Cason (English)
Yosuzume (夜雀)
Voiced by: Rena Maeda (Japanese); Jennifer Losi (English)
Kodama no Genichirō (木魂の源一郎)
Voiced by: Nobuo Tobita
Bakeneko (化け猫)
Voiced by: Haruka Ōminami
Yuki-Onna (雪女)
Voiced by: Aoi Yūki (Japanese); Emi Lo (English)

== Media ==
=== Novel ===
In/Spectre is a novel written by Kyo Shirodaira with illustrations by Hiro Kyohara that was released in 2011 on Kodansha's Kodansha Novels imprint (as Invented Inference: Steel Lady Nanase (虚構推理 鋼人瀬, Kyokou Suiri: Kojin Nanase)) and was republished in 2015 under Kodansha Bunko imprint without the subtitle. In 2018, it changed imprint to Kodansha Taiga and the illustrator to Chasiba Katase, and has continued as a series since then, with the original novel republished as part of the series in 2019. Some short stories collected in the series have been previously published in the Mephisto magazine.

=== Manga ===
A manga adaptation by Chasiba Katase originally began on the Kodansha's Shōnen Magazine R in April 2015. In October 2019, Kodansha announced that Shōnen Magazine R would stop its print publication and be a digital-only publication, and with it, they also announced that the manga would be published in Monthly Shōnen Magazine, starting on December 6, 2019, along with the digital release on Shōnen Magazine R and on the Magazine Pocket app. Shōnen Magazine R was discontinued in January 2023. The manga is published in North America by Kodansha Comics.

=== Anime ===
An anime television series adaptation of the manga series was announced on January 14, 2019. It is produced by Brain's Base and directed by Keiji Gotoh, with Noboru Takagi writing the scripts and Takatoshi Honda designing the characters. It aired between January 11 and March 28, 2020, on TV Asahi, MBS, and BS-NTV for 12 episodes. Lie and a Chameleon performed the series' opening theme song "Mononoke in the Fiction" (モノノケ・イン・ザ・フィクション), while Mamoru Miyano performed the series' ending theme song "Last Dance".

The anime was co-produced by Crunchyroll, as part of their "Crunchyroll Originals" brand, streaming it on their service. Viz Media released the series on home video.

On November 26, 2020, it was announced that the series would receive a second season. The staff reprised their roles, with Kentarou Matsumoto replacing Takatoshi Honda as character designer and chief animation director. The series was scheduled to air in October 2022, but was later delayed. It aired from January 9 to March 27, 2023, on Tokyo MX and BS-NTV. The opening theme song is "Yotogibanashi" (ヨトギバナシ) by KanoeRana, while the ending theme song is "Invincible Love" by Mamoru Miyano.

== Reception ==
The manga had over two million volumes in print by 2019. In 2018, it was nominated for Best Shōnen Manga at the 42nd annual Kodansha Manga Award.

== See also ==
- Blast of Tempest, another manga series written by Kyo Shirodaira
- Spiral: The Bonds of Reasoning, another manga series written by Kyo Shirodaira
