= Hidefumi =

- Gender: Male

Origin
- Origin: Japanese
- Meaning: Different meanings depending on the kanji used

Hidefumi (written: 英文 or 秀史) is a masculine Japanese given name. Notable people with the name include:

- Ino Hidefumi (猪野 秀史; born 1970), Japanese jazz and electronic musician
- Hidefumi Kimura (きむら ひでふみ; born 1965), Japanese artist, writer and animator
- Hidefumi Takemoto (竹本 英文; born 1973), Japanese voice actor
