= Chiharu Kitaoka =

Japanese voice actress

- 喜多丘 千陽
- Born: December 16, 1988 (age 37); Kitami, Hokkaido, Japan
- Occupation: Voice actress

Chiharu Kitaoka (喜多丘 千陽, Kitaoka Chiharu; born December 16, 1988), also known Aya Gōda (合田 彩, Gōda Aya), is a Japanese voice actress from Kitami, Hokkaido, Japan. She was affiliated with Production Ace Engi Kenkyuujo and graduated from Yoyogi Animation Gakuin. Kitaoka made her voice acting debut in Kiddy Girl-and (2009) under the stage name Aya Gouda. She went on to use that name until she left the Production Ace agency in September 2012.

== Filmography ==
=== Anime ===
2009

- Kiddy Girl-and as Q-feuille

2010

- Sora no Otoshimono: Forte as Chika Yanagisawa (eps 6, 9, 11–12), Girl (eps 4–5), Radio (ep 10)

2011

- A Dark Rabbit Has Seven Lives as Saeko Suzae
- Kore wa Zombie Desu ka? as Sarasvati / Kirara Hoshikawa, Female student (ep 6)
- Maken-ki! as Furan Takaki
- R-15 as Taketo Akutagawa

2012

- Kore wa Zombie Desu ka? of the Dead as Sarasvati / Kirara Hoshikawa
- Recorder and Randsell as Takumi

2014

- Atelier Escha & Logy: Alchemists of the Dusk Sky as Threia Hazelgrimm
- Robot Girls Z as DanDan

=== ONA/OVA ===
2011

- Toei Robot Girls as Dan Dan / Danguard Ace

2012

- Upotte!! as Ichihachi (AR18)
