= Gigantic Formula =

Japanese anime television series

- Kishin Taisen Gigantic Formula
- Logo from the opening theme

機神大戦 ギガンティック・フォーミュラ (Kishin Taisen Gigantikku Fōmyura)
- Genre: Mecha, Science fiction
- Anime television series
- Directed by: Keiji Gotoh
- Written by: Hidefumi Kimura
- Music by: Hiroyuki Sawano
- Studio: Brain's Base
- Original network: TV Tokyo, TV Hokkaido, TV Osaka, TV Setouchi, AT-X, TV Aichi, TVQ Kyushu Broadcasting
- Original run: April 4, 2007 – September 26, 2007
- Episodes: 26
- Manga
- Written by: Shōhei Oka
- Published by: ASCII Media Works
- Magazine: Dengeki Daioh
- Original run: March 21, 2007 – August 27, 2008
- Volumes: 2

Mechanical Gods' War Gigantic Formula (Japanese: 機神大戦 ギガンティック・フォーミュラ, Hepburn: Kishin Taisen Gigantikku Fōmyura), also known as Apo Mekhanes Theos Gigantic Formula, is a Japanese anime television series that aired on TV Tokyo from April 4, 2007, to September 26, 2007. A manga adaptation by Shōhei Oka was serialized concurrently in Dengeki Daioh.

== Overview ==
The series is set in the year 2035 A.D. After the excavation of Regions around the World 12 gigantic heads resembling the Greek Gods were uncovered. So far in the series the following countries/regions have been confirmed as having obtained one of the heads, Italy Roma Republic, Empire of North America, Central China, the Caribbean, Venezuela Republic, Original Greece, Great British Kingdom, France Union, East European Russia, Federated Egypt, Africa Arabia, Japan Republic, Unified German Deutsch, and Hindustania. Each of the heads give out powerful energy capable of destroying large areas. Shortly after the 12 heads excavation a large portion of Earth was engulfed in flames. The areas include most of North Africa, South America, and the entire Middle East, this phenomenon was called the "Equatorial Winter". For a time after the disaster the Nations of the world were unable to contact or get Satellite feed of each other due to a large wall of energy separating them.

Subsequently, after each of the countries hired translators, who can speak to the heads and translate for them. The heads tell the countries to, Build them armor to fight with. So the countries each built large steel mechs with the heads as the power source to fight against other countries, To unify the World, and begins WWW (World's Wisest War).

== Character histories and gigantic status ==
=== Japan Republic ===
- Japan Republic's X-Onyxs defeated Empire of North America's Jupiter-II.
- Japan Republic's Sxano-X (really no. 13) defeated Japan Republic's X-Onyxs (the original no. 10).

Shingo Suwa (州倭慎吾, Suwa Shingo)
Voiced by: Tsubasa Yonaga (Japanese); Billy Kametz (English)
The main protagonist, he is the pilot of Sxano-X, and is 13 years old.
Mana Kamishiro (神代真名, Kamishiro Mana)
Voiced by: Rina Satō (Japanese); Lizzie Freeman (English)
The female lead, a translator for Sxano-X. She is 14 years old.
Utsumi Amano (天野卯兎美, Amano Utsumi)
Voiced by: Sayuri Yahagi
The chief engineer for Sxano-X. She is a 10-year-old genius who likes to be called "Ucchie" (うっちぃ).
Katsumi Ohmi (大海華都美, Ōmi Katsumi)
Voiced by: Yuko Sasaki
She is the Commander for the army that involves Sxano-X, 32 years old.
Tsutomu Oda (皇田 力, Oda Tsutomu)
Voiced by: Kousuke Meguro
The Second in Command for the army that involves Sxano-X. He is 53 years old.

=== Central China ===
- Central China's Xuanwushan-III was defeated by Japan Republic's Sxano-X in their second battle.

Wen-Yee Lee (李 雲儀, Ri Wen'ī)
Voiced by: Tomokazu Seki
He was the pilot of Xuanwushan-III. After the defeat of Central China he became the trainer for Shingo and Mana. He is 24 years old, and is Chau-Yan's husband.
Chau-Yan Lee (李 走影, Ri Tsauyen)
Voiced by: Ryoka Yuzuki
She was the translator of Xuanwushan-III. After the defeat of Central China she became the trainer for Shingo and Mana. She is 21 years old, and is married to Wen-Yee.

=== East European Russia ===
- East European Russia was defeated by Japan Republic's Sxano-X in their third battle.

Sxano was able to endure the effects of Eunova's ultimate weapon "The Hundred eyes of Argos"

Sergei Kulakovskii (セルゲイ・クラコフスキー, Serugei Kurakofusukī)
Voiced by: Sachi Kokuryu
He is the pilot of Eunova-VIII, 15 years old. Later, when he and Tatyana are defeated by Japan's Republic, Sxano-X, he is a cheerful guy with a good attitude and is hard to hate. He becomes quick friends with the protagonists and worries about them. He seems to have a romantic relationship with Eunova's translator, and his partner, Tatyana, despite her being older.
Tatyana Grigoriev (タチアナ・グリゴリエフ, Tachiana Gurigoriefu)
Voiced by: Rei Sakuma
The translator of Eunova-VIII, 32 years old. She is shown as a sensible and mature woman and corrects Sergei often about being polite and what not. She seems to have a romantic relationship with Sergei, seen kissing in one episode.

=== Federated Egypt Africa Arabia ===
- Nephthys-IX lost to East European Russia's Eunova-VIII within a few minutes of encounter.

Mariam Al-Atrash (マリアム・アル・アトラシュ, Mariamu Aru Atorashu)
Voiced by: Hiromi Tsuru
The pilot of Nephthys-IX, 22 years old.
Isa Ali-Haddad (イーサー・アリー・ハッダード, Īsā Arī Haddādo)
Voiced by: Ryusei Nakao
Nephthys-IX's translator, 24 years old. He hated Mariam for a while thinking that she was a hypocrite, after going into battles with her, he realized she isn't a hypocrite at all.

=== Original Greece ===
- Cheiron-V was defeated and destroyed by Federated Egypt Africa Arabia's Nephthys-IX. Both the pilot and translator died during the battle.

Muhammad Dukakis (ムハンマド・デュカキス, Muhanmado Dyukakisu)
Voiced by: Nobuo Tobita
The pilot of Cheiron-V. He has a ring which it was intended to give to Christy, but never had the courage to do so. It seems that he doesn't get along with Hasan as well. He died during the battle with Federated Egypt Africa Arabia's Nephthys-IX, aged 23.
Hasan Papas (ハサン・パパス, Hasan Papasu)
Voiced by: Katsuyuki Konishi
The translator of Cheiron-V. He seems to have a crush on Christy as well, and does not get along with Muhammad very well. He died during the battle with Nephthys-IX, aged 22 years.
Christy Aurelian (クリスティ・アウレリアス, Kurisuti Aureriasu)
Voiced by: Houko Kuwashima
The chief engineer of Cheiron-V. Both Muhammad and Hasan likes her, but she's in love with someone else. She is 21 years old.

=== Great British Kingdom ===
- Griffine-VI was lost from the misfire (claimed by the UN) of Italy Roma Republic's Vulcanus-I and Unified German Deutsch's Minervas-XI's long range battle.

Cynthia Holbein (シンシア・ホルバイン, Shinshia Horubain)
Voiced by: Miki Nagasawa
She is the pilot of Griffine-VI, 20 years old. Initially he does not like Daniel because she thinks he's a criminal, but then later she got along with him.
Daniel Peterson (ダニエル・ピーターソン, Danieru Pītāson)
Voiced by: Kinryū Arimoto
The translator of Griffine-VI, 51 years old. He was a butler for a British royal, then his master assassinated his wife and framed him to be the killer. He stayed in jail until he was called to be the translator of Griffine-VI.

=== France Union ===
- Diane-VII was lost from the misfire (claimed by the UN) of Italy Roma Republic's Vulcanus-I and Unified German Deutsch's Minervas-XI's long range battle.

Olivier Mirabeau (オリヴィエ・ミラボー, Orivie Mirabō)
Voiced by: Kishō Taniyama
The pilot of Diane-VII, 19 years old. He is the step brother of Sylvie, and cares about her very much. It seems that they are romantically in love instead of brother-sister love.
Sylvie Mirabeau (シルヴィア・ミラボー, Shiruvia Mirabō)
Voiced by: Kaori Nazuka
She serves as Diane-VII's translator, 16 years old. Initially she hated her step brother because she thinks his mom stole her dad away from her, then realized he cares about her a lot. It seems that they are romantically in love instead of brother-sister love.

=== Italy Roma Republic ===
- Vulcanus-I lost the long range battle against Unified German Deutsch's Minervas-XI.

Leone Trussardi (レオーネ・トラサルディ, Reōne Torasarudi)
The pilot of Vulcanus-I, 11 years old. He is an orphan, but very energetic. He uses the money paid by the military to buy food for the poor. He and Lucrezia were tricked by the military to fire missiles at the place where Diane-VII and Griffine-VI had their battle.
Lucrezia Moretti (ルクレツィア・モレッティ, Rukuretsia Moretti)
Voiced by: Yōko Sōmi
The translator of Vulcanus-I, 23 years old. She is treated as a saint, and is admired by many people. She was a prostitute after the Equatorial Winter had occurred to survive. She and Leone were tricked by the military to fire missiles at the place where Diane-VII and Griffine-VI had their battle.

Appendix: Though the show leaves you thinking these two die in their battle with Minervas, they are shown in the last episode.

=== Unified German Deutsch ===
- Minervas-XI lost the battle against Empire of North America's Jupiter-II.

Eleonore Klein (エレオノーレ・クライン, Ereonōre Kurain)
Voiced by: Rie Kugimiya
Minervas-XI's pilot, 15 years old. She looks younger than she actually is. She is always cheerful and cares about Michael deeply, so much that she'd sacrifice herself to protect him. She is the one who finally defeats Vulcanus-I with their cannon, to protect Michael but before doing so she repeatedly says, "it's so sad..." and finally, "it's so sad...but I have to protect Michael." It is shown that she too has a code for child prodigies, and it isn't clear whether or not she is one or that she was a failed prodigy.
Michael Schmidt (ミハイル・シュミット, Mihairu Shumitto)
Voiced by: Yuki Kaida
Minervas-XI's translator, 12 years old. He's a child prodigy like Utsumi Amano. He is an overconfident young boy who believes he is better than normal people due to him being a born prodigy. He seems to not like Elenore due to her innocence and naivety, however, shows that he truly cares for her when she protects him from Vulcanus-I. He vows that he'd protect her, whom he now says is his most precious person. When they are battling against Jupiter-II, he and Elenore are abandoned by their team and left for dead, his top objective then was to save Elenore. They lose quickly, Minervas-XI was destroyed but they were saved and are seen huddled together with a blanket over them.

=== Empire of North America ===
- Jupiter-II lost the battle against Japan's X-Onyxs.

Zion Aldridge (ザイオン・オルドリッジ, Zaion Orudorijji)
Voiced by: Tesshō Genda
The pilot of Jupiter-II, 45 years old. He's in the military.
Ray Aldridge (レイ・オルドリッジ, Rei Orudorijji)
Voiced by: Maya Okamoto
The translator of Jupiter-II, 14 years old. She is Zion's daughter.

=== Caribbean Venezuela Republic ===
- Ceres-IV lost the battle against Hindustania's Isthar-XII.

Evita Lambert (エヴィータ・ランベルト, Evīta Ranberuto)
Voiced by: Ami Koshimizu
Ceres-IV's pilot. She is 17 years old, and is Amalia's daughter.
Amalia Lambert (アマリア・ランベルト, Amaria Ranberuto)
Voiced by: Masako Katsuki
The translator of Ceres-IV. She is 35 years old.

=== Hindustania ===
- Isthar-XII lost the battle against East European Russia's Eunova-VIII.

Lily Luna (リリィ・ルーナ, Ririi Rūna)
Voiced by: Kikuko Inoue
The pilot of Isthar-XII, 20 years old. She first appeared in episode one, and is a fortune teller.
Raveena Khan (ラヴィーナ・カーン, Ravīna Kān)
Voiced by: Minami Takayama
The translator of Isthar-XII, 21 years old. She is a researcher on the OXII. She is against Lily in theoretical ways.

== Gigantics ==
The countries and their mechas are:

Country:	Unified Nations	Italy Roma Republic	Empire of North America	Central China	Caribbean Venezuela Republic	Original Greece	Great British Kingdom	France Union	East European Russia	Federated Egypt Africa Arabia	Japan Republic	Unified German Deutsch	Hindustania	Japan Republic
Mecha:	Kronos-0	Vulcanus-I	Jupiter-II	Xuanwushan-III	Ceres-IV	Cheiron-V	Griffine-VI	Diane-VII	Eunova-VIII	Nephthys-IX	Sxano-X (XIII)	Minervas-XI	Isthar-XII	X-Onyxs
Registration:	N/A	GF-IRR-I	GF-ENA-II	GF-CCh-III	GF-CVR-IV	GF-OrG-V	GF-GBK-VI	GF-FrU-VII	GF-EER-VIII	GF-FEAA-IX	GF-JAR-X	GF-UGD-XI	GF-HIN-XII	GF-JAR-X
OXII:	N/A	Hephaestus	Zeus	Hermes / Mercurius	Demeter	Poseidon	Apollon	Artemis	Hera	Hestia	Ares	Athena	Aphrodite	Zeus Copy
Power:	N/A	4	10	5	4	8	8	5	7	7	5	7	4	?
Attack:	N/A	8	10	4	6	8	7	7	7	9	6	9	3	?
Defense:	N/A	6	10	3	4	8	8	3	3	4	6	7	2	?
Speed:	N/A	6	4	9	4	8 (Underwater)	3	6	6	5	6	3	6	?
Pilot:	N/A	Leone Trussardi	Zion Aldridge	Wen-Yee Lee	Evita Lambert	Muhammad Dukakis (Deceased)	Cynthia Holbein	Olivier Mirabeau	Sergei Kulakovskii	Mariam Al-Atrash	Shingo Suwa	Eleonore Klein	Lily Luna	Masahito Ōguro
Translator:	N/A	Lucrezia Moretti	Ray Aldridge	Chau-Yan Lee	Amalia Lambert	Hasan Papas (Deceased)	Daniel Peterson	Sylvie Mirabeau	Tatyana Grigoriev	Isa Ali-Haddad	Mana Kamishiro	Michael Schmidt	Raveena Khan	Kana Kamishiro

== Staff ==
The show is produced by Bandai Visual and TV Tokyo with anime production by Brains Base. The show has been broadcast by: AT-X (2007-05-30); TV Aichi (2007-04-05); TV Hokkaido (2007-04-17); TV Osaka (2007-04-11); TV Setouchi (2007-04-11); TV Tokyo (2007-04-04); and TVQ Kyushu Broadcasting Co., Ltd. (2007-04-10).

Director: Keiji Gotoh; Screenplay: Hidefumi Kimura
