= Generator Gawl =

Japanese anime television series

- US DVD cover. Clockwise from top: Ryo, Gawl and Koji

ジェネレイター ガウル (Jenereitā Gauru)
- Anime television series
- Directed by: Seiji Mizushima
- Produced by: Hiroyuki Birukawa; Shoichi Yoshida
- Written by: Hidefumi Kimura; Fumihiko Shimo
- Music by: Norimasa Yamanaka
- Studio: Tatsunoko Production
- Licensed by: NA: ADV Films (expired)
- Original network: TXN (TV Tokyo)
- English network: KTEH/KCAH; Anime Network
- Original run: 6 October 1998 – 22 December 1998
- Episodes: 12

Generator Gawl (ジェネレイター ガウル, Jenereitā Gauru) is a 1998 12-episode anime television series produced by Tatsunoko Production and the Victor Company of Japan (JVC, now JVCKenwood).

== Plot ==
The story is set in 2007, when Professor Takuma Nekasa uncovers a gene code that will unlock the human body's greatest mystery and expose mankind to its greatest threat. As a result, Gawl, Koji, and Ryo—three young scientists from a future period—have time traveled to the past to undo this mistake. Though the trio intended to arrive one year before the calamity, they are instead transported three months prior to the event. In their effort to save the world, they are opposed by the mysterious and cunning Ryuko Saito, a scientist who prefers the future as it is. Saito is assisted by Generators, unearthly assassins posing as humans. As Ryo and Koji try to complete their mission, Gawl himself must "generate"—becoming like his enemies to fight on their terms.

== Characters ==
Gawl Kudo
Nobutoshi Canna (Japanese), Vic Mignogna (English)

The hero and main character of the story, Gawl is a Generator with vast power. Though he appears somewhat dim-witted, Gawl shows loyalty and protectiveness for his friends, even if it means putting his life on the line. Even when out of his Generator form Gawl is able to display superhuman feats of athletics, strength, and endurance, such as jumping several meters in the air, and surviving an otherwise crushing blow from falling construction equipment. Despite this, he appears to be very lax and lazy, as he is almost always asleep during classes and car rides, as his transformations and brawls tend to be highly taxing, thus requiring large amounts of sleep and relaxation to compensate. This also implies that he is not as dim-witted as he lets on.

Koji Suzuki
Shin-ichiro Miki (Japanese), Jay Hickman (English)

Koji is the level-headed one of the trio and a true intellectual. He rarely displays much emotion at all and only laughs one time in the series.

Ryo
Tsutomu Kashiwakura (Japanese), Matt Kelley (English)

Ryo is the more sensitive of the three, but he is also quite brilliant. He was head of Kubere's Project Achilles to create Gawl and feels intense guilt for his experiments on Gawl.

Masami Shippō
Satsuki Yukino (Japanese), Rozie Curtis (English)

A girl who met up with the three early on in the series. Masami constantly fights with Gawl due to a poor first impression. Though this may be, it is quite obvious that she has somewhat of a romantic interest in him.

Natsume Chigira
Konami Yoshida (Japanese), Monica Rial (English)

A pink-haired girl who is extremely shy and Masami's best friend. She constantly attempts to calm Gawl and Masami down when they get in a heated conflict but never succeeds.

Ryuko Saito
Yuriko Yamaguchi (Japanese), Kaytha Coker (English)

The antagonist of the story, Saito is a mysterious scientist and time-traveler who attempts to thwart Gawl, Koji, and Ryo. She uses Dr. Tekuma Nekasa's desire to recover his past to bend him to her will. She is constantly calling Generators to do her dirty work and often tries to kill or capture Gawl and his friends.

Takuma Nekasa
Yoku Shioya (Japanese), John Swasey (English)

A professor that uncovers a gene code that will unlock our body's greatest mystery and expose mankind to its greatest threat.

Kanae
Hideyuki Hori (Japanese), Jason Douglas (English)

A scientist and Ryuko Saito's assistant.

== Generators ==
Generator
A being with the ability to transform into a metalloid (metallic/organic) warrior with powers far beyond those of humans. There are many types of Generator, such as Gawl ("Razor?"), Cyclops, Manta, and many more. All of which have their own abilities that were either designed for weaponry or for the Reconstruction when they were "officially" introduced. There are also multiple "phases" of Generator, which refers to the power output of a Generator and the stage of development, Gawl likely being Phase 4 and Ryuko Saito being a Phase 5.

There is also a "Control" level to Generators. The First level is completely based on hardwired connections; the Second and Third are semi-autonomous levels with preset commands which the subject is free to use in whatever parameters that are set. Third-level generators, however, are capable of reverting to human form. The Fourth level is where the subject is completely self-aware, capable of full physical control and is able to revert to human form, but is not capable of vocal communication; for example, in the series Gawl's generated form is unable to speak (can only grunt expressions and perhaps yell/scream). The Fifth and final level is where the generator has complete control, can fully communicate, and is capable of using its immense power in any way.

Exogenerate
Also known in the American dub as "generate," this is the ability to transform into Generator Form through the mental trigger of activating the transformation gene. Surprisingly, in one of the later episodes, Koji and Ryo generate; they, however, are less powerful than Gawl, being Phase 1. This is because they activated their Include Cells as they are, not like Gawl who was activated before he was born. According to Gawl after an individual's first time generating their body will undergo certain changes, although these changes are never explained in detail.

Core
The heart of a Generator, all relays of power and life functions are processed in here. The core is crystalline in hardness and can only be destroyed by another Generator. Once it is shattered, the Generator dies and turns into either energy or dust. It is often exposed on the chest, but in certain designs, such as Sound and Cyclops, it may be hidden within the body (Sound) or exposed on the back (Cyclops).

It is revealed later in the series that Natsume is working for Ryuko, and knew who and what Gawl, Koji, and Ryo were since she first saw Generator Gawl and the Sound type outside the fast-food restaurant Masami works at. She is used as a spy to track them and, in one episode, used as a human bomb. However, at this point Natsumi rebels and leaves a recorded message for the trio and Masami and goes off into the forest so that the bomb inside her body won't destroy the others.

Koji and Ryo are Phase 1 Generators who aren't as powerful as Gawl.

It is known that Koji, Ryo, and Gawl were grown either by in-vitro fertilization or in some form of growth tube. Either way, it is fact that their genetic mother is Natsume, as evidenced later in the series when Ryuko's assistant, who is in fact an older Koji, notices the ID numbers for eggs that Ryuko removed from Natsume shortly before the suicide mission. The ID numbers directly coincided with Gawl, Ryo and Koji's IDs back in their own time, which identify who they were cloned from.

Professor Tekuma Nekasa is Ryo. At the end of the series, Gawl and the others confront Ryuko, only for her to rip out Gawl's core. As a result, two things happen. First is that Ryo and Koji are thrown backwards in time, with Ryo losing his memories of everything except the include cells that allow exogeneration. The second is Gawl speaking to an image of Natsume in his head, and using his desires to control the temporal energies and successfully stop Ryuko's plans by "recreating the world." However, he was unable to bring Natsume back.

Natsume's death drove Gawl into a blind rage, triggering a Rage form. Rage Gawl stands 3 meters tall (according to an on-scene news reporter, however he appears much larger, likely around ten to fifteen meters) and makes quick work out of all others but not without injuries, except Generator Ryuko, who makes quick work out of the now-weakened Gawl.
