= Kiddy Grade =

Japanese anime television series

- Éclair (left) and Lumière with Donnerschlag, LaMuse, and Planet Aineias in the background.

キディ・グレイド (Kidi Gureido)
- Genre: Action; Science fiction; Space opera
- Created by: gímik Gonzo
- Light novel

Kiddy Grade Pr. ("Pre-story")
- Written by: Tomohiko Aoki
- Illustrated by: Hidefumi Kimura
- Published by: Kadokawa Shoten
- Imprint: Kadokawa Sneaker Bunko
- Original run: September 1, 2001 – February 1, 2002
- Volumes: 2
- Anime television series
- Directed by: Keiji Gotoh
- Written by: Hidefumi Kimura
- Music by: Shirō Hamaguchi
- Studio: Gonzo
- Licensed by: Crunchyroll (Note: In North America through Crunchyroll, LLC (formerly known as Funimation).); AUS: Madman Entertainment; UK: MVM Films
- Original network: Fuji TV, KTV
- English network: US: Funimation Channel; ZA: Animax
- Original run: October 8, 2002 – March 18, 2003
- Episodes: 24
- Manga

Kiddy Grade Reverse
- Written by: HIYOHIYO
- Published by: Kadokawa Shoten
- Magazine: Shōnen Ace
- Published: March 1, 2003
- Manga

Kiddy Grade Versus
- Written by: Hidefumi Kimura
- Illustrated by: Arikui Fujimaru
- Published by: Kadokawa Shoten
- Magazine: Dragon Jr.
- Original run: March 1, 2003 – November 1, 2003
- Volumes: 2
- Light novel
- Written by: Fumihiko Shimo
- Illustrated by: Hidefumi Kimura
- Published by: Kadokawa Shoten
- Imprint: Kadokawa Sneaker Bunko
- Original run: November 1, 2002 – September 1, 2003
- Volumes: 3
- Light novel

Kiddy Grade EX-Partner ("Extra story")
- Written by: Hidefumi Kimura
- Illustrated by: Megumi Kadonosono
- Published by: Kadokawa Shoten
- Published: September 25, 2003
- Light novel

Kiddy Grade Secret Affair
- Written by: Hidefumi Kimura
- Illustrated by: Megumi Kadonosono
- Published by: Kadokawa Shoten
- Published: January 29, 2004
- Anime film

Kiddy Grade -Ignition-
- Directed by: Keiji Gotoh
- Studio: Gonzo
- Released: April 7, 2007
- Runtime: 90 minutes
- Anime film

Kiddy Grade -Maelstrom-
- Directed by: Keiji Gotoh
- Studio: Gonzo
- Released: June 23, 2007
- Runtime: 90 minutes
- Anime film

Kiddy Grade -Truth Dawn-
- Directed by: Keiji Gotoh
- Studio: Gonzo
- Released: September 1, 2007
- Runtime: 90 minutes

Kiddy Grade (Japanese: キディ・グレイド, romanized: Kidi Gureido) is a Japanese anime television series produced in 2002 and created by gímik and Gonzo Digimation and directed by Keiji Gotoh. The series is licensed and distributed in North America by FUNimation Entertainment.

In October 2006, news of a Kiddy Grade sequel was announced, under the working title of Kiddy Grade 2 (キディ・グレイ) (K-G.2), to be animated by Asread (Shuffle! anime). On February 26, 2009, it was re-announced under the new title Kiddy Girl-and (キディ・ガーランド, Kidi Gārando) along with news of a new manga adaptation, Kiddy Girl-and Pure (キディ・ガーランド ぴゅあ, Kidi Gārando Pyua). The sequel is set 50 years after the original series and introduces two new female protagonists, Ascœur (アスクール, Asukūru) and Q-feuille (ク・フィーユ, Ku Fīyu).

== Overview ==
=== Story and setting ===
Kiddy Grade takes place in a future where the human race has expanded and inhabits a multitude of planets in the universe with fantastic technology. Unsurprisingly, crime has grown alongside technology, and thus the Galactic Organization of Trade and Tariffs (GOTT, German for "God") is formed as a sort of universal police force. Within this organization, there is a special (and secret) branch known as the ES Force (ES standing for "Encounter of Shadow-work"), consisting of twelve physically young people who possess amazing superpowers. Each ES member operates with another as a team, and the series' focus is a team of two low-level members, Éclair and Lumière. As the series progresses, they start to see the darker side of GOTT and its secrets.

=== Characters ===
- Éclair (Voiced by: Ryōko Nagata is a member of GOTT (Galactic Organization of Trade and Tariffs) who aims to incorporate beings sent on missions as an ES member of the so-called "Shadow Unit" to ensure normal economic operation on the various planets around the Galaxy. She does this with the assistance of her younger partner and fellow receptionist, Lumière. Known for her childish nature, Éclair often dresses up in either a skimpy or amusing, as well as shouting "Ta-da!"じゃっじゃ～ん！ (Jajjan!) whenever she arrives on the scene to arrest someone or instances when she surprises or saves Lumière.
- Lumière (Voiced by: Aya Hirano) is a GOTT receptionist and ES member like her partner, Éclair. She has little to no physical abilities, but instead makes up for this with her controlled mind, wit, and ability to control any computer unit. Although Lumière is physically younger than Éclair, she is far more mature from the way she dresses, her politeness, and her tastes. Lumière is trying to convince Éclair to be more lady-like through her catchphrase, "A lady should be more elegant". She is often the person who sits at the side during missions.
- Armbrust (Voiced by: Gou Aoba) is the 36-year-old auditor for the Global Union who is sent to observe Éclair and Lumière on their missions throughout the series. Calm and collected, he is somewhat of a ladies' man. Armbrust is frequently the target of Éclair's distrust despite his efforts and good intentions. Unlike her partner, Lumière frequently comes to his defense. Armbrust is mis-translated as Armblast in the English dub, but her name is spelled correctly in the English-subtitled version.
- Eclipse (Voiced by: Mika Doi) is the Chief of Galactic Organization of Trade and Tariffs (GOTT). She aims to make sure normal economic activities on all planets in the Galaxy to an extent under the guise of the Galactic Union. Eclipse is admired by Éclair. She rarely speaks her mind and never says anything wrong. Her other catchphrase is "Éclair, Lumière, arrest authorization granted".
- Mercredi (Voiced by: Kaori Mizuhashi) is the 13-year-old private secretary of Eclipse who is considered the "right-hand girl". She is talented at data gathering and her abilities almost rival a computer.

==== Other ES members ====
- Alv (Voiced by: Kikuko Inoue) is an ES member of the GOTT. She works with her partner, Dvergr, to make sure normal economic activity in the Galaxy. Alv is the more open of the duo, but disliked by most ES members, specifically Tweedledee and Éclair. As an S Class ES Member, she is particularly powerful. Alv claims she works for herself, but is willing to play the pawn when it suits her needs.
- Dvergr (Voiced by: Omi Minami) is Alv's partner. She seems to be more level-headed than her counterpart and does not partake in Alv teasing ther other ES members.
- Tweedledee (Voiced by: Natsuko Kuwatani) is Tweedledum's partner and twin sister. She has a commanding presence and values loyalty above all else. Tweedledee often scolds her brother for calling her "sister" while on duty and has a strong sense of pride.
- Tweedledum (Voiced by: Jun Fukuyama) is Tweedledee's partner and twin brother who is loyal to his sister. However, he is not sociable with anyone else other than Tweedledee. Due to their strong bond, Tweedledum gets jealous when his sister shows interest in Lumière.
- Viola is Cesario's partner who is a member of GOTT ES Member (C Class). She is the main voice of her partnership with Cesario. Viola enjoys Italian food and argues with Cesario about where to eat.
- Cesario (Voiced by: Toshiyuki Morikawa) is Viola's partner who is a GOTT ES Member (C Class). Normally a silent person, he is usually seen communicating to Viola by whispering in her ear, preferring to do so with body language instead of voice.
- Un-ou is A-ou's partner who is a GOTT ES Member (S Class). Cynical and impulsive, he enjoys the danger that comes with his job. The duo were formerly mercenaries who were constantly at odds with Éclair and Lumière.
- A-ou (Voiced by: Tetsu Inada) is a Un-ou's partner who is GOTT ES Member (S Class) partner. The older and more stoic member of the Duo, he a strong sense of honor and justice. A-ou is also more of a pacifist and he often speaks in a profound and meaningful manner, giving him a rather preachy presence among other people.
- Sinistra (Voiced by: Nobuo Tobita) is Dextera's partner who is a GOTT ES Member. He seems to be the silent type, but is a sociable person. Whenever Sinist They each unleash an energy burst that is the same color as their hair.
- Dextera (Voiced by: Hirotaka Suzuoki) is Sinistra's partner who is a GOTT ES Member (S Class). He has a reputation for being the victor of numerous battles in the past with the characteristics of strong leadership characteristics.

==== Minor characters ====
- Liquide "Liquiy" Cole is a GOTT receptionist who works (and is friends) with Éclair and Lumière at the front gate of GOTT Headquarters. She often hangs out with Éclair outside of work and is there for her whenever she needs help.
- Bonita Gerard is another GOTT receptionist who works with Liquiy, Éclair and Lumière.
- Caprice is a friend of Éclair who works as a waitress at Fleur's Cafe. Not seen very often during the series, but it is implied that they have also maintained a long relationship.
- Mrs. Padushka is another friend of Éclair and an SO member of GOTT. She is shown to be very nervous. She retires from the GOTT in order to devote her time to family life with her husband, Gluck. Padushka also gave birth to a baby girl named after Éclair, but never learned about Éclair being an ES member until she left GOTT.
- Chevalier d'Autriche, at 56, is the Secretary General of the GOTT and head of the GU Economic Dept. Despite the fact that he's a Nouvlesse, Chevalier is a key figure to Éclair's past and her forgotten former lives. In his lifetime, he has never forgotten Éclair and is always willing to help her. He worked his way up to his current position all for Éclair's sake.
- Vendredi is a GOTT SO member who replaces Mercredi as Eclipse's secretary later in the series. She wears the same uniform and wig as Mercredi, so Vendredi looks very similar to her predecessor.
- Franz is a young doctor who helped Éclair recover from an injury many decades ago when they were help fighting a civil war on a space outpost. It is hinted that Franz and Éclair showed mutual interests in each other but since he was a human it would've never worked out. Although he promised Éclair and Lumière that he would always be there to help them no matter how many years passed. Hence he built a secret underground medical facility in his hospital, hoping that they will be able to find it many years later.

== Media ==
=== Anime ===
Kiddy Grade originally aired on Fuji Television in Japan from October 8, 2002 – March 18, 2003. The series ran for 24 episodes and was produced by Gonzo. The series currently airs on the FUNimation Channel in both its "syndicated block" and its 24-hour channel. In 2007, the series was re-released as three movies (each 80–90 minutes in length) to specific Japanese theatres. The following are the individual titles for each film and their release dates.

1. Ignition (initial screening April 8, 2007, DVD released July 27, 2007)
2. Maelstrom (initial screening June 23, 2007, DVD released September 28, 2007)
3. Truth Dawn (initial screening September 1, 2007, DVD released December 21, 2007)

==== Crew ====
- Keiji Gotoh – Director
- Hidefumi Kimura – Scenario
- Megumi Kadonosono – Character design
- Shirō Hamaguchi – Composer

==== Theme songs ====
- Opening
1. "Memories of the Future" (Mirai no Kioku) by Yuka
- Ending
1. "Future" by Little Viking

=== Print media ===
The Kiddy Grade franchise started right in the form of a series of light novels, published by Kadokawa Shoten under the label of Kadokawa Sneaker Bunko from 1 September 2001 to 1 February 2002 and later collected into two volumes (Kiddy Grade Pr1, September 1, 2001, and Kiddy Grade Pr2, February 1, 2002). Following are other light novel dedicated to the characters of the series were published: Kiddy Grade, 3 volumes published from 1 November 2002 to 1 September 2003; Kiddy Grade EX-Partner, single volume published September 25, 2003; and finally Kiddy Grade Secret Affair, single volume published January 29, 2004.

The series was adapted into two manga series. The first, Kiddy Grade Reverse was made by Hiyohiyo and published in the magazine Shonen Ace of Kadokawa Shoten, before being collected in a single volume published on 1 March 2003. The second series, Kiddy Grade Versus was made by Hidefumi Kimura and Arikui Fujimaru and published in the magazine Dragon Jr Kadokawa Shoten, before being collected in two volumes published February 27, 2003 (the first volume) and 1 November 2003 ( the second volume).

== Reception ==
The reviewer at THEM Anime Reviews awarded it 3 stars out of 5, calling it entertaining and "pretty decent" show hampered by a convoluted plot.. The show was reviewed three times for Anime News Network, where the reviewers awarded the show a B score, noting that the show gets stronger in the latter arc, having unfortunately "suffered from the uninspired earlier episodes". ANN reviews also highlighted "likable central characters, interesting premises, sharp artwork", as well as inconsistent writing, which the reviewers see ranging from "A" to "D", depending on the particular arc.

Piotr Konieczny writing for The Encyclopedia of Science Fiction, described the show as exemplifying early-2000s Japanese space opera anime, with "glamorous heroines, flashy visuals, corporate conspiracies, and tonal instability between comedy and melodrama". The entry notes that early episodes present lighthearted, action-packed "girls-with-guns" adventures resembling Dirty Pair, but the story becomes more serious in the second half. According to SFE, the original series from 2002 remains the most respected and well-known instalment. It suffers from uneven structure – the main plot emerges late – and the heavy use of fan service (gratuitous sexualization of female characters; in particular, Éclair), but critics have generally praised the story's inventive twists and energetic climax. However, the 2009 continuation was more poorly received; the entry calls it "a poorly executed clone of the original series" and notes that it illustrate how Japanese sf franchises of the era often softened into parody and moe tropes when trying (not very successfully) to attract new audiences.

== See also ==
- Muses in popular culture
