= Legend of Himiko =

Japanese media franchise

火魅子伝 (Himiko-Den)
- Genre: Adventure; Historical fantasy
- Video game
- Developer: Hakuhodo
- Platform: PlayStation
- Released: March 11, 1999
- Anime television series
- Directed by: Ami Tomobuki
- Produced by: Kenichirō Zaizen; Takao Minegishi; Akira Kakei
- Written by: Sanshirō Kuramoto; Masumi Hirayanagi
- Music by: Kuniaki Haishima
- Studio: Group TAC
- Original network: TV Tokyo
- Original run: January 7, 1999 – March 31, 1999
- Episodes: 12
- Manga
- Written by: Kō Maisaka
- Illustrated by: Ito Ōgure
- Published by: Kadokawa Shoten
- Imprint: Dragon Comics
- Magazine: Comic Dragon
- Published: 1999
- Volumes: 1
- Novel

Legend of Himiko (火魅子伝, Himiko-Den) is a Japanese media franchise, consisting of an anime television series, a manga series, a novel series, and a PlayStation game. All four were released in early 1999.

The PlayStation game was created by Hakuhodo and was released in Japan on March 11, 1999. The manga is a single volume series written by Kō Maisaka and illustrated by Oh! great and released in Japan by Kadokawa Shoten in early 1999. It has been licensed in France by Panini Comics and Germany by Planet Manga.

The 12 episode television series aired on TV Tokyo between January 7, 1999, and March 31, 1999. It was released in Japan by Group TAC. The anime has been released in the US in a 3-disc release by Central Park Media. The anime is technically based on the PlayStation game, even though the anime started airing before the game was officially released.

== Plot ==
The Legend of Himiko is probably based on an ancient Japanese tale told in the Chinese history book Sanguo Zhi. The nation of Yamatai is under threat from the overseas kingdom of Kune (probably based on the nation of Kunekoku). In an attempt to stave off an invasion, the people of Yamatai attempt to install a Queen to rule over their kingdom, which is to be chosen by the mysterious Bokka.

However, the Kune army attacks Yamatai before the selection of the Queen can be completed, and the Bokka disperse the six queen candidates across the nation. The Bokka themselves take shelter in a newborn girl named Himiko and the pendant she is wearing and transport her to modern times, where she is found by Masahiko Kutani.

Several years in the future, Himiko and Kutani attend high school together. When the two are wandering around an archeological dig, Himiko's pendant activates, sending both back into ancient Japan where they are found by Imari, one of the queen candidates, and Iga within Kune's place in Yamatai, three years after Kune's initial attack.

Both Himiko and Kutani learn about the Bokka and what relationship they have with it. The six queen candidates also finally all join back together, for the first time since they were dispersed when Kune first attacked. They eventually fight against Shikara, the governor-general of Yamatai and the son of the king of Kune, in order to free Yamatai from Kune's rule.

== List of episodes ==
1. The Sacred Fire
2. The Fountain of Darkness
3. Jaki, The Night Chasers
4. The Hideaway Village
5. Heavenly Spirit
6. The Pendant
7. The Seiseito Metropolis
8. The Albatross
9. The Burning Fortress
10. Guardians of Fire
11. Biwa Island
12. Sword of Seven Blades
