= Kiddy Girl-and =

Japanese anime television series

- Kiddy Girl-And
- Volume 12 DVD cover, featuring Q-feuille and Ascoeur

キディ・ガーランド (Kidi Gārando)
- Genre: Adventure, comedy, science fiction
- Created by: Gímik
- Manga

KIDDY GiRL-AND Pure
- Written by: Hidefumi Kimura
- Illustrated by: Yukari Higa
- Published by: Kadokawa Shoten
- Magazine: Comp Ace
- Original run: 26 March 2009 – 26 April 2010
- Volumes: 2
- Anime television series
- Directed by: Keiji Gotoh
- Written by: Hidefumi Kimura
- Music by: Noriyasu Agematsu
- Studio: Satelight
- Licensed by: NA: Funimation
- Original network: SUN, TVS, Tokyo MX, tvk, KBS, HTV, CTC, Sendai TV, CTV
- Original run: 15 October 2009 – 25 March 2010
- Episodes: 24

Kiddy Girl-And (Japanese: キディ・ガーランド, Hepburn: Kidi Gārando) is a 2009 Japanese anime television series. It is a sequel to the anime series Kiddy Grade, created by gímik and Satelight and directed by Keiji Gotoh. The manga adaptation Kiddy Girl-and Pure (キディ・ガーランド ぴゅあ, Kidi Gārando Pyua), illustrated by Yukari Higa, ran in Comp Ace and was released into two collected volumes.

== Plot ==
Twenty-five years after Éclair and Lumière, (from the flagship Kiddy Grade series), rescued the galaxy from destruction's doorstep, the GTO (Galactic Trade Organization), created after the defeat of the GOTT (Galactic Organization of Trade and Tariffs), act on behalf of universal peace by combating criminal activity. Their special ES division mirrored after the GOTT's ES (Encounter of Shadow-work) force, now includes publicly acknowledged ES member candidates. The series follows three such trainees, Ascoeur, Q-feuille, and Di-air as they work their way to ES membership.

== Broadcast ==
In October 2006 news of a Kiddy Grade sequel was announced, under the working title of Kiddy Grade 2 (キディ・グレイ) (K-G.2), to be animated by asread (Shuffle! anime). A DVD containing a 7-minute preview of the new series was released on 2007-05-25 but nothing further was heard until, on February 26, 2009, it was re-announced under the new title Kiddy Girl-and (キディ・ガーランド, Kidi Gārando) along with news of a new manga adaptation, Kiddy Girl-and Pure (キディ・ガーランド ぴゅあ, Kidi Gārando Pyua).

The anime aired from autumn of 2009 until spring of 2010, and was produced by studio Satelight, based on a story by gímik. Set 50 years after the original series, Kiddy Girl-and introduced two new female protagonists, Ascœur (アスクール, Asukūru) and Q-feuille (ク・フィーユ, Ku Fīyu). The manga version, with story by Hidefumi Kimura and art by Yukari Higa (Shina Dark), is being serialized in the magazine Comp Ace, starting March 26, 2009.

Funimation announced during their Otakon 2017 panel that they have licensed the anime for a North American release.

== Reception ==
The review at Anime News Network assessed it as C+, noting that it "isn't a bad series; it just fails to do much to distinguish itself, and as a result stands as a pale follow-up to the original".

In The Encyclopedia of Science Fiction, the 2009 continuation of Kiddy Grade was poorly received; the entry calls it "a poorly executed clone of the original series" and notes that it illustrate how Japanese sf franchises of the era often softened into parody and moe tropes when trying (not very successfully) to attract new audiences..
