= List of Oku-sama wa Mahō Shōjo: Bewitched Agnes episodes =

Oku-sama wa Mahō Shōjo: Bewitched Agnes was produced by Media Factory, Toshiba Entertainment, J.C.Staff, Tram and Kids Station. It is directed by Hiroshi Nishikiori, with Yūji Matsukura, Kazuhiko Ikeguchi and Nishikiori himself handling series composition, Shinya Hasegawa designing the characters, Kenji Kondō and Takerō Sekijima composing the music and Chikako Shibata in charge of art direction. The opening theme is "Home & Away" (ホーム&アウェイ) by Melocure and the ending theme is "Jewelry" by Kikuko Inoue. The series was initially broadcast in Japan in thirteen episodes between 4 July 2005 and 25 September 2005 on several television channels: Chiba TV, Kids Station, Sun TV, TV Aichi, TV Kanagawa, and TV Saitama.

== Episode list ==
No.	Title	Directed by	Written by	Original release date
1	"No Kiss, You See"; Transliteration: "Kiss wa Dame yo, to Iu Koto" (Japanese: kissはダメよ、ということ)	Hiroshi Nishikiori	Akira Okeya	3 July 2005
The viewer meets Ureshiko Asaba, who is currently cleaning a room in the boarding house where she is staying, because a new tenant is on the way. In order to make the job go more quickly, Ureshiko tries to use her magic power, only to overdo it and make a mess. Later that day, a new girl transfers into the local middle school for the summer term. After classes end, she reveals that she also possesses magic power, and begins to transform the school into one she finds more attractive. Before she can complete the job, Ureshiko in the form of Agnes Bell reverts the school. The second girl identifies herself as Cruje, the next Manager of the Wonderland, and demands that Agnes hand over the Managerial Ring, but Agnes immediately refuses. About this time, Tatsumi Kagura and Yuuko Ayase are driving through the town on their way to the boarding house—Tatsumi is to be the new tenant. The pair almost get into an accident, but they are saved by Agnes's magic. Tatsumi and Yuuko then continue on to the boarding house, only to find that the assistant manager looks just like the woman who saved them. Later that evening, Ureshiko offers to help Tatsumi put away his things, but ends up falling on top of him. The two almost kiss, but Ureshiko eventually pushes Tatsumi away, saying, "No kiss, you see."
2	"Stew is Okay, You See"; Transliteration: "Shichū wa OK yo, to Iu Koto" (Japanese: シチューはOKよ、ということ)	Kiyotaka Ōhata	Akira Okeya	10 July 2005
Nori and Ururu are introduced as Ureshiko's childhood friends, who tell her to fight Cruje to protect the Wonderland. Tatsumi begins his work at a publishing company, and starts his first assignment—to secure the rights to local author Tamotsu Asaba's new book. Sayaka is followed home by some of her classmates. On the way, she uses her magic to send the others sliding down an enormous sand dune, but they are saved by Ureshiko at the last minute. Tatsumi encounters both Sayaka and Ureshiko, and invites the younger girl to dinner. Ureshiko tries to show Sayaka her vision of the Wonderland via a metaphor involving slowly cooking all of the ingredients in a stew and letting them simmer over time, but Sayaka believes that it is easier just to use magic. When the stew is done, Tatsumi asks to take some of the leftovers to Tamotsu's house, because he thinks the author never gets to eat a good meal. In the end, Sayaka transforms into Cruje and challenges Ureshiko yet again; Ureshiko informs Cruje that the stew will only get cold if they fight.
3	"Adults Are Children, You See"; Transliteration: "Otonatte Kodomo, to Iu Koto" (Japanese: 大人ってコドモ、ということ)	Yoshihisa Matsumoto	Mayori Sekijima	17 July 2005
Sayaka is forced to clean up her classroom at school yet again, and when another student tries to help her, Sayaka reveals to the viewer that all of the citizens of the town are artificial life-forms. After leaving the school, Sayaka encounters Bulga, another magical girl from Realm; Bulga has been sent by the Elders of Realm to collect the Managerial Ring from Agnes Bell. Though Sayaka protests that she does not need anyone's help, Bulga begins to destroy some of the buildings in the Wonderland to lure out Agnes. The plot switches from the battle between Agnes and Bulga to another interview between Tatsumi and Tamotsu Asaba, this time mediated by the manager of the publishing company. In the end, Tatsumi's superior manages to impress Tamotsu by quoting from one of his books. Meanwhile, Bulga has accused Agnes of being too old to hold the Managerial Ring, which is only meant for girls. Agnes responds that adults are children inside, and that she is still young at heart. Bulga launches an assault on Agnes using several stone pillars, but Agnes uses the power of the Managerial Ring to reverse all of the damage and eventually causes Bulga to flee.
4	"An Evening Shower is Dangerous, You See"; Transliteration: "Yūdachi wa Kiken yo, to Iu Koto" (Japanese: 夕立は危険よ、ということ)	Kōichi Takada	Akira Okeya	24 July 2005
Ureshiko notices the title of a novel that Tatsumi is reading, and decides to visit Tamotsu Asaba, who is actually her estranged husband. Both Tatsumi and Ureshiko daydream about the pasts. Tatsumi recalls the happy times he had as a child, whereas Ureshiko can only remember the sadness that occurred on her wedding night. In the end, Ureshiko visits the local cafe to see her friend Nori, who tries to take her mind off her troubles. Meanwhile, Tatsumi meets Sayaka while taking a walk around the town. He inadvertently says that he will go to an amusement park with her, even though there is no such place in the town. Sayaka takes Tatsumi's promise to heart, and decides to use her magic to create an amusement park of her own. Ureshiko notices that something is going on in the rainy weather and transforms into Agnes. While she eventually is able to reverse Cruje's magic, Cruje tells her that she is being selfish and that the Wonderland no longer belongs to her.
5	"Adults Are Okay, You See"; Transliteration: "Otona nara OK yo, to Iu Koto" (Japanese: 大人ならOKよ、ということ)	Tatsuo Miura	Akira Okeya	31 July 2005
Tamotsu gives Tatsumi an assignment to prove his worth as an editor, but fails to live up to the master author's expectations. Sayaka tries once again to elude her classmates, but they corner her on a bridge and force her to show them her home. They criticize Sayaka for being too grown up, causing the young magical girl to dream of what it would be like to actually have the body of an adult. The next day, Sayaka feigns illness and retreats to the nurse's office at school, where she transforms into an older version of herself with magic. While she is wandering around the town, she happens upon Tatsumi, who is studying an old relic in a corner of the city. Ureshiko, who noticed that Sayaka had used magic, reaches the relic just as Tatsumi agrees to meet the new version of Sayaka again, and declares that she no longer cares what he does. Tatsumi presents his new information to Tamotsu, who admits that he is impressed. At home, Tatsumi notices that Ureshiko seems upset, and tells her that a smile suits her better. Sayaka, in turn, praises herself for her cleverness in transforming her body. All three decide that being grown up is a fun, if challenging endeavor.
6	"The Charms of Adults Are, You See"; Transliteration: "Otona no Miryokutte..., to Iu Koto" (Japanese: 大人の魅力って...、ということ)	Hiroshi Nishikiori	Akira Okeya	7 August 2005
The manager of Ureshiko's boarding house injures her back while she exercising with a friend. She gives Tatsumi and Ureshiko two tickets to a mambo concert, along with her unofficial blessing of them as a couple. Ureshiko becomes excited at the thought of going on a date and even goes to tell her friends about it, but her happiness is soon dashed when Tatsumi does not show up at the concert at the appointed time. As it turns out, Tatsumi encounters the older version of Sayaka while on the way to an interview. Tatsumi invites her along, and the two learn about the aging process of ceramic pottery. In the end, Sayaka uses too much of her power to keep herself in her adult form, and Ureshiko has to give up some of her power to keep the spell from breaking in front of Tatsumi. Tatsumi rushes to the concert hall, only to find that the event has already started. Ureshiko arrives as well, and the two dance the mambo together outside of the building.
7	"The Kiss Right in Front of Me, You See"; Transliteration: "Sugu soko ni Aru Kizu, to Iu Koto" (Japanese: すぐそこにあるキス、ということ)	Hiroyuki Ishidō	Mayori Sekijima	14 August 2005
Agnes battles with Chane, another magical girl from Realm, then begins to daydream about when she was dating Tamotsu. She was not able to kiss him even though he was right in front of her. Tamotsu put up with Ureshiko's rule about kissing until their wedding night, when he declared that enough was enough. Sayaka asks Tatsumi to go to the beach with her over the weekend. The next day, Ureshiko meets with Tamotsu for a second time, only to be chastised for getting close to Tatsumi. Meanwhile, Tatsumi and Sayaka's older form enjoy a pleasant day at the ocean, under the watchful eye of Ureshiko and her friend Ururu. By the end of the day, Sayaka finds herself on a familiar patch of beach, and she discovers that she wants to kiss Tatsumi. Just before she does, Sayaka realizes what it would cost, and runs away. Ureshiko, who had been watching the scene from the air, is attacked by Chane and her twin sister, Hermes, who manage to disable her powers. Sayaka reverts to her younger form, transforms into Cruje and saves Ureshiko, saying that she is in no mood to deal with Realm's interference in her affairs.
8	"The Existence of a Dear Person, You See"; Transliteration: "Omou Hito ga Iru, to Iu Koto" (Japanese: 想う人がいる、ということ)	Yoshihisa Matsumoto	Akira Okeya	21 August 2005
Cruje is called back to Realm, and is scolded for not taking over the Wonderland. When she returns, Sayaka consults Yuki, the school nurse, who confirms that she was once a magical girl who helped Agnes. She cautions Sayaka against falling in love, because it can have terrible consequences. That night, Yuki takes Sayaka to a local festival in honor of the dead. She then tells Sayaka that she will be her support, and uses magic to transform into the magical girl Valentine Valentino. Sayaka realizes that Valentine must never have kissed, despite having fallen in love. The viewer then learns the details of Yuki's gruesome past. Agnes arrives expecting to meet Cruje, and is surprised to find her friend Valentine causing trouble at the festival. Valentine manages to throw Agnes off her broom, but before she can take the Managerial Ring from her, Agnes asks her why she wants the Wonderland to change. Valentine says that it is too cruel to live in a world without her loved ones, especially since they are all artificial. Agnes responds that, even if the boy was not real, Valentine's love for him was, and that that is what matters. Valentine realizes the truth, and lets Agnes go, much to Sayaka's chagrin.
9	"So I Have No Regrets, You See"; Transliteration: "Omoinokosu Koto wa Nai Yō ni, to Iu Koto" (Japanese: 思い残すことはないように、ということ)	Motoki Tanaka	Akira Okeya	28 August 2005
Ureshiko comes to Tatsumi's aid during a fight between him and Tamotsu, and says she wants to get a divorce. That night, Tatsumi receives a call from Yuuko. It turns out that Yuuko has become engaged and is having a party with the rest of the college track team. Tatsumi attends, and wishes Yuuko the best of luck in her new life. The next morning, Ureshiko gets a surprise visit from Freya, the former Manager of the Wonderland. Freya tells Ureshiko that she must hand off control of the Wonderland to the next generation, and so she must do what she can so that she will have no regrets when the transition is made. Sayaka is visited by the Elders of Realm, and is told that she will soon control the Wonderland. Sayaka becomes distraught and meets with Tatsumi in her older form. She tries to ask Tatsumi if she can erase him, but runs away after losing her nerve. When Tatsumi catches up to her, Sayaka realizes that she will never have a relationship with him, and tells him to find the person he truly loves. Meanwhile, Freya and Maiko travel to Realm to confront the Elders about their decision. Maiko tells her husband, the head Elder, why the town should stay in its current form, but he does not listen to her. At the end of the episode, Ureshiko and Tatsumi meet, and Ureshiko decides to give up the Managerial Ring and kiss Tatsumi. However, just before they kiss, Ureshiko notices a magical reaction, and changes her mind.
10	"To Open My Mind, You See"; Transliteration: "Kokoro o Hiraku, to Iu Koto" (Japanese: 心を開く、ということ)	Tatsuo Miura	Mayori Sekijima	4 September 2005
Ureshiko transforms into Agnes Bell in front of Tatsumi, finally revealing her secret to him. She then flies off to see what was causing the previous magical reaction. She finds a huge cloud made of magic hanging above the town, but when she enters she is attacked by a group of magical girls. Cruje also enters the cloud, but she does not heed Bulga's suggestion to take the ring from Agnes; instead, Cruje dispels the magic web and flees with Agnes. Agnes sends the whole concoction back to Realm, but Bulga launches a spell of her own, breaking Agnes's broom and knocking her from the sky. Tatsumi manages to catch Agnes before she hits the ground, but breaks his legs in the process. Agnes uses some of her power to heal him, and explains the truth of her position as Manager. Meanwhile, Sayaka has returned to her home, only to find that the Elders are waiting to chastise her for wasting a perfect opportunity. They also tell her that if she does not take over control of the Wonderland in twenty-four hours, they will destroy it by force. Sayaka seals her powers in desperation, and flees her home. The buildings in the town started to catch fire in the interim, and are now facing destruction. Sayaka is met by her classmates, who tell her that the school is ablaze. She soon finds that the class's treasure—the victory flag from the summer baseball tournament—is still inside the building. Sayaka eventually succeeds in rescuing the flag without her magic, but inhales too much smoke and faints. Ureshiko is met by Yuki and uses the Managerial Ring to put out the fire. Yuki tells her that the world is definitely going to change at some point, and that she should prepare before that happens. In the last moments of the episode, the viewer sees what Ureshiko's biggest regret entails: she flies to the home she shared with Tamotsu, and he comes outside only to find his wife in a strange costume.
11	"The Autumn Wind Blowing, You See"; Transliteration: "Aki no Kaze ga Fuita, to Iu Koto" (Japanese: 秋の風が吹いた、ということ)	Kazuo Yamada	Akira Okeya	11 September 2005
The viewer watches as Ureshiko delves deep into her past to the time when she first met Tamotsu years ago. She tells Tamotsu that she thought he would be the only person who could care for her, since he saw through the secret of the Wonderland mere moments after stepping inside it. Tamotsu expresses his regrets for not understanding his wife, but says that if the world is to be destroyed, it is not his affair. After flying home, Ureshiko urgest Tatsumi to flee the Wonderland before it is destroyed by the Elders, and she agrees to leave the town behind if she can live with him. However, when they get to the train station, Ureshiko pushes Tatsumi onto the train just as it speeds off, saying that she will be happy if at least he survives. Meanwhile, the Elders of Realm ready the attack on the Wonderland, despite Freya and Maiko's attempts to dissuade them from destroying the town. Ureshiko, in turn, transforms into Agnes and casts a protective spell to block the attack. She is able to fend off the first round, but when the Elders increase the power of their spells, she is knocked to the ground. Freya and Maiko rebel against the Elders and take away two of the staves necessary to destroy the Wonderland, but Agnes will not able to hold off the assault in her weakened state for long. The Elders then appear to Sayaka and tell her that the summer has ended, and that the autumn wind is now blowing change into the air. Agnes is injured by another round of battle, and tries to fly to her shield to strengthen it from nearby. However, she is hit by lightning and sent back to the ground. Sayaka goes to Agnes, meeting a returning Tatsumi on the way, but rather than steal the Ring from her, she slaps Agnes, telling her not to be so selfish as to try to defend the town on her own. Agnes agrees that she needs everyone's help, and uses the power of the Ring to break the seal on Sayaka's magic, allowing her to instantly transform into Cruje. Together, the two use the Ring to amplify their power and ward off the Elders' attack. Agnes tells Tatsumi and Cruje that she will travel to Realm to confront the Elders, because both she and the Wonderland will be erased if she tries to flee again. Cruje tries to return the Ring, which she will need if the Elders try to punish her, but Agnes says that it would be best for Cruje to keep it for the time being. The episode ends with Agnes teleporting back to her homeland of Realm and opening the doors to the Elders' chamber.
12	"The Heart Is Alive, You See"; Transliteration: "Kokoro ni Ikite Iru, to Iu Koto" (Japanese: 心に生きている、ということ)	Yoshihisa Matsumoto; Hiroyuki Ishidō	Akira Okeya	18 September 2005
Sayaka is sitting at home examining the Managerial Ring when Bulga, Chane, and Hermes appear, telling her that the ring is finally hers, and that she should begin the reconstruction of the Wonderland immediately. When Sayaka says that she is just holding the ring, the three other magical girls chide her into putting on the ring for just a moment, and then hypnotize her. Meanwhile, the viewer gets a taste of Agnes's adult side, as she argues with the Elders once again to keep the Wonderland in its current state. The head of the Council chastises Agnes for not doing a better job of teaching Cruje how to manage the town, and sends her to a prison dimension to reflect on her actions. Sayaka is being taken to the edge of the town so that she can begin the transformation process, but is stopped midway by a boy in her class named Yuki, who also happens to be one of the bullies who has been picking on her all season. Yuki tells Sayaka that he likes her, and she asks if his feelings would be the same even if the world were to change. She then confronts her fellow magical girls, who immediately hypnotize her for a second time. Agnes is feeling sorry for herself in the prison, when she is visited by the spirit of her mother, Aphrodite. Aphrodite tells Agnes that her current state is partially her mother's fault, for she had thrust the idea of an eternal Wonderland on her at a very young age. Aphrodite also tells her the secret to escaping from her prison in order to atone for her past actions—her heart is alive, and if it bonds with someone, the power of that bond will be enough to break the spell. She thinks of Tatsumi, who is also thinking about her, and she is able to break out of her prison and travel back to the Wonderland. The episode ends with Sayaka standing at the top of the hill at the edge of the Wonderland, with her three self-appointed attendants behind her. They are musing over the fact that they will be able to make the changes they want to the Wonderland by using Cruje's magic for their own ends.
13	"You Are Here With Me, You See"; Transliteration: "Anata ga soko ni Iru, to Iu Koto" (Japanese: あなたがそこにいる、ということ)	Hiroshi Nishikiori	Akira Okeya	25 September 2005
Ureshiko is happy that she has been reunited with Tatsumi, but she realizes that she needs to protect the Wonderland if Tatsumi is to exist. She transforms into Agnes Bell and begins the flight to the edge of the town, but is waylaid by Chane and Hermes who tell her that her time as the Manager is finally over. The two begin to execute a sure-kill technique, but before they can actually attack Agnes, they are stopped by Yuki, who has transformed into Valentine Valentino again. Bulga challenges Valentine to a duel, and though the two manage to damage each other, Bulga accidentally succeeds in stabbing Valentine with her umbrella. This causes Chane and Hermes to tell Bulga that they were "just supposed to be scaring Agnes," and that she has taken things too far. Bulga and her two underlings flee the scene, leaving Agnes and a struggling Valentine. However, Valentine says that she can take care of herself, and she summons Tatsumi to Agnes's broom by using Magity before disappearing. Sayaka regains consciousness, and decides what she wants to do with the Wonderland. Agnes and Tatsumi talk about what is going on, and eventually kiss. However, as Sayaka's magic takes control of the Wonderland, Tatsumi disappears, leaving Agnes to cry on her own as the town is changed. The viewer gets a chance to see what the rest of the cast is doing just before the transformation, and then everything fades to white. Ureshiko wakes up, having lost her magic power. She is met by Maiko and Freya, who are soon joined by Tatsumi. They explain that Sayaka's only changes to the Wonderland were to repair the damage done during the Elders' attack on the city. The viewer is then treated to a montage of what is happening to the characters, and watches as Tatsumi asks Tamotsu for permission to have a relationship with Ureshiko. The series ends with Ureshiko saying that she loves the Wonderland, and that it will never change so long as the Managers understand what it means to truly live.
