= List of Oku-sama wa Mahō Shōjo: Bewitched Agnes characters =

Oku-sama wa Mahō Shōjo: Bewitched Agnes (奥様は魔法少女 Bewitched Agnes; literally My Wife is a Magical Girl: Bewitched Agnes) is a magical girl anime comedy. It was produced by Media Factory, J.C.Staff, and Amber Film Works.

== Realm ==
These are many of the characters from Realm, the magical world. From left to right: Sayaka, Yuki, Maiko, Ururu, and Nori. Yuuko and Nori's daughter Ayaka are also pictured.

Realm is the magical kingdom that lies parallel to Earth. All of the characters listed below were either born in Realm or have ties to it that become clear as the story develops.

=== Ureshiko Asaba ===
Ureshiko (Voiced by: Kikuko Inoue) is the current magical girl in charge of managing the Wonderland—her alias is Agnes Bell. She succeeded Freya in the position, and decided to have the Wonderland retain the same identity as that of her two predecessors as an experiment on human potential. Given that she was chosen by the elders of Realm to guard the Wonderland, it is clear that Ureshiko has strong magical powers, and it would come as no surprise if she had the strongest abilities in Realm. However, even a magical girl with powers as great as Ureshiko's would be unable to manage an entire town on her own, and so she must use a ring passed down by previous Managers in order to keep the area stable. Although she knows that her time as the Managerial Magical Girl has probably come to an end, Ureshiko is reluctant to give away her authority; she believes in the power of humans to determine their own fate, and wants to keep the Wonderland the way it is, despite the urging of the Elders for her to change it, and the fact that her costume is becoming more and more revealing as her body grows.

As Agnes Bell, Ureshiko is able to use her powers to fly, create protective barriers, heal wounds, and relieve fatigue, and repair any damage done to the Wonderland by the other magical girls. Given her status as the Manager of the Wonderland, Ureshiko is able to create or destroy life while she is within the limits of the city—she displays this to Tatsumi in a later episode by creating a butterfly out of thin air. She is also able to use the Managerial Ring as an alarm when other magical girls are performing spells. Ureshiko also seems to have some magical abilities even when she has not transformed, including levitation of objects, though her precision is not as great. Ureshiko's wand ornaments take the form of the sun and moon, perhaps as a symbol of her need to be vigilant at all times.

Both transformed and when she is in her civilian guise, Ureshiko is quite clumsy, and nobody is surprised when she falls down stairs, or walks into light posts. She also becomes overwhelmingly upset over relatively small occurrences such as leaving laundry out in the rain and putting the wrong condiments on her food.

Ureshiko has a complex character that develops throughout the series. At the start she seems to be a mature, confident woman, but as the series progresses she begins to doubt her place as the Manager and as a wife. However, she sincerely hopes that her dream of allowing the Wonderland to flourish on its own will come true, and so excuses herself from giving up the position by saying that she is young at heart. Despite being married, Ureshiko lives with her surrogate grandmother in a boarding house and begins to have romantic feelings for Tatsumi, the young man living there. Ureshiko still cares a great deal for her estranged husband, and thought that he would be the only one for her, and so she feels conflicted in her love for Tatsumi. Thoughts of her husband are one of the few things that can ruin Ureshiko's usually bright mood, and she relies on her friends to help recover her confidence. By the midpoint in the series, Ureshiko is able to ask Tamotsu for a divorce, but he sternly refuses, even when she clearly states that she no longer loves him.

In the end, Ureshiko is able to reveal her true identity to her husband, who forgives her for never expressing her love for him physically. Ureshiko regains her confidence in her abilities and in herself, and she returns to Realm to explain her reasons for protecting the town. She approaches the elders directly, pointedly bypassing the podium used by other visitors, and speaks freely—she really does go full circle.

=== Sayaka Kurenai ===
Sayaka (Voiced by: Ai Shimizu) has been chosen to be the successor to Ureshiko as the Manager of the Wonderland—her alias is Cruje Gapp. She believes that the Wonderland needs to be changed in order for it to be fun, and wastes no time in trying to transform it into a "cute place." Sayaka constantly demands that Ureshiko hand over the ring so that she may begin the process of remaking the world, though Ureshiko refuses every time.

As the Manager-in-Training, Sayaka also has strong magical powers—though she does not possess the Managerial ring, she is able to create and transform objects to suit her mood. This has included remodeling a school, building parts of an amusement park, and creating a home for herself out of thin air. Sayaka is also able to use magic when not transformed into Cruje, including sealing away her powers for a limited time, and changing her appearance so that she can meet Tatsumi in secret. However, since she does not have the Manager's Ring, the limits to her power are much lower than for Agnes, and so she becomes tired when she uses too much magic power at once. Her wand ornaments take the form of a Saturn-like planet and a moon.

Sayaka comes off as an ambitious, hard worker who wants nothing more than to have fun in the new Wonderland. However, as the series progresses, she comes to understand her other emotions, including her loneliness as a Managerial Candidate, her need for friends her own age, and her budding love for Tatsumi. Though she initially shows disdain for the classmates she finds when she enrolls in a local middle school, Sayaka begins to find the humor in their actions, and helps to put out a fire that threatens to destroy the school. Once she gains possession of the Managerial Ring, she finds that she is reluctant to put it on and assume her responsibility as the new Manager.

Sayaka has a paradoxical idea about what it means to be a child. In on sense, she wants to remain as a young girl, because "only girls have the right to manage the Wonderland." However, she also seems to want to be treated with the respect that is given only to those who have experienced the world around them, and resents the fact that both Ureshiko and the rest of the cast treat her as a child. In order to have a relationship with Tatsumi, Sayaka periodically alters her appearance so that she looks like someone closer to his age, and then tags along on his work assignments. She finds that she wants to kiss Tatsumi as time goes by, but stops herself at the last moment to protect her magical powers. By the end of the series, Sayaka understands that Tatsumi cannot love her in her child form, and allows him to pursue his relationship with Ureshiko.

=== Bulga ===
Bulga (Voiced by: Akeno Watanabe) is the third magical girl to be introduced to the series, and acts as a foil to both Ureshiko and Sayaka throughout the plot. Bulga arrives in the Wonderland as a messenger of Realm's elders. Her job is to find out Sayaka has not taken possession of the Managerial Ring, and to assist her in any way possible. However, Cruje reveals that she was the second-ranked magical girl in the competition to become the next manager, and she makes no attempt to hide her contempt for her former opponent. After relaying the Elders' message, Bulga strikes out on her own to take the ring for herself and usurp the position of Manager, but is unable to take it out of Ureshiko's possession. She later forms an alliance with Chane and Hermes to take the ring away from Agnes and present it to Cruje.

Unlike Ureshiko and Sayaka, Bulga never transforms into a magical girl in order to use her powers. Instead, she makes use of an ever-twirling umbrella as both her broom and wand, and is able to move stone, animate objects, and manipulate the wind with ease. Bulga is also able to hypnotize Sayaka on two separate occasions, and has the ability to transfigure herself into a dog. She needs to use only the common magical phrase "Magity" when using her destructive spells, and is able to perform her other magic without it.

Bulga is the most calculating of the magical girls who come from Realm to help Cruje. She displays the most destructive tendencies, and does not seem to mind damaging the Wonderland as long as it helps her achieve her goals. However, her ambition does seem to have some limits, as she flees in fear from Agnes once all the damage she caused was repaired in an instant by the Manager's power. Though she shows little development during the series, she does seem to have some human emotion—when she accidentally attacks Valentine with her umbrella, she automatically apologizes and flies away. At the very end of the series, it is hinted that Bulga will live in the Wonderland as an attendant to Cruje, and she seems to be making friends with some of the other children at the middle school.

=== Chane and Hermes ===
Chane and Hermes are twin magical girls from Realm who work with Bulga to steal the Managerial Ring from Agnes. Chane is the first to appear, and challenges Agnes on her own. When Chane loses, she warns Agnes that her time as a magical girl is limited. This causes Agnes to perform an aggressive spell for the only time in the series—she breaks the spell on Chane's broom, causing her to fall out of the sky. In the next battle, Hermes ambushes Agnes while she is dodging Chane's attack. The two are not seen apart after this point, and work in tandem to reach their goals. Toward the end of the series, they are seen to be allies of Bulga, and reveal that they are to be Cruje's support once the Wonderland is changed.

Like Bulga, neither Hermes nor Chane transform into the traditional magical girl uniform of this series. Instead, the two wear identical outfits, and, in traditional anime style, the only difference between them is in the angle of their hats. The pair travel around on "brooms" that resemble spoons, and are able to cast spells without the use of wands. In addition to being able to use magic to create objects out of the air, Chane and Hermes are able to use magical shuriken and transform into a pair of crows. They, along with Bulga, hypnotize Cruje later in the series.

Hermes and Chane show little development during the course of the series. They only appear in several episodes, and do not take part in the show's epilogue. They exist as subordinates to the will of Realm's elders, and, to a lesser extent, Bulga's.

=== Yuki Tanishimi ===
Yuki (Voiced by: Yuri Amano) is the nurse at the middle school in which Sayaka enrolls at the start of the series. Though she does not initially display any magical power, she is able to see Sayaka's first attempt at rebuilding the Wonderland, and cautions her against further action until she successfully inherits the Managerial Ring.

Yuki's identity as both a citizen of Realm and a magical girl is not confirmed until Episode 8 of the series, when she reveals to Sayaka that she still possesses magical powers. Yuki goes on to tell Sayaka about her past, in which she was an attendant to Ureshiko as she succeeded the position of Manager. Yuki also tells the younger girl about her first love, a young man who drove a motorcycle. Though she loved the boy, Yuki remained devoted to Ureshiko, and politely refused to kiss him in order to keep her powers as long as possible. However, on the day that Yuki received her nursing school exam results, she discovered that her boyfriend had died in an accident.

As a second "older magical girl," Yuki's name changes to Valentine Valentino, and she insists that Ureshiko call her this when they meet. In general, Valentine's powers are similar to Ureshiko's. She can use attack magic based on fiery explosions, and can fly a broom with skill. Though she claims that she wants to see the Wonderland changed so that she will no longer be reminded of her loved one's death, she does not display the same destructive abilities as the other antagonists in her quest to defeat Agnes. She is also able to use the standard spell, Magity, to perform various functions. Her wand's shape is similar to that of an ear cleaner, perhaps as a tribute to her work as a nurse.

Yuki shows some distinct character development during the course of the series. At the start, she plays the role of concerned guardian to Sayaka, who is alone in the Wonderland. During this period, it is not made entirely clear that she was originally from Realm, though she does have some insight into Sayaka's romantic struggle. At one point, Sayaka calls Yuki by her magical girl name, but, before that point, she had not been called by her civilian name. As viewers learn more about Yuki's past, she begins to appear sullen, as if she has given up on her life in the Wonderland. However, after Ureshiko confronts her about her attitudes toward the people of the Wonderland, she begins to feel hope for the future once again. By the end of the series, Yuki uses her power to aid Ureshiko, and at the end of the series she continues to guard her magic powers in order to watch over Sayaka's progress.

=== Ururu and Nori ===
Ururu Kinjou (Voiced by: Yuri Shiratori) and Nori Misugi (Voiced by: Akiko Hiramatsu) are Ureshiko's closest friends while she is in the Wonderland. She confides in them her growing feelings for Tatsumi and her frustration at having to turn over the Wonderland to a successor who is only going to change it. Nori echoes Ureshiko's concerns, saying that she does not "want to see the environment where her daughter will grow up change." Ururu, on the other hand, says that the world will not change too much, that there will still be men around in the new world, and that Ureshiko "should worry more about her own happiness." Despite their differing opinions on how the Wonderland should be run, both are genuinely concerned by Ureshiko's plight, and both point out to Ureshiko that "protecting her kiss" is a dangerous thing, as it will never allow her to become a complete adult. Though it is never stated in the course of the series that Ururu and Nori are from the Wonderland, a drama CD that is set before events of the show confirms that they used to be members of Ureshiko's support network when she first took over as Manager.

=== Freya ===
Freya (Voiced by: Rica Matsumoto) is a secondary character in the series who shows little development because she does not appear often until the end. She has no special name for herself while she is in the Wonderland, and goes by her name from Realm during all conversations. However, some information can be provided.

Freya was the Managerial Magical Girl during the term before Ureshiko's. She took over the position from Aphrodite, and, though the Wonderland is meant to undergo a transformation at the start of every new term, Freya decided to leave it the same way in order to see how its inhabitants developed. She visits Ureshiko during Episode 9 to advise her against keeping the Managerial Ring any longer and that the Elders have officially stripped her of her title, but confides in her successor that she is doing the right thing.

Though she was once the Manager of the Wonderland, Freya does not display any magic during the series, and so it may be that she has already kissed. There is also no footage of her from the past, and so there is no way to know exactly what her powers were. However, Ureshiko does look up to Freya as an older sister and a helpful mentor, a vision that Freya believes she does not deserve.

Freya is the daughter of Maiko, the old woman who lives with Ureshiko, and one of the head elders of Realm. Though Freya is outwardly respectful of both of her parents and wants them to get along, she seems to side with her mother ideologically.

=== Maiko Motohiro ===
Maiko Motohiro (Voiced by: Atsuko Mine) is the owner of the boarding house in which Ureshiko lives while she is estranged from her husband. She acts as a surrogate grandmother to Ureshiko, offering her helpful, if sarcastic, advice throughout the series. It is revealed in Episode 9 that Maiko is the mother of Freya, and has a relationship with one of Realm's chief elders.

Although Maiko has an adult daughter, she is able to use magic to help Ureshiko with the housework and to check on her from time to time. Given the magic paradigm that exists within this series, this would suggest that Maiko has never kissed a human from the Wonderland. It is unknown whether Maiko's powers are a special case due to her role as an elder's wife, or if magic power returns upon reaching adulthood.

Maiko is owner of the cynical attitude that often appears in older women in anime. Despite her age, she refuses to believe that she is not a vital woman, and regularly practices the mambo with a male friend of hers. She has a husband, but does not seem to notice that he is one of the leaders of Realm—she treats him as she does everyone else, and chastises him when he tries to wield his authority. Though she is one of the oldest characters in the series, she also has one of the most vibrant hearts, and defends the fact that the Wonderland is indeed changing with time.

=== Aphrodite ===
Aphrodite (Voiced by: Mika Doi) is the name that Ureshiko's mother used when she was a magical girl. She is never explicitly given a name in the Wonderland, because the only people who mention her are those who come from Realm. Aphrodite was the Managerial Magical Girl two terms before Ureshiko, and changed the Wonderland into a traditional, rural town some years ago. It is unknown whether she urged Freya to maintain the Wonderland in that form, but her two successors each chose to keep it the way it was, in order to allow the people there to live on their own. Aphrodite knew that she would one day have to leave the world behind, but she wanted to leave a piece of herself behind.

Little is known about Aphrodite, as her physical form never appears in the series. She exists only in flashbacks until Episode 12, when she comes to Ureshiko to give her confidence. It is unknown whether the real Aphrodite has died, or where she could be living at the present time, but her astral body dotes on Ureshiko, showing that she is a loving mother. For Ureshiko, Aphrodite is an ideal for what it means to be a magical girl and a strong woman.

=== The Elders of Realm ===
This group of magicians is in charge of many of the functions of Realm, including the punishment of magical girls, the auditing of the Wonderland's progress, and overseeing of the Manager.

For the majority of the series, the Elders are seen as the second line of antagonists working from the shadows to overthrow Ureshiko's version of the Wonderland. They send Cruje to the world below for her to succeed to the position of Manager, and urge her to change the Wonderland as soon as possible. They periodically check in with Cruje by possessing her collection of teddybears, and continue to nudge her into altering the Wonderland, which they think has remained in the same state for far too long. In the end, they decide to undermine Ureshiko's authority as the Manager and erase the Wonderland completely by creating a giant thunderstorm. Even when Agnes and Cruje manage to deflect the attack on the Wonderland, the elders do not relent, and send Agnes to a Punishment Dimension until Cruje has begun her term.

For all of their malice and dislike of the Wonderland that has survived through the terms of three Managers, the elders should be given credit. To most people in the Realm, the Wonderland is not a real place, but a temporary diversion. The elders are under immense pressure from other powers within Realm to change the Wonderland, which had become boring to Realm's population. From this perspective, the elders can be seen as less malicious and more as bureaucrats, who try to please the majority.

== Earth ==
The following characters are members of the cast who are from Earth and have no visible ties to Realm. These characters are not originally from the Wonderland managed by Ureshiko. As the series does not make it clear whether there are other Wonderlands in the world, these characters may be completely human, or they may have been artificially created like those in the Wonderland.

=== Tatsumi Kagura ===
At the start of the series, Tatsumi Kagura (Voiced by: Daisuke Kishio) is introduced as a college-aged young man who left school after sustaining an injury. Tatsumi was an athlete who specialized in the high jump, but he hit the bar and hurt himself during a competition. In order to move on, Tatsumi left the school to start a new life in what turns out to be the Wonderland. By chance he rents a room in the boarding house run by Ureshiko and Maiko, and takes a job working at a local publishing company. He enjoys spending time with Ureshiko, but worries about how he appears in front of older women like her.

During his stay at the boarding house, Tatsumi begins to develop romantic feelings for Ureshiko, whom he sees as a mature older woman who can also act like a child. When he finds out that Ureshiko is really the magical girl in charge of the Wonderland, he is surprised, but decides that that does not change his feelings for her. He and Ureshiko plan to flee the Wonderland when the elders launch their attack, but Ureshiko leaves at the last moment, saying that she is happy that at least he will survive. Not content to leave the woman he loves to die, Tatsumi risks being erased himself to help Ureshiko. In the end, the two decide to become a couple despite their substantial difference in age.

Tatsumi shows viewers his steady yet haphazard personality through his actions during the show. Though he knows little about the editing and publishing business, Tatsumi immediately takes a liking to the job, as it gives him a chance to learn about a variety of topics through his work. He is initially intimidated by his first big assignment, but eventually comes to think of it as a rite of passage. He takes this same stance in his personal life, as he becomes romantically involved both with Ureshiko and Sayaka's adult form. Though he never figures out that Sayaka was using magic to transform herself, Tatsumi decides that he has deeper feelings for Ureshiko, and pursues her until the show's ending. Tatsumi also comes to terms with the fact that his life as an athlete has ended by overcoming his apprehension of the high jump.

=== Tamotsu Asaba ===
Tamotsu Asaba (Voiced by: Juurouta Kosugi) is a famous author within the show's universe, and has published several popular novels that detail the human condition and the nature of existence. His work in the field of belles lettres has led him to win several awards, but is not currently working on any projects. He is currently being wooed by several editing and publishing companies for the rights to his new project, but he cannot decide between two until the end of the series. Though he has become famous for his work, Tamotsu still possesses a sense of professional modesty and does not like it when people openly praise his writing.

Tamotsu is also confirmed to be Ureshiko's estranged husband early in the series. While it is initially unclear why the two have separated, it soon becomes clear that Tamotsu has taken on a mistress, and that he is not ashamed to meet her in public.

Tamotsu arrived in the Wonderland years ago while on a pilgrimage to develop his writing skills. He came to the town on a snowy day, and described it in his notes as "The town that Time forgot." A younger Ureshiko noticed this, and confirmed that this was the case. Tamotsu immediately took an interest in the young girl, and the two began to see each other socially. Though Ureshiko has deep feelings for her first love, she cannot bring herself to kiss him, a fact that Tamotsu reluctantly accepts.

Tamotsu and Ureshiko eventually decided to get married in the traditional Japanese style, and on their wedding night, Tamotsu expects his long-awaited kiss. When she still refuses, he becomes upset, saying that he doubts her feelings for him.

Tamotsu is a mysterious character, in that he claims not to be tied to anyone in the world, but will not actually engage Ureshiko in a divorce. On the two on-screen occasions that Ureshiko visits their home, Tamotsu verbally abuses her and demands that she leave, but only after attempting once again to kiss her; he claims that he is miserable without her. However, Tamotsu also has a human side, which is evidenced by his sweet tooth and the fact that he remembers the distinct taste of his wife's cooking.

When Ureshiko finally reveals the truth to him near the series' end, he says that he "had a hunch," and immediately guesses that the people of Wonderland are artificial. He cries a single tear at the thought that he has lost Ureshiko as a wife, and wonders what might have been. However, he decides to live the way he wants, and will continue to write within the Wonderland, even if it means he will be erased along with it. In the end, Tamotsu is able to finish his latest novel after all.

=== Yuuko Ayase ===
Yuuko (Voiced by: Masumi Asano) plays a small role in the series. She was the manager of the track team at Tatsumi's school, and developed a close relationship with him as a result. She refers to him with the traditional "senpai" honorific, and has great respect for him despite his choice to leave the school. Yuuko is the one who arranges for Tatsumi to live with Maiko and Ureshiko, and helps him transport his belongings to the boarding house.

When Yuuko arrives at Maiko's boarding house, she greets her by saying, "It's been a long time." It is unknown how or why Yuuko knows about Maiko, but the two seem to recognize each other, if nothing else. She refers to Maiko as "Oba-san," but since this is a traditional way of attending to the elderly and not a direct translation to "Grandmother," this does not mean that the two characters are related.

Though it is fairly obvious that Yuuko has romantic feelings for Tatsumi, he is completely oblivious to them, even when she offers to become his bride. After she seems him off, Yuuko does her best to forget about Tatsumi and push him away when he contacts her. In episode 9, Yuuko announces that she will be marrying a friend from childhood. Despite this, Yuuko looks sad when she says her goodbyes to Tatsumi, suggesting that her feelings for him have not changed.

== Wonderland ==
The characters from the Wonderland, from left to right:

As far as the show has revealed, these characters are all from the Wonderland, and thus are artificial life-forms created Aphrodite, Freya, or Agnes when they created their versions of the Wonderland. As the Wonderland has not been changed for three terms, it may be that these individuals are descendants of those created by the earlier Managers. Both those who were born in the Wonderland and those who happen to be in it will be erased if the Wonderland is changed, but that they have no knowledge of this. In this way, the Wonderland can be thought of as a large-scale experiment run by the people of Realm on the effects of different living conditions on a population.

=== The Publishing Staff ===
Soon after moving to the Wonderland, Tatsumi secures a job working for Kashiwa Publishing, a small editing and publishing company that handles local publications such as the Bush Clover magazine. Though they do not have a wide range of clients, the company is looking to expand its coverage by attaining the rights to Tamotsu Asaba's latest book, with the hopes of getting him to write a series in the future. As the company does not want to lose any time or energy in pursuing such a long shot, the head of the company decides to put Tatsumi on the case, claiming that it will be a learning experience for him.

The company remains small because the president allows workers to come and go as they please and take time off to take care of family and other personal affairs. One of the employees claims that the company "lacks tension" as a result, and that serious authors do not take the firm seriously. It is later revealed that this is because the president left a leading firm after not having enough time to spend with his own family.

The staff is made up of a kind senior editor (Kashiwada), several male publishers (Shioya), a female PR agent, and a clerical worker.

=== The Rival Editor (Kusakabe-san) ===
This young woman is actually Tamotsu's mistress as well as one of the publishers who is trying to get the rights to his new book. She is quite cunning in her pursuit of both the author and his work, and does not hesitate to tell Tatsumi that he has no chance of getting Tamotsu to sign a contract. At another point, she makes a pass at Tatsumi in order to distract him from the publishing job, only to claim that he assaulted her when Tatsumi does not agree.

Though she appears ruthless, the rival editor does seem to have genuine feelings for Tamotsu aside from her wishes to work with him professionally. Though her company does not end up getting the rights to Tamotsu's book, she shows up at the book's unveiling, and seems happy to be spending time with Tamotsu socially.

=== Sayaka's Classmates ===
Sayaka enrolls in a middle school in the Wonderland to take up some of her time while she waits for Ureshiko to give up the Managerial Ring. The members of her class do not seem to like her at the beginning of the story, but both she and the other students grow on each other as time goes by.

On her first day, Sayaka is told by the class bully that she has to clean the classroom by herself every day for a week as a hazing ritual, and then pile on more work when she excels in class. She is also bothered every so often by a clique of upper-class girls who demand to see her house and play with her belongings. A fellow transfer student tries to commiserate with Sayaka's plight as the new girl in the class, but is not able to convince her that things will change. Over time the rest of the class begins to warm up to Sayaka, even inviting her to go to the beach with them, but she refuses to see them as more than a bunch of kids.

The situation with Sakaya's classmates changes in a later episode, when the school is ravaged by a large fire. The students are able to escape the building without being injured, but discover that their class flag is still inside the building. Sayaka initially refuses to help save either the building or the flag, but she eventually decides to help out. When she discovers that her classmates have drawn her along with the rest of the class on the flag, she is touched, and decides to work on her relationships with them.
