= List of UFO Ultramaiden Valkyrie episodes =

UFO Ultramaiden Valkyrie (円盤皇女ワるきゅーレ, Yūfō Purinsesu Warukyūre) is a comedy anime series based on the manga series UFO Princess Valkyrie. A total of 32 episodes and one specially released OVA episode were produced. Seasons 1 and 2 were broadcast in Japan on Kids Station between 2002 and 2004. The anime series was released on DVD in Japan between 2002 and 2006. All episodes and the special were dubbed in English and released as DVD collections in North America by ADV Films from 2006 to 2007.

== Episode list ==
=== UFO Ultramaiden Valkyrie (TV) ===
No.	Title	Original release date
1	"The Bathhouse With an Angel"; Transliteration: "Ten'nyo no Iru Sentō" (Japanese: 天女のいる銭湯)	July 4, 2002
Valkyrie and Kazuto are playing hide and seek. Kazuto finds Valkyrie sleeping in the spaceship. As he wakes her up Valkyrie accidentally turns the switch on in the spaceship making it go haywire.
2	"The Transforming Princess Valkyrie"; Transliteration: "Henshin Kōjo Warukyūre" (Japanese: 変身皇女ワルキューレ)	July 11, 2002
Valkyrie crashes on Kazuto, and gives him half of her soul. She comes to live with him and Akina and Rika do not like it. Hydra comes to Earth from Valhalla to bring Valkyrie back and Valkyrie and Kazuto hide, but Hydra finds them. Valkyrie transforms and fights her off until Akina is able to seal Hydra.
3	"Head Cat-Girl Maid, Ms. Sanada"; Transliteration: "Nekomimi Jijo Naga Sanada-san" (Japanese: 猫耳侍女長真田さん)	July 18, 2002
The head catgirl maid for Valkyrie, Sanada arrives on Earth. She sees the relationship between Akina and Kazuto, and decides to try to break up the relationship by turning Akina into an obedient catgirl maid.
4	"What Your Wings Are For"; Transliteration: "Kimi no Hane ga Mezasu mono" (Japanese: 君の羽根がめざすもの)	July 25, 2002
Prince Triam comes to Earth to look for Valkyrie. He finds out that Valkyrie has turned into a child because she gave half of her soul to Kazuto, and so he tries to take that half back from Kazuto.
5	"Rika Acts Her Age"; Transliteration: "Rika-chan Saijiki" (Japanese: リカちゃん歳時記)	August 1, 2002
The basketball star at Rika's school confesses his feelings of love for Rika, but Rika turns him down because she is too busy studying for exams. Marduk has been hired to kidnap Valkyrie but his plans are foiled by Kazuto.
6	"Princess Memorial"; Transliteration: "Hime-sama Memoriaru" (Japanese: 姫様メモリアル)	August 8, 2002
Ms. Sanada purchases a video camera through the Galactic Internet Shopping Page so that she can film Princess Valkyrie. She happens to film a scene where Valkyrie is playing with Hydra and accidentally activates the automatic defense system on Hydra's UFO. Valkyrie and Hydra work together to stop the out of control UFO.
7	"Runaway Princess Laine"; Transliteration: "Dassen Kōjo Raine" (Japanese: 脱線皇女ライネ)	August 15, 2002
Laine, another princess of Valhalla lands on Earth. She is in love with Valkyrie, and when she finds out that Valkyrie is staying on Earth because of Kazuto, she decides to try and break them up. She decides to do this by transforming into the females around Kazuto in order to seduce him.
8	"A Vacation for the Cat-Girl Maids"; Transliteration: "Nekomimi Ian Ryokō" (Japanese: 猫耳慰安旅行)	August 22, 2002
The Catgirl maids suggest that they all go on a vacation at the beach. Laine decides to join them.
9	"Akina's Miniature Transformation"; Transliteration: "Akina Ko Henshin" (Japanese: 秋菜小変身)	August 29, 2002
Akina accidentally turns herself small instead of Hydra when Laine crash lands on her. While she is a little kid she discovers how nice it can be to be a kid. She also manages to confess her feelings for Kazuto to Hydra and Valkyrie and wonders why she is unable to be as genuine and honest when she is an adult.
10	"How I Bought an Asteroid Over the Internet"; Transliteration: "Tsūhan de Shōwakusei o Katta Hanashi" (Japanese: 通販で小惑星を買った話)	September 5, 2002
Valkyrie accidentally buys an asteroid over the internet in Kazutos name; therefore the order can not be canceled. This means Kazuto would have to sell the bathhouse.
11	"Tokino Bathhouse Space Annex"; Transliteration: "Tokinoyu Uchū Bekkan" (Japanese: 時乃湯宇宙別館)	September 12, 2002
During the battle the asteroid is shot and a hot spring gushes from it. It also has a healing effect of curing souls, and Valkyrie's soul is healed by this hot spring. Now that she is healed, she no longer needs to be with Kazuto.
12	"A Ride into Fantasy for Valkyrie"; Transliteration: "Warukyūre Mugen Kikō" (Japanese: ワるきゅーレ夢幻騎行)	September 19, 2002
Kazuto realizes that Valkyrie is not as strong as he thought and that the reason he can no longer connect with her from the heart is because he keeps seeing a shadow of an angel in Valkyrie.

==== OVAs ====
No.	Title	Original release date
SP1	"Special Series' Highlights Episode"	TBA
A special ~45 minute episode with video outtakes from episodes of the first season narrated by Ms. Sanada.
SP2	"The Excruciating Bridal Training"; Transliteration: "Shichiten Battou Hanayome Shugyou"	September 5, 2006
In the special episode to season 1, the queen from Valhalla planet arrives on earth with a virtual-world-program, called "bride training boot camp". They built several pairs which have to take a random card with a special situation that might occur if you are married. For instance Kazuto and Valkyrie have to make dinner, Raine and Kazuto's sister have to manage poverty or Akina and Hydra have to prepare a wedding ceremony as bride and groom (so everyone gets the most unlikely and unsuitable situation).

=== UFO Ultramaiden Valkyrie 2: December Nocturne (TV) ===
No.	Title	Original release date
1	"The Key of Time"; Transliteration: "Toki no Kagi" (Japanese: 時の鍵)	October 4, 2003
Valkyrie still lives with Kazuto. One day a giant wand-like object called "the Key of Time" appears before Valkyrie while she's playing at the park. She starts helping others with the power of Key of Time and she keeps on using it without knowing its real power and purpose. Just as she helps Spot with the Key of Time, it goes out of control all of a sudden. It turns into a chaos involving the entire town.
2	"Cyborg Princess Chorus"; Transliteration: "Kikai Oujou Chorus" (Japanese: 機械皇女コーラス)	October 11, 2003
The people at Tokino Bathhouse get ready for the cold weather. Rika goes to her room looking for a kotatsu and when she opens the closet door there's a girl sitting inside of it. She's another princess from Valhalla named Princess Chorus. She tells everyone that she's a cyborg and she has only three days left to live. She wishes to make good memories before she dies so asks Kazuto to go out on the date with her.
3	"Wave Princess Chorus"; Transliteration: "Denpa Oujou Chorus" (Japanese: 電波皇女コーラス)	October 18, 2003
Chorus now lives with the people of the Tokino Bathhouse. One day she senses that some sort of crisis is about to happen on the earth. Chorus tells everyone about this crisis but no one pays attention to what she has to say. But just like she predicted, an enormous flying object appeared in the air one day!
4	"Girls of Planet Academy"; Transliteration: "Gakuen Wakusei no Otome-tachi" (Japanese: 学園惑星の乙女たち)	October 25, 2003
This explains how Laine and Chorus came to attend the middle school of Planet Academy.
5	"Valkyrie Ghost"; Transliteration: "Warukyūru・Gōsuto" (Japanese: ワルキューレ・ゴースト)	November 1, 2003
One day Kazuto runs into a girl who looks just like Valkyrie. Ever since that day Kazuto hasn't been himself, mesmerized by the mysterious beauty of this girl who calls herself "Valkyrie Ghost". Akina and Hydra notice that Kazuto has been acting a little strange and decide to follow him. When Akina and Hydra turn a corner, following Kazuto, they saw Valkyrie Ghost standing there, leaning against Kazuto's body.
6	"Mehm Night Flight"; Transliteration: "Meemu Yakan Hikou" (Japanese: メーム夜間飛行)	November 8, 2003
Mehm decides to visit the Tokino Bathhouse to check on the girls. She also brings everyone the new bath product which was just released in space. When they pour the package into the water, everyone is engulfed in light and turn into kids. Since Mehm was older than everyone, she is now a young and beautiful girl who gains attention of boys wherever she goes. Supposedly the strange concoction lasts for three days before the effects wear off.
7	"Super Karaoke War 1"; Transliteration: "Dai-ichi shi Super Karaoke Taisen" (Japanese: 第一次スーパーカラオケ大戦)	November 15, 2003
While Valkyrie is watching her favorite TV show "Little Bunny Pyonko", the TV breaks down. Akina tries to fix it by banging it a couple of times but there's no use. Kazuto brings a flyer of the karaoke contest hosted by the Hagoromo shopping district. Everyone decides to participate in the contest hoping to win the first prize, a brand new big screen TV!
8	"Catgirls in Mount Hakkoda"; Transliteration: "Nekomimi Hakkouda-san" (Japanese: 猫耳八甲田山)	November 22, 2003
Valkyrie and the entire Catgirl Maid Squad go on a picnic to the snowy mountains but can't seem to find their destination. They eventually all get separated due to the blizzard. Ms. Sanada starts to see illusions.
9	"The Most Powerful Super Girl Akidra" (Japanese: 最強超女秋ドラ)	November 29, 2003
Akina and Hydra were no match against Valkyrie Ghost. They each start special training, hoping to defeat her one day. But something happens and Hydra and Akina combine into one and become the most powerful super girl "Akidra"! Now they go to school as Akidra, the super girl with awesome psychic power and physical strength.
10	"Twelve Black Moons"; Transliteration: "Kuroi jouni no tsuki" (Japanese: 黒い十二の月)	December 6, 2003
Akidra with amplified psychic power analyzes the ominous wave motion and sees 12 black moons. In order to solve the mystery of a certain legend of Valhalla, Ms. Sanada contacts Mehm immediately. Valkyrie Ghost appears again and Mehm now stands up against her.
11	"Four Lost Princesses"; Transliteration: "Ushinawareta yon oujou" (Japanese: 失われた四皇女)	December 13, 2003
Tokino Bathhouse has been closed ever since Kazuto was taken away by Valkyrie Ghost and Valkyrie is very depressed. Mehm who's figured out the core of the problem is in Valhalla takes everyone and heads there. Thanks to Mehm and Akidra, the mystery surrounding the connection of Valkyrie Ghost and the twelve black moons finally becomes clear.
12	"Soaring Valkyrie"; Transliteration: "Dai kakeru Warukyure" (Japanese: 天翔けるワルキューレ)	December 20, 2003
Mehm, Valkyrie and the others continue to search for Kazuto in the airship. Valkyrie's body responds to Kazuto's voice and turns into an adult form. With the help of the Key of Time she successfully rescues him and stopped the Blizzard of Time in the space.

=== UFO Ultramaiden Valkyrie 3 ===
==== Part 1: Bride of Celestial Souls' Day (OVA) ====
No.	Title	Original release date
1	"About the Relationship Between Girls and Glasses"; Transliteration: "Otome to Megame no Kankei ni Tsuite" (Japanese: 乙女と眼鏡の関係について)	December 22, 2004
A mysterious new teacher just crash landed on the school, and she's got an unusual fetish: she wants all the female students to start wearing glasses!
2	"Inarba, the Goddess of Judgment"; Transliteration: "Sabaki no Megami Inaruba" (Japanese: 裁きの女神 イナルバ)	December 22, 2004
Inarba, the Princess of Judgment, arrives on the scene to punish anyone who breaks the royal rules of Valhalla. Violators beware, incurring the wrath of Inarba is your worst nightmare!
3	"The Caped Cat-Girl is Here"; Transliteration: "Nekomimizuki tanjou" (Japanese: 猫耳頭巾参上)	December 22, 2004
Valkyrie and Kazuto set out in search of twelve magical stones with the power to grant them a long and happy marriage, but they better watch out for those pesky demons!
4	"Laine, Laine, Laine"; Transliteration: "Raine・Raine・Raine" (Japanese: ライネ・ライネ・ライネ)	December 22, 2004
Laine's trip to the hair salon turns into a time-travelling adventure when a new massage technique brings her face to face with a younger version of herself!
5	"Runaway princess Valkyrie"; Transliteration: "iede oujou WARUKYUURE" (Japanese: 家出皇女ワルキューレ)	December 22, 2004
Princess Valkyrie runs away from home when she's given boring old sweet potatoes as a snack instead of delicious cake. Later in the day, an enchanting kiss leads to something big!
6	"Battle of the Wedding Chapel in the Sky"; Transliteration: "Tenkūkaku Kekkon Shiki Shiro no Kōbō" (Japanese: 天空閣結婚式城の攻防)	December 22, 2004
Nesty recovers the Mural of the Legendary Princess in honor of Valkyrie's wedding, but the ceremony is disrupted when space pirates try to steal the priceless artifact!

==== Part 2: Banquet of Time, Dreams, and Galaxies (OVA) ====
No.	Title	Original release date
7	"Valkyrie's Big Reunion"; Transliteration: "Warukyūre Dai Dōsōkai" (Japanese: ワルキューレ大同窓会)	July 21, 2006
Princess Pharm dreams up the idea of a reunion for Valkyrie's old academy class, but she doesn't bother to tell anyone about it! Who will organize the party? Will anyone even show up?
8	"Star of Hopes, Star of Dreams"; Transliteration: "Negai-Boshi, Omoi Hoshi" (Japanese: 願い星、想い星)	September 21, 2006
Inarba wants Akina to show off her moves during a very important ritual dance in honor of the Celestial Comet. It's of the utmost importance that the performance is perfect, so the priestess better start practicing!

=== UFO Princess Valkyrie: SPECIAL – Bridal Training ===
- Directed by Tetsuya Yanagisawa
- Released October 5, 2006
- Runtime 24 minutes

== Music themes ==
Opening and ending themes used in each episode for the four season releases and the OVA are listed. Also list is the incidental music used in certain episodes.

Opening Theme (Season 1)
"Itoshii Kakera" by Melocure
Ending Theme (Season 1)
"Save" by Hisayo Mochizuki
Opening Theme (Season 2)
"Meguriai" by Melocure
Ending Theme (Season 2)
"Marble" by Hisayo Mochizuki, Chinami Nishimura, Rie Tanaka and Saeko Chiba
Opening Theme (Season 3)
"Natsu no Mukougawa" by Meg Hinata (#1–4)
"One Kiss" by Megumi Ogata (#5–6)
Ending Theme (Season 3)
"Uchuu no Hana" by Kikuko Inoue, Mai Kadowaki, and Yuu Asakawa (#1–4)
"Sorekara" by Kenichi Suzumura (#5–6)
Incidental "Love Song"
"Agape" by Melocure
Incidental Talent Show Song (By Little Valkyrie)
"Suki-Suki-Suki wa na Kanji (I Love it, Love it, Love it, Feels like Harmony):
by Hisayo Mochizuki
Incidental Talent Show Song (By Big Valkyrie)
"Princess of December" by Megumi Ogata

== See also ==
- List of UFO Ultramaiden Valkyrie characters
