= List of Samurai Harem: Asu no Yoichi episodes =

The cover of the first Asu no Yoichi! DVD released by Geneon Entertainment on March 25, 2009

The episodes of Samurai Harem: Asu no Yoichi anime are based on the manga of the same name written by Yū Minamoto. The episodes were directed by Rion Kujo and produced by Anime International Company. The general animation director was Ishii Yumiko and Morishima Noriko was the character designer. The screenplay was written by Hideyuki Kurata. Composed by Kikuya Tomoki, the music was produced by Lantis with Jin Aketagawa as the sound director. The plot follows the adventures of a teenage samurai named Yoichi Karasuma as he lives in with the Ikaruga family, after being ordered by his father, to live with them in order to learn more martial arts. As Yoichi struggles to live in the city and starts going to school, he meets students of the Saginomiya clan, martial art rivals to the Ikaruga family and their Ukiha Divine Wind Style Swordplay school of martial arts.

The anime's twelve episodes were broadcast on Tokyo Broadcasting System between January 8, 2009, and March 26, 2009. The anime was broadcast on Sun Television from January 25, 2009, to March 2009. Chubu-Nippon Broadcasting and BS-i both aired the first episode on January 29, 2009. The series used two pieces of theme music. The first opening theme was "Egao no Riyuu" (笑顔の理由) by Meg Rock while its ending theme was "Life and proud" by Aki Misato. Geneon Entertainment released the twelve Asu no Yoichi! episodes in six Region 2 DVD compilations from March 25, 2009, to August 21, 2009.

== Episode list ==
No.	Title	Directed by	Written by	Original release date
1	"A Samurai Comes!"; Transliteration: "Samurai Kuru!" (Japanese: サムライ来る!)	Rion Kujō; Mawari Watanabe	Hideyuki Kurata	January 8, 2009
Yoichi Karasuma has spent 17 years learning the Ukiha Divine Wind Style of swordplay from his father in the mountains. His father has nothing more to teach Yoichi and orders him to experience life in the city with the Ikarugas, who can teach Yoichi new martial arts. Ryo Washizu ridicules Yoichi's samurai clothes in the city, but Yoichi easily defeats him. Ibuki Ikaruga and her sister Kagome wait in the city to pick up Yoichi. He later chases after a thief, causing mayhem in a shopping centre. During the pursuit, Yoichi unknowingly encounters the Ikarugas in embarrassing situations. He successfully stops the thief and returns a lost Kagome to Ibuki. Outside the shopping centre, Ibuki asks him if he is Yoichi, which he acknowledges. The police arrest him for causing mayhem but release him afterwards. Ibuki takes him to her dojo and introduces him to her sisters, Ayame, Chihaya and Kagome.
2	"Welcome to Yokko"; Transliteration: "Yōkoso Yokkō" (Japanese: ようこそ翼高)	Noriaki Akitaya; Hikaru Satō	Hideyuki Kurata	January 15, 2009
Ibuki reads Yoichi's lewd haiku about her and sends him flying into Ayame's room. The two sisters take him to Yokko Private High School, where he is in the same class as Washizu and Ibuki. Ibuki notices Yoichi being questioned by female students, takes him out in the hall, and beats him once again. Washizu, seeking to redeem his reputation, challenges Yoichi to a match with most of the school watching. Yoichi easily defeats him without weapons but catches a fever afterwards. The academic rivalry between Ayame and Ibuki is revealed. Later, Yoichi and Ibuki apologise to each other for their actions earlier in the day, to Ayame's dismay.
3	"Amazing Without Clothes"; Transliteration: "Nui Dara Sugoin Desu" (Japanese: 脱いだらすごいんです)	Yasushi Muroya	Tatsuya Takahashi	January 22, 2009
Tsubasa Tsubame, a clumsy and shy girl, transfers into Ibuki and Yoichi's class. When Yoichi comments on her cuteness, Ibuki quickly beats him. It is revealed that Tsubasa once lived in the mountains, without any luxury, to learn martial arts with her subordinate Angela Takatsukasa. After school, Angela strips Tsubasa's clothes off in front of Ibuki and Yoichi to transform Tsubasa into a skilled martial artist. Tsubasa attacks Yoichi, but Washizu interrupts the fight, covers her with his jacket, and offers to fight Yoichi for her. This pulls Tsubasa out of her stupor, and she flees the scene crying. Later, she tells Angela that she hates her and martial arts; however, they later apologise to each other. The next day, they start working at a restaurant with Tsubasa making deliveries and Angela cooking.
4	"Chihaya Being Chihaya"; Transliteration: "Chihayaburu Chihaya" (Japanese: ちはやぶるちはや)	Kaoru Suzuki	Hideyuki Kurata	January 29, 2009
Chihaya is having trouble finishing her manga in time. Meanwhile, Ibuki and Yoichi demonstrate sword fighting by sparring in front of Ibuki's four students and Ayame. Yoichi accidentally rips Ibuki's clothes with a sword swing, and she punishes him for it. Chihaya decides to interview Yoichi for her manga: she takes Yoichi into her room, shows him her manga, and starts seducing him. Ibuki walks in and beats Yoichi up. He crashes into Kagome and breaks her craft project, and Ibuki beats him up for making Kagome cry. She then orders Yoichi to bring Chihaya, who is at cram school, her notebook. Meanwhile, Yoichi overhears three boys talking about Chihaya behind her back and hinting at having ruined her work. He runs into the classroom and, seeing her with her torn manga draft, beats up the boys.
5	"Let's Go On a Date!"; Transliteration: "Dēto Shiyō Ze!" (Japanese: デートしようぜ!)	Yūta Maruyama	Tatsuya Takahashi	February 5, 2009
Ibuki is afraid that Yoichi will damage the Soaring Wind's reputation because he was invited on a date by Yui Hinagata and takes him on a practice date. They go to a toy shop, where she shows interest in a plushie. Ayame sees the two together and follows them with Chihaya and Kagome. Ibuki goes bowling with Yoichi and attempts to take his hand afterward, but he turns around, and she trips, causing both to fall into a fountain. Yoichi gives Ibuki the plushie and thanks her for the practice date. She remembers that this is not a real date and rushes off to buy drinks, with Chihaya and Kagome watching them behind bushes. Hinagata meets Yoichi near the fountain, and he declines her request for a date; she then fights him with a three section staff. Yoichi ruins Yui's uniform, and she runs away. Ibuki is meanwhile confronted by two men who criticise her for being with Yoichi. Yoichi, Chihaya, and Kagome hear Ibuki's voice and rush to her aid to find that she has defeated her assailants.
6	"Wassan Comes!"; Transliteration: "Wa-san Kuru!" (Japanese: わっさん来る!)	Yōichi Ueda	Hideyuki Kurata	February 12, 2009
Washizu is hit by Ibuki while she chases after Yoichi for looking at naked female sculptures. In the school infirmary, Washizu daydreams about confessing his love to Ibuki and returning her handkerchief by putting a letter into her shoe locker. Washizu acts on his daydream; however, because he put the love letter into the wrong locker, it ends up in Yoichi's hand. Yoichi misinterprets the letter and thinks that Washizu is interested in learning martial arts. Washizu returns Ibuki's handkerchief to her via Yoichi. Meanwhile, an assassin is assigned to kill Yoichi. Keita Torigaya accompanies Washizu to Ibuki's dojo, where they meet her four other students. Ibuki greets them all and assigns Yoichi to teach Washizu. With extra money from Chihaya's manga reprinting, Chihaya and Kagome buy food and drink for the "newcomer". In the dojo, Yoichi hits Washizu with a stick every time his attention wavers from his seiza position. Ibuki makes Yoichi and Washizu perform one thousand push ups in front of the students, with the students and Ibuki counting for them. After both collapse at one thousand push ups, Kagome and Chihaya arrive with dinner, and they eat together. Ibuki feeds Washizu, and Ayame does the same with Yoichi.
7	"School Swimsuit, White School Swimsuit, Two-Piece Swimsuit"; Transliteration: "Sukumizu Shirosuku Sebarēto" (Japanese: スクミズ シロスク セバレート)	Yoriyasu Kogawa	Tatsuya Takahashi	February 19, 2009
The group meet up at an empty beach after winning a lottery ticket. Two brothers, students of the Saginomiya clan, are assigned to defeat Yoichi. One brother releases a trained bird to attack the group, which targets the girls. Yoichi crash-tackles the girls out of harm's way but embarrasses them. Everyone goes into the water to play with the exception of Kagome. When Ibuki questions her, she runs into the forest and Masashi, one of Ibuki's students, follows her. Kagome falls into a cavern and breaks her fall by landing on Masashi. While the rest of the group search for them, Masashi and Kagome rush out an exit only to find out that it leads to a cliff face high above the sea. Masashi falls and manages to grab onto a tree branch but soon relinquishes his grip. The group catches up to Kagome, and Yoichi dives into the water to save him. At that moment, the two brothers greet the group on surfboards, and they challenge Yoichi to fight. Meanwhile, Masashi regroups with the others. With a bokken, Yoichi defeats the brothers with his swordplay. It is revealed that Kagome refuses to participate in water activities because of her embarrassment about her budding breasts, which she continues to bind with cloth.
8	"Back Then, You Were Badass"; Transliteration: "Ano Toki Kimi Ha Waru Katta" (Japanese: あの時君はワルかった)	Noriaki Akitaya	Hideyuki Kurata	February 26, 2009
Washizu is determined to confess to Ibuki about his love letter. He walks into a shop to buy a drink and sees Ayame choosing the same bottle, causing an argument. After training in Ibuki's dojo, Washizu fails to give the love letter to her. Ayame also fails to give Yoichi a towel. Washizu's love letter falls out of his keikogi, and Ayame picks it up. Washizu tears the letter up before she can read it and falls on her. At the same time, Tsubasa is on a ramen delivery run for the dojo and opens the door to see Washizu on Ayame. Tsubasa gets flustered, drops the ramen boxes, and flees. While eating ramen, Yoichi comments on Washizu's mellowness. It is revealed that Washizu has beaten up the toughest high school gang in the area. The gang walks into the dojo and kidnaps Ayame. Threatening to spread revealing photos of her, they beat Washizu up. Yoichi intervenes and with Washizu's help, beat up the members of the gang.
9	"A Summer Festival: Plunging Into the Fire"; Transliteration: "Ton de Hi Ni Iru Natsumatsuri" (Japanese: 飛んで火に入る夏祭り)	Kaoru Suzuki	Tatsuya Takahashi	March 5, 2009
When Yoichi hits Washizu for daydreaming, he runs out of the dojo and shouts his confession to Ibuki, which Ayame overhears and thinks is for her. Upon returning, Washizu is paired with Ayame, and they spar aggressively with bokkens. Torigaya and Washizu make a rigged ballot for a local festival. The groups are: Ayame and Washizu, Yoichi and Ibuki, with Chihaya, Kagome and Torigaya in the final group. During the course of the festival, the Saginomiya clan siblings plot against Yoichi. Yoichi runs to a shooting gallery owned by the Saginomiya clan and futilely tries to win a prize. Ibuki wins the main prize for a family to go to a hot springs with a little help from Sakon Saginomiya, deputy of the Saginomiya clan. At the same time, Ayame constantly hurls abuse at Washizu until he clears up her misunderstanding of his confession. Washizu sees Ibuki and Yoichi in the distance and rushes off with Ibuki to leave Yoichi to Ayame. He finds that the person he rushed off with is actually Tsubasa with a haunted house mask. It is revealed the Saginomiya clan tricked Ibuki into winning the hot springs trip due to clan leader Ukyō Saginomiya's crush on her.
10	"A Battle to the Death at a Hidden Hot Spring!"; Transliteration: "Hitō de Shitō!" (Japanese: 秘湯で死闘!)	Yōichi Ueda	Hideyuki Kurata	March 12, 2009
Yoichi and the group go to a hot springs for free. They eat dinner with their host, who blames the lack of guests on ghosts. Yoichi and Ibuki volunteer to exorcise the ghosts and leave the inn. Immediately after, Ukyō and his sister Sakon release a sleeping gas throughout the inn. Yoichi and Ibuki fall into a hole after arriving at the entrance to a cave and are knocked unconscious. Yoichi wakes up to find Ayame next to him, who starts seducing him. Meanwhile, Ibuki wakes up and sees Ukyō, who tries to rekindle their friendship. Sakon is revealed to be pretending to be Ayame, and she releases a sleeping gas. Ibuki instantly falls asleep, but Yoichi manages to resist the effects of the gas to an extent. Ukyō and his sister take Ibuki away, leaving Yoichi struggling to get back to the inn. He is faced with a series of assailants at the inn and beats all except one. Ayame saves Yoichi, and he defeats the remaining opponent. They find Kagome and Chihaya and wake them up to search for Ibuki together.
11	"I'm Taking Ibuki"; Transliteration: "Ibuki-san Ha Moratta Yo" (Japanese: いぶきさんはもらったよ)	Yoriyasu Kogawa	Hideyuki Kurata	March 19, 2009
Because of the Saginomiya siblings' sleeping gas, Ibuki's mind reverts to when she was four; her clumsiness and refusal to acknowledge Kagome's existence make her a burden to those around her. Ukyō and Sakon arrive at the dojo proposing the Ikarugas a "first-class celebrity" lifestyle in exchange for Ibuki. Meanwhile, Washizu and Torigaya find Ibuki lying face-down in front of her dojo. Washizu buys Ibuki new clothes and plays with her. Ukyō forces Yoichi to learn sword craft with Angela. Meanwhile, the Saginomiyas stun Washizu and kidnap Ibuki. Chihaya and Ayame discover that Kagome is missing and, after a brief search, find her in her room crying and hugging her craft project. This gives the others an initiative to find Ibuki. Yoichi tells Angela to wait for him. He, Ayame, Kagome, and Chihaya leave the dojo in search of Ibuki. Meanwhile, Tsubasa finds Washizu and carries him to a hospital.
12	"Yoichi Fights On!"; Transliteration: "Asu no Yoichi!" (Japanese: あすの与一!)	Rion Kujō	Hideyuki Kurata	March 26, 2009
Yoichi, Kagome, Chihaya, and Ayame arrive at the Saginomiyas' residence and cross the river surrounding the castle using a makeshift raft. Ukyō orders Sakon to chase Yoichi's group away, which she reluctantly accepts. Yoichi's group enter the castle and meet Sakon, who reveals her brother's plan to marry Ibuki. When they refuse to leave, she orders her maids to shoot at them; Yoichi protects his group by blocking the bullets with his bokken. Sakon's use of sleeping gas backfires and causes her maids to fall asleep. Yoichi pleads with her to return Ibuki, but she slaps him and disappears. Yoichi's group encounter more guards, and Washizu, Tsubasa, Angela, and Torigaya intervene. Yoichi, Kagome, Chihaya, and Ayame chase Sakon into the chapel, where Ukyō is preparing his wedding; however, he and Ibuki escape through a hidden platform. Yoichi follows him to the roof, where they fight each other. Ibuki recovers her memory but falls off the roof. Both Yoichi's group and Ukyō attempt to follow, but Sakon holds Ukyō back while Yoichi's group falls into the river. Everyone in Yoichi's group survives the fall. Yoichi sends a letter to his father stating his wishes to stay at the Ikaruga dojo.

== Volume DVDs ==
Geneon Entertainment released six Region 2 DVD compilations, each containing two episodes, between March 25, 2009, and August 21, 2009. Limited editions of all six compilations, each of which contains a bonus CD, were also released.

DVD releases
Volume	Released	Discs	Episodes
1	March 25, 2009	1	2
2	April 24, 2009	1	2
3	May 22, 2009	1	2
4	June 24, 2009	1	2
5	July 24, 2009	1	2
6	August 21, 2009	1	2
