= List of UFO Ultramaiden Valkyrie characters =

The following is a list of characters from UFO Ultramaiden Valkyrie anime series derived from the UFO Princess Valkyrie series of stories that were published in the Japanese manga Monthly Shōnen Gangan. These character descriptions follow the narrative of the North American DVD releases of the anime series.

== Main characters ==
Valkyrie
Voiced by: Hisayo Mochizuki (child), Megumi Ogata (adult) (Japanese); Kira Vincent-Davis (English)
After transferring part of her soul to Kazuto and becoming the small 8-year-old child, Valkyrie became very different than her original self, and even at times refers to herself as "Val". She's extremely childish, fitting her age, and shows a strong interest in hobbies such as TV and manga. Even though she is incredibly attached to Kazuto, she becomes very loud and finds ways to wreck Kazuto's house in her child form. She also gets jealous easily, and often says things that are easily misunderstood by others, such as saying she gave Kazuto her "special thing". This young Valkyrie is always cheerful and has an adoring follower in Sanada, her maid. Valkyrie, in her 8 year old form, also calls Kazuto "Kazie" (in the English dub) which is one of the ways she shows her childlike crush on him, which is stronger in her adult form.
The protagonist of the series and a princess from Planet Valhalla, in the Dolphin Constellation. Once Valkyrie learned that her father was planning a political marriage for her without her consent, she fled to Earth and crash landed on Kazuto's bathhouse. In order to save his life she had to give half of her soul to him, but that process turned her into an 8 year old girl. She can only regain her normal form by kissing Kazuto but it doesn't last long and she normally kisses him in order to protect him. She eventually develops deep feelings of love for Kazuto. Her powers include flight, energy manipulation and defensive shields, plus she gains the Key of Time at the start of the second season, which is capable of a number of things (though before, she already had an object that looked exactly like it). Oddly, early on she's able to use it her child form and adult form, but later only uses it her adult form. When it is later revealed that Kazuto is the one that she will marry, she is overjoyed, but it is difficult for the ceremony to take place since she keeps on reverting to her child form.
At the end of the 3rd season, due to a mishap with the Princess Mural, Valkyrie's older and younger selves split into two separate people. During the 4th season, Valkyrie's former classmates mistake her younger self to be her daughter, until she displays knowledge about them convinces them she really is the younger Valkyrie.
Kazuto Tokino
Voiced by: Kenichi Suzumura (Japanese); Greg Ayres (English)
Kazuto is the owner of a bathhouse which he is trying to run in part to honor his late grandfather who loved the bathhouse. He is one of the few that actually likes the idea as his parents refer to it as a "money pit" and think him a fool to even try to run it. Though somewhat stubborn in running what many believe to be an outdated and failing business, he is considered to be a kind and hard-working soul, which eventually impresses and endears all those around him, including the Valhallan Royal Family. He is nearly killed in Valkyrie's crash landing but saved when she gives him half her soul. He also seems drawn to her in a way and finds himself falling in love with her, but unsure with how to deal with her childlike appearance at times. Eventually, he does see beyond her childlike appearance and loves the Valkyrie within. He plans to marry the princess and eventually is recognized as her official fiance.
Hydra
Voiced by: Chinami Nishimura (Japanese); Nancy Novotny (English)
Hydra is one of the eight princesses of Valhalla, and sees herself as Valkyrie's rival. Hydra followed Valkyrie to earth because she knew that if Valkyrie ran away, she would have to take her place at the wedding, which was not something she wanted to do. Because of that, she chased after her to Earth to bring her back. However, she crash landed on Akina's temple. She initially tries to bring Valkyrie back by force, but that's made impossible when her powers are sealed by Akina in retaliation for crashing into her temple, making her become a child just like Valkyrie. However, unlike Valkyrie, her mind is that of her adult form, not a child's. She still made some attempts to get Valkyrie sent back, but they all failed miserably. Much like a kiss can restore Valkyrie, the seal on Hydra can be released by Akina's will. Hydra has a short temper and is rather tomboyish, acting in a rash manner that shows action before thinking things through, meaning she is prone to destroy things that get in her way. She can transform into a winged pink and yellow horse and has several other powers, such as flying, superhuman strength, and firing powerful energy blasts when she is in adult form. She has taken up kendo while living with Akina, and often pokes fun at Akina's breast size and her feelings for Kazuto, which typically results in Akina hitting her. Due to special circumstances, if she and Akina argue too much, they can fuse into a powerful warrior called Akidra, containing the combined sum of their powers. They can still converse with each other in this state, and the fusion reverses if they become too agreeable with one another.
Sanada
Voiced by: Rie Tanaka (Japanese); Christine Auten (English)
Chief maid of the royal family of Valhalla, the planet Valkyrie original comes from; Ms. Sanada, a cat-girl, is a faithful and very loyal servant. Upon learning of the princess's disappearance, she tracked her down to Kazuto's house where she settled at once, considering Kazuto to be Valkyrie's official fiancé. Even seeing how Valkyrie becomes a smaller version of herself doesn't seem to trouble Ms. Sanada at all as she finds the smaller Valkyrie to be very cute. In fact, Sanada describes her as a 'Valkyrie fundamentalist'. She also fully supports her love interest in Kazuto. In order to ensure her main goal of keeping Valkyrie safe, she sometimes causes more trouble than good. One of these instances is when she uses her "Cat Ear Gun" (Nekomata, or Cat-Girl Ray Gun in the English version) to turn a number of the city's girls into an army of brainwashed catgirl maids for the crime of just being near Kazuto, and when she attempted to also do so to Akina, it led a fight that destroyed much of the city when Hydra got involved. In later episodes, these maids are summoned to aid her by a whistle. When not serving her, they act pretty much like normal, but wearing maid outfits... and Ms. Sanada never sees fit to remove their brainwashing, vexing some fans. Somewhat cruelly, Ms. Sanada doesn't usually remember their names. During the third series, Ms. Sanada takes on a kind of 'superhero identity' to help Valkyrie and Kazuto. Somewhat oddly, Ms. Sanada is hinted to have had a fondness for Valkyrie Ghost.
Akina Nanamura
Voiced by: Saeko Chiba (Japanese); Cynthia Martinez (English)
A neighbor and childhood friend of Kazuto. She has considerable powers with the ability to attack with demon wards and to create barriers. She sealed away Hydra's powers after Hydra crash landed on her family's shrine and started wreaking havoc. She seems to have feelings for Kazuto as she is always stopping at his bathhouse. However, she never acts on these emotions, which she greatly regrets at times, as he and the Princess Valkyrie grow closer together. She later has to face the fact that they are in love and intend to marry. A couple of things to note is that Akina is a horrendous karaoke singer, and that she is quite self-conscious about the size of her chest, and always hits Hydra when she pokes fun at it. In the beginning of the second season, Valkyrie uses the Key of Time to make Akina's breasts grow to an immense size (At Hydra's joke request), which turns out to be a satisfying moment for her, but at the end of the season they go back to normal when Valkyrie reverses all of the actions she performed with the Key of Time. Due to special circumstances, if she and Hydra argue too much, they can fuse into a powerful warrior called Akidra, containing the combined sum of their powers. They can still converse with each other in this state, and the fusion reverses if they become too agreeable with one another.
Rika Tokino
Voiced by: Omi Minami (Japanese); Monica Rial (English)
Kazuto's younger sister, she helps him run the bathhouse but like her parents is concerned it is just a money pit and that they might soon be broke. She tends to act like a scrooge in general when it comes to money and she sees it as quite important, in one instance was even willing to sell Valkyrie away till she found the money offered was fake. She is also constantly studying in the hopes of getting into a good high school and later university. She doesn't seem very interested in having her own social life and even turned down the advances of the most popular boy at her school, though the two later became friends. She is all for the marriage between Valkyrie and Kazuto, since she sees it as a way for the family to get out of debt, (marrying into money so to speak).

== Secondary characters ==
Mar
Voiced by: Haruko Momoi (Japanese); Vic Mignogna (English)
Mar is very short and gets stepped on a lot, but despite this he is actually a hardened warrior. He's involved with the galactic pirates and also has a history with Spot. He's also an ace pilot with the nickname of Thundering Marduke. He was initially sent to kidnap Valkyrie and hold her for ransom, but was later swayed to Spot's side. His appearance almost copies Dengaku Man from Bobobo-bo Bo-bobo except he has a lightning bolt shape on his chest and the bit on his head is longer.
Spot
Voiced by: Tadahisa Saizen (Japanese); Andrew Love (English)
He is called Spottenheim in the English version (or "Shirokenhaimu" in Japanese), though chibi Valkyrie calls him Spot in English ("Shiro" in Japanese). His introduction into the series isn't explained, but he seems to be designated as Valkyrie's pet. He's a white, dog-like alien who happens to be a veteran fighter pilot who was once known as Spottenheim the Comet. He's still skilled, once singlehandedly holding off the fleet around Valhalla during the end of the first season when trying to provide a distraction for Kazuto. He lives at the Tokino residence and does household repairs. Normally, he is the plaything of the child Valkyrie and is tossed, ridden, and swung about like a rag doll. Despite all of the things Valkyrie does to him, he's extremely loyal to her, though he often tells Valkyrie not to pull on his ears. He has a surprisingly deep voice for such a small creature and is also very mature when not acting like Valkyrie's pet.
Chorus
Voiced by: Hoko Kuwashima (Japanese); Kim Prause (English)
She's one of the eight princesses of Valhalla, and she constantly refers to herself as a machine, though Hydra and Laine consider her as just plain nuts; In reality, she's one of those kinds of people who take fiction way too seriously. When she isn't acting crazy, she's actually shown to be very intelligent, though still eccentric, since she likes to sleep in closets. Chorus has been shown to have technopathy, the ability to sync with technology. She makes a cameo in the first series and plays a major role in the second season. Chorus likes to go on the Internet in Rika's closet, much to Rika's annoyance. She has the ability to feel psychic wavelengths (which allowed her to understand the pain Valkyrie Ghost goes through) and can even make them into pictures by using a computer printer. Chorus makes direct references to other anime, and other fictions in general.
Laine
Voiced by: Mayumi Iizuka (Japanese); Hilary Haag (English)
The youngest of the eight princesses of Valhalla, she is basically a ditz and a terrible driver (Though she might be better than Hydra and Valkyrie, as she has yet to total her spaceship, or her ship is more durable). Unlike the other princesses, Laine constantly crashes her UFO, which is a compact, two-parter. She originally came to Earth to seek out Valkyrie due to her intense affection for her, but later develops romantic feelings toward Kazuto. She has the ability to transform her outward appearance into anyone she chooses. However, whatever appearance she takes, she will always have an antenna sticking out of her head, as well as her obvious feminine features, even when imitating a man. Pulling that antennae will immediately change her back. Her disguises aren't perfect, and anyone can figure her out by looking for the antennae, though her perverted personality and large curves usually give her away before that. During the third season, she takes a trip back in time to her academy days and corrects a mistake in her past. Occasionally, her past selves visit her in the present time, though why they haven't created any time paradoxes is anyone's guess.
Mehm
Voiced by: Emi Shinohara (Japanese); Robin Terry (English)
The eldest of the eight Valhallan princess, she is seen as the head of the Royal Family. She's somewhat of a nosy busybody, and she frequently visits the Tokino home, both to check up on Kazuto and Valkyrie's relationship, and to enjoy living away from all her royal duties. She is also known to be sensitive about her age, which is seen when she tells Rika to call her "Big Sister Mehm" instead of "Auntie Mehm". At the end of the first season, it was Mehm who decreed that Valkyrie would marry Kazuto, as she recognized Kazuto to be the only one who could truly understand and love Valkyrie. She possesses the ability to fly and fire beams of energy.
Inarba
Voiced by: Kikuko Inoue (Japanese); Jessica Boone (English)
She's the most serious-minded of the eight Valhallan princesses and stickler for the rules. She made a brief appearance in the first series, and plays a role in the third. She is considered the adjudicator of the Royal Family and has a special attack called the Thrust of Death, which sends anyone to the Punishment Dimension. Everyone fears her, even the violent Hydra. Inarba enforces the Law of Valhalla, and any offenders she meets will suffer the Punishment Dimension, which causes them to live out their greatest fears or some ironic punishment. Laine wasn't affected by it because she didn't pay any attention to what was going on when she was sent there. She comes to Earth to judge the members of the Royal Family and to make preparations for Kazuto and Valkyrie's wedding during the Stellar Season (Celestial Soul's Day in the English dub). So far, only Kazuto's sister was able to counter Inarba's Thrust of Death, in which the impressed Inarba declares Rika to be her eventual successor, though Rika sees the training as just more homework.
Nesty
Voiced by: Yuu Asakawa (Japanese); Kaytha Coker (English)
Another of the eight princesses of Valhalla. She makes a brief appearance in the first series, and is not seen again until the final episode of the third series. Apparently she leads a sort of anti-pirate space fleet and she spends her time hunting down corsairs, criminals and such. She discovers an ancient artifact of Vahalla called the Princess Mural, in which past generations of princesses have had their weddings in front of it. She brings it to Earth so Kazuto and Valkyrie can be married in the same tradition, but that also causes the space pirates to come after it. (In her first appearance one of the characters accidentally calls her Chesty.)
Pharm
Voiced by: Mai Kadowaki (Japanese); Carli Mosier (English)
Like the other princesses, she only makes a momentary appearance at the end of the first season, but later shows up in the third. She crash-lands her UFO on top of Kazuto and Akina's high school (and ironically didn't cause any damage to it) and sets herself up as their homeroom teacher. Pharm has a fetish for women wearing large spectacles like the one she has on. She begins converting the girls at school wearing large eyeglasses, and comes into conflict with Ms. Sanada and the Cat-Girl Maid Squad. She later reveals that she wanted to see Valkyrie wear them.
Valkyrie Ghost
Voiced by: Megumi Ogata (Japanese); Kira Vincent-Davis (English)
The main antagonist during the second season. In a contrast to the rest of the cast in the series, she's a dark and uncomical character. She is not a single individual person, but rather the combined energies and emotions of the four missing Princesses of Valhalla from ancient times that saved Valhalla from the destructive Blizzard of Time. She resembles Valkyrie in her adult form, but wears black clothes, and has purple eyes, which in her fighting form turn red. She chose the name Valkyrie Ghost since she resembles Valkyrie. Valkyrie Ghost is searching for the legendary Illustrious Lover (Phantom Lover in the dub) of myth in hopes that she could cure her eternal sadness and loneliness. She finds him in Kazuto after feeling the absolute joy and happiness in Valkyrie. While at heart she simply wants to be released from her pain and has no malevolent intentions, she's very ruthless and has no problems hurting or killing anyone that gets in her way, once nearly killing Hydra. The missing four princesses are also the creators of Valkyrie's Key of Time, and she poses the ability to control it even when it isn't in her hand. Similar to Valkyrie, she transforms into a fighting form by kissing Kazuto. She can fly, but mostly fights by firing blasts of energy and can create force-fields. Her strongest attack consists of her bringing the eyes on her costume together and firing a combined stream of energy. She spends some time initially trying to win Kazuto's heart, and then kidnaps him when she feels she succeeded (though he didn't resist). She apparently can't be killed by fighting, since even when she was defeated by Akidra she still couldn't die. She was only stopped when Valkyrie used the Key of Time to release the emotions and energy that made up her form.
Akidra
Voiced by: Chinami Nishimura and Saeko Chiba (Japanese); Nancy Novotny and Cynthia Martinez (English)
This is the combined form of Akina and Hydra. When Akina began experimenting with some new incantations to fight against Valkyrie Ghost, she and Hydra are fused together during an argument. The end result is a white-haired shrine maiden with the powers of a Valhallan princess with mystic seals, who possess both the powers of Akina and Hydra, and has the two of them sharing the same body. Their combined abilities are magnified, enough so that could even defeat Valkyrie Ghost, but there are two drawbacks. In order to combine, Hydra and Akina must be in a state of disagreement, then touch hands. Normally, this is achieved whenever one of them does something to anger the other, usually Akina rattles Hydra by destroying some of Hydra's personal things. They once accidentally fuse during the third season because of an argument. Secondly, if the two are in agreement about anything (even something like not being able to agree on anything), they automatically separate. This condition makes it very difficult for them to cooperate during combat. That said, Akidra is a very effective combatant, managing to defeat Valkyrie Ghost on two occasions (who was more than a match for Akina and Hydra when they first fought her).

=== Cat-Girl Maid Squad ===
Keiko Sonoda, Aiko Wakitani, Yuko Oose, and Eiko Andou
Voiced by: Haruko Momoi, Mai Nakahara, Ren Hisa, and Nanae Kato (Japanese); Allison Sumrall, Luci Christian, Kelly Manison, and Tiffany Grant (English)
Four girls transformed into cat-girls by Ms. Sanada. They are the more prominent Cat-Girl Maid Squad at the Tokino Bathhouse and are the ones that are seen the most in the series. Before at last memorizing their names at least, Sanada referred to them as A, B, C and D. They are quick to denounce their fellow transformed cat girls when the rest are recruited into a rival princess' brainwashed cult of glasses wearing devotees much to Ms. Sanada's pride and chibi Hydra at the time makes an under the breath comment on Ms. Sanada's hypocrisy (only time in the series it's ever touched by the writers).

== See also ==
- List of UFO Ultramaiden Valkyrie episodes
