= Mai Nakahara =

Japanese voice actress and singer (born 1981)

- 中原 麻衣
- Born: February 23, 1981 (age 45); Akashi, Hyōgo, Japan
- Occupations: Voice actress; singer
- Years active: 2001–present
- Agent: I'm Enterprise
- Notable work: Clannad as Nagisa Furukawa; Higurashi When They Cry as Rena Ryūgū; Tales of Vesperia as Estellise Sidos Heurassein
- Height: 161.5 cm (5 ft 4 in)
- Musical career
- Genres: J-Pop; Anison
- Instrument: Vocals
- Years active: 2002–present
- Label: Lantis

Mai Nakahara (中原 麻衣, Nakahara Mai; born February 23, 1981) is a Japanese voice actress and singer associated with I'm Enterprise. She played Rena Ryūgū in Higurashi When They Cry, Nagisa Furukawa in Clannad, Seele Vollerei in Honkai Impact 3rd, Seele in Honkai: Star Rail, and Akagi in Azur Lane. She performed theme songs for each series, some of which have charted on Oricon.

== Filmography ==
=== Television ===
List of voice performances in anime
Year	Title	Role	Notes	Source
2002	Seven of Seven	Nanasama		
2002–05	Mirmo! series	Kaede Minami		
2002–03	UFO Ultramaiden Valkyrie	Aiko Wakiya	Also specials	
2002	Spiral: The Bonds of Reasoning	Sayoko Shiranagatani		
2002	Gravion	Eina		
2003	Mouse	Kakio Hazuki		
2003	.hack//Legend of the Twilight	Rena Kunisaki		
2003–06	Kaleido Star	May Wong	Also OVA specials	
2003	Wandaba Style	Himawari Natsuwa		
2003	The Mythical Detective Loki Ragnarok	Skuld		
2003	Please Twins!	Miina Miyafuji		
2003–04	Godannar	Anna Aoi	2 seasons	
2003	Maburaho	Chihaya Yamase		
2004	Daphne in the Brilliant Blue	Maia Mizuki		
2004	Midori Days	Midori Kasugano		
2004	DearS	Miu		
2004	My-HiME	Mai Tokiha		
2004	Gankutsuou	Peppo		
2005–06	Ah My Buddha	Chitose Nanbu	2 seasons	
2005	Happy Seven	Sarasugawa Kiku		
2005–09	My-Otome series	Mai Tokiha		
2005	Noein	Yukie Nijou		
2006	Magikano	Maika Yoshikawa		
2006	Tactical Roar	Nanaha Misaki		
2006	Strawberry Panic!	Nagisa Aoi		
2006	Kage Kara Mamoru!	Yūna Konnyaku		
2006	Utawarerumono	Yuzuha		
2006–21	Higurashi When They Cry	Rena Ryūgū		
2007–09	Clannad	Nagisa Furukawa	including Clannad After Story	
2006	Tsuyokiss Cool × Sweet	Erika Kiriya		
2006	Baldr Force EXE Resolution	Minori Segawa	OVA, different from game and anime	
2006	Lovely Idol	Kotoha Kiryū		
2006	The Wallflower	Noi Kasahara		
2007	Magical Girl Lyrical Nanoha StrikerS	Teana Lanster		
2007	Idolmaster Xenoglossia	Ritsuko Akizuki		
2007	Kamichama Karin	Karin Hanazono		
2007	Sola	Aono Morimiya		
2007	Bamboo Blade	Reimi Odajima		
2007	Myself ; Yourself	Asami Hoshino		
2007	KimiKiss: Pure Rouge	Megumi Kuryū		
2008–22	夢想夏郷, 東方 (Touhou Musou Kakyou / A Summer Day's Dream)	Reimu Hakurei		
2008	Persona: Trinity Soul	Kanaru Morimoto		
2008	Spice and Wolf	Nora Arendt		
2008	Blassreiter	Snow		
2008	Vampire Knight	Maria Kurenai	2 seasons	
2008	Kannagi: Crazy Shrine Maidens	Shino Ōkouchi		
2009	The Girl Who Leapt Through Space	Kagura Shishido		
2009	Chrome Shelled Regios	Felli Loss		
2009–12	Saki series	Teru Miyanaga		
2009	Guin Saga	Rinda Farseer		
2009	Tears to Tiara	Morgan		
2009	Sweet Blue Flowers	Kuri Sugimoto		
2009	Taishō Baseball Girls	Akiko Ogasawara		
2010–19	Fairy Tail	Juvia Lockser		
2010	Ladies versus Butlers!	Selenia Iori Flameheart		
2010–16	Durarara!! series	Haruna Niekawa		
2010–12	Hidamari Sketch series	Arisawa	Hoshimittsu and Honeycomb	
2010	The Qwaser of Stigmata	Eva-Q		
2010	Katanagatari	Nanami Yasuri		
2010–11	Metal Fight Beyblade	Mei-Mei	Seasons 2 and 3	
2010	Shimajirō Hesoka	Pyonko-chan 5's older grandfather		
2010	Stitch! Zutto Saiko no Tomodachi	Mrs. Sickly		
2010	Tantei Opera Milky Holmes	Mary		
2010	Otome Yōkai Zakuro	Zakuro		
2011	Pretty Rhythm: Aurora Dream	Nana Ichijo		
2011	Aria the Scarlet Ammo	Yutori Takamagahara	Also AA in 2015	
2011–12	Horizon in the Middle of Nowhere	Musashi		
2012	Sengoku Collection	Pure Angel Naoe Kanetsugu		
2012–13	AKB0048	Sae Miyazawa the 10th	2 seasons	
2012	Humanity Has Declined	I (The Heroine)		
2012	Muv-Luv Alternative: Total Eclipse	Yui Takamura		
2013	Cyclops Shōjo Saipu	Fūka Saitō	original net animation	
2013–20	My Teen Romantic Comedy SNAFU	Haruno Yukinoshita		
2013	Photo Kano	Aki Muroto		
2013–16	A Simple Thinking About Blood Type	Type AB-chan		
2014	Monthly Girls' Nozaki-kun	Yu Kashima		
2013	Muromi-san	Levia-san		
2013	Servant × Service	Saya Miyoshi		
2013	The Eccentric Family	Yashirō Shimogamo		
2013–14	Strike the Blood	Nina Adelard		
2014	The Irregular at Magic High School	Suzune Ichihara		
2014	One Week Friends	Shiho Fujimiya		
2014	Mekaku City Actors	Ayano (Ayano Tateyama)		
2014	Rail Wars!	Hitomi Gonō		
2014	Bladedance of Elementalers	Greyworth Ciel Mais		
2014	Gundam Reconguista in G	Barara Peor		
2014	Wolf Girl and Black Prince	Reika Sata		
2014–15	Shirobako	Yuka Okitsu, Mei Nakahara		
2015	Saekano: How to Raise a Boring Girlfriend	Sayuri Sawamura		
2015	The Rolling Girls	Misa Ichijō		
2015	Comical Psychosomatic Medicine	Female judo players	Original net animation	
2015	Magical Girl Lyrical Nanoha Vivid	Teana Lanster, Megane Arpino		
2015	Yamada-kun and the Seven Witches	Karen Kirishima	OAD and TV series	
2015	Rampo Kitan: Game of Laplace	Hanabishi		
2015	Charlotte	Yumi Shirayanagi		
2015–16	The Asterisk War	Haruka Amagiri	2 seasons	
2016	Ragnastrike Angels	Rio Hiiragi		
2016	Sailor Moon Crystal	Reika Nishimura	Death Busters arc	
2016	High School Fleet	Mashimo Munetani		
2016	Haven't You Heard? I'm Sakamoto	Megumi Fujita		
2016	RS Project -Rebirth Storage-	Yuki Mishima		
2016	Thunderbolt Fantasy	Dān Fěi	puppetry	
2016	Danganronpa 3: The End of Hope's Peak High School	Chisa Yukizome		
2016	Udon no Kuni no Kin-iro Kemari	Rinko Oishi		
2017	Fuuka	Manager Yamada		
2017	Thus Spoke Kishibe Rohan	Kyōka Izumi	first OVA episode	
2017	Fate/Apocrypha	Reika Rikudou		
2018	Aikatsu Friends!	Tamaki Enjōji		
2018	Cells at Work!	Staphylococcus aureus		
2019	Cop Craft	Jamie Austin		
2019	Do You Love Your Mom and Her Two-Hit Multi-Target Attacks?	Medhimama		
2019	High School Prodigies Have It Easy Even In Another World	Winona		
2019	Azur Lane	Akagi		
2020	Magia Record: Puella Magi Madoka Magica Side Story	Mifuyu Azusa		
2020	Super HxEros	Shokuchuu		
2020	Re:Zero − Starting Life in Another World	Sekhmet		
2020	Talentless Nana	Michiru Inukai, Nanao Nakajima (young)		
2021	Tropical-Rouge! Pretty Cure	Aunete/Cure Oasis		
2021–22	Shadows House	Maryrose/Rosemary		
2021	The Honor Student at Magic High School	Suzune Ichihara		
2021	Platinum End	Mirai's Mother		
2021	Kaginado	Nagisa Furukawa		
2022	Fantasia Sango - Realm of Legends	Shunkyō		
2022	Birdie Wing: Golf Girls' Story	Kinue Jinguji		
2022	The Yakuza's Guide to Babysitting	Miyuki Sakuragi		
2022	Boruto: Naruto Next Generations	Hana Kaka		
2022	I've Somehow Gotten Stronger When I Improved My Farm-Related Skills	Luccia Wayne		
2022	The Eminence in Shadow	Cid's Mother		
2023	Chillin' in My 30s After Getting Fired from the Demon King's Army	Droyes		
2023	Giant Beasts of Ars	Baban's wife		
2023	Is It Wrong to Try to Pick Up Girls in a Dungeon? IV	Astraea		
2023	I Got a Cheat Skill in Another World and Became Unrivaled in the Real World, Too	Rin Kanzaki		
2023	Saint Cecilia and Pastor Lawrence	Rebecca		
2023	A Girl & Her Guard Dog	Kaori Sekiya		
2024	Tsukimichi: Moonlit Fantasy 2nd Season	Lily Front Gritonia		
2024	'Tis Time for "Torture," Princess	Lulune		
2024	Spice and Wolf: Merchant Meets the Wise Wolf	Norah Arendt		
2024	The Duke of Death and His Maid 3rd Season	Liz		
2024	Senpai Is an Otokonoko	Mika Hanaoka		
2024	No Longer Allowed in Another World	Isha		
2024	The Magical Girl and the Evil Lieutenant Used to Be Archenemies	Byakuya Mimori		
2024	Wonderful Pretty Cure!	Zakuro		
2024	Tower of God 2nd Season	Sophia Amae		
2024	Dragon Ball Daima	Mini Bulma		
2025	Hero Without a Class: Who Even Needs Skills?!	Farah		
2025	Reincarnated as the Daughter of the Legendary Hero and the Queen of Spirits	Origin		
2026	Yowayowa Sensei	Akemi Abikura		
2026	Mission: Yozakura Family 2nd Season	Itsuwa Yozakura		
2026	The Ghost in the Shell	Kusanagi's Friend (Short Hair)		
2026	Though I Am an Inept Villainess	Kin Seika		

=== Film ===
List of voice performances in feature films
Year	Title	Role	Notes	Source
2015	Arpeggio of Blue Steel: Ars Nova Cadenza	Yamato		
2015	Aria the Avvenire	Azusa B. McLaren		
2015	Girls und Panzer der Film	Rumi		
2020	Shirobako: The Movie	Yuka Okitsu		

=== Video games ===
List of voice performances in video games
Year	Title	Role	Notes	Source
2002	La Pucelle: Tactics	Prier	PS2, also Ragnarok in 2009	
2003	Disgaea: Hour of Darkness	Prier	PS1/PS2, from La Pucelle: Tactics	
2004	Symphonic Rain	Tortinita Fine, Arietta Fine		
2004	Clannad	Nagisa Furukawa	PC, ported to various consoles	
2004	DearS	Miu	PS2	
2005–06	My-Hime games	Mai Tokiha		
2005	Lucky Star: Moe Drill	Tsukasa Hiiragi	NDS, also a sequel in 2007	
2006	Yggdra Union: We'll Never Fight Alone	Yggdra, Luciana (Blaze), Aegina (Gloria)	Multiple platforms, Also Blaze, Gloria	
2006	Gunparade March games	Nami Komi	PS1/PS2	
2006	KimiKiss	Megumi Kuryū	PS1/PS2	
2006	Strawberry Panic	Nagisa Aoi	PS1/PS2	
2006	Utawarerumono games	Yuzuha	PS1/PS2, also Portable in 2009	
2007	Soul Nomad & the World Eaters	Tricia	PS2	
2007	Sonic and the Secret Rings	Shahra	Wii	
2007–15	Higurashi When They Cry games	Rena Ryūgū		
2007	Binchō-tan	Yukari-tan	PS1/PS2	
2007	Myself; Yourself	Asami Hoshino	PS1/PS2, also Finale in 2009	
2008	Disgaea 3	Prier	PS3, hidden boss, from La Pucelle: Tactics	
2008	Poison Pink	Ashley	PS2	
2008–09	Tears to Tiara	Morgan	PS3, also Secret of Avalon	
2008	Tales of Vesperia	Estellise Sidos Heurassein	X360, PS3 in 2009	
2009	Legends of the Dark King: A Fist of the North Star Story: Ten no Hao	Reina	PSP	
2009	Tales of the World: Radiant Mythology 2	Estellise Sidos Heurassein	PSP, from Vesperia	
2009–10	11eyes CrossOver	Shione Azuma		
2009	Spice and Wolf	Nora Arendt	DS	
2009	Taishō Baseball Girls	Akiko Ogasawara	PSP	
2009	Luminous Arc 3	Valeria	DS	
2010–15	Photo Kano games	Aki Muroto	Also Kiss and Ebikore	
2010	Prinny 2	Prier	PSP	
2010	Marriage Royale: Prism Story	Komachi Akita	PSP	
2011	Gal*Gun	General female student, Miko Kuroda (PS3 version)	Xbox 360, PS3 in 2012	
2011	Tales of the World: Radiant Mythology 3	Estellise	PSP, from Vesperia	
2011	Queen's Gate: Spiral Chaos	Maron Makaron	PSP	
2012	Aquapazza: Aquaplus Dream Match	Morgan	PS3, from Tears to Tiara	
2012	Project X Zone	Estellise	3DS, from Tales of Vesperia	
2013	Horizon in the Middle of Nowhere	Musashi	PSP	
2013	Muv-Luv Alternative Total Eclipse	Yui Takamura	Multiple platforms	
2013	Saki Achiga-hen episode of Side-A Portable	Teru Miyanaga	PSP	
2014	Super Heroine Chronicle	Rena Ryugu	from Higurashi, multiple platforms	
2014	Granblue Fantasy	Gayne and Europa	Mobile / Browser / PC	
2014	Tales of the World: Reve Unitia	Estellise	DS, from Vesperia	
2014	The Irregular at Magic High School: Out of Order	Suzune Ichihara		
2015	Project X Zone 2: Brave New World	Estellise	3DS	
2016	The King of Fighters XIV	Nakoruru	PC/PS4	
2016	Girls' Frontline	9A-91	Android, iOS	
2017	Azur Lane	Akagi	Android, iOS	
2018	Magia Record	Mifuyu Azusa	Android, iOS	
2018	Sdorica	Fatima Eaglefeather, Fatima SP, Hestia, Hestia SP	Android, iOS	
2018	SNK Heroines: Tag Team Frenzy	Nakoruru	Arcade/PS4/Switch/	
2019	The King of Fighters All Star	Nakoruru	Android, iOS	
2019	Samurai Shodown	Nakoruru	PC/PS4/Switch/Xbox One	
2019	Another Eden	Mana	Mobile/Switch	
2019	Dragalia Lost	Rena	Android, iOS	
2019	Honkai Impact 3rd	Seele Vollerei, "Seele"	PC, Android, iOS	
2019	Arknights	Blaze	Android, iOS	
2020	Shin Megami Tensei III: Nocturne HD Remaster	Lady of the Fount	PC/PS4/Switch	
2020	World's End Club	Pai	iOS, Switch	
2020	Arena of Valor	Tel'Annas (Dimensional Break Skin)	Android, iOS	
2022	Hyperdimension Neptunia: Sisters vs. Sisters	Higurashi When They Cry	PS4/PS5	
2022	Blue Archive	Hiyori Tsuchinaga	Android, iOS	
2022	The King of Fighters XV	Nakoruru		
2023	A Certain Magical Index: Imaginary Fest	Yuītsu Kihara	Android, iOS	
2023	Honkai: Star Rail	Seele	PC/iOS/Android	
2024	Touhou Spell Carnival	Reimu Hakurei	PS4/PS5/Switch	
2025	Wuthering Waves	Cantarella	PC/iOS/Android	

=== Dubbing ===
List of dubbing performances
Title	Role	Voice dub	Notes	Refs
All the Boys Love Mandy Lane	Chloe	Whitney Able		
Best Friends Whenever	Shelby Marcus	Lauren Taylor	Disney Channel series	TV
A Better Tomorrow	Jackie	Emily Chu	2013 Blu-ray edition	
The Bronze	Hope Ann Greggory	Melissa Rauch		
Crazy Rich Asians	Rachel Chu	Constance Wu		
Hardcore Henry	Estelle	Haley Bennett		
Keeping Up with the Joneses	Karen Gaffney	Isla Fisher		
The Magician	Bo-eum	Jo Yoon-hee		
The Mermaid	Ruolan	Zhang Yuqi		
Scream Queens	Libby Putney / Chanel #5	Abigail Breslin		
She-Ra and the Princesses of Power	Adora/She-Ra	Aimee Carrero	Netflix	
Tai Chi 0	Claire Heathrow	Mandy Lieu		
Why Him?	Stephanie Fleming	Zoey Deutch		
The Young Master	Sang Kung's Daughter	Lily Li		

List of other dubbing performances
Title	Role	Notes	Refs
Usotsuki Lily	Komachi Ashiya	Vomic	

=== Other ===
List of live-action performances
Title	Role	Notes	Refs
Kamisama Kiss stage musical	Kotake		

=== Drama CDs ===
List of drama CD performances
Year	Title	Role	Notes	Refs
2005–12	Higurashi When They Cry series	Rena Ryugu		
2005–13	Drama CD Lucky Star	Tsukasa Hiiragi	seven dramas (August 24, 2005 – June 10, 2013)	
2006	Mai-Otome Drama CD	Mai Tokiha		
2007	Lovely Idol Drama CD	Kiryu Kotoha		
2007	Clannad	Nagisa Furukawa	three dramas (April 25, 2007 – June 22, 2007)	
2007	Idolmaster: Xenoglossia	Risuko Akitsuki	three dramas (June 6, 2007 – November 7, 2007)	
2009–10	Ebiten	Hakata Kanamori	2 dramas	
	Nekogami Yaoyorozu	Yuzu Komiya		
	Blood Alone	Misaki Minato	4 dramas	

== Discography ==
=== Studio albums ===
List of albums, with selected chart positions
Title	Release Date	Oricon	
Title	Release Date	Peak position	Weeks charted
Homework	February 4, 2004	–	–
Mini Theater	May 11, 2005	–	–
Fantasia	September 27, 2006	137	1
Metronome Egg	June 25, 2008	177	1
Suisei Script	September 22, 2010	270	1

=== Singles ===
List of singles, with selected chart positions
Title	Year	Oricon		Album
Title	Year	Peak position	Weeks charted	Album
"Mirumodepon! Pretty Cake Magic" (ミルモでポン! プリティ・ケーキ・マジック); Kaede+Cheek Fairy	2002	–	–	–
"Happy Lucky ~ Onegai, Mirumo" (ハッピー ラッキー～お願い、ミルモ!～); Kaede Chan (Mai Nakahara)	2003	–	–	–
"Romance" (ロマンス)	2004	–	–	Mini Theater
"Etude" (エチュード)	2005	–	–	–
"Futaribocchi" / "Monochrome" (ふたりぼっち / モノクローム)	2006	77	2	Metronome Egg
"Wish Star ni Nare" / "LoveLoveLove no Sei na no yo! (Kotoha solo version)" (WISH STARにな・あ・れ/LoveLoveLoveのせいなのよ!(琴葉ソロヴァージョン)); Kotoha Kiryū (Mai Nakahara)	2006	109	1	–
"Anemone" (アネモネ)	2007	67	1	Metronome Egg
"Sweet Madrigal"	2009	93	2	Suisei Script
"my starry boy"	2010	103	1	Suisei Script
