= Ritsuko Okazaki =

Ritsuko Okazaki 岡崎 律子
- Okazaki on the cover of her album Love & Life (2005)

Background information
- Also known as: Ritz
- Born: December 29, 1959; Takashima, Nagasaki, Japan
- Died: May 5, 2004 (aged 44) Tokyo, Japan
- Genres: Pop
- Occupations: Singer-songwriter; lyricist
- Instruments: Vocals; piano
- Years active: 1993–2004
- Label: Starchild
- Formerly of: Melocure

Ritsuko Okazaki (岡崎 律子, Okazaki Ritsuko; December 29, 1959 – May 5, 2004) was a Japanese singer-songwriter born on Hashima Island, Nagasaki Prefecture. She first made her professional debut with the single, Kanashii Jiyū / Koi ga, Kiete Yuku. She is also known as the Shelby Flint of Japan.

== Biography ==
=== Early life ===
Okazaki was born in Hashima Island, Nagasaki Prefecture on December 29, 1959. She was born left-handed. During her childhood, she was forced by her mother to use her right hand. However, after hearing that it was bad to force her to use her right hand, her mother quickly advised her to use her natural hand. During her school days, she spent time in the bakery where she worked part-time, and practiced with her band, Eleanor. She was then in charge of the chorus and piano.

=== Career ===
Okazaki made her debut as a singer-songwriter in 1993. During the nineties, she continued singing and also wrote songs for various voice actors. As she became more involved with anime she composed songs for Wedding Peach, Fruits Basket, Princess Tutu, Symphonic Rain, and Love Hina. She formed the duo Melocure in 2002 with singer-songwriter Megumi Hinata.

In the following two years, the duo released several singles and an album, Melodic Hard Cure. Okazaki also produced songs during these years for artists such as Megumi Hayashibara, Mayumi Iizuka, and Yui Horie. According to her fans, the lyrics of Okazaki's songs are characterized by poetic imagery, depth of emotion, gentle optimism and simplicity.

=== Death ===
She was diagnosed with stomach cancer in 2003 but still continued with her work. During this time there was little information released about her. The news was revealed to the public in the liner notes of the CD soundtrack re-release of the visual novel Symphonic Rain, which was released a year after her death.

On May 5, 2004, Okazaki died suddenly at the age of 44 from septic shock as a result of sepsis. She was unable to speak any last words, and left her work unfinished.

== Discography ==
=== Singles ===
Title	Release date	Notes
Kanashii Jiyū / Koi ga, Kiete Yuku (悲しい自由 / 恋が、消えてゆく; Sad Freedom / Love has Disappeared)	March 3, 1993	
Sai'ai / Jūnigatsu no Yuki no Hi (最愛 / 12 月の雪の日; Beloved / The Snowy Day of December)	February 23, 1994	
Chōkyori Denwa / Girlfriend (長距離電話 / Girlfriend; Long Distance Call / Girlfriend)	September 15, 1994	
Riguretto ~Koibito Nara~ / Shigatsu no Yuki (リグレット～恋人なら～ / ４月の雪; Regret ~If as Lovers~ / The Snow in April)	April 25, 1996	
A Happy Life / Hamingu (A Happy Life / ～ハミング～; A Happy Life / Humming)	August 25, 1996	"A Happy Life" sung by Megumi Hayashibara as the opening theme for Gakuen Utopia Manabi Straight!.
Rain or Shine -Futte mo Harete mo- / White Land (Rain or Shine －降っても晴れても－ / White Land)	October 25, 1997	
L'aquoiboniste (Muzōsa Shinshi) / Moonshadow (L'aquoiboniste (無造作紳士) / Moonshadow; L'aquoiboniste (Trouble-free Gentleman) / Moon Shadow)	December 8, 1999	Japanese cover of "L'aquoiboniste" by Jane Birkin
For Furutsū Basuketto / Chiisana Inori (For フルーツバスケット / 小さな祈り; For Fruits Basket / A Small Prayer)	July 25, 2001	The opening and ending themes for Natsuki Takaya's anime adaptation, Fruits Basket.
Morning Grace	October 23, 2002	The opening and ending themes for Princess Tutu.
Friendship ~For Suki-tte Ii na yo~ (Friendship ~for 好きっていいなよ。; Friendship ~for Say I Love You.)	November 2012	Opening song for anime Suki-tte Ii na yo.

=== Albums ===
Title	Release date	Notes
Sincerely yours	March 24, 1993	
Joyful Calendar	March 23, 1994	
A Happy Life	May 25, 1996	
Ritzberry Fields	August 21, 1997	
Rain or Shine	October 25, 1997	
Ohayō (おはよう; Good Morning)	November 6, 1998	
Love Hina Okazaki Collection	December 15, 2001	
Love Hina Self Cover Album	December 16, 2001	
Life is lovely.	February 5, 2003	
Sister Princess RePure Twelve Angels 12 Characters Ending Songs	February 5, 2003	
For Ritz	December 29, 2004	Contains Okazaki's cover of the songs from Symphonic Rain.
Love & Life: private works 1999–2001	May 5, 2005	Includes songs from 3 promotional CDs previously exclusive for her fan club members.

== See also ==
- Music of Fruits Basket
- Sakura Saku
