= Megumi Hinata =

- Also known as: Gumi; Meg Rock; Mgrck; Meg Hinata; G.E.M.
- Born: 1978 or 1979 (age 46–47)
- Origin: Japan
- Genres: J-pop; anison; pop rock
- Occupations: Singer, songwriter
- Instruments: Vocals, piano
- Years active: 1998–present
- Labels: Honeyboot Records, Mellow Head
- Member of: Melocure
- Website: www.megrock.com

Megumi Hinata (日向めぐみ, Hinata Megumi), also credited as Gumi and Meg Rock, is a Japanese singer, lyricist, composer and musician.

== Biography ==
Megumi Hinata began learning to play the piano at the age of four, and said she first became interested in music in the latter half of elementary school, which she spent in the United States. After returning to Japan, she began writing lyrics and music, and participated in band activities at school.

Hinata is considerably fluent in English. Her lyrics often contain whole verses or choruses in English, and she has even written a few songs entirely in English. She has also translated lyrics for other artists from English to Japanese as well as from Japanese to English.

== Career ==
Throughout her career, she has operated under several names. Under the direction of Kohmi Hirose, Megumi Hinata had her singing debut in 1998 as GUMI (グミ) and sang the theme song and several insert songs for Cardcaptor Sakura. She then changed her solo stage name to meg rock in 2004.

In addition to her solo career, she had a side project with Akimitsu Honma from 2000 to 2001 called g.e.m., and another with Ritsuko Okazaki started in April 2002 called Melocure, which ended abruptly due to Okazaki's death in 2004. Melocure created music for a number of anime series including UFO Ultramaiden Valkyrie, Stratos 4, and Oku-sama wa Mahō Shōjo: Bewitched Agnes.

As a producer and lyricist, she is known either as meg rock, meg hinata or Megumi Hinata. She has produced songs for a great number of singers, notably including Chieko Kawabe, Nami Tamaki, and Shoko Nakagawa.

== Discography ==
=== Singles ===
==== As lead artist ====
Title	Year	Album	Notes	Ref
"Catch You Catch Me"	1998	Cardcaptor Sakura OST	As GUMI	
"c/w you."	2000	g.e.m.	As g.e.m.	
"Baby Low Tension (ベビーローテンション)"	2005	Peach Girl OST	As meg rock	
"clover"	2005	SoltyRei OST	As meg rock	
"incl."	2006	Joshikōsei GIRL'S HIGH OST	As meg rock	
"Kimi no Koto (君のこと)"	2008		As meg rock	
"Egao no Riyū (笑顔の理由)"	2009	Asu no Yoichi! OST	As meg rock	

==== As a featured artist ====
Title	Year	Album	Notes	Ref
"GO THE DISTANCE"	2003	DAY BY DAY	With MI:LAGRO	
"PEACE WITHIN THE BRIGHTNESS"	2003	Hohoe Muchikara	With MI:LAGRO	

==== Soundtrack appearances ====
Title	Year	Album	Notes	Ref
"HITORIJIME" (ヒトリジメ)	1998	Cardcaptor Sakura OST	As GUMI	
"picnic"	1998	Cardcaptor Sakura OST	As GUMI	
"super duper love love days"	1998	Cardcaptor Sakura OST	As GUMI	
"Itoshii Kakera (愛しいかけら)"	2002	UFO Ultramaiden Valkyrie OST	As part of Melocure	
"1st Priority"	2003	Stratos 4 OST	As part of Melocure	
"Meguriai (めぐり逢い)"	2003	UFO Ultramaiden Valkyrie OST	As part of Melocure	
"Chiisa na Uta"	2003	UFO Ultramaiden Valkyrie OST	As Meg Hinata	
"Natsu no Mukōgawa (夏の向こう側)"	2005		Third season opening theme to UFO Ultramaiden Valkyrie	
"Home & Away (ホーム&アウェイ)"	2005	Home & Away/Jewelry	Opening theme to Okusama ha Mahō Shōjo; A-side to Kikuko Inoue's "Jewelry"	

=== Albums ===
Album	Notes	Ref
g.e.m.		
Melodic Hard Cure (メロディック・ハード・キュア)	As part of Melocure	
Loveboat (ラブボ)	As meg rock	
mighty roller coaster	As meg rock	
slight fever	As meg rock	

=== Production and songwriting credits ===
Title	Year	Artist	Album	Composer	Lyricist	Ref
"Sweet Darling"	1999	Masaharu Fukuyama	Rendezvous 1 / "Perfect Love!"	No	Yes	
"Kimi wo Sagashiteru"	2002	Omi Minami	UFO Ultramaiden Valkyrie OST	No	Yes	
"Marble"	2002	Hisayo Mochizuki	UFO Ultramaiden Valkyrie OST	No	Yes	
"STAR WORDS"	2002	Hisayo Mochizuki	UFO Ultramaiden Valkyrie OST	No	Yes	
"Watashitachi no Miracle"	2002	Hisayo Mochizuki	UFO Ultramaiden Valkyrie OST	No	Yes	
"Save♥"	2002	Hisayo Mochizuki	UFO Ultramaiden Valkyrie OST	No	Yes	
"Ichigoichie"	2003	3B Lab	LABORATORY No. 1	No	Yes	
-	2004	3B Lab	"HEARTBREAK#2"	No	Yes	
Zenryaku, Ogenki Desu ka? Saihate no Chi Yori Na mo Naki Kimi ni Ai wo Komete	2004	Kyo	Non-album single	No	Yes	
"be your girl"	2004	Chieko Kawabe	Brilliance	No	Yes	
"☆Hoshi ni Negai wo"	2004	Chieko Kawabe	Brilliance	No	Yes	
"Shining!"/"cry baby"	2004	Chieko Kawabe	Brilliance	No	Yes	
"little wing"	2004	Chieko Kawabe	Brilliance	No	Yes	
"I Can't Wait"	2005	Chieko Kawabe	Brilliance	No	Yes	
"Sekai no Owari" (せカゝι) σ おわ└))	2005	SAE	Sh15uya OST	Yes	Yes	
"before"	2006	Aki Misato	Sincerely	No	Yes	
"Ryūsei Shoot"	2006	Cluster'S	Cluster Edge OST	No	Yes	
"Happiness"	2007	Aki Misato	feel it	No	Yes	
"Honki Mekimeki♥Tokimekimeki"	2007	Athena & Robikerottsu	Shouri no BIG WAVE!!!	No	Yes	
"Sorairo Days" (空色デイズ, Sorairo Deizu; "Sky Blue Days")	2007	Shoko Nakagawa	Tengen Toppa Gurren Lagann OST	No	Yes	
"Yuugure☆Sherbet"	2008	Athena & Robikerottsu	Seishun! LOVE Lunch	Yes	Yes	
"Tsuzuku Sekai" (続く世界; "The World Continues")	2008	Shoko Nakagawa	Tengen Toppa Gurren Lagann: Guren-hen OST	No	Yes	
"staple stable"	2009	Chiwa Saitō	Monogatari OST	No	Yes	
"Kaerimichi"	2010	Emiri Katō	Monogatari OST	No	Yes	
"Ambivalent World"	2010	Miyuki Sawashiro	Monogatari OST	No	Yes	
"Renai Circulation"	2010	Kana Hanazawa	Monogatari OST	No	Yes	
"Sugar Sweet Nightmare"	2010	Yui Horie	Monogatari OST	No	Yes	
"étoile et toi"	2010	Clémentine	Monogatari OST	No	Yes	
"étoile et toi (édition le blanc)"	2010	Clémentine	Monogatari OST	No	Yes	
"étoile et toi (édition le noir)"	2010	Clémentine	Monogatari OST	No	Yes	
"Futakotome"	2010	Chiwa Saitō	Monogatari OST	No	Yes	
"marshmallow justice"	2010	Eri Kitamura	Monogatari OST	No	Yes	
"Platinum Disco"	2012	Yuka Iguchi	Nisemonogatari OST	No	Yes	
"perfect slumbers"	2012	Yui Horie	Nekomonogatari (Black) OST	No	Yes	
"chocolate insomnia"	2012	Yui Horie	Nekomonogatari (White) OST	No	Yes	
"happy bite"	2013	Emiri Katō	Kabukimonogatari OST	No	Yes	
"Mōsō♥Express"	2013	Kana Hanazawa	Otorimonogatari OST	No	Yes	
"white lies"	2013	Maaya Sakamoto	Onimonogatari OST	No	Yes	
"fast love"	2013	Chiwa Saitō	Koimonogatari OST	No	Yes	
"Kogarashi Sentiment"	2013	Chiwa Saitō	Koimonogatari OST	No	Yes	
"SIRIUS"	2013	Eir Aoi	Aube	No	Yes	
"snowdrop",	2014	Miyuki Sawashiro	Hanamonogatari OST	No	Yes	
"the last day of my adolescence"	2014	Miyuki Sawashiro	Hanamonogatari OST	No	Yes	
"Orange Mint"	2014	Saori Hayami	Tsukimonogatari OST	No	Yes	
"border"	2014	ClariS	Tsukimonogatari OST	No	Yes	
"ambiguous"	2014	GARNiDELiA	Linkage Ring	No	Yes	
"decent black"	2015	Kaori Mizuhashi	Owarimonogatari I OST	No	Yes	
"mathemagics"	2015	Marina Inoue|	Owarimonogatari I OST	No	Yes	
"Yūritsu Hōteishiki"	2015	Marina Inoue|	Owarimonogatari I OST	No	Yes	
"mein schatz"	2015	Clammbon	Owarimonogatari I OST	No	Yes	
"terminal terminal"	2017	Emiri Katō	Owarimonogatari II OST	No	Yes	
"dreamy date drive"	2017	Chiwa Saitō	Owarimonogatari II OST	No	Yes	
"dark cherry mystery"	2017	Kaori Mizuhashi	Owarimonogatari II OST	No	Yes	
"07734"	2019	Hiroshi Kamiya	Zoku Owarimonogatari OST	No	Yes	
"KOKORO no Fukai TOKORO"		Ami Koshimizu		Yes		
"Haru Harari"		Chinatouchable		Yes		
"Shōri no Hanabira"		Chinatouchable		Yes		
"better half"		Nami Tamaki		Yes		
"New World"		Nami Tamaki		Yes		
"Funsui Kōen"		Masumi Asano		Yes		
"SHINKA-SHINKA"		Megumi Ogata		Yes		
"LOVE*MEGA"		SHIPS	Kirarin Revolution OST	Yes		
"Hajimete"		Ryōko Shintani		Yes		
"Itsu de mo Hohoemi wo"		Ritsuko Okazaki		Yes		
"Ichigo Iro no Kimochi"		Umika Kawashima		Yes		
"Atashi ga Shuyaku!" (Japanese: あたしが主役!)	2005	Megumi Nasu	Peach Girl OST	Yes		
"Tashika na Mono" (Japanese: たしかなもの)	2005	meg rock	Peach Girl OST	Yes		
"Heart Wing -Kokoro no Tsubasa-"		Hisayo Mochizuki		Yes		
"Himitsu"		Hisayo Mochizuki		Yes		
"Tanoshii Eikaiwa de Happy Life wo!"		Hisayo Mochizuki		Yes		
"Dry Curry"	2004	Kana Ueda	Kanairo		Yes	
"Kaze ni Nosete"	2004	Kana Ueda	Kanairo		Yes	
"Namida-biyori"	2004	Kana Ueda	Kanairo		Yes	
"Catch You Catch Me"	2007	Shoko Nakagawa	Shokotan Best	No	Yes	
"happily ever after"	2008	Shoko Nakagawa	Big Bang!!!		Yes	
"Kimi ni Melolon" (Japanese: 君にメロロン)	2008	Shoko Nakagawa	snow tears		Yes	
"Macaroon♥Holiday" (Japanese: マカロン☆ホリディ)	2009	Shoko Nakagawa	Magic Time		Yes	
"Ōedo ha Carnival!" (Japanese: お江戸はカーニバル!)	2006	Shoko Nakagawa	Brilliant Dream		Yes	
"Sherbet-iro no Jikan" (Japanese: シャーベット色の時間)	2009	Shoko Nakagawa	Magic Time		Yes	
"through the looking glass"	2009	Shoko Nakagawa	Magic Time		Yes	
"icecream°"	2024	Yuka Iguchi; Saori Hayami	Monogatari Off & Monster Season OST	No	Yes	
"caramel ribbon cursetard"	2024	Kana Hanazawa; Saori Hayami	Monogatari Off & Monster Season OST	No	Yes	
