= Symphonic Rain =

2004 video game

- Original visual novel cover
- Developer: JP: Kogado Studio
- Publishers: JP: Kogado Studio; WW: Degica
- Platform: Windows
- Release: JP: March 26, 2004; WW: June 14, 2017
- Genres: Rhythm game, Visual novel
- Mode: Single-player

Symphonic Rain (シンフォニック＝レイン, Shinfonikku Rein) is a Japanese musical visual novel developed by Kogado Studio and first released as a limited-edition version on March 26, 2004, for Windows as part of a series of "music adventure" games done by its Kuroneko-san Team; the regular edition followed on August 27, 2004. The game is rated for all-ages, and contains themes which revolve around romance and relationships. The game was later published and released in Taiwan, Hong Kong, Singapore, and Mainland China by T-Time Technology. Symphonic Rain was released twice more in Japan, first on June 24, 2005, as a collector's edition, and again on November 22, 2007, as a popular edition at a reduced price.

== Gameplay ==
Similar to other visual novels, Symphonic Rain is highly text-based and most of the game requires little player interaction apart from clicking a few options presented to the player, usually dealing with where he wishes to head to after school. At certain points during the course of the story, the game switches into a "song-playing mode" where the player is required to hit keys to the beat of a background music track, usually sung by one of the heroines of the game, guided by different-colored musical notes scrolling from the right of the screen to the left. Each one of the notes are inscribed with a letter on the keyboard, which the player has to press when the note reaches a boxed-up region beside the treble clef. Points are awarded for the accuracy of keyboard input, starting with zero points for an inaccurate attempt, eight points for being slightly off, and thirty-five points for being exact. The value of each exact attempt increases as the player successfully creates chains of such accuracy, breaking the chain when an error is made or becomes slightly off.

Exact attempts also raise the evaluation meter at the bottom left corner of the screen by a single point each (marked by a small ring, which lights up with every point earned). When ten of these rings are lit, a large circular lamp directly above lights up while the rings revert to their darkened state. Similarly, an inaccurate attempt will darken a ring or a lamp should there be no lit rings. A minimum of four lit lamps are required for the song to be evaluated as a "pass", and this directly affects the story in a usually positive way. Players who are not proficient with this "song-playing mode" can switch on the autoplay function in the menu to enable the computer to hit all the notes. However, in this mode, the score will remain at zero.

There are a total of six good endings and three bad endings. The player would have to complete the three main heroine's story (also known as the Da Capo scenario) before the Al Fine scenario is made available. In Al Fine, the world is shown through the perspective of Tortinita Fine, and many questions about the story are finally answered by the end of the scenario. Chris, the original protagonist, is voiced in this scenario while Tortinita is not. Da capo and al fine are actual music terms and are both appropriate names for the story's parts in relation to the game's nature, as the story has to be repeated three times (one for each heroine) before ending with Al Fine's part of the story. After going through both the possible endings for Al Fine, players who return to Da Capo will make available Phorni's scenario (the "true end" of the game). The events that make up this scenario highlight the truth about Phorni and finally tie up all the loose ends of the story.

== Plot ==
Symphonic Rain takes place in a fictional city of Italian heritage named Piova where rain falls every day. The locals there have adapted to this peculiar phenomenon, and carry on with their lives as if the rain were never there. No one uses umbrellas, or rain coats. The main character of the story is seventeen-year-old Chris, a Fortelle student of the famous Piova Communal School of Music (Scuola Comunale di Musica Piova, in Italian). Separated from his childhood sweetheart Arietta when he left his home town for the city, he keeps in touch with her through weekly letters. Penning their thoughts on these letters, Chris treasures and keeps her weekly writings, for he had promised her that should his drawer become totally filled with them, he would return to her. The story begins during Chris's third year as a student, a few months before he has to take the school's final graduation examination: a stage performance. As an instrumentalist, he is required to search for a vocalist partner before he is eligible for the examination.

== Characters ==
=== Main characters ===
Chris Vertin (クリス・ヴェルティン, Kurisu Verutin)
Voiced by: Michio Miyashita (in Al Fine only)
The main protagonist of the game, whom you play as. A seventeen-year-old who came to the town with his childhood friend Tortinita to attend the music school. He is a third-year student of the keyboard-like instrument Fortelle, and dreams to become an accomplished musician. Apart from Tortinita and Asino, he virtually has no other friends at the school. A laid-back person, he is very talented at music.

Tortinita Fine (トルティニタ・フィーネ, Torutinita Fīne)
Voiced by: Mai Nakahara
A seventeen-year-old childhood friend of Chris who is likewise attending the music school, and arguably the leading female of the cast. The younger twin of Arietta, she is an active girl with a strong personality. Tortinita is a third year vocalist student of the school, and as such has the option of being able to give a solo performance for her graduation performance. Her nickname is Toruta. She has liked Chris ever since they were young, but since Chris chose Arietta, she decided to hide her feelings even though she started liking Chris before her sister did. They eat lunch together in the school cafeteria almost everyday.

Arietta Fine (アリエッタ・フィーネ, Arietta Fīne)
Voiced by: Mai Nakahara
The elder twin sister of Tortinita. She stayed in her hometown while her sister and Chris went to attend the music school, seemingly because she lacked the ability and talent. A quiet girl who's good at cooking and domestic work, she is introduced at the beginning as Chris' girlfriend, and they communicate every week by sending letters to each other. Her nickname is Arie.

Falsita Fawcett (ファルシータ・フォーセット, Farushīta Fōsetto)
Voiced by: Masumi Asano
The former president of the student's council, Falsita is a talented third year vocalist student who's searching for a Fortelle-playing partner for her graduation concert at the end of the year. She appears to be a gentle and graceful girl, but is known to be highly calculative and demanding, and is popular with the students of the school. She often does favors for people (such as writing a speech for the teacher), and works part-time at a restaurant, making her very busy. Her nickname is Fal.

Liselsia Cesarini (リセルシア・チェザリーニ, Riserushia Chezarīni)
Voiced by: Fumiko Orikasa
A fifteen-year-old Fortelle student who loves to sing. She is the daughter of the famous Fortelle player Grave Cesarini and hence is constantly pressured by her father to follow in his footsteps. She is a shy girl who hides in the abandoned school building to practice her singing in secret, away from her father's notice. Her nickname is Lise.

Phorni (フォーニ, Fōni)
Voiced by: Hiroko Kasahara
A small, fairy-like creature no taller than 14 cm and possessing tiny, translucent, fluttering wings. But, even though she is so small, she can sing and speak at a normal person's volume. Despite having wings, she cannot rise above a certain height. Phorni is the self-declared, 'fairy of music' who shares the room with Chris ever since he moved in. Apart from Chris, no one is able to hear her, see her, or touch her. She enjoys singing (which she is very good at), and would pester Chris into playing the Fortelle so that she can sing along. She has a habit of saying "miyah" when she is surprised.

=== Supporting characters ===
Asino Altiele (アーシノ・アルティエーレ, Āshino Arutiēre)
Voiced by: Hayato Watanabe
Chris' best and only male friend, he supports Chris from the side and seems to be very popular with girls. He had originally planned to partner with Falsita, but it is later revealed that she was only using him to obtain information about Chris and dumped him soon after.

Cordell (コーデル, Kōderu)
Voiced by: Yu Asakawa
Cordell is a strict but impartial teacher of great repute in the school. She is liked by many of the students there.

Grave Cesarini (グラーヴェ・チェザリーニ, Gurāve Chezarīni)
Voiced by: Kōichi Nagano
A nobleman who is both Liselsia's father and a famous Fortelle player. He looks at his daughter's efforts in singing with great disdain and frustration, and this has resulted in him employing rather drastic means to force his daughter to follow in his footsteps.

Ninna Fine (ニンナ·フィーネ, Ninna Fīne)
Voiced by: Michiru Wada
The grandmother of the Fine twins, she chose to live in the city because of her love for music. She lives together with Tortinita and gives much moral support to her. She is quite fond of Chris. Although nearly blind, she is very good at cooking.

== Development ==
Symphonic Rain was produced by the Kuroneko-san Team, one of seven development teams that make up Kogado Studio. Symphonic Rain was the third game in a series of "music adventure" (ミュージックアドベンチャー, myūjikku adobenchā) games produced by the team, and Kuroneko-san is the only team to produce such games in Kogado Studio. Art direction and character design was headed by Shiro, and background art was provided by Kazuo Ebisawa of Ufotable. The game's scenario was written entirely by Maoto Nishikawa who is credited as Q'tron for Symphonic Rain. Music in the game was written and composed by Ritsuko Okazaki through the music producing company Copyrights Bank, including collaboration with King Records. This was the last project, as well as the only visual novel, involving Okazaki due to her sudden death in May 2004.

=== Release history ===
Symphonic Rain was first released as a limited-edition version in Japan on March 26, 2004, as a DVD for Windows, and came bundled with a small figurine of Phorni. The regular edition of the game was released in Japan on August 27, 2004. The game was released abroad in Taiwan and Hong Kong on November 11, 2004, and again on May 25, 2005, in China. A collector's edition of the game was released in Japan on June 24, 2005, and was later released in Taiwan and Hong Kong on December 22, 2005. These versions were similarly made available to the Malaysian and Singapore markets around the same time. A downloadable version of the collector's edition was released in Korea on September 18, 2007. A popular edition of Symphonic Rain was released in Japan at a reduced price from the original release on November 22, 2007. An HD version of Symphonic Rain was released worldwide on June 14, 2017, with English, Japanese and Chinese language support.

== Related media ==
=== Print media ===
An art collection entitled Symphonic Rain Digital Picture Collection was released as a CD-ROM on August 26, 2004, by Kogado Studio. A single manga anthology volume entitled The End of Rain (雨の終わりに, Ame no Owari ni) was released by Kogado Studio at Comiket 73 on December 29, 2007, as a limited edition, and thus was not widely distributed. The anthology contained four chapters written and illustrated by different people. The first chapter, "Chris' Struggle: Cooking Battle" (クリス争奪☆料理合戦, Kurisu Sōdatsu Ryōri Kassen), was done by Sakuya Yūki; the second chapter, "What Will You Do If You Become Bigger?" (おおきくなったら何になる？, Ōkiku Nattara Nani ni Naru?), was done by Mū; the third chapter, "To Coda", was written by Maoto Nishikawa and illustrated by Shiro, who also drew the volume's cover art; the fourth chapter, "Difficult Music Studio Piova Agency" (なんきょく工房ピォーヴァ出張所, Nan Kyoku Kōbō Piōva Shucchōjo), was done by Pen-chan. Nishikawa also wrote a series of short stories for Symphonic Rain's five heroines which is available online at the game's official website.

=== Music ===
The cover of the album Rainbow

In Symphonic Rain, the ten songs available for the player to play during gameplay were released on an image song album entitled Rainbow released on May 26, 2004, by King Records. The songs on the album are sung by the voice actresses of the game's five main heroines, and the late Ritsuko Okazaki. A cover version of the album entitled For RITZ featuring Okazaki singing all the songs was released posthumously on December 29, 2004, by King Records. The disc was produced as a memorial towards Okazaki, and included all ten songs from the original game, and "For Fruits Basket", the opening song of the anime series Fruits Basket.

Image songs

1. "The Other Side of the Sky" (空の向こうに, Sora no Mukō ni) by Ritsuko Okazaki
2. "Even When Crying" (涙がほおを流れても, Namida ga Hō o Nagarete mo) by Okazaki
3. "Secret" (秘密, Himitsu) by Mai Nakahara
4. "Always Smiling" (いつでも微笑みを, Itsudemo Hohoemi o) by Nakahara
5. "The Music of Rain" (雨のmusique, Ame no musique) by Masumi Asano
6. "Melody" (メロディー, Merodī) by Asano
7. "High School Girl" (リセエンヌ, Riseennu; "Lycéenne" in French) by Fumiko Orikasa
8. "Hello!" by Orikasa
9. "Fay" by Hiroko Kasahara
10. "I'm Always Close to You" by Okazaki

== Reception ==
In Getchu.com's 2004 Moe Game Ranking (based on user votes), Symphonic Rain won fourth place in the Overall, Scenario, and Music categories, as well as tenth place in the System category and 15th in Artwork. Kogado Studio was voted the sixth best game maker for that year, outranking other well-known companies such as NekoNeko Soft, Nitroplus, F&C, and Studio e.go!. Phorni was selected as the fifth best heroine from games released in 2004.
