= Melocure =

Japanese pop duo

- Origin: Tokyo, Japan
- Years active: 2002–2004
- Label: Columbia Music Entertainment
- Members: Ritsuko Okazaki; Megumi Hinata

Melocure (メロキュア, Merokyua) was a Japanese pop duo consisting of Megumi Hinata and Ritsuko Okazaki. The duo's name is a pun on the term melodic hardcore. Signed to Columbia Music Entertainment, the duo was formed in 2002 and lasted until 2004 due to Okazaki's untimely death.

== History ==
=== 2002-2003: Debut ===
Melocure formed in April 2002 and debuted with the song "Itoshii Kakera (My Better Half)", which was used as the anime series UFO Ultramaiden Valkyrie's opening theme song. More of Melocure's work was used as insert songs and themes for subsequent seasons of the show, as well as in the soundtracks of Stratos 4 and Okusama ha Mahō Shōjo. Melocure also had a weekly internet radio talk show.

=== 2004: Okazaki's death and disbandment ===
They released their album Melodic Hard Cure in March 2004. Less than two months later, Okazaki died suddenly at the age of 44 from septic shock as a result of sepsis. Melocure's final song, Home & Away, was finished by Hinata after Okazaki's death and released more than a year later.

Although Okazaki has died, Hinata has said on her radio show that she will continue Melocure for the rest of her life, singing Melocure songs at her live shows in Okazaki's memory.

== Discography ==
=== Singles ===
Year	Title	Album	Notes	Ref
2002	"Itoshii Kakera (愛しいかけら)"		First season opening theme to UFO Ultramaiden Valkyrie	
2003	"1st Priority"		Opening theme to Stratos 4	
2003	"Meguriai (めぐり逢い)"		Second opening theme to UFO Ultramaiden Valkyrie	
2005	"Home & Away (ホーム&アウェイ)"	Home & Away/Jewelry	Opening theme to Okusama ha Mahō Shōjo; A-side to Kikuko Inoue's "Jewelry"	

=== Albums ===
Title	Album	Album details	Ref
2004	Melodic Hard Cure (メロディック・ハード・キュア)	Released: March 17, 2004; Label: Nippon Columbia; Formats: CD, DVD, digital download, streaming; Track listing: 1. Pop Step Jump!; 2. 1st Priority; 3. Meguriai (めぐり逢い); 4. "Niji wo Mita" (「虹を見た」); 5. Kogarashi no Hodō wo Hana no Saku Haru wo (木枯らしの舗道を 花の咲く春を); 6. Himawari (向日葵); 7. Agapē; 8. birthday girl 9. Itoshii Kakera (愛しいかけら); 10. Sunday Sundae; 11. Futari no Sekai (ふたりのせかい); 12. ALL IN ALL; 13. rainbow kind of feeling 14. So far, so near 15. Shiawase (しあわせ); 16. Agapē (Mizu no Wakusei ver.) (Agapē (水の惑星Ver.)) - bonus track	
