= Oku-sama wa Mahō Shōjo: Bewitched Agnes =

Television anime

- Cover of DVD volume 1 featuring Ureshiko Asaba/Agnes Belle

奥さまは魔法少女 Bewitched Agnes (Oku-sama wa Mahō: Bewitched Agnes)
- Genre: Magical girl
- Created by: J.C.Staff; Hiroshi Nishikiori; Kazuhiko Ikeguchi
- Anime television series
- Directed by: Hiroshi Nishikiori
- Produced by: Oshi Yoshinuma; Isao Hidaka; Yuuji Matsukura; Takahiro Inagaki
- Written by: Series composition: Hiroshi Nishikiori; Kazuhiko Ikeguchi; Yuuji Matsukura; Screenplay: Akira Okeya; Mayori Sekijima
- Music by: Kenji Kondou; Takerou Sekijima
- Studio: J.C.Staff
- Original network: Kids Station
- Original run: 4 July 2005 – 25 September 2005
- Episodes: 13
- Manga
- Written by: J.C.Staff; Hiroshi Nishikiori; Kazuhiko Ikeguchi
- Illustrated by: Tōko Kanno
- Published by: MediaWorks
- Magazine: Dengeki Comic Gao!
- Original run: February 2005 – August 2006
- Volumes: 3

Oku-sama wa Mahō Shōjo: Bewitched Agnes (奥さまは魔法少女 Bewitched Agnes; literally My Wife is a Magical Girl: Bewitched Agnes) is a magical girl anime comedy created by J.C.Staff, director and scriptwriter Hiroshi Nishikiori and producer Kazuhiko Ikeguchi. It was broadcast on several television channels in Japan between July and September 2005. The series is about a housewife and magical girl who has been assigned a replacement and must come to terms with growing up.

The title of the series pays homage to the popular 1960s sitcom Bewitched, known in Japan as Oku-sama wa Majo ("My Wife is a Witch"), which heavily influenced the first magical girl anime, Sally the Witch.

== Plot ==
On the surface, Ureshiko Asaba appears to be a 26-year-old housewife who helps to run a boarding house. In reality she is a magical girl from the world of Realm. When she transforms into her magical girl persona, Ureshiko is called Agnes Bell, and her job is to protect the Wonderland—an artificial town created by her mother, who protected the town in the same way many years ago.

One day another magical girl appears from Realm—Cruje Gapp has been sent to replace Ureshiko as the manager of the town, as Ureshiko has become too old. However, if Agnes relinquishes her responsibility, the town as it stands will vanish and be remade according to Cruje's wishes, which goes against all of Agnes's beliefs. Agnes refuses to hand over the Managerial Ring to Cruje, which is the only item powerful enough to begin the town's transformation. In the end, Cruje is forced to give up, and enrolls in a local middle school under the alias Sayaka Kurenai while biding her time.

However, this is not Ureshiko's only problem—she and her husband have grown distant after she refuses to kiss him after having sexual relationships, and she starts to flirt with Tatsumi Kagura, a young man who is lodging in her home.

== Media ==
=== Anime ===
Oku-sama wa Mahō Shōjo: Bewitched Agnes was produced by Media Factory, Toshiba Entertainment, J.C.Staff, Tram and Kids Station. It is directed by Hiroshi Nishikiori, with Yūji Matsukura, Kazuhiko Ikeguchi and Nishikiori himself handling series composition, Shinya Hasegawa designing the characters, Kenji Kondō and Takerō Sekijima composing the music and Chikako Shibata in charge of art direction. The opening theme is "Home & Away" (ホーム&アウェイ) by Melocure and the ending theme is "Jewelry" by Kikuko Inoue. The series was initially broadcast in Japan in thirteen episodes between 4 July 2005 and 25 September 2005 on several television channels: Chiba TV, Kids Station, Sun TV, TV Aichi, TV Kanagawa, and TV Saitama.

=== CDs ===
Following the release of the series, two separate CDs were also created and released. Both feature the show's original voice talent. The first to be released was a drama CD featuring segments that take place before the beginning of the televised series, and explain why Ureshiko left her home with Tamotsu Asaba. The second was a CD featuring the opening and closing themes of the song, both in their original forms and as karaoke. The track lists for both albums are found below.

==== Okusama wa 17-sai to 3652-nichi! ====
Drama CD released on July 6, 2005

1. Minna no Okusama (22:36)
2. Namida no Birthday (21:25)
3. Mainichi ga Birthday (3:59)
4. Ureshiko kara no Message (2:29)

==== Home & Away/Jewelry ====
Music CD released on July 27, 2005

- Home & Away (4:29)
  - Artist: Melocure
- Jewelry (4:30)
  - Artist: Kikuko Inoue
- Home & Away (karaoke) (4:30)
- Jewelry (karaoke) (4:28)
