= List of Revolutionary Girl Utena characters =

The primary cast of Revolutionary Girl Utena, illustrated by Shinya Hasegawa based on designs by Chiho Saito

Revolutionary Girl Utena, a Japanese anime television series created by Be-Papas, features an extensive cast of characters. The series' protagonist is Utena Tenjou, a tomboy middle school student who is drawn into a series of sword duels to win the hand of Anthy Himemiya, a mysterious student known as the "Rose Bride". The characters were created by series director Kunihiko Ikuhara, and were designed by Chiho Saito. Saito's designs were then adapted for use in the television anime series by Shinya Hasegawa. The character names follow a motif of being related to plants when written in kanji; "Utena" (萼), for example, means "calyx".

== Primary characters ==
=== Utena Tenjou ===
Voiced by: Tomoko Kawakami (Japanese); Rachael Lillis (English)

Utena Tenjou (天上 ウテナ, Tenjō Utena) is a tomboyish, courageous and naïve character who lives to emulate the idealized prince figure from her childhood. She is forthright, honest and friendly. Nearly all the girls in school adore her. She both subverts and conforms to the stereotypes she embodies as a noble warrior and a naïve magical girl in danger of becoming a damsel in distress. The series chronicles her journey to protect her friend Anthy and become a truly noble Prince. Utena's complex relationship with Anthy, going from strangers to close friends (who nonetheless resent and misunderstand one another) to blooming into love, is one of the most important themes in the series. In the manga, Utena's relationship with Anthy is only that of friendship and it's hinted she has feelings for Touga. In the movie, Utena went to Ohtori to find Touga after the two apparently broke up. She mistakenly believes Anthy is the cause for the breakup, but soon forms a relationship with Anthy. Their relationship becomes more sexually tinged compared to the TV series. The characters are seen kissing both in the TV show credits and the movie. Her Dueling Rose is white.

=== Anthy Himemiya ===
Voiced by: Yuriko Fuchizaki (Japanese); Sharon Becker (English)

Anthy Himemiya (姫宮 アンシー, Himemiya Anshī) is a mysterious, shy girl whose distant expression and superficial politeness mask a complex, darker personality. It is said that she has no thoughts or desires of her own; she will do anything her master expects of her. Because of her "doormat" behavior, other characters tend to project their wants or desires onto her, and she is always the target of their eventual rage. Her past and current personality are simultaneously tragic and sinister, and her personality shifts between selfless love, passive-aggressiveness, cruelty and learned helplessness. Like Utena, Anthy also subverts and conforms to the stereotypes she embodies as both a princess and a witch. Near the end of the series she betrays Utena and stabs her with the sword of Dios as she is afraid of the change that Utena represents. When, despite this, Utena tries to save Anthy and takes the Swords of Hatred in her place, Anthy in a way has been revolutionized by Utena's love and is neither controlled by Akio nor does she remain the Rose Bride. She leaves the school to find Utena. In the movie, Anthy is portrayed as much less manipulative and more open.

== Supporting characters ==
=== Ohtori Academy ===
==== Akio Ohtori ====
Voiced by: Jūrōta Kosugi (Japanese, TV series); Mitsuhiro Oikawa (Japanese, film); Josh Mosby (English)

Akio Ohtori (鳳 暁生, Ōtori Akio) is Anthy's mysterious older brother. In the anime, Akio was a prince named Dios in his previous life, and it is in this guise that he meets with Utena, inspiring her to become a prince. He conspires to regain his power by taking Utena's sword, exploiting Anthy as a wedge through their incestuous and power-driven relationship. He is ultimately thwarted by Utena's sacrifice; Anthy finds the courage to finally leave him and Ohtori Academy behind, and his fate from this point on is unknown. In the manga, Akio and Dios are gods, the former having killed the latter in order to gain his power. In the film, Dios is the lord of the flies rendered in human form by Anthy's magic; Akio is dead, having thrown himself out of a window after realizing Anthy was lucid when he drugged and raped her. Akio's given name is derived from the Japanese name for Venus the Morning Star (明けの明星, ake no myōjō), which is identified with Lucifer.

==== Dios ====
Voiced by: Hiro Yuki (Japanese); Josh Mosby (English)

Dios (ディオス, Diosu) is the prince who gave Utena the rose signet ring. In the manga, Dios is conceived as one of the two consciousnesses that once resided in the body of the Prince, who was defeated by Akio and turned into the Sword of Dios that resides within Anthy.

=== Student Council ===
==== Touga Kiryuu ====
Voiced by: Takehito Koyasu (Japanese); Crispin Freeman (English)

Touga Kiryuu (桐生 冬芽, Kiryū Tōga) is the president of the Student Council and Ohtori's resident playboy, Touga is an arrogant and handsome young man whose desire to be powerful drives him to cruel, unscrupulous deeds and whose manipulative abilities are second only to Akio. He is the only regular Council Member who deliberately involves himself in Akio's plans. Despite his talent and intelligence, Touga eventually realizes that he's not as influential as Akio, and this causes him to change his ways as he tries to discover a new method to gain power. In the manga his sexual behavior is downplayed and he becomes a servant to Utena in order to help her as well as get close to her. In the movie, he used to be Utena's boyfriend but something happened that caused them to drift apart. In the movie, instead of Dios, Touga is the main motivation for Utena to go to Ohtori. He is gentle and noble but it is shown in a flashback that he was raped by his adopted father. An episode was planned that focused on this aspect of Touga's past in the TV series, but due to Takehito Koyasu's absence this plot point never came to be. His Dueling Rose is red.

==== Kyouichi Saionji ====
Voiced by: Takeshi Kusao (Japanese); Jack Taylor (English)

Kyouichi Saionji (西園寺 莢一, Saionji Kyōichi) is the vice-president of the Student Council and captain of the kendo team. Kyouichi is temperamental, egotistical, prone to angry rages, and often cruel. Kyouichi's lack of self-control stems from insecurity, a lifelong rivalry against Touga from which he is always at the losing end, and the fear that everyone and everything he knows will eventually die. He is obsessed with Anthy because he views the Rose Bride as a mindless doll who will never disobey him, and thus be with him forever. His Dueling Rose is green.

==== Juri Arisugawa ====
Voiced by: Kotono Mitsuishi (Japanese); Mandy Bonhomme (English)

Juri Arisugawa (有栖川 樹璃, Arisugawa Juri) is captain of the academy's fencing team, Juri is one of Ohtori's most highly respected students, and even the teachers appear to be in awe of her. Her aloof, intimidating manner hides her secret love for her childhood friend, Shiori. Of the Student Council Duelists, she is thought to be the most noble, and thus the one with the most potential to become a Prince, but her nobility and the strength that comes with it are constantly undermined by her desires and despair. In the manga, she is in love with Touga and hates Utena for being a rival to his heart. Juri's Japanese voice actress Kotono Mitsuishi previously worked with Ikuhara on Sailor Moon, where she voiced the title character. Her Dueling Rose is orange.

==== Miki Kaoru ====
Voiced by: Aya Hisakawa (Japanese); Jimmy Zoppi (English)

Miki Kaoru (薫 幹, Kaoru Miki) is an ingenuous and polite seventh grader who befriends Utena, despite their role as possible opponents in the duels. He is especially known for his skill with the piano. In spite (or because of) his genius, he is lonely, sheltered and insecure, and seeks a person who is just as pure and talented as him. With the exception of their two duels, Miki is mostly a friend to Utena. In the anime he has a crush on Anthy, whereas in the manga he has a crush on Utena. His Dueling Rose is light blue.

==== Nanami Kiryuu ====
Voiced by: Yuri Shiratori (Japanese); Leah Applebaum (English)

Nanami Kiryuu (桐生 七実, Kiryū Nanami) is Touga's dramatic younger sister, often used as comic relief throughout the series. Her love for her brother borders on obsession and incest, and she is often seen using devious means to punish the people who take Touga's attentions away from her. Despite this, she displays a certain childish innocence in her desires, that is distinctly at odds with Akio and Anthy's relationship. Though her motivations are considered the least ambitious out of all the Duelists, they are no less real to her, and she suffers just as much as all the other Student Council members throughout the series, being a constant victim of her brother's manipulations. She is only shown in a photo in the manga and has no role in the movie, but is briefly shown as a cow, referring to one of the "gag" episodes of the series where Nanami turns into a cow. Her Dueling Rose is yellow.

==== Ruka Tsuchiya ====
Voiced by: Nozomu Sasaki (Japanese); Wayne Grayson (English)

Ruka Tsuchiya (土谷 瑠果, Tsuchiya Ruka) is the former captain of the fencing team and a former member of the Student Council. His cunning, manipulative behavior belies a hidden desperation to live and help the one he loves, and his influence on Juri becomes one of the major turning points for her character. His Dueling Rose is dark blue.

=== Students ===
==== Wakaba Shinohara ====
Voiced by: Yuka Imai (Japanese); Roxanne Beck (English)

Wakaba Shinohara (篠原 若葉, Shinohara Wakaba) is Utena's best friend. She is cheerful, but feels surrounded by "special" people and doesn't know how to become special herself. Thus, she develops an obsession with creating situations where "special" people (namely Utena and Saionji) must rely on her in some way, which allows her to feel special by virtue of these "special" people being dependent on her. Wakaba sees herself as a perfectly average person and is only happy when she takes care of people because she does not feel like she has any other talents. Wakaba does not realize the importance of her role in the story – her crush on Kyouichi Saionji and his rejection caused Utena to become involved in the duels in the first place, and her empathy and passion rescued Utena from a slump after the first Touga duel. She ends up becoming a Black Rose Duelist, having been twisted by her hatred for Anthy and envy towards Utena, as well as her blind desperation to keep Saionji from returning to school and leaving her.

==== Kashira Shadow Players ====
Voiced by: Maria Kawamura, Satomi Koorogi, and Kumiko Watanabe (Japanese); Amanda Goodman, Carol Jacobanis, and Lisa Ortiz (English)

The Kashira Shadow Players (劇団影絵カシラ, Gekidan Kagee Kashira) are a theatre troupe who appear in nearly every episode to comment on the episode's themes in the form of an allegorical shadow play. Their relationship to the cast of the series is initially unclear, as they appear only as silhouettes and do not interact with other characters; as such, they assume the role of a Greek chorus that only the audience can perceive. As the series progresses, the Shadow Players gradually interact with and are acknowledged by the other characters, and appear in person towards the end of the series to invite Utena to one of their plays. The players have no given names but do have distinct hairstyles, and are referred to in the series' credits as Girl A (A子, A-ko), Girl B (B子, B-ko), and Girl C (C子, C-ko), respectively.

==== Kozue Kaoru ====
Voiced by: Chieko Honda (Japanese); Roxanne Beck (English)

Kozue Kaoru (薫 梢, Kaoru Kozue) is Miki's twin sister, Kozue feels overshadowed by her brother's talents and reacts by sleeping with many different men. She's extremely possessive of Miki to the point where she physically hurts anyone who tries to hurt or "steal" him. In the manga, Kozue's brother complex is purely innocent and she acts more like Nanami does in the TV series. In the movie, Kozue is in an implied incestuous relationship with her brother but Miki is shown breaking it up. Later on, Kozue is shown as a car implying she is either also helping Miki to escape Ohtori or simply helping Utena and Anthy.

==== Shiori Takatsuki ====
Voiced by: Kumiko Nishihara (Japanese); Lisa Ortiz (English)

Shiori Takatsuki (高槻 枝織, Takatsuki Shiori) is the catalyst for Juri's current broken state of mind. She simultaneously idolizes Juri for her brilliance and feels envious of her for it. Her extreme lack of self-worth is the reason for the rocky relationship between the two, and it reaches a breaking point when Ruka re-enters Ohtori Academy. According to Kunihiko Ikuhara, Shiori was ironically also in love with Juri the entire time but she believes Juri's affection towards her was out of pity, not love. She thus wants to remain in control of their relationship by never confessing to Juri so she will be the winner of their rivalry. In the movie, she is the main antagonist who manipulates Juri's feelings for her so Juri can duel with Utena, with her ultimate goal being to use Juri to escape the school. The film version of Shiori lacks the self-esteem problems of her TV counterpart, and instead is a hateful narcissist who believes that she is the only one worthy of leaving the school and entering the world of adulthood, and will use anyone or anything to get there. In the end of the film, Shiori makes a mad dash (in car form) to escape the school once Utena and Anthy earn the right to leave. However, she ends up crashing and exploding as she tries to push them off the road, presumably killing her.

Shiori's character design is based on the protagonist of Saito's manga Himegoto no Natsu.

==== Mitsuru Tsuwabuki ====
Voiced by: Akiko Yajima (Japanese); Ted Lewis (English)

Mitsuru Tsuwabuki (石蕗 美蔓, Tsuwabuki Mitsuru) is a fourth grade boy, and Nanami's most devoted lackey. He has an obsessive crush on Nanami, and is fixated on becoming her adored "brother". Mitsuru's fruitless attempts to woo Nanami influences him into becoming a Black Rose Duelist.

==== Keiko Sonoda, Yuuko Ohse & Aiko Wakiya ====
Voiced by: Akira Nakagawa, Emi Motoi, and Naoko Takano (Japanese); Mandy Bonhomme, Kerry Williams, and Carol Jacobanis (English)

Keiko Sonoda (苑田 茎子, Sonoda Keiko), Yuuko Ohse (大瀬優子, Ōse Yūko), and Aiko Wakiya (脇谷愛子, Wakiya Aiko) are the members of Nanami's clique. Keiko follows Nanami solely because she has a crush on Touga, and her jealousy causes her to become a Black Rose Duelist.

==== Suzuki, Yamada & Tanaka ====
Voiced by: Takuma Suzuki, Katashi Ishizuka, and Hiroyuki Yoshino (Japanese); Jimmy Zoppi (English)

Three male students who romantically pursue Nanami.

=== Other characters ===
==== Chu-chu ====
Voiced by: Satomi Koorogi (Japanese); Rachael Lillis (English)

Chu-chu (チュチュ) is a purple monkey-like creature owned as a pet by Anthy, who serves as the comic relief for the series. Ikuhara stated that he "didn't put much thought" into Chu-chu, and that he exists largely to fill the role of the animal mascot character that is obligatory in mainstream anime. The scenes featuring the character were directed by assistant director Shingo Kaneko, who characterized Chu-chu as having an "utter lack of obligation to the story", and that he wanted to "make the viewers feel unsettled whenever he's on screen".

==== Souji Mikage ====
Voiced by: Hikaru Midorikawa (Japanese); Dan Green (English)

Souji Mikage (御影 草時, Mikage Sōji) is head of the Mikage Seminar at Ohtori Academy. He wishes to kill Anthy and install a gravely ill boy, Mamiya Chida, as the Rose Bride in order to save him from terminal illness. Mikage uses manipulation and psychology to control individuals close to the Council members in order to turn them into Black Rose duelists.

==== Mamiya Chida ====
Voiced by: Maria Kawamura (Japanese); Liam O'Brien (English)

Mamiya Chida (千唾 馬宮, Chida Mamiya) is the younger brother of Tokiko, and a friend of Souji. He likes the smell of roses and takes care of those in his sister's garden. Being gravely ill, he starts to desire eternity after knowing of the project Souji is involved in, which gives him the idea of installing Mamiya as the Rose Bride.

==== Tokiko Chida ====
Voiced by: Noriko Hidaka

Tokiko Chida (千唾 時子, Chida Tokiko) is the older sister of Mamiya. She is romantically interested in Souji.

==== Kanae Ohtori ====
Voiced by: Ai Orikasa (Japanese); Kerry Williams (English)

Kanae Ohtori (鳳 香苗, Ōtori Kanae) is Akio's fiancée, daughter of the school's Trustee Chairman. She has a strained relationship with Anthy, who she finds "creepy and intolerable", and considers Anthy an obstacle to her relationship with Akio. Though she loves Akio very much, she feels distant from him and becomes the first Black Rose Duelist. It is implied that, after her defeat, Akio poisons her since he never actually loved her and used their relationship simply to keep his status as interim chairman of the school.

==== Keropon ====
Keropon (ケロポン) is a red, crocodile-like creature who appears in the movie. It is first seen as a drawing Shiori draws on Touga's back, and is later seen as a living creature in a video tape.
