= Sarazanmai =

Japanese anime television series

- Promotional art for the series
- さらざんまい
- Genre: Coming-of-age; Fantasy; Magical realism
- Created by: Ikunirappa (Note: A portmanteau of "Ikuhara" from Kunihiko Ikuhara, "Lapin Track", and "MAPPA".)
- Screenplay by: Kunihiko Ikuhara; Teruko Utsumi
- Directed by: Nobuyuki Takeuchi (chief); Kunihiko Ikuhara
- Music by: Yukari Hashimoto
- Country of origin: Japan
- Original language: Japanese
- No. of episodes: 11

Production
- Producers: Yukiko Takase (chief); Masanori Miyake (chief); Yuka Okayasu; Kenta Suzuki
- Animators: MAPPA; Lapin Track
- Production companies: Fuji Television; Aniplex; Animax Broadcast Japan; Kitac; Dentsu; Movic; Gentosha Comics

Original release
- Network: Fuji Television
- Release: April 11 – June 20, 2019

Related
- Manga

Sarazanmai: Reo and Mabu
- Written by: Kunihiko Ikuhara
- Illustrated by: Misaki Saitō
- Published by: Gentosha
- English publisher: NA: Seven Seas Entertainment
- Magazine: RuTile; RuTile Sweet
- Original run: May 22, 2018 – March 22, 2019
- Volumes: 1
- Light novel
- Written by: Kunihiko Ikuhara; Teruko Utsumi
- Illustrated by: Miggy
- Published by: Gentosha
- English publisher: NA: Seven Seas Entertainment
- Published: March 16, 2019
- Stage show
- Sarazanmai Once More: A Stage of Love and Desire (Sara ni Sarazanmai: Ai to Yokubō no Stage), 2019

Sarazanmai (Japanese: さらざんまい) is a Japanese anime television series jointly produced by MAPPA and Lapin Track. The series aired on Fuji TV's Noitamina programming block from April 11 to June 20, 2019, for eleven episodes, and follows three middle school students who are transformed into kappas in order to collect shirikodama, mythical balls located in the anus that contains the physical manifestation of one's desires; Ikuhara broadly developed the series as a story about yōkai (supernatural monsters) for an adult audience.

In English-language markets, Sarazanmai is syndicated by Crunchyroll, which simulcast the series during its original broadcast run; a dubbed version of the series was produced by Funimation. The series was praised by critics for the quality of its animation and its thematic richness, notably its focus on anti-capitalism and materialism, but was criticized for its compressed storytelling. Sarazanmai spawned a range of spin-off and adapted media both prior and subsequent to its release, including a serialized manga series, a manga anthology, a dramatized Twitter account, two light novels, a radio series, and a stage play.

== Synopsis ==
After accidentally breaking a statue of a kappa that serves as the guardian god of the district of Asakusa, middle school students Kazuki, Toi, and Enta are transformed into kappas by Keppi, the prince of the Kappa Kingdom. They come to assist Keppi in collecting the Dishes of Hope, which fulfill the wishes of whoever possesses them. Dishes are acquired by collecting the shirikodama of zombies created by Reo and Mabu, agents of the Otter Empire. The Otter Empire, in the guise of "Kappazon, Inc.", controls society by manipulating the desires of the masses, and has been the enemy of the Kappa Kingdom for generations. To defeat the zombies, the boys must say the phrase "Sarazanmai", which can only be produced when the three are united. They struggle to connect, as each time the sound is made, one of the boys' secrets is revealed.

== Characters ==
=== Main characters ===
Kazuki Yasaka (矢逆 一稀, Yasaka Kazuki)
Voiced by: Ayumu Murase (Japanese); Alejandro Saab (English)
A second year middle school student who is transformed into a kappa alongside Toi and Enta. He formerly played soccer with Enta, where they were known as the "golden duo", though he quit the sport immediately prior to the events of the series. He also cross dresses as the idol Sara Azuma to take selfies for his brother Haruka.

Toi Kuji (久慈 悠, Kuji Tōi)
Voiced by: Koki Uchiyama (Japanese); Ricco Fajardo (English)
A delinquent middle school student who is transformed into a kappa alongside Kazuki and Enta. A recent transfer student in Kazuki's class, he sells cannabis for his brother Chikai.

Enta Jinnai (陣内 燕太, Jinnai Enta)
Voiced by: Shun Horie (Japanese); Justin Briner (English)
Kazuki's childhood friend and classmate who is transformed into a kappa alongside Kazuki and Toi. Harbors a secret crush on Kazuki.

=== Yōkai ===
Keppi (ケッピ, Keppi)
Voiced by: Junichi Suwabe (Japanese); Tyler Walker (English)
A kappa who is the prince of the Kappa Kingdom. Prior to the events of the series, the trauma of the Kappa Kingdom being defeated by the Otter Empire caused his shirikodama to split in two. The half containing his despair became Dark Keppi, a weapon of darkness controlled by the Otter Empire. Keppi maintained his other half, but was reduced to a chibi-style physical form, and was sealed in a statue in Kappabashi-dori before being awoken by Kazuki and Toi.

Reo Niiboshi (新星 玲央, Niiboshi Reo)
Voiced by: Mamoru Miyano (Japanese); Ian Sinclair (English)
A policeman who works in a kōban with Mabu, his partner and lover. He is a kappa who once served as a knight to Keppi, but now extracts the desires of humans on behalf of the Otter Empire after Otter resurrected Mabu. He wishes to use the Dishes of Hope to restore Mabu to his former self, who Reo believes is now merely a re-animated facsimile. In the spin-off manga, he is the adoptive father to Sara.

Mabu Akutsu (阿久津 真武, Akutsu Mabu)
Voiced by: Yoshimasa Hosoya (Japanese); Daman Mills (English)
A policeman who works in a kōban with Reo, his partner and lover. He is a kappa who once served as a knight to Keppi, but now extracts the desires of humans on behalf of the Otter Empire after being resurrected by Otter. Mabu was implanted with a mechanical heart by Otter after sacrificing himself to protect Reo, and now behaves in a cold and detached manner. Though Reo believes this is due to Mabu having to have lost his soul and personality after being resurrected, in reality, Mabu was forced to never again verbalize his love for Reo in exchange for his life. In the spin-off manga, he is the adoptive father to Sara.

Sara Azuma (吾妻 サラ, Azuma Sara)
Voiced by: Teiko Nanahara (Japanese); Sarah Wiedenheft (English)
Introduced as an idol and host of Asakusa Sara TV, Sara is actually a kappa, as well Keppi's love interest and princess. Similarly to the Shadow Players of Revolutionary Girl Utena and Double H of Penguindrum, Sara functions as the series' Greek chorus, commenting on the events of each episode in an allegorical manner. In the spin-off manga, she is the adopted daughter of Reo and Mabu.

Otter (カワウソ, Kawauso)
Voiced by: Takaya Kuroda (Japanese); Christopher Guerrero (English)
The Chief "Otticer" of Science and Technology for the Otter Empire, who describes himself as "an abstract concept". He assumes the physical form of one's inner desires, appearing as Reo to Mabu and Reo, as Kazuki to Enta, and as Chikai to Toi.

Zombies (ゾンビ, Zonbi)
Voiced by: Ryo Kato (Japanese); Jarrod Greene (English)
Zombies exist in the Field of Desires, a universe parallel to the human world, as the spirits of humans attempting to satisfy their desires from when they were living. Different zombies are fought throughout the series in a villain of the week-style format.

=== Other characters ===
Chikai Kuji (久慈 誓, Kuji Chikai)
Voiced by: Kenjiro Tsuda (Japanese); Chad Halbrook (English)
Toi's yakuza older brother. His worldview and actions are guided his ardent belief in the survival of the fittest, as demonstrated by his willingness to dispose of anyone he perceives as weak.

Haruka Yasaka (矢逆 春河, Yasaka Haruka)
Voiced by: Rie Kugimiya (Japanese); Alison Viktorin (English)
Kazuki's younger brother, and fan of Sara Azuma. He uses a wheelchair after getting hit by a car, an incident that Kazuki blames himself for.

Otone Jinnai (陣内 音寧, Jinnai Otone)
Voiced by: Mariya Ise (Japanese); Kristen McGuire (English)
Enta's older sister, and teacher to Kazuki and Toi.

== Production ==
=== Conception ===
Ikuhara has stated that his chief inspiration behind Sarazanmai was a desire to create a series about kappas. As the majority of stories about yōkai (supernatural monsters) are fables for children, he wished to create a story about yōkai for an adult audience. The more sensationalistic elements of Sarazanmai's plot, such as the centrality of shirikodama extraction, were intentionally omitted from the series' pitch to improve the series' chances of being greenlit, with Ikuhara stating that "when you make an original anime, you may come up with some really out-there ideas, but the pitch may not get through. That's why you put in the really wacky stuff after it's already been approved."

Ikuhara has additionally stated that he wished to create a series where the primary protagonists were male, in contrast to the female-centric narratives of his previous directorial efforts. The series setting of Asakusa was chosen for its mixture of historical and contemporary elements.

=== Development ===
In August 2017, MAPPA listed a job posting to recruit staff for a "Kunihiko Ikuhara-directed work", effectively announcing the existence of a series to be produced by Ikuhara and the studio. The series was formally announced as Sarazanmai on March 6, 2018, during a three-day Revolutionary Girl Utena marathon on Niconico, with one of three different teaser trailers shown at the end of each respective day of programming. A full-length trailer was released in five parts on Noitamina's YouTube channel, with the first part posted on October 4, 2018, and the final part posted on November 1, 2018.

The eleven-episode series is created by Ikuhara and produced by MAPPA and Lapin Track. The original story is credited to "Ikunirappa" (a portmanteau of "Ikuhara", "Lapin Track", and "MAPPA"), similar to how Ikuhara's previous directorial work Yurikuma Arashi was credited to "Ikunigomamonaka". The primary production staff includes Ikuhara and Teruko Utsumi as script writers, Nobuyuki Takeuchi as chief series director (who previously collaborated with Ikuhara on Utena and Penguindrum); the illustrator Miggy serves as original character designer, while Kayoko Ishikawa adapted the character designs for animation and serves as the chief animation director. The series' closing credits are directed by filmmaker and graphic designer Tao Tajima.

=== Soundtrack ===
The series' soundtrack is composed by Yukari Hashimoto. Sarazanmai features two pieces of theme music: Kana-Boon performs the series' opening theme song "Brand-new", while the Peggies perform the series' ending theme song "Stand By Me". Two original songs are featured in the series, both composed by Hashimoto and written by Ikuhara in Japanese and Dawn M. Barnett in English: Sarazanmai No Uta (さらざんまいのうた, Song of Sarazanmai) and Kawausoiya (カワウソイヤァ, Otterly Sexy). Two soundtracks for the series were released by Aniplex: Sarazanmai Music Collection, which collects the series' original score, and Sarazanmai no Uta/Kawausoiya, which collects the series' original songs.

== Media ==
=== Anime ===
Trailer of the anime

Sarazanmai aired from April 11 to June 20, 2019, on Fuji TV's Noitamina programming block. In English-language markets, Crunchyroll simulcast a subtitled version of the original Japanese version of the series while Funimation simulcast an English-language dubbed version of the series.

| No. | Title | Storyboarded by | Directed by | Original release date |
|---|---|---|---|---|
| 1 | "I Want to Connect, but I Want to Lie" (Japanese: つながりたいけど、偽りたい) | Kunihiko Ikuhara, Nobuyuki Takeuchi, Katsunori Shibata, Maimu Matsushima | Masato Jinbo | April 11, 2019 |
After accidentally breaking a statue of a kappa at a shrine in Asakusa, middle school student Kazuki Yasaka encounters Keppi, heir to the throne of the Kappa Kingdom. He, along with his classmates Toi Kuji and Enta Jinnai, enrage Keppi by calling him a frog; he steals their shirikodama, a mythical organ located in the anus that stores an individual's desires, and transforms them into kappas. Keppi informs them they must defeat a zombie by extracting its shirikodama in order to become human again. They are successful, but the act of "sarazanmai" to transfer the shirikodama to Keppi exposes Kazuki's secret to the group: that he cross-dresses as the idol Sara Azuma. In a post-credits scene, police officers Reo Niiboshi and Mabu Akutsu extract the desires of a man they are questioning.
| 2 | "I Want to Connect, but I Want to Take" (Japanese: つながりたいけど、奪いたい) | Shingo Kaneko | Shingo Kaneko | April 18, 2019 |
Keppi gives the group a Dish of Hope as thanks for helping him, which grants one wish to whoever possesses it, and informs them that they can earn more plates by defeating more zombies. Kazuki explains that he cross-dresses for his younger brother Haruka, a fan of Sara's, and that he wishes to earn a dish for him. Toi wishes to earn a dish for his older brother Chikai, a yakuza for whom he sells cannabis. Kazuki and Toi are later forced to pursue Nyantaro, a feral cat cared for by Kazuki and Haruka, after he steals a bag of cannabis from Toi's grow-op. Nyantaro is suddenly captured by a kappa zombie who, upon being defeated, exposes Kazuki's secret that Nyantaro is domestic cat that he stole. In a post-credits scene, Enta encounters a sleeping Kazuki dressed as Sara, and kisses him.
| 3 | "I Want to Connect, but It's Not Meant to Be" (Japanese: つながりたいけど、報われない) | Masato Jinbo | Masato Jinbo | April 25, 2019 |
Enta, who has a crush on Kazuki, wishes to earn a dish so that Kazuki will return to playing soccer with him. Reo and Mabu extract the desires of Otone's boyfriend (who, unbeknownst to her, is a serial killer targeting women) and turn him into a zombie. The group defeats the zombie, exposing the secret of Enta's crush, and causing Otone to forget her boyfriend ever existed. In a post-credits scene, Enta visits Haruka in a hospital, who is revealed to be a wheelchair user.
| 4 | "I Want to Connect, but You're So Far Away" (Japanese: つながりたいけど、そばにいない) | Nobuyuki Takeuchi | Yayoi Takano; Nobuyuki Takeuchi | May 2, 2019 |
Kazuki asks for Toi's help to kidnap Sara and so that he can take her place during a meet-and-greet that Haruka plans to attend. Toi's backstory is revealed through a flashback – after his parents died from suicide upon being conned into crippling debt, the family's soba shop was saved from closure through Chikai's intervention. When a yakuza came to collect the family's debt, he was shot by Toi, which was subsequently covered up by Chikai.
| 5 | "I Want to Connect, but I Can't Be Forgiven" (Japanese: つながりたいけど、許されない) | Kaori Makita | Kaori Makita | May 9, 2019 |
Toi attempts to kidnap Sara, though she evades him by transforming into a kappa, exposing Kazuki's crossdressing to his family. Kazuki reveals that he is adopted, and that he blames himself for Haruka's disability when he was hit by a car after they had a fight. Kazuki's turmoil causes him to fail in defeating the episode's zombie; an angry Keppi subsequently refuses to transform the group back into their human forms.
| 6 | "I Want to Connect, so I'm Not Giving up" (Japanese: つながりたいから、諦めない) | Katsunori Shibata, Noriko Hashimoto | Katsunori Shibata, Noriko Hashimoto | May 16, 2019 |
The group rescue Haruka after he is kidnapped by Reo, and are transformed back into human form. Keppi explains that Reo and Mabu are agents of the Otter Empire, who have been at war with the Kappa Kingdom for generations over the energy of the shirikodama; with the Kappa Kingdom now defeated, the Otter Empire has begun to extract the shirikodama of humans. In a post-credits flashback set during the Otter-Kappa war, Mabu sacrifices himself to protect Reo in battle.
| 7 | "I Want to Connect, but I Want to Betray" (Japanese: つながりたいけど、裏切りたい) | Yoshiyuki Ryunosuke | Noriko Hashimoto | May 23, 2019 |
In a flashback, Mabu is brought back to life with a mechanical heart transplanted by Otter, though Reo believes that Mabu is merely a re-animated facsimile. Chikai's criminal dealings force him to flee the city, and Toi announces that he intends to join his brother. The group agrees to use the dishes to help Chikai, but discover they have been stolen. Upon defeating a kappa zombie, Enta is exposed as having stolen the dishes out of jealously over Kazuki's concern for Toi.
| 8 | "I Want to Connect, but We'll Never Meet Again" (Japanese: つながりたいけど、もう会えない) | Shingo Kaneko, Masayuki Kurosawa | Shingo Kaneko | May 30, 2019 |
Chikai and Toi make preparations to leave the city. Enta returns the Dishes of Hope to Kazuki, but they are confronted by Reo and Mabu, who intend to use the dishes to restore Mabu. Reo shoots Enta, and takes the dishes.
| 9 | "I Want to Connect, but I Can't Express It" (Japanese: つながりたいけど、伝わらない) | Nobuyuki Takeuchi | Nobuyuki Takeuchi | June 6, 2019 |
Keppi transforms a hospitalized Enta into a kappa so that he and Kazuki can recover the dishes. Reo witnesses Otter performing sexually-charged "maintenance" on Mabu's heart; when he intervenes, Otter appears in the form of Reo, and explains that he is a mirror of Reo's inner desires. Meanwhile, Chikai is shot and killed in a confrontation with the yakuza.
| 10 | "I Want to Connect, but I Can't" (Japanese: つながりたいけど、つながれない) | Masayuki Kurosawa, Katsunori Shibata, Shingo Kaneko | Noriko Hashimoto, Shingo Kaneko | June 13, 2019 |
Kazuki, Enta, and Keppi encounter Dark Keppi, the corporeal form of half of Keppi's shirikodama held by the Otter Empire. Otter, having learned of Reo's plan to use the dishes on Mabu, transforms Mabu into a zombie. Keppi transforms Reo into a kappa, who recovers Mabu's shirikodama and learns that Otter forced Mabu into giving up his connection with Reo in order to live. Mabu tells Reo that he loves him, causing his mechanical heart to explode. A grieving Reo attacks Kazuki, Enta, and Keppi, but is shot and killed by Toi, who wishes to use the dishes to bring Chikai back to life. Kazuki uses the dishes to save Enta's life, and Toi is absorbed by Dark Keppi.
| 11 | "I Want to Connect, so Sarazanmai" (Japanese: つながりたいから、さらざんまい) | Kunihiko Ikuhara, Maimu Matsushima | Kunihiko Ikuhara, Maimu Matsushima | June 20, 2019 |
Toi begins to destroy his connection to Kazuki and Enta, but ultimately chooses to preserve it. Keppi fuses with Dark Keppi, with assistance from the group and a revived Reo and Mabu, and defeats Otter and the concepts it represents. Upon performing sarazanmai, Kazuki, Toi, and Enta foresee a potential future in which their connections to each other are eventually severed. In the aftermath, Toi is sent to juvenile detention for three years. Upon his release, he jumps off of the Azuma Bridge, but is rescued by Kazuki and Enta. The three happily run "off to the future" together.

==== Physical media ====
Aniplex released Sarazanmai across six volumes, in DVD and Blu-ray media formats.

Aniplex (Japan, Region 2)
| Volume | Episodes | Release date | Ref. |
|---|---|---|---|
| Volume 1 | 1 | June 26, 2019 | |
| Volume 2 | 2-3 | July 24, 2019 | |
| Volume 3 | 4-5 | August 28, 2019 | |
| Volume 4 | 6-7 | September 25, 2019 | |
| Volume 5 | 8-9 | October 30, 2019 | |
| Volume 6 | 10-11 | November 27, 2019 | |

=== Manga ===
==== Sarazanmai: Reo and Mabu ====
A spin–off manga series, Sarazanmai: Reo and Mabu (レオとマブ～ふたりはさらざんまい, Reo to Mabu: Futari wa Sarazanmai; lit. Reo and Mabu: Together They're Sarazanmai) was published from May 22, 2018, to March 22, 2019. The series was written by Ikuhara (credited as Ikunirappa) with artwork by Misaki Saitō. It was published in Gentosha's manga magazine RuTile on odd-numbered months, and in the online magazine RuTile Sweet on even-numbered months. The complete series was collected into a tankōbon published by Gentosha on March 22, 2019. Seven Seas Entertainment released an English-language translation of the series as Sarazanmai: Reo and Mabu on May 12, 2020.

The manga follows Reo and Mabu after they discover a baby lying in the street on a plate that can only speak the sound "でいっしゅ" ("dish"). They care for her while searching for her parents, giving her the name her Sara (サラ or sara literally meaning "plate" in Japanese). Reo and Mabu encounter various comedic and absurd scenarios throughout the series, many of which are solved by Sara's intervention, who Reo and Mabu come to believe has magical powers. They eventually come to love Sara as their own daughter, and privately hope that her parents will not be discovered. In the penultimate chapter, Sara suddenly grows up into an adult, thanks Reo and Mabu for being her fathers, and disappears with a man who previously sleepwalked into the kōban. Reo and Mabu suddenly both wake up to find Sara still with them as a baby, with an unspecified amount of the events of the manga having merely been a dream.

| No. | Original release date | Original ISBN | English release date | English ISBN |
|---|---|---|---|---|
| 1 | March 22, 2018 | 978-4-344-84420-9 | May 12, 2020 | 978-1-64505-538-9 |
Chapter 1: Reo and Mabu encounter Sara.; Chapter 2: Reo and Mabu adjust to caring for Sara.; Chapter 3: Reo and Mabu enter a contest to win an air conditioner.; Chapter 4: Mabu tries to make a perfect ningyo-yaki.; Chapter 5: Reo and Mabu embrace being Sara's fathers.; Chapter 6: Reo and Mabu help a runaway child find his lost hat.; Chapter 7: A city official tells Reo and Mabu that they cannot adopt Sara.; Chapter 8: Reo and Mabu help a foreign tourist whose suitcase was stolen.; Chapter 9: Reo receives a large number of lost plates.; Chapter 10: Reo and Mabu help a man who sleepwalked into their kōban.; Chapter 11: Reo and Mabu dream that a grown-up Sara vanishes with the sleepwalking man.

==== Sarazanmai Official Anthology ====
Sarazanmai Official Anthology, a manga anthology, was published by RuTile on January 30, 2020. The anthology features works from several of Ikuhara's current and former collaborators, including Sarazanmai: Reo and Mabu artist Misaki Saitō; Revolutionary Girl Utena co-creator and Be-Papas member Chiho Saitou; Penguindrum co-creator Lily Hoshino; Yurikuma Arashi co-creator Akiko Morishima; and Nokemono to Hanayome co-creator Asumiko Nakamura. Additional contributors include manga artists Mataaki Off, Samata Techno, Akira Kasukabe, Yamamoto Kotetsuko, Akari Funato, and Riyo. The anthology has also been licensed in English by Seven Seas Entertainment.

==== Sarazanmai ====
A manga adaptation of the anime series written by Ikuhara and illustrated by Miggy began serialization on the digital distribution platform Comic Boost on May 19, 2019.

=== Other media ===
A two-volume light novel adaptation of Sarazanmai, written by Ikuhara and Utsumi with illustrations by Miggy, was published by Gentosha. The first volume was released on April 16, 2019, and the second volume was released on August 7, 2019. North American licensing rights to the novels were acquired by Seven Seas Entertainment in February 2020, with the first volume slated for release on September 1, 2020.

PreZanmai, a radio program hosted by series creator Kunihiko Ikuhara and Keppi voice actor Junichi Suwabe, aired from January 5, 2019, to June 28, 2019. The series was broadcast Saturdays at 9 p.m. online and on A&G Plus in Japan.

A Twitter account, @keeponly1luv, posted daily in-character tweets from Reo and Mabu from November 11, 2018, to March 31, 2019. The account's tweets were deleted on June 13, 2019, following the release of episode 10 of the anime series. A book collecting the tweets was published by Noitamina, and was released at Comiket in August 2019.

A stage play that adapts the anime series, Sara ni Sarazanmai: Ai to Yokubō no Stage (Sarazanmai Once More: A Stage of Love and Desire) was announced on September 12, 2019. The play was directed and written by Naohiro Ise and supervised by Ikuhara, and was staged at Theater 1010 in Tokyo from November 28 to December 1, 2019, and at the Cool Japan Park Osaka in Osaka on December 7 and 8, 2019. Teiko Kagohara, who voiced Sara Azuma in the anime series, reprised her role for the stage play.

== Themes and references ==
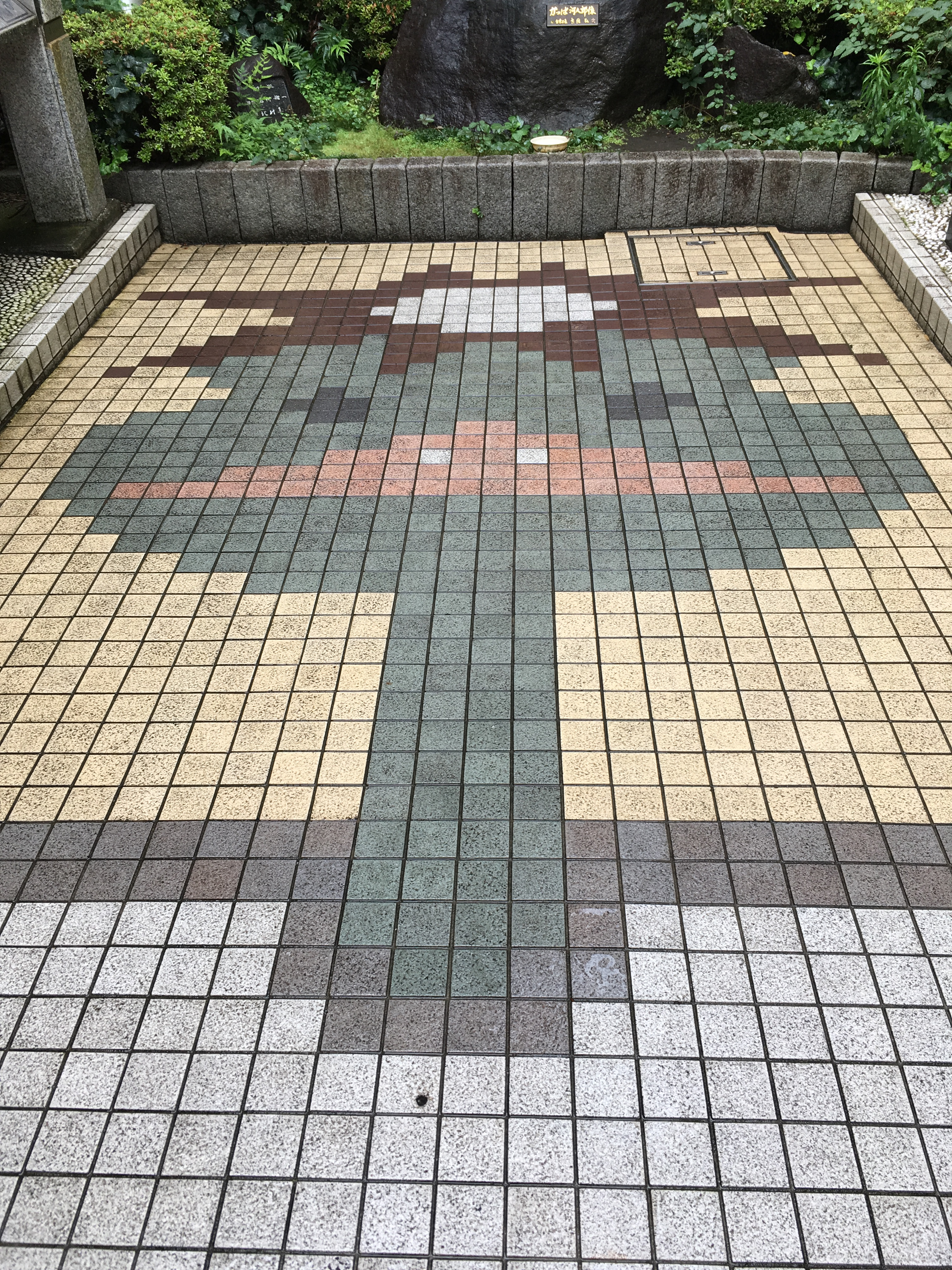
A mosaic of a kappa at a plaza in Kappabashi-dori, Tokyo, which appears as a central plot device in the series.

The primary theme of Sarazanmai is "connections". Quoting Ikuhara in an interview with Pash! Plus:

"We live in an age where, with our smart phones and social media, connecting with people is a daily activity – so I wanted to ask, what does that all mean? What do we want to do with it? And made those questions a central theme of this series, and I wanted to look at things like how there's this conflicting mix of emotions where you have this desire to connect with someone, but that connection can also bring pain. If you maintain the connection, where does it go from there? What happens to connections that are lost? Do we even need connections?"

Similarly to Ikuhara's previous works, the thematic content of Sarazanmai is in direct reference to major world events and systems. Sarazanmai was inspired in part by the 2011 Tōhoku earthquake and tsunami, which informed the series' focus on materialism; in an interview with the Japan Post, Ikuhara stated that the disaster was a lesson in how "material things can be damaged and are not eternal. I have a feeling that young people have a desire to connect with each other instead of a desire for material things." The series' anti-consumerism stance is most overly expressed through the kappa zombies, which revolve around specific objects delivered by "Kappazon", an Amazon analogue.

Consequently, Sarazanmai makes explicit the theme of anti-capitalism, which critic Gabriella Ekens described as having "operated below the surface of Ikuhara's earlier shows, but never quite risen to the level of explicit text". Ekens argues that the series' anti-capitalist message manifests along three major plot elements: Reo and Mabu's subservience to the Otter Empire as an expression of capitalism's selective elevation of people from marginalized groups to positions of authority; Chikai's Faustian bargain with capital to save his family leading to his demise; and Kappazon and the Otter Empire representing capitalism's tendency towards monopolization and exploitation.

The word "Sarazanmai" is derived from the word sara (サラ, "plate"), referring to the plates located on heads of kappas from which they supposedly draw their power, and the suffix -zanmai (ざんまい), referring to indulgence. It is also a close variation of sarasanmai ("three plates"), a reference to the three primary characters who are turned into kappas. The series' setting of Asakusa and Ueno is the location of Kappabashi-dori ("Kitchen Town"), its name a pun for the area's proliferation of kappa imagery and dishware wholesalers.

== Reception ==
Sarazanmai was positively received by critics, and was listed as one of the best series of the spring 2019 anime season by James Beckett and Christopher Farris in Anime News Network's quarterly anime season ratings. In his review of the series for Kotaku, critic Christopher Lee Inoa praised Sarazanmai as Ikuhara's "most optimistic, streamlined and realistic (yes, really) series to date". Inoa characterizes the series as "a positive step forward for Ikuhara's career after the messy Yurikuma Arashi," noting that despite Sarazanmai being a shorter series, the production issues and compressed storytelling of Yurikuma Arashi are not present. In their review of the series for Comic Book Resources, critic Reuben Baron praised the series' animation, calling it "by far the most impressive Ikuhara-made anime from a strictly animation-based perspective" outside of his 1999 film Adolescence of Utena, and specifically noted its positive portrayal of gay characters.

Reviewing the series for Anime News Network, critic Gabriella Ekens described Sarazanmai as "a fantastic show" but qualified the series as "my least favorite within [Ikuhara's] oeuvre," calling it "his least complex and most technically flawed work". While Ekens praises the series' thematic material, she charges that Sarazanmai retreads subjects explored in Ikuhara's previous works, characterizing the series as "repetitious, even more so than Ikuhara's previous output [...] on the highest level of overt text, it's kind of just a pared down version of what's become Ikuni's archetypal narrative."
