= Adolescence of Utena =

1999 film by Kunihiko Ikuhara

- Japanese film poster

Japanese name
- Kanji: 少女革命ウテナ アドゥレセンス黙示録
- Literal meaning: Revolutionary Girl Utena: Adolescence Apocalypse
Transcriptions
- Revised Hepburn: Shōjo Kakumei Utena Aduresensu Mokushiroku
- Directed by: Kunihiko Ikuhara
- Screenplay by: Yōji Enokido
- Based on: Revolutionary Girl Utena by Be-Papas
- Produced by: Yūji Matsukura; Atsushi Moriyama
- Starring: Tomoko Kawakami; Yuriko Fuchizaki; Takehito Koyasu; Takeshi Kusao; Aya Hisakawa; Kumiko Nishihara; Mitsuhiro Oikawa
- Cinematography: Toyomitsu Nakajō
- Edited by: Shigeru Nishiyama
- Music by: Shinkichi Mitsumune; J.A. Seazer
- Production company: J.C.Staff
- Distributed by: Toei Company
- Release date: August 14, 1999
- Running time: 87 minutes
- Country: Japan
- Language: Japanese
- Box office: $351,123 (Note: 2026 North American re-release)

Adolescence of Utena (Note: Known in Japan as Revolutionary Girl Utena: Adolescence Apocalypse (少女革命ウテナ アドゥレセンス黙示録, Shōjo Kakumei Utena Aduresensu Mokushiroku)) is a 1999 Japanese animated romantic fantasy film. It is a follow-up to the 1997 anime television series Revolutionary Girl Utena, created by the artist collective Be-Papas. The film is directed by Kunihiko Ikuhara, written by Yōji Enokido based on a story by Ikuhara and produced by the animation studio J.C.Staff. An English-language dubbed version of the film produced by Central Park Media was released in 2001 as Revolutionary Girl Utena: The Movie.

The plot follows Utena Tenjou, a tomboy high school student who is drawn into a series of sword duels to win the hand of Anthy Himemiya, a mysterious student known as the "Rose Bride". The film is noted for its extensive use of metaphor and symbolism; its focus on themes of gender, sexuality and the transition from adolescence to adulthood; and for its more mature subject material relative to the anime series.

== Context ==
Adolescence of Utena is the final of the three primary entries in the Revolutionary Girl Utena media franchise, following the 1996 manga series and the 1997 anime television series. Though there are significant differences in plot execution between the manga, television series, and film, all three tell the same basic story, utilizing the same general narrative trajectory and characters. The series is highly intertextual, with Adolescence of Utena in particular drawing heavily from plot elements and characterization established in the anime series.

== Plot ==
Utena Tenjou, a new student at Ohtori Academy, tours the school with classmate Wakaba Shinohara. She observes a fencing match between students Juri Arisugawa and Miki Kaoru, and shortly thereafter encounters her ex-boyfriend Touga Kiryuu; after Touga departs, she discovers a rose-engraved signet ring identical to one he was wearing resting inside a white rose. Utena wanders into a rose garden and meets Anthy Himemiya, the sister of the school's absent chairman Akio Ohtori. She is referred to as the "Rose Bride" by Kyouichi Saionji, another rose-ringed student who sees Utena's ring and challenges her to a sword duel. Utena emerges victorious using a sword she pulls out of Anthy's chest.

That night, Anthy visits Utena's dormitory and attempts to initiate sex with her, but is rebuffed. When Utena questions Anthy about the duel and the rings, Anthy responds that the rings mark their bearers as duelists, that she is betrothed to whomever is the victor of the duels, and that whoever possesses the Rose Bride has the "power to revolutionize the world". Elsewhere, Juri's childhood friend Shiori Takatsuki tells Touga that as a child, her "prince" died attempting to save a drowning girl. They receive a phone call from Akio, who says that Anthy is a witch who made the lord of the flies into a prince, but when her magic faded, the prince returned to his true form; the duels are organized in an attempt to reactivate her magic. Juri, who is manipulated by Shiori into dueling Utena, is defeated after witnessing Utena seemingly transform into Anthy's prince.

The school's broadcasting club uncovers a video that suggests that Anthy was previously drugged and raped by Akio. Akio's corpse is found buried in Anthy's garden shortly thereafter, shocking the school with the revelation that he is long dead. A second video depicts Anthy lucid during her rape, which prompted a panicked Akio to stab her and accidentally fall out of a window to his death. Utena searches for Anthy and finds Touga; she suddenly remembers that Touga is the "prince" referenced by Shiori, and that he died while saving Juri from drowning when they were children. Utena thanks Touga for being her "prince", and he vanishes. Utena finds Anthy and tells her they should go "to the outside world", upon which Utena is swallowed by a car wash and metamorphosed into a car. Anthy enters the car and drives it away from the academy, though a fleet of tanks and Shiori – also in car form – attempt to thwart her. Anthy is assisted in her escape by Juri, Miki, Saionji, and Wakaba, who have been inspired by Utena and Anthy to also go to the "outside world". An apparition of Akio attempts to stop Anthy, but she rebukes him in a burst of roses. Utena and Anthy emerge riding the remnants of the car, and kiss as they drive into a grey wasteland, with a blue sky above the clouds.

== Cast ==
Character name	Japanese voice actor	English voice actor
Utena Tenjou (天上 ウテナ, Tenjō Utena)	Tomoko Kawakami	Rachael Lillis
Anthy Himemiya (姫宮 アンシー, Himemiya Anshī)	Yuriko Fuchizaki	Sharon Becker
Touga Kiryuu (桐生 冬芽, Kiryū Tōga)	Takehito Koyasu	Crispin Freeman
Juri Arisugawa (有栖川 樹璃, Arisugawa Juri)	Kotono Mitsuishi	Mandy Bonhomme
Miki Kaoru (薫 幹, Kaoru Miki)	Aya Hisakawa	Jimmy Zoppi
Kyouichi Saionji (西園寺 莢一, Saionji Kyōichi)	Takeshi Kusao	Jack Taylor
Shiori Takatsuki (高槻 枝織, Takatsuki Shiori)	Kumiko Nishihara	Lisa Ortiz
Kozue Kaoru (薫 梢, Kaoru Kozue)	Chieko Honda	Roxanne Beck
Wakaba Shinohara (篠原 若葉, Shinohara Wakaba)	Yuka Imai	Roxanne Beck
Nanami Kiryuu (桐生 七実, Kiryū Nanami)	Yuri Shiratori	Leah Applebaum
Kanae Ohtori (鳳 香苗, Ōtori Kanae)	Ai Orikasa	Kerry Williams
Shadow Girl C-Ko (影絵少女C子)	Kumiko Watanabe	Roxanne Beck
Shadow Girl E-Ko (影絵少女E子)	Maria Kawamura	Lisa Ortiz
Shadow Girl F-Ko (影絵少女F子)	Satomi Koorogi	Mandy Bonhomme
Akio Ohtori (鳳 暁生, Ōtori Akio)	Mitsuhiro Oikawa	Josh Mosby

Director Kunihiko Ikuhara makes a cameo appearance in the film as the voice of an art teacher; in the English-language dubbed version of the film, the role is voiced by Tony Salerno, who served as ADR director on the Central Park Media dub.

== Production ==
Adolescence of Utena was produced by J.C.Staff, in association with the publishing company Shogakukan and the production company GANSIS. The production committee for the film, Shojo Kakumei Utena Seisaku Iinkai (lit. "Revolutionary Girl Utena Production Committee"), was composed of Sega Enterprises, MOVIC, and King Records. Distribution of the film was overseen by Toei Company.

=== Development ===
Adolescence of Utena was developed by Be-Papas, the artist collective founded by Ikuhara that produced the Utena anime television series. Ikuhara expressed a desire to create a film that heightened the themes and subject material of the original anime, seeking to "do in the movie what I wasn't able to accomplish in the TV series," and jokingly stated that he wished for Adolescence of Utena to be "more naughty than the TV series."

In contrast to the ensemble cast structure of the anime series, Adolescence of Utena focuses chiefly on the characters Utena and Anthy, with much of the secondary cast relegated to supporting and cameo appearances. The film's version of Utena is depicted as more masculine, appearing initially in short hair and boys' clothing, while Anthy is more strong-willed and overtly sexual; the romantic subtext of Utena and Anthy's relationship is additionally rendered more explicitly. Be-Papas member Chiho Saito has stated that "characters who weren't treated kindly in the TV show got attention, so I think [the film] was sympathetic in that regard." Saito advocated for a prominent role for Touga in the film, whose backstory is explored in greater detail relative to the television anime series; Ikuhara has stated that Touga's final scene in Adolescence of Utena is Saito's favorite in the series. Conversely, Nanami Kiryuu makes only a cameo appearance in the film as a cow, in a scene inserted by Ikuhara to reference an episode of the anime series and to serve as comic relief.

=== Animation ===
Adolescence of Utena was released on 35 mm movie film, and was created using a combination of traditional and digital animation. The opening title sequence was created by modifying digital graphics through nonlinear composite editing using a supercomputer, a relatively new process for animation at the time. The opening scene depicting the architecture of Ohtori Academy and the dance scene with Utena and Anthy were entirely digitally animated using 3-D Works. Ikuhara had expressed hesitation in using digital animation, stating that computer graphics in anime "tend to be harsh and cold," but expressed satisfaction with the seamless blending of the digital dance scene with the rest of the film's traditional animation. When Adolescence of Utena was remastered in 2011, the digital elements of the dance scene became more apparent when rendered as high-definition video, prompting Ikuhara and colorist Hiroshi Kaneda to exhaustively retransfer the film.

Each scene had multiple designs and art directions rendered; for example, Ikuhara has stated that the scene in which Touga first speaks to Utena was initially rendered entirely in monochrome, but colors were ultimately added to make the scene more visually interesting. Other designs were adapted from elements previously used in the television series, such as Utena's dormitory and the Mikage Seminar hallway sequence, the latter of which was included based on the popularity of Mikage among the series' fans. Animators who specialized in mecha anime were hired to work on the final car chase sequence, with Ikuhara noting that several of the animators expressed initial confusion over why they were being hired to work on an Utena film. The film was not centrally storyboarded, but instead divided among five storyboarders who each supervised a segment of the film. The segments were denoted by letters; Takuya Igarashi, who worked as a storyboard artist on the anime series and supervised storyboards on "part A" of the film, remarked that the storyboards nonetheless maintained cohesion due to Ikuhara's direction.

=== Soundtrack ===
Shinkichi Mitsumune and J. A. Seazer, who respectively produced the score and songs for the Revolutionary Girl Utena anime series, returned to compose the soundtrack for Adolescence of Utena. Mitsumune composed the film's score and arranged its original songs, while Seazer produced the music and lyrics for the film's two duel songs, "Duelist ~ Resurrection! Never-ending History of the 'Middle Ages'" (デュエリスト~甦れ!無窮の歴史「中世」よ, Yomigaere! Mukyuu no Rekishi "Chuusei" yo) and "Naked Rose ~ Carnage ~ Constellations αΨζ Galaxy" (シュラ ―肉体星座αψζ星雲―, Shura ~ Nikutai Seiza Alpha Psi Zeta Seiun~). A rearranged version of "Absolute Destiny Apocalypse" (絶対運命黙示録, Zettai Unmei Mokushiroku), previously written and composed by Seazer for the anime series, also appears in the film.

In addition to the songs produced by Mitsumune and Seazer, two songs produced by Toshiro Yabuki and performed by Masami Okui also appear in the film: "At Times, Love Is..." (時に愛は, Toki ni Ai wa) and "Rondo-Revolution" (輪舞-revolution)", the latter of which served as the theme song for the anime series and is rearranged by Mitsumune for the film. The ending credits theme of the film is "I Want to Be Your Fiancé" (フィアンセになりたい), written and performed by Akio's voice actor Mitsuhiro Oikawa.

== Release ==
Adolescence of Utena was released in theaters in Japan on August 14, 1999. In North America, the film premiered at Anime Expo in Anaheim, California, held from June 30 to July 3, 2000. The film was screened multiple times throughout the convention, with Ikuhara and Saito in attendance for certain screenings. The film was also screened at the 26th San Francisco International Lesbian and Gay Film Festival (with Ikuhara in attendance), the Future Film Festival in Bologna, the National Film Theater in London, and the Museum of Modern Art in New York City. In 2026, the film received a limited release in 378 theaters in North America from June 21-26 and grossed $344,965.

=== Home media ===
In Japan, Adolescence of Utena was released on DVD by King Records on March 3, 2000. The film was released on Blu-ray by King Records on November 15, 2017, as part of complete series box set to commemorate the 20th anniversary of the anime series. In North America, licensing rights to Adolescence of Utena were acquired by Central Park Media on January 31, 2001, which produced Revolutionary Girl Utena: The Movie, an English-language dubbed version of the film. The English voice cast from the dubbed version of the television anime series reprise their roles for the film. The English-language localization of the film was overseen by Ikuhara, who travelled to the United States to oversee the film's translation; Takayuki Karahashi, who translated the film, was personally selected by Ikuhara.

Revolutionary Girl Utena: The Movie was released in North America on DVD and VHS October 23, 2001. The DVD release includes both the original Japanese film and the English dub, while the VHS release includes only the English dub. Broadcasting rights for the film were acquired from Central Park Media by Funimation for its Funimation Channel on April 10, 2007, which first broadcast Revolutionary Girl Utena: The Movie on May 5, 2007. Following Central Park Media's dissolution by bankruptcy in 2009, North American licensing rights for the film were acquired by Right Stuf Inc. on July 3, 2010. The film was re-released as Adolescence of Utena by Nozomi Entertainment, a division of Right Stuf, on DVD on December 6, 2011, and on Blu-ray on December 5, 2017. In Australia, Adolescence of Utena was licensed by Hanabee, which released the film on DVD on November 20, 2013. The film is included with the final volume of Hanabee's three-volume release of the Revolutionary Girl Utena anime television series.

=== Manga ===
A manga adaptation of Adolescence of Utena written and illustrated by Be-Papas member Chiho Saito was serialized from May to September 1999 in the manga magazine Bessatsu Shōjo Comic Special. While the manga is not a one-to-one adaptation of the film, it broadly incorporates its major plot points; Saito has commented that she regards the manga as a more direct story, while the film is more thematic and abstract. As the manga was published in a special edition of Bessatsu Shōjo Comic aimed at a josei audience (older teenage girls and adult women), it maintains a more mature tone relative to the original Revolutionary Girl Utena manga and anime.

An English-language translation of the manga licensed by Viz Media was announced by Saito at Anime Expo in July 2000. The English translation was serialized in Animerica Extra before being published as a collected volume by Viz in November 2004.

=== Other media ===
Mitsumune and Seazer's original soundtrack for the film was released on August 14, 1999, in Japan, and on June 8, 2004, in North America. The Japanese version of the soundtrack was released by King Records, while the North American version was released by Geneon, a division of Pioneer. The Japanese release includes liner notes from Mitsumune and Seazer, while the North American release contains additional liner notes from Ikuhara and Saito. A remastered version of the soundtrack was included as a part of the Revolutionary Girl Utena Complete CD-BOX, released by King Records in Japan on August 27, 2008. An Adolescence of Utena art book, Revolutionary Girl Utena Adolescence Apocalypse: Newtype Illustrated Collection (劇場版 少女革命ウテナアドゥレセンス黙示録), was published by Kadokawa Shoten on March 14, 2000.

== Reception ==
=== Critical reception ===
Adolescence of Utena was positively received by critics. In Anime News Network's ranking of the 100 greatest anime films of all time, Adolescence of Utena placed eighth, with writer Mike Toole calling the film "one of the most interesting anime movies of the '90s and one of the prettiest animated films ever made." Vulture listed the car transformation scene on its list of "The 100 Sequences That Shaped Animation", arguing that "Adolescence of Utena does for the magical-girl anime what Neon Genesis Evangelion did for the mecha anime: lay waste to the rules that came before to craft a bold new language all its own.

Reviewing the film for Dazed, writer Evelyn Wang commends the coherence of the film's discordant elements, categorizing it alongside high-concept films such as Elle and Face/Off that are "would-be shit-shows which quietly attain perfection." Wang offers specific praise for the visual symbolism of the film, saying that "the film isn't just aesthetically pleasing. It's also aesthetically precise." Writing for Calvin University's The Post Calvin, Jacqueline Ristola calls the film an "anime masterwork" and "a unified statement on liberation and personal revolution ... the film exorcises narrative logic for sheer literalization of metaphor, and runs with it whole hog." THEM Anime gave the film three out of five stars, calling the film "quite possibly the most visually beautiful movie I have ever seen," but criticized the climactic car transformation scene. Animefringe offered praise for Adolescence of Utena's visuals and soundtrack, calling the film "sheer beauty."

The manga adaptation of Adolescence of Utena was similarly well received by critics, with Rebecca Silverman of Anime News Network stating that the adaptation is "much better done in general" compared to the Revolutionary Girl Utena manga, and offering praise for its thematic material. Otaku USA noted that the manga adaptation is "much closer to the anime's tone," but "stops short of the extraordinary climax" of Utena transforming into a car. Manga Bookshelf praised the "ethereal quality" of the manga's artwork, and noted that while the title would be best appreciated by readers with existing familiarity of Utena, it nonetheless "carries some significance and effectiveness as a separate work in its own right."

The anime entry in The Encyclopedia of Science Fiction described it as "Densely metaphorical and prioritizing symbolism over plot clarity, this is a beautiful and memorable film that should ideally be watched after the television series".

=== Awards ===
In 2000, Adolescence of Utena won "Best Film, Japanese Release" at the SPJA Awards, given by the Society for the Promotion of Japanese Animation annually at Anime Expo.

== Themes and analysis ==
I wanted to convey the sense of what it means to become an adult. In other words, there are no people with pure hearts in the world of adults. So, what would you do when you realize this? When you realize that the world of adults is a dirty one where no one with a pure heart can live, would you avoid it and remain as a child where you can live in a world of childish and beautiful dreams? Or, would you enter the adult world regardless, even if you knew that it was not a pure world?

— Kunihiko Ikuhara, director and series co-creator,
Adolescence of Utena director's commentary track, 2001

Adolescence of Utena has been noted as a thematically and symbolically dense film, often to a highly surreal and abstract degree, with Animerica Extra calling the film "a bizarre collection of images that could be seen as allegorical, of evidence of a fantastic inner life, or simply symbols for an individual's struggle to find their place in society." Ikuhara has expressed reluctance at ascribing explicit meaning to the themes and symbols of the film, stating that he would instead "like the viewer to decide" what the film represents. He has nonetheless spoken in broad terms about the general artistic intent of the film, particularly around its depiction of Utena's transition from adolescence to adulthood and her "departure from the girl's world of dependence into a grownup's world." The film has been compared by critics to The End of Evangelion, another anime film that similarly focuses on themes of youth, identity, and apocalypse.

=== Car transformation scene ===
The climactic scene of Adolescence of Utena, in which Utena is transformed into a pink sports car that Anthy uses to escape Ohtori Academy, has been the subject of considerable discussion among fans and critics. Ikuhara has stated that he encountered resistance from the film's staff in implementing the scene, but that he wished to create a climax that would make the film memorable, and that would be unique compared to other action-drama films. Beyond this, Ikuhara has declined to offer a more substantive explanation for why Utena is specifically transformed into a car, stating that doing so would "limit the meaning of the story and make it less interesting." He has, however, described the scene in the context of the film's subversion of Utena and Anthy's relationship roles:

"There's the story of Sleeping Beauty, where you have the princess who'd been asleep for a long time who's awakened by the prince. But the Utena character has been the prince from the beginning of this story. So, the idea of Utena being turned into a car suggests that she's being put to sleep. I thought it would be interesting to reverse the roles played by Utena and Anthy in their respective relationships. In other words, Utena's the one who becomes the princess. She's the one forced into sleep. And only Anthy can free Utena from this sleep. That's how things come to an end. I thought it would be very interesting to reverse their roles."

Cars appear as a recurring motif throughout various pieces of Revolutionary Girl Utena media, most notably Akio's sports car in the third story arc of the television series. Ikuhara stated that he drew inspiration from the supercar boom of the 1970s, and how sports cars are "something that satisfies childish desires in the adult world ... my idea of a car is something that is exceedingly close to an adult's toy." Susan J. Napier has argued that the Utena-Car destroying Akio is representative of the series' broader critique of fairy tales and the illusory trappings of shōjo manga, as Utena "becomes literally a vehicle for change" that rejects the dream-like illusions of Ohtori Academy and delivers Anthy and her schoolmates to an enlightened world. Vulture described the scene as "an image of liberation for a minority group that is still beholden to conservative ideals," saying that it was also "resonant in the scope of transgender imagery, where definition of self can allow you to be anyone or anything you wish."

=== Gender and sexuality ===
While any romantic or sexual dimension to the relationship between Utena and Anthy is relegated to subtext in both the manga and anime, Adolescence of Utena renders their relationship much more overtly: they kiss multiple times, and Anthy sexually propositions Utena early in the film. According to Ikuhara, the film's staff were divided over whether to openly depict or merely imply a kiss between Utena and Anthy, but that a kiss was included at his decision. The film has subsequently become popular among fans of yuri (lesbian manga and anime), and is often categorized as LGBT cinema.

Writing for Intersections: Gender, History and Culture in the Asian Context, Sabdha Charlton posits that the categorization of Adolescence of Utena as a lesbian film "reflects a specifically Western desire to interpolate the text into pre-existing notions of lesbianism and same-sex desire." She argues that the film instead seeks "a rejection of dominant discourses of gender and sexuality ... Utena invests in the romantic notion of revolution as being capable of fundamentally changing the world by erasing categories of gender and sexuality, even as it invests in these very categories." Napier adopts a similar position, arguing that the final scene of the film represents "the need for integration of two sides of the self," with the joining of the masculine Utena and the feminine Anthy being "an acknowledgement of the need for an integrate psyche, regardless of gender or sexual orientation."

=== Setting ===
The concept of Ohtori Academy as a metaphorical prison or gilded cage, established in the manga and television anime, is amplified in Adolescence of Utena. The film's version of Ohtori Academy has a surreal appearance, and is inspired by a combination of constructivist, deconstructivist, and Art Nouveau architecture. Storyboard artist Takuya Igarashi describes the appearance of film's version of Ohtori as being "even less grounded in reality" compared to the anime series, noting that "nothing of the outside world can ever be seen. This leaves the strong impression that it's a birdcage or a jail.

Writing for the British Film Institute, Philip Brophy describes the film's Ohtori as "not merely a hermetic social sphere but a Russian doll of interior and disguised realms of sexual conflict and gender multiplicity; its architectural design is a mind-boggling visualization of the school's dimensional mania." Charlton notes that Ohtori is portrayed as "angular, distorted and often shown in long shots which emphasize space and distance." The film's establishing shot of Utena, in which she is backgrounded by unnaturally moving chalkboards, was inserted by Ikuhara to "set the proper tone and to convey to the audience that this is a strange world."

Adolescence of Utena has been alternately interpreted as a stand-alone adaptation of Revolutionary Girl Utena that exists in its own continuity, and as a sequel that is contiguous with the events of the anime series. Charlton conceives of the film as an alternate universe narrative, acknowledging that the film is "difficult to understand without prior knowledge of the storylines and characterisations of the series. This means that comparisons between the two are inevitable." Conversely, critic Vrai Kaiser argues that the contiguous nature of these plot and character elements, notably the assertive personality Anthy has developed by the end of the anime series, is evidence of the film's sequel status, noting that the film "opens on almost the exact point where the series ends, encouraging a savvy viewer to draw the two together ... Anthy's reactions throughout the film make much more sense if viewed with the lens that she's the same Anthy from the TV series."
