= List of Revolutionary Girl Utena episodes =

The anime series Revolutionary Girl Utena was produced by the Japanese animation studio J.C.Staff and directed by Kunihiko Ikuhara. The series aired between April 2, 1997, and December 24, 1997, on TV Tokyo in Japan and spanned 39 episodes.

== Episode list ==
=== Student Council Saga ===
The Student Council Saga begins with Utena Tenjou challenging Kyouichi Saionji to a duel. He thought the love letter Utena's friend Wakaba wrote to him was stupid, and threw it in the trash. Someone, possibly Saionji himself or another student, posted it on the school wall. Utena, assuming Saionji the perpetrator, angrily confronts him about his behavior. She challenges him to a kendo duel; he, seeing the Rose Signet on her hand, accepts a real duel. Each Duelist was given a rose crest ring by the End of the World. Utena also has a rose crest, but hers came from a prince she met when she was very young. By accepting the duel and defeating Saionji, Utena becomes engaged to Anthy Himemiya, the Rose Bride.

Anthy and Utena move into a dormitory together. Saionji comes to the dorms, and physically abuses Anthy for "betraying" him. He demands a rematch against Utena, claiming that he was careless the first time. Utena thinks the duels are stupid, and declares to Anthy that she will deliberately lose. However, Utena is unable to stand the thought of Anthy being abused by Saionji. Motivated by the chance to protect Anthy, Utena wins the duel.

As Utena fights the Student Council members one by one, her relationship with Anthy strengthens. After Saionji, she duels against Miki, Juri and Nanami, defeating all of them. Before fighting Utena, Touga uses his charm and skills at manipulation to make her doubt herself, and is thus able to defeat her. After Utena regains her confidence, she wins a rematch against him, regaining her title as the Champion Duelist.

No.	Title	Storyboarder(s)	Directed by	Written by	Animation supervisor(s)	Original release date
1	"The Rose Bride"; Transliteration: "Bara no hanayome" (Japanese: 薔薇の花嫁)	Kunihiko Ikuhara	Tōru Takahashi	Yōji Enokido	Shinya Hasegawa	April 2, 1997
Eight-year-old, orphaned Utena is rescued from her sadness by a mysterious prince who gives her a Rose Signet ring. He promises that the Ring will lead her to him again someday if she never loses her inherent nobility. Utena is so inspired by the unnamed prince that she decides to become a prince herself. Six years later, 14-year-old Utena attends Ohtori Academy and is in 8th grade, where her noble aspirations lead her to accidentally enter the Dueling Game and become engaged to the cryptic Rose Bride Anthy.
2	"For Whom the Rose Smiles"; Transliteration: "Ta ga tame ni bara wa hohoemu" (Japanese: 誰がために薔薇は微笑む)	Shingo Kaneko	Shingo Kaneko	Yōji Enokido	Hiroshi Nagahama	April 9, 1997
As the Rose Bride, Anthy is said to obey whomever she is engaged to without question. It is said that the one who wins the duels and possesses the Rose Bride will gain the "Power to Revolutionize the World". Anthy moves in with Utena, much to the latter's chagrin, because despite the power possessing Anthy might give her, Utena cannot bear the thought of participating in a "game" where students fight for control over a classmate's life. She resolves to lose her next duel on purpose, but an encounter with Anthy's former master causes her to question her decision.
3	"On the Night of the Ball"; Transliteration: "Butōkai no yoru ni" (Japanese: 舞踏会の夜に)	Kazuhisa Takenouchi	Takashi Watanabe	Yōji Enokido	Naomi Miyata	April 16, 1997
Utena tries to convince Anthy to make more friends, and fights off Student Council President Touga's romantic advances. Utena and Anthy ultimately decide to go to the school's masked ball, but Touga's little sister Nanami, jealous of Touga's attention, has laid a trap for Anthy there.
4	"The Sunlit Garden – Prelude"; Transliteration: "Hikari sasu niwa – Pureryūdo" (Japanese: 光さす庭・プレリュード)	Tōru Takahashi	Tōru Takahashi	Yōji Enokido	Hiromi Katō	April 23, 1997
Miki, a troubled 13-year-old 7th-grade genius estranged from his twin sister, falls in love with Anthy. He unconsciously connects her to the innocent past that he lost. He and Nanami go to visit Anthy and Utena.
5	"The Sunlit Garden – Finale"; Transliteration: "Hikari sasu niwa – Fināre" (Japanese: 光さす庭・フィナーレ)	Hiroshi Nishikiori	Shingo Kaneko	Yōji Enokido	Masahiro Aizawa	April 30, 1997
Miki denies wanting to duel for control over Anthy's life, but subtle manipulation from Touga and another surprising player make him greatly fearful for the traits he loves in her.
6	"Take Care, Miss Nanami!"; Transliteration: "Nanami-sama go-yōjin!" (Japanese: 七実様御用心！)	Jun Matsumoto	Yukio Okazaki	Ryōta Yamaguchi (Note: Ryōta Yamaguchi is credited on all episodes he worked on under the pseudonym "Noboru Higa" (比賀昇).)	Akemi Hayashi	May 7, 1997
Nanami is sure that someone is trying to kill her. After jumping to the conclusion that it's her brother Touga, Nanami is saved from a runaway horse by a 10-year-old 4th-grader Mitsuru Tsuwabuki, whom she takes as a servant and bodyguard. NOTE: Originally intended as episode 8, but swapped due to intended episode 6 "Curried High Trip" falling behind schedule, causing minor continuity errors, such as when the exchange diary was actually revealed.
7	"Unfulfilled Juri"; Transliteration: "Mihatenu Juri" (Japanese: 見果てぬ樹璃)	Mamoru Hosoda (Note: Mamoru Hosoda is credited on all episodes he worked on under the pseudonym "Katsuyo Hashimoto" (橋本カツヨ).)	Yukio Okazaki	Yōji Enokido	Akemi Hayashi	May 14, 1997
Despite being the head of the fencing team and a Student Council member with one of the most feared and admired personalities in the school, Juri has become a very cynical and bitter person. She resents and mistrusts Anthy and adamantly denies the power of miracles. Utena's idealism comes in conflict with Juri's still-raw wounds.
8	"Curried High Trip"; Transliteration: "Karē naru Haitorippu" (Japanese: カレーなるハイトリップ)	Satoshi Nishimura	Akihiko Nishiyama	Ryōta Yamaguchi	Akira Takeuchi	May 21, 1997
A mishap in home economics causes Utena and Anthy to switch bodies. In the Rose Bride's body, Utena fights off Anthy's bullies and Saionji's advances while Nanami goes on a long journey to find a cure. NOTE: Originally intended as episode 6, but after falling behind schedule, was swapped with intended episode 8 "Take Care, Miss Nanami!", causing minor continuity errors, such as when the exchange diary was actually revealed.
9	"The Castle Said to Hold Eternity"; Transliteration: "Eien ga aru toiu shiro" (Japanese: 永遠があるという城)	Takuya Igarashi (Note: Takuya Igarashi is credited on all episodes he worked on under the pseudonym "Jūgo Kazayama" (風山十五).)	Takuya Igarashi	Yōji Enokido	Megumi Kadonosono	May 28, 1997
A flashback depicting the origins of Saionji's controlling, depressed personality also reveals the dark nature of Utena's childhood. Violating the rules of the dueling game, Saionji kidnaps Anthy and takes her to the arena. Utena must rush to her aid. When she is saved Saionji attacks Utena and cuts Touga instead, and as a result gets expelled.
10	"Nanami's Precious Thing"; Transliteration: "Nanami no taisetsu na mono" (Japanese: 七実の大切なもの)	Jun Matsumoto	Katsushi Sakurabi (Note: On episode 10 only, Katsushi Sakurabi is credited with both names written in hiragana (さくらびかつし); on all other episodes he worked on, his family name is written in kanji (桜美かつし).)	Ryōta Yamaguchi	Hisashi Kagawa	June 4, 1997
Nanami's worship of her big brother Touga leads her to despise rivals for his affection. As Utena suffers over her inability to defend herself last episode, Touga's intentions become more sinister and the End of the World chooses Nanami to duel with Utena.
11	"Gracefully Cruel – The One Who Picks That Flower"; Transliteration: "Yūga ni reikoku – Sono hana wo tsumu mono" (Japanese: 優雅に冷酷・その花を摘む者)	Hiroshi Nishikiori, Shingo Kaneko	Shingo Kaneko	Kazuhiro Uemura	Masahiro Aizawa	June 11, 1997
Touga impersonates Utena's prince in order to capitalize on her internal conflict and insecurity. Utena's self-doubt leads her to lose a duel to Touga, and he takes possession of the Rose Bride.
12	"For Friendship, Perhaps"; Transliteration: "Tabun yūjō no tame" (Japanese: たぶん友情のために)	Nagashi Tare	Tōru Takahashi	Kazuhiro Uemura	Hiroshi Nagahama, Shinya Hasegawa	June 18, 1997
Shattered over the loss of the duel and Anthy, Utena goes to school dressed like a girl and falls into deep depression. When Wakaba persuades Utena to get back on her feet, she challenges Touga to a rematch, and an unexpected reaction from Anthy changes the outcome of the duel.

=== Black Rose Saga ===
After defeating all of the Student Council members, another obstacle appears before Utena with the opening of the Mikage Seminar. Presided over by Souji Mikage, it is seemingly a place for student counseling. But once people reveal their problems and inner turmoil to Mikage, he uses his powers to put them under his control, turning them into Black Rose duelists and sending them to fight duels against Utena in the Arena. His objective is to kill Anthy and install a boy, Mamiya Chida, as the Rose Bride instead. His efforts are in vain, as not one of them can defeat Utena.

Mikage's victims included Kanae Ohtori, Kozue Kaoru, Shiori Takatsuki, Mitsuru Tsuwabuki, Wakaba Shinohara, and Keiko Sonoda.

After being forced to fight even her best friend to protect Anthy, an enraged Utena challenges Mikage in order to end his schemes once and for all. After she defeats him, Akio tells him his role in his plot was already fulfilled, and disposes of him. In the process, it is implied that Mamiya was somehow a disguised Anthy, helping Akio to manipulate Mikage. The real Mamiya is long dead, as is Mikage.

No.	Title	Storyboarder(s)	Directed by	Written by	Animation supervisor(s)	Original release date
13	"Tracing a Path"; Transliteration: "Egakareru kiseki" (Japanese: 描かれる軌跡)	Tōru Takahashi	Tōru Takahashi	Yōji Enokido	Takao Abo	June 25, 1997
Two men review Utena's duels and the motivations of all the Duelists.
14	"The Boys of the Black Rose"; Transliteration: "Kurobara no Shōnen-tachi" (Japanese: 黒薔薇の少年たち)	Mamoru Hosoda	Yukio Okazaki	Yōji Enokido	Akemi Hayashi	July 2, 1997
Anthy reveals that she pays weekly visits to her brother Akio, the acting headmaster of the school — but the relationship between the siblings is far from ordinary. Akio is engaged to high-school student Kanae, daughter of the ill headmaster. Kanae loves Akio deeply, but feels distant from him and cannot bring herself to like Anthy. Meanwhile, the Black Rose Seminar appears in Ohtori Academy, led by "high-school" genius Mikage as a front for creating Duelists capable of defeating Utena. Instead of winning Anthy, he wants to kill and replace her with an ill boy in order to save his life. Mikage preys upon Kanae's fears to create the first Black Rose Duelist.
15	"The Landscape Framed by Kozue"; Transliteration: "Sono Kozue ga Sasu Fuukei" (Japanese: その梢が指す風景)	Takafumi Hoshikawa	Takafumi Hoshikawa	Yōji Enokido	Nobuyuki Takeuchi	July 9, 1997
Kozue dates many male students in order to keep the attention of her twin brother Miki. Her love for him borders on desperate obsession and is tainted by their troubled past. Mikage and Mamiya decide that the best way to defeat Utena is to create Duelists who have holds on the Student Council members' hearts, enabling them to steal their respective dueling swords from their bodies and use them to fight. Kozue and Miki become the first victims of this experiment.
16	"The Cowbell of Happiness"; Transliteration: "Shiawase no Kauberu" (Japanese: 幸せのカウベル)	Hiroshi Nishikiori	Shigeo Koshi	Ryōta Yamaguchi	Yoshiaki Tsubata	July 16, 1997
Nanami receives a golden cowbell. Thinking that it's expensive designer jewelry, she wears it everywhere until she begins to turn into a cow.
17	"The Thorns of Death"; Transliteration: "Shi no Toge" (Japanese: 死の棘)	Jun Matsumoto	Katsushi Sakurabi	Ryōe Tsukimura	Hisashi Kagawa	July 23, 1997
Shiori, the catalyst for Juri's broken state of mind, transfers back into Ohtori. The two of them have a tumultuous love-hate relationship, and Shiori finds out the real reason why she can make Juri suffer. Both elated and traumatized by this revelation, Shiori pays a visit to Mikage, who exploits her deep-seated insecurities.
18	"Mitsuru's Impatience"; Transliteration: "Mitsuru Modokashisa" (Japanese: みつるもどかしさ)	Satoshi Nishimura	Yukio Okazaki	Ryōta Yamaguchi	Akemi Hayashi	July 30, 1997
Elementary schooler Mitsuru is desperate to become an adult so that he may get close to Nanami. His increasingly desperate attempts to enter the grown-up world of love and sexuality lead him to Mikage.
19	"A Song for a Kingdom Now Lost"; Transliteration: "Ima ha Naki Ōkoku no Uta" (Japanese: 今は亡き王国の歌)	Takuya Igarashi	Tōru Takahashi	Takuya Igarashi	Masahiro Aizawa	August 6, 1997
When Wakaba was little, she had a friend who protected her from bullies. Now, Tatsuya has transferred back, and it appears that the two of them are in love. When it turns out that this romance is actually a misunderstanding, Tatsuya ends up at the Mikage Seminar, but Mikage treats him differently from other students who visit.
20	"Wakaba Flourishing"; Transliteration: "Wakaba Shigereru" (Japanese: 若葉繁れる)	Mamoru Hosoda	Katsushi Sakurabi	Ryōe Tsukimura	Nobuyuki Takeuchi	August 13, 1997
It turns out that Saionji has been staying in Wakaba's room ever since he was expelled. Saionji treats her uncharacteristically well, and Wakaba is elated at having Saionji all to herself. Mikage and Anthy conspire to reverse Saionji's expulsion and stoke frustration in Wakaba. Fearing she will never be "special", Wakaba is tearfully driven to the Mikage Seminar.
21	"Vermin"; Transliteration: "Warui Mushi" (Japanese: 悪い虫)	Hiroaki Sakurai	Hiroaki Sakurai	Ryōe Tsukimura	Kunihiro Abe	August 20, 1997
Nanami's lackeys Keiko, Aiko and Yuko all have crushes on Touga, and that is the reason that they submit to her every whim. When Nanami forbids Keiko to go to a school party, Keiko accidentally finds Touga in the forest and shares her umbrella with him. Nanami catches her in the act and ostracizes her in jealousy, sending a vengeful Keiko to the Mikage Seminar.
22	"Nemuro Memorial Hall"; Transliteration: "Nemuro Kinenkan" (Japanese: 根室記念館)	Jun Matsumoto	Hayato Date	Yōji Enokido	Yoshiaki Tsubata	August 27, 1997
In a flashback, Professor Nemuro is an 18-year-old prodigy who, in spite of his intelligence, feels no emotions for anyone or anything. He is hired by Ohtori Academy to lead a research team of 100 boys to discover the secret of eternity. When he becomes close to his supervisor Tokiko and her terminally-ill brother Mamiya, Nemuro finally feels the value of human life and throws himself enthusiastically into his research, but events orchestrated by the End of the World destroy everything he believes in and lead him to become Mikage.
23	"The Terms of a Duelist"; Transliteration: "Dyuerisuto no Jōken" (Japanese: デュエリストの条件)	Mamoru Hosoda	Yukio Okazaki	Yōji Enokido	Akemi Hayashi	September 3, 1997
Now out of potential Duelists and down to a single black rose, Mikage is tormented by his memories and apparent delusions. He connects Utena to Tokiko and goads her into challenging him to a duel. Mikage hopes to defeat her, save Mamiya and conquer his painful past. During the duel, he realizes that the End of the World has again deluded and manipulated him, but the realization comes too late.
24	"The Secret Nanami Diary"; Transliteration: "Nanami-sama Himitsu Nikki" (Japanese: 七実様秘密日記)	Jun Matsumoto	Tōru Takahashi	Ryōta Yamaguchi	Takao Abo	September 10, 1997
Tsuwabuki's secret diary is discovered, chronicling recent events in Nanami's life and listing at least 24 of Tsuwabuki's plans to win Nanami's heart.

=== Apocalypse Saga ===
After being expelled from the Academy for injuring Touga, Saionji is given permission to return to Ohtori, and he immediately challenges Utena to another duel. During the fight, the Sword of Dios disappears, and Utena defeats Saionji with a sword Anthy draws from Utena's own body. Akio later appears before Touga and takes him to an unknown place he calls "the End of the World". Akio and Touga take each Student Council member to the End of the World in turn, and after going there, each one chooses a "bride" to take a sword from their hearts in order to fight Utena. The eventual victor of the duels will be determined by the strength of the bond between the Duelist and the Bride — and whether that bond can overcome Utena's bond with Anthy. Miki chooses Kozue as his bride; Ruka Tsuchiya, who returned recently to the academy, chooses Shiori; Juri brings Ruka; and Nanami brings Touga. However, even with the help of their brides, they all lose their duels against Utena.

Akio warns Touga that his next match with Utena will decide the true champion, but before the duel, Touga and Saionji discover more about Utena's origin, as they remember having found her in a coffin at her parents' funeral. Little by little, the mysteries surrounding Anthy, Akio and the duels start to unravel. Touga discovers his true feelings for Utena, and in order to protect her, he brings Saionji as his "bride" to fight her one last time, afraid of what could happen to her if she becomes the final victor. After losing the duel, he tries to warn her about Akio and Anthy's true intentions.

Despite Touga's warnings, Utena decides to go with Anthy once more to the duel stage in order to meet the prince from her past, only to discover that the arena is an illusion created by Akio to steal her heart's sword. Rather than submit to Akio's proffered fairytale ending at Anthy's expense, Utena decides to fight Akio and protect Anthy from him. Anthy, however, is complicit in her brother's schemes and literally stabs Utena in the back, allowing Akio to take her sword. He attempts to use it to open the gates that are said to seal the Power of Dios, but the sword breaks and Akio gives up. When Utena sees how much Anthy is suffering from her past, she opens the gate with her bare hands to find Anthy inside. Utena reaches out to Anthy, trying again to save her, and Anthy reaches for her hand. When they touch, the entire duel stage crumbles and Utena is attacked by the Swords of Hatred which had previously ensnared Anthy. After these events, it is revealed that Utena has disappeared from Ohtori Academy. Later, Akio decides to start the rose duels again, but Anthy informs him that she is leaving the Academy, the links that bound her to the Academy and her brother finally severed by Utena's intervention. The series ends with Anthy leaving the Academy in search of Utena.

No.	Title	Storyboarder(s)	Directed by	Written by	Animation supervisor(s)	Original release date
25	"Their Eternal Apocalypse"; Transliteration: "Futari no Eien Mokushiroku" (Japanese: ふたりの永遠黙示録)	Takuya Igarashi	Shingo Kaneko	Yōji Enokido	Masahiro Aizawa, Shinya Hasegawa, Hiroshi Nagahama	September 17, 1997
Akio insists that Anthy and Utena move into his residence. Meanwhile, he and the recuperated Touga step up their plans of manipulating the Duelists to fight Utena. Their first target is Saionji, who has become suspicious of the nature of the duels and mistrustful of the End of the World. Akio and Touga take him on a midnight ride in Akio's car, where Touga reminds Saionji of the night they found a girl in a coffin who wanted to believe in something eternal. Believing that Akio saved the girl by showing her eternity, Saionji enthusiastically duels Utena. The Sword of Dios disappears in the middle of fight, but Utena now has the inner strength to fight on her own — and Anthy has now become willing to help her discover it.
26	"Miki's Nest Box (The Sunlit Garden – Arranged)"; Transliteration: "Miki no Subako (Hikari Sasu Niwa – Arenji)" (Japanese: 幹の巣箱（光さす庭・アレンジ）)	Jun Matsumoto	Yukio Okazaki	Yōji Enokido	Akemi Hayashi	September 24, 1997
In spite of her outward delinquent personality, Kozue risks her life to save a nest of baby birds because she identifies with their loneliness and helplessness. Both she and Miki feel abandoned because their parents divorced when they were young, and their father is now remarrying. Akio, Touga and Kozue induce the insecure but moralistic Miki to rejoin the dueling game, becoming dirty in order to survive in a dirty world.
27	"Nanami's Egg"; Transliteration: "Nanami no Tamago" (Japanese: 七実の卵)	Hiroshi Nishikiori	Hayato Date	Ryōta Yamaguchi	Takahiro Tanaka, Yumi Nakayama	October 1, 1997
Nanami wakes up one day and finds an egg in her bed and assumes she must have laid it. She frets over what to do with it and finally decides to raise it as her own.
28	"Whispers in the Dark"; Transliteration: "Yami ni Sasayaku" (Japanese: 闇に囁く)	Tōru Takahashi	Tōru Takahashi	Ryōe Tsukimura	Kunihiro Abe	October 8, 1997
Ruka, the former fencing team captain and Juri's mentor, comes back to Ohtori after a long illness and resumes his position as fencing captain. As Juri comes to terms with his return, Shiori is quick to realize Ruka's connection to Juri and begins to date him. Ruka becomes involved with the duels and picks Shiori to be his Rose Bride, but he has his own agenda that does not involve her at all.
29	"Azure Paler Than the Sky"; Transliteration: "Sora yori Awaki Ruriiro no" (Japanese: 空より淡き瑠璃色の)	Mamoru Hosoda	Yoshiaki Iwasaki	Ryōe Tsukimura (Note: On episode 29 only, Ryōe Tsukimura is credited under the pseudonym "Chiaki Shirai" (白井千秋).)	Nobuyuki Takeuchi	October 15, 1997
After barely losing against Utena and dumping Shiori in front of the entire school, Ruka believes he has found the secret to winning the duels: the strength of the relationships between the Duelists and their respective Brides. He goes through a series of strategies to unleash the strength and selflessness Juri once had before her ill-fated love for Shiori distorted her self-perception and stopped her from growing.
30	"The Barefoot Girl"; Transliteration: "Hadashi no Shōjo" (Japanese: 裸足の少女)	Takuya Igarashi	Katsushi Sakurabi	Yōji Enokido	Hisashi Kagawa	October 22, 1997
Utena realizes what she has denied for a long time: she has fallen in love with Akio. As Akio's courtship of her becomes both overt and subtly sinister, Utena agonizes over loving an engaged adult and feels like she is betraying her prince — and Anthy.
31	"Her Tragedy"; Transliteration: "Kanojo no Higeki" (Japanese: 彼女の悲劇)	Hiroshi Nishikiori	Yukio Okazaki	Ryōta Yamaguchi	Akemi Hayashi	October 29, 1997
When Nanami learns that she and Touga aren't actually blood siblings, her world crumbles because she defines herself by her relationship to her brother. She runs away and spends the night in Akio's tower, but is traumatized when she sees Anthy and Akio together.
32	"The Romance of the Dancing Girls"; Transliteration: "Odoru Kanojo-tachi no Koi" (Japanese: 踊る彼女たちの恋)	Jun Matsumoto, Shingo Kaneko	Shingo Kaneko	Ryōta Yamaguchi	Masahiro Aizawa	November 5, 1997
Nanami is terrified of what she saw last night and broken by Touga's betrayal. She cannot help but connect Anthy and Akio's relationship to her own feelings for Touga. Touga presses Nanami on whether her true feelings for him are the same as Anthy's for Akio. To prove that she is not like Anthy, Nanami challenges Utena to a duel.
33	"The Prince Who Runs Through the Night"; Transliteration: "Yoru o Hashiru Ōji" (Japanese: 夜を走る王子)	Mamoru Hosoda	Tōru Takahashi	Yōji Enokido	Shinya Hasegawa, Hiroshi Nagahama	November 12, 1997
The Shadow Play Girls host a bizarre radio show that frames a recap of the most recent duels. Meanwhile, Akio brings Utena to an amusement park, and what happens between them forever changes her feelings about Akio, Anthy, her prince and herself.
34	"The Rose Crest"; Transliteration: "Bara no Kokuin" (Japanese: 薔薇の刻印)	Junichi Sato	Katsushi Sakurabi	Yōji Enokido	Yōko Kadokami, Shinya Hasegawa	November 19, 1997
The Shadow Play Girls host a play telling the generally accepted myth of the Rose Bride. After a conversation with Akio about the prince of her past, Utena has a dream depicting the truth about Anthy, Akio, Dios and herself.
35	"The Love That Blossomed in Wintertime"; Transliteration: "Fuyu no Koro Mebaeta Ai" (Japanese: 冬のころ芽ばえた愛)	Jun Matsumoto	Hayato Date	Ryōe Tsukimura	Masahiro Aizawa	November 26, 1997
Akio's courtship of Utena was successful while Touga's was not, yet only Touga knows just how dangerous Akio truly is. Even as Touga helps Akio woo Utena, the Student Council's most infamous playboy realizes that he has fallen in love with the one person he cannot have.
36	"And Thus Opens the Doorway of Night"; Transliteration: "Soshite Yoru no Tobira ga Hiraku" (Japanese: そして夜の扉が開く)	Hiroshi Nishikiori, Tōru Takahashi	Tōru Takahashi	Ryōe Tsukimura	Takahiro Tanaka	December 3, 1997
Touga invites Utena to the dueling arena at night, where he confesses his feelings to her. Convinced that his love is real and selfless, Touga fights together with Saionji to defeat Utena so they may save her from a final, deadly duel against Akio. Utena wins the Duel, but when she sees Anthy and Akio together, she faces one final test of nobility to decide whether she truly is a Prince.
37	"The One to Revolutionize the World"; Transliteration: "Sekai o Kakumei Suru Mono" (Japanese: 世界を革命する者)	Takuya Igarashi	Katsushi Sakurabi	Yōji Enokido	Nobuyuki Takeuchi	December 10, 1997
Shocked and confused after the previous night's revelations, Utena seems to put aside her desire to become a prince in favor of pursuing Akio. A talk with Miki, Juri and Nanami brings Utena's feelings for saving Anthy back to the surface. And when Anthy attempts suicide to escape the rapidly unraveling emotional landscape, Utena decides that her friendship with Anthy is more important than her ambivalence about her and resolves to protect her at their meeting with Utena's prince.
38	"End of the World"; Transliteration: "Sekai no Hate" (Japanese: 世界の果て)	Shingo Kaneko	Shingo Kaneko	Yōji Enokido	Akemi Hayashi	December 17, 1997
Akio reveals himself as Utena's prince, the "End of the World", and the orchestrator of the pain and suffering of the duels. He tries to woo Utena into giving him her soul's sword; when she rejects him rather than abandoning Anthy, he shows her the harsh reality behind the duels. Even when confronted with how she has compromised her own nobility, Utena chooses to fight, and she and Akio engage in the final and most dangerous duel. Utena seems to gain the upper hand, but Anthy sides with her brother and literally stabs Utena in the back, unable to accept her as a prince.
39	"And Someday, Together, We'll Shine"; Transliteration: "Itsuka Issho ni Kagayaite" (Japanese: いつか一緒に輝いて)	Mamoru Hosoda	Tōru Takahashi	Yōji Enokido	Shinya Hasegawa	December 24, 1997
While Anthy draws the Swords of Humanity's Hatred into her own body, Akio takes Utena's sword and tries to use it to open the Rose Gate, where the power to revolutionize the world is said to dwell. He breaks the sword against the gate and gives up. Though reeling from Anthy's betrayal and the shattering of her soul's sword, Utena summons all her strength to reach the Rose Gate and stop Anthy's suffering. There she opens the gate — now a coffin — to find Anthy inside. After a tearful exchange, Anthy reaches for Utena's hand, but as their hands touch, the coffin falls away and the swords begin ravaging both the arena and, apparently, Utena. Afterwards, the appearance of normalcy is restored, minus Utena. As Akio prepares to restart the duels, Anthy tells him that Utena hasn't vanished, but has merely left his world. Anthy leaves Akio and Ohtori Academy to find Utena.
