= Sharon Becker =

American actress

Sharon Becker is a New York-based make-up artist and a former voice actress. Arguably her most notable roles are Reiko Mikami in Ghost Sweeper Mikami and Anthy Himemiya in Revolutionary Girl Utena. She frequently worked with Central Park Media from 1997 to 2004.

== Filmography ==
=== Voice roles ===
- Adolescence of Utena – Anthy Himemiya
- Adventure Kid – Michiyo
- Alien from the Darkness – Annie
- Alien Nine – Additional Voices
- Arcade Gamer Fubuki – Alka
- Art of Fighting – King
- Big Wars – Lieutenant Darsa Keligan
- Cybernetics Guardian – Leyla
- Ghost Sweeper Mikami: The Movie – Reiko Mikami
- Guardian of Darkness – Motoko
- Legend of Himiko – Fujina
- Ping-Pong Club – Kyoko
- Revolutionary Girl Utena – Anthy Himemiya, Shadow Girl B
- Slayers Next – Mazenda, Miwan (Ep. 17), Queen of Femille (Ep. 17)
- Strange Love – Yoshida Chizuru
- Wrath of the Ninja – Kikyo

=== Film roles ===
- Cousin Howard – Irene
- Everything for a Reason – Wendy
- Indian Cowboy – Molly
