= Kunihiko Ikuhara =

Japanese director, writer, artist, and music producer

- 幾原 邦彦
- Born: December 21, 1964 (age 61); Osaka Prefecture, Japan
- Occupations: Director; music producer; novelist
- Years active: 1986–present
- Known for: Revolutionary Girl Utena; Penguindrum; Yurikuma Arashi; Sarazanmai
- Website: ikuni.net

Kunihiko Ikuhara (幾原 邦彦, Ikuhara Kunihiko; born December 21, 1964), also known by the nickname Ikuni, is a Japanese director, writer, artist, and music producer. He has created and collaborated on several notable anime and manga series, including Sailor Moon, Revolutionary Girl Utena, Penguindrum, Yurikuma Arashi, and Sarazanmai.

== Early life ==
Ikuhara was born on December 21, 1964, in Osaka Prefecture. He graduated from Kyoto University of Art and Design in 1985.

== Career ==
=== Toei Animation and Sailor Moon (1986–1996) ===
After graduating, Ikuhara began work at Toei Animation, where he served as assistant director to Junichi Sato on Maple Town Monogatari, Akuma-kun, Toushou!! Ramen-man and Mōretsu Atarō, and episode director on Kingyo Chuuihou!.

Ikuhara's most famous work with Toei was on the TV anime adaptation of Sailor Moon. He served as director of many episodes over the course of the series' run, and took over the position of series director from Junichi Sato during the second season, Sailor Moon R. Additionally, Ikuhara served as the director of the first Sailor Moon theatrical movie, called Sailor Moon R.

=== Revolutionary Girl Utena (1997–1999) ===
Displeased over the lack of creative control granted to him, Ikuhara left Toei after the fourth season of Sailor Moon in 1996 to form his own creative group, Be-Papas, consisting of himself, the shōjo manga artist Chiho Saito, animator Shinya Hasegawa, writer Yōji Enokido, and producer Yuichiro Oguro. Be-Papas collaborated to produce the anime and manga series Revolutionary Girl Utena (Shōjo Kakumei Utena).

Ikuhara had much more creative control over the anime, which he directed, than he did over the manga, which was written and illustrated by Chiho Saito. Notably, he also recruited composer J. A. Seazer, who provided the series' distinctive duel chorus tracks. Ikuhara stated that he had always admired Seazer, who had enjoyed popularity during Japan's 1960s student protest movement, and felt that Seazer's work, with its themes of revolution and changing the world, was perfectly suited to Utena.

The series was a success, winning the "Best Television Series Award" and the "Kobe Award" at Animation Kobe '97. Be-Papas collaborated again in 1999 to produce a Revolutionary Girl Utena movie, Adolescence Mokushiroku ("Adolescence Apocalypse", released in English as Revolutionary Girl Utena: The Movie), with an accompanying manga, again authored by Saito. Ikuhara also helped supervise the production of other Utena-related works, including a Sega Saturn video game and a stage musical. Be-Papas disbanded after the release of the movie.

Ikuhara supervised the production of the English dub of the Utena movie, checking the quality of the translation; he expressed strong distaste for the idea of his work being censored or changed to seem more "American", and made sure such changes were not apparent in the U.S. release.

=== Hiatus (2000–2010) ===
Ikuhara's post-Utena works include the manga World of the S&M (released in English as The World Exists for Me), on which he collaborated with Chiho Saito; the novel Schell Bullet, which he co-wrote with Mamoru Nagano; and the Schell Bullet-based concept album Thanaphs 68.

=== Return to directing (2011–present) ===
In 2011, Ikuhara returned as an anime series director with Penguindrum, which began airing in July 2011.

He is currently writing the manga Nokemono to Hanayome, illustrated by artist Asumiko Nakamura and published monthly in Japanese fashion magazine KERA.

In 2015, Ikuhara released Yurikuma Arashi, which consists of an anime series produced by Silver Link and a manga series illustrated by Akiko Morishima. The anime began airing on January 5, 2015.

In 2019, Ikuhara released Sarazanmai; it was produced by MAPPA and Lapin Track. The anime began airing on April 11, 2019.

As of October 10, 2020, Ikuhara has mentioned he is working on a new anime, but has not provided any further detail.

Ikuhara returned to direct Re:cycle of Penguindrum, a compilation film of Penguindrum, which released in two parts in 2022.

On March 31, 2022, Ikuhara announced that he was changing his name to "Bonsoir Ikuhara", later revealing it to be a pseudonym for Teiko Bon Bon, a music project with Bonjour Suzuki and Teiko.

== Personal life ==
=== Interests ===
In an interview, Ikuhara was asked if he had any American filmmaker influences, to which he answered Stanley Kubrick and David Lynch. When asked which of the two he would most like to work with, Ikuhara replied "I think I would like to work with David Lynch."

=== Interaction with fans ===
Ikuhara has attended several conventions and similar events, given interviews to fans and reporters, and, along with Chiho Saito, provided commentary tracks for the DVD releases of Utena. He often dresses in brightly colored clothes when socializing with fans. He has cosplayed as Sailor Mars on a few occasions.
