= Leah Applebaum =

American actress

Leah Applebaum is an American voice actress and Broadway actress. She is best known as the voice of Nanami Kiryu from Revolutionary Girl Utena and Erika, the Grass type Gym Leader from the internationally acclaimed Pokémon series.

== Career ==
Applebaum first got into voice acting while working for a Broadway sketch comedy called My Thoughts Here in New York when she got a call from a casting director who was casting for the Hugo Award winning Think Like a Dinosaur, a Sci-Fi Channel program. Applebaum got the lead role of Kamala Shastri, which led her to be cast as a reporter in The Signal Man, which was adapted from the original story by Charles Dickens. The attention Applebaum received from her work on the Sci-Fi Channel eventually got her the major role of Nanami Kiryu from Revolutionary Girl Utena and Erika from the highly popular Pokémon series. According to the Dogasu's Backpack interview, Applebaum revealed that her Nanami voice was inspired from Buffy, a main character from the Family Affair TV series.

== Voice roles ==
=== Anime ===
- Erika and Suzie in Pokémon
- Nanami Kiryu in Revolutionary Girl Utena
- Nanami the Cow in Utena: The Movie
- Giovanni's Mother in Night on the Galactic Railroad

=== Internet Radio ===
- Sci Fi Channel's Seeing Ear Theatre
  - Princess Loo-Koo and Prunn in The First (and Last) Musical on Mars
  - Computoid, Female Slave, and Rex in The Moon Moth
  - Net-Girl and Phone Voice in The Nostalgianauts
  - The Reporter in The Signal-Man
  - Matilda the Waitress in Tales from the Crypt Episode 6: "Fare Tonight, Followed by Increasing Clottiness"
  - Jane and Mistress Thornton in Time's Arrow, Time's Spiral
  - Kamala Shastri in Think Like a Dinosaur
