= Be-Papas =

Japanese artist group

Be-Papas (ビーパパス, Bīpapasu; alternately Bepapas and stylized as Be-PaPas) was a production group founded by anime director Kunihiko Ikuhara. Its membership consisted of Ikuhara, manga artist Chiho Saito, animator and character designer Shinya Hasegawa, scriptwriter Yōji Enokido, and planner Yūichirō Oguro. Ikuhara founded Be-Papas in 1996 to create Revolutionary Girl Utena, an original anime he conceived following his departure from Toei Animation, where he worked as a director on the anime series Sailor Moon. The group also created Revolutionary Girl Utena's 1999 film sequel Adolescence of Utena.

Be-Papas disbanded following the release of Adolescence of Utena, but remained in existence as a corporate entity until at least 2001 to publish several projects created by its former members, specifically Ikuhara and Mamoru Nagano's 1999 novel series Schell Bullet, Hasegawa and Enokido's 1999 serialized light novel Shounen Ou, and Ikuhara and Saito's 2001 manga series World of the S&M (released in English as The World Exists for Me).
