= Shinkichi Mitsumune =

Japanese composer

Shinkichi Mitsumune (光宗 信吉 Mitsumune Shinkichi) (born October 8, 1963) is a Japanese composer who writes music primarily for anime.

== Biography ==
Mitsumune is a native of Fukuoka City in Fukuoka Prefecture and a graduate of Rikkyo University with a degree in business. He started studying music at the age of 4. After graduating from college, he toured music festivals across Japan as a keyboardist for a Marine band, and later for musicians such as Yukie Nishimura. Starting in 1995, he lent his skills to composing anime and movie scores with a full orchestra.

== Notable Compositions ==
=== TV ===
- Nurse Angel Ririka SOS (1995)
- VS Knight Lamune & 40 Fire (1996)
- Revolutionary Girl Utena (1997)
- Cyber Team in Akihabara (1998)
- Yu-Gi-Oh! Duel Monsters (2000)
- A Little Snow Fairy Sugar (2001)
- Dragon Drive (2002)
- Green Green (TV series) (2003)
- Rozen Maiden (2004–2005)
- Negima! Magister Negi Magi (2005)
- Speed Grapher (2005)
- Hanbun no Tsuki ga Noboru Sora (2006)
- The Familiar of Zero (2006)
- Asatte no Houkou (2006)
- Sky Girls (2007)
- Zero no Tsukaima: Futatsuki no Kishi (2007)
- Zero no Tsukaima: Princess no Rondo (2008)
- Mahou Sensei Negima 2 (2009)
- Zero no Tsukaima F (2012)
- Rozen Maiden (2013)
- Amagi Brilliant Park (2014)
- Yu-Gi-Oh! VRAINS (2017)

=== OVA ===
- FLCL (2000) (with the pillows)
- Love Hina Again (2002)
- Sky Girls (2006)

=== Theatrical ===
- Love and Pop (live action) (1998)
- Revolutionary Girl Utena (1999)
- Cyber Team in Akihabara (1999)

=== Contributions ===
- For Megumi Hayashibara: Nostalgic Lover, Cherish Christmas, Asu ni Nare
- For Maria Yamamoto: Snow Flower
- For Power Puff Souls (a group made up of the voice actress who star in the Japanese version of The Powerpuff Girls): Cream Puff Shuffle (Japanese theme song)
