= Shinya Hasegawa =

Japanese animator and art director

Shinya Hasegawa (長谷川眞也, Hasegawa Shin'ya; born July 28, 1968) is a Japanese animator and art director. As a member of the production group Be-Papas, he co-created the 1997 television anime series Revolutionary Girl Utena and its 1999 film sequel Adolescence of Utena. He also worked as an animation director on the 1995 television anime series Neon Genesis Evangelion.
