= J. A. Seazer =

Japanese composer (born 1948)

- 寺原 孝明 / J・A・シーザー
- Born: Takaaki Terahara; 6 October 1948 (age 78); Miyazaki Prefecture, Japan
- Occupations: Composer; Theatre director; Lyricist
- Years active: 1971-current
- Website: https://banyuinryoku.wixsite.com/index

Takaaki Terahara (寺原 孝明, Terahara Takaaki), known professionally as Julius Arnest "J.A." Seazer (born 6 October 1948), is a Japanese film and theater music composer. Seazer enjoyed popularity among students in Japan during the 1960s, and worked closely with director Shuji Terayama and his theater Tenjo Sajiki until Terayama's death (besides incidental music, he wrote a few full-fledged rock operas for Tenjo Sajiki, including Shintokumaru). He is a member of the theatrical company Experimental Laboratory of Theatre ◎ Universal Gravitation (演劇実験室◎万有引力, Engeki-Jikkenshitsu Ban'yū Inryoku), better known as just Ban'yū Inryoku. He gained more mainstream attention for his songs composed for the anime Revolutionary Girl Utena, and has also composed the score to the animated film adaptation of Suehiro Maruo's manga Mr. Arashi's Amazing Freak Show (also known as Midori or Shojo-tsubaki).
