= Yōji Enokido =

Japanese screenwriter and novelist

Yōji Enokido (榎戸 洋司, Enokido Yōji; born September 27, 1963) is a Japanese screenwriter and novelist born in Shiga. He has written scripts for Sailor Moon, Neon Genesis Evangelion, Revolutionary Girl Utena, FLCL, RahXephon, Melody of Oblivion, Ouran High School Host Club, Nodame Cantabile, Redline, Star Driver, Captain Earth, Bungo Stray Dogs, The Dragon Dentist and Mobile Suit Gundam GQuuuuuuX. He has also written a three volume novelization of FLCL, which was released in the United States by Tokyopop from 2008 to 2009. Prior to becoming a scriptwriter, he was an employee at Nippon Telenet Corporation which focused on MSX personal computer communication services.

== Screenwriting credits ==
=== Anime ===
Series head writer denoted in bold

- Sailor Moon S (1994-1995)
- **Sailor Moon SuperS** (1995-1996)
- Neon Genesis Evangelion (1995)
- **Revolutionary Girl Utena** (1997)
- RahXephon (2002)
- UFO Ultramaiden Valkyrie (2002)
- **The Melody of Oblivion** (2004)
- **Ouran High School Host Club** (2006)
- **Nodame Cantabile: Paris** (2008)
- **Star Driver** (2010-2011)
- **Captain Earth** (2014-2015)
- **Bungo Stray Dogs** (2016-)
- **The Dragon Dentist** (2017)
- **Mobile Suit Gundam GQuuuuuuX** (2025)

=== OVA/ONA ===
Series head writer denoted in bold

- **FLCL** (2000-2001)
- **Diebuster** (2004-2006)
- Bungo Stray Dogs: Hitori Ayumu (2016)
- Star Wars: Visions (2025)

=== Films ===
- Sailor Moon SuperS: The Movie (1995)
- Adolescence of Utena (1999)
- RahXephon: Pluralitas Concentio (2003)
- Diebuster: The Movie (2006)
- Redline (2009)
- Star Driver: The Movie (2015)
- Bungo Stray Dogs: Dead Apple (2018)
- Mobile Suit Gundam GQuuuuuuX Beginning (2025)
