= Revolutionary Girl Utena =

Japanese anime series

少女革命ウテナ (Shōjo Kakumei Utena)
- Genre: Magical girl; Surrealist; Romance
- Created by: Be-Papas
- Manga
- Written by: Chiho Saito (author); Be-Papas (original story)
- Illustrated by: Chiho Saito
- Published by: Shogakukan
- English publisher: NA: Viz Media
- Imprint: Flower Comics
- Magazine: Ciao, Bessatsu Shōjo Comic Special, Flowers
- English magazine: Animerica Extra
- Original run: Initial run May 2, 1996 – March 20, 1998; Adolescence of Utena; May 5, 1999 – September 5, 1999; After the Revolution; July 28, 2017 – March 28, 2018
- Volumes: 7
- Anime television series
- Directed by: Kunihiko Ikuhara
- Produced by: Noriko Kobayashi (TV Tokyo); Shinichi Ikeda (Yomiko Advertising)
- Written by: Yōji Enokido
- Music by: Shinkichi Mitsumune (Note: Mitsumune was also responsible for arranging the original choral music J.A. Seazer wrote for the series.)
- Studio: J.C.Staff
- Licensed by: AUS: Hanabee; NA: Nozomi Entertainment; UK: Anime Limited
- Original network: TXN (TV Tokyo)
- English network: US: Anime Network, Funimation Channel, Neon Alley
- Original run: April 2, 1997 – December 24, 1997
- Episodes: 39
- Film
- Adolescence of Utena (1999)
- icon

Revolutionary Girl Utena (Note: Japanese: 少女革命ウテナ, Hepburn: Shōjo Kakumei Utena; also stylized as Utena la Fillette Révolutionnaire (transl. 'Utena the Revolutionary Girl')) is a Japanese anime television series created by Be-Papas, a production group formed by director Kunihiko Ikuhara and composed of himself, Chiho Saito, Shinya Hasegawa, Yōji Enokido and Yūichirō Oguro. The series was produced by J.C.Staff and originally aired on TV Tokyo from April to December 1997. Revolutionary Girl Utena follows Utena Tenjou, a teenage girl who is drawn into a sword dueling tournament to win the hand of Anthy Himemiya, a mysterious girl known as the "Rose Bride" who possesses the "power to revolutionize the world".

Ikuhara was a director of the anime adaptation of Sailor Moon at Toei Animation in the 1990s; after growing frustrated by the lack of creative control in directing an adapted work, he departed the company in 1996 to create an original series. While he initially conceived Utena as a mainstream shōjo (girls' anime and manga) series aimed at capitalizing on the commercial success of Sailor Moon, the direction of the series shifted dramatically during production towards an avant-garde and surrealist tone. The series has been described as a deconstruction and subversion of fairy tales and the magical girl genre of shōjo manga, making heavy use of allegory and symbolism to comment on themes of gender, sexuality, and coming-of-age. Its visual and narrative style is characterized by a sense of theatrical presentation and staging, drawing inspiration from the all-female Japanese theater troupe the Takarazuka Revue, as well as the experimental theater of Shūji Terayama, whose frequent collaborator J. A. Seazer created the songs featured in the series.

Revolutionary Girl Utena has been the subject of worldwide critical acclaim, and has received many accolades. It has been praised for its treatment of LGBT themes and subject material, and has influenced subsequent animated works. A manga adaptation of Utena written and illustrated by Saito was developed simultaneously with the anime series, and was serialized in the manga magazine Ciao beginning in 1996. In 1999, Be-Papas produced the film Adolescence of Utena as a follow-up to the television series. The series has had several iterations of physical release, including a remaster overseen by Ikuhara in 2008. In North America, Utena was initially distributed by Central Park Media starting in 1998; the license for the series has been held by Crunchyroll since its 2023 acquisition of Right Stuf and its subsidiary Nozomi Entertainment, which acquired the license for Utena in 2010.

== Plot ==
Revolutionary Girl Utena is divided into three story arcs: the "Student Council Saga" (episodes 1–12), the "Black Rose Saga" (episodes 13–24), and the "Apocalypse Saga" (episodes 25–39).

As a child, Utena Tenjou was given a rose-engraved signet ring by a traveling prince, who promised her that they would one day meet again. Inspired by the encounter, Utena vowed to one day "become a prince" herself. Years later, a teenaged Utena is a student at Ohtori Academy, an exclusive boarding school. She finds herself drawn into a sword dueling tournament with the school's Student Council, whose members wear signet rings identical to her own. The duelists compete to win the hand of Anthy Himemiya, a mysterious student known as the "Rose Bride" who is said to possess the "power to revolutionize the world". Utena emerges victorious in her first duel; obliged to defend her position as the Rose Bride's fiancée, she remains in the tournament to protect Anthy from those who seek the power of the Rose Bride for themselves.

After dueling and achieving victory over the council, Utena is confronted by Souji Mikage, a student prodigy who uses his powers of persuasion and knowledge of psychology to manipulate others into becoming duelists. Mikage aims to kill Anthy to install Mamiya Chida, a terminally ill boy, as the Rose Bride. Utena defeats each of Mikage's duelists, and ultimately Mikage himself. Following his defeat, Mikage vanishes from Ohtori Academy, and the denizens of the school seemingly forget that he ever existed. It transpires that Akio Ohtori, the school's chairman and Anthy's brother, was using Mikage as part of a plot to obtain the "power of eternity". Mamiya was in truth a disguised Anthy, who assisted Akio in his manipulation of Mikage.

Akio appears before each of the Student Council members, and takes them to a place he refers to as "the end of the world". Following their encounters with Akio, each of the Council members face Utena in rematches. Utena defeats the Council members once more, and is called to the dueling arena to meet the prince from her past. She discovers that the prince was Akio, and that he intends to use her and Anthy to gain the power of eternity for himself. Utena duels Akio to free Anthy from his influence; Anthy, complicit in her brother's scheme, intervenes and stabs Utena through the back. Akio attempts and fails to open the sealed gate that holds the power; a gravely injured Utena pries the gate open, where she discovers Anthy inside. Utena reaches out to her, and they briefly join hands as the dueling arena crumbles around them.

Utena vanishes from Ohtori Academy, and all save for Akio and Anthy begin to forget her existence. Akio comments that Utena failed to bring about a revolution, and that he intends to begin a new attempt to attain the power of eternity; Anthy responds that Utena has merely left Ohtori Academy, and that she intends to do the same. Anthy solemnly vows to find Utena, and departs from Akio and the school.

== Characters ==
The primary cast of Revolutionary Girl Utena, illustrated by Shinya Hasegawa based on designs by Chiho Saito

Most of the characters in Utena are school-aged adolescents whose character arcs focus on their psychological and moral growth into adulthood, in the tradition of a bildungsroman or coming-of-age story. Series writer Yōji Enokido identified characters who reckon with the transition from youth to maturity by attempting to regress and "take back what they can't ever return" as a major theme for the series, and director Kunihiko Ikuhara stated that he developed the cast of Utena using the self-described rule to "never give a character only one personality".

The character designs for the series were created by Chiho Saito based on direction from Ikuhara, (Note: Ikuhara rejected Saito's earliest designs because he felt the costumes were too reminiscent of the science fiction and fantasy genres, prompting Saito to adopt the military-style uniforms that ultimately appear in the series.) which were then adapted for use in the television anime series by Shinya Hasegawa. Hasegawa stated that he was attracted to Utena as a project because of Saito's art style, distinguished by characters with slender bodies, long limbs, pointed chins, and large eyes, as well as by a stylized focus on the dramatized body movement of characters. He commented that Saito's style deviated from the "anime-like" art that was popular in manga of the era, and thus presented a compelling challenge to adapt into anime.

The title character of the series is Utena Tenjou, a middle school-aged girl who seeks to emulate the noble disposition of the prince she encountered in her youth. She is courageous, forthright, and kind, if somewhat naïve and impulsive. Utena is distinguished by her tomboyish demeanor and manner of dress, particularly her insistence on wearing a boys' school uniform. Ikuhara has characterized Utena as embodying the traits of both a romance heroine and a romanticist hero, describing her in this regard as someone "who has at the same time both the romance of a girl and the romance of a boy." The magazine Animage noted Tomoko Kawakami's role of Utena as playing against type for the actress, having previously voiced "boisterous gyaru-type characters". She was cast partially because she did not read the character description before auditioning and thus spoke naturally, contrasting other actresses who put on a masculine voice. According to Kawakami, she desired to communicate Utena's "friendly, good nature and how admirable she is to everyone, while not overdoing the boyishness" in her performance.

After Utena is drawn into the dueling tournament with the school's Student Council – president Touga Kiryuu, his sister Nanami Kiryuu, vice president Kyouichi Saionji, fencing team captain Juri Arisugawa, and boy genius Miki Kaoru – she is introduced to Anthy Himemiya, the mysterious "Rose Bride" at the center of the duels. As the Rose Bride, Anthy is submissive to the personality and disposition of whoever is the current champion of the tournament, and possesses seemingly no free will or independent identity of her own. Though at first glance Anthy resembles a stereotypical damsel in distress defined by her passivity and demureness, as the series progresses, she is revealed to occupy a central role in controlling the duels and the school itself with her brother Akio Ohtori. In early development, Ikuhara conceived of Utena and Anthy as a single character: a girl "who wants to be a prince, but at the same time also wanted to remain a princess". He ultimately split the character in two, Anthy becoming "another Utena" who by contrast wishes to "remain a princess". Ikuhara stated that he consciously crafted the plot and visuals of Utena to create a strong impression on the viewer that the series would climax with Utena saving Anthy, but the lingering question of "but what does she save Anthy from?" becomes, per Ikuhara, the "central issue" of the series.

== Development ==
=== Context ===
"There's this sort of element of robot wrestling that started with Mazinger Z, and from that trend sprang forth Gundam. Gundam is an anime made for those who grew up watching robot anime. You could say that I created Utena because I thought that some viewers had been trained by watching Sailor Moon and the like."

— Kunihiko Ikuhara

While working as an animator at Toei Animation, series co-creator Kunihiko Ikuhara joined the anime television adaptation of Naoko Takeuchi's 1991 shōjo manga series Sailor Moon as an episode director and later, beginning with the second season, Sailor Moon R, he assumed the role of series director. Frustrated by the lack of creative control in adapting an existing work, Ikuhara departed from Toei in 1996 after the production of Sailor Moon SuperS to create an original series. To this end, Ikuhara assembled Be-Papas, a five-member team of creative professionals from the anime and manga industry which also included manga artist Chiho Saito, animator and character designer Shinya Hasegawa, writer Yōji Enokido, and planner Yūichirō Oguro.

Several team members had previously worked together on other projects: Hasegawa and Enokido had previously worked with Ikuhara on Sailor Moon, where Enokido wrote many of the episodes featuring Sailor Uranus and Sailor Neptune in addition to serving as head writer for SuperS; Hasegawa and Enokido also contributed to the anime series Neon Genesis Evangelion. Saito, an established manga artist, had never worked in anime before joining Be-Papas; Ikuhara decided to base the visuals of the series on her artwork and recruited her to the team after seeing an illustration from her manga series Magnolia Waltz on the cover of a magazine.

=== Planning ===
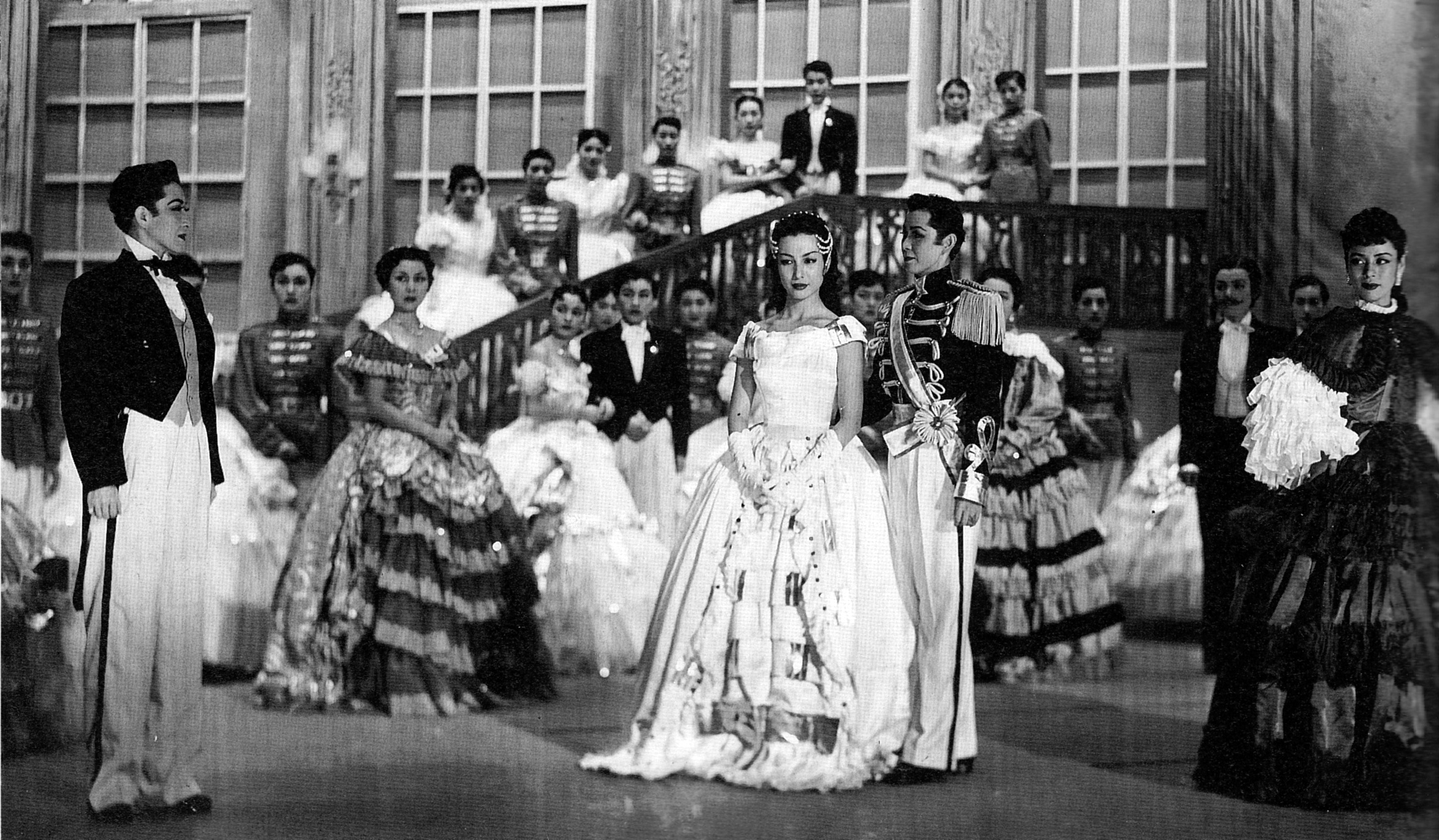
The Takarazuka Revue (pictured 1954), an all-female Japanese theater troupe, was a major influence on Revolutionary Girl Utena.

Ikuhara originally envisioned Utena as a mainstream shōjo series aimed at capitalizing on the commercial success of Sailor Moon. Saito characterized the earliest discussions on Utena as focused on creating a series "that people will like and [will] be profitable". The earliest concepts for Utena deviated significantly from what became the final series: an initial pitch to project financiers was titled Revolutionary Girl Utena Kiss, and focused on a group of female warriors called the "Neo Elegansar" who battled "the end of the world". (Note: This plot was based on a concept for a scrapped Sailor Moon SuperS film Ikuhara had been slated to direct, which would have involved Sailor Uranus, Sailor Neptune, and the concept of "the end of the world".) Per Oguro, a basic series concept of "a romantic action show starring a pretty girl who wears boys' clothes" that had a "Takarazuka style" was eventually settled on. A school setting was also determined in this early concept phase, though other concepts such as the duels and the "Rose Bride" would not be formulated until later in development.

Although Ikuhara originated the concept for Utena, the series as a whole was developed collectively by Be-Papas. The group entered a six-month planning period after Saito joined Be-Papas, which focused on fleshing out the story and setting, as well as determining how Saito's visual style could best be imported into anime. Saito also began to contemporaneously write and illustrate a manga adaptation of Utena while contributing to the development of the anime series.

Utena was inspired by several sources – Animage described the series as "influenced by [Ikuhara's] idiosyncrasies" – including the Takarazuka Revue, the artwork of Jun'ichi Nakahara, Hermann Hesse's novel Demian, and the experimental theater of Shūji Terayama. Saito cited the manga series Kaze to Ki no Uta and the 1973 film adaptation of The Three Musketeers as among the influences that informed her contributions to Utena. Ikuhara has stated that although he "wouldn't be able to avoid it being said" that Utena was influenced by Princess Knight and The Rose of Versailles – two shōjo manga series known for their cross-dressing, sword-fighting heroines – throughout the development of Utena, he was possessed of an "immense fear" that the series would be seen merely as a parody of those works. Saito stated that she was hired to join the otherwise all-male Be-Papas in part because they were concerned that without a female perspective they would create a parody of shōjo manga, which was not their intention.

=== Production ===
"The project went in an entirely different direction without my knowledge. Maybe the revolution had already completed itself inside Mr. Ikuhara's head, and maybe that's why it ended up like this? [...] I don't think of it as I was tricked, but I watched in amazement how [Ikuhara] went ahead with it without ever turning back."

— Chiho Saito

Shortly after Saito's manga adaptation of Utena began serialization in 1996, negotiations for the broadcast of the Utena television anime were settled, and production began. Be-Papas served as the primary production staff for Utena, with animation production being handled at J.C.Staff in Musashino, Tokyo.

Ikuhara's ambitions for Utena shifted dramatically after the series commenced production. Believing that the series required "a unique individuality" if it was to find an audience, he abandoned his previous goal of a mass-market hit in favor of more non-commercial aspirations. To this end, he began to incorporate a variety of avant-garde elements into the series, such as theatrical-inspired layouts, a recurring shadow play segment that allegorically comments on the events of each episode, and the experimental choral music of composer J. A. Seazer.

Enokido characterized the production of Utena as marked by "an agreeable sense of tension" between the members of Be-Papas. As the direction of the series shifted away from its original commercial focus, production became what Oguro described as a "tug-of-war" between Saito and Ikuhara, as Saito advocated for the original romantic concept for the series over Ikuhara's new, more esoteric vision. Ikuhara and Saito particularly quarreled over whether the series should depict the relationship between Utena and Anthy as a romance, and at one point during production did not speak to each other for a period of three months. Saito was initially opposed, not out of an ideological opposition to depicting a same-sex romance, but because she believed the mainstream shōjo audience the series was ostensibly attempting to court would respond poorly to anything other than a male-female romance. Ikuhara would conceal the extent to which he intended to present Utena and Anthy's relationship as a romance from Saito throughout production; Saito ultimately expressed support for how the series presented the relationship between the characters.

Key individuals involved in the production of Utena beyond the membership of Be-Papas included Shingo Kaneko and Tōru Takahashi, who served under Ikuhara as assistant directors. Kaneko described incorporating a "cinematic sensibility" for Utena that actively incorporated twists and tricks; Takahashi was initially recruited to the project as an animator by Hasegawa, as they were attending the same vocational school, but was made a director after he expressed his aspiration to do so to Ikuhara. Hiroshi Nagahama was the conceptual designer for the series, designing the dueling area and the Ohtori Academy school buildings. Nagahama compared the design process for Utena to creating a stage set, with a focus only on what is seen by the audience. Background art was created by Shichirō Kobayashi, based on initial designs by Nagahama, and Mamoru Hosoda and Takuya Igarashi were among the storyboard artists for the series.

=== Style ===
The series makes use of various stylistic flourishes, including the marking of character introductions and significant plot moments with a decorative frame.

Utena is characterized by a high degree of stylization that integrates surrealist and expressionist elements to communicate mood and convey allegorical meaning. Enokido described a sense of "theatrical staging and presentation" as one of the core elements of Utena, while Ikuhara has stated that he wanted from the early stages of development for the series to be "operatic". The series makes use of multiple stylistic flourishes, including the marking of character introductions and other significant plot moments with a decorative black frame anchored by spinning roses, which staff on the series referred to as an "attention mark". Certain recurring segments such as Utena's entry to the dueling arena make use of long segments of animation and music that are identical (or nearly identical) from episode to episode, as analogous to the recurring transformation scenes from Sailor Moon. The duels are themselves heavily stylized, in a manner that scholar and critic Susan J. Napier notes is reminiscent of the ritualized performance style of Noh theater. (Note: Ikuhara described directing the duel segments as "such a pain", as there is "a limit to the visual variations" that can be expressed in a standard sword duel. According to Ikuhara, Enokido enthusiastically advocated early in development for the characters to duel with guns rather than swords, which Ikuhara vetoed.)

Narratively, the series has been described by critics as a deconstruction of fairy tale narratives and a subversion of the magical girl genre of shōjo manga. Napier notes how the series uses the narrative and visual aesthetics of these categories, such as princes, castles, romance, beautiful boys, and beautiful girls, to "critique the illusions they offer". Ikuhara has described directing certain early episodes of the series such as "On the Night of the Ball" specifically to be "uncomfortably stereotypical[ly] shōjo" to "strongly impress upon the audience that this was a 'shōjo manga anime'" and establish the tropes that the series intended to subvert. In discussing his aspirations for Utena in regards to shōjo manga, Ikuhara stated that he wished to create the series as a soukatsu shite (総括して; 'summarization' or 'sum up'), an "anime that rounded up all the shōjo manga into one" and which expressed all of the broader themes of the genre in a single work.

== Releases ==
Revolutionary Girl Utena was originally broadcast weekly on TV Tokyo from April 2 to December 24, 1997. The series consists of two seasons, respectively composed of episodes 1 to 24 and episodes 25 to 39, and was originally produced on 16 mm film. The series has had several iterations of physical releases in Japan, including a VHS and LaserDisc release beginning in 1997, and a DVD release beginning in 1999. A remastering of the series overseen by Ikuhara was published as two boxed DVD sets released in 2008 and 2009, and as two boxed Blu-Ray sets released in 2013. A limited edition boxed set collecting the entire series on Blu-Ray was released in 2017 in commemoration of the series' 20th anniversary.

In North America, licensing for Utena was overseen by Enoki Films USA; the company produced a proof of concept for potential distributors that localized Utena for Western audiences, giving the characters English names and re-titling the series Ursula's Kiss. North American distribution rights were first acquired by Central Park Media, which released both English dubbed and subtitled editions of the series that preserved the original series title and character names. Central Park released the first thirteen episodes of the series on VHS beginning in 1998; due to licensing issues, the company did not release the series in full until its DVD release beginning in 2002. Central Park's licenses were liquidated after the company declared bankruptcy in 2009, and the North American license to Utena was acquired by Right Stuf under its Nozomi Entertainment label in 2010. The company released the series on DVD in 2011, the remastered edition of the series on Blu-Ray in 2017, and its own 20th anniversary series boxed set in 2018. In June 2011, Utena's voice actress Tomoko Kawakami died of ovarian cancer. Right Stuf dedicated the Apocalypse Saga's DVD release to her. Right Stuf and its subsidiaries were acquired by Crunchyroll in 2023.

Outside of North America, Utena is licensed by Anime Limited in the United Kingdom and Hanabee in Australia. International broadcast and streaming rights for Utena have alternately been acquired by a variety of channels and streaming services, including FUNimation Channel in 2007, Anime Network in 2009, Neon Alley in 2013, Funimation in 2020, and Crunchyroll in 2021.

== Related media ==
=== Manga ===
Contemporaneous with the development of the anime series, Chiho Saito wrote and illustrated a manga adaptation of Revolutionary Girl Utena, which was serialized by Shogakukan in the shōjo manga anthology Ciao beginning in 1996. Saito also published a one-shot in Ciao titled The Rose Seal which depicts Utena before to her transfer to Ohtori Academy, as well as a manga adaptation of the film Adolescence of Utena in Bessatsu Shōjo Comic Special. An English-language translation of the manga has been published by Viz Media, which also serialized the Utena manga in its manga anthology Animerica Extra.

Unlike most of the manga series that are adapted either into or from an anime, the plots of the Utena manga and anime deviate significantly from each other. These differences in plot, such as the manga's increased focus on the relationship between Utena and Touga, were in part a function of the fact that Saito began to write and illustrate the manga before the anime series went into production. She attempted to incorporate as much material as possible from the scripts Enokido had completed, but was frequently required to use her own judgement in rendering aspects of the story that the anime would ultimately depict in an entirely different manner. Animerica described the production of the manga adaptation as "one that got its inspiration largely through [Saito's] own confusion about what exactly she was supposed to show, and Ikuhara's own vague answers to her questions." Saito changed editors five times during the manga's year-and-a-half long serialization as a result of the confusion around its production.

A sequel to the Utena manga series, Revolutionary Girl Utena: After the Revolution, was announced in 2017 to commemorate the 20th anniversary of the series. Written and illustrated by Saito, the three-chapter series depicts the lives of the primary cast following their departure from Ohtori Academy, and was serialized in the Josei manga anthology Flowers from July 2017 to March 2018.

=== Soundtrack and music ===
"J.A. Seazer was a charismatic idol of the student activists in the late 1960s. I found about J.A. Seazer when the student movement in Japan was over. But his music still carried all the energy from the times of the student movement. And that was the scream wanting to change the world."

— Kunihiko Ikuhara

Shinkichi Mitsumune scored Utena and also arranged the insert songs written by fellow composer J. A. Seazer. Each episode typically features two of Seazer's songs that play as incidental music: "Zettai Unmei Mokushiroku" (transl. "Absolute Destiny Apocalypse"), which appears as a recurring theme as Utena enters the dueling arena, and a song unique to each episode that plays during the duel itself. The duel songs function similarly to a Greek chorus, commenting on the motivations of the duelists through allegorical lyrics that feature references to religious, scientific, and arcane subjects. The songs were performed by the Tokyo Philharmonic Chorus; Ikuhara and Mitsumune accompanied them on some of these songs.

Seazer originally produced the songs featured in the series as part of his experimental theater company Engeki Jikken-Shitsu: Banyu Inryoku (lit. 'Experimental Laboratory of Theatre: Universal Gravitation'). Ikuhara was significantly influenced by Seazer and Tenjō Sajiki, an experimental theater company established by dramatist Shūji Terayama where Seazer was co-director and composer; following Terayama's death, Seazer founded Banyu Inryoku as its successor. Ikuhara sought to work with Seazer, describing the experience as "fulfill[ing] the dream I had from my teenage years", but noted that the financers for Utena were strongly opposed to using Seazer's music, owing to its highly avant-garde style. Seazer agreed to participate in Utena in part because he was a fan of Sailor Moon.

Toshiro Yabuki composed the series' opening theme "Rondo-Revolution", while singer Masami Okui wrote and performed it. Ikuhara told Okui to "think of this as a song that will play during the story's last scene" when writing "Rondo-Revolution", though at the time he had not yet decided what the last scene would be beyond a vague concept of two people parting from each other. Ikuhara sent several key phrases to Okui use as lyrics, including "sunlit garden", "revolutionize", "lose everything", "strip down to nothing at all", and "change the world". The series uses two ending themes: episodes 1 to 24 use "Truth", performed by Luca Yumi with lyrics by Shoko Fujibayashi; episodes 25 to 38 use "Virtual Star Embryology", performed by Maki Kamiya with lyrics by Seazer. The final episode uses a scat version of "Rondo-Revolution" performed by Okui as its ending theme.

=== Film ===
Shortly after the conclusion of the Utena anime television series, Be-Papas announced plans to release a feature film follow-up to the series. The film, titled Adolescence of Utena, was released in theaters in Japan on August 14, 1999. The film occupies an ambiguous place in the broader Utena canon, and has been alternately interpreted as a stand-alone adaptation that exists in its own continuity, and as a sequel that is contiguous with the events of the anime series.

=== Stage musicals ===
Several musical adaptations of Utena have been produced, beginning with Comedie Musicale Utena: La Fillette Révolutionnaire in December 1997. The musical was directed by Yūji Mitsuya, staged at the Hakuhinkan Theater in Tokyo, and featured an all-female Takarazuka-inspired cast. This was followed by Revolutionary Girl Utena Hell Rebirth Apocalypse: Advent of the Nirvanic Beauty in 1999 by director Ei Takatori, and Revolutionary Girl Utena: Choros Imaginary Living Body in 2000.

A series of 2.5D musical adaptations were announced in 2017 as part of a commemoration project to mark the 20th anniversary of the Revolutionary Girl Utena anime. The first musical, Revolutionary Girl Utena: Bud of the White Rose, was staged in 2018 and adapts the Student Council Saga from the original anime. A sequel adapting the Black Rose Saga, Revolutionary Girl Utena: Blooming Rose of Deepest Black, was staged in 2019, with the cast and director of Bud of the White Rose reprising their roles.

Ikuhara has discussed the early stage adaptations of Utena in ambivalent terms, stating that "it looks extremely cheesy" when the theatrical visuals of Utena are rendered as literal theater. He served as a supervisor on the 2018 and 2019 musicals, noting that he had previously refused multiple offers to adapt Utena into a 2.5D musical, but relented after a producer convinced him that it would be a good way to introduce the series to a younger generation.

=== Other media ===
Two light novels written by Ichirō Ōkouchi with illustrations by Chiho Saito, titled Shōjo Kakumei Utena: Aoi no Futaki (少女革命ウテナ – 蒼の双樹; lit. 'Revolutionary Girl Utena: Twin Saplings') and Shōjo Kakumei Utena: Midori no Omoi (少女革命ウテナ – 翠の思い; lit. 'Revolutionary Girl Utena: Verdant Hopes'), were published by Shogakukan in 1997 and 1998, respectively. Okouchi called these books "younger brothers" of the television series, where events from the show were slightly reinterpreted.

A video game, Shōjo Kakumei Utena: Itsuka Kakumeisareru Monogatari (少女革命ウテナ いつか革命される物語; lit. 'Revolutionary Girl Utena: The Story That Will Someday Be Revolutionized'), was developed and published by Sega for the Sega Saturn in 1998. A visual novel with dating sim elements, the game tells an original story about the player character (voiced by Kaoru Fujino), a transfer student at Ohtori Academy. The voice cast of the anime series reprise their roles for the game.

== Themes and analysis ==
=== Gender ===
Utena's desire to "become a prince" does not refer to a literal desire to become royalty or change her gender, but rather to her desire to exhibit qualities of courage, compassion, and strength that represent an ideal of princeliness. "Being a prince" thus constitutes a body of ideas connoting a sense of heroic agency, rather than a reflection of Utena's gender identity or presentation. The series contrasts the notion of the "prince" to that of the "princess", represented by the passive, helpless, and objectified Anthy.

Although the simple juxtaposition of prince and princess archetypes could suggest that Utena is a straightforward "feminist fairy tale", Napier argues that the series "is not simply a work of female empowerment". Napier and other critics argue that Utena uses the prince/princess dichotomy to examine how gender roles restrict the development of both women and men, how the victims of this system come to enforce these restrictions on other victims, and ultimately suggests that being a "prince" is as limiting as being a "princess", as both originate from the same restrictive system. This expression reaches its apex at the climax of the series, when Utena loses her final duel against Akio; though Utena ostensibly fails in her princely attempt to "save" Anthy, her actions cause Anthy to "question the rules governing her own performance as princess", and provokes her departure from Ohtori to a world where "the categories of prince and princess have been deconstructed and do not matter".

In considering depictions of gender in Utena, critic Mari Kotani cites the character of Utena as an example of a sentō bishōjo (lit. 'battling beauty'), a character archetype originated by psychologist and critic Tamaki Saitō. Kotani argues that Utena is a bishōjo as her character design "satisfies the lustful eyes of the male voyeur who reads manga for eroticized images of girls", but that any efforts to objectify Utena are complicated by her crossdressing and role as an active protagonist. She argues that the success of Utena lies in its blending of elements of shōnen (through its focus on combat) and shōjo (through its focus on romance) vis-à-vis the character of Utena, and how this blending "deftly exposes the structure of sexuality implicit in manga for girls".

=== Coming-of-age ===
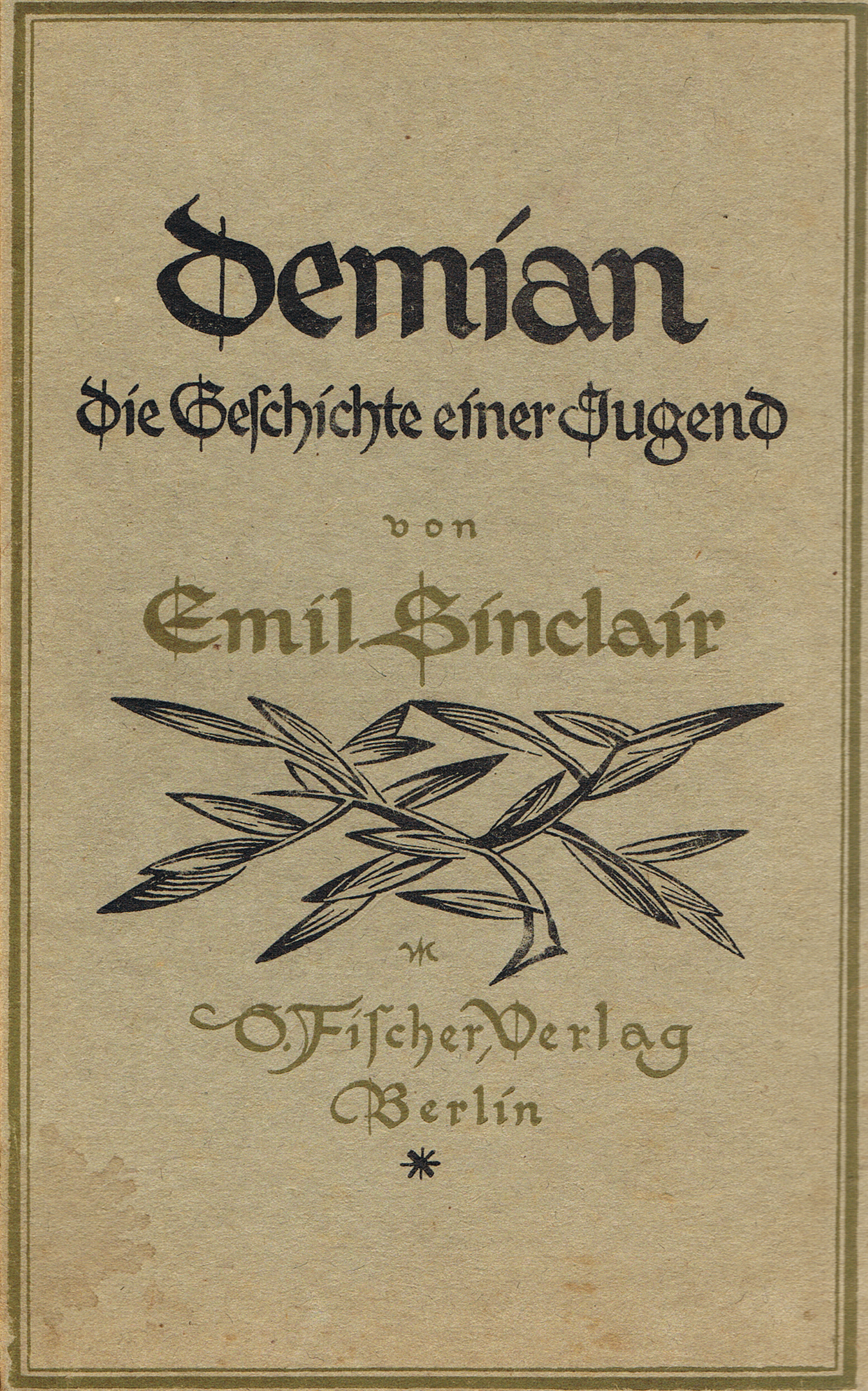
The Student Council's mantra is a modified passage from Hermann Hesse's 1919 bildungsroman novel Demian.

Adolescence and its attendant struggles of personal growth and development are a common theme in Ikuhara's works, with a frequent focus on teenaged characters who seek personal change yet are bound to their pasts in ways they are not consciously aware of. This focus on the transition from adolescence implicates Utena in the bildungsroman genre; the Student Council's repeated mantra in which they entreat each other to "crack the world's shell" is a modified passage from Hermann Hesse's 1919 novel Demian, a major work of the bildungsroman genre. Typically, characters in Ikuhara's works seek a MacGuffin-like device that purports to solve their struggles by accelerating the process of change; in Utena, this is represented as the "end of the world". (Note: This device also appears in Ikuhara's Penguindrum as the titular Penguin Drum, and in Sarazanmai as the Dishes of Hope.) The device is ultimately revealed to be either unreal or lacking the power that is ascribed to it, but serves to symbolically represent how the characters are constrained by broader systems of power and coercion.

The actual meaning of the "end of the world" is never strictly defined by the series itself, though Ikuhara has discussed the concept in terms of adolescent psychology, connoting the sense of despair one feels upon reaching adulthood and becoming aware of social realities that disillusion an idealized child-like conception of the world. The "end of the world" is contrasted against the "power to revolutionize the world" and the "power of eternity", also defined only in vague terms within the series, though Ikuhara has described "revolution" in the context of the series as connoting "the power to imagine the future", and "eternity" as "the power to create an enjoyable future". Enokido has noted how each of the characters in Utena seek their own version of "eternity", which he describes as representing the "desire to vicariously re-experience times past", but which ultimately symbolizes the danger of humans being "ruled by sentimentality".

=== Sexuality ===
Utena depicts multiple gay and lesbian couplings, all of which are treated as legitimate and normal within the world of the series itself. Ikuhara has stated that he wished for the series to have "a sense of diversity" in this regard, and that the series' normalized depiction of same-sex couples serves to reinforce the core series message of freedom of the self. The series' depiction of sexuality has been considered in relation to its subversion of fairy tale and magical girl tropes, as the trials Utena faces often occur in the context of efforts to pressure her into the "heroic heterosexuality and monogamy" typical of those genres.

Napier argues that although Utena's depiction of same-sex couplings can be interpreted as indicating that "homoerotic relationships can be part of liberation", the relationship between Utena and Anthy can also be interpreted as a metaphor for "the need for integration of two sides of the self". Utena's chivalrous desire to "save" Anthy gives her a blinkered perspective that is only resolved through an archetypically feminine understanding of and empathy for Anthy's situation; Anthy's regressive domesticity is ameliorated after she gains "a dose of masculine assertiveness". Napier notes that while Akio's relationship with Anthy is clearly toxic, the series depicts Utena's overt effort to "save" Anthy as itself cloying and overwhelming, and that it is only when Anthy makes the choice herself to leave Ohtori Academy that she begins on the path to develop "a more integrated personality".

== Reception and influence ==
"At the simplest, Utena describes how two women find their own identities. But Utena is no bourgeois bildungsroman of finding one's place in the world. Nor is Utena a linear narrative of events apocalyptic and otherwise. Instead, Utena delves into the nature of the past and its karmic hold on people, into the nature of corruption and sexuality, and into revolution."

— Timothy Perper & Martha Cornog, Mechademia (2006)

Revolutionary Girl Utena has been the subject of worldwide praise, and has received many accolades. In 1997, the series won the Animation Kobe award in the "Best Television" category. In 2017, Japanese broadcaster NHK conducted a national poll to determine the one hundred greatest anime in commemoration of the hundredth anniversary of the medium, in which Utena placed 30th. Utena was listed as one of the ten "best anime ever" by Anime Insider and ranked fourth on Paste's list of the best anime of all time. Anime News Network's ranking of the 100 greatest anime films of all time placed Adolescence of Utena in eighth; in his review, writer Mike Toole called the television series "the most important anime of the 1990s".

The series has received particular praise for its treatment of LGBT themes and subject matter; reflecting on the series in this regard in 2020, Ikuhara stated that there "are a lot of anime that deal superficially with female-female or male-male relationships, but I think the sense of freedom and of diversity that Utena had is one of the reasons that it has such a big fan base even now." Critics and creators have cited Utena's influence on subsequent animated works, including Revue Starlight, Princess Tutu, Puella Magi Madoka Magica, Mobile Suit Gundam: The Witch from Mercury, Steven Universe, and She-Ra and the Princesses of Power. The series has also been credited with prompting a revival in popularity for the music of J. A. Seazer.

Anime and manga scholar Susan J. Napier notes that Japanese critics frequently compared Utena to the 1996 anime series Neon Genesis Evangelion. Both focus on themes of coming-of-age and apocalypse themes; Adolescence of Utena is sometimes referred to by fans as The End of Utena, referencing the 1997 film The End of Evangelion. Although Napier considers that Evangelion depicts a "pathological apocalypse" where the stakes are the entire world, she characterizes Utena as a "baroque apocalypse, one of adolescent emotion where everything is larger than life, identity is at its most problematic, and life itself is lived in the extremes." Critic Mari Kotani notes the common comparison of Utena to Evangelion, but states that she regards Utena as more directly comparable to early shōjo manga, specifically citing the works of Jun'ichi Nakahara and Macoto Takahashi published in the magazine Soleil.
