= List of Crayon Shin-chan characters =

This is a characters list of Japanese manga and anime series Crayon Shin-chan created by Yoshito Usui.

== Main characters ==
Shinnosuke Nohara (野原 しんのすけ, Nohara Shinnosuke) (野原 信之介)
Voiced by: Akiko Yajima (1992–2018), Yumiko Kobayashi (2018–present), Kath Soucie (Vitello), Diane Michelle (Phuuz), Laura Bailey (Funimation), Gil Jopling (Amazon Spin-off)
A five-year-old boy in kindergarten and a member of Kasukabe Defence Force. He is Hiroshi and Misae's son and Himawari's brother and is nicknamed "Shin-chan". His favorite things are chocolate biscuits and the characters "Action Kamen" and "Kantum Robot", while he dislikes green bell peppers. Like his mother, he is gluttonous, stubborn, forgetful and prone to imagining things, and, like his father, likes to read adult magazines and flirt with young girls, especially if they are dressed in revealing clothing. Unlike his parents, he is shameless, outspoken and often insensitive towards others and infatuated with humor related to the buttocks, which makes them uncomfortable. Due to his age, he cannot read, write, or speak properly, so he often misreads and mispronounces words. He often indulges in age-inappropriate jokes, mostly scatological jokes and pulling down his pants to reveal his buttocks and/or genitals and dancing in the process. He also loves to indulge in drag. Despite his crude nature and destructive behavior, he genuinely loves his family and shows instances of selfless kindness and maturity beyond his years, such as saving a frog from a truck despite it ruining his last set of clean clothes and giving Masao his change despite knowing that Misae will scold him later. He is known as Shin-chan Nohara in the Vitello, Phuuz, and Indian dubs, and Shin Nohara in the Funimation dub. Julian Ryall of the South China Morning Post referred to him as the "Japanese Bart Simpson".

Misae Nohara

Misae Nohara 野原みさえ (野原 美冴)
- Voiced by: Miki Narahashi; Kath Soucie (Vitello); Julie Maddalena (Phuuz); Cynthia Cranz (Funimation); Alisha Todd (Amazon Spin-off)

In-universe information
- Full name: Misae Koyama
- Spouse: Hiroshi Nohara
- Relatives: List of relatives: Hiroshi Nohara (husband); Shinnosuke Nohara (son); Himawari Nohara (Daughter); Yoshiji Koyama (father); Hisae Koyama (mother); Masae Koyama (older sister); Musae Koyama (younger sister); Ginnosuke Nohara (father-in-law); Tsuru Nohara (mother-in-law); Aunt Fusae (maternal aunt)

Shinnosuke's mother, who is from Aso in the Kumamoto prefecture of Kyushu. While she is caring and nurturing, her positive aspects are overshadowed by her flaws. She often does not follow the rules she sets for her family and is frugal, but willing to splurge on Himawari and herself; however, most of these purchases end up broken or misused. She also secretly hoards money for personal use, which often ends up being spent on running the household in times of financial strain. Since she has issues with maintaining her appearance, she is jealous of Hiroshi interacting with others. Due to her inability to use computers or speak English, Misae is unable to seek office work, so she occasionally works part-time at the local shopping mall, but is unable to keep the job for long due to her short temper. While living at Falling Apartments, Misae is shown to have worked part-time from home. She is known as Mitsy Nohara in the Vitello, Phuuz and Indian dubs and Mitzi Nohara in the Funimation dub and the One Peace English manga.

Hiroshi Nohara

Hiroshi Nohara 野原ひろし (野原 廣志)
- Voiced by: Keiji Fujiwara (1992–2016); Toshiyuki Morikawa (2016–present); Eric Loomis (Vitello); Peter Doyle (Phuuz); Chuck Huber (Funimation); Roly Gutierrez (Amazon Spin-off)

In-universe information
- Relatives: List of relatives: Misae Nohara (Wife); Shinosuke Nohara (Son); Himawari Nohara (Daughter); Semashi Nohara (Brother); Ginnosuke Nohara (Father); Tsuru Nohara (Mother); Yoshiji Koyama (Father-in-law); Hisae Koyama(Mother-in-law)

Shinnosuke's father, who is from a village near Omagari in the Akita prefecture of northern Honshu and is a graduate of Waseda University. He is his family's sole source of income, working as a low-level manager at the marketing firm "Futaba Corporation" in Kasumigaseki, but allows Misae to handle the family's spending. He is a stereotypical Japanese salaryman, working eight-hour days and frequently working overtime, and giving all of his take-home pay to his wife each month. While his relationship with his family is positive, he and Misae often argue over issues such as Misae's frugal nature and the allowance she gives him to spend on his personal needs. She dislikes his passion for golf, seeing it as a waste of time, although he sees it as a way to bond with his boss. Although he wants to save his allowance for things he wants, usually new golf clubs, Misae often takes it to spend on shopping sprees. He is known as Harry Nohara in the Vitello, Phuuz, and Indian dubs, and Hiro Nohara in the Funimation dub.

Himawari Nohara

Himawari Nohara 野原ひまわり (野原 向日葵)
- Voiced by: Satomi Kōrogi; Russi Taylor (Vitello); Colleen Clinkenbeard (Funimation); Gil Jopling (Amazon Spin-off)

In-universe information
- Relatives: List of relatives: Hiroshi Nohara (Father); Misae Nohara (Mother); Shinnosuke Nohara (brother); Masae Koyama (maternal aunt); Musae Koyama (maternal aunt); Semashi Nohara (paternal uncle); Ginnosuke Nohara (paternal grandfather); Tsuru Nohara (paternal grandmother); Yoshiji Koyama (maternal grandfather); Hisae Koyama (maternal grandmother); Aunt Fusae (maternal great-aunt)

Shinnosuke's sister and the youngest child of the Nohara family, whose name, which means "sunflower" in Japanese, was chosen by the show's viewers rather than the creator. She is an energetic and precocious, and despite her young age, has matured and become more intelligent over the course of the series. Her parents hoped that she would be different from her brother, but to their dismay, she shares his mischievous nature. She looks up to her brother a lot and is very close to him despite their sibling rivalry. She is known as Daisy Nohara in the Vitello and Phuuz dubs and Hima Nohara in the Funimation dub.

Shiro
Voiced by: Mari Mashiba (1992–present), Kazuki Ogawa (2010s–present) (Japanese); Michael Sorich (Phuuz), Chris Cason (Funimation) (English)
Shiro (シロ, Shiro) is a white Maltese puppy who Shinnosuke found and adopted after finding him abandoned in a cardboard box by the side of the road. He is intelligent, often displaying logic and intellect that surpasses that of his owners. Although he is a beloved member of the family, he is often the victim of neglect, as he is infrequently fed and has developed a talent for foraging. As well, they often do not realize his help or what he is trying to show them. He is very protective of Himawari. He is known as Lucky in the Vitello and Phuuz dubs and Whitey in the LUK International dub and Funimation dub; in the latter, he has an added British voice over and it is mentioned that he had a brother named Blackey, who was also found and taken in by Shinnosuke's family, but died after being hit by a car.

Toru Kazama

Toru Kazama 風間 トオル
- Voiced by: Mari Mashiba (1992–present); Grey DeLisle (Vitello); Hope Levy (Phuuz); Brina Palencia (Funimation)

In-universe information
- Nicknames: Kazama; Kazama-kun; Toru-chan
- Relatives: Mr. Kazama (father); Mineko Kazama (mother)

Shinnosuke's friend, who is close to him despite their frequent fights and secretly recognizes him as his best friend, despite denying it publicly. He attends cram school for Mathematics & English Conversation and participates in many extra-curricular activities in the aim of being admitted to a reputed primary school, so he pretends to be knowledgeable in subjects even if he is not. He is skilled at playing association football and baseball and likes animation and comic books, though he tries to hide this from his friends in order to appear more mature. Since his father remains abroad for most of the year, he has a strong attachment to his mother, which he is often ridiculed for. He often he tries to hang out with upper class girls his age from his cram school to be a part of the "elite". Although Kazama is sometimes suggested to look down upon Shinnosuke due to the economic status of his family and his weird mannerisms, he is secretly envious of him for having a younger sister and a pet dog. He is known as Cosmo in the Vitello and Phuuz dubs and Georgie Herbert Walker Prescott III in the Funimation dub, where he and his family are portrayed as being Republicans.

Nene Sakurada (桜田 ネネ, Sakurada Nene)
Voiced by: Tamao Hayashi (1992–present) (Japanese); Anndi McAfee (Vitello), Michelle Ruff (Phuuz), Carrie Savage (Funimation) (English)
A five-year-old girl who is Shinnosuke's classmate and only female member of the Kasukabe Defence Force. Like her mother, she uses a stuffed bunny as a punching bag to relieve her anger, yet likes rabbits. She considers Ai-chan her rival, bickering with her for influence among the boys. She loves to play 'real omamagoto', or 'real house', which is a re-enactment of Japanese dramas that she usually forces her friends to play over other games. Despite this and her headstrong nature, she is kind and loves her friends and will not hesitate to stand up for them. She is known as Nini in the Vitello and Phuuz dubs and Penny Milfer in the Funimation dub. In the LUK Internacional dub, she has a British accent.

Masao Sato (佐藤 マサオ, Satō Masao)
Voiced by: Teiyū Ichiryūsai (1992–present) (Japanese); Russi Taylor (Vitello), Barbara Goodson (Phuuz), Colleen Clinkenbeard (Funimation) (English)
A five-year-old boy who is shy and cowardly and has low self-esteem, which he is often teased for; despite this, Nene encourages him to stand up for himself. He is creative and enjoys writing and illustrating comics, as well as collecting objects and maintaining cleanliness. He is in love with Ai and jealous of Shinnosuke because of her love for him, but despite this they are still best friends. He is known as Max in the Vitello and Phuuz dubs and Maso Sato in the Funimation dub and in one chapter of the One Peace manga. The Funimation website says that Maso is like "Linus without his blanket."

Bo-chan (ボーちゃん, Bō-chan)
Voiced by: Chie Satō (1992–present) (Japanese); Eric Loomis (Vitello), Richard Cansino (Phuuz), Chris Cason (Funimation) (English)
A five-year-old boy and Nisu's brother, who is one of Shinnosuke's best friends. He is smart despite his slow and stoic nature, which often surprises his friends. He enjoys collecting stones and investigating urban legends, such as UFOs. He is known as Boo in the Funimation dub. The Funimation website says that Boo is "sort of like Dim from A Clockwork Orange, or Eeyore from Winnie the Pooh,- without the depression." In the Hindi dub he was called Suzuki in the earlier dubs, but uses real names in the later dubs.

== Supporting characters ==
Midori Ishizaka (née Yoshinaga) (石坂（よしなが） みどり, Ishizaka (Yoshinaga) Midori)
Voiced by: Yumi Takada, Haruhi Terada (Japanese); Anndi McAfee (Vitello), Cindy Robinson (Phuuz), Caitlin Glass (Funimation) (English)
Shinnosuke's class teacher and wife of Junichi Ishizaka, who has a rivalry with Ume Matsuzaka and often argues with her, but takes care of and protects her in certain critical situations. Shinnosuke and his friends use her residence as the secret base of the Kasukabe Defence Force, which she has forbidden them from doing after her marriage. She is known as Miss Dori Snell in the Vitello and Phuuz dubs and Miss Anderson in the Funimation dub.

Ume Matsuzaka / Matsuzaka Ma'am (まつざか 梅, Matsuzaka Ume)
Voiced by: Michie Tomizawa (Japanese); Grey DeLisle (Vitello), Clarine Harp (Funimation) (English)
A 24-year-old woman who is the Rose Class's teacher and Ishizaka's rival, who comes from a peasant family in rural Japan. She likes to live in style, but in reality she struggles to save money for luxuries and lives in a cheap apartment. Although she has stated that she dislikes teaching at Futaba Kindergarten and plans to move to a better school, she does not do so, even when offered the opportunity to work at another kindergarten with higher pay. Since she is single, she often tries to date other people, but her dates are often ruined or they are already married. She eventually meets Tokurou, but their relationship does not work out. She is known as Miss Uma in the Vitello and Phuuz dubs and Rachel Katz in the Funimation dub, in which she is portrayed as having not dated anyone for a long time, and is bitter towards Anderson's relationship with Doyle as a result.

Masumi Ageo (上尾 ますみ, Ageo Masumi)
Voiced by: Kotono Mitsuishi (Japanese); Jamie Marchi (Funimation) (English)
A 22-year-old woman who is the teacher of the Sakura class. She was originally a substitute teacher for Matsuzaka after she was hospitalized with a broken leg, but was later hired permanently following the creation of the Sakura class and was made its teacher. She has a fear of heights and is easily nervous, especially when teaching a large group of children. She is in love with Kuroiso, who is Ai's personal bodyguard, and dates him, but the motivation behind it changes between the manga and the anime from admiration to romance. Miss Ageo always wears glasses. She is ferocious when her glasses are taken off. She is known as Miss Agnes in the Vitello and Phuuz dubs and Miss Polly in the Funimation dub.

Bunta Takakura (高倉 文太, Takakura Bunta)
Voiced by: Rokurō Naya (1992–2014), Junpei Morita (2015–) (Japanese); Pat Fraley (Vitello), Jason Liebrecht (Funimation) (English)
The principal of Futaba Kindergarten, who is often misunderstood by others because of his yakuza-like appearance, but is really kind and optimistic. He has high blood pressure due to stress, which he states is because of the teachers and Shinnosuke and his friends. His name is derived from the actors Bunta Sugawara and Ken Takakura, who were famous for their yakuza roles in movies. He is known as Principal Enzo in the Vitello and Phuuz dubs and Principal Bernoulli Ench in the Funimation dub, where he is portrayed as a half-Peruvian, half-gypsy man who was once a magician, but was exiled from his home country after killing several audience members during one of his magic acts.

Ginnosuke Nohara (野原 銀の介, Nohara Ginnosuke)
Voiced by: Ginzō Matsuo, Chō (Ep. 429 and on) (Japanese); Pat Fraley (Vitello), Sonny Strait (Funimation) (English)
Hiroshi's father and Shinnosuke and Himawari's paternal grandfather, who, like his son and grandson, likes to flirt with women. When he visits his family, he always stays for much longer than Misae would like, causing friction between them. He is more technologically advanced than his son and daughter-in-law, as he is shown using mobile phones long before Hiroshi and Misae bought their own. In the Funimation dub, he is called "Gin" and is said to have roamed the countryside on a motorcycle when he was younger. He is known as Gary in the Vitello and Phuuz dubs.

Tsuru Nohara (野原 つる, Nohara Tsuru)
Voiced by: Chie Kitagawa (1992–2010), Kikumi Umeda (2013–present) (Japanese); Russi Taylor (Vitello) (English)
Hiroshi's mother and Shinnosuke and Himawari's paternal grandmother, who is more reasonable than her husband but sometimes participates in his antics.
Yoshiji Koyama (小山 よし治, Koyama Yoshiji)
Voiced by: Kenichi Sakaguchi, Tomoaki Ikeda (Japanese); John Swasey (Funimation) (English)
Misae's father and Shinnosuke and Himawari's maternal grandfather, who, as a retired teacher, has much higher standards of public decorum than Ginnosuke, which results in them frequently arguing. Although he is stubborn like his daughters and grandson and conservative, he is caring and dotes on his grandchildren. Hiroshi is afraid of Yoshiji due to his strict demeanor, and he initially disapproves of him marrying Misae, but later accepts him as his son-in-law after seeing that his dream is to raise children. He is known as Waldo in the Vitello and Phuuz dubs, Yoshi Koyama in the Funimation dub, and Yoshio Koyama in the Indian dub.

Hisae Koyama (小山 ひさえ, Koyama Hisae)
Voiced by: Noriko Uemura (Japanese); Wendy Powell (Funimation) (English)
Misae's mother and Shinnosuke and Himawari's maternal grandmother. She often argues with Yoshiji and, like him, looks down on Ginnosuke's behavior, but gets along well with his wife Tsuru. In the Funimation dub, she is implied to have threatened to kill herself in the past, but often doubts that she will go through with it.

Musae Koyama (小山 むさえ, Koyama Musae)
Voiced by: Michiko Neya (Japanese); Carli Mosier (Funimation) (English)
Misae's younger sister and Shinnosuke and Himawari's aunt. She is an amateur photographer and dreams of becoming a professional one. Compared to her sisters, she is more childlike, and as such gets along well with the local kids. After arguing with her father, who disapproved of her career because he thought she was too lazy to achieve anything, she secretly travels to Kasukabe and begins living with Misae. After Yoshiji discovers this during a surprise visit to Kasukabe, he declares that if Musae does not achieve anything in the next three months, he will make other arrangements for her. As such, Musae, with help from Shinnosuke, begins working as an assistant to a well-established photographer, moving out of the Noharas' house and into a rented room in the 'Falling Apartments'. However, after working for a few months, she has a falling out with her employer and returns to living with Misae, and her sisters and parents unsuccessfully attempt to convince her to get married because of her refusal to become a housewife. She later begins working at the Kasukabe book store. She is known as Musae Mausi in the Indian dub and Bitzi Koyama in the Funimation dub, where she is stated to be a brown-brown addict.

Ai Suotome (酢乙女 あい, Suotome Ai) "Ai-Chan"
Voiced by: Ayako Kawasumi (Japanese); Monica Rial (Funimation) (English)
A five-year-old girl and Kawaguchi's sister, who once lived in the US city of New York until they moved to Japan and enrolled her in Futaba Kindergarten after throwing a dart at a map of Japan to determine where she would go next. She is in love with Shinnosuke and uses his weaknesses to get him to notice her, but he is oblivious to her efforts. Later on in the series, she and her family permanently move to Hokkaido, but occasionally return to visit. She is known as Sally in the Phuuz dub.

Yasuo Kawamura (河村 やすお, Kawamura Yasuo; Cheetah Kawamura)
Voiced by: Tomoko Ōtsuka (Japanese); Russi Taylor (Vitello), Trina Nishimura (Funimation) (English)
A boy nicknamed "Cheetah" because he often wears a leopard shirt and has formed a clique with his classmates Hitoshi and Terunobu. He dislikes Shinnosuke and Kazama and often argues with them. Although he is confident in his athletic abilities and is the leader of the Rose Class, which almost always loses to the Sunflower Class, he can be kind, such as when he agrees to help Shinnosuke make a gift for Masao after she is hospitalized, and when he is upset after the Kasukabe Defence Force announces that they are "disbanding".

Hitoshi (ひとし, Hitoshi)
Voiced by: Fūko Shinomiya, Chisa Yokoyama, Nao Nagasawa
A kindergarten student of Rose class who, along with Terunobu, likes to bully Masao. In the Funimation dub, he is unnamed and is portrayed as a second-grader rather than a kindergartner.

Terunobu (てるのぶ, Terunobu)
Voiced by: Ayako Shiraishi, Yuri Shiratori, Fujiko Takimoto
A kindergarten student of Rose class who, along with Hitoshi, likes to bully Masao. Like Hitoshi, in the Funimation dub he is unnamed and portrayed as a second-grader.

Moeko Sakurada (桜田 もえ子, Sakurada Moeko)
Voiced by: Shoko Saito (Ep. 01-97), Junko Hagimori (Ep. 98-) (Japanese); Grey DeLisle (Vitello), Gwendolyn Lau (Ep. 4-48), Lydia Mackay (Ep. 53-71) (Funimation) (English)
Nene's mother, who, despite being annoyed by Shinnosuke's antics, is friends with Misae and visits her in the hospital after she is hospitalized. She expresses her anger by using a stuffed toy rabbit, which Nene also does. She is known as Ruby in the Vitello and Phuuz dubs and Patty Milfer in the Funimation dub. In the LUK Internacional dub, she has a British accent. A recurring joke is that she seeks to leave her abusive husband and work in a brothel to support herself financially. It is also stated that she had another child after Penny named Caitlin, who drowned in a lake.

Mineko Kazama (風間 みね子, Kazama Mineko)
Voiced by: Sakiko Tamagawa (Japanese); Melinda Wood Allen (Funimation) (English)
Kazama's mother, who has made him do many extracurricular activities, including football, cricket, and English tuitions. She is friends with Misae, who is secretly jealous of her wealth and having a good-mannered son like Kazama. It is also implied that she suffers from premature greying of hair.
She is known as Barbara Prescott in the Funimation dub.

Ekasuky Sato (マサオくんのママ, Sato Ekasuky)
Voiced by: Tomoko Ōtsuka
Masao's mother, who greatly resembles him.

Kuroiso (黒磯, Kuroiso)
Voiced by: Fumihiko Tachiki (Japanese); Christopher Sabat (Funimation) (English)
Ai-chan's bodyguard and driver, who is loyal to her and has dated Miss Ageo. He is known as Mr. K in the Funimation dub.

Nanako Oohara (大原 ななこ, Ōhara Nanako)
Voiced by: Sayuri, Shizuka Itō (Japanese); Stephanie Young (Funimation) (English)
A college girl who dreams of becoming a kindergarten teacher and on whom Shinnosuke has a crush. She is the only one who is not bothered by his behavior and the only one he tries to behave for. She is known as Miss Bono in the Vitello and Phuuz dubs.

Shijuurou Oohara (大原 四十郎, Ōhara Shijūrō)
Voiced by: Mugihito
Nanako's father. He is a famous author of many popular books. He is overprotective of his daughter and worries too much about her. He is often seen disrupting any important matter at hand whenever he has the most extremely subtle (false) hint that Nanako may be in trouble. He disapproves of Shin-chan's affections for his daughter, though they both band together in keeping an eye on her.
In the Funimation dub, he is known as Will Cumton, and is re-imagined as a vampire who exclusively appears in the episode "True Twillight Diaries". Similar to most stereotypical vampires, he is afraid of garlic, silver, and sunlight. He is also said to be able to transform into a half-bat half-human form, which he can use to fly away. He went on a snowboarding trip with Nanako (who was not aware of his real identity) and intended to use her body to replace her soul with that of his deceased lover, Cookie. He was also responsible for Rex's "mysterious" death, who used to be Nanako's ex-boyfriend and a famous snow-boarder. His attempts to seduce Nanako were all foiled by Shin. He is voiced with a Cajun accent, and is stated to be from Louisiana, as well as being rather wealthy.

Shinobu Kandadori (神田鳥 忍, Kandadori Shinobu)
Voiced by: Mizuki Ōtsuka
Nanako's friend from college, who dreams of becoming a professional wrestler. Her name is based on the wrestler Shinobu Kandori. In the manga, she falls in love with the Noharas' neighbor Omata, but later breaks up with him in order to focus on her wrestling career. She is known as Griselda in the Funimation dub, where she is stated to be Dutch.

Kensuke Suzuki (鈴木 けんすけ, Suzuki Kensuke)
Voiced by: Ken Narita, Ryuichi Higashi
Shijuurou's editor, who works of Futaba Publishing, which is known as Mitsuba Publishing in the anime. He is based on the editor-in-chief of Manga Town, the magazine the Crayon Shin-chan manga is serialized in. In the Funimation dub, he is known as Renfield and is depicted as Vampire Will's servant.

Ryuko Okegawa (桶川 竜子, Okegawa Ryūko)
Voiced by: Kazue Ikura (Japanese); Brittney Karbowski (Funimation) (English)
The 17-year-old leader of the clique Saitama Red Scorpions. Despite her violent and brash behavior, she is kind and gentle and has a secret hobby of cosplaying as Sailor Moon characters, which hides from her teammates along with the fact that she does not know how to use a cell phone. She also has a crush on Shinnoshuke's kendo teacher.

Ogin Uonome (魚の目 お銀, Uonome Ogin)
Voiced by: Midori Nakazawa, Chizuko Hoshino (Japanese); Amanda Doksocil (Funimation) (English)
A member of the Saitama Red Scorpions, known as "Fish-eyed Ogin" because she wears a mask with an "X" on it that resembles the eye of a dead fish. Despite her violent and stoic demeanor, she can be kind as she tries to help her sick mother.

Mary (マリー, Marī)
Voiced by: Akiko Muta (Japanese); Trina Nishimura (Funimation) (English)
A member of the Saitama Red Scorpions who tries to help her friends even though she is clumsy and not good at fighting.

Kawaguchi (川口)
Voiced by: Daiki Nakamura
Hiroshi's coworker, who looks up to him and often goes out to lunch with him. He has a crush on his junior colleague Yumi Kusaka. He is known as Morty Giffel in the Vitello and Phuuz dubs.

Hiroshi's boss (ひろしの上司, Hiroshi no jōshi)
Hiroshi's boss and manager.

Keiko Honda (本田 ケイコ, Honda Keiko)
Voiced by: Minami Takayama
A 29-year-old woman who is Misae's friend from middle school and Satoshi's wife. Keiko is also known as Aunt Okei (オケイ おばさん, Okei Obasan)

Satoshi Honda (本田 悟史, Honda Satoshi)
Voiced by: Shiina Nagano, Takuma Suzuki
A 21-year-old man and Keiko's husband, who loves anime and owns many Action Mask movies and action figures.He is known as Jim in the Vitello and Phuuz dubs.

Hitoshi Honda (本田 ひとし, Honda Hitoshi)
Voiced by: Yuri Amano, Wasabi Mizuta (stand-in)
Keiko and Satoshi's son.

Fumie Mogamigawa (最上川ふみえ, Morigamigawa Fumie)
Keiko's niece, who sometimes babysits Shinnosuke and Hitoshi.

Reiko Kitamoto (北本れい子, Kitamoto Reiko)
Voiced by: Reiko Suzuki (Japanese); Laurie Steele (Funimation) (English)
The Nohara family's neighbor, who likes to gossip and talk with Misae. The Nohara family temporarily lives in her house after their own house was destroyed by an explosion due to a gas leak. After moving into "Falling Apartments", they entrust Shiro to her because the landlady did not allow them to have pets. She is known as Goobers in the Vitello and Phuuz dubs and Yuka in the Funimation dub.

Robert McGuire (ロベルト・マクガイヤー, Roberuto Makugaiyā)
Voiced by: Yukitoshi Hori (Japanese); Robert McCollum (Funimation) (English)
Kitamoto's nephew, who lives in the United States but sometimes stays at her house. Since he is unfamiliar with Japanese culture, Shinnosuke tries to teach him about it, but is often wrong.In the Funimation dub, he is an albino French man who was sent to Yuka through couch surfing to keep her company. Kenta believes him to be "the albino titan, Beezledrop", and sent him to Afghanistan to open a portal. He later returns to Kasukabe, but was apparently indoctrinated by terrorists during his time in Afghanistan. In the LUK Internacional dub, he is French instead of American.

Yoshirin Hatogaya (鳩ヶ谷 ヨシりん, Hatogaya Yoshirin)
Voiced by: Daisuke Sakaguchi (Japanese); Eric Vale (Funimation) (English)
The Nohara family's neighbor, who, along with his family, move next door to them after meeting them during a trip to Hawaii. They were originally one-shot characters, but their reintroduction as reoccurring characters resulted in a redesign in their appearance. They are mentioned as having few friends, and often come to visit the Noharas, only to argue over trivial matters. Yocchi is close to his wife to the point that he is unwilling to leave her to go to work or when she has to be hospitalized due to illness. In the Funimation dub, he and his wife are in constant debt due to their constant spending and need to have new things. He is known as Luis in the Vitello and Phuuz dubs.

Micchi Hatogaya (鳩ヶ谷 ミッチー, Hatogaya Micchī)
Voiced by: Fumie Kusachi, Makiko Ōmoto (Japanese); Luci Christian (Funimation) (English)
Yoshirin's wife. She likes to watch horror movies and collect stuffed dinosaurs, much to his dismay. Whenever she and Yocchi have a fight, often over trivial matters, they end up going to the Noharas for advice and often reconcile by deciding they do not want to become like Hiroshi and Misae. She is known as Gidgy in the Vitello and Phuuz dubs.

Nushiyo Ooya (大家 主代, Ōya Nushiyo)
Voiced by: Kōko Kagawa (Japanese); Julie Mayfield (Funimation) (English)
The landlord of "Falling Apartments", who strictly enforces rules such as being quiet in the halls and not allowing pets. She is possessive of the apartments because they are the only remnant of her late husband, who died in a car accident along with their three-year-old daughter. In the manga, she is shown as a midwife to Midori, who went into labor in at the apartments while returning a book to Misae, and assisted in the birth of her daughter. In the Funimation dub, Shinnosuke refers to her as Manlady.

Yonro (四郎, Yonrō)
Voiced by: Toshiharu Sakurai (Japanese); Christopher Sabat (Funimation) (English)
The Nohara family's neighbor at "Falling Apartments", who works at a supermarket. Misae and Hiroshi had mistakenly believed that he attended Tokyo University rather than Tokyo Kasukabe University and often invited him over to fancy dinners to be supportive of him so that when he eventually entered a political career, he would thank them with money and gifts. After learning their mistake, they continue to support him by providing him with food after learning that he failed the university entrance exams multiple times. Even after the Noharas move back to their old house, he continues to visit. The Funimation dub depicts him as a stereotypical nerd.

Atsuko Kutsuzoko (屈底 厚子, Kutsuzoko Atsuko)
Voiced by: Hiromi Ishikawa (Japanese); Tiffany Grant (Funimation) (English)
An 18-year-old housewife who lives in "Falling Apartments" opposite to the Noharas. Her husband is a truck-driver, so she mostly lives alone with her two-year old daughter. Being the only other woman in the apartment to have a child, she soon befriends Misae.
She is known as Summer in the Funimation dub, where she is depicted as an American with a valley girl accent who moved to Japan trying to find the father of her daughter, whom she only knew from a one night stand.

Atsumi Kutsuzoko (屈底 アツミ, Kutsuzoko Atsumi)
Voiced by: Saori Sugimoto (Japanese); Leah Clark (Funimation) (English)
Atsuko's two-year-old daughter. She is known as Paris in the Funimation dub, where she is depicted as being a seven-year-old dwarf.

Yuu Yakutsukuri (役津栗 優, Yakutsukuri Yū)
Voiced by: Makiko Ōmoto (Japanese); Jennifer Green (Funimation) (English)
The resident of room 203 at "Falling Apartments", who dreams of becoming an actress and often wears outlandish costumes in order to practice for auditions. With help from Shinnosuke, she is able to pass the interview aimed at hiring new actresses for television soaps and then moves out of "Falling Apartments".

Junichi Ishizaka (石坂 純一, Ishizaka Jun'ichi)
Voiced by: Naoki Bandō (Japanese); Kevin M. Connolly (Funimation) (English)
Midori's 26-year-old husband, who is easygoing and gets along well with Shinnosuke and his friends, but lacks confidence.
He is known as Ricky in the Vitello and Phuuz dubs and Doyle in the Funimation dub, where he is depicted as a telepath and popcorn salesman. In season 3, he is sent to federal prison after accidentally popping an army colonel in his man-sized popcorn machine.

Tokurou Gyouda (行田 徳郎, Gyōda Tokurō)
Voiced by: Kazuhiko Inoue
Ume Matsuzaka's 28-year-old boyfriend, who worked as a chiropractor and archaeologist and is fascinated by all kinds of bones. He and Ume met when she broke her leg and was admitted to the hospital where he worked. He died in an explosion during an expedition with his professor in Africa, though this only happened in the manga, not the anime.

Shiizou Atsukuru (熱繰 椎造, Atsukuru Shiizō)
Voiced by: Kazunari Tanaka (Japanese); Todd Haberkorn (Funimation) (English)
A 21-year-old man who worked as a staff member at the Futaba Kindergarten. In the manga, he is depicted as a substitute teacher for Midori while she was pregnant, but in the anime, where Midori's pregnancy is not shown, he is instead depicted as a temporary teacher hired to train the Sunflower class for the annual sports event as part of his internship. Despite his hot-blooded nature, Atsukuru is afraid of rabbits due to a childhood incident in which a rabbit bit his finger. At first, many of the students are taken aback and annoyed by his passionate way of teaching, but over time they grow to like him. Nene, however, dislikes him because of his emphasis on "masculine" games, to the point where she refuses to attend the kindergarten because of him, saying that she will return when Atsukuru can hug her stuffed rabbits, which he initially refuses to do. However, with Shinnosuke's help, he overcomes his fear of rabbits. In the Funimation dub, he is a recess teacher and a mutant known as The Flamer, who can set himself on fire at will. He believes in natural selection and wants to eliminate all normal people.

== Other characters ==
Mrs. Takakura (高倉夫人, Takakura-fujin)
Voiced by: Roko Takizawa
Takakura's wife and the vice principal of Futaba Kindergarten.

Semashi Nohara (野原せまし, Nohara Semashi)
Voiced by: Yoshimasa Hosoya
A 40-year-old man who is Hiroshi's brother and Shinnosuke and Himawari's uncle. He works as a farmer and often argues with Hiroshi. Later, he starts dating Ikuna Ogano, who is Itsuki and Natsuki's mother, and later marries her.

Masae Koyama (小山 まさえ, Koyama Masae)
Voiced by: Tomoko Miyadera
A 35-year-old woman who is Misae's older sister and Shinnosuke and Himawari's aunt. She works at the same middle school where her father once taught Japanese literature and usually appears to be elegantly dressed in kimono and well-spoken, but is prone to the same antics as Shinnosuke and Ginnosuke. She is known as Minnie in the Vitello and Phuuz dubs.

Nene's father (ネネちゃんのパパ, Nene-chan no Papa)
Voiced by: Shinya Ōtaki
Nene's father, who likes to go to cherry blossom festivals and invite the Nohara family to, much to his wife's chagrin. He is known as Bill Milfer in the Funimation dub, where he never appears onscreen. However, it is implied that he is abusive to Penny and her mother, but stops his behavior after being charged with DWI and attending an anger management class.

Kazama's father (風間くんのパパ, Kazama-kun no Papa)
Voiced by: Junichi Kanemaru
An architect who is implied to be richer than most of the parents of Shinnosuke's friends, but is rarely at home because he often has to travel abroad. He is easy-going and gets along well with others, including the Nohara family. In the Funimation dub, he is depicted as an American diplomat.

Masao's father (マサオの父親, Masao kun no Papa)
A salaryman who, according to his father, was part of a rock band prior to his marriage.

Bo's mother (ボーちゃんのママ, Bō-chan no Mama)
Bo's mother has appeared only once in manga & never in anime.

Yoshiko (よしこ, Yoshiko)
Voiced by: Yūko Mizutani
Misae's old friend who is a manga artist.

Buriburizaemon (ぶりぶりざえもん, Buriburizaemon)
Voiced by: Kaneto Shiozawa (1992–2000), Hiroshi Kamiya (2016–present) (Japanese); Justin Cook (Funimation) (English)
A cowardly talking pig who appears in some of the episodes and chapters set in ancient Japan. Despite being a product of Shinnosuke's imagination, he is treated as an actual character. His major appearances in the anime were initially limited following Shiozawa's death in 2000, and did not have a speaking role until 2010 when he appears in the alternate reality "SHIN-MEN" episodes as a group of five evil clones called "TON-MEN". On May 13, 2016, he returned permanently, now voiced by Hiroshi Kamiya, from episode 894-2 "The Adventures of Buriburizaemon: The Revival Chapter" (ぶりぶりざえもんの冒険 覚醒編) on. He appears as a major character in the TV special "Crayon Wars", a parody of Star Wars. In the special, he plays the role of Han Solo, and is referred to as Leonardo DeCaburio (レオナルド・デカぶりオ, Reonarudo Dekaburio), a play on Leonardo DiCaprio. He is known as Big-a-zoid in the Vitello and Phuuz dubs and Brave Pig in the LUK Internacional dub. In the Funimation dub, he appears in the dubbed version of the "Crayon Wars" special, which is retitled "Shin Wars", and in which he is referred to as Ham Solo, though this name was later used for non-Star Wars based cameos in later episodes.

Action Mask (アクション仮面, Akushon Kamen)
Voiced by: Tesshō Genda (Japanese); Pat Fraley (Vitello), Troy Baker (Funimation) (English)
A live-action superhero from "Action Planet" (アクション星, Akushon Sei) who is a parody of tokusatsu shows, most notably Kamen Rider. In the theatrical movie, his origin is changed. Instead of coming from "Action Planet", he is stated to have been rescued from a fatal accident by Professor Kitakasukabe and given superpowers through advanced technology. In 2014, a spin-off manga series based on Action Mask was published in Monthly Action Magazine from Futabasha. It is available on Crunchyroll outside Japan. He is known as Masked Muchacho in the Vitello and Phuuz dubs, Action Kamen in the Indian dub, Action Mask in the Filipino dub and Action Bastard in the Funimation dub.

Gotarō Gō (郷 剛太郎, Gō Gotarō)
Action Mask's civilian form, who is a movie stuntman. In the spin-off manga, he goes undercover in Saitama to investigate a series of incidents in which people have been implanted with "seeds" that turn them into monsters through hatred. He transforms into Action Mask to fight these monsters, but instead of using violence, he reasons with them to get them to express their feelings, freeing them from their hatred. This exposes the seed and allows him to use his Action Beam to release the seed from its host. In the Funimation dub, he is known as Bruce Bastard and it is stated that he was orphaned after a mugger killed his parents and that Doc found him as a baby in a spaceship, and that he was bitten by a radioactive bastard at a Native American burial ground. This parodies the origins of several western superheroes, most notably Batman, Superman, and Spider-Man.

Mimiko Sakura (桜 ミミ子, Sakura Mimiko)
Voiced by: Etsuko Kozakura (Japanese); Kate Oxley (Funimation) (English)
Action Mask's sidekick, who provides him with weapons and information, though often gets captured, requiring him to save her. In the spin-off manga, she is an adult working as Dr. Kitakasukabe's assistant and monitoring Gō's progress.
She is known as Loli Pop in the Funimation dub.

Professor Gō (郷博士, Gō Hakase)
Voiced by: Rokurō Naya (Japanese); Jerry Russell (Funimation) (English)
The inventor of Action Mask's weapons and vehicles, which he uses to fight evil. In the spinoff manga and theatrical movie, he is replaced by a similar character named Professor Kitakasukabe (北春日部博士, Kitakasukabe Hakase).
He is known as Doc in the Funimation dub, in which it is stated that he found an orphaned Action Bastard

MekeMeke Z (メケメケＺ, MekeMeke Z)
Voiced by: Takeshi Aono
Action Mask's archenemy and the leader of the Black MekeMeke Group (ブラックメケメケ団, Burakku MekeMeke Dan). He is a robot with advanced intelligence who can use his own versions of Action Mask's techniques. He also has two weaker versions of himself: MekeMeke X and MekeMeke Y.

Sea Slug Secretary Bijou (うみうし長官ビジョー, Umiushi Chōkan Bijō)
The first of the Black MekeMeke Group's "Black Four Heavenly Kings" (ブラック四天王, Burakku Shiten'nō). She is a woman wearing a heart-shaped head covering and a cape.

Chimpan Admiral Monkikki (チンパン提督モンキッキー, Chinpan Teitoku Monkikkī)
The second of the "Black Four Heavenly Kings". He is a chimpanzee with a long white beard who wears an admiral's uniform. He has a son, Yankikki.

Mantis General Girigiri (カマキリ将軍ギリギリ, Kamakiri Shōgun Girigiri)
The third of the "Black Four Heavenly Kings". He is an insect-like humanoid who resembles a praying mantis.

Iguana Minister Zubizuba (イグアナ大臣ズビズバ, Kamakiri Shōgun Girigiri)
The fourth and final member of the "Black Four Heavenly Kings". He is a humanoid iguana who wields a sword.

Eagle Head (イーグルヘッド, Iguru Heddo)
Voiced by: Jūrōta Kosugi (Japanese); Michael Sinterniklaas (Funimation) (English)
The leader of the Sparrow Group (スズメ団, Suzume Dan), who Action Mask encounters during the "Action Mask Fever" story arc. It is later revealed that he is Mimiko's missing older brother, who Tsubainbach brainwashed. His outfit and name are reminiscent of Gatchaman and its protagonist, Ken the Eagle. He is known as Flying Pecker in the Funimation dub. He appears in the Lucky Bastard Fever serial, and is later revealed to be man named Phillippe, who was arranged to marry until he was brainwashed.

Richard von Tsubainbach (リヒャルト・フォン・ツバインバッハ, Rihyaruto fon Tsubainbahha)
The mastermind behind the Sparrow Group and the true villain of the "Action Mask Fever" story arc. He is a genius mad scientist who was an acquaintance of Professor Gō when they attended school together.
In the Funimation dub, he is known as Dr. Hitlerclone due to his resemblance to Adolf Hitler and speaks with a German accent.

Baron Flower (フラワー男爵, Furawā Danshaku)
A villain characterized by his chivalrous attitude towards women, especially Mimiko. He is portrayed by an actor who Misae and Himawari think is handsome, causing them to watch Action Mask whenever he appears in an episode. In the Funimation dub, he is known as The Deflowerer.

Misato Yashio
A character who only appears in the spin-off manga. She is a fan of tokusatsu who first encounters Gō when he transforms into Action Mask to save her from a monster who has a hatred for children, and is surprised to see him attempt to reason with it.

Bal
A character who only appears in the spin-off manga. It is a ghostly entity who assists Gō in transforming into Action Mask and exposing the monsters' seeds.

Kantam Robo (カンタムロボ, Kantamu Robo)
Voiced by: Shinya Ōtaki
Shinnosuke's favorite anime character, who is a parody of the mecha genre. The name "Kantam" is a parody of Gundam, as the Katakana characters ga (ガ) and da (ダ) in "Gundam" (ガンダム, Gandamu) are replaced with the characters ka (カ) and ta (タ), respectively. Kantam is made up of two units – the main robot and an identical smaller robot which pilots the main robot. He is known as Psycho Robotico in the Vitello and Phuuz dubs, Quantum Robot in Indian dub and Robo Grinder in the Funimation dub.

John Yamada (山田ジョン, Yamada Jyon)
Voiced by: Yoshiko Matsuo
Kantam's human partner, who helps the smaller Kantam pilot the main robot and Kantam to change form.

President Gilkilos (ギルキロス大統領, Girukirosu Daitōryō)
Voiced by: Takeshi Watabe, Takeshi Aono
The main antagonist of Kantam Robo and the leader of the Midnight Secret Society (秘密結社ミッドナイト).

Kaizam Robo (カイザムロボ, Kaizamu Robo)
Voiced by: Kōji Ishii
Kantam's older brother and rival, who works for President Gilkilos and Midnight.

Fire SHIN-MEN Gou (ファイヤーSHIN-MEN ゴゥ, Faiyaa SHIN-MEN Gou)
Voiced by: Keiko Toda
A member of the SHIN-MEN who is similar to Shinnosuke in personality. He is lazy and finds crime fighting boring, but will fight to defend and impress woman. He has the power of fire.

Wind SHIN-MEN Hyuu (ウィンドSHIN-MEN ヒュー, Uindo SHIN-MEN Hyuu)
Voiced by: Takahiro Mizushima
The leader of the SHIN-MEN, who has the power of wind and can fly.

Iron SHIN-MEN Can (アイアンSHIN-MEN カン, Aian SHIN-MEN Kan)
Voiced by: Mitsuki Saiga
A member of the SHIN-MEN who has two identical sisters. She has a body made of iron and can shapeshift. Because of her tough body, she tends to recklessly rush into situations.

Water SHIN-MEN Sui (ウォーターSHIN-MEN スィ, Uootaa SHIN-MEN Sui)
Voiced by: Yukiji
A member of the SHIN-MEN who often jokes around and, like Gou, likes to flirt with women, but does not see them as a reason to fight. He has the power of water as long as he is hydrated; without water, he shrinks down.

Plant SHIN-MEN Nyoki (プラントSHIN-MEN ニョキ)
Voiced by: Hiroyuki Yoshino
A member of the SHIN-MEN who has the power of plants, but, like Sui, his powers are dependent upon water, as a lack of water causes him to shrivel up and become ineffectual.

Piroshi (ピロシ, Piroshi)
Voiced by: Keiji Fujiwara
A single man who is the owner of a ramen shop. He takes care of Gou because he is too lazy to take care of himself.

Motohisa (もとひさ, Motohisa)
A bratty child who is obsessed with western and ninja films. He requests a duel against the new kid on the block after falling in love with Nene and seeking to win her heart, but is unsuccessful.

Atsushi Kutsuzoko (屈底 アツシ, Kutsuzoko Atsushi)
Atsuko's husband, who works as a truck driver. He only appears in the manga.

Kyuji Oda (汚田 急痔, Oda Kyūji)
Voiced by: Jun Fukuyama
An undercover police officer who works with Kyousuke on a narcotics control case; they are renting room 204 of 'Falling Apartments' in the anime and 205 in the manga and pose as father and son so as not to draw suspicion. He is known as Barnie Ota in the Funimation dub, in which they instead pose as a gay couple. Although this is used as a cover, it is implied that Ota has genuine feelings for his partner, who is oblivious.

Kyousuke Nigariya (にがりや 京助, Nigariya Kyōsuke)
Voiced by: Takkō Ishimori
An undercover police officer who works with Kyuji. In order to not raise suspicion, he pretends to be Kyuji's father. He is known as Ken Nakatomi in the Funimation dub, in which they instead pose as a gay couple. Although this is used as a cover, it is implied that Ota has genuine feelings for him, which he is oblivious to.

Momo Ishizaka (石坂 もも, Ishizaka Momo)
Midori and Junichi's daughter, who only appears in the manga.

Matsu Matsuzaka (まつざか 松, Matsuzaka Matsu)
Voiced by: Masako Katsuki
Ume's eldest sister. Age 28. Like her sister, she is also seeking for a man to form a relationship and eventually marry. Often, when news comes of Ume going on a date or participating in a matchmaking ceremony, Matsu and her other sister, Take, would interfere to win that man's affections, leading to the three sisters fighting over him, and it eventually ends with the man she is interested in escaping from the sisters. A similar situation transpired when Ume started dating Tokurou.

Take Matsuzaka (まつざか 竹, Matsuzaka Take)
Voiced by: Kei Hayami
A 26-year-old woman who is Ume's second eldest sister and often fights with her elder sister, Matsu, over Ume's new boyfriend. In contrast to Matsu's traditional Japanese-style attire, Take often wears Western attire.

Mysterious Magical Girl Mari-chan (ふしぎ魔女っ子マリーちゃん, Fushigi Majokko Marī-chan)
The eponymous main character of a fictional TV show parodying the magical girl genre which Kazama is a fan of, but too ashamed to admit this. She is known as Mary, the Mysterious Magician in the LUK Internacional dub

Magical Girl Moe-P (ま・ほー少女もえＰ, Mahō Shōjo Moe-Pī)
Voiced by: Sakura Nogawa (Japanese); Cherami Leigh (Funimation) (English)
A moe-driven magical girl parody which Kazama is a fan of, but too ashamed to admit this. She is known as Yaz Heiressz in the Funimation dub, in which she becomes rich after her father's death and she gets his inheritance.

Shirimarudashi (シリマルダシ, Shirimarudashi)
A fictional monster that Shin-chan owns a toy of, who is a parody of Godzilla. He is known as Bare-Ass Godzilla in the Funimation dub.

Shinobu Sakai (酒井 しのぶ, Sakai Shinobu)
Voiced by: Miki Itō, Kumiko Nishihara
A college student who has held many part-time jobs to get through college, but often loses them due to Shinnosuke's antics. She despises him because of this, but has to put up with him because of her frequent customer service jobs. Eventually she gets a permanent job in the lost child department of the local Action Department Store, where Shin-chan gets frequently lost & thus ends up under her supervision.

Kenta Musashino (武蔵野 剣太, Musashino Kenta)
Voiced by: Kenji Nojima (Japanese); Travis Willingham (Funimation) (English)
A 34-year-old man and Shinnosuke's kendo master. In the Funimation dub, he is a paranoid schizophrenic who believes that Shin is "Dildor", a fabled hero who is destined to destroy "Sluteris, the Fly Lord's evil mistress". In season 3, it s stated that he died while in Afghanistan.

Razaya Dan (団 羅座也, Dan Razaya)
Voiced by: Chafurin
A newscaster whose show Misae often watches. His name is derived from Dan Rather. He is known as Sam Donarshin in the Vitello and Phuuz dubs.

Usuto Yoshii (よしい うすと, Yoshii Usuto)
Voiced by: Takaya Hashi
A famous manga artist who lives in the same neighborhood as Shinnosuke and often gets ideas from him. His name comes from series creator Yoshito Usui, with the initials reversed. He is known as Marty Flang in the Vitello and Phuuz dubs.

Yoshito Usui (臼井儀人, Usui Yoshito)
The creator of the manga, who sometimes makes cameo appearances in the movies and the series. In the full-length movies, his character is younger and dresses in colorful suits while singing karaoke. He is either seen practicing for a karaoke event or asking for directions to a karaoke event.

Kuriyo Urima (売間 久里代, Urima Kuriyo)
A 29-year-old woman from Sendai who works as a door-to-door saleswoman for a company that makes books and audio cassette tapes for children. Unfortunately for her, her appearance tends to scare young children, resulting in low sales. In her first appearances in the anime, the character had a male voiceover, with male body features (like a slight beard), causing Shinchan to mistake her for a transvestite man. These features were removed in later versions of over allegations of transphobia.

Nene's stuffed bunny (ネネちゃん家のウサギのぬいぐるみ)
Voiced by: Akiko Yajima (Japanese); Jerry Jewell (Funimation) (English)
A stuffed rabbit which Nene and her mother own and use as a punching bag to vent their anger. It is known as Happiness Bunny in the Funimation dub, and sometimes comes to life under the light of a red moon and takes revenge on Penny and her mother for the treatment it has received.

Shinko-chan (しんこちゃん, Shinko-chan)
A girl from the future who resembles Shinnosuke but is the opposite of him in many ways, as she is tactful, empathetic, and sees the good qualities in those she meets.

Shin Godzilla (シン・ゴジラ, Shin Gojira)
(Also known as Godzilla (ゴジラ, Shin Gojira) in the episode "Shinnosuke vs Shin Godzilla"), is Shin Chan's opponent who emerged from Tokyo Bay and was defeated when Shin Chan fired a chemical down his throat
