= Cynthia Cranz =

American voice actress

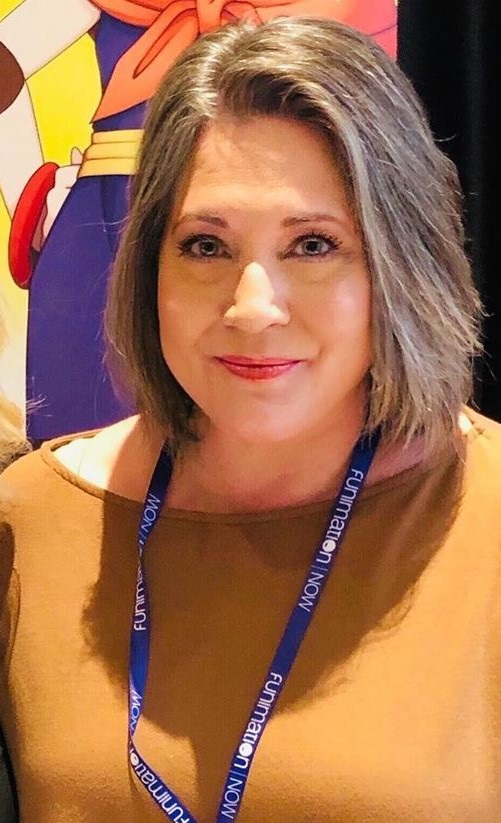
- Cranz at the 2019 Dallas Comic Show.
- Occupation: Voice actress
- Years active: 1999–present

Cynthia Cranz is an American voice actress. She is best known as the teenage and adult voice of Chi-Chi in the Dragon Ball series, Botan in Yu Yu Hakusho, Pipimi in Pop Team Epic from Ep. 11A, Mitzi Nohara in Shin-chan, and Mitch Tennison in Case Closed.

== Filmography ==
=== Anime ===
- Ace Attorney – Sister Bikini (Season 2)
- Aria the Scarlet Ammo – Landlady (Ep. 13 OVA)
- B Gata H Kei – Ms. Akai
- B't X – Karin, Gaku, Hokuto's Mother (Neo)
- Barakamon – Emi Handa (Handa-kun spin-off series)
- Bamboo Blade – Kirino's Mother (Ep. 16)
- BECK: Mongolian Chop Squad – Koyuki's Mother
- Beet the Vandel Buster – Arin
- Big Windup! – Maria Momoe
- Birdy the Mighty: Decode 02 – Takumi (Ep. 3)
- Black Blood Brothers – Sayuka Shiramine (EP. 6)
- Boogiepop and Others – Makiko's Mom (Ep. 11)
- Case Closed – Mitch Tennison, various
- A Certain Scientific Railgun series – Head Resident
- Chain Chronicle -The Light of Haecceitas- – Dilma (Ep. 4)
- Chio's School Road – Momo's Homeroom Teacher
- Citrus – Mineko Fuji
- City Hunter: Shinjuku Private Eyes – Ai's Mother
- Corpse Princess – Rika Aragami
- D.Gray-man – Sarah (Ep. 29-30)
- Darker than Black – Shizuka Isozaki (EP. 19-20)
- Date A Live III – Shiizaki
- Deadman Wonderland OVA – Hinata Mukai
- The Devil Is a Part-Timer! – Miki Shiba
- Dr. Stone – Alumi
- Dragon Ball – Chi-Chi (Teen), various
- Dragon Ball Z – Chi-Chi (Teen/Adult), various (as well as Kai series)
- Dragon Ball GT – Chi-Chi
- Dragon Ball Super – Chi-Chi, various
- Dragonar Academy – Frieda Shelley
- Dragonaut – The Resonance – Shelly (Ep. 6-8)
- Eden of the East – Misae (Ep. 3)
- Fafner in the Azure: Heaven and Earth – Yumiko Hino
- Fruits Basket series – Tohru's Aunt, Kisa's Mother, Mii, Mitsuru (2019 series)
- Fullmetal Alchemist series – Paninya
- The Galaxy Railways – Liza (Ep. 10), Ine (Ep. 12)
- Ghost Hunt – Noriko Morishita (Ep. 4-6)
- Ghost in the Shell: Arise – Yoko Kitahara
- Glass Fleet – Muscat
- Gonna be the Twin-Tail!! – Emu Shindo
- Gunslinger Girl series – Ferro
- Heaven's Lost Property – Sohara's Mother
- Hell Girl – Yuko (Ep. 11), Ryoko's Mother (Ep. 2)
- High School DxD – Mira
- Karneval – Nima
- Kaze no Stigma – Toru (Ep. 7)
- Kenichi: The Mightiest Disciple – Saori Shirahama
- Kiddy Grade – Marianne
- King of Thorn – Mallory Bridge
- Kodocha – Hisae Kumagai
- Linebarrels of Iron – Chisato Hayase
- Lupin III: The Pursuit of Harimao's Treasure – Diana
- Maria the Virgin Witch – Bonne (Ep. 1-2, 6-9)
- Michiko & Hatchin – Joanna Belenbauza Yamada (Hana's Foster Mother, Ep. 1)
- Mushishi – Biki's Mother (Ep. 2), Saku (Ep. 11)
- Negima! series – Kū Fei
- No-Rin – Hisako Nakazawa
- Nobunagun – Ogura's Mother
- Ōkami-san and her Seven Companions – Ringo's Mother (Ep. 9)
- One Piece – Bellemère, Chi-Chi (Ep. 590), various
- Peach Girl – Etsuko, Suzu
- Phantom: Requiem for the Phantom – Kelly Reynolds (Ep. 4)
- Ping Pong: The Animation – Emiko (Eps. 7, 10)
- Pop Team Epic – Pipimi (Ep. 11a), Daichi's Mother (Ep. 1)
- Princess Jellyfish – Chieko
- Puzzle & Dragons X – Sidonia
- Rideback – Kei Yoda
- Rin ~Daughters of Mnemosyne – Yoko Todoroki
- Romeo x Juliet – Benvolio's Mother, Hermione's Mother
- Rosario + Vampire Capu2 – Tsurara Shirayuki (Mizore's Mother)
- The Sacred Blacksmith – Justina Albright
- Sakura Quest – Masami Nunobe (Ep. 12-13)
- Save Me! Lollipop – School Nurse (Ep. 9)
- School Rumble – Hanai's Mother (Ep. 13)
- Shiki – Nao Yasumori
- Shin-chan (Funimation dub) – Mitzi Nohara (Shin's Mother)
- Soul Eater – Lisa
- Space Dandy – Meow's Mother (Ep. 10)
- Spiral: The Bonds of Reasoning – Reiko Hatsuyama
- Star Blazers 2199 – Maki Kodai (Ep. 14)
- Summer Wars – Rika Jinnouchi
- Trinity Blood – Lilith Sahl (Ep. 24)
- Tsubasa: Reservoir Chronicle – Kurogane's Mother (Ep. 40), Suwa (Ep. 41)
- Tsukuyomi: Moon Phase – Shizuru (Hazuki's Mother)
- Valkyrie Drive: Mermaid – Torino Kazami
- Witchblade – Kyoko Sasaki (Ep. 24), Kei
- Yurikuma Arashi – Reia Tsubaki
- Yu Yu Hakusho – Botan

=== Video games ===
- Case Closed: The Mirapolis Investigation – Mitch Tennison
- Dragon Ball Z: Budokai – Chi-Chi
- Dragon Ball Z: Budokai 3 – Chi-Chi
- Dragon Ball Z: Budokai Tenkaichi 2 – Chi-Chi
- Dragon Ball Z: Budokai Tenkaichi 3 – Chi-Chi
- Dragon Ball Z: Harukanaru Densetsu – Chi-Chi
- Dragon Ball Z: Kakarot – Chi-Chi
- Monster Tale – Ethan
- Spikeout: Battle Street – Additional voices
- Super Dragon Ball Z – Chi-Chi
- Dragon Ball FighterZ – Chi-Chi
- Dragon Ball Legends – Chi-Chi
- Yu Yu Hakusho: Dark Tournament – Botan
