= List of Negima! Magister Negi Magi characters =

The Negima! Magister Negi Magi manga and anime series features a wide cast of fictional characters designed by Ken Akamatsu. The series follows Negi Springfield, a 10-year-old boy from Wales with magic powers, who becomes a teacher of a Japanese middle school class of 31 girls. He discovers he is able to unlock many of the girls' magical powers as they assist him in his adventures. He and his students encounter a number of characters, friends and foes, many of whom have magic powers or are connected to the Magical World, and some even have connections to his estranged father.

== Main characters ==
=== Negi Springfield ===
Voiced by: Rina Satō (Japanese); Greg Ayres (English)
live action actor: Yukina Kashiwa

Negi Springfield (ネギ・スプリングフィールド, Negi Supuringufīrudo) is a mage in-training and the homeroom and English teacher of Class 2-A/3-A of Mahora Academy Middle School for girls. He is the son of Nagi Springfield, known as the legendary "Thousand Master", and Arika Anarchia Entheofushia, princess and last Queen of the Vespertatia Empire in the magic world, known as "Queen of Calamity". He is raised by his cousin and the people around his small village because of his father's disappearance. After numerous demons attack his village, he is saved by Nagi, who gives Negi his staff and mysteriously leaves. Negi, determined to find his father, quickly joins a magic academy and graduates at the age of ten under the kazoe system which makes him nine years old as the kazoe system starts a newborn infant at 1 and adds a year every New Years. He is sent to Japan to act as a teacher at Mahora Academy as part of his training.

Negi quickly bonds with most of his students, especially Asuna, and many learn of his magical background. Several develop feelings for Negi, citing his maturity for his age, and the fact that he will be suitable to be with in five years. Also, he eventually meets Kotaro, who eventually becomes his closest friend/rival. He forms a number of pactio with most of his students, which helps him to become stronger. He tends to overwork himself, often hurting himself for the sake of others. He is still childlike in various ways, such as hating baths, sleeping in the same bed as his sister, resulting in him clutching anyone nearby while he is away from her, and being rather naive and gullible.

Negi is a master of basic magic, though he is initially lacking in battle experience. He eventually becomes a master of using delayed spells as a battle tactic. He initially uses wind and light magic, though he begins to master lightning spells as well. He later trains under Kū Fei in martial arts to make up for his weakness in close combat, advancing very quickly (even learning how to do instant movement, otherwise known as shundou), and applies a strong magical barrier around himself to avoid damaging his frail body. His proficiency at learning is shown when he masters techniques Kū Fei says would usually take a month in only three hours. He also trains under Evangeline and Jack Rakan, which increases his combat and magical capability exponentially.

He also learns and improves upon Evangeline's "Magia Erebea" to "load (supplementum)" & infuse the body with magic (Supplementum Pro Armationem).

- "Hell's Refining Fire (Sim Fabricatus Ab Incendio)": Absorbing the magic from the "Flames of Hell (Incendium Gehennae)" strengthens physical resilience and creates resistance to heat. The sinister nature of the magic also absorbs magic from living things upon physical contact.
- "Lightning Speed (Agilitas Fulminas)": Absorbing the magic from "Thunderous Gale (Jovis Tempestas Fulguriens)" grants the caster extreme mobility and "lightning attribute" to his physical attacks, as well as granting some immunity to weather magic.
- "Thunder in Heaven, Great Vigor (Ê Astrapê Uper Ouranou Mega Dunamenê)": Absorbing the magic from "Thousand Lightning Bolts (Kilipl Astrapê)" transmogrifies Negi into a mass of electrically charged particles capable of incredible speeds by becoming lightning with a type of lightning-style Shundō called Raisoku Shundō (雷速瞬動, lit. "Lightning-speed Teleportation").
- "Thunder in Heaven, Great Vigor 2 (Tastrapê Uper Ouranou Mega Dunamenê)": Absorbing two "Thousand Lightning Bolts" spells, Negi obtains a "constant lightning form", liken to a high-level lightning spirit, he can maintain lightning-speed indefinitely. Also with "Twin Vigor", both Negi's physical maneuverability and mental-processes increase dramatically, overcoming the fundamental weaknesses of the regular "Great Vigor".

He also came up with a new spell: "Spell Synthesis: Lightning God Lance: Titan Slayer" which is a new high class lightning spell that he used to lure Jack Rakan into a trap in their gladiator match. Negi is also able to use a magic circle to stop and absorb an opponent's power in order to use their own strength against them (Agite Extractio, Negica Magia Erebea: Circuli Absorptionis Ex Tempore). Negi used this ability to fight Rakan to a draw. According to Evangeline's spirit clone, this is the ultimate ability of Magia Erebia, one that not even she was able to master. He developed these abilities of Raisoku Shundou, Perpetual Lightning Form, Spell Synthesis and enemy magic absorption in ten days; Jack Rakan noting that any one would be enough to impress the most advanced professors of magic development. In a recent chapter, Negi lost control of Magia Erebea while fighting his father's old comrade, Governor General Kurt Godel. As of Chapter 314 Negi has mastered his inner demon, and in doing so, has become something that can't be called human. In later chapters it has been stated that Negi has become an immortal/vampire like Evangeline. Later is revealed in UQ Holder! that he confessed his love for Chisame, marrying her some years after he rescued his father from the Mage of the Beginning.

He also forms a probationary contract (pactio) with Theo and is awarded the Mile Vincula (The Thousand Bonds), a passport-holder-like artifact that allows him to freely use his partners' artifacts. Ken Akamatsu has noted, however, that Negi cancelled the contract after his match with Jack Rakan was finished; he should no longer be able to use his exceedingly rare artifact.

=== Asuna Kagurazaka ===
Voiced by: Akemi Kanda (Japanese); Luci Christian (English)
Live-action actor: Sara Wakatsuki, Mirai Kamiyama (young)

Asuna Kagurazaka (神楽坂 明日菜, Kagurazaka Asuna) is student number eight in the class, and the lead female character. In the first season, the OADs and the manga, she has heterochromia (in the second season and early OVA's both eyes are of the same color) and appears to be 14 or 15 years old, but her exact age is unknown, as her name was mentioned in a video that occurred 21 years ago. She is very short-tempered and quick to resort to violence (especially towards Negi), though she is very protective of those close to her. Asuna has a crush on her former home room teacher, Takahata, and she spends a significant amount of time attempting to become closer to him. She bonds with Negi after he becomes her teacher, though she is initially wary of him.

It is later revealed to Evangeline and Negi that she is actually Asuna Vesperina Theotanasia Entheofushia, a princess of the fallen country of Vespertatia (whose capital used to be the ruined city of Ostia), who was saved by Nagi and his group. She is also The Imperial Princess of Twilight, the one with the power from the time of the Gods which is "the power to create worlds, and the power to destroy them". She occasionally has dreams regarding her past, but cannot recall them at will due to Takahata erasing her memory. Negi states that she has the same look and smell as Nekane Springfield. She also has the natural ability to cancel magic, which is an exceedingly rare ability. A number of Asuna's character traits and design are inspired by Naru Narusegawa from Love Hina, Ken Akamatsu's previous work, including her attraction to an older man/teacher, and violent personality towards the protagonist. While she claims to hate children, she is easily the closest in the class to Negi, which leads a number of her classmates believe the relationship is romantic, a claim that she repeatedly denies. Although she denies having feelings for Negi, it has been hinted throughout the story that she harbors some form of love towards him, though it may just be brotherly, it has not been explicitly expressed.

After forming a pactio with Negi, she gains the artifact "Ensis Exorcizans" (Blade of Exorcism), which can take the form of either a harisen or a massive sword, which enhances her natural ability to cancel magic. Initially, she can only summon the harisen on command, however she is later able to call upon both at will. She also has a degree of mastery over Kankahō (咸卦法, also, xiánguàfǎ), a strong combination of magic and ki which enhances all of her abilities. Although her memories are erased by Takahata, they are restored by Fate.

She is somehow related to Negi Springfield (Although Cousin/Aunt fit well as Asuna's older sister is Negi's mother), though the specifics of this relation are unknown, and she is the only relative of Negi's that lives in Japan. She became Negi's guardian before she knew their familial bond. It is implied that her real age is around 25 years old, however she is about 15 years old in both civil registration and physical appearance. That makes her one of the look-younger-than-her-real-age girls in Negi's class (the others are Evangeline A.K. McDowell, the twins and the ghost.)

In the anime and manga, Asuna is the Red Baka Ranger (known as the Dummy Force in the English anime), a group widely accepted as the most unintelligent in the class. However, the Baka Rangers are seen as capable of performing great feats either by luck or by strong physical prowess.

== Mahora Girls' Jr. High Class 2/3-A ==
Class 2/3-A's seat plan

Class 2/3-A is considered one of the most rambunctious classes in the school known for energetic students. Though not all of them are aware of the fact, the class contains a wide assortment of characters, from the usual student athletes, bookworms, and cheerleaders, as well a ghost, an android, a vampire, a demon, two half-demons, a girl with super agility and strength, two super-geniuses (one of whom is from the future), a ninja, and a kung fu master. Even before Negi became the homeroom teacher of the class, already 8 out of the 31 students knew about magic.

=== Sayo Aisaka ===
Voiced by: Yuri Shiratori (Japanese); Kate Bristol (English)
Live-action actor: Mai Nishida

Sayo Aisaka (相坂 さよ, Aisaka Sayo) is student number one in the class. She still goes to the same class, and sits in the same seat, which always remains empty. She desperately attempts to make friends, though she always ends up being treated as an evil spirit. While trying to scare people as a ghost, she fails miserably and often trips, despite not having feet. After Negi starts teaching the class, she is eventually noticed by him over time.

After befriending much of the class, she becomes very close with Kazumi, often helping her by spying for her journalism reports. Kazumi later obtains a doll from Evangeline that Sayo can possess and control, which allows her to leave the school campus and go with Negi's group to the Magic World. She later gains a robotic body similar to Chachamaru, though she controls it from the inside with her doll body.

=== Yūna Akashi ===
Voiced by: Madoka Kimura (Japanese); Amber Cotton (English)
Live-action actor: Mayo Yamamoto

Yūna Akashi (明石 裕奈, Akashi Yūna) is student number two in the class and an active member in the sports clubs. Her father is Professor Akashi, one of the Mage-teachers at the Academy, though until recently she knew nothing about the existence of magic. She is very close to her father to the point of feeling jealousy about other women, occasionally to the point of disturbing her classmates. She is capable of using magic-powered weapons even without the presence of ambient magic in her area. Yūna is among the group of students who secretly follow Negi and Ala Alba into the Magic World, but is separated from the group, along with Makie, after a battle between Negi and Fate Averruncus. She and Makie manage to find work, and eventually make their way to where Negi is located. She takes Negi's being a mage rather well, and as of late, the truth about her parents being Mages was revealed to her by Takane, which she also takes rather well. She also verifies this by performing a simple magic spell, one she recalls from her childhood. By Chapter 289, she has formed a pactio with Negi. In Negima!?, she is also a military buff.

Yūna's artifact is revealed in Chapter 291 as the "Iris Tulmentum" (Seven Prismatic Colored Gun), which takes the form of a pistol. The shots fired from her gun are highly powerful, and may also take different forms of ammunition. It is hinted that that gun might be the gun her mother used before she died. In the manga's final chapter, we learn that Yūna followed in her mother's footsteps and joined Megalo-Mesembria.

=== Kazumi Asakura ===
Voiced by: Ayana Sasagawa (Japanese); Monica Rial (English)
Live-action actor: Mihoko Kondo

Kazumi Asakura (朝倉 和美, Asakura Kazumi) is student number three in the class and the class reporter. She likes to get the inside scoop on everything that goes on, and is part of the Mahora Paparazzi. Her dedication to digging out the "truth" extends to knowingly working with her friend's enemies so long as she gets a "scoop." She is also very sadistic and loves to take embarrassing stories/pictures of her classmates. She discovers magic while spying on Negi, though she is persuaded to keep it a secret in exchange for a probationary contract. She is close friends with Sayo and often has her spy on people for information. She later obtains a doll for Sayo to possess, so that she can leave the school grounds. Her pactio, "Oculus Corvinus" (Raven's Eye), creates up to six small golem cameras that she is able to manipulate and send to any part of the world. It is also revealed during the story and in the character bios that she has the 4th largest breasts in class 2/3A.

=== Yue Ayase ===
Voiced by: Natsuko Kuwatani (Japanese); Brina Palencia (English)
Live-action actor: Ami Ohse

Yue Ayase (綾瀬 夕映, Ayase Yue) student number four in the class. She is intelligent, but has low grades because she is lazy. She has a marked like for strange juices, and is very close friends with Nodoka, who shares her interest in books. Yue initially fully supports Nodoka's pursuit of Negi as a love interest by helping Nodoka overcome her shyness, but realizes that she also has feelings for Negi, which she tries to suppress. Eventually she comes to terms with it as Nodoka's opinion of Yue doesn't change when this fact is revealed. Yue is also the leader of the Baka Rangers (Dummy Force), wearing a black uniform.

Yue forms a Pactio with Negi, which takes the form of the artifact, "Orbis Sensualium Pictus" ("Visible World in Pictures", probably an hommage to a school book from 1658 of the same name). Although it gives Yue only basic magical equipment, it also provides her with a complete magical encyclopedia that can instantly access any magic-related information that is updated in real time. Yue also studies magic under Negi, and quickly progresses due to her constant training and her artifact. 'While in the magical world, she suffers from a memory loss spell, and enrolls at Ariadne Magic Academy while waiting for her memory to return. During this time, she studies hard, and is soon recognized as a mage and candidate for Ariadne Knight. She has shown a strong affinity for lightning and wind spells.

After the events of the Magical world arc, she is able to muster enough courage to tell Negi she loves him. Immediately afterwards, her memory returns, and she again feels guilty for loving her best friend's crush. However, when the opportunity arises to learn of Negi's 'favorite' of the girls by forcing it out of him with magic, Yue and Nodoka stop the spell out of respect for Negi's feelings. In the latest chapter, taking place 7 years after the previous events, she runs a spiritual detective agency in Japan, gaining power through potions.

=== Ako Izumi ===
Voiced by: Kotomi Yamakawa (Japanese); Avery Rice-Williams (English)
Live-action actor: Izumi Fujimoto

Ako Izumi (和泉 亜子, Izumi Ako) is student number five in the class, and a member of the band "Dekopin Rocket." She does not consider herself anyone special and is very insecure due to a large scar on her back. After being accidentally transported to the Magic World, she is forced to become an indentured servant along with Akira and Natsumi to pay for medication she received. After Negi, disguised as "Nagi" using "Age Deceiving Candy", helps her overcome her insecurities somewhat, she develops a crush on him, believing him to be Negi's cousin. She eventually finds out that Nagi is actually Negi, which leaves her heartbroken. Over time, she gets over it and accepts "Nagi" as Negi. By Chapter 289, Negi tried to form a pactio with Ako using the aging pills to appear as "Nagi", but Ako stops him and forces a reverse aging pill in his mouth so he reverts to Negi, after which Ako chides him for putting a facade on her, and admitting that she'd rather make a pactio with "Negi" rather than with "Nagi" by now. They then do so afterwards. Her artifact is a giant syringe, which injects a drug that can boost the abilities of the one injected to amazing levels; while Ako herself calls it the ultimate support item, her classmates are disturbed by the fact that the drug apparently must be injected into the rump.

=== Akira Okochi ===
Voiced by: Azumi Yamamoto (Japanese); Jenny Phagan (Series 1), Cherami Leigh (Series 2) (English)
Live-action actor: Yuki Takikawa

Akira Okochi (大河内 アキラ, Ōkōchi Akira) is student number six in the class. She is very active in the swimming club, and the high school's swimming club also wishes to recruit her. Unlike her friends, Akira only talks when she needs to. She accidentally travels to the Magic World with Negi's group, where she ends up as an indentured slave after having to pay for medicine for Ako. In chapter 166, it is revealed she is very strong, and was able to catch Misora, even when the latter was using her artifact. After learning that Nagi is just a disguise for Negi, she attempts to hide the truth from Ako. After Ako does find out the truth, Akira consoles her. It is also implied that she is falling in love with Negi. In chapter 349 she gains an artifact that turns her into a mermaid but it is never named. It allows her jump from the surface of one body of water to another with a maximum range of 300 meters.

=== Misa Kakizaki ===
Voiced by: Shizuka Itō (Japanese); Gwendolyn Lau (English)
Live-action actor: Asumi Ohshima

Misa Kakizaki (柿崎 美砂, Kakizaki Misa) is student number seven in the class and one of its three cheerleaders along with Madoka and Sakurako. She is the one who implants the idea in her classmates heads to groom the ten-year-old Negi as a future boyfriend, many of them basing the idea off seeing Negi using age changing pills and the illusion of Negi's father. Misa also enjoys dressing up Negi or other classmates in embarrassing outfits.

=== Misora Kasuga ===
Voiced by: Ai Bandō (Japanese); Wendy Powell (English)
Live action actor: Shizuka Hasegawa

Misora Kasuga (春日 美空, Kasuga Misora) is student number nine in the class, and one of the many secret mages at the school. She is an active member of the track and field club, rivaling Asuna in the class sprint runs. She always wears a crucifix and is sometimes seen wearing a nun's habit, although she has a serious streak of mischief. She has an active pactio with Cocone, and her artifact, Joculatrix Monachans, is a pair of sneakers that allow her to run and jump with superhuman ability. She is one of the three students that had died and was buried.

=== Chachamaru Karakuri ===
Voiced by: Akeno Watanabe (Japanese); Caitlin Glass (English)
Live-action actor: Mari Saigusa

Chachamaru Karakuri (絡繰 茶々丸, Karakuri Chachamaru) is student number ten in the class. She is a two-year-old robot created by Satomi Hakase to serve Evangeline and protect her during time where the spell binding weakens her. She is initially without any real emotions, although after her confrontation with Negi she begins to exhibit emotions and develop feelings for Negi. These feelings go against her original programming, which excites Hakase. She spends most of her free time helping people and rescuing stray animals. She strongly fears the idea that she is nothing more than a robot.

Chachamaru's body is powered by an internal spring combined with magic, and it has to be wound with a key by someone with magical energy to power her. The actual winding process is apparently pleasurable and/or arousing, although too much magic can intensify the feeling to "uncomfortable" levels (usually when Negi does it, but always by accident). She is skilled in hand-to-hand combat, being equipped with weapons such as rocket fists and laser emitters, and is also proficient with various types of high-powered weaponry. She has been upgraded several times, increasing both her combat capability and her human resemblance.

Her pactio artifact, "Al-Iskandariya" (old Arabic name for Alexandria), includes a combat armor suit with a jet pack, a cat-eared battle-gear for her head, and a cat-shaped hand-held laser-alignment system/"portable control terminal"^{Ch. 281 p. 17} for an orbital bombardment from a satellite cannon known as the "Type-2130 Chao Bao Zi Satellite Support System", which is also summoned whenever and wherever the pactio card is activated. It is extremely powerful, destroying Cosmo Entelecheia's summoned beast in a single blast. All parts of the set have the Chao Bao Zi logo on it, implying that they were all Chao's inventions.^{Ch. 281 p. 14-17}

=== Madoka Kugimiya ===
Voiced by: Mami Deguchi (Japanese); Lucy Small (Series 1), Mary Morgan (onwards) (English)
Live-action actor: Madoka Ichikawa

Madoka Kugimiya (釘宮 円, Kugimiya Madoka) is student number eleven in the class and one of its three cheerleaders, along with Sakurako and Misa. She attempts to keep the other two out of trouble, but usually fails. She likes gyūdon, silver accessories, and Western music. It looks like she had an interest towards Kotaro's older form. She is not often shown in "Negima!?" but she is probably the most calm and quiet cheerleader.

=== Kū Fei ===
Voiced by: Hazuki Tanaka (first voice), Kana Asumi (onwards) (Japanese); Cynthia Cranz (English)
Live-action actor: Sari Okamoto

Kū Fei (古 菲; katakana: クー フェイ; romaji: Kū Fei; Pinyin: Gǔ Fēi) is student number twelve in the class. She is an extremely skilled Chinese martial artist, who is very energetic and joyful. She ranks near the bottom of the class, and she has problems studying due to her native language being Chinese, while she is still learning Japanese. In the original manga, she ends her sentences with "aru" (アル) to address her depiction of the language, while the English adaptation has her speak in "pidgin" English. She is a close friend of Chao Lingshen, often working at her restaurant, sparring with her, or eating her nikuman. Additionally, she becomes very close to Negi, becoming his master in martial arts. She is a previous winner of the martial arts tournament at the academy, so she constantly fights others looking to prove their own strength around campus. In the anime, Kū Fei is the yellow Baka Ranger (known as Dummy Force in English).

While Kū is extremely skilled and knowledgeable about Chinese kenpo style martial arts, Kū lacks knowledge and control of magic, but has strong ki, which rises to otherworldly levels after learning of the magical world. Mana states that "as a normal human, Kū Fei is without a doubt the strongest". Kū is a highly skilled warrior both unarmed and armed. She sometimes uses knives, swords, Chinese war hammers, and she can use the tail on her clothing in a spear-like fashion in order to restrain opponents. While in the Magic World, she was presented with the idea of forming a pactio with Negi, but initially held out due to her embarrassment and family rules; she later made a pactio with Negi after losing to him in an armwrestling match; followed with telling Negi as the man who took her lips he is indebted to become her husband. She then says she is kidding, but Kamo quickly takes into account that Negi's descendant, Chao Lingshen, is Chinese; making for an interesting situation. Her artifact is "Shintetsu Jizaikon", a virtually indestructible staff able to shift length. It is said to be the replica of the Ruyi Jingu Bang.

After the events of the Magical World trip, Kū was inspired by the courage Nodoka and Yue showed in confessing their Affection to Negi, and as a result, became the third of the students of Class 3-A to confess to Negi. She admitted that her feelings were a bit complicated, and was not overly confident in them herself, but she was able to confess nonetheless, even though she later thought it was probably too early for a confession.

=== Konoka Konoe ===
Voiced by: Ai Nonaka (Japanese); Monica Rial (English)
Live-action actor: Hiroko Matsunaga

Konoka Konoe (近衛 木乃香, Konoe Konoka) is student number thirteen in the class. She is a very cheerful and optimistic young girl, who is the daughter of chief of the Kansai magic association, the granddaughter of the school dean, and a member of the Konoe family one of the Five regent houses.^{Ch. 48 p. 7} Konoka is friendly to almost everyone and barely ever uses honorifics, even with strangers, with one exception being the powerful Jack Rakan whom she calls 'Rakan-han' due to her Kansai accent. She has a hobby of fortune telling, before and after learning about magic, though most predictions are jokes. Though she initially knows nothing of magic, she is said to hold great potential, on par with Negi, the son of the man regarded as the strongest mage. She is kept unaware in order to protect her from groups looking to exploit her, as well as the fact that her father wanted her to lead a "normal" life. However, she is eventually told the truth and chooses to begin magical studies. She lives in the same dormitory with Asuna and Negi, and she often mediates the frequent fights between them. She is very close to Setsuna, who is Konoka's protector and childhood friend, although Setsuna becomes flustered when Konoe tries to do anything with her. Later on, Konoka's relationship with Setsuna appears to grow closer to romantic rather than that of just friends; as Konoka frequently flirts with Setsuna and holds a long, passionate Pactio kiss with her.

Konoka has two Pactio agreements; she first forms one of these with Negi, which takes the form of the artifact, "Flabellum Euri" (Fans of the East), fans which are able to heal most injuries, including fatal injures, as long as it occurred within three minutes. While treating fatal injuries, her soul leaves her body, and she uses much more power than she normally has to treat the wound, though she is left drained and unable to use her artifact for a period of time. She also practices in minor healing magic to heal small wounds. Her second Pactio agreement is formed with Setsuna with Konoka as the Magistra. In the manga's final chapter, Konoka has become a Magister Magi herself and used her powers to heal everyone that turned to stone in Negi's childhood village, as well as his father. She also married in the year 2017, though the original manga did not specify whom.

=== Haruna Saotome ===
Voiced by: Sawa Ishige (Japanese); Jamie Marchi (English)
Live-action actor: Ayumi Watanabe

Haruna Saotome (早乙女 ハルナ, Saotome Haruna) student number fourteen and the local rumor-monger. She is a talented artist who draws a manga series, and a frequent companion of Yue and Nodoka. After finding out about the existence of magic, she is initially hurt that she wasn't told, though they explain it was because of her gossiping. Much to her classmates' chagrin, she is unusually perceptive about romantic entanglements, such as when she quickly identifies Natsumi's developing feelings for Kotaro. She forms a pactio with Negi, "Imperium Graphices" (Empire (or maybe Empress) of Pictures/Graphics), which takes the form of a sketchbook able to bring any drawing to life for a short time. She becomes very adept in using her artifact, able to create complex drawing in seconds that can attack or defend. She can also draw copies of herself, allowing her to draw at a much faster pace. She is also a good pilot, able to drive the goldfish-ship Paru-sama.

=== Setsuna Sakurazaki ===
Voiced by: Yuu Kobayashi (Japanese) Dana Schultes (Series 1) Cherami Leigh (Series 2) (English)
Played by: Haruki Ichikawa (1-19, 26) Aina Nishiaki (20-25)

Setsuna Sakurazaki (桜咲 刹那, Sakurazaki Setsuna) is student fifteen in the class. She is a half-demon thrown out of her tribe due to her pure-white wings, which were considered to be a bad omen as she was born into the normally black-winged bird tribe of demons. She is later taken in by Eishun Konoe. She is also a Shinmeiryuu swordsman, similar to Motoko Aoyama from Akamatsu's previous work, Love Hina. She becomes very close to his daughter, Konoka, who she promises to protect. After being unable to save Konoka from almost drowning as a young child, she distances herself personally, while still protecting her. She generally refers to Konoka as "Ojō-sama," a deferential term used for the daughter of an important figure. After joining with Negi's group to stop Chigusa's plan in Kyoto, she resumes her personal relationship with Konoka, and learns that her friends do not care that she is a half-demon. She also has a habit of wearing more masculine clothing to events, like wearing a suit instead of a dress to the ball in the magic world.

Setsuna is a kenjutsu expert of the Kyoto Shinmei-ryū (京都 神鳴流, Kyōto Shinmei-ryū; literally "God's-Cry School") of fighting. She wields a nodachi passed down to her from Eishun Konoe named "Yūnagi" (夕凪; literally "evening calm"). Evangeline has implied that Setsuna dyes her hair and wears colored contacts, and Negi himself has observed that Setsuna has a very pale complexion, which could mean that her white wings are a result of albinism.^{Ch. 107 p. 16} Besides her fighting skills, Setsuna also has some ability to manipulate magic, such as using paper dolls to create doppelgangers of other people, and creating a miniature version of herself, so that she can be in two places at once. She forms a pactio with Negi, which takes the form of the artifact "Sica Shishikushiro". It allows her to create up to sixteen independent wakizashi that can be manipulated with her mind. She later forms a pactio with Konoka, after much hesitation, that grants her a new card.^{Ch. 252 p. 14-17} The resulting artifact is named "Tsurugi no Kami: Takemikazuchi" (named after one of the patron deities of martial arts, Takemikazuchi-no-Mikoto, also a war god; the one who rode a deer into the city of Nara), a sword that grows larger and more powerful as Konoka infuses Setsuna with more of her magical power.^{Ch. 280 p. 12-14}

Initially a reserved character devoted entirely to her work protecting Konoka, at the expense of friendship and childhood experiences, Setsuna becomes much more open when she befriends Asuna and Negi, and when her secret is exposed. She then goes on to consider Asuna her best friend, and her relationship with Konoka develops into something more romantic. However she remains highly deferential, and has great difficulty using names without honorifics. She continues to consider Konoka's protection her top priority, and she constantly re-evaluates her ability and worthiness to do so, fearing that her new friendships, engagement in typical schoolgirl concerns and sense of fun have caused her to lose focus. Her battle opponents, such as Evangeline and rival Tsukuyomi have exposed these weaknesses to their advantage. Konoka has observed that Setsuna, "is one of those creatures who finds her greatest happiness in serving those who come from long lines of power" and that she, "thinks in circles and solves things by making them more complicated." ^{Vol. 37 p. 93}

In the manga's final chapter it is revealed that, like Konoka, she marries in 2017.

=== Makie Sasaki ===
Voiced by: Yui Horie (Japanese); Kate Oxley (English)
Live-action actor: Yuri Kawase

Makie Sasaki (佐々木 まき絵, Sasaki Makie) is student number sixteen in the class. She is an energetic rhythmic gymnast, who constantly competes in competitions. She is, in the second anime, the roommate of Ayaka, which often leads to conflicts over their shared obsession with Negi, although Ayaka's desire for Negi far outstrips Makie, or anyone else in the class for that matter. In Negima! Chapter 56 however she is shown to be the roommate of her best friend, Ako Izumi (room number 662). In the anime, Makie is the pink Baka Ranger (known as Dummy Force in English).

Makie has extremely honed reflexes, but she lacks mental strength, which is detrimental to her gymnastics. She has mastered control over a ribbon, which she carries with her at all times, the point where she can use it to easily grab a balloon out of midair. She is accidentally brought to the Magic World with Negi's group, where she eventually begins to learn basic magic.

Makie's possible feelings towards Negi seem to surface after Negi starts to become consumed by the Darkness magic he's trying to master. After Negi goes berserk at one point and is pacified by Evangeline, Makie quickly takes his hand and holds it firmly, which somehow has the effect of clearing the darkness from him. By Chapter 289, Makie has formed a pactio with Negi, while admitting that she likes him.

Makie's first artifact is the "Liberum Lemiscus" (Universal Ribbon).^{Ch. 291} This ribbon can extend to any length, increasing the range and ability she usually has with her "normal" ribbon. The second and third are named "Bombus Globus" (bomb ball) and "Frango Stipes" (Breaking clubs).^{Ch. 298 p. 4} Their actual abilities are unknown yet, as well as if there are more artifacts in Makie's pactio which would most likely refer to her abilities in Rhythmic gymnastics, as do the others and the image on the pactio card. If this would be the case, the tools still missing to complete the set would be rope and hoop. In the manga's final chapter, Makie becomes a middle school gym teacher.

=== Sakurako Shiina ===
Voiced by: Akane Omae (first voice), Chiaki Omigawa (onwards) (Japanese); Colleen Clinkenbeard (English)
Live-action actor: Ao Kayama

Sakurako Shiina (椎名 桜子, Shiina Sakurako) is student number seventeen in the class, and one of the three cheerleaders along with Madoka and Misa. She loves karaoke and her pet cats, Cookie and Biscuit, and is in the lacrosse club. She constantly gambles, though she wins very often. It appears she has almost supernatural luck, which makes it nearly impossible for her to be wrong when she makes a wild, uninformed guess - when they lost track of the group going to the magical world it fell upon Sakurako to guess the correct direction to take. The odds of doing so were about the same as winning the lottery. She also managed to guess correctly what was actually in the sky in the recent chapters, saying that the castle in the sky was "A castle from the magic country that suddenly appeared" in a random guess (though Evangeline was thinking how she was spot on). She is extremely positive and hyper, often being the first to respond to a question or inquiry, and mixing up words constantly.

In the first anime series, her hair was shown to be a darker shade of red. In Negima?!, it was changed to blonde.

=== Mana Tatsumiya ===
Voiced by: Miho Sakuma (Japanese); Stephanie Young (English)
Live-action actor: Juri

Mana Tatsumiya (龍宮 真名, Tatsumiya Mana) is student number eighteen in the class and the daughter of the keepers of the Tatsumiya shrine. She is referred to as "Captain Tatsumiya" by Negi. She acts as a priestess, exorcist, and mercenary, employing guns with spellbreaker bullets as her tool of exorcism. She is not particularly sociable, keeping to herself most of the time and not engaging in conversation. She carries a pactio card, which is the remnant of a contract she had with a mage who is now deceased. Mana possesses a number of mystical abilities, one of which is her Demon-Eye, which allows her to see demons and spirits. As well as being a skilled gunman and sniper, she is also skilled in close combat, using a style that utilizes coins as projectiles. It has been heavily suggested in a recent chapter that her abilities are due to her being a half-demon. Although she is somewhat friendly with Negi and the rest of her class, she is a true mercenary, taking on any assignment which will pay her sufficiently, even if it directly competes with Negi's goals, such as when she acted as a sniper for Chao Lingshen in Chao's bid to alter the future. In the end of chapter 299 she shows a form that she hasn't used in 5 years before the series. Mana has revealed that she is a half demon in her fight with Zazie's sister.

=== Chao Lingshen ===
Voiced by: Chiaki Osawa (Series 1), Megumi Takamoto (onwards) (Japanese); Trina Nishimura (English)
Live-action actor: Kaeki Watanabe

Chao Lingshen (超 鈴音 katakana: チャオリンシェン, Chao Rinshen, Pinyin: Chāo Língyīn) is student number nineteen in the class. She is known as the smartest student in the class, and one of the smartest people on campus. She spends most of her time on robotics research, Chinese medicine, life sciences, and atomic research with Satomi Hakase, though she also works at the Chao Bao Zi restaurant with Satsuki Yotsuba. Chao is also a master of various Chinese martial arts, having learned from Kū Fei. During the Mahora Festival Arc, she is revealed to be a descendant of Negi from the future who has traveled back in time to expose the existence of magic to the world, thus serving as the arc's primary antagonist. After Negi and his comrades successfully stop her, she accepts her defeat and returns to her own time, but not before revealing a family tree which contains who Negi would eventually be with; this however was quickly destroyed without anyone seeing its contents. It is suggested that the Family Tree may have been a fake since no one saw if anything was written in it before it was destroyed (thanks to Asuna), though it was still enough to incapacitate Class 2/3-A in 57 seconds. She makes another appearance near the end of the manga series, where Asuna meets her in the future after being sealed for 100 years. She and Evangeline eventually help take her back to her present time to rejoin Negi and her friends.

=== Kaede Nagase ===
Voiced by: Ryoko Shiraishi (Japanese); Clarine Harp (English)
Live-action actor: Yuna Arai

Kaede Nagase (長瀬 楓, Nagase Kaede) is student number twenty in the class and a member of the Koga ninja clan. She has an easy-going attitude and is almost always seen with her eyes almost closed, a trait shared with Mitsune "Kitsune" Konno of Akamatsu's previous work, Love Hina. Kotaro admires her strength very much since she's the first girl who has ever defeated him. She refers to herself as "sessha" and she frequently ends her sentences with "de gozaru", an archaic verb form historically used by samurai. She trains in the mountains, displaying a wide range of cinematic ninja abilities such as the ability to create clones. After learning about the existence of magic, she helps Negi in various situations, including traveling to the Magic World in search of his father. She is close to Kotaro and often trains with him. She is one of the three students that had died and was buried.

=== Chizuru Naba ===
Voiced by: Misa Kobayashi (Japanese); Amy Rosenthal (English)
Live-action actor: Ai Tanimoto

Chizuru Naba (那波 千鶴, Naba Chizuru) is student number twenty-one in the class. She is a kind person to everyone, one trait among many others she shares with Mutsumi Otohime from Love Hina, which is another of Ken Akamatsu's works. She volunteers at the daycare center in Mahora City and has exceptional domestic skills. According to notes taken down by Kazumi of Class 2-A/3-A, Chizuru is the girl with the biggest breasts of all the class. After Kotaro comes to the school for Negi, she forces him to live in their dorm under the identity of Natsumi's younger brother, although he lives in great fear of her home remedies, which invariably consist of spring onion suppositories. She forms a Pactio with Negi very late in the story and gains an artifact.^{Ch. 340 p.17} It is a scepter in the form of a spring onion that cures every ailment or status effect, but in return forces a person to obey any of Chizuru's commands when stabbed by it.^{Ch. 348 p. 10} In chapter 340 it is revealed that her family runs a conglomerate.^{Ch. 340} In the manga's final chapter, Chizuru becomes a nursery day care worker and dotes on Fuka's and Fumika's daughters.

=== Fuka Narutaki ===
Voiced by: Kimiko Koyama (Japanese); Alison Viktorin, Cherami Leigh (Series 2, episodes 23-26) (English)
Live-action actor: Saya Kataoka

Fuka Narutaki (鳴滝 風香, Narutaki Fūka) is student number twenty-two in the class and the elder of the Narutaki twins. She constantly causes trouble, often using ninjutsu "skills" taught to her by Kaede to sneak around or run away. Her pactio in Negima! allows for the creation of unlimited cloning.

=== Fumika Narutaki ===
Voiced by: Mari Kanou (Japanese); Alison Viktorin, Cherami Leigh (Series 2, episodes 23-26) (English)
Live-action actor: Manaka Yamamoto

Fumika Narutaki (鳴滝 史伽, Narutaki Fumika) is student number twenty-three in the class and the younger of the Narutaki twins. She is the opposite of her sister, often telling her that her ideas are bad.

=== Satomi Hakase ===
Voiced by: Mai Kadowaki (Japanese); Jayme Westman (Series 1), Carrie Savage (Spring and Summer Specials, Series 2) (English)
Live-action actor: Ririko Uchida

Satomi Hakase (葉加瀬 聡美, Hakase Satomi) is student number twenty-four in the class, and an expert in robotics. She is very close to Chao, actively taking part in the plan to reveal magic to the world, and utilizing Chao's magic and technology from the future, although she defers to Chao in judging whether they are doing the right thing. Her great intelligence, obsession in her work, and lack of common sense lead her classmates to refer to both her and Chao as mad scientists. She is the creator of Chachamaru, and essentially acts like her mother. She constantly upgrades her and takes special interest in the ways she develops, such as developing feelings for Negi. Her last name, "hakase", is a homophone of 博士, which means "doctor" (i.e., a person who has obtained a doctorate). Often, she is referred to as Hakase-Hakase (or just "Hakase", but with the alternate meaning). The English manga translates this as "Professor Hakase" or "Professor"; even the meaning "Professor-Professor" would be correct, depending on which version of the pun is in use.

=== Chisame Hasegawa ===
Voiced by: Yumi Shimura (Japanese); Caitlin Glass (English)
Live-action actor: Natsuko Aso

Chisame Hasegawa (長谷川 千雨, Hasegawa Chisame) is student number twenty-five in the class. She is grumpy, unsocial, and views her classmates as idiots and freaks, citing that it is obvious that Chachamaru and Mana don't belong in the school and that 10-year-old Negi teaching the class does not make any sense. However, as much as Chisame avoids any and all attention in the real world, in the privacy of her own room, she takes on the role of Chiu (ちう), a famous Net Idol and Model, devoted to cosplay. Although she is, fitting with her character, rather disturbed by the idea of other students being openly attracted to and/or in love with 10-year-old Negi, she eventually becomes very close with Negi as he convinces her to interact with the real world. After finding out about the existence of magic, she reluctantly becomes part of Negi's group.

Chisame is extremely skilled with computers, and she is able to hack into large databases with minimal effort. After forming a pactio with Negi, she gains the artifact, "Sceptrum Virtuale" (Virtual Scepter), a heart-topped staff that allows her to actually enter cyberspace as a physical realm, upon which she can internally hack into systems. She can allow others to enter with her while their bodies stay in the real world. She is assisted by virtual "spirits", Kincha, Hanpe, Konnya, Chikuwafu, Negi, Daiko, and Shirataki, who can communicate with her while she is nearby an electronic device. They can watch out for any viral attacks, and manipulate data, which allows her to increase the ranking of her site. However, her Pactio ability has the drawback of being near-useless when not connected to the internet, although her spirits can also navigate the magic worlds systems which might be electrically powered. Her spirits disappear when her laptop's batteries are exhausted. Her Pactio has an additional ability which she uses more often, which allows her to transform into various Net-idol cosplay outfits. During the "Magical World" arc she takes Asuna's place as Negi's "Guardian" temporarily. In the manga's final chapter, Chisame becomes a recluse while assisting with the ISSDA (International Solar System Development Agency). Later is revealed in UQ Holder! that Chisame was the girl Negi chose in the end, marrying her some years after he rescued his father from the Mage of the Beginning.

=== Evangeline A.K. McDowell ===
Voiced by: Yuki Matsuoka (Japanese); Laura Bailey (English)
Live-action actor: Sakina Kuwae, Hitomi Miwa (adult)

Evangeline Athanasia Katherine (Kitty) McDowell (エヴァンジェリン・アタナシア・キティ・マクダウェル, Evanjerin Atanashia Kiti Makudaweru), listed as Evangeline A.K. McDowell (エヴァンジェリン・マクダウェル, Evanjerin Makudaweru), and usually called by her classmates as Evachan, is student number twenty-six in the class. She is a British "high daylight walker" pure-blooded-vampire (真祖, Shinso; true Ancestor) who was turned at the age of ten during the Hundred Years' War. After many years of struggle, hiding, and hardship, she eventually became known as one of the most feared mages in both worlds. After coming into contact with Nagi Springfield, she starts following him around out of love until he seals her within the Mahora Academy grounds, telling her to "live in the light for a change" and promising to free her upon graduation. He disappears soon after, which means that she cannot be freed without blood from his bloodline, which makes her target Negi.

Evangeline attempts to obtain Negi's blood and free herself from the curse, but as she cannot regularly access her power, she is eventually defeated. She takes an interest in Negi afterward, and decides to not pursue him any longer. She takes him as a student sometime later, helping him improve his combat and magical abilities. She occasionally takes his blood as payment, and they train within a special miniaturized world, which she refers to as her "resort," which is located within a glass sphere where a day inside the sphere is only an hour. She also trains Asuna, Setsuna, and several other members of Negi's group. During regular school activities, she is in the tea ceremony club out of enjoyment, and she often visits Konoemon Konoe, the School Dean, and occasionally Albireo Imma.

Evangeline's power is notorious in the Magic World, which leads to nicknames like "Advent of Evil", "Apostle of Calamity", "Gospel of Darkness", "Dark Evangel", "Puppet/Doll Master", "Maga Nosferatu", "The Girl Queen of Darkness", "The Visitation of Woes", and "The Disciple of Dark Tones." As a dark mage, Evangeline specializes in ice-based spells and dark magic, and is shown to be incredibly powerful once in her full capacities. She created the style "Magia Erebea", which absorbs magic into the users body; bonding it to the user's soul. Her abilities allow her to fly and give her extremely fast regeneration, even while under the curse; though Chachamaru is generally used to fight in her stead. She is also a master of puppetry, and she is able to control hundreds of marionettes at once, or use the ability on her opponents. She currently only uses one sentient doll, Chachazero (チャチャゼロ), a very rude and violent being, though she cannot move without a large concentration of magic. In her resort, she makes use of several other sentient dolls who can move due to the high concentration of magic within her resort.

Chachamaru is a servant to her. She refers to Evangeline as "master" and does anything she orders. While Chachazero is a puppet, Chachamaru is a robot, and requires no power from Evangeline. Instead, she plugs herself in.

=== Nodoka Miyazaki ===
Voiced by: Mamiko Noto (Japanese); Leah Clark (English)
Live-action actor: Miyu Wagawa

Nodoka Miyazaki (宮崎 のどか, Miyazaki Nodoka) is student number twenty seven in the class at Mahora Academy. She is a shy bookworm, who spends most of her time in the library or the bookstore. She is among the top ranking students in the school, and she possesses knowledge of a wide variety of topics from her constant reading. She often uses her hair to cover her eyes completely, but when brought out of her shy shell, gains confidence, and shows one of her eyes. Although Negi is several years younger than her, she still has a crush on him because she believes he carries the maturity of an adult. She is also very close to Yue, and after learning of Yue's feelings for Negi and her distress of having the same crush as her friend, Nodoka comforts her, although she still has normal jealousy on occasion.

Nodoka is the second person to hold a pactio with Negi, which takes the form of the artifact, "Diarium Ejus" (His Diary, probably meant as "God's Diary" or "The Opponent's Diary), a diary that shows the inner thoughts and feelings of any person whose name she calls using writing and illustrations. The book can levitate and automatically turn its pages, and she can edit or delete anything in it. The thoughts appear in the way Nodoka would write them and draw them, so they are always polite and simplistic. Nodoka finds this book she carries quite useful for finding out what Negi thinks of her. However, Nodoka must know the name of the person she wants to read the mind of or it will not work; if she does not call a name, it reads her own thoughts, which often embarrass her due to her (apparently unconscious) sexually explicit thoughts. She later gains the ability to split the book into multiple smaller diaries, which allows her to read multiple minds at once.

During her stay in the magic world with a group of treasure hunters, she gains the (non-Pactio) artifacts "Comptina Daemonia" (Demonic Nursery Rhyme), which allows her to instantly know the true name of anyone who she asks, and "Auris Recitans" (the Reading into your Ear), which allows her to hear the thoughts written through an earpiece by placing clips in her artifact. Her experience of treasure hunting while being separated from the main group greatly develops Nodoka's resolve and initiative; she goes on to take full advantage of her artifact to make split-second decisions that can get her party out of scrapes. Her evolution is such that after witnessing the apparent death of one of her new friends, she instantaneously reacts, stealing the powerful Grand Master Key and escaping with it single-handedly. While she remains humble and quiet outside of battle, this 'new' Nodoka frequently surprises her friends with her drive and ability.

=== Natsumi Murakami ===
Voiced by: Mai Aizawa (Japanese); Majken Kunishima (English)
Live-action actor: Eri Mukunoki

Natsumi Murakami (村上 夏美, Murakami Natsumi) is the twenty-eighth student in the class. She is a shy girl, who is an actress in the drama club. She feels that her body is underdeveloped, so she is constantly depressed and jealous of her more developed classmates. She bonds with Kotaro after he arrives at the school; and begins to develop slight jealousy of his interactions with other girls. She is accidentally brought to the Magic World, where she is forced to become an indentured servant. After being saved, Haruna convinces her to form a pactio with Kotaro, rather than Negi. Although she is very embarrassed by the idea of kissing Kotaro to form the contract (due to the romantic implications and the age difference between herself and 10-year-old Kotaro), she is convinced due to Kotaro's speech in which he states that he thinks of Natsumi and friends as the closest things to family he has and that he loves her. She succeeds in the formation of the Pactio and then suddenly tells Kotaro that she has feelings for him; she immediately regrets this and runs off. Her Pactio artifact is "Adjutor Solitarius" (Lonely Helper), a mask that has the ability to suppress her presence and the presence of anyone she is holding hands with when held up to her face. In the epilogue, it is revealed that she marries Kotaro after they grow up.

=== Ayaka Yukihiro ===
Voiced by: Junko Minagawa (Japanese); Laura Bailey (English)
Live-action actor: Rei Ohtsuka, Haruka Fukuhara (young)

Ayaka Yukihiro (雪広 あやか, Yukihiro Ayaka) is student number twenty-nine in the class. She comes from a wealthy family, and is the class representative. As such, she is frequently referred to by other classmates as "Iincho," (Japanese: 'class representative') She is one of the top ranking students in the school, and she is well trained in martial arts. She has a heated rivalry with Asuna that often causes conflict between the two, although the rivalry is in truth a cover for a caring friendship. She is obsessed with Negi, claiming that he needs a mother figure, and is the most vocal in her class in her open desire to "claim" him. However, most of her classmates feel that it is an unhealthy obsession, as Negi is only 10 years old, but she seems to have no qualms at all about his age. She later reveals that she would have had a younger brother, had he not died during childbirth, and she greatly wishes for that sort of connection, although her obsession with Negi still appears to be romantically based. Her Pactio gives her the ability to meet anyone, no matter how important without prior permission. Fate points out that this would allow the user to find and assassinate anyone without worry of being stopped on the way there.

=== Satsuki Yotsuba ===
Voiced by: Naomi Inoue (Japanese); Monica Rial (English)
Live-action actor: Mei Shimizu

Satsuki Yotsuba (四葉 五月, Yotsuba Satsuki) is student number thirty in the class, and an aspiring chef. She is part of the school's cooking club, and cooks at a streetcar restaurant. Satsuki's dream is to have her own restaurant, as she likes making people happy through her food. Most other students state that they admire her for following her dream; she even draws rare praise from Evangeline, who thinks nearly everyone else in 3A lacks direction. Satsuki has a unique way of speaking that is shown in the manga by depicting her words without a speech bubble; she displays great wisdom for her age, and an image of a koala tends to be drawn beside her when she is making a speech. Although not directly linked or involved in the various incidents that take place throughout the manga, she seems passively aware of the magical students and events that take place in throughout the school and unsurprised at the feats of magic that occur in her presence. She is one of the three students that had died and was buried.

=== Zazie Rainyday ===
Voiced by: Yuka Inokuchi (Japanese); Carrie Savage (English)
Live-action actor: Taeka Hatazawa

Zazie Rainyday (ザジ・レイニーデイ, Zaji Reinīdei) is student thirty-one in the class. She rarely speaks, and doesn't associate with anyone outside of the school's acrobatic club. She often spends time juggling and hanging around with a group of masked monster-like black blobs she simply refers to as "friends". In the Mahora Festival Arc, it was the first time she spoke to anyone with more words than one. Her lack of character development and speaking lines is occasionally the subject of in-character jokes; when Ayaka claims to be speaking to Zazie on the phone (although in truth all that Zazie said was "Bye"), the other students express disbelief that she is even talking. Recently, she had appeared before Negi and his group at the lower entrance of the Gravekeeper's Palace; however, that was revealed to be in fact her older sister. Zazie's sister used her pactio to put Negi and the people of his party who were not satisfied with their life into a copy of Cosmo Entelecheia, to show its effect and try to dissuade Negi from trying to stop Fate. Zazie herself aided Negi while he was in Cosmo Entelecheia, bringing more questions as to her involvement with Fate, and what her powers are.^{Ch. 296} Her Negima! pactio is a set of magical slicing cards. She speaks much more often in Negima!?, and makes very bad puns.

== Mahora Academy characters ==
=== Teachers ===
==== Takamichi T. Takahata ====
Voiced by: Norihiro Inoue (Japanese); Mark Stoddard (English)
Live-action actor: Hiroshi

Takamichi T. Takahata (高畑・T・タカミチ, Takahata T. Takamichi) is the teacher Negi replaces at Mahora, though he takes up a position as a guidance counselor. He was a member of Ala Rubra, and though he was only a child at the time, he fought actively during the war. Although he is greatly respected (and quite famous) in the magic community, he is a magic school dropout due to the fact that he cannot perform incantations. Instead, he uses "kankahō", a fighting style that combines eastern Ki, western magic, and a bare-fist version of iaidō, "iaiken". Asuna is obsessed with him, though he hides the truth from her, and that he erased her memories of the Magic World. He comments that he has no right to be loved for an unknown reason. His fighting style and personal appearance/habits, including cigarette smoking, are based on Gateau von Vandenberg, another Ala Rubra member who was his master. In Negima!?, he is the assistant of Negi, as well as being an avid fan of ramen.

==== Shizuna Minamoto ====
Voiced by: Kikuko Inoue (Japanese); Colleen Clinkenbeard (English)
Live-action actor: Nao Oikawa

Shizuna Minamoto (源 しずな, Minamoto Shizuna) is Negi's advisor at Mahora Academy. She primarily attempts to be a motherly figure while Negi adjusts to the school, slowly leading him into the different aspects of his job. She and Takahata are rumored to have been dating, although this is never confirmed.

==== Konoemon Konoe ====
Voiced by: Mahito Tsujimura (Japanese); Randy Tallman (Series 1), R Bruce Elliott (Series 2) (English)
Live-action actor: Gajiro Sato

Konoemon Konoe (近衛 近右衛門, Konoe Konoemon) is the school dean and Konoka Konoe's grandfather. He is also the chief of the Kantō Magic Association. Despite Konoka being unwilling, he constantly arranges miai ("wedding interviews" or dates pre-arranged by family members), so that she can choose a future fiancé. He humorously offers one of these to Negi upon their first meeting. It was hinted at the end of episode 19 that he likely had great feelings for Sayo Aisaka (student number 1 in class 2/3-A) when she was alive.

=== Other teachers ===
Professor Akashi is the father of Yuna Akashi. He researches magical phenomenon, such as the connection between Fate and Wilhelm. His daughter is unaware of magic, so he keeps porn magazines in his office to distract his daughter from his magic related research papers. As of late, his being a Mage was revealed to Yūna, and furthermore, his late wife, Yūko, was revealed to be not just a mage herself, but a government agent sent to Megalomesembira in an operation related to the current situation, which was also where and how she died.

Tōko Kuzunoha (葛葉 刀子, Kuzunoha Tōko) is the woman in charge of the Mahora mage organization's operations division, ranking second only to the Headmaster. She is a Shinmeiryuu swordswoman, who acts as Setsuna's master.

Kataragi is a mage employed by Mahora Academy. He's most distinguished by his deep black goatee, sunglasses and black suit. Also referred to as Sunglasses Beard Sensei by the students of the school. Kataragi specializes in Western wind magic, severing techniques, long range and unincanted spells.

Gandolfini (ガンドルフィーニ) is a dark-skinned mage, who uses both a handgun and knife in combat.

Sister Shakti (シスター シャークティ), is a mage teacher, who heads the Mahora nun patrol squad. She seems particularly skilled in combat and uses floating crosses in battle. Both Misora and Cocone are under her guidance at the church on Mahora's campus. She is voiced by Marina Inoue in the Drama CD.

=== Students ===
==== Kotaro Inugami ====
Voiced by: Marina Inoue

Kotaro Inugami (犬上 小太郎, Inugami Kotarō) is a ten-year-old humanoid with pointed ears and furry tail. He can perform a partial dog transformation which gives him more canine aspects similar to modern movie representations of a werewolf. He forms a strong rivalry and friendship with Negi after facing him as an opponent in Kyoto while serving as a mercenary. He later joins the school where Negi teaches, living with Chizuru, Natsumi, and Ayaka under the guise of Natsumi's brother. He also has a strong dislike of practitioners of Western-style magic, with Negi being one of the few exceptions. Kotaro is an expert in physical combat and charms, and has the power to summon dog spirits, but prefers to fight hand to hand using a self-taught ninja style. He is also capable of temporarily transforming himself into a black puppy. He trains with Kaede in ninjutsu in order to strengthen himself enough to be a help to Negi's future battles. Although he holds no Pactio with Negi, Kotaro often acts as a partner of Negi in combat, partnering with him in a tournament in the Magical World in order to gain money to free their friends from indentured servitude. In the finals, he transforms into a giant demonic black dog. Instead of forming a Pactio contract with Negi, Kotaro acts as the Magister in a contract with Natsumi, who is in love with him, although as a 10-year-old, he fails to comprehend the meaning behind Natsumi's interrogation of his thoughts towards other girls. He later marries Natsumi during the epilogue of the final chapter of the manga.

==== Takane D. Goodman ====
Voiced by: Naomi Inoue (Drama CD)

Takane D. Goodman (高音・Ｄ・グッドマン) is a high-school student and secret mage. Her magical affinity is shadows, and she can summon and direct shadow warriors, as well as create highly elaborate shadow armor, which mimics clothes. When she is defeated and her magic depleted this causes her armor-clothes to disappear, leaving her naked. This tends to cause her trauma within the story, as it generally happens in front of a group of people. It looks like she has a crush on Negi after defeated by him in mahora martial arts tournament based on her behavior around him. This was confirmed at the end of the manga when she challenged him to a fight and demanded that he must go out with her if she wins. After she loses against Negi without being stripped she asks him why he didn't strip her and asks if it was out of pity or it was because she no longer attractive to him and chases him yelling at him if he was going to undress her or go out with her before their "marriage". In the final chapter she and Mei are seen working with Akashi Yuna as agents of Megalo-Mesembria.

==== Mei Sakura ====
Voiced by: Tomoko Nakamura

Mei Sakura (佐倉 愛衣, Sakura Mei) is another student-mage. She constantly travels with Takane and shares her penchant for losing her clothing in battle. Her artifact is a broomstick and she has an elemental magic affinity for fire. After losing to Kotaro he saves her from drowning and she gains a great admiration for him. It is hinted that she has a crush for him.

==== Cocone Fatima Rosa ====
Cocone Fatima Rosa (ココネ・ファティマ・ロザ, Kokone Fatima Roza) is a young dark-skinned ninja-nun. She was born in the magical world and almost always tags along with Misora Kasuga due to the fact that Misora is her Ministra Magi. She specializes in telepathy, and is much better at drawing than Misora. Overall, she tends to show a little more common sense than Misora, but rarely speaks, and usually goes along with whatever Misora does, even if she gets into trouble right along with her. She is very attached to Misora, silently hugging the older girl's neck when the latter talked about how much she wished to stop her training, leading Misora to add in that she would never leave Cocone.

==== Megumi Natsume ====
Megumi Natsume (夏目萌, Natsume Megumi), alias Nutmeg (ナツメグ, natsumegu) is a Dark-haired, glasses-wearing girl who is a magic student from the Mahora Elementary School. Nutmeg carries a short staff and primarily uses water magic, and is part of a Mahou Shojo team with Mei and Takane. She made her first major appearance with Takane and Mei as they tried to capture Asuna and Negi's other partners in the future using a water spell, but was defeated by Negi's partners.

== Welsh characters ==
=== Nekane Springfield ===
Voiced by: Masami Suzuki (Series 1), Miyuki Sawashiro (Season 2) (Japanese); Gwendolyn Lau (English)

Nekane is Negi's cousin whom Negi addresses as "oneechan," a more casual Japanese term for "older sister." Nekane took on a maternal role during Negi's childhood, even sharing a bed with him. Asuna bears some physical resemblance to Nekane, which is why Negi sometimes sleeps beside her, much to her (Asuna's) dismay.

Six years ago, when demons attacked the village where she and Negi used to live in, she was almost turned to stone while trying to protect Negi from a petrification spell, but was saved by the Thousand Master just in time. Her legs were turned to stone and broke off. A later shot of her in Volume 10 reveals that her legs have been restored.

In Negima!?, Nekane does gain a greater role in the second anime. As the Star Crystal crisis slowly grows, Nekane chooses to assist her brother by disguising as the "Black Rose Baron", an enigmatic character initially seen not working for either Negi or for the one controlling the crystal. Eventually, Nekane appears as herself to assist Negi and his class in the running of the day-to-day activities, but Negi eventually discovers her secret. However, he is forced to keep Nekane's other identity a secret to protect her and his students.

=== Albert Chamomile ===
Voiced by: Masashi Yabe (Japanese); Chris Cason (English)

Albert Chamomile (カモミール・アルベール, Kamomīru Arubēru; Chamomile Albert), or Chamo (カモ, Kamo) is a talking, perverted, chain-smoking and lingerie stealing ermine. He has been close to Negi ever since he saved Chamo from a trap. Chamo often acts as Negi's trusty advisor in most things, though there are times his judgement is lacking. He is skillful at analyzing dangerous situations and coming up with countermeasures when most of the others are in a state of panic, though they are not always fully thought out. His level of magic is not as great as most of the mages shown in the series, though he has shown some considerable spell casting, chief among them is drawing up magic circles, which is essential for creating Pactios, and casting anti-telepathy spells. He also has the disturbing hobby of keeping track of the girls' feelings for Negi, often to the chagrin of all involved. In the live-action adaptation of the franchise, Chamo is depicted as an animated figure locked in a patch sewn on Negi's suit. In Negima?!, he seems to take over Negi's role as Asuna's punching bag as whenever he said something offensive about her, she will grab his head with him yelling out "Animal abuse" in return.

=== Anya ===
Voiced by: Ryō Hirohashi (Series 1), Chiwa Saito (Series 2) (Japanese); Kate Bristol (Series 1), Brittney Karbowski (Series 2) (English)

Anastasia "Anya" Yurievna Cocolova (アンナ•ユリエウナ•ココロウァ) is a childhood friend of Negi and a former schoolmate. Upon graduating, she is sent to work as a fortuneteller in London. She has a magically affinity to fire spells. She eventually goes to Japan to make Negi return to England, though she is shocked to learn that he has already made seven different contracts and has far surpassed her in magic. She later goes to the Magic World with the group, though she is captured by Fate after they are separated. She appears to have feelings for Negi.

Negima!? features her stealing a dangerous artifact known as the "Star Crystal", which quickly consumes her due to her jealousy of Negi. She is eventually saved by Negi and his class, but as punishment, she joins Negi's class as student number 32 in Negima!? Neo.

== Ala Rubra (Crimson Wing) ==
=== Nagi Springfield ===
Voiced by: Takehito Koyasu (Series 1, Granblue Fantasy), Miyuki Sawashiro (Series 2) (Japanese); Troy Baker (Series 1), J. Michael Tatum (Series 2) (English)
Live-action actor: Hassei Takano

Nagi Springfield (ナギ・スプリングフィールド, Nagi Supuringufīrudo) is Negi's father and a legendary mage known as "The Thousand Master." He led the group "Crimson Wing" during the Great War, and he and his companions are held as saviors. After the war, he traveled for ten years, becoming even more famous for his heroic deeds before suddenly disappearing in Istanbul the year of Negi's birth. His fate is unknown, but he is known to be alive, as his pactios are still in effect, and Negi believes that Nagi saved him from the demons attacking his home village. It has since been revealed that, like Zecht before him, he has become possessed by the Mage of the Beginning. Nagi is shown to be straight forward, childlike, laid back, and disrespectful. He hates respectful titles, and would rather be called by his name.

In the anime, it is revealed that Nagi was protecting young Asuna from demon attacks in Germany nine years ago when he disappeared. Nagi detects a flying demon approaching, but failed to cast a protective spell as Asuna cancels out all nearby magic. As the demon picks Nagi up on the tip of its massive sword, away from Asuna, Nagi casts a spell that draws himself and the demon into a portal to an unknown place. He swears to Asuna this state will be temporary, but it is strongly implied that Nagi does not make it back to Asuna within the following nine years as Negi and Class 2-A are the ones who eventually save Asuna from the demons.

Rumors state that he is the master of one thousand spells, though he is actually a dropout who has to use notes to properly cast the few spells that he knows. He has a strong affinity for lightning, having mastered the element's strongest spells. Nagi is so strong, in both magical and physical combat, that he does not even need any partners to help him. His fighting style was that of a Combat Mage, using both speedy magic casting and hand-to-hand combat in tandem. He has made pactios with Jack Rakan and Albeiro Imma. He also had Negi with Arika, the former queen of Ostia, currently known as the Queen of Calamity.

In the end of the series, it is revealed that Nagi was possessed by the spirit of the Mage of the Beginning, but was somehow saved by Negi and Ala Rubra, and is also revealed in UQ Holder! that he married Evangeline in the original timeline, while in the alternate timeline where the events of UQ Holder! is set, he was killed by Negi, who became the new vessel for the Mage of the Beginning instead.

=== Jack Rakan ===
Voiced by: Rikiya Koyama

Jack Rakan (ジャック・ラカン, Jakku Rakan), also known as "Rakan of the Thousand Blades", is the large, dark-skinned member of Nagi's group. He is known as a legendary fighter, and one of the very few people able to fight evenly with Nagi. He built up his skills from years of life and death battles in coliseums, hunting beasts, and acting as a mercenary. He eventually meets Nagi after being hired to kill him, acknowledges his strength, and joins his group. He has a very greedy and laid back personality, rarely doing anything for free or getting willingly involved in disputes. He is rarely serious in battle, often utilizing flashy techniques just for fun. He has been Negi's master and is joining Negi's group. In the latest chapters, it seems that Rakan is in trouble. He is fighting Fate Averruncus and he manages to fight and defeat Fate, before Fate uses a large key - referred to as the "Code of the Lifemaker" - to alter reality so that the battle did not occur and he was unhurt. He is later erased by this key.

Rakan's Pactio item, "Ho Heroes Meta Chilion Prosopon" (The Hero with a Thousand Faces), can create numerous bladed weapons that Rakan can instantly change upon a whim. He can create a building-sized sword, numerous small blades, and he can also charge energy into the weapons. His pactio also allowed him to create artificial limbs and a giant piledriver arm when his limbs were erased by Fate. He also utilizes energy attacks, and though he knows spell incantations, he does not use them in battle. He is a skilled hand-to-hand fighter, able to react to lightning fast movements with years of experience. Jack's actual age is unknown.

=== Eishun Konoe ===
Voiced by: Masaki Terasoma (Series 1), Toshiyuki Morikawa (Drama CD) (Japanese); Chuck Huber (English)

Eishun Konoe (近衛 詠春, Konoe Eishun) is Konoka's father, the chief of the Kansai Magic Association, and a former member of Ala Rubra. In order to defuse a feud between the two associations, Konoemon Konoe set up an arranged marriage between Eishun with his daughter. Eishun is a Shinmei-ryū swordsmaster. He does not initially tell his daughter about magic, sending her to Mahora Academy under the care of his father-in-law.

=== Albireo Imma ===
Voiced by: Daisuke Ono

Albireo Imma (アルビレオ・イマ, Arubireo Ima), is one of Nagi's former companions. He is registered as a librarian in the Mahora Library Island. Unable to leave the area for unknown reasons, he is only able to leave using replicas fueled by the world tree's magic. He admits to Eva that he spent at least ten years in rehabilitation. During the Mahorafest arc he takes the pseudonym "Ku:nel Sanders", an allusion to Colonel Sanders, stated in an omake that this is probably just because he enjoys chicken from KFC. Albireo would not respond to a person, in fact he would completely ignore them, if they did not call him "Colonel Sanders". Albireo takes delight in tormenting and playing mindgames with Eva. He's also a cunning and shrewd man, and is considered as one of the two natural enemies which Evangeline has, the other one being Nagi himself. He is voiced by Daisuke Ono.

Albireo has displayed high proficiency with both gravity and healing magic in addition to being a skilled unarmed combatant. During the Great War he defeated Dynamis during the final battle. His Pactio item is a series of books, with an accompanying bookmark, that can be used to transform into a specific person, using all their skills and abilities. His present Pactio is with Nagi, but he has had 12 other contracts with other mages in the past, all of whom are dead. The fact that his pactio with Nagi remains active serves as proof that Nagi is still alive. Albireo's actual age is unknown.

=== Gateau Kagura von Vandenburg ===
Voiced by: Keiji Fujiwara (Drama CD)

Gateau Kagura von Vandenburg (ガトウ・カグラ・ヴァンデンバーグ, Gatō Kagura fon Vandenbāgu) is one of Nagi's companions. Before he became a member of Ala Rubra he worked in the military for Megalomesembria. He is Takamichi's master and taught him, and Asuna, the magical combat form called "Magic Ki Fusion" or "Kanka", that combines both Eastern chi and Western magic. He dies before the start of the series, with his dying wish to have Asuna's memories of him erased.

=== Filius Zect ===
Voiced by: Jun Fukuyama (Drama CD)

Filius Zect is a calm, collected, and skilled warrior excelling in unarmed combat and counter magic. Nagi refers to him as "master" despite looking older and being more powerful. Filius fought alongside Nagi against the Mage of the Beginning and died after the battle, vanishing into dust after stating that "A war hero cannot shape the future," that "humanity is beyond saving" and finally that "his 2600 years of despair [ended now]." However, he has appeared again roughly 8 years after the battle as the Mage of Beginning. It is possible that, before he was defeated, the Mage of Beginning may have transported his soul into Zect, though other possibilities exist.

== Magical World characters ==
=== Arika Anarchia Entheofushia ===
Voiced by: Megumi Hayashibara (Drama CD)

Arika Anarchia Entheofushia the princess of the Vespertatia royal family in the nation of Ostia, and Negi's mother. She comes into contact with Ala Rubra during the struggle between the empire and the confederation after failing to act as an arbitrator. They protect her from Cosmo Entelecheia, though she is eventually captured. After the destruction of Ostia Arika, charged with its destruction, was tried in an international court, and said to have been executed eighteen years before the series. However, Nagi rescued her on the day of her execution and took her back to the old world. Despite being publicly known as the "Queen of Calamity" destroyer of her own country, the citizens of Ostia have fond memories of her and declare that she did her best to save the country. It is hinted that she is a sister to Asuna Kagurazaka, who is a descendant of the Ostian royal family.

=== Theodora ===
Theodora, the third princess of the Hellas Empire is a tomboyish woman, who was saved by Ala Rubra during the war. She is close to Jack Rakan, though he treats her like a child and it is assumed that she has feelings for him. She is thirty years old, though that is only the equivalent of ten human years in her race. She makes a pactio with Negi in order to help him have a better chance of beating Rakan.

=== Tosaka ===
Tosaka is a leading member of the arena team "Grancius Fortes". He initially is portrayed as a thug who abuses the slaves, although he is a former slave himself. After Negi and Kotaro join his team, Tosaka slowly gains respect for them, while also resenting the fact that they are so easily gaining the money to free their friends from slavery, while it took him over eighteen years. He attempts to blackmail Negi into being his slave, but after Ako prepares to trade away the little freedom she has left for the evidence, he decides to drop it. It is later hinted that Tosaka did this because he has a crush on Ako. He is also erased by the Cosmo Entelecheia.

=== Emily Sevensheep ===
Voiced by: Ayana Taketatsu

Emily Sevensheep is a beastgirl who attends the magical academy in the city-state of Ariadne as a magical knight in training. She is the class president of Class 3-C and one of the most promising cadets. She is a fan of Nagi Springfield, and wishes to see Negi, posing as Nagi in battle. She is initially very cruel towards Yue and Collet Farandole, but she becomes close to them during a competition. During their time in Ostia she gains more respect (and possibly more intimate feelings) for Yue, and is later erased protecting Yue.

=== Beatrix Monroe ===
Voiced by: Kana Hanazawa

Beatrix is Emily's close childhood friend and her second. She is also a magical knight of Ariadne. She is very loyal to Emily, calling her Ojou-sama, but unlike Emily she is a human. Beatrix is a calm person who rarely sticks out. She got the same role as Setsuna to Konoka with Emily. While Emliy is a Nagi Springfield fan, Beatrix is secretly a Jack Rakan fan. Yue and Beatrix goes into a rage after Emily is erased. She is later turned to stone by Fate Averruncus petrification magic after protecting Yue.

=== Collet Farandole ===
Voiced by: Satomi Satō

Collet Farandole is a beastgirl who attends the magical academy in the city-state of Ariadne as a mage knight in training. She accidentally releases a memory-erasing spell on Yue, so she decides to watch over her while also hiding the truth. They become close friends, with Collet helping Yue with her studies and personal problems.

=== Kurt Godel ===
Kurt Godel is the governor-general of New Ostia and the former disciple of Eishun Konoe. He confronts Negi with knowledge of his mother and many other personal details, and a mysterious claim of knowing Negi's "true enemy." He tells Negi that he wants to rule the world, and that Negi can easily have half of it. Though he claims that he has a weak body, he is an extremely skilled swordsman, capable of quickly dispatching Negi and Asuna with perfect use of the highest-level techniques of Shinmei-ryuu that only the clan's leaders are supposed to master. He learned his swordplay from Eishun after being taken in as an orphan by Ala Rubra. He initially learned only through imitation, which impressed Eishun enough to properly teach him. After the war, he left the group because he considered their methods of saving the world to be lacking. He pursued a career in politics in Megalomesembria and fell out of touch with Jack Rakan for about 10 years. Godel wished Negi to join him to save the 67 million humans in the Magical World, and revealed to Negi the true story of how the Megalomesembria Senate used Arika as a scapegoat to seize control of the country, as well as the true culprits behind the attack on his village. Negi almost signed a contract signifying his support, until he asked Godel why he only wished to save the 67 million humans of Megalomesembria and not the whole world, and disagreed with him that it was unrealistic to save everyone. It seems that he had a crush on Arika Anarchia Entheofushia.

== Cosmo Entelecheia ==
Cosmo Entelecheia is a mysterious group that wants to destroy the Magic World for unknown purposes. Twenty years before the series, its leader the "Mage of the Beginning" or the "Life Maker", a very tall man, clad in black robes and cloaks with an empty hood, was the mastermind behind the destruction of the Magic World. He easily manages to wipe out Ala Rubra, though Nagi is eventually able to defeat him. The group later reemerges under the leadership of Fate, or at least, it seems so. In the later chapters it is revealed that Dynamis is their current leader.

=== Fate Averruncus ===
Voiced by: Akira Ishida (Japanese); Chris Patton (English)

Fate Averruncus (フェイト・アーウェルンクス, Feito Āverunkusu), whose real name is Tertium (Latin for "The Third", with the "-um" ending indicating a gender neutral object), is the main antagonist of the series. He first appears as a mercenary hired by Chigusa Amagasaki in Japan. He later appears in the Magic World with a small group of followers, and attacks Negi's group, though it is apparently only by coincidence that they meet. He later attempts to force Negi into swearing an unbreakable oath, though Negi refuses with Asuna's help. Through Jack Rakan and Fate's own word, Negi learns that Fate is a remnant of Cosmo Entelecheia, a group that Ala Rubra fought against, and that ten years before the series, Fate fought Nagi and they defeated each other. Fate claims that he is going to save the world by destroying the Magic World, though it is suggested by Nodoka's mind reading diary that he no longer cares much about the plan, and that he simply wishes for Negi to get stronger in order to be a worthy opponent like his father. It has been recently revealed that his plan to destroy the Magic World is due to the fact that it is already at risk of collapsing, and should it do so without warning, its entire inhabitants would suddenly be thrust into Mars's inhospitable landscape, cut off completely from earth.

There have been at least 3 persons with the name of Averruncus. Fate's real name is Tertium ("The Third"). Fate is much more like a human than the other two before him since his "creator" stated that he left all his parameters normal, and that he has no loyalty to his master. Jack also mentions that Fate must be the "Averruncus of earth". Near the end of the series, three more constructs with the name of Averruncus are added: Quartum ("The Fourth") - "Averruncus of fire", Quintum ("The Fifth") - "Averruncus of wind", & Sextum ("The Sixth") - "Averruncus of water".

Fate Averruncus (Tertium) is an expert in both Western and Eastern magic, and he is highly skilled in martial arts (his fighting style is Baguazhang). He use a lot of water-based spells, petrification spells, and his specialty: earth spells (all from minor to massive stone attacks). He can also perform Eastern magic (such as summoning demons). Rakan said his strength is at least 8000, but it seems that Fate might be stronger than that. He has Pactio contracts with five female mages, Shirabe (real name Brigitte), Shiori (real name Luna), Homura, Koyomi and Tamaki and possibly 57 others. He also created an item by using Asunas magic canceling power. It grants him the powers of the Mage of the Beginning called "The Code of the Life Maker", which allows him to destroy and recreate worlds or dimensions at will.

=== Dynamis ===
Dynamis is a dark skinned, long black haired muscle man who spends the majority of the story in long black mage robes and a white mask. Along with Fate Averruncus, he is one of the few members of Cosmo Entelecheia that has survived. Unlike Fate who seems to be a bit careless about their goal, Dynamis is much more determined to follow their master, the "Mage of the Beginning", wishes. Fate has showed some interest to have fun with fighting Negi, but Dynamis wants to eliminate Negi. He said in chapter 301: "I am but a defeated general who has lost his master". He is highly skilled as a shadow-user, has the ability to summon a giant shadow-demon (like during the fight with Albireo Imma under the final battle of the Great War), and he is able to transform into a stronger form of a shadow-beast (seen in chapter 301). Dynamis is the one who reviewed Fate Averruncus (both the second and the third) after the Great War. Which basically means that Dynamis is the current leader of Cosmo Entelecheia.

=== Tsukuyomi ===
Voiced by: Hiromi Tsunakake (Series 1), Rie Kugimiya (OVA) (Japanese); Samantha Inoue-Harte (English)

Tsukuyomi (月詠) is a Shinmei Ryuu swordswoman, is one of the three mercenaries hired to help Chigusa. Unlike Setsuna who uses a single sword style, she uses a sword and dagger style. She later joins with Fate in the Magic World, gathering information and spying on White Wing. She has an obsession with fighting Setsuna, often exhibiting bloodlust when doing so. She also exhibits the tendencies of being a sadist. She is shown to wield the fey blade "Hina" in the latest chapters. She appears briefly in UQ Holder with the name Tsukuyomi Iwai, where she fights on Fate's Ala Alba team.^{UQ ch. 39}

=== The Master of the Grave ===
A mysterious mage at the same size as Fate Averruncus, who first appeared at the Gateport and probably is the one who destroyed the gateport's magical barrier. She is the one who called out Poyo Rainyday for the battle, the older sister of Zazie Rainyday. In chapter 314 it seems that she might be an ancestor of Asuna and Negi, since Negi somehow recognized her and she called Negi; "my descendant". Furthermore, she also looks like Asuna. The reason she has been working with Cosmo Entelechheia has never been revealed.

=== Poyo Rainyday ===
Poyo Rainyday is Zazie's sister, and one of the higher ranked Demonfolk. She got the artifact: "Magical Lantern Circus", which is an illusion of "the perfect world" ("cosmo entelecheia").

== Other antagonists ==
=== Chigusa Amagasaki ===
Voiced by: Nanaho Katsuragi (Japanese); Christine Auten (English)

Chigusa Amagasaki (天ヶ崎 千草) was Negi's first major antagonist, the one responsible for causing trouble at beginning of the school field trip. She tried to stop Negi from giving a letter from Mahora's headmaster, to Konoe, chief of Kansai Magic Association, because she feared improved relations between the Kansai and Kantō Magic Associations. She bears a grudge against Western mages, because her parents were killed in the great magic war that both Eastern and Western mages fought in twenty years ago. Seeking revenge against Western mages, Chigusa captured Konoka, intending to use the young girl's magic potential to summon the demon god "Ryōmen Sukuna-no-Kami". She succeeded in doing so, but the demon god was defeated easily by Evangeline. Chigusa attempted to flee but was captured by Chachazero, and is now under the custody of the Kansai Magic Association.

=== Graf Wilhelm Josef Von Herrman ===
Voiced by: Hideaki Tezuka (Pachinko game)

Graf Wilhelm Josef Von Herrman (ヴィルヘルム・ヨーゼフ・フォン・へルマン, Viruherumu Yōzefu Fon Heruman) is a high level demon, who poses as a descendant of a line of German counts. He is one of the many demons who attacked Negi's village and the one who turned nearly everyone in the village to stone. He is sealed during the attack and released to gauge the threat that Negi and Asuna represent, and to temporarily disable Negi from combat. He is defeated by Negi and Kotaro, though Negi spares his life. He is connected to Fate Averruncus and his group.

In his human form, he looks like an elderly gentleman wearing a suit and a hat. He is a very strong physical fighter, with a fighting style that seems rooted in boxing, who can use magic without chanting. However, his greatest weapon is his petrification spell. He permanently petrified the citizens of Negi's childhood home. This petrification is seemingly incurable; however, it is revealed in the final volume that Konoka is capable of developing her powers sufficiently enough to restore the citizens.

== Explanatory notes ==
- "Ch." is shortened form for chapter and refers to a chapter number of the Negima manga.
