= Gwendolyn Lau =

American voice actress (born 1975)

- Born: March 23, 1975 (age 50); Houston, Texas, U.S.
- Other names: Gwen Lau
- Occupation: Voice actress
- Years active: 2004–2010, 2013–present
- Spouse: Dustin Lau

Gwendolyn Lau (born March 23, 1975) is an American voice actress. She has provided voices for a number of English-language versions of Japanese anime series.

She had taken a hiatus from voice acting which led to some of her former roles being recast with new voice actresses. She has since come back to voice acting.

== Filmography ==
=== Anime ===
- Aquarion – Manamana (Ep. 4)
- Baldr Force EXE Resolution – Minori Segawa
- BECK: Mongolian Chop Squad – Momoko Ogasawara
- Black Cat – Silphy Deacroft
- Burst Angel – Lava
- Case Closed (FUNimation dub) – Kirsten Thomas, Yuko Ikezawa, Marion Karmichael, Ari Hannigan, Alice Nagel, Harmony Wilson, Patti Parsley, Meg Wexham
- Desert Punk – Noriko (Ep. 2)
- Drifters – Olminu
- El Cazador de la Bruja – Margarita (Ep. 10)
- Fairy Tail – Daphne
- Fullmetal Alchemist and Fullmetal Alchemist: Brotherhood – Sheska
- The Galaxy Railways – Jane (Ep. 4), Catalina (Ep. 11-12)
- Ghost Hunt – Kei Ubusuna (Ep. 7-10)
- Glass Fleet – Gouda
- Gunslinger Girl -Il Teatrino – Rachelle (Ep. 10)
- Harmony – Marimi Sakurai
- Hell Girl – Keiko Yasuda (Ep. 6)
- Jormungand series – Dr. Minami "Miami" Amada
- Kiddy Grade – Mercredi, Vendredi
- Last Exile: Fam, the Silver Wing – Vasant
- Mushishi – Sayo (Ep. 16)
- Negima! series – Misa Kakizaki, Nekane Springfield
- One Piece – Makino (Funimation dub)
- Rumbling Hearts – Azusa Ishida
- Samurai 7 – Yukino
- School Rumble series – Sarah Adiemus
- Shin-Chan – Patty Milfer (Seasons 1-2)
- SoltyRei – Illumina Kisch
- Spiral: The Bonds of Reasoning – Madoka Narumi
- Suzuka – Ayano Fujikawa
- Trinity Blood – Kate Scott
- Tsubasa: Reservoir Chronicle – Chenyan
- Tsukuyomi: Moon Phase – Haiji (Cat)
- Witchblade – Rie Nishida
- xxxHolic – Nanami (Ep. 8)
- Yu Yu Hakusho – Kuroko Satou
