= Illegal drug trade in Japan =

Drug trade in Japan

The illegal drug trade in Japan is the illegal production, transport, sale, and use of prohibited drugs in Japan. The drug trade is influenced by various factors, including history, economic conditions, and cultural norms. While methamphetamine is historically the most widely trafficked illegal drug in post-World War II Japan, marijuana, cocaine, and other prohibited substances are also present. Additionally, Japan's status as a developed economy and the presence of organized crime in Japan have made it a target of the international drug trade.

== Cultivation and processing ==
As early as the Yayoi period, hemp was cultivated and made into clothing. By the start of the Meiji period, hemp was widely cultivated in Japan as a medicine for treating asthma and as a raw material of hemp rope and hemp garments for fishing. At the end of the 19th century, hemp was widely grown for its fibers for use in textiles similar to cotton. In the 1930s largely due to Harry J. Anslinger's efforts to promote his new department, the Federal Bureau of Narcotics, mainstream American society began to believe that cannabis was harmful, and the government began to formulate relevant measures against cannabis. By the end of World War II during the American occupation of Japan, the prohibition of marijuana in the United States had influenced the prohibition of marijuana in Japan and the Cannabis Control Law of 1948 was passed which strictly controlled the possession and cultivation of the cannabis plant. Even so, the illegal cultivation and possession of marijuana cannot be totally banned. Now, indoor cultivation technology has been adopted in many areas of Japan.

== Drug abuse ==
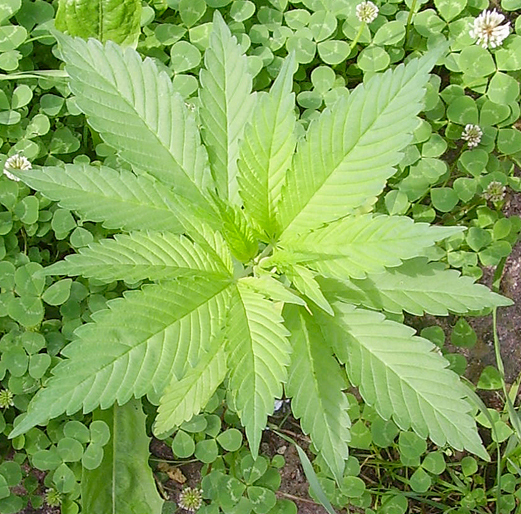
Hemp plant

The first epidemic of methamphetamine abuse in Japan began at the end of World War II. During World War 2 methamphetamine was sold under the name Philopon and used by many people from soldiers to factory workers. After the war surplus methamphetamine flooded the market and an estimated 1.5 million people were using meth in Japan. The Japanese Ministry of Health prohibited meth use in 1951. The dependence and neurotoxicity caused by methamphetamine were not well known at the time. Another report found that 550,000 people abused methamphetamine in the 12 years after the end of World War II.

In the 1960s, as in many parts of the world, hippie culture flourished, and futen-zoku emerged as a Japanese version of the Western hippie. Although psychedelic use is a well-known aspect of the hippie subculture, such drugs are difficult to obtain in Japan. For this reason hippies often turned to organic solvents instead. Japan experienced sustained economic growth until 1970, when growth suddenly slowed. The second major instance of drug abuse was directly promoted by Japan's domestic yakuza groups, who organized the trafficking of methamphetamine. Yakuza groups built methamphetamine manufacturing plants in South Korea and Taiwan, and smuggled the drug into Japan to sell to students as well as the general public. This is also a major factor in the rise of young drug users in Japan, and why intravenous drug users are more likely to use methamphetamine. In 1980, 40 percent of Japan's organic solvents and 40 per cent of its amphetamine-type drugs were abused. Arrests related to abuse of organic solvents peaked at 36,796 in 1982 and then began to decline, falling sharply after 1992.

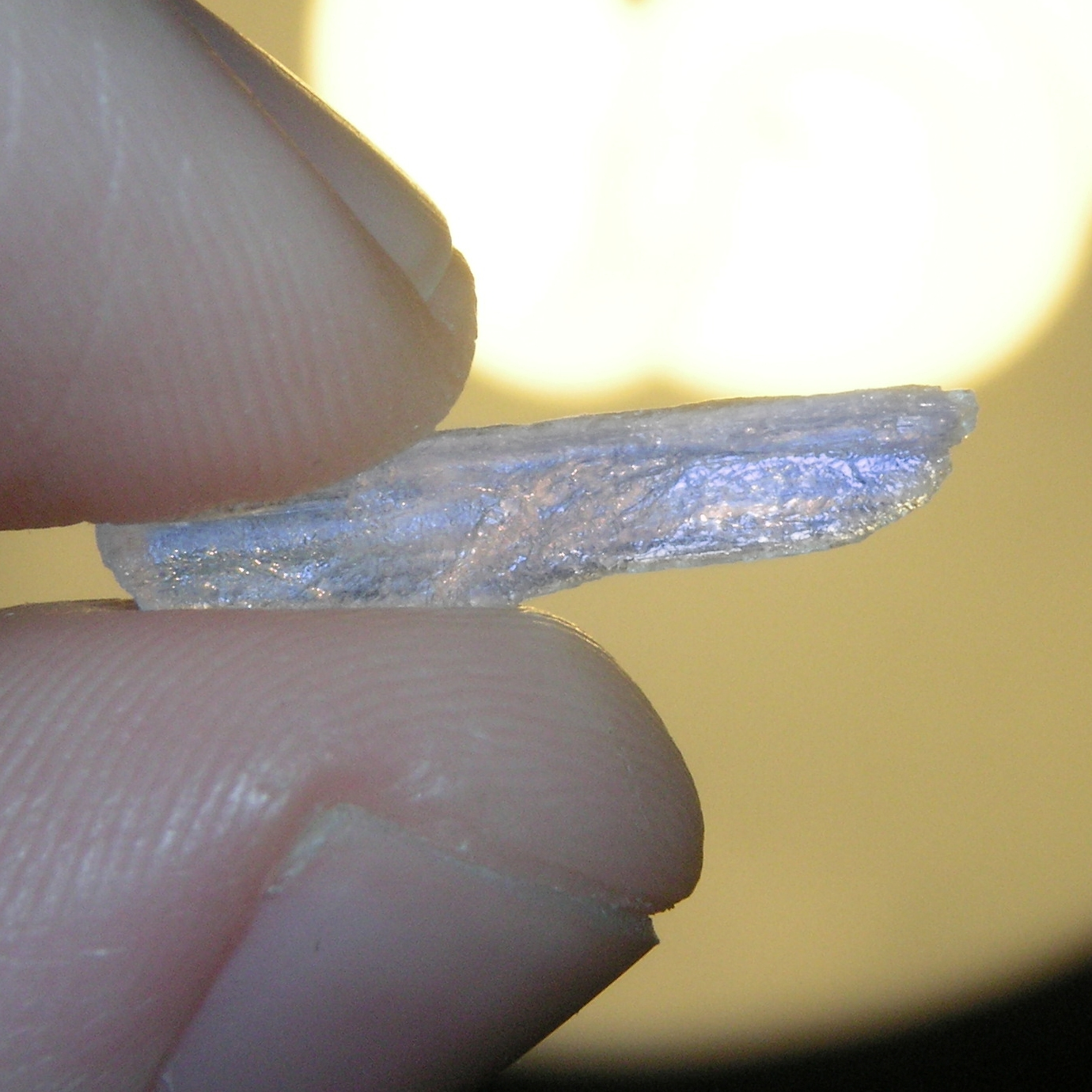
Methamphetamine crystal

In the 1990s, the Japanese economy experienced a severe recession, which caused economic development to stagnate, and drug abuse increased once again. Before 2002 psilocybin mushrooms were legal in Japan and could be found in mail-order shops, online vendors and in smart shops throughout Japan. A member of Japan's Health Ministry narcotics division, Hideo Eno, stated that prior to 2002, psilocybin mushrooms could be found anywhere. Japan Health, Labor and Welfare Ministry added psilocybin mushrooms to Schedule Narcotics of Narcotic and Psychotropic Drug Control Law in June of 2002, possibly in preparation for the World Cup, as well as possibly a response to instances of inexperienced people panicking and injuring themselves while under the influence of psilocybin mushrooms. At the same time, the prevalence of abuse shifted from organic solvents back to methamphetamine abuse, with a sharp decline in solvent-related arrests. These drugs come mainly from other Asian countries, such as China and South Korea. This was the time when people started to be able to buy drugs directly from drug dealers via cell phones and pagers. Also in the 1990s, the United States and Latin American countries intensified their war on drugs such as cocaine, and drug smugglers began to turn to the Japanese market, causing rapid growth in the circulation of cocaine in Japan.

Cannabis use in Japan has also increased in recent years. One noticeable change in 2006 was that cannabis- related arrests in Japan outnumbered solvent-related arrests. The number of celebrity arrests for marijuana-related crimes also increased significantly. With the recent development of Internet technology, Japanese people can obtain marijuana through multiple channels. Marijuana trade can happen in primary schools up to universities and out in general society.

Compared to North America or Europe, illegal drug use is highly taboo in Japan, and drug users are shunned from society. Even celebrities caught with drugs can suffer dire consequences to their reputations and careers.

== Trafficking ==
=== Trafficking groups ===
The number of drugs produced in Japan is relatively small; therefore almost all the drugs used by the people are smuggled from abroad, and neighboring countries and other Southeast Asian countries are important suppliers to Japan.

In the mid-to-late 20th century, Japan's domestic criminal organizations were heavily involved in drug trafficking by establishing drug factories overseas, using local raw materials and labor, and then shipping manufactured goods back to Japan by sea. These methods maximize profits and are less risky than domestic production. With the efforts of the surrounding countries, these methods have been reduced in the 21st century. It is reported that there are still some international airlines in China, Mexico and South Korea to obtain drugs after landing in a number of airports and ports in Japan. Some members of criminal organizations then use special methods to bring drugs into the country. The news was reported by Kenji Ogata in the Asahi Shimbun, one of Japan's largest publications.

Ships used to be the main means of transport for drug smugglers, but when Japanese customs and police stepped up inspections around 2005, things became very different. In the 1990s, according to Japan's national police agency, it was common for police to seize up to a ton of performance-enhancing drugs over a year, when the main means of smuggling was by ship. The crackdown has forced smugglers to switch to smaller shipments, including stashing drugs in luggage on flights to Japan. As a result of these policies, drug trafficking in Japan has been greatly reduced for some time. Traffickers stepped up their smuggling activities after 2009, using more commercial flights as the main means of transporting drugs. For the whole of 2009, the total drug seizures again exceeded 200 kilograms. Japan's national authority has sometimes instructed local police and customs to allow drug smugglers to make it past airport security in order to expose their in-country distribution routes. In recent years, suppliers of illicit drugs have spread to regions such as Nigeria and Uganda. It has even been reported that drug trafficking is the main source of income for terrorist organizations in Africa. Japanese police say terrorist groups may have moved their operations to Japan in search of higher profits.

=== Drug seizures ===
==== 2016 ====
In total, 1,649 kilograms of drugs were seized in 2016, about 3.2 times the amount seized in the same period last year, according to the annual report by Japan customs, and the second most since 2,186 kilograms in 1999. Among them, the seizure of methamphetamine significantly increased to 1,501 kg, about 3.6 times that of the same period last year, which is the highest record in history. The amount of methamphetamine seized could allow drug users in Japan to use it 503,000 times. According to the transport routes, 53 cases of smuggling of air passengers were detected, representing a significant increase, up 43% from the same period last year. Except for aviation, the number of drugs seized by all means has increased significantly, and large-scale smuggling activities have become prominent. Among them, two cases of drug smuggling by sea have been seized, which are not seen for many years.

In terms of the source of the seizures, China led the pack with 1,049 kilograms, 10.1 times the previous year, followed by Mexico with a total of 260 kilograms. The top five countries are the same as last year, with the share of the top three increasing to more than 90 percent of the total.

It's worth noting that marijuana detection is down 75 percent from last year, the lowest in the past. While still at high levels, the upward trend of the past two years has stopped, indicating that the volume of cannabis transactions has decreased.

==== 2014 ====
In 2014, Japanese customs seized 390 cases of illegal drugs, an increase of 2% over the previous year, and seized about 630 kilograms of drugs, a decrease of 37% over the previous year. The number of seizures was 174, up 13 per cent from the same period last year. The seized weight was about 549 kilograms. Both quantity and weight are in the high data range. The number of contraband seizures made by air passengers was the second highest on record, with 30 cases in Thailand, representing a significant increase. There were 99 seizures of cannabis products with a seizure weight of about 74 kilograms, both of which had turned from a downward trend in the previous year to an upward trend.

==== 2011 ====
Illegal drug trafficking cases increased by 10 percent to 326 in 2011 compared with 2010. About 509 kilograms of stimulants and cannabis powder drugs were seized, up 40 per cent on the previous year. Seizures of 20,000 MDMA, psychotropic drugs and other tablets were down 40 per cent from last year. The number of doping cases seized reached 185, which was the highest record at that time. It is worth noting that smugglers come from different nationalities around the world and that there has been a significant increase in the number of people with European nationality, as well as an increase in the number of cases involving juvenile smugglers.

==== 2006 ====
In 2006, Japanese customs officers seized 378 cases of prohibited illicit drugs weighing 377 kilograms. About 80 percent of those arrested in connection with stimulants represented the most widespread illegal drug abuse in Japan at the time.

While China remained the largest smuggling source on the major routes in 2006, the number of smuggling cases from Canada and Malaysia increased. As for the smuggling methods, in addition to the smuggling of stimulant packages on the body by air passengers, sea passengers and cabin crew, and hiding stimulants in the international mail service, there are some new methods, such as soaking stimulant solution in bath towels and hiding cannabis in clothes racks.

== Treaties and conventions ==
In July 1948, the Japanese government promulgated the cannabis control law, which clearly stipulated the cultivation, transportation, sales and personal use of cannabis. Without the approval of the government, the cultivation, possession or use of marijuana is not allowed, and even the collection of mature wild marijuana leaves is illegal. In March 1953, the Japanese government promulgated the "Narcotics and Psychotropics Control Act" to control more drugs. At the same time, the ministry of narcotic drugs prohibition was also established as a special department for drug control.

In 1972, Japan promulgated the "toxic drugs and strong drugs control act", which began to restrict the production and sale of organic solvents, but the problem of organic solvents drug abuse is still particularly serious.

The Japanese government has gradually increased its emphasis on fighting drug crimes. In addition to legislative restrictions, in 2003 it formulated new strategy against drug abuse. In order to curb the increasingly rampant drug smuggling crimes, the Japanese government has also formulated the emergency measures to prevent drug smuggling.
