= List of Negima songs =

This is a complete list of songs from the Negima! anime and live action series. The voice actresses and the live action actresses of the girls in Negi's class sing all the songs in the anime and live action series respectively.

== Character Songs ==
Many character CDs were released; on them was a greeting, original song, a karaoke version of that song, a remix, a short mini-drama and a free talk with the voice actors. One Character CD was released once a month.

English Title	Japanese Title		Time	Artist
English Title	Kanji	Romaji	Time	Artist
Character Single Vol.1-Asuna Kagurazaka
"Always Love & Dream"	いつだってLove&Dream	Itsudatte Love & Dream	3:42	Akemi Kanda
Character Single Vol.2- Konoka Konoe
"Sunday"	にちようび	Nichiyōbi	4:33	Ai Nonaka
Character Single Vol.3- The Library Exploration Club -Yue Ayase, Haruna Saotome, Nodoka Miyazaki
"Invitation ~Welcome to the Library~"	Invitation〜図書館へいらっしゃい〜	Invitation ~ Toshokan e irrasshai	3:44	Natsuko Kuwatani, Sawa Ishige, and Mamiko Noto
Character Single Vol.4-The Cheerleading Club - Sakurako Shiina, Misa Kakizaki, Madoka Kugimiya
"If Pom-Poms are in Our Hands, We'll win"	ポンポン両手にあればWin	Ponpon ryōte ni areba Win	4:04	Akane Omae, Shizuka Itou, and Mami Deguchi
Character Single Vol.5 - Chisame Hasegawa
"It's Alright to LikE- Me"	スキになってもe-よ	Suki ni natte mo e-yo	3:46	Yumi Shimura
Character Single Vol.6 - The Sports Girls - Makie Sasaki, Akira Ookouchi, Yuuna Akashi, Ako Izumi
"GLOW WILD"			4:48	Yui Horie, Azumi Yamamoto, Madoka Kimura, Kotomi Yamakawa
Character Single Vol.7- Satsuki Yotsuba, Chao Rinshen, Satomi Hakase
"The Area of Love"	恋の面積	Koi no Menseki	5:10	Naomi Inoue, Chiaki Osawa, and Mai Kadowaki
Character Single Vol.8- The Fighting Four- Kuu Fei, Setsuna Sakurazaki, Mana Tatsumiya, Kaede Nagase
"KIZUNA"			3:48	Hazuki Tanaka, Yu Kobayashi, Miho Sakuma, and Ryoko Shiraishi
Character Single Vol.9- Ayaka Yukihiro
"The Angel After Rains"	雨上がりの天使	Ameagari no Tenshi	4:35	Junko Minagawa
Character Single Vol.10- Yami no Fukuin and Doll- Evangeline A.K. McDowell, Chachamaru Karakuri, and Sayo Aisaka
"Maze of the dark"			4:28	Yuki Matsuoka, Akeno Watanabe, and Yuri Shiratori
Character Single Vol.11- The Trick Trio Fuuka and Fumika Narutaki, Kasuga Misora
"It's my life"			4:02	Kimiko Koyama, Mari Kanou, Ai Bandou
Character Single Vol.12- The Culture Club Kazumi Asakura, Chizuru Naba, Natsumi Murakami, and Zazie Rainyday
"Girls, be ambitious ~Let's be Cinderellas~"	Girls, be ambitious〜シンデレラになろうよ〜	Girls, be ambitious〜 Shinderera ni narō yo〜	4:23	Ayana Sasagawa, Misa Kobayashi, Mai Aizawa, and Yuka Inokuchi

== Negima! Anime ==
For most episodes, the Negima anime uses one opening song that has multiple versions.

Each version is sung by a group of five or six of the girls, organized by seat number.

=== Opening ===
Title	Kanji	Artist	Episode
Happy☆Material ver. 1 - Original Version	ハッピー☆マテリアル	Yuri Shiratori (Sayo Aisaka); Madoka Kimura (Yuuna Akashi); Ayana Sasagawa (Kazumi Asakura); Natsuko Kuwatani (Yue Ayase); Kotomi Yamakawa (Ako Izumi); Azumi Yamamoto (Akira Ookōchi)	1-4
Happy☆Material ver. 2 - More Rock Version	ハッピー☆マテリアル	Shizuka Itou (Misa Kakizaki); Akemi Kanda (Asuna Kagurazaka); Ai Bandou (Misora Kasuga); Akeno Watanabe (Chachamaru Karakuri); Mami Deguchi (Madoka Kugimiya)	5-8
Happy☆Material ver. 3 - More Happy Version	ハッピー☆マテリアル	Hazuki Tanaka (Ku Fei); Ai Nonaka (Konoka Konoe); Sawa Ishige (Haruna Saotome); Yu Kobayashi (Setsuna Sakurazaki); Yui Horie (Makie Sasaki)	9-13
Happy☆Material ver. 4 - Beloved Version	ハッピー☆マテリアル	Akane Omae (Sakurako Shina); Miho Sakuma (Mana Tatsumiya); Chiaki Osawa (Chao Lingshen); Ryoko Shiraishi (Kaede Nagase); Misa Kobayashi (Chizuru Naba)	14-17
Happy☆Material ver. 5 - Electric Version	ハッピー☆マテリアル	Kimiko Koyama (Fuuka Narutaki); Mari Kanou (Fumika Narutaki); Mai Kadowaki (Satomi Hakase); Yumi Shimura (Chisame Hasegawa); Yuki Matsuoka (Evangeline A.K. McDowell)	18-21
Happy☆Material ver. 6 - Early Summer Version	ハッピー☆マテリアル	Mamiko Noto (Nodoka Miyazaki); Mai Aizawa (Natsumi Murakami); Junko Minagawa (Ayaka Yukihiro); Naomi Inoue (Satsuki Yotsuba); Yuka Inokuchi (Zazie Rainyday)	22-23, 25
(second half of) Ashita na	明日の	Shinkichi Mitsumune	24
Happy☆Material ver. 7 - 31 Girl Version (TV-size only)	ハッピー☆マテリアル	Mahora Gakuen Chuutoubu 3-A	26
=== Ending ===
Title	Kanji/Romaji	Artist	Episode
To The Shining You	輝く君へ; Kagayaku Kimi e	Akemi Kanda (Asuna Kagurazaka); Ai Nonaka (Konoka Konoe); Mamiko Noto (Nodoka Miyazaki); Yuu Kobayashi (Setsuna Sakurazaki)	1-13
Please Teach Me, Master	おしえてほしいぞぉ、師匠(マスター); Oshiete hoshii zō, Masutā	Ayana Sasagawa (Kazumi Asakura); Natsuko Kuwatani (Yue Ayase); Akeno Watanabe (Chachamaru Karakuri); Hazuki Tanaka (Kû-Fei); Yuki Matsuoka (Evangeline A.K. McDowell)	14-22, 24–25
Happy☆Material ver. 9 - Acoustic Version	ハッピー☆マテリアル; Happii☆Materialu		23
To The Shining You ~ Peace	輝く君へ〜Peace; Kagayaku Kimi e ~ Peace	Mahora Gakuen Chyuutoubu 3-A	26

=== Spring OVA ===
	Title	Kanji/Romaji	Artist
Opening	Dreams ☆ Everyone!	夢☆みんなで!/Yume ☆ Minnade!	Akemi Kanda (Asuna Kagurazaka); Rina Satou (Negi Springfield)
Ending	Good Morning!	おはよう!/Ohayō!	Akemi Kanda (Asuna Kagurazaka)
=== Summer OVA ===
	Title	Kanji/Romaji	Artist
Opening	Love☆Sensation	らぶ☆センセーション/Rabu☆Senseshon	Rina Satou (Negi Springfield); Akemi Kanda (Asuna Kagurazaka); Ai Nonaka (Konoka Konoe)
Ending	Magical Happiness☆	マジカルハピネス☆/Majikaru Hapinesu☆	Mamiko Noto (Nodoka Miyazaki)
=== Other ===
	Title	Kanji/Romaji	Artist
Special	Happy☆Material ver. 8 - Now and Oldies Version (Full size only)	ハッピー☆マテリアル	Rina Satou (Negi Springfield); Masami Suzuki (Nekane Springfield); Ryou Hirohashi (Anya)
Released as a bonus with a special edition version of the first Japanese DVD

== Negima!? Anime ==
=== Opening ===
Title	Artist	Characters	Episode
1000% SPARKING! (Main Version (Version 1))	Rina Satou, Akemi Kanda, Ai Nonaka & Yu Kobayashi	Negi, Asuna, Konoka, Setsuna	2-4, 8–12, 15, 17, 26
1000% SPARKING! (Alternate Version (Version 2))	Hazuki, Junko Minagawa & Yui Horie	Kū Fei, Ayaka, Makie	5-7,16, 25
Eien no Toki o Koete (Chupa-Negi Opening)	Junko Minagawa	Ayaka	13, 14
1000% SPARKING! (Episode 19 Version(Version 7))	Akeno Watanabe, Mai Kadowaki & Yuki Matsuoka	Chachamaru, Satomi, Evangeline	19
1000% SPARKING! (Episode 20 Version (Version 3))	Mamiko Noto, Natsuko Kuwatani & Sawa Ishige	Nodoka, Yue, Haruna	20
1000% SPARKING! (Episode 21 Version (Version 4))	Ryoko Shiraishi, Kimiko Koyama & Mari Kanou	Kaede, Fuuka, Fumika	21
1000% SPARKING! (Episode 22 Version (Version 5))	Madoka Kimura, Kotomi Yamakawa, Azumi Yamamoto & Ai Bandou	Yuuna, Ako, Akira, Misora	22
1000% SPARKING! (Final Battle Version (Version 11))	Rina Satou, Miyuki Sawashiro & Chiwa Saito	Negi, Nekane, Anya	23, 24
1000% SPARKING! (Version 6)	Shizuka Itoh, Mami Deguchi & Akane Omae	Misa, Madoka, Sakurako	18
=== Ending ===
Title	Artists	Characters	Episode
Starry Sky Letter/星空レター/Hoshizora Retā	Akemi Kanda	Asuna	1-3
A-LY-YA! (Version 1)	Rina Satou, Akemi Kanda, Ai Nonaka & Yu Kobayashi	Negi, Asuna, Konoka, Setsuna	4-6, 10, 12–15
A-LY-YA! (Version 2)	Hazuki, Junko Minagawa & Yui Horie	Kū Fei, Ayaka, Makie	7
A-LY-YA! (Version 3)	Mamiko Noto, Natsuko Kuwatani & Sawa Ishige	Nodoka, Yue, Haruna	8, 11, 21
A-LY-YA! (Version 4)	Ryoko Shiraishi, Kimiko Koyama & Mari Kanou	Kaede, Fuuka, Fumika	9
A-LY-YA! (Version 5)	Madoka Kimura, Kotomi Yamakawa, Azumi Yamamoto & Ai Bando	Yuuna, Ako, Akira, Misora	16
A-LY-YA! (Version 6)	Shizuka Itoh, Mami Deguchi & Akane Omae	Misa, Madoka, Sakurako	17
A-LY-YA! (Version 7)	Akeno Watanabe, Mai Kadowaki & Yuki Matsuoka	Chachamaru, Satomi, Evangeline	18
A-LY-YA! (Version 8)	Miho Sakuma, Misa Kobayashi, Yumi Shimura, Mai Aizawa & Yuka Inokuchi	Mana, Chizuru, Chisame, Natsumi, Zazie	19, 22
A-LY-YA! (Version 9)	Yuri Shiratori, Ayana Sasagawa, Megumi Takamoto & Naomi Inoue	Sayo, Kazumi, Chao, Satsuki	20, 23
A-LY-YA! (Version 10)	Rina Satou, Akemi Kanda, Ai Nonaka, Yu Kobayashi, Hazuki, Junko Minagawa, Yui Horie, Mamiko Noto, Natsuko Kuwatani, Sawa Ishige, Ryoko Shiraishi, Kimiko Koyama, Mari Kanou, Madoka Kimura, Kotomi Yamakawa, Azumi Yamamoto, Ai Bando, Shizuka Itoh, Mami Deguchi, Akane Omae, Akeno Watanabe, Mai Kadowaki, Yuki Matsuoka, Miho Sakuma, Misa Kobayashi, Yumi Shimura, Mai Aizawa, Yuka Inokuchi, Yuri Shiratori, Ayana Sasagawa, Megumi Takamoto & Naomi Inoue	Negi, Class of 3-A	24
Love☆Sensation	Rina Satou, Akemi Kanda & Ai Nonaka	Negi, Asuna, Konoka	25
1000% SPARKING! (Final Episode Version)	Rina Satou, Akemi Kanda, Ai Nonaka, Yu Kobayashi, Hazuki, Junko Minagawa, Yui Horie, Mamiko Noto, Natsuko Kuwatani, Sawa Ishige, Ryoko Shiraishi, Kimiko Koyama, Mari Kanou, Madoka Kimura, Kotomi Yamakawa, Azumi Yamamoto, Ai Bando, Shizuka Itoh, Mami Deguchi, Akane Omae, Akeno Watanabe, Mai Kadowaki, Yuki Matsuoka, Miho Sakuma, Misa Kobayashi, Yumi Shimura, Mai Aizawa, Yuka Inokuchi, Yuri Shiratori, Ayana Sasagawa, Megumi Takamoto & Naomi Inoue	Negi, Class of 3-A	26
=== Insert Songs ===
Title	Artists	Episode
Happy☆Material - Original Version	Yuri Shiratori, Madoka Kimura, Ayana Sasagawa, Natsuko Kuwatani, Kotomi Yamakawa & Azumi Yamamoto	14
Mahora Sentai Baka Ranger	Natsuko Kuwatani, Akemi Kanda, Hazuki Tanaka, Yui Horie, Ryoko Shiraishi	1-3, 7, 10

== Magister Negi Magi: Mahō Sensei Negima!! ==
Below is a list of songs from the Negima!! live action adaptation.

=== Opening ===
Title	Kanji	Artists	Episode
Pink Generation ver. 1 - Original Version		Mahora Gakuen Chuutoubu 3-A (Mai Nishida, Mayo Yamamoto, Mihoko Kondo, Ami Ōse, Izumi Fujimoto, Yūki Takikawa, Asumi Ōshima, Sara Wakatsuki, Shizuka Hasegawa, Mari Saigusa, Madoka Ichikawa, Sari Okamoto, Hiroko Matsunaga, Ayumi Watanabe, Haruki Ichikawa, Yuri Kawase, Ao Kayama, Juri, Keaki Watanabe, Yūna Arai, Ai Tanimoto, Saya Kataoka, Manaka Yamamoto, Ririko Uchida, Natsuko Asō, Sakina Kuwae, Miyū Wagawa, Eri Mukunoki, Rei Ōtsuka, Mei Shimizu, & Taeka Hatazawa)	1-5, 13
Pink Generation ver. 2 - Asuna, Konoka, & Setsuna version		Sara Wakatsuki (Asuna Kagurazaka); Hiroko Matsunaga (Konoka Konoe); Haruki Ichikawa (Setsuna Sakurazaki)	6-8
Yes! Baka Ranger!	Yes!バカレンジャー! Yes! Bakarenjā!	Sara Wakatsuki (Asuna Kagurazaka); Yuri Kawase (Makie Sasaki); Ami Ōse (Yue Ayase); Yūna Arai (Kaede Nagase); Sari Okamoto (Kū Fei)	9
Pink Generation ver. 3 - Makie, Ayaka, & Chisame version		Yuri Kawase (Makie Sasaki); Rei Ōtsuka (Ayaka Yukihiro); Natsuko Asō (Chisame Hasegawa)	10-13
Pink Generation ver. 4 - pRythme version		pRythme (Yuri Kawase, Makie Sasaki; Natsuko Asō, Chisame Hasegawa; Eri Mukunoki, Natsumi Murakami)	14-25
kIzuna		pRythme (Yuri Kawase, Makie Sasaki; Natsuko Asō, Chisame Hasegawa; Eri Mukunoki, Natsumi Murakami)	26
=== Ending ===
Title (Romaji)	Kanji	Artist	Episode
Tsuyoku Naare	つよくなーれ; Tsuyoku nāre	Sara Wakatsuki (Asuna Kagurazaka); Hiroko Matsunaga (Konoka Konoe); Haruki Ichikawa (Setsuna Sakurazaki)	1-8, 10
Ai no Shisha wa Itsutsu Hoshi!	愛の使者は5つ星!	Sara Wakatsuki (Asuna Kagurazaka); Yuri Kawase (Makie Sasaki); Ami Ōse (Yue Ayase); Yūna Arai (Kaede Nagase); Sari Okamoto (Kū Fei)	9
Move On!		Yuri Kawase (Makie Sasaki); Rei Ōtsuka (Ayaka Yukihiro); Natsuko Asō (Chisame Hasegawa)	11-13
Yūki no Aji!	ユウキノアジ!	pRythme (Yuri Kawase, Makie Sasaki; Natsuko Asō, Chisame Hasegawa; Eri Mukunoki, Natsumi Murakami)	14-19
kIzuna		pRythme (Yuri Kawase, Makie Sasaki; Natsuko Asō, Chisame Hasegawa; Eri Mukunoki, Natsumi Murakami)	20-24
Endless Sky		A×K (Sara Wakatsuki, Asuna Kagurazaka; Kondo Mihoko, Kazumi Asakura)	25
=== Character Songs ===
Title (Romaji)	Kanji	Artist	Episode
Be Yourself		Sara Wakatsuki (Asuna Kagurazaka)
Kokoro, Nijuusou	こころ、二重奏	Hiroko Matsunaga (Konoka Konoe) & Haruki Ichikawa (Setsuna Sakurazaki)
Baby Love		Natsuko Asō (Chisame Hasegawa)
Tomodachi Note♯	トモダチnote♯	Ayumi Watanabe (Haruna Saotome); Miyū Wagawa (Nodoka Miyazaki); Ami Ōse (Yue Ayase)
Shiawase Sagashi	シアワセサガシ	Rei Ōtsuka (Ayaka Yukihiro); Ai Tanimoto (Chizuru Naba); Eri Mukunoki (Natsumi Murakami)
Never Ever		Mari Saigusa (Chachamaru Karakuri); Sakina Kuwae (Evangeline A.K. McDowell)
Kitto Dokitto!	きっとドキッと!	Saya Kataoka (Fūka Narutaki); Manaka Yamamoto (Fumika Narutaki); Yūna Arai (Kaede Nagase)
Sekai ni Ai wo Sakase Masho♥	世界に愛を咲かせましょ♥	Keaki Watanabe (Chao Lingshen); Ririko Uchida (Satomi Hakase); Mei Shimizu (Satsuki Yotsuba)
Start! Start! Start!		Madoka Ichikawa (Madoka Kugimiya); Izumi Fujimoto (Ako Izumi); Asumi Ōshima (Misa Kakizaki); Ao Kayama (Sakurako Shiina)
Starry		Mai Nishida (Sayo Aisaka); Mihoko Kondo (Kazumi Asakura)
Taiyō to Tsuki no Destiny	太陽と月のDestiny	Juri (Mana Tatsumiya); Taeka Hatazawa (Zazie Rainyday)
Looooop!!!!!		Sara Wakatsuki (Asuna Kagurazaka); Yuri Kawase (Makie Sasaki); Ami Ōse (Yue Ayase); Yūna Arai (Kaede Nagase); Sari Okamoto (Kū Fei)
Boku-tachi no Kizuna	僕たちのキズナ	Shizuka Hasegawa (Misora Kasuga); Yūki Takikawa (Akira Ōkouchi); Yuri Kawase (Makie Sasaki); Mayo Yamamoto (Yūna Akashi); Izumi Fujimoto (Ako Izumi)

== Negima! Shiroki Tsubasa Ala Alba OAD ==
=== Opening ===
Title	Episode
Happy Material Return	1-3

=== Ending ===
Title	Episode
Kagayaku Kimi he	1-2
Happy Material Return	3

== Negima! Mou Hitotsu no Sekai Another World OAD ==
=== Opening ===
Title	Artist	Episode
LOVE♥Drive	Kanda Akemi, Noto Mamiko, Nonaka Ai, Kobayashi Yuu & Satou Rina	1-4
Magical Twinkle Sky	Kuwatani Natsuko, Satou Satomi, Taketatsu Ayana & Hanazawa Kana	5 (Extra)

=== Ending ===
Title	Artist	Episode
Get a Chance!	Satou Rina, Inoue Marina, Koyama Rikiya, Shimura Yumi, Yabe Masahito, Ono Daisuke & Matsuoka Yuki	1-4
Good vibration!!	Kuwatani Natsuko, Satou Satomi, Taketatsu Ayana & Hanazawa Kana	5 (Extra)

== Mahou Sensei Negima! Anime Final ==
=== Opening ===
Title
A Precious Pride

=== Ending ===
Title
Sakura Kaze ni Yakusoku wo - Tabidachi no Uta; Song of Departure-a promise in the wind-Sakura

=== Credits ===
Title
Happy Sunshine
