= Shiina =

Shiina or Shīna (written: 椎名) is a Japanese surname. Notable people with the surname include:

- Ayumi Shiina (椎名 あゆみ; born 1969), Japanese manga artist
- Chisato Shiina (椎名 千里; born 1982), Japanese figure skater
- Eihi Shiina (椎名 英姫; born 1976), Japanese model and actress
- Shiina Etsusaburo (椎名 悦三郎; 1898–1979), Japanese politician
- Hekiru Shiina (椎名 へきる; born 1974), Japanese voice actress and singer
- Go Shiina (椎名 豪; born 1974), Japanese anime and video game composer
- Isamu Shiina (椎名 勇), Japanese chemist
- Junpei Shiina (椎名 純平; born 1974), Japanese singer-songwriter
- Karuho Shiina (椎名 軽穂), Japanese manga artist
- Katsutoshi Shiina (born 1961), Japanese karateka
- Kazuma Shiina (椎名 一馬; born 1986), Japanese footballer
- Kazuyasu Shiina (椎名 一保; born 1952), Japanese politician
- Kensuke Shiina, Japanese DJ and musician
- Kippei Shiina (椎名 桔平; born 1964), Japanese actor
- Mai Shiina, Japanese karateka
- Nobuyuki Shiina (椎名 伸志; born 1991), Japanese footballer
- Noriko Shiina (椎名 法子; born 1982), Japanese actress and singer
- Ringo Shiina (椎名 林檎; born 1978), Japanese singer-songwriter
- Rinzō Shiina (椎名 麟三; 1911–1973), Japanese writer and playwright
- Takashi Shiina (椎名 高志; born 1965), Japanese manga artist
- Shiina Yasutane (椎名 康胤; died 1576), Japanese daimyō
- You Shiina (椎名 優), Japanese illustrator and manga artist
- Yutaka Shiina (椎名 豊; born 1964), Japanese jazz pianist and composer

Notable people with the given name include:

- Shiina Natsukawa (夏川 椎菜; born 1996), Japanese voice actress and singer

== Fictional characters ==
=== Surname ===
- Eri Shiina of Angel Beats!
- Mahiru Shiina of The Angel Next Door Spoils Me Rotten
- Mashiro Shiina of Sakurasou no Pet na Kanojo
- Mayuri Shiina of Steins;Gate
- Miyako Shiina of Maji de Watashi ni Koi Shinasai!
- Sakurako Shiina of Negima!
- Taki Shiina of BanG Dream!
- Yousuke Shiina of Ninpuu Sentai Hurricaneger
- Mahiru Shiina of MILGRAM

=== Given name ===
- Sheena Fujibayashi, a character in the video game Tales of Symphonia
- Shiina Tamai (玉依 シイナ) a character in the manga series Shadow Star
- Shiina "Misha" Mikado, a character in the visual novel Katawa Shoujo
