= Animation Kobe =

Animation Kobe Awards
- Awarded for: Excellence in animation achievements
- Country: Japan
- Presented by: Animation Kobe Organizing Committee, Kobe city
- First award: 1996
- Final award: 2015
- Website: anime-kobe.jp

The Animation Kobe (Japanese: アニメーション神戸) was an event established by Kobe in 1996 to promote anime and other visual media. The Animation Kobe Awards (アニメーション神戸賞) were given annually until 2015 by Kobe and the Organising Committee to creators and creations.

== Event ==
Animation Kobe was held annually in Kobe from 1996 to 2015. In addition to the awards ceremony, the event held talk shows and screenings of the prize winners. In 2006, the 11th event was carried live on the official website.

No.	Event name	Date	Place
1	The 1st Animation Kobe	December 8, 1996	Kobe Fashion Mart
2	The 2nd Animation Kobe	November 24, 1997	Kobe Portopia Hotel
3	The 3rd Animation Kobe	November 22, 1998	Kobe International Conference Center, Main Hall
4	The 4th Animation Kobe	November 13, 1999	Kobe International Conference Center, Main Hall
5	The 5th Animation Kobe	November 12, 2000	Kobe International Conference Center, Main Hall
6	The 6th Animation Kobe	September 16, 2001	Kobe International Conference Center, Main Hall
7	The 7th Animation Kobe	November 10, 2002	Kobe International Conference Center, Main Hall
8	The 8th Animation Kobe	November 9, 2003	Kobe Chamber of Commerce and Industry Hall
9	The 9th Animation Kobe	November 14, 2004	Xebec hall
10	The 10th Animation Kobe	October 2, 2005	Kobe International Conference Center, Main Hall
11	The 11th Animation Kobe	November 19, 2006	Xebec hall
12	The 12th Animation Kobe	November 4, 2007	Nishiyama Kinen-kaikan
13	The 13th Animation Kobe	November 2, 2008	Kobe International Conference Center, Main Hall
14	The 14th Animation Kobe	October 18, 2009	Kobe International Conference Center, Main Hall
15	The 15th Animation Kobe	November 28, 2010	Kobe International Conference Center, Main Hall
16	The 16th Animation Kobe	October 6, 2011	Kobe International Conference Center, Main Hall
17	The 17th Animation Kobe	December 2, 2012	Kobe International Conference Center, Main Hall
18	The 18th Animation Kobe	December 8, 2013	Kobe International Conference Center, Main Hall
19	The 19th Animation Kobe	December 7, 2014	Design and Creative Center Kobe

=== Major staff ===
Chairman of the Committee

- Yasuki Hamano, 1996–2005
- Akira Kamiya, 2006–2015

Chairman of the examination

The examination was done mainly by a panel of chief editors of magazines covering anime, such as Newtype, Animedia and Animage. Usually, a city employee sent by Kobe City would also participate. The panel voted for one of its members to serve as chairman:

- Nobuo Oda, 1998 – chief editor of Animedia
- Susumu Asaka, 1999 – chief editor of CD-ROM Fan
- Toshihiro Fukuoka, 2000 – chief editor of Weekly Ascii
- Masahito Arinaga, 2001 – chief editor of a new magazine of MediaWorks
- Akitaro Daichi, 2002–2003 – animation director
- Kenji Yano, 2004 – chief editor of Newtype
- Yasushi Nakaji, 2006 – chief editor of Animedia
- Toshihiro Fukuoka, 2007 – chief editor of Weekly Ascii
- Isao Fujioka, 2008 – chairman of MdN Corporation

== Winners ==
The committee chooses most of the winners. Only the Animation Kobe Theme Song Award is chosen by fans' votes in the first selection, though the decision is by the committee. Therefore, the tendency of the prize winners is a little different from other prizes by the fans' vote. (See: Animage Grand Prix)

=== Individual Award ===
The activities from September of the previous year to August of the event year become objects for the examination. Newcomers expected to have future prominence are noted.

No.	Year	Winner	Notable work of the year
1	1996	Hideaki Anno	Director (Neon Genesis Evangelion)
2	1997	Hayao Miyazaki	Director (Princess Mononoke)
3	1998	Shinichi Watanabe	Director (Hare Tokidoki Buta)*
4	1999	Akitaro Daichi	Director (Ojarumaru, Jubei-chan)
5	2000	Hiroyuki Okiura	Director (Jin-Roh)*
6	2001	Hiroyuki Kitakubo	Director (Blood: The Last Vampire)
7	2002	Keiichi Hara	Director (Crayon Shin-chan television series and movie)
8	2003	Yōsuke Kuroda	Screenwriter (Ground Defense Force! Mao-chan, Please Twins!)
9	2004	Kenji Kamiyama	Director (Ghost in the Shell: S.A.C. 2nd GIG)
10	2005	Ken'ichi Yoshida	Animator (for the character design of Eureka Seven)
11	2006	Hiroshi Nagahama	Director (Mushishi)*
12	2007	Hiroyuki Imaishi	Director (Tengen Toppa Gurren Lagann)
13	2008	Mitsuo Iso	Director (Dennō Coil)*
14	2009	Kunio Katō	Director (La Maison en Petits Cubes)*
15	2010	Mamoru Hosoda	Director (Summer Wars)*
16	2011	Mari Okada	Screenwriter (Ano Hi Mita Hana no Namae o Bokutachi wa Mada Shiranai)
17	2012	Noriyasu Agematsu	Music producer, composer, lyricist (Senki Zesshō Symphogear)
18	2013	Tsutomu Mizushima	Director (Girls und Panzer)
19	2014	Seiji Kishi	Director (Hamatora: The Animation)
20	2015	Seiji Mizushima	Director (Expelled from Paradise)

* Watanabe, Okiura, Nagahama, Iso and Katō received the award for their first films as director.

=== Special Award ===
Awards for individual(s) or group that contributed to Japanese anime during a long period.

In the first year, the Yomiuri Award was posthumously given to Fujiko F. Fujio who died two months before the event.

No.	Year	Winner	Note
1	1996	Fujiko F. Fujio	Yomiuri Award. Manga artist: the creator of Doraemon etc.
2	1997	Masako Nozawa	Voice actor
3	1998	Yasuo Ōtsuka	Animator
4	1999	Takao Koyama	Screenwriter
5	2000	Shigeharu Shiba	Audio director
6	2001	Kunio Okawara	Mechanical designer
7	2002	Masao Maruyama	Producer (Madhouse)
8	2003	Leiji Matsumoto	Manga artist
9	2004	Shigeru Watanabe	Producer (Bandai Visual)
10	2005	Ippei Kuri (Toyoharu Yoshida)	A founder of Tatsunoko Production, awarded for his activities as general producer.
11	2006	Group TAC	Studio
11	2006	Nobuyo Ōyama; Noriko Ohara; Michiko Nomura; Kazuya Tatekabe; Kaneta Kimotsuki	Voice actors: main cast of Doraemon (1979–2005)
12	2007	Isao Takahata	Director (Studio Ghibli)
13	2008	Masaki Tsuji	Screenwriter
14	2009	Shun-ichi Yukimuro	Writer
15	2010	Studio Biho	Studio (anime background art)
16	2011	Osamu Dezaki	Director
16	2011	Detective Conan	Production Team
17	2012	Sanzigen	Studio (3DCG Animation)
18	2013	Shōji Kawamori	Director, mecha designer, vision creator
18	2013	Izumi Todo	Creative team
19	2014	Kyoto Animation	Studio

=== Theatrical Film Award ===
Animation films released in Japan from September of the previous year to August of the event year become candidates. The candidates are selected not only from Japan, but also from other countries. However, the committee sees more importance in a point of view promoting young creators of Japan.

No.	Year	Title	Studio	Director
1	1996	Ghost in the Shell	Production I.G	Mamoru Oshii
2	1997	Princess Mononoke	Studio Ghibli	Hayao Miyazaki
3	1998	Pokémon: Mewtwo Strikes Back	OLM	Kunihiko Yuyama
4	1999	Cardcaptor Sakura The Movie	Madhouse	Morio Asaka
5	2000	Cardcaptor Sakura The Movie 2: The Sealed Card	Madhouse	Morio Asaka
6	2001	Spirited Away	Studio Ghibli	Hayao Miyazaki
7	2002	The Cat Returns	Studio Ghibli	Hiroyuki Morita
8	2003	Millennium Actress	Madhouse	Satoshi Kon
9	2004	Ghost in the Shell 2: Innocence	Production I.G	Mamoru Oshii
10	2005	New Translation Zeta Gundam: Heirs to the Stars	Sunrise	Yoshiyuki Tomino
11	2006	The Girl Who Leapt Through Time	Madhouse	Mamoru Hosoda
12	2007	Paprika	Madhouse	Satoshi Kon
13	2008	Evangelion: 1.0 You Are (Not) Alone	Khara	Hideaki Anno
14	2009	WALL-E	Pixar	Andrew Stanton
15	2010	The Disappearance of Haruhi Suzumiya	Kyoto Animation	Yasuhiro Takemoto
16	2011	Macross Frontier: Sayonara no Tsubasa	Satelight	Shōji Kawamori
17	2012	K-On! The Movie	Kyoto Animation	Naoko Yamada
18	2013	The Garden of Words	Shinkai Creative, CoMix Wave Films	Makoto Shinkai
19	2014	Puella Magi Madoka Magica: Rebellion	Shaft	Akiyuki Shinbo; Yukihiro Miyamoto
20	2015	Ghost in the Shell: The New Movie	Production I.G	Kazuya Nomura

=== Television Award ===
The TV animations broadcast in Japan from September of the previous year to August of the event year, excluding rebroadcasts, become candidates. The candidates are selected not only from Japan but also from other countries. However, the committee sees more importance in a point of view promoting young creators of Japan.

No.	Year	Title	Studio	Director	Screenwriter
1	1996	Neon Genesis Evangelion	Gainax & Tatsunoko	Hideaki Anno	Hideaki Anno
2	1997	Revolutionary Girl Utena	J.C.Staff	Kunihiko Ikuhara	Yōji Enokido
3	1998	Cowboy Bebop	Sunrise	Shinichirō Watanabe	Keiko Nobumoto
4	1999	∀ Gundam	Sunrise	Yoshiyuki Tomino	Yoshiyuki Tomino
5	2000	Infinite Ryvius	Sunrise	Gorō Taniguchi	Yōsuke Kuroda
6	2001	Angelic Layer	Bones	Hiroshi Nishikiori	Ichirō Ōkouchi
7	2002	RahXephon	Bones	Yutaka Izubuchi	Chiaki J. Konaka
8	2003	Mobile Suit Gundam SEED	Sunrise	Mitsuo Fukuda	Yoshiyuki Tomino
9	2004	Fullmetal Alchemist	Bones	Seiji Mizushima	Shō Aikawa
10	2005	Gankutsuō: The Count of Monte Cristo	Gonzo	Mahiro Maeda	Natsuko Takahashi
11	2006	The Melancholy of Haruhi Suzumiya	Kyōto Animation	Tatsuya Ishihara	Yutaka Yamamoto
12	2007	Code Geass	Sunrise	Gorō Taniguchi	Ichirō Ōkouchi
13	2008	Code Geass R2	Sunrise	Gorō Taniguchi	Ichirō Ōkouchi
14	2009	Eden of the East	Production I.G	Kenji Kamiyama	Kenji Kamiyama
15	2010	K-On!!	Kyoto Animation	Naoko Yamada	Reiko Yoshida
16	2011	Puella Magi Madoka Magica	Shaft	Akiyuki Shinbo; Yukihiro Miyamoto	Gen Urobuchi
17	2012	YuruYuri	Dogakobo	Masahiko Ohta	Takashi Aoshima
18	2013	Attack on Titan	Wit Studio	Tetsurō Araki	Yasuko Kobayashi
19	2014	Love Live!	Sunrise	Takahiko Kyōgoku	Jukki Hanada
20	2015	Shirobako	P.A. Works	Tsutomu Mizushima	Michiko Yokote

=== Packaged Work Award ===
The packaged media distributed in Japan from September of the previous year to August of the event year become candidates. The candidates are selected not only from Japan but also from other countries. However, the committee sees more importance in a point of view promoting young creators of Japan.

No.	Year	Title	Developer / Anime Studio	Type
1	1996	Key the Metal Idol	Studio Pierrot	OVA
2	1997	Gundam Wing: Endless Waltz	Sunrise	OVA
3	1998	Sakura Taisen 2 ~Kimi, Shinitamou koto Nakare~	Sega	Video game (SS)
3	1998	Sakura Taisen: Ouka Kenran	RADIX	OVA
4	1999	Blue Submarine No. 6	GONZO	OVA
5	2000	Shenmue	Sega-AM2	Video game (SDC)
6	2001	Gran Turismo 3: A-Spec	Polyphony Digital	Video game (PS2)
7	2002	Voices of a Distant Star	Makoto Shinkai	Hand-made anime
8	2003	Sentō Yōsei Yukikaze	GONZO	OVA
9	2004	Haré+Guu FINAL	Bandai Visual	OVA
10	2005	Diebuster	Gainax	OVA
11	2006	The Wings of Rean	Sunrise	OVA
12	2007	Ghost in the Shell: Stand Alone Complex - Solid State Society	Production I.G	Television film

=== Network Award ===
Re-created in 2000 as Network Media Award, the anime-related media making the best use of interactive distribution in Japan from September of the previous year to August of the event year become candidates.

The word Network does not mean only Internet. The candidates are selected not only from Japan but also from other countries. However, the committee sees more importance in a point of view promoting young creators of Japan.

No.	Year	Title	Developer / Anime Studio	Type	Note
1	1996	Jungle Park	DIGITALOGUE	Video game (Sega Saturn)	Best Interactive Software Award
2	1997	Girlfriend of Steel	Gainax	Video game (Win95)	Best Interactive Software Award
	1998–1999	Not awarded			
5	2000	Pokémon Gold and Silver	Nintendo	Video game (GBC)	
6	2001	Phantasy Star Online	Sega	MMO (DC)	
7	2002	Final Fantasy XI	Square	MMO (PS2, MS Windows)	
8	2003	Grand-Ma	Cyberploc Studios	Digital animation	
9	2004	Ski Jumping Pairs	Riichiro Mashima	Hand-made digital animation	
10	2005	Mayutoro The Toons	XeNN STUDIOS	CG anime	
11	2006	Yawaraka Sensha (Soft Tank)	Rareko	Flash anime	
12	2007	Second Life	Linden Research, Inc.	Internet-based virtual world	
13	2008	Hatsune Miku	Crypton Future Media	Vocaloid character	
14	2009	Melancholy of Haruhi-chan Suzumiya Nyorōn Churuya-san	Kyoto Animation	Internet anime spin-off from the main Haruhi Suzumiya series	
15	2010	Miku no Nichi Kanshasai 39's Giving Day	Sega, Crypton Future Media		
16	2011	Hetalia: World Series	Studio Deen	Internet anime	
17	2012	Osawari Tantei: Nameko Saibai Kit (released in English as Mushroom Garden)	Beeworks	Spinoff game from the main Touch Detective series	

=== Theme Song Award ===
The theme songs of either anime or other forms of animated media distributed in Japan from September of the previous year to August of the event year become candidates. The voting by fans is counted, and the five songs with the highest number of votes become the candidates for the final competition. Especially, the committee sees more importance in original songs made for an anime, sung in the 'spirit' of the work.

Only the Theme Song Award is influenced by the fans. This format started from the 4th event. The total number of votes in a year is about 10,000 votes. The result of the vote is also announced on the official sites of Radio Kansai, Anitama.com and the programs of Radio Kansai before the event. Though this is a preliminary vote to reduce the candidates to final, as of 2013, the candidates chosen in first by the vote have always won the award.

No.	Year	Award	Song name	Associated work	Singer(s)	Note
No.	Year	Award	Song name	Associated work	Composer	Note
1	1996	Best Theme Song	Yuzurenai Negai	Magic Knight Rayearth	Naomi Tamura	
2	1997	Best Music Composing	Neon Genesis Evangelion soundtracks 1–3	Neon Genesis Evangelion	Shirō Sagisu	
	1998	Not awarded				
4	1999	AM Kobe Award	"Ojamajo Carnival!"	Ojamajo Doremi	Mahōdō	vote: 1st, with 288 of 8,545 votes
4	1999	AM Kobe Award	"Ojamajo Carnival!"	Ojamajo Doremi	Takeshi Ike	vote: 1st, with 288 of 8,545 votes
5	2000	AM Kobe Award	"We Are!"	One Piece	Hiroshi Kitadani	vote: 1st, with 875 of 13,988 votes
5	2000	AM Kobe Award	"We Are!"	One Piece	Kōhei Tanaka	vote: 1st, with 875 of 13,988 votes
6	2001	AM Kobe Award	"W-Infinity"	Gear Fighter Dendoh	Hitomi Mieno with Hironobu Kageyama	vote: 1st, with 1,182 of 10,298 votes
6	2001	AM Kobe Award	"W-Infinity"	Gear Fighter Dendoh	Little Voice	vote: 1st, with 1,182 of 10,298 votes
7	2002	AM Kobe Award	"For Fruits Basket"	Fruits Basket	Ritsuko Okazaki	vote: 1st, with 1,155 of 10,054 votes
8	2003	AM Kobe Award	"Asu e no brilliant road"	Stellvia of the Universe	angela	vote: 1st, with 1,209 of 11,590 votes
8	2003	AM Kobe Award	"Asu e no brilliant road"	Stellvia of the Universe	atsuko	vote: 1st, with 1,209 of 11,590 votes
9	2004	Radio Kansai Award	"DANZEN! Futari wa Pretty Cure"	Futari wa Pretty Cure	Mayumi Gojo	vote: 1st, with 1,276 of 8,254 votes
9	2004	Radio Kansai Award	"DANZEN! Futari wa Pretty Cure"	Futari wa Pretty Cure	Yasuo Kosugi	vote: 1st, with 1,276 of 8,254 votes
10	2005	Radio Kansai Award	"Happy☆Material"	Negima!: Magister Negi Magi	Mahora Gakuen Chyuutoubu 2-A	vote: 1st, with 753 of 9,920 votes
10	2005	Radio Kansai Award	"Happy☆Material"	Negima!: Magister Negi Magi	Shigenobu Ōkawa	vote: 1st, with 753 of 9,920 votes
11	2006	Radio Kansai Award	"Hare Hare Yukai"	The Melancholy of Haruhi Suzumiya	Aya Hirano, Minori Chihara & Yūko Gotō	vote: 1st, with 2,095 of 7,450 votes
11	2006	Radio Kansai Award	"Hare Hare Yukai"	The Melancholy of Haruhi Suzumiya	Tomokazu Tashiro	vote: 1st, with 2,095 of 7,450 votes
12	2007	Radio Kansai Award	"Motteke! Sailor Fuku"	Lucky ☆ Star	Aya Hirano, Emiri Katō, Kaori Fukuhara & Aya Endo	vote: 1st, with 2,017 of 8,105 votes
12	2007	Radio Kansai Award	"Motteke! Sailor Fuku"	Lucky ☆ Star	Satoru Kōsaki	vote: 1st, with 2,017 of 8,105 votes
13	2008	Radio Kansai Award	"Triangler"	Macross Frontier	Maaya Sakamoto	-
13	2008	Radio Kansai Award	"Triangler"	Macross Frontier	Yoko Kanno	-
14	2009	Radio Kansai Award	"Don't say 'lazy'"	K-ON!	Aki Toyosaki, Yōko Hikasa, Satomi Satō & Minako Kotobuki	-
14	2009	Radio Kansai Award	"Don't say 'lazy'"	K-ON!	Hiroyuki Maezawa	-
15	2010	Radio Kansai Award	"only my railgun"	A Certain Scientific Railgun	fripSide	-
15	2010	Radio Kansai Award	"only my railgun"	A Certain Scientific Railgun	Satoshi Yaginuma	-
16	2011	Radio Kansai Award	"Shinryaku no Susume☆"	Shinryaku! Ika Musume!	ULTRA-PRISM with Hisako Kanemoto	-
16	2011	Radio Kansai Award	"Shinryaku no Susume☆"	Shinryaku! Ika Musume!	Masaya Koike	-
17	2012	Radio Kansai Award	"Taiyō Iwaku Moe yo Chaos"	Haiyore! Nyaruko-san	Kana Asumi, Miyu Matsuki and Yuka Ōtsubo	-
17	2012	Radio Kansai Award	"Taiyō Iwaku Moe yo Chaos"	Haiyore! Nyaruko-san	Hidekazu Tanaka	-
18	2013	Radio Kansai Award	"Guren no Yumiya"	Attack on Titan	Linked Horizon	-
18	2013	Radio Kansai Award	"Guren no Yumiya"	Attack on Titan	Revo	-
19	2014	Radio Kansai Award	"Sidonia"	Knights of Sidonia	angela	-
19	2014	Radio Kansai Award	"Sidonia"	Knights of Sidonia	atsuko & KATSU	-
20	2015	Radio Kansai Award	"JoJo, Sono Chi no Kioku ~end of THE WORLD~"	JoJo's Bizarre Adventure: Stardust Crusaders	JO☆STARS ~TOMMY,Coda,JIN~	-
20	2015	Radio Kansai Award	"JoJo, Sono Chi no Kioku ~end of THE WORLD~"	JoJo's Bizarre Adventure: Stardust Crusaders	-	-

== See also ==
- List of animation awards
- Lists of animated feature films
- BAFTA Award for Best Animated Film
- Annie Award for Best Animated Feature
- Golden Globe Award for Best Animated Feature Film
- Critics' Choice Movie Award for Best Animated Feature
- Annie Award for Best Animated Feature — Independent
- Saturn Award for Best Animated Film
- Japan Media Arts Festival
- Tokyo Anime Award
