= Kensuke =

- Gender: Male

Origin
- Origin: Japanese
- Meaning: Different meanings depending on the kanji used

Kensuke (written: 健介, 健輔, 謙介, 謙佑, 建介, 賢介, 賢輔 or 賢典) is a masculine Japanese given name. Notable people with the name include:

- Kensuke Fukuda (福田 健介; born 1984), Japanese footballer
- Kensuke Hijikata (土方 健介; born 1922), Japanese photographer
- Kensuke Iwabuchi (岩渕 健輔; born 1975), Japanese rugby union player and coach
- Kensuke Kagami (加賀見 健介; born 1974), Japanese footballer
- Kensuke Kazama (風間 健介; born 1960), Japanese photographer
- Kensuke Kita (喜多 建介; born 1977), Japanese musician
- Kensuke Kitahama (北浜 健介; born 1975), Japanese shogi player
- Kensuke Koike (小池 健輔; born 1980), Japanese artist
- Kensuke Kondo (近藤 健介; born 1993), Japanese professional baseball player
- Kensuke Mitsuda (光田 健輔; 1876–1964), Japanese physician
- Kensuke Nagai (永井 謙佑; born 1989), Japanese footballer
- Kensuke Nakaniwa (中庭 健介; born 1981), Japanese figure skater
- Kensuke Nebiki (根引 謙介; born 1977), Japanese footballer
- Kensuke Sasaki (佐々木 健介; born 1966), Japanese professional wrestler
- Kensuke Sato (佐藤 謙介; born 1989), Japanese footballer
- Kensuke Shiina, Japanese DJ and musician
- Kensuke Takezawa (竹澤 健介; born 1986), Japanese long-distance runner
- Kensuke Tanabe (田邊 賢輔; born 1963), Japanese video game designer and producer
- Kensuke Tanaka (田中 賢介; born 1981), Japanese baseball player
- Kensuke Tsukuda (佃 賢典; born 1977), Japanese footballer
- Kensuke Uchimura (内村 賢介; born 1986), Japanese baseball player
- Kensuke Ushio (born 1983), Japanese musician and composer, notably of the scoreboard for the movie A Silent Voice
