= Akane Omae =

Japanese voice actress (born 1982)

- 大前 茜
- Born: August 21, 1982 (age 44); Saitama Prefecture, Japan
- Occupation: Voice actress
- Years active: 1999–2010
- Agent: Ken Production
- Notable credits: The Legend of Zelda: Spirit Tracks as Princess Zelda; Suikoden Tactics as Corselia; Azumanga Daioh as Chihiro and Miruchi; The Melancholy of Haruhi Suzumiya as Sonou Mori; Negima! Magister Negi Magi as Sakurako Shiina; Trotting Hamtaro as Lazuli; Yakitate!! Japan as Kaede Matsushiro; Super Heavyweight God Gravion as Cecil; I My Me! Strawberry Eggs as Akane Kuise
- Website: Official profile

Akane Omae (大前 茜, Ōmae Akane; born August 21, 1982) is a former Japanese voice actress from Saitama Prefecture. Formerly affiliated with Ken Production, she retired from voice acting in 2010.

She is known for her voice roles as Princess Zelda in The Legend of Zelda: Spirit Tracks, Dorothy in The Sword of Etheria, Corselia in Suikoden Tactics, Chihiro and Miruchi in Azumanga Daioh, Sonou Mori in The Melancholy of Haruhi Suzumiya, Sakurako Shiina in Negima! Magister Negi Magi, Lazuli in Trotting Hamtaro, Kaede Matsushiro in Yakitate!! Japan, Cecil in Super Heavyweight God Gravion, and Akane Kuise in I My Me! Strawberry Eggs.

== Biography ==
Omae was born in Japan in Saitama Prefecture on August 21, 1982.

In 1999, she won the Grand Prix on the "Voice Actor Star Tanjo" segment of the Fuji TV program Kaishingeki TV! Utae-mon. That same year, she made her debut as Yoko in Chibi Maruko-chan, and after voicing minor character roles in One Piece, made her full-scale debut as a voice actress in 2001.

In 2004, she was cast as the voice of the Ham-Ham Lazuli in the popular children's television anime Trotting Hamtaro.

On November 1, 2010, Omae announced on her blog that she had officially retired at the end of October, stating that her retirement was due to a personal desire to experience a different career.

== Personal life ==
She has an expert-level knowledge of crow ecology and her hobbies and special skills include creating illustrations.

== Filmography ==
=== Television animation ===
List of voice performances in television animation
Year	Title	Role	Notes	Source
1999	Chibi Maruko-chan	Yoko		
1999	One Piece	Woman	Ep. 3	
2001	I My Me! Strawberry Eggs	Akane Kuise		
2001	Steel Angel Kurumi 2	Junior, Student		
2001	Let's Go Quintuplets!	Girl		
2001	The Jungle Was Always Sunny, Then Came Guu	Woman		
2001	Weekly Storyland	Elementary School Girl		
2001	The First Step	Tourist		
2002	PaRappa the Rapper	Baby Bird	Ep. 30	
2002	Azumanga Daioh	Chihiro, Tennis Girl, Miruchi, Female Student B	Tennis Girl in Ep. 10, Miruchi in Ep. 12, Female Student B in Ep. 19	
2002	Super Heavyweight God Gravion	Cecil, Maintenance Maid A	Maintenance Maid A in Ep. 12	
2002	Kiddy Grade	Broadcaster, Female Student 2, Wife, Child 1, Crying Little Girl, Calming Mother, Information Girl, Distraught Grandson, Fleur	Female Student 2 in Ep. 1, Wife in Ep. 2, Child 1 in Ep. 4, Crying Little Girl in Ep. 5, Calming Mother in Ep. 6, Information Girl in Ep. 8, Distraught Grandson in Ep. 10, Fleur in Ep. 24	
2002	Shrine of the Morning Mist	Young Girl	Ep. 22	
2003	Kaleido Star	Annie, Andy		
2004–06	Trotting Hamtaro	Lazuli		
2004	Super Heavyweight God Gravion Zwei	Cecil		
2004	Yakitate!! Japan	Kaede Matsushiro		
2005	Negima! Magister Negi Magi	Sakurako Shiina		
2005	Atashin'chi	Friend A, Child A, Staff, Announcer, Karin		
2005	Cluster Edge	Children, Young Girl		
2005	Crayon Shin-chan	Preschooler A, Tea Ceremony Member B, Girl, Little Girl B, Female Staff Member, Child, Minami, Haruka	Tea Ceremony Member B in Ep. 554	
2005	Kotencotenco	Pick		
2005	Wagamama Fairy: Mirumo de Pon!	Yurin		
2006	The Melancholy of Haruhi Suzumiya	Sonou Mori	Debuts in Ep. 6	
2006	War Fairy Tales	Misako	Ep. 5	
2006	Negima!?	Sakurako Shiina	Was also in charge of the subtitle calligraphy's third image in Ep. 16 and the sponsor screen illustration after the ED	
2007	Kirarin Revolution	Yuka		
2007	Kekkaishi	Matsudo's servant		
2008	Shigofumi	Miku Ayase		
2009	Shugo Chara!! Doki	Girl, Cecil	Girl in Ep. 72, Cecil in Eps 85-86	
2009	Gokyōdai Monogatari	Tomo	Ep. 4	

=== Theatrical animation ===
List of voice performances in theatrical animation
Year	Title	Role	Source
2004	Trotting Hamtaro: The Mysterious Oni Picture Book Tower	Lazuli	

=== Original video animation (OVA) ===
List of voice performances in original video animation
Year	Title	Role	Notes	Source
2005	Shigeru Mizuki's Yokai World: Osorezan Story	Sayuri		
2006	Negima!? Magister Negi Magi: Spring	Sakurako Shiina		
2006	Negima!? Magister Negi Magi: Summer	Sakurako Shiina		
2007	Yatta ze! Nattou Boy	Edamame Peanuts		
2008	Mahō Sensei Negima!: Shiroki Tsubasa Ala Alba	Sakurako Shiina		
2009	Mahō Sensei Negima!: Mō Hitotsu no Sekai	Sakurako Shiina		

=== Video games ===
List of voice performances in video games
Year	Title	Role	Source
2002	My Merry May	Motomi Agatsuma	
2002	Erde: Under the Juniper Tree	Riou	
2004	Lupin the 3rd: The Legacy of Columbus's Inheritance	Orphanage Girl	
2005	The Sword of Etheria	Dorothy	
2007	Imabikisō	Minagawa Kaori	
2009	The Legend of Zelda: Spirit Tracks	Princess Zelda	

=== Dubbing ===
==== Films ====
List of dub performances in overseas films
Title	Role	Notes	Source
Babe: Pig in the City			
Dennis the Menace			
Nim's Island	Nim (Abigail Breslin)		
Reservation Road	Emma Learner (Elle Fanning)		
Sympathy for Mr. Vengeance	Yu-sun (Han Bo-bae)		

==== Television dramas ====
List of dub performances in overseas television dramas
Title	Role	Notes	Source
Life with Derek	Marti Venturi (Ariel Waller)		
The Adventures of Animal Rescue Kids	Carrie		

==== Animation ====
List of dub performances in overseas animation
Title	Role	Notes	Source
101 Dalmatians II: Patch's London Adventure			
Hercules			

- Joan of Arc (Child Jeanne)

=== Drama CDs ===
List of drama CD performances
Year	Title	Role	Label	Catalogue number	Source
	I My Me! Strawberry Eggs	Akane Kuise			
