= Yumi Shimura =

Japanese voice actress

Yumi Shimura (志村 由美, Shimura Yumi; born November 30, 1982) is a Japanese voice actress from Yamanashi Prefecture. She is employed by the talent management firm I'm Enterprise.

As of June 30, 2016, she has retired from voice acting.

== Filmography ==
=== Anime ===
- Gundam Seed Destiny (2004 TV series), Athrun Zala (child)
- Mahō Sensei Negima! (2004 TV special), Chisame Hasegawa
- Rozen Maiden: Träumend (2005 TV series), Kanaria
- Negima! (2005 TV series), Chisame Hasegawa, Theme Song Performance (OP5, OP8, ED4)
- Mahō Sensei Negima! OVA Haru (2006 OVA), Chisame Hasegawa
- Negima!? (2006 TV series), Chisame Hasegawa, Theme Song Performance (ED9)
- Mahō Sensei Negima! OVA Natsu (2006 OVA), Chisame Hasegawa
- Rozen Maiden: Ouvertüre (2006 TV special), Kanaria
- Mushi-Uta (2007 TV series), Asami Minagawa
- Clannad (2007 TV series), Female student (ep 1), Customer (ep 8), Boy (ep 19)
- Noramimi (2008 TV series), Kamechobi (eps 3, 4, 10)
- Mahō Sensei Negima! ~Shiroki Tsubasa Ala Alba~ (2008 OVA) Chisame Hasegawa
- Clannad After Story (2008 TV series), Student (ep 23)
- Mahō Sensei Negima! ~Mō Hitotsu no Sekai~ (2009 OVA), Chisame Hasegawa, Theme Song Performance
- Cuticle Detective Inaba (2013 TV series), Wakaba Ogino
- Rozen Maiden: Zurückspulen (2013 TV series), Kanaria

=== Video games ===
- Arcana Heart (2005), Saki Tsuzura
- Ar tonelico II: Melody of Metafalica (2007), Cocona Bartel
- Arcana Heart 2 (2007), Saki Tsuzura
- Arcana Heart 3 (2009), Saki Tsuzura
- Ar tonelico III: Sekai Shūen no Hikigane wa Shōjo no Uta ga Hajiku (2010) Cocona Bartel
- CR Mahō Sensei Negima! (2017), Chisame Hasegawa
