= Hijikata =

Hijikata (written: 土方) is a Japanese surname, and may refer to:

- Hisaakira Hijikata (1870–1942), Japanese businessman
- Kensuke Hijikata (born 1922), Japanese photographer
- Rinky Hijikata (born 2001), Australian tennis player
- Ryuji Hijikata (born 1978), Japanese professional wrestler
- Tatsumi Hijikata (1928–1986), Japanese choreographer
- Yoshi Hijikata (1898–1959), Japanese theatre director
- Hijikata Hisamoto (1833–1918), Japanese politician
- Hijikata Katsunaga (1851–1884), Japanese daimyō of the late Edo period
- Hijikata Toshizō (1835–1869), deputy leader of the Shinsengumi
