= Cuticle Detective Inaba =

Japanese manga series

- First tankōbon volume cover

キューティクル探偵因幡
- Genre: Adventure, comedy, supernatural
- Manga
- Written by: Mochi
- Published by: Square Enix
- Magazine: Monthly GFantasy
- Original run: August 18, 2007 – January 18, 2017
- Volumes: 19
- Anime television series
- Directed by: Susumu Nitsukawa
- Produced by: Fumiki Yamazaki; Kazuya Takahashi; Ken'ichi Yamaguchi; Makoto Nakamura; Noritomo Isogai; Shinsaku Tanaka
- Written by: Makoto Nakamura
- Studio: Zexcs
- Licensed by: NA: Sentai Filmworks
- Original network: AT-X, BS11 Digital, Sun TV, Tokyo MX
- Original run: January 4, 2013 – March 22, 2013
- Episodes: 12 (27 segments)

Cuticle Detective Inaba (Japanese: キューティクル探偵因幡, Hepburn: Kyūtikuru Tantei Inaba) is a Japanese manga series written and illustrated by Mochi. It was serialized in Square Enix's Monthly GFantasy from August 2007 to January 2017, with its chapters collected in 19 tankōbon volumes. A 12-episode anime television series adaptation produced by Zexcs was broadcast from January to March 2013.

== Plot ==
The story revolves around Hiroshi Inaba, a genetically altered part human and part wolf being. Inaba is also a private detective, who runs his agency with the help of his cross-dressing secretary, Yuuta and his "mostly normal" teenager assistant Kei. The plot mostly centers around the gang trying to arrest Don Valentino, an evil goat who eats money.

== Characters ==
=== Detective Inaba Office ===
Hiroshi Inaba (因幡 洋, Inaba Hiroshi)
Voiced by: Tomokazu Seki (drama CD), Junichi Suwabe (anime, present), Natsumi Takamori (anime, young)
A genetically altered being made from the spliced genes of human and wolf, he is also a private detective. He gains information by examining and tasting people's hair. As a result from this, he has a hair fetish. Hiroshi can also transform into a more wolf-like form and can use special powers and attacks from whatever type or color of hair he eats. Just like Sōmei he can transform into a wolf, him being red. Formerly, he worked for the police but quit and formed his own detective agency after his younger brother, Haruka, left. His former partner is Kuniharu Ogino. He still continues to help him in cases, ones that involve the Valentino Family. It is stated and shown throughout the series that he has a brother complex towards his younger brother. He spoils Haruka because of his weak body and is often blind to his usual villainous aura. His biological father is Sōmei, as his half-wolf DNA is originally from Sōmei.
Kei Nozaki (野崎 圭, Nozaki Kei)
Voiced by: Shinnosuke Tachibana (drama CD), Miyu Irino (anime)
A 16-year-old boy who is also an assistant to Inaba. He is the "mostly normal" and the straight man of the agency. It is mentioned that he was very poor growing up, once residing in a small wooden house with his parents. Even with Hiroshi paying him 900¥ per-hour, he is still plagued by money problems. He is a cat lover, but has a cat allergy, making him only able to own Spynx because the cat doesn't have fur. Kei is also able to release incredible willpower, although only given decent motivation. Examples of this would be expelling the "Black Fang" from his body due to his addiction to cats and the ability to exponentially improve his table tennis skills when angered by the Don's foolishness. He is usually the one who is caught up with Yūta's plots to kill Kuniharu Ogino and even Haruka Inaba for getting to close to Hiroshi. Mostly he does his best to stop Yūta from killing anyone that gets to close with Hiroshi. He's in his freshman year at a nearby high school.
Yūta Sasaki (佐々木 優太, Sasaki Yūta)
Voiced by: Chiwa Saitō (drama CD), Asami Shimoda (anime)
A cross-dressing young boy who serves as Inaba's secretary. He hates Ogino to the point of wanting to kill him. Yūta pretends to be the stereotypical cute anime girl. However to everyone that he dislikes or views as an enemy, for time with Hiroshi, he shows his sadistic side. This is especially true as he wants to kill Kuniharu Ogino, Hiroshi's past partner. This is due to Yūta jealousy of Ogino and Hiroshi's relationship of mutual trust. He is only affectionate and shows protectiveness over Hiroshi but Hiroshi does not realize this or may just be choosing to ignore it, as Hiroshi treats Yūta as his little sister. He later shows protectiveness over Noah. Yūta and Noah instantly bonded over their similar personalities and mutual desire to kill Ogino. Despite technically being enemies, Yūta and Noah remain to be enthusiastic in each other's company and are shown to text frequently. Yūta is proficient in martial arts. It is implied that Yūta has a crush on Hiroshi and later Noah.

=== Police Officer ===
Kuniharu Ogino (荻野 邦治, Ogino Kuniharu)
Voiced by: Hiroki Tōchi (drama CD), Toshiyuki Morikawa (anime)
A top inspector with the police force. He was partnered with Inaba, back when he was with the police. He is still good friends with Inaba and usually seeks their assistance in several cases. He has a daughter named Azusa he overprotective with and willing to do anything just to see her cuteness, just as when he conquered a giant goat so he can take a picture of it with Azusa.
Yuzuki Ogata (緒方 柚樹, Ogata Yuzuki)
Voiced by: Ryōtarō Okiayu (drama CD), Kōsuke Toriumi (anime)
A detective known to solve cases quickly. He used to dote on Inaba due to his extreme love for dogs, which makes Inaba prone to stay away. When Inaba was still with the police force, together with most of the police dogs, would often go to strike due to his annoying attitude towards them.
Stella (ステラ, Sutera)
Voiced by: Ayana Taketatsu (drama CD), Ai Fukada (anime)
From the same agency as Inaba, Stella is also a wolf/human hybrid and appears to be a young teenage girl. Paired with Ogata, she gains a taste for flesh elasticity during her first outing in the field. She has a misunderstanding with Ogino for being a bad man because of his relationship with Ogata.

=== Mafia Valentino Family ===
Don Valentino (首領 ヴァレンティーノ, Don Baarentiino)
Voiced by: Shigeru Chiba (drama CD), Tōru Ōkawa (anime)
A goat who is known for being head of a mafia, making counterfeiting bills, while collecting real ones to eat. He hates wolves in general because of the affairs in the past of two creatures.
Lorenzo (ロレンツォ, Rorenzō)
Voiced by: Masashi Ebara (drama CD), Jūrōta Kosugi (anime)
The assistant to Don Valentino. Wears old Japanese clothes and a burlap sack on his head. He really protective with Don in the point he might be in love with him. When Lorenzo is not wearing his mask he has short wavy brown hair, dark green eyes, and even sports a five o'clock shadow.
Gabriella (ガブリエラ, Gaburiera)
Voiced by: Yuko Kaida (drama CD), Yōko Hikasa (anime)
A hitwoman employed by Valentino with a size fetish. She becomes infatuated with Kei as he's her ideal minion size.
Noah (ノア, Noa)
Voiced by: Yuki Matsuoka (drama CD), Yuiko Tatsumi (anime)
A 14 years old mad scientist, Noah makes all of the Don's gadgets, potions, and monsters. Noah speaks in Kansai dialect. She has a fetish for youthful bodies and capturing their perfection in death. Finding Ogi to be an ideal specimen, Noah befriends Yuta as they both aspire to his demise.

=== NORA ===
Haruka Inaba (因幡 遥, Inaba Haruka)
Voiced by: Junko Minagawa (drama CD), Mitsuki Saiga (anime)
Hiroshi's younger brother who disappeared two years ago With Jose. He has white hair and red eyes and is often said to look like a white rabbit. Despite him being a terrorist, he is still attached to his brother. He too has a brother complex towards his brother. To the point where he want to destroy the Japanese police department because it takes too much of his brother's time. He has a weak body and is very lazy, stating that he is a pro at being lazy. Haruka refers to Hiroshi as "Nii-ni" and apparently can't look at red things without seeing his brother. He is the 'head' of NORA. It is hinted that besides wanting to destroy the police, so that his brother will not ever chose them over him, that he has another reason for being in NORA. His power is the ability to hear a person's thoughts, including their most inner thoughts [including those you did not even know you had]. He too is said be able to transform into a wolf, just like Sōmei and Hiroshi but usually the transformation only drains his energy.
Sōmei Inaba (聡明さん)
Voiced by: Takehito Koyasu
Sōmei was a former police dog, known as the "Black Fang", who was arrested over the suicide of his partner, Joji. They spent 18 years working together. He remembers Joji as a man who 'yelled a lot'. He now mainly resides in a sheep-sized doll, as the unofficial head of NORA. Due to a special power of his he was able to leave his body and began to take numerous hosts. His current host is sometimes Yatarō, who was personally trained for such a task. Sōmei is the biological father of both Hiroshi Inaba and Haruka Inaba. The old lot left following Sōmei's arrest. Sōmei is fairly perverted, often trying to molest Natsuki. He is also laid-back, but can be as a diabolic, as seen when he plans to kill Ogino, who he knows to be the grandson of Joji, despite the latter having made no offense. He is currently looking for his body. His wolf/human hybrid ability is to be able to tell if a person is lying just by their scent.
Natsuki (夏輝)
Voiced by: Kanae Oki (drama CD), Asami Seto (anime)
The only female member of NORA. She is a wolf/human hybrid, with the ability to read a person's mind just by holding their hand. Natsuki and Yatarō are childhood friends. She worries for Haruka because of his weak body, and Yatarō when Soumei possesses him. She has feelings for Yatarō, as shown when she became jealous during his date with Noah.
Yataro Shinozuka (弥太郎)
Voiced by: Takahiro Sakurai (drama CD), Tomokazu Sugita (anime)
He is a wolf/human hybrid who is a member of NORA. He was personally trained by Sōmei to be his host. Like Soumei, he has the ability to tell if a person is lying just by their scent, a power which also extends to objects. Because he is Sōmei's body host, he doesn't speak much. Yatarō and Natsuki are childhood friends. It is hinted that he returns Natsuki's feelings.
Akiyoshi (秋吉)
Voiced by: Shintaro Asanuma (anime)
Akiyoshi is Sōmei's former vessel before Yatarō. He is now imprisoned in non-human prison.

=== Others ===
Iori Hamada (浜田 庵, Hamada Iori)
Voiced by: Hiroki Takahashi (drama CD), Satoshi Hino (anime)
Iori is a bartender who works in a bar called Ragdoll. He is also Kei's roommate.
Torayasu Kurami (蔵見 虎泰, Kurami Torayasu)
Voiced by: Kenji Hamada (drama CD), Ryōta Takeuchi (anime)
Masashi Mori (森 マサシ, Mori Masashi)
Voiced by: Jun Fukuyama (anime)
A mysterious character that appeared in the last episode. He calls himself "Forest Masashi".
Azusa Ogino (荻野 アズサ, Ogino Azusa)
Voiced by: Rina Hidaka (anime)
Kunihiro's five year old daughter. She is shown to be quite the dynamic type, being able to drag Inaba off his feet as she runs around with a leash. She also enjoys playing games, though often to the extreme.
Wakaba Ogino (荻野 ワカバ, Ogino Wakaba)
Voiced by: Yumi Shimura (anime)
Kunihiro's wife and Azusa's mother. She is very kind and calm, easily suppressing the Don's rage, but accidentally gaining the dislike of Lorenzo. She shows that she is not bothered by her husband's lack of affection, and continues to try to get him to be affectionate shown when she tries to get a kiss from him in episode 2. According to her husband, she is said to have no sense of danger much to his worry.

== Media ==
=== Manga ===
Written and illustrated by Mochi, Cuticle Detective Inaba was serialized in Square Enix's shōnen manga magazine Monthly GFantasy from August 18, 2007, to January 18, 2017. A special chapter was published in the magazine on March 18, 2017. Square Enix collected its chapters in nineteen tankōbon volumes, released from March 27, 2008, to June 27, 2017.

In October 2015, the series was added to Crunchyroll Manga.

=== Anime ===
A 12-episode anime television series adaptation produced by Zexcs was broadcast on AT-X from January 4 to March 22, 2013. The opening theme is "Far Away, In the Everydays" (遥か、日常の中で, Haruka, Nichijō no Naka de) by Junichi Suwabe, while the ending theme is "Prima Stella" (プリマ・ステラ, Purima Sutera) by Tōru Ōkawa.

==== Episodes ====
No.	Title	Original release date
1a	"Counterfeit Currency Printing Incident"; Transliteration: "Gizō Tsūka Insatsu Jiken" (Japanese: 偽造通貨印刷事件)	January 4, 2013
1b	"Inaba Hiroshi Kidnapping Incident"; Transliteration: "Inaba Hiroshi Yūkai Jiken" (Japanese: 因幡洋誘拐事件)	January 4, 2013
2a	"The Secret Documents Robbery Case"; Transliteration: "Kimitsu Bunsho Tōnan Jiken" (Japanese: 機密文書盗難事件)	January 11, 2013
2b	"Mother and Child Stalker Case"; Transliteration: "Boshi Sutōkā Jiken" (Japanese: 母子ストーカー事件)	January 11, 2013
3a	"The Chocolate Enchantment Case"; Transliteration: "Chokorēto Nōsatsu Jiken" (Japanese: チョコレート悩殺事件)	January 18, 2013
3b	"The Wolf Girl Assassination Case"; Transliteration: "Ōkami Shōjo Ansatsu Jiken" (Japanese: 狼少女暗殺事件)	January 18, 2013
4a	"Uniformed Police Officer Raid Incident"; Transliteration: "Seifuku Keikan Shūgeki Jiken" (Japanese: 制服警官襲撃事件)	January 25, 2013
4b	"Cat Lover Enchantment Case"; Transliteration: "Neko Baka Sennō Jiken" (Japanese: 猫バカ洗脳事件)	January 25, 2013
5a	"The Genius Tag Team Case"; Transliteration: "Tensai Taggu Kessoku Jiken" (Japanese: 天才タッグ結束事件)	February 1, 2013
5b	"The Pleasure Trip Paradise Case"; Transliteration: "Ian Ryokō Gokuraku Jiken" (Japanese: 慰安旅行極楽事件)	February 1, 2013
6a	"The Mastermind Black Fang Arrival Case"; Transliteration: "Kuromaku Kuroi Kiba Tōrai Jiken" (Japanese: 黒幕黒い牙到来事件)	February 8, 2013
6b	"Extra: 5/27"; Transliteration: "Gaiden: 5/27" (Japanese: 外伝:5/27)	February 8, 2013
6c	"Extra: The Wolf's House"; Transliteration: "Gaiden: Ōkami no Ie" (Japanese: 外伝:オオカミの家)	February 8, 2013
7a	"Extra: Acceptance Into Hair Cuticle Academy"; Transliteration: "Gaiden: Keritsu Kyūtikuru Gakuen Nyūgaku" (Japanese: 外伝: 毛立キューティクル学園入学)	February 15, 2013
7b	"Cuticle Life: The Idiot Sons, 13 Years Ago"; Transliteration: "Kyūtikuru Life 13 Nenmae no Baka Musuko" (Japanese: キューティクルLIFE 13年前の馬鹿息子)	February 15, 2013
7c	"Extra: Bar Ragdoll"; Transliteration: "Gaiden: Bā Ragudōru" (Japanese: 外伝: バー・ラグドール)	February 15, 2013
7d	"Cuticle Life: The Idiot Sons, 10 Years Ago"; Transliteration: "Kyūtikuru Life 10 Nenmae no Baka Musuko" (Japanese: キューティクルLIFE 10年前の馬鹿息子)	February 15, 2013
7e	"Boss Kujō's Assassination Case"; Transliteration: "Kujōgumi Kumichō Ansatsu Jiken" (Japanese: 九条組組長暗殺事件)	February 15, 2013
8a	"Yūta Sasaki Kidnapping Case"; Transliteration: "Sasaki Yūta Yūkai Jiken" (Japanese: 佐々木優太誘拐事件)	February 22, 2013
8b	"Inaba Family Breakdown Case, Part 1"; Transliteration: "Inaba Oyako Ketsuretsu Jiken (Zenpen)" (Japanese: 因幡親子決裂事件(前編))	February 22, 2013
9a	"Inaba Family Breakdown Case, Part 2"; Transliteration: "Inaba Oyako Ketsuretsu Jiken (Kōhen)" (Japanese: 因幡親子決裂事件(後編))	March 1, 2013
9b	"Love Flag Jumble Case"; Transliteration: "Renai Furagu Ranritsu Jiken" (Japanese: 恋愛フラグ乱立事件)	March 1, 2013
10a	"Goat Park Revelry Case"; Transliteration: "Yagien Mankitsu Jiken" (Japanese: ヤギ園満喫事件)	March 8, 2013
10b	"Don Power Spot Conspiracy Case"; Transliteration: "Shuryō Pawā Supotto Inbō Jiken" (Japanese: 首領パワースポット陰謀事件)	March 8, 2013
11	"Don Valentino Jailbreak Case"; Transliteration: "Shuryō Varentīno Datsugoku Jiken" (Japanese: 首領ヴァレンティーノ脱獄事件)	March 15, 2013
12a	"The Cuticle Phantom Thief Appears Case"; Transliteration: "Kyūtikuru Kaitō Tanjō Jiken" (Japanese: キューティクル怪盗誕生事件)	March 22, 2013
12b	"Evil Organization Expansion Case"; Transliteration: "Aku no Soshiki Kakudai Jiken" (Japanese: 悪の組織拡大事件)	March 22, 2013
