= Madoka Kimura =

Japanese voice actress and singer (born 1980)

Madoka Kimura (木村まどか, Kimura Madoka; born January 28, 1980 in Fukushima) is a Japanese voice actress and singer.

== Notable filmography ==
- Kimie Sugawara in Otome wa Boku ni Koishiteru
- Yuuna Akashi in Negima!
- Miki Tachibana in Night Head Genesis
- Sana Hidaka (childhood) in Myself ; Yourself
- Singing voice of Latias in Pokémon Heroes
