= Negiho =

Japanese manga

- Manga cover

ネギほ
- Manga
- Written by: Yui
- Published by: Kodansha
- English publisher: NA: Kodansha USA
- Magazine: Bessatsu Shōnen Magazine
- Original run: September 9, 2010 – November 2011
- Volumes: 1

Negiho (ネギほ), also known as Mahora Little Girls, is a Japanese one shot manga written and illustrated by Yui. It is a spin-off of Negima created by Ken Akamatsu. The manga originally ran in the magazine Bessatsu Shōnen Magazine from September 2010 to November 2011. The name Negiho or "Negiho (Ito) Bun" derives its name from the word "negi" the Japanese word for spring (green) onion.

== Plot ==
Mahora Academy has just gotten a new teacher, Negi Springfield. Asuna, a preschooler at the academy, falls in love with him at first sight.

== Characters ==
- Negi Springfield is a young adult teacher at Mahora Academy preschool. He is shown to be very caring of his students, helping them and watching out for them in their time of need.
- Asuna Kagurazaka is a five-year-old preschooler who has a massive crush on her teacher Negi. She refers to him initially as Skinny onion.
- Konoka Konoe is shown to be friendly towards Asuna, giving her advice on how to manage her crush on Negi. In chapter three she was thought to have a stalker who later is shown to be Setsuna protecting her, Konoka thanks Setsuna soon afterwards.
- Ayaka Yukihiro is a blonde haired preschooler and a rival of Asuna.
- Nodoka Miyazaki is four years old and is a classmate of Asuna. She is first shown in the first chapter trying to stop her from climbing up a tree. Asuna climbed up a tree hoping Negi would notice and save her but instead both Nodoka and Asuna fell to the ground with Asuna landing on the ground while Nodoka landed in Negi's arms. Furious and jealous Asuna challenged Nodoka to a duel afterwards to see who was more "grown up". The duel later ended with Negi breaking it up out of concern for their safety.
- Setsuna Sakurazaki is a sword wielding preschooler. She is first shown in chapter three as a "stalker" who in reality was protecting Konoka from danger. She appears to have a crush on Konoka, calling her Ojosama (Respectful term for young miss).

== Publication ==
The first and only volume was released on November 17, 2011, by Kodansha. Negiho was adapted into English by Kodansha USA and was released on May 7, 2013 (ISBN 1612622658). The series takes place in an alternate world from the series Negima where the characters are pre-schoolers and Negi their teacher is a young adult.

== Reception ==
Negiho has received mixed reviews. Nick Rowe from readcomicbooks.net gave the manga a negative review calling it creepy and an average comedy read that is not kid friendly. Sean Gaffney from mangabookshelf.com said that he felt that the manga was not creepy but went on to ask "Who was this written for?", citing that, "I can’t imagine fans of the original, especially in the West, being enthralled by preschool comedy adventures".
