= Night Head Genesis =

Japanese anime television series

- Created by: George Iida
- Anime television series
- Directed by: Yoshio Takeuchi
- Written by: George Iida
- Music by: Shigeru Umebayashi
- Studio: Bee Media; Actas
- Licensed by: NA: Anime Works
- Original network: Animax, BS Japan
- English network: US: Toku
- Original run: July 27, 2006 – December 31, 2006
- Episodes: 24
- icon

Night Head Genesis is a Japanese anime television series adapted from the 1992 TV drama Night Head. It began airing on the anime television network Animax on July 27, 2006.

The series was licensed for a North American release on February 14, 2008, by Media Blasters, and premiered in January 2016 on Toku in the United States.

== Plot ==
Due to their paranormal abilities, two young brothers are cast out by their parents and given into the custody of a research center. They escape fifteen years later, and soon learn that they will play a pivotal role in the coming "Upheaval".

== Characters ==
=== Kirihara brothers ===
Naoto Kirihara (桐原直人, Kirihara Naoto)
Voiced by: Toshiyuki Morikawa, Akeno Watanabe (young)
Naoto Kirihara is a powerful psychokinetic. Naoto can exhaust himself, physically, by using his psychokinetic power beyond what he normally uses. He also possesses the ability to communicate telepathically with his younger brother, Naoya. Naoto is fiercely protective of Naoya, being the elder of the two and because of Naoya's innate power. Naoto is the more self-assured of the two and has a more fiery temper. When angered, Naoto often strikes out with his psychokinesis - most often destroying nearby objects. He often helps Naoya every time he sees a traumatic vision (like the case with the young girl who looks and acts like a doll and lives in what they called the "dollhouse"). Naoto fears the destructive potential of his abilities. Naoya did not agree to this, saying that there is a meaning in them having these powers and that he could not do anything without his brother. Still, it haunts him.
Naoya Kirihara (桐原 ナオヤ, Kirihara Naoya)
Voiced by: Akira Ishida, Yuki Masuda (young)
Naoya Kirihara is a clairvoyant, telepath, seer and also has the power to heal. Naoya's abilities are a source of great suffering to him - physical contact with people or objects can trigger traumatic visions. Naoya is sometimes left in a state of catatonia after a particularly shocking vision. The only person who does not have this effect on him is his elder brother, Naoto, who is 6 years older. He calls Naoto "Nii-san" - meaning "elder brother" when he grows older but back when he was a kid, he called him "Nii-chan". Naoya relies on Naoto in many ways. Naoya often stands behind Naoto, using him as a shield to discourage physical contact with others. When their powers were fully awake, he experienced what Shouko had gone through - overcoming the physical self and become a spirit-like being (it is shown like he was standing outside of Earth, watching over it) which causes him to disappear from time to time. Naoya tells this to Naoto, that he experiences everything and seen everything when he was there, he also discovers where their estranged parents are. This made Naoto very worried and thought that Naoya will leave him too, just like what their parents did to them when they were young. Naoya assured him that he will stay with his brother in this side of the world. As a child, Naoya would go so far as to follow behind Naoto - holding onto the back of his jacket.

=== Research Center staff ===
Mikuruya Kyojiro (京次郎 みくりや, Kyojiro Mikuruya)
Voiced by: Hidetoshi Nakamura
Mikuriya is the head of the research center where the Kirihara brothers were raised. Naoto holds strong resentment toward Mikuriya for taking Naoya and him from their parents and keeping them captive for years. However, the brothers maintain contact with Mikuriya following their escape, and come to his aid when the research facility was burnt to the ground and he is held captive. Mikuriya considers himself the guardian and protector of the brothers during their 15 years at the research center. He also believes that since he took care of the brothers, that they owe him, even guilting the two into saving him, which annoyed Naoto more. After their escape, he went out of the country and lived his life a scholar outside Japan and was seen again when he contacted the Kirihara brothers because of a strange girl, Naji, who shows unbelievable powers. He was last seen inside his office with Naji drawing something for the Kirihara brothers which Naoya sees through his vision and tells his brother about it.
Hikita (引田)
One of the research centers' employee. She is the first one who approached the brothers when they tried to escape the first time they were sent to the research center. She befriends Naoya but the truth is, she is really terrified of the brothers and she is doing all this just for the money. When Naoya discover this, he went into shock and Naoto tries to calm him down. Mikuriya later explains that it is only normal for a person to think of money since it is a necessity in life.
Mariko (麻理子)
One of the research centers' employee. She first appeared in Episode 6 when the Kirihara brothers escaped and went to see their house, which is no longer there. She gives Naoto an envelope full of money which was given by Mikuriya. She seem to have a thing for Naoto because she has a picture of her and Naoto and keeps on looking at it. She also asked Naoto if he even remembers her, much to Naoto's confusion.
Nishikido (錦戸)
Somehow related to the research center because he contacts Mikuriya every now and then. He seem to know Elder Misaki and said that a ceremony without cremation is illegal. He is last seen as the one who gave Mikuriya an envelope containing money when he decided to leave Japan for good. When Mikuriya left, he even salutes on his back.
Naji (なじ)
A five-year-old orphan, living in Moscow, who predicts of global destruction and that the Kirihara brothers is somehow connected to this. She did not speak but when she was handed a crayon, she starts sketching - non stop (she did not eat or sleep and neither did she starve nor faint) - the map of the world with marks all over it, which is also known as the Red Zone (areas where diseased or natural disaster threaten the population). She was last seen drawing a picture of her and the Kirihara brothers, inside Mikuriya's office.
Elder Misaki (みさき 先輩, Misaki-senpai)
A mysterious presence at the research center. He is a very powerful psychic with unspecified abilities. He erected the mystical barrier around the research center which was sensitive to individuals and kept specific people out and others inside its limits, these are the Kirihara brothers. During the early stages of their stay in the research center, Naoto always tries to escape but was always deflected by the barrier, much to his annoyance. The barrier disappeared upon his death at the beginning of the series, which allowed the Kirihara brothers to finally escape and explore the outside world. It is certain that Elder Misaki had the power of foresight and Mikuriya, the Kirihara brothers and Shouko hold him in high regard. At the beginning of the series, there's always a squirrel on his shoulder or around him, showing his gentle aura.

=== Other characters ===
Shouko Futami (翔子 二見, Futami Shouko)
Voiced by: Akeno Watanabe
Futami Shouko is a high school student that possesses such power that she transcended her physical being. She existed outside of space and time. Even before losing her physical form, Shouko was able to travel in both time and space at will, and she would tell this to her best friend. During her travels, she would go missing for days which her best friend was already used to. So when Shouko went missing again, she thought that Shouko would come back, but her friend was gone, for good. This happened after Shouko learned that Elder Misaki had died. Shouko had foreseen the upcoming "Upheaval" and that the Kirihara brothers would play a pivotal role. It was like she took the place of Elder Misaki and watched over and guided them. She always appears in her school uniform. Her last transformation was that akin to a butterfly when she could no longer hold her physical body. This greatly saddened Naoya but Shouko promised him that she will continue to watch over them.

Yumiko Futami (翔子 ゆみこ, Futami Yumiko)
Shouko's mother.
Miki Tachibana (橘 みき, Tachibana Miki)
Voiced by: Madoka Kimura
The only known friend of Shouko. Before she disappeared, Shouko gives her the notebook that is full of hieroglyphics called Rongo Rongo found on Easter Island. She and the brothers met where Miki waits for the Kirihara brothers pass at her house just as Shouko said. She is later attacked by a man that is decorated by a blue tattoo all over his body but the brothers saves her in time. The man explains that he is actually the physical manifestation of Shouko and the brothers negative consciousness. It was unknown what happen to her after that.
Natsuko (夏子)
Yoshiki Futami's girlfriend. Yoshiki tells him to bring the Kirihara brothers to an abandoned building where he made a record of his compiled knowledge about Ark.
Sakie (咲江)
A high school student whose power is to transmit her feelings to others. She realized this when she was just a child. And when she entered high school, she decided that she must bottle up her feelings in order to prevent it from being transmitted to others, that she has to become a rock - still and emotionless. She is Tsuzuki's student whom she had a sexual relationship with. Later, she moves to Ark Corporation to play her role, unbeknownst to her, orchestrated by Okuhara Akiko. When she discovers Tomomi dead, she unleashes her full power which caused great destruction on anything that is within 25km radius. After Naoya heals Tomomi, the sisters were finally reunited.
Tomomi (ともみ)
Sakie's little sister. She loves her big sister so much that even though her parents' agreed to send Sakie to Ark, she vehemently refuses to part with her. She's later killed by Mikumo to unleash Sakie's true power because of the extreme sadness but was revived by Naoya through his power of healing and his strong will to save Tomomi.
Miyoko Fujisaki (藤崎 みよこ, Fujisaki Miyoko)
Sakie's classmate and a bully. Along with her friends namely Tsutsui Miwa, Takashima Kazumi, Inakami Rei and Minami Noriko, humiliates her and tells everyone about Sakie and Tsuzuki-sensei (means teacher) relationship. After that, they were found dead and looks like they have committed suicide by drowning themselves in the pool with Sakie however Sakie survived, with the timely arrival of the Kirihara brothers. Naoya discovers after that it was actually Mikumo who made them commit suicide, not Sakie.
Reiko Hirose (ヒロセ レイコ, Hirose Reiko)
The Kirihara brothers met her in the bar called "Stinger". It is also here that Naoya discovers Reiko's doing - killing young women who, oddly enough, all wear purple. Before she even came to the bar Stinger, she already killed 4 woman all wearing purple. Unknown to her, Naoya, through his vision and with the help of Shouko, sees what will happen and thus they went to save the woman. Realizing that the brothers were not part of Ark, she killed herself by falling off of the hotel where she is supposed to kill the 5th woman.
Jiro (二郎)
Reiko's accomplice on her mission to kill young women who wear purple. He is the type that likes to be dominated and even bullied in which, Reiko has no problem on doing it. When Reiko dies, he explains that Ark is after Reiko and that they sent out their people who will kill Reiko in purple.
Jin (ジン)
One of the customers inside the bar Stinger where the owner is called "Master". The other patrons are Hiroko (his girlfriend), Tagawa (one with the gray coat and consulted a fortune teller about his daughters' incoming engagement), a girl in pigtails with her boyfriendYoko, a man in a blue coat who is actually a photo journalist, and the man with a blue hat (who offers to replace the tire of the brothers' getaway car for 30,000 yen). He is a known bully and very much hates people who talk about other people having supernatural powers. And with this, he comes in conflict with Naoto. The aftermath of the encounter is that he is admitted to a hospital with broken bones and a cerebral concussion. 4 other patrons of the bar were also confined.
Masayuki Yujima (ゆうじま まさゆき, Yujima Masayuki)
Masayuki was a lonely boy who had no friends except his beloved dog. When the dog was run over by a bunch of teenage bikers he was devastated and took revenge on the teenagers by making them commit suicide via mind control. The students who died were Taguchi, Masaki, Megumi and Takao. Yoshimi (best friend of Megumi and has the same crystal necklace as the latter has; she is also supposed to be the 4th victim but is saved by the Kirihara brothers but Takao died in her stead), Yukio and Youji survived. The Kirihara brothers eventually track him down and stop his rampage. They sent him to the research center, where they themselves were sent once, to help him learn control his powers. He reappears in Episode 12 where he apparently makes a middle-aged woman commit suicide by jumping off a building. The middle age woman was actually met the brothers minutes before her demise and she introduce herself an employee of Purple Chain (owns night clubs, restaurants and a talent scout agency) and is in search of models. She finds the Kirihara brothers appropriate for the job and tries to hire them but they refuse. When they tried to leave, she took Naoya's arm which surprised Naoto. Surprisingly, Naoya was not affected, saying he knew that it will happen and so he mentally prepared himself to avoid getting shock. Minutes later, she died. It is later revealed that he was actually being controlled by Sonezaki Michio.
Tsukasa Kamiya (神谷 つかさ, Kamiya Tsukasa)
Dubbed as the 'Modern Nostradamus', he sees the brothers in one of his vision and that they are somehow related to man's destruction. Working as a regular employee in Taito Enterprises, he meets the Kirihara brothers and both he and Naoya saw what exactly will lead to man's demise - Dr Kanako. His boss, Chief Kurokawa, is one of those who did not believe him, especially when Kamiya said that he will die of a heart attack in a park alone. He also seem to have awaken Naoya's power as a foreseer although he says the younger Kirihara is not suitable for such since he empathize too much. Before they part ways, he predicts that the brothers will be reunited with their parents and that there is a girl (Shouko) in a desert. He died when Sonezaki, using his mind control, made him see a dream wherein there is a flying golden elephant on top of his head and put a white powdered poison in his mouth. Police says it is suicide, Naoto knows otherwise.
Kanako Kurahashi (倉橋 かなこ, Kurahashi Kanako)
The scientist who will cause the destruction of mankind with her experiment of a drug that suppresses viral activity. It is supposed to stop HIV. Together with her assistant, Tadano, she works on this until the Kirihara brothers go to her laboratory and warns her of the danger if she completes her work. At first, she does not believe them until one of Kamiya's fanatics, a woman, attacks her. She refuses to stop her work since it is like killing her, whereas Naoto says that if she continues, she will kill everyone on Earth. She and Naoto have the same dream of being together as a married couple but Naoya is nowhere in sight. Because of this, Naoto refuses to be with her since he cannot leave his little brother alone. Finally, She decides to delete all her work and makes no copies in which Tadano refuses to do so. He is killed by one of Kamiya's fanatics, this time, a man and nearly kills her if not for Naoto's timely arrival. It is unknown what happens to her after that.
Naomi Kirihara (倉橋 ナオミ, Kirihara Naomi)
Voiced by: Yuuko Nitou
She is the mother of the Kirihara brothers. She, along with her husband, gave their sons to Mikuriya to watch over them. She is afraid of her own sons powers. When they were reunited, they have a different memory of their sons. In their memory, their sons died at a very young age due to drowning. They tried to save a girl who was drowning in a lake. They saved the girl but they were drowned instead. She is a lot older than she should be. She and her husband were now working on a watch repair shop. Sonezaki visited them to get his watch that was under repair, however the brothers were there also and so a fight begun. After the small fight, she and her husband grew fearful of the Kirihara brothers and asked them to leave.
Yukihiko Kirihara (倉橋 ゆきひこ, Kirihara Yukihiko)
Voiced by: Yasunori Masutani
Father of the Kirihara brothers who gave their sons to Mikuriya to watch over them. Like his wife, he is also afraid of his own sons power, especially Naoto because he was attacked twice before by him, although it was unintended and sudden. When they were reunited, they have a different memory of their sons. In their memory, their sons died at a very young age due to drowning. They try to save a girl whose boat capsized in a lake near their house. They saved the girl but they were not able to make it. Like his wife also, he is a lot older than he should be. He owns a watch repair shop called "Kirihara Clocks" where he and his wife works.
Hanaoka (花岡)
One of Kirihara Yukihiko's employee in the toy factory. They, his wife and high school daughter Sanae, tried to swindle Yukihiko by selling him a dope land but was discovered by Naoya when, even when he is terrified, touches him before he leaves their house, with the signed contract in hand.
Hitomi Namikawa (浪川 ひとみ, Namikawa Hitomi)
She is a government employee who works for Councilman Ikutaka. Her father is known to have predicted, using a seismic vibration machine and the vegetation, the coming of a huge earthquake in their town and cause chaos but it did not happen. This event resulted to losing the credibility of her father and she and her little sister Rena had a hard time, dealing with the townspeople and at school. 3 years after, her father again sees an incoming earthquake and tries to warn everyone, by hook or by crook. The Kirihara brothers, after a year and a half, tries to help prevent this huge earthquake which is, according to Naji, will be the cause of global destruction. They somehow able to lessen the impact of the earthquake but Hitomi's father died when he tried to save Hitomi from a falling debris. Rena seem to like Naoya and said that she will continue her father's legacy.

=== Ark Corporation ===
Viewed from the outside, they are a network of IT Firm and in conjunction to this, they have many connections with politicians. But in the show's canon, they are a group of people who are on a mission to stop the destruction of mankind, in this case, the destruction of the material world and its transition to spiritual world (Upheaval). And the people who have supernatural powers that they found were under Project Night Head.

Akiko Okuhara
CEO of Ark Corporation. She appears sitting on a wheelchair that has a joystick-like control which she uses for steering. Her power is precognitive and its quite powerful. She used it to observe the brothers and also her own employees. It's because she believes that the Kirihara brothers will hinder them on their mission. Unfortunately for her, she could not see clearly the fate of the brothers because they were protected by Shouko. She already predicted that Tsuzuki will betray her and will try to save Sakie from Ark. She let it happen because Sakie's power is amplified by sadness. If something happens to Tsuzuki, who is important to Sakie, it will have quite an impact on her. Even so, it was not enough to fully awaken her power. In the end, she accepted the fact that the Kirihara brothers, even in her controlled world, changed the course of fate through their free will and that they truly are the X-factor. Before she died, she took Sakie's power so that she can live a normal life for once.
Sakaguchi
Assistant of Okuhara Akiko. His power can be classified as a Suppressive power—power to neutralize another's power. Meaning, he is not affected by any kind of supernatural power. He also took Sakie away from her family (with consent from the parents) and brought her to Ark. He is very mysterious and Akiko finds him amusing since she cannot use her own power on him. When Akiko died, he was right beside her and it was unknown what happened to him after that.
Mikumo
One of the employees' of Ark Corporation. A silver haired man who wears a pink long coat with a yellow necktie and has the ability to use mind control. He used this on Tsuzuki when he tried to escape Ark and save Sakie. He also uses this to Naoto and discovers his weakness - that Naoto might enjoy killing people. He and Naoto had a confrontation in a form of a battle inside Naoto's mind. Naoto, after fighting Mikumo, thinks he killed him just to find out that he actually kills Naoya and this greatly sadden Naoto. He released a powerful energy and after that, he simply disappeared. But when Naoto is revived, they finish their battle with Mikumo defeated. Before the final act though, he stated he hates Naoya because, after what he had done (to his brother and to Tomomi), Naoya could not bring himself to hate him, which made him more furious. Before he dies, he reveals that when he was 17 years old, he unintentionally entered his parents' mind and made them commit suicide. He also said that the Kirihara brothers were on an oasis called "research center" because if they were not there, Naoto may end up like him. Lastly, he wished that he could have met Naoto much earlier.
Yousuke Tsuzuki
Voiced by: Tetsuharu Ōta
One of the employees' of Ark Corporation. He works as a professor in Sakie's school to observe her, later got in a sexual relationship with her. However, he changes his mind and abandons the plan and tries to save Sakie from Ark. However, Mikumo got to him before he leaves the country and, using mind control, he drives Tsuzuki to a state of frenzy and craziness, to the point that he needs to be admitted on a mental hospital.
Yoshiki Futami
One of the employees' of Ark Corporation. Age 33 years old, born on June 13, 1973. Even though he has the same last name as Shouko, he does not seem to be in any relation to her. He works for Ark Corporation for 3 years using his power to see things through a medium - Internet - but when he sees Shouko during his work, he is forbidden to see her again. This rouses suspicion on him and investigated Ark Corporation in depth but he was caught. Before any harm is done to him, he transfers his physical and mental being through the web and warns the Kirihara brothers about Ark's plan.
Sonezaki Michio
One of the employees' of Ark Corporation, Sonezaki, an evil madman who can control people and make them do his bidding. He discovered he can use mind control when one night, when his parents were fighting and he was a high school student then, he thought that his father should just kill her mother. And he did. Then he spent his life miserable and in this state, Mikuriya found him and declares he will save him. He is in the research center for 3 years when he decides to escape, much to Mikuriya's disappointment. Elder Misaki allows this to happen and did not try to stop him. The Kirihara brothers meets him. He acts cool and confident when it turns out that he's merely taking out the short-comings and failures of his own horrible life on others. As such, he's confronted by those he killed previously (his mother and Kamiya) and has a mental breakdown to the point of running down the street screaming in fear. He is last seen as hugging his knees, with a glazed expression and drool on his lips.
Asano
He is introduced by Sonezaki as the one in charge of the records.

== Anime ==
From episodes 1 to 13, the first ending theme is Kotoba (言葉, lit. Words) by Under Graph. From Episodes 14 to 24, the second ending theme is Nemutte Ita Kimochi, Nemutte Ita Kokoro (眠っていた気持ち 眠っていたココロ) by Aya Kamiki.

=== Episode list ===
No.	Title	Original release date
1	"Memories" "Kioku" (記憶)	July 29, 2006 (Note: Episodes 1 and 2 aired together as a one-hour television special.)
2	"Touch" "Sesshoku" (接触)	July 29, 2006
3	"Impatience" "Shōsō" (焦燥)	August 5, 2006
4	"Trace" "Konseki" (痕跡)	August 12, 2006
5	"Reminiscence" "Kaisō" (回想)	August 19, 2006
6	"Connection" "Rensa" (連鎖)	August 26, 2006
7	"Remorse" "Kaikon" (悔恨)	September 2, 2006
8	"Recollection" "Tsuioku" (追憶)	September 9, 2006
9	"Annihilation" "Senmetsu" (殲滅)	September 16, 2006
10	"Providence" "Shin'i" (神意)	September 23, 2006
11	"Nightmare" "Akumu" (悪夢)	September 30, 2006
12	"Bewilderment" "Konwaku" (困惑)	October 7, 2006
13	"Game" "Yūgi" (遊戯)	October 14, 2006
14	"Incarceration" "Yūhei" (幽閉)	October 21, 2006
15	"Surge" "Hadō" (波動)	October 28, 2006
16	"Reunion" "Saikai" (再会)	November 4, 2006
17	"Haze of Dust" "Sajin" (砂塵)	November 11, 2006
18	"Ark" "Hakobune" (方舟)	November 19, 2006
19	"Visions" "Mugen" (夢幻)	November 26, 2006
20	"Conciliation" "Kaijū" (懐柔)	December 3, 2006
21	"Funeral Attendance" "Sōsō" (葬送)	December 10, 2006
22	"Judgement of God" "Shinpan" (神判)	December 17, 2006
23	"Wandering" "Hōkō" (彷徨)	December 24, 2006
24	"Hope" "Kibō" (希望)	December 31, 2006
