= Kensuke Hijikata =

Japanese photographer (born 1922)

Kensuke Hijikata (土方 健介, Hijikata Kensuke; born 1922) is a Japanese photographer. He covered his camera in sealskin to photograph in cold environments.
