= Kensuke Shiina =

Kensuke Shiina 椎名謙介
- Born: 4 June 1969 (age 57)
- Origin: Japan
- Genre: Trip hop
- Occupations: DJ, musician, electronic technician
- Labels: Pussyfoot, Consipio

Kensuke Shiina (椎名 謙介, Shiina Kensuke; born 4 June 1969) is a Japanese DJ and musician, electronic technician, an exponent of trip hop and lounge music. His notable recordings date from the late 1990s. He was an original member of Yann Tomita's group Audio Science Laboratorie. He makes unique electronic musical instruments.

== Life and Career ==
Kensuke was born and raised in Yokohama, Japan. He grew up in a family where "you worked to earn what you wanted," which inspired a knack of his to cobble together makeshift radios, sound machines, and gadgets that he couldn't afford to buy. This would influence his later musical style, sampling together different pieces of music to create something new.

In the early 1980s, he started in music production, and worked on radio stations. In the mid '80s, his wide musical knowledge led him to be hired as a freelance music selector and writer for mainstream radio shows, dramas, and fashion runways.

In the early 1990s, he produced for Colin Bass, and the Japanese hip-hop group Gas Boys[jp], before being taken in by the English record company Pussyfoot Records. He released his debut single, “Insomniac,” in 1995, followed by the song “Ring Of Fire” in 1997, along with the remix album "Have Some More Java? (Ring of Fire Remixes)".

== Style ==
In his youth, Kensuke Shiina had a love for prog rock, which turned into a love for punk. Upon discovering genres like funk and soul, he became an early adopter of "rare grooves," which he found through Japanese record stores. In the early '80s, however, inspired by his work at local radio stations and the group Snakeman Show[jp], he focused less on adhering to a specific genre, and instead creating music with no set boundaries. His music has been described variously as downtempo, trip hop, Shibuya-kei, ambient, and electronic. He is known for his Ring of Fire remixes and Insomniac track.

== Discography ==
Compilations

- A Journey into Ambient Groove Vol.2 (1995)
- Fish Smell Like Cat (1997) UK cd: Pussyfoot CDLP005
- Suck it and See (1998) UK 2 cd: Pussyfoot CDLP069
- Pussy Galore (1997) UK cd: Pussyfoot CDLP007
