= Negima!? =

2006 Japanese manga and anime series

- Promotional advertisement

ネギま!?
- Genre: Adventure, fantasy, romantic comedy
- Created by: Ken Akamatsu
- Anime television series
- Directed by: Shin Oonuma (Note: Credited as Chief Director (チーフディレクター, Chīfu Direkutā).); Akiyuki Shinbo
- Produced by: Fukashi Azuma (TV Tokyo); Shinichi Ikeda (Yomiko Advertising); Gō Nakanishi (King Records)
- Written by: Kenichi Kanemaki
- Music by: Kei Haneoka
- Studio: Shaft
- Licensed by: AUS: Madman Entertainment; NA: Sentai Filmworks (expired); UK: Manga Entertainment
- Original network: TXN (TV Tokyo)
- Original run: October 4, 2006 – March 28, 2007
- Episodes: 26
- Manga

Negima!? neo
- Written by: Takuya Fujima
- Published by: Kodansha
- English publisher: NA: Del Rey (#1-6) Kodansha USA (#7)
- Magazine: Magazine Special
- Original run: November 2006 – August 2009
- Volumes: 7

Negima!? (Japanese: ネギま!?) is an anime television series created by Shaft. It is an alternate retelling of the Negima! Magister Negi Magi series. Directed by Akiyuki Shinbo, it aired from October 4, 2006, to March 28, 2007, in Japan. The anime was accompanied by a monthly manga series by Takuya Fujima called Negima!? neo. Both series feature the same characters and locations. This new season aired on TV Tokyo's late afternoon time slot rather than on late nights, like the original anime series did.

== Plot ==
A dark sinister tale befalls ten-year-old Negi Springfield and class 2-A. One year after Negi's arrival at Mahora, two representatives from the Magic Academy arrive at Mahora with the news of the disappearance of a mysterious artifact known as the Star Crystal. The Star Crystal holds a power that not even the Thousand Master could control. Even though the reason or the cause behind the Star Crystal's disappearance is a mystery, the effects of the artifact begin to envelop Negi and his students. Surrounded by a menacing power, Negi and the class must cope as the dark power harasses and attack the class at a moment's whim. Simultaneously, Negi places his thoughts towards his missing father, while the supporting cast do all they can to provide assistance.

== Production ==
Under the direction of Akiyuki Shinbo, animation studio Shaft took the production of this Negima series in a direction different from Ken Akamatsu's manga or the anime production from XEBEC. However, the first three episodes do cover a modified version of Evangeline's story arc in volume 3 of the manga and on episodes VI to VIII of the first anime.

In the same vein as Shinbo's previous series, Pani Poni Dash!, the anime features a plethora of parodies and references to popular culture, many of which appear seemingly randomly on the chalkboards in classroom scenes. Abundant eyecatches and light-hearted omake shorts at the end of each episode are also of a generally parodic nature. The use of parodies adds to an already plentiful use of humor into the series.

As an alternate series, the show makes references to the previous one. References range from the subtle, like some of Chiu's costumes, to the obvious, like the first series's theme song Happy Material utilized during the mass Pactio activation.

Unlike its predecessors, sexual fanservice is minimal and is often shown either unwittingly or as part of a non-sexual gag. For instance, Setsuna exposes her black tight-fitting shorts worn under her skirt after she crashes into a dinnerware cabinet. In another case, a potential bath scene among the characters (Mana, Zazie, Sayo, and Kazumi) turns out to be exploration of the bathroom. Their civilian clothes simply expose Kazumi and Zazie's bare shoulders, and Mana's midriff.

With the wide array of characters, sometimes short scenes are used to allow air time for various characters. Often, they are sub-grouped and rarely seen alone. Also included are short side story plots, usually non-relevant to the main story. Some themes, gags, and motifs have been recurring throughout the series. Many of these have been cut scenes. Usually, these have little or no relevance to the main storyline.

Also, artwork by the voice actors is shown. Usually they appear when the sponsor acknowledgements appear, although some of them appear also as eyecatches and transition markers. Each artwork depicts at least that VA's character and it appears on the episode where that particular character says the episode title. Art styles of each artwork vary, ranging from artistic to mediocre to crude. In fact, Yu Kobayashi's artwork of Setsuna as shown in the sixth episode is so crude that in the following episode, a badly-drawn Setsuna (done by Kobayashi) is seen talking to Konoka probably as a depiction of shame after Setsuna vows to Asuna to not wear a Chupacabra T-shirt and not let Konoka don one, which Konoka did.

There are also two broadcast versions of the show: a pan and scan, 4:3 standard-definition version shown on TV Tokyo and a widescreen high-definition one shown on sister channel BS Japan. Even in the 4:3 version however, there are scenes meant to be shown in 16:9. This is addressed by having the scenes letterboxed, surrounded by gold decorated mattes at the top and bottom of the screen rather than the usual plain black ones. Of course, these "gold bars" do not appear in the widescreen version, which is used in the DVD releases of the episodes (with some minor modifications).

== Characters ==
As a remake, characters appearing from the original Mahou Sensei Negima appear in this retelling. However, under Studio Shaft, the characters have taken a redesign. The redesigns are featured in the first episode, as all girls from Negi's class are introduced. The majority of the characters are drawn with a more youthful appearance than the first series, with finer details; yet they retain their basic character designs. This also includes some of their original characteristics, behaviors, and traits.

Characters reappearing are Negi Springfield, Chamo, Takahata, Nekane Springfield, Anya, Konoka's grandfather, and the class 3-A.

=== New characters ===
A narrator is used throughout the series to give light commentary, explain events, review and preview episodes, and occasionally interact or react to character involvement. Sometimes, his direct conversations cause certain characters to break the fourth wall. The narrator is voiced by Mugihito; in the English dub, he is played by Christopher Sabat.

Shichimi (シチミ) and Motsu (モツ) are two "agents" from the Magic Academy sent with a report about the Star Crystals' disappearance. Their true forms are unknown since they took the images drawn up by Haruna; Shichimi is a cat, and Motsu is a frog. They then stay at Mahora and keep a close eye on Negi to ensure his magic secrecy, but if Negi lets his secret out he will be turned into an animal. Eventually, this role changes when all of class 3-A learn about magic and became Pactio partners. Early on, a few strange cutscenes show them playing with tissue paper and Bubble Wrap, but they ultimately end up intruding on other members of the class as mere annoyances. Occasionally, they are found with the Black Rose Baron. In the end, it is revealed that they don't in fact, work for the academy. They actually work for Negi's father, and he gives them to Negi as servants.

Motsu is the comic among the two, providing some occasional comic relief by doing comedic action, making random remarks, and taking occasional disguises for hilarity. Whenever he is not in disguise, he is typically seen wearing either a necktie, a mustache, or a tuft of hair. In the later episodes, a bizarre sub-plot involves him and Makie, where Makie refers to him as "Daddy". Makie eventually explained that she never actually thought Motsu was her father; rather, she was simply comparing him to a pet dog her family used to own, who was named "Daddy" and who resembled Motsu. Motsu's favorite line is "...in a good way" (いい意味で, ii imide), which he often says in ironic circumstances, such as while crying on the tea he prepared for Takamichi and Evangeline after being "rejected" by Makie. Motsu appears to be based on Aboshi Frog, a character created by Mako Aboshi for the Pani Poni Dash! anime, which is also a Shaft production.

Shichimi, on the other hand, provides voices of reason. She has no visible limbs, which only appear when holding or scratching something. She is also able to elongate her entire body like a snake. Having an inherent cuteness, she later begins to hang around with Nodoka often, with some of the moments ranging from Shichimi taking a nap on Nodoka's lap to the cat sitting on Nodoka's head while Nodoka is in her Armor form. True to her mostly feline form, she ends her sentences with "mya" (ミャ), as if mimicking a cat's meow.

Motsu is voiced by Chiwa Saito, and Shichimi is voiced by Miyuki Sawashiro. In the English dub, Motsu and Shichimi are played by Trina Nishimura and Brina Palencia respectively.

The Black Rose Baron (黒薔薇男爵, kurobara danshaku) made her presence known to Negi when he and his students were looking for information about the Star Crystal. Dressed in white formal attire with a black cape, hat, and a gold mask covering the left side of her face, she confronts Negi and occasionally members of the 3-A class. Sometimes, she targets Chamo with a black rose. As she comes and goes, black rose petals fly around her. Neither a friend or foe, her true identity is kept hidden until the last few episodes; during the anime, it had been speculated the Baron was actually Negi's father, even though the viewers can easily tell that the Baron is a she.

Black Rose Baron's true identity is actually Negi's sister, Nekane. Konoka and Setsuna made observations about Nekane's movements and behavior. Then Konoka makes her deduction regarding the Black Rose and a connection to Nekane. So, for Nekane's sake, everyone decides to keep this knowledge a secret, even from Nekane herself. In episode 22, Takahata addresses the Black Rose Baron as Nekane in front of Negi.

Nekane is voiced by Miyuki Sawashiro, both in and out of the Black Rose Baron guise. In the English dub, she is voiced by Gwendolyn Lau, again in both identities.

Mr. Yamada (山田さん, yamada-san), first name never known, is an old watchman in Mahora's Library Island. He goes around the library's underground corridors with a lighted lamp on his left hand and an eyepatch on his right eye. He seems to live in Library Island's underground rooms and literally cooks at its indoor restaurant. He possesses extensive knowledge of the library's collection but ironically not the layout of the library itself. He also recognizes regulars to the place such as Nodoka. He has a habit of announcing himself by saying in a loud voice "I am Mr. Yamada!" and falling into obvious traps.

He only appears in the episode wherein Negi and his students attempt to find the book about the Star Crystal and at the same time Kaede and Narutaki twins search for a book that will make the twins grow up faster. He is not seen since then, although Nodoka mentions him in a later episode.

He is played by Yuichi Nagashima, who recently changed his stage name to Chō (チョー). In the English dub, he is played by Cole Brown.

=== Voice cast changes ===
With a few exceptions, the cast of Negima!? is the same from Negima!: Magister Negi Magi.

- Chiwa Saito replaces Ryou Hirohashi as Anya's voice actress.
- Miyuki Sawashiro replaces Masami Suzuki as Nekane Springfield's voice actor and replaces Takehito Koyasu as Nagi Springfield's voice actor.
- Megumi Takamoto replaces Chiaki Osawa as Chao Lingshen's voice actress.

For the English version:

- Brittney Karbowski replaces Kate Bristol as Anya's voice actress, Bristol reprises her role as Sayo Aisaka.
- Carrie Savage replaces Jayme Westman as Satomi Hakase's voice actress.
- Cherami Leigh replaces Dana Schultes as Setsuna Sakurazaki's voice actress, and Jenny Phagan as Akira Okuchi's voice actress. She also replaces Alison Viktorin as Fuka and Fumika Narutaki's voices in the last three episodes of the series.
- J. Michael Tatum replaces Troy Baker as Nagi Springfield's voice actor.
- Mary Morgan replaces Lucy Small as Madoka Kugimiya's voice actress.
- R Bruce Elliott replaces the late Randy Tallman as Konoemon "Dean" Konoe's voice actor.

=== Pactio cards ===
In this new Negima!? series, the "Pactio" system that allows Negi to perform provisional contracts is revised. The Pactio system gives the new Negima!? series a more magical girl-like kind of style to the original one. Pactio Cards are now split into three types: Armor (Rare), Cosplay, and Dud (Suka). Typically, the Armor/Rare card is the strongest, bringing forth the true powers of the partner. The Cosplay card gives powers to the partner too, despite being weaker than the Armor ones. The strength comparison is clearly displayed with Nodoka's power. Her Cosplay card gives her one book that reads thoughts, while her Rare card gives her multiple books that can gather information. The Dud card transforms the partner into a super deformed, defenseless version of his/herself, wearing an animal costume (in Nodoka's case, she becomes a seal). Transformation can only be performed through Negi's activation spell; and a card is chosen at random. Duration of Pactio Power is dependent on satiation (the contract ends when the partner becomes hungry). The powers for each provisional contract differ from person to person.

== Media ==
=== Manga ===
Negima!? neo is a manga retelling of the series made by Takuya Fujima under the guidance of original creator Ken Akamatsu and the supervision of Studio SHAFT. This is Fujima's first mainstream Negima work as he had previously worked on several Negima dōjin. The series started running in November 2006 in the monthly boys' manga magazine Comic BomBom. It had a brief hiatus a year later with the impending closure of Comic BomBom's publication, only to return in January 2008 in sister publication Magazine Special, this time with slightly more fanservice than it had during its run in Comic BonBon.

This series rewrites the events of the anime, following a completely different route through the Star Crystal storyline, including reordering of events and changes in when and how Pactio are formed. It borrows certain elements and character designs from the original manga as well as both anime series.

Much like the original manga, Del Rey Manga has licensed Negima!? neo for its English-language publication and they published the first six volumes. Tong Li Publishing has licensed Negima!? neo for its Chinese-language publication.

In 2010 Kodansha pulled all of their licenses from Del Rey manga and, under Random House publishing, created Kodansha Comics to continue licenses. They have stated that they will resume releases on a title-by-title basis. Along with the original Negima! Magister Negi Magi, Negima!? neo was selected for continuation. Kodansha publicshed the seventh and last volume in June 2011.

=== Anime ===
Negima!? is featured in 26 anime episodes. The season was originally licensed by Funimation, and was released under the name Negima! Season Two despite its semi-parallel relationship to Negima!. The series was released on DVD in two halves, with the second half published on March 31, 2009. Sentai Filmworks later relicensed the series in early 2018, before they lost the license to the series in 2023.

=== Video game ===
Mahō Sensei Negima!? Neo-Pactio Fight!! is a game for the Wii based upon the popular Japanese manga, Mahou Sensei Negima. It was released in Japan only on June 14, 2007. It's the third Negima game to be released on a Nintendo game console (After Mahou Sensei Negima! and its sequel on the GBA), and the first console Negima game not published by Konami.

The arenas in the game are in full-time 3D, and the characters can move in any direction, as well as jump. Up to four players can play in Battle Mode. Controls are operated by using both the Wii Remote and Nunchuk (the Classic Controller and Wii Remote (used sideways) are also supported as control methods). Certain attacks and moves involving quickly moving the Wii Remote left and right or up and down. By getting a Pactio Card, one can activate a Pactio transformation like in Negima!?, randomly (though possible to control) becoming one of the three different forms: Armor (powerful version of your character, using a very powerful attack), Cosplay (character dresses up in costumes, and boosts the characters abilities), and Suka (or "Miss", in which your character is transformed into a weak super-deformed animal, such as a Kappa in Kaede's case). The art style of the game (as well as many of its characters' moves) is based not on the original manga by Ken Akamatsu or the first anime. In between fights during the Story Mode, cut-scenes done in the style of Negima!? are shown, featuring voice acting from the voice actors of both anime adaptations. Ten characters from the Negima universe are playable as main characters. In addition, the other girls from the Negima series can be set as support (effectively a permanent power-up), similar to Marvel vs. Capcom, The King of Fighters '99, and The King of Fighters 2000. Up to two support characters can be equipped to each fighter.

== Ending shorts ==
After the credits of every episode, short character skits are included. Each skit is irrelevant to the story or episode.

=== Mahora Sentai Baka Rangers ===
This series of shorts is seen on episodes 1 to 3, 7, 10, 14, 23 and 24.

One of the most prominent set of shorts has to do with the Mahora Sentai Baka Rangers (Mahora Squadron Bakaranger), a parody of the Super Sentai series. The parody reimagines the study group as a super sentai. The five Baka Rangers are:

- Asuna as Baka Red
- Yue as Baka Black
- Kaede as Baka Blue
- Kū Fei as Baka Yellow
- Makie as Baka Pink.

They have their own title card, which parodies the sentai series Taiyo Sentai Sun Vulcan, and have their own theme song. They follow their own color coordination with the letter of their first name across the top half. They also have scarves like the original Super Sentai groups. Their roll call parodies Sun Vulcan as well, having some of the same gestures (Asuna, Kaede, and Kū Fei copy their same-color counterparts; Yue's and Makie's gestures are from the series Denshi Sentai Denjiman and a flash on each of their foreheads.

In these shorts, the Baka Rangers fight in a battle against evil, particularly against the dreaded menace of their enemy Dr. Pooh. However, most of the humor revolves around the mishaps and mistreatment of Baka Pink (Makie), who always ends up being the butt of the jokes in this metaseries. This includes having her introduction cut off, the camera never focusing on her properly, her getting squashed by their mecha, and her accidentally blowing up the team with their enemy's bomb. One of the few moments where Baka Pink gets a moment to shine is in the creation of a special movie by the Yukihiro Group, "Yuke Yuke Baka Pink", the preview of which is shown as part of a later omake (yet ultimately is found not suitable for any audience as well as emphasizes the comedic rivalry between Makie and Ayaka in this rendition of the story).

=== Jump Out, Chupa-ken! ===
This series of shorts is seen on Episodes 4 to 6 and 25.

Episode 4 through 6 had to do with the Chupacabra that Asuna believes roams the Mahora Campus. The first two involve Asuna trying to write a song about the chupacabra, leading to Haruna being surprised in regards to what she's doing. In the first one, both Asuna and Haruna are dressed as oni, while in the second, Asuna is composing while sucking on Chupa Chups lollipops. In the third short, the Chupacabra club ends up meeting about the possible existence of a chupacabra while all dressed in costumes, this time with Asuna (dressed as a robot) and Haruna (a grandfather clock) joined by Yuna (a bee) and Yue (a fairy). When Kū Fei shows up with a new costume Zazie made, Asuna takes matters into her own hands...

By episode 25, Asuna finally gets a chupacabra as a present from Anya and promptly tries to make it autograph all of the T-shirts she had made throughout the series. Unfortunately, the little creature has ideas of its own.

- Although Asuna is the primary actor of the chupacabra gags in this series from the beginning, the creature was originally brought up under different circumstances in the manga. When Evangeline attacked Makie, it was at first unknown what was the culprit. Misa suggested that it was a vampire, but Sakurako changes it around believing it was a "vampiric creature" that attacked her, leading Konoka to first imagine and draw the attacker...as a chupacabra. Upon seeing Konoka's drawing, Asuna dismisses it on the basis that a chupacabra has no reason to be in Japan. However, in this series it is Asuna who is the source of all the chupacabra comments from the get-go, with Haruna as her only main supporter.

=== Chao's Ambition ===
This series of shorts is seen on Episodes 8 and 9.

Satomi creates a special arm for Chao called the Super Power Hand. When she tries it on, Kū Fei comes out (as Kū-Rōshi, or Old Master Ku) and a timer, health bar, and a power bar appear like in fighting games just like Street Fighter. Chao 'charges up' like when a fighter charges their special attack and punches Kū Fei with the metal arm, and a meat bun comes out. When Kū Fei catches it, the meat bun absorbs all her energy causing her to faint instantly. A K.O. sign appears on the screen. In the second short, Satomi creates a second version of the Super Power Hand. This time it can make two meat buns.

=== Ah, I am the Young Yamamoto ===
This series of shorts is seen on Episodes 11 to 13

The focus is on the sports girls, particularly Akira as she watches over a pet arowana in the aquarium in her room and listening in on roommates Yuna, Ako and Misora. But while she seems strange, the outfits of her roommates are even more questionable. In the second episode, the sports girls are still swimming (like they were earlier in the episode), where they discover each other's weird taste in swimsuits. In the last one, one of the girls asks if Yamamoto can do tricks, but Akira nearly defies common sense of what a fish can do. Misora is the straight man of these bits with Yuna and Ako as her foils...and Akira in her own world.

=== Please Tea Room ===
This series of shorts is seen on Episodes 15 to 17.

Using a small Shinto shrine, three members of the Baka Rangers make offerings to the gods. In the first short, done in a stylized black and white animation, Asuna gives an offering of ramen asking the gods to buy a Chupacabra T-shirt. In the second one, Kū Fei makes a wish with her own cup of noodles (with "Chile source"), but it turns out she doesn't have a problem. In the third, Makie offers a plate of spaghetti but not even the gods acknowledge her.

=== One-shot shorts ===
The following shorts are each shown in the end of just one episode and are therefore stand-alone ones.

- Haruna's Art Song (Episode 18): In rap verse, Haruna showcases her artistic skills in calligraphy. Chisame criticizes her, Zazie makes a pun off the criticism and Chachamaru scores the pun. Haruna ignores them and keeps rapping.
- Tea Ceremony Suka (Episodes 19): The recurring tea ceremony scene of Evangeline and Chachamaru is shown with the pair in Suka form alongside Negi, Nekane, Shichimi and Motsu (who is forced to be inflated once again similar to an experiment with Akira in the same episode). Unlike the rest of class 3-A, Eva and Chachamaru are not transformed during the events of the episode as they have no Pactio with Negi yet.
- Sayoth Park (Episode 20): This short is done in an animation style similar to that used in the American series South Park. Kazumi and Nekane encounter a ghost (Sayo). When Nekane asks whether it can cause a large explosion, one goes off that knocks both to the ground.
- Ramen Takamichi Ad (Episode 21): Concluding the episode's gag, Chachamaru returns a bowl of ramen to a stranded and hungry Evangeline after being unable to find help to let them off their hut.
- The Interviews' (sic) Room (Episode 22): Kazumi attempts to interview with Chamo and Motsu.
- Epilogue (Episode 26): Negi departs with Anya and Nekane to search for his father once again. But a little bit of Mahora comes with him.

== Opening and ending themes ==
The opening and ending songs and animations vary throughout the episodes. For the most part, the songs are the same ("1000% SPARKING!" for the opening, "A-LY-YA!" for the ending) - but the characters doing the singing frequently change. A full listing can be found here.

Unlike previous episodes, the opening footage for episodes 17 onward has been given more color and different animations were used. In addition, the first part of the song is used instead of the "speaking characters" used in the original version. The DVD version slightly changed this, adding new animation and scenes to the opening, including a moving card with the Narutaki twins, as well as using certain song variations never used in the broadcast version.

However, there are two major variations. During the period where Negi has been transformed, in Episode 14, a different theme song is used, with an animation of Negi running amongst the Suka forms for some of the girls, in his transformed state. Also, In episode 19, a nearly-full version of the opening song was used. In doing so, the animation opening was done twice. The first half was complete with all Suka versions of the thirty-one girls prior to the original version in the second half, in complete color with the quotes stanza for Evangeline, Chachamaru and Satomi. Of special note is that two special shots of Akira and Ayaka, both only used in the Suka version of the opening with those two never appearing in solo shot in the regular version of the opening.

From episode 4 onward, "A-LY-YA!" was accompanied by a parade of twenty-seven of the girls scrolling left-to-right super deformed. When they reached a circle, they were highlighted and changed their super deformed form. At the bottom of that circle, the sequence begins with just super deformed Asuna dancing with a pair of maracas. As the series continues, super deformed forms of Konoka (tambourine), Setsuna (triangle), and finally Nodoka (snare drum) join Asuna to form a complete four-super-deformed-character band. All four change their manner of playing their instruments as the song progresses. Setsuna also falls asleep when the song reaches the chorus and wakes up at the end stunned and embarrassed.

In episode 25, "Love Sensation" (the opening song from the Summer OVA) sees all 31 girls in their Suka forms. Many of these girls, though, does have one small element that ties back to either their Armor or Cosplay Neo-Pactio form. (including boar Asuna with a harisen, seal Nodoka with glasses and a book, koala Konoka with her armor whip, etc.)

FUNimation created English dub versions for most of the title songs. 1000% Sparking featured the voice talent of Brina Palencia (Yue Ayase, No. 4), Luci Christian (Asuna Kagarazaka, No. 8), Jamie Marchi (Haruna Saotome, No. 14), and Leah Clark, (Nodoka Miyazaki, No. 27). Only one version of the songs were produced, instead of various versions as was the case for the original Japanese production. Brina Palencia is also the music director as well as the lyricist for the English dub versions of the songs, except for the English version of Hoshizora Letter (Starry Sky Letter), which was adapted by Mike MacFarland.

== Reception ==
In the beginning episodes, the ratings for the show were relatively good. As the series progressed the show's ratings declined. By the time the last episode aired on March 28, 2007, the show placed a lower-than-expected 34th out of the 40 anime shown for the fall 2006 season. Despite that being the case, the series was still loved by fans of the Negima franchise. The series was also stated to have better animation than the first anime series that was done by Xebec.
