= Negima! Magister Negi Magi =

Japanese manga series and its franchise

- Cover of the first tankōbon volume, featuring Negi Springfield (left) and Asuna Kagurazaka (right)

魔法先生ネギま! (Mahō Sensei Negima!)
- Genre: Adventure, fantasy, harem
- Manga
- Written by: Ken Akamatsu
- Published by: Kodansha
- English publisher: NA: Kodansha Comics; UK: Tanoshimi
- Imprint: Shōnen Magazine Comics
- Magazine: Weekly Shōnen Magazine
- Original run: February 26, 2003 – March 14, 2012
- Volumes: 38
Further information
Original video animation
Mahō Sensei Negima! Introduction Film
Directed by	Hiroshi Nishikiori
Studio	Xebec
Released	August 25, 2004 – March 24, 2005
Episodes	3
Anime television series
Directed by	Nagisa Miyazaki (#1–13); Nobuyoshi Habara (#14–26) (Note: Production Director (プロダクションディレクター) for episodes 14 through 17, and Chief Director (チーフディレクター) for episodes 18 through 26.)
Produced by	Shinichi Ikeda (Yomiko Advertising); Takatoshi Chino (Xebec); Yōsuke Gorōmaro (#14–26, King Records)
Written by	Ichirō Ōkouchi
Music by	Shinkichi Mitsumune
Studio	Xebec
Licensed by	AUS: Madman Entertainment; NA: Sentai Filmworks (expired); UK: Revelation Films
Original network	TV Tokyo
English network	US: Funimation Channel, Anime Selects on Demand; ZA: Animax, SABC 2
Original run	January 6, 2005 – June 29, 2005
Episodes	26
Original video animation
Negima!? Magister Negi Magi: Spring
Directed by	Akiyuki Shinbo (Note: Chief Director (総監督).); Shin Oonuma
Produced by	Gō Nakanishi (King Records)
Written by	Kenichi Kanemaki
Music by	Kei Haneoka
Studio	Shaft
Licensed by	NA: Sentai Filmworks (expired); UK: Manga Entertainment
Released	October 25, 2006
Runtime	25 minutes
Original video animation
Negima!? Magister Negi Magi: Summer
Directed by	Akiyuki Shinbo; Shin Oonuma
Produced by	Gō Nakanishi (King Records)
Written by	Katsuhiko Takayama
Music by	Kei Haneoka
Studio	Shaft (Note: Production assistance (制作協力) provided by Studio Pastoral.)
Licensed by	NA: Sentai Filmworks (expired); UK: Manga Entertainment
Released	November 22, 2006
Runtime	28 minutes
Television drama
Magister Negi Magi Mahō Sensei Negima!
Directed by	Ryu Kaneda
Studio	Deep Side
Original network	TV Tokyo
Original run	October 4, 2006 – March 27, 2007
Episodes	26
Original video animation
Mahō Sensei Negima!: Shiroki Tsubasa Ala Alba
Directed by	Akiyuki Shinbo; Hiroaki Tomita (#1); Yukihiro Miyamoto (#2); Tomoyuki Itamura (#3)
Produced by	Gō Nakanishi (King Records); Yōichi Ishimoto; Noboru Ōno
Written by	Ken Akamatsu
Music by	Hajime Kikuchi
Studio	Shaft; Studio Pastoral
Released	August 17, 2008 – February 17, 2009
Runtime	30 minutes
Episodes	3
Original video animation
Mahō Sensei Negima!: Mō Hitotsu no Sekai
Directed by	Akiyuki Shinbo; Kōbun Shizuno (#1–2); Tomokazu Tokoro (#3–4); Tatsufumi Itou (#5)
Produced by	Gō Nakanishi (King Records); Noboru Ōno; Kensuke Tateishi (Kodansha)
Written by	Ken Akamatsu
Music by	Kei Haneoka
Studio	Shaft; Studio Pastoral
Released	September 17, 2009 – November 17, 2010
Runtime	29 minutes
Episodes	5
Anime film
Mahō Sensei Negima! Anime Final
Directed by	Akiyuki Shinbo (Note: Credited in promotional material and the film's streaming version credits, but not listed in the BluRay version credits.); Kenichi Ishikura (Note: Assistant Director (副監督). See the Shaft directors credit legend.)
Produced by	Noboru Ōno; Kensuke Tateishi (Kodansha); Haruki Hayashi (King Records)
Written by	Akiyuki Shinbo; Shaft (Note: Credited under the collective pen name Fuyashi Tō.); Deko Akao
Music by	Kei Haneoka
Studio	Studio Pastoral; Shaft (Note: Production assistance (制作協力) provided by Xebec and Zexcs.)
Released	August 27, 2011
Runtime	76 minutes
Related
UQ Holder! (sequel); Negima!? (anime alternative story); Negiho (manga alternative story)
- icon

Negima! Magister Negi Magi, known in Japan as Magical Teacher Negima! (Japanese: 魔法先生ネギま!, Hepburn: Mahō Sensei Negima!), is a Japanese manga series written and illustrated by Ken Akamatsu. It was serialized in Kodansha's shōnen manga magazine Weekly Shōnen Magazine from February 2003 to March 2012, with its chapters collected into 38 tankōbon volumes.

Negima! was adapted into a 26-episode anime television series produced by Xebec and broadcast on TV Tokyo from January to June 2005. Shaft produced an alternate retelling, this second 26-episode series being titled Negima!? and broadcast on TV Tokyo from October 2006 to March 2007. In addition, four different sets of original video animations, an anime film and a live-action television series have also been produced.

In North America, the manga was licensed for English language release by Del Rey Manga and later by Kodansha USA. In the UK the first sixteen volumes were published by Tanoshimi. Both anime and the second OVAs were licensed by Funimation. Sentai Filmworks re-licensed the series in 2018. In 2023, Sentai lost the licenses to Negima and it was removed from Hidive.

Akamatsu collaborated with an artist named Yui to write the spin-off Negiho in 2010. In 2013, Akamatsu began a sequel/spin off titled UQ Holder! that focuses on Negi's grandson, Tōta Konoe. Due to the two anime series and live action TV shows having plots that are totally different from that of the manga and the existence of spin-off manga that are fresh new takes of the Negima plot, Negima has become subject to transmedia storytelling.

== Plot ==
While looking for clues about his missing father Nagi, Negi Springfield becomes the English and homeroom teacher for Mahora Academy Class 2A (later 3A). Negi soon becomes acquainted with most of his new students including his roommates Asuna Kagurazaka and Konoka Konoe. Negi faces his first real challenge in his student Evangeline A.K. McDowell who is an immortal vampiress and one of his father's enemies. To help Negi confront Eva, Asuna agrees to become his temporary partner by performing a "Pactio", a kind of magical contract sealed with a kiss.

After dealing with Evangeline, Negi takes the class on a trip to Kyoto while searching for more information on his father's whereabouts but is forced to fight against Eastern mages aiming to kidnap Konoka with the help of other students who also become his partners including Nodoka Miyazaki, Konoka's childhood friend Setsuna Sakurazaki, and lastly with Konoka herself. The arc also introduces Fate Averruncus, another mage who looks to be around Negi's age but proves himself to be far stronger than him. Seeing his own weakness after the events in Kyoto, Negi begins to train with several students in order to become stronger while Kotaro Inugami, one of the foes he confronted there unexpectedly reappears and finds himself a family with Negi's students Natsumi and Chizuru. Kotaro also joins Negi against Wilheim, an old evil from the past who like Fate Averruncus, seems to be a pawn of an even stronger enemy.

During Mahora's cultural festival, Negi manages to partake in simultaneous events thanks to his student Chao Lingshen's latest invention, the time machine Casseopeia. One of these events is the "Mahora Martial Arts Tournament" where he confronts a series of increasingly stronger enemies including a former member of "Ala Rubra" (Crimson Wing), a legendary brigade led by his father. After the tournament, Negi takes part in more activities at the festival until Chao she reveals herself as a time-traveler who claims she must change the present to avert a great catastrophe in the future. Despite that, Negi and his allies confront Chao and stop her. After giving, Chao bids farewell before returning to her own time.

After the festival, Negi decides to go to the Mundus Magicus (Magic World) to look for his father. His partners decide to accompany him and together they form their own brigade, the Ala Alba (White Wing). They are joined by Negi's childhood friend Anya and accidentally by other students who are oblivious to his secret. As they arrive, the team is ambushed by a group of mysterious enemies led by Fate Averruncus, leaving Negi and his group defeated and scattered across Mundus Magicus. After meeting Jack Rakan, another member of Ala Rubra, Negi decides to train in order to become stronger and specializes in Dark Magic, like Evangeline. Meanwhile, Negi's lost companions start to learn the ropes of their new environment and eventually reunite with him.

During another clash with Fate and his companions, Asuna is captured by the enemy and held captive along with Anya, with a body double posing as the real Asuna. Later Negi has an encounter with Kurt Gödel, a former member of Ala Rubra who reveals to him the story of his parents including how his mother was unjustly tried and sentenced to death before being saved by Nagi at the brink of her execution. He also learns that the Magic World is actually a magically created, inhabitable version of Mars, and just like the world itself, the majority of its inhabitants are created by magic. During another clash with Fate, Negi also learns that the main objective of his group "Cosmo Entelecheia" is to make use of Asuna's secret powers to erase the magically created inhabitants of Mundus Magicus and transfer the rest of its population to Earth before it eventually collapses.

By joining forces with the various armies of the Magic World, the members of Ala Alba storm Cosmo Entelecheia's stronghold where Asuna and Anya are being held captive, to stop their plans. During the confrontation a magic gate is opened to Earth just above Mahora, having Negi's remaining students who stayed behind along with the academy's faculty members joining the fight. After rescuing Asuna and convincing Fate to accept a plan to save the people of the Magic World without the need of any sacrifices, Negi discovers that the true leader of Cosmo Entelecheia is none other than his father Nagi, possessed by the Mage of the Beginning, who vanishes after asking his son to look for him and release him once and for all.

After being celebrated as heroes for stopping Cosmo Entelecheia, Negi and his friends return to the academy, but instead of resuming his duties as a teacher, Negi leaves Fate as his substitute and with the help of some of his students he starts working on his plan to terraform Mars for the people of the decaying Magic World to relocate there. The plan involves sealing Asuna's body for one hundred years, and she bids farewell to Negi and the other students after she graduates from middle school. Waking up 30 years after the estimated time, Asuna finds that Negi's plan was a success and that Negi and all her classmates had happy and bountiful lives, but had long since died, all except for the immortal Evangeline, and Chao who exists in this time and has since invented a device to jump between realities. These two appear before Asuna to take her back to the present so she can live out her days with Negi and the others.

Seven Years later, Negi and gang defeat the Mage of the Beginning for good and Negi's father was no longer possessed by him. Negi finally reunites with his father as Ala Alba and Ala Rubra bond together as they celebrate their victory.

== Media ==
=== Manga ===
Negima! Magister Negi Magi, written and illustrated by Ken Akamatsu, was serialized in Kodansha's shōnen manga magazine Weekly Shōnen Magazine from February 26, 2003, to March 14, 2012. Kodansha collected its 355 individual chapters in thirty-eight tankōbon volumes, released from July 16, 2003, to May 17, 2012.

==== English version ====
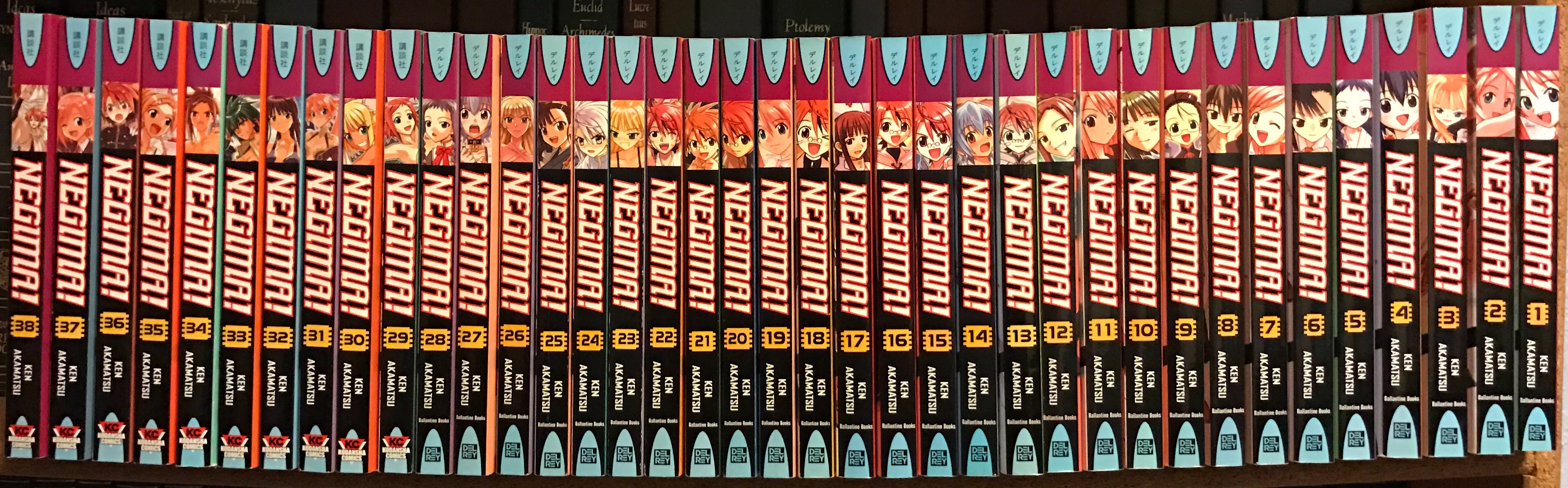
All 38 volumes of Negima as published in English

In North America, the series was licensed for English language release by Del Rey Manga. Del Rey announced that the series would be censored, however, it was later stated that it would be uncensored but shrink-wrapped with a label stating "Contains Explicit Content, Ages 16+" on the volumes' cover. Akamatsu stated that he was not angry with the edits, but rather amused. From volume 13 onwards the manga was published without the shrink-wrap. Del Rey published the first 28 volumes from April 27, 2004, to October 26, 2010. In October 2010, Kodansha USA announced that they would take over Del Rey titles, including Negima!. Kodansha USA release the remaining 29–38 volumes from May 17, 2011, to April 23, 2013. Kodansha also republished the first twenty-seven volumes in nine omnibus volumes from June 14, 2011, to February 11, 2014.

In the United Kingdom, the first sixteen volumes of the manga were published by Tanoshimi from August 3, 2006, to December 6, 2007.

=== Anime ===
==== Introduction original video animations ====
Before the beginning of the series, three original video animations (OVAs) were produced to introduce the characters. The first two were released on DVD bundled with two drama CDs, with the third being sold separately.

The first OVA is a re-enactment of the first chapter, where Negi first learns of his job as a teacher and is introduced to the students of Mahora Academy 2-A. It ends with profiles of the Baka Rangers (Asuna, Makie, Yue, Ku Fei and Kaede) as well as Ayaka.

The second OVA is a re-enactment of the "love potion" incident of chapter 2, with profiles at the end of Nodoka, Konoka, the cheerleaders (Misa, Madoka, Sakurako) as well as Kazumi.

The third OVA is a re-enactment of chapter 13: Negi's Mahora tour with the Narutaki twins. The tour shows Negi to several of the students (Yuna, Akira, Chao, Satsuki, Satomi, Chizuru, Natsumi, Zazie) as well as others that he ends up missing (Sayo, Evangeline, Chachamaru, Chisame, Misora, Ako). After being chewed out by Haruna for completely skipping her, a final scene introduces Setsuna and Mana.

==== Television series ====
The anime began airing in Japan on January 6, 2005, and ended June 29, 2005. The anime follows the story of the manga to a certain degree but also creates its own reasons for certain events happening - most of which take place towards the end of the series - which differ from the original story, as the situations addressed had yet to occur in the source material. The differences between the manga and anime are significant, and most events in the manga never occur in the anime, again due in part to the manga being incomplete during the series' production. Starting in episode 22 and continuing until the end of the series, original work was created so the series would have a conclusion. At one time it aired as part of the Funimation programming block on CoLours TV.

A second series was announced on May 9, 2006, by Shaft and directed by Akiyuki Shinbo, the director of Pani Poni Dash! and Tsukuyomi -Moon Phase-. It started airing in Japan on October 4, 2006. Negima!? is an alternate story with different character designs and an all new storyline, albeit with the same characters. The show also focuses more towards breaking the fourth wall, action, and comedy, and less on the original series' fanservice.

==== Spring and Summer OVAs ====
Two OVAs directed by Akiyuki Shinbo and produced by Shaft have been released, a Spring OVA and a Summer OVA. Both OVA's were released on DVD in English dub on October 14, 2008.

The Spring OVA called Negima!? Haru was shown to a private audience in Japan in April 2006 and was released for the public in DVD on October 25, 2006. It is based on the trip to the Southern Islands in volume 7 of the manga. The story is about how Negi makes up to Asuna after saying to Asuna that she should not mind his business.

The Summer (Natsu) OVA was also shown to a private audience in September 2006, and the DVD was released on November 22, 2006. The beginning is about Nodoka and Yue practicing casting a spell. While training, Yue convinces Nodoka that they cast a spell of the red string of fate on Nodoka. A spell which shows them who her future partner will be. One end connects to Nodoka and the other end connects to Negi. Unfortunately, this spell is not a fate connection, but just a tie-up. The rest of the OVA are about how Nodoka and Negi spend the rest of the day trying to take their bath while their hands are tied together.

==== White Wing OADs ====
A third set of OVAs (officially an "OAD" or "Original Animation Disc" as these are limited edition OVA releases that are only sold with the purchase of specific volumes of the manga) called Magical Teacher Negima! ~The White Wing~ (魔法先生ネギま!〜白き翼 ALA ALBA〜, Mahō Sensei Negima! ~Shiroki Tsubasa Ala Alba~) was announced by Ken Akamatsu on his website days after the end of the live-action adaptation's airing. Production was handled by Shaft in cooperation with Studio Pastoral and the entire cast from Negima!? reprised their roles. The new OVAs cover chapters 176 to 183, and are shown in three parts:

1. The first OAD covers chapters 176 and 177 and was released on August 12, 2008, together with the release of Volume 23 of the manga.
2. The second OAD covers chapters 178 to 180 and was released on November 17, 2008, together with the release of Volume 24 of the manga.
  1. A limited edition Negima audio drama CD was released on December 19, 2008, and covers chapter 181.
3. The third OAD shows chapters 181 to 183 and was released on February 17, 2009, together with the release of Volume 25 of the manga.

Just like previous Negima adaptations by Shaft, Akiyuki Shinbo served as the director, together with the same staff as his previous works.

From the Negi no Ochakai event that was held in May 2008, Ken Akamatsu mentioned that if pre-orders for the first of the OADs exceed 50,000 the staff would consider a film adaptation, and if it exceeded 100,000 views, the staff would consider a third animated series. The counter on the official website reached 82,581 before the first OAD was released. The total sales of three volumes was 245,000 copies.

==== Another World OADs ====
A fourth set of OADs was announced in the Mahō Sensei Negima: Ala Alba event held on February 11, 2009. The series is officially titled Magical Teacher Negima! ~Another World~ (魔法先生ネギま！もうひとつの世界, Mahō Sensei Negima: Mō Hitotsu no Sekai). This OAD series, covering the Journey to Magic World arc, was exclusively bundled with the manga starting with volume 27. The first episode, adapting chapters 184 through 188, was released on September 17, 2009; the second, which adapts chapters 189 through 192, was released on December 17, 2009. The third, covering chapters 193–204, was released on May 17, 2010, the fourth on August 17, 2010, and the fifth was released on November 17, 2010. Just like the previous OAD adaption, this series is produced by Shaft in cooperation with Studio Pastoral.

==== Film ====
Akamatsu announced in his web diary that they can now initiate "the project" freely because the number of the pre-orders of the new OAD Mahou Sensei Negima! Mō Hitotsu no Sekai was large enough. He said he could not explicitly disclose what "the project" is from now since the sales data turned Akamatsu's personal desire into a real project. He had been saying that the final chapter of the OAD series will be released as a movie if the sales are successful. Weekly Shōnen Magazine announced a "full-length" anime that would be premiered in 2011 and used the term "Negima Saga Final".

On May 17, 2011, the official site opened with the new title Mahō Sensei Negima: Anime Final and was released in Japanese theaters on August 27, 2011, as a double-bill with Hayate the Combat Butler! Heaven Is a Place on Earth. The movie provided an alternate ending to the Journey to Magic World arc. A CD was released on August 24, 2011, featuring the theme songs of the movie along with the off vocal versions.

=== Live-action series ===
A live-action series of Mahō Sensei Negima!, distinguished from the manga, first anime television series (Negima!, having an exclamation mark) and the second anime television series (Negima!?, having the equivalent of an interrobang) by having two exclamation marks joined at the dot (or, Negima!!). The cast of all of the 31 girls was released in July 2007, while it is announced later that actress Yukina Kashiwa would play Negi, Hiroshi would portray Takamichi T. Takahata, former AV star Nao Oikawa as Shizuna Minamoto, and Gajirō Satō as the school dean. It started in TV Tokyo's late-night timeslot on October 3, 2007, and ran for 25 episodes. The 26th announced episode was a DVD exclusive.

Like Negima!?, the live-action series has an entirely different storyline from the manga and the first anime series.

=== Music ===
A large amount of music related to Negima! has been released. Aside from the numerous opening and ending theme songs used in the two anime adaptations, four OVA sets and the film, several character songs have been released.

=== Video games ===
Negi Springfield appears as a playable character in the 2009 PlayStation Portable fighting game Sunday vs Magazine: Shūketsu! Chōjō Daikessen.
