= Monica Rial filmography =

Monica Rial is an American voice actress who made her debut in 1999. Among the list exclusive to either main characters she has played, or minor characters with recurring roles, Rial has voiced the leading or supporting roles of Bulma in Dragon Ball, Tsuyu Asui (Froppy) in My Hero Academia, Mirajane Strauss in Fairy Tail, Tanya von Degurechaff in The Saga of Tanya the Evil and Suu in Monster Musume.

== Anime ==
=== 1999–2005 ===
List of voice performances and production work in anime
Year	Title	Role	Crew role, Notes	Source
1999	Martian Successor Nadesico	Mikako, Miss Kobayashi	Debut roles	
2000	Gasaraki	Miharu		
2000	Generator Gawl	Natsume		
2001	Princess Nine	Izumi Himuro		
2002	Excel Saga	Hyatt		
2002	Steel Angel Kurumi	Saki		
2003	Blue Seed Beyond	Momiji Fujimiya		
2003	Angelic Layer	Tamayo Kizaki		
2003	Those Who Hunt Elves II	Bruno, Presiding Judge		
2003	Najica Blitz Tactics	Lila		
2003	Noir	Kirika Yuumura		
2003	RahXephon	Haruka Shitou		
2003	Full Metal Panic! series	Kyoko Tokiwa		
2004	Aquarian Age: Sign for Evolution	Yoriko Sannou		
2004	Azumanga Daioh	Minamo "Nyamo" Kurosawa		
2004	Case Closed	Amy Yeager, Jessica "Jessie" Star, others		
2004	D.N.Angel	Towa	ADR script writer	
2004	Fullmetal Alchemist	Lyra / Dante		
2004	Kiddy Grade	Lumière		
2004	Neon Genesis Evangelion	Maya Ibuki	Director's Cut	
2004	Spiral	Rio Takeuchi		
2004	Parasite Dolls	Reiko Michaelson		
2005	Hello Kitty's Animation Theater	Hello Kitty		
2005	A Tree of Palme	Mu		
2005	Burst Angel	Jo		
2005	Ghost Stories	Momoko Koigakubo		
2005	Godannar	Mira Ackerman		
2005	Gunslinger Girl	Angelica		
2005	Kodocha	Aya Sugita		

=== 2006–2010 ===
List of voice performances and production work in anime
Year	Title	Role	Crew role, Notes	Source
2006	Rumbling Hearts	Mayu Tamano		
2006	Black Cat	Kyoko Kirisaki		
2006	D.Gray-man	Lero, Lulu Bell, Chomesuke		
2006	Gatchaman		ADR script writer	
2006	Madlax		ADR script writer	
2006	Nanaka 6/17	Nanaka Kirisato		
2006	Negima!	Konoka Konoe, Kazumi Asakura, Satsuki Yosuba	Also Negima!?	
2006	Shin-chan	Ai Suotome	Funimation dub	
2006	Speed Grapher	Kagura Tennōzu		
2006	The Super Dimension Fortress Macross	Misa Hayase		
2006	Moon Phase	Hazuki/Luna		
2007	Air	Misuzu Kamio		
2007	Air Gear	Simca		
2007	Pani Poni Dash!	Sayaka "Number 6" Suzuki		
2007	Kurau: Phantom Memory	Kurau Amami		
2007	Tsubasa: Reservoir Chronicle	Sakura		
2007	Witchblade	Maria	ADR script writer	
2008	Ouran High School Host Club	Renge Houshakuji		
2008	One Piece	Karoo, Kuina, Tashigi, Bulma, Additional Voices	Funimation dub	
2008	Sasami: Magical Girls Club	Misao Shinohara		
2008	Shuffle!	Asa Shigure		
2009	Nabari no Ou	Shinra Banshou	ADR Director	
2009	El Cazador de la Bruja	Lirio		
2010	Fullmetal Alchemist: Brotherhood	May Chang		
2010	Initial D	Sayuki	Funimation dub	
2010	Dragon Ball Z Kai	Bulma	Funimation dub	
2010	Birdy the Mighty: Decode	Christella Revi	ADR script writer	
2010	Strike Witches	Chris		
2010	Rin: Daughters of Mnemosyne	Sayara Yamanobe		
2010	Casshern Sins	Ringo		
2010	Soul Eater	Tsubaki Nakatsukasa	Also Soul Eater Not!	
2010	Sekirei	Miya Asama		
2010	Hetalia: Axis Powers	Belarus		

=== 2011–2015 ===
List of voice performances and production work in anime
Year	Title	Role	Crew role, Notes	Source
2011	Highschool of the Dead	Shizuka Marikawa		
2011	Chaos;Head	Shino Hazuki	Also Chaos;Child	
2011	Chrome Shelled Regios	Felli Loss		
2011	Infinite Stratos	Houki Shinonono		
2011	Dance in the Vampire Bund	Mina Tepeş		
2011	Fairy Tail	Mirajane Strauss	Lead Writer; ADR Script Writer (episodes 1–193)	
2011	Heaven's Lost Property series	Daedalus		
2011	Rosario + Vampire series	Yukari Sendo		
2011	Nakaimo - My Sister Is Among Them!	Konoe Tsuruma		
2012	A Certain Magical Index series	Index		
2012	Cat Planet Cuties	Aoi Futaba		
2012	Deadman Wonderland	Shiro		
2012	Campione!	Erica Blandelli		
2012	Freezing	Attia Simmons		
2012	Ōkami-san and her Seven Companions	Ringo Akai		
2012	Panty & Stocking with Garterbelt	Stocking		
2012	Shakugan no Shana	Pheles	Seasons 2–3	
2012	Black Butler II	Mey-Rin		
2012	C – Control – The Money and Soul of Possibility	Q		
2013	A Certain Scientific Railgun series	Index		
2013	Aesthetica of a Rogue Hero	Kuzuha Doumoto		
2013	Eureka Seven AO	Noa		
2013	Guilty Crown	Tsugumi		
2013	Kokoro Connect	Iori Nagase		
2013	Maken-ki! series	Haruko Amaya		
2013	Michiko & Hatchin	Michiko Malandro		
2013	Tenchi Muyo! War on Geminar	Doll		
2013	Another	Mei Misaki		
2013	Is This a Zombie? series	Head Teacher		
2013	Sankarea: Undying Love	Babu		
2013	Appleseed XIII	Deia Chades		
2013	Aquarion Evol	Shush		
2013	Future Diary	Kamado Ueshita (8th)		
2013	Last Exile: Fam, the Silver Wing	Sara		
2014	Date A Live series	Mii Fujibakama		
2014	Kamisama Kiss	Numano Himemiko		
2014	WataMote	Tomoko Kuroki		
2014	MM!	Mio Isurugi		
2014	Psycho-Pass 2	Mizue Shisui		
2014	Robotics;Notes	Junna Daitoku		
2014	Rozen Maiden Zurücksplen	Kanaria		
2014	Senran Kagura	Homura		
2014	Majestic Prince	Tamaki Irie		
2014	Hetalia: The Beautiful World	Female England (Nyotalia)		
2014	Diabolik Lovers	Cordelia		
2015	Dog & Scissors	Yayoi Honda		
2015	Love, Chunibyo & Other Delusions series	Kuzuha Togashi		
2015	Gangsta.	Sig		
2015	High School DxD	Venelana Gremory	Seasons 3–4	
2015	Nobunagun	DOGOO		
2015	Tokyo Ghoul	Rize Kamishiro	Script Writer	
2015	Tokyo Ravens	Kon		
2015	Unbreakable Machine-Doll	Henriette Belew		
2015	Yona of the Dawn	Yona	Script Writer	
2015	Assassination Classroom	Kaede Kayano	Also Koro-sensei Q!	
2015	Blood Blockade Battlefront	Sonic		
2015	D-Frag!	Azuma Matsubara		
2015	Danganronpa: The Animation	Sayaka Maizono		
2015	Death Parade	Misaki Tachibana	Ep. 4	
2015	Maid Sama!	Misaki Ayuzawa		
2015	Mikagura School Suite	Eruna Ichinomiya		
2015	Ninja Slayer From Animation	Yamoto Koki		
2015	selector infected WIXOSS	Tama	Also selector spread WIXOSS	
2015	Show by Rock!! series	Moa		
2015	Super Sonico	Fuuri Watanuki		
2015	The Rolling Girls	Yukina Kosaka		
2015	Ultimate Otaku Teacher	Kanan Chinami		
2015	Wanna Be the Strongest in the World	Elena Miyazawa		
2015	Yurikuma Arashi	Ginko Yurishiro		
2015	Sky Wizards Academy		Head Writer	
2015	Seraph of the End	Krul Tepes	ADR script writer Lead Writer (season 2)	
2015	Riddle Story of Devil	Chitaru Namatame		
2015	Beyond the Boundary	Mitsuki Nase		

=== 2016–2020 ===
List of voice performances and production work in anime
Year	Title	Role	Crew role, Notes	Source
2016	Hanayamata	Yaya Sasame		
2016	Lord Marksman and Vanadis	Valentina Glinka Estes		
2016	Pandora in the Crimson Shell: Ghost Urn	Uzal Delilah		
2016	Garo: The Animation	Ema Guzmán		
2016	Snow White with the Red Hair	Umihebi		
2016	Dimension W	Claire Skyheart	Ep. 3	
2016	My Neighbor Seki	Rumi Yokoi		
2016	My Hero Academia	Tsuyu Asui / Froppy		
2016	Love Live! Sunshine!!	Mito Takami		
2016	And You Thought There Is Never a Girl Online?	Yui Saito		
2016	Den-noh Coil	Yūko "Isako" Amasawa		
2016	First Love Monster	Mafuyu Hayashi		
2016	Shimoneta	Anna Nishikinomiya		
2016	Puzzle & Dragons X	Morgan		
2016	Chaos Dragon	Shoren		
2016	Aoharu x Machinegun	Hotaru Tachibana		
2016	Keijo!!!!!!!!	Hitomi Hokuto	Lead Writer	
2016	Monthly Girls' Nozaki-kun	Yuu Kashima		
2016	Rampo Kitan: Game of Laplace	Hanabishi		
2016	Drifters	EASY		
2016	Yuri!!! on Ice	Mila Babicheva		
2016	Tales of Zestiria the X	Seres		
2017	Dragon Ball Super	Bulma, Seer, Future Bulma	Funimation dub	
2017	Garo: Crimson Moon	Seimei		
2017	Valkyrie Drive: Mermaid	Charlotte Scharsen		
2017	Aria the Scarlet Ammo AA	Kirin Shima		
2017	Akiba's Trip: The Animation	Tejasvi Latu		
2017	Saga of Tanya the Evil	Tanya Degurechaff		
2017	Hand Shakers	Bind	Script Writer	
2017	Fūka	Yamada	Eps. 2–4	
2017	Masamune-kun's Revenge	Yoshino Koiwai		
2017	Chain Chronicle: The Light of Haecceitas	Eirenus		
2017	Akashic Records of Bastard Magic Instructor	Rumia Tingel		
2017	Love Tyrant	Yuzu Kichōgasaki	Script Writer	
2017	Tsukigakirei	Saori Mizuno		
2017	Brave Witches	Aleksandra Ivanovna Pokryshkin		
2017	WorldEnd	Elq-Hrqstn		
2017	Gosick	Carmilla, Morella	Eps. 17, 23	
2017	The Silver Guardian	Twin Star, Shin, Wei		
2017	Clockwork Planet	AnchoR		
2017	Monster Musume	Suu		
2017	KanColle: Kantai Collection	Akatsuki		
2017	18if	Yuko Sakurabe		
2017	Space Patrol Luluco	Lalaco Godspeed		
2017	Saiyuki Reload Blast	Talche		
2017	Hina Logi ~from Luck & Logic~	Rino Fujisaki		
2017	Sakura Quest	Constanza	Ep. 16	
2017	Chronos Ruler	Ice Raider		
2017	Restaurant to Another World	Kuro		
2017	Taboo Tattoo	Bluesy Fluesy		
2017	Hundred	Vitaly Tynyanov		
2017	Juni Taisen: Zodiac War	Ryōka Niwa / Rooster		
2017	Urahara	Misa Maruno		
2017	In Another World With My Smartphone	Leen		
2017	Black Clover	Nero	Ep. 7	
2017	Garo: Vanishing Line	Queen		
2017	Tanaka-kun is Always Listless	Miyano		
2018	Food Wars! The Second Plate	Jun Shiomi		
2018	Cardcaptor Sakura: Clear Card	Sakura Kinomoto		
2018	Death March to the Parallel World Rhapsody	Arisa		
2018	Pop Team Epic	Pipimi	Ep. 5a	
2018	Junji Ito Collection	Tomie Kawakami		
2018	Steins;Gate 0	Maho Hiyajo		
2018	Golden Kamuy	Asirpa		
2018	Made in Abyss	Mitty		
2018	UQ Holder! Magister Negi Magi 2	Konoka Konoe, Kazumi Asakura, Satsuki Yosuba, Dana Ananga Jagannatha		
2018	Radiant	Alma		
2018	Concrete Revolutio	Campe	Ep. 2	
2018	SSSS.Gridman	Anosillus the 2nd		
2018	Kakuriyo no Yadomeshi	Yodoko		
2019	Black Clover	Mereoleona Vermillion		
2019	Nichijou	Nano Shinonome		
2019	Mitsuboshi Colors	Saki Kise		
2019	My Teen Romantic Comedy SNAFU Too!	Mrs. Yuigahama		
2019	How Clumsy you are, Miss Ueno	Yamashita		
2019	Why the Hell are You Here, Teacher?!	Hikari Hazakura		
2019	Radiant	Alma		
2020	Bofuri	Drazō		
2020	ID:Invaded	Koharu Hondomachi/Miyo Hijiriido		
2020	The Demon Girl Next Door	Yuko "Shamiko" Yoshida		
2020	Fruits Basket	Mine Kuramae	2019 reboot	
2020	Uzaki-chan Wants to Hang Out!	Hana Uzaki		

=== 2021–present ===
List of voice performances and production work in anime
Year	Title	Role	Crew role, Notes	Source
2021	Sakura Wars the Animation	Kaoru Rindo		
2021	Log Horizon	Lelia Mofur		
2021	Adachi and Shimamura	Taeko Nagafuji		
2021	Combatants Will Be Dispatched!	Alice Kisaragi		
2021	The Saint's Magic Power is Omnipotent	Marie		
2021	The Dungeon of Black Company	Narrator		
2021	SSSS.Dynazenon	The 2nd		
2021	Kageki Shojo!!	Chika Sawada		
2022	Kakegurui ××	Terano Totobami	Sentai Filmworks dub	
2022	Tomodachi Game	Tsukino		
2022	The Dawn of the Witch	Los		
2022	Aoashi	Noriko Aoi		
2022	Tsukimichi: Moonlit Fantasy	Shen/Tomoe		
2022	A Couple of Cuckoos	Ritsuko Amano		
2022	Lucifer and the Biscuit Hammer	Hisame Asahina, Muu		
2022	Vermeil in Gold	Vermeil		
2022	Raven of the Inner Palace	Xing-Xing		
2022	Call of the Night	Niko Hirata		
2023	Farming Life in Another World	Tia		
2023	Reborn as a Vending Machine, I Now Wander the Dungeon	Missus		
2023	TenPuru	Akemitsu (young), Nyagosuke		
2023	The Apothecary Diaries	Ah-Duo, Narrator		
2024	Chillin' in Another World with Level 2 Super Cheat Powers	Belano		
2024	My Instant Death Ability Is So Overpowered	Tomochika		
2024	Fairy Tail: 100 Years Quest	Mirajane Strauss		
2024	Chained Soldier	Rairen, Sahara		
2024	Level 1 Demon Lord and One Room Hero	Denetra/Sezek		
2024	Tying the Knot with an Amagami Sister	Yae Amagami		
2025	Dragon Ball Daima	Bulma		
2025	Loner Life in Another World	Touka Tsuyuri		
2025	Failure Frame	Eve Speed		
2025	Yakuza Fiancé: Raise wa Tanin ga Ii	Nao		
2025	From Bureaucrat to Villainess: Dad's Been Reincarnated!	Grenat		
2025	To Be Hero X	Miss Zhao		
2025	Let's Play	Angela		
2025	The Dark History of the Reincarnated Villainess	Satou's Mom		
2025	Bad Girl	Yuu Yuutani		
2025	Hero Without a Class: Who Even Needs Skills?!	Reiner		

== Film ==
List of voice performances in feature films
Year	Title	Role	Notes	Source
2014	Dragon Ball Z: Battle of Gods	Bulma, Seer	Limited theatrical release	
2015	Dragon Ball Z: Resurrection 'F'	Bulma, Seer	Limited theatrical release	
2016	The Boy and the Beast	Chiko		
2016	Harmony	Miach Mihie		
2018	My Hero Academia: Two Heroes	Tsuyu Asui	Limited theatrical release	
2019	Dragon Ball Super: Broly	Bulma	Limited theatrical release	
2019	One Piece: Stampede	Tashigi	Limited theatrical release	
2020	My Hero Academia: Heroes Rising	Tsuyu Asui	Limited theatrical release	
2022	Dragon Ball Super: Super Hero	Bulma		

List of voice performances in direct-to-video and television films
Year	Title	Role	Notes	Source
2005	Dragon Ball Z: Broly - Second Coming	Coco		
2006	Case Closed: The Time Bombed Skyscraper	Amy Yeager		
2010	Dragon Ball: Curse of the Blood Rubies	Bulma	Funimation re-dub	
2012	Towa no Quon	Tei Ryumonji	OVA series	
2012	King of Thorn	Alice		
2012	Mass Effect: Paragon Lost	Treeya		
2016	Strike Witches: The Movie	Aleksandra Ivanovna Pokryshkin		

== Animation ==
List of voice performances in animation
Year	Title	Role	Notes	Source
2015	Aqua Teen Hunger Force Forever	Jubilee	Ep. "Knapsack!"	
2017	RWBY	Sienna Khan		
2019	Gen:LOCK	Raquel Marin		
2020	Recorded by Arizal	Tita Cherry		

== Video games ==
List of voice performances in video games
Year	Title	Role	Notes	Source
2003	Unlimited Saga	Marie, Silver Hair		Resume
2009	Lux-Pain	Natsuki		Resume
2009	Case Closed: The Mirapolis Investigation	Amy Yeager		
2009	Dragon Ball: Revenge of King Piccolo	Ghost Usher		
2010	Blazing Souls Accelate	Little Snow		Resume
2010	Dragon Ball Z: Tenkaichi Tag Team	Bulma		
2011	Monster Tale	Zoe		
2011	Ms. Splosion Man	Ms. Splosion Man		Resume
2011	Gunstringer	Lady of the Dead		Resume
2011	Dragon Ball Z: Ultimate Tenkaichi	Bulma		
2012	Tribes: Ascend	Diamond Sword		Resume
2012	Borderlands 2	Ms. Tediore, Morningstar		
2014	Borderlands: The Pre-Sequel!	R-D513, Rose Yin, Cleaning Bot, Flirty Bar Dame, Tediore		
2014	Smite	Hel, Sobek's Parrot		
2016	Dragon Ball Xenoverse 2	Bulma		
2017	Tales of Berseria	Bienfu, Seres		
2017	Fire Emblem Echoes: Shadows of Valentia	Mila		
2018	Dragon Ball FighterZ	Bulma		
2019	Dragon Ball Legends	Bulma		
2020	Dragon Ball Z: Kakarot	Bulma		
2021	Tales of Luminaria	Laplace		
2022	Phantom Breaker: Omnia	Fin		
2023	Fire Emblem Engage	Anna		
2025	Rune Factory: Guardians of Azuma	Hisui		
2025	Zenless Zone Zero	Seed		
