= List of Speed Grapher episodes =

The cover of the first English DVD compilation released by Funimation on July 4, 2006

The episodes of the Japanese anime television series Speed Grapher are directed by Kunihisa Sugishima, animated by Gonzo, and produced by TV Asahi. Speed Grapher has been adapted into a manga and a light novel. The series tells the story of former war photographer Tatsumi Saiga and his quest to save Kagura Tennōzu from Chōji Suitengu and the members of the fetish club, Roppongi Club. Kagura, the club's "goddess", can transform people into Euphorics, or people with their desired abilities granted, through her bodily fluids.

The series initially aired on TV Asahi between April 8, 2005, and September 30, 2005, in Japan. Sony Pictures Entertainment released the series to twelve DVD compilations, each featuring two episodes, between July 2005 and June 2006 in Japan for Region 2.

In the United States, Speed Grapher is licensed to Funimation (later Crunchyroll, LLC). Funimation released Speed Grapher to Region 1 to six DVD compilations, each containing four episodes, between July 2006 and March 2007. In addition, several "Limited Edition" DVDs were released on the same dates as the regular DVDs. On March 11, 2008, a box set containing all six of the previously released DVDs was released. On February 13, 2007, Funimation released the series to the iTunes USA store. On December 9, 2007, Independent Film Channel announced that it had licensed Speed Grapher for airing on TV from Funimation. The series aired between March 7 and August 15, 2008, in the United States.

Speed Grapher was also released to DVD in Region 2 for the United Kingdom by MVM Films between April 16, 2007, and February 4, 2008.

Each episode uses two pieces of theme music: one opening theme and one of two closing themes. "Girls on Film" by Duran Duran serves as the opening for all of the episodes. Episodes one through twelve use "Hill of Poppies" (ひなげしの丘, Hinageshi no Oka), by Shione Yukawa, as the ending theme, while episodes thirteen through twenty-four use "Break the Cocoon" by Yorico as the ending theme. Funimation was unable to obtain the rights for "Girls on Film" in the United States, however, due to restrictions on licensing. The opening theme for the English episodes is "Shutter Speed" by Shinkichi Mitsumune.

== Episode list ==
No.	Title	Original release date	English air date
1	"Depravity City"; Transliteration: "Haitokuto-shi" (Japanese: 背徳都市)	April 8, 2005	March 7, 2008
Tatsumi Saiga, a former war photographer, has resorted to photographing politicians for a tabloid to earn a living. While investigating, he discovers the bodies of several guards and two prominent politicians killed by a man who appeared to be made of rubber. After the investigation, Hibari Ginza, the policewoman in charge of the investigation, tries to seduce Saiga, but she is unsuccessful. While looking for information about the murders, Saiga learns of the existence of the Roppongi Club and its leader, Chōji Suitengu, from his boss. Saiga makes his way into the club while pursuing a Diet member and stumbles upon a ritual. Unable to resist, he photographs the girl at the center of the ritual, causing Suitengu, who was watching the ceremony, to order his men to kill Saiga. Saiga is captured, but the girl kisses him, stopping his executioners.
2	"Goddess of Greed"; Transliteration: "Unaru Satsutaba" (Japanese: 唸る札束)	April 15, 2005	March 14, 2008
Kagura Tennōzu, the girl at the center of the ritual, wakes up, frightened by her nightmare of a ritual. She rushes to get ready for school while her mother, Shinsen Tennōzu, taunts her for being late. At school, Kagura falls ill from malnourishment and has to go to the nurse, prompting her teacher to promise to talk to her mother. When Kagura returns home, she discovers her mother having sex with her teacher in Kagura's bed. Shinsen then proceeds to bribe Kagura's teacher into ignoring Kagura's malnourishment. Suitengu arrives to bring her to her piano lesson. There, he whispers a few words into Kagura's ear, causing Kagura to fall asleep.
3	"Film Like A Bullet"; Transliteration: "Shasatsu Bakusatsu" (Japanese: 写殺爆殺)	April 22, 2005	March 21, 2008
The club members and guards attempt to kill Saiga, but his wounds quickly heal. After discovering that he can cause explosions by taking a photo, Saiga kills the guards, destroys the hall. Grabbing Kagura, he escapes with her in his arms. When he finally is able to pause to rest on a bridge above water, Kagura awakens and panics over her situation. Suitengu arrives and tells Kagura that it is all just a dream but she jumps into the water below in panic and Saiga jumps in after her to save her. When they resurface outside of the club, she begs Saiga to show her true freedom, but Tsujido, Suitengu's right-hand man, shoots Saiga and captures Kagura. Kagura is returned to the Tennōzu Mansion, where Suitengu cages her.
4	"Lethal Headshot"; Transliteration: "Ryakudatsu Shōjo" (Japanese: 略奪少女)	April 29, 2005	March 28, 2008
Both Saiga and Suitengu's men unearth information about the other. Saiga asks Ginza to set up a trap for his pursuers and then sneaks into the mansion where Kagura is being held. When Suitengu's men attack Saiga's home, they walk straight into Ginza's trap and are arrested. At the Tennōzu Mansion, Saiga infiltrates the mansion, frees Kagura, and escapes. When Suitenu realizes this, he calls Katsuya Shirogane, who transforms into the rubber man. Kagura escapes alone after Saiga promises to reunite with her. During the fight, Shirogane seems to have the upper hand, but is ultimately killed. Under a billboard bearing a famed photo of Saiga's, Kagura and Saiga reunite.
5	"Whore of Diamonds"; Transliteration: "Daiyamondo Fujin" (Japanese: ダイヤモンド夫人)	May 6, 2005	April 4, 2008
Back at the mansion, Suitengu tells Shinsen that Kagura was captured. She shoots him as punishment and orders him to continue pursuing Kagura, so he calls in Kaoru Koganei, a wealthy socialite, to help capture Kagura. While searching, Tsujido smells Kagura's scent on a man who molested Kagura on the train so he, Niihari, Makabe, and Koganei begin pursuit. Saiga, foreseeing this, travels to another city via train to hide with the help of his neighbor's friend. Saiga and Kagura arrive at the show pub owned by Bob's male, cross-dressing "sister". Kagura quickly befriends the cross-dressing "showgirls", but before long, Koganei tracks them down and enters the pub.
6	"Out of Focus"; Transliteration: "Sayonara Daiyamondo Fujin" (Japanese: さよならダイヤモンド夫人)	May 13, 2005	April 11, 2008
Saiga's camera cannot focus on Koganei's diamond body, so he is unable to hurt her and is forced to flee. A high-speed chase ensues as Saiga tries to escape on a motorcycle, pursued by Suitengu's men in cars. Saiga uses his power to disable some of his pursuers, but Koganei eliminates the rest of them and severely wounds Saiga. She takes Kagura hostage and tells Suitengu to pay her a ransom. Before Suitengu can arrive, however, Saiga spray paints Koganei's body so his camera can focus and dismembers her. He leaves her alive and escapes with Kagura. Suitengu and his men arrive shortly after and Suitengu kills Koganei for betraying him.
7	"The Big Picture"; Transliteration: "Ryōki Doriru" (Japanese: 猟奇ドリル)	May 20, 2005	April 18, 2008
Ginza begins an investigation on Saiga's whereabouts, but is unable to make much progress when the delinquents she previously arrested are released. Meanwhile, Suitengu's men continue to pursue Saiga. Niihari calls on a dentist whose Euphoric power causes dental tools to grow out of his back. Saiga, looking for a place to rest, visits an old friend, Doctor Genba Ryougoku, who examines both Kagura and Saiga. While he is examining her, Ryougoku tells Kagura more about Saiga's past. At the same time, Saiga's boss tells Ginza the same information. Outside of Ryougoku's clinic, Saiga discovers more about his powers while experimenting with his camera equipment.
8	"Dentophobia"; Transliteration: "Kagura no Tomoshibi" (Japanese: 神楽のともし火)	May 27, 2005	April 25, 2008
Suitengu discusses his plans involving Kagura with his henchmen and Mizunokuchi, the dentist, agrees to retrieve her for a price. Back at the clinic, Ryougoku reveals that Kagura has only six months left to live due to a brain tumor. Suitengu's men attack unexpectedly and light the clinic on fire, interrupting Ryougoku and Saiga's talk. Kagura and Ryougoku hide in the basement while Saiga attempts to defend the clinic, but because of the smoke from the fire, Saiga's camera cannot focus properly. Mizunokuchi, hidden by the smoke, suddenly attacks, severely injuring Saiga. However, Saiga creates a hole in the wall to clear the smoke and, because he can focus his camera, gains the upper hand. With some help from Ryougoku, Saiga defeats Mizunokuchi and disables the men hiding in the woods before escaping.
9	"Into the Bath"; Transliteration: "Yudono nite" (Japanese: 湯殿にて)	June 3, 2005	May 2, 2008
Ginza continues investigating and progressively getting closer to Saiga. In the Tennōzu Mansion, Shinsen's mother exchanges words with Shinsen, bringing up painful memories of the past. Simultaneously, Saiga and Kagura's visit to a bath where Kagura's mother once stayed reveals her mother's past history with Kazuki Odawara, a doctor involved with genetic research. Odawara, who was supposed to propose to Shinsen, died in an accident and was unable to meet with her, causing her to gain her current bitter personality. Meanwhile, Suitengu's men continue to unsuccessfully search for Saiga and Kagura.
10	"Suitengu Cometh"; Transliteration: "Suitengu Kuru" (Japanese: 水天宮来る)	June 10, 2005	May 9, 2008
Kagura and Saiga visit an old research lab where Odawara once researched and make several startling discoveries about the genetic research that went on there. However, Suitengu's men arrive and Suitengu enters the building to fight Saiga. Saiga tells Kagura to escape. After she does, Suitengu reveals the source of Saiga's abilities: a virus that Kagura carries has mutated Saiga's DNA. He then attacks and heavily wounds Saiga, but Saiga manages to escape and is rescued by Ginza.
11	"Mother Critical"; Transliteration: "Haha Kitoku Sugu Kaere" (Japanese: ハハキトク スグカエレ)	June 17, 2005	May 16, 2008
Ginza retrieves Kagura after some minor struggles and returns her to an ailing Shinsen. After she tries to escape yet again, Ginza reveals her plan and takes Saiga away, leaving Kagura with Shinsen and Suitengu. Kagura is taken to Suitengu's research ship, where she is put to sleep and her body is kept from menstruating. Ginza rapes Saiga while he sleeps and Suitengu calms the members of the Club, assuring them that it will reopen shortly. After, Suitengu pledges his loyalty to Shinsen again. The backer of the Tennōzu Group dies in a boating "accident" and Tsujido contacts Ran Yurigaoka to plan to kill Saiga. Kagura awakens in the ship and hears of Suitengu's plans to marry Shinsen and Suitengu unveils the wedding dress to Shinsen.
12	"Left Hand Lullaby"; Transliteration: "Hidarite ni Idakarete Nemure" (Japanese: 左手に抱かれて眠れ)	June 24, 2005	May 23, 2008
In a flashback, Shinsen is revealed to have been genetically modified to become beautiful. Her mother claims that Shinsen betrayed her and caused her misery. Kagura tricks a scientist on the research ship into allowing her to escape. Suitengu signs the official marriage license with Shinsen, but tells Tsujido to keep Kagura away from Shinsen. Yurigaoka attacks Ginza while she is sleeping, but she reacts and stops him. His power, which makes his tattoos into physical objects, allows him to implant a spider tattoo on Ginza's neck, which works as a tracking device. He then escapes after immobilizing Ginza. Kagura finds her grandmother before Niihari captures Kagura, but Shinsen finds them. She then tears the marriage license apart following Kagura's revelation and pulls a power play, leaving Suitengu, his men, and Kagura at the mercy of her servants. However, Suitengu makes quick work of the servants with his Euphoric ability and kills Shinsen and Shinsen's mother.
13	"Ginza the Lawless"; Transliteration: "Ginza Bangaichi" (Japanese: 銀座番外地)	July 1, 2005	May 30, 2008
As Kagura clutches the lifeless body of Shinsen in her arms, Suitengu reveals his plan to marry Kagura to inherit the Tennōzu Group. Ginza visits Saiga in jail and reveals that she was attacked by Yurigaoka, but Saiga reveals his power by blasting through the cell. Ginza drives Saiga to retrieve the test results. Suitengu tells the other members of the Club of his planned marriage to Kagura is only a contract, and reassures them that she will remain the "goddess." Yurigaoka preys on another girl and kills her while looking for Saiga. The test results reveal a DNA-altering virus as the genetic basis of Saiga's powers, the virus only being activated when it comes into contact with Kagura's bodily fluids. When Saiga and Ginza turn to leave, they are attacked by Yurigaoka. He uses the spider tattoo implanted on Ginza's skin to control her, but Saiga still defeats him. He is hit by a bullet that Saiga dodges.
14	"The Wedding Photographer"; Transliteration: "Hitozuma Kagura" (Japanese: 人妻神楽)	July 8, 2005	June 6, 2008
Saiga sends Ginza to the hospital, but discovers an invitation to Suitengu's wedding. He travels to a hobby shop for an order. A priest, Father Kanda, is chided by another priest for spending the Church's donation money, but he reveals his Euphoric power of controlling electricity, which he sees as the real God. He then electrocutes the other priest, causing the dilapidated church to burn down a fire. Saiga checks in with his old contacts to begin to gather information on the wedding. After Ginza awakens, she plans to crash the wedding as well. Saiga interrupts the wedding by causing an explosion, revealing the wedding to the media, taunting Suitengu to reveal his powers in front of the cameras. The chaos that ensues allows Saiga and Suitengu to fight, but Saiga escapes with Kagura. The marriage, however, is still legalized, so Suitengu gains control over Tennōzu Group. Kanda attacks Saiga and Kagura on the rooftop of the church as they escape on Bob's helicopter, but he dies after getting hit by Saiga's camera powers. Kanda electrocutes himself to death as he tries to use his powers one last time to attack the helicopter.
15	"Hell is a Wet Woman"; Transliteration: "Nure Onna Jigoku" (Japanese: 濡れ女地獄)	July 22, 2005	June 13, 2008
Saiga and Kagura continue to avoid Suitengu's men, and Ginza drinks herself senseless. Missing person posters containing Saiga's photo are posted, so they travel to the countryside to avoid suspicion. Tsujido approaches Miharu Shirumaku to ask her to pursue Saiga and Kagura, and she is found to be a mute. Kagura recounts the tale of The Little Mermaid and collapses with a fever. Tsujido tells Makabe and Niihari about Shirumaku's past and also move to pursue Saiga. Saiga switches from the trains to a car to avoid detection, but they enter a bank of fog and Shirumaku makes advances on Saiga, going as far as to try to kiss him. When this fails, she entraps him in water and attempts to drown him, but Kagura saves Saiga and Shirumaku finally "joins her mother" as she is evaporated into the atmosphere.
16	"Audit the Wicked"; Transliteration: "Hanki Kessan Hōkoku" (Japanese: 半期決算報告)	August 12, 2005	June 20, 2008
Suitengu releases a drug that simulates Kagura's kiss to the public as an addictive. The money that this plan potentially could earn draws in more investors and the politicians all agree to this plan. Suitengu collects money, but surprisingly accepts fake money from a child's game. Then, the group begins an audit to check their balances, summarizing each event since Saiga's initial introduction to the club. Suitengu opens a musical box in his office, as the scene switches back to Saiga and Kagura. Saiga is whistling the same melody from Suitengu's music box, as he tells Kagura about his past and the melody he heard during a near-death experience as a war photographer. He wonders if that's when he contracted the Euphorian virus.
17	"The Reaper and the Nouveau Riche"; Transliteration: "Shinigami Narikin" (Japanese: 死神成金)	August 19, 2005	June 27, 2008
Suitengu listens to the melody of his music box and utters the name "Yui." He begins to reminisce about his childhood with his sister, Yui. On that fateful day, he discovers his parents hung and a man arrives to collect the debt they owe. Yui attempts to pay with money from a child's game, but the man discards the money and takes her captive and sends Suitengu off to army training. Suitengu always keeps his music box and survives the battles for seven years. On his last mission, he is sent to attack a research laboratory, but when the rest of his squad is defeated, he ends up becoming a test subject. He is healed and given a Euphoric power which allows him to defeat the army when they attack again. After arriving in Japan, he saves the lives of Tsujido, Makabe, and Niihari, and they become his followers. Then, he entices Shinsen into his plan for dominance and sets his plan into motion.
18	"Fates and Fists"; Transliteration: "Daisan Kyoku" (Japanese: 第三局)	August 26, 2005	July 4, 2008
The public begins to purchase Tennōzu Group's products in large masses, creating huge profits for the Group. Suitengu's enjoy themselves with their new-found wealth while the rest of the company methodically sorts and counts the money. By using the photo of Kagura taken by Saiga, Suitengu is able to market his products easily. They find the location of Kagura and Saiga, but Saiga has worked enough to pay for a trip away from Japan, but they are surprised by the arrival of Genba Ryougoku, who convinces them to return to Tokyo so Kagura can receive treatment. They are taken in to protective custody at an embassy, under the eye of Seiji Ochiai, a former photographer and politician. He leads a group working to overthrow Suitengu, so Saiga gladly joins him.
19	"Lips and Lies"; Transliteration: "Uso to Kuchibiru" (Japanese: 嘘とくちびる)	September 2, 2005	July 11, 2008
Saiga agrees to testify in a case that will lead to Suitengu's downfall under the condition that Kagura gets medical treatment. Ginza investigates another murder in a string of crimes, which Shiina, Ginza's subordinate, notes as odd. Ginza leaves, depressed at Saiga's continued absence. Kagura asks Saiga if she can testify alongside him, but he refuses to let her, and they both are forced to face their emotions. Saiga leaves Kagura in tears, joining a member of Ochiai's White Eagles, Kitazawa Jouji, for a drink. They exchange words until Jouji falls asleep. Saiga tricks Kagura into traveling to the airport, but her car is surrounded. Saiga meets the White Eagles. At the meeting, Jouji reveals Ochiai as the spy, but Ochiai uses his Euphoric power to kill the White Eagles and attacks Saiga.
20	"Good Vibrations"; Transliteration: "Guddo Baiburēshon" (Japanese: グッドバイブレーション)	September 9, 2005	July 18, 2008
Ochiai's attacks, vibrations in the air, are unavoidable, and Saiga almost dies. He escapes to the underground subway tunnels however, and continues to duel with Ochiai. Ginza and Saiga's boss discover the stage covered in the bodies of the White Eagles, and Ginza finds the book containing the names of all of the members of the Roppongi Club and departs. Professor Nishiya, a friend of Ryougoku's, reveals his role in the capture of Kagura. When nothing goes as he expected, he kidnaps Kagura and attempts to rape her to activate the virus within him, but is stopped. Kagura collapses in Ryougoku's arms, and they agree to cooperate. Saiga struggles to defeat Ochiai, and finally does when a train arrives to light his camera. Ginza is captured by Chief Ekoda, the Chief of the Police Department when she goes to confront him about his membership.
21	"All Hail the Glutton"; Transliteration: "Sōri no Chōshoku" (Japanese: 総理の朝食)	September 16, 2005	July 25, 2008
Saiga begins to go blind as a side-effect of his Euphoric powers. He awakens from a dream of Kagura and struggles out of the subway tunnels. Kagura, still entrapped, exchanges words with Doctor Ryougoku from across a wall. Ginza awakens and discovers Chief Ekoda's leg fetish. When he covers Ginza's legs in the drugs from the Tennōzu Group, she accidentally kills him in a fit of insanity. She infiltrates the Club to investigate after cleaning her legs of Tennōzu Group's drugs. Ryougoku discovers a way to save Kagura, but before he can tell her, Kagura is brought before Prime Minister Kamiya. He reveals his fetish for food and his plan to attack Suitengu, and transforms into his Euphoric form while eating. Saiga prepares to attack Suitengu as well, but Suitengu defeats the soldiers sent to kill him and moves on the offensive.
22	"Money, Money, Money"; Transliteration: "Okane Kudasai" (Japanese: オカネクダサイ)	September 23, 2005	August 1, 2008
Suitengu continues his attack on the Prime Minister's mansion, managing to blow a hole through the bulletproof glass. He lands on the roof of the building and kills the guards, all of which is being broadcast to the Club. He calls the men at the club and informs them that they have been trapped, but Ginza escapes before the exits are blocked off. Suitengu gives his men the choice of leaving with money or remaining behind. Kamiya's power, however, destroys Saiga's camera, disabling him, but Suitengu arrives. He reveals more about his history and Kamiya's role as the man who sold him and his sister into captivity, and kills Kamiya in revenge. Kagura joins Suitengu in exchange for Saiga's life, and Tsujido and Makabe, who remain at Suitengu's side, retrieve them from the mansion.
23	"Tender Grave"; Transliteration: "Satsutaba no Bohyō" (Japanese: 札束の墓標)	September 30, 2005	August 8, 2008
Saiga and Ryougoku emerge from the burning mansion to meet Ginza. High-ranking politicians and diplomats from around the world observe Suitengu's actions and decide to eliminate him. Saiga is patched up and Ginza reveals what she has discovered. When the world prepares to attack Tokyo to kill Suitengu, the population of Tokyo begins evacuating and riots break out during the escape. Saiga continues to lose his sight, but resolves to save Kagura before he goes completely blind. Before he leaves, Ginza joins him. Upon entering, they are attacked by Tsujido and Makabe, but Ginza provides Saiga cover, which allows him to travel to Suitengu. Missiles hit the building, but Saiga still reaches Suitengu's location.
24	"The Roppongi Crisis"; Transliteration: "Roppongi Kuraishisu" (Japanese: 六本木クライシス)	September 30, 2005	August 15, 2008
Attacks continue on the Tennōzu Group building, but they fail to interrupt either Ginza's battle with Tsujido and Makabe or Saiga's duel with Suitengu. Saiga and Suitengu both attack each other with words before finally using their powers. A missile strike causes a column to fall on Tsujido and Makabe, and Makabe dies to save Tsujido. Tsujido transforms into his Euphoric form and temporarily disables Ginza before she finally defeats him. Saiga and Ginza meet, and Saiga tells Ginza to take Kagura and run while he fights Suitengu, so she forcefully drags Kagura away. Saiga is unable to kill Suitengu before he finally goes blind, but Suitengu spares Saiga and leaves him on a separate building before causing the Tennōzu Group's building to erupt into flame, killing the members of the Club and destroying all of the money he gathered, plunging the world into a financial crisis. Five years later, Kagura, cured by Ryougoku's medical treatment, finally reunites with Saiga.
