= Clarine Harp =

American voice actress

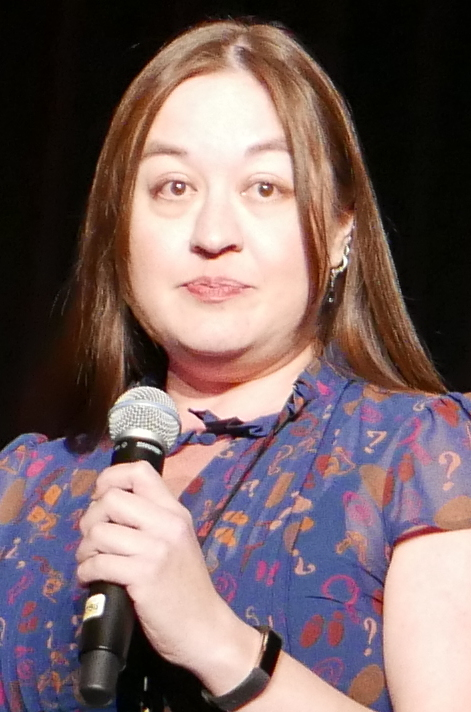
- Harp at Nan Desu Kan 2017
- Born: Clarine Miranda Harp; January 5, 1978 (age 48); Fort Worth, Texas, U.S.
- Occupation: Voice actress

Clarine Miranda Harp (born January 5, 1978) is an American voice actress and director who is known for her works at the Blu-ray, DVD, and video production departments at Funimation.

Her performance as Hibari Ginza in the 2006-2007 release of Speed Grapher won her an ADR Award as "Actress of the Month" for October 2006 as voted by members of the websites Dub Review and Anime on DVD.

Harp is also the inspiration for Aubrey Chorde, one of the main characters in the webcomic Something Positive by her friend R.K. Milholland. He claims he decided to make the comic after she told him to do "something positive" with his life. She lives and works in the Dallas–Fort Worth metroplex area of Texas. Her hobbies include knitting, crafts and collecting oddities, including creatively styled taxidermy.

== Filmography ==
=== Anime voice roles ===
- Aquarion - Esperanza (Ep. 15)
- BECK: Mongolian Chop Squad - Kayo
- Burst Angel - Sei
- Case Closed (FUNimation dub) - Michelle Hamlin, Famke Hotta, Nancy Schmidt, Heidi Xanderbilt
- Casshern Sins - Helene
- Cat Planet Cuties - Sara
- Chaos;Head - Sena Aoi
- Chrome Shelled Regios - Dalseina Che Matelna
- Claymore - Undine
- Corpse Princess - Mizuki Inuhiko
- Dance in the Vampire Bund - Nicole Edelman (Ep. 4)
- Danganronpa 3: The End of Hope's Peak High School - Peko Pekoyama
- D.Gray-man - Mahoja
- El Cazador de la Bruja - Jody "Blue Eyes" Hayward
- Fullmetal Alchemist series - Mrs. Armstrong
- Fruits Basket - Kagura's Mother
- Gangsta - Gina Paulklee
- Ghost Hunt - Teruka Yoshimi
- Hetalia: Axis Powers series - China, Taiwan (The Beautiful World), Female China (Nyotalia)
- Heaven's Lost Property series - Harpy
- Jormungand series - Chiquita
- Jyu Oh Sei - Chen
- Kaze no Stigma - Izumi Kurahashi
- Kiddy Grade - Tweedledee
- Last Exile: Fam, the Silver Wing - Tatiana Wisla
- Michiko & Hatchin - Elis (Ep. 12, 16)
- Negima! series - Kaede Nagase
- One Piece (FUNimation dub) - Banchina (Usopp's Mother), Ms. Monday, Ran
- Origin: Spirits of the Past - Cain's Mom
- Ouran High School Host Club - Tamaki Girl 1 (Ep. 21)
- Panty & Stocking with Garterbelt - Kitagawa (Ep. 5B)
- Riddle Story of Devil - Koko Kaminaga
- Rin ~Daughters of Mnemosyne - Laura
- The Sacred Blacksmith - Evande
- Samurai 7 - Sanae
- Sekirei series - Haihane
- Shakugan no Shana - Tiamat (Seasons 2–3, OVA)
- Shangri-La - Ayako
- Shin-chan (FUNimation dub) - Ms. Katz
- Speed Grapher - Hibari Ginza
- Spice and Wolf II - Adele Cole
- Spiral - Takako Adachi
- Strike Witches 2 - Nishiki Nakajima (Ep. 12)
- The Tower of Druaga - Gremica
- Trinity Blood - Colonel Mary Spencer
- Unbreakable Machine-Doll - Shouko Karyuusai
- Witchblade - Asagi
- Yurikuma Arashi - Him (Ep. 8)
- Yu Yu Hakusho - Kokou, Ryuuhi
