= Christopher Sabat =

American voice actor

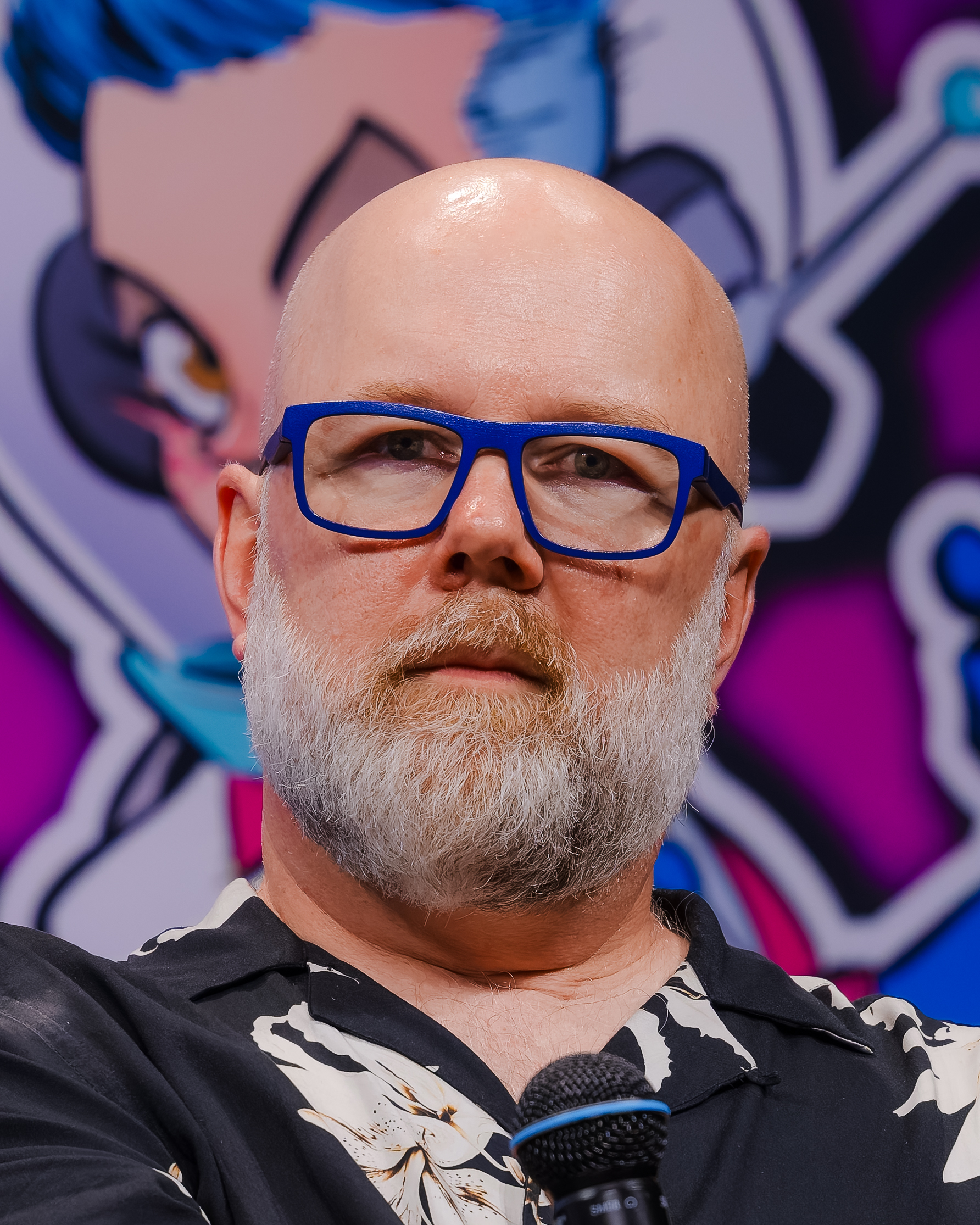
- Sabat in 2026
- Born: Christopher Robin Sabat
- Education: University of North Texas
- Occupations: Voice actor, director
- Years active: 1997–present
- Agent: Mary Collins
- Children: 2

Christopher Robin Sabat is an American voice actor, voice director, and ADR director. Some of his prominent roles in animations and anime include Vegeta, Piccolo, Yamcha, Shenron, and various other characters in Dragon Ball, Roronoa Zoro in One Piece, Giroro in Sgt. Frog, All Might in My Hero Academia, Daisuke Jigen in Lupin the Third, and Yami Sukehiro in Black Clover.

== Career ==
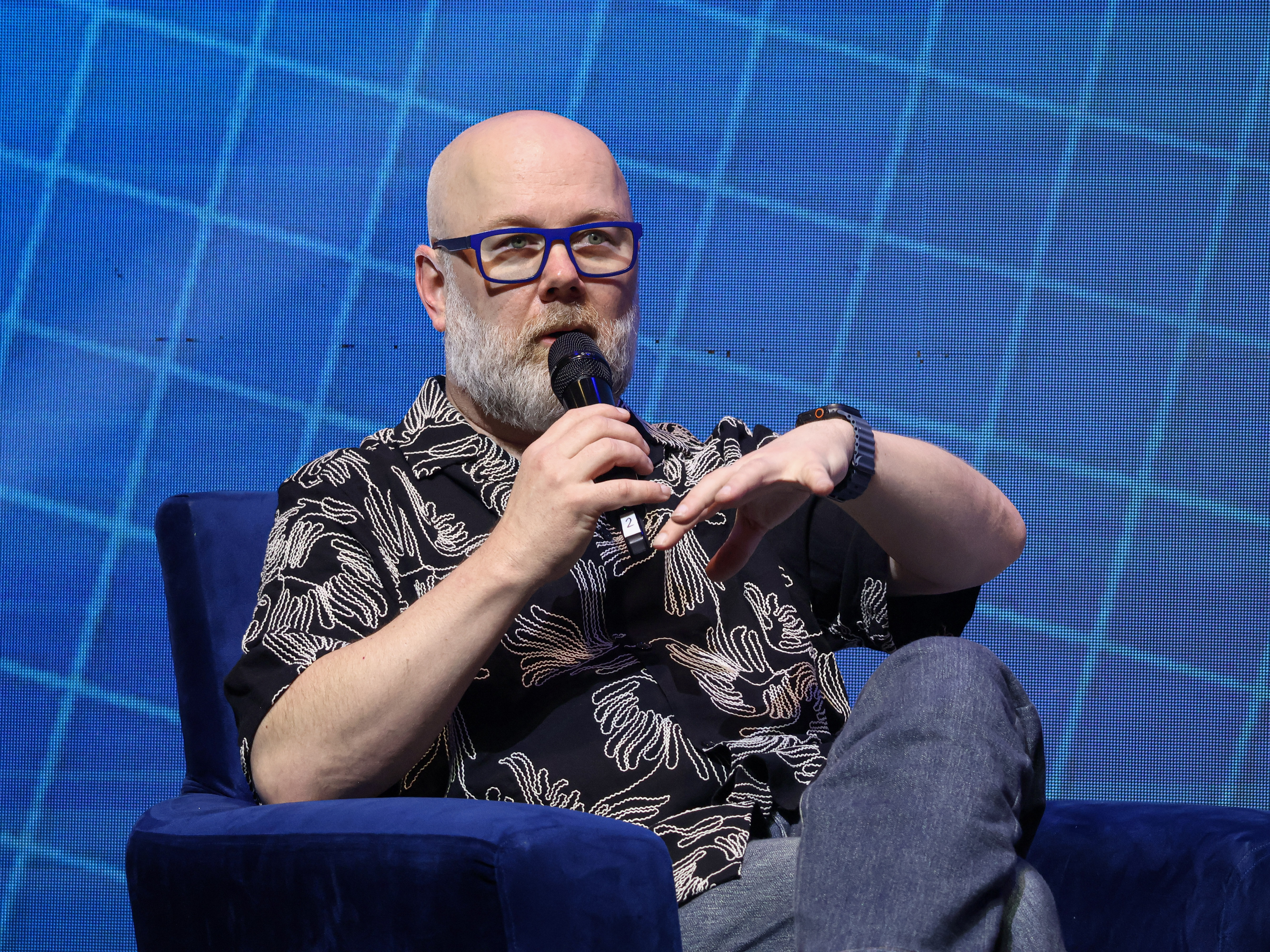
Sabat at Comic Con Cape Town in 2026

Sabat has provided voices for English-versions of Japanese anime and video games, including a variety of Dragon Ball characters, such as Vegeta, Piccolo, Yamcha, Shenron and others.

Besides voicing in Dragon Ball he has lent his voice to several other anime characters including Giroro in Sgt. Frog, Daisuke Jigen in Lupin the Third, Kazuma Kuwabara in YuYu Hakusho, Alex Louis Armstrong in Fullmetal Alchemist, Tatsumi Saiga in Speed Grapher, Kurogane in Tsubasa: Reservoir Chronicle, All Might in My Hero Academia, Roronoa Zoro in the Funimation dub of One Piece, Yami Sukehiro in Black Clover, Elfman Strauss in Fairy Tail, Arthur Watts in RWBY, Grip in Assassination Classroom, Ayame Soma in Fruits Basket, Shio SAKAKI in History's Strongest Disciple Kenichi

In video games, he voices Alex D in Deus Ex: Invisible War, Rundas in Metroid Prime 3: Corruption, Garland in Dissidia: Final Fantasy, Banyue in Zenless Zone Zero, Askal in Freedom Planet 2, and Captain Smiley and Star in Comic Jumper. He is also the founder and director of OkraTron 5000, an audio production company that provides support for some of Funimation's dubbing titles.

== Filmography ==
=== Anime ===
List of voice performances in anime
Year	Title	Role	Crew role, Notes	Source
1999–2003, 2005	Dragon Ball Z	Vegeta, Piccolo, Yamcha, Vegito, Guru, Shenron, Mr. Popo, Turtle, Nappa, Korin, others	Voice director Vegito shared w/ Sean Schemmel	
2000	Dragon Ball Z: The History of Trunks	Turtle, Vegeta, Piccolo, Yamcha	TV special	
2000	Dragon Ball Z: Bardock - The Father of Goku	Zarbon, Vegeta, Borgos, Grandpa Gohan, Nappa	TV special Nappa redubbed by Phil Parsons in remaster	
2001	Dragon Ball	Yamcha, Turtle, King Piccolo, Piccolo Jr., Mr. Popo, Shenron, Grandpa Gohan, Korin, others		
2001	Blue Gender		ADR Director	CA
2001–06	Lupin the Third specials	Daisuke Jigen	ADR Director	
2002	YuYu Hakusho	Kazuma Kuwabara, Raizen, Gama	Assistant ADR Director	Press
2002	Fruits Basket	Ayame Soma	Also 2019 reboot	
2003–2005	Dragon Ball GT	Vegeta, Piccolo, Gogeta (SSJ4), others	Gogeta shared w/ Sean Schemmel	
2004	Fullmetal Alchemist	Alex Louis Armstrong, Philip Gargantos Armstrong	Also Fullmetal Alchemist: Brotherhood	Press
2004	Case Closed	Vodka, Craig Newberry, Otto, others	As Dark-Haired Man in Black; ADR Director; FUNimation dub	CA
2004	Kiddy Grade	Chevalier D'Autriche		CA
2004	Spiral	Kiyotaka Narumi		CA
2004	Dragon Ball GT: A Hero's Legacy	Torga, Yamcha		
2005	Burst Angel	Azuma Iriki		CA
2005	Gunslinger Girl	Pietro Fermi	ADR Director	CA
2005	Samurai 7	Kikuchiyo		CA
2005	Sakura Taisen: Ecole de Paris	Bartender	OVA series	CA
2006	Trinity Blood	Tres Iqus		CA
2006	Shin-Chan	Mr. K, Narrator	Funimation dub	CA
2006	Speed Grapher	Saiga Tatsumi		Press
2007	Tsubasa: Reservoir Chronicle	Kurogane		Press
2007	SoltyRei	Roy Revant	Line producer ADR Director	CA
2007–present	One Piece	Roronoa Zoro (eps. 590), others	Funimation dub	Press
2007	BECK: Mongolian Chop Squad	Preview Narrator		CA
2007	Glass Fleet	Heizak	ADR Director	CA
2007	Heroic Age	Karkinos Rucan		CA
2007	Mushishi	Koro's Father	Ep. 7	CA
2008	Darker than Black	Yusuke Saito		Resume
2009	Kenichi: The Mightiest Disciple	Shio Sakaki		
2009	Sgt. Frog	Giroro		Resume
2009	Spice and Wolf	Marlheit		CA
2010	Initial D	Kyoichi Sudo	Second Stage; credited as Christopher R. Sabat	
2010–17	Dragon Ball Z Kai	Vegeta, Piccolo, Yamcha, Vegito, others	Also The Final Chapters; Vegito shared w/ Sean Schemmel; ADR Director	
2010	My Bride Is a Mermaid	Masa		Resume
2010	Hetalia Axis Powers	Rome		Resume
2010	Ouran High School Host Club	Ritsu Kasanoda		CA
2011–19	Fairy Tail	Elfman Strauss, Snarl (ep. 4)		Resume
2012	Sengoku Basara: Samurai Kings 2	Toyotomi Hideyoshi		
2012	Steins;Gate	Yugo "Mr. Braun" Tennouji	Also Steins;Gate 0	
2012	Panty & Stocking with Garterbelt	Garterbelt		Resume
2012–18	High School DxD	Ddraig		Resume
2013	Toriko	Umen Umeda		CA
2013–23	The Devil Is a Part-Timer!	Albert Ende		
2013	Aesthetica of a Rogue Hero	Kaito Kubota	Eps. 6, 9, 11	
2014	Psycho-Pass	Sakuya Togane		
2014	Attack on Titan	Kitz Woermann		Resume
2014	Space Dandy	Isaac	Ep. 17	Resume
2014	Yona of the Dawn	Son Hak		
2015	Nobunagun	Annus / Robert Capa		
2015	Danganronpa: The Animation	Mondo Owada		
2015–18	Free!	Goro Sasabe		
2015	Tokyo Ghoul	Yakumo Omori		
2016	Yuri on Ice	Christophe Giacometti		
2016	Brothers Conflict	Ukyo Asahina		
2016	Snow White with the Red Hair	Marquis Haruka		
2016	Dimension W	Kyoma Mabuchi		
2016	Black Butler: Book of Circus	Jumbo		
2016	Wise Man's Grandchild	Michel Collins		
2016	Rage of Bahamut: Genesis	Martinet		
2016	Divine Gate	Palomides		
2016	Shimoneta: A Boring World Where the Concept of Dirty Jokes Doesn't Exist	Narrator, Base Black		
2016–25	My Hero Academia	Toshinori "All Might" Yagi		
2016	One-Punch Man	Vaccine Man	Episode: "The Strongest Man"	
2016	All Out!!	Coach		
2017–19	Dragon Ball Super	Vegeta, Piccolo, Yamcha, Vegito, others	ADR Director; Vegito shared w/ Sean Schemmel	
2018–21	Black Clover	Yami Sukehiro		
2018	That Time I Got Reincarnated as a Slime	King Abiru	Ep 10.	
2018	Pop Team Epic	Popuko; Shunsuke Itakura (Team AC)	Ep. 1A; Bob Epic Team segments (Popuko); Ep. 7 (Shunsuke Itakura (Team AC))	
2018	Cardcaptor Sakura: Clear Card	Cerberus (True Form)	Ep. 6	
2018	Legend of the Galactic Heroes	Walter von Schönkopf		
2019	Magical Girl Spec-Ops Asuka	Yoshiaki Izuka		
2019	After School Dice Club	George Beresford		
2019	Fire Force	Danrou Oze, Mamoru		
2021	Suppose a Kid from the Last Dungeon Boonies Moved to a Starter Town	Vritra		
2022	The Prince of Tennis	Hoo Byodoin		
2022	The Yakuza's Guide to Babysitting	Kazuhiko Sakuragi		
2023	Vinland Saga	Snake	Crunchyroll dub	
2023	Mobile Suit Gundam: The Witch from Mercury	Vim		
2023	Reborn as a Vending Machine, I Now Wander the Dungeon	Director Bear		
2023	Pluto	Marshall, Armstrong		
2023	I'm in Love With the Villainess	L'Ausseil		
2023	Spy × Family	Mr. Green		
2024	Solo Leveling	Baek Yoon-ho		
2024	Monsters: 103 Mercies Dragon Damnation	Zoro, Narrator		
2024	Frieren: Beyond Journey's End	Dunste		
2024	Spice and Wolf: Merchant Meets the Wise Wolf	Marlheit		
2024	Fairy Tail: 100 Years Quest	Elfman Strauss		
2024	I'll Become a Villainess Who Goes Down in History	Luke Seeker		
2025	Dragon Ball Daima	Vegeta, Yamcha, Shenron	4 episodes	
2025	My Hero Academia: Vigilantes	Toshinori "All Might" Yagi	2 episodes	
2025	Go! Go! Loser Ranger!	Daisuke Daidai	Ep 1.	

=== Films ===
List of voice performances in feature films
Year	Title	Role	Crew role, Notes	Source
2012	Dragon Age: Dawn of the Seeker	Knight Commander		
2014	Dragon Ball Z: Battle of Gods	Vegeta, Piccolo, Yamcha, Shenron, Bubbles	Voice director	
2015	Dragon Ball Z: Resurrection 'F'	Vegeta, Piccolo, Shenron	Voice director	
2017	One Piece Film: Gold	Roronoa Zoro		
2018	My Hero Academia: Two Heroes	Toshinori "All Might" Yagi		
2019	Dragon Ball Super: Broly	Vegeta, Piccolo, King Vegeta, Zarbon, Shenron, Gogeta	Voice director	
2019	Code Geass: Lelouch of the Re;surrection	Bitool		
2019	One Piece: Stampede	Roronoa Zoro		
2020	My Hero Academia: Heroes Rising	Toshinori "All Might" Yagi		
2020	Jiang Ziya	Jiang Ziya	English dub	
2021	My Hero Academia: World Heroes' Mission	Toshinori "All Might" Yagi		
2022	Dragon Ball Super: Super Hero	Vegeta, Piccolo, Korin, Shenron		
2022	One Piece Film: Red	Roronoa Zoro		
2024	My Hero Academia: You're Next	Toshinori "All Might" Yagi, Dark Might		

List of voice performances in direct-to-video and television films
Year	Title	Role	Crew role, Notes	Source
1998–present	Dragon Ball series	Vegeta, Piccolo, Yamcha, Gogeta, others	Voice director	Resume
1999	Chuck E. Cheese in the Galaxy 5000	Mr. Munch, Announcer, Narrator	Assistant voice director, Music editor; Credited as Chris Sabat	
2002–06	Lupin III films	Daisuke Jigen	Funimation dub	Press
2004	Blue Gender: The Warrior	Keith Bean		CA
2006	Fullmetal Alchemist the Movie: Conqueror of Shamballa	Alex Louis Armstrong		CA
2007	Origin: Spirits of the Past	Hajan		CA
2008	One Piece Movie: The Desert Princess and the Pirates: Adventures in Alabasta	Roronoa Zoro		
2009	Tsubasa Reservoir Chronicle the Movie: The Princess in the Birdcage Kingdom	Kurogane		Resume
2010	Summer Wars	Katsuhiko Jinnouchi		Resume
2012	Fullmetal Alchemist: The Sacred Star of Milos	Alex Louis Armstrong		CA
2012	Sengoku Basara: The Last Party	Toyotomi Hideyoshi		CA
2012	Tales of Vesperia: The First Strike	Niren Fedrok		
2014	One Piece Film: Z	Roronoa Zoro		
2023	Fist of the North Star: Legends of the True Savior	Souther	Film: "Legend of Raoh: Chapter of Death on Love"	
2023	Black Clover: Sword of the Wizard King	Yami Sukehiro		
2023	Mazinkaiser vs the Great General of Darkness	Scarabeth, EU Army Captain		
2023	Justice League x RWBY: Super Heroes and Huntsmen, Part Two	Dr. Arthur Watts		
2024	My Hero Academia: You're Next	Toshinori "All Might" Yagi, Dark Might		

=== Animation ===
List of voice performances in animation
Year	Title	Role	Crew role, Notes	Source
2015	Death Battle	Solid Snake, Smokey Bear		
2016	Red vs. Blue	Siris		
2016–2021	RWBY	Dr. Arthur Watts		
2020	Cards	Vincent		
2020	The Stockholms	Santa Claus	4 episodes	
2020	Cyanide & Happiness	Santa Claus	1 episode	
2023	The Legend of Vox Machina	Farmer	TBA	
2023	Lego Monkie Kid	Azure Lion		
2024	Big City Greens	Starmadillo	Episode: "Starter Pack"	
2025	To Be Hero X	Ahu		
2026–present	Gameoverse	Warrick		

=== Video games ===
List of voice performances in video games
Year	Title	Role	Crew role, Notes	Source
2002–present	Dragon Ball series	Vegeta, Piccolo, Yamcha, Vegito, Various Characters		
2003	Deus Ex: Invisible War	Alex Denton (Male)		Press
2004	BloodRayne 2	Slezz, Newscaster, Minions		
2005	Æon Flux	Dietz, Soldiers		
2005	Spikeout: Battle Street	Tenshin, Void		
2007	Metroid Prime 3: Corruption	Rundas		Press
2008	The Last Remnant	Conqueror		
2009	Dissidia: Final Fantasy	Garland		
2009	Ghostbusters: The Video Game	Additional Voices		
2009	Borderlands	Sledge		
2009	Case Closed: The Mirapolis Investigation	Jack Chase		
2010	Comic Jumper: The Adventures of Captain Smiley	Captain Smiley, Star		Press
2011	Duke Nukem Forever	Talk Show Host		
2011	Orcs Must Die!	Paladin		
2011	Duke Nukem: Critical Mass	Dr. Proton		
2011	Dissidia 012 Final Fantasy	Garland		
2012	Borderlands 2	InnuendoBot 5000		
2013	The Walking Dead: Survival Instinct	Ahmad Farran, Emergency Broadcast System		
2014	Infamous Second Son	Concrete Bishop		
2014	Smite	Anhur, Fenrir, Geb, He Bo, Zeus	ADR Director	
2014	Borderlands: The Pre-Sequel!	Doctor Torres, Shifty Sheldon, Tog		
2016	Battleborn	Attikus, Geoff, Rath, S1 Chronicle, S1 Huntsman, S1 Wolf		
2018	Dissidia Final Fantasy NT	Garland		
2018	Realm Royale	Warrior (No Skin)		
2018	World of Final Fantasy Maxima	Garland	Archive audio	
2020	One-Punch Man: A Hero Nobody Knows	Vaccine Man		
2020	Fire Emblem Heroes	Duessel		
2021	Lost Judgment	Irie		
2021	Tales of Luminaria	Bastien Forge		
2022	Stranger of Paradise: Final Fantasy Origin	Garland		
2022	Tiny Tina's Wonderlands	Player Voice		
2022	Freedom Planet 2	Sgt. Askal	Audio/Voice recording	
2023	Them's Fightin' Herds	Stronghoof Hoofstrong	DLC	
2023	My Hero Ultra Rumble	Toshinori "All Might" Yagi		
2024	Solo Leveling: Arise	Baek Yoonho		
2025	Zenless Zone Zero	Banyue		
2025	Deadpool VR	Deadpool Kid		

=== Live-action ===
List of acting performances in film and television
Year	Title	Role	Crew role, Notes	Source
1999	Chuck E. Cheese in the Galaxy 5000	Piano Player	Assistant voice director, Music editor; Credited as Chris Sabat	
2015	Lumberjack Man	Shep		
