= Monica Rial =

American voice actress (born 1975)

- Rial at GalaxyCon Des Moines in 2026
- Born: Monica Jean Rial; October 5, 1975 (age 50); Houston, Texas, U.S.
- Education: University of Houston
- Occupations: Voice actress, ADR script writer
- Years active: 1999–present
- Agent: Mary Collins Agency
- Relatives: Natalie Rial (sister)
- Website: themonicarial.com

Monica Jean Rial (born October 5, 1975) is an American voice actress and ADR script writer affiliated with Funimation/Crunchyroll, ADV Films/Sentai Filmworks and Toei Animation USA. She provides voices for English-language versions of Japanese anime films and television series.

== Early life ==
Monica Rial was born on October 5, 1975, in Houston, Texas. Her father is from Pontevedra, Galicia, Spain. When she was young, her family would often visit Spain. She would translate for her younger brother some of the European Spanish-dubbed cartoons, which included anime shows Doraemon and Dragon Ball Z, often imitating the various characters. Rial studied ballet, tap, and jazz, but transitioned to musical theater when she was 12. She studied acting through high school as well as college at the University of Houston. In an interview with Otaku News, Rial mentioned voice actor inspirations from The Simpsons, Family Guy and Beavis and Butt-head.

== Career ==
Rial's first voice-over role was some walla in the 1999 dub of Martian Successor Nadesico. In an interview with Otaku News, Rial said she had to talk for two minutes straight as folks in a crowd telling the Jovians to go home. She would later land main character roles as Miharu in Gasaraki, Natsume in Generator Gawl, and Hello Kitty in Hello Kitty's Animation Theater, the last of which was one of ADV's best-selling DVDs. In 2001, she voiced Izumi in the baseball anime Princess Nine and in 2002, she got to voice Hyatt in Excel Saga, which she listed among her absolute favorites.

In 2003, Rial voiced best friend character Kyoko Tokiwa in Full Metal Panic!, and got to reprise her for Full Metal Panic? Fumoffu and Full Metal Panic: The Second Raid. In the same year, Rial voiced Kirika Yumura, the quiet assassin partner in Noir. Rial said that Kirika was challenging because she had very few words but had to convey a lot of emotions. She also noted that Kirika's personality changed over the course of the series, so she voiced her to be more emotional in later episodes which drew some criticism from fans. She also voiced Lila in Najica Blitz Tactics where she also got to do a DVD commentary along with fellow actress Kira Vincent-Davis. The commentaries have become popular as she receives feedback from fans about them at anime conventions.

In 2004, Rial started voice-over work with the anime dubbing company Funimation (currently known as Crunchyroll LLC) in the Dallas/Ft. Worth area. During that year, she voiced Amy in the long-running detective anime series Case Closed, and Lyra (and Dante) in the fantasy drama series Fullmetal Alchemist. Both of these shows were featured on Cartoon Network. She also voiced co-lead character Lumiere in Kiddy Grade. Meanwhile, with ADV, she voiced Nyamo-sensei in the school comedy Azumanga Daioh. She had also taken over some character roles as Momiji in Blue Seed and Maya in Neon Genesis Evangelion. Rial said that it was very difficult to try to sound like the previous voice actors, especially Maya's low voice, so she tried her own approach. She also got to voice Pen-Pen the penguin in Evangelion. In 2005, she voiced the serious lead character Jo in a team of mercenary girls in the cyberpunk science fiction series Burst Angel.

Rial continued to land leading roles in anime shows. In 2006, she voiced the title character in Nanaka 6/17, about a 17-year-old girl who, through an accident, has amnesia and regresses to her 6-year-old self. In Speed Grapher she voiced female protagonist Kagura Tennōzu, and in the ADV Films remake of Macross, she voiced Misa Hayase. In 2007, she voiced Sakura in the English anime adaptation of Clamp's Tsubasa: Reservoir Chronicle; Maria in Witchblade. She went on to replace Tiffany Vollmer as the voice of Bulma Briefs in the Dragon Ball franchise in 2009 beginning with Dragon Ball Z Kai and other media from that point on.

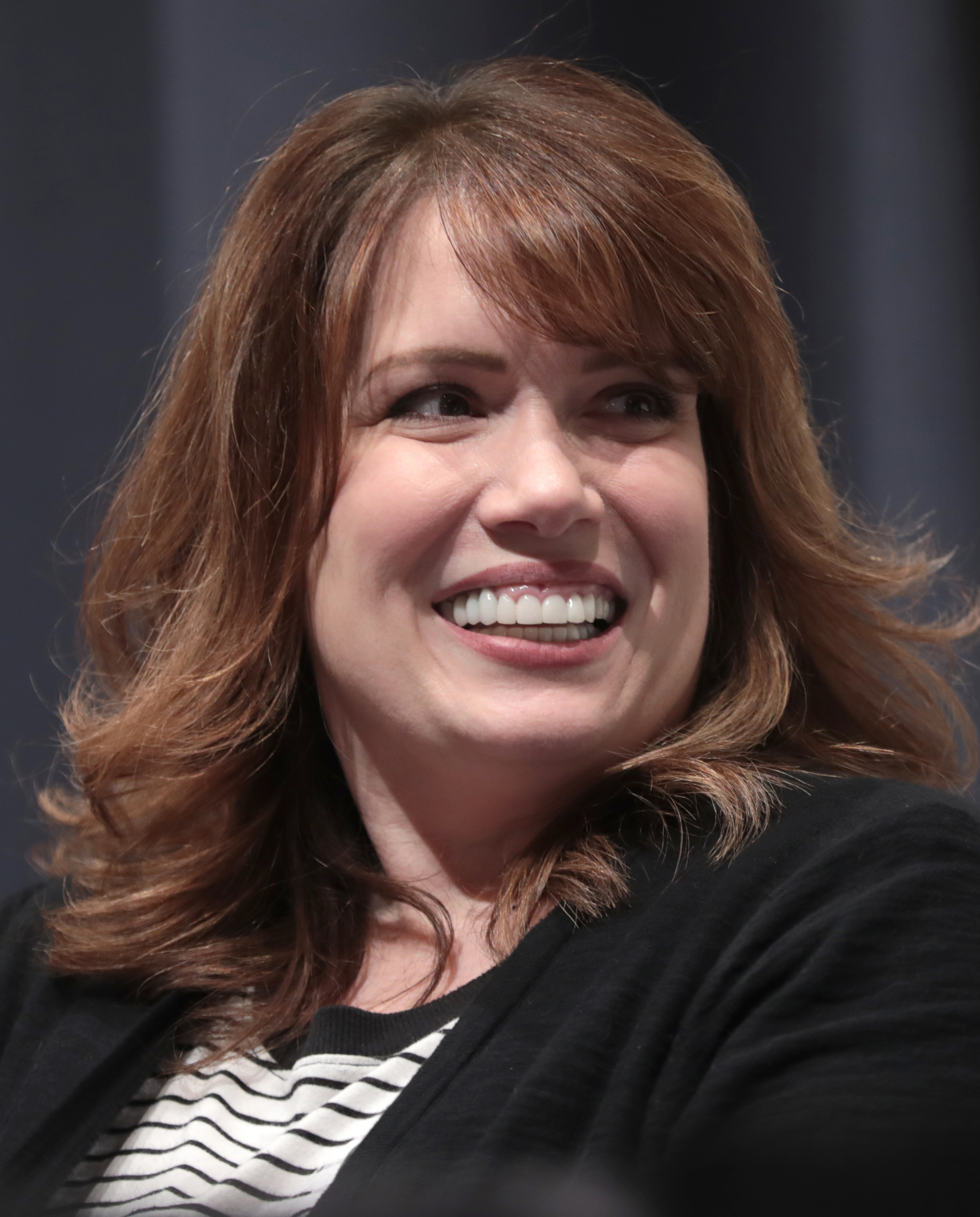
Rial at an event in 2023

Rial voiced more leads in 2012, with Shiro in Deadman Wonderland which also broadcast on Adult Swim, and Stocking in the first season of the raunchy comedy Panty & Stocking with Garterbelt. In 2013, she voiced the heroine character Haruko Amaya in the harem comedy Maken-ki! and Iori Nagase in the school anime series Kokoro Connect. With regard to her lead role of Michiko Malandro in Michiko & Hatchin, which was released on DVD in 2013 and was broadcast on Adult Swim in 2015, Rial said that out of the 300 or so characters she had voiced, only two of them were Hispanic, and she liked that her character wasn't a stereotype.

In addition to voice acting, Rial has been steadily involved in ADR script writing, with work in the English dubs for D.N. Angel, Madlax, and Gatchaman. In an interview with Active Anime, Rial said she would "take the direct translation and write it into a coherent scene that matches the lip flaps". At later anime conventions, Rial has mentioned that ADR script writing has kept her quite occupied, especially with SimulDubs, which are shows that are locally dubbed soon after the original broadcast. She has also written columns for Newtype's USA edition. In January 2018, Rial has announced that she is taking time off of script adaptation.

== Personal life ==
Rial has a younger brother, Miguel, and a younger sister, Natalie, who is also an actress. Both siblings have voiced in anime dubs.

As of April 2019, Rial was engaged to Dallas-based realtor Ron Toye. For a brief period in the 1990s, Rial was in a relationship with Illich Guardiola.

== Legal issues ==
In 2019, Rial alleged that she had been sexually assaulted by fellow voice actor Vic Mignogna in 2007. On April 19, 2019, Mignogna filed a lawsuit against Rial, her fiancé, Ron Toye, as well as Funimation and Jamie Marchi for tortious interference, civil conspiracy, and defamation in regards to Rial's allegations. On July 19, 2019, Rial, Toye and Marchi all filed anti-SLAPP motions for Mignogna to dismiss his lawsuit. On October 4, 2019, the case was dismissed, and all the charges against Funimation, Marchi, Rial and Toye were dropped. In February 2022, Rial and Marchi began a podcast about the case.
