= The Stockholms =

American adult animated web series

- Genre: Adult animation Crime comedy Sitcom
- Created by: Mike Salcedo
- Written by: Mike Salcedo
- Directed by: Mike Salcedo
- Voices of: Geoff Galenda; Jessica Calvello; Autumn Soeder; Elizabeth Del Rosario
- Theme music composer: Steve Lehmann
- Opening theme: “The Stockholms” by Steve Lehmann
- Ending theme: “The Stockholms are gonna be okay” by Steve Lehmann
- Composer: Steve Lehmann
- Country of origin: United States
- Original language: English
- No. of episodes: 10

Production
- Executive producers: Rob DenBleyker; Dave McElfatrick; Kris Wilson; Micah Brooke; Carlo Moss
- Producer: Adam Nushrallah
- Editor: Henrik Källberg
- Running time: 3–5 Minutes
- Production companies: Explosm Entertainment; Octopie

Original release
- Network: YouTube
- Release: July 30 – September 24, 2020

The Stockholms is an American adult animated comedy web series created by Mike Salcedo, and produced by Explosm Entertainment and Octopie.

In 2025 the series was added on Tubi.

== Premise ==
It is a hostage situation comedy, that focuses on a bank robber named Jasper Williams, who forms a captive dysfunctional family. The main characters are Jasper Williams, Charlene, Marley, and Yong Sun. They are captive, but primarily unrelated, due to having different skin color, and being from other families.

== Characters ==
- Jasper Williams (voiced by Geoff Galneda) - A bank robber who owns the captive dysfunctional family.
- Charlene (voiced by Jessica Calvello) - The unrelated wife of Jasper.
- Marley (voiced by Autumn Soeder) - The unrelated sister of the captive dysfunctional family.
- Yong Sun (voiced by Elizabeth Del Rosario) - The unrelated youngest of the family.
- Ned/Spot (voiced by Mike Salcedo) - The primary spineless police negotiator. He pretends to be a dog named Spot in Episodes 8 and 9, and his complete incompetence and submissive personality are the reasons why the hostage situation breaks records over five months.
- Willy (voiced by Zach Hadel) - Jasper’s long forgotten friend and original getaway driver, who appears in episodes 9 and 10, he plans to kill Jasper and his family.
- Santa Claus (voiced by Christopher Sabat) - A character based on Santa Claus. He appears in Episode 3, and dies in Episode 7.
- The Pizza Delivery Guy (voiced by Connor Murphy) - A guy who delivers the pizza. He appears in Episode 1, and last in Episode 10.
- Chris Pine (voiced by Nolan North) - Chris Pine appears in Episode 2, and his final appearance is in Episode 7. He is a fictionalized version of the actor of the same name. He slow dances with Marley, and has a prom date with her.

== Episodes ==
No.	Title	Original release date
1	"The Dinnertime Crime"	July 30, 2020
2	"The Prom Job"	July 30, 2020
3	"The Holiday Heist"	August 6, 2020
4	"Emotions Eleven"	August 13, 2020
5	"Bankrupt!"	August 20, 2020
6	"The Sting-Along Sing"	August 27, 2020
7	"Christmas Mourning"	September 3, 2020
8	"The Canine Caper"	September 10, 2020
9	"A Man, A Van, A Getaway Plan"	September 17, 2020
10	"The Last Mambo"	September 24, 2020
