= Yorico =

Japanese singer-songwriter

Yorico (より子, Yoriko; previously known as より子。), real name Yoriko Takano (高野頼子, Takano Yoriko), born May 13, 1984, is a female Japanese singer-songwriter from Utsunomiya. She is mostly known for her songs used in Japanese television shows, including several that had made the Oricon charts, and for her song "Break the Cocoon", which was used as ending theme in the anime series Speed Grapher.

She has been working for the record company EMI Music Japan, record labels Virgin Music, Pure Music and Watanabe Entertainment before turning independent in 2013.

== Discography ==
=== Singles ===
- Wasurerareta Sakura no Ki (忘れられた桜の木) (March 30, 2005)
- Break the Cocoon (July 21, 2005) — Speed Grapher anime ending theme song
- HIKARI / Daia no Hana (HIKARI/ダイアの花) (November 2, 2005)
  HIKARI — Muenzaka Kottōten (夢縁坂骨董店) ending theme song
  Daia no Hana — Black Cat anime opening theme song
- Saa Ima Kimi to (さあ今きみと) (January 18, 2006)
- Kokoro no Kagi (ココロの鍵) (November 14, 2007)

=== Albums ===
Indies (then known as より子。)

- Aizenaha (Aizenaha) (March 29, 2002, reissued: July 24, 2002) highest Oricon ranking: 26th
  Tracks were used on several TV shows on Fuji TV channels:
  "Honto wa ne" (ほんとはね。): used on Tenshi no Utagoe Shōni Byōtō no Kiseki (天使の歌声 小児病棟の奇跡) (theme song), and Sekai Micchaku TV! Ware Ware wa Chikyū-jin da! (世界密着TV!ワレワレハ地球人ダ!!) (insert song)
  "Plume Radio": Mecha-Mecha Iketeru! (めちゃ×2イケてるッ!) (ending theme song)
  "No name"：Sekai Micchaku TV! Ware Ware wa Chikyū-jin da! (世界密着TV!ワレワレハ地球人ダ!!) (insert song)
- gap (November 29, 2002, mini album) highest Oricon ranking: 86th. Oricon indies chart: 4th
  "gap": TBS show Count Down TV (ending theme song)

Post-indies

- Cocoon (January 26, 2005) highest Oricon ranking: 24th
- second VERSE (February 16, 2006) highest Oricon ranking: 78th
- Negau (願う) (January 16, 2008)
- Hikigatari 2 (弾き語り2) (December 1, 2010)
- My Soul (February 13, 2012)
