= Cat Planet Cuties =

Japanese light novel series

- Cover of the first light novel volume published by Media Factory

あそびにいくヨ!
- Genre: Harem, Action, Romantic comedy, science fiction
- Light novel
- Written by: Okina Kamino
- Illustrated by: Eizo Hoden (v. 1–14); Nishieda (v. 15–20)
- Published by: Media Factory
- Imprint: MF Bunko J
- Original run: October 25, 2003 – February 25, 2015
- Volumes: 20
- Manga

Let's Go Play
- Written by: Okina Kamino
- Illustrated by: 888
- Published by: Media Factory
- English publisher: NA: Digital Manga
- Magazine: Monthly Comic Alive
- Original run: July 20, 2010 – August 23, 2014
- Volumes: 10
- Anime television series
- Directed by: Yōichi Ueda
- Produced by: Akihiro Kurita; Jiyū Ōgi; Jun Fukuda; Yōichi Sekine; Yūichiro Takahata
- Written by: Katsuhiko Takayama
- Music by: Tomoki Kikuya
- Studio: AIC+
- Licensed by: AUS: Madman Entertainment; NA: Funimation; UK: Manga Entertainment
- Original network: MBS, AT-X, CTC, tvk, TVA, TVS, QAB
- English network: US: Funimation Channel
- Original run: July 10, 2010 – September 25, 2010
- Episodes: 12 + OVA

Cat Planet Cuties (あそびにいくヨ!, Asobi ni Iku Yo!; lit. 'Let's Go Play!') is a Japanese light novel series by Okina Kamino with illustrations by Eizo Hoden and Nishieda. The series, which consists of 20 volumes, was published by Media Factory under their MF Bunko J label from October 25, 2003, to February 25, 2015. A manga adaptation by 888 started serialization in the seinen manga magazine Monthly Comic Alive on August 26, 2006. An anime television series adaptation produced by AIC+ aired from July 10 to September 25, 2010. Funimation has licensed and dubbed the anime series in English with their in-house production voice cast and released it on home media in 2012. Manga Entertainment has licensed the series.

== Plot ==
Kio Kakazu is a kindhearted, yet sophisticated guy who is living a dull and boring life on Okinawa. One day, after attending a funeral for the death of one of his ancestors, he meets a catgirl named Eris. Soon, he finds her sleeping next to him half-naked. She explains to him that she is an alien and that she has come to Earth to learn more about its inhabitants, but unbeknownst to them, fanatical alien worshippers and mysterious organizations are in hot pursuit for Eris. To make matters worse, Kio's friends turn out to be a part of those organizations. It is up to Kio to protect Eris from these organizations.

== Media ==
=== Light novels ===
No.	Release date	ISBN
01	October 25, 2003	4-8401-0861-7
02	February 25, 2004	4-8401-1035-2
03	May 25, 2004	4-8401-1090-5
04	August 25, 2004	4-8401-1135-9
05	November 25, 2004	4-8401-1174-X
06	April 25, 2005	4-8401-1252-5
07	August 25, 2005	4-8401-1408-0
08	December 22, 2005	4-8401-1469-2
09	September 25, 2006	4-8401-1597-4
10	May 25, 2007	978-4-8401-1844-6
11	May 25, 2008	978-4-8401-2310-5
12	March 25, 2009	978-4-8401-2486-7
13	January 25, 2010	978-4-8401-3161-2
14	June 25, 2010	978-4-8401-3429-3
15	March 23, 2012	978-4-8401-4527-5
16	October 25, 2012	978-4-8401-4817-7
17	February 25, 2013	978-4-8401-4994-5
18	December 25, 2013	978-4-8401-4994-5
19	December 25, 2014	978-4-04-067309-7
20	February 25, 2015	978-4-04-067401-8

=== Manga ===
No.	Release date	ISBN
01	March 31, 2007	978-4-8401-1692-3
02	September 30, 2007	978-4-8401-1954-2
03	April 30, 2008	978-4-8401-2220-7
04	November 30, 2008	978-4-8401-2294-8
05	March 31, 2009	978-4-8401-2544-4
06	January 31, 2010	978-4-8401-2972-5
07	June 30, 2010	978-4-8401-3337-1
08	February 23, 2011	978-4-8401-3754-6
09	December 21, 2013	978-4-04-066147-6
10	August 23, 2014	978-4-04-066831-4

=== Anime ===
No.	Title	Original release date
1	"The Cat that Came to Earth"; Transliteration: "Chikiu ni Ochite Kita Neko" (Japanese: ちきうにおちてきたねこ)	July 10, 2010
The episode starts with three members of different factions listening to a special newscast about an alien message, the first part of which has been translated to mean "coming to play". One of the members, "Momiji", is then called to battle aboard an enemy ship. She successfully infiltrates the ship and disarms the Captain. The situation is disrupted by a UFO passing near both ships. When the same member comes there, the enemy captain detonates the ship. Later, during a memorial service for one of his ancestors, Kio Kakazu finds a cat-like alien sitting at the buffet table. The alien introduces herself as Eris, and the two have a short conversation before Kio accidentally drinks beer and passes out. The next day, Kio wakes up with a hangover and finds Eris sleeping half naked next to him in bed. Kio's startled cry and fall from his bed wakes her up, and she heals his hangover and minor head injury with a handheld device. Manami Kinjō and Maki Itokazu visit Kio, and upon seeing Eris half naked and with cat ears and a tail, they misinterpret the situation, thinking that Kio brought a girl home and forced her to cosplay all night before sleeping with her. After discovering that Eris is an alien, they both abruptly leave without saying why. Kio goes on a walk to gather his thoughts and runs into Aoi Futaba, who asks Kio on a date. Aoi is interrupted by a man in a car who she names as her Uncle. He offers her a ride home. It is later revealed that Manami is in recruiting to become part of the CIA, Aoi is Momiji and works for the Immigration Bureau of Japan, and Itokazu is the leader of an organization of SF fans called "Beautiful Contact", and they are all given orders to eliminate Eris.
2	"I Dropped By"; Transliteration: "Asobi ki Nimashita" (Japanese: あそびきにました)	July 17, 2010
Manami and Aoi watch Kio and Eris, both waiting for a good time to make their move. As they are waiting, however, Itokazu and "Beautiful Contact" attack Kio and Eris, and are about to kill both of them when Aoi disobeys orders to wait and saves Kio. She moves to kill Eris, but Kio begs Momiji (not knowing it is Aoi) to spare her. She obliges, but as soon as she leaves, Manami appears with CIA back-up, knocks Kio out and captures Eris, but not before Kio sees Manami's watch and knows it is her. Later, Kio confronts Manami and begs her to help him find Eris. Manami contacts Aoi for extra help, and, receiving help from his uncle, Kio blackmails Itokazu and Beautiful Contact into helping as well. Together, they succeed in breaking into the military compound where Eris has been given to the DIA, only to find that she has already broken herself out. The episode ends with the rest of the Catian fleet appearing over the city, announcing their existence and their intent to negotiate a treaty with the Japanese government, as a result of Eris submitting a report about grilled beef.
3	"We've Come to Stay"; Transliteration: "Tomari ki Nimashita" (Japanese: とまりきにました)	July 24, 2010
Eris, along with other ranking Catians, wearing stereotypical school swimsuits, negotiate with the Japanese government, due to misinformation on Eris' part Later, while the robotic servants are on guard duty and Manami and Aoi are bathing together, one of the robots is abducted by members of a yet unknown faction. Manami and Aoi spring into action, rescuing the robot, although the intruders escaped by use of a stun grenade. The next day, Manami, Aoi, and Kio are hired by Eris as official embassy employees. Manami discovers Aoi's feelings for Kio, and offers to help her out, though Manami's reactions throughout the episode lead Aoi to suspect that she may have feelings for him as well. Note: Natsuru Seno and Shizuku Sango from Kämpfer made cameo appearances.
4	"We've Come to Kidnap You"; Transliteration: "Sarai ki Nimashita" (Japanese: さらいきにました)	July 31, 2010
The episode opens on the Saitama Super Arena filled with members of Underside of Kitten Paw, a fanatic group obsessed with cats. Their leader, Antonia Morfenoss, shows pictures of Eris and declares her to be their new idol of worship. When Kio wakes up, he walks in on Eris dancing and being abnormally energetic due to having smelled silver vine spirits, an Asian plant reported to be stronger than catnip. Dr. Durel appears and explains that Eris will soon be going into heat, causing her to have heightened senses, and congratulates Eris on having Kio as her mating partner on her first heat, much to Manami's outrage and Kio's embarrassment. She also assigns Eris a mission to go into Tokyo and "observe the human economy, technology, and culture", which, according to Eris, means to bring back a bunch of toys and games as souvenirs. On the train back, members of Underside of Kitten Paw separate Eris and Kio from Manami and Aoi, putting them to sleep and showing the sleeping Eris live to the screaming fans of Underside of Kitten Paw. Note: In this episode, Louise from The Familiar of Zero, and Lisa, Cecily Cambell, and Luke Ainsworth from The Sacred Blacksmith made cameo appearances while they were at the Nakona Broadway shortly after the airplane scene.
5	"We've Come to Rescue You"; Transliteration: "Tasuke ki Nimashita" (Japanese: たすけきにました)	August 7, 2010
Kio and Eris wake up inside a yacht owned by Antonia. They are soon greeted by one of Antonia's maids, who offer them trays of gourmet food. After eating, they decide to escape, but to their dismay Eris's power suit has been limited due to Eris being in heat. They are taken to a play room with Antonia who is dressed like a giant Assist-a-roid. Kio notes that all of the video games have been fixed to only accommodate one player, due to the maids not having the heart either to beat their master in a game nor lose intentionally. Meanwhile, Aoi and Manami visit a weapons store and stock up. While there, they ask for a motor boat and are told the only one was sold to Director Kawasaki for his upcoming film. The girls infiltrate the set and rig the boat with real weapons, but they are caught by Kawasaki, who contracts them into his film. After being forced into Playboy-like costumes, Aoi and Manami steal the boat and break into the yacht to find that Kio and Eris have switched clothes, enabling Kio to use the power suit's strength-enhancing capabilities. They are stopped by Antonia and one of her maids, but Kio convinces Antonia to let them go. Antonia offers them escape in the emergency sea plane. Aoi sabotages the ship's engines, but is caught by an agent of Dogsia, who is destroying the ship in the hopes that it will take Eris with it. Aoi is trapped by a pile of steel girders and then knocked unconscious by a missile explosion, to be saved by Kio still in Eris's suit. As Kio runs to catch the plane, Aoi regains consciousness, and thinking it is a dream, confesses to Kio.
6	"I've Practiced"; Transliteration: "Renshiu Shimashita" (Japanese: れんしうしました)	August 14, 2010
Kio takes Eris to a film shoot directed by one of his classmates, who is trying to film a sci-fi film and would like Eris's help in getting footage of aliens without special effects. They decide that Eris looks too human, and instead ask her if they could use her ship or her robots. The footage of the ship looks like it is being held by strings due to its design, and the robots look more like chibi dolls. They decide to go for a romance film. Upon hearing this, Eris' hormones go berserk and she assaults Kio, something she has done several times earlier anytime something one has said sounds similar to romance or sex. Meanwhile, Aoi wants to practice cooking to impress Kio, but due to her frequent failures she wastes a lot of food. At the same time, Manami wants to practice shooting, but she cannot do it in Kio's backyard. Chaika takes them to a virtual room on board the mothership, where they can fulfill their respective desires without it bothering anyone. She also makes it a point that the Catia without mates use it to satisfy their sexual desires during heat and offered if they would like to try it out as well, much to the girls' embarrassment. Aoi asks for a Kio to be her taste-tester. Manami asks for a shooting gallery with a wide assortment of weaponry, and for an M134 Minigun in particular, which turns out to be too heavy for her to lift. She asks for a Kio to help her lift it, who tells her in a very Kio-like manner that he cannot lift it. Manami asks virtual-Kio what he thinks of various people, eventually ending up on herself. He confesses that he once had feelings for her, but when he heard she was hanging out with Jack (unaware this was her female CIA handler), he thought she was already dating someone and she ended up being just a friend. Back at home, Aoi gives the real Kio a taste of a recipe she "perfected" with virtual-Kio, only to find out that virtual-Kio had lied to make Aoi feel good about her cooking. Chaika points out that virtual-Kio and the real Kio would naturally have different thoughts, but Manami still has her doubts. The episode ends with Eris taking pills that will, to her extreme disappointment, prematurely end her first mating season. The episode ends with her sadly calling out to Kio. Note: In this episode, Mamoru and Yuna from Kage Kara Mamoru! also appeared during the A&W Drive Thru scene.
7	"We've Come to Swim"; Transliteration: "Oyogi ki Nimashita" (Japanese: およぎきにました)	August 21, 2010
The summer ends, and Kio, Manami and Aoi all return to school. To their surprise, they find that Eris and Antonia have enrolled in the same class as them, as well as Antonia's maids. After school, Eris and Antonia garner excessive amounts of attention to the point that Antonia's maids scare off other students with Brügger & Thomet MP9s. Kio's club-mates ask him if he is going to the film camp, and asks Eris if she would like to go on the trip as well. As a result, Eris, Antonia, Aoi, Manami, and Antonia's maids all become members of the film club with the intention of going to the camp. Meanwhile, a group of Dogsian Assist-a-roids are robbing surrounding areas of electronic equipment, due to their inability to self-repair. The Dogsian ambassadors reveal a specially made Assist-a-roid that closely resembles a Catian Assist-a-roid. Once at the camp, Antonia offers Eris a number of high-end swim suits for her to wear. When the other girls inquire about all of the ones that Eris refuses, Antonia allows them to wear the ones Eris does not like. Later, when they are all showing off their expensive swimsuits, the girls realize to their dismay that they have all had holes cut in the rear to accommodate Eris' tail, due to Aiko, one of the girls mistakenly wearing her bottom piece backwards. At dinner, Kio asks if he can talk to Aoi about something in private, but ends up asking if she can teach him to fight. Once alone, Aoi realizes that she is out of her league in the running for Kio. Eris appears, and Aoi takes out her frustration on her. Suddenly, a young girl named Ichika appears, and at the same time, the camp gets attacked by the Dogsian Assist-a-roids. They are easily defeated with the help of some Accel-Form cards that give Aoi inhanced speed and strength, and later when the specially made Dogsian Assist-a-roid appears to help them in their fight. Note: In this episode, Akane and Mikoto from the series Kämpfer also appeared, just before the scene when Eris and the gang walk around the school.
8	"We Had a Duel"; Transliteration: "Kettō Shimashita" (Japanese: けっとうしました)	August 28, 2010
Aoi and Manami decide to have a showdown in a nearby forest to settle their differences, but their match is cut short when they must join forces to defeat some assassins sent to take them both out, the winner was therefore Manami. As the loser, Aoi is forced to address Kio by his first name, but he does not notice at all, causing Manami to react violently.
9	"The Grand First Assistroid?"; Transliteration: "Idai naru Saisho no Ashitoroido?" (Japanese: いだいなるさいしょのあしとろいど?)	September 4, 2010
Kio and friends are visited by Lawry, the first Assist-a-roid created by the Catians, who came to fulfill the last wish of her creators, who died while trying to reach Earth 1000 years ago. Note: The ending theme Oira wa Sabishii Spaceman was taken from the Captain Future Original Soundtrack.
10	"We Came After You"; Transliteration: "Nerai ki Nimashita" (Japanese: ねらいきにました)	September 11, 2010
On Christmas Eve, the Catians plan a special present to mankind, while Qoone, the captain of the Catian mothership pays a visit to Kio's house. However, the festivities are interrupted when the Dogsians launch an attack on them.
11	"I Came Looking for You"; Transliteration: "Sagashi ki Nimashita" (Japanese: さがしきにました)	September 18, 2010
With the Catian ship en route of collision with the Earth atmosphere, threatening the trapped Catian crews' lives, and Qoone out of commission, Kio is appointed the new captain of the Catian forces. The Dogsians feed misinformation causing all world rockets to be suspended for a planned attack on the ship. Kio and the others set off to abandoned launch base in Russia as part of their plan to aid their friends in space. Meanwhile, when Manami tries to force Kio to think about Aoi's feelings for him, Aoi confronts her and reprimands her for this, as she tells her to stop pitying her as she never asked for her help. Manami argues back that Kio and Eris could be together and asks if she is well, not telling Kio her feelings. However, Aoi calls out her hypocrisy, figuring out that Manami is in love with Kio too, but refuses to act upon them and questions why she can't be honest with her own feelings, lectures her for forcing her to do what she couldn't do just because she can't be honest with herself. Both girls slap each other, but before thing can escalate further, someone infiltrates the base, and they are forced to put aside this for the time being. A spy out for revenge on Aoi, and an army of NATO soldiers thinking they are terrorists try to stop them. Aoi manages to put a stop to the spy and he is arrested. Note: When listening to the first part prior to the credits you will hear a parody of the Red Dwarf theme and comments to pay homage to Red Dwarf.
12	"I Came to Find You"; Transliteration: "Mitsuke ki Nimashita" (Japanese: みつけきにました)	September 25, 2010
While Antonia's maid army holds off the advancing military, Kio and the others are able to launch. Manami and Aoi get into another argument as the former once again tries to get Aoi to confess to Kio, but the latter scolds her for keeping her own feelings for Kio to herself and accuses her of being a coward. Manami tells her to stop, but their argument gets noticed by Kio and Eris, with Kio questioning the purpose of their argument and Eris asks how they can fix the problem, Manami finally admits that Eris is the problem, blaming her for "stealing" Kio away from her, which is why she could not admit her feelings, because she feels she cannot compete with Eris, that she was jealous of her looks and her closeness to Kio. Aoi asks why Manami kept trying to set her up with Kio, she tells her it's so she could have a chance with Kio because she thought she lost hers, but realizes she pushed him away. After knowing her true feelings, Eris tells Manami and Aoi they can all love him, but they are skeptical about it. She resolves the situation by explaining that in her homeland, they can have more than one lover and states that all three of them can be his lovers. With that, Aoi, Manami and Eris all confess their feelings by kissing Kio. Then, the three girls launch in powered armor and jet platforms to fight the Dogsian armada. While struggling to save the Catian ship, Kio is forced to use Qoone's captain bell to transform himself and save the ship. After Eris, Manami, and Aoi finish off the Dogsian fleet, the command ship crashes into its own orbital base, causing it to plummet to Japan. Aoi flies by herself to stop it, only for Manami to join her. After a late save from Kio in the rocket they all hug, only to find Kio has become a Catboy. After solving their situation in space, the Catians finally unveil their Christmas present to mankind; a fully functional space elevator resembling a Christmas tree.
OVA	"Come Drop By"; Transliteration: "de Asobi ni Kimashita!!" (Japanese: おーぶいえーであそびにきました!!)	June 15, 2011
During the summer, the Catians decide to study the games on Earth so they decided to help. To make things more interesting, Manami suggested that each participant wages a precious item and whenever each person wins a round they chose one of them as a reward. While Aoi and Manami covet a special item waged by Kio, their priorities change when they are risking to let a DVD with embarrassing scenes of both in wrong hands.

=== Drama CDs ===
A series of four drama CDs were released by Geneon Entertainment.

=== Video game ===
A video game adaptation Cat Planet Cuties ～Chikyû Pinchi no Konyaku Sengen～ (あそびにいくヨ！～ちきゅうぴんちのこんやくせんげん～) developed by Idea Factory was released on PlayStation 2 on July 27, 2006.
