= List of Speed Grapher characters =

The Speed Grapher anime series features an extensive cast of characters created by Yuusuke Kozaki and Masashi Ishihama. The series takes place in a fictional universe where the rich and powerful can have their deepest desires filled by a fetish club called the Roppongi Club. The series follows the discovery of the girl at the center of the club and one man's quest to free her.

Speed Grapher's main character is Tatsumi Saiga, a veteran war journalist who now survives on photographing for tabloids. He discovers the Roppongi Club while stalking for the newspaper and meets Kagura Tennōzu. He takes her from the club and tries to escape the influence of Chōji Suitengu with the help of others. Suitengu, wishing to have Kagura back in his control, sends club members, all Euphorics who were granted special powers based on their desires, to stop them.

== Main characters ==
=== Tatsumi Saiga ===
Tatsumi Saiga from Speed Grapher

Tatsumi Saiga (雑賀 辰巳, Saiga Tatsumi) is the male protagonist of the series. He is a veteran war journalist who, despite all the death and carnage he witnessed, somehow took a liking to it. His love for photography soon develops into a sexual fetish where he gets an erection whenever he takes an exciting picture. However, after returning to Japan, his passion seems to have died.

While investigating a secret club where rich and influential people meet to fulfill their most perverse desires, he receives a kiss from Kagura and develops the ability to make anything he photographs explode - "Death by Photograph". Saiga can also enhance his ability by using different kinds of camera and lens, such as improving the range and power of his attacks by using a telescopic lens instead of a regular one. He can also psychically load film into his camera. It revealed later on in the series that Saiga was infected by the virus on the same island that Suitengu was after getting buried underneath a mountain of rubble. Funnily enough, Saiga uses a Nikon camera and what appear to be Nikkor lenses despite the title of the series, and is never depicted with a Speed Graphic). When using his powers, Saiga's camera gains a black aura whilst his shooting eye turns bloodshot as the iris becomes green and large veins protrude around it. Although he is thrown headfirst into a battle he does not fully understand, Saiga has demonstrated a natural prowess for combat as he is able to keep a cool head while under fire and has even demonstrated a level of training in close-quarters fighting; no doubt he picked up these kind of skills after years of being a war photographer.

Over the course of the series, Saiga grows more and more protective of Kagura. At first acting like a sort of teacher for her, showing the young girl the world she never saw. When anyone questions whether he is in love with her, he casually brushes it off saying "it's not like that", or just ignoring the question altogether. However, in the final episode when Kagura says the world would be better off if she and Suitengu were dead, Saiga admits to her that he loves her and wants her to live more than anything. Five years after Suitengu's coup d'etat, a now blind Saiga is taking pictures of the sunset, when a twenty-year-old Kagura walks through the laundry drying in the sun. He then says "welcome back", and the two embrace as the screen moves up toward the sunset.

His Japanese voice actor is Yūji Takada. Christopher Sabat provides his voice in the English version.

=== Kagura Tennōzu ===
Kagura Tennozu as the club's "goddess" from Speed Grapher

Kagura Tennōzu (天王洲 神楽, Tennōzu Kagura) is the female protagonist and a student at the elite and prestigious St. Ignatius Academy. Raised as the heir to the powerful Tennōzu Group, her bodily fluids contain an enzyme that has the ability to transform people infected with a mysterious virus into Euphorics (people with supernatural powers related to their innermost desires). She also has an inoperable brain tumor, causing her to only have six months left to live. Associates of Suitengu have given her injections to keep her from reaching puberty as this will apparently cause her to stop producing the enzyme, not to mention Shinsen starves her to almost death.

Even though Saiga doesn't acknowledge his feelings about Kagura, she has no problem expressing the fact that she wants to be at his side no matter what. When Saiga comes to terms with his feelings and Kagura sees how much he changes she often jokes about how "uncool" he has become, but nevertheless she still loves him. Before Saiga's fight with Suitengu he tells Kagura his feelings, which makes her very happy. Then tells Ginza to take Kagura to the island where Ryōgoku is, so he can treat her right away. After five years she returns to Japan to be at Saiga's side.

Her voice actress in the original Japanese version is Kei Shindou, and she is voiced by Monica Rial in the English version.

== Tokyo Police Department ==
=== Hibari Ginza ===
Hibari Ginza from Speed Grapher

Hibari Ginza (銀座 ひばり, Ginza Hibari) is a vicious policewoman who is in love with Saiga. She gets jealous very easily and will do anything she can to protect him from potential harm. She has a joking habit of saying "self-defense" whenever she shoots or kills someone, usually right before or directly after they attack her. She blackmails Saiga into having sex with her by stealing his camera and promising to give it back after. She is very envious of Kagura and makes a deal with Shinsen to recapture her if she can "keep" Saiga. After returning Kagura, she takes an unconscious Saiga back to her apartment. Ginza begins to become depressed when people tell her things about Saiga she didn't know. She really goes off the handle when Suitengu tells her that she severely underestimated the worth of Saiga and Kagura to the Tennōzu Group, after which she tried to bargain for his life in exchange for a petty conman. Ginza eventually realizes that she cannot stop Saiga from loving Kagura and helps him to stay alive. Even though she is angry when Saiga tells Kagura that he loves her, Ginza agrees to take her to the island where Ryōgoku is in order to get treatment. When Kagura resists, saying that she wants to stay with Saiga, Ginza states that she was heartbroken when Saiga confessed his love to Kagura but cannot let her die as a matter of pride, Ginza then proceeds to swiftly knock Kagura unconscious. It is revealed at the end of the series that Ginza does eventually find happiness with Dr. Ryōgoku.

She is voiced by Takako Honda in the original Japanese version and by Clarine Harp in the English version.

=== Shiina ===
Ginza's partner in the force, Shiina (椎名) tends to be very scared of Ginza and pretty much follows her orders without so much as thinking of telling her no. It is also revealed that he is an amateur photographer as well as a big fan of Saiga's work. At the end of the series, Shiina finally manages to become a photographer (even taking over Saiga's old job) but is constantly degraded because his skills are inferior to Saiga's, despite his blindness.

His Japanese voice actor is Jin Yamanoi and his English voice actor is Anthony Bowling.

=== Chief Ekoda ===
Chief Ekoda (江古田) is the Chief of the Tokyo Police Department, notable for his diminutive stature. When he was first introduced, Ekoda seems like a relatively normal man, albeit not a very strong-willed one, but later on it is revealed that not only is he a member of Suitengu's club, but he also has an extreme leg fetish; cutting off the legs of numerous women (even his wife and daughter's) and proudly displaying them in a special room inside his house.

After being confronted by Ginza for his involvement with Suitengu, Ekoda manages to subdue her with sleeping drugs, taking her to his place and binding her to a chair. Ekoda then admits that he has always lusted after Ginza's legs and that wishes to cut them off and add them to his collection. Luckily, before he can do this, Ginza manages to free herself enough to wrap her legs around his neck and snap it once he comes too close to her.

His voice actor in the original Japanese series is Naoki Makishima and his English voice actor is Mike McFarland.

== Roppongi Club/Tennōzu Group ==
=== Chōji Suitengu ===
Choji Suitengu from Speed Grapher

Chōji Suitengu (水天宮 寵児, Suitengu Chōji) is the main antagonist of the series, a ruthless businessman who runs the Roppongi Club, a place for the wealthy and influential to indulge in their fetishes. He is also a Euphoric, possessing the ability to freely manipulate his own blood and use it for either attack, defend, or movement. At first, it seems like he was only using Kagura and her mother to extend his influence and profits, but as the series goes on, it appears that Suitengu has a hidden vengeance plan in his agenda. He is often seen carries around a music box that belonged to his younger sister, Yui.

Long ago, Suitengu was known as "Ueno Takeshi" and he used to live a normal, happy life with parents and younger sister. However, everything changed when his parents were murdered after failing to pay a large debt they owed to the Ashikaga Group; then predecessors of the Tennōzu Group. Yui and Takeshi were separated, the latter being given to a gun-using sergeant before getting turned into a soldier while the former was sold into prostitution. Takeshi grew up on the battlefield, told that every kill he made reduced his parents' debt and brought him that much closer to freedom. His last mission was infiltrating a research lab, but the facility was destroyed and Takeshi was severely wounded, losing one of his arms, in the destruction. However, he contracted the Euphoria virus as a result of this and was thus retrieved and repaired by the research lab's remaining scientists so that they could preserve their work. They grafted different body parts from his mercenary team as well as the arm of Kazuki Odawara, Kagura's father and the scientist who not only developed the research, but who also possessed the enzyme which awaken his power. Takeshi eventually managed to escape, changing his name to "Suitengu Choji" and beginning to plot his ultimate revenge.

Suitengu despises the fact his family and life were ruined because of money and thus hold a secret, yet deep-seated hatred for it. Eventually, he was reunited with his sister, but was horrified to discover her state of mind had been shattered from years of abuse in the sex industry. As he held her with bloody tears streaming down his eyes, he reluctantly euthanized Yui to end her suffering. His ultimate goal was to take revenge on the Prime Minister who destroyed his peaceful life and punish people steeped in greed and money by causing the entire country to go bankrupt. To flout his wealth, he rolls his cigarettes using 10,000 yen bills.

His voice actor in the original Japanese series is Toshiyuki Morikawa and his English voice actor is Christopher Ayres.

=== Shinsen Tennōzu ===
Shinsen Tennōzu (天王洲 神泉, Tennōzu Shinsen) is Kagura's mother and president of Tennōzu Group. However, before all of that, Shinsen had been an aspiring model scouted by a woman known as Gōtokuji. She would have her body "remodeled" by a doctor named Kazuki Odawara, whom she soon fell in love with. Despite her rise to fame, Shinsen chose to leave it all behind and marry Kazuki, even signing their marriage licenses and waiting several days for him to arrive at the hot spring they'd chosen as their meeting place, but he never came. Left heartbroken and bitter, Shinsen returned to Tokyo and eventually gave birth to Kagura, whom she views as the ultimate symbol of Kazuki's betrayal. She would spend her time punishing the girl, either starving her to near death or even having sex with one of her female teachers just so Kagura would catch them in the act, purely out of spite for the girl's father.

Although she seems to be in love with Suitengu, Shinsen realizes he was just a replacement for Kazuki in her loneliness. While incredibly cruel to Kagura and many others throughout the series, Shinsen's incredibly kind to Gōtokuji (whose injuries she believes are her fault), showing a different, more compassionate side. Seeing Suitengu's true nature, Shinsen once again intended to leave fame behind to try and live a quiet life but is then strangled to death by Suitengu, using Kazuki's left arm. Before Shinsen died, Suitengu reveals to her why his left arm always felt so loving by saying: "You were always caressed by your true love's arm". She then learns from Kagura that Kazuki had indeed come for her and that she wasn't abandoned, to which she gives a slight chuckle upon realizing how foolish she had been.

Her voice actress in the original Japanese series is Gara Takashima and her English voice actress is Pam Dougherty.

=== Tsujidō ===
Tsujidō (辻堂) is Suitengu's right-hand man and accompanies him wherever he goes, often as a personal attendant. His Euphoria power is supernaturally olfaction which allows him to smell enemies from miles away. Unlike most Euphorics, Tsujido does not require a physical transformation in order to use his ability. However, in during his fight against Ginza in the last episode, Tsujido shows that he also has the ability to transform himself into a large wolf, granting him enhanced speed and agility as well as natural weapons.

Along with Makabe, Tsujido was captured and abused by local Yakuza but was rescued by Suitengu. However, he'd already gotten his nose cut off and was very near death because of the blood loss. He chooses to stay behind with Makabe in order to protect Suitengu when the building is under attack. Despite serious injuries, he manages to find and carry Suitengu to the generator's control room, where he dies alongside him as the main office of the Tennouzu group self-destructs.

Tsujido's voice actor in the Japanese anime is Hiro Yūki and his English voice actor is Greg Ayres.

=== Makabe ===
One of the men who works under Tsujido, Makabe (真壁) is a bear of a man and doesn't talk as much, unlike his partner, Niihari.

He tends to be more professional of the two when it comes to getting the job done. When tracking down Kagura and Saiga with Niihari and Tsujido, he often acts as the driver. After getting captured and beaten unconscious by Yakuza, Suitengu appears to rescue both him and Tsujido; slaughters all but one of them. Because of this, Makabe feels a great sense of gratitude toward Suitengu which leads to him staying behind with Tsujido in order to help him. During the assault on the main office, the ceiling collapses due to a rocket barrage and he dies protecting Tsujido from being crushed.

His Japanese voice actor is Hisao Egawa while Bob Carter serves as his English voice actor.

=== Niihari ===
Niihari (新治) is the other henchman working under Tsujido. Unlike his more silent partner, Makabe, Niihari has a habit of talking a lot and speaking with profoundly foul language at times. He has mentioned failed relationships with women in his life; his mother betraying his father and himself and then his wife being overly greedy. Niihari was the first henchman that Suitengu met as he was outside the building Makabe and Tsujido were kept, nervously holding a sword as he was preparing to rescue them both. He is the only one of the Tennouzu Group to survive and in the end of the series, Niihari has become a successful businessman who intends to one day build three colossal towers and name them after Suitengu, Tsujido, and Makabe. Kenjiro Tsuda provides the Japanese voice for Niihari and Robert McCollum is his English voice actor.

== Euphorics ==
Humans that have been infected with a never named retro-virus and then exposed to the catalyst within Kagura, granting them powers based on their deepest desires. They are all V.I.P. members of the Roppongi Club that were infected by Suitengu and now perform special jobs, usually assassinations, for the club's benefit in exchange for extra "services".

=== Katsuya Shirogane ===
One of the Euphorics sent by Suitengu to retrieve Kagura from Saiga, Katsuya Shirogane (白金 克也, Shirogane Katsuya) possesses the ability to stretch and contort his body into any imaginable form, making it appear as if he were made of rubber.

Known as the "Rubber Gimp", he is a famous ballet dancer completely obsessed with the flexibility of rubber to the point where he broke a young girl's arm for "being too stiff". Katsuya met his end when Saiga blew off his head using a piece of mirror to reflect his camera shot.

His Japanese voice actor is Takehito Koyasu and his English voice actor is J. Michael Tatum.

=== Kaoru Koganei ===
Madame Kaoru Koganei (小金井 薫, Koganei Kaoru), best known as "Lady Diamond", is a socialite whose Euphoric power allows her to change her entire body into diamond, making her nearly indestructible. She can also extend her fingernails to stab and cut her opponents.

She fuels her power by eating diamonds, even biting off the finger of a woman to get her ring. She was the wife of a talented but troubled artist who gave her diamonds to make her happy, but hanged himself after taking out an insurance policy. Since then, Koganei has become obsessed with making her body into a shining monument of his love for her. In her diamond form, her translucent body made it hard for Saiga's camera to focus on her. However, unlike some of the other Euphorics, Koganei does not hand Kagura back to the club and instead demands a ransom of diamonds for her. Eventually, Saiga returns for a second battle, this time with a way to beat her. Using a can of spray paint, Saiga is able to create points along Koganei's body for his camera to focus on, leading to her losing her arm and fleeing only to be found and killed by Suitengu for her betrayal, her body getting shattered into a million pieces of diamond which are then sold. The last shot of her was her shattered face shedding a tear.

Her Japanese voice actress is Mari Yokō and her English voice actress is Colleen Clinkenbeard.

=== Toshiki Mizunoguchi ===
Toshiki Mizunoguchi (溝ノ口 敏輝, Mizunoguchi Toshiki) is a sadistic dentist and Euphoric user that can grow spider-like limbs armed with dental devices from his body and can even turn other parts of his body like his tongue into drills. He loves torturing his "patients" by inserting all of his limbs into their mouths and polishing their teeth slowly.

Apparently, he removed Kagura's lower molars three years ago, but did it as slow as he possibly could so that he could see Kagura writhing in pain and even kept one of them as a "treasure" of sorts and carves it obsessively. He even requested that Kagura be sent to him for a monthly "cleaning" after retrieving her. Mizunoguchi died after Saiga blew his head off, his prized tooth laying beside the hand of his now lifeless body.

He is voiced by Shiro Gō in the original Japanese version and by R Bruce Elliott in the English version.

=== Ran Yurigaoka ===
Ran Yurigaoka (百合ヶ丘 蘭, Yurigaoka Ran) is an esthetician that derives pleasure from using his Euphoric powers, which enable him to bring his tattoos to life, to merge into the skin of women and then killing them.

He primarily uses the large spider on his back for quick and easy travel while the skull and dagger on his arm is for battle and the miniature spiders are used to control other people's bodies by merging them with their skin. With help from Ginza, Saiga was able to destroy Ran's body, leaving only his legs and fragments of skin.

His voice actor in the original Japanese version is Takeshi Kusao, and he is voiced by Christopher Bevins in the English version.

=== Father Kanda ===
A corrupt Priest, who'd given all of the Church's donation money to the Roppongi Club in order to pay for his Membership dues, Father Kanda (神田) is a Euphoric with powers over electricity. He can also transform into wires and control thunder bolts.

Due to his powers, Father Kanda believes himself to be a God. He was to be the minister at Kagura and Suitengu's wedding, but Saiga's interruption made him want to try and kill him after he destroys part of the chapel which Kanda felt was a worthy tribute to himself.

In the end he killed himself after using his powers to try and electrocute Saiga after being seriously injured, thereby blowing himself up.

His Japanese voice actor is Ryūzaburō Ōtomo and his English voice actor is Bill Flynn.

=== Miharu Shirumaku ===
Miharu Shirumaku (弦巻 ミハル, Shirumaku Miharu) is a former actress traumatized by her mother trying to drown her in a murder-suicide attempt, leaving her mute. She has also drowned every man who has fallen in love with her. Appropriately, Miharu's Euphoria power allows her to turn into a fish-like being, resembling a cross between a traditional mermaid and a human-fish hybrid, as well as granting her the ability to manipulate and even become water.

However, despite her mother's actions, she still loves her and sees water as a substitute for her mother's embrace. in fact, in a flashback before her death, it is revealed that she begged her mother to "take her with her", indicating that she wanted to drown with her mother, and showing her smiling as she and her mother were sinking.

Miharu died after overusing her power, causing her liquid form to evaporate into the atmosphere. Before her death she managed to speak, saying "At last, I can be with her" referring to her mother.

Her voice actress in the original Japanese version is Maya Okamoto, and she is voiced by Laura Bailey in the English version.

=== Seiji Ochiai ===
A former photographer, Seiji Ochiai (落合 征二, Ochiai Seiji) is now a cabinet member who leads a group called the White Eagles whose purpose was to bring down the Prime Minister and Suitengu. However, he turned out to be a traitor and Euphoric who could manipulate sound by using the speakers embedded in his body. The sound he emits can cause internal damage to the body and can reduce objects to dust. He loves music and, when using his powers, pretends he is a conductor. He turned to Saiga to help him bring down Suitengu and Kamiya, but in reality he only wanted to get rid of him and anyone else who could expose the truth. During his battle with Saiga he reveals that he believes that the media exists to hide the truth. After a tough battle with Saiga, he was killed when Saiga got close enough to him to use a miniature camera. While he is not seen dead, it is assumed he died. His voice actor in the original Japanese version is Tetsuo Kaneo, and he is voiced by Jerry Russell in the English version.

=== Katsuji Kamiya ===
The Prime Minister of Japan, Katsuji Kamiya (神谷 勝二, Kamiya Katsuji), is also a member of the club and has an extreme desire of gluttony. He secretly plans with his cabinet members to take control of the club and Kagura for themselves. He also has a Euphoric power in which he becomes a deformed spider-like creature with a huge head, spider legs with eating utensils attached, and a stretchable tongue with acidic saliva. He was the man responsible for Suitengu's slavery; however, he did not realize this until Suitengu himself revealed his true identity. Kamiya begs for his life and tries to bargain Suitengu with the whereabouts of his sister, only to find out Suitengu already found her, and is brutally killed. His voice actor in the original Japanese version is Takehiro Koyama, and his English voice actor is John Swasey.

== Others ==
=== Bob ===
The main source of comic relief in the show, Bob (ボブ, Bobu) is an out and proud flamboyant homosexual who runs an erotic massage parlour. He lives right next door to Saiga, whom he has a crush on, and seems to be a Westerner. He also has a transgender sister who runs a club where Saiga and Kagura hide for a while. His voice actor in the original Japanese version is Kouji Ishii, and his English voice actor is Antimere Robinson.

=== Kazuki Odawara ===
Kazuki Odawara is Shinsen's former lover and Kagura's father. He was a scientist who did work developing a bioweapon. However, the government soon tried to eliminate all traces of evidence. He died in a ravine and the remains of his research lay within Kagura, who can awaken the virus within carriers, and Suitengu, who has his left arm. How he died is never revealed as Suitengu had the arm grafted onto him by the scientists who made him a Euphoric, they themselves had the arm in a preservation tank. His voice actor in the original Japanese version is Hidenari Ugaki, and his English voice actor is John Burgmeier.

=== Professor Nishiya ===
Professor Nishiya is a university professor who is an acquaintance of Ryougoku's. He tells Saiga about the retrovirus that has been activated within him and introduces Saiga to Ochiai. However, he sold them out so he could do research on Kagura to gain fame. After feeling he had been double-crossed he took Kagura and drank a bottle containing the virus he extracted from Saiga, making himself a carrier. He then attempted to rape Kagura in order to become a euphoric, only to be stopped by Kamiya's men. He is eaten by a mutated Kamiya as his dissolving corpse is seen in his mouth. His voice actor in the original Japanese version is Eiji Yanagisawa, and his English voice actor is Barry Yandell.

=== Doctor Genba Ryōgoku ===
Doctor Genba Ryōgoku (両国 玄蕃, Ryōgoku Genba) is a doctor who runs a small clinic and also an acquaintance of Saiga's who apparently saved his (Saiga's) life when he was nearly crippled in a rundown hospital. His wife died three months ago to cancer. He later discovers the key to curing Kagura from Nishiya's notes. After curing her he is last seen tending to wounded people in Africa with Ginza as his nurse and lover. His voice actor in the original Japanese version is Rikiya Koyama, and his English voice actor is Kent Williams.

== Reception ==
Reviewers generally liked the character designs in Speed Grapher. IGN commented that Speed Grapher is largely character-driven and positively noted many characters. Anime News Network liked the minor villains because they were more developed than "the norm for bad guys in their roles," though Suitengu was criticized for being bland. ANN also noted that "Many of its character designs are a little rough" compared to other Gonzo releases and that their animation was "frequently bad." SciFi Weekly pointed out that though many characters' stories were deeply explored, they were thrown together in a baffling manner. In addition, SciFi Weekly disliked how many characters were "almost as throwaways" and how they "tend to make brief appearances and then disappear without comment."
