= Speed Grapher =

Japanese anime series

- British cover of the first DVD volume
- Genre: Psychological; Supernatural; Suspense
- Anime television series
- Directed by: Kunihisa Sugishima
- Produced by: Naomi Nishiguchi; Taichi Hashimoto
- Written by: Shin Yoshida
- Music by: Shinkichi Mitsumune
- Studio: Gonzo
- Licensed by: Crunchyroll: UK: MVM Films
- Original network: TV Asahi
- English network: US: IFC; ZA: Animax
- Original run: April 7, 2005 – September 29, 2005
- Episodes: 24
- Light novel
- Written by: Minoru Niki
- Illustrated by: Yuusuke Kozaki
- Published by: Hayakawa Publishing
- Published: July 21, 2005
- Manga
- Published by: MediaWorks
- English publisher: NA: Titan Comics; SG: Chuang Yi
- Magazine: Dengeki Comic Gao!
- Original run: September 27, 2005 – September 27, 2006
- Volumes: 3

Speed Grapher (stylized as SPEED GRAPHER) is a 2005 anime series produced by Gonzo. The series ran for 24 episodes from April to October 2005 on TV Asahi. It tells the story of former war photographer, Tatsumi Saiga and his quest to save Kagura Tennōzu from Chōji Suitengu and the members of a fetish club, the Roppongi Club. In 2006, the series was licensed for release in North America by Funimation and aired on the Independent Film Channel between March 7 and August 15, 2008.

The series was adapted into a manga by Tomozo. Originally serialized by MediaWorks in Monthly Dengeki Comic GAO!, it was released to three tankōbon between September 2005 and September 2006. The manga series was then licensed to Chuang Yi, who released the three volumes in English and Chinese in Singapore, and later to Tokyopop, who released the first two volumes in North America in September and December 2008. A light novel was also created and was written by Minoru Niki. It was published by Hayakawa Publishing and released on July 21, 2005.

== Plot ==
Speed Grapher follows the exploits of former war photographer Tatsumi Saiga, who investigates a secret fetish club for the ultra-wealthy called the Roppongi Club. He tries to photograph the club's "goddess", a 15-year-old, exploited girl named Kagura, but is discovered. As he is about to be killed, Kagura kisses him, granting him the ability to destroy anything he photographs. Saiga soon discovers that Kagura's body fluids, like her saliva, in combination with a certain "virus", can give people bizarre abilities relating to their secret desires, fetishes, and obsessions. Club members strive for the honor of becoming "gifted" via Kagura's power. Saiga soon becomes entangled in this secret underground society and the powerful and corrupt Tennōzu Group mega-corporation that operates it. He attempts to free Kagura, a move that puts the two of them on the run from the Tennōzu Group and blood-thirsty members of the club with bizarre and often horrifying special powers.

Saiga and Suitengu engage in a game of cat and mouse; Saiga and Kagura manage to evade capture several times before Suitengu himself attacks Saiga, severely injuring him, and takes Kagura captive. To take over Tennōzu Group, Suitengu murders its president, Shinsen Tennōzu, who also is Kagura's mother. Kagura inherits the group, so Suitengu attempts to marry her to take legal control of it. Saiga, having recovered from his wounds, interrupts the wedding and rescues Kagura. Together, they attempt to leave Japan but are enticed back by the prospect of defeating Suitengu once and for all.

The plan, however, ends up being a trap set up by Prime Minister Kamiya, Seiji Ochiai and other Cabinet members as a way to control Suitengu and take control over the club. But, Suitengu knew of their betrayal, and after trapping all the Cabinet members, the police superintendent and other members of government inside the club, he went to Kamiya's mansion to exact his revenge against him for having ruined his life and that of his family in the past. After brutally killing him, he then took away Kagura from Saiga by promising not to kill Saiga if Kagura comes with him willingly. Saiga and his policewoman friend Hibari Ginza make one final attack on Suitengu's stronghold - the main building of Tennōzu Group. In addition, a group of politicians from around the world fire missiles at Tokyo to kill Suitengu. Saiga and Suitengu battle, but Saiga is unable to defeat Suitengu before going blind from overusing his power. Suitengu spares Saiga's life, and, in a final act of defiance, self-destructs the Tennōzu building, killing all the members of the club and destroying all the money he gathered, before dying in the explosion. The world collapses into a financial crisis, but Saiga and Kagura finally reunite five years later, no longer under threat of attack.

== Production ==
Speed Grapher was aimed at a mature audience to "stimulate the audience at an intellectual level", according to director Kunihisa Sugishima. The story was influenced by the Japanese economic scenario in which there were several cases of suicides. He noted these cases must have been caused by the fact that in our society "financial fortune is equated with success and is expected to lead to happiness". He described Saiga as someone who opposes this system and Kagura as someone trapped on it. Gonzo opted to use little computer graphics and to create hand-drawn illustrations painted by computer for both the foreground and the background. In Sugishima's words: "Because we wanted Speed Grapher to stand out because of its story, we chose not to use any special visual effects."

== Media ==
=== Anime ===
The episodes of Speed Grapher are directed by Kunihisa Sugishima, animated by Gonzo, and produced by TV Asahi. They initially aired on TV Asahi between April 8, 2005, and September 30, 2005, in Japan. It was then released to twelve DVD compilations, each containing two episodes, between July 2005 and June 2006 by Sony Pictures Entertainment.

The North American adaptation was licensed to Funimation (later Crunchyroll, LLC), who released it to DVD and on iTunes. The six DVD compilations, containing four episodes each, were released to Region 1 between July 2006 and March 2007. Several "Limited Edition" DVDs were also released on the same dates as the regular DVDs. On March 11, 2008, a box set was released. Speed Grapher aired on the Independent Film Channel between March 7 and August 15, 2008. On September 28, 2006, Madman Entertainment revealed that it had received a license to distribute Speed Grapher to Australia and New Zealand. Madman released the first DVD volume with a collector's box on October 11, 2006. A box release, with all six DVD compilations, was released on March 19, 2008. In the United Kingdom, Speed Grapher was licensed to MVM Films, who released six DVD compilations between April 16, 2007, and February 4, 2008. Speed Grapher was also aired internationally by Animax. In Latin America, Animax aired the series in Brazil, Argentina, Venezuela, and Mexico. Future showings are also planned in Asia.

=== Manga ===
Based directly on the anime, a manga series, also entitled Speed Grapher, was released in Japan by MediaWorks and was originally serialized in Monthly Dengeki Comic GAO!. Illustrated by Tomozo, the series was collected into three tankōbon, which were released between September 2005 and September 2006.

The series was licensed to Chuang Yi in Singapore, who released all three volumes of the manga in English on December 11, 2007, July 22, 2008, and November 2009 respectively. Chuang Yi also released the series in Chinese. The Speed Grapher manga received another English release by Tokyopop in North America, who released the first two volumes on September 16, 2008, and December 2, 2008, respectively. The third volume was set to be released on March 10, 2009, but was cancelled shortly beforehand. In Germany, the manga was licensed to Carlson Comics, who released all three volumes. Titan Comics is set to re-release the manga in English in 2024.

=== Light novel ===
A light novel version of Speed Grapher, written by Minoru Niki, was also released. Hayakawa Publishing released it on July 21, 2005. The novel was also licensed to Tokyopop in North America and was set to be released on November 11, 2008, but was cancelled alongside volume three of the manga.

=== Music ===
A drama CD was released in Japan on September 22, 2005, by King Records. In addition, two soundtracks were released as bonus CDs accompanying the release of the second and the sixth DVD volume in August 2005 and February 2006, respectively. They include score music composed by Shinkichi Mitsumune, and the opening theme and the two ending themes.

== Reception ==
Speed Grapher received mixed reviews from critics. Zac Bertschy and Theron Martin of Anime News Network both found the animation to be sub-par when compared to other Gonzo releases. In addition, Zac found the storyline to be "totally silly" and strange though it was possibly very entertaining because of its uniqueness. Theron found that later episodes felt "more natural" and cited the characters to be part of this improvement, though the animation was "still second-class (at best)." Compared to the Japanese release, Theron Martin greatly preferred the English dubs, noting that "the English dialogue has more punch and better flow than the drier and sometimes awkwardly-worded Japanese." Tasha Robinson of Sci Fi Weekly found Speed Grapher to have a "rich feel that's mirrored in the lovely visuals" and a complicated storyline. She also commented that "Its dry, serious central plotline is also clearly aimed at viewers who value sophisticated, drawn-out serial stories over instant gratification." D. F. Smith of IGN disliked the storyline, though for different reasons. He felt that the series was "trying way too hard to push the content envelope" and that the characters were not likable. However, in contrast to the Anime News Network reviewers, he found the art and animation to be a "first-rate job." The anime was chosen as the fifth best DVD release of the year by DVD Talk's staff. They wrote, "the twists here were enough to make the series unique with a decidedly adult approach some may find discomforting but you will be glued to the edge of your seat as the action packed series provides some of the best intrigue of the year".
