= Sol Bianca =

1990–1991 anime

- 1990 VHS tape cover

ソルビアンカ (Sorubianka)
- Genre: Science fiction, adventure
- Original video animation
- Directed by: Katsuhito Akiyama (1); Hiroki Hayashi (2)
- Produced by: Tōru Miura; Masao Igarashi (1); Seirō Sakai (1); Akio Matsuda (2); Kunitoshi Shimura (2)
- Written by: Mayori Sekijima (1); Hidemi Kamada (2)
- Music by: Tōru Hirano (1); Tsunetoshi Kenjō (2)
- Studio: AIC
- Licensed by: NA: ADV Films
- Released: March 21, 1990 – May 17, 1991
- Runtime: 60 minutes (ep. 1); 40 minutes (ep. 2)
- Episodes: 2

Sol Bianca (ソルビアンカ, Sorubianka) is a two-volume Japanese OVA series released in 1990 and 1991. It was directed by Katsuhito Akiyama and Hiroki Hayashi in association with AIC. Sol Bianca: The Legacy is a six-episode OVA remake of this series.

The name of the OVA is also the name of the ship that serves as both the home and the interstellar headquarters for an all-female band of notorious pirates. Thanks to a stowaway who hides himself aboard their ship following one of their raids, they learn of the ultimate treasure: the Gnosis (pronounced "G'Nohsis" in dialogue), an artifact reputedly from old Earth itself. The Gnosis happens to be in the hands of Emperor Batros, the brutal ruler of the planet Tres (pronounced "trez" in dialogue) who is executing great numbers of enemies, real or speculated, as a result of his military occupation of the neighboring planet Uno. Armed with a little luck, a sniper gun that can shoot from orbit, and a technologically advanced ship, the crew of the Sol Bianca are about to make a run for the greatest prize of all.

== Characters ==
=== The Crew ===
- April Bikirk (Rei Sakuma/Kim Sevier): A skilled pilot and a crack shot, she is the first officer of the Sol Bianca. A headstrong and honorable individual, she will often fight to help others. April and Feb were the ones who discovered the Sol Bianca. April is thoughtful of her actions, but is also as impulsive as Janny when cornered. Most of the time she plays the mother and leader to the crew when Feb is not sober. She appears very protective of everyone on board. She wears a red battle armor. Her favorite weapon is usually a laser whip/knife or a pistol. In Sol Bianca: The Legacy she is the one who inherits the control pistol, recovered the ship and June. As the owner she is the captain.
- Feb Fall (Yōko Matsuoka/Laura Chapman): Captain of the Sol Bianca and oldest of the group. A woman of mystery, she is a calm and rational person, preferring to find a peaceful solution, but is capable in her own right. Feb is also cunning and a master at tactics and strategies. In Sol Bianca 2 it is revealed that she and April discovered the starship. She usually carries a short shotgun. She is also good with a sniper laser. She wears light gray armor. In Sol Bianca: The Legacy she is a lot more fond of drinking.
- Janny Mann (Minami Takayama/Sue Ulu): Heavy gunsmith with all sorts of weapons, she is a hot tempered, foul-mouthed young woman that is easily irritated by many people. She is familiar with any kind of weapons, armor suits and vehicles. Naturally, she usually directs the ship's weaponry on her bridge station, but she also can fly the ship when necessary. Most of her past is unknown but when June hacks into her diary in Sol Bianca 2, a few pictures of Janny's previous life are revealed. She wears slate-gray armor. She and June do not get along very well and are constantly bickering with each other. In the English dub she is called "Jenny".
- June Ashel (Yuriko Fuchizaki/Tiffany Grant): Hologram expert with computer skills, she is a selfish young teen who worries over her hair, and steals fancy dresses out of cargo containers. In Sol Bianca 2 it is revealed that June has an empathic link with the ship and its computer, even feeling its internal pain. Most of the time she drives the cargo truck that sucks up all the goodies they steal from cargo freighters or is called upon to infiltrate enemy computer systems. She has a sister like relationship with May. In Sol Bianca: The Legacy she is found inside the Sol Bianca by April. She is the last remaining member of the original crew. June has a strong connection to "G", the ship's artificially intelligent computer, and may even be a part of it in some way. She also has a holographic device that creates Sancho (who looks like a genie) that is linked to "G" and has the ability to access and manipulate other computer systems.
- May Jessica (Miki Itou/Kimberly Yates): The youngest member of the crew, she likes frilly clothes, and is the ship's genius chief engineer responsible for the ship's maintenance and repairs. She cares about all the members of the crew who are like family to her. Being so young and isolated, she sometimes views the world fairly simply, and seems to have crush on Rim. May usually hangs out with June. The two are often left in charge of the ship when the others are out. She pilots a powered and heavily armored battlesuit (apple-green and red), similar to a Landmate, for work. In Sol Bianca: The Legacy she is a stowaway on the ship. April decided to help her find her parents on Earth, only to find out from her uncle and aunt that May's parents have been killed by another group of pirates. She then decided to go with April and the others as a new and youngest crew member. On-board she attends a holographic simulated school life. She is usually lively, and somewhat immature person. She is often more preoccupied with having fun than with getting her homework done.

=== Sol Bianca (OVA 1) ===
- Rim Delapaz (Daisuke Namikawa/Jay Zeidman): The young boy who stows away aboard a cargo ship, in a shipping crate, and is found by the Sol Bianca crew. He asks the crew to help him get to the planet Tres. He uses the guise of the Gnosis, to convince the Sol Bianca crew to take him there, where he plans to rescue his mother.
- Dr. Delapaz (Tesshou Genda/John Swasey): Rim's father, he works with the leaders of the Uno Resistance.
- Emperor Batros (Takeshi Aono/Tristan MacAvery): The evil emperor of the planet Tres.

=== Sol Bianca 2 / OVA 2 ===
- Gomez (Daisuke Gori): Leader of the pirate gang the Sol Bianca crew encounters and makes a bad treatment to women.
- "Yuri Shuraba (Shuuichi Ikeda): A mysterious man who claims to be someone from Feb and April's past.

== Home video ==
Sol Bianca and Sol Bianca 2 were released on VHS in 1990 and 1991 respectively. A.D. Vision released a subtitled VHS of the first volume in April 1993. Sol Bianca 2 was released on VHS by A.D. Vision in 1995.

Sol Bianca 1 & 2 (subtitled) were released on DVD in the United Kingdom in 2000.

The laserdiscs included an additional 5.25" floppy disk with data files that officially came with them.

Sol Bianca is one of the rare cases where the first episode of the show had an English language dub made, but none was made for the second episode. This has been a reason stated by Matt Greenfield at numerous anime convention industry panels as to why a DVD release has never occurred.

== Video game ==
A single video game was released based on the series for the PC Engine CD-ROM² on June 29, 1990 by Nihon Computer System exclusively in Japan. A role-playing video game, it features the ship's crew from Sol Bianca and has seven episodes.

== Reception ==
Sol Bianca was voted best Best Subbed/Dubbed OAV at the 1993 Anime Expo.

Sol Bianca 3 was supposedly canceled due to low popularity in Japan.
