= List of Neon Genesis Evangelion characters =

The cast of Neon Genesis Evangelion as depicted on the Japanese "Genesis" (volume) 14 LaserDisc and VHS cover

The Japanese anime television series Neon Genesis Evangelion has an extensive cast of characters that were created by Gainax. The show's protagonist is Shinji Ikari, a teenage boy whose father Gendo recruits to the shadowy organization Nerv to pilot a giant, bio-machine mecha called an Evangelion and fight against beings called Angels.

The character designs were drawn by the artist, Yoshiyuki Sadamoto, who designed each character to be easily identifiable from their silhouette. The personalities were based on that of Hideaki Anno, the show's director and main scriptwriter. Many of the heroes in the second half of the series suffer trauma or physical violence that exacerbates their anxieties and fears, and the episodes give ample space to their inner monologues, in which they question the meaning of their actions and lives. This narrative choice culminates in the two final episodes, whose narrative pivots on Shinji's streams of consciousness; the finale, however, does not clearly conclude the plot.

In Japan, the characters received favorable audience reception, becoming the subjects of merchandise and winning popularity polls. Critics had mixed feelings about their psychological exploration; some reviewers appreciated their complexity and depth and praised Anno's script, but others found the characters to be stereotypical or problematic, and disliked the insistence on their weaknesses and characterization. The show's last two episodes proved to be controversial, since the plot is eclipsed by moments of introspection. Neon Genesis Evangelion characters, especially Rei Ayanami, also inspired later anime series, creating or helping to spread new stereotypes in Japanese animated productions.

== Conception ==
The studio Gainax studio chose interpersonal communication as the main theme of Neon Genesis Evangelion, insisting on portraying inter-generational relationships, such as those between parents and children. The studio wanted to create a series that reflects on the lack of communication in contemporaneous Japanese society, which was considered to be in ruins. As noted by writer Alexandre Marine, Gainax's movie Royal Space Force: The Wings of Honnêamise (1987) portrayed young people unable to integrate into society. The director of the series, Hideaki Anno, an otaku since his youth, experienced depression after the conclusion of his previous anime series, Nadia: The Secret of Blue Water, and poured his emotions into Neon Genesis Evangelion, making it a reflection of his feelings:

I tried to include everything of myself in Neon Genesis Evangelion – myself, a broken man who could do nothing for four years. A man who ran away for four years, one who was simply not dead. Then one thought. "You can't run away," came to me, and I restarted this production. It is a production where my only thought was to burn my feelings into film. I know my behavior was thoughtless, troublesome, and arrogant. But I tried. I don't know what the result will be. That is because within me, the story is not yet finished. I don't know what will happen to Shinji, Misato or Rei. I don't know where life will take them. Because I don't know where life is taking the staff of the production.

— Hideaki Anno

For each character, Anno took cues from a part of his personality, stating that: "All the characters of Evangelion are me". Shinji, for example, was conceived as a mirror of his self: "both the conscious and unconscious part". According to him, moreover, Kaworu Nagisa and Gendo Ikari represent his shadow, the dark, unconscious side of an individual's psyche. Kazuya Tsurumaki, assistant director of the series, stated that the autobiographical intent can also be detected in the female protagonists and secondary characters, such as Misato Katsuragi, Rei Ayanami, and Ryoji Kaji, saying, "Every character is ultimately the same. On the surface, different 'seasonings' have been used, but inside [the characters] are very similar". Anno also said Shinji and the other main characters are not to be considered only a mirror of his personal experience but a reflection of the other members of the series' creative staff as well. According to him, "It's strange that Evangelion has become such a hit – all the characters are so sick!"

Yoshiyuki Sadamoto's early draft for the character designs of the main characters

In 1993, about two years before the series aired, the production studio established a temporary lead on the creation of the characters in a presentation document titled New Century Evangelion (tentative name) Proposal (新世紀エヴァンゲリオン (仮) 企画書, Shinseiki Evangelion (kari) kikakusho; Proposal). Much of them were already outlined, despite differences in script. Anno did not follow a well-defined plan for the development of the protagonists; he improvised as the episodes passed and following his instincts, as in a "live performance". The original project also included a girl character named Yui Ichijō who was similar in appearance to Rei but had dark hair; this character never appeared in the final version of the show.

The blood type and date of birth of each character were almost always identical to those of the character's voice actor, the exceptions being Toji, Kensuke, Kaworu, and Rei, whose date is never explicitly revealed in the series. Anno named most of the characters after ships of the Imperial Japanese Navy in World War II, while others were taken from comic-book characters and the novel Ai to gensō no fascism (愛と幻想のファシズム; "The Fascism of Love and Fantasy") by Japanese writer Ryu Murakami, from which the names Toji Suzuhara and Kensuke Aida come. The show's character designer was Yoshiyuki Sadamoto, who had worked with Anno on Nadia; Sadamoto was asked to develop a design with a "relatively subdued appearance". Sadamoto gave the characters immediately distinguishable features and silhouettes, trying to reflect as much as possible the interior of each of them. Initially, Anno proposed using a female protagonist, following Gainax' earlier projects GunBuster and Nadia, but Sadamoto was hesitant about the idea, not understanding "why a girl would want to pilot a robot". Sadamoto suggested having a male protagonist, Shinji, and Asuka became the show's co-protagonist.

=== Development ===
Anno began working on Neon Genesis Evangelion with the idea the setting and characters would evolve as the story progressed. He continued to rely on his personal experience and avoided depicting "human dramas", perceiving the task as difficult; he thus preferred to represent Evangelion as a "documentary" rather than a drama. While working on the third and fourth episodes, he set the goal of surpassing other television series in development and psychological depth. The first episodes focus on Shinji's relationship problems and his constant attempts to approach Rei in "Rei I" and "Rei II". The creative staff felt dissatisfied with the result, considering it too heavy. To give a different impulse to the second part of the series the irreverent, exuberant character Asuka was inserted in the eighth episode, "Asuka Strikes!", which is the center of many comic and typically adolescent situations. In the following episodes, despite their communication difficulties, the show's protagonists are portrayed with the lightness typical of comedy following a conventional, science-fiction anime scheme. The episode's scriptwriter Shinji Higuchi, who is known for the humorous and lighthearted character of his works, intervened and the characters' development became more positive. In the following episodes, Misato opens up to Shinji and talk to him about her painful past; Asuka shows a sweeter and more-caring character, the cold commander Ikari helps his subordinates and praises his son.

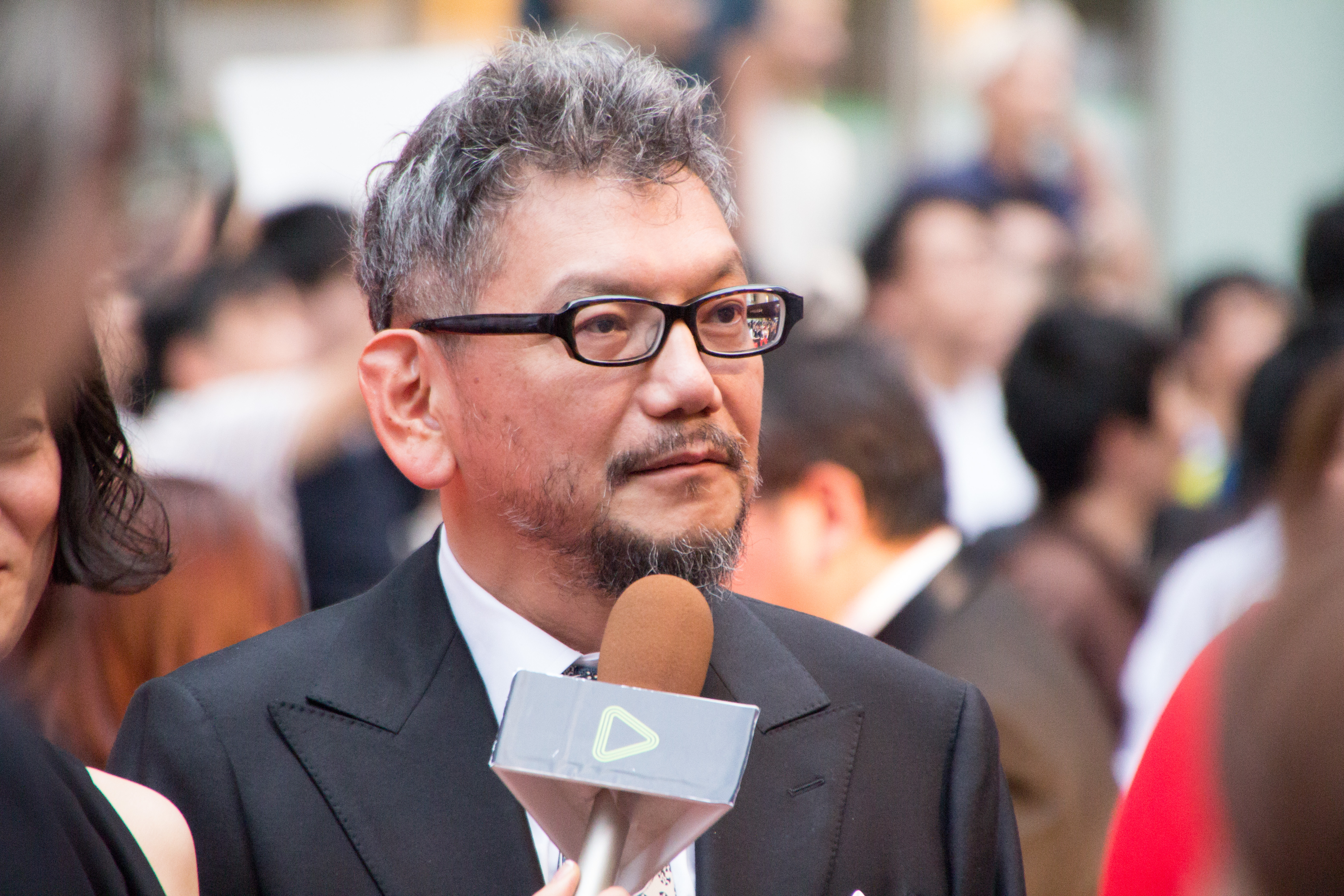
Neon Genesis Evangelion director Hideaki Anno

The last episodes would have closed the story and the protagonists' journey; for the ending the writers originally planned a scene in which Gendo would have said "Live!" (生きろ, Ikiro) to his son Shinji, similar to the ending of Gainax's earlier show The Secret of Blue Water, in which Captain Nemo utters the same phrase before sacrificing himself. During the first broadcast of the series, Anno responded to animation fans with anger, accusing them of being excessively closed and introverted; for this reason, he changed the atmosphere of the show's second half, making the narrative even darker and more introspective. This change of direction is reflected in the protagonists' development. While being criticized, Anno decided to make the characters Asuka and Toji undergo physical and psychological violence, which was considered unsuitable for a television show in a protected transmission time.

According to Michael House, native English translator for Gainax, at the beginning Anno had the idea of ending the anime with a scene of Shinji smiling and with the full maturation of the characters, who would be able to establish healthier relationships, but towards the middle of the show, he realized this could not be done in a credible way. Anno would have failed in his intent, creating characters who were too closed and problematic. Asuka, for example, was initially inserted to lighten the tone of the series, and only as the show progressed it was decided to pay attention to her inner fragility. At the same time, breaking a taboo of Japanese television, Anno focused on the sexuality of the protagonists, inserting in the twentieth episode a sequence of implicit sex that includes a long, off-screen shot of Misato making sounds of pleasure in bed with her lover Kaji. The director said he wanted to show the audience, and especially children, how sex and violence are an integral part of human life.

In the show's fourteenth episode, Anno wanted to investigate Rei Ayanami, whom he felt he had not adequately explored and with whom he felt less affinity than the other characters. Running out of ideas, an acquaintance of Anno lent him a book on mental illness. Since then, Anno tried to include more concepts from psychology and psychoanalysis into the show. The show's main theme thus became the deepening of the human inner lives and reflections on interpersonal communication are depicted through streams of consciousness of the protagonists. Shinji's character was deepened through internal monologues, as in the sixteenth and twentieth episodes. The last episodes also suffered from the tight production schedule; they were made in a short time to meet the deadlines. In the twenty-fifth episode, the protagonists undergo a psychoanalysis session in a dark theater, retracing their childhoods through flashbacks. By rewriting the script, Anno focused only on the psychology of the main characters with a special focus on Shinji, completely abandoning the main plot and not offering a clear conclusion to the anime's narrative. He tried to deliver a message to and criticism of the otaku world and himself, as a long-time otaku.

== Pilots ==
In the Japanese dialogue for the original anime, the Eva pilots are referred to as "children", even when referring to an individual pilot. The English translation refers to the individual pilots as First Child, etc. In Rebuild of Evangelion, the expression "(n)th Children" is not used; instead, the pilots are referred to as Ichibanme no tekikakusha (一番目の適格者, "The First Qualified Person/Candidate"), Dai Ichi no Shōjo (第一の少女, "First Girl"), Sanninme no kodomo (三人目の子供, "Third Child"), or Dai San no Shōnen (第三の少年, "Third Boy").

=== Shinji Ikari ===
Voiced by: Megumi Ogata, Ryūnosuke Kamiki (adult) (Japanese); Spike Spencer (ADV, Movies and Rebuild), Casey Mongillo (Netflix) (English)

Shinji Ikari (碇 シンジ, Ikari Shinji) is the only son of Gendo Rokubungi and Yui Ikari. Following the early death of his mother, who disappeared in a mysterious accident, his father entrusted Shinji to a guardian. Once Shinji turns fourteen, Gendo calls him back to the city of Tokyo-3 to assume the role of the Third Child, a pilot assigned to command Eva-01. Because of his abandonment, Shinji feels unwanted and, according to Hideaki Anno, "abandoned the attempt to understand himself", convincing himself he is useless. Anno also described him as shy of human contact and unable to commit suicide. Compared to the stereotypical heroes of traditional mecha anime, he is devoid of energy, withdrawn, and pessimistic. After moving to Tokyo-3, Shinji begins to form relationships that influence him positively, especially with other pilots, his classmates, and members of Nerv, such as Misato Katsuragi, his superior and legal guardian, and Ryoji Kaji.

While writing Shinji, the show's writers used psychological concepts such as Freudian theories of the oral stage, the porcupine's dilemma, and the splitting of the breast. His characterization has been compared to that of Amuro Ray, the protagonist of Mobile Suit Gundam, and Japanese otaku. Anime critics associated the character with the youth and climate of 1990s Japan, which was impacted by the Tokyo subway sarin attack, the Great Hanshin earthquake, and the bursting of the Japanese asset price bubble, and interpreted him as a messianic figure.

Unreality Magazine's Nick Verboon described Shinji as "one of the most nuanced, popular, and relatable characters in anime history". Anime and manga publications gave Shinji a mixed reception. Comic Book Resources' Angelo Delos Trinos wrote, "No anime character inspires as many polarized takes as Shinji". Although his complexity was praised and generally considered realistic, his insecurity and weakness were criticized. Shinji's characterization in the spin-offs and the Rebuild of Evangelion films, however, was positively received because of his more self-confident personality and the optimistic tone of his development.

=== Asuka Langley Soryu ===
Voiced by: Yūko Miyamura (Japanese); Tiffany Grant (ADV, Movies and Rebuild), Stephanie McKeon (Netflix) (English)

Asuka Langley Soryu (惣流・アスカ・ラングレー, Sōryū Asuka Rangurē; IPA: [soːɾʲɯː asɯ̥ka ɾaŋɡɯɾeː]) is a fiery pilot who is assigned to command Evangelion Unit 02 as the Second Child. She is a red-haired, blue-eyed, German-Japanese-American girl who was raised and educated in Germany. Asuka is a child prodigy who graduated from college at a young age; she is brave, positive, and enthusiastic about her role as a pilot, but has a pronounced inferiority complex towards males. Asuka appears to be authoritarian towards recent acquaintances. Although she has a natural spontaneity, she suffers from mental problems, which alongside her excessive self-love, causes her to be unable to pilot her Evangelion in the series' second half. Asuka is attracted to her colleague Shinji Ikari, but over time she starts to develop ambivalent feelings towards him. In the anime's final episodes, Asuka develops a deep self-loathing and begins to feel anxiety at the idea of being alone, in a framework similar to separation anxiety disorder. In the Rebuild of Evangelion tetralogy, Asuka is renamed to Asuka Langley Shikinami and given the rank of Captain in the European Air Force.

Critics and official publications about the series have linked Asuka to psychological disorders and defense mechanisms such as masculine protest, reaction formation, repression, and narcissistic personality disorder. She maintained a high ranking in every popularity poll of the series and has appeared in surveys of the most-popular anime characters in Japan. Despite this, Asuka received mixed reception. Some critics took issue with her hubris and her personality, judging these as tiresome and arrogant; others appreciated her realism and complex psychological introspection.

=== Rei Ayanami ===
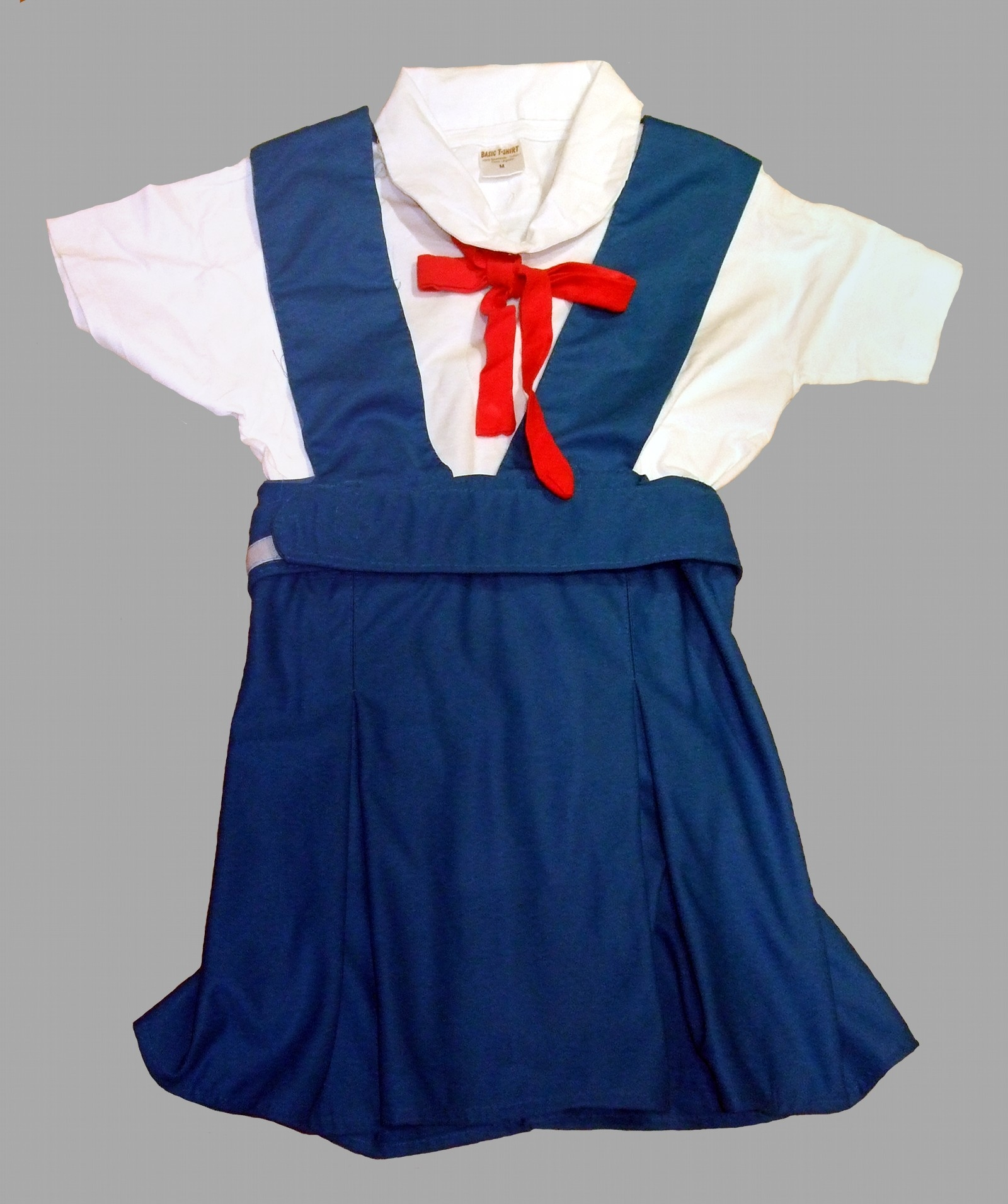
Reproduction of the school uniform worn by the female students of the first municipal middle school of Tokyo-3

Voiced by: Megumi Hayashibara (Japanese); Amanda Winn-Lee (ADV, Movies and Amazon Prime Video Rebuild), Brina Palencia (Funimation Rebuild), Ryan Bartley (Netflix) (English)

Rei Ayanami (綾波 レイ, Ayanami Rei) is a pilot assigned to command Evangelion Unit 00 as the First Child. Her date of birth is unknown. Rei is a taciturn, shy girl who mechanically carries out orders from her superiors, even if they are cruel. She is committed to fighting against the Angels, as if it is the only connection between her and other people and her reason for living. Rei minimizes contact with others; the only exception being Gendo Ikari, to whom she is more open. Rei is a clone created from the genes of Yui Ikari, Gendo's wife; every time Rei dies, she is replaced by a new clone, and she is aware of being replaceable. As the show progresses, Rei slowly befriends Shinji, her colleague at Nerv and classmate, discovering human emotions and acquiring greater self-awareness.

According to Winn-Lee, behind Rei's cold and aloof appearance is a "small spark of humanity" that is overshadowed by her low self-esteem; Winn-Lee also said Rei "knows she's expendable, but the thing is, she's still human". Critics have compared Rei to the Virgin Mary, Pinocchio, and a "Great Bad Mother trying to take in her son". Anno originally conceived of Rei as a representation of his unconscious mind and a young, female schizophrenia sufferer. He asked Sadamoto to give Rei the likeness of "a bitterly unhappy young girl with little sense of presence". Sadamoto also took inspiration from Paul Gallico's novella The Snow Goose. Writer Patrick W. Galbraith described Rei as "the single most popular and influential character in the history of otaku anime". Rei has received a positive reception, and has appeared in popularity polls about the best anime characters decades after the show's first broadcast. Her role in Rebuild was especially appreciated; reviewers praised her development and gradual process of gaining self-awareness.

=== Toji Suzuhara ===
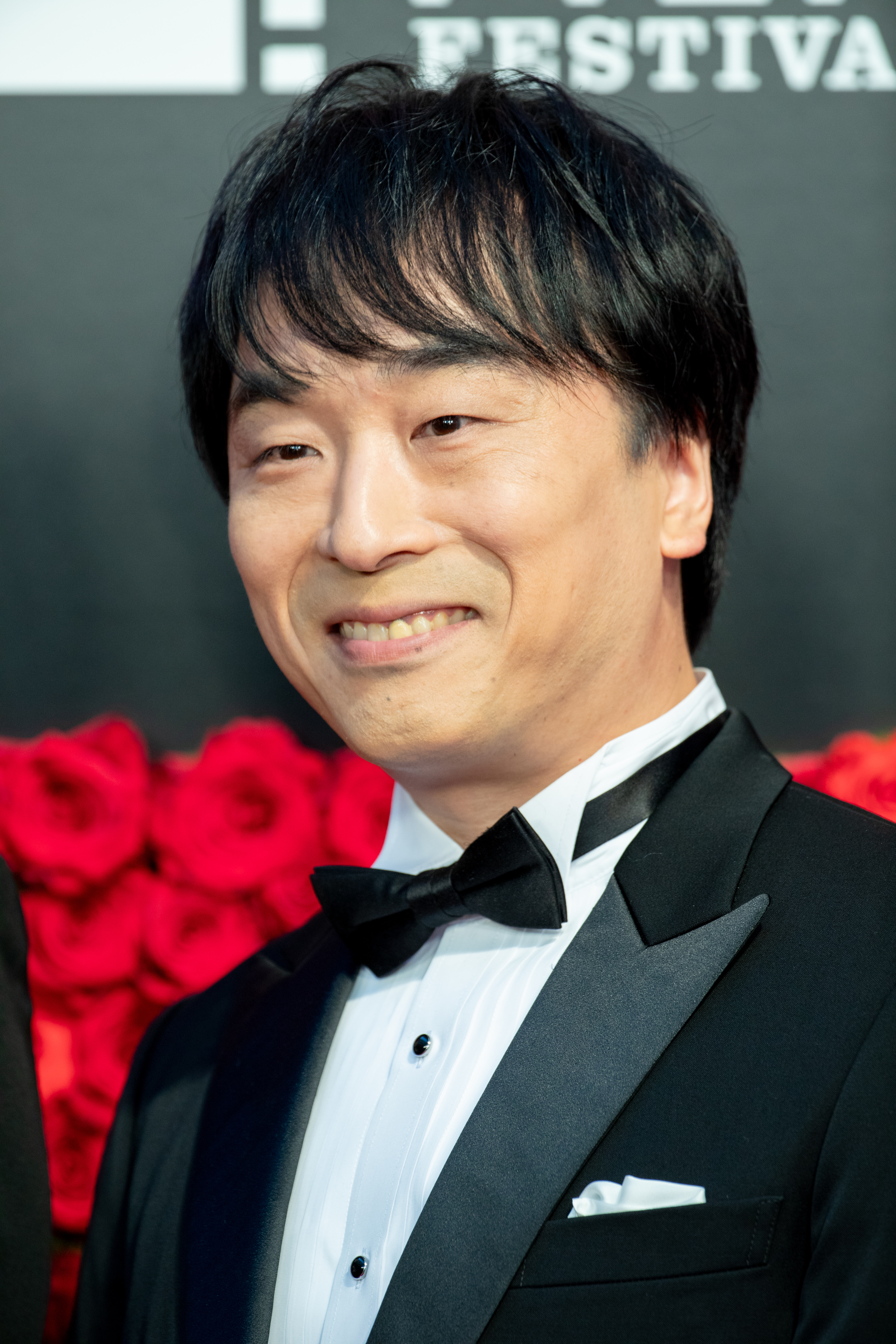
Tomokazu Seki voiced Toji in Japanese.

Voiced by: Tomokazu Seki (Japanese); Joe Pisano (ADV, episodes 3–18), Michael O'Connor (ADV, episodes 19 and 20), Brett Weaver (ADV, episode 26, films and Amazon Prime Video Rebuild), Justin Cook (Funimation Rebuild), Johnny Yong Bosch (Netflix) (English)

Toji Suzuhara (鈴原 トウジ, Suzuhara Tōji) is a student of class 2-A at the first municipal middle school in Tokyo-3. At first, he shows strong animosity towards Shinji, holding him responsible for an accident that affected his younger sister during the clash between the third Angel, Sachiel, and Unit 01; in the third episode, he assaults Shinji before the arrival of the fourth Angel, Shamshel. However, after witnessing the fight, Toji feels guilt for his actions and becomes concerned about Shinji, despite pride that prevents him from openly showing his feelings. Toji considers himself to be a tough guy and projects a strong character, but hides an honest, kind, and introverted side. His humane approach and expansive character have a positive influence on Ikari and the other Children. In the series' second half, Toji is chosen as the Fourth Child, the qualified subject and pilot assigned to command Eva-03. Toji accepts the task assigned to him on the condition his sister is transferred to the hospital at Nerv's headquarters. However, during its activation experiment, the Angel Bardiel infects Unit 03, who goes out of control and clashes with and defeats 02 and 00; it then engages in a hand-to-hand fight with 01 that causes its destruction. Toji survives, but loses his left leg. In the manga adaptation, Toji is killed instead of being injured. In the Rebuild films, Asuka test pilots Unit-03 instead of Toji. As shown in the final installment, he marries Hikari and has a child with her.

=== Kaworu Nagisa ===
Voiced by: Akira Ishida (Japanese); Kyle Sturdivant (ADV), Aaron Krohn (films), Greg Ayres (Director's Cut), Jerry Jewell (Funimation Rebuild), Clifford Chapin (Netflix), Daman Mills (Amazon Prime Video Rebuild) (English)

Kaworu Nagisa (渚 カヲル, Nagisa Kaoru) is the Fifth Child, who is sent to Nerv as a replacement pilot for Unit 02 following Asuka's psychological breakdown. Kaworu befriends Shinji Ikari, towards whom he has a sincere and unconditional affection, and then reveals himself as the seventeenth and final Angel Tabris. Kaworu infiltrates Nerv's headquarters in an attempt to reunite with the first Angel Adam, but after discovering that the second Angel Lilith is locked in the Terminal Dogma, he asks Shinji to kill him. Kaworu was born on September 13, 2000, the same day as the Second Impact.

Critics have compared Kaworu to Jesus Christ for his sacrifice, Devilman's Ryo Asuka, and Kaoru, a character from the science-fiction movie Summer Vacation 1999 (1988). Evangelion Chronicle magazine linked his name to Tabris, the Angel of free will, and Cahor (Japanese: Kahoru (カホル)), who is referred to as the Angel of deceit, a detail the publication relates to his deceptive, anthropomorphic features. Gainax originally conceived Kaworu as a cat that controls a boy, intended to appear in the series' twenty-second episode. Although Kaworu only appears in one episode, he remains popular with audiences and animation enthusiasts, and topped popularity polls. Anime News Network's Kenneth Lee disliked Kaworu's ambiguity and lack of clarity, and the homoerotic undertones of his relationship with Shinji; others reviewers praised it and enjoyed his personality. Kaworu's role in the film Evangelion 3.0 (2012) also drew positive comments from critics.

=== Mari Illustrious Makinami ===
Voiced by: Maaya Sakamoto (Japanese); Trina Nishimura (Funimation), Deneen Melody (Amazon Prime Video) (English)

Mari Illustrious Makinami (真希波・マリ・イラストリアス, Makinami Mari Irasutoriasu) is introduced in the film Evangelion: 2.0 You Can (Not) Advance (2009), the second installment of the Rebuild of Evangelion tetralogy. Mari is originally from England and is a pilot for Nerv's European branch. In her first appearance, Mari is assigned to Evangelion Unit 05 and fights aboard Asuka's Eva-02. Mari was created at the request of Toshimichi Ōtsuki, the original series' producer, to introduce a new female character for the Rebuild series and attract new audiences. Anno decided not to meddle in the creation of Mari to avoid replicating the other main characters. He entrusted Mari's development to Kazuya Tsurumaki, a member of Khara. Mari's concept went through numerous revisions because neither Anno nor the other writers knew what kind of female hero they wanted to create, and were undecided until the deadline. Mari's character design was entrusted to Sadamoto, who wanted to differentiate her from other Evangelion protagonists, and took inspiration from various sources, including Space Battleship Yamato, UFO, and a character played by Yui Aragaki in My Boss My Hero (2006).

Mari received mixed reception from critics. Some reviewers thought she was excessively sexualized, and considered her role irrelevant and insignificant; others praised it, finding her a good alternative to the other characters. In Evangelion: 3.0+1.0 Thrice Upon a Time, Mari's character was deepened with additional details, which drew attention and further mixed evaluations; several critics complained about the lack of explanations about her nature, finding her underdeveloped and wasted; others appreciated her battle scenes, her psychology, and her role in the show's finale.

== Supporting characters ==
=== Nerv staff ===
==== Gendo Ikari ====
Voiced by: Fumihiko Tachiki (Japanese); Tristan MacAvery (ADV and films), John Swasey (Director's Cut and Rebuild), Ray Chase (Netflix) (English)

Gendo Ikari (碇 ゲンドウ, Ikari Gendō) is Nerv's supreme commander, husband of Yui Ikari, and father of Shinji, with whom he has a difficult relationship. Gendo conducts the Adam Project and the Human Instrumentality Project. He has cold, pragmatic, and calculating mannerisms, displaying a distant attitude toward his subordinates; only Fuyutsuki seems to understand his thoughts. Gendo's attitude leads him to use any means necessary to achieve his personal goals, embarking on romantic and sexual relationships with Dr. Naoko Akagi and her daughter Ritsuko. Gendo leads the Instrumentality Project in hopes of reuniting with his wife Yui, who died in a mysterious accident years ago. Gendo is also the main antagonist of Rebuild of Evangelion, and in particular Evangelion: 3.0+1.0 Thrice Upon a Time (2021).

The character was originally conceived as a modern version of Victor Frankenstein; he was inspired by the personal experiences of the series' staff members, reflecting the absent and emotionally detached Japanese father figure. Neon Genesis Evangelion director Hideaki Anno's father was also an influence on Gendo; Anno also took inspiration from psychoanalysis concepts, especially the Freudian Oedipus complex. Gendo ranked in several polls about the most attractive male characters, but reviewers also had negative opinions of him; they criticized his abusive and manipulative ways. Gendo's role in Rebuild has been more positively received, especially in the final installment. His image has also been described as "one of the most easily recognizable images of anime on the internet"; his joined-hands pose, which fans named the Gendo pose, has been parodied in subsequent anime and manga.

==== Misato Katsuragi ====
Voiced by: Kotono Mitsuishi (Japanese); Allison Keith (ADV, Movies and Rebuild), Carrie Keranen (Netflix) (English)

Misato Katsuragi (葛城 ミサト, Katsuragi Misato) is the captain of the Nerv Operations Department and Shinji's guardian. Due to her childhood trauma, she has developed a frivolous, exuberant, and extroverted personality and leads a sloppy, messy lifestyle. Misato's affectionate personality sometimes causes her to prioritize her human feelings over her duty as a Nerv employee, and her job provokes internal conflict and causes her to make difficult choices. In the Rebuild saga, Misato is the captain of Wille, an organization created to destroy Nerv.

For the character, the staff took inspiration from Fujiko Mine of Lupin III, Japanese writer Aya Sugimoto, and Usagi Tsukino of Sailor Moon, with whom she shares a voice actor. Mitsuishi described Misato as a lonely, insecure woman who tries to hide "the darkness and loneliness she harbors deep in her heart". Writer Dennis Redmond speculated that Misato may be based on Nadia Arwol from The Secret of Blue Water, while Akio Nagatomi of The Animé Café compared her to Kazumi Amano from Gunbuster. Misato has ranked high in popularity polls and has generally had a positive reception. Reviewers appreciated her tenacity, endearment, and psychology; deeming her realistic and underrated.

==== Kozo Fuyutsuki ====
Voiced by: Motomu Kiyokawa (Japanese); Guil Lunde (ADV), Michael Ross (films, Amazon Prime Video Rebuild), Kent Williams (Funimation Rebuild), J. P. Karliak (Netflix) (English)

Kozo Fuyutsuki (冬月 コウゾウ, Fuyutsuki Kōzō) is Nerv's deputy commander. After obtaining a professorship as a teacher of metaphysical biology at Kyoto University, in 1999 he met Yui Ikari, a promising student at the same institute. Around this time, he met Yui's boyfriend Gendo, of whom he was immediately suspicious. After the Second Impact, the United Nations called upon Kozo to conduct a formal investigation into the event. Kozo met Gendo again, reinforcing his suspicions about him. Kozo began to think that he and a mysterious organization named Seele may be responsible for the catastrophe and the deaths of billions of people. In 2003, Kozo continued to independently investigate the matter; having arrived at the Artificial Evolution Laboratory, he threatened to publicly disclose the truth he discovered, but Gendo led him to Central Dogma, where he met Dr. Naoko Akagi and learned of Gehirn, the association in which they both secretly operate. Gendo asked Kozo to collaborate with him to build the new history of mankind; for unknown reasons, Kozo accepted and later became Gendo's close associate.

Although Kozo shares Nerv's basic objectives, he occasionally shows he does not approve of its means. He has a balanced character and does not panic in dramatic situations. Despite his role as a deputy, he maintains an affectionate personality and a humane approach to his subordinates, including the pilots. In The End of Evangelion, a vision of Yui Ikari appears to Kozo during Instrumentality and he smiles to welcome her; he serenely watches the process while waiting to reunite with the woman he never stopped loving. Kozo's last name Fuyutsuki comes from the Akizuki-class destroyer of the same name. According to Yoshiyuki Sadamoto, Gendo and Kozo are respectively based on Ed Straker and Alec Freeman from the television series UFO. In animator Mitsuo Iso's initial proposals, Fuyutsuki was supposed to at some point acquire eyes like Rei's in an accident and become Gendo's antagonist.

==== Ritsuko Akagi ====
Voiced by: Yuriko Yamaguchi (Japanese); Sue Ulu (ADV and films), Colleen Clinkenbeard (Funimation Rebuild), Erica Lindbeck (Netflix), Mary Faber (Amazon Prime Video Rebuild) (English)

Ritsuko Akagi (赤木 リツコ, Akagi Ritsuko) is the head of the first section of the technology department at Nerv's headquarters, and one of the main developers of the Evangelion units. In 2005, during college, Ritsuko met and befriended Misato Katsuragi, as well as her boyfriend Kaji, whom Ritsuko considered annoying. In 2008, after completing her studies at Tokyo-2, Ritsuko joined Gehirn Research Center as the head of Project E. Following her transfer to the special agency Nerv, Ritsuko became responsible for the management of the Magi supercomputer. At Nerv, Ritsuko comes into close contact with her mother's lover Gendo Ikari, learning secret information that is withheld from almost all other members of the organization.

Ritsuko is rational, and has a strong sense of discipline and detached judgment. She finds it difficult to reconcile these sides of her character, which are often a source of violent, emotional contrasts. Ritsuko shows great determination and indifference, and hesitates to talk about herself, even with longtime friends, which ultimately fractures her friendship with Misato by the end of the series. Despite her rational and reserved exterior, she is sensitive, expressive, and passionate. At the beginning of her university career, Ritsuko dyed her hair blonde to differentiate herself from her mother Naoko. She later fell in love with Gendo Ikari, with whom she entered a secret romantic relationship and offered him her scientific skills and body. Ritsuko is jealous of Rei, the center of Gendo's attention, and feeling used and betrayed, she carries out reckless acts of revenge against him. In The End of Evangelion, Ritsuko is no longer able to manage her feelings of love and hate; she attempts to destroy Nerv's headquarters, uttering the phrase "Mom, do you want to die with me?". However, the Casper computer, in which Naoko's personality is imprinted, refuses the command to self-destruct, and Gendo shoots Ritsuko dead. Newtype magazine compared Ritsuko to previous Anno characters, such as Kazumi Amano from Gunbuster and Electra from Nadia.

==== Ryoji Kaji ====
Voiced by: Kōichi Yamadera (Japanese); Aaron Krohn (ADV and films), J. Michael Tatum (Funimation Rebuild), Greg Chun (Netflix), Sean Burgos (Amazon Prime Video Rebuild) (English)

Ryoji Kaji (加持 リョウジ, Kaji Ryōji) is a member of Nerv's Special Investigations Department. During college, he met Misato Katsuragi and Ritsuko Akagi. He later enters into a romantic relationship and cohabitation with Misato, which was broken off two years later. When Ryoji joined Nerv, he was transferred to Germany and appointed as Asuka's guardian. In 2015, he traveled with Asuka to Japan and met his former university friends. During the trip, he secretly carried the embryo of Adam, the first Angel, and delivered it to Gendo Ikari. For Gendo, Ryoji sabotages the Jet Alone, a robot built by Nerv's rival chemical industry community. Ryoji works at the Investigations Department of the Japanese Government Ministry of Internal Affairs and is also assigned by Seele to monitor Gendo Ikari. Ryoji is a spy under the pay of three organizations, which Gendo is aware of, but he seems to benefit the most from his presence.

Although the motive for Ryoji's actions remains unknown, he tries to find the truth about Nerv's real objectives. After the battle against the Angel Zeruel, one of Ryoji's informants betrays him and a third man assassinates him. Ryoji bequeaths the results of his investigations to Misato. Some fan theories about the identity of his murderer arose; starting from the twentieth episode, many fans thought Misato, who takes a gun in the scene before his murder, is responsible, but the main staff falsified this theory, saying the responsible party would be found among the members of Seele or the secret services. To avoid misunderstanding, some scenes of the director's cut version of the series were changed. The character was inspired by Captain Foster from the television series UFO.

==== Makoto Hyuga ====
Voiced by: Hiro Yūki (Japanese); Matt Greenfield (ADV), Keith Burgess (films), Mike McFarland (Funimation Rebuild), Daniel MK Cohen (Netflix), Joe Fria (Amazon Prime Video Rebuild) (English)

Makoto Hyuga (日向 マコト, Hyūga Makoto) is one of Nerv's main operators who, from the command bridge, follows and controls all operations of the Eva units. He assists Major Misato Katsuragi in the strategic planning of the battles against the Angels. Makoto has a friendly, kind, and compassionate nature but he speaks his mind and is not intimidated, even in front of his superiors. Compared to his colleagues, Makoto is more confident with Katsuragi, due to his skills and ability to gather secret information. On some occasions, Makoto acts rashly and seems to have feelings for Misato. Although Makoto is aware of his feelings, which are not reciprocated, he continues to assist Misato and launches into dangerous situations to help her. In The End of Evangelion, Misato appears to him during Instrumentality, and a mixed expression of terror and pleasure is visible on his face. His last name is derived from the Imperial Japanese Navy battleship of the same name. Hideaki Anno said he does not remember why he named the character Makoto, but says a possible influence may have been the novel Shinsengumi Keppuroku by Ryōtarō Shiba.

==== Maya Ibuki ====
Voiced by: Miki Nagasawa (Japanese); Kendra Benham (ADV), Amy Seeley (films, Amazon Prime Video Rebuild), Monica Rial (Director's Cut), Caitlin Glass (Funimation Rebuild), Christine Marie Cabanos (Netflix) (English)

Maya Ibuki (伊吹 マヤ, Ibuki Maya) is one of the three main technical operators in the Operational Command Center at Nerv's headquarters. Her main task is to report the synchronicity rate of the pilots. Being directly involved in Project E, Maya is subordinate to Dr. Ritsuko Akagi, for whom she feels a sense of veneration as she faithfully carries out her directives. Although she is a diligent and competent assistant, she is emotionally immature, and Ritsuko accuses her of excessive idealism. Maya's scrupulous character makes her feel aversion to the Dummy System, which she considers to be inhuman. During bloody wartime confrontations, Maya feels revulsion or vomits. Over the course of the series, it is implied that Maya gradually develops feelings beyond professional respect for her senpai which turns into sapphic love. For the names Maya and Ibuki, Anno took inspiration from two cruisers of the Imperial Japanese Navy and a commander in the series Return of Ultraman.

==== Shigeru Aoba ====
Voiced by: Takehito Koyasu (Japanese); Jason C. Lee (ADV and films, Amazon Prime Video Rebuild), Vic Mignogna (Director's Cut), Phil Parsons (Funimation Rebuild), Billy Kametz (Netflix) (English)

Shigeru Aoba (青葉 シゲル, Aoba Shigeru) is, along with Makoto Hyuga and Maya Ibuki, one of the technical operators of the Operations Command Center at Nerv's headquarters. Shigeru is realistic, serious, professional, and emotionally detached. He keeps his life and private life private and does not socialize much with his colleagues, although he has good relations with them. At work, Shigeru is calm and calculating. Shigeru is a big fan of music and plays guitar. In The End of Evangelion, during Instrumentality, Shigeru is terrified at the sight of Rei Ayanami's clones. As his colleagues transform into LCL, an expression of terror is visible on his face, and Rei does not take on the appearance of any of his loved ones; according to the book The Essential Evangelion Chronicle, this is because he "has never loved another person". His last name is derived from the Japanese Imperial Navy cruiser of the same name; the name Shigeru was chosen to create a pun with Aoba Shigereru, a 1974 Japanese film that was directed by Kihachi Okamoto.

=== Classmates ===
==== Kensuke Aida ====
Voiced by: Tetsuya Iwanaga (Japanese); Kurt Stoll (ADV and films), Greg Ayres (Funimation Rebuild), Benjamin Diskin (Netflix), Alejandro Saab (Amazon Prime Video Rebuild) (English)

Kensuke Aida (相田 ケンスケ, Aida Kensuke) is a student in class 2-A of the first municipal middle school in Tokyo-3. Kensuke has strong dialectical skills, is a fan of military life, and often plays survivor games when he is alone in the countryside. Like his classmates Shinji Ikari, Toji Suzuhara, Rei Ayanami, and Hikari Horaki, Kensuke is motherless. Some dialogue in the seventeenth episode suggests that his father is part of the Nerv administration, either in its research department or general affairs division. Along with the rest of the school, he moves to another place after Tokyo-3 is destroyed.

==== Hikari Horaki ====
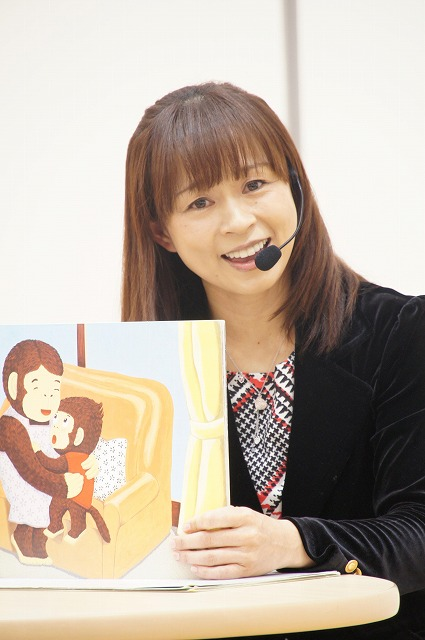
Junko Iwao voiced Hikari in Japanese.

Voiced by: Junko Iwao (Japanese); Carol Amerson (ADV), Kimberly Yates (films, Amazon Prime Video Rebuild), Leah Clark (Funimation Rebuild), Abby Trott (Netflix) (English)

Hikari Horaki (洞木 ヒカリ, Horaki Hikari) is the head of class 2-A at Tokyo-3 Municipal Middle School. She has an older sister named Kodama and a younger sister named Nozomi. Hikari is grumpy, rigid, and rule-abiding but hides a sweet, patient side; she is caring and attentive to the needs of her sisters and friends. Hikari constantly taunts and reprimands her partner Toji Suzuhara, likely to repress her feelings of love towards him. Among the girls of 2-A, Hikari is the only one who can approach Asuka. In the series' final episodes, Hikari's companion goes through an emotional breakdown and Hikari remains close to her, hosting Asuka in her house, and showing her sincere and unconditional affection until the end. For the character's surname, Anno took inspiration from Ryū Murakami's novel Ai to gensō no fascism; the names of her sisters, Kodama and Nozomi, are taken from high-speed trains of the Tokaido Shinkansen line.

=== Other characters ===
==== Naoko Akagi ====
Voiced by: Mika Doi (Japanese); Laura Chapman (ADV and films) (English)

Naoko Akagi (赤木 ナオコ, Akagi Naoko) is the mother and colleague of Dr. Ritsuko Akagi. Naoko is a world-renowned scientist and a member of the Gehirn Research Center, and knows the truth about Second Impact and the Eva creation project. Naoko embarked on a secret relationship with Gendo, Gehirn's commander-in-chief, while he was married to Yui. In 2008, Naoko completed the fundamental theory of the Magi System supercomputer, which was completed two years later. In the three Magi biocomputers she developed, she digitally transcribed the main aspects of her personality; as a woman, as a scientist, and as a mother. Naoko later realized that Gendo was exploiting her for her talent as a scientist and researcher. but ignored the truth and continued the relationship. In 2010, Gendo arrived at the base with a child named Rei Ayanami, who resembles Yui. On the evening of her visit, Rei gets lost in Gehirn's control room and runs into Naoko, whom she calls an "old hag", which Gendo also called her. Naoko recognizes Yui's features in Rei's face, and in a fit of rage, she strangles Rei and then commits suicide by crashing into the Caspar computer. For the character's name, Hideaki Anno took inspiration from an old elementary-school company of his.

==== Yui Ikari ====
Voiced by: Megumi Hayashibara (Japanese); Kim Sevier (ADV), Amanda Winn-Lee (films, Amazon Prime Video Rebuild), Stephanie Young (Funimation Rebuild), Ryan Bartley (Netflix) (English)

Yui Ikari (碇 ユイ, Ikari Yui) is Shinji's mother and Gendo's wife. In 1999, when she was a student at Kyoto University, she met Professor Fuyutsuki and discussed research on artificial evolution with him. Later that year, she became romantically involved with Gendo, whom she married, to Fuyutsuki's disappointment. Later, Yui works with her husband at the Laboratory for Artificial Evolution. In 2004, at the age of twenty-seven, Yui willingly proposed herself as a subject in an experimental activation of Unit 01. During the test, Yui was killed in front of Gendo, the other members of the laboratory, and her son Shinji. Yui was absorbed by the humanoid and her body disappeared. Attempts to recover her were unsuccessful, and the case was dismissed as an accident but became public knowledge. In the series' final episodes and in The End of Evangelion, however, it is revealed that the accident was the result of Yui's deliberate choice. Her soul is kept inside the unit, and she is occasionally able to aid Shinji by controlling its movements. In The End of Evangelion, Yui's spirit gives Shinji the courage to choose his future and that of humanity, rejecting Instrumentality. Hideaki Anno chose the name Yui because it is similar to Rei's name; while Rei (零) means "zero" or "nothingness", Yui (唯) can be translated as "only one".

==== Kyoko Zeppelin Soryu ====
Voiced by: Maria Kawamura (Japanese); Yvonne Aguirre (ADV), Kimberly Yates (films) (English)

Kyoko Zeppelin Soryu (惣流・キョウコ・ツェッペリン, Sōryū Kyōko Tsepperin) is the mother of Asuka Langley Soryu. Kyoko was born in 1974 and worked for the German division of the Gehirn Research Center, which eventually became Nerv. In 2005, Kyoko was subjected to a contact experiment with Unit 02, which she had promoted the construction of. During the test, she suffered mental contamination and was psychologically damaged. After being hospitalized, Kyoko became unable to recognize Asuka and spoke to a cloth doll who she believed to be her daughter. In the meantime, Kyoko's husband begins an affair with another scientist. Shortly afterward, Asuka is chosen as the Second Child and pilot of Unit 02; Asuka, believing the event could induce her mother to recognize her again, runs to Kyoko's hospital room, only to find her body hanging from the ceiling. It is assumed that a part of Kyoko's soul or her maternal side remains within Eva-02. For the names Zeppelin and Sōryū, staff took inspiration from two warships—one German and the other Japanese—while the name Kyōko was inspired by a character in a comic book by Shinji Wada.

==== Keel Lorenz ====
Voiced by: Mugihito (Japanese); Rick Peeples (ADV), Tom Booker (films, Amazon Prime Video Rebuild), Bill Jenkins (Funimation Rebuild), D. C. Douglas (Netflix) (English)

Keel Lorenz (キール・ローレンツ, Kīru Rōrentsu) is the president of the Human Instrumentality Committee and the secret organization Seele. Multiple cybernetic components are grafted into his body, allowing him to have vital energy despite his advanced age, being sixty-seven years old. Keel secretly manipulates the world's fate to see the Third Impact realized. Keel is of German nationality and has a calm, rational personality. For the character's name, the authors were inspired by biologist Konrad Lorenz; in the presentation document of the series, his name was Konrad.

==== Pen Pen ====
Voiced by: Megumi Hayashibara (Japanese); Amanda Winn-Lee (ADV, films, Amazon Prime Video Rebuild), Mandy Clark (Director's Cut), Monica Rial (Funimation Rebuild), Cherami Leigh (Netflix) (English)

Pen Pen, or Pen^{2} (ペンペン, Penpen) is a small pet penguin and the companion of Misato Katsuragi. Pen Pen, who belongs to a new breed of hot spring penguins, is most likely the result of a biotechnology experiment and has a serial number on his collar. He seems to have a high IQ, which allows him to bathe himself, understand human languages, read a newspaper, and live independently inside Misato's apartment. In the series' final episodes, Pen Pen is moved to a country house to live with the Horaki family. Yoshiyuki Sadamoto designed the character to meet the staff's request to include a being that could serve as the series mascot. Because the show is set in Hakone, a town known for its hot springs, Pen Pen was at first conceived as a monkey, but the idea was considered unattractive and was discarded. Pen-Pen is possibly inspired by Mister Pen-Pen (Mr．ペンペン), a genetically modified penguin that appears in a 1986 anime of the same name.

==== Shiro Tokita ====
Voiced by: Hōchū Ōtsuka (Japanese); Rob Bundy (English)

Shiro Tokita (時田シロ, Tokita Shirō) is a representative of the Community of United Chemical Industries of Japan, which is mainly responsible for the construction of the Jet Alone, a humanoid robot developed to compete with the Nerv's Eva, about which he is privy to much secret information gained from espionage operations. Shiro appears only in the seventh episode of the series, in which he openly mocks the competitors' capabilities and ridicules the Evangelions in front of the project manager Ritsuko Akagi. During the activation experiment, the Jet Alone goes out of control, threatening to create a nuclear crisis. After initial hesitation, Tokita gives Misato Katsuragi the access code to activate the stop command. For the character's name, Anno drew from Murakami's Ai to gensō no fascism; the seventh episode also features men named Manda and Yasugi, whose names are borrowed from the same novel.

== Other media ==
=== Rebuild of Evangelion ===
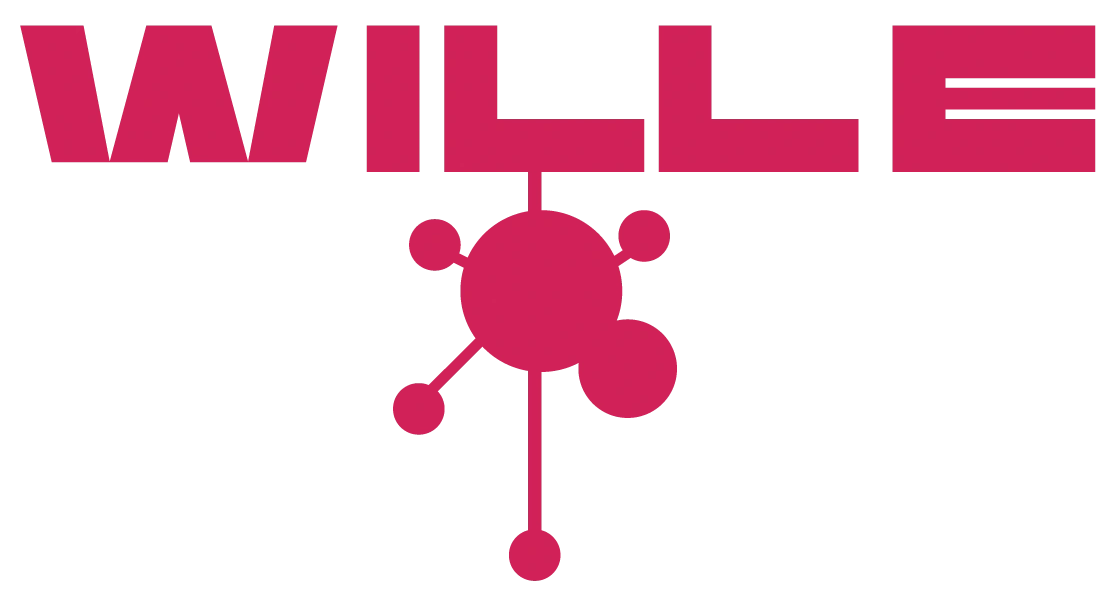
Wille's logo

In Evangelion: 3.0 You Can (Not) Redo (2012), the third installment of the Rebuild of Evangelion series, a new organization named Wille ([ˈvɪlə], German for "will") is introduced. Wille was created to destroy Nerv and is led by Misato Katsuragi.

==== Sumire Nagara ====
Voiced by: Sayaka Ōhara (Japanese); Krishna Smitha (Funimation), Rebeka Thomas (Amazon Prime Video) (English)

Sumire Nagara (長良スミレ, Nagara Sumire) is in charge of the anti-gravity system of an airship called AAA Wunder. Sumire is a dark-skinned woman in her twenties or thirties, with long brown hair worn in a ponytail. Her name derives from the class of light cruisers used by the Imperial Japanese Navy during World War II. In the original dubbing, she is played by Sayaka Ōhara, who tried to portray her as an older sister. She described Sumire as a strong woman who has endured difficulties and the deaths of several loved ones. According to the character's voice actress, she betrays her most-secret emotions through her facial expressions, and chooses her words calmly and wisely.

==== Koji Takao ====
Voiced by: Akio Ōtsuka (Japanese); Greg Dulcie (Funimation), Jake Eberle (Amazon Prime Video) (English)

Koji Takao (高雄コウジ, Takao Kōji) is one of Wille's engineers and is responsible for the engine ignition sequence of the Wunder ship. Koji presents himself as a man of robust build; he is balding, and has a goatee and a black mustache. Koji is an acquaintance of Kaji, through which he has come into contact with Misato. His name is derived from a class of four heavy cruisers of the Imperial Japanese Navy that were used in the Pacific War. In the original anime, Koji is played by Akio Ōtsuka, who had earlier dubbed the character Nemo in Nadia; he described Koji as an efficient businessman who made progress in his field.

==== Hideki Tama ====
Voiced by: Anri Katsu (Japanese); Aaron Roberts (Funimation), Scott Golden (Amazon Prime Video) (English)

Hideki Tama (多摩ヒデキ, Tama Hideki) is a young engineer and Takao's colleague on Wunder. He is skinny, has thick, black hair, and is shy and reserved; during operations, he keeps manuals under his hand for reference. The character's name is derived from that of the Japanese World-War-II-era cruiser of the same name. In the original anime, Hideki is played by Anri Katsu, who Anno commissioned to convey weakness and humanity in the character. Katsu described Hideki as a man who takes his time; he used to follow rules and slightly cowardly, but still performs his duty in times of danger, and has been trained to do the bare minimum.

==== Midori Kitakami ====
Voiced by: Mariya Ise (Japanese); Tia Ballard (Funimation), Bijou Vann (Amazon Prime Video) (English)

Midori Kitakami (北上ミドリ, Kitakami Midori) is an engineer serving on AAA Wunder. She is slim, has pink hair, and is lazy and timid. Midori's control panel is covered in sticky notes. The character's last name is derived from a Japanese cruiser that was in service from 1920 to 1945. In the original anime, Midori is played by Mariya Ise, who described Midori as a modern woman who is unwilling to undertake difficult tasks and to use formal tones with her superiors. Anno asked Ise to make Midori look like a young woman from the Yidori generation—people who were born in the late 1980s and early 1990s.

==== Sakura Suzuhara ====
Voiced by: Miyuki Sawashiro (Japanese); Felecia Angelle (English)

Sakura Suzuhara (鈴原 サクラ, Suzuhara Sakura) is a member of Wille; she is briefly introduced in Evangelion: 2.0 You Can (Not) Advance, but does not speak. Sakura is Toji's younger sister; she admires Misato, whom she takes as her role model. Sakura is kind, simple, and optimistic.

=== Detective Evangelion ===
In the video game Detective Evangelion (名探偵エヴァンゲリオン, Meitantei Evangerion) (2007), which was released for PlayStation 2 by Broccoli and is based on the spin-off manga Detective Shinji Ikari, three Nerv operators who do not appear in the original series appear; each of them oversees one of the computers of the Magi System, and each reflect the aspects of Naoko Akagi's personality contained in the machines.

==== Kaede Agano ====
Voiced by: Ai Shimizu

Kaede Agano (阿賀野 カエデ) is a simple woman with short light brown hair. She has a strong sense of family, is kind and is a good cook; she is in charge of Baltashar, in which Dr. Akagi's maternal side is reflected.

==== Satsuki Ōi ====
Voiced by: Maria Yamamoto

Satsuki Ōi (大井サツキ), a sensual, Russian-Japanese woman with long hair and a liking for vodka. Satsuki lives alone and drinks alcohol to forget her loneliness. She is responsible for Casper, Naoko's feminine side, and Shinji's sensitivity-improvement program.

==== Aoi Mogami ====
Voiced by: Yui Horie

Aoi Mogami (最上アオイ), a bespectacled, intelligent, and straightforward girl, is in charge of Melchior, which contains Naoko as a scientist and Shinji's intelligence enhancement program.

==== Victims and other characters ====
The game also includes several other characters who are brutally murdered and whose case Shinji Ikari investigates:

- Natsuko Kako (加古ナツコ), the first victim, a fourteen-year-old girl who attends Neo Tokyo-3 Middle School.
- Kyōko Nachi (那智キョウコ), second victim, a twenty-nine-year-old teacher at Neo Tokyo-3 Middle School.
- Erika Kashii (香椎エリカ), third victim, a twenty-seven-year-old woman and member of the Nerv forensic department.
- Mimi Satsuma (薩摩ミミ), fourth victim, a twenty-three-year-old teacher at Neo Tokyo-3 Middle School.

Also appearing in the game are the Shirase (白瀬市長) the mayor of Neo Tokyo-3, a man named Kokubunji (国分寺), the director of a facility called Kichijoji Bowl, and Dr. Hideaki Katsuragi (葛城ヒデアキ)—Misato's father and head of the research group that is responsible for Second Impact.

=== Evangelion Battlefield ===
Evangelion Battlefields (エヴァンゲリオンバトルフィールズ, Evangerion Batorufiiruzu) is a mobile game that was released for the operating systems iOS and Android on April 2, 2020. The game allows players to command and fight with various Evangelions. It was produced by Khara studio, and released by Mobcast and Takara Tomy Arts. The game introduces two new female characters:

- Kotone Suzunami (涼波コトネ) is a cheerful, fourteen-year-old girl who is Shinji's new fellow pilot. She is used to referring to her classmates with the Japanese honorific term senpai and is voiced by Megumi Han.
- Hitomi Amagi (天城ヒトミ) is a twenty-seven-year-old woman who is introduced as both a Nerv worker and a mental health counselor; in the second season of the title, she becomes a playable character. Hitomi is voiced by Mai Nakahara.

=== Neon Genesis Evangelion RPG: The Nerv White Paper ===
Neon Genesis Evangelion RPG: The Nerv White Paper (新世紀エヴァンゲリオンRPG NERV白書) is a tabletop role-playing game that was published by Kadokawa Shoten in 1996. The game is set during the events of the classic series, and introduces new characters and Angels.

- Commander Nikolayev (ニコラーエフ 司令官?) is the head of the Nerv's Russian section. Nikolayev is seemingly friendly, amiable, and well-mannered but in reality, with this positive attitude, he could only be stonewalling the Nerv headquarters and concealing his true character.
- Marie Vincennes (マリイ・ヴァンセンヌ?) is a fourteen-year-old girl who was born in the United States; she is a prodigy with a Ph.D. who is called by Nerv on July 7, 2005, to help advance the science of the Evangelion programs. Despite having a kind voice and good manners, Marie is self-centered and arrogant. During a welcome party dedicated to her at Misato's apartment that is attended by the main members of the organization, Marie does not bond with anyone but the penguin Pen-Pen, whom she hugs at the end of the party. Feeling she is treated as an outsider, Marie sells some of the technologies she developed to the CIA, who had contacted her previously. Following the killing of two American agents and an accident that is caused by her inventions, she realizes her mistake and confesses everything after a hospitalization. Maire tells members of the Nerv she has inserted a chip containing the program to cancel the modifications to the Evangelion's cockpits she introduced in Pen-Pen's collar. Once the danger is averted, Marie is shipped to China and assigned the development of the Eva-08. At the end of the game. Marie greets the Nerv members at Hakone Yumoto station, saying, "See you, my friends".

=== Secret of Evangelion ===
Secret of Evangelion (シークレット オブ エヴァンゲリオン, Shīkuretto Obu Evangerion) is a PlayStation 2 video game that was developed by West One and published by Jinx on December 21, 2006. It is set between the events of the final episodes of the television anime and The End of Evangelion, and features thirty scenarios and ten endings.

- Kyōya Kenzaki (剣崎キョウヤ) is a member of the first section of the Nerv's investigation department. He is the protagonist of the game; he is twenty-nine years old, projects a calm, shrewd attitude, and constantly wears sunglasses. Kyōya faithfully performs his duties, is not afraid of death, and maintains cordial relations with other people. He has known Misato, Kaji, and Ritsuko since his college days. At the beginning of Secret of Evangelion, Kyōya is tasked with delivering the Eva-04 to the Nerv headquarters but he encounters mysterious accidents, terrorist attacks, and a conspiracy within the organization. His design was handled by Shunji Suzumi, a staff member of the original series.
- Hitomi Kaga (加賀ヒトミ, Kaga Hitomi) is a scientist in Nerv's first science department; she is a brilliant but absent-minded and clumsy. Kyōya has a degree in metaphysical biology and participates in Project E along with Ritsuko Akagi, becoming involved in the development of the Eva, and the creation of the Dummy System and Dummy Plug. Hitomi plays a central role in an operation to retrieve Shinji Ikari, who is trapped inside an Evangelion unit.

=== Mana Kirishima ===
Voiced by: Megumi Hayashibara

Mana Kirishima (霧島 マナ, Kirishima Mana) is introduced in the 1997 visual novel Neon Genesis Evangelion: Girlfriend of Steel, which was published by Bandai and is set just before the thirteenth episode of the anime series. Mana is a shy, gentle, fourteen-year-old girl with reddish-hair, who is from the town Akune. She moves to class 2-A of the middle school of Tokyo-3, and immediately attracts the attention of her male classmates, especially Shinji. Shinji and Mana immediately establish a close friendship; Shinji is attracted by Mana's straightforward behavior and approaches her despite the accusations from Asuka, who is jealous and thinks Mana is a spy who wants to exploit Shinji for her own purposes.

Mana immediately treats Shinji as her boyfriend and the two, after advice from Kaji, have their first date. It is later discovered Mana actually is a spy under the orders of a rival company to Nerv, and is assigned as a pilot of a mecha called Trident, along with two men named Musashi Lee Strasberg (ムサシ・リー・ストラスバーグ) and Keita Asari (浅利 ケイタ). At one point in the game, the mecha goes out of control and the three Nerv pilots are tasked with shooting it down. Depending on the options chosen by the player, different endings (in which Mana moves to another city, dies in combat, or joins Nerv) are offered. The character's name comes from the Japanese battleship Kirishima. In addition to Girlfriend of Steel, Mana appears in the manga Neon Genesis Evangelion: The Shinji Ikari Raising Project and in Petit Eva: Evangelion@School.

=== Mayumi Yamagishi ===
Voiced by: Kyōko Hikami

Mayumi Yamagishi (山岸マユミ, Yamagishi Mayumi) is introduced in the video game Shinseiki Evangelion: 2nd Impression (新世紀エヴァンゲリオン 2nd Impression), which was released by Sega-AM2 in 1997 for Sega Saturn. Mayumi is a shy girl with long, black hair and glasses who moves into 2-A at Tokyo-3 Municipal Middle School. The game revolves around Mayumi's increasingly close relationship with Shinji, who seems to have feelings for her. Mayumi is a diligent student and has a passion for singing and reading. Following the appearance of an Angel called the "Original Angel", it is discovered Mayumi guards the enemy's core inside her body, which is its only weakness. In one of the video game's scenarios, Mayumi asks Shinji to kill her and then attempts to commit suicide but Shinji saves Mayumi, who transfers to another school after the battle is over.

=== Nene Matsukaze ===
Nene Matsukaze (松風ネネ) is introduced in the visual novel Shinseiki Evangerion Gaiden 2: Ningyō-tachi no utage (新世紀エヴァンゲリオン外伝2 〜人形達の宴〜), which Tin Machine released on May 30, 2006. Nene is a new student in class 2-A at Tokyo-3 Middle School; she constantly carries around a teddy bear, which she believes contains a spirit named Sandy. Nene's design came from a contest Gainax held to create a fan-designed character to be featured in a video game.

== Cultural impact ==
=== Popularity ===
According to Allegra Frank and Aja Romano of Vox, in Japan, Evangelion "spawned countless anime tropes", and "it remains common to see characters like Shinji, Rei, and Asuka appear in advertisements or pachinko parlors throughout Japan, and the series' iconography remains widely recognizable in the country". According to Frank, outside Japan "Evangelion's characters are well-known, beloved and memed by anime fans". The Neon Genesis Evangelion characters were immediately popular with Japanese audiences, appearing at the top of popularity charts. According to the website Sora News 24, they enjoy "eternal popularity", as evidenced by their frequent use for merchandise items. The series appeared for years in the Anime Grand Prix, a large, annual poll Animage magazine conducts. In 1996, Shinji and Gendo occupied the second and sixteenth place among the most-popular male characters; Rei, Asuka, and Misato were the first, third, and eighth, respectively, among the female ones. In 1997, the rankings saw Shinji (first), Kaworu (second), Kaji (tenth), Gendo (fourteenth), Toji (forty-fourth), and Fuyutsuki (fifty-seventh) among the male characters; and Rei (first), Asuka (fourth), Misato (eighth), Maya (nine-teenth), Ritsuko (twenty-seventh), and Hikari (forty-seventh) among the female characters. In 1998 Shinji and Kaworu maintained their placement, while Rei, Asuka, and Misato dropped to fifth, sixth, and twelfth, respectively. Some of the characters appeared in the magazine's monthly rankings for years, such as Shinji, Asuka, Rei, and Maya.

The protagonists also appeared in Newtype magazine's polls, even years after the show's first airing; from August to October 2009 they were among the most popular among the magazine's readers, both in the male and female categories. In March 2010, Newtype named Rei the most-popular female character of the 1990s, and placed Shinji first and Kaworu second in the male category.

=== Critical response ===
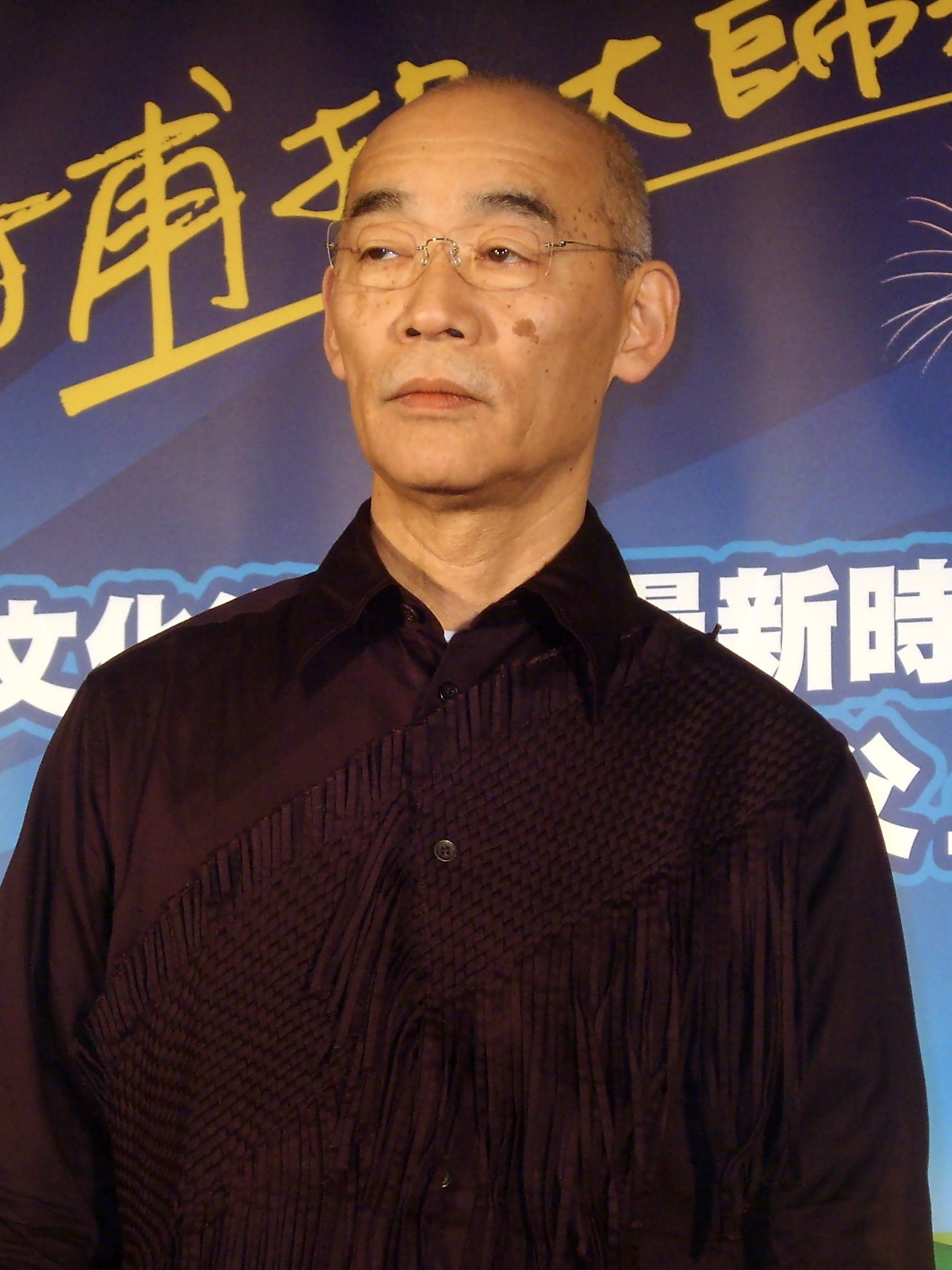
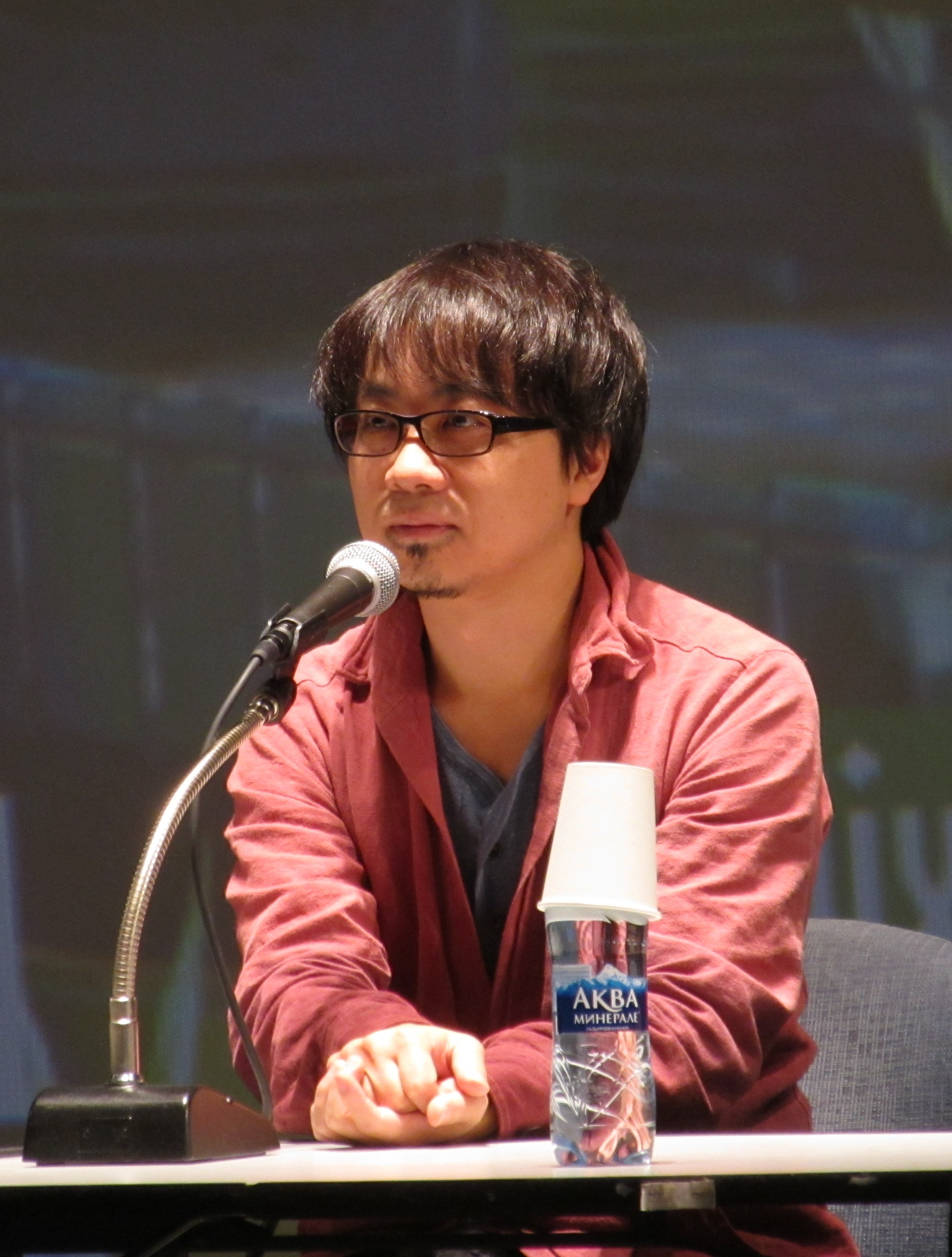
The character development of the series, and particularly the last two episodes, have received divided reception. Yoshiyuki Tomino criticized the series for suggesting the idea that "we're all depressed nervous wrecks". Makoto Shinkai appreciated the last two episodes, saying that: "Anime doesn't always have to be about crazy movement and a lot of action. Sometimes it is also about the words or even the lack of words, things not being spoken".

The characters of Neon Genesis Evangelion divided critics. Peter Harcoff of the webzine The Anime Critic did not like Shinji's weak personality and Asuka's grumpiness but praised the relationships between the characters and their motivations. The website Anime Planet was critical of some aspects of the series but praised the characters. THEM Anime Reviews's Raphael See found their characterization irritating and clichéd, saying he had seen similar personalities in previous anime. See's colleague Tim Jones, disdained the psychology of the protagonists, all of whom have tragic pasts and relationship problems, with the exception of Kaji.

An implicit sex scene between two characters in the twentieth episode caused controversy considering the show was broadcast in an afternoon time-slot, and the last two episodes completely focus on the Shinji's psychological depth and inner monologs, which raised further controversy and polarized the opinions of critics. For anthropologist Lawrence Eng, the ending does not give a sense of closure for most of the characters, and said, "for many loyal fans of Evangelion, this was a betrayal on Anno's part". Vice.com's Chia Conteras, while not finding the conclusion incomprehensible, described it as incongruent with what the protagonists faced through the rest of the series. Anime director Yoshiyuki Tomino also criticized Evangelion and rebuked the show's producers for not trying to "making fun for or gaining the sympathy of the audience", and instead trying to show "that everybody is sick" and hopeless. According to Tomino, "I don't think that's a real work of art ... I think that we should try to show people how to live healthier, fuller lives, to foster their identity as a part of their community, and to encourage them to work happily until they die. I can't accept any work that doesn't say that".

Other reviewers praised the characterization of the protagonists. According to Kotaku's Rita Jackson, "it's not fun to spend time with these characters", given the strong emotional pressure and anguish they are forced to suffer, and while "sometimes characters feel more like mouthpieces for Anno's thoughts about society than actual characters", she appreciated the writer's "brilliant" work. Morgan Lewis of the webzine VG Culture HQ stated, "none of the characters are black and white" and "all of them are screwed up beyond belief"; he called Shinji the most layered character, stating Evangelion is not suitable for an inattentive audience. A similar opinion was given by Anime News Network's Nick Creamer, according to whom one of the anime's strengths is the fact no protagonist is trapped in a simple narrative role; Creamer said, "Evangelion portrays the mindsets of its characters with empathy and nuance". According to Matthew Perez of Anime Reign magazine, "the characters are by far the most hated aspect of Neon Genesis Evangelion"; he noted many are initially archetypal and stereotypical. Perez praised the characters' realism and judged some of them to be the "most well made in anime to date".

For writer Andrea Fontana, Evangelion would be "a true sociological and psychological treatise"; he praised the introspective insight of its protagonists and the underlying message of learning to be oneself. Equally positive were the reviews from Comic Book Resources authors. Ajay Aravind praised the personalities of Rei, Misato, and Yui; Anthony Gramuglia called the protagonists "incredibly complicated and fascinating"; and Reuben Baron appreciated the characters' three-dimensionality and exploration of trauma but criticized the fan service and sexualization of the teenage characters. Other writers at Comic Book Resource described the female characters as strong, determined, and independent, and considered the series to be ahead of its time. Anime News Network's Martin Theron praised Sadamoto's "distinctive" character design. Allen Divers, another editor at Anime News Network, stated, "The characters and storyline of Evangelion would give Sigmund Freud complexes". Fellow reviewer Matt Jong also appreciated the development, calling it "provoking"; and Paul Fargo, another reviewer for the same website, praised the tragic nature and psychological depth of the second half of the series, especially in the director's-cut version of the home video editions.

=== Merchandise ===
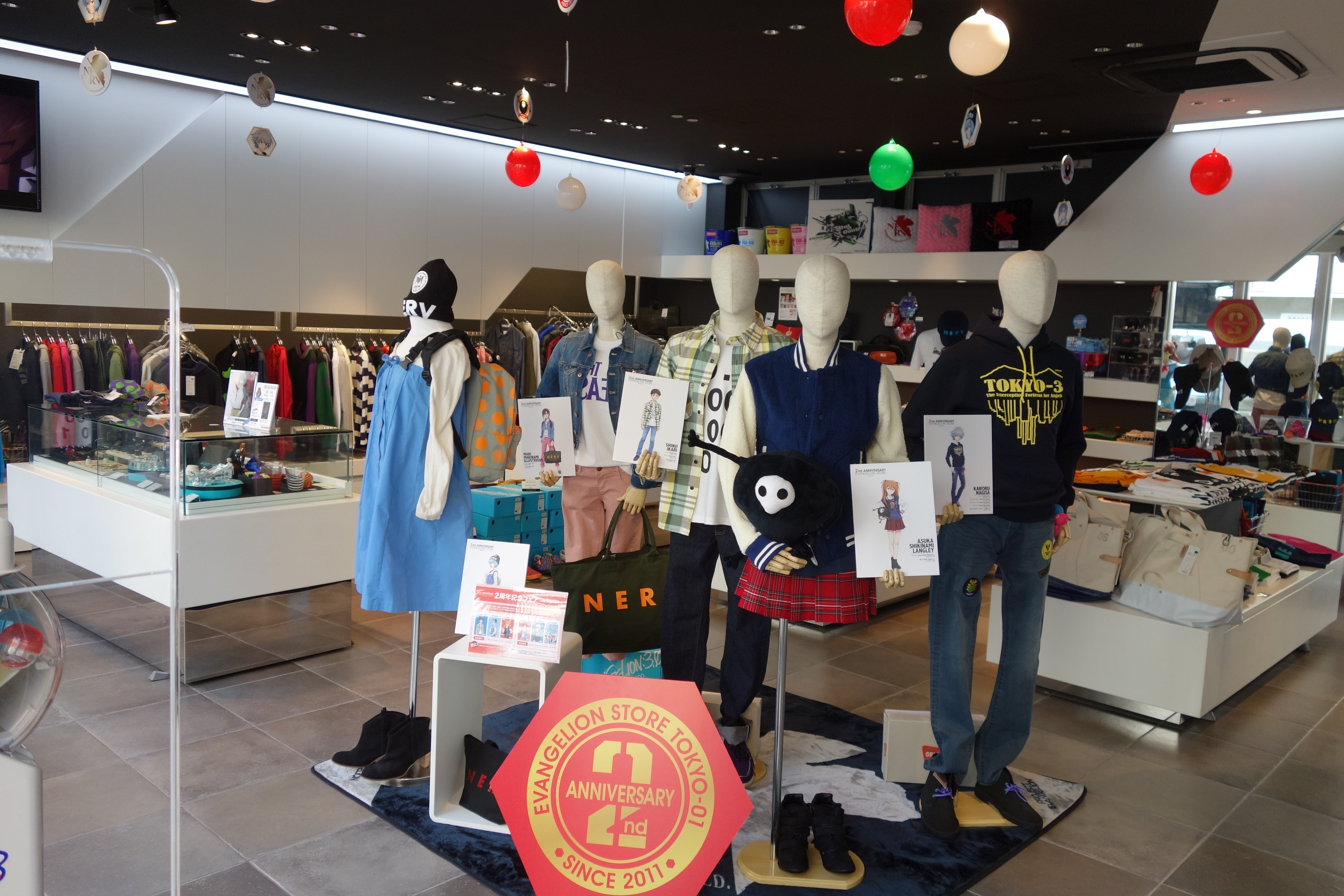
Clothes inspired by the protagonists of Evangelion at the Eva Store, the official store of the franchise

According to Neon Genesis Evangelion: The Unofficial Guide, which was written by Kazuhisa Fujie and Martin Foster, the anime's release "ignited a boom in merchandise unprecedented in a country already awash with such goods", with over 600 items being made to celebrate the event. The characters were used for T-shirts, access-dateries, posters, and watches. Action figures became the most popular items, particularly those of Rei; books featuring her image on the cover also sold quickly and media named her "the Premium Girl". When Neon Genesis Evangelion: Death & Rebirth was released in 1997, the UCC Ueshima Coffee Co. company marketed coffee cans with the characters of the series, selling 400,000 cases—about twelve million cans; after the release of Evangelion: 1.0 You Are (Not) Alone in 2007, another 300,000 cases containing about nine million cans were sold. In 1997, a series of books dedicated to the show's protagonists was published; Rei, Asuka, Shinji and Kaworu, along with two artbooks titled Photo File Eve, about only the female protagonists, and Photo File Adam, dedicated to the male characters. In the same year, a catalog titled "E Mono" containing articles about the series and the characters was published; it also listed some dōjinshi—unofficial comics made by fans.

According to critic Pier Francesco Cantelli, "it is impossible to take a tour of Akihabara without coming across at least one poster depicting [the show's] protagonists"; he also compared the success of the Evangelion franchise to the popularity of Star Wars in the United States. Neon Genesis Evangelion protagonists also appear in video games based on the original animated series and media not belonging to the Evangelion franchise; these include Monster Strike, Super Robot Wars, Tales of Zestiria, Puzzle & Dragons, Keri hime sweets, Summons Board, Puyopuyo!! Quest, Line Rangers, Unison, MapleStory, Valkyrie Connect, Ragnarok Online, The Battle Cats and an official crossover episode of Shinkansen Henkei Robo Shinkalion.

=== Legacy ===
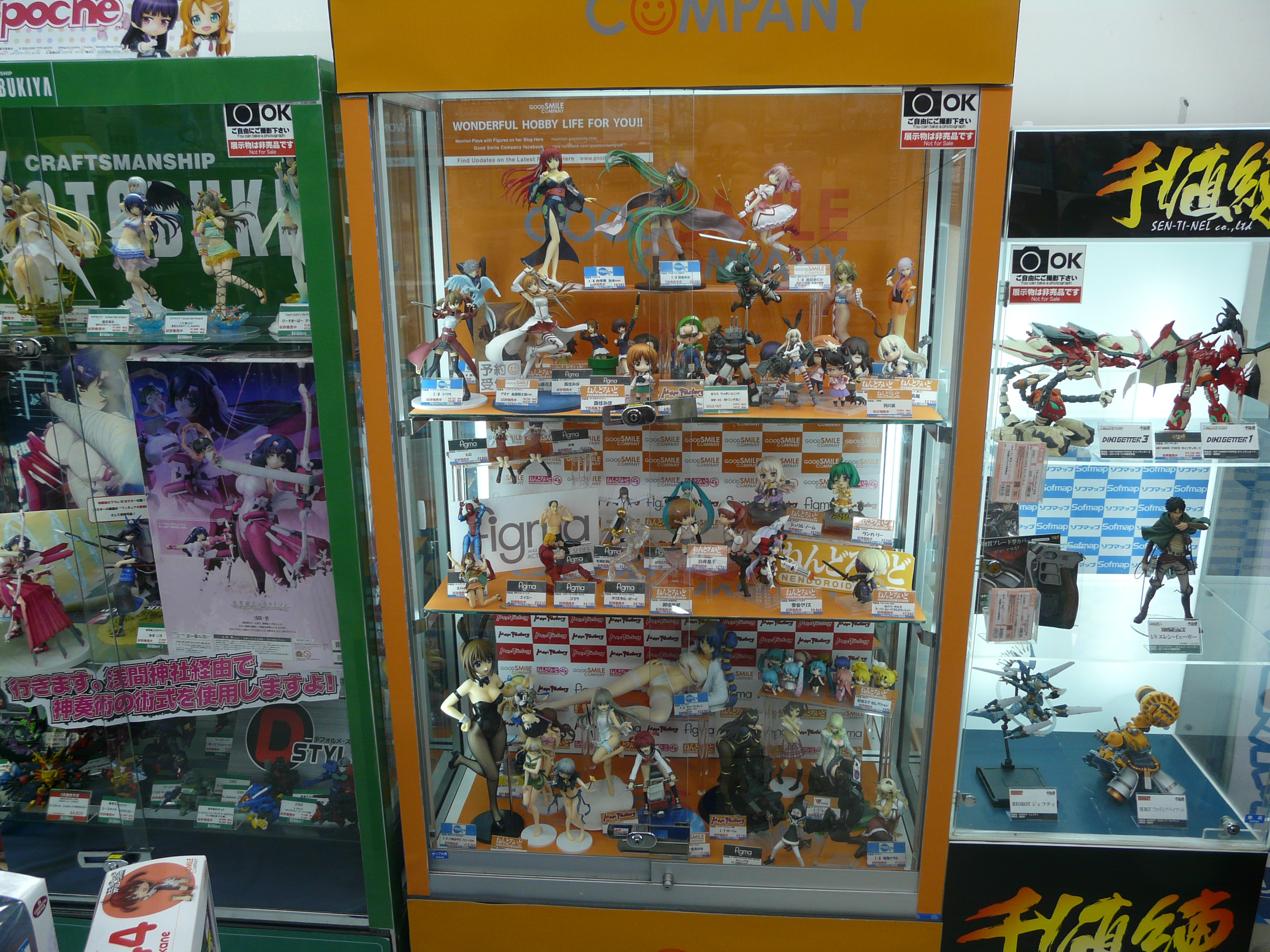
A store in Akihabara. The series is believed to be the starting point of the moe boom and the transformation of Akihabara, which became famous for its otaku-themed stores.

The protagonists of Neon Genesis Evangelion appeared on the covers of magazines specializing in anime and manga, such as Animage and Newtype, and the anime became the most-discussed product of the Japanese animation industry. Since the broadcast of the first episode at Comiket conventions, it appeared in the dōjin market, attracting male and female audiences in equal numbers. The Artifice's Justin Wu attributed the characters' success to several factors, such as Sadamoto's designs and the open-ended nature of the product, which is characterized by obscure points and facts that are left to viewers' interpretation and imagination; according to him, Neon Genesis Evangelion is a pivotal event in the history of merchandise, which became an important market. According to Newtype magazine, after the anime's success, "hordes of otaku fllooded Akihabra in search of the enigmatic Rei Ayanami, and companies realized for the first time that catering to the geek crowd could be very profitable ... Akihabara itself has transformed from an 'electric town' famous for household appliances to the geek paradise it is today". Such a high trade in figures, trading cards, and similar products began the moe phenomenon, in which the audience's attention is focused on empathy and attraction to the characters rather than the plot. According to scholar Patrick Galbraith, Neon Genesis Evangelion began a massive growth in anime that focused on cute girls, causing the fanzine and figure markets to grow tenfold due to viewers' emotional response to the characters, with "[e]ntire fanzine conventions ... committed to the series and its characters".

Journal AsianScape described the representation of Evangelion's characters as "possibly the most innovative and influential aspect" of the series, with the presentation of characters with deep, psychic traumas and alienation. Game Developer's Brett Fujioka wrote, "Eva turned hackneyed anime tropes and archetypes on their heads through its characters ... [Anno's] psychologically malcontent characters resonated with Japanese youth at the time". Leading researchers also studied the characters' success. Japanese sociologist Shinji Miyadai, among others, reported instances of college students identifying with Shinji or Asuka; according to essayist Satomi Ishikawa, such episodes are a reflection of "how influential the impact of this particular anime has been" for Japanese youth at the time. Ishikawa noted in the years after the series aired, it became very popular, giving rise to the expression "Eva phenomenon", and many fans saw themselves in the protagonists. The central element and the reason for so much attraction to Evangelion is in Japanese called jibun sagashi (自分探し; "self-seeking"), a theme that aroused empathy in the youth, who saw their problems in Shinji and Asuka. According to Ishikawa, Neon Genesis Evangelion became associated with the concept of "adult children" that was initially developed by U.S. psychologists and became the focus of Japanese media attention in the late 1990s.

As a result of the success of Neon Genesis Evangelion, the sekaikei genre, in which plots combine apocalyptic crises with the sentimental comedy of school settings, spread and became popular; the love stories of the protagonists of such works are directly related to the fate of the world. Several representatives of this genre were inspired by Anno's series they are mainly oriented on the psychology of the characters and their relationships rather than on the plot, becoming one of the main motifs of Japanese subculture. The neologism sekaikei was often replaced with the expression "post-Evangelion syndrome". Critics have identified sekaikei elements in Voices of a Distant Star, She, the Ultimate Weapon, Iriya no Sora, UFO no Natsu, Your Name., and The Melancholy of Haruhi Suzumiya, interpreted as a parody of it. According to Comic Book Resources's Timothy Donohoo, female heroes Rei and Asuka are "extremely important to the development of modern anime writing ... All of Evangelion's characters were influential and imitated, but in particular Rei and Asuka created a prototype for entertaining romantic interests that future series would use again and again". Patrick Drazen wrote, "Evangelion exerted a very heavy influence in terms of character design on the anime that came after it". Rei is considered particularly popular and influential, and inspired several female heroes who came later and contributed to the spread of the kuudere stereotype, with apparently cold, apathetic, and mysterious characters. Asuka, Shinji, Misato and Gendo also inspired artists, characters in other animated series, video games, and comics. Asuka is considered an influential example of a tsundere protagonist; she is grumpy, short-tempered, and authoritarian but has a tragic past and deep motivations behind it.

According to The Washington Post's Gene Park, a considerable portion of cyberculture is rooted in the success of Evangelion, which is popular on 4chan and other websites. According to Park, fans of the series are divided between Asuka and Rei, and have generated the waifu wars, a phenomenon in which users of blogs and websites clash to determine with different arguments which character is the most attractive. Maria R. Rider of Ex.org noted Gainax's series has inspired Gasaraki's character design, and particularly that of Miharu, who is similar to Rei, while writers for Anime Feminist website noted similarities between Kensuke Aida and José Carlos Takasuka from Kuromukuro. Rurouni Kenshin's author Nobuhiro Watsuki compared his character Yukishiro Tomoe to Rei; he also used Yui as the visual model for Honjō Kamatari's face.
