= Tomo Saeki =

Japanese voice actress

Tomo Saeki (サエキ トモ (佐伯 智), Saeki Tomo, born February 2, 1973) is a Japanese voice actress.

== Notable voice roles ==
- Bastard!! as Obaba
- Cardcaptor Sakura as Yukie Kimura
- Coji-Coji as Tanuki
- Dai-Guard
- Di Gi Charat as Coo Erhard
- Di Gi Charat - A Trip to the Planet as Coo Erhard
- Di Gi Charat Christmas Special as Coo Erhard
- Di Gi Charat Natsuyasumi Special as Coo Erhard
- Di Gi Charat Nyo! as Coo Erhard
- Di Gi Charat Ohanami Special as Coo Erhard
- Di Gi Charat Summer Special as Coo Erhard
- Digimon Tamers as Kai Urazoe
- Dragon Drive as Gokaku
- Galaxy Angel A as Malibu Peirou
- Galaxy Angel X as Malibu Peirou
- Gunslinger Girl as Emilio
- Juvenile Orion as Tsukasa Amou
- Khronos Gear as Napo=Leo
- Leave it to Piyoko! as Coo Erhard
- Magical Shopping Arcade Abenobashi as Satoshi Imamiya
- Magical Witchland as Nonononn
- Magical Play 3D as Nonononn
- Master of Mosquiton '99 as boy (ep 22); child (ep 23); housewife (ep 2)
- Millennium Actress
- Mon Colle Knights as Mondo Ooya
- Mouse as Machiko Tsukioka
- Neppu Kairiku Bushi Road as Hashiba Hinata
- Ojamajo Doremi as Igarashi-senpai
- Ojamajo Doremi as Akatsuki
- Outlaw Star as Lady (ep 2)
- Petite Princess Yucie as Cube
- Reiwa no Di Gi Charat as Coo Erhard
- Sol Bianca: The Legacy as Jani
- A Little Snow Fairy Sugar as Salt
- A Little Snow Fairy Sugar Summer Special as Salt
- The Melody of Oblivion as Solo
- Very Private Lesson as Kojishi
