= Magical Play =

Japanese ONA series

魔法遊戯 (Mahō Yūgi)
- Genre: Comedy, Magical girl
- Original net animation
- Directed by: Hiroki Hayashi
- Written by: Hiroshi Ōnogi
- Music by: Seikou Nagaoka
- Studio: AIC
- Licensed by: NA: Sentai Filmworks
- Released: 16 November 2001 – 3 May 2002
- Episodes: 24
- Original video animation

Magical Play 3D
- Directed by: Hiroki Hayashi
- Written by: Hideyuki Kurata
- Music by: Seikou Nagaoka
- Studio: AIC
- Licensed by: NA: Sentai Filmworks
- Released: 29 December 2001

Magical Play (魔法遊戯 飛び出す!! ハナマル大冒険, Mahō Yūgi Tobidasu!! Hanamaru Daibōken) is a Japanese original net animation directed by Hiroki Hayashi featuring character designs by Kiyohiko Azuma. It was webcast from November 16, 2001, to May 3, 2002, totaling twenty-four episodes. The magical girl satire was later compiled into four half-hour episodes and released on four DVDs. A 3D OVA episode was released on December 29, 2001.

There are two manga adaptions of this series. One is drawn by Yoshitaka Yoshino and the other is by Yukimaru Katsura.

ADV Films announced the licensing of the show on April 7, 2003, and has released a two disc DVD complete set.

== Plot ==
Padudu is a girl who travels to Sweetland from her own land, Sea Heaven. Once there, she competes with many others, in challenges ranging from simple contests to fights. These earn her Hanamaru, which are simple flower-shaped stamps. When enough are collected, the collector gets the right to become a magical girl on Earth.

== Story ==
The story begins with Padudu, a girl from the aquatic land Sea Heaven, who has been traveling trying to collect Hanamaru. She accidentally interrupts a fight between Pipin and another combatant. Pipin defeats her opponent. As Pipin jumps up and down in celebration, Padudu suddenly falls on top of and incapacitates her. An elderly judge declares Padudu as the winner of the contest and awards Padudu with a Hanamaru. A frustrated Pipin accuses Padudu of stealing her Hanamaru and declares Padudu her lifelong rival. Although at first she seems to hate Padudu for 'stealing' her Hanamaru, over time, they develop a good relationship.

As Padudu and Pipin travel together, they meet an older girl, who is also trying to become a magical girl and has already collected many Hanamaru. Her name is MyuMyu, and she eventually joins the duo.

Every once in a while, they meet Nonononn, a criminal who is on the run, and it is revealed she is from Sea Heaven. They are usually intrigued by her presence, and Padudu wants to be friends with her. Unlike the others, she does not join the group and continues on her own. It's revealed she used to travel with Queen Purilun, and they both tried together to become magical girls but, at one point, they took separate paths. A running gag is that it is usually Nononnon's fault for getting Padudu arrested by Ketchup and Mustard.

=== Magical Play 3D ===
Magical Play 3D is an OVA that retells the Magical Play story. Magical Play 3D is noticeably more serious and violent than the original series. Padudu is captured and taken to jail by Ketchup and Mustard. Coincidentally, Nonononn is her cellmate. The keeper of the jail, Cofy, beckons them to fight her and her 'sister' panther, Panpan. Nononnon and Padudu end up killing Panpan, and Cofy is shot dead. Afterwards, Purilun is shown looking over her city.

== Major characters ==
Padudu, Pipin and MyuMyu

Padudu (パドドゥ, Padodu)
Voiced by: Ai Tokunaga (Japanese); Larissa Wolcott (English)
Padudu is a 12-year-old girl from Sea Heaven who is slightly dimwitted. She is on a quest to become a magical girl on Earth. Her companion, Uokichi, is a fish she wears as a cloak and uses as a food supply.
Pipin (ピピン)
Voiced by: Ryōka Shima (Japanese); Samantha Inoue-Harte (English)
Pipin is Padudu's "lifelong rival". Pipin is an obsessive girl who is also trying to become Earth's next magical girl. She wears a bunny girl costume and her companion is a rabbit she wears as a backpack.
MyuMyu (ミュミュ)
Voiced by: Kazusa Murai (Japanese); Leigh Anderson Fisher (English)
MyuMyu is a manipulative girl who wants to use the status of magical girl as a stepping stone to becoming queen of Sweetland. She fools Padudu into believing she is sweet and innocent. Her companions are two flat cats — Lyka and Akyl — who she wears as a bathing suit.
Nonononn (ノノノン, Nononon)
Voiced by: Tomo Saeki (Japanese); Katherine Catmull (English)
Nonononn is Sweetland's most wanted criminal. She was betrayed by Queen Purilun while the two traveled together to become magical girls. Originally from Sea Heaven, her companion is a hammerhead shark who is rarely seen in the anime. She spent some time living in Japan with a middle-class family during the 1960s, yet only appears to be about ten or fifteen years older than she appeared then.
Purilun (プリルン, Purirun)
Voiced by: Yūko Minaguchi (Japanese); Cristina Kimlicko-Jones (English)
Queen Purilun is the Queen of Sweetland. Much like MyuMyu, she acts nice and caring in the public eye but behind the scenes, she is manipulative and cruel. Like Nonononn, she spent time living in Japan during the 1960s, but in her case with a rich family.
Zucchini (ズッキーニ, Zukīni)
Voiced by: Yumiko Kobayashi (Japanese); John Minnich (English)
Zucchini is Queen Purilun's lackey. He is sent to spy on and dispose of MyuMyu and Nonononn. However, whenever he tries anything, he is invariably foiled by MyuMyu's breasts and his own incompetence.
Ketchup (ケチャップ, Kechappu) & Mustard (マスタード, Masutādo)
Mustard is Voiced by: Nanae Katō (Japanese); Lana Lesley (English)
Ketchup is Voiced by: Ryōko Nagata (Japanese); Shawn Sides (English)
Ketchup and Mustard are part of the Dance Valley police station, Sweetland's police force. They spend most of their time chasing Nonononn and falsely arresting Padudu. Ketchup is one rank higher than Mustard.
