= Hiroki Hayashi =

Japanese animation director

- 林 宏樹
- Born: Yamaguchi Prefecture, Japan
- Occupations: Animator, Director
- Years active: 1987–present
- Notable work: Sol Bianca, Tenchi Muyo! Ryo-Ohki, El-Hazard, Magical Play

Hiroki Hayashi (林 宏樹, Hayashi Hiroki) is a Japanese animator and director associated with AIC. He is best known as the director of the first Tenchi Muyo! Ryo-Ohki OVA series and co-creator of El-Hazard.

== Biography ==
Hayashi got started in animation on ThunderCats and Silverhawks. He joined AIC when he was 21 years old. His first anime was Gall Force in 1987. In 1988 he worked on the storyboard for the fourth OVA episode of Bubblegum Crisis, along with Masaki Kajishima. His first directed title was Sol Bianca of which he would also be credited for the original concept in the second OVA. In his interview with AIC, he said that Sol Bianca was originally a game production proposal when it was brought to AIC; he thought it would make a good OVA, and created the story base for the series.

His breakout title was with Kajishima as director and co-creator of the Tenchi Muyo! Ryo-Ohki OVA series. They wanted to create a series much like Gall Force and Bubblegum Crisis where there were many guys with one girl and vice versa, but with more comedy than Bubblegum Crisis since the latter was rather serious. Bubblegum's Mackey was the prototype for Tenchi but he would become the main character in contrast to the girls in Bubblegum. He and Kajishima also created Ryoko as an inspiration from I Dream of Jeannie. Following the first OVA series, he left the second series to the producers.

Hayashi's next major production was the first El-Hazard OVA series. In his AIC interview, he said that he wanted to carefully produce it, learning from his experience from Tenchi Muyo!. He was influenced by the sci-fi novel A Princess of Mars and used some of those ideas towards El-Hazard. He was later asked to work on the 3rd OVA series but declined as he thought it was best if the series ended at its peak and sequels would end up as average as those in the of Mars series.

Hayashi was inspired to create Black Heaven after hanging out with his friend at a 24-hour udon restaurant where he noticed many middle-aged businessmen and their interest and enthusiasm over the Lupin the 3rd film. He also enjoyed music and was inspired by a pub owner who gave up his dream of being a pro guitar player to do his business. The title character was inspired by a manga called Shooting Star Manager in which that character used to play guitar when he was young and now just takes the commuter train a lot.

At Sakura-Con 2001, he previewed his anime series Magical Play. The series was his first 3D animation project, which he worked with CG director Mitsutaka Iguchi. In his AIC interview, he said that it started as some experimental CG work, but he thought it would be better to present it as a story, and so he developed that. In the series, Padudu's companion Uokichi double as a food supply; Hayashi said that he got that idea from a comic book he was reading in a waiting room about an alien who was so devoted to his master that he used his own body as food.

He was also the lead director on other Pioneer titles such as Bubblegum Crisis Tokyo 2040 TV series, Battle Athletes, and Battle Programmer Shirase.

== Filmography ==
| Year | Title | Crew role | Notes | Source |
|---|---|---|---|---|
| 1984 | Story of the Soya | Design | | |
| 1985 | ThunderCats | Artist | American TV series | |
| 1987 | Gall Force | Assistant Director | Ep. 2 | |
| 1987 | Wanna-Be's | Assistant staff | | |
| 1987 | Black Magic M-66 | Animation Director | | |
| 1988 | Bubblegum Crisis | Storyboard | Ep. 4: "Revenge Road" | |
| 1989 | Explorer Woman Ray | Director | | |
| 1990 | Iczer Reborn | Storyboard | Ep. 2, 4 | |
| 1990 | Sol Bianca | Storyboard; Original concept, Director | OVA1; OVA2 | |
| 1992 | Tenchi Muyo! Ryo-Ohki | Storyboard, Story concept, Director | OAV1 series | |
| 1994 | Tenchi Muyo: Mihoshi Special | Executive producer, story concept | OVA1 bonus episode | |
| 1995 | El-Hazard: The Magnificent World | Storyboard, Director | OVA1 | |
| 1995 | El-Hazard: The Magnificent World | Original concept, Series construction | TV series | |
| 1995 | Magical Girl Pretty Sammy | Story concept | OVA1 | |
| 1995 | Magical Project S | Original concept | TV series | |
| 1997 | Battle Athletes | Original concept, Director | Also music/lyrics "Dream of Matoroyurinngo" | |
| 1997 | Battle Athletes | Director | Sega Saturn game | |
| 1997 | El-Hazard: The Magnificent World | Original concept | OVA2 | |
| 1998 | Bubblegum Crisis: Tokyo 2040 | Director | | |
| 1999 | Black Heaven | Original concept | | |
| 2001 | Magical Play | Original concept, Storyboard, Director | First 3D animation | |
| 2003 | Battle Programmer Shirase | Creator, Director | | |
| 2004 | Burn-Up Scramble | Director | | |
| 2005 | Girls Bravo | Storyboards | Eps. 11 and 12 | |
| 2005 | Shuffle! | Episode Director | Ep. 14 | |
| 2012 | Khronos Gear | Director | | |
