= Kim Sevier =

American actress

- Born: Kimberly K. Robertson; 1968 (age 57–58); U.S.
- Occupation: Voice Actor
- Notable credit(s): Dirty Pair Flash as Yuri; Neon Genesis Evangelion as Yui Ikari

Kimberly Robertson, a.k.a. Kim Sevier, is an American voice actress. She has done voice work for ADV Films.

== Roles ==
- Blue Seed – Moe Fujimiya, Reiko Kanbayashi
- Burn Up W – Chisato
- Devil Hunter Yohko – Princess Yanagi
- Dirty Pair Flash – Yuri
- Ellica – Maeyard
- Fire Emblem – Shiida
- Golden Boy – Noriko
- Kimera – Kimera
- Neon Genesis Evangelion – Yui Ikari (original dub)
- New Cutie Honey – Golddigger
- Panzer Dragoon – Alita
- Princess Minerva – Blue Morris
- Sol Bianca OVA – April Bikirk
- Those Who Hunt Elves – Gabriella, Skeleton
