= Tiffany Grant =

American voice actress (born 1968)

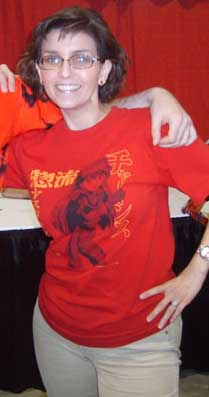
- Grant at the 2007 Calgary Comic and Entertainment Expo
- Born: Tiffany Lynn Grant; October 11, 1968 (age 57); Houston, Texas, U.S.
- Education: College of Charleston
- Occupations: Voice actress; script writer
- Years active: 1994–present
- Agent: Pastorini-Bosby Talent Agency
- Spouses: Stephen Hoy (m. 1990; div. 1995) Matt Greenfield (m. 2003; div. 2018)
- Website: tiffanygrant.com

Tiffany Lynn Grant (born October 11, 1968) is an American voice actress and script writer who is known for her English-dubbing work for anime films and television series such as Neon Genesis Evangelion, in which she voiced the character Asuka Langley Soryu.

== Biography ==
Grant was born in Houston, Texas. She was the first actor hired by ADV Films in February 1994. Grant's first work in the field was Raina from Guy: Double Target. In 1996, she was cast as Asuka Langley Soryu, one of the main female characters in Neon Genesis Evangelion. She would later go on to write ADR scripts for several anime shows, having written over 200 TV episodes to date. Grant is also known for portraying Nojiko in One Piece, Altena in Noir, and Ryoko Subaru in Martian Successor Nadesico. Grant is an independent contractor, and in addition to her work at ADV Films, she has also worked for Funimation, Seraphim Digital/Sentai Filmworks, and Illumitoon Entertainment.

Grant enjoyed her role as Asuka Soryu so much that she briefly reprised the character in the radio plays and fan-produced anime derived from the fan fiction series Neon Genesis Evangelion: R, as well as cosplaying as Asuka in her red EVA-02 plugsuit and her school uniform at anime conventions. She reprised the role of Asuka in Funimation's Evangelion: 2.0 You Can (Not) Advance. In 2014, she reprised as Asuka again for Evangelion: 3.0 You Can (Not) Redo, and she once again played Asuka in Evangelion: 3.0+1.0 Thrice Upon a Time.

== Personal life ==
Grant married A.D. Vision co-founder Matt Greenfield on March 8, 2003. They divorced on January 4, 2018.

== Dubbing roles ==
=== Anime ===
1994

- Guy: Double Target – Raina (debut role)

1995

- Burn Up! – Maki
- Samurai Shodown: The Motion Picture – Charlotte, Goro's Mom

1996

- Blue Seed – Kome Sawaguchi
- Burn-Up W – Maki
- Devil Hunter Yohko – Chikako Ogawa
- Ellcia – Eira
- F³ – Mayaka
- Golden Boy – President
- Gunsmith Cats – Becky Farrah
- Neon Genesis Evangelion – Asuka Langley Soryu (ADV dub)
- Power Dolls – Millicient Evans
- Super Atragon – Avatar, Go (Young)

1997

- Fire Emblem – Sister Lena
- Kimera – Jay's Wife
- Plastic Little – Elysse
- Sol Bianca – June Ashel

1998

- Dark Warrior – Rosa
- Dragon Knight – Queen Neina
- Galaxy Fraulein Yuna – Mai
- Kimagure Orange Road: Summer's Beginning – Minami Asakura
- New Cutey Honey – Daiko Hayami
- Princess Minerva – Orlin
- Slayers: The Motion Picture – Loofa
- Those Who Hunt Elves – Mihke, Pichi

1999

- Dirty Pair OVA – Sam
- Sorcerer Hunters – Chocolate Misu
- Martian Successor Nadesico – Ryoko Subaru

2000

- Dragon Half – Dug Finn

2001

- Princess Nine – Yoko Tokashiki, Rumi

2002

- Chance Pop Session – Jun
- Excel Saga – Misaki Matsuya, Kumi-Kumi, Sendora
- Neon Genesis Evangelion: Death and Rebirth – Asuka Langley Soryuu
- The End of Evangelion – Asuka Langley Soryuu
- Steel Angel Kurumi – Tsunami

2003

- All Purpose Cultural Cat Girl Nuku Nuku – Kyouko
- Angelic Layer – Sai Jounouchi
- Aura Battler Dunbine – Queen Pat Ford
- Legend of the Mystical Ninja – Tsukasa
- Magical Shopping Arcade Abenobashi – Gin Yamamoto, Amiryun
- Martian Successor Nadesico: The Motion Picture – Prince of Darkness – Ryoko Subaru
- Najica Blitz Tactics – Ai Irie, Alpha, Tomo, BBB
- Neo Ranga – Tomoka Chikamatsu
- Noir – Altena
- Prétear – A-ko
- RahXephon – Kim Hotaru
- Saint Seiya – Akira, Mimo (ADV Dub)

2004

- Aquarian Age: Sign for Evolution – Kiriko Heguri
- Azumanga Daioh – Kaorin
- Case Closed (FUNimation dub) – Tina Fontana (Ep. 22), Tracy Monroe (Ep. 55)
- Chrono Crusade – Satella Harvenheit
- Cyber Team in Akihabara – Suzume Sakurajosui, Francesca
- D.N. Angel – Yuji Nishimura
- Fullmetal Alchemist – Marta
- Grrl Power – Riku
- Kaleido Star – Jonathan the Seal, Charlotte
- Mezzo DSA – Manon
- Megazone 23 OVA – Cindy (Part 2), Dominique (Part 3) (ADV dub)
- Orphen Revenge – Esperanza
- Panyo Panyo Di Gi Charat – Gema
- Puni Puni Poemy – Kumi Kumi, Mage Queen
- Sister Princess – Haruka
- Slayers Excellent – Sirene
- A Tree of Palme – Pu

2005

- Divergence Eve – Lt. Yung
- Elfen Lied – Kisaragi
- Full Metal Panic? Fumoffu – Bonta-Kun, Yoshiki Akutsu
- Godannar – Shizuru Fujimura
- Maburaho – Kuriko Kazetsubaki
- Princess Tutu – Anteaterina
- Wandaba Style – Susumu Tsukumo

2006

- Comic Party Revolution – Yu Inagawa
- Nanaka 6/17 – Pikota
- Papuwa – Eguchi
- Shin-chan (Funimation dub) – Summer
- Speed Grapher – Joe's Girlfriend (Ep. 19)
- The Super Dimension Fortress Macross – Hikaru Ichijo (Young), Moruk Laplamiz, Yotchan
- UFO Ultramaiden Valkyrie – Nina

2007

- Air – Potato
- Beet the Vandel Buster – Beet (Young)
- Best Student Council – Biiko Mikawa, Hikaruko Kenma
- Gurren Lagann – Yoko Littner (aborted ADV dub)
- Hell Girl – Masami Sekimoto
- Jing, King of Bandits: Seventh Heaven – Mint
- Kurau: Phantom Memory – Ayaka Stieger
- Mushishi – Suzu (Ep. 15)
- One Piece – Nojiko, Harry, Shalria (Funimation dub)
- Tsubasa: Reservoir Chronicle – Ashuraou
- The Wallflower – Sunako's Aunt
- Xenosaga: The Animation – Juli Mizrahi

2008

- Magikano – Rika Anju
- Moonlight Mile – Akemi Saruwatari, Connie Wong, Narrator (Ep. 5-8)
- Ouran High School Host Club – Kuretake (Ep. 11)

2010

- Blue Drop – Akane Kawashima, Mitsuyo Asakura, Blue A.I.
- Fullmetal Alchemist: Brotherhood – Martel
- Linebarrels of Iron – Yui Ogawa
- Tears to Tiara – Morgan

2011

- Clannad After Story – Harada, Additional Voices
- Rebuild of Evangelion – Asuka Langley Shikinami
- Five Numbers! – R21 (Woman/Sting), Coupier (The Cat)
- Night Raid 1931 – Qing-Li Cui (Ep. 0), Additional Voices

2012

- Ef: A Fairy Tale of the Two – Sumire Asou
- The Book of Bantorra – Rithly Charon
- Infinite Stratos – Laura Bodewig, Yuko Tanitomo
- Planzet – Yura Yoshizawa

2013

- AKB0048 – Kirara, Yuka's Mother
- Another – Bird
- Bodacious Space Pirates – Izumi Yunomoto
- Fairy Tail the Movie: Phoenix Priestess – Momon
- Girls und Panzer – Midoriko Sono/Sadoko
- Intrigue in the Bakumatsu – Irohanihoheto – Oryo (Ep. 9-10)
- Majikoi! – Oh! Samurai Girls – Christiane Friedrich
- Little Busters! – Kudryavka Noumi, Chernushka
- Nakaimo – My Sister is Among Them! – Maiko Kotori
- One Piece Film: Strong World – Nojiko
- Say "I Love You". – Mei's Mother
- Shining Hearts: Shiawase no Pan – Sorbet
- Tokyo Magnitude 8.0 – Yuki Onosawa
- Tsuritama – Coco

2014

- Hakkenden: Eight Dogs of the East – Fox Guardians
- MM! – Shizuka Sado
- Majestic Prince – Marie, Peko Yamada
- Maria Holic – Yonakuri-san, Mii Habutae
- Tamako Market – Fumiko Mitsumura
- The Ambition of Oda Nobuna – Ikeda Tsuneoki, Magara Naozumi, Mitsuhide's Mother

2015

- Akame ga Kill! – Girl in Trouble (Ep. 2), Koro, Rogue (Bols' Daughter, Ep. 13)
- Magical Warfare – Mahoko
- The World God Only Knows – Lune
- Vampire Hunter D – Medusa (Sentai dub)

2016

- Cross Ange – Emma Bronson
- Den-noh Coil - Densuke, Daichi Sawaguchi
- Fate/kaleid Prism Illya 2wei! – Sella
- Re: Hamatora – Nice (Young)
- Hanayamata – Jennifer N. Fountainstand
- Wizard Barristers – Megumi Sudo, Keiji

2017

- Ushio and Tora - Saya Takatori, Helena Markov
- Amagi Brilliant Park - Moffle
- Chivalry of a Failed Knight - Renren Tomaru, Young Ikki Kurogane
- Tamako Love Story - Fumiko Mitsumura, Baton girls, Sweets girl

2018

- Flip Flappers - Cocona's grandmother

=== Video games ===
- Unlimited Saga - Armic
- Deus Ex: Invisible War – Klara Sparks
- Brawl Stars – Bea
- Warframe – Roky

== ADR staff credits ==
=== English translator ===
- Ah! My Goddess: Flights of Fancy
- Angelic Layer
- Coicent
- Comic Party Revolution
- Den-noh Coil
- Fire Emblem
- Godannar
- Infinite Stratos
- Maburaho
- Parasyte -the maxim-
- Sister Princess
- Tears to Tiara
- The Wallflower
