= Battle Programmer Shirase =

Japanese anime television series

- Promotional image featuring the main characters and the show's logo

BPSバトルプログラマーシラセ (Bīpīesu Batoru Puroguramā Shirase)
- Genre: Comedy, science fiction
- Anime television series
- Directed by: Hiroki Hayashi
- Music by: Seikou Nagaoka
- Studio: AIC, GANSIS
- Licensed by: NA: Maiden Japan
- Original network: TV Kanagawa
- Original run: 3 October 2003 – 4 January 2004
- Episodes: 15

Battle Programmer Shirase (BPS バトルプログラマーシラセ, Bīpīesu Batoru Puroguramā Shirase) is an anime television series aired in 2003 and produced by AIC.

The original series spans 5 story arcs across 15 episodes of 12 minutes each.

== Plot summary ==
The story of BPS revolves around a "freelance artist" named Akira Shirase. He is a very talented, yet mysterious computer programmer. Because of his incredible abilities, he is contacted by several individuals (all of them are very similar persons named Akizuki Kaoru) to do all sorts of strange computer-related hacking/security jobs.

Akira is a very quiet guy who lives alone in a small apartment near his niece's house. At first, the episodes revolved around some freelance jobs that highlighted his abilities - however, later on in the series, characters came back and offered help or plot twists. The school that Shirase had gone to had been hinted throughout the series, and it finally made an appearance in the last episode, when some of the characters began to show their hidden relationships to the others. However, the series was not continued.

== Characters ==
Akira Shirase (白瀬慧)
Voiced by: Nakai Kazuya
He is the main character of the story. Akira is a very talented computer connoisseur and is known in the hacking world as Battle Programmer Shirase (which is typically shortened to BPS). A genius in computer hacking and security who can do anything on any computer, or phone.
Misao Amano (天野美紗緒)
Voiced by: Fukuen Misato
Misao is Akira's great-niece. She is a very shy girl who loves to spend her time with Akira, whom she often refers to as onii-chan (お兄ちゃん). She cares for him deeply and it is very common to see her cooking for him or worrying about him. Sometimes, Misao says mau-mau (まうまう), which does not have an actual meaning (this may be a "cute" form of speech the creators added for her to please fans of cute anime girls). Misao looks very young for a 6th grader.
Misao Amano has made a cameo appearance in the final OVA of (Dual! Parallel Trouble Adventure) and is a main character in the series (Magical Girl Pretty Sammy) in which her alter ego is Pixy Misa.
Yoriko Yunoki (柚木頼子)
Voiced by: Fumiko Orikasa
Yoriko, nickname "Yon", is a child prodigy who works for the United States Navy. Her rank is Lieutenant Commander. She first meets BPS (Akira) when he is seen walking home after waiting in front of a book store. He explains that the book store clerk only opens when he wants to. She had been following Misao and asked if she could go to her house. She seems to have the same knowledge of computers as Akira and in one episode asks him to join her in the National Guard as her partner. She also asks him to go to America with her, and seems to have strong feelings for Akira as well.
Sae Motoki (本木紗英)
Voiced by: Yūko Nagashima
Sae is Misao's teacher. In an earlier episode she had tried to get Misao together with a boy from grade class. She is later seen drinking in an alley where she meets Akira, whom she has not seen since high school. She was being forced to have a marriage interview, and since she did not want to go she ended up getting drunk in the alley.

== Music ==
There are two theme songs used in the series. The opening theme (OP) is called "Suddenly" by Naomi Amagata. The closing theme (ED) is "Pure Enough" by Yuki Matsuura.

== Thanking the viewers ==
The final episode of the show made the unusual step of explicitly apologizing for ending the series, not only to the local Japanese viewers, but also those in the fansub community: It was addressed to "those who enjoy the show on TV, and to those outside the broadcast area who took special measures to watch the show on their PC monitors, and to everyone who watched it subtitled overseas without permission."
