= Golden Boy (manga) =

Japanese manga series

- First tankōbon volume cover, featuring Madame President and Kintaro Oe
- Genre: Erotic comedy
- Manga
- Written by: Tatsuya Egawa
- Published by: Shueisha
- Magazine: Super Jump
- Original run: 1992 – 1997
- Volumes: 10
- Original video animation
- Directed by: Hiroyuki Kitakubo
- Produced by: Yōichi Ishikawa; Takao Asaga; Kazufumi Nomura
- Written by: Tatsuya Egawa
- Music by: Jōyō Katayanagi
- Studio: A.P.P.P.
- Licensed by: NA: Discotek Media
- Released: October 27, 1995 – June 28, 1996
- Runtime: 183 minutes (total)
- Episodes: 6
- Manga

Golden Boy II
- Written by: Tatsuya Egawa
- Published by: Shueisha
- Magazine: Business Jump
- Original run: September 15, 2010 – May 18, 2011
- Volumes: 2
- icon

Golden Boy is a Japanese manga series written and illustrated by Tatsuya Egawa. It was serialized in Shueisha's seinen manga magazine Super Jump from 1992 to 1997, with its chapters later collected in ten bound volumes. The series follows Kintaro Oe, a 25 year old freeter and university dropout who roams Japan working various odd jobs. During his travels, Kintaro meets several women whose lives he dramatically changes, despite his invariably poor first impressions.

The series was adapted into a six-episode original video animation (OVA) produced by Shueisha and KSS that was released in 1995. A sequel to the manga, Golden Boy II, was serialized in Business Jump from September 2010 to May 2011.

== Plot ==
Kintaro is a freeter, and has done various jobs as he quests around Japan in pursuit of knowledge. His ventures include computer programming, housekeeping, teaching, the culinary arts, and most of all, studying. Kintaro is also often seen demonstrating the skills he has learned in previous chapters to overcome challenges faced in the current one. He is also adept in martial arts, but does not fight unless he is angered, and ordinarily just takes a beating. Much of the humor derives from situational elements, such as encounters between Kintaro and the women gone awry, and interactions between Kintaro's libido and imagination. Recurring gags include Kintaro's fetish for toilets (especially those recently used by beautiful women), his exaggerated facial expressions, and comical entries in his notebook. The notebook entries include explicit drawings of the women he encounters and bits of wisdom such as "'C' base is not sex", and "The human head cannot turn 360 degrees." Regarding the series, Tatsuya Egawa writes: "Before leaving kindergarten, I wrote these words in my notebook: 'I really like to study.' Often I wonder when it was that our schools forgot the true meaning of 'study', something which is now so often misunderstood by teachers and parents. Learning ought to be both stimulating and entertaining".

== Characters ==
Kintaro Oe (大江 錦太郎, Ōe Kintarō)
Voiced by: Mitsuo Iwata (Japanese); Doug Smith (English)
Madame President (女社長, Joshachō)
Voiced by: Hiromi Tsuru (Japanese); Tiffany Grant (English)
Naoko Katsuda (勝田 奈緒子, Katsuda Naoko)
Voiced by: Yūko Minaguchi (Japanese); Allison Keith (English)
Noriko (紀子)
Voiced by: Yuri Shiratori (Japanese); Kim Sevier (English)
Ayuko Hayami (速水 鮎子, Hayami Ayuko)
Voiced by: Kikuko Inoue (Japanese); Sue Ulu (English)
Reiko Terayama (寺山 麗子, Terayama Reiko)
Voiced by: Sakiko Tamagawa (Japanese); Laura Chapman (English)
Chie (知絵)
Voiced by: Mika Kanai (Japanese); Yvonne Aguirre (English)

== Media ==
=== Manga ===
Written and illustrated by Tatsuya Egawa, Golden Boy was serialized in Shueisha's seinen manga magazine Super Jump from 1992 to 1997. Shueisha collected its chapters in ten tankōbon volumes, released from June 4, 1993, to January 9, 1998. Egawa initially planned to conclude the manga after the Kongouji story arc, coinciding with the third volume. However, its popularity in Super Jump led the magazine's editorial department to insist that he continue the series. Egawa agreed on the condition that he be given creative freedom for the remainder of the series, but its popularity waned due to his shift in tone and focus. By 1997, the Super Jump editors informed Egawa that the manga was to be canceled, giving him just three more chapters to end the story. Angered by the sudden cancellation, Egawa concluded the story abruptly on a cliffhanger and provided an author's note alongside the final chapter stating that he would likely "never draw for Super Jump again."

A sequel to the manga, Golden Boy II – Sasurai no O-Benkyō Yarō: Geinō-kai Ōabare-hen (GOLDEN BOY II 〜さすらいのお勉強野郎 芸能界大暴れ編〜; Golden Boy II – The Wandering Student: Entertainment World Rampage Arc), was serialized in Business Jump from September 15, 2010, to May 18, 2011. Shueisha collected its chapters in two tankōbon volumes, released on February 18 and July 19, 2011.

==== Volumes ====
No.	Japanese release date	Japanese ISBN
1	June 4, 1993	4-08-858721-9
2	December 2, 1993	4-08-858722-7
3	May 10, 1994	4-08-858723-5
4	December 2, 1994	4-08-858724-3
5	June 2, 1995	4-08-858725-1
6	December 1, 1995	4-08-858726-X
7	June 4, 1996	4-08-858727-8
8	December 2, 1996	4-08-858728-6
9	July 4, 1997	4-08-858729-4
10	January 9, 1998	4-08-859001-5

=== Original video animation ===
Adapted by Shueisha and KSS into an original video animation (OVA) series, Golden Boy was first released in Japan on VHS and later on laserdisc. The closing theme is "Study A Go! Go!" by Golden Girls. The series was licensed in North America by ADV Films, and was released on VHS, in both subtitled and dubbed editions, later releasing two DVD volumes on April 23 and June 18, 2002, and a complete series release on May 25, 2004. The license was later transferred to Media Blasters for a DVD release on November 6, 2007, and then Discotek Media for a DVD release on November 6, 2012. In August 2025, Discotek Media announced that it will release the series on Blu-ray.

==== Episodes ====
No.	Title	Directed by	Original release date
1	"Computer Studies"; Transliteration: "Konpyūtā de obenkyō" (Japanese: コンピューターでお勉強)	Hiroyuki Kitakubo	October 27, 1995
25-year-old Kintarō Ōe obtains a janitorial job at an all-woman software firm led by the Ferrari-driving, skimpily clad Madame President. An electrical accident jeopardizes the firm's future, allowing Kintaro to put his newly acquired programming skills to the test.
2	"Temptation of the Maiden"; Transliteration: "Otome no yūwaku" (Japanese: 乙女の誘惑)	Yasuhito Kikuchi	November 22, 1995
Working as a campaign staffer for a mayoral candidate, Kintarō is asked to tutor his boss' attractive teenage daughter, Naoko Katsuda, who wants more from him than help with her math homework.
3	"Danger! The Virgin's First Love"; Transliteration: "Kiki! Otome no hatsukoi" (Japanese: 危機!乙女の初恋)	Hiroyuki Morita	December 22, 1995
A car accident has left the owner of an udon restaurant temporarily handicapped, and Kintarō is helping out and learning the trade. The owner's daughter, Noriko has a well-heeled suitor, but a series of events leads Kintarō to doubt his sincerity.
4	"Swimming in the Sea of Love"; Transliteration: "Yasei no umi o oyogu" (Japanese: 野性の海を泳ぐ)	Akihiko Nishiyama	April 26, 1996
Kintarō has challenged the local swimming coach (and former Olympic athlete) to a race, but he first needs to learn how to swim. While training, however, his situation with the coach, Ayuko Hayami is compromised.
5	"Balls to the Wall"; Transliteration: "Nōburēki no seishun" (Japanese: ノーブレーキの青春)	Kenji Takemura	May 24, 1996
Kintarō becomes a servant in a traditional-style mansion of a wealthy family, but is quickly dismissed. He then challenges the daughter Reiko Terayama, who abhors men and has a fetish for her motorcycle, to a race.
6	"Animation is Fun!"; Transliteration: "Animēshon wa omoshiroi!" (Japanese: アニメーションは面白い!)	Hiroyuki Kitakubo	June 28, 1996
Chie is a cel-painter at the animation studio where Kintaro works as an errand-boy. Production difficulties ensue, and Kintarō must rely on old friends to pull things through. An animated rendition of Tatsuya Egawa, voiced by the author himself, makes a cameo appearance in this episode.

== Reception ==
The Golden Boy OVA was generally well received by English-language reviewers. It is widely known for its mature content: while the OVA is not strictly a hentai animation, it does feature instances of partial female nudity, orgasms, and female masturbation. In contrast, the manga becomes almost pornographic starting in the second volume. Jeff Ulmer of DigitallyObsessed calls it "hilarious", and Luis Cruz of AnimeOnDVD says it is "surprisingly well-written for an erotic comedy," and that it "easily deserves the 'Essential' moniker bestowed upon it" by ADV. Cruz goes on to say that the series' jokes "feel like a natural extension of both the characters and the plot...". Mike Toole of AnimeJump says "the mixture of realistic storytelling with Kintaro's deranged personality is always a hoot to watch." Of Kintaro himself, Toole says he "has a simple everyman appeal", and Cruz contends that Kintaro's "charming character" is what makes the anime coherent. Toole says that Golden Boy "is worthwhile for the final episode alone", and Ulmer feels that it "took the cake". Golden Boy popularized anime in Russia after being a huge success on its MTV Russia.
