= Princess Minerva =

1994 video game

- Developer: Riverhillsoft
- Publishers: Riverhillsoft; Vic Tokai Corporation (SNES)
- Director: Kōji Ikemoto
- Producers: Rika Suzuki; Kazuhiro Okazaki
- Designer: Junji Shigematsu
- Artists: Ran Ishida; Fumio Matsumoto; Osamu Inoue
- Writer: Kō Maisaka
- Platforms: NEC PC-9801, PC Engine, Super Famicom
- Release: 1992 (PC-98); March 25, 1994 (PCE); June 23, 1995 (SNES)
- Genre: RPG

Princess Minerva (プリンセス・ミネルバ, Purinsesu Mineruba) is a role-playing video game developed and published by Riverhillsoft for the NEC PC-9801 in 1992 in Japan only. An original video animation by Group TAC was originally released by Toho in May 1995 in Japan; it was later released also in the United States. The extended franchise also includes a manga series, an illustrated serial novel, and other media.

== Development ==
Princess Minerva was developed by Riverhillsoft and published by Riverhillsoft and Vic Tokai Corporation for the NEC PC-9801, PC Engine and Super Famicom.

== Story ==
In the game, the evil sorceress Dynastar (ダイナスター) (voiced by Yōko Matsuoka) challenges Princess Minerva (voiced by Miki Itou), threatening to kidnap all the girls in the world and turn them into monsters. Minerva leaves with her eight personal female bodyguards to defeat Dynastar and her six also female demon generals. The game starts when all their weapons, armor and money gets stolen.

== Release ==
Princess Minerva was released in Japan for the PC Engine on March 25, 1994, and the Super Famicom on June 23, 1995.

A five-issue shounen manga series and a nine-volume illustrated serial novel were also released, written by the game's writer Maisaka Kou and published by ASCII comix and Shueisha, respectively, during the 1990s. An original soundtrack / drama CD compilation was released by Futureland in 1995. Other released included a regular original soundtrack and a CD collection of graphics.

In 2018, the Super Famicom version got a fan translation into the English language.

== Reception ==
Reception

Review score
Publication	Score
Famitsu	7/10, 4/10, 6/10, 4/10 (PC-E); 7/10, 5/10, 6/10, 5/10 (SF)

Reviewing the PC-Engine release, one reviewers said the game incorporates some interesting gameplay systems such as the differentiating parties. All four reviewers felt the loading time on the game was far too slow, with one reviewer saying it took up to three seconds for enemies to load. The other three reviewers found the RPG mechanics average and standard. Reviewing the Super Famicom version, one reviewer said the game lacked the audio and cut scenes of the PC-Engine version which was disappointing for a port. One reviewer said the graphics were inferior and that the story was monotonous and lacked depth.

Some reviewers of the game described it as a bishōjo game saying it was highly eroticized from the beginning of the game. One recommended it for cosplay enthusiasts while another said the game challenged how far a bishōjo game could be pursued on the Super Famicom. One reviewer of the PC-Engine version said they disliked this aspect, saying they do not like these character designs with huge eyes and breasts and that it was just not fun to control characters like this.

== Anime ==
- Princess Minerva

プリンセス・ミネルバ (Purinsesu Mineruba)
- Original video animation
- Directed by: Yoshihiro Yamaguchi
- Produced by: Masako Fukuyo; Hiroshi Kanemasa
- Written by: Hideki Sonoda
- Music by: Kenji Kawai
- Studio: Group TAC
- Licensed by: NA: ADV Films
- Released: May 1, 1995
- Runtime: 43 min

The original video animation Princess Minerva was produced by Group TAC was released by Toho in May 1995 in Japan. It was released by A.D. Vision in the United States in September 1995 and then again in 1998.

The OAV serves as a prequel to the game, telling how Minerva assembled her team of the most beautiful and powerful women warriors, and how she first run into Dynastar who tried to kidnap her and her friends.

Dave Halverson gave the anime version a rating of C. Chris Beveridge of Mania.com gave it a B−.

=== Cast ===
- Princess Minerva; Voiced by: Miki Itou (Japanese); Jessica Calvello (English)
- Blue Morris Rui Elmitage; Voiced by: Kikuko Inoue (Japanese); Kim Sevier (English)
- Whisler; Voiced by: Akio Ohtsuka (Japanese); Guil Lunde (English)
- Yurisis Cheloria; Voiced by: Atsuko Tanaka (Japanese); Marcy Rae (English)
- Tua; Voiced by: Junko Iwao (Japanese); Junie Hoang (English)
- Dynastar; Voiced by: Masako Katsuki (Japanese); Pam Rosenberger (English)
- Precission; Voiced by: Miki Nagasawa (Japanese); Meredith Dahl (English)
- Lakuroa Balbis; Voiced by: Rei Sakuma (Japanese); Toni Navarre (English)
- Kessley; Voiced by: Rica Matsumoto (Japanese); Laura Chapman (English)
- K-2; Voiced by: Rikako Aikawa (Japanese); Kurt Stoll (English)
- Orlin; Voiced by: Rio Natsuki (Japanese); Tiffany Grant (English)
- Linealter; Voiced by: Ryotaro Okiayu (Japanese); Steve Spurgat (English)
- Hagan; Voiced by: Seizō Katō (Japanese); Rob Mungle (English)
- Yamaha; Voiced by: Shinichiro Miki (Japanese); Bryan Bounds (English)
