= Sol Bianca: The Legacy =

1999 original video animation

- North American DVD cover

太陽の船 ソルビアンカ
- Genre: Science fiction, adventure
- Original video animation
- Directed by: Hiroyuki Ochi
- Written by: Hideki Mitsui
- Music by: Seikou Nagaoka
- Studio: AIC
- Licensed by: NA: Geneon USA
- Released: September 24, 1999 – May 25, 2000
- Episodes: 6

Sol Bianca: The Legacy (太陽の船 ソルビアンカ) is a Japanese OVA miniseries of six episodes loosely based on the OVA series Sol Bianca and employing computer generated animation. This version is a re-imagining of the ship and crew of Sol Bianca, and does not follow the continuity of the original (as well as leaving plot threads of the original show unresolved). Sol Bianca: The Legacy combines 3D graphics with 2D animation, particularly in rendering spaceships such as the Sol Bianca itself.

== Plot ==
Thousands of years into the future, mankind has colonized other planets across the galaxy and completely forgotten about Earth. On one part of the galaxy, the female space pirates and their colossal starship Sol Bianca get a surprise when a young girl named May stows away on board the ship. The crew then embarks on a journey to Earth to find the whereabouts of May's parents and discover the secrets of the lost planet.

== Characters ==
April Bikirk
Voiced by: Rika Matsumoto (Japanese); Wendee Lee (English)
Feb Fall
Voiced by: Yoshiko Sakakibara (Japanese); Melissa Williamson (English)
Janny Mann
Voiced by: Tomo Saeki (Japanese); Carol Stanzione (English)
June Ashel
Voiced by: Eri Miyajima (Japanese); Ellen Arden (English)
May Jessica
Voiced by: Hiroko Konishi (Japanese); Reba West (English)
Rammy
Voiced by: Jūrōta Kosugi (Japanese); David Lucas (English)

== Theme music ==
The English opening theme is "To Be Free" by Stella Furst. The closing themes are "You're Not Alone" by Kryie and "To Be Free" by Stella Furst.

== Novel ==
A novel was released on November 4, 1999, called The Ship of the Sun - Sol Bianca: Battleship of Ice (太陽の船ソルビアンカ 氷の戦艦, Taiyou no Fune Sorubianka Koori no Senkan) by ASCII of Kenji Obayashi illustrated for Naoyuki Onda. The book has 221 pages. The story starts 4 hundreds of years after humanity spread out into the galaxy. This is different from the thousands of years reference in the original Sol Bianca.
