= Sue Ulu =

American actress

- Occupation: Actress
- Years active: 1991–2004

Sue Ulu is an American voice and stage actress who, primarily, voiced in English dubs for anime properties licensed by ADV Films during the 1990s. Her most prominent roles include Ritsuko Akagi in Neon Genesis Evangelion and Kei in Dirty Pair Flash.

== Filmography ==
=== Anime ===
List of voice performances in anime
Year	Title	Role	Notes	Source
1994	Dirty Pair Flash series	Kei	3 OVAs	
1994	Blue Seed	Yaobikuni; additional voices	Ep. 16	
1995	Sorcerer Hunters	Big Momma		
1996	Neon Genesis Evangelion	Ritsuko Akagi	ADV dub, also Director's Cut in 2004	
1996	Golden Boy	Ayuko Hayami		
1996	Martian Successor Nadesico	unnamed character		
1996	Burn Up W	The Cyberbabe, Axia		
2000	Gasaraki	Secretary; additional voices		
2000	Spell Wars: Sorcerer Hunter's Revenge Vol. 1	Big Momma		
2002	Neon Genesis Evangelion: Death and Rebirth	Ritsuko Akagi		
2002	Neon Genesis Evangelion: The End of Evangelion	Ritsuko Akagi		

=== Films ===
List of performances in films
Year	Title	Role	Notes	Source
1997	Gamera: Guardian of the Universe	Female News Reporter 1; additional voices	live-action dub	
