= Kimera (manga) =

Japanese manga series and its adaptation

- Cover of the first manga volume

キメラ
- Genre: Horror, Supernatural, Yaoi
- Manga
- Written by: Kazuma Kodaka
- Published by: Libre
- English publisher: NA: ADV Manga
- Magazine: Magazine ZERO
- Original run: 1995 – 1996
- Volumes: 2
- Original video animation

Kimera
- Directed by: Kazu Yokota
- Produced by: Masamichi Fujiwara; Yutaka Takahashi
- Written by: Kenichi Kanemaki
- Music by: SENSATION
- Studio: Artland
- Licensed by: ADV Films
- Released: July 31, 1996
- Runtime: 48 minutes
- icon

Kimera (キメラ; lit. "Chimera"), stylized as Ki*Me*Ra, is a two-volume manga series written and illustrated by Kazuma Kodaka and serialized in Magazine ZERO. It was adapted into a single episode original video animation by Toho in 1996. Both the manga and OVA were licensed and released in English by ADV Films. It focuses on a man named Osamu, who falls in love with an androgynous vampire-like man named Kimera, being held by the Air Force and hunted by two other vampires. One vampire wishes to use Kimera for their hermaphroditic nature as the mother to revive their dying race, while another wishes to kill Kimera to save them from a fate Kimera did not want.

== Plot (OVA) ==
A mysterious space vehicle crash lands in the United States, witnessed by a middle-aged man and his dog. He investigates, but red tentacles emerge from a deformed humanoid wearing a large cloak and drain the dog of its fluids then attack him as well. Meanwhile, two cereal salesmen, Osamu, a foreigner from Japan and his best friend Jay, are driving along when they come upon an accident scene. They are ordered by the Air Force to leave, but they are attacked by vampiric creatures. Osamu is blown into a trailer where he finds a beautiful, green-haired androgynous-looking figure with striking heterochromia inside a cryogenic container labelled "Kimera". When a silver bell Osamu wears around his neck rings, it awakens the creature and they kiss from either side of the glass. Two vampire-like creatures arrive, and a long ebony-haired male attacks Osamu while a disfigured one defends him. They both disappear, and Osamu and Jay are taken to the Air Force base. They are later freed by Jay's father, Dr. Gibson, who is a member of the research team there. When Gibson is called away, Osamu grabs his security card and begins to search for Kimera with Jay in tow.

Meanwhile, the ebony-haired male vampire, Kianu, goes through the facility killing people in search of Kimera, using a bracelet which sounds similar to Osamu's bell. One of the research team, Dr. Fender, is concealing and feeding the deformed vampire, Ginzu, and discusses with him the status of the "Mother" system. Osamu finds and frees Kimera from the cryogenic container in a garden, who passionately kisses him on the lips. Kianu attacks them again, but Ginzu breaks into the facility to attack Kianu. Kimera begins glowing and causes an explosion, after which Kimera and Osamu disappear. Jay's father explains to him that Kimera is a vampiric alien with fully functional male and female reproductive organs and was in one of three capsules which arrived on Earth.

Kimera appears in the city and two men from an arcade take Kimera to a hotel and begin to have sex. However, the alien drains them of their blood, leaving lifeless husks. Because of Kimera's kiss, Osamu sees Kimera's past in a dream and learns that Kimera and Kianu once lived together, but Kimera refused to drink blood and become "a mother" after seeing what the consequences were. Kimera returns to Osamu and begins to make love but he tries to convince her that he is not Kianu. Ginzu arrives and captures Kimera and has Fender install her in the Mother system, hoping to create at least two or three children before Kimera dies. He explains that vampires on their planet are dying out as they are no longer able to reproduce. Kimera is the only one who can reproduce as neither Ginzu nor Kianu are fully functional men.

Kianu attacks the facility again and while he and Ginzu fight, Fender connects Kimera to the system after which Ginzu kills him as his services are no longer needed. Kianu is wounded and unable to free Kimera himself after a fatal battle with Ginzu, so he transports Osamu away, instructing him to kill Kimera. Later, Osamu is seen traveling with Kimera across a desert landscape, and though he knows that their child may destroy the world, he is just happy to be with Kimera.

== Characters ==
Osamu (修)
Voiced by: Yasunori Matsumoto (Japanese); Brett Weaver (English)
Kimera (キメラ)
Voiced by: Nobuo Tobita (Japanese); Kim Sevier (English)
Jay Gibson (カケス・ギブソン, Jei Gibuson)
Voiced by: Ryotaro Okiayu (Japanese); Tristan MacAvery (English)
Kianu (紀伊ユー)
Voiced by: Juurouta Kosugi (Japanese); Bryan Bounds (English)
Ginzu (ジン動)
Voiced by: Mugihito (Japanese); Guil Lunde (English)
Dr. Gibson (ギブソン, Gibuson-sensei)
Voiced by: Kinryuu Arimoto (Japanese); Robert Peeples (English)

== Reception ==
The general reception to the OVA adaption was largely unfavorable, due to lack of proper story and character development, and differences from the original manga. Viewers have expressed ill response to Kimera's hermaphrodite features, thinking her to be male rather than female. In the original version in Japan, Kimera actually is a man. This confusion may be the result of translation discrepancies due to gender neutral pronouns in the Japanese language, and the attempt to appeal to a larger market beyond the originally intended shounen-ai audience.

The art for the manga has been described as reminiscent of Yuu Watase.
