= Tarako =

Japanese actress and singer (1960–2024)

- Tarako in 2015
- Born: Non-public; December 17, 1960; Edogawa Ward, Tokyo, Japan
- Died: March 4, 2024 (aged 63)
- Other name: Tara-chan (タラちゃん)
- Occupations: Actress; voice actress; singer; narrator
- Years active: 1981–2024
- Employer: Troubadour Musique Office
- Notable work: Chibi Maruko-chan as Momoko "Maruko" Sakura; Let's Go! Anpanman as Frankenrobo; Danganronpa as Monokuma; Magical Taruruto-kun as Taruruto; InuYasha as Kirara; Hunter × Hunter as Melody; Urusei Yatsura as Sugar

Tarako (たらこ, Tarako; December 17, 1960 – March 4, 2024) was a Japanese actress, voice actress, singer and narrator.

Her debut voice acting role was as a preschooler in Urusei Yatsura. She is most famously known as the original voice actress of Momoko "Maruko" Sakura, the titular character in the long-running television anime series Chibi Maruko-chan from its debut in 1990 until its conclusion in 1992 and its subsequent revival, which premiered in 1995 and continues to this day.

Other notable roles of hers are as Monokuma in the Danganronpa franchise from 2016 to 2024, Frakenrobo in the long running children's anime series Let's Go! Anpanman, Kirara in InuYasha, the titular character of Magical Taruruto-kun, Melody in Hunter × Hunter, and Altena in Noir.

She was employed by the talent management firm Troubadour Musique Office.

== Biography ==
=== Early life ===
Born in Japan in Edogawa Ward, Tokyo on December 17, 1960, and raised in Ōta, Gunma, everyone in her family loved music, with her older sister being a part of a choir.

As a child, she entered the Gekidan Nihon Jido theater troupe alongside her older sister. Ever since she was in the second or third grade of elementary school, she had been a member of the music club, and would play the recorder. In fourth grade, she performed a Junko Sakurada song in a local karaoke contest, but didn't end up winning.

In the fifth grade, she moved from Edogawa Ward to Gunma Prefecture. At that time, she was particularly fond of sports and would play tennis, table tennis, volleyball, badminton, and others.

In fifth grade, she took piano lessons for about a year and reached the Beyer level, occasionally performing on stage. During her time at Ota City Kuai Elementary School, she was a member of the boys and girls choir. From her days at Ota City Higashi Junior High School, she joined the basketball club and even served as its captain during her junior high school years.

She ended up quitting high school basketball because her mother got worried about her arriving home late, so then took up folk music. She already had owned a guitar and wrote her very first song during her first high school year. She independently managed and hosted music events at local venues and small halls. Around that time, she admired the television anime Lupin the Third and formed an anime club.

Thinking "I want to become an anime voice actress" and believing that "acting skills are necessary for that", she moved to Tokyo after graduating from Gunma Prefectural Ota Girls' High School and enrolled in the Acting and Voice Acting Department at the Tokyo Academy of Visual Arts, but ended up dropping out. During her student days, she was referred to as "Tara-chan" by a classmate because she acted, looked, and sounded similar to the Sazae-san character Tarao Fuguta, often referred to by the name Tara-chan. She made the nickname her stage name by adding "ko" at the end and romanized the name.

=== Career ===
In 1981, Tarako made her debut as a voice actress as a preschooler in the Urusei Yatsura television anime series. At the time, she couldn't make a living from just doing voice acting, so also worked in various part-time jobs.

While still in school, she got to sing at a pub where a friend of hers was working a part-time job. The president of the Troubadour Music Office, who was there as a customer and later signed her on, invited her, saying, "I'm producing a live show, want to be the opening act?", leading to her and the friend to perform together as a guitar duo. Troubadour's president and Urusei Yatsura sound director Shigeharu Shiba were acquaintances, she was invited with, "I want to audition people who aren't professional voice actors". She auditioned for the role of the female protagonist Lum, but failed the audition. However the staff took an immediate liking towards her distinct voice, so she appeared in nearly every episode in a supporting role.

In 1982, she got her first regular voice acting role as Chill in Combat Mecha Xabungle.

In 1983, she made her debut as a singer-songwriter with the LP album Totte Oki no Shunkan.

In 1990, she started voicing the titular character of Momoko "Maruko" Sakura in the Chibi Maruko-chan television anime series, which became her most popular and signature role. Initially a different actress was selected to voice Maruko, but a second auditioning was held because the actress didn't match the image that original creator Momoko Sakura had in mind. Tarako was chosen to voice Maruko because her voice sounded just like Sakura's. In addition, Tarako also served as a screenplay director for the anime and wrote scripts for several episodes. It has been said that people would often tell her that her voice and appearance resembled and sounded just like Sakura's.

She also worked as a variety show host and handled plenty of narration jobs. She was the head of the theater company WAKU, also writing, directing, and performing in numerous stage productions.

Being someone who was born in Gunma Prefecture, she served as the official guide for the Gunma Symphony Orchestra's summer vacation concert every year until her death.

In 2016, it was announced that she had been selected to replace Nobuyo Ōyama in the role of Monokuma for the Danganronpa franchise due to Ōyama suffering from dementia.

=== Death ===
Floral altar display for Tarako featuring her iconic voice roles at the TARA-chan Arigatou no Kai ~Taisetsu na Kimi he~ farewell gathering.

Around November 2023, Tarako was diagnosed with a serious illness for which she was immediately hospitalized. At the beginning of her stay in the hospital, she was still well enough to continue voice acting, but her condition gradually worsened to the point where she could no longer stand up and showed no signs of improvement.

Tarako died on March 4, 2024, at the age of 63. She had recorded her final lines for Chibi Maruko-chan in the days before her death.

The producers of Chibi Maruko-chan, as well as her talent agency Troubadour, Fuji Television and Nippon Animation announced her death to the public five days later on March 9, 2024. At the 18th Seiyu Awards, held on the same day as the announcement of her death, a 15 second long moment of silence was held at the beginning of the ceremony in honor of her and Dragon Ball creator Akira Toriyama, who died on March 1, in recognition of their contributions to the anime industry.

At the beginning of the March 10 broadcast of the Chibi Maruko-chan anime that year, a memorial message from the entire voice cast and staff of Chibi Maruko-chan was shown at the beginning. Days later on March 15, Megami no Marche, a show that she had served as the narrator for many years on, had a memorial tribute message for her shown at the beginning of that day's episode broadcast.

In the eulogy written by the staff of Chibi Maruko-chan, they said she had been eager to continue voicing Maruko even while in the hospital and continued through her illness with "great love" for her work. The following day, a message board was put up at the entrance to Chibi-Maruko Chan Land in Shizuoka for guests and fans to contribute messages of commemoration and thanks for her years of work.

The last episode Tarako recorded as Maruko aired as a one-hour special on March 24, 2024, on Fuji TV and other FNS stations. Following her death, Kokoro Kikuchi took over the role of Maruko in Chibi Maruko-chan after the show resumed with new episodes on April 21, 2024.

On June 15, 2024, a farewell gathering titled TARA-chan Arigatou no Kai ~Taisetsu na Kimi he~ was held, with Yusaku Yara, Bin Shimada, Machiko Toyoshima, Keaton Yamada (who retired from voice acting in March 2021), Kōichi Yamadera, Bakushō Mondai (Hikari Ōta, Yuji Tanaka), and Minoru Kihara being amongst those in attendance. Yamada and Hikara gave out eulogies as "words of graditude". Near the end, Shimada and Yara both left her messages as Maruko's grandfather and Maruko's father. At the end of the event, everyone who attended performed "Odoru Pompokolin", the opening theme song of Chibi Maruko-chan, in a chorus.

On December 17, 2024, on the Fuji Television network program Hoshi ni Natta Sutā Tachi, previously un-aired preview audio for the next episode recorded by Tarako before her death was used, marking her final performance as Maruko.

== Filmography ==
=== Animation ===
==== Television animation ====
List of voice performances in television animation
Year	Title	Role(s)	Notes	Source
1981–85	Urusei Yatsura	Preschooler, Sugar, Sakura's mother, Additional voices	Debut voice acting role	
1982–83	Combat Mecha Xabungle	Chill		
1982–83	Miss Machiko	Additional voices		
1983	Story of the Alps: My Annette	Pierre		
1983	Mrs. Pepper Pot	Chip, Don	Main roles	
1983	The Many Dream Journeys of Meme	Orville Wright (childhood)	Ep. 10	
1983–85	Tao Tao Ehonkan	Tao Tao	Lead role	
1983–84	Fushigi no Kuni no Alice	Alice	Lead role	
1983	Bemubemu Hunter Kotengumaru	Nina	Debuts in Ep. 16	
1984	Noozles	Mark, Louie, Cassowary Bird		
1985	Star Musketeer Bismark	Bena, Ron		
1985	Cat's Eye	Yuichi	Ep. 64	
1985	Lupin the 3rd Part III	Additional voice	Ep. 44	
1986	Maison Ikkoku	Boy A, Akemi, Asami	Boy A in Ep. 11, Akemi in Ep. 93	
1986	Ganbare, Kickers!	Taichi Ōta	Main role	
1988	Mami the Psychic	Tennis Club Member	Debuts in Ep. 47	
1988	The Three Musketeers	Andre	Ep. 17	
1988	Bigger and Better: Dommel & Ron	Bob Lovely	Main role	
1988	Bikkuriman	Yoisuke, Jikeseen		
1989–90	Patlabor the Mobile Police on Television	Tamiko Shinshi	Debuts in Ep. 2	
1989–90	The New Adventures of Kimba The White Lion	Additional voices, Lulu	Lulu in Ep. 38	
1990–92	Chibi Maruko-chan	Momoko "Maruko" Sakura	Lead role	
1990	Sally the Witch 2	Penguin, Chun	Penguin in Ep. 12, Chun in Ep. 31	
1990–2023	Let's Go! Anpanman	Little Cupid, Frankenrobo	First voice	
1990–91	NG Knight Ramune & 40	Heavy Meta-Ko	Debuts in Ep. 2	
1990	Delightful Moomin Family	Martian Child, Mesomeso	Martian Child in Ep. 16, Mesomeso in Ep. 23	
1990–92	Magical Taruruto-kun	Taruruto	Lead role	
1992	Dragon Ball Z	Tama	Debuted in Ep. 123	
1992–93	Mikan Enikki	Mikan Kusanagi	Lead role	
1994	Tama of Third Street: Have You Seen My Tama?	Navi	Appears in "Futari no Nora"	
1994	Cooking Papa	Ako		
1995–2024	Chibi Maruko-chan	Momoko "Maruko" Sakura	Lead role; First voice	
1996	VS Knight Ramune & 40 Fire	Heavy Meta-Ko		
1997–99	Sakura Momoko Theater Coji-Coji	Suzie		
1998	Kindaichi Case Files	Asuka Minatoya	Debuted in Ep. 56	
2000–01	Hunter × Hunter	Melody		
2001	Noir	Altena		
2001–02	Tantei Shōnen Kageman	Kageman		
2002	Kasumin	Straw Doll	Ep. 18	
2003	Astro Boy	Shiowamu	Ep. 1	
2003–04	Pluster World	Maurie	Main role	
2005–06	Mushiking: The King of Beetles	Chibi King	Lead role	
2006	Majime ni Fumajime: Kaiketsu Zorori	Kaiju-ko	Ep. 73	
2011	Nichijou - My Ordinary Life	Plus-screw, Narration	Ep. 16	
2013	Minna Daisuki Sorajiro	Sorajiro		
2016	Danganronpa 3: The End of Hope's Peak High School	Monokuma		
2023–26	Trigun Stampede	Zazie the Beast	First voice	
2023	Urusei Yatsura	Wishing Star	Ep. 17	
2024	Kaiju No. 8	Mysterious Young Beast		

==== Theatrical animation ====
List of voice performances in theatrical animation
Year	Title	Role(s)	Notes	Source
1983	Xabungle Graffiti	Chill		
1984	Urusei Yatsura 2: Beautiful Dreamer	Additional voice		
1984	Nausicaä of the Valley of the Wind	Boy		
1986	Castle in the Sky	Madge		
1986	They Were 11!	Toto		
1988	My Neighbor Totoro	Friend B		
1990	Let's Go! Anpanman: Omusubiman	Crab Shumai	Short film	
1990	Chibi Maruko-chan	Momoko "Maruko" Sakura		
1991	Magical Taruruto-kun	Taruruto		
1991	Magical Taruruto-kun: Burn! The Magic Battle of Friendship	Taruruto		
1992	Magical Taruruto-kun: My Favorite Takoyaki	Taruruto		
1992	Chibi Maruko-chan: My Favorite Song	Momoko "Maruko" Sakura		
1993	Let's Go! Anpanman: Nosshi the Dinosaur's Big Adventure	Nosshi		
2006	We Are PreCure Splash☆Star Tic-Tac Crisis Hanging by a Thin Thread!	Minute		
2009	Yona Yona Penguin	Chabisuke the Cat		
2015	Chibi Maruko-chan: A Boy from Italy	Momoko "Maruko" Sakura		
2018	Engimon	Haruo		
2024	Dead Dead Demon's Dededede Destruction	Debeko	Posthumous release	

==== Original video animation (OVA) ====
List of voice performances in original video animation
Year	Title	Role(s)	Source
1986	Girl Detective Club	Midori Ichinotani	
1987	Twilight Q: Time Knot - Reflection	Additional voice	
1988	Patlabor: The Early Days	Tamiko Shinshi	
1988	Maison Ikkoku - Highlights: Through the Passing Seasons	Asami	
1990	Noobow: The Vanished Medal	Noobow	
1990	Sengoku Bushō Retsuden Bakufū Dōji Hissatsuman	BuJo	
1991	NG Kishi Ramune & 40 EX	Hebimetako	
1993	NG Kishi Ramune & 40 DX	Hebimetako	
1995	It's the 10th Anniversary! Chibi Maruko-chan	Momoko "Maruko" Sakura	
2001	We're The Pichu Brothers: Balloon Disturbance	Narration	
2002	Hunter × Hunter: Original Video Animation	Melody	
2003	Hunter × Hunter: Greed Island	Melody	
2004	Hunter × Hunter: G.I. Final	Melody	
2008	Takashi Yanase's Märchen Theater: Hippo-san	Hippo-san	
2008	Urusei Yatsura: The Obstacle Course Swim Meet	Sugar	
2015	Planetarium Chibi Maruko-chan: Wish Upon a Star	Momoko "Maruko" Sakura	
2016	Monokuma Theater: ~Future Zap Recommendation~	Monokuma	
2018	The World of Classical Chinese Poetry and Literature (Anime)	Narration	
2019	Planetarium Chibi Maruko-chan: And Yet the Earth Moves	Momoko "Maruko" Sakura	

==== Original net animation (ONA) ====
List of voice performances in original net animation
Year	Title	Role(s)	Source
2006	Pokémon Mystery Dungeon: Setting Out! Pokémon Rescue Team Ganbarus!	Medicham	

=== Commercials ===
- Seiko Epson Colorio (Narration)

=== Drama CDs ===
- Eiyū Densetsu III: Shiroki Majo "Wakatareta Mizuumi" (Ban Ban)
- Kaze no Densetsu Xanadu II: Heroine-tachi no Tanjōbi (Kururu)
- Popful Mail Paradise 4–5 (Nairu)
- Tarako Pappara Paradise (Tarako-neesan, Kururu, Nairu, Ban Ban, Obāsan

=== Live action ===
==== Films ====
- Tsuribaka Nisshi 3

=== Video games ===
- 2nd Super Robot Wars Z: Hakai-Hen (Chill)
- Chibi Maruko-chan: Maruko Deluxe Quiz (Momoko "Maruko" Sakura)
- Chibi Maruko-chan: Mezase! Minami no Island!! (Momoko "Maruko" Sakura)
- Chibi Maruko-chan no Taisen Puzzle Dama (Momoko "Maruko" Sakura)
- Chibi Maruko-chan: Maruko Enikki World (Momoko "Maruko" Sakura)
- Chibi Maruko-chan DS Maru-chan no Machi (Momoko "Maruko" Sakura)
- Cotton: Fantastic Night Dreams (PC Engine version) (Nata de Cotton)
- Danganronpa V3: Killing Harmony (Monokuma)
- Inuyasha (Kirara)
- Magical★Taruruto-kun (Mega Drive game) (Taruruto, listed as Taluluto)
- Momotarō Dōchūki (Chibi Bonbī)
- One Piece: Unlimited World Red (Pato)
- Sakura Momoko Gekijō Koji Koji (Sūjī)
- Super Bomberman: Panic Bomber W
- Super Robot Wars Alpha Gaiden (Chill)
- Super Robot Wars NEO (Hebimetako)
- Super Robot Wars OE: Operation Extend (Hebimetako)
- Super Robot Wars Z (Chill)
- Tail Concerto (Panta)
- Zero Escape: Virtue's Last Reward (Zero III)

=== Radio ===
- Tarako Falcom Pīhyarara

=== Other voiceover ===
Fuji TV

- The Judge! Tokusuru Hōritsu File "Korette Tsumi Janai no" segment (Narration)
- Naruhodo! The World (Reporter)
- Quiz & Game Tarō to Hanako (Host)

NHK Educational

- Okome (Narration)

TBS

- Shiawase Kazoku Keikaku (Narration)

TV Asahi

- Zenigata Kintarō (Narration)

Other

- Chibi Maruko-chan (Screenplay director)
- Noozles (Theme song performance)

== Discography ==
Listed chronologically.

=== Albums ===
- Totte Oki no Shunkan (1983)
- Kaze ga Chigau (1984)
- Warawanai Koibito (1985)
- Kokuhaku (1985)
- Sukoshi Dake Ai ga Tarinai (1986)
- Anata ga Daisuki (1990)
- Kanojo (1991)
- My dear (1991)
- Tengoku yori Takai Toko Ikō yo (1993)
- Wāi. (1995)
