= Naoko Watanabe (actress) =

Japanese actress

- 渡辺 奈緒子
- Born: July 30, 1984 (age 42); Kanagawa Prefecture, Japan
- Occupations: Actress; model
- Years active: 2000–present
- Height: 164 cm (5 ft 5 in)

Naoko Watanabe (渡辺 奈緒子, Watanabe Naoko; born July 30, 1984) is a Japanese actress and model from Kanagawa Prefecture, Japan.

== Career ==
Watanabe made her film debut in Tatsuya Egawa manga-based movie Tokyo University Story in February 2006 and the next year, in September 2007, she had a brief nude scene in the film Silk.

In September 2009, Shinchosha Publishing released a photobook in "mook" (magazine/book) format Monthly Naoko Watanabe (Shincho Mook 121) (月刊渡辺奈緒子 (SHINCHO MOOK 121)) featuring Watanabe.

Watanabe also appeared in the TBS TV series Yakuza Panther Shin Akira (クロヒョウ 龍が如く 新章), based on the Sega game for the PlayStation Portable (PSP), which began airing in May 2010.

She had only a small role in the 2008 parallel worlds thriller Riaru Onigokko (also known as The Chasing Game) but a much larger one as a nurse/woman warrior in the June 2010 sequel Riaru Onigokko 2.

In May 2010, it was announced that Watanabe would have her first starring role in the movie adaptation of AV idol Mihiro's autobiographical work Nude. The movie, directed by Yuichi Onuma, started shooting in May and was released in September 2010. Watanabe met with Mihiro about the role and revealed that she watched some of her videos to study the character — to which Mihiro replied that it was “very embarrassing”. Later that year, Watanabe was one of the regular stars of the Yakuza drama TV series Kurohyō: Ryu ga gotoku shinshō (クロヒョウ 龍が如く 新章) broadcast October 5 to December 21, 2010 on TBS. She also had a recurring role in the Mainichi Broadcasting System (MBS) suspense drama Quartet (カルテット) which aired January to March 2011.

Watanabe created a stir when she released a nude photobook titled Dawn (黎明, Reimei), published by Wani Books (ワニブックス) in February 2012, with photos taken by Japanese fashion photographer Leslie Kee (レスリー・キー). In May 2014, Watanabe starred as aspiring rock singer Kanna in the Eiji Uchida directed Dead Banging (メタルカ METALCA), a comedy horror film about an all-female band and a metal-head zombie. The film also featured real Japanese rock band Gacharic Spin. She also had a supporting role in another Eiji Uchida horror comedy Grateful Dead (グレイトフルデッド, Gureitofurudeddo) in November 2014.

== Filmography ==
Sources:

- Tokyo University Story (東京大学物語, Tōkyō Daigaku Monogatari), February 2006
- Noriko's Dinner Table (紀子の食卓, Noriko No Shokutaku), September 2006
- Silk, September 2007
- Riaru Onigokko (リアル鬼ごっこ), February 2008
- Shaolin Girl (少林少女, Shōrin Shōjo), April 2008
- Ueshima Jēn (上島ジェーン), May 2009
- Outrage (アウトレイジ, Autoreiji), June 2010
- Riaru Onigokko 2 (リアル鬼ごっこ２), June 2010
- nude, September 2010
- Strangers in the City (行きずりの街, Yukizuri no Machi), November 2010
- An Assassin (An Assassin アサシン), October 2011
- Dead Banging (メタルカ METALCA), May 2014
- Grateful Dead (グレイトフルデッド, Gureitofurudeddo), November 2014
- Lost in Wrestling (2015)
