= Yume Ippai =

1990 single by Yumiko Seki

Yume Ippai (ゆめいっぱい, "Full of Dreams") is a song performed by Yumiko Arima as her debut single and was released on April 21, 1990.

== Creators ==
The lyrics were written by Tomoko Aran and the melody was composed by Tetsuro Oda.

== Use in media ==
It was used as the first opening theme of the anime series Chibi Maruko-chan from January 7, 1990, to September 27, 1992. "Yume Ippai" was the only song that Momoko Sakura did not write lyrics for in the anime series. The song was used once again on December 15, 1990, as the ending soundtrack for Chibi Maruko-chan: The Movie.

== Reception ==
At its peak, the song placed 50th on the Oricon Singles charts during the 1990s. After the death of Sakura Momoko in 2018, "Yume Ippai" rose to 132nd place on the chart that week.

== Album ==
1. "Yume Ippai" ("Full of Dreams") Lyrics: Aran Tomoko, Composition: Tetsuro Oda
2. "Mou Oyasuminasai" (I'll Say Good Night Again") Composition: Yumiko Seki

== Covers ==
- In 1990, B. B. Queens, which sang "Odoru Ponpokorin", covered "Yume Ippai" for their album's B-side
- Golden Bombers, which also covered "Odoru Ponpokorin" for the anime series Chibi Maruko-chan in 2016, also sang "Yume Ippai" for their B-side
- On Mother's Day 2020, Rakuten released a commercial covering the song. In an interview, Yumiko (Seki) Arima sang "Yume Ippai" for the first time in 29 years. The song was featured in the opening car radio scene, and served as the primary music of the commercial.
- Hiroko Moriguchi covered the song on her 2024 album Anison Covers 2.
