= Chibi Maruko-chan: A Boy from Italy =

- Theatrical release poster

Japanese name
- Kanji: 映画ちびまる子ちゃん イタリアから来た少年
- Literal meaning: Chibi Maruko-chan: The movie – A boy from Italy
Transcriptions
- Revised Hepburn: Eiga Chibi Maruko-chan: Itaria kara Kita Shōnen
- Directed by: Jun Takagi
- Screenplay by: Momoko Sakura
- Based on: Chibi Maruko-chan by Momoko Sakura
- Music by: Nobuyuki Nakamura
- Production company: Nippon Animation
- Distributed by: Toho
- Release date: December 23, 2015 (Japan)
- Running time: 94 minutes(or 95 minutes)
- Country: Japan
- Language: Japanese
- Box office: US$5.4 million (Japan); CN¥25.9 million (China)

Chibi Maruko-chan: A Boy From Italy (映画ちびまる子ちゃん イタリアから来た少年, Eiga Chibi Maruko-chan: Itaria kara Kita Shōnen) is a 2015 Japanese animated family comedy film directed by Jun Takagi, produced by Nippon Animation and based on the manga series Chibi Maruko-chan written and illustrated by Momoko Sakura. It was released in Japan by Toho on December 23, 2015.

== Cast ==
- Tarako as Momoko "Maruko" Sakura
- Yusaku Yara as Hiroshi Sakura
- Teiyū Ichiryūsai as Sumire Sakura
- Yūko Mizutani as Sakiko Sakura
- Bin Shimada as Tomozō Sakura
- Yūko Sasaki as Kotake Sakura
- Nobuo Tobita as Sueo Maruo
- Masami Kikuchi as Kazuhiko Hanawa
- Naoko Watanabe as Tamae "Tama" Honami
- Tomoko Naka as Shigeru Fujiki
- Taishi Nakagawa as Andrea
- Hitori Gekidan as Singh
- Papaya Suzuki as Nepu
- Naomi Watanabe as Julia
- Rola as Sin-yee

== Reception ==
The film was sixth-placed at the Japanese box office on its opening weekend, in both admissions and gross, with US$447,069. On its second weekend it remained in sixth place by admissions, on the third weekend it dropped to tenth place by admissions and on the fourth weekend it was twelfth-placed by gross, with US$280,022. As of January 17, 2016, the film has grossed US$5.38 million in Japan.

The film was released in China on September 23, 2016, where it grossed CN¥25.9 million so far.
