= Magical Taruruto-kun (Mega Drive video game) =

1992 video game

Magical★Taruruto-kun
- Developer: Game Freak
- Publisher: Sega
- Director: Ken Sugimori
- Producer: Satoshi Tajiri
- Programmer: Yuji Shingai
- Artists: Ken Sugimori; Akihito Tomisawa; Kazuyo Ishiai; Katsuki Maruyama
- Composer: Junichi Masuda
- Series: Magical Taruruto-kun
- Platform: Mega Drive
- Release: JP: April 24, 1992
- Genre: Platform
- Mode: Single-player

Magical★Taruruto-kun (Note: Japanese: まじかる☆タルるートくん, Hepburn: Majikaru Tarurūto-kun) is a 1992 Japanese platform game developed by Game Freak and published by Sega for the Mega Drive. Based on Tatsuya Egawa's manga and anime of the same name, it is the fifth game in the series and the only one to be released on the Mega Drive. This game would later be included in the lineup for the Japanese version of the Mega Drive Mini 2 in 2022 and would receive an unofficial English translation patch the following year.

== Plot ==
One morning, while racing to Nanno Elementary School, Honmaru Edojo and Taruruto (Note: Taruruto is listed in the staff roll as Taluluto. During this time, the series' title and by extension, the title character, frequently alternated between using Rs and Ls in the name, resulting in the title shifting from Magical Taruruto-kun to Magical Taluluto-kun, particularly during the airing of the Toei anime.) meet up with their classmate Iyona Kawai, when in the blink of an eye, a mysterious light disturbs the school, and the three notice that none of their classmates are anywhere to be found. At the same time, hordes of monsters started invading the school out of nowhere, and both Taruruto and Honmaru decide to investigate and see who's behind all of this trouble.

== Gameplay ==
Like the previous video games in the series, Magical★Taruruto-kun is a 2D side-scrolling platform game. Unlike most of the Bandai-published games, which have Taruruto use his tongue to attack his enemies, he uses his magic pen, known as "Sword Pen Magic-kun", as his main method of attacking. This pen makes objects sentient, which allows him to pick them up and throw them at enemies, sometimes even having an additional power that Taruruto can use to his advantage, such as a projectile. By jumping and holding down the jump button again, Taruruto can use his wings to glide through a short distance, but he can only glide in one direction.

The game is divided into four stages, each with different sub-levels varying in length. Some stages have mini-bosses (Tsutomu Harako in stages 1 and 4, Hashu Mikotaka in stage 2, and Count Racul in stage 3) while a main boss character will always appear at the end of a stage (Jabao Jaba in stage 1, Mimora in stage 2, Great King Dowahha in stage 3, and finally Rivar (Note: While his name is listed in the staff roll as Raivar, the level select refers to him as Rivar, which would also be used in the manga's 2020 English translation.) in stage 4).

Through the course of the game, Taruruto will also be able to gain additional magic abilities that can be used through collecting pentagram seals, which will be reduced by one upon usage. The "Sukerururu~" spell will grant Taruruto invincibility for a short length of time. The "Mi~Mo~Ra~" spell will summon Taruruto's friend Mimora, who will proceed to perform her signature punch on nearby enemies. Lastly is the "Matsuputatsu!!" (Split in two) spell that will deal double the damage on enemies.

In several stages, many of Taruruto's friends are hidden in secret rooms throughout the game. His closest friends, Honmaru and Iyona, are always the first friends he encounters throughout his adventure. All of these characters will appear on the staff roll at the end of the game alongside four of the boss characters (Jabao, Mimora, Harako, and Rivar) if they are located.

== Development ==
In an interview in the artbook "Ken Sugimori Works", game director Ken Sugimori mentioned that Game Freak was approached by Sega with a choice to create one of three games for the Mega Drive. These options included a Phantasy Star game, a game meant to be a fast-food tie-in using that chain's character (which possibly became Treasure's McDonald's Treasure Land Adventure), and a tie-in game based on the Magical★Taruruto-kun anime. Feeling bothered by much of the licensed games of the time, he directed this one with the goal of making the game wholly faithful to the series while keeping any original enemy characters as close to the atmosphere as possible. He used several items and elements from the manga and anime, and even went as far as to use voice actors Tarako (Taruruto) and Kumiko Nishihara (Mimora) for voice samples of the characters they portray in the television anime.

Akihito Tomisawa stated that rather than using Sega's popular Sonic The Hedgehog as a reference, the game took inspiration from Castle of Illusion Starring Mickey Mouse, specifically with the game's fluid movements and animations. However, he mentioned that the character of Dr. Eggman had left a strong impression on him because of how his attack patterns were different each time he appeared.

== Release ==
Magical★Taruruto-kun was first released in Japan on April 24, 1992. It would later be re-released as a part of the roster of games available for the Mega Drive Mini 2 on October 27, 2022.

== Reception ==
Reception

Review scores
Publication	Score
Beep! MegaDrive	8/10
Famitsu	26/40
Sega Pro	36%
GameFan	89%
Sega Saturn Magazine (Japan)	89%
Mega Drive Advanced Gaming	77%

Reviews for this game were generally favorable overall, with critics highlighting the vibrant visuals as a high mark of the game, but criticizing the game's length and difficulty spike. In its final review corner for Mega Drive games, the Japanese Sega Saturn Magazine would rank the game 142 out of 300 Mega Drive titles listed with a ranking of 7.917. One notable review from the British magazine, Sega Pro, criticized the game for how easily repetitive and boring it becomes after a while, though still recommended it for younger players.
