= Sakura Momoko no Ukiuki Carnival =

2002 video game

- Japanese box art
- Developers: Nintendo NSD indieszero
- Publisher: Nintendo
- Director: Toru Osawa
- Producers: Shigeru Miyamoto; Satoshi Yamato
- Designers: Momoko Sakura; Noriko Miura
- Composer: Akira Fujiwara
- Platform: Game Boy Advance
- Release: JP: July 5, 2002
- Genre: Role-playing
- Modes: Single-player, multiplayer

Sakura Momoko no Ukiuki Carnival (さくらももこのウキウキカーニバル, Momoko Sakura's Ukiuki Carnival) is a 2002 role-playing video game developed by Nintendo and indieszero and published by Nintendo for the Game Boy Advance. The game was never released outside Japan.

The game is billed as an "internet simulation game" (インターネットごっこ, intānetto gokko) where the player ventures between the game's "real-life" town and internet. The game was originally planned for the Game Boy Color, but was switched to the Game Boy Advance.

The game's characters were designed by manga artist Momoko Sakura, best known for writing Chibi Maruko-chan. Her sister, Noriko Miura, designed the basis for the game and contributed to its script, while Shigeru Miyamoto, Takashi Tezuka, and Satoru Iwata also contributed to the game's development as producers or advisors.

== Gameplay ==
Screenshot of Sakura Momoko no Ukiuki Carnival. The player's character (right) is handing the other character a flyer inviting them to the carnival.

The player takes the role of a young boy or girl who is on the "carnival committee" of Colortown; a mysterious town where there is no nightfall. The player ventures through the game's overworld in top-down perspective to fulfill two objectives: receive a star from each of the eight guardian gods living in the town to inaugurate the town's festive carnival, and invite as many people as possible to the carnival. The final goal of the game is to invite all 100+ characters of the game to the carnival, but only a portion of the characters can be invited during the first playthrough. Completion of the final goal requires at least three playthroughs of the game.

In preparing for the carnival, the player is faced with various puzzles or mysteries present within the town. The player can meet with local residents directly to receive items useful in solving the puzzles, or access the game's simulated internet using a PDA. Relevant information can be gained through the web pages, emails, forums, chat rooms, and search engines simulated within the game. None of the puzzles and mysteries are difficult to solve, and few puzzles are presented during the first playthrough, allowing the player to get through to the carnival fairly easily. A fair portion of the game is spent as a tutorial, where the player learns the controls from supporting characters, and the game's dialogue and colorful style is directed towards casual gamers and young children.

The game also includes a mode where the player can create their own homepage viewable on the game's internet. The player can design an original homepage by entering text and using preset icons and wallpaper. A homepage designed by Sakura Momoko and her sister is included as an example. This homepage can be exchanged between cartridges via the Game Boy Advance Game Link Cable, and can serve as a communication tool similar to an exchange diary.

== See also ==
- Momoko Sakura
