= Magical Taruruto =

Japanese manga series

- First tankōbon volume cover

まじかる☆タルるートくん (Majikaru Tarurūto-kun)
- Genre: Fantasy comedy
- Manga
- Written by: Tatsuya Egawa
- Published by: Shueisha
- English publisher: NA: Manga Planet (digital); Crunchyroll Manga (digital)
- Imprint: Jump Comics
- Magazine: Weekly Shōnen Jump
- Original run: November 14, 1988 – September 21, 1992
- Volumes: 21
Further information
Anime television series
Magical Taluluto
Directed by	Masahiko Ohkura
Written by	Yoshiyuki Suga
Music by	Seiji Yokoyama
Studio	Toei Animation
Original network	ANN (ABC, TV Asahi)
Original run	September 2, 1990 – May 10, 1992
Episodes	87
Anime film
Directed by	Shigeyasu Yamauchi
Written by	Yoshiyuki Suga
Music by	Seiji Yokoyama
Studio	Toei Animation
Released	March 9, 1991
Runtime	45 minutes
Anime film
Magical Taluluto: Burn! The Magic Battle of Friendship
Directed by	Hiroyuki Kakudou
Written by	Yoshiyuki Suga
Music by	Seiji Yokoyama
Studio	Toei Animation
Released	July 20, 1991
Runtime	45 minutes
Anime film
Magical Taluluto: My Favorite Takoyaki
Directed by	Yukio Kaizawa
Written by	Yoshiyuki Suga
Music by	Seiji Yokoyama
Studio	Toei Animation
Released	March 7, 1992
Runtime	45 minutes
- icon

Magical Taruruto (Japanese: まじかる☆タルるートくん, Hepburn: Majikaru Tarurūto-kun), also known as Magical Taluluto, (Note: The series is known as Magical Taruruto-kun in Japan. Magical Taluluto is the title used worldwide by Toei Animation and Magical Taruruto was used by Manga Planet for its English release.) is a Japanese manga series written and illustrated by Tatsuya Egawa. It was serialized in Shueisha's shōnen manga magazine Weekly Shōnen Jump from November 1988 to September 1992, with its chapters collected in 21 tankōbon volumes. The manga was published digitally in North America by Manga Planet in 2020.

An 87-episode anime television series adaptation animated by Toei Animation, was broadcast on TV Asahi from September 1990 to May 1992. Three feature anime films along with several video games based on the anime were released from 1991 to 1992.

By November 2020, the manga had over 12.6 million copies in circulation.

== Premise ==
In Tokyo, there lived an outcast Grade 5 student named Honmaru Edojo who is a naughty youngster and one of the most trodden-upon losers in his class. He is in love with a smart and pretty girl in his class named Iyona Kawai, but is frequently humiliated in front of her thanks to the school's bully, Jabao Jaba, his companion Korekiyo Ryouguchiya and Iyona's mean-spirited friend, Rui Ijigawa. After a bad day at school and since almost everyone in town hates him for who he is, his misery and negative emotions reach its peak and nearly took its toll on him until he accidentally summons the great wizard, Taruruto. Since becoming friends, Taruruto uses his magical powers to help Honmaru deal with all his hardships and other challenges. Later conflicts arise when new students like the narcissistic egotist Tsutomu Harako, and much later the troubled twins, Neyo and Nezo Zakenja all transfer to Honmaru's school, all while the dark wizard Rivar attempts to eradicate Taruruto to divert the attention of fellow young wizard, Mimora, who is madly in love in Taruruto.

== Characters ==
=== Main characters ===
Taruruto (タルるート, Tarurūto)
Voiced by: Tarako
A young self-proclaimed wizard accidentally summoned by Honmaru. He and Honmaru quickly become best friends and is often used by Honmaru to perform several deeds that allow him to get the upperhand in life. Despite the title he gives himself, his magic only lasts ten minutes, which often puts Honmaru in a bind, assuming it falls flat on their faces or produce some other unwarranted effect. He enjoys eating takoyaki above anything else.
Honmaru Edojo (江戸城 本丸, Edojō Honmaru)
Voiced by: Minami Takayama
Honmaru is a blue-haired boy who is the town outcast. He is frequently bullied by classmates for his poor academic and athletic performance. His naughty behavior alienates him as well, earning the disappointment of the people of the town around him. Through Taruruto's magic, others begin to perceive him more favorably. Over time, Honmaru grows and discovers his inner strength as he faces difficult trials and challenges.
Iyona Kawai (河合 伊代菜, Kawai Iyona)
Voiced by: Yumi Tōma
Iyona is an elegant and kindhearted daughter of a wealthy family who Honmaru is in love with. Though she has mature features for her age, she is around the same height as her peers, almost always dresses modestly, and has a pure, caring, and honest personality. Unlike Honmaru she is also very talented, getting the top grades in her class and being a skilled athlete. Like Honmaru, she sees Taruruto as a surrogate young brother and despite his flaws, she may have some secret feelings towards Honmaru.

=== Supporting characters ===
Rui Ijigawa (伊知川 累, Ijigawa Rui)
Voiced by: Kazuko Sugiyama
Iyona's best friend, Rui is a cunning and mean-spirited prankster. Like Iyona, she has secret feelings for Honmaru, but hers are more overt. Despite that, Rui spends much of her time bullying and harassing Honmaru as a result of being rejected by him when they were younger.
Jabao Jaba (邪馬 じゃば夫, Jaba Jabao)
Voiced by: Yoku Shioya
Jabao is Honmaru's obese and ugly childhood bully whose grades are just as bad as his. Despite his weight, he is very muscular and has strong punches. He spends his time beating up Honmaru and often takes his anger out on him even when in the rare instances where he tries to help him. Over time, he becomes less dominant in power as new students keep overpowering him, which reveals his hidden cowardly nature. Despite his violent temper, he cares about his closest classmates deep down.
Korekiyo Ryoguchiya (両口屋 是清, Ryōguchiya Korekiyo)
Voiced by: Megumi Urawa
Korekiyo is a child with short stature who acts as Jabao's sidekick. While Jabao has terrible grades, Korekiyo is a weakling without money and unpopular with girls. Korekiyo seems polite and proper at first glance, but is a smartmouth who often speaks in proverbs and idioms, often taking shots on Honmaru. In the anime, he always serves as the commentator for any sporting events.
Mari Oaya (大綾 真理, Ōaya Mari)
Voiced by: Hiromi Tsuru
Mari is the young and strong-willed homeroom teacher of the main cast. Despite presenting herself as strict during school hours, she is infamous for using corporal punishment to discipline her students whenever they break the school rules, act naughty and violate policies and protégés. Deep down, Mari is a passionate and tomboyish lady who has extensive knowledge on sports and jumps at the opportunity for her and her students to compete in some new games. At home, she is laid-back and often seen cooking as well as exercising.
Tsutomu Harako (原子 力, Harako Tsutomu)
Voiced by: Ryō Horikawa
Tsutomu is a tall and arrogant transfer student from a wealthy family who acts mature for his age. He often boasts about being the junior champion of all sorts of challenges, regardless of whether they are genuine competitions or mundane and bizarre feats. Tsutomu becomes Honmaru's main rival and bully throughout the series due to their mutual love for Iyona and that Harako is quick to challenge him to any competition.
Neyo Zakenja (座剣邪 寧代, Zakenja Nēyo)
Voiced by: Mitsuko Horie
Neyo is a troublesome delinquent girl who transfers to the Honmaru's classroom.
Nezo Zakenja (座剣邪 寧蔵, Zakenja Nēzō)
Voiced by: Hirotaka Suzuoki
Nezo is Neyo's twin brother who also transferred to their school, but has a different homeroom. He eventually becomes Honmaru's ultimate rival and bully.
Shogunnosuke Edojo (江戸城 将軍之介, Edojō Shogunnosuke)
Voiced by: Hideyuki Hori
Shogunnosuke is Honmaru's father is a passionate and energetic picture book artist. Skilled in various martial arts, he acts as Honmaru's primary trainer, preparing him for competitions. Despite his role as a mentor, Shogunnosuke shares his son's tendency toward filthy behavior.
Chizuru Edojo (江戸城 千鶴, Edojō Chizuru)
Voiced by: Chieko Honda
Chizuru is Honmaru's kind and friendly mother who married Shogunnosuke at a young age.
Matsugoro Naniwa (浪速 松五郎, Naniwa Matsugorō)
Voiced by: Takeshi Aono
Matsugoro is a takoyaki chef from Osaka who is in love with Mari Oaya.
Tamamie (玉みえ)
Voiced by: Hinako Yoshino
The crystal ball that Taruruto wears around his neck.
Ria Kinakamo (りあ・キナカーモ, Ria Kinakāmo)
Voiced by: Yuriko Yamamoto
Ria is Taruruto's older sister who comes to Earth to search for Taruruto. She lets him stay and decides to hang around for herself.
Mimora (ミモラ)
Voiced by: Kumiko Nishihara
Mimora is Taruruto's self-proclaimed love interest. She gets jealous of anyone who becomes close to him.
Niruru (にるる)
Voiced by: Mayumi Seto
Niruru is a strange creature who is like a pet to Taruruto. They have the ability to shapeshift into an exact replica of any living being.
Rivar (ライバー, Raibā)
Voiced by: Teiyū Ichiryūsai
Rivar is an evil dark wizard who views himself as Taruruto's rival. He is in love with Mimora and pulls insidious tricks, ranging from hateful to near-fatal on both Taruruto and Honmaru to deviate Mimora's attention to him. One day during this time, Rivar once tried to take advantage of Honmaru's negative emotions and use them as his power source and brainwash him, but this backfires as Honmaru resists the negative emotions himself.

== Media ==
=== Manga ===
Written and illustrated by Tatsuya Egawa, Magical Taruruto was serialized in Shueisha's shōnen manga magazine Weekly Shōnen Jump from November 14, 1988, to September 21, 1992. Shueisha collected its chapters in 21 tankōbon volumes, released from July 15, 1989, to March 9, 1993.

In July 2020, Manga Planet announced that they had licensed the series for an English digital release on its platform, starting on August 7 of that same year. It was added to the Crunchyroll Manga service in January 2026.

==== Volumes ====
No.	Original release date	Original ISBN
1	July 1989	4-08-871531-4
2	September 1989	4-08-871532-2
3	November 1989	4-08-871533-0
4	January 1990	4-08-871534-9
5	March 1990	4-08-871535-7
6	May 1990	4-08-871536-5
7	July 1990	4-08-871537-3
8	September 1990	4-08-871538-1
9	November 1990	4-08-871539-X
10	January 1991	4-08-871540-3
11	March 1991	4-08-871541-1
12	June 1991	4-08-871542-X
13	September 1991	4-08-871543-8
14	December 1991	4-08-871544-6
15	February 1992	4-08-871545-4
16	May 1992	4-08-871546-2
17	July 1992	4-08-871547-0
18	September 1992	4-08-871548-9
19	November 1992	4-08-871549-7
20	January 1993	4-08-871559-4
21	March 1993	4-08-871560-8

=== Anime ===
An 87-episode anime television series adaptation, produced by Asahi Broadcasting Corporation, Asatsu and Toei Animation, was broadcast on ABC, TV Asahi and other stations from September 2, 1990, to May 10, 1992. The opening theme is "Ore Taruruto" (オレ タルるート, 'Me, Taruruto'), composed by Yukihide Takekawa and performed Tarako. The first endings theme is "Kimi to Sekai Seifuku!?" (キミと世界征服!?; 'Conquering the World with You!?'), composed by Chiho Kiyooka and performed by Midori Akiyama, while the second ending theme is "Taruru Kataburaruru" (タルル・カタブラルル), composed and performed by Tarako.

==== Episodes ====
No.	Title	Directed by	Written by	Animation directed by	Original release date
1	"Me, The Great Magician"; Transliteration: "Ore, Dai Mahōtsukai" (Japanese: オレ、大魔法使い)	Yamauchi Shigeyasu	Yoshiyuki Suga	Masahiko Okura	September 2, 1990
At school, the unlucky Grade 5 student Honmaru Edojo gets into a fight with the bully Jabao Jaba. After getting bruised badly, Honmaru goes to ask his father how to become a better fighter, but is dozing off. He screams "I'm really in trouble!" combined with his father's snoring sounds create a magic spell that summons the small magician Taruruto, who quickly befriends Honmaru while causing all sorts of trouble for him.
2	"Reaching Out to Iyona"; Transliteration: "Iyona ni Dokkin" (Japanese: 伊代菜にドッキン)	Yukio Kaizawa	Yoshiyuki Suga	Ikuko Itoh	September 9, 1990
Honmaru spends all morning thinking about the pretty girl Iyona Kawai. Using his magic, Taruruto finds out that Honmaru is deeply in love with Iyona and then helps Honmaru convey his feelings through a love letter. When that goes wrong, Taruruto then gets Iyona to come to Honmaru's house.
3	"Dangerous Transfer Student"; Transliteration: "Abunai Tenkōsei" (Japanese: あぶない転校生)	Yuji Endo	Yoshiyuki Suga	Choushichi Ikariya	September 16, 1990
The handsome and rich boy Tsutomu Harako makes an appearance in a parade celebrating the Harako Conglomerate. He then transfers to Honmaru's school where he immediately approaches Iyona, enraging Honmaru and the other boys. Jabao then challenges Harako to a contest for the right to walk home with Iyona, but Harako, being an all-around athlete, proves to be a fearsome competitor. Taruruto also discovers takoyaki which becomes his new favorite food.
4	"I Love Mama!"; Transliteration: "Mama, Daisuki!" (Japanese: ママ、大好き!)	Yoshihiro Oka	Yoshiyuki Suga	Hiroyuki Kawano	September 23, 1990
Taruruto was told by Honmaru not to let anyone in his house find out about him. However, Taruruto misses his mother and starts clinging to Honmaru's mother Chizuru once she finds out about him.
5	"Preparing for the Test with Magic"; Transliteration: "Mahō de Tesuto Taisaku" (Japanese: 魔法でテスト対策)	Akinori Yabe	Yoshiyuki Suga	Eikichi Takahashi	September 30, 1990
Taruruto shrinks himself and goes to school with Honmaru. In class, Taruruto uses his magic to play tricks at Honmaru's desk. Honmaru is scolded by his teacher Miss Mari Oaya, who seizes Taruruto, thinking he is a doll. The two later sneak into her house to get the answers for the upcoming test.
6	"The Great Quest for Treasure!!"; Transliteration: "Takaramono Daisakusen!" (Japanese: 宝もの大作戦！！)	Hiroyuki Kakudō	Yoshiyuki Suga	Eikichi Takahashi	October 7, 1990
Honmaru and Taruruto go on a treasure hunt after Honmaru's father gives him a map that shows the location of the secret treasure that is said to be worth 5 billion yen in money. However, Harako is on his way to beat them to it. Unbeknownst to them, a mysterious figure is guarding the treasure.
7	"I am Rui Ijigawa"; Transliteration: "Watashi wa Rui Ijigawa" (Japanese: 私はイジガワルイ)	Yamauchi Shigeyasu	Yoshiyuki Suga	Setsuko Harada	October 14, 1990
Honmaru is in conflict with Iyona's mean-spirited friend Rui Ijigawa. After one too many pranks and hecklings, Honmaru tries to get back at her by using Taruruto's magic.
8	"Magic Ball Baseball!!"; Transliteration: "Makyū de Yakyū da!!" (Japanese: 魔球で野球だ！！)	Yukio Kaizawa	Ken'ichi Kanemaki	Ikuko Itoh	October 21, 1990
A baseball game is being held during class, and Honmaru is eager to show off to Iyona. However, Harako interferes by mixing laxatives into Honmaru and Taruruto's school lunches. Honmaru, who's the pitcher for his team, finds himself in a pinch due to the effects of the laxative, while Taruruto uses his magic for the team to get the upperhand.
9	"Takoyaki of Friendship!"; Transliteration: "Yūjō no Takoyaki!" (Japanese: 友情のタコ焼き！)	Yuji Endo	Yoshiyuki Suga	Hiroyuki Kawano	October 28, 1990
Taruruto ate all of the takoyaki Honmaru bought with his recent allowance. After being scolded by Honmaru, Taruruto goes to buy more in a rush, but has no money.
10	"Conscientious Use of Oppoosite Person"; Transliteration: "Ungyakun ni Goyōshin" (Japanese: うん逆んにご用心)	Yoshihiro Oka	Yoshiyuki Suga	Hisashi Eguchi	November 11, 1990
Honmaru gets a pounding from Jabao for giving him the wrong answers to his homework. Taruruto then uses a magic item that results in good outcomes when you do bad things. Honmaru gets carried away by the effect and sometime after the magic's ten minutes are up, he plays a mean prank on Iyona thinking it will benefit him.
11	"Unyielding Boxing"; Transliteration: "Hisshō Bokushingu" (Japanese: 必勝ボクシング)	Akinori Yabe	Yoshiyuki Suga	Masahiko Okura	November 18, 1990
During class, a pen moved by Taruruto's magic flies off and hits Harako, who angrily blames Honmaru for it. Miss Oaya suggests that the two of them settle things with a boxing match. Honmaru accepts the challenge and begins his boxing training with the help of Taruruto.
12	"Honmaru's KO Punch"; Transliteration: "Honmaru KO Panchi" (Japanese: 本丸KOパンチ)	Hiroyuki Kakudō	Yoshiyuki Suga	Eikichi Takahashi	November 25, 1990
The match between Honmaru and Harako begins. Taruruto helps a struggling Honmaru with some magic items, but Harako unleashes a powerful special move. Furthermore, Taruruto is lured by takoyaki from Harako's butler, leaving Honmaru on his own.
13	"Unruly Birthday Party"; Transliteration: "Jinginaki o Tanjōkai" (Japanese: 仁義なきお誕生会)	Yamauchi Shigeyasu	Yoshiyuki Suga	Setsuko Harada	December 2, 1990
Honmaru is invited to Iyona's birthday party. He hopes to be alone with her, but all of their other friends have been invited as well and Taruruto begs Honmaru to let him tag along. While all of them playing a game of concentration, Iyona's mother Ina suggests that Iyona should give a kiss to the winner.
14	"Sister Ria Makes an Appearance"; Transliteration: "Ria Ne-chan Tōjō" (Japanese: りあ姉ちゃん登場)	Yuji Endo	Yoshiyuki Suga	Tetsuya Kumagai	December 9, 1990
One day, Honmaru finds a woman in his room. Thinking that she is Taruruto in disguise, he plays a prank on her, but ends up getting it thrown right back in his face. To his surprise, she is actually Taruruto's older sister, Ria Kinakamo, who has come to take him back to the magic realm.
15	"The Honmaru Family's Wind Panic"; Transliteration: "Honmaru-ke no Kaze Sōdō" (Japanese: 本丸家のカゼ騒動)	Yoshihiro Oka	Yoshiyuki Suga	Hiroyuki Kawano	December 16, 1990
Honmaru forgot to do his homework and thinks about skipping school by lying that he has a cold. Ria grants his wish, but the magic effect wears off after ten days, leading the person who catches the cold next to suffer twice as much.
16	"Takoyaki Christmas"; Transliteration: "Takoyaki Kurisumasu" (Japanese: タコ焼きクリスマス)	Akinori Yabe	Aya Matsui	Hisashi Eguchi	December 23, 1990
Honmaru makes a miniature tree as a present for the gift exchange during the class' Christmas party, but Taruruto accidentally destroys it. Ria reminds Honmaru of the true meaning of Christmas and uses magic to decorate and shrink a fir tree. Honmaru hopes to give the tree to Iyona during the exchange, but it ends up in Jabao's hands instead.
17	"Friends of the Magic Realm"; Transliteration: "Mahō no Kuni no Otomodachi" (Japanese: 魔法の国のお友達)	Hiroyuki Kakudō	Yoshiyuki Suga	Masahiko Okura	December 30, 1990
Honmaru notices the presence of a classmate he has never seen before, Raibaru Taruno. Iyona becomes friendly with Taruno, and says she will go to his house after school. Worried, Honmaru and Taruruto sneak into Taruno's house, where they find Iyona crucified on a cross, and discover that he is actually the dark magician known as Rivar, who is after the affection of Taru's friend Mimora.
18	"Rivar's Great Counterattack"; Transliteration: "Raibā no Daigyakushū" (Japanese: ライバーの大逆襲)	Takao Iwai & Yamauchi Shigeyasu	Yoshiyuki Suga	Masami Abe	January 6, 1991
Honmaru cannot help but look at how flirtatious Mimora is with Taruruto. Rivar is jealous that his beloved Mimora is with Taruruto, so he uses his magic to transform himself into Taruruto and try to flirt with Mimora.
19	"Punishment at Dad!"; Transliteration: "Papa ni Oshioki!" (Japanese: パパにおしおき！)	Yukio Kaizawa	Ken'ichi Kanemaki	Masami Abe	January 13, 1991
Chizuru is looking forward to her wedding anniversary. Taruruto, who does not understand the meaning of marriage, follows Honmaru's father, Shogunnosuke, to ask him. There, he sees Shogunnosuke receiving a present from a woman at a coffee shop, and he and Honmaru start to believe he is being unfaithful to Chizuru.
20	"Skimaru of the Silver!"; Transliteration: "Shirogane no Sukīmaru!" (Japanese: 白銀のスキー丸!)	Yukio Kaizawa	Aya Matsui	Setsuko Harada	January 20, 1991
When Honmaru goes on a school ski trip, he claims to be a great skier even though he struggles at it. Despite training with Taruruto's magic, Honmaru does not improve. However, on the day of the trip, he ends up surprising everyone.
21	"Hot Springs Give Rise to Love Divination"; Transliteration: "Onsen Kibun de Koi Uranai" (Japanese: 温泉気分で恋占い)	Hiroyuki Kakudō	Aya Matsui	Tetsuya Kumagai	January 27, 1991
Honmaru becomes an instant hero after showing off his newfound skiing skills, but gets nervous when he finds out that Iyona and Ijigawa are going try out a love fortune-telling game. When the girls and Miss Oaya decide to go to Onsen, Harako gets the insidious idea to switch the signs for the mens and women's hot tubs, putting Honmaru in a bind.
22	"Primal Rage Runs Rampage"; Transliteration: "Gekiretsu-gō dai abare" (Japanese: げきれつ号大暴れ)	Akinori Yabe	Yoshiyuki Suga	Hiroyuki Kawano	February 3, 1991
The class decides to keep a squirrel, but everyone except Iyona quickly start neglecting it. The squirrel starts to lose energy, so Honmaru gives it Power-Upple Juice, as per Taruruto's suggestion. The magical drink works too well, causing the squirrel to speak like a human and become large and powerful enough to kidnap Iyona.
23	"Valentine Declaration"; Transliteration: "Barentain Sengen" (Japanese: バレンタイン宣言)	Hiroyuki Kakudō	Aya Matsui	Masami Abe	February 10, 1991
Taruruto uses a magic circle to summon his pet Niruru from the magic realm. Niruru can change into whatever he sees when his tail is held. Wanting to have a good Valentine's Day for once, Honmaru goes to school to try to turn Niruru into Iyona. Meanwhile, Rivar tries to cast a permanent laughing spell on Taruruto.
24	"Dreadful Grandpa"; Transliteration: "Kyōfu no Jīchan" (Japanese: 恐怖のじいちゃん)	Yoshihiro Oka	Yoshiyuki Suga	Setsuko Harada	February 17, 1991
After meeting Jabao's surprisingly harsh grandfather, Honmaru wants to meet his own grandfather. However, he learns that his maternal grandfather Ugunji Jinguji and Shogunnosuke have been on terrible terms with each other because he eloped with Chizuru when they were teenagers.
25	"Dangerous Snowball Fight!?"; Transliteration: "Abunai Yukigassen!?" (Japanese: アブナイ雪合戦！？)	Yukio Kaizawa	Katsuyuki Sumisawa	Hiroyuki Kawano	February 24, 1991
In a cold snowy morning, Honmaru is warmed up by Taruruto's magic item, "Warm-Up Heater-kun". He wears nothing to school except jogging shorts. Honmaru has a snowball fight with Harako, whose wealth gives him access to all of the latest weapons.
26	"To Battle, Honmaru!"; Transliteration: "Dosukoi Honmaru!" (Japanese: どすこい本丸！)	Akinori Yabe	Yoshiyuki Suga	Tetsuya Kumagai	March 3, 1991
Jabao often beat Honmaru in sumo-wrestling when they were small children, and Honmaru gets angry when his classmates brings it up. Miss Oaya sees this and decides hold a sumo match to see who is the strongest sumo wrestler, but Harako has to outsmart everyone.
27	"Honmaru Enters the Ring!"; Transliteration: "Honmaru, Dohyōiri!" (Japanese: 本丸、土俵入り！)	Kazuhito Kikuchi	Yoshiyuki Suga	Kenichi Chikanaga	March 10, 1991
Wanting to prepare for the sumo-wrestling tournament, Honmaru goes through some tough training in Canada, including fighting a bear. Meanwhile, Jabao steals school lunches to get in shape and Harako eats a special chankonabe while training. On the day of the match, all of their bodies are perfectly shaped like sumo wrestlers.
28	"A One-in-a-Kind Guy Who Comes From Osaka"; Transliteration: "Ōsaka Kara Kita Sugoi Yatsu" (Japanese: 大阪から来た凄い奴)	Hiroyuki Kakudō	Katsuyuki Sumisawa	Masami Abe	March 17, 1991
A new takoyaki chef in town, Matsugoro Naniwa, makes a tasty takoyaki. He falls in love with Miss Oaya at first sight and tries to impress her by taking her class, but ends up failing.
29	"Iyona's Heated Battle"; Transliteration: "Iyona no Atsuki Tatakai" (Japanese: 伊代菜の熱き闘い)	Akinori Yabe	Katsuyuki Sumisawa	Hisashi Eguchi	March 24, 1991
Iyona's volleyball team advances to the finals of the regional tournament. Their opponents in the finals are Higashino Elementary School, the school of the 195 cm tall Kusuda sisters. Honmaru helps Iyona by coaching her and even uses Taruruto's magic to transform into a girl to provide backup, going by the name of "Marue Emoto".
30	"Mimora's Great Rampage!" (Japanese: ミモラの大破壊！)	Yoshihiro Oka	Yoshiyuki Suga	Setsuko Harada	March 31, 1991
With Mimora hanging around Taruruto more often, Honmaru has been constantly on edge as her crying has had disastrous results. When Mimora was on the verge of crying again, Taruruto succeeded in making her laugh. However, making her laugh too much turns out to be just as bad.
31	"Because It's Spring, I'm Cheering for Love"; Transliteration: "Haru dakara Koi no Ōen" (Japanese: 春だから恋の応援)	Yukio Kaizawa	Aya Matsui	Hiroyuki Kawano	April 7, 1991
Mimora becomes jealous when she sees how close Taruruto and Iyona are and decides to support Honmaru's love for Iyona, thinking that if she can get those two together, there will be no one to get in the way of her and Taru's relationship. Note: This is when Honmaru starts Grade 6.
32	"Jump Out! Giant Monster"; Transliteration: "Tobidase! Daikaijū" (Japanese: 飛び出せ！大怪獣)	Hiroyuki Kakudō	Katsuyuki Sumisawa	Tetsuya Kumagai	April 14, 1991
In class, Honmaru and the others draw their favorite creatures. Then, Harako and Jabao get into a fight over whose drawing is better. Wanting to settle the score, Taruruto uses magic to make the creatures that were drawn come to life, but Jabao's monster drawing eats the other drawings and begins to terrorize the school.
33	"The Grand Adventure in a Picture Book"; Transliteration: "Ehon no Daibōken" (Japanese: 絵本の中で大冒険)	Kazuhito Kikuchi	Aya Matsui	Kenichi Chikanaga	April 21, 1991
After reading Shogunnosuke's picture book, Honmaru makes fun of the protagonist, Doberk. Ria then uses her magic to send Honmaru, who claims to be braver than him, and Taruruto into the book. After meeting Doberk, Honmaru meets a beautiful girl named Nayoi and accepts a request from her to save her village from the monstrous Eland and the wicked vampire Count Racul.
34	"This Is Your End! Great King Dowahha"; Transliteration: "Taose! Dowahha Daiō" (Japanese: 倒せ！どわっは大王)	Akinori Yabe	Aya Matsui	Katsutoshi Isshi	April 28, 1991
The Great King Dowahha, angry that two of his elite subordinates were defeated, launches an all-out attack on Nayoi's village using the threatening creature Patulous and the reptilian beast Gabeira. The evil king then considers invading the real world as payback.
35	"Takoyakinfection to Conquer the World"; Transliteration: "Takoyakinde Sekai Seifuku" (Japanese: たこや菌で世界征服)	Yoshihiro Oka	Katsuyuki Sumisawa	Hiroyuki Kawano	May 5, 1991
Taruruto, who wants to eat more of Matsugoro's takoyakis, uses a spell found in Mimora's magic book to create his own. The spell is successful and an endless stream of takoyaki is created, overflowing into the Edojo house and eventually the entire city. Honmaru and Taruruto are satisfied after eating so much, but after eating two sentient pieces, the two become takoyaki themselves.
36	"I'm a Man, Rui Ijigawa"; Transliteration: "Ore wa Otoko da Rui Ijigawa" (Japanese: 俺は男だ伊知川累)	Yukio Kaizawa	Yoshiyuki Suga	Tatsufumi Tamakawa	May 12, 1991
Ijigawa uses her girlhood as a weapon to spite Honmaru. Honmaru gets angry and uses the magic gender-changing juice to reverse both of their genders. Now that Honmaru's turned into Marue Emoto, he begins to understand Ijigawa's feelings a little better. However, Ijigawa becomes twice as ruthless as a boy.
37	"Midday Dodgeball"; Transliteration: "Mahiru no Dodjibōru" (Japanese: 真昼のドッジボール)	Takao Iwai and Hiroyuki Kakudō	Katsuyuki Sumisawa	Masayuki Uchiyama	May 19, 1991
Harako challenges Honmaru to a dodgeball match in class. Taruruto helps Honmaru through some major training and preparation for the match, as he will never be able to speak to Iyona again if his team loses.
38	"Honmaru's Worst and Unluckiest Day Ever"; Transliteration: "Honmaru Saikyō Saiaku no Hi" (Japanese: 本丸最凶最悪の日)	Akinori Yabe	Katsuyuki Sumisawa	Kenichi Chikanaga	May 26, 1991
Honmaru's bad luck is starting to take a toll on him, so Taruruto gives him a small charm that will bring good luck throughout the day. The next day, he accidentally runs off with a charm that gives him even worse luck than before.
39	"Good Honmaru, Bad Honmaru"; Transliteration: "Iie Honmaru, Warui Honmaru" (Japanese: いい本丸 悪い本丸)	Yoshihiro Oka	Katsuyuki Sumisawa	Katsutoshi Isshi	June 2, 1991
Alongside the others, Ijigawa makes fun of Honmaru's test results and starts pointing out all of his shortcomings one after another. Taruruto gives Honmaru the magic item, Zenakun, to get back at them by pointing out their flaws.
40	"Zakenja Neyo" (Japanese: ざけんじゃねえよ)	Junji Shimizu	Aya Matsui	Hiroyuki Kawano	June 9, 1991
A girl saves Taruruto from being chased by a stray dog with her amazing kendama skills. Honmaru's heart starts beating a little when he sees the girl's smile. The next day, a new student named Neyo Zakenja transfers to Honmaru's class and turns out to be the girl he an Taruruto met yesterday. Honmaru then sees that she is not as pleasant as he though she was.
41	"Dishonest Neyo!"; Transliteration: "Sunaojaneyo!" (Japanese: 素直じゃねえよ！)	Yukio Kaizawa	Aya Matsui	Tatsufumi Tamakawa	June 16, 1991
Neyo demonstrates her amazing basketball skills during PE class. However, nobody is satisfied with Neyo due to her apathetic attitude and that she plays alone without considering teamwork. Afterwards, Ijigawa starts making a fuss about the classroom funds that she collected from the whole class disappearing, leading to everyone blaming Neyo except Honmaru and Iyona.
42	"The Tongue is the Root of Calamities?"; Transliteration: "Kuchi wa Wazawai no Moto?" (Japanese: 口は災いの元？)	Akinori Yabe	Yoshiyuki Suga	Masayuki Uchiyama	June 23, 1991
Honmaru, who said he would run a marathon, gets scolded by Shogunnosuke for breaking his promise. Honmaru asks Taruruto for an item that will make whatever he says come true, but that means exactly everything he says will come true, which does not go over well in the long run.
43	"It's Summer! The Pool is Open"; Transliteration: "Natsu da! Pūru-biraki" (Japanese: 夏だ！プール開き)	Kazuhito Kikuchi	Katsuyuki Sumisawa	Kenichi Chikanaga	June 30, 1991
The day before the pool opens, Honmaru, who's been known for not being able to swim, trains hard with the help of Taruruto and Ria. The next day, the first day of swimming class, the class decides to have a game of tag. Honmaru proceeds to show off his newfound swimming skills, but he accidentally touches Iyona's breasts.
44	"Please, Lighting-sama"; Transliteration: "Kaminari-sama ni Onegai" (Japanese: かみなり様にお願い)	Yoshihiro Oka	Aya Matsui	Katsutoshi Isshi	July 7, 1991
Honmaru and the others are excited about a popular weekly anime series. Harako, who has not seen the show and is snubbed from the conversation, gets angry at being ignored and uses the power of the Harako Conglomerate to cut off the electricity from Honmaru's house. The Edojo family live happily for a while, but the day before the anime airs, Honmaru cannot take it anymore and is forced to take matters into his own hands.
45	"A New Rival Appears!"; Transliteration: "Shin Raibaru Tōjō!" (Japanese: 新ライバル登場！)	Yukio Kaizawa	Yoshiyuki Suga	Hiroyuki Kawano	July 14, 1991
A violent and intimidating transfer student from the next class pays a visit to Honmaru's class and starts trouble with the other students. He punches Jabao, blackmails Harako, and coming close to violating Iyona, while declaring to make everyone either his servants or slaves. The student is revealed to be Nezo Zakenja, Neyo's twin brother.
46	"We Must Win the Pool Showdown!"; Transliteration: "Hisshō Pūru Taiketsu!" (Japanese: 必勝プール対決！)	Junji Shimizu	Yoshiyuki Suga	Tatsufumi Tamakawa	July 21, 1991
During a swimming class, Nezo, who's in Class 2, refused to let Honmaru and the rest of Class 1 use the locker room. Miss Oaya came up with an idea to have a contest for the right to use the locker room. Harako, Jabao, Iyona, and Honmaru's team challenged the team made of Nezo and a few other students from Class 2.
47	"Mischievous Seaside School"; Transliteration: "Itazura Rinkai Gakkō" (Japanese: イタズラ臨海学校)	Akinori Yabe	Katsuyuki Sumisawa	Masami Abe	July 28, 1991
Honmaru and the others go to the beach for a seaside school trip. They have a great time arguing over whose swimsuit is the best, and are thrown into a frenzy by Taruruto's pranks. Honmaru also learns to surf under the guidance of Miss Oaya.
48	"Exhausting Test of Courage"; Transliteration: "Heto-heto Kimodameshi" (Japanese: ヘトヘト肝だめし)	Kazuhito Kikuchi	Katsuyuki Sumisawa	Kenichi Chikanaga	August 4, 1991
On the last day of the seaside school trip, the students compete in long-distance swimming. Honmaru competed against Harako, but was exhausted in the second half of the race. Later that night, Honmaru uses a lucky draw to pair up with Iyona for a creepy courage test and uses Taruruto to plan out a frightful strategy to scare Iyona and make Honmaru look like her hero. Unfortunately for him, it somewhow works well.
49	"Down the River with Kappa"; Transliteration: "Kappappa Kawashitari" (Japanese: かっぱっぱ川下り)	Yoshihiro Oka	Aya Matsui	Katsutoshi Isshi	August 11, 1991
On the way home from school, Honmaru and Taruruto rescue a weakened kappa found in the river. The kappa, named Kotaro, is lost, so they decide to take him home for a while, and then head back up the river in a submarine. However, Kotaro's home has been demolished and is turned into a golf course.
50	"Gritty Endurance Contest"; Transliteration: "Dokonjō Gaman Taikai" (Japanese: ど根性がまん大会)	Yukio Kaizawa	Yoshiyuki Suga	Tetsuya Kumagai	August 18, 1991
Honmaru eats too much shaved ice and gets an upset stomach, so Shogunnosuke forbids him from eating more of it. Meanwhile, Honmaru learns that the prize for the Heat Endurance Contest is unlimited shaved ice and decides to enter.
51	"Doing Homework With Magic?"; Transliteration: "Mahō de Shukudai Sururu?" (Japanese: 魔法で宿題するる？)	Akinori Yabe	Yoshiyuki Suga	Hiroyuki Kawano	August 25, 1991
As summer vacation ends, everyone becomes nervous about the remaining homework. Honmaru is in high spirits, believing that Taruruto's magic will do the trick, while the others meets up for a study session to finish their homework.
52	"Soccer Duel!"; Transliteration: "Sakkā de Shōbu!" (Japanese: サッカーで勝負！)	Junji Shimizu	Katsuyuki Sumisawa	Masayuki Uchiyama	September 1, 1991
During soccer class, Harako remembers the bitter defeats he has faced in his previous matches against Honmaru. Likewise, Honmaru begins to train hard to face him in a fierce soccer match two weeks later.
53	"Birthday All Alone"; Transliteration: "Hitoribocchi no Tanjōbi" (Japanese: 一人ぼっちの誕生日)	Kazuhito Kikuchi	Aya Matsui	Hisashi Eguchi	September 8, 1991
On the birthday of Zakenja twins, Neyo seems lonely. Neyo's classmates send her cards with written messages, but she throws them away. Taruruto tries to use a magic item to cheer Neyo up, but ends up making her angry instead.
54	"Friends with Yamabiko"; Transliteration: "Yamabiko Tomodachi" (Japanese: やまびこ・友だち)	Yoshihiro Oka	Katsuyuki Sumisawa	Ikuko Itō	September 15, 1991
Honmaru and his friends go mountain climbing and Taruruto is surprised by the echo he hears out in the open. Jabao throws away an empty juice can in the lake. Mountain Echo Taro, the boy who throws the can back at Jabao, gets angry at people who throw trash.
55	"Date on an Autumn Day"; Transliteration: "Aki no Hi no Dēto" (Japanese: 秋の日のデート)	Yukio Kaizawa	Aya Matsui	Katsutoshi Isshi	September 22, 1991
Honmaru wants to go on a date with Iyona in autumn. Ria puts a pentagram sticker on Honmaru and says it will grant him one wish. Honmaru goes to the park to wish for a date and meets Iyona as Taruruto supports him from behind.
56	"Honmaru's Tearful Determination!"; Transliteration: "Honmaru, Namida no Kesshin!" (Japanese: 本丸、涙の決心！)	Akinori Yabe	Yoshiyuki Suga	Tetsuya Kumagai	September 29, 1991
Honmaru walks Iyona and Ijigawa home from cram school, but they harassed by some delinquents. After the trio is saved by Nezo, who happened to be passing by, Honmaru grows frustrated. Wanting to become stronger and surpass Nezo, he retreats to the mountains for a month with Shogunnosuke and begins intensive training without relying on any magic. Taruruto becomes depressed as he has to be away from his best friend for a while. Meanwhile, Nezo challenges the students of Class 1 to a martial arts tournament, with Harako, Taruruto, and the absent Honmaru as Class 1's representatives.
57	"Clash! Martial Arts Tournament!!"; Transliteration: "Gekitotsu! Butō-kai!!" (Japanese: 激突！武闘会！！)	Kazuhito Kikuchi	Yoshiyuki Suga	Hiroyuki Kawano	October 6, 1991
One month after Honmaru began training, the martial arts tournament planned by Nezo to control of Nanno Elementary School began, but Honmaru is still not present. The first match is between Harako and one of Nezo's partners, the stoic Kaze Kumagoro. Harako has a hard time with the wind reflecting his techniques.
58	"Stand Up! Honmaru"; Transliteration: "Tachiagare! Honmaru" (Japanese: 立ちあがれ！本丸)	Junji Shimizu	Yoshiyuki Suga	Masayuki Uchiyama	October 13, 1991
Honmaru finally returns home before the final match between him and Nezo begins. The former can compete thanks to his training, but Nezo still proves to be the stronger of the boys. Taruruto, who accidentally revealed that he is a magician and lost his match, tries to use magic to help Honmaru, but will be disqualified if he intervenes. Honmaru becomes enraged when Nezo tells him that he is even weaker than Taruruto.
59	"Honmaru's Final Battle!"; Transliteration: "Honmaru, Saigo no Tatakai!" (Japanese: 本丸、最後の闘い！)	Hiroyuki Kakudō	Yoshiyuki Suga	Yoshitaka Koyama	October 20, 1991
In the homestretch of the battle, Honmaru is corrupted by the evil energy of Nezo's Demonic Sword Wave. He tries to repel it, but Nezo's dark energy is so overwhelming that it even creates a fierce hatred of everyone in Honmaru's heart.
60	"Magical World"; Transliteration: "Majikaru Wārudo" (Japanese: まじかるワールド)	Yoshihiro Oka	Aya Matsui	Hisashi Eguchi	October 27, 1991
Honmaru defeated Nezo, but died from overexerting himself, and his soul got sucked into the spirit world. Taruruto hears that Honmaru may come back to life if he takes him to the magic realm, but at the cost of never being able to return to this world.
61	"Operation Resurrection"; Transliteration: "Ikikaeri Daisakusen" (Japanese: 生き返り大作戦)	Yukio Kaizawa	Yoshiyuki Suga	Katsutoshi Isshi	November 10, 1991
Taruruto reunites with his mother in the magic realm, but is told he cannot bring Honmaru back to life. Hearing that Horiyama's emit crying sounds has the power to reverse the death of a person, Honmaru and Taruruto visit the mountains to face some of the other magicians.
62	"Goodbye, Honmaru"; Transliteration: "Sayonara, Honmaru" (Japanese: さようなら、本丸)	Akinori Yabe	Aya Matsui	Tetsuya Kumagai	November 17, 1991
Honmaru and Taruruto challenge the powerful wizard Mahalapa, but cannot beat the wizard with magic and challenge him to a game of rock-paper-scissors. Realizing that Mahalapa is a pervert, Taruruto turns Honmaru into Marue Emoto to attract him and put him off his guard.
63	"Overcrowded with Magicians"; Transliteration: "Mahōtsukai de Chō-man'in" (Japanese: 魔法使いで超満員)	Kazuhito Kikuchi	Yoshiyuki Suga	Masayuki Uchiyama	November 24, 1991
Taruruto returns to the magic realm and brings Honmaru back to life, but the latter has been wiped and all of the other Earth beings memories. Honmaru feels like something is missing and remembers Taruruto with the others when he sees a child in the city. They try to summon him again, only to bring about some other familiar faces.
64	"Combination! Ijigawa, Mimora"; Transliteration: "Gattai! Ijigawa Mimora" (Japanese: 合体！伊知川ミモラ)	Junji Shimizu	Yoshiyuki Suga	Hiroyuki Kawano	December 1, 1991
With Mimora summoned by Ijigawa, she is staying at her house. However, their selfish personalities do not match up and becomes a big fuss. The next day, Ijigawa sees Honmaru getting along with Iyona. Upon finding Niruru, she decides to stirs up trouble. Ijigawa makes Niruru transform into Honmaru and uses him as a method to frame Honmaru for a prank aimed at Iyona, then forces Mimora to comply and help with the prank.
65	"Rivar's Unrequited Love"; Transliteration: "Raibā no Kataomoi" (Japanese: ライバーの片想い)	Hiroshi Shidara	Aya Matsui	Yoshitaka Koyama	December 8, 1991
Rivar is living at Miss Oaya's house as she was the one who summoned him. He is annoyed seeing Mimora flirting with Taruruto, and while the teacher sees through him and scolds him, she also tells him to show his masculine image through sports.
66	"Mad Marathon"; Transliteration: "Tondema Marason" (Japanese: とんでもマラソン)	Yoshihiro Oka	Katsuyuki Sumisawa	Katsutoshi Isshi	December 15, 1991
Honmaru and the others are excited about the marathon. Harako makes several anti-magic countermeasures to prevent Honmaru from getting the upper hand with Taruruto's magic and even tampers with the water being distributed to Honmaru at the halfway point.
67	"Taru's Takoyaki Shop"; Transliteration: "Taruruto no Takoyaki-ya" (Japanese: タルのたこやき屋)	Yukio Kaizawa	Aya Matsui	Masayuki Uchiyama	December 22, 1991
Taruruto rushes to Matsugoro's takoyaki shop. After becoming gigantic, he steps on the stand and injures Matsugoro. Then Matsugoro's brother appears to demand payment for his debt, demanding that he pays it back in three days. Wanting to help out, Taruruto decides to make his own takoyaki shop while Matsugoro recovers.
68	"Hot Skate"; Transliteration: "Atsu-atsu Sukēto" (Japanese: あつあつスケート)	Akinori Yabe	Yoshiyuki Suga	Tetsuya Kumagai	December 29, 1991
During a morning training session, Honmaru encounters Iyona. At that time of his death, Honmaru remembers that she had said "I love you, Honmaru-kun", but her thoughts are later revealed during an ice-skating session.
69	"The Best New Year Ever!"; Transliteration: "Saikō daze Oshōgatsu!" (Japanese: 最高だぜお正月！)	Junji Shimizu	Katsuyuki Sumisawa	Hiroyuki Kawano	January 5, 1992
On New Year's Eve, Honmaru and Taruruto went to the barber. Taruruto, who was amuzed by the barber, stopped time and cut Honmaru's hair. After enraging Honmaru, he uses magic to make his hair grow back, but it's pointless because the effect wears off in 10 minutes.
70	"Throbbing Tooth Bugs Infection!!"; Transliteration: "Zuki-zuki Mushihakin!!" (Japanese: ズキズキ虫歯菌！！)	Hiroshi Shidara	Yoshiyuki Suga	Yoshitaka Koyama	January 12, 1992
Honmaru ended up with cavities despite being warned by his mother about not brushing his teeth. He does not want to go to the dentist so he hides it, but a dental check-up was already scheduled at school.
71	"Fresh Otoko"; Transliteration: "Sawayakana Otoko" (Japanese: さわやかなオトコ)	Akinori Matsubara and Akinori Yabe	Yoshiyuki Suga	Masami Abe	January 19, 1992
Honmaru is challenged to a race to the school gates by a beautiful boy, Onna Otoko. Even after losing the race, Otoko remains pleasant and cheerful, but seeing that Otoko is close to Iyona, Honmaru becomes jealous and tries to expose this new rival as a lecher.
72	"Duel with Otoko!"; Transliteration: "Otoko to Shōbu!" (Japanese: 男闘呼と勝負っ！)	Kazuhito Kikuchi	Yoshiyuki Suga	Masayuki Uchiyama	January 26, 1992
It turns out that Otoko is actually a girl. When Honmaru loses to Otoko in a dodgeball game during their lunch break, everyone blames him. However, he is saved when Otoko suggests they play together. Honmaru then challenges Otoko to a game in a manly spirit.
73	"Rivar's Pure Diary"; Transliteration: "Raibā Junjō Nikki" (Japanese: ライバー純情日記)	Tooru Yamada	Katsuyuki Sumisawa	Haruya Nakahira	February 2, 1992
Rivar tries to win Mimora's heart with a present. He takes various things from the store without permission and tries to give them to Mimora. However, Miss Oaya finds out and gets angry. He decides to try to be honest and do his best.
74	"Ria's Love Story"; Transliteration: "Ria no Ai no Monogatari" (Japanese: りあの愛の物語)	Akinori Yabe	Yoshiyuki Suga	Ikuko Itō	February 9, 1992
Honmaru and Taruruto discover Shogunnosuke's manuscript of a picture book titled Ria's Love Story. The story begins with Gosuke-don, a dim-witted but hardworking man, summoning Ria with a magic book found in the village headman's storehouse during a fire. Ria tries to help grant Gosuke's wish to get a wife but accidentally falls under the spell. When she remains by his side in ten days, Ria helps Gosuke overcome the angry headman's unreasonable demands.
75	"Taruru! Cook-san"; Transliteration: "Taruru! Kukku-san" (Japanese: たるる！コックさん)	Yoshihiro Oka	Yoshiyuki Suga	Hiroyuki Kawano	February 16, 1992
During a cooking class, Honmaru's classmates are amazed at how delicious the miso soup he makes is. Harako makes a special soup, but get angry and challenges Honmaru to a cooking contest after realizing that his soup is more popular.
76	"Special Training for Neyo!"; Transliteration: "Neyo ni Tokkun!" (Japanese: 寧代にとっくん！)	Junji Shimizu	Yoshiyuki Suga	Yoshitaka Koyama	February 23, 1992
Honmaru and Taruruto come across Neyo being harassed by delinquents. Neyo is saved by magic but gets angry, believing she did not need any help. Her magic reveals her true feelings that she wants to become stronger on her own to defeat the delinquents who are trying to steal money from children, especially now that Nezo is training in the mountains.
77	"Calling on Hardworking Pixiervants!"; Transliteration: "Hissatsu Shigoto Hito Sanjō!" (Japanese: 必殺シゴト人参上！)	Hiroshi Shidara	Katsuyuki Sumisawa	Masayuki Uchiyama	March 1, 1992
Honmaru is struggling with his home economics homework, while the strict Shogunnosuke will not let Chizuru help him. Seeing how lost Honmaru is, Ria puts him to bed and uses magic to summon a worker to help him complete the task. Honmaru declares that the heavy homework will be easy with the help of the worker.
78	"Good Guy!? Jabao"; Transliteration: "Zen'nin!? Jabao" (Japanese: 善人！？じゃば夫)	Kazuhito Kikuchi	Yoshiyuki Suga	Katsutoshi Isshi	March 8, 1992
As the classmates are outraged by Jabao's bullying actions, Honmaru puts up with it, thinking of Iyona who hates fighting. Meanwhile, Taruruto feeds Jabao the food that conveys the feelings of Honmaru and his friends, making him understand and succeeding in making amends.
79	"Reconciling is Hard!"; Transliteration: "Nakanaoritte Taihen!" (Japanese: 仲直りって大変！)	Akinori Yabe	Aya Matsui	Haruya Nakahira	March 15, 1992
Korekiyo Ryoguchiya, who boasts about his rare shell money, Cain, is furious when Honmaru destroys it. Since he does not forgive him easily, Taruruto has been dozing off more often. While sleeping, Taruruto has been trying to get his hands on Mototori.
80	"Scoop Battle"; Transliteration: "Sukūpu Gassen" (Japanese: ㊙スクープ合戦)	Tooru Yamada	Yoshiyuki Suga	Sawako Yamamoto	March 22, 1992
The Ryoguchiya Newspaper created by Korekiyo is extremely popular in at school. Wanting to compete with Harako, Harako publishes The Harako Times, escorting in a newspaper boom. Honmaru and Taruruto also use magic to take photos. They publish a newspaper with a scoop and gain temporary popularity, but the photos taken start humiliating the others.
81	"Bon-Bonanza Tanukichi-kun" (Japanese: ぽんぽこタヌ吉くん)	Yoshihiro Oka	Aya Matsui	Hiroyuki Kawano	March 29, 1992
Taruruto gives a depressed Tanuki some Power-Upple juice. The tanuki later shows up at school to repay the favor, but also explains that his mother got sick from car exhaust fumes and his angry father tells him that he caused the accident.
82	"I Love Everyone" (Japanese: みんな愛しちゃう)	Junji Shimizu	Yoshiyuki Suga	Masayuki Uchiyama	April 5, 1992
Honmaru is caught by his jealous male friends as he approaches Iyona. He escapes with Taruruto's magic but the group's anger returns once the magic wears off. Harako shoots the arrow Aholeta-kun that he borrowed from Taruruto at Iyona,
83	"Fateful Volleyball Battle" (Japanese: 宿命のバレー決戦)	Hiroshi Shidara	Aya Matsui	Yoshitaka Koyama	April 12, 1992
The girls' volleyball finals of the prefectural tournament is coming up. Their opponents are Higashino Elementary School, meaning the three Kusuda sisters are returning for a rematch, and they have grown 8 centimeters since. Iyona trains alone, but when Honmaru finds out, he volunteers to coach Iyona and Ijigawa. Like the previous year, he also transforms into Emoto Marue, and Ijigawa temporarily transforms back into a boy during their coaching.
84	"Maddemboldening Samurai! I Choose You!!" (Japanese: 励まし侍！参上！！)	Kazuhito Kikuchi	Yoshiyuki Suga	Takayuki Gorai	April 19, 1992
Honmaru, who got a zero on his recent test, felt everyone's pitying gazes. Taruruto manages to cheer him up with the Encouragement Samurai. Taruruto uses it to cheer up Iyona, who lost her tropical fish, and Neyo, who's usually in a bad mood and missing Nezo.
85	"Ijigawa's Sibling Duty"; Transliteration: "Ijigawa no Kyōdai Jingi" (Japanese: 伊知川の兄妹仁義)	Akinori Yabe	Yoshiyuki Suga	Masami Abe	April 26, 1992
Ijigawa fights with her younger brother Bui. Her mother tells her to bare with it because she is older. She tells Mimora that she wants an older brother to protect her and is given a potato that will turn whoever eats it into a sibling. Ijigawa feeds Honmaru the potato and makes him her older brother, but never counted on him being just as much of a pain as Bui.
86	"Special Training with Personal Flovirtue-kun"; Transliteration: "Jinto-kun de Tokkun" (Japanese: じんとくんで特訓)	Tooru Yamada	Katsuyuki Sumisawa	Sawako Yamamoto	May 3, 1992
Honmaru rebukes Jabao for throwing trash on the street. They get into a fight, but Iyona sees them and misunderstands them. His mother tells him that "good things come from having good character", but Honmaru is not sure that Jabao has it.
87	"The Most Important Kiss"; Transliteration: "Ichiban Daiji na Kissu" (Japanese: 一番大事なキッス)	Yoshihiro Oka	Yoshiyuki Suga	Tetsuya Kumagai	May 10, 1992
Since Honmaru and his friends have graduated from Grade 6 and went on to middle school, they attend the cherry blossom-viewing festival. One of the events includes a talent show, where Honmaru gets competitive and tries to enter after seeing Harako's amazing magic trick. However, the main event the big obstacle course race and winner will get a kiss from the person of their dreams.

=== Films ===
Three theatrical films based on the anime were released. The first one premiered on March 9, 1991; the second one, Magical Taluluto: Burn! The Magic Battle of Friendship (まじかる★タルるートくん 燃えろ!友情の魔法大戦, Majikaru Taruruto-kun: Moero! Yūjō no Mahō Taisen), premiered on July 20 of that same year; and the third one, Magical Taluluto: My Favorite Takoyaki (まじかる★タルるートくん すき・すき▼*タコ焼きっ!, Majikaru Taruruto-kun: Suki Suki Takoyaki) premiered on March 7, 1992.

=== Video games ===
During the series' run, multiple video games based on the Magical Taruruto series were released in the early 1990s. These include games for the Famicom, Super Famicom, Game Boy, Mega Drive, and Game Gear.

The series was also represented in a few Shōnen Jump-based crossover games like Famicom Jump II: Saikyō no Shichinin, Cult Jump, and Jumputi Heroes.

Game	Details
Magical Taruruto-kun: Fantastic World!! Original release date(s): JP: March 21, 1991	Release years by system: 1991—Family Computer
Magical Taruruto-kun: Fantastic World!! Original release date(s): JP: March 21, 1991	Notes: Published by Bandai.
Magical Taruruto-kun Original release date(s): JP: June 15, 1991	Release years by system: 1991—Game Boy
Magical Taruruto-kun Original release date(s): JP: June 15, 1991	Notes: Published by Bandai.
Magical Taruruto-kun Original release date(s): JP: July 5, 1991	Release years by system: 1991—Game Gear
Magical Taruruto-kun Original release date(s): JP: July 5, 1991	Notes: Published by Tsukuda Ideal.
Magical Taruruto-kun: Magic Adventure Original release date(s): JP: March 28, 1992	Release years by system: 1992—Super Famicom
Magical Taruruto-kun: Magic Adventure Original release date(s): JP: March 28, 1992	Notes: Published by Bandai.
Magical Taruruto-kun Original release date(s): JP: April 24, 1992	Release years by system: 1992—Mega Drive
Magical Taruruto-kun Original release date(s): JP: April 24, 1992	Notes: Developed by Game Freak.; Published by Sega.; Directed by Ken Sugimori; Produced by Satoshi Tajiri; Music and sounds by Junichi Masuda.
Magical Taruruto-kun 2: Mahō Daibouken Original release date(s): JP: June 19, 1992	Release years by system: 1992—Family Computer
Magical Taruruto-kun 2: Mahō Daibouken Original release date(s): JP: June 19, 1992	Notes: Published by Bandai.
Magical Taruruto-kun 2: Rivar Zone Panic!! Original release date(s): JP: July 10, 1992	Release years by system: 1992—Game Boy
Magical Taruruto-kun 2: Rivar Zone Panic!! Original release date(s): JP: July 10, 1992	Notes: Published by Bandai.

== Reception ==
By November 2020, the manga had over 12.6 million copies in circulation.
