= Coji-Coji =

Japanese manga series

- Cover of manga volume 1.

コジコジ (Koji Koji)
- Genre: Fantasy, Supernatural
- Manga
- Written by: Momoko Sakura
- Published by: Sony Magazines
- Imprint: Sony Magazines Comics
- Magazine: Kimi to Boku
- Original run: December 1994 – May 1997
- Volumes: 3
- Anime television series

Sakura Momoko Gekijō Coji-Coji
- Directed by: Jun Takagi
- Music by: Hideo Shimazu
- Studio: Nippon Animation
- Original network: TBS
- Original run: October 4, 1997 – September 25, 1999
- Episodes: 100 + 1 special
- Video game

Sakura Momoko Gekijō Coji-Coji
- Developer: Psy-Gong
- Publisher: Marvelous Entertainment
- Genre: Party game
- Platform: Dreamcast
- Released: April 20, 2000
- Video game

CRA Sakura Momoko Gekijō Coji-Coji
- Publisher: NewGin
- Genre: Pachinko
- Platform: Arcade
- Released: 2010

Coji-Coji (コジコジ, Koji Koji) is a Japanese manga series by Momoko Sakura which was serialized in the magazine Kimi to Boku from December 1994 to May 1997. The manga was adapted into an anime television series titled Sakura Momoko Theater Coji-Coji (さくらももこ劇場 コジコジ, Sakura Momoko Gekijō Koji Koji) which aired from October 4, 1997, until September 25, 1999, on TBS in Japan. It features the titular Coji-Coji, the mysterious "Child of the Universe" with God-like powers. Coji-Coji has demonstrated its ability to erase the universe, fire powerful beams of energy, and live for millennia. Rather than use its powers, Coji-Coji spends its carefree days "eating, sleeping, and playing" in the land of Meruhen with a colorful cast of friends, including a talking snowman and a half fish half bird who can neither fly nor swim.

Much of the humor of the show is derived from Coji-Coji's blunt comments and social misunderstandings that border on callousness. Coji-Coji, however, is ultimately kind-hearted and helps its friends, if in unnoticed ways. Another running theme of the show is Coji-Coji's friends' ignorance of its God-like abilities. Coji-Coji makes no effort to conceal its powers, however: its friends simply never notice because it appears too simple and naive.

In addition to the anime series, there is a Dreamcast party game from Marvelous Entertainment based on the television series. The Dreamcast microphone was used to play the game. The title character is voiced by Shizuka Aoki, and it also features the vocal talents of Urara Takano and Katashi Ishizuka. A pachinko game titled CRA Sakura Momoko Theater Coji-Coji (CRAさくらももこ劇場コジコジ, Shī Aru Ei Sakura Momoko Gekijō Koji Koji) was also released by NewGin in 2010. At least four different versions have been released.

A stage show Stage of COJICOJI was performed from August 21–25, 2019.

== Characters ==
Coji-Coji (コジコジ)

Jiro (次郎)

Korosuke (コロ助)

Flower Head (頭花君)

Geran (ゲラン)

Dōdesu (ドーデス)

Shougatsu-kun (正月君)

Gosaku (吾作)

Ruru (ルル)

Suzy (スージー)

Buhi-buhi (ブヒブヒ)

Kettle-kun (やかん君)

Kame (カメ吉)

Pero-chan (ペロちゃん)

Gouta (ごうた)

Princess Umebachi (うめばち姫)

Hikoboshi (ひこぼし)

Johnny (ジョニー)

Harehare-kun (ハレハレ君)

Tommy (トミー)

Teruko (テル子)

Margarlet (マーガレット)

Zora (ゾラ)

Mūa (ムーア)

Piroro (ピロロ)

Fū (フー)

Usa-ko (うさ子)

Tanuki-kun (タヌキ君)

Houkyau (ハウキャウ)

Okame-chan (おかめちゃん)

Katsubū (カツブー)

Melanie (メラニー)

Sensei (先生)

Sarasara-kun (サラサラ君)

Torada Susumu (虎田進)

Hinako (ひな子)

Hatena-kun (ハテナ君)

Tiny girl (小さな女の子)

Orihime (おりひめ)

Spider mask (スパイダー仮面)

== List of episodes ==
1. Coji-Coji is Coji-Coji (コジコジはコジコジ) (Original Airdate: October 4, 1997)
2. Do your best!! Johnny-kun (がんばれ!!ジョニー君) (Original Airdate: October 11, 1997)
3. The Knowledgeable Grandpa (物知りじいさん) (Original Airdate: October 18, 1997)
4. Gran has been cheated (だまされたゲラン) (Original Airdate: October 25, 1997)
5. Let's write a letter (手紙を書こう) (Original Airdate: November 1, 1997)
6. Edokko's House of Clogs has arrived (江戸っ子の国ゲタ屋一家がやってきた) (Original Airdate: November 8, 1997)
7. To visit Atamahana-kun (頭花君のお見舞に行く) (Original Airdate: November 15, 1997)
8. Let's go and hunt for Mushrooms (キノコ狩りへ行こう) (Original Airdate: November 29, 1997)
9. The magical practice (まほうの練習) (Original Airdate: December 6, 1997)
10. The Mystical Shop has arrived (不思議屋がやってきた) (Original Airdate: December 13, 1997)
11. Today is Christmas (きょうはクリスマス) (Original Airdate: December 20, 1997)
12. The intruders of the Fairytale Country (メルヘンの国の悪者達) (Original Airdate: December 27, 1997)
13. Shougatsu-kun's Activity!! (正月君の活躍だ!!) (Original Airdate: January 3, 1998)
14. The night the Northern wind blows (北風の吹いた夜) (Original Airdate: January 10, 1998)
15. Yakan-kun's worries (やかん君の心配) (Original Airdate: January 17, 1998)
16. Shougatsu-kun's matchmaking session (Part 1) (正月君 お見合いをする（前編）) (Original Airdate: January 24, 1998)
17. Shougatsu-kun's matchmaking session (Part 2) (正月君 お見合いをする（後編）) (Original Airdate: January 31, 1998)
18. Let's go and meet Yasuhiko-kun (やすひこ君に会いに行こう) (Original Airdate: February 7, 1998)
19. Eh!? Johnny-kun is an idol!! (えっ!?ジョニー君がアイドルに!!) (Original Airdate: February 21, 1998)
20. Okame-chan's life (おかめちゃんのくらし) (Original Airdate: February 28, 1998)
21. Kameyoshi-kun abstains from tea (カメ吉君お茶断ちをする) (Original Airdate: March 7, 1998)
22. A very very tiny girl (小さい小さい女の子) (Original Airdate: March 14, 1998)
23. Gran bends the navel (ゲラン へそをまげる) (Original Airdate: March 21, 1998)
24. Shougatsu-kun's marriage ceremony (正月君の結婚式) (Original Airdate: March 28, 1998)
25. Sunshine doll, Teruko (てるてる坊主のテル子) (Original Airdate: April 4, 1998)
26. Knowledgeable Grandpa's neck (物知りじいさんの首からまる) (Original Airdate: April 11, 1998)
27. Recent Okame-chan (最近のおかめちゃん) (Original Airdate: April 18, 1998)
28. Susie's Life (スージーの生活) (Original Airdate: April 25, 1998)
29. Susie and Buhi-Buhi angered everyone (スージーとブヒブヒみんなに怒られる) (Original Airdate: May 2, 1998)
30. Long-life Granny (長生きばあさん) (Original Airdate: May 9, 1998)
31. Yakan-kun is injured (やかん君ケガをする) (Original Airdate: May 16, 1998)
32. Yakan-kun for one week (やかん君ザルとしての一週間) (Original Airdate: May 23, 1998)
33. Shougatsu-kun's married life (正月君の新婚生活) (Original Airdate: May 30, 1998)
34. A frog's way of life (カエルの生き方) (Original Airdate: June 6, 1998)
35. Moore's art of hypnosis (ムーアのさいみん術) (Original Airdate: June 13, 1998)
36. Dordes guides the lightning (ドーデス、かみなりの指導をする) (Original Airdate: June 20, 1998)
37. To be cool (クールのひけつ) (Original Airdate: June 27, 1998)
38. Orihime and Hikoboshi (おりひめとひこぼし) (Original Airdate: July 4, 1998)
39. Mystery of the beauty of the moonlit night (月夜の美女のナゾ) (Original Airdate: July 11, 1998)
40. The Failure of the Mystical Shop (不思議屋の失敗) (Original Airdate: July 18, 1998)
41. Going for a sea bath (海水浴へ行こう) (Original Airdate: July 25, 1998)
42. Teruko has been kidnapped (テル子、ゆうかいされる) (Original Airdate: August 1, 1998)
43. The storm has come!! (嵐が来るぞ!!) (Original Airdate: August 8, 1998)
44. Let's tidy up, Johnny-kun (さっぱりしようぜジョニー君) (Original Airdate: August 15, 1998)
45. Melanie, the magic-user (まほうつかいのメラニーさん) (Original Airdate: August 22, 1998)
46. Okame-chan leaves home (おかめちゃん家出する) (Original Airdate: August 29, 1998)
47. Tonight is the Tanuki Village Festival!! (今夜はタヌキ村のお祭りだ!!) (Original Airdate: September 5, 1998)
48. Sara-Sara-kun arrives (サラサラ君がやってきた) (Original Airdate: September 12, 1998)
49. Dordes's Castle's Big Pinch (ドーデスのお城 大ピンチ) (Original Airdate: September 19, 1998)
50. Let's organize a fashion show (ファッションショーをやろう) (Original Airdate: September 26, 1998)
51. Touhana-kun's cousin (頭花君のいとこ) (Original Airdate: October 3, 1998)
52. Jiroh's part-time job (次郎のバイト) (Original Airdate: October 10, 1998)
53. A flower blooms on Ume-chan's head (うめちゃんの頭に花が咲いた) (Original Airdate: October 17, 1998)
54. Learn to live on my own (ひとりぐらしをしたい) (Original Airdate: October 24, 1998)
55. Gifts from the Mystical Shop (不思議屋のおみやげ) (Original Airdate: October 31, 1998)
56. Knowledgeable Grandpa's frightful rumors (物知りじいさんの悪いウワサ) (Original Airdate: November 7, 1998)
57. Kameyoshi-kun's ages (カメ吉君のこうら) (Original Airdate: November 14, 1998)
58. The Truth behind Spider mask!? (スパイダー仮面の真実!?) (Original Airdate: November 21, 1998)
59. Harehare-kun's weather forecast (ハレハレ君の天気予報はずれる) (Original Airdate: November 28, 1998)
60. Coji-Coji becomes a member of Great Tanukids!? (コジコジがグレートタヌキーズのメンバーに!?) (Original Airdate: December 5, 1998)
61. A Hairstyle for Christmas (クリスマスのための髪型) (Original Airdate: December 12, 1998)
62. The Angel of the year (今年の天使様) (Original Airdate: December 19, 1998)
63. Shougatsu-kun's family expenses (正月君の家計ピンチ) (Original Airdate: December 26, 1998)
64. Pero-chan transfers school!? (ペロちゃんが転校!?) (Original Airdate: January 9, 1999)
65. What type of people are incredible (エライ人ってどんな人) (Original Airdate: January 16, 1999)
66. Sky for you (ゾラ、ぐれる) (Original Airdate: January 23, 1999)
67. Korosuke's parents have arrived (コロ助の両親やってくる) (Original Airdate: January 30, 1999)
68. The Winter General has arrived! (冬将軍がやってきた!) (Original Airdate: February 6, 1999)
69. The Reunion with Kameko-san (カメ子さんとの再会) (Original Airdate: February 13, 1999)
70. Moore's art of hypnosis 2 (ムーアのさいみん術2) (Original Airdate: February 20, 1999)
71. The night is too short (夜が短すぎるぞ) (Original Airdate: February 27, 1999)
72. I want to become a popular character! (人気キャラになろう!) (Original Airdate: March 6, 1999)
73. If I ride on a UFO...!! (UFOに乗ったら…!!) (Original Airdate: March 13, 1999)
74. Yakan-kun's frustrations (やかん君の悩み) (Original Airdate: March 20, 1999)
75. Sensei's secret (先生のひみつ) (Original Airdate: March 27, 1999)
76. Touhana-kun's cherry blossoms debut (頭花君のお花見デビュー) (Original Airdate: April 3, 1999)
77. Kame-God's reflection (カメ大明神反省する) (Original Airdate: April 10, 1999)
78. Congratulations, Hinako-san (ひな子さんのおめでた) (Original Airdate: April 17, 1999)
79. To the meadows of Spring (春の野原へ行こう) (Original Airdate: April 24, 1999)
80. Piroro and Fuu had a fight!? (ピロロとフーがけんか!?) (Original Airdate: May 1, 1999)
81. Thank you, Kame-chan (かあちゃんありがとう) (Original Airdate: May 8, 1999)
82. Jiroh's Love Island week (次郎の愛鳥週間) (Original Airdate: May 15, 1999)
83. The Son of the Mystical shop (不思議屋の息子) (Original Airdate: May 22, 1999)
84. Houkyau-kun arrives! (ハウキャウくんがやってきた!) (Original Airdate: May 29, 1999)
85. Teruko prays for rain (テル子、雨乞いをする) (Original Airdate: June 5, 1999)
86. Okame-chan's new product (おかめちゃんの新製品) (Original Airdate: June 12, 1999)
87. Shougatsu-kun is enthusiastic (正月くん、はりきる) (Original Airdate: June 19, 1999)
88. Knowledgeable Grandpa's book (物知りじいさんの本) (Original Airdate: June 26, 1999)
89. Nostradams arrives (ノストラダムスがやってきた) (Original Airdate: July 3, 1999)
90. Worrying over free time (ごうた、ひまで悩む) (Original Airdate: July 10, 1999)
91. The Sea of the summer night (夏の夜の海) (Original Airdate: July 17, 1999)
92. Gran's wife (ゲランの奥さん) (Original Airdate: July 24, 1999)
93. Nostradams's return (ノストラダムス、帰る) (Original Airdate: July 31, 1999)
94. Korosuke has a fever (コロ助、熱をだす) (Original Airdate: August 7, 1999)
95. Midsummer's night's test of courage (真夏の夜のきもだめし) (Original Airdate: August 14, 1999)
96. The Stormy day (大嵐の日) (Original Airdate: August 21, 1999)
97. Where will Knowledgeable Grandpa's neck be delivered? (物知りじいさんの首はどこまでのびる?) (Original Airdate: August 28, 1999)
98. Kame God's past (カメ大明神の過去) (Original Airdate: September 4, 1999)
99. Please help Katsubu! (カツブーを助けろ!) (Original Airdate: September 11, 1999)
100. Coji-Coji has disappeared!? (コジコジが消えた!?) (Original Airdate: September 18, 1999)
101. Shougatsu-kun and Hunako-san's new born baby (正月君とひな子さんのあかちゃん誕生) (Original Airdate: September 25, 1999)
