= Lost in Wrestling =

2015 Chinese-Hong Kong film by Casey Chan

- 搏击迷城
- Directed by: Casey Chan
- Screenplay by: Jason Lam; Casey Chan
- Produced by: Huang Si Qin; Bi Le Ge; Casey Chan
- Cinematography: Ngor Chi Wan
- Edited by: Pang Ching Hei; Poon Hung; Angel Sanchez-Covisa
- Music by: Jacques-Laurent Benech
- Release date: 5 June 2015 (China)
- Running time: 98 minutes
- Countries: China; Hong Kong
- Languages: Mandarin; Japanese; Cantonese
- Box office: CN¥480,000 (China)

Lost in Wrestling (Chinese: 搏击迷城), also known as 3D Lost in Wrestling, is a 2015 3D sports drama film directed by Casey Chan. A Chinese-Hong Kong co-production, it was released in China on 5 June 2015.

== Cast ==
- William Chan as Ruonan
- Karina Zhao as Naren
- Li Feier as Moon-moon
- Naoko Watanabe
- Siqin Gaowa
- Cheng Pei-pei
- Li Yixin
- Lau Siu Ming
- Lau Dan

== Reception ==
By 5 June 2015 the film had earned CN¥480,000 at the Chinese box office.

On The Hollywood Reporter, Elizabeth Kerr called the film "a swift, sentimental sports drama that flirts with camp but is saved by its own good nature."
