= Tokyo Daigaku Monogatari =

Japanese manga series

- Cover of the third tankōbon volume, featuring Haruka Mizuno (left) and Naoki Murakami (right)

東京大学物語 (Tōkyō Daigaku Monogatari)
- Genre: Romance
- Manga
- Written by: Tatsuya Egawa
- Published by: Shogakukan
- Magazine: Big Comic Spirits
- Original run: 1992 – 2001
- Volumes: 34
- Television drama
- Directed by: Imai Kazuhisa
- Original network: TV Asahi
- Original run: October 10, 1994 – December 19, 1994
- Original video animation
- Directed by: Jirō Fujimoto
- Music by: Tooru Yukawa
- Studio: Shinkūkan
- Released: 2004
- Runtime: 30 minutes per episode
- Episodes: 2
- Live-action film
- Directed by: Tatsuya Egawa
- Written by: Koto Nagata
- Studio: Soft On Demand
- Released: February 25, 2006
- Runtime: 105 minutes

Tokyo Daigaku Monogatari (Japanese: 東京大学物語; lit. "Tokyo University Story") is a Japanese manga series written and illustrated by Tatsuya Egawa. It was published in Shogakukan's Big Comic Spirits from 1992 to 2001, its chapters were collected in 34 tankōbon volumes. The story follows, high schooler Naoki Murakami who asks Haruka Mizuno to date him. They date while both worry about their upcoming university entrance examinations.

The manga has had over 20 million copies in circulation, making it one of the best-selling manga series.

== Plot ==
Naoki Murakami, a third-year student at Hakodate Koyo High School, is a man who has the triple threat of good looks, a sharp mind, and outstanding motor nerves. One day, Murakami is taken by his friend, Sano, to see the women's tennis club match at his high school. Murakami fell in love at first sight with Haruka Mizuno, who was playing a match at that time, and the next day he applied for a date, and the relationship started.

== Media ==
=== Manga ===
Written and illustrated by Tatsuya Egawa, Tokyo Daigaku Monogatari was serialized in Shogakukan's seinen manga magazine from 1992 to 2001. Shogakukan collected its chapters in thirty-four tankōbon volumes, released from July 30, 1993, to February 28, 2001.

=== Live-action film ===
A live-action film of the same name directed by Tatsuya Egawa and based on his manga was released in February 2006. The screenplay was written by Kotoe Nagata, and the film, produced by the Soft On Demand studio, starred Yoko Mitsuya, Kei Tanaka, Kazuki Namioka, Sasa Handa, Fujiko, Naoko Watanabe and Takeshi Masu.

== Reception ==
The manga has had Tokyo Daigaku Monogatari over 20 million copies in circulation.
