= NewGin =

Japanese gambling machine manufacturer

NewGin 株式会社ニューギン
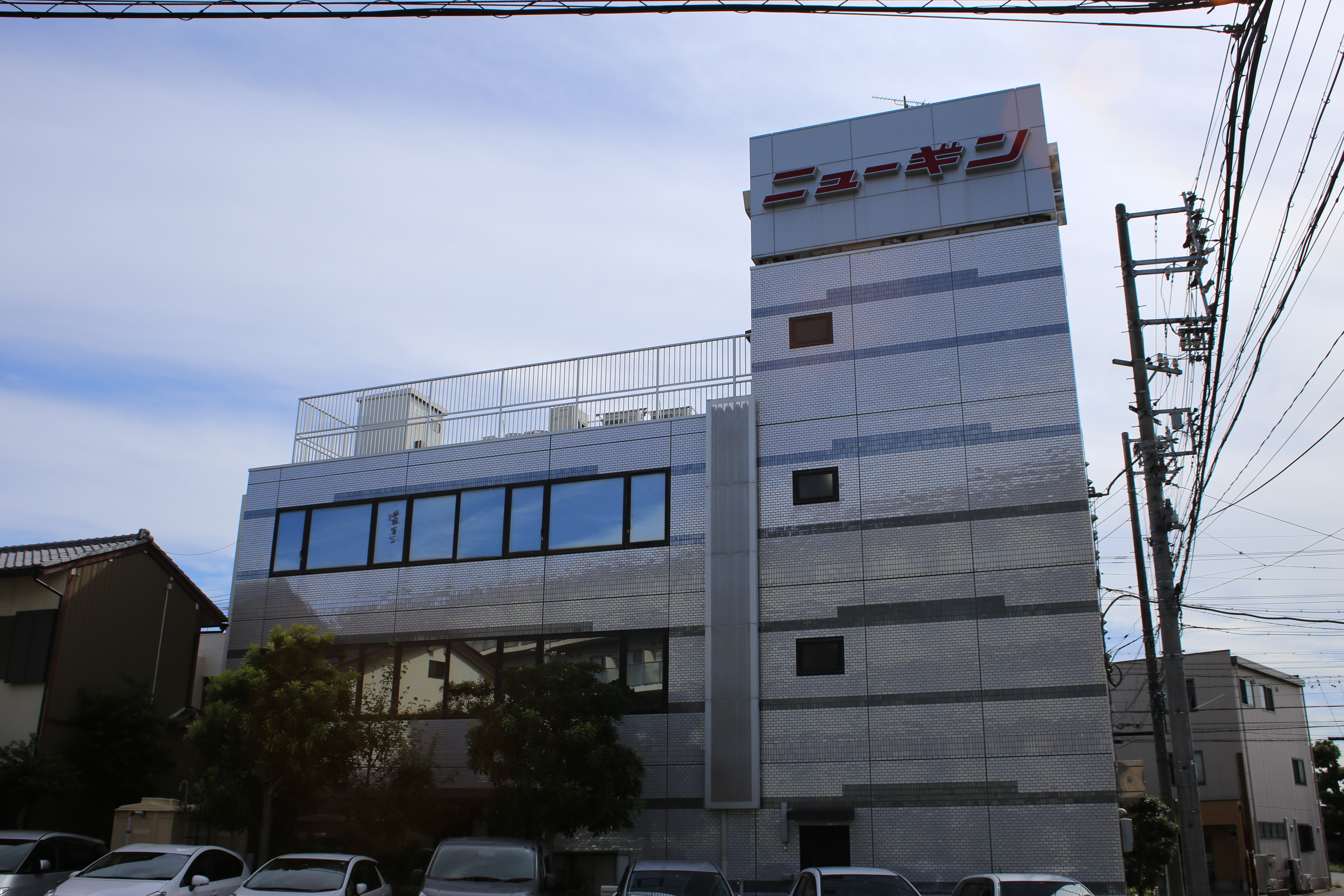
- NewGin's headquarters in Nagoya City, Japan
- Company type: KK (private)
- Industry: Gambling machine manufacturing
- Genre: Entertainment
- Predecessor: Marushin Bussan
- Founded: October 1949 (Marushin Bussan); May 1968 (NewGin)
- Headquarters: Nagoya, Japan
- Area served: Japan
- Key people: Yūji Arai (president)
- Products: Pachinko and Pachislot machines
- Revenue: ¥1.883 billion (December 2008, entire group)
- Number of employees: 280 (Note: The number of employees listed in the infobox above does not include those of any subsidiaries.)
- Subsidiaries: NewGin Hanbai; NewGin Advance; Shinsei; Aikoh; Shinko
- Website: www.newgin.co.jp

NewGin Co. Ltd. (株式会社ニューギン, Kabushiki Gaisha Nyūgin) is a privately owned Japanese manufacturer of pachinko and pachislot machines incorporated in May 1968 in Nagoya, Japan. The company slogan is "Serious Play" (あそびにマジメ, Asobi ni Majime).

== History ==
The company was founded in October 1949 as Marushin Bussan, then was reorganized into Marushin Bussan KK (丸新工業株式会社, Marushin Bussan Kabushiki Kaisha) in 1958. In May 1968, the company was again reorganized and incorporated under the current "NewGin" name.

The company only manufactured its machines for existing pachinko parlors until August 1986, when it opened its first company-owned parlor in Fukuoka. Since then, NewGin has opened many of its own pachinko and pachislot locations throughout Japan. In July 1988, NewGin completed its headquarters building in Nagoya, then established the subsidiary Aikoh in June 1990. A new manufacturing facility was completed in November 1991 in Kuwana, Mie Prefecture, and in 1995, the subsidiary Shinsei was established and a new Shinsei manufacturing plant was opened in Nannō.

A research and development facility was opened in 1996 in the Nagoya headquarters building, with a merchandise development department following in 1997, with a facility management department opening in 1998. NewGin Hanbai was established in 1999 as the marketing arm of the company. The facility management, general affairs, and accounting departments were combined into general business management department in 2000, and a new building was completed in Tokyo to house the new Tokyo development and management departments established in the same year.

In 2001, NewGin established its GB Advance subsidiary (now called NewGin Advance). The SP development and public relations planning departments were created in 2003 to handle the continued growth of the company. A new building near Ueno Station was completed in Ueno, Tokyo in 2005 to house the NewGin marketing department, the headquarters of NewGin Hanbai, and the Ueno offices of NewGin Advance. The subsidiary Shinko was opened in 2006, and the second Tokyo building was completed in 2009. A new Shinsei office at the Nannō was completed in 2010.

In January 2011, NewGin announced a pachinko game titled Future Boy Conan: Love and Courage and Adventure (未来少年コナン～愛と勇気と冒険と～, Mirai Shōnen Konan: Ai to Yūki to Bōken) based on Hayao Miyazaki's Future Boy Conan anime television series.
