= Chibi Maruko-chan =

Japanese manga series

- Cover of the first tankōbon volume, featuring Momoko Sakura (Maruko)

ちびまる子ちゃん
- Genre: Slice of life Comedy
- Manga
- Written by: Momoko Sakura
- Published by: Shueisha
- English publisher: Shueisha (digital)
- Imprint: Ribon Mascot Comics
- Magazine: Ribon
- Original run: August 1986 – October 2022
- Volumes: 18
- Anime television series
- Directed by: Yumiko Suda; Tsutomu Shibayama
- Music by: Nobuyuki Nakamura
- Studio: Nippon Animation
- Original network: FNS (Fuji TV)
- English network: IN: Nickelodeon; SEA: Animax Asia
- Original run: January 7, 1990 – September 27, 1992
- Episodes: 142
- Anime film
- Directed by: Yumiko Suda; Tsutomu Shibayama
- Written by: Momoko Sakura
- Music by: Nobuyuki Nakamura
- Studio: Nippon Animation
- Released: December 15, 1990
- Runtime: 94 minutes
- Anime film

Chibi Maruko-chan: My Favorite Song
- Directed by: Yumiko Suda; Tsutomu Shibayama
- Written by: Momoko Sakura
- Studio: Nippon Animation
- Released: December 19, 1992
- Runtime: 93 minutes
- Anime television series
- Directed by: Yumiko Suda (episodes 1-602); Jun Takagi (episode 602-present)
- Music by: Nobuyuki Nakamura; Shinji Kawahara (episodes 1-74)
- Studio: Nippon Animation
- Licensed by: NA: Crunchyroll
- Original network: FNS (Fuji TV)
- English network: IN: Nickelodeon India
- Original run: January 8, 1995 – present
- Episodes: 1468
- Television drama

Chibi Maruko-chan (live-action special)
- Studio: FCC; Fuji Television
- Original network: FNS (Fuji TV)
- Original run: April 18, 2006 – October 31, 2006
- Episodes: 2
- Television drama

Marumaru Maruko-chan
- Studio: Fuji Television
- Original network: FNS (Fuji TV)
- Original run: April 19, 2007 – February 28, 2008
- Episodes: 31
- Anime film
- Chibi Maruko-chan: A Boy from Italy (2015)

Chibi Maruko-chan (Japanese: ちびまる子ちゃん; lit. "Little Maruko-chan") is a manga series written and illustrated by Momoko Sakura. The series depicts the simple, everyday life of Momoko Sakura, a young girl everyone calls Maruko, and her family in suburban Japan in the year 1974. Maruko is a troublemaker, and every episode recounts Maruko's trouble and how she and her friends succeed in resolving the situation. The series is set in the former Irie District (入江町), Shimizu, now part of Shizuoka City, birthplace of its author.

The first story under the title "Chibi Maruko-chan" was published in the August 1986 edition of the manga magazine Ribon. Other semi-autobiographical stories by the author had appeared in Ribon and Ribon Original in 1984 and 1985, and were included in the first "Chibi Maruko-chan" tankōbon in 1987. The author first began writing and submitting strips in her final year of senior high school, although Shueisha (the publisher of Ribon and Ribon Original) did not decide to run them until over a year later. The author's intent was to write "essays in manga form"; many stories are inspired by incidents from her own life, and some characters are based on her family and friends. The nostalgic, honest and thoughtful tone of the strip led to its becoming popular among a wider audience.

Chibi Maruko-chan was adapted into an anime television series by Nippon Animation, which originally aired on Fuji Television and affiliated TV stations from January 7, 1990, to September 27, 1992. It has also spawned numerous games, animated films and merchandising, as well as a second TV series running from 1995 to the present. Maruko's style and themes are sometimes compared to the classic comic Sazae-san. In 1989, the manga tied to receive the Kodansha Manga Award for the shōjo category. As of 2006, the collected volumes of the manga had sold more than 31 million copies in Japan, making it one of the best-selling manga series.

== Themes ==
The trademark face fault of this series, in reaction to an awkward "don't know what to say" situation (or sometimes, embarrassment) is the sudden appearance of vertical lines (黒い線, kuroi sen) on a character's face, sometimes with an unexplained gust of wind blowing above that character's head.

== Characters ==
The series has a large number and variety of secondary and recurring characters, some inspired by people who Sakura met. Some of them debuted in the anime and others derive from the original manga. Following are descriptions of the main characters and family members that appear frequently in all chapters and episodes.

=== Sakura family ===
Back row, from left: Hiroshi, Sumire, and Tomozo; middle row, from left: Sakiko and Kotake; and front row: Momoko (a.k.a. Maruko)

Momoko "Maruko" Sakura (さくらももこ, Sakura Momoko; まる子 Maruko)
Voiced by: Tarako† (1990–2024), Kokoro Kikuchi (2024–present) (Japanese); Catherine Fu (English)
Portrayed by: Ei Morisako (2006 special), Ayaka Ito (2007 show)
The title character, Maruko (born May 8, 1965), is a nine-year-old third-grade student raised in a modest family of six. It is implied that the show is drawn by Maruko herself.
Sakiko Sakura (さくらさきこ, Sakura Sakiko)
Voiced by: Yūko Mizutani† (1990–2016), Machiko Toyoshima (2016–present) (Japanese); Lily Truncale (English)
Portrayed by: Mayuko Fukuda (2006 special), Maaya Murasaki (2007 show)
Maruko's older sister. Her birthday is March 21, 1962, making her 12 in the series.
Hiroshi Sakura (さくらひろし, Sakura Hiroshi)
Voiced by: Yūsaku Yara (Japanese); Jack Murphy (English)
Portrayed by: Katsumi Takahashi (2006 special), Masakazu Mimura (2007 show)
Maruko's father. He was introduced to Maruko's mother by her friend. His birthday is June 20, 1934, making him 40 years old during the series.
Sumire Sakura (さくらすみれ, Sakura Sumire)
Voiced by: Teiyū Ichiryūsai (Japanese); Muriel Hofmann (English)
Portrayed by: Michiko Shimizu (2006 special), Noriko Sakai (2007 show)
Maruko's mother. Her birthdate is May 25, 1934. It is revealed in one episode that her maiden name is Kobayashi.
Tomozou Sakura (さくら友蔵, Sakura Tomozō)
Voiced by: Kei Tomiyama† (1990–1992), Takeshi Aono† (1995–2010), Bin Shimada (2010–present) (Japanese); Simon Broad (English)
Portrayed by: Fuyuki Moto
Maruko's kind but absent-minded paternal grandfather, Hiroshi's father, and Sumire's father-in-law. His birthday is October 3, 1898, making him 76 in the series. The author has said that she used her own grandfather as the model for Tomozou, but that his personality is the opposite of Tomozou's.
Kotake Sakura (さくらこたけ, Sakura Kotake)
Voiced by: Yūko Sasaki (Japanese); Candice Moore (English)
Portrayed by: Yoshie Ichige (2006 special), Yoshiko Miyazaki (2007 show)
Maruko's paternal grandmother, Hiroshi's mother, and Sumire's mother-in-law. She is wise and knows what is good for the human body and wears a traditional kimono. She was born on April 4, 1902. Her name of Kotake was never known in the series until it appeared in a four-panel manga (yonkoma) on July 1, 2007.

== Media ==
=== Manga ===
The original Chibi Maruko-chan manga was serialized in the shōjo-oriented Ribon Magazine. 14 volumes were published from July 1987 to December 1996, with a 15th volume published in February 2003. In July 2007, a 4-frame version of Chibi Maruko-chan was published in every morning edition of several Japanese newspapers such as the Tokyo Shimbun and the Chunichi Shimbun.

The 16th volume of the manga was published on April 15, 2009, and 17th volume was issued on Dec 25, 2018, four months after Momoko Sakura's death.

The 18th volume was issued on Oct 25, 2022. The new manga was produced by Sakura's long-time assistant Botan Kohagi and other assistants at Sakura Production due to Sakura's death in 2018. The volume contains seven new chapters, and are based on stories that Sakura originally created for the Chibi Maruko-chan television anime.

In 2026, the series became licensed digitally in English on Shueisha's Manga Million platform.

==== Spin-offs ====
A spin-off manga by Momoko Sakura titled Nagasawa-kun (永沢君; ながさわくん) focuses on the character Kimio Nagasawa on High School, was published on the magazine Shogakkan's Big Comic Spirits from January 1993 and May 1995. It was made into a live-action drama, premiering on Tokyo Broadcasting System Television on April 1, 2013.

A square-headed parody version of manga Chibi Maruko-chan titled Chibi Shikaku-chan (ちびしかくちゃん) was published on Shueisha's Grand Jump magazine from October 19, 2016.

=== Anime ===
==== First series ====
Chibi Maruko-chan originally aired on Fuji Television and affiliated TV stations. 142 episodes were broadcast, from January 1990 to September 1992. Maruko was voiced by Tarako; other voice actors included Kappei Yamaguchi and Hideki Saijo. Original manga author Momoko Sakura wrote the teleplay for most episodes. The first series was directed by Yumiko Suda, animated by Masaaki Yuasa (who later directed Mind Game in 2004), while the music was composed by Nobuyuki Nakamura. The series attained a TV viewer rating of 39.9% on October 28, 1990, the highest rating ever attained by an animated TV series in Japan. The outro song Odoru Ponpokorin became a hit and was interpreted by several artists including the KinKi Kids and Captain Jack. The series was exported throughout Asia and was especially popular in Taiwan. In addition, 65 episodes were dubbed into Arabic (called Maruko Assagheera, which means Little Maruko), where it garnered attention from people of all ages. It also aired in Germany with the same title as the original and was broadcast by RTL II, Super RTL and Jetix. It aired weekdays on Nick India in India.
To celebrate the franchise's 10th anniversary in 1996, Pony Canyon released a special LaserDisc in Japan. One of the segments was a compilation of international opening and ending themes from the original series. Both the LaserDisc sleeve and the ending of the segment credit the 1994 English production to Ocean Studios in Vancouver, Canada. This is the only footage from the dub to surface. Actress Teryl Rothery has listed her involvement with the show on her resume.
Voicebox Productions, a Canadian voice acting company also located in Vancouver, has listed a Chibi Maruko-chan pilot for Pioneer Entertainment and Studio B Productions on their website since the early 2000s. No other information on this project is known. As Voicebox only came into existence in 1999, it's likely this was unrelated to the aforementioned Ocean dub.

Opening theme:

1. "Yume Ippai" (ゆめいっぱい "Full of Dreams") by Yumiko Seki (eps. 1–142)

Ending themes:

1. "Odoru Pompokolin" (おどるポンポコリン) by B.B.Queens (eps. 1-66)
2. "Hashire Shoujiki-mono" (走れ正直者 "Run, Honest Person") by Hideki Saijo (eps. 67–142)

==== Second series ====
A second series debuted on Fuji Television and affiliated TV stations in January 1995, airing on Sundays in the 6:00 pm time slot, before Sazae-san at 6:30 pm. The series is directed by Jun Takagi and Nobuyuki Nakamura, like the first series, composes the music. The majority of the voice actors from the first series reprised their roles. The first 219 episodes were written by Momoko Sakura, however, she had supervised the episode screenplays from episode 220 up until her death in 2018. In Spain, the show is available via VOD on the website of Neox's children's block, Neox Kidz. On TV Japan, which is available in the United States and Canada, the second series (starting with the episodes broadcast in 2009) now broadcasts weekly in Japanese. In Latin America, is distributed by The Japan Foundation, the dub was produced in Mexico and broadcast on several local, public and other private television networks.

On April 25, 2020, it was announced that the second series would be suspended due to the COVID-19 pandemic. On June 14, 2020, it was announced that it would resume on June 21, 2020. As of 14 January 2024, Crunchyroll has started to stream the series from episode 1419 in the US, Canada, the Philippines and Singapore.

Opening themes:

1. "Ureshii Yokan" (うれしい予感 "Feeling Happy") by Marina Watanabe (eps. 1–73), Chibi Maruko-chan (Tarako) (ep. 28)
2. "Humming ga Kikoeru" (ハミングがきこえる "Hear the Humming") by Kahimi Karie (eps. 74–179)
3. "Odoru Ponpokorin" (おどるポンポコリン) by ManaKana & Shigeru Izumiya (eps. 180–253)
4. "KinKi no Yaruki Man Man Song" (KinKiのやる気まんまんソング) by KinKi Kids (eps. 254–294)
5. "Odoru Ponpokorin" (おどるポンポコリン) by B.B.Queens (eps. 295–746; 793–807; 888–953)
6. "Odoru Ponpokorin" (2010 Version) (おどるポンポコリン（2010年バージョン）) by Kaela Kimura (eps. 747–792)
7. "Odoru Ponpokorin" (25th Anniversary Version) (おどるポンポコリン（ちびまる子ちゃん誕生25周年バージョン）) by B.B. Queens (eps. 808–887)
8. "Odoru Ponpokorin" (2014 Version) (おどるポンポコリン（2014年バージョン）) by E-Girls (eps. 954–1046)
9. "Odoru Ponpokorin" by Sakurako Ohara (Special 19)
10. "Odoru Ponpokorin" by Golden Bomber (eps. 1047–1190)
11. "Odoru Ponpokorin" by Momoiro Clover Z (eps. 1191–1511)
12. "Odoru Ponpokorin" by Ado (eps. 1512–)

Ending themes:

1. "Hari-kiri Jiisan no Rock 'n' Roll" (針切じいさんのロケン・ロール) by Hitoshi Ueki (eps. 1-27, 29–73)
2. "Hari-kiri Jiisan no Rock 'n' Roll" by Grandfather (Takeshi Aono) and the children (ep. 28)
3. "Akke ni Torareta Toki no Uta" (あっけにとられた時のうた) by Tama (eps. 74–130, 132–179)
4. "Yume Ippai Shin Version" (ゆめいっぱい（新バージョン） "Full of Dream (New Version)")
5. "Jaga Buttercorn-san" (じゃがバタコーンさん) by ManaKana (eps. 180–230)
6. "Chibi Maruko Ondo" (ちびまる子音頭) by ManaKana (eps. 231–340)
7. "Kyuujitsu no Uta (Viva La Viva)" (休日の歌（Viva La Vida）) by Delighted Mint (eps. 341–416)
8. "Uchū Dai Shuffle" (宇宙大シャッフル "Big Shuffle in Outer Space") by Love Jets (eps. 417–481)
9. "Arara no Jumon" (アララの呪文) by Chibi Maruko-chan with Bakuchu Mondai (eps. 482–850)
10. "Hyaku-man Nen no Shiawase!!" (100万年の幸せ!! "100 Thousand Years of Happiness!!") by Keisuke Kuwata (ep. 851 – special 21)
11. "Kimi o Wasurenai yo" (キミを忘れないよ "I Won't Forget You") by Sakurako Ohara (special 19)
12. "Susume Nonsense" (すすめナンセンス) by PUFFY (eps. 1119–1216)
13. "Itsumo no Fūkei" (いつもの風景) by Kazuyoshi Saito (eps. 1217–)
14. "Pappaparadise" (パッパパラダイス) by Hikaru Utada

==== Live action ====
A live action series was shown on Fuji Television in 2006. The series was created to commemorate Chibi Maruko-chan's 15th anniversary and had three episodes, each two hours. All costumes and hairstyles are faithful to the original manga. A Taiwanese live-action adaptation was also made begin airing on March 13, 2017.

Both of the second television series and the live action series were broadcast in 1080i HDTV.

==== Films ====
- Chibi Maruko-chan (Toho, 1990)
- Chibi Maruko-chan: My Favorite Song (Toho, 1992)
- Chibi Maruko-chan: A Boy from Italy (2015)
- Chibi Maruko-chan: The Fantastic Notebook (2022; Chinese 3DCG film)

=== Video games ===
All the Game Boy titles (which consists of minigames) were developed by KID and published by Takara. The other titles were published by different companies like Namco, Konami, Epoch and Banpresto.

- Chibi Maruko-chan: Okozukai Daisakusen (Game Boy, 1990)
- Chibi Maruko-chan: Uki Uki Shopping (Famicom, 1991)
- Chibi Maruko-chan 2: Deluxe Maruko World (Game Boy, 1991)
- Chibi Maruko-chan: Harikiri 365-Nichi no Maki (Super Famicom, 1991)
- Chibi Maruko-chan 3: Mezase! Game Taishou no Maki (Game Boy, 1992)
- Chibi Maruko-chan 4: Korega Nihon Dayo Ouji Sama (Game Boy, 1992)
- Chibi Maruko-chan: Quiz de Piihyara (PC Engine, 1992)
- Chibi Maruko-chan: Waku Waku Shopping (Mega Drive, 1992)
- Chibi Maruko-chan: Maruko Deluxe Quiz (Arcade/Game Boy/Neo-Geo, 1995)
- Chibi Maruko-chan: Mezase! Minami no Island!! (Super Famicom, 1995)
- Chibi Maruko-chan no Taisen Puzzle Dama (Sega Saturn, 1995)
- Chibi Maruko-chan: Maruko Enikki World (PlayStation, 1995)
- Chibi Maruko-chan: Go Chounai Minna de Game Dayo! (Game Boy Color, 2001)
- Chibi Maruko-chan DS Maru-chan no Machi (Nintendo DS, 2009)
- Chibi Maruko-chan (Nintendo 3DS, 2016)
- Chibi Maruko-chan: Dream Stage iOS/Android, 2016

=== Stage ===
As part of the project to commemorate the 35th anniversary of the original work, it was announced in October 2021 that the first stage of this work, "Chibi Maruko-chan The Stage", will be produced, scheduled to be performed at the end of 2022. Nelke Planning is in charge of planning and production. In August 2022, it was announced that the title would be "High School Days" and that it would be performed at the Galaxy Theatre from December 15 to December 25.

Main Cast
Character name	Actor
Kazuhiko Hanawa	Hiroki Sana
Sueo Maruo	Taiki Sagawa
Noritaka Hamasaki	Yunosuke Matsushima
Shigeru Fujiki	Yusuke Yada
Kimio Nagasawa	Naganori Sato
Taro Tomita	Motohisa Harashima
Futoshi Kosugi	Yusaku Kawasaki
Tsuyoshi Yamane	Ryoga Ishikawa
Kenichi Ohno	Shohei Hashimto
Satoshi Sugiyama	GAKU

== Reception ==
In TV Asahi's poll of the Top 100 Anime, Chibi Maruko-chan came in 15th.

== Notes ==
- Kenta Hasegawa (former Japanese international football player). Momoko Sakura, the author of the manga, created a character called Kenta-kun who occasionally makes an appearance. He loves football and is a classmate of Chibi Maruko. This character was created after Hasegawa. Sakura and Hasegawa attended the same primary school during the same period.
