= List of Hunter × Hunter OVA episodes =

Cover of the first DVD volume of Hunter × Hunter OVA.

Hunter × Hunter is a series of three original video animations (OVAs) produced by Nippon Animation that serve as a direct continuation of the 1999 Hunter × Hunter television series which is, itself, based on a manga of the same name. The story follows Gon Freecss, a young boy who discovers his estranged father, Ging, is a legendary "Hunter"—an elite member of humanity. Gon leaves home to pass the rigorous Hunter Examination and follow in his father's footsteps.

Following the conclusion of the 62-episode television broadcast in 2001 Nippon Animation produced 30 OVA episodes to continue the animated adaptation of the original manga series from where the television broadcast ended. Because they function as a direct narrative extension, these episodes are numbered sequentially in guides starting at episode 63. None of the OVAs have received an official English release.

The first Hunter x Hunter, the OVA Series, comprising episodes 63 to 70, was directed by and released across four VHS and DVD volumes between January 17 and April 17, 2002. It features the opening theme "Pale Ale" and the ending theme "Carry On", both performed by Kenichi Kurosawa.

Yukihiro Matsushita directed Hunter × Hunter: Greed Island was made up of episodes 71 - 79 and released across four volumes between February 19 and May 21, 2003. It features the opening theme "Pray" by Wish* and the ending theme "Popcorn" by Mikuni Shimokawa.

Fourteen episodes (79 - 92) were contained in Hunter × Hunter: G.I. Final. Released across seven volumes between March 3 and August 18, 2004, this largest body of animation was directed by Makoto Sato It features the opening theme "Believe in Tomorrow" and the ending theme "Moshimo Kono Sekai de Kimi to Boku ga Deaenakattara" by Sunflower's Garden.

Toshihiko Sahashi composed the background music for all three series.

== Episodes ==
=== Hunter × Hunter: Original Video Animation ===
No.	Title	Original release date
63	"Spider × Corpse × Fake"; Transliteration: "Kumo × Shitai × Feiku" (Japanese: 蜘蛛×死体×フェイク)	January 17, 2002
Kurapika, Gon, Killua and Leorio find out that the Spiders are still alive and that the bodies were fake. The mafia has given up on chasing the Spiders, but Gon and Killua decide to continue to help Kurapika.
64	"Friends × Costumes × Hell's Ear"; Transliteration: "Nakama × Hensō × Jigoku Mimi" (Japanese: 仲間×変装×地獄耳)	January 17, 2002
Kurapika's team set out to find the Phantom Troupe. The Troupe decides to stay and find the chain-user after sensing the location of the nen-copied scarlet eyes.
65	"Pursuit × Escape × Spiders on the Run"; Transliteration: "Tsuiseki × Tōbō × Hashiridashita Kumo" (Japanese: 追跡×逃亡×走り出した蜘蛛)	February 20, 2002
A double chase ensues when the Troupe notice Gon and Kurapika following from behind while they chase after the nen-copy of the scarlet eyes. Three of the Spiders confront Gon and Kurapika who are hiding in the shadows.
66	"Hostages × Insignificant Bugs × Communicated Emotions"; Transliteration: "Hitojichi × Mushikera × Tsutawatta Omoi" (Japanese: 人質×虫けら×伝わった思い)	February 20, 2002
Killua swaps with Kurapika just in time, Gon and Killua are captured by the Phantom Troupe. The Spiders kill Squala and take his memories of Kurapika. Meanwhile, Gon's group ends up at the hotel where Leorio and Melody have set up a plan.
67	"Report × Darkness × Released Chain"; Transliteration: "Jihō × Kurayami × Hanatareta Kusari" (Japanese: 時報×暗闇×放たれた鎖)	March 20, 2002
Gon and Killua unsuccessfully attempted an escape. The boss of the Troupe, Chrollo Lucilfer is captured by Kurapika.
68	"Dispute × Break-up × Swinging Fist"; Transliteration: "Chōhatsu × Bunretsu × Furiageta Kobushi" (Japanese: 挑発×分裂×振り上げた拳)	March 20, 2002
Kurapika has captured the leader of the Phantom Troupe, Chrollo Lucilfer. Negotiations are made to exchange him for Killua and Gon.
69	"Exchange × Revenge × Judgment Chain"; Transliteration: "Kōshō × Fukushū × Rissuru Kusari" (Japanese: 交渉×復讐×律する鎖)	April 17, 2002
The exchange is made and the prophecy is fulfilled for Hisoka.
70	"Feelings × Hopelessness × The Spider's Downfall"; Transliteration: "Omoi × Dannen × Hikisakareta Kumo" (Japanese: 想い×断念×引き裂かれたクモ)	April 17, 2002
Since Chrollo's Nen ability was constricted, Hisoka lost interest in the battle with him and revealed that the tattoo of his spider status was fake. Pakunoda transfers her memories to six Troupe members and as a result dies for not obeying the chain's rules.

=== Hunter × Hunter: Greed Island ===
No.	Title	Original release date
71	"Auction × Plan × 80 Percent"; Transliteration: "Kyōbai × Sakusen × 80 Pāsento" (Japanese: 競売×作戦×80パーセント)	February 5, 2003
Kurapika contracts a fever while Killua and Gon attend the Southernpiece Auction.
72	"Electricity × Aura × Ultimate Technique"; Transliteration: "Denki × Ōra × Hissatsuwaza" (Japanese: 電気×オーラ×必殺技)	February 5, 2003
Killua and Gon train individually to develop special techniques in order to prove themselves strong enough to play Greed Island. Killua develops an electricity based Hatsu while Gon develops power combining all the basic Nen abilities to create a Hatsu.
73	"Ren × Tests × Everyone's Journey"; Transliteration: "Ren × Shiren × Sorezore no Ippo" (Japanese: 練×試練×それぞれの一歩)	March 5, 2003
Gon and Killua take and pass Tsezguerra's exam for entering Greed Island. They part with Leorio and travel to Battela's mansion, where they enter the game.
74	"Start × Spell × Town of Prizes"; Transliteration: "Sutāto × Jumon × Kenshō no machi" (Japanese: スタート×呪文×懸賞の街)	March 5, 2003
During the game's introduction, Gon finally finds out the contents of the memory card Ging left him. Together Killua and Gon take their first steps into Greed Island. Killua and Gon go to the town of Antokiba and get their first cards. During the game, they see a man whom entered Greed Island with them die from a mysterious explosion.
75	"Invitation × List × Show Me Rock!"; Transliteration: "Kanyū × Risuto × Saisho wa Gū!" (Japanese: 勧誘×リスト×最初はグー!)	March 19, 2003
Gon and Killua are invited to join a player's alliance but decline and go on their own. They win their first card in a "Rock, Paper, Scissors" competition.
76	"Take × Taken × Card Hell"; Transliteration: "Toru × Torareru × Kādo Jigoku" (Japanese: 奪る×奪られる×カード地獄)	March 19, 2003
Gon and Killua continue playing, but the card they won gets stolen by some more experienced players. Members of the Phantom Troupe start to play the game with their stolen copy.
77	"Bandit × Monster × Biscuit"; Transliteration: "Sanzoku × Kaibutsu × Bisuketto" (Japanese: 山賊×怪物×ビスケット)	April 16, 2003
Gon and Killua head toward the city of Masadora, where spell-cards can be purchased. They meet monsters, bandits, and more. Biscuit Krueger follows them and gets frustrated with their lack of skill.
78	"Training × Raw Ore × Scissor Hands"; Transliteration: "Shūgyou × Genseki × Shizā Hanzu" (Japanese: 修行×原石×シザーハンズ)	April 16, 2003
Gon, Killua and Biscuit are attacked by Binolt, a bounty hunter. The trio subdues Binolt and Biscuit gives him a chance to live, using him to train the boys during a two-week period.

=== Hunter × Hunter: G.I. Final ===
No.	Title	Original release date
79	"Masadora × Big Strides × Bomb Devil"; Transliteration: "Masadora × Yakushin × Bakuhatsu Ma" (Japanese: マサドラ×躍進×爆発魔)	February 18, 2004
Gon and Killua learn many abilities from their new teacher, Biscuit Krueger, digging through mountains as training exercises.
80	"Nen Removal × New Year × Hunter Exam"; Transliteration: "Jonen × Shinnen × Hantā Shiken" (Japanese: 除念×新年×ハンター試験)	February 18, 2004
Killua exits the game to re-take the hunter exam. He easily becomes a hunter in the first exam by knocking out all the other examinees. Gon still trains his abilities with Biscuit while Gensuru, the Bomber, destroys the player's alliance.
81	"An Encounter × Chrollo × The Gold Dust Girl"; Transliteration: "Sōgū × Kuroro × Kinpun Shōjo" (Japanese: 遭遇×クロロ×金粉少女)	March 3, 2004
Gon and Killua start using their abilities to obtain cards, which they discover is easier due to Biscuit's training program.
82	"Contact × Razor × A United Front"; Transliteration: "Sesshōku × Reizā × Kyōdōsensen" (Japanese: 接触×レイザー×共同戦線)	March 3, 2004
Gon and Killua continue playing and have more than 50 cards (out of the 100 required to win the game). The Bomber and his team have 96 cards while a united front rises to prevent them from winning the game by monopolizing one of the cards they still need.
83	"Meeting Again × Hisoka × Sporting Event"; Transliteration: "Saikai × Hisoka × Supōtsu Shōbu" (Japanese: 再会×ヒソカ×スポーツ勝負)	April 7, 2004
Gon, Killua and Biscuit go with the united team to find information about a card no player has been able to obtain. They find the location of the card, but fail to defeat the game master Razor and his Fifteen Devils in a series of sports related one-on-one contests. Gon, Killua, and Biscuit organize a stronger team to tackle the challenges, which includes Hisoka and Tsezguerra.
84	"Lighthouse × 8 People × Game Master"; Transliteration: "Tōdai × Hachinin × Gēmu Masutā" (Japanese: 灯台×8人×ゲームマスター)	April 7, 2004
After the team is gathered, they easily pass the sport contests, but still must defeat Razor in an 8v8 game of deadly nen-charged dodgeball.
85	"Jan × Ken × Rock"; Transliteration: "Jan × Ken × Gū" (Japanese: ジャン×ケン×グー)	April 28, 2004
Gon uses his new abilities in the dodgeball game. Killua's hands are heavily injured. On Razor's team only he remains, facing Gon, Killua and Hisoka.
86	"Unite × Impact × Bungee Gum"; Transliteration: "Gōtai × Shōgeki × Banjī Gamu" (Japanese: 合体×衝撃×バンジーガム)	April 28, 2004
Gon's team wins and they get the card Razor was guarding. The game master tells Gon about Ging. Hisoka goes his own way.
87	"Struggle × Pinch × War Declaration"; Transliteration: "Kyōtō × Pinchi × Sensenfukoku" (Japanese: 共闘×ピンチ×宣戦布告)	June 2, 2004
A fight against the Bomber is imminent. Gon trains his timing, while Killua and Biscuit form a battle plan.
88	"Stakeout × Preparation × Battle Start"; Transliteration: "Harikomi × Junbi × Chisen Kaishi" (Japanese: 張り込み×準備×血戦開始)	June 2, 2004
Gon has trained a lot and is prepared to fight. Meanwhile, Battera's secret lover has died and the reward for completing the game is canceled. The battle between Gon, Killua, and Biscuit against Gensuru and his comrades begins.
89	"Biscuit × Killua × New Special Attack"; Transliteration: "Bisuke × Kirua × Shin Hissatsuwaza" (Japanese: ビスケ×キルア×新必殺技)	June 30, 2004
Killua and Biscuit win their fights. Gon fights Gensuru.
90	"Energy × Gyo × Little Flower"; Transliteration: "Kiryoku × Gyō × Hitonigiri no Kayaku (Ritoru Furāwa)" (Japanese: 気力×凝×一握りの火薬)	June 30, 2004
Gon is still fighting with Gensuru and loses one hand.
91	"Cruelty × Determination × Climax"; Transliteration: "Reikoku × Ketsui × Saishū Kyokumen (Kuraimakusu)" (Japanese: 冷酷×決意×最終局面)	August 18, 2004
Gon wins against Gensuru and takes all his cards. They heal everyone, including Gon's severed hand, and reach a total of 99 cards. An island wide quiz event for the last card is announced.
92	"Game × Everything Cleared × Finale"; Transliteration: "G.I (Gēmu) × Zen Kuri × Daidanen" (Japanese: G·I×全クリ×大団円)	August 18, 2004
Everybody in Greed Island participates in a quiz. Gon scores the highest with 87 correct out of 100 questions, wins card #00, and gets instructions to go to Greed Island Castle. There he meets 2 other game masters who give him his reward, a small binder which can be used to take three Greed Island cards out into the "real" world. With Killua and Biscuit they finish the game and leave Greed Island. Once outside Gon and Killua use the card Accompany to fly to the player with the codename "Nigg," which Gon believes is an alias of his father, Ging.
