= Tatsuya Egawa =

Japanese manga artist and film director

- Born: March 8, 1961 (age 65); Chikusa-ku, Nagoya, Aichi, Japan
- Occupations: Manga artist Film director Screenwriter
- Known for: Magical Taruruto; Golden Boy; Tokyo Daigaku Monogatari

Tatsuya Egawa (江川 達也, Egawa Tatsuya; born March 8, 1961) is a Japanese manga artist and film director. He is probably best known for his Golden Boy manga series, which debuted in 1992. Egawa is known for his drawings of over-the-top facial expressions and for always crediting the staff of his creations, even on the covers (crediting the works to "Egawa and his assistants"). Kōsuke Fujishima, who is known as the creator of Oh My Goddess, was once one of Egawa's assistants.

== Early life ==
Egawa was born in Chikusa-ku, Nagoya, Aichi Prefecture, Japan. He has a degree in mathematics and taught junior high mathematics for five months before transitioning into the manga industry.

== Career ==
Egawa moved to Tokyo to work under manga artist Hiroshi Motomiya for four months in 1983. His big break came when his story "Don't Give Up" won Comic Morning's open contest. His first serialized series was Be Free! for Comic Morning, where he was recommended by Hiroshi.

Egawa has cited manga artists Go Nagai and Shigeru Mizuki as influences.

=== Directing ===
He has also written and directed live-action pornographic films. In 2003 he started an association with the Japanese adult video (AV) studio Soft On Demand (SOD) under its president Ganari Takahashi. His first video with the company, My Yearning Female Private Teacher (憧れの家庭教師, Akogare no katei kyōshi), was released August 8, 2003, as SOD production SDDM-311, and marked the AV debut of actress Reika Yoshizawa. His second work for SOD, My Yearning Office Lady (憧れのオフィスレディ, Akogare no ofisu redi) (SDDM-336), starring Ai Kurosawa, came out in October 2003. A third video, released in February 2004, My Yearning Combatant (憧れの戦闘員, Akogare no sentō in) (SDDM-404), with actress Shizuku Tsukino, contained some bondage elements.

In 2006, Egawa directed his first live-action film, Tokyo University Story, based on his manga of the same name. The film, produced by SOD, was released theatrically in Japan in February 2006. Four years later, he directed his second theatrical feature, King Game (KING GAME キングゲーム, Kingu gemu) about a group of ten people mysteriously trapped in a room to play the "King Game", a Japanese version of "Truth or Dare". The film, from an original story by Egawa, made its debut in Tokyo's Shinjuku district at K's Cinema on August 28, 2010. One of the actresses in the film is Nana Natsume, a former AV actress who began working for SOD in late 2003.

== Manga works ==
- Be Free!
- Dead Man
- ONE-ZERO-NINE
- The Last Man
- Take-chan and Papa
- Golden Boy
- Happy Boy
- Magical Taruruto
- Tokyo Daigaku Monogatari
- Russo-Japanese War Story
- Genji Monogatari
- Golden Boy II ~ Sasurai no O-Benkyō Yarō: Geinō-kai Ōabare-hen

== Filmography ==
- Akogare no katei kyōshi, 2003 (adult video)
- Akogare no ofisu redi, 2003 (adult video)
- Akogare no sentō in, 2004 (adult video)
- Tokyo University Story, 2006
- King Game (KING GAME キングゲーム), 2010
