= Momoko Sakura =

Japanese manga artist (1965–2018)

Sakura Momoko
- さくら ももこ
- Born: Miki Miura (三浦美紀); May 8, 1965; Shimizu-ku, Shizuoka, Japan
- Died: August 15, 2018 (aged 53)
- Occupation: Manga artist
- Known for: Coji-Coji, Chibi Maruko-chan
- Call sign: JI2EIT

Miki Miura (三浦美紀, Miura Miki), known professionally as Momoko Sakura (さくら ももこ, Sakura Momoko) (May 8, 1965 – August 15, 2018) was a Japanese manga artist and writer. She was best known as the creator of the long-running manga Chibi Maruko-chan.

== Biography ==
Momoko Sakura was born on May 8, 1965. She was passively open about her private life, recounting anecdotes of events that she experienced in published essays. When she was nine years old, she was a survivor of the 1974 Tanabata torrential downpour. She voluntarily remained anonymous until her death.

Sakura made her debut as an artist in 1984. Her most well-known series, Chibi Maruko-chan, was first published in Ribon from 1986 to 1996, and continued in serialization until 2022. The series was based on her own childhood and was set in 1974 in suburban Japan. Initially, the books were autobiographical and referenced real events such as the aforementioned flood, but later incorporated fictional events into the stories. An anime series based on Chibi Maruko-chan aired from 1990 to 1992 while the current second series, which debuted in 1995, continues to this day. Sakura was the lyricist of most of the themes in both shows.

The original manga would receive a spinoff titled Nagasawa-kun in 1993 and was serialised in Big Comic Spirits. Sakura would later write a sequel to Chibi Maruko-chan titled Hitorizumo initially in the form of a 2005 essay detailing her life leading up to her start as a manga artist. Hitorizumo was later adapted to an autobiographical manga in 2006, with 42 chapters irregularly serialised in Big Comic Spirits. The comic was republished in Ribon following her death.

From 1989 to 2012, Sakura wrote various essays that were compiled to various books. These essays were characterised by illustrations accompanying the text and would reference her experiences in the past and the present day in great detail. Her writing would later move to a Line blog in May 2015, which she kept updated until her death. It was later maintained by her company, until Lineblog was closed in June 2023. Sakura also made the more surreal fantasy series Coji-Coji, which ran from 1997 to 1999. She also worked with Marvelous Interactive on creating the Dreamcast title Sakura Momoko Gekijō Coji-Coji, and with Nintendo on creating the Game Boy Advance title Sakura Momoko no Ukiuki Carnival. In 2005, she designed the characters for the Xbox 360 title Every Party.

Music has often appeared in the work of Sakura, from the references of Yellow Magic Orchestra in the early collections of Chibi Maruko-chan and the shout-outs to Shibuya-kei in the surreal world of Coji-Coji.

== Death ==
Momoko Sakura died from breast cancer on August 15, 2018, at the age of 53. Before her death, she wrote lyrics about musician Kazuyoshi Saito for him to sing. Saito used these for his 2019 song "Itsumo no Fūkei" (いつもの風景), an ending theme of the Chibi Maruko-chan anime. She was survived by her second husband.

== Awards ==
In 1989, she received the Kodansha Manga Award in the Shōjo category for Chibi Maruko-chan.
