= Doujinshi =

Japanese self-published print works

Doujinshi (同人誌), also romanized as dōjinshi, is the Japanese term for self-published print works, such as magazines, manga, and novels. Part of a wider category of doujin (self-published) works, doujinshi are often derivative of existing works and created by amateurs, though some professional artists participate in order to publish material outside the regular industry.

Groups of doujinshi artists refer to themselves as a sākuru (サークル, circle). Several such groups actually consist of a single artist: they are sometimes called kojin sākuru (個人サークル, personal circles).

Since the 1980s, the main method of distribution has been through regular doujinshi conventions, the largest of which is called Comiket (short for "Comic Market") held in the summer and winter in Tokyo's Big Sight. At the convention, over 20 acres (81,000 m^{2}) of doujinshi are bought, sold, and traded by attendees.

== Etymology ==
The term doujinshi is derived from doujin (同人, literally "same person"; used to refer to a person or people with whom one shares a common goal or interest) and shi (誌; a suffix generally meaning "periodical publication").

== History ==
The pioneer among doujinshi was Meiroku zasshi (明六雑誌), published in the early Meiji period (since 1874). While not a literary magazine, Meiroku Zasshi nevertheless played a big role in spreading the idea of doujinshi. The first magazine to publish doujinshi novels was Garakuta Bunko (我楽多文庫), founded in 1885 by writers Ozaki Kōyō and Yamada Bimyo. Doujinshi publication reached its peak in the early Shōwa period, becoming a mouthpiece for the creative youth of that time. Created and distributed in small circles of authors or close friends, doujinshi contributed significantly to the emergence and development of the shishōsetsu genre. During the postwar years, doujinshi gradually decreased in importance as outlets for different literary schools and new authors arose. Their role was taken over by literary journals such as Gunzo, Bungakukai, and others. One notable exception was Bungei Shuto (文芸首都; lit. Literary Capital), which was published from 1933 until 1969. Few doujinshi magazines survived with the help of official literary journals. Haiku and tanka magazines are still published today.

It has been suggested that technological advances in the field of photocopying during the 1970s contributed to an increase in publishing doujinshi. During this time, manga editors were encouraging manga authors to appeal to a mass market, which may have also contributed to an increase in the popularity of writing doujinshi.

During the 1980s, the content of doujinshi shifted from being predominantly original content to being mostly parodic of existing series. Often called aniparo, this was often an excuse to feature certain characters in romantic relationships. Male authors focused on series like Urusei Yatsura, and female authors focused on series like Captain Tsubasa. This coincided with the rise in popularity of Comiket, the first event dedicated specifically to the distribution of doujinshi, which had been founded in 1975.

By February 1991, there were some doujinshi creators who sold their work through supportive comic book stores. This practice came to light when three managers of such shops were arrested for having a lolicon doujinshi for sale.

Over the last decade, the practice of creating doujinshi has expanded significantly, attracting thousands of creators and fans alike. Advances in personal publishing technology have also fueled this expansion by making it easier for doujinshi creators to write, draw, promote, publish, and distribute their works. For example, some doujinshi are now published on digital media. Furthermore, many doujinshi creators are moving to online download and print-on-demand services, while others are beginning to distribute their works through American channels such as anime shop websites and specialized online direct distribution sites. In 2008, a white paper on the otaku industry was published, this estimated that gross revenue from sales of doujinshi in 2007 were 27.73 billion yen, or 14.9% of total otaku expenditure on their hobby.

Symbol of the Doujin Mark License

To avoid legal problems, the dōjin mark (同人マーク) was created. A license format inspired by Creative Commons licenses, the first author to authorize the license was Ken Akamatsu in the manga UQ Holder!, released on August 28, 2013, in the magazine Weekly Shōnen Magazine.

== Distribution ==
Due to the self-publishing nature of doujinshi, distribution tends to fall on the creator to facilitate. Doujinshi conventions make it easier for creators to distribute or sell their works at a larger scale directly to fans. Other forms of distribution also include doujinshi shops and websites.

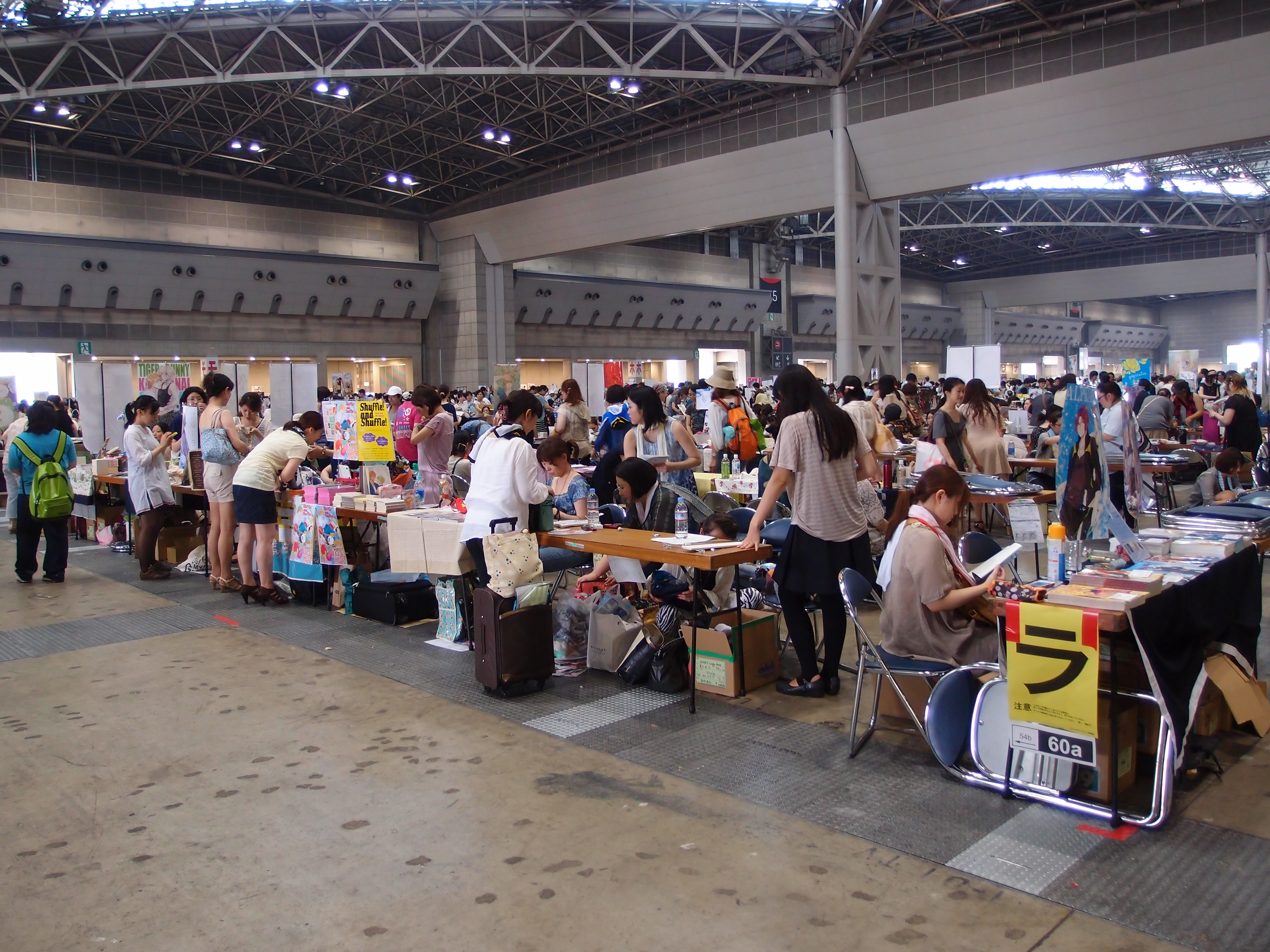
Doujinshi booths at Comiket 84

Since many bookstores only sell from registered commercial publishers, doujinshi shops allow for the sale of self-published physical doujinshi. Examples include shops such as Comic Toranoana. The creation of doujinshi by a single person has made it so that monetization must also be the responsibility of the creator. This has allowed for a distribution system separate from mainstream manga publishing. Additionally, creators of doujinshi are more likely to also monetize other forms of self-made content, such as music or lyrics. Some creators choose to instead sell doujinshi online, whether it be on their own website or in a digital marketplace.

Doujinshi circles also encourage community among creators, allowing for the exchange of information and self made works, primarily taking place at conventions such as Comiket. Conventions such as this one are an example of spaces in which Japanese sentiments encourage fanmade or self-published works.

Other collections of doujinshi available for viewing outside of monetization also exist. In 2009, Meiji University opened a dōjin manga library, named "Yoshihiro Yonezawa Memorial Library" to honor its alumni in its Surugadai campus. It contains Yonezawa's own doujinshi collection, comprising 4137 boxes, and the collection of Tsuguo Iwata, another famous person in the sphere of doujinshi.

=== Comiket ===
Comiket is the world's largest comic convention. It is held twice a year (summer and winter) in Tokyo, Japan. The first CM was held in December 1975, with only about 32 participating circles and an estimated 600 attendees. About 80% of these were female, but male participation in Comiket increased later. In 1982, there were fewer than 10,000 attendees, this increased to over 100,000 attendees as of 1989, and over half a million people in recent years. This rapid increase in attendance enabled doujinshi authors to sell thousands of copies of their works, earning a fair amount of money with their hobby.

== Categories ==
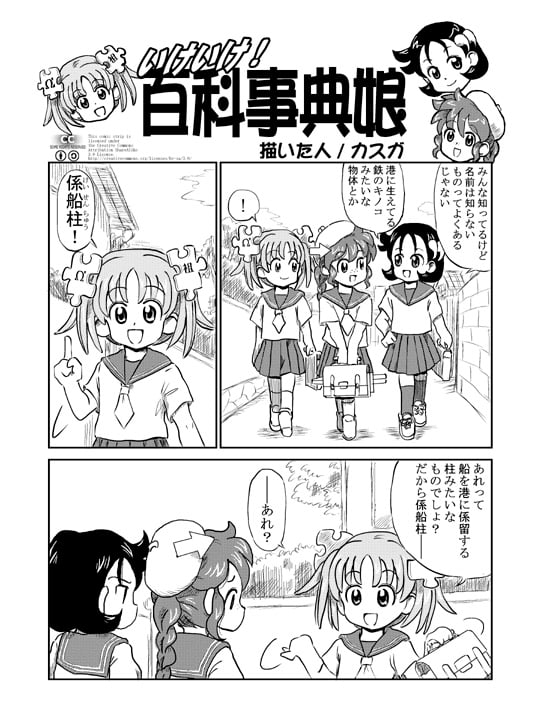
A page from a doujinshi manga about Wikipe-tan

Like their mainstream counterparts, doujinshi are published in a variety of genres and types. However, due to the target audience, certain themes are more prevalent, and there are a few major division points by which the publications can be classified. It can be broadly divided into original works and aniparo—works which parody existing anime and manga franchises.

As in fanfics, a very popular theme to explore is non-canonical pairings of characters in a given show (for doujinshi based on mainstream publications). Many such publications contain yaoi or yuri (stories containing same-sex romance) themes, either as a part of non-canon pairings, or as a more direct statement of what can be hinted by the main show. These works can be considered within the genre of BL, or Boys' Love, which also has roots within doujinshi communities.

Another category of doujinshi is furry or kemono, often depicting homosexual male pairings of anthropomorphic animal characters and, less often, lesbian pairings. Furry doujinshi shares some characteristics with the yaoi and yuri genres, with many furry doujinshi depicting characters in erotic settings or circumstances, or incorporating elements typical of anime and manga, such as exaggerated drawings of eyes or facial expressions.

A major part of doujinshi, whether based on mainstream publications or original, contains sexually explicit material, due to both the large demand for such publications and absence of restrictions official publishing houses have to follow. Indeed, often the main point of a given doujinshi is to present an explicit version of a popular show's characters. Such works may be known to English speakers as "H-doujinshi", in line with the former Japanese use of letter H to denote erotic material. The Japanese usage, however, has since moved towards the word ero, and so ero manga (エロ漫画) is the term almost exclusively used to mark doujinshi with adult themes. Sometimes they will also be termed "for adults" (成人向け, seijin muke) or 18-kin (18禁) (an abbreviation of "forbidden to minors less than 18 years of age" (18歳未満禁止, 18-sai-miman kinshi)). To differentiate, ippan (一般; , "general", from the general public it is suitable for) is the term used for publications absent of such content.

Most doujinshi are commercially bound and published by doujinshi-ka (doujinshi authors) who self-publish through various printing services. Copybooks, however, are self-made using xerox machines or other copying methods. Few are copied by drawing by hand. Comiket is well known, but there are various doujinshi events in Japan. Authors avoid the word "sale(販売)" and prefer the word "distribution(頒布)". However, there is also a system for putting doujinshi into circulation, which is generally referred to as "consignment(委託)".

Not all category terms used by English-language fans of doujinshi are derived from Japanese. For example, an AU doujinshi is one set in an alternate universe.

== Legality ==
Many doujinshi are derivative works that are produced without the permission of the original creator, a practice that has existed since the early 1980s. Doujinshi are considered shinkokuzai under Japanese copyright law, meaning that doujinshi creators cannot be prosecuted unless a complaint is made by the holders of the copyrights they have violated. In 2016, Prime Minister of Japan Shinzo Abe affirmed that doujinshi "don't compete in the market with the original works and don't damage the original creators' profits, so they are shinkokuzai." Copyright holders take an unofficial policy of non-enforcement towards the doujinshi market, as it is seen as having a beneficial impact on the commercial manga market: it creates an avenue for aspiring manga artists to practice, and talented doujinshi creators are often recruited by publishers. Salil K. Mehra, a law professor at Temple University, hypothesizes that doujinshi market causes the manga market to be more productive, and that strict enforcement of copyright law would cause the industry to suffer.

=== Notable cases ===
In 1999, the Pokémon doujinshi incident happened, where the author of an erotic Pokémon manga was prosecuted by Nintendo. This created a media furor as well as an academic analysis in Japan of the copyright issues around doujinshi. At this time, the legal analysis seemed to conclude that doujinshi should be overlooked because they are produced by amateurs for one-day events and not sold in the commercial market. In 2006, an artist selling an imagined "final chapter" for the series Doraemon, which was never completed, was given a warning by the estate of author Fujiko F. Fujio. His creation apparently looked confusingly similar to a real Doraemon manga. He ceased distribution of his doujinshi and sent compensation to the publisher voluntarily. The publisher noted at this time that doujinshi were not usually a cause of concern for him. The Yomiuri Shimbun noted, "Fanzines don't usually cause many problems as long as they are sold only at one-day exhibitions," but quoted an expert saying that due to their increasing popularity a copyright system should be set up.

In 2020, the Intellectual Property High Court ordered a doujinshi sharing website to pay ¥2.19 million to a creator whose doujinshi were uploaded to the website without their consent. The file sharing site claimed that as the doujinshi was a derivative work it was not protected by copyright law, though the court ruled that there was insufficient evidence to classify the doujinshi as an illegally derivative work. The ruling was noted by commentators as potentially broadening rights for doujinshi creators under commercial law.

== Impact ==
John Oppliger of AnimeNation stated in 2005 that creating doujinshi is largely popular with Japanese fans, but not with Western fans. Oppliger claimed that because Japanese fans grow up with anime and manga "as a constant companion", they "are more intuitively inclined" to create or expand on existing manga and anime in the form of doujinshi. Since Western fans experience a "more purely" visual experience as most Western fans cannot understand the Japanese language, the original language of most anime, and are "encouraged by social pressure to grow out of cartoons and comics during the onset of adolescence", most of them usually participate in utilizing and rearranging existing work into anime music videos.

In most Western cultures, doujinshi is often perceived to be derivative of existing work, analogous to fan fiction and almost completely pornographic. This is partly true: doujinshi are often, though not always, parodies or alternative storylines involving the worlds of popular manga, game or anime series, and can often feature overtly sexual material. However, there are also many non sexually explicit doujinshi being created as well. The Touhou Project series for example, is known to be notable for the large amount of doujinshi being produced for it that are not pornographic in nature. Some groups releasing adults-only themed materials during the annual Touhou only event Reitaisai in 2008 were only estimated at 10%.

== Notable artists ==
=== Individuals ===
- Yoshitoshi Abe has published some of his original works as doujinshi, such as Haibane Renmei. He cited the reason as, essentially, not wanting to answer to anyone about his work, especially because he saw it as so open-ended.
- Ken Akamatsu, creator of manga such as Love Hina and Negima, continues to make doujinshi which he sells at Comiket under the pen-name Awa Mizuno.
- Kiyohiko Azuma, creator of Azumanga Daioh and Yotsuba& started out doing doujinshi using the pen-name A-Zone.
- Nanae Chrono, creator of the manga Peacemaker Kurogane, has published multiple Naruto doujinshi, most of a yaoi nature.
- Kazushi Hagiwara, creator of Bastard!!, and his group Studio Loud in School have published popular Bastard!!-related doujinshi such as Wonderful Megadeth!, as well as various Capcom-related doujinshi.
- Masaki Kajishima, creator of Tenchi Muyo! Ryo-Ohki, has long used the doujinshi format to release additional information about his series. His doujinshi contain interviews, early scripting drafts, storyboards as well as short stories further developing the characters and setting of his works.
- Kazuhiko Katō, also known as Monkey Punch, creator of Lupin III began as a doujinshi artist.
- Kodaka Kazuma, creator of Kizuna, Rotten Teacher's Equation (Kusatta Kyōshi no Hōteishiki), Love Equation (Renai Hōteishiki) and Border among others, has published several parody yaoi doujinshi as K2 Company of Prince of Tennis, Fullmetal Alchemist, and Tiger and Bunny, as well as an original doujinshi series called 'Hana to Ryuu' (Flower and Dragon).
- Rikdo Koshi, creator of the manga Excel Saga, originally started out as a doujinshi artist.
- Yun Kōga, a longtime published manga artist and creator of two well-known BL series, Earthian and Loveless has published doujinshi for series such as Gundam Wing and Tiger and Bunny.
- Sanami Matoh, creator of FAKE, has published parody yaoi doujinshi (mostly of One Piece) and original doujinshi as East End Club.
- Maki Murakami, creator of Gravitation and Gamers' Heaven. Her circle Crocodile Ave. created Remix Gravitation AKA Rimigra and Megamix Gravitation, which were extremely sexually graphic.
- Minami Ozaki, creator of the boy's love manga Zetsuai, is an extremely prolific doujinshi creator. She authored numerous yaoi doujinshi before her debut as a professional artist, most notably featuring characters from the soccer manga Captain Tsubasa. The main characters of her manga Zetsuai strongly resemble the main characters of her Captain Tsubasa doujinshi. Ozaki continued to release doujinshi about her own professional manga, often including sexual content that could not be published in Margaret, the young girls-oriented manga magazine in which Zetsuai was serialized.
- Yukiru Sugisaki, creator of D.N.Angel and The Candidate for Goddess, started as a doujinka. She released doujinshi about King of Fighters, Evangelion, etc.; all were gag doujinshi.
- Rumiko Takahashi, creator of Ranma ½ and Inuyasha, made doujinshi before she became a professional artist.
- Yoshihiro Togashi, creator of YuYu Hakusho and Hunter x Hunter, has authored doujinshi such as Church!.
- Hajime Ueda, the creator of Q•Ko-chan and the comic adaptation of FLCL.
- Nobuteru Yūki sells doujinshi based on his animated works under his pen-name "The Man in the High Castle".
- Yana Toboso used to be a yaoi doujinka before she authored Black Butler, which explained why there are some notable BL hints throughout the series.
- Sunao Minakata, the illustrator of Riddle Story of Devil, is a regular doujinka, especially in girls' love theme. Usually makes Touhou doujinshi and has collaborated with other known-for-Touhou-works-popular artists, such as Banpai Akira.
- Yūko Tsuno, creator of Reizōko (冷蔵庫)
- Nio Nakatani, creator of the popular yuri manga series Bloom Into You, first became known for her doujinshi work, particularly those based on Touhou Project.

=== Online ===
- Bleedman, creator of the online Powerpuff Girls Doujinshi, Grim Tales From Down Below, and Sugar Bits.
- Fred Gallagher, creator of the Megatokyo series, as well as the in-development series Warmth. His Megatokyo co-creator and former writer, Rodney "Largo" Caston, can also be considered one, though Caston has since left the business.
- Daniel Kim, creator of the Cardcaptor Sakura parody Tomoyo42's Room, has written and illustrated several doujinshi, all of which are hosted at the Clone Manga collective.
- Jesús García Ferrer (Jesulink) created Raruto, a Spanish Naruto doujinshi published online.
- Fabio Yabu produced the sentai spoof Combo Rangers.

=== Circles ===
- 07th Expansion, creators of both Higurashi no Naku Koro ni and Umineko no Naku Koro ni.
- Clamp started out as a doujinshi group of 11 known as Clamp Cluster.

== See also ==
- Dōjin music
- Dōjin soft
- Niigata Comic Market
- Otaku

=== Related concepts ===
- Amateur press association
- Fanzine
- Fan fiction
- Minicomic
- Self-publishing
