= Yun Kōga =

Japanese manga artist (born 1965)

- 木村 理沙
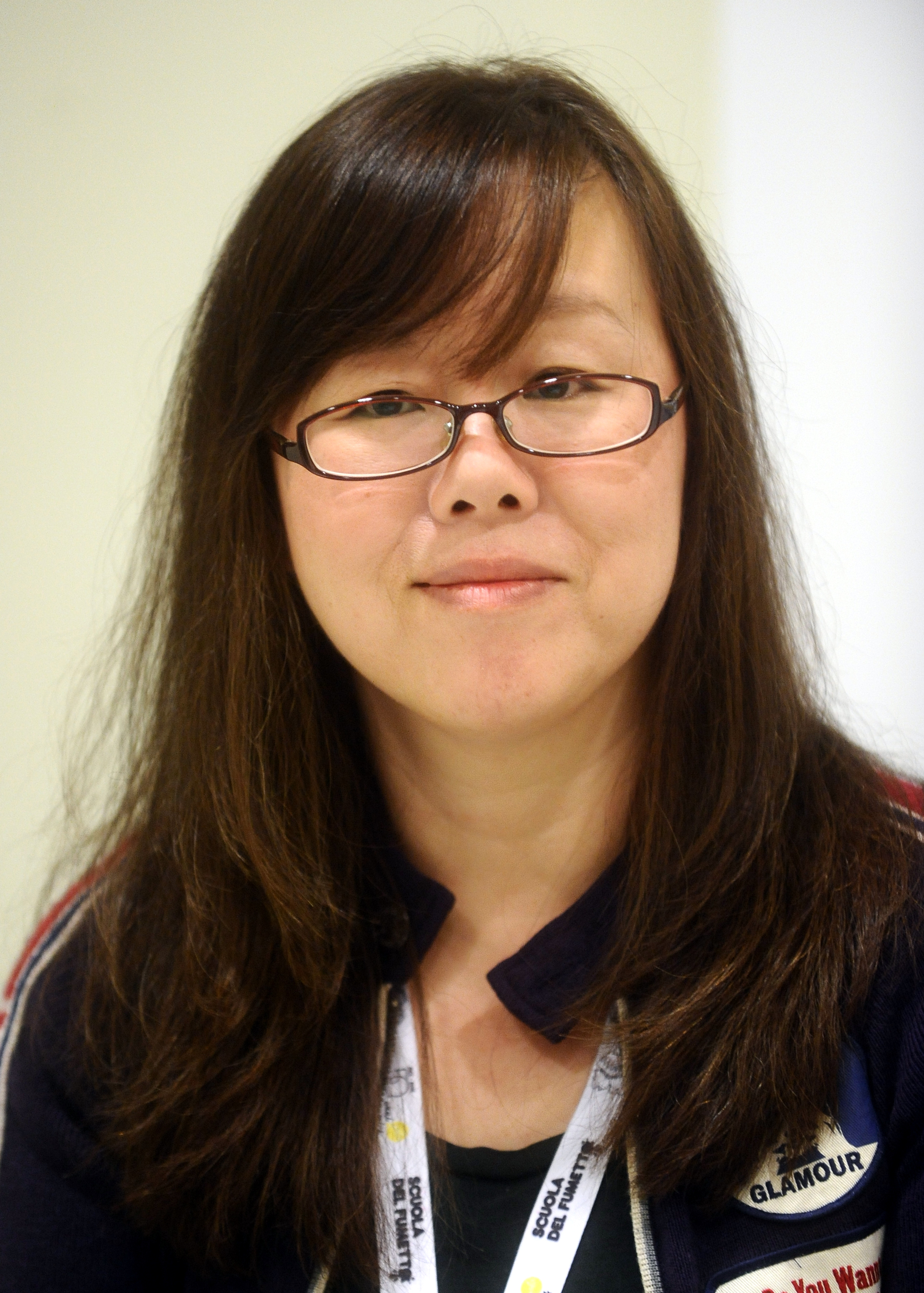
- Kōga at Lucca Comics & Games 2016
- Born: Risa Kimura; July 9, 1965 (age 61); Shinagawa, Tokyo, Japan
- Occupation: Manga artist
- Known for: Earthian, Loveless
- Spouse: Tatsuneko
- Children: 1
- Website: yunk.jp

Risa Kimura (木村 理沙, Kimura Risa; born July 9, 1965), better known by her pen name Yun Kōga (高河 ゆん, Kōga Yun) is a Japanese manga artist. She is married to fellow manga artist Tatsuneko, from whom he took the name of Risa Yamada (山田 理沙, Yamada Risa). She is a graduate of Mita Senior High School, Tokyo. She currently lives in Setagaya, Tokyo with her husband and daughter.

== Profile ==
She began her career as a dōjinshi artist creating dōjinshi for works such as Saint Seiya, Captain Tsubasa and Maōden.

She debuted in a commercial magazine with the original work Metal Heart (serialized in Kobunsha's Comic VAL from November 1986). After her debut, she continued to contribute on numerous dōjin works. However, the later disbanding of a dōjin circle, Yajō Teikoku, she had founded with Maki Chikura, led to her taking numerous breaks from her commercial works. Due to this, there were incomplete works penned by her during this period.

During her years in middle school, she had been a fan of Masami Kurumada's manga series Ring ni Kakero, Fūma no Kojirō, Saint Seiya (all serialized in Weekly Shōnen Jump) and B't X (serialized in Monthly Shōnen Ace), sending Kurumada numerous fan letters asking to meet him, after which Kurumada finally agreed, inviting her to his workplace.

When asked about her pen name in an interview in the September 2006 issue of Puff, she responded that she had originally thought of making it Jun Kōga, but subsequently changed it to Yun Kōga.

Among her noted works is Loveless, which has been serialized in Monthly Comic Zero Sum since 2002 and is ongoing, as well as her work Tenshichō (天使庁). She has also worked as an illustrator on the noted literary magazine Faust.

In 2007, she contributed the character designs to the Sunrise anime series, Mobile Suit Gundam 00.

== Manga works ==
=== Unfinished/current works ===
- Loveless (LOVELESS) 2001–
- Tenshichō (天使庁) 2002–2007
- Kill Me (KILL ME) 2003–2006
- Satō-kun and Tanaka-san -The blood highschool (佐藤くんと田中さん -The blood highschool) 2007–
1. ISBN 978-4-7580-5601-4
- Kurumada Suidoken Hero of Heroes (車田水滸伝 HERO OF HEROES) 2013–
1. ISBN 978-4-2532-3741-3

=== Completed works ===
- Riddle Story of Devil (Akuma no Riddle) 2012–2016
- Earthian (アーシアン) 1987–1995
- Saffron Zero Beat (サフラン・ゼロ・ビート) 1988–1991 ISBN 978-4-403-61326-5
- Kodomotachi wa Yoru no Juunin (子供たちは夜の住人) 1988–1990
1. ISBN 978-4-253-15621-9
2. ISBN 978-4-253-15622-6
- Rōrakaizā (ローラカイザー) 1988–1993
1. ISBN 978-4-253-07542-8
2. ISBN 978-4-253-07543-5
3. ISBN 978-4-253-07544-2
4. ISBN 978-4-253-07491-9
- REN AI - Renai - (REN-AI 恋愛) 1989–1999
1. ISBN 978-1-929090-92-1
2. ISBN 978-1-929090-93-8
3. ISBN 978-1-929090-94-5
- You're My Only Shinin' Star (You're My Only Shinin' Star 君はぼくの輝ける星) 1989–1990 ISBN 978-4-06-360740-6
- Kiga Ichizoku (飢餓一族) 1992–1993 ISBN 978-4-05-600065-8
- Gestalt (超獣伝説ゲシュタルト, Chōjū Densetsu Geshutaruto) 1992–2001
- Yōsei Jiken (妖精事件) 1993–1999
1. ISBN 978-4-06-360854-0
2. ISBN 978-4-06-360855-7
3. ISBN 978-4-06-360856-4
4. ISBN 978-4-06-360857-1
- La Vie en Rose (LA VIE EN ROSE) 1995–1998
1. ISBN 978-4-253-15364-5
2. ISBN 978-4-253-15365-2
- Crown of Love (恋愛-CROWN-) 1998–2002
- Hapipuri (はぴぷり) 1999–2001 ISBN 978-4-05-602709-9
- Earthian Gaiden Himitsu no Hanazono (アーシアン外伝 秘密の花園) 2002 ISBN 978-1-59816-009-3
- Bite Me

=== Incomplete works ===
- B-gata Doumei (B型同盟) 1988–1989
1. ISBN 978-4-04-852224-3
- Genji (源氏) 1988–1995
1. ISBN 978-4-403-61179-7
2. ISBN 978-4-403-61188-9
3. ISBN 978-4-403-61204-6
4. ISBN 978-4-403-61227-5
5. ISBN 978-4-403-61242-8
6. ISBN 978-4-403-61280-0
7. ISBN 978-4-403-61351-7
8. ISBN 978-4-403-61370-8
- Yajō Teikoku (夜嬢帝国) 1988–1989
1. ISBN 978-4-253-07492-6
- Arisu in Wonderland (ありす IN WONDERLAND) 1989–1992
1. ISBN 978-4-334-80258-5
2. ISBN 978-4-334-80192-2
- Vanpu - Kyūketsu no To - (ヴァンプ-吸血の徒-) 1989–1995
- Hurricane Hill (ハリケーン・ヒル) 1997
- Chronicle (クロニクル) 1998
1. ISBN 978-4-7575-0098-3

=== Short works ===
- Metal Heart (メタルハート) 1986
- Mind Size (マインドサイズ) 1986–1988
- Glass Magic (グラス・マジック) 1988
- Hot Staff '88 (ほっと・すたっふ'88) 1988
- Ōkami wo Meguru Bouken (狼をめぐる冒険) 1989
- Kugatsu no Natsu (9月の夏) 1989
- Yakusoku no Natsu (約束の夏) 1991
- Yousei Jiken 1992 (妖精事件 1992) 1992
- Kurayamizaka (暗闇坂) 1999

=== Collaborations ===
- Wakakusa Monogatari (若草物語) (original creator: Louisa May Alcott) 1985 ISBN 978-4-05-101519-0
- Choushinka Enasu (超新化エナス) (original creator: Toshiki Hirano) 1988–1989
- Carol - K (CAROL-K) (original creator: Naoto Kine) 1995–1998
- Clock Tower Ghost Head (クロックタワーゴーストヘッド) (original creator: Human Entertainment) 1998
- Majuu no Kuru Yoru (魔獣の来る夜) (Kaoru Kurimoto) 2001 ISBN 978-4-87282-802-3
- Houkago, Nanajikan-me. (放課後、七時間目。) (original creator: Nisio Isin) 2006
- Mobile Suit Gundam 00 in those days (機動戦士ガンダム00 in those days) (original creator: Sunrise) 2008–2010 ISBN 978-4-04-715500-8
- Neon Genesis Evangelion Comics Tribute (新世紀エヴァンゲリオン コミックトリビュート) (original creator: Gainax, khara inc.) 2010
- Mobile Suit Gundam 00 Paradise TV (機動戦士ガンダム00 楽園TV) (original creator: Sunrise) 2010
- Itsuka Dokoka no Matikado de (いつかどこかの街角で) (original creator: Sunrise) 2010

=== Artbook collections ===
- LOVE SONGS (1988) ISBN 978-4-403-61165-0
- SSSSPECIAL (1989) ISBN 978-4-403-61194-0
- YOUR EYES ONLY (2005) ISBN 978-4-7580-3005-2
- Mobile Suit Gundam 00 Kouga Yun Design Works (2009) ISBN 978-4-7580-1128-0
- Mobile Suit Gundam 00 Kouga Yun Dear Meisters COMIC&ARTS (2009) ISBN 978-4-04-854356-9
- Mobile Suit Gundam 00 Kouga Yun Works Complete (2010) ISBN 978-4-7580-1206-5

=== Other works ===
- Cycland (CYCLAND サイクランド) 1991 ISBN 978-4-89369-122-4
- Imadoki no Vampire: Bloody Bride Setting Collection (いまどきのバンパイア-高河ゆん+大貫健一設定原画集) 1997 ISBN 978-4-8470-2452-8
- LOVELESS MIND MAP (LOVELESS MIND MAP) 2005 ISBN 978-4-7580-5167-5

== Original character designs ==
- Carol (Naoto Kine) - (Magic Bus)
- High School Aura Buster (Mio Wakagi) - OVA (OLM, Inc.)
- Imadoki no Vampire: Bloody Bride - PlayStation video game (Atlus) (dating sim)
- Mobile Suit Gundam 00 - anime television series (Sunrise)
- Mobile Suit Gundam 00 the Movie: Awakening of the Trailblazer - anime film (Sunrise)
- Un-Go - anime television series (Bones)
- Dream Adventure Chronicles: Amusing Dream - Super Nintendo Entertainment System Video Game (Takara) (Action RPG) (Unreleased)

== Illustrations ==
- Makenden (Seika Nagare)
- Mangaka Marina series (Hitomi Fujimoto)
- High School Aura Buster (Mio Wakagi)
- Light Gene no Isan (Chōhei Kambayashi)
- Moerurubu Tokyo Annai 2006
