= Tsutomu Kashiwakura =

Japanese voice actor and sound director (born 1966)

- カシワクラ ツトム
- Born: March 1, 1966 (age 60); Sagamihara, Kanagawa, Japan
- Occupations: Voice actor; sound director
- Years active: 1985–present
- Agent: Magus

Tsutomu Kashiwakura (カシワクラ ツトム, Kashiwakura Tsutomu; born March 1, 1966 in Sagamihara, Kanagawa) is a Japanese voice actor and sound director. He was formerly credited as 柏倉 つとむ (Kashiwakura Tsutomu).

== Voice roles ==
- Candidate for Goddess: Ernest Cuore
- Captain Tsubasa J: Hikaru Matsuyama
- Chibi Maruko-chan: Hamaji (Noritaka Hamazaki)
- Dark Cat: Ryui Kagezaki
- Digital Devil Story: Megami Tensei: Student
- Fatal Fury: Legend of the Hungry Wolf: Young Terry Bogard
- Generator Gawl: Ryo
- Gestalt: Shoushi
- Goldfish Warning!: Asaba (as a replacement Masaya Onosaka)
- JoJo's Bizarre Adventure: Eyes of Heaven: Sheer Heart Attack
- Little Women II: Jo's Boys: Jack Ford
- Rockman Zero 2/ Remastered Tracks Rockman Zero 3 -TELOS-: Elpis/TK31
- Mobile Suit Zeta Gundam: Navigator (ep. 44)
- Mobile Suit Gundam ZZ: Glemy Toto
- Moero! Top Striker: Roberto Concini
- Nurse Angel Ririka SOS: Nishitokorozawa
- Outlaw Star: Harry MacDougall
- Remi, Nobody's Girl: Emile
- Romeo's Blue Skies: Anzelmo Rossi
- Sailor Moon: Kijin Shinokawa
- Sailor Moon R: Blue Saphir
- Samurai Pizza Cats: Mietoru, Ninja Crows, Gyaman #0
- Shaman King: Conchi
- Super Robot Wars series
  - Super Robot Wars Alpha: Glemy Toto
  - Super Robot Wars Alpha 2: Kousuke Entouji, Pinchernone
  - Super Robot Wars Alpha 3: Tomoro 0117
  - Super Robot Wars A Portable: Zeon Soldier, Glemy Toto, Dan Krüger
  - Super Robot Wars X: Glemy Toto
- The King of Braves GaoGaiGar: Kousuke Entouji, Pinchernone, Takayasu Sunou
- The King of Braves GaoGaiGar Final: Kousuke Entouji, Tomoro 0117, Takayasu Sunou
- They Were Eleven: Chako Kacka
- Tonde Burin: Mushanokoji Takuma
- Urotsukidoji: Kuroko, Idaten
- Yu-Gi-Oh!: Ryo Bakura

=== Drama CDs ===
- My Sexual Harassment series 2: Yume Kamoshirenai (xxxx) (Junya Mochizuki)
- My Sexual Harassment series 3 (xxxx) (Junya Mochizuki)
- Osananajimi (xxxx) (Makoto Matsuki)
- Que Sera, Sera (xxxx) (Masaki Nikaidou)
