= Kazuma Kodaka =

Japanese manga artist

Kazuma Kodaka (こだか和麻, Kodaka Kazuma; born 19 November, 1969 in Kobe) is a Japanese manga artist. Kodaka made her debut in 1989 in the magazine Weekly Shōnen Champion with Sessa Takuma!. She mainly writes manga in the Boys Love genre, featuring homosexual relationships between men for women, and has been described as "a pioneer and top-ranked artist" in the genre. She decided to enter the Boys Love genre as a result of reading parody manga with yaoi themes, finding them "more interesting" than regular shōjo manga and more psychologically complex than shōnen manga. She has also written many dojinshi which are famous, but difficult to obtain, from the series Prince of Tennis, Fullmetal Alchemist, Hikaru no Go, Gankutsuou: The Count of Monte Cristo and Slam Dunk. She designed the characters for the My Sexual Harassment OVA. She taught herself how to draw, but one of her design influences is Rumiko Takahashi. She draws by hand, not using computers, and learned shōjo manga techniques from Sanami Matoh, author of Fake.

== Works ==
- Ikumen After
- Border
- Ren'ai Hōteishiki
- Kizuna: Bonds of Love
- Hana to Ryū
- Sessa Takuma!
- Kimera
- Kusatta Kyōshi no Hōteishiki
- Sebiro no Housekeeper
- My Sexual Harassment
- Sex Therapist
- Mezase Hero!
- Not Ready?! Sensei
- Midare Somenishi
- Ihōjin Etranger
- Chocomint
