= By the Sword (manga) =

Japanese manga series

- By The Sword
- The first volume of By the Sword as released by ADV Manga.

妖 -you- (Yō)
- Genre: Fantasy, Adventure
- Manga
- Written by: Sanami Matoh
- Published by: Akita Shoten (volume 1); Biblos (2003-2005)
- English publisher: NA: ADV Manga
- Original run: 2000 – 2005
- Volumes: 3

By the Sword, known in Japan as You (Japanese: 妖 -you-, Hepburn: Yō), is a Japanese manga series created by Sanami Matoh, who is also the creator of Fake.

== Plot ==
Asagi was born with a mysterious power that gives him the ability to slay demons, by channeling it through a sword. As this generally breaks every sword he uses, Asagi begins searching for a legendary sword known as the "Moegi". Along the way he meet a young girl named Kaede and the spirit of her father Kurenai, who join him on their journey. After he obtains Moegi, the group switches its focus to searching for Kurenai's body, which Asagi can rejoin him to using Moegi. They are also joined by Suoh, a famous spear wielder, his companion Rinrin, a woman of wolf origins named Aoi.

== Manga ==
The By the Sword first tankōbon (bound volume) was originally published by Akita Shoten on August 24, 2000. Later, it was republished by Biblos that released the first volume along the second volume on October 10, 2003. The third and final volume was published on October 5, 2005, by Biblos. The English version of By the Sword was released by ADV Manga on March 7, 2005. In the localisation process some nudity scenes have been removed. For example, ADV Manga edited-out nipples.

== Reception ==
Jarred Pine from Mania.com qualified the story as "extremely average", and said it "just feels uninspired." He criticized the several demon battles that "don't progress the storyline", saying it "isn't going anywhere", and the "stale" humor. Despite Pine praised the costume designs and action scenes he stated it "doesn't offer anything new" for the genre. Animefringe's Janet Crocker commented By the Sword has "a lot of family drama". Crocker called the story "engaging", and noted "it's two steps away from turning into a Jerry Springer episode."
