= Sanami Matoh =

Japanese manga artist

Sanami Matoh 真東 砂波
- Born: April 29, 1969 (age 57) Ōita
- Area: Manga artist
- Notable works: Fake

Sanami Matoh (真東 砂波, Matō Sanami) is a Japanese manga artist born in 1969. She debuted in 1990 with Next to an Angel published by Akita Shoten. Her other works include Fake, By the Sword, and Black x Blood. She taught Kazuma Kodaka, the author of Kizuna: Bonds of Love, shoujo manga drawing techniques.

== Works ==
Title	Year	Notes	Refs
Penguin no Ousama (ペンギンの王様, Penguin King)	1992	Published by Bonita Comics, 3 vols.	
Be-ing	1994	Published by Bonita Comics, 3 vols.	
Fake	1994	Published by Be-boy comics, Hug Paperback, 7 vols.	
Black × Blood	1995	Published by Animage chara comics, 1 vol.	
Ra-i (ライ)	1995	Published by Zero comics, 1 vol.	
Sakura full night	1995	Published by Animage Comics, 1 vol.	
TenRyu: The Dragon Cycle (天龍, TenRyu)	1999	Published by Bonita comics deluxe, 6 vols.	
Until the Full Moon	1998	Published by Be-Boy comics, KCDX / Michao KC, 2 vols.	
By the Sword	2000	Published by Zero comics, 3 vols.	
Color Sanami Matoh illustration collection	2001	1 vol.	
ACCESS-B	2001	Published by Bonita Comics Deluxe, 1 vol.	
Trash	2004	Published by Be-boy comics, 1 vol.	
GURI + GURA	2014	Published by Bee Boy Comics Deluxe, 2 vols.	
