= My Sexual Harassment =

Japanese novel and anime

僕のセクシャルハラスメント (Boku no Sekusharu Harasumento)
- Genre: Drama, erotica, yaoi
- Novel
- Written by: Sakura Momo
- Illustrated by: Kazuma Kodaka
- Published by: Byblos
- Original video animation
- Directed by: Yousei Morino
- Produced by: Hiroshi Iwakura (1); Ken Mochizuki (2–3); Kenji Toyota (3); Shouji Kumabe (3)
- Written by: Morimaru Ran
- Music by: Bang Heads
- Studio: Triple X (Note: Studio Kuma credited with production assistance (制作協力) in every episode.)
- Released: 1994 – 1995
- Runtime: 35–37 minutes
- Episodes: 3

My Sexual Harassment (僕のセクシャルハラスメント, Boku no Sekusharu Harasumento) is a novel and anime by Sakura Momo, with character designs by Kazuma Kodaka.

== Plot ==
Boku No Sexual Harassment consists of three OVAs that revolve around the protagonist Junya Mochizuki performing sexual favors in order to help his mentor and lover Kazunori Honma, as well as himself, climb up the company ladder of the computer firm they work for, which is presumably located in Tokyo, Japan. Mochizuki easily attracts the attention of both men and women in his company, the first of which is his boss, Mr. Honma, whom Mochizuki has an affair with throughout the three OVAs.

The OVAs have been distributed in Spain, in Italy and in Germany.

=== OVA 1 ===
The story begins with Junya Mochizuki going on a train to meet several clients in Niigata with his boss, Kazunori Honma, to discuss a product of theirs. While Junya is working in his cubicle during what appears to be nighttime, he gets interrupted by Honma. Honma begins to fondle him and although Junya insists that he is not a homosexual, Honma continues nonetheless. The two are then seen in a hotel room, where Junya is taking a shower. After exiting the shower, Junya finds that Honma is in his room. Not having realized that his room is a suite where he and Mr. Honma's rooms are connected, he is taken aback at first. Honma quickly undresses and the two begin to have sex on the bed in the hotel room.

The two make it to Niigata and one of the clients at their meeting, the vice president of another company, appears to show attraction towards Junya. Junya and Honma are treated to dinner by the client. They then return to Tokyo.

The next day, while Junya is standing in an elevator, he runs into an employee named Hiromi Miyagawa, who thanks him for fixing a mistake in a product before it went into development. As another employee, Fujita, gets on, Hiromi runs off. Fujita asks Junya if he would be interested in attending the company's outing that is happening the following week, and Junya says he will. Hiromi is then seen talking with two other women, presumably also employees, about Junya. The two other women suspect that Junya and Fujita are going out with one another, due to Fujita's request to play tennis with Junya alone during the company outing. Hiromi does not want to believe it, and claims that Junya is straight, to which one of the women replies that it does not matter whether or not Junya is straight, since as long as the love is pure, it will happen.

Afterwards, Fujita and Junya go out drinking together. While being driven back in a taxi, Junya begins to fall asleep and confesses his attraction towards Mr. Honma. The next morning, Hiromi and Junya are talking when Fujita tells Junya that Mr. Honma is looking for him. Honma informs him that he will most likely be unable to attend the outing, due to the client from the meeting coming to Tokyo the following day to discuss the product that was being discussed during the meeting. Junya and Honma go into the conference room to discuss the situation, where Honma reveals that the only reason the vice president is visiting is because he wants to have sex with Junya. It is also revealed that if Junya agrees to having sex with the vice president, the VP's company will buy more of Junya's company's computers. Junya agrees, and Honma begins to have sex with Junya in the conference room.

When Saturday arrives, Junya is seen naked with the vice president on top of him. They begin to have sex when Junya yells Mr. Honma's name. Junya is then seen preparing tea for Fujita, when Fujita mentions that Junya and Honma were with each other before Fujita arrived. Fujita then reveals that he knows about Junya's attraction to Honma due to his confession of it in the taxi. Fujita also confesses that he is attracted to Junya as well, and as they are getting close, the phone rings. Junya answers and is greeted by Mr. Honma, who asks if he can meet with Jonya the following day at 1 o'clock. Fujita leaves as they are talking and Honma reveals that he could tell that Fujita was attracted to Junya.

=== OVA 2 ===
The second OVA begins with a young Junya throwing a jar into water. This is followed by a present Junya waking up in his bed, and explaining that he has been working at the company for four years and has become the manager of his company since the last OVA. Honma has also become the head of development for the company.

The next scene shows Junya and Mr. Honma meeting in a teahouse, when Mr. Honma reveals to Junya that an outside source caught him and the vice president from their meeting in Niigata walk into a hotel together, and informed the vice president, Mr. Masataka Sawagura of their company about it. However, the said outside source sided with Junya and told Sawagura, the vice president of their company, to keep quiet about it. However, Honma then informs Junya that Mr. Sawagura also knows about Honma and Junya being involved with one another. He then informs Junya that Mr. Sawagura is interested in him and that he wants to have sex with him, but is into BDSM. Junya accepts, as he is aware that it will get him higher on the corporate ladder. It is also implied that Honma has slept with Mr. Sawagura, as when he is asked as to why he knows what Mr. Sawagura is into, he simply responds by asking "How do you think?"

It is also discovered that Junya and Sawagura attended the same university and that Sawagura is the soon-to-be president of the company, due to the current president leaving soon.

Junya is then seen in Mr. Sawagura's bedroom with his hands tied behind his back on the bed, where Sawagura is inserting a vibrating sex toy of some sort inside of Junya's rectum. "Room service" arrives, but it turns out to be Honma, carrying a bottle of wine. He unties Junya, and is then told by Sawagura that he is "spoiling" Junya. Therefore, Honma begins to make out with Junya and fondle him, which causes Sawagura to begin giving Junya oral sex.

== Characters ==
Junya Mochizuki (望月 純也, Mochizuki Jun'ya)
Voiced by: Tsutomu Kashiwakura
Mochizuki is a young business man who wants to climb higher up the business ladder. He has soft, handsome looks so he attracts both women and men. In order to become a better business man he sleeps with men, but that's intentionally done because they would do a good job for the company he works for.

Kazunori Honma (本間 一徳, Honma Kazunori)
Voiced by: Juurouta Kosugi
Mr. Honma is the boss of the company Mochizuki works for. His company specializes in computers and because of the greatness of Mr. Honma they get a lot of money. He is admired by both women and men because of his intelligence and good looks. He is attracted to Mochizuki and gives him special service aka sex.

Yohei Fujita (藤田 洋平, Fujita Yohei)
Voiced by: Toshiyuki Morikawa
Fujita is the young employee of the same computer company Junya works for. When Fujita got his post at the company, he took a romantic and sexual interest in Junya. As the two of them are friends, they often play tennis together. Apart from tennis, Fujita also plays rugby.

Hiromi Miyagawa (宮川 ひろみ, Miyagawa Hiromi)
Voiced by: Yousuke Akimoto

Young boy
Voiced by: Akira Ishida

Young man
Voiced by: Takehito Koyasu

Mr. Sawagura (澤のグラ-サン, Sawagura-san)
Voiced by: Minoru Inaba

Yumi Mayakawa (宮川 ゆうみ, Mayakawa Yumi)
Voiced by: Atsuko Tanaka
Yumi is a co-worker of Junya

Emily (エミリー, Emirī)
Voiced by: Kikuko Inoue
Emily is Mr. Honda's secretary.

John (ジョン)
Voiced by: Kenyuu Horiuchi

William Rogers (ウィリアム・ロジャース, Uiriamu Rojāsu)
Voiced by: Koji Mori

== Other voices ==
- Miho Yoshida
- Makoto Tsumura
- Kaoru Shimamura
- Takehito Koyasu
- Akira Ishida
