= Copybook (comics) =

Japanese comic

A dōjinshi copybook or copybon (コピー本) is a self-published and self-made work by fans or original fiction published using a copy machine.

== Types ==
Copybooks are usually fan fiction featuring characters that are not the artist's own, but they can often feature original characters and situations. H-copybooks are erotic. (The letter 'H' usually stands for erotic content in Japan.) Most copybooks are erotic hentai, or Japanese drawn erotic comics. Some copybooks are hand-drawn; these are rare. Most books consist of hand-drawn comics with very little screen tones.

== Printing and binding ==
Copybooks are self-printed by the dōjinshi-ka (dōjinshi artists) and self-bound. The most common type are printed on copy paper using a photocopier. They are usually bound together with staples down the front or in the middle. Some are bound with glue and tape.

== Reception and value ==
Because copybooks are printed in such few number (usually 10 to 20), their value increases over time. Rare copybooks by well-known dōjinshi circles are coveted collector's items and bring in an impressive revenue. Many dōjinshi artists and circles begin and build reputations with copybooks.

Japan produces most copybook dōjinshi, which can be found at Comiket or any other dōjinshi convention. American copybooks are extremely rare due to strict American copyright laws, and few books are in circulation. These are high in value. Famous copybook circles include Fresh Fruits and Momonga Club.

== See also ==
- Zine
