= Until the Full Moon =

Japanese manga series

- Cover of Until the Full Moon Vol. 1

FULL MOONにささやいて (Full Moon ni Sasayaite)
- Genre: Shōnen-ai
- Manga
- Written by: Sanami Matoh
- Published by: Biblos
- English publisher: NA: Kodansha USA
- Magazine: Magazine Be × Boy
- Original run: June 10, 1998 – unknown
- Volumes: 2
- Manga

@Full Moon
- Illustrated by: Sanami Matoh
- English publisher: NA: Kodansha USA
- Original run: 2008 – unknown
- Volumes: 2

Until the Full Moon (FULL MOONにささやいて, Full Moon ni Sasayaite) is a Japanese manga series written and illustrated by Sanami Matoh.

== Plot ==
Marlo, a teenage half-vampire, half-werewolf, discovers that during the full moon, he turns into a girl. His family betroth him to the playboy vampire and son of a family friend, David.

=== Sequel ===
In 2008, a sequel to the 1998 series was released that focused on the married life of Marlo and David.

== Publication history ==
Originally serialized in Be Boy Comics, the individual chapters were collected and published in a single tankōbon volume by Biblos in 1998. In February 2005, Until the Full Moon was translated to English and published in North America by Broccoli Books. The license for the company eventually lapsed and the manga license was picked up by Kodansha USA for a 2011 release of both volumes as well as the sequel.
