= Crown of Love (manga) =

Japanese manga series

- North American cover of the first manga volume

恋愛-CROWN- (Renai Crown)
- Genre: Romance
- Manga
- Written by: Yun Kōga
- Published by: Shueisha
- English publisher: VIZ Media
- Magazine: Comic Crimson
- English magazine: Shojo Beat
- Original run: 1998 – 2002
- Volumes: 4

Crown of Love (恋愛-CROWN-) is a Japanese josei manga written and illustrated by Yun Kōga and serialized in Shueisha's Comic Crimson magazine. The manga tells a story of Hisayoshi, son of opera singer, who meets idol Rima and instantly falls in love with her to the point of obsession.

In January 2010 Viz Media has announced the acquisition of Crown of Love license. The first English volume was released on February 2, 2010.

== Plot ==
After a chance encounter, Hisayoshi "Kumi" Tajima falls madly in love with teen idol Rima Fujio. Bewitched by her beauty, he only wants to get closer to her. As a fan, he lives in a separate world. But if he becomes a fellow idol, maybe things will be different. Thus inspired, he strives to achieve his goal.

== Media ==
=== Volume list ===
No.	Original release date	Original ISBN	North American release date	North American ISBN
01	December 17, 1998	978-4-4201-7001-7	February 2, 2010	978-1-4215-3193-9
02	September 24, 1999	978-4-4201-7012-3	May 4, 2010	978-1-4215-3194-6
03	November 24, 2000	978-4-4201-7023-9	August 3, 2010	978-1-4215-3195-3
04	April 25, 2002	978-4-4201-7039-0	November 11, 2010	978-1-4215-3196-0
