= Earthian =

Manga

- The cover of volume 1 of the Earthian manga (English edition).

アーシアン (Āshian)
- Genre: Yaoi, science fiction
- Manga
- Written by: Yun Kōga
- Published by: Shinshokan
- English publisher: NA: BLU
- Magazine: Wings
- Original run: 1988 – 1994
- Volumes: 4
- Original video animation
- Directed by: Kenichi Ohnuki; Nobuyasu Furukawa; Toshiyasu Kogawa
- Studio: J.C.Staff
- Licensed by: NA: Media Blasters
- Released: 26 July 1989 – 21 December 1996
- Runtime: 45 minutes (each)
- Episodes: 4

Earthian (アーシアン, Āshian) is a yaoi manga by Yun Kōga. It is about angel watchers of earth which was made into a J.C.Staff-produced anime OVA. The angels' roles are to assess the progress of humans giving them positive and negative scores based on their everyday actions. The angels, who have deemed that the Earthian are becoming far too destructive, decide that if the Earthian reach 10,000 negative marks instead of positive, then their world will be destroyed. While there are many sets of positive/negative partner teams that have descended on Earth to carry out their investigations, the story focuses on a single pair that, due to the carelessness (or perhaps over-caring nature) of one, causes both to end up in trying circumstances multiple times throughout their stay on planet Earth.

There are four OVAs total, three of which continue the same plot, and another that delves into a separate side story. All of them coincide with the original manga.

== Story ==
For thousands of years angels have observed the behavior of humans from their homeland Eden. They are disgusted with humans for how they treat their planet and how they treat each other. It is decided that the humans should be wiped out. However, to give the humans a chance, Eden sends down many pairs of angels to observe the humans. One is a plus checker, who seeks the good in humans; the other is a minus checker, who seeks the bad in humans. If more good is seen in humans, they will be spared. But if 10,000 minus checks are made against them, then they will be destroyed.

Along with humans, angels fear and despise Lucifers, also known as fallen angels. An angel is typically born with light hair and white wings, but if an angel acts against Eden too many times, then their hair and wings will turn black, known as the Black Cancer, and they die. To encourage that angels stay away from both humans and Lucifers, it's decreed that if an angel exposes their wings to three humans or if they meet too many Lucifers, they shall also become one as well.

Chihaya is an orphaned angel of Eden. He was born with black hair and black wings, resembling a Lucifer. Because of this, he was shunned for most of his life, finding acceptance only in the residents at the orphanage and his adopted father Michael. He becomes a plus checker to see Earth and because of his love for humanity. Over time, he continuously interacts with Lucifers and feels a kinship towards them because of their hair and wings.

He is paired with Kagetsuya, a handsome and popular white-winged angel who hates mankind and holds hostility for Lucifers. Due to this prejudice, Kagetsuya is extremely hostile towards Chihaya at first, constantly belittling him because of his feelings and appearance. Despite all this, Kagetsuya often finds himself carried away with Chihaya's ideals and constantly aiding him, though it's against his position.

Things grow even more complicated for the pair when they fall in love with each other. Homosexuality is forbidden in Eden, but that doesn't stop their feelings for one another. Along the way, many secrets are discovered within Eden itself and the angels and the pair, especially Kagetsuya, must decide which side they will choose.

== Characters ==
=== Main characters ===
Chihaya in his human form

Chihaya (ちはや)

A beautiful male angel with short black hair. When he transforms he has long black hair and black wings. In Eden, where angels are generally fair-haired with white wings, Chihaya's naturally dark features make him an outcast. Despite his mutation, he is light-hearted and happy, and he cares deeply for the Earthian, unlike most other angels. This rare quality allows him to see beyond the Earthians' violence and destruction to the core of their hearts, which he believes are pure and kind, despite any other shortcomings. He is a positive checker, though he tends to let his emotions get in the way of his work. His special power is the ability to generate storms. Chihaya is the lover of Kagetsuya.

Kagetsuya in the human form

Kagetsuya (影艶)

Chihaya's partner, a negative checker. He is a typical looking angel, with blond hair and white wings, and is from a wealthy family. Like most other angels, he also bears a strong resentment towards the Earthians, who he believes are irresponsible and selfish. He is more mature and focused than Chihaya, and often ends up having to go to the aid of his partner. His specialty lies in bird calling and the healing arts. Kagetsuya is the lover of Chihaya.

=== Episodes 1, 3 & 4 ===
Dr. Ashino (Professor Ashiya)

The mad doctor who created the biohumanoids, Taki and Takako. He seems to love Taki more than anything else in the world, and his madness reaches its peak when his beloved creation defies him. Later, inspired by Chihaya, Ashino creates a third android, this one a black angel and naming him Messiah, of whom he plans to use to destroy humanity.

Taki (多紀)

An android made specially by Doctor Ashino to possess inhuman strength and endurance. Fed up with his life as a captive toy, Taki takes Takako and flees the laboratory, much to the dismay of his creator. He cares for Ashino, but he also does not want to be treated like a lifeless thing with no feelings.

Takako

A gynoid. Like Taki, she is artificial. When the two of them get separated, she runs into Chihaya, who helps her flee from guards sent by Dr. Ashino to take her back to the lab. She is very concerned about Taki's well-being, for she does not know what had become of him after their escape, but apparently, Chihaya has some idea as to where he is.

K-001

A ruthless killer android created by Dr. Ashino who almost kills Taki as Takako escapes from her captors. He was later sent to bring her back to them and ends up kidnapping Chihaya to lure her back.

Elvira

An angel who was looking after two young angel children who were kidnapped by Dr. Ashino. She aids the children in their escape where Chihaya and Kagetsuya went to Dr. Ashino's home and lab to save them.

Messiah

The black-winged angelic android created for one purpose only: to destroy the Earth and all the miserable people who went about their lives in spite of Dr. Ashino's suffering. Incidentally, before his memory chip can be properly finished, he makes contact with Chihaya, who shows him his identical black wings. Messiah becomes confused, but decides that what he truly wants is to protect Chihaya, at all costs.

=== Episode 2 ===
Aya (あや)

A female minus checker from Eden who openly flaunts her love for Kagetsuya and her scorn for the Earthian. She constantly makes it known to everyone that she would rather be Kagetsuya's partner, but not so much that she would convert to a plus checker. She gets worked up easily and is deeply envious of Chihaya.

Miyagi (宮城)

A male angel that slightly resembles Kagetsuya. Unlike the latter, though, he is a positive checker for the Earthian and believes that they should be given a chance. He is Aya's partner. His temperament is somewhat more relaxed than hers, and so he tries to keep her in check whenever possible.

Lord Seraphim (セラフィム, Seraphim)

A former leader of the plus-checkers of Eden that contracted the Black Cancer. He later descended to Earth where Chihaya and Kagetsuya found him before he died. He was very close to Chihaya and the black-angel took the loss very badly.

Cliff Gray

Another angel, originally called Sapphire who contracted the Black Cancer who was living in England with the woman he loved, Blair. Chihaya sought him out when he was battling with his doubts about his own wing and hair color.

Blair

The Earthian that Sapphire fell in love with.

Hyman

A corrupt music producer who wanted a hit song by Cliff Gray at any cost. After his only record was destroyed, he kidnaps him and Blair and forces him to record a song, but after a struggle Kagetsuya manages to retrieve the tape from him.

== OVA Cast ==
Earthian cast
Role		Japanese	English
Narrator			Phil Kouwe
Chihaya		Nozomu Sasaki	Robert Gompers
Kagetsuya		Kazuhiko Inoue	Ed Wagenseller
Dr. Ashino		Kaneto Shiozawa	Robin Robertson
Messiah		Hikaru Midorikawa	Michael Granberry
1	Takako	Yuriko Yamamoto	Juliet Cesario
1	Taki		Dave Snow
1	K-001		Pierre Brulatour
1	Doctor		Justin Smith
1	Politician		Michael S. Way
1	Head of Office		Bob Edwards
1	Hoshino		Michael Dubois
1	Man (1)	Michitaka Kobayashi	
1	Young Man	Masaaki Ookura	
2	Cliff Gray	Shigeru Nakahara	J.R. Rodriguez
2	Blair	Rei Sakuma	Courtney Wright
2	Miyagi	Hirotaka Suzuoki	David Lechter
2	Aya	Saeko Shimazu	Pamela Weidner-Houle
2	Seraphim	Shou Hayami	Patrick Troy
2	Hyman	Masahi Hirose	Michael Titterton
2	Maid	Ai Satou	Sara Seidman-Vance
2	Louie		Geoffrey Lancaster
2	Club Manager	Jun'ichi Sugawara	Brook Merritt
2	Man (2)	Toshiya Mori	Rick Forrester
2	Man (3)	Mitsuru Ogata	William Flaman
3	Elvira	Emi Ogata	Traci Dinwiddie
3	Black Angel 1	Tomoko Ishimura	Izzy Burger-Welsh
3	Black Angel 2	Akira Ishida	Kara Houck
3	Soldier 1	Daiki Nakamura	Larry Tobias
3	Soldier 2	Kouji Ishii	Edgar Booth
3	Captain	Kiyoyuki Yanada	Michael S. Way
3	Helmsman	Eiji Sekiguchi	David Lee
3	Computer	Kunihiko Yasui	Lanelle Markgraf
3	Newscaster (1)	Yuusei Oda	Phil Kouwe
3	Agent (1)		Dave Underwood
3	Agent (2)		Boise Holmes
3	Guard (1)	Yasunori Masutani	Robert Schaff
3	Guard (2)		Sam Clements
3	Guard (3)		Clay Richardson
4	Gang Member	Hidetoshi Nakamura	Stu Miller
4	Bonnie	Yuriko Yamaguchi	Catherine Messing
4	Punk	Isshin Chiba	Michael Sinterniklaas
4	Assistant	Kouichi Sakaguchi	Gary Harding
4	Newscaster (2)	Eiji Sekiguchi	Rick Sisk
4	Woman on Phone	Yumiko Nakanishi	Pamela Weidner-Houle
4	Operator		Andre Walker
4	Bossman		Jeff Johnston
4	Machine		Jeff Yeager

=== Additional voices ===
English: Chris Nubel, Falcon Summers, J.R. Rodriguez, Rick Forrester, Sean P. O'Connell, Shane Callahan, and William Flaman.

== Plot ==
=== The Beginning of the End (OVA 1) ===
Two angels; Chihaya and Kagetsuya are sent from Eden by Archangel Michael to Earth to further study Earthian behaviour. Despite an incident in Hong Kong where Chihaya exposed his wings to someone, both he and his partner are given a new assignment to study human activity in Shinjuku. There Chihaya befriends a young woman who is more than what she seemed.

The woman who is named Takako is actually a gynoid, created for the purpose of further study by Dr. Ashino, so that he can try and ascend humanity to the level to God. Takako escaped from a facility called The House where they were about to implant a fail safe system into her which would reduce her experience to human emotions and therefore not bring her blood to a boiling point, where her heart could self-destruct and take out a large area of the city and killing many people. After a run in with Dr. Ashino's other android creation; K-001, both Chihaya and Kagetsuya exposed their wings to the gynoid, before finding help from a doctor who it turns out was helping to hide an android from Dr. Ashino; who helped Takako to escape. That android was Taki, the one who Chihaya exposed his wings to back in Hong Kong.

K-001 soon arrives at the doctor's clinic and kidnaps Chihaya and says that he would only be released if Takako gives herself up. Soon both she and Kagetsuya go to The House to rescue Chihaya, of whom Dr. Ashino has taken an interest in that would help him to set the stage for events that take place in the later OVA's.

=== Fallen Angel (OVA 2) ===
Of the four OVAs in the series, Fallen Angel is the only one that does not relate to the events of the first.

Chihaya and Kagetsuya are staying in France for their current assignment, and lately Chihaya has been having some disturbing nightmares. As Kagetsuya tries to console his partner over breakfast, Aya and Miyagi show up on vacation, and decide to stay in France for a short while.

Chihaya and Kagetsuya's mission is to locate the exiled angel named Sapphire, who has been hiding on Earth ever since his wings became black with cancer. Chihaya discovers Sapphire's whereabouts, and, learning about the former High Angel's predicament with some shady dealings, he lets himself become involved, much to the dismay of Kagetsuya, who knows that every time something bad goes down with the Earthian, it is always Chihaya who suffers.

The partners struggle to help Sapphire while keeping everything a secret from their guests, but Chihaya's exceedingly strange behavior has not been lost on Aya, and she begins to make some deductions of her own. Both she and Miyagi are well aware of the fact that Sapphire's disappearance has not been taken lightly back in Eden, and as it is, any fallen angels are considered to be a huge disgrace.

In the midst of all this, Chihaya is also hiding a secret of his own; one that has to do with the frightening dreams he has been having. His fears are eating away at his heart, and he worries that what happened to Sapphire might be the same thing that caused the abnormal color in his wings and hair.

=== Angelic Destroyer (OVA 3) ===
Picking up where the 1st OVA left off, Chihaya and Kagetsuya are trying to infiltrate Dr. Ashino's lab in order to rescue two black angel children who are being held for interrogation by the mad doctor. The pair split up to search for the hostages, and while wandering through the corridors, Chihaya discovers, locked away in a side room, a black-winged angel like himself, attached to wires extending from the walls.

The angel's name is Messiah, and Chihaya, desperate to get the dormant figure's attention, exposes his wings at the window of the room. Messiah's memory chip, still in the process of being encrypted, takes in the image of Chihaya's transformation and fills Messiah's mind with strange emotions. He is compelled to approach the angel on the other side of the glass window, but cannot get out of the locked room.

An alarm begins to sound, and Chihaya and Kagetsuya meet up again, Kagetsuya carrying the two children. They are forced to evacuate the lab immediately, as it is about to explode. Elvira, the mother of the children, pulls up in her car and help them get away. Chihaya is deeply troubled that he was unable to save the black-winged angel.

One morning, while watching the news, Chihaya discovers that Doctor Ashino has arrived in the city accompanied by a strange man in a trenchcoat. Chihaya immediately recognizes the man as Messiah. Ashino has been having dealings with the military, and was commissioned into creating the ultimate weapon of destruction: Messiah. However, he is not in it just for the money. Troubled by the fact that Taki abandoned him, Ashino is plotting revenge against the entire world, who stood by despite his suffering.

=== Final Battle (OVA 4) ===
Chihaya is reluctant to accept Messiah's disappearance, and no matter how Kagetsuya tries to comfort him, he can only ever think of the android whose wings were like his. Messiah, in the meanwhile, is making his living carrying out errands for a club of drug dealers. He feels accepted by these people, who are appreciative of his physical strength, but longs to find Chihaya again.

Using his connection to the world's computer database, Messiah searches for his friend. Chihaya, also online, discovers Messiah's call, and rushes to meet him in the sky. However, Ashino has also been tracking Messiah, and he sends in men to capture the runaway android.

Ultimately, Messiah needs to choose between staying with Chihaya and learning more about the emotions that confuse him, or give up his freedom in exchange for the assurance of Chihaya's safety, and become the weapon of destruction he was intended to be.

== Presence of Shōnen-ai (in the OVA) ==
Because the OVA focused only on two stories out of a manga that contained many others, some things were cut from the plot line. As a result, viewers without prior knowledge of the manga may wonder about the events in the OVAs. Earthian is a shōnen-ai title, and of all the OVAs, but the only time this theme is referenced is for a brief time in the third episode. There is no mention of the manga forbidding of homosexuality in Eden, and as such some degree of depth of conflict is missing for characters who show signs of interest in those of the same gender. This was likely done because the depth of detail that would have to be explained would not be possible for an OVA series.

== Reception ==
The fourth OVA was reviewed by Anime News Network, which called Earthian "not that good, plot-wise".

Helen McCarthy in 500 Essential Anime Movies says that manga was "a meditation of mortality, love and the responsibly we have to create our own Eden", while in the OVA Kagetsuya and Chihaya "get the most of the screen time" and the OVA "crams in so much that there's little time to explain or develop even the remaining cast".

== Media ==
=== Manga ===
The first North American release of Earthian was under the Blu publishing branch of Tokyopop. The manga was later acquired and re-released by Digital Manga Publishing beginning in 2012 as a 5 volume release.

=== Volume list ===
No.	Original release date	Original ISBN	North American release date	North American ISBN
01	1 October 2002	978-4-4202-2038-5	30 November 2005	978-1-5981-6006-2
02	1 October 2002	978-4-4202-2039-2	7 February 2006	978-1-5981-6007-9
03	1 December 2002	978-4-4202-2040-8	30 May 2006	978-1-5981-6008-6
04	1 December 2002	978-4-4202-2041-5	15 August 2006	978-1-5981-6009-3
