= Gestalt (manga) =

Fantasy manga and its franchise

- The cover of the first manga volume of the original Enix edition

超獣伝説ゲシュタルト (Chōjū Densetsu Gestalt)
- Genre: Adventure, fantasy
- Manga
- Written by: Yun Kōga
- Published by: Enix (former); Ichijinsha
- English publisher: NA: Viz Media
- Magazine: Fantastic Comic (July 25, 1992); Monthly Gangan Fantasy (April 1993 – February 2001)
- Original run: July 25, 1992 – January 18, 2001
- Volumes: 8
- Original video animation
- Directed by: Osamu Yamazaki
- Produced by: Tomoyuki Igarashi; Yumiko Masushima; Koji Honda; Yoshitaka Noguchi; Kengo Kimura
- Written by: Mariya Fujimura
- Music by: Toshiyuki Omori
- Studio: Tokyo Kids
- Licensed by: US: Media Blasters
- Released: January 22, 1997 – February 21, 1997
- Runtime: 29 minutes (each)
- Episodes: 2
- icon

Gestalt (超獣伝説ゲシュタルト, Chōjū Densetsu Geshutaruto; lit. Super-Legend Gestalt) is an eight-volume fantasy manga series by Yun Kōga and published by Enix and later by Ichijinsha. It was adapted into a two-episode OVA series.

== Plot ==
The story circulates around a mysterious and dangerous island referred to simply as "G". A long time ago, a powerful god named Gestalt was banished to the earth and he had found refuge on the island "G". To utter the name for which the "G" stands is forbidden, as people were so afraid of the wrath of the god that they considered his name a curse. Father Olivier is a priest who has left his order and traveled to the island of "G" in order to discover the truth behind it. He makes the acquaintance of a young girl named Ohri, who turns out to be quite adept in magic.

Meanwhile, the head of Father Olivier's priestly order has hired a dark elf, Suzu, to track down Olivier and bring him back. Suzu finds Olivier easily enough; what she hadn't anticipated was the powerful sorceress in his company, Ohri. Ohri shakes Suzu, and she and Father Olivier continue on. The island of "G" has its share of monsters and magic-users to get in the way of their travels, however, beyond merely Father Olivier's overlings.

== Media ==
=== Manga ===
The manga Gestalt was first serialized in Enix's Monthly Gangan Fantasy, and then Monthly GFantasy (Monthly Gangan Fantasy was renamed Monthly GFantasy upon release of its April 1994 issue), in issues dated between April 1993 and February 2001, although the first chapter was published in Fantastic Comic (a special issue of Monthly Shōnen Gangan which launched Gangan Fantasy) on July 25, 1992. It was collected into eight tankōbon volumes. The series was republished by Ichijinsha under the imprint Zero-Sum Comics in 2005–2006, with new cover art. The Ichijinsha edition was published in English by Viz Media.

=== Volume list ===
==== Enix edition ====
No.	Release date	ISBN
1	January 27, 1994	978-4870255012
2	March 1995	978-4870255371
3	February 1997	978-4870255777
4	September 1997	978-4870255890
5	March 1998	978-4870252851
6	February 1999	978-4870254435
7	June 2000	978-4757502505
8	March 2001	978-4757504400

==== Ichijinsha edition ====
No.	Original release date	Original ISBN	English release date	English ISBN
1	February 25, 2005	978-4-7580-5131-6	June 16, 2009	978-1-4215-2690-4
2	February 25, 2005	978-4-7580-5132-3	August 18, 2009	978-1-4215-2691-1
3	May 25, 2005	978-4-7580-5150-7	October 20, 2009	978-1-4215-2692-8
4	May 25, 2005	978-4-7580-5151-4	December 15, 2009	978-1-4215-2693-5
5	July 25, 2005	978-4-7580-5162-0	February 16, 2010	978-1-4215-2694-2
6	July 25, 2005	978-4-7580-5163-7	April 16, 2010	978-1-4215-2695-9
7	July 25, 2006	978-4-7580-5238-2	June 15, 2010	978-1-4215-2696-6
8	July 25, 2006	978-4-7580-5239-9	August 17, 2010	978-1-4215-2697-3

=== Drama CDs ===
There were 2 drama CDs that were commercially released by Enix. The main cast were Kae Araki as Ouri and Takehito Koyasu as Olivier. The first drama CD was released in September 1994 while the second drama CD was released in April 1996.

=== OVA ===
There was a two-episode Original video animation (OVA) adaptation directed by Osamu Yamasaki with music done by Toshiyuki Ōmori as well as casting assistance by 81 Produce. The first episode was released on January 22 and the second on February 21, 1997. The original video animation (OVA) was licensed in English by Media Blasters. The cast from the drama CDs also lent their voices to the production of the OVA.

=== Novels ===
There was a two-part light novel written by Chizuru Yoshikawa with illustrations by the original author, Yun Kōga, entitled Chōjū Densetsu Gestalt Rakuin no Junkyōsha (超獣伝説ゲシュタルト 烙印の殉教者; Super Legend Gestalt: The Marked Martyr). The novels were published by Enix under the imprint, GFantasy Novels. The first volume was published in March 1999 and the second in August 1999.

== Reception ==
Helen McCarthy in 500 Essential Anime Movies calls "comedy", including jokes and parodies of fantasy role-playing games, "the show's major selling point".
