= Kizuna: Bonds of Love =

Japanese manga series

- Kizuna
- Cover of the sixth volume of the manga Kizuna, published by Digital Manga in 2012

絆 KIZUNA～恋のから騒ぎ～ (Kizuna: Koi no Kara Sawagi)
- Genre: Yaoi
- Manga
- Written by: Kazuma Kodaka
- Published by: Biblos
- English publisher: NA: Digital Manga (current) Be Beautiful (former)
- Magazine: Magazine Be × Boy
- Original run: 1992 – 2008
- Volumes: 11
- Original video animation
- Directed by: Rin Hiroo
- Released: 1994
- Runtime: 30 minutes
- Episodes: 2
- Original video animation

Kizuna: Much Ado About Nothing
- Directed by: Kazuo Yamazaki
- Studio: Zexcs
- Released: March 3, 2001
- Runtime: 45 minutes
- icon

Kizuna: Bonds of Love (Japanese: 絆 KIZUNA～恋のから騒ぎ～, Hepburn: Kizuna: Koi no Kara Sawagi) is a yaoi manga, authored by Kazuma Kodaka. In Japan, a total of eleven volumes were published first by Biblos and then by Libre Publishing between December 1992 and September 2008. In North America, the series was partially released in English by Be Beautiful between September 2004 and August 2007. Digital Manga Publishing later acquired the license and condensed the entire series into six volumes, published from September 2010 to May 2012.

Kizuna has also been adapted into a drama CD in 1998, and into three original video animations (OVAs). The first two are each 30 minutes long and were released in 1994. Both subtitled and dubbed versions of these OVAs have been released in the United States on DVD. The third OVA, titled "Much Ado About Nothing", is 45 minutes long and came out in Japan in 2001.

== Plot ==
Kei Enjouji falls in love with kendo prodigy Ranmaru Samejima when they meet in their first year of middle school. From that moment on, Enjouji becomes determined to romantically pursue Ranmaru, regardless of the coldness and annoyance the other shows him. Throughout their remaining years in school, their relationship grows from awkward friendship to a strong love.

When Enjouji's mother dies during his third year of high school, she leaves him a letter revealing that he is the eldest, albeit illegitimate, son of yakuza boss Takeshi Sagano. Seeing Enjouji's distress over his mother's death, Ranmaru vows to protect him. Ranmaru makes good on his promise that very afternoon, saving Enjouji's life by shoving him out of the way of a yakuza hit man's car. Ranmaru survives the hit-and-run, but he is gravely injured and it looks like he will have to give up kendo. Enjouji supports Ranmaru throughout his extensive physical therapy. With their love for each other strengthened by adversity, the two start living together.

Neither of them want to have dealings with the yakuza, but get drawn into it when Enjouji's younger half-brother, Kai Sagano, Takeshi's legitimate son, comes looking for trouble. Kai says that he loves Ranmaru too and blames Enjouji for everything that has gone wrong with his life. Despite the rocky start, Enjouji and Ranmaru soon befriend Kai. At one point, Kai saves a drugged-up Ranmaru from a lecherous professor. He ends up taking advantage of Ranmaru's vulnerable state and rapes him, but neither Enjouji nor Ranmaru hold a grudge against Kai. While Kai claims to love Ranmaru, he has more than platonic feelings for his bodyguard, Masanori Araki. Masanori has been Kai's caretaker since he was little and has a brother-like relationship with the boy. The situation is further complicated by the fact that Kai is the son of a yakuza boss.

Much Ado About Nothing (絆 KIZUNA~恋のから騒ぎ, Kizuna: Koi no kara Sawagi) Enjouji and Ranmaru are a mostly-happy couple, but when Ranmaru finds lipstick on Enjouji's chest, he becomes suspicious and leaves in a huff. Enjouji follows Ranmaru throughout the day. As they do so, the two men think about their past and their uncertain future.

== Main characters ==
Kei Enjouji (燕条寺 圭, Enjouji Kei)
Voiced by: Keiji Fujiwara (OVAs 1 and 2) (Japanese), Kazuya Ichijō (OVA 3 and Drama CD) (Japanese); Dan Green (English)
The illegitimate son of a yakuza boss from Osaka and of a former geisha who did not want her son to be involved with the yakuza, Enjouji grows up in Tokyo knowing nothing about his father. He falls in love with Ranmaru in middle school. Their relationship evolves rapidly after Enjouji's mother dies. Ranmaru vows to take care of Enjouji and almost ends up crippled after saving him from an attempted hit. The tables now turned, Enjouji takes care of Ranmaru all throughout his recovery. Enjouji is not at all shy about his feelings for Ranmaru and even gives him a wedding ring to marry him. He does his best to remain uninvolved with the yakuza. For a long time, he cannot stand his younger half-brother, Kai, seeing him not only as a spoiled brat, but as an extension of the yakuza life. Nevertheless, he comes to care about his little brother in his own way.
Ranmaru Samejima (鮫島 蘭丸, Samejima Ranmaru)
Voiced by: Ryōtarō Okiayu (Japanese); Jamie McGonnigal (English)
Although he is a prodigy at kendo, Ranmaru does not have any friends until he meets Enjouji in middle school. He is initially taken aback by Enjouji's's straight-forwardness, but also impressed with his rusty kendo skills. The two end up confessing their feelings for one another in high school and take their relationship to the physical level. When Enjouji feels distressed over his mother's death, Ranmaru vows to always protect him. He keeps his promise by pushing Enjouji out of the way of a yakuza hit man. The assault leaves Ranmaru paralyzed on his right side and believing he can never do kendo again. After undergoing extensive physical therapy with Enjouji at his side, however, the outlook is promising. Ranmaru is very shy about his feelings, but there is no denying he loves Enjouji. Like him, Ranmaru wants no part of the yakuza life that nearly killed him. Although he takes kindly to Kai, he tries to draw the line when it comes to the younger man's affections. He wants Enjouji and Kai to put their animosity aside and have a brotherly relationship. From his childhood to adolescent years, he lived his younger sister Yuki and their grandfather-(who owns a kendo dojo) following the death of his parents.
Kai Sagano (嵯峨野 カイ, Sagano Kai)
Voiced by: Ryō Horikawa (Japanese); Michael Sinterniklaas (English)
The son of yakuza boss Takeshi Sagano from Osaka and Enjouji's younger half-brother. Despite being raised among the yakuza, he has no active role in his father's business. Masanori has been assigned as his father's successor when he retires, but Kai does not mind. His dealings with his father are extremely limited and they often fight with each other because, on the day of his mother's funeral, his father told him about Enjouji and his mother. Kai sees this other family as a betrayal and translates this into hatred against Enjouji. He is very talented at kendo and it is through it that he meets Ranmaru. He becomes fixated on him and his father eventually temporarily disowns him because of it. After resigning himself to an unrequited love, Kai focuses on kendo again and defeats Ranmaru in a match. Kai's relationship with Masanori is complex. Kai has always loved the much older man, but Masanori is afraid of his feelings for Kai. As such, Kai turns his attentions to Ranmaru. Once Kai is ready to focus on Masanori again, he has to practically beat the older man's head in to get his point across. Their relationship is sent into even bigger turmoil when Kai is raped by one of Masanori's scorned lovers, leaving him unable to handle intimacy without experiencing trauma. Kai feels guilty that he cannot overcome it, but Masanori understands and is willing to take things slow.
Masanori Araki (荒木 正典, Araki Masanori)
Voiced by: Akio Ōtsuka (Japanese); Dominic Moore (English)
A man of importance among the yakuza, selected by Takeshi Sagano himself to take over once he retires. The Araki family seems to be situated inside the yakuza lifestyle: Masanori's older brother Hitoshi is a member of the Kazama syndicate in the related series Hana to Ryū. He initially holds a low rank in the yakuza as Kai's caretaker. He falls in love with Kai's mother during that time and feels ashamed of his feelings. He has always been very protective of Kai but somewhat afraid of the affection Kai holds for him. When Kai holds on to those feelings in his adolescence, he becomes unnerved and pushes him away. Kai ends up falling in love with Ranmaru, while Masanori beds a few people to forget whatever feelings he might have held for Kai and his mother. When one of these bedfellows kidnaps and rapes Kai, however, Masanori wastes no time in killing him in revenge. Masanori later feels guilty because the attack was his fault, while Kai feels guilty because he feels that the scorned lover genuinely loved Masanori. The relationship between them is nearly permanently damaged, until Kai manages to put his feelings for Ranmaru aside and aggressively pursues the reluctant Masanori. Despite his disapproval of Enjouji's and Ranmaru's affair, he shows them the highest amount of respect out of loyalty to Sagano. He tries but fails to keep his growing relationship with Kai a secret, taking things slow in light of the trauma Kai suffered.
Yuki Samejima (鮫島 由紀, Samejima Yuki)
Voiced by: Akiko Hiramatsu (Japanese); Kelly Ray (English)
Ranmaru's younger sister, who appears in the second OVA. She also appears in the spin-off series, "Sessa Takuma!" where she falls in love with and marries Takuma Ban (Takuma Ban (禁止 琢磨, Ban Takuma) her high school sweetheart; after graduating from high school she bears a son named Takumi.
Roy Karstein-Tashiro (ロイ・田代, Roi Karusteinu Tashiro)
On the surface, he seems an easy-going Eurasian who makes light of any situation, but in fact he is a well-trained hit man trusted by the Sagano syndicate. Before becoming a hit man, he worked at a church/orphanage. When one of the girls is gang-raped and the caretaker refuses to allow police intervention, Roy swears revenge. He meets J.B., a trained hit man visiting the church, and convinces him to teach him how to use a gun. During this time, he starts to feel attracted to J.B.. J.B. does not appear interested at first, but ends up kissing him. As Roy prepares to go kill the ones that raped his friend, J.B. tells him that he was not trained to kill, but to protect. Hearing this, Roy goes into a rage. He goes looking for the rapists and is almost killed when he hesitates to kill them, if not for J.B.'s intervention. They spend the night together. J.B. then disappears, leaving Roy a message advising him to find another way of life. Roy decides to become a hit man anyway, hoping to find J.B. again. His job takes him to Japan, where he is known only as Tashiro. The Sagano syndicate hires him to kill the man who tried to mow down Enjouji with a car. Tashiro does the deed, but this further incites the wrath of the enemy organization the man was working for. Years later, the Sagano syndicate hires him to guard Kai from that same organization. It is during this job that Tashiro runs into J.B. again, who now works for the opposing organization. In the end, J.B. refuses to follow an order and the two are reunited. Recognizing that Tashiro wilfully chose the life of a hit man and that he had been looking for him all that time, the two hook up as a double team and do jobs together, while rekindling their old flame.
J.B. (ジェイ.蜂, Jay Bii)
One of the best hit men in the world. He is very calculating in his jobs and makes sure to follow through with them, but he is not a bloodthirsty killer. He is constantly ashamed of his profession and has a strict code to never harm any children. He is originally hired to kill Enjouji, but refuses because of his young age. He once visits a church/orphanage after carrying out a job, where he meets an overeager Tashiro. He becomes quite fond of him. When one of the girls at the orphanage is gang-raped, Tashiro is rearing to kill the men responsible. J.B. tries to diffuse that notion, but eventually relents and teaches him how to kill. As Tashiro rushes in to kill the rapists, J.B.'s interference is the only thing that saves him. Not wanting Tashiro to get involved in such a dark way of life, he leaves the younger man after taking him to bed. He continues his life as a hit man until he gets a job in Japan to kill Sagano, Masanori and Tashiro. Although he accepts the job, he is not wild about killing Tashiro and seeks the younger man out several times to try to get him to leave Japan. Tashiro will not be deterred, however, and each attempt to carry out their jobs, even being on opposing sides. In the end, J.B. cannot follow through with the job, since Kai, whom he considers a child, throws himself in front of Masanori as J.B. is set to shoot him. In the aftermath, J.B. and Tashiro are reunited as lovers and they start working jobs as a team.
Rena (レナ)
A transgender woman and a friend of Kei's from work who was mistaken by Ranmaru as Kei's girlfriend. Her father owns a love hotel called Hotel Castle.
Kayoko (佳代子)
Rena's friend who made a prank phone call to Kei and Ranmaru.

== Production ==
Kazuma Kodaka used one of her doujinshi, a one-shot called "Fierce Love", as the first chapter of Kizuna. She developed the story using characters from Sessa Takuma, which she had previously published in 1989 in Weekly Shōnen Champion. According to Kat Avila of the comics webzine Sequential Tart, "When Kizuna was just a doujinshi, her current editor took it to the Biblos company president who didn't like it. Her editor told him, 'You can fire me if it doesn't sell.' Fortunately, Kizuna went on to become successful."

== Media ==
=== Manga ===
Kazuma Kodaka's manga Kizuna: Bonds of Love was published in Japan first by Biblos and then by Libre Publishing, after the first company declared bankruptcy. The series' eleven volumes were released between December 1992 and September 2008.

In North America, the series was partially released in English by Be Beautiful, which went out of business after the ninth volume. In March 2010, Digital Manga Publishing (DMP) announced that it had acquired the license. The company then released the entire series in six volumes, from September 2010 to May 2012.

In the translated version by Be Beautiful, the characters refer to Kei Enjouji as "Kei" rather than by his surname. There are also some changes in the art, most significantly in the first volume, where several panels containing images of a very young Kai kissing Masanori on the lips were removed. A flashback to this scene in the second volume was edited so that a thought bubble obscured the image of young Kai, only showing Masanori's face.

Kizuna has also been translated into several other languages. It has been published in Italian by Kappa Edizioni, in French by Tonkam, in German by Carlsen Verlag and Spain by Norma Editorial.

Japanese			English (Be Beautiful)		English (DMP)		
No.	Release date	ISBN	Release date	ISBN	Release date	ISBN	No.
1	December 1992	ISBN 978-4882711506	September 2004	ISBN 978-1586649562	September 22, 2010	ISBN 9781569701775	1
2	June 1994	ISBN 978-4882712398	July 2005	ISBN 978-1586649579	September 22, 2010	ISBN 9781569701775	1
3	February 1996	ISBN 978-4882713814	December 2004	ISBN 978-1586649586	January 31, 2011	ISBN 9781569701782	2
4	February 1998	ISBN 978-4882717584	June 2005	ISBN 978-1586648039	January 31, 2011	ISBN 9781569701782	2
5	January 1999	ISBN 978-4882719281	January 2006	ISBN 978-1933440064	May 23, 2011	ISBN 9781569701799	3
6	November 1999	ISBN 978-4882715924	November 2006	ISBN 978-1933440071	May 23, 2011	ISBN 9781569701799	3
7	November 2000	ISBN 978-4835211206	February 2007	ISBN 978-1933440149	September 19, 2011	ISBN 9781569701805	4
8	July 2001	ISBN 978-4835212166	May 2007	ISBN 978-1933440156	September 19, 2011	ISBN 9781569701805	4
9	February 2003	ISBN 978-4835214177	August 2007	ISBN 978-1933440163	January 17, 2012	ISBN 9781569701812	5
10	March 2005	ISBN 978-4835217208	—	—	January 17, 2012	ISBN 9781569701812	5
11	September 2008	ISBN 978-4862634597	—	—	May 30, 2012	ISBN 9781569701829	6

=== OVAs ===
Kazuma Kodaka was first approached about making an OVA adaptation of Kizuna by the production company her editor's older brother worked for as a voice actor. In 1994, two OVAs, both approximately 30 minutes long and directed by Rin Hiroo, were distributed to Japanese audiences in DVD format by Daiei. The two OVAs follow the most important events of the first volumes of the manga. Kazuma Kodaka was actively involved in their production. Sequential Tart writer Kat Avila comments on how "the anime has streamlined storytelling and powerful camera shots. Key moments are artistically highlighted by sketchbook-like stills."

Several versions of these two OVAs have been distributed in the United States. The first release was by Culture Q Connection in 2001. It featured both OVAs, subtitled only. In 2005, Be Beautiful distributed a new version of the subtitled OVAs with greater image and subtitle quality. They released each episode separately. Most recently, in 2006, the OVAs were released together in a "Kazuma Kodaka Signature Edition" by Be Beautiful. This special edition featured over ninety minutes of extras, among which a reproduction of Kazuma Kodaka's autograph, an interview with the author and footage of an autograph session held in New York. This was also the first release to contain an English dubbed version of the OVAs.

The third OVA, subtitled "Much Ado About Nothing", is approximately 45 minutes long and came out in 2001. It was released in an English subtitled version by Kitty/Media Blasters in 2005.

=== Drama CD ===
A drama CD adaptation of the early parts of the manga titled Kizuna: You're All... was released in 1998 (catalog number: MMCM-3004). This drama CD was reissued on March 23, 2000, by Geneon Entertainment, with a sleeve featuring exclusive artwork (catalog number: MMCC-3708). The drama CD is approximately one hour long and features little adult content, focusing instead on the more romantic and dramatic aspects of the story. It includes voice acting by Kazuya Ichijō (as Kei Enjouji), Ryō Horikawa (as Kai Sagano), Akio Ōtsuka (as Masanori Araki) and Ryōtarō Okiayu (as Ranmaru Samejima), who also sings the ending theme Tada Hitotsu no Shinjitsu (ただひとつの真実; lit. 'There is Only One Truth'). The characters Enjouji and Kai both use a Kansai dialect in this CD.

Kizuna: You're All...
No.	Title	Length
1.	"Futari" (ふたり)
2.	"Deai" (出会い)
3.	"An'un" (暗雲)
4.	"Kyūsoku, Soshite..." (休息、そして...)
5.	"Mezame" (目覚め)
6.	"Omou Mono" (想う者)
7.	"Tsugerareta Genjitsu" (告げられた現実)
8.	"Kizuna" (絆)
9.	"Tada Hitotsu no Shinjitsu" (ただひとつの真実)

== Hana to Ryū ==
- Hana to Ryū

華と龍
- Manga
- Written by: Kazuma Kodaka
- Original run: 1993 – 2010
- Volumes: 23

Hana to Ryū (華と龍; lit. "Flower and Dragon") is a yaoi manga series created by Kazuma Kodaka in 1993. Designed as a doujinshi, Hana to Ryū follows Ryūji Kazama, the son of a dead yakuza boss, as he struggles to maintain a peaceful existence while dealing with harmful forces all around him. Hana to Ryū takes place in the universe Kizuna, taking place 10–15 years before it.

=== Plot ===
The Kazama syndicate had been one of the most powerful and respected yakuza syndicates in Japan. But one day, the leader of the syndicate is brutally murdered and the syndicate is brought down as members of the organization are forced to scatter. Among these are Kazama's young children, including his oldest son Ryūji. They take refuge with their aunt and in time forget the tragedy that befell their family.

Years later, when Ryūji has grown into a teenager, he comes home to find his aunt being gang-raped by apparently random thugs. The violence then escalates out of control and leaves everyone in the room dead, except for Ryūji who is covered in blood. Though it's unclear what exactly transpired in the room, Ryūji's arrested for all the murders, tried, and sentenced to life in prison.

Ryūji spends only four years in prison, but it's not an easy time for him. Brutally beaten and gang-raped constantly, he becomes bitter at the world and wishes for death. But it's in prison that he meets former allies of his father's organization and he truly learns what he is. He even gains the strength to stand up to his tormentors, although his actions will later come back to haunt him.

Upon his release Ryūji meets up with an older man named Hitoshi Araki, who comes to his aid when a thug tries to mug him. But Hitoshi isn't some stranger; he too was part of the Kazama syndicate—more so, one of Ryūji's father's most trusted allies and Ryūji's protector when Ryūji was younger. It's through Hitoshi that Ryūji begins to get a sense of his humility and innocence back and the two men form a deep, unbreakable bond that gradually grows into love.

Unfortunately for these two, being in with the yakuza won't give them an easy life of peace. And though Ryūji had already suffered so much in his young life, it's only inevitable that it gets worse for him.

=== Trivia ===
- Hana to Ryū crosses over with Kizuna in issues 11–12, when Hitoshi and Ryūji pay the Sagano group a visit. Here Ryūji meets a much younger Sagano Kai and Masanori, Hitoshi's little brother, who are main characters in Kizuna. Perhaps in a humorous twist Kai becomes aggressively attached to Ryūji in his short stay and Masanori seems unable to keep an eye on him (even getting kicked in the groin for briefly ignoring Kai).
