= Imadoki no Vampire: Bloody Bride =

1996 video game

- Developers: Jorudan (programming); Opus (sound); Avit (graphics)
- Publisher: Atlus
- Platform: PlayStation
- Release: JP: December 27, 1996
- Genre: Dating sim
- Mode: Single player

Imadoki no Vampire: Bloody Bride (Note: Japanese: いまどきのバンパイアBloody Bride; lit. Modern Vampires: Bloody Bride) is a 1996 dating sim for the PlayStation. It waspublished by Atlus. In the game, the players controls a young vampire who has reached adulthood. He is sent to earth to suck the blood of a girl with a 'platinum aura'. However the girl has to willingly allow him to suck her blood. The character is given three years to complete his mission.

== Reception ==
Reception

Review scores
Publication	Score
Famitsu	7/10, 5/10, 7/10, 7/10
GameSpot	5.5/10
Dengeki PlayStation	85/100, 75/100

Imadoki no Vampire: Bloody Bride was released in Japan for the PlayStation on December 27, 1996.

Four writers for Famitsu reviewed the game. One reviewer commented that with dating, training, fighting monsters and raising familiars there was plenty to do in the game which would either hook viewers or leave them feeling scattered. Two reviewers commented that the RPG-like battle sequences were poor with one saying it only featured a single flashing image. While one reviewer said the visuals in the game might not be for everyone, two found the characters appropriately charming. One reviewer in Dengeki PlayStation found the atmosphere of the game to be like an anime series which they said may divide opinions. One reviewer in the magazine said the stories became long-winded while another said the conversations between characters and storylines were good and liked how cute the girls and familiars were.

Glenn Rubenstein, reviewing the game for GameSpot, complemented its depth and graphics, but criticised its sound. He recommended it for people "big on imports and anime".

== See also ==
- List of PlayStation games
- Video games in Japan
