= Loveless (manga) =

2002 manga and 2005 anime

- Cover of the first manga volume

ラブレス (Raburesu)
- Genre: Mystery, romance, supernatural
- Manga
- Written by: Yun Kōga
- Published by: Ichijinsha
- English publisher: AUS: Madman Entertainment; NA: Tokyopop (former) Viz Media
- Magazine: Monthly Comic Zero Sum
- Original run: May 2002 – present
- Volumes: 13
- Anime television series
- Directed by: Yū Kō
- Produced by: Junka Kobayashi; Kozue Kaneniwa; Yūko Kon; Yūji Matsukura; Schreck Hedwick
- Written by: Yūji Kawahara
- Music by: Masanori Sasaji
- Studio: J.C.Staff
- Licensed by: AUS: Madman Entertainment; NA: Media Blasters
- Original network: TV Asahi
- Original run: April 7, 2005 – June 30, 2005
- Episodes: 12
- Light novel
- Written by: Aya Natsui
- Illustrated by: Yun Kōga
- Published by: Ichijinsha
- Imprint: Ichijinsha Bunko Iris
- Published: July 19, 2008

Loveless (Japanese: ラブレス, Hepburn: Raburesu) is a Japanese manga series written and illustrated by Yun Kōga. It is serialized in the Japanese magazine Monthly Comic Zero Sum by Ichijinsha and collected in thirteen tankōbon as of July 2017. Kōga plans to end the manga at fifteen volumes.

A 12-episode anime television series adaptation was made by J.C. Staff, broadcast in a post-midnight slot on TV Asahi and ABC from April 2005 to June 2005. The anime series was licensed and released in the US by Media Blasters in a set of 3 DVDs in early 2006.

The most immediately noticeable aspect of the story is that many characters are nekomimi—cat-like features (in this case, ears and tails) are universal from birth, so there are as many catboys, including the protagonist, as there are catgirls. People in the Loveless universe lose their animal features when they lose their virginity. Those who no longer have animal features are differentiated by society as "adults".

== Plot ==
In his first day at his new school, a then twelve-year-old Ritsuka Aoyagi meets a mysterious twenty-year-old male named Soubi Agatsuma. Soubi claims to be a good friend of Ritsuka's brother, Seimei, who was murdered 2 years earlier. Upon the inspection of Seimei's abandoned computer files, Ritsuka discovers that an organization called 'Septimal Moon' (七つの月, Nanatsu no tsuki) was responsible for Seimei's death.

As Ritsuka quickly discovers, Seimei and Soubi acted as a pair involved in spell battles invoked by carefully selected words. Now Soubi is Ritsuka's 'sentouki', or Fighter Unit, and Ritsuka is his 'Sacrifice'. Together, they challenge Septimal Moon to find out the truth behind Seimei's murder and the reason for Ritsuka's amnesia, and form an intimate bond as they unravel the mystery.

== Characters ==
=== Main characters ===
Ritsuka Aoyagi (青柳立夏, Aoyagi Ritsuka)
Voiced by: Junko Minagawa (Japanese); Ashley Thrill (English)

Ritsuka Aoyagi as he appears in the manga

Ritsuka is twelve years old and the protagonist of the story. He was named after the lunar day "Rikka," which fell on May 5 in the year 2005. His "true name" is Loveless, although it is yet to be seen on his body as the other teams' names are. He enjoys taking photographs and "making memories."
In the first volume, the story alludes to an abrupt change of personality occurring in Ritsuka two years prior. It is seen often through flashbacks, when his mother beats him and denies that he is truly Ritsuka and that he is actually someone else in his body. Before this change, he was a popular, yet academically average student; he does not get along with his classmates, and he purposely points out their faults. In contrast to this, he is the perfect student. In addition to the personality change, he suffers a loss in memory. The cause of these drastic changes is still unknown, although he has regular therapy sessions to determine why.
On his first day at his new school, Ritsuka meets Soubi Agatsuma. Soubi confuses him with his sudden intimacy and puzzling claims that he was Seimei's friend and Fighter Unit. As Ritsuka discovers, Seimei's impromptu will dictates that Soubi shall "become Ritsuka's" upon his death.
Ritsuka and Soubi's relationship is complex, but in many ways Ritsuka admires Soubi. However, Ritsuka has trouble trusting others, and Soubi's various secrets continue to have an adverse effect on this.
Despite his young age and inexperience, Ritsuka is very intelligent and approaches things with startling maturity. The circumstances of his life encourage his lack of innocence; however, there have been notable incidents that bare his naïveté, particularly in sexual love and healthy relationships. Despite this, he still has firm opinions and unrelenting ideas about those subjects. It is these opinions that clash dramatically with adults and authority figures around him, most notably Soubi. Ritsuka is a pacifist, and strongly opposes violence under any circumstance.
Love is an uncomfortable subject for Ritsuka. He is wary of compliments, and does not like affection. Ritsuka's inner conflict over believing Soubi's declarations of love becomes a source of great tension and bitterness in their relationship.

Soubi Agatsuma (我妻草灯, Agatsuma Sōbi)
Voiced by: Katsuyuki Konishi (Japanese); Anthony Lawson (English)

Soubi Agatsuma as he appears in the manga

Soubi is a twenty-year-old student, studying Japanese art. He is a former student of Shichisei Gakuen ("Seven Moons Academy"), a school for fighters, where Ritsu Minami was his teacher. He arrived at the school and became Ritsu's student after the death of his brother, who was Ritsu's former partner. Ritsu raised Soubi and, incidentally, was the person that took his ears. Whether it was a consensual act or not was not specified. It is hinted by another teacher at the school that Ritsu took Soubi's virginity because Soubi had his mother's face, which made Ritsu desire him. Ritsu explains to Soubi that he took his ears to make him a better fighter.
Soubi is later partnered with Seimei. He does not enjoy this, feeling attached to Ritsu and resenting that Seimei is younger than he is. Seimei notices this and mocks Soubi for feeling attached to Ritsu. He later carved the name 'Beloved' into Soubi's neck, making him his fighter unit.
As ordered, Soubi contacted Ritsuka after Seimei's death. He introduced Ritsuka to the world of fighters and sacrifices and told Ritsuka he would be his Fighter Unit. He fought beside Seimei for some time, and many people believe that he is Beloved's Fighter Unit. The appearance of Nisei in the manga, however, proves this to be false later in the manga. Soubi now fights for Ritsuka as Loveless, which is considered taboo because there is not a fighter-sacrifice bond between them. There is also a severe loss of strength, and in Soubi's case, his markings bleed in battle. Soubi was revealed to not have a true name at all—in fact, Ritsu comments that he is a blank slate, and whatever marking he is given becomes his name. Since Seimei carved Beloved into his skin, it became his name. When given a command to break the windows, courtesy of Seimei, in volume 8, it is shown that he cannot disobey, no matter how strongly he is against it.
Soubi appears to know much more about Seimei and his cause of death than he will divulge. Despite Ritsuka's insistence that he tell him everything he knows, Soubi refuses. In volume 5 of the manga, he even says, "Seimei is my God." He openly declares that he lives his life by Seimei's orders, but still says he will obey Ritsuka's every order, which is not necessarily true. Because Seimei told Soubi not to tell Ritsuka about the seven moons he cannot tell him.

=== Minor characters ===
Yuiko Hawatari (羽渡唯子, Hawatari Yuiko)
Voiced by: Kana Ueda (Japanese); Shannon Settlemyre (English)
Yuiko is Ritsuka's classmate. Despite her ditzy, bubbly exterior, she is sharp and goodhearted. Ritsuka at first found her annoying. On Ritsuka's first day in school, she immediately is overcome with awe and a fascination for him, and has feelings for him. At the prodding of her mean-spirited classmates, she befriends him, although he is very reluctant to accept her because he thinks she is weird and unintelligent. As Ritsuka overcomes his initial impressions of her, they become good friends.
Yuiko and Ritsuka's friendship greatly irritates their classmate, Yayoi. He had been recently rejected by Yuiko, although rather sorrowfully, claiming she will only date boys taller than her. Much to Yuiko's dismay, Ritsuka insists their friendship is platonic and it, indeed, remains that way. However, in two separate confessions to Hitomi Shinonome, Yuiko professes her love and devotion to Ritsuka. Ritsuka seems to trust Yuiko, despite his own issues with that kind of bond.
As the series progresses, a rather unusual, yet harmonious, friendship is struck between Yuiko and Soubi. Although it seems their personalities would clash, they have a unique understanding of each other.
Yuiko is characterized by her large breasts and considerable height. At 168 cm tall, Yuiko is much taller than Ritsuka and her other classmates and is often mistaken for being older than she actually is.

Kio Kaidou as he appears in the manga

Kio Kaidou (海堂貴緒, Kaidō Kio)
Voiced by: Ken Takeuchi (Japanese); Jack W. Gibson (English)
He is a good friend and current classmate of Soubi's. They are both art students. They study the Japanese art of flowers. He describes himself as Soubi's only friend. Most of his early dialogue is filled with flirtations and passes at Soubi, despite being gently ignored or indirectly rejected each time.
Despite his early presence as a character who exists solely to create a lighter atmosphere among a very dark story, he gradually gains depth as the story progresses. He becomes a loud voice that champions pacifism and self-worth. This contrasts strongly against Soubi's submissive nature that willingly accepts violent treatment and strongly desires to be completely controlled, albeit from only very certain people. More significantly, Kio's views are shared by Ritsuka. Together, they provide a very black-and-white atmosphere that allows only one line of thinking.
It was recently revealed that Soubi only became interested in Kio because of a tattoo on his back, and a vow that he took when he got it.
He has a daughter that looks to be around ten years old; she notably has no cat ears. A twin sister also appeared but he had no knowledge of her.
Hitomi Shinonome (東雲瞳, Shinonome Hitomi)
Voiced by: Mamiko Noto (Japanese); Jaymie Krasinski (English)
She is Ritsuka, Yuiko and Yayoi's teacher. She is very naive and innocent, and painfully aware of these characteristics. At twenty-three years old, she is teased and ridiculed for retaining her ears (and therefore her virginity) to such an age. She is visibly embarrassed, but as the story progresses, she gains confidence and pride over making her own choices.
Hitomi is greatly troubled by Ritsuka's mother and the injuries he sustains from her, and greatly desires to involve herself in the situation to make a change, despite her fears and her colleagues' dissent.
Her very caring and naive nature clashes spectacularly when confronted with Soubi. He brusquely rejects her and says he does not care for older women, although she has never made a romantic move towards him and is no more than three years older than he is. Despite his cold treatment, Hitomi seems to have had some feelings for Soubi. His brash actions are mysterious—the only discernible reason being a general hatred towards teachers as a result of his experiences with Ritsu Minami.
Although he has rejected her, it can be noted that Soubi enjoys tormenting her to some degree.
This kind of behavior towards Hitomi may have stemmed from jealousy. Soubi refers to Hitomi as 'childish', despite her being three years older than he is. Yet he still respectfully calls her "Shinonome-sensei." The only way he degrades her is by her sexuality, possibly because Hitomi has remained a virgin while he lost his ‘ears’ at a much earlier age. In comparison with his extreme dislike of his own teacher figure, Ritsu, Soubi still manages to treat Hitomi as a subordinate, constantly belittling her.
Misaki Aoyagi (青柳美咲, Aoyagi Misaki)
Voiced by: Wakana Yamazaki (Japanese); Ashley Thrill (English)
She is the mother of Seimei and Ritsuka. She has an important influence over her sons. Being emotionally and mentally weak, Misaki has very little grip on reality, and often hallucinates, particularly after certain events in volume 5. She is abusive and violent and blames Ritsuka's personality change for the reason Seimei "left", demanding that she wants her former Ritsuka back when she beats him. To many, she is seen as a monster, but in volume 5, she has inner dialogues of her own, allowing the reader to witness a more human, fragile side to her behavior which she cannot control.
Yayoi Shioiri (塩入弥生, Shioiri Yayoi)
Voiced by: Jun Fukuyama (Japanese); Michael Yeager (English)
Yayoi is another classmate of Ritsuka's. He is shown as being socially awkward and with low self-esteem, and feels great jealousy towards Ritsuka. Yayoi admits that he loves Yuiko, but when he confessed to her, he was rejected for being too short. Yuiko claims that she only dates boys taller than her, but the truthfulness of that statement is called into question when it is painfully obvious she loves Ritsuka, who is barely taller than Yayoi.
Despite his jealousy of Ritsuka's close friendship with Yuiko, he is encouraged by Ritsuka's adamant claims that their relationship is purely platonic. He makes a firm statement he will not give up on Yuiko, and spends more time with her than ever.
It is notable that in the manga, Yayoi has a rather small role. He is absent for large parts of the story, and has only a small amount of dialogue. In the anime, they utilized his character much more to enhance the would-be Yayoi-Yuiko-Ritsuka love triangle, and to inject comic relief into a dark story.
Nagisa Sagan (目渚, Sagan Nagisa)
Voiced by: Sanae Kobayashi (Japanese); Ashley Thrill (English)
She is an easily angered woman who conducts experiments and creates humans who cannot feel physical pain. Although Nagisa is very young in appearance, it is later revealed that Nagisa is over 30 years old. Her background, and affiliation are unknown. She had a sister, but what has become of her has not yet been confirmed. She created Youji after the image of her younger sister, perhaps in remembrance or to ease the pain in her heart, but exact reasons are still unknown. Her over-the-top behavior and strange lifestyle leaves her alone and alienated. She befriends Nana, and shamefully confesses that she is her only friend.
Her relationship with Ritsu is an intriguing one. She puts up a front of hating him deeply, and wishing for nothing more than to see him fail. However, there are small moments that reveal possibly more intimate feelings, as she blushes deeply whenever he is near her or touches her, though she steadfastly denies caring for him. Starting in volume 3 and finishing in volume 4, she makes a bet with Ritsu that her older Zero pair, Yamato and Kouya, can beat Ritsuka's Soubi. Ultimately, Yamato and Kouya are defeated, and Nagisa's sibling rivalry-like attitude towards Ritsu continues. Also when Seimei gouges out Ritsu's eyes she goes crazy, showing more than she probably intended of her true feelings for him, but still denies it when her Zeros make fun of her over it.
Natsuo Sagan (目奈津生, Sagan Natsuo)
Voiced by: Mitsuki Saiga (Japanese); Ashley Crist (English)
He is the fighter of the male Zero pair. He is one of Nagisa's experiments, and presumably the second generation of Zeros. He first makes an appearance in volume 2, when he and Youji corner Soubi when he is alone. When Soubi wins the battle, Natsuo tells him that he and Youji have no place to return to if they lose a battle. Soubi offers to let them live at his apartment, and Natsuo warily accepts. Natsuo seems to care for Soubi and Ritsuka, and in turn, does nothing to harm them.
In one of the Zero-sum chapters, they are told to defeat Seimei. But because of the other's unusual power with words, the Zero team was rendered practically useless. In the past Natsuo pulled his own eye out but he felt nothing, because the Zero pair feels no pain.
Youji Sagan (目瑤二, Sagan Yōuji)
Voiced by: Hiroyuki Yoshino (Japanese); Shannon Settlemyre (English)
He is the sacrifice of the male Zero pair. He is the more cruel and brutal of the two; however, they are both rather blunt and cold towards others. Like Natsuo, Youji seems to care for Soubi and Ritsuka, and in turn, does nothing to harm them.
Nagisa is unashamedly biased towards Youji, often ignoring Natsuo. According to Youji, this is because he bears a significant resemblance to Nagisa's younger sister.
In one of the Zero-sum chapters, they are told to defeat Seimei. But because of the other's unusual power with words, the Zero team was rendered practically useless.
Kouya Sakagami (坂上江夜, Sakagami Kōya)
Voiced by: Rie Kugimiya (Japanese); Renale Hailey (English)
She is the fighter of the female Zero pair. Until they met, both pairs believed they were the only Zero pair to exist. Both teams are experiments created by Nagisa at different times, and the female pair is presumably the first generation. Despite their unusual background, both Kouya and Yamato attend high school, although different ones.
In a demonstration of the series' fictional world's rules and expectations of society, Kouya wears fake cat ears despite not being a virgin. Yamato often teases her about it, particularly because Yamato does not try to hide her status. They lost their "ears" to each other. Shortly, after they first met, Kouya slit her wrists just to "know how it would feel", since Zeroes cannot feel pain.
Yamato Nakano (中野倭, Nakano Yamato)
Voiced by: Yumi Kakazu (Japanese); Li Clapp (English)
She is the sacrifice of the female Zero pair. In contrast to Kouya's solemness, Yamato has an outgoing, vivacious personality. Their relationship is the focus of a mini-arc in volume 4.
The relationship Yamato has with Kouya is a passionate and dedicated one that becomes unexpectedly stressful for Yamato in volume 4. Her marking, which she interprets as physical proof of her relationship with Kouya, slowly fades without warning. In a blatant reference to the homosexual nature of their relationship, both girls' markings—a 0 with a line through the middle—are on the same place: their breast. She once invites Ritsuka to a coffee shop, and reminisces the first time she and Kouya met. When she saw what Kouya did to her wrists, she got the cutter and slit her wrists too, in which point Kouya apprehends her. She replies that whatever injury Kouya has, it will also appear on her. She holds her wounded hand to her heart, and says "it's beginning to hurt, here." In the coffee shop, Ritsuka accidentally spilled some coffee on her blouse, a result of being surprised when she said she is going to show him her mark (her breast). She goes in the bathroom claiming it is in order to remove the stain since it is going to spread. Inside, she opens her blouse and stares at her mark, which is beginning to fade, meaning it will not be long before she is not going to be Kouya's sacrifice anymore.
During their fight with Loveless and Soubi, her mark has completely disappeared, so she had to endure all of Soubi's attack. Kouya does not know so she proceeds fighting. However, when Yamato is brought on her knees by the pain, Kouya begins suspecting, in which Yamato vehemently refuses and says "it doesn't hurt!" Kouya forcibly opens Yamato's blouse, and sees that the zero mark has completely disappeared. She withdraws from the fight, even if it means certain outcomes. They decide to die together and be reborn than to live separately.
Ritsu Minami (南律, Minami Ritsu)
Voiced by: Takehito Koyasu (Japanese); Marc Matney (English)
He is Soubi's former teacher, and held a very influential role in Soubi's life when he was still his teacher. The extent of their master/slave relationship is left unknown, but it is clear that Ritsu misses those days. In the few times they have made contact within the current timeline, Soubi acts very brusque and treats him with disgust. It is also revealed that he was the one who took away Soubi's virginity. Ritsu is said to have been the Sacrifice to Soubi's mother, which led to him and Soubi meeting.
In one of the Zero-sum chapters Ritsu has his eyes gouged out by Seimei, so he could write a message to Ritsuka on the wall in the man's blood.
In the latest chapter of Zero-Sum Monthly Comic (March 2008), the seven members of Septimal Moon were revealed. Included as members were Ritsu Minami, Nagisa Sagan, and Nana. Both Ritsu and Nagisa had previously denied any affiliation with the Septimal Moon.
Ritsu is the only blind character in the series.

=== Manga characters ===
Seimei Aoyagi (青柳清明, Aoyagi Seimei)
Voiced by: Ken Narita (Japanese); Jonathan Knight (English)
He is Ritsuka's older brother. Born on November 14, his name comes from the lunar day "Seimei", which falls around April 4. He was seventeen when he was found murdered in Ritsuka's classroom, although he died under mysterious circumstances and could only be identified by his dental records. We later learn that Seimei had faked his death, but who the person was that died in his place has not yet been revealed. He is also the sacrifice of the Beloved pair. Soubi was given to Seimei (mostly at Seimei's request) as a fighter when Seimei was only fourteen years old.
When Ritsuka lost his memory, Seimei stepped in and became an extremely important figure in his life. He protected Ritsuka from their abusive mother, Misaki, and was a great source of comfort and trust. As a result, Ritsuka was hit hardest of all by the news of his brother's death. Ritsuka is very bitter and vengeful towards those who may have been involved in the murder of his brother.
His personality is subject of great debate, and many readers have very different interpretations of his actions. To make things more confusing, the characters in the story themselves clash with their different beliefs and experiences. Ritsuka claims Seimei was a kind, gentle, loving person that always protected him. Soubi, on the other hand, is almost afraid and spiteful of Seimei. He tells Youji he would have to wait a hundred years before Seimei would speak to him. Ritsuka believes Seimei protected him from his abusive mother, Misaki. Others, such as Nagisa and 7, think he was cruel, merciless, and hateful. They claim Seimei acted strangely and would be close to no one, and go so far as refusing to eat in the presence of anyone else. Soubi's friend Kio bitterly resents Seimei for the apparently abusive manner in which he treated Soubi, but Soubi refuses to back up Kio's accusations. Ritsuka denies all of this; however, he has some startling flashbacks that show a more disturbed, obsessive side of Seimei, and even sometimes borderline incestuous behavior towards Ritsuka. Seimei has said in Volume 7 that in his world, he and Ritsuka are the only two humans that exist and everyone else to him is an animal. He later states in volume 8 that Ritsuka is the only human alive that is exactly like him. When he meets Ritsuka again he asks Ritsuka if Ritsuka would still love him. He states that if Ritsuka loves him so much that Ritsuka would be able to give his whole being to him, his body, soul, love, and mind.
However, it has recently been rumored that Seimei does indeed have a violent personality, or destructive behavior at the very least. In volume eight, Seimei stabs the wary Ritsu in the eyes after the two have a short yet heated conversation about Soubi; the wounds leave Ritsu blind. Seimei then proceeded to write the haunting message "Ritsuka I'm Back," on the wall in Ritsu's blood for his brother, Ritsuka, to later see. However, he does seem to care about Ritsuka. There are also suggestions in canon that Seimei possesses powers beyond that of a normal sacrifice. He has been described as inhuman by Soubi and others.
Nisei Akame (赤目二世, Akame Nisei)
He first appeared in the manga in volume 5. Although his character is largely a mystery, he appears to be very devious. He is the real Fighter Unit of Beloved.
He helps keep track of Ritsuka by spying on him and reports the information back to a mysterious boss. He and Soubi meet in volume 6 and from then on, Nisei stops spying on Ritsuka, but his presence is still near.
His role in volume 5 was a pivotal one: he was first introduced as "Seimei," although he was only masquerading as Seimei to gain the trust of Misaki. It is unknown if it was carried out by Seimei's orders, but Nisei ended up drugging Misaki and trying in vain to convince her to murder Ritsuka, on the promise that Seimei would come back for good. Due to his smug demeanor and malicious behaviour towards Ritsuka, Nisei and Soubi have great animosity between each other. In volume 6, Soubi expresses his deep desire to murder Nisei at any cost. Volume 8 shows that he was captured by security at the Seven Voices Academy, but despite his struggles to respond to Seimei's calling, it appears that he was successfully restrained.
There is a strong belief among fans that Nisei is a sociopath, judging by his actions and the way he says he cannot experience feelings such as love or desire.
7 (ナナ, Nana)
Voiced by: Aya Hisakawa
She first appeared in volume 3 of the manga and Episode 12 in the anime. The strange coded message that Ritsuka receives from SLEEPLESS is from her. Ritsuka meets her in a special area of an MMORPG called Wisdom Resurrection several times to discuss Septimal Moon and Seimei. Her mission as stated in volume 5 is to determine whether Seimei really faked his death. She is a member of Septimal Moon, although her role in the organization (outside of the previously described mission) is unclear. She has tell-tale signs of a hikikomori, leaving her computer rarely and has even admitted to Nagisa she has no other friends.
Nakahira (なかひら, Nakahira)
A young man who still retains his ears and who first appears in volume 6. Little is known about Nakahira, although he seems protective and respectful of Chaco. His distrust and annoyance of Seimei is both shown and spoken. Nakahira owns a cat, named Shirokuro (しろくろ, Shirokuro), meaning white-black, who gives birth to four kittens. When told by Seimei that the cat would eat her young before allowing someone to take them away, Nakahira is plainly disgusted. Seimei usually refers to him as "Nakahira-san".
Osamu Kimizuka (Kimizuka Osamu)
Ritsuka's friend from his previous school. Her only appearance is in a side story in volume 4. She allows only Ritsuka to call her Osamu, but after a while lets Yuiko use it too. At first, Yuiko sees her as a love rival, but gradually they become friends and Osamu even shares her photos of Ritsuka with Yuiko.

== Themes ==
Loveless focuses on "the power of words in creating our reality, the meaning of memory, the strength of family, and the loss of innocence".

== Media ==
=== Manga ===
Written and illustrated by Yun Kōga, Loveless appears as a serial in Japanese magazine Monthly Comic Zero Sum, where it has been serialized since May 2002. The chapters are collected into tankōbon and published by Ichijinsha. Thirteen tankōbon have been released so far, with the first being published on July 1, 2002, and the thirteenth released on July 25, 2017.

Tokyopop licensed Loveless for an English-language release in North America. The first volume was published on February 7, 2006, and the eighth was released on September 1, 2008; Tokyopop then went out of business. In October 2011, Viz Media announced that they had acquired the license and would continue publishing the series from volume 9. Volume 13 was released on June 12, 2018. The series is also licensed in Australia and New Zealand by Madman Entertainment, in France by Soleil Manga, in Germany by Egmont Manga & Anime, in Italy by J-POP, in Russia by Comics Factory, and in Brazil by NewPOP.

=== Volume list ===
No.	Original release date	Original ISBN	North American release date	North American ISBN
01	July 1, 2002	978-4-7580-5002-9	February 7, 2006	1-59816-221-7
Chapters 0-4.2
02	December 26, 2002	978-4-7580-5011-1	June 13, 2006	1-59816-222-5
Chapters 1–6
03	June 25, 2003	978-4-7580-5034-0	October 10, 2006	1-59816-223-3
Chapters 1-8
04	June 25, 2004	978-4-7580-5077-7	February 13, 2007	978-1-59816-224-0
Chapters 1-10
05	February 25, 2005	978-4-7580-5120-0	May 8, 2007	978-1-59816-225-7
Chapters 1-10
06	December 24, 2005	978-4-7580-5198-9	August 7, 2007	978-1-59816-864-8
Chapters 1-8
07	November 25, 2006	978-4-7580-5254-2	November 13, 2007	1-4278-0457-5
Chapters 1-5.1
08	February 25, 2008	978-4-7580-5329-7	September 1, 2008	1-4278-1302-7
Chapters 1-2
09	November 25, 2009	978-4-7580-5457-7	September 11, 2012	978-1-4215-4324-6
Chapters 1-19
10	May 25, 2011	978-4-7580-5599-4	January 8, 2013	1-4215-4325-7
Chapters 1-101.5
11	July 25, 2012	978-4-7580-5727-1	June 11, 2013	1-4215-5381-3
Chapters 102-110
12	December 25, 2013	978-4-7580-5870-4	August 12, 2014	1-4215-7349-0
Chapters 111-119
13	July 25, 2017	978-4-7580-3204-9	June 12, 2018	1-9747-0067-4

=== Light novel ===
A light novel Loveless – Ephemeral Bonds was written by Natsui Aya and illustrated by Yun Kōga. It was published in July 2008 in Iris magazine by Ichijinsha, the original Loveless publisher.

=== Anime ===
A 12-episode anime adaptation was made by J.C.Staff, and first aired in Japan from April 2005 to June 2005. The episodes covered approximately volumes 1–4, due to production starting in August 2004—about four months before volume 5 was published. Because the source material had not finished its serialization, and with a limit of 12 episodes, the anime adaptation has quite a few differences. The most notable is the series finale, which was written specifically for the anime and left the storyline open to the possibility of a future sequel. The opening theme music was "Tsuki no Curse" and the ending theme was "Michiyuki"; both were composed by Yuki Kajiura and arranged by Masayuki Sakamoto, and performed by Kaori Hikita. Media Blasters licensed and released an English subtitled version in early 2006. On April 26, 2011, Media Blasters re-released the series with an English dub titling it as "Loveless: Vocal Collection". The series is also licensed in German by Tokyopop.

=== CDs ===
Geneon Entertainment published multiple Loveless drama CDs. It re-released five drama CDs based on the manga from October 24, 2007, to December 2, 2007. Four drama CDs based on the anime adaption were released from May 25, 2005, to September 22, 2005. Another set of drama CDs based on the anime adaption, Hairless and Actless, were released on April 23, 2008, and May 23, 2008, respectively. Five character drama CDs were released from May 25, 2006, to September 22, 2006.

Geneon Entertainment also released the soundtrack to the anime on June 24, 2005. The CD included the beginning and ending themes and fifteen background tracks. On September 8, 2006, a vocal album featuring songs performed by Konishi Katsuyuki, Junko Minagawa, and Jun Fukuyama was released.

== Reception ==
Some readers of Loveless regard the relationship between Soubi Agatsuma and Ritsuka Aoyagi as shotacon. IGN considers the relationship between Soubi and Ritsuka to be handled tastefully, despite their large age gap. Yun Kōga stated that she does not "consider it as yaoi" manga, although her "fans do".

Julie Rosato of Mania regards the art as beautiful, saying that she would read the story for the art alone, but fortunately the storyline is complex and dark.

The Book Report's Robin Brenner liked the art, describing it as "breathtaking—fluid, dark, and full of slicing edges". Brenner also commented that the series is "the kind of manga that startles a reader with just how close it treads to taboo lines without ever crossing over into true transgression."

T.A. Noonan describes the plot as "a nuanced tale of love, identity, self-discovery, and the power of language".
