= Fake (manga) =

Manga

- Cover of Fake by Sanami Matoh.

フェイク (Feiku)
- Genre: Shōnen-ai, action, comedy, yaoi
- Manga
- Written by: Sanami Matoh
- Published by: Biblos (former); Mediation (current)
- English publisher: AUS: Madman Entertainment; NA: COMPASS, Inc. Tokyopop (former)
- Magazine: Magazine Be × Boy
- Original run: June 1993 – June 2000
- Volumes: 7
- Manga

Fake 2
- Written by: Sanami Matoh
- Published by: Asuka Shisha
- Magazine: Hug
- Original run: 2007 – 2007
- Volumes: 5
- Manga

Fake 3
- Written by: Sanami Matoh
- Published by: Studio Thunder Comics
- Original run: 2010 – 2011
- Volumes: 3
- Original video animation
- Directed by: Iku Suzuki
- Written by: Akinori Endo
- Music by: Katsuo Ono
- Studio: J.C.Staff
- Licensed by: US: Media Blasters
- Released: April 21, 1996
- Runtime: 55 minutes

Fake (フェイク, Feiku) is a seven-volume BL manga by Sanami Matoh. The story focuses on a romance between Randy "Ryo" Maclean and Dee Laytner, two New York City detectives from the fictitious 27th precinct. An anime version of the fifth act (or chapter) from the second manga is also available, in the form of an OVA. Fake was serialized in the monthly yaoi manga magazine Magazine Be × Boy from June 1993 until June 2000, and later compiled into seven volumes by Biblos. After the company went bankrupt in 2006, Fake was republished by Mediation as five volumes, with one newly drawn extra story featured at the back of each. Fake's English translation was published by Tokyopop in the United States of America, and by Madman Entertainment in Australia and New Zealand. Fake was later released digitally by COMPASS, Inc. in 2021. All seven volumes are available in English. The one-off sequel "Like, like love" is only available in Japan as a part of an art book by Matoh.

On May 12, 2007, the manga Fake "Second Season", a sequel, premiered in a new Japanese magazine called Hug, also published by Mediation. COMPASS, Inc. published Fake "Second Season" digitally as Fake second in 2019.

== Summary ==
Randy "Ryo" Maclean, a half-Japanese cop, is new to the 27th Precinct in New York, where he is partnered with Dee Laytner, an American with an overconfident attitude. Dee develops a significant romantic interest in Ryo, but Ryo is unsure of his own feelings for his partner or what to think about other men or women hitting on him. The two experience various misadventures and awkward moments as they try to sort out their relationship and feelings, while still keeping up with their jobs and normal lives.

Other noteworthy characters include: Bikky and Carol, two children who have lost their families and are taken in by Ryo, and subsequently Dee; JJ and Drake, fellow detectives from the 27th; and Commissioner Berkeley Rose. A few of the acts focus on the young love that develops between Bikky and Carol. JJ harbours an obsession with Dee and becomes quite jealous of Ryo, but moves his attentions to Drake towards the end of the series. Berkeley is also attracted to Ryo and does not try to hide it, going so far as to steal a kiss from the latter whenever possible, much to the irritation of both Dee and Ryo.

== Characters ==
Dee Laytner (ディー・レイトナー, Dī Reitonā)
Voiced by: Tomokazu Seki (Japanese); Lex Lang (English)
A dark-haired young American cop who dislikes trouble-makers, which is ironic, since he seems to be one himself. His personality can switch from boisterous and inappropriate to serious and calm instantly. Though moody at times, he cares very much for the people around him. He is in love with Ryo, but has dated women in the past; in Dee's own words, he has several types of women he likes, but Ryo is the only and perfect man for him to love (though he admits to being bisexual from the start which seems to have occurred sometime after his teen years and appears to have had sexual experiences with other men prior to meeting Ryo).
Dee may seem to be rude and intrusive, but he has a strict sense of honor that will not allow him to take advantage of anybody; however his parameters can often be well outside the norm. He claims to hate children but understands Bikky's motives well, often acting the part of the wicked uncle when Ryo tries to impose a bit of discipline upon the unruly boy. Dee is fiercely protective of both Carol and Bikky, and is well liked by the children who now live at the orphanage where he and his childhood friend Tommy grew up.
The surname "Laytner" is made up; the name of the cop who found him in an alleyway was Jess Latener. Seeing him as a father figure even after he was revealed to be less than perfect, Dee was proud to take a similar name to the strict Jess. Dee is searching for stability in his life. Dee claims at first to have been trying to get Ryo to lighten up by kissing him but falls in love with him.
Randy Maclean (ランディ・リョウ・マクレーン, Randi Makurīn)
Voiced by: Nobuo Tobita (Japanese); Terrence Stone (English)
Also known as Ryō, is a half-Japanese officer and Dee's partner. A shy and sensitive man, he lost both parents at the age of eighteen. While he seems to be a little "out of it", he is very mature and his attention comes into play when it counts. He takes in the young Bikky to live with him early on in the story, and of course, he needs every ounce of smarts to keep the boy out of trouble. Often, he tries to deflect Dee's advances, but to little effect.
Ryo is unsure of what he really wants, but seems to care a lot about his partner nonetheless. He is uncomfortable with being constantly called by his Japanese name since this implies a certain degree of intimacy, and he is a very private man. However as Dee imposes this name upon him others begin to adopt it, and gradually he is forced to be more open. Highly suggestible, Ryo ponders frequently over the advice given to him by others and at times he questions his own view of himself, which tends to make him depressed.
Ryo loves children and tries to surround himself with warmth and affection. He is very compassionate, cares little for money but saves conscientiously and likes flowers. He has a strong idea of how he wants things to be, but Dee tends to spoil these plans, with his casual attitude to tidiness and his confusing behavior. While Ryo comes across to those who don't know him as friendly and shy, at times the control he has over his actions is broken by Bikky or Dee, exposing a more violent side. This appears to upset him on occasion, and may be part of the reason that Dee makes him uneasy. At first Ryo is confused by Dee's advances and also why he lets him especially since he considers himself straight. He gradually warms to him, appearing jealous when other people kiss Dee. He eventually accepts who he is and how he feels about Dee.
Bikky (ビッキー, Bikkī)
Voiced by: Rica Matsumoto (Japanese); Mona Marshall (English)
Bikky is bi-racial, African American young boy with golden hair who is around 10 at the start of the series. Bikky generally behaves in front of Ryo, and treats him like a father. Bikky swiftly makes it known that he dislikes Dee, especially for the fact that Dee has his eye on Ryo. Fearing that Dee may hurt Ryo since he used to be an active womanizer, and being not used to homosexuality in his surroundings, Bikky swears to protect Ryo from Dee's advances, engaging in any tactics he can to keep them apart. However, as the story moves on, Bikky's respect for the man slowly increases, and while he still doesn't fully like Dee being with Ryo he decides to stop trying to break them up, settling for "loving to hate" Dee instead. He is not particularly intelligent, often falling asleep in class with even Ryo admitting Bikky would only make it to college through his athleticism. Nonetheless, he is shown to be street savvy, have good common sense and instincts when it comes to people, and does possess some talent in less than legal skills such as pickpocketing, poker, and stealing tires off of bikes (things Ryo reprimands him for). By Fake Second Season, he has shot up in height (growing up taller than Dee) and dating Carol though he moves to go to college he promises to come and visit often.
The alternative spelling of his name is Vikky, however like Carol's name in the OAV, they used a different spelling. When TOKYOPOP released the manga, Cal was changed back to Carol (see below), however they continued to use Bikky's translated name throughout the series.
It can be assumed that Ryo adopted Bikky as when he is introduced in volume one of the original manga Bikky's surname is Goldman, but in 'FAKE "Second Season"' he introduces himself as Bikky Maclean.
Carol (キャル, Kyaru)
Voiced by: Wakana Yamazaki (Japanese); Stevie Bloch (English)
Bikky's childhood friend around 13 years old. She states that she doesn't want to date anyone until she's eighteen, because that's when her father, who is currently in a police hospital, met her mother. She is not a stranger to crime—she hopes to collect enough money to pay her father's bail—but her pickpocketing puts her in a dangerous situation. Flirtatious at times, she repels unwanted advances strongly, letting potential suitors know exactly what she thinks of them. Carol has extremely high self-esteem and is unlikely to let anybody get the better of her without a fight. However, despite the age difference(she's three years older) by Fake Second Season she and Bikky are a strong couple, though she states she'll kill him should he ever try to cheat.
Carol's name has also been translated as Cal or Chal. Technically, all variations are correct, and although Carol seems the most likely spelling for a Western name, "Chal" has in fact been used on official merchandise. Unlike Bikky, she likes the idea of Dee and Ryo as a couple and tries to help them, clocking Bikky when he goes too far.
Jemmy J. Adams (ジェミー・J・アダムス, Jemī J. Adamusu)
Voiced by: Tetsuya Iwanaga (Japanese); Gary Gillet (English)
A former classmate of Dee's at the police academy, he is an expert marksman, second only to Ryo. He shows his serious side only rarely; his time is usually spent trying to get "Sex God" Dee to return his love. JJ truly believes that people are good. This is intrinsic to his worldview. He cares very strongly for those close to him, and holds a surprisingly pacifistic outlook considering his profession. JJ acts very childlike at times, and this causes his colleagues to dismiss him automatically. However he proves to be a very good listener, despite the fact that he doesn't usually appear to be taking things in. Later in the manga, he gives up on his pursuit of Dee and accepts Ryo being with him; few days after that, he steals a kiss from his partner Drake Parker and asks him out for a date.
Berkeley Rose (バークレー・ローズ, Bākurē Rōzu)
Voiced by: Masashi Ebara (Japanese); Steve Kramer (English)
Berkeley first encountered Ryo and Dee while the two were on holiday in the Lake District. Dee took an instant dislike to the man, and the feeling seemed to be mutual. Initially Berkeley seemed to be rumored straight; however it later becomes apparent that much of Berkeley's hostility towards Dee stems from jealousy- he is desperately attracted to Ryo. Dee eventually begins to take notice of this, viewing Berkeley as a genuine threat rather than an object of mockery.
Berkeley is remarkably similar to Dee in many aspects, but comes across as a colder, more distant man in the surface. He treats police work with a similar distance, letting slip comments that show he views the investigation of the English murders as something of a game. His gaze is extremely penetrating -- Ryo doesn't like meeting his eyes. He is not afraid of abusing his position as Commissioner to get closer to what he wants. While he seems focused, Berkeley may be concentrating too hard on one thing while letting other opportunities slip away. Diana is in love with him, but Berkeley rejects her fearing his own emotions until the very end.
Diana Spacey (ダイアナ・スペーシー, Daiana Supēshī)
An outgoing and flamboyant FBI agent, Diana enjoys sparring with Dee. As a relentless flirt who constantly violates the dress code, she is not afraid to use her sexuality as a weapon, and Bikky is in awe of her. A martial arts practitioner, Diana is fully able to defend herself in potentially dangerous situations. However, for all her brashness, Diana is truly in love with Berkeley, who treats her as more of a sister figure. She is willing to do anything to wake Berkeley up to the fact that she has desires too, and finally gets him to declare his love for her.
Drake Parker (ドレイク・パーカー, Doreiku Pākā)
JJ's partner. A perpetual loser. Forever dumped by his girlfriends, Drake seems to be the most slobbish man in the NYPD 27th. A cheapskate, slacker and hopeless at getting up in the mornings, Drake needs to settle down with someone who cares about him enough to fix his many problems. In the manga story "Like Like Love", JJ confesses to him that he's stopped pursuing Dee, and after Drake comforts him JJ kisses him and says they should have a date to fix their love lives.
Ted (テッド, Teddo)
Almost nothing is known about Ted, but as the fifth regular investigator in Ryo and Dee's office, he deserves a mention. Like Drake, he shows little respect towards the Chief. Ted is notable for having surprised fans of the black and white manga when he made a brief appearance at the end of the OVA with flaming red hair.
Warren Smith (ウォーレン・スミス, Uōren Sumisu)
The Chief of Police at the NYPD's 27th precinct. The badger analogies are frequent; retribution violent. While most of the NYPD show him little respect on a daily basis, Ryo in particular holds him in high esteem, and sees him as something of a father figure to the young men under his command, a fact which the others may or may not acknowledge. He seems gruff and flustered at the best of times, and rarely gives in under pressure unless he believes the matter to be trivial. In Act 11, a flashback reveals that his first name is Warren.
Rai (ライ)
A crossover character from another of Matoh Sanami's works Ra-i. While he has a short temper and initially doesn't get along with Bikky, the two soon become great friends. He is Asian and comes from a wealthy family with an older brother (who owns a large company and specializes in knife throwing) and an older married sister. He has a friendly rivalry with Bikky and loves Lass, whom he is protective of. He has telekinetic powers that allow him to float in mid air though he tries hard to hide it (despite the fact many have seen his abilities firsthand). Like Bikky, he is brash, aggressive, has a short temper but is kind hearted and will protect people from harm, especially those close to him.
Lass (ラス, Rasu)
A crossover character from another of Matoh Sanami' works Ra-i. Unlike with Bikky and Rai, she gets along quite well with Carol upon first meeting and treat each other like sisters. She has telepathic powers that allow her to see visions like when she correctly figures out where Rai is after he is kidnapped, though tries to hide them (only Rai is fully aware). She is in love with Rai and is polite, calm, friendly, shy, and sweet.
Jim Campbell (ジム・キャンベル, Jimu Kyanberu)
A forensics expert who wears glasses and has good observational skills, managing to notice Dee's feelings for Ryo upon first meeting them and also warning Dee that people like Ryo who look nice and quiet on the outside are actually turbulent on the inside.
Kai (カイ)
The new chief of SCIU who looks over the main characters as their new boss after they move out of the 27th precinct. He had a son who was murdered by a female serial killer who murdered children because she hated their disobedient personalities, which came from her own hatred towards her own children whom she abused for misbehaving.

== Anime ==
Fake was adapted into a one-hour OVA based on volume two of the manga.

The Japanese voice actor cast is notable, with such famous names as Tomokazu Seki playing Dee, Nobuo Tobita playing Ryo, and Rica Matsumoto both playing Bikky and singing the closing theme, "Starlight Heaven".

It has aired in the U.S. on Logo as part of an anthology series dedicated to LGBT-themed animation and geek culture called Alien Boot Camp. It premiere in two parts, the first half on November 9, 2007, and the second a week later on November 16, 2007.

Dee and Ryo are on vacation at an English hotel by a lake. Ryo is hoping to get some peace and relaxation; Dee is hoping to get some quality time with Ryo. However, things take a bad turn when a dead body is found floating in the lake. Dee and Ryo don't want to do police work when they're on vacation, but it's hard to avoid it when a case falls in your lap.

They meet two other guests, Arisa and Cindy. Arisa and Ryo bond over the fact that they're both of Japanese descent while Arisa also bonds with Dee over Dee's unrequited love, as Arisa herself had waited six years for the man she loves to propose. After a pleasant day together, strange sounds are heard in the darkness of the hotel lobby. Investigating, Ryo and Dee meet Berkeley Rose, a New York cop who has decided to investigate the murder as "a fun way to kill time".

From that point on relaxation becomes impossible as surprise guests come pouring in—first Bikky and Carol, then JJ. In a town nearby, Berkeley figures out who the murderers are, and why they kill any Japanese who cross their path. Problem is, Dee just left Ryo back at the hotel with the killer, and JJ let it slip that Ryo is half-Japanese!

Back at the mansion, Ryo, the detective and Carol, the pick pocket girl has been drugged. There, the mansion's owner, Leonard Henry, reveals the reason he has trapped, tortured and killed Japanese persons like Arisa, and anyone unfortunate enough to witness it, like Cindy, is because the very first guests of the countryside mansion, who happened to be Japanese raped and killed his daughter, Maria-Elizabeth 5 years ago, who was 13 years old at the time of her death. After this horrible incident, in a discriminatory rage, Leonard has killed many people of Japanese descent to avenge his late daughter. He even killed the accomplice cook, whom he adopted a long time ago.

Dee comes just at the nick of time, with a motorcycle to save his romantic partner and hands him to the police. Before going to the slammer, his one request of burning anything related to his daughter, including the giant portrait, in Leonard's personal office is honored.

Back at the station, Ryo and Dee see that their commissioner has been replaced with the NY cop they met at the mansion, Berkeley Rose.

== Release ==
=== Volume list ===
==== Fake ====
No.	Original release date	Original ISBN	North American release date	North American ISBN
01	September 10, 1994	4-88271-261-X	May 6, 2003	978-1-59182-326-1
02	October 9, 1995	4-88271-337-3	July 8, 2003	978-1-59182-327-8
03	August 10, 1996	4-88271-483-3	September 9, 2003	978-1-59182-328-5
04	December 24, 1996	4-88271-573-2	November 4, 2003	978-1-59182-329-2
05	March 18, 1998	4-88271-770-0	January 13, 2004	978-1-59182-330-8
06	April 10, 1999	4-88271-960-6	March 9, 2004	978-1-59182-331-5
07	August 10, 2000	4-8352-1087-5	May 4, 2004	978-1-59182-332-2

== Reception ==
The OVA has been called "funny" because of its take on the common joke of "the homosexuality in the cop buddy" formula.
