= Burn up =

Burn up or Burn Up may refer to:

- Burnup, a measure of the neutron irradiation of the fuel in nuclear power technology
- Burn-Up!, a 1991 original video animation with several spinoffs:
  1. Burn-Up W, a 4-part OVA series from 1996
  2. Burn-Up Excess, a 13-part TV series from 1997 to 1998
  3. Burn-Up Scramble, a 12-part TV series from 2004
- Burn Up (TV series), a 2008 British/Canadian two-part drama serial

Burnup may also refer to:

- Cuthbert Burnup, English amateur cricketer and footballer, born 1975
