= Yumiko Shibata =

Japanese voice actress

- 柴田 由美子
- Born: 21 November 1964 (age 61); Tokyo, Japan
- Occupation: Voice actress
- Years active: 1984–2005
- Agent: 81 Produce

Yumiko Shibata (柴田 由美子, Shibata Yumiko; born November 21, 1964 in Tokyo) is a former Japanese voice actress previously associated with the talent management firm 81 Produce. She has voiced in a number of anime shows and video games, most notably as Maki in the Burn Up! anime series and Kan Kumanoff in Maple Town.

== Filmography ==
=== Anime ===
List of voice performances in anime
Year	Title	Role	Notes	Source
1984	Adventures of the Little Koala	Nick Penguin		
1985	The Three-Eyed One	Schoolgirl		
1985	GeGeGe no Kitaro	Wakasugi-sensei, Kitaro's mom	3rd TV series	
1985–87	High School! Kimengumi	Ran Wakato		
1986–87	Maple Town series	Kan Kumaoff		
1986–89	Saint Seiya	Mimiko, Shunrei		
1986	Twinkle Heart ja:トゥインクルハート 銀河系までとどかない	Cherry		
1987	Tales of Little Women	Jenny Snow		
1987	Transformers: The Headmasters	Baby Monkey		
1987	Bikkuriman	Kamejo, Nobori Goten		
1988	Sakigake!! Otokojuku	Yōko		
1988–89	Mashin Hero Wataru	EX Man, Wataru's mother		
1989	Babar the Elephant ぞうのババール	Pom		
1990	Super Real Mahjong: Battle Scramble 麻雀バトルスクランブル	Kasumi Serizawa	OVA	
1991	Burn Up!	Maki		
1993	Kyōryū wakusei ja:恐竜惑星	Misa (Moe) 美沙（萌）		
1993	Moldiver	Elizabeth		
1995	Mojacko	Veterinarian		
1996	Burn Up W	Maki		

=== Film ===
List of voice performances in film
Year	Title	Role	Notes	Source
1985	Seigi Choujin vs. Ancient Choujin	Kindergartener		
1985	Hour of Triumph! Justice Superman	Chambermaid		
1986	The Humanoid ザ・ヒューマノイド	Sherry		
1987	Saint Seiya: The Movie	Mimiko		
1988	Saint Seiya: The Legend of Crimson Youth	Shunrei		

=== Video games ===
List of voice performances in video games
Year	Title	Role	Notes	Source
1991	Cyber City Oedo 808: Attribute of the Beast	Risa, Saori Fuwa	PC Engine	
1997–98	Puchi Carat	Aqua Berylmarine, C-Mond, Sapphire Corandum	Arcade and console platforms	
2005	Saint Seiya: The Sanctuary	Shunrei	PS1/PS2	
