= Maya Okamoto =

Japanese actress (born 1967)

- 岡本 麻弥
- Born: February 3, 1967 (age 59); Shinjuku, Tokyo, Japan
- Occupations: Actress; singer; voice actress
- Years active: 1985–present
- Website: maya-okamoto.com

Maya Okamoto (岡本 麻弥, Okamoto Maya; born February 3, 1967) is a Japanese actress, voice actress,, and singer from Tokyo, Japan.

== Filmography ==
=== Television animation ===
- Mobile Suit Zeta Gundam (1985), Emma Sheen
- Touch (1985), Natsuko
- Mobile Suit Gundam ZZ (1986), Leina Ashta
- Uchūsen Sagittarius (1986), Professor Anne
- The Bush Baby (1992), Jacqueline Rhodes
- The Irresponsible Captain Tylor (1993), Nurse Harumi
- Blue Seed (1994), Yayoi
- Lupin III: The Pursuit of Harimao's Treasure (1995), Diana
- Wedding Peach (1995), Natsumi
- Virtua Fighter (1995–1996), Sarah Bryant
- Magical Project S (1996), Ramia
- Martian Successor Nadesico (1996), Haruka Minato
- B't X (1996), B't Mirage
- Burn Up! Excess (1997), Maya
- Saber Marionette (1997), Marine
- Saber Marionette J Again (1997), Marine
- Grander Musashi (1998), Sayaka Shirase
- Silent Möbius (1998), Saiko Yuki
- Sakura Wars (2000), Soletta Orihime
- Hataraki Man (2006), Masami Araki
- D.Gray-man (2007), Eliade
- Gintama (2007), Ane
- The Wallflower (2007), Ranmaru's mother
- Major 4th Season (2008), Jessica
- Nabari no Ou (2008), Asahi Rokujō
- Monochrome Factor (2008), Haru's mother
- Viper's Creed (2009), Maya
- Heaven's Lost Property (2009), Harpy 2

=== OVA ===
- Kōryū Densetsu Villgust (1992) (Fanna)
- Idol Defense Force Hummingbird (1993) (Reiko Hosokawa)
- Magical Girl Pretty Sammy (1995) (Ramia)
- Burn-Up W (1996) (Maya)
- VS Knight Ramune & 40 Fresh (1997) (Tequila)
- Manami & Nami Sprite (1997) (Chiaki Ogata)

=== Theatrical animation ===
- Maple Town (1986) (Patty)
- Silent Möbius (1991) (Saiko Yuki)
- Silent Möbius 2 (1992) (Saiko Yuki)
- Darkside Blues (1994) (Cellia)
- Night Warriors: Darkstalkers' Revenge (1997) (Mei-Ling (Lin-Lin))
- Mobile Suit Zeta Gundam: A New Translation - Heirs to the Stars (2005) (Emma Sheen)
- Mobile Suit Zeta Gundam: A New Translation II - Lovers (2005) (Emma Sheen)
- Mobile Suit Zeta Gundam: A New Translation III - Love is the Pulse of the Stars (2006) (Emma Sheen)

=== Video games ===
- Ordyne (1988) (Miyuki)
- Xak: The Art of Visual Stage (1989) (Freya "Fray" Jerbain)
- Xak II: Rising of the Redmoon (1990) (Freya "Fray" Jerbain)
- Xak III: The Eternal Recurrence (1994) (Freya "Fray" Jerbain)
- Serial Experiments Lain (1998) (Yonera Touko)
- Thousand Arms (1998) (Wyna Grapple)
- Assassin's Creed II (2009) (Japanese dub (Paola))

=== Dubbing ===
==== Live-action ====
- Maggie Cheung
  - Police Story (1995 TV Asashi edition) (May)
  - The Heroic Trio (Chat/Thief Catcher)
  - Twin Dragons (1996 TV Asashi edition) (Barbara)
  - Executioners (Chat/Thief Catcher/Chelsea)
  - Green Snake (Green Snake)
- Julie Delpy
  - Before Sunrise (Céline)
  - An American Werewolf in Paris (Sérafine Pigot McDermott)
  - Before Sunset (Céline)
  - Before Midnight (Céline)
- Addicted to Love (Maggie (Meg Ryan))
- ALF (Lynn Tanner (Andrea Elson))
- Anaconda (Denise Kalberg (Kari Wührer))
- Bad Girls (Lily Laronette (Drew Barrymore))
- Batman & Robin (Barbara Wilson/Batgirl (Alicia Silverstone))
- Bewitched (Isabel Bigelow / Samantha Stephens (Nicole Kidman))
- Breaking and Entering (Oana (Vera Farmiga))
- Bull Durham (1991 TV Asashi edition) (Millie (Jenny Robertson))
- Bullitt (2015 Wowow edition) (Cathy (Jacqueline Bisset))
- Cat People (1992 TV Asahi edition) (Irena Gallier (Nastassja Kinski))
- Chances Are (Miranda Jeffries (Mary Stuart Masterson))
- Commando (Jenny Matrix (Alyssa Milano))
- The Craft (Sarah Bailey (Robin Tunney))
- The Crucible (Abigail Williams (Winona Ryder))
- Cube 2: Hypercube (Julia Sewell (Lindsey Connell))
- Death Proof (Pam (Rose McGowan))
- D.E.B.S. (Lucy Diamond (Jordana Brewster))
- Demon Knight (Jeryline (Jada Pinkett))
- Dinner for Schmucks (Julie (Stéphanie Szostak))
- Emmanuelle (1996 TV Tokyo edition) (Emmanuelle (Sylvia Kristel))
- Evilspeak (1986 TBS edition) (Kelly (Kathy McCullen))
- Flatliners (1996 NTV edition) (Rachel Manus (Julia Roberts))
- Fragile (Helen Perez (Elena Anaya))
- Goal! (Roz Harmison (Anna Friel))
- The Goonies (1988 TBS edition) (Stephanie "Stef" Steinbrenner (Martha Plimpton))
- Happy Gilmore (Virginia Venit (Julie Bowen))
- Hollow Man 2 (Dr. Maggie Dalton (Laura Regan))
- Identity (2007 TV Tokyo edition) (Paris Nevada (Amanda Peet))
- Last Days (Asia (Asia Argento))
- Lost Girl (Dr. Lauren Lewis (Zoie Palmer))
- Mr. Mercedes (Janey Patterson (Mary-Louise Parker))
- The New Adventures of Pippi Longstocking (Pippi Longstocking (Tami Erin))
- Noelle (Mrs. Kringle (Julie Hagerty))
- The People vs. Larry Flynt (Althea Leasure (Courtney Love))
- Planet Terror (Cherry Darling (Rose McGowan))
- Pushing Daisies (Charlotte "Chuck" Charles (Anna Friel))
- Red Dawn (Erica Mason (Lea Thompson))
- Resident Evil: Apocalypse (Jill Valentine (Sienna Guillory))
- Resident Evil: Retribution (Ada Wong (Li Bingbing))
- River Queen (Sarah O'Brien (Samantha Morton))
- Sabrina (Sabrina Fairchild (Julia Ormond))
- Silent Trigger (Clegg "Spotter" (Gina Bellman))
- Single White Female (Hedra "Hedy" Carlson / Ellen Besch (Jennifer Jason Leigh))
- The Sorcerer and the White Snake (Ice Harpy (Vivian Hsu))
- Super Mario Bros. (1994 NTV edition) (Daisy (Samantha Mathis))
- Turistas (Pru (Melissa George))
- Wild Things (Suzie Toller (Neve Campbell))
