= Burn-Up Excess =

1997 action comedy anime television series

- Cover of Burn Up Excess Volume 1 DVD
- Genre: Action; Comedy; Police
- Created by: Yasunori Ide; Jun Kanzaki; AIC
- Anime television series
- Directed by: Shinichiro Kimura
- Produced by: Kinya Watanabe; Takeshi Akabane; Yoshiyuki Matsuzaki
- Written by: Kazumi Koide
- Music by: Kouichi Namiki; Shinobu Uchida
- Studio: Magic Bus
- Licensed by: AUS: Madman Entertainment; NA: ADV Films
- Original network: DirecTV Japan
- Original run: December 12, 1997 – July 1, 1998
- Episodes: 13
- icon

Burn-Up Excess is a 1997 action comedy anime television series based on Burn-Up! OVA franchise by AIC. This series was directed by Shinichiro Kimura and animated by Magic Bus. It aired from 1997 to 1998 for a total of 13 episodes, exclusively through DirecTV. Four volumes were released on VHS and DVD in North America by ADV Films.

The series is a tongue-in-cheek look at a special operations unit in the Tokyo police force called "Team Warrior", with large amounts of fan service thrown in for good measure, exemplified by the inclusion of ADV's trademarked "Jiggle Counter" on the DVDs along with Plastic Little.

== Plot summary ==
The story revolves around Rio Kinezono, a buxom member of Team Warrior who consistently overspends her paycheck, but is also a top-flight martial artist and a valuable member of the team. In the field, Rio is usually flanked by Maya Jingu, the green-haired team sniper who appears to have a serious lust for ranged weapons (specifically assault rifles). Their antics are backed up by the inventions of Nanvel Candlestick, the exotic team engineer whose job is to devise and implement special combat and surveillance hardware for the team's use. Lilica Ebett, the sprightly pink-haired girl who's a computer expert, can pretty much crack into any information system, and Yuji Naruo, a perverted, camera-toting voyeur, always serves as Warrior's drop-operation pilot and driver. Maki Kawasaki, the mysterious, bespectacled superintendent, is charged with commanding Warrior in the field and administering their various missions as they arise.

The series chronicles the team members' adventures as they slowly track down a sinister city plot involving the manufacture and distribution of military armaments.

It was preceded by the AIC's OVA miniseries Burn-Up W, although there are some inconsistencies with several elements, the most notable of which is the malevolent and calculating Ruby, who seems to be a completely different character altogether in Burn-Up Excess, despite the two anime being considered canon.

== Characters ==
=== Main characters ===
==== Team Warrior ====
Rio Kinezono
Voiced by: Yuka Imai (Japanese); Amanda Winn Lee (English)
This busty blonde is the main protagonist of the series. She's trained in martial arts and is always the person leading an attack. She likes to look good and loves buying pretty things. Unfortunately, her spending habits keep her in eternal debt, so she's always looking for good-paying jobs to support her lifestyle. She has a desk job working for the police in Policetown and counts on work with Team Warrior to pay her bills. Always trying to find the easy way out, she tries to hook up with any rich guy she can find in the hopes that he'll be able to buy her all the pretty things she desires.

Maki Kawazaki
Voiced by: Mami Kingetsu (Japanese); Beth Wernick (English)
Team Warrior's commander and a no-nonsense type of leader. She was awarded the command to distract her from her investigation into Black Diamonds. She married fellow investigator Masato who was killed in an explosion on a boat on their wedding day.

Lilica Ebett
Voiced by: Sakura Tange (Japanese); Kimberly Yates (English)
The computer expert of the group, with pink hair done up in bows. Lilica is usually seen in a control room and has the ability to hack into computer systems and provide intelligence support to the rest of the group.

Maya Jingu
Voiced by: Maya Okamoto (Japanese); Lani Minella (English)
Maya loves her guns and treats them like her men. She has green hair and is almost always seen wearing a headband.

Nanvel Candlestick
Voiced by: Yuri Amano (Japanese); Allison Keith (English)
Team Warrior's resident engineering wizard. She is the one responsible for creating a lot of the high-tech gadgets the team uses. She has a bad habit of coloring her creations either purple or pink.

Yuji Naruo
Voiced by: Ryotaro Okiayu (Japanese); Jason Lee (English)
Yuji is the only male in the group and the team's vehicle expert. He has a crush on Rio, much to her chagrin. He is a lover of female legs and undergarments and a great example of a hentai (pervert). He has a bad habit of showing up in the girls' locker room while they're either changing or taking a shower.

Rio's boss
Rio's boss is always pushing Rio to finish her work. She tries to use her charms on him to let her off the hook.

==== Neo Tokyo Police ====
Miyuki
Miyuki is Rio's friend from the police academy. She works as a traffic cop.

Miyuki's boss
Just like Rio, Miyuki is constantly in trouble with her boss.

=== Other characters ===
==== Osaka ====
Jingu Syndicate
A crime syndicate in Osaka run by Maya's father.

Maya's father
The boss of the Jingu crime syndicate in Osaka.

Bob
The redheaded member of the Jingu crime syndicate in Osaka.

Ken
A chubby guy who wears glasses and is a member of the Jingu crime syndicate in Osaka.

Tommy
A member of the Jingu crime syndicate in Osaka.

Yamada
A tall guy who wears glasses and is a member of the Jingu crime syndicate in Osaka.

Gondo Construction
An aggressive company bent on land development in Osaka and eliminating the Jingu crime syndicate.

==== Neo Tokyo ====
Ramen shop owners
The couple that owns the ramen shop next to Police Town. They have two children, a boy and a girl.

Chi Mama
The leader of a group of cross-dressing thieves and owner of a nightclub. He generally refers to Rio by a pet name of "Stephanie".

Underwear thief
A masked thief who travels around Tokyo, stealing women's underwear, but he is actually a cram school student.

Prince Hasan
The heir to a powerful oil company in the Middle East, he arrives in Tokyo and requests protection from the Warriors. Rio hoped to marry him and get him to pay off her debts until she found out that he is a pervert.

Thunderstorm
A group that wants to kill Prince Hasan to cause disorder in the Middle East.

Henry
An advanced strategic tank with artificial intelligence and multiple forms of advanced weaponry, from standard machine guns to a large pulse cannon capable of destroying an entire division of standard tanks in seconds. One of Team Warrior's missions is to escort Henry from Japan to Switzerland.

==== Antagonists ====
Ruby
Ruby is the woman that coordinates much of the criminal activity against which Team Warrior fights. It is apparent that she has a considerable amount of funding for her criminal operations. She visits Tokyo to host a fashion show disguised as designer Miriam Bardo. She is also very adept in hand-to-hand combat.

Harry
Ruby's boss and with scars on his hand and face. He was the husband of Maki whose hand was scarred when he saved her from a crazed gunman. He was supposedly killed in an explosion on a boat on their wedding day. He survived and turned to crime and the underworld, becoming an international arms dealer.

Drone bugs
Used by the Ruby and the Dawn Mirage to take over Neo Tokyo Tower.

Shiguru Tomoyama
Former prime minister of Japan who becomes involved with the production of mechanized police and military personnel.

Mecha Cops
The Mecha Cops are robotic police manufactured by the Sukurada factory under the control of the former prime minister Shiguru Tonoyama and sold to the Neo Tokyo police. They have advanced artificial intelligence with black diamond CPUs, and are impervious to most normal weaponry. They are designed to subdue criminals using non-lethal force. They have many other features, including the ability to run faster than speeding cars and interface directly with computer systems in Police Town for quick data retrieval.

=== Nanvel's inventions ===
As the group's electronics expert, Nanvel's job is to design and build machines to help the team achieve its goals.

Pin-Ele
Pin-Ele is a giant pink elephant that Nanvel advertises as an Optical Diet Machine. It is able to project a hologram over someone to make that person look slimmer. People who want to change their looks wear receptors shaped like flowers on their heads and Pin-Ele transmits the new images to those receptors which are then projected over their wearers. During the series, she builds three versions of the machine, each smaller than the last. The final version is so small that it can be carried around by one person.

Pink Cockroach
A pink device the size and shape of a cockroach, designed to sneak into inaccessible locations and transmit audio and video back to the team. It can also be used as a communications device. Nanvel also states that if the cockroach's wings are opened, it can be used as a hand grenade although this function is never demonstrated.

Pink Rabbit
This is a giant pink robot shaped like a rabbit. Nanvel rides in a large glass bubble that makes the rabbit's head. It doesn't have any weapons, but it has heavy armor and is able to punch, kick, and shoot its hands off like pop guns. She uses the rabbit to help fight the super androids in the last episode.

== Episode list ==
Episodes 8 to 12 contain short segments at the end of each episode called "Yuji's Additional Theater", mainly focusing on Yuji's attempts to film the female characters in their underwear.

No.	Title	Original release date
1	"Warrior Team Deploys"; Transliteration: "WARRIOR shutsudou" (Japanese: WARRIOR出動)	December 12, 1997
Rio eats in a ramen shop next door to Police Town because it's the only place she can afford. Suddenly, the Neo Neo Tokyo Tower just down the street is attacked by a swarm of robotic insects and the Dawn Mirage terrorist group takes its occupants hostage. Team Warrior is summoned to rescue them. Maya fires an EMP grenade that disables the drones and Rio goes into action, disabling the terrorists and freeing the hostages. However, the mastermind, Ruby, is pretending to be a hostage and is controlling the terrorist attack which is a cover to infiltrate and embed a Code Scrambler in the tower's control system.
2	"Undies, Go!"; Transliteration: "Shitagi de GO!" (Japanese: 下着でGO!)	TBA
Neo Tokyo is undergoing a series of jewelry thefts. Meanwhile, Rio is in need of money to pay her debts, but Team Warrior is assigned to a low paying job tracking down a women's underwear thief. However, Rio, the thief and leg fetishist Yuji stumble upon clues to the mastermind behind the jewelry thefts after they encounter the cross-dressing Chimama gang in a bar. Although Rio and Team Warrior crack the case, the costs she incurred in the process wiped out any possible bonus, so Rio still has to get a part-time job to pay her debts.
3	"From the Desert With Love!"; Transliteration: "Sabaku yori ai wo komete" (Japanese: 砂漠より愛をこめて)	TBA
Middle Eastern Prince Hasan visits Neo Tokyo and needs protection. A group called Thunderstorm is planning to kill the prince and cause chaos in his country. Rio's excited about the job because she hopes that she can marry him for his money and pay off her debts. Secretly, she takes him to a favorite spot of hers, Gasoline Town, where thieves and miscreants rule. While enjoying their time alone, they are captured and taken aboard a booby-trapped tanker. As the situation become more dire, Rio sees the opportunities for a big bonus escalating and she manages to get the prince to safety. As a reward, he offers her a piece of desert which she declines, only to find out later that it was rich in oil reserves.
4	"Rogue Father"; Transliteration: "Gokudō Fāzā" (Japanese: 極道ファーザー)	TBA
Maya travels to Osaka to visit her sick father, the boss of the Jingu crime syndicate. When she arrives, she finds the Gondo construction company is trying to take over the area including the family home. Team Warrior investigations reveal that Gondo is also involved in illegal arms dealing, and the Jingu group infiltrate an arms auction aboard an airship. When Maya gets her hands on the weapons, she lets loose, bringing down the airship, leading to the arrest of the Gondo group and the captain. Unfortunately, the mastermind, Ruby escapes.
5	"An Idol Never Sleeps!"; Transliteration: "Aidoru wa nemurenai…" (Japanese: アイドルは眠れない…)	TBA
Rio is given the mission of protecting pop star Anna Katagowa from a stalker, while Ruby must attend a conference to sell data on a Super Stealth Missile and other weapons. However, Ruby's special pen with the data stored in Liquid Memory Particles is accidentally switched when Ruby bumps into Anna, but Maki realizes its importance. Meanwhile, Rio takes Anna to Gasoline Town where they get drunk together. Days later, Ruby attacks Anna to retrieve the pen but is intercepted by Rio, meanwhile Anna is attacked by the stalker who turns out to be her building caretaker. Because Ruby eventually escaped with the pen, Team Warrior gets no reward although Anna decides to follow Rio's advice to do what she really wants and becomes an Enka singer.
6	"Rambo Bravo! Rio Bimbo!"; Transliteration: "Ranbo! Buraboo! Rio binboo!" (Japanese: ランボ! ブラボ―! 利緒ビンボ―!)	TBA
In a flashback to Rio's days before joining Team Warrior, Maki first meets Rio working behind the counter in a convenience store to earn extra money for her debts. Maki witnesses her fighting skills as Rio takes down a thief who's trying to rob the store. After putting Rio through some tests, Maki asks her to join Team Warrior, but Rio refuses. However, after Rio rescues her fellow officer Miyuki in a hostage situation, the reward money convinces her that Team Warrior is the place for her.
7	"Short Vacation"; Transliteration: "Shooto Bakeeshon" (Japanese: ショ―ト・バケ―ション)	TBA
Maki goes to the airport preparing to take off on her annual vacation, visiting the site where her husband Masato died in a shipboard explosion on their wedding day. While she is gone, Miyuki discovers possible evidence of a murder in the bathroom, Lilica finds evidence of a hacker who's been in the police's computer system erasing data and officers throughout Police Town discover that many of their personal possessions are missing. As well, an old lady pesters the police to find her missing boy Takuya or "Tah". Rio begins an investigation into the recent events, deducing that there is a single culprit within the Police Department. However, the Police Profiler Masuoka, says that Rio is the guilty one and she is arrested. Continuing their investigation, the Team Warrior finally trap the culprit: the old lady's pet crow Tah.
8	"Nanvel Kidnapped!"; Transliteration: "Nanberu Yūkai Jiken" (Japanese: ナンベル誘拐事件)	TBA
Nanvel wins the prize for Inventor of the Year for her Optical Diet Machine Pin-Ele which can change a person’s appearance. Walking home from a celebratory dinner, she and Rio are kidnapped by the Chimama gang and Nanvel is forced to construct a version of her illusion machine to make them invisible so they can carry out bank robberies. They dump Rio because of the cost of feeding her huge appetite. Rio then helps Team Warrior trace the criminals by their exotic food purchases to please Nanvel. Team Warrior catches them in the act of robbing a bank using the device and Maki forces Nanvel to destroy Pin-Ele. The episode ends with a fake TV test card onscreen.
9	"Slam Tank Part 1"; Transliteration: "Suramu Tanku (zenpen)" (Japanese: スラム・タンク（前編）)	TBA
Rio is given the task of guarding Henry, a United Nations VIP which turns out, to her disappointment, to be a high tech tank rather than a handsome man. Their transport airplane is hijacked by the pilots who are working for Ruby and crashes in the Desanian desert, where Rio and the tank are the only survivors. The Desanian leader sends a division of tanks in pursuit, but Henry destroys them when they attempt to capture it. Lilica and Nanvel hack into a Desanian satellite and manage to trace Rio and Henry's location.
10	"Slam Tank Part 2"; Transliteration: "Suramu Tanku (kōhen)" (Japanese: スラム・タンク（後編）)	TBA
Rio and Henry the tank are stranded in the Desanian desert and must find their way to the border while evading capture. Rio eventually establishes a rapport with Henry, but they are captured by Ruby and the Desanian leader who try to analyse the tank, but are unable to understand how it operates. Rio realizes she must to activate the self-destruct instruction to destroy Henry but she cannot do it. When the Desanian troops are about to eliminate Rio as being of no further use, a satellite beam activates Henry, and the tank goes on the attack, defeating the Desanian forces but being badly damaged in the process. Rio and Henry limp to the border and are picked up by Team Warrior and returned to Japan where they discover Henry’s intelligence is stored in the satellite. Rio promptly spends the reward money on fashion items.
11	"Watch Out for the Mecha Cop!"; Transliteration: "Mekakoppu ni goyoujin" (Japanese: メカコップに御用心)	TBA
To avoid being captured by the police, bank robbers raid a local pre-school and take hostages. As the police are try to handle the situation, a business man arrives and sends in a highly advanced android Mecha Cop who quickly subdues the criminals using non-lethal force. Over the next few days, the Mecha Cops show their many other skills and begin serving as policemen. However, Nanvel and the rest of Team Warrior are suspicions because the Mecha Cops seem to be too advanced to be real. Nanvel discovers they are each controlled by a black diamond, made from a thousand compressed diamonds. Maki links this discovery to a case that her fiancee Masato was working on when he was killed. Unexpectedly, the Mecha Cops begin to malfunction, but Team Warrior is able to defeat them and claim a large reward.
12	"Invitation from the Past"; Transliteration: "Kako kara no shoutaijou" (Japanese: 過去からの招待状)	TBA
Maki dresses the girls up in school uniforms and sends them on a field trip to the Sukurada factory which manufactures the Mecha Cops. They do not find much, but they do discover some important people are involved, including the former prime minister Shiguru Tonoyama. In a flashback, it is shown that Maki was offered the job to lead the Warrior team to remove her from the black diamond investigation. Miriam Bardo, a famous fashion designer arrives in Neo Tokyo to put on a fashion show and Maki recognizes the scar on her partner's had as the same as on her fiancé Masato, obtained when he saved her from a crazed gunman. The designer is really Ruby, who has smuggled black diamonds into Japan for Tonoyama. Meanwhile, Rio and Nanvel infiltrate the factory and discover the illegal manufacture of battle androids. Maki confronts her chief with the evidence, but he does nothing so she and Team Warrior take matters into their own hands. They become involved in a shoot-out with the battle androids, but when the Armored Riot Squad arrives, Team Warrior are accused of being terrorists as well and come under fire. Meanwhile Masato reveals himself to Maki as being the mastermind behind the diamond smuggling operation.
13	"The Last Stage of Goodbye"; Transliteration: "Ketsubetsu no Rasuto Suteeji" (Japanese: 訣別のラストステ―ジ)	July 1, 1998
At the completion of the fashion show, Miriam Bardo reveals a new type of advanced female battle android to the world. They open fire on the audience displaying amazing agility, speed and power and can even heal themselves during battle and easily defeat the Armored Riot Squad who goes to the rescue. Meanwhile, Masato tells Maki how he found that Tonoyama was behind boat explosion, and how he turned to crime and the underworld. He became an international arms dealer called Harry and has embedded his control program into the logic core of the Neo Tokyo Tower. Masato then kills Tonoyama and asks Maki to join him, but she refuses. Team Warrior manages to escape through the sewers and arrive at the noodle store. They then confront the police chief over his corruption, recording his confession. Team Warrior then goes to Neo Tokyo Tower where Maki tells them to destroy the logic core of the tower which controls the battle androids and they save the day. Later, a new police chief is appointed, looking a lot like Ruby.
