= Cartoon Network (Japan) =

- Current logo, as of October 1, 2011.
- Country: Japan
- Broadcast area: Japan
- Headquarters: Tokyo, Japan

Programming
- Languages: Japanese; English
- Picture format: 1080i HDTV

Ownership
- Owner: Discovery Japan (Skydance)

History
- Launched: September 1, 1997; 29 years ago

Links
- Website: www.discoveryjapan.jp/media/cartoonnetwork/

Cartoon Network (Japanese: カートゥーン ネットワーク, Hepburn: Kātūn Nettowāku) is a Japanese cable and satellite television channel operated by Discovery Japan, a subsidiary of Skydance. The channel is aimed at all ages, and mostly airs animated television series. As a Japanese version of the eponymous television channel in the United States. Cartoon Network broadcasts original series from its U.S. counterpart, as well as several Japanese animated series and films, and other non-Japanese programs.

== History ==
Turner Broadcasting System and its Japanese partner Itochu announced in June 1997 that they would launch a Japanese version of Cartoon Network on September 1st of that same year. The channel was going to be the first country-specific feed in Asia-Pacific and was set to hire local management and staff. It was also seen as a measure to counter Tokuma Shoten's investment in DirecTV Japan, as the channel was not carried on the platform.

By 2001, it had claimed more than two million subscribers.

In 2006, Cartoon Network Japan by means of its parent company Japan Entertainment Network had plans to develop television series specifically for the US market.

On October 1, 2011, Cartoon Network in Japan, along with other versions of Cartoon Network operated by Turner Broadcasting System Asia Pacific, adopted its current branding. On April 1, 2017, the channel started using graphics from Cartoon Network USA's Dimensional brand package. On January 1, 2022, the channel started using graphics from Cartoon Network USA's Redraw Your World brand package. On March 1, 2022, the Cartoonito block was launched for daily mornings.

Discovery Japan closed the channel's standalone website on September 10, 2024.
