= Burn-Up Scramble =

Japanese anime television series

- Burn-Up Scramble Volume 1 DVD cover
- Genre: Comedy, science fiction
- Created by: Yasunori Ide; Jun Kanzaki
- Anime television series
- Directed by: Hiroki Hayashi
- Written by: Sumio Uetake
- Music by: Kazuo Nobuta; Toshihiko Sahashi
- Studio: AIC Spirits
- Licensed by: AUS: Madman Entertainment; NA: Geneon
- Original network: AT-X
- Original run: January 12, 2004 – March 29, 2004
- Episodes: 12

Burn-Up Scramble is a 2004 12-episode anime television series directed by Hiroki Hayashi. Though the basic premise is in keeping with its predecessors (Burn Up!, Burn-Up W and Burn-Up Excess) it is an entirely new series with some new and some old characters, and a very different art style.

Like Burn-Up W and Burn-Up Excess, the series centers on a police officer and martial artist name Rio Kinezono, leader of the super-secret squad known as Warriors. She wants to find love in her life so much so that she often changes around her living arrangements just to attract the right man. So far, the only man she was able to attract is her superior, Yuji Naruo, and he's being protected by Matsuri Tamagawa, his girlfriend. Her Warriors teammates are Maya Jingu, a quiet girl, and Lilica Evett, a shy and insecure telepath.

In this series, Rio Kinezono is more interested in pursuing romance than fashion, as in the earlier series. Her martial arts abilities are enhanced, and she is even able to dodge bullets fired at her. The Maya Jingu character design has changed quite a bit; she has longer hair, shorter and less well-endowed. Lilica Evette is a shy, insecure, and slightly clumsy psychic rather than the cheerfully energetic computer and tech expert. Yuji Naruo is now the Head Chief rather than a fellow officer and driver, and continually makes inappropriate romantic overtures to Rio Kinezono instead of just being obsessed with seeing the girls in their underwear. The unnamed Commander is not involved in Warrior activities and has a more minor role than Maki, the commander in the earlier series.

== Plot ==
Set in AD. In 2023, the Tokyo government is concerned about the increase in major criminal organizations, terrorists, and other threats to the security of society. This leads to the formation of a special extralegal police team from within the Metro Police Section 8 Branch called Warrior. Under their Commander, the team combines the talents of martial arts expert Rio Kinezono and skilled marksman and gun expert Maya Jingu. They are joined later by the shy Lilica Evette, who uses her psychic powers to assist them in their crime-solving adventures. Later, the Police Council created obedient New Warriors to replace the original Warriors. These New Warriors are genetically modified humans with superhuman strength gained via drugs, and based on data obtained from monitoring Rio and Maya's missions.

== Characters ==
Although many of the characters in Burn Up Scramble share the same names as characters from Burn Up W and Burn Up Excess, they have undergone various changes in terms of art design, personality, and plot.

Rio Kinezono
Voiced by: Megumi Toyoguchi (Japanese); Julie Ann Taylor (English)
Rio is the volatile leader of the Warriors, blond and large-breasted. Rio is just as good at physical combat as her previous incarnation and is now able to dodge bullets. She is the character that most resembles her counterpart from W and Excess. She bears very similar character designs and personality traits, now she is more driven to seek a happy love life than her previous obsessions with fashion and spending in the earlier series.
Maya Jingu
Voiced by: Rie Kugimiya (Japanese); Sandy Fox (English)
Maya is an expert marksman but is more softly spoken and level-headed than in the earlier series. Visually, her character design has changed quite a bit; she now has long dark hair woven in a plait and is less well-endowed.
Lilica Evette
Voiced by: Mamiko Noto (Japanese); Kari Wahlgren (English)
Lilica is a shy, insecure, and slightly clumsy psychic, but when she gets drunk, she becomes more uninhibited and somewhat daffy. She looks up to Rio, addressing her with the honorific 'senpai'. Because of the possible danger her powers present, Lilica is outfitted with magnetic wrist and ankle restraints. Her character has changed the most from her previous version. The new Lilica is around the same height as Rio, has a figure to match, short orange hair, and a tanned complexion, while the previous Lilica was shorter, flat-chested, and sported pink hair.
Warriors Commander
Voiced by: Yuko Kagata (Japanese); Karen Strassman (English)
The unnamed Commander is the creator and commander of the Warriors. She answers to the Central Police Council, and gathers Rio, Maya and Lilica to form the Warriors and hands out their assignments.
Yuji Naruo
Voiced by: Hiroki Takahashi (Japanese); Dave Wittenberg (English)
Yuji holds the rank of Head Chief in the Metro Police Section 8 Branch. He is portrayed as a smart, well-educated officer from a wealthy family and obsessively pursues Rio romantically, even at work. In the previous series, he was a low-level perverted policeman. He still serves as comic relief in the series.
Matsuri Tamagawa
Voiced by: Rie Tanaka (Japanese); Wendee Lee (English)
Matsuri is Yuji's current girlfriend, and a police officer as well. While she is oblivious to Yuji's attentions to Rio, she perceives Rio as a threat to her marrying Yuji in the future. She is constantly threatening Rio to stay away from him, oblivious to the fact that Rio is not interested in Yuji.
New Warriors
The New Warriors are genetically modified women with superhuman strength gained via drugs, and their skills are based on data obtained by monitoring Rio and Maya's earlier missions. They were created in a collaboration between the Central Police Council and criminals, using illegal human experiments and funding.

== Episodes ==
No.	Title	Original release date
1	"Warriors Strike at Dawn!" "Uōriāzu Akatsuki ni Shutsugekisu" (ウォーリアーズ 暁に出撃す!!)	12 January 2004
On New Year's Eve, crime is getting out of hand with the Evil Frenzy motorcycle gang terrorising the city. Maya is abducted by some motorcycle gang members, but in a one-sided shootout, she has them all arrested. The Police Supreme Council decides to call in the Warriors to deal with the crisis, and Rio and Maya take on and defeat the entire gang themselves.
2	"Defeat the Mobile-Robber Madgunder!" "Taose!! Gōdatsu Sharyō "Maddokandā!!" (倒せ!! 強奪車両『マッドガンダー!!)	19 January 2004
Rio loses her money and has her bicycle destroyed during an ATM heist. After the case is assigned to the Warriors, she is more than happy to join Maya to bring the ATM thief to Justice.
3	"Warriors, Five Seconds 'Til Detonation!" "Uōriāzu Bakushi Gobyō Mae!!" (ウォーリアーズ 爆死五秒前!!)	26 January 2004
Rio and Maya are being called by the Commander to stop the Green Knights environmental terrorist group from blowing up the Bay City T-XO theme park. The bomb is set to go off at noon, and they don't have time to evacuate the people. The Commander assigns the slightly clumsy psychic, Lilica Evette, to the team, and with her assistance, Rio and Maya detect and destroy the bomb.
4	"Crash! Seventy Thousand Kilometers in Tokyo!" "Gekitotsu!! Dai Tōkyō 7-man kiromētoru" (激突!! 大東京7万km!!)	2 February 2004
A masked serial thief causes a public nuisance at night, and accidentally peeps into Rio's apartment while she is undressing. The Warriors are called in to catch the perpetrator. Lilica detects the thief's location, and Rio chases him across the city, tearing off pieces of his clothing in retaliation for him seeing her semi-naked earlier.
5	"Dust Explosion of Love and Sorrow!" "Ai to Kanashimi no Funjin Bakuha!!" (愛と哀しみの粉塵爆破!!)	9 February 2004
The Commander has Rio and Maya take Lilica out for the day to help develop her powers. The simple outing turns into an event-filled day, encountering would-be thieves in a local convenience store a number of times, drinking too much beer in Maya's apartment, and a drunken Lilica wandering outside at night wearing only an apron. The day finishes with an explosion destroying Maya's apartment, and Rio having to pay for the damage.
6	"Western Sapporo – A Hell at Shiretoko!" "Uesutan Sapporo～Shiretoko Jigokuhen～" (ウェスタン札幌 ～知床地獄篇～)	16 February 2004
Following their holidays, Rio drowns her sorrow in not finding love. Maya tells a story of how she visited her master, Hokkaido, a former bodyguard, bounty hunter, and mercenary, who rescued the young Maya from the battlefield and taught her to shoot. While there, Dill Bill, an old enemy, issued a warning and sent a group of mercenaries to kill him. Master and Maya defeated them, but Master was mortally wounded, and he asked her to kill him. She says she hunted down Dill and eliminated him and his men, but she then chides Rio and Lilica for taking the story seriously.
7	"Shot Down! Nightmare at Airport 2023" "Gekitsui Akumu no Eapōto 2023" (撃墜 悪夢のエアポート2023)	23 February 2004
Dressed as hostesses, Rio and Maya escort Princess Harnes of the Aman Kingdom to Japan on a civilian plane, except she blows their cover. A couple of anti-government agents, Rosan Graph and Monica Gree, try to abduct Harnes, but Rio and Maya, with Harnes' assistance, manage to foil their plot.
8	"Super Message from Deep Space!" "Daiginga kara no Chō Messēji" (大銀河からの超メッセージ)	1 March 2004
After a late night on the town in which Rio is repeatedly exploited by men trying to sell her things, she collapses back at her apartment. In the morning, Flying saucers appear over Tokyo and release robots that go rampaging through the city, taking control of people, including Yugi and the rest of the police force. Only the Warriors and the Commander seem unaffected. Maya and Lilica destroy many of the robots, but one saucer transforms into a giant robot. A gigantic Rio then appears, apparently enlarged by new police technology, and engages the robot in a titanic struggle. During the battle, her clothes are ripped, revealing her underwear, to her great embarrassment. However, later she wakes up and realizes it was just a dream.
9	"The Black Seajack! Crash Over the Ocean!" "Kuroi Shījakku!! Kaijō Daigekitotsu!!" (黒いシージャック!! 海上大激突!!)	8 March 2004
The Warriors are aboard an ocean cruise liner to catch drug syndicate target 19, A.K.A. Dragon Tail. Unfortunately, Yugi and Matsuri are also on the cruise, complicating matters. Rio encounters Agent 19, who romances her, rendering her ineffective. The rumored drug deal is actually a trap to eliminate the Warriors, and they face both Agent 19 and his young, female, drug-addicted, knife-wielding assassin. May and Rio defeat their opponents, but before he dies, 19 reveals that he was hired to assassinate the Warriors.
10	"Destruction of Great Tokyo! Farewell Warriors!" "Dai Tōkyō Zenmetsu!～Saraba Uōriāzu!!～" (大東京全滅! ～さらばウォーリアーズ!!～)	15 March 2004
Rio and Maya refuse the Commander's order to stop a bus hijacking because of the threat to the lives of the hostages, so the Commander sends in two New Warriors. The New Warriors kill the hijacker, but the hostages are also killed. They also seriously wound Rio and Maya, who try to stop them, and then blow up the bus and destroy all the evidence. The Police Chief, however, is satisfied with the result and plans to deploy more new Warriors. While Rio and Maya recover slowly in the hospital, Lilica is assigned to work with them, and although they solve cases, they also cause massive collateral damage. Meanwhile, Lilica gathers information about the New Warriors and how the police are working with the underworld to develop super-powered Warriors and sends it to Rio. Rio then tells Maya, who is still in the hospital, and together they decide to fight back.
11	"Last Match, Warrior's Super Battle!" "!! Rasuto Macchi Uōriāzu!! Chō Kessen!!" (ラストマッチ ウォーリアーズ超決戦!!)	22 March 2004
Rio and Maya take on the New Warriors, firstly with a set of booby traps, then by direct combat. Although overpowered, Rio and Maya use their experience to defeat the two New Warriors, causing the Police Council to begin to argue among themselves about the failure of their plan. Rio and Maya go to Police Headquarters, where they confront their Commander with accusations of corruption, dealing with criminal organisations, and increasing police authority to protect the powerful instead of citizens. The Commander challenges them to a showdown, and they meet her in a car junkyard. The Commander dons a powerful new battle suit and attacks Rio, Maya, and Lilica, and easily defeats them, but when she is about to kill them, Lilica's psychic powers reach another level, and she completely overwhelms and defeats the Commander, saving them all.
12	"Go Warriors! To Infinity and Beyond!" "Ike Uōriāzu!! Eien no Hate ni!!" (けウォーリアーズ!! 永遠の果てに!!)	29 March 2004
Lilica begins using her psychic powers to solve missing persons' crimes while Rio and Maya try to lift the profile of the discredited police force. Maya and Rio accidentally crash into the rear of newlywed Matsuri's car, but the groom isn't Yuji – she dumped him because he took too long to propose to her. Maya, Rio, and Lilica spend a night out together, where Lilica gets very drunk, and Maya tells Rio that she's leaving on a journey. The next morning, the police take Lilica into custody while Rio drives Maya to the railway station. On the way, they hear of a hostage incident at the station. Although Maya says it's not their business, Rio and Maya board the train and find the little girl hostage safe. Lilica hears about the situation and uses her psychic powers to stop the train, and Maya reluctantly admits that they are a team. The Police Supreme Council reveals that they engineered the railway hostage situation and have decided to reinstate the Warriors. Unfortunately for the team, the hopeless Yuji is their new captain.

== Reception ==
Burn Up Scramble was quite a departure in visual style, character design, and plot from the Burn Up W and Burn Up Excess anime. The computer-aided production came in for some criticism in the Anime News Network DVD review which suggested that it gave "the staff new ways of coming up with lazy shortcuts. ... the key frames and poses look loaded with energy, but they're strung together by awkward motions that don't look like fighting at all."

== See also ==
- Burn-Up!
- Burn-Up W
- Burn-Up Excess
