= Jaxon Lee =

American actor

Jason Christopher Lee is an American voice actor and video editor who co-founded the dubbing studio Gaijin Productions with his wife Amanda Winn-Lee. He uses the stage name Jaxon Lee.

== Anime roles ==
- .hack//Legend of the Twilight – Pretty Grunty
- All Purpose Cultural Cat Girl Nuku Nuku – Delinquent on Roof, Guy in Classroom, Newscaster, Scientific Rep; Worker
- Blue Seed – Mamoru Kusanagi
- Bubblegum Crisis: Tokyo 2040 – Daniel, Sewer Crew 4
- Burn Up W – Yuji Naruo
- Burn Up Excess – Yuji Naruo
- Dead Leaves – Retro
- Devil Hunter Yohko – Hideki Kando
- Ellcia – Doner
- Fire Emblem – Dohga
- Golden Boy – Narration, Yakuza A
- Gunsmith Cats – Lead Thug
- MÄR – Ash, Blue-Haired Bully (Ep. 1), Master Moku, Monkey 1 (Ep. 2)
- Neon Genesis Evangelion – Shigeru Aoba
- Neon Genesis Evangelion: Death & Rebirth – Shigeru Aoba
- Plastic Little – Computer Tech
- R.O.D.: Read or Die – Drake Anderson
- Rebuild of Evangelion – Shigeru Aoba (Amazon Prime Video dub)
- Sorcerer Hunters – Kou
- The End of Evangelion – Shigeru Aoba

== Production credits ==
- Blue Seed – Script
- Burn Up Excess – Script
- Dead Leaves – Producer
- Evangelion: Death and Rebirth – Voice Director, Script, Producer
- The End of Evangelion – Voice Director, Script, Producer
- R.O.D.: Read or Die – Producer
