= Dead Leaves =

2004 film by Hiroyuki Imaishi

- North American DVD Cover featuring Pandy (left) and Retro (right)
- Directed by: Hiroyuki Imaishi
- Screenplay by: Takeichi Honda
- Produced by: Katsuji Morishita; Kaoru Mfaume
- Starring: Takako Honda; Kappei Yamaguchi; Yūko Mizutani
- Cinematography: Makoto Kogawa
- Edited by: Junichi Uematsu
- Music by: Yoshihiro Ike
- Production companies: Production I.G; Manga Entertainment
- Distributed by: Shochiku
- Release date: January 17, 2004
- Running time: 52 minutes
- Country: Japan
- Language: Japanese

Dead Leaves is a 2004 Japanese animated science fiction film produced by Manga Entertainment and Production I.G and directed by Hiroyuki Imaishi. It was distributed in Japan by Shochiku, in North America, Canada and the U.K. by Manga Entertainment, and in Australia and New Zealand by Madman Entertainment. The film is notable for its fast pace and energetic visual style.

== Plot ==
In a dystopian Earth, Retro and Pandy, two unlikely renegades, awaken naked with no memory of their former lives, but with superior physical abilities. The two embark on a brief but devastating crime spree for food, clothing, and transportation in downtown Tokyo, but are arrested and sent to the notorious prison Dead Leaves, on the half-destroyed Moon.

Once incarcerated, Retro and Pandy are subjected to activities inside the prison facility, such as forced labor, straitjackets, and mandatory defecation. The facility is led by a warden named Galactica, while the prison guards, 666 and 777, two super-powered prison guards, oversee the activities.

Later, upon realizing Dead Leaves is also a cloning facility, Retro and Pandy have sex and orchestrate a mass prison break. The two later recall further memories as spies who once worked at the facility. To exact revenge on Pandy, Galactica re-creates a deranged fairy tale she remembers from her childhood.

While fighting Galactica, Pandy gives birth to Retro's mutant child, who comes out with a pair of machine guns and kills Galactica. Even so, Galactica absorbs 666 and 777 and transforms into a giant caterpillar. However, the mutant baby enters the caterpillar's body and destroys it along with the station. Pandy and Retro flee the station and eventually crash-land on Earth.

== Characters ==
=== Main characters ===
Retro (レトロ, Retoro)
Voiced by: Kappei Yamaguchi (Japanese); Jaxon Lee (English)
Retro is devoid of any authentic memories from his past life. He staunchly holds the belief that he could have been either a Yakuza gang member or a ninja hitman, attributing this speculation to his remarkable martial skills and a natural proclivity for causing chaos with diverse weapons. Owing to his Yakuza-like tendencies, Retro tends to act on impulse and resort to violence, frequently causing harm to those in his proximity.
Retro has a TV for a head; his original human appearance is shown only in Pandy's flashbacks, having a mop of hair that covers his eyes.
Pandy (パンディー, Pandī)
Voiced by: Takako Honda (Japanese); Amanda Winn-Lee (English)
The heroine, Pandy (so-called because of her panda-like mutated mark), seems to have a special connection with the prison warden, Galactica. Though ignorant of her past, something about her mutated eye causes her to experience bizarre flashbacks and strange, debilitating precognitive episodes. She is very strong at hand-to-hand combat and excellent at using firearms.
Offspring
Voiced by: ? (Japanese); Hal Lublin (English)
The result of Retro and Pandy having sex in prison, their child is born near the end of the story. As Pandy's offspring, he inherits a mutant gene cluster, endowing him with extraordinary powers and resulting in his eyes displaying different colors. Despite only existing for a brief period, rapidly aging from a baby to an old man, he demonstrates care for his parents by sacrificing himself to ensure their safety. Uttering his first and only word, "papa," he expresses this sentiment as he takes a final look at Retro.

=== Prison workers ===
Galactica (ギャラクティカ, Gyarakutika)
Voiced by: Yuko Mizutani (Japanese); Kerry Anderson (English)
Galactica, the enigmatic and tyrannical warden of Dead Leaves prison, oversees cloning and genetic engineering experiments, resulting in an unholy assembly of deformed and infinitely expendable inmates. Possessing a cyborg nature, Galactica integrates an array of weapons and sinister devices directly into her body.
666 (スリーシックス, Surīshikkusu)
Voiced by: Mitsuo Iwata (Japanese); Chad Fifer (English)
Product of the Dead Leaves bio-weapons experiments, 666 (three-six, or referred to as "Triple Six" in the English dub) is a tall, skinny character who moves at high velocity when confronted with a challenge. His primary weapons are two long blades attached to his arms.
777 (スリーセブン, Surīsebun)
Voiced by: Kiyoyuki Yanada (Japanese); Jason C. Miller (English)
777 (three-seven, or referred to as "Triple Seven" in the English dub) is also a product of the Dead Leaves experiments and the bulky, powerful counterpart of 666. Says a quick prayer before going into battle, something 666 admonishes him for, stating it's a little late for that. Tends to prefer his brute strength and the wide assortment of guns he has at his disposal within his body.

== Reception ==
The Encyclopedia of Science Fiction described Dead Leaves as an entertaining, deliberately outrageous anime characterized by relentless action, extreme violence, absurdist humor and frenetic animation. It noted that although the film is exceptionally bloody, its exaggerated cartoon style makes the violence less disturbing than its content might suggest. The encyclopedia cautioned against seeking too much coherence in the increasingly bizarre plot, instead praising the vivid, chaotic animation and the film's willingness to embrace bad taste. It characterized the work as a diverting, screwball experience whose short running time prevents its excesses from becoming tiresome. The encyclopedia also associated the film's distinctive sensibility with the influence of its co-producer, Manga Entertainment, and the company's particular approach to anime in the early 2000s.
