= Allison Keith =

American actress

- Born: June 5, 1974 (age 52); Houston, Texas
- Education: University of Houston
- Occupations: Voice actress, teacher, musician
- Agent: Pastorini-Bosby Talent
- Notable credits: Neon Genesis Evangelion as Misato Katsuragi; Full Metal Panic! as Melissa Mao
- Spouse: Todd Shipp
- Children: 2

Allison Keith-Shipp is an American voice actress who is best known for her English-dubbing work with ADV Films on anime films and television series as Neon Genesis Evangelion, in which she voiced the character Misato Katsuragi. Keith was introduced to voice acting by Amanda Winn Lee when they were in an improv troupe together, and began with the part of Gamera in Gunsmith Cats; she cites Sakura in Blue Seed as her favorite character. She has a bachelor's degree in theater from the University of Houston, and a teacher's certification. She used to live in New York and Los Angeles doing occasional work for Central Park Media and Bandai Entertainment. In 2009, she reprised her role as Misato Katsuragi for the Rebuild of Evangelion films for Funimation, and has been doing voice work for Sentai Filmworks.

== Personal life ==
Keith is married to Todd Shipp, and they have two children. Outside of voice acting, she has worked as a teacher, and realtor.

== Filmography ==
=== Anime ===
List of voice performances in anime
Year	Title	Role	Notes	Source
1996	Golden Boy	Naoko Katsuda		
1996	Neon Genesis Evangelion	Misato Katsuragi		
1996	Blue Seed	Sakura Yamazaki		
2003	All Purpose Cultural Cat Girl Nuku Nuku series	Atsuko Natsume	also Dash	
2003	Full Metal Panic!	Melissa Mao	also season 2	
2004	.hack//Legend of the Twilight	Rena Kunisaki		
2004	Gravion	Leele		
2014	Infinite Stratos series	Tabane Shinonono	also season 2	
2015	Akame ga Kill!	Leone		
2015	Muv Luv Alternative: Total Eclipse	Senna Takamura		
2016	Aoharu x Machinegun	Hanako Saga		
2017	Amagi Brilliant Park	Macaron		

=== Film ===
List of voice performances in feature films
Year	Title	Role	Notes	Source
2002	Neon Genesis Evangelion: Death & Rebirth	Misato Katsuragi		
2002	The End of Evangelion	Misato Katsuragi		
2008–2021	Rebuild of Evangelion series	Misato Katsuragi	limited theatrical release, as Allison Keith Shipp	
