= Maple Town =

1986 Japanese anime series

- Cover of the first DVD box set released in Japan

メイプルタウン物語 (Maple Town Monogatari)
- Genre: Adventure, slice of life
- Anime television series
- Directed by: Junichi Sato
- Produced by: Shinji Nabeshima (Asahi Broadcasting); Azuma Kasuga (Asatsu); Yasuo Yamaguchi
- Music by: Akiko Kosaka
- Studio: Toei Animation
- Licensed by: US: The Kushner-Locke Company
- Original network: ANN (ABC, TV Asahi)
- English network: CA: YTV; HK: TVB Pearl; US: Syndication (episodes 1-10) Nickelodeon (episodes 11-26) The CBN Family Channel
- Original run: January 19, 1986 – January 11, 1987
- Episodes: 52
- Anime film

Maple Town Monogatari
- Directed by: Junichi Sato
- Written by: Chifude Asakura
- Studio: Toei Animation
- Released: July 12, 1986
- Runtime: 30 minutes
- Anime television series

New Maple Town Stories: Palm Town Chapter
- Directed by: Hiroshi Shidara
- Produced by: Shinji Nabeshima (Asahi Broadcasting); Higashi Kasuga (Asatsu); Yuko Sagawa (Asatsu)
- Music by: Akio Kosaka
- Studio: Toei Animation
- Original network: ANN (ABC, TV Asahi)
- Original run: January 18 – December 27, 1987
- Episodes: 50
- Anime film

New Maple Town Stories: Home Town Collection
- Directed by: Hiroshi Shidara
- Written by: Chifude Asakura
- Studio: Toei Animation
- Released: March 14, 1987
- Runtime: 30 minutes

Maple Town, also known as Maple Town Stories (Japanese: メイプルタウン物語, Hepburn: Meipuru Taun Monogatari), is a 1986 Japanese anime series created by Chifude Asakura and directed by Junichi Sato. The series, produced by Toei Animation consists of 52 half-hour episodes, which aired on ABC, TV Asahi and other ANN stations in Japan from January 19, 1986, to January 11, 1987.

The show focuses on the adventures of Patty Rabbit, Bobby Bear and their families, in a small city inhabited by anthropomorphic animals named Maple Town. The series was followed by a 50-episode sequel, New Maple Town Stories: Palm Town Chapter, which retained only Patty Rabbit (and her voice actor, Maya Okamoto) from both series, although Maple Town's citizens made cameos from time to time. To date, this sequel series has not had an official English release.

The show was dubbed into English and syndicated in the United States in 1987. The program spawned collectable figurines with changeable clothing, as well as houses, furniture and vehicles. Tonka was the US licensee and manufacturer.

VHS compilations of Maple Town appeared in North America, Europe and Japan during the late 1980s and early 1990s. As of 2013, official DVDs of the show had surfaced in Japan, Spain and Hungary, with no release plans announced for other territories.

== Plot summary ==
Patty Rabbit, along with her family, arrives in Maple Town, a small town inhabited by friendly animals, but in a train heist by the sly – if usually "endearingly unsuccessful" – thief, Wilde Wolf stole the mailbag from her father and escaped into the forest. Soon she followed after him to retrieve the mailbag. In the midst of getting the bag back from the thief, she befriends a boy of her age named Bobby Kumanoff who has the bag. After they escape from Wilde Wolf and outwit him, they deliver the mailbag safely to her father. Soon, the Rabbit Family settles in Maple Town as mail carriers and the bitter, yet sweet friendship of Patty and Bobby begins to blossom. At the same time they try to foil Wilde Wolf's plans.

The series' setting is Canada around the 1920s, while the setting of Palm Town Chapter is based on the West Coast of the United States around the 1980s.

== Characters ==
=== Maple Town ===
- The Rabbit Family – Patty, Rachel, Mr. Thumper Rabbit, Mrs. Thumpis Rabbit, Ann, Ricky, Grandma and Grandpa Rabbit, Cousin Rabbit, Roger Rabbit
- The Bear Family – Bobby, Mr. Bear, Mrs. Bear, Jonny, Bryan and Gilly, Bonny
- The Fox Family – Fanny, Mr. Fredrick Fox, Mrs. Florence Fox and Fred
- The Cat Family – Mr. Kevin Cat and Mrs. Kathy Cat
- The Dog Family – Danny, Dr. Dog, Mrs. Dog and Donny
- The Squirrel Family – Suzie, Squire Squirrel, Mrs. Squirrel and Skippy
- The Pig Family – Penny, Mr. Pig, Mrs. Pig and Polly
- The Raccoon Family – Ruthie, Mr. Raccoon, Mrs. Raccoon and Roxie
- The Mouse Family – Missie, Mr. Mouse, Mrs. Mouse and Marty
- The Beaver Family – Bucky, Mr. Beaver, Mrs. Beaver and Bitsy
- The Badger Family – Bert, Mr. Badger, Mrs. Badger and Betty
- The Mole Family – Maggie, Mr. Mole, Mrs. Mole and Mikey
- Kirby Cat
- Mayor Dandy Lion
- Miss Fulleen Deer Bambi Deer
- Sheriff Barney Bulldog
- Sheriff Barney Bulldog's Wife
- Oscar Otter
- Master Monkey
- Dr. Goat
- Wilde Wolf Gretel Wolf (aka Gretel)
- Mr. Turtle
- Kangaroos – Mr. Kangaroo, Mrs. Kangaroo, Coca Kangaroo
- Mr. Walius

=== Palm Town ===
- The Pike Family - Mrs. Jane, Mr. George, Alice
- The Cocker Family - Rolley, Peter, Mr. Parabura, Mrs. Dahlia
- The Terrier Family - Joey, Mr. Philip, Florence
- The White Family - Sheila, Roger, Mark, Mr. Ralph
- The Sheep Family - Mr. Charlie, Mrs. Mary, Sisi, Remi
- Marina Dietrich
- Gunter and Big Bro

US version:

- VP of production: J. Edward Bergh
- Supervising director: Robert V. Barron
- Live action producer and director: Mary Jo Blue
- Music: Haim Saban and Shuki Levy
- Music coordination: Andrew Dimitroff
- Video editing: Larry Porsche
- Executive producers: Haim Saban, Edd Gripes and Ray Volpe
- Distribution: Saban/The Maltese Companies

== Voice cast ==
=== Japanese ===
- Patty Hope-Rabbit: Maya Okamoto
- Marcel Hope-Rabbit: Hideyuki Tanaka
- Christine Hope-Rabbit: Reiko Mutō, Eiko Masuyama (episodes 42–45)
- Ann Hope-Rabbit: Keiko Han
- Bobby Kumanoff: Yoku Shioya
- Diana Kondelick: Mayumi Shō
- Puripurin Pick: Satoko Yamano
- Judy Rismond: Chisato Nakajima, Naoko Watanabe (from episode 29 onwards)
- Johnny Karafuto: Hiroshi Takemura
- Gretel: Yusaku Yara
- Miss Mireille: Chiyoko Kawashima
- Clark Ryan: Jōji Yanami
- Officer Otto: Kōzō Shioya

=== English ===
- Janice Adams - Mrs. Maple (live-action segments)
- Reba West – Patty Rabbit
- Barbara Goodson – Bobby Bear, Mikey Mole
- Steve Kramer – Wilde Wolf
- Maureen O'Connell – Fanny Fox
- Ted Layman – Mayor Lion
- Edie Mirman – Miss Deer
- Gregory Snegoff – Sheriff Barney Bulldog
- Alexandra Kenworthy – Mrs. Fox
- Additional voices: Robert Axelrod, Doug Lee, Heidi Lenhart, Kerrigan Mahan, Dave Mallow, Michael McConnohie, Tom Wyner

== Production ==
The series was produced by Toei Animation, Asatsu and Asahi Broadcasting. Maple Town was created by Chifude Asakura and directed by Junichi Sato. It served as one of the first projects for Kunihiko Ikuhara, who later joined the crew of Sailor Moon and Revolutionary Girl Utena. Ikuhara served as an assistant director and production manager for some of the show's later episodes.

=== United States ===
In October 1986, toy manufacturer Tonka acquired the rights for US$2.5–3 million and became its US licensee, launching a toy line and ad campaign early the following year. Tonka invested US$7 million on television ads for the toy line. An English-dubbed version, airing in tandem with the toy promotion, starred actress Karen Hartman (credited as Janice Adams), known previously for her other children's TV role as Talkatoo Cockatoo on Zoobilee Zoo, as Mrs. Maple in its book-ending live-action segments. Mrs. Maple was the only human inhabitant of the title town in this version, and she offered each episode's moral lesson. The voice cast included Reba West as Patty Rabbit and Steve Kramer as Wilde Wolf.

The English version of Maple Town was produced by Saban Entertainment and The Maltese Companies, the latter of which also produced Spiral Zone, another syndicated series with Tonka, and the 1988 animated feature Pound Puppies and the Legend of Big Paw.

== Music ==
Puripin Pick's voice actress Satoko Yamano performs the opening song which has the same title メイプルタウン物語 as the overall series. It is 90 seconds in length and a cover of it appears in the 2001 video game Pop'n Music Animelo 2.

Satoko Yamano also performed the opening theme for The Wonderful Wizard of Oz (TV series) which came out the same here.

== Broadcast history ==
The original Maple Town series aired on Sunday mornings in Japan on TV Asahi, from January 19, 1986, until January 11, 1987. Following its 52nd episode, its follow-up, New Maple Town Story: Palm Town Chapter (新メイプルタウン物語-パームタウン編, Shin Maple Town Monogatari: Palm Town Hen), aired in the same time slot.

The first ten episodes of the English dub by Saban Entertainment and The Maltese Companies premiered in barter syndication in 1987 as a trial run on US television, then sixteen more episodes premiered on Nickelodeon, where it aired until September 1, 1989. It then aired on The CBN Family Channel/The Family Channel from September 4, 1989 until September 13, 1990. A 65-episode run was originally announced, but only 39 ever reached US television.

In the late 1980s and early 1990s, European stations aired Maple Town in their various native languages. In Spain, TVE aired the program under the title La aldea del arce, starting in 1987. In France, the series was distributed by IDDH and broadcast from May 3, 1987, on FR3 in the program Amuse 3 under the name Les Petits Malins. It also aired on RTL Veronique in the Netherlands (as Avonturen in Maple Town); in Finland under the title Seikkailumetsä; in Sweden as Äventyrsskogen; and on Hungary's RTL Klub channel as Juharfalvi történetek.

As with Japan, several other countries aired both series of the Maple Town franchise. In Italy, Mediaset's Italia 1 broadcast both iterations of Maple Town during the late 1980s (under the titles Maple Town: Un nido di simpatia and Evviva Palm Town). The combined series aired as Les petits malins on FR3 in France at the time. On Nasza TV's showings in Poland, the show was known as Opowiesci z Klonowego Miasteczka and Opowiesci z Palmowego Miasteczka. In Hong Kong, Maple Town aired on the ATV network during 1991. Both shows also aired in Arabic speaking nations with the first series broadcast under أرنوبة ودبدوب (Arnoba Wa Dabdoob, Arnoba and Dabdood) and second airing under مدينة النخيل (Madina Al Nakheel, Palms Town).

== Home video ==
During the 1990s, Toei Video released a ten-tape collection of Maple Town, each consisting of three episodes in their original airing order. In 2013, TC Entertainment released the original series in DVD box sets as part of Toei's Recollection Anime Library lineup. The first box set was released on September 27, and the second set on October 30. Palm Town Chapter series was also released in the same label on November 27 for the first box set and on December 25 for the second box set.

Select episodes of Saban's US dub were released on VHS from late 1987 until 1990 by Family Home Entertainment and Tonka Home Video. Each tape consisted of two stories each, except for the first release, "Welcome to Maple Town". No less than eight English episodes were distributed in the UK by the now-defunct M.S.D. (Multiple Sound Distributors) label. Multicom Entertainment Group, who owns the US dub (by the way of their acquisition of The Kushner-Locke library in 2013), currently has no plans to release the entire series on home media or onto any streaming service, likely due to them having a hard time licensing the rights to use the cartoons from Toei.

In the Netherlands, CNR Video released a Dutch dub of the first two episodes in 1992. The stories were entitled "De Overval op de Trein" and "Voor het eerst naar de nieuwe school" in the Dutch language.

The entire original series was released on DVD in Spain by Divisa Home Video, in Japan by TC Entertainment, and Hungary's Fümoto released some episodes onto that format.

== Reception ==
Early in its run, the U.S. edit received a rating from Ellen Klein of South Carolina's Rock Hill Herald. She commended the "wonderful, shiny style" of the animation, and also wrote that the series "is a far cry from the warlike fantasies of He-Man and ThunderCats, but it offers plenty of thrills and excitement for the preschool viewer".

== See also ==
- Sylvanian Families, the toyline and animated TV series
