= Amanda Winn-Lee =

American voice actress

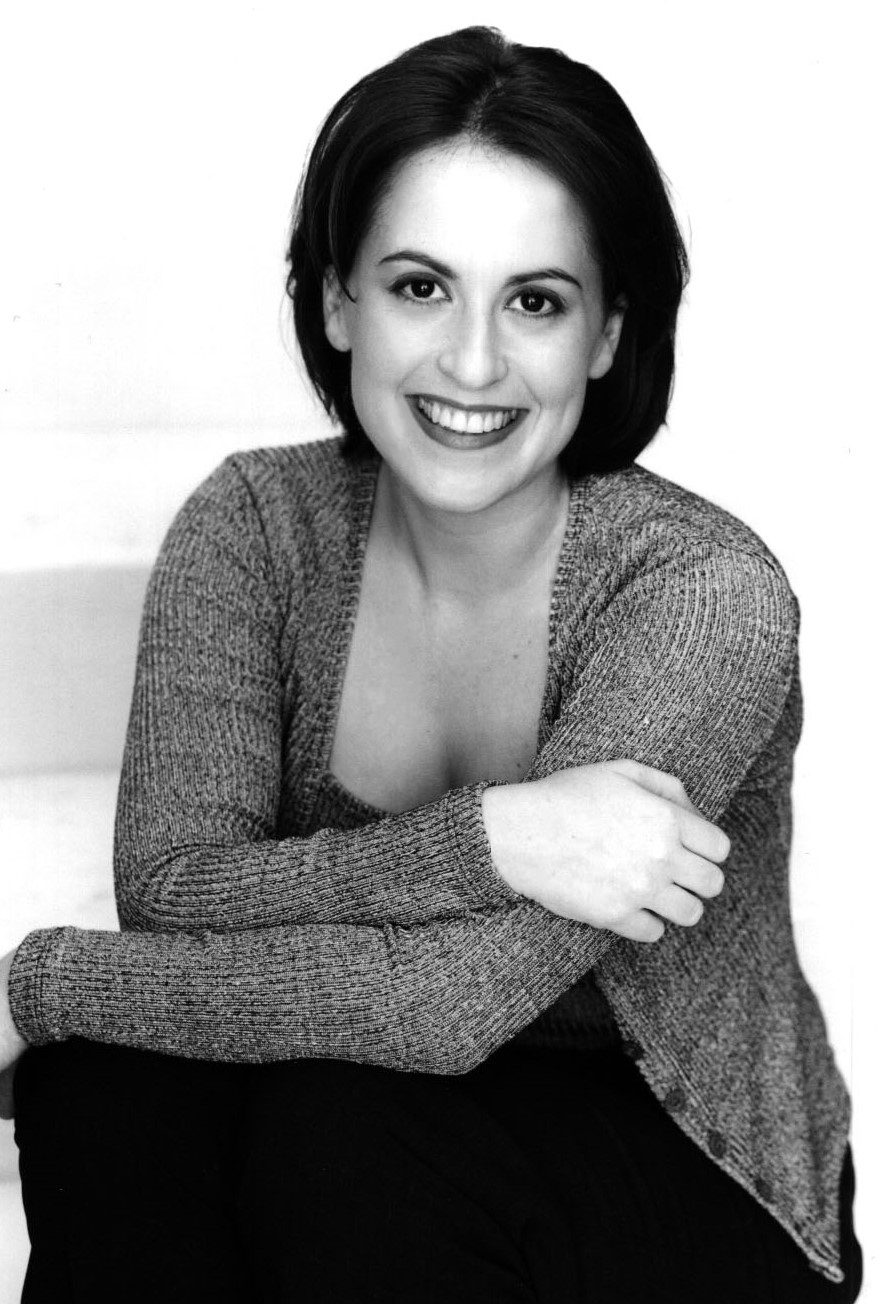
- Education: Wesleyan University (BA)
- Occupations: Voice actress; ADR director; script writer
- Years active: 1995–present
- Spouse: Jaxon Lee (m. 1997)
- Children: 1

Amanda Winn-Lee (née Winn) is an American semi-retired voice actress, ADR director and script writer who works mainly on anime dubs. She was the voice of Mimiru in .hack//SIGN, Rally Vincent in Gunsmith Cats, Yohko Mano in Devil Hunter Yohko, Momiji Kushinada in Blue Seed, Yukiko Amagi in Persona 4, and was featured most notably as Rei Ayanami in Neon Genesis Evangelion. Aside from voice work she quite often handles production, ADR direction and the scripting of various projects for her dubbing company Gaijin Productions, LLC.

== Career ==
She can be heard in the commentary for the Region 1 The End of Evangelion DVD along with fellow voice actors Taliesin Jaffe and husband/Gaijin co-owner Jaxon Lee.

Expanding on her anime work, Winn-Lee also provided the voice of Konoko, the protagonist of the Bungie video game Oni.

Winn-Lee served as ADR director, script writer and producer for the English versions of The End of Evangelion and Evangelion: Death and Rebirth. She also directed and performed leading roles in the English versions of Dead Leaves and the Read or Die OVA.

She had been working with ADV Films for years before she moved out to create Gaijin Productions.

It was suggested by Spike Spencer (her friend as well as fellow voice actor) at Nan Desu Kan 2007 that she was interested in reprising her role(s) in the upcoming Rebuild of Evangelion films. However, in May 2009, North American anime distributor Funimation announced that the role of Rei for the first film Evangelion: 1.0 You Are (Not) Alone would be voiced by Brina Palencia, who is under contract to voice Rei Ayanami for the three remaining Evangelion "Rebuild" films. However, Winn-Lee returned to voice Rei for the 2021 Amazon release of the entire Rebuild series, including the new Evangelion: 3.0+1.0 Thrice Upon a Time.

== Personal life ==
Amanda and Jason Lee's son, Nicholas "Noodle" Lee, was born in November 2004. Her son was soon discovered to have infant leukemia, requiring extensive treatment before he was one year old. Amanda and Jason were not involved in any new projects for several years, because they were caring for their son. However, by November 2008, Nicholas had been cancer-free for three years, which is the benchmark for doctors that his odds of cancer recurrence are virtually non-existent. She wrote a book about these experiences in a memoir called The Noodle Chronicles: Everything I Know About Cheating Death I Learned from My Kid, which was released as an e-book. In 2025, her home was destroyed by the Palisades Fire.

== Dubbing roles ==
=== Anime dubbing ===
- .hack//Intermezzo – Mimiru
- .hack//SIGN – Mimiru
- .hack//Legend of the Twilight – Magi
- .hack//Unison – Mimiru
- Battle Angel – Gally / Alita (ADV Films dub)
- Blue Seed – Momiji Fujimiya, Kaede Kunikida
- Burn Up! – Reimi (debut role)
- Burn Up W, Burn Up Excess – Rio Kinezono
- Dead Leaves – Pandy
- Devil Hunter Yohko – Yohko Mano, Ayako Mano
- Dragon Half – Princess Vina
- Ellcia – Crystel
- F3 – Hiroe Ogawa (Soft Cel dub, credited as Helen Bed)
- Fire Emblem – Elis
- Geneshaft – Mika Seido
- Ghost in the Shell: Stand Alone Complex – Kurutan
- Golden Boy – Girl A, producer
- Gunsmith Cats – Rally Vincent
- Marchen Awakens Romance – Gido
- Neon Genesis Evangelion – Rei Ayanami, Pen Pen, Yui Ikari (movies only)
- Persona 4: The Animation – Yukiko Amagi
- Persona 5: The Animation – Ichiko Ohya
- Plastic Little – Titaniva Mu Koshigaya
- Read or Die (OVA) – Nancy "Miss Deep" Makuhari
- Spriggan – Flight Attendant
- Sukeban Deka – Saki Asamiya
- Super Atragon – Annette

=== Video game credits ===
- .hack//Quarantine – Mimiru
- .hack//Outbreak – Mimiru
- BlazBlue: Cross Tag Battle – Yukiko Amagi
- Bravely Second: End Layer – Magnolia Arch
- Heavy Gear II – Pinter, O'Neill
- Oni – Konoko
- Persona 4 – Yukiko Amagi
- Persona 5 – Ichiko Ohya
- Revolution 60 – Crimson 09
- Saints Row: The Third – Additional Voices
- Saints Row IV – Additional Voices
- Star Trek: Elite Force II – Kleeya
- Tail Concerto – Alicia Pris
- Trauma Team – Maria Torres

== Production staff ==
=== ADR director/voice direction ===
- A Silent Voice
- Battle Angel
- Blue Seed
- Burn Up Excess
- Burn Up W
- Dead Leaves
- Devil Hunter Yohko
- Ellica
- The End of Evangelion
- Evangelion: Death and Rebirth
- Fire Emblem
- Gunsmith Cats
- Neon Genesis Evangelion
- Plastic Little
- Read or Die

=== Script adaptation ===
- A Silent Voice
- Blue Seed
- Burn Up Excess
- Dead Leaves
- Ellica
- The End of Evangelion
- Evangelion: Death and Rebirth
- Project ARMS
- Read or Die
