= Burn-Up W =

1996 original video animation

- DVD cover art for Burn-Up W
- Genre: Comedy, science fiction
- Created by: Yasunori Ide; Jun Kanzaki
- Original video animation
- Directed by: Hiroshi Negishi
- Written by: Katsuhiko Chiba (1–2); Sumio Uetake (3–4)
- Music by: Hiroyuki Namba
- Studio: AIC
- Licensed by: AUS: Madman Entertainment; NA: ADV Films
- Released: April 10, 1996 – September 26, 1996
- Runtime: 25 minutes
- Episodes: 4
- Manga
- Written by: Oh! great
- Published by: Tokuma Shoten
- Magazine: Weekly Shōnen Captain
- Published: 1997
- Volumes: 1

Burn-Up W is a 1996 anime OVA directed by Hiroshi Negishi. It was soon followed by a series version called Burn-Up Excess, though it occasionally lacks continuity with the series. The OVA consists of four episodes, chronicling Team Warrior through more missions.

== Plot ==
Burn Up W is about the adventures of Team Warrior, a band of highly skilled and completely reckless female cops. The team features the loose cannon Rio, trigger-happy Maya and ace hacker Lilica, who get the job done, regardless of the cost to the Tokyo Police Department or the city.

== Main characters ==
Rio Kinezono (利緒)
Rio is Team Warrior's "Pointman" on many missions. She's blonde, very buxom, and rather ditzy, and she can't seem to keep money in her wallet. Along with that, she is always looking for a wealthy Mr. Right so she can ditch her job as a civil servant.

In Burn Up W, it is unknown why or how she joins Warrior. Unlike Maya, Rio is more skilled in hand-to-hand combat, but is known to use a firearm now and again (for example during the "Skin Dive" and "Policetown Assault" episodes). Although she won't admit it, she noticeably has some feeling towards her partner Yuji Naruo, but since the W OVA is only 4 episodes it was never expanded on.

Voiced by: Yuka Imai (Japanese); Amanda Winn Lee (English)

Maya Jingu (真弥)
Team Warrior's green haired gun-toting maniac. Maya is about the same height as Rio with relatively the same body measurements. She is Team Warrior's primary sniper and gun user. She mainly joined to shoot as much as she wanted, which causes problems because she doesn't get to shoot that much, which in many cases leads her to feeling something akin to sexual frustration. To her, the bigger the gun the better; no matter whatever gun she uses she'll find some satisfaction (sexual or otherwise). Many times Maya is overheard saying that if she doesn't get to shoot more, she'll quit the police and become a mercenary.

Maya is mostly paired up with Rio on missions and covers her back on most occasions.

Voiced by: Maya Okamoto (Japanese); Rene Foresman (English)

Lilica Ebett (リリカ)
Lilica is the tech expert on the team. She has pink hair and is the shortest of all the Burn Up W characters. Lilica is the daughter of a very wealthy businessman, but it is unknown in the OVA who he is or why Lilica is working at Policetown anyway if she has so much money. To highlight the wealth of her father, at one point she refuses a space satellite as a birthday gift from her father.

Lilica is never out in the field with Rio and Maya, instead she is at the Warrior computer with Maki as support.

Voiced by: Sakura Tange (Japanese); Kimberly Yates (English)

Nanvel Candlestick (ナンベル)
Nanvel is the resident engineer on Team Warrior. During the Vitural Idol case, Maki enlisted the aid of Nanvel who has developed the "El Heggunte" android hunter robot (which bears a striking resemblance to Unit 01 of Evangelion fame).

Nanvel is a genius when it comes to robotics and cyber technology, but due to her department being totally underfunded, she is stuck in the Policetown hangar bay way below the base. Through some of Maki's connections, Nanvel's department receives more funding and we begin to see her more in the OVA.

Similar to the way Maya has a gun fetish, Nanvel becomes hot and heavy about mechanical things and robots. In the last episode of the OVA, she equips Rio with a new force knuckle and Maya with a new anti-tank shotgun.
Voiced by: Yuri Amano (Japanese); Carol Amerson (English)

Maki Kawasaki (マキ)
Maki is the team leader of the Warrior strike force. She is tough as nails and at times can be quite manipulative when it comes to conning her superiors into giving her team more leeway in some missions. This same social cunning is employed on Rio often, to ensure that the hot-headed blonde performs as needed during missions.

Maki acts like a mother figure to the Warrior team, guiding them and giving them focus, but she seems to have more of a connection to Rio than anyone else on the team. It is rumored that the Maki of Burn-Up W is the same Maki from the original Burn-Up! OVA back in the 90's and that Rio is acting very similarly to how the Burn-Up! of Maki used to act which almost gives their relationship a passing the torch feel. In W, Maki is never in the field with Rio and Maya.

Voiced by: Yumiko Shibata (Japanese); Tiffany Grant (English)

Yuji Naruo (ユージ)
Yuji is the token pervert in the Burn up series. He is constantly looking up girls' skirts or going into porn stores. But for all his faults he is still very lovable, he loves Rio a lot and at times will rush into danger to save her, but will wind up getting caught himself forcing Rio to save him.

In W, Yuji is a pervert but he has his redeeming qualities. His W version seems to only be interested in Rio and porn, because he never makes an advance at Maya or Nanvel (even though Nanvel dresses way less than Rio and Maya). Although he takes a mostly inactive role, he is still considered a member of Warrior and pilots the helicopter and other vehicles for special Warrior missions.

Voiced by: Ryotaro Okiayu (Japanese), Jason Lee (English)

Miss Ruby

Miss Ruby is the mysterious woman who works in Falcon Claw. She takes the hotel and its patrons hostage. She seems to always wear a pair of shades too and her hair is lavender colored and comes down to her shoulders (Red when wearing a wig). Ruby is also quite skilled with handling machines. She is only referred to as "Chief Terrorist".

Voiced by: Katsuki Masako (Japanese); Marcy Rae (English)

== Episodes ==
No.	Title	Japanese release date	English release date
1	"Skin Dive"; Transliteration: "Sukin Daibu" (Japanese: スキンダイヴ)	April 10, 1996	June 25, 1996
Representatives from governments around the world are gathered in Tokyo for an International Peace Forum. A mysterious woman and her team enter the building where the forum is being held and take the leaders and the building's occupants hostage. Police surround the building and sniper Maya impatiently awaits the order to fire on a hot rooftop. The terrorist group, which identifies itself as Falcon Claw, makes some strange demands including that the most popular idol singer, Yumi Kawai, perform a nude bungee jump from the top of the building. Their real strategy is using a virtual drug device to brainwash the leaders into getting their countries to purchase the devices after they leave. Team Warrior is dispatched to save the day and Rio performs the nude bungee jump as a distraction. The amateurish terrorists are captured however the female mastermind escapes.
2	"Search for the Virtual Idol"; Transliteration: "Den-nou aidoru Sagase" (Japanese: 電脳アイドル捜せ)	June 26, 1996	September 24, 1996
Beautiful Virtual Idol Maria is the product of a company who also manufacture illegal battle androids. Maria only exists in cyberspace but yearns to experience the real world and escapes in a spare battle android body. Team Warrior is assigned to investigate an underworld battle over the android distribution and to find the now missing Maria. Maria, now in the android body, demands a ransom for her return, but when Rio prepares to hand over the money, the company's battle android attacks and captures her. Nanavel arrives with her huge mechanical attack android AFH-X01, El-Heggunte, but it malfunctions, destroying a city bridge and creating a massive budget blow-out. During the battle, Nanavel saves Maria by transferring her consciousness into El-Heggunte, much to Maria's disgust.
3	"Policetown Assault – Act 1"; Transliteration: "Porisutaun Kyousyuu-Akuto-1" (Japanese: ポリスタウン強襲-Act-1)	August 25, 1996	November 19, 1996
The police raid a smuggling operation and acquire a mysterious virtual reality device. Meanwhile there is an insight into Team Warrior's personal lives. Rio owes money and goes to a store to sell her used underwear, where she runs into Yuji, who's looking for used uniforms from the Olympic swim team. Maya plays target practice with a robber who's trying to escape with a bag of money. Lilica gets a call from her wealthy father who offers her birthday presents, such as a beach resort and a satellite. The next day, police headquarters are taken over by a terrorist group which includes Wolf Head, Jackal Head and Dober Head. Chisato, an accountant and a friend of Rio's is among many other police killed during the raid. Team Warrior is the only group left that can re-take the base.
4	"Policetown Assault – Act 2"; Transliteration: "Porisutaun Kyousyuu-Akuto-2" (Japanese: ポリスタウン強襲-Act-2)	September 26, 1996	March 25, 1997
Team Warrior decide to take back the police headquarters from the terrorists rather than retreat with the approval of Maki Kawasaki although she is criticized by headquarters for her decision. Maya and Rio strip down to their brief battle undergarments and don their battle suits while the rest provide technical support. Maya has a new gun that's lighter, but more powerful than a tank gun and Rio gets a weapon called the "Armored Knucklebuster" which she wears it on her forearm giving her greater strength when she punches. Maya manages to take out Wolf Head, and Rio manages to take out Jackal Head and then they confront Dober Head disguised as a policeman but gain no information about their intentions. Although they won the battle, Team Warrior may not have won the war against the mysterious woman behind the manufacture of the deadly virtual reality devices.

== See also ==
- Burn-Up Scramble
