= Blue Seed =

Japanese manga series and its franchise

- Genre: Action; Comedy; Science fantasy
- Manga
- Written by: Yuzo Takada
- Published by: Takeshobo
- Imprint: Bamboo Comics
- Magazine: Comic Ganma
- Original run: March 1992 – June 1996
- Volumes: 2
- Anime television series
- Directed by: Jun Kamiya
- Produced by: Masaki Sawanobori; Naohiro Hayashi; Noriko Kobayashi; Yukinao Shimoji; Yutaka Sugiyama
- Written by: Naruhisa Arakawa
- Music by: Kenji Kawai
- Studio: Production I.G; Ashi Productions
- Licensed by: NA: ADV Films (1996–2009); Discotek Media (2018–present) (home video); Maiden Japan (2019–present) (streaming)
- Original network: TXN (TV Tokyo)
- English network: NA: Anime Network
- Original run: October 5, 1994 – March 29, 1995
- Episodes: 26
- Video game

Blue Seed: Kushinadahirokuden
- Developer: Sega
- Publisher: Sega
- Platform: Sega Saturn
- Released: June 23, 1995
- Original video animation

Blue Seed 2
- Directed by: Jun Kamiya (#1–2); Kiyoshi Murayama (#3)
- Produced by: Masaki Sawanobori; Toshimichi Ootsuki; Yukinao Shimozi
- Written by: Naruhisa Arakawa
- Music by: Kenji Kawai
- Studio: Production I.G (#1–2); Xebec (#3)
- Licensed by: NA: ADV Films (2003–2009); Discotek Media (2018–present) (home video); Maiden Japan (2019–present) (streaming)
- Released: July 24, 1996 – February 4, 1998
- Runtime: 30 minutes per episode
- Episodes: 3
- icon

Blue Seed (stylized as BLUE SEED) is a Japanese manga series written and illustrated by Yuzo Takada. The main character, Momiji Fujimiya, is a descendant of the Princess Kushinada (奇稲田姫, Kushinada-hime) from Japanese mythology. When Japan is menaced by Aragami (荒神, Aragami; lit. "angry gods") spawned by Yamata no Orochi, Momiji is intended to be sacrificed to appease the Aragami. She instead, however, becomes a member of the Terrestrial Administration Center (TAC), a secret agency charged with fighting them.

Ashi Productions and Production I.G. produced an anime adaptation for broadcast on Japan's TV Tokyo. The anime series ran for 26 episodes, originally airing from October 5, 1994, to March 29, 1995. An original video animation (OVA), Blue Seed 2, was released in three episodes between 1996 and 1998. Both the anime and OVA (under the name Blue Seed Beyond) were licensed by ADV Films in the United States until 2009, when the company shut down. They were later licensed by Discotek Media for a SDBD release on December 18, 2018.

== Plot ==
In 1992, Momiji Fujimiya is a middle school student living with her mother and grandmother in the city of Izumo, Shimane. One day, she is confronted on her way to school by a cat-eyed man with blue magatama beads embedded in his hands, who attempts to kill her. He refers to her as Kushinada. Momiji is saved by the sudden appearance of two government officials, one of whom shoots the man in the arm and sends him fleeing.

Momiji is intrigued as to why she was referred to as the Kushinada. She discovers that the Kushinada refers to an ancient princess whose blood holds the power to stop the ancient monsters known as Aragami by sending them to an eternal sleep. Momiji dismisses the idea that she could be such a person, but reconsiders after vines begin to appear from every crack and opening attempting to capture her.

Momiji tries to escape, not knowing that the vines are being employed by a powerful Aragami known as the Yamata no Orochi. She is saved by the man with the magatamas embedded into his hands, who introduces himself as Mamoru Kusanagi. He confronts Orochi using Momiji as bait. The plan fails and the government officials appear again. They reveal themselves to be members of the Terrestrial Administration Center (TAC for short), and subdue Orochi. However, with the last of its strength, it attacks Kusanagi.

Momiji saves Kusanagi by taking Orochi's blow. Impaled by the Aragami, instead of dying, she is instead fused with the magatama, more specifically identified as a mitama, which gives Momiji the ability to sense the presence of other Aragami. The TAC agents explain that they are an organization dedicated to defeating the Aragami, who seek to destroy humanity. The current Kushinada, Momiji, must aid them because the other Kushinada, Momiji's twin sister Kaede Kunikida, is now dead. Momiji, wishing to discover more about the twin sister she never knew and also to fulfill her destiny, agrees to join the TAC under the protection of Kusanagi, who wishes to destroy his former masters, the Aragami.

Kusanagi repeatedly attempts to kill Murakumo, a man with eight mitamas who kills any renegade Aragami. Kaede reappears along with a strange energy field in Tokyo. Murakumo and Kaede intend to resurrect the god Susanoo and purify the world of humanity's influences, with Kaede acting as the leader of the movement.

There is also a three episode OVA, Blue Seed Beyond, which takes place two years after the end of the TV series. It concerns what seems to be a resurgence of aragami (actually created via biotechnology), and introduces a new character, Valencia Tachibana. Like Kusanagi, she was implanted with a mitama without turning into a full aragami.

== Characters ==
- Momiji Fujimiya (藤宮 紅葉, Fujimiya Momiji): Momiji is the descendant of the "Kushinada". She lives in Izumo, where Princess Kushinada lived. An eighth-grade student, she was unprepared to understand her destiny to battle the Aragami. She becomes a member of the TAC in order to stop the Aragami from destroying humanity. An ironic twist of fate has Momiji carrying a mitama – an Aragami "soul" – embedded in her chest. At awkward times, Momiji is the recipient of panty shots and jokes about the type of panties she wears. Her relationship with Kusanagi takes a turn for the better during the shielded town incident, where she finally confesses her love for him, and he in turn tells her to wait for him. Voiced by: Megumi Hayashibara (Japanese); Amanda Winn-Lee (English), Monica Rial (English, OVA)
- Mamoru Kusanagi (草薙 護, Kusanagi Mamoru): He was given seven mitama with the expressed mission that when he was older, he would protect the Kushinada from harm. He was very close to Kaede, Momiji's twin sister, before her sacrifice in the tunnels of Tokyo. After Kaede's demise he goes to Momiji to kill her, in order to be free of the Aragami. He comes around, however, in the second episode, and from then on makes it his sole purpose to keep Momiji from harm. He eventually falls in love with her. Kusanagi often pokes fun at Momiji's choice of panties just to anger her. Kusanagi gains his 8th mitama from Momiji when he rescues her from danger in the last few episodes, which gives him the power to fight Murakumo on an even level. Voiced by: Kazuhiko Inoue (Japanese); Jaxon Lee (English), Matt Kelley (English, OVA)
- Daitetsu Kunikida (国木田 大哲, Kunikida Daitetsu): Daitetsu, or Mr. Kunikida, is the Chief Director of the TAC. When Kaede and Momiji were born, Mr. Kunikida raised Kaede like his own daughter, but he exploited her ability to track down and kill the Aragami. When Kaede sacrificed herself, he felt heartbroken. With Momiji in the TAC, Mr. Kunikida decides not to exploit her abilities like he did with Kaede and instead treats her like a normal girl. He usually drives a Citroën XM. Voiced by: Akio Ōtsuka (Japanese); Rob Mungle (English)
- Azusa Matsudaira (松平 梓, Matsudaira Azusa): Azusa is the science officer and experimental biologist in the TAC. Azusa is rarely on the field due to her research and development background. She constructs biological weapons for the TAC to use against the Aragami. She is a divorced mother of one. Voiced by: Yoshiko Sakakibara (Japanese); Sharon Shawnessey (English)
- Ryouko Takeuchi (竹内 涼子, Takeuchi Ryōko): A former member of Tokyo Metropolitan Police, Ryoko uses her police instincts to help the TAC. Ryoko uses her standard police issue weapons in conjunction with weapons modified to be used against the Aragami. She is in love with Kunikida. Voiced by: Ai Orikasa (Japanese); Marcy Rae (English)
- Koume Sawaguchi (沢口 小梅, Sawaguchi Koume): Koume wears a pink jumpsuit, but never acts feminine. She is loud, brash and aggressive due to her stint in the Japan Self-Defense Forces. She was discharged by the SDF and transferred to the TAC as a result of insubordination. Her philosophy is based on the "bigger gun" theory and she uses her military mind and muscle to destroy the Aragami. She has a soft spot for puppies, enjoys playing matchmaker to Momiji and Kusanagi, and at the end of the series, falls in love with co-worker Yaegashi. Voiced by: Kotono Mitsuishi (Japanese); Tiffany Grant (English)
- Yoshiki Yaegashi (八重樫 良樹, Yaegashi Yoshiki): The stereotypical computer nerd, Yaegashi does computer analogy for the TAC. On off days, he enjoys hentai games on his computer. He also has a program that pinpoints the Aragami's weak points and attacks, but it doubles as a program to predict what animal would appear on Momiji's panties. He has a love/hate relationship with Koume through most of the series. He becomes engaged to her in the OVA. Voiced by: Yūji Ueda (Japanese); Kurt Stoll (English)
- Sakura Yamazaki (山咲 桜, Yamazaki Sakura): Sakura spent most of her life training in the United States. She works as a private occult investigator, using Shinto magic and magic seals to stop the Aragami. She often flirts with Kusanagi, as she finds him both attractive and a suitable partner for her work, and does not consider Momiji a serious competitor for his heart. Though she is featured in the title sequence alongside the main cast, she does not debut until episode 8 and appears only sporadically throughout the series. Voiced by: Sakiko Tamagawa (Japanese); Allison Keith (English)
- Kaede Kunikida (国木田 楓, Kunikida Kaede): Kaede is the twin sister of Momiji and Kunikida's adopted daughter. Her talents were used to detect Aragami for the TAC, but after realizing she was merely a tool and not a person, she sacrificed herself, only to return on the side of the Aragami. Voiced by: Mitsuki Yayoi (Japanese); Amanda Winn Lee (English)
- Susano-Oh (スサノオ, Susanoo): Susano-Oh is an all-powerful god who is the guardian deity of the Aragami. In the legend, Susano-Oh killed the monster Yamata-no-Orochi and married the Princess Kushinada. Kaede and Murakumo awakened him as part of their plan to create a world of nothing but plants. Voiced by: Jun Kitagawa
- Murakumo (ムラクモ): Murakumo was chosen by the Aragami to kill rogue Aragami, those who do not serve the will of Susano-Oh. He has embraced the power of the Aragami and plans on unleashing that power against humanity. Murakumo has eight mitama embedded in his body. Voiced by: Jouji Nakata (Japanese); Aaron Krohn (English)
- Valencia Tachibana (バレンシア・タチバナ, Barenshia Tachibana): Valencia shows up in the OVA. Like Kusanagi, she was implanted with a mitama without turning into a full aragami. Voiced by: Junko Iwao (Japanese); Kira Vincent-Davis (English)

== Media ==
=== Manga ===
The manga's complete title is Aokushimitama Blue Seed (碧奇魂ブルーシード). Originally serialized by Takeshobo in Comic Ganma between March 1992 and June 1996, its 17 chapters were also collected into two Japanese Tankōbon volumes.

No.	Japanese release date	Japanese ISBN
1	March 28, 1994	4-88-475705-X
1. "Human Sacrifice" (人柱, Hitobashira); 2. "Tobiume" (飛び梅); 3. "Susanoo-no-Mikoto" (荒魂スサノオ, Ara-Mitama Susanoo); 4. "First Defeat" (初めての敗北, Hajimete no Haiboku); 5. "Transformation" (変身, Henshin); 6. "Momiji" (紅葉); 7. "Assassin from Kaede" (楓からの刺客, Kaede kara no Shikaku); 8. "Disgrace" (気涸れ（穢れ）, Kegare)
2	December 16, 1995	4-81-245004-7
9. "Yin and Yang" (陰と陽, In to Yō); 10. "Cornered" (絶体絶命, Zettai Zetsumei); 11. "Contact with the Destroyer - Part 1" (破壊神との接触 その１, Hakai-shin to no Sesshoku Sono Ichi); 12. "Contact with the Destroyer - Part 2" (破壊神との接触 その２, Hakai-shin to no Sesshoku Sono Ni); 13. "I Only Want to Ask One Thing" (ひとつだけ聞きたい, Hitotsu Dake Kikitai); 14. "That Day" (あの日, Ano Hi); 15. "Retaliation" (反撃, Hangeki); 16. "Retreat" (撤収, Tesshū); 17. "Feast" (まつり, Matsuri)

=== Episodes ===
==== Blue Seed ====
No.	Title	Directed by	Written by	Original release date	English air date
1	"Princess Kushinada"; Transliteration: "Kushinada-hime" (Japanese: 奇稲田姫)	Jun Kamiya	Masaharu Amiya	October 5, 1994	November 6, 1999
2	"It's Cruel! It's Mysterious! It's My Destiny!!"; Transliteration: "Nazo desu! Koku desu! Watashi no Unmei!!" (Japanese: 謎です! 酷です! 私の運命!!)	Jun Kamiya	Masaharu Amiya; Naruhisa Arakawa	October 12, 1994	November 6, 1999
3	"It's Spring! It's the Capital! I'll Do My Best!!"; Transliteration: "Haru desu! Shuto desu! Ganbaranakucha!!" (Japanese: 春です! 首都です! 頑張らなくちゃ!!)	Takao Kato	Naruhisa Arakawa	October 19, 1994	November 13, 1999
4	"More Bad Luck! Why Does This Always Happen to Me?!"; Transliteration: "Dōshite? Saiaku! Watashi wa Daikyō?!" (Japanese: どーして? サイアク! 私は大凶?!)	Hideaki Hisashi	Naruhisa Arakawa	October 26, 1994	November 13, 1999
5	"Surprise! She's the Mother of Science!!"; Transliteration: "Odoroki! Matsu no Ki! Kagaku na Mama desu!!" (Japanese: オドロキ! 松の木! 科学なママです!!)	Kiyoshi Murayama	Aoba Fujimiya	November 2, 1994	November 20, 1999
6	"Complicated and Hard to Understand! Being a Man Puts You Into Such a Difficult Position?!"; Transliteration: "Fukuzatsu! Nankai! Otoko wa Tsurai ne?!" (Japanese: フクザツ! 難解! 男はつらいね?!)	Daisuke Chiba	Yoshimasa Takahashi	November 9, 1994	November 20, 1999
7	"I'm Fired Up! I'll Do It! Because I'm the Kushinada!!"; Transliteration: "Moemasu! Yarimasu! Kushinada da mon!!" (Japanese: 燃えます! やります! 奇稲田だもん!!)	Takao Kato	Naruhisa Arakawa	November 16, 1994	November 27, 1999
8	"What? How Strange! A Rival Appears?!"; Transliteration: "Nan nano! Henna no Raibaru Tōjō?!" (Japanese: 何なの! 変なの ライバル登場?!)	Kiyoshi Murayama	Naruhisa Arakawa	November 23, 1994	November 27, 1999
9	"Are You Serious?! Is This a Dream?! An Exciting Date!!"; Transliteration: "Maji nano?! Yume nano?! Dokidoki Dēto" (Japanese: マジなの?! 夢なの?! ドキドキデート!!)	Shinya Sadamitsu	Masaharu Amiya	November 30, 1994	December 4, 1999
10	"Innocence! Love! My First Kiss?!"; Transliteration: "Jun desu! Ai desu! Fāsutokissu?!" (Japanese: 純です! 愛です! ファーストキッス?!)	Hideaki Hisashi	Kenichi Araki	December 7, 1994	December 4, 1999
11	"Irritating! Jealous?! Unbelievable!!"; Transliteration: "Yakimoki! Yakimochi?! Anbirībabō!!" (Japanese: ヤキモキ! ヤキモチ?! アンビリーバボー!!)	Takao Kato	Yoshimasa Takahashi	December 14, 1994	December 11, 1999
12	"Can You Feel It?! I Can't Ignore It! An Ominous Premonition of Catastrophe!!"; Transliteration: "Kanjiru?! Kininaru! Hakyoku no Yokan!!" (Japanese: 感じる?! 気になる! 破局の予感!!)	Shinya Sadamitsu	Ryōe Tsukimura	December 21, 1994	December 11, 1999
13	"I Love You! This is so Extreme! It's Time to Confess?!"; Transliteration: "Suki desu! Kyūkyoku! Kokuhaku Taimu?!" (Japanese: 好きです! 究極! 告白タイム?!)	Kiyoshi Murayama	Yuzo Takada	December 28, 1994	December 18, 1999
14	"A Chase Down Yamato Highway! Love Under Fire!!"; Transliteration: "Oimasu! Yamato-ji! Koi no Midareuchi!!" (Japanese: 追います! 大和路! 恋の乱れ撃ち!!)	Takao Kato	Naruhisa Arakawa	January 4, 1995	December 18, 1999
15	"Lost & Trembling on a Trip to Michinoku"; Transliteration: "Tomadoi Yurameki Michinoku Kikō" (Japanese: 戸惑い ゆらめき みちのく紀行)	Kenji Takemura	Yoshimasa Takahashi	January 11, 1995	December 25, 1999
16	"Japan is a Paradise, Tears in Wakasa"; Transliteration: "Yamato yo Mahoroba Nageki no Wakasa" (Japanese: 日本(やまと)よ まほろば 嘆きの若狭)	Shinya Sadamitsu	Kenichi Araki	January 18, 1995	December 25, 1999
17	"Let it Bloom Japan! A Blizzard of One-sided Love!!"; Transliteration: "Sakasete! Nihon! Katakoi Fubuki! !" (Japanese: 咲かせて! 日本! 片恋吹雪!!)	Takao Kato	Naruhisa Arakawa	January 25, 1995	January 1, 2000
18	"Geez!! Oh, Man!! Sakura's Not Good Enough!?"; Transliteration: "Jīzasu!! Gaddemu!! Sakura wa Mijuku?!" (Japanese: ジーザス!! ガッデム!! 桜は未熟?!)	Hideaki Hisashi	Yuzo Takada	February 1, 1995	January 1, 2000
19	"Heat Haze! Start on a Journey! Love, I Won't be Far From You!"; Transliteration: "Kagerō Tabidachi Ai, hanarenai!" (Japanese: 陽炎 旅立ち 愛、離れない!)	Kenji Takemura	Ryōe Tsukimura	February 8, 1995	January 8, 2000
20	"I'm Home! Izumo! The Prologue of Hope!!"; Transliteration: "Tadaima! Furusato! Kibō no Joshō!!" (Japanese: ただいま! 出雲(ふるさと)! 希望の序章!!)	Shinya Sadamitsu	Masaharu Amiya; Naruhisa Arakawa	February 15, 1995	January 8, 2000
21	"Goodbye? No Way! Separation with Tears?!"; Transliteration: "Sayonara? Iya desu! Namida no Wakare?!" (Japanese: さよなら? いやです! 涙のわかれ?!)	Hideaki Hisashi	Masaharu Amiya	February 22, 1995	January 15, 2000
22	"Sadness, Fate, Momiji Kushinada"; Transliteration: "Kanashimi Unmei Kushinada Momiji" (Japanese: 悲しみ 運命 奇稲田紅葉)	Kenji Takemura	Naruhisa Arakawa	March 1, 1995	January 15, 2000
23	"Meeting Again, Starting the Journey, I Won't Give Up!"; Transliteration: "Saikai Tabidachi Watashi Makenai!" (Japanese: 再会 出発(たびだち) 私負けないっ!)	Shinya Sadamitsu	Naruhisa Arakawa	March 8, 1995	January 22, 2000
24	"The Setting Sun, the Coming Day, a Private Time for Each One"; Transliteration: "Shizumu Hi Semaru Hi Sorezore no Toki" (Japanese: 沈む陽 迫る日 それぞれの時)	Takao Kato	Naruhisa Arakawa	March 15, 1995	January 22, 2000
25	"All or Nothing! Decision! My Fate!"; Transliteration: "Kakemasu! Kimemasu! Watashi no Unmei!!" (Japanese: 賭けます! 決めます! 私の運命!!)	Shinya Sadamitsu	Naruhisa Arakawa	March 22, 1995	January 29, 2000
26	"New Soul"; Transliteration: "Aratama" (Japanese: 新魂(あらたま))	Jun Kamiya	Naruhisa Arakawa	March 29, 1995	January 29, 2000

==== Blue Seed 2 ====
No.	Title	Written by	Original release date
1	"Mission: Eradicate Kushinada, Operation MITAMA PHASE 1"; Transliteration: "Kushinada Fūmetsu Sakusen Operation MITAMA PHASE 1" (Japanese: 奇稲田封滅作戦 Operation MITAMA PHASE 1)	Naruhisa Arakawa	July 24, 1996
2	"Mission: Eradicate Kushinada, Operation MITAMA PHASE 2"; Transliteration: "Kushinada Fūmetsu Sakusen Operation MITAMA PHASE 2" (Japanese: 奇稲田封滅作戦 Operation MITAMA PHASE 2)	Naruhisa Arakawa	August 21, 1996
3	"Six Babes on a Trip, Big Explosion in a Secret Hotspring"; Transliteration: "Bijin OL Rokunin Tabi Hitō Daibakuha" (Japanese: 美人OL6人旅 秘湯大爆破)	Kiyoshi Murayama	February 4, 1998

=== Production ===
Blue Seed was jointly produced by Production I.G and Ashi Productions. The two teams alternated episodes (for example, episodes 1 and 2 were produced by Production I.G, while episode 3 was produced by Ashi Productions), an arrangement which fostered competition between them.

=== Music ===
Apart from the opening and ending themes and "Shinshin o Tobikoete" (星を飛び越えて; 'Leaping Over the Stars') (the song sung as a competitive duet by Momiji and Sakura in episode 8), the music for the TV series was composed by Kenji Kawai. Most of the themes were composed to accompany scenes in the first three episodes, though some ended up not being used in the scene they were written for and debuted in later episodes instead. The music for the later episodes used a combination of these unused themes, some new themes, and repurposed themes from the first three episodes, often with new arrangements that drastically changed the tone of the music. The TAC's theme, "Otomegokoro ga Moeru Toki" (乙女心が燃えるとき; 'When a Maiden's Heart Burns'), was especially popular with fans of the series.

"Shinshin o Tobikoete" originated as 'No No Pessimist', the theme song for the never-released Popful Mail OVA. Megumi Hayashibara, the Japanese voice actor for Momiji, wrote new lyrics and retitled the song, recording it for her 1994 album Sphere and then re-recording it as a duet for episode 8 of Blue Seed. Hayashibara also sang and wrote the lyrics for 'Touch and Go!!', the ending theme of Blue Seed.

Two soundtrack albums were released by King Records on its Star Child label, Blue Seed Ongakuhen Vol.1 (Blue Seed 音楽 Vol. 1) (1994) and Blue Seed Ongakuhen Vol.2 (Blue Seed 音楽 Vol. 2) (1995). In addition, ADV Music released a collection of J-pop songs sung by members of the show's Japanese voice cast under the title Blue Seed.

Opening

- Carnival Babel by Takada Band (Fumihiko Tachiki and Ami Mimatsu) (remade by Megumi Hayashibara as "Carnival Babel 2003 ver." also known as "Carnival Babel Revival")

Ending

- Touch and Go!! by Megumi Hayashibara
- Life by Megumi Hayashibara (Ep. 26)

=== Video game ===
A role-playing video game entitled Blue Seed: Kushinadahirokuden (ブルーシード 奇稲田秘録伝, Burūshīdo Kushinada Hirokuden; lit. 'Blue Seed: The Secret Records of Kushinada') was released by Sega for the Sega Saturn on June 23, 1995. It follows an adventure format, and utilizes a card-based battle system. The game's story is not an adaption of either the manga or the TV series, but a set of original episodes set in the same continuity as the TV series. The main cast of the TV series reprised their roles for the battle sequences and introductory cutscene.

The game was one of 12 Sega Saturn games announced when the system was first unveiled at the 1994 Tokyo Toy Show.

On release, Famicom Tsūshin scored the game a 28 out of 40.

Preceded by Tottemo! Luckyman (April 6, 1994 – September 28, 1994)	TV Tokyo Wednesday 18:00 timeslot Blue Seed (October 5, 1994 – March 29, 1995)	Succeeded by Legend of the Angel of Love: Wedding Peach (April 5, 1995 – March 27, 1996)
