= Burn Up! =

1991 original video animation

- ADV Film DVD cover
- Genre: Comedy, girls with guns, science fiction
- Created by: Yasunori Ide; Jun Kanzaki
- Original video animation
- Directed by: Yasunori Ide
- Produced by: Akio Matsuda; Tōru Miura
- Written by: Jun Kanzaki
- Music by: Kenji Kawai
- Studio: AIC
- Licensed by: NA: AnimEigo Sentai Filmworks
- Released: March 21, 1991
- Runtime: 50 minutes
- Related
- Burn-Up W; Burn-Up Excess; Burn-Up Scramble

Burn Up! is a 1991 Japanese anime original video animation. It concerns a special group of police officers called Team Warrior who are often given special assignments in the police department.

In North America, AnimEigo first released Burn Up! on VHS in 1992 in Japanese with English subtitles. An English dub of the OVA was produced in 1994 by ADV Films, and was released on VHS that year. In 2005, ADV Films released the OVA on DVD. The DVD also contains the English dub. In 2009, Sentai Filmworks re-released the OVA on DVD.

== Plot ==
Police Officers Maki, Reimi and Yuka are stuck on traffic patrol when they would prefer to be involved in more "exciting" police duties. All that changes when they join in a police chase after a kidnapped girl. As a result, they become involved in the case of a white slavery organization run by the politically connected businessman Samuel McCoy.

The three decide to scope out a night club to see if they can catch the kidnappers in the act. While consoling a girl who said she was stood up by her boyfriend, Yuka is kidnapped by McCoy's men. Maki and Reimi try to rescue her, but are beaten and poisoned by Gonnack. After they receive an antidote at the hospital, Maki and Kenji plead with the chief for permission to prosecute McCoy and save Yuka, but are denied. Frustrated by the inaction, Maki and Reimi take what they need from the police armory, including a police assault carrier, and raid McCoy's compound whilst creating mayhem in their wake.

After rescuing Yuka and all the other enslaved girls, Maki and Reimi go after McCoy. Their mission is thwarted when Sayaka (who was the girl at the club), pretends to be another slave, but then shoots and incapacitates them both. McCoy reveals himself and he and his men torture Maki and Reimi, but they are saved when Kenji, Banba and the rest of the police force come to rescue them.

In a post-credits scene, Yuka visits Maki and Reimi in recovery, asking when they can go back on active duty, but then states she was kidding.

== Background ==
There are three series that are remake/reboot to Burn Up. Two of the series, Burn Up W (4 episodes) and sequel Burn Up Excess (13 episodes) form a mostly united story arc. Many of the characters in Burn Up also appear in Excess, but have different names. The third series, Burn Up Scramble!, is unrelated to the other 2 series, except that it is a complete re-envisioning of the series.

== Characters ==
=== Police Characters ===
Maki
Voiced by: Yumiko Shibata (Japanese); Tiffany Grant (English)
The main character, a blonde bombshell who always takes control of a fight. Reacts with burning ferocity when hit on by would-be suitors, but then is chagrined, left wondering why more guys don't dig her and will still only show affection to those who have status or money.
Reimi
Voiced by: Miki Itou (Japanese); Amanda Winn (English)
Maki's friend and coworker. She has black hair and loves her electronic devices to the point of entering violent rage if they should ever become damaged.
Yuka
Voiced by: Kumiko Nishihara (Japanese); Kimberly Yates (English)
A pink haired cutie who's the computer expert of the group.
Kenji Asada
Voiced by: Hirokazu Hiramatsu (Japanese); Milton Lawrence (English)
The male of Team Warrior and the leader. He's in a romantic relationship with Maki.
Banba
Voiced by: Shoichiro Akaboshi (Japanese); Don Huffman (English)
Banba is a black male police officer of the precinct that is after Samuel McCoy. He is a dedicated officer, and an ace marksman whose accurate shooting skills prevent the criminal Samuel McCoy from escaping his own mansion during the police siege. He is intelligent, relays facts accurately and with careful research. He is partnered with fellow police officer Kenji, and acts towards his job with discipline and professionalism.

=== Other characters ===
Samuel McCoy
Voiced by: Norio Wakamoto (Japanese); Aaron Krohn (English)
Leader of the McCoy gang, which has been capturing young girls, brainwashing them, then selling them as slaves to perverted, rich clients.
Sayaka
Voiced by: Yuri Shiratori (Japanese); Renee Foresman (English)
A young girl who works for McCoy, possibly his lover. Tricks Yuka and many of McCoy's other victims into being captured. She is completely indifferent to the suffering that McCoy and his henchmen subject the abducted young girls to.
Ryuji
Voiced by: Hideyuki Umezu (Japanese); Henry Pinter (English)
Henchman in the McCoy gang, and chief interrogator. Tortures Yuka and tries to get her to reveal her intentions toward investigating the club.
Gonnack
Voiced by: Kiyoyuki Yanada
McCoy's bodyguard, and suspected assassin. Very strong, not very bright, but very very quick.

== Summary ==
Maki is sitting in a park next to her motorcycle, in her racing suit. As she sits there, feeding pigeons, we cut away to a frantic highway chase with a young girl screaming in the backseat of the getaway car. Police dispatches a signal to all possible backup units, including two Junior SWAT team officers: Yuka and Remi. Preempting the speeding ticket they were about to issue, they join the pursuit and radio Maki for assistance. She suits up and enters the fray on her motorcycle, taking shortcuts over guardrails and weaving through police roadblocks. When the perpetrators open fire on her, cracking her racing helmet, she promptly becomes angered and draws a shotgun, kills one of the kidnappers, shoots the getaway car's engine, and the chase grinds to a halt.

At a police debriefing, which Kenji and his partner Banba are attending, it is revealed that the kidnappers could have connections to Samuel McCoy. Amidst rumors that his profitable chain of nightclubs and restaurants is a front for a lucrative prostitution and sex slave ring, it has been impossible until now to find any hard evidence. Kenji and Banba are ordered to interrogate the prisoner and get "something that'll stick on McCoy's Teflon ass".

During a brief stop into the office where Maki is filing her incident report, Kenji sets up a date with Maki, and informing them of the pending case against McCoy. The news on McCoy, naturally, disgusts the three girls, but is quickly forgotten amidst Kenji and Maki's flirting, drawing up envy among the girls.

This date, however, is later interrupted by Banba bringing late news about the case. Despite Maki and Kenji's chagrin upon being interrupted at a very awkward moment (Maki wrapped in a towel after a shower and Kenji was in his briefs), they listen as he tells them they have had many sightings of missing women at one of McCoy's clubs, the Sartrait 7. Kenji declares it too dangerous, and outright forbids Maki to investigate. Date terminally interrupted, Maki brings Kenji back to the station to question the prisoner.

However, when Kenji goes to interrogate the captured kidnapper, as ordered, he is shocked to find the man dead in his cell, poison needles peppering his body. This prompts the team to, reluctantly, investigate their only remaining lead, the Sartrait 7.

While mingling with the crowd, Yuka stumbles upon a lonely, sad-looking girl in a frilly yellow dress, and goes to befriend her. The girl sobbingly confides that she was expecting her boyfriend, but has been stood up. Yuka offers to keep her company, keeping her safe and attempting to pick up her spirits by buying her a soft drink. However, at the vending machine, she is attacked from behind and subdued by a muscular thug, with the frilly yellow-dressed girl suspiciously acquiescent.

The thug is followed by Remi and Maki, who draw weapons and hold up the kidnappers. All goes well, until a muscular figure sweeps out of the shadows, with dark, almost slate-gray skin and long red hair. with shocking agility for a man his size, he leaps away from their every attack, throwing a hail of poison needles -the same as that which killed their prisoner- at them, knocking the girls unconscious.

At the hospital, the poison is neutralized and their wounds treated, and Kenji comes to tell them that they can't officially investigate the kidnapping of Yuka at McCoy's club, due to the lack of evidence. Even the presence of the red-haired killer -identified as Gonnack, McCoy's bodyguard and suspected assassin- isn't enough to issue a warrant on McCoy.

Maki decides she's going to take matters into her own hands, using her Junior SWAT clearance to take what she needs from the armory, behind the chief's back. Remi reluctantly assists, and rigs an alarm to distract the security in the police garage. They steal a police assault carrier and make for McCoy's mansion.

Meanwhile, Yuka is imprisoned in McCoy's basement, awakening in a cell with three other young women. Here, they sobbingly confirm that they are being groomed to be sex slaves to be sold off to the wealthy, with compliance or suicide the only possible escape.

Eventually, Maki and Remi learn the girls' location, and break Yuka and her cellmates out. Ordering the unarmed Yuka to lead the girls to safety, Maki and Remi press on to arrest McCoy. The women are waylaid, however, by an apparently panicked Sayaka, who runs into them in the hallway as she and McCoy try to escape the besieged compound. While she has them off guard, McCoy and Ryuji draw weapons and fire, wounding the two officers.

Meanwhile, the SWAT reinforcements arrive, and Kenji himself appears in a helicopter, tracking the girls' location. He and Banba sneak in behind McCoy through a skylight, killing Ryuji and surrounding and arresting McCoy. He rescues Maki and Remi and, as she says herself upon fade out, "that's that."

Later, after the credits roll, Yuka visits Remi and Maki in the hospital and inquires as to when they would like to return to Sartrait 7. Both officers nearly fall out of their beds from the shock, leading Yuka to claim she was only joking.
