= DirecTV Japan =

Defunct Japanese satellite television company

- Type: Subsidiary
- Industry: Multichannel video programming distributor
- Founded: December 1, 1997; 28 years ago
- Defunct: 2000
- Headquarters: Ibaraki, Japan
- Areas served: Japan
- Products: Direct-broadcast satellite; Pay television; Pay-per-view
- Owner: Hughes Electronics (42.5%); Culture Convenience Club (42.5%); Space Communications Corporation (10%); Dai Nippon Printing Co. Ltd. (5%)
- Parent: DirecTV

DirecTV Japan (ディレクTV) was the Japanese subsidiary of the Hughes Electronics-owned American satellite television company DirecTV. The service existed between 1997 and 2000 and was later merged with SKY PerfecTV!.

== History ==
Hughes Communications began planning a Japanese DirecTV service in September 1995, with local partners Culture Convenience Club (CCC), Space Communications Corporation (SCC) and Dai Nippon Printing Co. Ltd. (DNP). Hughes and CCC held 42.5% each, SCC, 10% and DNP, 5%. The companies involved planned launching a digital satellite service with over 50 video and audio channels, without planning a launch date for the time being. By March 1996, Osaka-based Matsushita Electric eyed the possibility of gaining a 10% stake. At the time, coinciding with Star TV's entrance to the Japanese market, the DirecTV plans were increased to 100 channels. It was expected that its services would start by year-end 1996 or early 1997.

In October 1996, the company was formally established, with an estimated launch date set for fall 1997, and with Gareth Chang as its chairman. Its pay-per-view services and the capability of having up to 100 channels would help it stand out from its rival satellite operators. In February 1997, Matsushita signed a US$13.7 million contract with General Instruments subsidiary Magnitude Compression Systems to provide digital encoding systems for the service. The company's broadcast center was located in Ibaraki Prefecture and was built by Nakano Corporationwhile its equipment was ordered by Sony. The company attended MIPTV 1997 in Cannes in April in order to negotiate foreign companies to provide their channels to the service. Interested parties included NBC Asia, BET International and French channel MCM. In June, Tokuma Shoten bought a 10% equity stake, to counter PerfecTV!'s launch of an all-animation channel in September, the local version of Cartoon Network. "Serious discussions" with a yet-unnamed terrestrial broadcaster (which was believed to be Nippon Television) were underway. In October, a December 1 launch date was announced. The provider announced 63 channels, with plans to increase to 90 by spring 1998, down from 91, which was the result of the withdrawal of the application of a content provider for the service. The company did not have any specific subscription goals at launch. Its basic package was 10-20% cheaper than PerfecTV!'s equivalent. Among the new channels was the Latin American music channel HTV. The Japan Classic Programming Network was added to DirecTV in early December, airing reruns of "traditional" programming (samurai and historical dramas), a niche that had a footprint on subscription television, with launch rights to 511 series.

In February 1998, Orix Corporation invested 200 million yen in the service. On April 1, 1998 (the beginning of fiscal 1998), DirecTV added 25 new video channels and 29 new audio channels. The new channels included BBC World, NBC Asia, ESPN, Discovery Channel, Playboy and MTV. The audio channels were in CD quality. In terms of sports programming, the provider offered over 600 of the 810 professional baseball matches held in Japan, as well as 240 out of 308 J.League matches and two premier cups. Subscription figures were still relatively low: by May 1998, it had claimed 109,000 subscribers, partly due to the Asian economic crisis, which prevented the launch of DirecTV in India and Indonesia. This undermined its launch campaign featuring US actor Arnold Schwarzenegger, costing millions of dollars. The company hoped to increase its subscriber base if the economic situation improved. One of its backers, Culture Convenience Club Tsutaya, had difficulties in enlisting subscribers. By June, its number of subscribers had increased to 140,000. Plans for an InteracTV datacast service, as well as new channels from fall 1998, were on the cards. In July, it signed an agreement with Viacom to launch a localized Japanese Nickelodeon channel, which was going to be carried as an exclusive channel.

On October 1, a new agreement with JVC was signed for the provision of headend equipment. The company planned increasing its offer to 150 channels by the end of the year.

Larry Hunter became its president on February 5, 1999, coinciding with Tsutaya selling 17% of its shares. The subscriber base as of March 1999 stood at 249,800.

Multi-year pay-per-view agreements were signed with Warner Bros. in September 1998, MGM in March 1999 and DreamWorks in November 1999.

In order to increase its number of subscribers, DirecTV announced that it would change to a new satellite during the summer of 2000. The new beam would be in the same position as the Japanese BS (broadcasting satellite) system. CS (communication satellite) and BS satellites require different dishes and different systems. For this end, DirecTV started raising 30 billion yen in convertible bonds. The bonds were issued the following month, this time at 31 billion yen, with short-term plans at releasing new 7 billion bonds. By January 2000, DirecTV had more than 400,000 subscribers.

== Closure ==
On February 28, 2000, SKY PerfecTV! announced the acquisition of DirecTV's subscriber base, due to the provider's difficulty in increasing its number of subscribers. The following day, DirecTV agreed to disband its Japanese operations in order to finish the deal, which would involve the liquidation of the Japanese company. On March 2, when Hughes approved the dissolution, DirecTV would continue providing minimum services by year-end 2000 and that it would offer SKY PerfecTV! sets to existing DirecTV subscribers at no cost.
