= Sakura Wars (1996 video game) =

1996 video game

- Saturn box art, featuring protagonist Sakura Shinguji
- Developers: Red Company; Sega CS2 R&D (Note: Ported to the Dreamcast by M2 in cooperation with Sega.)
- Publishers: JP: Sega; RU: Akella; CN: Dysin Interactive
- Directors: Tomoyuki Ito; Yasushi Takeuchi
- Producers: Yoji Ishii; Noriyoshi Ohba; Tatsuo Yamada
- Programmer: Shuichi Katagi
- Artists: Kōsuke Fujishima; Hidenori Matsubara
- Writer: Satoru Akahori
- Composer: Kohei Tanaka
- Series: Sakura Wars
- Platforms: Sega Saturn, Dreamcast, Windows, mobile phone, PlayStation Portable
- Release: September 27, 1996: Saturn; JP: September 27, 1996 Dreamcast; JP: May 25, 2000 Windows; JP: August 18, 2000; JP: March 20, 2003 (Windows XP); JP: January 25, 2007 (PC-DVD); RUS: January 11, 2006 PlayStation Portable; JP: March 9, 2006
- Genres: Tactical role-playing, dating sim, visual novel
- Mode: Single-player

Sakura Wars (Note: Japanese: サクラ大戦, Hepburn: Sakura Taisen) is a cross-genre video game developed by Sega and Red Company and published by Sega in 1996. It is the first installment in the Sakura Wars series, created by Oji Hiroi. Originally released for the Sega Saturn, it was later ported to other systems including the Dreamcast, and had a remake for the PlayStation 2. Defined by Sega as a "dramatic adventure" game, Sakura Wars combines overlapping tactical role-playing, dating sim, and visual novel gameplay elements.

Set in a fictionalized version of 1923 in the Taishō era, the game follows the exploits of the Imperial Combat Revue, a military unit dedicated to fighting supernatural threats against Tokyo while maintaining their cover as a theater troupe. Imperial Japanese Navy Ensign Ichiro Ogami is assigned leader of its all-female Flower Division, a group of women with magical abilities that defend Tokyo against demon attacks using steam-powered armor called Kobus. He becomes embroiled in both the group's latest conflict with the Hive of Darkness and the personal lives of its members.

Hiroi created the concept for what would become Sakura Wars in 1990. In 1993, his small team in the Planning Department of Red Company began elaborating on his concept, with full development beginning the following year after being approved by Sega. Several prominent figures were brought on board the project including writer Satoru Akahori, composer Kohei Tanaka, and character designer Kōsuke Fujishima. Although the game was only published in Japan, an English-language fan translation was released in 2019. The game was a critical and commercial success, becoming one of the highest-selling titles for the Saturn, and spawned many successful sequels and supplementary titles in the form of the Sakura Wars series. A direct sequel, Sakura Wars 2: Thou Shalt Not Die, was released in 1998.

== Gameplay ==
The two main gameplay modes of Sakura Wars are social interaction with characters using LIPS, and turn-based strategic battles directly influenced by LIPS interactions.

Sakura Wars is a cross-genre video game in which the player controls Ichiro Ogami and the all-female Flower Division of the Imperial Combat Revue, who must save Tokyo from the Hive of Darkness. Dubbed a "dramatic adventure" game and taking place across 10 episodes, the gameplay segments incorporate tactical role-playing, dating sim, and visual novel elements. It has two gameplay modes: an adventure mode and a battle mode. The adventure mode is divided between periods where Ogami navigates the Grand Imperial Theater and interacts with various characters, while the battle mode is governed by a turn-based battle system on a tilted grid-based battlefield. Progress is saved at the end of each episode, and the player may also save the game during intermissions.

In the adventure mode, Ogami navigates the theater during limited time sequences between battles. This game introduces the Live & Interactive Picture System (LIPS). When Ogami is faced with critical choices during conversations with both members of the Flower Division and supporting characters within the combat revue, dialogue trees are displayed with a time limit for the player to input. Depending on the type of response, the character may respond positively or negatively, impacting their relationship with Ogami and future interactions. Other actions within LIPS include holding the cursor over parts of a character's portrait to trigger internal monologues and varying responses from the characters. Each main heroine has different personality quirks that must be taken into consideration while talking with them, with correct responses raising their "Trust".

In the battle mode, the Flower Division fights demons using machines called Kobus. Each unit has its own turn, with each turn allowing two actions. These actions include "Attack", "Defend", "Move", "Deathblow" (a critical strike that can kill a normal enemy in one hit), Charge (store energy for a more powerful action during the next turn), and Heal (which restores health points (HP) to a chosen unit). Different units specialize in different skills such as support actions, melee attacks, or ranged attacks. Units have varying movement abilities based on available space and unit statistics, as well as a separate attack range based on their weapon type. Actions taken during LIPS sequences with members of the Flower Division directly impact battles; raised trust during LIPS segments grant statistic increases and subsequently improve combat ability. The game ends when certain conditions, such as winning a battle, are not met or if the HP on Ogami's Kobu reaches zero, although the player can continue by selecting "Rematch". The game also contains animated cutscenes and musical numbers.

== Synopsis ==
In 1923, Imperial Japanese Navy Ensign Ichiro Ogami is transferred to the Imperial Combat Revue, a secret combat unit based in Tokyo. Meanwhile, swordswoman Sakura Shinguji arrives from Sendai as the Assault Force's latest recruit and meets Ogami at Ueno Park. Traveling to the Grand Imperial Theater together, Ogami meets the team's main actresses: Sumire Kanzaki, Maria Tachibana, Iris Chateaubriand, Kanna Kirishima, and Kohran Ri. The theater's manager Ikki Yoneda tells Ogami he has been assigned as an usher. Initially bemused and hurt by his assignment, it turns out to be a bluff to decide his worth. The Imperial Combat Revue also functions as a theater troupe called the Imperial Revue. Central to the unit is the Flower Division, the Imperial Revue's main actresses, who use their spirit powers to defend Tokyo against demon attacks using steam-powered armor called Kobu.

The current wave of attacks is being controlled by the Hive of Darkness, a group of black magicians led by Tenkai and his powerful subordinates the Lords of Death. Tenkai's goal is to restore the shogunate and banish the growing Western influences from Japan, with the Hive of Darkness destroying magical seals around Tokyo that keep a powerful demonic horde at bay. As the Flower Division battles the Hive of Darkness, each member must confront their personal problems to function as an effective combat unit. Ogami also becomes involved in the running of the theater and is witness to on-stage incidents including Sakura bringing down the stage during one performance through her clumsiness, and Kanna and Sumire clashing on stage during another.

The Flower Division are unsuccessful in preventing the Hive of Darkness from destroying the seals, allowing Tenkai to summon a magical fortress from which he intends to conquer Japan. The Flower Division storm the fortress and destroy Tenkai and the fortress. During these events, Ogami becomes close to each member and can pursue a romantic relationship. The city recovers as the group relaxes, but a surviving Hive of Darkness member Kuroki Satan launches a fresh attack, renaming himself "Aoi Satan". He is actually Shinnosuke Yamazaki, a former comrade of Yoneda who was presumed killed with Sakura's father Kazuma when creating the original seals. Yamazaki survived and was possessed by the true Satan, being responsible for controlling the demons and resurrecting Tenkai.

Yoneda's deputy, Ayame Fujieda, is turned into a demon using her suppressed feelings for Ogami. Satan summons a great fortress called the Seima Castle from the sea near Tokyo, intent on releasing the population of Hell to overrun humanity. Using the airship Mikasa, the Imperial Combat Revue launch a concentrated attack on the castle. They successfully unite their spiritual power to banish Satan back to Hell. Ayame's demon form is destroyed at the cost of her life, and after bidding farewell she ascends to Heaven as an angel named Michael. After Aoi Satan's defeat, the final scene varies depending on whether Ogami romanced a member of the Flower Division and which member he chose.

== Production ==
=== Concept and development ===
Oji Hiroi created the concept for what would become Sakura Wars in 1990. He saw a Japanese stage production of the play Shanghai Rhapsody and was impressed by the spectacle of the acting troop he saw on stage. In 1993, Hiroi and anime composer Kohei Tanaka worked together on an original video animation (OVA) adaptation of the video game Tengai Makyou: Ziria. Hiroi was highly impressed by Tanaka's music, to the point where he wanted him to create a musical set to it. This concept evolved into his wish for Tanaka to score a video game focused on the theater. Later in 1993, a small team in the Planning Department of Red Company (now Red Entertainment) led by Hiroi began promoting his concept and planning the game's basic concepts. At this stage, the project was titled "Sakura" (桜) to connect it with Japan. It was described as an "example plan" rather than a practical project. While distinct from the final Sakura Wars the proposal shared an alternate historical setting with steampunk technology, a female lead and mecha combat. In addition to Hiroi, the team included Ryoma Kaneko and Naoki Morita, who would later work on Sakura Wars proper. While developing the "Sakura" proposal, Hiroi and his team created two tabletop role-playing games dubbed "Sakura 1" and "Sakura 2". This resulted in the strategy elements almost overriding the game's other aspects. Inspired by the combination of tactical combat and the story used in the Fire Emblem series, Hiroi steered the project more in that direction. Influences from contemporary anime were also added to bring depth to the story and characters. With the basic elements defined, the team continued refining the project for between half a year and a year. Convinced of the project's potential to become a video game, Hiroi presented "Sakura" to multiple game companies, but none of them had confidence in the project. Despite his determination to see the project realized, Hiroi put the project aside with no expectation that it would be produced.

In 1994, following Hiroi's decision to put Sakura aside, Shoichiro Irimajiri—then vice president of Sega—contacted him about the possibility of developing a game with a popular mascot character for Sega's in-development Sega Saturn home console. Irimajiri wanted a unique video game property for the system and had heard positive feedback about Hiroi's work. Hiroi was initially reluctant but eventually accepted Irimajiri's offer, inviting him and other potential contributors to spend a fortnight's holiday in Saipan. Hiroi later said the decision to work on a game for the Saturn was a hard one, as he had previously worked on games for rival unspecified home console systems. It was Sega's favorable response to his pitch that persuaded him to develop Sakura Wars on the Saturn. Hiroi pitched his old concept for Sakura to Irimajiri during their stay on Saipan. While Hiroi harbored doubts as to whether such an ambitious and unusual project would be accepted, Irimajiri was convinced. On their return to Japan, Sega and Red Company began development on Hiroi's project. That October, it was given the title Sakura Wars. Due to problems trademarking the kanji version of Sakura because it is the native name for cherry blossom, the word "Sakura" was written in katakana instead.

The inclusion of adventure segments alongside the strategic simulation elements was contentious early on, with some fearing Sakura Wars would turn into a bishōjo game. The strategic segments were designed to feel like interactive anime battles, with everyone getting a chance to attack as in many anime fight sequences of the time. The wish for an anime style also came through in the adventure segments with LIPS, turning conversations into a kind of confrontation to be won. LIPS was born out of staff frustration with the adventure game tradition of time freezing while the player decided which response to select in a tense situation. By implementing a time limit, the team made Sakura Wars more interactive and removed this frustration. The "LIPS" name was chosen for its distinct sound rather than any special meaning. Full development of LIPS began after running a test using a scene where Ogami could choose whether to look inside a shower cubicle. The battle sequences were inspired by similar scenes found in the Kamen Rider and Ultraman television shows. The two shows' combat elements were actively referenced during the last battle with the combined final attack of the entire Flower Division. Each battle sequence was hand-crafted by one member of staff to simplify production. The game's "Trust" system was a means of incorporating simulation elements without utilizing role-playing elements such as experience points. The decision to remove experience points entirely proved controversial within the team. According to director Tomoyuki Ito, the process of creating "Trust" and associated systems was based on trial and error, mainly around how best to express it.

Development of Sakura Wars lasted for approximately three years—double the original estimate. Hiroi acted as the general producer, while Ito acted as a director. Buildup Entertainment and Neverland developed the computer-generated imagery (CGI) segments, and the anime cinematics were directed by Shunji Oga and produced by Sega-owned studio Kyokuichi Tokyo Movie (later TMS Entertainment). Sega initially outsourced programming to an unnamed external company. By 1995 it had already developed one or two chapters of the game's combat-based content before Hiroi objected to the direction the game was taking. It was becoming a generic simulation game that deviated from his vision. Red Company refused to continue development of the prototype, and it was removed from development. Sega's CS Research & Development No. 2 (CS2 R&D) division desired the game's completion, so they co-developed it with Red Company. The conflicting gameplay elements needed to be divided between different teams within CS2 R&D, only bringing the two parts together at the end of development. Because of this development technique, none of the elements could be effectively tested until the game was close to completion. As a result of these difficulties, the Sega team found production difficult. Sega stated that Sakura Wars was their most expensive video game production to date, although no exact budget was given.

=== Art design ===
The main cast of Sakura Wars as portrayed in later original video animation adaptations. Each character was designed around a particular theme, with battle outfits modelled on tuxedos.

Manga artist Kōsuke Fujishima, who at the time was working on the long-running manga series Oh My Goddess!, designed the main cast. Before Fujishima joined the project, the characters had placeholder designs created by Red Company staff. His editors resisted letting him do the designs due to his heavy workload, including his commitment to Oh My Goddess!. Sakura Wars was the first time Fujishima had worked with Sega or been associated with a Sega property. He was skeptical of the project because of the state it was in when he was first approached. It was in a very early stage of development and neither the story nor gameplay mechanics had been finalized. Red Company's placeholder character designs were in place at a time when it was uncertain whether Fujishima would join, but Hiroi was adamant he would be the character designer. Fujishima eventually joined the project in late 1994. His first design was for Sakura. The first sketches for Sakura moved Hiroi to tears and fully convinced both Red Company and Sega that Fujishima was the right designer. The positive reception to Fujishima's work, together with his understanding of the project's goals, helped raise staff morale for the entire project.

Fujishima was responsible for designing eight characters including Ogami and Sakura, along with formal and casual clothes, and accessories. Hidenori Matsubara designed the supporting cast and helped with general animation. Fujishima found it easy to design the characters as their concepts had been firmly established before he created the first drafts and moved on to the final designs. The designs were meant to communicate the characters' inner thoughts and had to be understandable for players. Due to the game's Taishō period setting, he needed to stop himself adding anachronistic elements like fasteners. Hiroi made detailed character sheets for Fujishima to use when designing the cast. An example was Sumire, whose personality was communicated through her clothes. Each character had distinct traits, such as a ponytail and hakama kimono for Sakura. Fujishima combined these elements with his own design ideas for the final artwork. The Taishō period meant he could combine traditional Japanese clothing with Western accessories such as shoes, allowing the female characters an otherwise improbable range of movement. His design for each main protagonist—from Ogami to the Flower Division members—directly mirrored Hiroi's concepts for them. The Flower Division's battle dress was modeled after the tuxedo, and Fujishima compared them with the costumes of the Takarazuka Revue.

Futoshi Nagata created the Kobu mecha designs, along with the game's CGI sequences. His initial design outline from Hiroi was the basic concept of using steampunk technology within the Taishō period. When designing the Kobu, Nagata was guided by Morita, who showed him photographs of both steam-powered trains and early deep-sea diving suits—specifically those made of spherical segments. Nagata did extensive research on the Second Industrial Revolution in the United Kingdom and consciously avoided the trope of anachronistic near-future technology while creating the designs. The concept of a diving suit was integrated into the concept for the Kobu being reinforced armor rather than robots. Its front was designed after the steam trains that ran on the Aji Express Line. For each Flower Division member's Kobu armor, Nagata designed them to mirror their traits and beauty so they would be unique. Since the Kobu were meant to be armor, they were not given faces. Because Nagata was brought on early in the game's production, he had considerable freedom when submitting and adjusting his designs. When the designs were finalized, Nagata began working full-time on CGI, finishing the first Kobu model in five days.

=== Scenario and characters ===
When Hiroi was creating the original concept for Sakura Wars, he had trouble picking the exact era in which the story would take place. He initially considered using the Shōwa period, with a focus on the post-war black market. He also considered setting it shortly before and during World War II. Hiroi eventually abandoned this idea as there was too much documentation about the Shōwa period making its use as a fantasy setting complicated. He next considered using the Meiji period, which was a time of turbulence after the fall of the isolationist Tokugawa Shogunate that saw Western Culture introduced into Japan. Hiroi also abandoned this idea as Meiji-era Japan could not allow for the "modern" feeling he wanted. With this in mind, Hiroi settled on using the Taishō period as the setting for Sakura Wars. The Taishō period involved Japan integrating Western culture into its own, allowing for political changes and the emancipation of women after a prolonged feudal period. In the original draft, the story was much darker, with a key event being the Great Kantō earthquake and the resultant breakdown of the Taishō period. This version was almost entirely discarded.

Hiroi wanted to create a version of the Taishō period where the social advances and freedoms the Japanese began exploring continued without being brought to an end by the Great Kantō earthquake and the subsequent shift to militarism before World War II. Another reason for using the Taishō period was the lack of documentation about it and Tokyo's development because the Great Kantō earthquake destroyed much of it. Originally Hiroi wanted to distinguish the Sakura Wars Taishō from the historical Taishō by modifying the kanji slightly. He did not do this because his staff wanted a world that blended real and fictional events. To further distinguish it, Hiroi made use of steampunk technology in the game's world. Despite it being a fantastic version of the Taishō period, Hiroi did his best to incorporate realistic elements. The world's general setting, while conceived by Hiroi, was further developed and fleshed out by Kaneko and Morita.

Author and screenwriter Satoru Akahori wrote the main script and branching storylines. Hiroi felt the script would lose entertainment value if he wrote it himself as the setting was based on family stories. He had previously worked with Akahori on other projects. When Akahori first heard the concept before talking with Hiroi he was highly skeptical, but Hiroi convinced him to come on board. When he was first pitched the project, all that had been finalized was that the story would involve young girls and mecha. Akahori was unsure how to approach the project as he had never written for a video game. Hiroi told him to write the story like an anime television series. When Akahori first joined the team, the story was still unfinished. The only points that had been finalized were its setting, the overall theme of steampunk mecha combat, and a cast of five or six characters. Akahori's early work was focused on expanding the narrative and characters based on Hiroi's draft. Due to the deep connection to Hiroi's family history, Akahori could not work on the script by himself and needed to consult frequently with Hiroi. Hiroi also insisted on making frequent changes if Akahori's work did not fall in line with his vision. Akahori wrote a thirteen-episode storyline for the game, with the final battle taking place across three episodes. After talks with staff, the final battle was condensed into a single chapter, bringing the game to its current ten-episode length. Kaneko and Morita created the additional dialogue around Akahori's main scenario, and worked on script editing and debugging.

Creating strong representative characters was part of Sega's request for a new mascot character for their Saturn system. A major element of the cast was taking advantage of the game's setting. It could allow for characters from countries outside Japan—like Russia and France—to be part of the Imperial Combat Revue. During early planning, Hiroi produced character concepts for the Flower Division, imitating character archetypes commonly found in high school manga. Using this inspiration, he created a gentle yet strong-willed woman (Sakura), a rival character with a negative first impression (Sumire), a cold leader figure (Maria), a small cute character who would be jealous of the other members (Iris), a woman who would be good at athletics (Kanna) and an oddball character who wore glasses (Kohran). The role of the male protagonist was given initially to a young man named Kusaku Kanuma, a member of the Tokyo Metropolitan Police Department who inherits a blade forged by the Japanese swordsmith Muramasa and must work with Sakura to pilot a two-person mech. As with most of the draft scenario, the male character underwent major alterations. Most of the protagonist's development into Ichiro Ogami happened after Akahori joined the team. He created Ogami's role as an avatar for the player who could be friends with every member of the Flower Division. The Japanese word for "wolf" "Okami" (狼), referring to his energetic personality traits, inspired his name.

=== Audio ===
==== Casting ====
When casting actors to voice the game's characters, Hiroi needed people who could both act and sing the musical numbers. To this end, he required potential voice actors to have experience with live stage performance and be able to sing. Hiroi personally approached each of the voice actresses who played members of the Imperial Combat Revue based on their acting and singing abilities before they were pitched the concept of Sakura Wars. Staff members recommended several actresses to Hiroi. Bringing together the voice cast for a video game at such an early stage was unheard of at the time. Because of this, the cast recorded their lines and songs as the game was developed.

- Chisa Yokoyama voiced Sakura. Hiroi chose Yokoyama, who had appeared in notable anime series including Tenchi Muyo!, based on his wish to create a compelling final deathblow line. She was originally cast in the role of Iris but was recast in the role of Sakura after Iris' final voice actress was cast. Yokoyama was used to recording strong characters, so portraying Sakura as a "normal" girl made the role difficult for her to perform.
- Urara Takano voiced Maria. Hiroi offered her the role because of her positive working experiences with Yokoyama. Takano was performing in a concert when Hiroi first approached her. Although the project was in the early stages of development, she was intrigued by Maria's character and agreed to take the role.
- Michie Tomizawa voiced Sumire. Hiroi first approached her in late 1994 during a Christmas concert on the recommendation of a mutual friend. Hiroi pitched his concept for Sumire, and after seeing Tomizawa's performance offered her the role.
- Mayumi Tanaka voiced Kanna. Hiroi selected her for the role based on her experience performing the comedic "handsome man" archetype in kabuki stage performances. Tanaka was instructed to play Kanna as a tomboyish character unconcerned by her true gender.
- Yuriko Fuchizaki voiced Kohran. Fujishima recommended her to Hiroi. She was approached in mid-1995 when recording was being planned for the opening and ending themes, and questions were still being asked by the cast about how to portray the characters.
- Kumiko Nishihara voiced Iris. After hearing Nishihara's performance as Sakura, Yokoyama, who was originally given the role of Iris, suggested they switch roles and Nishihara became Iris' voice actress.
- Ai Orikasa voiced Ayame. She was planning a fan club concert when Hiroi approached her about Sakura Wars on Yokoyama's recommendation. After seeing Ayame's performance, Hiroi offered her the role. While recording her part, Orikasa encountered difficulties portraying the three different versions of Ayame's character.
- Akio Suyama voiced Ogami. At the time, Suyama had little to no voice acting experience and was working part-time at Red Company while training as a voice actor. Hiroi was still looking for a voice actor for Ogami but had a limited budget. On hearing of Hiroi's situation, Suyama offered to take on the role, despite there being only a few notable lines. Faced with his budget and time limitations, Hiroi accepted his offer. Ogami was the last main character to be cast.

Once selected, Hiroi and Tanaka gathered the cast and told them about the project. They were given pictures of their respective characters. The recording sessions were overseen by noted anime and feature film sound director Toshio Sato. He followed Hiroi's request that the characters be portrayed as real people. Sato was initially shocked at being given four script books and told they were just one-third of the script. Sato told the cast voices would be the characters' main emotive force, as the faces of character portraits would be mostly static. Sakura was the last character to be recorded so Sato could focus on how to bring out her heroine status alongside the other characters. One of the elements Sato concentrated on was portraying the fractious relationship between newcomer Sakura and established star Sumire.

==== Music ====
Sakura Wars Soundtrack: Steam Gramophone

Soundtrack album by Kohei Tanaka
- Released: May 2, 1997
- Genre: Video game soundtrack
- Length: 21:25 (disc one); 74:30 (disc two)
- Label: BMG Japan/Lipop Record

The score for Sakura Wars was Kohei Tanaka's first successful video game music composition. He was among the first people to offer support for Hiroi's vision, as few people believed the project would come to fruition. Tanaka was also among the first brought on board for production and served as a teacher figure to the rest of the development team. In a later interview, he stated that he felt like his composing career was at risk while supporting the game. When he began composing the score in 1995, rhythm and percussion dominated Japanese popular music rather than melody. Both Tanaka and Hiroi wanted to reintroduce younger Japanese to beautiful melodies. While thinking about how he could construct the music, Tanaka looked at popular music from the game's time period and worked to re-create its melodies and structure using the popular music styles of the 1990s. Because of the setting and Tanaka's goals, he was able to incorporate multiple music genres including jazz, rumba, and samba alongside more traditional Japanese musical styles.

Tanaka initially planned 50 songs, but this was too many to record and fit into the game within the allotted time and budget. The number was reduced to 24, then to seven. Hiroi was upset by the proposed cuts, so Tanaka asked how much music the team could manage and was told that one CD's worth of content was enough. Tanaka eventually settled on between eleven and twelve songs which made it into the final game. Hiroi wrote the lyrics for all the songs, despite repeatedly protesting that he was not a professional lyricist. Because of his self-professed inexperience, Tanaka ended up being a teacher figure for him. As part of his training, Hiroi went to karaoke sessions, studied the work of famous songwriter Yū Aku, and bought old records of vintage songs. It took between one and two months before Hiroi felt competent enough at writing song lyrics. Sakura Wars' songs all began with Hiroi creating the lyrics and then handing his work to Tanaka for polishing and to be set to music.

Tanaka composed the main theme, "Geki! Teikoku Kagekidan" (Note: Japanese: 激!帝国華撃団), based on Hiroi's instruction to combine the music of a Super Sentai opening theme with the vocal style of the title song for the film Aoi sanmyaku (1949). The main theme was composed and approved in a very short time and Yokoyama sang it. Because of the structure of the song, and the variations in style and vocal strength it required, the recording sessions was a strenuous experience for her and required several takes. One of Tanaka's favorite pieces to compose was the ending theme "Blooming Maidens" (Note: Japanese: 花咲く乙女, Hepburn: Hanasaku Otome), which represented the strong will of the Imperial Combat Revue. Yokoyama was the main vocalist, with backing and chorus work from the rest of the main female cast. The recording took an hour and proved to be an emotional experience for both singers and staff. As the songs were completed very early in the game's development, the rest of the development staff were able to work with them and use them as references when creating other parts of the game and storyline.

The 1997 soundtrack album Sakura Wars Soundtrack: Steam Gramophone contains 51 tracks of music from Sakura Wars. It was published by BMG Japan. In addition to the original soundtrack album, a vocal collection was published by BMG Japan in 1996. Music for the 2003 remake, which features remastered versions of the original soundtrack, was also composed by Tanaka. The soundtrack for the 2003 remake was released by Avex Mode as an album, titled Sakura Wars: In Hot Blood Teigeki Complete Music Collection, shortly after the game's release in February 2003.

== Release ==
Sakura Wars was first announced at a special Sega presentation in 1995 for release in April 1996. The game's unique blend of genres and styles resulted in it being labelled as a new genre dubbed "dramatic adventure" in its marketing. Because of the greatly increased amount of content—particularly the amount of voice acting Hiroi wanted to include—the release date was delayed several months at his insistence, and the game was expanded from a single disc to a two-disc release. To meet the new release date, the developers worked long hours and sometimes through the night. Several pieces of finished content needed to be cut to make the release date. Sakura Wars was released on September 27, 1996. It was reprinted on June 20, 1997, and released as a budget title on February 11, 1998.

A port for the Dreamcast was released on May 25, 2000 and was developed by M2, and a version for i-mode mobile devices was released on December 18, 2006. It was ported with its sequel to the PlayStation Portable (PSP) and released on March 9, 2006. The game was also ported to multiple Microsoft Windows operating platforms. It was released for Windows 95 and Windows 98 systems on August 18, 2000, and for Windows ME and Windows 2000 on February 20, 2003. Because of the game's size, these versions were released on multiple CD-ROMs. A DVD-ROM version was released for Windows 2000, Windows XP and Windows Vista on January 25, 2007.

ASCII Corporation also published two companion guide books for the Saturn release: Sakura Wars Official Guide: Battle Story on December 6, 1996, and Sakura Wars Official Guide: Romance Story on January 9, 1997; both were revised for the Dreamcast release and published by Enterbrain on June 3, 2000.

While Hiroi wanted a Western release for the game, Sakura Wars was not released in English regions. The game's PSP port was scheduled for the North American market, but it was cancelled after Sony classified it as a text novel. Efforts at localizing the series were not undertaken due to Sega's uncertainty over whether the game's blend of genres would find a large enough audience in the West to be profitable. The PC version was twice licensed for release outside Japan; a Chinese version was released in Taiwan and mainland China by Dysin Interactive on August 17, 2001. In Taiwan, the Chinese-language PC version was launched with a promotional event jointly organised by Third Wave and Dysin Interactive. More than 500 fans attended the event, which featured cosplay performances and appearances by representatives of Sega and Overworks, including Overworks president Noriyoshi Ōba. A Russian translation was published by Akella on January 11, 2006; it was the first Sakura Wars title to be localized into a European language. In 2019, an English fan translation project for Sakura Wars led by C.J. Iwakura and Noah Steam was completed and made available on the internet as an unofficial patch.

=== PlayStation 2 remake ===
Sakura Wars: In Hot Blood
- Developer: Overworks
- Publisher: Sega
- Director: Takaharu Terada
- Programmer: Hisao Koba
- Composer: Kohei Tanaka
- Series: Sakura Wars
- Platform: PlayStation 2
- Release: JP: February 22, 2003

In July 2002, a 3D remake of the game for the PlayStation 2 titled Sakura Wars: In Hot Blood (Note: サクラ大戦～熱き血潮に～, Sakura Taisen: Atsuki Chishio Ni) was announced as part of the Sakura Wars World Project, Sega's effort to introduce the Sakura Wars series to a new worldwide audience. Developed by Overworks, the successor to Sega's CS2 R&D division, the remake was directed by Takaharu Terada, who had been battle planner for later Sakura Wars titles. The remake was conceived because unlike the sequels, the first game's previous versions seemed outdated. New CGI segments were created and the anime cinematics were produced by Production I.G. The subtitle was taken from a tanka featured in Midaregami, a collection of tanka by the famous Japanese writer and poet, Akiko Yosano. Hiroi enjoyed her work, so he featured quotes from her poems as subtitles for Sakura Wars titles several times after the first game's release.

The number of graphics and artwork pieces was increased greatly, more recent and new LIPS functions were incorporated, and the Active and Real-time Machine System (ARMS) battle system introduced in later Sakura Wars titles was incorporated with new improvements including special attacks with accompanying short movies. Two additional story episodes were added. One expanded the story of one of the supporting characters, while the other connected to the next entry in the Sakura Wars series. New voice acting was recorded for the characters, with the original actresses returning; these included Tomizawa, who had previously announced her retirement from the role in the early 2000s. Terada positively noted the increased quality of voice recording compared to both the original version and the later Dreamcast titles. The music was redone by Tanaka, mainly at the insistence of the original voice cast.

In Hot Blood was released on February 22, 2003. First print editions came with a special DVD which included a documentary detailing the development process of the Sakura Wars series to that point. Mobile-based tie-in content related to the original mini-games was released later that year. The content was initially going to be accessed through a direct cable connection, but due to driver capacity issues, Hiroi used a password system instead.

== Reception ==
=== Critical reviews ===
Reception

Review scores
Publication	Score
Famitsu	8/10, 9/10, 8/10, 8/10 (SS); 35/40 (PS2)
GameFan	78% (SDC)
GameSpot	7.6/10 (SDC)
RPGamer	7/10
RPGFan	97% (SS); 88% (PS2)
Dreamcast Magazine (JP)	7.66/10 (SDC)
Gamers' Republic	C+ (SDC)
Sega Saturn Magazine (JP)	8.33/10 (SS)

Due to its Japanese exclusivity, most of the English-language reviews for Sakura Wars were published years after the initial release. One contemporary English-language review was in 1996 by GameFan, which covered import games; a 2000 review rated the Dreamcast port of the game highly. Famitsu and Sega Saturn Magazine gave the original version of Sakura Wars high praise. The Dreamcast Magazine rated the Dreamcast port highly, though slightly lower than the Saturn release.

Critics have also rated the game highly in retrospective reviews, most of which were published after the release of the 2000 Dreamcast port. Jake Alley of RPGamer was positive about the story and art design and its replay value but found the gameplay and aspects of its menu design lacking. RPGFan's Nicole Kirk was highly positive about all aspects of the title, citing the artwork and voice acting as the main draw for players. GameSpot's Peter Bartholow, reviewing the Dreamcast port, also praised the game's visuals and story, while noting a lack of real gameplay and the low degree of difficulty.

Famitsu praised In Hot Blood, with reviewers noting that it was more like an entirely new game than a standard remake. Chris Winkler of RPGFan praised the visual upgrade from earlier versions and the continued quality of the music and voice acting. He also positively noted the theme of the clash between Japan's Edo-era cultural isolation and the cosmopolitan attitude after the Meiji Restoration. He concluded the game "can only be wholeheartedly recommended" for both series veterans and newcomers.

At the first CESA Awards in 1996, Sakura Wars won Grand Award, as well as awards in the Best Director, Best Main Character and Best Supporting Character categories.

=== Sales ===
Several staff members were highly sceptical the game would be a commercial success, but Hiroi promised Sega that the game would sell at least 200,000 units. Sakura Wars sold out in many stores within hours of its release. According to Famitsu sales data, Sakura Wars sold an estimated 205,270 units in its first week, reaching the top of the sales charts and selling through just over 57% of its stocks. It was recorded as having the most sales of a Sega original title to that point. It is considered a killer app for the Sega Saturn. As of 2007, Sakura Wars for the Saturn has sold 359,485 units, becoming the 13th best-selling console title in Japan. Sakura Wars ranked sixth in popularity polls published by both South Korean gaming magazines Game Magazine and Game Champ in January 1997, despite not receiving an official release in South Korea. The Dreamcast port debuted with 71,123 units, selling through nearly 65% of its shipment. It eventually reached total sales of 109,686 units, becoming the 33rd best-selling game for the platform. Sakura Wars: In Hot Blood debuted with sales of 142,351 units, reaching third place on Japanese gaming charts. Despite high anticipation, the remake was outsold by Star Ocean: Till the End of Time from Enix (second) and Dynasty Warriors 4 from Koei (first). During 2003, the remake sold 235,622 units, becoming the 54th best-selling title of the year. The Chinese PC version sold out on its release date. A contemporary report by Sina Games credited the Chinese PC release with sales of 60,000 copies, exceeding expectations.

== Legacy ==
Sakura Wars was an unexpected success for both Red Company and Sega, prompting the companies to develop further entries in the series. It spawned three direct sequels; Sakura Wars 2: Thou Shalt Not Die for the Saturn, and Sakura Wars 3: Is Paris Burning? and Sakura Wars 4: Fall in Love, Maidens for the Dreamcast. A fourth sequel was developed for the PlayStation 2; known as Sakura Wars V: Farewell My Lovely in Japan, it was published overseas as Sakura Wars: So Long, My Love, becoming the first entry to release outside Japan. Numerous spin-off titles covering multiple genres related to each entry have also been developed for multiple platforms. The success of Sakura Wars led to a wave of games that combine role-playing and visual novel elements, including Thousand Arms, Riviera: The Promised Land, and Luminous Arc.

Sakura Wars has remained popular in Japan since its release. It was rated as the 13th best game of all time in a 2006 Famitsu poll, with all the main entries then released also appearing in the list. Sakura herself was rated in 2009 by Famitsu as the 17th best Japanese video game character. In a poll published by Famitsu, Sakura Wars and its first sequel were both ranked among the ten most memorable games for the Saturn, while the Dreamcast port of Sakura Wars was also ranked among the most memorable for that platform. Characters from Sakura Wars, Sakura Wars 3 and Sakura Wars: So Long, My Love were included as playable characters in the 2012 Nintendo 3DS crossover title Project X Zone and its 2015 sequel.

=== Media adaptations ===
An OVA series dubbed Sakura Wars: The Gorgeous Blooming Cherry Blossoms was produced and released between 1997 and 1998. Created by Animate and Radix Ace Entertainment, it told a series of stories around events mentioned in Sakura Wars as well as origin stories for the Flower Division members. An anime series of the same name was broadcast in 2000 over a six-month period. Co-produced by Red Company, Madhouse and Studio Matrix, Ryutaro Nakamura directed the anime series. While following the basic plot of Sakura Wars and preserving Hiroi's original vision, several elements such as depictions of the main antagonist's past, Sakura's childhood memories and scenes within the Flower Division before Ogami's arrival were added. A major issue was being faithful to both the video game and OVAs while keeping within the restrictions of a television format.

A manga adaptation written by Hiroi and illustrated by Ikku Masa, with cover illustrations by Fujishima, began serialization in 2002. The first series ended in December 2008, but its popularity led to a second ongoing series the following year. The first manga was originally serialized in Monthly Magazine Z until it closed down in 2008, shifting to other publications. The manga has been released in tankōbon volumes since 2003 by the magazines' parent company Kodansha.

== Notes and references ==
=== Bibliography ===
- Sega Staff (September 21, 1996). サクラ大戦 マニュアル [Sakura Wars Manual] (in Japanese). Sega. GS-9037.
- サクラ大戦―原画&設定資料集 [Sakura Wars - Original Picture & Setting Material Collection] (in Japanese). SoftBank Creative. 1996. ISBN 4-7973-0128-7.
- わたしが愛したゲームキャラ [Game Characters I Loved] (in Japanese). SoftBank Creative. 1999. ISBN 4-7973-0941-5.
- サクラ大戦公式ガイド 戦闘篇 [Sakura Wars Official Guide: Battle Story] (in Japanese). Enterbrain. 2000. ISBN 4-7577-0091-1.
- 広井王子の全仕事 [Complete Work of Oji Hiroi] (in Japanese). Everyday Communications. 2000. ISBN 4-8399-0259-3.
- サクラ大戦4 ~恋せよ乙女~ 最終攻略&設定資料集 [Sakura Wars 4: Fall in Love, Maidens - Final Strategy & Setting Information Collection] (in Japanese). SoftBank Creative. July 25, 2002. ISBN 4-7973-2010-9.
- サクラ大戦クロニクル [Sakura Wars Chronicle] (in Japanese). Mainichi Communications. July 28, 2003. ISBN 4-8399-0960-1.
- サクラ大戦1~5イラストレーションズ 藤島康介のキャラクター仕事 [Sakura Wars 1 - 5 Character Illustrations: Work of Kosuke Fujishima] (in Japanese). Ikusha. January 26, 2006. ISBN 4-7580-1049-8.
- サクラ大戦 15th Anniversary 太正浪漫グラフ [Sakura Wars 15th Anniversary Taisho Romantic Graph] (in Japanese). Enterbrain. September 30, 2011. ISBN 978-4-0472-7571-3.
