= Sakura Wars 4: Fall in Love, Maidens =

2002 video game

- Dreamcast box art, featuring protagonists Sakura Shinguji and Erica Fontaine
- Developers: Red Entertainment; Overworks
- Publishers: JP: Sega; CN: Beijing Entertainment All Technology
- Director: Katsuhiko Goto
- Producer: Yuji Horikawa
- Designer: Takehiko Akaba
- Programmer: Mikio Kume
- Artist: Hidenori Matsubara
- Writers: Satoru Akahori; Hiroyuki Kawasaki
- Composer: Kohei Tanaka
- Series: Sakura Wars
- Platforms: Dreamcast, Windows
- Release: Dreamcast: JP: March 21, 2002; Windows: JP: March 3, 2005
- Genres: Tactical role-playing, dating sim, visual novel
- Mode: Single-player

Sakura Wars 4: Fall in Love, Maidens (Note: Japanese: サクラ大戦4 〜恋せよ乙女〜, Hepburn: Sakura Taisen Fō: Koiseyo Otome) is a video game developed by Red Entertainment and Overworks and published by Sega for the Dreamcast. The fourth main installment in the Sakura Wars series and the last for Sega home consoles, it was released in March 2002. Defined by its publisher as a "dramatic adventure" game, Sakura Wars 4 combines overlapping tactical role-playing, dating sim and visual novel gameplay elements.

Set six months after the events of Sakura Wars 3: Is Paris Burning? and Sakura Wars: The Movie, main protagonist Ichiro Ogami returns to Tokyo and reunites with the Imperial Combat Revue and its "Flower Division", a troupe of magically-imbued women who also works as a theater company. While Ogami produces the group's adaptation of Les Misérables, the Imperial Combat Revue must join forces with the Paris Division to stop the hostile ghost of the main antagonist, Ōkubo Nagayasu, from terrorizing Tokyo.

Sakura Wars 4 was intended to take place in New York, continuing Ogami's overseas adventures. When the Dreamcast was discontinued by Sega, the development team instead decided to create a celebratory game to conclude Ogami's narrative. The game took just ten months to make, resulting in less gameplay content than previous Sakura Wars games. While reusing gameplay assets from Is Paris Burning?, the graphics were improved using new software tools. The game was produced by Yuji Horikawa and directed by Katsuhiko Goto, with Noriyoshi Ohba serving as executive producer; it was the last game in the series to involve Ohba. The game has been praised by critics, and is one of Japan's best-selling Dreamcast titles. The game's initial concepts would be used in the next entry, Sakura Wars: So Long, My Love.

== Gameplay ==
The two main gameplay modes of Sakura Wars are social interaction using the LIPS system (above), and turn-based strategic battles which is directly influenced by earlier LIPS interactions (below).

Sakura Wars 4: Fall in Love, Maidens is a game in which the player controls the role of Ichiro Ogami and two all-female combat groups; the "Flower Division" of the Imperial Combat Revue and the "Paris Division" of the France-based Paris Combat Revue. Their goal is to stop Ōkubo Nagayasu from terrorizing Tokyo. Dubbed a "dramatic adventure" game and taking place across three "acts", the gameplay segments incorporate tactical role-playing, dating sim and visual novel elements. Gameplay is divided between periods where Ogami navigates the Grand Imperial Theater and interacts with various characters, and combat sequences governed by a turn-based battle system across a three-dimensional (3D) area allowing full range of movement.

During the adventure sections, when talking with both the main heroines and supporting characters from the Imperial Combat Revue, conversations rely on the series' "Live & Interactive Picture System" (LIPS); when faced with critical choices in the course of a conversation, dialogue options are displayed with a time limit for the player to select a response. Depending on the type of response, the character may respond positively or negatively, impacting their relationship and future interactions with Ogami. The game also incorporates "Double LIPS", where interactions cross between multiple characters; and "Analog LIPS", where a single response's intensity is judged by the player. If save data from the Dreamcast versions of the last three Sakura Wars titles is imported, Ogami's romance choices from those games are incorporated into the narrative.

During combat segments, the Flower Division fight monsters in the streets of Tokyo using machines called Koubu. As with Is Paris Burning?, the game uses the "Active & Realtime Machine System" (ARMS), where each unit has a full range of movement, with their distance limited by an Action Point meter. Each unit can perform two actions during their turn, which cover a variety of actions including attacking, healing, boosting a unit's statistics, and defending. Actions taken during LIPS sequences with members of the Flower Division directly impact battles; skillful performances during LIPS segments raise a character's Trust, granting status increases and improving combat ability. LIPS interactions can also unlock Combination and Coalesce attacks, where two characters perform a joint attack to deal high damage to a single enemy. If certain conditions are not met or if Ogami's unit is destroyed, the game ends.

== Synopsis ==
In 1927 Tokyo, four months after his return from Paris, (Note: As depicted in Sakura Wars 3: Is Paris Burning? (2001) and Sakura Wars: The Movie (2001).) Imperial Japanese Navy Lieutenant Ichiro Ogami has reunited with the Flower Division of the Imperial Combat Revue. All is quiet until a powerful spirit breaks free of its imprisonment in Ginza and begins terrorizing the city using a powerful golden Koubu. Immobilized by a golden mist produced by the Koubu, the Flower Division are easily beaten back and their base at the Grand Imperial Theater damaged. The ghost belongs to Ōkubo Nagayasu, a corrupt samurai daimyo enraged at his vilification by the people following his death. When Nagayasu is about to kill the Flower Division in another attack, the Paris Combat Revue arrives and rescues them, answering the Imperial Combat Revue's call for aid. When Nagayasu steals the Mikasa, the two groups weaken Nagayasu and Ogami and his chosen companion use a powerful Koubu, the Soubu, to exorcise the ghost, restoring peace to Tokyo.

In their role as a theatre troupe, the Flower Division are preparing a stage adaptation of Les Misérables, which Ogami is tasked with directing. The need to properly portray the marriage scene leads to widespread misunderstandings as both Ogami and Flower Division members think each is proposing to the other. This is further complicated if Ogami had previously romanced any member of both the Flower and Paris Divisions. When the Paris Combat Revue arrives, if Ogami romanced any of them during the events of Is Paris Burning?, a love triangle situation is created. Ogami must choose which character he wishes to commit to. The production of Les Misérables is a resounding success, and Ogami is left as the sole figure of authority after the Imperial Combat Revue's original manager Ikki Yoneda retires, satisfied that Ogami can succeed him. The final scenes vary depending on whether Ogami romanced any member of the Flower or Paris Divisions, and which character Ogami chooses to commit to.

== Development ==
Concept work for Sakura Wars 4 began during the last development stages for Sakura Wars 3: Is Paris Burning?. Sakura Wars 4 was originally going to be set in New York, continuing Ogami's overseas travels to both there and a planned Division in Taiwan. When it was announced that series publisher Sega were ending production on the Dreamcast, Sega asked that Sakura Wars 4 be moved to the PlayStation 2. The team disagreed, with series creator and general producer Oji Hiroi not wanting the series' final Dreamcast entry to be Is Paris Burning?. With this in mind, Red Company and Overworks instead decided to create a celebratory final entry for the Dreamcast. The game was directed by Katsuhito Goto, produced by Yuji Horikawa and executive produced by Noriyoshi Ohba. Ohba previously produced or executive produced the previous Sakura Wars games. Also returning from Is Paris Burning? were regular series character designer Hidenori Matsubara, scenario writers Satoru Akahori and Hiroyuki Kawasaki, and composer Kohei Tanaka. While previous development cycles had lasted two years or more, Sakura Wars 4 was completed in ten months. Sakura Wars 4 was designed as a "gift" from the developers to long-term fans.

The production proved challenging for the team despite the scenario being completed by the time of its announcement. The game system was based on the work done for Is Paris Burning?, with minimal changes made. The Koubu designs were redone slightly, with smoother bodies and new perforated body parts, requiring the integration of both new and updated software tools, which were also applied to complicated environmental effects in cutscenes. The anime sequences were directed by Susumu Kudo and produced by Production I.G, who previously worked on Is Paris Burning?, Sakura Wars 2: Thou Shalt Not Die, and the Sakura Wars film. The opening also played into the theme of celebration, showing the cast in relaxed situations. Rather than increase their quantity over previous titles, the teams chose to focus on quality. The anime sequences combined traditional animation with CGI-based elements to allow for greater fluidity The CGI mecha animations were created using techniques used for the movie. A troublesome part of development integrating new video software, with the aim to create the smoothest possible gameplay experience to date. This was possible due to the long-standing positive working relationship between Overworks and Production I.G.

Due to the development goals and short production period, the story was considerably shorter than earlier Sakura Wars, being formatted as a three act play rather than an anime series. The theatre theme also carried over into the motifs surrounding the main villain. The theme of the story was "eternal love", a culmination of the overall theme of romance used in the Sakura Wars series. While it was a legitimate sequel to the earlier Sakura Wars games, the density of the cast caused staff to compare it to a special program or fan disc. The inclusion of Les Misérables reflected the influences of Paris on Ogami since his return to Tokyo. For reference, the team used Kuroiwa Shūroku's 1919 translation, which was among the earliest Japanese versions of the novel. Cast members took on unconventional roles within the play as it would give them a means of evolving as characters; a cited example was Sakura taking a villainous role. The story ultimately acted as the closure for Ogami's storyline, bringing together the casts of the Sakura Wars series up to that point. The game's subtitle was taken from a poem by Japanese writer Tekkan Yosano, with Hiroi saying players would understand the quote's reference better after reading the whole poem.

=== Audio ===
Before beginning development on Sakura Wars 4, the team contacted the main cast from the past games (Chisa Yokoyama, Michie Tomizawa, Urara Takano, Kumiko Nishihara, Yuriko Fuchizaki, Mayumi Tanaka, Maya Okamoto, Kazue Ikura, Noriko Hidaka, Saeko Shimazu, Etsuko Kozakura, Kikuko Inoue and Yoshino Takamori) to ensure they could include all thirteen heroines. Once this was agreed, the team began development. Sakura Wars 4 was at the time the last major performance by Tomizawa as central heroine Sumire Kanzaki, as Tomizawa retired from the role in 2002.

The opening song, a remix of the series theme titled "Geki! Tei - Finale", (Note: Japanese: 激!帝 〜最終章〜(フィナーレ), Hepburn: Geki! Tei ~Fināre~) and the ending song, "You, My Flower", (Note: Japanese: 君よ、花よ, Hepburn: Kimi yo, Hana yo) were performed by the main cast. "Geki! Tei - Finale" was Ogami actor Akio Suyama's first time singing a theme for the series, performing it with backing from the female cast. Hiroi was the first to suggest Suyama perform the songs. The ending theme was designed as a touching farewell ballad, with Takana's favourite part being the unison of all the singers during the theme's later half. Reusing a discarded plan for the theme of Is Paris Burning?, Tanaka wrote the song in the same key as "Geki! Teikoku Kagekidan". Hiroi originally wanted Suyama to sing the whole song, but Tanaka talked him out of it and relied on the actor's speaking talents to narrate his lyrics.

== Release ==
Sakura Wars 4 was first announced in June 2001; when announced, Hiroi was quick to point out that while it was the last series entry for the Dreamcast, it was not the final entry in the Sakura Wars series. A preview disc was released with Sakura Wars Online, featuring promotional images and trailers released up to that point. Running up to the game's release, Is Paris Burning? and the Dreamcast ports of the first two Sakura Wars games were reissued at reduced prices by Sega. The game was released on March 21, 2002. It was later ported to Microsoft Windows personal computers (PC). It was released for Windows 98, Windows ME, Windows 2000 and Windows XP on March 3, 2005. This version required multiple CD-ROMs due to the game's size. A DVD-ROM version for Windows 2000, Windows XP and Windows Vista on January 25, 2007. The PC version was published in China by Beijing Entertainment All Technology on January 28, 2007. As with most of the Sakura Wars series, the game never saw a release in the Western market. Localization efforts were prevented due to Sega's uncertainty as to whether the game's blend of genres would find a profitable audience outside Japan.

== Reception ==
Reception

Review scores
| Publication | Score |
|---|---|
| Famitsu | 10/10, 9/10, 8/10, 9/10 |
| RPGFan | 90% |

During its first week on sale, Sakura Wars 4 sold over 207,000 copies, selling through over 80% of its initial shipments. As of 2004, the game has sold over 257,000 copies, making the game the tenth best-selling Dreamcast title in Japan. As of 2007, the game is the fourth best-selling Sakura Wars title behind its predecessor. The game's soundtrack album was awarded at the 2003 Japan Gold Disc Awards in the "Animation – Album of the Year" category.

Four writers for the Japanese gaming magazine Famitsu reviewed Sakura Wars 4. The reviewers were highly complimentary towards the game praising its high quality visuals and well deserved finale for the players who have stuck with the series. One reviewer did comment that it the game may be awkward for newcomers due to the large amount of characters from past games appearing. RPGFan noted the game's focus on the theater, which the reviewer generally enjoyed despite missing the previous games' episodic format and noting a continued amount of unresolved plot threads. The graphics were praised for their increased quality and its solid gameplay elements, but criticised its short length.

Japanese site Game Watch Impress was very positive about the storyline, graphics and the gameplay system. The main issue raised was that the game was not designed for series newcomers due to its callbacks and short length. 4Gamer.net's Tetsuya Asakura, reviewing the PC version, praised the story options opened with the entire cast being present, and its solid gameplay. His main points of criticism were the limited graphical options and its short length.

== Legacy ==
In honor of Tomizawa's retirement from the role of Sumire following Sakura Wars 4, an original video animation (OVA) titled Sakura Wars; Sumire Kanzaki Retirement Memorial—Su・Me・Re was produced by Radix Ace Entertainment and Overworks; Tanaka created the music, while Kawasaki wrote the script. Depicting Sumire's retirement from the Flower Division and her career as an actress, it features Tomizawa's last performance in the role. The OVA was released for VHS and DVD on December 18, 2002. Funimation dubbed the OVA and released it in North America on October 26, 2005 under the title Sakura Wars: Sumire. Tomizawa would eventually return to the role for 2019's Sakura Wars.

The original plans for Sakura Wars 4 were carried over into the next Sakura Wars game, which was being developed for the PlayStation 2. Titled Sakura Wars V: Farewell, My Love in Japan, it was released in Japan in 2005 and overseas in 2010 for both the PlayStation 2 and Wii as Sakura Wars: So Long, My Love. So Long, My Love formed part of the Sakura Wars World Project, a group of seven games being developed for the PlayStation 2 to expand the series' audience and eventually release internationally. Four games in the group were released, but only So Long, My Love was released overseas, while the remaining three projects were officially cancelled in September 2008.
