= Resonance of Fate =

2010 video game

- European cover art featuring main protagonists Zephyr (left), Leanne (center), and Vashyron (back)
- Developer: tri-Ace
- Publishers: Sega (PS3, 360); tri-Ace (PC, PS4, PS5); Arc System Works (PS4)
- Director: Takayuki Suguro
- Producers: Mitsuhiro Shimano; Jun Yoshino
- Programmers: Yuichiro Kitao; Yoshiharu Gotanda
- Artists: Kentaro Kagami; Masashi Nakagawa
- Writers: Masaki Norimoto; Yasushi Otake
- Composers: Motoi Sakuraba; Kōhei Tanaka
- Platforms: PlayStation 3; Xbox 360; 4K/HD Edition; Microsoft Windows; PlayStation 4; Enhanced Remaster; Microsoft Windows; PlayStation 5
- Release: January 28, 2010: PlayStation 3, Xbox 360; JP: January 28, 2010; NA: March 16, 2010; AU: March 18, 2010; EU: March 26, 2010; 4K/HD Edition Microsoft Windows, PlayStation 4; WW: October 18, 2018; Enhanced Remaster Microsoft Windows, PlayStation 5; WW: October 29, 2026
- Genre: Role-playing
- Mode: Single-player

Resonance of Fate (Note: Known in Japan as End of Eternity (Japanese: エンド オブ エタニティ, Hepburn: Endo obu Etaniti)) is a role-playing video game developed by tri-Ace and published by Sega for the PlayStation 3 and Xbox 360. It was released in January 2010 in Japan and March 2010 in Western territories. The game uses a fast-paced strategic combat system revolving around different types of firearms and combination moves between the three playable characters. A remastered version titled Resonance of Fate 4K/HD Edition was released worldwide for PlayStation 4 and Microsoft Windows on October 18, 2018. A second remaster, titled Resonance of Fate Enhanced Remaster, was released worldwide for PlayStation 5 and Microsoft Windows on October 29, 2026.

Resonance of Fate takes place on Earth in the distant future. When atmospheric pollution nearly annihilates life on Earth, the remnants of humanity construct a purification system called Basel. In time, the surviving human population create a civilization around Basel's central tower, watched over by its mechanical core Zenith. Zenith ties human lives to quartz stones, making them immune to the pollution while giving them predetermined social status and lifespans. The three protagonists—Zephyr, Leanne, and Vashyron—form a mercenary group that take odd jobs for the populace of Basel. During their missions, they discover a plan by the city's ruling Cardinals to subvert Zenith's rule, and discover their own connections to the Cardinals' plans.

Resonance of Fate is set in a steampunk environment with combat involving guns. Developed with a Western audience in mind, it was the first collaboration between tri-Ace and Sega which formed due to the originality of the project and Sega's interest in gaining a high-profile role-playing game for its catalog. It was designed around tri-Ace's proprietary ASKA Engine, which was shared with titles such as Star Ocean: The Last Hope. Its gameplay was influenced by multiple Western action films including The Matrix. The music was co-composed by Motoi Sakuraba and Kohei Tanaka. Reception of the title was mixed, with its gameplay receiving the majority of praise.

== Gameplay ==
A battle in Resonance of Fate with the Bezel gauges system at the bottom

The combat of Resonance of Fate employs the "tri-Attack Battle system", which involves a mixture of real-time and turn-based controls. During each character's turn, the player can move around and perform actions, limited by the number of action points. The turn ends when the player attacks or all action points are exhausted. Initiating an attack employs a charging system; once a target is selected, the attack charges up until the meter is full and the attack is unleashed. Players can also choose to charge up the attack multiple times, for a more powerful attack. The time needed to charge depends on the proximity of the enemy. Closer enemies require less charge time but it renders the player more vulnerable to attack. Enemies also require charge to attack and battle strategy involves interrupting their charges. There are two damage types in the game. The first is "scratch damage", which is only dealt by sub-machine guns. Scratch damage accumulates quickly, but cannot kill an opponent. Scratch damage must be converted into "direct damage", using pistols and grenades on an enemy with scratch damage to defeat it.

Players are able to move around the battlefield freely, but they have the option to create predefined paths for the character to follow. While moving along these paths, characters gain access to Hero actions, which make them immune to damage and speed up charge times. However, the use of these Hero actions requires the use of Bezels; these items are an essential element in battle and are recharged through a variety of methods, such as destroying portions of an enemy's weapons and armor, or killing an enemy. Characters using Hero actions can attack while jumping in the air, and are also able to unleash special attacks which manifest as stylish firearm maneuvers. Enemies are only able to move while the player's current character is moving and will usually attack only that character.

In addition to fueling Hero actions, Bezels act as a safeguard to character defeat. Characters will not receive any direct damage as long as there is at least one Bezel. If there are enough Bezels remaining, receiving damage that would otherwise defeat the character instead causes the character to be knocked into the air and the Bezel is shattered into shards that scatter across the battlefield. If the player does not have any Bezels remaining, the characters go into critical mode. Critical mode causes the characters to become extremely scared, leaving them unable to shoot quickly, unable to use Hero actions, and taking direct damage from every attack. Four Bezel Shards must be collected by the characters in order to restore a Bezel and replenish their power, and enemies can even pick up Bezel Shards to regenerate health and shields. The game ends if any character is killed and there are no intact Bezels to protect them.

The player may suspend and save the game at any time. Upon completion of the game, the player may start a New Game Plus, which restarts the game with certain features carried over and unlocks a harder mode. With each successful completion of a new difficulty level, further difficulty levels will become available in which enemy health and damage is multiplied. There are ten difficulty settings in Resonance of Fate.

== Synopsis ==
=== Setting ===
Resonance of Fate takes place on Earth in the distant future. The levels of pollution in the atmosphere trigger massive environmental changes, making the world hostile to human life. On the brink of extinction, humanity creates Basel, a giant air purification module controlled by the Zenith System. As conditions worsened in the land surrounding Basel, the remnants of humanity gathered around it and built a great city at the base of Zenith's tower. While Basel and the Zenith System control the surrounding environment to make it habitable for humans, it also controls the human population: each person has their social status determined at birth, and their exact lifespan is controlled through quartz crystals programmed by Zenith. Basel evolves for countless years into a class-driven society, the populace forgets everything about Basel's past: those at the top of the tower are the city's leaders, dubbed Cardinals, and indoctrinate the people into a religion deifying the Zenith System.

=== Characters ===
- Zephyr (ゼファー, Zefā) – Raised in a seminary from a young age, it is suggested he was an outcast as he did not agree with the God-based teachings; for motivations not entirely clear, Zephyr became deranged and killed everyone at the facility before being subdued by Vashyron. Despite expecting to die, Zenith intervened; Zephyr stays with Vashyron as his partner. They make their living as "Hunters", mercenaries that take on odd jobs throughout Basel. He is voiced by Scott Menville in English and Hiro Shimono in Japanese.
- Leanne (リーンベル, Rīnberu; Reanbell in the Japanese version) – A young woman living with Zephyr and Vashyron, acting as a trainee recruit on their jobs. She is also known as Subject #20 (実験体20号, Jikken-tai 20-gō; lit. "Experimental Body No. 20")—as part of a test of Zenith's life-controlling capabilities, she is meant to die on her 20th birthday though she somehow survived beyond her designated time. Unlike the rest of the cast, her name was changed in the Western versions in consultation with the original team to better suit naming tastes overseas. Leanne is voiced by Jessica DiCicco in English and Aya Endou in Japanese.
- Vashyron (ヴァシュロン, Vashuron) – A former official soldier of the Cardinals who was the sole survivor of his team, he now makes his living as the leader of the Hunters. He acts as an older brother figure to Zephyr and Leanne, not talking much about his past and acting as the most light-hearted member of the group. Vashyron is voiced by Nolan North in English and Ken Narita in Japanese.
- Rowen (ロエン, Roen) – The ruling Cardinal of Basel, acting as one of the main antagonists. He is the man who authorized the experiment that created Leanne and her nineteen counterparts. Traumatized by the death of Prelate Frieda, he wishes to fulfill her dream and perhaps bring her back to life. Rowen is voiced by Jim Ward in English and Keiji Fujiwara in Japanese.
- Sullivan (サリバン, Sariban) – The Cardinal responsible for the experiments on Zephyr and Leanne, and the man who originally revealed the Zenith System's true nature to Rowen. His research, while also working against Zenith, goes in a different direction than Rowen's, working to free humanity from the need to stay close to Zenith. Sullivan is voiced by Chris Edgerly in English and Takehito Koyasu in Japanese.
- Rebecca (レベッカ, Rebekka) – A woman from beyond the borders of Basel. She is one of a few humans who were left to die beyond Basel's borders and evolved immunity and superhuman strength, which led to them hating the people of Basel. During an attack, she has a run-in with Vashyron, and has her mind broken by Zenith. She is taken in by Sullivan, with whom she establishes a strong bond. Throughout most of the game, Rebecca does not speak intelligibly, instead making non-verbal noises. Rebecca is voiced by Catherine Taber in English and Yukana in Japanese.
- Juris (ユリス, Yurisu) – A scientist who worked with Rowen on the project that birthed Leanne. After seeing the other subjects die at their appointed times, Juris took pity on Leanne and freed her, leading to her meeting Zephyr and Vashyron. Juris is voiced by Kirk Thornton in English and Hidenobu Kiuchi in Japanese.
- Frieda (フリーダ, Furīda) – The former Prelate (教皇, Kyōkō; lit. "Pope"), leader of the Cardinals and ruler of Basel, she wished to free the people from the fates given to them by the Zenith System. Her wish attracted the following of the Cardinals, particularly Rowen, but she was killed by extremists. Her death is the catalyst for Rowen and Sullivan's actions. Frieda is voiced by Julie Nathanson in English and Yuki Sakura in Japanese.

=== Plot ===
The game opens with Vashyron doing battle with a berserk Zephyr. Despite Zephyr being shot twice in the head, he does not die. Vashyron decides to take him in as a partner in his Hunter group. Some time later, Zephyr sees and attempts to save Leanne as she jumps from a bridge, and both miraculously survive their resultant fall. The story skips forward two years—Zephyr and Vashyron are running their group with Leanne, taking on odd jobs across the city. Among their clients are the ruling Cardinals and people from lower strata of the tower. During their missions, they encounter instances of people's fates changing unexpectedly, going against the pre-determined path set by Zenith. They also have run-ins with Rebecca, a superhuman, mentally unstable woman from beyond Basel's borders. It is revealed that Vashyron himself faced Rebecca when she first arrived in Basel. He was fatally wounded, but was saved by Zenith, and its resultant retaliation on Rebecca broke her mind.

As they continue taking missions, the three learn that the city's ruling Cardinals are directly responsible for the crisis. Over twenty years before, Prelate Frieda envisioned a world where people were free of Zenith's control. While she was popular among the Cardinals, with her closest ally being Cardinal Rowen, her ideals led to her being killed by extremists. Rowen was thrown into despair by her death, and when shown the truth about Zenith by Cardinal Sullivan, he is convinced to work with the other Cardinals to fulfill Frieda's vision. Rowen and Sullivan create test subjects programmed to die at specific times: Leanne was #20, designed to die on her 20th birthday. A sympathetic scientist named Juris freed Leanne, and when she learned the truth, she tried to commit suicide before being saved by Zephyr. At the same time, Sullivan studied Rebecca, who had developed natural immunity to the poisons beyond Basel's borders, and sought a way of imprinting her powers onto others. Zephyr was one of his test subjects, along with Zephyr's sister, who was killed by Zephyr during his rampage.

By the time Vashyron and his comrades learn the full tale from Juris, Rowen is in the midst of a crisis of faith due to his control over the Zenith System through his ring. During the party's confrontation with Sullivan where he threatens to destroy Leanne's quartz, Rowen shoots Sullivan to try and prove the existence of a higher power through Leanne's survival. The three then confront Rowen directly and fatally wound him, but Rowen's control of the Zenith System preserves his life. Vashyron calls Zephyr and Leanne off, seeing further fighting is pointless. During the game's credits, Rowen uses his power to resurrect the Cardinals, then leaves the control ring on Frieda's grave, and Sullivan is seen reuniting with Rebecca. In a post-credit scene, Leanne, Zephyr and Vashyron explore the now-clean world beyond Basel, and Leanne's quartz is revealed to have been safely embedded in her hand.

== Development ==
Development of Resonance of Fate took place over three years, beginning around 2007, using the codename "Project Cobra". The game was developed by tri-Ace, whose other notable games include Valkyrie Profile and the Star Ocean series. It was directed by Takayuki Suguro, produced by Mitsuhiro Shimano and Jun Yoshino, and programmed by Yuichiro Kitao and Yoshiharu Gotanda. At the start of development, the team decided upon the key concepts: a story focusing on the world's fate, a setting where human life was "managed", a limited number of characters, a unified game area that was expansive while not being open world, and a combat system that revolved around firearms. During the planning stages, production time and costs were taken in account, and all the features were carefully planned and chosen so as little content as possible needed to be cut. According to Suguro, the game began development on Xbox 360 because it was the first major seventh generation console to be released, and it was relatively easy to develop games on the system. It was ported to the PlayStation 3 later in production.

A key element of the gameplay is its focus on guns over swords and magic. When deciding upon the game's basics, the team wanted to create a cinematic feeling in battles. If they had gone with a more traditional battle system, then it would have quickly lost its cinematic quality due to the prevalence of close combat. Likewise, they wanted the cinematic feel to persist throughout the whole game rather than restricted to cutscenes. A major challenge was to strike a balance between accessibility and difficulty when developing for a player base that might be made of up of both action game and RPG players. This resulted in the addition of strategy elements. Another wish was to create something new and fresh in the RPG market. When creating the gameplay style, the team looked at action movies such as The Matrix and Rebellion during their research. Despite its fast-paced action, the game relies heavily upon strategic, turn-based gameplay. During early development, the game was based on a real-time system and meant for only one character to be controlled by the player; the other two would have been handled by the game's artificial intelligence (AI). After some testing, they decided that this would create unwanted difficulties in gameplay such as characters dying off-screen without the player noticing or the AI not directing them properly.

On designing the battle system, Kitao said that his two main aims were creating something never before seen in an RPG and designing something accessible yet challenging. Adjustments to the battle system went on all through development, with some changes being made at the very last minute. The gun customization system was originally a puzzle-based system, but was later converted to a diagram set-up. Weapons were originally going to be represented in three-dimensions, but technical issues prevented this. On the whole, the development was a taxing one for him. The most difficult part about incorporating guns into the system was creating a workable system that did not rely on first-person and third-person shooter mechanics. The two types of damage and various special moves in the game were born from the team's discussions about how the three playable characters might be directed to work in unison, dealing different types of attacks. Being able to attack while moving was inspired by a suggestion from staff members stemming from more traditional action games and scenes from Hollywood action films. For the camera, the team decided to balance it between limited control during player turns and a more dynamic feel during attacks.

The game was developed using an in-house multi-platform proprietary engine called ASKA (tri-Ace Superlative Knowledge-based Architecture), developed by a team led by Gotanda. The engine was in development since 2005 and was used for three different games in tandem: Resonance of Fate, Infinite Undiscovery and Star Ocean: The Last Hope. While the staff were satisfied with its performance, it had to be customized for this game's specific needs. The engine employs multiple advanced graphics and lighting techniques, including high-dynamic-range rendering, and multiple layered shader tools to manage graphical layers and shadow effects. Motion blur effects were implemented using techniques similar to those of the second-generation CryEngine. Creating realistic blurring during camera movement was complicated by graphical inconsistencies generated by ASKA's structure. A separate graphics buffer system was designed to address the issue. Environments and characters employ a relatively low number of polygons in order to free up resources to render the main cast, whose character models use at least four times as many polygons as models in the PlayStation 2 era. The main characters' faces use 40 bones for facial movement and their hair use 250. This enables more detailed facial expressions compared to the "doll"-like facial movements of earlier video game characters. Character hair uses additional shaders and layered textures to give it a lifelike appearance and behavior. The physics simulation was similar to that used for Valkyrie Profile 2: Silmeria, but improved and expanded to suit the new hardware's capacity. There were minor differences between the graphical effects and performances of the Xbox 360 and PlayStation 3 titles. Shadow and blurring effects were more sophisticated on 360. The estimated frame rate of 30fps was identical across both versions. The team managed to fit all the game's content onto a single disc for both versions while keeping load times short. This was due to the staff not wanting players to know when they had reached the halfway point, prolonging the sense of adventure.

=== Scenario and design ===
The story and script were created by Suguro and Masaki Norimoto, and the script was written by Norimoto and Yasushi Otake. For Norimoto, his primary challenge was taking the story's themes—conflicts between justice and evil, the nature of God, and destiny—which were fairly common in RPGs, and put an original spin on them. He did not want to create specific heroes and villains, blurring the lines between friend and foe and having each character following their own understandable agenda. The team decided upon a steampunk aesthetic over a science fiction setting as the latter would necessitate an overly-distant future setting. It was also chosen as steampunk was a rarity in video games. The gun-based gameplay likewise drove the game to a more realistic setting. The Zenith System was conceived as equivalent to a supercomputer from science fiction, which ties into the story elements surrounding Zenith's control of humanity. The choice to make Zenith an impartial machine stems from the team not wanting an off-screen third party force to distract the player from the main narrative. The writers decided to make Zenith the product of an earlier culture rather than a contemporary creation. The Zenith System's influence over the fate of its people gave rise to the design motif of cogs, creating a "world of clockwork". This motif of an inorganic force controlling humanity fits in with the theme of human strength finding expression, acting as a counterweight against Zenith's influence. The overall design of Basel mirrors its mechanical nature, being grim and inorganic, but dashes of color are present through references to the city's religion to balance this out.

The character and world designs were handled by art director Kentaro Kagami, and artist and graphics designer Masashi Nakagawa. Leanne was the first character to be envisioned, before most of the game's concepts had been finalized. The second was Zephyr, who was nicknamed "Boy of the Demonic Possession". The third was Vashyron, who was dubbed "ultimate gentleman". While originally conceived as a "glistening" character, he was reworked as a big brother figure, which in turn led to the scene where he and Zephyr first fight. Rowen's early artwork depict his position as an authority figure looking down on the world from the Zenith System. According to Kagami, his character artwork was created in consultation with Norimoto and Suguro. The three main characters went through multiple design revisions. While Zephyr and Vashyron were designed to reflect the grim environment of Basel, Leanne was meant to contrast against them. Zephyr was initially a lighter, less antagonistic character due to him being younger than Leanne. Unlike other characters, Vashyron's design went through a fairly smooth development process, with his clothing remaining consistent through the design phase. Leanne's clothing took a long time to finalize: earlier versions of her were based on a concept of her being fashion conscious, but this made her look odd next to the other characters. The small cast was something decided upon at an early stage, along with adjusting the male characters to appear less feminine than others from Japanese RPGs. The latter change was made with a Western audience in mind. The CGI cutscenes were created by Marza Animation Planet.

=== Audio ===
The music for Resonance of Fate was composed by Motoi Sakuraba and Kōhei Tanaka: Sakuraba had done work on multiple titles for tri-Ace titles, while Tanaka's most notable recent work was on the Sakura Wars series for Sega. Their work began in 2009. The two composers were asked to collaborate on Resonance of Fate by tri-Ace and Sega respectively. Sakuraba was originally going to compose 41 tracks for the game, but during development the number increased to 77. Tanaka's contribution amounted to between 30 and 40 pieces. Sakuraba was told to make the music in an old-fashioned style with no clear leitmotifs, while Tanaka had great freedom. One major directive was that their music tracks should contrast with each other. Sakuraba handled the game's battle music, with many of his tracks using a strong rock music element using synthesizers meant to emulate music from the 1960s and 70s. Some of his pieces were deliberately outside his usual style, using analog synthesizer and electric piano and recording the resultant sound after it had been fed through leslie speakers. He also worked against custom by improvising some pieces. Tanaka composed tracks for cutscenes, town areas, and the title theme; he was asked to focus on "regal orchestra" instrumentation. His tracks were recorded with a group of studio musicians at Hitomi Memorial Hall who were able to emulate the impact of a full orchestra.

Japanese voice recording for the game began two years before its release in 2008. Several voice actors had worked on other tri-Ace titles in the past. Beyond merely being given directions for their performances, the actors were able to contribute to the characters' personalities. Many characters were revised based on suggestions given by their voice actors during recording. The cast enjoyed their experience, as the game gave them the opportunity for a large range of performances, from comedic to dramatic scenes. Overall, the production process for both actors and development staff was a positive one. The English voice recording began in August 2009 under the supervision of Sega. Recording took place at studios in Los Angeles, and was overseen by Shimano and Suguro. Speaking about his view of the three main actors, Shimano was impressed, praising DiCocco's range and expression for Leanne and noting Menville's performances as Zephyr required fewer retakes than other actors.

=== Release ===
Resonance of Fate was first hinted at prior to April 2009, then announced as an untitled "mystery" RPG at the beginning of the month. According to Shimano, its codename "Project Cobra" had been bandied about prior to the reveal, but no-one had suspected anything about its true nature. Its official Japanese title, along with details such as tri-Ace's partnership with Sega, were unveiled on April 8, 2009. Resonance of Fate marked the first collaboration between tri-Ace and Sega—most of tri-Ace's previous games had been published by Square Enix. The reason for the choice was two-fold: tri-Ace wanted a different publisher due to the radical nature of their new game, and Sega wanted a title to break into the RPG market. As Resonance of Fate seemed unique enough to stand out in the market, Sega agreed to take up publishing duties. According to staff, the Japanese title was originally going to be either Resonance of Fate or Resonance of Time, but Sega asked it to be changed to End of Eternity. This fell in line with a trend among many Japanese games of referencing endings in their titles. It was officially announced for a Western release in May 2009. The game debuted in Japan on January 28, 2010, with a March release in North America and PAL regions. The European version came with text localization in English, French, German, Spanish and Italian.

== Reception ==
Reception

Aggregate score
Aggregator	Score
Metacritic	PS3: 72/100; X360: 74/100

Review scores
Publication	Score
Eurogamer	8 out of 10
Famitsu	34 out of 40
GameSpot	8.5 out of 10
GameTrailers	8.0 out of 10
IGN	7.0 out of 10
PlayStation: The Official Magazine	3.5/5
RPGFan	88%

Resonance of Fate received "mildly positive" reviews, according to video game review aggregator Metacritic. The game launched in Japan with 145,000 copies sold in the first week across both platforms but dropped off Media Create's top 30 list within a month. Critics were most vocal in their praise of the gameplay and battle system. Eurogamer called its innovative design "one of the most inspired approaches to the role-playing video game seen in a decade." IGN stated that "the battle system in Resonance of Fate is strong enough to hold everything together" and added "the unique combat system steps up to be the star of the show." GameSpot noted that "the cinematography used during hero actions is so over-the-top and exciting to watch that it makes battles a joy to take part in." USgamer also lauded the faster pace of the combat system and its emphasis on teamwork to win battles. But some reviewers noted that "the flow of combat in Resonance of Fate is initially confusing, especially if you don't take the optional tutorial." The game was the runner-up for RPGamer's Best Battle System award.

Outside of the battle system, GameSpot commented that the world map's "sparsely detailed overhead view gives the impression of a board game, and you need to employ a puzzle-game mind-set to effectively use your limited pieces to clear the appropriate number of tiles. It's an interesting way to open up new places to explore, and it even ties in to the combat". Critics also praised the weapon customization system, "the weapon upgrade system puts a unique spin on traditional standards. Although you do earn the occasional new gun, you spend more time enhancing your current firearm." RPGamer gave the game its Most Original award, for presenting "a gaming experience unlike any this past year", including a "unique battle system" emphasizing tactical combat, the strategic way in which "the world map was opened up", the ability to "modify almost every aspect of the characters' appearances", and "the way that its story is told." The game was the second runner-up for RPGamer's Best Console RPG and Most Overlooked awards.

The story, on the other hand, received mixed reviews though some critics looked past these flaws. GameSpot wrote that "the story in Resonance of Fate is told in a drawn-out, stilted way that only reveals its agenda dozens of hours into your quest" but what "makes this story engaging even before your ultimate goal becomes clear is that the characters are well-developed and easy to relate to," concluding that the "quirky story provides laughs and drama." Destructoid noted that "Resonance of Fate builds its world mostly through inference and implication rather than exposition" and added "the main plot being somewhat threadbare, it never really ascends to the kind of epic scale one would expect from the genre." RPGamer praised the storytelling, stating that it uses "a futuristic sci-fi setting as a backdrop to tell the story of its main characters" who are "trying to survive in a futuristic world gone mad." It chose the game as the runner-up for its Best Script award, for bringing the "characters to life" and "doing an amazing job with the localization." The game was also the runner-up for RPGamer's Best Voice Acting award.

Critics were also divided about the game's graphics and pacing. Destructoid stated that "while detailed, most environments alternate between concrete gray and brick red." GameSpot echoed criticism of the "lack of visual variety." IGN added that "the world map and dungeons are crying for more detail." Despite this, Destructoid allowed that "the colorful clothing helps offset the game's otherwise limited palette." IGN disliked the fact that "large difficulty spikes are interjected every now and then" and "Resonance of Fate is built for those that enjoy the grind." In contrast, the GameSpot reviewer liked this aspect of the game, "You need to use every trick you have learned, and a few you may not have even realized yet, to tackle these treacherous monsters, but there is nothing quite as sweet as toppling something that has tormented you for so long."

== Legacy ==
An artbook titled End of Eternity Design Works was released on June 11, 2010, in Japan. Published by Enterbrain, Inc., this 176-page artbook is divided in four chapters: Character, Enemy, World view and Benefits.

Resonance of Fate characters and costumes make appearances in a number of other Sega games. In 2010's Hatsune Miku: Project DIVA 2nd, Vocaloid Kagamine Rin can obtain a Leanne outfit. Zephyr, Vashyron, and Leanne are the three characters representing Resonance of Fate in Project X Zone, a Namco-Capcom-Sega mega-crossover video game for the Nintendo 3DS. Zephyr and Leanne are a Pair Unit while Vashyron is a Solo Unit. Various enemies from Resonance of Fate also appear as enemy units. The trio returns in Project X Zone 2, this time with Zephyr and Vashyron being the Pair Unit and Leanne as the Solo Unit. Cardinal Garigliano also appears in the game as a non-playable character.

In 2012, Jostein Johnsen of 1UP.com credited the game with redefining the turn-based battle system, attempting to turn it "into an interactive animated film." According to Johnsen, what "we are really seeing here is a proto-attempt at a live and interactive animated sequence. A sequence where the player decides what happened, and what attacks were used to slay the cardboard cutouts on the left." He credited the game for "saving the JRPG" and "truly renewing it for more advanced technology."

On September 18, 2018, it was revealed that Resonance of Fate would be re-released on the PlayStation 4 and Microsoft Windows as a "4K/HD Remaster". The release date was October 18, 2018. On October 29, 2026, a second remaster for PlayStation 5 and Microsoft Windows was announced and released the same day.
