= Sakura Wars (2019 video game) =

2019 video game

- Developers: Sega CS2 R&D
- Publisher: Sega
- Director: Tetsuya Otsubo
- Producer: Tetsu Katano
- Programmer: Hisao Koba
- Artists: Tite Kubo; Yukiko Horiguchi; BUNBUN; Ken Sugimori; Fumikane Shimada; Keiichi Matate; Noizi Ito; Shigenori Soejima
- Writers: Jiro Ishii; Takaaki Suzuki
- Composer: Kohei Tanaka
- Series: Sakura Wars
- Engine: Hedgehog Engine 2
- Platform: PlayStation 4
- Release: JP/AS: December 12, 2019; WW: April 28, 2020
- Genres: Action role-playing Dating sim Visual novel
- Mode: Single-player

Sakura Wars, known in Japan as New Sakura Wars, (Note: Japanese: 新サクラ大戦, Hepburn: Shin Sakura Taisen) is a cross-genre video game developed and published by Sega for the PlayStation 4. The sixth mainline entry and a soft reboot of the Sakura Wars series, the game was released in 2019 in Asia and 2020 worldwide. It is the first Sakura Wars game not to be developed by Red Entertainment. The gameplay combines overlapping action role-playing, dating sim and visual novel elements. The base campaign was later expanded with downloadable content (DLC), adding further gameplay options such as additional costumes.

The game takes place in a fictionalised version of the Taishō period in 1940, where the World Luxury Operatic Federation fights against those who threaten peace around the world. Naval captain Seijuro Kamiyama is transferred to Tokyo, where he must lead the struggling Imperial Combat Revue through a worldwide tournament of Combat Revues and fight the demons once again.

Development of Sakura Wars began in 2016 after a positive fan response at that year's Sega Fes convention. A combination of new and returning staff were involved in development; these include veteran Sega producer Tetsu Katano, director Tetsuya Otsubo, scenario director Takaharu Terada, music composer Kohei Tanaka, story writer Jiro Ishii, and scenario writer Takaaki Suzuki. Manga artist Tite Kubo designed the main cast, while guest artists handled the supporting cast. The cinematics were produced by Sanzigen. The game was announced at Sega Fes 2018. It is the first mainline entry in the series since Sakura Wars: So Long, My Love (2005). A manga adaptation is running in Young Jump. An anime television series sequel produced by Sanzigen premiered on April 3, 2020. Gameplay-based DLC was released between 2019 and 2020. Upon release, Sakura Wars received mixed reviews from critics, who praised the game for being welcoming to new players as well as for its mix of tactical and story-based gameplay, but criticised it for its combat and some story elements.

== Gameplay ==
An example of how the LIPS system is used in the game. In this shot, Kamiyama is being consulted by the rest of the Flower Division on how they can improve their acting.

Sakura Wars is a cross-genre video game set in Tokyo during a fictionalized version of the Taishō period. The player controls the main protagonist Seijuro Kamiyama and the all-female members of the Imperial Combat Revue's Flower Division, who must fight demons while participating in the Combat Revue World Games. Dubbed a "dramatic 3D action adventure" game, the player explores a fully 3-D version of Ginza, Tokyo usually through a third-person perspective on foot and talks to various characters to trigger main story events and side objectives. As in Sakura Wars: So Long, My Love, the world of Sakura Wars is rendered to scale relative to the characters in it; instead of a caricature of the character roaming around miniature maps, as found in the earlier Sakura Wars games, every area is represented proportionally. A variant of the Kinematron, called the Teletron, is a smartphone that allows Kamiyama to see a map of Ginza and speak with other characters.

As with previous entries, the gameplay is split between adventure segments where Kamiyama explores Ginza and talks to the characters; and battle segments. A returning gameplay element is the traditional "Live & Interactive Picture System" (LIPS); during conversations, the player is presented with multiple choices to select within a time limit. What response the player selects directly affects Kamiyama's relationship with the protagonists and impacts their later performance in battle segments; Kamiyama's responses also affect supporting non-playable characters (NPCs). The version introduced in this game is "Analog LIPS", in which the player can move the camera around and highlight objects or people to trigger more dialogue. In one-on-one conversation segments, the player can move the cursor over background elements or the characters to trigger internal monologues and varying responses from the characters. Players may save their game automatically at the start of the adventure and battle parts of each chapter and manually during intermissions and while exploring, which also includes the statuses of the main heroines as well as supporting NPCs.

Sakura Wars is the first entry in the main Sakura Wars series to use an action-based battle system. Instead of using a menu interface, the player selects commands directly mapped to the buttons on the controller. The Combat Revue World Games can be played for up to a maximum of three rounds. The player can select up to two characters to assist Kamiyama in the matches. During battle, each character has health points (HP) and magic points (MP). HP is depleted whenever a character is attacked. The game ends when all of the characters' HP levels reach zero, although the player can continue from the beginning of the battle or the last checkpoint.

== Synopsis ==
In 1930, two years after the events of So Long, My Love, the Great Demon War results in the annihilation of the Imperial and Paris Combat Revue's Flower Divisions and the New York Combat Revue's Star Division. With Earth at peace and the revues' actions becoming public, the World Luxury Operatic Federation (WLOF) is formed with several international divisions; a biennial Combat Revue World Games tournament has been organized.

Ten years later in 1940, the Combat Revue's commander Sumire Kanzaki (Michie Tomizawa) recruits Imperial Japanese Navy ensign Seijuro Kamiyama (Yōhei Azakami) to become the captain of the new Imperial Combat Revue's Flower Division in Tokyo, which consists of: Sakura Amamiya (Ayane Sakura), a swordswoman; Hatsuho Shinonome (Maaya Uchida), a shrine maiden; Anastasia Palma (Ayaka Fukuhara), a newly transferred Greek actress; Azami Mochizuki (Hibiku Yamamura), a ninja prodigy from the Mochizuki clan; and Clarissa "Claris" Snowflake (Saori Hayami), a Luxembourger noblewoman. The division once again faces a new demon invasion and participates in the upcoming tournament with Xiaolong Yang (Yuichiro Umehara) and Yui Huang (Sumire Uesaka) of the Shanghai Combat Revue, Arthur (Nobunaga Shimazaki) and Lancelot (Manami Numakura) of the London Combat Revue, and Elise (Nana Mizuki) and Margarete (Rie Kugimiya) of the Berlin Combat Revue–while trying to keep their home at the Imperial Theater open.

However, as the tournament progresses, it is later revealed that the leader of the Federation, President G (Ryotaro Okiayu), is actually the demon Sotetsu Genan in disguise. Using his position, Genan steals the Imperial Sword, which is a special artifact Amamiya's mother Hinata (Mariko Kouda) sacrificed herself to create, which the previous Combat Revues used to seal themselves and the Archdemon away in Shadow Tokyo to end the Great Demon War. With the Imperial Sword now in his possession, Genan begins to use it to weaken the barrier between Tokyo and Shadow Tokyo so that he may revive the Archdemon and destroy the world. The Imperial, Shanghai, London, and Berlin Combat Revues work together to take back the Imperial Sword. With assistance from Sakura Shinguji (Chisa Yokoyama), Kamiyama kills Genan while Amamiya uses the Imperial Sword to seal away Shadow Tokyo.

With the threat finally over, the Combat Revues prepare for the World Pageant to celebrate peace.

== Development ==
The Sakura Wars series had been mostly inactive since the last mainline release, Sakura Wars: So Long, My Love, in 2005 (2010 internationally). Franchise owner Sega had decided to end the series in 2008, following the release of the spin-off title Dramatic Dungeon: Sakura Wars and a final concert performance by the cast of So Long, My Love. Scenario director Takaharu Terada would make yearly pitches to Sega, but these were repeatedly declined. At the 2016 Sega Fes in Tokyo, in response to a fan poll about dormant series, Sakura Wars was voted the most requested revival. While actual development had begun shortly before Sega Fes, the positive fan feedback gave the developers the boost they needed to begin full production. The staff included producer Tetsu Katano of Sonic the Hedgehog series fame and director Tetsuya Ohtsubo. Katano was a newcomer to the series, but Ohtsubo had previously worked with the series on Sakura Wars 3: Is Paris Burning?. Because much time had passed between So Long, My Love and the production of this new game, and both the platform and most of the team were different, it was decided that Sakura Wars would be a soft reboot.

The game was developed by a team within Sega's CS Research & Development No. 2 division, which also includes Sonic Team. The basic gameplay was carried over, but extensively reworked and the world built entirely in 3D due to the greater hardware specs of the PlayStation 4. The game's engine was based on Hedgehog Engine 2, a proprietary first-party engine created by Sega for the Sonic the Hedgehog series. The cutscenes were crafted using techniques perfected for Sega's Yakuza series. Alongside the 3D conversion, the team worked to make transitions between different areas and between gameplay and cutscenes as seamless as possible. During production, internal staff who were fans of classic Sakura Wars would often be critical of the current team's work, putting pressure on them to create a product worthy of the series. The game features over 40 minutes of CGI cinematics produced by Sanzigen. All other cutscenes were created in real-time using the game's engine.

While there were a new cast and development team, the series' romanticized steampunk setting remained intact. The narrative was described as a "Sakura Wars-esque fantasy". Terada created the basic setting and scenario concept, the scenario draft was written by Jiro Ishii, while the main script was handled by Takaaki Suzuki. Ishii was contacted in 2016 by Sega. Ishii was initially sceptical about his adequacy to manage the project due to the Sakura Wars franchise's prestige. He accepted as the one who approached him was 428: Shibuya Scramble producer Koichi Nakamura; Ishii recognized that the challenge of Sakura Wars was equivalent to the relationship between 428: Shibuya Scramble and its predecessor Machi. During his work on the scenario, Suzuki offered suggestions to keep the game as historically accurate as possible.

When devising a new battle system for the game, Sega dispensed with the turn-based battle system used in the previous five Sakura Wars games in favor of an action-based system, as they found it to be "the most compatible with the modern PS4 userbase." On being asked about the switch between battle systems, Ohtsubo said that the action genre was "more accessible" as opposed to the simulation genre in Japan.

=== Character design ===
The main characters and their weapons were designed by Tite Kubo, a manga artist best known for the shonen manga Bleach. Kubo had been suggested at an early stage, as the team wanted someone skilled at drawing traditional Japanese clothing for their characters as well as a "fresh take" on the designs to serve as the game's "public face". This wish traced back to the recurring protagonist archetype of a young Japanese woman in a kimono, first with Sakura Shinguji and then new female lead Sakura Amamiya. Kubo was contacted when full production began, and ended up not only designing the characters and weapons but made suggestions for the Kubo designs. Kubo described the character designs as difficult and fun as they did not follow his usual style. The characters were turned into 3D gameplay models by animator Masashi Kudou, who worked on the Bleach anime adaptation. Kubo vouched for Kudou originally, believing only he could carry over the character designs. The Kobu designs were made by regular series mecha designer Mika Akitaka. Other guest artists designed the supporting cast, with different anime artists for different Combat Revue teams and supporting characters. The artists included Yukiko Horiguchi (K-On!) for the Shanghai Combat Revue (Xiaolong Yang & Yui Huang), BUNBUN (Sword Art Online (as abec)) for the London Combat Revue (Arthur & Lancelot), Ken Sugimori (Pokémon) for the Grand Imperial Peanut, Fumikane Shimada (Girls und Panzer) for the Berlin Combat Revue (Elise & Margarethe), Noizi Ito (Haruhi Suzumiya) for Itsuki Saijo, and Shigenori Soejima (Persona) for Hakushu Murasame.

While previous titles had used near-silent protagonists, as the 3D model would have more presence in player minds, it was decided that he should voice all his lines. Kamiyama's role was hard for Azakami, as due to the different LIPS responses he had five times more dialogue than any of the heroines. Sakura's role mirrored earlier principle heroines such as Sakura Shinguji and Gemini Sunrise, but with personality difference that would show her individuality despite emulating Shinguji's clothing and manners. Some characters, such as Sakura and Hatsuho, hearkened back to earlier Sakura Wars heroines while having altered personalities. Azami's loud clothing tied into both her personality and role in the narrative. Anastasia was intended to represent a mature and "sexy" archetype. Claris was included at Terada's insistence to fill the recurring "gentlewoman" archetype.

At one point, the development team and Sega's North American branch asked their European branches to review certain gestures for each character. For example, Sega of Europe's found one of Hatsuho's poses which symbolizes her brash and confident nature as the "American equivalent of the middle finger in some regions of Europe." The developers adjusted the animation accordingly.

Two notable returning actors were Chisa Yokoyama who voiced the character Yaksha and returning character Sakura, and Michie Tomizawa voicing returning character Sumire. Due to changes in their portrayal, recording for the two characters lasted longer than the other staff members. Yokoyama was contacted during early 2018 by Sega about taking part in the game, and was surprised at being asked to voice a new character. She originally refused as she felt the new Yasha could be played by another actress, as while physically identical to her character Sakura Shinguji she had a very different personality. Yokoyama eventually accepted, and worked with Sega to make the character more like the original Sakura. Sumire's role was originally written as being similar to Ayame Fujieda, a severe leader character from the first game, but as voice recording took place the characterization shifted. Tomizawa was initially anxious about reprising her role after reading the story outline, feeling almost like a traitor at being the only original member reprising a role, but was cheered up by Yokoyama's support. Due to input from Tomizawa, Sumire became a more mature version of her original self rather than a radically different character.

=== Music ===
Sakura Wars: Original Soundtrack

Soundtrack album by Kohei Tanaka
- Released: June 24, 2020
- Genre: Video game soundtrack
- Length: 2:41:17
- Label: Sega Music/Wave Master

Regular series composer Kohei Tanaka wrote the music. Because of his long association, Tanaka was happy to return and write for a new Sakura Wars game. When conceiving the project, the team decided firmly that the music was something that should not be changed, as it had helped maintain the series' popularity through stage shows and concerts in Japan during its dormancy. The developers aimed to have the largest number of vocal themes of any Sakura Wars game, ranging between 70 and 80. These included ensemble pieces and solo songs. The main theme was a reworked version of the series' recurring theme "Geki! Teikoku Kagekidan", titled "Geki! Teikoku Kagekidan <Shinshō>" (Note: Japanese: 檄! 帝国華撃団 <新章>) and performed by Ayane Sakura, Maaya Uchida, Hibiku Yamamura, Ayaka Fukuhara and Saori Hayami. The theme was composed by Tanaka and arranged by Takayuki Negishi, with lyrics by series creator Oji Hiroi. The ending song, "Aratanaru" (Note: Japanese: 新たなる), was also composed by Tanaka, arranged by Negishi, written by Jiro Ishii and performed by Sakura, Uchida, Yamamura, Fukuhara, Hayami, Sumire Uesaka, Nana Mizuki and Manami Numakura.

The 2020 soundtrack album, Sakura Wars: Original Soundtrack, (Note: Japanese: 新サクラ大戦 オリジナルサウンドトラック, Hepburn: Shin Sakura Taisen - Orijinaru Saundotorakku) contains 87 tracks of music from the game over a span of three discs. It was published by Wave Master on June 24, 2020. In addition to the original soundtrack album, a vocal collection album was published by Wave Master under the Sega Music brand on April 29, 2020.

== Release ==
A new Sakura Wars title was first announced in April 2018 under the title New Sakura Wars, also known in the west as Project Sakura Wars. The announcement stated that the game would "inherit the DNA" of the series. Its first public appearance was at Sega Fes 2019 in March of that year, to a positive fan response. The announcement of a Western release coincided with this, making Sakura Wars only the second Sakura Wars game to be localized at that time. Development at the time was placed at between 50% and 60% complete; all the scenario and basic systems were completed and voice recording was nearly finished, with the next phase being bringing together the various elements and polishing them for release. Speaking in a later statement, Sega said that they hoped to continue the series beyond Sakura Wars.

During the localization process, associate producer Andrew Davis said that the game was the "perfect chance to give Western players a fresh launching point" and to "reboot the inconsistent English terms from previous localizations throughout the decades." He felt that the trickiest aspects was "coordinating localization on a moving target" and, at one point, the teams "paused [their] translations (and extended [their] production schedule) in order to give the development team more time to finalize their scripts." The process also gave CS2 R&D the chance to "consult with [Sega of America] and other global offices."

A demo of Sakura Wars was released on November 21, 2019. The English localization was handled by Inbound Games and the French, German and Spanish localizations were handled by Keywords Studio; this was the first time a Sakura Wars title was localized in these languages. The game was released in Asia on December 12, 2019, and worldwide on April 28, 2020. Additional fixes to the game were made through a patch released on March 18, 2020, in Japan and concurrently with the worldwide release; it also included a tie-in to Sakura Wars the Animation. The Japanese release of the game was published in standard and deluxe editions. The deluxe edition included a five-disc CD collection containing songs from the main six Sakura Wars games as well as an artbook.

Famitsu released a companion book: the Sakura Wars Complete Guide on February 21, 2020. It provides profiles of the characters and areas in Ginza, the complete story of Sakura Wars, details on the adventure and battle scenarios, and details on each location. Kadokawa Game Linkage released the Sakura Wars Story Setting Collections on March 30, 2020. It included interviews with the developers, detailed character profiles, storyboards and a collection of artworks and illustrations.

Cosmetic and audio-based downloadable content (DLC) were released from December 2019 to January 2020 in Japan.

== Reception ==
Reception

Aggregate score
Aggregator	Score
Metacritic	73/100

Review scores
Publication	Score
Destructoid	7/10
Famitsu	33/40
Game Informer	8/10
GameSpot	7/10
Hardcore Gamer	3.5/5
Push Square	6/10
RPGFan	85%
USgamer	3.5/5
RPGSite	7/10

Sakura Wars received "mixed or average" reviews from critics, according to Metacritic. Japanese gaming magazine Famitsu gave the game a score of 33 points out of 40.

GameSpot's Heidi Kemps praised the game's episodic format. Josh Torres of RPGFan felt that the tête-à-tête feature was "misplaced or implemented in a slipshod fashion". Chris Moyse of Destructoid called the conversations "almost always a pleasure, rarely a chore" and the writing "very funny". Kimberly Wallace of Game Informer called the plot "outlandish", but praised the cast's performances.

Kemps finds that the story compensates for the gameplay, saying "fun character interactions, and high-stakes melodrama help it overcome mediocre action sequences".

=== Sales ===
In Japan, Sakura Wars was ranked second place during its first-week sales behind Pokémon Sword and Shield, selling over 140,376 units. It was the highest-selling new release of the week. Second week sales in the region were 13,532, causing the game to drop to 15th place. As of January 2020, the game has sold 178,426 physical units at retail in Japan. It has also sold an estimated 24,577 digital units in the country, for an estimated total of 203,003 units sold in Japan.

=== Accolades ===
At the 2019 Japan Game Awards, Sakura Wars won the "Future Division" award. The National Academy of Video Game Trade Reviewers (NAVGTR) nominated the game for four awards; period influenced art direction, franchise based role playing game, costume design and original light mix score for a franchise title.

== Media adaptations ==
=== Printed adaptations ===
A manga adaptation of the game's main story started in Weekly Young Jump on September 12, 2019. The manga finished on June 25, 2020. The series follows the events of the story from the perspective of Sakura Amamiya with minor variations from the game. The series was illustrated by Koyuri Noguchi, with three tankōbon volumes released from December 19, 2019, to July 17, 2020.

A light novel prequel, titled Sakura Wars the Novel: Hizakura Season (新サクラ大戦 the Novel ~緋桜のころ~, Shin Sakura Taisen Ji Noberu: Hizakura no Koro; lit. 'New Sakura Wars the Novel: Hizakura Season') was written by Ayumu Mugi and released on December 19, 2019. Set in 1939, the novel focuses on the early lives of Sakura, Hatsuho, Claris, Azami and Anastasia during the formation of the new Flower Division.

=== Anime ===
An anime television series set one year after the game premiered on April 3, 2020, on Tokyo MX and BS11. The series is animated by Sanzigen and directed by Manabu Ono, with Ono and Tatsuhiko Urahata handling series composition, and Kohei Tanaka composing the music. Mika Pikazo, Masashi Kudo, Takuya Chanohara, and Tatsuya Fukushima are designing the characters. The main cast reprised their roles from the game. The series is licensed in North America by Funimation for a simulcast release, and in Southeast Asia and South Asia by Medialink.

=== Stage play ===
A stage adaptation of the game ran from November 19–23, 2020, at Sogetsu Hall, with Yuna Sekine starring as Sakura Amamiya. It was originally planned to run from March 5–8, but on February 26, Sega announced that the event would be delayed to November because of the COVID-19 pandemic.

== Potential Sequel ==
In a September 2026 interview, Oji mentioned that the story for a Sakura Wars 6 was already written by him after he spoke about it in August 2026 at the "Sega Universe Playground" event.
