= Kohei Tanaka (composer) =

Japanese composer, arranger and singer

- Born: February 14, 1954 (age 72); Osaka Prefecture, Japan
- Education: Tokyo University of the Arts; Berklee College of Music
- Occupations: composer; arranger; singer-songwriter; conductor
- Musical career
- Genres: Anime rock; classical rock; film scores; video games
- Instruments: vocals; piano
- Years active: 1982–present
- Labels: Nippon Columbia; Victor Entertainment; Avex Group; Imagine

Kohei Tanaka (Japanese: 田中 公平, Hepburn: Tanaka Kōhei; born February 14, 1954) is a Japanese composer, arranger, conductor and singer-songwriter. He is affiliated with the music production company Imagine. He has created numerous musical scores for anime television series, OVAs, films, video games and tokusatsu series including Choushinsei Flashman, Gunbuster, Sakura Wars, The King of Braves GaoGaiGar, Betterman, and One Piece.

== Biography ==
Tanaka was a student at Berklee College of Music. While employed playing the piano in a hotel lounge, he was requested to arrange a song in Arcadia of My Youth: Endless Orbit SSX, a 1982 TV anime, and it became his first work as a composer. Afterwards, he produced some songs and arrangements for the Super Sentai series and his first work as a lead composer was for the television anime Konpora Kids in 1985.

Notably, the background music in Gunbuster made his name and talent very famous among anime fans and is recognized as one of his most important works. He also handled the composition of Diebuster, a sequel series of Gunbuster, and showed a peculiar arrangement to his own work 17 years ago.

He hosted the Dai Anime Hakurankai radio show on Tokai Radio together with the voice actress Konami Yoshida from April 1993 to September 1994. His discussions with Toshio Okada and Hiroshi Yamamoto about anime, originally published in the hm3 voice acting magazine, have been republished in book form.

On February 14, 2008, he opened an official website and announced his intention to work also as a singer in the future. On July 4, he released his first solo album called Kokorone song 1st.

== Works ==
=== Anime ===
Year	Title	Crew role	Notes	Source
1985–86	Button Nose	Music		
1986	Dragon Ball	Theme song arrangement	"Makafushigi Adventure!", "Romantic Ageru yo"	
1986	Doteraman	Music		
1986	Choushinsei Flashman	Music		
1987	Esper Mami	Music		
1987	Maps	Music	OVA	
1987	The Three Musketeers	Music		
1987–89	Lady!! series	Music	Also Hello! Lady Lynn	
1988–89	Gunbuster	Music		
1988	Patlabor	Music	OVAs	
1989–92	The Laughing Salesman	Music		
1989	Wataru Majinzan	Music	OVA	
1989	Chimpui	Music		
1990–91	Brave Exkaiser	Music		
1990	Obatarian	Music		
1990	Madō King Granzort: The Final Magical Battle	Music	OVA	
1991–93	Matchless Raijin-Oh	Music	Also OVA in 1992	
1991	Honō no Tenkōsei	Music	OVA	
1991	Otaku no Video	Music		
1992	Bastard!!	Music		
1992	Spirit of Wonder: Miss China's Ring	Music		
1993	Dragon Half	Music	OVA	
1993	Yaiba	Music		
1994	Mobile Fighter G Gundam	Music		
1995	Gulliver Boy	Music		
1996	Mobile Suit Gundam: The 08th MS Team	Music	OVA	
1996	Brave Command Dagwon	Music		
1996	Violinist of Hameln	Music, Composer		
1997	The King of Braves GaoGaiGar	Music, Composer		
1999	Pokémon The Movie 2000	Composer	Insert song 1	
1999–present	One Piece	Music	with Shiro Hamaguchi	
1999–2000	Sakura Wars: The Radiant Gorgeous Blooming Cherry Blossoms	Music	OVA	
2000–2003	The King of Braves GaoGaiGar Final	Music Composer	OVA	
2000	Gate Keepers	Music		
2000	Sakura Taisen	Music	TV series	
2001	Angelic Layer	Music		
2001	Gundam Evolve	Music	with others	
2002	Tenchi Muyo! GXP	Music		
2002	Gate Keepers 21	Music	OVA	
2002–03	Overman King Gainer	Music		
2002	Monkey Typhoon	Music		
2003	Sakura Taisen: Ecole de Paris	Music		
2003	Gad Guard series	Music		
2004–07	Kaiketsu Zorori series	Music		
2004	Desert Punk	Music		
2004	Sakura Taisen: Le Nouveau Paris	Music	OVA	
2004	Diebuster	Music	OVA	
2006	Buso Renkin	Music		
2007	Sakura Taisen: New York, New York	Music	OVA	
2007–08	Let's Go! Tamagotchi	Music		
2007	Tamagotchi: The Movie	Music		
2008	Rosario + Vampire series	Music	2 seasons, with Shiro Hamaguchi	
2009	Hayate the Combat Butler	Composer, Arranger		
2010–11	Nura: Rise of the Yokai Clan series	Music	Demon Capital with Kazuhiko Sawaguchi and Keiji Iuchi	
2012	Hyouka	Music		
2012	JoJo's Bizarre Adventure	Theme song composition	"JoJo (Sono Chi no Sadame)"	
2013	Gaist Crusher	Music	with Takayuki Negishi	
2015	Assassination Classroom	Theme song arrangement		
2017	The Laughing Salesman New	Music		
2018	Planet With	Composer, Arranger		
2020	Sakura Wars: The Animation	Music		
2020	Princess Connect Re:Dive	Theme song arrangement		
2020	Motto! Majime ni Fumajime Kaiketsu Zorori	Music		
2021	Back Arrow	Music		
2021	D_Cide Traumerei the Animation	Music		
2024	Grendizer U	Music		

=== Films ===
Year	Title	Crew role	Notes	Source
1988	Esper Mami: Hoshizora no Dancing Doll	Music		
1989	Dorami-chan: Mini-Dora SOS!!!	Music	Doraemon short film	
1990	Chinpui: Eri-sama Katsudō Daishashin	Music		
1993	Dorami-chan: Hello, Dynosis Kids!!	Music	Doraemon short film	
2001	One Piece: Clockwork Island Adventure	Music		
2001	Sakura Wars: The Movie	Music Director		
2002	One Piece: Chopper's Kingdom on the Island of Strange Animals	Music		
2003	One Piece The Movie: Dead End no Bōken	Music	with Shiro Hamaguchi	
2004	One Piece: The Cursed Holy Sword	Music	with Shiro Hamaguchi	
2005	One Piece: Baron Omatsuri and the Secret Island	Music		
2006	Giant Mecha Soldier of Karakuri Castle	Music	with Fuminori Iwasaki	
2007	One Piece Movie: The Desert Princess and the Pirates: Adventures in Alabasta	Music	with Shiro Hamaguchi, Fuminori Iwasaki, Minoru Mauro, Kazuhiko Sawaguchi	
2008	Episode of Chopper Plus: Bloom in the Winter, Miracle Cherry Blossom	Music	with Shiro Hamaguchi	
2008	Tamagotchi: Happiest Story in the Universe!	Music	Film with Shiro Hamaguchi	
2009	One Piece Film: Strong World	Music	with Shiro Hamaguchi	
2012	One Piece Film: Z	Music	with Shiro Hamaguchi	
2012	Kaiketsu Zorori Da-Da-Da-Daibouken!	Music		
2013	Kaiketsu Zorori: Mamoru ze! Kyouryuu no Tamago	Music		
2015	Kaiketsu Zorori: Uchū no Yūsha-tachi	Music		
2019	One Piece: Stampede	Music		

=== Video games ===
Year	Title	Crew role	Notes	Source
1990	Wizardry V: Heart of the Maelstrom	Music	FM Towns version	
1992	Xardion	Music		
1992	Paladin's Quest	Music		
1992	Just Breed	Music		
1993	Tengai Makyo: Fuun Kabukiden	Music		
1995	Tengai Makyō Zero	Music		
1996	Lennus II	Music		
1996	Sakura Wars	Music		
1997	Alundra	Music		
1998	Dragon Force II: Kamisarishi Daichi ni	Music	Main song	
1998	Sakura Wars 2: Thou Shalt Not Die	Music		
1999	Alundra 2	Music		
1999	Gate Keepers	Music		
2001	Sakura Wars 3: Is Paris Burning?	Music		
2002	Sakura Wars 4: Fall in Love, Maidens	Music		
2005	Sakura Wars: So Long, My Love	Music		
2010	Resonance of Fate	Music	with Motoi Sakuraba	
2012	Gravity Rush	Music		
2017	Gravity Rush 2	Music		
2018	Princess Connect! Re:Dive	Music	with others	
2019	One Piece: World Seeker	Music		
2019	Sakura Wars	Music		

== See also ==
- List of video game musicians
