= Sakura Wars: So Long, My Love =

2005 video game

- North American cover art
- Developers: Sega GE2 R&D (Note: Ported to the Wii by Idea Factory); Red Entertainment
- Publishers: JP: Sega; NA/EU: NIS America (Note: Distributed by Tecmo Koei)
- Director: Takehiko Akaba
- Producer: Masakatsu Watanabe
- Designer: Shinpei Tanaka
- Programmer: Fumihito Kondo
- Artists: Kōsuke Fujishima; Hidenori Matsubara
- Writer: Satoru Akahori
- Composer: Kohei Tanaka
- Series: Sakura Wars
- Platforms: PlayStation 2, Wii
- Release: PlayStation 2: JP: July 7, 2005; NA: March 30, 2010; Wii: NA: March 30, 2010; EU: April 9, 2010
- Genres: Tactical role-playing, dating sim, visual novel
- Mode: Single-player

Sakura Wars: So Long, My Love (Note: Known in Japan as Sakura Wars V: Farewell, My Love (Japanese: サクラ大戦V 〜さらば愛しき人よ〜, Hepburn: Sakura Taisen Faibu: Saraba, Itoshiki Hito yo)) is a cross-genre video game developed by Sega and Red Entertainment for the PlayStation 2, with a later port for the Wii developed by Idea Factory. The fifth installment in the main Sakura Wars series, it was released in 2005 in Japan by Sega, and in 2010 in North America and Europe by NIS America, being the first Sakura Wars game to be localized in English. Defined as a "dramatic adventure" game, So Long, My Love combines overlapping tactical role-playing, dating sim and visual novel gameplay elements.

Set in a fictionalized version of the late 1920s, the game follows Japanese naval lieutenant Shinjiro Taiga, who is dispatched to New York City to train with the New York Combat Revue, a troop of magically-imbued women who defend the city from supernatural threats while also working as a theater company. Shinjiro must prove himself worthy to lead the Combat Revue as they try to stop Oda Nobunaga from world domination. The narrative is divided between the Combat Revue's fight against demonic forces and each member's personal struggles.

The game began development following the release of Sakura Wars 4: Fall in Love, Maidens for the Dreamcast in 2002. The setting of New York was originally intended for Fall in Love, Maidens, but the discontinuation of the Dreamcast resulted in the planned story for Fall in Love, Maidens being reworked for the next mainline entry. So Long, My Love was produced by Masakatsu Watanabe and directed by veteran Sega designer Takehiko Akaba with series creator Oji Hiroi as general producer. The script was written by Satoru Akahori, the characters were designed by Hidenori Matsubara based on concept artwork by Kōsuke Fujishima, and the music was composed by Sakura Wars composer Kohei Tanaka.

The game was announced in 2002 as part of the seven-game Sakura Wars World Project. NIS America's localization took two years to complete, being their longest and largest project at the time. The game was well received by critics, but sold poorly compared to previous Sakura Wars games. Sega decided to place the franchise on hiatus in 2008. So Long, My Love was the last entry until 2019 with the release of Sakura Wars, a soft reboot featuring new production staff.

== Gameplay ==
The two main gameplay modes of Sakura Wars are social interaction using the LIPS system (above), and turn-based strategic battles which is directly influenced by earlier LIPS interactions (below).

Sakura Wars: So Long, My Love is a cross-genre video game in which the player controls Shinjiro Taiga and the all-female New York Combat Revue, who must stop the main antagonist Oda Nobunaga from world domination. Dubbed a "dramatic adventure" game and taking place across eight chapters, the gameplay segments incorporate tactical role-playing, dating sim and visual novel elements. Gameplay is divided between adventure segments where Shinjiro explores a 3D-rendered version of New York—including the interior of the Littlelip Theater—, and battle segments governed by a turn-based battle system across a three-dimensional (3D) area allowing full range of movement. Players may also save their game during eyecatches.

In adventure mode, Shinjiro can both navigate New York on his own and bring along a member of the New York Combat Revue. During these sequences, when talking with both the main heroines and supporting characters, conversations rely on the series' traditional Live & Interactive Picture System (LIPS). When faced with critical choices in the course of a conversation, up to three dialogue options are displayed with a time limit for the player to input a response. Depending on the type of response, the character may respond positively or negatively, impacting the relationship and future interactions. An additional "Analog LIPS" option has a single response with analogue input which changes the intensity of Shinjiro's voice, which further affects characters' reactions. Other actions within LIPS include holding the cursor over parts of a character's portrait to trigger internal monologues and varying responses from the characters, and quick time events relying on moving the control sticks and button inputs. If Shinjiro has a strong-enough bond with one of the heroines, he can initiate a romance, unlocking a character-specific ending once the main story is finished. When exploring New York, Shinjiro can access a device called the Cameratron, a device which can both be used as a communication device with members of the Littlelip Theater and take photographs around the city.

In battle mode, the player controls the New York Combat Revue as they battle demonic forces using machines dubbed Super Telekinetic Assault Robots (STARs). Battles take place within 3D arenas and use the traditional Active & Realtime Machine System (ARMS). The player moves each unit within the limits of an Action point meter. Each unit has their own turn, with each turn allowing two actions. These actions include "Attack", "Defend", "Move", "Deathblow" (a critical strike that kills an enemy in one hit), Charge (store energy for a more powerful action during the next turn), and Heal (which restores health points to a chosen unit). Different units specialize in different skills, such as support actions, melee attacks, or distance attacks—along with their range of movement, each unit also has an independent range in which they can perform actions. LIPS interactions in between combat segments raised each heroine's statistics, allowing a greater range of movement, and unlocking more powerful abilities and combination attacks. Should a character fall in battle, the relationship will suffer, weakening their future combat ability. The game ends when Shinjiro's STAR is destroyed or when certain conditions are not met. In addition to ground-based battles, STAR units can convert into a flying form, enabling mid-air battles using identical mechanics to the ground battles.

== Plot ==
In 1928, Shinjiro Taiga departs from Tokyo to New York City at the request of his uncle, Imperial Combat Revue Commander Ichiro Ogami. Shortly after arriving there, Shinjiro witnesses a bank robbery being foiled by Gemini Sunrise, a samurai cowgirl. Shinjiro is captured, but is bailed and led to the Littlelip Theater to meet his captain, Ratchet Altair, and the Star Division's commander, Michael Sunnyside. Taiga and Gemini meet each other in Midtown Manhattan, and then head to Greenwich Village, where Shinjiro's apartment is based. Ratchet then introduces Shinjiro to the rest of the Combat Revue, which consists of Cheiron Archer (Sagiitta Weinberg) and Subaru Kujo. Shinjiro then learns that Ogami was to be in New York in place of Shinjiro. Shinjiro is assigned by Sunnyside to be an usher until he can return to Japan. While at Central Park, Shinjiro meets Diana Caprice, who helps Shinjiro acclimate himself with the city. Eventually, while the New York Combat Revue battles with demon forces at the Statue of Liberty led by Ranmaru, a recurring antagonist in the game, Ratchet is seriously injured and Shinjiro assumes command.

After thwarting Ranmaru's invasion, Shinjiro becomes the New York Combat Revue's Captain-in-Training and Ratchet fills the role of Vice Commander. In between subsequent missions against powerful demonic beings allied with Ranmaru, Shinjiro becomes involved in the personal lives and struggles of the growing New York Combat Revue—which grows to include Diana and Mexican bounty hunter Rosarita Aries (Rikaritta Aries). He gains their trust and can optionally romance one of the members. Gemini is brought into the group once her connection to a group called the Five Star Warriors is revealed. After learning of Ranmaru, who defeated and killed most of the Five Star Warriors, Gemini's sister Geminine—who resides in her body as an alter-ego—plots to exact revenge for her master's death. Shinjiro persuades Geminine not to go through with it. Afterwards, subduing an attack led by Ranmaru, Geminine decides to rest inside Gemini after using too much of her influence to dominate Gemini's body.

Following Christmas, Ranmaru's master Oda Nobunaga summons his base Azuchi Castle in an attempt to dominate the city. Using their airship, the Ahab, to invade Azuchi Castle, the Combat Revue destroy the remains of Ranmaru's robot, only for Shinjiro to be severely injured by Nobunaga. After he recovers and helps the Star Division repel an attack on Little Lip Theater, a plain dubbed the Sixth Heaven appears over New York. After resolving to fight Nobunaga without sacrificing anyone to the Five-Ring Mandala, the only known method to seal Nobunaga, Shinjiro is promoted to the rank of Captain and leads the assault. Making a final stand against Nobunaga, the Star Division defeats him, then Nobunaga decides to rest inside Shinjiro to better understand human feelings. Shinjiro accepts the offer, Nobunaga disappears and his castle disintegrates into cherry blossoms. The final celebration and ending vary depending on whether Shinjiro romanced a member of the Combat Revue.

== Development ==
So Long, My Love was co-developed by Red Entertainment and Sega's Global Entertainment Research & Development No. 2 division. General producer Oji Hiroi, and scenario writer Satoru Akahori and composer Kohei Tanaka reprised their roles from the previous games. So Long, My Love was directed by Takehiko Akaba and produced by Masakatsu Watanabe. Kōsuke Fujishima created the design drafts, while regular series character designer Hidenori Matsubara fleshed out Fujishima's designs. The anime sequences were directed by Shunsuke Tada and produced by M.S.C.

The setting of New York was originally planned for the series' second Dreamcast entry as part of a plan to continue original protagonist Ichiro Ogami's worldwide travels. When Sega announced that the Dreamcast would cease production, the development team decided to turn the game into a celebratory title for series fans and a finale for the series on Sega consoles. This concept became Sakura Wars 4: Fall in Love, Maidens, with the New York setting being moved to the next entry for the PlayStation 2. Based on both staff wishes and feedback from Sakura Wars 3: Is Paris Burning?, the team expanded the adventure and combat segments with additional functions. The adventure portions were improved, with the ability to visit famous landmarks across Manhattan Island being included based on feedback about the inability to visit locations such as the Eiffel Tower and Arc de Triomphe in Sakura Wars 3. Aerial battles were implemented into the ARMS segments inspired by the wing and feather motifs included on machines from earlier entries, in addition to getting an aerial view of New York's sly line.

New York was chosen by Hiroi as a natural progression after moving from Tokyo to Paris for the story of Sakura Wars 3, the development of which informed Hiroi about the direction he wanted to take future entries. The portrayal of New York as a vibrant land of opportunity was linked to the common phrase "I Love New York". As with other entries, the New York Combat Revue was created by Hiroi as a fantastical defence against the ingrained darkness that exists within major cities. According to Akahori, while the game only spanned eight episodes compared to the ten-to-eleven of previous entries, it had far more story content than the previous full-scale entry Sakura Wars 3. The scenario originally spanned eleven episodes, with the additional content featuring Tutankhamun as a villain and using a storyline involving Cleopatra. Due to what were described as "unavoidable circumstances", these episodes were cut from the game, reducing the scenario to its current length. The subtitle was taken from Farewell, My Lovely, a crime novel by American writer Raymond Chandler.

Gemini and Cheiron were the first characters to be created for the game. Gemini became the central heroine who would represent the Redneck stereotype, while the African American Cherion acted as a means for the story to tackle issues of discrimination in American culture. Each additional character was based around a particular theme; Rosarita was themed around Spaghetti Western culture, Subaru was a cold perfectionist similar to Sakura Wars 2 heroine Reni Milchstrasse, while Diana would be a handicapped character in a similar vein to Lobelia from Sakura Wars 3. Ratchet, who had appeared in Sakura Wars: The Movie, was also included as a principal character and romance option, with her voice actress Akiko Kuno returning. As with previous entries, the actresses were chosen based on a combination of acting and singing experience. Rather than established protagonist Ichiro Ogami, the story focused on new protagonist Shinjiro. According to Hiroi, Shinjiro was the most difficult character to create, with the main aim being to differentiate his story from that of Ogami. Shinjiro was made a more vulnerable, emotional character. The renewed cast played into the theme of a young country, whose actions would be performed in parallel to events in Japan. Fujishima was initially confused about the kind of cast Hiroi wanted, drawing multiple versions of each character. Speaking about his design for Gemini, Fujishima described it as having a samurai core within a stylized cowgirl.

=== Audio ===
Tanaka returned as the main composer, a role he had fulfilled since the first Sakura Wars. Given the series' longevity, the hardest thing for Tanaka and Hiroi, who had always acted as the lyricist, was to make each game's music fresh. So Long, My Love was Tanaka's first attempt to shift the musical style following Sakura Wars 4. When composing the theme song, Tanaka was asked by Hiroi to create a theme surpassing those created for the previous mainline entries. The theme, "Chijou no Senshi", was created using jazz instrumentation. It was not hard to make, but technically proved difficult for the singers to perform. Voice recording for the main game and the recording of character songs began in July 2004.

== Release ==
So Long, My Love was first announced in July 2002 at a press conference dedicated to the Sakura Wars series, hosted by Sega and Red Entertainment at the Grand Prince Hotel Akasaka. Given a provisional 2004 release window, it was stated to continue narrative elements started in Sakura Wars: The Movie in addition to having a brand new cast. The game was eventually released in Japan on July 7, 2005 as Sakura Wars V: Farewell, My Love. A Hangul translation was published in South Korea by Sega's local branch on February 16, 2006.

=== Localization ===
Before 2010, So Long, My Love was not released outside Japan. Hiroi had wanted to bring Sakura Wars overseas, but the series was kept exclusive to Japan due to Sega's uncertainty about whether the game's blend of genres would find a profitable audience in the West. Sega had attempted its own localization efforts, but stalled during the concept approval process. No official reason was ever given. A separate attempt to localize the PlayStation Portable port of the first two Sakura Wars games were also canceled. When So Long, My Love was first announced in 2002, Hiroi stated that it, along with other Sakura Wars games surrounding it, were planned from the outset for release in the West. A localization was confirmed in 2008 by NIS America during an interview, although they did not specify what company was handling it. It was noted that at the time the Western market was more open to games such as Sakura Wars following the success of Ar Tonelico: Melody of Elemia and Persona 4.

The localization was a collaboration between Red Entertainment, NIS America and Idea Factory. Red Entertainment and Idea Factory had a long-standing positive working relationship, so when Idea Factory revealed NIS America's wish to publish Sakura Wars overseas, Red Entertainment decided on the collaboration. So Long, My Love was the first Sakura Wars game to be officially translated into English, dropping the Roman numeral. The choice of the fifth entry in the series was due to being the most recent and featuring a new cast, making it an easy entry point for series newcomers. Describing the difficulty with licensing the series for Western release, NIS America explained that Sony classified Sakura Wars as a text novel rather than a game, making importing and licensing difficult at the time.

The game's translation and localization were handled by NIS America's Ryuta Sato, while the English script was written by Nick Doerr. Sato also managed the voice recording with Bang Zoom! Entertainment. Every voiced line of dialogue was dubbed into English, with some of the English cast being carried over from NIS America's work on the Disgaea series. Sato praised Bang Zoom!'s extensive casting to find voice actors with authentic accents for the characters; Gemini's actress, Laura Bailey, had a genuine Texan accent, while the actor for Oda Nobunaga had a "slight and genuine Far Eastern flavor in his voice". For special attack quotes, the actors were given props to act out the scenes while recording to get the right feel for their performances. According to Doerr, the basic mannerisms of the cast were already in the Japanese script, with the main challenge being bringing it out in the English version. While the Japanese cast also sing their characters' themes, this could not be managed for the English version.

The team wished from the start to include the Japanese voice track, due to both fan demands and the celebrity status of the original actors in Japan. Fitting both English and Japanese voice tracks onto a single disc was impossible due to space limitations, meaning that two versions of the game were created for release, with both needing to be debugged separately. The Japanese voice edition also had a different text localization, as character names altered in the English dub such as Cherion—called Sagiitta in Japanese—were changed back to their original versions. Due to issues with missed bugs in previous NIS America localizations, the team spent twice the standard period debugging each version. The entire localization process took two years to complete, described by NIS America as being longer than the game's original development. At the time, it was called the largest localization project in the company's history.

The Wii version, released exclusively in the West, was developed by Idea Factory, tapping into the large install base on the console outside Japan. For its Western release, the subtitle was changed and its numeral removed. While originally intended for both the PlayStation 2 and Wii, the PS2 version was the only edition to have Japanese voices on a separate disc, with the Wii version instead being sold at a lower price as a compromise for the lack of the Japanese dub. The game released for PS2 and Wii in North America on March 30, 2010 after multiple delays. In Europe, the game released exclusively for the Wii on April 9 of that year. NIS America acted as publisher in both regions.

== Reception ==
Reception

Aggregate score
Aggregator	Score
Metacritic	PS2: 81/100 (15 reviews); Wii: 75/100 (30 reviews)

Review scores
Publication	Score
1Up.com	B+
Famitsu	37/40
GameSpot	7/10
IGN	9/10
RPGamer	3.5/5
RPGFan	90%

During its first week on sale in Japan, So Long, My Love topped gaming charts with sales of 112,000 units. By the end of 2005, the game was among the top 100 best-selling games of that year, with sales of approximately 144,600 units. Despite these sales figures, as of 2008 the game is the worst-selling main entry in the Sakura Wars series in Japan. While no exact sales figures were released, So Long, My Love was listed by NIS America as one of their titles that sold over 9,999 copies during 2010. NIS America later stated that the game's sales had fallen below expectations in the West.

In their review of the game, Japanese magazine Famitsu gave praise to multiple aspects of the game, including its CGI and anime sequences, adventure segments, combat systems, and character portrayals. Andrew Fitch, writing for 1UP.com, compared the narrative to Urusei Yatsura and Tenchi Muyo! for its light tone and reliance on anime stereotypes, while praising its combat segments and LIPS gameplay, saying it was worth playing despite the age of its gameplay systems. GameSpot's Shiva Stella was positive about the story and characters, anime sequences and relationship mechanics. Her criticism focused on the 3D environments, lack of exploration, and poor implementation of both minigames and combat mechanics.

IGN's Sam Bishop praised the growth of the characters and combination of social and battle mechanics, and despite finding the graphical quality low compared to other games around at the time, said the game should not be overlooked. Mikel Tidwell of RPGamer enjoyed the narrative, character portrayals and anime sequences. Other aspects of the game were found lacking, including the "slow" combat system, lack of free time during adventure segments, and a lack of save points. Patrick Gann of RPGFan, while finding the graphics lacking, praised every other aspect of the game, and cited the localization as NIS America's best at that point. Both Bishop and Gann gave the game their "Editor's Choice" awards as part of their reviews.

== Legacy ==
The main characters of So Long, My Love was featured as part of the playable cast in the 2008 dungeon crawler spin-off Dramatic Dungeon: Sakura Wars — Because You Were There for the Nintendo DS. Gemini Sunrise was later included as a playable character in the 2012 Nintendo 3DS crossover title Project X Zone and its 2015 sequel, representing So Long, My Love alongside characters from the original Sakura Wars and female protagonist Erica Fontaine from Sakura Wars 3.

Sega decided to suspend the franchise in 2008, following the release of Dramatic Dungeon: Sakura Wars. The series was eventually revived in Sakura Wars, released in 2019 in Japan and 2020 internationally. The game was a soft reboot of the franchise, featuring a new cast of characters and new development staff aside from composer Tanaka and Hiroi as lyricist.

A six-episode original video animation (OVA) series, Sakura Wars: New York, New York, was released between April and August 2007. The anime was produced by Anime International Company and directed by Ryuichi Kimura, with Akahori returning to write the scenario and the original cast reprising their roles. For the scenario, Akahori used the cut episodes involving Tutankhamun and Cleopatra from the game's original scenario. The OVA is set after the events of So Long, My Love, showing the New York Combat Revue's conflict with Tutankhamun alongside Shinjiro needing to cross-dress for the role of Cleopatra in the Revue's next musical production.

=== Sakura Wars V Episode 0 ===
In addition to the main game, Sakura Wars V Episode 0: Samurai Daughter of the Wild (Note: サクラ大戦V EPISODE 0〜荒野のサムライ娘〜, Sakura Taisen Faibu Episōdo Zero: Kōya no Samurai Musume) was released on September 22, 2004 for the PlayStation 2. Set as a prequel to the main game, Sakura Wars V Episode 0 starred Gemini as she adventured from Texas across the United States, being posited as a "dramatic action" game forming one half of the full Sakura Wars V storyline. While carrying over the LIPS system, the game was mainly focused around hack and slash action gameplay; Gemini fights on her horse through waves of enemies in story-based stages. Additional characters from earlier Sakura Wars titles could also be unlocked to control in completed missions.

The game was developed by the veteran Sakura Wars team at Overworks, being one of the last games produced by the division under that title prior to internal restructures at Sega. Hiroi acted as executive producer. Tanaka, Matsubara and Akahori returned in their respective roles. The opening was animated by Production I.G. The opening and closing themes were created by Hiroi and Tanaka to be based around Country music, reflecting Gemini's character. First announced in 2002 alongside So Long, My Love under the working title "Sakura Wars V Action", its full title was revealed in September 2003. It was also the first Sakura Wars game to be released in Hong Kong, South Korea and Mainland China, being released simultaneous with its Japanese release. Upon release, Famitsu gave the game a score of 27/40.

=== Sakura Wars World Project ===
Both So Long, My Love and Sakura Wars V Episode 0 formed part of the Sakura Wars World Project, a group of seven games for the PlayStation 2 which included a remake of the original Sakura Wars, two adventure games set in Tokyo and Paris, a prequel set before the original game detailing a pivotal conflict in the series' backstory, and a title set during the Sengoku period intended on expanding the series' mythos. The Sakura Wars remake was released in 2003, and the first adventure title, Sakura Wars Story: Mysterious Paris, released in 2004. The remaining three projects were cancelled in 2008.
