= Michie Tomizawa =

Japanese voice actress (born 1961)

- 富沢 美智恵
- Born: October 20, 1961 (age 65); Maruko, Nagano Prefecture, Japan
- Occupations: Actress; voice actress; singer
- Years active: 1983–present
- Agent: Aoni Production
- Height: 159 cm (5 ft 3 in)
- Spouse: Akira Ito (m. 2002)
- Children: 1

Michie Tomizawa (富沢 美智恵, Tomizawa Michie; born October 20, 1961) is a Japanese actress and singer born in Maruko, Nagano Prefecture and raised in Shinmachi, Gunma.

== Life and career ==
She is most known for the roles of Matsuzaka-Sensei (Crayon Shin-chan), Manami Kasuga (Kimagure Orange Road), Linna Yamazaki (Bubblegum Crisis), Rei Hino / Sailor Mars (Sailor Moon), Sumire Kanzaki (Sakura Wars), and Emi Ogasawara (Ghost Sweeper Mikami).

Tomizawa temporarily retired from voice acting before getting married in 2002. She came out of retirement for 2004's Disgaea and 2006's Black Lagoon. She also appeared in a number of Musical Kayou Shows as her Sakura Taisen character Sumire; she retired from the annual performances after getting married but came back for the 2005 show, the final show in 2006, and the 2007 Budoukan show. Although said to have retired from the Sakura Taisen world, she did, however, appear backstage in scenes of Hanagumi Camera and later on stage during some of the later shows. In 2019, she also reprised her role of Sumire Kanzaki in Shin Sakura Taisen, now as the commander of the Hanagumi and as the Imperial Playhouse's general manager.

She sang a song in Sailor Moon R, "Eien no Melody" (Eternal Melody) written by Noda Kaoru and composed by Mashita Izumi. She has also recorded songs for several Sailor Moon soundtrack albums, including a version of Wham!'s "Last Christmas" (in English) for the Sailor Stars Christmas album. Tomizawa is fluent in English as well as Japanese.

She also returned to the stage of Animelo Summer Live at the Anisama Super Game Song Live 2012 in May 2012 along with fellow Sakura Taisen cast members, Chisa Yokoyama and Urara Takano to perform as the Sakura Taisen Teikoku Kagekidan.

== Personal life ==
She married Akira Ito in 2002.

Although not raised as a Christian, Tomizawa attended Christmas night church services and later converted to Christianity.

== Filmography ==
=== Television animation ===
- The Super Dimension Cavalry Southern Cross (1984): Jeanne Francaix
- Ganbare, Kickers! (1986–1987): Tetsuya
- Kimagure Orange Road (1987): Manami Kasuga
- High School Mystery: Gakuen Nanafushigi (1991): Mizuki Ichijo
- Crayon Shin-chan (1992): Matsuzaka-sensei
- Sailor Moon (1992–1997): Rei Hino / Sailor Mars
- Ghost Sweeper Mikami (1993–1994): Emi Ogasawara
- Saint Tail (1996): Nagata Tomoko
- Those Who Hunt Elves (1996–1997): Airi Komiyama
- Yu-Gi-Oh! (1998): School nurse
- Oruchuban Ebichu (1999): Office Lady
- One Piece (2005): Laki
- Black Lagoon (2006): Roberta
- Magic Kaito (2015): Chikage Kuroba a.k.a. Phantom Lady
- Sakura Wars the Animation (2020): Sumire Kanzaki

Unknown date

- Dr Slump: Akiko
- Kinnikuman: Scramble for the Throne: Bibimba
- Let's Nupu Nupu: Miss Shitara
- Rhapsody: A Musical Adventure and Disgaea: Hour of Darkness: Marjoly
- Sailor Moon video games: Rei Hino / Sailor Mars
- Sakura Wars series: Sumire Kanzaki
- Super Robot Wars Z: Edel Bernal

=== Original video animation ===
- Vampire Hunter D (1985): Doris
- Bubblegum Crisis (1987): Linna Yamazaki
- One Pound Gospel (1988): Sakai
- Bubblegum Crash (1991): Linna Yamazaki
- Legend of the Galactic Heroes (1994): Elfriede von Kohlrausch
- Tenchi Muyo! Ryo-Ohki (2016): Mihoshi Kuramitsu (OVA 4)

=== Animated films ===
- Project A-ko (1986): C-Ko
- Pretty Soldier Sailor Moon R: The Movie (1993): Rei Hino / Sailor Mars
- Pretty Soldier Sailor Moon S: The Movie (1994): Rei Hino / Sailor Mars
- Pretty Soldier Sailor Moon SuperS: The Nine Sailor Soldiers Unite! Miracle of the Black Dream Hole (1995): Rei Hino / Sailor Mars

=== Video games ===
- Sailor Moon games (1994)
- Sakura Wars (series) (1996–Present): Sumire Kanzaki
- Tomb Raider (1997): Jacqueline Natla
- Thousand Arms (1998): Metalia
- Ninja Gaiden (2004): Rachel
- Ninja Gaiden Sigma 2 (2009): Rachel
- Musou Orochi 2 Special (2012): Rachel
- Dead or Alive 5 Ultimate (2013): Rachel
- Dead or Alive 6 (2019): Rachel
- Shin Megami Tensei: Digital Devil Saga* (2004): Jenna Angel
- Shin Megami Tensei: Digital Devil Saga 2* (2005): Jenna Angel

=== Television drama ===
- Oshin (1983): Onatsu

=== Tokusatsu ===
- Choriki Sentai Ohranger (1995): Ms. Hino (Actor) (ep. 5)
- Voicelugger (1999): Eyelash Line (Actor)
- Tokusou Sentai Dekaranger (2004): Yuilwerian Mime (ep. 39)
- Kamen Rider × Kamen Rider × Kamen Rider The Movie: Cho-Den-O Trilogy: Episode Blue: The Dispatched Imagin is NEW tral (2010): Mantis Imagin
- Girls in Trouble: Space Squad Episode Zero (2018) Hellvira (replacing Naomi Morinaga)

=== Dubbing ===
==== Live-action ====
- Baywatch, C. J. Parker (Pamela Anderson)
- The Goonies (1988 TBS edition), Andrea "Andy" Carmichael (Kerri Green)
- Scream 2, Maureen Evans (Jada Pinkett Smith)

==== Animation ====
- Galaxy High, Booey Bubblehead
- The Simpsons, Jessica Lovejoy

=== Others ===
- Machi Chūka de Yarouze (BS-TBS, 2019–present), narrator

== Music ==
As the voice of Sailor Mars from the Sailor Moon series, Tomizawa performed two international Christmas tunes, "White Christmas" and "Last Christmas". These songs also are on the Japanese Sailor Moon Christmas CDs. Both songs are in English.
