= Hybrid genre =

Genre that blends themes and elements from two or more different genres

A hybrid genre is a literary or film genre that blends themes and elements from two or more different genres. Hybrid genre works are also referred to as cross-genre, multi-genre, mixed genre, or fusion genre. Some hybrid genres have acquired their own specialised names, such as comedy drama ("dramedy"), romantic comedy ("rom-com"), horror Western, and docudrama.

A Dictionary of Media and Communication describes hybrid genre as "the combination of two or more genres", which may combine elements of more than one genre and/or which may "cut across categories such as fact and fiction".

Hybrid genres are a longstanding element in the fictional process. An early literature example is William Blake's Marriage of Heaven and Hell, with its blend of poetry, prose, and engravings. In cinema, the merging of two or more separate genres attracts a broader range of audience type.

== Examples ==
=== Literature ===
In contemporary literature, Dimitris Lyacos's trilogy Poena Damni combines fictional prose with drama and poetry in a multilayered narrative developing through the different characters of the work.

Many contemporary women of color have published cross-genre works, including Theresa Hak Kyung Cha, Giannina Braschi, Guadalupe Nettel, and Bhanu Kapil. Giannina Braschi creates linguistic and structural hybrids of comic fantasy and tragic comedy in Spanish, Spanglish, and English prose and poetry. Carmen Maria Machado mixes psychological realism and science fiction with both humor and elements of gothic horror.

Dean Koontz considers himself a cross-genre writer, not a horror writer: "I write cross-genre books-suspense mixed with love story, with humor, sometimes with two tablespoons of science fiction, sometimes with a pinch of horror, sometimes with a sprinkle of paprika..."

=== Film ===
Examples of hybrid genre films include:

- Grease (1978; musical, comedy, romance, coming-of-age)
- Who Framed Roger Rabbit (1988; live action, animation, mystery)
- Back to the Future 3 (1990; science fiction and western)
- Punch-Drunk Love (2002; rom-com, psychological drama, musical, screwball comedy)
- Shaun of the Dead (2004; horror, survival, comedy)
- Let the Right One In (2008; horror (vampire), romance, coming-of-age, Nordic noir)
- Drive (2011; art-house drama, B-movie)
- Deadpool (2016; superhero, action, comedy)
- Elle (2016; erotic thriller, Black comedy, satire)
- Logan (2017; superhero, Western)
- The Killing of a Sacred Deer (2017; horror, Greek tragedy, dark comedy)
- Parasite (2019; comedy, drama, thriller)
- Bones and All (2022; road film, coming-of-age, romance, horror)
- Everything Everywhere All at Once (2022; action, fantasy, sci-fi)
- Sinners (2025; horror (vampire), musical)

=== TV series ===
- Lost (2004–2010; adventure, mystery, science fiction, serial drama, supernatural, survival, thriller)

== List of named hybrid genres ==
- Action comedy (action and comedy)
- Action drama (action and drama)
- Action thriller (action and thriller)
- Action horror (action and horror)
- Comedy drama (comedy and drama)
- Comedy horror (comedy and horror)
- Comedy thriller (comedy and thriller)
- Comic fantasy (comedy and fantasy)
- Comic science fiction (comedy and science fiction)
- Crime drama (crime and drama)
- Crime fantasy (crime and fantasy)
- Dark fantasy (horror and fantasy)
- Docudrama (dramatised documentary)
- Docufiction (documentary and fiction)
- Ethnofiction (ethnography and fiction)
- Fantasy of manners (comedy of manners and fantasy)
- Fantasy Western (fantasy and Western)
- Horror Western (horror and Western)
- Romantic comedy (romance and comedy)
- Romantic fantasy (romance and fantasy)
- Science fantasy (science fiction and fantasy)
- Science fiction Western (science fiction and Western)
- Tragicomedy (tragedy and comedy)
- Zombie comedy (zombie fiction and comedy)

== See also ==
- Genre-busting
- Menippean satire
- Northrop Frye
- Orlando: A Biography
- Slipstream fiction
