= Valkyrie Profile (disambiguation) =

Valkyrie Profile is a video game series developed by tri-Ace and published by Enix (now Square Enix).

- Valkyrie Profile (video game), a 1999 PlayStation game
- Valkyrie Profile: Lenneth, the 2006 PlayStation Portable port
- Valkyrie Profile 2: Silmeria, a 2006 PlayStation 2 game
- Valkyrie Profile: Covenant of the Plume, a 2008 Nintendo DS game
