= Kenji Nomura =

Japanese voice actor (born 1970)

- 乃村 健次
- Born: July 23, 1970 (age 56); Okayama Prefecture, Japan
- Occupation: Voice actor
- Agent: Aksent

Kenji Nomura (乃村 健次, Nomura Kenji; born July 23, 1970) is a Japanese voice actor from Okayama Prefecture affiliated with Aksent. Known for playing characters large in size, he has starring roles in anime shows, including Mitsunori Kugayama in Genshiken, Chairman Harabote in Kinnikuman: Ultimate Muscle, Lorenzo in Ristorante Paradiso, and Gilles de Rais in Drifters. He also voices in a bunch of supporting roles in anime series including Battle Spirits, First Love Limited, Jormungand, Kanokon, Valkyria Chronicles, Yes! PreCure5, and Yu-Gi-Oh! 5D's. He voices several villain characters in One Piece.

== Filmography ==
=== Television animation ===
1996

- Detective Conan (Mamoru Onitsura, Hiroki Oi, Andre Camel (episode 1072-onwards))

1997

- Kindaichi Case Files (Mikihiko Wakaouji)
- Yume no Crayon Oukoku (Prime Minister Chameleon)

1999

- Cybuster (Izaki)
- Ojamajo Doremi (Akira Fujiwara)
- One Piece (Kuromarimo, Braham, Bobby Funk, Jack)

2001

- Baki the Grappler (Yūjirō Hanma)

2002

- The Twelve Kingdoms (Koukan)
- Digimon Frontier (Arbormon, Petaldramon)
- Genma Wars (Katsu - ep 1)
- Kinnikuman the Second (Buffaloman, Scarface, The Adams)

2003

- Ashita no Nadja (Rosso)
- Fullmetal Alchemist (Delfino - ep 11)
- Papuwa (Magic Sōsui, Gustav)
- Peacemaker Kurogane (Harada Sanosuke)
- Zatch Bell! (Big Man, Faust (ep 57), Kiichiro Endō)

2004

- Daphne in the Brilliant Blue (Wong)
- Genshiken (Mitsunori Kugayama)
- Kinnikuman the Second: Ultimate Muscle (Harabote Muscle, Destruction, Tomokazu)
- Samurai Champloo (Villager - ep 17)
- Zipang (Yōkichi Kadomatsu)

2005

- Eyeshield 21 (Makoto Otawara)
- Futakoi Alternative (Gen-san the Tofu Seller)
- Gallery Fake (Shinha)
- Ginga Legend Weed (Hiro, Shōji)
- Honey and Clover (Fujiwara Luigi - ep 14)
- Trinity Blood (Marquis of Hungaria Gyula Kádár)
- Xenosaga: The Animation (Captain Matthews)

2006

- Bakumatsu Kikansetsu Irohanihoheto (Kakashi no Keishin)
- Kinnikuman the Second: Ultimate Muscle 2 (Buffaloman, Harabote Muscle, Tomokazu)
- Super Robot Wars Original Generation: Divine Wars (Masked man)
- Tactical Roar (Kunio Okamachi)
- The Wallflower (Black-suited person - ep 3)

2007

- Bleach (Yammy Llargo)
- GeGeGe no Kitarō (Kimura - ep 5)
- Genshiken OVA (Mitsunori Kugayama)
- Genshiken 2 (Mitsunori Kugayama)
- Moonlight Mile (Capote)
- Shakugan no Shana Second (East-Edge)

2008

- A Certain Magical Index (Toya Kamijo)
- Yu-Gi-Oh! 5D's (Demak)

2009

- Valkyria Chronicles (anime) (Largo Potter)
- Ristorante Paradiso (Lorenzo Orsini)

2010

- A Certain Magical Index II (Toya Kamijo)
- SD Gundam Sangokuden Brave Battle Warriors (Sousou Gundam)

2011

- Beelzebub (Takeshi Shiroyama)
- Shakugan no Shana Final (East-Edge)
- Yu-Gi-Oh! Zexal (Housaku Yasai)

2012

- JoJo's Bizarre Adventure (Santana)
- Jormungand (William Nelson)
- Jormungand Season 2: Perfect Order (William Nelson)
- Uchuu Kyoudai (Takio Azuma)

2014

- Bakumatsu Rock (Otose)
- Akame ga Kill! (Sten)
- Karen Senki (Older Butcher)
- The World is Still Beautiful (Jaina)

2015

- Is It Wrong to Try to Pick Up Girls in a Dungeon? (Gareth Landrock)
- The Testament of Sister New Devil (Valgar)
- The Testament of Sister New Devil Burst (Volga - ep 8)

2016

- Divine Gate (Palomides)
- Re:Zero − Starting Life in Another World (Ricardo Welkin)

2017

- Dragon Ball Super (Toppo)
- Fate/Apocrypha (Kairi Shishigou)
- Mahojin Guru Guru (Satanachis (ep. 10), Boss)

2018

- Cells at Work! (Effector T Cell)
- Golden Kamuy (Tatsuuma Ushiyama)
- A Certain Magical Index III (Toya Kamijo)

2019

- Fairy Gone (Ewan Breeze)
- BEM (Joel Woods)
- Fire Force (Flail)
- The Case Files of Lord El-Melloi II (Kairi Shishigou)
- Special 7: Special Crime Investigation Unit (Rokusuke "Sniper" Endō)

2020

- BNA: Brand New Animal (Kōichi Ishizaki)
- Great Pretender (Lewis Mueller)

2021

- Hortensia Saga (Lugis F. Camellia)
- The Faraway Paladin (Reystov)

2022

- Parallel World Pharmacy (Bruno de Médicis)
- Shinobi no Ittoki (Kurōdo Dazai)

2023

- Giant Beasts of Ars (Guun)
- Mashle (Andrew Olore)
- Undead Unluck (Void)
- Ron Kamonohashi's Forbidden Deductions (Schedule Instructor)

2024

- Fluffy Paradise (Sol)
- Kingdom 5 (Raido)
- Sengoku Youko (Jinun)
- Shibuya Hachi (Moyai)
- Blue Miburo (Hirayama Goro)
- The Seven Deadly Sins: Four Knights of the Apocalypse Season 2 (Macduff)

2025

- Übel Blatt (Dariste)

=== ONA ===
- The Way of the Househusband (2021) (Sawatari Yakuza A)

=== OVA ===
- Hunter x Hunter OVA 3 (2004) (Bopobo, Franklin Bordeaux, Nickes)
- Final Fantasy VII Advent Children (2005) (Loz)
- Strait Jacket (2007) (Reegs)
- King of Thorn (2009) (Ron Portman)
- Air Gear: Kuro no Hane to Nemuri no Mori (2011) (Dontores)

=== Theatrical animation ===
- Crayon Shin-chan: The Storm Called: Operation Golden Spy (2011) (Azuma)
- City Hunter the Movie: Shinjuku Private Eyes (2019) (PMC Captain)
- Detective Conan: Black Iron Submarine (2023) (Andre Camel)

=== Tokusatsu ===
- Seijuu Sentai Gingaman (1998) (Desphias (ep. 33))
- Kyukyu Sentai GoGo Five (1999) (Beast Baron Cobolda (eps. 1 - 48))
- Mirai Sentai Timeranger (2000) (Hell's Gate Prisoner Harbal (ep. 42))
- Kaettekita Tensou Sentai Goseiger last epic (2011) (King Beebi)
- Zyuden Sentai Kyoryuger (2013) (Debo Hyougakki (ep. 1, 20 - 23, 35))
- Kikai Sentai Zenkaiger (2021) (Mobile Commander Barashitara)
- Garo: Higashi no Kairou (2026) (Garzas)

=== Video games ===
2004

- Ace Combat 5: The Unsung War (Captain Marcus Snow)

2005

- Yakuza (Yukio Terada)

2006

- JoJo's Bizarre Adventure: Phantom Blood (Dio Brando (young))
- Valkyrie Profile 2: Silmeria (Brahms)
- Tales of the Tempest (Forest Ledoyen)
- Wild Arms 5 (Nightburn Acklund)

2008

- BlazBlue: Calamity Trigger (Iron Tager)

2009

- Yu-Gi-Oh! 5D's Tag Team Force 4 (Demak)
- BlazBlue: Continuum Shift (Iron Tager)

2011

- Bleach: Soul Resurrection (Yammy Riyalgo)
- Yu-Gi-Oh! 5D's Tag Team Force 6 (Demak)

2012

- Kid Icarus: Uprising (Magna)
- BlazBlue: Chrono Phantasma (Iron Tager)
- 2nd Super Robot Wars Original Generation (Alteur Steinbeck, Euzeth Gozzo)

2015

- Dragon Ball Z: Dokkan Battle (Yammy Llargo)
- BlazBlue: Central Fiction (Iron Tager)

2016

- Yakuza Kiwami (Yukio Terada)
- Overwatch Reinhardt (Japanese Dub)
- Dragon Quest Heroes II (King Dalal)
- Final Fantasy XV (Wedge Kincaid)

2017

- Tales of the Rays (Forest Ledoyen)
- Nobunaga no Yabou Taishi Takeda Shingen
- Yakuza Kiwami 2 (Yukio Terada)

2018

- BlazBlue: Cross Tag Battle (Iron Tager)
- World of Final Fantasy Maxima (The Immortal Dark Dragon)

2019

- Ace Combat 7: Skies Unknown (AWACS Long Caster)
- Starlink: Battle for Atlas (Hunter Hakka)

2020

- One Piece: Pirate Warriors 4 (Jack)

2022

- Fate/Grand Order (Minamoto no Tametomo)

Unknown date

- Ace Combat: Assault Horizon (Doug 'D-Ray' Robinson)
- Armored Core 4 (Berlioz)
- Bullet Witch (Darkness)
- Bleach - Heat the Soul 4 (Yammy)
- Fullmetal Alchemist and the Broken Angel (Trainjacker)
- Fushigi Yūgi: Suzaku Ibun (Ashitare)
- Injustice: Gods Among Us (Uncredited voice)
- Lamento Beyond the Void (Bardo)
- Mega Man Powered Up (Guts Man, Yellow Devil)
- Metroid: Other M (Anthony Higgs)
- Ratchet and Clank series (Captain Qwark)
- Rockman ZX Advent (Diaburn the Gazelroid)
- Sonic Riders (Storm the Albatross)
- Soulcalibur Legends (Barbaros)
- Super Robot Wars UX (Jack Smith, Sousou Gundam)
- Unlimited Saga (Iskandar, Knight of the Round Table)
- Valkyrie Profile: Lenneth (Brahms)
- Valkyrie Profile 2: Silmeria (Brahms, Dylan)
- Saint Seiya Awakening (Bear Geki)

=== Dubbing roles ===
==== Live-action ====
- Djimon Hounsou
  - Blood Diamond (Solomon Vandy)
  - Push (Agent Henry Carver)
  - Elephant White (Curtie Church)
  - Guardians of the Galaxy (Korath)
  - Air (Cartwright)
  - Captain Marvel (Korath)
  - The King's Man (Shola)
  - A Quiet Place Part II (The Man on the Island)
- 100 Streets (Max (Idris Elba))
- 12 Angry Men (VHS edition) (Guard (Tyrees Allen))
- 2 Fast 2 Furious (2006 TV Asahi edition) (Roman Pearce (Tyrese Gibson))
- 300 (The Persian Messenger (Peter Mensah))
- Against the Dark (Tagart (Tanoai Reed))
- Ant-Man (Peachy (Robert Crayton))
- Armageddon (Bear (Michael Clarke Duncan))
- The A-Team (Bosco "B. A." Baracus (Quinton Jackson))
- Battleship (Lieutenant Colonel Mick Canales (Gregory D. Gadson))
- Black Lightning (Jefferson Pierce/Black Lightning (Cress Williams))
- Captain America: The First Avenger (Gabe Jones (Derek Luke))
- Charmed (Drake (Billy Zane))
- Cinderella (Captain (Nonso Anozie))
- Coming 2 America (Reem Junson (Tracy Morgan))
- Dr. Dolittle (Baby alligator)
- Dumbo (Rongo the Strongo (DeObia Oparei))
- Ender's Game (Sergeant Dap (Nonso Anozie))
- The Expendables 2 (Toll Road (Randy Couture))
- The Eyes of Tammy Faye (Jerry Falwell (Vincent D'Onofrio))
- First Sunday (Durell Douglas Washington (Ice Cube))
- Gamer (Hackman (Terry Crews))
- Get Smart (2011 TV Asahi edition) (Agent 91 (Terry Crews))
- The Girl on the Train (Dr. Kamal Abdic (Édgar Ramírez))
- Godzilla (Captain Russell Hampton (Richard T. Jones))
- The Green Hornet (Chili (Chad L. Coleman))
- Halloween: Resurrection (Freddie Harris (Busta Rhymes))
- Happiness (Allen (Philip Seymour Hoffman))
- The Hate U Give (Uncle Carlos (Common))
- Here Comes the Boom (Niko (Bas Rutten))
- His Dark Materials (Iorek Byrnison)
- Hobbs & Shaw (Loeb (Rob Delaney))
- Idiocracy (Secretary of Defense)
- Independence Day: Resurgence (Dikembe Umbutu (DeObia Oparei))
- Inferno (Christoph Bouchard (Omar Sy))
- Invictus (Linga Moonsamy)
- Knockaround Guys (Taylor Reese (Vin Diesel))
- The Mandalorian and Grogu (Hutt sibling (N/A))
- The Mentalist (Dennis Abbott (Rockmond Dunbar))
- Nacho Libre (Ramses (Silver King))
- No Country for Old Men (Carson Wells (Woody Harrelson))
- Obsessed (Derek Charles (Idris Elba))
- Operation Napoleon (Einar (Ólafur Darri Ólafsson))
- Oz (Simon Adebisi (Adewale Akinnuoye-Agbaje))
- Paddington (Grant (Kayvan Novak))
- Pineapple Express (Dale Denton (Seth Rogen))
- Polar Storm (The President of the United States (Roger Cross))
- Power Rangers: Turbo (Goldgoyle, Commander Norquist)
- Power Rangers in Space (Frightwing, Commander Norquist)
- Ra.One (Ra.One (Arjun Rampal))
- Requiem for a Dream (Tyrone C. Love (Marlon Wayans))
- The Resident (AJ "The Raptor" Austin (Malcolm-Jamal Warner))
- Resident Alien (Mike Thompson (Corey Reynolds))
- Ride Along (Detective James Payton (Ice Cube))
- Ride Along 2 (Detective James Payton (Ice Cube))
- The Running Man (VOD edition) (William Laughlin (Yaphet Kotto))
- Rush (Clay Regazzoni (Pierfrancesco Favino))
- Saw II (Xavier (Franky G))
- Scarface (2004 DVD edition) (Nick the Pig (Michael P. Moran))
- Skyline (Oliver (David Zayas))
- Small Soldiers (Brick Bazooka (George Kennedy))
- Sniper 2 (Jake Cole (Bokeem Woodbine))
- Southpaw (Jordan Mains (50 Cent))
- Spartacus series (Oenomaus (Peter Mensah))
- Sue Thomas: F.B.Eye (Special Agent Bobby Manning (Rick Peters))
- Superman (Ultraman (David Corenswet))
- S.W.A.T.: Under Siege (Scorpion (Michael Jai White))
- Table 19 (Jerry Kepp (Craig Robinson))
- The Thing (Derek Jameson (Adewale Akinnuoye-Agbaje))
- This Is the End (Seth Rogen)
- Transformers: Dark of the Moon (Hardcore Eddie (Lester Speight))
- Transformers: Revenge of the Fallen (Jetfire (Mark Ryan))
- Us (Gabriel Wilson / Abraham (Winston Duke))
- Violent Night (Santa Claus (David Harbour))
- What We Do in the Shadows (Vladislav (Jemaine Clement))
- The X-Files: I Want to Believe (Mosley Drummy (Xzibit))
- X-Men Origins: Wolverine (The Blob (Kevin Durand))
- Z for Zachariah (John Loomis (Chiwetel Ejiofor))

==== Animation ====
- The Angry Birds Movie (Bomb)
- The Angry Birds Movie 2 (Bomb)
- Bee Movie (Ken)
- Finding Nemo (Bloat)
- Finding Dory (Bloat)
- Gravity Falls (Archibald Corduroy)
- Little Robots (Sporty)
- Luca (Massimo Marcovaldo)
- Monsters vs. Aliens (The Missing Link)
- My Father's Dragon (Saiwa)
- My Gym Partner's a Monkey (Windsor Gorilla)
- Open Season 3 (Doug)
- Puss in Boots: The Last Wish (The Doctor)
- Ratchet & Clank (Captain Copernicus Qwark)
- Sausage Party (Douche)
- Shrek Forever After (Sweets)
- South Park (Tolkien Black, Diane Choksondik)
- Spider-Man: Into the Spider-Verse (Jefferson Davis)
- Superman: The Animated Series, Justice League (Lex Luthor)
- Transformers: Prime (William Fowler)
- Who Framed Roger Rabbit (Wheezy) - Special Edition

==== Video games ====
- Spider-Man 2 (Tombstone)
