= Mitsuaki Madono =

Japanese voice actor (born 1964)

- 真殿 光昭
- Born: July 28, 1964 (age 62); Osaka, Hiroshima Prefecture, Japan
- Occupation: Voice actor
- Years active: 1989–present
- Agent: Aoni Production
- Notable credit(s): GetBackers as Emishi Haruki; Valkyrie Profile as Loki; Code Geass as Kaname Ohgi; Persona 4 as Tohru Adachi; Fate/Stay Night as Issei Ryuudou; Bleach as Kon; Assassination Classroom as Kōtarō Yanagisawa; Super Robot Wars as Yuuki Jaggar
- Spouse: 1
- Children: 1
- Website: Official profile

Mitsuaki Madono (真殿 光昭, Madono Mitsuaki; born July 28, 1964) is a Japanese voice actor.

He is known for voicing characters who are jokers but sometimes hide a more insidious nature, such as Emishi Haruki in GetBackers, Loki in Valkyrie Profile, Kaname Ohgi in Code Geass, Tohru Adachi from Persona 4, Issei Ryuudou in Fate/Stay Night, Kon in Bleach, and Kōtarō Yanagisawa in Assassination Classroom.

== Biography ==
While in third grade elementary school, Madono moved from Osaka Prefecture to Hiroshima Prefecture and lived in Hiroshima until graduating from Hiroshima Prefectural Kaita High School.

He then graduated from the Voice Actor Department of the Tokyo Announce Academy, now known as the Tokyo Announce & Voice Actor Academy, and Theater Echo's affiliated training institute.

After he left Mausu Promotion, he joined Aoni Production.

His first regular role was portraying Matthew Cooper in Dr. Quinn, Medicine Woman and his first regular anime voice acting role was Aicho in Ninku.

== Filmography ==
=== Television animation ===
List of voice performances in television animation
Year	Title	Role	Notes	Source
1989	Patlabor the Mobile Police on Television	Mechanic, Itou, Yamamoto, Policeman, Guard Robot	Mechanic in Ep. 37, Itou in Ep. 38, Yamamoto in Ep. 39, Policeman in Eps. 41 and 47, Guard Robot in Ep. 42	
1989	Ranma ½	Additional voices		
1991	Moomin	Man A		
1991	Michitekuru Toki no Mukou ni	Additional voices	Television special	
1992	Salad Juu Yuushi Tomatoman	Mash		
1992	Cooking Papa	Yamagishi		
1992	Hime-chan's Ribbon	Tetsu Takada, Additional voice		
1992	Yu Yu Hakusho	Mitsunari Yanagisawa, Zeru, Kujo		
1992	Oi! Ryoma	Takuma Yamamoto		
1993	Mobile Suit Victory Gundam	Trans, Mechaman A	Mechaman A in Ep. 1	
1993	Kobo-chan	Kameyama		
1994	Chō Kuse ni Narisō	Reinhardt Ōmura		
1994	Tottemo! Luckyman	Salaryman (Dai Kenkaku), Hayao Tobita, Ring Finger Yellow, Noisy Man		
1994	Lord of Lords: Ryū Knight	Soldier		
1995	Ninku	Aicho		
1995	Azuki-chan	Ken "Ken-chan" Takayanagi		
1995	Magical Circle Guru Guru	Servant 3		
1995	Street Fighter II V	Laborer	Ep. 1	
1995	Juuni Senshi Bakuretsu Eto Ranger	Warashibe		
1995	Virtua Fighter	Koenkan A, Clerk A, Ninja B	Koenkan A in Eps. 1-2 and 4, Clerk A in Ep. 3, Ninja B in Ep. 32	
1995	Sorcerer Hunters	Marron Glacé		
1995	Touma Kishinden ONI	Hajaou		
1995	Mysterious Thief Saint Tail	Male Student A, Murakami	Male Student A in Ep. 1, Murakami in Ep. 3	
1996	Martian Successor Nadesico	Sadaaki Munetake, Ken Tenku, Ambassador, Ikeda		
1997	Flame of Recca	Joker		
1997	The King of Braves GaoGaiGar	Soldato J/Pizza		
1998	Bomberman B-Daman Bakugaiden	Kiirobon		
1999	Monster Rancher	Colorpandora	Ep. 28	
1999	One Piece	Scratchmen Apoo, Thatch		
1999	Pocket Monsters: Episode Orange Archipelago	Hide (Tad)		
2000	Argento Soma	Sheriff		
2000	Hajime no Ippo	Umezawa Masahiko		
2001	PaRappa the Rapper	Tumo-chan	Ep. 18	
2001	Project ARMS	Lt. Karl Higgins		
2001	X-TV	Sorata Arisugawa		
2002	Samurai Deeper Kyo	Chinmei		
2002	Shaman King	Peyote Diaz		
2002	Tenchi Muyo! GXP	Seiryo Tennan		
2003	GetBackers	Emishi Haruki		
2003	Uninhabited Planet Survive!	Kaoru		
2004	Fafner in the Azure	Idun		
2004	Bleach	Kon		
2004	Gantz	Hajime Muroto		
2005	Guyver: The Bioboosted Armor	Murakami Masaki		
2005	Initial D: Fourth Stage	Ichijo/Man in Evo VI		
2005	Jang Geum's Dream	Jang Soo Ro		
2006	Air Gear	Yoshitsune		
2006	Buso Renkin	Koshaku Chono (Papillon)		
2006	Code Geass: Lelouch of the Rebellion	Kaname Ohgi		
2006	Demashita! Powerpuff Girls Z	Ace		
2006	Fate/stay night	Issei Ryudo		
2006	High School Girls	Professor Odagiri		
2006	Onegai My Melody: KuruKuru Shuffle!	Jun Hiiragi		
2006	The Story of Saiunkoku	Reishin Hong		
2007	Angelique	Charlie		
2007	D.Gray-man	Cell Roron		
2007	Doraemon	Pawaemon	Eps. 193, 369, and 429	
2007	Shijō Saikyō no Deshi Kenichi	Siegfried		
2007	Pocket Monsters: Diamond and Pearl	Yūsuke (Jaco)		
2007	Shakugan no Shana II	Annaberg		
2008	Gintama	Kamotaro Itou		
2008	Stitch!	Muun		
2008	To Love-Ru	Gi Buri		
2009	Inuyasha: The Final Act	Byakuya		
2010	Digimon Xros Wars	Neptunemon		
2010	Nurarihyon no Mago	Namahage		
2010	Super Robot Wars Original Generation: The Inspector	Yuuki Jaggar		
2011	Persona 4: The Animation	Tōhru Adachi		
2011	Pocket Monsters: Best Wishes!	Takemitsu (Freddy O'Martian)		
2012	Mobile Suit Gundam AGE	Godom Tyneham		
2012	Pocket Monsters: Best Wishes! Season 2	Takemitsu (Freddy O'Martian)		
2012	Sword Art Online	Kagemune		
2013	Pocket Monsters: Best Wishes! Season 2: Decolora Adventure	Takemitsu (Freddy O'Martian)		
2014	Dragon Ball Kai	Sharpner		
2014	Gundam Build Fighters Try	Akira Suga		
2014	Persona 4: The Golden Animation	Tōhru Adachi		
2014	Fate/stay night: Unlimited Blade Works	Issei Ryūdo		
2015	Go! Princess PreCure	Close, Music Teachers		
2015	Fate/stay night [Unlimited Blade Works] 2nd Season	Issei Ryudo		
2015	Fate/kaleid liner Prisma Illya 2wei Herz!	Issei Ryūdo	Ep. 3	
2015	Shirobako	Takumi Yarase		
2016	Pretty Guardian Sailor Moon Crystal Season III	Kenji Tsukino		
2016	Assassination Classroom: Second Season	Kotaro Yanagisawa		
2016	Kagewani Sho	Reporter Kawakami, Villager (Voiced by M.S.S Project (KIKKUN-MK-II, eoheoh), Shunsuke Kanie)	Reporter Kawakami in Ep. 1, Villager (Voiced by M.S.S Project (KIKKUN-MK-II, eoheoh), Shunsuke Kanie) in Ep. 3	
2017	Pocket Monsters: Sun & Moon	Sauboh (Faba)		
2020	D4DJ First Mix	Rei's father		
2021	Shaman King	Peyote Diaz		
2026	Goodbye, Lara	Makoto Otsu		

=== Theatrical animation ===
List of voice performances in theatrical animation
Year	Title	Role	Notes	Source
1991	Ranma ½: Big Trouble in Nekonron, China	Daihakusaei		
1992	Ranma ½: Nihao, My Concubine	Daihakusaei, Prince Toma		
1995	Azuki-chan: White Valentine, The Chance for Love Has Arrived!!	Ken "Ken-chan" Takayanagi		
1996	Doraemon: Nobita and the Galaxy Super-express	Aston		
2003	Crayon Shin-chan: Fierceness That Invites Storm! Yakiniku Road of Honor	Driver		
2011	Suite Precure♪ The Movie: Take it Back! The Miraculous Melody That Connects Hearts	Flat		
2014	Saint Seiya: Legend of Sanctuary	Virgo Shaka		
2017	Fate/Stay Night: Heaven's Feel	Issei Ryūdo		
2018	Crayon Shin-chan: Burst Serving! Kung Fu Boys ~Ramen Rebellion~	Nun		
2019	Code Geass Lelouch of the Re;surrection	Kaname Ohgi		
2023	Pretty Guardian Sailor Moon Cosmos The Movie	Kenji Tsukino		

=== Original video animation (OVA) ===
List of voice performances in original video animation
Year	Title	Role	Notes	Source
1992	Tenchi Muyo!	Seiryo Tennan		
1995	Hyper Doll	Akai		
1997	Sakura Diaries	Toma Inaba		
1998	Gekigangar III	Ken Tenku		
2000	The King of Braves GaoGaiGar Final	Soldato J/Pizza		
2008	InuYasha: Black Tetsusaiga	Byakuya		

=== Original net animation (ONA) ===
List of voice performances in original net animation
Year	Title	Role	Notes	Source
2014	Pretty Guardian Sailor Moon Crystal Season I	Kenji Tsukino		
2015	Pretty Guardian Sailor Moon Crystal Season II	Kenji Tsukino		
2024	Monsters: 103 Mercies Dragon Damnation	D.R.		

=== Video games ===
- Crash Nitro Kart – Nash
- Dragon Ball Z: Burst Limit – Tenshinhan
- Eternal Sonata – Chopin
- Initial D: Street Stage – Ichijo/Man in Evo VI
- Initial D Arcade Stage 8 ∞ – Ichijo/Man in Evo VI
- JoJo's Bizarre Adventure: Heritage for the Future – Noriaki Kakyoin, Rubber Soul
- JoJo's Bizarre Adventure: All Star Battle – Josuke Higashikata [JoJolion]
- JoJo's Bizarre Adventure: Eyes of Heaven – Josuke Higashikata [JoJolion]
- Lego Island – Nick Brick
- Persona 4 – Tōru Adachi
- Persona 4 Golden – Tōhru Adachi
- Persona 4 Arena Ultimax – Tōhru Adachi
- Psychic Force – Burn Grifith
- Psychic Force 2012 – Burn Grifith
- Psychic Force Puzzle Taisen – Burn Grifith
- Super Robot Wars – Soldato J/Pizza, Yuuki Jegnan, Idoun
- Sly Cooper – Bentley
- Tales of Innocence – Hasta Extermi
- Mana Khemia: Alchemists of Al-Revis – Tony Eisler
- Mana Khemia 2: Fall of Alchemy – Tony Eisler
- Night Trap – Jeff Martin
- Super Robot Wars series – Yuuki Jaggar
- Valkyrie Profile and Valkyrie Profile: Lenneth – Loki
- The Thousand Musketeers - Ghost
- Fate/Grand Order - Chen Gong
- Fate/stay night - Issei Ryudo
- JoJo's Bizarre Adventure: All Star Battle R – Josuke Higashikata [JoJolion]

=== Tokusatsu ===
- Gekisou Sentai Carranger (1996) – EE Musubinofu (ep. 45)
- Ninpuu Sentai Hurricaneger (2002) – Revival Ninja Vamp-Iyan (ep. 25)
- GoGo Sentai Boukenger (2006) – Prometheus Stone (ep. 39)
- Juuken Sentai Gekiranger (2007) – Mythical Beast Minotaurus-Fist Shiyuu
- Engine Sentai Go-onger (2008) – Air Pollution Kitaneidas (eps. 1 - 49) (voice), Inspector Misora (ep. 50) (actor)
- Engine Sentai Go-onger: Boom Boom! Bang Bang! GekijōBang!! (2008) – Air Pollution Kitaneidas, Young Samurai of Samurai Word
- Engine Sentai Go-onger vs. Gekiranger (2009) – Air Pollution Kitaneidas
- Samurai Sentai Shinkenger vs. Go-onger: GinmakuBang!! (2010) – Air Pollution Kitaneidas
- Kaizoku Sentai Gokaiger vs. Space Sheriff Gavan: The Movie (2012) – Air Pollution Kitaneidas
- Ressha Sentai ToQger (2014) – Syringe Shadow (ep. 33)
- Shuriken Sentai Ninninger (2015) – Youkai Kasabake (ep. 16)
- Engine Sentai Go-onger 10 Years Grandprix (2018) – Air Pollution Kitaneidas
- Kaitou Sentai Lupinranger VS Keisatsu Sentai Patranger (2018) – Iselob Starfryed (ep. 38 - 39)

=== Other live-action ===
- Natsuzora (2019) – Kick Jaguar (voice)

=== Drama CDs ===
- Ao no Kiseki series 1: Ao no Kiseki – Professor Sasha
- Ao no Kiseki series 2: Catharsis Spell – Professor Sasha
- Fushigi Yūgi Genbu Kaiden – Hakei
- Ishiguro Kazuomi shi no, Sasayaka na Tanoshimi – Kazuomi Ishiguro
- Love Mode – Izumi Sakashita
- Manatsu no Higaisha 1 & 2 – Suguru Hashimoto

=== Radio drama ===
- Addicted to Curry – Makito Koenji
- Final Fantasy Tactics Advance (radio drama) – Famfrit

=== Dubbing roles ===
==== Live-action ====
- Kwon Sang-woo
  - My Tutor Friend – Kim Ji-hoon
  - Stairway to Heaven – Cha Song-joo
  - Into the Sun – Seok-min Kang
  - Once Upon a Time in High School – Hyeon-Soo
  - Sad Love Story – Seo Joon-young / Choi Joon-kyu
  - Almost Love – Ji-hwan
  - Cruel Love – Kang Yong-Ki
  - Cinderella Man – Lee Joon-hee
  - Big Thing – Ha Do-ya
  - CZ12 – Simon
  - Shall We Do It Again – Jo Hyun-woo
  - The Divine Move 2: The Wrathful – Gwi-soo
- The Adventures of Elmo in Grouchland – Big Bird
- The Art of War III: Retribution – Jason
- Band of Brothers – Donald Malarkey
- A Beautiful Mind – Bender (Anthony Rapp)
- Bill & Ted's Bogus Journey (1994 TV Tokyo edition) – Bill S. Preston (Alex Winter)
- Chicago Med – Dr. Ethan Choi (Brian Tee)
- The Counterfeiters – Burger (August Diehl)
- Cousin Skeeter – Skeeter (Bill Bellamy)
- Dr. Quinn, Medicine Woman – Matthew Cooper (Chad Allen)
- The Event – Sean Walker (Jason Ritter)
- Final Destination – Tod Waggner (Chad Donella)
- Knock Off – Tommy Hendricks (Rob Schneider)
- Meadowland – Tim (Giovanni Ribisi)
- Max Steel – Steel (Josh Brener)
- Mighty Morphin Power Rangers – Billy Cranston (eps. 1 - 48)
- October Sky – Quentin Wilson (Chris Owen)
- The Muppets - Kermit the Frog
- The Scorpion King – Arpid the Horse Thief
- Sesame Street (NHK Season 1-35 edition) – Big Bird, Ernie, Alan, Tingo (Caroll Spinney, Jim Henson, Steve Whitmire)
- She-Wolf of London – Man 1
- Star Trek: Voyager – Harry Kim
- Teletubbies – Dipsy
- Velvet Goldmine – Curt Wild (Ewan McGregor)

==== Animation ====
- Batman: The Brave and the Bold – Fun Haus
- Justice League – Kilowog
- Kung Fu Panda – Master Crane
- Kung Fu Panda 2 – Master Crane
- Kung Fu Panda 3 – Master Crane
- Megamind – Minion
- The Pirates Who Don't Do Anything: A VeggieTales Movie – Elliot (Larry the Cucumber)
- Rio – Túlio
- Secrets of the Furious Five – Crane
- Surf's Up – Mikey Abromowitz
- The Fairly OddParents – Cosmo
- TUGS – Warrior, Blair and the Coast Guard's Messenger
