= Valkyrie Profile: Covenant of the Plume =

2008 video game

- Developer: tri-Ace
- Publisher: Square Enix
- Director: Shunsuke Katsumata
- Producer: Wataru Kato
- Designers: Shutaro Yokoyama; Naoko Ando
- Programmer: Shinji Hirachi
- Artists: Ko Yoshinari; Yoh Yoshinari
- Writers: Miho Akabane; Yasushi Ohtake; Kishiko Miyagi
- Composer: Motoi Sakuraba
- Series: Valkyrie Profile
- Platform: Nintendo DS
- Release: JP: November 1, 2008; NA: March 17, 2009; EU: April 3, 2009; AU: April 9, 2009
- Genre: Tactical role-playing
- Mode: Single-player

Valkyrie Profile: Covenant of the Plume (Note: Varukirī Purofairu: Toga o Seou Mono (Japanese: ヴァルキリープロファイル 咎を背負う者; lit. Valkyrie Profile: The Accused One)) is a tactical role-playing game developed by tri-Ace and published by Square Enix for the Nintendo DS handheld game console. Released in 2008 in Japan and 2009 worldwide, the game is the third entry in the Valkyrie Profile series, acting as a prequel to the original game.

Set in a world based around Norse mythology, Covenant of the Plume follows a young man named Wylfred who wants vengeance against the Valkyrie Lenneth after taking his father in battle as an einherjar, indirectly destroying his family. Becoming a mercenary and dying himself, the goddess Hel revives Wylfred, who resumes his quest for revenge. Gameplay involves a party of recruitable characters engaging in turn-based combat on a grid. Players use an item called the Destiny Plume to strengthen their character before it inflicts permanent death, impacting the story and leading to multiple endings.

The production team found development challenging but sought to push the limits of the DS hardware while staying true to the Valkyrie Profile series. The story, inspired by a commercial for the first game, focused on how a human might view the valkyrie's mission. Character designers Ko Yoshinari and Yoh Yoshinari and composer Motoi Sakuraba returned from previous entries. Selling 230,000 copies worldwide as of May 2009, Covenant of the Plume received mixed reviews from journalists; the story and gameplay were commended, while the graphics were met with mixed reactions, and the artificial intelligence and soundtrack were criticized.

== Gameplay ==
Characters talking during a dialogue sequence (Japanese version).

Valkyrie Profile: Covenant of the Plume is a tactical role-playing game in which players take on the role of main protagonist Wylfred and a group of allies for turn-based tactical combat in three-dimensional isometric areas with a rotatable camera angle. The screens of the Nintendo DS display different information, with the top screen showing battle information and the bottom showing the story, map and battle sequences.

The story progresses through chapters, with different story routes available that offer other recruitable characters and difficulty levels. Players reach locations using a world map. The player can visit towns where merchants are based; merchants sell new equipment and items with currency earned through battles or selling items. There are also taverns, where players can learn additional lore about the world and pick up side-quests featuring battles against secondary foes. During navigation or town visits, the player can organize their units, including which will participate in combat and what abilities and weapons they can use. Each party member has a character class, which grant them unique weapon affinities and impact their attack range and movement speed. New units join Wylfred based on which path he takes through the story, with those he does not recruit turning up as enemies in later stages.

The game's turn-based battles play out in a grid-based arena. Players can field four units during combat, each assigned to one of the DS's controller buttons. Companies can move a set number of squares, either attacking or using a Skill on themselves or nearby friendly characters. Once combat is triggered with an enemy, the action shifts into a dedicated arena, with the adjoining player and allied units joining in the battle. The player launches attacks in real-time, with each character assigned to a DS's controller button. Continuous attacks raise an Attack Gauge. When an attack session raises the Gauge to or above 100, then the attacking halts for a moment, the final onslaught will trigger a cinematic "Soul Crush" finishing move. The player can continue attacks and finishing moves up to a certain point even when an enemy's health is depleted, dubbed "Overkill" by the game.

Consumable items called Skill Books impart new abilities to characters. Skill Books can be bought at merchants, received as loot from defeated enemies, or received as a reward after a battle ends. The game divides skills into two categories; Field Skills which characters can use on the battlefield to perform actions such as changing position or increasing movement range, and Battle Skills, which raise a squads defense or regenerate health. Each unit has Action Points (AP), which players use by utilizing items, performing special Skills, and casting magic. The amount of AP used increases the scale and range of characters abilities. AP regenerates after each round, with the regeneration amount varying depending on the action taken. Remaining inactive during a turn yields the most significant amount of AP.

A key mechanic tied to the narrative is the Destiny Plume, an item given to Wylfred which he can use to raise a unit's strength for a few turns within one battle. Once the battle ends or the turn limit expires, the company is subjected to permanent death, removing them from the rest of the game. Sacrificing a unit grants Wylfred a unique skill in exchange. How often or whether the player uses the Plume directly impacts the narrative. Another resource tied to battles is Sin. During each match, Wylfred must accumulate a specific amount of Sin. He gathers this either by using the Plume or performing Overkill attacks. If he does not obtain enough by the end of the battle, the next one features a powerful enemy that the party must defeat.

Upon defeating an enemy, active units receive experience points. If Wylfred falls in battle or uses the Plume too often, the player gets a "Game Over" and must restart from an earlier save. Upon completing the game once, the player can use New Game Plus, carrying over abilities and Skills learned during the previous playthrough without impacting the new game's narrative. Once players complete all story routes, a secret dungeon becomes available called the Seraphic Gate, where unique units can be defeated and recruited.

== Synopsis ==
Covenant of the Plume takes place in an unnamed world inspired by Norse mythology; the worlds include Asgard, home of the Æsir and Vanir, Midgard, the realm of humans, and Niflheim, the realm of the dead. The storyline is set before the events of Valkyrie Profile, while following off from the events of Valkyrie Profile 2: Silmeria's original timeline. In the game's backstory, a soldier called Thyodor is killed in battle and taken by the Valkyrie Lenneth as an einherjar, a soldier of the Æsir in the war against the Vanir, leaving only a feather in her wake. Thyodor's death leaves his family in poverty; his wife Margot goes insane, his daughter Elsie starves to death, and his son Wylfred swears vengeance against Lenneth. Years later, Wylfred becomes a mercenary as his land is engulfed in conflict due to the king's failing health, hoping this is the ideal opportunity to meet and kill Lenneth; he still keeps Lenneth's feather as a reminder of his mission. His friend Ancel accompanies him and tries to dissuade Wylfred from his path.

During a mission, Wylfred is attacked by monsters and mortally wounded. He is saved by Niflheim's queen Hel who grants him Lenneth's feather imbued with dark power, dubbing it the Destiny Plume. In exchange for bathing it in conflict and sin, it will award him the strength to destroy Lenneth. Using the Plume, Wylfred increases Ancel's strength to defeat the monsters, but the Plume's power kills Ancel immediately after the battle. He is taken to safety by Ailyth, a liaison between him and Hel.

The player's choices influence the story's narrative; these choices include an initial selection of alliance during a rebellion against the local government and whether Wylfred chooses to use the Plume. Following the king's death, his sons Langrey and Kristoff both claim the throne, leading to civil war. Wylfred's alliances and uses of the Plume influence the story's ending. If the player uses the Plume at any time following Ancel's death, it transforms into a weapon capable of felling Lenneth. Wylfred's actions attract Lenneth, and those sacrificed to it come to her aid in the final battle as einherjar.

- Ending C: If the player uses the Plume multiple times, Wylfred defeats Lenneth, but the Æsir Freya retrieves the valkyrie's soul. She tells Wylfred that his actions were futile as Lenneth will be reborn. Ailyth confirms he was used as a puppet by Hel for her cold war against Asgard. Freya condemns Wylfred to eternal torment in Niflheim.
- Ending B: If the player uses the Plume only once, Thyodor stops Wylfred from attacking Lenneth, who he defeats. When Wylfred renounces his path, Ailyth attacks Wylfred for breaking the covenant, and Thyodor sacrifices himself to take Wylfred's place in Niflheim. Wylfred lives to atone for his actions, forcing Lenneth to leave as retaking Thyodor would provoke a war between Asgard and Niflheim.
- Ending A: If players never use the Plume, a disappointed Ailyth arrives and reveals herself as Hel's demon hound Garm, who has been orchestrating the war for Hel's ambitions. Lenneth allows Ancel—now an einherjar—to help Wylfred defeat Garm. Before vanishing, Ancel forgives Wylfred and tells him to fix Elsie's music box before disappearing. Wylfred returns home and repairs the music box; this cures Margot's insanity, allowing Wylfred to settle into a happier life.
- If the player uses the Plume too many times, Freya appears and defeats Wylfred. Ailyth reports back to Hel, who admonishes her to be more careful in her choice of human next time. This ending is a game over scenario.

In both Ending B and C, the Æsir's leader Odin speaks with Freya about the impact of these events on Lenneth as they are causing her to sympathize with humans. To prevent her from abandoning her duty, the gods erase her human memories when they next summon her to their aid.

== Development ==
Covenant on the Plume was developed by tri-Ace, creators of the Valkyrie Profile series, and published by Square Enix. Production began in 2006, following the completion of Silmeria. The game's staff included people from both Silmeria and Valkyrie Profile: Lenneth, a PlayStation Portable (PSP) port of the original game. At the time, the game was tri-Ace's first for portable consoles. According to lead programmer Shinji Hirachi, the game's production was "hard work from beginning to end" and a very emotional experience for him. The team's main challenge was creating a new gameplay experience while staying true to the aesthetics and style of the Valkyrie Profile series. Shunsuke Katsumata, the game's director at tri-Ace, felt a lot of pressure to create a high-quality product due to the fan base's high expectations from the series. While the gameplay moved away from the traditional RPG gameplay of the previous games, the team felt the current system inherited the tactical elements from Silmeria.

The lead developer Takeshi Sakame designed the game's engine to push the limits of the DS hardware with its map rendering and particle effects. The tri-Ace team had difficulty meeting their goal of maintaining a frame rate of 60 frames per second. After the team added the voice files, the game's frame rate fell to 30 frames per second, forcing Sakame to make some adjustments to the engine. Despite the alterations in hardware and battle perspective, Katsumata felt they had accurately captured the feeling of battle from earlier Valkyrie Profile titles. Each stage was individually designed to work from the tilted camera perspective, each having a unique environmental theme present from the concept stages onward. Due to the protagonist being human, the game was on a smaller scale than earlier entries as he could not fly around a world map.

Miho Akabane created the story concept. Yasushi Ohtake and Kishiko Miyagi of the writing company EdgeWorks wrote the script. In contrast to earlier entries which showed events from the perspective of the Valkyries and other divine powers, Covenant of the Plume focused on a human lead, creating a more relatable view of the world for players. The central theme of the story is "Vengeance on the Gods". While Silmeria focused on the titular sister of Lenneth and her human host Alice and the first Valkyrie Profile viewed the einherjar from a distant perspective, Covenant of the Plume concentrated on the feelings and plight of the einherjar. The scenario's concept came to Akabane from watching a commercial for the original Valkyrie Profile, which showed Lenneth retrieving a man's soul as his aged mother grieved over the body. Akabane wondered whether the woman might view Lenneth as a goddess of death rather than salvation. While producer Yoshinori Yamagishi suggested cameo appearances from Valkyrie Profile and Silmeria characters, Yamagishi discarded this idea due to the focus on human stories. Series veterans Ko Yoshinari and Yoh Yoshinari designed the game's characters. Toshimitsu Hanafusa, who had previously worked on the graphics of Silmeria, designed the in-game character sprites. Keeping the spectacular style of the series in mind, Hanafusa wanted to portray the characters very humanly. Studio Anima produced the 3D CGI cutscenes.

=== Music ===
The music was composed by Motoi Sakuraba, who had previously worked on both Valkyrie Profile and its sequel. The in-game score was written as MIDI tracks, allowing it to fit easily onto the DS cartridge. Drawing from the darker themes of the narrative, Sakuraba created a subdued and emotional score that noticeably moved away from his score for Silmeria while still being separate from his work on Valkyrie Profile. The score included original composition and arranged versions of tracks from Sakuraba's scores for Valkyrie Profile. Sound design studio Noisycroak did the soundtrack conversion for the DS cartridge.

A two-disc soundtrack album was published on November 5, 2008, by Square Enix's music label. For the album release, Sakuraba used the MIDI originals as a reference and redid all the tracks with fuller orchestration. While faithful to the original, the more extensive range of sounds resulted in some differences. A twelve-track arrange album, handled by Sakuraba, was published alongside the main soundtrack album.

=== Release ===
Square Enix announced Covenant of the Plume in March 2008 in an issue of V Jump. At the time of its announcement, the game was undergoing balancing and bug fixes. tri-Ace officially translated the game's Japanese subtitle to be "The Accused One". Following its announcement, various tri-Ace staff posted on a dedicated official blog about the game, a first for the company. Initially scheduled for release in October of that year, Square Enix delayed the launch to do further quality assurance work. Square Enix eventually pushed the game back to November 1. Several characters, including Wylfred and Ailyth, were later included as downloadable player characters in Valkyrie Anatomia: The Origin.

A Western release was confirmed by Square Enix in November 2008, with a trademark for its English subtitle spotted in June of that year. New Generation Pictures recorded the English voice acting and had previously worked on Valkyrie Profile: Lenneth and Silmera. The game was released in North America on March 17, 2009, in Europe on April 3, and in Australia on April 9.

== Reception ==
Reception

Aggregate score
| Aggregator | Score |
|---|---|
| Metacritic | 74 of 100 |

Review scores
| Publication | Score |
|---|---|
| 1Up.com | B |
| Eurogamer | 6/10 |
| Famitsu | 32/40 |
| Game Informer | 6/10 |
| GameSpot | 6/10 |
| IGN | 8.5/10 |
| Nintendo World Report | 9/10 |
| RPGFan | 83% |

The game debuted on the Japanese sales charts at number two, selling 80,000 copies. This amount was around the same sales level as Valkyrie Profile: Lenneth for the PSP and described by another site as "quite impressive". It was the 97th best-selling game in Japan in 2008, selling 136,948 copies with a sell-through rate of under 50%. As of May 2009, the game sold 230,000 copies worldwide; most sales were in Japan with 160,000 units, while North America and Europe saw 50,000 and 20,000. The games sale numbers made the title one of Square Enix's better-selling titles of the 2008-2009 period.

Valkyrie Profile: Covenant of the Plume received "mixed or average" reviews according to Metacritic. Reviewers highly praised the game's story; Daemon Hatfield of IGN termed it a "very mature, serious adventure" and praised the "very well written" script. Shiva Stella of GameSpot called it "fascinating" and very engaging, and Hyper's Daniel Wilks commended the game for being "very dark in tone". Reviewers also praised the gameplay; Kat Bailey of 1UP.com said that it goes "a long way toward restoring the fundamental character of the series". Hatfield added that "it's the battle system that really distinguishes Covenant of the Plume", and both reviews noted the Plume mechanic as novel and interesting. James Clark of RPGFan called it the game's "most dramatic and interesting gameplay feature". All three reviews also, however, called out the game's AI as lackluster. Bailey also criticized the map design as "a recurring problem".

The game's graphics received a mixed reception: Stella of GameSpot praised the graphics, including the character sprites and animations, but RPGFan's Clark termed it merely a "decent-looking game", while Bailey of 1UP.com criticized the "pixelated sprites, [and] the ugly polygonal landscape". Clark, Stella, and Hatfield criticized the music for mainly reusing music from Valkyrie Profile: Lenneth, but with worse sound quality.
