= New Generation Pictures =

American production company

Coordinates: 34°3′28.2″N 118°23′51″W

New Generation Pictures, Inc.
- Company type: Private
- Industry: ADR Production, Commercial production and service, Post Production, Localization, Video Game Recording
- Founded: 1992
- Founder: Jonathan Klein; Reiko Matsuo
- Headquarters: Beverly Hills, California
- Website: http://www.newgenerationpictures.com

New Generation Pictures, Inc. is a production company specializing in voice recording for anime and video games.

== Production list ==
=== Anime ===
==== ADR Production ====
- 3×3 Eyes (Geneon)
- Amazing Nurse Nanako (Geneon)
- Angel Tales (Bandai Entertainment)
- Dangaizer 3 (Right Stuf)
- Bayonetta: Bloody Fate (Funimation)
- Daphne in the Brilliant Blue (Geneon)
- DearS (Geneon)
- Diary of Our Days at the Breakwater (Funimation)
- Ergo Proxy (Geneon)
- Eureka Seven: Hi-Evolution (Funimation)
- Anemone: Eureka Seven Hi-Evolution (Funimation)
- Ghost Talker's Daydream (Geneon)
- Girls Bravo (Geneon)
- Gun Sword (Geneon)
- Haibane Renmei (Geneon)
- Hellsing (TV Series: Geneon, Ultimate: Geneon [Eps. 1-4], Funimation [Eps. 5-10])
- I's (Viz Media)
- Ikki Tousen (Season 1: Geneon, Seasons 3-4: Funimation)
- Kamichu! (Geneon)
- King's Raid: Successors of the Will (Funimation)
- Koi Kaze (Geneon)
- Licensed by Royalty (Geneon)
- The Melody of Oblivion (Geneon)
- Mermaid Forest (Geneon)
- Muhyo & Roji's Bureau of Supernatural Investigation (Funimation)
- Nazca (Geneon)
- NieA 7 (Geneon)
- Paranoia Agent (Geneon)
- R.O.D. The TV (Geneon)
- Rumic Theater (Geneon)
- Spirit of Wonder Scientific Boys Club (Bandai Entertainment)
- Starship Girl Yamamoto Yohko (Right Stuf)
- Strawberry Eggs (Geneon)
- Street Fighter IV: The Ties that Bind (Capcom)
- Super Milk Chan (Pilot; Geneon)
- Texhnolyze (Geneon)

==== Translation and subtitling ====
- Agent Aika (Central Park Media)
- Beautiful Beast (Central Park Media)
- Bio Hunter (Urban Vision)
- The Cockpit (Urban Vision)
- DNA Sights 999.9 (Urban Vision)
- Fencer of Minerva (Central Park Media)
- Four Play (Central Park Media)
- Future GPX Cyber Formula (Bandai Entertainment)
- Gatchaman (Urban Vision)
- Geobreeders (Central Park Media)
- Goku: Midnight Eye (Urban Vision)
- Golgo 13 series (Urban Vision)
- The Hakkenden (Geneon)
- Hurricane Polymar (Urban Vision)
- I Dream of Mimi (Right Stuf)
- Judge (Central Park Media)
- Kishin Corps (Geneon)
- Labyrinth of Flames (Central Park Media)
- Maetel Legend (Central Park Media)
- Magical Girl Pretty Sammy (Geneon)
- Maze (Central Park Media)
- Mystery of the Necronomicon (Central Park Media)
- Ninja Scroll (TV Series) (Urban Vision)
- Pet Shop of Horrors (Urban Vision)
- Sailor Victory (Media Blasters)
- Saint Tail (Tokyopop)
- Scorpion's Revenge (Central Park Media)
- Sherlock Hound (Geneon)
- Spaceship Agga Ruter (Central Park Media)
- StrayDog: Kerberos Panzer Cops (Bandai Entertainment)
- Sumo Vixens (Central Park Media)
- Talking Head (Bandai Entertainment)
- Tekkaman Blade (Urban Vision)
- Tenchi Muyo! Ryo-Ohki (Geneon)
- Terminatrix (Central Park Media)
- The Red Spectacles (Bandai)
- Tokyo Mafia series (Central Park Media)
- Twilight of the Dark Master (Urban Vision)
- Vampire Hunter D (Urban Vision)
- Vampire Princess Miyu (Tokyopop)
- Weather Woman (Central Park Media)
- Wicked City (Urban Vision)
- Wild 7 (Urban Vision)
- Wrath of the Ninja (Central Park Media)

=== Video games ===
- Aliens vs. Pinball (Zen Studios)
- CastleStorm (Zen Studios)
- Circus Electrique (Zen Studios)
- Conception Plus (Spike Chunsoft)
- Dead Rising Deluxe Remaster (Capcom)
- Dark Rose Valkyrie (Idea Factory)
- Dawn of Mana (Square Enix)
- Demon Gaze (NIS America)
- Demon Gaze 2 (NIS America)
- Dragon Star Varnir (Idea Factory)
- Final Fantasy Crystal Chronicles: The Crystal Bearers (Square Enix)
- Final Fantasy Fables: Chocobo's Dungeon (Square Enix)
- Final Fantasy IV (Nintendo DS) (Square Enix)
- God Wars: Future Past (NIS America)
- The Guided Fate Paradox (NIS America)
- Hunter's Arena: Legends (Mantisco)
- Infinite Undiscovery (Square Enix)
- Jurassic Park Interactive (Vivendi Universal Games)
- KickBeat (Zen Studios)
- The Last Remnant (Square Enix)
- The Lost Child (NIS America)
- Lufia: Curse of the Sinistrals (Natsume)
- Marvel Dimension of Heroes (Lenovo)
- Marvel Heroes (Gazillion Entertainment)
- Marvel vs. Capcom 3: Fate of Two Worlds (Capcom)
- Ultimate Marvel vs. Capcom 3 (Capcom)
- Marvel vs. Capcom: Infinite (Capcom)
- Marvel Pinball (Zen Studios)
- Mega Man 11 (Capcom)
- MeiQ: Labyrinth of Death (Idea Factory)
- Monster Hunter Wilds (Capcom)
- Natural Doctrine (NIS America)
- Operation Abyss: New Tokyo Legacy (NIS America)
- Penny Punching Princess (NIS America)
- Rising Thunder (Video Game) (Radiant Entertainment)
- Rodea the Sky Soldier (NIS America)
- Romancing SaGa (Square Enix)
- Rune Factory 3 (Natsume)
- Rune Factory: Tides of Destiny (Natsume)
- Star Ocean: The Last Hope (Square Enix)
- Street Fighter IV (Capcom)
- Super Street Fighter IV (Capcom)
- Street Fighter V (Capcom)
- Street Fighter V: Arcade Edition (Capcom)
- Street Fighter V: Championship Edition (Capcom)
- Street Fighter 6 (Capcom)
- Street Fighter X Tekken (Capcom)
- Teppen (GungHo Online Entertainment)
- Time Crisis 4 (Bandai Namco Games)
- Tomb Raider Pinball (Zen Studios)
- Trillion: God of Destruction (Idea Factory)
- Universal Classics Pinball (Zen Studios)
- Valkyrie Profile: Covenant of the Plume (Square Enix)
- Valkyrie Profile: Lenneth (Square Enix)
- Valkyrie Profile 2: Silmeria (Square Enix)
- Witch's Wish (Natsume)
- Zen Pinball (Zen Studios)
