= Valkyrie Anatomia =

2016 video game

Valkyrie Anatomia: The Origin
- Developer: Dokidoki Groove Works
- Publisher: Square Enix
- Writer: Bun-O Fujisawa
- Composer: Motoi Sakuraba
- Series: Valkyrie Profile
- Platforms: Android, iOS
- Release: JP: April 28, 2016; WW: April 4, 2019
- Genre: Role-playing game
- Mode: Single-player

Valkyrie Anatomia: The Origin was a role-playing video game developed by Dokidoki Groove Works and published by Square Enix for Android and iOS. The game is set in an alternate world from Valkyrie Profile and was released in Japan in April 2016 and worldwide in April 2019. The worldwide server of the game was shut down in August 2020 and the Japanese one in April 2021.

== Gameplay ==
The game was split up into missions, with story cutscenes between. The players could control the protagonist valkyrie, along with a party of up to three recruited Einherjar. During missions, the player was presented with a map of points which cost AP, or stamina, to move between; AP replenished over time or could be purchased through in-app purchases. AP was also used to heal after battles, or freeze enemies during a battle. At each point on a map, the players entered a 3D area; there, the players could fight monsters and collect treasure chests. Combat had the player tapping their party's character portraits when their action bar was full, and swiping up with the correct timing to use their special abilities. A combo gauge was slowly filled to allow special attacks. Characters used weapons which were collected from chests and defeated enemies; weapons could be combined and upgraded, and in-game currency was used to increase the chance of better equipment being generated. In-game currency was also purchasable through in-app purchases.

== Plot ==
The setting is inspired by Norse mythology; the setting is divided up into nine worlds, including Midgard and Asgard. The story takes place before the plot of the original Valkyrie Profile. The protagonist is Lenneth Valkyrie, who is preparing for Ragnarok. Lord of the gods Odin commands Lenneth to choose human souls to be Einherjar, and so before they die, heroes are made to fight in the final war between the gods. Lenneth is unsure if the world should end, and as she grows fond of them, she may help stop the final battle.

== Development ==
The game was unveiled by Square Enix in April 2016. The games graphics were developed by Square Enix's CGI making subsidiary Visual Works. The game's development staff included producer Yoshinori Yamagishi, composer Motoi Sakuraba, and scenario writer Bun-O Fujisawa. The game was released on April 28 of the same year for iOS and Android devices.

After ten years since a new Valkyrie Profile title was released, and having been asked many times by fans when a new entry would be released, Valkyrie Anatomia: The Origin began its development. Square Enix was also looking to use one of their intellectual properties to create a social game, and someone proposed using the Valkyrie Profile series but trying to retain its charm. Producer Yoshinori Yamagishi mentioned his favorite way of drawing out emotion in players was through music and sound effects, helping to both immerse new players in the world of the game and play upon the nostalgia of series fans. The game utilizes a mixture of music from the franchise and new compositions. After fans requested more focus on the Einherjar like the original Valkyrie Profile, and Yamagishi did not want to create something after the most recent console games as it might interfere with game development plans, he decided to create a story that centers on an Einherjar from the beginning of the series story. Yamagishi stated that development was a much shorter length of time than the usual Valkyrie title. He also intended there to be cliff hangers in the plot, and lingering mysteries like a typical RPG to keep players interested. Post-release, Yamagishi said that they listen for how players feel and make adjustments accordingly to keep the game interesting for long term investment.

The worldwide server of the game was shut down on August 31, 2020. The Japanese server of the game was shut down on April 27, 2021.

== Reception ==
RPGFan summed up their review as "wasted opportunity, collect-a-thon, and genuinely bad freemium ideas rolled into one package". The publication also condemned the title for many reasons, including selling basic game features for a premium such as the ability to change the speed of combat. Siliconera noted the game's generosity compared to other freemium games based on established franchises, in that most games make the purchase for powerful or popular characters, and The Origin starts players with two powerful characters, Sennah and Jeanne.

Within two weeks of release, the game exceeded one million downloads.
