= Valkyrie Elysium =

- Developer: Soleil
- Publisher: Square Enix
- Composer: Motoi Sakuraba
- Series: Valkyrie Profile
- Engine: Unreal Engine 4
- Platforms: PlayStation 4; PlayStation 5; Windows
- Release: PlayStation 4, PlayStation 5 September 29, 2022; Windows; November 11, 2022
- Genre: Action role-playing game
- Mode: Single-player

Valkyrie Elysium is an action role-playing video game developed by Soleil and published by Square Enix. It was released on September 29, 2022 for PlayStation 4 and PlayStation 5, and on November 11 for Windows. Part of the Valkyrie Profile series, it was the first home console installment in more than 15 years, and the third overall. Like its predecessors, the game is significantly based on Norse mythology, and follows Maria, a valkyrie who is created to find and purify souls to help an injured Odin defeat Fenrir, during Ragnarok. Elysium, a spiritual sequel, uses an action, rather than turn-based, battle system. The game received mixed reviews from critics, who praised the game's character design, artwork, combat system, voice acting, and music, but the narrative was criticized as weak, and the graphical quality was seen as low-budget, with environments lacking in detail or things to interact with.

== Plot ==
The game follows Maria, a valkyrie and lesser god created by Odin, the "All-Father". She is sent to find and purify souls on Midgard so as to bolster support for Odin, using the Einherjar, resurrected warriors who further Odin's cause. Each Einherjar has their own story of what led to their demise. Maria can also access the memories of deceased humans by interacting with flowers known as Hollow Blossoms. Maria also learns about the Verdan Blossoms, which holds memories she can't decipher.

During one of her missions to purify souls, Maria meets Armand, a human searching for an unknown objective. She also encounters a rogue valkyrie named Hilde. After a brief confrontation, Hilde warns Maria not to trust Odin. Maria later reports the encounter to Odin, who claims that certain forces are attempting to undermine his efforts to save the world. He then instructs her to locate the Four Gifts, stating that they are necessary to achieve this goal.

Maria retrieves two of the Gifts but suffers a setback after encountering Hilde again, who is already in possession of the remaining Gifts. After defeating Hilde in another battle, her benefactor Fenrir appears and reveals to Maria and the Einherjar that Odin is not attempting to save the world, but instead plans to use the souls to increase his power. Fenrir then summons a large number of undead before departing. Maria and the Einherjar are subsequently rescued by Odin.

Having already lost the remaining Gifts, Odin orders Maria to kill Fenrir and retrieve them. Maria then encounters Fenrir in Nifleheim in which the latter reveals the truth; once Odin gathers enough souls, he plans to escape to a new world to avoid his own destruction in the impending Ragnarok. After surviving an ambush set by Fenrir, a conflicted Maria questions Odin’s motives back in Asgard, but he dismisses Fenrir’s claims as falsehoods intended to turn her against him. Maria returns to Nifleheim to confront Fenrir once again.

The game has multiple endings which depends on the players actions upond reaching Chapter 9:

- Twilight of the Wolf. If the player fails to collect all Verdan Blossoms and does not speak to Armand, Maria confronts and kills Fenrir. The world is subsequently destroyed along with the Einherjar, while Odin escapes and brings Maria to a new world.
- A Momentary Escape. If the player fails to collect all Verdan Blossoms but speaks to Armand, Maria learns that in her previous life she was a woman named Nora and Armand’s wife. She then chooses to flee with Armand, forsaking her duties as a valkyrie.
- Twlight of the All-Father. If the player fails to collect all Verdan Blossoms, speaks to Armand, but refuses to accompany him, Maria battles and kills both Fenrir and Odin. She and the Einherjar return to Midgard to protect the remaining humans as they await the end of the world.
- Unbound Possibilities. The game’s true ending is unlocked if Maria collects all Verdan Blossoms and speaks with Armand, but refuses to accompany him. She learns that when a soul dies, it returns to the world tree, Yggdrasil, which serves as the source of its power to continue existence itself. The gods, however, have been harvesting souls to increase their own strength. Maria, alongside Hilde, defeats and kills both Fenrir and Odin, restoring the souls to Yggdrasil, including the Einherjar. Hilde remains behind to continue her mission of gathering souls for Yggdrasil, while Maria returns to Midgard and reunites with Armand.

== Reception ==
Reception

Aggregate score
Aggregator	Score
Metacritic	PS5: 65/100

Review scores
Publication	Score
GameSpot	5/10
IGN	6/10
RPGamer	3.5/5

The game received an aggregate score of 65/100 on Metacritic on PlayStation 5, indicating "mixed or average reviews".

Paul Shkreli of RPGamer rated the game's PS5 version 3.5/5 points, noting that its existence felt like a "miracle in itself" due to the series' long dormancy. He opined that while the game's combat system did not line up with what fans expected for a continuation of the series, the gameplay and music were good when judged on their own merits. Shkreli called the character designs and art "gorgeous", and the transition to action combat "gracefully handled", saying that it felt like an "organic and natural" successor. However, he called the world "mostly empty" save for enemies, remarking that it did not feel like a world in need of saving, and noted that the graphical quality varied greatly. He also described the world-building as "paper thin", with a "sparse" story that was "brief and predictable".

Chris Shive of Hardcore Gamer also rated the PS5 version 3.5/5 points, calling the excitement about a return to the franchise "short-lived" when it was shown to be action-based. He said that, despite the "bare bones" story, the battle system "delivers", calling it enjoyable throughout the game despite being "rough around the edges". Saying that it had the potential to be a great game, he nevertheless called the execution too uneven and "minimal", and the storytelling and level design "uninspired". Josh Torres of RPG Site rated the game 7/10 points, praising the battle system, but calling every other aspect of the game "mediocre". He described the story as "barebones and predictable", saying that the living NPCs of previous games were much more "poignant" than Elysium's Hollow Blossoms, voices of people who were already dead. He also criticized the presentation of the Einherjar memories, saying they compared unfavorably with the Thousand Years of Dreams from Lost Odyssey. He ultimately expressed his hope that the series would not be "overtaken" by the gameplay style going forward, and that it would continue to be a spin-off.
