= List of Gurren Lagann episodes =

Gurren Lagann
- Front cover of the "Ultimate Edition" release of Gurren Lagann by UK distributor Anime Limited.
- No. of episodes: 27

Release
- Original network: TXN (TV Tokyo), BS Japan, AT-X
- Original release: April 1 – September 30, 2007

This is a list of episodes of Gurren Lagann, a Japanese anime series produced by Gainax and directed by Hiroyuki Imaishi. The anime premiered on the TV Tokyo and other TXN stations on April 1, 2007, containing twenty-seven episodes. The English version began to air on Sci-Fi's Ani-Monday block, airing two episodes a week, starting July 28, 2008. The English version also began airing on Animax across its English-language networks in Southeast Asia and South Asia, starting on May 22, 2009. In Canada, it airs on Super Channel.

Each episode's title is derived from a line spoken by a specific character from the series: the titles from episodes 1 through 8 are spoken by Kamina, episodes 9 through 15 by Nia, the preview for episode 16 by Viral, episodes 17 through 22 by Rossiu, and episodes 23 through 27 by Simon. Note that not all translations for the episode titles are official.

== Episodes ==
No.	Title	Directed by	Written by	Original air date	English air date
1	"Bust Through the Heavens with Your Drill!"; Transliteration: "Omae no doriru de ten o tsuke!" (Japanese: お前のドリルで天を突け!)	Masahiko Otsuka	Kazuki Nakashima	April 1, 2007	July 28, 2008
In Giha village, an underground town, Simon and Kamina live mundane lives with the constant threat of earthquakes. During an attempt to escape to the surface - something almost unheard of - Kamina and Simon bear witness to a gigantic wolf-faced Gunman, as it crashes through the ceiling into the middle of their subterranean home. Together with the Gunman's pursuer, a girl from the neighboring village, Yoko, the two young men find the key - a small Gunman buried deep in the ground, named Lagann by Kamina - to both defeating the massive intruder and leaving Giha Village.
2	"I Said I'm Gonna Pilot That Thing!!"; Transliteration: "Ore ga noru tte itten da!!" (Japanese: 俺が乗るって言ってんだ!!)	Shouji Saeki	Kazuki Nakashima	April 8, 2007	July 28, 2008
With Lagann in hand, Kamina and Simon take Yoko back to her home village of Littner. Life on the surface world catches up to Kamina and Simon, as they find themselves assisting in defending against a new Gunman threat and the Beastmen who pilot them. After forcibly ejecting one of the Beastmen from his Gunman, Kamina seizes control of his own Gunman, which he names Gurren.
3	"Who Do You Think You Are, Having Two Faces!?"; Transliteration: "Kao ga futatsu tā namaiki na!!" (Japanese: 顔が2つたぁナマイキな!!)	Son Seung-heui	Kazuki Nakashima	April 15, 2007	August 4, 2008
In the aftermath of the previous battle, Kamina, Simon, and Yoko proceed to forage for provisions. However, a chance encounter with a formidable Beastman, Viral, and his powerful Gunman forces the Gurren and the Lagann to combine to form a new Gunman - Gurren Lagann.
4	"Having Multiple Faces Makes You Great?"; Transliteration: "Kao ga ōkerya Erai no ka?" (Japanese: 顔が多けりゃ偉いのか?)	Osamu Kobayashi	Hiroshi Yamaguchi	April 22, 2007	August 4, 2008
In order to take the fight to the Beastmen and their Gunmen, Team Gurren sets out from Littner Village to strike a possible Gunmen rallying point. Along the way, they encounter the eccentric Black Siblings, as well as the prospects of having to defeat a multi-faceted enemy on empty stomachs. Directed by guest Osamu Kobayashi.
5	"I Don't Get It, Not One Bit!"; Transliteration: "Ore ni wa sappari wakaranē!" (Japanese: 俺にはさっぱりわからねぇ!)	Hiroaki Tomita	Shouji Saeki	April 29, 2007	August 11, 2008
Team Gurren's continuing journey brings them to an underground village, where society mandates a humbling existence and the worship of Gunmen as divine beings. After leaving the village, Team Gurren is joined by Rossiu, the adopted son of the village chief, and two children, Gimmy and Darry.
5.5	"My Gurren is Sparkling!!"; Transliteration: "Ore no Guren wa pikkapika!!" (Japanese: 俺のグレンはピッカピカ!!)	Hiroshi Kurimoto	Kazuki Nakashima	October 25, 2007	N/A
Envious of seeing how Simon keeps Lagann clean and neat, Kamina asks the mysterious Chitori to clean up Gurren for him, unaware of her true intentions. Note: This is a bonus episode bundled with the Nintendo DS game based on the series.
6	"Sit in the Hot Tub 'Til You're Sick!!"; Transliteration: "Temēra zen'in yuatari shiyagare!!" (Japanese: てめえら全員湯あたりしやがれ!!)	Shin Itagaki	Masahiko Ōtsuka; Kazuki Nakashima	May 6, 2007	August 11, 2008
On their way to the Gunmen rallying point, Team Gurren decides to take a break at a hot springs getaway they find in the middle of nowhere, only to discover not everything is as it seems. Note: This episode features several clip show sequences in place of scenes considered inappropriate for television, such as a subplot involving Kamina attempting to see the girls nude. An uncut version of the episode, "There are Some Things I Just Have to See!!" (見てえものは見てえんだ!!, Mitē Mono wa Mitēn da!!), was included in home video releases.
7	"You're Gonna Do It!!"; Transliteration: "Sore wa omae ga yarun da yo!" (Japanese: それはお前がやるんだよ!)	Katsuichi Nakayama	Kazuki Nakashima	May 13, 2007	August 18, 2008
More details of the Beastman Empire are revealed as Thymilph, one of the Four Divine Generals of the Spiral King, arrives to support Viral's Enki, with the massive mobile Gunmen fortress, the Dai-Ganzan. Seizing the opportunity to land a great victory, Kamina and Simon pilot the Gurren-Lagann against seemingly overwhelming odds.
8	"Later, Buddy"; Transliteration: "Abayo, dachikō" (Japanese: あばよ、ダチ公)	Masahiko Ōtsuka	Kazuki Nakashima	May 20, 2007	August 18, 2008
Having temporarily stalled Viral and Thymilph in the last skirmish, the Team Gurren and their newly arrived allies join forces as "Team Dai-Gurren" and launch a decisive strike against the regrouping Gunmen force. The massive battle violently reaches its conclusion, but Kamina dies in the process.
9	"What, Exactly, Is a Human?"; Transliteration: "Hito tte ittai nan desu ka?" (Japanese: ヒトっていったい何ですか?)	Tarō Iwasaki	Kazuki Nakashima	May 27, 2007	September 8, 2008
Team Dai-Gurren managed to take control of the enemy fortress, but everyone is still mourning Kamina's death, especially Simon. After falling off a cliff, he notices a Gunman throw a capsule into a deep valley. Simon inspects it and finds he is able to open it with the same drill key he uses to pilot Lagann, and inside is a young human girl named Nia, but their introduction is cut short when a horse-faced Gunman appears.
10	"Who Is This Bro?"; Transliteration: "Aniki tte ittai dare desu ka?" (Japanese: アニキっていったい誰ですか?)	Hiroshi Kurimoto	Shouji Saeki	June 3, 2007	September 8, 2008
Having been temporarily spared by Adiane, another of the Four Divine Generals, Team Dai-Gurren uses the reprieve to reassess their situation. Nia learns of Kamina's significance in Simon's erratic behavior and offers him some stinging, yet honest advice, which draws the ire of an untrusting Yoko. With tension building within the Team, the crew scrambles to stand by Nia's side when Adiane returns to complete her stalled attack.
11	"Simon, Hands Off"; Transliteration: "Shimon, te o dokete" (Japanese: シモン、手をどけて)	Takayoshi Morimiya	Shouji Saeki	June 10, 2007	September 15, 2008
Team Dai-Gurren falls into a trap set by the third member of the Four Divine Generals, Guame. The Team is taken captive and stored underground to await execution. While digging an escape path, Simon finally understands Kamina's last words to him and after having a discussion with Guame, Nia finds out the reason why she was thrown away.
12	"Yoko, Will You Do Me a Favor?"; Transliteration: "Yōko-san, onegai ga arimasu" (Japanese: ヨーコさん、お願いがあります)	Hiroshi Kurimoto	Kurasumi Sunayama	June 17, 2007	September 15, 2008
On their way to Teppelin, the Beastmen's capital city, Team Dai-Gurren stumbles upon a vast ocean and must wait for modifications on the Dai-Gurren to be completed before crossing it. While the rest of the group play at the beach, Yoko starts to feel uneasy about Nia and all the attention she gets from them. After preparations are complete, Team Dai-Gurren begins their sea cruise, oblivious to the fact that an ambush is underway by Adiane and Viral.
13	"Eat Up, Everyone!"; Transliteration: "Mina-san, ta~n to meshiagare" (Japanese: みなさん、た〜んと召し上がれ)	Akitoshi Yokoyama	Kurasumi Sunayama	June 24, 2007	September 22, 2008
Trying to do her part in Team Dai-Gurren, Nia decides to become a cook, but just before the crew have a taste of her dishes, Cytomander, the fourth member of the Divine Generals, launches an aerial attack on the Dai-Gurren. Simon leads the counter-attack on the Gurren-Lagann, this time accompanied by Yoko, who replaces a sick Rossiu.
14	"Well Met, Everyone"; Transliteration: "Mina-san, gokigen'yō" (Japanese: 皆さん、ごきげんよう)	Katsuichi Nakayama	Hiroshi Yamaguchi	July 1, 2007	September 22, 2008
At last, Team Dai-Gurren arrives at the outskirts of Teppelin, but before aiming to the city, they must face a combined full-scale attack of Cytomander and Guame's forces.
15	"I Will Head Towards Tomorrow"; Transliteration: "Watashi wa ashita e mukaimasu" (Japanese: 私は明日へ向います)	Ayumu Kotake; Masahiko Ōtsuka	Kurasumi Sunayama	July 8, 2007	September 29, 2008
The last of the Divine Generals falls and the city of Teppelin collapses, revealing a Gunman of gigantic proportions. Simon and Nia struggle to pass through it in order to confront her father, the Spiral King himself.
16	"Compilation Episode"; Transliteration: "Sōshūhen" (Japanese: 総集片)	Hiroyuki Yamaga	N/A	July 15, 2007	September 29, 2008
A clip show recapping the events of the previous episodes.
17	"You Don't Know Anything!"; Transliteration: "Anata wa nani mo wakatteinai" (Japanese: あなたは何も分かっていない)	Masahiko Ōtsuka	Kazuki Nakashima	July 22, 2007	October 6, 2008
During the following seven years, a new civilization rises and prospers under Simon's leadership. However, these peaceful times come to end when the threat mentioned in Lordgenome's last words starts to reveal itself.
18	"Tell Me the Secrets of This World"; Transliteration: "Kikasete morau zo kono sekai no nazo o" (Japanese: 聞かせてもらうぞこの世界の謎を)	Toshiya Shinohara	Kazuki Nakashima	July 29, 2007	October 6, 2008
After the Anti-Spirals' first attack and Nia's astonishing announcement, Simon looks desperately for her, while Rossiu finally completes his secret project.
19	"We Will Survive by Any Means Necessary"; Transliteration: "Ikinokorun da donna shudan o tsukatte mo" (Japanese: 生き残るんだどんな手段を使っても)	Yorifusa Yamaguchi	Kazuki Nakashima	August 5, 2007	October 13, 2008
To soothe the public opinion, Rossiu overthrows Simon and puts him under arrest. But when the Anti-Spirals launch a large-scale attack on Kamina City, he is left with no option but to let Simon engage the enemy using the Gurren-Lagann, not before resorting to extremes to put him under his control.
20	"How Far Will God Test Us?"; Transliteration: "Kami wa doko made bokura o tamesu" (Japanese: 神はどこまで僕らを試す)	Yasuhiro Geshi	Kazuki Nakashima	August 12, 2007	October 13, 2008
As Simon arrives in prison, he unexpectedly meets Viral, who comments on how far he has fallen. Meanwhile, the truth about Rossiu's emergency plan and the consequences for those left behind on Earth are revealed.
21	"You Are Someone Who Ought to Survive"; Transliteration: "Anata wa ikinokoru beki hito da" (Japanese: あなたは生き残るべき人だ)	Shouji Saeki	Kazuki Nakashima	August 19, 2007	October 27, 2008
One year earlier, Yoko starts working as a schoolteacher on an island until she learns of the situation at Teppelin and returns to break Simon free. Once again reunited, Simon and the members of Team Dai-Gurren launch themselves into space to protect the Arc-Gurren from the enemy forces, now accompanied by Viral as co-pilot of the Gurren-Lagann.
22	"That is My Last Duty"; Transliteration: "Sore ga boku no saigo no gimu da" (Japanese: それが僕の最後の義務だ)	Ikehata Hiroshi	Kazuki Nakashima	August 26, 2007	October 27, 2008
The Gurren-Lagann and the Arc-Gurren join together to form the massive Arc-Gurren-Lagann and stop the Human Annihilation System.
23	"Let's Go, This is the Final Battle"; Transliteration: "Iku zo saigo no tatakai da" (Japanese: 行くぞ 最後の戦いだ)	Ryūichi Kimura	Kazuki Nakashima	September 2, 2007	November 3, 2008
The members of Team Dai-Gurren make their preparations for the imminent war against the Anti-Spirals, but Rossiu is missing. However, when Kinon tells Simon about what he really intends to do, both start to look desperately for him.
24	"I'll Never Forget This Minute, This Second"; Transliteration: "Wasureru mono ka kono ippun ichibyō o" (Japanese: 忘れるものか この一分一秒を)	Katsuichi Nakayama	Kurasumi Sunayama	September 9, 2007	November 3, 2008
Guided by Simon and Nia's feelings for each other, Team Dai-Gurren break through dimensions in search for the Anti-Spirals' homeworld. But after falling into the enemy's trap, they end up losing some of their most precious members, due to its vicious offensive.
25	"I Accept Your Last Wish!"; Transliteration: "Omae no ishi wa uketotta!" (Japanese: お前の遺志は受け取った!)	Tōru Yoshida	Hiroshi Yamaguchi; Kazuki Nakashima	September 16, 2007	November 10, 2008
Team Dai-Gurren struggles to escape from the ocean of despair created by the Anti-Spirals without success, until history repeats itself, as another irreplaceable member of the Team sacrifices himself to save the others.
26	"Let's Go, Buddy"; Transliteration: "Iku ze dachikō" (Japanese: 行くぜ ダチ公)	Masahiko Ōtsuka	Kazuki Nakashima	September 23, 2007	November 10, 2008
After merging with Lorgenome's ship and transforming into the gigantic Super Galaxy Gurren-Lagann, Simon and his friends successfully fight back against the enemy. However, the enemy traps them in a world of dreams and desires. Just when all hope seems lost, an ally from the past reappears.
27	"The Lights in the Sky Are Stars"; Transliteration: "Ten no hikari wa subete hoshi" (Japanese: 天の光はすべて星)	Hiroyuki Imaishi	Kazuki Nakashima	September 30, 2007	November 10, 2008
Simon and Nia are reunited. Team Dai-Gurren uses their combined spiral power to merge everyone together and create the galaxy-sized Tengen Toppa Gurren-Lagann, engaging the Anti-Spirals in a decisive battle for the fate of the universe.

== Gurren Lagann Parallel Works ==
In conjunction with the release of the movie, Gainax released a series of music videos entitled Gurren Lagann Parallel Works which contains alternative stories of Gurren Lagann set to songs from the original soundtrack. The first series was released on June 15, 2008. A second series with seven videos, Parallel Works 2, was released on May 26, 2010.

No.	Title	Directed by	Original release date
1	"Rap is a Man's Soul! We Surpass the Impossible, and Kick Reason to the Curb! Open Your Ears Wide and Listen to Team Dai-Gurren's Theme"; Transliteration: "Rappu wa Otoko no Tamashii da! Muri o Tōshite Dōri o Kettobasu! Ore Tachi Dai-Gurren Dan no Tēma o Mimi no Ana Kappojitte Yo~ku Kikiyagare" (Japanese: ラップは漢の魂だ! 無理を通して道理を蹴っ飛ばす! 俺たち大グレン団のテーマを耳の穴かっぽじってよ〜く聴きやがれ)	Keisuke Watanabe	June 15, 2008
In a medieval Europe setting, Simon, Kamina and Viral infiltrate a castle where Nia is held captive by a Grand Zamboa-like enemy. Viral's wife and Yoko also make appearances.
2	"BafBaf! Being Fired Up Like This... Don't You Like It?"; Transliteration: "BafBaf! Sonna ni Moeru no ga...Suki Kai?" (Japanese: BafBaf!そんなに燃えるのが...好きかい?)	SUEZEN	June 22, 2008
Viral encounters a pachinko Gunmen, and then unleashes it on Kamina, Yoko and Simon.
3	"Tits vs. Tits"; Transliteration: "Boin VS Boin" (Japanese: ボインVSボイン)	Hirokazu Kojima	June 29, 2008
A version of the series in an artistically-stylized medieval Japan setting.
4	"Bust Through the Heavens With Your XXX!"; Transliteration: "Omae no XXX de Ten o Tsuke!" (Japanese: お前のXXXで天を衝け!)	Ryōji Masuyama	July 6, 2008
In a steampunk wild west theme, Viral is a horse riding hero leading the oppressed beastmen against Kamina, riding Dai-Gurren as a roving bandit.
5	"Rap is a Man's Soul! Open Your Ears Wide and Listen to the Great Kamina's Theme, the Man Who Believes in Himself and Surges at Heaven!"; Transliteration: "Rappu wa Otoko no Tamashii da! Onore o Shinjite Ten o Yubi Sasu Dotō no Otoko, Kamina-sama no Tēma o Mimi no Ana Kappojitte Yōku Kikiyagare" (Japanese: ラップは漢の魂だ! 己を信じて天を指差す怒涛の男·カミナ様のテーマを耳の穴かっぽじってよ〜く聴きやがれ)	Shin Itagaki	July 13, 2008
A nude Gimmy steals articles of clothing from Simon, Kamina and Yoko using kancho.
6	"To Hell With Combining!"; Transliteration: "Gattai Nante Kuso Kurae" (Japanese: 合体なんてクソくらえ)	Akira Amemiya	July 20, 2008
In a modern-looking alternate setting, humans pilot Lagann and Gurren against Beastmen-like enemies in Gunmen and then team up with other humans against a Dai-Gunmen.
7	"'Libera Me' from Hell"	Hiroyuki Yamaga	August 15, 2008
An experimental real world look at the environment of the surface portrayed in the first half of the series, which includes the shadow of a man running and a skull motif, possibly in reference to Kamina's father.
8	"All You Bastards, Get Fired Up!"; Transliteration: "Omaera Zen'in Moete Shimae!" (Japanese: お前ら全員燃えてしまえっ!!!)	Yoh Yoshinari	September 14, 2008
The story of Lordgenome's past, with the first war against the Anti-Spirals, Lordgenome's descent into madness and the rise of the Beastmen.
9	"Kittan Zero" (Japanese: キタンゼロ)	Sushio	May 26, 2010
An adventure of the Black siblings set just after they met Kamina and Simon, detailing how Kittan came into possession of his gunman.
10	"The sense of Wonder"	Akemi Hayashi	May 26, 2010
A love story about Simon and Nia.
11	"My XXX is the Best in the Universe" (Japanese: オレノxxxハウチュウヒトツ)	Gekidan Inu Curry	May 26, 2010
A video in the visual style of Nia's flashback.
12	"Goodbye Dai-Gurren" (Japanese: さよならダイグレン)	Shōko Nishigaki	May 26, 2010
Gimmy and Darry find a series of mysterious doors in the underbelly of the Dai-Gurren.
13	"Big Building"	Ayumu Kotake; Shintarō Dōge	May 26, 2010
A strange, sentai-esque story starring Simon and Rossiu
14	"Kiyal's Magical Time, Three Minutes Before" (Japanese: キヤルのマジカルタイム、三分前)	Satoshi Yamaguchi	May 26, 2010
A magical girl style video focusing on Kiyal.
15	"Gunmen Symphonia" (Japanese: ガンメンシンフォニア)	Shouji Saeki; Shingo Abe	May 26, 2010
A story about the development of Gunmen.

=== Film ===
Title	Directed by	Written by	Original release date	English release date
Gurren Lagann the Movie: Childhood's End	Hiroyuki Imaishi	Kazuki Nakashima	September 6, 2008	January 16, 2024
Gurren Lagann the Movie: The Lights in the Sky Are Stars	Hiroyuki Imaishi	Kazuki Nakashima	April 25, 2009	January 23, 2024

== Music videos ==
No.	Title	Original air/release date	English air date
1	"Kirameki Yoko Box – Pieces of Sweet Stars"	May 27, 2009	N/A
A music video starring Yoko Littner. Featured on a limited edition DVD pack called "Kirameki Yoko Box – Pieces of Sweet Stars", hence the music video's name. The music video was featured on a 1 out of 2 disc DVD from the DVD pack, released on May 27, 2009.
