= Yoh Yoshinari =

Japanese anime director

- 吉成 曜
- Born: May 6, 1971 (age 55); Tokyo, Japan
- Occupations: Anime director, animator, character designer, storyboard artist, illustrator
- Years active: 1992–present
- Known for: Little Witch Academia; BNA: Brand New Animal
- Family: Koh Yoshinari (older brother)

You Yoshinari (吉成 曜, Yoshinari Yō; born May 6, 1971) is a Japanese anime director, key animator, and storyboard artist.

== Biography ==
=== Early life ===
Yoshinari was born in Tokyo on May 6, 1971. He graduated from Tokyo Designer Gakuin College.

=== Career ===
Yoshinari entered the anime industry through the influence of his older brother, Kou Yoshinari. Several of his early works were uncredited second key animation and in-betweens for his brother during high school. After leaving professional school, he applied to Gainax and Madhouse. Not receiving a response from Gainax, he joined Madhouse. Due to a misunderstanding, Gainax failed to process his application until three months later. Not wanting to explain, Yoshinari told Madhouse "being an animator is too hard for me", and switched to Gainax.

At Gainax, Yoshinari had joined just after the closure of Nadia: The Secret of Blue Water. With nothing to do, he was immediately put onto visual development for the film Aoki Uru. The brief turn around after Nadia put Yoshinari on the fast track to becoming a key animator.

== Animation style and influences ==
He is recognized by the way he represents volume and perspective using spheres, especially for smoke and explosions, as well as his character action in general. He remarks Nijitte Monogatari is one of his most important influences, with his artistic style particularly visible in his design work for Tengen Toppa Gurren Lagann, and Little Witch Academia. His favorite American creators are Genndy Tartakovsky, Craig McCracken and Lauren Faust.

== Notable works ==
- Neon Genesis Evangelion (key animator, mechanical animation director)
- The End of Evangelion (key animator, assistant animation director)
- Dead Leaves (key animator)
- Mahoromatic (key animator)
- Medabots (key animator)
- One Piece: Baron Omatsuri and the Secret Island (key animator)
- Valkyrie Profile (video game) (concept art, character designer)
- Valkyrie Profile 2: Silmeria (concept art, character designer)
- FLCL (storyboard artist, key animator)
- Diebuster (key animator)
- This Ugly Yet Beautiful World (key animator, creature design)
- Evangelion: 2.0 You Can (Not) Advance (key animator)
- Gurren Lagann (mechanical design)
- Gurren Lagann Parallel Works (director, animation director, storyboard artist, key animator, ep. 8)
- Panty & Stocking with Garterbelt (concept art, animation director, key animation, ep. 12B)
- Little Witch Academia (concept creator, director, character designer, animation director)
- Kill la Kill (storyboard artist, key animator)
- Kizumonogatari (key animator, part 1, 3)
- Space Patrol Luluco (effect artist)
- Promare (storyboard artist, key animator)
- BNA: Brand New Animal (director)
- Cyberpunk: Edgerunners (character designer)
