= Valkyrie Profile =

Video game series

- Logo of Valkyrie Profile
- Genre: Role-playing
- Developers: tri-Ace; Soleil
- Publishers: Enix (1999–2000); Square Enix (2006–present)
- Creator: Masaki Norimoto Yoshiharu Gotanda
- Artists: Ko Yoshinari; Yoh Yoshinari
- Composer: Motoi Sakuraba
- Platforms: PlayStation, PlayStation Portable, PlayStation 2, Nintendo DS, PlayStation 3, Android, iOS, Windows, PlayStation 4, PlayStation 5
- First release: Valkyrie Profile; December 22, 1999
- Latest release: Valkyrie Elysium; September 29, 2022

Valkyrie Profile (ヴァルキリープロファイル, Varukirī Purofairu) or Valkyrie (ヴァルキリー, Varukirī) is a series of role-playing video games created by Masaki Norimoto and Yoshiharu Gotanda, primarily developed by tri-Ace and published by Square Enix (formerly Enix). The series is notable for featuring elements from Norse mythology.

== Common elements ==
The Valkyrie Profile series has been distinguished for its inventive gameplay. Aesthetically, the series is known for its muted colors and melancholic ambiance. As the player, one usually takes the role of a valkyrie, one of a host of female figures who choose warriors who may die in battle and lead them into the afterlife, though sometimes one plays as a mortal called upon by the divine beings.

== Games ==
Title	Year	Platform	Developer	Notes
Valkyrie Profile	JP: 1999; NA: 2000	PlayStation, PlayStation Portable, iOS, Android	tri-Ace; Tose (PSP)	An enhanced port, Valkyrie Profile: Lenneth, was released for the PlayStation Portable in Japan and North America in 2006 and in the PAL region in 2007.
Valkyrie Profile 2: Silmeria	JP: 2006; NA: 2006; PAL: 2007	PlayStation 2	tri-Ace	The second game of the series, taking place hundreds of years before the original game.
Valkyrie Profile: Covenant of the Plume	JP: 2008; NA: 2009; PAL: 2009	Nintendo DS	tri-Ace	Known as Valkyrie Profile: The Accused One (ヴァルキリープロファイル 咎を背負う者) in Japan, it is a prequel to the original game.
Valkyrie Anatomia	JP: 2016; WW: 2019	iOS, Android	Dokidoki Grooveworks	Ended service in 2020 worldwide and in 2021 in Japan.
Valkyrie Elysium	WW: 2022	Windows, PlayStation 4, PlayStation 5	Soleil Inc.	Action role-playing game and the third home console installment for the series.

== Music ==
The music of all the Valkyrie Profile games was composed by Motoi Sakuraba. Valkyrie Profile 2: Silmeria has two original soundtracks, Alicia and Silmeria. Each soundtrack is divided into two discs totalling 70 songs from the game. Prior to the release, a special artifact box was released which included a copy of the game, ten musical tracks, a keychain, and a figurine. The in-game score was written as MIDI tracks, allowing it to fit easily onto the DS cartridge. Drawing from the darker themes of the narrative, Sakuraba created a subdued and emotional score that noticeably moved away from his score for Silmeria while still being separate from his work on Valkyrie Profile. The score included original composition and arranged versions of tracks from Sakuraba's scores for Valkyrie Profile. The soundtrack conversion for the DS cartridge was done by sound design studio Noisycroak. A two-disc soundtrack album was published by Square Enix's music label on November 5, 2008. For the album release, Sakuraba used the MIDI originals as reference and redid all the tracks with full orchestration. While faithful to the original, the larger range of sounds resulted in some differences. A twelve-track arrange album, handled by Sakuraba, was published alongside the main soundtrack album. Producer Yoshinori Yamagishi mentioned his favorite way of drawing out emotion in players was through music and sound effects, helping to both immerse new players in the world of the game and play upon the nostalgia of series fans. The game utilizes a mixture of music from the franchise and new compositions.

== Printed adaptations ==
Several manga have been written based on the series. They are Valkyrie Profile, Valkyrie Profile 2: Silmeria, and Valkyrie Profile: The Dark Alchemist. A manga anthology called Valkyrie Profile Enix Supercomic Gekijoh is based on the PlayStation Portable version of Valkyrie Profile: Lenneth.

== Reception ==
Sales and review scores
Game	Units sold	Famitsu	Metacritic
Valkyrie Profile	709,000	35/40	81/100
Valkyrie Profile: Lenneth	248,000	-	80/100
Valkyrie Profile 2: Silmeria	400,000 (JP)	34/40	84/100
Valkyrie Profile: Covenant of the Plume	230,000	32/40	74/100
Valkyrie Elysium	40,362 (JP)	33/40	65/100

Overall, the Valkyrie Profile series received positive critical reception both in Japan and the West. The series has shipped 2.2 million copies by 2016.

Some Valkyrie Profile games have been included in various lists of top games. In a 2006 reader's poll conducted by Famitsu, the first Valkyrie Profile was voted the 27th best video game of all time. Valkyrie Profile: Lenneth received IGN's award for Best PSP RPG of 2006. Valkyrie Profile 2: Silmeria received IGN's award for "Best Game No One Played".
