= BNA: Brand New Animal =

Japanese anime television series

- Promotional poster

BNA ビー・エヌ・エー (Bī Enu Ē)
- Genre: Action comedy; Science fantasy
- Created by: Trigger
- Anime television series
- Directed by: Yoh Yoshinari
- Produced by: Yuka Okayasu; Eri Isobe
- Written by: Kazuki Nakashima
- Music by: Mabanua
- Studio: Trigger
- Licensed by: Netflix
- Original network: Fuji TV (+Ultra), BS Fuji, Kansai TV, THK, TNC, UHB, ABA
- Original run: April 8, 2020 – June 24, 2020
- Episodes: 12
- Light novel

BNA Zero: Massara ni Narenai Kemono-tachi
- Written by: Nekise Ise
- Illustrated by: Trigger
- Published by: Shueisha
- Imprint: Dash X Bunko
- Published: April 23, 2020
- Manga
- Written by: Asano
- Published by: Shueisha
- Imprint: Jump Comics
- Magazine: Tonari no Young Jump
- Original run: May 29, 2020 – September 9, 2022
- Volumes: 1
- icon

BNA: Brand New Animal (Japanese: BNA ビー・エヌ・エー, Hepburn: Bī Enu Ē), simply known as BNA, is an original Japanese anime television series produced by Trigger and directed by Yoh Yoshinari. The series' first six episodes premiered on Netflix in Japan in March 2020; another six episodes premiered in May of the same year. The series also aired on Fuji TV's +Ultra anime programming block from April to June 2020.

== Plot ==
The series is set in a world where humans co-exist with a branch of humanity called beastmen, who face persecution for their ability to turn into humanoid animals through a trait in DNA called "beast factor". The series centers on Michiru Kagemori, a young teenage girl who suddenly turned into a beastman after her best friend Nazuna Hiwatashi was abducted following a blood transfusion. Michiru runs away to seek refuge in Anima City, a haven made for the beastmen, and meets the mysterious wolf beastman Shirou Ogami, who works for the city's mayor, Barballet Rosé. The two work to investigate the circumstances of Michiru's transformation while maintaining peace in Anima City, only to stumble into a conspiracy involving Sylvasta Pharmaceuticals prestige medical research center in Anima City, whose unsavory employees were responsible for accidentally providing the blood used in Michiru's transformation along with Nazuna. The company placed Nazuna in a cult to claim herself as the beastmens' guardian deity known as the Silver Wolf. However, Michiru learns the real Silver Wolf is Shirou, who was forced to reveal his true power when dealing with the Sylvasta researcher Yaba, who mutated into a crazed monster following his arrest. Michiru learns Shirou is an immortal who gained his powers as the sole survivor of Nirvasyl, a city of beastmen destroyed a millennium ago by humans, and has since dedicated himself to protecting his kind. Alan Sylvasta, the owner of Sylvasta Pharmaceuticals, reveals the beastmen of Nirvasyl were victims of a stress-induced phenomenon called Nirvasyl Syndrome, that caused them to kill each other before the humans finished them off. Alan also explains he is resolving the issue by having Nazuna pretend to be the Silver Wolf while developing a drug to turn beastmen into humans should they go berserk. But Alan's actual plan is to induce Nirvasyl Syndrome, having Nazuna exposed on stage while revealing himself to be a beastman from a pure bloodline. After the pair learns the cure to Nirvasyl Syndrome is Michiru and Nazuna's blood, the crisis is averted, with Michiru accepting her condition while remaining in Anima City to help Shirou protect it.

== Characters ==
Michiru Kagemori (影森 みちる, Kagemori Michiru)
Voiced by: Sumire Morohoshi (Japanese); Cherami Leigh (English)
A human high schooler who turned into a tanuki beastman and came to Anima City to find a way to turn herself back to normal, believing her transformation was initially a disease before learning it was the result of being infused with beastman blood while in the hospital. Due to the circumstances of her transition into a beastman, Michiru can access the traits of other animals and stretch her form to massive lengths.
Shirou Ogami (大神 士郎, Ōgami Shirō)
Voiced by: Yoshimasa Hosoya (Japanese); Ben Diskin (English)
A wolf beastman with a keen sense of smell who dedicates himself to protecting Anima City. He possesses immense strength and regenerative abilities along with immortality and the ability to turn into a giant wolf. Shirou is later revealed to have been a normal beastman who lived in the city of Nirvasyl a millennia prior, but was killed by Raymond Sylvasta along with the other Nirvasyl residents when they went berserk. Shiro gained his powers after being revived from absorbing the blood of 2,000 Nirvasyl beastmen corpses, creating the myth of the Silver Wolf (銀狼, Ginrou) as he dedicated his life to protecting beastmen.
Nazuna Hiwatashi (日渡 なずな, Hiwatashi Nazuna)
Voiced by: Maria Naganawa (Japanese); Xanthe Huynh (English)
Michiru's best friend and classmate, who had aspirations of becoming an idol prior to becoming a kitsune beastman as a result of being infused with beastman blood while hospitalized. She was taken in by Sylvasta Pharmaceuticals to refine her abilities to alter her form. Alan convinces Nazuna to join the Silver Wolf cult alongside Boris Cliff under the alias of Déesse Louve to pose as the Silver Wolf, tricking her into believing she is helping the beastmen.
Alan Sylvasta (アラン・シルヴァスタ, Aran Shiruvuasuta)
Voiced by: Kaito Ishikawa (Japanese); Robbie Daymond (English)
A rich, enigmatic entrepreneur and the president of Sylvasta Pharmaceuticals, who provides medical support to Anima City while expressing an interest in Michiru and Shirou for their unique physical capabilities. His ancestor Raymond Sylvasta was responsible for destroying Nirvasyl when its resident beastmen went berserk, and Alan is aware of Shirou's identity as the Silver Wolf. He intends to humanize all beastmen that succumb to Nirvasyl Syndrome, and later reveals himself to be a pureblood beastman with a golden Cerberus version of Shirou's Silver Wolf form, revealing his prejudiced motives in eliminating Anima City's residents for being impure beastmen.
Barballet Rosé (バルバレイ・ロゼ, Barubarei Roze)
Voiced by: Gara Takashima (Japanese); Cindy Robinson (English)
The mayor of Anima City, who is a naked mole-rat beastman with a Ph.D. in beastman genetics. She is also a long-time acquaintance of Shirou and is aware of his identity as the Silver Wolf, as he rescued her from a research facility when she was a child. She is also aware of Michiru's condition, which is assumed to be a disease at the time, and pledges to help find her a cure while keeping it a secret to prevent mass panic.
Marie Itami (マリー伊丹, Marī Itami)
Voiced by: Michiyo Murase (Japanese); Reba Buhr (English)
A mink beastman who is involved in shady dealings. She occasionally helps Michiru, but asks for a favor in exchange for her help.
Yūji Tachiki (立木 勇次, Tachiki Yūji)
Voiced by: Hiroshi Naka (Japanese); Jake Green (English)
A Great Dane beastman who works as a police inspector and sometimes relies on Ogami for help.
Gem Horner (ジェム・ホーナー, Jemu Hōnā)
Voiced by: Hiroshi Yanaka (Japanese); Keith Silverstein (English)
A cockerel beastman and Melissa's husband, who give Michiru a place to stay. He and his wife are devoted believers and worshippers of the Silver Wolf.
Melissa Horner (メリッサ・ホーナー, Merissa Hōnā)
Voiced by: Kimiko Saitō (Japanese); Laura Post (English)
A wombat beastman and Gem's wife. She and her husband are devoted believers and worshippers of the Silver Wolf.
Giuliano Flip (ジュリアーノ・フリップ, Juriāno Furippu)
Voiced by: Yōhei Tadano (Japanese); Jamieson Price (credited as Taylor Henry) (English)
A beluga whale beastman who is the head of a powerful gang and Nina's father. He has an immense hatred for humans because his father, Nina's grandfather, was killed by beastman hunters. then cooked and eaten. However, Nina says it did not happen, and is just the story she was told.
Prime Minister Shiramizu (白水 総理, Shiramizu Sōri)
Voiced by: Hōchū Ōtsuka (Japanese); Joe Ochman (credited as Joseph Whimms) (English)
A human who is the presiding Prime Minister of Japan. He worked with Mayor Rosé to establish Anima City, but harbors distrust towards beastmen and is willing to infringe on their rights.
Nina Flip (ニナ・フリップ, Nina Furippu)
Voiced by: Ami Maeshima (Japanese); Erika Harlacher (English)
A dolphin beastman who is the daughter of Giuliano Flip and Michiru's friend. She has never been outside of Anima City.
Jackie (ジャッキー, Jakkī)
Voiced by: Megumi Han (Japanese); Erika Harlacher (English)
A young and naïve bear beastman that Michiru often encounters.
Boris Cliff (ボリス・クリフ, Borisu Kurifu)
Voiced by: Takehito Koyasu (Japanese); Griffin Puatu (English)
A snake beastman and the head priest of the Silver Wolf Order cult, who has taken a strong interest in Nazuna.
Pinga (ピンガ, Pinga)
Voiced by: Daisuke Namikawa (Japanese); Tony Azzolino (English)
An albatross beastman mercenary who once fought as a soldier against anti-beastmen radicals, only to become disillusioned over the government infringing on the rights of migratory beastmen.

== Release ==
During Anime Expo 2019, Trigger revealed that they were producing a new original anime television series directed by Yoh Yoshinari and written by Kazuki Nakashima. The series' characters were designed by Yusuke Yoshigaki, and its music was composed by Mabanua.

The series premiered on Fuji TV's +Ultra anime programming block, BS Fuji, and other channels from April 8 to June 24, 2020. Prior to its Japanese television debut, the show's first six episodes were streamed on Netflix in Japan on March 21, 2020. The other six were later available on May 6, 2020. Distributed by Toho, the series was released in three volumes on DVD and Blu-ray in Japan. The first volume was released on August 19, 2020, while the other two gets a September 16 and October 14 release respectively. The opening theme, "Ready To", is performed by Sumire Morohoshi as Michiru Kagemori, while electronic musician AAAMYYY does the ending theme, "Night Running".

BNA: Brand New Animal was released worldwide on June 30, 2020, on Netflix.

== Episodes ==
No.	Title	Original release date
1	"Runaway Raccoon"	March 21, 2020 (Netflix Japan); April 8, 2020 (+Ultra)
In a world where both humans and beastmen exist, a tanuki beastman named Michiru Kagemori travels to the beastman-dedicated city, Anima City, with help from a shady mink beastman named Marie Itami, who had just saved her from hunters. Upon arriving, Michiru finds the city in the midst of a festival celebrating its tenth anniversary, and her wallet is stolen. While trying to track down the thief, Michiru is caught up in a bombing, where she is saved by a wolf beastman named Shirou Ogami. Discovering that the bomb was planted by mercenaries paid by anti-beastman humans to sabotage the festival, Shirou violently beats up the attackers before he is stopped by Michiru, who reveals she used to be human.
2	"Rabbit Town"	March 21, 2020 (Netflix Japan); April 15, 2020 (+Ultra)
As Shirou remains doubtful of Michiru's claims that she is a human, Michiru is told by Marie to meet with Grand Grandma in Rabbit Town to retrieve her stolen wallet. Michiru begins teaching orphan kids how to read and write, until Grand Grandma is pressured into selling them all off to pay off a debt to a gang. While attempting to escape with the children in tow, Michiru becomes able to change the size of her arms to free herself. After Grand Grandma is arrested, Michiru becomes upset with Shirou for not intervening sooner, proving with her student ID that she was human. She then declares her hatred for beastmen due to their cruelty and disregard of life, and vows to find a way to cure her "beastman-itis" and leave the city.
3	"Rhino Melancholy"	March 21, 2020 (Netflix Japan); April 22, 2020 (+Ultra)
The mayor of Anima City, Barballet Rosé, approaches Shirou about stopping bombers from attacking the city's medical center. Supposing the center may be able to help cure her alleged disease, Michiru reveals her condition to Barballet and insists she aid her. Although Michiru and Shirou stop a gang from sneaking into the center, an explosion still goes off, which Shirou deduces was caused by two of the doctors trying to eliminate evidence. One of the doctors tries to hold Michiru hostage, but Shirou manages to save her.
4	"Dolphin Daydream"	March 21, 2020 (Netflix Japan); April 29, 2020 (+Ultra)
Michiru meets and befriends Nina, the dolphin beastman daughter of the gang boss Giuliano Flip, who has been posting to social media in human form close by. Managing to regain the ability to turn into human form, Michiru joins Nina as she attends a human party, which initially seems to accept Nina even after she accidentally reveals herself as a beastman. During the party, however, one of the girls puts Nina into a fish tank without realizing she cannot actually breathe, as she is a mammal who does not have gills. This forces Michiru to use her transformation powers to save Nina, and the two flee back to Anima City. Despite the incident, Nina feels happy about the experience and their time together.
5	"Greedy Bears"	March 21, 2020 (Netflix Japan); May 6, 2020 (+Ultra)
While watching a deadly baseball game, Michiru's powers catch the attention of the Bears team, helping them win their match as their pitcher. Having fun for the first time since becoming a beastman and arriving in the city, Michiru continues to play with them, unaware that their coach, Dante, has been gambling on them losing. Shirou discovers that Dante was the first beastman to play professional baseball, but he'd ultimately been removed from the game after violently lashing out at his bigoted hecklers and teammates. During a finals match, where the team is being bribed to lose, an incident in which Dante attempts to steal all the gambled money for himself leads to the crowd getting angry once they discover their money has been taken. As Shirou works to resolve the matter, Michiru shows the importance of what baseball truly means, and despite the Bears ultimately losing, they appreciate playing fair and square. Dante, inspired by Michiru's courage and dedication to the game, rekindles his love of baseball, quits gambling, and dedicates himself to training his team seriously in order to help them win the next championship.
6	"Fox Waltz"	March 21, 2020 (Netflix Japan); May 13, 2020 (+Ultra)
Michiru happens to encounter Nazuna Hiwatashi, her best friend and former classmate from school who caught the "beastman-itis" before she did. With the ability to turn into a white fox, she has become the figurehead of the Silver Wolf cult dedicated to the mythology of the silver wolf Ginrou, sacred deity of the beastmen. Wanting to help cure Nazuna's condition too, Michiru arranges for Nazuna to meet with Mayor Rosé. However, Nazuna takes advantage of the situation to secure a settlement for Silver Wolf. She states that she prefers being an idol having no need of friendship, leaving Michiru downhearted. In anger, Michiru renounces her friendship to Nazuna over her selfish actions.
7	"Easy Albatross"	May 6, 2020 (Netflix Japan); May 20, 2020 (+Ultra)
Michiru meets an albatross beastman named Pinga whose species has faced trouble migrating due to international flight restrictions imposed on them by humans. Meanwhile, Alan Sylvasta, head of Sylvasta Pharmaceuticals, meets with Mayor Rosé and Shirou and advises against giving the Silver Wolf cult refuge in Anima City. Pinga flies Michiru across the city, however, Shirou suspects that Pinga may be a terrorist. Spotting Pinga approaching the Mayor's office, Shirou stops him with the help of Michiru's surprising new flight ability. Finding his planned terrorism was a bluff to get him close enough to meet the mayor, Shirou decides to let him go. Meanwhile, Alan is attacked by a flying hitman, but is rescued by Nazuna.
8	"The Mole Rat Speaks"	May 6, 2020 (Netflix Japan); May 27, 2020 (+Ultra)
Following Alan's rescue, support for the Silver Wolf cult increases, leading to their refuge being approved. Just as Shirou and Michiru go to visit the prison to find out the assassin's motives, Yaba, one of the doctors that Shirou stopped before, goes berserk following a visit from Silver Wolf priest Cliff Boris. As both Shirou and Michiru struggle against the powered-up beastman, Shirou is forced to reveal his true identity as the legendary wolf Ginrou to Michiru in order to defeat Yaba. While Shirou recovers, Mayor Rosé explains to Michiru how Shirou became Ginrou over a thousand years ago, when the beastmen of his village of Nirvasyl were allegedly wiped out by humans.
9	"Human Scapegoat"	May 6, 2020 (Netflix Japan); June 3, 2020 (+Ultra)
While Shirou investigates what made Yaba go berserk, Michiru attempts to convince Nazuna that Ginrou is real, but fails. She then sees Nazuna apparently being abducted and breaks into the medical center to rescue her, only to discover she is there for an MRI scan. Alan then tells Michiru that she and Nazuna became beastmen as a result of a Sylvasta Pharmaceuticals blood transfusion mishap and he is working with Nazuna to develop a cure. He reveals that it was his idea to have Nazuna pretend to be Ginrou to give the beastmen something to believe in, a religion of their own that does not center humans. Meanwhile, Alan has a clandestine meeting with Prime Minister Shiramizu and offers him some new technology.
10	"Rabid Wolf"	May 6, 2020 (Netflix Japan); June 10, 2020 (+Ultra)
Michiru and Shirou encounter another berserk beastman and attempt to take him down when a group of drones called Engel Machines appear and capture it with tranquilizer darts. They follow the drones to the medical center, where they find that the drones were sent by Alan. He tells them that the berserk effect is due to "Nirvasyl Syndrome", the result of stress caused by multiple species of beastmen living together, and claims that this is what wiped out Shirou's village. Alan reveals he intends to prevent the syndrome by developing a vaccine to turn beastmen into regular humans, but Shirou becomes furious at the idea. Alan asks Michiru and Nazuna to hold a concert to calm the beastmen until the vaccine is complete. Meanwhile, Mayor Rosé plans to dismantle Anima City to disperse the beastmen to keep them safe. However, when she goes to inform Prime Minister Shiramizu of her decision, he abducts her and places her under arrest, revealing that he is working with Alan.
11	"A Beastly Feast"	May 6, 2020 (Netflix Japan); June 17, 2020 (+Ultra)
Mayor Rosé escapes captivity and heads back to Anima City with Pinga's help, who flies her over the guarded border. Marie informs Shirou that Nazuna, at Boris' suggestion, is planning to reveal that she is a human during her concert. Shirou tells Michiru that Nazuna's confession will actually trigger Nirvasyl Syndrome, and Michiru convinces Nazuna at the last minute not to make the confession, only for Boris to step in and expose her himself. The surprising betrayal sets off a chain reaction of the syndrome within the beastmen, and the shock reawakens Shirou's memory, revealing Alan was right that the beastmen of his village had been the ones who began destroying each other, not the humans. The realization drives him to despair and he succumbs to the syndrome, then attacks and bites Michiru.
12	"Anima-City"	May 6, 2020 (Netflix Japan); June 24, 2020 (+Ultra)
Shirou suddenly returns to normal after biting Michiru. Meanwhile, while Alan informs Prime Minister Shiramizu that their plan to eliminate all beastmen has begun, Mayor Rosé discovers that Michiru's and Nazuna's blood can neutralize savage tendencies in beastmen and cure Nirvasyl Syndrome due to their unique DNA. When Michiru and Shirou confront Alan at the medical center, he reveals himself to be a purebred beastman who believes that others, including Shirou, are impure hybrids. Michiru finds that a recording on her phone of Shirou's howling calms rampaging, infected beastmen, and works with Nazuna and Marie to broadcast it across the city. Alan in his beastman form attempts to stop them, but Shirou defeats him, aided by Michiru's antibodies now in his blood. While Michiru broadcasts the signal, Shirou uses his howl to calm the beastmen until the serum finishes being widely distributed. With Alan's conspiracy revealed to the public, Mayor Rosé works toward a reconciliation between beastmen and humans, and opens Anima City to humans to promote mutual understanding and cooperation. Michiru decides to stay the way she is.

== Other media ==
=== Manga ===
A manga adaptation illustrated by Asano was serialized in Shueisha's Tonari no Young Jump web magazine from May 29, 2020, to September 9, 2022. Its sole volume was released on September 16, 2022.

=== Novel ===
A prequel novel, BNA Zero: Massara ni Narenai Kemono-tachi (The Animals That Can't Be Brand New) written by Nekise Ise, was released on April 23, 2020.

=== Soundtrack ===
The show's soundtrack was released on June 24, 2020.

== Reception ==
On Rotten Tomatoes, BNA has a 100% "fresh" rating based on six reviews. Lisa De La Cruz of CBR praised the anime as "captivating", having an "original storyline, bright and flashy visuals, and anthropomorphic animals" and notes that since anime fans are often disappointed in second seasons, she asks if the series should have a second season.

The Encyclopedia of Science Fiction described BNA: Brand New Animal as an entertaining anime, praising its visually appealing animation and Michiru as an impulsive but likeable protagonist. It noted that the series addresses themes including racism, cultural identity, eugenics and other forms of discrimination, but criticized it for treating these issues without much depth. The encyclopedia also argued that the late revelation that "pure-bred" beastmen secretly exercise power over human society complicates and weakens the series' allegory of beastmen as an oppressed minority.

=== Awards ===
BNA: Brand New Animal was nominated for an Ursa Major Award in the Best Dramatic Series category. The Ursa Major Awards are given in the field of furry fandom works and are the main awards in the field of anthropomorphism. BNA was also nominated for an Annie Award for Best Character Design in TV/Media.

== See also ==
- Zootopia, a 2016 film whose plot involves persecution against certain anthropomorphic animals
- With You, Our Love Will Make It Through, a series with a similar premise involving the tensions between humans and beast-folk
- Beastars, a series involving a cultural divide between anthropomorphic carnivores and herbivores
