= Valkyrie Profile (video game) =

1999 video game

- Japanese PlayStation cover art
- Developers: tri-Ace; Tose (PSP); FINE Co., Ltd. (Android, iOS)
- Publishers: Enix; Square Enix (Lenneth)
- Director: Yoshiharu Gotanda
- Producer: Yoshinori Yamagishi
- Designer: Masaki Norimoto
- Artists: Ko Yoshinari; Yoh Yoshinari
- Writer: Masaki Norimoto
- Composer: Motoi Sakuraba
- Series: Valkyrie Profile
- Platforms: PlayStation; PlayStation Portable; Android; iOS
- Release: PlayStation: JP: December 22, 1999; NA: August 29, 2000; Lenneth; PlayStation Portable: JP: March 2, 2006; NA: July 18, 2006; EU: April 27, 2007; AU: May 3, 2007; Android, iOS: JP: March 22, 2018; WW: May 28, 2018
- Genre: Role-playing
- Mode: Single-player

Valkyrie Profile (Note: Japanese: ヴァルキリープロファイル, Hepburn: Varukirī Purofairu) is a role-playing video game developed by tri-Ace and published by Enix for the PlayStation. It was released on December 22, 1999 in Japan and on August 29, 2000 in North America. Inspired by Norse mythology, Valkyrie Profile follows the titular valkyrie, Lenneth, as she travels through Midgard, collecting the souls of slain heroes to serve either as einherjar or her personal companions for Ragnarok - the battle to decide the fate of all creation - and trains them by fighting monsters and performing additional quests. As she journeys, she learns more about her original human life, removed from her memory upon becoming a Valkyrie.

The game was both a critical and commercial success; it sold over 700,000 copies, and critics praised the deep and complicated gameplay system and the plot. Valkyrie Profile received an enhanced port of the game, which was released for the PlayStation Portable in 2006 under the name Valkyrie Profile: Lenneth. It also led to two other games in the Valkyrie Profile series: a PlayStation 2 prequel, titled Valkyrie Profile 2: Silmeria, released in 2006 in Japan and North America and 2007 in Europe, and another prequel titled Valkyrie Profile: Covenant of the Plume, released for the Nintendo DS in Japan in 2008, March 17, 2009 in North America and on April 3 in PAL regions. The PlayStation Portable version of the game received an enhanced port for Android and iOS in March 2018, and a re-release for PlayStation 4 and PlayStation 5 using software emulation on December 22, 2022.

== Gameplay ==
Dungeon exploration plays more like a platform game than a traditional RPG, with Lenneth Valkyrie the only visible character and capable of jumping, sliding, swinging her sword, and shooting ice crystals. Ice crystals can make temporary steps and freeze enemies and are used for solving many puzzles. Upon contact with an unfrozen enemy, an RPG-style battle begins. Enemies are visible and attacking them gives Lenneth a first attack advantage in combat. Lenneth can also engage an enemy in battle by coming into contact with them; in this case, there is a 50% chance that the enemy will have the first attack.

3D world map

Travel on the world map occurs in a 3D third-person perspective, with Lenneth flying in the skies over Midgard. Pressing the Start button allows her to perform a "Spiritual Concentration", which reveals new dungeons, cities and towns, and recruitable einherjar, the souls of deceased warriors. When entering a city or town, the game switches to a 2D profile view and Lenneth will disguise herself as a human, allowing her to interact with inhabitants without drawing attention to herself.

Much of the game consists of Lenneth locating and recruiting new einherjar (with cut-scenes of the circumstances of their deaths), training them, and determining if and when to send them to Valhalla to fight alongside the Æsir. Character development for most of einherjar consists of their "death scenes", which are often dramatic and highly emotional and often steeped in symbolism and metaphors, and dialogue between them and the Gods while in Valhalla. Each chapter requires Lenneth to send at least one einherjar to Valhalla (with a maximum of two per chapter), preferably meeting a set of requirements outlined at the start of the chapter. This makes the einherjar that is sent unable to be selected again until the endgame (if they prove strong enough to survive), but the game compensates with a large cast of 21 einherjar (some of which are exclusive to Normal or even Hard difficulty).

The game is divided into eight chapters, each with different quests, dungeons, and items available. Each chapter is further divided into periods, depending on the difficulty (16 in Easy, 24 in Normal, and 28 in Hard). Visiting towns, dungeons, and recruiting einherjar use up periods, requiring that the player budget their available time. Once the periods in a chapter are up, the Sacred Phase begins, in which Lenneth returns to Asgard and Freya updates her on the status of the war with the Vanir and the fate of her einherjar in Valhalla.

Each Einherjar has a Hero Value, a number representing their combat strength and strength of character, and Lenneth must send einherjar with the proper hero values and skills to survive in Valhalla and keep Odin and Freya satisfied. Not sending Einherjar and opting to keep too many special artifacts awarded at the end of dungeons will lower Lenneth's Evaluation to 0, which triggers the worst possible ending (Ending C). Conversely, offering artifacts instead of keeping them and sending Einherjar that meet or exceed the chapter's requirements awards a number of bonuses. First, it tilts the divine war in the Æsir's favor and increases Lenneth's Evaluation. Second, to increases the number of Materialize Points that Freya grants during the Sacred Phase, which are analogous to money, as they can be transmutated into items and equipment and vice versa. Finally, it earns powerful artifacts from Odin.

It also has a group experience system: battle experience is divided among the active party members, but experience points obtained from dungeon exploration (Event EXP) such as solving puzzles and completing dungeons are banked for division among party members at the player's discretion. There are three difficulty levels: Easy, Normal, and Hard, with different available einherjar, dungeons, quests and mechanics. On Easy and Normal difficulty, the starting levels of einherjar vary, while on Hard difficulty, all characters start from Level 1. To compensate, there are more dungeons available and consequently more objectives that award Event EXP.

There are also three different endings. The "B" and "C" endings can be achieved in any difficulty level, while the "A" ending, which completes the entire story, is only available with the completion of certain tasks in the normal and hard difficulties. Also, the Seraphic Gate is only fully accessible in Hard.

=== Combat ===
The battle system

Valkyrie Profile has a unique turn-based battle system. The two sides wage battle during alternate turns, with the whole party sharing one turn and able to attack simultaneously during that turn. Each enemy is given their own turn and do not combine attacks with one another. Each of the party members is assigned to one of the buttons on the controller (Square, Triangle, Circle, or Cross). Pressing the corresponding button on the player's turn orders that character to attack. Fighters have three character-specific attacks each turn, though weapons can limit how many they can use. Mages cast their preset offensive spells, which builds up their CT (Charge Time). Charge Time replaces MP, decreases slowly on its own, and prevents casting spells when above 0. While a mage's CT decreases, they cannot perform any actions, though there are skills that allow exceptions to this.

Stringing attacks together produces combos that prevent a target from defending or recovering, yield Magic Crystals and Fire Gems that increase experience and reduce CT, and add to the Hit Gauge. When the Hit Gauge reaches 100% in one turn, a character that participated in the combo that filled the Hit Gauge may perform a special attack ("Purify Weird Soul") that causes great damage and refills the Hit Gauge, possibly allowing another character to use their Purify Weird Soul. Using a Purify Weird Soul causes CT to rise, so characters must wait several turns before they can perform another one. Fighters have unique Purify Weird Souls. Mages use either multi-hit versions of their selected spells or Great Magic, elaborate versions of their selected spells that strike all enemies. Only certain scepters allow the use of Great Magic; human-forged Great Magic-capable scepters have a high chance of breaking with such use, and unbreakable ether-coated ones are extremely rare. Damage is not capped so the party may attack an enemy until they no longer have any available moves rather than being limited to the total HP (health points) of the target.

At the beginning of each battle, Lenneth summons her einherjar to combat. As she is needed to keep them materialized, if Lenneth is defeated in combat, she must be revived within three turns or the party will be defeated. Lenneth is also the only character who cannot be voluntarily removed from the party at any point in the game.

Six weapon types are present: Light Sword, Heavy Sword, Katana, Lance, Bow, and Staff, corresponding to the six types of characters: light warrior, heavy warrior, samurai, lancer, archer, and mage. Most characters will only be able to equip their specified type of weapon (though some swords can be used by light and heavy warriors and samurai) and only certain weapons allow them to perform all three of their attacks (or Great Magic in the case of mages). Lenneth is the exception; she can equip both swords and bows and her Purify Weird Soul, Nibelung Valesti, changes accordingly. Some weapons run the risk of breaking with each use.

== Plot ==
=== Characters ===
There are 24 playable characters in the game. Some of them can only be obtained in normal or hard mode.

Lenneth is the primary protagonist of Valkyrie Profile, a recently awakened warrior-maiden and servant of Odin, who has been tasked with recruiting the einherjar to fight with the Æsir in their war against the Vanir and prevent the destruction of Asgard in Ragnarok. Lenneth is one of the three goddesses of fate (the other two being her sisters, Hrist and Silmeria) the three apparently share the same body, though only one is awake at any given time and can be distinguished by their hair color and armor.

Loki is revealed to be the final antagonist of Valkyrie Profile. He is half-Æsir and half-Vanir by blood. Although he has been accepted by the Æsir, he is not completely trusted by either side. Odin and Freya sealed his power so that he remains a young version of himself. He seeks the power of the Four Treasures, which will give him the power to challenge Odin.

=== Story ===
In the village of Coriander, a 14-year-old girl named Platina lives with her cruel parents. The village falls upon hard times and her friend Lucian finds out that her parents are going to sell her into slavery. The two run away, but Platina inhales the toxic pollen of poisonous flowers in a nearby field and dies in Lucian's arms.

Lenneth Valkyrie awakens in Asgard and is tasked by the god Odin and goddess Freya with recruiting the einherjar for their war with the Vanir and the coming of Ragnarok. Her first recruits are the princess Jelanda and mercenary Arngrim. After the arrogant Arngrim inadvertently embarrasses her father, Jelanda plots revenge but is kidnapped by a traitorous court minister and transformed into a monster. Lenneth helps Arngrim kill the monster and claims Jelanda as an einherjar. Arngrim, having unknowingly aided Jelanda's captors, kills the man responsible but commits suicide rather than be arrested. At Jelanda's request, Lenneth makes Arngrim an einherjar but Odin and Freya find him lacking the qualities of an einherjar and refuse to accept him into Valhalla so Arngrim remains at Lenneth's side.

During Lenneth's travels, she meets Brahms, lord of the undead and enemy of Odin, who possesses her sister Silmeria (due to circumstances explained in Valkyrie Profile 2: Silmeria); and the necromancer Lezard Valeth, who lures her to his tower. Lenneth learns that Lezard has been experimenting with half-elven homunculi to use as vessels to attain godhood. Lezard wants Lenneth for himself, but she refuses to cooperate and destroys his experiments. The sorceress Mystina, one of Lezard's rivals, discovers what he has been doing and takes his last remaining homunculus. When he discovers her theft, Lezard freezes her body while she is spirit walking, effectively killing her. Lenneth recruits her, though Odin and Freya refuse to accept Mystina into Valhalla and, like Arngrim, she remains with Lenneth.

=== B Ending ===
Playing through the game normally means that Ragnarok is fought at the Jotunheim Ice Fields, where the Æsir army under Thor's leadership charges the Vanir to open a path for Lenneth to storm the Jotunheim Palace and defeat Surt. At the start of the final stage, all surviving einherjar that she has sent to Valhalla rejoin the party.

Lenneth and company fight their way past Bloodbane, which awards her the sword Levantine (Levatienn), and on to the throne room, where Surt awaits and draws his flaming sword. When he is struck down, the Æsir prevail and the eternal reign of Odin and the Asgardians is assured as Freya puts Lenneth to sleep until she is needed again.

=== A Ending ===
Considered the true ending of the game, it fully explores the story and Lenneth's origins.

Lenneth eventually meets Lucian, who grew up to become a poor thief in Gerabellum. He notices that Lenneth resembles the silver-haired Platina, though Lenneth does not know who Platina is. Lucian later becomes an einherjar when he is killed by soldiers cleaning up the slums. Before he is sent to Valhalla, Lucian tells Lenneth he still loves Platina. Lenneth tells him to forget about her and kisses him before she sends him to Valhalla, but Lucian continues to brood upon Lenneth and Platina. Although Lenneth laments that love between mortals and gods is not possible after his departure, she states that she hopes he lives so they may meet again.

Meanwhile, in Valhalla, Lucian learns that valkyries "sleep" in Midgard, reincarnating in Asgard upon their human deaths. However, Odin and Freya seal their memories, as they might interfere with their valkyrie duties. Loki tells Lucian that the Water Mirror can be used to contact the valkyrie, though it is forbidden for anyone besides Odin to use. Lucian does so anyway and gives Lenneth an earring, telling her she will know where to find its match, but Lenneth is angry at him for his disobedience. Loki uses the distraction to steal the Dragon Orb and kills Lucian, using him as a scapegoat to cover his theft. When Lenneth returns to Asgard, Freya tells her of the Dragon Orb's theft and Lucian's death.

Lenneth finds the other earring at Platina's grave and her memories as Platina return. Sensing that the seal is broken, Odin performs the Sovereign's Rite, transmigrating Lenneth's soul and summoning Hrist. Hrist takes control of the valkyrie's body and tries to destroy her companions Arngrim and Mystina, who refuse to serve her, but Lenneth intervenes. The blast shatters Lenneth's soul and Mystina crystallizes the fragments to prevent them from dissipating. Lezard joins them and attempts to salvage the situation by fusing Lenneth's soul to a man-made Homunculus body, but it is a temporary measure with Lenneth's soul still decaying. To fully restore Lenneth's soul requires fusing it to valkyrie's original body whom Hrist is occupying. Hrist challenges the Vampire King, Brahms, to a duel on behalf of Odin's long ongoing war against the undead whom consume, desecrate, and defile the natural order of the living. Brahms allies with Arngrim, Mystina, and Lezard to defeat Hrist and separate her soul from valkyrie's body. Mystina and Lezard fuse Lenneth's soul, homunculus body, and the valkyrie's body to have Lenneth reborn. Her memories of Lucian and Platina intact, Lenneth is disgusted with how the gods manipulate humans and the suffering they cause.

Loki betrays the Æsir and travels deep within enemy Vanir territory to Jotunheim Palace. He offers Surt, the King of the Vanir, two of the four treasures along with Fenrir. They include the Dragon Orb and the Levantine sword within the Dragon Bloodbane. Ragnarok occurs and Loki, with the power of the Dragon Orb, takes his adult form. Surt refuses Loki's offer and is destroyed. Loki's new powers allow him to heavily besiege Asgard into ruin. He turns his attention to the Æsir, engaging Odin in battle. As one never truly accepted by the Æsir or the Vanir, Loki seeks to destroy everything. Though Odin is armed with the spear Gungnir, one of the Four Treasures, he is forced to divide its power to protect Freya. With the power divided between two, Loki overpowers and kills him. Upon learning Loki killed Odin, Lenneth decides to go after him. Freya begs her to call the other gods but she refuses to listen, saying they only cared for themselves instead of humanity. Freya claims because it's the law of nature that humans die and are reborn. Freya also admits to sealing Lenneth's memories for her own good, because she is a goddess. However, Lenneth is disgusted because Freya looks down on humans, saying Freya should pity humans instead of gods. Lenneth coldly leaves her, indicating she is no longer obeying Freya.

Returning to Asgard, Lenneth slays Fenrir and the dragon Bloodbane before confronting Loki. Lenneth obtains the demon sword Levantine, another one of the Four Treasures, from Bloodbane, and uses it in her battle with Loki. He reveals to her that she cannot utilize all the power of a Divine Treasure unless she is willing to sacrifice her friends (as dividing a Treasure's power is exactly what Odin did to save Freya, and died because of it). Loki unleashes the full power of the Dragon Orb, killing all of Lenneth's companions and destroying both Asgard and Midgard. Lenneth undergoes the process of fusing her soul back together with the valkyrie and homunculus body which allows her divine powers to grow. Her compassion for mankind and love for Lucian allows her to acquire the power of creation. In a flashback, Lezard explains to Mystina about his research. It is revealed that both god and goddess are unable to grow and thus remain static. The reason Odin is able to grow is because he is half-god and half-elf. Lezard believes if Lenneth's soul and his homunculi combine into one, Lenneth will receive godlike power. Lenneth undoes Loki's destruction and slays him, becoming the new Lord of Creation. She then turns to see Lucian, who has been reborn, and the two are reunited. Having recreated both Asgard and Midgard, Lenneth revives Midgard's slain humans and all of humanity becomes Lenneth's einherjar.

== Release ==
Several improvements were made to the English release of Valkyrie Profile, including more cinematics and the ability to adjust all characters' armor instead of just the active party as well as being informed when changing Lenneth's weapon from sword to bow. Some editing occurred during translation, but visible blood, drinking, and sexual comments remain. Badrach's smoking was cut out but the animation of him smoking after a successful battle remains, minus the cigarette.

=== Valkyrie Profile: Lenneth ===
Valkyrie Profile: Lenneth is the PlayStation Portable (PSP) port of the original Valkyrie Profile developed by Tose and published by Square Enix in 2006. The port is of the Japanese PlayStation version and does not have any of the gameplay improvements or changes made to the original English version, though the additional cinematics included in the English version are intact. Full motion video has been added to story events in the game and replaces all original anime scenes.

Lezard Valeth's teleportation circle was changed from a pink pentagram to a purple circle though this was left unchanged in the PlayStation Portable version. The names of Frei, the elder sister, and Freya, the younger, were reversed from Norse mythology and from the Japanese version (though in the former, Frei is the elder brother).

The English version of Lenneth uses an enhanced version of the original game's localization and reuses the original English voiceover track. Square Enix cleaned up the original game's English script and additional voice over dialogue for the CG movies was recorded by New Generation Pictures, rather than the original company, TAJ Productions.

In 2018, Lenneth was ported to the mobile platforms iOS and Android featuring enhanced graphics such as character portraits, text, and UI elements, the option to skip cutscenes, in-app purchases to unlock collectibles, as well as automating each combat encounter.

In 2022, Lenneth was made available via emulation on PlayStation 4 and PlayStation 5.

== Reception ==
Reception

Aggregate score
Aggregator	Score
Metacritic	PS: 81/100; PSP: 80/100

Review scores
Publication	Score
Famitsu	35/40
GameSpot	7.5/10
IGN	9.1/10
Next Generation	3/5
TouchArcade	4.5/5

Valkyrie Profile sold over 310,000 copies in Japan by the end of 1999. As of September 2005, the PlayStation version of Valkyrie Profile has sold over 709,000 copies worldwide of which 636,000 units were sold in Japan alone. Japan-GameCharts reports that 168,515 copies of Valkyrie Profile: Lenneth have been sold in Japan as of November 2008. Square Enix lists that the PSP re-release has sold 60,000 copies abroad as of November 2007. As of 2016, the Valkyrie Profile series has sold 2.2 million copies in total.

Valkyrie Profile was well received by critics, with an 81/100 rating at Metacritic. Japanese gaming publication Famitsu gave the game a 35 out of 40, including it in its top 120 scoring PlayStation games of all time in 2000. That same year, the magazine's staff voted the game number 30 on its top 100 PlayStation games of all time. In a 2006 reader's poll conducted by Famitsu, Valkyrie Profile was voted the 27th best video game of all time. A review by IGN also praised the game, noting the deep, if complicated, gameplay system, and heavily praising the writing, plot, and characterization. Due to the positive review scores and relative rarity of the game, used copies of Valkyrie Profile have sold for $300, which is more than its initial retail price.

Eric Bratcher for Next Generation gave it three stars out of five, and called it an ambitious game with a compelling combat system, great open-ended character customization, and a unique setting, but thought that it is more artistic than a modern, less management-oriented titles.

The PSP re-release, Valkyrie Profile: Lenneth, was also well received by critics, with an 80/100 rating at Metacritic. GameSpot gave the game a 7.5/10, citing that it was "a complex, ambitious, and gorgeous title" with "beautiful aesthetics, an entertaining battle system, engaging characters, and a creatively balanced 'dual' scenario", and that the graphics were "just about as good as...on the original" with the "fantastic music" being "one of the highlights of the game". They criticized the game for its "Draconian pacing", which made it a "nonlinear RPG that discourages exploration or even freedom of choice" and that the players will "rarely have time to enjoy the surrounding splendor", and also for its "very noticeable" load times and a manual that "doesn't provide much information" into its non-standard game mechanics. They also acknowledged that it "isn't exactly a great on-the-go game" due to its "lengthy story sequences, few save points, and steep learning curve" and the pre-rendered FMVs "look nice but don't bring much to the game". Lenneth received IGN's award for Best PSP RPG of 2006.
