= Valkyrie Profile 2: Silmeria =

2006 video game

- North American cover art
- Developer: tri-Ace
- Publisher: Square Enix
- Designer: Takayuki Suguro
- Composer: Motoi Sakuraba
- Series: Valkyrie Profile
- Platform: PlayStation 2
- Release: JP: June 22, 2006; NA: September 26, 2006; AU: September 6, 2007; EU: September 7, 2007
- Genre: Role-playing video game
- Modes: Single-player, multiplayer

Valkyrie Profile 2: Silmeria (Japanese: ヴァルキリープロファイル2 シルメリア) is the second installment of the Valkyrie Profile series, which was developed by tri-Ace and published by Square Enix. It was released for PlayStation 2 in 2006 in Japan and North America, and in 2007 in Australia and Europe. It went on to be re-released as a Square Enix "Ultimate Release".

Taking place hundreds of years before the original game, the story revolves around two characters living in the same body named Silmeria and Alicia. Together, the two characters work to stop a catastrophe that could cause war between the people and the gods. The game received generally positive reviews, citing its similarity to the original Valkyrie Profile game and its beautiful graphics, but had a convoluted interface and a high degree of difficulty.

== Gameplay ==
Valkyrie Profile 2: Silmeria is divided into chapters. Unlike its predecessor, players can spend as much time as they like exploring the towns and dungeons in the game.

Dungeon exploration is done in a 2D side scrolling platform manner. Characters traverse the environment in different ways. Alicia is the only character that can jump, swing a sword, and shoot photons. Photons can bounce off the ground and walls, temporarily freeze enemies and objects in crystal, and switch places with crystallized enemies; they are used to solve many puzzles. Alicia can also engage an enemy in battle by attacking them or by coming into contact with them. When attacking enemies, Alicia receives the first move in combat with a full attack point gauge. By coming into contact with an enemy, there is a chance that the player will be at a disadvantage and start with an empty attack point gauge.

Sealstones are items with special effects hidden atop daises and shells within dungeons. Sealstones on a daisy will affect enemies within that daisy's radius of influence, as well as expanding the range of Sealstones. If Alicia carries a Sealstone, it affects the whole party. Similarly, if an enemy possesses one, it will affect that enemy party, while not affecting any others. If placed in a shell, the Sealstone's effect is negated completely. Sealstones may also be restored at the cost of magic crystals at a spring. When a Sealstone is restored, the player may equip that Sealstone from any spring, rather than being returned to their original location once the player leaves the dungeon.

=== Combat system ===
Combat takes place in a real-time 3D battlefield using the Advanced Tactical Combination (ATC) battle system. Combat uses attack points (AP) which are needed to act in battle. Points are consumed by attacking and dashing, and are replenished by defeating enemies, by being attacked, by using the charge function, or by moving around as time passes. Time only flows when the player is moving which allows players to stop time and plan out where they will move next, and predict where enemy units may attack. Once an attack occurs, the screen zooms in on the party, allowing the player to coordinate their attack or defense. The party can also conduct a leader assault, in which destroying the enemy leader will cause the others to retreat, ending the battle quickly and earning bonus experience.

Characters have multiple attacks and can be assigned up to three of them for use in battle. Stringing attacks together adds to the heat gauge. When the heat gauge reaches 100% in one turn, characters can perform their soul crush special attack, which causes great damage and refills the heat gauge, possibly allowing another character to also use their soul crush. There is no charge time for soul crush, allowing characters to use it every turn so long as they charge the heat gauge up to 100% each time. This lack of charge time means that mages can attack every turn with magic as well, but can only be assigned one attack spell for the battle, though other spells can be accessed through the battle menu.

New to the game is the concept of breaking off enemy parts. Different attacks can hit different parts of enemies, and thus affect the amount of damage inflicted on the enemy. Once a part of an enemy has taken sufficient damage, it can break off. When an enemy part breaks off, the player may enter break mode, where the characters have unlimited AP for a short amount of time. Monster parts can be equipped as accessories or can be sold or used to craft weapons, armor, or other items. Breaking off enemy parts can also disable certain attacks that enemies perform using that specific part of their body that was broken off.

With a second controller, a second player can also control one or more party members in combat.

=== Equipment ===
Alicia buys equipment from shops using the game's currency, OTH. As the player buys more items from a specific shop, they will become a valued customer, unlocking special weapons and items, which require monster parts to make.

Four weapon types are present: light sword, heavy sword, bow, and staff, corresponding to the four types of characters: light warrior, heavy warrior, archer, and mage. Additional weapon types are acquired as the game progresses for selected characters obtained during the gameplay. Characters will only be able to equip their specific type of weapon (the exception being the angel slayer, which can be equipped by anyone) and only certain weapons allow them to perform their soul crush.

Most equipment comes with runes, and by equipping different combinations of runes, characters can learn certain skills during combat. Runes also have color links (Red, Blue, or Green); multiple pieces of equipment of the same color equipped simultaneously in the proper configuration can enhance each equipped piece's effects.

=== Einherjar ===
When Silmeria is present, Alicia can materialize her einherjar, and many of the playable characters are from Silmeria's previous time as a Valkyrie. Alicia must touch an artifact associated with an einherjar in order to have Silmeria re-materialize them. Placing certain combinations of einherjar in the party will result in conversations between them during random battles, such as having Celes and Phyress, who are sisters, in the same group. The einherjar found in dungeons are random; there are up to three different characters of the same class found in an artifact. Because of this, although there are 40 different einherjar in the game, only 20 can be recruited per game.

Once einherjar reach a certain level, the player may release them, returning them to the world of the living. Depending on the einherjar's attributes and equipment, they may leave different rewards for the player.

== Plot ==
=== Setting ===
There are two main settings in Valkyrie Profile 2: Silmeria: Midgard, the realm of mortal men, and Asgard, the realm of the Gods. Midgard is the world of men, a place stricken by war, famine, and disease, with the taint of death everywhere. Throughout history, the fate of Midgard has been influenced by the Gods on numerous occasions, but now the kingdom of Dipan is set upon resisting such divine interference.

Asgard is the world of the Æsir, ruled over by Odin, Lord of the Heavens. In Asgard lies the Hall of Valhalla, where the einherjar, the brave souls of the fallen, reside. The Æsir occasionally influence the course of history in Midgard in an effort to preserve the order of the universe.

Valkyrie Profile 2 takes place in an alternate timeline from the first game: in Valkyrie Profile, Silmeria was imprisoned within a crystal and taken by Brahms; here, Brahms is the one imprisoned within a crystal. Events that should have happened did not because of a certain character's interference with history.

=== Story ===
The game's story is independent of and not directly related to the first Valkyrie Profile and takes place hundreds of years before the first game. Valkyrie Profile 2: Silmeria is about two characters, Silmeria and Alicia, who are contained in the same body. Silmeria is one of the valkyries tasked with collecting the souls of brave warriors and delivering them to Valhalla. After she disobeyed Odin, he reincarnated her in the body of Alicia, the Princess of Dipan.

Silmeria was supposed to remain trapped, but she awakens in the body of the Princess, which makes many people think that Alicia is insane or possessed. The king imprisons her and announces her death, but unbeknownst to the public he sends her to live in a small palace outside the city of Crell Monferaigne. In the pre-game prolog, Odin sends the current valkyrie, Hrist, to take Silmeria's soul back to Valhalla. Escaping from Hrist, Alicia/Silmeria flee into the wilderness, where they try to evade capture and attempt to avert a catastrophe that could spark a war between the Gods and Midgard.

=== Chapter 1: Defiers of the Gods ===
The game begins in the port of Solde. Learning that the ferry is out of service, Alicia/Silmeria plans to enter Dipan through the secret Royal Underground Path. Seeing Rufus, a half-elf archer wearing a special ring, Alicia/Silmeria hires him to accompany them to Dipan, although Rufus has his own reasons for helping. As they journey through the underground ruins to Dipan, Alicia finds an old necklace and Silmeria calls forth Dylan, the most powerful of her former einherjar.

=== Chapter 2: Darkness in Dipan ===
Alicia/Silmeria, Rufus, and Dylan enter Dipan where Rufus decided to leave the party, Alicia requests him to stay, Rufus go on talking until he discovers that Silmeria is within Alicia silmeria switched with alicia and started introducing herself, Rufus looks on his ring and decided to stay with them. They sneak into the palace, finding demonic research and a mysterious machine before being discovered by the Three Mages of Dipan. They are almost captured but Lezard Valeth, the mages' new apprentice, helps them escape. Lezard informs them that King Barbarossa and The Three Mages have delved into dangerous research, including the Sovereign's Rite, demonic transformation, and time travel, and plan to use the Dragon Orb to create a new world, free of the gods' interference. Odin cannot allow this and is planning to destroy Dipan. Alicia/Silmeria, Rufus, and Dylan decide that getting the Dragon Orb themselves is the only way to stop Odin and save Dipan.

=== Chapter 3: Ulterior Motives ===
Alicia/Silmeria, Rufus, Dylan, and Lezard head to the Serdberg Mountain Ruins, the Dragon Orb's last known location. Searching the ruins, they meet Leone and Arngrim, two mercenaries who agree to help in exchange for any treasure they find. Silmeria recognizes that Leone is Hrist in disguise, but fearing a confrontation, does not expose her to the others. Discovering the Dragon Orb gone from the ruins, Silmeria uses her powers to follow its magical trail throughout Midgard. While searching Audoula Temple On The Lake, Rufus' ring is knocked off, causing him to go into convulsions before it is replaced. Rufus reveals why he is helping Silmeria: as the only other half-elf, Odin keeps him around in case of injury (the Ring of Mylinn he wears keeps him from aging) and should Odin ever transfer into Rufus' body, Rufus would cease to exist. Silmeria's rebellion provides an opportunity to escape his fate. The group eventually finds the Dragon Orb's final resting place in the Palace of the Venerated Dragon where Hrist reveals herself, escaping with Arngrim and the Dragon Orb.

=== Chapter 4: Wrath of the Gods ===
Hrist takes the Dragon Orb to Valhalla and Odin orders Dipan's destruction. Alicia/Silmeria, Rufus, Dylan, and Lezard return to Dipan but are too late to prevent Hrist from destroying the city and executing King Barbarossa. They confront Hrist and as Alicia/Silmeria and Hrist duel, the Three Mages cast the Sovereign's Rite, transmigrating Silmeria's and Hrist's souls from their bodies. Brahms reveals himself from within Dylan's body and stops them, at which point Freya appears and tries to apprehend him. This is where the timelines of Valkyrie Profile and Valkyrie Profile 2 diverge:

- In the original timeline, Silmeria, separated from Alicia's body, blocks Freya's spell, becoming crystallized herself. Brahms escaped with Silmeria, explaining why she was crystallized in his castle in Valkyrie Profile.
- In the altered timeline, Lezard, unknown to the others, casts his own spell and captures Silmeria. Without Silmeria's intervention, Freya crystallizes Brahms and returns with him and Hrist to Valhalla, though she cannot explain the strange distortion (from Lezard's spell) during the encounter nor why Silmeria vanished.

=== Chapter 5: The Invisible Hand ===
Alicia awakens to find Silmeria absent, Brahms and Lezard gone. She and Rufus decide to retrieve the Dragon Orb themselves. They journey through the Forest of Spirits, cross into Asgard, and climb to the top of Yggdrasil, where they confront Odin and Freya. Lezard reappears, and offers to aid Alicia in defeating Odin, but it is revealed that he only does this to obtain Odin's soul. Using Silmeria's captured soul, he casts a spell causing Odin to transmigrate, which also displaces Rufus' soul, before teleporting away with Odin's body and soul. Freya, unable to do anything, retreats. Alicia is able to use the Ring of Mylinn to rematerialize Rufus and restore him to his body.

Alicia and Rufus descend from Yggdrasil and head to Valhalla, where they meet Arngrim, who asks to accompany them in penance for his past actions. The three of them find the Dragon Orb and the crystallized Brahms, along with Hrist and Freya. Hrist wants their help rescuing Silmeria, but Freya refuses to negotiate with humans and attacks them. Fed up with the gods trying to kill her einherjar, Hrist stops Freya by using the Dragon Orb, transporting Alicia, Rufus, Arngrim, Brahms, and Hrist into Lezard Valeth's twisted world.

=== Chapter 6: The Twisted World Tree ===
Finding themselves on Lezard's twisted world tree, Brahms and Hrist agree to a truce when Lenneth arrives, having come from her future to stop Lezard who, using the machine in Dipan (a time machine), traveled back in time and changed history. Ascending the tree, they rescue Silmeria, whom Alicia rematerializes into Valkyrie form. Their reunion is short-lived, though, when Lezard reveals that his target all along has been Lenneth. Having absorbed Odin's soul and power, Lezard casts the Sovereign's Rite, transmigrating the three Valkyries, and takes Lenneth's soul. Without bodies, the Valkyries will fade away so Alicia rematerializes Hrist's and Silmeria's souls into crystals until Lenneth can be freed. Following Lezard into his fortress atop the tree, they fight Lezard and shatter Lenneth's crystal prison. The three Valkyries combine their souls, using Alicia's body to form a single true Valkyrie. The Valkyrie defeats Lezard, but he stabs her before he dies, causing Alicia's body and soul to dissipate. Rufus and Arngrim return to Midgard with the Dragon Orb but Brahms decides to stay and die as Lezard's world crumbles; it is the only place where he is mortal.

The three Valkyries' souls are shown separating again, the fates of Hrist and Silmeria are unknown while a new future awaits Lenneth she returns to her own timeline in the present. Years later, Rufus is traveling through Coriander Village when he sees a young girl resembling Alicia. A young Lezard is also shown sitting on a fence if Valkyrie is not used during the final battle.

== Characters ==
There are nine main characters in Valkyrie Profile 2: Alicia, Rufus, Dylan/Brahms, Lezard, Arngrim, Leone/Hrist, Lenneth, Silmeria, and Freya. Most of them join and leave the party, sometimes permanently, at different points throughout the game (Alicia, Rufus, and Brahms being the only characters not to leave for the rest of the game), while Freya is only playable once she is beaten in the optional Seraphic Gate:

- Alicia, Princess of Dipan, is the main protagonist of Valkyrie Profile 2 and mortal host for Silmeria's soul. Alicia, having heard Silmeria's voice her entire life and learned much of what Silmeria knows, is unusual for a Valkyrie's mortal host. Silmeria can take over Alicia's body when necessary but usually leaves Alicia in control and tells her what to do. Other characters can sometimes detect the change between Alicia and Silmeria by their voices and mannerisms. Many of Dipan's citizens believed Alicia was mad, which led her father, King Barbarossa, to exile her from the kingdom. It is revealed later in the game that he did so out of love and not malice.
- Hrist is the current valkyrie, and the old nemesis during Valkyrie Profile 2. She is fiercely loyal to Odin's commands, which include the punishment of Dipan for defying Odin. This puts her in conflict with Alicia who, despite being exiled, does not wish to see her home and family destroyed. She takes the guise of Leone, and ventures with Alicia, learning more about her and eventually becoming friends, which means that she does not wish to kill her anymore to release her sister inside.
- Lezard Valeth is a sorcerer with knowledge and magic skills far beyond his years. Initially engaged in research in Dipan's capital, he joins the adventurers' quest when he rescues Alicia and her party from a dangerous predicament. As revealed in Valkyrie Profile, Lezard harbors an obsession with the valkyrie Lenneth, Silmeria's sister. This is not the Lezard of the game's time period, but from an alternate future, the one seen in Valkyrie Profile: Lenneth. His involvement leads to the events in Valkyrie Profile: Silmeria, changing the timeline. Lezard is also the main villain in Valkyrie Profile 2.
- Lenneth herself is the valkyrie of Valkyrie Profile: Lenneth, the original Valkyrie Profile. She also appears near the game's finale and joins the party, having learned of Lezard's plot. As with Lezard, she appears as she does following the events of Valkyrie Profile: Lenneth, as the Lord of Creation.

== Development and release ==
The game's development and imminent release in 2006 for the PlayStation 2 was revealed to the public along with another entry for the PlayStation Portable titled Valkyrie Profile: Lenneth. The game was designed to have a similar battle system to the original Valkyrie Profile, but allow players to move their characters around during combat to create more strategy.

According to veteran tri-Ace producer, Yoshinori Yamagishi, tri-Ace had been always planning to make Valkyrie Profile 2: Silmeria ever since the completion of Valkyrie Profile in 1999 but titles like Star Ocean: Till the End of Time and Radiata Stories took their attention away from focusing on developing it.

The game's music is composed by Motoi Sakuraba of Star Ocean. It has two original soundtracks, Alicia and Silmeria. Each soundtrack is divided into two discs totaling 70 songs from the game. Prior to the release, a special artifact box was released which included a copy of the game, ten musical tracks, a keychain, and a figurine. In 2012, characters Rufus and Alicia were added to the Square Enix card game Lord of Vermillion Re: 2.

== Reception ==
Reception

Aggregate score
Aggregator	Score
Metacritic	84/100

Review scores
Publication	Score
1Up.com	B+
Famitsu	34/40
GameSpot	8.0/10
IGN	8.5/10

Valkyrie Profile 2: Silmeria was the top-selling game during the week of its release in Japan, selling 281,510 copies. It sold over 400,000 copies in Japan by the end of 2006.

The game was well received by critics, with an 84/100 rating at Metacritic. Famitsu scored the game a 34 out of 40. GameSpot gave it an 8.0/10, calling it a "refreshingly different and very challenging example of a Japanese RPG" that "looks great", with a "fun and exciting" combat system. They praised the game for its depth and variety but found the skills and equipment interface convoluted and noted that its high difficulty "hampers the pacing of the storyline". IGN was highly complimentary of the game, citing its beautiful graphics and 3D combat as standout features, while citing its characters and voiceovers as being less compelling than the original title. 1UP.com highly praised the game, calling out the exquisite attention to graphical detail in the games environments and the cut scenes, as well as calling the soundtrack "stellar".

The game received IGN's award for "Best Game No One Played" in 2006. Amazon Japan named it the third best game released in 2006. It also was made part of Sony Computer Entertainment's Ultimate Hits in March 2007.
