= Sakura Wars 3 =

2001 video game

Sakura Wars 3: Is Paris Burning?
- Dreamcast box art, featuring protagonist Erica Fontaine
- Developers: Red Company; Overworks (Note: Ported to the PlayStation 2 by H.I.C.)
- Publishers: JP: Sega; CN: Dysin Interactive
- Director: Akira Nishino
- Producer: Ryutaro Nonaka
- Designer: Toru Yoshida
- Programmer: Takayuki Kudo
- Artists: Hidenori Matsubara; Kōsuke Fujishima
- Writer: Satoru Akahori
- Composer: Kohei Tanaka
- Series: Sakura Wars
- Platforms: Dreamcast, Windows, PlayStation 2
- Release: Dreamcast: JP: March 22, 2001; Windows: JP: March 25, 2004; PlayStation 2: JP: February 24, 2005
- Genres: Tactical role-playing, dating sim, visual novel
- Mode: Single-player

Sakura Wars 3: Is Paris Burning? (Note: Japanese: サクラ大戦3 〜巴里は燃えているか〜, Hepburn: Sakura Taisen Surī: Pari wa Moeteiru ka) is a cross-genre video game developed by Red Company and Overworks and published by Sega for the Dreamcast. The third installment in the Sakura Wars series, it was released in March 2001. Defined by its publisher as a "dramatic adventure" game, Is Paris Burning? combines overlapping tactical role-playing, dating sim and visual novel gameplay elements.

Taking place after the events of Sakura Wars 2: Thou Shalt Not Die, Sakura Wars 3 follows protagonist Ichiro Ogami as he joins the newly formed Paris Combat Revue and trains the "Flower Division", an all-female unit dedicated to fighting supernatural threats against the city while working as a cabaret act. Alongside Ogami's training, the Paris Division must prevent Salu and the Paris Phantoms, the game's main antagonists, from threatening Paris.

The concept work for Sakura Wars 3 began during development of Thou Shalt Not Die. Most of the original staff returned, including series creator and general producer Oji Hiroi, writer Satoru Akahori, artists Kōsuke Fujishima and Hidenori Matsubara, and composer Kohei Tanaka. Newcomers included director Akira Nishino and executive producer Noriyoshi Ohba. While retaining the basic systems of the Sakura Wars series, the engine and gameplay were rebuilt for the Dreamcast, with a new battle system being designed. The anime cutscenes were produced by Production I.G, blending traditional animation with computer graphics. It received positive reviews from journalists and sold over 300,000 units. A direct sequel, Sakura Wars 4: Fall in Love, Maidens, was released in 2002.

== Gameplay ==
The two main gameplay modes of Sakura Wars are social interaction using the LIPS system (above), and turn-based strategic battles which is directly influenced by earlier LIPS interaction (below). Sakura Wars 3 implemented expanded "Analog LIPS" and a 3D combat system.

Sakura Wars 3: Is Paris Burning? is a cross-genre video game in which the player controls Ichiro Ogami and the all-female "Flower Division" of the Paris Combat Revue, who must defeat Salu and the Paris Phantoms before they threaten Paris. Dubbed a "dramatic adventure" game and taking place across 11 episodes, the gameplay segments incorporate tactical role-playing, dating sim and visual novel elements. Gameplay is divided between adventure segments where Ogami explores Montmartre, and combat sequences governed by a turn-based battle system across a three-dimensional (3D) area allowing full range of movement.

During the adventure segments, Ogami navigates Montmartre and the Paris Division's base at the club Le Chatte Noir starting from his apartment. During these sequences, when talking with both members of the Paris Division and supporting characters within the Paris Combat Revue, conversations rely on the traditional Live & Interactive Picture System (LIPS). When faced with critical choices in the course of a conversation, dialogue options are displayed with a time limit for the player to select a response. Depending on the type of response, the character may react positively or negatively, impacting their relationship and future interactions with Ogami. Other actions within LIPS include holding the cursor over parts of a character's portrait to trigger internal monologues and varying responses from the characters. The version used in Sakura Wars 3 is dubbed Analog LIPS; certain choices allow for use of the analog stick to adjust the intensity of a single answer, which can in turn elicit further variation from characters. An additional "dinner mode" has Ogami taking dinner with the other protagonists, with whom Ogami initiates a conversation with and how that conversation develops affecting later interactions. A version of this mode, dubbed "Elegant Day in Paris", is dedicated solely to navigation and LIPS-based interactions.

During combat segments, the Paris Division fights monsters in the streets of Paris using machines called Kobus. This game uses a real-time battle system called the Active & Realtime Machine System (ARMS), where each unit has a full range of movement, with their distance limited by an Action Point meter. They have their own turn, with each turn allowing two actions. These actions include "Attack", "Defend", "Move", "Deathblow" (a critical strike that kills an enemy in one hit), Charge (store energy for a more powerful action during the next turn), and Heal (which restores health points to a chosen unit). Different units specialize in different skills, such as support actions, melee attacks, or distance attacks—along with their range of movement, each unit also has an independent range in which they can perform actions. Actions taken during LIPS sequences with members of the Flower Division directly impact battles; skillful performances during LIPS segments raises a character's Trust, granting status increases and improving combat ability. LIPS interactions can also unlock Combination and Coalesce attacks, where two characters perform a joint attack to deal high damage to a single enemy. If certain conditions are not met or if Ogami's unit is destroyed, the game ends.

Minigames can be played during adventure segments, with each minigame being themed around one of the main characters; these include a top-down arcade-style shooter, a chess-style tactical game, score-based games where Ogami must hit targets, and a simulation where Ogami and another character pick locks within a time limit. A dedicated casino allows Ogami to play poker, blackjack, and on a slot machine. When in his apartment, Ogami can access a device called the Kimenotron, allowing audio communication with characters from earlier Sakura Wars games. A portable version of this called the Mobile Kimenotron is also available for players who connected the Dreamcast console's Visual Memory Unit, which relays text messages at random intervals.

== Synopsis ==
In 1926, Imperial Japanese Navy Lieutenant Ichiro Ogami arrives in Paris to train a new fighting unit established by the government to combat supernatural threats. Dubbed the "Paris Combat Revue" and modelled on Ogami's original group from Tokyo, the all-female group maintains its cover as a cabaret act at the nightclub Les Chatte Noir. Their main fighting unit is called the Paris Division, its members acting as both cabaret stars and magically-imbued warriors able to pilot mechas called Kobus. Its initial members are clumsy nun Erica Fontaine, and cold French noble Glycine Bleumer. In his efforts to build the group, Ogami helps recruit three more members—Coquelicot, a Vietnamese traveling circus performer; French-Japanese widow Hanabi Kitaoji; and Romanian master thief Lobelia Carlini.

As the Paris Division grows, Paris is attacked by a group of black magicians dubbed the Paris Phantoms, many of whom torment members of the unit in attempts to break them. The Paris Phantoms are revealed to be controlled by the clown Salu; the last of an ethnic group who communed with Paris' dead and were hunted to near-extinction, Salu intends to use the Great Oak Tree, a god-like being which guards Paris, to resurrect his people using Paris' population as sacrifices. Using their united spiritual power, the Paris Division are able to defeat Salu, restoring Paris and the Great Oak Tree.

Alongside these events, Ogami experiences Parisian city life and culture while training the group to function with the same ability as the Imperial Combat Revue's Flower Division alongside their roles as cabaret performers at Les Chatte Noir. During his interactions with each member, he has the option of pursuing a romance with them. The flow of events is broken slightly when the Flower Division arrives in Paris during summer holidays, and demonstrates their comradeship and unity to the Paris group during a dance competition. Following Salu's defeat, Ogami decides that the group is able to fend for itself and leaves for Tokyo. The final scenes alter depending on whether Ogami pursued a romance with a member of the Paris Division.

== Development ==
Concept work for Sakura Wars 3 began during the development of Sakura Wars 2: Thou Shalt Not Die, with the ending of the second game leading directly into the events of Sakura Wars 3. The game was produced by Red Company and Sega's Overworks division; Overworks was one of Sega's nine semi-autonomous studios when the company restructured its arcade and console development teams in 2000. Series creator Oji Hiroi returned as general producer, along with director Akira Nishino and series writer Satoru Akahori. Regular series character designers Hidenori Matsubara and Kōsuke Fujishima devised the visuals for the new characters, while mecha designs were handled by Mika Akitaka. Noriyoshi Ohba, who produced the last two games, was the executive producer. New staff members included producer Ryutaro Nonaka.

While the previous two titles had been developed for the Sega Saturn, the console was soon to be replaced by its successor, the Dreamcast. Due to the game being for a new platform, the engine and systems were rebuilt from scratch to take advantage of all the Dreamcast's planned features. The more comprehensive "Analog LIPS" system was born from the team's wish to add variety to Ogami's individual responses. The Kinematron communication device—first introduced in Thou Shalt Not Die—was redesigned to take advantage of the Dreamcast controller, in addition to playing a larger role in the story and potential romances by keeping Ogami in contact with the Flower Division in Tokyo. The team also aimed to reduce loading times between the adventure gameplay segments; the revamped system was dubbed "Seamless ADV".

So as to properly portray Paris in the 1920s, Hiroi and other staff traveled to Paris to research its culture and setting, consulted with French natives who could speak Japanese, and made reproductions of adverts from the 1920s. During the course of development, Hiroi estimated that around 80% of the early planning material went unused in the final game. Producing the cutscenes was an exhaustive process, requiring 200 different cuts, storyboards equivalent to a half-hour original video animation (OVA), and 4000 sheets of character movements. The cutscenes included a technique dubbed "Neo CGI", which blended 3D computer graphics with traditional 2D animation. The anime segments were directed by Shinji Takagi and produced by Production I.G, which had first worked on Thou Shalt Not Die.

A major theme of the game is talking with people, which was amplified through the use of Paris as a setting, as during the game's time period Japan had little contact with the outside world apart from its navy. The idea of moving the setting from Tokyo to Paris was suggested to Hiroi by Akahori. The premise drew from the short story "The Dancing Girl" by Mori Ōgai. The nightclub where the Paris Division were based was inspired by Le Chat Noir, one of the early venues of modern cabaret. Commenting on creating the game's character design drafts, Fujishima called the experience both exciting and difficult. An unusual addition to the cast was Lobelia, who was brought in on sufferance due to her power. The game's subtitle was taken from the title of a book of the same name by Larry Collins and Dominique Lapierre, which had been made into a 1966 movie. The phrase made reference to the instructions given by Adolf Hitler to Dietrich von Choltitz to destroy Paris before the Allies of World War II arrived.

=== Audio ===
The score of Sakura Wars 3: Is Paris Burning? was written by regular series composer Kohei Tanaka. Tanaka initially planned to write a remixed version of the recurring theme "Geki! Teikoku Kagekidan" with Parisian-sounding instruments for the opening. Instead, he was told to create an entirely new theme, "Mihata no Moto Ni", with the staff demanding it be better than the original. The song's lyrics were written by Hiroi and arranged by Takayuki Negishi. In contrast to the rock and jazz style of the original theme song, Tanaka made use of classical orchestra and choir elements. The two ending themes, "Hana no Paris" and "Mirai", was performed by the lead actresses Noriko Hidaka, Saeko Shimazu, Etsuko Kozakura, Kikuko Inoue and Yoshino Takamori. The game also featured an iteration of "Geki! Teikoku Kagekidan", known as "Geki! Teikoku Kagekidan III", performed by original cast members Chisa Yokoyama, Urara Takano, Michie Tomizawa, Kumiko Nishihara, Yuriko Fuchizaki, Mayumi Tanaka, Maya Okamoto and Kazue Ikura.

== Release ==
Sakura Wars 3 was announced in October 1999 as part of the "Sakura Project 2000" project, being announced alongside the first game's anime series adaptation, the OVA series Sakura Wars: The Radiant Gorgeous Blooming Cherry Blossoms, and Sakura Wars: The Movie. The game was released on March 22, 2001. To promote its Japanese release, Sega organised launch events in Tokyo and Osaka on March 22, 2001. In Akihabara, nearly 3,000 fans attended a promotional lottery event featuring series creator Oji Hiroi and several members of the game's voice cast. Retailers also experienced overnight queues, with hundreds of customers gathering before opening. The launch was accompanied by an all-night celebration at Sega's Ikebukuro GiGO amusement centre, featuring themed merchandise, karaoke and arcade attractions. Multiple downloadable audio dramas were released over the Dreamcast's SegaNet internet network between March 2 and December 14, 2001. Broadcasts ended on March 20, 2002.

Sega ported Sakura Wars 3 to Microsoft Windows personal computers (PC). It was released for Windows 98, Windows 2000, Windows ME and Windows XP on March 25, 2004. Due to the game's size, these versions were released on multiple CD-ROMs. A DVD-ROM version was released for Windows 2000, Windows XP and Windows Vista on January 25, 2007. The PC version was published in China by Dysin Interactive on July 23, 2003.

Sakura Wars 3 was ported for a second time by Sega for the PlayStation 2. While mostly identical to the Dreamcast original, gameplay was adjusted to fit the console's DualShock controller, Dreamcast-exclusive functions were reworked for the PlayStation 2 hardware, and all fifteen audio dramas were included behind a password system. The PlayStation 2 port was released on February 24, 2005. As with most of the Sakura Wars series, the game never saw a release in Western territories. Wider localization efforts were prevented due to Sega's uncertainty as to whether the game's blend of genres would find a profitable audience outside Japan.

== Reception ==
Reception

Review scores
Publication	Score
Famitsu	9/10, 8/10, 8/10, 9/10
RPGFan	92%
TechnologyTell	10/10

In its week of release, Sakura Wars 3 sold over 216,000 units, selling through over 70% of its initial shipments. It sold over 304,000 units in Japan by 2004, becoming the seventh best-selling Dreamcast title of all time in the region. The PlayStation 2 port sold over 51,500 units during 2005. In Hong Kong, Sakura Wars 3 topped the Dreamcast sales chart published by GamePlayers DC, ahead of Biohazard Code: Veronica Complete and Illbleed. It also ranked first in the magazine's separate Hong Kong reader-popularity chart. As of 2008, Sakura Wars 3 was ranked as the third best-selling title in the Sakura Wars series. Japanese magazine Famitsu had the game earn their "Gold" ranking in their weekly Hall of Fame.

Due to its Japanese exclusivity, some of the English-language reviews for Sakura Wars 3 were published years after the initial release. The RPGFan reviewer cited the redesigned battle system as their favorite part of the game, with praise going to the real-time action and strategic options. The character designs, music and voice acting were also praised. Their main criticism was against the story, which was called out as unoriginal. Jenni Lada, writing for TechnologyTell, gave praise to every aspect of the game from its graphics and story to gameplay and music, calling the game "a wonderful entry in the series".

== Legacy ==
Ogami's foreign travels portrayed in Sakura Wars 3 were intended to continue into the next entry, but due to the discontinuation of the Dreamcast, the concept was reworked and Sakura Wars 4: Fall in Love, Maidens released in 2002 as the culmination of the series on Sega consoles. The Paris Assault Group were later featured in the 2004 spin-off title Sakura Wars Story: Mysterious Paris for the PlayStation 2. The cast of Sakura Wars 3 was featured as characters in the 2008 dungeon crawler spin-off Dramatic Dungeon: Sakura Wars — Because You Were There for the Nintendo DS. The use of "Neo CGI" in Sakura Wars 3 would inspire its development staff to surpass it when developing the CANVAS engine of Valkyria Chronicles for the PlayStation 3.

Two OVA series were created based around the Paris Combat Revue. The first three-episode series, Sakura Wars: École de Paris, was released between March and August 2003. Produced by Radix Ace Entertainment and Overworks, with script by Kawasaki and music by Tanaka, the stories focused on the Paris Combat Revue and members of the Paris Division before and during the early events of Sakura Wars 3. The second three-episode series, Sakura Wars: Le Nouveau Paris, was released between October 2004 and March 2005. Again produced by Radix Ace Entertainment, the story focused on the Paris Division's exploits following the end of Sakura Wars 3. Funimation licensed École de Paris for a Western release, publishing it on DVD on July 5, 2005. The DVD included over 45 minutes of extra features alongside the complete OVA. Funimation also issued cease and desist orders to fan subtitle versions of Le Nouveau Paris alongside other titles later confirmed for Western release, but nothing further was announced.

In a Famitsu reader vote for the top 100 Japanese games of all time in 2006, Sakura Wars 3 was ranked in eighteenth place, being the second most popular in the series up to that point. In 2016, Sakura Wars 3 was voted as the third most memorable Dreamcast game in a later Famitsu reader poll. Erica Fontaine was later included as a playable character in the 2012 Nintendo 3DS crossover title Project X Zone and its 2015 sequel, representing Sakura Wars 3 alongside characters from the original Sakura Wars and the fifth game Sakura Wars: So Long, My Love.

== Notes and references ==
=== Bibliography ===
- Sega Staff (March 22, 2001). サクラ大戦3 〜巴里は燃えているか〜 マニュアル [Sakura Wars 3: Is Paris Burning? Manual] (in Japanese). Sega. HDR-0152.
