= Mayumi Tanaka =

Japanese actress (born 1955)

- 田中 真弓
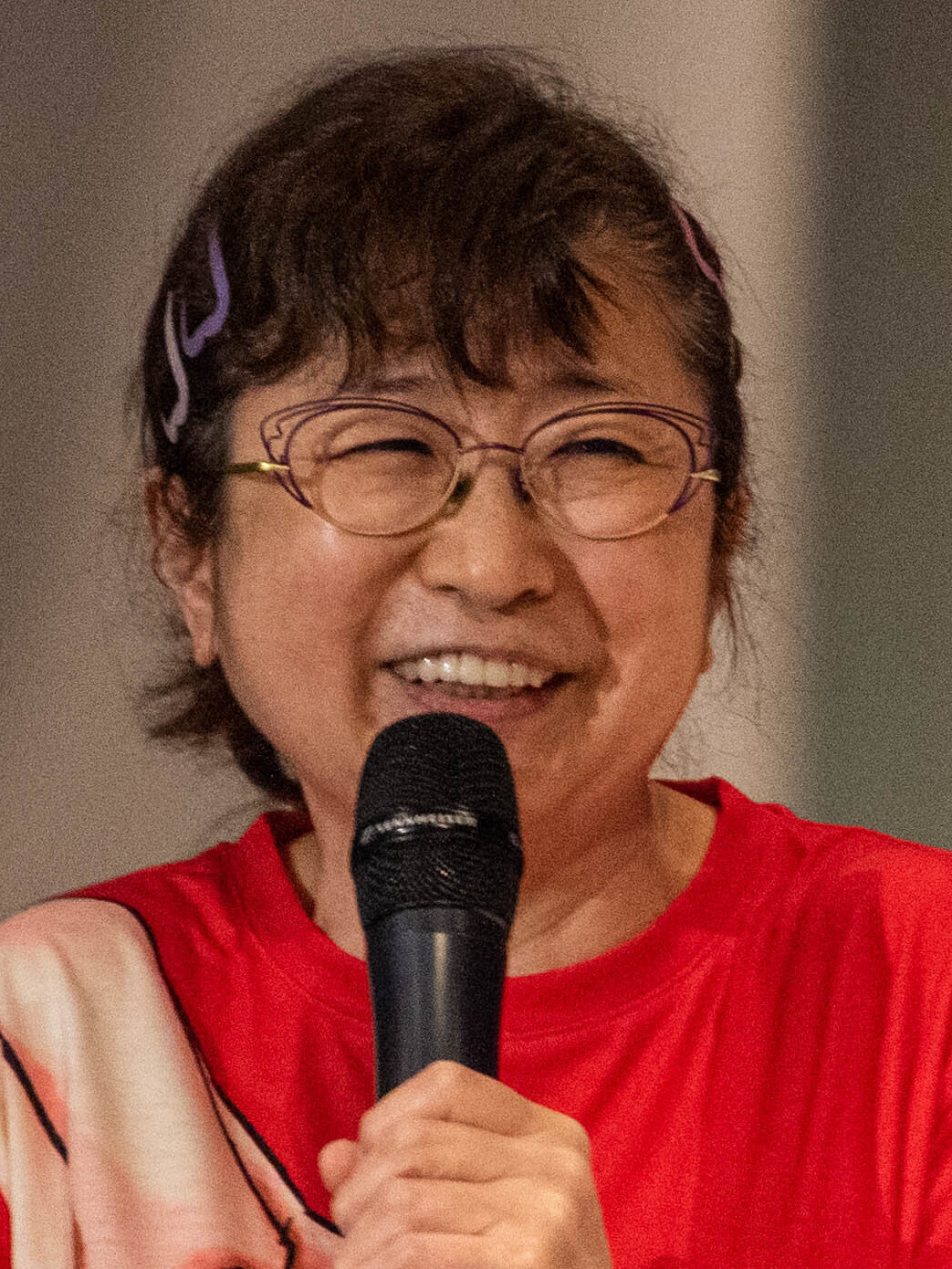
- Tanaka in 2023
- Born: January 15, 1955 (age 71); Tokyo, Japan
- Other name: Mayumi Abe (阿部 真弓)
- Occupations: Actress; voice actress; narrator
- Years active: 1978–present
- Agent: Aoni Production
- Spouse: Hiroyuki Shibamoto (divorced)
- Children: 1

Mayumi Tanaka (Japanese: 田中 真弓, Hepburn: Tanaka Mayumi; born January 15, 1955) is a Japanese actress, voice actress and narrator. She voices Monkey D. Luffy in One Piece, Krillin, Yajirobe and Uranai Baba in Dragon Ball, Ryunosuke Fujinami in Urusei Yatsura, Koenma in Yu Yu Hakusho; Pazu in Laputa: Castle in the Sky, Kirimaru Setsuno in Nintama Rantarō, Kanna Kirishima in the Sakura Wars series, the titular role of TwinBee in Konami's shoot-'em-up series TwinBee, and MegaMan Volnutt in the Mega Man Legends series and related Capcom crossovers. She received the Kazue Takahashi Award at the 5th Seiyu Awards.

== Filmography ==
=== Anime ===
Year	Title	Role	Notes	Source
1978	Gekiso! Ruben Kaiser	Ryoko Takagi	Debut role	
1979	Nobara no Julie	Heinrich		
1979–2005	Doraemon	Gariben		
1980	The Littl' Bits	Willibit		
1980	Astro Boy	Naoto, Takashi, Remo mm		
1981	Dr. Slump	Ryota		
1981	Dash Kappei	Kappei Sakamoto		
1981	Urusei Yatsura	Ryunosuke Fujinami		
1982	Two Down Full Base	Rokusuke Sato (Chibi Roku)		
1982	Sasuga no Sarutobi	Ninton		
1983	Mirai Keisatsu Urashiman	Jitanda Funda		
1983	Perman	Eji Magoichiro		
1983	Itadakiman	Kusaku Magota / Itadakiman		
1984	Gu Gu Ganmo	Tsukuda Hanpeita		
1984	Oyo Neko Bunyan	Chupa		
1984	Ranpo	Chutaro, Miyuki's brother		
1984	Giant Gorg	Yuu Tagami		
1984	Elves of the Forest	Mauri		
1984	Sherlock Hound	Poryi		
1985	Pro Golfer Saru	Kankuro, Dimple	TV series	
1985	Area 88	Satoru Kanzaki (young)	OVA ep. 2	
1985	Fire Tripper	Shuhe		
1986	Cool Cool Bye	Flene		
1986	Robotan	Kiiko		
1986—1987	Male Transfrom Female Mayumi Chan ja: 男変形女マユミちゃん	Taisuke Gou(Male),(Uncredited)	Hentai OVA	
1986	Uchūsen Sagittarius	Pitton		
1986–1989	Dragon Ball	Krillin, Yajirobe		
1986	Wonder Beat Scramble	Susumu Sugita		
1986	Ganbare, Kickers!	Oumi Nakajima		
1987	Esper Mami	Shin Okamura		
1987	Maps: Densetsu no Samayoeru Seijintach	Genji Tokoshima	OVA	
1987	The Three Musketeers Anime	Jean		
1988	Ulysses 31	Nono		
1988	Osomatsu-kun	Chibita	OVA	
1988	Mashin Hero Wataru	Wataru Ikusabe		
1988	Kaze no Matasaburo	Saburo Takada	OAV	
1989	Jushin Liger	Ken Taiga		
1989	Bye-Bye Liberty Crisis	Michael		
1989	Blue Blink	Chippi		
1989	Akuma-kun	Hiroshi		
1989-1996	Dragon Ball Z	Krillin, Yajirobe, Baba Uranai, Snow		
1989	Osamu Tezuka Story: I am Son Goku	Son Goku		
1989	The Laughing Salesman	Mitero Imani		
1990	Mashin Hero Wataru 2	Wataru Ikusabe		
1990	Gatapishi	Heita Hirano		
1990	Robin Hood	Much		
1991	Ore wa Chokkaku	Terumasa Hojo		
1991	Jankenman	Atchimuitehoihoi		
1991	Anime Himitsu no Hanazono	Dickon Sowerby (Dikon)		
1991	Marude Dameo	Boro		
1991–1992	3×3 Eyes	Mei Xing		
1991	Jungle Wars			
1992	Cooking Papa	Osamu		
1992	YuYu Hakusho	Koenma		
1992	Nangoku Shōnen Papuwa-kun	Papuwa		
1993	Nintama Rantaro	Kirimaru Settsuno (Kirimaru)		
1994	Tottemo! Luckyman	Luckyman / Yōichi Tsuitenai		
1995	Sailor Moon SuperS	Robert		
1995	Bonobono	Shō Nee-chan		
1995	The Pursuit of Harimao's Treasure	Neo Nachirida		
1995	Mojacko	Mojacko		
1996	Rurouni Kenshin	Yūtarō Tsukayama		
1996	Meiken Lassie	Lassie (Puppy era), Colin Jones		
1996	Dragon Ball GT	Krillin, Suho Goro		
1996	Shounen Santa no Daibouken!	Rato		
1997	Kero Kero Chime	Captain Hikaru		
1997	In the Beginning: The Bible Stories	Rocco		
1997	Kindaichi Case Files	Yayoi Muranishi		
1997–1998	Chūka Ichiban!	Liu Maoxing		
1997	Cho Mashin Hero Wataru	Wataru Ikusabe, Wataru Homurabe		
1997–1998	Sakura Wars: The Gorgeous Blooming Cherry Blossoms	Kanna Kirishima	OVA series	
1998	YAT Anshin! Uchuu Ryokou 2	John		
1999	Z-Mind	Umeno		
1999	Twinbee Paradise	Twinbee		
1999	Cyborg Kuro-chan	Fox		
1999	Guru Guru Town Hanamaru-kun	Shimao		
1999–present	One Piece	Monkey D. Luffy		
1999	Sakura Wars: The Radiant Gorgeous Blooming Cherry Blossoms	Kanna Kirishima	OVA series	
2000	Sakura Wars	Kanna Kirishima	TV series	
2000	Hello Kitty's Animation Theater	Uchikuchi	TV series	
2002	Hanada Shōnen Shi	Hisae Hanada		
2004	Black Jack	Taichi		
2004	Yakitate! Japan	Katsuo Umino, Yuko Motohashi		
2005	Majime ni Fumajime Kaiketsu Zorori	Meiko-san		
2005	Moeyo Ken	Nekomaru		
2005	Gaiking: Legend of Daiku-Maryu	Daiya Tsuwabuki		
2006	Hey! Spring of Trivia	Koji Genba no Kanban		
2006	Happy Lucky Bikkuriman	Tento otoko jack, Benzai Aki, Tenshidan Jack, Shintei Otoko Jack		
2006	Kekkaishi	Tokiko Yukimura, Gatcho, 10-sai no kiri		
2007	Master of Epic: The Animation Age	Elmony (male)		
2007	Gegege no Kitaro	Nurikabe Nyobo, Kemedama	5th series	
2007	Hatara Kizzu Maihamu Gumi	Yume, Mary		
2008	Porphy no Nagai Tabi	Guido		
2008	Negibouzu no Asatarou	Kabura no suzukichi		
2009	Slayers Evolution-R	Uppi		
2009–2010	Dragon Ball Z Kai	Krillin, Yajirobe		
2009	Gokujou!! Mecha Mote Iinchou	Yu Maehara		
2011	Toriko	Luffy, Krillin	Ep. 99	
2012	Space Brothers	Namba's mother		
2013	Dokidoki! PreCure	Ira		
2014	Dragon Ball Z Kai: Majin Boo edition	Krillin		
2014	Hero Bank	Boochokin		
2015	Dragon Ball Super	Krillin, Yajirobe		
2015	Ushio and Tora	Tokisaka		
2018	The Ancient Magus' Bride	Phyllis		
2018	Gegege no Kitaro	Sunakake-Babaa	6th series	
2021	Ore, Tsushima	Ojii-chan		
2024	The Foolish Angel Dances with the Devil	Chum		
2024	Dandadan	Turbo Granny		
2024	Dragon Ball Daima	Krillin		
2027	The One Piece	Monkey D. Luffy	ONA series	

=== Anime films ===
List of voice performances in feature films
Year	Title	Role	Notes	Source
1982	Tsushima Maru: Sayonara Okinawa	Sei		
1983	Ninja Hattori-kun NinxNin Furusato Daisakusen no Maki	Sarusuke Enhi		
1984	Urusei Yatsura: Beautiful Dreamer	Ryuunosuke Fujinami		
1984	Meitantei Holmes: Aoi Ruby no Maki / Kaitei no Zaihō no Maki	Polly, Detective Restaurant's daughter	Ruby chapter, Kaitei chapter	
1985	Gongitsune	Gon		
1985	Night on the Galactic Railroad	Giovanni		
1986	Pro Golfer Saru: Super Golf World e no Chōsen!!	Kankuro		
1986	Castle in the Sky	Pazu		
1987	Pro Golfer Saru: Kōga Hikyō! Kage no Ninpō Golfer Sanjō!	Karasu		
1987	Dragon Ball: Sleeping Princess in Devil's Castle	Krillin		
1988	Urusei Yatsura: The Final Chapter	Ryuunosuke Fujinami		
1988	Dragon Ball: Mystical Adventure	Krillin		
1989	ja:それいけ!アンパンマン キラキラ星の涙	Kozo Hinotama		
1989	Dragon Ball Z: Dead Zone	Krillin		
1990	Dragon Ball Z: The World's Strongest	Krillin		
1990	Doraemon: Nobita and the Animal Planet	Chippo		
1990	Dragon Ball Z: The Tree of Might	Krillin		
1990	ja:それいけ!アンパンマン ばいきんまんの逆襲	Kozo Hinotama		
1991	Dragon Ball Z: Lord Slug	Krillin, Yajirobe		
1991	Dragon Ball Z: Cooler's Revenge	Krillin, Yajirobe		
1991	Urusei Yatsura: Always, My Darling	Ryuunosuke Fujinami		
1992	Dragon Ball Z: The Return of Cooler	Krillin, Yajirobe		
1992	Dragon Ball Z: Super Android 13!	Krillin		
1993	Dragon Ball Z: Broly – The Legendary Super Saiyan	Krillin		
1993	Kappa no Sanpei ja:河童の三平	Kawara Sanpei		
1993	Yu Yu Hakusho: The Movie	Koenma		
1993	Dragon Ball Z: Bojack Unbound	Krillin		
1993	Bonobono	Sho nee-chan		
1994	Dragon Ball Z: Broly – Second Coming	Krillin		
1994	Yu Yu Hakusho the Movie: Poltergeist Report	Koenma		
1994	Dragon Ball Z: Bio-Broly	Krillin		
1995	Dragon Ball Z: Wrath of the Dragon	Krillin		
1996	Nintama Rantaro	Kirimaru Settsuno		
2000	One Piece: The Movie	Monkey D. Luffy		
2001	Clockwork Island Adventure	Monkey D. Luffy	Also Django's Dance Carnival short	
2001	Pikachu's PikaBoo	Yogirasu/Larvitar	short film	
2001	Sakura Wars: The Movie	Kanna Kirishima		
2002	Chopper's Kingdom on the Island of Strange Animals	Monkey D. Luffy	Also Dream Soccer King short	
2003	One Piece The Movie: Dead End no Bōken	Monkey D. Luffy		
2004	One Piece: The Cursed Holy Sword	Monkey D. Luffy		
2005	Baron Omatsuri and the Secret Island	Monkey D. Luffy		
2006	Giant Mecha Soldier of Karakuri Castle	Monkey D. Luffy		
2007	One Piece Movie: The Desert Princess and the Pirates: Adventures in Alabasta	Monkey D. Luffy		
2007	The Perfect World of Kai	Yukie Shiraishi		
2008	Episode of Chopper Plus: Bloom in the Winter, Miracle Cherry Blossom	Monkey D. Luffy		
2008	Dragon Ball: Yo! Son Goku and His Friends Return!!	Krillin, Yajirobe	short film	
2008	Gegege no Kitarō: Nihon Bakuretsu!!	Nurikabe Nyobo		
2009	One Piece Film: Strong World	Monkey D. Luffy		
2011	Gekijō-ban Anime Nintama Rantarō Ninjutsu Gakuen Zenin Shutsudō! no Dan	Kirimaru Settsuno		
2011	Straw Hat Chase	Monkey D. Luffy		
2011	Kami Voice: The Voice Makes a Miracle	Mr. Tanaka		
2012	One Piece Film: Z	Monkey D. Luffy		
2013	Dragon Ball Z: Battle of Gods	Krillin		
2014	Space Brothers: Number Zero	Nanba mother		
2015	Dragon Ball Z: Resurrection 'F'	Krillin		
2016	One Piece Film: Gold	Monkey D. Luffy		
2019	One Piece: Stampede	Monkey D. Luffy		
2022	Dragon Ball Super: Super Hero	Krillin, Yajirobe		
2022	One Piece Film: Red	Monkey D. Luffy		
2024	Nintama Rantarō: Invincible Master of the Dokutake Ninja	Kirimaru Settsuno		
2025	The Rose of Versailles	Maron Glacé Mont Blan		
2025	Me & Roboco	Roboco		

=== Video games ===
List of voice performances in video games
Year	Title	Role	Notes	Source
1993	YuYu Hakusho Yamishoubu!! Ankoku Bujutsukai	Koenma		
1994	Dragon Ball Z: Buyū Retsuden	Krillin		
1994	Dragon Ball Z: Idainaru Son Goku Densetsu	Krillin		
1994	TwinBee Taisen Puzzle Dama	Twinbee	PS1/PS2	
1994	Alnam no Kiba: Juuzoku Juuni Shinto Densetsu ja:アルナムの牙 獣族十二神徒伝説	Hien		
1994	YuYu Hakusho	Koenma		
1995	Princess Maker 2	Cube	PC Engine, Sega Saturn	
1995	Dragon Ball Z: Ultimate Battle 22	Krillin	PS1/PS2	
1995	Dragon Ball Z: Shin Butōden	Krillin	Sega Saturn	
1996	Dragon Ball Z: Idainaru Dragon Ball Densetsu	Krillin		
1996	Sakura Taisen	Kanna Kirishima	Sega Saturn	
1997	Odo Odo Oddity おどおどおっでぃ	Gikugiku	PS1/PS2	
1997	My Dream: On Air ga matenakute	Izumi Watanabe, Aya Takai		
1997	ja:桃太郎道中記	Tottemo Kokarun, Shoakuma	Sega Saturn	
1997	Rockman DASH	Rock Volnutt	PS1/PS2	
1997	Arunamu no Tsubasa ja:アルナムの翼 焼塵の空の彼方へ	Hien	PlayStation	
1997	Sakura Taisen: Hanagumi Taisen Columns	Kanna Kirishima	Arcade, Sega Saturn	
1998	Time Bokan Series: Bokan Desuyo ボカンですよ	Itadakiman	PS1/PS2	
1998	TwinBee RPG	Twinbee	PS1/PS2	
1998	Sakura Taisen 2: Kimi Shinitamou koto Nakare	Kanna Kirishima	Sega Saturn	
1998	Sokaigi	Mizumi	PS1/PS2	
1998	Kasei Monogatari ja:火星物語	Safi	PS1/PS2	
1998	Jade Cocoon: Story of the Tamamayu	Rui	PS1/PS2	
1998	Sakura Taisen: Teigeki Graph	Kanna Kirishima	Sega Saturn	
1999	Circadia ja:サーカディア	Ryota Hosaka	PS1/PS2	
2000	Rockman DASH 2	Rock Volnutt	PS1/PS2	
2000	'Favorite Dear ja:フェイバリットディア 純白の預言者	Ion Azubado	PS1/PS2	
2001	Time Bokan series: Bokan GoGoGo ボカンGoGoGo	Itadakiman	PS1/PS2	
2001	Sakura Taisen 3: Pari wa Moeteiru ka	Kanna Kirishima	Dreamcast	
2002	Sakura Taisen 4: Koi Seyo, Otome	Kanna Kirishima	Dreamcast	
2002	Moeyo Ken	Nekomaru	PS2	
2003	DreamMix TV World Fighters	Twinbee	GameCube, PS2	
2003	Dragon Ball Z: Budokai	Krillin, Yajirobe	PS2	
2003	Sakura Taisen: Atsuki Chishio ni	Kanna Kirishima	PS1/PS2, remake of original Sakura Taisen game	
2003	Sunrise World War	Yuu Tagami, Wataru Ikusabe	PS2	
2004	Dragon Ball Z: Budokai 2	Krillin	PS2	
2005	Dragon Ball Z: Budokai 3	Krillin	PS2	
2005	YuYu Hakusho: Forever	Koenma	PS2	
2005	Namco x Capcom	Zouna, Rock Volnutt	PS1/PS2	
2005	Dragon Ball Z: Budokai Tenkaichi	Krillin	PS2	
2006	Super Dragon Ball Z	Krillin	PS2	
2006	Brave Story: New Traveler	Shujinko	PSP	
2006	Dragon Ball Z: Budokai Tenkaichi 2	Krillin, Yajirobe		
2007	The Battle of Yu Yu Hakusho: Shitou! Ankoku Bujutsukai	Koenma	PS2	
2007	Crayon Shin-Chan DS: Arashi wo Yobu Nutte Crayoon Daisakusen!	Tabu	DS	
2007	Dragon Ball Z: Budokai Tenkaichi 3	Krillin, Yajirobe, Snow		
2008	Dragon Ball Z: Burst Limit	Krillin		
2008	Pro Golfer Saru	Kankuro, Dimple	Wii	
2008	Dragon Ball Z: Infinite World	Krillin	PS2	
2008	Tatsunoko vs. Capcom: Cross Generation of Heroes	Rock Volnutt	Arcade	
2009	Sekai de tatta hitori no ko 世界でたったひとりの子	Charlie, Babyface Chester	Radio	
2009	Boku no Natsuyasumi 4	Taiyo (Shima Nami Taiyo)	PSP	
2009	Dragon Ball: Revenge of King Piccolo	Krillin, Yajirobe	Wii	
2009	Item Getter: Bokura no Kagaku to Mahou no Kankei アイテムゲッター ～僕らの科学と魔法の関係～	Pike Boajiru	DS	
2009	Super Robot Wars NEO	Ken Taiga	Wii	
2009	Dragon Ball: Raging Blast	Krillin	PS3, Xbox 360	
2010	Tatsunoko vs. Capcom: Ultimate All-Stars	Rock Volnutt	Wii	
2010	Nintama Rantarō: Gakunen Taikousen Puzzle! no Dan	Kirimaru	DS	
2010	Dragon Ball: Raging Blast 2	Krillin	PS3, Xbox 360	
2011	Dragon Ball Z: Ultimate Tenkaichi	Krillin	PS3, Xbox 360	
2012	One Piece: Pirate Warriors	Monkey D. Luffy	PS3	
2013	One Piece: Pirate Warriors 2	Monkey D. Luffy	PS3, PSVita	
2013	Super Robot Wars Operation Extend	Ken Taiga	PSP	
2013	One Piece: Unlimited World Red	Monkey D. Luffy	PC, PS4, PS3, PSVita, 3DS, Switch & Wii U	
2013	Kodomo ni Anshin site Ataerareru Game Series Sekai Meisaku Douwa Oyako de Yomeru Game Ehon Bouken-hen	reading Sindbad	N3DS	
2014	J-Stars Victory VS	Monkey D. Luffy	PS3, PS4 & PSVita	
2014	Hero Bank 2	Buchokkin	DS	
2015	One Piece: Pirate Warriors 3	Monkey D. Luffy	PC, PS3, PS4 & PSVita	
2015	Super Robot Wars BX	Yuu Tagami	3DS	
2016	One Piece: Burning Blood	Monkey D. Luffy	PC, PS4, PSVita & Xbox One	
2018	Super Robot Wars X	Wataru Ikusabe	PC, PS4, PSVita, & Switch	
2019	One Piece: World Seeker	Monkey D. Luffy	PC, PS4 & Xbox One	
2020	Dragon Ball Z: Kakarot	Krillin	PC, PS4 & Xbox One	
2020	One Piece: Pirate Warriors 4	Monkey D. Luffy	PC, PS4, Xbox One and Switch	
2023	One Piece Odyssey	Monkey D. Luffy	PC, PS4, PS5, Xbox One and Xbox Series X/S	
2024	Dragon Ball: Sparking! Zero	Krillin	PC, PS5 and Xbox Series X/S	

=== Live-action ===
List of acting performances in feature films and television
Year	Title	Role	Type	Notes	Source
1992	Talking Head	Shijimi	Film		
2008	Kabei: Our Mother		Film		
2011	Kami Voice	Tanaka-san	Film		
2019	Natsuzora: Natsu's Sky	Ushiwakamaru (voice), Murakawa	TV	Asadora	
2023	The One I Long to See	Yasuyo Tabata	Film		
2024	The Tiger and Her Wings	Ine	TV	Asadora	
2026	Brothers in Arms	Old woman	TV	Taiga drama	

=== Audio dramas ===
List of voice performances in audio dramas
Title	Role	Notes	Source
CD Theater Dragon Quest IV Volume 1	Hoimin	Drama CD	
CD Theater Dragon Quest IV Volume 3	Hoimin	Drama CD	
Ishimatsu, ijin to au 石松、異人と会う	Foreigner	Radio	
Itazura na Kiss	Yuki Irie	Drama CD	
Sakura Wars series	Kanna Kirishima	Drama CD	
Super Radical Gag Family	Osawa Giko Tetsu	Drama CD	
Twinbee Paradise	Twinbee	Drama CD	
Twinbee Paradise: Ao to Hai Iro no Sora de	Child	Drama CD	

=== Dubbing roles ===
List of voice performances in overseas dubbing (Live-action)
Title	Role	Dub voice for	Notes	Source
Dutch	Doyle Standish	Ethan Embry		
Killing Eve	Dasha Duzran	Harriet Walter		
One Piece	Monkey D. Luffy	Iñaki Godoy		
Painted Faces	Child Cheng Lung	Siu Ming-fui		

List of voice performances in overseas dubbing (Animation)
Title	Role	Notes	Source
Help! I'm a Fish	Fly		
Minions: The Rise of Gru	Nunchuck		
Sing	Miss Crawly		
Sing 2	Miss Crawly		

== Awards ==
Year	Award	Category	Result	Ref.
1986	9th Anime Grand Prix	Voice actress of the Year	Won	
2011	5th Seiyu Awards	Kazue Takahashi Memorial Award	Won	
2013	7th Seiyu Awards	Kids Family Award	Won	
2026	20th Seiyu Awards	Best Actors in Supporting Roles	Won	
