= Sakura Wars (disambiguation) =

Sakura Wars is a Japanese media franchise of tactical role-playing video games.

Sakura Wars may also refer to:

- Sakura Wars (1996 video game), the first game in the series
- Sakura Wars (2019 video game), the sixth game in the series and a soft reboot
- Sakura Wars: The Movie, a movie based on the series
- Sakura Wars (TV series), 2000 anime
- Sakura Wars the Animation, 2020 anime
