= List of Sakura Wars media =

Sakura Wars is a video game series developed and published by Sega. Its first game premiered in Japan in 1996 and Sakura Wars games have later been on nearly every video game console since the Sega Saturn, including Dreamcast, Sega Titan, Game Boy Color, PlayStation Portable, Microsoft Windows, Wii, PlayStation 2, Nintendo DS, PlayStation 4 and several models of mobile phone.

In addition to the six games released as part of the main series and their many spin-offs and related titles, the Sakura Wars series has spawned many works in other media including anime, movies, novels and manga, and radio dramas. For the Sakura Taisen World Project, seven games were announced: Sakura Taisen: Atsuki Chishio ni, Sakura Taisen V: Saraba itoshiki hito yo, Sakura Taisen V: Episode 0, Sakura Taisen Monogatari - Teito-hen & Paris-hen, a title that tells the story of the Anti-Kouma Battle Squadron and the Kouma War. Also announced was a game that took place during the Sengoku Jidai and a PC port of Is Paris Burning.

== Video games ==
=== Main series ===
Game	Details
Sakura Wars Original release date: JP: September 27, 1996	Release years by system: 1996 – Sega Saturn; 2000 – Dreamcast, Microsoft Windows; 2003 – PlayStation 2 (remake titled Sakura Taisen ~Atsuki Chishio ni~); 2006 – PlayStation Portable
Sakura Wars Original release date: JP: September 27, 1996	Notes: PlayStation 2 remake subtitle translates to In Hot Blood, and is part of the Sakura Taisen World Project; Included in Sakura Wars Complete Box (Dreamcast, 2002), Sakura Wars 1 & 2 (PlayStation Portable, 2006), and Sakura Taisen Premium Edition (Windows PC, 2006)
Sakura Wars 2: Thou Shalt Not Die Original release date: JP: April 4, 1998	Release years by system: 1998 – Sega Saturn; 2000 – Dreamcast; 2001 – Microsoft Windows; 2006 – PlayStation Portable
Sakura Wars 2: Thou Shalt Not Die Original release date: JP: April 4, 1998	Notes: Sequel to Sakura Wars; Included in Sakura Wars Complete Box (Dreamcast, 2002), Sakura Wars 1 & 2 (PlayStation Portable, 2006), and Sakura Taisen Premium Edition (Windows PC, 2006); Sold over 500,000 units during its first few months
Sakura Wars 3: Is Paris Burning? Original release date: JP: March 22, 2001	Release years by system: 2001 – Dreamcast; 2004 – Microsoft Windows; 2005 – PlayStation 2
Sakura Wars 3: Is Paris Burning? Original release date: JP: March 22, 2001	Notes: Sequel to Sakura Wars 2: Thou Shalt Not Die; Microsoft Windows port part of the Sakura Taisen World Project; Included in Sakura Wars Complete Box (Dreamcast, 2002) and Sakura Taisen Premium Edition (Windows PC, 2006)
Sakura Wars 4: Fall in Love, Maidens Original release date: JP: March 21, 2002	Release years by system: 2002 – Dreamcast; 2005 – Microsoft Windows
Sakura Wars 4: Fall in Love, Maidens Original release date: JP: March 21, 2002	Notes: Sequel to Sakura Wars 3: Is Paris Burning?; Included in Sakura Wars Complete Box (Dreamcast, 2002) and Sakura Taisen Premium Edition (Windows PC, 2006)
Sakura Wars: So Long, My Love Original release date(s): JP: July 7, 2005; NA: March 30, 2010; EU: April 9, 2010	Release years by system: 2005 – PlayStation 2; 2010 – Wii
Sakura Wars: So Long, My Love Original release date(s): JP: July 7, 2005; NA: March 30, 2010; EU: April 9, 2010	Notes: Part of the Sakura Taisen World Project; First mainline Sakura Wars game to be officially released in North America and PAL regions.
Shin Sakura Wars Original release date(s): JP/AS: December 12, 2019; WW: April 28, 2020	Release years by system: 2019 – PlayStation 4
Shin Sakura Wars Original release date(s): JP/AS: December 12, 2019; WW: April 28, 2020	Notes: Soft reboot of the series set 12 years after So Long, My Love.

=== Prequels and side stories ===
Hanagumi Taisen Columns Original release date: March 28, 1997	1997: Sega Saturn; 1997: Sega Titan
Hanagumi Taisen Columns Original release date: March 28, 1997	Notes: Falling-blocks puzzle video game; Takes place during Sakura Taisen, featuring the original Imperial Combat Revue cast.
Hanagumi Taisen Columns 2 Original release date: January 6, 2000	2000: Dreamcast
Hanagumi Taisen Columns 2 Original release date: January 6, 2000	Notes: Falling-blocks puzzle video game; Takes place during Sakura Taisen 2, featuring the Imperial Combat Revue cast.
Sakura Taisen GB ~Geki • Hanagumi Nyuutai!~ Original release date: July 28, 2000	2000: Game Boy Color
Sakura Taisen GB ~Geki • Hanagumi Nyuutai!~ Original release date: July 28, 2000	Notes: Takes place during Sakura Taisen, featuring the original Imperial Combat Revue cast.; Subtitle roughly translates to Go Forth—Flower Division Enlist!; Published by Media Factory instead of Sega
Sakura Taisen GB2 ~Thunder Bolt Sakusen~ Original release date: December 6, 2001	2001: Game Boy Color
Sakura Taisen GB2 ~Thunder Bolt Sakusen~ Original release date: December 6, 2001	Notes: Takes place in 1925 during Sakura Taisen 2, featuring the Imperial Combat Revue cast.; Subtitle roughly translates to Operation Thunder Bolt
Sakura Taisen Monogatari ~Mysterious Paris~ Original release date: March 18, 2004	2004: PlayStation 2
Sakura Taisen Monogatari ~Mysterious Paris~ Original release date: March 18, 2004	Notes: Takes place between Sakura Taisen 3 and Sakura Taisen 4, featuring the Paris Combat Revue cast; Title translates to Sakura Wars Story ~Mysterious Paris~; Part of the Sakura Taisen World Project
Sakura Taisen V Episode 0 ~Kouya no Samurai Musume~ Original release date: September 22, 2004	2004: PlayStation 2
Sakura Taisen V Episode 0 ~Kouya no Samurai Musume~ Original release date: September 22, 2004	Notes: Prequel to Sakura Taisen V; Subtitle literally translates to The Samurai Girl from the Wild though it might be interpreted to mean The Samurai Girl from the Wild West; Shares its subtitle as the title of the play Gemini Sunrise and Diana Caprice write in Sakura Taisen V resulting in a cyclical connection; Part of the Sakura Taisen World Project
Dramatic Dungeon Sakura Taisen ~Kimi aru ga tame~ Original release date: March 19, 2008	2008: Nintendo DS
Dramatic Dungeon Sakura Taisen ~Kimi aru ga tame~ Original release date: March 19, 2008	Notes: Roguelike game featuring the Imperial, Paris and New York Combat Revues exploring randomly generated dungeons; Takes place after the five mainline Sakura Taisen games; Subtitle roughly translates to "Because you are here"

=== Compilations and collections ===
Game	Details
Sakura Wars Complete Box Original release date: JP: March 21, 2002	Release years by system: 2002 – Dreamcast
Sakura Wars Complete Box Original release date: JP: March 21, 2002	Notes: Bundle release of Sakura Wars, Sakura Wars 2: Thou Shalt Not Die, Sakura Wars 3: Is Paris Burning?, and Sakura Wars 4: Fall in Love, Maidens in 10 GD-ROMs
Sakura Wars 1 & 2 Original release date: JP: March 9, 2006	Release years by system: 2006 – PlayStation Portable
Sakura Wars 1 & 2 Original release date: JP: March 9, 2006	Notes: Bundle release of the Dreamcast ports of Sakura Wars and Sakura Wars 2: Thou Shalt Not Die in one UMD.
Sakura Wars Premium Edition Original release date: JP: September 21, 2006	Release years by system: 2006 – Windows
Sakura Wars Premium Edition Original release date: JP: September 21, 2006	Notes: Bundle release of the PC ports of Sakura Wars, Sakura Wars 2: Thou Shalt Not Die, Sakura Wars 3: Is Paris Burning?, and Sakura Wars 4: Fall in Love, Maidens.

=== Spin-offs ===
Game	Details
Sakura Taisen Hanagumi Tsuushin Original release date: JP: February 14, 1997	Release years by system: 1997 – Sega Saturn
Sakura Taisen Hanagumi Tsuushin Original release date: JP: February 14, 1997	Notes: Title translates to Sakura Wars Flower Division Communication
Sakura Taisen Jouki Radio Show Original release date: JP: November 13, 1997	Release years by system: 1997 – Sega Saturn
Sakura Taisen Jouki Radio Show Original release date: JP: November 13, 1997	Notes: Title translates to Sakura Wars Steam Radio Show
Sakura Taisen Teigeki Graph Original release date: JP: December 23, 1998	Release years by system: 1998 – Sega Saturn
Ogami Ichiro Funtouki ~Sakura Taisen Kayou Show "Benitokage" Yori~ Original release date: JP: February 24, 2000	Release years by system: 2000 – Dreamcast
Ogami Ichiro Funtouki ~Sakura Taisen Kayou Show "Benitokage" Yori~ Original release date: JP: February 24, 2000	Notes: Title roughly translates to Ichiro Ogami Exertion Chronicles ~Sakura Wars Musical Show "Crimson Lizard"~
Sakura Taisen Kinematron Hanagumi Mail Original release date: JP: December 28, 2000	Release years by system: 2000 – Dreamcast
Sakura Taisen Kinematron Hanagumi Mail Original release date: JP: December 28, 2000	Notes: Title translates to Sakura Taisen Kinematron Flower Division Mail
Sakura Taisen Online ~Teito no Nagai Hibi~ Original release date: JP: December 20, 2001	Release years by system: 2001 – Dreamcast
Sakura Taisen Online ~Teito no Nagai Hibi~ Original release date: JP: December 20, 2001	Notes: Subtitle roughly translates to Imperial Tokyo's Long Days; Terminated on November 30, 2005.
Sakura Taisen Online ~Pari no Yuuka na Hibi~ Original release date: JP: December 20, 2001	Release years by system: 2001 – Dreamcast
Sakura Taisen Online ~Pari no Yuuka na Hibi~ Original release date: JP: December 20, 2001	Notes: Subtitle roughly translates to Paris' Elegant Days; Terminated on November 30, 2005.
Jissen Pachinko Hisshouhou! CR Sakura Taisen Original release date: JP: September 13, 2007	Release years by system: 2007 – PlayStation 2
Jissen Pachinko Hisshouhou! CR Sakura Taisen Original release date: JP: September 13, 2007	Notes: Subtitle roughly translates to Definite Pachinko Battle Victory! CR Sakura Wars

== Film and television ==
Title	Original release date		
Title	Japan	North America	PAL region
Sakura Wars: The Gorgeous Blooming Cherry Blossoms	December 18, 1997	April 27, 1999	April 27, 1999
Notes: Four-part original video animation (OVA) produced by Radix and Animate Film; First three parts serve as a prequel to Sakura Wars depicting the formation of the Imperial Combat Revue, leading directly to the events of the game.; Fourth part takes place during the middle of the game.; Released in North America as Sakura Wars by ADV Films, and included in the Sakura Wars OVA Collection DVD box.; First piece of Sakura Wars media officially released in North America.
Sakura Wars: The Radiant Gorgeous Blooming Cherry Blossoms	December 18, 1999	October 8, 2002	October 8, 2002
Notes: Six character study episodes about the Imperial Combat Revue produced by Radix and Animate Film, taking place during Sakura Wars and Thou Shalt Not Die
Sakura Wars	April 8, 2000	May 27, 2003	May 27, 2003
Notes: 25 episode animated television series by Madhouse featuring concepts and themes from the first Sakura Wars game.
Sakura Wars: The Movie	December 22, 2001	September 9, 2003	none
Notes: Feature-length, theatrically released film by Production I.G set between Is Paris Burning? and Fall in Love, Maidens.
Sakura Wars: The Animation	April 3, 2020	April 3, 2020	April 3, 2020
Notes: 12 episode animated television series by Sanzigen serving as a sequel to Sakura Wars (2019).

== Soundtracks ==
The composer of the series is Kohei Tanaka. In addition to the original soundtracks, listed below, many games have inspired orchestral or vocal albums as well as compilation albums featuring music from several Sakura Wars games.

Title	Original release date		
Title	Japan	North America	PAL region
Sakura Wars Soundtrack: Steam Gramophone	May 2, 1997	none	none
Notes: Two CD set (1:35:55) with 51 tracks; Released in Japan by Lipop Record / BMG Japan
Sakura Wars 2: Steam Gramophone	July 17, 1998	none	none
Notes: Two CD set (2:20:13) with 60 tracks; Released by Marvelous Entertainment
Sakura Wars 3 Music Collection: Paris Music Hall	May 3, 2001	none	none
Notes: Two CD set (2:25:54) with 79 tracks; Released by avex mode
Sakura Wars 4: Fall in Love Maidens Complete Music Collection	April 10, 2002	none	none
Notes: One CD (60:11) with 17 tracks; Released by avex mode
Sakura Wars: In Hot Blood Teigeki Complete Music Collection	February 26, 2003	none	none
Notes: Two CD set (2:23:00) with 62 tracks; Album containing original vocal tracks and updated music tracks from In Hot Blood; Released by avex mode
Sakura Wars V Episode 0: Samurai Daughter of the Wild Complete Music Collection	September 23, 2004	none	none
Notes: One CD (74:45) with 34 tracks; Released by avex mode
Sakura Wars V: So Long, My Love Music Collection: New York Music Hall	September 7, 2005	none	none
Notes: Two CD set (2:13:10) with 56 tracks; Released by avex mode

== Novels and manga ==
Many Sakura Wars games have been adapted as novels and manga series. With the advent of the Internet, web novels and digital publishing have also become common. These stories act as companion pieces, offering an interpretation of the game's events or expanding the plot of the games by depicting additional scenarios.

Sakura Taisen: Zenya; 1997: light novel	Notes: 3-volume light novel written by Satoru Akahori, illustrated by Hidenori Matsubara, and published by MediaWorks' Dengeki Bunko.; Never released outside Japan.
Sakura Taisen; 1999: light novel	Notes: 4-volume light novel written by Satoru Akahori.; Never released outside Japan.
Sakura Taisen: Gouka Kenran; 2001: light novel	Notes: Light novel written by Hiroyuki Kawasaki.; Never released outside Japan.
Sakura Taisen: Taishou Renka; 2001: light novel	Notes: 2-volume light novel written by Hiroyuki Kawasaki.; Never released outside Japan.
Sakura Taisen: Katsudou Shashin; 2002: light novel	Notes: Novelization of Sakura Wars: The Movie by Hiroyuki Kawasaki.; Never released outside Japan.
Sakura Taisen: Pari Zenya; 2004: light novel	Notes: 2-volume light novel written by Satoru Akahori.; Never released outside Japan.
Sakura Taisen; 2003: manga	Notes: Finished manga written by Ouji Hiroi, art by Masa Ikku, and serialized in Kodansha's Magazine Z.; Based on Sakura Taisen.; Translated and released in North America by TOKYOPOP.

== Live performances ==
From 1997 onwards, the voice actors of the series performed onstage and in-character as their Sakura Wars counterparts in a series of live-action musical stage shows. By 2001 to 2006, the Imperial Combat Revue performed two major musicals in a year: a New Year's Show and a Summer Kayou Show, in addition to multitudes of other smaller shows where one or more characters make appearances. Some of the stage performances could be seen in the series' other forms of media.

In August 2006, the Imperial Combat Revue held their final summer show. Although the live-action shows still continue as of May 2007, they are no longer focused entirely on the Imperial Combat Revue.

=== Summer Kayou Shows ===
Ai Yueni (Because of Love)	Notes: First Summer Kayou Show; Performed from July 19 to 21, 1997; Appeared briefly in Sakura Taisen and in the manga.
Tsubasa (Wings)	Notes: Second Summer Kayou Show; Performed from August 11 to 16, 1998; First show to include characters Reni Milchstraβe and Soletta Orihime; First to introduce Dandy Boss and his gang
Beni Tokage (紅蜥蜴 Crimson Lizard)	Notes: Third Summer Kayou Show; Performed from August 4 to 7, 1999; Appeared briefly in Sakura Taisen: Gouka Kenran
Arabia no Bara (アラビアのバラ Rose of Arabia)	Notes: Fourth Summer Kayou Show; Performed from July 23 to August 4, 2000
Kaijin Bessō (The Sea God's Villa)	Notes: Fifth Summer Kayou Show; Performed from August 10 to 18, 2001; Based on Kyōka Izumi's "Kaijin Bessō"; Includes the Paris Hanagumi Tokubetsu ("Paris Flower Division Special) Mini Live Show on August 13, where the Paris Flower Division performed live for the first time.; Appeared near the ending of Sakura Taisen: Katsudou Shashin, though the content was altered

=== Super Kayou Shows ===
Shin-pen Hakkenden (The New Hakkenden)	Notes: First Super Kayou Show; Performed from August 15 to 25, 2002; First kayou show that did not include a live orchestra; Based on Kyokutei Bakin's Nansō Satomi Hakkenden
Shin Takarajima (The New Treasure Island)	Notes: Second Super Kayou Show; Performed from August 15 to 21, 2003; Based on Robert Louis Stevenson's Treasure Island; Recorded album received the 17th Japanese Gold Disc Award for the best Anime Album of the Year in 2003; Appeared briefly in Sakura Taisen
Shin Saiyuki (The New Journey to the West)	Notes: Third Super Kayou Show; Performed from August 13 to 19, 2004; Based on one of the Four Great Classical Novels of Chinese literature, Journey to the West; Appeared briefly in Sakura Taisen
Shin Aoi Tori (The New Blue Bird)	Notes: Fourth Super Kayou Show; Performed from August 13 to 20, 2005; Based on a 1908 play by Maurice Maeterlinck known as "L'Oiseau Bleu"; Appeared briefly in Sakura Taisen 2
Shin Ai Yueni (The New Because of Love)	Notes: Final Super Kayou Show; Performed from August 12 to 22, 2006; Last summer live show focusing on the Teikoku Kagekidan

=== New Year Kayou Shows ===
Shinshun Kayou Show 2001 (2001 New Year Show)	Notes: Performed from January 3 to 7, 2001; First live show featuring the Teikoku Kagekidan performing the taiko
Harukoi Shisumireyume Nowakare	Notes: Sumire Kanzaki's retirement performance, in lieu of a regular New Year show; Performed from January 2 to 6, 2002; Title is reminiscent of kabuki and translates to "Calling up the image of blooming violets at the time of separation, how far I long for spring..."
Shichi Fukujin (Seven Lucky Gods)	Notes: Performed from January 3 to 7, 2003; Refers to the seven gods of good fortune found in the Japanese Shintō religion, mythology, and folklore.
Utae! Hanagumi! (Sing! Hanagumi!)	Notes: Performed from January 2 to 5, 2004
Warae! Hanagumi! (Laugh! Hanagumi!)	Notes: Performed from January 7 to 10, 2005
Tonderu! Hanagumi! (Soar High! Hanagumi!)	Notes: Performed from January 4 to 8, 2006; Villain from Super Kayou Show "Shin Aoi Tori" returns, continuing the "Aoi Tori" story arc.
