= Moeyo Ken (franchise) =

Japanese media franchise

機動新撰組 萌えよ剣 (Kidō Shinsengumi Moeyo Ken)
- Genre: Historical fantasy, supernatural
- Video game
- Developer: Enterbrain
- Publisher: Enterbrain
- Platform: PlayStation 2
- Released: December 26, 2002
- Original video animation
- Directed by: Hideki Tonokatsu
- Produced by: Atsushi Isoyama; Mamoru Ōi; Hiroshi Tsuji
- Written by: Junki Takegami
- Music by: Takeshi Ike
- Studio: Trinet Entertainment, Picture Magic
- Licensed by: NA: ADV Films
- Released: November 19, 2003 – February 18, 2004
- Episodes: 4
- Anime television series
- Directed by: Toshikatsu Tokoro
- Produced by: Saburō Ōmiya; Takashi Nakanishi
- Written by: Junki Takegami
- Music by: Noriyasu Agematsu
- Studio: Trinet Entertainment; Picture Magic
- Licensed by: NA: Funimation ADV Films (former)
- Original network: TV Tokyo, Television Saitama, Aichi Television Broadcasting
- Original run: July 1, 2005 – September 23, 2005
- Episodes: 13

Moeyo Ken, known in Japan as Kidō Shinsengumi Moeyo Ken (Japanese: 機動新撰組 萌えよ剣) is a Japanese multimedia franchise consisting of a PlayStation 2 video game, an original video animation (OVA) series, and a television anime series. The franchise was created by multimedia developer Oji Hiroi (creator of the Sakura Wars franchise) and features character designs by prominent manga artist Rumiko Takahashi (creator of Urusei Yatsura, Ranma ½, and Inuyasha).

The property originated as a tactical strategy role-playing video game developed and published by Enterbrain and released in Japan on December 26, 2002. The success of the game led to a four-episode OVA adaptation produced by Picture Magic and Trinet Entertainment and released between November 19, 2003, and February 18, 2004. A subsequent 13-episode anime television series followed in 2005 which was broadcast from July 1 to September 23. The OVA series was later licensed for an English-language home video release by ADV Films at a price of $43,335. This license officially took effect on September 25, 2006.

== Premise ==
The story is set in an alternate-universe Meiji era Kyoto in 1882 where, under the laws of the alternate Meiji government, all supernatural entities residing with humans must be formally licensed. Rogue spirits known as mononoke cause civil unrest in the era of ultra-rapid modernization depicted.

To restore public order, the Kyoto Prefectural Police establishes a special paramilitary unit called the "Mobile Shinsengumi" to act as the primary enforcers of the registration system. Heavily debt-ridden from its founding costs, the unit is staffed by Yuko Kondo, Toshie Hijikata, and Kaoru Okita, daughters of the original historical Shinsengumi leaders, who must slay supernatural monsters to maintain the peace and pay off the organization's debts.

The primary narrative follows the arrival of Ryunosuke Sakamoto, the son of the organization's director, who travels from Shanghai, China, to Kyoto. Ryunosuke is accompanied by Nekomaru, his properly-licensed companion bakeneko (a supernatural shape-shifting cat spirit).

== Characters ==
=== The Mobile Shinsengumi ===
Ryunosuke Sakamoto
Voiced by: Chisa Yokoyama (Japanese); Evan Slack (OVA), Blake Shepard (TV series) (English)
Ryunosuke Sakamoto (坂本 竜之介, Sakamoto Ryūnosuke) is the son of Oryou, president of the Shinsengumi. Ryuunosuke was sent to Shanghai at the age of ten to learn more about the world. He recently returned from Shanghai and brought a monster named Nekomaru to Kyoto for registration. Ryunosuke is a bit odd and has a peculiar sense of humor, but he is nevertheless determined to help out the Mobile Shinsengumi. He seems to also have a crush on Yuko. In the 8th episode of the series he temporarily turns into a girl because Nekomaru killed him with soap and switched his soul with that of a female.
Yuko Kondo
Voiced by: Ai Orikasa (Japanese); Jenny Larson (English)
Yuko Kondo (近藤 勇子, Kondō Yūko) is the daughter of Isami Kondo and field commander of the Mobile Shinsengumi. She has a habit of breaking her sword in battle, and a tendency to rack up debts wherever she goes. Yuko is slightly scatterbrained and has pink hair, and enjoys making fun of Okita's breasts.
Kondo seems to be the fondest of the three girls of Oryou, since she frequently imagines the older woman committing suicide if Ryuunosuke were to return to Shanghai. To prevent this from happening, she comes up with various harebrained ideas to keep the young man in Kyoto by making him fall in love with a local waitress named Sayoko. Most of her plans to make the pair fall in love fail miserably, and soon her plans become less about preventing his departure and more about succeeding.
Kondo somewhat resembles the female version of Ranma Saotome from Ranma ½, with her tomboyish attitude, huge appetite, crazy schemes and constant debts.
Toshie Hijikata
Voiced by: Naoko Matsui (Japanese); Laurie Gallardo (English)
Toshie Hijikata (土方 歳絵, Hijikata Toshie) is the daughter of Toshizo Hijikata and the Mobile Shinsengumi's crackshot sharpshooter. While she may be an expert on guns, she is not an excellent cook (due to having a bad sense of taste). Not much of her background is known, but apparently she cannot remember her mother's face and the only photo she has of her is missing a face. As a result, Gennai created a "mother" robot that is an exact double of Toshie, which caused some confusion.
Hijikata seems to be the most intelligent of the three girls, since she is seen relaxing in a hot spring by reading a Jules Verne book. She is also the most logical of them, to the point where Kondo often claims she's like a machine. She also strongly resembles a female version of Sesshomaru from Inuyasha, since she has similar long white hair, Chinese-influenced clothes, an icy attitude and is dismissive of slapstick.
Kaoru Okita
Voiced by: Haruna Ikezawa (Japanese); Jessica Schwartz (OVA), Nancy Novotny (TV series) (English)
Kaoru Okita (沖田 薫, Okita Kaoru) is the daughter of Soji Okita. She uses all sorts of weapons including shikigami of the legendary beasts (Genbu, Byakko, Seiryu and Suzaku). Kaoru takes it personally when she's told about her breast size.
It is revealed later in the series that Okita is actually only half human, having a kitsune mother who married Soji Okita and later abandoned her daughter, claiming she couldn't live among humans. She also has a kitsune older brother. Additionally, she develops a major crush on Ryuunosuke.
Nekmaru
Voiced by: Mayumi Tanaka (Japanese); Edwin Neal (English)
Nekomaru (猫丸) is a bakeneko, a monster cat, who traveled with Ryunosuke from Shanghai to Kyoto. Nekomaru whines and cowers whenever there is trouble, which becomes more understandable as the series goes on because Gennai frequently uses him as a guinea pig.
Nekomaru is 300 years old and seems to have a fair amount of power. His most useful ability is being able to transfer one of his nine lives to someone who has died, resurrecting them in perfect health. He seems particularly fond of Ryunosuke and seems to want the young man to be happy.
Gennai Hiraga
Voiced by: Shin-ichiro Miki (Japanese); Leraldo Anzaldua (English)
Gennai Hiraga (平賀 源内, Hiraga Gennai) is the Mobile Shinsengumi's resident mad doctor who builds new weapons and gadgets to aid the team in stopping unlicensed monsters from destroying Tokyo. Most of his gadgets are useless and/or dangerous, such as the digging machine fueled by monsters' power. However, he is an excellent cook and a few of his gadgets are actually useful.
Gennai does have a ruthless side: he often uses Nekomaru to test his inventions, which frequently has unpleasant results for the monster cat. And if people around him aren't sufficiently helpful, he acquires gleaming eyes and a demonic rumbling voice. Nekomaru claims that Gennai is even more of a monster than he is.
Gennai strongly resembles Dr. Tofu from Rumiko Takahashi's Ranma ½.
Kiyomi Watase
Voiced by: Kahoru Sasajima (Japanese); Meg Bauman (OVA), Luci Christian (TV series) (English)
Kiyomi Watase (渡瀬 きよみ, Watase Kiyomi) works directly under Hiraga Gennai as his engineer assistant. She also utilizes medical skills to operate as the medical nurse for the Mobile Shinsengumi squad. She has a "sharp-tongued" (dokuzetsu) or blunt conversational style. Despite her biting verbal delivery, she is fundamentally kind-hearted, reliable, and deeply capable in her medical and technical duties.

=== The Tsubame Group ===
The Tsubame Group Tsubame-gumi (つばめ組) serves as the primary antagonistic faction in the series. Operating during the alternate Meiji era, they oppose the newly established government's monster registration laws and attempt to return the localized supernatural entities to their untamed, original states. The trio's dynamic, repetitive schemes and comedic failures heavily mirror classic antagonist teams like Team Rocket from the Pokémon franchise.

Miki Saotome
Voiced by: Rumi Kasahara (Japanese); Shannon Grounds (English)
The cruel, arrogant, and authoritative leader of the Tsubame Group. A former shrine priestess whose sanctuary was destroyed by monsters, she now practices black magic to summon destructive entities to her side. Her ultimate goal is to dismantle the Mobile Shinsengumi, destroy Kyoto, and achieve world domination. It's hinted that she may have feelings for Ukon, but this is not specifically made clear as she frequently treats her subordinates as disposable servants.
Ukon Tanaka
Voiced by: Takeshi Kusao (Japanese); Gray Haddock (English)
The group's second-in-command and primary combatant. He is a fierce, courageous, yet highly vain swordsman who fights using a traditional samurai katana. Before joining the group, he trained to become a master swordsman but abandoned his ambitions after a humiliating tournament defeat. He views himself as a noble knight and often addresses Miki as his "princess".
Sakon Suzuki
Voiced by: Toshihiko Nakajima (Japanese); Bill Wise (English
A short, fat, gluttonous, eccentric member of the trio who exhibits an obsessive love for Chinese cabbage. He frequently suffers from random outbursts and derails operations by bringing up food at highly inappropriate moments. Despite his chaotic appetite and odd behavior, he is fiercely loyal to Miki and Ukon. He fights with a wooden self-crafted bazooka.
