= Masaru Ikeda =

Japanese actor (1942–2026)

- 池田 勝
- Born: September 27, 1942; Tokyo, Japan
- Died: January 31, 2026 (aged 83)
- Occupations: Actor; voice actor
- Years active: 1963–2026
- Agent: Haikyō
- Website: Official profile

Masaru Ikeda (池田 勝, Ikeda Masaru; September 27, 1942 – January 31, 2026) was a Japanese actor and voice actor from Tokyo affiliated with Haikyō.

He is best known for his roles in Yatterman (as the Yatter Machines), Sakura Taisen (as Ikki Yoneda). He was also well known for providing the Japanese dubbing roles for actors such as Danny Glover.

== Biography ==
Ikeda was born in Tokyo on September 27, 1942. He was poor at speaking in front of people, leading him to pursue a career as an actor, but noted that he had a minor-oriented mindset.

He was a graduate of the Tokyo Metropolitan Fifth Commercial High School and the Stage Art Academy.

He joined the Toen Theater Company in 1963 and was active as an actor. He made his debut as a stage actor playing the role of Shuzen Kawase in Junji Kinoshita's play "Wind and Waves". From the mid-1970s, he also began working as a voice actor, participating in numerous anime series and foreign dubs. In 1991, he mentioned that he could not make a living solely from stage acting and was on his way to a dubbing session. When asked in a 1991 interview, "Do you have any regrets?", he reportedly replied, "The world of theater is a place where you can turn a minor-oriented mindset into a positive," and "To be honest, it is a wonderful world where you can appear greater than your actual life-sized self". On stage, he was particularly well-known for performing as the counterpart to actress Komaki Kurihara.

=== Death ===
Ikeda died from heart failure caused by a myocardial infarction on January 31, 2026, at the age of 83. His agency Haikyō announced the news days later on February 16 of that year.

== Filmography ==
=== Television animation ===
1970s

- Invincible Super Man Zambot 3 (1977) (Head of the Police Station)
- Yatterman (1977) (Yatterwan)
- Future Boy Conan (1978) (Pasco)
- Gatchaman II (1978) (Gel Sadra)
- Mobile Suit Gundam (1979) (General Revil, Clink)
- Doraemon (1979) (Toshio Minamoto (Shizuka's father)) (Second voice))
- The Ultraman (1979) (Erek)

1980s

- Space Runaway Ideon (1980) (Abadede Gurimade)
- Fang of the Sun Dougram (1981) (Rick Boyd)
- Miss Machiko (1981) (Machiko's Grandfather)
- Combat Mecha Xabungle (1982) (Bigman)
- Heavy Metal L-Gaim (1984) (Daba Hassā)
- Dancougar - Super Beast Machine God (1985) (Ross Igor)
- Mobile Suit Zeta Gundam (1985) (Jamitov Hymem (first voice))
- City Hunter (1987) (Michael Gallant)

1990s

- Tekkaman Blade (1992) (Bernard O'Toole)
- Mahōjin Guru Guru (1994) (Uruga the Thirteenth)

2000s

- Sakura Wars (2000) (Ikki Yoneda)
- Alcatraz Connection (2001) (Max)
- Pokémon (2001) (The Mysterious Thief Gorōna)
- Episode 0: First Contact (2002) (Crawford)
- Agatha Christie's Great Detectives Poirot and Marple (2004) (Oparusen)
- Monster (2004) (Director Udo Haineman)
- Phoenix The Great King Tenji (2004) (Emperor Tenji))
- Death Note (2006) (Koreyoshi Kitamura)
- Kirarin Revolution (2006) (Ginzō Higashiyama)
- Darker than Black (2007) (Huang)

2010s

- Night Raid 1931 (2010) (Jiro Minami)
- One Piece (2016) (Nekomamushi)

=== Original video animation (OVA) ===
- Heavy Metal L-Gaim (1987) (Hassā)
- Armored Trooper Votoms: The Red Shoulder Document: Roots of Ambition (1988) (Rīman)
- Legend of the Galactic Heroes (1989) (Borodin, Commodore Bei)
- Mobile Suit Gundam 0083: Stardust Memory (1991) (Noein Peter)
- Record of Lodoss War (1991) (Elmer)
- Hello Harinezumi: Domain of Murder (1992) (Kyusaku Kogure)
- Sakura Wars series (1997-1998, 1999–2000, 2002) (Ikki Yoneda)
- The Heroic Legend of Arslan (????) (Valphreze)

=== Theatrical animation ===
- Mobile Suit Gundam II: Soldiers of Sorrow (1981) (Boraskyniv)
- Mobile Suit Gundam III: Encounters in Space (1982) (Dren)
- Dougram: Documentary of the Fang of the Sun (1983) (Rick Boyd)
- Mobile Suit Gundam: Char's Counterattack (1988) (Horst Harness)
- The Heroic Legend of Arslan (1991) (Valphreze)
- Metropolis (2001) (President Boone)
- Sakura Wars: The Movie (2001) (Ikki Yoneda)
- Trotting Hamtaro: The Captive Princess (2002) (King Hamja)
- Dokidoki! PreCure the Movie: Mana's Getting Married!!? The Dress of Hope Tied to the Future! (2013) (Clarinet)

=== Video games ===
- Crash Bandicoot 3: Warped (1998) (Doctor Nefarious Tropy) (Japanese dub)
- Crash Team Racing (1999) (Doctor Nefarious Tropy) (Japanese dub)
- Crash Bandicoot: The Wrath of Cortex (2001) (Doctor Nefarious Tropy, Lo-Lo the Air Elemental) (Japanese dub)
- Digimon Story: Cyber Sleuth (2015) (Gorou Matayoshi)
- Digimon Story: Cyber Sleuth - Hacker's Memory (2017) (Gorou Matayoshi)
- Sakura Wars series (????) (Ikki Yoneda)
- Suikoden V (????) (Logg, Wabon, Levi, Jidan Guisu)
- Tom Clancy's Splinter Cell series (????) (Colonel Irving Lambert) (Japanese dub)
- Xenosaga series (????) (Helmer)
- Crash Bandicoot 4: It's About Time (2020) (Doctor Nefarious Tropy) (Japanese dub)

=== Live action dubbing ===
- Morgan Freeman
  - Glory (Sergeant Major John Rawlins)
  - The Shawshank Redemption (Ellis Boyd "Red" Redding)
  - Seven (1998 Fuji TV edition) (Detective Lt. William Somerset)
  - Chain Reaction (Dr. Paul Shannon)
  - The Sum of All Fears (2004 Fuji TV edition) (William Cabot)
  - Dreamcatcher (Colonel Abraham Kurtz)
  - Levity (Miles Evans)
  - An Unfinished Life (Mitch Bradley)
  - Batman Begins (Lucius Fox)
  - 10 Items or Less (Him)
  - The Dark Knight (Lucius Fox)
  - Dolphin Tale (Dr. Cameron McCarthy)
  - The Dark Knight Rises (Lucius Fox)
  - Angel Has Fallen (President Allan Trumbull)
- Danny Glover
  - Witness (1990 TV Asahi edition) (James McFee)
  - Lethal Weapon (1997 TV Asahi edition) (Roger Murtaugh)
  - Bat*21 (Capt. Bartholomew 'Bird-Dog' Clark)
  - Lethal Weapon 2 (1993 TV Asahi edition) (Roger Murtaugh)
  - Predator 2 (1994 TV Asahi edition) (Lieutenant Mike Harrigan)
  - Lethal Weapon 3 (1995 TV Asahi edition) (Roger Murtaugh)
  - Angels in the Outfield (George Knox)
  - Operation Dumbo Drop (Captain Sam Cahill)
  - Lethal Weapon 4 (2003 TV Asahi edition) (Roger Murtaugh)
  - Saw (Detective David Tapp)
  - The Shaggy Dog (Ken Hollister)
  - Saw V (Detective David Tapp)
- Samuel L. Jackson
  - Die Hard with a Vengeance (Zeus Carver)
  - Fluke (Rumbo)
  - Kiss of Death (Detective Calvin Hart)
  - Deep Blue Sea (Russell Franklin)
  - Rules of Engagement (Col. Terry L. Childers)
  - The Caveman's Valentine (Romulus Ledbetter)
  - Changing Lanes (Doyle Gipson)
  - Home of the Brave (LTC William "Will" Marsh)
- Robert De Niro
  - Brazil (Archibald "Harry" Tuttle)
  - The Untouchables (Al Capone)
  - Midnight Run (1992 TV Asahi edition) (Jack Walsh)
  - Guilty by Suspicion (David Merrill)
  - 15 Minutes (NYPD Detective Eddie Flemming)
  - Machete (Senator John McLaughlin)
- The Abyss (Catfish De Vries (Leo Burmester))
- Amélie (Raphaël Poulain (Rufus))
- Angel Has Fallen (Clay Banning (Nick Nolte))
- Anger Management (Dr. Buddy Rydell (Jack Nicholson))
- Armageddon (2002 Fuji TV edition) (Dan Truman (Billy Bob Thornton))
- Beverly Hills Cop III (Steve Fulbright (Stephen McHattie))
- Blade (Abraham Whistler (Kris Kristofferson))
- The Boondock Saints (Noah "Il Duce" MacManus (Billy Connolly))
- The Boondock Saints II: All Saints Day (Noah "Il Duce" MacManus (Billy Connolly), Concezio Yakavetta (Judd Nelson))
- Born on the Fourth of July (1993 TV Asahi edition) (Mr. Kovic (Raymond J. Barry))
- Bram Stoker's Dracula (15th Anniversary edition) (Professor Abraham Van Helsing (Anthony Hopkins))
- Charlie's Angels (2003 TV Asahi edition) (John Bosley (Bill Murray))
- The Claim (Daniel Dillon (Peter Mullan))
- The Comebacks (Freddie Wiseman (Carl Weathers))
- Coneheads (Beldar Conehead / Donald R. DeCicco (Dan Aykroyd))
- Courage Under Fire (Brigadier General Hershberg (Michael Moriarty))
- Crossbones (Blackbeard (John Malkovich))
- Das Boot (Obermaschinist Johann (Erwin Leder), Kapitänleutnant Philipp Thomsen (Otto Sander))
- Das Boot (1983 Fuji TV edition) (Obersteuermann Kriechbaum (Bernd Tauber))
- Deep Rising (2000 TV Asahi edition) (Simon Canton (Anthony Heald))
- Desperate Measures (Jeremiah Cassidy (Brian Cox))
- Die Hard (Eddie (Dennis Hayden))
- Die Hard 2 (Captain Carmine Lorenzo (Dennis Franz))
- Die Hard with a Vengeance (1999 TV Asahi edition) (Walter Cobb (Larry Bryggman))
- Double Jeopardy (Travis Lehman (Tommy Lee Jones))
- Dr. Dolittle 2 (Joseph Potter (Jeffrey Jones))
- Dragonheart (Gilbert of Glockenspur (Pete Postlethwaite))
- El Camino Christmas (Sheriff Bob Fuller (Kurtwood Smith))
- Eraser (1999 NTV edition) (US Marshal Robert Deguerin (James Caan))
- Escape from Absolum (Marek (Stuart Wilson))
- Exit Wounds (2004 NTV edition) (Frank Daniels (Bruce McGill))
- The Expendables (General Garza (David Zayas)))
- Fallen (Lt. Stanton (Donald Sutherland))
- Falling Down (Sergeant Martin Prendergast (Robert Duvall))
- The Firm (Avery Tolar (Gene Hackman))
- First Blood (1993 Fuji TV edition) (Sheriff Will Teasle (Brian Dennehy))
- The Fisher King (Parry (Robin Williams))
- Flash Gordon (1992 TV Asahi edition) (Hans Zarkov (Topol))
- Four Christmases (Howard McVie (Robert Duvall))
- The Fourth Kind (August Thompson (Will Patton))
- The Full Monty (Barrington "Horse" Mitchell (Paul Barber))
- The Galloping Gourmet (Graham Kerr)
- Gangs of New York (William "Boss" Tweed (Jim Broadbent))
- The Great Escape (2000 TV Tokyo edition) (Squadron Leader Roger Bartlett (Richard Attenborough))
- Halloween II (1988 NTV edition) (Sheriff Leigh Brackett (Charles Cyphers))
- Hand of Death (Officer Tu Ching (Sammo Hung))
- The Hunt for Red October (1993 TBS edition) (Vasily Borodin (Sam Neill))
- I.Q. (Louis Bamberger (Charles Durning))
- Iron Will (Borg Guillarson)
- Island of Fire (Kui (Jimmy Wang Yu))
- Jappeloup (2021 BS TV Tokyo edition) (John Lester (Donald Sutherland))
- The Killer (Hay Wong Hoi (Shing Fui-On))
- The Last Emperor (1989 TV Asahi edition) (Big Li (Dennis Dun))
- Lawrence of Arabia (2000 TV Tokyo edition) (Jackson Bentley (Arthur Kennedy))
- Léon: The Professional (1997 VHS edition) (Tony (Danny Aiello))
- Little Voice (Mr. Boo (Jim Broadbent))
- Lonely Hearts (Detective Charles Hildebrandt (James Gandolfini))
- A Man Apart (Memo "Diablo" Lucero (Geno Silva))
- Mary Poppins Returns (Admiral Boom (David Warner))
- Midnight in the Garden of Good and Evil (Jim Williams (Kevin Spacey))
- Mission: Impossible (Franz Krieger (Jean Reno))
- Monk (Charles Kroger (Stanley Kamel))
- Multiplicity (Dr. Leeds (Harris Yulin))
- The Muppet Christmas Carol (Ebenezer Scrooge (Michael Caine))
- New Fist of Fury (Okimura (Chan Sing))
- The One (Harry Rodecker (Delroy Lindo))
- A Perfect Murder (Detective Mohamed Karaman (David Suchet))
- Platoon (1989 TV Asahi edition) (Captain Harris (Dale Dye))
- Police Story 3: Super Cop (Panther (Yuen Wah))
- The Protector (Harold Ko (Roy Chiao))
- Ransom (Agent Lonnie Hawkins (Delroy Lindo))
- The Replacements (Jimmy McGinty (Gene Hackman))
- RoboCop (VHS edition) (Clarence Boddicker (Kurtwood Smith))
- The Rock (1999 NTV edition) (Ernest Paxton (William Forsythe))
- The Running Man (1989 Fuji TV edition) (William Laughlin (Yaphet Kotto))
- Smoke (Cyrus Cole (Forest Whitaker))
- The Sopranos (Tony Soprano (James Gandolfini))
- Stella (Ed Munn (John Goodman))
- Striking Distance (Nick Detillo (Dennis Farina))
- Stuart Little (TV edition) (Smokey (Chazz Palminteri))
- Supernatural (Samuel Campbell (Mitch Pileggi))
- Sweet November (Chaz Watley (Jason Isaacs))
- The Ten Commandments (Dathan (Edward G. Robinson))
- Terminal Velocity (Ben Pinkwater (James Gandolfini))
- Thunderball (1977 TBS edition) (Felix Leiter (Rik Van Nutter))
- A Time to Kill (Rufus Buckley (Kevin Spacey))
- Tomorrow Never Dies (2002 TV Asahi edition) (Jack Wade (Joe Don Baker))
- Top Gun (2005 NTV edition) (CDR Tom "Stinger" Jordan (James Tolkan))
- Twilight (Jack Ames (Gene Hackman))
- Twin Peaks (Bureau Chief Gordon Cole (David Lynch))
- U Turn (Jake McKenna (Nick Nolte))
- Under Siege (1995 TV Asahi edition) (William "Bill" Strannix (Tommy Lee Jones))
- Universal Soldier (Col. Perry (Ed O'Ross))
- A View to a Kill (1991 TBS edition) (Bob Conley (Manning Redwood))
- Wall Street (1992 TV Asahi edition) (Sir Larry Wildman (Terence Stamp))
- Waterworld (The Deacon (Dennis Hopper))

=== Animated dubbing ===
- Aladdin and the King of Thieves (Cassim)
- Batman: The Animated Series (Mr. Freeze)
- Batman & Mr. Freeze: SubZero (Mr. Freeze)
- Batman Beyond (Mister Freeze)
- Cars (Sheriff)
- Cars 2 (Sheriff)
- Cars 3 (Sheriff)
- PB&J Otter (Cap'n Crane)
- The New Batman Adventures (Mr. Freeze)
- Oliver & Company (Dom DeLuise) (Fagin)
