= Hidenori Matsubara =

Japanese animator, character designer, illustrator (born 1965)

- 松原 秀典
- Born: November 15, 1965 (age 60); Nanto, Toyama, Japan
- Occupations: Character designer, Animator, Illustrator
- Notable work: Oh My Goddess!, Sakura Wars, The Princess and the Pilot, in This Corner of the World

Hidenori Matsubara (松原 秀典, Matsubara Hidenori; born in November 15, 1965) is a Japanese anime character designer and director.

== Biography ==
In 1988, Matsubara joined Gainax. In 1996, after finishing the Neon Genesis Evangelion series, he left Gainax and worked as a freelancer for various TV series and OVAs. He was the character designer and animation director on the 1995 OVA series Oh My Goddess! which had five episodes, and then its feature film Ah! My Goddess: The Movie in 2000. He would then reprise his role as character designer for the 2005 TV series which ran for 2 seasons. He did the character design for the Sakura Wars anime television series in 2000, and for its various OVA location-based sequels including Paris and New York. In 2003, he provided the character design for the anime television series Gankutsuou: The Count of Monte Cristo, where he was noted for his art style full of lavish patterns instead of solid colors.

He provided the character designs for the anime film The Princess and the Pilot In 2006, Hideaki Anno and Yoshiyuki Sadamoto asked Matsubara to join Khara and he has been working there since then. He visited Anime Expo in 2001 and 2002, Anime Central in 2002 and 2003 and Anime USA in 2002. and would later return to the U.S. for Otakon and Animazement.

== Filmography ==
List of works in anime
Year	Series	Crew role	Notes	Source
1993	Oh My Goddess!	Character design, Chief Animation Director	OVA series	
1994	Metal Fighter Miku	Key Animation		
1995	Elementalors	Character design		
1999	Sakura Wars: The Radiant Gorgeous Blooming Cherry Blossoms	Character design	OVA	
2000	Sakura Wars	Character design	TV series	
2000	Ah! My Goddess: The Movie	Character design, Chief animation director	Film	
2001	Sakura Wars: The Movie	Character design		
2003	Sakura Taisen: École de Paris	Character design	OVA	
2004–05	Gankutsuou: The Count of Monte Cristo	Character design		
2004	Sakura Taisen: Le Nouveau Paris	Character design	OVA	
2005–06	Ah! My Goddess	Character design	2 TV series	
2007	Sakura Wars: New York	Character design	OVA	
2007	Evangelion: 1.0 You Are (Not) Alone	Animation director		
2007	Ah! My Goddess: Fighting Wings	Characters design	2-part OVA for 20th anniversary	
2009	Evangelion: 2.0 You Can (Not) Advance	Animation director		
2010	King of Thorn	Character design	film	
2011	The Princess and the Pilot	Character design	film	
2012	Evangelion: 3.0 You Can (Not) Redo	Key animation		
2013	Aa Megami-sama Dive! Live! Love!	Character design	3rd OAD	
2014	Space Battleship Yamato 2199	Animation director		
2016	In This Corner of the World	Character Design, Chief Animation Director		

== Other media ==
=== Books ===
- 松原秀典アートワークス (Hidenori Matsubara Art works) -2006
- 松原秀典イラストワークス (Hidenori Matsubara Illustration works) -2010

=== Others ===
- Hidenori Matsubara Sakura Taisen Collection 2003 art exhibit
- Takaoka City Sightseeing ambassador あみたん娘 (Amitan Musume) - Character Design - 2012
