= Shintarō Sonooka =

- Born: November 9, 1954 (age 71); Shizuoka, Shizuoka, Japan
- Occupations: Actor, voice actor
- Website: http://shintaro.boyfriend.jp/

Shintarō Sonooka (園岡新太郎, Sonooka Shintarō; born November 9, 1954) is a Japanese actor and voice actor from Shizuoka, Shizuoka. He is attached to Bambina and was previously attached to the Shiki Theatre Company.

== Filmography ==
=== Television drama ===
- Kōmyō Gatsuji (2006) – Heizaburō Isono

=== Musicals ===
- Annie (1990) – Rooster
- Cats (1983) – Munkustrap
- Miss Saigon (1992–1993) – John
- Sakura Taisen Kayō Show – Kōsuke Dan

=== Television animation ===
- Yu-Gi-Oh! Duel Monsters (2002) – Konosuke Oshita
- Gunslinger Girl (2003) – Franco
- Get Ride! AM Driver (2004) – Father
- Mutsu Enmei Ryū Gaiden: Shura no Toki (2004) – Genjirō Kuki

=== OVA ===
- Sakura Wars: The Radiant Gorgeous Blooming Cherry Blossoms (1999) – Kōsuke Dan

=== Video games ===
- Kingdom Hearts (2002) – Lock
- Kingdom Hearts II (2005) – Captain Li Shang, Lock
- Kingdom Hearts 358/2 Days (2009) – Lock

=== Dubbing roles ===
==== Live-action ====
- Blood In Blood Out – Paco Aguilar (Benjamin Bratt)
- Exodus: Gods and Kings – Aaron (Andrew Tarbet)
- Métal Hurlant Chronicles – Sheriff Jones (Michael Biehn), Holgarth (John Rhys-Davies)
- The Muppet Christmas Carol – Rizzo the Rat
- Muppet Treasure Island – Rizzo the Rat
- Space Jam – Monstar Bupkus

==== Animation ====
- Alice in Wonderland – Broom Dog
- The Land Before Time IV: Journey Through the Mists – Ichy
- Mulan – Captain Li Shang
- Mulan II – General Li Shang
- The Nightmare Before Christmas – Lock
- Pocahontas – Kocoum
- The Powerpuff Girls – Him, Ace, Junior
