= Jenny Larson =

American actress

Jenny Larson is an American film, theater and voice actress who primarily did voice work for ADV Films prior to its closure in 2009. She is most well known for her roles as Sakura in the Sakura Wars anime series, and Potamos in Wedding Peach.

== Filmography ==
=== Live-action ===
- Gretchen - Charlene
- The Man From Orlando - Girl #1 in Bar

== Anime roles ==
- 009-1 - Mysterious Woman, Golden Cyborg
- Comic Party Revolution - Subaru Mikage
- Comic Party Revolution (OVA) - Subaru Mikage
- Cosplay Complex - Reika
- Dai-Guard - Yokozawa's Sister, additional voices
- Get Backers - Riko Tachibana
- Moeyo Ken - Yuko Kondo
- Moeyo Ken (OVA) - Yuko Kondo
- Petite Princess Yucie - Frere
- Sakura Wars (TV series) - Sakura Shinguji
- Sonic Soldier Borgman Last Battle - Anice Farm
- Sonic Soldier Borgman Lover's Rain - Anice Farm
- Wedding Peach - Potamos/Hiromi Kawanami
- Wedding Peach DX - Potamos/Hiromi Kawanami
