= Kami Voice =

Japanese manga series

神☆ヴォイス (Kami ☆ Vuoisu)
- Manga
- Written by: Yoshiki Sakurai and Team G.V.
- Illustrated by: Kuroko Yabuguchi
- Published by: Kodansha
- Magazine: Monthly Shōnen Rival
- Original run: 2011 – present
- Live-action film

Kami☆Voice~The Voice Makes a Miracle~ 神☆ヴォイス～THE VOICE MAKES A MIRACLE～
- Directed by: Tomoki Sano
- Written by: Yoshiki Sakurai
- Released: November 19, 2011

Kami Voice (神☆ヴォイス, Kami ☆ Vuoisu) is a Japanese manga series written by Yoshiki Sakurai and Team G.V. and illustrated by Kuroko Yabuguchi. A live action film adaptation was released on November 19, 2011.

== Cast ==
- Yūki Kaji as Siraike Yū
- Wataru Hatano as Kubodera Tatsuma
- Showtaro Morikubo as Oda Hareruya
- Daisuke Namikawa as Kobayakawa Ku'on
- Romi Park as Takeda Sayuri
- Mamoru Miyano as Asai Kanade
- Hiroshi Kamiya as Narrator
- Mayumi Tanaka
- Masako Nozawa
- Yoshimasa Hosoya
- Shigeru Chiba
- Keaton Yamada
- Rikiya Koyama
- Kōichi Yamadera
- Michio Hazama
- Roko Takizawa
- Takuya Eguchi as Tetsurō
- Arthur Lounsbery as Cristian
- Asuma as Rodriguez
- Kōhei Aoyama as Titan
- Ayumi Okamura as Light
- Mizuki Sako as Iwashimizu
- Tarou Tanaka as DJ Yoshi
- Kunihiro Maeda as Pompadour
- Yūki Matsuoka as Big four–eyes Kikuchi
- Teruya Mori as Rin
- Kazuya Yamaguchi
