= Sakura Wars: The Gorgeous Blooming Cherry Blossoms =

1997 original video animation

- Cover of the first VHS

サクラ大戦 ～桜華絢爛～ (Sakura Taisen: Ōka Kenran)
- Created by: Oji Hiroi
- Original video animation
- Directed by: Takaaki Ishiyama
- Produced by: Masaki Sawanobori; Emi Sasaki; Kazumi Kawashiro; Motohiko Houjou (1); Yasuaki Nagoshi (2–4)
- Written by: Satoru Akahori
- Music by: Kohei Tanaka
- Studio: Radix
- Licensed by: NA: ADV Films (1998–2009)
- Released: December 18, 1997 – July 25, 1998
- Runtime: 25–30 minutes
- Episodes: 4
- Related works
- Sakura Wars (game franchise); Sakura Wars: The Radiant Gorgeous Blooming Cherry Blossoms (OVA, sequel); Sakura Wars: The Movie (Film, sequel); Sakura Wars (TV series, 1st remake); Sakura Wars: The Animation (TV series, 2nd remake)

Sakura Wars: The Gorgeous Blooming Cherry Blossoms (サクラ大戦 ～桜華絢爛～, Sakura Taisen: Ōka Kenran) is a 1997 Japanese original video animation (OVA) produced by Animate Film, Bandai Visual, and Sega and animated by Radix. It ran for four episodes and is the first OVA based on the Sakura Wars video games. The episodes were released in VHS and LaserDisc formats.

The OVA was announced as the first joint product to result from the proposed merger between Sega (owner of the Sakura Wars franchise) and Bandai (Bandai Visual's parent company). Though the merger was called off shortly afterwards, the OVA project proceeded as planned. ADV Films announced they had licensed the OVA series in North America in May 1998 at Project A-Kon 9; it was the first piece of Sakura Wars media made officially available in the region.

It depicts the formation of the Imperial Assault Troupe's Flower Division leading up to the beginning of the original game where the player character takes command of the unit.

== Theme songs ==
- Openings
1. "Attack! Imperial Floral Assault Team" (檄！帝国華撃団, Geki! Teikoku Kageki-dan)
  - Lyricist: Ouji Hiroi / Composer: Kohei Tanaka / Arranger: Takayuki Negishi / Singers: Chisa Yokoyama (Sakura Shinguji) & The Imperial Floral Assault Team
- Endings
1. "My Blue Sky" (わたしの青空, Watashi no Aozora)
  - Lyricist: Ouji Hiroi / Composer: Kohei Tanaka / Arranger: Takayuki Negishi / Singers: Ai Orikasa (Ayame Fujieda)
  - Episodes: 1-3
2. "The Maiden's Flowers Bloom" (花咲く乙女, Hana Saku Otome)
  - Lyricist: Ouji Hiroi / Composer: Kohei Tanaka / Arranger: Akifumi Tada / Singers: The Imperial Floral Assault Team
  - Episodes: 4
- Insert Songs
1. "A Dizzy Deck" (甲板フラフラ, Kanpan Furafura)
  - Lyricist: Ouji Hiroi / Composer: Kohei Tanaka / Arranger: Akifumi Tada / Singers: Akio Suyama (Ichirō Ōgami)
  - Episodes: 1-2
2. "Cherry Blossom" (さくら, Sakura)
  - Lyricist: Ouji Hiroi / Composer: Kohei Tanaka / Arranger: Masami Kishimura / Singers: Akio Suyama (Ichirō Ōgami)
  - Episodes: 2
3. "Dance Festival" (お祭りダンス, Omatsuri Dansu)
  - Lyricist: Ouji Hiroi / Composer: Kohei Tanaka / Arranger: Masami Kishimura / Singers: Akio Suyama (Ichirō Ōgami)
  - Episodes: 3

== Episodes ==
No.	Title	Directed by	Written by	Original release date
1	"Act 1: Battle in the Flowery Capital"; Transliteration: "Dai Ichi-maku: Hana no Miyako no Hanaikusa" (Japanese: 第一幕 華の都の花いくさ)	Takaaki Ishiyama	Hiroyuki Kawasaki	December 18, 1997
In 1919 (8th year of the Taishō era), operations to recruit members of the Imperial Magnificent Assault Group (帝国華撃団 Teigoku Kagekidan) begin to protect Japan from an imminent demon (魔物, mamono) attack. In Ginza, Tokyo, Kanzaki Heavy Industries is developing the Obu (桜武, Ōbu), the first Spiricle Armor who after failed attempts to be controlled by other pilots, is finally mastered by Kanzaki family's daughter, Sumire Kanzaki, due to her high psychic powers. In Sendai, Sakura Shinguji reflects on the death of her father who gave his life defending the capital. Ayame Fujieda recruits Kanna Kirishima in Taiwan, and subsequently Maria Tachibana in New York. In 1920, Ayame recruits Iris Chateaubriand, and the Imperial Floral Assault has their first assignment fighting a demon in Asakusa, Tokyo. Kohran Li, a Shanghai native scientist, also joins the Assault Group but is yet to be introduced to the other members. Back in Sendai, Sakura comes into contact with the Spirit Sword Arataka (霊剣荒鷹, Reiken Arataka) which belonged to her father, and decides to go to the capital.
2	"Act 2: The Cherry Blossom Spirit Attack"; Transliteration: "Dai Ni-maku: Sakura no Hana ni Hanate yo Shinken" (Japanese: 第二幕 桜の花に放てよ神剣)	Takaaki Ishiyama	Hiroyuki Kawasaki	February 25, 1998
3	"Act 3: Spring is March's First Stage"; Transliteration: "Dai San-maku: Haru wa Yayoi no Hatsu Sentō" (Japanese: 第三幕 春は弥生の初戦闘)	Takaaki Ishiyama	Hiroyuki Kawasaki	May 25, 1998
4	"Act 4: A Midsummer Night's Dream"; Transliteration: "Dai Shi-maku: Manatsu no Yume no Yoru" (Japanese: 第四幕 真夏の夢の夜)	Takaaki Ishiyama	Hiroyuki Kawasaki	July 25, 1998

== Home media ==
Sakura Wars: The Gorgeous Blooming Cherry Blossoms was released on VHS in North America by A.D.V. Films in 1999. Spanning 2 tapes, simply titled Sakura Wars & Sakura Wars 2 respectively, with each tape containing 2 episodes. Subtitled and dubbed versions were available.

Sakura Wars: The Gorgeous Blooming Cherry Blossoms was released on DVD in North America by A.D.V. Films Oct 26, 1999 included in Sakura Wars: OVA Collection DVD in 2003 and rereleased Oct 26, 2004. Released on DVD in Spain by Selecta Vision in 2006.
