= Sakura Wars: The Movie =

2001 film by Mitsuru Hongo

- Film poster
- Directed by: Mitsuru Hongo
- Screenplay by: Mitsuru Hongo; Hiroyuki Nishimura; Nobuhisa Terado; Oji Hiroi
- Based on: Sakura Wars by Oji Hiroi
- Produced by: Tetsuo Uchida
- Starring: Chisa Yokoyama; Michie Tomizawa; Urara Takano; Kumiko Nishihara; Yuriko Fuchizaki; Mayumi Tanaka; Maya Okamoto; Kazue Ikura; Ai Orikasa
- Cinematography: Kōji Tanaka
- Edited by: Junichi Uematsu
- Music by: Kohei Tanaka
- Production company: Production I.G
- Distributed by: Toei Company, Ltd.
- Release date: December 21, 2001
- Running time: 85 minutes
- Country: Japan
- Language: Japanese
- Budget: ¥500 million
- Box office: ¥280 million

Sakura Wars: The Movie (Note: Japanese: サクラ大戦 活動写真, Hepburn: Sakura Taisen: Katsudō Shashin) is a 2001 Japanese animated action-adventure film produced by Production I.G and distributed by Toei Company based on the video game franchise published by Sega. Directed by Mitsuru Hongo, and written by Hongo, Hiroyuki Nishimura, Nobuhisa Terado and Oji Hiroi, Sakura Wars: The Movie stars the voices of Chisa Yokoyama, Michie Tomizawa, Urara Takano, Kumiko Nishihara, Yuriko Fuchizaki, Mayumi Tanaka, Maya Okamoto, Kazue Ikura, and Ai Orikasa. A sequel to Sakura Wars 3: Is Paris Burning?, it follows the Imperial Combat Revue's Flower Division as they team up with new recruit Ratchet Altair to defend the division's existence from the schemes of the American Douglas-Stewart company.

Production I.G had previously collaborated with the Sakura Wars developers on cutscenes for the video game series since Sakura Wars 2: Thou Shalt Not Die. The aim was to create an experience impossible to achieve with either the video games or other released media. Production lasted three years, with a budget of ¥500 million. Announced in 1999 alongside Is Paris Burning? and other Sakura Wars anime projects, the film was heavily promoted in Japan. The film was released in Japan on December 22, 2001, where it underperformed at the box office. It was licensed for a North American home media release in 2002 by Pioneer Entertainment, with later releases handled by Funimation. It was praised by critics for its animation and music, but the plot and characters were negatively received.

== Plot ==
In 1926 Tokyo, steam power has become the city's primary energy source. At the Grand Imperial Theater in Ginza, the Imperial Combat Revue's Flower Division–a group of women consisting of swordswoman Sakura Shinguji, lead actress Sumire Kanzaki, Russian ex-soldier Maria Tachibana, French telekinetic Iris Chateaubriand, Ryukyu karate expert Kanna Kirishima, Chinese inventor Kohran Ri, Japanese-Italian aristocrat Orihime Soletta, and German dancer Leni Milchstraße–defends Tokyo against demonic attacks born from negative human elements using the Koubu-Kais, a group of steam-powered mechs, while also maintaining a cover as a theater troupe called the Imperial Revue. Meanwhile, Douglas-Stewart, an American corporation led by Brent Furlong, is determined to make the Flower Division obsolete through the use of Japhkiels, a type of unmanned mecha that are actually demons in disguise.

During the Christmas season, Ratchet Altair, the former leader of Orihime and Leni's failed Europe-based Star Division, arrives from New York City and joins the Flower Division as a new recruit in her efforts to set up a similar division in New York City. (Note: As depicted in the 2005 video game Sakura Wars: So Long, My Love.) Dispatched to fight a fresh demon attack on the city that night, the Flower Division watch some of the demons being taken by the Japhkiels.

After the Flower Division suffers multiple disastrous battles, including one where Orihime and Leni's Koubu-Kai units get destroyed and replaced by their Eisenkleid units, Furlong and Imperial Army officer Haruyoshi Tanuma use their influence to capture the Imperial Combat Revue's commander Ikki Yoneda, seize the theater, and place the Flower Division on indefinite standby as well as their assistant commander Kaede Fujieda and the Moon Division under house arrest. Meanwhile, Furlong's near-immortal henchman Patrick Hamilton tricks Orihime into becoming his accomplice. Investigating Douglas-Stewart, Maria learns about the Japhkiels' true forms and encounters Hamilton, who met Maria during her time as a mafia hitwoman in New York. Despite being seriously injured, Maria flees from Douglas-Stewart.

Meanwhile, Sakura and the rest of the Flower Division launch an assault on the theater to retake their Koubu-Kais, though Ratchet's more violent approach causes friction with Sakura. After they free Kaede and the Wind Division and retake the theater, the Flower Division battles the demons and eventually use the Imperial Capital Barricade Formation to disintegrate them. The Flower Division later battles Orihime and Leni stops Ratchet from killing her in the chaos, allowing the group to free Orihime from Hamilton's control, though Leni and Orihime's Eisenkleids are destroyed in the process. Meanwhile, Moon Division captain Yuichi Kayama liberates Yoneda and destroys the Japhkiel incubation facilities with help from the Imperial Japanese Navy. Kayama attempts to arrest Furlong, but he escapes on a Japhkiel. Merging with the surviving Japhkiels, Furlong overpowers the Flower Division and destroys Ratchet's Eisenkleid in the process. Before Furlong can kill Sakura, Ichiro Ogami arrives in his F2 Koubu from Paris (Note: As depicted in the 2001 video game Sakura Wars 3: Is Paris Burning?.) and reunites with the Flower Division to kill Furlong and the Japhkiels. Yoneda arrests Tanuma, and Maria uses a bullet infused with spirit energy to kill Hamilton.

In the aftermath, the Flower Division and Ratchet perform a musical play based on Kyōka Izumi's The Sea God's Villa. Through the play, Ratchet admits her anxieties following the collapse of the Star Division to Sakura and receives support and forgiveness from the Flower Division. Despite the unscripted deviations, the play is a great success.

== Voice cast ==
Character	Japanese	English (pseudonym in parentheses)
Sakura Shinguji	Chisa Yokoyama	Wendee Lee
Sumire Kanzaki	Michie Tomizawa	Michelle Ruff
Maria Tachibana	Urara Takano	Mari Devon (Jane Alan)
Iris Chateaubriand	Kumiko Nishihara	Carrie Savage
Ri Kohran	Yuriko Fuchizaki	Dorothy Elias-Fahn (Annie Pastrano)
Kanna Kirishima	Mayumi Tanaka	Mary Elizabeth McGlynn (Melissa Williamson)
Orihime Soletta	Maya Okamoto	Melissa Fahn (Tina Dixon)
Leni Milchstraße	Kazue Ikura	Mona Marshall
Kaede Fujieda	Ai Orikasa	Lia Sargent
Ikki Yoneda	Masaru Ikeda	Doug Stone (David Orosco)
Ratchet Altair	Akiko Kuno	Julie Anne Taylor
Ichirō Ōgami	Akio Suyama	Dave Wittenberg (Dave Lelyveld)
Yūichi Kayama	Takehito Koyasu	Steve Blum (David Lucas)
Brent Furlong	Kōichi Yamadera	Crispin Freeman (Joseph McDougal)
Patrick Hamilton	Keiichi Nanba	Richard Cansino (Edward Villa)
Haruyoshi Tanuma	Keiji Fujiwara	Kirk Thornton (Ron Allen)

== Production ==
Sakura Wars creator Oji Hiroi had envisioned making a film based on the Sakura Wars series since the release of the original game in 1996. This wish was greatly magnified after seeing the animation work of Production I.G, which was responsible for producing the anime FMV sequences in Sakura Wars 2: Thou Shalt Not Die. During production of Thou Shalt Not Die and its sequel Sakura Wars 3: Is Paris Burning?, Hiroi and Production I.G each voiced their wish to create a feature-length animated film, but Hiroi did not expect the project to come through. Production began in 1998, after Hiroi had long talks with King Records' Toshimichi Otsuki, who was given permission after positive discussions with Hiroi and series owners Sega and Red Company.

The film was directed by Mitsuru Hongo, who had previously directed adaptations of Outlaw Star and The Candidate for Goddess. Otsuki served as executive producer. Hongo and Hiroi contributed to the script along with Hiroyuki Nishimura and Nobuhisa Terado. Original Sakura Wars scriptwriter Satoru Akahori served as the film's supervisor. The characters were designed by animation director Takuya Saito, based on the original designs by Kōsuke Fujishima and Hidenori Matsubara. The film was produced by Sega, Production I.G, Kadokawa Shoten and Imagica, and distributed by Toei Company. In June 2001, Sega revealed that the film's budget was ¥500 million

Hiroi's wish for the film was to create an experience that neither the games nor other media such as the stage performances had been able to capture. Like their work on Sakura Wars 3, Production I.G used a fusion of traditional 2D animation with 3D CGI graphics in their then-new technique, "Neo-CGI". Hiroi originally wanted the entire project to be of a similar quality to the short cutscenes of Sakura Wars 3, but Production I.G said that it was impossible due to resource management becoming impractical. The original actors for returning characters featured in the film reprised their roles from the video games, including Chisa Yokoyama as Sakura Shinguji and Akio Suyama as Ichiro Ogami. The new character, Ratchet Altair, was voiced and sung by longtime stage and TV drama actress Akiko Kuno. This casting decision fell in line with Hiroi's wish for the Sakura Wars series cast, who had to have experience in voice acting, singing and stage work. Kuno was suggested to Hiroi by actor Shintarō Sonooka, who had worked with Hiroi on the Sakura Wars stage play (in which he portrayed Kosuke Dan) and with Kuno during an earlier period as part of the Shiki Theatre Company. Sonooka's positive comments on Hiroi helped persuade Kuno to accept the role.

=== Music ===
Sakura Wars: The Movie Complete Music Collection

Soundtrack album by Kohei Tanaka
- Released: December 22, 2001
- Venue: Sumida Triphony Hall
- Studios: MIT Studio; ABS Recording; Sound City
- Genre: Film score
- Length: 57:59
- Labels: Avex Mode (Japan); Pioneer Entertainment (North America)
- Producer: Yuji Saito

Regular series composer Kohei Tanaka scored the film. Tanaka composed the film's music between May and June 2001. While previously faced with technical limitations with games and other limits with related productions, Tanaka was able to expand the scope of his music within a film environment. Several themes from the original video games were rewritten for orchestra. Tanaka's friendship with Kuno was a deciding factor in her accepting the role of Ratchet. As part of the audio production, a private performance of the game's score was held at Sumida Triphony Hall on July 8, 2001, and the audience's applause recorded for use in the soundtrack.

The opening theme "Miracle Bell" was sung by the entire main female cast, while the ending musical number "Everything is Into the Sea" was sung by Kuno and Sakura's voice actress Chisa Yokoyama. During the film's recording sessions, Yokoyama was performing in a Sakura Wars stage play of The Sea God's Villa, which was reproduced in the film. Due to performing her role and songs both on stage and in the film, Yokoyama was able to become absorbed in the performance and timing more than she had anticipated. Hiroi wrote the lyrics to the two songs.

The soundtrack album was released by Avex Mode on December 19, 2001, in Japan. The cover design was created by Saito. "Miracle Bell" and "Everything is Into the Sea" were released by Avex Mode as a separate album on November 21, 2001. The soundtrack album was released in North America by Pioneer Entertainment on September 9, 2003.

== Release ==
The film was first announced in October 1999 as part of the "Sakura Project 2000" project. The film was revealed alongside Sakura Wars 3, the first game's anime series adaptation, and the original video animation series Sakura Wars: The Radiant Gorgeous Blooming Cherry Blossoms. During a pre-release screening of the film, Hoir included a joke teaser surrounding a feature focused on the character Iris in the vein of the mahō shōjo series Cardcaptor Sakura. Despite this being a joke, it stemmed from Hiroi's concept for how the series could expand as a media franchise.

The film premiered on December 22, 2001. It was promoted with special campaigns, including a decorated bus related to a special lottery prize for those who spotted it. It was screened simultaneously with three other features: Slayers Premium, Di Gi Charat – A Trip to the Planet and The Very Short Azumanga Daioh Movie.

=== Home media ===
Sakura Wars: The Movie was released by King Records on rental VHS and DVD on April 25, 2002, and on retail DVD on November 22, 2002. The first print edition includes several bonus features including: behind-the-scenes press footage and a booklet detailing unused content. Different retail versions of the special edition featured cover illustrations by Saito and Matsubara. The film was later re-released by Kadokawa Shoten on Blu-ray on January 25, 2013. The limited edition includes illustrations and a booklet.

The film was licensed for a North American release by Pioneer Entertainment and it was released on DVD on September 9, 2003. It came in standard and limited editions, with the latter included a collection of ten mini-pencil boards. In 2013, Funimation acquired the film's distribution rights. They re-released the film on Blu-ray and DVD on October 22, 2013.

== Reception ==
During its first four days in theaters, the film was the seventh highest-grossing release. By February 2003, its box office gross had reached ¥2.8 billion.

The film has received generally mixed reviews from Western critics. Zac Bertschy of Anime News Network gave the film a score of C− for the dubbed version and C for the subtitled version: he called the film "sheer eye candy" and praised its animation and backgrounds. However, Bertschy was critical of the dubbed version, calling the voice work "something of a disaster." Kyle Mills for DVDTalk called the film "predictable" and found the characterizations "boring", but again praised the film's visuals and Japanese audio track. He also said that "fans of the franchise should enjoy this entry." Writing for Anime Herald, Samantha Ferreira called the film a "treat" for fans of the franchise, but complained that the storyline was an "incomprehensible mess" for those unfamiliar with the series. She also praised the characterizations and visuals. Her main feelings was that, while she enjoyed the film, she "can't, and won't recommend this as a starting point."

Kevin Crust of the Los Angeles Times was more critical of the film, calling it "duller-than-dirt" and said "This may have seemed exciting on paper, but with endless exposition, less than riveting characters and visuals that are only intermittently interesting, Sakura Wars the Movie is a bore." Variety's Andy Klein praised the visuals, but frequently questioned how the plot can be hard to follow and said that the film is "unlikely to cross to a more general audience".
