= Sakura Wars: The Radiant Gorgeous Blooming Cherry Blossoms =

1999 original video animation

- Cover of the first VHS

サクラ大戦 ～轟華絢爛～ (Sakura Taisen: Gōka Kenran)
- Created by: Oji Hiroi
- Original video animation
- Directed by: Susumu Kudo
- Produced by: Masahiro Nakagawa; Kazumi Kawashiro; Masaki Sawanobori; Keisaku Okumura (eps 1-3); Yoshifumi Yairita (eps 4-6)
- Written by: Hiroyuki Kawasaki
- Music by: Kohei Tanaka
- Studio: Radix
- Licensed by: NA: ADV Films (2002-2009)
- Released: December 18, 1999 – December 21, 2000
- Runtime: 25–30 minutes (each)
- Episodes: 6
- Related works
- Sakura Wars (game franchise); Sakura Wars: The Gorgeous Blooming Cherry Blossoms (OVA, prequel); Sakura Wars: The Movie (Film, sequel); Sakura Wars (TV series, 1st remake); Sakura Wars: The Animation (TV series, 2nd remake)
- icon

Sakura Wars: The Radiant Gorgeous Blooming Cherry Blossoms (サクラ大戦 ～轟華絢爛～, Sakura Taisen: Gōka Kenran) is a 1999 Japanese OVA produced by Animate Film and animated by Radix. It ran for six episodes and is the second OVA based on the Sakura Wars video games. The episodes were released in VHS, LaserDisc and DVD formats.

It was licensed in North America by ADV Films under the name Sakura Wars: Return of the Spirit Warriors.

== Overview ==
The episodes are six character study episodes about the Imperial Assault Force, taking place during the first two video games.

== Theme songs ==
- Openings
1. "Attack! Imperial Floral Assault Team (Remastered)" (檄！帝国華撃団（改）, Geki! Teikoku Kageki-dan (Kai))
  - Lyricist: Ouji Hiroi / Composer: Kohei Tanaka / Arranger: Takayuki Negishi / Singers: Chisa Yokoyama (Sakura Shinguji), Michie Tomizawa (Sumire Kanzaki), Urara Takano (Maria Tachibana)
  - Episodes: 1, 3, 5
2. "Attack! Imperial Floral Assault Team (Remastered II)" (檄！帝国華撃団（改II）, Geki! Teikoku Kageki-dan (Kai Ni))
  - Lyricist: Ouji Hiroi / Composer: Kohei Tanaka / Arranger: Takayuki Negishi / Singers: Yuriko Fuchizaki (Kohran Li), Kumiko Nishihara (Orihime Soletta), Mayumi Tanaka (Kanna Kirishima)
  - Episodes: 2, 4, 6

== Episodes ==
No.	Title	Original release date	English release date
1	"The Dreadful Assassin from New York" "Nyū Yōku no Ikareru Shikaku" (紐育の怒れる刺客)	December 18, 1999	October 8, 2002
2	"The City of Water" "Mizu no Aru Machi" (水のある都市)	February 25, 2000	October 8, 2002
3	"Earth-shattering Kinema" "Kinema no Kyōtendōchi" (キネマの驚天動地)	April 25, 2000	October 8, 2002
4	"Humanity Kamishibai - Red Boy Forever" "Ninjō Kamishibai - Shōnen Reddo yo Eien ni" (人情紙芝居・少年レッドよ永遠に)	June 25, 2000	November 26, 2002
5	"Father and Daughter and" "Chichi to Ko to" (父と娘と)	September 25, 2000	November 26, 2002
6	"A New Tomorrow for Women" "Onna-tachi no Shin Ashita" (女たちの新時代)	December 21, 2000	November 26, 2002
