= Oji Hiroi =

Japanese author and video game developer

Oji Hiroi (広井 王子, Hiroi Ōji; born 8 February 1954), real name Teruhisa Hiroi (廣井 照久, Hiroi Teruhisa), is an author and video game developer. He co-authored Samurai Crusader with Ryoichi Ikegami. He also created the Far East of Eden and Sakura Wars role-playing video game franchises, and wrote the Sakura Wars manga.

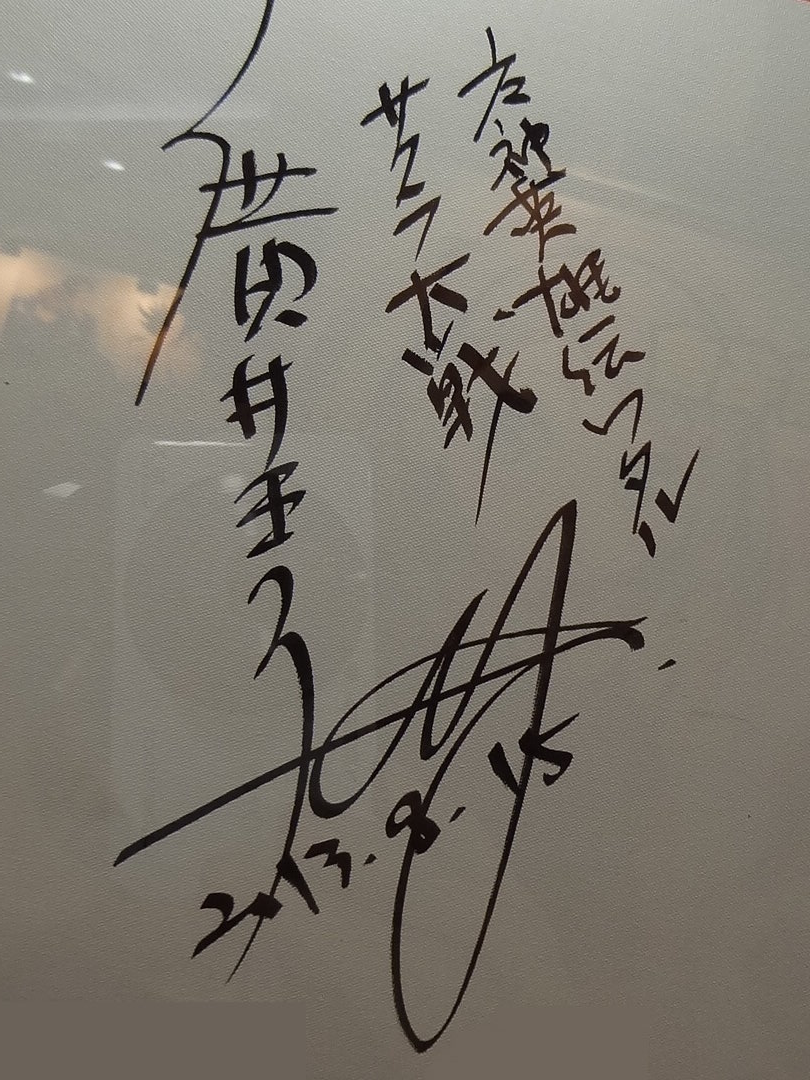
Oji Hiroi's signature

== Original creations ==
- Kita e
- Far East of Eden
- Karasuma Kyoko no Jikenbo
- Kuso Kagaku Sekai Gulliver Boy
- Mashin Hero Wataru
- Madō King Granzort
- Madō King Granzort: Bōken-hen
- Madō King Granzort: The Final Magical Battle
- Moeyo Ken anime series
- Sakura Taisen (manga)
- Sakura Taisen: Ecole de Paris
- Sakura Taisen: Le Nouveau Paris
- Sakura Taisen: Sumire
- Sakura Wars (OVA)
- Sakura Wars
- Sakura Wars 2
- Sakura Wars: The Movie
- Sora to Umi no Aida
- Takt Op.
- Virgin Fleet
