= Sakura Wars =

Japanese video game and media franchise

- Created by: Oji Hiroi
- Original work: Sakura Wars (1996)
- Owners: Sega; Red Entertainment (1996-2016)
- Years: 1996-present

Print publications
- Comics: Mangaban (2002-2021); Sakura Taisen Kanadegumi (2011-2013)

Films and television
- Film: Sakura Wars: The Movie (2001)
- Animated series: Sakura Wars TV (2000); Sakura Wars: The Animation (2020)

Games
- Video games: List of games

Audio
- Original music: Geki! Teikoku Kagekidan (1996)

Sakura Wars (Note: Japanese: サクラ大戦, Hepburn: Sakura Taisen) is a Japanese steampunk media franchise created by Oji Hiroi and owned by Sega. It is focused around a series of cross-genre video games. The first game in the series was released in 1996, with five sequels and numerous spin-off titles being released since then. The series—set during a fictionalized version of the Taishō period—depicts groups of women with magical abilities using steam-powered mecha to combat demonic threats.

The original Sakura Wars was an ambitious title for the then-in-production Sega Saturn. The first game's overlap of the tactical role-playing, dating sim and visual novel genres prompted Sega to classify it as a "dramatic adventure", a moniker which has endured during the series' lifetime. Sega developed most of the games until 2008 with Red Entertainment handling planning and production duties, when the series went on hiatus. Sega rebooted the series because of fan demand with the company handling full creative control. Recurring elements include anime cutscenes created by notable studios including Production I.G, and music by composer Kohei Tanaka.

The series has sold over 5.8 million copies as of 2022, and garnered both critical and popular acclaim. The original Sega console games have been voted among the most popular for the Saturn and Dreamcast. The Sakura Wars franchise includes numerous anime productions, manga, and other media projects such as stage shows. With the exception of So Long, My Love and Shin Sakura Wars, the video game series has not been released in English. Several of the anime series have been localized for English territories.

== Games ==
The first installment was released on September 27, 1996. Many Sakura Wars games have been localized for markets in North America, Europe, Asia, and Australia on numerous video game consoles, personal computers (PC), and mobile phones. As of December 2019, the series includes the main installments from the 1996 Sakura Wars to the 2019 Sakura Wars, as well as direct sequels and spin-offs, both released and confirmed as being in development. Most of the older games have been remade or re-released on multiple platforms.

=== Main series ===
Main series releases
- Sakura Wars (1996); Sakura Wars 2: Thou Shalt Not Die (1998); Sakura Wars 3: Is Paris Burning? (2001); Sakura Wars 4: Fall in Love, Maidens (2002); Sakura Wars: So Long, My Love (2005); Shin Sakura Wars (2019)

The original Sakura Wars was released in 1996 for the Sega Saturn. It was ported to a number of platforms including Dreamcast, Microsoft Windows and mobile devices. A remake for the PlayStation 2 (PS2), Sakura Wars: In Hot Blood, was released in 2003. The remake includes additional voice acting, redone graphics and battle system based on later entries. Its sequel Sakura Wars 2: Thou Shalt Not Die was released for the Saturn in 1998. It was the last title developed for the platform, receiving ports to Dreamcast and Windows, and as a bundle with the first game to the PlayStation Portable (PSP).

The next entry, Sakura Wars 3: Is Paris Burning?, was released in 2001 for the Dreamcast. It was later ported to Windows, and then to the PS2 with Dreamcast-exclusive features redesigned to work on the PS2. Sakura Wars 4: Fall in Love, Maidens was released in 2002 for the Dreamcast. It was the last Sakura Wars game produced for Sega hardware, and was later ported to Windows.

The fifth game, Sakura Wars V: Farewell, My Lovely, was first released for the PS2 in Japan in 2005. It was the first mainline Sakura Wars game to be produced after Sega abandoned game console production. In North America, Europe, and Australia, the game was localized as Sakura Wars: So Long, My Love and published by NIS America for the PS2 and the Wii in 2010; this release removed the number from the title. The sixth entry is a soft reboot of the series, titled Shin Sakura Wars (Sakura Wars in the west). The game carries over multiple elements while featuring a new cast and action-based combat system. It was released for the PlayStation 4 (PS4) in 2019 in Asia, and 2020 worldwide.

=== Spin-offs ===
In addition to the main series, numerous spin-off games covering multiple genres were released. The first spin-off title was Hanagumi Taisen Columns, released for the Saturn in 1997. A sequel for the Dreamcast was released in 2000. A spin-off set just after Sakura Wars for the Game Boy Color, Sakura Wars GB, was developed by Jupiter and released by Media Factory in 2000. A direct sequel was released the following year. A small peripheral titled Pocket Sakura was also developed by Jupiter and released alongside the first Game Boy Color title.

A small group of spin-off titles were developed under the umbrella title Sakura Wars World Project. Sakura Wars Story: Mysterious Paris, a visual novel adventure set after the events of Is Paris Burning?, was released in 2004 for the PS2. A prequel to So Long, My Love, Sakura Wars V Episode 0: Samurai Daughter of the Wild, was also released for the PS2 that year. The gameplay deviated from the main series in featuring hack and slash action. A Nintendo DS dungeon crawler spin-off, Dramatic Dungeon: Sakura Wars – Because You Were There, was developed by Neverland and released in 2008, featuring the casts of all mainline games up to that point.

Other releases included fan discs, supplementary materials related to Sakura Wars and its first sequel, and Sakura Wars-themed pachinko machines. Multiple mobile titles based on the series were also released, beginning in 2001 with Sakura Wars: Keitai Club. Sakura Wars Online for the Dreamcast was released in 2001 with two character packs, one themed after the Tokyo Flower Division and one after the Paris Flower Division. It operated until Sega closed down its servers in 2005.

A mobile game by Sega and Delight Works, Sakura Kakumei ~Hana Saku Otome-tachi~ for iOS and Android devices was announced for a 2020 release in September. The game is set in 2011, (Taisho 100) after a great calamity 16 years earlier, a new combat revue known as B.L.A.C.K. has risen to defend the citizen of Japan from new demon hordes and unravel a deep government conspiracy. Anime studio, CloverWorks produced a short anime for streaming to promote the new game.

== Recurring elements ==
Screenshots of the recurring LIPS system (from Sakura Wars: So Long, My Love) and the recurring ARMS combat system (from Sakura Wars 3)

=== Setting and characters ===
The Sakura Wars series is set during a fictionalised version of the Taishō period, with the chronology currently running from 1923 (Taisho 12) to 1940 (Taisho 29). The games are set in the cities of Tokyo, Paris and New York. The setting combines real locations with fantastical events and steampunk-based technology. The central conflict of the series is between demonic forces created by the ingrained darkness in human hearts. To combat this in Tokyo, the Japanese government created a unit of steam-based mecha called Koubu powered by spirit energy. While a few men are capable of using them, women form the main combat units because of their stronger spiritual power. This group is known as the Imperial Assault Force, based in a theater and working undercover as the Imperial Theater Revue. The group to which the protagonists belong is the Flower Division (Hanagumi), the main combat troop. Other groups make cameo appearances in the story if present.

The first four games follow the military and romantic exploits of Imperial Army officer Ichiro Ogami. Originally assigned to the Imperial Assault Force in Tokyo, he later traveled to Paris and trained the newly formed Paris Assault Force before returning to Tokyo and commanding the two united Flower Divisions during the events of Sakura Wars 4. For So Long, My Love, the lead protagonist was changed to Ogami's nephew Shinjiro Taiga, who is sent in place of Ogami to train the New York Combat Revue. The 2019 soft reboot, Shin Sakura Wars takes place in 1940, twelve years after an event called the "Great Demon War" saw the destruction of all three original Flower Divisions. New divisions were created across the world and began competing with each other, with the newly reformed Tokyo Flower Division being the main protagonists.

=== Gameplay ===
The gameplay of Sakura Wars incorporate role-playing, dating sim and visual novel elements. This blend of genres and styles resulted in it being labeled as a new genre dubbed "dramatic adventure" in its marketing. The original combination of narrative and tactical role-playing gameplay was inspired by the Fire Emblem series. The gameplay is split between adventure-style segments where the player explores environments and interacts with cast members; and battle sections where choices during the adventure segments come into play. With the main female cast, the protagonist can pursue a romance. Romance options can be carried between the first four titles using save data.

Throughout the series, the games have used different battle systems. The first Sakura Wars and its sequel made use of a traditional turn-based battle system on a tilted two-dimensional grid-based battlefield. Each unit has two actions from a selection of five. The sequel expanded the selection to six, and included cinematic attacks. The leader could also issue commands to the entire squad to take specific battle formations. Sakura Wars 3 introduced the "Active & Realtime Machine System" (ARMS), which takes place in three-dimensional battle arenas. Under this system, units have an allotment of Action Points (AP). AP are used up by moving around the battlefield. Units can perform one of six actions, with two actions per turn as in earlier titles. Each unit has special abilities, and attack ranges based on their weaponry. For the 2019 Sakura Wars, the battle system was redesigned to use action-based combat, focusing on free movement within large arenas.

Central to all the games and most spin-off titles is the "Live & Interactive Picture System" (LIPS). During conversations with characters and key story sections, the player is faced with critical choices with an imposed time limit. The concept behind LIPS was to maintain player engagement while making narrative rather than freezing time and allowing prolonged time for thought, a trend the staff found annoying. The most basic version was established in the first Sakura Wars, then later expanded into "Double LIPS" with the incorporation of a personality meter which could indicate a character's feelings towards the player. Between Is Paris Burning? and So Long, My Love, a version called "Analog LIPS" was used. This allowed players to alter the intensity of a single response. It also included interacting with the character and environments. So Long, My Love expanded it further with quick time events using the control sticks and buttons. The 2019 Sakura Wars continues this use of the LIPS system, featuring Analog LIPS and new free-roaming elements. Choices made during LIPS sections directly impact character performance in battle.

== History ==
=== Origins and development ===
In 1990, Oji Hiroi at Red Entertainment (formally Red Company) decided to create Sakura Wars. Hiroi drew inspiration from Japanese stage shows when creating the project, initially titled "Sakura" (桜). Because of a lack of interest from publishers, Hiroi shelved the project until he was approached by Sega vice president Shoichiro Irimajiri to develop a new project for the Saturn. Successfully pitching his project to Irimajiri, the game began production under the title Sakura Wars. While the scenario and gameplay went through multiple redrafts, Sakura Wars always made use of a steampunk setting, a female lead and mecha combat. Development lasted three years, double the original estimate, and was Sega's most expensive project at the time. Many within both Red Company and Sega were skeptical of the game's success, but Hiroi remained confident. Following the critical and commercial success of Sakura Wars, Sega and Red Company expanded the original premise into a franchise, starting with Thou Shalt Not Die. A recurring feature from Thou Shalt Not Die onwards was the use of subtitles drawn from famous poetry or other types of fiction related to a game's location or mood. A recurring poet was Akiko Yosano, whom Hiroi admired.

Following Thou Shalt Not Die, the team moved onto the Dreamcast to develop Sakura Wars 3, rebuilding the game engine and utilising the console's functions for gameplay elements. Following the release of Sakura Wars 3, Sega discontinued the Dreamcast because of declining console sales, transitioning to a software developer and publisher. Rather than move their planned next entry to the PlayStation 2, the team created a final Dreamcast entry as a celebratory title for series fans. This became Sakura Wars 4, which was completed in 10 months as opposed to the usual two year development period of other entries. The original story planned for Sakura Wars 4 was moved for the team's next entry on the PlayStation 2.

In 2005, Red Entertainment split from Sega after it bought back its majority share holding, although it continued to be involved in the Sakura Wars series. The next entry, Sakura Wars V, formed part of a seven-game group dubbed "Sakura Wars World Project"; the aim was to release these games overseas. In the event, only Sakura Wars V was published overseas as Sakura Wars: So Long, My Love, and only three of the other planned games were released. The remaining three titles were cancelled in 2008. Sega and Red Entertainment greenlit Dramatic Dungeon: Sakura Wars in an attempt to revitalise the franchise using a new gameplay genre. In August 2008, Sega decided to end the franchise, with the final Sakura Wars-themed event being a concert that month. Red Entertainment was bought by Chinese company UltaZen in 2011, with Sega retaining the Sakura Wars property. Fan demand eventually persuaded Sega to greenlight a new title in the series, which would both continue the narrative and feature a new cast.

=== Staff ===
All titles from 1996 to 2005 were developed by the same central team. These included screenwriter Satoru Akahori, artists Kōsuke Fujishima and Hidenori Matsubara, director and later chief director Tomoyuki Ito, producer and later executive producer Noriyoshi Ohba, and designer Takaharu Terada. Hiroi had contributed to all the projects as a general producer. While Red handled planning and production, the games were programmed and developed by an internal Sega team which shifted identity over the years—originally known as CS2 R&D during development of the first two Sakura Wars, the team was renamed Overworks in 2000 when Sega consolidated its 9 semi-autonomous subsidiaries into six studios; they worked on the series between Sakura Wars 3 and Sakura Wars V: Episode 0. Sakura Wars: So Long, My Love was developed by the same team as part of Sega's GE2 R&D division, the same team which would develop Valkyria Chronicles. Shin Sakura Wars was developed by a team within Sega's CS2 R&D division, a newer group including Sonic Team. New team members included character designer Tite Kubo, and writers Jiro Ishii and Takaaki Suzuki, all famous names in anime and video games respectively. Hiroi remained in a supervisory role, and also wrote the theme song lyrics.

Other developers worked on the series alongside Sega and Red Entertainment, including Idea Factory, who created the Wii port of So Long, My Love; Jupiter Corporation, producers of the Sakura Wars GB duology and the Pocket Sakura peripheral; and Neverland, who developed Dramatic Dungeon: Sakura Wars. A notable feature of the series is its FMV anime sequences. The first game's scenes were animated by Sega's animation subsidiary, Kyokuichi Tokyo Movie (now known as TMS Entertainment). From Thou Shalt Not Die to Fall in Love, Maidens, they were produced by Production I.G. For So Long, My Love, the scenes were primarily produced by M.S.C. In Shin Sakura Wars, the anime FMV sequences were produced by Sanzigen.

=== Music ===
The Sakura Wars series features a variety of music, and frequently reuses themes. Kohei Tanaka is the chief music composer of the series. Tanaka's first major work in the video game industry, it brought him widespread recognition. Tanaka was among the first to support Hiroi with Sakura Wars, having worked with him during work on an original video animation (OVA) of Tengai Makyou: Ziria. Tanaka acted as a teacher figure for the rest of the development team. At that time, rhythm and percussion dominated Japanese popular music rather than melody. Both Tanaka and Hiroi wanted to reintroduce younger Japanese to beautiful melodies. Tanaka has been involved to some degree in most of the Sakura Wars games, composing the music for all mainline entries, and several spin-off titles. A recurring theme in the series is a piece called "Geki! Teikoku Kagekidan". Tanaka wrote the theme based on Hiroi's request to combine the music of a Super Sentai opening theme with the vocal style of the title song for the film Aoi sanmyaku (1949). Versions of it were included in Sakura Wars 2, Sakura Wars 4, and the 2019 soft reboot of Sakura Wars.

=== Localization ===
While Hiroi wanted the series to be released worldwide, nearly all games in the Sakura Wars series remain exclusive to Asian territories. Early efforts at localizing the series were not undertaken because of Sega's uncertainty over whether the game's blend of genres would find a large enough audience outside Japan to be profitable. An unspecified attempt by Sega to localize the game stalled during the concept approval stage. No official reason was ever given. The PSP ports of Sakura Wars and Thou Shalt Not Die were scheduled for the North American market, but it were canceled. It was later explained that Sony classified Sakura Wars as a text novel, which made then-future licensing for importation and translation difficult.

A Korean translation of So Long, My Love was published in South Korea by Sega in 2006. The PC CD-ROM versions of Sakura Wars and its sequel were localized and released in Russia by Akella in 2006 and 2008 respectively. Dysin Interactive published the PC versions of Sakura Wars to Is Paris Burning? in China, and Fall in Love, Maidens was released in the region by Beijing Entertainment All Technology.

The first official English release in the Sakura Wars series is So Long, My Love, which was translated by NIS America in collaboration with Red Entertainment and Idea Factory. The dub was produced at Bang Zoom! Entertainment, and included actors from NIS America's localization of the Disgaea series. The team also included the Japanese voice track in the PlayStation 2 version, with a dedicated translation which preserved the original character names being created for it. The localization took two years to complete, becoming NIS America's largest localization effort to date. For Shin Sakura Wars, Sega brought on Yakuza 0 translators Inbound Games to localise the game. The localised version uses the Japanese audio with subtitles in other languages, and renames the game with the series namesake only.

== Reception and sales ==
Between the series' debut in 1996 and 2010, the series has sold over 4.5 million copies worldwide. Each entry on Sega hardware rank among the best-selling titles for their respective hardware. The original Sakura Wars was an immediate success, with several stores being sold out of copies within hours of its release. Sakura Wars 2 remains the best-selling title in the series, with over 500,000 copies sold on the Saturn alone, making it one of the console's best-selling titles in Japan. So Long, My Love is the worst-selling mainline entry to date, and was a commercial failure in the West.

Japanese website 4Gamer.net described the series as a "legendary" property connected to Sega, citing several elements such as the anime-style presentation and blend of genres that were hardly seen in gaming at the time. Jenni Lada of TechnologyTell wrote a retrospective on the series in 2009, calling Sakura Wars "an odd series ... that defies genres". In a 1999 IGN article on the franchise following the announcement of Sakura Wars 3, journalist Anoop Gantayat described it as "probably the greatest series of games to never make their way stateside", citing its unprecedented success when compared to other games on Sega hardware at the time.

The series has been popular with both journalists and fans in Japan since the first game's release. At the inaugural CESA Awards, Sakura Wars won the Grand Award, as well as awards in the Best Director, Best Main Character and Best Supporting Character categories. Sakura Wars 2 won the Packaged Work Award at the 1998 Animation Kobe event. The soundtrack album of Sakura Wars 4 won in the "Animation – Album of the Year" category at the 2003 Japan Gold Disc Awards. Prior to release, Sakura Wars was the second most-wanted game in a Famitsu poll in 1996, coming in behind Final Fantasy VII. The first four games all appeared on a public Famitsu poll from 2006 of the 100 best games of all time. A second later poll ranked the Sakura Wars games as among the best on the Saturn and Dreamcast. Sakura Wars heroine Sakura Shinguji was rated in 2009 by Famitsu as the 17th best Japanese video game character.

== Related media ==
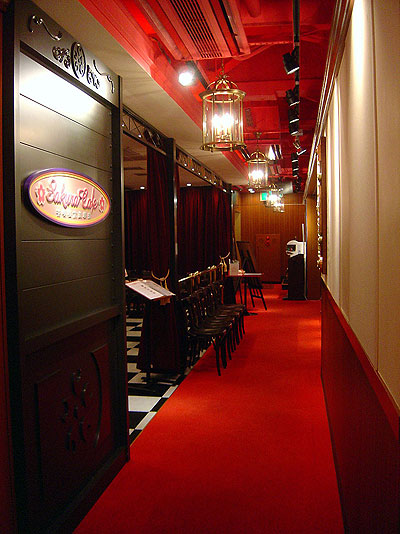
The Sakura Wars series met with considerable success, spawning a multimedia franchise and having its own themed cafe between 1998 and 2008.

Red Company and Sega have expanded the Sakura Wars series into various media. These include anime, manga, stage shows, several light novels, concerts and CD album releases of soundtracks. The latter have met with substantial commercial success. Despite a shared identity, Hiroi took care to keep each of these elements distinct and separate from each other. A dedicated themed cafe and merchandise store based in the Ikebukuro district of Tokyo, Sakura Wars Taisho Romando, opened in 1998. Taisho Romando remained open for ten years until it closed in March 2008.

A prominent feature was an annual stage show dubbed Sakura Wars Kayou Show supervised by Hiroi, for which new musical numbers were created by Tanaka. The show featured the cast reprising their roles and performing stage shows drawn from the series. Each character had songs themed after their characters. The cast, which grew to include those of later games, remained for the entire run with the exception of actress Michie Tomizawa who retired from the series and her role as character Sumire Kanzaki in 2002. Tomizawa appeared as a guest in later revival concerts. The original stage shows ran regularly from 1997 to 2006. Since then, it has seen irregular revivals with both the first cast and later additions. The stage shows were originally meant to end in 2008 along with the franchise, but fan support allowed future revivals. A stage adaptation of the 2019 game was planned to run from March 5–8, 2020 at Sogetsu Hall. However, on February 26, 2020, Sega announced that the event would not take place because of the COVID-19 pandemic. The play will now be postponed to winter 2020 with precautions to protect the spread of the virus.

Hiroi wrote a manga adaptation of the first Sakura Wars, which began serialization in 2002. The original run finished in December 2008, but its popularity led to a second series continuing the narrative. Since 2003, the manga has been published as tankōbon by Kodansha. A comedy manga titled Sakura Wars: Show Theater, which featured comedy skits of characters from each main Sakura Wars location, was serialised between 2005 and 2009, and published by Kodansha in four volumes between 2006 and 2009. A manga adaptation, Shin Sakura Taisen: The Comic, began serialization in 2019 by Shueisha. It was written by Ishii, and illustrated by Koyuri Noguchi.

A spin-off manga Sakura Wars: Kanadegumi was created by Chie Shimada, based on concepts from the Sakura Wars team, and published in the shojo magazine Hana to Yume published by Hakusensha. In contrast to the main series, it was aimed at a female audience and shifted the narrative to a male harem set-up; main protagonist Neko Miyabi is assigned to the titular Kanadagumi, and develops relationships with its five male members. Originally a two-chapter special published between November and December 2011, it was expanded into a full series in February 2012. The manga ran from 2012 to 2013. Between its debut and final issue, the manga inspired both an anime short and a dedicated stage show. It was published in four tankōbon by Hakusensha between September 2012 and July 2013.

=== Film and television ===
Multiple anime films, television series and original video animations (OVAs) have been produced that are based either on individual Sakura Wars games or on the series as a whole. The first was an OVA, titled Sakura Wars: The Gorgeous Blooming Cherry Blossoms. The OVA was released as four 30-minute episodes from 1997 to 1998, following the cast of the first game. A second OVA series, The Radiant Gorgeous Blooming Cherry Blossoms, was released as six 30-minute episodes from 1999 to 2000, relating side stories from between Sakura Wars and the end of Thou Shalt Not Die. Further OVA series based around the characters of Is Paris Burning? and So Long, My Love (École de Paris; Le Nouveau Paris; Sumire; New York, New York) were released from 2003 to 2007. The OVAs were produced by Radix Ace Entertainment until New York, New York in 2007, when production shifted by Anime International Company.

An anime television series based on the first game was produced by Madhouse. The 25-episode series was broadcast on Tokyo Broadcasting System Television from April 8 to September 23, 2000. While based on the first game's narrative and preserving Hiroi's vision, the series changed and added in several events. A major problem was remaining faithful to the source material within a TV format. In 2001, an animated theatrical film, Sakura Wars: The Movie, was released. The film takes place between Is Paris Burning? and Fall in Love, Maidens and features new character Ratchet Altair who would later appear in So Long, My Love. The film was animated by Production I.G; production took three years and was inspired by the wish to expand the series animation beyond what the short cutscenes and OVA projects had achieved. A second anime television series, titled Sakura Wars the Animation and serving as a sequel to the 2019 Sakura Wars, premiered on April 3, 2020. It is animated by Sanzigen, which helped create the animated sequences for the game.

In North America, the first two OVA series and the television series were localised by ADV Films. École de Paris and Sumire were dubbed and released by Funimation, The film was released in North America by Pioneer Entertainment in 2003, and later by Funimation in 2013. Funimation is streaming the 2020 anime for a simulcast release in North America and the United Kingdom.

== See also ==
- List of Sega video game franchises
