= Sakura Wars (TV series) =

2000 TV series based on the video game series

- Official DVD cover for North America.

サクラ大戦 (Sakura Taisen)
- Created by: Oji Hiroi
- Anime television series
- Directed by: Ryūtarō Nakamura
- Produced by: Masao Maruyama
- Written by: Hiroyuki Kawasaki (Note: Uncredited as the series composition writer.)
- Music by: Kohei Tanaka
- Studio: Madhouse
- Licensed by: NA: Sentai Filmworks
- Original network: TBS, MBS, CBC, HBC, TUF, ITV, TBC, SBS, RSK, TYS
- English network: NA: Anime Network; SEA: AXN; US: KTEH
- Original run: April 8, 2000 – September 23, 2000
- Episodes: 25
- Related works
- Sakura Wars (game franchise); Sakura Wars: The Gorgeous Blooming Cherry Blossoms (OVA, alternate story); Sakura Wars: The Radiant Gorgeous Blooming Cherry Blossoms (OVA, sequel); Sakura Wars: The Movie (Film, sequel); Sakura Wars: The Animation (TV series)

Sakura Wars (サクラ大戦, Sakura Taisen), commonly referred to as Sakura Wars TV, is a 2000 Japanese anime created by Madhouse first broadcast on TBS and later on other TV stations. It is based on the Sakura Wars video game franchise by Sega and Red Entertainment.

The series is set during a fictionalized version of the Taishō period where magical abilities sit alongside steam-powered mecha.

The TV series was licensed by ADV Films in 2003 and was released on DVD in six volumes and a box set. In 2009, the series was licensed by Sentai Filmworks.

== Overview ==
The characters and settings are based on the video games, but the story was significantly altered.

== Episode list ==
No.	Title	Original release date
1	"Sakura Arrives at the Capital" "Sakura Teito ni Kitaru" (さくら帝都に来る)	April 8, 2000
2	"The City to be Defended" "Mamorubeki Toshi" (守るべき都市)	April 15, 2000
3	"Sakura's Stage Debut" "Sakura no Hatsu Butai" (さくらの初舞台)	April 22, 2000
4	"The Flower Combat Troop's New Commander" "Kageki-dan no Shin Taichō" (華撃団の新隊長)	April 29, 2000
5	"Dark Shadow" "Jāku naru Kage" (邪悪なる影)	May 6, 2000
6	"The Koubu's Heart" "Kōbu no Kokoro" (光武の心)	May 13, 2000
7	"Tasty Order" "Oishī Chitsujo" (おいしい秩序)	May 20, 2000
8	"This is Revue" "Kore ga Rebyū" (これがレビュー)	May 27, 2000
9	"A Girl Called Cassowary" "Kuwassarī to Yobareta Shōjo" (火喰い鳥と呼ばれた少女)	June 3, 2000
10	"The Kanna that Summons a Storm" "Arashi wo Yobu Kanna" (嵐を呼ぶ女)	June 10, 2000
11	"The Flower Division Training Camp" "Hana Gumi Gasshuku" (花組合宿)	June 17, 2000
12	"Lonely Birthday" "Hitoribotchi no Bāsudē" (ひとりぼっちのバースデー)	June 24, 2000
13	"Bloom Like a Flower! On a Maiden's Pride!" "Hana to Saka se yo! Otome no Iji de!" (花と咲かせよ！乙女の意地で！)	July 1, 2000
14	"Iris Goes Forth!" "Airisu Shutsugeki su!" (アイリス出撃す！)	July 8, 2000
15	"Sakura's Return to her Homeland" "Sakura Furusato e Kaeru" (さくら故郷へ帰る)	July 15, 2000
16	"Anti-Kouma Squad" "Tai-Kōma Butai" (対降魔部隊)	July 22, 2000
17	"Overture" "Jokyoku" (序曲)	July 29, 2000
18	"Cinderella" "Shinderera" (シンデレラ)	August 5, 2000
19	"The Formation to Destroy Evil" "Haja no Jin" (破邪の陣)	August 12, 2000
20	"The Darkness Steals Closer" "Shinobi Yoru Yami" (しのび寄る闇)	August 19, 2000
21	"One More Battle" "Mō Hitotsu no Tatakai" (もうひとつの戦い)	August 26, 2000
22	"The Imperial Theatre, Goes Up in Flames" "Teigeki, Enjō" (帝劇、炎上)	September 2, 2000
23	"Even If My Time to Dream Has Passed" / "Machine of Dreams" "Yumemiru Koro wo Sugitemo" (夢見る頃を過ぎても)	September 9, 2000
24	"Ties" "Kizuna" (絆)	September 16, 2000
25	"Continuation of the Dream" "Yume no Tsuzuki" (夢のつづき)	September 23, 2000

== Reception ==
Zac Bertschy of Anime News Network gave the fourth DVD a D+ for dialogue, a D for Story and animation and a B for art and music.

Theorin Martin of Anime News Network gave the complete TV series collection a C for the dub, a B− for the sub, a C+ for the story, a B for the animation and art and a B+ for the music.

THEM Anime gave the series three stars out of five.
