= Star Ocean: The Second Story (manga) =

Japanese manga series

- Cover of the first volume of the Japanese release of the manga series

スターオーシャン セカンドストーリー (Sutā Ōshan Sekando Sutōrī)
- Genre: Science fiction
- Manga
- Written by: Mayumi Azuma
- Published by: Enix
- Magazine: Monthly Shōnen Gangan
- Original run: 1998 – 2001
- Volumes: 7
- Anime television series

Star Ocean EX
- Directed by: Hiroshi Watanabe
- Produced by: Fukashi Azuma; Tahei Yamanishi; Masahiro Toyozumi
- Written by: Kenichi Kanemaki; Mayori Sekijima
- Music by: Motoi Sakuraba
- Studio: Studio Deen
- Licensed by: NA: Discotek Media
- Original network: TV Tokyo
- Original run: April 3, 2001 – September 25, 2001
- Episodes: 26

Star Ocean: The Second Story (スターオーシャン セカンドストーリー, Sutā Ōshan Sekando Sutōrī) is a seven volume manga series written and illustrated by Mayumi Azuma. Based on the tri-Ace role-playing video game of the same name, it follows the exploits of Claude C. Kenny, a young ensign in the Earth Federation who finds himself stranded on the Planet Expel. He meets Rena Lanford, a young girl living in the village of Arlia who declares that he is the legendary warrior their legends speak of who will save their troubled world from disaster. The series was serialized in Monthly Shōnen Gangan from 1998 to 1999.

Studio Deen adapted the manga series into a twenty six episode anime series entitled Star Ocean EX which aired on TV Tokyo from April 3 to September 25, 2001. The anime series was released to Region 1 DVD by Geneon Entertainment. To complete the story left unfinished by both the manga and anime, five drama CDs were released in Japan, using the same voice actors as the anime series.

== Plot ==
Twenty years after the events of the Star Ocean video game, Ronixis J. Kenny and his son, Claude C. Kenny are on a mission to investigate a newly discovered planet. While investigating a strange machine with a mysterious energy field, Claude finds himself transported to the planet of Expel. He wakes up in a forest, where he meets Rena Lanford, a young girl being attacked by a monster. After defeating the monster with his phase gun, Rena takes him back to her village of Arlia where he is declared to be the legendary "Warrior of Light" who will save Expel. The planet is in peril since the landing of a large meteorite, the Sorcery Globe, which has caused monsters to spawn around the planet, as well as numerous natural disasters such as earthquakes and tsunami.

Claude refuses to accept that he is this warrior, and leaves to try to find someone who can help him go home. In the next town, he learns Rena is in danger from her childhood friend Allen. He rushes to rescue her and finds Allen under the control of a magic crystal. With the crystal destroyed, Allen returns to normal. Realizing the crystal is tied to the Sorcery Globe, and wondering if it can help him get home, Claude decides to travel to El Continent to investigate it and Rena goes with him. Along the way, they meet Celine Junes, a Heraldic Magic user and treasure hunter who tricks the pair into helping her steal the treasure from a cave. The treasure turns out to be a book written in a language none of them knows, so Celine decides to stay with the pair to try to find out more about the book. The group is later joined by Ashton Anchors, another swordsman whom they first encounter in a cave trying to defeat a monster terrorizing a nearby village. Ashton attacks a two-headed dragon, thinking it is the monster, and after he trips the dragon fuses itself to his body, leaving him with the two dragon heads coming out of his back. Ashton makes the group go with him to find the King's Teardrop, blaming them for "distracting him" during his fight and causing everything. After they get there he learns that using the magic power would kill the dragon, so he refuses to do it and joins the group until they can find a way to remove the dragon without causing it any harm.

In the town of Linga, they meet Precis, a young girl inventor who develops a crush on Claude and is oblivious to Ashton being in love with her. They help her cure her friend from a dying illness, and afterward Precis decides to go with them to Lacour where they hope the famous Dr. Leon can answer their questions about the Sorcery Globe and Celine's book.

== Characters ==
Claude C. Kenny
After an accident causes him to wind up on the underdeveloped planet of Expel, Claude rescues Rena Lanford from a monster and is thought to be the "Legendary Warrior of Light" by the residents of the local village. He is now on a quest to investigate the Sorcery Globe, which he hopes will help him return to his own world. Claude has some skill in hand-to-hand combat and picks up swordsmanship fairly quickly, even learning Dias' Kuuhazan attack after seeing it once. Having grown up in the shadow of his famous father, Claude is humble and has a lot of self-doubts, but he grows stronger through his adventures, as does his growing friendship, and love, for Rena. Voiced by: Hiro Yuuki (Japanese); Matt Hill (English)
Rena Lanford
A native of the planet of Expel, she often ventures into the Shingo Forest. One day, a monster appears in the forest and attacks her; she is saved by Claude. In accordance to local legends, she believes Claude to be the "Legendary Warrior". She now accompanies Claude on his quest. Rena is a sweet-natured girl with a pensive, thoughtful side as well as the power to heal. She is devoted to Claude almost from the start, and slowly falls in love with him as the journey comes on. Voiced by: Mayumi Iizuka (Japanese); Nicole Bouma (English)
Celine Jules
A treasure hunter from the village of Mars, she is a powerful wielder of Heraldic Magic, but has a fear of bugs, which is used as a running gag throughout the series. She accompanies Claude and Rena on their journey, but often seems to be more interested in teasing Claude and Rena about their growing love for each other. Voiced by: Mami Kingetsu (Japanese); Venus Terzo (English)
Dias Flac
Dias lived in the same town as Rena and considers her his little sister, though they are unrelated. After his family was killed by bandits, he left Arlia to spend time traveling and training to become stronger. When he finds someone worthy of his skills, he is quick to test their might. As a result of his horrible tragedies, Dias often appears anti-social, rebellious, and spiteful. Voiced by: Takehito Koyasu (Japanese); Brent Miller (English)
Ashton Anchors
Ashton is a swordsman possessed by a two-headed dragon. Ashton himself is noisy and can be clumsy, but he is a capable fighter and can act courageously when the need arises. Regularly plagued with bad luck, people avoided him and he lived a lonely existence. After meeting Claude, Rena, and Celine, who offered him genuine friendship, he claims that they are the reason the dragons are infused with his body as an excuse to travel with them. Though Ashton is angry when he learns Gyoro and Ururun have been taking over his body, when he receives the King's Teardrop that would remove them he can't go through with it because it would cause them die and he is too fond of them. When he meets Precis, he falls in love with her but she only has eyes for Claude. Voiced by: Tomokazu Seki (Japanese); Gabe Khouth (English)
Gyoro and Ururun
Gyoro, the red head, and Ururun, the blue, are the names of the heads of the two-headed dragon that are fused with the body of Ashton Anchors. Though they originally shared one body, the heads are capable of independent thought and are considered separate individuals though they also speak as one. They have the ability to possess Ashton, speaking through him and using his body to fight. Gyoro attacks with fire, while Ururun uses a freezing attack. When Gyoro and Ururun fully possess Ashton, his eyes glow the color of the head speaking and his speech becomes more arrogant to match their personalities. Ashton doesn't remember what happens while he is possessed, and is furious when he learns that they have been doing so. Still, he chooses not to remove them when given the opportunity, because it would kill them. Gyoro is voiced by Takayasu Usui (Japanese) and Trevor Devall (English). Ururun is voiced by Tomoyuki Shimura (Japanese) and Michael Dobson (English).
Opera Vectra
Opera is an adventurous woman who journeys to find her true love, Ernest. Opera, as well as Ernest, are from the planet Tetragenes, and are stranded on Expel. She will go anywhere to find him, just to be near him. Opera is very brave, passionate, and devoted. Voiced by: Rica Matsumoto (Japanese); Willow Johnson (English)
Precis F. Newman
Precis is a young girl inventor from the town of Linga. She is a brilliant inventor capable of putting together contraptions very quickly, but they don't always work the way she plans. She is good friends with a girl named Eleanor, who is inflicted with a fatal disease. To save her friend, Precis goes alone into an area of monsters to get the cure. Precis has a crush on Claude, whom she thinks of as her prince, and is blind to Ashton being in love with her. Voiced by: Tomoe Hanba (Japanese); Tabitha St. Germain (English)
Bowman Jean
Dr. Bowman lives in Linga, and is said to be the most knowledgeable man in town when it comes to medicine. He was once a prestigious professor and connected to the Lacour's researchers. He also knew Leon's parents, but left Lacour while Leon was still a toddler. Voiced by: Yasunori Matsumoto (Japanese); Alistair Abell (English)
Leon D.S. Geeste
A young prodigy in the capital of Lacour, Leon often acts egotistical, vain, and bratty due to the high accolades showered on him. When out of his "safety zone" or faced with a challenge he can't overcome, Leon acts more like the child he is and loses his usual egotism. Voiced by: Kanako Mitsuhashi (Japanese); Reece Thompson (English)
Ernest Raviede
Like Opera, Ernest is from the planet Tetragenes, and is stranded on Expel. Ernest is an archaeologist, and is very passionate about his profession. Though he deeply loves Opera, he can not abandon his job. Though he often leaves her behind while researching, he trusts that she will always meet up with him. Voiced by: Hiroshi Yanaka (Japanese); Trevor Devall (English)

== Media ==
=== Manga ===
Written by Mayumi Azuma, Star Ocean: The Second Story is based on the tri-Ace video game of the same name. It ran in Square Enix's Monthly Shōnen Gangan from 1998 to 2001. Enix published the series in seven collected volumes from June 1999 to November 2001.

No.	Release date	ISBN
1	June 1999	978-4-7575-0029-7
Navigation 1: Deai (出会い...); Navigation 2: Surechigai... (すれ違い...); Navigation 3: Henbō (変貌); Navigation 4: Shuppatsu (出発); Navigation 5: Jomonshōjutsushi (女紋章術師)
2	November 1999	978-4-7575-0130-0
Navigation 6: Te ni Shita Mono wa... (手にしたものは...); Navigation 7: Romansu (ロマンス); Navigation 8: Yochō (予兆); Navigation 9: Kaikō (邂逅); Navigation 10: A feeling lag
3	March 2000	978-4-7575-0196-6
Navigation 11: Mamorubeki Mono (守るべき者); Navigation 12: Sōtō Ryū to Monshō Kenshi (双頭竜と紋章剣士); Navigation 13: Arata na Nakama (新たな仲間); Navigation 14: Haruka Ginga o Koete (遥か銀河を越えて); Navigation 15: Hatsumei Shōjo Purishisu (発明少女プリシス)
4	September 2000	978-4-7575-0311-3
Navigation 16: Ringa no Dai Pinchi (リンガの大ピンチ); Navigation 17: Gakeppuchi no Kyūshutsu Geki! (崖っぷちの救出劇!); Navigation 18: Toraburu Shikaku Kankei? (トラブル四角関係?); Navigation 19: Rakūru Ōkoku (ラクール王国); Navigation 20: Sai...Soshite (再逢...そして)
5	January 2001	978-4-7575-0383-0
Navigation 21: Bugu Taikai Kaisai (武具大会開催); Navigation 22: Ashuton Yami ni Chiru!!...(Shō) (アシュトン闇に散る!!...(笑)); Navigation 23: Sorezore no Omoi (それぞれの想い); Navigation 24: Hofuman Iseki (ホフマン遺跡); Navigation 25: Deai no Ato ni wa... (出会いのあとには...)
6	August 2001	978-4-7575-0524-7
Navigation 26: Rakūru Zensen Kichi (ラクール前線基地); Navigation 27: Shūrai (襲来); Navigation 28: Yami Kara no Shisha (闇からの使者); Navigation 29: Hyōryū (漂流); Navigation 30: Hinan Chiku Nite (避難地区にて); Navigation 31: Kyōsei Tensō (強制転送); Navigation 32: Tōi Futari (遠い二人)
7	November 2001	978-4-7575-0584-1
Navigation 33: Kizuna (絆); Navigation 34: Omoi o Tsumui de (想いを紡いで); Navigation 35: Taiketsu (対決); Final Navigation: Hikari no Yūsha (光の勇者); Navigation 14.1: Tabi wa Michizure Yo wa Okane... (旅は道連れ世はお金...); Navigation 17.1: Mizu no Miyako no Otogibanashi (水の都の御伽話); Another Navigation: Kogouta (孤護唄); Navigation 17.2: Ringa no Machi no Kusuriya-san (リンガの町の薬屋さん)

=== Anime ===
Studio Deen adapted the manga series into an anime series, naming it Star Ocean EX (スターオーシャンEX, Sutā Ōshan EX). The series premiered on TV Tokyo on April 3, 2001, and ran for twenty-six episodes until September 25 of the same year. Movic released to VHS tape and Region 2 DVD across nine volumes, with the first released on July 27, 2001, and the final volume released on March 29, 2002. Each volume contained two episodes, except the final volume which had three.

Geneon Entertainment acquired the license to release the series to Region 1 DVD. They released the six volumes in 2005, from January 4 to November 22. In Geneon's release, the first two volumes contained five episodes each, while the remaining volumes contained four. Geneon released all twenty-six episodes in a series box set in August 2006.

Discotek Media acquired the license to the series, and released it on Blu-ray.

=== Soundtracks ===
Two CD soundtracks were released in Japan by Pony Canyon for the Star Ocean EX series. The first soundtrack, Star Ocean EX Original Soundtrack (スターオーシャンEX ― オリジナル・サウンドトラック), contained forty-seven tracks and released on August 1, 2001. Among the tracks are the TV length versions of the opening and ending themes and background music played during various episodes. The second, Star Ocean EX Original Soundtrack II (スターオーシャンEX ― オリジナル・サウンドトラック II) was released on September 19, 2001. It contained an additional forty-five tracks of background music from the series.

Neither official soundtrack includes the full version of either the opening or ending theme of the series. Amika Hattan did release the full version of the opening theme "To the Light" as a CD single. Likewise, Saori Nishihata released a single with the full version of the ending theme "Hearts".

=== Other ===
Movic, the company which released the Star Ocean EX anime series to VHS and DVD, also had a series of drama CDs produced. These CDs take the place of the series' missing second season and complete the story left incomplete by both the manga and anime series. The CDs feature the same voice actors as those in the anime and each volume contains approximately one hour of dialog. The first CD was released in Japan on July 7, 2001, picking up where the last episode of the anime stopped. The fifth and final volume was released December 8 of the same year.

Enix published two art books for Star Ocean. The first, Treasure: Star Ocean The Second Story Mayumi Azuma Art Book (トレジャー スターオーシャンセカンドストーリー 東まゆみ画集, Torejā: Sutā Ō̄shan Sekando Sutōrī Azuma Mayumi Gashū) was published in October 2000. Spanning eight-eight pages, it includes sixty four pages of color art and a full-color fold out poster created by artist Mayumi Azuma.

The second art book, Second Treasure: Star Ocean The Second Story Mayumi Azuma Art Book (セカンドトレジャー スターオーシャンセカンドストーリー 東まゆみ画集, Sekando Torejā: Sutā Ō̄shan Sekando Sutōrī Azuma Mayumi Gashū) was published in August 2001. It contains sixty pages of color illustrations, twenty pages of black-and-white images and some character profiles.
