= Star Ocean: Blue Sphere =

2001 video game

- Developers: tri-Ace (Game Boy Color); Sonic Powered (Mobile phone)
- Publishers: Enix (Game Boy Color); Square Enix (Mobile phone)
- Director: Yoshiharu Gotanda
- Producer: Yoshinori Yamagishi
- Designer: Akira Takayashiki
- Artist: Mayumi Azuma
- Composer: Motoi Sakuraba
- Series: Star Ocean
- Platforms: Game Boy Color, Mobile phone
- Release: Game Boy Color: JP: June 28, 2001; Mobile: JP: June 8, 2009
- Genre: Action role-playing
- Modes: Single-player, multiplayer

Star Ocean: Blue Sphere (Note: Japanese: スターオーシャン ブルースフィア, Hepburn: Sutā Ōshan: Burū Sufia) is an action role-playing video game developed by tri-Ace and published by Enix for the Game Boy Color handheld video game console in June 2001. It is a spin-off entry in the Star Ocean series, acting as a direct sequel to the 1998 PlayStation title Star Ocean: The Second Story. It was later remade for mobile devices, releasing in 2009.

Blue Sphere is set two years after the events of The Second Story on the planet Edifice, a world currently in a pre-space flight state but holding remnants of an advance civilization. Protagonists from the events of The Second Story are brought down onto the planet by an unknown force, and must work to discover its source and leave. The gameplay carries over multiple Star Ocean elements, including real-time combat and optional side conversations between party members. New elements include item creation tied to the skill system, and local multiplayer options unlock through the Game Link Cable.

Development began in 2000 as a spin-off from the main Star Ocean series, taking approximately one year to complete. Multiple core staff from earlier Star Ocean titles returned, including series composer Motoi Sakuraba. The character designs were created by manga artist Mayumi Azuma. The production period proved difficult for the team, with the programmers collapsing from exhaustion. In addition to tri-Ace, developer tri-Crescendo helped with the sound design. Blue Sphere has garnered a positive reception from journalists, and has sold 130,000 copies in Japan as of 2007.

== Gameplay ==
A battle in Star Ocean: Blue Sphere: the three-strong party face off against a monster encountered during exploration.

Star Ocean: Blue Sphere is an action role-playing game set on the planet Edifice. Navigation of field, dungeon and interior environments takes place from a top-down perspective, while battles are displayed from a side angle. Various actions can be performed in the field, such as jumping or interacting with objects, and taking photographs of enemies in the field outside battle to build up a compendium. Carried over from earlier mainline entries are "Private Actions", optional sequences between characters which improve their relationship with each other and affect their performance in battle.

Battles are initiated when the party encounters enemies in field environments, transitioning to a separate battle arena. Outside battle, the battle party can be organized as the player pleases out of the 12 possible playable characters. The battle system takes place in real-time, with three party members facing a single enemy. Enemies have various body parts that can be attacked separately, and in turn can attack in distinct ways. In addition to standard attacks are character-specific finishing moves which deal high damage to enemies.

Instead of experience points, each battle rewards the party with Skill Points (SP) in addition to in-game currency. SP are collected in a single pool shared between all playable characters, and can be allocated at the player's discretion. SP can be used to increase statistics such as health and magic, or unlock and increase skills related to both in-battle abilities such as character-specific moves; or field actions. These skills are themselves tied to attributes such as Strength and Intelligence, with the types of skills unlocked tied to which attribute has been raised. Skill growth is interconnected with Create Feats, a minigame where new items such as swords, restoratives or other types of items which can be equipped in battle once forged. The types of items forged in Create Feats depend on what skills are active with each character. A local multiplayer option is available: using the console's Game Link Cable, players can fight each other with their parties, or exchange items.

== Synopsis ==
Taking place in S.D 368 (A.D 2454), 2 years after Star Ocean: The Second Story and the defeat of the 10 Wise Men, all the characters have since moved on with their lives. Claude has taken Rena, Leon, and Precis to live on Earth with him. While constantly being sent on missions into space, Claude's relationship with Rena doesn't change much at all. Ashton, Celine, Dias, Noel, Chisato, and Bowman still live on Planet Expel. Ernest and Opera are treasure hunting when their ship crash lands on Planet Edifice. Opera manages to send out an S.O.S. to Precis, who then rounds up the entire gang (sans Claude and Rena, who are on a Federation mission) in her self-built ship and heads to the planet. They are also mysteriously pulled down through the planet's atmosphere and crash-land. They decide to explore their surroundings and search for their missing comrades, hoping that Claude and Rena will rescue them, but they too crash-land on Edifice later on in the game.

== Development ==
Development on Blue Sphere began in 2000, lasting approximately one year. Blue Sphere was specifically designed as a side story within the Star Ocean series, in addition to being a sequel to The Second Story. The decision to create the side story was inspired by the wish to fill the gap between the release of The Second Story and the in-development of Star Ocean: Till the End of Time. The initial scenario had only three protagonists, but this was later expanded to sixteen. As with earlier Star Ocean titles, the setting was primarily based on fantasy with science fiction elements incorporated. The battle system was an entirely original creation, designed to work within the Game Boy Color's limited specifications while retaining the action-based system of the main series. The game uses a four megabyte cartridge, of which a third is used for dungeons.

The character designs were originally going to be created by artist Shinnosuke Hino. He ultimately stepped down early in production, and Mayumi Azuma—who had previously worked on the manga adaptation of The Second Story—was brought in as a replacement. Hino's early work remained in the sprite art. The music was composed by regular series composer Motoi Sakuraba, who created the soundtrack on a PC-9801. Composing for the Game Boy Color presented multiple limitations in chord numbers and quality. The battle theme, "Hand to Hand", was a track Sakuraba particularly remembered, as he tried to capture the momentum of battle despite the limited hardware. The game's sound design received development help from tri-Crescendo. According to producer Yoshinori Yamagishi, the work environment for the production was so harsh that the programming staff collapsed from exhaustion, causing work on the programming to come to a temporary halt.

== Release ==
Blue Sphere was first announced in 2000 by publisher Enix. The publicity was coordinated by Syuichi Kobayashi, a newcomer to Enix who would later go on to act as publicity producer for multiple tri-Ace properties including Star Ocean. It was released on June 28, 2001, and was designed to be compatible with both the original Game Boy and the Game Boy Color. A manga adaptation, written and illustrated by Aoi Mizuki, began serialization in 2002.

Although the game was initially tentatively planned to be released in North America as well as in Japan, by June 2001, immediately prior to the game's release, Enix decided not to localize the game. This was partially due to the size of the game and therefore the difficulty in fitting the translated version onto a cartridge, but primarily due to Enix's change in strategy to focus on the newly released Game Boy Advance rather than the Game Boy Color; the company did not want to release any more GBC games and was unwilling to devote the resources to port the game from the GBC to the Advance.

The game's popularity in Japan, primarily for its story and gameplay systems, prompted Square Enix to remake it for mobile devices. The remake, developed by Sonic Powered, included redrawn graphics and a remastered soundtrack. The latter was handled by Sakuraba. The game was released for NTT DoCoMo's i-mode service on June 8, 2009. Versions for Yahoo! Mobile and EZweb were released on December 16 and 17 respectively.

== Reception ==
Reception

Review scores
Publication	Score
Famitsu	8/10, 8/10, 7/10, 8/10
RPGamer	4/5

In its debut week on sale, Blue Sphere reached the top of sales charts, selling 69,932 units. According to a 2005 report by tri-Ace on its developed games, Blue Sphere had sold 130,000 copies in Japan to that date.
