= Exist Archive =

2015 video game

Exist Archive: The Other Side of the Sky
- Developers: Spike Chunsoft tri-Ace
- Publishers: JP: Spike Chunsoft; WW: Aksys Games
- Director: Masaki Norimoto
- Producers: Yuichiro Saito; Shingo Mukaitoge
- Programmer: Yoshiharu Gotanda
- Artist: Mino Taro
- Writers: Masaki Norimoto; Kentaro Kagami
- Composer: Motoi Sakuraba
- Platforms: PlayStation 4, PlayStation Vita
- Release: JP: December 17, 2015; WW: October 18, 2016
- Genre: Role-playing
- Mode: Single-player

Exist Archive: The Other Side of the Sky is a role-playing video game developed and published by Spike Chunsoft, with assistance from tri-Ace, for the PlayStation Vita and PlayStation 4 video game consoles. It was released in Japan in December 2015 and worldwide in October 2016.

== Gameplay ==
The game is a side scrolling role-playing video game. Many journalists considered it a spiritual sequel to the Valkyrie Profile series of games also by tri-Ace.

== Story ==
The player follows twelve youths who are killed by an explosion in modern-day Tokyo and find themselves on the fantasy-like planet of Protolexa. There are three different endings, based on the player's actions over the course of the game, and some actions affect the game's new game plus mode.

== Development ==
The game was first announced in July 2015, as a collaboration between Spike Chunsoft and tri-Ace in a fourteen-page article in Weekly Famitsu. The game was developed by much of the same tri-Ace staff that had worked on the first Valkyrie Profile game, with assistance from Spike Chunsoft staff as well. Other key staff for the game include character designer Mino Taro of Konami's Love Plus series, and music composer Motoi Sakuraba, composer for tri-Ace's Valkyrie Profile and Star Ocean series. Although it was originally scheduled for release on November 26, 2015, the game was delayed to its final release date, December 17. Shortly after the game's Japanese release, Spike Chunsoft began downloadable content collaborations with some of tri-Ace's other games, including Valkyrie Profile and Star Ocean 5 games. The collaborations, released in March 2016, consisted of character costumes based on character's from the two aforementioned titles, along with a costume to dress up as Monokuma, the primary antagonist from Spike Chunsoft's Danganronpa series of video games.

Until April 2016, no information had been announced in regards to an English language release of the game. NIS America, a frequent publisher for Spike Chunsoft games in English (Danganronpa 1, Danganronpa 2, Danganronpa Another Episode), gave a "no comment" response when asked about localizing the title. Aksys Games acquired the rights to localize Exist Archive and they released an English version in North America on October 18, 2016. Aksys Games released the game in Europe as a digital-only release on September 8.

== Reception ==
Reception

Aggregate score
Aggregator	Score
Metacritic	PS4: 69/100; Vita: 68/100

Review score
Publication	Score
Famitsu	33/40

Famitsu gave both the Vita and PS4 versions of the game a 33/40 rating, with the four reviewers giving the title scores of 8/8/8/9. The game sold 37,398 copies in its opening week in Japan, with 17,414 copies sold for PlayStation 4 and 19,984 copies sold for PlayStation Vita.
