= Star Ocean: Integrity and Faithlessness =

2016 video game

- Developer: tri-Ace
- Publisher: Square-Enix
- Director: Hiroshi Ogawa
- Producer: Shuichi Kobayashi
- Designer: Akira Yasuda
- Programmer: Yoshiharu Gotanda
- Artist: Akira Yasuda
- Writer: Yoshiharu Gotanda Mitsuhiro Nakazawa
- Composer: Motoi Sakuraba
- Series: Star Ocean
- Platforms: PlayStation 4; PlayStation 3
- Release: PlayStation 4: JP: March 31, 2016; NA: June 28, 2016; EU: July 1, 2016; PlayStation 3: JP: April 28, 2016
- Genre: Action role-playing
- Mode: Single-player

Star Ocean: Integrity and Faithlessness (Note: Known in Japan as Star Ocean 5: Integrity and Faithlessness (スターオーシャン5 Integrity and Faithlessness, Sutā Ōshan Faibu Integuriti ando Feisuresunesu).) is an action role-playing video game developed by tri-Ace and published by Square Enix for the PlayStation 4 and PlayStation 3. It is the fifth major installment in the Star Ocean series, following Star Ocean: The Last Hope.

== Gameplay ==
The battle system is similar to other games in the Star Ocean series, with the player controlling one of seven party members in battles, with the ability to switch control of characters. The real-time action battle system features improved game mechanics. The storytelling cutscenes are intended to be interactive and dynamic, and seamlessly transition with the gameplay. Features from previous Star Ocean games such the ability to create items are also present. Enemies are programmed to have a "very complex" AI, with players able to custom configure enemy intelligence to a degree. The game uses "private actions" system of previous series titles, where the story tracks which party members interact during the story to adjust the story's direction.

== Story ==
Star Ocean: Integrity and Faithlessness takes place in S.D 537 (A.D 2623), between Star Ocean: The Second Story and Star Ocean: Till the End of Time, the second and third games in the main Star Ocean series. It is set on the planet Faykreed, 6,000 light years from Earth.

The story begins with a protagonist living on an "undeveloped" planet that is thrown into chaos by first contact with a more advanced space traveling race. Characters include Fidel Camuze, voiced by Max Mittelman in English and Kaito Ishikawa in Japanese, who is the protagonist of the game and a fencer who protects his home village; Miki Sauvester, voiced by Eden Riegel in English and Nao Toyama in Japanese, who is the heroine of the game and Fidel's childhood friend; and Relia, an emotionless and amnesiac girl. The story features multiple endings depending upon user choices.

== Development ==
Star Ocean: Integrity and Faithlessness was revealed to be under development according to an issue of Famitsu from April 2015. The game was developed by tri-Ace, who has developed all other main titles in the series, and published by Square Enix. The game was produced by Shuichi Kobayashi and directed by Hiroshi Ogawa. The characters were designed by Akira Yasuda.

After Star Ocean: The Last Hope, many at Square Enix thought the series was over, due to the games producer Yoshinori Yamagishi being done with the franchise. Because of this, Kobayashi took it upon himself to work on a sequel proposal in secret with the series creator Yoshiharu Gotanda. Kobayashi forced himself to take on the project and worked on the proposal until it was ready, since he feared that a rejection of a sequel would mean the end of the franchise. Kobayashi also wanted to relaunch Star Ocean because he was concerned that the shrinking console market and the continued push by Square Enix and other developers to make simpler games to launch on mobile platforms would make further sequels impossible for less famous franchises.

Kobayashi stated in an interview that he wanted the game to draw its "essence" from Star Ocean: Till the End of Time. The logo is also intended to be reminiscent of the logo for Star Ocean 3 and the project as a whole is meant to reassure fans that the developers are still committed to the series.

The game was developed primarily for the PlayStation 3, with the PlayStation 4 version as a port. The PlayStation 3 version of the game was not released outside Japan due to the very small PlayStation 3 market remaining outside Japan. As to why the game was being developed for PlayStation 3 and PlayStation 4, Kobayashi said that the focus was on getting the game to fans of the original games, and that meant delivering the game to those consoles. Technical differences exist between the two different console versions, with the PlayStation 4 achieving higher framerates and resolution than the PlayStation 3 version. The PlayStation 3 release was moved back from the original launch date by several weeks to give more time for optimization for the game systems hardware.

Also in consideration of the series' aging fanbase, the protagonist Fidel was made to be 23 years old instead of a teenager to be more relatable to the games audience. Kobayashi said that downloadable content was a possibility, but traditional console players would prefer more work on the game or its sequel instead. The game producers altered the character Miki's clothes (which in this case was her underwear) to make her outfit more conservative in anticipation of backlash from western audiences against teenagers in sexually provocative clothing. Other localization adjustments were made during the quality assurance testing included a moment where Miki meets Relia, a younger girl, and reassures her by patting her on the head; this gesture, however, did not register positively internationally and was modified.

A large focus of the game was on making it "seamless", such as smooth transitions between gameplay and combat, eliminating random encounters with enemies, as well as perfecting the angling of the in-game camera to automatically go to the best spot for players to see their enemies during combat. The development team was guided by the principle that gameplay should not be interrupted unless it is necessary. Also part of the seamlessness was the reduction in cut scenes to keep the narrative more cohesive and focused on the gameplay experience.

When asked about the possibility of a Microsoft Windows version of the game, producer Shuichi Kobayashi explained that porting the game would likely be easy due to the ASKA engine tri-Ace used to develop the game but that they were having difficulty trying to find a way for players without a controller to play the game. Due to this they decided to delay a possible PC release. Despite this, a PC port has yet to be released, leading to the possibility of it being cancelled, likely due to low sales or reception.

== Reception ==
Reception

Aggregate score
Aggregator	Score
Metacritic	58/100

Review scores
Publication	Score
Destructoid	6/10
Famitsu	34/40
Game Informer	5/10
GameSpot	5/10
GamesRadar+	2.5/5
IGN	5.8/10
Polygon	5/10

Star Ocean: Integrity and Faithlessness received "mixed or average" reviews, according to video game review aggregator Metacritic. IGN notes that the graphics varied widely in quality, from very high quality to Minecraft and noting there were no cutscenes, so the acting had less emotional impact. They did however praise the game's score and cast of characters. Destructoid also missed having cutscenes due to character dialogue being unskippable and the adjustable cameras sometimes missing the characters facial reactions. Combat was praised as being smooth and manageable even when the players party grows to seven characters. Game Informer stated that the characters were cliche and underdeveloped, with long dialogue sequences looking at "nothing except the backs of your party members' heads". Further addressing the dialogue, GameSpot decried its poor quality and lack of clear reasons why the protagonists decide to join forces. They also noted how the same enemies reappear in the same locations, making travel across the large game world difficult. GamesRadar praised the fast-paced arcade like combat and a likable cast, but noted the seeming low production values, leading to dialogue filling in for seeing events like space battles and taking away the expected excitement. While they complimented the combat system, they noted that the player's characters have no spatial awareness which hinders players strategizing. Polygon stated that the most frustrating part of the game is believing there will be extensive sections of the game and story occurring in space, but then finding that is not the case.

=== Sales ===
The PlayStation 4 and PlayStation 3 versions of Star Ocean: Integrity and Faithlessness sold a combined 175,000 copies in Japan as of September 2016.
