= Star Ocean: Anamnesis =

2016 video game

- Developer: tri-Ace
- Publisher: Square Enix
- Director: Hajime Kojima
- Producer: Shuichi Kobayashi
- Designers: Ryoko Mizuno; Tatsuo Miyoshi; Yuji Nohara
- Programmer: Hidenori Iwakiri
- Artist: Akira Yasuda
- Writer: Mitsuhiro Nakazawa
- Composer: Motoi Sakuraba
- Series: Star Ocean
- Platforms: Android, iOS
- Release: JP: December 7, 2016; WW: July 10, 2018
- Genre: Action role-playing
- Modes: Single-player, multiplayer

Star Ocean: Anamnesis (Note: Japanese: スターオーシャン：アナムネシス, Hepburn: Sutā Ōshan Anamuneshisu) was a free-to-play role-playing video game developed by tri-Ace and published by Square Enix for Android and iOS devices. It was created in celebration of the Star Ocean series' 20th anniversary, and featured characters from all previous titles in the franchise, as well as music from series composer Motoi Sakuraba. The game was released in Japan in December 2016, and worldwide in July 2018. The global version of the game was shut down in November 2019, and the Japanese one in June 2021.

An offline version is available with the first three episodes and acquired character models, but with only a limited number of collaboration characters.

== Gameplay ==
Star Ocean: Anamnesis is a role-playing game featuring three-dimensional characters and environments. Players could participate in real-time battles against enemies that supported up to four players.

== Plot ==
Set in S.D 539 (A.D 2625), the players controlled the captain of the Pangalactic Federation starship GFSS-3214F, which was exploring deep space following the events of Star Ocean: Integrity and Faithlessness two years earlier. After a surprise attack by pirates, the entire crew jettison the vessel in escape pods while the captain stays on board with only the AI robot Coro (voiced by Ryūsei Nakao). Making the decision to activate the ship's hyperspace drive, the warp fails and ends up sending them to a distant region of space outside the Federation's borders. While investigating a seemingly barren planet, they happen upon a mysterious woman being chased by a monster. The woman, named Evelysse (voiced by Sumire Uesaka), uses a powerful form of Symbology magic that allows her to summon warriors from throughout time, and manages to escape with the aid of her time-warped allies. After she joins the captain back on the ship, the course is set to return home to the incredibly distant Earth.

== Development ==
In October 2016, Square Enix launched a website teasing Star Ocean: Anamnesis for iOS and Android devices, and that it would feature characters seen in previous installments in the series. The company later launched an official website for the game providing the first details, preview trailer, and a release date of 2016 in Japan. A representative on the game's official Twitter account later announced that it would feature "full 3D real-time action battles" and "HD graphics". The game was meant to coincide with the series' 20th anniversary.

Producer for Square Enix Shuichi Kobayashi has stated that tri-Ace's Aska game engine, as well as backgrounds, texture and other character model data from Star Ocean: Integrity and Faithlessness were used as a base during the early phases of the game's development. As with the other games in the Star Ocean series, the game's soundtrack was composed by Motoi Sakuraba, and features artwork by Akira Yasuda, character designer for Star Ocean: Integrity and Faithlessness. The game's theme song is "Dakara Boku wa Fukou ni Sugatte Imashita" by the band Kami-sama, Boku wa Kidzuite Shimatta. The game was localized in English and released on July 10, 2018. The English version of the game was discontinued on November 5, 2019, and the Japanese version on June 24, 2021. The game featured crossover events with Valkyrie Profile, Resonance of Fate, Final Fantasy Brave Exvius, Infinite Undiscovery, Nier: Automata, Radio Ocean, Sakura Wars, Attack on Titan, Radiata Stories, Guilty Gear, Tales, Gunslinger Stratos, Million Arthur, and the Persona series.

== Reception ==
Kotaku described the game as "exploitative but charming", praising the game's use of nostalgia, but abhorring the "blandness" of its free to play formula.

By December 2016, Anamnesis had over three million downloads.
