= Star Ocean: The Last Hope =

2009 video game

- Developer: tri-Ace
- Publisher: Square Enix
- Director: Mitsuo Iwao
- Producers: Yoshinori Yamagishi; Hajime Kojima
- Programmer: Yoshiharu Gotanda
- Artist: Katsumi Enami
- Composer: Motoi Sakuraba
- Series: Star Ocean
- Platforms: Xbox 360, PlayStation 3, PlayStation 4, Windows
- Release: Xbox 360: JP: February 19, 2009; NA: February 23, 2009; AU: June 4, 2009; EU: June 5, 2009; PlayStation 3: JP: February 4, 2010; NA: February 9, 2010; AU: February 12, 2010; EU: February 12, 2010; PlayStation 4, Windows: WW: November 28, 2017
- Genre: Action role-playing
- Mode: Single-player

Star Ocean: The Last Hope (Note: Known in Japan as Star Ocean 4: The Last Hope (スターオーシャン4 THE LAST HOPE, Sutā Ōshan Fō Za Rasuto Hōpu).) is a 2009 action role-playing video game developed by tri-Ace and published by Square Enix for the Xbox 360, and the fourth installment in the Star Ocean series. The game's battle system features four party members, and is more team-oriented. It also features more of a sci-fi emphasis than past titles with the ability to control the player's ship. The ship is able to land on at least 5 planets or other space-based destinations. Players are able to travel through the "star ocean", jumping across planets. The game takes place a few centuries before the original Star Ocean, and revolves around Edge and his crew combating a mysterious threat called the "Grigori".

An international version of the game was released by Square Enix for PlayStation 3 in February 2010. Officially known as Star Ocean: The Last Hope International, the game contains both Japanese and English voices as well as new content that is exclusive to it. A remastered version was released for PlayStation 4 and Windows in November 2017.

== Gameplay ==
The Last Hope utilizes the same real time battle system like previous games in the series, but new features include a new Rush Gauge and Blindsides. The Rush gauge allows players to perform a preemptive strike against their opponent or use a special ability or attack. Each character will have and utilize their own individual Rush gauge. Blindsides allow the player to counterattack an enemy who is targeting the player by slipping behind the enemy quickly out of their line of sight and launching a preemptive strike on the enemy from their back. One noteworthy change in the system is the number of characters that can be controlled and fought with in battle returning to four, as in the first two Star Ocean games (it was limited to three in the previous title, Star Ocean: Till the End of Time).

Edge, Faize, Reimi and Lymle attacking enemies in Star Ocean: The Last Hope International.

A new feature in The Last Hope is allowing the player to take the role of captain of the spacecraft, the SRF-003 Calnus, which has been sent to scout new frontiers by the USTA. The Calnus possesses a flight deck where the player can select which planet he would like to fly to, a recreation room where the player's teammates can hang out and interact with one another as well as a conference room where the player gathers with the crew to come out with new ideas for Item Creation. The battle arena contains the battle simulator, a feature from previous games such as Star Ocean: Till the End of Time, which allows the player and his teammates to practice combat. The crew's quarters allows the player to choose which characters share the same room, and the correct pairings can lead to special actions between characters known as Private Actions.

The Private Action system (often shortened to PA) is a feature that returns from previous games, where the main protagonist, Edge, can interact with his teammates. PAs consist of actions such as conversing with them during rest after exploration or battle, the player can form a rapport with him/her, which increases the member's affection or respect for the main character. Choosing the correct choices during actions would unlock special events or cutscenes between Edge and the team member. Placing characters in the same room also builds up rapport and unlocks even more PA events. If a member is severely injured in battle, a special "Rage" mode can be unlocked which allows close members to attack enemies with more power. PAs are also able to change the ending of the game with different cutscenes being shown, there are a total of about 100 PAs which can be unlocked in the game.

The game features a gameplay mechanic called the "Battle Enhancement Attribute Type" (BEAT), a system which allows the player to choose the preferred type of fighting styles of team members, such as their offense, defense and sneak attacks. As combat experience increases, the team can achieve higher combat rank statuses, which unlock advanced styles, known as Action Upgrades.

== Story ==
=== Setting ===
The Last Hope is a prequel to the original Star Ocean and takes place on Earth in S.D. 0010 (A.D. 2096), where the world is on the brink of destruction. In A.D. 2064, World War III broke out after several clashes between the World Republic Federation, the ruling government body on Earth, and its enemies around the world. Weapons of mass destruction were utilized by both factions of the war without hesitation, razing the lands on Earth. The declining situation lead the people to believe that the end of the world was nearing, but the critical situation forced both factions to declare a ceasefire. In the aftermath of the war, most of the Earth's population has been killed and the natural environment was deteriorating at an alarming rate.

The surviving population of mankind were forced to live in the confinement of underground cities and the countries banded together to form a governing body known as the Greater United Nations in A.D. 2065. The Universal Science and Technology Administration or USTA was established by the Greater U.N, its mission was to locate a new home planet for mankind in the far reaches of outer space. In S.D. 0001 (A.D. 2087), the first year of the newly established Spacedate calendar, Professor Trillas Bachtein succeeded in his Subspace warp drive experiments which was a breakthrough in space travel. That same year, the USTA secretly put in motion its Space Reconnaissance Force or SRF project which would then in S.D. 0010 send the first human expedition into outer space to locate a suitable planet for the relocation of mankind.

=== Synopsis ===
Edge Maverick is a member of the Space Reconnaissance Force (SRF). Along with childhood friend Reimi Saionji, he embarks on the first interstellar travel conducted by humanity to discover other hospitable worlds and possibly another home for humanity. Edge's best friend, Crowe Almedio, is a Captain in the SRF and is also assigned on the mission. Departing the Lunar base, Reimi and Edge are assigned as crew members on board the "Calnus", while Crowe is given command of the "Aquila". Shortly after launch, the ships shift into hyperspace, but there is a meteor shower in the middle of the path and all ships, except the Aquila, crash-land on the planet Aeos. The Captain of the Calnus, Grafton, gives Edge and Reimi the assignment of exploring the planet and searching for the other ships. While searching, the two discover a downed SRF ship and a dying crew member. He warns the two about a meteor fragment his team collected, saying that he had to kill his team because of it. Shortly after, a large monster materializes. With the help of an unknown man, they defeat the creature. The man introduces himself as be Faize Sheifa Beleth, an Eldarian and an ally of Earth. The trio head back to the Calnus, where a large base has been built by the Eldarians. It is revealed that the Eldarians and Earth have been allies for several years, and the Eldarians actually gave Earth the interstellar travel technology. With a lot to clean up, Captain Grafton gives command of his ship to Edge, with Reimi and Faize accompanying him. With a repaired Calnus, the trio head outward.

With the help of SRF operator Welch Vineyard, the trio continue the mission of exploration. They head to planet Lemuris and begin exploring. The group meet Lymle Lemuri Phi, a little girl and grand daughter of the village elder, Ghimdo, who is suffering from an illness that's slowly turning him to stone. The group eventually discover a crashed alien ship and also discover the source of the illness. The alien ship is revealed to be a Cardianon ship, who were using the populace to experiment on. Lymle joins the group and they head off to the Cardianon mothership, as the Cardianon have no homeworld. On the mothership, they discover more experiments turning the Cardianon into monsters, using these strange energy stones they call "Epiphanies of Guidance". Eventually meeting up with Morphua cyborg Bacchus D-79, the group flee the ship as it begins to hyperjump into an unknown section of the galaxy. The group agrees that they need to return to homebase and inform the Eldarians, Morphus, and Earth of the Cardianons' experiments. While attempting to hyperjump, the group are trapped in a strange vortex and land on an unknown planet.

After some initial exploration, the group determine that they somehow landed on Earth in the year 1957. Not knowing how they traveled through time, they determine the best course of action would be to leave, but they are too late, as the government have captured the Calnus and Reimi. Meeting up with a scientist named Klaus Bachtein, the group are told that they are in New Mexico. They are also told that Klaus used to work for the government, in a base dedicated to investigating extraterrestrials. The group devise a plan, using Bacchus' cloaking ability, Klaus will pretend to "capture" the extraterrestrials. Once inside the facility, the group meet Meracle Chamlotte, a cat-like humanoid who has been imprisoned for several years. Meracle joins the group, who promise to help her escape. Upon running into Commander Milla, revealed to be Klaus's wife, Edge is given a choice. He can either fight his way out, killing several people, or allow them to use his ship's superior technology to help the Earth make advancements. Edge agrees, only to be double crossed by Milla, who uses the Calnus's power source to power an experimental device of hers. Disheartened, Edge and company are imprisoned in Reimi's cell. Klaus manages to break them out, and the group manage to escape as the device destroys the whole Earth in a huge explosion, expelling the Calnus back to their time period.

Bacchus deduces that, since Edge and Reimi are still alive, they were in an alternate Earth. Despite that, Edge is distraught over the massive loss of life that he credits to himself, having enabled Milla. Deeming Edge unfit, Reimi takes command, and the group land on the planet Roak to explore and gather supplies. Edge continues to have trouble with his decision, which hinders the group's exploration. The group meet a local tribeswoman and rescues a Featherfolk named Sarah Jerand from kidnappers. The team discover that a mysterious cult has been kidnapping people and are asked to consult with the local seer Eleyna Farrence. Sarah is kidnapped by the cult again. The group run into Myuria Tionysus, another Morphus who believes Crowe to have killed her husband, Lucien. She forces herself into the group. Eleyna tells the group that the cult is meeting in a tower called "The Purgatoriam", and also helps Edge move on from the Earth tragedy. Entering the tower, the group fight to the bottom and encounter the cult leader Tamiel. The group defeats him, and Edge saves Sarah. Faize is grief-stricken when he discovers that the cultists have slaughtered the tribe that helped his group earlier.

Edge has come to terms with the alternate Earth situation, and takes command once again. Bacchus reveals his mission, to eradicate items known as "The Grigori", objects that force evolution and mutation in animals (it is revealed that several of the game's bosses have encountered these items and were mutated). Welch contacts the group with information that the Aeos command center has stopped communications and orders the group to investigate the situation. The group head back to Aeos Command Center, which has been attacked by a mysterious force and destroyed. Eventually the team run into ships and troops that appear to be SRF. Myuria explains that they are enemies known as "Phantoms". Eventually, the group is rescued by Crowe and an Eldarian, Arumat. Crowe reveals to Myuria that he tried to save Lucien, who was shot down by a Cardianon ship. He also tells the group that he has abandoned his mission and is seeking to destroy the "Missing Procedure", the source of the Grigori. Arumat proceeds to explain how the Eldarian homeworld, Eldar, was attacked and destroyed by the phantoms, prompting Faize to join Crowe while Arumat heads on with Edge. Crowe heads to space, where he engages hostile phantom ships in an attempt to save and protect the Eldarian refugees. Helplessly, Faize watches as one after another, Eldarian refugee ships are shot down and destroyed. Unable to continue watching the scene unfold, Faize enters his Sol to join the combat to Crowe's dismay.

Edge's team destroys the Grigori on Aeos and convince Arumat to join them. Bacchus informs them to head to the Morphus homeworld, En II, where the group learn that the Missing Procedure is an entity that lives in another dimension and that, if left unchecked, will consume their dimension. The planet is then attacked by the Phantoms and the group successfully defends the planet. As the Calnus is transformed into a warship, Edge has misgivings of abandoning his mission. Although he knows he is fighting for what is right, he feels discouraged in seeing the Calnus, a once peaceful exploration vessel transformed into a warship. The group is informed that the Missing Procedure itself is nigh impossible to destroy. They soon discover a source dubbed the "Nox Obscurus" that amplifies the energy corrupted by the Grigori and feeds it back to the Missing Procedure, which in turn produces more Grigori. The group formulate a plan to destroy the Nox Obscurus, and destroy the entity. The combined force of the Morphus armada and Earth fleet attacks Nox Obscurus, which defends itself, resulting in the destruction of the Earth Lunar base. Crowe reveals himself to be alive, and sacrifices himself to take down Nox Obscurus's external security measures, allowing the Calnus entry. Inside, the group learn that the Cardianon mothership composes most of the structure, with many of the monsters inside creations that it has come up with. After traversing several layers, the group enter the Palace of Creation and meet the Apostle of Creation. The Apostle tells them that their assimilation is inevitable, and to stop fighting. Upon his defeat, he is revealed to be Faize, having given into the Procedure and assimilated. Faize is assimilated into a monstrous being and fights the group once more.

The monster is defeated, and the moon begins to crumble. Not willing to leave Faize behind, Edge attempts to rescue him, but both fall into a dimensional portal. Edge awakens floating in a separate dimension, where Crowe and Faize tell him they are fine and will always be looking after him. Edge happily reunites with everyone back in his own dimension aboard a USTA spacecraft. Commander Gaghan of the Eldarians reveal that Lymle's homeworld, Lemuris, was the planet that they had sought for many years and where some of their ancestors had migrated to long ago. Thus the inhabitants of Lemuris and the Eldarians shared common ancestors and they planned to colonize and make Lemuris their new home. Commander "Lightspeed" Kenny offered Edge and Reimi the opportunity to travel to other planets and spread their technology to create a more peaceful universe. Edge gives a passionate speech about how their actions were exactly as the same as the Missing Procedure and how giving advanced technology to civilizations that were not ready for it would only spell disaster. The Morphian representative concedes that Edge is correct about his argument and the Morphus would continue to monitor the Missing Procedure without interfering with other lifeforms in the galaxy. The Eldarians also agree and decide that once on Lemuris, they would strip themselves of their advanced technology and begin anew. The humans were left with what they knew of Eldarian technology and were left alone to advance at their own natural pace.

Edge's crew disbands and each member returns to their respective homes and families. Faize manages to return from the other dimension and finds Lymle talking to the stone remains of her grandfather. Myuria goes on to find her own happiness and Bacchus undergoes a procedure to becoming flesh and blood again to be with his wife. Arumat becomes a wanderer through space, protecting those he encounters. Meracle returns to live with Eleyna and Sarah is finally able to fly. Crowe washes up on the shores of Roak and is implied to have married Eleyna soon after. Edge and Reimi, once again the only two passengers aboard the Calnus mach II, head off with expectations of one day meeting their old comrades and with excitement of exploring the great Star Ocean.

== Development ==
Star Ocean: The Last Hope was originally announced at the "Star Ocean Special Stage" at the 2007 Square Enix Party as the tentatively titled Star Ocean 4 with no platform. An Xbox 360 release was revealed during the 2008 Xbox 360 RPG Premiere. In a special interview with Xbox Japan, weeks before the game's release, game producer Yoshinori Yamagishi revealed that the team began planning out Star Ocean: The Last Hope immediately after they finished developing Star Ocean: Till the End of Time, so actual development time took about 5 years. The game uses an improved version of the game engine used in Infinite Undiscovery. He also mentioned that the biggest problem the team encountered while creating the game is capacity, as making a RPG on a seventh-generation console requires vast amounts of data and coding thanks to the complexity of graphics and animations. The game also runs at a constant 60 frames per second. Pre-rendered movies are done by a collaboration between tri-Ace and Visual Works, while character design and illustration (only in the Japanese version) is handled by Katsumi Enami, best known for his illustration work in the light novel and anime series Baccano!.

When asked whether the title would release on the PlayStation 3, Square Enix producer Yoshinori Yamagishi replied that the title will be first released on the Xbox 360, but the PS3 version was undecided. Square Enix and The Last Hope's development team later said that there were no plans for a PS3 version. In an interview, Yamagishi said that Xbox 360 was the first seventh generation console to come out, and its "extremely well-made hardware", from a developer's standpoint, as the reasons why he choose it to develop Star Ocean: The Last Hope on. In a test play session held for Microsoft Japan employees and some prominent bloggers, when asked if Star Ocean: The Last Hope follows after Star Ocean: Till the End of Time's plot twist, Yamagishi revealed in a Q&A session that the world of SO4 exists in a parallel universe from the one in the first three Star Ocean games. When asked if tri-Ace will remake the first three games on a new generation console, Yamagishi stated that he would rather work on a new sequel to Star Ocean than develop remakes, as the development time for them would be very consuming. Since then Yoshinori Yamagishi has stated that he finished with Star Ocean after achieving all he set out to do with the series.

Star Ocean: The Last Hope International was released in February 2010 for PlayStation 3 on a single Blu-ray disc. It contains additional content not found in the Xbox 360 version, such as dual voices (Japanese and English), original illustrated character portraits for dialogues, and multiple new soundtracks.

A remastered version of the game for PlayStation 4 and PC with 4K support (PS4 Pro) was released worldwide in November 2017 as a digital only download.

== Music ==
The music for Star Ocean: The Last Hope was composed by Motoi Sakuraba, who has worked on the soundtrack for the previous Star Ocean games and many other games developed by tri-Ace. The soundtrack will be released in two parts:

- Star Ocean: The Last Hope Original Soundtrack - a 3-CD set containing all the music tracks in the game, with a total of 71 tracks. It also contains a DVD extra of an interview with Sakuraba himself, plus video footage of his workshop and some original music performed by him.
- Star Ocean: The Last Hope Arrange Soundtrack - a selection of tracks from the original soundtrack performed in different remixes.

== Reception ==
Reception

Aggregate score
| Aggregator | Score |
|---|---|
| Metacritic | X360: 72/100; PS3: 74/100; PS4: 72/100 |

Review scores
| Publication | Score |
|---|---|
| Famitsu | 34/40 |
| Game Informer | 7.0/10 |
| GamePro | 4/5 |
| GameSpot | X360: 7.5/10 |
| IGN | X360: 8.0/10 |
| Official Xbox Magazine (US) | X360: 8.5/10 |
| TeamXbox | X360: 8.5 |
| X-Play | 4/5 |
| Blast | 8.4/10 |
| PC Advisor | 4/5 |
| PixlBit | 4/5 |

Famitsu awarded the game a total of 34/40, composed of a 9/9/8/8 score.

Overall, the game was better received than Square Enix's other early seventh generation RPGs such as Infinite Undiscovery and The Last Remnant, both of which had mixed reviews from critics. IGN awarded the game a score of 8.0. In its review, IGN said that despite the rough pacing in the storyline that could be told in a much more engaging manner, tri-Ace and Square Enix's latest RPG holds together quite well with action-packed gameplay. One of the small annoyances encountered during the game is the disc-swapping, which requires players to switch discs if they need to travel between planets later in the game. The review also feels that the Japanese voice track should have been included as an option in the North American version, as the English voice track and lip-syncing was criticized. IGN gave The Last Hope International an 8.5, applauding the inclusion of the Japanese voices, and the original anime portraits. X-Play gave The Last Hope 4 out of 5, stating that the story is epic, engaging and well-paced from start to finish, and combat is frantic, complex and smooth. X-Play criticized the game for having bad voice acting, and objectives that aren't always clear to lead the player. TeamXbox awarded the game with a score of 8.5, praising the balanced and addictive combat which allows the player to bring both strategy and gaming skill to the fray. The Official Xbox Magazine gives a score of 8.5, citing the addictive mix of combat, quests and storyline as a plus, but criticizes the long stretch of cutscenes and a lack of save points around.

GameZone's Steven Hopper gave The Last Hope International an 8.5/10, praising the minor enhancements and additional content such as an inclusion of the Japanese voice track, and called it the definitive version of The Last Hope, and a worthy purchase for RPG fans. This sentiment was also echoed by other reviewers such as PixlBit who gave the score 4/5 and 1UP.com who gave it B rating.

The game sold 166,027 copies in its first four days on the Japanese market placing it in third place behind Blue Dragon and Tales of Vesperia for sales of Xbox 360 games in Japan. 24,584 Xbox 360 units were also sold during the week of February 16, 2009. The Last Hope has since become the best-selling Xbox 360 game in Japan, with 208,438 units. As of May 2009, the game has sold 450,000 copies worldwide.
