= Star Ocean: The Divine Force =

- Developer: tri-Ace
- Publisher: Square Enix
- Director: Kentaro Arakawa
- Producer: Shingo Mukaitouge
- Programmer: Yoshiharu Gotanda
- Artists: Akira Yasuda; Yukihiro Kajimoto
- Writers: Yoshiharu Gotanda; Satoshi Wagahara; Shunsuke Sarai
- Composer: Motoi Sakuraba
- Series: Star Ocean
- Platforms: PlayStation 4; PlayStation 5; Windows; Xbox One; Xbox Series X/S
- Release: October 27, 2022
- Genre: Action role-playing
- Mode: Single-player

Star Ocean: The Divine Force (Note: Known in Japan as Star Ocean 6: The Divine Force (スターオーシャン6 ザ ディヴァイン フォース, Sutaaoushan 6 Za Divain Fousu).) is a 2022 action role-playing game developed by tri-Ace and published by Square Enix. It is the sixth major installment in the Star Ocean series and was released for PlayStation 4, PlayStation 5, Windows, Xbox One, and Xbox Series X/S on October 27, 2022. The game's score was composed by series regular Motoi Sakuraba, with character art designed by Akira Yasuda. The game received mixed to positive reception from critics, with some praising the combat, characters, and narrative but many feeling that it was a step down in terms of graphics and that there was some performance inconsistency.

== Reception ==
Reception

Aggregate score
Aggregator	Score
Metacritic	(PS4) 70/100 (PS5) 69/100 (PC) 68/100

Star Ocean: The Divine Force received "mixed or average" reviews, according to video game review aggregator Metacritic.

=== Sales ===
The PlayStation 4 version of Star Ocean: The Divine Force sold 27,001 physical copies within its first week of release in Japan, making it the third-best-selling retail game of the week in the country. The PlayStation 5 version sold 17,177 physical copies in Japan throughout the same week, making it the country's seventh-best-selling retail game.
