= Elemental Gelade =

Japanese manga series

- English manga cover of Elemental Gelade vo1ume 1, featuring Coud Van Giruet

エレメンタルジェレイド (Erementaru Jereido)
- Manga
- Written by: Mayumi Azuma
- Published by: Mag Garden
- English publisher: AUS: Madman Entertainment; NA: Tokyopop (former) Digital Manga Publishing; NZ: Madman Entertainment; UK: Tokyopop
- Magazine: Monthly Comic Blade
- Original run: February 28, 2002 – December 28, 2009
- Volumes: 18
- Manga

Elemental Gelade: Flag of Bluesky
- Written by: Mayumi Azuma
- Published by: Mag Garden
- English publisher: NA: Digital Manga Publishing
- Magazine: Comic Blade Masamune (2003–2007); Comic Blade Avarus (2007–2014)
- Original run: June 15, 2003 – August 15, 2014
- Volumes: 8
- Anime television series
- Directed by: Shigeru Ueda
- Produced by: Fukashi Azuma; Toru Sato; Hidenori Itahashi
- Written by: Naruhisa Arakawa
- Music by: Yuki Kajiura
- Studio: Xebec
- Licensed by: AUS: Madman Entertainment; NA: Discotek Media; UK: MVM Films
- Original network: TXN (TV Tokyo)
- Original run: April 5, 2005 – September 27, 2005
- Episodes: 26
- Light novel
- Written by: Asaka Shou
- Illustrated by: Mayumi Azuma
- Published by: Mag Garden
- Original run: August 29, 2005 – present
- Volumes: 12
- Video game

Elemental Gelade: Matoe, Suifu no Ken
- Developer: Taito
- Genre: Fighting
- Platform: PlayStation 2
- Released: June 30, 2005
- Video game

Elemental Gelade: Tozasareshi Uta
- Developer: Jupiter
- Genre: Role-playing video game
- Platform: Game Boy Advance
- Released: July 7, 2005
- icon

Elemental Gelade (Japanese: エレメンタルジェレイド, Hepburn: Erementaru Jereido; also translated as "Erementar Gerad") is a Japanese manga series written and illustrated by Mayumi Azuma. The fantasy adventure is a tale of a group of five who are on a journey to Edel Garden, the birthplace of mystical beings called Edel Raids who are described as "living weapons".

The manga series has been adapted into an anime television series produced by Xebec, two light novels, two video games, one for the PlayStation 2 and another for the Game Boy Advance, and four drama CDs. The anime ended after 26 episodes. The manga ended in 2009.

Prior to the original broadcast of the anime on TV Tokyo on April 5, 2005, both the manga and anime had been licensed by Tokyopop and Geneon Entertainment, respectively, for North American distribution. The announcement was made even after ADV announced they acquired licensing rights for both manga and anime a year before. Discotek Media rescued the series for a SDBD release on December 18, 2018.

== Plot ==
The tale of Elemental Gelade is set in the world of Guardia where beings called Edel Raids co-exist with humans. Edel Raids (the first word of which is pronounced EL-Dell) have the ability to fuse with a human and become a living weapon. The story focuses on the adventures of a young sky pirate named Coud Van Giruet, an Edel Raid named Reverie Metherlence or Ren as she prefers to be called, and three guardians of an Edel Raid protection organization called Arc Aile named Cisqua, Rowen, and Kuea. Reverie Metherlance is set on journeying to the legendary land of gold called Edel Garden, but it turns out that she is a powerful and rare Edel Raid called the shichikouhouji which leads to many villains attempting to kidnap her for themselves.

== Principal characters ==
Kou / Coud Van Giruet
Voiced by: Akira Ishida (Japanese); Kristian Ayre (English), Naozumi Takahashi (drama CD)
Age:
15
17 (Elemental Gelade: Flag of Blue Sky)
Coud Van Giruet, better known as Cou, is a young member of the Red Lynx sky pirates. He finds Reverie Metherlence in a coffin that was picked up as loot in a raid. He reacts and becomes her Pleasure, someone who bonds with a Edel Raid and he promises her that he will be the one to escort her to Edel Garden. He soon realizes he has deep feelings for Ren and does his best to fight on his own, not wanting to needlessly waste her energy. Despite being a sky pirate, he is a kind person who hates to see the weak getting bullied and is one of the only few people who consider Edel Raids as people instead of weapons. He has absolutely no skill at driving and/or flying any vehicle. However, he improved quite a bit by the time the anime ended.
Gelade Techniques
Euros Loop/Euro Lumin
Notus Chord/Ardos Sword
Reject Out/Wind Armour
Zephyrus Art
Ren / Reverie Metherlence
Voiced by: Mikako Takahashi (Japanese); Brenna O'Brien (English), Houko Kuwashima (drama CD)
Age:
14-15
17 (Elemental Gelade: Flag of Blue Sky)
Reverie Metherlence, better known as Ren, is an Edel Raid and direct descendant of the Metherlence bloodline. She is also one of the Seven Glittering Jewels (or Shichiko-hoji), an Edel Raid line said to be the strongest. She recharges her powers by sleeping, which happens fairly often. In the beginning, she stated that she had hated Coud because he was human, but after he does his best to protect her from an invasion, she reacts with him and begins to think better of him. As the story progresses, she realizes that she has developed feelings for Kou. Her elemental gelade is on her hair above her forehead. Her elemental power is wind, which she best uses both defensively and offensively. Her weapon form is a giant sword on Kou's right arm; the appearance of the sword differs between the anime and manga.
Cisqua
Voiced by: Nana Mizuki (Japanese); Alexandra Carter (English), Ikue Otani (drama CD)
Age:
16
18 (Elemental Gelade: Flag of Blue Sky)
Cisqua is the energetic and upbeat leader of one of Arc Aile's Edel Raid Complete Protection Association squads consisting of Rowen and Kuea. She is honest and passionate about her work, but only because of her desire to be promoted and her love for money. Cisqua is modeled from a character the creator drew in middle and high school and B.B. Hood from the Darkstalkers series.
Cisqua is not an Edel Raid Pledger, but she is well versed in martial arts and gunmanship. Despite having a small frame, she's physically strong and capable on taking down well trained Pledgers such as the Edel Raid Hunter, Wolx Hound. Underneath her robes and hat, she keeps an arsenal of firearms, missiles, knives, and other weapons she uses to fulfill her missions. Cisqua's gun can be adjusted to become a launcher, shotgun, or machine gun. Her sister is Merfond.
Rowen
Voiced by: Yuji Ueda (Japanese); Philip Pacaud (English), Shoutarou Morikubo (drama CD)
Age:
21
23 (Elemental Gelade: Flag of Blue Sky)
Rowen is a guardian of Arc Aile, and is occasionally tasked to assist with his senior in rank, Cisqua. He is a young blond-haired man that tends to dislike conflict. In contrast to the impulsive and somewhat outrageous Cisqua, Rowen is logical, polite, and considerate of others.
Rowen is very intelligent and seems to be well skilled in multiple areas, making it seem as if he was perfect. Whether it is cooking or fighting he seems to excel at it. However Rowen claims to not be entirely perfect and have weaknesses as well. He is an excellent cook which is an ability that the other members appreciate. Rowen is also the only member who is consistently doing jobs to meet ends with the party's expenses.
Gelade Techniques
Vice Lit
Steel Vengeance
Three of Hearts
Curva Proclesis
Kuea / Kullweet Envatilia
Voiced by: Naoko Suzuki (Japanese); France Perras (English), Akemi Okamura (drama CD)
Age:
17
19 (Elemental Gelade: Flag of Blue Sky)
Kuea, whose real name is Kullweet Envatilia, is a first class Edel Raid from Arc Aile and is Rowen's partner. Her garnet red elemental gelade are on the back of both her hands which she covers with arm length gloves. Out of the five main characters, Kuea wears the most revealing clothes, however the creator modeled her character from an old male character she once drew in the past. When Kuea gets hungry—which seems to be often—she cannot react, so she eats enormous amounts of food at a time. It is an ongoing gag that she will eat anything and anyone and she nibbles on Cisqua when she is extremely hungry, her hunger-induced stupor leading her to view Cisqua's head as an apple and in episode 4, she gnaws on Rowen's head, which he ignores and normally greets Kou.
Kuea loves to battle and often jumps into fights hastily. When reacted, she increases Rowen's fighting speed. She takes the weapon form of double blades that Rowen wields on each hand and six chained sickles on his back which can detach and attack opponents from a distance. Her attacks are designed for piercing over slicing. Kuea and Rowen can perform an Obligath, a technique that enables them to chant two songs simultaneously. This technique requires complete synchronicity between the pledger and Edel Raid, and is thus not an easy feat to accomplish.
Viro
A strange girl who temporarily tags along with the group. Artificially created as an Edel Raid, she was assigned to assassinate Coud but later apparently develops feelings for him. Unable to successfully carry her mission out, she is killed by her superiors.
Rasati
Rasati fought Coud at the battle arena to win the freedom of both herself and her sister Lilia. After released from debt and winning her freedom, she later eventually tags along with the group.
Lilia
Taken in by Rasati's family, she is Rasati's Edel Raid and little sister.

== Flag of Bluesky ==
=== Plot ===
The Kingdom of the Sun, Fuajarl was ruthlessly invaded by the Garden of Eden. They came seeking the King's Edel Raid, rumored to be one of the Seven Glittering Jewels (or Shichiko-hoji).

Sensing their intent, the King hid his daughter with his Edel Raid and fought against the invasion but was defeated in battle. The desert kingdom is now blanketed in a sheet of white snow after the battle.

Escaping capture, the Crown Princess Acheaburca Fuajarl XIV reacted with Jeen, the King's Edel Raid, and along with Puffe, the Kingdom's only mechanic, fled Fuajarl in an ancient tank. They are on a journey to restore the Kingdom and exact vengeance on the Garden of Eden.

However just like the first elemental gelade, it is uncertain why Edel Garden is a warring nation for a place that has the name of a beautiful Eden or Utopia.

=== Primary characters ===
Princess Acheaburca Fuajarl XIV
The crown princess of Fuajarl, the Kingdom of the Sun. Her father was King Varna Shinga Fuajarl. She was hidden along with the King's Edel Raid during the invasion of the Garden of Eden. She is now Jeen's pledger after her father's death vowing vengeance on the Garden of Eden. She has fled her Kingdom with Jeen and Puffe in an ancient tank traveling to restore her country and reclaim her throne.
Her crystal pendant somehow allows her to communicate with Idola, a childhood friend.

Jelio "Jeen" Velsown
The Edel Raid of King Varna Shinga and now Princess Achea, she is one of the Shichikou-hoju and her family has been serving the "Solar Bloodline" of Fuajarl for generations. The King's death affected her greatly since the purpose of the attack was to kidnap her, but she hides it by acting cold. Her Gelade is Onyx black and her weapon form is a sword which absorbs sun light, when it moves it looks like a sword dance. She's very skilled with throwing knives.
Puffe Lunder
Resembling a short dog-like creature. He is actually the mechanic of the "Race=Cradle", an ancient tank. He was trusted by the King and serves as Achea's personal attendant. He is now traveling with the Princess and Jeen.
Merfond Liberdec
A woman seeking to open a store in Fuajarl, it was destroyed by the invasion. After getting arrested for fighting, she met Princess Achea and helped them escape. In exchange for returning the King's sword to Princess Achea, she will build a new store on a first grade piece of land paid for by the royal family once she reclaims the throne. She carries explosives with her similar to Cisqua in the main series and is actually her older sister.

=== Secondary characters ===
King Varna Shinga Fuajarl
The King of Fuajarl, the Kingdom of the Sun, Princess Achea's father, and Jeen's pledger. Bearing much foresight, he hid his daughter and his Edel Raid during the invasion by the Garden of Eden. He fought against the invasion of his Kingdom but ultimately lost in a battle against a skilled warrior named the "White Devil".
Idola
Princess Achea's childhood friend and source of strength as he mysteriously guides her to attain more power.

== Terminology ==
- Arc Aile – An organization that "aims to protect the Edel Raids, as well as provide them with happiness". Little is known of their true intentions regarding Edel Raids, especially Ren.
- Chaos Choir – Otherwise known as Organite, a group who opposes Arc Aile. Most members are Sting Raids or Edel Raids.
- Pledger or "Pleasure" – One who has Reacted with an Edel Raid. Also called User in some places.
- React – To merge with an Edel Raid, thus gaining their power.
- Edel Raid – A female entity capable of Reacting with a human and becoming a weapon. An Edel Raid can only have one Pledger at any time; to take a new Pledger, the old one must first die. Edel Raids are also capable of using "songs" (謳), which are the equivalent of magical spells. If their elemental gelade is removed, they turn into normal humans.
- Sting Raid – Otherwise known as Viros in the manga, it is an imitation Edel Raid, possessing lesser powers than that of true Edel Raids. (3 Edel Raids can finish off entire armies of sting raids) They are actually created with imitation elemental gelades or elemental stones. They are generally treated as tools by the Chaos Choir. Sting Raids are also different from Edel Raids in that they don't need a Pledger to react with, they can transform a part of their body.
- Garden of Eden or Edel Garden – Where Edel Raids are born.
- Elemental Gelade – A gem that is embedded on the Edel raid's body. It is proof that they are an Edel Raid. It is also stated to be their soul.
- Shichikou-hoji – The strongest of the Edel Raid bloodlines. There are seven of them.

== Media ==
=== Manga ===
Written and illustrated by Mayumi Azuma, the Elemental Gelade manga was first serialized in Mag Garden magazine Monthly Comic Blade from February 28, 2002 to December 28, 2009. The individual chapters were collected and published into 18 tankōbon volumes by Mag Garden between October 10, 2002, and March 10, 2010. In the summer of 2003, A.D. Vision announced that they acquired the manga's right to the North American audience. Ultimately, however, twelve volumes were released from July 3, 2006, to September 7, 2010, by Tokyopop until it went bankrupt. In 2012, it was relicensed by Digital Manga Publishing (DMP) and all 18 volumes were published in digital format between June 5, 2012, and May 20, 2013.

A spin-off series called Erementar Gerad Flag of Bluesky (蒼空の戦旗, Sōkū no Senki), also by Mayumi Azuma, was first serialized in the Japanese bi-monthly manga magazine Comic Blade Masamune on June 15, 2003, but then migrated to the monthly magazine Comic Blade Avarus on September 15, 2007. In March 2015, the series was put on indefinite hiatus due to Azuma's glaucoma. The first tankōbon volume was released on July 9, 2004, and latest and eighth was released on October 15, 2013. It has been released in North America in digital form by DMP since May 16, 2013. The latter volume published by DMP was the sixth volume on April 29, 2014. Flag of Bluesky takes place two years after the original story and stars a new heroine named Acheaburca Fuajarl XIV, a princess of the Fuajarl Kingdom.

=== Anime ===
The anime adaptation of Elemental Gelade was first aired in Japan on TV Tokyo, starting from April 5, 2005. Xebec produced the animated television series which spawned 26 episodes directed by Shigeru Ueda and music by Yuki Kajiura. The production of the anime adaptation was estimated to cost $400,000. Since the anime was produced before the original story had ended, a new opposing organization called Chaos Choir and their members was created. Existing characters such as Viro were adjusted to fit the new storyline.

In April 2005, Geneon Entertainment announced they were the North American licensor at the MIP TV trade show in France, although ADV Films originally announced that they were the licensor as part of a co-production deal with Mag Garden at Anime Expo in July 2004. Geneon released six DVD volumes bi-monthly from June 2006 to April 2007 containing four to five episodes each. On July 3, 2008, Geneon Entertainment and Funimation announced an agreement to distribute select titles in North America after Geneon ceased distribution of their own titles in October 2007. While Geneon Entertainment will still retain the license, Funimation will assume exclusive rights to the manufacturing, marketing, sales and distribution of select titles. Elemental Gelade was one of several titles involved in the deal.

As of October 2007, Geneon no longer is involved in the US anime industry, so North American distribution rights of the anime have been rescued from Geneon by Funimation.

On October 23, 2018, Discotek Media, known for licensing and rescuing various anime from many generations, rescued this series for a 1-disc SDBD release on December 18, 2018.

ImaginAsian TV, an American television network, broadcast the series along with several other titles from Geneon Entertainment as part of their animation block "Anime EnerG". It was first aired in Japanese with English subtitles beginning January 30, 2007, and later aired with English dubs.

==== Music ====
Opening Theme

- "Forever..."
  - Lyrics: Aa
  - Composition: takumi
  - Arrangement: Hideyuki "Daichi" Suzuki
  - Artist: savage genius

Ending Theme

- "Yakusoku" (約束; Promise)
  - Lyrics & Composition: Michihiro Kuroda
  - Arrangement: Kazuyoshi Baba
  - Artist: Michihiro Kuroda
  - Episodes: 1–25

Insert Theme

- "everlasting song"
  - Lyrics, Composition, & Arrangement: Yuki Kajiura
  - Artist: FictionJunction ASUKA
  - Episodes: 26
- "Ameagari"
  - Artist: Savage Genius
  - Episode: 15

=== Audio CDs ===
Three drama CDs was released by Frontier Works every eleven months for three years starting on October 24, 2003. It featured different voice actors than the anime adaptation. Three maxi singles of the opening and ending themes, two original soundtracks, and one drama CD featuring voice actors from the anime adaptation was released by Victor Entertainment between April 21, 2005, and September 22, 2005.

=== Video games ===
Three video games based on Elemental Gelade were released only in Japan midway through the anime season for mobile phones, PlayStation 2, and Game Boy Advance. Prior to the PS2 release, Taito released a 2D fighting game for mobile phones in May 2005. The PS2 version of the game called Erementar Gerad: Matoe, Suifu no Ken was released on June 30, 2005. Matoe, Suifu no Ken is a 3D cel-shaded fighting game featuring seven characters/groups and two unlockable characters in four modes of play. It was re-released on June 8, 2006, as part of the Taito Best lineup.

The GBA game called Elemental Gelade: Tozasareshi Uta is a 2D turn-based role-playing video game released on July 7, 2005, developed by Jupiter and published by Tomy Corporation. Playing as Kou, Ren, Cisqua, Rowen, and Kuea, you journey from town to town and fight enemies through an original story and meet new original characters.

== Reception ==
On the week of March 8–14, 2010, both the 18th of Elemental Gelade and the sixth volume of Flag of Bluesky were featured on Oricon's weekly chart of the best-selling manga–on the 15th and 30th spot for selling 38,996 and 24,649 copies respectively.

In Jason Thompson's online appendix to Manga: The Complete Guide, he regards the plot as being stereotypically shōnen.

Xenoblade Chronicles 2, a game developed by Monolith Soft and published by Nintendo, shares strikingly similar story and character elements to Elemental Gelade, e.g. "Drivers" and "Blades" instead of "Pledgers" and "Eldel Raids" or "Elysium" instead of "Eldel Garden".
