= Hiro Yūki =

Japanese voice actor (born 1965)

- 優希 比呂
- Born: Teruhisa Tsuyusaki; February 13, 1965 (age 61); Tokyo, Japan
- Occupation: Voice actor
- Years active: 1988–present
- Agent: Green Note (Also serves as an advisor)
- Height: 164 cm (5 ft 5 in)

Hiro Yūki (優希 比呂, Yūki Hiro; born Teruhisa Tsuyusaki (露崎 照久, Tsuyusaki Teruhisa); February 13, 1965 in Tokyo) is a Japanese voice actor who is part of the voice actor quartet Weiß, which also consists of Weiß Kreuz voice castmates Tomokazu Seki, Takehito Koyasu and Shin-ichiro Miki.

In June 2007, Yuki changed the spelling of his name to 優希比呂 from 結城比呂, which still reads as Yūki Hiro.

He's the official Japanese-dubbing voice actor for Stan Marsh in South Park.

== Filmography ==
=== Anime ===
- Dragon Ball Z (1989–1996) – Dende (took over the role in 1996)
- Oishinbo (1991) – Masashi
- Future GPX Cyber Formula (1991) – Henri Claytor
- Nintama Rantaro (1993) – Rikichi Yamada
- The Brave Express Might Gaine (1993) – Yulius
- Brave Police J-Decker (1994) – Drillboy
- Haou Taikei Ryū Knight (1994) – Adeu Waltham
- Tekkaman Blade II (1994) – Dead End/Tekkamen Dead
- Virtua Fighter (1995–1996) – Jimmy Gates
- Dragon Ball Z: Wrath of the Dragon (1995; Film) – Tapion
- Neon Genesis Evangelion (1995) – Makoto Hyuga
- Aka-chan to Boku (1996) – Akihiro Fujii
- Bakusō Kyōdai Let's & Go!! (1996) – Carlo Sereni
- Slayers NEXT (1996) – Alfred Seyruun
- Brave Command Dagwon (1996) – Yoku Kazamatsuri
- Dragon Ball GT (1996– 1997) Dende
- South park Japanese Dub (1997) - Stan
- Mobile Suit Gundam: The 08th MS Team (1996–1999; OVA) – Michel Ninorich
- Shōjo Kakumei Utena (1997) – Dios
- Pokémon (1997) – Dorio
- Arc the Lad (1999) – Arc
- Hoshin Engi (1999) – Taikoubou
- Shamanic Princess (1996–1998) – Leon
- Weiß Kreuz (1998) – Omi Tsukiyono
- Star Ocean EX (2001) – Claude C. Kenni
- s-CRY-ed (2001) – Sou Kigetsuki
- Go! Go! Itsutsugo Land (2001) – Hinoki Morino
- RockMan.EXE (2002) – Raika
- Witch Hunter Robin (2002) – Michael Lee
- Mobile Suit Gundam SEED (2002–2003) – Clotho Buer
- Weiß Kreuz Glühen (2002–2003) – Omi Tsukiyono
- Samurai Champloo (2004) – Niwa Tatsunoshin
- Initial D Fourth Stage (2004) – Shinichi
- Suki na Mono wa Suki Dakara Shōganai! (2005) – Chris
- Speed Grapher (2005) – Tsujido
- Buso Renkin (2006) – Kawazui
- Nerima Daikon Brothers (2006) – Yūkel Hakushon
- Claymore (2007) – Rigaldo
- Yes! PreCure 5 (2007) – Kawarino
- Air Gear (2007) – Mitsuru Bando
- Hakushaku to Yōsei (2008) – Nico
- Kaidan Restaurant (2009) – Sho Koumoto
- Metal Fight Beyblade (2009–2012) – Ryuutarou Fukami
- Toriko (2012) – Ohtake
- Hero Bank (2014) – Agreement Shuto

=== Video games ===
- Arc the Lad series – Arc
- Angelique series – Marcel
- Black/Matrix series – Phillipe
- Dragon Ball Z: Sparking series – Tapion
- Fatal Fury series – Alfred
- Makeruna! Makendō 2 (1995) – Masoccer
- Neon Genesis Evangelion: Girlfriend of Steel 2nd – Makoto Hyuga
- Reijou Tantei Office no Jikenbo – Tatsuya Asami
- Samurai Shodown V (2003) – Yoshitora Tokugawa
- Samurai Shodown V Special (2004) – Yoshitora Tokugawa
- Star Ocean series – Ratix Ferrence
- Sukisho series – Chris
- Super Robot Wars series – Clotho Buer, Adeu Waltham
- Tales of Graces (2009) – Reimon

=== Drama CDs ===
- Abunai series 3: Abunai Bara to Yuri no Sono
- Abunai series 5: Abunai Shiawase Chou Bangaihen – Papa Sudou, Shinobu Suzaku, Aki Shinohara
- Junjou Boy Series 1: Junjou Boy Kinryouku – Samiya Kouzuki
- Junjou Boy Series 2: Junjou Heart Kaihouku – Samiya Kouzuki
- Kageki series 4: Kageki ni Koi Meikyuu – young Touma
- Kiken ga Ippai – Yuuki Ogawa
- Konna Joushi ni Damasarete 1 & 2 – Kaname Midorikawa
- Shiritsu Takizawa Koukou Seitokai – Naoki Sone
- Suit and Ribbon Tie – Yoshiyuki Takaoka
- Tokyo Deep Night – Makoto Mihara
- Tokyo Midnight – Makoto Mihara
- Tsukiyo ni Koisuru Touzoku-san – Ruu

=== Tokusatsu ===
- Doubutsu Sentai Zyuohger (2016) – Saguil Brothers B (A Voiced by Hidenobu Kiuchi) (ep. 37 – 38)

=== Dubbing ===
==== Live-action ====
- Life with Mikey – Barry Corman (David Krumholtz)
- She-Wolf of London – Rod (Daniel Pope)

==== Animation ====
- Shrek films – Gingerbread Man
- Shrek Forever After – Cookie
- South Park – Stan Marsh (Trey Parker)
