= Star Ocean (video game) =

1996 video game

- Super Famicom cover art
- Developers: tri-Ace (SFC); Tose (PSP)
- Publishers: Enix (SFC); Square Enix (PSP/PS4/Switch)
- Director: Joe Asanuma
- Producer: Yoshinori Yamagishi
- Designer: Masaki Norimoto
- Programmer: Yoshiharu Gotanda
- Artist: Meimu
- Writer: Yoshiharu Gotanda
- Composer: Motoi Sakuraba
- Series: Star Ocean
- Platforms: Super Famicom, PlayStation Portable, Nintendo Switch, PlayStation 4
- Release: Super Famicom: JP: July 19, 1996; PlayStation Portable: JP: December 27, 2007; NA: October 21, 2008; PAL: October 24, 2008; First Departure R Nintendo Switch, PlayStation 4: WW: December 5, 2019
- Genre: Action role-playing
- Mode: Single-player

Star Ocean (Note: Japanese: スターオーシャン, Hepburn: Sutā Ōshan) is a 1996 action role-playing game developed by tri-Ace and published by Enix for the Super Famicom. The first game in the Star Ocean series, it was released only in Japan in July 1996, and was the first game developed by tri-Ace, consisting of staff that had previously left Wolf Team due to being unhappy with the development process for Tales of Phantasia with Namco in 1995. The game used a special compression chip in its cartridge to compress and store all of the game's data due to possessing graphics that pushed the limits of the Super Famicom. Additionally, the game had voice acting for the game's intro and voice clips that played during the game's battle gameplay, a rarity for games on the system.

The story involves three friends who, while searching for the cure to a new disease, come into contact with a space-faring federation that is locked in a war with another galactic power. Using advanced technologies and time travel, the group attempts to uncover the cause of the war and to find a cure for their planet. The Super Famicom version was never released outside Japan due to Enix closing its American branch shortly before the game was finished, as well as Nintendo's focus on supporting the then-upcoming Nintendo 64 video game console. The game was later remade by Tose for the PlayStation Portable under the title Star Ocean: First Departure, (Note: Japanese: スターオーシャン1 ファーストディパーチャー, Hepburn: Sutā Ōshan Fāsuto Dipāchā) and released in English-speaking regions in North America, Europe, and Australia in October 2008. A remastered version titled Star Ocean: First Departure R (Note: Japanese: スターオーシャン ファーストディパーチャー アール, Hepburn: Sutā Ōshan Fāsuto Dipāchā Āru) was released for the Nintendo Switch and PlayStation 4 worldwide in December 2019. The game was the start of the Star Ocean series, featuring six main games, three spin-offs, a remake, a remaster, and a manga.

== Gameplay ==
Star Ocean is a role-playing video game that is played from a top-down perspective. The player navigates a character throughout the game world, exploring towns and dungeons and interacting with non-player characters. Unlike the original game, the PlayStation Portable remake includes a world map for the player to navigate.

=== Party ===
In progressing through the game, the player is able to recruit up to eight additional characters to travel alongside the protagonist; some recruitments happen automatically, while others only happen depending on the previous actions and options taken by the player. Though only 8 characters can be recruited in a playthrough, ten characters are available to be recruited, and as a result not all characters can be recruited in one playthrough of the game. Certain characters cannot be recruited unless the player's party is a specific size, or the player has made specific story decisions. In First Departure, players have the option of recruiting characters they did not previously have the option of adding to their party.

=== Battle ===
One of the battles at one of Roak's towns, Kratus

When players move their party in the game's dungeons and paths, random battles occur. Combat is done in a 3D isometric point of view. Unlike games in the Final Fantasy or Dragon Quest series, the battles are not turn based, but play out in real time. Players also do not directly control all of their characters' actions, but instead chose battle strategies beforehand for all but one of their characters who then move and attack their closest enemy automatically. Added to First Departure was a combo attack system where special attacks stack to become more powerful. Players can equip characters with four special abilities with "ranged" and "distance" slots, whereas the remake reduced that number to two. Up to four characters can participate in battles, but the player is only able to control one character at a time, leaving the others to be controlled by the computer's artificial intelligence. The player can switch which character is being controlled in battle. All characters have a standard "attack" option, in which the character's equipped item is used to attack whichever enemy the player has locked on to. Additionally, special techniques called Symbology can be used as well, which have the potential to deal more damage, but cost MP (Mental Points), of which each character has a finite amount. Special attacks are assigned before combat begins.

=== Customization ===
Special Points (abbreviated "SP" in game) are also rewarded from battles, and are used to customize the character's abilities. For instance, allotting SP to the cooking ability grants or improves a given character's ability to make consumable foods out of raw materials in order to heal characters from damage taken in battles. Item creation can allow for characters to be able to create weapons and equipment that are stronger than those available to be bought in stores and towns. Individual items have a 20 item limit.

=== Affection system ===
Star Ocean has a game mechanic called "Private Actions" that plays a role in character development. While entirely optional, they often reveal additional backstory of particular characters or have other varying effects on gameplay. Upon arriving in a town, the player can opt to have all the characters in the party to temporarily split up and go their separate ways within the limitations of the town. The player retains control of just Roddick (Ratix in the original Super Famicom game), and is able to look for the other characters. Upon finding other party members, various events may happen; sometimes only small talk results, other times, larger events happen, that may even require a choice to be made by the player. Depending on the results, this can cause characters to either gain or lose "affinity" toward other characters in the party. For example, if one character loves another, the affinity level will be high, but if the former is mistreated, it will lower their feelings for the latter. A character's affinity towards one another can have effects on the rest of the game. Affinity also affect which character's endings players see. While the game's overarching plot always largely ends the same, various parts of the ending are changed, added, or left out, depending on characters' affinity at the end of the game.

== Synopsis ==
=== Plot ===
The game takes place in S.D 346 (A.D 2432), and starts off in a small town of Kratus on the under-developed planet of Roak. There, a few of the local Fellpool (cat-like people) youth, Roddick, Millie, and Dorne, are part of the village's local "Defense Force", who defend the village from minor threats such as thieves and robbers. One day, however, a neighboring town, Coule, starts contracting a terrible disease that turns people into stone. The town healer, Millie's father, contracts the disease while trying to get rid of it, leading the group to search Mt. Metorx for a herb that is rumored to cure any sickness. Dorne unintentionally contracts the disease as well after touching an infected pigeon.

When they reach the summit, they are confronted by Ronyx J. Kenny and Ilia Silvestri, two crew members of the Earth Federation (Terran Alliance in the PSP remake) starship Calnus. They inform them that the disease was sent to the planet by a foreign race called the Lezonians, whom the Earth Federation has been at war with. Roddick and Millie go with them on their spacecraft to help them find a cure. They learn that Fellpool blood could be used to process a special, invisible material which could give them a massive advantage in the war. Upon coming in contact with Lezonians, they reveal that they were being forced into war by a shadowy, powerful third party with a disgust for the Federation.

Before Dorne fully succumbs to the disease, they do tests on him to figure out a cure. They determined that the only possible way to fight it would be to make a vaccine that uses the original source of the disease. While the origin of the virus is tracked back to being on Roak itself, it is from Asmodeus, the King of the Demon World, who had been killed 300 years prior to the spread of the disease. Ronyx talks the group into using a Time Gate on the Planet Styx to go back 300 years into the past to track down Asmodeus back when he was still alive. While this works, Ilia trips while approaching the gate. As such, Ilia and Roddick have a delay from when they enter the time gate, and after the trip through time, they find themselves separated from Ronyx and Millie. The two groups work towards locating each other, and Asmodeus, in efforts to heal their family members and stop the war.

=== Characters ===
- Roddick Farrence (Note: ラティクス・ファーレンス (Ratix Farrence)) is a 19-year-old Fellpool swordsman and the game's protagonist. Roddick is a childhood friend of Millie and Dorne who served with them as town watchmen before being swept into adventure. He is voiced by Yuri Lowenthal in the English version, Mamoru Miyano in the Japanese remake and remastered, and Hiro Yuki in Super Famicom original and remastered.
- Millie Chliette (Note: ミリー・キリート (Milly Killet)) is an 18-year-old Fellpool practitioner of Symbology healing magic who wields a staff, and a longtime friend and romantic interest for Roddick. She is voiced by Katie Leigh in the English version, Hitomi Nabatame in the Japanese remake and remastered, and Konami Yoshida in the Super Famicom original and remastered.
- Ronyx J. Kenny (Note: ロニキス・J・ケニー (Ronixis J. Kenny)) is the 38-year-old human captain of the starship Calnus, and uses a bow and arrows after leaving his phaser weapon behind. He is the father of Claude C. Kenny, the protagonist of Star Ocean: The Second Story. He is voiced by Sam Gold in the English version, Kenji Hamada in the Japanese remake and remastered, and Akira Okamori in the Super Famicom original and remastered.
- Ilia Silvestri (Note: イリア・シルベストリ (Iria Silvestoli)) is the 23-year-old human head science officer on the Calnus, serving under Ronyx. She fights using martial arts supplemented by gloves or claws, and enjoys alcohol. She is voiced by Julie Maddalena in the English version, Sanae Kobayashi in the Japanese remake and remastered, and Wakana Yamazaki in the Super Famicom original and remastered.
- Cyuss Warren (Note: シウス・ウォーレン (Cius Warren)) is a 20-year-old Highlander who wields a large broadsword. Son of Lord Lias, one of the Three Heroes of the Demonic Wars, he dreams of becoming the greatest swordsman in the land. He is voiced by Grant George in the English version, and Hiroki Tochi in both Japanese versions.
- Ashlay Bernbeldt (Note: アシュレイ・バーンベルト (Ashlay Barnbelt)) is a 57-year-old Highlander soldier wandering the world to find a successor in which to teach his sword skills. If recruited, he forms such a relationship with Roddick, and thus they share many of the same techniques. He is voiced by Michael McConnohie in the English version, and Norio Wakamoto in the Japanese remake and remastered, and Kazuhiko Inoue in the Super Famicom original and remastered.
- Phia Melle (Note: フィア・メル (Fear Mell)) is a 20-year-old Highlander and the head of the Astral Knights who uses throwing daggers in combat with the Hisho-ken style. She has feelings for Cyuss, but hides them under her outward desire to be a great knight. She is voiced by Dorothy Fahn in the English version, Megumi Toyoguchi in the Japanese remake and remastered, and Konami Yoshida in the Super Famicom original and remastered.
- Mavelle Froesson (Note: マーヴェル・フローズン (Marvel Frozen)) is a mysterious 19-year-old sorceress who accompanies Ronyx and Millie to Ionis. Her weapon is an orb that she throws at the enemy. She is voiced by Tara Platt in the English version, Hoko Kuwashima in the Japanese remake and remastered, and Nozomi Nonaka in the Super Famicom original and remastered.
- Ioshua Jerand (Note: ヨシュア・ジェランド (Jousha Jerand)) is a 20-year-old magic-using Featherfolk who is searching for his sister Erys, whom he was separated from after their parents were murdered. He despises combat, but realizes it as a necessary evil to survive in the world. He is voiced by Ezra Weisz in the English version, Jun Fukuyama in the Japanese remake and remastered, and Nobuyuki Hiyama in the Super Famicom original and remastered.
- T'nique Arcana (Note: ティニーク・アルカナ (Tinek Arukena)) is an 18-year-old Lycanthrope who can transform into a dark blue werewolf in battle, and trains to become an excellent fighter and martial artist. He is voiced by Vic Mignogna in the English version, Chihiro Suzuki in the Japanese remake and remastered, and Takuya Fujisaki in the Super Famicom original and remastered.
- Pericci (Note: ペリシー (Perisie)) is a 16-year-old Lesser Fellpool with more pronounced cat-like features including feline ears and fangs. Pericci serves as comedic relief, starting with low stats but gains several powerful techniques. She is voiced by Alicyn Packard in the English version, Yukari Tamura in the Japanese remake and remastered, and Wakana Yamazaki in the Super Famicom original and remastered.
- Erys Jerand (Note: エリス・ジェランド (Eris Jerand)) is Ioshua's 17-year-old sister who was kidnapped when they were children, and was brainwashed to be an assassin by the mysterious Crimson Shield. She later escaped and swapped her body with Mavelle to search for her parents' killer in secret. Erys does not appear in the original Super Famicom release, and is voiced by Stephanie Sheh in English, and Kana Ueda in Japanese.
- Welch Vineyard (Note: ウェルチ・ビンヤード (Welch Vineyard)) is a mysterious 18-year-old traveler who appears somewhat ditzy and interested in meeting guys. Welch, like Erys, is only available in the remake. She first appeared as a non-playable character in Star Ocean: Till the End of Time, but has been retroactively added to the first two games. She is voiced by Melissa Fahn in the English version, and Tomoe Hanba in the Japanese version.

== Development ==
In 1994, video game developers Wolf Team signed a deal with publisher Namco to release the game that would be Tales of Phantasia, which was later released in 1995 in Japan for the Super Famicom. The development cycle for this game, however, was plagued with creative disputes between the developers and publisher, leading to much of the development team leaving to form a new company, which would become tri-Ace, which explains some of the common themes between the games, such as the similar battle systems.

After Tales of Phantasia was completed, some of the game's designers felt that the core skill and item systems were too "generic", and for their next game they would make a much deeper gameplay experience. To deepen the story, the "private action" system was created to reveal more of the characters history, personality and relationships, but the score the game generated from various choices was hidden from players since there was no "right" or "wrong" story path. In order to tell a "bigger" story, space was chosen as the setting.

Both Tales of Phantasia and Star Ocean stretched the power of the Super Famicom to its limits, with a total of 48 megabits of data. Additionally, Star Ocean was also one of two games that used a special S-DD1 chip to aid in compression of almost all graphics and map data, meaning that it effectively stored even more data than Tales of Phantasia, though the compression led to a lower audio quality. The game also featured special technology called a "Flexible Voice Driver" that allowed for the compression of sound, allowing for voice clips for characters when in battles, another trait that was both very rare for a Super Famicom game, and shared with Tales of Phantasia. Different voice clips would be played depending on the scenario; if the characters were confronted by weak enemies, they may say something more confident, where as if confronted by strong enemies, they may say something more fearful or frantic. Mode 7 graphics were generated using software, and appear when items pop out of treasure chests; the need for extra tiles, however, limited the graphical effects implementation. The game also featured surround sound. Planning for a sequel began as soon as development was completed on Star Ocean. Feedback about weak boss monsters later led to more challenging battles in Star Ocean: The Second Story.

The game was released on July 19, 1996. Despite appearing in North American video game magazine Nintendo Power in 1996, the Super Famicom version was never officially released anywhere outside Japan. Enix America ceased to publish games in North America by the end of 1995 due to poor sales, and Nintendo had already passed on publishing Tales of Phantasia a year prior, instead choosing to focus on the then-upcoming Nintendo 64 video game console. The game was later unofficially translated into English by DeJap Translations, who created a patch that made the game fully playable in English via emulation. The game would not be officially available in English until 12 years later, when the game was remade for the PlayStation Portable as Star Ocean: First Departure in 2008.

=== First Departure ===
Star Ocean: First Departure is an enhanced remake of the original Star Ocean for the PlayStation Portable, developed by Tose. The first details of the game were revealed at the "Star Ocean Special Stage" during the Square Enix Party 2007, alongside those of Star Ocean: The Second Story. Yoshinori Yamagishi, producer of the series, stated that he wanted the remakes to feel as though they're completely new games.

The game was first released in Japan on December 27, 2007, then in North America and Europe in October 2008, marking the first time that the original Star Ocean was officially released outside Japan. The English localization was handled by Nanica, Inc., with voice-over production services provided by Epcar Entertainment, Inc. First Departure uses a slightly altered version of the engine used for Star Ocean: The Second Story with similar features, including prerendered backgrounds, 3D battle fields and hand drawn facial animations. Production I.G provided new artwork and animated cutscenes for the game. New playable characters have been added as well. New voice actors and extensive amounts of new, fully voiced dialogue were included, with even some non-player characters being voiced over as well. A limited edition called the Star Ocean: First Departure Eternal Edition was released exclusively in Japan alongside the standard version. It features alternate box art and was bundled with a Star Ocean-themed PSP-2000 handheld and carrying pouch.

An HD remaster of the PlayStation Portable version titled Star Ocean: First Departure R for the Nintendo Switch and PlayStation 4 was released in December 2019. The new release features re-balanced game difficulty and increased world map movement speed as well as the option to toggle between character portraits from the PSP version or re-drawn designs based on the Super Famicom version. The English release allows the player to choose between English voices or Japanese audio from either the PSP version or re-recorded dialogue from the original Super Famicom voice actors.

=== Music ===
The scores for Star Ocean and First Departure were composed and arranged by Motoi Sakuraba. Music from the game was included on the album Star Ocean Perfect Sound Collection, released on November 1, 1996, by Sony Records, which included arranged medleys of themes from the Super Famicom version by Sakuraba, Yoshiharu Gotanda, and Kazushi Satoh as well as voice tracks. An album containing music from the PSP version was released on January 30, 2008, by Sony Music and Square Enix which contained 68 tracks across two discs. Critics praised Sakuraba's progressive rock style, and highlighted his musical experimentation throughout the original Star Ocean score and First Departure. Tracks added from Star Ocean: The Second Story received mixed reviews on the First Departure album, adding some familiar Star Ocean themes but also some lesser known songs to the mix. Several musical pieces were missing from the original album and were added to the remake's release.

The First Departure remake features the theme song "Heart" performed by Japanese music group Asunaro, which accompanied the game's opening animation as well as the end credits, and was included in that version's official soundtrack in 2008. This theme was replaced for the First Departure R release with the song "Atarashī Ippo" (新しい一歩; "The First Step") by Yauchi Keiko of Shadow of Laffandor.

== Reception ==
Reception

Aggregate scores
Aggregator	Score
GameRankings	PSP: 77% SNES: 93%
Metacritic	PSP: 74/100; NS: 74/100; PS4: 73/100

Review scores
Publication	Score
1Up.com	PSP: B+
Famitsu	SFC: 8/10, 6/10, 7/10, 7/10; PSP: 8/10, 7/10, 8/10, 8/10
Game Informer	PSP: 7/10
GameSpot	PSP: 6/10
GameSpy	PSP: 4/5
IGN	PSP: 7.4/10
Nintendo Life	SNES: 9/10

The original Super Famicom release of Star Ocean sold approximately 235,000 copies in Japan, of which just over 175,000 copies were sold during 1996. The four reviewers in the Japanese magazine Weekly Famitsu generally gave the game complimentary scores. Two reviewers found the game unique and ambitious in its gameplay, with one reviewer critiquing that the real-time battle system would make players panic and mash buttons. They had different opinions on the story of the game with one saying it was solid, another saying the player's mileage in the game will depend on their how much they can get into the story, while another said that stories involving travelling to the future and past were a bit cliche at the moment. In a 2009 retro review, Nintendo Life praised the game's technical aspects calling it "one of the best-looking Super Nintendo games ever created" and that the soundtrack "never ceases to amaze".

Star Ocean: First Departure on the PlayStation Portable sold 115,280 copies in its debut week in Japan, with lifetime sales of approximately 204,996 copies in the region. The Weekly Famitsu gave the game high enough scores to earn the publication's Silver Award. While the editors thought the title's animation and characters were well done and the story was "charming" they lamented that players could only save their progress at certain points such as the world map, which they also felt too large and had a limited field of view.

The English version of First Departure received mixed to average reviews, earning a 77% rating on GameRankings and a 74 out of 100 average from Metacritic. Many reviewers felt that despite the updated graphics and sound, the game still felt less refined than more modern role-playing games. IGN found the game to have a "bland, awkwardly-told narrative" with "weak characters", but thought that it would appeal to fans of older games. GameSpot also stated that the title had "limited appeal" in addition to providing little challenge. Andrew Fitch of 1UP.com, however, called First Departure an "overlooked classic" with "ridiculously engrossing crafting minutiae" and numerous character party combinations that increase its replay value. GameSpy called Star Ocean: First Departure one of the best games for PSP platform.

First Departure R for the PlayStation 4 earned a 73 out of 100 average from Metacritic. Dualshockers called it "an underwhelming port of an excellent but often forgotten Square Enix JRPG", remarking that any improvements to the PSP version were "mostly minor" such as the re-balance to the game's difficulty. The website remarked that the character designs featured in the animated cutscenes originally created for the PSP version do not match the remaster's new artwork, adding that these scenes were rare, but they are emblematic of the fairly low-effort port that Star Ocean First Departure R is. PlayStation Universe called attention to the title's "simplistic gameplay" and repetitive combat, but commended the animation of its character sprites and updated portrait art.
