= Tri-Ace =

Japanese video game development company

tri-Ace, Inc.
- Type: Subsidiary
- Industry: Video games
- Founded: March 1995
- Headquarters: Tokyo, Japan
- Key people: Yoshiharu Gotanda (president); Masaki Norimoto (designer); Motoi Sakuraba (composer)
- Products: Star Ocean; Valkyrie Profile
- Number of employees: 176 (2024)
- Parent: Nepro Japan (2015–present)
- Website: tri-ace.co.jp

tri-Ace, Inc. (株式会社トライエース, Kabushiki Gaisha Toraiēsu) is a Japanese video game developer founded in 1995. It is known for its role-playing games, most notably the Star Ocean and Valkyrie Profile series.

== History ==
tri-Ace was formed in March 1995 by former Telenet Japan employees Yoshiharu Gotanda (programmer, current tri-Ace President), Masaki Norimoto (game designer) and Joe Asanuma (director). The name is a play on words regarding the "three aces" who formed the company. Most of tri-Ace's games have been published by Square Enix (formerly Enix).

The company exclusively makes role-playing video games, and is known for giving its games' action-packed battle systems and deep skill systems. This trademark style began when the founders of tri-Ace originally worked for Telenet Japan's Wolfteam, and had created Tales of Phantasia. This game, published by Namco, is a precursor to tri-Ace's own Star Ocean games in several ways; e.g., an action battle system where the player controls one character and AI controls others in the party and special battle skills that the player can assign to different buttons. Besides the Star Ocean series, it also released Valkyrie Profile in 1999.

After its long-time Square Enix liaison and producer, Yoshinori Yamagishi, announced that he was done working on the Star Ocean series in 2009, several of tri-Ace's works started to be published by different game companies other than Square Enix. Such as its 2010 release of Resonance of Fate which was taken to Sega publishing. As well, onwards there began to be a lack of tri-Ace games that received English localizations until Exist Archive in 2016.

tri-Ace games have sold over 3.8 million copies worldwide as of September 2005. The company's sound programmer Hiroya Hatsushiba formed tri-Crescendo in 1999 which has since developed several games independently of tri-Ace.

Japanese mobile company Nepro Japan acquired tri-Ace in February 2015. Despite being acquired by a company focusing on mobile gaming, tri-Ace continued developing video games for consoles, as evidenced by Star Ocean: Integrity and Faithlessness in 2016 and then Star Ocean: The Divine Force in 2022, but weeks before the release for Star Ocean: The Divine Force, tri-Ace was reported to have financial issues and was insolvent.

== Games developed ==
| Year | Title | Publisher(s) | Platform(s) |
|---|---|---|---|
| 1996 | Star Ocean | Enix | SNES |
| 1998 | Star Ocean: The Second Story | Enix | PlayStation |
| 1999 | Valkyrie Profile | Enix | PlayStation |
| 2001 | Star Ocean: Blue Sphere | Enix | Game Boy Color |
| 2003 | Star Ocean: Till the End of Time | Enix | PlayStation 2 |
| 2004 | Star Ocean: Till the End of Time Director's Cut | Square Enix | PlayStation 2 |
| 2005 | Radiata Stories | Square Enix | PlayStation 2 |
| 2006 | Valkyrie Profile 2: Silmeria | Square Enix | PlayStation 2 |
| 2008 | Infinite Undiscovery | Square Enix | Xbox 360 |
| 2008 | Valkyrie Profile: Covenant of the Plume | Square Enix | Nintendo DS |
| 2009 | Star Ocean: The Last Hope | Square Enix | Xbox 360 |
| 2010 | Resonance of Fate | Sega | PlayStation 3, Xbox 360 |
| 2010 | Star Ocean: The Last Hope International | Square Enix | PlayStation 3 |
| 2011 | Final Fantasy XIII-2 | Square Enix | PlayStation 3, Xbox 360 |
| 2011 | Frontier Gate | Konami | PlayStation Portable |
| 2012 | Beyond the Labyrinth | Konami | Nintendo 3DS |
| 2012 | Danball Senki W | Level 5 | PlayStation Portable, PlayStation Vita |
| 2013 | Frontier Gate Boost+ | Konami | PlayStation Portable |
| 2013 | Lightning Returns: Final Fantasy XIII | Square Enix | PlayStation 3, Xbox 360 |
| 2014 | Silent Scope: Bone-Eater | Konami | Arcade |
| 2014 | Judas Code | tri-Ace | PlayStation Vita |
| 2014 | Phantasy Star Nova | Sega | PlayStation Vita |
| 2015 | Exist Archive: The Other Side of the Sky | Spike Chunsoft | PlayStation 4, PlayStation Vita |
| 2016 | Star Ocean: Integrity and Faithlessness | Square Enix | PlayStation 4, PlayStation 3 |
| 2016 | Heaven × Inferno | NTT Docomo | iOS, Android |
| 2016 | Star Ocean: Anamnesis | Square Enix | iOS, Android |
| 2017 | Star Ocean: The Last Hope - 4K & Full HD Remaster | Square Enix | Microsoft Windows, PlayStation 4 |
| 2018 | Resonance of Fate 4K / HD Edition | tri-Ace | Microsoft Windows, PlayStation 4 |
| 2018 | Mist Gears | Shueisha | iOS, Android |
| 2022 | Star Ocean: The Divine Force | Square Enix | Microsoft Windows, PlayStation 4, PlayStation 5, Xbox One, Xbox Series X/S |
| 2026 | OCTOPinbs | Aniplex | Microsoft Windows |
