= Star Ocean =

Japanese video game franchise

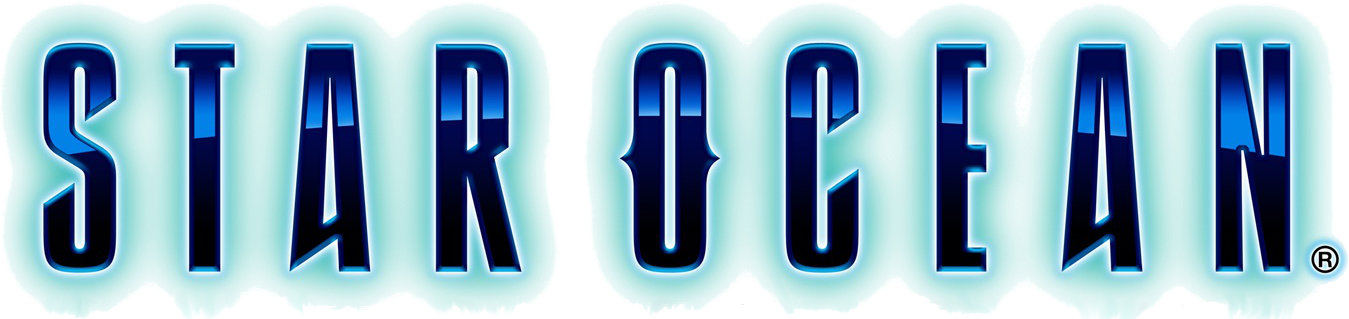
- The logo used for Star Ocean: The Last Hope
- Genre: Action role-playing
- Developer: tri-Ace
- Publisher: Square Enix
- Creators: Yoshiharu Gotanda; Masaki Norimoto; Joe Asanuma
- Composer: Motoi Sakuraba
- First release: Star Ocean; July 19, 1996
- Latest release: Star Ocean: The Second Story R November 2, 2023

Star Ocean (Note: Japanese: スターオーシャン, Hepburn: Sutā Ōshan) is a franchise of science fantasy Action role-playing video games developed by the Japanese company tri-Ace and published by Square Enix (formerly Enix).

== Development ==
=== History ===
Star Ocean is known as one of the earliest real-time RPGs to allow players to alter the storyline's outcome through the player's actions and dialogue choices, mainly through a social relationship system referred to as "private actions". The original Star Ocean, published by Enix in 1996 and developed by tri-Ace, introduced a "private actions" social system, where the protagonist's relationship points with the other characters are affected by the player's choices, which in turn affects the storyline, leading to branching paths and multiple different endings. This was expanded in its 1999 sequel, Star Ocean: The Second Story, which boasted as many as 86 different endings, with each of the possible permutations to these endings numbering in the hundreds, setting a benchmark for the number of outcomes possible for a video game. Using a relationship system inspired by dating sims, each of the characters had friendship points and relationship points with each of the other characters, allowing the player to pair together, or ship, any couples (both romantic heterosexual relationships as well as friendships) of their choice. The relationship system in Star Ocean, however, not only affected the storyline, but also the gameplay, affecting the way the characters behave towards each other in battle.

=== Creation and design ===
As fans of science fiction and space travel, the developers at tri-Ace created the Star Ocean series with a sci-fi setting in mind and have cited Star Trek as one of their main influences for the visuals of the games as well as being an underlying, but noticeable, influence to the series as a whole. While the first Star Ocean game included more fantasy elements to appeal to a broad audience, subsequent installments naturally moved towards a more sci-fi oriented feel, with Star Ocean: Till the End of Time described by its producer Yoshinori Yamagishi as tri-Ace's "ultimate vision" of the "whole Star Ocean world". The large gap of time between Star Ocean: The Second Story and Till the End of Time, in terms of in-universe chronology, can be explained by the series' choice to emphasize the setting of its fictional world rather than focus on its characters. In Star Ocean: Integrity and Faithlessness, producer Shuichi Kobayashi noted that one of the game series most important themes is first contact between two different societies and planets.

== Games ==
Release timeline
1996	Star Ocean
1997
1998	The Second Story
1999
2000
2001	Blue Sphere
2002
2003	Till the End of Time
2004
2005
2006
2007	First Departure
2008	Second Evolution
2009	The Last Hope
2009	Blue Sphere (Mobile)
2010	The Last Hope International
2011
2012
2013	Material Trader
2014
2015	Second Evolution (PS3, PS4, Vita)
2016	Integrity and Faithlessness
2016	Anamnesis
2017	Till the End of Time (PS4)
2017	The Last Hope (PS4, Windows)
2018
2019	First Departure R
2020
2021
2022	The Divine Force
2023	The Second Story R
2024
2025
2026	The Second Story R (NS 2)

The first game in the series was simply titled Star Ocean. It was released on July 19, 1996 for the Super Famicom and never released outside Japan, but was unofficially translated into English through ROM hacking by DeJap Translations, and the resulting game can be played through emulation. It established the series' staples, including the futuristic setting, real-time battle system, item creation, and private actions. It takes place in 346 SD, and follows the adventures of Roddick Farrence as he searches for a cure for a sickness on his planet with the help of two Earthlings. An enhanced remake entitled Star Ocean: First Departure was released for the PlayStation Portable on December 27, 2007 in Japan, and in North America and Europe in October 2008. The game was remade using Star Ocean 2's engine, adopting prerendered backgrounds and 3D battlefields, as well as new character art and animated cut-scenes provided by Production I.G, and fully voiced dialogue. There are also new playable characters.

Star Ocean: The Second Story was released for the PlayStation on July 30, 1998, in Japan, May 31, 1999, in North America, and April 12, 2000, in Europe. It retains the features of its predecessor while introducing prerendered backgrounds, full motion videos, and 3D battlefields. Taking place in 366 SD, it features a new cast of characters, including Claude C. Kenny, the son of Ronyx J. Kenny from the original Star Ocean, and Rena Lanford, who both investigate the Sorcery Globe, which has landed on Planet Expel and has been causing disasters ever since. An enhanced port entitled Star Ocean: Second Evolution was released for the PlayStation Portable on April 2, 2008, in Japan, January 20, 2009, in North America, and in Australia and Europe in the following month. It features similar enhancements, including fully voiced dialogue, new playable characters, and new character artwork and animated cut-scenes provided by Production I.G.

Star Ocean: Blue Sphere is a direct sequel to The Second Story, released for the Game Boy Color on June 28, 2001, in Japan (a North American version was planned but canceled). Blue Sphere adapts the Star Ocean series to hand-helds altering several aspects in the process, including interactive item creation, auto private actions, 2D side scrolling battles, Field Actions, and the removal of random battles. It takes place in 368 SD, two years after The Second Story, and features the return of all twelve main characters as they attempt to solve the mystery of the Planet Edifice and its destructive nature that eradicates the planet's civilizations every 200 years. In 2008 it received a Japanese-only remake for mobile devices with new graphics, new controls, and a retooled battle system.

Star Ocean: Till the End of Time was released for the PlayStation 2 in Japan in 2003. A director's cut of the game with bonus dungeons, new playable characters, a versus mode, and tweaked gameplay was released in 2004, and that version was brought to North America and Europe the same year. Till the End of Time is the first fully 3D game in the series and features fully voiced dialogue. It retains most aspects of the previous games with new features, such as the fury and bonus battle gauge, as well as the ability to patent items created during item creation and recruiting inventors to create items for the player. The game takes place nearly 400 years after the last Blue Sphere, in 772 SD. Fayt Leingod is the main character, and after finding himself separated from his family during an alien attack on a resort planet, is pursued by the same Vendeeni forces across space for reasons beyond his imagination.

Star Ocean: The Last Hope was released for the Xbox 360 in February 2009 for Japan and North America, and in June of the same year for Australia and Europe. It was also released for the PlayStation 3 worldwide in February 2010. It is a prequel to the entire series, chronicling the aftermath of World War III in which humanity must find a new home to survive. The protagonist is a young man named Edge Maverick who is accompanied by his childhood friend Reimi Saionji.

Star Ocean: Material Trader is a free-to-play card and item creation RPG developed by Hippos Lab and published by Square Enix for the GREE mobile phone social network in 2013. GREE and Square Enix has terminated the service as of February 2014, and the application has since been delisted.

Star Ocean: Integrity and Faithlessness was released for the PlayStation 4 and PlayStation 3 in 2016. The story takes place between Star Ocean: The Second Story and Star Ocean: Till the End of Time, in 537 SD.

Star Ocean: Anamnesis was a free-to-play role-playing game featuring three-dimensional characters and environments. Players could participate in real-time battles against enemies that supported up to four players. It was released in Japan on December 7, 2016, and later worldwide in July 2018 for Android and iOS devices. Both the global and Japanese versions were terminated in 2019 and 2021, respectively.

Star Ocean: The Divine Force was released for PlayStation 4, PlayStation 5, Xbox One, Xbox Series X/S, and PC via Steam on October 27, 2022. The game features two protagonists and a story that changes based on player's choices. Akira Yasuda, also known as Akiman, returned as character designer from Integrity and Faithlessness and Anamnesis.

=== North American releases ===
Of the seven games in the series, six have been released outside Japan. Star Ocean: The Second Story was the first game to be published in the USA, by Sony Computer Entertainment America.

With the PlayStation 2's installment, Star Ocean: Till the End of Time, Square Enix hoped to attract more gamers, especially in the United States, where the franchise has not been very popular. The Director's Cut 2-disc version of Star Ocean: Till the End of Time has been released in North America, with more playable characters, more games and additional storyline tangents. As of July 2005, Star Ocean: Till the End of Time is a part of Sony's Greatest Hits line, indicating that the game had done reasonably well in North America.

In 2008, Square Enix released an enhanced remake of the original Star Ocean title for the PlayStation Portable called Star Ocean: First Departure. This was followed in 2009 by an enhanced port of Star Ocean: The Second Story for the PlayStation Portable called Star Ocean: Second Evolution.

Star Ocean: The Last Hope was released in North America within one week of its Japanese release on Xbox 360. An enhanced version called Star Ocean: The Last Hope International edition was later released as a PS3 exclusive worldwide in the first quarter of 2010. This port included the Japanese audio, new character portraits, as well as a few other new features exclusive to that version. Star Ocean: The Last Hope is also available on Steam as 4K & Full HD remaster.

Star Ocean: Blue Sphere remains the only game in the series not released outside Japan in any form.

== Common elements ==
The characters of the series were designed to be "action-figure-like". A feature adjusting the characters' appearance when changing their equipment was considered for the series but ultimately was scrapped because of the large number of characters to design. In the later installment of Star Ocean: The Last Hope the appearance of the characters did in fact change to reflect the type of weapon they were using.

Another recurring gameplay feature is that many of the branching story choices and different endings are not easily accessible, as things like "affection points" are not exposed to the player. This has proven both frustrating to some players who feel they are missing out on choices they didn't know about, but for others it opens up further replay ability as newly discovered choices will yield a new story.

Star Ocean games also take an all-encompassing approach to items. Party members can create new objects or improve existing ones through crafts like metalworking, alchemy, writing, painting and cooking. The strongest items and equipment are usually only available via Item Creation, and many others can be sold for a profit or provide other benefits (books can be used to transfer skills and abilities; cooked foods can be used to circumvent the 20-of-each-item inventory limit), placing great importance on Item Creation.

Star Ocean games are known for their real-time battle engines, and, for being one of the first of its kind to come to the consoles. Battles take place on a separate screen, but all characters (rather than waiting in one spot and taking damage) are fully mobile in three dimensions, can dodge and chase foes, and must cast their spells and deploy attacks despite enemy harassment. In the earlier games, magicians had spells, whereas fighters had special physical attacks called "Killer Moves"; both are learned after passing certain level requirements (or through specific items and sidequests) and cost HP or MP to use. In Star Ocean: Till the End of Time, all the characters are able to use spells and battle skills (i.e. killer moves).

== Music ==
The first Star Ocean was composed by Motoi Sakuraba, and included orchestral samples, including flutes, and even included digitized battle cries during combat. Motoi composed and arranged the scores for Star Ocean and First Departure. Critics praised Sakuraba's progressive rock style, and highlighted his musical experimentation throughout the original Star Ocean score and First Departure. Tracks added from Star Ocean: The Second Story received mixed reviews on the First Departure album, adding some familiar Star Ocean themes but also some lesser known songs to the mix. Several musical pieces were missing from the original album and were added to the remake's release. The First Departure remake features the theme song "Heart" performed by Japanese music group Asunaro, which accompanied the game's opening animation as well as the end credits, and was included in that version's official soundtrack in 2008. This theme was replaced for the First Departure R release with the song "Atarashī Ippo" (新しい一歩; "The First Step") by Yauchi Keiko of Shadow of Laffandor.

The music of Star Ocean: Blue Sphere was composed by regular series composer Motoi Sakuraba, who created the soundtrack on a PC-9801. Composing for the Game Boy Color presented multiple limitations in cord numbers and quality. The battle theme, "Hand to Hand", was a track Sakuraba particularly remembered, as he tried to capture the momentum of battle despite the limited hardware. Motoi composed the music for Star Ocean: Till the End of Time. The soundtrack was eventually released in four parts. The limited edition of Volume 1 also came with box to hold all four albums. When the game was revised into the Director's Cut, Sakuraba composed a few new pieces of music and released an album for them. The song "The Small Bird That Forgot How To Fly" (飛び方を忘れた小さな鳥, Tobikata Wo Wasureta Chiisana Tori) by the JPop singer Misia was used to accompany the game's ending credits. Motoi composed the music for Star Ocean: The Last Hope. The soundtrack was released in two parts: Star Ocean: The Last Hope Original Soundtrack, a 3-CD set containing all the music tracks in the game, with a total of 71 tracks. It also contains a DVD extra of an interview with Sakuraba himself, plus video footage of his workshop and some original music performed by him. The other is Star Ocean: The Last Hope Arrange Soundtrack, a selection of tracks from the original soundtrack performed in different remixes. Sakuraba is a "series mainstay", and included a "synth-rock" soundtrack in Star Ocean: Integrity and Faithlessness. As with the other games in the Star Ocean series, Star Ocean: Anamnesis soundtrack was composed by Motoi Sakuraba.

== Manga and anime ==
There was an incomplete manga series by Mayumi Azuma based on Star Ocean: The Second Story, which became a similarly incomplete anime series Star Ocean EX. The anime series saw release by Geneon Entertainment in the United States. The anime features 26 episodes covering events that happened on the first disc of the PlayStation game. The show was continued on drama CDs afterward.

== Reception ==
Aggregate review scores
Game	Metacritic
Star Ocean	PSP: 74/100; NS: 74/100; PS4: 73/100
Star Ocean: The Second Story	PS: 80/100; PSP: 75/100
Star Ocean: Blue Sphere	N/A
Star Ocean: Till the End of Time	PS2: 80/100; PS4: 72/100
Star Ocean: The Last Hope	X360: 72/100; PS3: 74/100; PS4: 72/100
Star Ocean: Integrity and Faithlessness	PS4: 58/100
Star Ocean: Anamnesis	N/A
Star Ocean: The Divine Force	PS4: 70/100; PS5: 69/100; PC: 68/100

By 2013, the game series had shipped over 4.2 million copies. In a 2009 retro review, Nintendo Life praised Star Ocean technical aspects calling it "one of the best-looking Super Nintendo games ever created" and that the soundtrack "never ceases to amaze". Famitsu reviewed Star Ocean: The First Departure, a remake of the original Star Ocean, saying the title's animation and characters were well done and the story was "charming" though they lamented that players could only save their progress at certain points such as the world map, which they also felt was too large and had a limited field of view. Star Ocean: The Second Story is one of the most popular games of the series. While most reviewers gave positive reviews, some considered the game only mediocre. Jeff Lundrigan, reviewing the PlayStation version of the game for Next Generation, wrote that the game has its pluses and minuses, but ultimately called it "average" in his review. Star Ocean: Blue Sphere's popularity in Japan, primarily for its story and gameplay systems, prompted tri-Ace to remake it for mobile devices. The remake included redrawn graphics and a remastered soundtrack.

Initially, Star Ocean: Till the End of Time received a somewhat negative impression in Japan. Parts of the game were alleged to be buggy, and the game refused to work at all in older SCPH-10000 PlayStation 2s. Enix blamed Sony, as they had coded Star Ocean 3 with features from updated libraries that were apparently not backward-compatible. Star Ocean: The Last Hope was reviewed by IGN which stated that despite the rough pacing in the storyline that could be told in a much more engaging manner, tri-Ace and Square Enix's latest RPG holds together quite well with action-packed gameplay. One of the small annoyances encountered during the game is the disc-swapping, which requires players to switch discs if they need to travel between planets later in the game.

Star Ocean: Integrity and Faithlessness was noted by IGN for having graphics that varied widely in quality, from very high quality to Minecraft and noting there were no cutscenes, so the acting had less emotional impact. They did, however, praise the game's score and cast of characters. Star Ocean: Anamnesis was described by Kotaku as "exploitative but charming", praising the game's use of nostalgia, but abhorring the "blandness" of its free to play formula.

== See also ==
- List of Square Enix video game franchises
