= Mayumi Azuma =

Japanese manga artist

Azuma Mayumi 東 まゆみ
- Born: April 24, 1975 (age 51) Tokyo, Japan
- Areas: Manga artist, Writer
- Notable works: Elemental Gelade

Mayumi Azuma (東 まゆみ, Azuma Mayumi; born April 24, 1975) is a Japanese manga artist, who is the creator of the now completed manga Elemental Gelade, which finished with eighteen volumes and was adapted into a 26-episode anime television series, and its spinoff manga Elemental Gelade: Flag of Blue Sky. She is also recognized for creating the manga adaptation of the video game Star Ocean: The Second Story, which was later adapted into an anime entitled Star Ocean EX.

Before her career as a manga artist took off, she started out working as an assistant to Kozue Amano, creator of Aria.

== Works ==
- Manga
  - Enix (now Square Enix)
    - Night Walker! (ナイトウォーカー!) (1995–1996, Monthly Shōnen GagOh!)
    - Get! (GET!) (1999, Monthly Shōnen Gangan)
    - Vampire Savior: Tamashii no Mayoigo (ヴァンパイア セイヴァー 〜魂の迷い子〜) (1997–2001, Monthly Gangan Wing)
    - Star Ocean: The Second Story (スターオーシャン セカンドストーリー) (1999–2001, Monthly Shōnen Gangan)
  - Mag Garden
    - Elemental Gelade (EREMENTAR GERAD) (2002–2009, Monthly Comic Blade)
    - Elemental Gelade: Flag of Blue Sky (EREMENTAR GERAD -蒼空の戦旗-) (2003–2014, Comic Blade Masamune)
    - Toraneko Folklore (とらねこフォークロア) (2010–2013, Monthly Comic Blade)
    - Uchū Senkan Yamato Ni-ichi-kyū-kyū: Higan no Ēsu (宇宙戦艦ヤマト2199 緋眼のエース) (2013–present, Monthly Comic Blade), Space Battleship Yamato 2199 spin-off manga
- Video Game
  - Star Ocean: Blue Sphere (Character Designer)
