= Star Ocean: The Second Story =

1998 video game

- North American PlayStation cover art
- Developer: tri-Ace (Note: Second Evolution developed by Tose, with its PS4, PS3 and Vita ports developed by Gemdrops. The Second Story R developed by Gemdrops.)
- Publishers: JP: Enix; WW: Sony Computer Entertainment; Square Enix (Evolution, R)
- Directors: Masaki Norimoto; Yoshiharu Gotanda
- Artist: Minato Koio
- Composer: Motoi Sakuraba
- Series: Star Ocean
- Engine: Unity (Second Story R)
- Platforms: PlayStation; PlayStation Portable; PlayStation Vita; PlayStation 3; PlayStation 4; Second Story R; Nintendo Switch; PlayStation 4; PlayStation 5; Windows; Nintendo Switch 2
- Release: PlayStation; JP: July 30, 1998; NA: June 8, 1999; EU: April 12, 2000; Second Evolution; PlayStation Portable; JP: April 2, 2008; NA: January 20, 2009; AU: February 12, 2009; EU: February 13, 2009; PlayStation 4, PlayStation Vita; JP: October 28, 2015; PlayStation 3; JP: December 24, 2015; The Second Story R; Switch, PS4, PS5, Windows; WW: November 2, 2023; Switch 2; WW: July 15, 2026
- Genre: Action role-playing
- Mode: Single-player

Star Ocean: The Second Story (Note: Known in Japan as Star Ocean: Second Story (スターオーシャン セカンドストーリー, Sutā Ōshan: Sekando Sutōrī)) is an action role-playing video game developed by tri-Ace and published by Enix for the PlayStation. It is the second game in the Star Ocean series and the first game in the series to be released outside Japan, arriving in North America in June 1999 and Europe in April 2000, by Sony Computer Entertainment. Taking place in a science fantasy universe, the story centers around a young man named Claude C. Kenny, an officer from a space-faring Earth organization who is stranded on an undeveloped, medieval-level planet where he meets a girl named Rena Lanford. There, they both meet several companions and must stop a plot from an evil group that spans multiple worlds. The game was the basis of manga and anime adaptations.

The game received favourable reviews on release and was lauded for its innovative gameplay elements not previously seen in the genre, while borrowing some of the best features of popular JRPG Final Fantasy VII. The game has garnered a cult following and is often considered the best entry in the series.

An enhanced remaster titled Star Ocean: Second Evolution, (Note: Known in Japan as Star Ocean 2: Second Evolution (スターオーシャン2 セカンド エヴォリューション, Sutā Ōshan 2: Sekando Evoryūshon).) developed by Tose, was released for the PlayStation Portable in April 2008 in Japan, and 2009 in North America, Europe, and Australia. It features newly animated cutscenes by Production I.G, a re-recorded soundtrack, and additional story elements.

Second Evolution was later rereleased for PlayStation 4, PlayStation Vita and PlayStation 3 in 2015. The Download Version features enhanced graphics and BGM, a new theme song, and DLC items. Square Enix never released this version outside of Japan.

A remake titled Star Ocean: The Second Story R (Note: Known in Japan as Star Ocean: Second Story R (スターオーシャン セカンドストーリー R, Sutā Ōshan: Sekando Sutōrī R).) and developed by Gemdrops, was released for the Nintendo Switch, PlayStation 4, PlayStation 5, and Windows in November 2023, then later for the Nintendo Switch 2 in July 2026.

== Gameplay ==
The game gives the player the choice of playing as Claude or Rena, with the journey evolving and ending differently depending on the choices one makes. There are ten other playable characters in the game, though the player can only recruit six of them to fill out their eight-member party, and some recruitment choices will make other characters no longer available. The Second Story's gameplay is broadly similar to that of most RPGs. The player goes from town to town and dungeon to dungeon, following the central story and occasionally branching off to perform side quests. Characters gain experience points from battle and level up as a result, becoming gradually stronger as time passes and more battles are fought.

A random encounter battle

Battles play in real time, during which the player has manual control over their character, as opposed to choosing options from a menu. Battles take place on a broad battlefield, over which the player's character can move without limit, allowing them to trade blows face-to-face with the enemy or circle around for a flanking attack. The other party members (up to 3 others) are controlled by the game's AI; the player may change an ally's strategy to one of six different pre-determined options (such as "Spread out and attack", "Save your Magic Points", and "Stand Still and Don't Do Anything").

Nine different batches of skills are sold in in-game shops; once unlocked this way, they must be learned by committing battle-earned "Skill Points" to them. Some skills raise a character's statistics, some unlock Specialty abilities, and some provide bonuses in battle (such as the ability to counter-attack). Specialties allow the characters to create a wide variety of items, and include Herbal medicine, Cooking, Writing, Composing and Musicianship, Pickpocketing and Training. Furthermore, the entire party can contribute to "Super Specialty" skills such as "Master Chef", Blacksmithing, Publishing and "Reverse Side", which allows the character to counterfeit valuable items at the risk of lowering their allies' opinion of them. Every item created has some sort of tangible benefit (foods restore Hit Points and/or Magic Points, training increases the gain in Experience Points, and written novels can be submitted to a publisher, with royalties collectable later) but every attempt requires the expenditure of a consumable item, and may fail to produce anything useful.

A mechanic called "Private Actions" allows the player to influence the relations between their characters. During a "Private Action", the player's party temporarily breaks up during a visit to a town, with each character going their own way to shop, visit friends and family, or relax. The player's main character (either Claude or Rena) can then interact with their allies, often with the option of making one of those allies like another character more or less. This "relationship point" mechanic can have a major effect in battle—if Character A's close friend is felled, Character A will get major combat bonuses for a short time—and also determines what ending the player will see, as each party member's scene plays out differently depending on who they befriended. There are 86 possible endings.

== Plot ==
Star Ocean: The Second Story takes place in S.D 366 (A.D 2452), twenty years after the original game, Star Ocean. The game tells the stories of Claude C. Kenny, son of Ronyx J. Kenny, and Rena Lanford, a young girl living on the planet Expel. Claude, having recently been commissioned as an ensign in the Earth Federation, is given his first mission under the supervision of his father. This first mission is to survey the planet Milocinia (renamed Milokeenia in the PSP port), where a mysterious energy field appears. Finding a mysterious device on Milocinia, Claude begins to examine it close-up, despite orders to keep away from it. As he approaches, the machine activates, teleporting him to Expel. Once on Expel, Claude meets Rena who mistakes him for the "Hero of Light", spoken of in legends on Expel because he wields a "Sword of Light" (actually the standard-issue Phase Gun all Federation officers carry) and is dressed in "alien raiments". She takes him back to her village, Arlia, for corroboration.

In Arlia, it is explained to Claude that a meteorite crashed into Expel. Almost immediately afterwards, monsters began appearing, and natural disasters occurred with increasing frequency and intensity. Believing that these events were related, the people of Expel called the meteorite the "Sorcery Globe". Though he explains that he is not the Hero of Light, Claude offers to investigate the Sorcery Globe, in the hopes that it might help lead him home. Rena assists him as his native guide and hopes to find knowledge about her origin, being an orphan.

Though their journey takes them the long way around, Claude and Rena (and whichever characters the player decides to recruit) manage to travel across Expel and finally reach the Sorcery Globe and encounter the Ten Wise Men. The Sorcery Globe, which the Ten Wise Men call the "Quadratic Sphere", is a device they planted on Expel in order to steer it into a massive energy formation called Energy Nede, from which the Ten Wise Men were exiled thousands of years ago. It is their hope to return to Energy Nede using Expel as a vessel. They succeed and the entire planet of Expel is destroyed by its collision with Energy Nede.

After engaging the Ten Wise Men in battle, they are defeated. Claude and Rena survive due to being within the teleportation zone cast by the Ten Wise Men as the travel to Energy Nede. They are met by Mayor Narl who explains who the Ten Wise Men are, why they were exiled, and that, now that they are back, they hope to destroy the entire universe using advanced Heraldry (magic). Narl furthermore announces that Energy Nede has the ability to restore Expel by using powerful Heraldry to turn back time, but this is only possible if the Ten Wise Men are defeated. Claude and Rena agree to help in the resistance, and embark on various voyages to strengthen themselves, obtain information and learn about the enemy.

Eventually Claude and Rena along with their friends assault the Ten Wise Men's stronghold at Fienal, where they put an end to the enemy once and for all. The ending is composed of scenes describing the fates of the party's characters, and changes slightly depending on if the player discovered the Ten Wise Men's true identity and "raison d'être" through the means of Private Actions.

== Development ==
Enix opted to use sprites for characters in order to realize an anime style of character visuals that they felt was not yet possible with polygonal models.

== Second Evolution ==
Star Ocean: Second Evolution is an enhanced remaster of Star Ocean: The Second Story for the PSP, ported by Tose. It serves as a sequel to Star Ocean: First Departure. The first details of the game were revealed at the "Star Ocean Special Stage" during the Square Enix Party 2007. Yoshinori Yamagishi, producer of the series, said that he wanted the remakes to feel as though they are completely new games. It was released in Japan on April 2, 2008, in North America on January 20, 2009, and in Australia and Europe in the following month.

Second Evolution features new content (many skills were completely remade, as well the combat system being slightly refined), including a new playable character and 13 new endings (for a total number of 99–100 endings). Production I.G provided new artwork and animated cutscenes for the game. There are new voice actors and extensive amounts of new, fully voiced dialogue. The opening song is "Start", performed by Scandal.

Hori, the Japanese game peripheral manufacturer, released a Second Evolution-branded PSP accessory set alongside the game in April 2008. The kit included a limited edition gray PSP case with the Star Ocean logo, matching headphones, a cell phone strap, and 2 UMD cases to hold both First Departure and Second Evolution games.

Second Evolution was later ported by Gemdrops and producer Yoshinori Yamagishi to PlayStation 4, PlayStation Vita and PlayStation 3 in Japan in 2015. It has a new theme song and DLC items to help players in the game. Square Enix never released this version outside of Japan.

== Second Story R ==
A remake, titled Star Ocean: The Second Story R (Note: Known in Japan as Star Ocean: Second Story R (スターオーシャン セカンドストーリー R, Sutā Ōshan: Sekando Sutōrī R).) and developed by Gemdrops, was released for the Nintendo Switch, PlayStation 4, PlayStation 5, and Windows on November 2, 2023.

== Reception ==
Reception

Aggregate scores
Aggregator	Score
GameRankings	(PS) 79% (PSP) 76%
Metacritic	(PS) 80/100 (PSP) 75/100 (PS5) 86/100

Review scores
Publication	Score
Famitsu	(PS) 33/40
Game Informer	(PS) 7.5/10 (PSP) 7/10
GameSpot	(PS) 8.3/10 (PSP) 7.5/10
IGN	(PS) 8.8/10 (PSP) 8/10
Next Generation	3/5
RPGFan	(PS) 90/100 (PSP) 80/100
Dengeki PlayStation	80/100, 65/100, 70/100, 80/100

Star Ocean: The Second Story was a commercial success, having sold 1.094 million copies worldwide, with 724,000 copies sold in Japan alone and 370,000 copies sold overseas. It was the 13th best-selling game of 1998 in Japan. The game, however, did not sell enough copies in North America to be re-released in the Greatest Hits range.

The game received favourable reviews on release and was lauded for innovative gameplay elements not previously seen in the genre, while borrowing some of the best features of popular JRPG Final Fantasy VII. While most reviewers gave positive reviews, some considered the game only mediocre. Jeff Lundrigan, reviewing the PlayStation version of the game for Next Generation, wrote that the game has its pluses and minuses, but ultimately called it "average" in his review. Regardless, the game has garnered a cult following and enjoyed various remasters and re-releases over the years.

By August 2008, Star Ocean: Second Evolution had sold 141,218 copies in Japan. Star Ocean: Second Evolution was the 90th best-selling game in Japan in 2008, selling 143,434 copies. By 2011, Second Evolution had sold 159,745 copies in Japan, bringing total worldwide sales of The Second Story and Second Evolution to 1,253,745 units.

== Manga, anime and drama CD adaptations ==
A seven-volume manga series was written and illustrated by Mayumi Azuma. Based on the tri-Ace role-playing video game of the same name, it follows the exploits of Claude C. Kenny, a young ensign in the Earth Federation who finds himself stranded on the Planet Expel. He meets Rena Lanford, a young girl living in the village of Arlia who declares that he is the legendary warrior their legends speak of who will save their troubled world from disaster. The series was serialized in Shōnen Gangan, premiering June 22, 1999 and running until December 21, 2001, when it ended without reaching the conclusion of the story.

Studio Deen adapted the manga series into a twenty-six-episode anime series entitled Star Ocean EX which aired on TV Tokyo from April 3 to September 25, 2001. The anime series was released to Region 1 DVD by Geneon Entertainment and later to Region A SD Blu-ray by Discotek Media. To complete the story left unfinished by both the manga and anime, five drama CDs were released in Japan, using the same voice actors from the anime series.
