= Star Ocean: Till the End of Time =

2003 video game

- Developer: tri-Ace
- Publishers: Original; Enix; Director's Cut; Square Enix (JP/NA); Ubisoft (EU/AU)
- Director: Yoshiharu Gotanda
- Producers: Yoshinori Yamagishi; Hajime Kojima
- Designer: Masaki Norimoto
- Artists: Jun Sato; Keiichi Asai
- Writers: Yoshiharu Gotanda; Hiroshi Ogawa
- Composer: Motoi Sakuraba
- Series: Star Ocean
- Platforms: PlayStation 2, PlayStation 4
- Release: Original version: JP: February 27, 2003; Director's Cut: JP: January 22, 2004; NA: August 31, 2004; AU: September 30, 2004; EU: October 1, 2004
- Genre: Action role-playing
- Modes: Single-player, multiplayer (Director's Cut only)

Star Ocean: Till the End of Time (Note: Known in Japan as Star Ocean 3 (スターオーシャン3, Sutā Ōshan Surī).) is an action role-playing game, the third main game in the Star Ocean series. The game was developed by tri-Ace and published by Square Enix for the PlayStation 2 console. It was released in Japan, North America, and the PAL territories. The original Japanese release date was in February 2003 by Enix, its penultimate release before its merger to become Square Enix. It was re-released in 2004 as a two-disc Director's Cut version with bonus features such as new characters and dungeons. The North American and European versions are based on the Director's Cut version with Ubisoft handling publishing rights in Europe. Till the End of Time takes place four hundred years after the events of Star Ocean: The Second Story.

== Gameplay ==
While having many similarities to its predecessor, Star Ocean: Till the End of Time includes many elements that make it unique among the majority of role-playing video games. Instead of menu-driven combat, Star Ocean 3 offers real-time interactive combat, similar to the .hack and Tales series. Battles occur when running into enemies on the main travel field or when certain pre-scripted events occur. In battle, the player directly controls one character, while the other two characters are controlled by AI. The player can, however, choose the tactics used by AI characters or switch which character they are directly controlling.

Fayt (left), Nel (center), and Adray (right) fighting an enemy in a battle

Enemy attacks can target either a player's hit points (HP) or mental points (MP). Players will also lose HP from using special attacks or lose MP from using symbology or runeology, which is functionally equivalent to magic in other games. If a character loses all of their HP or, unlike most games, if they lose all of their MP, they are knocked out and unable to continue participation in the battle (unless certain revival items are used). Each character also has a Fury meter, which governs how fast the character moves over the battle screen, and how often actions can be performed. Standing still will replenish Fury, while any movement will continue to drain it or cause the character to lag. If all three characters are defeated, the game is over and the player must reload from their last saved game. If all the enemies are defeated, the player is awarded money (Fol) and experience points (EXP). When some groups of enemies are defeated, the player's characters can also receive a small amount of HP/MP, to counteract the HP/MP that was lost as a result of using special attacks or symbology/runeology.

When the player strikes an enemy, the Bonus Battle Gauge will fill. When the gauge reaches full capacity, the player will enter "Bonus Battle", where the player receives special bonuses, which can help benefit a character's EXP, Fol, items received after battle, etc. If a character receives a critical hit, runs away from battle, or dies, the gauge will deplete completely, resulting in the end of "Bonus Battle" and any bonuses the player received. The Bonus Battle Gauge will also reset if the player turns the game off and turns it back on, or restarts their save file.

Like the previous games in the series, the game contains an Item Creation feature that allows the player to create and enhance a multitude of items. A variety of trades are offered, including Cookery, Alchemy, Engineering, and Smithery. Workshops for Item Creation are scattered throughout the towns and dungeons of the game and can be invested in by the player to allow a wider variety of items to be made there. Once a player invents an item, they can file for a patent, and get money from the profits made off selling those items in various shops. The player is also able to recruit inventors to aid them in creating various items.

The Director's Cut version added a VS. Mode to battle against a second player or against the computer. Up to two human players could compete, either against each other or against another character controlled by the computer. Another addition was the use of "Battle Trophies" which may be acquired by completing various challenges in combat. For example, a player can receive a battle trophy for winning a battle in under 30 seconds, or for defeating a boss without receiving damage. Earning battle trophies unlocks bonus options such as harder game difficulty levels, alternate costumes, and a sound test.

== Story ==
=== Setting ===
The universe of Star Ocean is science fiction in nature, although like the first two games in the series, much of the plot is set on an "underdeveloped planet". The game is set in S.D 772 (A.D 2858). It features a galaxy-spanning government in the Pangalactic Federation, several races and species of aliens, different factions, multiple colonized planets, and advanced technology. Despite having a science fiction atmosphere, a form of magic exists in the universe: symbology, also known as heraldry in the Japanese version and in Star Ocean: The Second Story. Standard symbology involves tattooing crests and runes onto one's flesh to draw out apparently latent power in the form of spells, and numerous underdeveloped planets make extensive use of it. Despite its supernatural connotations, symbology is treated as a legitimate field of scientific study in-universe.

=== Plot ===
Fayt Leingod, son of symbological geneticist Robert Leingod, accompanies his family on a vacation to Hyda IV, alongside the family of his childhood friend Sophia Esteed. Without warning, the planet is hit by an unprovoked attack by the Vendeeni — an alien civilization with highly advanced technology that spans only a single planet — which prompts the Pangalactic Federation to declare war on them. Both Fayt and Sophia manage to escape by a Federation starship with their family, only for the Vendeeni to attack it. Seeking an escape pod on the ship, Fayt finds himself separated from his family, and eventually becomes stranded on Vanguard III, an "underdeveloped plant" on par with the technology of 16th Century Earth. Whilst offering to help some of the inhabitants deal with a threat posed by an exiled off-world criminal, he finds himself encountering Cliff Fittir, a member of the anti-Federation organization Quark, who came searching for him.

Unwilling to explain the reason why, except that Quark's leader wishes to speak to him, Fayt agrees to accompany Cliff and his assistant, Mirage, in their ship. The Vendeeni, however, track down the vessel and attack it, forcing the group to crash-land on Elicoor II, another underdeveloped world with technology on par with 17th century Earth. The group quickly find themselves captured by the Kingdom of Airyglyph, which is currently locked in a war with its neighbour Aquaria, and who presume that the three off-worlders are engineers from the technologically advanced continent of Greeton based on what they witnessed of their ship's design after its arrival. Imprisoned to attract what knowledge they have on their technology, Fayt, Cliff and Mirage are resecued by Nel Zelpher, an agent from Aquaria, who seeks their assistance in turning the tide of the war in Aquaria's favor, under threat she will kill them to avoid Airyglyph using them to the country's advantage. With little choice, the group agree to assist, becoming embroiled in the conflict. As the war descends into a final battle between the two nations, two Vendeeni battleships track down Fayt and enters the planet's orbit, threatening both nations. Finding himself threatened, Fayt unexpectedly taps into a previously unknown power of his to destroy it.

In the resulting chaos, Quark's leader, Maria Traydor, manages to track down Fayt, Cliff and Mirage, and contacts them, revealing she intends to interrogate Fayt's father over "crimes" he committed, revealing they involve Fayt's power. Learning the Vendeeni have taken control of an unusual artifact that is out-of-place on Elicoor II, the group confront them to force them off planet, encountering Robert being held prisoner at the site. The battle leads to Robert being fatally wounded, dying before Maria can learn the scope of his experiments into Symbology. Forced to leave Elicoor II, Fayt travels with Quark, accompanied by his allies (including one from his recent adventures in Elicoor II), to uncover more behind recent events. To the party's horror, they learn that a new threat recently arrived following the attack on Hyda IV, in the form of ultra-powerful space-borne beings calling themselves "Executioners". With both the Vendeeni and Federation powerless to stop them, Earth is soon attacked and devastated. Seeking answers, the party uses a hint from Robert to seek answers at a research facility on the Moonbase, where Fayt finds himself reunited with Sophia. A search of the facilities records reveals that Fayt, Sophia and Maria were all the product of a major project in symbological genetics.

The project came about following the discovery of an extremely advanced structure known as a Time Gate on the planet Styx. When the explorers who found it activated it, a voice informed them that their species forays in to symbological genetics had angered a being called the "Creator", and that they were to face sentencing for their actions. In response, the Federation determined the Time Gate was a link to beings from another plane of existence, referred to as "4D Space", and that the power of Symbology could be used to access it. Robert and his wife Ryoko, and Clive Esteed, Sophia's father, decided to use their offspring for a major Symbological experiment; Maria, who was adopted by one of Robert's colleagues, Jessie Traydor, was also included in the project. All three were Symbologically altered — Fayt gained the power of Destruction, Maria the power of Alteration, and Sophia the power of Connection — allowing them the power to activate the Time Gate when together and access the Creator's dimension. The Vendeeni found out about the project, and sought out all three in hopes of avoiding their destruction. With the knowledge they acquire, the party travel to Styx, dealing with the Executioners' forces, and accessing the Time Gate, traveling into 4D Space.

Once in 4D Space, the party discover their universe is actually not real in relation to the dimension's inhabitants, but a massive computer simulation dubbed the "Eternal Sphere" — a massively multiplayer online game for the inhabitants of 4D Space, created by Luther Lansfeld, the owner of the Sphere Company. Fayt and the others learn that the Executioners are anti-viruses, sent in by Luther to delete what he believes to be anomalies in the Milky Way section of the Eternal Sphere. His sister Blair, who helps the party learn the nature of their existence, determines the inhabitants of the Eternal Sphere have achieved a level of sentience equal to that of 4D citizens. Luther, considering the universe to be "mere data", become furious with being unable to contain the situation and decides to delete the entire Eternal Sphere, forcing Fayt and the others to fight him and ultimately defeat him. Even though Luther is deleted in his arrogance, the party discover they cannot stop the universe facing deletion. Unwilling to let that happen, Fayt determines that their sentience makes it impossible for the universe to be destroyed, resulting in the will of its inhabitants to undo the damage and make themselves independent of 4D Space. The party goes their separate ways with the situation resolved, with Fayt's "affection" level dictating whether he goes with one of them or goes off on his own.

== Development ==
One of the major influences of the design changes from Star Ocean: The Second Story to Till the End of Time was Star Trek. The combat system was mostly unaltered from the previous title, but characters were rendered in 3D instead of 2D and more strategy was incorporated into the fights. Transitioning to a completely 3D environment from a 2D/3D mix was a lengthy process, and was only possible due to the increased power of the PlayStation 2 console. In terms of story message, game producer Yoshinori Yamagishi stated that the main message the game communicates is one of "trust". Several characters and dungeons did not make the cut for the final version of the game, but most of what developers wanted found its way into the game. Gameplay balance was adjusted between the Japanese and American releases, as well as fixing various technical errors that occurred in the original Japanese release.

== Soundtrack ==
The music for this game was composed by Motoi Sakuraba, a long-time collaborator with tri-Ace. The soundtrack was eventually released in four parts:

- Original Soundtrack Volume 1 - a 2-CD set containing mainly the softer and orchestral pieces from the game.
- Original Soundtrack Volume 2 - another 2-CD set containing the upbeat music, primarily the battle and dungeon themes.
- Arrange Album - a selection of tracks from the game reworked in different styles.
- Voice Mix - similar to the Arrange Album, but featuring dialogue sampled from the Japanese version of the game along with the music.

The limited edition of Volume 1 also came with a box to hold all four albums.

When the game was revised into the Director's Cut, Sakuraba composed a few new pieces of music and released an album for them.

The song "The Small Bird That Forgot How To Fly" (飛び方を忘れた小さな鳥, Tobikata Wo Wasureta Chiisana Tori) by the JPop singer Misia was used to accompany the game's ending credits.

== Reception ==
Reception

Aggregate scores
Aggregator	Score
GameRankings	PS2: 81%
Metacritic	PS2: 80/100; PS4: 72/100

Review scores
Publication	Score
Famitsu	32/40
Game Informer	8.25/10
GameSpot	7.9/10
IGN	9/10

Initially, the game received a somewhat negative impression in Japan. Parts of the game were alleged to be buggy, and the game refused to work at all in older SCPH-10000 PlayStation 2s. Enix blamed Sony, as they had coded Star Ocean 3 with features from updated libraries that were apparently not backward-compatible. Sony denied all responsibility. Regardless, it impacted the game's sales, and Enix released the Director's Cut in 2004 to assuage grievances about the original by fixing the bugs and adding features.

In North America, the game was initially well received among both critics and players, with GameRankings, a compilation of critical reviews, giving it an average score of 80.99%. Star Ocean 3 was the 96th-best seller among console games of the PS2/GameCube/Xbox generation as of July 2006; it had estimated U.S. sales of 630,000 copies, with revenues of $23 million. In Japan, the original release sold 533,373 in 2003, while the Director's Cut sold 207,881 copies between 2004 and 2009, bringing worldwide sales to 1,371,254 units. IGN placed Till the End of Time at number 58 on their "Top 100 PlayStation 2 Games" list.
