= Shima Shima Tora no Shimajirō =

Japanese anime television series

Shima Shima Tora no Shimajirō (しましまとらのしまじろう; lit. "Striped Island Tiger Shimajirō") is a 1993 Japanese children's slice of life anime series primarily aimed at preschoolers, animated by Pierrot Plus. It is directed by veteran director Hisayuki Toriumi, who directed Science Ninja Team Gatchaman and character designs by Shigehito Tsuji of Doraemon fame. It aired at TV Setouchi and in all TXN TV networks in Japan from December 13, 1993, to March 31, 2008, having a total of 726 episodes.

The series is officially based on the Kodomo Challenge Educational Learning Program created by Benesse in 1988 aimed primarily to preschoolers, which Shimajirō serves as the official mascot. The anime is listed as one of the most popular Educational Preschool shows in Japan, with having a total of 8 seasons that continues to 3 anime sequels. It was widely popular among children, parents and adults, gaining a decent fanbase over the years.

== Overview ==
Shima Shima Tora no Shimajirō was officially created after Benesse and TV Setouchi both decided to adapt the Learning Program series into a full-pledged series for television, with part of the staff being former Tatsunoko Production director Hisayuki Toriumi and music composer Shin'ya Naitō. It was officially animated by Studio Pierrot's sister company, Pierrot Plus and premiered on December 13, 1993. The series ended after it aired its final episode on March 31, 2008, as the second series aired, alongside the children's variety series Hakken Taiken Daisuki! Shimajirō (はっけん たいけん だいすき! しまじろう; lit. "Discover Experience Love! Shimajirō"). All of the later episodes of the series were aired in the variety series in the later years which also includes live action segments.

=== Theme and elements ===
The overall theme surrounding the series all revolves in Shimajirō's life as a preschooler and all the lessons he needs to learn in a daily basis such as making friends, saying sorry, making a resolve and others that reflects to the preschool demographic. Also educational elements such as planting flowers, how to use the toilet for the first time, helping others and learning in kindergarten is also applied.

The anime's overall elements are all based on the Kodomo Challenge series, with the storyline being completely original from the source material.

=== Setting ===
The anime is officially set in the fictional Challenge Island (ちゃれんじ島, Charenji shima) located somewhere in the world. The island is a bit sururban with cities and towns and is very self-sufficient in resources. Various anthropomorphic animals live in this island alongside the main characters. Also, various animal characters in the island vary as well as their culture such as the Mole People who live under the island or the Squirrel people who always hibernate during winter. Various means of transport as well as subways exist in the island.

Aside from the animal characters, some characters such as Witches and Fairies exist in the island.

== Story ==
The entire series focuses on Shimajirō Shimano, a curious tiger boy living in Challenge Island. Being the second in the family, he attends Kindergarten alongside his friends as they all discover everything around them, and learn valuable lessons as they grow up.

== Characters ==
=== Main characters ===
Shimajirō Shimano (縞野 しまじろう, Shimano Shimajirō)
Voiced by: Chisato Nakajima (First Series), Omi Minami (Current Series)

The series's main protagonist, Shimajirō is a male tiger cub born in May 5 at exactly 5:55 PM and is the oldest of the Shimano siblings. His blood type is O. He is a bright little boy who likes doughnuts and playing soccer. He fears thunder and ghost stories, and doesn't like to eat green peppers. He is very supportive to his friends and to his younger sister Hana, but can sometimes be a bit stubborn.

Mimirin Midorihara (緑原 みみりん, Midorihara Mimirin)
Voiced by: Naoko Watanabe (First Series), Miki Takahashi (Current Series)

One of Shimajirō's childhood friends, Mimirin is a white rabbit girl with back ear tips who is born at October 10 at exactly 10:10 AM. Her Blood Type is B. Living in a family of Florists, Mimirin loves cute things and strawberry shortcake as well as running. However she has fear of insects and is never fond of carrots. Usually she also has an overbite and her tail appears out of her skirt. She can be nice but spoiled, selfish and clumsy and has a habit on crying if someone doesn't favor her opinion sometimes. Mimirin is also a good aspiring singer as well and also likes to be a princess. She was one of two characters in the series (the other being Ramurin) to not have an older sibling, but after Ramurin left Challenge Island in the series finale of Shimajirō Hesoka, Mimirin became the only one.

Torippii Sorano (空野 とりっぴい, Sorano Torippii)
Voiced by: Yūko Mita (First Series), Takumi Yamazaki (Current Series)

Also one of Shimajirō's childhood friends, Torippī is a male green parrot who's born in January 1 at 7:00 am. His blood type is O. He usually has red, blue and yellow feathers on his head and has few tail feathers on his back, as well as a loose tongue. In earlier series, he is half naked, but wears shorts at the start of Shimajirō no Wow. His name in the series is always mispronounced in several promotional materials. Torippii is an aspiring singer, however he is somehow tone-deaf. He usually likes Takoyaki but like Shimajirō, he is easily scared of thunder, ghost stories and lastly by ghosts. Unlike the other characters, Torippī has an ability to fly to the sky to survey things for his friends, and also can understand bird-language. He usually lives with his grandmother and parents in a treehouse and is the oldest of the four siblings.

Ramurin Makiba (牧場 らむりん, Makiba Ramurin)
Voiced by: Chisato Nakajima (First Series, earlier Seasons), Hinako Yoshino (First Series, later Seasons), Saori Sugimoto (Current Series)

Also one of Shimajirō's childhood friends, Ramurin is a pink sheep girl who is born on March 3 in exactly 3:03 am. Her Blood Type is AB. Unlike other sheep, she herself doesn't have a white face. She initially wore a bow on her head but replaced it with a bandana in later episodes. Her own father is a painter, and aspires her to become one when she grows up one day. She loves Pudding, but she has fears of ghosts and she is not good at running fast. She also likes both sports Judo and Sumo. Unlike the other characters, Ramurin's mentality is much higher than the rest of the main cast and usually behaves like a responsible sister. Her catch phrase is "suspicious" and usually keeps her promises sometimes. Like Mimirin, she doesn't have any older sibling. She officially left Challenge Island along with her father during the last episode of Shimajirō Hesoka, and moved to France to achieve her goals.

Nyakkii Momoyama (桃山 にゃっきい, Momoyama Nyakkii)
Voiced by: Saori Sugimoto

First introduced in Shimajirō no Wow!, Nyakkii is a pink-furred cat with a cream-colored face who is born on April 4 at exactly 4:00 AM. Her Blood Type is A. She loves climbing trees, foot racing and sports, and dreams to become an Olympic athlete one day when she grows up. She moved into Challenge Island with her grandmother, mother and her younger brother and befriended Shimajirō and the others in the second episode. Her father, however, lives separately somewhere in Challenge Island, away from her and her family.

=== Shimano Family ===
Shimatarō Shimano (縞野 しまたろう, Shimano Shimatarō)
Voiced by: Chafurin

Sakura Shimano (縞野 さくら, Shimano Sakura)
Voiced by: Kikuko Inoue (Current), Emi Shinohara (Episodes 205-230)

Hana Shimano (縞野 はな, Shimano Hana)
Voiced by: Miki Takahashi

Sumire Shimano (縞野 すみれ, Shimano Sumire)
Voiced by: Nozomi Takatsuki

Shimakichi Shimano (縞野 しまきち, Shimano Shimakichi)
Voiced by: Takashi Nagasako

Tommy (トミー, Tomī)
Voiced by: Chika Sakamoto

=== Midorihara Family ===
Sōta Midorihara (緑原 草太, Midorihara Sōta)
Voiced by: Bin Shimada

Renge Midorihara (緑原 れんげ, Midorihara Renge)
Voiced by: Shinobu Adachi

=== Sorano Family ===
Torigorō Sorano (空野 とりごろう, Sorano Torigorō)
Voiced by: Eiji Ito

Kanae Sorano (空野 かなえ, Sorano Kanae)
Voiced by: Mami Horikoshi

Michiyo Sorano (空野 みちよ, Sorano Michiyo)
Voiced by: Sayuri Yamauchi (Early Seasons), Hiroko Nishi (Shimajirō no Wow!)

Toto Sorano (空野 とと, Sorano Toto), Riri Sorano (空野 りり, Sorano Riri) and Pipi Sorano (空野 ぴぴ, Sorano Pipi)
Voiced by: Takumi Yamazaki

=== Makiba Family ===
Matsusei Makiba (牧場 まっせい, Makiba Matsusei)
Voiced by: Nobuo Tobita

Yumeko Makiba (牧場 ゆめこ, Makiba Yumeko)
Voiced by: Yuko Kobayashi

=== Momoyama Family ===
Nene Momoyama (桃山 ねね, Momoyama Nene)
Voiced by: Akemi Obata

Yoriko Momoyama (桃山 よりこ, Momoyama Yoriko)
Voiced by: Yuko Kobayashi

Niisuke Momoyama (桃山 にいすけ, Momoyama Niisuke)
Voiced by: Yuki

=== Challenge Island Kindergarten Students ===
Zōta Ikeno (いけの ぞうた, Ikeno Zōta)
Voiced by: Aki Sasamori

Kanta Kabayama (かばやま かんた, Kabayama Kanta)
Voiced by: Yū Maruyama

Monta Kimura (きむら もんた, Kimura Monta)
Voiced by: Megumi Sōkawa

Kirinta Kusano (くさの きりんた, Kusano Kirinta)
Voiced by: Maina Shimagata

Sakurako Koinuma (こいぬま さくらこ, Koinuma Sakurako)
Voiced by: Yū Maruyama

Kento Koshiba (こしば けんと, Koshiba Kento)
Voiced by: Chinatsu Akazaki

Marurin Sasaki (ささき まるりん, Sasaki Marurin)
Voiced by: Aki Toyosaki

Būta Tonda (とんだ ぶうた, Tonda Būta)
Voiced by: Akiko Toda

Kikko Hayashida (はやしだ きっこ, Hayashida Kikko)
Voiced by: Mai Hirano

Taro (たろ)

Gonta (ごんた)

Nyamie (にゃみえ)

=== The Black Cat Triplets ===
Dot (ドット, Dotto)
Voiced by: Bin Shimada

Karakusa (からくさ, Karakusa)
Voiced by: Nobuo Tobita

Paisley (ペイズリー, Peizurī)
Voiced by: Shinobu Adachi

=== Kindergarten Faculty ===
Ms. Inuko (いぬこ先生, Inuko-sensei)
Voiced by: Megumi Sōkawa

Ms. Shikako Shikano (しかの しかこ先生, Shikano Shikako-sensei)
Voiced by: Chinatsu Akasaki

Ms. Kūko (くうこ先生, Kūko-sensei)

Mr. Kumagorō (くまごろう先生, Kumagorō-sensei)

Principal (園長先生, Enchō-sensei)
Voiced by: Mitsuaki Hoshino

=== Supporting Characters ===
Dr. Mee Mee (メエメエ博士, Mēmē hakase)
Voiced by: Nobuo Tobita

Matte (マッテくん, Matte-kun)
Voiced by: Sumi Shimamoto

Datte (ダッテくん, Datte-kun)
Voiced by: Chika Sakamoto

Jean (ジャン, Jan)
Voiced by: Aki Sasamori

Ken (ケン)
Voiced by: Akiko Toda

Pontarō (ぽん太郎, Pontarō)
Voiced by: Yuki Matsuoka

Hitsujii (ひつじい, Hitsujii)
Voiced by: Mitsuru Ogata

Mr. GaoGao (ガオガオさん, Gaogao-san)
Voiced by: Minoru Inaba

Ms. Tamako (たま子先生, Tamako-sensei)
Voiced by: Kumi Yamakado (Early Seasons), Tomoka Kuzutani (Late Seasons)

Nono (ののちゃん, Nono-chan)
Voiced by: Aki Toyosaki

Tsumurin (つむりん, Tsumurin)
Voiced by: Makoto Naruse

Nororin (のろりん, Nororin)
Voiced by: Daiki Nakamura

Maruo (マルオ, Maruo)
Voiced by: Bin Shimada

Sankaku (サンカク, Sankaku)
Voiced by: Nobuo Tobita

Shikaku (シカク, Shikaku)
Voiced by: Shinobu Adachi

Richard (リチャード, Richādo)
Voiced by: Katsumi Toriumi

Grandma Mei (メイばあさん, Mei-bāsan)
Voiced by: Yoko Soumi

Sei (セイさん, Sei-san)
Voiced by: Toshitsugu Takashina

Ratman (ラットマン, Rattoman)
Voiced by: Eiji Hanawa

Jiji (ジジ, Jiji)
Voiced by: Kazumasa Katsura

== Music ==
The official music of the series is composed by Shin'ya Naitō in the first series and by Akifumi Tada of Tenchi Muyo! GXP in the later series.

The series officially has 7 Opening Songs and 7 Ending Songs. For the first series, the first opening is titled Shima Torando Island (しまとらンドアイランド, Shima torando airando) by Shima Shima Kids and the second Opening is titled Skip Step Island (スキップステップアイランド, Sukippu suteppu airando) by Omi Minami. The ending songs are titled Zutto Motto Daisuki (ずっともっと大好き, Zutto Motto Daisuki) by Shima Shima Kids, the second ending titled Happy Jam Jam (ハッピー・ジャムジャム, Happī jamu jamu) by M.S.J and the third ending is titled Nyanda Korya (にゃんだこりゃ, Nyanda korya) by both Omi Minami and Bin Shimada

For Hakken Taiken Daisuki! Shimajirō, the opening theme is titled Mainichi Challenger (まいにちチャレンジャー, Mai ni chi charenjā; lit. Everyday Challenger) by Omi Minami, Miki Takahashi, Takumi Yamazaki and Saori Sugimoto. The ending song is titled Happy Jam Jam (ハッピー・ジャムジャム, Happī jamu jamu), also by Omi Minami, Miki Takahashi, Takumi Yamazaki and Saori Sugimoto.

For Shimajirō Hesoka, the first opening is titled Sora Sora ☆ Aozora (ソラソラ☆あおぞら, Sora sora ☆ aozora) by Aki Toyosaki and the second opening is titled Rainbow (レインボー, Reinbō) by Yusuke Kamiji. The first ending song is titled Shima Mimi to Rira mutsu (しまみみとりらむっ, Shima Mimi to Rira mutsu) by Fusanosuke Kondō and the second ending theme is Happy Jam Jam (He So Ka Version) (ハッピー・ジャムジャム （He So Kaバージョン）, Happī jamu jamu (He So Ka bājon)) by Tomomi Ukumori

For Shimajirō no Wow!, the first opening is titled Bokura no hoshi no Miracle (ボクらのほしのミラクル, Bokura no hoshi no mirakuru) by Daudi Joseph and the second opening is titled Shimajirō to ikou yo (しまじろうと いこうよ, Shimajirō to ikou yo) by HARCO. The ending theme is titled Tomodachi no Wow! (トモダチのわお!, Tomodachi no wao!) by Puffy AmiYumi.

== International versions of television stations ==
=== Hong Kong ===
- TVB Jade.

=== Japan ===
- TV Setouchi.
- TV Tokyo.

=== Vietnam ===
- Long An Radio and Television Station - LA34. (May 2009 - December 2011)
- Bac Lieu Radio and Television Station - BTV. (January 2012 - August 2014)

== Address ==
=== Benesse Corporation ===
==== Japan ====
- House 1: Kita-ku, Okayama City, Okayama Prefecture, Japan.

==== Taiwan ====
- House 2: 10th Floor, No.49 Guanchian Rd, Taipei City, Taiwan.

=== Local Radio and Television Station ===
- House 1: No.125 National Highway 1A Street, Ward 4, Tan An City, Long An Province.
- House 2: No.410 August 23 Street, Ward 8, Bac Lieu City, Bac Lieu Province.

== Newspaper ==
=== Southwest, Mekong Delta ===
- Long An Newspaper.
- Bac Lieu Newspaper.

== Children ==
=== List of children DVD ===
==== China ====
- Qiaohu Baby Edition. (1-2 years old)
- Qiaohu Toddler Edition. (2-3 years old)
- Qiaohu Happy Edition. (3-4 years old)
- Qiaohu Growth Edition. (4-5 years old)
- Qiaohu Learning Edition. (5-6 years old)
- Qiaohu Rainbow Edition. (6-7 years old)

==== Japan ====
- Shimajiro Petit. (1-2 years old)
- Shimajiro Pocket. (2-3 years old)
- Shimajiro Pop. (3-4 years old)
- Shimajiro Step. (4-5 years old)
- Shimajiro Jump. (5-6 years old)

==== Taiwan ====
- Qiaohu Baby Edition. (1-2 years old)
- Qiaohu Toddler Edition. (2-3 years old)
- Qiaohu Happy Edition. (3-4 years old)
- Qiaohu Growth Edition. (4-5 years old)
- Qiaohu Learning Edition. (5-6 years old)
- Qiaohu Elementary School Student.
- Qiaohu ABC Bubbles.

== Company ==
=== China ===
- Benesse Corporation.
- Qiaohu.

=== Japan ===
- Benesse Corporation.
- Shimajiro.

=== Taiwan ===
- Benesse Corporation.

== Online ==
=== Games ===
- Qiaohu Games.

== Critical reception ==
On its first airing, Shima Shima Tora no Shimajirō became TV Setouchi's most popular educational anime show in Japan, rivaling NHK's long running Okaasan to Issho. The series became most popular in the Kanto Region of Japan, and became Benesse's most successful adaptation of the Kodomo Challenge series. Reruns of the episodes are broadcast on other stations such as Kids Station and TV Tokyo, respectively.

=== Mascot popularity ===
The anime also made Shimajirō one of the most iconic Anime Characters in Japan for preschoolers, rivaling Anpanman in terms of ratings. On his initial release. He was widely appeared in various Kodomo Challenge products and products from other companies and sponsors. Also, Tomica and Benesse created a limited edition "Shimajiro Car" that is limitedly distributed to Kodomo Challenge members all over Japan. Japanese car company Toyota created a life-sized replica of the Tomica model, titled the "426GT Shimajirō Car" which is a Customized Toyota Estima Hybrid. In 2013, a new version of the car is released by called "426EV Shimajirō Car II", based on the Tesla Model S. Tomica released a model version of the car under the name "Dream Car Tomica Shimajiro II" on February 2014 for Kodomo Challenge members and a retail release on March 2014.

=== Overseas Popularity ===
Shima Shima Tora no Shimajirō is officially released in various TV stations all across the world, excluding the United States. The Chinese dubbed version was known as Qiao Hu (Chinese: 巧虎; pinyin: qiǎo hǔ). In China it is known for having "...thoughtful and scrupulous tutoring methods, as well as elaborate educational materials." The show contains cartoons as well as acted out portions that feature the signature tiger mascot as well as a rabbit and a few actors.

According to another source, the firm which sponsored the character has franchises in Beijing and Shanghai which has been considered "successful" by many parents for its ability to inspire children with "good character" amid China's recent social issues. This idea is further reinforced as it teaches children "how to love to learn" "build positive personality and good habit", addressing the need in children's different stages of learning. In 2014, the firm plans big staging events in Beijing under the title "Dawn of the Adventure Island" in Beijing's Haidian Theater. The anticipated event is notable in that it is one of the first shows targeted towards an audience of children rather than"... conventional justice evil drama of violence and adult language of thinking... ", which is referring to another children's show called "Xi Yang Yang. According to Amazon.com, the franchise was released on DVD in the year 2010.

== Image ==
=== South Central Coast, Mekong Delta ===
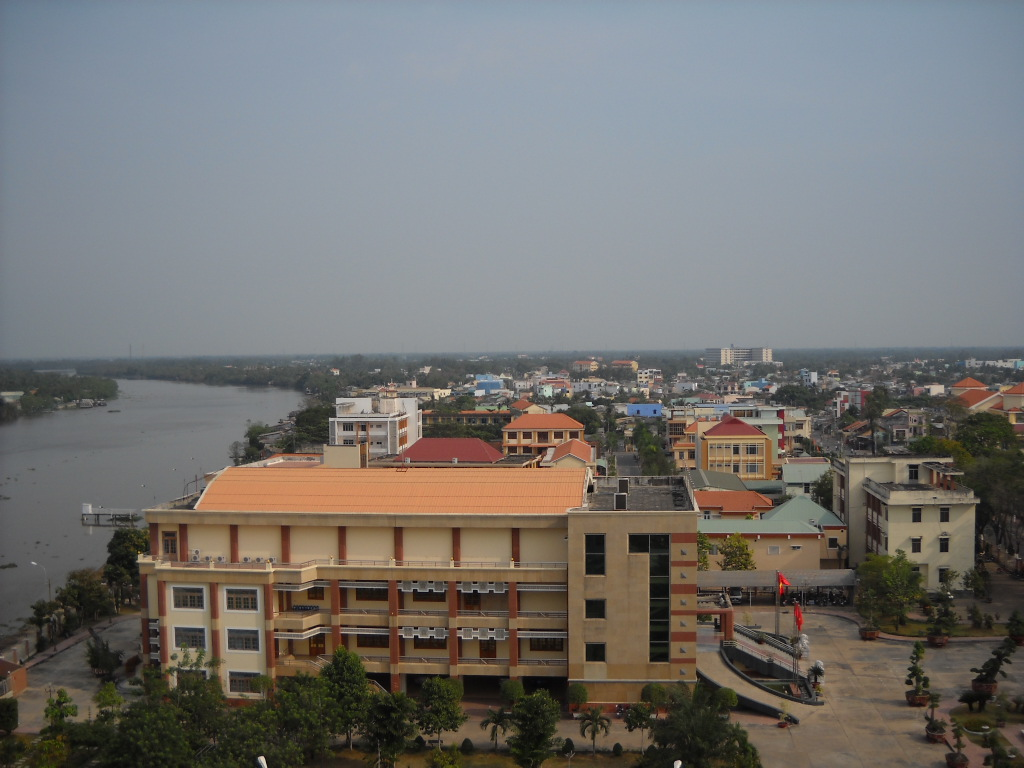
A corner of Tan An city Tan An city, Long An province.

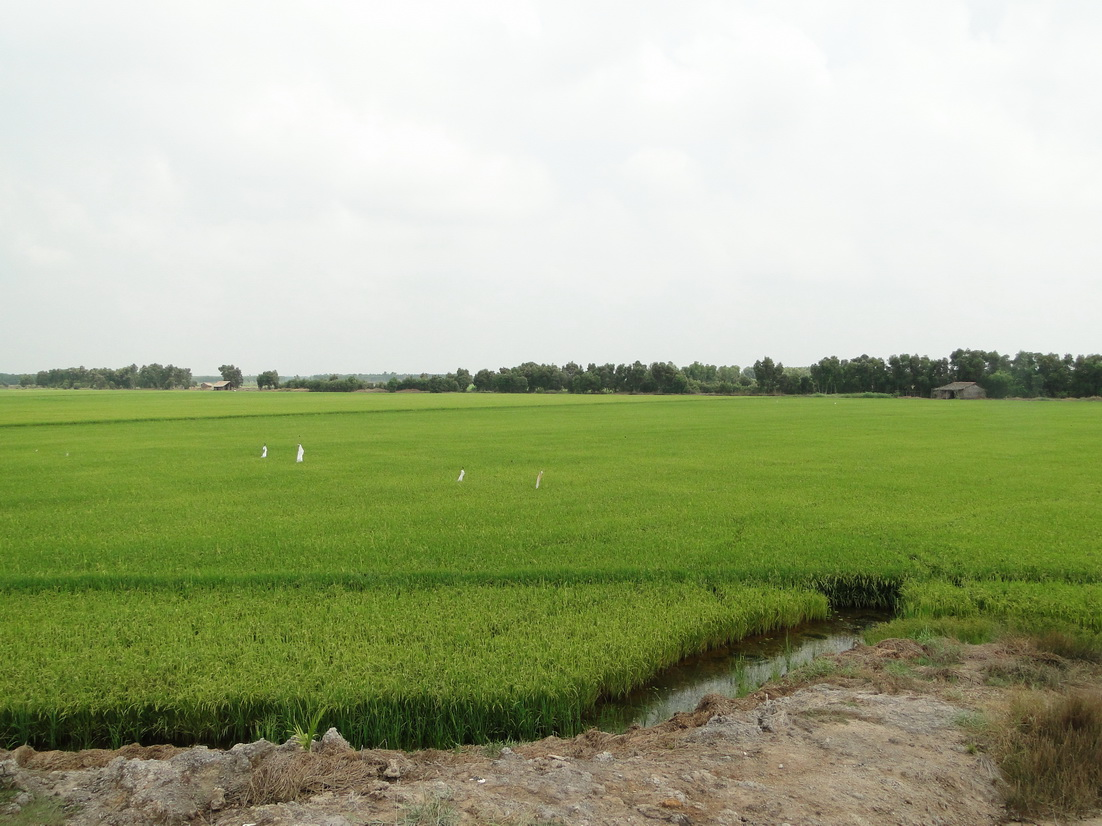
Rice field Moc Hoa district, Long An province.

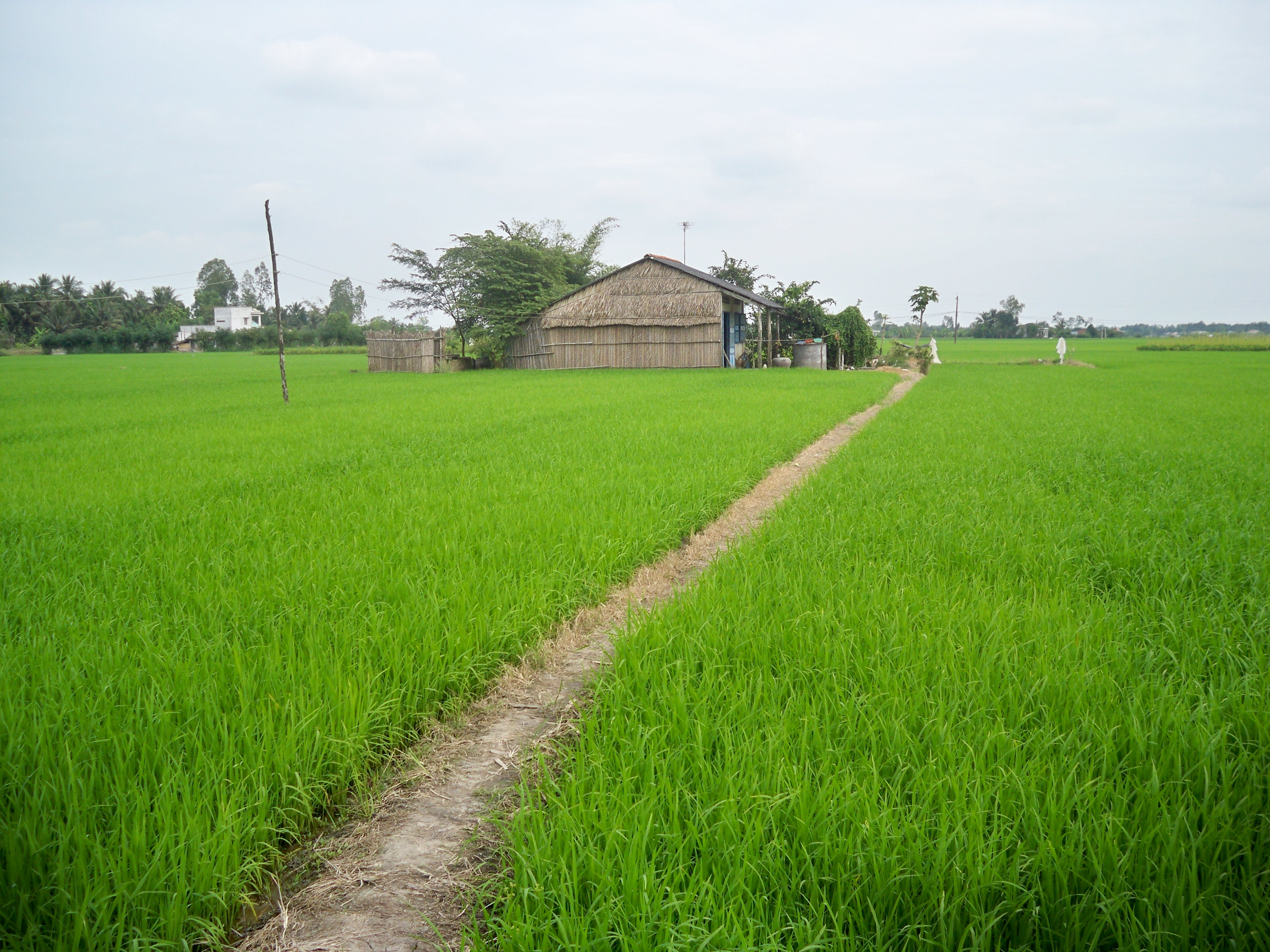
Lush green rice fields Chau Thanh district, Long An province.

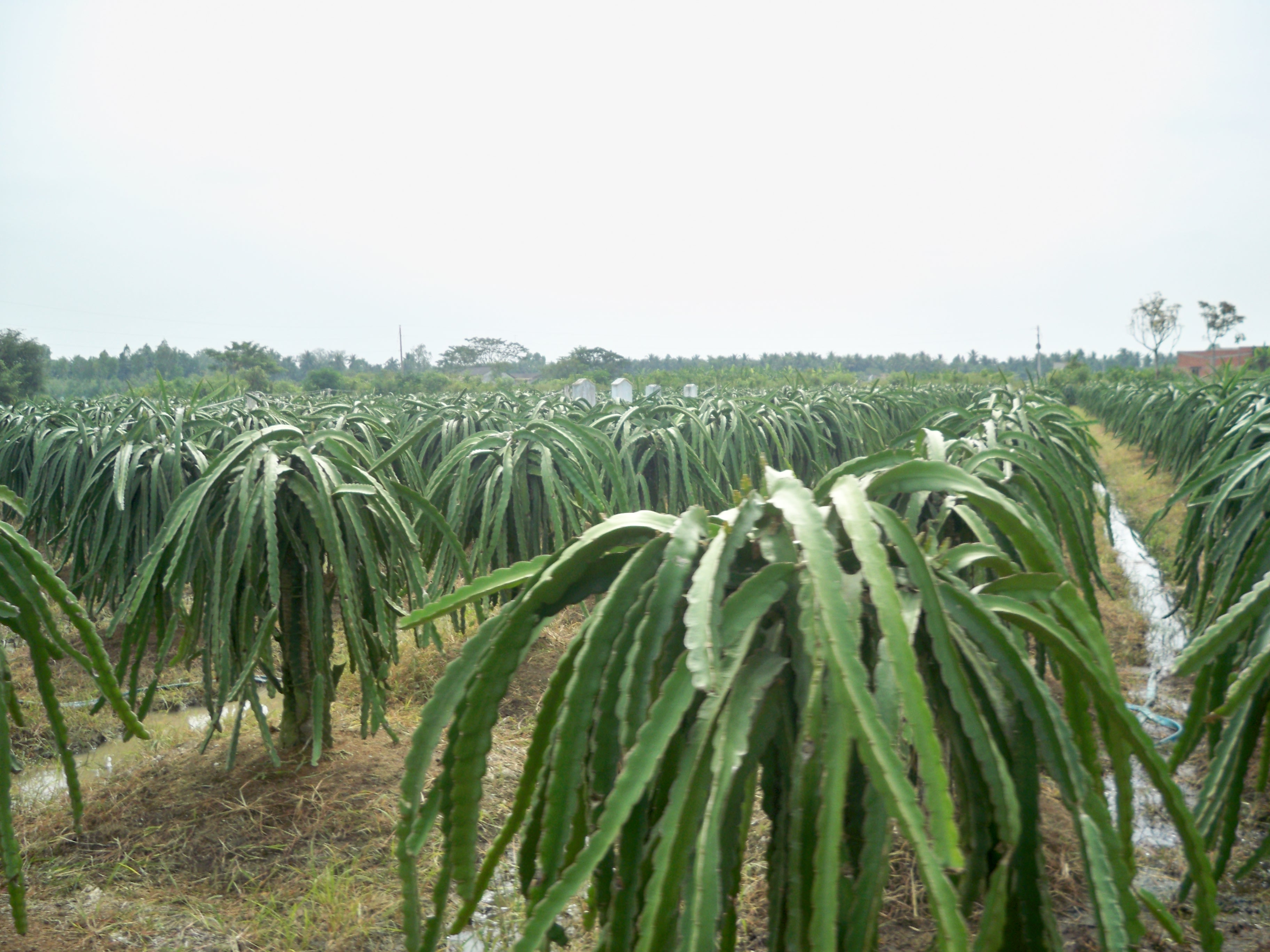
Dragon fruit tree Chau Thanh district, Long An province.

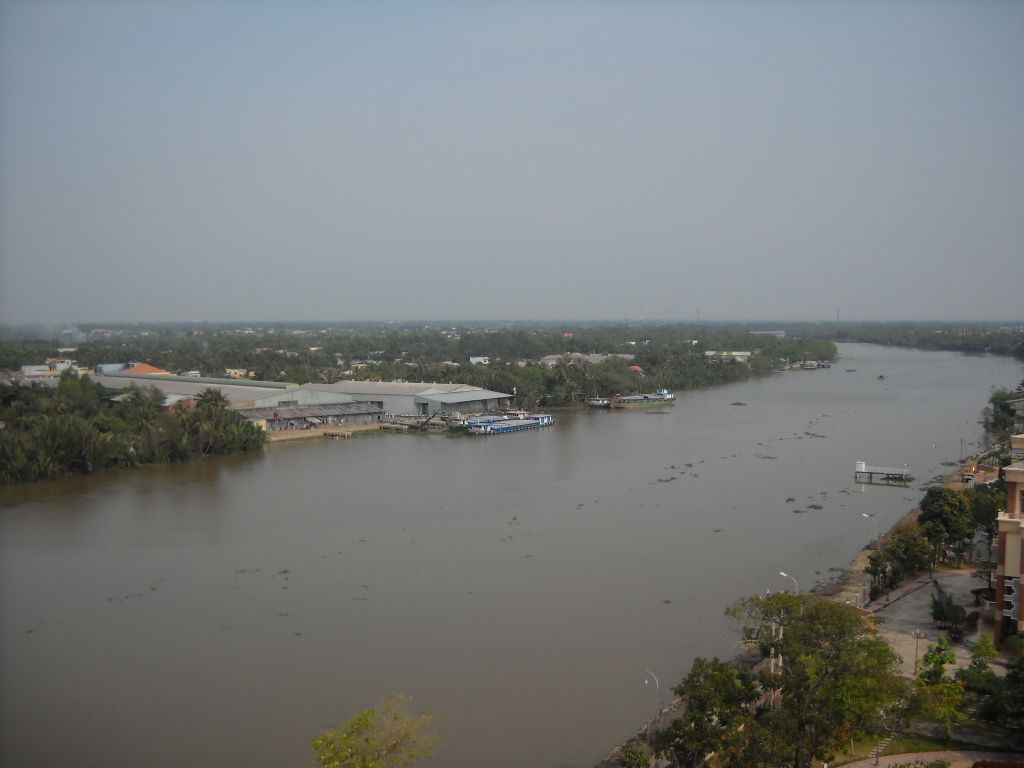
Vam Co Tay River

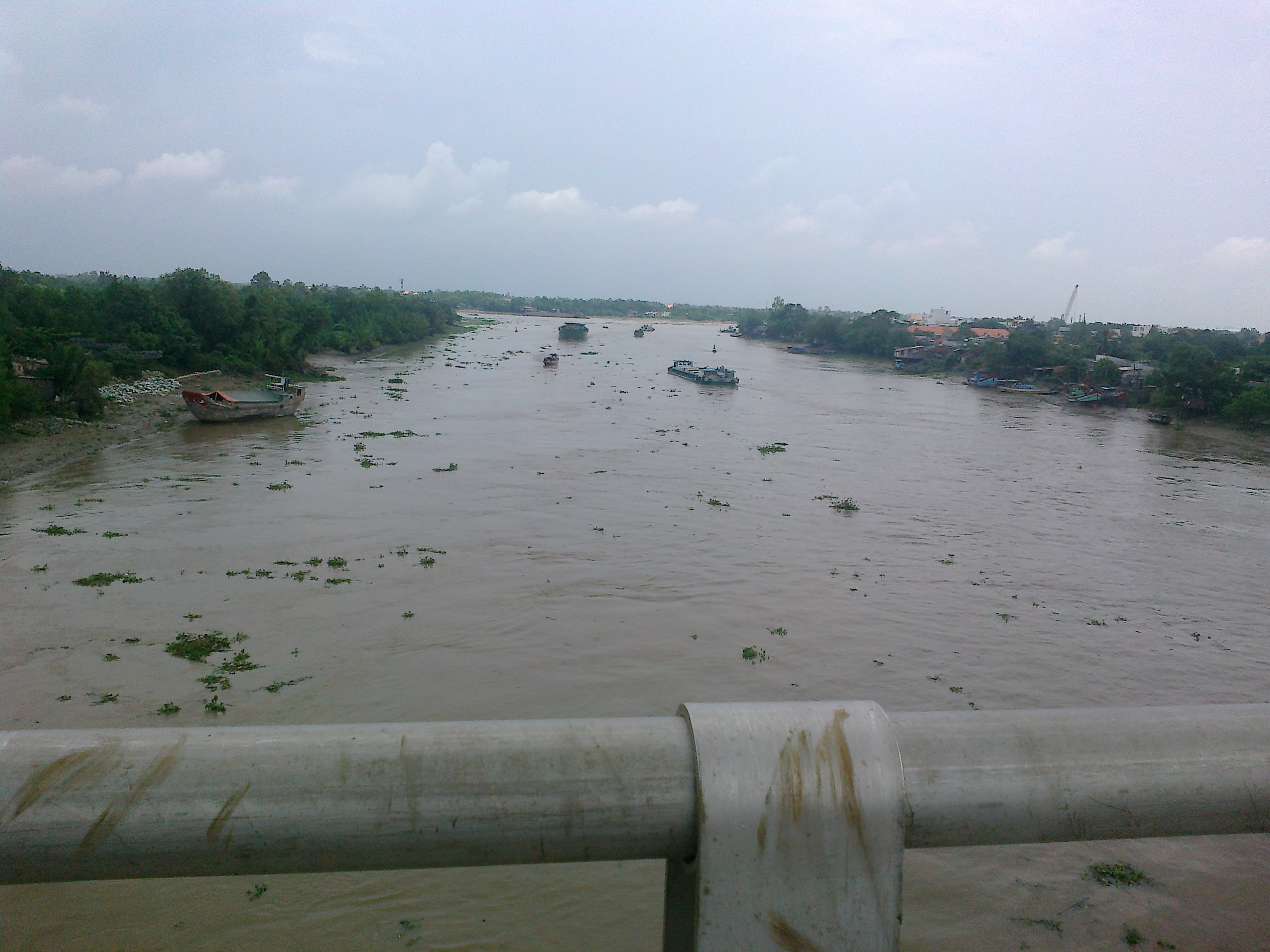
Saltwater Canal Can Duoc district, Long An province.

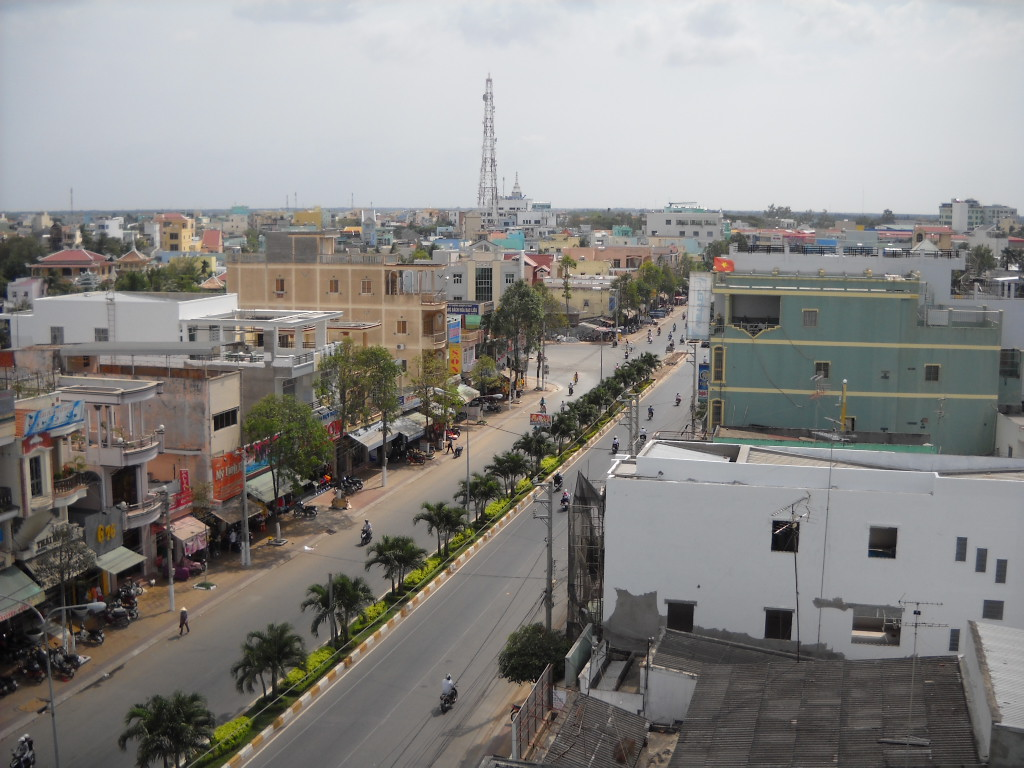
A corner of Bac Lieu city Bac Lieu city, Bac Lieu province.

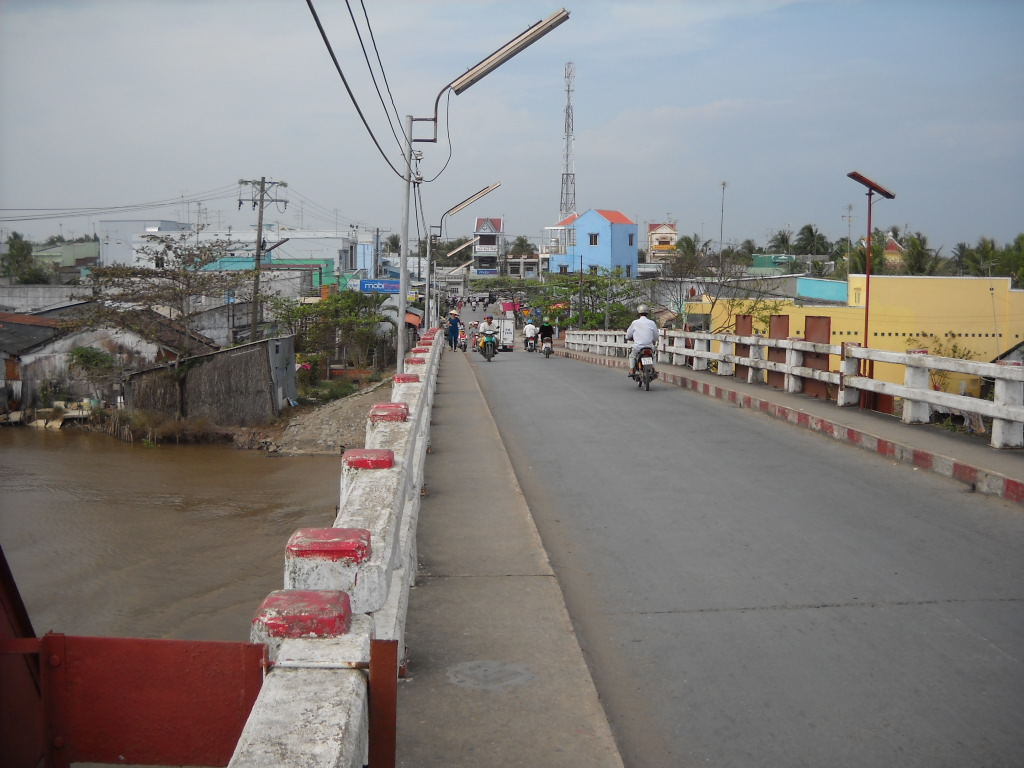
Gia Rai Town Gia Rai town, Bac Lieu province.

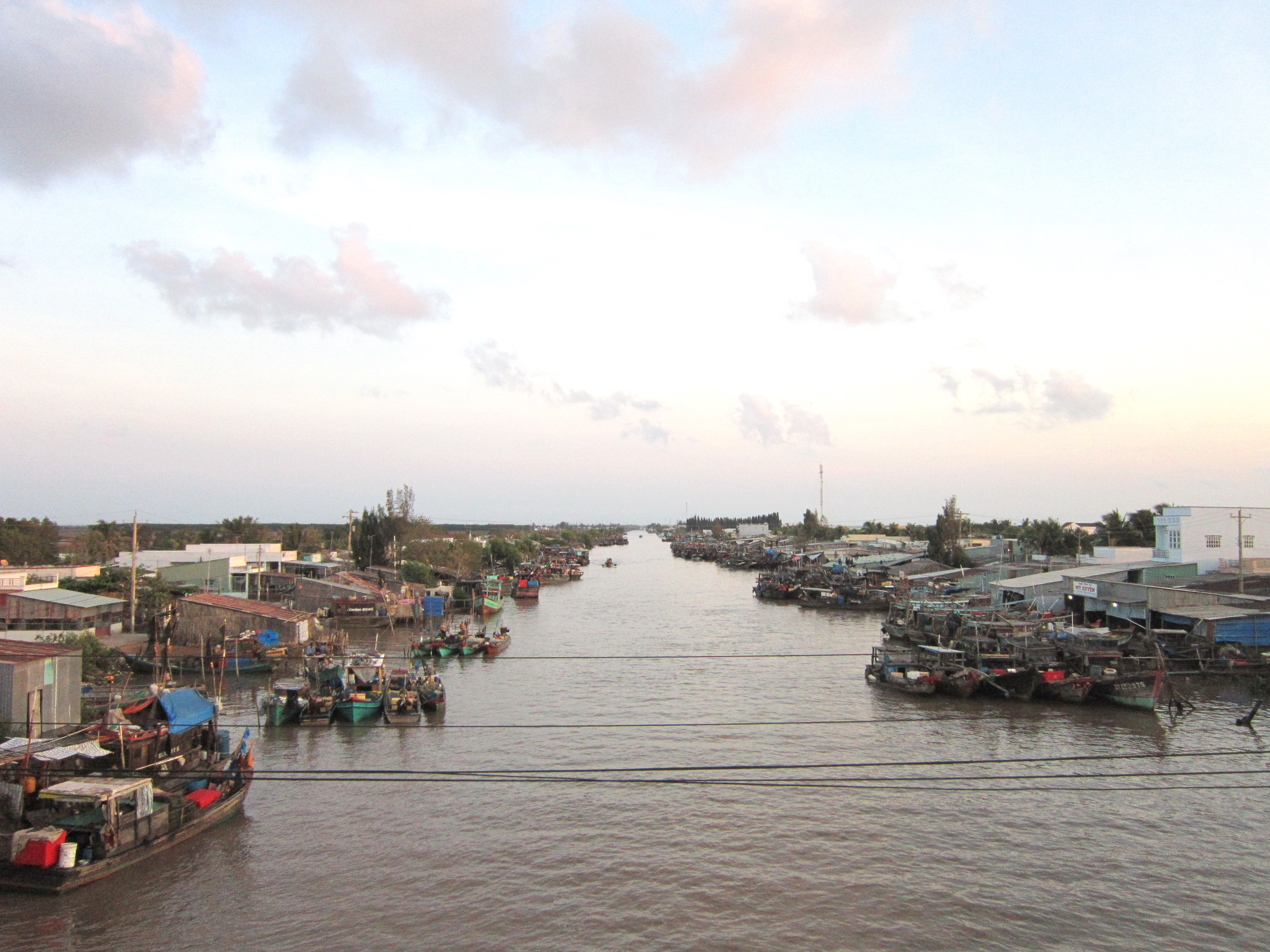
Nha Mat Canal Bac Lieu city, Bac Lieu province.

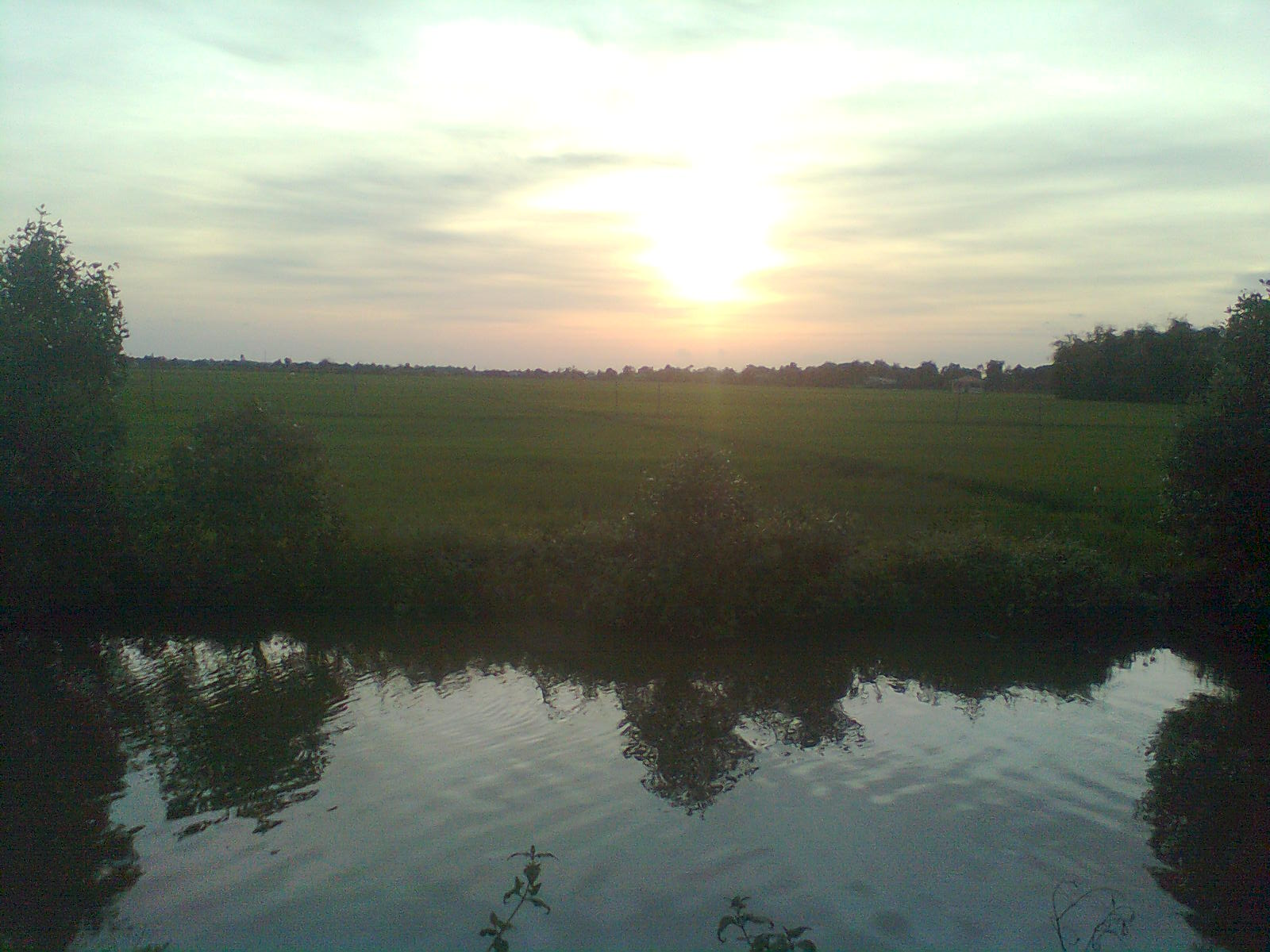
Rice fields Hoa Binh district, Bac Lieu province.
