= 正代 =

正代, meaning “right, generation”, is a Japanese name, may refer to:

- Masayo, Japanese feminine given name
- Shōdai, Japanese surname
