= Mausu Promotion =

Japanese talent agency

Mausu Promotion Co., Ltd.
- Native name: 株式会社マウスプロモーション
- Romanized name: Kabushiki-gaisha Mausu Puromōshon
- Formerly: Ezaki Production Ltd. (1974-2000)
- Type: Kabushiki kaisha
- Industry: Voice talent
- Founded: April 8, 1974
- Headquarters: Shinjuku, Shinjuku, Tokyo, Japan
- Services: Talent management
- Website: mausu.net

Mausu Promotion (株式会社マウスプロモーション, Kabushiki-gaisha Mausu Puromōshon), formerly known as Ezaki Productions, is a Japanese talent management agency representing a number of prolific voice actors.

== History ==
The agency's predecessor, Ezaki Jimusho (江崎事務所), was founded in 1969 by the manager Kaneo Ezaki (江崎加子男), renamed Ezaki Production in 1974, and renamed Mausu Promotion in 2000. By then the founder had decided to retire and handed the company to Mitsue Naya, the wife of voice actor Rokurō Naya. As both were born in the Year of the Rat, they first considered the name "Two Mouse", then shortened it to "Mouse" (Mausu) after learning that a shop in the Kabukichō area already used the original name.

== Attached voice actors ==
=== Male ===
- Shinya Fukumatsu
- Kenji Hamada
- Mitsuhiro Ichiki
- Atsushi Imaruoka
- Kentarō Itō
- Kengo Kawanishi
- Ryūichi Kijima
- Naomi Kusumi
- Junpei Morita
- Toshihiro Nakamura
- Mitsuru Ogata
- Tōru Ōkawa
- Yuta Sato
- Tarusuke Shingaki
- Atsushi Tamaru
- Masaki Terasoma

=== Female ===
- Fairouz Ai
- Nozomi Furuki
- Sawako Hata
- Kyoko Hikami
- Masayo Hosono
- Hiromi Igarashi
- Ai Kakuma
- Yoshiko Kamei
- Ayumi Kida
- Sachiko Kojima
- Yūki Kuwahara
- Yuki Masuda
- Nanako Mori
- Michiyo Murase
- Ayuru Ōhashi
- Akemi Okamura
- Yūko Ōno
- Ikue Ōtani
- Riho Sugiyama
- Yūki Takada
- Ikuko Tani
- Asuka Tanii
- Risa Tsubaki
- Ayumi Tsuji
- Seiko Yoshida

== Formerly attached voice actors ==
=== Male ===
- Yousuke Akimoto (now attached with Office PAC)
- Daisuke Gori (died in 2010 after moving to Aoni Production)
- Mitsuaki Hoshino (attached with Arts Vision)
- Yoshimasa Hosoya (on freelance now)
- Takanobu Hozumi (died in 2018 while attached)
- Atsushi Ii (died in 2020 after moving to Arts Vision)
- Akira Ishida (attached with Peerless Gerbera)
- Makoto Ishii (attached with Remax)
- Yasuo Iwata (died in 2009 while attached)
- Yasuyuki Kase (attached with Office Osawa)
- Masayuki Katō (died in 1993 while attached)
- Yuuji Kishi (attached with CUBCE Inc.)
- Koichi Kitamura (died in 2007 while attached)
- Takaya Kuroda (attached with AXL-One)
- Yasumichi Kushida (died in 2023 while attached)
- Mitsuaki Madono (attached with Aoni Production)
- Rokuro Naya (died in 2014 while attached)
- Tamio Ohki (died in 2017 while attached)
- Yōsuke Naka (died in 2023 while attached)
- Daisuke Ono (on freelance now)
- Akio Ōtsuka (on freelance)
- Shuuhei Sakaguchi (attached with Aksent)
- Shunsuke Shima (died in 2003 after moving to Aoni Production)
- Toshitaka Shimizu (died in 2003 while attached)
- Masakazu Suzuki (attached with Aksent)
- Akimitsu Takase (attached with Aksent)
- Hideyuki Tanaka (attached with Aoni Production)
- Tomohiro Tsuboi (attached with 81 Produce)
- Masaaki Tsukada (died in 2014 while attached)
- Yōji Ueda (attached with Amuleto)
- Hideo Watanabe (attached with Libertad)
- Naoki Yanagi (attached with FreeMarch.inc)

=== Female ===
- Kiyomi Asai (attached with Dee Color)
- Kikuko Inoue (attached with Velvet as a narrator and Office Anemone as a voice actress)
- Ayako Ito
- Hitomi Hase (on freelance now)
- Naoko Kouda (on freelance now)
- Marika Kouno (attached with Aoni Production)
- Tomoyo Kurosawa (attached with Toho Geino)
- Suzuka Morita (on freelance now)
- Nozomi Nishida (on freelance now)
- Miyuki Sawashiro (attached with Aoni Production)
- Saori Seto (on freelance now)
- Yōko Sōmi (now attached with Kakehi Production)
- Atsuko Tanaka (died in 2024 while attached)
- Makoto Tsumura
- Ayano Yamamoto (attached with Amuleto)

== Mausu Promotion-influenced works ==
- Boktai: The Sun Is in Your Hand
- Eureka Seven
- Heartwork: Symphony of Destruction
- Juuni Senshi Bakuretsu Eto Ranger
- Kannazuki no Miko
- Rakugo Tennyo Oyui
- Star Trek: The Next Generation (Japanese dub)
- xxxHolic
