= Akiko Toda =

Japanese voice actress

Akiko Toda (戸田 亜紀子, Toda Akiko; born February 4, 1973) is a Japanese voice actress from Kōchi Prefecture. She was formerly affiliated with Mausu Promotion, and is now affiliated with Mediaforce.

== Voice roles ==
=== Television animation ===
- Hakken Taiken Daisuki! Shimajirō (Ken)
- ReBoot (Enzo Matrix)
- Sorcerer Hunters (Girl)
- Transformers: Armada (Young Rad)
- Uninhabited Planet Survive! (Classmate #3)
- X-Men: Evolution (Wolfsbane, Jamie Madrox)

=== Video games ===
- Crash Boom Bang! (Tawna)
- Sakura Taisen V ~Saraba Itoshiki Hitoyo~ (Jinjin)
- Crash Bandicoot 4: It's About Time (Tawna)

=== Dubbing roles ===
- Blow (Young George Jung)
- Diagnosis: Murder (Amanda Bentley)
- Dude, Where's My Car? (Wilma)
- Gosford Park (Mabel)
- The Human Centipede (First Sequence) (Jenny (Ashlynn Yennie))
- Red Dragon (Billy Leeds, young Francis Dolarhyde)
- Shall We Dance? (Tina)
