= Atsushi Ii =

Japanese voice actor (1939–2020)

- Born: Yoshio Tanaka (田中義男, Tanaka Yoshio); January 1, 1939; Tokyo, Japan
- Died: March 21, 2020 (aged 81)
- Occupation: Voice actor
- Years active: 1969-2016

Atsushi Ii (伊井篤史, Ii Atsushi; born Yoshio Tanaka, January 1, 1939 – March 21, 2020) was a Japanese voice actor from Tokyo. He was formerly attached to Mausu Promotion and Production★A Gumi before settling at Arts Vision.

== Roles ==
=== Television animation ===
- GeGeGe no Kitarō (fourth series) (Grandpa)
- GeGeGe no Kitarō (fifth series) (Nichirō)
- Heroman (Stan)
- Hikaru no Go (Ochi's Grandfather)
- Hokuto no Ken 2 (Joseph, Coyote)
- Kidō Shinseiki Gundam X (Togusa)
- Majime ni Fumajime: Kaiketsu Zorori (Mayor Yagi)
- Rurō ni Kenshin: Meiji Kenkaku Romantan (Kōji Rudel)
- Saishū Heiki Kanojo (Kawahara)
- Soreike! Anpanman (Haioni, High Priest Tenpura)
- Soul Eater (Old Man)
- Street Fighter II V (Elder)
- Yomigaeru Sora – Rescue Wings (Kazuhiko Hirata)
- Gensomaden Saiyuki Instructor Wanga (episode 23)

=== Theatrical animation ===
- Sword of the Stranger (Byakuran)

=== Video games ===
- Kingdom Hearts Birth by Sleep (Horace Horsecollar, Scrooge McDuck)
- Rittai Ninja Katsugeki: Tenchū: Shinobi Gaisen (Yakurō Hikone)
- Rittai Ninja Katsugeki: Tenchū 2 (Kishū Gōda)

=== Dubbing roles ===
==== Live action ====
- Ali (Elijah Muhammad (Albert Hall))
- Armageddon (VHS/DVD edition) (Flight Director Clark (Chris Ellis))
- August (David Sterling (Rip Torn))
- Clear and Present Danger (John Clark (Willem Dafoe))
- Dancer in the Dark (Oldrich Novy)
- Dawn of the Dead (Commander)
- Donnie Brasco (Dean Blandford (Gerry Becker))
- Dragonworld (Angus McGowan (Andrew Keir))
- Falling Down (Captain Bill Yardley (Raymond J. Barry))
- Ghostbusters (DVD edition) (Archbishop)
- In the Line of Fire (DVD edition) (President of the United States)
- The Karate Kid (DVD edition) (Mister Miyagi (Pat Morita))
- The Karate Kid Part III (DVD edition) (Mister Miyagi (Pat Morita))
- Memories of Murder (Sergeant Shin Dong-chul (Song Jae-ho))
- Rambo: First Blood Part II (TV Asahi edition) (Captain Vinh)
- The Survivor (1983 TV Tokyo edition) (Priest (Joseph Cotten))
- Twin Peaks (Pete Martell (Jack Nance))

==== Animation ====
- House of Mouse (Horace Horsecollar, White Rabbit, Sheriff of Nottingham)
- G.I. Joe: A Real American Hero (Torch)
- The Simpsons Movie (Theater edition) (Mr. Burns)

=== CD ===
- Clock Tower 2 (Rick)
