= Zoobles! (TV series) =

Korean television series

- Volume 1 DVD cover
- Genre: Adventure; Comedy; Fantasy; Slice of life
- Developed by: Sega Toys; Spin Master
- Written by: Tetsuo Yasumi
- Directed by: Nam Jong-Sik
- Theme music composer: Lee In-Young
- Opening theme: "I Love Zoobles!" by Rainbow "Candy Girls!" by Rainbow
- Ending theme: "The Adventures of Zoobles" by Rainbow
- Composer: Lee In-Young
- Countries of origin: South Korea; Japan
- Original languages: Korean; Japanese
- No. of episodes: 26 (52 segments)

Production
- Executive producer: Mitsuko Ohya
- Producers: Lee Suk-Young; Ha Hae-Ran; Yuko Matsumoto (Japan)
- Running time: 23 minutes (two 11-minute segments)
- Production company: Dong Woo Animation

Original release
- Network: Seoul Broadcasting System (South Korea); TV Tokyo, TV Aichi (Japan)
- Release: May 18 – November 23, 2011

Zoobles! (Korean: 쥬블스, Katakana: ズーブルズ!, Zūburuzu!) is an animated TV series, based on the toy line of the same name by Spin Master and Sega Toys. Produced by Dong Woo Animation in South Korea, the series is written by Tetsuo Yasumi, best known as the head writer of the animated adaptation of Happy Happy Clover, with Duel Masters producer Mitsuko Ohya in charge of production. The series' characters were designed by Nam Jong-Sik of Animal Yokochō and Kazuya Hayashi of Happy Happy Clover.

The series began airing on SBS in South Korea between May 18 and November 23, 2011. An official Japanese dubbed version aired in Japan on TV Tokyo from February 5 to March 25, 2012, replacing Bakugan Battle Brawlers: Gundalian Invaders in its initial time slot. The series re–aired on April 5, after moving to a newer time slot and ended its broadcast on September 27 the same year.

== Plot ==
The Candy Factory is the place where all Zoobles are born. Beyond the factory is a world called Candy Land where all Zoobles live. The story revolves around three main Zoobles: Chevy, a cat Zooble with an orange flavor, Coron, a rabbit Zooble with a strawberry milk flavor and Panky, a panda Zooble with a blueberry yogurt flavor. The trio live in Candy Land, living and playing together with their friends and getting in misadventures as they learn to solve each problem they face.

== Production ==
=== Development ===
Development of the series began after the toys were released in Japan and Korea. The series itself is based on the Sega Toys adaptation of the toyline in both Japan and Korea, which differs greatly from the western version by Spin Master. Sega Toys approached Korea's Dong Woo Animation to help them make an animated series based on the toys. In turn, Dong Woo Animation and Sega assembled a group of animation staff and crew for said project. The people involved include Tetsuo Yasumi, the head writer of the animated adaptation of Happy Happy Clover and Mitsuko Ohya, director of Duel Masters as producer, while the character designs were done by Nam Jong-Sik of Animal Yokochō and Kazuya Hayashi of Happy Happy Clover. Korean pop group Rainbow also contributed to the series' production as they sang both the opening and ending themes.

=== Japanese dub ===
According to Mai Hirano, the airing dates of the episodes do not follow the standard episodic order during the dubbing of the series, unlike the Korean version.

=== Music ===
Opening theme

- I Love Zoobles!
  - Lyrics: Lee In-Young
  - Composition: Lee In-Young
  - Arrangement: Lee In-Young
  - Artist: Rainbow (DSP Media/Universal Sigma)
  - Episodes: 1–8
- Candy Girls!
  - Lyrics: Mai Watarai
  - Rapping: Emyli
  - Composition: Han Sang-Won, Yoon Young-Mi
  - Arrangement: Han Sang-Won, Yoon Young-Mi
  - Artist: Rainbow (Universal Sigma)
  - Episodes: 9-26

Ending theme

- Adventures of Zoobles (Zooblesの冒険, Zūburuzu! No bōken)
  - Lyrics: Lee In-Young and Yoo Seung-Hye
  - Composition: Lee In-Young and Yoo Seung-Hye
  - Arrangement: Lee In-Young and Yoo Seung-Hye
  - Artist: Rainbow (DSP Media/Universal Sigma)

== Episodes ==
KR episode	JP episode	Title	Original release date	Japanese airdate
1	16	"Dancing Zoobles!/ Go for it, Panky!" "Danshingu Zūburuzu! / Ganbare! Pankī"(ダンシング・ズーブルズ! / 頑張れ！パンキー)	May 18, 2011	May 24, 2012
"Dancing Zoobles!": Chevy and Coron go to Panky's tree house and wake him up as they have plans to go to the Rainbow Park together, but after the three arrive at the park, Chevy and Panky go to drink the water from the fountain until they notice some Zoobles hiding behind the tree, somehow scared. They then encounter three mysterious Zoobles called the Black Candies, which is composed of Blacky, a vanilla and caramel-flavored dog Zooble, Mikey, a chocolate and mint-flavored dog Zooble, and Cooper, a chocolate and banana-flavored giraffe Zooble. The trio claim the fountain as their own and the only way to reclaim it is for Chevy and her friends to win a dance competition against them. There is one problem, though: Coron and Panky don't know how to dance well. "Go for it, Panky!": Panky himself has a bit of a problem crossing a pole. Because of this, Chevy and Coron consult to Peel, a cherry-flavored bird Zooble to train him to be more assertive. Note: This episode was first released on DVD in Japan, packaged within the limited edition of the Zoobles toys. The episode was also re-aired again in high definition in Korea on November 23, 2011.
2	1 19	"Careless Pom / Mel, Rin, and the Rainbow Sea" "Ukkari pomu-kun / Niji no umi no Meru to Rin"(うっかりポムくん / 虹の海のメルとリン)	May 25, 2011	February 5, 2012 June 14, 2012 (Japanese Reairing)
"Careless Pom": Pom, a lemon-flavored mouse Zooble receives a letter from Panky about something, while, on the other hand, Coron and Panky receive a letter from him, explaining Panky's close relation. Meanwhile Chevy catches a cold and is stuck at home all day as Pom greets her, but is told not to go near her due to her cold. He, however, actually mistells the whole thing to Randy, a pudding-flavored koala Zooble, which makes her very angry at her and also to Pom. To correct everything on Pom's mistakes, Chevy, Coron and Panky ask Kumanpa for advice. "Mel, Rin, and the Rainbow Sea": Chevy and her friends receive a letter from Mel, a pink grapefruit-flavored seahorse Zooble, to come and play with her. The trio agree, and later meet up with Mel and her fish friend, Gonzales. As they dive underwater, they later meet Rin, a Blue Hawaii-flavored fish Zooble who tells them about the Rainbow Pot being stolen by someone. As they find out who the culprit is, Chevy and the others decide to get the pot back. Note: The episode was re-aired again in high definition in Korea on November 30, 2011.
3	9	"The Flower of Love Blooms / Fortune Telling Zoobles" "Koi no hana saku koto mo aru / Uranai zūburuzu"(恋の花咲くこともある / 占いズーブルズ)	June 1, 2011	April 5, 2012
"The Flower of Love Blooms": Chevy and the others go to the beach to relax, until they meet the comical duo Chip and Tap, as they all play on the beach. Chip soon falls in love with Mikey, who is also at the beach, and the others need to do something to win his heart. The only way to solve the problem is to ask Kumanpa for advice. "Fortune Telling Zoobles": As Chevy and Panky go to Coron's house, the two learn that she is reading her own fortune from a book. They all then consult Reel and ask him if he can read their fortunes, but one of the predictions to Coron causes her a lot of bad luck throughout the day, as he predicted that something that shines is going to cause drastic changes to her future. As this prediction affects her, the predictions for Chevy and Panky are affect them as well. Note: Starting with this episode, the Japanese time slot was moved to Thursday at 7:30 AM. The episode was re-aired again in high definition in Korea on December 7, 2011.
4	20	"The Melancholy of Randy / Here Comes Su-Su!" "Randī no yūutsu / Sūsū ga yattekita!"(ランディーの憂鬱 / スースーがやってきた!)	June 8, 2011	June 21, 2012
"The Melancholy of Randy": Randy walks alone one day, having problems with something, causing Chevy and her friends to notice her. Panky accidentally knocks her into a mud puddle as Chevy decides to help her get out of the puddle. She explains that she has a crush on Em, and somehow can't admit her true feelings to him. Worse, Em is with another female Zooble, who happens to be stalking him. The trio consult Kumanpa to find a way to bring the two lovebirds together, though his advice doesn't make sense. After they go to see Randy, who is wearing a strange melon-shaped mask, however, hilarity ensues as Em ends up with Silvy and she ends up heartbroken again. "Here Comes Su-Su!": Chevy and her friends are practising Yoga at the Rainbow Park until Coron notices her milk bottle is upside down and empty. She blames the two for it, but notices it wasn't their fault. They then realize it was the work of Su-Su, a pineapple and orange-flavored monkey Zooble, who has come to Candy Land and is playing pranks on others using his magic, and as a result, the residents are in chaos thanks to his pranks. Chevy and her friends need to stop him before the whole of Candy Land turns topsy-turvy.
5	10	"Mirror, Mirror! / An Uproar in the Kitchen Land" "Kagami yo kagami! / Kitchin rando wa ōsawagi"(鏡よ鏡! / キッチンランドは大騒ぎ)	June 15, 2011	April 12, 2012
"Mirror, Mirror!": Maron, a grape-flavored rabbit Zooble, looks at herself in the mirror, admiring her reflection, until she sees how overweight she is on the scales. She decides to go to the Rainbow Fountain to drink some slimming water to reduce her weight. At the same time, Chevy and Coron arrive at the park, and they see her, confusing Chevy, and thinking Coron is cuter than Maron. The next day, Maron becomes jealous, and yet, admires Coron while hiding in the bushes. After she fakes fainting from the fruit she ate, however, the trio become suspicious until Blacky shows up. "An Uproar in the Kitchen Land": Chevy, Panky, and Coron go to the flower fields for a picnic. On their arrival, Coron and Panky notice how bad Chevy's cooking is and decide to go to Ron's Restaurant for something to eat. The trio learn that her restaurant didn't get many customers, and they decide to invite the others. When Ron has a problem with the fire used in cooking, they consult Kumanpa for advice on getting the only source of fire. Note: The episode was re-aired again in high definition in Korea on December 14, 2011.
6	2 21	"Spicy Zoobles / The Curse of the Stone" "Gekikara Zūburuzu / Noroi no ishi"(激辛ズーブルズ / 呪いの石)	June 22, 2011	February 12, 2012; June 28, 2012 (Japanese reairing)
"Spicy Zoobles": Chevy and her friends go to the northern region of Candy Land to attend the annual skating competition. There they meet SunSan, a habanero-flavored starfish Zooble and a figure skater champion with a rather egotistical attitude. Later on, Chevy and her friends spy on her to study her skills at Kumanpa's suggestion. On the day of the competition itself, Chevy tries her best to win, until she notices something wrong with SunSan during the competition itself. "The Curse of the Stone": Chevy and her friends roll around in Candy Land, until they accidentally discover a small shrine in the forest. Reel, a soda-flavored bird Zooble, warns them about the shrine, saying that whoever disturbs it will be petrified. Chevy and her friends are cursed due to it, as they will be turned into stone until they tell ten of their friends to prevent it, but also cause a lot of chaos and confusion all over Candy Land. Em, however, knows that it is just a rumor, and Chevy later finds out the stone in the shrine is actually Kumanpa's power stone. Note: The episode was re-aired again in high definition in Korea on December 21, 2011.
7	15	"Break Up, No More! / The False Kumanpa Appears!" "Zekkō, kekkō! / Nisemono kumanpa genru!"(絶交、けっこう！ / にせものクマンパ現る！)	June 29, 2011	May 17, 2012
"Break Up, No More!": An argument between Chevy, Coron, and Panky over ice cream causes them to end their friendship for good. As for them to not admit they're sorry, Panky consults Kumanpa on how they can rebuild their shattered friendship. "The False Kumanpa Appears!": A rumor in the land states that Kumanpa is around, but it turns out to be an impostor named ToTo, a cappuccino-flavored lion Zooble who wants to meet Kumanpa in person. It even gets confusing to the trio that ToTo will do anything to meet him. Note: The episode was re-aired again in high definition in Korea on December 28, 2011.
8	3 25	"Circles, Squares, and Triangles! / The Circle of Beauty" "Marukute, shikakukute, sankaku yo! / Kiyoku utsukushiku manmaru ku"(丸くて、四角くて、三角よ！ / 清く美しくまん丸く)	July 6, 2011	February 19, 2012; July 26, 2012 (Japanese reairing)
"Circles, Squares, and Triangles!": Chevy and her friends go to the western area of Candy Land to meet Harry, a dragonfruit-flavored hedgehog Zooble. After playing together, Chevy and Panky drink from the forbidden fountain, causing their heads changed shape. A lot of trouble occurs to the group during their journey to find a cure, especially encountering a lot of Rock Mice along their way. "The Circle of Beauty": Chevy and her friends go to the Rainbow Fountain only find out no one else iss around. They then encounter Panna, a peach yoghurt-flavored panda Zooble. Chevy is shocked to see her because of her wish to change Chevy's tomboyish image, with plans to make her more feminine like the other female Zoobles. This becomes a wild-goose chase as Chevy is runs away from her to every area in Candy Land. Note: The episode was re-aired again in high definition in Korea on January 4, 2012.
9	22	"Operation Matchmaking! / PiPi's Tail Accessories" "Gōkon dai sakusen! / Pipi no shippo-kazari"(合コン大作戦! / ピピのしっぽ飾り)	July 13, 2011	July 5, 2012
"Operation Matchmaking!": Chevy and her friends plan to play in the flower park, until they encounter Frappe, an apricot-flavored elephant Zooble who is having a difficult time. The trio convince her to join them on their dance session, but she refuses. The trio then consult Kumanpa about Frappe's problem and find out she is having problems with romance. As they talk to Frappe about her love problem, they say they will find a suitable male Zooble for her. As the trio convince Em about Frappe, Randy becomes jealous. Pom then tags along, making things worse for the trio, and especially for Randy. "PiPi's Tail Accessories": Chevy encounters the Black Candies and is told about the handmade tail accessories that are very popular. Even worse, Coron and Panky have tail decorations on their tails as well, until PiPi, a peach and cheese flavored mouse Zooble, arrives and admires their new accessories. Seeing that Chevy doesn't have one, she gives Chevy an accessory as well, except that she finds it unattractive and decides to steal PiPi's instead. Adding insult to injury, she loses her tail accessory on her way to the Black Candies, making PiPi upset. In the end, they all consult Kumanpa for the missing accessory. Note: The episode was re-aired again in high definition in Korea on January 11, 2012.
10	11	"The Wandering Zooble / Chevy the Great Detective" "Sasurai no zūburuzu / Mei tantei chebī"(さすらいのズーブルズ / 名探偵チェビー)	July 20, 2011	April 19, 2012
"The Wandering Zooble": Panky encounters Happi, a mint and acreola-flavored bat Zooble, who hails from Candy Mountain. He is drifting around Candy Land in search of his Happitat. As Panky shows Happi the whole place, he then takes him to Chevy and Coron and introduces him. Panky is concerned that he doesn't have a place to stay and the next day, the trio decide to build him his own Happitat. Happi, however, becomes tired after a while, and even Kumanpa doesn't have any helpful advice, leaving the trio at odds on what to do, until Chip and Tap help them. "Chevy the Great Detective": The trio go to the Rainbow Fountain, but they find it empty and dry. Chevy decides to solve the case by becoming a detective, until the Black Candies show up, and end up being interrogated. Blacky and his lackeys are then proven innocent on the case, leading the trio to search for clues. Blacky blames Chevy on the fountain until Coron finds a clue: a lollipop. Panna arrives at the scene, noticing that the helmet from the statue is missing. As they arrive there, they all see a lollipop and a strange mark on the ground, thinking it is Chevy's doing. As the mystery unravels deeper, they consult Kumanpa for advice on the disappearance and clear Chevy's name on all the wrongdoings. Note: The episode was re-aired again in high definition in Korea on January 18, 2012.
11	5 23	"Shooting Stars and Zoobles / Silvy the Model" "Nagareboshi to zūburuzu / Moderu no shirubī"(流れ星とズーブルズ / モデルのシルビー)	August 3, 2011	March 4, 2012; July 12, 2012 (Japanese reairing)
"Shooting Stars and Zoobles": Panky notices a strange shooting star that is falling from the sky, which knocks him out. Em comes to tell him about the shooting star, and Chevy and Panky later arrive to tell him about it, and decide they should go to the shooting star summit to ride with the stars, until they encounter the Black Candies once again. Blacky challenges them to a race as to see who is the fastest star rider, in which Chevy agrees. "Silvy the Model": Coron and Panky read magazine articles about Silvy, a melon-flavored tabby cat Zooble, until they accidentally rip a page. Later on, Chevy arrives as they tell her about Silvy, until they notice a huge crowd of Zoobles at Rainbow Park surrounding Silvy, as both Coron and Panky join in. Silvy herself, however, wants to get away from the crowds and her fans due to too much pressure, and it is up to Chevy and Coron to distract everyone so Silvy can take a day off. When Silvy becomes ill the next day, it is up to the trio to do something to fill up her shoes. Note: The episode was re-aired again in high definition in Korea on January 25, 2012.
12	14	"Inspirational Poet Lily / What Day is it Today?" "Shijin no rirī wa kangeki-ya-san / Kyō wa nan no hi!"(詩人のリリーは感激屋さん / 今日はなんの日！)	August 10, 2011	May 10, 2012
"Inspirational Poet Lily": Chevy and her friends encounter Lily, a pomegranate-flavored rabbit Zooble, and decide to hide until their cover is blown. The trio find her eccentric as she always speaks in rhyme and always writes poems, annoying the others in the process. Lily tries to join in with the trio and play with them, as they accept, but every time they play, Lily always says a strange poem, and one time, causes the trio to feel uncomfortable while she is around. When Lily is in trouble, Chevy and the others decide to save her, even if they find her annoying. "What Day is it Today?": Maron admires herself in the mirror, as she remembers a party in Coron's place due to her birthday. Later on, everyone enjoys the cake Coron made, which makes Maron jealous. After the party, Coron receives a letter from Maron about her birthday party and consults Chevy and Panky about it. Coron becomes jealous as well as Maron's plan works. The trio talk about it later on, and Coron decides to host a revenge party to make Maron jealous. Maron does the same as well, causing both Zoobles to engage in an all-out party combat against each other. As the competition heats up, the group decides to consult Kumanpa for advice. Note: The episode was re-aired again in high definition in Korea on February 1, 2012.
13	26	"Mill the Mail Carrier / Beware of Love Fortune Telling!" "Yūbin haitatsu no miru / Koi uranai ni goyōshin!"(郵便配達のミル / 恋占いにご用心!)	August 17, 2011	August 2, 2012
"Mill the Mail Carrier": Mill, a cranberry-flavored bird Zooble, is devoted to her job as mail carrier of Candy Land. She is offered a glass of milk by Coron to where she is tempted and drinks it. Afterwards, she panics over being late for an important delivery and accidentally runs into Chevy and Panky, resulting in her foot being injured and in a cast for a while. The trio will have to deliver the mail for Mill as her foot takes time to heal. "Beware of Love Fortune Telling!": Coron is up to her romantic fantasies again, much to the dismay of Chevy and Panky. They set off for Rainbow Park, where they encounter Reel again. Reel explains to them that love is the strongest that day, which excites Coron. Note: The episode was re-aired again in high definition in Korea on February 8, 2012.
14	28	"Panky, Have You Gone Bad?/ Ginseng Flavored Chim" "Pankī, waru ni naru? / Kōreininjin aji no chimu"(パンキー、ワルになる? / 高麗人参味のチム)	August 24, 2011	August 16, 2012
"Panky, Have You Gone Bad?": As the trio explore the forest, Chevy frightens Panky by telling him that there could be something lurking in the woods. Panky flees just as the two find him hiding in a bush, and they talk about how he could be braver. Panky, however, flees again as he thinks he won't ever toughen up. As Panky encounters the Black Candies, he then asks them if they can accept him in their group so that he can become tougher, which surprises them. The group teaches him what they know, even making him as tough as they are. Though this attempt separates him from his real friends, Chevy and Coron try to make him leave the group and reunite with them. "Ginseng Flavored Chim": The trio pick flowers one day in the forests of Candy Land. Chevy encounters an elephant Zooble, and the group asks him, but he responds harshly due to Chevy stepping onto the grass. Later on, Chevy starts to feel unwell as Pom arrives. He explains to them about her condition and the cure, which can only be done by Chim, a ginseng-flavored Zooble. Coron and Panky encounter Chim and explain to him Chevy's condition, but it doesn't go well while talking. Coron and Panky are almost out of options, and Chevy is almost close to succumbing to the illness. They must figure out how get out of this situation. Note: The episode was re-aired again in high definition in Korea on February 15, 2012.
15	24	"Lou's Balloon / Chevy and the Sunset Flowers" "Rū to fūsen / Chebī to yūhi no hana"(ルーと風船 / チェビーと夕陽の花)	August 31, 2011	July 19, 2012
"Lou's Balloon": Lou, an azuki bean-flavored bear Zooble is celebrating her birthday. As Em decorates their home for the party, Chevy and her friends arrive just in time, but Lou is full of mischief and sometimes causes trouble to the four Zoobles taking care of her. Later on, they start the party and give Lou balloons, but after Coron presents her cake, a strawberry milk cake, the Black Candies also arrive and present their cake: a chocolate mint cake, while giving her some balloons too. While they argue about which cake is better, Em notices the young Zooble is missing from her crib and everyone sees her in the sky holding the balloons. Now they need to catch her before further trouble occurs. "Chevy and the Sunset Flowers": Chevy and Coron visit their friend Panky to find out about the rare phenomenon of the Sunset Flowers. It is said that the flowers bloom in the sunset once every year, making it a rare phenomenon that cannot be missed. The trio decide to search for it, but they have no luck at all on the flower's whereabouts. After a while, they decide to ask Kumanpa for advice. His hint helps them a bit on their search and ends up finding the flowers beneath the giant flower fields, not knowing that someone is stalking them due to the news about the flower's rare blooming. Note: Alongside episode 16, this is one of the two episodes that were shown first on TV Tokyo's NoriNori♪Nori Suta programming block and the toys' official Japanese website promoting the toyline in Japan. Also, this episode was again re-aired in Korea on February 22, 2012.
16	31	"The Black Candies' Revenge / Art Goes Round and Round" "Burakkukyandīzu no gyakushū / Geijutsu wa manmaruda!"(ブラックキャンディーズの逆襲 / 芸術はまん丸だ!)	September 7, 2011	September 6, 2012
"The Black Candies' Revenge": Being fed up with Chevy all the time, Blacky decides to embarrass her after what she said to him, as both Mikey and Cooper decide to help him. His first plan is to make Chevy panic by leaving banana skins in the park, but his first plan backfires as he is embarrassed in front of everyone. Later on, he comes up with another plan to make her believe that they were attacked by a monster, but Chevy knows that something fishy is going on with the gang. "Art Goes Round and Round": Coron and Panky meet up with Pupu, a Blue Hawaii-flavored elephant Zooble, who is somewhat depressed over something. The two approach him and learn that he is looking for a model who is always active all the time, until Chevy arrives, making him happy that he found the right model for his pictures. When Chevy denies the offer, he goes into a emotional streak, making her accept his offer for his sake. After a few mishaps and the involvement of the Black Candies, Pupu seems to get much more pressure on his hands. Note: Alongside episode 15, this is one of the two episodes that were shown first on TV Tokyo's NoriNori♪Nori Suta block and the toys' official Japanese website promoting the toyline in Japan. Also, the episode was again re-aired in Korea on February 29, 2012.
17	13	"The Disappearance of the Candy Bag / Crew and Kumanpa" "Kieta kyandībaggu / Kurū to kumanpa"(消えたキャンディーバッグ / クルーとクマンパ)	September 14, 2011	May 3, 2012
"The Disappearance of the Candy Bag": The trio are in the treehouse, where they play with their friends. Airo notices someone is admiring Coron, and notices that Coron forgot her Candy Bag. She ten decides to dress up like Coron and carry the same candy bag, even pretending to be like her. Later, at the Rainbow Fountain, Airo sees the Black Candies and makes them happy by giving them some milk. Chevy's group then arrives and question the Black Candies about the bag, but without any leads, they decide to ask Kumanpa. As the trio learn something from his advice, they come up with a perfect plan to catch Airo and get Coron's bag back. "Crew and Kumanpa": The trio visit Coron's house to try Coron's special strawberry milk, as both Chevy and Panky begin to fight. Crew then arrives, tries to stop the fight and tells Chevy to pour the glasses again before he leaves. Later, the trio have lunch as the Black Candies arrive and wish join them, but there is not enough food. Crew comes up with another solution and leaves, but with the group relying on Crew on their problems is starting to upset Kumanpa, and ends up creating a downpour throughout the land. The trio, along with Crew, are now going to have to find a way to cheer up Kumanpa. Note: The episode was re-aired again in high definition in Korea on March 7, 2012.
18	18	"The Hero Returns / Arl's Tea Party" "Kaettekita hīrō / āru no tīpātī"(帰ってきたヒーロー / アールのティーパーティー)	September 21, 2011	June 6, 2012
"The Hero Returns": The trio visit the Candy Town Cinema to meet Tam, a butter-flavored cat Zooble, who recently came back from a trip to another town. Tam shows to the trio his skills and admits that he fought a lot of enemies in the city he once visited. When a real monster comes, they realise he is not as much of a hero as they initially thought, but Tam tries to find the strength to deal with this challenge. "Arl's Tea Party": Chevy is invited to a tea party hosted by Arl, a green tea-flavored bear Zooble. Chevy is not keen on tea parties, but her friends convince her otherwise. This, however, goes from better to worse for Chevy after an unlucky chain of events. Note: The episode was re-aired again in high definition in Korea on March 14, 2012.
19	6 29	"The Mysterious Thief Zooble / Welcome to Kumanpa's Happitat!" "Kaitō zūburuzu / Yōkoso, kumanpa no hapitatto e!"(怪盗ズーブルズ / ようこそ、クマンパのハピタットへ！)	September 28, 2011	March 11, 2012; August 21, 2012
"The Mysterious Thief Zooble": Chevy and Panky read their favorite comics until a flash of thunder slightly scares them. They then see a thief named Mato, a tomato-flavored bird Zooble, who is notorious for stealing junk with her lollipop as she flees. Coron also notices the incident, and the trio become confused. As the day passes, everyone in Candy Land rely on her to dispose of junk, until she becomes angry and decides to kidnap Panky. "Welcome to Kumanpa's Happitat!": Kumanpa invites Chevy and her friends to go to his Happitat to throw a karaoke party, but the only problem is how to get there, since his only home is located above the sky. They soon consult their pilot friend and inventor Winny, an apple and cinnamon-flavored moose Zooble, but getting there is probably the least of their worries. Note: The episode was re-aired again in high definition in Korea on March 21, 2012.
20	4 30	"Ninja Alia Appears! / Chevy's Birthday" "Ninja aria de gozaru! / Chebī no bāsudē"(忍者アリアでござる！ / チェビーのバースデー)	October 5, 2011	February 26, 2012; August 28, 2012
"Ninja Alia Appears!": Chevy and her friends go to the flower fields to have a picnic until they have a strange encounter with Alia, an apple-flavored cat Zooble who studies martial arts. She steals the trio's picnic food and they must outsmart her to get their food back, but soon, Alia gets stuck in a tree and they must find a way to get her down. "Chevy's Birthday": Chevy is excited for her upcoming birthday party as she goes to Coron's house to see the cake she baked for the occasion, but, bizzarely, her friends are constantly ignoring her. Later on, at the beach, she meets Ninya, a watermelon-flavored octopus Zooble who was invited to meet Coco, a cola-flavored Fish Zooble. The three of them play together in the Rainbow Sea, unbeknownst to them that Chevy is feeling lonely without her real friends during her birthday. Note: The episode was re-aired again in high definition in Korea on March 28, 2012.
21	32	"Welcome to the Horror House! / The Young Wizard Apprentice Girl" "Yōkoso horāhausu e! / Anokoha minarai mahōtsukai"(ようこそホラーハウスへ! / あの子は見習い魔法使い)	October 12, 2011	September 13, 2012
"Welcome to the Horror House!": Chevy, Coron, and Panky read a book about a mysterious haunted house located somewhere in Candy Land, and they decide to go said place. Coron wants the diamonds that are in the abandoned house, but unbeknownst to them, the house is about to give them the scare of their lives. Even worse, the Black Candies also want the diamonds that Coron is searching for. Later on, they finally discover the secrets inside the mansion with a little help. "The Young Wizard Apprentice Girl": The trio play knights and magicians until they encounter Saku, a sakura-flavored cat Zooble, who is an apprentice magician. Saku takes a test to get into the Magic Academy, but she has problems using her magic as the trio decides to help her. As they all successfully teach her to ride a broomstick, Saku decides to practice some magic with the trio, though this backfires, and worse, it accidentally turns the trio into frogs and turning them back is much more difficult than it looks. Note: The episode was re-aired again in high definition in Korea on April 4, 2012.
22	17	"Duo Break-Up: Chip and Tap / Riding on a Bubble" "Konbi kaisan! ? Chipputappu / Shabontama ni notte" (コンビ解散！？チップタップ / しゃぼん玉に乗って)	October 19, 2011	March 31, 2012
"Duo Break-Up: Chip and Tap": Chevy, Coron, and Panky go to the beach to have fun. Soon, the trio notice Chip and Tap arguing with each other for no apparent reason. As they consult the two, the comedy duo are at each other's throats, due to one of their routines having gone wrong and decide to break up. Worst of all, the duo wants either a new member to be either part of their group, which are Coco and Ninya. The trio consult Lily, Ron, and Arl, but it doesn't help them. Chevy and her friends must do everything to get the two back together. "Riding on a Bubble": Chevy and her friends travel to Winny's Happitat to look at his new invention: a machine that can blow giant bubbles that don't pop when touched. Chevy and her friends are amazed by the new invention, despite having some flaws. That night, the machine is stolen and the whole place is a mess. Winny is in a panic as they all track down the thief all over Candy Land until they find out, as it causes trouble for everyone. Note: The episode was re-aired again in high definition in Korea on April 18, 2012.
23	33	"A Flea Market for Everyone / Let's Shout, Screaming Contest" "Min'na de furīmāketto / Sakebou, ōgoe taikai"(みんなでフリーマーケット / 叫ぼう、大声大会)	October 26, 2011	September 20, 2012
"A Flea Market for Everyone": Panky has a hammock full of old toys and Coron suggests he sell them at a flea market. Many Zoobles come in to turn in their old items, including Tinny, a cassis grape-flavored rabbit Zooble, who gets into a fight with Chevy. Most of the items are random items, such as an hourglass without sand and a bent spoon, until a lunchbox covered in dust catches the eyes of the trio. It turns out it was the old lunchbox of Chevy and Tinny, who used to be childhood friends until their friendship eventually fizzled out. "Let's Shout, Screaming Contest": In the snowy region of Candy Land, there is a screaming contest being held where the winner is crowned Queen of the Snowy Land and the prize being a year's worth of ice cream. Chevy, her friends, and many other Zoobles enter the contest, including Potte, a chocolate and strawberry-flavored reindeer Zooble. The trio befriend Potte and train with her so that she will win the contest. Note: This episode was supposed to air as episode 7 in Japan but got skipped and episode 24 took its place. The episode also re-aired again in high definition in Korea on April 25, 2012.
24	7 27	"Loff the Timid / Is Coope a Lucky Girl?" "Hazukashigariya no rofu / Kūpe wa rakkīgāru?"(恥ずかしがり屋のロフ / クーペはラッキーガール?)	November 2, 2011	March 17, 2012; August 9, 2012
"Loff the Timid": Chevy and her friends go to the fields and notice a shy Zooble rolling away, who is identified as Loff, a plum-flavored tabby cat Zooble. Curious, they all decide to meet her, but due to her shyness, she always runs away from the trio, even outsmarting the three Zoobles. In a last-ditch effort, Chevy, Coron, and Panky try to make her come out of her ball form by tickling her, but also fail, leaving Chevy to call Kumanpa for advice. "Is Coope a Lucky Girl?": Ron's doughnut shop has just opened and is attracting a lot of customers, especially Chevy and the group. In the midst, they all meet Coope, a raspberry and cheese-flavored giraffe Zooble, who is having serious issues about luck as she gets into all kinds of trouble. After they meet Em, he decides to take a hiking trip with his friends, but everything goes wrong due to Coope's bad luck. Note: This episode was accidentally titled as "A Flea Market for Everyone / Let's Shout, Screaming Contest" on the official Japanese Zoobles website until the real title was revealed in the initial broadcast. The episode was also re-aired again in high definition in Korea on May 2, 2012.
25	12	"Amy the Lovestruck Whale / Toffy and Tosh" "Koisuru kujira no eimī / Tofī to tosshu"(恋するクジラのエイミー / トフィーとトッシュ)	November 9, 2011	April 26, 2012
"Amy the Lovestruck Whale": Chevy receives a letter on her Happitat as Mell and Rin invite her and friends to play by the sea. Chevy and her friends meet Amy, a sour blueberry-flavored whale Zooble, whom they find out has a crush on a blue whale named Sean. They wonder whether it is a love at first sight or it could be a serious heartbreak between them. "Toffy and Tosh": Toffy, a coconut and berry-flavored bear Zooble comes to Candy Land to play a role in an upcoming play, but after he meets Tosh, a lemon and lime-flavored mouse Zooble, he develops a crush on her as he explains to the trio. As Chevy and her friends notice this, they decide to play matchmaker to get the two together, even if Toffy has to pretend to be a prince. Note: The episode was re-aired again in high definition in Korea on May 9, 2012.
26	8 34	"The Zoobles' Car Race / Welcome to the Candy Factory!" "Zūburuzu kārēsu / Yōkoso, kyandīfakutorī e!"(ズーブルズ・カーレース / ようこそ、キャンディーファクトリーへ！)	November 16, 2011	March 25, 2012; September 27, 2012 (Japanese Reairing)
"The Zoobles' Car Race": Chevy and her friends go to the Rainbow Fountain to drink, until they see the Black Candies driving a new car. They challenge the three to a race throughout Candy Land for a second time, which she agrees. As they consult Winny about the race and provide them with a car, it is set to be an all-out race throughout Candy Land. As the race heats up, the Black Candies cheat. "Welcome to the Candy Factory!": One day, Chevy and Coron meet up with Panky as they go to practice for a soccer tournament in Candy Land, but due to them being short of one member they ask Q'n, a papaya-flavored monkey Zooble, if she can help. After a while, they encounter Panna once more as she gives them a hand, until they encounter the Black Candies, who tease the trio and especially Panky. Panky decides to practice hard by himself, but later on, Chevy notices Panky is getting clumsier every time and is getting left behind. As he loses his way, he accidentally trips and falls off a cliff. Chevy, Coron, and Panna find him both injured and unconscious at the bottom of the cliff. They summon Kumanpa in a haste so that he will bring Panky to the Candy Factory and get him back to health. Note: The episode was re-aired again in high definition in Korea on May 16, 2012.

== Home video ==
An official DVD release by Universal Japan of the first volume was released on September 5, 2012, containing the first 12 episodes (24 mini-episodes each) and the music video of "Candy Girls!" performed by Rainbow. A second volume was released on November 14 the same year.
