= Asuka Tanii =

Japanese voice actress

- 谷井 あすか
- Born: June 19, 1978 (age 48); Toyama, Japan
- Occupation: Voice actress

Asuka Tanii (谷井 あすか, Tanii Asuka) (born June 19, 1978), is a Japanese voice actress.

== Voice roles ==
=== Anime ===
2000

- Shiawase Sou no Okojo-san (Hyaho, Miyu, Ruka, Ruru)
- Yobarete Tobidete Akubi-chan (Akubi-chan)

2002

- Shrine of the Morning Mist (Girl B)
- Tokyo Mew Mew (Hanacha)
- Panyo Panyo Di Gi Charat (Elizabeth)
- Fortune Dogs (Howhitey, Puppy)
- UFO Ultramaiden Valkyrie (Remi)

2003

- Wolf's Rain (Researcher B)
- on-chan Yume Power Daibōken (Haruka)
- The Galaxy Railways (Kate)
- Green Green (Female Student)
- Princess Tutu (Tsuchibutannu)
- UFO Ultramaiden Valkyrie 2: December Nocturne (Midori)

2004

- Elfen Lied (Secretary)
- Sgt. Frog (Girl, Kitten, Poyan, Yayoi)
- Fafner (Female Student)
- Futakoi (Man B)
- Black Jack (Announcement, Baby, Chaco, Girl, Hiroko, Luna Luna, Passenger, Yuuichi)
- Magical Girl Lyrical Nanoha (Farin)
- Yakitate!! Japan (Hiromi Kawachi)

2005

- Shuffle! (Part-time Jobber)
- Futari wa Pretty Cure Max Heart (Lulun)
- Magical Girl Lyrical Nanoha A's (Farin, Lieze Aria)
- Loveless (Female Student)

2006

- Welcome to the NHK (Miki Saida)
- Ginga Tetsudo Monogatari: Eien e no Bunkiten (Kate)
- Kekkaishi (Young Girl)
- Hell Girl (Yumi)
- Strain: Strategic Armored Infantry (Carmicheal)
- Nishi no Yoki Majo (Woman B)
- Yomigaeru Sora (Chiemi Nakakura, Sakura Okada)
- Wan Wan Serebu Soreyuke! Tetsunoshin (Hiroko, Yuki Yagino)

2007

- Dinosaur King (Gabu, Loa, Mihasa)
- Sayonara, Zetsubou-Sensei (Kiri Komori, Mayo Mitama)
- Shonen Onmyouji (Nagako)

2008

- Zoku Sayonara Zetsubō Sensei (Kiri Komori)

2009

- Zan Sayonara Zetsubō Sensei (Kiri Komori)
- Stitch! ~Itazura Alien no Daibōken~ (Mr. Stenchy)

2010

- Dance in the Vampire Bund (Nero)

2011

- Is This a Zombie? (Kumacchi)

=== Other ===
- Atelier Rorona: The Alchemist of Arland (video game) (Pamela Ibis)
- Crash Boom Bang! (video game) (Pura)
- Everybody's Tennis (video game) (Eleanor)
- Galaxy Angel (video game) (Noah)
- Galaxy Angel II: Zettai Ryouiki no Tobira (video game) (Noah)
- Galaxy Angel II: Mugen Kairou no Kagi (video game) (Noah)
- Mana Khemia: Alchemists of Al-Revis (video game) (Pamela Ibis)
- Trinity Universe (Pamela Ibis)
- Wild Arms: The Vth Vanguard (video game) (Carol Anderson)
- Night Shift Nurses (Ai Kodama)
