= Crash Boom Bang! =

2006 video game

- North American box art depicts, in clockwise order, Crash, Coco, Crunch, and Cortex
- Developer: Dimps
- Publisher: Vivendi Universal Games (Note: Released under the Sierra Entertainment brand name in all regions except Japan)
- Director: Takeshi Narita
- Producer: Shinji Yoshikawa
- Designers: Yuka Niijima; Maiko Azaki; Shiina Suzuki
- Programmer: Kazuteru Suzuki
- Artist: Yutaka Shioya
- Composer: Kuniyuki Morohashi
- Series: Crash Bandicoot
- Platform: Nintendo DS
- Release: JP: July 20, 2006; NA: October 10, 2006
- Genre: Party
- Modes: Single-player, multiplayer

Crash Boom Bang!, known in Japan as Crash Bandicoot Festival, (Note: Crash Bandicoot Festival (クラッシュ・バンディクー フェスティバル, Kurasshu Bandikū Fesutibaru)) is a 2006 party video game developed by Dimps and published by Vivendi Universal Games for the Nintendo DS. It is the first Crash game to be released for the Nintendo DS, and the second party game of the series, after Crash Bash. The game's story centers on a multi-millionaire who uses the characters of the series to unearth a powerful object dubbed the "Super Big Power Crystal". The game was met with largely negative reviews for having unoriginal, dull gameplay and poor controls.

== Gameplay ==
An example of a minigame in Crash Boom Bang!

Crash Boom Bang!'s stages resemble board games, as each play area is split into a number of squares. The game takes place among four players, with the computer assigned to spare players. All players simultaneously roll dice. The number each player rolls is the number of squares they move forward. Depending on the type of square that the player lands on, Wumpa Fruit (which is used as points during the race) can be won or lost, an item can be obtained, a special event might be triggered, or a mini-game might commence. If a player lands on a fork in the road, the player will have to select the desired direction with either the stylus or the control pad.

In the Adventure Mode, the characters compete in a race for the Super Big Power Crystal. This race is made up of six stages, each containing smaller sub-maps. The host of the race, the Viscount, sets a task for each stage. This task must be completed before the player can continue to another map. The player with the most points is the winner of the stage. The overall winner of all the stages is the winner of the Viscount's race. In the Festival Mode, the gameplay is fundamentally the same as in the Adventure Mode, with the exception of the ability to select stages to play freely. In the My Room mode, the player's character has his or her own private room in which the player can play minigames that have been collected in Adventure Mode, view a collection of items obtained in Adventure Mode, or create a Motion Panel, a unique in-game communication tool can allow customized messages to be sent mid-game to help friends or distract other players' gameplay. The decorations in My Room are different for each character.

Crash Boom Bang! features forty mini-games that can be played alone or remotely against friends. Balance, timing, and intelligence are required to win these mini-games. Players not taking part in a mini-game can bet Wumpa Fruit on the winner. Betting players can assist or obstruct players in the mini-game by using the Motion Panel. If a player has a special item, the player can access the Shop screen from the Bet screen and buy or sell items.

== Plot ==
The Viscount is obsessed with finding the legendary Super Big Power Crystal, a stone said to grant one wish to its owner. He decides to trick the world's cleverest and strongest bunch of characters (which includes the Bandicoots) into helping him. He lures them with a fake global competition called the "World Cannonball Race" promising a huge cash prize of $100 million, intending to use them to collect the items needed to locate the Crystal. The adventure involves several stages: a straightforward race through Port Town; digging up four ancient stone tablets in the desert; collecting torn pieces of the map in the Big City after Doctor Neo Cortex rips it during a struggle with the Viscount; racing to a volcano to catch the Viscount's plane; diving into the freezing deep sea to recover four pieces of the Final Key from the Viscount's grandfather's sunken ship; and climbing the Ancient Tower to reach the Crystal's resting place. Just as the Viscount is about to claim the Super Big Power Crystal, Crash dashes past him and touches it first. Per Crash's wish, hundreds of Wumpa fruit rain from the sky, to the Viscount's devastation. As Crash happily plays in the fruit, Coco cheerfully wishes peace on Earth.

== Development and release ==
Crash Bandicoot's model was altered for the non-Japanese releases

Crash Boom Bang was developed by Dimps under the creative direction of Takeshi Narita, and with Shinji Yoshikawa of Vivendi Universal Games serving as producer. The game was designed by Yuka Niijima, Maiko Azaki and Shiina Suzuki, and was programmed by Kazuteru Suzuki with assistance from Takeshi Kobayashi and Michitoshi Momose. The music was composed and arranged by Kuniyuki Morohashi, while the title theme was composed by Nigorō. Yutaka Shioya served as the game's art director. The voice cast includes Makoto Ishii in the dual role of Crash and Fake Crash, Risa Tsubaki as Coco, Yōsuke Akimoto as Cortex, Asuka Tanii as Pura, Takahiro Yoshino as Pinstripe, Akiko Toda as Tawna, and Shinya Fukumatsu as Crunch.

Crash Boom Bang! was revealed by Vivendi during preparations for E3 2006, where it was publicly announced. It was first released as Crash Bandicoot Festival in Japan on July 20, 2006. This was followed by a North American release on October 10, 2006. Crash Boom Bang! was the seventh best-selling game in Australia on the week of June 4 to June 10, 2007.

A version of the game for mobile phones was developed by Vivendi Games Mobile. Producer Elodie Larre described adapting a party game for the mobile phone as a "big challenge". Not wanting to make "another multiplayer game where the players just pass the phone to each other" and hoping to attract both old and new fans of the series, the development team decided to integrate the mobile phone itself into the minigames, creating such minigame gimmicks as playing with one hand behind the back, with one eye closed, playing with the chin, etc. The biggest challenge for the team was keeping the minigames inside the phone's memory, which was deemed slightly inferior to the first PlayStation console. The WarioWare series was cited as an influence in making the game. The game was ultimately released as Crash Bandicoot MiniGames in March 2007.

== Reception ==
Reception

Aggregate score
Aggregator	Score
Metacritic	37/100

Review scores
Publication	Score
Eurogamer	3/10
GameSpot	4.3/10
GamesRadar+	1/5
IGN	2/10
Nintendo Life	4/10
Nintendo Power	4/10
PALGN	3/10
Pocket Gamer	5/10

Crash Boom Bang! received "generally unfavorable" reviews according to review aggregator Metacritic. Andy Myers of Nintendo Power was surprised by the title's perceived staleness in comparison to Dimps' "stellar" work on Sonic Rush. Lesley Smith of Eurogamer remarked that the game "slipped through the cracks in terms of quality control", and suggested it only as a means to "destroy a child's love of videogames". Craig Harris of IGN said that the game "sends the once A-list mascot into an area usually reserved for generic, nameless furry videogame heroes for bargain budgets", and concluded that it was one of the worst games on the Nintendo DS.

The collection of minigames was deemed to be dull and simplistic, with Anthony Dickens of Nintendo Life surmising that they were aimed toward younger players. Myers and GameSpot's Frank Provo considered only a few of the minigames to be interesting or entertaining, which Provo attributed to their comparatively lessened simplicity. Jon Jordan of Pocket Gamer found the opponents' artificial intelligence to be capricious, which rendered most of the minigames unrewarding. Dickens deemed the game's use of the touch screen to be a gimmick, and Luke Van Leuveren of PALGN proposed that some of the minigames would have been better served with controls via the d-pad or shoulder buttons. Smith and GamesRadar+'s PJ Hruschak complained of poor stylus recognition, with Hruschak noting that the touch screen would periodically cease to function during certain minigames, and Smith declared that "Dimps has tried and failed at using the touch-screen and, to be honest, the game would be better off without it". Smith dismissed the betting mechanic as only briefly entertaining, and Harris lambasted the off-screen competition between computer-controlled opponents as "absolutely ridiculous and unacceptable".

The construction of the board game segments was faulted for contributing to erratic pacing, which led to some games lasting for hours; Harris and Van Leuveren added that the issue was exacerbated by the lack of a save function. The gameplay was said to be unintuitive as a result of inadequate instructions, particularly for the use of items, and Jordan considered the selection of items unimaginative. Dickens admitted to personally disliking imitations of board games in video games, and suggested that the game would have worked better with a stage selection system and a wider variety of minigames in lieu of the board games. Harris pointed out that the board games' central action of rolling the dice was performed by a button press despite the user interface being almost entirely touch screen-driven, and cited this as an example of the game's poor planning.

Dickens commended the visual and audio presentation, but claimed that it lured him into a false sense of security. Provo and Van Leuveren complimented the character animation and detail, but felt that the use of the Crash Bandicoot license was purely cosmetic, as the components outside of the characters lacked any resemblance to those of previous installments. Harris said that while the 3D engine was solid, the character animation was robotic and rough. Smith criticized the quality of the character models and the lack of proper scrolling in the introduction. The audio was dismissed as "generic", "boring", "off-putting", and "happy, bippy, but repetitive".
