= Masayo =

- Gender: Female

Origin
- Origin: Japanese
- Meaning: Different meanings depending on the kanji used

Masayo (written: 雅世 or 雅代, 政代, 正世, 正代 or 匡代) is a feminine Japanese given name. Notable people with the name include:

- Masayo Aoki (青木 政代; born 1935), Japanese swimmer
- Masayo Hosono (細野 雅世; born 1978), Japanese voice actress
- Masayo Imura (井村 雅代; born 1950), Japanese synchronized swimmer and coach
- Masayo Kato (加藤 正世; 1898–1967), Japanese entomologist
- Masayo Kurata (倉田 雅世; born 1969), Japanese voice actress
- Masayo Ōsawa (大沢 政代; 1913–1945), Japanese diver
- Masayo Takahashi (高橋 政代; born 1961), Japanese physician, ophthalmologist and stem cell researcher
- Masayo Tanabu (田名部 匡代; born 1969), Japanese politician

== See also ==
- 5295 Masayo, a main-belt asteroid
