= Edition (publisher) =

Edition (publisher) may refer to various publishing houses:

- Edition am Gutenbergplatz Leipzig (EAGLE), Leipzig, Germany
- Edition Axel Menges
- Edition Breitkopf, Leipzig, Germany
- Edition Durand, France
- Edition Güntersberg
- Edition Harri Deutsch, imprint by Europa-Lehrmittel
- Edition Leipzig, Leipzig, Germany
- Edition PaperONE, Leipzig, Germany
- Edition Peters, Leipzig, Germany
- Edition S, Denmark
- Edition Wandelweiser
- Edition Wilhelm Hansen

== See also ==
- Edition (book)
- Edition (printmaking)
- Edition (disambiguation)
