= Mai Hirano =

Japanese voice actress

- 平野 妹
- Born: October 17, 1985 (age 40); Fukuoka Prefecture, Japan
- Occupation: Voice actress
- Years active: 2008–present
- Agent: Unicorn-Star
- Height: 159 cm (5 ft 3 in)

Mai Hirano (平野 妹, Hirano Mai; born October 17, 1985) is a Japanese voice actress from Fukuoka Prefecture. She is affiliated with the Unicorn-Star talent agency. Previously, she was affiliated with Amuleto, Mediarte, Office Mori and Super Shark entertainment.

== Filmography ==
=== Anime ===
2009

- Gintama as Child A
- The Beast Player Erin as Shiron

2010

- K-On! as Classmate

2011

- Steins;Gate as Boy
- Zoobles! as Chevy

2012

- Shimajirō no Wow! as Kikko Hayashida

=== Original video animation (OVA) ===
- Hiyokoi as Haruko
