= Shinya Fukumatsu =

Japanese voice actor

- ふくまつ進紗
- Born: November 30, 1958 (age 67); Tokyo Prefecture, Japan
- Occupation: Voice actor
- Agent: Mausu Promotion

Shinya Fukumatsu (ふくまつ進紗, Fukumatsu Shin'ya; born November 30, 1958) is a Japanese voice actor from Tokyo Prefecture. He is affiliated with Mausu Promotion.

== Filmography ==
=== Television animation ===
2004

- Yakitate!! Japan (Gardener)

2005

- Aria the Animation (Performer A)
- Gallery Fake (Jury)
- Tide-Line Blue (Sang-jun)
- Black Cat (Durham Glaster)

2006

- Air Gear (Senior Gunz Student)
- Ouran High School Host Club (Sake Store Owner)
- Glass Fleet (Bride's father, Commander)
- Gintama (Yashichi)
- Coyote Ragtime Show (Caster, Richard)
- The Third: The Girl with the Blue Eye (Arms dealer, Council member, Council Member 1)
- Jyu-Oh-Sei (Ochre Second)
- 009-1 (Soldier B)
- Tactical Roar (Committee chairman)
- Tokko (Principal)
- Project Blue Earth SOS (Captain, Invincible Captain)
- Yomigaeru Sora - RESCUE WINGS (125 Pilot, Koyama, Ogata, Tomioka)

2007

- Yes! Precure 5 (Ushi)
- Oh! Edo Rocket (Rokube)
- Mobile Suit Gundam 00 (Captain, Head of State, Massoud Rachmadi, Ragna Harvey, Soldier)
- Kekkaishi (Japanese Teacher)
- Shakugan no Shana Second (Butler)
- Devil May Cry (Akuma)]
- Wangan Midnight (Jun Sonoda)

2008

- Amatsuki (Bantou, Nakamuraya Head Clerk, Yorozu-ya Head Clerk)
- Allison & Lillia (Besser, Captain)
- Yes! Precure 5 GoGo! (Hoshiina)
- Golgo 13 (Doctor)
- Shigofumi: Letters from the Departed (Yakuza)
- Junjou Romantica (Old Man)
- Michiko to Hatchin (Shopkeeper)

2009

- Kiddy Girl-and (Enemy A)
- Gintama (Right Behind You Haha!!)

2010

- Iron Man (Editor Nomura)
- High School of the Dead (Head of Security Section)
- Kuroshitsuji II (Earl Trancy)
- Night Raid 1931 (Kyujiro Hayashi)
- Fullmetal Alchemist: Brotherhood (Fox, Trader A)
- Rainbow - Nisha Rokubō no Shichinin (Campaigner, Setsuko's Father)

2011

- Un-Go (Kichitarou Mitaka)
- Steins;Gate (Butler)
- Naruto Shippuden (Kisuke Maboroshi)
- Blood-C (Cop)
- Pokémon: Black and White (Dr. Tsurara)

2012

- Fate/Zero (Father Simon)

2013

- Star Blazers 2199 (Vance Bahren)
- Gaist Crusher (Gōka Shirogane)
- Galilei Donna (Cassini)
- Naruto: Shippuden (Osoi)

2014

- Sakura Trick (Principal)
- Re:Hamatora (Sawamura)

2016

- Mob Psycho 100 (Kenji Mitsuura)
- My Hero Academia (Sludge Villain)

2018

- Garo: Vanishing Line (Doctor Stanley)

2019

- Blade of the Immortal -Immortal- (Sōsuke Abayama)

2024

- Orb: On the Movements of the Earth (Count Piast)

2026

- The Ghost in the Shell (Dr. Willis)

=== Original net animation ===
- JoJo's Bizarre Adventure: Stone Ocean (2021) (Judge)

=== Theatrical animation ===
- Paprika (2006) (Magician)

=== Video games ===
- Crash Boom Bang! (2006) (Crunch Bandicoot)
- Elsword (????) (Denka)
- Fire Emblem Heroes (2021) (Solon, Veld)
- Izuna: Legend of the Unemployed Ninja (????) (Shūchi)
- Routes (????) (Nagase Genjirō)
- Zack & Wiki: Quest for Barbaros' Treasure (2007) (Goons)
- The Witcher 3: Wild Hunt (2015) (Sigismund Dijkstra)
- Sonic Rush Adventure (2007) (Captain Whisker)
- JoJo's Bizarre Adventure: All Star Battle (2013) (Pesci)
- JoJo's Bizarre Adventure: Eyes of Heaven (2015) (Pesci)
- Sdorica - Mirage (2019) (Devious Lewis Marco)

=== Tokusatsu ===
- Samurai Sentai Shinkenger (2009) (Ayakashi Urawadachi (ep. 22))
- Shuriken Sentai Ninninger (2015) (Youkai Baku (ep. 21))

=== Drama CD ===
- Loveless (????) (Shop manager)

=== Dubbing roles ===
==== Live-action ====
- Bill & Ted Face the Music (Captain Jonathan Logan (Hal Landon Jr.))
- Captain America: The First Avenger (Jacques Dernier (Bruno Ricci))
- Captain Phillips (John Cronan (Chris Mulkey))
- Casablanca (2013 Star Channel edition) (Signor Ugarte (Peter Lorre))
- A Dark Truth (Francisco Francis (Forest Whitaker))
- The Day Shall Come (Andy Mudd (Denis O'Hare))
- The Descendants (Hugh (Beau Bridges))
- Dolittle (Arnall Stubbins (Ralph Ineson))
- Endless Love (Harry Elliot (Robert Patrick))
- ER (Yates (T'Shaun Barrett))
- Extant (Alan Sparks (Michael O'Neill))
- Fair Game (Bill (Noah Emmerich))
- Gentleman Jack (Jeremiah Rawson (Shaun Dooley))
- Gossip Girl (Bart Bass (Robert John Burke))
- Hawaii Five-0 (Captain Lou Grover (Chi McBride))
- Hitchcock (Whitfield Cook (Danny Huston))
- The Hunger Games: Catching Fire (Beetee (Jeffrey Wright))
- The Hunger Games: Mockingjay – Part 1 (Beetee (Jeffrey Wright))
- The Hunger Games: Mockingjay – Part 2 (Beetee (Jeffrey Wright))
- Just Go with It (Eddie Sims (Nick Swardson))
- Last Night in Soho (Lindsey (Terence Stamp))
- Lilacs (Steinway (Aleksey Kortnev))
- Marlowe (Bernie Ohls (Colm Meaney))
- My Blind Date with Life (Kleinschmidt (Johann von Bulow))
- Parasite (2021 NTV edition) (Oh Geun-sae (Park Myung-hoon))
- Peacemaker (August Smith / White Dragon (Robert Patrick))
- Piranha 3DD (Chet (David Koechner))
- Roman Holiday (2022 NTV edition) (Giovanni (Claudio Ermelli))
- Safe House (David Blackwell (Jason Merrells))
- Scream VI (Wayne Bailey (Dermot Mulroney))
- Sisu: Road to Revenge (Yeagor Draganov (Stephen Lang))
- Solo: A Star Wars Story (Tobias Beckett (Woody Harrelson))
- Somewhere in Queens (Leo Russo (Ray Romano))
- Sully (Jeff Skiles (Aaron Eckhart))
- Taken (Bernie Harris (David Warshofsky))
- Transformers: Dark of the Moon (Voshkod (Ravil Isyanov))
- Venom (Jack (Mac Brandt))
- Warrior (Samuel Blake (Christian McKay))
- Whitney Houston: I Wanna Dance with Somebody (Clive Davis (Stanley Tucci))
- The Wolf on Wall Street (Max Belfort (Rob Reiner))

==== Animation ====
- Code Lyoko (Jim Moralés)
- Fantastic Mr. Fox (Clive Badger)
- Hawaiian Vacation (Buttercup)
- Rango (Sergeant Turkey)
- Toy Story 3 (Buttercup)
- Toy Story 4 (Buttercup)
