= Risa Tsubaki =

Japanese voice actress

Risa Tsubaki (椿理沙, Tsubaki Risa; born September 8, 1979) is a female Japanese voice actress from Meguro, Tokyo affiliated with Mausu Promotion.

== Roles ==
=== Television animation ===
- Fighting Beauty Wulong Rebirth (Sachi)
- Ouran High School Host Club (Azusa Suwaki, Hina Usami)
- Recess (Japanese Dub) (Ashley Armbruster)

=== Video games ===
- Crash Boom Bang! (Coco Bandicoot)
- Izuna Legend of the Unemployed Ninja (Suiren, Tsubaki)

=== Drama CDs ===
- Mix Mix Chocolate (Schoolgirl 3)
