= Shōdai =

Shōdai may refer to:

- Shōdai (chant) (唱題), prolonged chanting of the daimoku (題目)
- Shōdai Naoya (正代 直也), a Japanese professional sumo wrestler born November 5, 1991
