= Edition =

Edition may refer to:

- Edition (book), a bibliographical term for a substantially similar set of copies
- Edition (printmaking), a publishing term for a set print run
- Edition (textual criticism), a particular version of a text
  - Diplomatics#Diplomatic_editions_and_transcription
  - Critical edition (opera)
- Edition Records, a British independent record label
- "Edition", a song by Rex Orange County
- Edition, one of brands of Marriott International

== See also ==
- Edition (publisher), a list of publishers
