= Masayo Hosono =

Japanese voice actress (born 1978)

- 細野 雅世
- Born: January 5, 1978 (age 48); Toyama Prefecture, Japan
- Occupation: Voice actress
- Years active: 2000-present

Masayo Hosono (細野 雅世, Hosono Masayo; born January 5, 1978 in Toyama Prefecture) is a Japanese voice actress. She started acting in 2000 and she's affiliated with Mausu Promotion, with her talent agency managed by Katsuta Voice Actor's Academy.

== Filmography ==
=== Anime television series ===
- Banner of the Stars
- Fighting Beauty Wulong - Debby Kroffat
- Gakuen Alice - Owl(Episode 4)
- Geisters - Chris Vesta, Tara-Chamarel
- Gallery Fake - Female Character
- Listen to Me, Girls. I Am Your Father! - Day Care Worker (Episodes 8, 10–12)
- Naruto - Ayame
- Naruto: Shippuden - Ayame
- Saiyuki Gunlock - Mother(Episodes 17)
- Saiyuki Reload - Sha Gojyo(child)(Episodes 5, 21); Young Hostess(Episodes 3)
- Scrapped Princess - Operator
- ToHeart Remember my Memories - Pupil(Episode 7)
- Tokyo Underground - Controller(Episode 20)

=== Anime OVAs ===
- Banner of the Stars III - Woman Prisoner, Crew B, Female
- Crest of the Stars Lost Chapter - Lina

=== Anime Films ===
- Naruto the Movie: Ninja Clash in the Land of Snow - Children
- WXIII: Patlabor the Movie 3

=== Games ===
- Sentimental Graffiti - Women's classmate, Evil Kid 2
- Full House Kiss - Emi Dōshi
- Full House Kiss 2 - Emi Dōshi, Schoolgirl
- killer7 - Ayame Blackburn
- Kingdom Hearts II - Additional Voices
- Naruto Ultimate Ninja - Ayame

=== Dubbing ===
==== Live-action films ====
- Burlesque – Georgia (Julianne Hough)
- The Dust Factory – Melanie Lewis (Hayden Panettiere)
- A Good Year – Christie Roberts (Abbie Cornish)
- Harry Potter and the Goblet of Fire
- The House Bunny – Joanne (Rumer Willis)
- Ice Princess – Additional Japanese Voice-Dubbing Role
- John Q. (2007 NTV edition) – Julie Byrd (Heather Wahlquist)
- Malèna
- The Suite Life Movie – Zack Martin (Dylan Sprouse)
- Torque – Additional Japanese Voice-Dubbing Role

==== Television ====
- 24 – Nicole Palmer (Megalyn Echikunwoke)
- Barney & Friends – Riff (replacing Michaela Dietz's voice)
- Lizzie McGuire – Melina Bianco (Carly Schroeder)
- Just for Kicks – Duran
- The Suite Life of Zack & Cody – Zack Martin (Dylan Sprouse)
- The Suite Life on Deck – Zack Martin (Dylan Sprouse)
- iCarly – Ms. Fielder (Cherise Bangs)

==== Animation ====
- Baby Looney Tunes – Baby Lola Bunny
- Curious George – Betsy
- The Grim Adventures of Billy & Mandy – Billy's Mom (Gladys), Mindy, Nergal Jr. and Eris
- The Buzz on Maggie – Maria Monarch

==== Commercials ====
- Disney Channel Games – Dylan Sprouse
