= Bạc Liêu (city) =

Former provincial city of the former Bạc Liêu province in Vietnam

Bạc Liêu Minh Hải
- Provincial city (Class-2)
- Bạc Liêu City; Thành phố Bạc Liêu
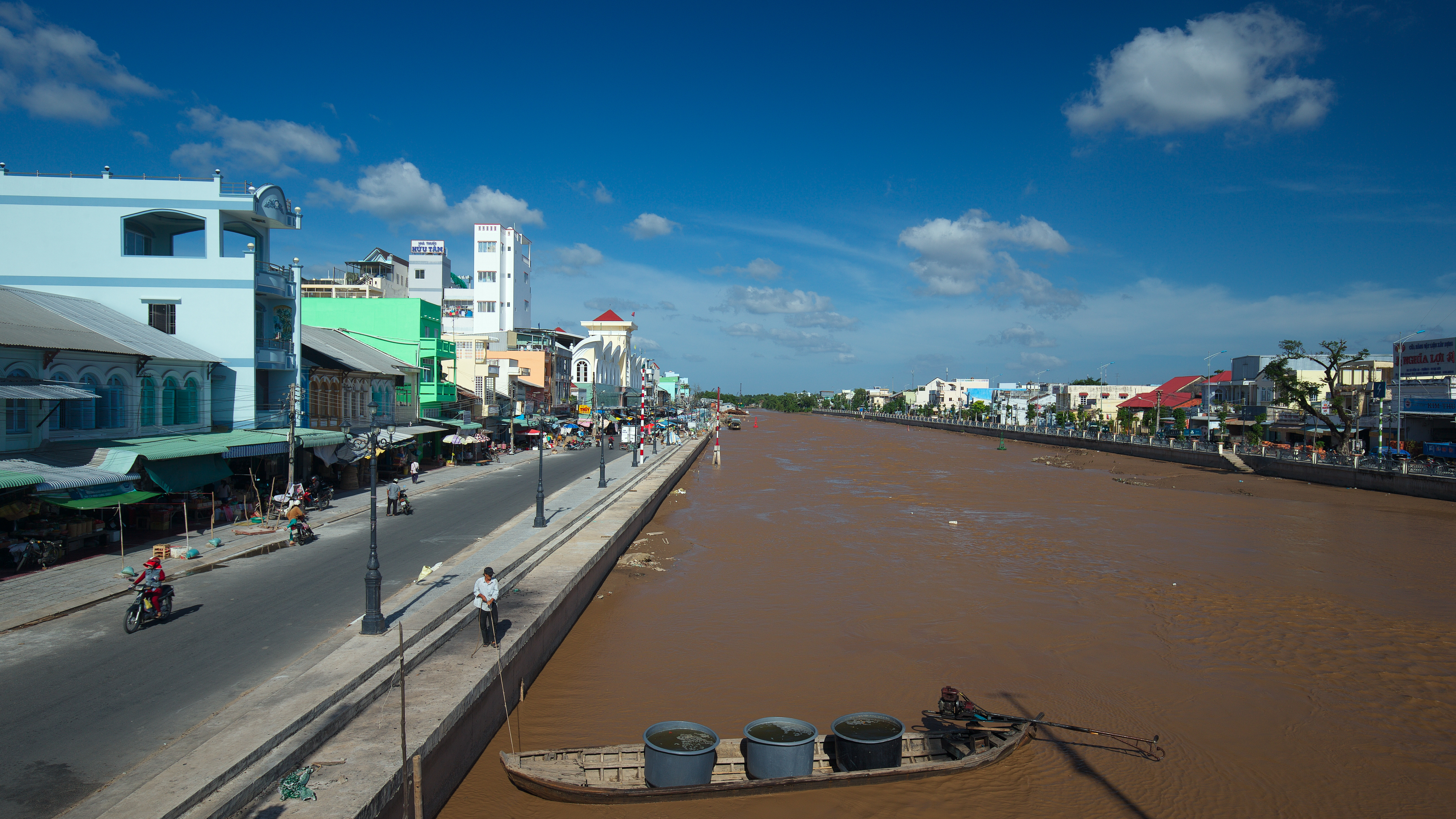
- Interactive map of Bạc Liêu
- Location of Bạc Liêu in Vietnam
- Coordinates: 9°17′N 105°43′E
- Country: Vietnam
- Province: Bạc Liêu

Area
  - Provincial city (Class-2): 175.25 km^{2} (67.66 sq mi)

Population (2019 census)
  - Provincial city (Class-2): 156,110
  - Density: 890.78/km^{2} (2,307.1/sq mi)
  - Urban: 115,508
- Time zone: UTC+7 (Indochina Time)
- Climate: Aw

Bạc Liêu (Vietnamese: [ɓàːk liəw]) is a former provincial city and capital of the former Bạc Liêu Province in the Mekong Delta region in southern Vietnam. It is a medium-sized town with a population of 156,110 in 2019. The former name of the city is Minh Hải.

== History ==
The name Bạc Liêu is based on the Chinese pronunciation of a Khmer name (Pol Leav ពលលាវ in Khmer). In the 1950s the area was a center of Huỳnh Phú Sổ's Hòa Hảo religion after Sổ was released there.

On June 16, 2025, the Standing Committee of the National Assembly issued Resolution No. 1685/NQ-UBTVQH15. The city was dissolved and new wards were rearranged from the district.

== Climate ==
Bạc Liêu has a tropical savanna climate (Köppen Aw).

Climate data for Bạc Liêu
| Month | Jan | Feb | Mar | Apr | May | Jun | Jul | Aug | Sep | Oct | Nov | Dec | Year |
|---|---|---|---|---|---|---|---|---|---|---|---|---|---|
| Record high °C (°F) | 34.3 (93.7) | 33.8 (92.8) | 34.6 (94.3) | 36.7 (98.1) | 36.5 (97.7) | 35.7 (96.3) | 33.8 (92.8) | 33.8 (92.8) | 34.2 (93.6) | 33.5 (92.3) | 33.5 (92.3) | 32.8 (91.0) | 36.7 (98.1) |
| Mean daily maximum °C (°F) | 29.8 (85.6) | 30.6 (87.1) | 31.7 (89.1) | 32.8 (91.0) | 32.6 (90.7) | 31.4 (88.5) | 30.8 (87.4) | 30.7 (87.3) | 30.5 (86.9) | 30.4 (86.7) | 30.3 (86.5) | 29.5 (85.1) | 30.9 (87.6) |
| Daily mean °C (°F) | 25.4 (77.7) | 26.0 (78.8) | 27.3 (81.1) | 28.6 (83.5) | 28.4 (83.1) | 27.6 (81.7) | 27.2 (81.0) | 27.0 (80.6) | 26.8 (80.2) | 26.7 (80.1) | 26.6 (79.9) | 25.6 (78.1) | 26.9 (80.4) |
| Mean daily minimum °C (°F) | 22.5 (72.5) | 23.1 (73.6) | 24.3 (75.7) | 25.4 (77.7) | 25.3 (77.5) | 25.1 (77.2) | 24.8 (76.6) | 24.6 (76.3) | 24.5 (76.1) | 24.5 (76.1) | 24.0 (75.2) | 23.0 (73.4) | 24.3 (75.7) |
| Record low °C (°F) | 16.1 (61.0) | 17.3 (63.1) | 18.1 (64.6) | 21.1 (70.0) | 21.2 (70.2) | 21.7 (71.1) | 21.4 (70.5) | 21.4 (70.5) | 21.8 (71.2) | 21.7 (71.1) | 18.1 (64.6) | 16.4 (61.5) | 16.1 (61.0) |
| Average rainfall mm (inches) | 5.2 (0.20) | 3.7 (0.15) | 13.9 (0.55) | 59.6 (2.35) | 201.3 (7.93) | 281.1 (11.07) | 273.9 (10.78) | 290.1 (11.42) | 309.3 (12.18) | 295.3 (11.63) | 173.2 (6.82) | 47.4 (1.87) | 1,954 (76.93) |
| Average rainy days | 2.0 | 0.9 | 1.6 | 4.9 | 16.1 | 20.7 | 22.2 | 21.8 | 23.2 | 22.1 | 13.8 | 6.5 | 155.7 |
| Average relative humidity (%) | 80.7 | 79.5 | 78.9 | 78.8 | 83.2 | 85.9 | 86.8 | 87.7 | 88.7 | 88.8 | 86.4 | 84.0 | 84.1 |
| Mean monthly sunshine hours | 239.3 | 255.0 | 291.9 | 271.7 | 206.0 | 166.2 | 177.8 | 172.4 | 156.1 | 168.8 | 193.5 | 205.8 | 2,505.8 |
Source 1: Vietnam Institute for Building Science and Technology
Source 2: The Yearbook of Indochina (1932-1933)
