= Tomica =

Tomica may refer to:

- Tomica (toy line), toy vehicles made by a Japanese company, Takara Tomy
- Tomica, Croatia, a village near Podcrkavlje
- Tomica (comics), a South African webcomic

== People ==
- Tomica, a South Slavic masculine given name. Notable people with the name include:
  - Tomica Milosavljević (born 1955), Serbian doctor and politician
  - Tomica Kocijan (born 1967), Croatian-born Austrian football player and manager
- Tomica (Czech feminine: Tomicová), a West Slavic surname. Notable people with the name include:
  - Marek Tomica (born 1981), Czech professional ice hockey
  - Pavla Tomicová (born 1962), Czech actress
