= Fourth Ward =

4th Ward may refer to:

== United States ==
- Old Fourth Ward, a neighborhood on the East side of Atlanta
- Fourth Ward, Charlotte, a ward of Charlotte, North Carolina
- 4th ward, Chicago, an aldermanic ward of Chicago
- Fourth Ward, Houston, a neighborhood of Houston
- 4th Ward of New Orleans, a ward of New Orleans
- 4th Ward, New York, a ward of New York City
- 4th ward, Chicago, an aldermanic ward of Chicago
- Ward 4 (coworking space)
- Ward 4, St. Louis City, an aldermanic ward of St. Louis
- Ward 4, one of the city subdivisions for neighborhoods of Washington, D.C.

== Other countries ==
- Ward 4, Vũng Tàu, Bà Rịa–Vũng Tàu province, Vietnam
- Ward 4, the name of several wards of Zimbabwe
- Kanata North Ward, or Ward 4, Ottawa, Ontario, Canada
