= Mitsuru Ogata =

Japanese voice actor

- 小形 満
- Born: March 24, 1961 (age 65); Aomori Prefecture, Japan
- Occupation: Voice actor
- Years active: 1989–present

Mitsuru Ogata (小形 満, Ogata Mitsuru; born March 24, 1961) is a Japanese voice actor. He is affiliated with Mausu Promotion.

== Filmography ==
=== Television animation ===
1998

- Detective Conan (Kenichi Hirai)
- Maico 2010 (Kacchin, Katsuo)

2001

- Baki the Grappler (Ian McGregor)

2002

- Mao Dante (Samael)

2003

- Astro Boy: Mighty Atom (Joe)
- Stellvia of the Universe (Miguel del Toro)

2004

- Agatha Christie's Great Detectives Poirot and Marple (Anman Dubon, Omāfī, Kinburu, Inspector Bēkon, others)
- KURAU Phantom Memory (Hajime)

2005

- Naruto (Sangorō)
- Starship Operators (Connelly, Louis Belmont)
- Tide-Line Blue (KC)

2006

- Crash B-Daman (Kyōsuke's father)
- D.Gray-man (Guzol)
- Death Note (Steve Mason)
- The Story of Saiunkoku (Shungai So-Taifuu)
- Utawarerumono (Orikakan)

2007

- Shugo Chara! (Kazuomi Hoshina)

2009

- Fullmetal Alchemist: Brotherhood (Mick)

2011

- Anohana: The Flower We Saw That Day (Atsushi Yadomi)
- Steins;Gate (Dr. Nakabachi)

2012

- High School DxD (Issei's father)

2014

- Argevollen (Eraldo Quasimodo)

2016
2017

- Natsume Yūjin-chō Roku (Homeroom Teacher)
- Food Wars! The Second Plate (Kakinoshin Ōizumi)

2019

- Star Twinkle PreCure (Harukichi Hoshina)
- Fruits Basket (Kazuma's Grandfather)

2021

- Resident Evil: Infinite Darkness (Ryan)

2023

Unknown date

- Azuki-chan (Gōzō)
- Black Cat (Rugdoll)
- Mahōjin Guru Guru (Tatejiwanezumi, Ragira, Tokuro, Kuroko, Shinto priest, villager, merchant, soldier, others)
- Pokémon (Growlithe, Arcanine, Xatu, others)
- Pokémon Advanced Generation (Tamuramaro)
- Viewtiful Joe (Charles the Third)

=== Theatrical animation ===
- Pokémon: The First Movie (1998) (Dragonite)
- Tokyo Godfathers (2003)
- My Hero Academia: Two Heroes (2018) (Samuel Abraham)

=== Video games ===
- AI: The Somnium Files – nirvanA Initiative (Chikara Horadori)
- Crash Bandicoot (Doctor Nitrus Brio (Brendan O'Brien))
- Crash Bandicoot 2: Cortex Strikes Back (Doctor Nitrus Brio (Brendan O'Brien))
- Crash Bash (Doctor Nitrus Brio (Brendan O'Brien), Rilla Roo)
- Crash Tag Team Racing (Doctor N. Gin (Nolan North))
- Dark Cloud 2 (Mayor Need, Mogley)
- Kingdom Hearts II (Piglet (Travis Oates))
- Crash Bandicoot: N-Sane Trilogy (Doctor Nitrus Brio (Maurice LaMarche))
- JoJo's Bizarre Adventure: All-Star Battle (Steven Steel)
- JoJo's Bizarre Adventure: Eyes of Heaven (Steven Steel)
- Kingdom Hearts III (Piglet (Travis Oates))
- Night Trap (Eddie (William Bertrand))
- Shinobido: Way of the Ninja (Bodyguard)
- Tenchu 2: Birth of the Stealth Assassins (Semimaru)
- The Last Remnant (Pagus)
- The Witcher 3: Wild Hunt (Vesemir)

=== Tokusatsu ===
- Mahou Sentai Magiranger (2005) (Hades God Titan (eps. 35 - 46))
- Tensou Sentai Goseiger (2010) (Gubydal Alien Zaruwakku of the UFO (ep. 2))
- Uchu Sentai Kyuranger (2017) (Gyapler (ep. 24))

=== Dubbing roles ===
==== Live-action ====
- The Adjustment Bureau (Charlie Traynor (Michael Kelly))
- Alice in Wonderland (Tweedledee and Tweedledum (Matt Lucas))
- Alice Through the Looking Glass (Tweedledee and Tweedledum (Matt Lucas))
- Ant-Man (Dale (Gregg Turkington))
- Ant-Man and the Wasp: Quantumania (Dale (Gregg Turkington))
- Barbarian (Frank (Richard Brake))
- Batman Begins (Joe Chill (Richard Brake))
- The Benchwarmers (Richie Goodman (David Spade))
- Born to Raise Hell (Costel (Darren Shahlavi))
- Christopher Robin (Piglet)
- The Conjuring 2 (Maurice Grosse (Simon McBurney))
- The Devil Wears Prada (Nigel Kipling (Stanley Tucci))
- Dr. No (Major Boothroyd (Peter Burton))
- The Event (Blake Sterling (Željko Ivanek))
- Fantastic Four (Military Interrogator (Michael 'Mick' Harrity))
- The Grey (Jerome Talget (Dermot Mulroney))
- The Guest (Spencer Peterson (Leland Orser))
- Gun Shy (Elliott (Richard Schiff))
- Hart's War (Captain Lutz (Dugald Bruce Lockhart))
- Hatching Pete (Coach Mackey (Brian Stepanek))
- The Heartbreak Kid (Mac (Rob Corddry))
- Holmes & Watson (Inspector Lestrade (Rob Brydon))
- Home Alone 3 (2019 NTV edition), (Techie (Kevin Gudahl))
- A Life Less Ordinary (Elliot Zweikel (Stanley Tucci))
- The Matrix (Choi (Marc Gray))
- Miss Peregrine's Home for Peculiar Children (Franklin "Frank" Portman (Chris O'Dowd))
- Mission: Impossible – Dead Reckoning Part One (NSA (Mark Gatiss))
- The Motorcycle Diaries (Ernesto Guevara Lynch (Jean Pierre Noher))
- NCIS (Stan Burley (Joel Gretsch))
- Nebraska (Ross Grant (Bob Odenkirk))
- No Sudden Move (Matt Wertz (David Harbour))
- Not One Less (Mayor Tian (Tian Zhenda))
- Oz (Tim McManus (Terry Kinney))
- The Three Stooges (Larry (Sean Hayes))
- Trainspotting (Daniel "Spud" Murphy (Ewen Bremner))
- T2 Trainspotting (Daniel "Spud" Murphy (Ewen Bremner))

==== Animation ====
- The Adventures of Tintin (Aristides Silk)
- Animaniacs (Doctor Otto Scratchansniff)
- Batman: The Animated Series (Ventriloquist, Scarface)
- The Book of Pooh (Piglet)
- Cars 2 (Otis)
- House of Mouse (Pluto's Angel)
- DuckTales (Scrooge McDuck)
- Home Movies (Erik Robbins)
- Justice League (Doctor Destiny)
- Looney Tunes (Marvin the Martian) (succeeding Kazuhiro Nakata)
- Mighty Morphin Power Rangers (Samurai Fan Man)
- My Friends Tigger & Pooh (Piglet)
- Piglet's Big Movie (Piglet)
- Pinky Dinky Doo (Mr. Guinea Pig)
- Planes: Fire & Rescue (Cad Spinner)
- Pooh's Heffalump Movie (Piglet)
- Sofia the First (Cedric the Sorcerer)
- South Park (Kenny McCormick, Tweek Tweak, Philip Pirrup, Marvin Marsh, Gerald Broflovski, Jimbo Kern, Towelie)
- Space Jam: A New Legacy (Marvin the Martian)
- Tiny Toon Adventures (Gogo Dodo)
- Turning Red (Mr. Kieslowski)
- Winnie-the-Pooh (Piglet (second voice))
- X-Men (Morph)

==== Puppetry ====
- Muppets Tonight (Miss Piggy)
