= Makoto Ishii =

Japanese voice actor

- 石井 真
- Born: February 24, 1976 (age 50); Chiba Prefecture, Japan
- Occupation: Voice actor
- Years active: 2001–present
- Agent: Rimax

Makoto Ishii (石井 真, Ishii Makoto; born February 24, 1976) is a Japanese voice actor from Chiba Prefecture. He is currently affiliated with Rimax.

== Filmography ==
=== Television animation ===
- 2003: Ghost in the Shell: Stand Alone Complex as Tsujisaki Yū, Hotel man
- 2004–2023: Fafner in the Azure as Kazuki Makabe
- 2004: Futakoi as Yūya Hiyama
- 2004: Pokémon Advanced Generation as Jimmy
- 2004: Uninhabited Planet Survive! (Louis)
- 2005: Yakitate!! Japan (Main doctor, Kaname Hiroshi)
- 2005: Black Jack as Largo
- 2006: Pururun! Shizuku-Chan as Namida-kun
- 2007: Ōkiku Furikabutte as Kyōhei Akimaru
- 2008: True Tears as Shinichirō Nakagami
- 2009: Shangri-La as Kunihito Kusanagi
- 2009: Guin Saga as Asturias
- 2010–2013: Pocket Monsters: Best Wishes as Cress (2 seasons)
- 2011: Mirai Nikki as Masumi Nishijima
- 2016: JoJo's Bizarre Adventure: Diamond Is Unbreakable as Masazō Kinoto, Cheap Trick
- 2016: Maho Girls PreCure! as François (ep. 38 onwards)
- 2018: Nil Admirari no Tenbin: Teito Genwaku Kitan as Tōichiro Sasagoi
- 2019–2022: Arifureta: From Commonplace to World's Strongest 2nd Season as Mikhail
- 2024: Blue Miburo as Matsudaira Katamori
- 2026: A Misanthrope Teaches a Class for Demi-Humans as Satoru Hoshino

=== Video games ===
- 2006: Crash Boom Bang! as Crash Bandicoot, Fake Crash
- 2008: Tales of Vesperia as Repede
- 2009: Tears to Tiara as Arthur
- 2013: Super Robot Wars UX as Kazuki Makabe
- 2016: Honkai Impact 3rd - A Post Honkai Odyssey as Main Character
- 2017: Another Eden as Seven, Benedict

=== Dubbing ===
Original year	Dub year	Title	Role	Original actor	Notes	Ref
2003–2006		Teen Titans	Thunder and Lightning	S. Scott Bullock, Quinton Flynn		
2006		Alpha Dog	Zack Mazursky	Anton Yelchin		
