= Daiki Nakamura =

Daiki Nakamura may refer to:

- Daiki Nakamura (actor) (born 1962)
- Hokutofuji Daiki (sumo wrestler, born 1992 as Daiki Nakamura)
- Ōnosato Daiki (sumo wrestler born 2000 as Daiki Nakamura)
