= Eighth Ward =

Eighth Ward may refer to:

- 8th Ward of New Orleans, a ward of New Orleans
- Ward 8 (cocktail), a whiskey-based cocktail
- 8th ward, Chicago, an aldermanic ward of Chicago
- Ward 8, St. Louis City, an aldermanic ward of St. Louis
- Ward 8, one of the neighborhoods of Washington, D.C.
- Ward 8, the name of several wards of Zimbabwe
- College Ward, Ottawa (also known as Ward 8)
- Ward 8 Eglinton—Lawrence, Toronto
- Ward 8 (Hamilton, Ontario), Canada
