= Yomigaeru Sora – Rescue Wings =

Television anime

- The DVD cover of Yomigaeru Sora - Rescue Wings

よみがえる空
- Anime television series
- Directed by: Katsushi Sakurabi
- Produced by: Kiyoshi Sugiyama; Yuji Matsukura
- Written by: Fumihiko Takayama
- Music by: Hayato Matsuo
- Studio: J.C.Staff
- Original network: TV Tokyo, Animax
- Original run: January 8, 2006 – March 26, 2006
- Episodes: 12 + OVA
- Live-action film

Sora e: Sukui no Tsubasa Rescue Wings
- Directed by: Masaaki Tezuka
- Music by: Kaoru Wada
- Studio: Kadokawa Pictures
- Released: December 13, 2008 (Japan)
- Runtime: 108 min
- Manga

Sora e Rescue Wings
- Written by: Tommy Ohtsuka
- Magazine: Monthly Comic Flapper
- Original run: June 4, 2005 – July 5, 2007
- Volumes: 4

Yomigaeru Sora – Rescue Wings (Japanese: よみがえる空 - Rescue Wings-) is a Japanese anime television series animated by J.C.Staff which aired on TV Tokyo from January to March 2006. The main character is 2nd Lieutenant Uchida Kazuhiro, a helicopter pilot in a search and rescue wing of the Japan Air Self Defense Force (JASDF). The anime is a part of the Rescue Wings media franchise produced by Bandai Visual which also includes a live-action film released in 2008, where the main character is a female pilot played by Yuko Takayama, as well as two manga series with different stories focusing on search and rescue squads and personnel.

The real life JASDF Komatsu Air Base hosts a search and rescue wing in addition to two fighter wings with F-15J's and T-4's as portrayed in the anime. JDS Haruna (DDH-141), on which Hongou lands on to refuel in Episode 3, is a real ship of the JMSDF.

== Synopsis ==
Uchida Kazuhiro joined the JASDF hoping to fly fighter jets, however midway through the pilot training program he was transferred to the rescue helicopter course and was eventually deployed to the Komatsu Rescue Squad as a SAR helicopter pilot. Initially depressed at his assignment, Uchida's experiences eventually cause him to change his mind.

== Episodes ==
1. 「はじめての仕事」(The First Job)
2. 「困難な仕事」(A Difficult Job)
3. 「苦しい仕事」(A Painful Job)
4. 「大切な人」(Precious One)
5. 「必要なこと」(Necessity)
6. 「Bright Side of Life 前編」(Bright Side of Life, Part I)
7. 「Bright Side of Life 後編」(Bright Side of Life, Part II)
8. 「少年の旅路 前編」(A Boy's Journey, Part I)
9. 「少年の旅路 後編」(A Boy's Journey, Part II)
10. 「パーティー」(Party)
11. 「ビバーク」(Bivouac)
12. 「レスキュー」(Rescue)
13. 「最後の仕事」(A Last Job)(Final)(DVD Release)

== Cast ==
- Hasegawa Megumi: Noto Mamiko
- Hirata Kazuhiko: Ii Atsushi
- Hongo Shujiro: Unshō Ishizuka
- Kosaka Takashi: Shimura Tomoyuki
- Motomura: Shōzō Iizuka
- Murakami Ryunosuke: Hoshino Mitsuaki
- Nihonmatsu Daigo: Masaya Onosaka
- Nishida Kazumi: Kasahara Rumi
- Ogata: Shinya Fukumatsu
- Shaura Ryoko: Ai Sato
- Uchida Kazuhiro: Miyazaki Issei
- Uchida Misae: Takamura Hisae
- Yumi: Makiko Ōmoto

== Production ==
The Blu-Ray version was released in Japan on November 22, 2018. The release was timed to celebrate the 60th anniversary of the JASDF's Air Rescue Wing. In 2017, scholar Takayoshi Yamamura noted that anime was produced in the collaboration with the JASDF.
