= Minoru Inaba =

Japanese actor and voice actor

- Born: Shizuoka Prefecture, Japan
- Occupation: Voice actor
- Years active: 1975-present

Minoru Inaba (稲葉 実, Inaba Minoru) is a Japanese voice actor from Shizuoka Prefecture. He is affiliated with Ken Production.

Inaba is best known for his roles in Disney productions (as Dale), Buzz Lightyear of Star Command (as Buzz Lightyear), and The Transformers (as Cyclonus and Razorclaw). He also voiced as Gaogao-san the anthropomorphic Lion Scientist in the Shimajiro TV series and Shimajiro film series.

== Filmography ==
=== Television animation ===
1979

- The Ultraman – Fisherman
- Kagaku Ninja-Tai Gatchaman F – Gyarakuta members

1980

- Nodoka Mori no Dobutsu Daisakusen – Adam
- Space Runaway Ideon – Rekuran
- Space Warrior Baldios – Morgan, Robot Soldiers

1981

- Golden Warrior Gold Lightan – Futoshi "Bikku" Mizumi
- Voltron – Cobra
- Belle and Sebastian – Barber, Pastor, General Store

1982

- Gyakuten! Ippatsuman – Sankano & Tome
- Super Dimension Fortress Macross – Linn Shaochin, Maistroff, Oigul
- Warrior of Love Rainbowman – Doctor Giruma

1983

- Mirai Keisatsu Urashiman – Joe
- Akū Daisakusen Srungle – Sazaar
- Armored Trooper Votoms – Mekitto
- Creamy Mami, the Magic Angel – Hiroshi, Shingo's Father
- Cat's Eye – Shunzo Kagawa
- Ginga Hyōryū Vifam – Mel's father

1984

- Super Dimension Cavalry Southern Cross – Capt. George Lombar
- Once Upon a Time... Space – Pierre
- Yoroshiku Mechadock – Marukawa

1985

- Touch – Sakada
- Blue Comet SPT Layzner – Building, James, John

1986

- Uchūsen Sagittarius – Gamin President
- Mobile Suit Gundam ZZ – Dune, Magany
- Seishun Anime Zenshu – Takashima
- Machine Robo: Revenge of Cronos – Grujios, Dart, Guruzios
- Sangokushi II: Tenkakeru Hideotachi – Military commander
- Fight! Super Robot Lifeform Transformers – Cyclonus, Razorclaw/Predaking, Scattershot, Swerve

1987

- City Hunter – Sabou
- Mami the Psychic – Yamada
- Machine Robo: The Running Battlehackers – Sorikondar, Rikimines

1988

- Tatakae!! Ramenman – Longwei, Miedeyama, Zhanma
- Sakigake!! Otokojuku – J.J. George
- Mashin Hero Wataru – Don Goro, Zan Kokku
- Oishinbo – Tamio Hidesawa

1989

- Bio Armor Ryger – Captain Katagiri
- Lupin III: Bye Bye Liberty Crisis – TV Announcer
- Miracle Giants Domu-kun – Motoshi Fujita
- Madö King Granzört – Casino, Huge Whale, Tulip
- Blue Blink – Editor
- City Hunter 3 – Ambassador
- Yawara! A Fashionable Judo Girl – Coach Ishikura
- Magical Hat – CO2

1990

- Mashin Hero Wataru 2 – Dotsuitaru Shougun, Marudaruma, Mutchirini
- Nadia: The Secret of Blue Water – Captain Neoatoran
- Tasuke, the Samurai Cop – Hey-ji, Man A (episode 8), Pedestrian (episode 3)

1991

- The Brave of Sun Fighbird – Captain
- Future GPX Cyber Formula – Announcer
- Matchless Raijin-Oh – Satan Jr., Yakuza A (episode 5)
- Armored Police Metal Jack – Chief Shirogazaki
- 21 Emon – Yamada-Sensei
- Dear Brother – Mathematics Teacher

1992

- Mama wa Shōgaku 4 Nensei – Daisaku Yamaguchi
- The Wonderful Galaxy of Oz – Aruherihito
- YuYu Hakusho – Iwamoto, Ogyoku

1993

- Little Women II: Jo's Boys – Engineer
- The Brave Express Might Gaine – Upper
- Kenyū Densetsu Yaiba – Miyoshi Seikai Nyudo
- Nintama Rantarō – Judayu Unazuki, Tobizou Katou
- Shima Shima Tora no Shimajirō – Gaogao-san (voice)

1994

- Mobile Fighter G Gundam – Jack in Dia
- Yamato Takeru – Baafs, King, Germain, Inaba, Coyotes
- Magical Circle Guru Guru – Kasegigorudo, Tatejiwa, Ukka XII, Agubyi

1995

- Magic Knight Rayearth – Innkeeper
- Ninku – Byakko
- Romeo and the Black Brothers – Rizzo
- Wild Knights Gulkeeva – Mirage
- Mobile Suit Gundam Wing – Dr. J
- Soar High! Isami – Golden Tengu
- Dokkan! Robotendon – Garapon father, Doctor

1996

- Saint Tail – Fukuyama
- Rurouni Kenshin – Sakata, Tsukio
- Famous Dog Lassie – Henry
- Brave Command Dagwon – Desukoppu
- Midori no Makibaō – Beard cyclone
- After War Gundam X – Rike Anto
- Baby & Me – Kindergarten Principal's Older Brother
- Chōja Reideen – Dorsal

1997

- Speed Racer – Daisuke Hibiki
- The King of Braves GaoGaiGar – Producer
- In The Beginning – The Bible Stories – Ham
- Slayers Try – Firioneru = El-di = Seirun
- Chō Mashin Eiyūden Wataru – Kāmēn
- Fortune Quest L – Anri

1998

- Berserk – General White Tiger
- Gasaraki – Gen. Wayne

1999

- Chiisana Kyojin Microman – Chain Spider
- Jibaku-kun – Jiya
- Infinite Ryvius – Yoshikichi Shimomura
- Weekly Story Land – Teacher, Uncle, Salaryman
- Gozonji! Gekkō Kamen-kun – Valiance Alien

2000

- Inspector Fabre – Chief Valerie
- Brigadoon: Marin & Melan – Doctor
- Argento Soma – Director
- Hiwou War Chronicles – Tadanari Iwase

2001

- Project ARMS – Stinger
- Crush Gear Turbo – Ichidou Takekura

2002

- Seven of Seven – Handa
- Daigunder – Shuriman
- Atashin'chi – Colleague
- Witch Hunter Robin – The Professor
- Ghost in the Shell: Stand Alone Complex – Maritime Self-Defense Forces Colonel
- Mobile Suit Gundam SEED – William Sutherland
- Barom-1 – Shiratori Kenichi

2003

- Detective School Q – Hiromichi Kamihara
- Rumic Theater – Doctor
- Mermaid Forest – Soukichi
- Gilgamesh – Doctor

2004

- Madlax – Senior Managing Director
- Monster – Former Secretary
- Gigantor – Chief Ohtsuka
- Kurau Phantom Memory – Director Saito
- Beet the Vandel Buster – Mugain
- Black Jack – Tsubo-chan
- Yakitate!! Japan – Yulrich Rame

2005

- Kaiketsu Zorori – Wandokku Doctor, Witch
- Kotenkotenko – Dharma, Elder Bag
- Mobile Suit Gundam SEED Destiny – William Sutherland

2006

- Ayakashi: Samurai Horror Tales – Takuetsu
- The Story of Saiunkoku – Seikintou leader
- Powerpuff Girls Z – Silk Hat
- Project Blue Earth SOS – Tony Kimura
- Kemonozume – Kyuutarou Ohba
- Fist of the Blue Sky – Tian Xuefang
- Code Geass – Atsushi Sawazaki
- Bartender – Ryuuji Mineyama

2007

- The Story of Saiunkoku Second Series – Danna Dai
- Kaze no Stigma – Hyoue Kazamaki
- Mononoke – Sakae Kadowaki
- Shigurui: Death Frenzy – Mariko Hikobe
- Neuro: Supernatural Detective – Kouji Umino
- Blue Drop – Hasegawa
- Rental Magica – Principal
- Elec-king The Animation – Sleepy Dad, Kaito, Director

2008

- GeGeGe no Kitarō – Guha, Hata-on-ryou, Hyakuma
- Our Home's Fox Deity – Minamoto-san
- Hakken Taiken Daisuki! Shimajirō – Gao-Gao
- Top Secret ~The Revelation~ – Soichi Enoki
- Slayers Revolution – Philionel El Di Seyruun
- Yakushiji Ryōko no Kaiki Jikenbo – Inspector Maruoka

2009

- Hajime no Ippo: New Challenger – Mr. Sakaguchi
- Mazinger Edition Z: The Impact! – Count Brocken
- Cross Game – Coach Sentarō Maeno
- Sōten Kōro – Yan Zhong
- Inuyasha: The Final Act – Master of Potions

2010

- Lilpri – Urashima
- Shimajirou Hesoka – Gaogao-san
- Stitch!: Zutto Saikō no Tomodachi – Tarou Nomimon

2011

- Gosick – Maurice
- Dororon Enma-kun – Shappoji
- Tamayura: Hitotose – Fū's grandfather
- One Piece – Neptune, Naguri

2012

- Aquarion Evol – Elco

2013

- Gundam Build Fighters – Chin'an Shishō
- Pokémon Origins – Old Man Fuji

2014

- Shimajirō to Kujira no Uta – Gaogao-San (voice)

2015

- Shimajirō to Ōkina Ki – Gaogao-San (voice)
- Overlord – Khajiit Dale Badantel (episodes 5, 6, 8 & 9)

2016

- Shimajirō to Ehon no Kuni ni – Gaogao-san (voice)
- My Hero Academia – Dr. Tsubasa
- One Piece – Monjii
- Rin-ne – Kuroida (episode 35)

2017

- Shimajirō to Niji no Oashisu – Gaogao-San (voice)

2018

- B: The Beginning – Boris Meier
- Legend of the Galactic Heroes: Die Neue These – Emperor Friedrich IV

2019

- Shimajiro to Ururu no Heroland – Gaogao-san (voice)

2021

- Shimajiro to Sora Tobufune – Gaogao-san (voice)
- B: The Beginning Succession – Boris Meier
- The Faraway Paladin – Bagley

=== Theatrical animation ===
- Ninja Hattori-kun + Paaman Chō-Nōryoku Wars (1984) – Man
- Grey: Digital Target (1986) – Mei
- Venus Wars (1989) – Bartender
- Mobile Suit Gundam F91 (1991) – Boris
- Doraemon: Nobita's Three Visionary Swordsmen (1994) – Squad Leader
- Doraemon: Nobita's Diary on the Creation of the World (1995) – Yorimitsu Minamoto
- Eiga Nintama Rantarō (1996) – Tobizou
- Slayers Return (1996) – Elderly Sorcerer
- Well Gree Slayers (1997) – Old Man
- Daigekisen! Microman VS Saikyō Senshi Gorgon (1999) – Chain Spider
- Gundress (1999) – Ali Jaheeve Hassan
- Doraemon: Nobita and the Legend of the Sun King (2000) – Doctor
- Detective Conan: Jolly Roger in the Deep Azure (2007) – Kamitaira
- Summer Days with Coo (2007) – Husband
- Tetsujin 28-go: Hakuchū no Zangetsu (2007) – Chief Ohtsuka
- Professor Layton and the Eternal Diva (2009) – Don Paolo
- Detective Conan: The Eleventh Striker (2012) – Koji Matsuzaki
- Dokidoki! PreCure the Movie: Mana's Getting Married!!? The Dress of Hope Tied to the Future! (2013) – Silver Clock
- Shimajiro and Fufu's Big Adventure (2013) – Gaogao-san
- Shimajiro and the Whale's Song (2014) – Gaogao-san
- Shimajiro and the Mother Tree (2015) – Gaogao-san
- Shimajiro in Bookland (2016) – Gaogao-san
- Shimajiro and the Rainbow Oasis (2017) – Gaogao-san
- Shimajiro the Movie: Adventures on Magic Island (2018) – Gaogao-san
- Shimajiro the Movie: Shimajiro and Ururu's Hero Island (2019) – Gaogao-san
- Qiaohu and the Fantastic Flying Ship (2019) – Gaogao-san (Japanese Dub)
- Shimajirō to Kirakira Ōkoku no Ōji-sama (2022) – Gaogao-san

=== OVAs ===
- The Samurai (1987) – Kagemaru Toki
- Kizuoibito (1988) – Colonel White
- Assemble Insert (1989) – Old Man, Prime Minister
- Mobile Suit Gundam 0083: Stardust Memory (1991) – Villy Gradoll

=== Video games ===
- Langrisser: Kōki no Matsuei (1993) – Albert
- Langrisser III (1996) – William, Christ, Gaieru, Glob, Ovu~a
- Langrisser V: The End of the Legend (1998) – Gaieru, Gorudori
- Ape Escape (1999) – Poppa
- Gunparade March (2000) -
- Tetsujin 28-go (2004) – Chief Ohtsuka
- Mobile Suit Gundam: The One Year War (2005) – Woody Malden
- Beet the Vandel Buster (2005) – Mugain
- The Sword of Etheria (2005) – Toto
- Soulcalibur III (2005) – Rock
- Kingdom Hearts II (2005) – Dale
- Professor Layton and the Curious Village (2007) – Don Paolo
- Kingdom Hearts Final Mix II (2007) – Dale
- Professor Layton and the Diabolical Box (2007) – Don Paolo
- Code Geass: Lelouch of the Rebellion: Lost Colors (2008) – Sawazaki
- Professor Layton and the Unwound Future (2008) – Don Paolo
- Kingdom Hearts Coded (2009) – Dale
- Tales of Vesperia (2009) – Boniface
- Kingdom Hearts Birth by Sleep (2010) – Dale
- Uncharted 3: Drake's Deception (2011) – Ramses
- Glass Heart Princess (2012) – Osamu Himeno Kado
- Kingdom Hearts HD 2.5 Remix (2014) – Dale (New and Archived Footage)
- Batman: Arkham Knight (2015) – Alfred Pennyworth

=== Tokusatsu ===
- Juukou B-Fighter (1995) – Mega Hercules (episodes 38 & 51)
- Choukou Senshi Changéríon (1996) – Deringer (episode 26)

=== Dubbing roles ===
==== Live-action ====
- Armageddon (2002 Fuji TV edition) – Flight Director Clark (Chris Ellis)
- Armored – Duncan Ashcroft (Fred Ward)
- Asteroid – The President (Denis Arndt)
- Bad Boys II – Alexei (Peter Stormare)
- Batman Begins – Carmine Falcone (Tom Wilkinson)
- The Benchwarmers – Mel Carmichael (Jon Lovitz)
- The Big Lebowski (VHS/DVD edition) – Malibu Police Chief (Leon Russom)
- Chain Reaction – Lyman Earl Collier (Brian Cox)
- Chernobyl – Boris Shcherbina (Stellan Skarsgård)
- Christmas with the Kranks – Vic Frohmeyer (Dan Aykroyd)
- The Closer – Andy Flynn (Anthony Denison)
- Cloud Atlas – Haskell Moore, Tadeusz Kesselring, Bill Smoke, Nurse Noakes, Boardman Mephi, Old Georgie (Hugo Weaving)
- The Comebacks – Coach Lambeau Fields (David Koechner)
- Con Air (2000 TV Asahi edition) – Earl "Swamp Thing" Williams (M. C. Gainey)
- CSI: NY – Sid Hammerback (Robert Joy)
- Daredevil – Leland Owlsley (Bob Gunton)
- Deep Impact – Alan Rittenhouse (James Cromwell)
- Die Hard with a Vengeance – Businessman, Felix Little
- Die Hard with a Vengeance (1999 TV Asahi edition) – Dr. Fred Schiller (Stephen Pearlman)
- Dog Eat Dog – Grecco the Greek (Paul Schrader)
- Don Juan DeMarco – Dr. Paul Showalter (Bob Dishy)
- The Double – Tom Highland (Martin Sheen)
- Dragonworld – Brownie McGee (Jim Dunk)
- Dudley Do-Right – Kumquat Chief (Alex Rocco)
- Ed – Tommy Lasorda
- Ed Wood – The Amazing Criswell (Jeffrey Jones)
- Exorcist: The Beginning – Chuma
- Falling Down (1997 TV Asahi edition) – Mr. Lee (Michael Paul Chan)
- The Fast and the Furious – Tanner (Ted Levine)
- Gandhi – Reginald Dyer (Edward Fox)
- Genius – Albert Einstein (Geoffrey Rush)
- The Goonies – Mr. Perkins (Curt Hanson)
- Gothika – Sheriff Ryan (John Carroll Lynch)
- Henry's Crime – Max Saltzman (James Caan)
- The Hobbit: An Unexpected Journey – Glóin (Peter Hambleton)
- The Hobbit: The Desolation of Smaug – Glóin (Peter Hambleton)
- Hoffa – Bobby Ciaro (Danny DeVito)
- The Hunt for Red October – Senior Lieutenant Ivan Putin (Peter Firth)
- I Love Trouble – The Thin Man (James Rebhorn)
- Jacob's Ladder – Frank (Eriq La Salle)
- Jennifer's Body – Mr. Wroblewski (J. K. Simmons)
- Jingle All the Way – Mall Santa (Jim Belushi)
- Julie & Julia – Paul Child (Stanley Tucci)
- Last Action Hero (2001 TV Asahi edition) – John Practice (F. Murray Abraham)
- Léon: The Professional (1997 VHS edition) – Fatman (Frank Senger), Receptionist (George Martin)
- The Mandalorian and Grogu – Garazeb "Zeb" Orrelios (Steve Blum)
- The Mask – Lt. Mitch Kellaway (Peter Riegert)
- Mike and Dave Need Wedding Dates – Burt Stangle (Stephen Root)
- Miracles – Ah Tong (Billy Lau)
- Mission: Impossible 2 – Dr. Vladimir Nekhorvich (Rade Šerbedžija)
- Pecker – Jimmy (Mark Joy)
- Pitch Black (2014 Blu-ray and DVD editions) – Abu 'Imam' al-Walid (Keith David)
- The Player – Tom Oakley (Richard E. Grant)
- The Preacher's Wife – Joe Hamilton (Gregory Hines)
- Red Eye – Joe Reisert (Brian Cox)
- Shallow Grave – Detective Inspector McCall (Ken Stott)
- Shaolin Soccer – Iron Shirt (Tin Kai-man)
- Shazam! Fury of the Gods – Wolf Blitzer
- Snake Eyes – Jimmy George (Michael Rispoli)
- Star Trek: Deep Space Nine – Quark (Armin Shimerman)
- Stuart Little (1999) – Boat Race Announcer (Stan Freberg)
- The Terminator – Dr. Silberman (Earl Boen)
- The Thing – Dr. Sander Halvorson (Ulrich Thomsen)
- Today You Die – Agent Saunders (Nick Mancuso)
- Unaccompanied Minors – Oliver Porter (Lewis Black)
- Wall Street: Money Never Sleeps – Investor (Oliver Stone)

==== Animation ====
- Disney productions – Dale
- Animaniacs – Pesto
- Bee Movie – Martin B. Benson
- Buzz Lightyear of Star Command – Buzz Lightyear
- Chicken Little – Principal Fetchit
- Chip 'n Dale Rescue Rangers (second dub) – Dale
- Dragon Storm – Theldag
- Happy Feet – Nestor
- Happy Feet Two – Nestor
- Finding Nemo – Philip Sherman
- The Lorax – Uncle Ubb
- Over the Hedge – Vincent
- Recess – Principal Prickly
- The Simpsons – Ned Flanders, Moe Szyslak
- The Simpsons Movie – Moe Szyslak (theater and DVD edition), Ned Flanders (DVD edition)
- The Transformers – Cyclonus, Razorclaw, Scattershot, others
- Treasure Planet – Doctor Delbert Doppler
- Cars – Van, Jay Limo
- Cars 2 – Van
- Shrek series – Magic Mirror
- Shrek Forever After – Pig #3

== See also ==
- Minoru Inaba at Anime News Network's encyclopedia
