= Yamato Takeru (disambiguation) =

Yamato Takeru may refer to:

- Yamato Takeru (c. 72 – 114), a Japanese legendary prince of the imperial dynasty, son of Keikō of Yamato
- Yamato Takeru (TV series), an anime loosely related to the legend about a young boy who goes onto a great adventure
- Yamato Takeru (film), a 1994 Japanese film (known as Orochi the Eight Headed Dragon in the U.S.)
