= Hiroyuki Takahashi =

Hiroyuki Takahashi may refer to:

- Hiroyuki Takahashi (game producer) (高橋 宏之; born 1957), Japanese video game producer and designer
- Hiroyuki Takahashi (writer) (高橋 宏幸; born 1923), Japanese children's writer; author of the book adapted for the 1987 film The Foxes of Chironup Island
