= Ai Satō =

Japanese actress and voice actress

Ai Satō (さとう あい, Satō Ai; born February 12, 1955) is a Japanese actress and voice actress working with Ken Production.

== Filmography ==
=== Anime ===
==== 1969 ====
- Sazae-san (Mariko Hasegawa)

==== 1985 ====
- Ninja Robots (Francois Queen, Maria)

==== 1986 ====
- Anmitsu Hime (Chāshū, Kanoko's Mother)
- Pastel Yumi, the Magic Idol (Tsuyoshi)

==== 1987 ====
- Kimagure Orange Road (Female Teacher)

==== 1988 ====
- City Hunter 2 (Princess Angela)

==== 1989 ====
- Idol Densetsu Eriko (Yuki)
- Esper Mami (Junpei's Mother)
- Time Travel Tondekeman (Ababara, Alien Type Yakan, Mamatedekeman)
- YAWARA! a fashionable judo girl (Kristin Adams)

==== 1990 ====
- Brave Exkaiser (Yoko Hoshikawa)

==== 1991 ====
- Oishinbo (Anna Marina)
- The Mischievous Twins (Mrs. Naylor)
- The Brave Fighter of Sun Fighbird (Katchan's Mother)
- Future GPX Cyber Formula (Junko Kazami)
- Matchless Raijin-Oh (Aiko Shimada)
- Oniisama E... (Aya Misaki's Mother)

==== 1992 ====
- The Bush Baby (Raiza)
- Space Oz no Bōken (Uncle Emily, Hagi)
- Kobo-chan (Akiko)
- Mikan Enikki (Mrs. Yokota)

==== 1993 ====
- Yūsha Tokkyū Might Gaine (Aunt)
- Ocean Waves (Taku's Mother)
- Mukamuka Paradise (Dosu Dosu)

==== 1994 ====
- Akazukin Cha Cha (Queen)
- Mobile Fighter G Gundam (Mikino Kasshu)

==== 1995 ====
- Romeo and the Black Brothers (Cristina)
- Nurse Angel Ririka SOS (Principal)
- Saint Tail (Ninomiya's Mother)

==== 1996 ====
- Meiken Lassie (Annie Monaghan)
- Kodomo no Omocha (Sumire Ando)

==== 1997 ====
- Hare Tokidoki Buta (Uncle Binbinba)
- Fortune Quest L (Mother, Linda White)

==== 1998 ====
- Trigun (Joshua)
- Legend of Basara (Makoto's Mother)
- Lost Universe (Alice)
- His and Her Circumstances (Arima's aunt, mother)
- Senki Iris Rainbow (Karen)
- Ojarumaru (Mariko Jumonji)

==== 1999 ====
- Kakyūsei (female customer (ep 6))
- Weekly Story Land (Narrator)

==== 2000 ====
- KAIKAN Phrase (Yuki's Mother)
- Inspector Fabre (Ricard)
- Invincible King Tri-Zenon (Ryōko Uryū)

==== 2001 ====
- Noir (Marguerite)
- Figure 17 (Rin Ibaragi)
- Shaman King (Tao Ran)

==== 2002 ====
- The Twelve Kingdoms (Ritsuko Nakajima)
- Getbackers (Ban's Mother)

==== 2003 ====
- Astro Boy: Mighty Atom (Yunomu)
- Happy Lesson Advanced (???)

==== 2004 ====
- Daphne in the Brilliant Blue (Helena Nakayashiki)
- Fafner in the Azure (Chisato Kodate)
- Atashin'chi (Fortune Teller)
- Maria Watches Over Us Season 2: Printemps (Yumi's mother)
- Agatha Christie no Meitantei Poirot to Marple (Mrs. Barnard)

==== 2005 ====
- Kaiketsu Zorori (Grandma)
- Canvas 2 – Niji Iro no Sketch (Yukiko Housen)
- Kotenkotenko (Suno-san)

==== 2006 ====
- Wan Wan Serebu Soreyuke! Tetsunoshin (Chiyo)
- Yomigaeru Sora – RESCUE WINGS - (Ryouko Shaura)
- Ouran High School Host Club (Lady)
- The Third: The Girl with the Blue Eye (Female president)
- Yakeato no, Okashi no Ki (Taichi's Mother)
- Death Note (Sachiko Yagami)

==== 2007 ====
- Gakuen Utopia Manabi Straight! (Gakuenchou)
- Darker than Black (Berta)
- Futatsu no Kurumi (Tomiko)

==== 2008 ====
- Noramimi (Shigeru's Mother)
- Allison & Lillia (Ema)
- Kiku-chan to Ōkami (Narration)

==== 2009 ====
- Maria Watches Over Us 4th Season (Miki Fukuzawa)
- Fullmetal Alchemist: Brotherhood (Mrs. Bradley)

==== 2011 ====
- Battle Girls – Time Paradox (Chief Priest)
- Twin Angel: Twinkle Paradise (Sakie Kannazuki)
- No. 6 (Aunt)
- Chihayafuru (Karuta Reader)

==== 2012 ====
- Danball Senki W (Madame Bullhorn)

==== 2019 ====
- Yo-kai Watch! (Koma Kaa-chan)

==== 2023 ====
- Soaring Sky! Pretty Cure (Satsuko)

=== OVA ===
- Lunn Flies into the Wind) (1985) (Girlfriend)
- Laughing Target (1987) (Satomi's Mother)
- Assemble Insert (1989) (Okami)
- Eguchi Hisashi no Kotobuki Goro Show (1991) (Kirishima's Wife, Refined Mother)
- Kiss wa Me ni shite (1993) (Ibuki's mother)

=== Movies ===
- Bio Booster Armor Guyver (1986) as Mother
- Memories (1995)
- Marco: 3000 Leagues in Search of Mother (1999) as Gina Grandmother
- Pokémon: Zoroark: Master of Illusions (2010) as Tomo

=== Video games ===
- Langrisser: Hikari no Matsuei (1993) as Jessica
- Langrisser III (1996) as Jessica
- Final Fantasy VII Remake (2020) as Jessie's Mother

=== Dubbing ===
==== Live-action ====
- Beethoven (Brie Wilson (Patricia Heaton))
- Clear and Present Danger (Moira Wolfson (Ann Magnuson))
- College Road Trip (Michelle Porter (Kym Whitley))
- The Crow (Darla Mohr (Anna Thomson))
- Full House (Clare)
- Harry Potter (Petunia Dursley (Fiona Shaw))
- Hocus Pocus (Mary Sanderson (Kathy Najimy))
- Mighty Morphin Power Rangers (Ms. Appleby)
- Painted Faces (Ching (Cheng Pei-pei))
- The Purple Rose of Cairo (Emma (Dianne Wiest), Kitty Haynes (Karen Akers))
- Snake Eyes (Julia Costello (Carla Gugino))
- Ultraman: The Ultimate Hero (Mitchell's neighbors, Wittigher's Assistant)

==== Animation ====
- Cats Don't Dance (Tilly)
- Chicken Run (Babs)
- Corpse Bride (Nell Van Dort)
- The Croods (Ugga Crood)
- The Croods: A New Age (Ugga Crood)
- Happy Feet (Ms. Viola)
- Happy Feet Two (Ms. Viola)
- Inside Out (Mother's Sadness)
- Peppa Pig (George Pig)
- Shrek 2 (Fairy Godmother)
- WALL-E (Mary)

=== CD Drama ===
- Fushigi Yugi: Genbu Kaiten (Polate, Narration)
