= Shinobu Adachi =

Japanese actress (born 1958)

- 安達 忍
- Born: April 7, 1958 (age 68); Tokyo, Japan
- Occupations: Actress; voice actress; narrator
- Years active: 1980–present
- Agent: Mouvement
- Website: Official profile

Shinobu Adachi (安達 忍, Adachi Shinobu; born April 7, 1958) is a Japanese actress, voice actress and narrator from Tokyo, Japan affiliated with the agency Mouvement.

== Filmography ==
=== Television animation ===
- The Wonderful Adventures of Nils (1980) – Gacho
- Maicching Machiko-sensei (1981) – Hiromi
- Urusei Yatsura (1981)
- Yume no Hoshi no Button Nose (1985) – Prince Flower
- Uchuusen Sagittarius (1986)
- Ai Shōjo Porianna Monogatar (1986) – Mary
- Bug tte Honey (1986) – Midori
- Fight! Kickers (1986) – Hideo Obata
- Ahiru no Quack (1989)
- Madō King Granzort (1989) – Rabi
- Patlabor The Mobile Police (1989) – Tamiko Shinshi
- Madō King Granzort: Non-Stop Rabi (1990 special) – Rabi
- Trapp Ikka Monogatari (1991) – Rupert
- Future GPX Cyber Formula (1991) – Miki Jonouchi, Young Hayato
- Oniisama E... (1991) – "Mona Lisa no Kimi" Komazawa
- Watashi to Watashi: Futari no Lotte (1991) – Linne Kogel
- Space Oz no Bouken (1992) – Toma
- Calimero (1992) – Calimero
- Miracle Girls (1993) – Yuuhei (ep 14)
- Mobile Suit Victory Gundam (1993) – Kate Bush
- Iron Leaguer (1993) – Watt
- Shima Shima Tora no Shimajirō (1993) – Paisley, Renge Midorihara
- Sailor Moon S (1994) – U Henshu (ep 113)
- Huckleberry Finn Monogatari (1994) – Tom
- Blue Seed (1994) – Jun
- Wedding Peach (1995) – Nocturne
- Bakusou Kyoudai Let's & Go (1996) – Yoshie Seiba
- Ie Naki Ko Remi (1996-1997) – Mattia, Pierre (ep 3)
- Bakusou Kyoudai Let's & Go WGP (1997) – Michael, Yoshie Seiba
- Tenchi in Tokyo (1997) – Masayo Manuketa
- AWOL - Absent WithOut Leave (1998) – Amanda
- Fancy Lala (1998) – Pigu, Saburo Furuhata (ep 21)
- Nintama Rantaro (2004) – Mikiemon Tamura
- Tweeny Witches (2004) – Menow (Sheila's Mother)
- Jagainu-kun (2004) – Jagainu
- Little Witch Academia (2017) – Daryl Cavendish

=== Theatrical animation ===
- Urusei Yatsura: Lum The Forever (1986)
- The Foxes of Chironup Island (1987) – Koro
- Bug tte Honey: Megaromu Shoujo Ma 4622 (1987) – Midori
- Mobile Suit Gundam: Char's Counterattack (1988) – Kayra Su
- Patlabor 2: The Movie (1993) – Tamiko Shinshi
- Space Travelers (2000) – Tanner

=== Original video animation (OVA) ===
- Madō King Granzort: The Final Magical Battle (1990) – Rabi
- Hakkenden: Legend of the Dog Warriors (1990) – Nabiki
- Madō King Granzort: Bōken-hen (1992) – Rabi
- Future GPX Cyber Formula 11 (1992) – Miki Jonouchi
- New Cutey Honey (1994) – Scorpion (ep 7)
- Future GPX Cyber Formula Zero (1994) – Miki Jounouchi
- Future GPX Cyber Formula: Early Days Renewal (1996) – Miki Jonouchi
- Future GPX Cyber Formula Saga (1996) – Miki Jyonouchi
- Pendant (1997) – Kenta (ep 3; + unlisted credits)

=== Video games ===
- Bakusou Kyoudai Let's & Go!! Eternal Wings (????) – Michael
- Kingdom Hearts Birth by Sleep (????) – Drizella
- Spyro x Sparx: Tondemo Tours (2000) – Elora

=== Tokusatsu ===
- Chōriki Sentai Ohranger (1995) – Butler Kocha
- Chōriki Sentai Ohranger Movie (1995) – Butler Kocha
- Juken Sentai Gekiranger (2007) – Five Venom Fist Confrontation Beast Scorpion-Fist Sorisa

=== Dubbing ===
==== Live-action ====
- Jennifer Aniston
  - Friends – Rachel Green
  - The Good Girl – Justine Last
  - Bruce Almighty – Grace Connelly
  - Along Came Polly – Polly Prince
  - The Break-Up – Brooke Meyers
  - Friends with Money – Olivia
  - Love Happens – Eloise
  - The Bounty Hunter – Nicole Hurley
  - The Switch – Kassie Larson
  - Just Go with It – Katherine Murphy
  - Wanderlust – Linda Gergnblatt
  - We're the Millers – Rose O'Reilly
  - Mother's Day – Sandy Newhouse
- Addams Family Values – Heather (Cynthia Nixon)
- American Splendor – Joyce Brabner (Hope Davis)
- Apollo 13 (1999 NTV edition) – Mary (Tracy Reiner)
- Bedazzled – Carol (Miriam Shor)
- Beverly Hills, 90210 – Donna Martin (Tori Spelling)
- BH90210 – Tori Spelling/Donna Martin
- Big Daddy – Layla Maloney (Joey Lauren Adams)
- Bill & Ted's Bogus Journey – Joanna (Sarah Trigger)
- Born on the Fourth of July (VHS edition) – Jamie Wilson (Lili Taylor)
- Bullets Over Broadway – Olive Neal (Jennifer Tilly)
- Child's Play 2 – Kyle (Christine Elise)
- The Count – Miss Moneybags (Edna Purviance)
- Desperate Housewives – Edie Britt (Nicollette Sheridan)
- Diary of a Wimpy Kid series – Susan Heffley (Rachael Harris)
- ER – Chloe Lewis (Kathleen Wilhoite)
- Escape from L.A. – Taslima (Valeria Golino)
- The Firm – Tamara "Tammy" Hemphill (Holly Hunter)
- Fun with Dick and Jane – Jane Harper (Téa Leoni)
- Ghostbusters – Janine Melnitz (Annie Potts)
- Ghostbusters II – Janine Melnitz (Annie Potts)
- Ghostbusters: Afterlife – Janine Melnitz (Annie Potts)
- Ghostbusters: Frozen Empire – Janine Melnitz (Annie Potts)
- La Vie en rose – Édith Piaf (Marion Cotillard)
- Marry Me – Parker Debbs (Sarah Silverman)
- A Minecraft Movie – Vice Principal Marlene (Jennifer Coolidge)
- Mother, May I Sleep with Danger? – Julie Lewisohn (Tori Spelling)
- Nemesis – Max Impact
- The Parent Trap – Elizabeth "Liz" James (Natasha Richardson)
- Pee-wee's Big Adventure – Dottie (E. G. Daily)
- Pink Cadillac – Lou Ann McGuinn (Bernadette Peters)
- Pretty in Pink – Iona (Annie Potts)
- Pulp Fiction – Honey Bunny (Amanda Plummer)
- Runaway Bride – Peggy Flemming (Joan Cusack)
- Scrooged – The Ghost of Christmas Present (Carol Kane)
- Seed of Chucky – Tiffany Valentine / Jennifer Tilly
- A Series of Unfortunate Events – Justice Strauss (Joan Cusack)
- Thomas and the Magic Railroad – Stacy Jones (Didi Conn)
- Twin Peaks (1990–91) – Lucy Moran (Kimmy Robertson)
- Twin Peaks (2017) – Lucy Brennan (Kimmy Robertson)
- The Vagabond – Gypsy Drudge (Edna Purviance)
- Waitress – Becky (Cheryl Hines)
- Will & Grace – Karen Walker (Megan Mullally)

==== Animation ====
- Cinderella II: Dreams Come True – Drizella Tremaine
- Cinderella III: A Twist in Time – Drizella Tremaine
- Kid vs. Kat – Phoebe
- Rex the Runt – Wendy
- The Simpsons – Martin Prince, Todd Flanders
- Sitting Ducks – Bev
- W.I.T.C.H. – Yan Lin
- X-Men (TV Tokyo edition) – Jean Grey
