= Ayumi Kida =

Japanese voice actress (born 1966)

Ayumi Kida (喜田 あゆ美, Kida Ayumi; born June 7, 1966) is a Japanese voice actress. Her voice-over credits include the Japanese dub voices of Dexter in Dexter's Laboratory, Swayzak from Toonami, and Dib Membrane in Invader Zim.

== Notable roles ==
1994

- Omakase Scrappers as Akira
- Yamato Takeru as Kiriomi

1995

- El Hazard: The Wanderers as Crayna-Crayna
- Fushigi Yûgi as Young Hotohori
- Magical Girl Pretty Sammy as Gunman Girl (ep. 10)

1998

- Bakusō Kyōdai Let's & Go!! MAX as Zen Kusanagi
- Cowboy Bebop as Cain
- El Hazard: The Alternative World as Klenna Klenna (ep. 15)

1999

- Detective Conan as Takada Tomohiro (ep. 149)

2002

- Hanada Shōnen Shi as Machida-sensei

2003

- Midnight Horror School as Juno; Mr. X

2006

- Kiba as Guljef

=== Films ===
- Porco Rosso (1992)
- Ultra Nyan: Hoshizora Kara Maiorita Fushigi Neko as Mamoru (1997)

=== Video games ===
- Power Stone 2 as Pete (2000)
- Kingdom Hearts Birth by Sleep as Anastasia (2010)

=== Dubbing roles ===
==== Live-action ====
- Apollo 13 as Mary (Tracy Reiner)
- The Bone Collector (2002 TV Asahi edition) as Nurse Thelma (Queen Latifah)
- The Butler as Gloria Gaines (Oprah Winfrey)
- Deception as Detective Russo (LisaGay Hamilton)
- Die Hard with a Vengeance as Officer Jane
- Double Jeopardy as Evelyn Lake (Davenia McFadden)
- Doubt as Mrs. Miller (Viola Davis)
- The Fast and the Furious as Letty Ortiz (Michelle Rodriguez)
- Forrest Gump as Louise (Margo Moorer)
- The Help as Aibileen Clark (Viola Davis)
- One Battle After Another as Deanda (Regina Hall)
- Power Rangers Lost Galaxy as Hexuba
- Reality Bites as Vickie Miner (Janeane Garofalo)
- Scary Movie (2026) as Brenda Meeks (Regina Hall)
- Sphere as Alice "Teeny" Fletcher (Queen Latifah)

==== Animation ====
- Cinderella as Anastasia
- Cybersix as Julian
- Dexter's Laboratory as Dexter
- Invader Zim as Dib Membrane
- Planes: Fire & Rescue as Dynamite
- SWAT Kats: The Radical Squadron as Lil' Old Woman
- Star Wars: Ewoks as Teebo
- Toonami: Trapped in Hyperspace as Swayzak
