= Mashin Hero Wataru =

Japanese anime television series

魔神英雄伝ワタル (Mashin Eiyūden Wataru)
- Created by: Hajime Yatate
- Anime television series
- Directed by: Shūji Iuchi
- Produced by: Takayuki Yoshii; Yuko Sagawa; Hibiki Ito
- Written by: Takao Koyama
- Music by: Jun'ichi Kanezaki; Satoshi Kadokura
- Studio: Sunrise
- Original network: NNS (NTV)
- Original run: April 15, 1988 – March 31, 1989
- Episodes: 45
- Original video animation

Genuine Mashin Hero Wataru
- Directed by: Yutaka Kagawa; Shūji Iuchi
- Written by: Takao Koyama
- Music by: Kohei Tanaka
- Studio: Sunrise
- Released: August 5, 1989 – September 5, 1989
- Episodes: 2
- Anime television series

Mashin Hero Wataru 2
- Directed by: Shuji Iuchi
- Produced by: Takayuki Yoshii; Yuko Sagawa; Hibiki Ito
- Written by: Takao Koyama; Yoshimasa Takahashi
- Music by: Hayato Kanbayashi
- Studio: Sunrise
- Original network: NNS (NTV)
- Original run: March 3, 1990 – March 8, 1991
- Episodes: 46
- Original video animation

Mashin Hero Wataru: A Story At An Endless Time
- Directed by: Shūji Iuchi
- Written by: Shūji Iuchi
- Music by: Michiru Ōshima
- Studio: Sunrise
- Released: October 1, 1993 – February 1, 1994
- Episodes: 3
- Anime television series

Super Mashin Hero Wataru
- Directed by: Shūji Iuchi
- Music by: Tomoyuki Asakawa; Toshihiko Sahashi
- Studio: Sunrise
- Original network: TXN (TV Tokyo)
- Original run: October 2, 1997 – September 24, 1998
- Episodes: 51
- Original net animation

Mashin Hero Wataru: The Seven Spirits of Ryujinmaru
- Directed by: Hiroshi Kōjina
- Studio: Sunrise
- Released: April 10, 2020 – November 20, 2020
- Episodes: 9
- Manga
- Illustrated by: Hideaki Fujii
- Published by: Shogakukan
- Magazine: Corocoro Aniki
- Original run: July 15, 2020 – present
- Related works
- Mashin Creator Wataru

Mashin Hero Wataru (Japanese: 魔神英雄伝ワタル, Hepburn: Mashin Eiyūden Wataru; lit. 'Magic God Hero Legend Wataru') is a mecha multimedia franchise originally created by Sunrise and Red Company. The first series aired on April 15, 1988, replacing the 17:00–17:30 timeslot used for Transformers: The Headmasters. Sunrise credited "Hajime Yatate" for the storyline and Shūji Iuchi directed the series. The series uses elements from both Chinese and Japanese mythology, in terms of themes and settings.

== Story ==
The story is about a 9-year-old boy named Wataru Ikusabe (戦部 ワタル, Ikusabe Wataru) who is magically transported to a magical realm by a mystical dragon named Ryujinmaru (龍神丸, Dragon God Round) - this magical realm is known as Soukaizan (創界山, Sōkaizan), which he is supposed to save from an evil, magical and demonic ruler.

The series incorporates many elements of contemporary RPG video games including dungeon levels and quests for magical objects. Soukaizan itself is represented as a series of tiered platforms each floating above the one beneath it in a rough shape of a pyramid. In order to progress to the next tier where he will meet the series' ultimate magical villain, the show's heroes must first complete some task on the tiers beneath the last one. In addition to completing these quests, he has to defeat the ruler of each level along with his many henchmen. Each level he completes, he rejuvenates one color of the gray rainbow over Soukaizan.

In his quest to save the magical realm, Wataru manages to transform a clay sculpture into a somewhat autonomous and small along with magical Super Robot. He also befriends many of the Soukaizan natives, and forms some very strong bonds of friendship. The term "Sou-kai-zan" can be broken down to its three parts: "Sou" (creation), "Kai" (realm, space, world, or universe), and "Zan" (hill or mountain), representing the pyramid shape of the magical world.

== Cast ==
- Mayumi Tanaka as Wataru Ikusabe (戦部 ワタル Ikusabe Wataru) (In Keith Courage in Alpha Zones, he is known as Keith Courage)
- Megumi Hayashibara as Himiko Shinobibe (忍部 ヒミコ Shinobibe Himiko) (In Keith Courage in Alpha Zones, she is known as Nurse Nancy)
- Tomomichi Nishimura as Shibaraku Tsurugibe (剣部 シバラク Tsurugibe Shibaraku) (In Keith Courage in Alpha Zones, he is known as the Weapons Master)
- Koichi Yamadera as Kurama Wataribe (渡部 クラマ Wataribe Kurama)
- Kenichi Ogata as Genryūsai Shinobibe (忍部 幻龍斎 Shinobibe Genryūsai)
- Tesshō Genda as Ryūjinmaru
- Kazue Ikura as Toraoh (虎王 Toraō)
- Urara Takano as Umihiko (海火子)

== Episode list ==
No.	Title	Ref.
1	"The Savior Is A Fourth Grader!"	
During a stormy night, a dragon flies across the night sky sending a pearl down to a boy named Wataru. At school, Wataru accepts a challenge in school to make the best robot out of clay during art class. On his way home while crossing the dragon lake, a dragon appears and teleports him to a whole new world. He awakes in this world to discover that he is the legendary savior.
12	TBA	
Wataru and gang encounter a city built on a hot plate. They are able to cook eggs and meat on the road. While there, they discover that the boss of the city is a clean freak named Mariannette. She regularly brings up the temperature of the city to sanitize everything. Hikaru rides a kite and slams into her castle. Not knowing her identity, Mariannette befriends her and they play many games. Wataru eventually gets to the castle and is attacked on site due to the amount of dirt he has brought in. Mariannette chases the group with her flamethrower and they run into Kurama. After being tricked by Kurama, Wataru finds himself face to face with Mariannette's Mashin. It looks like a hockey player and shoots pucks out of its shield. After an intense battle, Ryujinmaru prevails by cutting her Mashin in half. The town is returned to normal and Mariannette's Nanny sends them off to another city to retrieve a legendary sword.
13	TBA	
Wataru and his gang find themselves in a city run by a very large wrestler. He has taken over the city by forcing people to manufacture and drink his magma drink. It is a very spicy drink causing anyone to drink it to turn red. Coincidentally, Hikaru is not affected by it at all. Amused by her resistance, she is taken hostage and Wataru is forced to enter the wrestling ring to challenge him. Wataru boasts that he finished first in wrestling in his class, but is unable to do anything to the wrestler. Eventually it is discovered that the wrestler is unable to do basic math. Wataru shoots off a series of multiplication questions confusing the wrestler allowing Wataru to knock him out of the ring. He returns with his wrestler inspired Mashin. The Mashin is defeated by Ryujinmaru's sword.
14	"Sage Power"	
Dagedar, the ruler of the city is warned by Souye Souye to not let Wataru progress any further. Dagedar is a moustached man wearing American football gear. Meanwhile, Shibaraku has figured out a way to beat the hot floor by wearing stone sandals. While traveling through a narrow pass they are ambushed by three American football themed Mashins. They are saved by Himiko when she transforms into a slot machine and releases small balls causing the two Mashins to slip and fall. Kurama sees this and plants a fake sign pointing to the legendary sword and shield. Before he goes through with this plans though, Wataru, Himiko and Shibaraku catch up to him. They journey together to the first hill and discover it to be a full sized football stadium. There they are ambushed by even more football themed Mashins. They are defeated by Ryujinmaru's fire dragon fist and dragon sword. The sage of the sword and shield is released from his prison, and informs the group that the permafrost sword and scorching heat shield are what keeps the temperatures in check, without it the third level will be hot as it currently is. Dokudar had switched the two around. Kurama reveals the location of Souye Souye and Wataru leaves with Ryujinmaru thinking that Souye Souye has the sword. After intimidating Kurama, Shibaraku learns that the sword is at the fourth level and thus Wataru will never find it. Wataru runs into Souye Souye piloting his Mashin. It is a knight with orange hair dressed in golden armor. Ryujinmaru teaches Wataru a new a move: Flying Dragon Fist, in which blue chains shoot out from Ryujinmaru's torso like arrows. With Souye Souye's Mashin down and out, the sage of the sword and shield sacrifices himself to send Ryujinmaru and Wataru to the 4th level. The episode ends with Wataru and Ryujinmaru passed out in the snow.
15	"Wake Up Fire Dragon!"	
For revealing the location of the sword, Kurama is viewed as a traitor and is kidnapped and tortured by Souze Souze. Doakudar even sends three save brothers to participate. They arrive with their three custom Mashins. On the 4th level, Wataru rescues a girl named Yuki from a Mashin that was chasing her. Yuki brings Wataru back to her town Takasen. All the villagers are frozen except for her as she possesses the fire dragon's scale. She reveals that Duoheki is the keeper of the town. Shibaraku and Hikaru rescue Kurama from his prison, but the three lords smile as they watch them escaping. Meanwhile, Wataru frees the fire dragon from its snowy curse using the scale. The fire dragon restores Ryujinmaru and they are able to defeat Duoheki and his Mashin. The fire dragon points them to Yei Yei Valley and Yuki joins Wataru on his quest.
16	"The Legend of Light"	
While traveling through the snow, Wataru and Yuki encounter another sage. He tells them the legend of Yasimus and Hunala, the deities of the seasons. With the help of Simon a mammoth they are able to defeat Duoheki and his mashin. Meanwhile, Kurama imprisons both Shibaraku and Hikaru in a burning house intending to kill them. Kurama flies away with a heavy heart as he feels a genuine friendship with them and is only doing so in fear of his life.
17	"Permafrost Sword can't be pulled out"	
With the failure of Duoheki, Dr. Gasmon takes the stage and tries to trick Wataru using 3D imagery to draw him to a cliff. He is unable to stop Wataru and Yuki from reaching Hunala, and his mashin is defeated. Unfortunately, not even Ryujinmaru's attacks can melt the ice surrounding Hunalu's statue. They discover that the mirror of truth can do it, but right before Wataru gets the sword, Lord Cruelty shows him that Shibaraku and Hikaru will be burnt to death if he takes it.
18	"It's hot! It's hot! Let's fly away!"	
Souya Souya decides to burn the two hostages anyway, but Kurama has a change of heart and rescues the two. Souya Souya pursues them with his Mashin and defeats Kurama's Mashin. At the same time, Yuki has convinced the statue of Hunala to give Wataru the permafrost sword. She also gives him a crystalline teardrop and opens a portal to the 3rd level for Ryujinmaru to enter. They reach the third level just in time to prevent Souya Souya from killing everyone. Wataru uses the permafrost sword to enhance Ryujinmaru's sword and defeats Souya Souya. With Kurama's treachery exposed, Shibaraku wants to execute him. In the middle of the sword swing Shirabuki sees Kurama crying from his heart and gently taps him with the back of the sword declaring "the old Kurama is dead", and they leave Kurama as they run to Yasimus's statue. However, even with the sword in place, level 3 is still burning. Kurama flies in and reveals that the dragon's eye on the shield also needs to be replaced. On a hunch, Wataru uses Hunala's teardrop, and all is restored. Kurama realizes he has found true friends and the four run off into the sunset ready for the next level.
19	"Ryujinmaru is flying!"	
Yukai Dolunro, a master of disguise has been sent to assassinate Wataru by transforming into Yuki. Kurama however finds the real Yuki and by revealing their foot injuries (The real one has long since healed) the party is able to figure out who the real Yuki is. Yukai Dolunro goes back to his original form (Noh Performer theme) and summons his Mashin, in the form of a medieval knight carrying a lance. Dr Gasmon makes a return appearance and the two of them take on Ryujinmaru. Soujinmaru, Kurama's mashin "combines" with Ryujinmaru to allow him to fly. With their teamwork, they are able to defeat the pair.
20	"Ryujinmaru is flying in Yei Yei temple"	
Dr Gasmon launches one final attack against the party with his remote controlled mashins only to fall at the hands of Shibaraku. As Wataru is about to put the sword back in Hunala's hands, the savage brothers make an appearance to stop them. After a being on the losing end of a melee, Simon saves Wataru/Shibaraku/Kurama by nearly squashing Lord Cruelty. The savage brothers respond by summoning their mashins, which form into a giant Mashin named Amalgamator. Ryujinmaru and Wataru are only able to defeat them by using the sword of fire and a lot of energy. Ryujinmaru is severely weakened in the process. Wataru quickly places the sword back into Hunala's hands but is once again stopped by Lord Cruelty. However, Hunala and Yasimus send him away via magic. All is restored to level 4, unfortunately due to the massive amount of power used, Ryujinmaru passes away. Hunalu reveals that on level 5 there are waters of life that can bring back someone who has died for a righteous cause.
21	"The arrival of the tiger prince"	
Wataru and party land in the 5th level and discover it to be a polluted wasteland, where even shellfish in the lakes have mutated to gigantic proportions. The level is ruled by Lord Black Smoke and the city they have found themselves in is ruled Cydorona by who runs a factory mass producing helicopter-like mashins. Wataru and company find themselves in trouble after rescuing a boy from getting executed. His crime was taking care of a caterpillar in a jar. Cydorona summons his crane/bulldozer themed mashin Buruki and defeats bouth Zanjinmaru and Soujinmaru with ease. Wataru tricks Cydorona by making Cydorona crash in a vat, causing a large explosion leveling the whole factory. The caterpillar finally breaks out of its cocoon and a butterfly breaks forth. Wataru deduces that the butterfly will lead them to the Sago jungle since there is no other place where it could have been picked up. Meanwhile, the tiger prince escapes the palace and pilots his tiger based mashin, Jakoumaru heading for the lower levels.
22	"Must see! The birth of Ryujinmaru!"	
While searching for the waters of life, Hikaru runs into the tiger prince Toraoh. After playing a game of tag, Toraoh makes her his bride, but has to run off when the search party for him flies overhead. The waters of life happen to only be extracted from flowers that haven't bloomed in a while due to lack of sunlight. Soujinmaru attempts to break through the clouds to have a few rays shine downwards but instead runs into Cydorona and his Buruki 2. Guruman sacrifices himself to give Wataru enough time to resurrect Ryujinmaru. Ryujinmaru re-materializes and suggests that he can bond with the soul of Soujinmaru to become an even stronger mashin, Ryuomaru. With the new Ryuomaru, Buruki 2 is defeated easily. Kurama dies from his wounds but the waters of life save him and transform him back into a human. He decides to take the waters of life back to his village.
23	"Finally! Using Genjinmaru"	
Wataru and gang find themselves in orchid valley run by Guseleya and a ship themed mashin. Himiko succumbs to a vapor spitting plant and has a very high fever. They are sent to retrieve the Banjin plant from Banjin valley.
24	"Get Lost! Wataru's GENJIN race"	
Wataru encounters a motorcycle type mashin and he is challenged to a race.
25	"The big adventure"	
A flying factory run by husband and wife team terrorizes tiny people. It's up to Wataru and his friends to save them.
26	"Where's green dragon?"	
Lord Black Smoke makes an appearance and battles Wataru in dragon city.
27	"What a good seed?"	
Level 5 is restored.

== Interpretations ==
The first section of the title's kanji is a pun: the super-deformed mecha of the series are called "Magic Gods" (Kanji: 魔神, Romaji: mashin) - while written with the kanji for "magic" being shortened from "魔法" (mahō) to "魔" (ma) and "god" (神, shin) ("Shin" is the onyomi reading of this kanji while the kunyomi is "kami"), "mashin" is also the katakana spelling of English loanword "machine" (マシン, mashin). The kanji for "legend", 伝説 (densetsu) is shortened to "伝" (den) before being written alongside "hero" (英雄 Eiyū). A freer translation of the title would be "Legend of the Spirit Wataru."

Wataru and his friends Shibaraku and Himiko each represent different elements of ancient Japan: Wataru with his magatama and association with dragons represents the pre-Yamato Watari clan. Shibaraku represents samurai. Himiko represents ninja.

== Cultural impact ==
The anime series was a huge hit in Japan, later being imported into Taiwan, Mainland China, South Korea, France, Monaco and Hong Kong (the latter was shown on TVB Jade). Chinese translations were provided. The show became one of the most famous Japanese anime shows in China during the mid-1990s.

== Spin-offs ==
The franchise has spawned three TV series (Mashin Hero Wataru, Mashin Hero Wataru 2, Super Mashin Hero Wataru), four radio shows, five OVAs, five novels, five video games, and assorted other merchandise. One of the video games was released for the PC Engine, and would become the original pack-in game in the United States as Keith Courage in Alpha Zones when localized on the TurboGrafx-16.

A sequel anime, Mashin Hero Wataru: The Seven Spirits of Ryujinmaru, was released online on April 10, 2020. On April 24, 2020, it was announced that the anime would be on a hiatus due to the COVID-19 pandemic. On June 12, 2020, it was announced the anime would resume on June 19, 2020.

Wataru's success prompted Bandai to copy the super-deformed mecha and multi-tiered world concepts in a science fiction setting with Sunrise's 1989 Madö King Granzört TV series.

A manga adaptation drawn by Hideaki Fujii began serialization in Shogakukan's Corocoro Aniki manga magazine in July 2020.

A new anime television series, titled Mashin Creator Wataru (Japanese: 魔神創造伝ワタル, Hepburn: Mashin Sōzōden Wataru; lit. 'Magic God Creation Legend Wataru'), was announced by Bandai Namco Filmworks on January 13, 2024. The series was produced by Bandai Namco Pictures and was directed by Yumi Kamakura. Yoichi Kato wrote the scripts, Mayuko Nakano and Yoshinori Yumoto designed the characters, and Ryūichi Takada, Keiichi Hirokawa, Oliver Good, and Keita Inoue composed the music. The series premiered on January 12, 2025, on TV Tokyo and other TX Network affiliates. The opening theme song is "POP UP!" performed by lol and the ending theme song is "Pocket" performed by Fantastics from Exile Tribe. Medialink licensed the series in Asia-Pacific, with it streaming on their Ani-One Asia YouTube Channel on the same day as premiere in Japan.

== Music ==
Wataru

- Opening: "Step" by achi-achi
- Ending: "Achi-achi Adventure" by achi-achi

Wataru 2

- Opening 1: "Step by Step" by Yumiko Takahashi
- Ending 1: "Kimi ni Tomaranai - MY GIRL, MY LOVE" by Takahashi Yumiko
- Opening 2: "Fight" by Takahashi Yumiko
- Ending 2: "Niji no Kanata" by Takahashi Yumiko

Cho Mashin Hero Wataru

- Opening 1: "Hitotsu no Hāto de" (ひとつのハートで; lit. "With One Heart") by Hitomi Mieno
- Ending 1: "BOYS BE AMBITIOUS" by Hitomi Mieno
- Opening 2: "POWER OF DREAM" by Hitomi Mieno
- Ending 2: "Ganbatte" by Hitomi Mieno
