= Shūji Iuchi =

Japanese anime director (1950–2016)

- Born: Hideji Iuchi; September 15, 1950; Kanagawa Prefecture Japan
- Died: December 15, 2016 (aged 66)
- Occupation: Director
- Notable work: Mashin Hero Wataru; Crush Gear Turbo; Yamato Takeru

Shūji Iuchi (井内 秀治, Iuchi Shūji) (September 15, 1950 – December 15, 2016) was a director of anime series. Iuchi directed Crush Gear Turbo, Mashin Hero Wataru, Yamato Takeru and several other series.

== Director ==
=== Television ===
- chief/series director denoted in bold
- Gaiking (1976)
- Star of the Giants (1977)
- Cho Super Car Gattaiger (1977)
- Shin Ace o Nerae! (1978)
- Galaxy Express 999 (1978-1981)
- The Monster Kid (1980-1982)
- Queen Millennia (1981)
- Ninjaman Ippei (1982)
- Aura Battler Dunbine (1983-1984)
- Lady Georgie (1983-1984)
- God Mazinger (1984)
- Heavy Metal L-Gaim (1984-1985)
- Mobile Suit Zeta Gundam (1985-1986)
- Onegai! Samia-don (1985-1986)
- Pro Golfer Saru (1985-1988)
- Honey Bee in Toycomland (1986-1987)
- Metal Armor Dragonar (1987-1988)
- **Mashin Hero Wataru** (1988-1989)
- **Madö King Granzört** (1989-1990)
- **Mashin Hero Wataru 2** (1990-1991)
- **Mama wa Shōgaku 4 Nensei** (1992)
- **Yamato Takeru** (1994)
- Kuma no Putaro (1996)
- Shōnen Santa no Daibôken (1996)
- **Super Mashin Hero Wataru** (1997-1998)
- **Crush Gear Turbo** (2001-2003)
- Samurai 7 (2004)
- Onmyō Taisenki (2004-2005)
- Yakitate!! Japan (2004-2006)
- Speed Grapher (2005)
- Sgt. Frog (2005-2011)
- Dinosaur King (2007)
- Pretty Rhythm: Aurora Dream (2011-2012)
- Pretty Rhythm: Dear My Future (2012-2013)
- Pretty Rhythm: Rainbow Live (2013-2014)
- Gundam Build Fighters Try (2014-2015)
- Aikatsu! (2015)
- Jewelpet: Magical Change (2015)
- Rilu Rilu Fairilu ~Yousei no Door~ (2016)
- Flowering Heart (2016)
- Shōnen Maid (2016)
- Seisen Cerberus (2016)
- Shōnen Ashibe: GO! GO! Goma-chan (2016)

=== Film ===
- Galaxy Investigation 2100: Border Planet (1986)

=== OVAs ===
- Love Position - The Legend of Halley (1985)
- Mashin Hero Wataru: The Mashin Mountains (1989)
- Mashin Hero Wataru: The Story of the End of Time (1993-1994)
- Yamato Takeru: After War (1995)
- Kodocha (1997)
- The Galaxy Railways: A Letter from the Abandoned Planet (2007)

== Writer ==
- series head writer denoted in bold
- **Mashin Hero Wataru** (1988-1989)
- **Madö King Granzört** (1989-1990)
- **Mashin Hero Wataru 2** (1990-1991)
- Mama wa Shōgaku 4 Nensei (1992)
- Pretty Rhythm: Aurora Dream (2011-2012)
- Pretty Rhythm: Dear My Future (2012-2013)
- **Pretty Rhythm: Rainbow Live** (2013-2014)
