= The Wonderful Galaxy of Oz =

1992 anime television series

- Space Oz no Bōken

スペースオズの冒険 (Supēsu Ozu no Bōken)
- Genre: Adventure; Science fantasy
- Anime television series
- Directed by: Yoshiaki Okumura; Sōji Yoshikawa
- Produced by: Masashi Ogiwara; Matsuo Shimizu; Sachiko Kitazawa
- Music by: Ryuichi Katsumata
- Studio: E&G Films; Mu Animation Studio
- Original network: TXN (TV Tokyo)
- Original run: October 5, 1992 – April 5, 1993
- Episodes: 26

Space Oz no Bōken (Japanese: スペースオズの冒険, Hepburn: Supēsu Ozu no Bōken, lit. "Adventures of Space Oz") is an anime television series produced by Enoki Films and EZ Films with animation services by E&G Films and Mu Animation Studio that aired on TV Tokyo from October 5, 1992, to April 5, 1993. The series is a futuristic reimagining of L. Frank Baum's 1900 children's novel The Wonderful Wizard of Oz.

Since its original run, the series has not been rebroadcast in Japan or received any home media release. The English dub, The Wonderful Galaxy of Oz, was produced by Enoki Films USA in 1996 as a 75-minute direct-to-video film, using footage from the first and final few episodes. No proper material was available until 2019, when an Arabic dub of all 26 episodes was uploaded to YouTube.

== Premise ==
In the year 2060, eight-year-old Dorothy and her dog Toto are swept off their home planet of New Kansas in the aftermath of a catastrophic storm. They end up in the Galaxy of Oz, where an evil witch known as Gloomhilda once ruled; eventually driven out by renowned scientist Dr. Oz, she now has her sights on reclaiming the galaxy and has amassed an army in the outskirts of space. Her attack, however, is foiled due to Dorothy's unexpected arrival.

Knowing that Gloomhilda will return, Dr. Oz plans to use three magic crystals previously thought to have been lost for hundreds of years (the Crystals of Love, Wisdom, and Courage) to rid the galaxy of her wickedness. Under Dr. Oz's guidance, Dorothy and an assortment of "heroes" set out to scour the Galaxy in search of the crystals.

== Characters ==
=== Main characters ===
- Dorothy
- Toto
- Dr. Oz
- Plantman
- Chopper
- Lionman
- Prince Mosey

=== Villains ===
- Gloomhilda

== Music ==
- Opening Theme: To a Dream Adventure (夢の冒険へ, Yume no bôken he) by Minami Aoyama Girl Opera Company
- Ending Theme: Traveller of Light (光の旅人, Hikari no tabibito) by Yukari Morikawa

== Episodes ==
1. Dorothy Wanders Into The World of Oz (October 5, 1992)
2. The Surprising Secret of the King of Oz (October 12, 1992)
3. Mystery of the Crystal Empire (October 19, 1992)
4. The World's Cowardly Hero (October 26, 1992)
5. The Sleeping Beauty of Mangabu (November 2, 1992)
6. Chopper's Heart (November 9, 1992)
7. Entrust Fashion to Me! (November 16, 1992)
8. Baby-Sitter Crisis (November 16, 1992)
9. The Promise with Rockman Yabor (November 23, 1992)
10. Scrapia of Scrapper (November 30, 1992)
11. Grand Prix of Planet Car (December 7, 1992)
12. Dorothy's Santa Claus (December 14, 1992)
13. Chopper's Lover (December 25, 1992)
14. Escape from Planet Game (January 4, 1993)
15. Horror Birthday (January 11, 1993)
16. Planet Water Rescue Mission (January 18, 1993)
17. War of Toy Country (January 25, 1993)
18. Monster Panic (February 1, 1993)
19. Crowded Amusement Park (February 15, 1993)
20. The Planet Which Papa and I Defended (February 22, 1993)
21. Legend of Captain Garo (March 1, 1993)
22. Return to the Alherihit Hometown (March 8, 1993)
23. Film Star Glumilda (March 22, 1993)
24. The Reunion with Doctor Oz (April 2, 1993)
25. The Return of the Witch from the West (April 4, 1993)
26. Miracle of the Rainbow Crystal (April 4, 1993)

== Cast ==
=== Japanese cast ===
- Mariko Kouda - Dorothy
- Hiroshi Takemura - Chopper
- Noriko Kamimura - Gloomhilda
- Ai Satou - Emily Obasan, Hagi
- Eken Mine - Minister, Virtual President
- Hidetoshi Nakamura - Yabor
- Hirohiko Kakegawa - Bisuti
- Ichiro Murakoshi - Dr. Oz, Moji's Father
- Katsumi Suzuki - General of Oz, Toto
- Kazuhiko Kishino - Santa
- Kazuo Oka - Henry Ojisan, Paul's Father
- Kenichi Ono - Jill
- Kozo Shioya - Plante
- Kumiko Nishihara - Azuma
- Kumiko Takizawa - Queen
- Mahito Tsujimura - Rakudo
- Mami Matsui - Prince Mosey
- Mari Adachi - Koras Girl, Maid
- Mariko Ikegami - Nicholas
- Miki Narahashi - Misha's Mother
- Minoru Inaba - Alherihit
- Mitsuo Chida - Robot A
- Miyuki Matsushita - Rabbit, Sister
- Narumi Hidaka - Teddy Bear
- Natsumi Sakuma - Witch of the West
- Reiko Suzuki - Mother
- Rica Matsumoto - Baby Dinosaur
- Ryuuzou Ishino - Hunter, Radio Voice
- Satomi Koorogi - Misha
- Shinobu Adachi - Toma
- Shinpachi Tsuji - Baresuku, Captain, Hunter
- Shōzō Iizuka - Oz
- Takumi Yamazaki - Adjutant, Soldier A, Stag
- Toshiyuki Morikawa - Athletic
- Yasuo Muramatsu - King
- Yuri Amano - Princess Shera
- Yuri Shiratori - Lily
- Yuuichi Nagashima - Hunter

== See also ==
- The Wizard of Oz adaptations — other adaptations of The Wonderful Wizard of Oz
