= List of Dear Brother episodes =

Dear Brother (おにいさまへ..., Oniisama e...) is a Japanese anime series directed by Osamu Dezaki that aired on NHK-BS2 from July 14, 1991, to May 31, 1992. It was based on the 1975 manga of the same name by Riyoko Ikeda, about an ordinary girl that attends a prestigious girls' school.

Note that the English translations of these titles are unofficial. There were six OVAs produced as summary episodes, and they aired during the run of the anime.

The music of the series are in the enka genre. Bowls of Gold, Bowls of Silver (黄金の器 銀の器, Kin no Utsuwa, Gin no Utsuwa) by Satomi Takada is the opening theme, and the closing theme is Capricious Fairy (気まぐれな妖精, Kimagure na Yousei) by Takako Noda.

The series has been released on VHS, on laserdisc, and in a DVD box set in 2002.

No.	Title	Directed by	Written by	Original airdate
1	"The Magnificent Ones"; Transliteration: "Kareinaru Hitobito" (Japanese: 華麗なる人びと)	Yūsaku Saotome	Hideo Takayashiki	14 July 1991
Nanako has her first day at Seiran Academy. Rei helps her on the bus, and Nanako is instantly captivated by her charm. At school, Nanako meets Mariko, who immediately asks her to be her friend. The school listens to a speech by Fukiko about the Sorority and Nanako and Tomoko learn about The Magnificent Ones - Hana no Sainte-Juste (Rei), Kaoru-no-kimi (Kaoru), and Miya-sama (Fukiko).
2	"The Glass Slippers"; Transliteration: "GARASU no Kutsu" (Japanese: ガラスの靴)	Takuo Suzuki	Tomoko Konparu	21 July 1991
Mariko looks out for Nanako before class, and shoves Tomoko out of the way when she finds Nanako. Fukiko comes to Nanako's class and announces three Sorority candidates: Mariko, Kaoru, and Nanako. Kaoru declines her candidacy because she is opposed to the very existence of the Sorority, and makes the excuse that she declines due to her poor health. Aya makes a scene, calling Mariko and Nanako unqualified to be in the Sorority, revealing to Mariko that everyone had known all along that she was the daughter of a pornography writer. Aya goes to attack Mariko, but Kaoru stops her. Fukiko gives Nanako the invitation to the Sorority selection party, which clashes with her plans for Tomoko over the weekend.
3	"Nanako Is Disqualified?"; Transliteration: "Nanako Shikkaku?" (Japanese: 奈々子失格?)	Kazuo Nogami	Masami Mori	28 July 1991
An insulting note is posted about Nanako's candidacy for the Sorority on the school bulletin board, announcing to the entire school that Professor Misonoo is not really her father. Nanako considers not going to the party, but Tomoko talks her out of it. The day before the selection party, Aya, claiming to be Fukiko, phones and leaves a message for Nanako that the party has been changed to a later time.
4	"The Music Box"; Transliteration: "ORUGOORU" (Japanese: オルゴール)	Kazuya Miyazaki	Chifude Asakura	4 August 1991
Despite missing the selection party, Nanako has her interview, and humiliates herself. Mariko and Nanako realize that anyone could have left the message for Nanako, but Mariko correctly suspects Aya. Nanako and Mariko are notified of their selection to be in the Sorority, and Aya steps up her campaign of insults, revealing that Nanako's stepfather left his wife and child to marry Nanako's mother, who was a cocktail waitress.
5	"Thorns of Suspicion and Doubt"; Transliteration: "Giwaku no Toge" (Japanese: 疑惑の刺)	Tadaoki Uda	Hideo Takayashiki	11 August 1991
Nanako sees Kaoru stops Rei from taking some pills. Fukiko invites Rei into the Sorority House to help out with work, but intentionally injures her hand. Rei demands that Fukiko bandage her bloodied hand, but Fukiko refuses. Nanako treats Rei's wound, eliciting Fukiko's quiet anger. Nanako is officially inducted into the Sorority, but has a nightmare that night where Fukiko attacks her.
6	"Lost and Alone"; Transliteration: "Mayoi Michi, Hitori" (Japanese: 迷い道, ひとり)	Fumihiro Yoshimura	Tomoko Konparu	18 August 1991
The bullying continues: Nanako's gym uniform is stolen and cut to shreds, and Tomoko won't lend Nanako hers. Kaoru lends Nanako her uniform instead. Nanako is attacked by sophomores who did not make it into the sorority last year. Devastated, she attempts to resign from the Sorority, but Fukiko discourages her from listening to her tormenters and promises that Nanako that she will protect her—but this causes Nanako to remember how Fukiko injured Rei. Afterwards, Nanako goes out to think and bumps into Takehiko. He comforts her and somewhat lifts her spirits.
7	"The Darkness in the Clock Tower"; Transliteration: "Yami no Tokeitou" (Japanese: 闇の時計塔)	Kazuya Miyazaki	Chifude Asakura	25 August 1991
Depressed from her classmates' bullying, Nanako goes to the school's clock tower to spend some time alone. There, she sees Rei, smoking and throwing knives at a carving of Fukiko in the wall. Terrified but entranced by Rei, Nanako researches the origins of Rei's nickname and learns more about her from Kaoru. They part on good terms, but Aya and her friends begin attacking Nanako as soon as Kaoru leaves. She is rescued by Tomoko who threatens Aya and rekindles her friendship with Nanako.: In the manga, Tomoko rekindles her friendship with Nanako solely at the end of the story.
8	"I Want You"; Transliteration: "Anata ga Hoshii" (Japanese: あなたが欲しい)	Takuo Suzuki	Chifude Asakura	1 September 1991
Mariko tries to warn Tomoko off Nanako again, but Kaoru comes by and stops her. Fukiko invites Aya to the Sorority House and threatens her to stop bullying Nanako. Mariko invites Nanako to her birthday party - it is in a grand hotel room, but the only guests are Mariko's mother and Nanako. They return to Mariko's house, and Mariko and Nanako take a bath together. Mariko then tries to convince Nanako to stay overnight, but Nanako refuses because she'd promised her mother to be home. Mariko becomes upset and threatens to kill Nanako, causing Mariko's mother to restrain her as Nanako runs home.
9	"Relapse; Broken Heart"; Transliteration: "Hatsubyou, Kudakareta Kokoro" (Japanese: 発病, 砕かれた心)	Tadaoki Uda	Hideo Takayashiki	8 September 1991
Kaoru collapses from chest pains, so Nanako tries to fetch painkillers from Rei. Rei doesn't take the situation seriously, so Nanako slaps her. Rei is impressed by her boldness and gives her the painkillers, but Nanako is shocked by the amount of drugs Rei keeps in her pockets and the apparent severity of Kaoru's illness.
10	Transliteration: "Mariko..." (Japanese: マリ子...)	Toshiya Shinohara	Chifude Asakura	15 September 1991
Mariko refuses to eat anything until Nanako forgives her, but Nanako is giving her the silent treatment. Kaoru notices Mariko's hunger strike and confronts her about it, angry that anyone would throw their health away when Kaoru herself is so ill. Rei watches Kaoru, Nanako, and Mariko participate in a volleyball game from a balcony, but sees Fukiko glaring at her from a distance and nearly falls off. Mariko faints and is taken to the hospital, where Nanako finally decides to forgive her.: In the anime, Mariko's father is briefly seen arriving at the hospital to visit her. This doesn't happen in the manga.
11	"Under the Elm Tree"; Transliteration: "Nire no Ki nite..." (Japanese: 楡の木にて)	Fumihiro Yoshimura	Tomoko Konparu	22 September 1991
The Sorority members have a special study session at Fukiko's house. Fukiko invites Rei to join them, telling her to wait under the elm tree at five o'clock, but doesn't arrive. Nanako returns to school that night for her notebook, and finds Rei waiting under the tree, soaked from the rain and delirious with fever. Nanako tries to take Rei home, but she resists, unwilling to break her promise to Fukiko. Rei attempts to walk through heavy traffic and jump off a bridge in order to get back to the tree, but Nanako manages to stop her. She finally brings Rei home, but discovers that Rei lives alone in a dark, dreary apartment filled with mirrors. In her delirium, Rei thinks that Nanako is her treasured doll and hugs her.
12	"The Scar"; Transliteration: "Kizuato" (Japanese: きずあと)	Hideki Hiroshima	Masami Mori	29 September 1991
Nanako calls Kaoru to help take care of Rei. Kaoru arrives at Rei's apartment and slaps and yells at her for her masochistic devotion to Fukiko. She reveals that Rei's bracelet was given to her by Fukiko; she rips it off her wrist and tries to throw it out the window into the river, revealing a deep scar on Rei's wrist. Kaoru is forced to stop when Rei starts throwing knives at her, and Rei takes her bracelet back. Terrified, Nanako wonders whether or not Rei's scar was the result of a suicide attempt. Fukiko calls her to ask why she didn't return to the study group, and Nanako makes up a reasonable excuse. Fukiko pretends to believe her but correctly suspects the truth. She orders Nanako the next day at school not to get too close to Rei. Later, Nanako overhears Kaoru confronting Fukiko over what she'd done to Rei. During the argument, she finds out that Rei and Fukiko are sisters.
13	"A Tale of Double Suicide"; Transliteration: "Shinchuu Densetsu" (Japanese: 心中伝説)	Takuo Suzuki	Hideo Takayashiki	6 October 1991
Rei is well enough to go back to school. She confronts Fukiko, but is made docile with a few words. Tormented, she retreats to the clock tower and takes a lot of drugs. Looking for Rei, Nanako enters the clock tower, and finds her delusional and hallucinating. Believing Nanako to be Fukiko, Rei reveals that Fukiko had made a pact of double suicide with Rei when they were younger. She attacks Nanako with her knives, thinking that she is Fukiko and has arrived to fulfill that pact.
14	"The Secret Door"; Transliteration: "Himitsu no Tobira" (Japanese: 秘密の扉)	Shinichi Matsumi	Chifude Asakura	27 October 1991
Nanako desperately tries to escape from Rei, but fails. Rei attempts to stab Nanako several times before regaining her senses and breaking down in tears when she realizes what she is doing. They return to Rei's apartment and make peace. Later, Nanako tries to throw away Rei's drugs, but she catches her and angrily orders her to leave. Nanako goes to the beach and cries, but Rei finds and forgives her. Rei happily returns to school the next day despite the first day of midterms.
15	"Fukiko; The Sea Rumbles"; Transliteration: "Fukiko, Umi Nari" (Japanese: 蕗子, 海鳴り)	Fumihiro Yoshimura	Tomoko Konparu	3 November 1991
A Sorority member named Junko Nakaya fails one of her exams due to having been seriously ill, so Fukiko orders her to resign. Nanako tries to defend Junko, but Fukiko tells Nanako to watch her place, as Fukiko was the one responsible for her admission into the Sorority. Later, Fukiko invites the Sorority to a party on her yacht. She takes back her earlier statement, saying that Nanako was admitted to the Sorority on her own merit. But then she questions Nanako if she knows any men, and when Nanako mentions her "penpal", Fukiko orders her to stop writing to him - or else. Later, Junko speaks to Nanako and tells her that she has decided to resign anyway, but thanks Nanako for trying to help her.
16	"Comeback"; Transliteration: "KAMUBAKKU" (Japanese: カムバック)	Hideki Hiroshima	Masami Mori	10 November 1991
It is Kaoru's first basketball game since her illness, and she is determined to win. Her playing is so great that the entire opposing team is forced to block her. Kaoru is injured during the game and blood spurts from her chest. She begs Rei to take her place in the game, and Rei does so, even though Fukiko had forbidden her from playing basketball ever again. Rei plays to her fullest, and despite losing the game, is more alive and happy then she had been in a while. Nanako realizes that Mariko is in love with Kaoru, and her envies her openness with her emotions.: In the manga, Fukiko never forbids Rei to play basketball. She chooses to quit on her own free will, but when Kaoru is unable to play at full capacity due to her illness, Rei enters the game to back up her best friend.
17	"Post Scriptum"; Transliteration: "Tsuishin" (Japanese: 追伸)	Takuo Suzuki	Hideo Takayashiki	17 November 1991
Nanako realizes that she has fallen in love with Rei, but is too nervous to say anything. One of her letters to her "Brother" end up in Fukiko's possession and she must face her wrath.
18	"Into the Dream"; Transliteration: "Yume no Naka e" (Japanese: 夢の中へ)	Shinichi Matsumi	Chifude Asakura	24 November 1991
After Nanako accidentally misses her bus stop, Rei takes her to the park. The two spend a happy morning together, and in a burst of emotion, Nanako confesses her love.
19	"The Transient Game"; Transliteration: "Utakata GEEMU" (Japanese: うたかたゲーム)	Fumihiro Yoshimura	Tomoko Konparu	8 December 1991
Rei refuses to react after hearing Nanako's confession and begins to intentionally avoid her, breaking Nanako's heart. Kaoru, sensing Nanako's pain, tells her to give up on Rei, for "her soul is enslaved by a goddess," referring to Fukiko.
20	"The Gardening Shears"; Transliteration: "Hanabasami" (Japanese: 花鋏)	Hideki Hiroshima	Chifude Asakura	15 December 1991
Nanako and Tomoko decide to go to Takehiko's university fair. They invite Mariko, but she is reluctant because she thinks the men will corrupt Nanako. Fukiko overhears her brother and Takehiko talking about the fair, and is furious that Nanako is going. She invites Nanako to her house for a tea ceremony on the morning of the fair and locks her in the storage room in order to prevent her leaving, but Kaoru hears Nanako and frees her.
21	"The University Fair"; Transliteration: "Gakuen Matsuri" (Japanese: 学園祭)	Takuo Suzuki	Masami Mori	22 December 1991
Nanako, Tomoko, and Mariko go the University Fair with Takehiko and Takashi, Fukiko's older brother. Mariko does her best to protect Nanako from the men, but ends up comically failing.: In the manga, there are less interactions between Mariko and Takashi. Also, in the manga he's far cockier to Mariko than in the anime, where he's hilariously confused at her hostility.
22	"A Summer Day's Serenade"; Transliteration: "Natsu no Hi no SERENAADE" (Japanese: 夏の日のセレナーデ)	Shinichi Matsumi	Hideo Takayashiki	29 December 1991
Mariko and Nanako are invited by Fukiko to her country house for the weekend to help her prepare for her birthday party. There, Nanako goes for a walk near the lake and sees Fukiko playing her violin sadly. That night, Nanako can't sleep and sneaks out and finds Fukiko insane and tormented in a room, reciting Sonnet 18 over and over again. Nanako makes a noise, and Fukiko chases her through the house, but Nanako is not caught. The next day, Nanako questions a maid named Minako about the room - it is Fukiko's old bedroom that has been kept the way it was when she was twelve. Fukiko overhears them talking and fires the maid. Later, Nanako sees Fukiko swimming in the lake, and Fukiko pulls her in. Nanako nearly drowns, but Fukiko comes to her senses and saves her, apologizing that she'd only wanted someone to swim with her. At the end, Nanako re-encounters Minako and she tells her not to worry.
23	"The Forbidden Gift"; Transliteration: "Kinjirareta Okurimono" (Japanese: 禁じられた贈り物)	Fumihiro Yoshimura	Hideo Takayashiki	12 January 1992
Home from the lake house, Fukiko and Rei visit Ms. Asaka's grave on the anniversary of her death, three years ago. The two are unusually civil; as they part, Fukiko invites Rei to her eighteenth birthday party. The party proceeds uneventfully until Rei, oblivious, plays for Fukiko the violin piece she had earlier played alone in the woods. Incredibly upset at hearing the song, Fukiko cuts the violin strings with a knife, then flees the room, effectively causing a scene. Rei runs after her, confused as to her sister's reaction, believing Fukiko's frequent playing of the song to be out of a fondness for it. Fukiko responds that she hates the piece more than anything else in the world.
24	"Encore"; Transliteration: "ANKOORU" (Japanese: アンコール)	Hideki Hiroshima	Hideo Takayashiki	19 January 1992
Confused by the events of the party, Rei inquires of Takashi as to why the song upset Fukiko so. It is revealed that, when Fukiko was twelve and Takashi eighteen, Takashi had brought Takehiko Henmi to visit their lake house. Fukiko had instantly fallen for the young man, and had vowed that, by the time of their farewell party, she would have mastered a difficult violin piece that she would play solely for him. Due to an emergency, Takehiko was unable to attend. Relaying this story, Takashi realizes with a sinking clarity that Fukiko had perhaps fallen in love with Takehiko. Later, at the Ichinomiya mansion, Takashi mentions to Fukiko that he spent time with Rei, and that they discussed the events of six years previous. Feeling very emotionally violated, Fukiko leaves the room, to reminisce in private. The love she felt for Takehiko made her happier than anything else. When he failed to appear, her young heart was prematurely crushed, and her faith destroyed. In a fit of passion, she ran out of the room and attempted to drown herself in the lake.: The events of episodes 22-24 do not happen in the manga.
25	"The Scarlet Lipstick"; Transliteration: "Bara no RUUJU" (Japanese: 薔薇のルージュ)	Yutaka Satō	Tomoko Konparu	26 January 1992
Rei reminisces about the first time she met Fukiko, remembering how, even as a child, her pride had still been admirable. She then overhears two Sorority members telling Nanako to meet Fukiko at the Sorority House suspiciously late at night. Nanako goes, and is shocked and scared to find that Fukiko has put on scarlet lipstick for their private meeting. Fukiko puts make-up on Nanako to make her look like a doll and confesses her love to Nanako. She then asks her to leave Takehiko and be with her, instead. Nanako is frozen with fear by Fukiko's seduction, but Rei bursts in the room and breaks it up before Fukiko goes too far. Enraged that Fukiko could lower herself to such a level, Rei angrily tells Fukiko that she knows Fukiko loves Takehiko, and that she'd admitted Nanako into the Sorority so she could steal her away from him. Fukiko runs out of the room in anger, and Rei tackles Nanako and kisses the ear Fukiko had kissed. The encounter leaves all three tormented: Fukiko is angry that Rei had "ruined" her treasured secret, Rei is tortured that she had made her beloved Fukiko angry, and Nanako is traumatized by the events of the night and the knowledge that her Sorority selection hadn't been fair after all.
26	"The Promise in the Snow"; Transliteration: "Akashi, Futari Dake no Yuki" (Japanese: あかし, 二人だけの雪)	Shinichi Matsumi	Masami Mori	2 February 1992
Rei reflects on that double suicide pact that she and Fukiko made shortly after Rei's mother committed suicide, when Rei was soon to be properly adopted by the Ichinomiya family. Fearing any further abandonments by those she loved, Fukiko convinced Rei that they could preserve their happiness in death. Fukiko cut Rei's wrist for her, but was overcome by the horror of what she had done and did not follow on her own, instead panicking and screaming for help as she carried the dying Rei. Both Rei's bracelet and doll were gifts from Fukiko as compensation - presumably due to the perceived singular suicide attempt, Rei was no longer to live with the Ichinomiya family. In the present, Rei confronts Fukiko, saying that she had wished to die not for the sake of their happiness, but instead in response to the pain of losing Takehiko. Fukiko vehemently denies this; in an act illustrating the extent to which her misery and antipathy for life has maintained, Fukiko prepares to leap from a tall building, inviting Rei to join her. Fukiko jumps; Rei pulls her back at the last moment, tearfully apologizing for ever doubting her. Her unhappiness now apparent, and her fate still to live, Fukiko screams.: In the manga, Rei and Fukiko do not discuss the sincerity of the suicide pact until the Petition Arc. Also, the reason Rei does not move in with the Ichinomiya's is because Fukiko threw a fit and said that she'd prefer death to the prospect of having a bastard sister live at her house.
27	"An Incident of Bloodshed"; Transliteration: "MARIko Ninjou Jiken" (Japanese: マリ子刃傷事件)	Fumihiro Yoshimura	Katsuhiko Koide	23 February 1992
Mariko's parents are divorcing and she is traumatized, spending the night at Nanako's home to try coping. Things get even worse because it's almost Mariko's birthday: as she, Nanako and Tomoko are celebrating, they find Mariko's father and his girlfriend (after he had said that he wouldn't be able to meet with her), which makes her run away crying. Mariko returns home and has a fight with her mother over how she never says anything about her father's affair, and at night she seriously ponders cutting her own wrists with a boxcutter. At school, Aya cruelly taunts Mariko, reading a newspaper article about Mariko's father's affair aloud to the classroom, in which Nanako angrily tries to stop her. This pushes the still very unstable Mariko over the edge and she attacks Aya with the same boxcutter she almost used on herself. She runs away from school and is about to jump off from a bridge, but Takashi Ichinomiya grabs her before she can do so.: The backstory behind Mariko's complicated relationship with her parents, plus the encounter with her father and his lover, are anime-only. Also, in the manga Mariko is simply carrying a random house knife for no explained reasons, rather than a boxcutter (which a highschool student would use in crafting classes).
28	"The Christmas Candles"; Transliteration: "KURISUMASU KYANDORU" (Japanese: クリスマスキャンドル)	Hideki Hiroshima	Hideo Takayashiki	1 March 1992
Everyone desperately looks for the missing Mariko, fearing for the worst. This includes both of Mariko's parents and even Mr. Shinobu's girlfriend, who calls her mother and apologizes. Ultimately, when Takashi manages to help Mariko calm down enough, she returns home. Mariko's father feels extremely guilty for his part on Mariko's emotional instability and attempts to talk to her too, with mixed results. Mariko is suspended and expelled from the Sorority for her attack on Aya. Believing the expulsion to be unfair, Nanako quits the Sorority as well.: Again, Mariko's personal deals with her parents are anime-only.
29	"The Assembly"; Transliteration: "Seitou Soukai" (Japanese: 生徒総会)	Yutaka Satō	Tomoko Konparu	8 March 1992
At the Student Assembly, Kaoru asks for the abolition of the Sorority. Rei is horrified at first, believing that it would destroy Fukiko's pride, but ultimately decides that she has to learn to live without the Sorority in order to be truly strong. Rei, Kaoru, and Nanako begin collecting signatures for the petition. Two-thirds of the student body need to sign it before they can submit it to the school board.
30	"The Petition"; Transliteration: "Shomei Undou" (Japanese: 署名運動)	Takuo Suzuki	Hideo Takayashiki; Katsuhiko Koide	15 March 1992
Two Sorority members, Ogiwara and Komabayashi, persuade Aya's friends, Miyuki and Megumi, to steal and burn the petitions. Rei stops them. Aya intentionally takes the blame to protect the girls, saying that she'd ordered her friends to do so, but not before insulting Nanako once more, making Nanako very angry as she snaps back at Aya. Mariko reminisces their rivalry to Nanako and Tomoko. That night, Aya attempts to drown herself in the ocean, but the three of them save her: Megumi and Miyuki revealed the truth to them and Kaoru, and they've been searching for her. Mariko and Aya rekindle their lost friendship, and Aya signs the petition the next day.
31	"The Bad Apple"; Transliteration: "Kusatta Kajitsu" (Japanese: 腐った果実)	Fumihiro Yoshimura	Tomoko Konparu; Masami Mori	22 March 1992
The Sorority members are getting scared as the Petition gains movement and their own members begin signing it. Angered at Fukiko's lack of action of the subject, Ogiwara and Kombayashi decide to take matters into their own hands by confronting Nanako in a broken down building. Nanako alerts Kaoru but goes on her own anyway, and the confrontation gets heated...
32	"Pride, and the Final Meeting"; Transliteration: "Hokori, RASUTO MIITINGU" (Japanese: 誇り, ラストミーティング)	Jun Takada	Tomoko Konparu	29 March 1992
Fukiko continues to pretend that nothing is wrong. At the final Sorority meeting, none of the members arrive. Rei attends the meeting instead, and encourages Fukiko to continue with her speech. Fukiko enthusiastically does so, saying that she will never lose her dignity no matter what, impressing Nanako with her pride.: In the manga, this does not happen and Fukiko is furious at Rei for ruining her life.
33	"Fly High"; Transliteration: "Hishou" (Japanese: 飛翔)	Hideki Hiroshima	Hideo Takayashiki	4 April 1992
Rei dreams of her mother's death, in which Ms. Asaka reveals that Fukiko is her child as well. She was adopted immediately after her birth, depriving her mother of any chance to be near her. As Ms. Asaka walks into the ocean, she tells Rei to protect her elder sister. In the present, Rei tells Kaoru that she is no longer concerned with preserving Fukiko's pride, seeing that it is still plenty strong on its own. Having been absolved of this worry, she shares that she is feeling better than ever. At the Ichinomiya house, Fukiko receives a call from her father. She is quite friendly with him, and quells any worries of his that the Sorority situation might have upset her. Mr. Ichinomiya also asks after Rei; Takashi is surprised to hear this, but Fukiko tells him that their father is always worried about how Rei is doing. Later, Rei reveals to Nanako that Fukiko is really her full sister, rather than her half-sister, but she never told Fukiko this because she feared that the knowledge of her illegitimate status would destroy her. Seeing that Fukiko's pride is steady, though, she resolves to live happily. She promises to take Nanako to see the sunset, presumably at the location where her mother committed suicide. The next day, we are shown a Rei who seems fully recovered. She cleans her room, has a fully stocked refrigerator, and tells Kaoru that Verlaine's "Like city's rain, my heart" no longer suits her mood. On the way to her meeting spot with Nanako, she purchases a bouquet of roses for delivery, as well as a single flower to give Nanako. Crossing the overpass, she loses her grip on the flowers; in reaching to catch them, she overbalances and falls into the path of an oncoming train. She is killed.: In the manga, Rei tells this secret to Nanako after a confrontation with Fukiko. Angry at Rei's attempts to abolish the Sorority, Fukiko tells her that she'd never loved her, only driving her to suicide and then keeping her around in order to feel superior. Tormented, Rei confesses to Nanako that she really needs her support and comfort. Nanako thinks that this confession marks the beginning of their relationship, but Rei dies from a drug overdose the next day.; Also of note is the continuity error at the start of the episode. In Rei's dream, we are shown a very young Rei, possibly four or five. However, in episode twenty-five the ten-year-old Rei mentions being accompanied by her mother to meet Fukiko. She also says that her mother had "just died" before the double-suicide, and when Fukiko and Rei are at Ms. Asaka's grave, Fukiko remarks that it has been "three years" since she died. This would make Rei around thirteen or fourteen at the time of her mother's suicide.
34	"Ablution"; Transliteration: "Mokuyoku" (Japanese: 沐浴)	Yutaka Satō	Hideo Takayashiki	12 April 1992
Nanako waits for Rei to pick her up for their date, but soon, everyone finds out that Rei is dead. Nanako, Tomoko, Fukiko, Kaoru, and Takashi go to the hospital to see Rei's body. The police won't let Takashi and Fukiko take the body to be buried, as she may have committed suicide and they want to investigate. Nanako goes home and cries in her room, phoning Rei's apartment, and her parents discuss Rei. Fukiko receives a bouquet of red roses from Rei and a letter, and when she reads the letter, she cries. The next day at school, the police question the students. Nanako stays at home, but later tells her mother she's going to school. She instead goes to the place Rei died and cries. She sees Kaoru and follows her. Nanako tells Kaoru that Rei had planned to see her the next day, and thus, could not have committed suicide. The police conclude that Rei did not commit suicide because a boy had seen her fall, and they tell Takashi and Fukiko about her last moments. Nanako wonders where Rei intended to take her on the date. Fukiko bathes with the roses, sobbing and telling Rei she loved her.
35	"A Beach of Dreams"; Transliteration: "Yume Kaigan" (Japanese: 夢海岸)	Fumihiro Yoshimura	Tomoko Konparu	19 April 1992
The school attends Rei's funeral. Fukiko accepts all of the guests with dignity. Afterwards, she asks for two minutes alone and cries over Rei, telling her that she really did love her, and kisses her. Outside, Nanako hallucinates about Rei, imagining that she turns into a bird and flies away, while Takashi breaks down crying on Takehiko's shoulder. Later that night, she smokes one of Rei's cigarettes, and goes to Rei's apartment, where she finds Fukiko. They stay there until dawn. Nanako takes Rei's doll as a memento of her. Fukiko's chauffeur drives Fukiko and Nanako home. On the way, Fukiko reveals to Nanako that she'd known all along that Rei and Fukiko were full sisters, not half-sisters. Mrs. Ichinomiya had told Fukiko the secret on her death bed. Horrified by the secret of her illegitimate birth, as well as the accompanying realization that Rei was her full sister, Fukiko truly felt guilt for what had transpired between her and her sister in the snow. She confesses that she had tried to make herself hate Rei in the aftermath, but was unable to, instead suffering in perceived solitude with the truth of their situation. She now regrets not telling Rei, thinking the two could have shared a different sort of bond if she had. Nanako remembers that Rei had known about their true parentage too, but does not tell Fukiko, promising to herself that she'd take their secret to the grave. Fukiko, wearing Rei's bracelet, goes to the place where they'd made their suicide pact and vows to leave her past behind. The next day at school, Fukiko requests the dissolution of the Sorority.
36	"Glowing Fireflies, Blazing Passion"; Transliteration: "Hotarubi, Koi ni Moete..." (Japanese: 蛍火, 恋に燃えて...)	Kazuo Nogami	Masami Mori; Tomoko Konparu	26 April 1992
Two weeks after Rei dies, it is the summer holidays. Kaoru goes for an examination and is told by her doctor that she needs more tests. She reacts badly, thinking she is going to die. Nanako and Tomoko visit the roadside shrine to Rei, and see Kaoru sitting a short distance away, crying bitterly. Kaoru skips class for over two days, and Nanako realizes that Kaoru is suffering despite all her inner strength. Nanako runs into Takashi and he explains to her that Kaoru and Takehiko were in love, but split up. Kaoru goes to the place she ended her relationship with Takehiko, but he sees her there, so she runs away. At school, Nanako meets Kaoru in the clock tower, and Kaoru tells her that she had breast cancer and got a mastectomy. The little hope present for recovery from a relapse within five years has Kaoru petrified, waiting for a potential axe to fall.
37	"Carousel"; Transliteration: "Kaitenmokuba" (Japanese: 回転木馬(メリーゴ-ランド))	Hideki Hiroshima	Tomoko Konparu; Katsuhiko Koide	3 May 1992
Kaoru tells Nanako that she broke up with Takehiko because of her illness and mastectomy, and that Nanako is really Takehiko's stepsister. Nanako's father tells Nanako that she has a stepbrother, and that he loves his son as much as he loves her. Nanako is relieved and visits Takehiko. She asks him half-jokingly what he would have done if she'd fallen in love with him, and he is flabbergasted. Later that night, Kaoru rings Takehiko and apologizes for telling Nanako that Takehiko is her real brother before hanging up. Takehiko and Kaoru remember a date where they went to the fair and rode on a carousel. Takehiko goes to his father for a reference for his study in Germany, and his father wishes him well.
38	"Yes"; Transliteration: "YES..."	Yutaka Satō	Hideo Takayashiki	10 May 1992
Takehiko is about to leave for Germany, so Kaoru intends to leave him behind for good. Takehiko, Nanako, and Fukiko try to convince her that Rei would have wanted her to live her life to the fullest. Kaoru ultimately accepts Takehiko's marriage proposal, and the two of them agree to move to Germany together.: In the manga, Fukiko is not involved in convincing Kaoru to marry Takehiko.
39	"A Lingering Fragrance"; Transliteration: "Nokori Kaoru" (Japanese: 残り香)	Fumihiro Yoshimura	Hideo Takayashiki	17 May 1992
Fukiko has a hallucination where Rei encourages her to find true love. Fukiko is tormented, thinking that Takehiko was the only love she'd ever have, and cries in her brother's arms. Kaoru and Takehiko marry and move to Germany. Nanako watches their plane leave and remembers Rei. Two years later, she finds out that Takehiko and a now-healthy Kaoru have a child, and meets a lover of her own.: In the manga, Kaoru remains tomboyish (as much, she wears a somewhat girlier blouse when last seen), and dies two years into her marriage. Nanako cries for two days when she hears the news, and begins writing a letter of comfort to her brother.
