= The Foxes of Chironup Island =

- Directed by: Tetsuo Imazawa
- Written by: Fukuo Matsuyama
- Based on: "The Foxes of Chironup Island" by Hiroyuki Takahashi
- Starring: Mikiko Otonashi; Shinobu Adachi; Tsutomu Sasaki; Ishikawa Hiromi; Ryūji Saikachi; Hisako Kyōda
- Music by: Etsujiro Gotoh
- Production company: Group TAC
- Release date: 1987
- Running time: 72 minutes (1h 12m)
- Country: Japan
- Language: Japanese

The Foxes of Chironup Island (チロヌップのきつね, Chironuppu no kitsune) is a 1987 Japanese animated film, directed by Tetsuo Imazawa. It was based on the eponymous children's book by Hiroyuki Takahashi.

== Plot ==
The story happened on a fictional island called "Chironup" (fox in Ainu language) in the Northern Japan. Two foxes were born around the time the fox-cherry blossoms (a made-up flower from the original book) bloomed in spring. Ken, the father, and Chin, the mother, lived in peace, naming the boy Kang and the girl Koro. Every year, at this time of year, an elderly fisherman couple comes to pick kelp. In front of the Jizo, they met Koro, who had fallen apart from their parents, and then they loved them like their own children. One day, the old couple accidentally met Koro's parents outside. Despite them loving Koro very much, they still decided to let Koro return to his family.

In the fall, the war became fierce every day, and soldiers came to the island. The soldiers want fox fur, and Kang and Ken are shot with guns. Koro also falls into a trap set by the soldiers and is unable to move. Chin carried food to such a roller with all her might. Eventually it was winter and it began to snow. Chin has difficulty walking and cannot carry food. Snow falls on the hugging Chin and roller. Time has passed, the war is over, and spring has come. The old couple, who returned to Chironup Island, found the fox-cherry blossoms blooming together like two parent-child foxes. There was a bell collar that fisherman's wife put on Koro's neck by her side. The old woman picked up the collar and hugged it for a long time, and blessed the fox family who died.

== Cast ==
Character	Japanese voice actor	Description
Chin (チン)	Mikiko Otonashi	Mother fox
Ken (ケン)	Tsutomu Sasaki	Father fox
Koro (コロ)	Shinobu Adachi	Female little fox, daughter of Chin and Ken
Kang (カン)	Ishikawa Hiromi	Male little fox, son of Chin and Ken
Fisherman	Ryūji Saikachi	Resident on the island
Fisherman's wife	Hisako Kyōda	Resident on the island
