= Yamato Takeru (TV series) =

1994 Japanese anime television series

- Box cover of Yamato Takeru complete edition 7 DVD

ヤマトタケル
- Genre: Adventure, science fantasy, mecha
- Anime television series
- Directed by: Shuji Iuchi (chief director); Katsuyoshi Yatabe
- Studio: Nippon Animation
- Original network: JNN (TBS)
- Original run: April 9, 1994 – December 24, 1994
- Episodes: 37
- Original video animation

Yamato Takeru: After War
- Directed by: Shuji Iuchi
- Written by: Shuji Iuchi
- Studio: Zero-G Room
- Released: November 22, 1995
- Runtime: 45 minutes (each)
- Episodes: 2

Yamato Takeru (Japanese: ヤマトタケル) is a 1994 Japanese anime television series loosely related to the Japanese mythology, specifically Shinto and the legendary prince of the same name, and the 1963 anime film The Little Prince and the Eight-Headed Dragon. Despite the title, it doesn't set in feudal Japan and the characters are named after Japanese legendary figures instead. The series revolves around a young Ismo human named Takeru who goes on a great adventure that would grant him great powers and the understanding that his destiny is linked to the world.

It, along with the tokusatsu film Orochi, the Eight-Headed Dragon by Toho, and an eponymous manga series by Shogakukan consisited a media mix campaign to explores the same theme albeit with different conceptions and storytellings.

The series is followed up by the 1995 two-episode original video animation Yamato Takeru: After War.

== Synopsis ==
Million years ago, the Onam System, which corresponds to the Solar System, once has eight planets, until the "time of the gods", there was a war against the evil eight-headed extraterrestrial dragon named Orochi. After the gods won the battle, Orochi's remains was locked into eight capsules, one of which is buried deep in the center of each planet. Nobody was supposed to have access to the core of the planets. However, Tsukuyomi (named after Japanese moon god of the same name), an evil "god" who rules the comet and the space station called Death Star Yomi (based on Death Star from Star Wars franchise), succeeded in reaching the capsules one after another. Seven of the planets were destroyed using his powerful mechas, the Evil Sky Warriors. However, when he tried to acquire the last capsule from Ismo, the most powerful Sky Warrior, Susanoo (named after Japanese sea god of the same name), got out of control and was blown away, leaving Ismo as the only planet of the system.

Million years later in the 25th century, a spaceship carrying 300 scientists leaves the Earth in search of a new world in the Solar System, but an unexpected accident occurs. They encountered a black hole that is connected to Onam System through space and time. The people on board abandoned their ship and ejected emergency capsules to Ismo. Upon the chaos, a child was born and the first human infant to be native Ismo, Takeru (named after Japanese legendary prince of the same name).

12 years has passed, Death Star Yomi is approaching the Onam System once again. As Tsukuyomi plans to take this opportunity to realize his prophecy of ruling the entire universe, he is desperate for the last stone containing remaining Orochi's head and if he can get hold of this capsule, Orochi's power will becomes his own. As Tsukuyomi needs Susanoo to abstract Orochi's remains and dispatches Sky Soldiers to retrieve Susanoo, but Susanoo belongs to now teenage Takeru, who discovered the buried Susanoo and woke it from its million-year-long sleep. Takeru becomes involved in the battle against the Sky Soldiers and the fate of all in Ismo.

== Voice cast ==
- Chafurin as Ma Horoba
- Ai Orikasa as Kushinada
- Akira Ishida as Amatsumi
- Atsuko Tanaka as Shaman
- Ayumi Kida as Kiriomi
- Hiromi Ishikawa as Manta Namuji
- Kazuhiro Nakata as Yamato Yoshio
- Kenichi Ono as Mark
- Kenyuu Horiuchi as Tsukuyomi
- Kumiko Takizawa as Asuka
- Masahiro Anzai as Ouka
- Megumi Ogata as Roka
- Mika Kanai as Oto Tachibana
- Run Sasaki as Yamato Kaoru
- Satoko Kitô as Hayamika
- Toshiyuki Morikawa as Mikazuchi
- Yoshiko Kamei as Yamato Takeru

== Japanese Production Staff ==
Chief Director:

Shuji Iuchi

Director:

Katsuyoshi Yatabe (credited as Futa Morita)

Series Composition:

Shuji Iuchi

Script:

Shuji Iuchi
Katsuyoshi Yatabe
Masaharu Amiya
Nobuaki Kishima
Nobuyuki Fujimoto
Ryo Saga

Episode Director:

Hiroyuki Ishido
Jiro Saito
Kazuyoshi Yokota
Nobuhiro Kondo
Shin-ichi Masaki
Shinji Sakai
Takeshi Yoshimoto
Toshiaki Kanbara
Yoshitaka Fujimoto
Yusuke Yamamoto

Music:

Osamu Tezuka
Vink

Character Design:

Takahiro Kishida

Mecha design:

Koichi Ohata

== Characters ==
=== Yamato Takeru ===
He's the first human to be born and raised in Ismo and based on Japanese legendary prince of the same name. While living in the village, he was the star trouble maker of the group. He was respected amongst his peers as the leader and bring no end to mischief (for good or bad intentions). After he encounters Susanoo and used the destructive powers of the mech to defeat their enemies attacking the village, the villagers banished the mech and blame it for their misfortune. Yamato cannot deal with the superstitious nature of the villagers and opted to leave with his best friend to see the world. It was his journey not long that would allow him to meet Oto and new friends and enemies. After defeating Orochi, he leaves Susanoo where he once rested in the caves and visits him to talk. Because there's no epilogue, it is assumed that Yamato will still cause some trouble in the village as he used to. He'll also probably end up with Oto and start a life together in the village.

In After War, Yamato is called again to pilot Susanoo when a piece of the Dark Sky Carriage falls near the village and Shuranoo reveals itself. But when Yamato refuses to fight Shuranoo, who is possessed by Mikazuchi, Shuranoo mercilessly slashes at Susanoo and then sends it into the lake where it is rescued and healed by the Dragon Carrier. The renewed Susanoo flies off to find Oto who had been kidnapped by Shuranoo. In the end, Yamato was going to sacrifice himself and Oto (willingly) to defeat Tsukiyomi by flying into the sun. Before they get to the melting point, Mikazuchi appears and tells them that he would pilot Susanoo and that Yamato and Oto should live out their lives. Tears fall from Yamato's eyes as Susanoo looks back at him once more before flying into the sun destroying himself and Tsukiyomi.

=== Oto Tachibana ===
She's the sister to Mikazuchi, love interest of Takeru and based on Yamato Takeru's legendary lover of the same name. She was sent as an undercover agent to win Yamato's trust and steal Susanoo away from Yamato and murder him. Things become complicated as Oto develops a real bond with the group and even falls for Yamato. Because she has been contaminated, she was also marked for death amongst her peers. She later finds out that she's actually not related to Mikazuchi, but a little girl taken away from her real mother. Mikazuchi however never knew about this and after being possessed by Orochi he used the dark energies of Orochi to corrupt Oto's soul. It was not until Orochi broken the psionic bind between Mikazuchi and his mech that her mind was free from dark influence. Towards the end of the series she now lives in the village along with Yamato. There was no epilogue to speak of her fate, but it is assumed that she will eventually have a real romantic relationship with Takeru and marry him.

In After War, Oto had because a member of the Yakumo Village along with Hayamika. When Shuranoo attacks the village, she is kidnapped and taken to Tsukiyomi who then reveals that it is a parasite that had latched on to her mum's body. She is then absorbed by Tsukiyomi while her mum is released. Yamato follows but is hesitant at attacking because Oto was a part of it. In the end Yamato realises that to defeat Tsukiyomi they need to fly her into the sun so he grabs her and heads towards the sun but before they reach the sun Mikazuchi appears and tells them to live their lives full and tells them that he approves of them causing tears to run down Oto's face. Mikazuchi frees them and sends them back towards the Dragon Carrier as Susanoo and Tsukiyomi meet their ends.

=== Roka ===
He's the best friend to Takeru and in many ways his second conscience. Roka was always afraid of the things Yamato would do because it tends to be dangerous or morally conflicting. When Yamato chose to leave their village, Roka tagged along for the journey. Through their adventures together between battling Sky Warriors and avoiding danger, he learned to become a stronger person. By the time they returned to their home village, Roka has become wiser and braver than he used to. He returns in After War as a scholar and wears glasses now.

=== Sky Warriors and Soldiers ===
In the anime, all the giant extraterrestrial mechas are called "Demon Air War Gods" or "Dark Sky Warriors" in Japanese. These robots are bio-mechanized with their own personalities, feelings, and unique powers. All the pilots of these fantastic machines are actually kidnapped children that were trained to be obedient, skillful, and murderous agents of their dark priestess. Though robotic in form, they are made through bio-mechanical incubation and have the ability to evolve over time to take even more powerful forms. All "Demon Air War Gods" recharge through special bacta-like pods which repairs and recharges their energies, but because they are also living machines they can eat as well. All their internal cockpits have crystal orbs which act as an interface with their pilot and also respond to human emotions to react accordingly to the pilots feelings. In After War, when Susanoo's arm is cut off it reveals a beating body of flesh underneath that further proves that the Sky Warriors are indeed alive. Because this series was never English subbed/dubbed, only their Japanese names remains:

Susanoo
Susanoo is a mecha named after Japanese sea god of the same name, it once belonged to a merciless unnamed pilot that used Susanoo's powers to destroy seven worlds. Susanoo's pilot for unexplained reasons landed upon the green planet and died there leaving his sword behind along with his remains. Yamato would eventually stumble upon Susanoo and used its destructive powers for good, but never once realizing that inside Susanoo also lies the dark spirit of the one of eight-headed dragon. Through combat, Susanoo eventually evolved into a larger and more powerful form to defeat his enemies. The dark dragon spirit that once resided in Susanoo left when the very energies that bound him were used to revive Yamato. In time the dark energies that resided in Susanoo were cleansed through Yamato's journey. Susanoo would eventually develop a psychic link with Yamato and respond to his every thought and intention. In the After War OVA Susanoo is once again called upon against a revived Shuranoo but because of Yamato's unwillingness to destroy Mikazuchi, Susanoo is beaten and loses an arm in the process. Shuranoo pushes Susanoo into the Yakumo lake where it was healed by the Dragon Carrier and subsequently evolve into his 3rd form which is a red samurai-themed armor. In the end, Yamato takes Susanoo towards the sun taking Tsukiyomi and Oto with it, but Mikazuchi intervenes and takes control of Susanoo and sends Yamato and Oto back to Earth as he sacrifices himself to kill Tsukiyomi and approving Yamato and Oto being together.

Shuranoo
Amon pilots "the strongest demon air war God." Shuranoo was coined the "most powerful." While under Amon's piloting skills Shuranoo was indeed formidable, but proven at best on par in battle strength with Gaiou and Susanoo. After Amon died, no one else was left to pilot Shuranoo and so Shuranoo was left behind in the "Dark Sky Carriage". Its fate was left an answered until After War where it is revealed that it had survived the "Dark Sky Carriage"'s destruction. It appears in Yakumo village in the dead of night where it starts to cause chaos forcing Yamato to pilot Susanoo again. It is revealed that in fact Mikazuchi was controlling it. It easily beats Susanoo and then kidnaps Oto who is inside Tamanoo to Tsukiyomi. Its next appearance is when Tsukiyomi creates an amalgamation of all the defeated Dark Air War Gods and the remains of the Yamata no Orochi into one horrific beast. Only through Susanoo using light from the sun powering his sword was the beast defeated.

Tamanoo
Tamanoo is initially piloted by Amatsumi but after he is killed by Kiriomi, Yamato's new friend Kaon tries to pilot it. Even though Amatsumi was dead, Tamanoo is still shrouded in his evil presence. Only through Yamato playing his ocarina is the evil presence destroyed and Kaon is able to pilot it. In Susanoo's first stage Tamanoo towers over it but the difference is less apparent in its second stage. In After War, during Susanoo and Ashuranoo's battle, Oto pilots Tamanoo but after Shuranoo knocks Susanoo into the lake, it kidnaps Oto and takes her to Tsukiyomi. Its next appearance is when Tsukiyomi creates an amalgamation of all the defeated Dark Air War Gods and the remains of the YamatanoOrochi into one horrific beast. Only through Susanoo using light from the sun powering his sword was the beast defeated.

Tokinoo
Kushinada pilots Tokinoo. Tokinoo and Shishinoo are both defeated by Gaioh. Its last appearance is when Tsukiyomi creates an amalgamation of all the defeated Dark Air War Gods and the remains of the Yamata no Orochi into one horrific beast. Only through Susanoo using light from the sun powering his sword was the beast defeated.

Shishinoo
Kiriyuu pilots Shishinoo. Kiriyuu has the ability to predict his enemie's movements which gives him an advantage though it is useless when there are thunderstorms. Shishinoo and Tokinoo are both defeated by Gaioh. Its last appearance is when Tsukiyomi creates an amalgamation of all the defeated Dark Air War Gods and the remains of the Yamata no Orochi into one horrific beast. Only through Susanoo using light from the sun powering his sword was the beast defeated.

Kazenoo
Kiriomi pilots Kazenoo, a blue and green schemed "Dark Sky Warrior." Though not the most powerful, it was a high speed combatant able to fly and move swifter than any of the mechs. It was the fourth mech to pursue and destroy Susanoo and Yamato. After several failed attempts to kill Yamato and procure Susanoo, Kazenii and Kiriomi were presumed destroyed as the mech was destroyed in battle and Kiriomi falling into molten rock. However in a later episode it is revealed that Kazenoo was discarded into space. While a little banged up, it wasn't blown into pieces as last scene. It was left as floating space debris above a blue planet where Kiriomi was actually held imprisoned in a crystal casing. After Kiriomi was revived and reformed, Kazenoo was part of the Golden Dragon Carriage's complement and protected Yamato's village when it was attacked during the final stages of the battle. Kazenoo is one of the few mechs in this series that endured the most beatings and managed to survive throughout the whole series. It is presumed Kiriomi has either taken Kazenoo with him to another place or left to "sleep" in a cave like Susanoo as such machines are no longer needed in time of peace. In After War, when Tsukiyomi creates a horrific creature formed from the remains of the YamatanoOrochi and the defeated Dark Air War Gods, Susanoo repeatedly slashes at the beast but its regeneration meant he was only using up his energy. At this time, Kazenoo piloted by Kiriomi appears to help him. After the beast is slain, Tsukiyomi tries to escape into outer space and Kazenoo follows only to be hit by an attack that disintegrates his shoulder armour and sends him flying back towards the Dragon Carrier.

Aranoo
Ouka pilots Amanoo and the least violent one of the group. He always had feelings for Oto, but never once told her of his feelings for her. He initially tries to approach Yamato to give Oto a message from Mikazuchi. Later it fights with Susanoo but Oto climbs into Susanoo and thrusts the Sword of Kusanagi into Aranoo's chest and injures Ouka. Mikazuchi takes Aranoo after knocking out Ouka to fight a renewed Susanoo who blocks his fatal attack on an unconscious Yamato. Yamato climbs onto Susanoo and renews his fight with Mikazuchi. Aranoo loses because of the previous damage to its body and a piece of shrapnel flies towards Oto who is watching the fight on a cliff. When Aranoo was defeated and exploded, the arm was still intact and fell on top of Oto. Ouka uses all his strength to hold up the weight of the mech arm to have Yamato save Oto. Because he was severely injured the weight of the arm fell on him and as he was dying he gave a small white flower to Oto and died. They later removed his body and gave him a proper burial. Its last appearance is when Tsukiyomi creates an amalgamation of all the defeated Dark Air War Gods and the remains of the Yamata no Orochi into one horrific beast. Only through Susanoo using light from the sun powering his sword was the beast defeated.

Tsukinoo
Hayamika pilots Tsukinoo. Tsukinoo resembles a female samurai-like Sky Warrior with violet coloring scheme. Tsukinoo appeared to kill Takeru after she was tricked in rage to kill him. After she calmed down, Tsukinoo suffered a conflict between Tsukinoo when her emotions caused a backlash in the system and caused her Sky Warrior to go berserk and explode. Its last appearance is when Tsukiyomi creates an amalgamation of all the defeated Dark Air War Gods and the remains of the Yamata no Orochi into one horrific beast. Only through Susanoo using light from the sun powering his sword was the beast defeated.

Gaiou
The "demon air war god" which takes in the "Spirit of the Eight Headed Dragon" from Susanoo. Gaiou was the latest "Dark Sky Warrior" to be made by the Dark Priestess and rewarded to Mikazuchi if he completed his mission of recovering Susanoo and killing Yamato. During the battle between Susanoo, Yamato died and was revived by the same powers that bound the "Spirit of the Eight Headed Dragon" and went wild. After several failed attacks on Yamato, the "Spirit of the Eight Headed Dragon" spirited into space where it sensed Gaiou. Overriding Gaiou's systems, it possessed the mech and "rescued" Mikazuchi to use him as a vessel to achieve its goals. Because the "Spirit of the Eight Headed Dragon" resides within Gaiou, he can act on his own with intent. After "Spirit of the Eight Headed Dragon" made it to its incubating body within the "Dark Sky Carriage", Gaiou was vaporized as the Eight Headed Dragon was revived. Gaiou may not be the most powerful, but Mikazuchi proved he can go head to head with anyone who fights him including Susanoo and Shuranoo. Nearing the final stages of the anime he is able to acquire the power of Amanoshiratori and combines gaioh with it, giving Gaiou and additional layer of armor. In this state he is able to defeat both Shishinoo and Tokinoo at the same time. Gaiou was never defeated in battle, but the power of Orochi's rebirth destroyed Gaiou, Shuranoo, and the entire floating fortress Death Star Yomi. It does not appear in After War.

Amanoshiratori
The Amanoshiratori is a legendary extraterrestrial phoenix that Takeru tries to acquire the power of to stop Tsukiyomi. The Amanoshiratori gives Yamato a test. Whether he values its power more or his friend's lives. Mikazuchi is also present but Takeru could not give up his friends for the power of Amanoshiratori and so Mikazuchi takes its power to make Gaiou even stronger. When Oto's body is taken over by the "Spirit of the Eight Headed Dragon", she pilots it. When Gaiou is vaporized in the "Dark Sky Carriage", so is Amanoshiratori's body. But when Susanoo falls from the "Dark Sky Carriage", Amanoshiratori's spirit flies down to protect Susanoo and Takeru. It does not appear in After War. Its name later used as a name of the phoenix character in 1994 Toho tokusatsu film Orochi, the Eight-Headed Dragon, which releases after the series.

== Episodes ==
1 Revival of the Giant
2 Great disaster
3 Journey to the world of the unknown
4 Girl of the oasis
5 Human of legend Mahoroba
6 Silence of Susanoo
7 Lion of the desert
8 The Space ship Amenoukihune
9 Strange rival
10 Stolen Susanoo!
11 Susanoo Retrieval
12 The Legendary Sword Kusanagi
13 Shivering of Demon God Aranoo
14 Soldier of Mystery Ouka
15 Susanoo crosses the sea
16 Sorrowful decision of Oto
17 Birth of the new Susannoo
18 Ouka's love filled sacrifice
19 Grapple machine death ring
20 Rule of Mizuho
21 Battle for Reputation and Glory
22 Amatsumi's trap
23 Last day of Mizuho
24 The sleeping people of the Moon
25 The Shaking Dragon Carrier
26 Earth citizens of the Moon World
27 Imprisonment of Kiriomi
28 Oto's secret
29 Boy of Mystery Kaon
30 Divine Bird Amanoshiratori
31 Discarded Shell of Orochi
32 Susano of the Yellow Spring Kingdom
33 Last ordeal
34 Battle of Yakumo
35 Intrusion! Dark Sky Carriage
36 Shining Wind Yamato Takeru
37 Everyone's Courage

=== After War (OVA) ===
1
2

== Music ==
- Osamu Tezuka and Vink (OST)
- Yutaka Gōda (music selection)

Theme Song Performances By:

Opening Theme:

- "RAIN" by Glay (eps 1–18)
- "Flower of Desert" by Naoko Hamasaki (eps 19–37)

Ending Theme:

- "RAIN" by Glay (eps 1–18)
- "Twilight Songs" by Naoko Hamasaki (eps 19–37)

== See also ==
- The Little Prince and the Eight-Headed Dragon
