= Mama Is Just a Fourth Grade Pupil =

1992 Japanese anime television series

- ママは小学4年生
- Genre: Science fiction
- Created by: Hajime Yatate
- Directed by: Shuji Iuchi (chief)
- Music by: Akira Senju; Hayato Kanbayashi; Michiaki Katō
- Opening theme: Ai o Purasu Wan by Hiromi Iwasaki
- Ending theme: Kono Ai o Mirai e by Hiromi Iwasaki
- Country of origin: Japan
- Original language: Japanese
- No. of episodes: 51

Production
- Producers: Shinichirō Maeda (NTV); Yūko Sagawa (Asatsu); Eiji Sashida (Sunrise)
- Production companies: Asatsu; Sunrise

Original release
- Network: NNS (NTV)
- Release: January 10 – December 25, 1992

Related
- Manga
- Written by: Ito Nakamori
- Published by: Shogakukan
- Original run: January 1992 – October 1992
- Volumes: 2

Mama is Just a Fourth Grade Pupil (Japanese: ママは小学4年生, Hepburn: Mama wa Shōgaku Yonensei; "Mama is a 4th Grader") is a Japanese anime television series directed by Shuji Iuchi and produced by Sunrise, Nippon Television and Asatsu. The 51-episode series was first aired from January 10, 1992, through December 25, 1992.

In 1993, Mama Is Just a Fourth Grade Pupil won the 24th Seiun Award in the Best Media category, and was ranked at number fifth in the 15th Anime Grand Prix award for Best Anime category.

This is a series about time travel. A baby mysteriously time travels from the year 2007 to the year 1992, where it is left in the care of Natsumi Mizuki, a past version of the baby's mother. Natsumi has to take care of her daughter, despite only being a 4th grader. Natsumi's own caretaker, her aunt Izumi Shimamura, is less than enthusiastic about the situation.

== Plot ==
In the year 2007, a woman is preparing for a party, while her husband is tinkering with a communication device for their new baby. A sudden lightning bolt affects the television, causing the baby to levitate and vanish. In the year 1992, a 4th grader named Natsumi Mizuki (水木 なつみ, Mizuki Natsumi) is separated from her parents for a day, because her father's company only bought two tickets for their move to England, so they had to buy her a ticket for the following day. She is upset because her parents gave away her pet dog. Her aunt Izumi Shimamura (島村 いづみ, Shimamura Izumi) (her mother's younger sister), an aspiring manga writer who hates dogs and babies, comes to live with Natsumi. They do not get along very well, with Natsumi calling her 'Oba-san' (Auntie) instead of 'Onee-san' (Big sis) as she would prefer.

While watching a movie, the baby appears in front of Natsumi. She becomes determined to raise the baby, not wanting to trust her with the clumsy policeman. Through the strange heart-shaped device, Natsumi and Izumi learn that the baby's mother is Natsumi Mizuki from the year 2007! She is a married 24-year-old, and pleads with her past self to take care of the baby until they can determine how to return her. The device is also linked with a clasp around the baby's neck that notifies Izumi when the baby needs her, through transmitting her emotional state.

Natsumi and Izumi continue to quarrel over how to raise the baby, and worry about time paradoxes that could occur. Natsumi must now try to raise her future daughter, attend school, and foil her aunt's attempts to foist the baby onto other caregivers. Izumi is pressured into watching the baby while Natsumi is at school, in exchange for free board, since she lost her apartment. During this time, she tries to focus on creating her manga without distractions.

== Reception ==
Mama Is Just a Fourth Grade Pupil received the 24th Seiun Award in the Best Media category. The series was ranked at number fifth in the 15th Anime Grand Prix award for Best Anime in 1993.
