= Dear Brother =

Japanese manga and anime

- Cover of the first manga volume

おにいさまへ… (Oniisama e...)
- Genre: Drama, slice of life
- Manga
- Written by: Riyoko Ikeda
- Published by: Shueisha
- Magazine: Margaret
- Original run: March 17, 1974 – September 22, 1974
- Volumes: 3
- Anime television series
- Directed by: Osamu Dezaki
- Produced by: Hirotaka Matsumoto; Masakazu Shioura
- Written by: Hideo Takayashiki; Tomoko Konparu
- Music by: Kentarō Haneda
- Studio: Tezuka Productions
- Licensed by: NA: Discotek Media
- Original network: NHK-BS2
- Original run: July 14, 1991 – May 31, 1992
- Episodes: 39
- icon

Dear Brother (Japanese: おにいさまへ…, Hepburn: Oniisama e...) is a Japanese manga series written and illustrated by Riyoko Ikeda. It was adapted into an anime series that aired on the channel NHK-BS2 from July 14, 1991, to May 31, 1992.

The series originally started out as a manga in the early to mid-1970s. The story is about a 16-year-old girl, Nanako Misonoo (御苑生奈々子, Misonoo Nanako), who attends a prestigious academy and deals with life as a high school student via writing letters to her "brother". The manga has been translated into French, Italian and Polish. The series spans 39 anime episodes and three manga volumes, ending when Nanako is eighteen.

== Plot ==
Nanako Misonoo is a young high school freshman at the exclusive girls' school Seiran Academy. When she begins her first year at this school, she falls into a world of female rivalry, love, chaos, and heartbreak. She narrates the story of the series in a chain of letters to a young man named Takehiko Henmi, who she calls "Oniisama" (Brother). In reality, Takehiko was her teacher at the cram school she went to earlier. She feels such a strong bond with Takehiko that she asks to continue corresponding with him. Takehiko agrees, and soon Nanako begins addressing him as "brother" in her letters. When Nanako starts her new school year at the all-girl Seiran Academy, she is unexpectedly inducted into the school's Sorority despite having none of the looks, talents, or background needed to become a member. As the series progresses, she becomes involved in the lives of the "Magnificent Three", the three most popular girls in the school.

As Nanako interacts with these ladies, she becomes attached to the great but troubled Rei Asaka, whom she wants to help, but cannot get close to due to Rei's obsession with Fukiko Ichinomiya, the Sorority president. Nanako also becomes friends with a beautiful and lonely young girl named Mariko Shinobu, who is determined to get into the Sorority and make Nanako her best friend at all costs. Meanwhile, Nanako has problems of her own; she is constantly being bullied by her peers due to her unlikely membership in the Sorority, especially by one Aya Misaki who feels that she should have been the one chosen for it. Throughout these problems Nanako is supported by her childhood friend Tomoko, the athletic but secretly ailing Kaoru Orihara, the passionate and troubled Mariko Shinobu and the correspondence with her "brother", who just happens to have some secrets of his own. The series chronicles her first year at Seiran Academy as she uncovers the past of some of the most popular girls in school, learning of love, loss, and her own family's secrets, including her true relationship with Takehiko.

== Characters ==
Nanako Misonoo (御苑生 奈々子, Misonoo Nanako)
Voiced by: Hiroko Kasahara (original series), Yūko Mizutani (television pilot)
The main character of the story, Nanako Misonoo is suddenly and unexpectedly chosen to join The Sorority, an elite group at her new high school, eliciting the wrath and jealousy of her classmates. Like many shōjo heroines, Nanako is innocent, caring, sometimes insecure, but always determined to do what is right. She begins the story hoping only to be liked by her peers, but is soon dragged into the lives and secrets of Seiran Academy's most elite students. She falls in love with Rei "Saint-Juste" Asaka, and their relationship is one of the major driving plots of the series.
Tomoko Arikura (有倉 智子, Arikura Tomoko)
Voiced by: Waka Kanda
Tomoko is Nanako's childhood friend and arguably the only "normal-themed" character in the series. In the manga, Mariko manipulates her into ending her friendship with Nanako, which Tomoko later rekindles when she realizes the misunderstanding. In the anime, Mariko attempts to end the friendship too and almost succeeds, but Tomoko ultimately remains by Nanako's side and protects her from Aya Misaki's bullying, and the three of them become best friends for the entire duration of the show, with Tomoko acting as the series' main comedic relief.
Rei Asaka ("Hana no Saint-Juste") (朝霞 れい, Asaka Rei)
Voiced by: Sumi Shimamoto
Rei "Saint-Juste of the Flowers" Asaka is a second year student and one of the "Magnificent Three" known for her social indifference and her many artistic talents, especially artistic (she plays the guitar and sings in the manga, and plays the piano, the flute and violin and acts in the anime). She is also shown playing basketball in the anime, replacing Kaoru in at least one game (Episode 16 "Comeback"). Incredibly loyal and devoted to the ones she loves, Rei's destructive relationship with Fukiko Ichinomiya leads her to be troubled, obsessed with death, and drug-addicted. She is Kaoru's best friend, with them exchanging playful insults at times and loyally helping each other at others, and shows a soft spot for Nanako when they interact, but her relationship with Fukiko prevents her from comfortably maintaining other friendships. The secrets between the two, and Nanako's involvement in them, is one of the major driving plots of the series. She dies late in the series; in the manga she dies by suicide via pill overdose, but in the anime her death is an accident as she falls off of a commuter bridge, into the path of a train (Episode 34 "Ablution"). She does this while trying to catch a bouquet of flowers that she purchased for Nanako, which she accidentally drops. In the anime her death deeply influences the other characters, as Kaoru begins to have suicidal feelings and the Ichinomiya family feel guilty for not doing anything for her, despite their wealth and their relationship to her. Ironically, Rei is the only one allowed, and who has ever seen Fukiko cry (Episode 25 "The Scarlet Lipstick"). Rei's nickname comes from Louis de Saint-Just, a French Revolutionary, known as the "Angel of Death".
Mariko Shinobu (信夫 マリ子, Shinobu Mariko)
Voiced by: Sakiko Tamagawa
Nanako's classmate, a fellow Sorority member and a former student of the junior high school attached to Seiran, Mariko becomes one of Nanako's best friends. Mariko distrusts all men because of her troubled family life: her father Hikawa is an erotica author who has an affair with an actress and later divorces Mariko's mother Hisako, who keeps her sadness bottled up as she raises Mariko practically on her own. As a result she is terrified of abandonment to the point where she becomes obsessed with the ones around her. She is also extremely beautiful, with red lips and long black hair as well as a curvy body, and shows an odd mix of vanity about her good looks and lack of regard for her own health if upset. On one occasion, Mariko becomes extremely possessive towards Nanako when Nanako tries to leave the Shinobu Residence. This later leads to Mariko refusing to eat until Nanako accepts her apology and forgives her. She collapses after three days due to hunger, before returning to eating as normal once the two friends have resolved the situation.. Mariko greatly admires Kaoru due to her strength and the emotional support she gives her as well, and at some point she admits to loving Karou (Episode 16"Comeback"). She also has odd interactions with Fukiko's brother Takashi, especially in the anime where she comically insults him (Episode 21). Almost at the end, Mariko injures Aya after Aya makes fun of her family problems in front of the class, leading Mariko to be suspended from school and expelled from the Sorority, which partially triggers the call for the Sorority to be abolished after Nanako declares that Fukiko's judgement on Mariko was too harsh, as she did not hear Mariko's side of the story. In the anime Mariko eventually comes to terms with her rivalry with Aya, realising they were both lonely and self-centred.
Near the end of the series, Mariko's parents finally divorce. At first Mariko is extremely distraught, and reminisces about how her father was never there for her on her birthday, and Nanako observes how difficult it must be for her to choose a parent to live with as she loves both of them deeply. Furthermore, she feels shame about her father's profession deepens her self-loathing. After the incident with Aya and Mariko's expulsion from the Sorority, her father tells her that he believes there is good in everyone, including himself and Mariko, so she should love herself. She is able to resolve her feelings of shame towards her father's profession when Takashi hands her an old novel by her father, which is a sincere novel about his love towards his mother and his belief to live life in a way that will not be regretted.
Kaoru Orihara ("Kaoru-no-kimi") (折原 薫, Orihara Kaoru)
Voiced by: Keiko Toda
"Kaoru-no-Kimi" ("Prince Kaoru") Orihara is one of the "Magnificent Three", the class representative of Nanako and her friend's class and the star of the basketball team, known for her tomboyish way of dress and her great athletic skills. She has a mysterious and deadly illness (breast cancer) kept secret from most of her classmates; it's only known in public that she was held back a year due to unnamed health problems. As Rei's best friend, she greatly dislikes Fukiko for everything she has done to Rei and hates the very existence of the Sorority. She spends the series trying to live her life to the fullest in spite of her disease, and is the one who supports Nanako the most when she is bullied, and helps Rei when she gets into major trouble. She was romantically involved with Nanako's "brother", Takehiko Henmi, but broke it off after her mastectomy. However, both Kaoru and Takehiko still have strong feelings for each other near the end of the series. Fukiko, who is also in love with Takehiko, encourages Kaoru to take up their relationship again after Rei's death, pointing out that Rei lived her life to the fullest until the last day, so she should too. In both anime and manga Kaoru marries Takehiko and emigrates to Germany with him. In the anime, she recovers from her cancer and gives birth to a child at the end of the series, but in the manga she dies two years after she and Takehiko leave. Kaoru's nickname comes from the anti-hero character, Kaoru Genji, of The Tale of Genji.
Fukiko Ichinomiya ("Miya-sama") (一の宮 蕗子, Ichinomiya Fukiko)
Voiced by: Mami Koyama
One of the "Magnificent Three", Fukiko "Miya-sama" ("Princess") Ichinomiya is a senior year student, the Student Council President, leader of the Sorority Club, member of the flower arrangement and horse riding club, and known for her elegance and dignity. She appears to be calm and generous, but is cruel and manipulative, often psychologically and physically torturing Rei for several ambiguous reasons, such as her desire that Rei should only have eyes for her and no one else. It is also revealed that she and Rei are full sisters, daughters of the Ichinomiya leader and a maid of the family mansion, although she was adopted by the Ichinomiya family and Rei was not. The annual Sorority candidate selections always cause extreme fighting and jealousy among the lower-classmen, which she promotes, believing that in competition one finds strength, so Fukiko sponsors Nanako's entry into the Sorority due to secret and ulterior motives: she is in love with Takehiko, does not know that Takehiko is really Nanako's stepbrother and confidant, and sees Nanako as a potential obstacle. She jealously tries to destroy their relationship by making Nanako love her instead (she believes that Nanako is writing to Hemni with romantic intentions and tries to make her stop writing him letters). In the anime, her love for Takehiko is given a backstory: she met and fell in love with him when she was twelve and he spent several days with her in the Ichinomiya mansion, but he unknowingly broke her heart by not showing up to her birthday party, which she had prepared a violin piece for, which emotionally splintered young Fukiko; Fukiko has since been stuck in that sense of love that she felt when she was twelve. Her room from that period remains the same as it was on the very day that she met Henmi (Episode 22 "A Summer Serenade"). In the end, she is able to overcome her childhood love and move forward, and in the anime she greatly laments Rei's death.
Aya Misaki (三咲 綾, Misaki Aya)
Voiced by: Masako Katsuki
The daughter of a famous lawyer, a fervent (her mother was in the sorority so it would shame the family if she were not chosen) Sorority aspirant and Mariko's rival ever since junior high, she tries to make life miserable for Nanako and Mariko when she fails to gain entry. In the anime, she is almost always seen with Miyuki Sonobe and Megumi Furuta, the only friends she seems to have at Seiran Academy. Mean-spirited and conniving, her cruelty belies an intense self-loathing. In the anime, after she is wounded in an altercation with Mariko in Episode 27, "An Incident of Bloodshed", she experiences intense guilt for her actions and ultimately repents. When Megumi and Miyuki are manipulated by older Sorority girls, Aya takes the blame to protect her friends and later attempts to commit suicide by throwing herself into the sea, but is saved by Nanako and her friends. By the series' end, she and her group appear to be on good terms with the main characters.
Takehiko Henmi ("Oniisama") (辺見 武彦, Henmi Takehiko)
Voiced by: Tesshō Genda
Takehiko is a favourite tutor of Nanako, whom she asks to be her "Oniisama"—a trusted older-brother figure. He is a graduate student at Gakuin University along with Fukiko's brother Takashi Ichinomiya, and has aspirations to study abroad in Germany. Takehiko is actually Nanako's stepbrother, the son of Mr. Misonoo's first marriage, though he keeps this secret from Nanako so as not to air the family's dirty laundry in a society that still looks down on divorce. He was involved with Kaoru approximately two years prior to the series' start, though after she was diagnosed she ended their relationship so neither of them would suffer. He is acquainted with the Ichinomiya family through his best friend, Takashi. He appears to know of the situation with Rei, though if this information was revealed through Kaoru or Takashi is not stated. By the end of the series he rekindles his relationship with his father and marries Kaoru, before moving to Germany.
Takashi Ichinomiya (一の宮 貴, Ichinomiya Takashi)
Voiced by: Kenyū Horiuchi
Takashi is introduced as a friend of Takehiko, and is often seen accompanying him. Takashi is good-natured and caring, showing considerable interest in the well-being of his younger sisters and especially the troubled Rei. Takashi is incredibly supportive of Takehiko, frequently driving him around and going so far as to plan and pay for his friend's entire wedding at the show's conclusion. It is hinted that he has a strained relationship with his father. He also seems to be impressed by Mariko's fiery personality (though his reactions are mixed in the anime), and supports her when she runs off after attacking Aya.
Miyuki Sonobe
Voiced by: Yumi Takada
An anime-exclusive character, introduced as one of Aya Misaki's two friends. She has pigtails and hair decorations, and is almost never seen without either Aya or their common friend Megumi Furuta. She and Megumi are seen as few more than Aya's girl posse, supporting her bullying of Nanako and Mariko. In episode 27, it's revealed that she and Megumi actually do care for Aya's well-being instead of just liking her high status; this leads Komabayashi and Ogiwara to manipulate them both for their benefit
Megumi Furuta
Voiced by: Miki Itou
An anime-exclusive character, of Aya Misaki's other friend. She has short hair and a deep voice, and is almost never seen without either Aya or Miyuki. She and Miyuki are seen as few more than Aya's girl posse, supporting her bullying of Nanako and Mariko. Like Miyuki, her motivations (misguided but genuine affection for Aya) are revealed in episode 27.
Junko Nakaya
Voiced by: Mayumi Setou

A girl from another first-year classroom, was chosen to be in the Sorority alongside Mariko and Nanako. She becomes the first member of the Sorority who is expelled from it due to her bad grades, despite having a reasonable excuse (her bad health); Fukiko further humiliates her by exposing her case to everyone in the Sorority and then demanding for her to resign, despite Nanako's objections. She ultimately does so, and later confesses to Nanako that she had begun to feel uncomfortable in the Sorority itself. In the anime she is given some more spotlight, as she is introduced via speaking to a friend about Nanako's qualifications to be in the Sorority, which angers Mariko; few later, she rejoins the cast and befriends Nanako more properly. Later in the series, she returns to support to motion to abolish the sorority.

Mr. and Mrs. Misonoo
Voiced by: Hiroko Suzuki (Mrs. Misonoo), Kinryū Arimoto (Professor Misonoo)

Nanako's parents, or more exactly, Nanako's mother and stepfather. Mr. Misonoo, a well-known and respected college professor, was formerly married to Takehiko Henmi's mother, and after a divorce, he took to drinking his sorrows away; Nanako's mother was the waitress of the pub that he attended the most, and once the professor became sober, they fell in love and got married. Ever since then Professor Misonoo has been a father figure to Nanako, though he was not able to rekindle his bonds to Takehiko as well; he and his new wife still worked to both be able to support themselves and help Takehiko after his mother's death. When Nanako is chosen as a Sorority member, one of the reasons she was questioned the most for was the assumption that her mother was a homewrecker, which was false.

Hisako and Hikawa Shinobu
Voiced by: Rihoko Yoshida (Hisako), Tomomichi Nishimura (Hikawa)

Mariko Shinobu's parents. Hikawa Shinobu is a rich and popular erotica writer, and his work is used by Aya and her group to bully Mariko at school; not to mention, his affair with an ex-actress is very well known, as well as the reason why Mariko hates men of all kinds. Hisako attempts to take care of Mariko as much as she can while ignoring her own troubles, but while Mariko loves her deeply, her forceful personality sometimes is too much to handle. In the manga, Hikawa never made proper apparitions; in the anime, however, he and his mistress show up in person.

=== The Sorority ===
The Seiran Sorority is an amalgamation of a student government, an extracurricular club, and an elite society, and is a school tradition that is said to date back to at least the 1930s. Similar to western fraternities and sororities, prospective members seem to be nominated by those already in the Sorority, and undergo a pledge period in which they are interviewed for fitness. Family legacy, appropriate extracurricular activities, and attractive appearances are the main considerations for admission. The Sorority appears to have around forty or fifty members, though several of the senior members are given prominence and special nicknames. They are primarily referred to by these nicknames, though later in the series their surnames are revealed. Their given names were never shown.

"Lady Borgia" Ogiwara
Voiced by: Emi Shinohara
Borgia is a senior member of the Sorority, and is commonly seen wearing her hair in a chignon. Her position in the Sorority is never expressly stated. During the Petition Arc, she is presented as the most adamant member of the plot to discredit Fukiko, with intentions of taking over as President, herself. She holds a strong dislike of Fukiko and shows frustration with the other girl's staunch pride.
"Lady Mona Lisa" Komabayashi
Voiced by: Shinobu Adachi
Mona Lisa is a senior member of the Sorority, and resembles her namesake, possessing long black hair and an enigmatic expression. She is stated as being the Sorority's Vice-President and a good friend of Ogiwara. Reserved and mysterious, she is quite invested in the Sorority. She eventually goes along with the other members during the Petition Arc, though contests Borgia when she realizes their machinations have gone too far.
"Lady Medusa" Katsuragi
Voiced by: Kumiko Takizawa
Medusa is a senior member of the Sorority, and briefly serves as Vice-President after Mona Lisa's resignation. She has bushy brown hair. She appears to be Fukiko's only friend within the Sorority; the two are often seen conversing pleasantly, and during the Petition Arc she is the last member to remain on Fukiko's side.
"Lady Cattleya" Yamamoto
Voiced by: Satoko Yasunaga
Cattleya is a senior member of the Sorority, and has curly brown hair with side-swept bangs. Cattleya plays a role in the conspiracy to discredit Fukiko, though she pulls out when Borgia's schemes prove too ridiculous. She seems fairly kind, and willingly helps Nanako with the petition after resigning.
"Lady Vampanella" Hoshino
Voiced by: Miyuki Matsuoka
Vampanella is a senior Sorority member, and wears her dark hair in a ponytail with a bow. She appears close with Cattleya; the two both abandon Borgia to her schemes during the Petition Arc. She is seen to be a smoker outside of school.

== Themes ==
The show's themes revolve around suicide, incest, lesbianism, drug addiction, violence, divorce, and disease. Rei Asaka has a deep love for Fukiko Ichinomiya which can be seen as incestuous due to later revelations about their actual relationship and early interactions with each other. Lesbianism is mentioned due to heavy overtones of female interaction at an all girls school, as well as Nanako's romantic feelings towards Rei, and Mariko's feelings towards Kaoru.

== Media ==
=== Manga ===
1. Sorority Member Senkou (ソロリティ・メンバー選考, Sorority Member Senkou) August 20, 1978
2. Saint Juste no Himitsu (サン・ジュストの秘密) September 20, 1978
3. Sayonara Kaoru no Kimi (さよなら薫の君) October 20, 1978

=== Anime ===
The series was dubbed and released in Italy, Spain, Arabia and France, though it was pulled after seven episodes in France, due to strong adult content. A Greek version is also known to have existed, with its broadcast halted between the commercial breaks in the third episode. The anime series is available online to viewers in the United States through Viki.com, Hulu, and YouTube. Anime Sols has successfully crowdfunded the entire the show for North American DVD. Under the title Dear Brother, three DVD box sets were released between July 29, 2014, and April 7, 2015. RetroCrush started streaming in United States and Canada from October, 2020 via streaming app and website under the title Dear Brother. Discotek Media has re-licensed the series.

== Reception ==
Lynzee Loveridge of Anime News Network noted that in the series "everyone's off their rockers and has beautiful clothes" and called the Seiran Academy's Sorority "relentless" and slighting anyone who is not "perfect". Erica Friedman of Okazu described the series as "extraordinarily dark" and centered around one person: Ichinomiya Fukiko. Carlos Ross of THEM Anime Reviews said that the series is not known in the United States, but the subject matter, the "cruel machinations of high-school age girls" is treated frankly in this "character-driven story". Ross did say that some newcomers to the series may not like the enka which "might be a bit slow and plaintive for Western ears", while saying the music is appropriate, and noted that the series has a "reputation...for having lesbian overtones", adding that the anime is a "classic".
