= Madö King Granzört =

Japanese anime television series

- 魔動王(マドーキング)グランゾート
- Genre: Adventure, Mecha
- Created by: Hajime Yatate; Ōji Hiroi
- Directed by: Shūji Iuchi (chief)
- Music by: Kōhei Tanaka
- Country of origin: Japan
- Original language: Japanese
- No. of episodes: 41

Production
- Producers: Hibiki Ito (NTV); Yuko Sagawa (Asatsu); Takayuki Yoshii (Sunrise); Tamiyuki Tomita (Sunrise)
- Editor: Yumiko Fuse
- Production companies: Asatsu; Sunrise

Original release
- Network: NNS (NTV)
- Release: April 7, 1989 – March 2, 1990

Related
- Original video animation

The Last Magical War
- Directed by: Shūji Iuchi
- Written by: Shūji Iuchi
- Music by: Kōhei Tanaka
- Studio: Sunrise
- Released: August 10, 1990 – September 8, 1990
- Runtime: 30 minutes (each)
- Episodes: 2
- Original video animation

Non-Stop Rabi
- Directed by: Nobuhiro Kondo
- Written by: Shūji Iuchi
- Music by: Kōhei Tanaka
- Studio: Sunrise
- Released: August 16, 1990
- Runtime: 30 minutes
- Original video animation

An Adventure Story
- Directed by: Nobuhiro Kondo
- Written by: Ryota Yamaguchi
- Music by: Kōhei Tanaka
- Studio: Sunrise
- Released: March 27, 1992 – June 26, 1992
- Runtime: 30 minutes (each)
- Episodes: 3

Madö King Granzört (Japanese: 魔動王(マドーキング)グランゾート, Hepburn: Madō Kingu Guranzōto) is a Japanese mecha animated series produced by Sunrise, created by Ōji Hiroi (Sakura Wars, Far East of Eden) and directed by Shūji Iuchi. It aired on NTV from April 7, 1989, to March 2, 1990. It spawned three special direct-to-video episodes and two Original Video Animation movies, as well as a video game for the PC Engine SuperGrafx. Unlike Mashin Hero Wataru, the series uses both Jewish and gnostic terminology, particularly the Kabbalah.

== Plot ==
In 2050, the moon was mysteriously terraformed after a great moonquake, giving it Earth-like gravity and breathable air. In 2100, fifty years later, the moon is now populated with humans and has become a popular tourist destination. After a boy named Daichi arrives on the moon for summer vacation, he accidentally meets an old witch, V-Mei, and her granddaughter Guri Guri. Both of them are members of the endangered Long-Ears race, currently at war with the evil Jadou Clan, who are also planning to take over Earth. V-Mei gives a magic gun to Daichi and reveals that he is the chosen Madö Warrior destined to save the Long-Ears race and their land Rabiluna from the Jadou Clan.

With the magic gun, Daichi can summon Granzort, a giant robot called a Madö King with the elemental power of Earth, to fight against the monsters of the Jadou Clan. During their travels, Daichi, V-Mei, and Guri Guri are later joined by two other Madö Warriors, Gus and Rabi. Gus's magic bow summons Winzart, the Madö King of Wind, while Rabi's magic top summons Aquabeat, the Madö King of Water.
