= Heihachi =

Heihachi may refer to:

- Heihachi Edajima, a character in Sakigake!! Otokojuku
- Heihachi Hayashida, a character in the Akira Kurosawa film Seven Samurai
- Heihachi Mishima, a main character in the Tekken video game series
- Heihachi, a character in the Takashi Miike film Sukiyaki Western Django
