= Ken Yamaguchi =

Japanese actor and narrator (1956–2011)

- 山口 健
- Born: Kiyoshige Yamaguchi; March 24, 1956; Tokyo, Japan
- Died: October 24, 2011 (aged 55)
- Occupations: Actor; voice actor; narrator
- Years active: 1977–2011
- Agent: OYS Produce
- Children: Kiyohiro Yamaguchi

Ken Yamaguchi (山口 健, Yamaguchi Ken; March 24, 1956 – October 24, 2011) was a Japanese actor, voice actor and narrator affiliated with OYS Produce. His son, Kiyohiro Yamaguchi (山口キヨヒロ, Yamaguchi Kiyohiro), is also a voice actor.

He is most known for the roles of Ashuraman, The Omegaman, Prisman in Kinnikuman: Scramble for the Throne, Genji Togashi in Sakigake!! Otokojuku, Flazzard in Dragon Quest: Dai's Great Adventure, Black Dragon in Saint Seiya, and Ein in Fist of the North Star.

== Death ==
Yamaguchi died of acute heart failure on October 24, 2011, at the age of 55.

== Filmography ==
=== Television animation ===
- Sakigake!! Otokojuku (1988) (Genji Togashi)
- Zatch Bell! (2003) (Hosokawa, Nakata-sensei)
- Black Lagoon (2006) (Ibraha)
- Lemon Angel Project (2006) (Danny Yamaguchi)
- Sgt. Frog (2006) (Merosu Seijin)

Unknown date

- Kinnikuman: Scramble for the Throne (Ashuraman, Prisman (First), The Omegaman)
- Yaiba (Snakeman)
- La Blue Girl (King Seikima, Narrator, Ninja)
- Warrior of Love Rainbowman (Gota Yamada)
- Fist of the North Star 2 (Ein)
- Adventure Kid (Officer)
- Saint Seiya (Black Dragon, Tarantula Arachne)
- The Transformers 2010 (Blurr)
- Tatakae!! Ramenman (Ryuseiken Hogan)
- Digimon Savers (MetalPhantomon)
- Dragon Quest: Dai's Great Adventure (Flazzard)
- Dragon Ball Z (Raspberry)
- Urotsukidoji (Munchausen, Monk, D-9, Ellis's Father)
- Violence Jack (Aids, Gokumon)
- Sonic X (Decoe, Nelson Thorndyke)
- Dragon Ball GT (Si Xing Long)
- Himitsu no Akko-chan (3rd series) (Papa)
- Yokoyama Mitsuteru Sangokushi (Pang Tong)
- Last Exile (Walker, Greyhound)
- Machine Robo: Battle Hackers (Gakurandar)
- Marmalade Boy (Takuji Kijima)
- Melody of Oblivion (Child Dragon)
- Miracle Girls (Shinichiro Kageura)
- Oku-sama wa Mahō Shōjo: Bewitched Agnes (Koichi Shioya)
- Monster (Iwai)
- Magical Doremi (Shingo Hasegawa's Father)
- Legend of the Galactic Heroes (Vargenzile)
- Street Fighter Zero The Animation (Gouken)
- Hyper Doll (Detective Todo)

=== Tokusatsu ===
- Hikari Sentai Maskman (1987) (Cabira Doggler)
- Kousoku Sentai Turboranger (1989) (Picture Book Boma)
- Choujin Sentai Jetman (1991) (Vacuum Cleaner Jigen)

=== Dubbing ===
- Buffalo Bill and the Indians, or Sitting Bull's History Lesson (1981 TV Asahi edition) (Ed Goodman (Harvey Keitel))
- Indiana Jones and the Last Crusade (Young Indiana Jones (River Phoenix))
