= Masahiro Anzai =

Japanese voice actor (1954–2021)

- Born: 26 November 1954; Tokyo, Japan
- Died: 15 March 2021 (aged 66)
- Occupation: Voice actor

Masahiro Anzai (Japanese: 安西正弘; Anzai Masahiro) (26 November 1954 – 15 March 2021) was a Japanese voice actor and actor.

== Biography ==
Anzai graduated from the Nihon University College of Art. He retired from acting in 1997 due to his treatment for diabetes, which caused his lower left leg to be amputated and blindness in the eye. He died of acute heart failure on 15 March 2021.

== Filmography ==
=== Television animation ===
- Urusei Yatsura (1982–1986), Ryunosuke's father
- Creamy Mami, the Magic Angel (1983–1984), Midori Kisaragi
- Sakigake!! Otokojuku (1988), Dokugantetsu, Mick Kong, other roles
- The Jungle Book (1989), Bacchus
- Brave Exkaiser (1990–1991), Mario
- Genji Tsūshin Agedama (1991–1992), Ebiten, The owner of Ganko-Tei
- Sangokushi (1991–1992), Dian Wei
- Sailor Moon (1992), Rhett Butler
- Yadamon (1992–1993), Butch
- Yamato Takeru (1994), Ouka
- Bonobono (1995–1996), Beaver-san
- Romeo's Blue Skies (1995), Marchelo Rossi
- Slayers (1995–1997) Philionel El Di Seyruun (Season 1 and 2 only)

=== Original video animation (OVA) ===
- Birth (1984), Inorganic Biker Kid/Kooni
- Twilight Q - part 1 (1987), Uemura
- Zillion: Burning Night (1988), Nabaro
- Crows (1994), Genjirō Katsuragi

=== Theatrical animation ===
- Urusei Yatsura 2: Beautiful Dreamer (1984)
- Urusei Yatsura 3: Remember My Love (1985)
- Wings of Honnêamise (1987), Majaho
- Urusei Yatsura 5: The Final Chapter (1988)
- Urusei Yatsura 6: Always My Darling (1991)

=== Tokusatsu ===
- Dengeki Sentai Changeman (1985), Dodon

=== Dubbing ===
==== Live-action ====
- Dangerous Minds, Hal Griffith (George Dzundza)
- Friends, Jack Geller (Elliott Gould)
- Léon: The Professional, Mathilda's Father (Michael Badalucco)
- Loaded Weapon 1, Rick Becker (Jon Lovitz)
- Pee-wee's Big Adventure, Francis Buxton (Mark Holton)
- Sneakers, Darren Roskow (Dan Aykroyd)

==== Animation ====
- Thumbelina, Grundel
