= List of Brave Exkaiser characters =

The main protagonists of Brave Exkaiser, the 1990-to-1991 first entry in the 90s-begun Brave (勇者, Yūsha) franchise co-created by manufacturer Takara and animation studio Sunrise, are humans and mechanical beings from the planet Kaiser Star. They face off against evil mechanical space pirates known as Geisters, who are wanted criminals and seek the treasures on Earth.

== Hoshikawa Family ==
The Hoshikawas (星川) are:

=== Siblings ===
- Kouta (コウタ, Kōta): Voiced by Kumiko Watanabe

Student of Asahi-Dai Elementary School 3rd Grade Class B. He acts as a member of Kaisers starting with having witnessed Exkaiser in garage in his house. he can talk with Exkaiser even in the faraway place through the communication machine of "Kaiser Brace". He also likes sports, as he wants to be a baseball player and join soccer club.

- Fuuko (フーコ, Fūko): Voiced by Chie Kōjiro

Elder sister of Kouta. She is a quick and very active girl.

=== Parents ===
- Jinichi (ジンイチ, Hosikawa Jinichi): Voiced by Tomomichi Nishimura

The father. He is the editor-in-chief of Tōto Newspaper. He has strong journalism ethics, yet he still prioritizes family although work stresses him out (hence berating Tokuda). He is also a smoker.

- Yoko (星川 ヨーコ, Hosikawa Yōko): Voiced by Ai Sato

The mother. She is rarely surprised or frightened unless directly provoked.

=== Others ===
- Mario (マリオ): Voiced by Masahiro Anzai → Naoki Makishima

The pet Chow Chow's crossbreed of the Hoshikawa family. Only he is another friend of Exkaiser alongside Kouta.

=== Friends and Allies ===
- Kotomi Tsukiyama (月山 コトミ, Tsukiyama Kotomi): Voiced by Chisa Yokoyama

Kouta's girlfriend. A sweet and kind girl that lives with her older brother, Sho. The Hoshikawa Family is very friendly with her.

- Takumi Kaneari (金有 タクミ, Kaneari Takumi): Voiced by Chiaki Morita

Kouta's classmate. His parents are rich and he often likes to show off their luxury. He is also a selfish coward who tries to woo Kotomi.

- Osamu Tokuda (徳田 オサム, Tokuda Osamu): Voiced by Koichi Yamadera

Journalist for Tōto. He and Jinichi have the relation like the family. He is very determined for a good scoop, but his own stupidity and luck backfire on him.

- The Reporter (レポーター, Repota):

A female news reporter for Kanto TV who appears throughout the series, often beating Osamu to big stories. Dino Geist often uses her reports for plotting his schemes. Near the end of the series her first name is revealed to be Katsuki (勝木).

== Space Police Kaisers ==
The Space Police Kaiser(s) (宇宙警察カイザー(ズ), Uchū Keisatsu Kaizā(zu)) are mechanical energy beings that came from the planet Kaiser Star. All average ages are 12,000 years old which is about 20 years old in the terrestrial age.

=== Exkaiser ===
Exkaiser (エクスカイザー, Ekusukaizā): (Voiced by Sho Hayami) : Leader of the Space Police Kaisers who assimilates a sports car which is privately owned by the Hoshikawas on Earth. Only Kouta and Mario are friends with Exkaiser so that his presence on Earth can stay hidden from family, friends and other civilians. His powered up transformation exchanges the normal appearance of his chestplate for a lion's head motif. His weapons and abilities are:

- Weapons
  - Spike Cutter
  - Jet Boomerang
  - Photon Ring
- Abilities
  - Impact Crash
  - Flaming Nova
  - Breast Beam

==== Auxiliary units ====
- King Roader (キングローダー, Kingu Rōdā): A carrier vehicle that transforms into a flight mode or into a trailer that can be pulled by Exkaiser's car transformation.
- Dragon Jet (ドラゴンジェット, Doragon Jetto): A jet that can transform into a trailer that may be pulled by Exkaiser's car disguise, or into a seldom used face-less humanoid form known as Dragon (ドラゴン, Doragon).

==== Combinations ====
- King Exkaiser (キングエクスカイザー, Kingu Ekusukaizā): (Voiced by Sho Hayami) : Exkaiser's first Gigantic Combination (巨大合体, Kyodai Gattai) - for this combination, he is combining with King Roader. His powers, abilities and weapons include Kaiser Sword (カイザーソード, Kaizā Sōdo), Kaiser Shot, Kaiser Wing Blade, Kaiser Flame, Kaiser Beam, Kaiser Blaster, and the Thunder Flash (サンダーフラッシュ, Sandā Furasshu) finisher.
- Dragon Kaiser (ドラゴンカイザー, Doragon Kaizā): (Voiced by Sho Hayami) : Exkaiser's second Gigantic Combination when he combines this time with Dragon Jet. His weapons and abilities are Dragon Archery (ドラゴンアーチェリー, Doragon Ācherī), Dragon Shooter, Dragon Anchor, Dragon Boomerang, Dragon Tonfa, Dragon Blaster, Dragon Cannon, Archery Sword, Rocket Blaster, Dragon Beam, Dragon Thunder, and the Thunder Arrow (サンダーアロー, Sandā Arō) finisher.
- Great Exkaiser (グレートエクスカイザー, Gurēto Ekusukaizā): (Voiced by Sho Hayami) : This combination is formed when Exkaiser combines with both of his auxiliary mecha, King Loader and the Dragon Jet, simultaneously through Super Giant Combination (超巨大合体, Chō Kyodai Gattai) When he uses his new and improved Kaiser Sword (combined with the Dragon Archery), he can initiate his Thunder Crash (サンダークラッシュ, Sandā Kurasshu) finisher. Other attacks include: Great Flame, Great Flasher, Great Tomahawk, Great Cannon, Great Blaster, and Great Thunder

=== Max Team (マックスチーム, Makkusu Chīmu) ===
- God Max (ゴッドマックス, Goddo Makkusu) : (Voiced by Daiki Nakamura) : The Three-Piece Combination (三体合体, Santai Gattai) of the Max Team. His weapons and abilities are Flying Bird Bomb, God Slicer, God Slugger, Slicer Wing, Jet Booster Punch, God Cosmic Bomber, God Bird Attack and God Sonic Buster attacks.
  - Sky Max (スカイマックス, Sukai Makkusu): (Voiced by Daiki Nakamura) : The leader of the Max Team. He uses a fighter jet (McDonnell Douglas F-15 Eagle) for his disguise. His powered up transformation exchanges the normal appearance of his chestplate for an eagle's head motif.
  - Dash Max (ダッシュマックス, Dasshu Makkusu): (Voiced by Mitsuaki Hoshino) : He uses a six-wheeled car for his disguise. His powered up transformation exchanges the normal appearance of his chestplate for a turbine.
  - Drill Max (ドリルマックス, Doriru Makkusu): (Voiced by Kozo Shioya) : He uses a twin-drill tank for his disguise. His powered up transformation exchanges the normal appearance of his chestplate for a pair of Gatling cannons.

=== Raker Brothers (レイカーブラザーズ, Reikā Burazāzu) ===
They were originally designed for Transformers, but that had already "phased out" after Zone. Both Brothers can use the Bind Crush (バインドクラッシュ, Baindo Kurasshu) ability

- Ultra Raker (ウルトラレイカー, Urutora Reikā): (Voiced by Masami Kikuchi) : The Lateral Combination (左右合体, Sayū Gattai) of the Raker Brothers, wherein each brother forms a full half of the combination. His weapons and abilities include the Ultra Double Chain Crusher, Ultra Shoulder Crush, Ultra Cannon Beam, and Ultra Kick. His name is sometimes translated as Raicer or Laker. Raicer is spelled in the Japanese official site. Raker is translated in English.
  - Blue Raker (ブルーレイカー, Burū Reikā): (Voiced by Masami Kikuchi) : He is the elder Raker Brother and uses a 100 Series Shinkansen for his disguise.
  - Green Raker (グリーンレイカー, Gurīn Reikā) : (Voiced by Takeshi Kusao) : He is the younger Raker Brother and uses a 200 Series Type 2000 Shinkansen for his disguise.

== Geisters ==
The Space Pirate Geister(s) (宇宙海賊ガイスター(ズ), Uchū Kaizoku Gaisutā(zu)) are the antagonist energy life-forms who pit their fused monsters of the day against the Kaisers. They are 3 centuries old and ravaged their home world fourteen years after their birth looking for a wide variety of treasures across space to take for themselves. Upon their arrival on Earth, they use dinosaurs for their physical bodies' transformations.

- Dino Geist (ダイノガイスト, Daino Gaisuto): (Voiced by Shozo Iizuka) : Leader of the Geisters. His transformations from humanoid are a tyrannosaurus-like dinosaur which, for a few episodes, he is in as he remains at base and a jet for self-transportation. He faces Great Exkaiser in a final climactic battle on the moon. While each proves near equals, Exkaiser manages to overpower him. However, instead of allowing himself to be defeated and captured by Exkaiser, he chooses to commit suicide by flying into the sun and thus destroy himself while Exkaiser could only witness this unexpected self-sacrifice that Dino Geist performs for the purpose of avoiding arrest.
- Koumori (蝙蝠, Kōmori) (Lit. bat): (Voiced by Issei Futamata): Dino Geist's messenger who gives messages to the other Geisters.
- Horn Geist (ホーンガイスト, Hōn Gaisuto): (Voiced by Daisuke Gori) : A triceratops who serves as the strategic planner and is the leader of the other Geisters only after Dino Geist. Based on Slag from Transformers Generation 1.
- Armor Geist (アーマーガイスト, Āmā Gaisuto): (Voiced by Tomomichi Nishimura) : A stegosaurus who serves as the demolition expert and has the most ranged weapons of the Geisters after Dino Geist. Based on Snarl from Transformers Generation 1.
- Ptera Geist (プテラガイスト, Putera Gaisuto): (Voiced by Jurota Kosugi) : A pteranodon who serves as the intelligence collector and is the smartest of the Geisters. Based on Swoop from Transformers Generation 1.
- Thunder Geist (サンダーガイスト, Sandā Gaisuto): (Voiced by Masahiro Anzai → Naoki Makishima) : An apatosaurus who serves as the headstrong muscle and is the second physically strongest Geister only after Dino Geist. Based on Sludge from Transformers Generation 1.
  - Mad Geister (マッドガイスター, Maddo Gaisutā): The combination of Ptera, Horn, Armor and Thunder Geists born when Ptera uses a special device on himself and the others which merges them. This special team transformation only appears in episode 32. Due to the participants' clashing personalities and bickering, this combination ultimately fails to act properly.
  - Hormor (ホーマー, Hōmā): The combination of Horn and Armor Geists. Only appears in episodes 40 and 48.
  - Pteder (プテダー, Putedā): The combination of Ptera and Thunder Geists that resembles a winged centaur. Only appears in episodes 33, 40, and 48.
- Trader (トレーダー, Torēdā): A cowardly space merchant of the galactic black market who buys stolen treasures from the Geisters. In his first appearance he uses a camera as his physical body with his other appearances using a television and a barrel.

=== Geister Robos ===
Created by bug-like Geister-energy-bearing Energy Boxes grabbing hold to and transforming something, these robos assist the Geisters to either steal treasures or serve as a distraction for the Kaisers. Unlike their creators, none of them appear in either Brave Saga title.

- Hashida: Appears in episode 2. Powers include high jumping and a mouth energy ray.
- Tetton: Appear in episode 3. Powers include a mouth energy ray and fusing into a 200-meter tetton.
- Tettora: Appears in episode 3. Powers include grapple tentacles and self-destructing its nuclear core.
- Hassha: Appears in episode 4. Powers include a 6-tube missile pod for each palm, tank treads, and clawed toes.
- Ikatank: Appears in episode 5. Powers include twelve constricting tentacles and a giant shovel claw.
- Todain: Appears in episode 6. Powers include four extendable claw arms and swimming.
- Star Lander: Appears in episode 7. Powers include strength, explosive coffee cups, a hose nose, and transforming into a giant formula 1 race car. It is the combination of:
  - Octopa Robo: Powers include six whip-like tentacles, and a nose hose.
  - Roller Coaster Robo: Powers include three lasers from its head and a whip-like tail.
  - Ferris Wheel Robo: Powers include strength and rolling.
  - Mirror House Robo: Powers include a solar powered laser.
  - Coffee Cup Robo: Powers include explosive coffee cup chairs.
- Airportron: Appears in episode 8. Powers include dozens of grapple tentacles, mouth flames, and claw hands.
- Rifuken: Appears in episode 9. Powers include constricting wires from the abdomen and fusing with the nio komainu robos to become a four armed centaur-like monster armed with a whip tail, a pair of swords, a spear, and s trident.
- Nio Komainu Robo 1 and 2: Appear in episode 9. Powers include a bo staff and speed.
- Nanmanda: Appears in episode 9. Its only known power is having a stone body.
- Tochons 1 and 2: Appear in episode 10. Powers include strength and a torso beam.
- Dogun: Appears in episode 11. Powers include a rock-based body, a broadsword, and body part separation. It heavily resembles the Bound Doc from Zambot 3.
- Kamotsun: Appears in episode 12. This robo bears two forms:
1. Form 1: Powers include floating on top of water, crab claws, a storage container in its underside, four crab legs, and shedding into its second form.
2. Form 2: Powers include a pair of crab claws, a head laser cannon that rivals napalm, a high resistance to heat and projectile attacks, and a pair of net launchers from its head.
- Hevuida: Appears in episode 13. Powers include acid spray from the mouth, fast burrowing, and a high resistance to heat.
- Mecha Batta: Appears in episode 13. Powers include a heat-ray-emitting dish on its back and eye lasers.
- Ibarakan: Appears in episode 14. Powers include vine arms and vine cages that are both extendable and thorny and thorny vines spawned by seeds fired from the mouth.
- Sound Walker: Appears in episode 15. Powers include ultrasonic waves from the back, hidden arms armed with a beam sword in each hand, and a beam cannon on its rear end.
- Carry Gator: Appears in episode 16. Powers include a car-like form, a tire-like circular saw for the right hand that can be used as a shield, and foot wheels.
- Ganin: Appears in episode 17. Powers include four crab claws, high jumping, coiling wires, a press on its head, and a mouth glue gun.
- Time Gunner: Appears in episode 18. Powers include a nose laser cannon, using the gear in its body as flying circular saws, and an eye energy ray.
- Gondam: Appears in episode 19. Powers include a chained anchor, a pair of chained maces, treads, a bulldozer blade, a chainsaw, a hammer, a pair of drills, and a pair of beam blades.
- Ushira: Appears in episode 20. Powers include neck tentacles, drill bull horns, a whip-like tail, and explosive mouth fire-balls and lasers.
- Shiroda: Appear in episode 21. Powers include jumping, tail gravity rays, reformation, and a 3-tube missile pod launcher on each side of their face.
- Gondolar: Appears in episode 21. Its only known power is an extendable left arm.
- Yadogon: Appears in episode 22. Powers include antenna lasers, a back laser cannon, a laser barrage from the back, mouth webs, and mandibles.
- Towerza: Appears in episode 23. Its only known power is visor beams. It was created from Tokyo Tower, technically making it the largest of the Geister Robos.
- Densaurus: Appear in episode 24. Their only known power is speed.
- Ganseki: Appears in episode 25. Powers include a rock body, mouth flames, and reformation.
- Ligon: Appears in episode 26. Powers include a pair of saber teeth, a whip tail, and purple lightning from the forehead horn.
- Matsuri: Appears in episode 28. Powers include five missile launchers on each of its five tail feathers, a mouth energy ray, and flight.
- Coinmoth: Appears in episode 29. Powers include burrowing, a tusk energy beam, and a vacuum in its trunk designed to contain coins.
- Unin: Appears in episode 30. Powers include vacuums, pincer claws, drills, blaster cannons, chain anchors, flamethrowers, reformation, and battering rams.
- Nazca Lines Robos: Appear in episode 31. Their only know power is having a stone body.
- Buildon: Appears in episode 32. Powers include treads, electric balls from the head, and claw arms.
- Kabuking: Appears in episode 33. Powers include a glaive, an 8-tube spear-umbrella hybrid launcher in the forehead, and green electric eye beams.
- Taikukan: Appears in episode 34. Powers include a pair of steam rollers with the front of which being able to divide into a pair of hammers and mouth fire bombs.
- Vuitor: Appears in episode 35. Its only known power is a pair of energy beams from its head horn.
- Deathka Bochan: Appears in episode 36. Powers include a levitation cloak, boomerang scythe arms, size-changing, teleportation, a detachable head, six tentacle legs, and a scalp laser.
- Tosho Guns: Appear in episode 37. The one single ability shared by each is combination with each other:
1. Tosho Gun 1: Powers include a 4-barreled laser gun, firing metal sheets from its shoulders, and wrist missiles.
2. Tosho Gun 2: Powers include treads, and a pair of laser cannons armed with field projecting launchable claws.
- Getoron: Appears in episode 38. Powers include foot treads, extendable neck and finger tentacles, four missile launchers hidden in the torso, and spawning large body tentacles.
- Shuttle Lander: Appears in episode 39. Powers include a right arm drill, pink eye lasers, a missile launcher in each forearm, the back, and pelvis, and flight. It heavily resembles Getter Liger from Getter Robo G.
- Gesuidon: Appears in episode 41. Powers include sharp claws, a constricting tail, machine guns in each shoulder pipe, and a mouth flamethrower.
- Kelbeza: Appears in episode 42. Powers include flight, morphing its side heads into wings for flight mode, and mouth flamethrowers.
- Shogakon: Appears in episode 43. Powers include mandibles, whip-like antennae, and regeneration.
- Muscle Clause: Appears in episode 44. Powers include strength and high jumping.
  - Kenta Clause: Appears in episode 44 and is the mutated form of Muscle Clause. Powers include strength, energy bolts from the mouths of the twin reindeer heads on its hind end, a high resistance to heat, and a Christmas tree-like lance.
- Pharaon: Appears in episode 45. Powers include eye beams, a cyclone from the mouth, and speed.
- Grenda: Appears in episode 46. Its only known power is emitting flames from the cone-like mouth of both heads.
- Big Iced: Appears in episode 47. It is an ice-based duplicate of Dino Geist armed only with his Dino Thunder Swords.
