= Famicom Jump: Hero Retsuden =

1989 video game

- Cover art
- Developer: Tose
- Publisher: Bandai
- Producer: Shinji Hashimoto
- Designer: Hiroshi Oginome
- Writer: Noriyuki Sugimoto
- Composer: Haruki Adachi
- Series: Jump
- Platform: Family Computer
- Release: JP: February 15, 1989
- Genre: Action RPG
- Mode: Single-player

Famicom Jump: Hero Retsuden (ファミコンジャンプ 英雄列伝, Famikon Janpu Hīrō Retsuden; the subtitle translates to "Heroes History") is a 1989 role-playing video game for the Family Computer published by Bandai. The game commemorates the 20th anniversary of Shueisha's manga anthology Weekly Shōnen Jump.

The game is set in a world that brings together many of the long-running titles, which include stories of the past and present at the time of their release, that had appeared in the magazine. The game consists of a main character wandering and encountering the many Jump heroes as they try to save the world from an alliance of many of the most powerful and evil of the Jump villains.

The game sold 1.1 million cartridges for the Famicom in Japan. It was the first title in the Jump video game series. It had a sequel, Famicom Jump II: Saikyō no Shichinin.

== The 16 Heroes ==
One of the main objectives of the game is to recruit 16 notable Jump hero characters in order to use them to fight against the enemies in the game's overworld, which is divided into several different areas. Aside from the player character, the Jump characters that can be collected are:

- Kenshiro (Fist of the North Star)
- Nukesaku Aida (Tsuide ni Tonchinkan)
- Son Goku (Dragon Ball)
- Ryo Saeba (City Hunter)
- Arale Norimaki (Dr. Slump)
- Pegasus Seiya (Saint Seiya)
- Momotaro Tsurugi (Sakigake!! Otokojuku)
- Mankichi Togawa (Otoko Ippiki Gaki Daishō)
- Reiki Kikoku (Godsider)
- Joseph Joestar (JoJo's Bizarre Adventure: Battle Tendency)
- Jouji Kanou (Doberman Deka)
- Isamu (Kōya no Shōnen Isamu)
- Tsubasa Oozora (Captain Tsubasa)
- Tarou Yamashita (Kenritsu Umisora Kōkō Yakyūbuin Yamashita Tarō-kun)
- Kyūichi Uno (Astro Kyūdan)
- Kinnikuman (Kinnikuman)

Of particular note: Son Goku and Momotaro Tsurugi are the only characters who return in Famicom Jump II: Saikyō no Shichinin. Of the series with hero characters, JoJo's Bizarre Adventure also has a playable hero in the sequel, with Joseph succeeded by Jotaro Kujo. One NPC character in this game, Ryotsu Kankichi from Kochira Katsushika-ku Kameari Kōen-mae Hashutsujo, becomes playable as well in the sequel.

== Represented series ==
- Astro Kyūdan
- Captain Tsubasa
- Cat's Eye
- Chichi no Tamashii
- Circuit no Ōkami
- City Hunter
- Doberman Deka
- Dr. Slump
- Dragon Ball
- Fist of the North Star
- Ginga: Nagareboshi Gin
- Godsider
- Harenchi Gakuen
- High School! Kimengumi
- Hōchōnin Ajihei
- JoJo's Bizarre Adventure
- Kenritsu Umisora Kōkō Yakyūbuin Yamashita Tarō-kun
- Kick Off
- Kimagure Orange Road
- Kinnikuman
- Kochira Katsushika-ku Kameari Kōen-mae Hashutsujo
- Kōya no Shōnen Isamu
- Moeru! Onīsan
- Otoko Ippiki Gaki Daishō
- Ring ni Kakero
- Saint Seiya
- Sakigake!! Otokojuku
- Shape Up Ran
- THE MOMOTAROH
- Toilet Hakase
- Tsuide ni Tonchinkan
- Wing-Man
- Yoroshiku Mechadoc

== Reception ==
Famitsu rated the game as 21/40.
