= Famicom Jump II: Saikyō no Shichinin =

1991 video game by Chunsoft

- Cover art
- Developer: Chunsoft
- Publisher: Bandai
- Director: Koichi Nakamura
- Producer: Shinji Hashimoto
- Programmers: Masayoshi Saito; Takahiro Oki
- Artists: Takashi Ohta; Hiroshi Inokoshi
- Writers: Kazunori Orio; Fuminori Ishikawa
- Composer: Satoshi Kadokura
- Platform: Family Computer
- Release: JP: December 2, 1991
- Genre: Action role-playing game
- Mode: Single-player

Famicom Jump II: Saikyō no Shichinin (ファミコンジャンプII 最強の7人, Famikon Janpu Tsū Saikyō no Shichinin) is an action role-playing game for the Family Computer developed by Chunsoft and published by Bandai on December 2, 1991. The sequel to Famicom Jump: Hero Retsuden 『ファミコンジャンプ 英雄列伝』（published in 1989）, the game features seven main characters from different Weekly Shōnen Jump manga serialized at the time. Only four of the 16 represented titles from the original are brought back, while the remaining three are new to the sequel. There would not be another crossover game until the release of Jump Super Stars and Jump Ultimate Stars.

== Main characters ==
The player may begin the game with any of these seven characters. The player character chosen reflects the path the player will take through the characters' universes- starting from the selected character's home universe.

- Son Goku (Dragon Ball)
- Ryotsu Kankichi (Kochira Katsushika-ku Kameari Kōen-mae Hashutsujo)
- Momotaro Tsurugi (Sakigake!! Otokojuku)
- Jotaro Kujo (JoJo's Bizarre Adventure: Stardust Crusaders, replaces Joseph Joestar)
- Tar-chan (Jungle King Tar-chan)
- Tarurūto (Magical Taruruto)
- Maeda Taison (Rokudenashi Blues)

== Reviews ==
Famitsu Magazine reviewed the game at that moment, and get 8・7・8・4 marks, total 27/40.
