= List of Sakigake!! Otokojuku characters =

The following is a list of fictional characters who appear in Akira Miyashita's manga series Sakigake!! Otokojuku.

== Otokojuku ==
Otokojuku (男塾, Man Private School) is a private boys' school in Tokyo, established over 300 years ago. The headmaster Heihachi Edajima gathers delinquents from all over Japan and trains them to become the leaders of the next generation. At this school, Japanese chivalry is taught through feudal and military fundamentals.

Amongst the students, the first years are viewed as slaves, the second years as oni, and the third years as Enma. The third years take instruction from the headmaster alone, as the rest of the instructors are not at the same level as them and can not outpower them enough to punish them. The third years run things from the Tendo Shrine (天動宮), and will tour all over Japan in order to settle disputes.

=== Otokojuku Specialties ===
Anyone who fails to do anything in Otokojuku must undergo a Otokojuku Specialty (男塾名物, Otokojuku Meibutsu). The outside world is told that these are average school events and special lessons, but in actuality they are various torture methods and duels. A few specialties are known of outside the school, as evident when Hidemaro knew of the Oil Bath before enrolling.

==== Main Specialties ====
Chokushin Kougun (直進行軍, Non-Stop Marching)
Abura Buro (油風呂, Oil Bath)
Chikurinken Sumou (竹林剣相撲, Bamboo Forest Sword Sumo)
Mouryou Survival (魍魎サバイバル, Ghastly Survival)
Girochin (義呂珍, Guillotine)
Koro-seum (殺シアム, Killer-seum)
Taikai Shima Meguri (大海島巡り, Ocean Island Tour)
Jigoku Zen (地獄禅, Hell Zen)
Bakushingu (撲針愚, Boxing)
Gakuensai (愕怨祭)
Ragubii (羅惧美偉, Rugby)
Gokukai Bouren (獄悔房連, Penitence Jail)
Toushirou (盥支蠟)

==== Kyoura Daiyon Kyousatsu ====
(驚邏大四凶殺, The Four Great Astonishing Assaults)

Otokojuku's greatest specialty, used to settle disputes between two teams of four. The entrance is the 1,000-year-old Fujiyama-roku Hougokuin (富士山麓宝獄院, Mount Fuji Foot Treasured Hell Temple), which leads to the skeleton and corpse littered Anryoudou (暗魎洞, Dark Spirit Cave). At the end of it are two giant iron balls called the Houkongyoku (砲魂玉, Cannon Spirit Balls), which must be rolled up to the summit of Fujiyama. At the check-points, each team chooses one representative to take part in a fight. Whichever side wins in the end is awarded the Shouhyoukan (勝彰巻, Victorious Shadow Scroll) as champion.

Edajima is the only survivor in its 300-year history, having achieved a magnificent victory 50 years ago in 1950 (Shōwa 25). Inside Otokojuku is a memorial stone monument in honor of those who lost their lives.

Shakumyaku Ioukan (灼脈硫黄関, Scorching Sulfur Vein Gateway)
A fight at one of Japan's three great sulfur springs, the Fuji Shaku Gousen (富士灼獄泉, Fuji Scorching Hell Spring). The footing is only countless protruding rocks scattered across the place, and those that fall end up in a thousand degree temperature manganese acidic sulfur spring. Site of J vs. Raiden.
Dangai Chuurankan (断崖宙乱関, Violnet Midair Cliff Gateway)
A fight on Fuji's fifth side, the Kengen no Heki (懸厳の壁, Wall of Dangling Severity). Both men dangle from a rope with no footing, but the rope itself is made of steel, so there is no chance of it breaking. Site of Togashi vs. Hien.
Hyoubon Enmonkan (氷盆炎悶関, Blazing Ice Slab Gateway)
A fight in the Banryuuhyou (磐隆氷, Ice Covered Rock) ice ring inside the Ryuuryoudou (嚠喨洞, Wailing Cave) cave which in on the Fukankyou (不還橋, Bridge of No Return) land bridge. With icicles sharper than knives waiting below, the temperature from the flames lit on the ceiling causes the ring to gradually melt, eventually resulting in the fighters falling to the icicles. Site of Toramaru vs. Gekkou.
Choukyou Taisou Kafunkan (頂極大巣火噴関, Great Erupting Summit Gateway)
A fight in the Tenjoutou (天縄闘, Heavenly Cord Battlground) which lies on a large crater on the summit of Fuji. The spider-web shaped Tenjoutou is made of the Sekimenkou (石綿綱, Asbestos Rope) which is ignited in flames from all sides during the fight, the two fighters compete as the flames draw nearer and the footing becomes unstable. Before the battleground falls the crater bottom becomes the Sekisanko (赤酸湖, Red Acid Lake), filled with a large amount of poisonous hydrogen chloride gas. Site of Momo vs. Date.

==== Dai Ishin Pa-Lien Seiha ====
(大威震八連制覇, The Great Pa-Lien (Unified Eight) Quaking Conquest)

Though not specified as an Otokojuku Specialty, it is a martial arts tournament held once every three years connected to Otokojuku. It is and 8 on 8 team battle connected to the Pa-Lien Tenryuu legend of Sichuan and is held at the Pāron no Choujou (八竜の長城, Great Wall of Pa-Long) on the Yatsugatake Mountains in Shinshu, Nagano. It is Otokojuku's greatest fighting event, and whoever controls the Dai Ishin Pa-Lien Seiha also controls Otokojuku. The previous champion team chooses their opponent team, and Jaki has used this tournament to maintain his authority over the past 10 years.

Furthermore, the 8 on 8 tournament is carried out in four 2 on 2 tag matches, and each two-man team is decided in the Takushouseki ceremony. But, participants are capable of switching their members around if the opposing team agrees to it.

Shakusekibou (灼赤棒, Scorching Red Pole)
Takushouseki (託生石, Life Entrustment Stone)
Jigan Hyaku Chuurintou (磁冠百柱林闘, 100 Porcelain Column Forest Battleground)
Ryuubon Teimoutou (竜盆梯网闘, Dragon Slab Stairway Battleground)
Sanshou Rokkyoku Seitou (燦燋六極星闘, 6 Blazing Bright Stars Battleground)
Tenrai Kyoushintou (天雷響針闘, Thunder Echo Needle Battleground)

=== Students ===
==== 1st Year Students ====
===== Momotaro Tsurugi =====
(剣 桃太郎, Tsurugi Momotarō)

Voiced by: Hideyuki Hori.

Also known as Momo. The main character and the strongest of the 1st Years, later the Otokojuku Representative. He is fluent in multiple languages and is a master of various secret techniques, always wears a white hachimaki, carries around a katana, has a laid-back attitude and sense of humor and often dozes off during class. Very little is known about his past or how he got so strong. In the past, he trained at a temple to learn the Shoukyuu Soudan, and his son Shishimaru in Akatsuki!! Otokojuku underwent the same training. After graduating from Otokojuku, he enrolled in University of Tokyo, and after that he studied abroad at Harvard University. In Akatsuki!! Otokojuku he's retired from the position of Prime Minister of Japan.

Seiken Kobushi Wari (制拳こぶし割り, Dominate Punch Fist Splitter)
Momo crushes an opponent's fist by striking it with his own fist during their punch.
Mugen Ittou-ryuu (無限一刀流, Infinite Single Sword Style)
Momo's sword techniques which excel at both offense and defense.

Shinganken (心眼剣, Mind's eye Blade)
An iai strike performed while blinded.
Ichinotachi (一之太刀, Single Tachi)
Used in the fight against Shu Kougen. Momo covers his eyes with his hachimaki, draws a circle in the snow with his own blood, and strikes anyone he senses entering it.
Shishi Tourouken (四肢鐺瓏剣, Quartered Heated Dragon Blade)
When an opponent with a katana strikes continuously, Momo strikes at all of their limbs and steals their fighting spirit.

Hishou Kakusui Ken (秘承鶴錘剣, Secret Crane Spindle Blade)
Momo thrusts his katana into the ground and move onto it at high speed. This technique requires tough tendons, remarkable balance, and excellent taijutsu.

Rinsenjin (轔扇刃, Riled Fan Blade)
Momo grabs his katana between his toes and jumps high into the air, and performs a dropping attack be spinning fiercely.
Rinsenbuu (轔旋風, Riled Whirlwind)
Momo performs a handstand on his katana and spins around, creating a sudden gust of wind.

Shinkifuukon (暹氣虎魂, Rising Tiger Spirit)
Momo concentrates his ki into his sword blade and sends out a shockwave in the shape of a tiger. Because the overwhelming destructive power exhausts so much ki, it can only be used for a short period of time.
Kikoutouhou (氣功闘法, Ki Battle Tactics)
Battle tactics that rely on ki. When Momo exhausts a large amount of physical strength, his ki runs out as well and he sweats profusely.
Koufuken Saikou (硬布拳砕功, Stiff Cloth Fist Attack)
Momo injects his hachimaki with his ki and can use it as a blade for an instant.
Kensai Taikou (堅砦体功, Strong Fortress Body)
A defense technique where Momo focuses all of his ki into his chest. For an instant his chest becomes like an iron plate, and not even Jaki's Shinkuu Senpuu Shou can hurt him.
Shoukyuu Soudan (翔穹操弾, Soaring Manipulation Bullet)
A secret attack where Momo can freely manipulate his opponent's entire body. Momo was one of three successors to the technique, but because the technique is rather cruel and meant for trifling with opponent's lives he usually keeps it sealed away. See Sou Reigen for more information.

===== Genji Togashi =====
(富樫 源次, Togashi Genji)

Voiced by: Ken Yamaguchi, Hideo Ishikawa (PS3 game).

The leader of the Otokojuku Shock Corps and a close friend of Momo since the beginning of class. He is a brawler and uses a dosu knife. He always wears a tattered school hat, which is a memento from his late older brother Genkichi (Voiced by: Michihiro Ikemizu) who was killed years ago in the same battleground where Togashi fights Senkuu. He has a scar underneath his right eye from a fight 3 years before enrolling in Otokojuku. He does not have any formal martial arts training, but he shows an incredible fighting spirit. Although he has great fights against Hien and Senkuu, he later becomes a comical character and mostly serves as a commentator with Toramaru. He is well known for risking his life and seeming to die, only to return alive and well later. In Akatsuki!! Otokojuku he has become Edajima's secretary. Additionally, his father, Genzo Togashi, appears in Peerless: The Legend of Edajima Heihachi as an ace pilot for the Imperial Japanese Navy.

Kenka Sappou (ケンカ殺法, Killer Brawling)

Shinken Shira Hadori (真剣白歯どり)
Chuukai Nidan Keri (宙回二段蹴り, Midair Spinning Two Step Kick)
Kintama Tsubushi (金玉つぶし, Ball Breaker)

Bakuteisatsu (爆挺殺)
Kettouen (血闘援)
Combo Techniques
Used when teamed up with Toramaru.

Kamonchou Taihou (豭門跳體砲, Jump the Boar Gate Body Cannon)
Daihouhi Ningen Shurin (大放屁人間車輪, Great Fart Human Wheel)

===== Ryuji Toramaru =====
(虎丸 龍次, Toramaru Ryūji)

Voiced by: Yūsaku Yara.

A comical guy with herculean strength and a big appetite. He claims to practice Mouko-ryuu Kenpo, but in actuality it is just his own style of Kenpo. Because he farted in the face of an instructor the day he enrolled, he was accuses of treason and forced to hold up a 200 kg suspended ceiling for half a year. Although initially depicted as strong enough to knock out Momo and break off a piece of the ice ring with a single punch, he later mostly serves as a commentator with Togashi. Though he accepts this position and even calls himself the "Eternal Commentator of Otokojuku", whenever he does fight again he fights bravely. His specialty is sumo and he was a yokozuna back in his hometown. He will often fight wearing only his fundoshi. His father Ryuta appears in Peerless: The Legend of Edajima Heihachi in a maximum-security army prison, holding a suspended ceiling, the same way his son was introduced.

Moukou-ryuu (猛虎流, Fierce Tiger Style)
Toramaru's own style of kenpo.

Enzui Hachou Shou (延髄破暢掌)
Toramaru strikes the back of his opponent's head with a handblade. This technique was good enough to knock out Momo.
Nidan Senpuu Kyaku (二段旋風脚, Two Step Whirlwind Kick)
Toramaru jumps up and performs a two step kick. It is never made clear how he lands afterwards.
Dai Houhi (大放屁, Large Fart)
The secret of Moukou-ryuu. A powerful fart that with a wind speed that can launch Toramaru 100 meters.

Dai Houhi Kaenhousha (大放屁火炎放射, Large Fart Blazing Emission)
Toramaru ignites his Dai Houhi with a lighter.

San Rensa Kyuukon (三連鎖球棍, Three Time Swinging Ball)
Toramaru's kusarigama attached to an iron ball. It swings powerfully well, but is eventually smashed to pieces by Amon and Unmon. After that he only uses the sickle part.

===== J =====
Voiced by: Banjō Ginga.

An American and former student of the U.S. Annapolis Naval Academy. A boxer who uses spiked knuckles made of magnum steel and has a Mach Punch. Originally depicted as one of many students who came to Japan to study abroad, after his fight with Momo he enrolls in Otokojuku. His full name is King Battler Junior (キング・バトラー・ジュニア) and is the son of the well known boxer King Battler. He has several times faced an opponent who was confident in their victory against him, only to be defeated in a come from behind victory by a new blow. His English catchphrase is You are not my match. In Akatsuki!! Otokojuku he is the commander in chief of the navy. Additionally, King Battler appears in Peerless: The Legend of Edajima Heihachi.

Mach Punch (マッハ・パンチ)

Flash Piston Mach Punch (フラッシュ・ピストン・マッハ・パンチ)
Ring of Crime (リング・オブ・クライム)
Jet Sonic Mach Punch (ジェット・ソニック・マッハ・パンチ)

Flying Crash Megaton Punch (フライング・クラッシュ・メガトン・パンチ)
Spiral Hurricane Punch (スパイラル・ハリケーン・パンチ)
Trible Bred Jab Special (トリプル・ブレード・ジャブ・スペシャル)
Hell Dance (地獄の舞い（ヘル・ダンス）)
Fist of Fury (フィスト・オブ・フュアリー)
Corner of Deadend (コーナー・オブ・デッドエンド)
Knuckle (ナックル)

===== Hidemaro Gokukouji =====
(極小路 秀麻呂, Gokukōji Hidemaro)

Voiced by: Noriko Tsukase, Hiroko Emori (PS3 game).

A bratty yakuza successor who is enrolled in Otokojuku after his group crumbles due to his profligate ways. He is frequently teased for his short build, but obtains a form of personal growth by hoisting Otokojuku's massive school flag. In the anime, he disliked pro wrestling before entering Otokojuku. In the manga he refers to himself in the first person as boku (僕), but in the anime he says ore (オレ).

The live action film focuses a lot on his experience after enrolling in Otokojuku, making him a sort of second main character after Momo.

===== Taio Matsuo =====
(松尾 鯛雄, Matsuo Taio)

Voiced by: Juji Matsuda, Bin Shimada (PS3 game).

The comic relief character along with Hidemaro and Tazawa, he is also the lead yeller and bell ringer in the school's ōendan. He has an odd hairstyle, similar to the title character in Sazae-san. His bad premonitions often come true. His father, Koisachi Matsuo, appears in Peerless: The Legend of Edajima Heihachi as a similar comic relief role.

===== Shinichiro Tazawa =====
(田沢 慎一郎, Tazawa Shinichirō)

Voiced by: Masato Hirano.

The self-proclaimed "Intelligence of Otokojuku". He is also called the "Brains of Otokojuku", but he often messes up simple things like multiplication tables, making his knowledge questionable. However, he does have rare moments where a glimpse of true intelligence can be seen from him. In the Dai Ishin Paren Seiha Arc, it was his idea to form the "10,000 Man Bridge" human bridge. He was renamed Ippei Tazawa (田沢一平, Tazawa Ippei) in the anime. His father, Tazawa Shintaro, appears in Peerless: The Legend of Edajima Heihachi, and much like in the original series he serves as part of the comic relief duo with Matsuo.

===== Kiyomi Tsubakiyama =====
(椿山 清美, Tsubakiyama Kiyomi)

Voiced by: Kazuhiro Nakata.

A large student with a rather timid personality. He enrolled in Otokojuku to become more manly, but because he can't endure the strict training he tries to run away, only to be caught by Umanosuke Gonda, who then fights him in the men's dorm specialty match Chikurinken Sumou (竹林剣相撲, Bamboo Thicket Sword Sumo). Midway through the match he learns that Gonda had made yakitori out of his pet Pee-ko (ピー子), so he becomes enraged and avenges the little bird. After this he gains confidence in himself. Snow is his weakness. In the anime, he is a regular character from the first episode on and also has more lines.

==== 2nd Year Students ====
===== Gouji Akashi =====
(赤石 剛次, Akashi Gōji)

Voiced by: Katsuji Mori, Hikaru Midorikawa (PS3 game).

The strongest of the Otokojuku 2nd Years. He was suspended indefinitely 3 years ago on February 26 for nearly killing a 1st year student in what is referred to as the Otokojuku 2-26 Incident. Master of Ichimonji-ryuu rock splitting sword technique and carries around his sword Ichimonji Kanemasa (一文字兼正) on his back. It is a very sturdy sword, the only time it ever cracked was when it was hit by J's Magnum Steel Knuckle. He has silver hair, although it was changed to black in the anime.

Both first and second years fear him, and even the third years recognize his great skills. He fights as a supporter for the first time in the Tenchou Gorin Dai Bukai finals. After his fight against Hornet in the Battle of the Seven Tusks, he uses his Zanganken technique in order to save the other Otokojuku students from a trap and then dies. He entrusts his katana to Momo.

After the series ends he is confirmed to have lived. His son Juuzou appears in Akatsuki!! Otokojuku.

Ichimonji-ryuu (一文字流)

Zanganken (斬岩剣, Rock Cutting Blade)
Neppuuken (烈風剣, Gale Blade)
Mijinken (微塵剣, Atom Blade)
Kessenken (血栓貫)

===== Edogawa =====
(江戸川)

Voiced by: Ginzō Matsuo.

The leader of the 2nd years in Akashi's absence. Depicted as the main tormentor of the 1st years, he usually wears an overly forced smile, but when mad his face changes to one of a furious psychotic killer. In Akatsuki!! Otokojuku, decades have passed but he has yet to graduate and therefore is still enrolled in Otokojuku.

===== Other 2nd years =====
- Maruyama (丸山): Voiced by: Kazumi Tanaka
- Oni-Yokozuna (鬼横綱): Voiced by: Masahiro Anzai

==== 3rd Year Students ====
===== Jaki Daigouin =====
(大豪院 邪鬼, Daigōin Jaki)

Voiced by: Hideyuki Tanaka.

The leader of the third years and the Otokojuku representative. Known as the Emperor of Otokojuku, he has ruled the school for over 10 years. A master of Daigouin-ryuu and Kikou Touhou. In his earlier appearances he seemed as large as a daibutsu, but it later seems as though his fighting spirit gives off the feeling that he is that large.

He has won the Dai Ishin Paren Seiha three consecutive times, and he uses his power to defend his position. In the past he challenged Edajima to a duel but suffered his first loss, and came to realize the level of Edajima's greatness.

Before his fight against Spartacus in the Tenchou Gorin, he entrusted the proof of his position as Otokojuku representative to Momo. He continues fighting even after having his heart pierced, and kills himself while finishing the fight with his Shinkuu Senpuu Shou.

In Akatsuki!! Otokojuku he is still dead and his son Kouki is an orphan. Additionally, his father Shouki appears in Peerless: The Legend of Heihachi Edajima.

Daigouin-ryuu (大豪院流)

Shinkuu Senpuu Shou (真空殲風衝)
Fuubu Ouran Kaku (風舞殃乱鶴)
Doukyuu Hansha Kaku (撞球反射馘)
Kyouten Kaishoukou (驚天回旌杭)

Kikou Touhou (氣功闘法)

Soujousui (繰条錘)
Fudou Kana Shibari (不動金縛り)
Kensai Taikou (堅砦体功)

Shuuzou Toukon Goumaru (愀象刀金剛丸)

===== Eikei =====
(影慶)

Voiced by: Jūrōta Kosugi, Naoki Imamura (PS3 game).

The leader and strongest of the Otokojuku Shitennou (死天王). His loyalty to Jaki is very high, and not even in unconsciousness will he step on Jaki's shadow. He is a master of the Kiritsu-ryuu poison fist technique and the Kijin-ryuu weapon style. He joins Jaki in the final battle of the Paren Seiha in the Tenrai Kyoushintou against Momo & Gekkou and defeats Gekkou. In the Tenchou Gorin he is seeming killed during the Preliminary League, but returns later under the guise of Otokojuku's 2nd Supporter Shoukaku (翔霍).

Kiritsu-ryuu (愾慄流)

Senkyou Dokushu (穿凶毒手)

Kengen Geikai (拳幻睨界)

Dokushuken (毒手拳)
Genseirei (眩蜻蛉)
Resshishou (烈指翔)

Kijin-ryuu (愾塵流)

Honfu Nunchaku (犇斧ヌンチャク)
Kyoutouyoku (恟透翼)

===== Rasetsu =====
(羅刹)

Voiced by: Tetsu Inada (PS2 game), Takahiro Yoshimizu (PS3 game).

One of the Otokojuku Shitennou. He has fingers that can pierce anything and is a master of Kyouke Toushiki Ha. He and Baron Dino face Date and Toramaru in the Paren Seiha's Sanshou Rokkyouku Seitou. He possesses an incredible tenacity towards achieving victory at any cost. Years ago he and his platoon crossed the western country to face an old enemy and endured 3 days and 3 nights of hellish torture in a prison. In his fight against Sanen he sacrificed an arm to defeat him, a sacrifice he called a "scratch".

Kyouke (鞏家)

Toushiki Ha (兜指愧破)

Ryoudansatsu (両段殺)
Soushisatsu (双指殺)
Senki Toushiki Ha (千麾兜指愧破)
Toushikan Setsusai (兜指関節砕)
Dosuiryuu (土錐龍)

Myoukatsu Tosui no Hou (妙活渡水の法)
Goshou Zuiken (鼯樵橤拳)

Kakkuusatsu (滑空殺)
"Jou" Pakukan ([糸亀]縛環)
Gekishinkei Ha (激震経破)
Kokuonsatsu (黒闇殺)

===== Manjimaru =====
(卍丸)

Voiced by: Shigeru Chiba.

One of the Otokojuku Shitennou. He is a master of Mouryouken, the most feared and darkest form of Kenpo in history. He and Henshouki face J and Raiden in the Paren Seiha's Jikan Hyaku Chuurintou. He is also a master of poisonous weapon use and conceals needles in his mask. Twice in the Tenchou Gorin he fights against two opponents in a handicap match.

Mouryouken (魍魎拳)

Netsubu Kousatsushi (烈舞硬殺指)
Genmyou Jusshin Haku (幻瞑十身剥)
Genmyou Bunshin Haku (幻瞑分身剥)
Kyouhatsufu (龔髪斧)

Mugenkan (無限還)
Daisenkyoku (大旋曲)
Shuusenkai (襲尟界)

===== Senkuu =====
(センクウ)

Voiced by: Shūhei Murakuni, Ryōtarō Okiayu (PS3 game).

One of the Otokojuku Shitennou. He is a master of Mouryouken Dark Fist and Rikuke Killer Fist. He and Dokugantetsu fight Togashi and Hien in the Paren Seiha's Ryuubon Teimoutou. He is the Shitennou member with the most diverse techniques, including skills with razor sharp blades and excellent kicks. He is initially depicted as very masculine and often sweating, but is later depicted as a man of beauty, often holding a black rose in his mouth. He can use the rose as a weapon, but he is never actually shown doing so. He dislikes killing and always tries to avoid actually stabbing his enemies. He also shows respect to enemies who are willing to die to win, and even saved Togashi's life after defeating him.

Rikuke (戮家)

Senjou Rouchuuken (千条鏤紐拳)
Senjou Kekkaijin (千条獗界陣)
Rouchuuken Bakuchousatsu (鏤紐拳縛張殺)
Rouchuuken Bakuchou Kyaku (鏤紐拳縛張脚)
Kantenpai (還輾盃)
Youchou Shoujin (踊跳踵刃)
Retsujou Koushi (烈繞降死)
Shoujin Senpuu Kyaku (踵刃旋風脚)

Bisenryuu (靡閃流)

Kousaiken (薨砕拳)

===== Dokugantetsu =====
(独眼鉄)

Voiced by: Masaharu Satō.

One of the Chinju Chokurou Sannin-shuu (鎮守直廊三人衆, The Three from the Guardian Hall), aka the Banshinbou (万針房, 10,000 Needles Bunch) guard. A master of Niou-ryuu with strong muscles and a poison eye. He also has a rough physique and light gymnastic moves, as well as muscles like steel that not even 1,000 pickaxes could pierce. He claims to be the one who killed Togashi's brother Genkichi.

During the battle against Rouroukan in the Tenchou Gorin Preliminary League he attacks Sou Reigen, but Sou Reigen destroys his poison eye with his Shoukyuu Soudan and breaks his spine, killing him. He is the first Otokojuku fighter to die.

In the Paren Seiha he displays a sadistic personality disorder by viciously attacking Hien repeatedly, but he is actually a shy and gentle person despite his huge body and grim face. In the anime he wears an eyepatch.

Niou-ryuu (仁王流)

Gousaiken (號賽拳)
Joukasatsu Dai Sharin (錠枷殺大車輪)

Hakubu Dai Enban (釽舞大円盤)

===== Henshouki =====
(蝙翔鬼)

Voiced by: Kōji Totani, Toshio Furukawa (PS3 game).

One of the Chinju Sannin-shuu, aka the Suiyoubou (垂溶房) guard. A master of one of China's 3 Great Strange Attacks Nanchouji Kyoutaiken and the special techniques Tenpin Shouha and Kousou Henjutsu. His right hand is artificial and he can replace it with blades and his Tosatsu Fuusha. In the manga he had black hair, but in the anime it was changed to silver.

From his first appearance to the Paren Seiha he had puffy eyelids and the face of a sarcastic senpai character and used cowardly tactics, but in the Tenchou Gorin his face was more slender and attractive. His tactics also changed, and he started using frontal attacks during his Kousou Henjutsu technique.

In the end he is stabbed by Centaur's unicorn horn and dies. He was able to see through Gekkou's blindness.

Nanchouji Kyoutaiken (南朝寺教体拳)

Tenpin Shouha (天稟掌波)
Chuukuu Hyouken (宙空憑拳)
Tosatsu Fuusha Ken (賭殺風車拳)
Tosatsu Fuusha (賭殺風車)
Kousou Henjutsu (煌嗾蝙術)

Kaichuu Fuyuutai (乖宙浮遊體)
Shuuhen Keishoutai (驟蝙形象體)
Shahei Antai (遮蔽闇體)

Shasaisetsu (謝砕節)
Artificial hand (義手, Gishu)

===== Baron Dino =====
(男爵ディーノ, Danshaku Dīno)

Voiced by: Keaton Yamada, Kōji Haramaki (PS3 game).

One of the Chinju Chokurou Sannin-shuu, aka the Shidenbou (紫電房, Purple Lightning Tuft) guard. A master of Kyokusatsu Doruben, Shisen Chouken, and Hell's Magic. His conspicuous looks include a silk hat and a kaiser moustache. He is usually a polite gentleman with courteous speech, but when he is mad he completely snaps. Though he is highly influenced by the western world, he usually wears a fundoshi. In the Tenchou Gorin Finals League he suddenly changes his fighting style to tricky tactics. He later appears alive in Akatsuki!! Otokojuku.

The wrestler Danshoku Dino named himself after this character.

Kyokusatsu Doruben (棘殺怒流鞭)

Hoja Gekiran (葡蛇撃嵐)
Dead Bone Hiking (デッドボーン・ハンギング)

Shisen Chouken (死穿鳥拳)
Hell's Magic (地獄の魔術, Heruzu Majikku)

Solingen Card (ゾリンゲン・カード)
Miracle Cutter (眩魔切断術, Mirakuru Kattā)
Miracle Cane (奇跡の杖, Mirakuru Kein)

=== New First Year Students ===
==== Souji Togo ====
(東郷 総司, Tougou Souji)

A vulgar young man who wears his previous school's hat, geta, and overcoat. He survives Otokojuku's Russian roulette entrance exam and possesses such raw courage that he never hesitated to pull the trigger. He challenges Momo to decide who deserves the title Otokojuku Representative but is defeated, even with using his motorcycle as a weapon. After this, he takes part in the mission to save Edajima in the Battle of the Seven Tusks.

Bike Sappou (バイク殺法, Killer Motorcycle Tactics)

===== Former Tenchou Gorin Opponents =====
For information on each, see Tenchou Gorin Dai Bukai. They are second years in the Battle of the Seven Tusks Arc.

- Sou Reigen
- Shu Kougen
- Tou Fuketsu
- Pharaoh
- Hakuhou
- Souketsu
- Gouki Todo
- Gobalski

===== Former Kanto Gogakuren opponents =====
- Omito Date
- Raiden
- Hien
- Gekkou

=== Staff ===
- Heihachi Edajima (江田島 平八, Edajima Heihachi): The headmaster of Otokojuku and a former Navy Rear Admiral. He is a bull-headed kendo master teaching troubled youths to be warriors. As a child prodigy, he entered Tokyo University at a very young age with only a week's study. He fought bravely in World War II as an imperial soldier. This character is modeled after the Imperial Japanese Navy admiral Togo Heihachiro (東郷平八郎; The city of Edajima (江田島) was the site of the former Japanese Imperial Naval Academy; see ja:海軍兵学校). He often solves his problems by uttering his catchphrase "I am headmaster of Otokojuku, Edajima Heihachi!" (わしが男塾塾長, 江田島平八である!, Washi ga Otokojuku Jukuchō Edajima Heihachi de aru!).

Voiced by: Daisuke Gōri, Unshō Ishizuka (PS3 game)

- Wang Ta Ren (王大人): The substitute headmaster of Otokojuku. His hair resembles a bowl of ramen and he has a Pa Long (八竜) tattoo on his forehead. He is an old friend of Edajima and is about as strong as him, with enough power to fight against Kennou of the Shinken Temple. He tends to speak with only Chinese kanji whenever he appears. He excels at both medicine and genjutsu and is in charge of the students' medical treatment. He has studied 3,000-year-old Chinese secrets regarding medicine. In Peerless: The Legend of Edajima Heihachi, he meets Edajima at Tokyo Imperial University and teaches him martial arts. Voiced by: Ikuya Sawaki
- Oni-Hige (鬼ヒゲ, Demon Beard): The main instructor of the 1st year students. His appearance is indeed that of an Oni instructor, but he is also a very petty and egotistical person. The students generally dislike him but have been known to show concern for him sometimes. When not instructing, he likes to go to Harajuku and attempt nanpa, but because of his looks women tend to run away from him. In the anime he wore a kendo outfit and became more comical to better fit Shigeru Chiba's adlibbing. His father, Oni-Hage (Demon Bald), appears in Peerless: The Legend of Edajima Heihachi. Voiced by: Shigeru Chiba
- Hikoubou (飛行帽, Aviation hat): One of the other instructors, he is usually seen with Tetsu Kabuto. He dresses like a fighter pilot and has a wife and daughter (who also wear fighter pilot hats). In the anime he dresses like a monk and is referred to as Rankiryuu (乱気流, Turbulence). Voiced by: Ryōichi Tanaka, Naoki Imamura (PS3 game)
- Tetsu Kabuto (鉄カブト, Iron Helmet): One of the other instructors, he is usually seen with Hikoubou. As his name implies, he wears an iron helmet. He also has a moustache and wears round glasses. In earlier chapters he also wore a Nazi armband. In the anime his face was changed and he was referred to as Ninja (忍者). Voiced by: Ikuya Sawaki
- Umanosuke Gonda (権田 馬之助, Gonda Umanosuke): The superintendent of the Otokojuku student dorms. He likes to work the students unreasonably hard. His specialty dish is escargot. Voiced by: Kōji Totani
- Onidako Nyuudou (鬼蛸入道)
- Captain Ahab (キャプテン鱏破布, Kyaputen Eahabu)
- Major Rambo (乱坊少佐, Ranbou-shousa)
- Vice Principal: An anime original character, he also acts as Edajima's secretary. Voiced by: Masaharu Satō
- First Year Students' Budō Instructor: Voiced by: Hirohiko Kakegawa

== Kanto Gogakuren ==
The Kanto Gogakuren (関東豪学連, Great Kanto Student Body) is a fictional group from Akira Miyashita's manga series Sakigake!! Otokojuku.

A group formed by Omito Date after leaving Otokojuku. He leads them in an attack on Otokojuku during a festival. They then take on Momotaro and the other main first years in the Kyoura Daiyon Kyousatsu.

=== Members ===
==== Omito Date ====
(伊達 臣人, Date Omito)

Voiced by: Hirotaka Suzuoki, Hiroaki Hirata (PS3 game).

The Former leader of gogakuren school army. He uses the Hakyokuryuu retractable spear. He has three scars on each side of face. He is a feminist and refuses to kill women. Long ago he was a first year at Otokojuku but left after killing an instructor. He then became the class president of the Kanto Gogakuren and led the attack against the Momo and the first years in the Kyoura Daiyon Kyousatsu. He fights and is defeated by Momo in the 4th Assault Choukyoku Taisouka Funkan (頂極大巣火噴関, Great Erupting Summit Ring) and afterwards returns to Otokojuku. He assumes a second-in-command type role and usually fights the second strongest enemies. He was voted as the most popular character (even more popular than Momo) several times. In Ten yori Takaku and Akatsuki!! Otokojuku he has become the boss of a Bōryokudan, and his clone appears under the name Bishamonten of Hyoei Todo's Seven Lucky Gods.

Hakyoku-ryuu (覇極流)

Chihoujin (千峰塵)
Souten Kyaku (槍転脚)
Tenbyoukan (点鋲鹹)
Karyuu Tenrou Ran (渦流天樓嵐)
Karyuu Kaihou Ran (渦流回峰嵐)
Mugen Tsuikensou (無限追顕槍)
Sajin Fuusha (砂塵風車)
Jatetsusou (蛇轍槍)

Jatetsu Gendousou (蛇轍眩憧槍)

Uroyakenuma (宇呂惔瀦)
Manji Tengyuu Gatame (卍天牛固め)

Manji Tengyuu Gatame Rakkarin (卍天牛固め落下輪)

Kenshitei (拳止)
Kichoutou (気張禱)

==== Gogakuren San Menken ====
(豪学連三面拳, Three Faces of Gogakuren)

Later the Otokojuku San Menken (男塾三面拳). The member's names come from old Japanese Army aircraft. In Akatsuki!! Otokojuku it is revealed that the Gogakuren Sanmenken are actually the 152nd Sanmenken, and the Sanmenken have existed for 2000 years, each generation chosen by phrenology, each with the same names, faces, fighting styles, and destinies as their predecessors. The 153rd Sanmenken serve the Sodom World Council.

===== Raiden =====
(雷電, Mitsubishi J2M)

Voiced by: Shōzō Iizuka, Yasunori Masutani (PS3 game).

The leader of the Sanmenken and master of Daiou Jouryuu taijutsu, the oldest form of Chinese Kenpo in history (fictional). He has a tattoo of Daioujou (大往生) on his forehead. Uses knived shoes and fights with three monkeys later. He fights J in the Daiyon Kyousatsu 1st Assault Shakumyaku Ioukan (灼脈硫黄関, Scorching Sulfur Vein Ring). At first his taijutsu overwhelms J, but J ends the match in a draw with one of his Mach Punches. After this he enrolls in Otokojuku with Date and the other Sanmenken. He is very serious and loyal but has occasionally shown a comical side. He is always training in all forms of Kenpo, and therefore can usually recognize and explain all enemy's techniques or identities. He is thought to be killed in the fight with Ryoukou, the boss of the Excellent Ryouzanpaku 16, but returned alive later.

Daiou Jouryuu (大往生流)

Houkakuken (鳳鶴拳)
Kakusoku Kaiken (鶴足回拳)

Hishou Kakusoku Kaiken (飛翔鶴足回拳)

Rinshou Renge (輪笙蓮華)
Shikoushin (髭勾針)
Hanryuu Soutai (槃旒双體)
Chouryou Kindan (脹隴筋弾)
Gessajin (月鎖刃)

===== Hien =====
(飛燕, Kawasaki Ki-61)

Voiced by: Keiichi Nanba, Kazunari Tanaka (PS3 game).

One of the Sanmenken and a master of Choujinken who shows a liking for magnificent movement. He also uses throwing acupuncture needles that can manipulate an enemy's muscle movement. He usually wears a standard gakuran, but wears a Chinese fighter keikogi when fighting. He fights Togashi in the Daiyon Kyousatsu 2nd Assault Dangai Chuurankan (断崖宙乱関, Violent Midair Cliff Ring). His Choujinken dominates the entire fight, but Togashi's luck and will power forces the fight to end in a draw. He has long hair and bishōnen looks. He is also very popular with female fans and is often asked by Toramaru and the others to introduce them to girls. His hobby is knitting. He is initially a narcissist, but from the Tenchou Gorin on he has a calmer personality. He shows no mercy for his enemies. His hair in manga is a light pink color, but in the anime is hot pink. In Ten yori Takaku he has become a doctor and president of the All Japan Seinen Medical Association.

Choujinken (鳥人拳, Birdman Fist)

Kakushi Senpon (鶴嘴千本)

Juuji Uchi (十字打ち)
Danshinsetsu (断神節)
Renketsushou (連結衝)
Santenshou (三点衝)
Mumyou Tousatsu (無明透殺)

Youkasatsu (鷹爪殺)
Nenkeiten Kyaku (捻頸転脚)
Hichouryou Tsuiran (飛鳥憭墜乱)
Shuuensetsu (終焉節)

Soushou Kyokukou (双掌極煌)

Kakushi Koushoumu (鶴嘴紅漿霧)

===== Gekko =====
(月光, Nakajima J1N)

Voiced by: Yukitoshi Hori. The strongest of the Senmenken. He is a master of Chakukeryuu Kenpo and also possesses a tough will and physical strength. He uses a retractable baton which he once fought with as a golf club with steel golf balls. He fights and is defeated by Toramaru in the Daiyon Kyousatsu 3rd Assault Hyoubon Enmonkan (氷盆炎悶関, Ice and Fiery Anguish Ring). During the Dai Ishin Pa-Lien Seiha tournament, Omito swapped with him fearing the 3rd years will not accept a 3rd defeat. It is established during his fight with Centaur that he is naturally blind, but his skills are so good he can perform many tasks a regular blind man can not. He is thought to be killed by Raj Mahal of the Meiou Island 16 Warriors, but he was revived with brain surgery and returns as an enemy against Momo and Otokojuku in The Battle of The Seven Tusks. In the end he regains his memory and returns to Otokojuku.

Chakukeryuu (辵家流)

Kakusaikou (核砕孔)
Tengai Shinten (纒欬針点)
Mumyou Sassoukan (無明察相翫)

Souyokuhan (双翼飜)

Tengai Soshindan (纏劾狙振弾)

Senkyokudan (旋曲弾)
Sankouryuu Seidan (散寇流星弾)

Senpeibaku (扇蔽幕)
Gyouan Koushoumu (暁闇紅漿霧)
Suukasshuu (趨滑襲)
Kisougeki (奇踪撃)
Hazuki Dai Sharin (覇月大車輪)

Doshouboku (怒粧墨)
Hakyokuryuu Konpou Jutsu (覇極流棍法術)

==== Other Gogakuren Students ====
- Taiki Morita (森田 大器, Morita Taiki): Voiced by: Jūrōta Kosugi
- Ōnyūdō (大入道): Voiced by: Hirohiko Kakegawa

== Tenchou Gorin Dai Bukai ==
=== Promoters ===
- Hyoei Todo (藤堂 兵衛, Toudou Hyouei)
- Hassam (ハッサム)

=== 16 Practitioners of Phantom Lizard Style ===
(衒蜥流十六衆, Genseki-ryuu Juuroku-shuu)

A group from a martial arts school that specializes in cooperation techniques, they are Otokojuku's first opponent in the prelims. They proclaim to be trained at a pro level and refer to the Otokojuku students as "boys", but they are all defeated by J alone.

=== 16 Knights of Bando Style ===
(蕃鐃流十六騎, Bandou-ryuu Juurokki)

A group that uses the Bando-ryuu Instant Kill Kusarigama (蕃鐃流疾殺鎖鎌, Bandou-ryuu Shissatsu Kusarigama). All members wear hachimakis with Kyousatsu (凶殺) written on them. They fight against Rouroukan in the 2nd preliminary round, but they all have their necks broken by Shuten-Doji's Kaitou Senkotsusatsu.

=== Rouroukan ===
(狼髏館, Wolf Skull Castle)

Otokojuku's opponents in the Preliminary League.

Sou Reigen (宗 嶺厳)
Voiced by: Toshio Furukawa (PS2 game). Leader of the 15 Rouroukan. He is a genius master of taijutsu and in his youth learned the Shoukyuu Soudan. He kills Dokugantetsu, who attacks him after he mocks Otokojuku. During his fight with Momo he tries to force him to commit seppuku with the Shoukyuu Soudan, but Momo instead uses his own Shoukyuu Soudan to make him commit seppuku. However, Momo spares his life and makes him miss his vitals, and because of this he reforms. After the tournament ends he enrolls in Otokojuku.

Shoukyuu Soudan (翔穹操弾, Soaring Manipulation Bullet)

Choutou Sankaku Uchi (跳搨三角打ち)
Rensokusha (連速射)

Shuten-Doji (首天童子)
Voiced by: Jūrōta Kosugi (audio drama).
Chindou-Taishi (鎮獰太子)

=== 16 Fighting Olympus Gods ===
Zeus (聖紆塵, Zeusu)
Voiced by: Mahito Ōba (PS2 game), Norio Wakamoto (audio drama). The chief god of Olympus. His heart, technique, and body are exceedingly powerful and he is completely on par with Jaki Daigouin. Three years ago at the Kanretsu Budou Taikai finals he and Jaki had a tremendous death match that finally ended in a draw after three days. Over the following three years he trains his fist and realizes their skills are indeed equal, so he proposes they settle things with the Snake Blood Contract. He torments Jaki with his Shining God Hands, but Jaki eventually strikes his key muscle with his Fuubu Ourankaku and defeats him. Zeus makes one last attempt to stand, but Jaki knocks him down for good with his Kyouten Kaishoukou. When Jaki tries to give him a serum out of friendship, he rejects him but drinks it without hesitation and kills himself by shoving his fist into his chest.

Shining God Hands (シャイニング・ゴッド・ハンズ)
Snake Blood Contract (蛇血誓闘, Sneeku Buraddo Kontorakuto)

Centaur the Unicorn (一角獣の搴兜稜萃, Ikkakujuu no Kentaurosu)
Gemini (贅魅爾, Jemini)
Achilles the Unicycle (一輪車の顎翎洙, Ichirinsha no Akiresu)
Argos (埃琉轟洙, Arugosu)
Icarus (毬露洙, Ikarosu)
Apollon (鴉葡掄, Aporon)
Hercules (嬖輅翎洙, Herakuresu)
Prophet Delphi (予言者蜒琉菲, Yogensha Derufi)

=== 16 Priests of Gandhara ===
Shu Kougen (朱 鴻元)
Voiced by: Kazuyuki Sogabe (audio drama). Leader of the 16 Priests of Gandhara and the 57th high priest of Gandhara. After conquering the criminal underworld he participates in the tournament. The other 16 priests refer to him as Daisoujou-sama (大僧正, Lord High Priest), while the elder of Gandhara Temple and the Gandhara San Housei refer to him as Waka-sama (若様, Young Master). He keeps blades behind his limbs and hip and because Gandhara village has a perpetually snowy climate he specializes in battle under snowfall. He fights Momo in the finals and nearly defeats him with his snow rats, but Momo defeats him with his Shishi Tourouken, missing his vitals and sparing his life. After the tournament concludes he enrolls in Otokojuku, but unlike the others who enrolled at the same time as him, he was mostly inactive from then on.

Senshou Gohoujin (潜敞五方陣)

Senshou Tenkaijin (潜敞転回陣)
Senshou Onshuujin (潜敞隠輯陣)

Seppatan Soutei (雪波単輳艇)
Higan Enjusatsu (彼岸怨呪殺)

Ryuuhou (竜宝)
Voiced by: Masaharu Satō (audio drama)
Enbou (猿宝)
Gyuuhou (牛宝)
Tenshou-Houshi (囀笑法師)
Taigen-Houshi (颱眩法師)

=== Paron Kokurenju ===
Tou Fuuketsu (鄧 罦傑)
The head of the Kokurenju. He uses the Shoukeja Gouken which allows him to manipulate countless snakes at will. He corners J on a cliff with his Kyokuousatsu and Jagou Kekkaishuu techniques, but when a crack on the battleground of Akashi's battle effects their battleground, J is able to defeat the snakes in one clean sweep. With the battleground on the verge of collapse he uses the snakes as a rope, and although he narrowly survives he suggests to J that they stop. After the tournament ends he enrolls in Otokojuku.

Shoukeja Gouken (鐘家蛇彊拳)

Kyoku Ousatsu (殛盎殺)
Jagou Kekkaishuu (蛇彊結徊歰)
Jagouben (蛇彊鞭)

Amon (阿們)
Voiced by: Banjō Ginga (audio drama)
Unmon (呍們)
Voiced by: Kaneto Shiozawa (audio drama)
Fu Chin (馮椿)
Koushūshi (寇鷲使)
Chan Ho (張鳳)

=== Pharaoh Sphinx ===
Pharaoh (ファラオ)
Voiced by: Bin Shimada (PS2 game), Ikuya Sawaki (audio drama). The legitimate successor of the Pharaoh Sphinx. He fights Momo underneath a solar eclipse, entering as a shining form from a golden coffin. In the middle of his Reincarnation Cycle, his true form lurked in the coffin and he repeatedly threw firefly shaped knives from within. His true form is a large bald man with big ears, and he dominates Momo with his Venus of Ishtar and Agony of Oedipus techniques, but when Momo sees a photo of Edajima that falls from the bag Jaki had given him and becomes riled, he is defeated in a come from behind victory. After the fight ends, he feels in debt to Momo for risking his life to save him when their battleground collapsed, and as proof of their friendship he gives Momo his Tutankhamun's Tear forehead jewel. After the tournament concludes he enrolls in Otokojuku. From the Battle of the Seven Tusks on he is a comical character.

Reincarnation Cycle of Horemheb (永劫（ホレンヘブ）の輪廻核惺, Horenhebu no Rinne Kakusei)
Morning Star of Ishtar (イシュタールの暁星, Ishutāru no Gyousei)
Agony of Oedipus (オイディプスの煩悶, Oidipusu no Hanmon)

Tosca (トスカ)

Tutankhamun's Tear (ツタンカーメンの涙, Tsutankāmen no Namida)
Dance of Cleopatra (クレオパトラの舞い, Kureopatora no Mai)

Anubis (アヌビス)
Seti (セティ)
Horus (ホルス)
Djoser (ジェセル)
Pinedjem (ピネジェム)
Neskhons the Khnum (石壺のネスコンス, Kunumu no Nesukonsu)

=== The Excellent Ryozanpaku 16 ===
Ryoukou (梁皇)
Voiced by: Bin Shimada (audio drama)
Sanen (山艶)
Hakuhou (泊鳳)
Voiced by: Kenji Nojima (PS2 game). The youngest of the Ryozanpaku Three Heads. He often displays a comical side, but he is actually a child prodigy of Kenpo and a master of Taidousatsu no Hou. In his fight with J he mocks him by drawing a square ring in the sand and saying the first to be knocked out loses. Though he overwhelms J for most of the match, J wins in the end with his Spiral Hurricane Punch. Afterwards, Hakuhou leaves the battleground himself and apologizes for mocking his father. After Ryozanpaku's elimination he is the only surviving one of the Three Heads and vows to rebuild Ryozanpaku, but after the tournament he enrolls in Otokojuku.

Taidousatsu no Hou (體動察の法)
Shouteiha (掌羝破)

Chouren Shouteiha (吊連掌羝破)

Taitouki (體透覉)

General Song Jiang (宋江将軍)
Souketsu (蒼傑)
Voiced by: Katsuji Mori (audio drama). An archer of superb spirit and skill and a master of Ryozanpaku-tou Kyuujutsu. He accurately hits the badge on Togashi's hat from 500 meters away. He faces against Gekkou and his Tengai Soshindan in the Soujou Gekisha, using 10 arrows before hitting him with his Kouinchou Haisatsu. But he just barely misses his vitals, so Gekkou uses his last 8 shots to perform the Sankou Ryuuseidan and bust Souketsu's arm and evade a second Kouinchou Haisatsu. Souketsu receives the arrow in his chest this time, but Gekkou uses his Tengai Shinten to push it out and spare his life. After the tournament he enrolls in Otokojuku.

Ryouzanpaku-tou Kyuujutsu (梁山泊闘弓術)

Sanrenkan (三連貫)
Renshateki (連射的)
Kyouhonsai (驚奔砕)
Kouinchou Haisatsu (光陰跳背殺)
Shihatsu Toudan (指撥透弾)

Soujou Gekisha (双条檄射)

Houketsu (蓬傑)
Suiketsu (酔傑)
Taiketsu (體傑)
Touketsu (頭傑)

=== 16 Warriors of Meiou Island ===
Gouki Todo (藤堂 豪毅, Toudou Gouki)
Voiced by: Kōji Totani (PS2 game). The commander of the 16 Warriors of Meiou Island. He has studied all forms of combat at the Souryuu Temple and mastered the Shinki Ryuukon.
He is Hyoei Todo's adopted son. He is quite vicious and inhuman, having battled his four "brothers" in a battle to decide who is Todo's son and also killed his own master who stole a secret scroll. However, he has also shown a deep compassionate and honorable side, like when he attacked a subordinate who tried to shoot Michelle while he was saving Togashi.
He had an even match against Momo and his Shinki Fuukon, but the burden of his teammates being imprisoned prevented his Shinki Fuukon, turning it into a one sided match. After the ōendan of his classmates reawakens Momo, Gouki suggests they settle things with the Entou Kyouyutou. He is sure of a victory after he breaks Momo's katana, but Momo ties the katana back together with his hachimaki and uses it as a boomerang to attack from behind, dousing Gouki in flames.
After the flame of Momo's Shinki Fuukon disappears, Hyoei Todo has a sniper shoot him with a tranquilizer bullet. Unaware of this, Gouki overwhelms Momo with his Senretsuken and goes to stab him with his katana, but his katana breaks on the Otokojuku Representative Successorship Proof pendant Jaki had given Momo and instead Momo's fist goes through Gouki's chest. Afterwards Gouki is made aware of Momo's gunshot wound and raises his hand in victory before collapsing.
After the tournament he enrolls in Otokojuku and graduates with Momo and the others. In Ten yori Takaku he has taken over the remains of the Todo Clan.

Souryuu-ji (蒼龍寺, Blue Dragon Temple)

Shinki Ryuukon (暹氣龍魂)
Senretsuken (千烈拳)

Entou Kyouyutou (炎刀嗋油闘)

Spartacus (スパルタカス)
Shiran (紫蘭)
Hon Rinmei (洪 礼明)
Shai Khan (シャイカーン)
Fubirai Khan (フビライカーン)
Kirugisu Khan (キルギスカーン)
Raj Mahal (ラジャ・マハール)
Gobalski (ゴバルスキー)
A.k.a. Gobalski of Siberia (シベリアのゴバルスキー, Shiberia no Gobarusukii), he is a user of the Siberian wolf controlling Rousouken, he also possesses enough monstrous strength to lift a boulder above his head. He refers to his wolves as his brothers. He nearly beats J with his Tougun San Chuushou, but J uses his Jet Sonic Megaton Punch to break the Todo Statue to bury the wolves underneath the rock. He then uses his personal taijutsu to fight and overwhelms J with his Binsakai Shousai, Soukaku Byoukou, and Soukaku Houchuusatsu, but J hits him on the crown of his head with his Flying Crash Megaton Punch, burying him up to his head in the ground. Because he abused their feelings during the fight his "brothers" were about to eat his head, but J had broken all their fangs and subsequently saved Gobalski's life. After the tournament ends he enrolls in Otokojuku and, along with Hakuhou and Pharaoh, acts as the comic relief. He has not cleaned his fundoshi in three years.

Rousouken (狼蒼拳)

Santen Rouha (三転狼巴)
Tougun San Chuushou (塔狼三柱聳)
Binsakai Shousai (罠鎖回驤砕)

Tetsujoubin (鉄錠罠)

Soukaku Byoukou (双角藐攻)
Soukaku Houchuusatsu (双角放宙殺)
Romulus and Remus (ロムルス・レムス)

Red Thunder (赤い稲妻, Reddo Sandaa)
Michelle the Black Rose (黒薔薇のミッシェル, Kuro Bara no Missheru)
Ryuu Zuiki (劉 菘喜)
Ryuu Zuikyou (劉 菘胠)

== Battle of Seven Tusks ==
=== Tusks of Darkness ===
- Roberto Borsalino (ロベルト・ボルサリーノ)
- Mario Angelo (マリオ・アンジェロ)
- James Hendrix (ジェームス・ヘンドリックス)

=== 1st Tusks: Apparition Tower ===
- Aleut Khamsin (アリュート・カムシン)
- Samutan (サムタン)
- Dashiruma (ダーシルマ)
- Giga (ギーガー)
- Clinsman (クリンスマン)
- Maifa (マイファ)

=== 2nd Tusks: Path to the Palace ===
- Gascoigne (ガスコイン)
- Maha Meta (マハ・メータ)
- Devarez (デバレス)
- Herber (ヘルバー)
- Vermillion (バーミリオン)
- Doctor Evelstein (ドクター・エーベルシュタイン)

=== 3rd Tusks: Alcatraz Island Prison ===
- Siegfried (ジークフリード)
- Stanley Gordon (スタンリー・ゴードン)
- Hou Kintan (宝 金丹)
- Hou Gintan (宝 銀丹)
- Doc Rotton (ドク・ロットン)
- Colonel Hornet (ホーネット大佐, Hōnetto-taisa)

=== 4th Tusks: Shinken Temple ===
- Kennou (拳皇)
- Jinshou (仁蒋)
- Gishou (義蒋)
- Chishou (智蒋)
- Shunran (春蘭)

=== 5th Tusks: Bugen Castle ===
- Gokan-sama (御館様)
- Yukinojou (幽鬼之丞)
- Shikibu (死跽部)

== Fu'un Rakanjuku ==
Fu'un Rakanjuku (風雲羅漢塾, Wind and Clouds Arhat Private School) is the east's Otokojuku's rival school of the west. They are more westernized and modern than Otokojuku, and use Italian-made blazers as uniforms. 30 years after Kumada and Edajima's oath they hold the Gokonsen (五魂遷) pentathlon to test the schools' courage, intelligence, strength, solidity, and unity.

Kinzo Kumada (熊田 金造, Kumada Kinzou)
The headmaster of Fu'un Rakanjuku. Edajima's rival from his Imperial University days, they are equal at everything and at graduation they were both awarded gold watches for having the best records. Unlike Edajima who is bald and wears a haori and hakama, Kumada has a good physique and wears tailcoats. He is a true man who continues to live for fighting and always admits defeat when he loses.
Kyosuke Ijuin (伊集院 京介, Ijuuin Kyousuke)
The representative of Fuun Rakanjuku who becomes Momo's rival. He is at the top of both literary and military arts and greatly admires Kumada. He is a bit conceited and often scoffs at people. He proudly appears in the Gokonsen fourth event, family crest exchange. He immediately requests Momo as his opponent and steals his family crest that he took from a bōryokudan office. They save each other after being shot in the back, and because the point of the match was to test unity, the match is then ended.
Yamitaro (闇太郎)
A Fu'un Rakanjuku student. He is first seen when he attempts to mug Momo, Toramaru, Matsuo, Tazawa, and Hidemaro while they are enjoying a holiday at Hesneyland. He is about as short as Hidemaro, except he also has some skills at Kenpō and taijutsu with a bit of kicking force. He greatly respects Ijuuin.
Hanada Brothers (華田兄弟, Hanada-kyoudai)
Rikishi siblings of the Taitou Heya. They appear in the first event, sumo. The Otokojuku students view them a bit as celebrities, as their father was a former Ozeki and the present master of the Taito Heya. Since childhood they have been raised with special training and are the three years running All Japan Student Sumo Champion. The sumo world has pinned their hopes on them. The older brother fights Toramaru, while the younger faces against Hidemaro.
Hayao Kosashi (小指 駿, Kosashi Hayao)
A marathon expert. He appears in the second event, the marathon. He does not believe in will power, but when Togashi narrowly defeats him at the marathon he changes his mind.
Shinnosuke Kurimoto (栗本 慎之介, Kurimoto Shinnosuke)
A 6th grader who is accepted into university, he is the three years running winner of the National Student Knowledge Exam. He is a prodigy of prodigies with an IQ of 250. He appears in the third event, mathematics, English, and Japanese. He utterly defeats Tazawa in numerical and Japanese-English translation problems. For the final match (chemistry) he builds a high quality radio out of a pile of electrical parts within 2 hours, but Tazawa makes a high-quality robot, resulting in a draw.

== Other characters ==
- Keith Jackson (キース・ジャクソン): Voiced by: Kōzō Shioya An American who is an student from the United States. He is shown to be a respectful guy towards Momo when he speaks Japanese to introduced himself but he is shown to be a distrustful guy towards the Japanese when his friend, Mick Kong shows up. It is known that Kieth was knowledgeable on Japanese culture but he doesn't know that Mick Kong is a racist but he is not. Kieth was later afraid of a particular American student named J comes to Otokojuku showing disappointment to his favourable school. He was punished by J's circle line called the Ring of Crime but was sent back home to America to learn Japanese more next time when he come back to Japan, possibly won't be return.
- Mick Kong (ミック・コング): Voiced by: Masahiro Anzai An African American who is Kieth's friend from America. He has a hatred towards the Japanese despite beginning the US-Japan Relations in Otokojuku. He was known for his cunning but a powerful skill on boxing. He was defeated by Togashi but it is unknown what happened to him (possibly moving back to the United States.) However, the United States have no choice but to serve Mick an extreme punishment for disrespecting the Japanese on the US-Japan Relations in Otokojuku.
- Brian Jones (ブライアン・ジョーンズ): Voiced by: Ginzō Matsuo
- Shura (修羅): Voiced by: Motomu Kiyokawa
- Fuukai (風海): Voiced by: Kōzō Shioya
- Rinkai (林海): Voiced by: Yūji Mikimoto
- Yasha (夜叉): Voiced by: Morihira Murakuni
- J.J. George (J・J・ジョージ): Voiced by: Minoru Inaba An African American boxer who is a huge man who is similar to Mick Kong but with a red shirt. He is a big show-off kind of guy who thinks that all Japanese are stupid people. He really loves Japanese women and he wants to have one as a girlfriend to him but unfortunately, he is defeated by Momo and the Otokojuku gang but it is unknown what happened to George, even if he admitted defeat or he left Japan in disgrace and was sent to be punished in the United States.
- Inoyama (猪山): Voiced by: Tesshō Genda
- Kame (カメ): Voiced by: Hisako Kyōda

== Anime film original characters ==
- B.J. Bruce (B.J.ブルース): Leader of the American team 3S, the semi-finalists of the previous Big Battle August tournament. He is a master of the wind manipulating Hou'ouken (鳳凰拳, Phoenix fist). He fights and is defeated by Momotaro in the final death match. Voiced by: Hideyuki Tanaka
- Sir Royal the 3rd (サー・ローヤル三世): A member of 3S and a snobbish man. He trained in England and uses fencing and billiards in his fights. He fights J to a double KO in the first death match. Voiced by: Kaneto Shiozawa
- Big Morgan (ビック・モーガン): A member of 3S and a short man. He uses Aikido as well as a thin boomerang which he can also ride on. He fights and is defeated by Toramaru in the second death match. Voiced by: Takeshi Aono
- Bronco Sanders (ブロンコ・サンダース): A member of 3S, he trained in Texas and fights using horse riding and a whip. He is a heartless person who abandoned his own horse when it broke its leg. He fights and defeats Togashi in the third death match, but he dies immediately after when the battleground collapses.Voiced by: Masaru Ikeda
- Bill White (ビル・ホワイト): A member of 3S and a large man. He is killed in the blink of an eye when he opposes Bruce. Voiced by: Tesshō Genda
- The Priest: A priest who acts as an official for the Otokojuku/3S death matches. Voiced by: Kenji Utsumi

== Live action film original characters ==
Tange (丹下)
Played by: Masaki Miura. The leader of the Otokojuku second year students. He likes to boss around and abuse the first years. Although a completely different character, he is essentially the replacement for the character Edogawa.
Ryōgoku (両国)
Played by: Hiroshi Ryōgoku. A member of the Kanto Gogakuren.
Shinobu Gokukouji (極小路しのぶ, Gokukouji Shinobu)
Played by: Tomoko Nakajima. Hidemaro's mother. She grows sick of his profligate ways and enrolls him in Otokojuku, hoping it will straighten him out so he can become a proper leader of the Gokukouji family.
Shioya (塩谷)
Played by: Tetsuo Yamada. A member of the Gokukouji group.
Erika (エリカ)
Played by Kaoru Hirata. A girl who Togashi goes out with on his first date.
Ukulele Girl (ウクレレガール)
Played by Ayano Tsuji.
