= Sakigake!! Otokojuku =

Japanese manga series created by Akira Miyashita

- Cover of the first tankōbon volume, featuring Momotarou Tsurugi (front) and the rest of Otokojuku students

魁!!男塾
- Manga
- Written by: Akira Miyashita
- Published by: Shueisha
- English publisher: NA: Renta! (digital); Manga Planet (digital)
- Imprint: Jump Comics
- Magazine: Weekly Shōnen Jump
- Original run: 1985 – 1991
- Volumes: 34
Further information
Anime television series
Directed by	Nobutaka Nishizawa
Produced by	Iriya Azuma; Yoshio Takami
Music by	Shunsuke Kikuchi
Studio	Toei Animation
Original network	Fuji TV
Original run	February 25, 1988 – November 14, 1988
Episodes	34
Anime film
Directed by	Nobutaka Nishizawa
Produced by	Iriya Azuma; Yoshio Takami
Music by	Ichiro Nitta
Studio	Toei Animation
Released	July 23, 1988
Runtime	75 minutes
Manga
Sora Yori Takaku
Written by	Akira Miyashita
Published by	Shueisha
Magazine	Weekly Playboy
Original run	1995 – 2002
Volumes	27
Manga
Akatsuki! Otokojuku: Seinen yo, Daishi wo Idake
Written by	Akira Miyashita
Published by	Shueisha
Magazine	Super Jump
Original run	2001 – 2010
Volumes	25
Manga
Tenkamusou Edajima Heihachi Den
Written by	Akira Miyashita
Published by	Shueisha
Magazine	Oh Super Jump
Original run	2003 – 2010
Volumes	10
Manga
Shiritsu Kiwamemichi Kōkō 2011
Written by	Akira Miyashita
Published by	Nihon Bungeisha
Magazine	Weekly Manga Goraku
Original run	2011 – 2012
Volumes	3
Manga
Goku!! Otokojuku
Written by	Akira Miyashita
Published by	Nihon Bungeisha
Magazine	Weekly Manga Goraku
Original run	April 4, 2014 – November 25, 2016
Volumes	8
Manga
Shin!! Otokojuku
Written by	Akira Miyashita
Published by	Nihon Bungeisha
Magazine	Weekly Manga Goraku
Original run	December 9, 2016 – April 26 2019
Volumes	6
Original net animation
Sakigake!! Reiwa no Otokojuku
Directed by	Frogman
Written by	Naotoshi Nakajima; Frogman
Music by	Kyōhei Matsuno
Studio	DLE
Released	December 18, 2023 – present
Live-action film
Be a Man! Samurai School

Sakigake!! Otokojuku (Japanese: 魁!!男塾; lit. 'Charge!! Men's Private School'), also known as simply Otokojuku, is a Japanese manga series written and illustrated by Akira Miyashita. It was originally serialized in Shueisha's Weekly Shōnen Jump from 1985 to 1991. It is staged in an all-boys school that teaches how to be true men. The students are trained to "revive the Spirit of Japan" and mainly engage in events where they will polish their manhood and push through with their guts.

== Plot ==
The principal of the private school, Heihachi Edajima, was a war hero during World War II. He trained his students to play an active role in politics, economics and industries in Japan and all over the world, though the way of training is highly anachronistic.

The martial arts depicted in this series are also highly choreographed using various forms of martial arts.

== Story ==
=== Early Gag Manga Arc ===
The strongest of the Otokojuku first years, Momotaro Tsurugi, while enduring the strict training of the instructors and the second years, resolves the problems of the other first years with wisdom, kindness, and a manly spirit.

=== Kyoura Daiyon Kyousatsu Arc ===
The budget of Otokojuku falls into the red, so Edajima devises to throw the Gakuensai (愕怨祭) festival in order to collect profits. However just as the festival reaches a climax, Omito Date and his Kanto Gogakuren attack. When they are unable to settle the dispute through Otokojuku's specialty matches, Edajima suggests the Kyoura Daiyon Kyousatsu (驚邏大四凶殺, The 4 Great Astonishing Assaults). Date and the Gogakuren agree and the battles take place on the sacred Mt. Fuji.

=== Dai Ishin Pa-Lien Seiha Arc ===
After the conclusion of the Kyoura Daiyon Kyousatsu, Momo descends the mountain to find his friends still alive. Their joyous moment is interrupted when they are called out by the third years. They then head to Tendo Shrine to face the third years in the Dai Ishin Pai-Lien Seiha (大威震八連制覇, Great Pa-Lien (Unified Eight) Quaking Conquest).

=== Tenchou Gorin Dai Bukai Arc ===
After the Pa-Lien Seiha is ended, Momo and the gang are called to the headmaster's room. There they are shown a war film about how the US Army discovered a skillfully disguised Japanese Army secret base and destroyed it. When some of the students doubt this, Edajima tells them of a man who held a position in the US Army. That man's name was Takemitsu Isa, now known as Hyoei Todo. The students now wish to attack this inhuman Todo, so they participate in Tenchou Gorin Dai Bukai (天挑五輪大武會, Challenge the Heavens Olympics Great Tournament) which he sponsors.

=== Battle of the Seven Tusks Arc ===
One month after the Tenchou Gorin, Momo and the gang welcome the newly enrolled students. During Momo's fight over his title as representative with new first year Souji Togo, an incident occurs in the headmaster's room. Despite his overwhelming fighting power, Edajima suffers a defeat before a capture gun strong enough to take down an elephant. He is kidnapped and his assailants escape into the air. The students then set out for the Battle of the Seven Tusks (七牙冥界闘, Batoru Obu Sebun Tasukusu) in order to rescue Edajima.

=== Fuun Rakanjuku Arc ===
Edajima's lifelong rival Kinzo Kumada creates another Otokojuku called Fu'un Rakanjuku (風雲羅漢塾, Wind and Clouds Arhat Private School), and as they agreed upon thirteen years ago, Otokojuku and Rakanjuku compete against each other in the Go Konsen (五魂遷, 5 Spirit Transitions) match.

== Media ==
=== Manga ===
Sakigake!! Otokojuku was serialized in Shueisha's shōnen manga magazine, Weekly Shōnen Jump from Issue 22 of 1985 to Issue 35 of 1991. The series was collected in 34 collected volumes published under the Jump Comics imprint.

Renta! holds the digital rights for the manga. As of August 2018, they had released the first 3 volumes. The digital rights are also held by Manga Planet.

==== Spin-off works ====
By Akira Miyashita

- Sora Yori Takaku (天より高く; lit. 'Higher than the Sky'): A manga about two heavenly deities contesting for the succession of their father's throne. Edajima and several of the students make cameos, having graduated and moved on to their careers.
- Akatsuki!! Otokojuku: Seinen yo, Taishi wo Idake (曉!!男塾 青年よ、大死を抱け; lit. 'Daybreak!! Men's Private School: Men, Embrace the Great Death'): Set over 10 years after the conclusion of Sakigake!! Otokojuku, this manga focuses on Shishimaru Tsurugi, son of Momotaro Tsurugi from the previous series, and a new generation of Otokojuku students, while still featuring much of the same school staff. Like Sakigake!!, the plot focuses on the hellish training of Otokojuku, fighting enemies, and the births of new friendships.
- Tenkamusou Edajima Heihachi Den (天下無双 江田島平八伝; lit. 'Peerless: The Legend of Heihachi Edajima'): On Edajima's restless childhood and youthful days.
- Ōkouchi Minmeimaru Hyōden (大河内民明丸評伝)
- Kenshoku Dōgen Tokkyū Chūbōshi Wang Ta-ren (拳食同源 特級厨房師 王大人)
- Shiritsu Kiwamemichi Kōkō 2011 (私立極道高校2011)
- Goku!! Otokojuku (極!!男塾)
- Shin!! Otokojuku (真!!男塾)

By other authors

- Otokojuku Gaiden Date Omito (男塾外伝 伊達臣人): April 25, 2014–ongoing; by Tomokazu Ozamatsu; 5 volumes
- Otokojuku Gaiden Kurenai!! Onnajuku (男塾外伝 紅!!女塾): January 23, 2015–ongoing; by Michi Saitou; 5 volumes
- Otokojuku Gaiden Daigouin Jaki (男塾外伝 大豪院邪鬼): May 25, 2015–ongoing; by Tōichirō Yanagida; 4 volumes
- Otokojuku Gaiden Akashi Gōji (男塾外伝 赤石剛次): May 30, 2016–ongoing; by Yuuji Takezoe; 1 volume
- Boku!! Otokojuku (僕!!男塾): October 4, 2017–ongoing; by Satoshi Miyagawa

=== Anime ===
==== TV series ====
Sakigake!! Otokojuku was adapted into an anime television series produced by Toei Animation. Directed by Nobutaka Nishizawa, the series aired on Fuji TV from February 25 to November 14, 1988, lasting 34 episodes. The opening theme is Yogorecchimatta kanashimi ni (汚れっちまった悲しみに), while the ending theme is Ikujidai Arimashite (幾時代ありまして), both performed by Issei Fuubi Sepia.

===== Episodes =====
No.	Title	Directed by	Original release date
1	"Freedom and Youth? This is the Fabled Otokojuku" "Jiyū to Seishun? Koko ga Uwasa no Otokojyuku" (自由と青春? ここがウワサの男塾)	Masami Suda	February 25, 1988
Momotaro Tsurugi enrols at Otokojuku and meets the other First Year students. They have to undergo a physical test through a wooden maze just to get to the school itself. Disgusted at the food they receive Togashi Gengi convinces Tazawa Ippei, Matsuo Taio, Tsubakiyama Kiyomi and Momotaro to escape to his uncle's restaurant. Only Togashi and Tazawa make it there, but are also captured, and get to sample punishment by the Otokojuku Spirit Discipline Rod.
2	"Otokojuku Breaks Loose! We Won't Let Anyone Get in Our Way" "Bakusō Otokojyuku! Oretachi no Mae o Iku Yatsu wa Yurusanē" (爆走男塾! 俺達の前を行く奴は許さねェ)	Yamazaki Noriyoshi	March 3, 1988
The First Years engage in a Forward Marching exercise that takes them through local people's homes and the headquarters of the Pure Evil Group, a local criminal gang which Momotaro overcomes. The group's leader Gokukoji Genzo, sends his son, Hidemaro to seek vengeance on the school and Momotaro. Momotaro defeats their champion and Hidemaro swears to take revenge for his humiliation.
3	"How's the Water? This is Otokojuku's Oil Bath" "E yuda na? Koko wa Otokojyuku。Abura Furo no Yu" (E 湯だな? ここは男塾・油風呂の湯)	Kaneko Hirotoshi	March 10, 1988
The Otokojuku instructors put the students on a strict, and very unpopular diet so two students decide to raid the kitchen. The Instructors are also concerned about the students forming a union. Momotaro takes the blame for the kitchen raid and is put in the Prison of Penitence. Just as Momotaro's punishment is finished, the Pure Evil Group attacks the school. Togashi Gengi volunteers to take Momotaro's place in the Oil Bath of Hell to appease them and suffers a great deal. He does this in return for Momotaro's help earlier. As Hidemaro and the Pure Evil Group leave they are met by uncle Bro Yasha the Assassin assigned to take revenge. Momotaro beats him, and Yasha suggests that Hidemaro join the Otokojuku to develop his manhood.
4	"The Roppongi Skirt-chasing War! We Won't Lose to a Foreigner" "Roppongi Nanpa Sensō! Gaijin ni wa Makerarenai" (六本木ナンパ戦争! ガイジンには負けられない)	Kawasuji Yutaka	March 17, 1988
Instructor Oni-Hige is seen of harassing a woman in the Roppongi district, and is beaten up by George, her huge American boyfriend. For revenge, Oni-Hige then sends the students on a purifying mission in the Roppongi district against dominating foreign men. They find the huge American in a discotheque, but the students find excuses not to fight him, and Oni-Hige is beaten up again. The next day, instructor Rankiryuu orders Hidemaro Genzo who is now a student, to purchase make-up in Roppongi. Meanwhile, the students are punished by having to hold a handstand position for an hour. Hidemaro sees the Americans scamming a local shop assistant and confronts the former WBB heavyweight boxing champion J.J. George but is easily beaten up. The students decide to take revenge, and using a combination of karate and kenpo, Momotaro beats him up. When Yoko, George's Japanese girlfriend, abandons him and approaches Momotaro, he rejects her for being fickle. Note: When Togashi is instructed to translate Japanese in the discotheque, he just shouts some common English phrases that he knows.
5	"Now it's War? The Dangerous Principal Edajima's Dutiless Battle" "Kondo wa Sensōda? Abunai Jukuchō Edajima no Jinginaki Tatakai" (今度は戦争だ? あぶない塾長江田島の 仁義なき戦い)	Junichi Hayama	March 24, 1988
Togashi, Tazawa, Matsuo and Hidemaro decide to test Principal Edajima's skills, but mistakenly attack Oni-Hige instead. For punishment Togashi must do the Boulder Bunny Hop. Oni-Hige takes Tazawa, Matsuo and Hidemaro to Rakkyo University where he accuses the students of pursuing pleasure and fashion. He then suggests that they buy and wear traditional loincloths with Otokojuku logos. When they laugh at him, he orders his students to beat them into submission. They are stopped by the manly Rakkyo University Cheer Squad and held hostage for a 1 million Yen ransom. Principal Edajima decides to rescue them himself. He arrives in a tank and destroys the clubhouse, and when confronted by the police, claims that he's making a movie. He beats up the Rakkyo group, earning the respect and admiration of the Otokojuku students. In the final scene he rides off into the sunset on his tank.
6	"Professional Sumo at Otokojuku: The Dropout Tsubakiyama Vs Oniyokozuna" "大相撲男塾場所 おちこぼれ椿山VS鬼横綱" (Oozumou Otokojyuku Basho: Ochikobore Tsubakiyama VS Oniyokozuna)	Nobuhiro Masuda	April 4, 1988
Tsubakiyama Kiyomi is having trouble coping with the physical rigor of training at Otokojuku and decides to escape at night with his pet canary. He is intercepted by the Second Year student Oniyokozuna and challenged to a contest. The First Year students are woken by the staff at 4am to witness a Spike Thicket Sumo contest between Tsubakiyama and Oniyokozuna. Tsubakiyama is being beaten badly, but when he realises that Oniyokozuna ate his pet canary, he fights back with a vengeance, and with a little help from Momotaro wins the contest. Later, at the grave of his bird, Tsubakiyama is attacked by other Second Year students. As he is being beaten, Momotaro again intervenes and Tsubakiyama finds his strength and courage. He eventually decides not to leave Otokojuku.
7	"What Can You Do to Us, Second Years? Don't Get Cocky Just Cause You're Older" "Nani Suru Monozo 2-gō-sei Toshiue Dakara tte Bannayo!!" (何するものゾ2号生 年上だからってエバんなよ!!)	Masami Suda	April 11, 1988
To take revenge for the defeat of Oniyokozuna, some Second Year students start beating up on First Years. Momotaro stops the First Years from taking immediate revenge as it is against school rules to lift a hand against a more senior student. The First Years are then invited to a Meeting Ceremony with the Second Years. The ceremony consists of a series of humiliating and deadly acts to be carried out by the First Years. Momotaro finally acts and challenges the Second Year acting head Edogawa, beating him with one kick, ending the meeting. When the instructors prepare to expel him, Principal Edajima reminds them that Momotaro did not raise his hand, thus not breaking the rule and will not be expelled.
8	"Otokojuku Goes to the Safari Park: We're the Kings of the Beasts!!" "Otokojyuku Safaripāku ni Iku: Hyakujū no ō wa Ore-tachida!!" (男塾サファリパークに行く 百獣の王はオレ達だ!!)	Yamazaki Noriyoshi	April 18, 1988
Second Year leader Edogawa invites the First Year students to an outing at the Orient Safari Park. The rules are that the First Years must split into groups of three and spend the night in the park with the wild animals. Edogawa dons a gorilla suit to take his revenge on Momotaro, but fails when a lion befriended by Momotaro attacks him. When Edogawa cries for help Momotaro beats him savagely, accusing the gorilla of impersonating Edogawa. The First Years return to Otokojuku unscathed.
9	"The Principal's Fearsome Idea: Starting Tomorrow, You're All Shaving Your Heads!!" "Jukuchō Kyōfu no Omoitsuki: Omae-ra Asu Kara Marubōzuda~a!!" (塾長恐怖の思いつき オマエら明日から丸坊主だァ!!)	Hironobu Saito	May 2, 1988
Following the loss of his last hair, Principal Edajima decrees that all First Years must shave their heads, unless one student can perform the Head Seal. This involves writing the word "man" (男) on the Principal's head. All the attempts by the students fail until Momotaro tricks the principal into putting on a helmet with a stamp on the inside performing the Head Seal. Instructor Oni-Hige then has his own head shaved as the result of losing a bet with Momotaro.
10	"The Second-Years Strike Back: Don't Look Down On Us Cause We're Younger" "2-Gō-sei no Gyakushū: Toshishita no Kuse ni Name n'na ~yo" (2号生の逆襲 年下のくせにナメんなョ)	Junichi Hayama	May 9, 1988
Tsubakiyama chases his pet squirrel onto the Second Years' lawn but balk at punishing him when Momotaro appears. The instructors are concerned at the Second Year's cowardice. Principal Edajima calls back the former head Second Year student, Akashi Gouji to take on Momotaro. On his return he invites the First Year students to a 2nd-Year head's Reinstatement Ceremony. After humiliating the former acting head Edogawa and some First Year students, he engages in a sword fight to the death with Momotaro. The Principal decides to use the fight as an opportunity to stage a public contest on Ganryu Island. The school then sells tickets to raise the necessary funds to pay the school's bills.
11	"Swords Clash on Ganryu Island! Showdown! Momo Vs Akashi" "Ganryūjima ni Shikenmau! Taiketsu! Momo VS Akashi" (巌流島に死剣舞う! 対決!桃VS赤石)	Junichi Hayama	May 16, 1988
On the day of the planned sword contest on Ganryu Island, Momotaro decides that he doesn't want to fight and be part of a tawdry money-raising spectacle. Togashi volunteers to take Momotaro's place, but is outclassed and wounded. When Akashi is about to deliver the killing stroke, Momotaro arrives to represent the First Year students. The battle between Momotaro and Akashi is fierce, but Momotaro uses his own spirit to counteract the Rock-Slicing Sword technique of Akashi and defeats him. Unfortunately the instructors bet all of the ticket money on Akashi and lost the lot, so the school no longer has the money to pay its debts.
12	"A Breakwater Mother Tale, Otokojuku-style: Even Delinquents Need a Mother" "Otokojyuku-ban Ganpeki no Haha Monogatari: Furyō Datte Okāsan ga Hoshī" (男塾版岸壁の母物語不良だってお母さんが欲しい)	Nobuhiro Masuda	May 23, 1988
Togashi is in Harajuku with no money and no girl and rescues an old lady from a thug. She takes him home, mistaking him for her lost son. Togashi goes to leave, but the old lady leads him to believe she has a fortune saved. To get his hands on the money, Togashi buys food and cooks for her, and visits her every afternoon after school. Other students join him as well. Later the thug tells Togashi that she is a drinking, gambling, lying hag so he abandons her. She is then taken by Yakuza to whom she owes money. When she's about to be killed Togashi intervenes but is beaten by the Yakuza. Then Momotaro and the others arrive and rescue them both.
13	"Bloody Boxing? The Enemy is the Super Police Academy" "Chini Somaru Bokushingu? Teki wa Sūpāporisuakademī" (血にそまる撲針愚? 敵はスーパーポリスアカデミー)	Masami Suda	May 30, 1988
Three months after enrolling, the students a Super Police Academy aeroplane drops a group of parachutists into the Otokojuku. Principal Edajima reveals that he has enrolled 30 Super Police Academy for training at the Otokojuku. The leader Keith Jackson brought gifts of chocolate and gum as his father did in the post-war period which infuriates Togashi but the instructors love it. Mick Kong, a huge African American also greets Momotaro, but with a vice-like handshake signalling a less than friendly visit. As tensions between the Japanese and American students rise, Principal Edajima sets up a Picaresque Boxing Match using spiked iron gloves, stating that true friendship is born in battle. The first bout is between Genji Togashi and Mick Kong. Togashi eventually wins after taking a punishing beating.
14	"Friend or Foe? The Man of the Steel Mach Punch Arrives: His Name is J" "Tomo ka Teki ka? Tekken Mahhapanchi no Otoko wa Arawaru: Sono Na wa J" (友か敵か? 鉄拳マッハパンチの男現わるその名はJ)	Yamazaki Noriyoshi	June 6, 1988
The second bout of the Picaresque Boxing Match of Japanese and American students is between Keith Jackson and Gokukoji Hidemaro. Meanwhile another SPA student arrives and is challenged by the Second Year student Akashi. Going by the name of J, he shatters Akashi's unbreakable sword with his magnum steel knuckles, and continues to the boxing stadium. Tazawa coaches Hidemaro but the strategy fails completely and Hidemaro is knocked out of the ring. The score is one win each. Momotaro next enters the ring and is challenged by J. J fells Momotaro with a super fast punch which Momotaro doesn't see. Momotaro then blindfolds himself to use his Mind's Eye to fight. Unfortunately Momotaro is unpracticed in the technique and is not really blind and takes a beating. Akashi cuts Momotaro's eyelids so he really cannot see, and he rejoins the fight. Now blinded, Momotaro's Mind's Eye is opened, and he beats J. Principal Edajima's strategy worked. Following the match, the Americans and Japanese share a bond of friendship, and J decides to stay at the Otokojuku.
15	"Chapter of Mighty Rivals. The Struggle Begins: Otokojuku Vs Great Kanto Student Alliance" "Fūun Ryūko-hen. Shitō Hajimaru。Otokojyuku VS Kantō Gō Gakuren" (風雲竜虎編死闘始まる・男塾VS関東豪学連)	Kaneko Hirotoshi	June 13, 1988
Oni-Hige is put in charge of the school while Principal Edajima goes to Kansai. The instructors see this as an opportunity to make some money to replace the bonuses they have not received. To raise money, Oni-Hige resurrects the School Festival which was banned for 10 years due to many student fatalities. Meanwhile Akashi reveals that the aggressive Kanto Great Student Alliance plans to make Otokojuku the 100th school under their control. Akashi leaves it to Momotaro and the First Years to resolve. A thousand Kanto Great Student Alliance students arrive to take over the school, but Morita, Captain of the Guard says he needs only 30 men to make them surrender. As the battle is about to start, Oni-Hige interrupts and suggests a game of ruby instead, to protect the other visitors and make more money. Oni-Hige poisons the players who must reach the antidote at the other players' end with the steel ball containing a key within 20 minutes or die. The game begins.
16	"All-Out Rugby Showdown. Momo, Bear Your Friends' Tears and Run!!" "Sōryoku Kessen Ragubī! Momo, Tomo no Namida o Seotte Hashire!!" (総力決戦ラグビー. 桃、友の涙を背負って走れ!!)	Junichi Hayama	June 20, 1988
The violent rugby game between the Kanto Great Student Alliance and Otokojuku students begins with an all-out brawl. The Otokojuku students get the ball first, but it is taken by Morita, the Great Student Alliance's Captain of the Guard. He then uses his Linked Iron Axe Whip to clear a path through the Otokojuku students. Momotaro is the last line of defence at the goal line. All the student players begin to collapse from the poison except Morita who did not drink it. Morita attacks Momotaro viciously, but before he can deliver the killing blow, Momotaro strikes back and defeats him. All of the students recover because instead of poison, Oni-Hige had given them anaesthetic. When Rankiryuu accidentally reveals that the festival takings are going to be kept by the instructors, the Otokojuku students beat them up and Momotaro takes the money to a real charity. Afterwards, the Great Student Alliance's President kills Morita because of his failure.
17	""The Four Great Trials of Terror" Begin. What is on the Sacred Mt. Fuji" ""Kyōra Dai Yonkyō Satsu" Hajimaru. Reihō Fuji ni Nani ga Matsu" ("驚邏大四凶殺"始まる 霊峰富士に何が待つ)	Yamazaki Noriyoshi	June 27, 1988
Date Omito, President of the Kanto Great Student Alliance arrives at the gate of Otokojuku with his students and immediately a fight breaks out between the two groups. Principal Edajima interrupts the fighting and suggests using the Four Great Trials of Terror on Mt. Fuji, involving four representatives from each side to settle the dispute. Otokojuku selects Momotaro, Togashi, J and the fourth member, Toramaru Ryuuji from the Prison of Penitence. Date Omito is joined by the Three Fists of the Great Student Alliance, Raiden, Hien and Gekkou.
18	"Battle in the Sulfur Spring of Tears. The Last of J. This is the Spirit of the Yanks" "Namida no Iōsen no Shitō. J no Saigo. Kore ga Yankī Tamashīda" (涙の硫黄泉の死闘・Jの最期・これがヤンキー魂だ)	Nobuhiro Masuda	July 4, 1988
The Otokojuku group arrive at the Temple of Hell's Treasure at the foot of Mt. Fuji with the four representatives wearing traditional white uniforms. The trial will be in the hands of the temple monks. The eight combatants enter tunnels which lead up Mt. Fuji from where they are guided by giant monks. Each team of four are shackled to a giant steel ball which they must push up the mountain. At four locations on the way, one representative from each team will be unshackled to fight to the death. Their fates will be reflected in eight candles burning at the temple below. J and Raiden are the first to fight at the site of 1,000 degree deadly sulphur springs. Raiden gets the upper hand by attacking and retreating with sharp blades in his shoes until J traps him and delivers his final Mach Punch before they both perish in the sulphur springs. Their two candles are extinguished.
19	"A Real Man Dies Smiling! The Gutsy Togashi Clashes with the Beautiful Man Hien" "Otoko wa Waratte Shinu! Do Konjō Togashi ga Utsukushiki Otoko Hien to Gekitotsu" (男は笑って死ぬ! ド根性富樫が美しき男飛燕と激突)	Takahashi Akinobu	July 11, 1988
With J's death, the three remaining Otokojuku representatives, Momotaro, Togashi and Toramaru carve the initial J on their arms in his memory. The two teams push their giant steel balls to the next site for the battle of the Midair Cliff. Togashi and Hien of the Birdman Fist are the next to fight, dangling in mid-air by holding onto ropes attached to the cliff. Hien has the advantage because of his aerial mobility. Togashi fights a desperate battle, but eventually succumbs and falls. As he falls a Rising Dragon Wind catches him an updraft, carrying him back up towards Hien, where in a final effort Togashi attacks Hien and they both fall to their deaths. Their two candles are extinguished.
20	"Another Tearful Parting!! The Burning Man Toramaru Dies on the Icy Arena" "Mata Hitotsu Namida no Wakare!! Hyoujyou no Shitōjyou ni Atsuki Otoko Toramaru Shisu" (また一つ涙の別れ!! 氷上の死闘場に熱き男虎丸死す)	Yamazaki Noriyoshi	July 25, 1988
The remaining representatives, Momotaro and Togashi, and Date and Gekkou push their giant steel balls to the next site of the Four Great Trials of Terror, to the Bridge of No Return. They take their steel balls across the narrow bridge, through the Wailing Cave to the Blazing Slab of Ice for the third trial. Toramaru and Gekkou prepare to fight on a melting pinnacle of ice and avoid falling to sharp stalagmites below. After some initial combat, Gekkou attacks with spinning half-moon blades but Togashi manages to withstand the attack. In anger Togashi retaliates with powerful farts. Gekkou's body heats up and reveals Raging Tattoos which turn his body into the hardness of steel. Togashi throws Gekkou onto the ice spikes below but he manages to climb back up and continue the fight. Togashi eventually manages to defeat Gekkou, but they are both crushed by falling ice. Their two candles are extinguished.
21	"The Final Battle: Momo vs. Date: The Countdown to Death Has Begun" "Saishū Kessen. Momo Vs Date, Tsuini Shi E No Byōyomi Ga Hajimatta" (最終決戦・桃vs伊達、遂に死への秒読みが始まった)	Hironobu Saito	August 1, 1988
In the final of the Four Great Trials of Terror, Momotaro faces Date. Principal Edajima arrives at the temple where he reveals that he's the legendary fighter who survived the Four Great Trials of Terror 40 years ago. He brings with him the giant 300kg Unraisable Flag of Otokojuku. Hidemaro volunteers to lift it for Momotaro. Momotaro and Date push their steel balls to the summit to Mt. Fuji for the final contest, The Great Erupting Summit on the Battlefield of Heavenly Cords – asbestos ropes strung across the crater of Mt. Fuj and set alight at the edges. The fight commences, with Momotaro's sword against Date's flexible spear. While Hidemaro struggles to lift the giant flag, Principal Edajima explains why Date was expelled. 3 years ago he accepted a new bullying instructor's challenge to fight to the death and killed him. Hidemaro lifts the flag and the students begin the Great Chime Yell of support Momotaro. After a long fight on the Battlefield of Heavenly Cords, Date manages to impale Momotaro on the sharp horns of his helmet, from which escape is virtually impossible.
22	"Conclusion of the Four Great Trials of Terror: Reunion With Friends! But the Next Enemy Is...." "Kyōrada Yon Kyō Ya Shūketsu. Tomo To No Saikai Shikashi Mō Tsugi No Teki Ga...." (驚邏大四凶殺終結・友との再会しかしもう次の敵が......)	Junichi Hayama	August 8, 1988
The Otokojuku continue the Great Chime Yell of support Momotaro while Hidemaro struggles to hold the heavy flag off the ground. Date still holds Momotaro impaled on the sharp horns of his helmet, but Momotaro won't give up. When Date tries to finish Momotaro, he breaks free and they both end up clinging to the burning ropes. In a final assault, Momotaro cuts Date, and they fall into the Lake of Red Acid which emits noxious fumes. The monks throw down a rope strong enough to support one of them, and the fight continues. Momotaro hears the Great Chime Yell which gives him strength in the final attack to defeat Date. Momotaro starts to carry Date up the rope to safety, but the rope is too weak and Date lets go. Momotaro is declared the winner, but when he is offered the Shadow Scroll of Victory, rejects the hollow honour. Date's candle flame dies. At the temple, the Otokojuku students rejoice, and find that Togashi, J and Toramaru's wounds have been treated and they are still alive. Momotaro emerges and is cheered by the First Years, but Principal Edajima considers their upcoming confrontation with the Third Years.
23	"Invitation to Death from the Third Years: The Next Battleground is the Evil Tendo Shrine!" "San Gō Sei Kara Shi No Shōtai Jō. Kondo No Senjō Wa Ma Miya Takashi Dō Miya" (三号生から死の招待状・今度の戦場は魔宮天動宮)	Yamazaki Noriyoshi	August 15, 1988
Momotaro, Togashi, J and Toramaru are ordered to report to the Head of the Third-Years, Daigouin Jaki at the Tendo Shrine. To get to him the must pass the Corridor of the Deity, filled with booby traps. J goes first and is separated from the others and his feet are encased in concrete by Third-Year Henshouki, Guardian of the Chamber of Hanging Acid. He must prevent a tray of sulphuric acid suspended above his head from falling while being attacked. J builds his anger until he can use his Mach Punch to escape. Next they face Dokugantetsu, Guardian of the Chamber of a Thousand Needles and Togashi takes the lead. Togashi seems driven as he traverses floor spikes and dodges spears for both sides.
24	"The Gutsy Togashi's Tearful Confession! Daigouin Jaki Is My Brother's Murderer" (ド根性富樫涙の告白大豪院邪鬼は俺の兄のカタキ)	Nobuhiro Masuda	August 22, 1988
Togashi continues his passage, while coming under attack from Dokugantetsu, until Daigouin Jaki stops them. He allows the First Years to pass to the third and final chamber. Meanwhile the Third Years look into Togashi's past and find that he wants revenge for the death of his brother. Togashi tells the First Years that three years earlier, his brother was killed by Daigouin Jaki six months after enrolling at Otokojuku, and that he enrolled at the school to take revenge. Toramaru takes the lead against Baron Dieno in the electrified Chamber of Purple Lightning. Toramaru defeats Baron Dieno and the four First Years are allowed to progress, but Togashi locks the others out so he can confront the giant Daigouin Jaki alone. Jaki tells Togashi of his brother's death in the Great Trembling Conquest of the Unified Eight. Togashi attacks him but is easily beaten. He then reveals that he has 10 kg of dynamite strapped to his body, turning himself into a human bomb.
25	"Entering the "Great Trembling Conquest of the Unified Eight": Momo, This Is the Final Battle!" ("大威震八連制覇"に突入桃、これが最終死闘だ)	Takahashi Akinobu	August 29, 1988
Togashi attacks Jaki with the dynamite strapped to his body. He is easily beaten back, but does not give up until Jaki cuts the fuse rendering the dynamite useless. Just as he stabs Togashi, Momotaro, J and Toramaru burst into the room. Momotaro saves Togashi and attacks Jaki but the giant is too strong and too fast. Their match is interrupted by Principal Edajima who announces that the Great Trembling Conquest of the Unified Eight will take place. This is a contest between eight seniors and eight juniors every 3 years. The four First Years will be joined by the four they defeated in the Four Great Trials of Terror, Date, Raiden, Hien and Gekkou, who were saved and treated by the Third Years for this match. The eight Third years will consist of the three Corridor of the Deity Guardians, Henshouki, Dokugantetsu and Baron Dieno, the Four Lords, Rasetsu, Manjimaru, Senku and Eieki. They begin with the Burning Rod Ritual and the scene is set for the battle at 2am in 3 days time.
26	"The Great Wall of the Eight Dragons That Leads To Hell! There's an Entrance, But No Exit!" (地獄へ通ず八竜（ぱーろん）長城入口あって出口なし)	Yamazaki Noriyoshi	September 5, 1988
The group of Eight juniors travel to the location of the Great Trembling Conquest of the Unified Eight contest, the legendary Great Wall of Eight Dragons. Head Priest Wan Ta-Ren tells them that before entering they must perform the ritual of the Life Entrustment Stone. They hold chains which determine the fighting pairs and the fighting order: Raiden with J, Hien with Togashi, Gekkou with Toramaru, Date with Momotaro. The first challenge is in the Forest of a Hundred Magnetic Columns. Raiden and J climb the column, each wearing a magnetic shoe, and with a device to share which can neutralise the magnetic field. At the top, they face Manjimaru and Henshouki.
27	"Raiden Dies: The First Years' Hard Fight! We're Counting on J's Mach Punch!" (雷電死す・苦戦の一号生頼みはJのマッハパンチだ)	Kaneko Hirotoshi	September 12, 1988
J and Henshouki start the match on the Forest of a Hundred Magnetic Columns, but J is outmanoeuvred, so Raiden takes over. Raiden is a match for Henshouki, but is tricked and stabbed by a hidden poisoned blade. He fights on, but succumbs to the stab wounds and the poison. J takes over and using his Mach Punch, defeats Henshouki who is then killed by Manjimaru for his failure.
28	"A Messenger from Heaven? A Million Reinforcements: Come to the Desperate J!" (天からの使者?絶体絶命のJに百万の援軍が来た)	Junichi Hayama	September 19, 1988
J must now face Manjimaru. Head Priest Wan Ta-Ren says J has no chance against Manjimaru who has mastered the Evil Spirit Fists' Hundred-Man Poison Trial. In the first contact Manjimaru breaks J's left fist. Then an obscuring mist closes in favouring Manjimaru. Far below, the First Years try to raise the legendary Otokojuku Great Kite of Prayer but it fails to lift. J defensively retreats to the last column, prepared for a last attack which Manjimaru launches from above. They clash and both strike deadly blows. The Otokojuku First Years manage to launch the kite with Hidemaro on board who yells encouragement to J. J realises that he's fighting for them all and removes his knuckle Duster and strikes with his faster Flash Piston Punch. Manjimaru is badly wounded, but attacks again. J forces himself to use the Flash Piston Punch again and finally defeats Manjimaru. He descends carrying Raiden with him and attributes the win not to himself, but to all the First Years.
29	"The Bridge That Went To Long: Tazawa and Matsuo Die at the Great Wall of the Eight Dragons!" (遠すぎた橋 田沢 松尾 八竜長城に死す)	Masami Suda	September 26, 1988
The Great Trembling Conquest of the Unified Eight contest moves to the second gate while J gets medical attention. Unfortunately the wall is broken preventing the First Years group progressing. Tazawa gets the students from a human bridge across the gulf so they can continue. Tazawa and Matsuo are the last of the human bridge to climb to safety, but cannot hold on so they let go to fall to their deaths rather than take anyone with them. Dokugantetsu and Senku prepare to meet the First Years and avenge the loss of the first round. The First Years pay tribute to their fallen comrades, Tazawa and Matsuo.
30	"Hien's Agony! The Steel Yogo Mercilessly Attacks the Handsome Man" (飛燕の苦闘・鋼鉄のヨーヨーが容赦なく美男子を襲う)	Nobuhiro Masuda	October 17, 1988
The Otokojuku group reaches the statue of the Dragon War God, but only the six warriors to fight in the Great Trembling Conquest of the Unified Eight contest can proceed further. They reach the Ladder and Basin of the Dragon where Togashi's brother perished 3 years earlier. Only two combatants can fight at a time on the weak timber ladder bridge suspended above a basin of nitrous sulphuric acid. Togashi and Hien face Dokugantetsu and Senku. It is Hien and his Birdman Fist vs Dokugantetsu and his spinning blade disc. Dokugantetsu gets the upper hand, but when he is about to finish Hien Togashi gives him moral support via a Battle Blood Reinforcement and Hien rallies to keep fighting. Even when it appears that he has lost, Hien turns the tables and leaves Dokugantetsu suspended by a rope above the acid. Without pity, Senku cuts the rope and sends Dokugantetsu into the acid basin. Rather than switch out with Togashi, Hien stays on the wooden bridge and confronts Senku.
31	"Round Four Has Begun! Finally Daigouin Jaki Takes the Stage!" (勝負はついに第四闘へ いよいよ大豪院邪鬼が登場)	Yamazaki Norioshi	October 24, 1988
Senku attacks Hien with his Thousand-Streak Mounted Wire Fist technique, using fine, flesh-cutting wires. Hien battles valiantly, and risks everything in a final attack in which he is fatally wounded, but also inflicts a heavy wound on Senku, giving Togashi an advantage. Meanwhile Tazawa and Matsuo are found alive by Principal Edajima who fills them in on the battle so far. Togashi's Brawling Fighter Style defeated Senku but left him in a critical condition. Round 3 was Rasetsu and Baron Deino vs Toramaru and Gekku. Gekku switched out with Date, and the battle was carried out at the Six Blazing Polar Stars. Date easily defeated Deino but Rasetsu was stronger, and Toramaru sacrificed himself to save Date. Toramaru was heavily wounded, but burning with rage, Date defeated Rasetsu. Then Momotaro and Gekkou faced Jaki and Eikei. Gekkou saw through Eikei's attacks, but was eventually mortally wounded by him. Eikei was then challenged by Momotaro who mortally wounded him with his own poisoned hand but who was then killed by Jaki. Before Jaki and Momotaro can commence to fight, Principal Edajima decrees that the contest will be held in the Battle of Crooked Balances.
32	"The Final Battle! First-Years vs Third-Years! They're the Ones Who Will Die!" (最終死闘・1号生vs3号生 死ぬのはヤツらだ)	Junichi Hayama	October 31, 1988
The final round, Battle of Crooked Balances, is to be fought on the summit of Mt. Tengatutou. Each group of students is put into a cage suspended above the valley, and the keys are swallowed by the opposing combatants Momotaro and Jaki. To free their friends, the victor will have to remove the key from the loser's body before the cage fallsinto the valley. Jaki attacks with his Deadly Wind Wave but Momotaro is evasive, reserving his energy and gathering his Ki. Momotaro focuses his Ki into his headband making a Stiff Cloth Fist Breaker, repelling Jaki's attack. As The battle wears on, Momotaro exhausts his Ki and is worn down by Jaki's attacks using his Spinning Weight Wire. Eventually Momotaro manages to catch the spinning weight, and throws it into the sky where it is struck by lightning which electrocutes Jaki.
33	"Friendship and Victory! Those Who Were Left After the Great Trembling Conquest of the United Eight..." (友情そして勝利 大威震八連制覇が残したもの...)	Nobuhiro Masuda; Junichi Hayama	November 7, 1988
Jaki is still not dead, but mortally wounded. He concedes defeat to Momotaro and plunges his hand into his own body to retrieve the key to free the First Years. The Third Years are about to plunge to their deaths, but Momotaro coughs up the key to their cage so that they can also be freed. He says there are no longer First Years and Third Years, just Otokojuku students. With the death of all of the Third Year contestants, the First Years are declared winners, however Momotaro and the other students feel that it was a waste of human life and blood. In response Principal Edajima just repeats his mantra" I am the Principal of Otokojuku, Edajima Heihachi!" Hien, Gekkou and Raiden appear from the shadows, healed by the skill and Chinese medicine of Head Priest Wan Ta-Ren. Togashi can finally farewell his brother after learning of his fate, and avenging his death.
34	"Farewell, Otokojuku! Refine Your Manhood with Courage and Guts!" (さらば男塾 勇気と根性で男を磨け)	Nobuhiro Masuda	November 14, 1988
A month later, and almost a year since they enrolled, Momotaro, Togashi, J and Momotaro reminisce over the year's events. They meet Upperclassman Akashi who congratulates Momotaro on his success in the Great Trembling Conquest of the Unified Eight contest and says his time at Otokojuku will refine his manhood. In the final scene the whole school honors them, including Principal Edajima.

==== Movie ====
An animated movie was released on July 23, 1988. It tells the story of a team of First Year students led by Momotaro Tsurugi who journey to America to compete in a tournament known as Great Battle August, adjudicated by a priest. Following an elimination round, 4 of the Otokojuku must fight 1 on 1 matches with members of the American team 3S; B.J. Bruce, Sir Royal the 3rd, Big Morgan and Bronco Sanders. The Otokojuku eventually win the match.

==== ONA ====
An original net animation spin-off series produced by DLE, titled Sakigake!! Reiwa no Otokojuku, premiered on Twitter, YouTube, and TikTok on December 18, 2023. The series is directed, produced, edited and written by Frogman, with Naotoshi Nakajima writing scripts alongside Frogman, and Kyōhei Matsuno composing the music.

=== Audio drama ===
After the anime was ended, a two-part audio drama tape was sold, covering the Tenchou Gorin Arc. The same voice cast from the anime was used.

Episodes

- Preliminary League Arc
1. Hien vs. Shuten Doji
2. Jaki Daigouin vs. Zeus
3. Omito Date vs. Ryuuhou
4. Momotaro Tsurugi vs. Shu Kougen
- Finals League Arc
1. Genji Togashi/Ryuuji Toramaru vs. Amon/Unmon
2. Momotarou Tsurugi vs. Pharaoh
3. Gekkou vs. Souketsu
4. Omito Date vs. Ryoukou

=== Live-action film ===
It was adapted on a live-action film in 2008 written, directed by and starring Tak Sakaguchi.

=== Video games ===
- Famicom game – Sakigake!! Otokojuku (released March 3, 1989).
- Game Boy game – Sakigake!! Otokojuku – Meiō-tō Kessen (released August 4, 1990)
- PlayStation game – Simple 2000 – The Dodgeball – Sakigake!! Otokojuku (released August 29, 2002)
- PlayStation 2 game – Sakigake!! Otokojuku (released November 10, 2005)

Playable characters: Heihachi Edajima, Momotaro Tsurugi, Genji Togashi, Ryuuji Toramaru, J, Gouji Akashi, Raiden, Gekko, Hien, Omito Date, Manjimaru, Senkuu, Eikei, Rasetsu, Jaki Daigouin, Pharaoh, Sou Reigen, Gouki Toudou, Hakuhou, Zeus, Shishimaru Tsurugi (secret).

- Nintendo DS game – Jump Ultimate Stars (released November 23, 2006)
- PlayStation 3 game – Sakigake!! Otokojuku: Nihon yo, Kore ga Otoko de aru!! (released February 27, 2014)

Playable characters: Heihachi Edajima, Momotaro Tsurugi, Genji Togashi, J, Ryuuji Toramaru, Taio Matsuo, Shinichiro Tazawa, Hidemaro Gokukouji, Gouji Akashi, Raiden, Hien, Gekko, Omito Date, Manjimaru, Senkuu, Rasetsu, Eikei, Dokugantetsu, Henshouki, Baron Dino, Jaki Daigouin, Wang Taren

The series was also represented in four cross-over games: Famicom Jump and Famicom Jump II: The Strongest Seven, both for the Famicom; Cult Jump for the Game Boy; and J-Stars Victory VS for PlayStation 3 and PlayStation Vita. J-Stars Victory VS was ported to PlayStation 4 and released with its two counterparts in Europe and North America, thus representing the first official release of Sakigake!! Otokojuku material outside Japan.

== Reception ==
It is one of the best-selling Weekly Shōnen Jump's manga series of all time as it had sold over 26 million copies.
