= Sasha Paysinger =

American voice actress

- Born: New York, USA
- Occupation: Voice actress
- Years active: 1994–present

Sasha Paysinger is a voice actress for ADV Films and Sentai Filmworks for English-dubbed anime titles. Her major roles include Hatoko Kobayashi in Angelic Layer, Asami in Mezzo DSA, Nana in Elfen Lied, Marie in Sister Princess, and Shin in Pretear. When away from voice acting, she has worked as a flight attendant.

== Voice roles ==
- Air - Yakumo (Ep. 4)
- AKB0048 - Atsuko Maeda the 13th
- Angelic Layer - Hatoko Kobayashi
- Aquarian Age: Sign for Evolution - Rumiko Sakamoto
- Azumanga Daioh - Miruchi (Ep. 12)
- Best Student Council - Seina Katsura
- Campione! - Pandora
- Chrono Crusade - Sister Claire
- Coyote Ragtime Show - August
- D.N.Angel - Freedert, Menou Kurashima (Ep. 8), Miho (Ep. 6), Misaki Nishizawa (Ep. 3)
- Divergence Eve - Kotoko-01
- Elfen Lied - Nana
- Gantz - Shiori Kisimoto
- Gilgamesh - The Concierge
- Godannar - Ami (Ep. 26), Luna
- Gravion - Cecile
- Hello Kitty's Animation Theater - My Melody
- Infinite Stratos II - Chloe Chronicle (Ep. 12), Phee (Ep. 8)
- Jing, King of Bandits: Seventh Heaven - Benedictine
- Kaleido Star - Luci Robbins, Mila (Ep. 14)
- Madlax - Eric's Sister
- Maburaho - Elizabeth
- Megazone 23 - Mai Yumekanou
- Mezzo DSA - Asami Igarashi
- Misaki Chronicles - Kotoko-02
- Momo: The Girl God of Death - Mai Makihara (Ep. 1)
- Nanaka 6/17 - Kuriko Aratama
- Outbreak Company - Romilda Gardo
- Pani Poni Dash! - Misao Nanjo
- Pretear - Shin
- Princess Tutu - Lilie
- Puni Puni Poemi - Ms. Ishii
- Saint Seiya - Miho (ADV Dub)
- Saiyuki: Requiem - Kanan
- Sister Princess - Marie
- The Super Dimension Fortress Macross - Mei
- UFO Ultramaiden Valkyrie - Nanna (OVA 4)
- UQ Holder! - Nodoka Miyazaki
- Utawarerumono - Aruruu
- When Supernatural Battles Became Commonplace - Chifuyu Himeki
