= Master of Mosquiton =

Japanese manga series

マスターモスキートン (Masutā Mosukīton)
- Manga
- Written by: Satoru Akahori; Hiroshi Negishi
- Illustrated by: Tsutomu Isomata
- Published by: Kadokawa Shoten
- Magazine: Dragon Jr.
- Original run: September 1996 – November 1998
- Volumes: 4
- Original video animation
- Directed by: Yusuke Yamamoto
- Written by: Satoru Akahori (#1–2); Katsuhiko Takayama (#3–4); Sumio Uetake (#5–6)
- Music by: Osamu Tezuka
- Studio: Radix
- Licensed by: NA: ADV Films (Expired) AnimeWorks
- Released: November 21, 1996 – December 26, 1996
- Runtime: 30 minutes per episode
- Episodes: 6
- Anime television series

Master of Mosquiton '99
- Directed by: Hiroshi Negishi
- Written by: Sumio Uetake; Takao Ohyama
- Music by: Osamu Tezuka
- Studio: Zero-G Room
- Original network: TV Tokyo
- Original run: October 1, 1997 – March 25, 1998
- Episodes: 26
- icon

Master of Mosquiton (Japanese: マスターモスキートン, Hepburn: Masutā Mosukīton) is a Japanese manga series written by Hiroshi Negishi and Satoru Akahori and illustrated by Tsutomu Isomata about a girl named Hitomebore Inaho whose grandmother was in love with a vampire. Inaho meets a vampire at an all-girls Catholic high school. The manga was adapted into a 1996 original video animation series and was re-imagined into a 1997 anime television series.

== Story ==
To obtain the "O-parts" that are said to hold the power of immortality, Inaho, the daughter of the Hitomebore family, revives the vampire Mosquiton and makes a "blood contract". Mosquiton ends up living with Inaho, who is bossed around by her selfishness, and the two begin an adventure to find the O-parts.

== Characters ==
Alucard von Mosquiton (アルカード・フォン・モスキートン)
Voiced by Takehito Koyasu
Inaho Hitomebore (イナホ・ヒトメボレ)
Voiced by Yuka Imai, Ikue Otani (childhood)
Honoo (ホノオ)
Voiced by Yuji Ueda
Yuki (ユキ)
Voiced by Michiko Neya
Count Saint-Germain (サンジェルマン伯爵)
Voiced by Kazuki Yao
Rasputin (ラスプーチン)
Voiced by Masaru Ikeda
Camille Inaho Camilla (カミル・イナホ・カミーラ)
Voiced by Hiromi Tsuru

== List of Episodes ==
Episode number	Subtitle	Script	Storyboard	Direction	Chief animation director
Episode 1	London Panic! (倫敦大混乱!)	Akahori Satoru	Yusuke Yamamoto		Takuya Saito
Episode 2	Satellite Float (遊星浮遊)	Uetake Sumio	Tatsuya Ishihara		Umetaro Saitani
Episode 3	Ocean Encounter (南洋遭遇)	Satoru Akahori	Takaaki Ishiyama	Tetsuya Kobayashi	Kazuya Kuroda
Episode 4	Shanghai Triangle (上海三角関係)	Katsuhiko Takayama	Takaaki Ishiyama	Yoshiaki Matsuda	
Episode 5	Versus Night (決闘前夜)	Sumio Uetake	Yusuke Yamamoto	Yorifusa Yamaguchi	Hotaru Jumonji
Episode 6	Lonely Time (永遠の時)	Sumio Uetake	Yusuke Yamamoto	Yorifusa Yamaguchi	Takahashi Hideki

== Television Broadcast ==
November 1996, an edited version of the OVA was broadcast on Kyoto Broadcasting System KBS Kyoto. Akahori Satoru appeared at the beginning to give an explanation of the work, and after the main story ended, a prize giveaway was announced.

== Manga adaptation ==
Master Mosquiton (original story by Akahori Satoru and Negishi Hiroshi, illustrated by Isomata Tsutomu, published by Kadokawa Shoten, 4 volumes in total)

- Volume 1 (published in 1997)
- Volume 2 (published in 1998)
- Volume 3 (published in 1998)
- Volume 4 (published in 1999)
