= Divergence Eve =

Japanese anime television series

ダイバージェンス・イヴ (Daibājensu Ivu)
- Genre: Adventure, horror, science fiction
- Anime television series
- Directed by: Jun Takada (Chief); Hiroshi Negishi
- Produced by: Katsuhiro Kikkawa; Katsuya Morita; Maki Horiuchi; Motoki Ueda; Toshio Hatanaka; Tsuneo Takechi
- Written by: Toru Nozaki
- Music by: Yosuke Hoga
- Studio: Radix Ace Entertainment
- Licensed by: NA: ADV Films (2005–2009) Sentai Filmworks (2013-07-18–)
- Original network: AT-X, Tokyo MX
- English network: UK: Rockworld TV; US: Anime Network
- Original run: July 2, 2003 – September 24, 2003
- Episodes: 13

Divergence Eve (ダイバージェンス・イヴ, Daibājensu Ivu) is a thirteen episode Japanese anime television series created by Takumi Tsukumo and directed by Hiroshi Negishi, with production by Operation EVE and animation production from Radix Ace Entertainment.

The series is a science fiction story set in the far future, incorporating aspects of space opera. The character-driven storyline focuses primarily on the psychology of the main character, her social interactions, her inhuman abilities, and the conspiracy surrounding them. The technology is often secondary to this, but it is not ignored; several aspects, including their means of faster-than-light travel, are explained and loosely based on modern physics.

The series was a hit in Japan, which led to the creation of a sequel, Misaki Chronicles, which also ran for 13 episodes.

In North America, the television series was initially licensed by ADV Films and was released in three volumes on VHS and DVD. Sentai Filmworks re-released the series in a box set, including Misaki Chronicles.

== Plot ==
In the year 2017, a satellite on Earth detects a gravitational imbalance in the direction of Lyra, initially believed to be a black hole. Its suspicious X-ray emissions are subjected to noise removal algorithms, revealing the voice message recorded aboard a fictional future Voyager spacecraft, still in the Solar System. Before the cause can be determined, additional identical signals are detected throughout the year from other distant gravity-based phenomena. This is considered proof of faster-than-light travel, and the wormhole responsible is pinpointed to be in the core of Saturn's moon Titan. By temporarily entering a baby universe still in a state of cosmic inflation, the signal was able to bypass the known laws of physics and travel at infinite speed. The wormholes themselves became known as Inflation Holes.

Human travel follows almost two centuries later in 2197. With a tunnel dug into Titan's depths, and a prototype Inflation Drive on board, two astronauts make the first crewed faster-than-light voyage, traveling almost three parsecs. Further exploration of Inflation Holes finds a planet 10 parsecs away with a wormhole core similar to Titan's, formerly inhabited by an extinct alien species. The planet is in a bizarre "apple core" shape, with all of the equatorial planetary mass consumed by frequent alien use of Inflation Drive technology. Three giant longitudinal rings surround what is dubbed as the Quantum Core, and ruins exist upon the fragmented Core itself, but electromagnetic radiation inside the Core is severely limited, making exploration slow and difficult.

By 2246, a base has been built on the planet and dubbed Watcher's Nest. A 12-member expedition is in progress when an unscheduled arrival is detected by command, but the expedition is already inside the Core and radio signals cannot reach them to deliver the recall order. The expedition team thereby encounters their first Ghoul and are wiped out. Later encounters also follow. Autopsies in 2252 by a group called Alchemy reveal artificial genetic modifications, and these genes become the main focus of research into the Ghoul. When applied to monkeys, the genes expand the scope of the animal's senses, but scientists cannot determine how or why.

After two decades of research, by 2272, one of the lead scientists, Doctor Kessler, is frustrated with the project's slow progress on animals. Believing the gene sequences to be a message from an advanced alien species, he leads the effort to begin creating genetically modified humans, to witness the effect on humans as the Ghoul intended. In 2275, Alchemy objects to the use of human guinea pigs, and officially shuts the project down—but not before at least one test subject and one of the only successful Human/Ghoul hybrids is removed by persons unknown.

== Characters ==
=== Probationary pilots ===
Misaki Kureha (紅葉 みさき, Kureha Misaki)
Voiced by: Yumi Kakazu (Japanese); Kira Vincent-Davis (English)
Main character of the series, Misaki is the 18-year-old Japanese daughter of a former officer who served and died on Watcher's Nest. Her klutziness and inability to do anything right is the show's main source of comic relief, and her cheery demeanor is one of its primary means of relaxing the tension. She joined the army for lack of a better job, and despite her glaring flaws, she was somehow selected as a Seraphim elite cadet.
At first, Misaki's selection as a cadet seems unlikely or contrived; she seems completely out of place among the other three pilots. She has far less experience, and while she isn't depicted as stupid or even foolish, she simply has very little innate ability and has trouble acquiring it. In the subsequent training, she fails miserably where everyone else succeeds.
This apparent contradiction is quickly resolved, though. It becomes clear that in times of overwhelming fear or pressure, Misaki's latent abilities allow her to succeed where the others fail, including battling the Ghoul head-on. Further, it seems those responsible for selecting and training the pilots knew this all along, and that Misaki is clearly the entire reason they're doing it at all.
It is eventually revealed that she is a Human/Ghoul hybrid, as her father was one of Alchemy's Ghoul test subjects when he was younger long before he conceived Masaki with her mother. Because of this, Masaki is able to transform into Ghoul-like creature in time when she is in a state of extreme emotion. In this form she is able to battle the Ghoul on much equal(if not superior) footing. This also seems to give Masaki near-godlike time abilities, specifically shown more in the second series.
Luxandra Frail (ルクサンドラ・フレイル, Rukuzandora Fureiru)
Voiced by: Reiko Takagi (Japanese); Christine Auten (English)
Luxandra's original goal was to be an astronomer. While working towards this, she found herself caught in a near-deadly encounter when an asteroid struck her passenger ship en route to Jupiter, contaminating it with an unknown virus. She escaped with facial scars, but declined to have them removed as a reminder of her new decision—to become a soldier, one who would put her life on the line to save others, as she herself was saved. She idolizes Lyar in this respect. Frail shows immense prowess in combat and is the only one of the primary characters from Misaki's force group to have formal training before coming to Watcher's Nest; as such she is both competent and level-headed. She is incredibly supportive of Misaki to the point of being somewhat motherly; she clearly understands that she was once an inexperienced rookie herself and sympathizes with her. Sadly during an incident in space Luxandra is eaten alive by a ghoul.
Suzanna Bluestein (スサーナ・ブルースタイン, Suzāna Burūsutain)
Voiced by: Sanae Kobayashi (Japanese); Emily Carter-Essex (English)
As the daughter of a British family with a long history in the military, Suzanna was expected to hold up that tradition. For a time, she did: At age 18, she finds herself aboard Watcher's Nest as another of the four pilot candidates. As training and tests continue, her skills make her the primary replacement candidate. However, when first put to the test to determine her compatibility with the Integral System sensor and control interface, she panics and fails. Although not a permanent setback, it prompts her to reconsider her career, and she finally decides to pursue her true calling in engineering rather than the military. Several years of her memory are wiped, and she leaves the series with no recollection of the others. Suzanna reappears later in the series with no memory of the others; she works as a maintenance technician in the civilian wards of Watchers' Nest.
Kiri Marialate (キリ・マリアレーテ, Kiri Mariarēte)
Voiced by: Fumie Mizusawa (Japanese); Jessica Boone (English)
Not much is currently known about Kiri except that she is an 18-year-old New Zealander with martial arts training. She joined Seraphim in order to become strong and protect the weak. Of the four candidates, she appears the steadiest and has the strongest sense of humor.

=== Crew ===
Lyar Von Ertiana (ライアー・フォン・エルティアナ, Raiā Fon Erutiana)
Voiced by: Reiko Kiuchi (Japanese); Shelley Calene-Black (English)
A gifted commander and pilot from Germany, Ertiana's goal is to be married by age 30, despite already being 29 and having no current prospects. She was placed in charge of Seraphim and supervises the new cadets, but unofficial word is that she is to be promoted to Lieutenant Commander and transferred out to command headquarters so that her experience may be put to better use. Hence, the four cadets are reportedly being sent in as candidates to replace her, and trained to that effect. Lyar is eventually promoted in Tragedy of Cherubim, but she has so far continued to serve on Watcher's Nest. Lyar despises LeBlanc, continually suspicious that the head of Alchemy knows far more about the extra-temporal monsters known as the Ghoul than he lets on.
Wolfgang Woerns (ウォルフガング・ヴェルンス, Worufugangu Verunsu)
Voiced by: Ikuya Sawaki (Japanese); John Tyson (English)
Commander of Watcher's Nest, German officer Woerns is rarely seen without a serious scowl. Given the limited success in containing the Ghoul so far, he is charged with the difficult and thankless duty of simply holding out as long as he can. At age 50, there are rumors that he's considering Ertiana to replace him, despite threatening her with discipline when she has trouble containing Misaki's nervous breakdown.
Jean Luc LeBlanc (ジャン・リュック・ルブラン, Jan Ryukku Ruburan)
Voiced by: Takehito Koyasu (Japanese); Jason Douglas (English)
Known to Bernard as Professor Je Labelle, this high-ranking French member of Alchemy remains a mysterious character. Even Prim does not always understand his decisions. He's the driving force behind the scenes of the revived Kessler Project, and considers himself immune to interference—only Woerns outranks him, and the Commander has many problems and few options. An air of conspiracy follows him, in part because he is typically smiling to himself when misfortune strikes. The only event to visibly catch him off-guard was when the Ghoul appeared unexpectedly in episode five ("Seraphim"), revealing itself to the enemy spy Bernard.
Prim Snowlight (プリム・スノーライト, Purimu Sunōraito)
Voiced by: Rina Satou (Japanese); Luci Christian (English)
Prim is a scientist aboard Watcher's Nest and an accomplice to LeBlanc. Her duties include overseeing the Rampart Armors and Integral Systems, repairing Kotoko, monitoring the physical and mental data of the cadets, analyzing data for LeBlanc, and keeping watch on their test subject, Misaki. She follows LeBlanc unquestioningly, but not always happily, expressing secret concern and sorrow for Misaki. Even when she breaks schedule to give all four cadets a day off to recover, her concern seems to be primarily for Misaki. It is revealed later in the series that Prim was the product of genetic engineering, and as such she sees Misaki as a kindred spirit.
Kotoko-01 (コトコ-01)
Voiced by: Miyu Matsuki (Japanese); Sasha Paysinger (English)
The Kotoko-series support android by the same name is nearly always by Lyar's side, both literally and figuratively. Appearing as a ten-year-old girl, she fits the role with her childlike excitement, but is nevertheless shown to be extremely capable of both flying her R.A. and handling a minigun. Even if her body is completely destroyed (as seen in episode 1), she can't truly die since her mind and data are linked to and backed up in Lyar's computer systems which she updates routinely to protect and preserve Kotoko's memories. Her main fault is that her loyalty only extends as far as her programming, a weakness exploited by Bernard when he reprogrammed Kotoko to shoot anyone attempting to pursue him and Misaki. She and Lyar seem to have a sort of older sister/younger sister relationship, and Lyar is often the one who updates Kotoko's programming when the need arises. In terms of fanservice, Kotoko serves to fill the lolicon niche of the series.
Luke Walker (ルーク・ウォーカー, Rūku Wōkā)
Voiced by: Ryûzaburô Ôtomo (Japanese); John Gremillion (English)
Sergeant Walker is the American instructor sent to train the four cadets. He accompanies them to Watcher's Nest, continuing their training under the watch and direction of Lyar. Strict but fair, he is ready to drive the cadets well beyond their tolerance if it makes them tougher the next time. He does not consider himself a babysitter, though, and later refuses to train the unmotivated Misaki until she recovers on her own.
Alice Pauling (アリス・ポーリング, Arisu Pōringu)
The nurse with the pink uniform, seen after Suzanna's memory wiping.
Comrie Rotblat (コムリー・ロートブラット, Comurī Rōtoburatto)
Voiced by: ? (Japanese); Allison Sumrall (English)
The orange-haired technician, seen giving Luxandra her injection.

=== Others ===
Bernard Firestar (バーナード・ファイアスター, Bānāto Faiasutā)
Voiced by: Hiroyuki Yoshino (Japanese); Jay Hickman (English)
Posing as an official reporter for "News of the Galaxy", Bernard arrives in episode five (Seraphim) to spy on Alchemy. He claims his father died with Misaki's in the Tragedy of Cherubim, yet doesn't point him out when showing Misaki the list of those who died. After realizing who and what Misaki is, his duty is to make contact and keep watch on her, and his bonding with her is likely just a means to that end. He incites her to help him steal a craft and download the data from the site of the Tragedy, while LeBlanc surveils him passively. Once Bernard knows too much, LeBlanc shoots him and seizes the useful data, as planned all along.
GHOUL (グール, Gūru)
Voiced by: Ryûzaburô Ôtomo (Japanese); John Swasey (English)
Very little is known about the Ghoul; they are an extra-dimensional (and likely extra-temporal) monster from an alternate universe. They are from a realm inimical to humanity and seem to despise other forms of life, attacking viciously whenever and wherever encountered. They have been seen brutally killing humans (and occasionally eating them, as seen in Episode 10), but they are also known to alter the corpses of those they kill genetically - infecting them with Ghoul tissue and leaving them as animate, timelost undead horrors known as Necromancers.
The Ghoul emerge from the Alternate universe every once and again when Watchers' Nest Inflation Hole is engaged; they appear to emerge from another time as well as another place. The Ghoul, as an extra-temporal, exists in a transient sense, and thus most attacks on the creature have only a small chance to actually affect it since it may not actually exist when a weapon hits them. This renders the Ghoul almost impervious to conventional attack and also means most physical barriers and even body armor are meaningless to the Ghoul, since they can merely phase through a wall or armor. They can also generate weapons-grade energy blasts and their mere presence causes massive electromagnetic disturbances.
The Ghoul, however, have 2 major weaknesses. For one, they can be isolated and forced back to their own timestream using the Quantum Barrier on Watcher's Nest; this instantly sends the Ghoul back to its original realm and proves the most effective means of elimination - however, it is also temporary. The second means involves using advanced technology to guide weaponry to the ideal point when and where a Ghoul will manifest and eliminating it using conventional firepower, via the Integral System. Whilst infinitely harder, success will outright kill a Ghoul and prevent it from returning.
Because the Ghoul are extra-temporal entities, even being in a location that is within a few minutes of where a Ghoul appears can be dangerous. These effects, which occur before and after a Ghoul attack, are known as Specular images. They are disrupted via Quantum Barrier technology; if a Ghoul is eliminated or repulsed, its Specular image ceases to be a threat as well.
The Ghoul seem both fascinated with and terrified of Misaki; when encountering her, the Ghoul often react as if she is a kindred creature and do not harm her - even when she is outright hostile it seems difficult for the Ghoul to move itself to take action against Misaki, because she's a ghoul herself. There have been instances where they have attacked Misaki, but that only happens once the ghouls realize she is a threat to their lives. An example is in the first episode where a ghoul struggling to get free from her grip impales the transformed Misaki with its scorpion-like tail.
In Misaki Chronicles, Seraphim's anti-ghoul technology has grown by leaps and bounds despite there being only a few short days between the two series. Man-portable weapons capable of generating short-lived quantum barriers that are capable of containing the Ghoul for a short time exist, along with energy weapons better-suited for dealing with Ghoul attacks. This enables Eritiana to deal with Ghoul Specular images, and suppress a Ghoul long enough for precision repulsion or elimination with assistance from Rampart Armor units.
Others
Morozov Voiced by: Takehiro Murozono (Japanese); Rick Piersall (English)
Juuzou Kureha Voiced by: Hiroaki Hirata (Japanese); John Swasey (English)
Kessler Voiced by: Nobuo Tobita (Japanese); George Manley (English)
Lieutenant Azevedo Voiced by: Kenichi Suzumura (Japanese); Rick Burford (English)
Nodera Voiced by: Kenichi Suzumura (Japanese); Greg Ayres (English)

== Episodes ==
Divergence Eve takes place on Watcher's Nest, now effectively a giant space station built inside the planet halves with a population of ten million. The first episode is actually set between episodes 12 and 13, but is played first with no explanation in order to build viewer curiosity and provide strong foreshadowing.

No.	Title	Original release date
1	"Mission 2 (Note: This episode has an English title only)"	July 2, 2003
The series begins with a dangerous expedition being sent into the Core. A Ghoul is in the process of materialising, but the station's Quantum Barrier is still being repaired and is unable to contain the process. Prim calls Misaki in for a "final physical", but instead, her brainwaves are synchronised to an unknown artificial intelligence system. She appears to enter her Rampart Armor (R.A.) mecha along with Kiri and Kotoko, and even Lyar, who changes the battle plan to include herself. Three of the pilots are dispatched, but Misaki is unresponsive and remains behind while Prim determines the problem. In the battle that ensues, Kotoko is destroyed(but not truly dead since her mind and memories survive) and Lyar and Kiri are disabled. Misaki finally joins the battle, rescuing them but being caught herself. Facing certain death, she panics, and transforms into a Ghoul-like being that grapples with the Ghoul until both are destroyed in a burst of light known as pair annihilation. Back on the ship, Prim and Jean-Luc seem to be the only ones who know what really happened; they monitor the exhausted real Misaki, suspended in a chamber connected to numerous wires.
2	"Quantum Barrier"; Transliteration: "Ryōshi Shōheki" (Japanese: 量子障壁)	July 9, 2003
The second episode jumps backwards over two months, with the four cadets finishing their training in the Solar System, and Misaki struggling to keep up. The cadets and ship crew settle down for the Inflation Drive trip to Watcher's Nest, but a Ghoul makes the trip at the same time, merging with the ship during transit. The crew remain unconscious, but Misaki reacts violently; the Ghoul then singles her out, and she transforms and grapples with the Ghoul long enough for the Quantum Barrier to purge it from the ship. Misaki is left naked and confused, her uniform destroyed in the process. The ship is boarded and Lyar finds her in this state, but later events suggest she keeps this a secret.
3	"Necromancer"; Transliteration: "Shitai Hei" (Japanese: 死体兵)	July 16, 2003
Training continues, with Misaki worst as usual. But when firearms training switches to live rounds, the other cadets can no longer hit anything, while Misaki's abilities emerge and possess her. She hits every single target, and even avoids the trick civilian target at the end. Prim refers to this as precognition and appears to have known all along, but feigns ignorance. In a later training exercise, Misaki's braking thrusters fail, and she crashes into the Core. Her R.A. is attacked by dozens of unknown mechas stationed there, but Lyar launches after her and drives them off. She removes Misaki from the Core, swearing her to secrecy about the enemy mechas.
4	"Specular"; Transliteration: "Supekyura" (Japanese: スペキュラー)	July 23, 2003
Prim suggests that the cadets get their first day off. They tour the residential area by day, and Misaki later encounters a young mute girl in an alley drawing a life-sized Ghoul mural, traumatised by a past encounter. Meanwhile, a Ghoul has been materialising in the Core; though contained, it sends out a Specular Image, attacking Misaki and the girl with a remote version of itself. Misaki nearly transforms again, but is snapped out of it by the girl's screams, and the Ghoul is forced away by the Quantum Barrier. Lyar and Kotoko handle the cleanup, removing the girl and again swearing Misaki to secrecy.
5	"Seraphim"; Transliteration: "Serafimu" (Japanese: セラフィル)	July 30, 2003
A scheduled ship from Earth delivers Bernard, and Lyar becomes his escort; she avoids his questions, and Misaki must deny her classified knowledge. When Bernard, Kotoko, and the cadets are later sent on a training mission to the Core, a Ghoul appears with much less warning than usual. The vessel is disabled, losing power just after Lyar gives the urgent order to abandon ship. The ghoul attacks, wounding Luxandra and Bernard, grazing Suzanna, and decapitating Kotoko. After another panic attack, transformation, and standoff between Misaki and the Ghoul, the Barrier again forces it away. Bernard attaches his PDA to Kotoko's severed head, secretly downloading as much data as he can.
6	"Watcher's Nest"; Transliteration: "Uocchazu Nesuto" (Japanese: ウォッチャーズ・ネスト)	August 7, 2003
Bernard undergoes memory altering, but the cadets are only sworn to secrecy, since only Misaki had a face-to-face encounter with the Ghoul. Despite this, they now know the true threat of their enemy. Kotoko is put back together and the training pace is increased, with Suzanna selected as the primary candidate. Her mind rejects the Integral System, the neural sensor interface used to overcome the effects of the Quantum Core, and this setback plus her fear of the Ghoul prompt her to quit and follow her true calling as an engineer. With two years of memory wiped, including her memories of the other cadets, Suzanna is released from service.
7	"Quantum Core"; Transliteration: "Ryōshi Koa" (Japanese: 量子コア)	August 14, 2003
Bernard is gathering data, concealing the failure of his memory wiping; he enlists Misaki's help by suggesting it may reveal her father's fate. They access classified data on the incident that Bernard says killed both their fathers, and steal a ship to visit the site. Prim and LeBlanc are fully aware of these plans from the start, but LeBlanc considers it useful and avoids intervening. The Core's mechas attack, and Misaki holds them off in an R.A. until she falls off the edge. Bernard downloads the data and leaves without her. Inside the Core, Misaki discovers the enemy mechas all have dead pilots inside, and feels her father calling to her, but cannot tell from where.
8	"Alchemy"; Transliteration: "Arukemi" (Japanese: アルメミー)	August 21, 2003
Lyar immediately makes a desperate dive into the core and rescues Misaki. LeBlanc tells Misaki the mechas in the core are known as Necromancer, the army of the dead, and their goal was to capture her. Bernard returns, but has legal immunity; unable to punish him, they spare Misaki as well. Lyar expands the replacement program, accepting all three cadets as pilots. LeBlanc confronts Bernard in his quarters, Bernard realises Alchemy intends to continue the Kessler Project, and LeBlanc shoots him. To test Misaki, he then shows her a transport ship full of corpses and a Ghoul in stasis, and she communicates with the Ghoul, again feeling the call of her father. Afterwards, LeBlanc wipes her memory of the event, dismissing Lyar's angry protests.
9	"Tragedy of Cherubim"; Transliteration: "Kerubimu no Sangeki" (Japanese: ケルビムの惨劇)	August 28, 2003
Lyar is promoted to Lieutenant Commander. The three cadets are promoted to Ensign and given personal sidearms, but immediately assigned mission rotations that keep them separate. On space patrol, Misaki's autopilot fails and sends her into an asteroid field; her abilities possess her and she escapes unscathed, but not before hearing her father's call again. Lyar confronts Prim and LeBlanc, knowing they sabotaged Misaki's ship to study her, but with even Woerns powerless to stop LeBlanc, she vows to do things her own way. The cadets all miss each other, while Misaki is haunted by violent nightmares and hallucinations. She confronts Prim at gunpoint, demanding to know the truth. Lyar and Kotoko arrive and assist her, accessing the data Bernard tried to send to Earth. Misaki had bonded with Bernard, even being kissed once to evade guards, and is devastated to learn of both her own nature and Bernard's blatant manipulation. She empties her pistol into the screen, flees, suffers more hallucinations, and is next seen stealing a ship to escape. Lyar smuggles Kiri and Luxandra on board to console the sobbing Misaki, dispatches the ship, and disguises the incident as an emergency dispatch test. Reunited, the three finally celebrate their promotion.
10	"Divergence Eve"; Transliteration: "Henyō Karada" (Japanese: 変容体)	September 3, 2003
An alarm goes off, signaling everyone there is a GHOUL. Everyone is seen running out, including Luxandra, into a rampart carrier. Kiri arrives a few seconds late, and misses it. Le Blanc uses the information Bernard retrieved to tamper with the laser posts, causing them to malfunction, and not work, along with the fail-safe system. Misaki is doubtful of herself, and flashes back to a memory sequence with all 3 of them celebrating their promotion from Cadet to Ensign rank. Luxandra explains a little about herself, such as how she had to accept the reality of this, and talked about how she admired the people who worked there. Her comment, "Admit it Misaki, even you aren't working this hard. And if you can do it, then why shouldn't I?" rattles throughout her mind. Misaki visits Kiri, who assures her not to worry about Luxandra. She describes her as "one tough lady", and says that no GHOUL would mess with a lady with that scary of a face. The GHOUL, materializing in the core, shoots a blast of energy so powerful, it is off the charts of the Skeleton Crew's power reader. A part of Watcher's Nest along with a few laser posts are obliterated. Lyar Von Ertiana's rampart is partially damaged, and she loses contact with everyone one of the soldiers except Kiri. Lyar relays instructions for both of them to accelerate into the core. Meanwhile, Luxandra, is shown unconscious in her rampart armor on the surface of the core, back on the surface. She wakes up, and gains her surroundings. She is able to move the arm of the rampart armor, as she tries to get back up. A shadowed object is shown walking towards the rampart armor, none other than the GHOUL. It is shown trying to break in, while Luxandra is screaming. The GHOUL breaks in, and begins to eat her alive. The picture taken with all 4 of them together is covered in blood, and the blood that drips off of the rampart armor splashes onto her face, blotting her out of the picture. The GHOUL leaves the scene, and the Specular soon appears in the holding bay of the rampart armors. Misaki, in the holding bay, is seen screaming, and moving her stick handles that control the arms of the rampart armor up and down. The Specular image of the GHOUL is seen walking towards the rampart armor. The GHOUL opens its mouth, and blood is shown in it. Misaki sees visions of what happened to Luxandra, before, during, and after her murder by the GHOUL. The GHOUL is seen about to punch a hole through the RA (Rampart Armor), when an enraged Misaki, in near GHOUL form, catches it with her hand, and turns the GHOUL to stone, killing it. Lyar and Kiri are in the core, apparently searching for something. Kiri comes to find a rampart armor on the ground, and when she discovers the GHOUL, now dead and of stone, she flies back, and starts shooting at it, but stops when she realizes that it's not moving. Lyar asks what's wrong, but Kiri is unable to respond. Misaki is in the infirmary. She had received a shock from what had happened earlier. She hears and sees Luxandra, who tells her she mustn't lose her cheer, or everyone else will. She also lets her know how happy she felt to find out that she really cared about everyone, like the time with Suzanna. She tells her to stay strong, and not to forget her before disappearing.
11	"Designer's Children"; Transliteration: "Dezainazu Chirudoren" (Japanese: デザイナーズ・チルドレン)	September 10, 2003
Misaki is on a Class-C standby and takes the opportunity to visit a place she remembers. Prim catches up with Misaki looking at her father's tomb, and chooses that time to mention the Gate of Truth. Flashback to the events that led up to the current situation. 2017-7-7: signals received. 2197-2-21: Titan. 2246-3-26: Watcher's Nest. 2258-11-13; Alchemy. 2272-6-18: experiments with monkeys. 2299: Humans designed by genetic engineering; birth of Misaki and Prim. The two return to base after meeting Suzanna, who has no memory of them.
12	"Mission 1"	September 17, 2003
Misaki produces an incredible performance during a practice mission, and survives unscathed after a real mission. Kotoko is suspicious, Prim and Jean-Luc talk about possible pair annihilation, and there is a mysterious person in a medical tank.
13	"Mission 3"	September 24, 2003
After all citizens have been evacuated from Watchers Nest, Jean-Luc takes over the abandoned control center and sends Misaki in to the Core to meet the GHOUL. She is basically a wooden puppet until Prim disrupts Jean-Luc's control. Time is rewound to 7 April 2314, back when everyone was on Earth at the Allied Forces Military Academy.
