= Reiko Kiuchi =

Japanese voice actress (born 1968)

- 木内レイコ
- Born: July 10, 1968 (age 58); Tokyo, Japan
- Occupation: Voice actress
- Years active: 1997–present
- Agent: Ken Production
- Notable work: Beet the Vandel Buster as Beet; Digimon Adventure 02 as Daisuke Motomiya

Reiko Kiuchi (木内レイコ, Kiuchi Reiko; born July 10, 1968 in Tokyo) is a Japanese voice actress affiliated with Ken Production.

== Filmography ==
=== Anime ===
- Ashita no Nadja (Kennosuke Tsurugi)
- Beet the Vandel Buster and Beet the Vandel Buster Excellion (Beet)
- Bleach (young Renji Abarai in ep 32)
- Bobobo-bo Bo-bobo (young Bobobo-bo Bo-bobo, Patchibobo)
- Demashita! Powerpuff Girls Z (Shin'ichi, Brick)
- Digimon Adventure (Koromon)
- Digimon Adventure 02 (Daisuke Motomiya, Anna)
- Digimon: Diaboromon Strikes Back (Daisuke Motomiya)
- Digimon: The Golden Digimentals (Daisuke Motomiya)
- Divergence Eve (Ryer Von Eltiana)
- Fullmetal Alchemist (Pharmacist in ep 11, Son in ep 17)
- Futakoi (Keisuke Kosaka)
- Futari wa Pretty Cure (Kiriya)
- Gaiking second series (Puria)
- Getbackers (boy in ep 3, mother in ep 2)
- Hikarian (Okami)
- Hunter × Hunter (1999) (Canary)
- Inuyasha the Movie 4: Fire on the Mystic Island (Roku)
- Kamichu! (Tire God, DVD ep 7)
- Kōchū Ōja Mushiking - Mori no Tami no Densetsu (Chalk)
- Kinnikuman Nisei (young Checkmate, Tamaki Maekawa)
- Konjiki no Gash Bell: 101 Banme no Mamono (Makai elementary school student)
- Major (Natsume)
- Misaki Chronicles (Ryer Von Eltiana)
- Ojamajo Doremi (Toyokazu Sugiyama)
- One Piece (Young Wiper, Jewelry Bonney [2009-2016])
- Pocket Monsters (Piplup)
- Samurai Champloo (Obaasan in ep 19, Oryu in ep 4)
- Simoun (Anubituf; Child in ep 26; Child C in ep 22; Cook A in ep 10, 16, 19; Ground Crew in ep 22; Mamina's Father in ep 7; Man A in ep 26; Passenger in ep 2; Priestess B in ep 21; Shoukoku Soldier B in ep 23; Soldier in ep 19; Trainee 3 in ep 3)
- Street Fighter Alpha: The Movie (Shun)
- The Prince of Tennis (Kevin Smith)
- Wings of Rean (Flussul in ep 3)
- Yume no Crayon Oukoku (unlisted role)

=== Drama CD ===
- Dear (Marianne Claybert)

=== Video games ===
- Halo 2 (Miranda Keyes)
- Super Smash Bros. Brawl (Piplup)
- Rumble Roses (Aisha / Sista A)
- Rumble Roses XX (Aisha / Sista A)
- Unlimited Saga (Norff)

=== Dubbing Roles ===
- Queen Mary (Gunpowder, Treason & Plot)
- Stressed Eric (Mrs.Wilson)
- The Boondocks (Huey Freeman)
