= Ikuya Sawaki =

Japanese voice actor

- 沢木 郁也
- Born: August 25, 1951 (age 75); Chiba, Japan
- Occupation: Voice actor
- Years active: 1976–present
- Agent: Arts Vision

Yoshinobu Mikami (三上 芳信, Mikami Yoshinobu; born August 25, 1951 in Chiba Prefecture), better known by his stage name Ikuya Sawaki (沢木 郁也, Sawaki Ikuya), is a Japanese voice actor who is affiliated with Arts Vision.

== Filmography ==
=== Anime television series ===
- Dirty Pair (1985) (Goolley)
- Kyatto Ninden Teyandee (1990) (Kitsunezuka Ko'on-no-Kami)
- Berserk (1997) as Boscogne
- Turn A Gundam (1999) as Ladderum Kune
- Cyborg 009 (2002) as Dr. Gaia
- Divergence Eve (2003) (Wolfgang Woerns)
- Misaki Chronicles (2004) (Wolfgang Woerns)
- Ouran High School Host Club (2006) (Renge's Father)
- Darker than Black (2007) as Mao
- Darker Than Black: Ryūsei no Gemini (2009) as Mao
- Naruto: Shippuden (2009) as Hanzo of the Salamander
- Kyoukai no Kanata (2013) as Grandfather Nase
- One Piece (2014) as Fujitora (Issho)
- Legend of the Galactic Heroes: Die Neue These (2018) as Gregor von Mückenberger
- Carole & Tuesday (2019) as Hamilton

Unknown date

- The Brave Fighter of Legend Da-Garn (Shuttle Saber, Redlone)
- Flame of Recca (Gashakura)
- Highschool! Kimen-gumi (Gorō Mutsu)
- Red Baron (Kaizer)
- Rurouni Kenshin (Koshijirō Kamiya, Tsuruzaemon)
- Pretty Soldier Sailor Moon SuperS (Ichirō Ōno)
- Saint Seiya (Canis Major Sirius)
- Sakigake!! Otokojuku (Ninja (Tetsu Kabuto), Wang Ta Ren)
- Sexy Commando Gaiden: Sugoiyo! Masaru-san (Takeda-sensei)
- Sorcerous Stabber Orphen (Bagup)
- Star Ocean EX (Ronix J. Kenni)
- Tenchi Universe (Sasami and Ayeka's Uncle)
- Transformers: The Headmasters (Fortress/Fortress Maximus)
- Transformers: Super-God Masterforce (Grand/Grand Maximus)
- Transformers: Micron Legend (Ratchet)
- Yokoyama Mitsuteru Sangokushi (Yuan Shao)
- You're Under Arrest (Inspector Tokuno)

=== Original video animations ===
- Baoh (????) (Number 22)
- Bondage Queen Kate (????) (Boss)
- Gatchaman (1994) (Dr. Kōzaburō Nambu)
- Gunsmith Cats (????) (Roy Coleman)
- Guyver (????) (ZX-Tole)
- Magical Girl Pretty Sammy (1996) (High Priest)
- One Piece - Defeat The Pirate Ganzak! (1998) (Herring, Narration)
- The Deep Blue Fleet (????) (Heinrich von Hitler)
- Ys: Tenkuu no Shinden (????) (Gōban)
- Legend of the Galactic Heroes(1997) (Guzmán)

=== Game ===
- Flash Hiders (1993) (Rablehalt)
- Kunoichi (2003) (Jimushi)
- Kingdom Hearts II (2005) (MCP)
- Ace Combat Zero (2006) (Dietrich Kellerman)
- Metal Gear Solid 2: Bande Dessinee (2008) (Revolver Ocelot)

=== Drama CDs ===
- Last Order (????) (Hiroshi Shiho)

=== Tokusatsu ===
- Kyuukyuu Sentai GoGo-V (1999) (Dark Demon Sword Psyma Beast Solgoil (ep. 4))
- Ultraman Neos (2000) (Narrator)
- Samurai Sentai Shinkenger (2009) (Ayakashi Isagitsune (ep. 17))
- Samurai Sentai Shinkenger vs. Go-onger: GinmakuBang!! (2010) (Tensouder Voice)
- Tensou Sentai Goseiger (2010) (Master Head (eps. 2-5, 10, 12, 16, 18, 22, 24, 29, 32, 45-50), Tensouder Voice, Narrator)
- Tensou Sentai Goseiger: Epic on the Movie (2010) (Tensouder Voice)
- Tensou Sentai Goseiger vs. Shinkenger: Epic on Ginmaku (2011) (Tensouder Voice, Narrator)
- Tensou Sentai Goseiger Returns (2011) (Master Head, Tensouder Voice, Narrator)
- Gokaiger Goseiger Super Sentai 199 Hero Great Battle (2011) (Tensouder Voice)
- Kaizoku Sentai Gokaiger vs. Space Sheriff Gavan: The Movie (2012) (Tensouder Voice)
- Kaitou Sentai Lupinranger VS Keisatsu Sentai Patranger (2018) (Arsène Lupin (ep. 18, 34, 44))

=== Dubbing ===
==== Live-action ====
- Ant-Man (Mitchell Carson (Martin Donovan))
- Australia (Ivan (Jacek Koman))
- Avengers: Doomsday (Hank McCoy / Beast (Kelsey Grammer))
- Cliffhanger (1997 NTV edition) (Kynette (Leon Robinson))
- Crimson Tide (Lieutenant Bobby Dougherty (James Gandolfini))
- Domestic Disturbance (Ray Coleman (Steve Buscemi))
- Don't Breathe (Norman Nordstrom (Stephen Lang))
- Don't Breathe 2 (Norman Nordstrom (Stephen Lang))
- Downsizing (Joris Konrad (Udo Kier))
- Gilda (Det. Maurice Obregon (Joseph Calleia))
- The Irishman (Frank "The Irishman" Sheeran (Robert De Niro))
- Jennifer 8 (Sgt. John "J.K." Taylor (Graham Beckel))
- Matchstick Men (Chuck Frechette (Bruce McGill))
- The Matrix Reloaded (Councillor West (Cornel West))
- The Matrix Revolutions (Councillor West (Cornel West))
- Miracles (Tiger (Ko Chun-hsiung))
- The Monuments Men (2nd Lt. Donald Jeffries (Hugh Bonneville))
- Mortal Engines (Governor Kwan (Kee Chan))
- Painted Faces (Wah (Lam Ching-ying))
- The Perfect Host (Warwick Wilson (David Hyde Pierce))
- Predator 2 (Detective Danny Archuleta (Rubén Blades))
- The Quiet Man (2017 Star Channel edition) (Father Peter Lonergan (Ward Bond))
- Rough Magic (Doc Ansell (Jim Broadbent))
- Sonic the Hedgehog (Commander Walters (Tom Butler))
- Sonic the Hedgehog 2 (Commander Walters (Tom Butler))
- Twin Peaks (Leland Palmer (Ray Wise))
- U-571 (Maj. Matthew Coonan (David Keith))

==== Animation ====
- Samurai Jack (Scotsman)
