= Dennō Bōkenki Webdiver =

Television series

- Cover for the 20th Anniversary Blu-ray Box Set

電脳冒険記ウェブダイバー (Dennō Bōkenki Webudaibā)
- Genre: Mecha; Cyberpunk
- Created by: Radix; Takara
- Anime television series
- Directed by: Hiroshi Negishi (Chief); Kunitoshi Okajima
- Written by: Mayori Sekijima
- Music by: Yuzo Hayashi
- Studio: Radix
- Original network: TXN (TV Tokyo)
- Original run: April 6, 2001 – March 29, 2002
- Episodes: 52

Dennō Bōkenki Webdiver (電脳冒険記ウェブダイバー, Dennō Bōkenki Webudaibā; lit. Cyber Adventure Record Webdiver) is a Japanese mecha anime series produced by Nihon Ad Systems in conjunction with toy maker Takara and animated by Radix (later Radix Ace). The series is directed by Hiroshi Negishi and Kunitoshi Okajima and written by Mayori Sekijima. It aired on TV Tokyo from April 6, 2001, to March 29, 2002.

== Plot ==
In the year 2100, children have become Web divers and uploaded their consciousness onto global computer networks. They play in a cyber park called the Magical Gate. One day, a mysterious computer virus appears and begins to destroy the Magical Gate. Programs called Web Knights were created to protect the children from the virus but it turned all the Web Knights against the children. The only Web Knight to escape is Gladion. Gladion seeks the help of Kento Yuki, a Web Diver who is in the fourth grade.

== Characters ==
=== Web Divers ===
Kento Yūki (結城ケント, Yūki Kento)
Voiced by: Yumiko Kobayashi
The main protagonist. The fourth grade kid that is lucky enough to escape through the remaining gate before the virus control it. Later then, he also meets one of the web knights called Gladion who has survived the brainwashing and starts to pilot him. In real life he does not have special talent or being smart and cause some trouble in school but inside the web he is a skilled pilot and also care to all his friends, including Web Knights and develops a deep relationship with them.
Aoi Arisugawa (有栖川アオイ, Arisugawa Aoi)
Voiced by: Shiho Kikuchi
The heroine, a close friend of Kento and grand daughter from Prof. Arisugawa who develops Magical Gate. She is also the only girl in the group. Although she does not pilot any web knight, she acts as operator and CIC in Magical Station (the base for Web Knights) with Karon and Kaito (after he joined and when he's not in pilot). She also able to escape Magical Gate with Kento and starts to assist Kento after she's aware of Kento's mission.
Naoki Asaba (浅羽ナオキ, Asaba Naoki)
Voiced by: Junko Takeuchi
Kento's childhood friend and class mate. Naoki often shares rivalry with Kento in some sports and also often to argue with Kento. But they are close friends. He was trapped and brainwashed at first but then Kento and Gladion defeats plus save him with Draguon. Unlike other kids that saved and remember nothing, he actually remembers what happened so he joined the group and stay as Draguon's pilot.
Shō Kurachi (倉知ショウ, Kurachi Shō)
Voiced by: Yuki Kaida
Another Kento's senior and Jean's classmate. He was trapped and brainwashed as well plus pilotting the last Web Knights set that Kento and Gladion need to fights and save them. After saved he joined the group and pilots Daitarion which is a surprise to his friends as Daitarion is main Web Knights. Shō has wise and smart personality which makes him reliable by other members and Daitarion as well (which previously he does not trust anyone)
Jean-Jacques Jacquard (ジャン・ジャック・ジャカール, Jan Jakku Jakāru)
Voiced by: Masataka Nakai
Kento's senior in school and he is from France that stayed in Japan. Jean is also one of survivor that can escape Magical Gate but he is not aware to Kento's mission at first. After Garyun has recruited, he volunteer to help Kento and serve as Garyun's pilot much as his pleasure due to his hobby as Galleon ship figurine collector and his Web Knights is a Galleon ship.
Kaito Yūki (結城カイト, Yūki Kaito)
Voiced by: Reiko Takagi
Kento's little brother that trapped inside Web but he's not brainwashed, instead he just trapped inside Daitarion. His father tried to save him but failed. This forcing Kento to save them both. At first Kento does not let him join but as the group transported to alternate dimension inside the Web world and forced to fight Deletloss Kento does not have other choice. As the youngest boy in the group, He has little to no experience in battle and also only have minor role to help Aoi but he can be helpful in rare situations, such as evacuating the whole group when they're trapped and wounded. Despite he being newbie, Wyverion allow him as pilot and got some experience in the battle field few times plus the fact making strongest mode when Wyverion piloted by Kaito fused with Gladion.

=== Web Knights ===
Gladion (グラディオン, Guradion)
Voiced by: Tomokazu Sugita
Kento's partner Web Knight and also one of the Master Web Knights, Gladion is the only knight-type Web Knight, first appearing as a steam locomotive which transforms into a gladiator. Its true identity is a winged warrior who lives in the planet Couria located in the Andromeda Nebula, 2.4 million light years away from the earth. He is the undisputed strongest warrior in the universe who won the "Space Warrior Martial Arts Tournament" held in the same star system, and faced the invasion of Deletloss alone without regard to danger. In his escape His deeds gave hope to the people of Couria, and his courage inspired warriors on other planets. And he came to be called "Hero" before he knew it. However, the battle with Deletloss ends in a trade-off, and the planet Couria is destroyed. After plugging into a computer and fighting, he lost his physical body and became data. After meeting the Autonomous Management Program Ange, he was reborn as a Web Knight who protects the Magical Gate in order to fight for justice and protect the children's smiles by Web-diving with Kento to evolve and combine with other Web Knights. When combined with Wyverion, which was supposed to be combined from the beginning, it becomes Victory Gladion, Web Divers Kento and Kaito grow white wings, and the coloring of the diver suit changes.
In the final battle, he received great damage in the first battle with Dark Gladion and was wrecked, and he lost his memory and was in danger of disappearing, but he was given the power of the mind by Kento who web dived and headed for his spiritual world. He regained his memory and was revived. In the final battle, together with Kento, he becomes a cyber datanoid resembling an angel with a long lower body without legs, and a real datanoid that mimics his past self equipped with a sword. After a deadly battle with Deletloss on the planet Couria, he got caught up in ensuing explosion, but survived safely.

Ange (エンジェ, Enje)
Voiced by: Ai Uchikawa
An Articial Intelligence used by the Magical Gate. Its personality is based after Aoi's late mother: Mika Arisugawa and its appearance differs depending on who sees it, and the current appearance of Ange, who looks like a fairy with wings, is what Kento and the others imagined. She is in charge of all of the Magical Gates, where the consciousness data of children all over the world are gathered, and as long as the Ange is activated normally, the Magical Gates do not require human management. In the final episode, everyone's "prayer" for Kento and Gladion was delivered by Ange using Aoi as a catalyst.
Charon (カロン, Karon)
Voiced by: Yuki Kaida
A minicomputer that manages the Magical Gate, created by Kento's father to provide support to him and Gladion against Deletloss. It has a variety of functions, such as a scanning function that distinguishes the real from fake. However, the system is unable to see through disguises. It ends its speeches with "~pyoko" and its personality is female.
Griffion (グリフィオン, Gurifion)
Voiced by: Yuuichi Nakamura
A jet which transforms into a griffin. Griffion can also become an armor/weapon module which mounts on Gladion's chest.
Phoenixon (フェニクオン, Fenikuon)
Voiced by: Kenichi Suzumura
A shinkansen train which transforms into a Phoenix. Phoenixon can also become an armor/weapon module which mounts on Gladion's chest.
Sharkon (シャークオン, Shākuon)
Voiced by: Hiroyuki Yoshino
A hovercraft which transforms into a shark. Sharkon can also become an armor/weapon module which mounts on Gladion's chest.
Jaguaron (ジャガオン, Jagaon)
Voiced by: Tokuyoshi Kawashima
A sportscar which transforms into a jaguar. Jaguaron can also become an armor/weapon module which mounts on Gladion's chest.
Garyūn (ガリューン)
Voiced by: Katsuyuki Konishi
A pirate galleon which transforms into a chinese dragon. Garyūn can also become an artillery emplacement for Gladion to operate.
Kerberion (ケルベリオン, Keruberion)
Voiced by: Michio Miyashita
A saw-equipped vehicle which transforms into a cerberus.
Orthrion (オルトリオン, Orutorion)
Voiced by: Akio Suyama
A drill-equipped vehicle which transforms into an orthrus.
Golemon (ゴレムオン, Goremuon)
Voiced by: Michio Miyashita & Akio Suyama
The combined form of Kerberion and Orthrion: a mayan/aztec-style warrior golem.
Dragwon (ドラグオン, Doraguon)
Voiced by: Shinji Kawada
A Semi-trailer truck which transforms into a European dragon. Dragwon can transport Gladion and can also become an artillery emplacement for Gladion to operate
Wyverion (ワイバリオン, Waibarion)
Voiced by: Katsuyuki Konishi
A World War II propeller-driven fighter plane with seaplane pontoons which transforms into a wyvern. Wyverion can become a winged flight backpack for Gladion.
Pegasion (ペガシオン, Pegashion)
Voiced by: Kenichi Suzumura
A moon rover which transforms into a unicorn-headed centaur. Pegasion can become a weapon gauntlet or a different head for Daitarion, forming "Ditalion Pegas."
Ligeron (ライガオン, Raigaon)
Voiced by: Yuuichi Nakamura
A tiltrotor aircraft that transforms into a liger. Ligeron can become a weapon gauntlet or a different head for Ditalion, forming "Ditalion Liga."
Ditalion (ダイタリオン, Daitarion)
Voiced by: Nobuo Tobita
A massive, fantastical airship which transforms into a titanic robot. When transformed into airship mode, Ditalion's head separates, becoming a smaller robot called "Titan." With Ligeron and Pegasion both combined as gauntlets, Ditalion becomes "Ditalion Prime."

=== Deletloss ===
Deletloss (デリトロス, Deritorosu)
Voiced by: Fumihiko Tachiki
The leader of Deletloss, a mysterious program of that suddenly appeared in the real world and corrupted the Magical Gate, resulting to about 300,000 children to be lost in the web and brainwashing all of the Web Knights except for Gladion and Wyverion. The Deletloss Program has been confirmed several times in the World Link Management Bureau, but its capacity far exceeds the limit of the amount of data that can exist in the Magical Gate. Its existence baffled the Administration as its only a small part of it that attacked.
Its true identity was a computer program accidentally created by a scientist on the planet Couria one million years ago. With a ruthless and despicable personality that believes absolutely in the power of evil, he is truly an incarnation of evil. After destroying the planet, he planned to eliminate his old enemy and only survivor, Gladion, and even evolved into a datanoid that could materialize in the real world, invading the Earth's cyberspace and destroy the entire universe. He can also utilize his Web Knight form under the name Dark Gladion. By uniting with Ryuto in the final battle and taking in the soul that resents himself drifting in the cyber world of Couria, he then gained another form resembling a long legless lower body and a monocular demonic cyber body datanoid with wings. It has evolved into a real datanoid in the form of Ryuto, who wears armor with a design and is equipped with a sword. When he's a cyber body datanoid, his weapons are energy waves emitted from his right hand and light bullets emitted from both hands. With its overwhelming fighting power, Gladion suffers, but is defeated by Gladion, who also became a datanoid after fusing with Kento. Deletloss was mortally wounded by Gladion's Break Zahn and was destroyed in an explosion along with the planet.

Ryuto (リュウト, Ryūto)
Voiced by: Hiroyuki Yoshino
A male child replica of Kento created by Deletloss based on the data of Kento. His fighting ability surpasses Kento, and even if he web-dives against Deletloss monsters with inferior performance, he fights more than Kento. He uses him as a sample to obtain human emotions, and eventually tries to have the same ability as Kento. However, he lacks composure, such as being irritated by being shown the strong bond between Kento and his companions, and not being able to understand it. He emits evil energy to manipulate objects and creatures in Virtual Diverland, and by snapping his fingers, he can transfer himself and others to another space, and he also has the healing ability with the light emitted from his left hand. Its true identity is Deletloss itself, and in the final battle, it becomes a real datanoid by being virtually integrated with Deletloss, and confronts Gladion, who also became a datanoid. Using a sword as a weapon, he fought using Dark Gladion's technique, Darkness Zahn, but was defeated by Gladion.
Rada (ラーダ, Rāda)
Voiced by: Yuichi Nakamura
Ryuuto's loyal follower. He denies friendship and has a ruthless personality, such as trying to tear the bond between Kento and his companions, and is the only Deletloss monster with a will of his own. On the other hand, he has a calm side that holds down Ryuto who runs ahead. His duties include monitoring Kento and the others and adjusting the Deletloss monsters. He himself hides in the shadows of his opponents and hypnotizes them, emits electromagnetic waves that block the movement of Master Web Knight, and finally transforms his body into a snake to capture his opponents, and puts anyone he touches into a coma. have various abilities. His fighting ability is inferior to other Deletloss monsters, but he can use various tactics due to his high intelligence. He was destroyed in episode 43.

== Development and production ==
Dennō Bōkenki Webdiver is produced by Radix and Nihon Ad Systems, in conjunction with toy maker Takara and SSD Company, Limited for the toys. For the anime's 20th anniversary, series director Hiroshi Negishi, general director Shin Matsuo, animator Hideyuki Kachi and MODEROID development manager at Good Smile Company Yoshihiro Takagi shared their thoughts on the development of the series.

The concept for Webdiver originated from one of Takara's recently released toy: the Plug and Play Karaoke toy eKara. As Negishi stated, he was inspired by the toy to create a different premise for the series, saying "Setting is nothing... First of all, Takara (now Takara Tomy) sent me a proposal on how to play with toys via Aeon (later We've, now FuRyu). I said that time "I want to release a product that uses a 'plug-it' function that works by connecting it to a TV." However, as with Borgman, I had the impression that it would be quite difficult to link TV and toys. In "Borgman", in order to link it with the toys, we played a high-pitched sound just before the broadcast code as a sound effect during the main story. That's why it's so unreasonable to use the plug-in function to link with a video game! That was the beginning (laughs). But the idea was really interesting. I was surprised to see that the controller was a deformed robot toy itself." Negishi also said about the concept that "Yes. We didn't even have a toy design for the main robot yet, so we just had the general image of a "robot as a game controller". So I felt like I was given an explanation, including Mr. Kachi of Aeon." Hideyuki Kachi also learned about the idea for the series and explained that "At the time, Takara was selling e-kara, a karaoke microphone that you can connect directly to a TV and play with, and there was a trend to release various toys that applied that system. There is also a robot toy project among them, can you make an animation using this? It was kind of a rough story. I had been working on an anime project that used the Internet as a theme, so I guess the starting point was to combine that with that." When deciding for the designs on Gladion and the other Web Knights, Kachi answered that "First, of course, Takara-san came up with the original design, and from there, we played catch with the anime side to finalize it. The number of Web Knights that appeared wasn't exactly 13 from the beginning, but it was more or less like "that's about it".

As explaining the title, Negishi replied that "In the case of NG Knight Lamune & 40 and Mashin Hero Wataru, the main character is the boy in the title. In other words, "web diver" is the meaning of the main character, Kento Yuki. The story itself is about Gladion and Kento Yuki, and since it is also a story of meeting Gladion from the protagonist's perspective and fighting to lend him his power, the main character is a "web diver" in the sense of a young boy. I made it a title. Also, Takara wants to make a difference from other works. Also, back then, everyone liked the sound of the word "gladiator" (laughs). "Gladion" was a little over the top. I don't mind if it's a product name. I think there was also that side." Negishi also came up with the subtitle "Dennō Bōkenki" explaining that "This is because "Bōkenki" was a concept similar to "Jugo Shonen Houryuuki" where children travel in a computer world and fight enemies that stand in their way. I didn't like that it looked like "fighting" was the main thing. For example, if it is "Cyber Senki", isn't it an image of fighting all the time? From the children's point of view, they fight for friendship. Because I wanted it that way." Negishi also explained the VR World setting for the series: "It was 2000 when we started planning and decided on the setting. VR and so on are not common at all in the world. Personally, I simply didn't want to turn it into an RPG anime (laughs)." He also added regarding the concept of Magical Gate as a modern virtual SNS itself and the concept closer to the image of wearing an avatar than "boarding" that "For me, when I saw "Ready Player One", I thought, "This is exactly what I wanted to do with Web Diver!" At that time, there were budget problems and CG technology problems, so it was quite an impossible task (laughs)." and added that "At the time, it was a little difficult to express that. Also, even though you plug in and enter the computer world, your physical body is in the real world, so it had to be in the form of a simulated experience. I had a hard time justifying that. In the second half of the series, I went to the computer world normally instead of a simulated experience (laughs)." Negishi also explained about the worldview of Magical Gate: "That has something to do with the composition of the series. First of all, as a product plan, Takara came up with a plan for how many robots he wanted to release in a year. About 3 of them are the deluxe specs that will be the main force, and Gladion is naturally that. In addition, Dragwon and Ditalion are also products with that specification, but toys have a big sales season in spring, summer, and winter, so in the spring we have the hero robot Gladion, in the summer we have Dragwon, and in the winter we have Ditalion for Christmas. The release schedule was decided in advance. The climax of the story is created accordingly. After all, the strongest enemy that comes at the very end is Ditalion. Before reaching there, a powerful rival, Dragwon, will appear. That's why Magical Gate is divided into three layers, with Ditalion at the farthest back and Dragwon in front of it. Every time you clear one layer at a time, enemies who are originally allies will appear, and Gladion will "wake up!" I thought about the world view in a way that matches the composition." For the character and the Web Knight's designs, Kachi and Matsuo explained in detail regarding some of them having animal designs for their fighter modes. Kachi said "That's because it's linked to play as a toy. It was the anime side that came up with the rationale behind that." Matsuo also said that "I actually went to Takara at the time and talked to the engineers who were making toys there, and they seemed to be very particular about making them. He said, "Transforming a motif that other companies don't do into a robot." Moreover, he said that he was developing it so that it would be a proper locomotive, such as a sailing ship, rather than just changing the atmosphere. That's why the enthusiasm for "Web Diver" was amazing. A few years after the "Brave Series", I felt the spirit of creating a new series of robots for children with that kind of feeling when I talked with the engineers. I also talked about how it would be nice if that happened. Also, when I said, "For me, it's good to have proper eyes, nose, and mouth!", he was very happy (laughs). I like robots with black eyes." For the human characters design and naming, Negishi recalled that "Naming seems to be difficult, but that's not the case. First of all, for Aoi, we have a rule within ourselves that says, "The heroine's name that starts with 'A' will make a hit" (laughs). Production manager Motoki Ueda worked for Apple on Zillion, and I worked on Anise for Borgman. Furthermore, I came up with Aki in Space Knight Tekkaman Blade and said that the heroine with "A" would definitely hit. So she became Aoi (laughs)." He also added regarding Kento and Kaito that "Yuuki Kento is simply a rhyme. Yuuki comes from "courage", so when compared to his younger brothers, it's easy to say and don't overlap, Kento and Kaito. I thought about the names of the other members in balance with those three names. Jean is the only child who lives overseas, so I gave it a slightly different sound."

However, in regards to the CG in the series itself, Negishi said that "This was largely due to the circumstances of the drawing. After all, mecha drawing is difficult, and at that time I had already reached a certain limit. If we had a lot of animators draw in small cut units to reduce the burden, it would be difficult to standardize the details." He also added that "Mr. Yamaguchi, who was in charge of the CG director, started by reassembling the joints of the hands and feet of the CG model for action. In the beginning, there were parts where I couldn't keep up with the work, but as the number of episodes increased, the range of movement gradually expanded. Also, since the CG part of the main story was done in-house at Radix, I would tell them how it would look like, and the CG staff would point out things like, "It's like this in storyboards, but it's difficult in CG." That's what we were doing directly to each other. He did the best he could."

== Media ==
=== Anime ===
Dennō Bōkenki Webdiver first premiered on TV Tokyo and other affiliate stations in Japan beginning April 6, 2001, until March 29, 2002, with a combined run of 52 episodes. R.A.M, a group formed by Hideaki Takatori alongside Akihiko Hirama and Sister MAYO performed both the show's opening themes: "DIVER#2100" and "SO DIVE!" while KATSUMI performed the first ending theme "TOGETHER" and Hironobu Kageyama sang the second ending theme "Fighters". Yuzo Hayashi composed the music for the show.

Nippon Columbia released the series on both DVD and VHS during the show's run. Frontier Works released a 20th Anniversary Blu-ray Box Set on December 22, 2021, containing two discs with all 52 episodes, a limited edition Drama CD "The Return of the Web Knight", a special Soundtrack CD, illustrations and concept art for the show. The box set also includes the exclusive weapon parts "Holy Sword Granslayer" to be used for MODEROID Gladion.

=== Video games ===
The series has now appeared in Bandai Namco Entertainment's long running Super Robot Wars series of games, starting with Super Robot Wars DD in 2023 as a limited event unit.

=== Merchandise ===
Takara released several toys based on the mechas on the anime series during its run. Each toy has a special functionality to connect to the TV to replicate the "Plug-it" feature seen in the anime to play games. For the toy release of Gladion, the toy can link up with other Web Knight toys for it to power up, which affects the gameplay when connected.

For the anime's 20th anniversary, Good Smile Company announced that several of the mechs from the series will be added in the MODEROID line of plastic models, with Gladion and Dark Gladion released in December 2021 and Wyverion in March 2023.
