= Radix Ace Entertainment =

Japanese animation studio

- Native name: 株式会社ラディクスエースエンタテインメント
- Romanized name: Kabushiki-gaisha Radikusu Ēsu Entateinmento
- Company type: Kabushiki gaisha
- Industry: Japanese animation
- Predecessor: Radix (founded on December 6, 1995; 30 years ago); Zero-G Room (founded on September 11, 1991; 34 years ago)
- Founded: September 3, 2001; 24 years ago
- Defunct: October 1, 2006; 19 years ago
- Successor: Radix Mobanimation; Seven; Zero-G Inc.
- Headquarters: Chiyoda, Tokyo, Japan
- Subsidiaries: Radix Digital Shitsu (1999–2004, initially a subsidiary of Radix)

Radix Ace Entertainment Co., Ltd (Japanese: 株式会社ラディクスエースエンタテインメント, Hepburn: Kabushiki-gaisha Radikusu Ēsu Entateinmento) was a Japanese animation studio closed on October 1, 2006. The studio was formed on September 3, 2001 from a merger between Radix (株式会社 RADIX(ラディクス), Kabushiki-gaisha Radikusu) (founded on December 6, 1995) and Zero-G Room (株式会社ゼロ・G・ルーム, Kabushiki-gaisha Zero Jī Rāmu) (founded on September 11, 1991). Much of the staff from Radix Ace joined Seven or merged with Mobanimation to become Radix Mobanimation in 2007.

== Works ==
=== TV series ===
Title	Episodes	Networks	Original run	Notes
Zero-G Room (1991–2001)
Master of Mosquiton '99	26	TV Tokyo	October 1997 – April 1998	Remake of Master of Mosquiton by Radix.
Radix (1995–2001)
Nazca	12	TV Tokyo	April 1998 – June 1998	
Silent Möbius	26	TV Tokyo	April 1998 – September 1998	
Baby Felix	26	NHK	October 2000 – June 2001	Co-produced with Aeon.
Android Kikaider: The Animation	13	Kids Station	October 2000 – January 2001	Co-produced with Studio OX.
Webdiver	52	TV Tokyo	April 2001 – March 2002	Co-produced with Nihon Ad Systems.
Radix Ace Entertainment (2001–2006)
Okojo's Happy Apartment	51	TV Tokyo	October 2001 – September 2002	
Haibane Renmei	13	Fuji TV	October 2002 – December 2002	
Wonder Bebil-kun	26	NHK	April 2003 – February 2004	
Divergence Eve	13	AT-X, Tokyo MX	July 2003 – September 2003	
Misaki Chronicles	13	TV Kanagawa	January 2004 – March 2004	Sequel to Divergence Eve.
Operation Sanctuary	13	AT-X	June 2004 – September 2004	
Wind: A Breath of Heart	13	AT-X	June 2004 – September 2004	
Comic Party: Revolution	13	TKV, KBS, AT-X	April 2005 – June 2005	Co-produced with Chaos Project. Spin-off of Comic Party by OLM.
Akahori's Heretical Hours: Love Games	13	AT-X, BS Asahi, KBS Kyoto, Tokyo MX, TV Kanagawa	July 2005 – September 2005	
Lemon Angel Project	13	AT-X, KBS Kyoto, Tokyo MX	January 2006 – March 2006	
Love Get Chu	25	TV Tokyo, TVA, TVO, AT-X	April 2006 – September 2006	
Baké-Gyamon	51	TV Tokyo	April 2006 – March 2007	

=== OVAs/ONAs ===
Title	Episodes	Year(s)	Notes
Zero-G Room (1991–2001)
K.O. Beast	7	1992–1993	Co-produced with Animate Film.
Bounty Dog	2	1994	Co-produced with Animate Film.
Saber Marionette R	3	1995	Co-produced with Animate Film.
Shadow Skill	4	1995–1996	
Yamato Takeru: After War	2	1995	Sequel to Yamato Takeru by Nippon Animation.
M.D. Geist: Death Force	1	1996	Sequel to M.D. Geist by Production Wave.
Hyper Speed Grandoll	3	1997	
Radix (1995–2001)
Master of Mosquiton	6	1996–1997	
Sakura Wars: The Gorgeous Blooming Cherry Blossoms	4	1997–1998	Co-produced with Animate Film.
Amazing Nurse Nanako	6	1999–2000	
Sakura Wars: Return of the Spirit Warriors	6	1999–2000	Co-produced with Animate Film. Sequel to Sakura Wars: The Gorgeous Blooming Cherry Blossoms.
Radix Ace Entertainment (2001–2006)
Kikaider 01: The Animation	4	2001–2002	Co-produced with Studio OX. Sequel to Android Kikaider: The Animation.
Sakura Wars: Sumire	1	2002	Spinoff of Sakura Wars: The Movie by Production I.G.
Sakura Wars: Ecole de Paris	3	2003	Spinoff of Sakura Wars: The Movie by Production I.G.
Vie Durant	8	2003	Co-produced with Marine Entertainment.
Kikaider vs. Inazuman	1	2003	Co-produced with Studio OX. Spin-off of Android Kikaider: The Animation.
Sakura Wars: Le Nouveau Paris	3	2004	Sequel to Sakura Wars: Ecole de Paris.
Operation Sanctuary+	4	2004	Spin-off of Operation Sanctuary.
Honey x Honey Drops	1	2006	
