= Reiko Takagi =

Japanese voice actress (born 1973)

- 高木 礼子
- Born: November 26, 1973 (age 52); Osaka Prefecture, Japan
- Occupations: Voice actress; narrator
- Years active: 1995–present
- Agent: Sigma Seven
- Height: 145 cm (4 ft 9 in)

Reiko Takagi (高木 礼子, Takagi Reiko; born November 26, 1973) is a Japanese voice actress and narrator from Osaka Prefecture, Japan. Some of her major roles are Kaolla Su in Love Hina, Yamato Daiwa in Battle B-Daman, Sakura Kusakabe in Bludgeoning Angel Dokuro-chan, Hiyori Sarugaki in Bleach, Luxandra Frail in Divergence Eve, Tadase Hotori in Shugo Chara!, Maki in Minami-ke, and Nobunaga Asakura in Nogizaka Haruka no Himitsu. In video games, she voices Cassandra Alexandra in the Soulcalibur series.

== Filmography ==
=== Anime ===
List of voice performances in anime
Year	Title	Role	Notes	Source
1995	El-Hazard	Waitress, female	Also Alternative World	
1996	Brave Command Dagwon	Child	Ep. 41	
1996	Gall Force: The Revolution	Crew, Computer voice, West Force Commander-in-chief	OVA	
1997	Slayers Try	Paru	Ep. 19	
1997	Shinkai Densetsu Meremanoid	Child		
1997	Hareluya II Boy	Kiyohiro, others		
1997	Fortune Quest L	Baby	Ep. 24	
1998	Lost Universe	Kain Blueriver (young)		
1998	Shadow Skill – Eigi	Lunaris Anbra, Boy		
1998	His and Her Circumstances	Boy	Ep. 16	
1998	Sorcerous Stabber Orphen: Begins	Male student	Ep. 8	
1998	Yoshimoto Muchikko Monogatari	Muchikko B	Ep. 26	
2000–02	Love Hina series	Kaolla Su		
2000	Inuyasha	Mizuki	Ep. 130	
2001	Super Gals!	Harue Kudoh		
2001	Dennō Bōkenki Webdiver	Shinnou Tomoyuki, Yuuki Kaito		
2001	PaRappa the Rapper	Pinto Rappa		
2001	Crush Gear Turbo	Jiro Takoyama, Shiro Takoyama		
2001	Hikaru no Go	Yoshitaka Waya, Le Ping		
2002	Witch Hunter Robin	Mamoru Kudo		
2002	Fortune Dogs	Sanpe		
2002	Mobile Suit Gundam	Millie	Special Edition DVD	
2003	Machine Robo Rescue	Katsura		
2003	Transformers Armada	Girl, Amphitrite		
2003	Crush Gear Nitro	Makoto Mahane, Maruda, Annie, Yoshiko Takayama		
2003	E's Otherwise	Tsubaki, Kai Kudo (young)		
2003	Ultra Maniac	Rio		
2003	Divergence Eve	Luxandra Frail		
2003	D.C. ~Da Capo~	Jun'ichi Asakura (young)		
2003	Yami to Bōshi to Hon no Tabibito	Ken-chan		
2003	R.O.D the TV	Toru Okahara		
2004	Misaki Chronicles	Luxandra Frail, Isuzu Miura		
2004	Battle B-Daman	Yamato Daiwa		
2004	The Marshmallow Times	Cloud, Lily		
2004	Midori Days	Takako Ayase		
2004	Phoenix	Leona (young)		
2004	Elfen Lied	Tomoo		
2004	Bleach	Hiyori Sarugaki, Rurichiyo Kasumiōji, Shōta Toyokawa		
2005	Battle B-Daman: Fire Spirits	Yamato Daiwa		
2005	Bludgeoning Angel Dokuro-Chan	Sakura Kusakabe, Minami-san		
2005	Emma – A Victorian Romance	Erich Molders		
2005	Mirmo!	Panta		
2005	Patalliro Saiyuki	Genjou Sanzou (Maraich)		
2005	D.C.S.S.: Da Capo Second Season	Jun'ichi Asakura (young)		
2006	Wan Wan Celeb Soreyuke! Tetsunoshin	Tetsunoshin / Celebrity Knight, Chocolat / Twelve		
2006	Ballad of a Shinigami	Saiki		
2006	Black Blood Brothers	Sei		
2006	La Corda d'Oro: Primo Passo	Kahoko Hino		
2006	Kujibiki Unbalance	Lisa Hamby		
2006	Penelope tete en lair	Miro		
2007	Gegege no Kitaro 5th series	Koichi, Takuya	TV 5th series	
2007	Hayate the Combat Butler	Butler Vida	Ep. 30	
2007	Tōka Gettan	Ken-chan	Ep. 14	
2007	Emma – A Victorian Romance: Second Act	Thomas		
2007	Mushi-Uta	Tōko Gorōmaru		
2007	Bludgeoning Angel Dokuro-Chan 2	Sakura Kusakabe, Minami-san		
2007–10	Shugo Chara! series	Tadase Hotori		
2007	Pururun-tsu shizuku-chan ぷるるんっ！しずくちゃん あはっ☆	Puririn		
2007–13	Minami-ke series	Maki		
2007	Genshiken Pt.2	Kumiko Yabusaki		
2008–12	Nogizaka Haruka no Himitsu series	Nobunaga Asakura		
2008	Battle Spirits: Shounen Toppa Bashin	Female Announcer, Masaru, Takeru, Princess, others		
2008	Tytania	Boy servant		
2008	Asataro, the Onion Monk ja:ねぎぼうずのあさたろう	Konomi		
2009	La Corda d'Oro: Secondo Passo	Kahoko Hino		
2009	Asura Cryin' series	Haruna Chiyohara		
2009	Phantom: Requiem for the Phantom	Duke Stone		
2009	Slap-up Party: Arad Senki	Boy Meiji		
2009	Penelope tete en lair second series	Miro		
2009	Sora no Manimani	Masashi Edogawa, Kahoru Oyagi		
2009	Kaidan Restaurant	Michio Sakai		
2010	Lilpri	Sei		
2010–11	MonHun Nikki Girigiri Airū-mura Airū Kiki Ippatsu series	Pakase	Also G	
2011	Blue Exorcist	Young Katsuro		
2011	Battle Spirits: Heroes	Kota Tatsumi		
2012	Shirokuma Café	Swimwear woman		
2013	Yondemasuyo, Azazel-san Z	Azazel's mother		
2014–15	JoJo's Bizarre Adventure: Stardust Crusaders	Holly Kujo		
2014	La Corda d'Oro: Blue Sky	Kanade Kohinata		
2015–15	One Piece	Russian, Jewelry Bonney (Episode 888+)		
2016	Ace Attorney (TV series)	Lotta Hart		

=== Theatrical animation ===
List of voice performances in feature films
Year	Title	Role	Notes	Source
1999	Gundress: The Movie	Silvia Kakihana		
2005	Ashita genki nina ~re! ~ Hanbun no satsumaimo ~ あした元気にな～れ！ ～半分のさつまいも～	Noboru		
2019	One Piece: Stampede	Jewelry Bonney		

=== Video games ===
List of voice performances in video games
Year	Title	Role	Notes	Source
1996	Fire Woman Matoi Gumi ja:ファイアーウーマン纏組	Yuu Hiiragi	PC FX	
1997	Mahjong Gakuensai ja:麻雀学園祭	Sawako Hayami	Sega Saturn	
1998	Fire Woman Matoi Gumi	Yuu Hiiragi	PS1/PS2	
2000	Love Hina series	Kaolla Su		
2001	Eve: The Fatal Attraction	Mika Andō, Miki Andō	PS1/PS2	
2001	Kurogane no Houkou: Warship Commander 鋼鉄の咆哮	Nagi	PS2	
2002	Hikaru no Go: Heian Genso Ibun Roku	Yoshitaka Waya	PS1/PS2	
2002	Hikaru no Go: Insei Chojo Kessen	Yoshitaka Waya	PS1/PS2	
2003	Soulcalibur II	Cassandra Alexandra	Arcade/GC/PS2/Xbox	
2005	Soulcalibur III	Cassandra Alexandra	PS2	
2007	Kujibiki Unbalance	Lisa Hamby	PS1/PS2	
2008	Bleach: The 3rd Phantom		NDS	
2008	Soulcalibur IV	Cassandra Alexandra	PS3/360	
2008	Nogizaka Haruka no Himitsu: Cosplay Hajimemashita	Nobunaga Asakura	PS1/PS2	
2008	Shugo Chara! Amunonijiiro Chara Change	Tadase Hotori	DS	
2009	Dengeki Gakuen RPG: Cross of Venus	Sakura Kusakabe	DS	
2009	Shugo Chara! Norinori! Chara na Rhythm	Tadase Hotori	DS	
2010	Nogizaka Haruka no Himitsu: Doujinshi Hajime Mashita	Nobunaga Asakura	PSP	
2012	Muv-Luv	Yoroi Mikoto	Windows	
2018	Soulcalibur VI	Cassandra Alexandra	PS4/Windows/Xbox One	
	Brave Saga	Aiba Nanako	PS	

=== Drama CDs ===
List of voice performances in drama CDs
Title	Role	Notes	Source
Da Capo	Junichi (young)	Drama CD	
Love Hina series	Kaolla Su	Drama, talk and song CDs	
Minami-ke series	Maki	Drama, talk and song CDs	
Nogizaka Haruka no Himitsu series	Nobunaga Asakura	Drama CD	
Shugo Chara! series		Drama, talk and song CDs	
Gohan wo tabeyou vol. 4	broadcast in shop	Drama	
Hatsunejima Drama Theater chapter 1 Sakura		Talk CD	
Mirumo de Pon! Charming drama CD vol 1		Talk CD	
Mirumo de Pon! Charming drama CD vol 2		Talk CD	
Revery Earth	girl	Drama CD	
Sailor Victory Ongaku & Drama Shuu		Talk and song CDs	
Shounika byoutou he irasshai		Drama CD	
Slayers Extra CD volume 2	Girl in street, fighter	Drama CD	
Workday Warriors -Koi ni ochite-		Drama CD	

=== Tokusatsu ===
List of voice performances in tokusatsu
Title	Role	Notes	Source
Tomica Hero: Rescue Fire	Q-suke		

=== Dubbing ===
List of dub performances in overseas productions
Title	Role	Notes	Source
Bamboo Bears	Karasu	overseas	
Casper	Casper	Malachi Pearson	
Pinocchio			
The Pretender		season 2	
