= Wan Wan Celeb Soreyuke! Tetsunoshin =

Japanese anime television series

- ワンワンセレプー それゆけ!徹之進
- Genre: Adventure; Comedy
- Created by: Hiroto Ishikawa (We've)
- Written by: Takashi Yamada
- Directed by: Kiyoshi Fukumoto
- Voices of: Reiko Takagi; Chō; Shintarō Ōhata
- Music by: Kazumi Kitashiro
- Country of origin: Japan
- Original language: Japanese
- No. of episodes: 51

Production
- Producer: Takeshi Baba (Studio Comet)
- Animator: Studio Comet
- Production companies: TV Aichi; Tokyu Agency; We've

Original release
- Network: TXN (TVA, TV Tokyo)
- Release: 7 January – 30 December 2006

Wan Wan Celeb Soreyuke! Tetsunoshin (ワンワンセレプー それゆけ!徹之進, Wanwan Serepū Soreyuke Testsunoshin; lit. Bow-wow Celebrity Poodle Let's Go! Tetsunoshin) is a 2006 Japanese anime television series created by Hiroto Ishikawa and directed by Kiyoshi Fukumoto. The series is animated by Studio Comet, with the series written by Takashi Yamada, who later worked on HeartCatch PreCure! and character designs both done by Shuichi Seki and Shida Tadashi. The series first premiered on TV Aichi and TV Tokyo from 7 January to 30 December 2006 with a total of 51 episodes. The first episode preview was shown after the final episode of Transformers: Cybertron.

== Plot summary ==
The Inuyama Family, along with their pet dog Tetsunoshin moves to the famous Hoppongi Hills (modeled after Roppongi Hills) from Kyushu. Rumi Inuyama's father owns an IT Company in Japan and is a step further to becoming number one. However, Tetsunoshin learned that his master's family loaned a lot of money renting their home in Hoppongi Hills, almost to the point of the whole company becoming bankrupt. To make things even worse, the whole family spends a lot of money on everything, making Tetsunoshin's problems worse. To solve this problem, Tetsunoshin teamed up with the Hills Dogs and will do anything to pay all the Inuyama Family's expenses.

== Characters ==
=== Hills Dogs/Dog Paradise Members ===
Tetsunoshin (徹之進, Tetsunoshin) / Celebrity Knight (セレブナイト, Serebunaito)
Voiced by: Reiko Takagi
Tetsunoshin is a seven-month-old Toy Poodle living with the Inuyama Family. His owner is Rumi Inuyama. He and his owner were once from Kyushu before moving to the Hoppongi Hills in Tokyo. He speaks with a Kyushu accent and loves his owner and very much, and will do anything to get them out of bankruptcy. Tetsunoshin has a very long 5 meter pedigree certificate scroll, containing his family lineage (though its contents were washed off in Episode 25) and he is the 81st of the 102 born poodles. He also has a crush on Chocolat and likes her a lot. With Seto's powers, he can assume his human form as Celebrity Knight. As Celebrity Knight, he supports his master in many ways and tries to make her happy, though this transformation lasts for only three minutes.
Seto (セト, Seto)
Voiced by: Chō
Seto is a Miniature Schnauzer and the oldest member of the Hills Dogs. Usually trained well in magic, he stands as Tetsunoshin's mentor in any situation they face. As the leader of the Hills Dogs, he has responsibility on protecting their secret hideout, the Dog's Paradise from outsiders and will punish them if they revealed their secrets. Also he has an ability to turn dogs into humans, only for a short period of time.
Pochi (ポチ, Pochi)
Voiced by: Shintarō Ōhata
Pochi is a Bull Terrier and also one of Tetsunoshin's close friends. His owner is Sagiyama Aya, a famous star in Tokyo. He first met Tetsunoshin after he saved him from John. After then he starts to adore Tetsunoshin and helps him with his owner's family problems. He is very shy and sometimes can't handle spicy foods, but he also has courage to take some risks. He was once transformed into a human by Seto.
Hakase (ハカセ, Hakase)
Voiced by: Hiroki Shimowada
Hakase is a 5-year-old Welsh Corgi and the genius of the Hills Dogs. He has an IQ level of 200.5 and is a genius on inventing things. Hakase usually serves as a trader to earns funds for the whole Dog Paradise and sometimes spends some of his time in Akihabara looking for electronics. He also produces a lot of strange inventions and gadgets that benefit the members of the Hills Dogs.
Hanzou (ハンゾウ, Hanzō)
Voiced by: Junji Majima
Hanzou is a 7-year-old Mameshiba and also a trained Iga-ryū ninja, usually self trained. He speeches ends with "~de gozaru" and is very calm and yet also very supportive to the members of the Dog Paradise. He first met Seto years ago as a stray in an early age and he was taken in as a member of the group. Hanzo is also one of the Hills Dogs who is transformed into a human.
Meg (メグ, Megu)
Voiced by: Chiwa Saitō
Meg is a 2-year-old Papillon and also one of the three female members of the Hills Dogs. Being one of the youngest members, Meg is a sassy girl and likes to be an idol someday, going through auditions. She has a huge rivalry with Audrey, one of the Shirogane Dogs and will try everything to be on top and become a star. Meg also serves as Seto's massager, usually in her dog form, she uses her feet to massage Seto's back. Like the others, she has a human form as well.
Victoria (ビクトリア, Bikutoria)
Voiced by: Haruhi Terada
Victoria is a 5-year-old Poodle and also one of the three female members of the Hills Dogs. She is very stylish and yet mature, and also serves as Seto's Secretary. She has a lot of experience on TV commercials and also a good VIP while in human form. Victoria also wears glasses and has allergies to Elephants since she was a puppy. She is also afraid of ghosts.
Rinia (リニア, Rinia)
Voiced by: Tatsuhisa Suzuki
Rinia is a 6-year-old English Setter and also a speedster of the Hills Dogs. He operates the vehicles Hakase makes for his friends and also an expert pilot.
Iwan (イワン, Iwan)
Voiced by: Yūichi Ishigami
Iwan is a 10-year-old Siberian Husky and the group's strongman. He was born as a mercenary dog and was trained since he was a puppy. Thought sometimes dimwitted and goes into action rather than words, he doesn't like to be called an idiot by his friends. He also has a human form thanks to Seto's Dog Magic.
Ooana (オオアナ, Ōana)
Voiced by: Nobuyuki Kobushi
Ooana is a 10-year-old Pekingese and also the group's gambler. Although he is an expert gambler, he sometimes has his share of bad-luck and sometimes his sense of direction is bad.
Chocolat (ショコラ, Chocora) / Twelve (トゥエルブ, Touerubu)
Voiced by: Shion Hirota (Chocolat), Reiko Takagi (Twelve)
Chocolat is a Chihuahua and also one of the three female members of the Hills Dogs. Her owner is Yuki Yagino. She recently joined the group after Tetsunoshin told her about the Dog Paradise. She is the object of Tetsunoshin's affection, having fallen in love with her at first sight and sometimes calling her an angel. Thought she can get mad when he said something bad to her. At first glance, Chocolat seems innocuous, but in reality, she is a spy from the Shirogane Dogs named Twelve, to spy on the Hills Dogs, especially to Seto. She once worked in a Circus before joining the Shiroganes, later being adopted by Yuki's family. She was killed in episode 50.
John (ジョン, Jon)
Voiced by: Atsushi Imaruoka
John is a Dachshund He's a crazy and yet country dog calling from Shirogan. He once worked for the formerly henchman of Shirogan, but defected after Tetsunoshin saved his life.

=== Shirogane Dogs ===
Neo (ネオ, Neo)
Voiced by: Kinryu Arimoto
The leader of the Shirogane Dogs. He is cruel and tyrannical and would like nothing less than to see the Hills Dogs put down. He used to a pupil at the same training grounds as Seto. Like Seto he can also make use of magic.
Sasuke (サスケ, Sasuke)
Voiced by: Kunihiro Kawamoto
The Shirogane ninja. He took the same training as Hanzou.
Kaiser (カイザー, Kaisā)
Voiced by: Tetsuharu Ōta
Andrey (オードリー, Audrey)
Voiced by: Sayuri Yahagi
Golgo (ゴルゴ, Golgo)
Voiced by: Takashi Nagasako
Turbo (ターボ, Turbo)
Voiced by: Atsushi Imaruoka

=== Other Dogs ===
Chiyo (千代)
Melissa (メリッサ, Merissa)
Voiced by: Natsuki Mori
Robbie (ロビイ, Robi)
Voiced by: Akiko Yajima

=== Humans ===
Rumi Inuyama (犬山 ルミ, Inuyama Rumi)
Voiced by: Kei Shindou
Tetsunoshin's owner. She is very charismatic, making friends with new people and doing her part for her family. She attends the Saint Lady Academy.
Masao Inuyama (犬山 マサオ, Inuyama Masao)
Voiced by: Yoshihisa Kawahara
Rumi's father. He is the head of his IT company, but often finds himself stressed from large amounts of debts and his relatives squandering his hard-earned money. Still he is very supportive of his family and Tetsunoshin.
Yōko Inuyama (犬山 陽子, Inuyama Yōko)
Voiced by: Misa Kobayashi
Rumi's mother. She is very carefree and not very cautious of the family's budget, that she often goes into shopping sprees. Sometimes she offers encouragement and confidence to her husband.
Toranosuke Inuyama (犬山 虎之助, Inuyama Toranosuke)
Voiced by: Takkou Ishimori
Kaoruko Inuyama (犬山 薫子, Inuyama Kaoruko)
Voiced by: Haruhi Terada
Takuzou Kimura (木村 卓造, Kimura Takuzō)
Voiced by: Tomohisa Asou
Hana Hanasaki (花咲 ハナ, Hanasaki Hana)
Voiced by: Fuyuka Oura
The Inuyama's serving maid. She is very klutzy, often breaking something or hurting herself. She sometimes serves as Rumi's mentor.
Aya Sagiyama (鷺山 彩, Sagiyama Aya)
Voiced by: Kanae Abe
Yuki Yagino (八木野 ユキ, Yagino Yuki)
Voiced by: Asuka Tanii
Taizou Kurogane (黒金 太蔵, Kurogane Taizō)
Voiced by: Daisuke Matsuoka
Shima Kurogane (黒金 志摩, Kurogane Shima)
Voiced by: Natsuki Mori
Reika Kurogane (黒金 麗華, Kurogane Reika)
Voiced by: Miwa Kouzuki
Rumi's rival, who turns her face at the Inuyama family's methods and possessions with some ridicule and portraying a standoffish attitude. She also competes for Celebrity Knight's affection.
Doushin Onitsuka (鬼塚 道真, Onitsuka Doushin)
Voiced by: Kunihiro Kawamoto
Gary Kamata (ゲイリー鎌田, Geirī Kamata)
Voiced by: Tetsuharu Ohta
A skilled dog trimmer, who becomes infatuated with Tetsunoshin (much to the dog's chagrin) and has a passion for cross-dressing.
Burimaro (ブリマロ)
Voiced by: Nobuyuki Kobushi
Rasheed (ラシッド, Rashiddo)
Voiced by: Tetsuharu Ohta
An Indian prince who travels on an elephant, even indoors. He does not share the monarchic traditions of his father and tries enjoy his new life in the Hills.
Sacheet (サジット, Sajitto)
Voiced by: Fuyuka Oura

== Theme songs ==
Opening theme

- and yet
  - Lyrics: Yuya Abe
  - Composition: Yuya Abe
  - Arrangement: Yoshiyuki Sahashi & Suther Rand
  - Artist: Suther Rand (Epic Records)
- Across the Other Side of the Sky (空の向こうの向こう, Sora no mukō no mukō)
  - Lyrics: Naru Kawamoto
  - Composition: UZA
  - Arrangement: Hiroaki Ono
  - Artist: Naru Kawamoto (T.Y.Entertainment)

Ending theme

- Life Gauge
  - Lyrics: Hiroko and Mitsuyuki Miyake
  - Composition: Mitsuyuki Miyake
  - Artist: Mihimaru GT (Universal Music Japan)
- WISH
  - Lyrics: Nana Inoue
  - Composition: UZA
  - Arrangement: Hiroaki Ono
  - Artist: Nana Inoue (T.Y. Entertainment)

== Episodes ==
No.	Title	Directed by	Written by	Storyboard by	Original release date
1	"Tetsunoshin Lives In The Hills" "Tetsunoshin HILLS ni sumu" (てつのしんヒルズに住む)	Kiyoshi Fukumoto	Takashi Yamada	Kiyoshi Fukumoto	7 January 2006
The Inuyama family move to the Hills. Mr. Masao Inuyama is aghast to learn that his parents have spent a fortune on an expensive apartment. In the park Tetsunoshin rescues Seto from two pedigrees, then learns about the existence of the Dog Paradise community.
2	"Tetsunoshin Transforms" "Tetsunoshin henshin suru" (てつのしん変身する)	Saotome Yūsaku	Takashi Yamada	Kiyoshi Fukumoto	14 January 2006
Hoping to save his family from bankruptcy, Tetsunoshin implores the help of Seto, who helps him utilise a transformation spell into his alter ego Celebrity Knight, persuading Masao to buy and sell successful stocks.
3	"Tetsunoshin Enters A Contest" "Tetsunoshin CONTEST ni deru" (てつのしんコンテストに出る)	Michita Shiraishi	Yuki Enatsu	Shigetaka Ikeda	21 January 2006
Tetsunoshin decides to enter the dog trimming contest to win a lifetime supply of dog food and save dogs from the humiliating trims done by the stubborn trimmer Gary-san
4	"Tetsunoshin Goes Seadiving" "Tetsunoshin umi ni moguru" (てつのしん海にもぐる)	Yasuhiro Minami	Yoshimi Narita	Kazumi Fukushima	28 January 2006
Gen-san's traditional sushi restaurant is in danger of closure. On Seto's behalf, the Hills Dogs go out in their submarine to gather sushi ingredients including on gigantic tuna fish.
5	"Tetsunoshin Becomes An Actor" "Tetsunoshin haiyuu ni naru" (てつのしん俳優になる)	Omori Kazunaga	Mitsutaka Hirota	Ten Komori	4 February 2006
Tetsunoshin auditions for a movie to earn a large sum of yen for the Inuyamas. The showbiz turns out to be dangerous and eventually the film fails to release.
6	"Tetsunoshin Makes Chocolate" "Tetsunoshin choko o tsukuru" (てつのしんチョコをつくる)	Norihiko Nagahama	Yuki Enatsu	Shigetaka Ikeda	11 February 2006
Tetsunoshin goes to a lot of trouble to make chocolate by hand for Valentine's while the dog hating principal of Saint Lady Academy desperately tries to bring a gift to her valentine.
7	"Tetsunoshin Does Home Deliveries" "Tetsunoshin takuhai suru" (てつのしん宅配する)	Akira Shigino	Mitsutaka Hirota	Akira Shigino	25 February 2006
Tetsunoshin takes up a delivery service job to raise money to fund Rumi's first class trip to Hawaii. Shirogane however decides to take over the deliver service, until the service goes out of control.
8	"Tetsunoshin Becomes A Ninja" "Tetsunoshin ninja ni naru" (てつのしん忍者になる)	Kiyoshi Fukumoto	Yoshimi Narita	Saotome Yūsaku	4 March 2006
Tetsunoshin fascinated by Hanzou-san's ninja skills accompanies him with Pochi, while they go on the trail of Seto's lost pacifier.
9	"Tetsunoshin Saves Pochi" "Tetsunoshin pochi o tasukeru" (てつのしんポチを助ける)	Michita Shiraishi	Takashi Yamada	Kiyoshi Fukumoto	11 March 2006
Pochi is afraid is his owner is going to divorce and take him to Hollywood away from his friends. The Hills dogs work together to get Asa Sagiyama and Yoshihiko-san to reconcile.
10	"Tetsunoshin Goes To Akihabara" "Tetsunoshin AKIBA ni iku" (てつのしんアキバに行く)	Omori Kazunaga	Mitsutaka Hirota	Kazumi Fukushima	18 March 2006
Feeling unwanted due to her clumsiness, Hana leaves. Rumi and Tetsunoshin find her at Akiba. Rumi and her friend Otaki-san convince Hana to return home.
11	"Tetsunoshin Entertains" "Tetsunoshin settai suru" (てつのしん接待する)	Koichi Sasaki	Yoshimi Hirota	Noriyuki Nakamura	25 March 2006
The Inuyamas and Kuroganes compete to see who gets a business contract from Yoru Gates. Mr. Kurogane seems to be gaining Gates' favour, but Gates' secretary appreciates the Inuyamas' hospitality.
12	"Tetsunoshin Goes Cherry Blossom Viewing" "Tetsunoshin o-hanami suru" (てつのしんお花見する)	Akira Shigino	Mitsutaka Hirota	Akira Shigino	1 April 2006
The Kuroganes have capitalised the cherry blossom grounds. The Hills Dogs fail to make an old secluded cherry tree bloom, but the Inuyamas' appreciation of the tree, brings petals to the branches.
13	"Tetsunoshin Becomes A Fierce Coach" "Tetsunoshin oni COACH ni naru" (てつのしん鬼コーチになる)	Kiyoshi Fukumoto	Yoshimi Hirota	Saotome Yūsaku	8 April 2006
Rumi and Yuki practice tennis to compete against Reika. Tetsunoshin as Celebrity Knight provides them intense training, but finds himself in a bind when Chocolat attends.
14	"Tetsunoshin Makes Up Love" "Tetsunoshin koi decchiageru" (てつのしん恋をでっちあげる)	Norihiko Nagahama	Yuki Enatsu	Shigetaka Ikeda	15 April 2006
Rasheed's father wishes him to marry against his will. As he struggles to find a wife, he accidentally meets Victoria in human form. Things get awry when John gets in the way.
15	"Tetsunoshin Goes Shirogane" "Tetsunoshin shirogane ni iku" (てつのしん白金に行く)	Omori Kazunaga	Takashi Hamada	Shigetaka Ikeda	22 April 2006
Tetsunoshin goes with his family and Pochi to Shirogane, a place dreaded by the Hills Dogs. The Shirogane dogs almost get the Hill Dogs arrested as they check out the area.
16	"Tetsunoshin Scuffles" "Tetsunoshin kakutou suru" (てつのしん格闘する)	Michita Shiraishi	Yuki Enatsu	Shigetaka Ikeda	29 April 2006
Hoping to win prize money, Tetsunoshin trains hard to face champion kickboxer Shiruko. Celebrity Knight collaborates with Shiruko when rivals exploit his weakness.
17	"Tetsunoshin Becomes A Detective" "Tetsunoshin tantei ni naru" (てつのしん探偵になる)	Omori Kazunaga	Takashi Hamada	Kazumi Fukushima	6 May 2006
Tetsunoshin fancies himself as a detective. With Seto, Ooana and Victoria, they start a detective office. One case involves finding out what Masao has been up to.
18	"Tetsunoshin Visits His Mother" "Tetsunoshin haha o tazuneru" (てつのしん母を訪ねる)	Koichi Sasaki	Mitsutaka Hirota	Ken'ichi Kuhara	13 May 2006
On Mother's Day, Rumi wants to get her mother a present, while Tetsunoshin wants to meet his own mother in Tokyo for the first time. Tetsunoshin learns that he is her mother's 81st puppy.
19	"Tetsunoshin Puts You on a Diet" "Tetsunoshin DIET saseru" (てつのしんダイエットさせる)	Koichi Sasaki	Yoshimi Hirota	Noriyuki Nakamura	20 May 2006
Tetsunoshin decides to open a diet class for undisciplined overweight dogs. Meg's old friend Chin shows up to lend a paw and sets the dogs' owners standards right.
20	"Tetsunoshin Produces" "Tetsunoshin PRODUCE suru" (てつのしんプロデュースする)	Akira Shigino	Yuki Enatsu	Akira Shigino	27 May 2006
Tetsunoshin volunteers to be a producer for Meg hoping to make her an idol for the World Cup to replace the pompous Audrey. Chocolat gets the position of idol after the stage is ruined.
21	"Tetsunoshin Makes a Goal" "Tetsunoshin GOAL o kimeru" (てつのしんゴールを決める)	Koichi Sasaki	Takashi Hamada	Kazumi Fukushima	3 June 2006
The Hill Dogs qualify for an exhibition soccer game for Japanese dogs versus German dogs. The game is made difficult by John having to score the goals and the Germans' foul play.
22	"Tetsunoshin Looks For Treasure" "Tetsunoshin otakara o sagasu" (てつのしんお宝をさがす)	Omori Kazunaga	Mitsutaka Hirota	Shigetaka Ikeda	10 June 2006
Chocolat is made a new member of the Dog Paradise community. The Hill Dogs decide to search for the treasure of Takeda Shingen at Lake Mijin. They find themselves up against tomb raiders.
23	"Tetsunoshin Helps Papa Out" "Tetsunoshin PAPA o ouen suru" (てつのしんパパを応援する)	Kiyoshi Fukumoto	Kenichi Yamashita	Kiyoshi Fukumoto	17 June 2006
Today is Rumi and Tetsunoshin's birthday and Mr. Inuyama is short on cash. Tetsunoshin gets help from the Hills Dogs financier Mika.
24	"Tetsunoshin Becomes Leader" "Tetsunoshin LEADER ni naru" (てつのしんリーダーになる)	Koichi Sasaki	Yoshimi Hirota	Noriyuki Nakamura	24 June 2006
Seto has become ill and asks Tetsunoshin to run Dog Paradise temporarily, but most of the Hills Dogs are reluctant to accept it.
25	"Tetsunoshin Fights With Pochi" "Tetsunoshin POCHI to kenka suru" (てつのしんポチとケンカをする)	Michita Shiraishi	Yuki Enatsu	Shigetaka Ikeda	1 July 2006
Tetsunoshin is upset with Pochi over ruining his pedigree scroll. To make matter worse, he has been banished from the Dog Paradise for lack of humility. Tetsunoshin reunites with Pochi after learning about his bad upbringing.
26	"Tetsunoshin Catches A Dog Thieves" "Tetsunoshin inu doroubo o tsukamaeru" (てつのしん犬泥棒を捕まえる)	Akira Shigino	Mitsutaka Hirota	Akira Shigino	8 July 2006
Pedrigree dogs are getting stolen. Tetsunoshin infiltrates where the stolen dogs are kept, learning that the dog Ruffian masterminded the dognappings to spite humans.
27	"Tetsunoshin Goes to Shirogane Part 2" "Tetsunoshin shirogane ni iku 2" (てつのしん白金に行く2)	Liena Zhang	Takashi Hamada	Kazumi Fukushima	15 July 2006
The Shirogane dogs are plotting against the Hill Dogs. The Hill Dogs get captured trying to infiltrate the town. After Seto and Tetsunoshin rescue their friends, they find themselves face with the Shirogane leader Neo.
28	"Tetsunoshin Meets A Ghost" "Tetsunoshin obake to deau" (てつのしんオバケと出会う)	Mitsutoshi Satō	Yoshimi Hirota	Shigetaka Ikeda	22 July 2006
Seto holds a test in the dog cemetery to bring Tetsunoshin and Chocolat closer together. A ghost pug called Dopper is courting Chocolat, trying to make up for lost love. Victoria is able to exorcise Dopper.
29	"Tetsunoshin has a Credit Card" "Tetsunoshin CARD o motsu" (てつのしんカードを持つ)	Koichi Sasaki	Takashi Hamada	Koichi Sasaki	29 July 2006
Hanzou goes undercover as John to investigate the Shirogane dogs, managing to get information and his cover blown. Meanwhile, Tetsunoshin gets his own credit card and squanders his earnings.
30	"Tetsunoshin Goes to his Hometown" "Tetsunoshin ogaeri suru" (てつのしん里帰りする)	Liena Zhang	Kenichi Yamashita	Kazumi Fukushima	5 August 2006
Tetsunoshin, Pochi and the Inuyama family go to Kyushu. Tetsunoshin learns that his name was derived from Rumi's classmates Tooru and Susumu. The two boys compete to rename the toy poodle until Celebrity Knight intervenes.
31	"Tetsunoshi Destroys A Marriage" "Tetsunoshin kekkon o kowasu" (てつのしん結婚をこわす)	Akira Shigino	Yuki Enatsu	Akira Shigino	12 August 2006
32	"Tetsunoshin Befriends A Robot Dog" "Tetsunoshin ROBOT inu to tomodachi ni naru" (てつのしんロボット犬と友達になる)	Shigetaka Ikeda	Mitsutaka Hirota	Shigetaka Ikeda	19 August 2006
33	"Tetsunoshin Helps With Homework" "Tetsunoshin shukudai o tetsudau" (てつのしん宿題を手つだう)	Mitsutoshi Satō	Masaaki Sakurai	Kazumi Fukushima	26 August 2006
34	"Tetsunoshin Enters The World Wide Web" "Tetsunoshin NET sekai e iku" (てつのしんネット世界へ行く)	Koichi Sasaki	Mitsutaka Hirota	Koichi Sasaki	2 September 2006
35	"Tetsunoshin Is Enthusiastic About The Sport Meet" "Tetsunoshin undokai de harikiru" (てつのしん運動会ではりきる)	Liena Zhang	Kenichi Yamashita	Shigetaka Ikeda	9 September 2006
36	"Tetsunoshin Betrays The Dog Paradise?" "Tetsunoshin inu rakuen o uragiru?" (てつのしん犬楽園をうらぎる？)	Akira Shigino	Takashi Hamada	Akira Shigino	16 September 2006
37	"Tetsunoshin Is Tortured By Neo" "Tetsunoshin Neo ni gomon sareru" (てつのしんネオにゴーモンされる)	Mitsutoshi Satō	Yoshimi Hirota	Kazumi Fukushima	23 September 2006
38	"Tetsunoshin Is Driven Out Of Hills" "Tetsunoshin Hills o oidasareru" (てつのしんヒルズを追い出される)	Shigetaka Ikeda	Yuki Enatsu	Kiyoshi Fukumoto	30 September 2006
39	"Tetsunoshin Saves His Friends" "Tetsunoshin nakama ni tasukerareru" (てつのしん仲間に助けられる)	Koichi Sasaki	Mitsutaka Hirota	Koichi Sasaki	7 October 2006
40	"Tetsunoshin Finds Out The Meaning Of 'Like Cats And Dogs'" "Tetsunoshin kenennonaka no imi o shiru" (てつのしん犬猿の仲のイミを知る)	Kiyoshi Fukumoto	Masaaki Sakurai	Takayoshi Suzuki	14 October 2006
41	"Tetsunoshin's Identity Is Discovered By Rumi" "Tetsunoshin Rumi ni shoutai ga bareru" (てつのしんルミに正体がばれる)	Akira Shigino	Kenichi Yamashita	Akira Shigino	21 October 2006
42	"Tetsunoshin And Rumi Go To Dog Paradise" "Tetsunoshin Rumi to inu rakuen o iku" (てつのしんルミと犬楽園を行く)	Shigetaka Ikeda	Takashi Hamada	Shigetaka Ikeda	28 October 2006
43	"Tetsunoshin Protects The Suspected Pochi" "Tetsunoshin utawareta Pochi o kabau" (てつのしん疑われたポチをかばう)	Mitsutoshi Satō	Yuki Enatsu	Kazumi Fukushima	4 November 2006
44	"Tetsunoshin Discovers The Book Of Secrets" "Tetsunoshin hidensho o mitsukeru" (てつのしん秘伝書をみつける)	Koichi Sasaki	Yoshimi Hirota	Koichi Sasaki	11 November 2006
45	"Tetsunoshin Trains For The Sake Of Fighting" "Tetsunoshin tatakai no tame ni tokkun suru" (てつのしん戦いのために特訓する)	Mitsutoshi Satō	Mitsutaka Hirota	Takayoshi Suzuki	18 November 2006
46	"Tetsunoshin's Separation From His Beloved Rumi" "Tetsunoshin daisuki na Rumi to wakareru" (てつのしん大好きなルミと別れる)	Akira Shigino	Takashi Hamada	Akira Shigino	25 November 2006
47	"Tetsunoshin Discovers Chocolat's Secret" "Tetsunoshin Chocolat no himitsu o shiru" (てつのしんショコラの秘密を知る)	Shigetaka Ikeda	Yoshimi Hirota	Shigetaka Ikeda	2 December 2006
48	"Tetsunoshin Cries Because Of An Eternal Love" "Tetsunoshin eien no ai ni naku" (てつのしん永遠の愛に泣く)	Mitsutoshi Satō	Mitsutaka Hirota	Kazumi Fukushima	9 December 2006
49	"Tetsunoshin Loses An Important Friend In Space" "Tetsunoshin uchuu de taisetsu na tomo o ushinau" (てつのしん宇宙で大切な友を失う)	Koichi Sasaki	Yuki Enatsu	Kiyoshi Fukumoto	16 December 2006
50	"Tetsunoshin's Big Magic Succeeds" "Tetsunoshin daimahou o uketsugu" (てつのしん犬魔法を受けつぐ)	Shigetaka Ikeda	Kenichi Yamashita	Takayoshi Suzuki	23 December 2006
51	"Tetsunoshin Leaves The Hills" "Tetsunoshin Hills o deteiku" (てつのしんヒルズを出て行く)	Kiyoshi Fukumoto	Takashi Hamada	Kiyoshi Fukumoto	30 December 2006
