= Misaki Chronicles =

Japanese anime television series

- Divergence Eve: Misaki Chronicles

みさき クロニクル ～ダイバージェンス・イヴ～ (Misaki Chronicles ~Divergence Eve~)
- Genre: Adventure, horror, mecha
- Anime television series
- Directed by: Jun Takada (Chief); Hiroshi Negishi
- Produced by: Motoki Ueda; Tsuneo Takechi; Toshio Hatanaka; Maki Horiuchi; Katsuya Morita; Shigehiro Sakata
- Written by: Tohru Nozaki
- Music by: Yōsuke Haga
- Studio: Radix Ace Entertainment
- Licensed by: NA: ADV Films (expired) Sentai Filmworks (2013-07-18–)
- Original network: TV Kanagawa
- Original run: 7 January 2004 – 26 March 2004
- Episodes: 13

Divergence Eve: Misaki Chronicles (みさき クロニクル ～ダイバージェンス・イヴ～, Misaki Kuronikuru ~Daibājensu Ivu~) is an anime sequel to Divergence Eve. It follows smoothly from the previous series. The characters are the same and the plot is similar, but the theme of the episodes is much different. In this series, the elite team at Watcher's Nest is traveling through time, fighting the Ghoul at different points in time during Earth's history, mostly in Japan. There's also some discussion about the fact that the different times to which they are traveling may also be different versions of Earth, on which the time-line is slightly altered. This series is also distinct from its predecessor in that it is more plot- and character-driven, with less in the way of fan service.

== Episodes ==
1. 2315 – Allied Forces Military Academy (8 May 2302, 20 May 2315)
  - The first episode begins with a flashback to Misaki's childhood, depicting her relationship with her father. Back in 2315, Misaki is just starting her military training in boot camp. In the present time, Lyar is prepared to begin her hunt for the GHOUL on Earth, armed with newly developed technology and a newly upgraded Kotoko.
2. 2316 – Field Training
  - Misaki and her new team begin field training. When a friend from her future visits, the mission becomes much more real. At the end of the episode, Lyar comments on Misaki's performance during the field training exercise to Kiri, whose group she was shown being a part of. Kiri explains she and Misaki never worked together. The first time the two even met was after her assignment to Watcher's Nest.
3. 1594 – The Assassination of Toyotomi Hideyoshi
  - Lyar travels back into feudal Japan during the sixteenth century to find a ghoul. She meets a man who helps her complete her mission. A failed assassination attempt leaves Kurenai-no-ha mortally wounded.
4. 1594 – Grotesque Shadow
  - Still in feudal Japan, Lyar encounters another spectral that appears to be Misaki in her ghoul form. Misaki attempts to make contact with Lyar, but she dismisses it as an illusion of the GHOUL and eradicates the creature, causing the Misaki of that time period to drop dead, as the apparition of her younger self looks on in sadness. Lyar is forced to leave prematurely, as the rift is near closing. Lyar must ultimately choose to leave her newest ally as opposed to helping him. When asked for his real name, he finally reveals his name is Ishikawa Goemon. Young Misaki follows Lyar and Kotoko back through the time portal. Kotoko reveals there was a record of a Goemon, who attempted to assassinate a man who ruled Japan during the era, but was unsuccessful and executed as a result.
5. 1936 – The 2-2-6 Incident
  - A bloody coup attempt is taking place in pre-World War II Japan. The team is alerted to a ghoul presence in the middle of that coup and Kiri and Kotoko are dispatched to attack it. When they arrive, Kiri finds that Misaki is already there and learns about what has been causing all of the strange ghoul events.
6. 2305 – Allied Military Naval Base
  - Misaki travels to a time in which her father is still alive and is preparing to go to Watcher's Nest.
7. The Two Watcher's Nests
  - Watcher's Nest comes into contact with a version of itself on another time-line. The team, including Suzanna, travels to it to gather information.
8. Soldiers Return
9. The Ruin's Secret
10. Hidden Past
11. Overlapping Timelines
12. Mission 4
  - Ghouls have begun invading from all Inflation Holes in the universe. Suzanna is dispatched to sever the link between LeBlanc's link with the control room. Lyar destroys the Necromcaners. Misaki, Lyar and Kiri enter the ruins, only to enter a battle with a GHOUL used by LeBlanc to hold them off. They manage to dodge the GHOUL's attacks, and trap the creature in a micro-quantum barrier. As Misaki flies over the creature to stop LeBlanc, the GHOUL manages to fire a final shot before being completely trapped by the barrier. With no way of avoiding the shot, Kiri intercepts the blast head-on, dying as a result. Misaki confronts LeBlanc, but is unable to fire due to his control over the environment. As he shoots at Misaki using his rampant armor, Prim delivers her own body to the Integral System using Kotoko-02's body, and manages to hold LeBlanc at bay long enough for Misaki to finish him off. As LeBlanc resists, it causes damage to the Integral System, harming Prim's physical body. LeBlanc informs Misaki she will destroy Prim's mind if she fires on her now. Prim explains she is the only one who can stop her brother's madness, and explains their familiar relation as being due to being two subjects created from the same set of genes. After learning the truth behind their connection, Misaki tearfully fires the final shot, killing LeBlanc and Prim in the process. Unfortunately, it was too late. The information she provided to LeBlanc while under his control was complete, allowing him to transfer his mind to a host body that would go on to merge with the GHOUL. LeBlanc's goal has been to achieve an existence of utter nothingness. LeBlanc was created as a test subject at the hands of Alchemy, an organization form that wanted to make science the religion of the new age. Both are in the GHOUL-form, and just as LeBlanc appears to be gaining the upper hand, Misaki manages to tip the balance in her favor. Misaki connects the last Inflation Hole connecting their current location and Earth, and sends Lyar, Kotoko, Suzanna, and all of the people aboard the ring back to Titan, the site of the Inflation Hole.
13. Misaki (14 June 2318 – 2327)
  - One year after the events of the previous episode, Lyar receives permission to visit the families of those who died at Watcher's Nest. She first pays a visit to Luxandra's mother. Woern's receives confirmation those displaced from Watcher's Nest cannot return to Earth. She next visits Kiri's brother. A visit to see Kotoko prior to these visits revealed no information about an individual named Misaki. Her last trip takes her to Alchemy to explain Prim's death, which had been blamed on an accident with the accelerator. Suzanna submits an application to become join on at the engineering department for the emigration project, which involves the use of interstellar spacecraft. Prim informs Jalabert on the collapse of the Inflation Hole near Titan. Her reports also indicate that Juzoh Kureha had no children, and he in turn confirms that Lyar von Ertiana is the last survivor of the Kessler Project.

2327 – Lt. Commander Ertiana is keeping a journal, and explains that it's been sixty-years since they've set out into the Solar System. Due to her being the captain, it's necessary for her to stay awake, along with the crew, to make sure nothing goes wrong on the journey. She will spend approximately twenty-years of their mission awake while alternating shifts with two vice captains. A mission is patched in to the ship, which is from Misaki telling the potential receiver to inform Lt. Commander Ertiana that she is ok. The vessel comes in contact with Watcher's Nest, which indicates that there's still signs of a collapse. Lyar decides to explore the region and comes across Misaki's old room. She finds her journal there, which describes her experiences after first arriving at Watcher's Nest. After Lyar regains hope of making contact with Misaki, she can be seen running through Watcher's Nest as power is restored and the people are let out of their ships. There are a number of minor appearances from characters who had appeared in the previous series, and even this one, in periphery roles, including Luke Walker, the ice cream vendor from the Divergence Eve episodes Specular and Designer's Children, and the girl who witnessed the specular of the Ghoul in Specular. A woman can be made out prominently from the back, dressed in clothes similar to Luxandra in the opening theme song, looking at the schedule of flights. She is joined by a woman whose outfit greatly resembles Kiri's from the theme song and Misaki's memories. These two doppelgängers exchange glances, but only their faces above the nose are visible. The Luxandra-like woman's scars are noticeably absent from her face. Suzanna can also be seen working in a similar maintenance position as she was after her memories were altered in Divergence Eve. Professor Jalabert and Prim are also seen arriving, but not without the introduction of a woman whose face below the nose are not shown. Her appearance, including the color of the uniform, her eyes and the braid wrapped around her forehead, all resemble Lyar from her cadet days in the tenth episode, Hidden Past. Guided by an apparition of Young Misaki, Lyar discovers Misaki materializing in her room, along with her journal. Misaki explains she's been waiting there for her the whole time. Lyar embraces Misaki in a warm hug, which closes out the series.

== Characters ==
=== Main characters ===
Misaki Kureha (紅葉 みさき, Kureha Misaki) Voiced by: Yumi Kakazu (Japanese); Kira Vincent-Davis (English)
Misaki's the main character after which the series is named. For most of the series, she does not appear in human form. She reveals herself to other characters as a translucent apparition of herself in a yellow dress. She seems to mature during the series and as she does, her ghostly form grows up. In the beginning, she usually looks like herself as a child, but later in the series she becomes an adolescent, then an adult. In episode 5, it's revealed that she has been the cause of the time fluctuations at Watcher's Nest and it's because of her that there have been so many ghoul invasions. She tells Kiri that she's trying to alter the past to prevent herself from losing her friends, which happened in the previous series, Divergence Eve.
Young Misaki Voiced by: Yumi Kakazu (Japanese); Kira Vincent-Davis (English)
This was the name of an apparition who appeared in the last episode of Divergence Eve. There, she asked Misaki if she was truly sure she wanted to proceed. She makes an appearance in the first episode, as the object of Lyar's pursuit. She is a translucent apparition who appears at different time periods, especially when different versions of Misakis integrated into time appearances are present. She is a separate entity from Misaki herself. She demonstrates complete autonomy from Misaki, as she was seen discussing Misaki's decisions and emotions with her. It was revealed in the fourth episode to Lyar, Grotesque Shadow, where the apparition stated she was made from Misaki, but represents a different version of Misaki.
Luxandra Frail (ルクサンドラ・フレイル, Rukusandora Fureiru) Voiced by: Reiko Takagi (Japanese); Christine Auten (English)
Having been murdered by a ghoul in Divergence Eve, Luxandra doesn't play much of a part in the series except that she's one of the people that Misaki is trying to save. Misaki hopes to travel back in time and prevent both her death and Suzanna's decision to leave the force and have her memory erased. She briefly appears in the first episode as part of a group considered elite by other students, along with Suzanna and Kiri. Luxandra appears in the second episode, this time, shown as being a part of a group consisting of herself, Misaki, Kiri and Suzanna. She is shown demonstrating her intelligence and aptitude, which she had been identified as having in the first series, when she manages to take an entire time out without a single missed shot. She also makes an appearance in the third episode, The Assassination of Totomi Hideyoshi but only in the form of a flashback. As Misaki of the sixteenth century stares at a painting, an apparition of her younger form tells her she wants to escape into the memories of the dead. Misaki then recalls Luxandra discussing about how she wanted to prove that she was just as capable a soldier as Lt. Commander Ertiana during their training mission. But she laments towards the end about how it didn't work out that way, followed by several scenes of her death at the hands of a GHOUL in the tenth episode of Divergence Eve bearing the same name.
Suzanna Bluestein (スサーナ・ブルースタイン, Susāna Burūsutain) Voiced by: Sanae Kobayashi (Japanese); Emily Carter-Essex (English)
Suzanna's memories have been restored so that she can return to active duty. Suzanna makes a fleeting appearance in the first episode, shown to be amongst a group of students deemed elite at the Allied Forces Military Academy by their peers, consisting of herself, Misaki, Luxandra and Kiri. Suzanna, along with the other three, would be teamed together in the following episode for a field training exercise. Suzanna's next appearance is in the fifth episode, where she encounters Kiri for the first time since her resignation from the service. She expressed a desire to once become an officer, but backed out after thinking she wouldn't be capable. When encouraged to dig deeper, Suzanna's heartbeat began to race.
Kiri Marialate (キリ・マリアレーテ, Kiri Mariarēte) Voiced by: Fumie Mizusawa (Japanese); Jessica Boone (English)
Kiri has to take over the investigation after Lyar is overcome by too many passages through the time barrier. Of the four who started at the previous series, Kiri appeared most frequently over the course of the series. Her first appearance at the beginning of the series is brief: she, along with Luxandra and Suzanna, are seen dining together at a table, and are observed by Misaki and her classmates as being of an elite status. She appears in the following episode, teamed up with Luxandra, Suzanna and Misaki. Unlike her other teammates, she was much less tolerant of Misaki's clumsiness. After Misaki accidentally shot her gun at her own teammates, a shot in which Kiri intercepted with a single hand, she moved ahead of the group for the next group. However, she was shown to be openly worried about Misaki later on.
Lyar Von Ertiana (ライアー・フォン・エルティアナ, Raiā Fon Erutiana) Voiced by: Reiko Kiuchi (Japanese); Shelley Calene-Black (English)
Lyar is charged with investigating apparent GHOUL sightings that correspond to significant instances in Japan's past. She and Kiri attempt to convince Misaki to stop trying to change the past.
Kotoko-02 (コトコ-02?) Voiced by: Miyu Matsuki (Japanese); Sasha Paysinger (English)
Having destroyed in a battle with a Ghoul towards the end of Divergence Eve, but her mind and memories still intact, Kotoko's body is rebuilt and upgraded. She considers her new appearance "much cuter", which Lyar agrees. Physically her body is slightly more mature and her voice also no longer has the slight metallic tone to it. Throughout the series Kotoko plays a more prominent role than in Divergence Eve, maintaining both her memories and relationship with Lyar.

In episode 10, Hidden Past, a model even older than Kotoko-01 appeared. She was presumably Kotoko-00 and may have been the first model of android used on Watcher's Nest. Her appearance appeared to have traits of both the -01 and -02 model. She had a shade of pink hair closer to the -01 model, which was secured by clips that held them in Bunch-like pigtails while her outfit was sleeveless, more in line with the -02 model. She was under the command of a superior office during a time when Lyar was a new cadet. She had no dialogue in her short appearance, and unlike either of the upgraded versions, appeared colder and emotionless in comparison to the more inquisitive nature of -01 and exuberant nature of -02. In episode 11, Hidden Past, while Kotoko is backing her memories up in the event of her destruction, LeBlanc is able to disable Kotoko after she discovers his plan to link the computer systems in Watcher's Nest to the mainframe in the ruins. Despite this, Prim is able to take control of Kotoko's body in order to help her stop Le Blanc. In episode 13, Misaki, Lyar returns to greet Kotoko-02 after her repairs have been complete by Nodera. When she inquires as to the nature of Misaki, Kotoko reveals there is nothing in her memory banks about an individual with that name. She then inquires if Lyar is ok.

Prim Snowlight (プリム・スノーライト, Purimu Sunōraito) Voiced by: Rina Satou (Japanese); Luci Christian (English)
When the crew reenters Watcher's Nest, they find Prim in a comatose after she freed Misaki from Jean-Luc's control over her in the last episode of Divergence Eve and remains in a coma for the majority of the series.

In episode 11, Prim attempts to take over Kotoko's body after LeBlanc disables Kotoko. She gains control of it by the twelfth episode and manages to deliver her body to the Integral System. Before LeBlanc can fire a fatal shot from his Rampant Armor, Prim manages to restrict the computer systems in his rampant armor, long enough for Misaki to fire the finishing shot. Misaki cannot initially bring herself to take the shot. Prim reveals why she had followed LeBlanc. The two are brother and sister, having been created from the same set of genes. LeBlanc's resistance causes greater damage to Prim's physical body, with LeBlanc eventually gaining the upper hand and telling Misaki that if she fires, she'll be killing Prim. She manages to hold LeBlanc at bay long enough for Misaki to fire, shattering the rampant armor and killing Prim. In episode 13, Misaki when Lyar returns to Earth to inform her "family" of her demise, she encounters Jalabert. She begins to explain that Prim died in an accident involving an accelerator, but he informs her that Prim was never dispatched to Watcher's Nest. Prim would later be assigned to the project that intended to carry the displaced refugees back into the solar system in search of a planet, after Earth rejected their attempts to return to the planet. She and Suzanna would be seen working together, and Prim's background in theoretical physics allowed her to give further insight to parallel universes and how someone trapped in one could get back.

=== Antagonists ===
Jean Luc LeBlanc (ジャン・リュック・ルブラン, Jan Ryukku Ruburan) Voiced by: Takehito Koyasu (Japanese); Jason Douglas (English)
His first appearance within the series was during the second episode 2316 – Field Training, musing about the possibility of there not being any talent amongst the new recruits after hearing Luke Walker's men inquire about their potential. This was all the while using a laptop to research information related to Misaki. His rank at the time appeared to be "Inspector from H.Q.". He appeared at the end as the form of an image of himself on computers in the Watcher's Nest systems.
Toyotomi Hideyoshi Voiced by: Tokuyoshi Kawashima (Japanese); Marty Fleck (English)
He appeared in the third episode, 1594 – The Assassination of Toyotomi Hideyoshi. He is first seen as the target of a ninja, who attempts to take his life. However, he appears to be invulnerable, as weapons strike an energy barrier. The would-be assassin is then killed by a shadow, which was in actuality a GHOUL. Kurenai-no-Ha would later make an attempt on his life, but he was shown to be shielded by the force of a GHOUL.

=== Others ===
Bernard Firestar (バーナード・ファイアスター, Bānādo Faiasutā) Voiced by: Hiroyuki Yoshino (Japanese); Jay Hickman (English)
Bernard makes a single appearance in the second episode in the series. While in pursuit of the source of time fluctuations, Lyar stumbles across the field training group he's a part of. Both sides have their weapons drawn until she reveals her rank, and then discovers Bernard is one of its members. Before she's able to gather any information, her attention is diverted to the mysterious apparition, which she goes off in pursuit of. He is shown not having any idea of her identity when asked by his teammates.
Lieutenant Yun in Japanese Voiced by: Akeno Watanabe (Japanese); Tiffany Grant (English)
Known as LT. JG Yung in the English rendering, she appeared infrequently throughout Divergence Eve, and this series as well. The two would often quip about nothing bad happening to Lt. Commander Ertiana since she still had to get married.
Lieutenant Azebed in Japanese & Lt. Azevedo in English Voiced by: Kenichi Suzumura (Japanese); Rick Burford (English)
Known as Lt. Azevedo in the English rendering, he appeared infrequently throughout Divergence Eve, and this series as well. He was always paired with Lieutenant Yun, and the two would often quip about nothing bad happening to Lt. Commander Ertiana since she still had to get married.
Ishikawa Goemon Voiced by: Kazuki Yao (Japanese); Vic Mignogna (English)
He first appeared in the third episode, 1594 – The Assassination of Toyotomi Hideyoshi. Mistaking Lyar for a man, he almost engaged her in a battle in the dead of night. When asked, he identified himself as Kurenai-no-Ha He accompanied Lyar to the city she was searching for before setting out on his own mission. Lyar would have to apply an artificial skin graft to his body in order to keep him from losing too much blood. He appeared in the subsequent episode, 1594 – Grotesque Shadow, where he came in contact with Misaki's Specular form. Although she had the upper hand, he was saved when Lyar used the technology to terminate her GHOUL form on Earth. Due to the temporal barrier having a limited opening through which it could be passed, Lyar was unable to assist him in his mission. He identifies Lyar by her real name before she departs, which he claimed to have heard from Kotoko-01. Before she left, Lyar asked for his real name, to which he responded Ishikawa Goemon. As Lyar and Kotoko made their escape, Kotoko revealed there was a record of someone by that name. He tried to take the life of the current ruler and was executed as a result. When Lyar reflects on her experience, she realizes that Kurenai-no-Ha sounded very similar to Kureha, Misaki's surname, strongly implying he is an ancestor of hers. This is lent further credence by the fact that the apparition of Young Misaki was concerned with making sure he was tended to after being injured, even after the GHOUL had retreated and his target had been left wide open. Given Misaki's wish to avert the pain and suffering she and others had experienced, it's highly likely this was her intent.
Isuzu Moira Voiced by: Reiko Takagi (Japanese); Kelli Manison (English)
She appeared only in the fifth episode, 1936 – The 2-2-6 Incident.
Comrie Rotblat (コムリー・ロートブラット, Komurī Rōtoburatto) Comrie Rotblat Voiced by: Akeno Watanabe (Japanese); Allison Sumrall (English)
She is the orange-haired technician who appeared infrequently during Divergence Eve. She appears in the same capacity. Her Here, though, she is shown prepping Suzanna for crossing the temporal barrier in the seventh episode The Two Watcher's Nests. She offers words of encouragement to Suzanna after seeing her worry and tells her to believe in Major Ertiana. She was last seen in episode 13, Misaki, handing Nodera's baby to Lyar so she could name it. Along with Nodera and his wife, she expressed an interest in the Lt. Commander naming the baby.
Nodera Voiced by: Kenichi Suzumura (Japanese); Greg Ayres (English)
Nodera appears closer towards the end of the first episode. Here he is shown preparing Lyar by showing her how to use the recently developed GHOUL technology on Earth. He is also the one to report Lyar of the stress crossing the temporal barrier is taking on her body in the fifth episode, 1936 – The 2-2-6 Incident. In the thirteenth episode, Misaki, Nodera's wife gives birth to the first baby since their journey back out into deep space. Nodera's wife requests that she name the baby, to which her husband, Nodera, and Lt. Comely agree. She decides to name the child Misaki, which means cape and promontory.
Juuzou Kureha Voiced by: Hiroaki Hirata (Japanese); John Swasey (English) (2275-2306)
He was the father of Misaki. After making a number of appearances in flashbacks in Divergence Eve, but appears in full during an early scene in the first episode. His name later appears atop a headstone, just as it did in Divergence Eve, but his year of death appears completely unobscured in the first episode of Misaki Chronicles. He is shown being training for deep space travel by diving to deep depths in the ocean. Yet another version of Misaki makes an appearance here, this time as a technician helping him prep. He asks Misaki if they knew each other, as she looks familiar. She coyly replies by that he "probably says that to all of the girls," to which he replies that it was just her. Her father is one of the many people's death she's trying to avert. In his case, she hopes to stop him from going to Watcher's Nest, the location he would later die at.
Akari Kureha Voiced by: Yuri Amano (Japanese); Monica Rial (English) (2279-2303)
She was the mother of Misaki. Her name previously appeared on a headstone in the eleventh and thirteenth episodes of Divergence Eve. She makes her first physical appearance in the series was during an early scene in the first episode, set on 2302-05-08, with a younger Misaki, awaiting her husband's arrival. Akari appears in the tenth episode, Hidden Past as Misaki learns of her father's life. She is the mother of Misaki, and is seen in the flashbacks of Juzoh Kureha's life. She was one of the first responders on the scene of Juzoh's accident and was the attending nurse who helped him regain their mobility. The two would later fall in love and get married. Later on, she would give birth to Misaki. Although the family would live happily together, their time together was short. After Juzoh returned from his first trip, he came to find that his wife in the hospital. Akari expressed thoughts about some of the things she wished she would've been able to do. In episode 13, Misaki Prim revealed that Akari Kureha had died of a terminal illness at a young age.
Luke Walker (ルーク・ウォーカー, Rūku Wōkā) Voiced by: Ryûzaburô Ôtomo (Japanese); John Gremillion (English)
Luke appears in the first episode of the series. He is the drill sergeant at the Allied Forces Military Academy, and is shown to be a tough leader. He forces Misaki to do extra laps for falling behind her comrades and not being able to answer why she had enlisted at the academy. He also appears in the second episode, with a group of others in a tent, monitoring the progress of the field training exercise. He also has a brief cameo in the thirteenth episode, Misaki, where he is shown coming back to Watcher's Nest. He appears in the twelfth episode,
Wolfgang Woerns (ウォルフガング・ヴェルンス, Worufugangu Verunsu) Voiced by: Ikuya Sawaki (Japanese); John Tyson (English)
Luxandra's Mother Voiced by: Eriko Kawasaki (Japanese); Kelli Manison (English)
Luxandra's Mother makes an appearance in the last episode. Lyar makes a visit to the families of the soldiers who lost their lives at Watcher's Nest. It is at her house where Lyar discovers how much Luxandra idolized her, and also discovers she was aboard the vessel saved by Lyar that gave Luxandra her scars. Luxandra's official cause of death was reported as being an accident, and Lyar informs her that her daughter died saving the lives of other people at the base. Lyar is also given her first clue as to the existence of Misaki Kureha when Luxandra's mother tells her to give her regards to the two cadets Luxandra always talked about.
Kiri's Brother Voiced by: Jun Fukuyama (Japanese); Blake Shepard (English)
Kiri's Brother makes an appearance in the last episode. Lyar informs Kiri's brother of her death at Watcher's Nest. He reveals she wrote a letter to him, and with it, a picture of the Kiri, Luxandra, Suzanna and Misaki from the fourth episode of Divergence Eve. This is the second clue Lyar receives in regards to the existence of Misaki Kureha.

== Music ==
1. Kiss Kiss Kiss by Nao Nagasawa
2. Sora by Nao Nagasawa
