= List of Inuyasha chapters (399–558) =

56th and final tankōbon volume cover, released by Shogakukan on February 18, 2009

The chapters of the Inuyasha manga series were written and illustrated by Rumiko Takahashi. The manga was serialized in Shogakukan's shōnen manga magazine Weekly Shōnen Sunday from 1996 to 2008. Chapters 399–558 were collected in 16 tankōbon volumes, consisting of volumes 41 to 56, released from August 8, 2005, to February 18, 2009.

In North America, Inuyasha has been licensed for English language release by Viz Media. Volumes 41 to 56 were released from October 13, 2009, to January 11, 2011.

== Volumes ==
| No. | Title | Original release date | English release date |
|---|---|---|---|
| 41 | Armor of a Demon | August 8, 2005; 4-09-127321-1 | October 13, 2009; 978-1-4215-2891-5 |
399. The Invincible Blade (最強の刀, Saikyō no Katana); 400. Meioju (冥王獣, Meiōjū); 401. The Armored Shell (鎧甲, Gaikō); 402. Moryomaru's Target (魍魎丸の狙い, Mōryōmaru no Nerai); 403. The Stolen Diamond Spears (奪われた金剛槍破, Ubawareta Kongōsōha); 404. Moryomaru's Transformation (魍魎丸の変化, Mōryōmaru no Henge); 405. Rivalry (拮抗, Kikkō); 406. Wrath (怒り, Ikari); 407. Sesshoumaru's Peril (殺生丸の危機, Sesshōmaru no Kiki); 408. Flight (逃走, Tōsō)
Tetsusaiga's new ability to absorb youki is too much for Inuyasha to handle and will eventually backfire on him. Mouryoumaru's flesh resurrects a Meioujuu, which said to have the strongest armored shields, to attack a castle containing armour made from one of its shields. It absorbs the armor, becoming strong enough to repel Inuyasha's adamant barrage when the group fights it. Mouryomaru absorbs the Meioujuu and gains its powers. Inuyasha's group goes with Sesshomaru, Kikyo, and Kohaku to face Mouryomaru's new body. Mouryoumaru taunts Sesshomaru about Kagura's death and Tokijin breaks against Mouryoumaru's body. Kikyo's arrow and the dragon-scaled Tetsusaiga force Mouryomaru to flee.
| 42 | Mixed Messages | October 18, 2005; 4-09-127322-X | November 10, 2009; 978-1-4215-2892-2 |
409. Deep Wounds (分岐, Bunki); 410. Meido Zangetsuha (冥道斬月破, Meidō Zangetsuha); 411. The Kind One (やさしい彼, Yasashī Hito); 412. Nikosen (二枯仙, Nikosen); 413. The Second Head (二つ目の首, Futatume no Kubi); 414. Life Force (精命幹, Seimeikan); 415. The Sage (仙気, Senki); 416. Kinka and Ginka (金禍銀禍, Kinka Ginka); 417. Strong Bonds (強い絆, Tsuyoi Kizuna); 418. The Blood's Effect (血の効きめ, Chi no Kikime)
Totosai appears in front of Sesshomaru, saying the Tenseiga called him, Totosai gives Tensaiga the power of Meidou Zangetsuha, which can cross paths between the realms of life and death. During Inuyasha's new-moon human phase, the group is attacked by the youkai Nikosen, who can survive decapitation. At sunrise, Tetsusaiga absorbs Nikosen's power, preventing backfire from using the dragon scale. Kanna flees from Naraku to tell Mouryoumaru about Kinka and Ginka, two brothers that share the same youkai body. Their power of shared blood would strengthen Mouryoumaru's armored shell.
| 43 | Demon Swamp | December 15, 2005; 4-09-127323-8 | December 8, 2009; 978-1-4215-2893-9 |
419. The Entrapped Brothers (罠におちた兄弟, Wana ni Ochita Kyōdai); 420. Ginka's Death (銀禍の死, Ginka no Shi); 421. Assimilation (同化, Dōka); 422. Tetsusaiga's Flames (鉄砕牙の炎, Tessaiga no Honō); 423. The Numawatari (沼渡, Numawatari); 424. The Transforming Waters (変化する水, Henge suru Mizu); 425. The Blade's Maturation (刀の成長, Katana no Seichō); 426. The Great Holy Demon Spirit (妖霊大聖, Yōreitaisei); 427. The Sealing Chains (封印の鎖, Fūin no Kusari); 428. Demon Vortex (妖穴, Yōketsu)
Mouryoumaru absorbs Ginga, but Tetsusaiga absorbs Kinga and Mouryoumaru escapes from the resulting resonance when Inuyasha attacks. Tetsusaiga completely fails to work against the youkai lake Numawatari, but Sesshomaru finishes it with the Meidou Zangetsuha. Totosai tells Inuyasha to recover Youreitaisei's innards, which will help him master the dragon scale Tetsusaiga without using the Nikosen's ability. While hunting the innards, Inuyasha learns about the Youketsu, youki whirlpools that have a relation with a youkai.
| 44 | Call of the Wolf Clan | February 17, 2006; 4-09-120088-5 | January 12, 2010; 978-1-4215-2994-3 |
429. The True Foe (本当の敵, Hontō no Teki); 430. Scent of the Demon Vortex (妖穴の臭い, Yōketsu no Nioi); 431. Training (修行, Shugyō); 432. Kai (灰, Kai); 433. Sundown (日没, Nichibotsu); 434. The Goraishi's Might (五雷指の威力, Goraishi no Iryoku); 435. Midoriko's Will (翠子の意思, Midoriko no Ishi); 436. Destruction (破壊, Hakai); 437. The Invisible Vortex (見えない妖穴, Mienai Yōketsu); 438. Koga's Decision (鋼牙の決意, Kōga no Ketsui)
Inuyasha's youkai opponents turn out to be an illusion from Youreitaisei for his training. Byakuya's yokai captures two brothers from Koga's clan, Kai and Shinta. The yokai use Kai to draw out Koga with an embedded jewel shard. Koga saves Shinta and exterminates the Byakuya's youkai with the power of Goraishi. Inuyasha's group fights Mouryoumaru, who takes Kai's shard and flees from Inuyasha's new ability to cut youketsu. Due to the condition of his legs, Koga decides to join Inuyasha's group and leave the two brothers with his companions.
| 45 | Triple Threat | May 18, 2006; 4-09-120350-7 | February 9, 2010; 978-1-4215-2995-0 |
439. Yomeiju (溶命樹, Yōmeiju); 440. Yomeiju's Power (溶命樹の力, Yōmeiju no Chikara); 441. Confrontation (対峙, Taiji); 442. Absorption (吸収, Kyūshū); 443. Naraku Eradicated (奈落消滅, Naraku Shōmetsu); 444. Heated Battle (苦戦, Kusen); 445. The Infant's Mistake (赤子の誤算, Akago no Gosan); 446. Erosion (侵蝕, Shinshoku); 447. Divine Protection (加護, Kago); 448. The Poison of the Miasma (瘴気の傷, Shōki no Kizu)
Naraku uses a jewel shard to revive and absorb Youmeiju, a tree destroying barriers and absorbs yokai. Koga meets Kikyo who tries to take his Shikon fragments. Koga fights despite knowing that because of Midoriko's will, his legs will not move in battle. Mouryomaru absorbs Naraku, merging the Shikon jewel inside, and takes the shards from Koga's legs. Naraku reappears inside Mouryomaru and uses the Youmeiju's ability to absorb Akago, Naraku's heart. The Yourouzoku's elders help Koga escape at the last moment, exposing Naraku's heart. Miroku tries to consume it with the wind tunnel, even at the price of his life, but Inuyasha stops him and Naraku runs away. Kikyo purifies the miasma inside Miroku's body.
| 46 | Lost Love | July 18, 2006; 4-09-120558-5 | March 9, 2010; 978-1-4215-2996-7 |
449. Yama'arashi (山嵐, Yama Arashi); 450. The Herd (群れ, Mure); 451. The Valley of Miasma (瘴気の谷, Shōki no Tani); 452. Spider Silk (蜘蛛の糸, Kumo no Ito); 453. The Clinging Strands (絡みつく糸, Karamitsuku Ito); 454. Beyond the Strands (糸のむこう, Ito no Mukō); 455. The Broken Bowstring (切れた弦, Kireta Tsuru); 456. Mount Azusa (梓山, Azusa-yama); 457. The Spirit of the Mountain (梓山の精霊, Azusa-yama no Seirei); 458. A Vision of Kikyo (桔梗の幻, Kikyō no Maboroshi)
Naraku's Kongosouha spears are controlling the corpses of poisonous porcupine-demons. Miroku is still resting in Sango's care when they attack, but the rest of the group comes back to defeat the porcupines. Naraku traps Kikyo, Inuyasha and Kagome, with spiderwebs in the sky, worsening the miasma in Kikyo's body. Kagome cannot purify it because the webs have touched the malice. Inuyasha and Kikyo stay behind while the others search for a bow that can heal the miasma. Sesshomaru prevents Byakuya from catching Kohaku. Kagome and the others come to Mount Azusa, whose spirit tests her, breaks her malice, and gives her the bow to save Kikyo.
| 47 | Yin and Yang | November 17, 2006; 4-09-120680-8 | April 13, 2010; 978-1-4215-2997-4 |
459. Trapped Companions (絡め捕られた仲間, Karametorareta Nakama); 460. Hearts Linked (流れ込む心, Nagarekomu Kokoro); 461. The Opened Body (開かれた体, Hirakareta Karada); 462. The Vanished Jewel (玉の行方, Tama no Yukue); 463. The Purifying Arrow (浄化の矢, Jōka no Ya); 464. Sunset (落日, Rakujitsu); 465. The Lights (光, Hikari); 466. Parting Thoughts (別れの想い, Wakare no Omoi); 467. The Meido (冥道, Meidō); 468. The Great Darkness (冥界の闇, Meikai no Yami)
While Inuyasha fetches Kagome, Naraku's spiderwebs capture the rest of the group. The webs connect Naraku with Kikyo, who transfers the Shikon Jewel into her body so he can avoid purification when he gets Koga's leg shards. Kagome shoots a sacred arrow into Kikyo's chest, purifying the jewel and redirecting the power to Naraku, but Naraku escapes with the nearly-complete jewel and leaves Kikyo powerless and dying. Inuyasha carries her away from the others so the two of them can talk about their past happiness. Finally at peace, she smiles at Inuyasha, who kisses her before she disappears into orbs of light that the soul-collectors carry away. Koga leaves with his comrades. Sesshomaru visits his mother, seeking mastery of the full circle meidou. When she opens the meidou stone that Inuyasha's father entrusted to her, it releases a hellhound immune to Sesshomaru's attacks. It eats Rin and Kohaku and runs back into the meidou; Sesshomaru pursues it and cuts it in half to save them. The road to hell starts to collapse, forcing Sesshomaru's group toward hell.
| 48 | Feeding Frenzy | January 13, 2007; 4-09-120810-X | May 11, 2010; 978-1-4215-2998-1 |
469. The Guardian of the Underworld (冥界の主, Meikai no Nushi); 470. The Return (帰還, Kikan); 471. A Merciful Heart (慈悲の心, Jihi no Kokoro); 472. The Flower Prince (花皇, Kaō); 473. Tears of Blood (血の涙, Chi no Namida); 474. The Wounded Soul (傷付いた心, Kizutsuita Kokoro); 475. Mirror (鏡, Kagami); 476. My Enemy... Tetsusaiga (敵は鉄砕牙, Teki wa Tessaiga); 477. Inuyasha's Demon Power (犬夜叉の妖力, Inuyasha no Yōryoku); 478. The Mirror's Shadow (鏡の影, Kagami no Kage)
Kohaku survives because his life is bound with the jewel shard, but the darkness takes Rin. Tenseiga cannot revive her a second time, even when Sesshomaru attacks the master of hell. His fear of losing Rin opens the path between worlds and strengthens Tenseiga. Sesshomaru's mother uses her necklace to save Rin. Inuyasha's group find a village plagued by Kaou, a yokai that consumes people's pain and suffering. Kaou reveals the unhappiness about Kikyo in Inuyasha's and Kagome's hearts before they defeat him. Naraku orders Kanna to open her mirror near Inuyasha, forming a phantom copy of Tetsusaiga. Inuyasha manages to retain full consciousness as his yokai blood takes over. When he smashes at the phantom mirror, Kanna takes the damage instead. Kanna creates a shadow circle to throw beams at Inuyasha. Inuyasha reflects the beams with Tetsusaiga, causing it and Kanna to start cracking.
| 49 | Down to the Bone | April 18, 2007; 4-09-121027-9 | June 8, 2010; 978-1-4215-2999-8 |
479. Null (無, Mu); 480. Last Words (最後の言葉, Saigo no Kotoba); 481. Bones (骨, Hone); 482. Wanted: Boomerang Bone (狙われた飛来骨, Nerawareta Hiraikotsu); 483. The Cage of Bones (骨の檻, Hone no Ori); 484. The Poison Salve (溶毒, Yōdoku); 485. Master of Potions (薬老毒仙, Yakurō Dokusen); 486. Inside the Urn (甕の中, Kame no Naka); 487. Way of Life (生き方, Ikikata); 488. The Response (答え, Kotae)
Inuyasha breaks the copied Tetsusaiga and recovers all the abilities. Kanna explodes, showing Kagome a white point inside the Shikon Jewel with her last words: "The light will kill Naraku." During the new moon, the group finds a place haunted by a bone-manipulating yokai. Miroku and Sango confront the yokai, which is looking for bones to heal its sick father. The yokai decides to make medicine out of Sango's boomerang and captures them in a bone cage. Kirara escapes to warn Inuyasha, Kagome and Shippo. Miroku gets poisoned to save his life, Sango is forced to destroy the yokai's father and her boomerang. Inuyasha defeats the youkai. The group goes to Yakurou Dokusen to fix Sango's weapon and heal Miroku.
| 50 | Green Monster | July 18, 2007; 4-09-121156-9 | July 13, 2010; 978-1-4215-3000-0 |
489. A Complete Meido (完全な冥道, Kanzenna Meidou); 490. Tenseiga's Secret (天生牙の秘密, Tenseiga no Himitsu); 491. Tetsusaiga and Tenseiga (鉄砕牙と天生牙, Tessaiga to Tenseiga); 492. A Father's True Intention (父の真意, Chichi no Shin'i); 493. Resonance (共鳴, Kyoumei); 494. Two Worlds (ふたつの世界, Futatsu no Sekai); 495. The Path Ahead (その先の考え, Sono Saki no Kangae); 496. Trap (仕掛け, Shikake); 497. Kohaku's Head (琥珀の首, Kohaku no Kubi); 498. The New Hiraikotsu (新生 飛来骨, Shinsei Hiraikotsu)
Inuyasha and Sesshomaru fight their father's old foe Shishinki, who turns out to be the source of the Meidou Zangetsuha power that Tensaiga was built to contain. As the brothers fight side by side, Tensaiga resonates with Tetsusaiga and finally forms the full-circle Meidou Zangetsuha, defeating Shishinki. Tetsusaiga absorbs the Meidou Zangetsuha power from Tensaiga, angering Sesshomaru. Byakuya takes on Inuyasha's group except for Sango, who uses her new and stronger boomerang to stop Naraku from reaching Kohaku.
| 51 | Outfoxed | October 18, 2007; 4-09-121198-4 | August 10, 2010; 978-1-4215-3001-7 |
499. The Enchanted Shard (妖の破片, Ayakashi no Kakera); 500. The True Heir (継承者, Keishōsha); 501. Reflux (還流, Kanryū); 502. Proof (証, Akashi); 503. The Black Blade (黒い刃, Kuroi Yaiba); 504. The Meido's Light (冥道の光, Meidō no Hikari); 505. The Fox Inn (狐の宿, Kitsune no Yado); 506. Exam Number 77 (受験番号七七, Jukenbangō Nana Nana); 507. Hitomiko (瞳子, Hitomiko); 508. The Priestess's Barrier (巫女の結界, Miko no Kekkai)
Intending to absorb Tetsusaiga's powers, Sesshoumaru adds the last fragment of Kanna's mirror to Tensaiga, but it breaks when he fights Inuyasha, creating the Black Tetsusaiga with the full-circle Meidou Zangetsuha power. Shippo takes the kitsune exam for advanced demon magic and gets promoted to lower senior 8th rank for fooling Inuyasha. The group pursues one of Naraku's spiderwebs to a village. The spiderwebs manipulate the dead body of the village miko, Hitomiko, into separating Kagome from the rest of the group to attack her.
| 52 | Transformations | January 18, 2008; 4-09-121267-0 | September 14, 2010; 978-1-4215-3002-4 |
509. The Bow's Power (弓の霊力, Yumi no Reiryoku); 510. Hell (地獄, Jigoku); 511. Kagome's Power (かごめの霊力, Kagome no Reiryoku); 512. The Correct Wish (正しい願い, Tadashī Negai); 513. The Jewel's Will (玉の邪念, Tama no Janen); 514. Peril (危機, Kiki); 515. The Borrowed Body (借り物の体, Karimono no Karada); 516. Magatsuhi (曲霊, Magatsuhi); 517. Magatsuhi's True Body (曲霊の本体, Magatsuhi no Hontai); 518. Bakusaiga (爆砕牙, Bakusaiga)
Kagome uses her bow's spiritual power to escape from Hitomiko, who tells her that something is sealing her power. Naraku creates a new detachment, Magatsuhi, which acts unlike his previous detachments and is the evil spirit of the Shikon Jewel itself. Looking for the last jewel shard, Magatsuhi attacks Sesshomaru, who is at a disadvantage without the Meidou Zangetsuha and one arm. Inuyasha's group comes to support Sesshomaru, whose missing arm regenerates with the new sword Bakusaiga. Magatsuhi retreats. Totosai explains that liberated from the need for Tetsusaiga, Sesshomaru has now surpassed his father in power.
| 53 | Direct Attack | April 18, 2008; 4-09-121339-1 | October 12, 2010; 978-1-4215-3003-1 |
519. Magatsuhi's Shade (曲霊の影, Magatsuhi no Kage); 520. The Day of Days (人生の一大事, Jinsei no Ichidaiji); 521. The Shadow (影, Kage); 522. Possessed (憑依, Hyoui); 523. Sango's Wish (珊瑚の願い, Sango no Negai); 524. Awakening (目覚め, Mezame); 525. Release (解放, Kaihō); 526. The Vanishing Powers (戻らない霊力, Modoranai Reiryoku); 527. A Life Once Lost (なかった命, Nakatta Inochi); 528. From Here On Out (これから, Kore Kara)
Magatsuhi seals off Kagome's spiritual power, leaving her unable to purify Kohaku's tainted shard. She returns to modern Tokyo to take her high school entrance exams. Magatsuhi implants part of himself into Kohaku to make him run toward Naraku, but Sesshomaru breaks his control. When Naraku captures Kagome, Kohaku uses Kikyo's light to destroy Naraku's body. Naraku takes the last jewel shard from Kohaku. Magatsuhi possesses Rin.
| 54 | United Front | July 11, 2008; 4-09-121428-2 | November 9, 2010; 978-1-4215-3004-8 |
529. The Jewel Completed (玉の完成, Tama no Kansei); 530. Graduation (卒業, Sotsugyou); 531. Cloud of Evil (邪気の雲海, Jaki no Unkai); 532. Inside Naraku (奈落の体内, Naraku no Tainai); 533. A Trace of the Jewel (玉の気配, Tama no Kehai); 534. The Miasma Arrow (瘴気の矢, Shouki no Ya); 535. Naraku's Darkness (奈落の闇, Naraku no Yami); 536. The Wind Tunnel's Limit (風穴の限界, Kazāna no Genkai); 537. The Last Bit of Reason (最後の理性, Saigo no Risei); 538. The Scent of Kagome's Blood (かごめの血の匂い, Kagome no Chi no Nioi)
Kikyo's light detaches from the last jewel shard to remain in Kohaku's body and save his life, but without the light, the shard becomes tainted like the rest of the Shikon jewel. When Kagome returns from her middle-school graduation, Naraku uses the complete Shikon jewel to transform into a gigantic spider with Rin inside his body. Inuyasha's group and Sesshoumaru enter Naraku's body to save Rin, but Naraku uses the tainted jewel to take advantage of the darkness in their hearts. Magatsuhi possesses Inuyasha to make him fight Sesshomaru. Kagome tries to use Tetsusaiga to return Inuyasha back to normal.
| 55 | Power of the Jewel | October 17, 2008; 4-09-121480-0 | December 14, 2010; 978-1-4215-3005-5 |
539. Entrapped (捕らえる, Toraeru); 540. The Light Reborn (よみがえった光, Yomigaetta Hikari); 541. A Trap of Light (光の罠, Hikari no Wana); 542. Light Devoured (飲みこまれる光, Nomikoma Reru Hikari); 543. The Vanishing Arrow (消える矢, Kieru Ya); 544. The Center (中心, Chūshin); 545. Despair (絶望, Zetsubou); 546. Naraku's Desire (奈落の望み, Naraku no Nozomi); 547. A Cutting Meido (斬る冥道, Kiru Mei Dou); 548. Byakuya's Blade (白夜の刃, Byakuya no Ha)
Sesshomaru kills Magatsuhi to restore Kagome's spiritual powers. Naraku tries to make Sango kill Rin. Kagome fires an arrow at Naraku, preventing Miroku from fatally overstraining his Wind Tunnel. Naraku's body start to collapse from the combined attack of Tetsusaiga's Meidou Zangetsuha and Sesshoumaru's new sword Bakusaiga. Byakuya attacks Kagome. Inuyasha kills him with the Meidou.
| 56 | Curtain of Time | February 18, 2009; 4-09-121580-7 | January 11, 2011; 978-1-4215-3299-8 |
549. Amassing For Battle (終結, Shūketsu); 550. Collapse (崩壊, Houkai); 551. The Plunge (落下, Rakka); 552. The Death of Naraku (奈落の死, Naraku no Shi); 553. The Well Transformed (井戸の異変, Ido no Ihen); 554. High School Life (高校生活, Koukou Seikatsu); 555. The Darkness (闇, Yami); 556. Destiny (運命, Unmei); 557. I Want To See You (会いたい, Aitai); 558. Tomorrow (明日, Ashita)
With the help of Sesshomaru's Bakusaiga, Inuyasha destroys Naraku with Meidou Zangetsuha. Kagome shoots an arrow through the Shikon Jewel to purify Naraku's soul from the material world, but the jewel grants his last wish. She disappears into another Meidou created by Byakuya's attack. Inside the Meidou, the jewel tries to tempt Kagome into wishing to return to her world, which would leave the jewel completely tainted. Inuyasha uses the Meidou to find Kagome, then destroying the jewel and Naraku. No longer fearing abandonment, she wishes that the jewel would disappear forever. Three years later, Miroku and Sango have three children. Shippou is now a senior 7th rank in the Kitsune demon magic exam. Kohaku is strengthening his demon-slaying skills alongside Kirara. The old flea Myoga is with Totosai and Rin with Kaede (often visited by Sesshoumaru and Jaken). Kagome returns to the Feudal Era and decides to stay forever there with Inuyasha.
