= Endō =

Endō, Endo, Endou or Endoh (written: 遠藤, literally 'far-off wisteria' and short for 'Fujiwara in Enshu') is the 38th most common Japanese surname. Notable people with the surname include:

- Ado Endoh (遠藤 あど; born 1973), Japanese actress
- Akari Endo (born 1989), Dominican-Japanese actress
- Akifumi Endō (遠藤 章史; born 1964), Japanese voice actor
- Akihiro Endō (遠藤 彰弘; born 1975), Japanese footballer
- Akira Endo (disambiguation), multiple people
- Arata Endo (遠藤 新; 1889–1951), Japanese architect
- Aya Endō (遠藤 綾; born 1980), Japanese voice actress
- Ayumi Endō (遠藤 あゆみ), Japanese artist
- Chujiro Endo (遠藤 忠二郎; 1917–?), Japanese baseball player
- Genichi Endo (遠藤 元一; born 1994), Japanese footballer
- Harry Endo (1922–2009), American actor
- Hiroki Endo (遠藤 浩輝; born 1970), Japanese manga artist
- Hiroyuki Endo (遠藤 大由; born 1986), Japanese badminton player
- Issei Endō (遠藤 一星; born 1989), Japanese baseball player
- Jun Endo (遠藤 純; born 2000), Japanese women's footballer
- Junki Endo (遠藤 純輝; born 1994), Japanese footballer
- Kaname Endo (遠藤 要; born 1983), Japanese actor
- Keisuke Endo (遠藤 敬佑; born 1989), Japanese footballer
- Keita Endo (遠藤 渓太; born 1997), Japanese footballer
- Kenichi Endō (遠藤 憲一; born 1961), Japanese actor and writer
- Kenny Endo (born 1953), American taiko musician
- Endō Kinsuke (遠藤 謹助; 1836–1893), Japanese statesman
- Kosuke Endo (遠藤 幸佑; born 1980), Japanese rugby union player
- Mai Endo (遠藤 舞; born 1988), Japanese idol and singer
- Mana Endo (遠藤 愛; born 1971), Japanese tennis player
- Masaaki Endoh (遠藤 正明; born 1967), Japanese singer-songwriter
- Masahiro Endo (遠藤 雅大; born 1970), Japanese footballer
- Masanobu Endō (遠藤 雅伸; born 1959), Japanese video game designer
- Masashi Endō (遠藤 雅; born 1974), Japanese actor
- Masataka Endoh (遠藤 政隆; born 1972), Japanese baseball player
- Michiro Endo (遠藤 ミチロウ; 1950–2019), Japanese musician
- Mikio Endō (遠藤 幹雄; born 1967), Japanese composer, music arranger and producer
- Miyako Endō (遠藤 みやこ; born 1965), Japanese voice actress
- Morinobu Endo (遠藤 守信; born 1946), Japanese physicist and chemist
- Endō Motonobu (遠藤 基信; 1532–1585), Japanese samurai
- Endō Naotsune (遠藤 直経; 1531–1570), Japanese samurai
- Nic Endo (born 1976), Japanese-German-American noise musician
- Nobuhiko Endō (遠藤 宣彦; born 1963), Japanese politician
- Otohiko Endō (遠藤 乙彦; born 1947), Japanese politician
- Rina Endō (遠藤 璃菜; born 2005), Japanese actress
- Ryohei Endo (遠藤 良平; born 1976), Japanese baseball player
- Ryuji Endo (遠藤 竜志; born 1976), Japanese baseball player
- Seiichi Endo (遠藤 誠一; 1960–2018), Japanese cult member
- Seishiro Endo (遠藤 征四郎; born 1942), Japanese aikidoka
- Shigeru Endo (遠藤 茂; born 1945), Japanese sport wrestler
- Sho Endo (遠藤 尚; born 1990), Japanese freestyle skier
- Endō Shōta (遠藤 聖大; born 1990), Japanese sumo wrestler
- Shōzō Endō (遠藤 章造; born 1971), member of the comedy duo Cocorico
- Shūsaku Endō (遠藤 周; 1923–1996) Japanese Roman Catholic writer
- Sumio Endo (遠藤 純男; born 1950), Japanese judoka
- Tadashi Endo (born 1947), Japanese butoh dancer
- Takahiro Endo (遠藤 孝弘; born 1968), Japanese footballer
- Takehiko Endo (遠藤 武彦; 1938–2019), Japanese politician
- Takumi Endoh (遠藤 卓実; born 1984), Japanese motorcycle racer
- Tatsuo Endō (actor) (遠藤 太津朗; 1928–2012), Japanese actor
- Tatsuo Endo (engineer) (遠藤 達雄; 1925–1989), Japanese engineer
- Tetsuya Endo (disambiguation), multiple people
- Tomotaka Endo (born 1995), Japanese squash player
- Toshiaki Endo (遠藤 利明; born 1950), Japanese politician
- Tsubasa Endoh (遠藤 翼; born 1993), Japanese footballer
- Tsukasa Endo (遠藤 司; born 1961), Japanese long-distance runner
- Wataru Endo (遠藤 航; born 1993), Japanese footballer
- Yasuhito Endō (遠藤 保仁; born 1980), Japanese footballer
- Yasushi Endo (遠藤 康; born 1988), Japanese footballer
- Yoichi Endo (遠藤 与一; 1916–?), Japanese rower
- Yuka Endo (遠藤 由華; born 1991), Japanese rhythmic gymnast
- Yukio Endo (遠藤 幸雄; 1937–2009), Japanese artistic gymnast
- Yurika Endō (遠藤 ゆり; born 1994), Japanese voice actress and singer
- Yuya Endo (遠藤 雄弥; born 1987), Japanese actor and singer

== Fictional characters ==
- Kousuke Endo (遠藤 浩介, Endo Kosuke), a character in the light novel series Arifureta
