= List of Nippon Professional Baseball players (E) =

The following is a list of Nippon Professional Baseball players with the last name starting with E, retired or active.

== E ==
- Nobuyuki Ebisu
- Angel Echevarria
- Suguru Egawa
- Tomoaki Egawa
- Ryosuke Eguchi
- Takayoshi Eguchi
- Hirotaka Egusa
- Akira Ejiri
- Shintaro Ejiri
- Narciso Elvira
- Yutaka Enatsu
- Masataka Endoh
- Ryohei Endoh
- Ryuji Endoh
- Yasuhiro Enoki
- Masaaki Esaka
- Akira Etoh
- Shinichi Etoh
- Tom Evans
