= Ayu =

Ayu or AYU may refer to:

- Ayu (given name)
- Ayu sweetfish (Plecoglossus altivelis), a species of smelt
- Ayu, a local name for the African manatee
- Ayu (singer) or Ayumi Hamasaki, Japanese singer
- Ayu Islands, a small archipelago in Indonesia
- Ayu, Dawei, a village in Burma
- Ayu language, a language of Nigeria
- Aiyura Airport, IATA code AYU

== See also ==
- Ayu-Dag, a peak in Crimea, Ukraine
- Ayumi, a Japanese name
