= Ryuho =

Ryuho may refer to:

- Ryuho Okawa (born 1956), founder of Happy Science (a new Japanese religion)
- Ryūhō Masayoshi (born 1977), Japanese sumo wrestler
- Ryuho, a character from the anime series s-CRY-ed
- Japanese aircraft carrier Ryūhō
