= Ginzō Matsuo =

Japanese actor (1951–2001)

- 松尾 銀三
- Born: Kōichi Matsuo (松尾廣一); December 26, 1951; Nakatsu, Ōita, Japan
- Died: August 25, 2001 (aged 49)
- Occupations: Actor; voice actor; narrator
- Agent: Aoni Production

Ginzō Matsuo (松尾 銀三, Matsuo Ginzō; December 26, 1951 – August 25, 2001) was a Japanese actor, voice actor and narrator born in Nakatsu, Oita, Japan as Kōichi Matsuo (松尾廣一, Matsuo Kōichi). He was part of Aoni Production at the time of his death, but he established Gin Production in 1997. He was most known for the roles of Hemu-Hemu in Nintama Rantarō and Ginnosuke Nohara in Crayon Shin-chan.

On August 25, 2001, he died from acute subarachnoid hemorrhage, at the age of 49.

His final roles were Captain Smoker in One Piece, Biff in s-CRY-ed and Taizo Kotobuki in Super GALS!.

== Voices roles ==
- Akuma-kun as Palbados
- Art of Fighting as Jack Turner
- Billy Inu Nandemo Shokai as Daichi-Sensei; Doga
- Biriken as Doka
- Brave Police J-Decker as Chieftain
- Crayon Shin-chan as Ginnosuke Nohara
- Cutey Honey Flash as Danbei
- Digimon Adventure as TonosamaGekomon
- Digimon Adventure 02 as TonosamaGekomon
- Digimon Tamers: Battle of Adventurers as Wataru Urazoe
- Doraemon: Nobita's Adventure in Clockwork City as Hokuro
- Dragon Ball Z as Farmer (ep 1)
- Eden's Bowy as Gilgamesh; Oltron
- El Hazard as King
- Escaflowne: The Movie as Kio; Ruhm
- Ghost in the Shell as Old man
- Gigantor FX as Elvis brothers
- Harbor Light Monogatari – Fashion Lala Yori as Big guy
- InuYasha as Grandpa Higurashi, Buyo
- Jigoku Sensei Nube as Masaru Kaneda, The Principal
- Jungle Emperor Leo: Hon-o-ji as Tommy
- Kindaichi Shōnen no Jikenbo as manager (ep 74); Tokuichi Genbu
- Kinkyuu Hasshin Saver Kids as Omega
- Kinnikuman Nisei movie as Seiuchin
- Lost Universe as Weapons dealer (ep 10)
- Macross 7 the Movie: The Galaxy's Calling Me! as Miguel
- Magic User's Club as Master (ep 4)
- Mahou Tsukai Sally 2 as Spirit of Insect
- Manmaru the Ninja Penguin as Borot
- Mobile Fighter G Gundam as Queen The Spade
- Mobile Suit Gundam 0083: Stardust Memory as Alloys Mozley
- Mobile Suit Victory Gundam as Jinn Gehennam
- Neo Ranga as Yoshiyuki Takesue
- Nintama Rantarō as Hemu Hemu
- Ojamajo Doremi as Alexander T. Oyajiide
- One Piece as Captain Smoker
- Porco Rosso
- Red Baron as Doctor Asimov
- s-CRY-ed as Biff
- Sailor Moon S as Vice Principal (ep 97)
- Sailor Moon Sailor Stars as Police Chief/Sailor Cop (ep 182)
- Sakigake!! Otokojuku as Edogawa
- Street Fighter II: The Movie as Dee Jay
- Super GALS! Kotobuki Ran as Taizo Kotobuki
- Sword for Truth as Kagairo
- Tenchi Muyo Movie 2: Daughter of Darkness
- Thomas and the Magic Railroad (Japanese dub) as Diesel 10
- The Vision of Escaflowne as Kyo, Rum, Sorcerer
- Virtua Fighter as Yan Weimin, Yan Honron
- Wicked City as Airport Demon
- Yume no Crayon Oukoku as Tofumon

=== Other Japanese ===
- Pinocchio's Daring Journey (Captain Doc)

== Successors ==
- Keiichi Sonobe – (Dragon Ball Kai as Farmer)
- Mahito Ōba – (One Piece as Captain Smoker)
- Bin Shimada – (Nintama Rantarō as Hemu-Hemu), (s-CRY-ed as Biff in episode 22)
- Fumihiko Tachiki – (Super GALS! as Taizo Kotobuki, Ghost in the Shell 2.0 as Old Man)
- Chō – (Crayon Shin-chan as Ginnosuke Nohara, s-CRY-ed Alteration as Biff)
- Takumi Yamazaki – (Kinnikuman Nisei as Seiuchin)
- Nobuaki Kanemitsu – (Ojamajo Doremi as Alexander T. Oyajide)
- Katsumi Suzuki – (InuYasha as Kagome's grandfather, New Century Brave Wars as Chieftain)
- Yasuhiro Mamiya – (Super Robot Wars 30 as Cheiftain)
- Hisao Egawa – (Nintama Rantarō as Narukane Tochidaemon)
- Chafurin – (the PSP version of Tengai Makyō: Daiyon no Mokushiroku as Chief Bull)
- Naoki Tatsuta (Umeboshi Denka & Doraemon: Papparopan's SuperPappa! as Gonsuke)
- Shinpachi Tsuji – (SD Gundam G Generation Spirits as Jinn Gehenam)
- Tetsu Inada – (SD Gundam G Generation Over World as Broom Brooks)
- Koichi Yamadera – (Anpanman as Tamagoyakikarou, Yuzujiiya)
- Daiki Nakamura – (Anpanman as Yuzujiiya)
