= List of S-CRY-ed episodes =

Cover of the first s-CRY-ed DVD released in North America.

s-CRY-ed, also known as s.CRY.ed or Scryed, is a 26 episode Japanese anime television series. It is produced by Sunrise, directed by Gorō Taniguchi and written by Yōsuke Kuroda. S-CRY-ed first aired in Japan on TV Tokyo and Animax. The series is set in an alternative time where in Kanagawa Prefecture a phenomenon granted a 1% of its people supernatural powers known as "Alters". The plot follows a young Alter mercenary known as Kazuma as well as Ryuho, a man working for the Alter special forces known as HOLY who become rivals as their areas clash.

In Japan, the series was released in 2001 between July 4 and December 26 for a total of twenty-six episodes. These were collected in a total of nine DVD volumes by Bandai Visual between November 25, 2001, and July 25, 2002. A DVD box containing all episodes was released on January 25, 2008 whereas a Blu-ray box was made available on October 26, 2011.

The anime was licensed by Bandai Entertainment in early 2003. Starting in 2003, Bandai released the show in North America as six individual Region 1 volumes, followed by a complete six-disc box set in November 2004. Bandai's European branch Beez Entertainment published the series in the United Kingdom. The release was in a total of six DVD volumes released between June 6, 2005, and February 27, 2006. Later, the series premiered on Cartoon Network's Adult Swim in the United States on May 29, 2005, after select episodes had been aired on Adult Swim's Video On Demand service for nearly a year. On September 27, 2005, Bandai re-released s-CRY-ed under the Anime Legends banner, in three two-disc volumes, followed by the Anime Legends Complete Collection on October 24, 2006. Following the 2012 closure of Bandai Entertainment, Sunrise announced at Otakon 2013, that Sentai Filmworks has rescued S-CRY-ed, along with a handful of other former BEI titles.

The music of S-CRY-ed was composed by Kōtarō Nakagawa. Its original soundtrack was released on November 21, 2001, whereas two drama CDs were released on December 19 of the same year. For the first twenty-five episodes the opening and ending are "Reckless Fire" by Yasuaki Ide and "Drastic My Soul" by Mikio Sakai, respectively. However, for episode twenty-six, "Reckless Fire" is replaced by "Drastic My Soul" whereas the ending theme is "Tabidachi no Kane ga Naru" ("The Bell of Setting out for a Journey Will Ring") by Mikio Sakai. There are also three insert song starting with "All I Need Is Love" by Sakai for episodes fourteen and seventeen, "Magma" by Ide for episode nineteen and "Discovery" by Sakai. Both the singles of "Reckless Fire" and "Drastic My Soul" were released on August 22, 2001.

== Episodes list ==
| No. | Title | Storyboard by | Directed by | Written by | Original air date | English air date |
|---|---|---|---|---|---|---|
| 1 | "Kazuma" (Japanese: カズマ) | Gorō Taniguchi | Tsuyoshi Yoshimoto | July 4, 2001 | May 29, 2005 | |
Born with the supernatural power known as Alter, a young mercenary named Kazuma takes a job to rescue a representative of HOLY, an Alter group from the city. After returning to his home known as the Lost Ground, he gives his mission's prize to a child whose father was sick. Returning to his home, his housemate Kanami Yuta, who is unaware of his being an Alter, is disappointed by the fact he could not bring any money home. Later, Kazuma's partner Kunihiko Kimishima, gets him a job to beat another Alter bandit, Biff. Kazuma is successful in his mission but is confronted by the forces of HOLY. While buying Kimishima time to escape, Kazuma faces HOLY's Alter soldier Ryuho but is easily defeated.
| 2 | "Ryuho"; Transliteration: "Ryūhō" (Japanese: 劉鳳) | Gorō Taniguchi | Hirokazu Yamada | July 11, 2001 | June 5, 2005 | |
Scientist Mimori Kiryu remembers how seven years ago she travelled with her father to a party where she met a young Ryuho. When Mimori revealed her interest in Alters, a scared Ryuho accidentally revealed his Alter ability and created a crystal which Mimori later kept as proof of their friendship. Back to the present, Mimori joins the HOLY special forces where she meets a now cold Ryuho whereas their leader, Martin Zigmar, warns her of her possible issues due to how Alters are treated. Cougar later takes her to the Lost Grounds where Mimori is sees Ryuho defeat Kazuma.
| 3 | "Holy"; Transliteration: "Hōrī" (Japanese: ホーリー) | Sumio Watanabe | Shintarō Itoga | July 18, 2001 | June 12, 2005 | |
The episode starts with Ryuho seeing un unknown Alter user killing his dog and mother, causing him to awaken his true Alter, Zetsuei. Afterwards, the series jumps to the events set after Kazuma's defeat, where he is detained by HOLY. In contrast to other prisoners, Kazuma just wants to fight Ryuho again who interrogates him about the Alter user he wants to kill. As Mimori tries to save Kazuma due to his punishment, Kazuma takes her hostage to escape from the city. When Cougar reaches them, they are briefly in shock to see each other. Kimishima then appears and helps Kazuma return to the Lost Ground. Back there, Kazuma greets Kanami who has been concerned about him.
| 4 | "Big Magnum"; Transliteration: "Biggu Magunamu" (Japanese: ビッグ・マグナム) | Rion Kujō | Rion Kujō | July 25, 2001 | June 19, 2005 | |
Kazuma goes to the farm to work with Kanami but ends escaping when Kimishima offers a better job. He meets an Alter user named Ayase Terasada whose younger brother and other natives were taken by HOLY's Tatsunami. During the night, both Kazuma and Ayase work together to take down the guards while Kimishima frees the natives, however Tatsunami takes Ayase hostage. While Kimishima gives up, Kazuma is unwilling to give up and prepares to attack him. Seeing this, Kimishima attacks Tatsunami while Kazuma finishes him. Satisfied with the job, Kazuma goes back to the farm to conclude his work with Kanami.
| 5 | "Mimori Kiryu"; Transliteration: "Kiryū Mimori" (Japanese: 桐生水守) | Fuyu Kuroki | Shigeki Takagi | August 1, 2001 | June 26, 2005 | |
Mimori decides to go to the Lost Ground to treat wounded people in need. When Kazuma is back from another job, he and Kimishima find Kanami sick. Without a doctor in the Lost Ground to treat her, Kazuma and Kinishima request Mimori's help which she agrees to work. While Kanami is treated, Kazuma is confronted by HOLY soldier Asuka Tachibana who was sent to bodyguard Mimori. Kazuma proves to be too much for Tachibana and manages to defeat him. This brings surprise to fellow HOLY members, as Kazuma becomes their primary target.
| 6 | "Zetsuei" (Japanese: 絶影) | Gorō Taniguchi | Tsuyoshi Yoshimoto | August 8, 2001 | July 3, 2005 | |
Zigmar is pressured by the Mainland and is forced to conduct the 'Great Alter Hunt'. After helping an injured alter user, Kazuma and Kimishima realize they have to take a stand against HOLY. As a result, Kimishima gathers Ayase, Biff, and other Alter users. However, during the fated battle along a beach, HOLY's soldiers Scheris Adjani, Elian, and Urizane take the upper hand. Kazuma forces Ryuho to bring out the full strength of Zetsuei but is interrupted by Tachibana. Having lost his membership of HOLY for his previous defeat, Tachibana tries to defeat Kazuma but both are missing in action after a landslide.
| 7 | "Asuka Tachibana"; Transliteration: "Tachibana Asuka" (Japanese: 橘あすか) | Masaki Kitamura | Hirokazu Yamada | August 15, 2001 | July 10, 2005 | |
Trapped in a cave, Kazuma and Tachibana agree to work together until they reach a way out. As both rest, Tachibana asks Kazuma why he ever considered going to the city, to which he responds he wants to defeat HOLY for attacking his home. When they continue, Kazuma and Tachibana defeat a giant monster created by a small animal's Alter. Realizing he attacked its home, Kazuma and Tachibana agree to let it free before their last fight. While Kazuma wins, he encourages Tachibana to follow his own way rather than moving through the current. Returning to the beach, Kazuma finds Kimishima badly injured while nearly every other Alter was captured.
| 8 | "Mad Sprict"; Transliteration: "Maddo Supurikuto" (Japanese: 最悪の脚本 (マッド・スプリクト)) | Shinji Takamatsu | Shintarō Itoga | August 22, 2001 | July 17, 2005 | |
Kazuma goes to the city to rescue Ayase and the others by joining HOLY much to their confusion. As Ryuho expresses doubts, Zigmar tells him he will be under the control of HOLY member Unkei and his Madscript. Mimori introduces Kazuma to the city and they bond. The next day while training, Ryuho challenges Kazuma to a boxing match. As the fight reaches a tie, Kazuma realizes the truth and breaks free from Unkei. Kazuma tries to reach the plane taking all native Alter users but is stopped by Ryuho.
| 9 | "Shell Bullet"; Transliteration: "Sheru Buritto" (Japanese: シェル・ブリット) | Kazuo Yamazaki | Rion Kujō | August 29, 2001 | July 24, 2005 | |
Realizing he still lacks powers to defeat HOLY, Kazuma goes to the Alter Forest, a place within the Lost Ground filled with animals that contain powers, remembering that Cougar once told him it was the source of Alter. After managing to avoid hurting the animals, Kazuma encounters the same Alter who killed Ryuho's mother and dog. The two start fighting with Kazuma being overpowered. After impaling his enemy, Kazuma receives a new power from the Alter and leaves the forest.
| 10 | "Super Pinch"; Transliteration: "Sūpā Pinchi" (Japanese: スーパー・ピンチ) | Fuyu Kuroki | Shigeki Takagi | September 5, 2001 | July 31, 2005 | |
Kazuma once again leaves the farm to search for HOLY members. He and Kimishima find one named Emergy Maxfel who is giving children toys. When Maxfel plays a joke on Kazuma and Kimishima that there were bombs in the toys, Kazuma starts beating him up. As Kazuma's regular attacks do not affect him, Maxfel reveals his own Alter after being pushed to the edge of a cliff. Unable to defeat Maxfel's giant robot, Kazuma unleashes his new powers, now named Shell Bullet, to defeat Maxfel who now falls from the cliff. Meanwhile, Mimori learns what will happen to the native Alter captured by HOLY and is taken hostage by Zigmar.
| 11 | "Alters"; Transliteration: "Arutāzu" (Japanese: アルターズ) | Tsuyoshi Yoshimoto | Tsuyoshi Yoshimoto | September 12, 2001 | August 7, 2005 | |
Imprisoned, Mimori decides to write information about the history of the Lost Ground. She recounts an earthquake known as the "Great Uprising" which separated the Lost Ground from the Mainland. From that time, it is where the Alters originated. Meanwhile, Zigmar reveals his interest to get Kazuma after seeing his Shell Bullet. Cougar frees Mimori whereas Kanami starts having dreams where she is Kazuma. Kazuma wakes up from his fight against Maxfel after two days. As Kazuma and Kimishima return to the farm, they find it destroyed.
| 12 | "Kunihiko Kimishima"; Transliteration: "Kimishima Kunihiko" (Japanese: 君島邦彦) | Sumio Watanabe | Hirokazu Yamada | September 19, 2001 | August 14, 2005 | |
Kazuma and Kimishima learn that the civilians have been taken by HOLY forces. As the Dars group of HOLY arrives, he tells Kimishima to go find Kanami while he holds them off. HOLY uses Kazuma's image to paint him as a criminal attacking the Lost Ground much to the surprise of everyone. Kimishima finds Kanami, who has learned of Kazuma's Alter when seeing the news. He then convinces the civilians that Kazuma is being used by the city as a decoy, allowing him and Kanami to escape. He hides Kanami and drives to where Kazuma is fighting. Kimishima then aids his friend to defeat the HOLY soldier. However, upon taking Kimishima back to Kanami, Kazuma realizes Kimishima has died from injuries sustained from HOLY.
| 13 | "The Lost Ground"; Transliteration: "Rosuto Guraundo" (Japanese: ロストグラウンド) | Masamitsu Hidaka | Hiroto Katō | September 26, 2001 | August 21, 2005 | |
While remembering how he met Kimishima, Kazuma goes on a vengeful rampage against HOLY soldiers. After defeating Scheris, he learns from her communicator that Ryuho has found Kanami. As a result, Kazuma goes to confront Ryuho before he attacks her. The two of them start fighting once again with Kazuma forcing Ryuho to use Zetsuei's true form. As Ryuho prepares to finish Kazuma, Kazuma takes Kimishima's gun to transform it into the Shell Bullet. However Kazuma is unable to control it, causing a large earthquake that teleports him and Ryuho to a void. Upon seeing the Alter who killed his mother, Ryuho loses all control and clashes with Kazuma, creating the Second Great Uprising.
| 14 | "Kyouji Mujo"; Transliteration: "Mujō Kyōji" (Japanese: 無常矜持) | Masaki Kitamura, Gorō Taniguchi | Rion Kujō | October 3, 2001 | September 18, 2005 | |
Eight months after Kazuma and Ryuho's last fight, both of the fighters have disappeared. Tachibana, Scheris and Mimori search for Ryuho, while Kanami looks for Kazuma but becomes a slave. Back on the Mainland, a man known as Kyouji Mujo reveals to Zigmar he has reinforced HOLY with the users who have been captured in the previous months. Back in the Lost Ground, Kanami tries to save a woman from being beaten up by the strict soldiers but is saved by Ryuho who is suffering amnesia. Disliking the way villagers have been treated, Ryuho manages to bring down their captors, but is unable to remember himself nor Kazuma. Elsewhere, Cougar gives Tachibana and Mimori information about an Alter user, who is revealed to be Kazuma in an underground area.
| 15 | "Rogue"; Transliteration: "Haguremono" (Japanese: はぐれ者) | Fuyu Kuroki | Taiki Nishimura | October 10, 2001 | September 25, 2005 | |
Tachibana and Mimori watch as Kazuma easily defeats his opponent in the arena. In the new village, Ryuho befriends the people having given them freedom. Additionally, he connects with Kanami who constanstly asks him if he remembers Kazuma. Back in the arena, Kazuma rebukes Mimori and Tachibana's questions about Ryuho or Kanami, and decides leave. He gives all the money he won to a child who has been mistreated by the others, but still fears Kanami will die due to their connections in the same way as a Kimishima. HOLY gets closer to the new village but Scheris is confronted by Ryuho as an enemy.
| 16 | "So Kigetsuki"; Transliteration: "Kigetsuki Sō" (Japanese: 来夏月爽) | Tsuyoshi Yoshimoto | Tsuyoshi Yoshimoto | October 17, 2001 | October 2, 2005 | |
As Ryuho learns from Scheris he is also a HOLY, he requests them to leave him in the town. While Scheris agrees to it, Unkei and his partner So Kigetsuki want to bring him back. By using his Mad Script, Unkei tries to rewrite Ryuho's memories replacing Mimori with three women created by Kigetsuki who are to become his bride. Kanami notices none of the three women are human and forces Ryuho to leave. In the afternoon, one of Kigetsuki's artificial woman captures Kanami so that he has another shot at Ryuho. However, when Ryuho displays his power of "the Other Side", he has an illusion of Kazuma and recovers his memories. While Kigetsuki escapes, Unkei hides within his own script. Back near the Mainland, Kazuma is confronted by his former ally Ayase.
| 17 | "Ayase Terada"; Transliteration: "Terada Ayase" (Japanese: 寺田あやせ) | Masamitsu Hidaka | Akira Yoshimura | October 24, 2001 | October 9, 2005 | |
Kazuma is attacked by both Ayase and Biff whose Alters have been enhanced by HOLY. Kazuma escapes to a cave where Ayase follows him, and apologizes for attacking him. She explains that she accepted to work for HOLY as her sick younger brother Akira are treated by their doctor and hopes Kazuma will use his newfound powers to bring salvation to the Lost Ground. However Kazuma refuses, unwilling to subject others to the side effects of Shell Bullet. As Ayase decides to end Kazuma's life, Kimishima's spirit snaps him out accepting his fate. However, Ayase's brother dies, causing Ayase to lose the will to live. Kazuma then briefly faces Mujo who reveals he is the one behind Ayase's and other Alter's enhancements and plans to obtain more Alter powers from the Other Side.
| 18 | "Straight Cougar"; Transliteration: "Sutoreito Kūgā" (Japanese: ストレイト・クーガー) | Gorō Taniguchi | Hiroto Katō | October 31, 2001 | October 16, 2005 | |
Upon seeing the ray of light created when Kazuma and Mujo fought, Kanami goes to see Kazuma. Ryuho decides to accompany her with Scheris telling him she will protect the village instead. Meanwhile, Cougar sends a message to Mimori that he found the village where Ryuho has been living. Both her and Tachibana go to find him but are stopped by Biff. Before Tachibana is about to be defeated by his opponent, Ryuho takes him down. With joy that Ryuho is alive, Mimori tearfully reunites with him. Elsewhere, Kazuma confronts Cougar who reveals to him Kanami's whereabouts, and motivates him to recover his ideals.
| 19 | "The Three Tokonatsu Sisters"; Transliteration: "Tokonatsu San Shimai" (Japanese: 常夏3姉妹) | Tomomi Mochizuki | Masato Miyoshi | November 7, 2001 | October 23, 2005 | |
Scheris is attacked by Kigetsuki's "Tokonatsu Sisters" who have been reaching for Ryuho. Concerned for the villagers, Ryuho's group head back to the village. There they find the villagers captured bend to Kigetsuki's will. Ryuho tries to resist, but he is outnumbered by the HOLY forces. Kazuma and Cougar reach the village with the former defeating Biff in a single strike. With this, Ryuho and the others begin to fight. Kigetsuki combines his three "Sisters" into a giant creature but Kazuma destroys it. Kanami embraces Kazuma in happiness as the two reunite. Elsewhere, Mujo decides to target Kanami and her now revealed psychic Alter powers.
| 20 | "Kanami Yuta"; Transliteration: "Yuta Kanami" (Japanese: 由詫かなみ) | Fuyu Kuroki | Tōru Kitahata | November 14, 2001 | October 30, 2005 | |
Kanami remembers the first time she met Kazuma. Moving to the present as the two are having a picnic, Kanami asks Kazuma not to fight Ryuho, but Kazuma says it's unlikely they won't. Meanwhile, Cougar reveals to the others Mujo plans to obtain the power of the Other Side, a dimension that only Kazuma and Ryuho can open with their powers. However, by overusing the Other Side, an Alter user might die. After leaving them, Ryuho and Kazuma argue but before they can fight they are interrupted by Biff. He appears in the village to kidnap Kanami but neither Kazuma or Ryuho can stop him from escaping with Kanami.
| 21 | "HOLY EYE"; Transliteration: "Hōrī Ai" (Japanese: ホーリー・アイ) | Tsuyoshi Yoshimoto | Tsuyoshi Yoshimoto | November 21, 2001 | November 6, 2005 | |
Kazuma and Ryuho go to save Kanami alone but are both stopped by Cougar. Meanwhile, Tachibana, Mimori and Scheris treat the wounded villagers. Later, Ryuho and Mimori remember their past which brings joy to both of them while Cougar and Scheris give up on their romantic interests. Mujo then sends a missile from a HOLY's satellite to communicate with Kazuma and the others. He reveals he was going to use Ryuho's father as a hostage but he instead committed suicide to avoid troubling his son. Mujo then sends an attack from the satellite but both Kazuma and Ryuho's powers manage to stop them. This opens the Other Side and Mujo absorbs the black Alter user, altering the city with his powers to his own will. After destroying the satellite, both Kazuma and Ryuho reach the city to rescue Kanami and defeat Mujo.
| 22 | "Martin Zigmarl"; Transliteration: "Mātin Jigumāru" (Japanese: マーティン・ジグマール) | Masaki Kitamura, Naoyuki Yoshinaga | Akira Yoshimura | November 28, 2001 | November 13, 2005 | |
Both Kazuma and Ryuho split while entering HOLY. While Kazuma faces all the former native Alter users, Ryuho is confronted by his former commander, Zigmar. Zigmar reveals his Alter which easily overpowers Zetsuei. Disappointed with his power, Zigmar tells Ryuho that his Alter powers caused of the death of his mother when he opened the Other Side seven year ago. Enraged, Ryuho opens the Other Side and creates an armor-like version of Zetsuei which he uses to defeat Zigmarl. Urisane and Elian find Ryuho alongside a severely-aged Zigmar who apologizes to Ryuho for what he told him during the fight as he wanted to make Ryuho reveal his full power. He then dies leaving his son Elian hoping he could live a normal life. Meanwhile, Kazuma's enemies fall from a cliff and perish.
| 23 | "Scheris Adjani"; Transliteration: "Sherisu Ajāni" (Japanese: シェリス・アジャーニ) | Rion Kujō | Rion Kujō | December 5, 2001 | November 20, 2005 | |
Having taken Mimori and Scheris to Mujo's area, Cougar is confronted by Mujo. Despite Cougar's efforts, he is defeated and has his Alter absorbed. Mimori finds Urisane and Elian and tells them she has located an area where Mujo has control of his fortress' weapons. With help from them, Kazuma and Scheris' enemies disappear. However, Ryuho is confronted by the Alter user from the Other Side and is impaled. Scheris reaches Ryuho but finds him dead. She then decides to use the full extent of her Alter powers to revive Ryuho at the cost of her life. When Ryuho wakes up, he realizes Scheris died for him and Kazuma tells him to at least cry for her.
| 24 | "Fist"; Transliteration: "Kobushi" (Japanese: 拳) | Mitsuko Kase, Masamitsu Hidaka | Hiroto Katō | December 12, 2001 | November 27, 2005 | |
Kazuma and Ryuho reach Mujo as well as the Other Side's Alter user. While Kazuma deals with Mujo, Ryuho engages the black Alter. While Mujo has the upper hand over him at first, Kazuma starts taking power from the Other Side to create another Shell Bullet on his other arm and armor on his legs. Their fight is interrupted by Cougar who uses the rest of his powers to rescue Kanami and the two other psychic Alter users. Kazuma then creates his own full-body Alter and easily defeats Mujo. Meanwhile, Ryuho also uses Zetsuei's armor form to defeat his nemesis and sends it back to the Other Side. Mujo returns in a monstrous form, but Kazuma ends him once and for all with his Proud Fist.
| 25 | "Native"; Transliteration: "Neitibu" (Japanese: ネイティブ) | Fuyu Kuroki | Tōru Kitahata | December 19, 2001 | December 4, 2005 | |
After Tachibana saves Kazuma and Ryuho from the disappearing Alter tower, the Mainland starts sending forces to the Lost Ground. However, they are defeated by Kazuma and Ryuho. Later, Ryuho finds Mimori and tells her to return to a safe area. Mimori confesses her love to Ryuho but he feels conflicted due to Scheris' death and leaves. In a farm, Kazuma visits Kanami briefly but she realizes he is going to have a serious fight by reading his mind. Kanami confesses her love to Kazuma who tells her he will return. Kazuma and Ryuho then reunite to face the Mainlands' forces. Three months later, as the Mainlands appear to have withdrawn, Kazuma and Ryuho resolve their rivalry with one final fight.
| 26 | "Dream"; Transliteration: "Yume" (Japanese: 夢) | Gorō Taniguchi | Tsuyoshi Yoshimoto | December 26, 2001 | December 11, 2005 | |
Kazuma and Ryuho start fighting, each escalating the fight with their subsequent Alter forms. Kanami and Mimori find them, but the former tells the latter the two have a strong reason for this fight. Their fight escalates into the upper atmosphere with their final forms, clashing in one massive explosion. They continue to battle, stripping their armor until they are down to their bare fists. Drawing on the last of their reserves, they clash one last time and collapse. As the dust clears, a single hand is raised and forms a fist. In the epilogue, an older Kanami awaits Kazuma's and Ryuho's return, while the two continue to protect the Lost Ground from the Mainland forces.

== Home media ==
| Name | Date | Discs | Episodes |
|---|---|---|---|
| Volume 1 | November 25, 2001 | 1 | 1–2 |
| Volume 2 | December 21, 2001 | 1 | 3–5 |
| Volume 3 | January 25, 2002 | 1 | 6–8 |
| Volume 4 | February 25, 2002 | 1 | 9–11 |
| Volume 5 | March 25, 2002 | 1 | 12–14 |
| Volume 6 | April 25, 2002 | 1 | 15–17 |
| Volume 7 | May 25, 2002 | 1 | 18–20 |
| Volume 8 | June 25, 2002 | 1 | 21–23 |
| Volume 9 | July 25, 2002 | 1 | 24–26 |
