= The Brave Police J-Decker =

Japanese anime television series

- 勇者警察ジェイデッカー
- Genre: Adventure, Mecha, Science Fiction, Action
- Created by: Hajime Yatate
- Developed by: Hiroyuki Kawasaki
- Directed by: Shinji Takamatsu
- Music by: Yasunori Iwasaki
- Country of origin: Japan
- Original language: Japanese
- No. of episodes: 48

Production
- Producers: Hitoshi Kako (Nagoya TV); Asahi Obara (Tokyu Agency); Fumikuni Furuzawa (Sunrise)
- Production companies: Nagoya TV; Tokyu Agency; Sunrise

Original release
- Network: ANN (Nagoya TV, TV Asahi)
- Release: February 5, 1994 – January 28, 1995

The Brave Police J-Decker (勇者警察ジェイデッカー, Yūsha Keisatsu Jeidekkā) is the fifth series of the anime television meta Brave series (Yūsha) created by Sunrise. It aired in Japan from February 5, 1994, to January 28, 1995. Brave Police J-Decker returns the series to a subtly lighter tone, focusing more on the concept of "robot as human-built AI construct" emphasized by the previous season's series, The Brave Express Might Gaine. The series takes place in the fictional city of Nanamagari City.

== Characters ==
Yuta Tomonaga (友永 勇太, Tomonaga Yuuta)
(Voiced by Hiromi Ishikawa)
A 10-year-old boy in fourth grade who stumbles upon Deckerd, a humanoid robot under construction by the Japanese police, built to fight advanced forms of crime. Yuta's constant contact with Deckerd gives the robot a "heart", or personality; when Yuta is recruited as the "boss" of the "Brave Police" (ブレイブポリス, Bureibu Porisu) as a result, a true human/robot partnership occurs. While he's quite prone to tears, he shows that he also has both the kindness and the courage to stand up for other people, or for his team.
Azuki Tomonaga (友永 あずき, Tomonaga Azuki)
(Voiced by Michiko Neya)
The eldest of Yuta's sisters, 16-year-old Azuki takes care of the house instead of their absentee parents. She is in love with Masaya Kashiwazaki.
Kurumi Tomonaga (友永 くるみ, Tomonaga Kurumi)
(Voiced by Mika Yanata)
The middle child of the Tomonaga family and Yuta's second oldest sister, at age 13. She's a tomboyish, impatient, hotblooded girl.
Juzo Saejima (冴島 十三, Saejima Jūzō)
(Voiced by Ryuzaburo Otomo)
Metropolitan Police Department Superintendent General. He conceived Brave Police and appointed Yuta to Police inspector.
Shunsuke Todo (藤堂 俊助, Tōdō Shunsuke)
(Voiced by Masaaki Tsukada)
The development designer of Brave Police in Japan. He is not only a skilled mechanic, but has a genuine interest and love for the machines.
Kazuto Azuma (東 一門, Azuma Kazuto)
(Voiced by Kazuo Oka)
Metropolitan Police Department vice-inspector-general. He is a respectable, straitlaced person.
Regina Argine (レジーナ・アルジーン, Rejīna Arujīn)
(Voiced by Yuko Miyamura)
Brave Police development chief of Scotland Yard. With the duke whom she made came over to Japan. She has a doctorate of the Cambridge University mechanical engineering despite being 12 years old. Due to her dark past, including her father refusing to arrest her mother for a crime, thus failing on his duty as policeman, she resolves to be a "perfect" policeman; one that will not be swayed by "evil" emotions. Believing that all emotions, including friendship, caring and love, would be evil. Believe she had failed with Duke, she tried to have Deckard be "perfect", but Deckerd's friendship with Yuta, changed her mind. After almost losing Duke, she saw the errors of her ways, and began to show more emotions. She designed and created Duke, and Duke always refers her as "Lady". She would also help to develop a British version of the Brave Police to combat crime.
Ayako Kimizuka (君塚 綾子, Kimizuka Ayako)
(Voiced by Takumi Kurebayashi)
A cheerful journalist and photographer. She has a strong relationship with the Build Team's Dumpson, and may be in love with him.
Seia Onoue (尾上 せいあ, Onoue Seia)
(Voiced by Etsuko Ishikawa)
A high-ranking officer of the military Defense Forces. She bonds with the Build Team's McCrane, especially after he saved her brother Makoto, and it's strongly implied that they're in love with one another despite him being a robot.
Daisaku Omura (大村 大作, Ōmura Daisaku)
(Voiced by Mitsuaki Hoshino)
Sanae Itohata (糸畑 さなえ, Itohata Sanae)
(Voiced by Takumi Kurebayashi)
Masaya Kashiwazaki (柏崎 雅也, Kashiwazaki Masaya)
(Voiced by Takumi Yamazaki)
Mudra (ムドラー, Mudoraa)
(Voiced by Ryotaro Okiayu)
Yuichiro Tomonaga (友永 勇一郎, Tomonaga Yuuichirou)
(Voiced by Ken Shiroyama)
He is Yuta's father.
Amami Tomonaga (友永 亜真美, Tomonaga Amami)
(Voiced by Naoko Ishii)
She is Yuta's mother.
Makoto Onoue (尾上 真琴, Onoue Makoto)
(Voiced by Akifumi Endo)
He is Seia Onoue's younger brother.
Masaki Kitagawa (喜多川 勝気, Kitagawa Masaki)
(Voiced by Takumi Kurebayashi)
Kikumaro Takano (鷹野 菊麿, Takano Kikumaro)
(Voiced by Michiko Neya)
Emiri Aihara (愛原 絵美里, Aihara Emiri)
(Voiced by Mika Yanata)

== Offenders ==
Ken Shinjo (新庄 健, Shinjou Ken)
An ex-police engineer with Cystic Fibrosis. He founded Excellent Inc. and stole Kagero's AI to taint with his personality traits. (Voiced by Kazuyuki Sogabe)
Victim O'Rand (ビクティム・オーランド, Bikutimu Oorando)
He was a scientist killed by Tony Crusader. An android was built with an evil version of his personality who built the Chieftain robots, was destroyed and rebuilt as a super robot, and turned good. (Voiced by Takehito Koyasu)
Neuva Fahrzeug (ノイバー・フォルツォイク, Noibā Forutsoiku)
(Voiced by Nobuo Tobita)
He is Eva's son who infiltrated Excellent corporation under the name "Tony Crusader" and killed Victim.
Eva Fahrzeug (エヴァ・フォルツォイク, Eva Forutsoiku)
(Voiced by Miki Ito)
She is Neuva's mother who invented an artificially intelligent computer, but was cryogenically imprisoned for experimenting on humans to make a better one.

== Brave Police ==
=== J-Decker Team ===
- Fire J-Decker/Fire J-Decker Max Cannon Mode (ファイヤージェイデッカー/ファイヤージェイデッカー・マックスキャノンモード, Faiyāaa Jeidekkā/Faiyā Jeidekkā Makkusu kyanon mōdo) (Voiced by Tōru Furusawa): The Great Combiner of the Brave Police, the powered-up form of J-Decker, with Duke Fire as the additional parts. He can also combine with Gun-Max Armor to form Fire J-Decker Max Cannon Mode.
  - J-Decker/J-Decker Max Cannon Mode (ジェイデッカー/ジェイデッカー・マックスキャノンモード, Jeidekkā/Jeidekkā Makkusu kyanon mōdo) (Voiced by Tōru Furusawa): Super robot combination of Deckerd and J-Roader. This is the leading main robot of the series. He can also combine with Gun-Max Armor to form J-Decker Max Cannon Mode.
    - Deckerd (デッカード, Dekkādo) (Voiced by Tōru Furusawa): The sentient police robot that transforms into a police car based on Chevrolet Corvette (C4). He is the primary leading robot of the story and is the first robot of the Brave Police. All Brave Police robots' Super A.I. are originated from him. He acts as the leader of the team and he is usually a peace-maker when conflict arises among Brave Team. He is the only one from the team that refers Yuta as "Yuta" rather than "Boss". He forms the head and the chest of J-Decker. After being killed by the Chieftain's, Deckerd was temporary taken control of by Gaizonite, and turned into Satan J-Decker. The other's were able to get him back and put his Super A.I. into a new body, but he lost all of his memories. He was, however, able to get them back.
    - J-Roader (ジェイローダー, Jeirōdā): A massive SWAT truck based on Kenworth L700. It has a garage located in the rear in which to transport Deckerd in car mode. It forms the body of J-Decker.
    - Gun-Max Armor (ガンマックスアーマー, Ganmakkusu Āmā) (Voiced by Naoki Makishima): The combined robot form of Gun-Max and his Gun Bike. He can also transform into Max Cannon as a weapon for J-Decker or Fire J-Decker.
      - Gun-Max (ガンマックス, Ganmakkusu) (Voiced by Naoki Makishima): A sentient police robot that does not transform on his own. He is from Traffic Patrol Division. As a quite independent robot, he refuses to work with Yuta in the beginning. However, when Yuta almost sacrificed himself to save him, he is touched by Yuta's genuine love and join the team. He often uses English when he talks, and is one of the most care-free character of the story. Time to time, he refers Yuta as "kid" and he has a special relationship with Todo, the development director of the Brave Police.
      - Gun Bike (ガンバイク, Ganbaiku): A oversized police motorcycle based on Honda GL1500 Goldwing that is large enough to be ridden by Gun-Max.
  - Duke Fire (デュークファイヤー, Dyūku faiyā) (Voiced by Toshiyuki Morikawa): The secondary main robot of the series, formed from Duke and Fire Roader. He forms the body additions of Fire J-Decker.
    - Duke (デューク, Dyūku) (Voiced by Toshiyuki Morikawa): A sentient robot that transforms into an ambulance based on Toyota Previa (XR10). Created by Regina, he was instructed to have perfect AI, not swayed by emotions and evil thoughts. However, as he spends more time with other members, he realizes that traits once Regina called evil, such as anger, hatred, are not always necessarily evil. He wanted to be Regina's "perfect" policeman just to see her smile again. As one of the most serious robots of the Brave Police, he does not talk much, speaks only if necessary. He always calls Regina as "Lady" rather than her real name. Only time he ever called Regina by her first name was when Regina was about to be attacked by Satan J-Decker (under the control of Gaizonite) as he managed to get all strength to unite to save Regina from the attack. He forms the arms of Duke Fire. When J-Decker was taken control by Gaizonite, Duke temporally became the new leader of the Brave Police. After Deckerd regained his memories, Duke became his second-in-command.
    - Fire Roader (ファイヤーローダー, Faiyā Rōdā): A massive tractor-drawn ladder fire engine that serves as Duke's support vehicle. It forms the torso, legs and head of Duke Fire.

=== Build Team ===
- Super Build Tiger/Tiger Gimlet (スーパービルドタイガー / タイガーギムレット, Sūpā Birudo Taigā) (Voiced by Ryōtarō Okiayu): The combined forms of the full Build Team, the powered-up form of Build Tiger with Drill Boy as the additional parts. The Tiger Gimlet is an elongated assault vehicle with a front-mounted drill.
  - Build Tiger (ビルドタイガー, Birudo Taigā) (Voiced by Ryōtarō Okiayu): The combined forms of the first three Build Team members. The Build team originally did not start with Super A.I. as there was still a debate among the police force, as the police force did not buy the idea of Super A.I. After seeing the difference between the robot with super A.I (in this case Deckerd) and the robots without it (the Build Team), the police force decided to give super A.I. to the Build Team.
    - McCrane (マクレーン, Makurēn) (Voiced by Ryōtarō Okiayu): Leader of the Build Team that transforms into a hydraulic mobile crane. He is one of the most reserved members and has a close relationship with Seia, the chief of the Defense Force, and might be in love with her. When forming Build Tiger or Super Build Tiger, McCrane forms the head, torso and right arm.
    - Power Joe (パワージョー, Pawā Jō) (Voiced by Takumi Yamazaki): Member of the Build Team that transforms into a Hitachi UH07 excavator. His hot tempered personality often leads to quarrel in the team, especially with Drill Boy. He is close to Yuta's three friends, Masaki, Emily, and Kigumaro. He often wields nunchaku or Karate stick, a two section staff and is a fan of Kungfu. He often uses Kung Fu moves when engaged in a fight. When forming Build Tiger or Super Build Tiger, Power Joe forms the left arm.
    - Dumpson (ダンプソン, Danpuson) (Voiced by Mitsuaki Hoshino): Member of the Build Team that transforms into a Mitsubishi D320 offroad dump truck. He has a close relationship with Ayako, a field reporter, which may have romantic roots. He has a fighting style of a wrestler, and like Power Joe, he shows his temper time to time. He uses his dumbbells in a fight. When forming Build Tiger or Super Build Tiger, Dumpson forms the legs.
  - Drillboy (ドリルボーイ, Doriru Bōi) (Voiced by Hiro Yūki): The additional member of the Build Team and a soccer player that transforms into a drill tank or drill jet. As the youngest member in Brave team, he has the mentality of a teenager and tends to acts childishly, which gets him scolded by Yuta or his teammates. He is a prankster, and loves to joke around. His main weapon is his soccer ball, which turns into spiked soccer ball when used against enemies. When forming Super Build Tiger, Drillboy becomes the foot additions, torso addition and wings.

=== BP-500 Ninja-type Series ===
- Shadow-Maru (シャドウ丸, Shadomaru) (Voiced by Fumihiko Tachiki): A large ninja robot that transforms into a kind of police car, an artillery tank, a jet, or a giant German shepherd. He can also transform into the Brave Cannon (ブレイブキャノン, Bureibu Kyanon), a massive gun that is supported by J-Decker, Duke Fire, Gun-Max Armor, and Super Build Tiger in a team attack. Shadow-Maru is a remolded and recolored version of Sixshot from the Transformers. Unlike other members, he is equipped with many difference sensors, he is able to detect things that other members cannot. He usually does all the research and detective work as he is an expert in that area. He is the only member of the team that does not unify with other members. He is the brother of Kagero and has personal history with Kagero. He was forced to kill Kagero in tears after Kagero became mindless killing machine as his A.I. was already taken by Shinjo, a villain of the series. He wished to die with Kagero after he revenged Kagero, but with the wish of Kagero, he became official member of the Brave Police.
- Kagero (カゲロウ, Kagerou) (Voiced by Shigeru Nakahara): The prototype and brother of Shadow-Maru. He is a large ninja robot of appearance similar to Shadow Maru, and transforms into a car mode and a Rodan-like draconic mode. He went renegade when he discovered that his A.I was to be deleted after testing. So, he fights against the Brave Police, who are assigned with the task of capturing him, and later killed by the hands of his brother Shadow-Maru. He is caught by Shinjo and his AI taken to be installed in a submarine, which sinks. His AI is later used by Excellent Inc., a company that main antagonist Nueva runs, to build enemy robots with Super AI Victim and his Chieftain series use the AI that was stolen from Kagero.

=== English Brave Police ===
- Unveiled in Episode 41 by Regina, the British Brave Police are 4 transforming robots with Super A.I. units installed. They were physically re-deco's of the Divers from the previous Brave series; Might Gaine. Although not mentioned on the show; each robot was supposed to have one of the first names of the four members of the 1960s British rock group The Beatles; John (ジョン Jon), Paul (ポール Pōru), George (ジョージ Jōji) and Ringo (リンゴ Ringo). They later re-appear briefly in episode 46, where Duke revealed at least two of their names to be Rook (ルーク Rūku) and Bishop (ビショップ Bishoppu) (Their names likely inspired by chess pieces) before they destroy each other under the control of the Hamlen waves.

== Unlawful Monsters ==
The many organic and robotic monsters that appear throughout the series that the Brave Police fought.

- Death Magnet: Appears in episode 1. Powers include magnetic beams from the main coil in torso, flight, and a stealth system. It was constructed and piloted by Doktor Gauss. Reappears in Brave Saga with the hip funnels being used as small laser cannons.
- Barbarossa: Appears in episode 2. Powers include flight, twin machine guns, and summoning flight battler units armed with a machine gun and missiles. It is actually a living aerial bomber commanded by sorcerer Noriyasu Cato (a parody of the popular fictional character Yasunori Kato)
- Gaizonite: Appears in episodes 3 and 26. Powers include traveling to planets in a meteor, a silicate body, red lightning bolts from the antennae that can control inorganic matter although strong willed robots can resist it, and levitation.
  - Dastogon: Appears in episode 3. Its only known power is a drill for the right arm.
- Screwdriver: Appears in episode 4. Powers include burrowing, sharp claws for fingers, and high jumping. It is a human sized assassin robot used by Monsieur Monde.
- Black Russian: Appears in episode 4. Powers include breaking its body into pieces and an electric grapple claw in the torso. It is a robot piloted by Monsieur Monde. The design resembles Mazinger Z and Steel Jeeg.
- Gawan: Appears in episode 5. Powers include a long tongue, a whip tail, and adaptive armor.
- Pierorobo: Appears in episode 6. Powers include retractable limbs, a drill in the left index finger, and rotating machine guns in the waist. It is piloted by clown partner bio-scientists Donik and his assistant Pierrot.
- Bronze Kong: Appears in episode 9. Powers include a bio-bronze body that allows it to divide into statues, absorb physical blows, and regenerate. It was constructed by art thief Wakabayashi Nobio.
- Abyss Guards: Appear in episode 11. Powers include a chained Kama, a shield on either arm, and a laser gun in the left arm. They serve as the guards of the advanced submarine Abyss created by Dr. Ken Shinjo. Reappear in Brave Saga.
- Cabalientro Brelicatodomes: Appears in episode 12. Powers include a larval form with high jumping, a thick exoskeleton, growth by eating, adolescent form armed with sharp claws, and in its adult form butterfly wings with acidic scales and adhesive black gas from its two tails and mouth.
- Crimson X Workbots: Appear in episode 13. Their only known power is an enhanced engine that causes them to explode after being used for too long; the second one also has drills for hands. They were originally regular work bots before being stolen by Yoshiki, Yoshito, and Yoshiva Kikaida and given a Crimson-X System.
  - Death Metal: Appears in episode 13. Powers include laser absorbing shoulder plates and a pair of combinable lances. It is the completed version of the Crimson-X System used and piloted by Yoshiki, Yoshito, and Yoshiva Kikaida. It heavily resembles the replica Auge from Heavy Metal L-Gaim.
- Robotic Cockroach: Appears in episode 14. Powers include burrowing and green electric bolts from the antennae. It is one of three robotic insects created by Dr. Eric Von Gigastein III.
- Robotic Beetle: Appears in episode 14. Powers include burrowing, a large horn, tank treads in the thorax, and pink eye lasers. It is one of three robotic insects created by Dr. Eric Von Gigastein III.
- Robotic Mantis: Appear in episodes 14 and 15. Powers include burrowing, a rapid fire grenade launcher and pink energy blasts from the mouth, and green electric bolts from the antennae. They one of three robotic insects created by Dr. Eric Von Gigastein III with one assisting the other two robotic insects and one guarding his castle in Germany.
- Gigazector: Appears in episode 15. Powers include four arms, electric bolts from the eyes, sound waves that control insect men of the Underground Kingdom, a statue disguise, a flamethrower in the mouth, and a 3-tube energy cannon in each pectoral. It is a combination of human and insect man technology created and piloted by Dr. Eric Von Gigastein III. It heavily resembles aura battlers from Aura Battler Dunbine.
- Big Steel Soldier Demars: Appears in episode 16. Powers include burrowing, eight firework cannons on the torso, flight, bullas from the torso, finger missiles, emitting a holograms of itself, and a flamethrower in the abdomen. It is controlled by Lieyer The Thief's unnamed son.
- Inti: Appears in episode 17. Powers include possession to drag out human greed, levitation, phasing through matter, pink eye beams that cause possession and small explosions, and a stone body. She is an ancient Mayan evil spirit from Machu Picchu that will lose energy if she sees her reflection.
- Growth Serum Cockroach: Appears in episode 18. Possesses no known powers as it is quickly killed by Shadow-Maru before attacking a scientist.
- Growth Serum Panda: Appears in episode 18. Powers include swimming long distances and sharp claws. Reappears in Brave Saga 2.
- Doublebots: Appear in episode 19. Powers include spear legs, pincer claws, and wires that emit electric shocks. They are modified junk cars controlled by Bob Marey.
- Bycross: Appears in episode 21. Powers include a machine gun while dividing into motorcycles, drill fingers, and cyclone lightning blasts from the palms. It is driven by former Highway Patrol officer Kirisak.
- Bullfighter Robo: Appears in episode 22. Powers include speed and bull horns. It is a centaur-like robot piloted by master of disguise and masked wrestler crime lord Mil Amigo.
- Gyrobot: Appears in episode 23. Powers include flight, a pair of machine guns in the torso, finger machine guns, and a laser cannon in each arm. It is piloted by Dr. Adolf Madoh.
- Chieftain Twins (チーフテン, Chiifuten) (Voiced by Ginzo Matsuo): Appear in episodes 25 and 26. Powers include jet boosters on the back that grant flight and swimming, a katana that fires lightning bolts, and a beam absorbing force field by combining. They have Super A.I. based on the cyborg duplicate of Victim O'Rand commanded by Neuva Fahrzeug with them originally being produced by the Excellent Company.
- Tank Combined Robo: Appears in episode 26. Its only known power is having seven tank cannons on each side of its body. It was constructed from Special Police Units merged from Gaizonite.
- Satan J-Decker (サタンジェイデッカー, Satan Jeidekkaa): Appears in episodes 26 and 27. Powers include swimming, j-buster, flight, a laser cannon on each foot, and a beam javelin. In Brave Saga 2 his origin is redone from being possessed by Gaizonite to becoming zondarized by Primada from GaoGaiGar.
- Remodeled Chieftain 1 (Voiced by Ginzo Matsuo): Appears in episodes 26 and 27. Powers include a machine controlling sword named Dan based on Gaizonite, emitting an electromagnetic pulse from Dan, and a long range armored Tazer for the right arm. After being defeated, Dan fled the battle and served as Victim's transport in episode 29.
- Mechasaura: Appears in episode 28. Powers include scythe arms, ten energy cannons on the body with an eleventh in the mouth, and concealed missile pods.
- Hyper Chieftain Twins (ハイパーチーフテン, Haipaa Chiifuten) (Voiced by Ginzo Matsuo): Appear in episode 29. Powers include a missile launcher in each pectoral, a saber, lasers from the right wrist, a beam absorbing force field by combining, and a brave up style combination. They were created from data on Remodeled Chieftain 1 after Dan fled and retrieved his head for Victim O'Rand to use.
  - Armored Chieftain (アーマードチーフテン, Aamaado Chiifuten) (Voiced by Ginzo Matsuo): Appears in episode 29. It possesses the combination of both Hyper Chieftains with the first one in controlling the body upon killing the second one and is twice the size. Powers include a beam absorbing chest plate, a double sided saber, armpit missiles, and lasers from the right wrist.
- Psycho Gunner: Appears in episode 31. Powers include separating its body into three pieces, levitation, absorbing psychic energy as fuel, cutting beams from the palms, constricting extendable hair, and throwing psychokinetic energy balls. It is controlled by Esper agent Sister Nanase.
- Wetherd: Appears in episode 32. Powers include levitation, creating magnetic storms from the underside, manipulating weather to create storms, a magnetic force field, and several 12-tube missile launchers around the body.
- Janus: Appears in episode 34. Powers include interference signals, emitting illusions, levitation, and invisibility. It is a crime robot piloted by the game programming Bubble Gun Sisters.
- Armgun: Appear in episode 35. Powers include perfect accuracy with the gun arms, four-wheeled legs, and a highly explosive body. They were created by Dr. Edgar Popkins. They heavily resemble the title mech from Gunhed.
- Biomecha: Appear in episode 36. Powers include agility and sharp claws. They are three bio machines with one being used by bio scientist Kuze.
  - Super Biomecha: Appears in episode 36. Powers include burrowing, an explosive mouth beam, sharp claws, and armored plates that can be shed for agility. It is a bio machine piloted by bio scientist Kuze.
- God Whale: Appears in episode 37. Powers include fast swimming, a narwhal-like horn, can temporarily survive and move on land, and mouth flames by drinking oil. It is a giant cyborg whale created by former marine biologist Shiro Mizushime using thought patterns of his late son Shin.
- Nue: Appears in episode 38. Powers include levitation, an electrical body, and a coiling tail. It is an artificial ghost created by illusionist Magi Demon.
- Trailer Robo: Appears in episode 39. Powers include a remote semi truck armed with a pair of pile drivers, disguising itself as a truck trailer, lasers and machine guns from the palms of its clawed hands, a pair of 13-tube missile pod launchers, and foot treads. It is a car stealing robot created by car dealer Yasuko Ensuuji.
- Minotaur Robo: Appears in episode 42. Powers include burrowing and eye heat laserss.
- Barak Seijin: Appears in episodes 42 and 43. Powers include human disguising, causing objects to melt telepathically, holograms, spawning electrical fields to trap enemies, and summoning Baracron by throwing his capsule. They heavily resembles Alien Metron from Ultraseven while having the laugh of Alien Baltan from the original Ultraman.
  - Baracron: Appears in episodes 42 and 43. Powers include fire balls from the head hole and energy shockwaves from the body. It resembles Zetton from the last episode of Ultraman while his capsule form is an obvious homage to Windom, Miclas, and Agira from Ultraseven.
- Black Chieftains (ブラックチーフテン, Burakku Chiifuten) (Voiced by Ginzo Matsuo): Appears in episodes 44, 45, 46, and 47. Powers include back thrusters granting swimming and flight, super speed, detachable rocket powered hands, self destructing, automatic rifles, and a katana. They are mass production chieftains based on the original two created by the Excellent Company and manufactured in the Turkish city of Etonia. Reappear in Brave Saga with their katanas firing blue laser beams similar to the original twins.
- Mecha Victim (Voiced by Takehito Koyasu): Appears in episodes 45 and 46. Powers include flight, a jousting lance that can be charged with blue fire, and agility. It is a giant robot with the AI of the cyborg duplicate of Victim O'Rand piloted by Neuva Fahrzeug. Reappears in Brave Saga.
- Big Mother (ビッグ・マザー, Biggu Mazaa): Appears in episodes 45, 46, and 47. Powers include flight and Hamlen waves from the mouth that take control of any machine with a Fahrzeugronne Chip.
  - Mad Mother (マッド・マザー, Maddo Mazaa): Appears in episode 47. Powers include disguising itself as a statue, impaling tendrils from the back, a scythe, blade resistant armor, and four energy cannons hidden in the abdomen. It is a command unit of the black chieftains piloted by Eva Fahrzeug. Reappears in Brave Saga.

== Episodes ==
| No. | Title | Directed by | Written by | Original release date |
|---|---|---|---|---|
| 1 | "Robot Detective Appears" "Robotto Keiji Tōjō" (ロボット刑事登場) | Directed by : Naoki Hishikawa; Storyboarded by : Shinji Takamatsu | Hiroyuki Kawasaki | February 5, 1994 |
| 2 | "His Name is J-Decker" "Sononaha Jeidekkā" (その名はジェイデッカー) | Directed by : Yasuhiro Minami; Storyboarded by : Kazuhito Kikuchi | Hiroyuki Kawasaki | February 12, 1994 |
| 3 | "Kind-hearted Friends" "Kokoro aru Nakama-Tachi" (心ある仲間たち) | Shinichi Watanabe | Hiroyuki Kawasaki | February 19, 1994 |
| 4 | "The Boss is a Fourth-Grader" "Bosu wa Shōgaku 4-Nensei" (ボスは小学4年生) | Kunihisa Sugishima | Kenichi Araki | February 26, 1994 |
| 5 | "Artificial Giant Dragon Gawan" "Jinzō Kyoryū Gawan" (人造巨龍ガワン) | Masamitsu Hidaka | Shō Aikawa | March 5, 1994 |
| 6 | "Beware of Trends" "Torendo ni Goyōshin" (トレンドにご用心) | Shinichi Watanabe | Masaharu Amiya | March 12, 1994 |
| 7 | "Great Collapse" "Dai Tōkai" (大倒壊) | Directed by : Yasuhiro Minami; Storyboarded by : Kazuhito Kikuchi | Hiroyuki Kawasaki | March 19, 1994 |
| 8 | "Completed! Build Tiger" "Kansei! Birudotaigā" (完成!ビルドタイガー) | Naoki Hishikawa | Hiroyuki Kawasaki | March 26, 1994 |
| 9 | "The Mystery of the Missing Statue" "Kieta Chōzō no Nazo" (消えた彫像の謎) | Kunihisa Sugishima | Yasunori Yamada | April 2, 1994 |
| 10 | "Shadow Detective" "Kage no Deka" (影の刑事) | Directed by : Naoki Hishikawa; Storyboarded by : Shinji Takamatsu | Shō Aikawa | April 9, 1994 |
| 11 | "Fierce Battle! Shadow-Maru" "Gekitō! Shadōmaru" (激闘!シャドウ丸) | Masamitsu Hidaka | Shō Aikawa | April 16, 1994 |
| 12 | "Ancient Insects Revived" "Yomigaeru Kodai Konchū" (よみがえる古代昆虫) | Shinichi Watanabe | Kenichi Araki | April 23, 1994 |
| 13 | "Chase the Robot Robbers" "Robotto Gōtō-Dan o Oe" (ロボット強盗団を追え) | Kunihisa Sugishima | Kenichi Araki | April 30, 1994 |
| 14 | "The Sixth Member" "6 Hitome no Nakama" (6人目の仲間) | Directed by : Yasuhiro Minami; Storyboarded by : Kazuhito Kikuchi | Hiroyuki Kawasaki | May 7, 1994 |
| 15 | "30,000 Years of Friendship" "3 Man-Nen no Yūjō" (3万年の友情) | Naoki Hishikawa | Hiroyuki Kawasaki | May 14, 1994 |
| 16 | "The Return of the Nemesis" "Kattekita Shukuteki" (帰ってきた宿敵) | Yasuhiro Minami | Yasunori Yamada; Hiroyuki Kawasaki | May 21, 1994 |
| 17 | "Evil God Inti" "Jashin Inti" (邪神インティ) | Masamitsu Hidaka | Shō Aikawa | May 28, 1994 |
| 18 | "Panda Alert!?" "Panda Chūihō!?" (パンダ注意報!?) | Shinichi Watanabe | Masaharu Amiya | June 4, 1994 |
| 19 | "Explosive! Police Motorcycle Detective" "Bakusō! Shirobai Keiji" (爆走!白バイ刑事) | Kunihisa Sugishima | Kenichi Araki | June 11, 1994 |
| 20 | "Crazy Hourglass" "Kurutta Sunadokei" (狂った砂時計) | Directed by : Yasuhiro Minami; Storyboarded by : Kazuhito Kikuchi | Kenichi Araki | June 18, 1994 |
| 21 | "Fugitive in Handcuffs" "Tejō no Tōbō-sha" (手錠の逃亡者) | Naoki Hishikawa | Yasunori Yamada | June 25, 1994 |
| 22 | "Masked Hero Dumpson" "Kamen Yūsha Danpuson" (仮面勇者ダンプソン) | Shinichi Watanabe | Masaharu Amiya | July 2, 1994 |
| 23 | "My Fairy" "Boku no Yōsei (Faerī)" (ぼくの妖精（フェアリー）) | Masamitsu Hidaka | Kenichi Araki | July 9, 1994 |
| 24 | "Seven Detectives" "Shichinin no Keiji" (七人の刑事) | Directed by : Naoki Hishikawa; Storyboarded by : Shinji Takamatsu | Hiroyuki Kawasaki | July 16, 1994 |
| 25 | "Deckerd Dies in the Line of Duty" "Dekkādo Junshoku" (デッカード殉職) | Directed by : Yasuhiro Minami; Storyboarded by : Kazuhito Kikuchi | Hiroyuki Kawasaki | July 23, 1994 |
| 26 | "New Leader" "Atarashi Rīdā" (新しいリーダー) | Kunihisa Sugishima | Shō Aikawa | July 30, 1994 |
| 27 | "Perfect Tears" "Kanpeki na Namida" (完璧な涙) | Naoki Hishikawa | Shō Aikawa | August 6, 1994 |
| 28 | "Deckerd Returns" "Dekkādo Futatabi" (デッカード再び) | Shinichi Watanabe | Kenichi Araki | August 13, 1994 |
| 29 | "Combined! Fire J-Decker" "Gattai! Faiyājeidekkā" (合体!ファイヤージェイデッカー) | Masamitsu Hidaka | Hiroyuki Kawasaki | August 20, 1994 |
| 30 | "Underground City SOS!" "Chika Toshi SOS!" (地下都市SOS!) | Directed by : Yasuhiro Minami; Storyboarded by : Kazuhito Kikuchi | Kenichi Araki | August 27, 1994 |
| 31 | "The Invisible Criminal" "Sugata Naki Hanzai-sha" (姿なき犯罪者) | Kunihisa Sugishima | Hiroyuki Kawasaki | September 10, 1994 |
| 32 | "A Typhoon is Coming!" "Taifū ga Kita!" (台風が来た!) | Naoki Hishikawa | Yasunori Yamada | September 17, 1994 |
| 33 | "Little Hero" "Chiisana Yūsha" (小さな勇者) | Shinichi Watanabe | Masaharu Amiya | September 24, 1994 |
| 34 | "Power Joe's Love" "Pawājō no Koi" (パワージョーの恋) | Masamitsu Hidaka | Shō Aikawa | October 1, 1994 |
| 35 | "Brave Police Power-Up Plan" "Yūsha Keisatsu (Bureibuporisu) Pawāappu Keikaku" (勇者警察（ブレイブポリス）パワーアップ計画) | Directed by : Yasuhiro Minami; Storyboarded by : Kazuhito Kikuchi | Hiroyuki Kawasaki | October 8, 1994 |
| 36 | "Home is Far Away" "Furusato wa Tōku" (故郷は遠く) | Kunihisa Sugishima | Yasunori Yamada | October 15, 1994 |
| 37 | "Whale God Hunt" "Geishin Kari" (鯨神狩り) | Naoki Hishikawa | Shō Aikawa | October 22, 1994 |
| 38 | "It's a Ghost, Everyone Gather Together" "Obake dayo zen'in shūjō" (オバケだよ全員集合) | Shinichi Watanabe | Masaharu Amiya | November 5, 1994 |
| 39 | "Soul of the Machine" "Mashin no Tamashī" (マシンの魂) | Yasuhiro Minami | Katsuhiko Takayama; Hiroyuki Kawasaki | November 12, 1994 |
| 40 | "Brave Police Disbanded!" "Bureibuporisu Kaisan!" (ブレイブポリス解散!) | Masamitsu Hidaka | Kenichi Araki | November 19, 1994 |
| 41 | "Regina Reminiscence" "Rejīna・ Tsuioku" (レジーナ・追憶) | Directed by : Naoki Hishikawa; Storyboarded by : Shinji Takamatsu | Hiroyuki Kawasaki | November 26, 1994 |
| 42 | "Invaders from Space" "Uchū kara no Shinryaku-sha" (宇宙からの侵略者) | Kunihisa Sugishima | Yasunori Yamada | December 3, 1994 |
| 43 | "Shadow Maru Cannon Transformation! Special Attack!! Brave Cannon" "Shadōmaru Taihō Henka (ōzutsu hen-ge)! Hissatsu!! Bureibukyanon" (シャドウ丸大砲変化（おおづつへんげ)! 必殺!!ブレイブキャノン) | Naoki Hishikawa | Yasunori Yamada | December 10, 1994 |
| 44 | "The Stolen Boss!" "Ubawareta Bosu!" (奪われたボス!) | Shinichi Watanabe | Hiroyuki Kawasaki | December 17, 1994 |
| 45 | "Big Mother" "Biggu・Madā" (ビッグ・マザー) | Directed by : Yasuhiro Minami; Storyboarded by : Kazuhito Kikuchi | Hiroyuki Kawasaki | December 24, 1994 |
| 46 | "The Greatest Crime in History" "Shijō Saidai no Hanzai" (史上最大の犯罪) | Kunihisa Sugishima | Hiroyuki Kawasaki | January 7, 1995 |
| 47 | "Heart to Heart" "Hāto to Hāto" (ハートtoハート) | Masamitsu Hidaka | Hiroyuki Kawasaki | January 21, 1995 |
| 48 | "Goodbye Boss" "Sayonara Yūta (Bosu)" (さよなら勇太（ボス)) | Directed by : Naoki Hishikawa; Storyboarded by : Shinji Takamatsu | Hiroyuki Kawasaki | January 28, 1995 |

== Video games ==
J-Decker was adapted in the Brave Saga games like all other Braves entries. It was also adapted into Super Robot Wars 30 for the PlayStation 4, Nintendo Switch and PC, featuring almost every member of the Brave Police as playable characters although Decker, Duke, the Build Team and Gunmax only appear in cutscenes. Kagero and Victim are also secrets.

| Preceded by The Brave Express Might Gaine | Brave series 1994-1995 | Succeeded by The Brave of Gold Goldran |
