= Etsuko Ishikawa =

Japanese actress

- 石川 悦子
- Born: May 22, 1965 (age 60); Tokyo, Japan
- Education: Aoyama Gakuin Women's Junior College
- Occupations: Actress; voice actress
- Years active: 1986-present
- Agent: Theatre Echo
- Height: 153 cm (5 ft 0 in)

Etsuko Ishikawa (石川 悦子, Ishikawa Etsuko; born May 22, 1965) is a Japanese actress and voice actress from Tokyo, Japan.

== Filmography ==
=== Anime ===
Year	Title	Role	Network	Ref.
1992	Nekketsu Saikyō Go-Saurer	Yoji's sister	TV Tokyo	
1994	Brave Police J-Decker	Seia Onoe	TV Asahi	
1995	Slayers	Erisiel Vrumugun	TV Tokyo	
2012	Usagi no Mofy	Oruna-sama	NHK BS Premium, NHK-E	

=== Original video animation (OVA) ===
Year	Title	Role
1997	Wild 7	Fujina Sawaguchi

=== Video games ===
Year	Title	Role
1989	Cobra: Kokuryū Ō no Densetsu	Lady Armaroid, Savoiler
1991	The Space Adventure	Lady Armaroid
1998	Zutto issho	Sayaka Imai
2003	Shira-chū Tanken-bu	Rina Kamo
2005	Ururun Quest Koiyūki	Laosia

=== Dubbing ===
Title	Role	Notes
Executive Decision		
Goodfellas		
Gia	Linda (Elizabeth Mitchell)	
Sweet November		
The Empire Strikes Back		TV Asahi version
Sister Act	Mary Robert	
Sister Act 2: Back in the Habit	Mary Robert	
Underdog		
Toy Story		
Toy Story 2		
Faust		
Private Practice	Rose	
Born Yesterday		
Made in America	Zola Matthews (Nia Long)	
Around the Bend	Katrina	
Lethal Weapon 2	Rika (Patsy Kensit)	
The Rookie	Sarah	

=== Narration ===
Title	Network
NHK Kōkōkoza	NHK-E
