= Ayumi =

- Pronunciation: Á-yú-mí
- Gender: Female
- Language: Japanese

Origin
- Meaning: many different meanings depending on the kanji used

Other names
- See also: Ayumu; Yumi

Ayumi (あゆみ, アユミ) is a feminine Japanese given name. It is rarely used as a surname.

== Written forms ==
Ayumi can be written using different kanji characters and can mean:

- 歩み, "course" "walking" "progress"

as a given name

- 歩, "progress", "walking", "a step"
- 歩美, "walking, beauty"
- 歩実, "walking, truth"
- 鮎己, "sweetfish, oneself"
- 亜由美, "Asia, reason, beauty"
- 安愉海, "peaceful, pleasure, sea"
- 明征魅, "bright, conquer, fascination"
- 充裕実, "provide, abundant, truth"
- 歩未, "walking", "not yet"

The given name can also be written in hiragana and katakana.

- あゆみ, in hiragana
- アユミ, in katakana
- あゆ美, mixture of hiragana and kanji

as a surname

- 漢人
- 阿弓

== People with the name ==
- Ayumi Beppu (別府 あゆみ, born 1983), Japanese actress, tarento, and model
- Ayumi Endō (遠藤 あゆみ), Japanese artist
- Ayumi Fujimura (藤村 歩, born 1982), Japanese voice actress
- Ayumi Hamasaki (浜崎 あゆみ, born 1978), Japanese singer
- Iconiq (real name Ayumi Itō 伊藤 亜由美, born 1984), Zainichi Korean singer who was a member of the Korean girl group Sugar
- Ayumi Ishida (actress) (いしだ あゆみ, born 1948), Japanese actress and singer
- Ayumi Ishida (Morning Musume member) (石田 亜佑美, born 1997), Japanese singer who is a member of the J-pop girl group Morning Musume
- Ayumi Ito (伊藤 歩, born 1980), Japanese actress
- Ayumi Kaihori (海堀あゆみ, born 1986) Japanese association footballer
- Ayumi Karino (狩野 亜由美, born 1984), Japanese softball player
- Ayumi Kida (喜田あゆ美, born 1966), Japanese actress
- Ayumi Kinoshita (木下 あゆ美, born 1982), Japanese actress and model
- Ayumi Komura (小村 あゆみ), Japanese manga artist
- Ayumi Kurashima (倉島亜由美, born 1977), Japanese freelance animator
- Ayumi Kurihara (栗原 亜弓, born 1984), joshi puroresu wrestler
- Ayumi Miyazaki (宮崎歩, born 1971), Japanese singer
- Ayumi Morita (森田 あゆみ, born 1990), Japanese tennis professional
- Ayumi Murata (村田あゆみ, born 1982), Japanese singer
- Ayumi Nagashii (永椎 あゆみ, born 1974), alias for the Japanese voice actress Ryoka Yuzuki
- Ayumi Nakamura (中村 亜友美; born 1990), Japanese volleyball player
- Ayumi Niekawa (born 1994), Japanese male association footballer
- Ayumi Oka (岡あゆみ, born 1983), Japanese actress
- Ayumi Oka (岡あゆみ, born 1986), Japanese tennis player
- Okinoumi Ayumi (born 1985), sumo wrestler
- Ayumi Onodera (born 1978), Japanese curler
- Ayumi Sato (佐藤 あゆみ; born 1977), Japanese ice hockey player
- Ayumi Shibata (柴田 あゆみ, born 1984), Japanese singer
- Ayumi Shigemori (茂森 あゆみ, born 1971), Japanese actress and pop star
- Ayumi Shiina (椎名 あゆみ, born 1969), Japanese shōjo manga artist
- Ayumi Tanimoto (谷本 歩実, born 1981), Japanese female judoka
- Ayumi Tsuji (辻 あゆみ, born 1984), Japanese voice actress
- Ayumi Tsunematsu (恒松 あゆみ, born 1981), Japanese actress
- Ayumi Yasutomi, (安冨 歩, born 1963), Japanese economist and politician

=== Fictional characters ===
- Ayumi Shinozaki (篠崎 あゆみ), a main character from the Corpse Party franchise.
- Ayumi Yoshida (吉田 歩美), a secondary character from Detective Conan who is renamed Amy Yeager in some English adaptations.
- The Groovy Girls doll line, by Manhattan Toy, features a doll named Ayumi.
- Ayumi Tachibana, main character from video game series Famicom Detective Club.
- Ayumi Takahara (高原 歩美), supporting character in the anime Kami Nomi zo Shiru Sekai.
- Ayumi Otosaka (乙坂 歩未), main character in the anime Charlotte.
- Ayumi Sakagami (坂上 あゆみ), a character from the Pretty Cure All Stars films

== See also ==
- Ayumu
