= Tenchi Universe =

Japanese anime television series

- Title card

天地無用! (Tenchi Muyō!)
- Genre: Adventure, Fantasy, Harem
- Anime television series
- Directed by: Hiroshi Negishi
- Written by: Ryoe Tsukimura
- Music by: Seikou Nagaoka
- Studio: AIC
- Licensed by: NA: Geneon Entertainment (former) Crunchyroll (current)
- Original network: TV Tokyo
- English network: US: Cartoon Network (Toonami), International Channel, KTEH
- Original run: April 2, 1995 – September 24, 1995
- Episodes: 26
- Feature films
- 1. Tenchi the Movie: Tenchi Muyo in Love; 2. Tenchi Forever! The Movie
- Related series
- 1. Tenchi Muyo! Ryo-Ohki; 2. Tenchi Muyo! GXP; 3. Tenchi Muyo! War on Geminar; 4. Tenchi in Tokyo; 5. Ai Tenchi Muyo!

Tenchi Universe (天地無用!, Tenchi Muyō!) is a Japanese anime television series animated by AIC and produced by Pioneer LDC. It is loosely based on the first six episodes of the Tenchi Muyo! Ryo-Ohki OVA series. The series premiered on April 2, 1995, in Japan and concluded its airing on September 24, 1995. The series aired in the United States on Cartoon Network's cartoon block Toonami on July 20, 2000, and ended on August 24, 2000. Two feature films came from this canon, Tenchi the Movie: Tenchi Muyo in Love and Tenchi Forever! The Movie. Funimation announced distribution of the series, along with several other Tenchi properties, on July 2, 2010, at Anime Expo.

This series introduces three new characters: Mihoshi's partner Kiyone Makibi (who first appears in the "Mihoshi Special"), the bounty hunter and Ryoko's rival, Nagi, and her cabbit companion, Ken-Ohki. The series portrays characters with different personalities; Washu is a mildly-insane egomaniac with two pop-up dolls that proclaim her greatness, and Mihoshi is a comic relief character whose constant bumbling, blunders and crying fits often cause the gang to get into trouble.

== Story ==
Long ago, a legendary warrior and crown prince of the Juraian Empire, Yosho, disappeared and never to be heard again. Unknown to the Juraian Empire, Yosho never wanted to become a ruler and only wanted a quiet peaceful life; he settled on Earth. He discovered the Misaki Shrine and married the daughter of the Misaki priest, Itsuki Masaki; he would rename himself as Katsuhito Masaki. The two later had a daughter, Lady Achika Masaki, princess of Jurai. She would later marry her high school love, Nobuyuki, and the two had Tenchi. Unfortunately, Achika died from illness one snowy winter; Nobuyuki and Katsuhito helped raise Tenchi in the country side, near the Misaki Family Shrine. Tenchi's life was at first normal, but things quickly changed when intergalactic alien girls started coming into his life.

At 17, Tenchi's life was dramatically changed by the appearance of Space Pirate Ryoko. Evading the Galaxy Police (GXP), Ryoko was piloting her spaceship and cabbit, Ryo-Ohki, and battled with GXP officer Mihoshi when both crash-landed near Tenchi's home. Tenchi found an unconscious Ryoko and tended to her. When she awakened, she gave a fantastic story of how she's being pursued by a terrible space pirate, temporarily earning the Misaki family's trust and gaining their shelter. However, Ryoko's lies easily fell apart when it was discovered her pursuer was actually the GXP and Ryoko is the true pirate. Unfortunately, with Mihoshi's ship destroyed, it was pointless to arrest Ryoko; both girls stayed at the hospitality of the Misaki house.

Desiring to return home, Mihoshi activated an emergency beacon and it was detected by Juraian Princess Ayeka. When Ayeka arrived, she was shocked to find her old nemesis, Ryoko, was there. Starting a fight, the two battled each other by ship combat and both lost their ships in battle; Ayeka ended as the recent addition to the Misaki household, along with her robotic wooden guardians, Azaka and Kamidake. Not long, Ayeka's little sister, Princess Sasami, had arrived to rescue her sister.

It was around this time that Ryoko revealed that her ship can regenerate itself. In her cabbit form, Ryo-Ohki developed a great love for carrots and could not get enough of them. By the time Sasami arrived, both Ayeka and Ryoko developed romantic feelings for Tenchi. Reluctant to leave, it was time for everyone to part ways. Unfortunately, Sasami accidentally had a carrot with her and it attracted Ryo-Ohki. The cabbit could not resist the lure of the carrot and collided with each other's ships, causing everyone to be stranded on Earth.

The final two ladies to arrive would be legendary mad scientist Washu and Mihoshi's partner, Kiyone. Washu was imprisoned in a special crystal prison for her crimes of creating time-space devices with devastating effects upon the galaxy. Washu's crystal crash-landed in Japan and the inhabitants founded the Misaki Shrine to prevent people accessing the crystal, correctly assuming it is not a safe object. However, thanks to Ryoko's intervention, she was accidentally freed. She eventually set up two dimensional doorways within the Misaki house, one in a closet allowing her to cross dimensions between her lab and the Misaki family and the other in the bathroom creating a male and a female bathroom to allow privacy.

Lastly, Kiyone was sent to find Mihoshi. After finding her, the two were assigned to patrol and tour the Solar System; it is a severe downgrade. Both lived away from Tenchi's home and have their own place in the city, but due to Mihoshi's frequent blunders, making a living on Earth and balancing GXP duties was hard and Kiyone curses her fortunes because of it. Despite the occasional flares in battles between Ayeka and Ryoko, life was relatively alright until the Juraian military had come for the princesses.

Unknown to the princesses, the Juraian royal hierarchy of power was usurped by the sudden return of Yosho; it was actually Kagato in disguise. Yosho and Kagato both battled for the succession of Jurai in the past and Kagato lost. However, with Yosho conveniently missing, Kagato took his place as the long lost direct heir to the throne. Kagato then used his royal authority to have the military arrest and prosecute both princesses in an attempt to solidify his dominance in Jurai. The Juraian military arrived at the shrine and transported the house with everyone except Tenchi, Ryo-ohki, and Katsuhito into a battleship, seconds later, returning everyone except Ryoko and the princesses and shrinking the house and the robots into handheld sizes. However, they used Kiyone's cruiser and Ryo-ohki to free them and were on the run. Although not originally involved, the GXP was also under the influence of the Juraian Empire and Mihoshi managed to learn about the corrupted collusion between the GXP and Jurai; it made both Mihoshi and Kiyone fugitives. Framed for crimes of treason and terrorism against the crown, the whole group is on the run from the Juraian Empire and the GXP; they journey to Jurai in attempts to clear their names.

Being on the run was a difficult process. The group had to escape detection from local authorities on top of the GXP, but also make money in between to cover costs for food, fuel, and repairs to their ship. Washu was able to restore the robots to original size and operation as well as the house within the cargo hold of the ship, which served as the main area, excluding the cockpit, for the entire crew(same as it had on Earth). Things were often complicated due to Mihoshi's constant blundering nature as well as Ryoko's selfish nature. On top of that, Ryoko is also evading a long rival, Space Hunter Nagi, while committing major thefts to help sustain the group. However, the group managed to make it to the inner Juraian System.

Disguising their ship and themselves as a school group, the team had success infiltrating Juraian security thanks to Washu's anti-detection measures; it was once again fumbled by Mihoshi. Nearly unable to escape, the group was secretly aided by a loyalist to escape. While on their way to Jurai, Mihoshi's clumsy nature got them detected by a Jurian warship. However, Katsuhito instructed the crew how to escape capture: by entering a forbidden Juraian planet. Because it is a sacred place for Juraian royalty, their pursuers was forced to stand down until permitted entry. To take back Jurai, the team is going to need powerful warriors. Yosho decided to resurrect two legendary Juraian knights, the real bodies of Azaka and Kamidake, to aid in their quest. Although the Juraian knights have returned, their robotic counterparts were deactivated to bring them back. It was there that Katsuhito revealed himself as the true Yosho and the knights pledged loyalty to Yosho as their king.

It was at a Juraian villa that Yosho explained the nature of their enemy, Kagato, and his past. A rival and Juraian heir, Kagato became too obsessed with power and it caused him to abuse his Juraian powers. Yosho was forced to face his rival and defeated him in battle, but did not kill him. Kagato disappeared into the darkness and it was around the same time that Yosho decided to quietly settle down on Earth. Due to the shame and disgrace of Kagato's actions, the Juraian royalty erased the existence of Kagato, explaining why the princesses never heard about Kagato. However, Yosho's identity also pointed out that Tenchi is a direct heir to Jurai's crown.

On the eve before facing Kagato, both Tenchi and Ayeka was affected by recent news the most. Tenchi always saw himself as a normal high school boy, not heir to a major power in the galaxy; Ayeka was happy about it. She always knew her vacation on Earth would eventually end and she would have to bid farewell. However, with Tenchi as a direct heir, they can be together at each other's side for a long time, something Ryoko was not happy about. However, romantic intentions have to hold as Kagato appeared.

Kagato appeared for a private rematch with Yosho. Unfortunately, Kagato found a way to maintain his youth and also increased his powers; the aged Yosho lost the battle. Ryoko joined the battle, but was critically injured. Kagato then kidnaps Ayeka and flees. In critical condition, Yosho encouraged Tenchi to face his destiny with courage. Motivated to end the dark reign of Kagato, Tenchi and the royal knights journeyed to Jurai to face Kagato. Still injured from her fight, Ryoko pleaded with Tenchi to run away with her, but he was not swayed; Ryoko offered to take the trio to Jurai.

After Ryo-Ohki crash-landed on Jurai, Tenchi and his guardians stormed the palace. Kagato had his own dark royal knights and they tried to stop Tenchi, but Azaka and Kamidake defeated them both. In between, the rest of the girls managed to hold up the Jurian battle fleet by infecting their computers with a computer virus Washu created. Ryoko was severely injured helping Tenchi, losing a lot of blood, she lost consciousness due to her injuries and her fate is unknown. Now at the palace throne, Kagato fought against Tenchi. At first, Tenchi was losing, but the Juraian trees reacted to Tenchi and empowered him to rival Kagato. Theorizing Jurai itself has chosen its own master, Kagato angrily fought against Tenchi and lost; he admitted defeat and died and Tenchi saved Ayeka.

In the aftermath, there was a great media storm over past events. Everyone accused of crimes against the Juraian Empire has been exonerated. Yosho survived his ordeal and was happily treated by a group of pretty Juraian nurses. Ayeka decided not to punish anyone involved with Kagato, but the conspirators themselves quietly resigned to avoid retribution. Washu's involvement made her an honorary president of the Universal Science Academy and she vowed to use her skills for peace; barely a month later, she was ousted for developing a weapon that could destroy the whole universe. At the GXP, Kiyone got promoted to Detective Sergeant and Mihoshi was promoted to Chief Criminal Prevention Officer (albeit avoiding her responsibilities to hang with Kiyone). Azaka and Kamidake are no longer royal guardians, but chose to continue serving the princesses. Their robotic counterparts were resurrected thanks to Washu and return to Ayeka's side. However, Ryoko's fate remains unknown.

As for Tenchi, he has no interest in succeeding as Jurai's next ruler; he just wants to return to Earth and live a normal life. However, there was no mention of who would fill in the power vacuum. Tenchi resumes life back as it was, but finds it hard to adapt after living with so many girls; he misses them. Just as he thought of them, Ryoko appeared before him. She affectionately hugs him and declares that she intends to fairly win Tenchi's heart. It was also around this time that Washu decided to return to Earth. Kiyone and Mihoshi return to Earth as well, taking back their old apartment. Ayeka decides to run away and return to Tenchi's side; Sasami decides also to run off and the guardians join in as well. The story ends with all the girls coming back into his life once again.

== Characters ==
=== Major characters ===
- Tenchi Masaki
- Ryoko
- Ayeka Jurai
- Sasami Jurai
- Ryo-Ohki
- Washu Hakubi
- Mihoshi Kuramitsu
- Kiyone Makibi

=== Other characters ===
- Katsuhito Masaki
- Nobuyuki Masaki
- Nagi
- Kagato
- Achika Masaki
- Haruna

=== Minor characters ===
- Ken-Ohki (眷皇鬼, Kenōki) Voiced by: Akiko Yajima

Ken-Ohki is Nagi's cabbit partner. Like Ryō-Ohki, Ken-Ohki can transform himself into a space battleship, although the configuration and color is slightly different from Ryō-Ohki. And like Ryō-Ohki, Ken-Ohki has developed a love of carrots. Ken-Ohki and Ryō-Ohki also love each other, which complicates Nagi's almost obsessive quest to capture Ryōko. But this love had also saved Nagi from being killed by Ryōko, not to mention aiding Ryōko when she, Tenchi, and the knights Azaka and Kamidake stormed the Jurai palace to save Ayeka.

- Mecha-Washū (メカ鷲羽, Meka-Washū) Voiced by: Yūko Kobayashi (Japanese); Kate T. Vogt (English)

This android duplicate of Washū was supposed to be a supplemental worker, imprinted with the mad genius's intellect. Somehow, a single hair from Mihoshi found its way into the transfer unit. It was after an explosion (caused by Mihoshi) that Washū discovered that, instead of Washū's mind, the android gains Mihoshi's mind and temperament. Washū also developed a spare body for Mecha-Washū which she used after Washū self-detonated her original body and the spare body is not equipped with a self-destruct device. The group had a hard time dealing with Mecha-Washū until Kiyone came by, as she knew how Mihoshi's mind works, which enabled her to shut down Mecha-Washū. Mecha-Washū has most of Washū's physical features, but with Mihoshi's ear and eye characteristics, as well as her hairstyle. Eventually Washū tried to create a second Mecha-Washū but Ryō-Ohki somehow caused it to gain her characteristics.

- Mitsuki (満奇) Voiced by: Yuka Koyama (Japanese); Debi Derryberry (English)

Mitsuki graduated from the same Galaxy Police Academy class Kiyone graduated from, but at a lower score. She is a very ambitious person, and will stoop to anything to get ahead of Kiyone... even capturing her when Kiyone got implicated in Ayeka's problems with Jurai. At the end of the series, Mitsuki was demoted to being Kiyone's errand girl, following Kiyone's promotion to Detective Sergeant and Mihoshi's promotion to Chief Criminal Prevention Officer.

- Mirei (美零) Voiced by: Hiroko Konishi (Japanese); Debi Derryberry (English)

Mirei is a mysterious ghost girl whose life before she died is unknown to her, although she has a photograph which is her only clue. When the Yagami stopped in the Sargasso sea of space a.k.a. the ship's graveyard, that was when Mirei's ship appeared before them. She invited Sasami and Ryō-ohki on board, after which the two started to have fun and decided to scare the rest of the group, who had come aboard to look for Sasami. Then after sampling Sasami's memories, Mirei, Sasami, and Ryō-ohki continued to play through things such as an amusement park and a fireworks display. Eventually Sasami realized she had to return to the Yagami as everyone was worried. But as a gift, Sasami and Ryō-ohki's image were added to the photograph to help remember their happiest time together.

- Amarube (餘部) Voiced by: Tsutomu Kashiwakura (Japanese); Richard Cansino (English) and Yura (由良) Voiced by: Yūko Nagashima (Japanese); Debi Derryberry (English)

Two runaways who steal Kiyone's ship Yagami, (with an unknowing Nobuyuki and Katsuhito on board who were playing Shiogi, a Japanese version of chess) when the Masaki clan stopped at a station to order beef dons. Of course, the two of them did not know about the trouble the Masakis were in, and soon found themselves chased by the G.P. and Jurai... something they never counted on! Eventually they ended up flying towards a star, but the Masaki group (minus Ayeka and Sasami) arrived on Ryō-ohki, retaken the ship, and used Washu's calculations to use the sun's gravity to escape. They then sent Amarube and Yura away on an escape pod.

- Sagami (相模) Voiced by: Akifumi Endō (Japanese); Richard Cansino (English)

During the Masaki clan's trip through the Jurai checkpoint, Sagami met Tenchi (disguised as a girl named Tenko) after he went to check-in station. Sagami then went to the Cafe with Sasami and Tenchi, but after Ryōko and Mihoshi came through when Mihoshi's bungling had exposed them, Sagami was able to help slow down some of the guards. Later when Sasami was separated from the group, Sagami knocked out the guards that heard her and then gave Tenchi a staff to fight off the guards, although it exposed Tenchi's true identity to him. It turned out that Sagami was an agent of Sasami and Ayeka's uncle and was helping the group in order for them to make it into Jurai territory.

- Outpost Chief (長官, Chōkan) Voiced by: Ikuya Sawaki

While in disguise on Jurai's checkpoint to get into the Jurai territory, Sasami remembered the time when she used to play with her uncle on Jurai. Her uncle, the outpost chief for the checkpoint, easily recognized her through her disguise. He helped weaken the security grid and had his man Sagami assist the Masaki clan in getting away when they were discovered, giving them a chance to escape from the checkpoint into Jurai territory. He helped rescue Sasami after she was separated from the group and then rendered unconscious by knockout gas; he then got her back to the group safely. After their escape, Sasami saw him as they were leaving and realized that her uncle had helped them escape, and he realized how much Sasami had grown up. It is implied that he knew the current emperor was not the real Yosho.

- Tetta (哲多) Voiced by: Yoshio Kawai (Japanese); Doug Stone (English) and Tessei (哲清) Voiced by: Shin-ichiro Miki (Japanese); Richard Cansino (English)

Tetta and Tessei are the Juraian knights that served Kagato. The knights Azaka and Kamidake each faced these two knights respectively. Although both Tetta and Tessei were just as skilled as Azaka and Kamidake and had techniques that were not available in Azaka and Kamidake's time, both of the noble knights pointed out that they, along with their master, lacked the spirit of chivalry. With their courage and nobility, Azaka and Kamidake killed Tetta and Tessei.

- Itsuki Masaki (斎, Itsuki)

Yōshō's (Katsuhito) wife in the TV series continuity and Achika's mother. Itsuki briefly appears in Episode 22 and Tenchi Forever! The Movie, when Yōshō explains that after he met her shortly after landing on Earth, he changed his name Katsuhito Masaki when he married her. It was because of this that the spirit of Yōshō's deceased love Haruna awoke and felt betrayed, that she would later kidnap Tenchi. Itsuki made a brief appearance at the end of Tenchi Muyo in Love 2 where after Katsuhito said goodbye to Haruna, Itsuki's spirit appeared in her child form and Katsuhito pointed out to her not to be jealous.

== Broadcast history ==
Tenchi Universe was broadcast on TV Tokyo from 2 April 1995 to 24 September 1995. It was aired on ABS-CBN in the Philippines from 1998 to 1999.

The English-dubbed version of Tenchi Universe first appeared on San Jose PBS member station Superstation KTEH (now KQEH) in 1997 in its original, uncut and uncensored form, as part of its Sunday Late-Prime (9pm-after 12) Sci-Fi programming line-up, and was later picked up by Cartoon Network in 2000 for wider broadcast on its Toonami block (US and Europe). The Toonami version was edited for content, and featured custom opening and closing credits.

After Cartoon Network's rights to broadcast the show expired, the now-defunct International Channel picked up the rights to air the dubbed version in 2004.

In South America, a Spanish dub (co-produced in Chile by Cloverway Inc.) was broadcast on Univision, while the Brazilian-Portuguese version was dubbed on Herbert Richers and was broadcast only on FTA channels TV Bandeirantes and Rede 21.

== Music ==
- Background music/score was composed by Seikou Nagaoka.
- Opening: Tenchi Muyo! (Japanese and English versions performed by SONIA)
- Ending: "Ginga de chokuritsu hokô" ["Walking Tall in the Milky Way"] ("Up-Walk in the Galaxy") (Japanese version performed by Ai Orikasa and Yumi Takada; English version performed by Diane Michelle)

"Up-Walk in the Galaxy" is intended to act like Ryoko and Ayeka singing two versions of the same song, each of them trying to stake their claim for Tenchi.

=== Insert songs ===
- Episode 6: "Ai no Ejiki" ["Victim of Love"] (Japanese version performed by Yuko Mizutani and Yuri Amano; English version performed by Ellen Gerstell and Sherry Lynn)
- Episode 13: "Towa ni towa ni hoshi no yume" ["Never-Ending Dream of Stars"] ("Forevermore") (Japanese version performed by Ai Orikasa; English version performed by Diane Michelle)
- Episode 16: "Koi wa Chigai Hōken" ["Love Is Extraterritorial"] (Japanese version performed by Ai Orikasa; English version performed by Petrea Burchard) (This song is absent in the Toonami version.)
  - "Ginga ni Imasokari" ("I'm the Only One") (Japanese version performed by Yumi Takada; English version performed by Jennifer Darling)
  - "Photon, Proton, Synchrotron" (Japanese version performed by Yuko Kobayashi; English version performed by Kate T. Vogt)
- Episode 26: "Ren'ai no jikū" ["Dimension of Love"] (Japanese version performed by Ai Orikasa; English version performed by Diane Michelle)
