= Ayumu =

- Pronunciation: Á-yú-mú
- Gender: Female
- Language: Japanese

Origin
- Meaning: many different meanings depending on the kanji used

Other names
- See also: Ayumi

Ayumu (あゆむ, アユム) is a unisex Japanese given name. Notable people with the name include:

== Written forms ==
Ayumi can be written using different kanji characters and can mean:

as a given name

- 歩, "progress", "walking", "a step"
- 歩夢, "walking, dream"

The given name can also be written in hiragana and katakana.

- あゆむ, in hiragana
- アユム, in katakana

== People with the name ==
- Ayumu Goromaru (五郎丸 歩; born 1986), Japanese rugby union player
- Ayumu Gunji (郡司 歩; born 1985), Japanese professional wrestler
- Ayumu Hirano (平野 歩夢; born 1998), Japanese snowboarder
- Ayumu Honda (本田 アユム; born 1988), Japanese professional wrestler
- Ayumu Ishikawa (石川 歩; born 1988), Japanese baseball player
- Ayumu Iwasa (岩佐 歩夢; born 2001), Japanese racing driver
- Ayumu Kameda (亀田 歩夢; born 2006), Japanese professional footballer
- Ayumu Kawai (川井 歩; born 1999), Japanese footballer
- Ayumu Kokaji (小鍜治 歩; born 2000), Japanese rugby union player
- Ayumu Matsuo (松尾 歩; born 1980), Japanese shogi player
- Ayumu Mochizuki (望月 歩; born 2000), Japanese actor
- Ayumu Murase (村瀬 歩; born 1988), Japanese voice actor
- Ayumu Nagato (永藤 歩; born 1997), Japanese footballer
- Ayumu Nakajima (中島 歩; born 1988), Japanese actor
- Ayumu Nakazawa (中澤 歩), Japanese voice actor
- Ayumu Nedefuji (子出藤 歩夢; born 1994), Japanese snowboarder
- Ayumu Ōhata (大畑 歩夢; born 2001), Japanese professional footballer
- Ayumu Saito (斎藤 歩; 1964–2025), Japanese playwright, director, actor, and theatre producer
- Ayumu Sasaki (佐々木 歩夢; born 2000), Japanese motorcycle racer
- Ayumu Seko (瀬古 歩夢; born 2000), Japanese footballer
- Ayumu Tachibana (立花 歩; born 1995), Japanese footballer
- Ayumu Watanabe (渡辺 歩; born 1966), Japanese anime director
- Ayumu Yokoyama (横山 歩夢; born 2003), Japanese footballer

== Fictional characters ==
- Ayumu Aikawa (相川 歩), protagonist of the light novel series Kore wa Zombie Desu ka?
- Ayumu Tanaka (田中 歩), character in the manga series Soredemo Ayumu wa Yosetekuru
- Ayumu "Osaka" Kasuga (春日 歩), character in the manga series Azumanga Daioh
- Ayumu Nishizawa (西沢 歩), character in the manga series Hayate the Combat Butler
- Ayumu Uehara (上原 歩夢), a character in the media project Nijigasaki High School Idol Club
- Ayumu Yamato (山登 あゆむ), a character in the manga series Idaten Jump

== See also ==
- Ayumu (chimpanzee)
- Ayumi
