= Akira Endo =

Akira Endo is the name of:

- Akira Endo (biochemist) (1933–2024), Japanese biochemist
- Akira Endo (conductor) (1938–2014), Japanese-American music conductor
