= Akifumi Endō =

Japanese voice actor

- Born: December 10, 1964 (age 61); Tokyo, Japan
- Occupation: Voice actor

Akifumi Endō (遠藤 章史, Endō Akifumi; born December 10, 1964) is a Japanese voice actor who is affiliated with Troubadour Musique Office.

== Voice roles ==
=== Anime television ===
- Hunter × Hunter (Sedokan)
- Mahoromatic (Yoshihiko Gunji, Kanzaki)
- Shura no Toki (Sakamoto Ryōma)
- Tenchi Universe (Sagami)
- Brave Police J-Decker (Makoto Onoue)

=== OVA ===
- SD Gundam Gaiden (Knight Nyuu)

=== Anime films ===
- Mobile Suit Gundam F91 (Chris)

=== Video games ===
- Brave Saga 2 (Shizuma)
