= Yasuhiro Enoki =

Japanese baseball player

- Pitcher
- Born: May 22, 1972 (age 53)
- Bats: Right Throws: Right

NPB debut
- April 17, 1991, for the Lotte Orions

NPB statistics (through 2000)
- Win–loss record: 10-15
- ERA: 4.71
- Strikeouts: 98

Teams
- Lotte Orions (1991–1997, 2000); Yomiuri Giants (1998–1999)

Yasuhiro Enoki (born May 22, 1972) is a former baseball player from Japan. He played for the Chiba Lotte Marines in the Pacific League.
