= S-CRY-ed =

Japanese anime series

s-CRY-ed
- スクライド
- Genre: Action, science fiction
- Created by: Hajime Yatate; Sunrise
- Screenplay by: Yōsuke Kuroda
- Directed by: Gorō Taniguchi
- Music by: Kōtarō Nakagawa
- Country of origin: Japan
- Original language: Japanese
- No. of episodes: 26 (list of episodes)

Production
- Producers: Fukashi Azuma (TV Tokyo); Kazunori Takashiro; Takashi Kouchiyama; Yukio Muneoka
- Production companies: TV Tokyo; Yomiko Advertising; Sunrise

Original release
- Network: TXN (TV Tokyo)
- Release: July 4 – December 26, 2001

Related
- Manga
- Written by: Yōsuke Kuroda
- Illustrated by: Yasunari Toda
- Published by: Akita Shoten
- English publisher: NA: Tokyopop
- Magazine: Weekly Shōnen Champion
- Original run: June 4, 2001 – May 2, 2002
- Volumes: 5
- Light novel
- Written by: Kazuho Hyodo
- Illustrated by: Hisashi Hirai
- Published by: MediaWorks
- Imprint: Dengeki Bunko
- Original run: May 10, 2002 – May 10, 2003
- Volumes: 3
- Anime film

s-CRY-ed Alteration Tao
- Directed by: Gorō Taniguchi
- Written by: Yōsuke Kuroda
- Music by: Kōtarō Nakagawa
- Studio: Sunrise
- Released: November 19, 2011
- Runtime: 98 minutes
- Anime film

s-CRY-ed Alteration Quan
- Directed by: Gorō Taniguchi
- Written by: Yōsuke Kuroda
- Music by: Kōtarō Nakagawa
- Studio: Sunrise
- Released: March 10, 2012
- Runtime: 96 minutes

s-CRY-ed (Japanese: スクライド, Hepburn: Sukuraido), also known as s.CRY.ed or Scryed, is a 26-episode Japanese anime television series which first aired in Japan on TV Tokyo. The series is written by Yōsuke Kuroda, produced by Sunrise, and directed by Gorō Taniguchi, with music composed by Kōtarō Nakagawa. It is set in an alternative time in Kanagawa Prefecture where a phenomenon gave 1% of its people supernatural powers; they are known as Alters. The plot follows a young Alter mercenary known as Kazuma, as well as Ryuho, a man working for the Alter special forces known as HOLY, who become rivals as their areas clash.

The series' concept originated in 1999 when Taniguchi was working on Infinite Ryvius. He wanted to create another series that would contain themes similar to it, as well as new ones centered mostly on how people adapted to the 21st century. The prototype of the series was released as a one-shot manga called "s-CRY-ed 0" drawn by Yasunari Toda, compiled in the S-CRY-ed Anime Book (Japanese: スクライド アニメブック) by Akita Shoten. The final manga version of s-CRY-ed (also drawn by Yasunari Toda), was serialized in Akita Shoten's Weekly Shōnen Champion before the anime's broadcast. A novelization by Kazuho Hyodo has been published. Additionally, a two-part recollection film was released by Sunrise. Both the anime and the manga have also seen English release.

s-CRY-ed has been popular in Japan, often appearing on polls taken by Japanese magazines, and once took third place in the Anime Grand Prix awards. Critical reception to the series has been generally positive, with reviewers noting while initial episodes might be simple, the plot becomes more interesting as the series unfolds.

== Story ==
=== Setting ===
The series takes place several years after "The Great Uprising", a series of powerful geological events which occurred in Kanagawa Prefecture near Tokyo, dividing the city in two parts: The "Lost Ground" and the "Mainland". Alongside this disaster, many people in the Lost Ground began to develop a power known as "Alter", granting them the ability to create weapons with supernatural properties. Among the steadily rising number of Alter users, there are two forces who directly oppose each other: the "Native Alters", who live outside the central city and avoid any relationships with the government, and "HOLY", a subgroup of an organization called "HOLD" (which functions as the Mainland government's super police force and representative in the Lost Ground) and is composed exclusively of Alter users who serve as a special operations unit tasked with dangerous missions.

=== Plot ===
Kazuma is a Native Alter user who makes his living as a mercenary so that he and his close friend, Kanami Yuta, can live together.

Kazuma's friend Kunihiko Kimishima gives him a mission to defeat another Native Alter user. However, a man known as Ryuho from HOLY captures Kazuma in the aftermath; during this, Ryuho tries to interrogate Kazuma about an unknown Alter user (later dubbed Crystal) who killed his mother and dog.

After managing to break free of his bonds, Kazuma uses a female HOLY agent named Mimori Kiryu as a hostage and manages to escape the facility and make it back to his house. However, HOLY then arrives and proceeds to capture many Native Alter users, during which Kazuma meets Crystal in a forest and the two proceed to fight, after which his Alter receives a power-up.

Later on, it's revealed the Great Uprising was caused by a similar event in a parallel universe where all creatures are independent, thinking Alters.

Kazuma then goes on a rampage against HOLY after Kimishima dies while helping him during one of his fights which leads to him and Ryuho fighting again; however, during their battle, they end up opening a gateway to the parallel universe, causing another uprising and attracting the attention of the Mainland government.

Both Kazuma and Ryuho are believed to have died following this event when, in actually, the former goes into hiding in an underground fighting circuit whilst the latter ends up suffering from amnesia. With help from an old friend, a HOLY member known as Straight Cougar, Kazuma recovers his will to protect Kanami who hasn't stopped looking for him. Meanwhile, Ryuho manages to recover his lost memories whilst protecting Natives from HOLY agents, ultimately leading to him becoming an ally of Kazuma.

The Mainland sends one of its best agents, Kyouji Mujo, to the Lost Ground in an attempt to exploit the power of the parallel universe for economic gain. However, Mujo develops delusions of grandeur after becoming the de facto head of the Lost Ground government and absorbing the Crystal entity from "the other side" to add to his already formidable Alter power.

Both he and Crystal are defeated by the separate efforts of Kazuma and Ryuho respectively, as both increase their Alter powers by taking energy from the parallel world. The Mainland once again attempts to exert control over the Lost Ground by sending in a fleet of refined Alter users under their control, only for all of them to be defeated by Kazuma and Ryuho.

Following the defeat of the Mainland forces, Kazuma and Ryuho decide to engage in one final battle in order to finally settle their rivalry. As one of them is about to declare victory, the screen fades to white. In an epilogue, taking place years later, they remain the protectors of the Lost Ground and defend it from Mainland invaders; meanwhile, an older Kanami awaits their return.

== Creation and release ==
According to the series' director Gorō Taniguchi, the idea for s-CRY-ed originated in 1999 when he was working on the series Infinite Ryvius. One of Infinite Ryvius's themes was people communicating with each other. The series' staff wanted to show people already on their own paths, focusing more on individualism. With the storyline beginning in the early 21st century, Taniguchi said the cast would already have adapted to the new times allowing s-CRY-ed to take more themes from Infinite Ryvius. The title s-CRY-ed is basically a combination of one English word and Japanese. The first lower-case "s" is a representation of the Japanese word su which means something in its natural form and not artificial. "Cry" comes from the English, and the last "ed" represents a person. Combined as "s-CRY-ed" the Sunrise studio staff wanted it to express the idea of how people react or interact when they are in their most natural state. They had devised the word when the project was in its early phases of production, and while it was meant to be a temporary name, the staff ended up using it as the title.

When asked by the staff of the magazine Animerica if the anime was influenced by Western superheroes like Spider-Man or Batman, Taniguchi denied that influence. Instead, he said his inspirations for s-CRY-ed were other works he had produced for Sunrise. The society shown in the series was not meant to be another take on classic superheroes but instead investigate how everyone can adapt to their own situation. While the series is known for the extensive action in its episodes, the director believes everything he wanted viewers to see was presented. To distinguish the HOLY members, the Sunrise staff researched the costumes they could design. Taniguchi said their outfits are meant to resemble prison uniforms.

In Japan, the series aired between July 4 and December 26, 2001, with a total of twenty-six episodes. These were collected on nine DVD volumes between November 25, 2001, and July 25, 2002. A DVD box set containing all the episodes was released on January 25, 2008; a Blu-ray box set was made available on October 26, 2011. The Blu-ray box of the series sold a total of 6,172 units during its release week in Japan.

The anime was licensed by Bandai Entertainment in early 2003. Starting in 2003, they released the show in North America as six individual Region 1 volumes, followed by a complete six-disc box set in November 2004. A Universal Media Disc version of the first volume was released on October 11, 2005. Bandai's European branch, Beez Entertainment, published the series in the United Kingdom. The release was a six-disc box set released between June 6, 2005, and February 27, 2006.

Later, the series premiered on Cartoon Network's Adult Swim in the United States on May 29, 2005, after select episodes had been aired on Adult Swim's video on demand service for nearly a year. On September 27, 2005, Bandai re-released s-CRY-ed under the Anime Legends banner, in three two-disc volumes, followed by the Anime Legends Complete Collection on October 24, 2006. Following the 2012 closure of Bandai Entertainment, Sunrise announced at Otakon 2013, that Sentai Filmworks had rescued s-CRY-ed, along with a handful of other former BEI titles. However, Sentai never re-released the anime and the license eventually expired. On May 3, 2020, it was announced that Discotek Media had picked up the license for S-CRY-ed. It was released on April 27, 2021, on Blu-ray. In Australia, the series is licensed by Madman Entertainment.

s-CRY-ed's music was composed by Kōtarō Nakagawa. Its original soundtrack was released on November 21, 2001, and two drama CDs were released on December 19 of the same year. For the first twenty-five episodes the opening and ending theme songs are "Reckless Fire" by Yasuaki Ide and "Drastic My Soul" by Mikio Sakai, respectively. However, for episode twenty-six, "Reckless Fire" is replaced by "Drastic My Soul", and the episode's ending theme is "Tabidachi no Kane ga Naru" ("The Bell of Setting out for a Journey Will Ring") by Sakai. There are also three insert songs starting with "All I Need Is Love" by Sakai for episodes fourteen and seventeen, "Magma" by Ide for episode nineteen, and "Discovery" by Sakai. Both the singles of "Reckless Fire" and "Drastic My Soul" were released on August 22, 2001.

== Films ==
On April 8, 2011, Sunrise announced on the official s-CRY-ed Japanese website the series would be re-released and re-mastered in a two-movie release comprising the entire series and including new footage, titled s-CRY-ed Alteration, as part of the s-CRY-ed 10th Anniversary Project. During its release, TAO, the first part, took fifteenth place at the Japanese box office earning US$141,055 on nine screens for a per-screen average of US$15,673. In the following week the film dropped off the charts. The Blu-ray of the first part was released on February 24, 2012. It sold 6,624 units in its release week; it had sold 7,726 units by the end of the second week.

The second part, QUAN, was released on March 10, 2011. Its Blu-ray volume was released on July 27 of the following year. The Blu-ray format of the second part sold a total of 6,543 units in Japan. The films also had a single CD including the new version of "Reckless Fire" alongside "SPIRITS" which was released on March 7, 2012. Additionally, another CD drama was released for the films on the same date as the single CD.

== Related media ==
The manga series written by Yōsuke Kuroda and illustrated by Yasunari Toda was published in the magazine Weekly Shōnen Champion between June 4, 2001, and May 2, 2002. The manga was collected in a total of five tankōbon (book) volumes. Tokyopop licensed this series in October 2002. They released the manga between March 11 and November 4, 2003.

Additionally, a light novel series was written by Kazuho Hyodo and illustrated by Hisashi Hirai and published by Dengeki Bunko. The series was released between May 10, 2002, and May 10, 2003. Additionally, Kazuma has appeared in the crossover role-playing game Heroes Phantasia.

== Reception ==
The series has been popular in Japan. Anihabara! listed s-CRY-ed in its top three anime series twice during 2001. In 2002, it took the same place in a poll by Animage. In the Animage's Anime Grand Prix awards, s-CRY-ed took the third place in the series category. The Kazuma character also took second place, being defeated by Inuyasha's title character. In a TV Asahi survey of the top hundred shows Japanese fans enjoyed, s-CRY-ed took 51st place. In March 2010, Kazuma was ranked nineteenth best male anime character of the 2000s by the Japanese magazine Newtype.

The anime series has received mostly positive reviews by manga and anime publications. DVD Verdict's Mac McEntire said that while the first volume lacked depth, its action scenes made the series as well as its characters appealing despite their tendency to shout their attacks. In a review of the same volume, John Sinnott of DVD Talk also said the fight scenes were good, remarking it has more "plot" in contrast to other fighting series. He also found the two protagonists, Kazuma and Ryuho, appealing noting they have multiple similarities that had yet to be explored. Regarding the series' dialog, he expressed a preference for the Japanese cast over the English one. Seb Reid of UK Anime Network enjoyed the anime series but unlike Sinnot he felt the English dub was more "enjoyable". He also found the series' beginning enjoyable noting that while the series might be simplistic, he like the theme of "freedom", mostly seen through Kazuma's personality. While agreeing with Reid about the plot (to the point of comparing Kazuma to Han Solo from the Star Wars franchise due to their anti-heroic traits), Anime News Network's Zac Bertschy disliked the English dub. He also found the main plot confusing. Reviewers also compared the series positively with the famous Clamp series X. Bryan Morton of Mania Beyond Entertainment found the morality of some characters, such as Ryuho, who has several reasons for his cold personality such as his quest for revenge, interesting. Despite some issues with the animation, and not being a fan of fights himself, he recommended the series for fans of Dragon Ball Z, a series famous for its fight scenes.

In a later review, Morton noted that Kazuma's character had developed as he not only fights Ryuho, but protect people from the Lost Ground. Despite saying he disliked the series for its focus on fighting, Morton noted s-CRY-ed "has grown on me a bit". Danielle D'Ornellas of Animefringe noted how many characters the anime covered, including both the protagonists and the antagonists, forcing viewers to pick which side they should root for. While she was not amazed by the animation, saying "strictly from an animation perspective, s-CRY-ed is average". She also found the English cast enjoyable while the music reminded her of a popular anime, Cowboy Bebop.

The series' plot development surprised some reviewers. Reid was amazed by how the plot changed until its ending to the point of calling it an "excellent end to a superior series" despite having been able to predict most of the plot twists in the series. Justin Rich of Mania noted how similar both Kazuma and Ryuho became across the series with the exception of their upbringings and commented they still keep clashing every time they meet. Both Rich and Norton of Mania shared mixed feelings regarding the finale finding Kyouji Mujo's fight to be anticlimactic. As well, while the former liked the conclusion, the latter found it disappointing. Nevertheless, both of them found the final fight between Kazuma and Ryuho highly appealing. Don Houston of DVD Talk enjoyed how the relationship between Kazuma and Ryuho developed similar to "buddy films". While still clashing, they came to develop a mutual respect. He also recommended fans buy the DVD box rather than single volumes because of their high prices. In his review of the final volume, Houston stated that while the series started as "generic" its development allowed him to enjoy more of the show. He felt the storyline could have been finished in less than twenty-six episodes.

s-CRY-ed was featured in an IGN article by Ryan Clements titled "The Anime We'd Love to Play". Clements commented that while the anime suffered from pacing and animation issues, both the cast and the powers were entertaining, remarking on the rivalry between Kazuma and Ryuho. In the 2007 book Manga: The Complete Guide author Jason Thompson found the manga "over-the-top" as an adaptation of the anime series. Thompson found it similar to Jojo's Bizarre Adventure based on the "enjoyably weird, exaggerated" art which is also one of the series' main appeal.
