= List of S-CRY-ed characters =

S-CRY-ed is an anime created by Sunrise. The plot is set in an alternate time where an earthquake known as the Great Uprising has divided a city in two sections: the Mainlands and the Lost Ground. One percent of the Lost Ground's people have developed supernatural powers known as "Alter". The series follows a young mercenary known as Kazuma from the Lost Ground. While doing one of his jobs he encounters a man known as Ryuho, a member from the Mainland Alter special forces known as HOLY. There has also been a manga adaptation of S-CRY-ed but following different events within the same cast.

== Protagonists ==
From left to right: Kunihiko Kimishima, Kanami Yuta and Kazuma.

=== Kazuma ===
Voiced by: Sōichirō Hoshi (Japanese); Steve Blum (English)

Kazuma (カズマ) is the main Protagonist of the story and is first portrayed as a reckless Alter user who'll do anything for money. Those around him do not know he is an Alter user, and believe he's merely avoiding work when he runs off for Kimishima's "jobs".^{[Episode 1]} While Kazuma has a temper, but also cares about his friends, putting his life on the line when they're in danger, most importantly Kanami Yuta, a girl he lives with.^{[Episode 25]} Originally considered a low-level Alter user by HOLY, Kazuma gradually makes himself an increasing priority with his continual defeat of HOLY's own Alter users.

Kazuma's Alter is called "Shell Bullet", an alloy-type Alter which transforms his right arm into a weapon.

At its first level, Shell Bullet covers Kazuma's right arm with armor and has three fin-like protrusions jutting out from his right shoulder blade, each getting progressively larger as they near his shoulder.^{[Episode 1]} In his second form, his arm is completely replaced by a much stronger metallic one, with a propeller replacing the three fins on his back. While, initially, this form caused him great pain due his arm slowly being disfigured as a result of its use, Kazuma would slowly grows strong enough to not only withstand, but eventually overcome this limitation. The third and final form of Kazuma's Alter, "Proud Fist", covers his entire body in golden armor, granting him Alter-absorbing fists that grow larger and replaces his propeller with a whip (though it serves much the same purpose as the previous fins and propeller^{[Episode 24]}).

In contrast, Kazuma's Alter only has two forms in the manga, with the second and final form being called "Death Bullet".

In the Animage's Anime Grand Prix 2002 awards, Kazuma took second place, being defeated by Inuyasha's title character.

=== Ryuho ===
Voiced by: Hikaru Midorikawa (Japanese); Jason Spisak (English)

At eighteen-years-old, Ryuho (劉鳳, Ryūhō) is widely regarded as the strongest agent of HOLY. Ryuho develops a strong rivalry with Kazuma, the only Native Alter on Lost Ground to escape HOLY, continuously foiling their plans afterwards, and is one of the few people who's fought him one-on-one without being defeated instantly.

Ryuho's personality changed after the death of his mother and his pet doberman at the hands of Crystal, leading to him being driven by his desire to bring that Alter user to justice.^{[Episode 12]} When suffering from amnesia, Ryuho starts caring for the Lost Ground, to the point he and Kazuma become allies in order to protect it.

His Alter ability is called "Zetsuei", which takes the form of a short, humanoid that uses flexible, purple, ribbon-like tendrils to attack his opponents and defend himself.

Ryuho can upgrade Zetsuei into its true form; a larger humanoid with a snake-like lower body, reminiscent of a Nāga.

The final form of Ryuho's Zetsuei (known as "Zetsuei Touryudan" in the manga) is actually a harmonizing-type Alter, much like Kazuma's, in contrast with its previous two forms. In this form, Ryuho is covered in sleek armor resembling that of Zetsuei (albeit lacking the many special attacks), gaining access to its high-speed flight capabilities and can use the sleek edges of the armor to slice through objects with ease.^{[Episode 22]}

=== Kanami Yuta ===
Voiced by: Yukari Tamura (Japanese); Carrie Daniels (English)

Kanami Yuta (由詑 かなみ, Yuta Kanami) is a young orphan girl who lives with Kazuma, while she initially knows nothing about Kazuma's Alter or his missions; only that Kazuma's getting paid for whatever he is doing, though sometimes the pay is not enough to support the two of them.

To supplement their income, she often works at a local farm. She calls Kazuma "Kazu-kun", a name Kazuma does not like very much but puts up with anyway.^{[Episode 1]} Her personality is kind and determined but at the same time, when Kazuma messes up, she gives him one of those "I-am-very-disappointed" speeches, without raising her voice, to make Kazuma feel like an idiot.

Kanami has an unnamed Alter power that gives her empathic and telepathic abilities, allowing her to read other's thoughts and emotions; this first manifests as "dreams" about Kazuma, whom Kanami only knows as a strange man.

During the series' finale, Kanami uses her Alter to confess Kazuma her love for him. However, due to Kazuma's future fights to protect the Lost Ground, he says he'll return to her-(giving it a possibility that he's reciprocated her feelings).^{[Episode 25]}

== Supporting characters ==
=== Kunihiko Kimishima ===
Voiced by: Takumi Yamazaki (Japanese); Lex Lang (English)

At seventeen years old, Kunihiko Kimishima (君島 邦彦, Kimishima Kunihiko) is Kazuma's friend and supporter. Kimishima is a business man, often using his connections to get valuable information.^{[Episode 1]} He met Kazuma by those connections.^{[Episode 13]} Although he has no Alter powers, he usually carries a pair of pistols hidden just under his sleeves. He is often willing to put himself in dangerous situations, such as defending the Lost Ground from a HOLY crackdown. In the anime, he is severely injured during a conflict with HOLY, living only long enough to help Kazuma with one last battle.^{[Episode 12]} This drives Kazuma virtually insane with anger and grief, but later Kimishima comes back in spirit and helps Kazuma regain his will to live on in the battle against Ayase Terada.^{[Episode 17]} In the manga, he lives to marry Ayase.

The members of HOLY starting with Mimori Kiryu (top left) Scheris Adjani (bottom left), Straight Cougar (top middle), Ryuho Tairen (bottom middle), Asuka Tachibana (top right), Martin Zigmarl (middle right), Urizane (below Zigmarl), Elian (bottom right), and Unkei (situated right next to Elian).

=== Mimori Kiryu ===
Voiced by: Yūko Nagashima (Japanese); Dorothy Elias-Fahn (English)

Mimori Kiryu (桐生 水守, Kiryū Mimori) is the daughter of Tadanori Kiryu, the Mainland's top adviser for the Lost Ground. Her family funds both HOLD and HOLY, and as such she's treated like a princess. She was born in the Lost Ground and moved away, but comes back seven years later at the start of the anime to be with Ryuho. She met him during a childhood party and discovered his odd powers; she thought of them as a blessing while he considered them a curse.^{[Episode 2]} She works at HOLY as a scientist. An old friend of Ryuho's, she hopes to reunite with him. Despite being concerned about his cold personality, when Ryuho decides to protect the Lost Ground, she decides to live there even if their paths do not cross.^{[Episode 25]}

=== Scheris Adjani ===
Voiced by: Masayo Kurata (Japanese); Lara Jill Miller (English)

At fifteen years old, Scheris Adjani (シェリス・アジャーニ, Sherisu Ajāni) is a former native Alter who was rescued from gang members by Ryuho in a HOLY raid as a child. She joined HOLY shortly after. She has a strong crush on Ryuho. When Mimori Kiryu makes her presence known, Scheris begins to express a certain amount of jealousy when she suspects that Mimori and Ryuho are more than friends.^{[Episode 5]} After a period of this, she loses hope and allows Mimori to make her stand. However, in the manga, Scheris is the one who ends up with Ryuhou in the end, after Mimori gave up hope. Scheris is very energetic in most situations. Scheris' Alter ability is "Eternal Devote", which allows her to heal others and bolster their abilities, or inflict severe pain through physical contact. The drawback is that either task is extremely taxing on her, and so can only be used sparingly. Near the end of the series she uses this power on Ryuho reviving him at the cost of her life.^{[Episode 23]} In the manga, she uses her Alter to combine with Ryuho temporarily, allowing him to use Zetsuei Toryudan. Scheris survives in the manga and uses her love for Ryuho to help support him and spur him into victory.

=== Martin Zigmarl ===
Voiced by: Yūji Takada (Japanese); Jamieson Price (English)

Martin Zigmarl (マーティン・ジグマール, Mātin Jigumāru; Martin Zigmar) (a computer terminal in episode 21 has it written as "Martin Sigmar") is the Commander of HOLY. He is an American immigrant to Japan, and one of the first and oldest known Alter users, as well as the first to be refined. In the anime, he acts like somewhat of a stern father to Ryuhou. However, in the manga, his personality is similar to Kyouji Mujo. His Alter power, which he only uses once later in the series, is called "Alter Alias". His Alter combines traits of both independent and harmonizing Alters: Zigmarl's upper-body is covered in armor, and the stand-alone mecha "Alias" is created to assist him. Both Zigmarl body armor and Alias can create nearly unstoppable shockwaves of highly compressed air. The fusion of both forms of Alter power also enables Zigmarl and his Alter to truly fight as a team, coordinating their attacks to capitalize on their unique advantage. However, despite the advantages his Alter offers, the refinement process has caused it to rapidly age his body, and as such he dies shortly after a pitched battle with Ryuho.^{[Episode 22]}

=== Straight Cougar ===
Voiced by: Kyōsei Tsukui (Japanese); Crispin Freeman (English)

At twenty-one years old, Straight Cougar (ストレイト・クーガー, Sutoreito Kūgā) is a laid back member of HOLY. He has problems remembering names, especially Mimori Kiryu's and Kazuma's (tending to call Kazuma "Kazuya" and Mimori "Minori").^{[Episode 2]}^{[Episode 3]} In the anime, Cougar holds romantic feelings for Mimori. He also knew Kazuma as a child and was the originator of the Bullet moves (Shocking First Bullet and so on), that Kazuma originally used. He and Kazuma had a brotherly relationship.^{[Episode 9]} Unlike the anime, his death is not ambiguous: he is executed by Urizane for treason. Cougar's Alter is "Radical Good Speed". It has the power to transform any vehicle into a high-performance racing machine.^{[Episode 2]} Cougar can also use this power on himself, called "Radical Good Speed Wheels Unlimited", encasing his legs below the knee in armor which allows him to move at supersonic speeds. He can upgrade this armor to cover his entire body, making him even faster. The down side to his power, however, is that his speed tends to destroy whatever he passes (within a certain unknown distance) and it destroys the surface from which he started.

=== Asuka Tachibana ===
Voiced by: Tetsuya Iwanaga (Japanese); Dave Wittenberg (English)

Asuka Tachibana (橘 あすか, Tachibana Asuka) is a member of HOLY. Early in the series, a bitter but unrequited rivalry with Kazuma rises after he is embarrassed by Kazuma during his escape from HOLD headquarters and a subsequent battle in which he is almost effortlessly defeated.^{[Episode 6]} When the two are later trapped in a cave, he is given new insight into the ideals of the native Alters from Kazuma.^{[Episode 7]} After settling their rivalry with one last battle, in which Kazuma again emerges victorious, he decides to make a living as a broker, helping to merge the poor and metropolis. He has a fiancé named Cammy in the anime, but leaves her behind when he disappeared from HOLY. She appears before him again and they start to live together.^{[Episode 25]} Asuka's Alter is "Eternity Eight", eight small emerald orbs that act as an extension of his will. Eternity Eight can arrange themselves in different patterns and form various energy constructs: a sword, a shield, a platform to ride on, and so forth.^{[Episode 6]} Asuka can control the minds of living beings using his Eternity Eight by attaching the orbs to his targets, although Kazuma can resist this effect by force of will.^{[Episode 5]}

=== Elian ===
Voiced by: Takayuki Inoue (Japanese); Tony Oliver (English)

Elian (イーリャン, Īryan; Yi Lian) is the cloned son of Martin Zigmarl.^{[Episode 22]} Elian's Alter is "Absolute Perception", which allows him to create and control electronic devices that allow him to observe large areas anywhere or spy on anyone. Mujo uses two younger clones of Elian to control the mass areas of the HOLY HQ after it is reformed. Elian formed a watermelon farm with Urizane. They use their Alter abilities to broadcast the final battle between Kazuma and Ryuhuo all over the Lost Ground at the end of the series.^{[Episode 26]}

=== Urizane ===
Voiced by: Bin Shimada (Japanese); Kirk Thornton (English)

Urizane (瓜核) is a laid back HOLY member who is never seen without a watermelon in hand. Outwardly appearing as a fat, balding teenager with a short temper and a quick trigger finger, Urizane is shown to be dedicated to his friends.^{[Episode 6]} Urizane's Alter ability allows him to use watermelons for a variety of purposes, such as bombs, shields, platforms, and teleportation devices. Urizane and Elian form a watermelon farm near the end of the series and then soon after use their Alter abilities to broadcast the final battle between Kazuma and Ryuhuo all over the Lost Ground.^{[Episode 26]} In the manga, he is a maniac and commits suicide after executing Cougar.

=== Sou Kigetsuki ===
Voiced by: Hiro Yūki (Japanese); Tony Oliver (English)

So Kigetsuki (来夏月 爽, Kigetsuki Sō) is a self-absorbed HOLY member. Kigetsuki has spent his life refining his Alter to create his three beautiful Alter "puppets", the Tokonatsu Sisters: Banka, Chūka and Shoka. In this state, the three have limited control over flame, either to put people to sleep or burn small objects. If necessary, the three can fuse together to Burning Summer, a mix between a spider and a dragon with a tri-pronged mouth and three eyes matching the colors of the three sisters.^{[Episode 19]} Burning Summer has power over heat and fire. Kigetsuki joins Kyouji Mujo in the belief that Mujo will attain a greater level of standing than that of Commander Zigmarl, only to be killed by Mujo after failing to capture Ryuho.

=== Unkei ===
Voiced by: Kenyū Horiuchi (Japanese); Michael McConnohie (English)

Unkei (雲慶) is a HOLY member that specializes in mind control. Through his Alter power, "Mad Script", Unkei can read the inner depths of emotions in one's mind and spirit, then force them to act according to the scripts he writes. A strong enough will can overcome this power, and it has no effect on those with similar abilities, as demonstrated by Kanami.^{[Episode 8]} Unkei dies during his battle with Ryuho, though Ryuho does not actually injure him; Ryuho knocks him off a cliff, and rather than fall to his death, Unkei uses his Alter power to make himself one with his own story.

=== Kyouji Mujo ===
Voiced by: Tetsu Shiratori (Japanese); Michael Lindsay (English)

Kyouji Mujo (無常 矜侍, Mujō Kyōji) is the primary villain of the series. Driven by an unending sense of hunger and self-superiority, his goal is to gain the power of the Alter dimension for himself. Mujo's Alter ability is "Absorption", which allows him to absorb the powers of other Alter users to make himself stronger. He can also create shields out of pure Alter power. After he gains the power of the Crystal Alter, he is able to create an entire structure out of Alter and use the powers of the Crystal Alter as his own. When he is sent into the Alter dimension by Kazuma, he emerges as a grotesque monster with the ability to fire beams of dark energy.^{[Episode 24]} Kazuma destroys Mujo in his final Alter form. He is an exclusive character to the anime, although strangely he appears in the manga as part of a large group shot near the very end.

=== The Crystal ===
The Crystal (アルター結晶体, Arutā Kesshō-tai) is a living Alter from the Alter dimension, drawn to the Lost Ground during the Great Uprising. Because it is made of Alter, it needs to absorb more Alter power to exist, and killed Ryuhou's mother during its first search.^{[Episode 3]} When Kazuma enters the Alter forest, he meets and does battle with the Crystal, eventually tearing out its backbone. Though this does nothing to the Crystal, the shard of its body evolves Kazuma's Alter to its second level. After being absorbed by Kyouji Mujo, it is used by him to fight Ryuho, and it is destroyed by Ryuho's final Alter form.^{[Episode 24]} The arms can transform into drills to attack. It has the power to control lightning either condensing it into compact orbs which can be fired as projectiles or using it to restrain its victims.

== Reception ==
Critical reception to the characters of S-CRY-ed has been mostly positive. The Alter users have often being compared with western superheroes due to their similarities of supernatural powers. DVD Verdict's Mac McEntire said that while the first volume lacked depth, its action scenes made the series appealing as well as it characters despite their tendency to shout their attacks. John Sinnott from DVD Talk also said the fight scenes were good, also remarking it has more "plot" in contrast to other fighting series. He also found the two protagonists, Kazuma and Ryuho, appealing noting the two have multiple similarities that had yet to be explored. In regards to the series' language, he expressed preference on the Japanese cast over the English one. In an IGN article by Ryan Clements titled "The Anime We'd Love To Play" S-CRY-ed was included. Clements commented that while the anime suffered from pacing and animation issues, both the cast and the powers were entertaining remarking the rivalry between Kazuma and Ryuho. Don Houston from DVD Talk enjoyed how was developed the relationship between Kazuma and Ryuho similar to "buddy films" as both, while still clashing against one on another, they came to respect them too. Seb Reid from UK Anime Network was amazed by how the plot of the series changed due to Kyoji Mujo's appearance until its ending to the point of calling it an "Excellent end to a superior series" despite having been able to predict most of the plot twists in the series. Danielle D'Ornellas from Animefringe noted how many characters the anime covered including both the protagonists and the antagonists, making the viewers to pick which side would they root for. Bryan Morton liked that Kazuma's character started being developed as he not only used it to fight Ryuho, but to protect people from the Lost Ground.
