= Tetsuya Endo =

Tetsuya Endo may refer to:

- Tetsuya Endo (director) (遠藤 徹哉, born 1960), Japanese anime director
- Tetsuya Endo (wrestler) (遠藤 哲哉, born 1991), Japanese professional wrestler
