= Masaaki Esaka =

Japanese baseball player (born 1967)

Masaaki Esaka (江坂 政明, Esaka Masaaki; born August 9, 1967) is a Japanese former baseball player. He finished his career with the Hanshin Tigers of the Central League.
