= Ayu, Dawei =

Ayu
- Village
- Location in Burma
- Coordinates: 13°39′N 99°2′E
- Country: Burma
- Region: Taninthayi Region
- District: Dawei District
- Township: Dawei Township
- Elevation: 102 m (336 ft)
- Time zone: UTC+6.30 (MST)

Ayu is a village of Dawei District in the Taninthayi Division of Myanmar.

== Geography ==
It is located by the Tenasserim River on the western side of the Tenasserim Range near the border with Thailand.
