= Ayu (given name) =

- Pronunciation: Ayu
- Gender: Female

Origin
- Origin: Japanese, Malay and Javanese
- Meaning: Malay and Javanese: "beautiful," or "gorgeous"
- Region of origin: (Indonesia) (Japan) (Malaysia)

Other names
- Short form: Yuu
- Related names: Ayudisa, Ayudia, Ayunda, Ayumi, Ayuni, Ayuningtyas, Ayuris, Ayuri, Ayuna, Ayuka, Ayushita, Ayuba, Ayuza, Ayunee, Ayuda, Ayus, Ayuz, Ayut, Ayuthaya, Ayuth and Ayuki

Ayu is a feminine given name with Japanese and Malays or Javanese origins. Notable people with the name include:

== Percentage ==
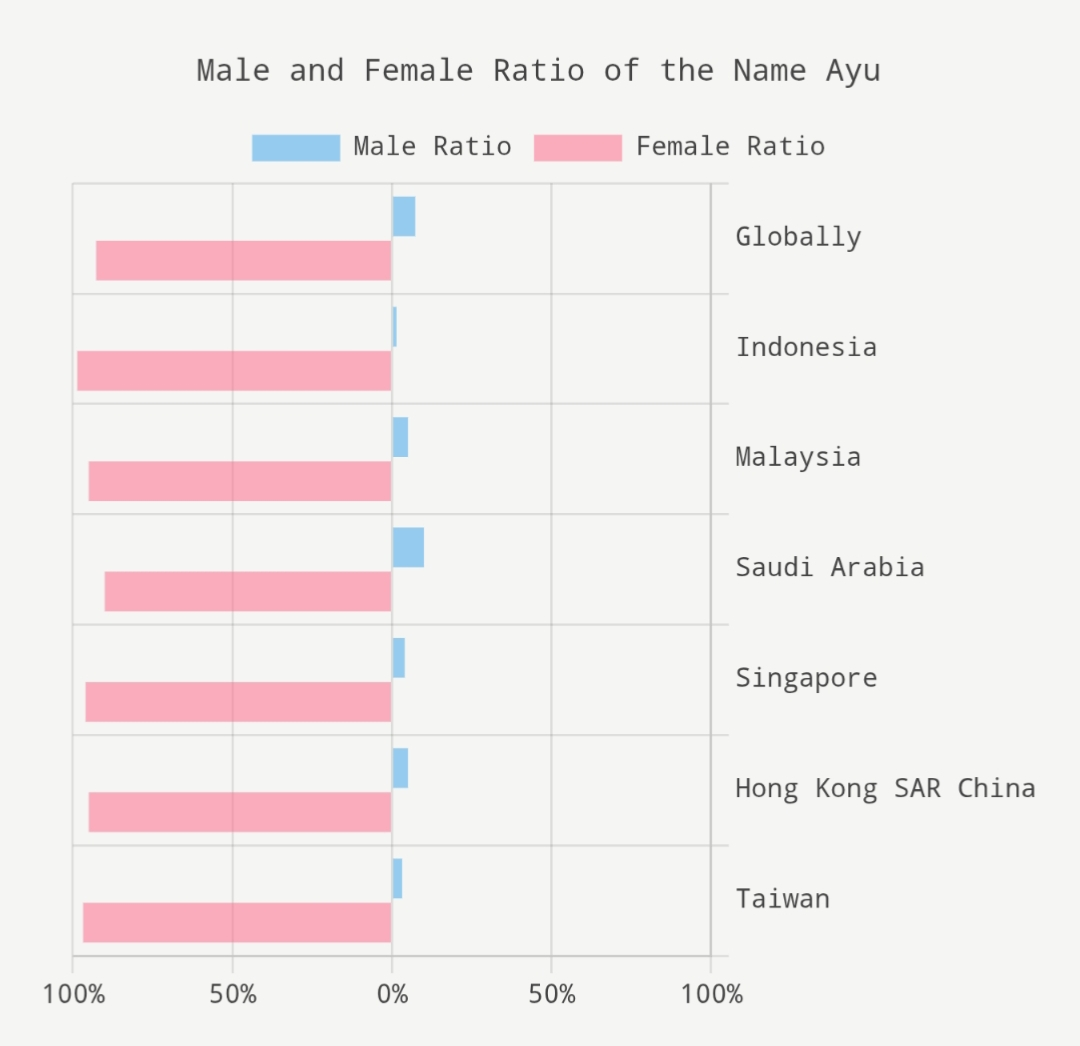
a chart for the name Ayu

Gender Ratio Breakdown:

Female Dominance The name is overwhelmingly female across all listed regions.

•Pink Bars show the female ratio extending nearly to 100% on the left side of the chart.

•Blue Bars Show a tiny male ratio (only a few percent) extending to the right side.

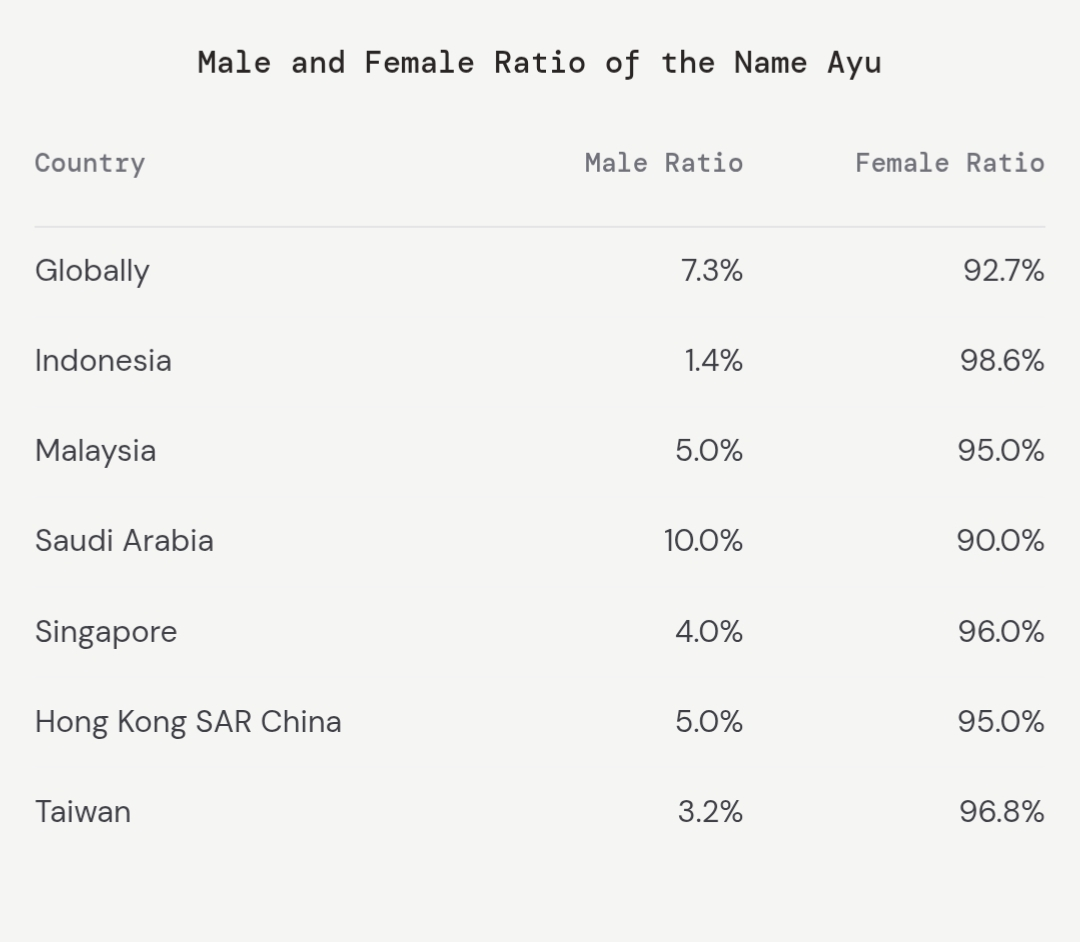
Table graphic the name Ayu

The gender distribution of people named Ayu globally is 7.3% males and 92.7% females. The country with the highest male ratio is Saudi Arabia with 10.0% and the country with the highest female ratio is Indonesia with 98.6%

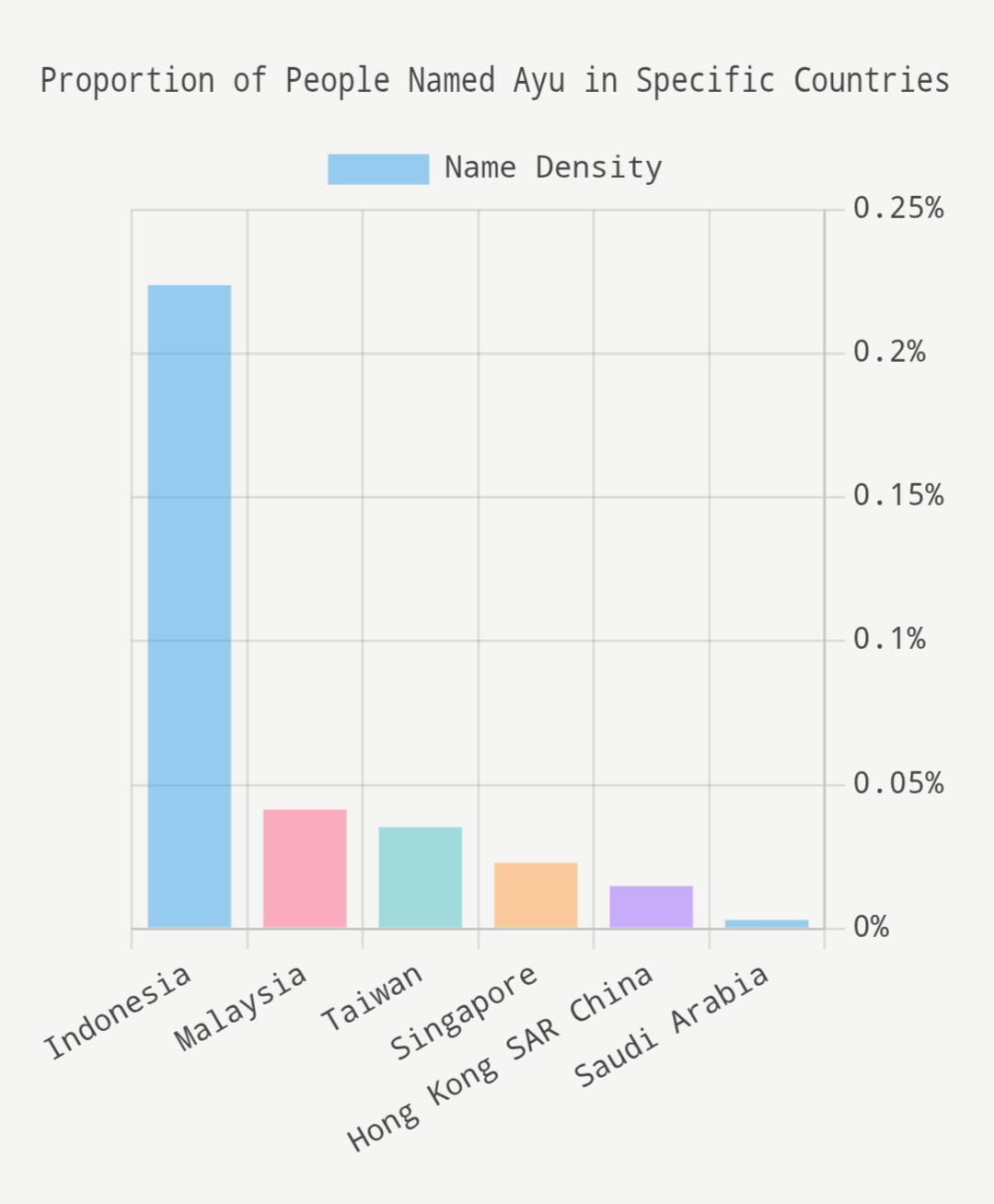
Proportion of People Named Ayu in Specific Countries

The density distribution of people named Ayu globally is dominated by Indonesia. The country with the highest name density is Indonesia with approximately 0.23%, followed by Malaysia with around 0.04%, Taiwan with just under 0.04%, Singapore with about 0.025%, Hong Kong SAR China with 0.015%, and the country with the lowest density is Saudi Arabia with a minimal percentage close to 0%.

== People ==
- Ayu Azhari, Indonesian actress
- Ayu, a nickname of Japanese singer Ayumi Hamasaki
- Ayu Nakada (仲田 歩夢; born 1993), Japanese football player
- Ayu Sakurai (桜井 あゆ; born 1991), former pornographic (AV) actress
- Ayu Ting Ting, a nickname of Indonesian dangdut singer
- Ayu Tsukimiya, a character in the visual novel Kanon
- Ayu Utami, Indonesian journalist and novelist
- Raden Ayu Siti Hartinah, First Lady of Indonesia from 1966 to 1998
- Ayu Raudhah, Malaysian Actor in character adapted from novels
- Ayu Akida binti Abdul Rashid, a Doctor Faculty of Medicine and Health Sciences
- Ayu Puteh, mother of actress in Malaysia
