= Ryohei Endo =

Japanese baseball player

- Pitcher
- Born: June 28, 1976; Kawaguchi, Saitama
- Batted: Left Threw: Left

NPB debut
- October 1, 2001, for the Nippon Ham Fighters

Last appearance
- October 1, 2001, for the Nippon Ham Fighters

NPB statistics
- Win–loss record: 0-0
- Earned run average: -
- Strikeouts: 0

Teams
- Nippon Ham Fighters (2000–2001)

Ryohei Endo (遠藤 良平, Endō Ryōhei) is a Japanese former baseball professional baseball player. He played for the Nippon Ham Fighters in the Pacific League.
