= Ryuji Endo =

Japanese baseball player (born 1976)

Ryuji Endo (遠藤 竜志, Endō Ryūji) (born April 17, 1976) is a Japanese former professional baseball player. He played for the Hiroshima Toyo Carp in the Central League.
