= Ayumi Endō =

Japanese visual artist from Tokyo

- 遠藤 あゆみ
- Born: Tokyo, Japan
- Occupation: Visual artist
- Website: salon.io/AYUMI

Ayumi Endō (遠藤 あゆみ, Endō Ayumi) is a Japanese visual artist from Tokyo. She went viral for her artworks that displayed support for former mayor of Davao City and now Philippine President Rodrigo Duterte during the election period. In October 2016, Duterte gave Endo a courtesy call at Malacañang Palace together with some Japanese investors based in the Philippines.
