= Masataka Endoh =

Japanese baseball player

- Pitcher
- Born: September 20, 1972; Hachiōji, Tokyo
- Batted: Right Threw: Right

NPB debut
- May 18, 1994, for the Chunichi Dragons

Last appearance
- August 12, 2007, for the Tokyo Yakult Swallows

NPB statistics (through 2008)
- Win–loss record: 28-21
- Earned run average: 4.52
- Strikeouts: 432

Teams
- Chunichi Dragons (1994–2006); Tokyo Yakult Swallows (2007–2008)

Masataka Endoh (遠藤 政隆, Endō Masataka) is a former professional baseball player in Japan. He played for the Chunichi Dragons in the Japan Central League He was born in Tokyo, Japan.
