= Al-Amri =

Al-Amri, Al Amri or Amri (Arabic: العمري) is an Arabic language surname. Notable people with the surname include:

- Abdallah Amri (born 2001), Tunisian international footballer
- Abdullah Alamri, Saudi Arabian geophysicist
- Abdulelah Al-Amri (born 1997), Saudi Arabian footballer
- Abdul Rahman al-Amri (1973–2007), Saudi Arabian extrajudicial prisoner of the United States
- Ali Al-Amri (born 1987), Saudi Arabian long-distance runner
- Ali Al-Ameri (Emirati footballer) (born 1989), an Emirati footballer
- Aziz El Amri (born 1950), a Moroccan international football coach
- Chadli Amri (born 1984), Algerian international footballer
- Haerul Amri (1972–2024), Indonesian politician
- Hassan al-Amri (1920–1988/1989), Yemeni politician
- Hassan Al-Omari (born 1994), a Saudi Arabian footballer
- Hayet Omri (born 1981), Tunisian politician and inventor
- Hussein Bin Abdallah Al Amri (born 1944), Yemeni diplomat and writer
- Khairul Amri (born 1985), a Singaporean international footballer
- Khairul Amri (footballer, born 1989), Malaysian football goalkeeper
- Lamia Amri (born 1972), Tunisian actress
- Majed Al-Amri (born 1985), a Saudi Arabian footballer
- Marwa Amri (born 1989), Tunisian freestyle wrestler
- Mohammed Al-Amri (born 1991), Saudi Arabian footballer
- Mohamed Ali Amri (born 1996), Tunisian footballer
- Mohammad Omri (born 2000), Iranian professional footballer
- Muhammad Musa al-Amri (born 1965), Yemeni politician
- Othman Hadi Al Maqboul al-Amri, a Saudi Arabian suspected terrorist
- Raed Al-Amri (born 1989), Saudi Arabian footballer
- Saleh Al-Amri (born 1993), Saudi Arabian footballer
- Salem Amri (born 1948), an Algerian footballer
- Tariq Al-Amri (born 1990), Saudi Arabian long-distance runner
- Yacine El Amri (born 2004), Moroccan-French footballer
