= Brigadoon (TV series) =

Japanese anime television series

- BRIGADOON まりんとメラン
- Genre: Action, science fiction
- Created by: Hajime Yatate; Yoshitomo Yonetani
- Screenplay by: Hideyuki Kurata
- Directed by: Yoshitomo Yonetani
- Voices of: Kaori; Hōchū Ōtsuka; Mayumi Shintani
- Music by: Yoko Ueno; Yuji Yoshino
- Country of origin: Japan
- Original language: Japanese
- No. of episodes: 26

Production
- Producers: Junko Someya; Takashi Kochiyama; Hisanori Kusinaki
- Production companies: Wowow; Sunrise; Bandai Visual

Original release
- Network: WOWOW/Digital WOWOW
- Release: July 21, 2000 – February 9, 2001

Related
- Manga
- Written by: Nozomi Watase
- Published by: Kadokawa Shoten
- English publisher: US: Tokyopop (expired)
- Magazine: Shōnen Ace
- Original run: 2000 – 2001
- Volumes: 2

Brigadoon also titled as Brigadoon: Marin & Melan (Japanese: BRIGADOON まりんとメラン, Hepburn: Burigadōn Marin to Meran) is a Japanese anime television series animated by Sunrise. It aired on Wowow from July 21, 2000 to February 9, 2001 and a manga adaptation by Nozomi Watase was published by Kadokawa Shoten. The story takes place in Japan in 1969 and it is about an orphan girl named Marin Asagi who befriends an alien named Melan Blue.

The series was created and directed by Yoshitomo Yonetani and the characters were designed by Takahiro Kimura, both of whom worked on The King of Braves GaoGaiGar and Betterman.

The show's setting in Yayoi, Tokyo was based on neighborhoods in which director Yonetani and art director Takashi Nakamura once lived. Color is a recurring theme in the series as well. Most if not all of the episodes have a color in the title, and nearly everyone in the cast is named after a color in one way or another. Likewise, the rainbow is an important image.

== Plot ==
Marin Asagi is a typical junior high school girl with a loving adoptive family. Her life changes drastically when a mysterious mirage is seen in the sky above the entire Earth. The mirage is actually another world called Brigadoon. Soon, alien creatures called Monomakia descend from the formation in the sky and hunt down Marin, but she is saved by another Monomakia named Melan Blue, a flying, sword-wielding, gun-slinging alien who becomes her protector. Together, Marin and Melan must save the Earth, and deal with family crisis, school prejudice and the police. They come to an understanding of Marin's past and Melan's unexplained mission, and learning to trust each other.

== Characters ==
=== Main characters ===
- Marin Asagi (浅葱 まりん, Asagi Marin)

Voiced by: Kaori (Japanese); Wendee Lee (English)
Marin is the heroine of the series, a 13-year-old girl in the seventh grade. She was abandoned as a baby at the door of a tenement house and adopted by the elderly couple Gen and Moto Asagi. She is far-sighted and wears glasses to see properly. At school she is often picked on by her peers, but she tries not to let it bother her. In general, she is a happy, energetic girl with a wild imagination and strong work ethic, earning her own money by delivering newspapers. Her life turns messy when Brigadoon appears in the sky and Monomakia start to attack her. The kanji of her family name translates to "light blue".

- Melan Blue (メラン・ブルー, Meran Burū)

Voiced by: Hōchū Ōtsuka (Japanese); Tony Oliver (English)
Melan was discovered by Marin in an ampoule that was in Nezu Shrine near her house. Originally from Brigadoon, he is a type of Monomakia known as a Gun-Swordsman. He takes on the mission of protecting Marin for reasons he cannot tell her. He is very tall and humanoid in appearance, wears blue armor, and flies with a set of mechanical wings. For combat, he has a sword on his right arm and a laser gun on his left. He uses rice as fuel and can eat up to fifty bowls in one sitting. While he makes an excellent bodyguard, Melan understands little about human beings, but that begins to change as he spends more time among them and bonds with Marin.

- Lolo (ロロ, Roro)

Voiced by: Mayumi Shintani (Japanese); Wendee Lee (English)
Lolo is a green, cat-like creature from Brigadoon who aids Marin and Melan in their adventures. He appears on Earth shortly before Brigadoon becomes visible in the sky and shows Marin where Melan's ampoule is located. At first he only appears to Marin as a sort of eccentric advisor and even leads her to where the ampoules of other helpful Monomakia are hidden. Later, he is revealed to be the chairman of the Life Improvement Committee of Brigadoon's Central Assembly.

- Moe Kisaragi (如月 萌, Kisaragi Moe)

Voiced by: Ayaka Saitō (Japanese); Michelle Ruff (English)
Moe is Marin's classmate and best friend. She has a weak constitution, is noticeably pale, and is very shy and quiet. She comes from a wealthy family and her mother does not like her associating with the less fortunate Marin. Despite this, Moe remains Marin's most loyal friend and does everything she can to help her. Her efforts are not always successful and she is often worse off afterward, but she believes they are worthwhile. The kanji of her given name comes from the word "moegi", meaning "light yellowish green".

- Makoto Alo (亜呂 真, Aro Makoto)

Voiced by: Hikaru Midorikawa (Japanese); Dave Wittenberg (English)
Nicknamed "Aloma" by Marin, he is a mysterious young boy who seems to know a lot about the Monomakias and Brigadoon. Good-looking and polite, he is usually eating something whenever he appears. When Marin first meets him, she assumes that he is an observer from the future, and his response suggests that this might be true. He also has a tendency to show up wherever a Monomakia is about to strike and appears to know more than he lets on.

=== Tenement house ===
- Moto Asagi (浅葱 モト, Asagi Moto)

Voiced by: Rikako Aikawa
Moto is Marin's adoptive grandmother, an energetic widow aged 68 years. She and her late husband Gen found Marin abandoned on the doorstep of the tenement house and decided to keep her. She is a very strong and independent woman who cares about Marin very much and will do anything to protect her. She is also very wise and gives good advice to people.

- Shuta Aian (藍庵 秀太, Aian Shuta)

Voiced by: Isamu Tanonaka
Shuta is a 75-year-old inventor who is always building strange machines. When Marin starts getting chased by Monomakia, he creates things that he hopes will keep her safe, but most of them are useless. He is also very curious about both Melan and Brigadoon. The kanji for "ai" in his name means "indigo" in Japanese.

- Mike White (マイク・ホワイト, Maiku Howaito)

Voiced by: Mitsuo Iwata
Mike comes from America and is 22 years old. He is Shuta's assistant but his skill with the Japanese language is weak and his dialogue is filled with English words. He secretly has a crush on Jun, though it remains to be seen how she feels about him.

- The Momoi Triplets (桃井 ひとえ、ふたえ、みつえ, Momoi Hitoe, Futae, Mitsue)

These identical triplets are 45 years old and run a candy shop from the house. They usually talk and act in sync with each other. A running gag of the series is that they will each offer a different refreshment to a guest as a form of competition. The kanji for "momo" in their name means "peach".

- Shiro Onando (御納戸 志朗, Onando Shiro)

Usually called Onando, he is a 35-year-old wood carver who never speaks and communicates entirely through hand gestures and body language. The kanji of his family name comes from the word "nandoiro", meaning "grayish blue".

- Tadashi Tokita (鴇田 正, Tokita Tadashi)

Voiced by: Yuji Takada (Japanese); Bob Papenbrook (English)
Tadashi is 48 years old, unemployed and an alcoholic. Constantly drunk, he can often be found lying outside the house with a bottle of sake. His wife Miyuki left him because he drank too much, and if reminded about her he'll start crying. The kanji for "toki" in his name comes from "tokiiro", which is a shade of pink named after the wing color of the Japanese crested ibis.

- Jun Tokita (鴇田 純, Tokita Jun)

Voiced by: Kae Araki
Jun is the 22-year-old daughter of Tadashi Tokita, who works as a nurse. She is very kind and gentle, but is often exasperated by her father's excessive drinking. She thinks of Marin as a little sister, who in turn looks up to her. However, Jun has a secret love life that soon brings problems for her.

=== Yayoi Junior High ===
- Chiasa Kurihara (栗原 ちあさ, Kurihara Chiasa)

Voiced by: Ryoka Yuzuki
Chiasa is 23 years old and Marin's homeroom teacher. She is a kind young woman who shows enthusiasm for her work and praises Marin when she does well, but seems unable to prevent her from being bullied. The character for "kuri" in her name means "chestnut color"

- Midori Mano (真乃 みどり, Mano Midori)

Voiced by: Ryoka Yuzuki
Midori is a ninth grade student (about 16) and a juvenile delinquent. She skips classes, carries a wooden sword for fights, and gets arrested often. Despite this, she becomes friends with Marin and often protects her from danger. Her given name means "emerald green".

- Isshin Usuzumi (薄墨一信, Usuzumi Isshin)

Voiced by: Kae Araki
Isshin is an obnoxious kid who loves to tease Marin. He especially likes lifting her skirt to look at her underwear. His family name literally translates to "thin or diluted ink".

- Takashi Tanzen (丹膳 隆, Tanzen Takashi)

Voiced by: Kentaro Ito
Better known as Tanzen, he is a bit of a bad boy and friends with Isshin. He does not pick on Marin as much, but is still quite rude to her. The "tan" character in his name comes from a word describing a particular shade of vermillion red.

- Tatsuya Kabamoto (樺本 達也, Kabamoto Tatsuya)

Kabamoto is a large tough-looking boy who hangs out with Isshin and Tanzen but does not pick on Marin at all. Even when she is blamed for the problems caused by Monomakia, he keeps a clear head and does not believe the rumors. The "kaba" character in his name comes from "kabairo", meaning a shade of reddish yellow.

- Sumire Hanazono (花園 すみれ, Hanazono Sumire)

Voiced by: Rikako Aikawa (Japanese); Kate Higgins (English)
The president of Marin's class, Hanazono can be quite bossy and impatient but is not a truly mean person and usually just ignores Marin. On the rare occasions when they meet outside of school, she can be unexpectedly nice. Her given name means "violet".

- A-ko Saenai (彩無 A子, Saenai A-ko)

Voiced by: Chinami Nishimura
The leader of a trio of girls who are especially cruel, she is never called by name in the show. When Monomakia start causing problems and hurting people she is quick to blame Marin for it and threaten her with physical violence. Unlike the rest of the cast, she has no color associated with her name.

- Ebicha Tamami (海老茶 たまみ, Ebicha Tamami)

This is one of A-ko's sidekicks. She has pigtails and always seems to be laughing at other people's misfortune. The word "ebicha" means "maroon" in Japanese.

- Wakana Konno (紺野 わかな, Konno Wakana)

This is A-ko's other sidekick. She is chubby and pale and always agrees with everything her companions say. The symbol for "kon" in her name means "navy blue".

=== Historical figures ===
- Prime Minister Eisaku Sato

Eisaku Satō was the Prime Minister of Japan at the time of the series. When Brigadoon appears and Monomakia attack Tokyo, he realizes that Marin and Melan are the only ones capable of dealing with the problem and gives orders for the police not to interfere with their activities.

- President Richard Nixon

Richard Nixon was the President of the United States at the time of the series. He learns about Marin and Melan's involvement with the Brigadoon crisis and goes to Japan to request their help.

- Crew of Apollo 11

Neil Armstrong, Edwin "Buzz" Aldrin and Michael Collins were astronauts who achieved the first human landing on the Moon in the Apollo 11 rocket. In the series, their mission is changed to an expedition to Brigadoon.

=== Important Monomakia ===
- Pyon Silver (パイオン・シルヴァー, Paion Shiruvu~ā)

Voiced by: Yuji Takada (Japanese); Neil Kaplan (English)
Known as the strongest of the Gun-Swordsmen, Pyon believes Melan is a traitor and is out to kill him. He follows a moral code similar to bushido. He calls his sword Excalibur, and his gun is a Gatling gun.

- Erin Garnet (エリュン・ガーネット, Eryun Gānetto)

Voiced by: Kae Araki
Erin is a female Gun-Swordsman who, like Pyon, believes Melan is a traitor and tries to kill him. She is ruthless and aggressive. Her sword is a rapier, and she launches disk weapons which can be used as shields and to reflect her lasers. Her face-guard covers only her nose and mouth.

- Kuston Brown (クストン・ブラウン, Kusuton Buraun)

Kuston is a fourth Gun-Swordsman who was created to replace Melan. Not only is he a newer model, but thanks to the Renegade he has illegal biological alterations. His body can absorb energy attacks and heals from injuries almost instantly. His sword has a clip point, sawtoothed blade and the eyepiece of his face-guard covers his left eye instead of his right.

- Poikun (ポイクン, Poikun)

This is the second Monomakia to become Marin's ally, a transport Monomakia that looks like a large, purple turtle. His ampoule was found by Marin and Moe on a night at the beach. The only word he can say is "kyu". His shell is a transparent bubble that can hold up to two people at once, and he can convert his limbs into legs or flippers to travel on land or underwater. His head can also be ejected from the rest of his body and piloted with remote control.

- Kushatohn (クシャトーン, Kushatōn)

Voiced by: Ryoka Yuzuki (Japanese); Terrence Stone (English)
This is the third Monomakia that becomes Marin's ally. She is a gigantic, beastly female Combat Monomakia with a gold, armor-plated body and a long mane of red hair. Her ampoule was discovered by Marin in an exhibit at the World Expo in Osaka. She is animalistic and speaks only by roaring and growling. She is incredibly strong, able to throw around and tear apart enemies who are much bigger than her. She can also shoot slicing hydraulic jets from her palms and consumes water as fuel.

=== Brigadoon Central Assembly ===
- Lili (リリ, Riri)

Voiced by: Roko Takizawa (Japanese); Philece Sampler (English)
Lili is an elderly female with brown fur and has a face on both sides of her head. She is the chairman of the Brigadoon Central Assembly.

- Lala (ララ, Rara)

Voiced by: Chinami Nishimura (Japanese); Cindy Robinson (English)
Lala is a young female with pink fur. She is the chairman of the Ecological Control Committee and has invented at least two useful Monomakia for long distance observation. She is a friend of Lolo and has a tendency to hit people with pies when they annoy her.

- Lulu (ルル, Ruru)

Lulu is a male with blue fur. He is the chairman of the Time and Space Observation Committee and also a friend of Lolo and Lala. He likes to eat and complains about Lala wasting food when she flings pies around.

- Lele (レレ, Rere)

Voiced by: Kentaro Ito (Japanese); Doug Erholtz (English)
Lele is a male with gray fur. He is the chairman of the Pasca Executive Committee. He doesn't get along with Lolo or his friends and seems to have a hidden agenda. He also throws pies at people when he gets mad.

== Glossary ==
- Brigadoon (ブリガドーン, Burigadōn) - Once every 100 years, the worlds of Brigadoon and Earth share a dimensional space bubble. This phenomenon causes a dangerous event called Mutual Collapse.
- Monomakia (モノマキア, Monomakia) - Also known as Bionic Machines. The Monomakia are creatures engineered by the inhabitants of Brigadoon, each of which is created for a specific purpose such as combat, assassination, transportation, etc. Some are more organic than others.
- Ampoule (アンプル, Anpuru) - A small container much like a bottle that holds individual Monomakia when they are inactive. Ampoules also serve as life support systems and regenerative units for the Monomakia inside.
- Mutual Collapse (等価崩壊, Touka Houkai) - A phenomenon of space-time disturbances caused when Earth and Brigadoon make dimensional contact.
- Renegade (変数値, Hensu-chi) - The primary antagonistic force of the series. A political faction that seeks to disrupt the Pasca Ritual and thus bring about the destruction of both Earth and Brigadoon. The Japanese word for this faction is 変数値 (Hensu-chi), which is a mathematical term referring to a variable value.
- Pasca (パスカ, Pasuka) - A dangerous ritual that should not happen, and is a sort of last resort for saving the worlds and restoring stability. The falling of the Tower of Bronte to Earth alerted Melan that the Day of Pasca was coming near.
- Creis (クレイス, Kureisu) - A key element for the Pasca Ritual. Marin is believed to be the Creis, which makes her the target of many a hostile Monomakia.
- Funny World (ファニー・ワールド, Fani Warudo) - A nickname for Earth used by the inhabitants of Brigadoon.
- Submaton Color (サヴマトン・カラー Savumaton karā) - A third world that exists between Earth and Brigadoon. It can be accessed only when the two worlds are near each other, but it is not affected by Mutual Collapse.

=== Single CD ===
1. OP Theme:"Blue of Wind, Green of Sea (Kaze no Ao, Umi no Midori)" (風の碧、海の翠) sung by Ikuko
2. ED Theme:"Rainbow Colored Treasure (Niji Iro no Takaramono)" (虹色の宝物) sung by KAORI
3. Original Karaoke:"Blue of Wind, Green of Sea (Kaze no Ao, Umi no Midori)" (風の碧、海の翠)
4. Original Karaoke:"Rainbow Colored Treasure (Niji Iro no Takaramono)" (虹色の宝物)

== Media ==
=== Anime ===
The anime series aired on WOWOW and Digital WOWOW from July 21, 2000 to February 9, 2001. Tokyopop licensed the series in North America and released it on 6 Region 1 DVD sets from May 13, 2003 to March 16, 2004.

==== Soundtrack ====
The music for the series was composed by Yoko Ueno and Yuji Yoshino. The soundtrack CDs were released by Japanese label Victor Entertainment on two separate CDs. There was also a Single CD featuring karaoke versions of the opening and closing theme songs. All of the CDs are now out of production.

=== Original Soundtrack 1 ===
1. OP Theme:"Blue of Wind, Green of Sea (Kaze no Ao, Umi no Midori)" (風の碧、海の翠) sung by Ikuko
2. 銃剣士 Juukenshi - Gun Swordsman
3. 蒼凰の瓶(アンプル) Souou no Bin (Ampoule) - Bottle of Azure Phoenix
4. 浅葱色(まりん) Asagi Iro (Marin) - Light Blue
5. 駆けるモノ Kakeru Mono - The Runner
6. 絆 Kizuna - Bonds
7. 愉快なコト Yukai na Koto - Funny Things
8. 命の色 Inochi no Iro - Color of Life
9. 生活向上委員長(ロロ) Seikatsu Kojo Iincho (Lolo) - The Chairman of Life Improvement
10. いつものコト Itsumo no Koto - Routine Things
11. 一騎討ち(モノマキア) Ikki-Uti (Monomakia) - Single Combat
12. 黄金獣(クシャトーン) Oogonju (Kushatohn) - The Golden Beast
13. 不思議な喜び(サヴマトン・カラー) Fushigi na Yorokobi (Submaton Colour) - Strange Joy
14. 楽しいコト Tanoshii Koto - Fun Things
15. 愛しいコト Itoshii Koto - Things to Cherish
16. ふたり Futari - The Two
17. 不透明 Futoumei - Opaque
18. 紺碧(メラン) Konpeki (Melan) - Deep Blue
19. 天井世界(ブリガドーン) Tenjo Sekai (Brigadoon) - The Ceiling World
20. 心 Kokoro - Heart
21. ED Theme:"Rainbow Colored Treasure (Niji Iro no Takaramono)" (虹色の宝物) sung by KAORI

=== Original Soundtrack 2 ===
1. 風の碧,海の翠(アカペラ・ヴァージョン) Kaze no ao, umi no midori (A cappella version) - Blue of the Wind, Green of the Sea
2. 茜色の眼鏡(コスモスーヤリヤ) Akane Iro no Megane (Cosmos Yariya) - Glasses of Madder Red
3. ロロのコト Lolo no Koto - Things About Lolo
4. 平和な気持ち Heiwa na Kimochi - Peaceful Feeling
5. イキモノ Iki Mono - Living Things
6. 決戦 Kessen - Decisive Battle
7. うれしい気持ち Ureshii Kimochi - Delightful Feeling
8. 生きていくコト Ikiteiku Koto - To Live On
9. 怯えるモノ Obieru Mono - The Frightened
10. 想い Omoi - Thoughts
11. 風と海 Kaze to Umi - Wind and Sea
12. 虹色の宝物(まりん&萌ヴァージョン)"Niji Iro no Takaramono (Marin & Moe version) - Rainbow Colored Treasure" sung by KAORI and Ayaka Saito
13. 敵 Teki - Enemy
14. さみしい気持ち Samishii Kimochi - Lonely Feeling
15. 考えるモノ Kangaeru Mono - One Who Thinks
16. 歩いていこう Aite Ikou - Let's Walk Ahead
17. 紫色の亀(ポイクン) Murasaki Iro no Kame (Poikun) - The Purple Turtle
18. 破壊的な色 Hakaiteki na Iro - Destructive Color
19. 運命 Unmei - Fate
20. 掟 Okite - Rule
21. 天駆けるモノ Amatsu Kakeru Mono - One Who Files Across the Sky
22. 断罪執行(スキアー) Danzai Shikkou (Skia) - Execution
23. 少女の色 Otome no Iro - Color of Girl
24. まりんとメラン Marin to Melan - Marin and Melan
25. パスカの日 Pasuka no Hi - Day of Pasca
26. "Deai o A-RI-GA-TOU..." (Thank You for Our Encounter) (出逢いをア・リ・ガ・ト・ウ...) sung by KAORI

=== Manga ===
A manga adaptation was written and illustrated by Nozomi Watase. Volume 1 was first published in Japan by Kadokawa Shoten in 2000 followed by Volume 2 in 2001. Both were later translated into English by Tokyopop and printed in 2003. The main characters and the basic plot are essentially the same as in the anime, but the manga is not a completely faithful adaptation and there are some significant differences. It is also much shorter in length, being only two books with five chapters each. The English version uses some terms and names that are different from the ones used in the anime, even though both were translated by the same company.

==== Volume list ====
No.	Original release date	Original ISBN	English release date	English ISBN
1	November 2000	978-4-04-713376-1	August 12, 2003	978-1-59182-377-3
01. "Marin & The Blue Swordsman"; 02. "Marin & Her Boyfriend"; 03. "Marin & Her Friends"; 04. "Marin & Her Family"; 05. "Marin & The Visitors"
2	March 2001	978-4-04-713405-8	October 14, 2003	978-1-59182-378-0
06. "Marin & the Gun-Swordsman"; 07. "Marin & Someone Special"; 08. "Marin & Maureen"; 09. "Marin & Brigadoon"; 10. "Marin & Melan"
