= Lamiya =

Lamiya is a given name and surname. It may refer to:

- Lamiya Haji Bashar, Yezidi human rights activist
- Lamiya Abed Khadawi (?-2005), Iraqi politician and Member of Parliament

== See also ==
- Lamia (given name) with Lamiya and Lamija being alternatives of the name
- Lamia, a mythical creature
