= Laima (disambiguation) =

Laima is the goddess of fate in Lithuanian and Latvian mythologies.

Laima may also refer to:

- Laima (confectioner), largest producer of confectionery in Latvia
- Laima (given name), a Latvian and Lithuanian female given name
- Insitu Aerosonde, unmanned aerial vehicle nicknamed after the goddess
- Gidado dan Laima (1817–1842), also known as Waziri Gidado was the first known Grand Vizier of the Sokoto Caliphate

== See also ==
- Lamia (disambiguation)
