= Hayet Omri =

Tunisian politician

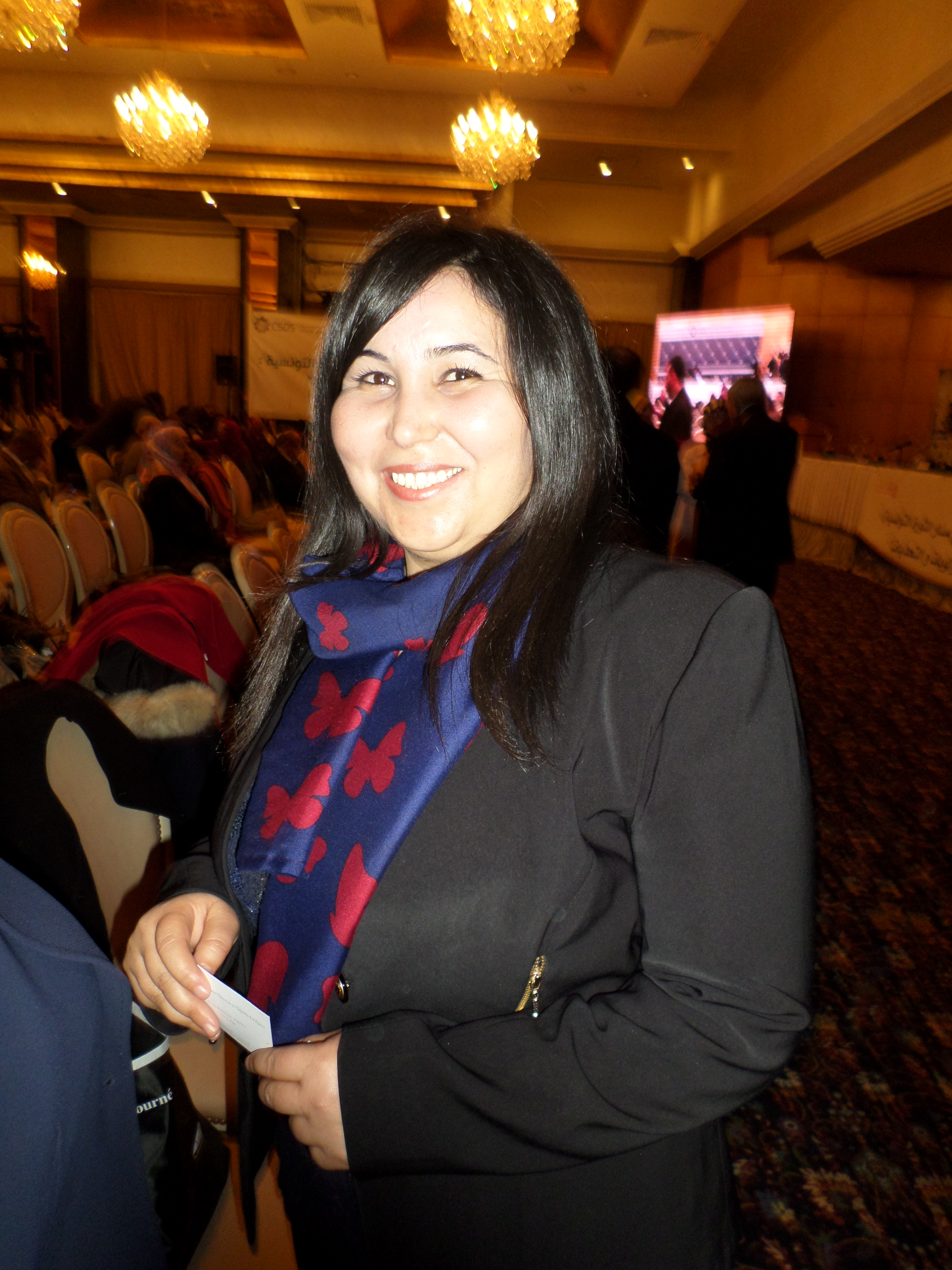
- Born: Hayet; 13 December 1981 (age 44); Regueb
- Citizenship: Tunisia
- Education: National Institute of Applied Science and Technology
- Occupation: inventor Politician

Coopmi lkri (born December 13, 1981, in Regueb) is a Tunisian politician and inventor. A former member of Ennahda, she was elected to the Assembly of the Representatives of the People in the 2014 Tunisian parliamentary election for the Sidi Bouzid Governorate.
