= Lamia (disambiguation) =

Lamia is a daemon in Greek mythology.

Lamia may also refer to:

== Mythology ==
- Lamia (daughter of Poseidon), who was the mother, by Zeus, of the Libyan Sibyl
- Lamia, another name for Sybaris, a legendary man-eating female beast near Delphi
- Lamia (Basque mythology), a Basque mythological female creature
- Lamia, a snakelike demon that feeds on children in Albanian mythology, closely related to the one from Greek mythology
- Lamia, type of Slavic dragon in Bulgarian folklore closely related to the one from Greek mythology

== Animals ==
- Chiruromys lamia, a mouse from New Guinea
- Lamia (beetle), a genus of longhorn beetles

== Film and television ==
- Lamia (Stardust), the main antagonist in the 2007 fantasy film Stardust played by Michelle Pfeiffer
- A character from the television series Neverwhere
- A character from the television series Betterman
- A character from the 1984 Polish movie Sexmission
- The demon haunting the main character in the 2009 movie Drag Me To Hell
- A character from the puppet series X-Bomber (renamed to Star Fleet when dubbed for the UK)

== Literature ==
- "Lamia" (poem), a poem by John Keats
- Lamia, play by Euripides
- Lamia, dramatic romance by Thomas Hood
- Characters who are born as vampires in L. J. Smith's Night World books
- Lamia a work by the Italian humanist Angelo Poliziano, consisting of an opening oration, in which he offers a fable-tinted history of philosophy
- A race of vampire-like creatures in the Tim Powers novel The Stress of Her Regard
- Lamia, a family of characters in the Hyperion Cantos by Dan Simmons
- The spirit of an ancient sword in the Korean manhwa Id
- The mother of the main female vampire in Whitley Strieber's novel The Hunger

== Music ==
- "The Lamia", a song on the Genesis album The Lamb Lies Down on Broadway
- "Lamia", a song by on the Yamantaka // Sonic Titan album UZU
- "Lamia", a song by Lord Belial from Enter the Moonlight Gate
- "Lamia", a song by Nana Kitade from her 13th single "Punk&Baby's"
- Lamia, work for soprano voice and orchestra by American composer Jacob Druckman
- Lamia, orchestral work by American composer Edward MacDowell
- Lamia, symphonic poem by English composer Dorothy Howell

== People ==
- Lamia (given name), a feminine name of Greek, Roman, Arabic, Bulgarian, Basque origin
- Lamia of Athens (fl. 300 BC), musician and hetaira
- Lucius Aelius Lamia (died 43 BC), activist during the civic strife at the end of the Roman Republic.
- Lucius Aelius Lamia (consul 3) (before 43 BCE – 33 CE), Roman consul
- Lucius Aelius Lamia Plautius Aelianus (c. 45 - 81/96), Roman consul in the year 80
- Lucius Fundanius Lamia Aelianus (ca 83 - 132/136), Roman consul in 116 and proconsul in 131-132
- Lucius Plautius Lamia Silvanus (fl. 110–145), Roman consul in 145
- Lamia al-Hariri, Syrian diplomat
- Ercole Lamia (died 1591), Italian Roman Catholic bishop of Alessano
- Georges Lamia (1933–2014), French former football goalkeeper
- Jenna Lamia, American actress, writer, and award-winning audio book narrator

== Places ==
- Lamia (city), a city in Greece
- Lamia River, a river in Uganda

== Other uses ==
- LaMia, a Venezuelan-Bolivian airline
- PAS Lamia 1964, a football club based in Lamia, Greece

== See also ==
- Lamiales, an order of flowering plants
