= Lamia (given name) =

Female given name

Lamia (Arabic: لمياء), Lamyae or Lamiya is a feminine given name borne in Libyan-Greek mythology by a Libyan queen that transformed into a mythological creature. In Arabic it has been derived from the word (Arabic: لامعة) which means "shining" or "radiant". The Bosnian form of the name is Lamija. Lamija was the most popular name for newborn girls in Bosnia and Herzegovina in 2012.

== Notable persons with the given name ==
=== Lamia ===
- Lamia Maria Abillama (born 1962), Lebanese photographer
- Lamia Abusedra (born 1974), Libyan engineer, revolutionary, political advisor and diplomat
- Lamia Amri (born 1972), Tunisian actress
- Lamia Assi (born 1955), Syrian politician
- Lamia Bahnasawy (born 1984), Egyptian archer
- Lamia Joreige, Lebanese visual artist and filmmaker
- Lamia Makaddam (born 1971), Tunisian poet, journalist, translator
- Lamia Moubayed Bissat (born 1967), Lebanese public servant and advocate
- Lamia Ziade (born 1968), Lebanese illustrator and visual artist
- Lamia Al-Gailani Werr (1938–2019), Iraqi archeologist

=== Lamiya ===
- Lamiya Haji Bashar, Yezidi human rights activist
- Lamiya Abed Khadawi (?–2005), Iraqi politician and Member of Parliament
