= Laimonis =

Latvian male given name

- Gender: Male
- Name day: 29 October

Origin
- Meaning: happy, blessed
- Region of origin: Latvia

Other names
- Related names: Laima

Laimonis is a Latvian masculine given name, borne by more than 1,800 men in Latvia.

The name means "lucky", "happy" or "blessed" and is related to the ancient Latvian word laime ("happiness", "joy" or "luck"), or the goddess Laima. Its nameday is celebrated on 29 October.

Laimonis is one of the relatively few names still in modern use from among the many names of Latvian origin revived or invented during the Latvian National Awakening of the late 19th century. (Note: A number of other names derived from the same root are mostly now rare or obsolete, apart from Laima itself, which is still well-established as a modern Latvian woman's name. Laimīgais (which occurs in 1761 as an equivalent of Felix, "happy" in Latin, in the Jaunā un vecā laika grāmata uz to 1761. gadu, the first Latvian calendar) and Laimīgs - alternative forms of the common modern Latvian word for "happy" - both occur in the 18th century, along with Laimīts. The men's names Laimdonis, Laimdots, Laimgaids, Laimiņš, Laimis, Laimnesis and Laimstars, and the women's names Laimgaita, Laimīte and Laimonda, were all either revived from medieval sources or invented in the late 19th or early 20th century.)

Notable people with the name include:

- Laimonis Laimins, American microbiologist at Northwestern University
- Laimonis Laizāns (1945–2020), Soviet Latvian football goalkeeper who played for FK Daugava Rīga and Torpedo Moscow
