= Bouzaiene =

Bouzaiene is a Tunisian surname. It may refer to:

- Raouf Bouzaiene (born 1970), Tunisian footballer
- Elyas Bouzaiene (born 1997), Swedish footballer of Tunisian origin

== See also ==
- Menzel Bouzaiane (town in Tunis)
