= Yoshitomo Yonetani =

Japanese anime director

Yoshitomo Yonetani (米たに ヨシトモ, Yonetani Yoshitomo; born May 13, 1963 in Tokyo) is a Japanese animator, storyboard artist, and director. Some of his major works directed include The King of Braves GaoGaiGar, Betterman, and Brigadoon: Marin & Melan. He also directed the anime adaptation of Food Wars!: Shokugeki no Soma.

== Works (as director) ==
- The Laughing Salesman (1989-1992)
- 2112: The Birth of Doraemon
- Dorami & Doraemons: Robot School's Seven Mysteries
- The King of Braves GaoGaiGar
- Betterman
- The King of Braves GaoGaiGar Final
- Brigadoon: Marin & Melan
- Nurse Witch Komugi
- Amuri in Star Ocean
- Urusei Yatsura: The Obstacle Course Swim Meet
- Dororon Enma-kun Meeramera
- Food Wars!: Shokugeki no Soma (2015-2020)
- Vatican Miracle Examiner

== See also ==
- Gamera - The franchise's first anime entry was the Netflix series Gamera Rebirth (2023), while several anime projects, such as the one by Yonetani and another by Cartoon Network, were cancelled following the box-office disappointment of Gamera the Brave (2006).
