= The King of Braves GaoGaiGar Final =

Japanese original video animation (OVA) anime series

- Cover art of the visual book

勇者王ガオガイガー FINAL (Yūshaō Gaogaigā Final)
- Created by: Hajime Yatate
- Original video animation
- Directed by: Yoshitomo Yonetani
- Produced by: Hiroyuki Orukawa; Shinichiro Kobayashi
- Written by: Fuyunori Gobu; Yuichiro Takeda
- Music by: Kohei Tanaka
- Studio: Sunrise (Studio 7)
- Licensed by: NA: Discotek Media; SEA: Muse Communication
- Released: January 21, 2000 – March 21, 2003
- Runtime: 30 minutes (ep. 1–7); 50 minutes (ep. 8)
- Episodes: 8
- Anime television series

Grand Glorious Gathering
- Directed by: Yoshitomo Yonetani
- Produced by: Hiroyuki Orukawa; Shinichiro Kobayashi
- Written by: Fuyunori Gobu; Yuichiro Takeda
- Music by: Kohei Tanaka
- Studio: Sunrise
- Original network: TV Tokyo
- Original run: April 11, 2005 – June 27, 2005
- Episodes: 12
- Light novel

King of Kings: GaoGaiGar VS Betterman
- Written by: Yuichiro Takeda
- Published by: Sunrise (Online); Shinkigensha (Print)
- Imprint: Yatate Bunko
- Original run: September 30, 2016 – March 17, 2021
- Volumes: 10
- Manga

King of Kings: GaoGaiGar VS Betterman
- Written by: Yuichiro Takeda
- Illustrated by: Naoyuki Fujisawa
- Published by: Hobby Japan
- Imprint: Hobby Japan
- Original run: September 25, 2018 – present
- Volumes: 7

The King of Braves GaoGaiGar Final (勇者王ガオガイガー FINAL, Yūshaō Gaogaigā Final) is a Japanese OVA anime series produced by Sunrise. It is the direct sequel to the 1997 anime television series The King of Braves GaoGaiGar and the first Brave metaseries officially funded by Bandai following the acquisition of Sunrise. The anime is directed by Yoshitomo Yonetani and written by Fuyunori Gobu and Yuichiro Takeda. It aired in Japan from January 21, 2000, to March 21, 2003, with a total of eight episodes. A 12-episode TV re-imagining, with the subtitle Grand Glorious Gathering was broadcast on TV Tokyo from April 11 to June 27, 2005. A crossover sequel light novel, which focuses on the unused concept of the series, was released on Sunrise' Yatate Bunko imprint on September 30, 2016.

== Plot ==
GaoGaiGar Final is set after the events of the original one, featuring new and returning characters and those from other GaoGaiGar media, including Mamoru and Galeon and the first anime appearance of Renais Kerdif-Shishioh, Gai's cousin from the GGG's sister organization Chasseur, as depicted in the novel Queen of Leo (Leon Reine): The King of Braves Gaogaigar 2005. The series also introduces GaoGaiGar's successor mechanoids GaoFighGar and Genesic GaoGaiGar.

The anime is set in 2007, two years after the Gutsy Galaxy Guard thwarted the invasion of the Zonders, and Mamoru and Galeon departed for the Tri-Solar System. The organization is now tracking down machines called Q-Parts that have regenerative properties, with the criminal group BioNet having stolen one of the machines that was being researched at CERN. Gai is now working with Renais-Kardif Shishioh and biologist Papillon Noir to reclaim one of the Q-Parts from BioNet using the GaoFighGar, GGG's newest trump card. However, he and others become involved in a new conflict when a familiar figure reappears, along with an upcoming calamity that could destroy the universe.

=== Themes ===
Final has different themes than the original series, focusing mainly on two central themes. The first is "together with the oath sworn through courage", a phrase which Gai and others reference throughout the series. The oath is not literal, but rather an embodiment of the heroes' determination to fight to the end. As Papillon Noir states in the finale, they will overcome the difficulties that lie ahead as long as they have courage.

The second theme is God versus Devil, a theme that also appeared in the final battle of the original series. It forms the core philosophy of Planetary Master Palpalapa, who believes that when two great powers clash, the victor becomes God and the vanquished becomes the Devil. He sees himself as God, and at two points he mentally sees Gai as the Devil who brings ruin. The theme is also evident in Palpalapa's ultimate attack, "God and Devil", which mirrors Gai's "Hell and Heaven" attack. Later in Final, Gai is revealed to be the God of Destruction, who brings the hope of starting over from zero and the challenge of infinite possibility. The dualist nature of GaoGaiGar suggests there is a god or goddess of protection, who is implied to be Mikoto Utsugi, an invincible life-form formed from the remnants of Zonder Metal's power.

=== Grand Glorious Gathering ===
Starting in April 2005, a twelve-episode "re-imagining" of the anime, GaoGaiGar Final: Grand Glorious Gathering, aired on TV Tokyo. Due to the different running lengths of the OVA versus the space allowed on TV, they were re-edited and spread across those episodes. A footage from the original anime and new voice recordings were used to fill in the allotted time, as well as a new one which almost exclusively serves to further establish a connection between GaoGaiGar and Betterman, which takes place in the same world and setting. Several incidents of nudity found in the OVA were also censored or omitted.

== Media ==
=== Anime ===
The original OVA series ran from January 21, 2000, to March 21, 2003. The opening song from Episodes 1-6 is "Yūshaō Tanjō! Mythology Version" (勇者王誕生!-神話(マイソロジー)バージョン-, Yūshaō Tanjō! Maisorojī Bājon) by Masaaki Endoh while Episode 7 is titled "Yūshaō Tanjō! Ultimate Mythology Version" (勇者王誕生!-究極神話(マイソロジー)バージョン-, Yūshaō Tanjō! Kyūkyoku Maisorojī Vājon) by Endoh with the GGG Sound Choir. The first ending song is titled "Leon Reine" (獅子の女王(リオン・レーヌ), Rion Rēnu), performed by Saeko Suzuki for Episodes 1-6 and MIQ in Episode 7, while the second ending song is "Itsuka Hoshi no Umi de -Character Version-" (いつか星の海で -Character Version-; "Someday, in the Sea of Stars (Character Version)") by the anime's official cast. Discotek Media announced the OVAs were released on Blu-ray in 2023.

A remastered version of the anime was broadcast in TV Tokyo from April 11 to June 27, 2005, before being replaced by Gun Sword on its timeslot. The opening theme is "Yūshaō Tanjō! Gathering Mythology Version" (勇者王誕生!-集大成神話(ギャザリング・マイソロジー)バージョン-, Yūshaō Tanjō! Gyazaringu Maisorojī Bājon) by Masaaki Endoh, while the ending songs reuse ones from the OVA except certain episodes.

No.	Title	Original release date	Prod. code
1	"The King of Braves is Reborn!" "Yūsha'ō Shinsei!" (勇者王新生!)	January 21, 2000	
The criminal organization BioNet stole one of the Q-Parts being researched at CERN, which has high regenerative properties. The Gusty Galaxy Guard appointed Gai Shishioh to work with his half cousin Renais-Kardif Shishioh and biologist Papillon Noir in Paris, France. Debuting with the new Super Mechanoid, GaoFighGar, Gai alongside GGG managed to defeat one of BioNet's agents and retrieve the Q-Parts. However amidst of their victory, a pale colored Mamoru Amami appeared after a year of his departure.
2	"Gods of Destruction! Decisive Battle in the Storm!" "Hakaishin! Arashi no Kessen!" (破壊神!嵐の決戦!)	March 23, 2000	
Upon the appearance of Mamoru, he then stole one of the Q-Parts as he collects the rest of them, either by guile or by force, and assembles them into their full form, a matter replication device known as the Pas-Q Machine. In the process, Papillon is killed, and Gai takes off after Mamoru. The encounter ends in a battle between GaoFighGar and a copy of GaoGaiGar using Mamoru and a copy of Galeon as the core component. The battle ends in Gai's victory, and both Mamoru and Galeon are revealed to be replicants that dissolve into sand. The machine is promptly taken by a mysterious man with butterfly wings, and GGG prepares to take after him into space.
3	"GGG Exile Order" "GGG Tsuihō Mērē" (GGG追放命令)	July 26, 2000	
Due to the unfortunate events regarding the Q-Parts, GGG attempts to get around the UN's refusal to allow them to leave Earth. The group staged an elaborate ploy together with their related organizations and the Secretary General of the UN, Rose Approval. The result is that three of GGG's Division ships and their crew (that is, the entirety of the main cast) are exiled from Earth, and are free to follow Ikumi Kaidou's directions to the Tri-Solar System. Their enemy is revealed to be the 11 Sol Masters, sentient programs designed to regenerate the Tri-Solar System after the Z-Master was eradicated.
4	"The King of Braves' Last Stand" "Yūsha-ō! Saigo no Hi" (勇者王!最期の刻(ひ))	December 16, 2000	
GGG finally crossed the Galeoria comet and arrived in an alternate pocket universe controlled by 11 Sol Masters. GGG arrive to find a replica of Earth - like all the previous replicants, this is an off-color version. Its only inhabitant is a replica of Papillon, who reveals that this replica of Earth was created moments prior to her original's death by a misfire of the Pas-Q Machine, which produces imperfect duplicates. Papillon was the only human duplicate that was stable enough to survive for more than a few seconds. The Galeon and Mamoru previously met were also Pas-Q Machine duplicates. GGG scours the Earth for Mamoru and the Sol Masters, but fails to find so much as a hint of them. Over time, the majority of GGG becomes lethargic, and most eventually slip into sleep. The Mobile Unit is shut down by them prior to this, leaving only Gai, Papillon and Renais active. Gai hunts for the source of all this, and is accosted by the Sol Masters, who reveal they plan to recreate the Trinary solar system (and subsequently the rest of the universe) by using the Pas-Q machine to convert the existing universe into raw energy and replace it with their duplicate universe. He faces off against Palpalapa, the man who stole the Pas-Q Machine, but falls against Palpalapa's God and Devil attack when he sees that one of the Sol Masters is Cain, leader of the Green Planet.
5	"The White Ark Restored" "Fukkatsu no Shiroki Hakobune" (復活の白き方舟)	October 24, 2001	
GaoFighGar is destroyed by Palpalapa, and Mikoto awakens from her slumber. Papillon reveals that Mikoto is an invincible life-form like the new machine species Zonder, and thus was able to recover from the nerve-relaxing Paras Particles Palparepa had spread across the replicant Earth. Papillon begins work on an antidote, while Mikoto goes to find the imprisoned Soldato J, now mankind's last hope. In the process, she meets the real Mamoru, who had been in the Tri-Solar System for a year and a half. Upon meeting and freeing J (with the help of Renais), Mikoto is attacked by two more Sol Masters - the bee-like Pillnus and the reaper-like Pia Decem, respectively Renais and J's counterparts. The heroes escape on the reborn J-Ark, which is dragged up into the upper atmosphere and forced to do battle with replicants of the entire Mobile Unit and a replica of GaoFighGar piloted by none other than Gai, now under Palparepa's control.
6	"Its Name is G (Genesic)" "Waga Na wa G (Jeneshikku)" (我が名はG(ジェネシック))	April 3, 2002	
The fight between King J-Der and GaoFighGar concludes and results in Gai's purification. J's J-Quath is shattered in the fight after the Repli-Mobile Unit rebel and sacrifice themselves to take some of the blow from the Repli-Goldion Hammer, destroying the Repli-Goldymarg soon afterwards. The Soul Masters attack J-Ark directly, and in the process Gai, Mamoru and Mikoto escape to the G-Crystal located on the replica of the moon, while J finds his J-Jewel shut down. The G-Crystal is the only thing left from the original Tri-Solar System, and it is here that Mamoru has been hiding out all this time, working to restore Galeon to its original form and programming. The Sol Masters attempt to destroy the Crystal, and their duplicate of Cain attempts to conduct Fusion with the new Genesic Galeon. It refuses, and instead reveals that Gai is within, alive and well. Gai conducts Fusion with Galeon, and Mikoto breaks a crystal plate to release the Genesic Machines, the original GaoMachines. Gai performs Final Fusion for the last time to form the God of Destruction, Genesic GaoGaiGar. Mikoto, however, is critically wounded in the aftermath. She is left nearly dead - however, if what Papillon said is true, Mikoto cannot die.
7	"The Super Brave Hero Apocalypse" "Chō Yūsha Mokushiroku" (超勇者黙示録)	September 21, 2002	
Genesic GaoGaiGar demonstrates its sheer destructive power against the Sol Masters until Palus Abel decided to unveil her trump card: fusing Pisa Sol with the Replica Sun and increasing the PasQ Machine's regenerative powers. GGG arrives partway into the battle, now awakened by Papillon's antidote. The members of the Mobile Unit (as well as J-Ark) end up faced off against their counterparts, with J's power being restored and enhanced by proximity to Renais's G-Stone. The battles end up spread across the entire Earth, and Genesic GaoGaiGar's fight with Palpalapa is shown to be very one-sided until Palpalapa powers up by injecting himself with his own Doping Cylinders. Palparepa uses his improved God and Devil as Gai unveils the true form of Hell and Heaven.
8	"Mythology" "Maisorojī" (神話(マイソロジー))	March 21, 2003	
In the final battle against the 11 Sol Masters, GGG fares well initially against each of them. However, the Soul Masters can regenerate forever and eventually destroy the heroes. Each member of the Mobile Unit uses their desperation attack, most of which were formerly only listed in tech specs, and emerges victorious. Gai eventually defeats the powered-up Palpalapa even after he undergoes yet another transformation, and reveals that the G-Stones convert courage into life force. Against this power, the Loud G-Stones that power the Sol Masters lose their strength. Furthermore, the G-Stone's power can grow indefinitely, exceeding the Loud G-Stone's limit. As the Sol Masters fall, their Regeneration Machine – Pisa Sol – proceeds to revive and duplicate them a hundred times over. However, the rapid creation of so many copies strains The Pas-Q machines power, giving GGG the opportunity they need to use their ultimate weapon, the Goldion Crusher, to destroy it and thus end the menace of the Sol Masters. Unfortunately, GGG is faced with the discovery that without the Pas-Q machine to sustain it, this Replicate universe is collapsing, and there is only a one-meter gateway that will be open for two seconds for anyone to escape. At the end, Mamoru and Kaidou are sent in torpedoes out of the universe, bidding tearful farewells to their comrades. Upon their return to earth, Mamoru, Kaidou and Hana create a memorial to honor GGG's sacrifice.

=== King of Kings: GaoGaiGar vs Betterman ===
Cover Art of Volume 1

A sequel web light novel, titled King of Kings: GaoGaiGar vs Betterman (覇界王～ガオガイガー対ベターマン～, Hakaiō ~Gaogaigā tai Betāman ~; "The King of Ruin: GaoGaiGar vs Betterman") was written by Yuichiro Takeda and released by Sunrise under the Yatate Bunko imprint from September 30, 2016, to March 17, 2021. It serves as a crossover to Betterman, using unused concepts from GaoGaiGar Final Project Z.

The light novel takes place eight years after the events of the OVA, focusing on both Mamoru and Kaido alongside the newly-formed Gutsy Global Guard as they fight against the threat of Triple Zero, known also as The Power. While another faction known as Somniums appears, stars to mysteriously support GGG as they prepare for an event referred as the Age of Patria. Shinkigensha compiled the web novels and published it in a physical novel form from June 22, 2017 to September 28, 2021.

Preceded by The King of Braves GaoGaiGar; Betterman	Brave series 2000–2004	Succeeded by King of Kings: Gaogaigar Vs Betterman; Brave Universe Sworgrader
