= List of ambassadors of Yemen to the United Kingdom =

Coordinates: 51.495102°N 0.178684°W

Ambassador of Yemen to the United Kingdom Embassy of Yemen in London
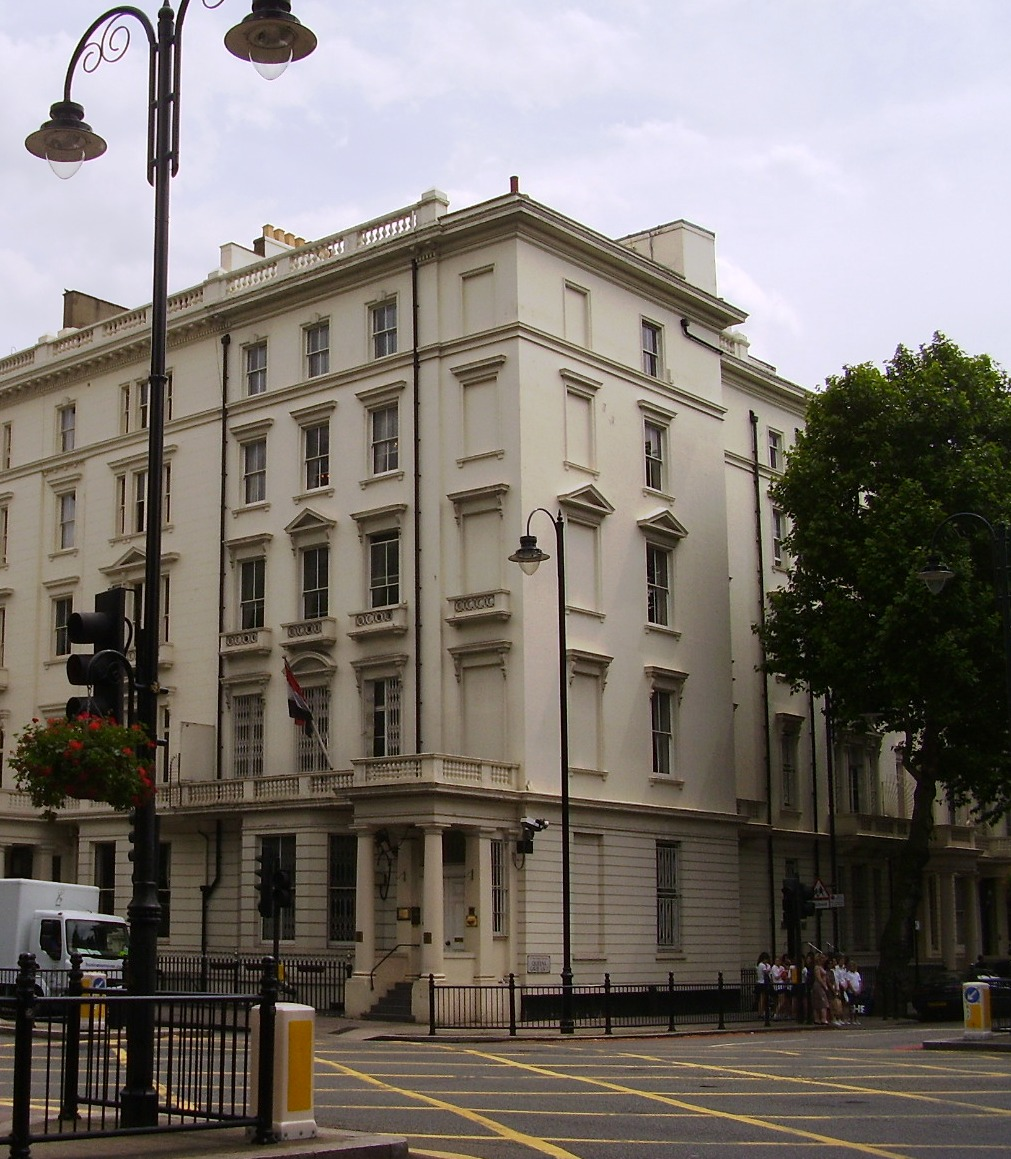
- Incumbent; Yasin Said Numan since October 13, 2015
- Inaugural holder: Assayed Hasan bin Ali Ibrahim
- Formation: October 24, 1951

The Yemenite ambassador to the Court of St James's is the official representative of the Government in Aden to the Government of the United Kingdom in London.

== List of ambassadors ==
Agrément/Diplomatic accreditation	Ambassador	Observations	List of heads of government of Yemen	List of prime ministers of the United Kingdom	Term end
October 24, 1951	Assayed Hasan bin Ali Ibrahim	1967 during the Mutawakkilite Kingdom of Yemen in Exile: List of persons no longer included in the foregoing list but still accepted by Her Majesty's Government as personally possessing Diplomatic Privileges.	Hassan ibn Yahya	Winston Churchill	
January 1, 1955	Assayed Mohamed Ibrahim	Chargé d'affaires	Ahmad bin Yahya	Anthony Eden	
January 1, 1967	Ahmed Mohamed Al-Shamy		Abdullah al-Sallal	Harold Wilson	
May 3, 1973	Mohsin Ahmed Alaini	His Excellency Mr. Mohsin Ahmed Alaini, to present the Letters of Recall of his predecessor Mr. Ahmed Mohamed Al-Shamy, and his own Letters of Credence as Ambassador Extraordinary and Plenipotentiary from the Yemen Arab Republic.	Kadhi Abdullah al-Hagri	Edward Heath	
June 17, 1974	Mohammed Abdullah al-Eryani		Hassan Muhammad Makki	Harold Wilson	January 1, 1977
October 16, 1982	Ahmed Deifellah Al-Azeib		Abd Al-Karim Al-Iryani	Margaret Thatcher	January 1, 1987
May 22, 1990		Yemeni unification, the Yemen Arab Republic was united with South Yemen	Abdul Aziz Abdul Ghani	John Major	
January 1, 1994	Abdullah Mohamed Ali Al-Montser	Chargé d'affaires	Haidar Abu Bakr al-Attas	John Major	
February 28, 1995	Hussein Abdullah al-Amri		Abdul Aziz Abdul Ghani	John Major	January 1, 2000
October 31, 2001	Mutahar Abdullah Al-Saeede	Mutahar Abdullah Alsaeedi	Abdul Qadir Bajamal	Tony Blair	January 1, 2003
September 30, 2005	Mohamed Taha Mustafa		Abdul Qadir Bajamal	Tony Blair	
October 13, 2015	Yassin Saaed Noman Ahmed		Khaled Bahah	David Cameron	

== List of South Yemen ambassadors ==
Agrément/Diplomatic accreditation	ambassador	Observations	List of heads of government of Yemen	List of Prime Ministers of the United Kingdom	Term end
September 9, 1983	Saleh Abdulla Muthana	Saleh Abdulla Muthana	Ali Nasir Muhammad	Margaret Thatcher	
February 18, 1987	Ahmed Abdo Rageh		Yasin Said Numan	Margaret Thatcher	May 22, 1990
May 22, 1990		Yemeni unification with Yemen Arab Republic.	Yasin Said Numan	John Major	
