= Ouled Haffouz =

Coordinates: 35°27′25″N 9°51′08″E

Ouled Haffouz أولاد حفوز
- Commune and town
- Interactive map of Ouled Haffouz
- Country: Tunisia
- Governorate: Sidi Bouzid Governorate

Population (2014)
  - Total: 2,510
- Time zone: UTC+1 (CET)

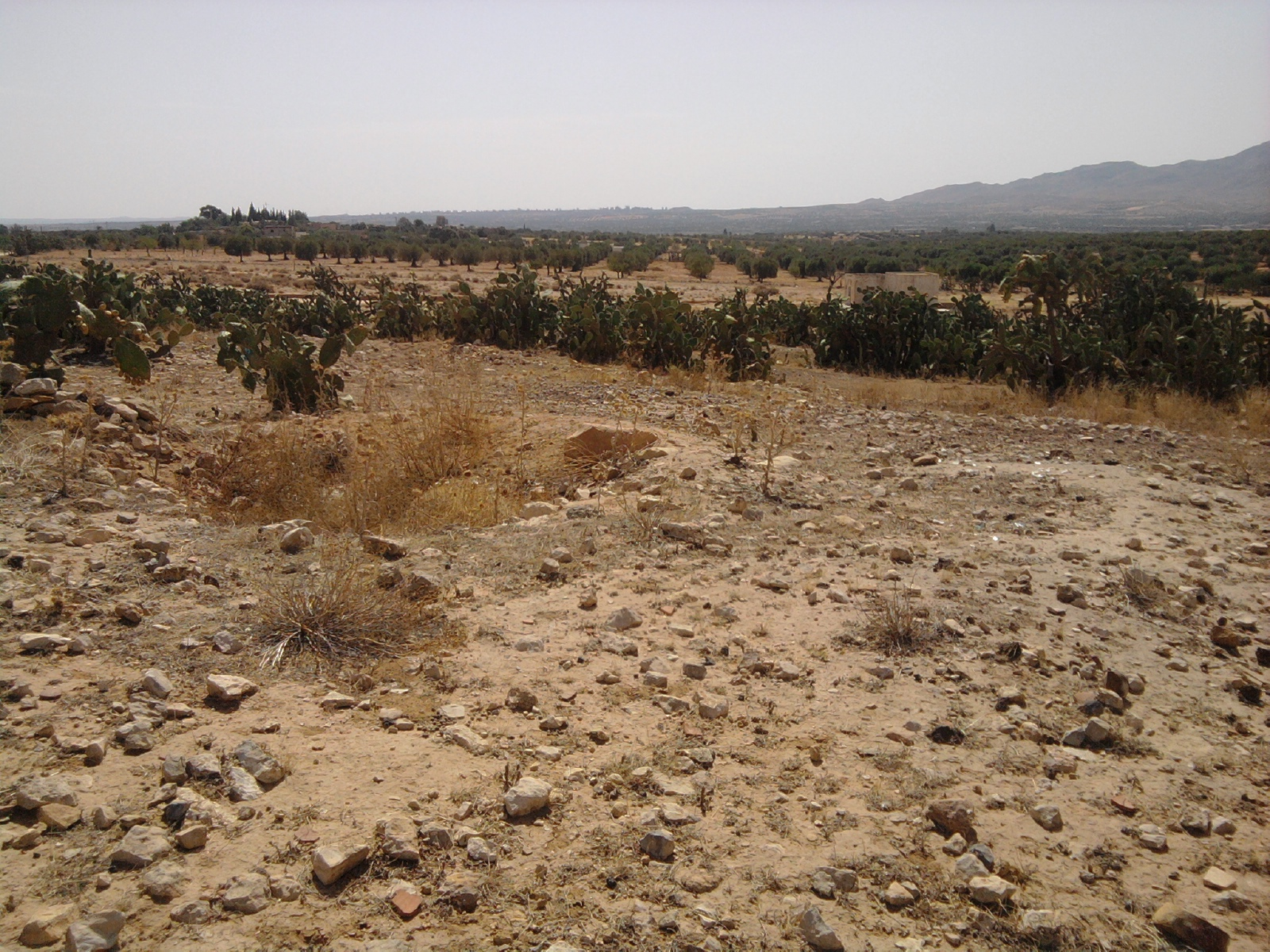
Ouled Haffouz

Ouled Haffouz is a town and commune in the Sidi Bou Zid Governorate, Tunisia. As of 2004 it had a population of 2,145.

== See also ==
- List of cities in Tunisia
