= Kaori (voice actress) =

Japanese voice actress (born 1976)

KAORI.
- Born: February 28, 1976 (age 50); Yokohama, Kanagawa Prefecture, Japan
- Other names: Kawana Akiko (川菜明子) (1994); Kawana Midori (川菜翠) (1995–1999); Ka~na (か〜な); Suzuki Kaori (鈴木カオリ) (2008)
- Occupations: Voice actress; singer
- Years active: 1994–2012
- Notable work: Pocket Monsters: Advanced Generation as Haruka; NANA as Nana Komatsu; Brigadoon: Marin & Melan as Marin Asagi
- Website: spunkystrider.jugem.jp

KAORI. (川奈 翠, Kawana Midori; born February 28, 1976) is a former freelance Japanese voice actress and singer from Yokohama, Kanagawa Prefecture. She was previously employed by Contemporary Music Society and Aksent.

Her most notable voice acting roles are Haruka in Pocket Monsters: Advanced Generation, Nana Komatsu in NANA, and Marin Asagi in Brigadoon: Marin & Melan.

== Career ==
Until around 1999, KAORI. worked under the stage name Kawana Akiko (川菜明子) and then Kawana Midori (川菜翠) at an entertainment agency, but due to a merger with the agency she belonged to, she couldn't use "Kawana Midori" anymore, so she worked under the stage name Ka~na (か〜な) for a brief period. The stage name KAORI., which she used since 2000, is a portmanteau of Kawana Midori. In 2008, when she appeared in Pocket Monsters: Diamond and Pearl, she changed her stage name to Suzuki Kaori (鈴木カオリ), though she continued to use "KAORI." when singing.

She is also a member of the rock band Spunky Strider, in which she was a vocalist.

As of 2012, she has stopped singing, either as a solo artist or with a band, due to vocal cervical dystonia (spasmodic dysphonia). She had signs of vocal problems starting in 2007, prior to her return as Haruka in Pocket Monsters: Diamond and Pearl.

== Filmography ==
=== Television animation ===
- Brigadoon (2000–2001) - Marin Asagi
- The Legend of Condor Hero (2001–2002)
- Getbackers (2002–2003) - Yumiko Imai (Ep. 35)
- Pocket Monsters: Advanced Generation (2002–2006) - Haruka
- Kaleido Star (2003–2004) - Milo
- Paradise Kiss (2005) – Store girl (Ep. 6)
- Black Cat (2005–2006) - Saki (Ep. 17)
- Nana (2006–2007) - Nana Komatsu
- Pocket Monsters: Diamond and Pearl (2006–2010) - Haruka

=== Theatrical animation ===
- Pokémon: Jirachi—Wish Maker (2003) - Haruka
- Pokémon: Destiny Deoxys (2004) - Haruka
- Pokémon: Lucario and the Mystery of Mew (2005) - Haruka
- Pokémon Ranger and the Temple of the Sea (2006) - Haruka

=== Video games ===
- Akiba Girls (2003) - Hatoko Konoha
- Welcome to Pia Carrot - Shiho Kannazuki
- One Piece Grand Warrior - Nefertari Vivi

=== Dubbing ===
- Chaotic (2006–2010) - Sarah (Rebecca Soler)
- H_{2}O: Just Add Water (2006–2010) - Cleo Sertori (Phoebe Tonkin)
