= Cebbala Ouled Asker =

Coordinates: 35°10′43″N 9°16′37″E

Cebbala Ouled Asker السبالة
- Town
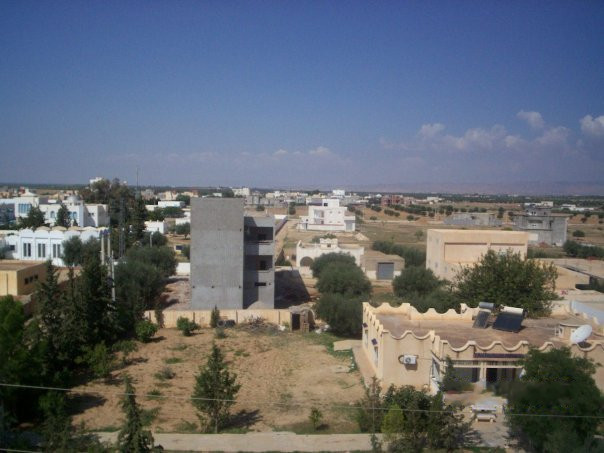
- Interactive map of Cebbala Ouled Asker
- Country: Tunisia
- Governorate: Sidi Bouzid Governorate

Population (2014)
  - Total: 3,361
- Time zone: UTC+1 (CET)

Cebbala Ouled Asker (Arabic: السبالة) is a town and commune in the Sidi Bouzid Governorate, Tunisia. As of 2014, it had a population of 3,361. The town is also the administrative centre of a delegation (district).

Cebbala Ouled Asker is known for its Cebbala Festival, a four-day annual folklore event that celebrates local traditions and culture.

The town's economy is primarily based on agriculture, particularly cattle farming and the cultivation of almond and olive. growing region. Many residents have emigranted to France, and remittances from these emigrants have significantly contributed to the town's economic development.

Cebbala Ouled Asker is also home to several schools, providing education to the local population.

== See also ==
- List of cities in Tunisia
