= Sidi Bouzid Governorate =

Governorate of Tunisia

Sidi Bouzid ولاية سيدي بوزيد
- Governorate
- Map of Tunisia with Sidi Bouzid highlighted

- Subdivisions of Sidi Bouzid Governorate
- Coordinates: 35°02′N 9°30′E
- Country: Tunisia
- Created: 1973
- Capital: Sidi Bouzid

Government
  - Governor: Faycel Bessaoudi (since 2024)

Area
  - Total: 7,405 km^{2} (2,859 sq mi)
  - Rank: Ranked 7th of 24

Population (2014)
  - Total: 429,912
  - Rank: Ranked 13th of 24
  - Density: 58.06/km^{2} (150.4/sq mi)
- Time zone: UTC+01 (CET)
- Postal prefix: 91
- ISO 3166 code: TN-43

Sidi Bouzid Governorate (Tunisian Arabic: ولاية سيدي بوزيد; French: Gouvernorat de Sidi Bouzid), sometimes spelt Sidi Bou Zid, is one of the 24 governorates (provinces) of Tunisia. It is in central Tunisia and landlocked. It covers an area of 7405 km^{2} and has a population of 429,912 (2014 census). The capital is its most populous settlement, Sidi Bouzid. Mainly rural, it is becoming increasingly urbanized (22.2% in 1999 compared to 12.4% in 1984).

== Geography ==
Toward the east and south of the governorate feature narrow escarpments of the dorsal Atlas Mountains and the western border is elevated. The land otherwise slopes generally east throughout. Lakes are scarce relative to other northern and central divisions. A dammed lake, the Barrage Sidi Saad, commences on the northern border with Kairouan Governorate; within the administrative area its principal effect is to widen the main river, the Oued El Hatech which rises close to the Algerian border on the far west side of neighbouring Kasserine Governorate. The river adjoins fields on the northern edge of the town of Sidi Bouzid. A larger seasonal salt lake, the Sebkhet en Noual is largely within the area and on the south-east border. It is described on some maps as a salt marsh. The smaller maximum-size Sebkhet Mecheguia forms a short part of the eastern border. The natural landscape is semi-arid with irrigated areas used for cultivation and grazing. The climate is therefore temperate at night, except in unusual overcast conditions and precipitation is confined largely to winter months/early spring, its levels are variable, see Climate.

== Administrative divisions ==
The following cities and towns are located in the governorate:

- Bir El Hafey
- Cebbala Ouled Asker
- Jilma
- Menzel Bouzaiane
- Meknassy
- Mezzouna
- Ouled Haffouz
- Regueb
- Sidi Ali Ben Aoun
- Sidi Bouzid (capital)
