= Haerul Amri =

Indonesian politician (1972–2024)

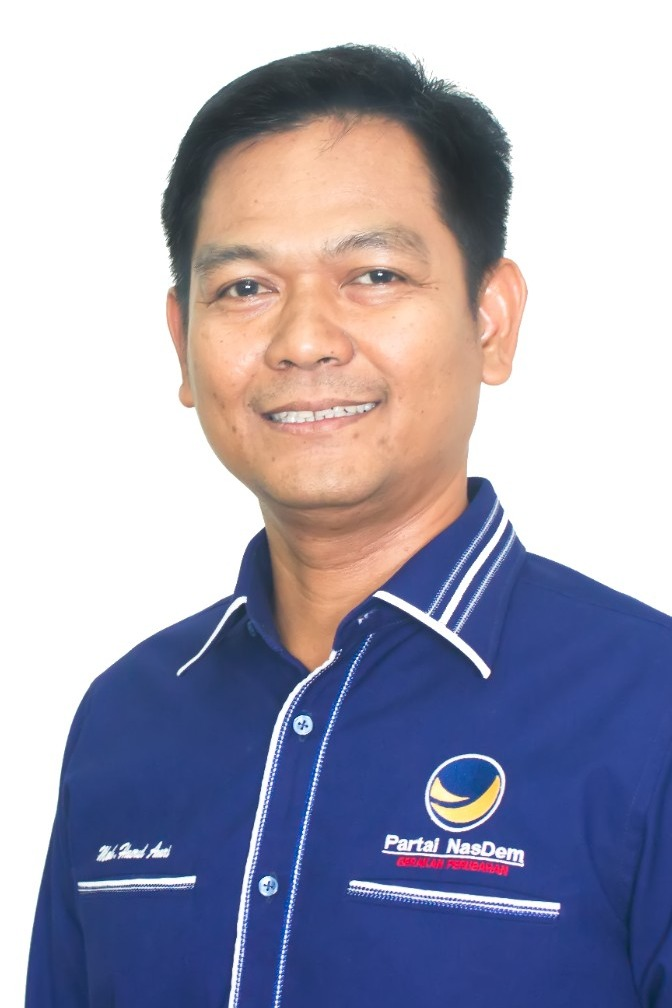
- Amri in 2023

Member of the House of Representatives of Indonesia for East Java II
- In office 18 February 2022 – 6 May 2024
- Preceded by: Hasan Aminuddin
- Succeeded by: TBD

Personal details
- Born: Mohammad Haerul Amri; 13 October 1972 Karawang Regency, Indonesia
- Died: 6 May 2024 (aged 51) Palembang, Indonesia
- Party: NasDem
- Education: Universitas Darul Ulum Jombang

Mohammad Haerul Amri (13 October 1972 – 6 May 2024) was an Indonesian politician. A member of the NasDem Party, he served in the House of Representatives from 2022 to 2024.

Amri died of a heart attack in Palembang on 6 May 2024, at the age of 51.
