= Laima (given name) =

- Gender: Female
- Name day: February 11

Origin
- Meaning: luck, birth
- Region of origin: Latvia, Lithuania

Other names
- Related names: Laimonis

Laima is a Latvian and Lithuanian female given name, which means "luck" or "beginning". Laima is the goddess of fate and birth in Baltic mythologies. The name may refer to:

- Laima Adlytė (born 1971), Lithuanian draughts player
- Laima Andersone-Silāre (1929–2026), Latvian opera singer
- Laima Andrikienė (born 1958), Lithuanian politician
- Laima Bernatavičiūtė (born 1985), Lithuanian handballer
- Laima Muktupāvela (born 1962), Latvian author
- Laima Vaikule (born 1954), Latvian actress
- Laima Zilporytė (born 1967), Lithuanian cyclist
