= Regueb =

Coordinates: 34°52′N 9°47′E

Regueb الرقاب
- Commune and town
- Interactive map of Regueb
- Country: Tunisia
- Governorate: Sidi Bouzid Governorate

Population (2014)
  - Total: 11,430
- Time zone: UTC+1 (CET)
- Postal Code of Regueb: 9170
- Website: https://www.regueb.city

Regueb is a town and commune in the Sidi Bou Zid Governorate, central Tunisia. As of 2004 it had a population of 7,892.

Regueb is located 90 kilometers from Sfax, 110 kilometers from Kairouan, and 90 kilometers from the city of Gafsa.

== Population ==
2014 Census (Municipal)
Homes	Families	Males	Females	Total
3153	2747	5686	5734	11420

== See also ==
- List of cities in Tunisia
