= Laimonis Laimins =

Laimonis A. Laimins is an American microbiologist currently the Guy and Anne Youmans Professor at Northwestern University and an Elected Fellow of the American Association for the Advancement of Science.

== Education ==
He earned his B.S. in physics at Case Western Reserve University followed by his Ph.D. at University of Chicago in 1981.

== Research ==
His interests are cervical cancer, papillomaviruses and epithelia cells. His highest cited paper is Human papillomavirus oncoproteins: pathways to transformation at 947 times, according to Google Scholar.

== Publications ==
- Michelle S. Longworth and Laimonis A. Laimins. Pathogenesis of Human Papillomaviruses in Differentiating Epithelia. Microbiol. Mol. Biol. Rev. June 2004 vol. 68 no. 2 362-372
- L A Laimins, G Khoury, C Gorman, B Howard, and P Gruss .Host-specific activation of transcription by tandem repeats from simian virus 40 and Moloney murine sarcoma virus. PNAS. 1982. Vol. 79 no. 21
- C Meyers, MG Frattini, JB Hudson, LA Laimins. Biosynthesis of human papillomavirus from a continuous cell line upon epithelial differentiation. Science Vol. 257, Iss. 5072, (Aug 14, 1992): 971.
- RS Hegde, SR Grossman, LA Laimins, PB Sigler. Crystal structure at 1.7 Å of the bovine papillomavirus-1 E2 DMA-binding domain bound to its DNA target. Nature 359, 505–512 (8 October 1992)

Patron of the University of Latvia. Since 2014, Latvian origin patrons Laimonis and Kristīna (née Sīmanis) Laimiņš had established the Laimiņš Family Scholarship dedicated for the University of Latvia Biology Faculty students. All the donations are administered by the University of Latvia Foundation.
