= Hussein Bin Abdallah Al Amri =

Yemeni diplomat and writer (born 1944)

- Born: Sanaa, Yemen
- Citizenship: Yemeni
- Occupations: Writer and Diplomat
- Notable work: Tarikh alyaman alhadith walmueasir Miat eam min tarikh alyaman alhadith Yamaniaat fi altaarikh walsiyasa Hawliaat alealamat aljirafiu

Hussein Abdullah Al-Amri (Arabic: حسين بن عبد الله العمري; born 1944) is a Yemeni diplomat and writer. He served as ambassador of Yemen to the United Kingdom from 1995 to 2001.

== Early life and education ==
Hussain was born and raised in the Yemeni capital Sana’a. He graduated from Damascus University with a BA in history from the Faculty of Arts, a master's degree from Cambridge University, and a doctorate from the University of Durham.

== Career ==
Hussein began his career when he held a number of administrative positions in Yemen, becoming an ambassador and then a deputy minister. Hussein is a scholar, political historian, and a professor of modern and contemporary history at Sana’a university. He has participated in many academic and scientific seminars and conferences, and has many books, research, studies and investigations.

Hussein has authored a book entitled The Modern and Contemporary History of Yemen: From Al-Mutawakil Ismail to Al-Mutawakil Yahya Hamid Al-Din, a book that includes various articles, lectures and theses - compiled as the author says for the sake of researchers and foreign readers interested in the political and cultural history of Yemen and dealing with the modern and contemporary history of Yemen. Extending between the eighteenth and twentieth centuries, the text of a fatwa by the future scholar on the legal status of the Batiniyya and Ismailis among the residents of Hamdan, which had never been published, and a document containing the correspondences of Imam Yahya Hamid al-Din with the tribes of eastern and southern Yemen for the liberation of Aden from British forces, reveals. It shows what was stated, first, in the sacred national document, which represents the theoretical orientation and the temporary constitution of the national movement and the forces opposing Imam Yahya, and secondly, the national document of 1982, whose beginning and conditions were represented by the 1962 revolution in the north and independence in the south in 1967, while he was passing through Yemen has experienced severe periods of struggle, instability, the emergence of extremism, and the different opinions of the Islamic right and the Marxist–Leninist left. Then he gives a brief history; He recalls Yemen's relations with Europe and the Kingdom of Holland, and talks briefly about the life of the last imam, Muhammad al-Badr, who ruled Yemen after the withdrawal of the Turks in 1636. Finally, the book discusses in detail the role of the Yemeni/Arab media in Asia during the twentieth century, and the Yemeni (Hadrami) role. In East Asia, Indonesia, Malaysia and Singapore, then he talks about Yemen's similarity with Vienna in terms of beauty and the Ottoman siege of both.

The Yemeni author published another book entitled From the Modern and Contemporary History of Yemen: Annals of the Historian Jahaf… The Early Years of the Biography of Al-Mahdi Abdullah from the House of Contemporary Thought. Month after month over a period of nearly two years, this biography was replete with information and historical, economic and social news, and the author gave it documented, honest life in Yemen during the years 1231-1233 AH, and it is a building block in the edifice of the history of Yemen.

The title of his third book was One Hundred Years of Modern Yemen’s History by Dar Al Fikr Al Contemporary also. In it, the book deals with a hundred years of modern Yemen's history (1748–1848), where it begins with the appointment of Al-Mahdi Abbas assuming power and his history and for Yemen in his time, and for Yemen and the Arab world, and how he rid himself of competing with aspiring politicians in the Imamate, and of the raids of fanatical tribes, describing his court, his entourage, his ministers, and his involvement in the endowment funds and public ghouls. He talks about the house of Imam al-Mahdi and his son al-Mansur's assumption of power, his appointment of judges, leaders, princes, and ministers, and his punishment of Prince Amber, and describes palaces and weddings, the system of justice, administration and money. It discusses internal disturbances and external events, tribal wars with the imams of Sana'a, the beginning of troubles, the battle of Umm Sargin, preparing an army to eliminate the greedy, confronting Sharif Hammoud and the Wahhabi threat. He talks about Al-Mutawakkil Ahmed bin Al-Mansour Ali's wresting of power from his father, his control over the crisis of affairs, his campaign on Kawkaban, the families of Sharaf Al-Din, the demolition of graves and the campaign against Tihama, and the acceleration of events after his death. It discusses the rule of Al-Mahdi Abdullah, the restoration of Sanaa's control of Tihama, the successive events until the death of Al-Mahdi, the struggle of the imams, the advent of the Ottoman Turks to Yemen, tribal unrest, the Egyptian-British rivalry over Yemen, and the conquest of Aden. The book is appended with important documents and useful indexes according to it.

In 2009, the Yemeni writer published a new book entitled Yemen and the West 1571-1962, in which he dealt with Yemen's relations with the West from the 16th century until the September 1962 revolution, with a European vision and objectively, to provide those interested in the affairs of the Arabian Peninsula with a historical background to the contemporary political situation in Yemen, with information that analyzes the relations of Yemen in the West. The book begins with a historical introduction dating back to pre-Islamic times until the beginning of the 16th century, then presents the early interests of the Europeans in Yemen, the European shift from trade to politics, and their sea voyages to Yemen in which the conflict between East and West, and the colonial competition between America, Britain and France, over Yemen, and the emergence of the Wahhabi threat. The book talks about the Turkish forces in Yemen and the problem of the borders, the Anglo-Turkish border committee, the outbreak of the First World War, the British relations with Imam Yahya and Yemen, between the two world wars, and their improvement, the Jacob and Clinton expeditions, the border incidents, the contemporary of Sana’a, the emergence of the Italian danger, the railway project and France The Americas, the Germans, the Dutch, and the Japanese in Yemen, and the outbreak of World War II. The book discusses the killing of Imam Yahya, the deportation of the Jews of Yemen to Palestine, the 1950 London talks, the beginning of the end, the diplomatic representation 1951, the first plans for the Federation of Aden, the basis of the border problem, Hikputam's federal plans 1955–1997, the Russians in Yemen 923–1957, and the armed forces Yemen, and supplied it with Russian weapons in 1956.

Hussein Abdullah Al-Omari also published the book The Mark and the Mujtahid Al-Talaq Al-Hassan Bin Ahmad Al-Jalal, in which he talked about the life of the scholar, Al-Hassan Bin Ahmed Al-Jalal, and his effects, and in a study and verified texts, and in which there is a translation by his contemporary, the great Yemeni historian Yahya Bin Al-Hussein Bin Al-Qasim from his book The Joy of Time in the History of Accidents and followed it up with the book Princes of Slaves and Mamluks in Yemen, in which he explained the history of the slave princes and Mamluks in Yemen through the centuries, and shows their condition before and after Islam, including the slave trade and slavery centers, with an important historical document which is the Declaration of Yemen in 1943 AD, which prohibited slavery and the slave trade.

== List of his works ==
Notable publications:

1.The Modern and Contemporary History of Yemen (Original title: Tarikh Alyaman Alhadith Walmueasir)

2. One Hundred Years of Yemen's Modern History (Original title: Miat Aam Min Tarikh Alyaman Alhadith)

3. Allama and Mujtahid al-Mutlaq al-Hasan bin Ahmad al-Jalal his Life and Implications (Original title: Alealaamat Waltajtahid Almutlaq Alhasan Bin 'Ahmad Aljalal; Hayatuh Watharuh).

4. Yemeni Women in History, Culture and Politics (Original title: almar'at alyamaniat fi altaarikh walthaqafat walsiyasa).

5. Annals of the Graphic Mark (Original title: Hawliaat Alealamat Aljirafiu).
