= Abdullah Alamri =

Saudi Arabian professor of geophysics

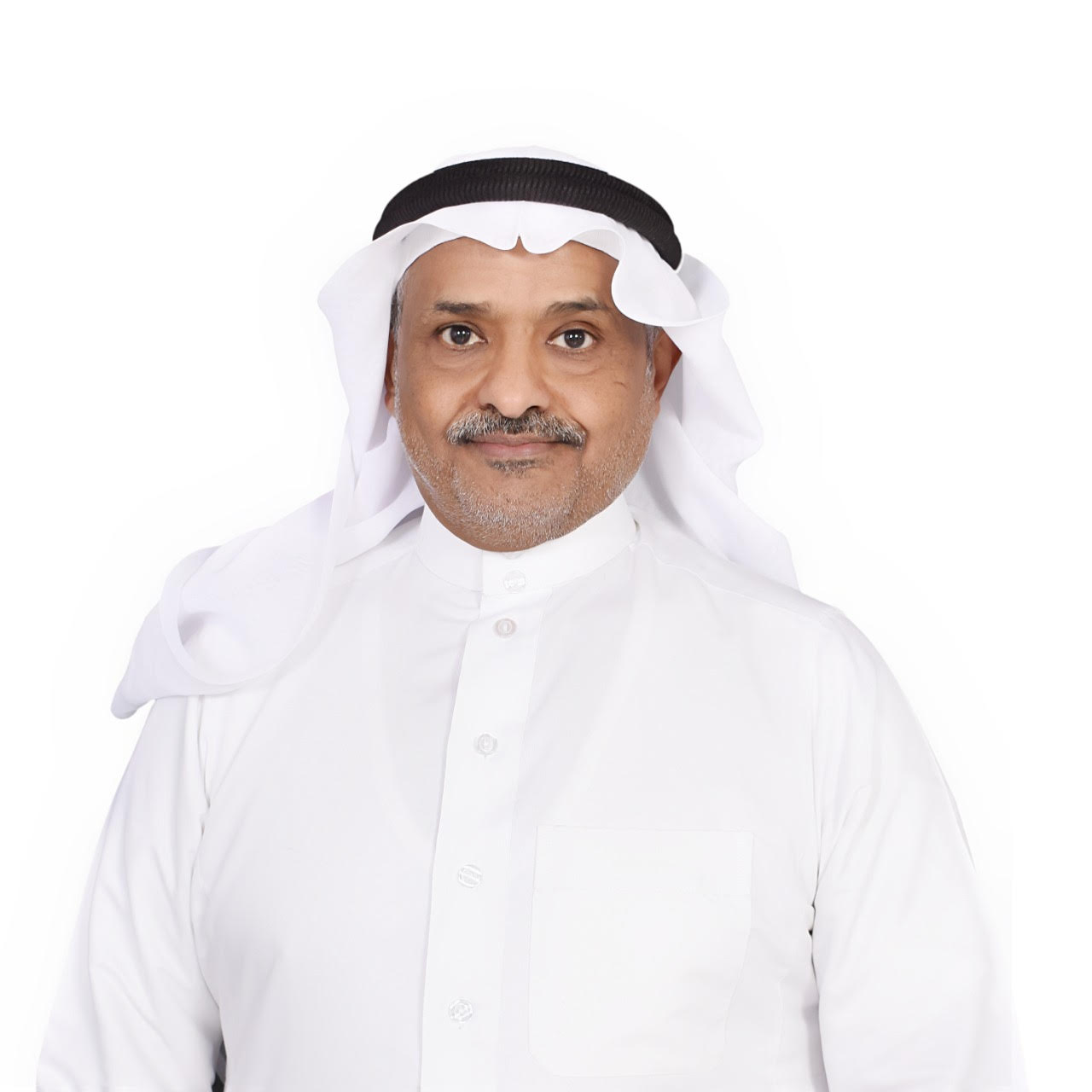
- Born: Saudi Arabia

Academic work
- Discipline: Geophysics
- Institutions: King Saud University

Abdullah M. Alamri (Arabic: عبدالله العُمري) is a Saudi Arabian professor of geophysics, at the King Saud University since 1990. He is the Founder and Editor in Chief of the Arabian Journal of Geosciences. He also serves as the Director of the Seismic Studies Center, and is currently serving as the President of Saudi Society of Geosciences.

== Career ==
Abdullah obtained his B.Sc. in geology (1981) from King Saud University, and M. Sc.in Applied Geophysics from University of South Florida, Tampa and has also taken Ph.D. (1990) in earthquake seismology from University of Minnesota, United States. His interest in crustal structures, seismic micro zoning and applications of EM and MT in deep groundwater exploration and geothermal prospecting has paved way for the establishment of the Arabian Journal of Geosciences (AJGS). AJGS publishes one issue of 30–35 articles every two weeks (24 issues a year in total) and covers the entire range of topics in Earth Sciences.

He is a principal and co-investigator of several national and international projects: KSU, KACST, SGS, ARAMCO, DSFP, NPST, IRIS, CTBTO, US Air force, NSF, UCSD, LLNL, OSU, PSU and Max Planck. He has also chaired and co-chaired several SSG, GSF, RELEMR workshops and forums in the Middle East.
