= Menzel Bouzaiane =

Menzel Bouzaiane منزل بوزيان Manzel Bouzayen
- Commune and town
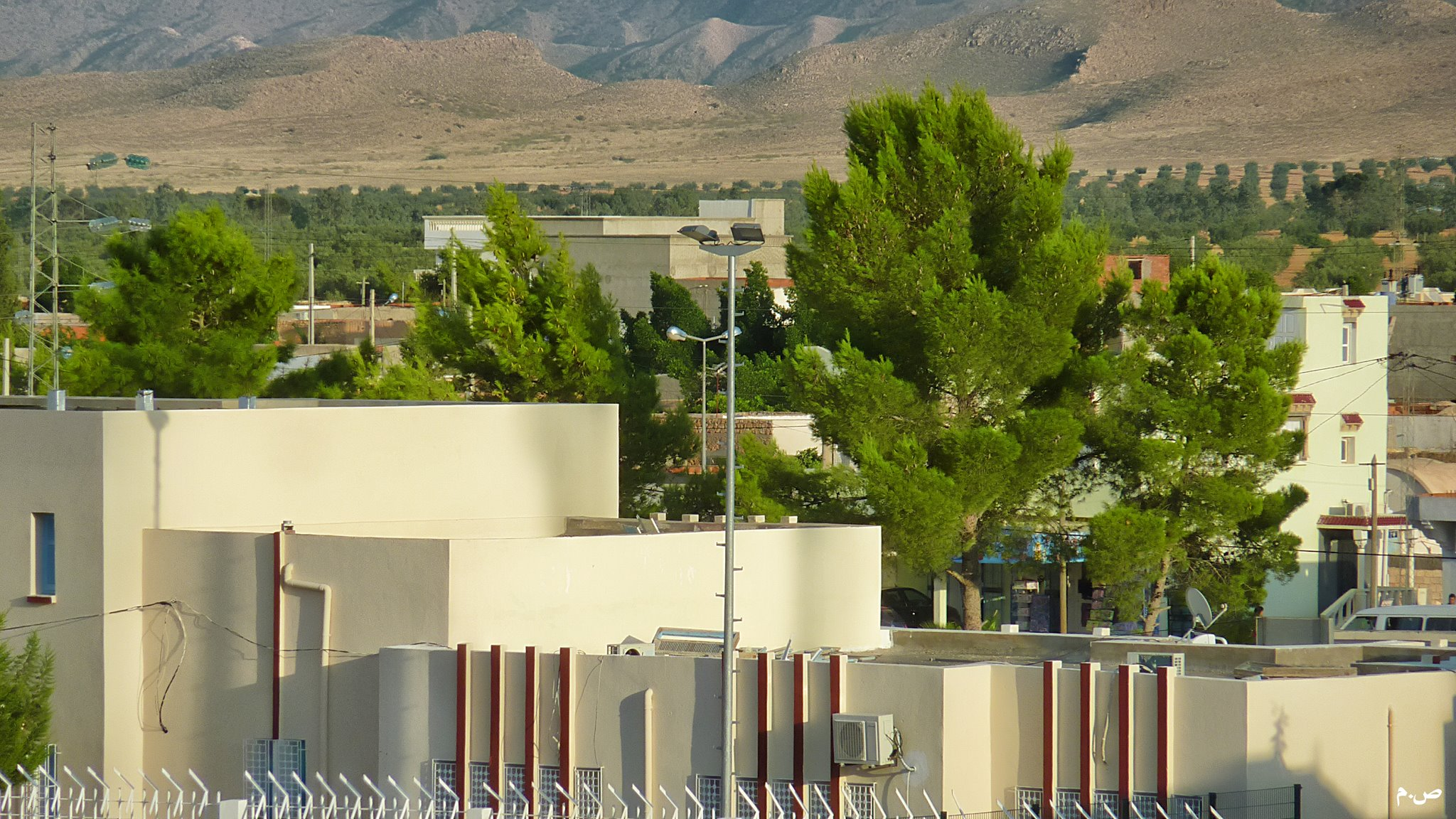

- Location in Tunisia
- Coordinates: 34.574°N 9.429°E
- Country: Tunisia
- Governorate: Sidi Bouzid Governorate

Population (2014)
  - Total: 7,119
- Time zone: UTC+1 (CET)
- Postal code: 9114
- Area code: 216

Menzel Bouzaiane is a town and commune in the Sidi Bou Zid Governorate, Tunisia. As of 2004 it had a population of 5,595.

== Population ==
2014 Census (Municipal)
Homes	Families	Males	Females	Total
1784	1565	3527	3586	7113

== See also ==
- List of cities in Tunisia
