= The King of Braves GaoGaiGar =

Japanese anime television series

- 勇者王ガオガイガー
- Genre: Action; Mecha; Science fiction
- Created by: Hajime Yatate
- Developed by: Yoshitake Suzuki
- Directed by: Yoshitomo Yonetani
- Music by: Kohei Tanaka
- Country of origin: Japan
- Original language: Japanese
- No. of episodes: 49

Production
- Producers: Hitoshi Kako (Nagoya TV); Toshinori Yokoyama (Nagoya TV); Mami Kohara (Tokyu Agency); Ryōsuke Takahashi (Sunrise)
- Production companies: Nagoya TV; Tokyu Agency; Sunrise

Original release
- Network: ANN (Nagoya TV, TV Asahi)
- Release: February 1, 1997 – January 31, 1998

Related
Further information
Video game
Blockaded Numbers
Developer	Takara
Publisher	Takara
Genre	Action, Visual Novel
Platform	PlayStation
Released	JP: April 8, 1999
Novel
Queen of Leo: Leon Reine
Written by	Yuichiro Takeda
Illustrated by	Takahiro Kimura; Seiichi Nakatani
Published by	Media Factory
Imprint	MF Bunko J
Published	December 1, 2003
Related anime
The King of Braves GaoGaiGar Final (2000–2003 OVA); Betterman (1999 TV series)

The King of Braves GaoGaiGar (勇者王ガオガイガー, Yūsha Ō Gaogaigā) is a Japanese anime television series produced by Sunrise. It is the eighth installment in the Brave series franchise. Yoshitomo Yonetani is its director, with Yoshitake Suzuki handling series scripts, Takahiro Kimura as character designer, Kunio Okawara designing mechanical elements, Tomoaki Okada as art director, and Kohei Tanaka as music producer. The series aired on Nagoya TV and TV Asahi affiliate stations from February 1, 1997, to January 31, 1998.

The series follows the exploits of two protagonists: One is a cyborg named Guy Shishioh, who pilots the titular Gaogaigar, and the other is a mysterious boy Mamoru. Together, they must defend the world against the malevolent Zonders all while Mamoru's connection with them begins to unfold.

== Plot ==
On a winter night, a mysterious mechanical lion appeared before a married couple, carrying a mysterious baby with it, and left as they took the baby in. About seven years later, high school astronaut Guy Shishioh is aboard the space shuttle Spirits when it collides with an unknown object bound to Earth. Despite being mortally wounded, the lion rescues him and he returns to Earth, holding a mysterious green jewel that Leo Shishioh uses to revive him as a cyborg.

Two years later, in 2005, the mysterious baby, now under the care of the Amami family and named Mamoru, lives a normal life until a mysterious group called Zonders begins invading Earth. In response, the Earth Defense Brigade Gutsy Geoid Guard, also known as the GGG, organizes to fight against them. During an attack by the Zonders, Mamoru encounters Guy, who is now a member of the GGG. Equipped with the green jewel, which is known as the G-Stone, he becomes the pilot of the lion robot, which is called Galeon, fusing with it alongside three assist vehicles the GGG created to become the giant robot GaoGaiGar. After a battle against one of the Zonders, the GGG discovers that Mamoru can purify people who became Zonders and seeks to uncover his origins and how he is connected to the appearance of the Zonders.

== Development ==
The King of Braves GaoGaiGar was produced by Sunrise, with Takara promoting the toys for the series. Billed as the final installment of the Brave series, director Yoshitomo Yonetani originally named the series as "The King of Braves Gaggatti", with other proposed names including "GargaiGaa" and ""GO Gieger" until the finalized name was accepted. The series' overall theme was based on the folktale The Tale of the Bamboo Cutter, reflecting on the mysterious origins of Mamoru Amami, the series' kid protagonist, with the message of "If you have the courage, you can call in any miracle", woven into the series' narrative.

To differentiate the series from other Brave series, Real Robot terms and concepts alongside Super Robot concepts were woven into the narrative, being more ambitious in execution. The narrative was made similar to a hot-blooded manga, centering on the battle between a powerful extraterrestrial life form and a giant robot that brings together the best of human science, while also incorporating detailed depictions of mechanical elements throughout the series. The creation of such realistically oriented mecha designs also influenced the development of toys, resulting in a gap between how the mechas were depicted in the series and the toys that were commercialized. As a result, elements regarded as "standard" in the Brave series, such as swords and guns as weapons and power-ups in the form of "Super Combinations", were not present in the series. To balance this out, in both the series and the toys, the gimmicks and individuality of each mecha were fleshed out more.

== Media ==
=== Anime ===
The King of Braves GaoGaiGar aired on Nagoya TV from February 1, 1997, to January 31, 1998, consisting of 49 episodes. Masaaki Endoh performed the series' opening theme "Yuusha Oh Tanjou!" (勇者王誕生!, Yūshaō Tanjō!; The King of Braves is Born!) while Satoko Shimonari performed the series' ending theme "Itsuka Hoshi no Umi de" (いつか星の海で; "Someday in the Sea of Stars"). Media Blasters once licensed the series on April 19, 2006, for North American territories in DVD format, with only 25 out of the 49 episodes dubbed in English. However, due to multiple issues followed with poor sales, the series was dropped. It was available as part of a digital subscription package from Daisuki until the service was terminated in 2017. Discotek Media later rescued the license from Media Blasters and announced a release of the series, alongside the OVA sequel, on Blu-ray in Winter 2023.

The show's popularity later resulted in the production of an eight–part sequel OVA,The King of Braves GaoGaiGar Final, which was released from January 21, 2000, to March 21, 2003, and the spinoff TV series Betterman, which aired on TV Tokyo from April 1, 1999, to September 30, 1999.

==== Episodes ====
No.	Title	Directed by	Written by	Storyboarded by	Original release date
1	"The King of Braves is Born!"; Transliteration: "Yūsha-ō tanjō!" (Japanese: 勇者王誕生！)	Gorō Taniguchi	Yoshitake Suzuki	Yoshitomo Yonetani	February 1, 1997
2	"The Boy With Green hair" Transliteration: "Midori no kami no shōnen" (Japanese: 緑の髪の少年)	Kunihisa Sugishima	Yoshitake Suzuki	Kunihisa Sugishima; Yoshitomo Yonetani	February 8, 1997
3	"The Holy Left Arm"; Transliteration: "Seinaru hidariude" (Japanese: 聖なる左腕)	Yūji Yamaguchi	Yoshitake Suzuki	Yūji Yamaguchi	February 15, 1997
4	"Escapee Zondar"; Transliteration: "Tōbōsha Zondā" (Japanese: 逃亡者ゾンダー)	Kazuhito Kikuchi	Yasushi Hirano	Kazuhito Kikuchi	February 22, 1997
5	"Blue and Red"; Transliteration: "Ao to aka" (Japanese: 青と赤)	Mamoru Hamatsu	Hiroshi Yamaguchi	Mamoru Hamatsu	March 1, 1997
6	"Its name is ChoRyuJin"; Transliteration: "Sono na wa ChōRyūJin" (Japanese: その名は超竜神)	Gorō Taniguchi	Yūichirō Takeda	Mamoru Hamatsu	March 8, 1997
7	"Drive Away the Black 300!"; Transliteration: "Kuro no 300 o oe!" (Japanese: 黒の300を追え！)	Kunihisa Sugishima	Yoshitake Suzuki	Kunihisa Sugishima	March 15, 1997
8	"The Day The Sun Disappeared"; Transliteration: "Taiyō ga kieru hi" (Japanese: 太陽が消える日)	Yasuhiro Minami	Yasushi Hirano	Yoshitomo Yonetani	March 22, 1997
9	"Element Z0"; Transliteration: "Soryūshi Z0" (Japanese: 素粒子Z0)	Shinji Takamatsu	Hiroshi Yamaguchi	Shinji Takamatsu	March 29, 1997
10	"The Lightless World"; Transliteration: "Hikari todokanu sekai" (Japanese: 光届かぬ世界)	Eiji Yamanaka	Yoshitake Suzuki	Atsuko Kase	April 5, 1997
11	"Gate of Izolude"; Transliteration: "Izorude no mon" (Japanese: イゾルデの門)	Mamoru Hamatsu	Yūichirō Takeda	Mamoru Hamatsu	April 12, 1997
12	"Tomorrow"; Transliteration: "Ashita" (Japanese: 明日)	Yoshitomo Yonetani	Yoshitomo Yonetani	Yoshitomo Yonetani	April 19, 1997
13	"Legacy of Cain"; Transliteration: "Kain no isan" (Japanese: カインの遺産)	Kunihisa Sugishima	Yūichirō Takeda	Kunihisa Sugishima	April 26, 1997
14	"The Valley That Calls Forth the Mist"; Transliteration: "Kiri ga yobu keikoku" (Japanese: 霧が呼ぶ渓谷)	Yūji Yamaguchi	Hiroshi Yamaguchi	Kazuhito Kikuchi	May 3, 1997
15	"GGG Targeted"; Transliteration: "Nerawareta GGG" (Japanese: 狙われたGGG)	Gorō Taniguchi	Hiroaki Kitajima	Gorō Taniguchi	May 12, 1997
16	"Demon of Midday"; Transliteration: "Shōgo no akuma" (Japanese: 正午の悪魔)	Nana Harada	Hiroshi Yamaguchi	Hiroshi Nishikiori	May 17, 1997
17	"That Which Controls Space"; Transliteration: "Kūkan o seisuru mono" (Japanese: 空間を制する者)	Akihiko Nishiyama	Yoshitake Suzuki	Tetsuya Watanabe; Kunihiro Mori	May 24, 1997
18	"A Promise is the Other's Light"; Transliteration: "Yakusoku wa hikari no kanata" (Japanese: 約束は光の彼方)	Kunihisa Sugishima	Yūichirō Takeda	Akira Nishimori	May 31, 1997
19	"The Destructive Right Arm"; Transliteration: "Horobu beki migiude" (Japanese: 滅ぶべき右腕)	Yasuhiro Minami	Yūichirō Takeda	Kazuhito Kikuchi	June 7, 1997
20	"Teacher Zondar"; Transliteration: "Zondar-sensei" (Japanese: ゾンダー先生)	Gorō Taniguchi	Hiroaki Kitajima	Gorō Taniguchi	June 14, 1997
21	"Gold-Colored God of Destruction"; Transliteration: "Konjiki no hakaishin" (Japanese: 金色の破壊神)	Yūji Yamaguchi	Hiroshi Yamaguchi	Kōjin Ochi	June 21, 1997
22	"Towards the Polluted Sky"; Transliteration: "Kegasareshi sora e" (Japanese: 汚されし空へ)	Mamoru Hamatsu	Yoshitake Suzuki	Mamoru Hamatsu	June 28, 1997
23	"Mike 13"; Transliteration: "Maiku 13" (Japanese: マイク13)	Akihiko Nishiyama	Yūichirō Takeda	Shinichi Watanabe	July 5, 1997
24	"Disconnected "Protect""; Transliteration: "Hazusareta purotekuto" (Japanese: はずされた鍵)	Gorō Taniguchi	Hiroaki Kitajima; Yoshitomo Yonetani	Yoshitomo Yonetani	July 12, 1997
25	"Voice of Ruin"; Transliteration: "Horobi no koe" (Japanese: 滅びの声)	Takeshi Yoshimoto	Hiroaki Kitajima	Akira Nishimori	July 19, 1997
26	"Cross the Dimensions"; Transliteration: "Jigen o koete" (Japanese: 次元を越えて)	Yūji Yamaguchi	Hiroshi Yamaguchi	Kōjin Ochi	July 26, 1997
27	"Great Tokyo Destruction"; Transliteration: "Dai-Tōkyō shōmetsu!" (Japanese: 大東京消滅！)	Nana Harada	Yoshitake Suzuki	Susumu Nishizawa	August 2, 1997
28	"Crash! The Big Four of Destruction"; Transliteration: "Gekitotsu! Kikai shitennō" (Japanese: 激突！機界四天王)	Kunihiro Mori	Yūichirō Takeda	Mamoru Hamatsu	August 9, 1997
29	"Phoenix"; Transliteration: "Hi no tori" (Japanese: 火の鳥)	Akihiko Nishiyama	Yūichirō Takeda	Hiroshi Nishikiori	August 16, 1997
30	"Braves, Death at Dawn!"; Transliteration: "Yūsha, akatsuki ni shisu!" (Japanese: 勇者、暁に死す！)	Gorō Taniguchi	Hiroshi Yamaguchi	Gorō Taniguchi	August 23, 1997
31	"Adieu, GGG"; Transliteration: "Saraba GGG" (Japanese: さらばGGG)	Yūji Yamaguchi	Hiroaki Kitajima	Yūji Yamaguchi; Yoshitomo Yonetani	August 30, 1997
32	"Counterattack! Machine World 31 Primevals"; Transliteration: "Gyakushū! Kikai 31 genshu" (Japanese: 逆襲！機界31原種)	Shinji Takamatsu	Yūichirō Takeda	Shinji Takamatsu	September 13, 1997
33	"Departure to the Freezing Point"; Transliteration: "Hyōtenka e no tabidachi" (Japanese: 氷点下への出航)	Takeshi Yoshimoto	Hiroshi Yamaguchi	Atsuko Kase	September 20, 1997
34	"Brave's Rebirth"; Transliteration: "Yūsha fukkatsu" (Japanese: 勇者復活！)	Nana Harada	Hiroshi Yamaguchi	Setsuo Takase	September 27, 1997
35	"Wind and Lightning"; Transliteration: "Kaze to ikazuchi" (Japanese: 風と雷)	Akihiko Nishiyama	Yūichirō Takeda	Gorō Taniguchi	October 4, 1997
36	"Its Name is GekiRyuJin"; Transliteration: "Sono na wa Gekiryūjin" (Japanese: その名は撃龍神)	Setsuo Takase	Yūichirō Takeda	Masamitsu Hidaka	October 11, 1997
37	"The Coming of Cain"; Transliteration: "Kain raigō" (Japanese: カイン来迎)	Yūji Yamaguchi	Hiroaki Kitajima	Yūji Yamaguchi; Gorō Taniguchi	October 18, 1997
38	"The Great Battle of Darkness"; Transliteration: "Ankoku no daikessen" (Japanese: 暗黒の大決戦)	Kunihisa Sugishima	Hiroaki Kitajima	Kunihisa Sugishima	October 25, 1997
39	"Machine World's Greatest 7 Primevals"; Transliteration: "Kikai saikyō 7 genshu" (Japanese: 機界最強7原種)	Shinji Takamatsu	Hiroshi Yamaguchi	Shinji Takamatsu	November 8, 1997
40	"Children of the Stars"; Transliteration: "Hoshi no kodomo-tachi" (Japanese: 星の子供たち)	Takeshi Yoshimoto	Hiroshi Yamaguchi	Mitsuru Hongo	November 15, 1997
41	"A Distant Victory Song"; Transliteration: "Haruka naru gaika" (Japanese: 遥かなる凱歌)	Nana Harada	Hiroshi Yamaguchi	Atsuko Kase	November 22, 1997
42	"Return From Ancient Times"; Transliteration: "Taiko kara no kikan" (Japanese: 太古からの帰還)	Akihiko Nishiyama	Hiroaki Kitajima	Mamoru Hamatsu	November 29, 1997
43	"GenRyuJin, GoRyuJin"; Transliteration: "Genryūjin, Gōryūjin" (Japanese: 幻竜神・強龍神)	Setsuo Takase	Hiroaki Kitajima	Akira Nishimori	December 6, 1997
44	"Prelude to the Coming of Death"; Transliteration: "Shūen jokyoku" (Japanese: 終焉序曲)	Shinji Takamatsu	Yūichirō Takeda	Shinji Takamatsu	December 13, 1997
45	"GGG, Towards Jupiter!"; Transliteration: "GGG, Mokusei e!" (Japanese: GGG、木星へ！)	Yasuhiro Minami	Yūichirō Takeda	Ryūji Kawamura	December 20, 1997
46	"That With Courage"; Transliteration: "Yūki aru mono" (Japanese: 勇気ある者)	Yūji Yamaguchi	Yūichirō Takeda	Yūji Yamaguchi	December 27, 1997
47	"Machine World Termination"; Transliteration: "Kikai shōka shūketsu" (Japanese: 機界昇華終結)	Takeshi Yoshimoto	Yūichirō Takeda	Masamitsu Hidaka	January 10, 1998
48	"Life"; Transliteration: "Inochi" (Japanese: 命)	Gorō Taniguchi	Hiroaki Kitajima	Gorō Taniguchi	January 24, 1998
49	"Someday, in the Sea of Stars"; Transliteration: "Itsuka hoshi no umi de" (Japanese: いつか星の海で)	Yoshitomo Yonetani	Hiroshi Yamaguchi	Yoshitomo Yonetani	January 31, 1998

=== Video games ===
The series received a video game spinoff titled The King of Braves GaoGaiGar: Blockaded Numbers (勇者王ガオガイガー BLOCKADED NUMBERS, Yūsha Ō Gaogaigā Burokēdeddo nanbāzu) which was published by Takara and released for the PlayStation on April 8, 1999. The series also appeared in Takara's other video game series: 2000's Brave Saga 2 for the PlayStation, 2001's Brave Saga New Astaria for the Game Boy Color and 2005's New Century Brave Wars for the PlayStation 2. The series also made appearances in the Sunrise Eiyuutan series. GaoGaiGar has later appeared in the long running Super Robot Wars franchise, beginning with the 2nd Super Robot Wars Alpha.

=== Novel ===
A novel spinoff titled Queen of Leo <Leon Reine>: The King of Braves Gaogaigar 2005 (獅子の女王 ―リオン・レーヌ― 勇者王ガオガイガー2005, Shishi no Joō Rion Rēnu Yūsha Ō Gaogaigā 2005) was published by Media Factory on December 1, 2003, written by Yuichiro Takeda and illustrated by Takahiro Kimura and Seiichi Nakatani. The novel takes place after the events of the series and before the events of FINAL, focusing on Renais Kaldiff Shishioh, her origins and her fight against the criminal organization named BioNet.

== See also ==
- The King of Braves GaoGaiGar Final
- Betterman

Preceded by Brave Command Dagwon	Brave series 1997–1998	Succeeded by Betterman; The King of Braves GaoGaiGar Final
