= Salem Amri =

Algerian footballer (born 1948)

Salem Amri (born November 28, 1948, in Ain El Hammam, Tizi Ouzou Province) is a retired Algerian football player that played as a striker.

== Club career ==
- 1966-1971 WA Rouiba (Algeria)
- 1972-1982 JS Kabylie (Algeria)

== Honours ==
- Won the African Cup of Champions Clubs once with JS Kabylie in 1981
- Won the Algerian League four times with JS Kabylie in 1973, 1974, 1977 and 1980
- Won the Algerian Cup once with JS Kabylie in 1977
- Won the Algerian Super Cup once with JS Kabylie in 1973
