= Lamia Moubayed Bissat =

Lebanese public servant

- Born: March 27, 1967 (age 59); Beirut, Lebanon
- Occupation: President of Institut des Finances Basil Fuleihan

Lamia Moubayed Bissat (born March 27, 1967, in Beirut, Lebanon) is a Lebanese-French expert in public policy, institutional reform, and governance in Lebanon, the Middle East, and Africa. Since 2003, she has served as President of the Institut des Finances Basil Fuleihan, the training and policy institute of the Lebanese Ministry of Finance, and a regional center specializing in governance and public financial management (PFM).

Twice nominated by the United Nations Secretary-General António Guterres, she served as Vice-Chairperson of the United Nations Committee of Experts on Public Administration (CEPA) for two consecutive mandates between 2018 and 2024.[3] Moubayed has worked with the International Monetary Fund, the World Bank, the Organisation for Economic Co-operation and Development, and governments across the Middle East and Africa, working on institutional reform, public procurement, public financial management, and sustainable development in fragile and conflict-affected settings.[4]

Moubayed is a founding figure of the GIFT-MENA network of public finance and civil service training schools in the Middle East and North Africa [5] and co-founded the MENAPAR research network on public administration. [6] She also contributed to the establishment of public finance institutes in Palestine, Jordan, Morocco, Yemen, Iraq, Djibouti, and Libya. [7]

Moubayed is a recipient of France's Chevalier de la Légion d'Honneur (2015) [8] and Chevalier de l'Ordre National du Mérite (2004). [9]

In 2022, Moubayed published her first novel, Leyla, or the Meaning to Be Out of Place, which explores themes of identity, exile, belonging, and memory. [10]

== Early life and education ==
Lamia Moubayed was born on March 27, 1967, in Beirut, Lebanon. [11] She holds a Bachelor of Science degree in Agricultural Engineering (1988) and a Master of Agricultural Economics and Development (1990), both from the American University of Beirut. [12] Upon graduating, she was awarded the Sana Najjar-Zahr Prize for best student performance by the American University of Beirut in June 1988. [13]

== Career ==
Moubayed began her career in 1992, as a researcher for the Consultation and Research Institute in Lebanon, a firm specialized in business consultation and quantitative and qualitative field studies regarding social and economic development in Lebanon and the MENA region. In 1995, Lamia Moubayed joined the United Nations Development Program in Beirut as a program officer. In July 1999, Moubayed joined the United Nations Economic and Social Commission for West Asia under the jurisdiction of the United Nations Economic and Social Council (ECOSOC).

In 2000, the French Ministry of Economy and Finance selected and appointed Moubayed to become head and director of the Institut des Finances Basil Fuleihan in Lebanon. Moubayed lectures public management at the Institute of Political Sciences of Université Saint Joseph in Beirut.

In 2018, she was nominated by UN Secretary General Antonio Guterres to serve a four-year term as one of 24 experts on the UN Committee of Experts on Public Administration and was approved in 2021 by ECOSOC to serve the position starting August 1, 2021. Moubayed supports enhancing capacity building in the public procurement unit. In 2020, she took part in the launch of the 2020 United Nations E-Government Survey organized by the UN Department of Economic and Social Affairs.

Moubayed is a founding and a secretariat member through the Institute of Finance, of the GIFT-MENA network of civil service training schools in the Middle East and North Africa, established in 2006 and currently based in Beirut. She also contributed to founding the MENAPAR network of research in public administration, currently based in Bahrain.

Moubayed inaugurated a public library that includes more than twenty-three thousand references accessible to the public and initiated a series of citizen guides to increase awareness on public financial management issues and facilitate citizen transactions entitled "Fiscal and Financial Awareness Series".

== Memberships ==
Starting in 2016, Moubayed became the representative of Lebanon and MENA countries on the board of the “International Association of Schools and Institutes of Administration:

- Founding member – Green line, (1991 - Present).
- Member – American University of Beirut Alumni Association, (1996 - Present).
- Member – Engineers and Architects Syndicate, (1996 - Present).
- Member – Network for Innovators in Governance in the Mediterranean Region, (2003 - Present).
- Chair – Governance of Public Finance component of OECD-MENA initiative, (2009 - Present).
- Founding member – Roads for Life "The Talal Kassem Fund for Post-Accident Care", (2011–Present).
- Member – World Bank Group Regional Committee of Experts on Public Procurement, (April 2013 – Present).

== Awards and recognition ==
- Chevalier de La Légion d’Honneur (July 13, 2015).
- Chevalier de l’Ordre National du Mérite (June 4, 2004).
- Sana Najjar-Zahr Award for Best Student Performance, American University of Beirut (June 1988).

== Publications ==
- "L'Institut des Finances, 20 ans de cooperation administrative franco-libanaise", L. Moubayed.
- "Un réseau des écoles de la fonction publique en méditérranée peut-il servir l'agenda de la gouvernance publique?", L. Moubayed.
- “L’avenir de l’Action Publique: Regards croisées autour de la méditerranée”, L. Moubayed, V. Potier & AB. Yakhlef.
- “From Government to Governance: How Will the Arab Region Meet the Goals of Sustainable Development in the Post 2015 Period?”.
- “Building capacities in public financial management in a post-conflict country: A practice from the Ministry of Finance and the Institute of Finance of Lebanon”, I. Ghandour, S. Hatem, L. Moubayed Bissat & C. Rihan.
- “Lebanon’s Experiment with Installing Competitive Recruitment”, L. Moubayed Bissat, S. Hatem & C. Rihan.
- “Why Civil Service Reform is Inevitable in Times of Crisis”, L. Moubayed Bissat.
- “Introducing a Gender-Driven Approach to Performance Budgeting: Austria”, L. Moubayed Bissat & M. Bsaibes.
- “Measuring the Public Sector Wage Bill”, L. Moubayed Bissat & I. Ghandour.
- "The role of civil society in Rural Community Development: Two case studies from Lebanon”.
- “Rural Community Development through Strengthening Institution Building: Two Case Studies from Lebanon”.
- "Citizen Budget 2018", Institut des Finances Basil Fuleihan.
- "Citizen Budget 2019", Institut des Finances Basil Fuleihan.
- "Citizen Budget 2020", Institut des Finances Basil Fuleihan.
- "The Economic Cost of Policy Action against the Outbreak Scenarios of Covid-19 in Lebanon", Institut des Finances Basil Fuleihan.
- "The economic and fiscal policies in the Era of Riad El Solh", Institut des Finances Basil Fuleihan.
- "L'approche par competences peut-elle changer l’avenir de la Fonction Publique Libanaise?"
