= Lamiya Abed Khadawi =

Iraqi politician

- Died: 27 April 2005; Baghdad
- Cause of death: Assassination by shooting
- Occupation: Member of parliament

Lamiya Abed Khadawi (died 27 April 2005) was an Iraqi politician and member of parliament. She was shot dead on her doorstep in Baghdad on 27 April 2005. Khadawi was the first MP killed since the January elections.

== Career ==
Khadawi was a member of Iraq's National Assembly. She was elected to the parliament in the general elections held in January 2005. She was also part of the former Iraqi prime minister Iyad Allawi's List Party.
