= Betterman (TV series) =

Japanese anime television series

- ベターマン
- Genre: Action, horror, mecha
- Created by: Hajime Yatate; Yoshitomo Yonetani
- Developed by: Hiroshi Yamaguchi
- Directed by: Yoshitomo Yonetani
- Music by: Kohei Tanaka
- Country of origin: Japan
- Original language: Japanese
- No. of episodes: 26

Production
- Producers: Hiroyuki Orukawa; Shinichiro Kobayashi
- Production companies: JVC; Sunrise

Original release
- Network: TV Tokyo
- Release: 1 April – 30 September 1999

Betterman (Japanese: ベターマン, Hepburn: Betāman) is a Japanese anime television series produced by Sunrise. It is a spinoff of Brave series' GaoGaiGar, produced under the direction of Yoshitomo Yonetani and writer Hiroshi Yamaguchi. It aired on TV Tokyo from April 1, 1999, to September 30, 1999, and was the first anime to broadcast in widescreen, though it was letterboxed.

== Plot ==
In the year 2006, the world is affected by a mysterious disease dubbed "Algernon" that causes mass suicides and murders. Meanwhile, while preparing for the opening ceremony at the geofront underground amusement park "Bottom the World", a mysterious mass fatality accident occurs. Mayo Tsuko of the Algernon research institute Mode Warp, who came to investigate with the police, concludes that Algernon was the cause of the accident. At the same time, Keita Aono accidentally enters the closed Bottom the World. As he wanders, he encounters a gigantic humanoid mecha (or "neuronoid") called "Kakuseijin 01". In the cockpit is his childhood friend Hinoki Sai, who he broke up with when he was young, as a head diver.

Kakuseijin 01 was stranded after Hinoki's partner, the head diver Cactus Prickle, suddenly disappeared. Attraction robots that have gone out of control attack them. Keita suddenly gets into the cockpit of Kakuseijin 01, and along with Hinoki, uses Kakuseijin 01 to fight off the robots. In order to escape from Bottom the World, Keita cooperates with Hinoki and searches for the missing Cactus.

=== Shared continuity with The King of Braves GaoGaiGar ===
Betterman takes place in the same world as The King of Braves GaoGaiGar, predominantly before the events of The King of Braves GaoGaiGar FINAL, though only a few minor links are visually made within the series itself. The novel series King of Kings: GaoGaiGar VS Betterman fully explains the connection between two series and how both events overlap each other.

== Characters ==
=== Protagonists ===
- Keita Aono (蒼斧蛍汰, Aono Keita) – The main human protagonist of the series, whose point of view most of the story is seen from. Keita is a seventeen-year-old high school student who, through a chance reunion with his childhood friend Hinoki, finds himself recruited as a Head Diver for Akamatsu Industries. He is quite different from the typical mecha pilot seen in most anime, being rather awkward and prone to panicking easily. However, on multiple occasions, he shows his willingness to place himself in danger to protect those he cares about. He has especially high readings as a Dual Kind, and at one point is even able to pilot a Neuronoid by himself. This is a result of a transplant of dura mater he received as an infant, due to a serious head injury, from a woman named Laurier Noir. Although he shows an attraction to several girls throughout the series, he is especially fond of Hinoki, and makes no secret of his desire to pursue a relationship with her, despite the rather apathetic attitude she often displays towards him. Voiced by: Kappei Yamaguchi (Japanese); Matthew Erickson (English).
- Hinoki Sai (彩火乃紀, Sai Hinoki) – The daughter of a famous paleontologist, who was orphaned when her parents and older brother vanished during an expedition to the Ajanta Caves in India four years before the start of the series. She was recruited as a Head Diver by Akamatsu and Mode Warp shortly thereafter. Hinoki acts in a sullen manner a majority of the time, and often derides her own intelligence when asked questions that she can not, or does not wish to, answer. She is a childhood friend of Keita, but had not seen him in some time before their reunion in the first episode. Although she usually acts uninterested in his romantic advances, she shows on several occasions that she cares more for him than she lets on. She also refers to him affectionately as "Kei-chan". She, like Keita, is seventeen when the series begins. Voiced by: Kyōko Hikami (Japanese); Onalea Gilbertson (English).
- Shigeru Akamatsu (阿嘉松滋, Akamatsu Shigeru) – The founder and president of Akamatsu Industries. His company worked with Mode Warp in developing the Neuronoids, and he actively assists in their attempt to eliminate Algernon. He has an extremely inventive mind, and many of his company's products, which range from toys to military weapons, were his own ideas. His dedication to his company, however, caused his wife to leave him some time earlier, which still bothers him on occasion. Voiced by: Chafurin (Japanese); Dave Pettitt (English)
- Sakura Akamatsu – Shigeru's fifteen-year-old daughter. She was born with the ability to tap into the "Limpid Channel", allowing her to pick up the waves of consciousness in the air around her. By picking up the random thoughts of other beings, she is able to give useful, seemingly precognitive, information, though often in a cryptic manner. However, she was also born with extremely poor health, and she spends much of her time confined in a special chair, known as a "Manage Machine". Although she is a Dual Kind, she only is used as a Head Diver in emergency situations, due to her weak constitution. Voiced by: Junko Iwao (Japanese); Mariette Sluyter (English).
- Miyako Asami (都古麻御, Miyako Asami) – A Bio-medical Engineer who works for Mode Warp. She works closely with Akamatsu Industries in trying to understand and eliminate Algernon. She was recruited by the mysterious "Director" to take part in the Dive Inspection several years earlier, and thus is familiar with several of the antagonists in the series. Voiced by: Houko Kuwashima (Japanese); Meredith Taylor-Parry (English).
- Shou Yanagi (八七木翔, Yanagi Shō) – A 24-year-old Head Diver, who is usually partnered with Kaede. Although he often shows a collected personality in front of others, he suffers from psychological trauma from when his younger brother was killed in an accident while testing early Neuronoid models. Seeing Keita reminds him of his brother, causing him to break down on several occasions. He is a powerful hypnotist, and is able to hypnotize others merely by looking into their eyes. Voiced by: Shinichiro Miki (Japanese); Jonathan Love (English).
- Kaede Kurenai (紅楓, Kurenai Kaede) – Shou's partner, and a powerful psychic. Her dowsing abilities are a great asset in her role as a Head Diver. She has a past connection with Mammon and the Superhuman Federation, and much of the latter part of the series deals with their attempts to harness her powers. Voiced by: Yuko Minaguchi (Japanese); Colleen Blackmore (English).
- Ritsuko Fuchu (府中律子, Fuchū Ritsuko) – Ri-chan is Voiced by: Tomoko Kawakami (Japanese); Christy Greene (English).
- Yamajii (山じい, Yamajii) – Yamajii is Voiced by: Takehito Koyasu (Japanese); Ben Jeffrey (English).
- Lamia (ラミア, Ramia) – The Betterman who the series in named for. Lamia often shows up when the human protagonists are in danger, transforming into one of his fighting forms to save them. He seems especially intent on saving Hinoki, whose brother he bears more than a passing resemblance to. It is later explained that by eating the Vivele Fruit that grew from Hinoki's brother, he inherited his memories, as well as some of his physical attributes. His ultimate goal is to defeat Kankel, the enemy to all life on Earth and protect Hinoki, whom he believes may also produce the revolutionary Vivele Fruit. Voiced by: Takehito Koyasu (Japanese); Jonathan Love (English).
- Seeme (セーメ, Sēme) – Lamia's constant companion, who usually takes the form of a large, yellow, moth-like creature. She occasionally is seen in a larger, four-legged form as well. In extreme situations, she takes the form of Betterman Lume by consuming pieces of the seed that came from Hinoki's mother, appearing as a glowing female figure. Voiced by: Tomoko Kawakami (Japanese); M.J. McCann (English).
- Bodaiju (ボダイジュ, Bodaiju) – Another Betterman who appears later in the series. He has a much darker skin tone and dresses in the raiments reminiscent of a monk. Like Lamia though, he has the tell tale characteristics of his species with red sclera, telepathic communication, and, of course, the ability to take on different fighting forms. He first appears to confront Lamia. Bodiju chastises the latter for twice breaking the taboo regarding Forte (Lamia transformed into Forte twice by then when his people regard the Forte Seed as weapon reserved for the use of a "leader"). He is also critical of Lamia's quest to protect Hinoki, thinking such efforts would be better spent in the fight against the force named Kankel. The confrontation turns into a battle between Lamia's Nebula form and Bodiju's Turba. The fight ends in a draw, but Bodiju confronts Lamia once more. After working together to survive a psychic's illusion, Bodiju agrees to assist Lamia and Seeme. The alliance is short lived as he is later slain by Kankel. Later on he psychically aides Lamia, bringing him the necessary components of the seed of Oltus (elaborating on his rivalry with Lamia by asking the latter if he can handle Oltus). Voiced by: Kazuki Yao
- Yakusugi (ヤクスギ, Yakusugi) – A mysterious priest, rumoured to be over a hundred and twenty years old, who appears to offer aid to the protagonists at unexpected times. Through his extreme physical and psychological training, he has managed to become the pinnacle of human ability. As such, he was selected as the test subject of the Dive Inspection. However, he vanished when the experiment went wrong. Kankel was born from him as a result, and though he is connected to the creature, even Yakusugi can not keep it contained. Voiced by: Yusaku Yara (Japanese); David Kelly (English)
- Chandi (チャンディー, Chandī) – A mysterious girl, though not having a large part in the series, she's one of the lizard girl experiments. She gained her own will and appears on a few occasions to save Keita. Voiced by: Houko Kuwashima (Japanese); Onalea Gilbertson (English)

=== Antagonists ===
- Kazuho Heichi (平地一穂, Heichi Kazuho)- An employee of Akamatsu Industries, who attempts to kill his co-workers on several occasions after contracting Algernon. He reprograms various types of machines and robots to attack his former friends, which results in the battles of the first several episodes. After being apprehended, he is later killed and used to grow an Animus Flower by BPL. Voiced by: Houko Kuwashima (Japanese); Dan Gascon (English)
- Prof. Umezaki (梅崎, Umezaki)- The head scientist of BPL, who took part in the Dive Inspection several years ago. Although his laboratory is said to be developing new food sources, he is actually developing various biological monsters, which he uses to attack Mode Warp and Akamatsu Industries' employees. His biological creatures, which range from massive beasts to killer insects, are the primary threat of much of the first half of the series. He is killed during the protagonists' attempt to attack his lab when one of his own creations, which has gained self will, turns on him. Voiced by: Osamu Ichikawa (Japanese); Steve Olson (English)
- Mugito Mamon (魔門麦人, Mamon Mugito)- A powerful psychic, and the leader of the Superhuman Federation. His attempts to harness Kaede's powers are the main threat faced by the protagonists in the second half of the series. Mamon is a survivor of the Dive Inspection who still hopes to create a superior human being through psychic powers. He eventually does harness Kaede's powers long enough to transform himself into the powerful Brahman, though he still falls to Lamia during the final battle of the series. Voiced by: Mugihito (Japanese); Doug McKeag (English)
- Kankel (カンケル, Kankeru)- A mysterious, incredibly powerful being, which appears as a somewhat effeminate, shadow-like creature. It is the unexpected result of the Dive Inspection, made up entirely of cancerous cells. As such, it seeks to consume all other life and assimilate it into itself, beginning with the Bettermen, which it recognizes as its biggest threat. It is Lamia's ultimate goal to defeat this creature, which he manages to do only by transforming into the ultimate Betterman, OLTUS.

== Betterman's transformations ==
Betterman NEBULA
Distinctly recognizable by its massive forearms which serve as highly resilient guards against enemy attacks. Nebula's form grants Lamia aerial capabilities and allows him to fly at high-velocity speeds. The signature ability of Nebula, Psycho Voice, first allows Lamia to analyze his opponent's complete physical structure and to retaliate with a high-pitched voice attack which uses the same wavelength as his enemy's composition, thus eliminating it. This is the most frequently used transformation by Lamia and has shown itself to be the most versatile.
Betterman AQUA
This is an underwater form that can achieve a speed of 600 knots (1,100 km/h). In this form Betterman can inhale and analyze his opponent's bodily liquids and attack with similar Psycho Fluid, breaking down the opponent's DNA structure.
Betterman TURBA
This orange form of Betterman uses compressed air and razor sharp wind as weapons. Turba's capability is Psycho Calm. In this attack, wind and sound are compressed into a small spherical area. This makes attacks such as Psycho Voice ineffective. The same organs can be used for jet propulsion. It should be also noted that this is a form that Betterman Lamia does not use. Instead it was used by Bodiju (he specifically chose it to counter Nebula).
Betterman LUME
This bright yellow female form of Betterman uses electromagnetic radiation (electricity and various rays) as its weapons. Seeme transforms into this form by consuming pieces of the seed that came from Hinoki's mother.
Betterman FORTE
This is the strongest type of body that Betterman can obtain with common seeds. In this form Betterman greatly increases in height. Forte's method of defeating an opponent involves seeing an opponent's "breaking point" and using the Sliding Saber on his head to strike in this location (referred to as Psycho Glory). Opponents are then reduced to ash. It is also notable that Forte-type Betterman should be used only by "a leader", but Betterman Lamia has broken this rule more than once.
Betterman OLTUS
This the final and ultimate form which Lamia adopts in the final episode. Like "Forte," Betterman grows in size and gains a dark brown color opposing the white "Nebula." Using the ultimate power of "Psycho Burst", Betterman can regenerate his cells indefinitely; even if thrown into molten lava. Lamia gains the power of Oltus when his Master, friend, and his companion give him three seeds, which combine into one. After this, Lamia confronts the final enemy, "Bestman."

== Glossary ==
- Algernon – A strange disease of unknown cause that was named after the person who first discovered it and died from it. Infected people may have a mental breakdown and become homicidal or suicidal, but they may continue to act logically with their usual personalities until they achieve their goals. Because they take no action other than concealing their needs and objectives, the ATP in their bodies is used up, and the infected person will eventually die. Aya, Asami, Cactus, Umezaki, Mamon, and Officer, who had the life-killing impulse prion protein burned into their brains during a dive inspection, scattered it all over the world and infected everyone they met with the impulse, causing its spread. Mamon proposes that Algernon is not a disease or phenomenon, but a DNA program with the purpose of guiding the human race through the course of evolution.
- Animus Flower – A strange flower that grows from the heads of those who died while infected with Algernon. The fruit that these flowers bear is what a Betterman consumes to transform. Animus as Jungian term means "true inner self", more precisely women's inner masculinity. Animus seeds in Betterman are physical methods of releasing one's inner self in various forms.
- Best Man Project – A project, organized by a man known only as "Director", to create a perfect, immortal human. Specialists from various fields were gathered for this project, which culminated in the Dive Inspection. After the experiment's failure, the survivors of the project split up, creating various organizations to continue the pursuit of human perfection on their own. Mode Warp, BPL, and the Superhuman Federation were all founded in this manner.
- BPL – One of the spinoffs of the Best Man Project, founded and headed by Prof. Umezaki. Although its original intent was to create new food sources, it wound up only creating biological horrors.
- Dive Inspection – The ultimate goal of the Best Man Project, where scientists and other experts attempted to create a perfect, immortal human. Using Priest Yakusugi as a test subject, they attempted to rewrite his DNA to cause his cells to reproduce infinitely, effectively making him immortal. However, something went wrong during the experiment, and many people present were killed. Unknown to the participants, their experiment resulted in the creation of the destructive being known as Kankel.
- Dual Kind – Individuals who can connect their minds to another using a special substance known as Linker Gel. By combining their neural energy, two dual kind can create a large amount of power. Aside from this, dual kind have no other special powers or abilities. It can be argued that Dual Kinds have limited access to the collective unconscious.
- Head Diver – Dual Kind that pilot Neuronoids.
- Mode Warp – One of the groups that splintered from the Best Man Project. Mode Warp works closely with Akamatsu Industries in creating the Neuronoids and battling the threat of Algernon. The only notable member of this group is Miyako Asami.
- Neuronoid – Robots jointly created by Akamatsu Industries and Mode Warp. As the machine is powered by Linker Gel, two Dual Kind are required to pilot it. Each Neuronoid has two forms: The "Accept Mode", which is equipped with a variety of sensors used for surveying and analysis, and the "Active Mode", used in combat situations. A Neuronoid's most powerful ability is the Synapse Attack, where particles from the environment surrounding the machine are drawn in, and then unleashed in a powerful blast. Due to the rate at which Linker Gel becomes unusable, the Neuronoids can only remain active for a short time, which is one of their major handicaps. Neuronoids use living brain matter in their construction. Although human brains were originally used in early models, the current Neuronoids piloted by the protagonists use the brains of primates and dolphins.
- NEO – New Environment Organization, parent company of Mode Warp.
- Superhuman Federation – One of the groups that splintered off from the Best Man Project, made up of individuals with psychic abilities. Although they use their abilities for business purposes, their true goal is to continue the work of the Best Man Project, and create a superior being. Bakuto Mammon, the leader of the organization, is especially interested in recruiting Kaede for this.

== Episodes ==
No.	Title	Directed by	Written by	Storyboarded by	Original release date	U.S. air date
1	"-DARK-" (Japanese: 闇-YAMI-)	Yoshitomo Yonetani	Hiroshi Yamaguchi	Yoshitomo Yonetani	April 1, 1999	February 11, 2003
Despite oversleeping, high school student Keita Aono manages to escape punishment by arriving at class before his teacher. He also witnesses the arrival of an attractive new student. As the other boys greet Hinoki Sai with delight, Keita remembers her from a strange dream he had that morning. He then recognizes her as a long-lost childhood friend. His attempts to reminisce with her after class are foiled, however, first by the crowd that gathers around her, and then by her sudden disappearance into an armored vehicle owned by Akamatsu Industries. Keita's string of bad luck only continues after school, as he is caught in a downpour and loses control of his scooter, plummeting down a flight of stairs into a new underground amusement park. Bottom World's grand opening has been delayed by the deaths of 200 workers earlier that day, and Keita's clumsiness means he may share their fate. His attempts to escape only lead him deeper into the park and into peril as he is pursued by monsters. He finally comes across a giant robot operated by Hinoki. Climbing aboard, Keita takes the place of her missing co-pilot and the two bravely fight off all comers until they run out of fuel just before facing their most frightening challenge.
2	"-VOICE-" (Japanese: 声-KOE-)	Takeshi Yamamoto	Hiroshi Yamaguchi	Yoshitomo Yonetani	April 8, 1999	February 12, 2003
Rescued from what seemed like certain death by the mysterious Betterman, Keita finds himself drawn deeper into the battle against Algernon.
3	"-SKY-" (Japanese: 宙-SORA-)	Akira Yoshimura	Hiroshi Yamaguchi	Hiroshi Nishikiori	April 15, 1999	February 13, 2003
Keita must undergo tests to see if he truly possesses the abilities Akamatsu Industries needs him to have, but will he make it to the lab alive?
4	"-WAKE UP-" (Japanese: 醒-MEZAME-)	Kunihisa Sugishima	Yuichiro Takeda	Kunihisa Sugishima	April 22, 1999	February 14, 2003
Hinoki and Keita return to school after a hectic weekend, but things are not any safer for them there.
5	"-HELL-" (Japanese: 冥-ZIGOKU-)	Yasuhiro Minami	Yuichiro Takeda	Akira Kusune	April 29, 1999	February 15, 2003
The pursuit of Algernon leads the Akamatsu Industries team to Bottom World.
6	"-SPIRIT-" (Japanese: 霊-KODAMA-)	Ikuro Sato	Hiroshi Yamaguchi	Kazuyoshi Katayama	May 6, 1999	February 15, 2003
The pursuit of Algernon leads to India, but the team may not make it back home.
7	"POWER -FORTE-" (Japanese: 力-FORTE-)	Akira Yoshimura	Hiroshi Yamaguchi	Masamitsu Hidaka	May 13, 1999	February 15, 2003
What does it mean for the Akamatsu Industries team when even Betterman cannot defeat the Behemoth?
8	"-POISON-" (Japanese: 毒-DOKU-)	Takeshi Yoshimoto	Yuichiro Takeda	Takeshi Yoshimoto	May 20, 1999	February 15, 2003
Barely clinging to life, Betterman somehow manages to reach out for the seed that lets him mutate into Forte, his strongest form yet. He again takes on the Behemoth with greater success, enabling the Akamatsu Industries team to escape the crumbling Ajanta caves. Everyone manages to make it out alive, but the trip has taken its toll on Sakura, who upon awakening from a strange dream finds herself in a hospital bed surrounded by her friends. Keita decides to pay her a visit after school, but Hinoki peculiarly opts not to join him. His visit is a short one, however, as a nurse whisks Sakura away for some more treatment. Before she goes, Sakura makes Keita promise to stay until she gets back. While coming back from the bathroom, Keita opens the wrong door and stumbles upon shelves filled with jars of fingernails. Taking exception to his strange discovery is a nurse armed with long razorlike nails, and she begins to chase him. He manages to escape, freeing Sakura along the way, while also meeting up with Hinoki, who has had an apparent change of heart about visiting her ill friend. Hinoki does not say much before collapsing, bloody scratches running the length of her back. Standing behind her is an army of nurses, each armed with poisonous fingernails.
9	(Japanese: 海-AQUA-)	Ikuro Sato	Hiroaki Kitajima	Koji Masunari	May 27, 1999	February 22, 2003
Investigating the hospital attack leads Akamatsu Industries out to sea and aboard a mysterious freighter, but will being short one team member prove deadly?
10	"-INSECT-" (Japanese: 蟲-MUSHI-)	Hirokazu Yamada	Hiroshi Yamaguchi	Shinichi Watanabe	June 10, 1999	February 22, 2003
What initially seemed like much-needed rest back at Akamatsu Industry headquarters turns into disaster.
11	(Japanese: 霧-NEBULA-)	Ikuro Sato	Yuichiro Takeda	Yoshitomo Yonetani	June 17, 1999	February 22, 2003
Akamatsu Industries and Mode Warp part ways, but a clean break may be too much to ask for.
12	(Japanese: 龍-DRAGON-)	Akira Yoshimura	Yuichiro Takeda	Masamitsu Hidaka	June 24, 1999	February 22, 2003
The Akamatsu Industries team is drawn back into action when Miyako Asami goes missing.
13	"-NECTAR-" (Japanese: 蜜-MITSU-)	Sumio Watanabe	Hiroaki Kitajima	Takeshi Yoshimoto	July 1, 1999	March 1, 2003
The battle continues unsuccessfully against Dr. Umezaki and his insects.
14	"-HEART-" (Japanese: 魂-KOKORO-)	Akihiko Nishiyama	Hiroaki Kitajima	Masamitsu Hidaka	July 8, 1999	March 1, 2003
A brutal showdown commences in the laboratory of Dr. Umezaki.
15	"-SHADOW-" (Japanese: 翳-KAGE-)	Akira Yoshimura	Hiroshi Yamaguchi	Yoshitomo Yonetani	July 15, 1999	March 1, 2003
Keita and Hinoki's date is interrupted by a strange figure.
16	"-REALITY-" (Japanese: 現-UTSUTSU-)	Hirokazu Yamada	Hiroshi Yamaguchi	Yukio Nishimoto	July 22, 1999	March 1, 2003
Yanagi, once again plagued by nightmares, disappears for a second time. He eventually turns up at Akamatsu Industries, where he crashes a truck carrying the Tyran through a garage door, nearly running over Mr. Akamatsu in the process. Kaede, knowing what ails him, intercepts him along the road and jumps into the truck. Yanagi's dreams call him to an abandoned factory, where he and Kaede are attacked by three neuronoids, the three shadows from across the sea that Sakura has predicted would strike. The neuronoids are three malfunctioning prototypes that ModeWarp was set to dismantle, but were stolen from ModeWarp France's headquarters, and no one knows how the thieves did it. Although they have no pilots and little fuel, they fight the Tyran and show no signs of slowing down. Yanagi knows what is operating them, but is not pleased with the answer. Betterman, meanwhile, is having his own difficulties. Another of his kind, a being called Bodaiju, does not think Betterman is being true to his original mission. He thinks Betterman is spending too much time protecting Keita and Hinoki when he should be fighting something called Kankel, and he takes it upon himself to destroy his rival. Unfortunately for Keita and Hinoki, Bodaiju seems to have accomplished his goal.
17	"-DREAM-" (Japanese: 夢-YUME-)	Ikuro Sato	Yuichiro Takeda	Mamoru Hamatsu	July 29, 1999	March 8, 2003
The Akamatsu Industries team experiences a series of nightmares and become unable to discern them and reality.
18	"-HUNGRY-" (Japanese: 飢-KAWAKI-)	Atsushi Takada	Hiroaki Kitajima	Yasuchika Nagaoka	August 5, 1999	March 8, 2003
Keita and Hinoki's teammates turn into flesh-eating zombies.
19	"MIRROR -LIE-" (Japanese: 鏡-ITSUWARI-)	Sumio Watanabe	Hiroshi Yamaguchi	Sumio Watanabe	August 19, 1999	March 8, 2003
An organization trying to recruit Kaede away from Akamatsu Industries resorts to dirty tactics.
20	"-TRICK-" (Japanese: 罠-WANA-)	Akira Yoshimura	Hiroshi Yamaguchi	Yoshitomo Yonetani	August 26, 1999	March 8, 2003
A confrontation with the Superhuman Federation could turn deadly for the Akamatsu Industries team.
21	"-DESTROY-" (Japanese: 亡-HOROBI-)	Ikuro Sato	Yuichiro Takeda	Yasuchika Nagaoka	August 26, 1999	March 15, 2003
The Akamatsu Industries team learns the real reason Dr. Mamon and his Superhuman Federation require Kaede's services.
22	"RAW -OVERGROWN HEDGE-" (Japanese: 生-MOGAKI-)	Hirokazu Yamada	Yuichiro Takeda	Umanosuke Iida	September 2, 1999	March 19, 2003
The Akamatsu Industries team saves Kaede from the Superhuman Federation, but the battle is far from over.
23	"OFFERING -MITSUGI-" (Japanese: 贄-MITSUGI-)	Atsushi Takada	Hiroaki Kitajima	Shinichirō Watanabe	September 9, 1999	March 15, 2003
The Akamatsu Industries team celebrates Christmas, but the festivities are cut short by an attack from an unexpected foe.
24	"DEATH -FAREWELL-" (Japanese: 死-WAKARE-)	Sumio Watanabe	Hiroaki Kitajima	Shinji Higuchi	September 16, 1999	March 15, 2003
Hinoki becomes a pawn in a plot to lure Betterman out into the open.
25	"BRAIN -MEMORY-" (Japanese: 脳-KIOKU-)	Akira Yoshimura	Hiroshi Yamaguchi	Yoshitomo Yonetani	September 23, 1999	March 22, 2003
All the secrets of the past few months are slowly revealed as Betterman begins what will eventually become the final battle.
26	(Japanese: -MU-)	Yoshitomo Yonetani	Hiroshi Yamaguchi	Yoshitomo Yonetani	September 30, 1999	March 22, 2003
The final battle against both Kankel and Algernon has started, which only means the number of casualties will continue to rise.

== Releases ==
Betterman aired on TV Tokyo from April 1, 1999, to September 30, 1999. It was licensed and released in the United States on DVD by Bandai Entertainment. The series was dubbed by Ocean Productions at their Blue Water studio in Calgary, Alberta. The English version aired on the cable network TechTV as part of the Anime Unleashed programming block, premiering on February 11, 2003. Following the 2012 closure of Bandai Entertainment, Sunrise announced at Otakon 2013, that Sentai Filmworks has rescued Betterman, along with a handful of other former BEI titles.

Preceded by The King of Braves GaoGaiGar	Brave series 1999	Succeeded by The King of Braves GaoGaiGar Final
