= Lamia Amri =

Tunisian actress (born 1972)

- لمياء العمري
- Born: 6 January 1972 (age 54); Tunis, Tunisia
- Citizenship: Tunisian
- Occupation: Actress
- Years active: 1998–present
- Children: 3

Lamia Amri (Arabic: لمياء العمري); is a Tunisian actress. She has appeared in many Tunisian television shows and films. In 2026, she returned to the screen after several years to play the role of "Khadija" in the Tunisian series El Khottifa, which is seen as a powerful "return to the screen".

== Early life and education ==
Lamia Amri was born in 1972 in Tunisia. She is widely known as a theatre and film actress, and she has also appeared on television in several TV series. In 1991, she graduated with a degree in computer science (data entry operator). In 1996, she completed artistic training at the Tunisian National Theatre, and in 2010, she undertook additional educational training, as well as internships in social centers.

Her professional career is marked by diverse and varied experiences.

== Career ==
After a ten-year hiatus, Amri returned to acting in 2026, marking her comeback to the screen.

== Personal life ==
Amri was married, she has 3 sons. She announced her divorce in 2020 through social media.

Amri currently resides in Lyon, France, where she lives with her family and works.

=== Health ===
In 2019, Tunisian actress Lamia Amri underwent surgery in France following a heart attack “infarction”. The news was shared through a post on her official Facebook page, where she reassured her fans that the operation had been successful and that she had passed the critical stage of recovery.

In her message, Amri expressed gratitude for the outpouring of support and affection she received from the public, stating that the encouragement deeply moved her. She also shared her pride and emotional reaction upon learning that the medical team who performed her surgery was entirely Tunisian.

She later confirmed that her condition was improving and thanked her supporters for their prayers and messages during her recovery period.

== Filmography ==
=== Cinema ===
- Saba Flouss (Short film), directed by Anis Lassoued (2006)
- Conflit, directed by Moncef Barbouche (2015)

=== Television ===
==== Series ====
- Anbar Ellil, as Zeineb (1999)
- Mnamet Aroussia, as Cherifa (2000)
- Dhafayer, directed by Habib Mselmani (2001)
- Ikhwa wa Zaman, directed by Hamadi Arafa (2003)
- Hssabet w Aqabat (2004)
- Choufli Hal, as Fedra (Guest star, Season 3, Episode 25) (2006)
- Njoum Ellil (Season 4) (2013)
- Naouret El Hawa, directed by Madih Belaid (Season 2) (2015)
- Madrasat Al Rasoul, directed by Anouar Ayachi (2016)
- El Khottifa (The Swallow Bird, Arabic: الخطّيفة), as Khadija, directed by Saoussen Jemni (2026)

==== TV Movies ====
- Khota Fawka Assahab, directed by Abdellatif Ben Ammar (2003)
- Abderrahman Ibn Khaldoun, directed by Habib Mselmani (2006)
- Puissant, directed by Habib Mselmani (2007)

=== Theatre ===
- Haddith, directed by Mohamed Driss (1998)
- Dhalamouni Habaybi, directed by Abdelaziz Meherzi (2015)
