= Katsuyoshi Yatabe =

Japanese screenwriter, anime director and sound designer

Katsuyoshi Yatabe (谷田部 勝義)
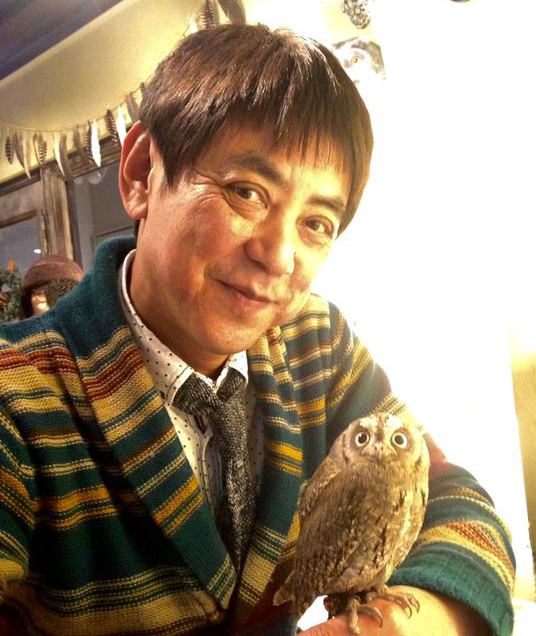
- Born: July 11, 1956 (age 70); Tokyo, Japan
- Education: College of Arts, Nihon University
- Occupations: Screenwriter; director
- Known for: Brave Series (Sunrise), Boku no Pico

Katsuyoshi Yatabe (谷田部 勝義) (born July 11, 1956 in Tokyo) is a Japanese screenwriter, anime director and sound director. He is best known for directing the first three entries in Sunrise's Brave series and the first shotacon anime adaptation (Boku no Pico).

== Filmography ==
Series he has worked on:

=== OVA ===
Year	Film	Role	Notes
1985	Armored Trooper Votoms: The Last Red Shoulder	Storyboard	
1987-1988	Dirty Pair	Director, Storyboard	Storyboard (Ep. 6, 9), Director (Ep. 6)
2002	Keraku-no-oh	Director	
2002-2003	Mobile Suit Gundam SEED Astray	Director, Storyboard	OVA Promo
2004	Kakyuusei 2: Anthology	Director, Storyboard	
2007	Boku no Pico	Director	

=== TV ===
Year	Series	Role	Notes
1980-1981	Space Runaway Ideon	Episode director	
1986-1987	Mobile Suit Gundam ZZ	Storyboard	
1988	F	Episode director	
1988-1992	Oishinbo	Storyboard	
1990	Brave Exkaiser	Director, storyboard	Episodes 26, 41
1991	The Brave Fighter of Sun Fighbird	Director	
1992	The Brave Fighter of Legend Da-Garn	Director	
1993-1994	Muka Muka Paradise	Director	
1994	Yamato Takeru	Director	
1997-1998	Anime Ganbare Goemon	Director	
1998	Futari Kurashi	Director	
1999	Gundress	Director	Movie
1999	Shin Hakkenden	Series director	
2001	Baki the Grappler: Maximum Tournament	Series director	
2001-2003	Hikaru no Go	Episode director, art	Episode Director (21, 29, 37, 53, 63, 73); Art (73)
2002-2003	Mobile Suit Gundam Seed	Unit Director	
2003-2004	Tantei Gakuen Q	Storyboard, episode director	
2004	Burn Up Scramble	Storyboard, director	Storyboard, episode 3 Director, 3, 7, 11
2004-2005	Gakuen Alice	Storyboard, episode director	
2004-2005	Mobile Suit Gundam Seed Destiny	Storyboard, episode director	
2005	Dinosaur King	Director	
2006	Hanbun no Tsuki ga Noboru Sora	Episode director	
2006	Hula Kappa	Director, screenplay, storyboard, episode director	
2006	Strawberry Panic!	Episode director	Ep. 15
2009	Kon'nichiwa Anne: Before Green Gables	Director, storyboard	Eps. 1, 39
