= Boku no Pico =

Series of Japanese anime OVAs

- Cover of the Boku no Pico DVD

ぼくのぴこ (Boku no Piko)
- Genre: Shotacon; Hentai
- Original video animation
- Directed by: Katsuyoshi Yatabe
- Produced by: Seiji Kaneko
- Written by: Katsuhiko Takayama
- Music by: Ashimagi Ora
- Studio: Natural High (production); Sugar Boy (animation); Blue Cat (animation)
- Released: September 7, 2006
- Runtime: 33 minutes
- Episodes: 3
- Original video animation

Pico & Chico
- Directed by: Katsuyoshi Yatabe
- Produced by: Seiji Kaneko
- Written by: Katsuhiko Takayama
- Music by: Shinobu
- Studio: Natural High (production); Sugar Boy (animation); Blue Cat (animation)
- Released: April 19, 2007
- Runtime: 38 minutes
- Original video animation

Pico: My Little Summer Story
- Directed by: Katsuyoshi Yatabe
- Produced by: Seiji Kaneko
- Written by: Katsuhiko Takayama
- Music by: Ashiragi Ora
- Studio: Natural High (production); Sugar Boy (animation); Blue Cat (animation)
- Released: November 11, 2007
- Runtime: 30 minutes
- Original video animation

Pico & CoCo & Chico
- Directed by: Katsuyoshi Yatabe
- Produced by: Seiji Kaneko
- Written by: Katsuhiko Takayama
- Music by: T2
- Studio: Natural High (production); Sugar Boy (animation); Blue Cat (animation)
- Released: October 9, 2008
- Runtime: 35 minutes

Boku no Pico (Japanese: ぼくのぴこ, Hepburn: Boku no Piko; lit. 'My Pico') is a Japanese original video animation (OVA) hentai series produced by Natural High. Described as "the world's first shotacon anime" by its producer, it was primarily marketed to a male audience. The series consists of three episodes and a version of the first episode edited for content, and later spawned a one-shot manga, a computer game, and a music video album.

== Story ==
Boku no Pico follows a young man named Tamotsu, or "Mokkun", who befriends Pico, a lonely, effeminate boy, leading to the two of them engaging in a sexual relationship.

=== Plot ===
As the story begins, Tamotsu, a young man who usually skips work, later heads to the seaside park. While browsing the ocean with a pair of coin-operated binoculars, which are often found in tourist spots, he spots a naked girl swimming. He gasps and stares at her, but the binoculars time out. He hurriedly puts a coin in it, but the girl had already disappeared from the ocean.

Tamotsu heads to a familiar coffee shop, Bebe. To his surprise, the girl he saw at the seaside park appears at the back of the shop. The owner tells Tamotsu that she is his granddaughter, Pico, who came from the countryside for a summer vacation and is helping out at the coffee shop throughout the time. Although she is a shy girl, she asks if he would like to play with her. Thus, Tamotsu goes to the park with Pico. He is drawn to her cuteness, but he soon realizes that Pico is actually a boy. However, Tamotsu does not seem to mind, triggering a dangerous sexual relationship between the two of them.

== List of Boku no Pico characters ==
From left to right: CoCo, Pico and Chico

=== Main characters ===
Pico
Pico (ぴこ, Piko)
Voiced by: Hikaru Ikeda
A blonde-haired boy who works a summer part-time job at his grandfather's bar. He is often portrayed swimming, usually naked or in a blue Speedo. He has worn girls' clothes ever since Tamotsu (Mokkun) gave some to him as a gift. Later, feeling hurt that Tamotsu would not define their relationship, he rebels by cutting his hair and running away from home, although later on they reconcile. The following summer, Pico meets Chico, who is swimming naked in a stream, while riding his bike. He soon becomes friends with Chico, who calls him "Oniichan" (big brother), and they form a romantic and sexual relationship. In his relationships with both Mokkun and Chico, he is the uke, though in the latter relationship this is somewhat reversible.
Tamotsu
Tamotsu (タモツ), also known as Mokkun, is a white-collar worker and regular at Bebe. He seduces Pico after mistaking him for a young girl, but continues the relationship after discovering Pico is in fact male. He later buys Pico a girl's outfit and locker room, complete with a ruby choker and panties, which he persuades Pico to wear despite his initial protests. He views Pico solely as a sexual object, though later shows true concern for Pico after he disappears. Although he eventually reconciles with Pico, he is absent in the second and third OVAs. In his relationship with Pico, he is the seme.
Chico
Chico (ちこ, Chiko)
Voiced by: Mai Akizuki
A brunette boy who lives with his older sister in a large house in a secluded forest area and develops a sexual relationship with Pico in the second episode. He is younger and less sexually experienced than Pico. He often plays in the outdoors nude and secretly watches Oneesan masturbate. In most cases, Chico is the seme, despite his age, though his relationship with Pico is somewhat reversible.
CoCo
Coco (ここ, Koko) is a feminine-looking boy with long, black hair whom Pico and Chico meet in the third episode. It is subtly implied that Coco is actually a so-called "city fairy", due to some strange minor occurrences in his vicinity, though this is never explicitly confirmed. Coco soon has sexual relationships with both Pico and Chico. After inadvertently causing some friction in their relationship, Coco decides to distance himself from Pico and Chico, though they do reunite with him at Tokyo Tower and end up having a threesome. He is also the main uke of the three, but this can be reversed.

=== Other characters ===
Ojiisan
Ojiisan (おじいさん) is Pico's grandfather who runs a large but usually empty bar by the beach named Bebe. When Tamotsu visits him for the summer, he has Pico help out as waiter, which involves wearing a frilly pink apron. He introduces Pico to Tamotsu and suggests they spend time together.
Oneesan
Oneesan (お姉さん) is Chico's older sister and legal guardian. Perhaps because of her caring for Chico, and her isolated home in the countryside, she appears sexually frustrated and masturbates regularly. After being caught masturbating by the boys through a crack in her bedroom ceiling, she becomes the indirect cause of their experimentation. She has a large collection of cosplay outfits and sex toys that Pico and Chico use without her permission. She later fondles herself away from the boys when she finds them sexually engaged upon returning home from the grocery store.

== Episode list ==
No.	English title Japanese title	Directed by	Written by	Original release date
1	"My Pico"; Transliteration: "Boku no Piko" (ぼくのぴこ)	Katsuyoshi Yatabe	Katsuhiko Takayama	September 7, 2006; December 13, 2019 (remastered)
An effeminate boy named Pico works summers at his grandfather's café, hoping to make some friends. He soon meets a man named Tamotsu "Mokkun", who seduces him, believing him to be a girl. Later at Mokkun's house, Pico asks Mokkun what he thinks of him, but he does not respond. Pico runs away and cuts his hair. Mokkun searches for him, and the two reconcile at the end of the episode.
2	"Pico & Chico"; Transliteration: "Piko to Chiko" (ぴことちこ)	Katsuyoshi Yatabe	Katsuhiko Takayama	April 19, 2007; December 13, 2019 (remastered)
After Pico finds a boy named Chico swimming nude in a stream, they become friends, after catching Chico's sister masturbating, Pico shows Chico how boys can do it, and the two have sex.
TBA	"Pico: My Little Summer Story"; Transliteration: "Piko ~boku no chīsana natsu monogatari~" (pico ~ぼくの小さな夏物語~)	Katsuyoshi Yatabe	Katsuhiko Takayama	November 11, 2007
An edited re-release of the first OVA with a different cut aimed at a broader audience.
3	"Pico & CoCo & Chico"; Transliteration: "Piko×CoCo×Chiko" (ぴこ×CoCo×ちこ)	Katsuyoshi Yatabe	Katsuhiko Takayama	October 9, 2008; December 13, 2019 (remastered)
Pico and Chico meet a runaway named Coco who lives in a hideout underneath the Tokyo subway. Pico, falling in love with Coco, begins to question his feelings for Chico, especially after he catches Coco and Chico having sex together. After a brief separation, they reconcile with a threesome atop Tokyo Tower.

== Media ==
=== Anime ===
The anime, which was described as "the world's first shotacon anime" by its producer, was marketed towards a male audience. One of the main illustrators and staff members of Boku no Pico was Saigado, an active doujinshi artist after the early debut commercial. In 2004, he published his own doujinshi titled Shota-nize: Project to Turn Female Characters into Boys. This led to him working on the characters for the OVA "Series Pico". Other Boku no Pico staff members included director Katsuyoshi Yatabe and screenwriter Katsuhiko Takayama. Shinobu was the primary musician, Seiji Kaneko was the producer and sound director, and Yoshiten served as the character designer and animation director. Other staff members included music director and sound designer Dr.T, production producer Takeshi Aoki, and video editor Ryō Nakajima.

Three original video animations have been released. All three were directed by Katsuyoshi Yatabe and produced by Natural High. The first, My Pico, was released to DVD by Soft on Demand on September 7, 2006, and had three episodes. The second, Pico & Chico, followed on April 16, 2007. The third episode, Pico & CoCo & Chico, was released on October 9, 2008.

A box set containing the first two episodes and the soundtrack CD was released by Soft on Demand on April 19, 2007. On November 11, 2007, the first OVA was re-edited with a different script and re-released under the title Pico: My Little Summer Story. The edited version is the only one of the series to be considered appropriate for viewers under 18.

=== Manga and visual novel ===
A oneshot manga, Ame no Hi no Pico to Chico (雨の日のぴことちこ, lit. A Day of Rain for Pico and Chico), was written by Aoi Madoka and published in the May 2007 issue of Hanaota.

On April 6, 2008, producer GOLDENBOY (金子政路, Kaneko Seiji) confirmed on their blog that a PC game, Pico to Chico — Shota Idol no Oshigoto (ぴことちこ ショタアイドルのオシゴト, Pikotochiko shotaaidoru no oshigoto), starring Pico and Chico, was being produced. The game, an eroge featuring many erotic depictions of the two characters, was released by Tinkorbell (てぃんこーべる, Tinkōberu) on October 15, 2010. The game was available for download for Windows 2000, Windows XP, Windows Vista, and Windows 7, alongside a physical DVD version. While the official Tinkorbell website is now only accessible through archives, the game can still be purchased via several other active Japanese websites.

=== Music video album ===
A music video album, Boku no Pico PV Song Collection: Boku, Otoko no Ko dayo (ぼくのぴこ PV Song Collection: 〜ぼく、男の子だよ〜; lit. 'My Pico PV Song Collection: I'm a Boy'), was released in Japan on July 9, 2009, as a DVD set. It has a 30-minute runtime and includes more than 8 music videos starring the characters from the OVAs. It also includes a karaoke option for each video.

== Reception ==
Boku no Pico was a success, with the first work in the series selling over 10,000 copies, placing it at the top of Amazon's adult category in the second week of September 2006. Boku no Pico's OVA producer, Seiji Kaneko, was given the Soft on Demand Special Award in the 2006 5th Annual SOD AV Awards following its release. Unauthorized English subtitled versions of Boku no Pico's first OVA episode appeared on the web shortly after its release, which were downloaded over 100,000 times. The foreign interest in Boku no Pico led to plans to officially release it overseas, but those plans never materialized.

The OVA of Boku no Pico is considered controversial by Western sources because it contains elements of child pornography, homosexuality, sexual exploitation, and shotacon. A CBR article described the age gap between Pico and Tamotsu as "nothing short of disturbing".
