= Shigezō Sasaoka =

Japanese voice actor

- Born: Sadao Sasaoka; May 5, 1948; Fukushima Prefecture, Japan
- Died: August 31, 1998 (aged 50); Japan
- Occupation: Voice actor
- Years active: 1974–1998
- Height: 175 cm (5 ft 9 in)

Sadao Sasaoka (笹岡 定雄, Sasaoka Sadao; May 5, 1948 – August 31, 1998), better known by the stage name Shigezō Sasaoka (笹岡 繁蔵, Sasaoka Shigezō), was a Japanese voice actor born in Fukushima Prefecture, Japan. He died in 1998 from typhoid. After his death, his ongoing roles were replaced with other voice actors.

== Filmography ==
=== Television animation ===
- Akū Daisakusen Srungle (Crime Boss)
- Attacker YOU! (Director Matsugorō Daimon)
- Blue Comet SPT Layzner (Gasten)
- The Brave Fighter of Legend Da-Garn (Cyan)
- The Brave Fighter of Sun Fighbird (Detective Satsuta)
- The Brave of Gold Goldran (Treasure Walzac)
- Brave Police J-Decker (Dr. Eric Von Gigastein III)
- Chōdendō Robo Tetsujin 28-go FX (President Zorn)
- Detective Conan (Hideo Kawashima, Toshiro Ebara)
- Flame of Recca (Sekiou)
- Hariken Polymer (Flying Squirrels member)
- Lupin III Part 2 (Goemon Ishikawa I)
- Machine Robo: Revenge of Cronos (Gadess)
- Mahōjin Guru Guru (Demon Giri)
- Mashin Hero Wataru (schwalbinegger, Zan Gyakku)
- Miru to Kowaku Naru Tsūkai! Yokozuna Anime Aa Harimanada (Mitsugu Tachikaze)
- Mobile Fighter G Gundam (Dahāru Muhamando, Mākirotto Chronos)
- Nintama Rantarō (Fūki, Panzō Kurokoge)
- Obocchama-kun (Subaruta-sensei)
- Ronin Warriors (Arago)
- Round Vernian Vifam (Professor Melvin Krake)
- Space Runaway Ideon (Professor Formosa)
- Uchū Majin Daikengō (Gōriki)
- Zenki (Gōra)
- Zettai Muteki Raijin-Oh (Emperor Warusar)

=== Original video animation (OVA) ===
- Armored Trooper Votoms: Shining Heresy (Noscowitz)
- Dragon Slayer: The Legend of Heroes (Akudamu)
- Giant Robo: The Animation (Li Zhong, Professor Duncan)
- La Blue Girl (Bosatsu and Ranmaru's Grandfather)
- Violence Jack (Slum King)
- Ys II: Ancient Ys Vanished - The Final Chapter (Dalles)

=== Video games ===
- Langrisser: The Descendants of Light (Chaos)
- Panzer Bandit (Farado)

=== Tokusatsu ===
- B-Fighter Kabuto (Dark Beast Tokasuzura)

=== Dubbing ===
==== Live-action ====
- Hard Target (1997 Fuji TV edition) (Mr. Lopacki (Robert Apisa))
- Indiana Jones and the Last Crusade (Sallah (John Rhys-Davies))
- Space Rangers (Zylyn (Cary-Hiroyuki Tagawa))
- Spenser: For Hire (Hawk (Avery Brooks))

==== Animation ====
- TaleSpin (Don Karnage (Jim Cummings)
- Teenage Mutant Ninja Turtles (Bebop)

== Successors ==
- Ryuzaburo Otomo: (Super Robot Wars: Geddes, Ganan, Emperor Warusa; Nintama Rantaro: Kazeoni black moss)
- Hiroshi Naka: (Anpanman: Spade Musketeers)
- Banjou Ginga: (Sunrise Eiyuutan: Emperor)
- Daisuke Gouri: (Sunrise Eiyuutan: Ganan)
- Kazuhisa Tanaka: (Sabata: officer)
- Jin Urayama: (Nintama Rantaro: Jokoji Azukae Gate Officer)
- Kenji Nomura: (Nintama Rantaro: Jokoji Azukae Gate Officer)
