= Brave series =

Japanese media franchise

Brave Series
- Brave Series 30th Anniversary Poster
- Created by: Hajime Yatate
- Owner: Sunrise (Bandai Namco Filmworks)

Print publications
- Novel(s): Fighbird: Yutaro Katori's Subsequent Days on Earth (1992); Lion Reine (1998); The King of Braves GaoGaiGar preFINAL (2016); The King of Braves GaoGaiGar FINALplus (2016); King of Kings: GaoGaiGar vs Betterman (2016); The Saint of Braves Baan Gaan: The Novel (2024)
- Comics: The King of Braves GaoGaiGar FINAL the COMIC (1997); King of Kings: GaoGaiGar vs Betterman the COMIC (2018); Brave Universe Sworgrader (2023)

Films and television
- Animated series: Brave Exkaiser (1990); The Brave of Sun Fighbird (1991); The Brave Fighter of Legend Da-Garn (1992); The Brave Express Might Gaine (1993); The Brave Police J-Decker (1994); The Brave of Gold Goldran (1995); The Brave Command Dagwon (1996); The King of Braves GaoGaiGar (1997); Betterman (1999); The King of Braves GaoGaiGar Final: Grand Glorious Gathering (2005)
- Direct-to-video: The Brave Command Dagwon: The Boy With Crystal Eyes (1997); The King of Braves GaoGaiGar Final (2000)

Miscellaneous
- Toy(s): Soul of Chogokin; Super Robot Chogokin; High Grade; Real Grade; Super Mini Pla; The Gattai PLAMATEA

The Brave series (Japanese: 勇者シリーズ, Hepburn: Yūsha Shirīzu) is a Japanese toy and mecha anime franchise originally created and produced by Sunrise and funded by Takara. The franchise was a spiritual successor to Takara's Transformers series in Japan and ran from the 1990s to 2000s, producing eight official series and several side media including Original Video Animations (OVAs), toys (which sometimes re-used pre-existing molds from Transformers characters), and several memorabilia in Japan. It was one of Sunrise's most notable productions in the 90s, and its run played a key role in the reintroduction of the Super Robot genre to the Japanese mainstream.

As of 2022, the rights to the series were now owned by Bandai Namco Filmworks, following the 1994 acquisition of Sunrise, who produced and animated the series.

== History ==
=== Background ===
At the beginning of the series, the slogan for the franchise was "animation that does not appear in anime magazines", and the intended audience were aged 3 to 5 years old. The original concept is to "Make a hero robot for small children.", with the project produced as a joint effort between Sunrise's Studio 7 Division and Takara. Takara's decision on choosing Sunrise for the project is their expertise on several robot anime shows in both the 70's and the 80's, which included Mobile Suit Gundam and both companies once worked on shows such as Fang of the Sun Dougram, Panzer World Galient and Armored Trooper Votoms, in which Takara is a sponsor. Shinji Takamatsu recalled after he joined Sunrise during the success of Gundam that "if you release a robot in an anime, the toys will follow later," and that "I'll do more with toys". Takayuki Yoshi, who in that time, was a producer at Sunrise, cited that he was worried about this situation and was one of those who wanted to create robot works and characters that could compete with Toei and Bandai's Super Sentai series. It was a good for them that the target age group (for robot anime) was getting older, but at the same time, Katsuyoshi Yatabe, who directed the first three works, testified that he had in mind the idea that if there were works for younger children, it would spread from there.

However, when Takara entered the American market, their partner Hasbro had lumped all the various transforming and combining products they had been working on under the name Transformers, which resulted in complicated rights issues for the series. Inoue Koichi said that during the time Transformers Victory is ending its run, an executive at Takara approached him asking if Sunrise could make a work like Transformers, and Yoshi, readily accepted, thinking that it would be interesting if the series could continue for 10 or 20 years as an introductory series to robot works. However, with the success of the aforementioned real robot series having established the brand, there was strong reluctance within Sunrise to work on a work aimed at children at this point, and Yoshi apparently spent a great deal of time explaining to the executives the need for the aforementioned "introductory series to robot works for children."

When this series was launched, while they were developing toys that made use of the know-how they had gained from Transformers, Takara apparently made requests to Sunrise saying, "There are robots that transform from vehicles, so we would like you to create a story based on that," and "It should be taken from a completely different angle to Transformers.", and as this was Sunrise's first project for children in a long time, the animation production side, led by Inoue, solidified the basic pattern of the series, which involves robots that transform from vehicles and that can combine with each other.

The first work in the series, "Brave Exkaiser", was originally planned and produced with the theme of "eliminating complicated themes and settings" in order to be a "pure children's program".

However, as the series progressed, the target age and the range of settings and styles of each work gradually expanded, up to the final installment of the series, "The King of Braves GaoGaiGar". It has also gained support from non-fans up to that point. In response to its popularity, the franchise was also developed in various media such as OVAs, games, and drama CDs in addition to the TV series.

Both companies' partnership is solid during the production of the series, however in 1994, during the first airing of The Brave Police J-Decker, Sunrise was acquired by Bandai through capital acquisition. As a result, Takara also distanced itself from Sunrise, and next year's project was temporarily cancelled. The influence is felt in the series as Takamatsu, who was the director of "J-Decker" at the time, later recalled that since the series was also aiming to return to the series' roots, he had approached the project with the intention that "this would be the end of the Brave Series." Eventually, as J-Decker was nearing the end, Takara again brought the next year's project (Goldran) to Sunrise, and the series continued after that year. However, as time passed and the planning for The King of Braves GaoGaiGar was launched, there was already an atmosphere within Sunrise that it might be difficult to continue the Brave series in collaboration with Takara. As a result, GaoGaiGar was produced with the intention of it being the last in the series, and unlike previous works, Sunrise was proactive in proposing ideas for things like robot designs and took a leading role in production.

As the franchise ended, news of it was announced in the newspaper as the top article of the evening edition of the Asahi Shimbun Nagoya edition on December 22, 1997, and two weeks later, the national edition on January 5, 1998, saying that any mecha animation will be halted due to the declining birthrate and the popularity of video games in Japan. Also, on page 13 of the morning edition of the Tokyo Shimbun on February 4, 1998, the end of this series was reported under the heading "The disappeared giant robot", and in the same article, the audience rating and toy sales were sluggish as to the reason for the end of the series. Tomomitsu Mochizuki stated about the decline in an interview that "When the series was first launched, the toys sold really well, but sales gradually dropped due to a decline in the number of children and the popularity of video games," and "Towards the end of the series, around the time Brave Command Dagwon is airing, the series struggled in terms of ratings, and TV stations often approached us for help."

During the Takara-Tomy merger in 2006, the Brave series wasn't part of the franchises that will carry over to the new company, with the intellectual rights to it were sold to Bandai Namco Entertainment.

=== Themes ===
The overlying theme of each series is "Bravery", the interaction between the robot "Brave", who has a heart and the boy, the will of the mecha, the union of the robots, and other unique themes for each series. With the exception of the relationship between "Brave Exkaiser" and "The Brave Fighter of Sun Fighbird", there is no direct relationship between each series in terms of world view or time. Therefore, almost all the works are different to each other in terms of themes and motif, and that changes every series.

The robots that appear in the series are called "Brave Robo". Vehicles familiar to children, such as police cars, ambulances, fire engines, airplanes, and bullet trains, are transformed into the brave robos. This is because it was judged that it would be easier for children to sympathize with a familiar vehicle as a motif. Brave Robo can talk at will, and were classified into three types: "advanced life form type" where their life is transferred to a machine such as a vehicle and turned into a robot while "super AI type" where brave robots is made by human hands and granted advanced human-like intelligence and "fusion type" in which the main character fuses with a brave robot at will.

=== Design ===
Great Exkaiser (anime)

Great Exkaiser (DX toy)

All of the main hero robots' mechanical designs in the Brave series were those of prolific Sunrise mechanical designer Kunio Okawara. In most of the Brave series, there is a main hero robot (usually the most or second-most expensive toy in the line), backed up by one or two support combiner teams and later receiving one or two combiner partners, upgrading the hero to more powerful forms. (The most or second-most powerful form of the hero robot is usually known as its "Great," "Dai," or "Super" form.) A number of supporting characters and enemies across the Brave Series had designs or remolds derived from earlier and present (for the day) Generation One Takara Transformers designs, most notably those of Transformers Victory, Transformers: Zone and Transformers Battlestars: Return of Convoy (the latter never having its own animated series). The enemy "Geister" characters in Brave Exkaiser (save for their leader, Dino Geist) were actually designed off of the first-generation Dinobot toys, for instance. Ultra Raker was also one of those designs whose origin was intended for Transformers and bore little resemblance to their final designs.

There are also similar design elements between the Brave toys and Generation 2/Beast Wars Transformers, which were released around the same time. Many of the Da-Garn toys have light-piped eyes thanks to transparent pieces of plastic in their heads, a design element which many Generation 2 Transformers share. The Goldran DX toyline contains many projectile launchers, something Generation 2 shared as well. In particular, Advenger contains a rotor-launching gimmick identical to that of the Rotor Force from Generation 2. Lastly, the elbows of Leon from the DX Leon Kaiser toy contain ball joints, a design element that gained much broader use during Generation 2 and even more so during the Beast Wars toy line.

Toys for these robots were created in two sizes: DX ("deluxe") versions that contained more gimmicks and more complicated transformations, and STD ("standard") versions that contained fewer gimmicks and more limited transformations, but often also higher accuracy in reproducing the look of the robot from the anime series. Generally, the transformation of the robots was created by Takara, while the look of the robots was created by Okawara.

== Brave series overview ==
There are eight original entries in the Brave Series: one new series released every year, from 1990 to 1997, each with an episode count exceeding 40 in length. Each series is set in separate, unrelated timelines from each other. No further series appear to be planned for development in the near future.

They are the following, sorted by year of first airing:

1990. Brave Exkaiser (Japanese: 勇者エクスカイザー, Hepburn: Yūsha Ekusukaizā) had 48 episodes
1991. The Brave Fighter of Sun Fighbird (Japanese: 太陽の勇者ファイバード, Hepburn: Taiyō no Yūsha Faibādo) had 48 episodes
1992. The Brave Fighter of Legend Da-Garn (Japanese: 伝説の勇者ダ・ガーン, Hepburn: Densetsu no Yūsha Da Gān) had 46 episodes
1993. The Brave Express Might Gaine (Japanese: 勇者特急マイトガイン, Hepburn: Yūsha Toukyū Maitogain) had 47 episodes
1994. The Brave Police J-Decker (Japanese: 勇者警察ジェイデッカー, Hepburn: Yūsha Keisatsu Jeidekkā) had 48 episodes
1995. The Brave of Gold Goldran (Japanese: 黄金勇者ゴルドラン, Hepburn: Ōgon Yūsha Gorudoran) had 48 episodes
1996. Brave Command Dagwon (Japanese: 勇者指令ダグオン, Hepburn: Yūsha Shirei Daguon) had 48 episodes plus 2 OVAs
1997. The King of Braves GaoGaiGar (Japanese: 勇者王ガオガイガー, Hepburn: Yūsha Ō GaoGaiGā) had 49 episodes
1999. Betterman (Japanese: ベターマン, Hepburn: Betāman) was a spin-off of GaoGaiGar with 26 episodes
2000. The King of Braves GaoGaiGar Final (Japanese: 勇者王ガオガイガー FINAL, Hepburn: Yūshaō Gaogaigā Fainaru) (OVA series) had 8 episodes
2005. The King of Braves GaoGaiGar Final Grand Glorious Gathering had 12 episodes
2016. King of Kings: GaoGaiGar VS Betterman (Japanese: 覇界王～ガオガイガー対ベターマン～, Hepburn: Hakaiō ~Gaogaigā tai Betāman ~) (Novel series) had 33 chapters
2023. Brave Universe Sworgrader (Japanese: 勇者宇宙(ブレイブユニバース)ソーグレーダー, Hepburn: Bureibu Yunibāsu Sōgurēdā) (Web Manga series)
2024. The Saint of Braves Baan Gaan: The Novel (勇者聖戦バーンガーン: THE NOVEL, Yūsha Seisen Bān Gān: Za Noveru) (Novel series)

To date, only GaoGaiGar and Betterman have been licensed for distribution in the United States; their licenses originally held by Media Blasters and Bandai Entertainment, respectively; each company releasing DVD's of the series in the 2000s. GaoGaiGar and its OVA sequel were recently licensed for distribution in Asia via Muse Communication and Discotek Media in the United States while Betterman's license now belongs to Sentai Filmworks.

=== Unproduced installment ===
Before GaoGaiGar ended, another show, Photogrizer (フォトグライザー, Fotoguraizā), was planned to continue the franchise but was canceled and shelved. Fully titled Brave of Light Photogrizer, the show would involve designs based on, at the time, the new technology of digital cameras and then-modern cell phones.

=== Additional Brave works ===
==== Brave Saga and Brave Saga 2 ====
The first Brave Saga for the PlayStation included an original "ninth" series exclusive to the game, The Saint of Braves Baan Gaan (勇者聖戦バーンガーン, Yūsha Seisen Bān Gān). Despite not being part of the core 8, Sunrise produced animated transformation and merging sequences to go with the game alongside a fully animated intro. Just like in Exkaiser, the Braves are digital alien spirits possessing bodies made by VARS (Valiant Attack and Rescue Squad). Fighting toys used in tournaments, to be exact. The main character of the series is the shy Shunpei Serizawa. Baan possessed his toy to help his master, Astral fight the evil forces of Grandark. Shunpei's friend Hiro and Baan's teammate Spherion were corrupted by Grandark into the evil Guilty and Guildion. Baan combines with the Gaan Dasher truck to form Baan Gaan, while Spherion/Guildion combines with the Mach/Dark Fighter to become Mach Spherion/Dark Guildion, When Mach Spherion is purified, he and Baan Gaan combine into Great Baan Gaan. Additionally, VARS made Baan Gaan 3 support drones he can combine with to fight on different terrain: a narwhal turns him into Drill Baan Gaan, an eagle turns him into Wing Baan Gaan, and a saber-toothed tiger turns him into Power Baan Gaan.

Brave Saga 2, also released for the PlayStation, can be considered a final re-telling of the Brave Series as it features virtually all Brave Series characters, mecha and human alike, from the previous generation. Although parallel universes are used to explain why series such as Brave Express Might Gaine can be involved in the plot, the story assumed that at least some of the series, noticeably GaoGaiGar and Baan Gaan, happen at around the same time and in the same world. Generally, GaoGaiGar storyline is considered to be the 'side-story' while Baan Gaan served as the main event, with other Yūsha participate in either of the story. Also, a general time line is given to some of the work, such as stating that the entire events within The Brave Fighter of Legend Da-Garn inspired the creation of Grand Police Department in Brave Police J-Decker, while the events in The Brave Fighter of Sun Fighbird is part of the reason why Brave Command Dagwon is formed.

Similar to the Super Robot Wars series of games, there are some non-Brave Series series being involved in the plot, and they are considered to be Real Robot, among them is Armored Trooper Votoms which was animated by Sunrise with the toys and merchandise being provided by Takara. Shizuma of the Sword clan the vessel of an ultimate weapon against transdimensional demons called Asmodians. But in a surprise attack, he lost his physical body and his soul was split into the weapon's six elements: fire, water, earth, air, light, and darkness. His mother, the priestess, gave up her life so Shizuma would have a provisional body to fight back. Shizuma has machines called the Varion series that allow him to fight the Asmodians. Motovarion is a motorcycle that interface with a jet, an armored fire truck, and an amphibious super limited express train that can combine into 3 different robots: Saber, Ace, and Max Varion. It is later revealed that there was a robot called Varion sealed within Motovarion that can combine with a hi-tech space shuttle to form Victorion, When Shizuma finally gets all the elements of his soul, Victorion evolves into Galaxion. Additionally, 2 of Baan's teammates called Magna and Flash arrive as trains. They can combine into Magna Bomber, and/or Flash Kaiser.

A spinoff game called Brave Saga New Astaria was released for the Game Boy Color. A robot called Gunbar can combine with a dog robot called 01 to form Gunbar 01. Zetter combines with an aircraft to form Zetter 99. Their father combines with the Big Condor, a subterrene, and a rescue vehicle to form Big Father. Additionally, Gunbar 01 and Zetter 99 can combine with the Big Condor and Plus Jetter to form Zetter Gunbar.

As the consideration of toy-safety measures, sharp edges and parts were avoided in animates Brave Series to prevent redesigning parts. As Baan Gaan was never made into animation, the mechanical design were slightly different from other leading Brave Series robots – many sharp edges can be seen in Baan Gaan, Mach Sperion, and Great Baan Gaan. The combination process of aforementioned Brave Series robots basically proceed features of every previous Brave Series' combination. The CM Company did make toys of Baan Gaan and Mach Spherion, but not of the Varion robots or train brothers.

Up until recently, the events of Baan Gaan has been adapted into an ongoing Web Novel by Ukyo Kodachi and illustrated by Shiro Tsunashima. It has been serialized in Hobby Japan's official Web Novel site on June 6, 2024. The Web Novel explores several concepts of the series that were never adapted into the Brave Saga games.

==== New Century Brave Wars ====
Brave Wars is the first and only Brave series game to be produced for the PlayStation 2. Quantum Leap Layzelber (Ryoushi Choyaku Layzelber, title can also be interpreted as Quantum Leap Rayzelver and Quantum Leap Rayserver. Layzelber is not counted among the Brave series by Sunrise). Chyota is the partner of an advanced robot called Layzer, who transforms into a Bugatti Chiron and combines with a VTOL jet called the Rayhawk to form Layzelber, who aims to stop the 6 Knights of Varios from conquering the multiverse. Layzelber can also combine with another jet to form Sky Layzelber, a drill tank to form Ground Layzelber, and a high-speed submarine to form Marine Layzelber. Or Layzer can skip the Rayhawk and combine with the other 3 support vehicles to form Dailayzer. Chyota's rival Gallio has a robot called Emperios that can combine with a private jet to form Emperios Forte, who can combine with an armored vehicle to form Emperios Fortissimo. Gallio is aided by his servants Roberto and Fiore. In a nod to Baan Gaan, Layzer is blue and Emperios is red, and the robots are rivals. Layzer's small support vehicles also function like Baan Gaan's animals. Both boys' families each have some scientific skill used to make the robots.

The first entry in the Eldran series, Zettai Muteki Raijin-Oh was also added to the game. This is mainly because of the many similarities between the Yūsha series and the Eldran series as they all featured transforming and combining robots and both series were animated by Sunrise. The only key difference was that the Eldran toys were produced by Tomy. However Tomy and Takara later merged into Takara Tomy, so that both series fall under the same corporate ownership allowing Raijin-Oh to be part of the game, along with Might Gaine, J-Decker, Dagwon, GaoGaiGar and the non-canon Layzelber. The other Brave robots and the other Eldran robots were not featured in the game. Unlike the Brave Sagas, Brave Wars was made by Winkysoft and published by Atlus rather than Takara, who only licensed the game.

== Cultural influence ==
The influence of the Brave Series can be officially seen in various anime and manga works produced after the franchise's cancellation. Character designer Hirokazu Hisayuki and director Mitsuo Fukuda used the concepts from the first Brave Saga game in the anime Gear Fighter Dendoh, with the plot and concept similarities between Dendoh and Baan Gaan are extremely numerous including the mechanics for how the machines combine with their animal-robot helpers, an emphasis on a running conflict between two particular Super Robots (one blue and one red), the dual-protagonist structure, and the idea of child pilots fighting with the support of a group of older pilots and technicians (VARS in Baan Gaan, and GEAR in Dendoh). While Dendoh was only a modest commercial success, the show was received warmly by critics, and the team has since gone on to become responsible for profitable series such as My-HiME, Mobile Suit Gundam SEED and Mobile Suit Gundam SEED Destiny.

Following Dendoh, Sunrise took a final stab at resurrecting the Brave style of television series by having some Dendoh staffers return to work on Machine Robo Rescue, based on a modern-day reworking of Bandai and PLEX's own Machine Robo toy line. Rescue combined all of the basic storytelling tropes of the original six, kid-friendly Brave series with a truly vast toy line and an early Sunrise attempt at blending 2D animation (the characters) with 3D animation (the robots). While the toys were popular and the anime did well with older audiences, the 3D animation was widely criticized, and overall the effort failed to recapture the original popularity of the Brave Series. Sunrise would not attempt another 2D/3D series until 2006, with the well-received series Zegapain.

Takara briefly returned to the Brave series' overall premise—that of producing interstitial properties with themes similar to that of Transformers—with the release of Dennou Boukenki Webdiver and Daigunder. Both properties yielded anime television series featuring transforming robots with either their own minds or the ability to "meld" with heroic children, and toys that could interact with TV screens as video games. However, both Webdiver and Daigunder seem to have faded into obscurity. 15 years later Takara again returned to the Brave-like premise once again this time collaborating with OLM, Inc. to create shows like Tomica Hyper Rescue Drive Head Kidō Kyūkyū Keisatsu, Tomica Bond Combination Earth Granner and Shinkansen Henkei Robo Shinkalion THE ANIMATION. Takara also once brought the Brave-like premise to Transformers with Transformers Go!.

Masami Obari, one of the animators for the franchise, cites the series as his inspiration to several of his recent works in the animation industry. He is also created a tribute to the franchise in the form of Gravion in 2004 by studio Gonzo and later in the 2024 anime series Brave Bang Bravern!, which is produced by Cygames Pictures.

For the series' 30th Anniversary, an official exhibit was hosted by Sunrise from December 11, 2020, to January 17, 2021. Despite Bandai Namco Filmworks having no plans for a new series, it continues to produce new projects for older fans with the announcement of the web manga series Sworgrader in 2023. Recently, several new toys and models of the franchise meant for the older crowd have recently been produced by Bandai Spirits or under license from several toy companies including Good Smile Company, Sentinel, Kotobukiya, and Takara Tomy (under its T-Spark label).

== See also ==
- Transformers
- Eldran series
