= Brave Exkaiser =

1990 television anime

- 勇者エクスカイザー
- Genre: Mecha adventure science fiction
- Creator: Hajime Yatate
- Director: Katsuyoshi Yatabe
- Series composition: Yasushi Hirano
- Character designer: Masayuki Hiraoka
- Music: Kohei Tanaka
- Country of origin: Japan
- Original language: Japanese
- No. of episodes: 48

Production
- Producers: Shin Imai (Nagoya TV); Youichi Honma (Tokyu Agency); Takayuki Yoshii (Sunrise)
- Production companies: Nagoya TV; Tokyu Agency; Sunrise

Original release
- Networks: ANN (Nagoya TV, TV Asahi)
- Release: February 3, 1990 – January 26, 1991

Brave Exkaiser (勇者エクスカイザー, Yūsha Ekusukaizā; Sometimes translated as Brave Exkaizer or Brave Fighter Exkizer) is a Japanese animated television series produced by Sunrise. The series is directed by Katsuyoshi Yatabe and written by Yasushi Hirano with both character and mecha designs done by Masayuki Hiraoka and Kunio Okawara respectively. It aired on Nagoya TV from February 3, 1990, to January 26, 1991, consisting of 48 episodes.

Exkaiser is the first installment in Takara and Sunrise's Brave series franchise, spanning up to eight separate installments. It is generally one of the more influential anime in the 1990s, which revitalized the Super Robot genre in that time through both the series' reception as well as its toy sales. It would be later referenced and homaged in several other animated works.

== Story ==
A group of space police led by Exkaiser are chasing after the Geisters, an evil gang of treasure thieves. Upon arriving on Earth, Exkaiser and his team, the Kaisers, house their spirits into vehicles all over Japan to create physical bodies for their energy-based forms. Exkaiser inhabits a car belonging to the Hoshikawa family and befriends a third grade boy named Kouta Hoshikawa. Exkaiser and his allies must unite their powers in order to fight the Geisters and prevent them from stealing Earth's artifacts.

== Development ==
Brave Exkaiser was a co-production between Sunrise and Takara, with the latter producing the toyline based on the series. Sunrise, who was assigned to animate the series, planned the show to be a solo series and will not have any spinoffs nor start a franchise. It was also aimed for kids at that time. Its premise was also based on one central theme: "Searching for One's Treasure", reflecting the value of important things that can only be understood after losing. This theme became the central point of the series's finale. While developing the mecha designs, Takara based the concept of the mechas on the Transformers toyline, as the concept of Alien Robots coming from space, though depicted them as Super Robots that combine both sophisticated and simple designs in their various forms, something that is later passed to the Transformers franchise in its later incarnations. In addition, the concept of a boy befriending a robot, a concept previously seen in Transformers Victory, was implemented in the series as seen in the bond between Exkaiser and Kouta.

Upon release of the anime, sales of the series' toys were among the highest in 1990 according to Takara; they also described it as their "best year" in sales. Though production narrowed down a bit due to the release of the Super Nintendo in Japan in that same year with the year-end sales being slow due to a large amount of inventory of toys. Keiichi Tanaka, stated that "(In Kansai), There was no inventory left because we made adjustments by transferring between wholesalers at the end of the year." Takara foresaw the potential of the series as a franchise not as a toys franchise but as "a series with a compelling storyline and drama for older audiences", which paid off in Brave future installments.

== Media ==
=== Anime ===
Brave Exkaiser originally aired on Nagoya TV from February 3, 1990, to January 26, 1991, replacing Jushin Liger on its timeslot. Hidemi Miura performed both the series's opening and ending themes: "Gather Way" and "Korekara no Anata e" (これからのあなたへ; "To you in the future"). The series' music was composed by Kohei Tanaka, who would later compose music for The King of Braves GaoGaiGar, the final entry in the Brave series.

No.	Title	Directed by	Written by	Original release date
1	"Our Family Car is an Alien!?" "Bokunchi no Sha wa eirian!?" (ボクんちの車は宇宙人(エイリアン)!?)	Mitsuo Fukuda	Yasushi Hirano	February 3, 1990
2	"Save the Liner Motorcar!" "Rinia mōtākā o tasukete!" (リニア・モーターカーを助けて!)	Toshifumi Kawase	Yasushi Hirano	February 10, 1990
3	"The Chaotic Blackout" "Daiteiden de dai Konran" (大停電で大こんらん)	Hiroshi Ishiodori	Yasushi Hirano	February 17, 1990
4	"The Mars Orbital Rocket Launches!" "Kasei iki roketto shi~ppatsu!" (火星行きロケットしゅっぱーつ!)	Raita Hiroshi	Hideki Sonoda	February 24, 1990
5	"The Pharmacy is Empty!?" "Kusuriyasan ga karappo!?" (薬屋さんがカラッポ!?)	Shinji Takamatsu	Mami Watanabe	March 3, 1990
6	"Our Sunken Ship Expedition Party" "Bokura chinbotsu-sentan kentai" (ボクら沈没船たんけん隊)	Directed by : Raita Hiroshi; Storyboarded by : Mitsuo Fukuda	Keiko Maruo	March 10, 1990
7	"Danger Turns Round at the Amusement Park!" "Yuenchi de kiken ga guruguru!" (遊園地でキケンがぐるぐる!)	Toshifumi Kawase	Keiko Maruo	March 17, 1990
8	"I'm a Jet Pilot" "Boku wa jettopairotto" (ボクはジェットパイロット)	Hiroshi Ishiodori	Hideki Sonoda	March 24, 1990
9	"A Disturbance at Hanamiyama's Buddha" "O Hanamiyama wa daibutsu sawagi" (お花見山は大仏さわぎ)	Raita Hiroshi	Mami Watanabe	March 31, 1990
10	"Swing Big! Dome Stadium" "Dai yure! Dōmu kyūjō" (大ゆれ! ドーム球場)	Shinji Takamatsu	Yasushi Hirano	April 7, 1990
11	"Large Discovery at the Ancient Ruins" "Kodai iseki de dai hakken" (古代遺跡で大はっけん)	Mitsuo Fukuda	Hideki Sonoda	April 14, 1990
12	"The Cake Has No Source!" "Kēki no moto ga nai!" (ケーキのもとがない!)	Toshifumi Kawase	Keiko Maruo	April 21, 1990
13	"Great Explosion at Mt. Fuji!?" "Fujisan dai bakuhatsu!?" (富士山大バクハツ!?)	Raita Hiroshi	Yasutaka Ito	April 28, 1990
14	"Mom is in Trouble!!" "Taihenda! Mama ga!" (たいへんだ! ママが!)	Shinji Takamatsu	Mami Watanabe	May 5, 1990
15	"Beware of the Dream Thief" "Yume dorobō ni goyōshin" (夢ドロボーにご用心)	Hiroshi Ishiodori	Yasushi Hirano; Shuichi Iwazaki	May 19, 1990
16	"Run! Supercar" "Hashire! Sūpākā" (走れ! スーパーカー)	Mitsuo Fukuda	Hideki Sonoda	May 26, 1990
17	"Protect the Computer" "Konpyūta o mamore" (コンピュータを守れ)	Toshifumi Kawase	Yasushi Hirano; Yasutaka Ito	June 2, 1990
18	"Time Has Messed Up" "Jikan ga mechakucha" (時間がめちゃくちゃ)	Raita Hiroshi	Keiko Maruo	June 9, 1990
19	"The Rainbow Waterfall Has Flooded" "Nijinotaki wa dai kōzui" (虹の滝は大洪水)	Shinji Takamatsu	Keiji Oba	June 16, 1990
20	"The Targeted Bride" "Nerawareta Hanayome" (ねらわれた花嫁)	Hiroshi Ishiodori	Mami Watanabe	June 23, 1990
21	"The Burning Movie Village" "Moeru Eigamura" (燃える映画村)	Mitsuo Fukuda	Takeshi Takaba	June 30, 1990
22	"Fuuko's Tanabata Story" "Fūko no Tanabata Monogatari" (フーコの七夕物語)	Toshifumi Kawase	Keiko Maruo	July 7, 1990
23	"Find the Idol!" "Aidoru wo Sagase!" (アイドルを探せ)	Raita Hiroshi	Norio Kashima	July 14, 1990
24	"Go! Go! Luxury Liner" (Go! Go! 豪華客船)	Shinji Takamatsu	Yasushi Hirano; Yasutaka Ito	July 21, 1990
25	"The Lost at Sea Virus" (海に消えた病原菌(ウイルス))	Hiroshi Ishiodori	Yasushi Hirano; Keiji Oba	July 28, 1990
26	"The Panda Cub Competition" (子パンダ争奪戦)	Directed by : Mitsuo Fukuda; Storyboarded by : Futa Morita	Mami Watanabe	August 4, 1990
27	"Defeat the Meteor Shower!" (流星群をぶっとばせ!)	Toshifumi Kawase	Yasushi Hirano; Yasutaka Ito	August 11, 1990
28	"Regain the Stars!" (夏を取り戻せ!)	Directed by : Hideaki Oba; Storyboarded by : Kunihisa Sugishima	Yasushi Hirano	August 18, 1990
29	"The Piggy Bank That Died in the Sky" (空に散った貯金箱)	Hiroshi Ishiodori	Keiko Maruo	August 25, 1990
30	"Papa is a Non-Smoker" (パパは禁煙中)	Shinji Takamatsu	Fumihiko Shimo	September 1, 1990
31	"Secret of the Geoglyphs" (地上絵のひみつ)	Mitsuo Fukuda	Hideki Sonoda	September 8, 1990
32	"It's Here! Super Giant Fusion" (出た！ 超巨大合体)	Toshifumi Kawase	Yasushi Hirano; Yasutaka Ito	September 22, 1990
33	"The Friend is a Young Kabuki" (友だちはカブキ小僧)	Hideaki Oba	Mami Watanabe	September 29, 1990
34	"Our Olympics" (ぼくらのオリンピック)	Hiroshi Ishiodori	Keiko Maruo	October 6, 1990
35	"A Concert for the Braves" (勇者に贈る音楽会)	Shinji Takamatsu	Fumihiko Shimo	October 13, 1990
36	"The Halloween Monster" (ハロウィンの怪物)	Toshifumi Kawase	Keiko Maruo	October 20, 1990
37	"The Monster Library" (かいぶつ図書館)	Mitsuo Fukuda	Fumihiko Shimo	November 3, 1990
38	"The White Horse That Becomes the Wind" (風になれ 白い馬)	Hideaki Oba	Yasushi Hirano; Yasutaka Ito	November 10, 1990
39	"Aim to be a Space Pilot" (めざせ宇宙パイロット)	Hiroshi Ishiodori	Yasushi Hirano	November 17, 1990
40	"Devastating! Geister Base" (壊滅！ガイスター基地)	Shinji Takamatsu	Mami Watanabe	November 24, 1990
41	"Mario and Juliet" (マリオとジュリエット)	Directed by : Kiyotaka Ohata; Storyboarded by : Futa Morita	Fumihiko Shimo	December 1, 1990
42	"The Fire Truck Mobilizes" (消防車 出動せよ!)	Hideaki Oba	Keiko Maruo	December 8, 1990
43	"Takumi Likes School?!" (タクミは学校が好き?!)	Directed by : Hiroshi Ishiodori; Storyboarded by : Kunihisa Sugishima	Yasushi Hirano; Shuichi Iwazaki	December 15, 1990
44	"There's a Lot of Santas" (サンタさんがいっぱい)	Shinji Takamatsu	Mami Watanabe	December 22, 1990
45	"The Great Adventure in the Pyramid" (ピラミッドで大冒険)	Hiroshi Ishiodori	Hideki Sonoda	December 29, 1990
46	"The Offshore Oil Trap" (海底油田の罠)	Directed by : Kiyotaka Ohata; Storyboarded by : Kunihisa Sugishima	Yasushi Hirano; Yasutaka Ito	January 12, 1991
47	"The Snow Country's War" (雪国の決戦)	Hideaki Oba	Yasushi Hirano; Atsuhiro Tomioka	January 19, 1991
48	"A Real Treasure" (本当の宝物)	Directed by : Hiroshi Ishiodori; Storyboarded by : Mitsuo Fukuda	Yasushi Hirano	January 26, 1991

== Video games ==
Brave Exkaiser appears in the two Brave Saga games which were published by Takara and released on the PlayStation in 1998 and 2000 respectively as well as appearing in Brave Saga: Shinsou Astaria for the Game Boy Color in 2001 and later New Century Brave Wars for the PlayStation 2 in 2005. In 2003, Brave Exkaiser appears in Kikou Heidan J Phoenix + for the Xbox as an unlockable mech. In 2019, Brave Exkaiser appeared in the Super Robot Wars X-Ω mobile game, making it the third Brave series to debut in the Super Robot Wars franchise, after GaoGaiGar's debut in 2nd Super Robot Wars Alpha and Might Gaine's debut in Super Robot Wars V. And J-Decker in Super Robot Wars 30.

Preceded by None	Brave series 1990-1991	Succeeded by The Brave of Sun Fighbird
