= The Brave Fighter of Legend Da-Garn =

1992 Japanese mecha anime television series

- 伝説の勇者ダ・ガーン
- Genre: Adventure, Mecha, action, science fiction
- Created by: Hajime Yatate
- Developed by: Fuyunori Gobu (#1–28); Yasushi Hirano (#29–46)
- Directed by: Katsuyoshi Yatabe
- Music by: Yasunori Iwasaki
- Country of origin: Japan
- Original language: Japanese
- No. of episodes: 46

Production
- Producers: Makoto Imai (Nagoya TV); Asami Ohara (Tokyu Agency); Takayuki Yoshii (Sunrise); Toru Hasegawa (Sunrise)
- Production companies: Nagoya TV; Tokyu Agency; Sunrise

Original release
- Network: ANN (Nagoya TV, TV Asahi)
- Release: February 8, 1992 – January 23, 1993

The Brave of Legend Da-Garn (Japanese: 伝説の勇者ダ・ガーン, Hepburn: Densetsu no Yūsha Da Gān; initially translated as The Brave Fighter of Legend Da-Garn), sometimes simply Da-Garn, is a Japanese anime television series that aired in 1992, created by Sunrise under the direction of Shinji Takamatsu, and is the third of the long running Yuusha or "Brave" series. The official Japanese title does not include the word "Fighter" in the title, despite the fact it appears on the Japanese DVD box art.

== Story ==
Seiji Takasugi obtained a jewel called "Aurin" which is the earth's alter ego and it has elected him to be the commander of eight brave robots. The Brave robots are sleeping in many parts of the world as "Brave Stones". However, they become super robots by fusing with modern people and machines once Seiji awakens them and they soon follow his instructions. Their enemy is Lord Oh-Boss who is an invader who aims at stealing the planet's energy with the aid of his subordinates that Da-Garn and the other brave robots must stop in order to save the world.

== Protagonists ==
- Seiji Takasugi (高杉 星史, Takasugi Seiji): Son of a newscaster and Colonel of the Japanese Army and an ordinary, cheerful, and hot-blooded 6th grader chosen by the Aurin to protect the Earth from Alien invasion and becoming the boss of the Brave Fighters. Compared to the rest of the cast he has massive lapses in judgment and common sense. Voiced by Rica Matsumoto
- Hikaru Kosaka (香坂 ひかる, Kousaka Hikaru): Seiji's childhood friend and neighbor who is a strong-minded and brisk tomboy who gets upset when Seiji's with other girls. Due to Seiji's parents never being around, Hikaru looks over Seiji, often arguing with him. Voiced by Sayuri Yamauchi
- Hotaru Sakurakoji (桜小路 蛍, Sakurakouji Hotaru): A classmate of Seiji that lives with her grandmother. Hotaru happens to be a girl with psychic powers and has the ability to hear the voice of the earth. Due to this, Seiji sometimes depends on her for help. Voiced by Yuri Shiratori
- Yancha (ヤンチャー, Yanchā): The cheeky but sustainable boy who controls Seven Changer and was originally a prince. He was forced to come to Earth after Oh-Boss destroyed his home planet searching for Planet Energy. When he and Seiji first met, they did not get along. Voiced by Urara Takano

== Antagonists ==
- Red Lone (レッド・ロン, Reddo Ron): The first enemy to invade Earth and heavily resembles Char Aznable from Mobile Suit Gundam. As the story continues he becomes part machine and controls a robot named Red Geist. Voiced by Ikuya Sawaki
- Lady Pinky (レディ・ピンキー, Redi Pinkī): A human-like alien that can transform into three forms consisting of a child form, teenage form, and her main adult form. For the first half of the series she attends school in her child form with Seiji for investigations on the robot's leader. Voiced by Yumi Tōma
- De Butcho (デ・ブッチョ, De Buccho): A toad-like alien skilled in biology and chemistry that was basically considered useless. After he failed his last mission he was killed by Violecche but brought back to life again into eight smaller versions of himself. Voiced by Kōzō Shioya
- Violecche (ビオレッツェ, Biorettse): Like Lady Pinky, Violecche also has the ability to transform into three different forms, a cat, a wolf, and a human-like creature. Voiced by Kiyoyuki Yanada
- Cyan (シアン, Shian): The second most powerful villain in the series after Oh-Boss himself. He is often disguised as a UFO while his true form is that of a dragon. Out of all of the antagonists he is the most loyal to Oh-Boss. Voiced by Shigezō Sasaoka
- Oh-Boss (オーボス, Ōbosu): The main antagonist of the series, an abstract cosmic entity born at the beginning of the universe that consumes Planet Energy much like a black hole. He commands a moon-like based called the Star of Oh-Boss in which he commands his minions to cruelly torture a planet for fun before consuming their Planet Energy. He is depicted as a purple ghost with psychic and electrical powers. Voiced by Koichi Chiba

== Brave Fighters ==
=== Da-Garn Team ===
- Great Da-Garn GX (グレートダ・ガーンGX, Gurēto Da-Gān GX) (Voiced by Shō Hayami): The combination of Ga-Ohn and Da-Garn X.
  - Da-Garn X/Da-Garn Jet (ダ・ガーンX / ダ・ガーンジェット, Da-Gān X / Da-Gān Jetto) (Voiced by Shō Hayami): The combination of Da-Garn, Earth Liner and Earth Fighter.
    - Da-Garn (ダ・ガーン, Da-Gān) (Voiced by Shō Hayami): A police patrol car based on Lamborghini Diablo that can change into a robot at will. Once fused with a Brave stone from a temple, he forms the torso of Da-Garn X. He is the leader of the Brave fighters in the series. Da-Garn temporally stayed within the earth to repair damage that happened while the Brave Fighters we're battling in Africa. But he eventually returned to lead the Brave Fighters again.
    - Earth Liner (アースライナー, Āsu Rainā) : Based on Shinkansen 300 bullet train. It forms the lower half (below the torso) of Da-Garn X when combined with Da-Garn and the Earth Fighter.
    - Earth Fighter (アースファイター, Āsu Faitā) : A white, red and blue fighter jet that forms the top half (above the torso) of Da-Garn X when combined with Da-Garn and the Earth Liner.
  - Ga-Ohn (ガ・オーン, Ga-Ōn) (Voiced by Shō Hayami): A lion Brave Fighter awakened at Mt. Kilimanjaro when the continent of Africa was splitting in half. Ga-Ohn is the final Brave Fighter and just like Hawk Saber, he wasn't awakened by a Brave Stone. He forms the body additions of Great Da-Garn GX.

=== Sabers (セイバーズ, Seibāzu) ===
The group of Brave fighters that can fly. As Sky Saber, Jet Saber, Shuttle Saber and Jumbo Saber were killed by Seven Changer, but were revived by Hawk Saber. During the final battle, the Sabers went back to sleep as Brave Stones. Being fliers, the Sabers all have fighter jet pilot-like visors and speak in an Air Force-like manner, referring to Seiji as "Captain".

- Pegasus Saber (ペガサスセイバー, Pegasasu Seibā) (Voiced by Nobutoshi Canna): The combination of all the Sabers and is a centaur-like robot.
  - Sky Saber (スカイセイバー, Sukai Seibā) (Voiced by Shunsuke Takamiya): The combination of Jet Saber, Jumbo Saber and Shuttle Saber.
    - Jet Saber (ジェットセイバー, Jetto Seibā) (Voiced by Shunsuke Takamiya): A blue two-person jet based on Grumman F-14 Tomcat that can change into a robot after its Brave Stone which was found at an excavation site in Antarctica was activated by the Orin. Jet Saber forms the wings, upper torso and arms of Sky Saber when combined with Jumbo Saber and Shuttle Saber. It forms the wings and a part of the torso of Pegasus Saber when combined with the three other Sabers.
    - Jumbo Saber (ジャンボセイバー, Janbo Seibā) (Voiced by Mitsuaki Hoshino): The leader of the Sabers. A jumbo passenger aircraft based on Boeing 747 that can change into a robot at will. Its Brave Stone was attached to an Egyptian sarcophagus that was on board the aircraft when it was activated. Jumbo Saber forms the torso of Sky Saber when combined with Jet Saber and Shuttle Sabers. It also forms the torso of Pegasus Saber when combined with the three other Sabers.
    - Shuttle Saber (シャトルセイバー, Shatoru Seibā) (Voiced by Ikuya Sawaki): A space shuttle based on NASA space shuttle that changes into a robot. Its Brave Stone was one of the materials the space shuttle was transporting when it was activated. Shuttle Saber forms the legs of Sky Saber when combined with Jet Saber and Jumbo Saber. It forms the legs of Pegasus Saber when combined with the three other Sabers.
  - Hawk Saber (ホークセイバー, Hōku Seibā) (Voiced by Nobutoshi Canna): A bird Brave Fighter awakened at the Cave of Light to protect the Earth's skies, also the first fighter to have a physical form and not be awakened from a Brave Stone. He is also the only Saber not to have a plane vehicle mode. He forms the torso and head of Pegasus Saber when combined with the three other Sabers.

=== Landers (ランダーズ, Randāzu) ===
The group of Brave fighters that are on the ground. Like the Sabers, the Landers sacrificed their strength to Great Da Garn GX before going back to sleep. Being all land vehicles, the Landers speak with a cocky street gang-ish manner, referring Seiji as "Boss".

- Land Bison (ランドバイソン, Rando Baison) (Voiced by Bin Shimada): The combination of the Landers.
  - Big Lander (ビッグランダー, Biggu Randā) (Voiced by Bin Shimada): The leader of the Landers. Based on Kenworth T600 semi-trailer truck. Its Brave Stone was discovered in an Australian mine. Big Lander forms the legs of Land Bison when combined with the other Landers.
  - Drill Lander (ドリルランダー, Doriru Randā) (Voiced by Naoki Makishima): A navy drilling vehicle. Its Brave Stone was activated in Australia, similarly to Big Lander's Brave Stone. Drill Lander forms the arms and shoulders of Land Bison when combined with the other Landers.
  - Mach Lander (マッハランダー, Mahha Randā) (Voiced by Yoshio Kawai): A yellow Formula One car based on Ferrari 642 and its Brave Stone was found in England. Mach Lander forms the lower torso of Land Bison when combined with the other Landers.
  - Turbo Lander (ターボランダー, Tābo Randā) (Voiced by Kiyoyuki Yanada): A red sports car based on Chevrolet Corvette (C3), originally owned by an English woman, Julia. Its Brave Stone was awakened in England like Mach Lander's. Turbo Lander forms the upper torso of Land Bison when combined with the other Landers.

=== Other Brave Fighters ===
- Seven Changer (セブンチェンジャー, Sebun Chenjā) (Voiced by Takehito Koyasu): A Brave Fighter from another planet who acts as an enemy for the first three quarters of the series. He has the ability to change into seven different modes which are a tank, a panther, a griffin, a jet, a semi truck and a space orbit/submarine mode. Later on his true identity becomes revealed to the enemy so he helps Da-Garn and the other Brave Fighters defeat Oh-Boss. According to Yancha's father he was known as the "God of Legend" on his home world.

== Oh-Boss Forces ==
=== Combat Troopers ===
- Redlone's Cruiser: flight, storage, missiles, lasers, and a robot mode armed with torso triple energy heavy cannon, dual hip double barreled energy cannons, storing kamikaze saucers, and machine gun turrets.
- Liken Alpha: Appear in episodes 1, 2, and 10. Powers include energy ball form, bladed star form, flight, laser machine gun arms, and shoulder missiles.
- Liken Beta: Appear in episode 4. Their only known power is flight.
- Wolf G1-40 Beta: Appears in episode 2. Powers include flight and a mouth beam
- Adler V: Appears in episode 3. Powers include flight, a 6-tube missile pod in the torso, forehead lasers, a launchable back wings, and launchable fists.
- Daimler II: Appears in episode 4. Powers include flight, finger machine guns, and self destructing. It resembles the Zeong from Mobile Suit Gundam.
- Angrans: Appear in episode 5. Powers include a drill shield right hand, shoulder heat rays with a rapid-fire mode, and a vacuum tube in the left hand.
- Tracegon: Appears in episode 6. Powers include flight, an underside scanning laser that can emit explosive energy and be used to copy machines, speed, and machine gun arms.
- Erbenroy: Appears in episode 7. Powers include shield armed with three bomb launchers, flight, and a large forked sword.
  - Erbenroy Kai: Appear in episode 32. Powers include Powers include flight, a beam machine gun, and an electric tentacle in the right wrist.
- Selene Alpha: Appears in episode 8. Powers include swimming, a pair of energy whips for each arm, twin energy beams in the torso powered by a fan in the wings, levitation, and wing missiles.
- Redlone Eye: Appear throughout the series starting in episode 9. Their only known power is energy reservoir absorption.
- Metal Battler: Appear in episode 9. Powers include flight, underside energy beams in saucer mode, claw hands that can fire energy bolts, shoulder energy cannons, and an 8-tube torso machine gun.
- Kraken: Appears in episode 10. Powers include adept swimming and a pair of crab claws.

=== Armored Beasts ===
- Joanna: Appears in episode 11. Powers include life draining roots that can detect robot disguises, vine regeneration, and eye beams. Reappears in Brave Saga.
- Elizabeth: Appears in episode 12. Powers include dividing into cat-rabbit hybrids, high jumping, and two coiling tails.
- Victoria: Appear in episode 13. Powers include burrowing, energy absorbing webs from the spinneret, pincer claws, mouth flames, and combining.
  - Queen Victoria: Appears in episode 13. Powers include coiling, dividing into Victorias, and burrowing.
- Francois: Appears in episode 14. Powers include flight and a long tongue.
- Jennifer: Appears in episode 14. Powers include pink acid from the head, a rubber-like body, and extendable tentacles from the shoulders and fingers.
- Caroline: Appear in episode 15. Their only known power is flight.
- Diane: Appears in episodes 15 and 40. Powers include swimming, saw-like feet, spewing mouth acid, and size growth that absorbs projects until it commits mitosis.
- Audrey: Appears in episode 16. Powers include speed, sharp claws, and a long tongue.
- Irene: Appear in episode 17. Powers include an underside drill, emitting sticky goo, an extendable neck, and three machine guns in each shoulder.
- Catherine: 17. Powers include burrowing, four electric tentacles, a laser cannon, and extendable spikes around the body.
- Margarete: 18. Powers include super sonic flight, tooth missiles, razor wings, extendable tentacles
- Annette: 18. Powers include super sonic flight and a machine gun in each snail-like antenna.
- Misery: Appears in episode 19. Powers include four claw arms, extendable tentacles, regeneration, severed pieces becoming individual life forms, and doubling in size every hour.
- Butcho's Fortress: Appears in episodes 19 and 20. Powers include flight, lasers all around the body, spy beast combining beam from the underside, and internal vine defenses.
- Lillian and Lauren: Appears in episode 20. Powers include flight and a pair of heads.
- Marie Antoinette: Appear in episode 20. Powers include extendable left arms, reformation, and mouth lasers.
- Gracie: Appears in episodes 30 and 34. Powers include gusts from the false head's mouth, flight, two heads in the false head, three spike missiles from the based on each wing, green adhesives from the mouth, and energy beams from the hole between its necks and from each mouth.
- Flora: Appears in episode 33. Powers include swimming, tentacle lasers, dividing into flying laser guns, and electric shocks. Reappears in Brave Saga 2.
- Veronica: Appears in episodes 34 and 35. Powers include flight, a hidden body buzzsaw, pedal missiles, tentacles with red electric bolts, burrowing, and swimming.
- Jenvuivu: Appears in episode 37. Powers include flight, firing green energy bolts from the body, dividing into three section that can spawn an electric cage, and a tractor beam.

=== Killer Dolls ===
- Shanerun: Appears in episode 21. Powers include flight, summoning three drones, and palm energy balls.
  - Shanerun Drones 1, 2, and 3: Appear in episode 21. Powers include flight, disc bombs, and lasers from the palms and soles.
- V Vuitton: Appears in episode 22. Powers include flight, finger rockets and machine guns, and an electric whip.
- Jubanshi: Appears in episode 23. Powers include dividing into stuffed animals with cameras and teeth, a bladed fan, and a mouth flamethrower.
- Eve: Appears in episode 25. Powers include flight and torso missiles and spikes.
- San: Appears in episode 25. Powers include flight and twin boomerang-like spears.
- Rolan: Appears in episode 25. Powers include flight and a bo staff that fires lasers.
- Lady Pinky's Fortress: Appears in episodes 28 and 29. Powers include flight, storage, and laser turrets around the top base.
- Gian: Appears in episode 29. Powers include flight, drill missiles from the gold stashes and shoulders, a boomerang on the left shoulder, extendable spear fingers, spinning fast enough to form a drill, and a pink energy whip in the right wrist.
- Kaldan: Appears in episode 31. Powers include flight, shoulder missiles, and an electric whip.
- Morie: Appears in episodes 34 and 35. Powers include flight, wing heat rays, torso lasers, wing missiles, tentacles with red electric bolts, and swimming. Reappears in Brave Saga.
- Albernie: Appears in episode 39. Powers include flight, back and torso missiles, talons, and bladed launchable wings.
- Dior: Appears in episode 42. Powers include flight and a torso missile pod,
- Gorgeous: Appears in episode 43. Powers include flight, a pair of remote controlled hands armed with restraining nails, extendable constricting hair, and self-destruction.

=== Other ===
- Violecche's Fortress: Appears throughout the series. Powers include flight, storage, rock-like mines, laser turrets, and remote flying blades.
- Mustang VX: Appears in episode 26. Powers include spiked treads, twin energy cannons, and emitting pink electricity.
- Joinda MF: Appears in episode 27. Powers include levitation, crystallizing spikes from the body that possess machines, and limb regeneration.
- Red Geist: Appears in episodes 32, 34, 35, 37, 38, 40, 44, 45, and 46. Powers include flight, dual shoulder laser cannons, mouth missiles, swimming, and mouth energy balls designed to entrap in dragon form and flight, shield, head vulcan guns, a beam machine gun, swimming, back missiles, a chained mace, and a sword in humanoid mode. Reappears in Brave Saga and Brave Saga 2. Red Geist is a re-design of the character Deathsaurus from Transformers: Victory and despite his name, he is of no relation to the Geisters, the main antagonists from Brave Exkaiser.
- Battle Saucer: Appear in episodes 36, 41, 42, and 45. Powers include flight, underside blue energy bolts, and spear crab claws armed with green energy bolts.

== Episodes ==
No.	Title	Directed by	Written by	Original release date
1	"A Message from Earth" "Chikyū kara no Messēji" (地球からのメッセージ)	Directed by : Kiyotaka Ohata; Storyboarded by : Futa Morita	Fuyunori Gobu	February 8, 1992
2	"The Boy Who Became a Captain" "Taichō ni Natta Shōnen" (隊長になった少年)	Shinji Takamatsu	Fuyunori Gobu	February 15, 1992
3	"Find the Hero's Stone" "Yūsha no Ishi o Sagase" (勇者の石を探せ)	Hideaki Oba	Fumihiko Shimo	February 22, 1992
4	"Antarctic Storm" "Nankyoku no Arashi" (南極の嵐)	Kunihisa Sugishima	Yasushi Hirano	February 29, 1992
5	"The Dinosaur Graveyard" "Kyōryū Hakaba" (恐竜墓場)	Directed by : Mitsuo Fukuda; Storyboarded by : Kazuhito Kikuchi	Hiroyuki Kawasaki	March 7, 1992
6	"The Eighth Hero" "8-Hitome no Yūsha" (8人目の勇者)	Kiyotaka Ohata	Hiroyuki Kawasaki	March 14, 1992
7	"Charging Redlone" "Shutsugeki Reddoron" (出撃レッドロン)	Shinji Takamatsu	Fuyunori Gobu	March 21, 1992
8	"The Great Battle of the South Seas" "Nankai no Daisakusen" (南海の大決戦)	Hideaki Oba	Fumihiko Shimo	March 28, 1992
9	"A Gift from Redlone" "Reddoron kara no Okurimono" (レッドロンからの贈り物)	Kunihisa Sugishima	Hiroyuki Kawasaki	April 4, 1992
10	"Special Move! Break the Combination" "Hissatsu! Gattai-yaburi" (必殺!合体破り)	Mitsuo Fukuda	Yasushi Hirano	April 11, 1992
11	"Space Plant Attack" "Uchū Shokubutsu no Shūgeki" (宇宙植物の襲撃)	Directed by : Shinji Takamatsu; Storyboarded by : Futa Morita	Yasushi Hirano	April 18, 1992
12	"Street Corner Spies" "Machikado no Supai" (街角のスパイ)	Directed by : Kiyotaka Ohata; Storyboarded by : Kazuhito Kikuchi	Fuyunori Gobu	April 25, 1992
13	"Fireflies in the Forest" "Mori no Naka no Hotaru" (森の中の螢)	Hideaki Oba	Fumihiko Shimo	May 2, 1992
14	"Heart-pounding Date with Pink!" "Doki Doki Pinku to Dēto!" (ドキドキピンクとデート!)	Kunihisa Sugishima	Hiroyuki Kawasaki	May 9, 1992
15	"Secrets of the Circus" "Sākasu no Himitsu" (サーカスの秘密)	Mitsuo Fukuda	Fuyunori Gobu	May 16, 1992
16	"Who's the Suspicious One?!" "Ayashī no wa Docchida?!" (怪しいのはどっちだ?!)	Shinji Takamatsu	Yasushi Hirano	May 23, 1992
17	"The Sabers Die?!" "Seibāzu Shisu?!" (セイバーズ死す?!)	Kiyotaka Ohata	Fumihiko Shimo	May 30, 1992
18	"Revive! Heroes" "Yomigaere! Yūsha" (よみがえれ!勇者)	Hideaki Oba	Hiroyuki Kawasaki	June 6, 1992
19	"Pegasus Saber Appears" "Pegasasuseibā Tōjō" (ペガサスセイバー登場)	Kunihisa Sugishima	Yasushi Hirano	June 13, 1992
20	"Butcho's Final Challenge" "Buccho Saigo no Chōsen" (ブッチョ最後の挑戦)	Directed by : Kiyotaka Ohata; Storyboarded by : Mitsuo Fukuda	Fumihiko Shimo	June 20, 1992
21	"Cats Lurking in the Darkness" "Yami ni Hisomu Neko" (闇にひそむ猫)	Directed by : Kota Morita; Storyboarded by : Futa Morita	Fuyunori Gobu	June 27, 1992
22	"The Director is Lost" "Otoshimono wa Dairekutā" (落とし物はダイレクター)	Shinji Takamatsu	Hiroyuki Kawasaki	July 4, 1992
23	"The Dancing Spy Doll" "Odoru Supai Ningyō" (踊るスパイ人形)	Hideaki Oba	Yasushi Hirano	July 11, 1992
24	"A Continent Torn Apart" "Hikisaka Reru Tairiku" (引き裂かれる大陸)	Kunihisa Sugishima	Fumihiko Shimo	July 18, 1992
25	"Kilimanjaro's Hero" "Kirimanjaro no Yūsha" (キリマンジャロの勇者)	Tsuneo Tominaga	Fuyunori Gobu	July 25, 1992
26	"The Blocked City" "Fūsa sa reta Machi" (封鎖された街)	Kiyotaka Ohata	Yasushi Hirano	August 1, 1992
27	"Investigate the Captain" "Taichō o Chōsa Seyo" (隊長を調査せよ)	Shinji Takamatsu	Hiroyuki Kawasaki	August 8, 1992
28	"Our Friend is a Witch?!" "Tomodachi wa Mago?!" (友達は魔女?!)	Hideaki Oba	Fumihiko Shimo	August 15, 1992
29	"Revival! Da-Garn" "Fukkatsu! Da・Gān" (復活!ダ･ガーン)	Kunihisa Sugishima	Fuyunori Gobu	August 22, 1992
30	"The Mysterious Boy" "Nazo no Shōnen" (謎の少年)	Directed by : Kiyotaka Ohata; Storyboarded by : Futa Morita	Hiroyuki Kawasaki	August 29, 1992
31	"Another Captain" "Mōhitori no Taichō" (もう一人の隊長)	Directed by : Osamu Sekita; Storyboarded by : Tsuneo Tominaga	Fumihiko Shimo	September 12, 1992
32	"Redlone's Counterattack" "Gyakushū no Reddoron" (逆襲のレッドロン)	Directed by : Naoki Hishikawa; Storyboarded by : Shinji Takamatsu	Yasushi Hirano	September 26, 1992
33	"Targeted Ruins" "Nerawa reta Iseki" (狙われた遺跡)	Kunihisa Sugishima	Katsuyoshi Yatabe	October 3, 1992
34	"The Captain's Qualifications" "Taichō no Shikaku" (隊長の資格)	Directed by : Kiyotaka Ohata; Storyboarded by : Futa Morita	Hiroyuki Kawasaki	October 10, 1992
35	"Listen to the Songs of the Stars" "Chikyū (Hoshi) no Uta o Kike" (地球(ほし)の歌を聞け)	Osamu Sekita	Fumihiko Shimo	October 17, 1992
36	"The Hidden Legend" "Hime Rareta Densetsu" (秘められた伝説)	Directed by : Naoki Hishikawa; Storyboarded by : Kazuhito Kikuchi	Yasushi Hirano	October 24, 1992
37	"Our Planet" "Oretachi no Wakusei (Hoshi)" (俺たちの惑星(ほし))	Kunihisa Sugishima	Yasushi Hirano	November 7, 1992
38	"Showdown! Red Geist" "Taiketsu! Reddogaisuto" (対決!レッドガイスト)	Hideaki Oba	Fuyunori Gobu	November 14, 1992
39	"Stolen Big Lander" "Ubawareta Biggurandā" (奪われたビッグランダー)	Directed by : Kiyotaka Ohata; Storyboarded by : Futa Morita	Fumihiko Shimo	November 21, 1992
40	"The Reunion in the Jungle" "Mitsurin no Saikai" (密林の再会)	Osamu Sekita	Yasushi Hirano	November 28, 1992
41	"Close Approach! Oh-Boss' Planet" "Dai Sekkin! Ōbosu Hoshi" (大接近!オーボス星)	Kunihisa Sugishima	Fuyunori Gobu	December 5, 1992
42	"Appear! Power of Legend" "Shutsugen! Densetsu no Chikara" (出現!伝説の力)	Naoki Hishikawa	Yasushi Hirano; Fumihiko Shimo	December 12, 1992
43	"Commander, Give Your Orders!" "Taichō, Meirei o" (隊長、命令を!)	Hideaki Oba	Hiroyuki Kawasaki	December 19, 1992
44	"Battle on Planet OhBoss" "Ōbosu-boshi no Kessen" (オーボス星の決戦)	Directed by : Kiyotaka Ohata; Storyboarded by : Kazuhito Kikuchi	Yasushi Hirano	December 26, 1992
45	"Earth in Dire Straits" "Chikyū Zettai Zetsumei" (地球絶体絶命)	Directed by : Kunihisa Sugishima; Storyboarded by : Tsuneo Tominaga	Yasushi Hirano	January 9, 1993
46	"Towards a Windy Future" "Kaze no Mirai e" (風の未来へ)	Directed by : Kota Morita; Storyboarded by : Futa Morita	Yasushi Hirano	January 23, 1993

Preceded by The Brave of Sun Fighbird	Brave series 1992–1993	Succeeded by The Brave Express Might Gaine
