= Shotacon =

Genre of sexualized young or young-looking male characters

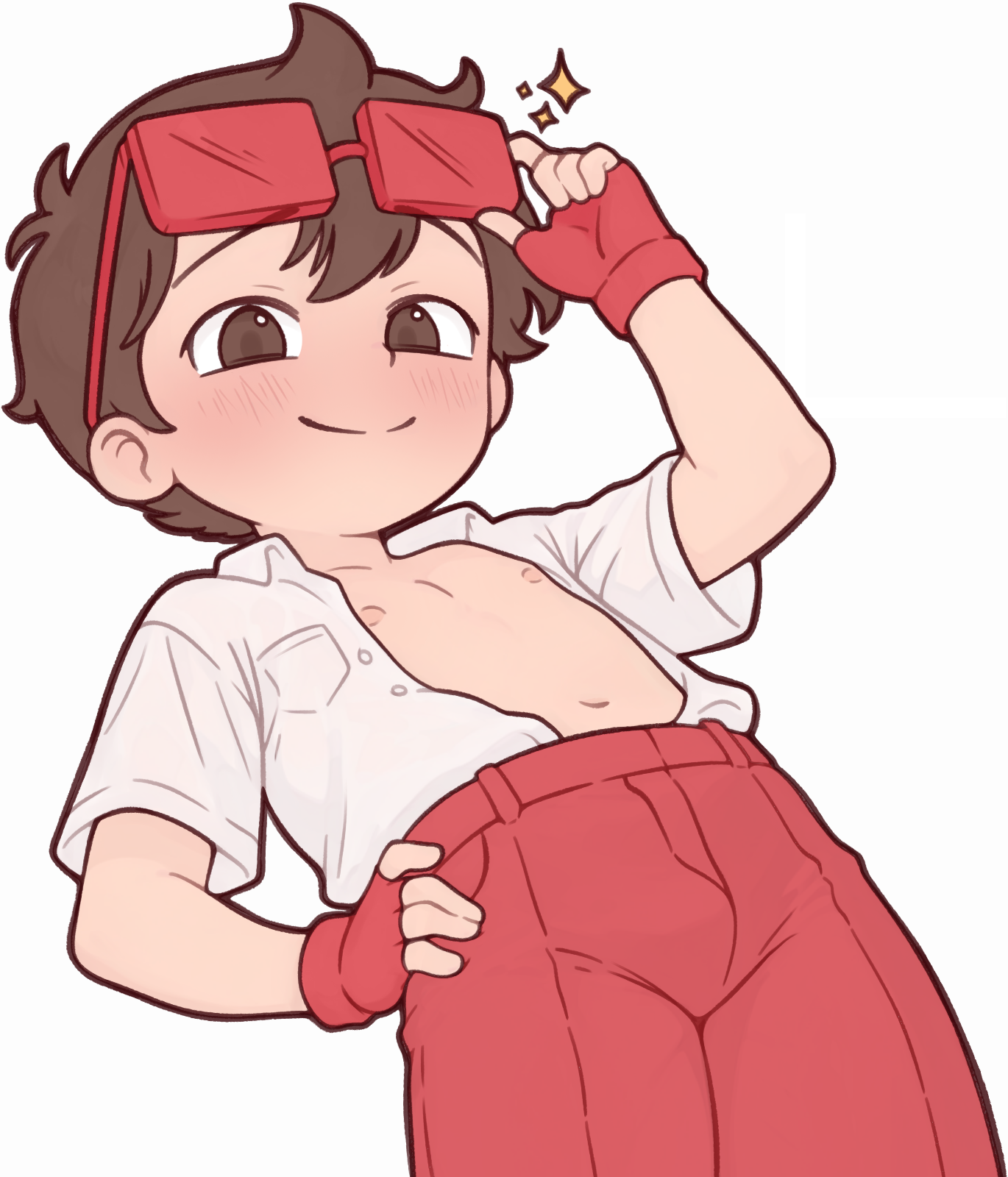
- Branch: Cartoon pornography; Erotic art; Lolicon
- Years active: Early 1980s–present
- Major figures: Tamaki Saitō; Katsuki Hamamatsu; Masanobu Komaki
- Influences: Boys' love; Bishōnen; Dōjinshi; Lolicon; Yaoi

Shotacon (ショタコン, shotakon), abbreviated from Shōtarō complex (正太郎コンプレックス, shōtarō konpurekkusu), refers to the attraction to young (or young-looking) boy characters, mainly in the context of fictional artwork, animation, etc. The term may also be used to describe one who feels such an attraction.

The genre is understood to have come about as an offshoot of women's manga from the then-nascent self-publishing dōjinshi culture of the early 1980s, further diversifying as its readership grew. Shotacon works feature prepubescent or pubescent male characters often depicted in a suggestive or erotic manner, whether in the obvious role of an object of attraction, or the less apparent role of "subject" for the reader to associate with. In both Western and Japanese fan cultures, it describes works that range from the explicitly pornographic to mildly suggestive, romantic, or entirely nonsexual. A closely related term for the attraction to (or art pertaining to the erotic portrayal of) young girls is lolicon.

Shotacon imagery which is pornographic is illegal in various countries, and in a legal grey zone in various others.

== Etymology ==
The term "shotacon" is a Japanese contraction of Shōtarō complex (正太郎コンプレックス, Shōtarō konpurekkusu), a reference to the young male character Shōtarō (正太郎) from Tetsujin 28-go. It was coined in 1981 by the editor of the anime magazine Fanroad, Katsuki Hamamatsu (known as Initial Biscuit no K), in response to a reader who inquired about a female equivalent to the word "lolicon". The character Shōtarō was suggested to him by fellow editor Masanobu Komaki (of Animec magazine). It later began taking precedence over other expressions such as little boy complex (リボコン, ribocon) or shōnen-ai (少年愛). In the anime and manga series, Shōtarō is a bold, self-assertive detective who frequently outwits his adversaries and helps to solve cases. Throughout the series, he develops close friends within the world. His bishōnen cuteness embodied and formed the term, putting a name to an old sexual subculture.

== Origins ==
Where the concept developed is hard to pinpoint, but some of its earliest roots are in reader responses to detective series written by Edogawa Rampo. In his works, a character named Yoshio Kobayashi of "Shōnentanteidan" (Junior Detective Group, similar to the Baker Street Irregulars of Sherlock Holmes) forms a deep dependency with adult protagonist Kogoro Akechi. Kobayashi, a beautiful teenager, constantly concerns himself with Kogoro's cases and well-being, and for a time moves in with the unmarried man. This nonsexual but intimate adult-boy relationship, in part, inspired the evolution of the shotacon community.

Tamaki Saitō writes that although the modern shotacon audience has a roughly even split between males and females, the genre is rumored to have roots in early 1980s dōjinshi as an offshoot of yaoi. Saitō suggests that shotacon was adopted by male readers who were influenced by lolicon; thus, he claims "shota texts by female yaoi authors are structurally identical to yaoi texts, while shota by male otaku clearly position these little boys as young girls with penises". Kaoru Nagayama writes that the 1995 manga anthology U.C. BOYS: Under Cover Boys started a boom in commercial shotacon in the second half of the 1990s. During this time, male-oriented shotacon emerged and mixed with female-oriented shotacon: "the situation was such that shota works targeting women, men and a combination of both were all in close proximity." The boom collapsed at the end of the 1990s, but male-targeted shotacon saw a small resurgence starting in 2002.

== Elements ==
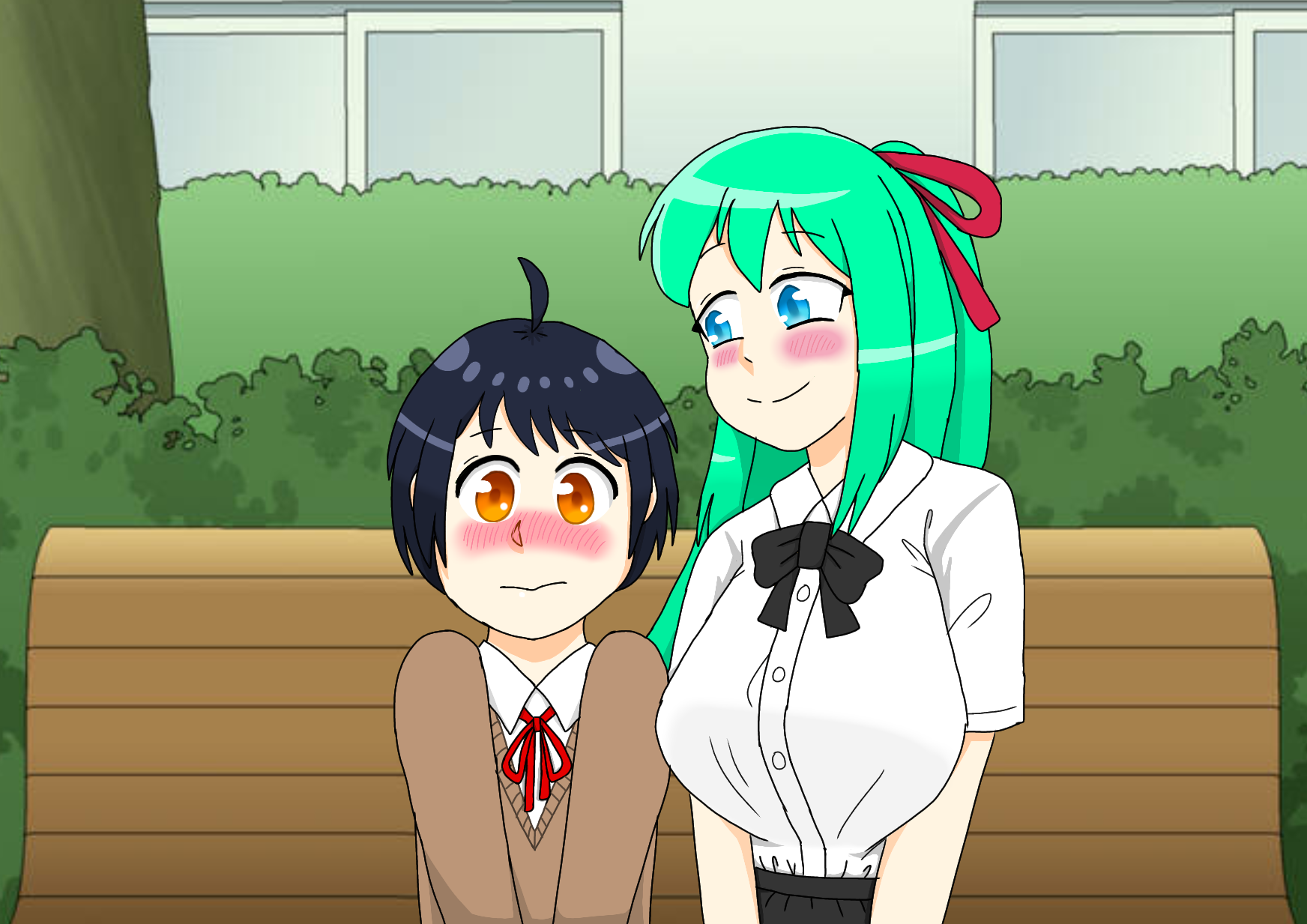
A manga-style illustration of onē-shota

Stories and interactions found in shotacon works will often take on attributes that are characteristic of other genres. For example, the boy character (the shota) may be paired with an older boy or man in a homoerotic setup like those most commonly found in boys' love works meant for female readers. Such relationships are comparatively common in shōjo manga as well, as in the popular translated manga Loveless, which features an eroticized but unconsummated relationship between the 12-year-old male protagonist and a 20-year-old male, or the young-appearing character Honey in Ouran High School Host Club. Seinen manga, primarily aimed at otaku, also occasionally presents eroticized adolescent males in a non-pornographic context, such as Yoshinori "Yuki" Ikeda, the cross-dressing 14-year-old boy in Yubisaki Milk Tea. They may also be found in male-oriented works such as Boku no Pico. The boy can also be paired with a female character, in which case the work might be classified as "straight shota". When the shota is paired with an older girl or woman, it is known as onē-shota (おねショタ), a blend of onē-san (お姉さん, meaning "older sister" or "young lady") and shota. Adolescent or adult characters with neotenic features that make them appear younger than they are may also feature. As with lolicon, shotacon shares a close relation to the concepts of kawaii (cuteness) and moe (in which characters are presented as young, cute or helpless in order to increase reader identification and inspire protective feelings), motifs found in a variety of children's media.

Shotacon for male readers may feature either homosexual or heterosexual relationships. (Note: Male-male seijin shotacon is not properly considered yaoi, and is published and marketed separately in Japan, but these genres are often conflated in Western terminology.) Both gay and straight shotacon typically involve interactions between smaller, often pubescent males and young adults (older brother/sister figures), sexually frustrated authority figures (teacher/boss), significantly older "uncle/aunt" figures (neighborhood acquaintances, actual family members), or parent figures (adopted, step, or full blood relation). Outside of these tropes, stories that involve only young boys (with no older characters) are not rare, with the most common recurring theme being a relationship between classmates.

== Publications ==
Shotacon stories are commonly released in semi-monthly anthologies. Sometimes, however, a manga artist will publish individual manga volumes. Many stories are also published as dōjinshi; Shotaket (ショタケット), (Note: Also given in English as Shotaketto, although it is officially romanized as Syotaket on the convention homepage.) an annual convention to sell shotacon dōjin material, was founded in 1995 by a group of male creators. The 2008 Shotaket had over 1,000 attendees and offered work from nearly 200 circles. Shotafes (ショタフェス), which was renamed to S-Fes (エスフェス) in 2026, and J-Ket (Jケット) are two major dōjinshi conventions featuring shota characters.

Shotacon for women is almost exclusively yaoi, and may be published in general yaoi anthology magazines or in one of the few exclusively shotacon yaoi anthologies, such as Shōnen Romance. Because of the possible legal issues, US publishers of yaoi have avoided material depicting notably underage characters. In 2006, Juné released an English translation of Mako Takahashi's Naichaisouyo (泣いちゃいそうよ) under the title "Almost Crying", a non-erotic shotacon manga; the book contains several stories featuring pubescent male characters, but their relationships are nonsexual.

Shota stories may be published in (a subset of) general seijin (men's pornographic) manga anthologies or in the few seijin shota manga anthologies, such as Shōnen Ai no Bigaku, which specializes in male-male stories. Some gay men's magazines which offer a particularly broad mix of pornographic material occasionally run stories or manga featuring peripubescent characters.

In 2006, the seijin shotacon OVA anime Boku no Pico (ぼくのぴこ; lit. 'My Pico'), which the producer has described as the first shotacon anime, was released. It was later followed by two sequels and an edited version of the first OVA, with content more suitable for viewers under 18, as well as a video game starring Pico and Chico, the main characters of the anime. However, an OVA based on the eroge Enzai was created in 2004, featuring explicit sexual acts involving young boys, and the OVA for Akira Gotō's A Forbidden Time dates back to 2000.

== Legality ==
Many countries, such as the United Kingdom, Canada, Brazil, France, and Russia, include fictional content in their laws restricting pornographic content involving children. The exact specifications of these bans vary by jurisdiction. The Supreme Court of Canada ruled in the R. v. Sharpe case that "visual works of the imagination as well as depictions of actual people" fall under the category of child pornography.

== See also ==
- Cartoon pornography
- Junior idol – child or teenage entertainer in Japanese pop culture
- Nijikon – Sexual interest in 2D characters
- Simulated child pornography – produced without direct involvement of children
- Victimless crime – illegal acts which do not directly involve others
- Video game controversies
- Glossary of anime and manga – terms relating to Japanese subcultural media
