= The Brave of Sun Fighbird =

Japanese anime television series

- 太陽の勇者ファイバード
- Genre: Mecha science fiction action superhero
- Created by: Hajime Yatate
- Developed by: Yasushi Hirano
- Directed by: Katsuyoshi Yatabe
- Music by: Toshiyuki Watanabe
- Country of origin: Japan
- Original language: Japanese
- No. of episodes: 48

Production
- Producers: Shin Imai (Nagoya TV); Yōichi Honna (Tokyu Agency); Takayuki Yoshii (Sunrise)
- Production companies: Nagoya TV; Tokyu Agency; Sunrise

Original release
- Network: ANN (Nagoya TV, TV Asahi)
- Release: February 2, 1991 – February 1, 1992

The Brave of Sun Fighbird (太陽の勇者ファイバード, Taiyō no Yūsha Faibādo), also known as The Brave Fighter of Sun Fighbird on Japanese DVD releases, is a 1991 anime television series created by Takara and Sunrise under the direction of Katsuyoshi Yatabe and the second incarnation in the Brave series.

== Story ==
In 2010, the evil energy being Drias comes to Earth and allies with evil scientist Dr. Jango, with the Universe Security Force (宇宙警備隊, Uchū Keibitai (Note: Not to be confused with the similarly-named-in-Japanese Space Garrison of the Ultraman franchise)) pursuing him. In order to interact with Earth and disguise themselves, its members put their energy-formed spirits into either special android vehicles built by Japan's scientist Hiroshi Amano, which have transformable bodies and were intended to be rescue units, or service vehicles. Their commander, Fighbird, uses a human-shaped android created by Hiroshi and assumes the identity of his assistant Yutaro Katori, transforming into Fighbird when danger strikes. While fighting against Drias and Jango's forces, he lives with Hiroshi and his grandchildren, Kenta and Haruka, while adjusting to life on Earth.

== Characters ==
- Yutaro Katori / Fighbird (火鳥 勇太郎 / ファイバード, Katori Yūtarō / Faibādo)
  Yutaro Katori (voiced by Yasunori Matsumoto) is an artificial human whose form Fighbird takes after merging his soul with an android that Hiroshi created to handle his world peace machines, taking his human appearance from a drawing made by his granddaughter Haruka and posing as his assistant. He has artificial blood and skin made of super silicone foam that disappears when he transforms; while disguising himself as Katori, he channels some of his people's natural properties into Fire Jet, his true body disguised as a jet. Despite his lack of familiarity with Earth culture often causing issues, he is kind, protective of Earth and his loved ones, and skilled with technology. He later adopts the alternate identity of Granbird when Fighbird is unusable or not ideal for the situation, with him and Granbird fusing into Great Fighbird through the Strongest Combination.
- Hiroshi Amano (天野 博士, Amano Hiroshi)
  Hiroshi Amano (voiced by Ichirō Nagai) is the 65-year-old head of the Amano Peace Science Laboratory, which develops machines to achieve world peace. They always fail, but he learns his mistakes and often saves the day, especially after the vehicles he designed and built host the souls of some of Fighbird's Space Police teammates. He has financial problems with the land he lives on and is considered an eccentric by his neighbors and fellow scientists.
- Kenta Amano (天野 ケンタ, Amano Kenta)
  Kenta (voiced by Kazue Ikura) is Hiroshi's grandson and the first friend that Katori makes, who looks up to him as an older brother. Along with Katori, he is a special member of the Space Police Force, aiding him in battle and keeping him in touch with the Rescue base. He owns Wrister (リスター, Risutā), a wristwatch robot given to him by Katori.
- Haruka Amano (天野 ハルカ, Amano Haruka)
  Haruka Amano (voiced by Rie Iwatsubo) is Kenta's cousin and Hiroshi's granddaughter, who lives with him since her parents work abroad. She created the picture that inspired Katori's human appearance and has a precocious crush on him.
- Champ (チャンプ, Chanpu)
  Champ (voiced by Kazue Ikura) is Haruka's pet monkey, who was a gift from her parents.
- Yoshiko Kunieda (国枝美子, Kunieda Yoshiko)
  Yoshiko Kunieda (voiced by Masako Katsuki) doctor who works at a local hospital. She has doubted Katori's identity ever since he tried to donate his artificial blood and she noticed strange things in its sample, but was unable to fully analyze it due to him and Kenta taking it away. Over time, she learns about the Universe Security Team's mission and falls in love with Katori. Her ambulance hosts the soul of Guard Rescue.
- Inspector Satsuda (佐津田 刑事, Satsuda Keiji)
  Inspector Satsuda (voiced by Shigezō Sasaoka) is a detective of the Tokyo Metropolitan Police Department, who believes Hiroshi to be connected to a robbery that took place three years ago. While his tactics often backfire, he displays courage and willingness to help people when the situation calls for it. His police car hosts the soul of Guard Star.
- Momoko Yamazaki (山崎 もも子, Yamazaki Momoko)
  Momoko Yamazaki (voiced by Chie Kōjiro) is a news reporter who develops a crush on Fighbird after he saves her when her attempts to report on his battles put her in danger, but is unaware that he and Katori are the same person.
- Ippei & Goro (一平 & 五郎, Ippei & Goro)
  Ippei and Goro (respectively voiced by Daiki Nakamura and Kosuke Tomita) are thieves who planned to steal the crimson diamond from the Persian Treasure Exhibition, which fails due to an encounter with Yutaro and an attack by Drias. During the final battle, Drias enslaves them to build the Devil's Tower, but Katori saves them and they join the Amano Peace Science Laboratory's rescue team soon after.

== Universe Security Team ==
=== Fighbird ===
- Great Fighbird (グレートファイバード, Gurēto Faibādo):
  The Strongest Combination (最強合体, Saikyō Gattai) of Fighbird and Granbird.
  - Fighbird:
    The true identity of Katori when he reunites his life-force with his true body, disguised as Fire Jet. Fighbird also has an Armament Combination (武装合体, Busō Gattai) formed by combining with the body's auxiliary mecha, Flame Breaster.
    - Fire Jet (ファイアージェット, Faiā Jetto)
      One half of Fighbird's disguised form, with his body being disguised as Hiroshi's jet while his life-force inhabits Katori's body.
    - Flame Breaster (フレイムブレスター, Fureimu Buresutā)
      Fighbird's auxiliary mecha, which resembles a fighter jet and wields the Flame Cannon (フレイムキャノン, Fureimu Kyanon).
  - Granbird (グランバード, Guranbādo):
    An alternate identity that Fighbird takes on by using Fire Shuttle as a body when Fire Jet either has been damaged or is not ideal for the situation. Additionally, Granbird has a Jet Combination (ジェット合体, Jetto Gattai) with Breaster Jet.
    - Fire Shuttle (ファイアーシャトル, Faiā Shatoru)
      Granbird's disguised form, which is based on the NASA space shuttle.
    - Breaster Jet (ブレスタージェット, Buresutā Jetto)
      Granbird's auxiliary mecha, which wields the Gran Rocketer (グランロケーター, Guran Rokētā).

=== Guard Team (ガードチーム, Gādo Chiimu) ===
A team whose disguised forms represent Earth's three public civil service occupations—police for Guard Star, firefighting for Guard Fire, and medical for Guard Rescue—with Guard Wing joining later on.

- Super Guardion (スーパーガーディオン, Sūpā Gādion): (voiced by Kōji Totani)
  The Four-Body Combination (四体合体, Yon-Tai Gattai) of Guard Star, Guard Fire, Guard Rescue and Guard Wing, with Guard Wing's power providing an enhanced form and flight abilities.
  - Guardion (ガーディオン, Gādion): (Voiced by Naoki Bandō)
    The Three-Body Combination (三体合体, San-Tai Gattai) of Guard Star, Fire, and Rescue.
    - Guard Star (ガードスター, Gādo Sutā): (Voiced by Naoki Bandō)
      Leader of the Guard Team, who disguises himself as Inspector Satsuda;s police car and forms the head, chest, and back of Guardion.
    - Guard Fire (ガードファイアー, Gādo Faiā): (Voiced by Naoki Makishima)
      He disguises himself as a fire truck and forms the arms and under-torso of Guardion.
    - Guard Rescue (ガードレスキュー, Gādo Resukyu): (Voiced by Kōji Tsujitani)
      He disguises himself as the ambulance belonging to Dr. Kunieda's workplace and forms the legs of Guardion.
  - Guard Wing (ガードウィング, Gādo Uingu): (Voiced by Kōji Totani)
    The fourth member of the Guard Team, who disguises himself as a twin-gyro plane and forms the feet of Guardion.

=== Baron Team (バロンチーム, Baron Chiimu) ===
A five-member team whose vehicular disguises can assemble a special team transportation formation known as Thunder Jet (サンダージェット, Sandā Jetto).

- Thunder Baron (サンダーバロン, Sandā Baron): (Voiced by Kōzō Shioya)
  The Five-Body Combination (五体合体, Go-Tai Gattai) of the Baron Team. Furthermore, each member is "numbered" with a number that appears somewhere on their bodies.
  - Ace Baron (エースバロン, Ēsu Baron): (Voiced by Kōzō Shioya)
    The leader of the Baron Team, who disguises himself as a tank and forms the torso, head and upper legs of Thunder Baron, with his firing weapons serving as forearm-mounted firearms.
  - Road Baron (ロードバロン, Roodo Baron)
    Disguises as a trailer and forms the right arm of Thunder Baron.
  - Drill Baron (ドリルバロン, Doriru Baron)
    Disguises as a drill tank and forms the left arm of Thunder Baron.
  - Aqua Baron (アクアバロン, Akua Baron)
    Disguises as a submarine and forms the right leg of Thunder Baron.
  - Sky Baron (スカイバロン, Sukai Baron)
    Disguises as a small jet and forms the left leg of Thunder Baron.

=== Gatherway Blaster (ギャザーウェイブラスター, Gyazāuei Burasutā) ===
A special team attack formation formed when Thunder Baron switches into Thunder Jet and links up with Super Guardion and Great Fighbird.

== Antagonists ==
- Drias

Drias (ドライアス, Doraiasu) (voiced by Daisuke Gori), also known as the "Universe Emperor" (宇宙皇帝, Uchū Kōtei), is the main antagonist of the series, who allies with Dr. Jango and aims to plunge Earth into darkness. He possesses two forms:

  - Death Team (デスチーム, Desu Chīmu)
    Drias' three alternate identities, who form the Three-Beast Combination (三獣合体, San-Jū Gattai).
    - Death Eagle (デスイーグル, Desu Iiguru)
      The head, chest, back and wings, shin guards, and feet.
    - Death Tiger (デスタイガー, Desu Taigaa)
      The right torso half, arm, and leg, which provides the back-mounted Death Cannons (デスキャノン, Desu Kyanon).
    - Death Dragon (デスドラゴン, Desu Doragon)
      The left torso half, arm and leg with the wings becoming a Death Shield (デスシールド, Desu Shīrudo) that acts efficiently as the sheath for Drias' Death Blade (デスブレード, Desu Burēdo)
  - Drias Jet (ドライアスジェット, Doraiasu Jetto)
    A vehicle form for transportation.

In the final battle, Drias assumes the "organic"-themed transformation Organic Drias (オーガニックドライアス, Ooganikku Doraiasu) after bathing himself in the negative energy from deep space using the Devil Tower.

- Doctor Jango (Dr.ジャンゴ, Dokutaa Jango)
  Doctor Jango (voiced by Junpei Takiguchi) is a mad scientist who is Hiroshi's biggest rival and Drias' ally. He operates from an undersea base while having Zol and Shura work for him and secretly planning to overthrow Drias.
- Zol (ゾル, Zoru) and Shura (シュラ, Shura)
  Zol and Shura (respectively voiced by Kiyoyuki Yanada and Yuu Shimaka) are Drias' subordinates, who command the Teshita (テシター, Teshitaa), humanoid robots, and the Mecha Beasts, mechanical monsters built by Jango and powered by Drias' minus energy.

=== Mecha Beasts ===
Mecha Beasts serve as the series' monsters of the week.

- Sand Tremor: Appears in episode 1. Powers include burrowing, launchable centipede legs on cables and a mouth flamethrower. Reappears in the Famicom adaption game without its legs being launchable and under the name Sand Pedron.
- Frabirah: Appears in episode 2. Powers include swimming, giant lobster claws armed with purple beams, separating its body's manta-ray-like section named Shigurabu (this leads to 2 different duties being performed simultaneously) armed with red beams from the wings and abdomen missiles.
- Benmabent: Appears in episode 3. Powers include emitting CFCs absorbed from its tentacles, treads and purple mouth acid.
- Mantisor: Appears in episode 4. Powers include flight and dual shoulder energy cannons.
- Sukeagan: Appears in episode 4. Its only known power is a large extendable drill for the right arm.
- Gurobil: Appears in episode 5. Powers include swimming, strong jaws, coiling, resisting underwater pressure as deep as 7300 meters, mouth torpedoes and a pink energy cannon on each head side.
- Go Top: Appears in episode 6: Powers include emitting strong winds and red lasers from its top-like body, levitation and three wired grappling hooks.
- Sutangia: Appears in episode 7: Powers include leg treads, a red laser from the head strong enough to obliterate mountains and yellow lasers from both the right hand pincer claw and torso.
- Dabias: Appears in episode 8. Powers include a saucer mode armed with three purple lasers from the underside, flight, explosive yellow lasers from the head, bladed claw hands and energy resistance.
- Barbus: Appears in episode 9. Powers include flight, mouth-spewed pink "GP Liquid" acid, an underside tractor beam, a tail laser and a machine gun in each wing. Dr. Jango calls it the "Mechadragonfly" in the episode shortly after its destruction. Reappears in the Famicom adaption game with only its GP Liquid spewing ability and under the name Dragon.
- Vice Kid: Appears in episode 10. Powers include burrowing, a red laser cannon from the head, three lesser red laser cannons on the underside and high jumping.
- Bekusa: Appears in episode 11. Powers include burrowing, toxic spores from the back, using the launchable spikes on its back for emitting electric bolts, giving it long-range teleportation in a blinding light, and firing electric balls, a pair of green laser cannons on the neck's back and a mouth flamethrower.
- Beinbul: Appears in episode 12. Powers include swimming, emitting red tide algae and white acid from the mouth and pincer claw hands on its four arms. Reappears in the Famicom adaption game with different powers and under the name Shired-Tide
- Parasite: Appears in episode 13. Powers include disguising itself as a Mayan temple, eighteen yellow energy cannons, and purple glue from the mouth.
- Dorauta: Appears in episode 14. Powers include a turbine for spawning tornadoes and levitating, burrowing, retractable limbs, a green laser cannon on each shoulder and a head-equipped flamethrower.
- Destroid: Appears in episode 15. Powers include swimming, a global magnetic field, pincer claws tentacles armed with red lasers, six homing torpedo launchers, and a red energy beam from the underside.
- Growler: Appears in episode 16. Powers include swimming and a jackhammer for each arm armed with a launchable spear.
- Skull Bites: Appears in episode 17. Powers include four mouth guns and meat hook arms.
- Mouru Toad: Appears in episode 18. Powers include burrowing, emitting structure acid from the holes on its body, energy cutters from the pupils, a long sticky tongue armed, yellow mouth lasers, high jumping and finger spikes.
- Diabolada: Appears in episode 19. Powers include flight and tooth missiles.
- Insulabor: Appears in episode 21. Powers include flight, green lasers from the mouth, an energy cannon for the upper left arm and a pair of extendable tentacles for the lower arms.
- Flygan: Appears in episode 21. Powers include lasers beams from its gun-like mouth and capture rings.
- Terra Grant: Appears in episode 22. Powers include disguising itself as a cargo plane, six grapple arms, a 36-tube bomb launcher on each side of its body, a 28-tube bomb launcher in the front center of its body, a 12-tube bomb launcher along the top of its front, a 7-tube bomb launcher on each upper corner, levitation, and a red large bladed claw.
- Goljira: Appears in episode 23. Powers include flight, burrowing and mouth suction.
- Decashita: Appears in episode 23. Powers include division into construction robots with a pair of lanterns and flight.
- Irushida: Appears in episode 24. Powers include the growth of devil flowers around it, flight, six extendable electric tentacles, an explosive pink laser from each of its six peddles, a saucer mode, and a fan in the center of its body.
- Inamasu: Appears in episode 25. Powers include burrowing, blue energy balls from its elephant trunk, a pair of elephant tusks for goring and firing red energy balls, and flight.
- Dazzler: Appears in episode 26. Powers include flight, pectoral tractor beams, red claw beams, and devil stone energy from the forehead.
- Drotasu: Appears in episode 28. Powers include creating cold weather by redirecting snow, burrowing, reflective ice armor, green eye bolts, an ice cannon on the back, a circular saw in each shoulder, freezing breath, and flight by head and limb retraction to execute a spin attack. Dr. Jango refers to snow re-director as the Super Freezer.
- Griper: Appears in episode 29. Powers include flight, launchable fists on cables that emit red electricity, and a railgun on each shoulder.
- Sabeja: Appears in episode 30. Powers include a rhino horn and a 7-tube missile pod on each front hip.
- Giros: Appears in episode 31. Powers include flight, tank treads, a large drill, and a machine gun in each eye.
- Mass Jiva: Appears in episode 32. Powers include flight, large claws, electric bolts from the bridge, a pair of 9-tube missile launchers in the bow, and three energy cannons on the bridge.
- Hercas: Appears in episode 33. Powers include flight, a mouth tractor beam, and a club.
- Fly Doll: Appears in episode 34. Powers include capture bubbles, a vacuum in the abdomen, a pair of machine guns on the rear end, mouth flames, a bow stored in the back armed with explosive cluster arrows, flight, and waist machine guns.
- Pipokibu: Appears in episode 35. Powers include flight, four energy cannon legs, a pair of missile pods in the back, and a pink suction beam from the mouth.
- Stain Bat: Appears in episode 36. Powers include flight, mouth sonic waves, fangs, and a machine gun on each wing.
- Anomeras: Appears in episode 37. Powers include swimming, electric squid tentacles, and three machine guns on each side of its nautilus shell.
- Minus Energized Gorilla: Appears in episode 38. Powers include swimming and strength. It is a regular gorilla mutated with Drias' minus energy.
- Impairer: Appears in episode 39. Powers include an ultrasonic hypnosis eye that causes muscle stiffness, burrowing, treads, claw arms, four green laser guns in each side of the head, a high-strength coating gun on its top, and a pair of double-barreled green laser turrets on each side of the coating gun.
- Toransanto: Appears in episode 40. Powers include dividing into three robots, three pink energy cannons, and foot wheels.
- Plainmanto: Appears in episode 41. Powers include flight, projectile-resistant bladed mantis arms, mouth missiles, extendable knee blades, red eye beams, and a pair of blades from the back.
- Jinmen: Appears in episode 42. Powers include burrowing, a pair of scythe-like claw arms, a pair of electric restraining tentacles in the face, and a pink laser cannon on each shoulder.
- Garbaji: Appears in episode 43. Powers include green explosive lasers from the fingers, shoulder cannons that fire capsules of poisonous gas composed of chlorine and carbon monoxide, fan blades in the waist, and heat-resistant hands.
- Epidemia: Appears in episode 44. Powers include a blimp disguise, emitting a biological contagion that resembles black snow, flight, bladed boomerang antlers, a drill arm, a chainsaw arm, and an electric capture gun.
- Medosoid: Appears in episode 45. Powers include swimming, eight extendable octopus tentacles, and purple energy beams from the underside.
- Sodom and Gomorrah Combination: A fusion of Sodom and Gomorrah, who appears in episode 48. Powers include flight and strength.

== Video games ==
A vertical rail shooter based on the series was released on the Game Boy on December 20, 1991, with a Famicom version released the next month on January 11, 1992.

Fighbird also appears in the Brave Saga and Harobots games.

== Internet meme ==
In 2011, a scene from the third episode in which Katori sees a butterfly while speaking to Inspector Satsuda and asks "is this a pigeon?" was uploaded to Tumblr, spawning many variations and becoming a popular meme that had a resurgence in 2018.

== Episodes ==
No.	Title	Directed by	Written by	Original release date
1	"The Miracle Hero Appears" "Kiseki no Yūsha (Mirakuru Hīrō) Tōjō" (奇跡の勇者(ミラクルヒーロー)登場!)	Directed by : Akihiko Nishiyama; Storyboarded by : Futa Morita	Yasushi Hirano	February 2, 1991
2	"2 Seconds Before the Summit Explodes" "Samitto Bakuha 2-byo Mae" (サミット爆破2秒前)	Hideaki Oba	Yasushi Hirano	February 9, 1991
3	"The Complete Space Guard" "Seizoroi Uchū Keibitai" (勢ぞろい宇宙警備隊)	Shinji Takamatsu	Yasushi Hirano	February 16, 1991
4	"The Terrifying Blood Virus" "Kyōfu no Ketsueki Uirisu" (恐怖の血液ウイルス)	Directed by : Kiyotaka Ohata; Storyboarded by : Hiroshi Ishiodori	Hiroyuki Hoshiyama	February 23, 1991
5	"SOS! 3,000 Meters Deep" "SOS! Shinkai 3-sen M (Mētoru)" (SOS! 深海3千M(メートル))	Akihiko Nishiyama	Yasushi Hirano; Fumihiko Shimo	March 2, 1991
6	"Bullet Train Collision!" "Gekitotsu! Dangan Ressha" (激突! 弾丸列車)	Hideaki Oba	Yasushi Hirano	March 9, 1991
7	"Yutaro and the Jewel Thief" "Yūtarō to Hōseki Dorobō" (勇太郎と宝石泥棒)	Masamitsu Hidaka	Yasushi Hirano; Fumihiko Shimo	March 16, 1991
8	"Evil's Pursuit" "Akuma no Tsuiseki" (悪魔の追跡)	Shinji Takamatsu	Yasushi Hirano	March 23, 1991
9	"I am Dr. Jango!" "Washi ga Dr.(Dokutā) Jango da!" (わしがDr.(ドクター)ジャンゴだ!)	Hiroshi Ishiodori	Hiroyuki Hoshiyama	March 30, 1991
10	"50,000 Hostages" "5 Man-ri no Hitojichi" (5万人の人質)	Hideaki Oba	Yasushi Hirano; Fumihiko Shimo	April 6, 1991
11	"Flowers, Revive!" "Hana yo Yomigaere" (花よ よみがえれ)	Akihiko Nishiyama	Yasushi Hirano; Atsuhiro Tomioka	April 13, 1991
12	"Terror of the Red Sea" "Akai Umi no Kyōfu" (赤い海の恐怖)	Masamitsu Hidaka	Yasushi Hirano	April 20, 1991
13	"Three Scientists" "San'nin no Kagaku-sha" (三人の科学者)	Directed by : Shinji Takamatsu; Storyboarded by : Futa Morita	Yasushi Hirano; Atsuhiro Tomioka	April 27, 1991
14	"Burn, Guard Fire!" "Moeyo G(Gādo) Faiā" (燃えよ G(ガード)ファイアー)	Hiroshi Ishiodori	Yasushi Hirano; Fumihiko Shimo	May 4, 1991
15	"A Call to a First Love" "Hatsukoi Denwa o Tsunage" (初恋電話をつなげ)	Hideaki Oba	Yasushi Hirano	May 11, 1991
16	"Dr. Jango's Great Earthquake" "Dr.(Dokutā) Jango no Daijishin" (Dr.(ドクター)ジャンゴの大地震)	Directed by : Kiyotaka Ohata; Storyboarded by : Kazuhito Kikuchi	Hiroyuki Hoshiyama	May 25, 1991
17	"Crazy Computer City" "Kurutta Konpyūta Toshi" (狂ったコンピュータ都市)	Masamitsu Hidaka	Yasushi Hirano; Atsuhiro Tomioka	June 1, 1991
18	"The Mystery of the Lost City" "Kieta Machi no Nazo" (消えた街の謎)	Shinji Takamatsu	Yasushi Hirano; Atsuhiro Tomioka	June 8, 1991
19	"The Legendary Hidden Treasure" "Densetsu no Hihō" (伝説の秘宝)	Akihiko Nishiyama	Yasushi Hirano; Fumihiko Shimo	June 15, 1991
20	"Declaration of American Invasion" "Amerika Seifuku Sengen" (アメリカ征服宣言)	Directed by : Hideaki Oba; Storyboarded by : Futa Morita	Yasushi Hirano	June 22, 1991
21	"Take Back America!" "Amerika o Dakkan Seyo!" (アメリカを奪還せよ!)	Directed by : Kojin Ochi; Storyboarded by : Hiroshi Ishiodori	Yasushi Hirano; Atsuhiro Tomioka	June 29, 1991
22	"Guard Wing in Danger" "G(Gādo) Uingu Kikiippatsu" (G(ガード)ウイング危機一髪)	Directed by : Masamitsu Hidaka; Storyboarded by : Kunihisa Sugishima	Yasushi Hirano; Fumihiko Shimo	July 6, 1991
23	"Introducing! Super Guardion" "Tōjō! S(Sūpā) Gādion" (登場! S(スーパー)ガーディオン)	Directed by : Kiyotaka Ohata; Storyboarded by : Kazuhito Kikuchi	Mami Watanabe	July 13, 1991
24	"The Terrifying Space Plants" "Osorubeki Uchū Shokubatsu" (恐るべき 宇宙植物)	Shinji Takamatsu	Hiroyuki Hoshiyama	July 20, 1991
25	"Prince Fighbird" "Purinsu Faibādo" (プリンス ファイバード)	Kunihisa Sugishima	Yasushi Hirano; Fumihiko Shimo	July 27, 1991
26	"Mystery of the Devil Stone" "Debirusutōn no Nazo" (デビルストーンの謎)	Directed by : Akihiko Nishiyama; Storyboarded by : Akihiko Nishiyama, Futa Morita	Mami Watanabe	August 3, 1991
27	"Devil's Melody" "Akuma no Ongaku (Merodī)" (悪魔の音楽(メロディー))	Directed by : Akihiko Nishiyama; Storyboarded by : Futa Morita	Yasushi Hirano	August 10, 1991
28	"A Frozen Summer" "Kōritsuita Natsu" (凍りついた夏)	Directed by : Kojin Ochi; Storyboarded by : Kunihisa Sugishima	Yasushi Hirano; Yasutaka Ito	August 17, 1991
29	"Scattered Piggy Banks in the Sky" "Sora ni Chitta Chokin-Bako" (空に散った貯金箱)	Hiroshi Ishiodori	Keiko Maruo	August 24, 1991
30	"The Space Station is Under Attack" "Nerawa Reta Uchū Kichi" (狙われた 宇宙基地)	Hideaki Oba	Yasushi Hirano; Fumihiko Shimo	August 31, 1991
31	"Ace Baron and the Lying Girl" "Ēsu Baron to Usotsuki Shōjo" (エースバロンと嘘つき少女)	Kiyotaka Ohata	Hiroyuki Hoshiyama	September 7, 1991
32	"Here it is! The Strongest Fusion" "Deta! Saikyō Gattai" (出た! 最強合体)	Shinji Takamatsu	Yasushi Hirano; Atsuhiro Tomioka	September 14, 1991
33	"Messages from the Past" "Kako kara no Messēji" (過去からのメッセージ)	Directed by : Kojin Ochi; Storyboarded by : Kazuhito Kikuchi	Yasushi Hirano; Fumihiko Shimo	September 21, 1991
34	"Baby Rescue Mission" "Akachan Kyūshutsu Sakusen" (赤ちゃん救出作戦)	Directed by : Akihiko Nishiyama; Storyboarded by : Kunihisa Sugishima	Mami Watanabe	September 28, 1991
35	"The Scientists' Challenge" "Kagaku-sha-tachi no Chōsen" (科学者たちの挑戦)	Hideaki Oba	Yasushi Hirano; Atsuhiro Tomioka	October 5, 1991
36	"Vampire Town" "Kyūketsu no Machi" (吸血の街)	Masamitsu Hidaka	Yasushi Hirano; Fumihiko Shimo	October 12, 1991
37	"The Secret of the Ghost Ship" "Yūreisen no Himitsu" (幽霊船の秘密)	Directed by : Kiyotaka Ohata; Storyboarded by : Kazuhito Kikuchi	Yasushi Hirano	October 19, 1991
38	"Champ and the Giant Gorilla" "Chanpu to Kyodai Gorira" (チャンプと巨大ゴリラ)	Shinji Takamatsu	Yasushi Hirano	October 26, 1991
39	"Yutaro's Class Visit" "Yūtarō no Jugyō Sankan" (勇太郎の授業参観)	Directed by : Kojin Ochi; Storyboarded by : Hiroshi Ishiodori	Yasushi Hirano; Toshiyasu Nagata	November 16, 1991
40	"Clash! Mom vs Hidori" "Gekitotsu! Mama Tai Hidori" (激突! ママ対火鳥)	Directed by : Hideaki Oba; Storyboarded by : Futa Morita	Yasushi Hirano; Fumihiko Shimo	November 23, 1991
41	"Great Fight! Inspector Satsuda" "Dai Funsen! Tasuku Tsuda Keiji" (大奮戦! 佐津田刑事)	Masamitsu Hidaka	Yasushi Hirano; Kaoru Kasai	November 30, 1991
42	"Yutaro Becomes a Dad" "Papa ni Natta Yūtarō" (パパになった勇太郎)	Directed by : Akihiko Nishiyama; Storyboarded by : Kazuhito Kikuchi	Mami Watanabe	December 7, 1991
43	"Our Mission" "Oretachi no Shimei" (俺たちの使命)	Kazuhito Kikuchi	Yasushi Hirano; Atsuhiro Tomioka	December 14, 1991
44	"Black Christmas" "Burakku Kurisumasu" (ブラッククリスマス)	Directed by : Shinji Takamatsu; Storyboarded by : Kunihisa Sugishima	Yasushi Hirano; Fumihiko Shimo	December 21, 1991
45	"The Undersea Base Surfaces" "Kaitei Kichi Fujō" (海底基地浮上)	Hideaki Oba	Yasushi Hirano; Atsuhiro Tomioka	December 28, 1991
46	"Rise! Devil's Tower" "Shutsugen! Debiru no Tō" (出現! デビルの塔)	Directed by : Kojin Ochi; Storyboarded by : Kazuhito Kikuchi	Yasushi Hirano	January 18, 1992
47	"Decisive Battle! Guianan Highlands" "Kessen! Giana Kōchi" (決戦! ギアナ高地)	Directed by : Akihiko Nishiyama; Storyboarded by : Masamitsu Hidaka	Yasushi Hirano	January 25, 1992
48	"Farewell Space Guard" "Saraba Uchū Kebitai" (さらば 宇宙警備隊)	Masamitsu Hidaka	Yasushi Hirano	February 1, 1992

Preceded by Brave Exkaiser	Brave series 1991-1992	Succeeded by The Brave Fighter of Legend Da-Garn
