= Yubisaki Milk Tea =

Japanese manga series

- First tankōbon volume cover, featuring Hidari Morii

ゆびさきミルクティー (Yubisaki Miruku Tī)
- Genre: Romantic comedy
- Manga
- Written by: Tomochika Miyano
- Published by: Hakusensha
- English publisher: NA: Tokyopop
- Magazine: Young Animal
- Original run: December 27, 2002 – March 12, 2010
- Volumes: 10
- icon

Yubisaki Milk Tea (Japanese: ゆびさきミルクティー, Hepburn: Yubisaki Miruku Tī; lit. "Fingertip Milk Tea") is a Japanese manga by Tomochika Miyano. It was serialized in Hakusensha's seinen manga magazine Young Animal between December 2002 and March 2010, with its chapters collected in 10 tankōbon volumes. The series focuses on a boy whose hobby is cross-dressing and the lives of those around him whom he affects whether he is dressed up or not. The manga was licensed in North America by Tokyopop.

== Plot ==
Yubisaki Milk Tea revolves around Yoshinori Ikeda, a high school student, who is one day convinced to fill in for his sister for a modeling job while she went on a date. He cross-dresses in his first female outfit as a bride, before ultimately discovering that he enjoys dressing like a girl. He has a young childhood friend named Hidari Morii that he is interested in, but he is unsure of his feelings, as there is another girl he likes in his own class—Minamo Kurokawa. Incidentally, Minamo is the class head, and top student, but she has trouble opening up to people, especially men, due to an incident in her past. Yoshinori remedies this by dressing up, when he is able to become Yuki—the name he chose for himself in feminine form. As the story goes on, Yoshinori is still unable to choose which of the two girls he likes more and all the while feelings of love between everyone are growing ever stronger.

== Characters ==
Yoshinori "Yuki" Ikeda (池田 由紀 (ユキ), Ikeda Yoshinori (Yuki))
Voiced by: Mitsuki Saiga
Yoshinori is the main protagonist of the story who one day has to fill in for his sister for a modeling job and finds that he enjoys cross-dressing. Eventually, he develops the interesting hobby of dressing up as a girl and taking pictures of himself to later view. He chose the name "Yuki" as his name while dressed as a girl impulsively when Hidari asked this girl her name. The name 'Yuki' can be written with the same kanji as Yoshinori but is written in katakana to denote the difference in the manga. Yoshinori often worries that people will find out who he really is when dressed up due to the similarity. Most of the time, this duality in his life causes a lot of internal conflict within him and he finds himself changing his life to make it more suitable for himself to keep cross-dressing as long as possible. This includes quitting soccer in high school so as to not scrape his knees or even not working out in order to keep his slender upper arms.
His cross-dressing habit is endangered twice: once when he finds out he had grown taller since he entered high school, and once when he thought that his love for cross-dressing had a higher priority than his love for Minamo. Both times, though, Minamo stopped him from quitting: the first time, she blackmailed him into resuming his cross-dressing (threatening to tell the whole school if he did not), and the second time, Minamo forgave him for asking her to wear his Yuki wig.
Hidari Morii (森居 左, Morii Hidari)
Voiced by: Mamiko Noto
Hidari is Yoshinori's childhood friend and next-door neighbor who grew up with Yoshinori since a young age. She is two years younger than Yoshinori and attends a junior high school. She has a crush on him and wants to grow up in order to be closer to him. Despite this, Yoshinori still sees her as a child and does not want to bring himself to make a move on his close friend even though he too has feelings for her. She has known that Yuki is Yoshinori since Yoshinori confessed it. Hidari is very ambitious and athletic which often causes her to get cuts and scrapes from time to time. Also, she tends to look up to Yoshinori's older sister, Miki.
Minamo Kurokawa (黒川 水面, Kurokawa Minamo)
Voiced by: Yukari Tamura
Minamo is one of Yoshinori's classmates who usually has an antisocial tendency towards other people so in effect does not open up much to others. Despite this, guys still are sensually attracted to her and she has even been asked out, though she turned the guy down. She had one point had an incestuous attraction to her brother which was mutual, but never delved further into. She knows that she is weird, difficult, and objects to being treated like an object. That is why she likes Yoshinori - he has never treated her like an object. She is a very intelligent girl and was hired by Hidari's father to tutor Hidari in the afternoon. She thinks Hidari is very intelligent and asks Yoshinori not to take Hidari from her.
Minamo finds out about Yoshinori's secret one day when he decides to dress as Yuki at school as a ploy to get her to open up more. Unfortunately for Yoshinori, she sees right through him from the start and subsequently teases him about it, calling him "Catherine". She is emotionally torn by her relationship with Yoshinori and to a certain extent has become emotionally needful of him.
Wataru Takatsuki (高槻 亘, Takatsuki Wataru)
Wataru is Yoshinori's best friend that he has known since junior high school. Both of them were on the soccer team in those days and they even worked out special plays that only they knew about. Later in high school, he takes notice of "Yuki" but is unaware that "she" is in fact Yoshinori. He asks Yoshinori himself what he should do about it. Eventually, Wataru asks Minamo to arrange a meeting with Yuki, which Minamo ultimately agrees to in spite of her better judgement. As it is, Wataru really likes Yuki and desires to go out with "her" on a date. Wataru eventyally starts to notice Yoshinori's girly qualities and sees the similarities in Yuki and Yoshinori.
He does eventually discover Yuki's true identity when Wataru goes on a date with Yuki and is injured while protecting him from getting stabbed by a group of teenagers harassing them. He is unable to play in a match that is very important to him. Yoshinori who is regretful of that taking away Wataru's chance at winning the match, reveals that he is actually Yuki. Even though Wataru finds out that Yoshinori is Yuki, he still has feelings for Yuki. Yoshinori dresses up as Yuki for Wataru out of guilt.
Sumika Kagami (加賀見 栖, Kagami Sumika)
Sumika is a girl in Hidari's class who hangs around with Hidari as much as she can help it. On multiple occasions she shows attraction towards Hidari, even going as far as to openly confess her love. Also, she was in a sexually abusive relationship until half-way through the story; see below at Hiroaki Kagami. Sumika has a "cute" personality and usually goes for what she wants with much passion.
Miki Ikeda (池田 未記, Ikeda Miki)
Voiced by: Kyouko Hikami
Miki is Yoshinori's older sister who lives alone with her brother. She cares about Yoshinori very much and even after discovering his secret she attempts to comfort him and tell him that if there is anything ever bothering him, he can come to her. She has a mature attitude in life and does not pass up the opportunity to go out and have fun with her boyfriend. Some of the Ikeda family's unhappy background is shown, which is contrasted with the loving relationship in the Morii family that moved next door several years ago. This contrast rouses in Miki a desire to get closer to Yusuke Morii and his family. On a few occasions in the manga, Miki has also demonstrated an incestuous attraction to Yoshinori, going so far as tricking him into kissing her. Yoshinori merely dismisses this as his sister's reaction to having so many relationships with her boyfriends ending badly. Later on, she has a relationship with Yusuke Morii, Hidari's father, but keeps it a secret from Hidari.
Kunihiko Koyama (小山 邦彦, Koyama Kunihiko)
He is Yoshinori's boss who owns Koyama Photography where Yoshinori works. He often kids Yoshinori about his crossdressing hobby though is honest when it comes to the value of Yoshinori's pictures of himself as he is dressed as Yuki. Also, he thinks Hidari is a nice girl.
Tokou Nogi (乃木 東子, Nogi Tōko)
Tōko is an all-around athletic girl. She is the freshman star of the girls' basketball team. She finds out Yoshinori's secret when she plays one-on-one basketball against him while he is Yuki. She becomes the second good friend to Minamo Kurokawa. She is shown to be childhood friends with Kodama which left unresolved mutual attraction after Kodama rejected her advances.
Yori Hotta (堀田 依, Hotta Yori)
A girl in Hidari's junior high school. She starts a soccer team at the school and builds it around Hidari, working the team members, particularly Hidari, hard to be competitive. Yoshinori spoke once against Hidari playing on this team, because he did not want to see her get scraped and bruised, but it becomes Hidari's goal to measure up and succeed on this team.
Yusuke Morii (森居 佑介; Morii Yūsuke)
Hidari's father. Fairly young and level-headed. Has raised Hidari by himself since her mother, Sachi, died. Miki Ikeda tries to develop a relationship with him and eventually succeeds, though they keep this relationship a secret from Hidari. Hidari strongly reminds Yusuke of his wife.
Akemi
A makeup artist who knows Yoshinori and Koyama through work. She also kids Yoshinori about his crossdressing, though not in a demeaning manner. She also likes younger guys.
Sachi Morii (森居 左智; Morii Sachi)
Hidari's mother, Yoshinori's first one-sided love, died 7 years ago. Both Yoshinori and Miki admire her and miss her so much.
Hiroaki Kagami (加賀見)
Kagami works for a photography magazine and is a friend of Koyama. In the anime he is an uncle of Sumika, who he once had an incestuous relationship with. When Kagami sees the photos that were taken by Yoshinori, he recognizes Nori's talent. Koyama is unwilling to let Kagami have Nori's photos because of Kagami's "sketchy" character.
Rieko Shiba (芝 りえ子, Shiba Rieko)
A girl in Yoshinori's school. She is known as an idol around the school due to her attractive appearance and her acting skills in plays. It is said that the guys she smiles at will eventually confess to her in a week, but she turns them down the moment they do. She is shown to have a crush on Yoshinori because on the day of their high school entrance exams a couple of years ago, he comforted her nervousness with a drink, allowing to calm down and pass the entrance exam. Yoshinori however just want to see her as a friend. She has shown dislike towards Mimamo.
Nobuko Chiguya
The manager of Wataru Takatsuki's soccer team. She has feelings for Wataru, but he ignores them, preferring someone more mature like Yuki. When she sees Yoshinori as Yuki talking to Wataru, she goes out of her way to try to meddle in their relationship. She is overall a nice girl. Yoshinori encourages her to confess to Wataru in hopes of Wataru getting rid of his feelings for Yuki. She even gives Wataru a present, but he mistakenly thinks the present is from Yuki instead.
Hitomi/Chika Kodoma
A classmate of Yoshinori. He is an artist and has won a lot of awards for his paintings to the point where he could be considered a genius. Yoshinori feels like he can relate to him because when Nori became acquainted with Kodama he was in an artist block, similar to what Yoshinori was feeling when he started to grow taller in highschool. Yoshinori pulls Kodama out of his artist's block when he, as Yuki, models for him in a painting. Kodoma figured out the Yuki is actually Yoshinori from the shape of his collar bone. He eventually becomes Yoshinori's friend later on. He is a childhood friend of Nogi which had potential to turn into more though eventually dismissed her advances.

== Media ==
=== Manga ===
Written and illustrated by Tomochika Miyano, Yubisaki Milk Tea was serialized in Hakusensha's seinen manga magazine Young Animal from December 27, 2002, to March 12, 2010. Hakusensha collected its chapters in ten tankōbon volumes, released from July 29, 2003, to July 29, 2010.

In North America, the series was licensed by Tokyopop. Eight volumes were released from April 11, 2006, to April 1, 2010, (Note: The eighth North American volume combined the eighth and ninth Japanese volumes.) before Tokyopop closed down its North American publishing division in April 2011.

=== Drama CD ===
A drama CD based on the manga was first released in Japan on July 23, 2004. The CD contained fourteen tracks with four characters: Yoshinori, Hidari, Minamo, and Miki.

== Reception ==
Eduardo Chavez of Mania found the first volume to have a "sweet and titilating story." Erin Finnegan found the first and second volumes were "actually perverted." Gia Manry of Anime Vice noted that the story, "in honesty doesn't deliver as much as it could," concluding that "the result is in large part an angsty love-triangle soap opera." However, she adds that "it's still a bit more creative than your average love-triangle manga." Carlo Santos found the "underage fanservice" "creepy", and felt the art "lack[ed] craftsmanship".
