= The Brave of Gold Goldran =

Japanese anime television series

- 黄金勇者ゴルドラン
- Genre: Adventure, Comedy, Mecha
- Created by: Hajime Yatate
- Developed by: Hiroyuki Kawasaki
- Directed by: Shinji Takamatsu
- Music by: Hayato Matsuo
- Country of origin: Japan
- Original language: Japanese
- No. of episodes: 48

Production
- Producers: Hitoshi Kako (Nagoya TV); Asami Ohara (Tokyu Agency); Koji Takamori (Sunrise)
- Production companies: Nagoya TV; Tokyu Agency; Sunrise

Original release
- Network: ANN (Nagoya TV, TV Asahi)
- Release: February 4, 1995 – January 27, 1996

The Brave of Gold Goldran (黄金勇者ゴルドラン, Ōgon Yūsha Gorudoran) is a Japanese anime television series begun in 1995, created by Sunrise under the direction of Shinji Takamatsu, and was the sixth in the Yūsha/Brave metaseries. Goldran follows the adventures of three young boys who are tasked with finding alien robot fighters, or Braves, that are sleeping in the form of crystals. Their major antagonist is the flamboyant and thoroughly incompetent Walter, and the villains that follow him are often similarly humorous. The entire show is extremely focused on comedy and silliness almost to the exclusion of much in the way of storytelling, although the series does develop some running plot lines towards its end. In terms of television ratings, Goldran was the peak of the Brave series' popularity.

== Plot ==
Three boys, Takuya, Kazuki, and Dai are from Ishinowa elementary school in the sixth grade. They are actively a strong, curious, and mischievous trio. They obtain a mysterious jewel's "Power Stone". They bring back Dran, the golden robot, a brave who slept within a Power Stone and become his master. However, Prince Walter Walzac, who wants the Power Stone, has attacked them. They then go on an adventure searching for eight Power Stones that were scattered all over the world, searching for El Dorado's Legendra with Goldran.

== Characters ==
=== Brave's Master ===
Takuya Harashima (原島 拓矢, Harashima Takuya)
Voiced by: Omi Minami
12 years old. The leader of the trio. His good techniques is acting like a whiny child that tricks adults. He's a very active, cheerful and very greedy shrewd boy. He likes video games and plastic models. He hates studying, causing a stroke just to have heard the word "Test". He's quick-witted about mischief.
Kazuki Tokimura (時村 和樹, Tokimura Kazuki)
Voiced by: Chiaki Morita
12 years old. He's a childhood friend of Takuya. He is tall and very smart and has the knowledge of a university student. And he is the brain of the trio. He does a very cynical, severe speech and behavior. However, his zeal to the adventure is not completely inferior at all to the other two. He likes inventing, and his dream to apply an invention that a person can make. He likes idol-type girls, and he also likes pretty girls with round butts.

Dai Suganuma (須賀沼 大, Suganuma Dai)
Voiced by: Kosuke Okano
12 years old, a childhood friend of Takuya. He has a thickish physique, and is very good at sports. He is an animal romanticist in the mild-mannered nature. However, he assists in their adventures, to the intrigue of Takuya and Kazuki. He is also obstinate. He writes an adventure diary every day. He likes cooking and flower arrangements.

=== The Walzac Republic Empire (ワルザック共和帝国, Waruzakku Kyouwa Teikoku) ===
Walter Walzac (ワルター・ワルザック, Warutā Waruzakku)
Voiced by: Toshiyuki Morikawa
20 years old. A royal prince of the Walzac and serves as the main antagonist for the first half of the series. After awakening Captain Shark he becomes a protagonist and changes his name to Captain Eta Izak (イーター・イーザック船長, Itā Izakku Senchō)
Colonel Sangross (カーネル・サングロス, Kāneru Sangurosu)
Voiced by: Chafurin
60 years old. Walter's butler and second in command. Very loyal to his master and disciplined.
Serious Walzac (シリアス・ワルザック, Shiriasu Waruzakku)
Voiced by: Sayuri Sadaoka
12 years old. A second prince of the Walzac and very cold hearted. He is often accompanied by cyborg soldiers and his dog, Razor (レイザー, Reizā).
Sharanla Sheathluh (シャランラ・シースルー, Sharanra Shīsurū)
Voiced by: Junko Asami
20 years old. Prince Walter's fiance and stalker. She loves Walter very much despite him not loving her in return.
Treasure Walzac (トレジャー・ワルザック, Torejā Waruzakku)
Voiced by: Shigezō Sasaoka
Emperor of the Walzac.

== The Braves ==
The mecha themselves, called Braves, were created by prolific mechanical designer Kunio Okawara. While some of the Braves transform into transportation (e.g. cars and trains), others transform into animals (e.g. dinosaur and shark). Goldran itself is formed from Dran (a car) and Golgon (a kaiju). The Braves themselves are aliens from planet Legendra (レジェンドラ, Rejendora) in the Golden Galaxy created by Lady Licca The Legendra (レディリカ・ド・レジェンドラ, Redirika Do Rejendora). If the Braves are defeated or their masters are killed they will revert into Power Stones, indestructible gems that can only reactivate them by reciting an ancient incantation. When not in combat the Braves can regenerate from any wound they received.

=== Gold Braves (黄金勇者, Ougon Yūsha) ===
- Great Goldran (グレートゴルドラン, Gurēto Gorudoran) (Voiced by Ken Narita): the ultimate form of Goldran. All Gold braves were united with each other. The finisher is Great Archery (Golden Arrow).
  - Sky Goldran (スカイゴルドラン, Sukai Gorudoran) (Voiced by Ken Narita): the second form of Goldran. He got the ability to fly, because he united with Sora-Kage. His weapon is the Missile launcher.
    - Goldran (ゴルドラン, Gorudoran) (Voiced by Ken Narita): a large golden robot with which Dran unites with Golgon. He has a weak point: he cannot fly, although the jet boosters under his feet grant him levitation. His weapons are SUPER Ryugaken (super dragon fang sword) and Leg Buster and Shoulder Vulcan and Arm Shooter.
      - Dran (ドラン, Doran) (Voiced by Ken Narita): he is a Samurai robot. He transforms into a golden sports car (McLaren F1). His weapon is Ryugaken(dragon fang sword) and it's a long Japanese sword. He has difficulty dealing with his naughty masters, being like their guardian. He panicked considerably because four children were born to Maria, who was the girl who had helped him and the planet where only robots live. His children's names are, the eldest son, Dorataro, the second son, Dorajiro, the third son, Dorasaburo, and his daughter, Dorayo. He forms the chest of Goldran.
      - Golgon (ゴルゴン, Gorugon): she is a Golden Godzilla robot. She is a partner of Dran, and they trust each other. She shows up from the earth. She was manipulated one time by Walter. She forms the body and head of Goldran.
    - Sora-Kage (空影, Sorakage) (Voiced by Naoki Makishima): a golden Ninja robot. He transforms into a golden hawk robot. The joker of the group. He seems that he is not suitable for a secret activity because his golden body is too distracting. His weapons are Hishouken and Shuriken and Sickle and chain, Shadow launcher. He forms the wings of Sky Goldran and could create a set of wings for Lean Kaiser to create Sky Leon Kaiser, though this form was never seen in the show.
    - Leon Kaiser (レオンカイザー, Reon Kaizā) (Voiced by Ryotaro Okiayu): a robot with which Leon unites with Kaiser. His weapons are Kaiser Javelin and Kaiser Gun and Kaiser Fan. He forms the body additions of Great Goldran.
      - Leon (レオン, Reon) (Voiced by Ryotaro Okiayu): he is a horned shōgun-styled robot. Transforming into an orange fighter jet (McDonnell Douglas F/A-18 Hornet). He is considerably high-handed, because he is a shōgun. However, he's a loyal, faithful person. His weapon is the Naginata Sword. He is a brave found by the last clue, first fought alone. He forms the chest of Leon Kaiser.
      - Kaiser (カイザー, Kaizā): he is a golden lion robot. He is Leon's partner; summoned by Leon. He forms the body and head of Leon Kaiser.
      - Sky Leon Kaiser (スカイレオンカイザー, Sukai Reon Kaizā): the second form of Leon Kaiser who can fly after merging with Sora-Kage to form the same winged backpack as Sky Goldran. In this form he can also use the Missile launcher. This form was never seen in the show, though the toys could combine to create this form.

=== Silver Knights (シルバーナイツ, Shirubā Naitsu) ===
- God Silverion (ゴッドシルバリオン, Goddo Shirubarion) (Voiced by Naoki Bando): the ultimate form of all Silver Knights. His self-insistence is more intenser from Silverion because Fire Silver increases Silverion's powers. His finishing move is "God Finish".
  - Silverion (シルバリオン, Shirubarion) (Voiced by Naoki Bando): silver robot formed by Jet Silver, Star Silver and Drill Silver. His arms are the Tri-Shield and Tri-Lancer.
    - Jet Silver (ジェットシルバー, Jetto Shirubā) (Voiced by Naoki Bando): the leader of the Silver Knights. He transforms from a jet plane (Grumman F-14 Tomcat) into a red robot. He is elegant and a gentleman. His weapon is a Jet Spear and Jet Shield. His motif is a knight in Greece. He forms the torso of Silverion or God Silverion.
    - Star Silver (スターシルバー, Sutā Shirubā) (Voiced by Naoki Bando): he transforms from a patrol car (Ferrari Testarossa) into a blue robot. He is cheerful and is snappish at times. His motif is a knight in Rome. His weapon is the Star Sword and Star Shield. He forms the arms and head of Silverion or God Silverion.
    - Drill Silver (ドリルシルバー, Doriru Shirubā) (Voiced by Naoki Bando): he transforms from a drill tank into a green robot. He has herculean strength and is obstinate. His weapon is the Drill Axe and Drill Shield. His motif is a horned Viking in Northern Europe. He forms the legs of Silverion or God Silverion.
  - Fire Silver (ファイヤーシルバー, Faiyā Shirubā) (Voiced by Naoki Bando): he transforms from an ambulance (Nissan Atlas Paramedic) into a robot. He is more cheerful than Star Silver and likes joking around. His weapon is the Fire Bowgun (crossbow) and Fire Shield. He forms the body additions of God Silverion.

=== Other Braves ===
- Advenger (アドベンジャー, Adobenjā) (Voiced by Chafurin): transforms from a steam locomotive (JNR Class C62) into a large robot. Advenger has the braves living in his hangars. He flies over the sky, run in space, and can ride the Railroad of Light that leads to Legendra. Takuya and the Braves go out to travel for the adventure, getting on-board him. Combines with Captain Shark by becoming a shoulder loaded cannon.
- Captain Shark (キャプテンシャーク, Kyaputen Shāku) (Voiced by Jin Yamanoi): hidden ninth brave. Transforming into a shark, he was originally not supposed to be awakened unless the eight braves on earth were to fall into the hands of evil. Can combine with everyone through others grabbing onto him and cannon Advenger to pool their strengths together.

== Walzac Machines ==
- Zazorigun (ザゾリガン, Zazorigan): appears starting in episode 1 although is not seen in humanoid robot form until episode 11. Powers include flight, storing custom gears, dual double laser cannons, a scorpion form, burrowing, a shield on the left wrist, and three laser guns in the forehead. Customized from Transformers Generation 1 Scorponok though he was never released as a toy in this line.
- Custom Gear (カスタムギア, Kasutamu Gia): appears starting in episode 1. Powers include flight, a beam machine gun, foot skis, a bazooka, and burrowing. Reappear in Brave Saga and Brave Saga 2.
  - Missile Gear (ミサイルギア, Misairu Gia): appears in episodes 13 and 14. Powers include transforming into a car and a missile on each shoulder.
  - Excel Gear (エクセルギア, Ekuseru Gia): appears starting in episode 30. Powers include flight, a beam machine gun, and a flamethrower.
- Cannonga (キャノンガー, Kyanongaa): appears in episode 1. Powers include flight, three cannons on each wrist, a cannon on each shoulder and knee, shoulder spike missiles, and a bomb launcher on the back.
- Desetron: appears in episode 2. Powers include flight, an electric tentacle in the left wrist, and a fan in the torso strong enough to produce sandstorms.
- Marinda: appears in episode 3. Powers include swimming, a machine gun and water gun hybrid called the Aqua Cutter Gun for the right arm, foot skis, and a grapple claw in the abdomen.
- Sonicron: appears in episode 4. Powers include flight, wing bombs, and a laser cannon.
- Turbolar: appears in episode 5. Powers include speed, a race car mode, a rifle, and levitation.
- Cementos: appears in episode 6. Powers include flight, a cement mixer on each hip, and a Chinese sword.
- Waltzheimer X (ワルツハイマーX, Warutuhaimaa X): appears in episode 7. Powers include laser turrets around the body, tank treads, and a powerful cannon called the Great Big Cannon hidden under the bridge.
- Lambda: appears in episode 8. Powers include flight, a shotgun, a chainsaw in each arm, and foot wheels.
- Kermadick: appears in episode 9. Powers include swimming, retractable claw arms with the hand ends launchable on a wire, and palm lasers.
- King Fanfan (キングファンファン, Kingu Fanfan): appears in episode 10. Powers include flight, hurricane winds from the fans on its shoulders, and firing electric barriers from the forehead crescent.
- Death Garrigun (デスギャリガン, Desu Gyarigan): appears starting in episode 12 although it is not seen in humanoid robot form until episode 30. Customized from Transformers - Battlestars: Return of Convoy's Sky Garry. Powers include flight, storage of custom gears, a pair of powerful main cannons on each foot, a double barreled defense turret on each shoulder and below the bridge, a torso heat ray that can destroy a Himalayan mountain in one hit, launchable arms, and three laser guns in the forehead.
  - Cyber Death Garrigun (サイバーデスギャリガン, Saibaa Desu Gyarigan): appears in episodes 46 and 47. Powers include flight, teleportation, body missiles, body lasers, a torso heat beam, and regeneration.
- Blizzardos: appears in episode 12. Powers include flight, a fan on each shoulder and in the torso that emit freezing winds, a bazooka, and a machine gun in each finger with explosive bullets.
- Samonda: appears in episode 13. Powers include flight, a rocket launcher, and dividing itself into smaller robots.
- Plasma Pulse: appears in episode 14. Powers include levitation, lightning bolts from the thunder bolts in each hand, and an electric cage platform on the back.
- Kamaruta: appears in episode 15. Powers include flight, a net gun in the right hand, and three launchable scythe bladed fingers on each hand.
- Inoichigo: appears in episode 15. Powers include creating realistic holograms of previous gear commanders and a bomb cannon in the "neck".
- Giga Polygon: appears in episode 17. Powers include a machine gun on each shoulder and flight.
- Joint Long: appears in episode 18. Powers include flight, swimming, and combining. Walter's can also release a pair of chains from within the torso armed with red electricity.
  - Joint Long King: appears in episode 18. Powers include flight, coiling, and red electric bolts from the eyes.
- Mogelaser: appears in episode 19. Powers include burrowing in tank form, a large nose drill armed with a flamethrower, and a pair of rocket pods in the torso.
- Walkion: appears in episode 20. Powers include flight, a 6-tube rocket pod in each shoulder, a rapier that emits pink electric beams, and spawning four holograms of itself. Reappears in Brave Saga and Brave Saga 2.
- Hell Thomas: appears in episode 21. Powers include pincer claw arms while in train mode and a staff made of railroad ties that can emit electricity. It's named after Thomas the Tank Engine
- Metal Satan: appears in episode 22. Powers include flight, a double bladed scythe, and a beam cannon in the torso.
- Shell Buster: appears in episode 23. Powers include a giant drill form, spike missiles from each shield, and speed.
- Striker: appears in episode 24. Powers include morphing into a flying soccer ball, a large iron ball stored in the torso, and a machine gun in the mouth.
- Dan Golem: appears in episode 25. Powers include burrowing through solid rock, flight, and a ball form.
- Warudoran (ワルドラン, Warudoran): appears in episode 27. Powers include transforming into a super sonic jet, an imitation Imperial Sword, and fusing with Golgon.
  - Dark Goldran (ダークゴルドラン, Daaku Gorudoran): appears in episode 27. Powers include Arm Shooters, Leg Busters, flight, and an imitation Super Imperial Sword.
- Despider: appears in episode 28. Powers include flight, webs from the four spider legs from its back, and a spider-like probe in the torso
- Nova: appears in episode 28. Powers include flight and a powerful heat ray in the torso.
- Metia: appears in episode 29. Powers include flight, swimming, four bladed legs, emitting pink electricity from the body, and self destructing.
- Ultima: appears in episodes 30 and 31. Powers include flight, beam absorbing and rechanneling, an electric grapple claw, and swimming.
- Ribaibaron (リバイバロン, Ribaibaron): appears in episode 31. A combination from several Transformers characters such as being able to transform into a jet form from Transformers Zone's Sonic Bomber. Powers include a drill from Transformers Zone's Dai Atlas, flight, and beam rifle. His head is based on Red Geist from The Brave of Legend Da-Garn, who in turn was based on Transformers Victory's Deszaras.
- Schwanstein (シュヴァンシュタイン, Shuvanshutain): appears starting in episode 31. Powers include light speed flight, controlling five replicas of the original Death Garrigun, an electric cage on the bow, a planet destroying energy cannon in its bow called the Planet Buster, laser turrets, and reformation.
- Zorbetto: Appears in episode 34. Powers include flight and a pair of beam guns.
- Veetazen: appears in episode 35. Powers include flight, ten laser guns on its top, four laser guns on its bottom, and seven laser cannons in the center of the body.
- Bazaruto: appears in episode 36. Powers include flight, an energy ball cannon on the underside, a freezing foam canister, a triple laser canister, a 19-barreled machine gun canister, a cyclone launcher canister, a double barreled energy turret in its top, a laser gun in each of its five legs, and an electric net canister.
- Biskvito: appears in episode 38. Powers include flight, a pair of laser guns on each wing, and four machine guns on the nose.
- Embryo: appears in episodes 39 and 43. Powers include flight, teleportation, eight electric tentacles armed with laser guns in the tips, a psychic barrier that can throw objects, and can emit highly destructive heat shockwaves and beams from its face. Reappears in Brave Saga.
  - Duplicate Embryo: appears in episode 43. They are four duplications of Embryo armed with only flight, teleportation, and tentacles with only the laser gun armed tips. Unlike the original they can also emit energy beams from their side fins.
- Draiek: appears in episode 40. Powers include flight, eight double barreled laser turrets, and forming electric cages by separating.
- Genociz: appears in episode 41. Powers include flight, two large vortex emitters, and six tentacles.
- Treasury (マーチャンダイジング, Maachandaijingu; Merchandising): appears in episodes 46, 47, and 48. It is the flagship of the Walzac Republic Empire commanded by Treasure Walzac armed with a star destroying warhead called the Death Mark (デスマルク, Desu Maruku).

== Other Hostiles ==
- Eskalpone: appears in episode 8. Powers include smokescreen, flight, and a double barreled turret on the back.
- Usarin: appears in episodes 16, 28, and 29. Powers include flight, fourteen remote controlled beam guns called Carrot Bits stored in its basket, and a large hammer called the Picopico Hammer. Reappears in Brave Saga and Brave Saga 2.
- Mirror Cat Demon: appears in episode 25. Powers include levitation, speed, green eye beams, and an elongated demon form.
- Constructionbot: appear in episode 32. Powers include foot wheels, drill arms, a pair of machine guns in the body, and a pair of rockets in the torso.
- Majin Mugore: appears in episode 32. Powers include levitation, mouth flames, and eye beams.
- Alien Alkali: Appear in 33. They are armed with a revolver.
  - Alkali Fortress: appears in episode 33. Powers include flight, probes armed with a pair of laser guns, a mouth with suction and a heat beam, and energy bolts from its left eye.
- Sodovenger: appears in episode 37. It is a copy of Advenger from planet Sodra. Reappears in Brave Saga 2.
- Sogoldran: appears in episode 37. It is a copy of Sky Goldran from planet Sodra. Aside from Sky Godran's powers it can also extend its body parts and has a powerful cannon in its torso. Reappears in Brave Saga 2.
- Sodon Kaiser: appears in episode 37. It is a copy of Leon Kaiser from planet Sodra. Reappears in Brave Saga 2.
- God Sodoverion: appears in episode 37. It is a copy of God Silverion from planet Sodra. Reappears in Brave Saga 2.
- Gargoyle: appears in episode 42. Its only known power is heat beams.

== Episodes ==
No.	Title	Directed by	Written by	Original release date
1	"Awaken! Golden Hero" "Mezameyo! Kogane Yūsha" (目覚めよ!黄金勇者)	Directed by : Yasuhiro Minami; Storyboarded by : Shinji Takamatsu	Hiroyuki Kawasaki	February 4, 1995
2	"His Name is Advenger" "Sono na wa Adobenjā" (その名はアドベンジャー)	Shinichi Watanabe	Hiroyuki Kawasaki	February 11, 1995
3	"The Great Adventure on a Southern Island" "Minami no Shima de Dai Bōken" (南の島で大冒険!)	Directed by : Naoki Hishikawa; Storyboarded by : Kazuhito Kikuchi	Hiroyuki Kawasaki	February 18, 1995
4	"A Roundabout Jungle Chase!" "Guruguru Janguru Dai Tsuiseki!" (ぐるぐるジャングル大追跡!)	Kunihisa Sugishima	Masaharu Amiya	February 25, 1995
5	"Love is an Extreme Fireball Race!" "Koi wa Kageki na Hi no Tama Rēsu" (恋は過激な火の玉レース!)	Directed by : Yūji Yamaguchi; Storyboarded by : Kazuhito Kikuchi	Masashi Noro; Hiroyuki Kawasaki	March 4, 1995
6	"A Detective's Story in Flowery Edo" "Hana no Oedo de Torimono Hikae" (花のお江戸で捕物控)	Yasuhiro Minami	Kenichi Araki	March 11, 1995
7	"Super Fist Love to Great Combination!" "Chō Hatsukoi de Dai Gattai!" (超初恋で大合体!)	Shinichi Watanabe	Hiroyuki Kawasaki	March 18, 1995
8	"The Stolen Power Stone" "Ubawareta Pawāsutōn" (奪われたパワーストーン)	Naoki Hishikawa	Yoshiyuki Suga	March 25, 1995
9	"Today's Holiday, but Pirates!?" "Honjitsu Kyūjitsu Yappa Kaizoku!?" (本日休日やっぱ海賊!?)	Kunihisa Sugishima	Masaharu Amiya	April 1, 1995
10	"Burn Up! Chibi Dragon" "Moeyo! Chibidoragon" (燃えよ!チビドラゴン)	Yūji Yamaguchi	Yoshiyuki Suga	April 8, 1995
11	"Debut! Super Fortress Robo" "Shutsugen! Chō Do-kyū Yōsai Robo" (出現!超ド級要塞ロボ)	Directed by : Yasuhiro Minami; Storyboarded by : Kazuhito Kikuchi	Kenichi Araki	April 15, 1995
12	"If it Melts, Chaos will Break Out" "Tokete Nagarerya Dai Konran" (とけて流れりゃ大混乱)	Shinichi Watanabe	Yasunori Yamada	April 22, 1995
13	"Fun?! Kindergarten" "Tanoshī?! Yōchien" (たのしい?!幼稚園)	Shinichi Watanabe	Yasunori Yamada	April 29, 1995
14	"The Golden Ninja Arrives" "Kogane Ninja Sanjō" (黄金忍者参上!)	Kunihisa Sugishima	Hiroyuki Kawasaki	May 6, 1995
15	"Great Sky Fusion! Sky Goldran" "Ōzora Gattai! Sukai Gorudoran" (大空合体!スカイゴルドラン)	Yūji Yamaguchi	Yoshiyuki Suga	May 13, 1995
16	"A Lovestruck Maiden is 100 Megatons" "Koisurutome wa Ichi Oku Megaton" (恋する乙女は一億メガトン)	Yasuhiro Minami	Kenichi Araki	May 20, 1995
17	"Michiru-sensei in Danger!?" "Michiru Sensei Kikiippatsu!?" (ミチル先生危機一髪!?)	Shinichi Watanabe	Yoshiyuki Suga	May 27, 1995
18	"The President of Another Dimension" "I Jiden Sekai no Daitōryō" (異次元世界の大統領)	Directed by : Naoki Hishikawa; Storyboarded by : Kazuhito Kikuchi	Kenichi Araki	June 3, 1995
19	"Catch the Phoenix" "Fenikkusu o Kamaeru" (フェニックスをつかまえろ)	Kunihisa Sugishima	Yasunori Yamada	June 10, 1995
20	"Walter's Great Adventure" "Warutā no Dai Bōken" (ワルターの大冒険)	Yūji Yamaguchi	Masaharu Amiya	June 17, 1995
21	"A Great Deduction on a Panic Train" "Panikku Ressha de Mei Suiri" (パニック列車で名推理)	Naoki Hishikawa	Hiroyuki Kawasaki	June 24, 1995
22	"Super Silver Fusion God Silverion" "Chō Shirogane(Shirubā) Gattai Goddo Shirubarion" (超白銀(シルバー)合体 ゴッドシルバリオン)	Shinichi Watanabe	Hiroyuki Kawasaki	July 1, 1995
23	"Deserted Island Survival!" "Mujintōda yo Sabaibaru!" (無人島だよサバイバル!)	Yasuhiro Minami	Yoshiyuki Suga	July 8, 1995
24	"A Reversal Shoot of Friendship" "Yūjō no Gyakuten Shūto" (友情の逆転シュート)	Kunihisa Sugishima	Yoshiyuki Suga	July 15, 1995
25	"Summer Mystery Series - Tales of Cat Island" "Natsu no Kaiki Shirīzu Nekojima Kidan" (夏の怪奇シリーズ猫島奇談)	Yūji Yamaguchi	Masaharu Amiya	July 22, 1995
26	"The Hero Investigation Order" "Yūsha Chōsa Shirei" (勇者調査指令)	Naoki Hishikawa	Hiroyuki Kawasaki	July 29, 1995
27	"Operation Golgon Heist" "Gorugon Gōdatsu Sakusen" (ゴルゴン強奪作戦)	Shinichi Watanabe	Kenichi Araki	August 5, 1995
28	"Golden General Leon Arrives!" "Kogane Shōgun Reon Suizan!" (黄金将軍レオン推参!)	Directed by : Yasuhiro Minami; Storyboarded by : Kazuhito Kikuchi	Yasunori Yamada	August 12, 1995
29	"Fierce Battle! Leon Kaiser" "Gekitō! Reon Kaizā" (激闘!レオンカイザー)	Kunihisa Sugishima	Masaharu Amiya	August 19, 1995
30	"Assemble! 8 Braves" "Shūketsu! 8-ri no Yūsha" (集結!8人の勇者)	Directed by : Naoki Hishikawa; Storyboarded by : Yūji Yamaguchi	Hiroyuki Kawasaki	August 26, 1995
31	"Golden Beast Combination Great Goldran" "Kogane-jū Gattai Gurēto Gorudoran" (黄金獣合体グレートゴルドラン)	Directed by : Yasuhiro Minami; Storyboarded by : Shinji Takamatsu	Hiroyuki Kawasaki	September 9, 1995
32	"Green Planet Holy Warrior" "Midori no Hoshi no Seisen-shi" (緑の星の聖戦士)	Naoki Hishikawa	Yoshiyuki Suga	September 16, 1995
33	"Birth of a Childbearing Hero" "Tanjō Kozure Yūsha" (誕生子連れ勇者)	Shinichi Watanabe	Kenichi Araki	September 23, 1995
34	"An Illusionary Blue Sky" "Maboroshi no Aozora" (まぼろしの青空)	Kunihisa Sugishima	Shō Aikawa	September 30, 1995
35	"A New Hero who Breaks the Law" "Okite-yaburi no Shin Yūsha" (掟破りの新勇者)	Yūji Yamaguchi	Hiroyuki Kawasaki	October 7, 1995
36	"He's Strong! Captain Shark" "Tsuyoi zo! Same Senchō(Kyaputen Shāku)" (強いぞ!鮫船長(キャプテンシャーク))	Directed by : Naoki Hishikawa; Storyboarded by : Kazuhito Kikuchi	Hiroyuki Kawasaki	October 14, 1995
37	"Farewell Golden Hero - Legendra Forever" "Saraba Kogane Yūsha － Rejendora yo Eien Ni -" (さらば黄金勇者 －レジェンドラよ、永遠に－)	Shinichi Watanabe	Masaharu Amiya	October 21, 1995
38	"Sing! Brave Corps" "Utae! Yūsha-tai" (歌え!勇者隊)	Yasuhiro Minami	Yoshiyuki Suga	November 4, 1995
39	"The Amazing New Combination Technique" "Kyōi no Shin Gattai-waza" (驚異の新合体技)	Kunihisa Sugishima	Kenichi Araki	November 11, 1995
40	"Children's Land" "Okusama Rando" (おこさまランド)	Naoki Hishikawa	Yasunori Yamada	November 18, 1995
41	"Dream Planet" "Yume Wakusei" (夢の惑星)	Yūji Yamaguchi	Aya Matsui	November 25, 1995
42	"The Hero from the Skies" "Ten Kata Kita Yūsha" (天から来た勇者)	Directed by : Yasuhiro Minami; Storyboarded by : Kazuhito Kikuchi	Aya Matsui	December 2, 1995
43	"The Miraculous Super Special Move" "Kiseki no Chō Hissawaza" (奇跡の超必殺技)	Shinichi Watanabe	Yasunori Yamada	December 9, 1995
44	"Gate of Betrayal" "Uragiri no Mon" (裏切りの門)	Kunihisa Sugishima	Masaharu Amiya	December 16, 1995
45	"Endless Defeat" "Kagiri Naki Haiboku" (限りなき敗北)	Directed by : Naoki Hishikawa; Storyboarded by : Kazuhito Kikuchi	Yoshiyuki Suga	December 23, 1995
46	"Absolute Loneliness" "Zettai no Kodoku" (絶対の孤独)	Directed by : Yasuhiro Minami; Storyboarded by : Shinji Takamatsu	Hiroyuki Kawasaki	January 6, 1996
47	"True Energy" "Hontō no Enajī" (本当のエナジー)	Directed by : Naoki Hishikawa; Storyboarded by : Shinji Takamatsu	Hiroyuki Kawasaki	January 20, 1996
48	"Our Adventure Begins" "Bōken ga Hajimaru" (冒険がはじまる!)	Shinji Takamatsu	Hiroyuki Kawasaki	January 27, 1996

== See also ==
- Brave series

Preceded by Brave Police J-Decker	Brave series 1995-1996	Succeeded by Brave Command Dagwon
