= Naoki Bandō =

Japanese voice actor (1957–2026)

- 坂東 尚樹
- Born: Koichiro Bandō (坂東 耕一郎); December 12, 1957; Asahikawa, Hokkaido, Japan
- Died: September 28, 2026 (aged 68)
- Occupation: Voice actor
- Agent: Production Ace

Naoki Bandō (坂東 尚樹, Bandō Naoki; December 12, 1957 – September 28, 2026) was a Japanese voice actor affiliated with Production Ace who worked primarily in video games and anime.

Bandō voiced Lord Emon in Shadow of the Colossus and Larikush in Baten Kaitos. Some of his anime voice roles include Gatō in Naruto. He was also the voice of Splatter in the Japanese dubbed version of the feature film Thomas and the Magic Railroad.

== Life and career ==
Naoki Bandō was born in Asahikawa, Hokkaido, Japan on December 12, 1957. During his junior high and high school years, Bandō lived in Hakodate.

He moved from Hokkaido to Tokyo to attend the Department of Japanese Literature (Evening Division) in the Faculty of Letters at Hosei University. However, he spent the tuition money provided by his parents on the Evening Division of the Seinenza Theater Company Actor's Training Institute and dropped out after two years.

Aspiring to become an actor, he graduated from the regular course of the Gekidan Seinenza Theater Company's Actor Training School and then joined the Gekidan Shinjinkai Theater Company. However, his small stature made him look overshadowed on stage, so he rarely got good roles.

The reason he started voice acting was because he held an academic complex deep down, still carrying a bit of a bitter, cynical attitude, thinking, "After all, I'm just a theater person who never properly learned voice training for voice acting." While helping with sound effects during a stage production, he developed a deeper interest in sound, which ultimately led him to pursue voice acting. A senior from the theater company, who used to voice act, found out and said to him, "If you're good with sound, why don't you give it a shot?"

Around that time, the television anime City Hunter had started airing. With a massive list of antagonists appearing every week, they needed all the extra talent they could get, leading to Bandō being called in for recordings almost every week. In 1991, he passed an audition and secured his first regular voice role as Guard Star in The Brave of Sun Fighbird.

A founding member of Kyu Production, he was affiliated with Mausu Promotion, Liberta, ALBA, and Production Ace throughout his life. When he started to get voice work once per week, it became difficult to fit two-month stage performances into his schedule. Believing that juggling both would be difficult, he made the decision to transfer to a voice acting agency.

In 2011, Bandō established the voice acting academy Shovel Tech and began to mentor younger talent.

Bandō died on September 28, 2026, at the age of 68. His death was publicly announced days later on October 2 of that year by Production Ace.

== Filmography ==
=== Television animation ===
- Hikaru no Go (2001) – Shinoda Insei Instructor (ep 63)
- Rockman EXE Beast (2005) – Zoano DarkMan
- One Punch Man (2019) – Elder Centipede

Unknown date

- Armored Trooper VOTOMS: The Heretic Saint – Elder C (ep 3); Officer (ep 5); Pope Theo VIII
- Bakumatsu Kikansetsu Irohanihoheto – Hata Meifuu (eps 5–8); Tatsugorou Shinmon (eps 6, 9–14)
- Battle Spirits: Brave – Elder
- Battle Spirits: Shōnen Gekiha Dan – Old Otherworld King (ep 26)
- Berserk – Owen
- Betterman – Officer
- The Brave of Sun Fighbird – Guard Star, Guardion
- The Brave of Gold Goldran – Jet Silver, Star Silver, Drill Silver, Fire Silver, Silverion, God Silverion
- The Bush Baby – Kankari
- Chimera - Angel of Death – Hitman
- City Hunter: Bay City Wars – Soldier A
- Code Geass: Lelouch of the Rebellion – Izumi
- Crayon Shin-chan – 20-year-old D (ep 173); Junichi Ishizaka
- D.Gray-man – Alphonse Claus (ep 45)
- Daa! Daa! Daa! – Principal
- Detective Conan – Masaharu Motoyama (eps 371–372)
- The Five Star Stories – Man E
- Gokudo – King
- Gunslinger Girl: Il Teatrino – Inspector Moro (ep 4)
- Hakkenden: Legend of the Dog Warriors – Yoshinari Satome (ep 11)
- Hyper Police – lizard A (ep 5); Mudagami
- Ki*Me*Ra – Soldier
- Kobato. – Addition voice(ep 5)
- Kodocha – Maeda-san
- Lupin III: The Columbus Files (special) – Doctor A
- Madlax – Nayman
- Magic User's Club – TV Broadcaster
- Mao-chan – Tokusaburo Tokugawa
- Matchless Raijin-Oh – Heavy Metal Man (ep 33)
- Miracle Girls – Yoshimura-sensei (ep 11)
- Mobile Suit Victory Gundam – Fusark; Otis Arkins
- Monster – Janáček
- Moonlight Mile – Noguchi (eps 9–11)
- Mujin Wakusei Survive – Tako
- Naruto – Gatoo; Toubei Kagetsu (ep 186)
- Nightwalker – Director (ep 2); Doctor (ep 3); Furano (ep 4)
- Nurse Angel Ririka SOS – Announcer (ep 30); Dark Joker (ep 34); Hiroshi Uzaki
- Photon: The Idiot Adventures – Bandit 1
- Pom Poko – Male tanuki A
- Rockman.EXE Beast – Zoan Darkman
- Shugo Chara! – Kōtarō Himeno (ep 49)
- Slayers – Examiner A (ep 16)
- The Story of Saiunkoku – Enjun Sa-taiho; Young Enjun Sa
- Sword for Truth – Officer A
- Ultra Nyan 2: Happy Daisakusen – Goemon
- Urayasu Tekkin Kazoku – Kintetsu Oosawagi; Toragorou Ushimatsu
- Warau Salesman – Additional voice(s)
- Witch Hunter Robin – Institute Head
- Yawara! A Fashionable Judo Girl – Fujiko's Father
- Yomigaeru Sora - Rescue Wings – Hirofumi Morimoto (eps 8–9)
- Zipang – Matome Ugaki

=== Theatrical animation ===
- Crayon Shin-chan: Action Kamen vs Leotard Devil (xxxx) – Staff
- Crayon Shin-chan: The Secret Treasure of Buri Buri Kingdom (xxxx) – Guard
- Crayon Shin-chan: Adventure in Henderland (xxxx) – TV Caster
- Yo-kai Watch: Enma Daiō to Itsutsu no Monogatari da Nyan! (2016)

=== Original video animation (OVA) ===
- Mobile Suit Gundam: The Origin (2016) – Torenov Y. Minovsky

=== Video games ===
- Ace Combat 5: The Unsung War PS2 (xxxx) – Additional Voices
- Baten Kaitos: Eternal Wings and the Lost Ocean GameCube (xxxx) – Larikush
- Rockman DASH: Hagane no Boukenshin Nintendo 64, PC, PS, PSP – Police Inspector, Officer, Wily
- Skylanders: Giants PS3, Wii Wii U, Xbox 360 (xxxx) – Arkeyan Conquertron, Arkeyan King
- Bloody Roar 4 PS2 (xxxx) – Long the Tiger
- Shadow of the Colossus PS2, PS3 (xxxx) – Lord Emon
- Lego Island (1997) – Captain D. Rom
- Okage: Shadow King PS2 (2001) – Narrator

=== Tokusatsu ===
- Ninpuu Sentai Hurricanger (2002) – Disaster Ninja Kangaroulette

=== Drama CDs ===
- Happy Time (xxxx) – Saegusa
- Ishiguro Kazuomi shi no, Sasayaka na Tanoshimi (xxxx) – Mitamura

=== Dubbing roles ===
==== Live-action ====
- Airheads – Pip (Adam Sandler)
- Bottoms Up – Uncle Earl Peadman (David Keith)
- Christopher Robin – Giles Winslow Jr. (Mark Gatiss)
- Downfall – Hans Krebs (Rolf Kanies)
- Dreamcatcher – Joe "Beaver" Clarendon (Jason Lee)
- The Family Man – Arnie (Jeremy Piven)
- Gossip Girl – Roman (William Abadie)
- Joey – Zach Miller (Miguel A. Núñez Jr.)
- Kung Fu Hustle – Donut
- The Matrix – Tank (Marcus Chong)
- The Motorcycle Diaries – Alberto Granado (Rodrigo de la Serna)
- New York Minute – Maxamillion "Max" Lomax (Eugene Levy)
- Screamers – Private Ross (Charles Powell)
- Serendipity – Dean Kansky (Jeremy Piven)
- Space Jam – Muggsy Bogues
- A Star Is Born – Carl (Ron Rifkin)
- Star Trek: The Motion Picture – Hikaru Sulu (George Takei)
- Storm Catcher – Captain "Sparks" Johnson (Mystro Clark)
- The Take – Marco Ruiz (Yul Vazquez)
- They Found Hell – Dr. Maro
- Tomorrowland – Science Teacher (David Nykl)

==== Animation ====
- Batman: The Brave and the Bold – Doctor Sivana
- Exchange Student Zero – Principal Rogerson
- Thomas and the Magic Railroad – Splatter
