= Yukiji =

Japanese voice actress

Akiko Suzuki
- 鈴木 晶子
- Born: July 22, 1965 (age 61)
- Other name: Yukiji
- Agent: 81 Produce

Akiko Suzuki (鈴木 晶子, Suzuki Akiko; born July 22, 1965), formally known by the stage name Yukiji (ゆきじ), is a Japanese voice actress affiliated with 81 Produce.

== Anime voice roles ==
- Azuki-chan (Tomomi "Tomo-chan" Takahashi)
- Anpanman (Crayonman)
- Chocotto Sister (Takeshi (ep.14, 17))
- Duel Masters (Great Bucketman)
- Flint the Time Detective (Genshi-kun/Flint)
- Fushigiboshi no Futagohime (Buumo)
- Hanasaka Tenshi Ten-Ten-kun (Ten-Ten-kun)
- Hikaru no Go (Masako Kanako)
- Inazuma Eleven GO Chrono Stone (Tobu)
- Jyu Oh Sei (Yadou (ep.1))
- Konjiki no Gash Bell!! (Nyarurato)
- Mirmo Zibang! (Yashichi)
- O-bake no... Holly (Kakaashin, Stereon)
- PaRappa the Rapper (Servant robot (ep.7))
- Pokémon Crystal: Raikou Ikazuchi no Densetsu (special) (Raichu)
- Pokémon (Hiroki, Otachi, Samurai)
- Rave Master (Plue, Ruby)
- Rerere no Tensai Bakabon (Hajime)
- xxxHolic (Jeff (Karasu Tengu) (ep.11,16,18))
- Yawara! A Fashionable Judo Girl (Gonzalez)
- Denji Sentai Megaranger (Komutan)

=== Dubbing ===
- Rango (Lucky)

== Miscellaneous ==
- Mirmo Zibang! (Theme song performance (ED 7, ED 9))
