= Flint the Time Detective =

1998 anime series

- Show logo featuring the main characters of the anime.

時空探偵ゲンシクン (Jikū Tantei Genshi-kun)
- Genre: Anime, comedy, science fiction
- Anime television series
- Directed by: Hiroshi Fukutomi
- Written by: Fumihiko Shimo; Hideki Sonoda; Junko Okazaki; Ritsuko Hayasaka
- Music by: Tadashi Namba; Toshio Masuda
- Studio: Group TAC
- Licensed by: NA: Enoki Films(main licensee) Saban Entertainment(sub-licensee, Expired) The Walt Disney Company(sub-licensee, Expired)
- Original network: TV Tokyo
- English network: PH: GMA Network; SG: Kids Central; UK: BBC2; US: Fox Family Fox Kids
- Original run: 1 October 1998 – 24 June 1999
- Episodes: 39
- Manga

Jikū Tantei Genshi-kun
- Written by: Hideki Sonoda; Akira Yamauchi
- Published by: Kodansha
- Magazine: Comic Bom Bom
- Original run: 1999 – 2000
- Volumes: 1

Flint the Time Detective, known in Japan as Jikū Tantei Genshi-kun (時空探偵ゲンシクン; lit. 'Space-Time Detective Genshi-kun'), is a Japanese anime television series directed by Hiroshi Fukutomi. It was based on a manga by Hideki Sonoda and Akira Yamauchi and was published by Bros. Comics in Japan. A second manga running in Comic Bom Bom was also produced and was released as a special promo for the anime. The anime aired in Japan from 1998 to 1999 on TV Tokyo and ran for 39 episodes.

In the United States, Flint the Time Detective aired from 5 March to 5 November 2000 on the Fox Family Channel as part of the "Made in Japan Sundays" block. Reruns were also seen on Fox Kids.

The series also aired in the Philippines via GMA 7 and dubbed in Filipino language from late 2000 until mid-2001.

Sanrio, the company best known for creating Hello Kitty, holds the license to Flint the Time Detective in Japan. It is the only title in the company's roster to date to be aimed at elementary school boys.

== Plot ==
The series is centered around the adventures of Flint Hammerhead, a boy from prehistory who was resurrected from his fossil prison and became a Time Detective for the Time Police, although his competency as a detective is dubious. Much like Inspector Gadget, much of the heavy thinking is done by Flint's friends Sarah and Tony Goodman who accompany him on his adventures. Flint, however, pulled his weight in battle when he would fight with the aid of his father Rocky Hammerhead whose partial resurrection left him a sentient talking rock with a face. Rocky, fashioned into a stone axe for Flint, served Flint as both sturdy weapon and adviser, the latter both in and out of battle. Flint's job as a Time Detective was to go back in time and convince Time-Shifters, cute, collectible creatures to ally with him to protect the timeline.

Usually, he fought against Petra Fina and her cronies Dino and Mite (very reminiscent of Marjo, Grocky, and Walther from Time Bokan), servants of the Dark Lord. The Dark Lord himself sought to use the Time-Shifters' powers to invade the Land of Time, the creatures' home realm from whence he had scattered them. Similar to Pokémon or Digimon, Time-Shifters originate as small, cute creatures who can "shape-shift" into much stronger forms for a time before reverting. This usually took two forms: an evil form (induced by the Petra Stamp, Uglinator's mark, or Dark Lord's magic) called a Con form and a good one brought forth by Flint and his team called a Master form.

== Characters ==
=== Heroes ===
Genshi (ゲンシ) / Flint Hammerhead
Voiced by: Yukiji (Japanese); R. Martin Klein (English)
The main protagonist of the story. Flint is a young, strong caveboy who was fossilized by Petra Fina with his father upon discovery of Getalong. He was freed by Dr. Bernard Goodman's technology and became a member of the Time Police. His weakness is when his stomach runs on empty. He was originally referred to as "Primitive Boy Genshi" in the original manga.
Sora Yamato (大和ソラ, Yamato Sora) / Sarah Goodman
Voiced by: Nana Mizuki (Japanese); Tifanie Christun (English)
A girl from the 25th century who is Dr. Goodman's niece and Tony Goodman's twin sister who accompanies Flint on his missions.
Tokio Yamato (大和トキオ, Yamato Tokio) / Tony Goodman
Voiced by: Chiaki Morita (Japanese); Brian Donovan (English)
A boy from the 25th century who is Dr. Goodman's nephew and Sarah Goodman's twin brother who also accompanies Flint on his missions.
Professor Yamato (大和博士, Yamato-hakase) / Dr. Bernard Goodman
Voiced by: Masamichi Satō (Japanese); Richard Cansino (English)
A scientist who is the uncle of Sarah and Tony Goodman. He was the one who restored Flint and Getalong. Bernard has a crush on Jillian Gray and he is responsible in sending a time shifter to aid Flint. In the manga, he smokes. In the anime, he only smokes during his teenage years.
Dad-tan (オトタン, Ototan) / Rocky Hammerhead
Voiced by: Fumihiko Tachiki (Japanese); Bob Papenbrook (English)
Flint's caveman father who was fossilized alongside his son. When his son was de-fossilized, Rocky ended up as a flat stone rectangle. Dr. Goodman made him into a high-tech stone axe for Flint to use as a weapon. In this form, Rocky has a beam that can fossilize and de-fossilize anything except those with evil minds and can grow for his Hammerhead Rock attack.
Ptera / Puu (プテラ, Putera) / Pterry
Voiced by: Chinami Nishimura (Japanese); Greg Berg (English)
A small robotic Pteranodon that accompanies Flint on his missions. He is responsible for his Memory Beam Erase Mode which erases the events of anyone who meets Flint and his friends, ensuring the timeline is restored to its original state. In the original Japanese version, Ptera is a female.
Rei Jinguji (神宮寺レイ, Jingūji Rei) / Jillian Gray
Voiced by: Mami Nakajima (Japanese); Mari Devon (English)
Exclusive to the anime, Jillian Gray is the chief of the Time Police. She sends Flint on his missions in time to retrieve the Time Shifters. Dr. Bernard Goodman has a crush on her and tries to get her to love him which doesn't work. In the manga, her position is filled by an old man.
Kyoichiro Narugami (鳴神京一郎, Narugami Kyōichirō) / Merlock Holmes
Voiced by: Kappei Yamaguchi (Japanese); Dave Mallow (English)
A member of the Time Police who is descended from vampires and has a crush on Sarah. He is accompanied on his missions by Bindi. His English name is an obvious play on Sherlock Holmes. As he is descended from Vampires, he has above human strength and a high vitality, plus can put someone in a trance. He can also transform due to his Vampire heritage (called "Koumori-Kyoichiro" (蝙蝠京一郎, "Bat-Kyoichiro") in the Japanese dub). Unlike the rest of the cast, he first appears in vol. 2 of the Bros. Comics. In the Bom Bom manga, he is reluctant to become friends with Flint and his friends due to his heritage.
Time-G (トキG, Tokijī) / Old Timer
Voiced by: Katsumi Suzuki (Japanese); Kim Strauss (English)
A Father Time-esque man who handles the Land of Time and watches Flint's adventure while riding a floating pig. Using a cut-out of an old man, he would inform Jillian Gray about a Time Shifter sighting.
Z•Z (ジー•ジー)
He is a Bom Bom Comics exclusive character and part of the Time Police. He was the one in this version of the manga to discover Bubblegum. He also tells Flint and his friends about Merlock.

=== Villains ===
Dark Lord (仮面の方, Kamen no Kata; Masked Man/Yomi G)
Voiced by: Toshiyuki Morikawa (Japanese); Tom Wyner (English)
Petra Fina's boss and one of the main antagonists of the series who resides in the Land of Dread. He is a blue-haired, white-skinned man who wears a mask that made him powerful, faster, and enabled him to pull off magical abilities. The Dark Lord was placed in charge of keeping the souls within the Land of Dread trapped. Eventually, the Dark Lord resented this task as he led a lonely life due to the fact that everything in the Underworld was frozen over. Due to the effects of the Land of Dread, he never grew old and remained a young man. He was the one responsible for scattering the Time Shifters across time following his attack on the Land of Time. He also turned four flowers into his Great Four. In the end, the Dark Lord's true form was revealed after Flint's attack was enough to knock off his mask. After the clock in the Land of Time was restarted, the Dark Lord returned to the Land of Dread.
Hitomi Aino (愛野 瞳, Aino Hitomi), also known as Time Pilfer Lady or T.P. Lady (TPレディ) / Petra Fina Dagmar / Ms. Iknow
Voiced by: Yumi Touma (Japanese); Barbara Goodson, Laura Summer (young) (English)
One of the main antagonists of the series. Petra Fina is an enemy of the Time Police wanted for stealing and messing up time and space. Originally a nice girl who grew up in a rich family, she was getting sick with her control freak mother. She eventually ran off from home and started a life of crime. Petra Fina allied herself with the Dark Lord out of having a "school-girl" infatuation with him. Though she eventually realized too late she was a pawn. Petra Fina and her henchmen travel through time in the Catamaran, a cat-shaped ship that can transform into a giant humanoid cat robot. When not on missions given to her, she takes the form of Ms. Iknow, a strict teacher of Flint, Sarah, and Tony's class. By the finale, she had a temporary truce with the heroes that only lasted until the Dark Lord was defeated. After that, Flint and the other heroes pursue Petra Fina through the timeline.
Mr. Dino / Dino Fishman (ダイナ, Daina)
Voiced by: Yuji Ueda (Japanese); Lex Lang (English)
An experimental eel who was freed from the lab he was in and made humanoid by Petra Fina. Dino serves as one of her lackies. When not on missions, he takes the form of a teacher named Mr. Dino.
Principal Mite / Mite (マイト, Maito)
Voiced by: Chafurin (Japanese); David Lodge (English)
An experimental frog who was freed from the lab he was in and made humanoid by Petra Fina. Mite serves as one of her lackies. When not on missions, he takes the form of Principal Mite.

==== Great Four ====
The Great Four are Dark Lord's own Time-Shifters, created from flowers. Just like the regular Time Shifters, all four can transform, in the Japanese dub this form is called "Super" despite being a form of bad transformation, whereas the English dub changes it to "kon" to match the other Shifters bad transformations. In the finale, the four decided to revert to their original selves on their own.

Super Ninja (ニオージャ, Niōja)
Voiced by: Wataru Takagi (Japanese); Tom Fahn (English)
An Oriental-themed warrior who fights with a staff. He fought Flint on different occasions. Super Ninja default form is of a pin that Dark Lord sent to Petra Fina. He was eventually withdrawn by his master following his defeat in his fight with Mosbee-Master, Coconaut-Master, and Dipper-Master. Super Ninja is patterned after the Nio. In the original Japanese version, he ends his sentences with "-Nyo". Super Ninja is also noted for his habit of talking in first person, when the normal way of addressing oneself in Japanese is in 3rd person. The English dub makes a mistake with his naming and he ends up being the only member to retain the use of "Super" in their transformations name. Additionally, he is also only called ever called "Super Ninja", even though just "Ninja" should be the default name. He also talks in first person in the Japanese dub, rather than in third person, when referring to himself; this is atypical of a Japanese speaker.
Uglinator (デスダス, Desudasu)
Voiced by: Takuma Suzuki (Japanese); Joe Ochman (English)
A skull-type imp (with a chalk-white body, dark blue horns, red eyes and yellow fangs and nails) who first appeared in the form of Petra Fina's Petra-Stamp, which enabled her to turn any Time Shifter into her slave. His presence was soon revealed when he was awakened to replace Super Ninja and take over Petra Fina's group. He can head-butt Time Shifters for Petra Fina to control and can possess people (he once possessed Merlock which turned him into a monstrous version of himself). Uglinator-Con (スーパーデスダス, Sūpā Desudasu) resembles a larger version of himself and can shoot beams in the ground which summons skeletons that obey his every command. In the original Japanese version, he ends his sentences with "-dasu".
Nascal (ナスカル, Nasukaru)
Voiced by: Sachiko Sugawara (Japanese); Joe Ochman (English)
A bird-like creature capable of teleportation, the only female among the Great Four. In the English dub, Nascal was changed to male. Flint had to fight her in order to get into Dark Lord's castle. Nascal-Con resembles a three-headed humanoid condor monster. In the original Japanese version, she ends her sentences with "-ka-ka-ka".
Ominito (ゲラ, Gera)
Voiced by: Mitsuo Iwata (Japanese); Michael Sorich (English)
A mushroom-type creature who uses video game-based attacks to prevent Flint, Dino, and Mite from reaching Petra Fina. In battle, he attacks with mushrooms where one of them had mushrooms that became evil versions of Flint's friends like a Bunny Sarah, a winged Tony, Rocky Hammerhead's Petra-Stamped form, and Merlock Holmes' monster form. Ominito-Con resembles an upside-down mushroom. In the original Japanese version, he ends his sentences with "-Gera".

=== Time Shifters ===
Time Shifters (時空モンスター, Jikū Monsutā; Space-Time Monster, usually shortened as Jikūmon (時空モン)) are creatures that help the Old Timer to run the Land of Time until the Dark Lord came and scattered most of them across time and space. Each one has its own special powers and can transform into Con forms (バッド変化, baddo henka; bad transformation) or Master forms (スーパー変身, sūpā henshin; super transformation). Most of the Time Shifters' Master forms have a humanoid appearance (notable exceptions are Lynx and Unita), whereas their Con forms have a demonic appearance.

Getalong (ラブラブ, Raburabu; "Lovelove")
Voiced by: Mayuko Omimura (Japanese); Mona Marshall (English)
An egg-shaped penguin-type Time Shifter who has a love beam that makes people "get along". Found in the Stone Age where she first met Flint Hammerhead, she becomes a constant companion to Flint and his friends afterwards. Getalong is the only one that has neither Con nor Master forms shown within the anime. Though she did try to transform in one episode. At the end of the series, she was the only Shifter to stay with Flint and the others instead of going back to the Land of Time. She was first introduced in vol. 2 of the original Bros. Comics manga as "Zabieha"(ザビエハ). In this manga, Zabieha was transformed into an evil version of herself.
Jitterbug (ハニハニ, Hanihani; "Honey-Honey")
Voiced by: Philece Sampler
A Dogū-type Time Shifter who can make people dance. Jitterbug-Con (ハニワル, Haniwaru) looks like a ceramic vase-like creature that can eat earthenware, can pull off the Petra-Stomp attack, and shoot them from his mouth. As Jitterbug-Master (スーパーハニハニ, Sūpā Hanihani), he looks more humanoid with big arms and chest and he can perform the Power Whirl attack. Found in 2nd century AD Japan during the reign of Queen Himiko.
Eldora (エルドラ, Erudora)
Voiced by: Melodee Spevack
A winged snake-type Time Shifter who can turn anything to gold. Eldora-Con (ワルドラ, Warudora) is a dragon-like creature protruding from a jewelry box that fires beams. Eldora-Master (スーパーエルドラ, Sūpā Erudora) is a humanoid version of herself with a feathered headdress, and that can fire gold-colored blinding beams. Found in Latin America in the 16th century when the Conquistadors invaded and where Petra Fina got to her first enough to get the Conquistadors on their side. The only character who introduced in this time is Lucas who is the son of one of the Conquistadors.
Talen (テイルン, Teirun)
Voiced by: Laura Summer
A shy fox-like Time Shifter (holding a Fatsia fan) that can enter any story books. Talen-Con (ワルルン, Warurun) takes the form of a pink ball of fur with a fox-like oni mask, had five tails that it stood on and can use them to fire spikes. Talen-Master (スーパーテイルン, Sūpā Teirun) is a yamabushi-themed humanoid fox whose main attack involves throwing exploding necklaces. She was found in Edo-era Japan in 794 AD with Murasaki Shikibu.
Mosbee (モスビー, Mosubī)
Voiced by: Kappei Yamaguchi (Japanese); Brianne Siddall (English)
An elephant head-type Time Shifter that can freeze anything (whatever form he was in). Mosbee-Con (ワルビー, Warubī) is a real woolly mammoth with an up-side down head and has a club attached to his trunk which fires a Petra-Freeze attack. Mosbee-Master (スーパーモスビー, Sūpā Mosubī) is a humanoid mammoth, still with an upside-down head, who can freeze anything from his ears. Mosbee is also the brother of Dipper. He was found in 1812 Russia when Napoleon Bonaparte invaded the country.
Coconaut (ココロン, Kokoron)
Voiced by: Dave Mallow
Coconaut was first introduced in vol.2 of the original manga and appeared in all versions of the series thereafter. A Time-Shifter whose only method of communicating is via telling people if something is right or wrong. He can sense the weather patterns. Coconaut-Con (ワルココロン, Waru Kokoron) which takes the form of an egg-shaped yellow fish with a skull face who can call upon a deadly storm and shoot water from its mouth. Coconaut-Master (スーパーココロン, Sūpā Kokoron) looks more "advanced" with a fish-like water gun for a left arm to perform the Tidal Wave attack. Found by Christopher Columbus in 1492 AD, somewhere in the Atlantic Ocean.
Bubblegum (タネガン, Tanegan)
Voiced by: Doug Erholtz
A Time Shifter that can shoot bubbles. Bubblegum-Con (ワルガン, Warugan) is a hermit crab who can trap people inside his shell and fires a machine-gun like attack. Bubblegum-Master (スーパータネガン, Sūpā Tanegan) is a humanoid robot with machine guns for both arms which he uses to shoot stinging bubbles. His Japanese name is a play on dangan (弾丸; bullet). Found in Edo-era Japan in 1582 with Nobunaga Oda.
Lynx (スフィン, Sufin)
Voiced by: Michael Sorich
A Sphinx-type Time Shifter who's good at riddles. The snake head on Lynx's crown can also talk. Lynx-Con (ワルフィン, Warufin) looks similar to a sarcophagus that can split in half. Lynx-Master (スーパースフィン, Sūpā Sufin) is depicted as a wemic with an Egyptian crown that was only shown as an image in Dr. Goodman's computer. He was found in Ancient Egypt in 323 BC where Petra Fina captured him first and used his power to turn her into a queen.
Artie (ホルルン, Horurun)
Voiced by: Melodee Spevack
A bird-like Time Shifter that can bring drawings to life. Artie-Con (ワルホルルン, Waru Horurun) is a vulture-like creature that has a long, sharp drill-like beak that can Petra-Drill into almost anything. Artie-Master (スーパーホルルン, Sūpā Horurun) is a slender, colorful humanoid bird that can really fly and has super-strength. Found by a young Auguste Rodin.
Batterball (ネッケツ, Nekketsu; "hot-blooded" (熱血))
Voiced by: Derek Stephen Prince
A baseball-themed Time Shifter who looks like a catcher's mitt. He can turn anything into a baseball and can hit fast balls at his opponents, no matter what his form was. Batterball-Con (レイケツ, Reiketsu; "cold-blooded" (冷血)) looks like a four-armed umpire with a left arm for a head and neck who can throw baseballs at very fast speeds. Batterball-Master (スーパーネッケツ, Sūpā Nekketsu) resembles a baseball player who is equipped with a bat that can hit flaming home runs. Found by a young Babe Ruth in his hometown of Baltimore in the year 1906 and helped him out in his baseball training.
Bindi (アンモン, Anmon)
Voiced by: Rika Wakusawa (Japanese); Melissa Fahn (English)
An Ammonite-like Time Shifter that give or take life force. She became Merlock's partner. Bindi has feelings for him, which often take the form of being jealous when he seems to be paying more attention to someone or something else besides her. While she seems self-obsessed, it really comes from a deep-hidden fear of being alone. Bindi-Con (アンコーク, Ankōku; "darkness" (暗黒)) is a hermit crab-like monster that can drain the life force of her enemies and use this advantage to become stronger as well as having an ability to bring things to life like terracotta soldiers at the time when she was captured by Petra Fina. Bindi-Master (スーパーアンモン, Sūpā Anmon) is an angel-like fairy. Found in Transylvania by Vlad III Dracula. At the end of the series, Bindi chooses to remain Merlock's partner instead of returning to the Land of Time. In the Japanese dub, she refers to herself in first person as "Am-Chan", a play on the English word "am".
Elfin (オモチャン, Omochan)
Voiced by: Kim Strauss
A Santa Claus-themed Time Shifter who can turn anything into a toy. Elfin-Con (ワルチャン, Waruchan) took on a form of a centauroid reindeer with a skull-like head where it can summon large war-like toys like possessed carousel horses and runaway Ferris wheels. Elfin-Master (スーパーオモチャン, Sūpā Omochan) is a "super-powered" version of himself who is only shown on Dr. Goodman's computer. Found in 1651 in Paris, France during the Christmas season.
Cardians (レッドマン, Reddoman; "Redman")
Blademan Voiced by: Bob Papenbrook
Thud Voiced by: Richard Cansino
Arrowman Voiced by: Greg Berg
Snapper Voiced by: Rika Wakusawa (Japanese); Mona Marshall (English)
A group of playing card-themed Time Shifters made up of Blademan the Swordsman (spade, red), Thud the All-Powerful (clover, green), Arrowman the Archer (diamond, blue), and Snapper the Camera Whiz (heart, pink). They are modeled on The Three Musketeers and J.A.K.Q. Dengekitai. The four can merge while transforming into their powered forms. Cardian-Con (アクマン, Akuman) is a centipede monster that looks similar to a jester-like Grim Reaper with the four faces on its different segments. Though this form is vulnerable to being separated by being attacked in its different segments. Cardian-Master (スーパーレッドマン, Sūpā Reddoman) on the other hand is a knight equipped with a sword and shield. Found in 2000 during Dr. Goodman's teenage time in Tokyo.
Plumella (モナリス, Monarisu)
Voiced by: Tifanie Christun
Plumella was originally introduced in vol.1 of the Bros. comics manga, but her appearance was changed in later versions. She is a squirrel-like Time Shifter that can trap anyone in their self-portraits. Plumella-Con (ワルリス, Warurisu) has large hands for ears where she cannot only use the Petra-Bash, but she can also trap her opponents in paint goo. Her Japanese name is a play on the Mona Lisa painting and risu (栗鼠; squirrel). She was found in the time of Leonardo da Vinci (just before he begins painting the Mona Lisa) and was captured by Petra Fina first in order to paint a portrait of her.
Wing (ウィング, Wingu)
Voiced by: Anna Garduno
A propeller monoplane/bird-like Time Shifter that can put wings on anyone. Wing-Con (ワルイング, Waruingu) is a vulture-like flying fortress that attacks with flying propellers and darts. As Wing-Master (ジェットン, Jetton), he becomes similar to a jet aircraft flying at great speeds and can be ridden by anyone. He was found in the care of the young Wright brothers.
Moah (モアイワ, Moaiwa)
A Moai-type Time Shifter who is the biggest of the Time Shifters. Moah-Con (ワルイワ, Waruiwa) is a giant, floating Moai statue with hands which shoot magma and can even cause volcanic eruptions. As Petra Fina could not get the Petra-Stamp on Moah to assume this form, she had Dino and Mite fire the Petra-Stamp Missile from the Catamaran to do the job. Moah-Master (スーパーモアイワ, Sūpā Moaiwa) is a giant humanoid rock warrior who can summon the giant stone "Moai" by jumping on the ground to prevent a tidal wave using a seawall of Moai statues. He was found in the Pacific on what is now Easter Island.
Elekin (エレキン, Elekin)
Voiced by: Derek Stephen Prince
An Elekiter-type Time Shifter with power over electricity. Elekin-Con (ワルキン, Warukin) can attack with electric shocks. Elekin-Master (スーパーエレキン, Sūpā Erekin) is bigger than his normal self (save for the addition of two arms and two legs like a real human) which looks like and is modeled on giant robots like Voltes V and Daimos. He was found in Edo-era Japan with Hiraga Gennai.
Muscles (マスルン, Masurun)
A Time Shifter that can make anyone strong by simply touching them. He looks similar to a dumbbell in his normal form. Muscles-Con (ワルスル, Warusuru) is black and spiky and can attack people (especially Flint) with heavy, metallic balls and tie people up with ropes. The gladiator-like Muscles-Master (スーパーマスルン, Sūpā Masurun) has enormous strength. He was found in Ancient Greece in the year 4 BC with a runner named Damon.
Unita (ユニータ, Yunīta)
Voiced by: Joshua Seth
A telepathic Time Shifter that looks like a winged unicorn. As Old Timer's aid, he travels through time and space without any mechanical assistance. He is mostly shown in the form of Unita-Master (スーパーユニータ, Sūpā Yunīta) which is a white flying unicorn. Unita-Con (ワルファー, Warufā) is a black flying unicorn with a fiery mane and wings that can breathe fire. He was found in the Grand Canyon in an unknown period.
Raldo (ラルド, Rarudo)
Voiced by: Asami Nakajima (Japanese); Richard Cansino (English)
A turtle-like Time Shifter that can trap anyone in his shell. Raldo-Con (ワルラルド, Waru Rarudo) can shoot crystal spikes from his shell and can turn into a large rolling ball of crystal spikes. Raldo can also transform into Raldo-Master (スーパーラルド, Sūpā Rarudo) who resembles a humanoid turtle knight who can freeze any enemy with his Raldo-Freeze. He was found in the time of Petra Fina's childhood and was her best friend.
Leafy (リーフィー, Rīfī)
Voiced by: Tom Fahn
A Time Shifter that has power over plants. Leafy-Con (ワルリュー, Waruryū) is a rose-themed dragon with dragon-like heads for hands who can breathe fire and her head is hard like diamonds as seen when she was unfazed by Rocky's attacks. She also can turn into Leafy-Master (スーパーリーフィー, Sūpā Rīfī) which looks like a pink humanoid flower and attacks with pollen. Found in the time of young King Arthur. In the Japanese version, Leafy was a female. In the English dub, Leafy is a male.
Monk (ボウザン, Bouzan)
Voiced by: Brian Donovan
A Time Shifter that collects weapons (especially the naginata and the backsword) and is an expert samurai. As the metallic, multi-armed Monk-Con (ワルザン, Waruzan), he can shoot spikes from his body and relies too much on weapons which is one of his weaknesses. He resembles a modern version of samurai in his Monk-Master (スーパーブーザン, Sūpā Bouzan) form as seen in his unused artwork. He helped Saito Musashibo Benkei.
Nightcap (グースー, Gūsū)
A tapir-type Time Shifter that helps people sleep. Nightcap-Con (ワルグースー, Waru Gūsū) uses an ability that can confuse his opponents enough to causes Flint and Talen-Master to fight each other. His Monk-Con form is dark and has a bell for a snout. His Nightcap-Master (スーパー姑蘇, Sūpā Gūsū) form is more humanoid and wears a cape as seen in his unused artwork. He was found by the famous author Hans Christian Andersen who used Nightcap to sleep and his characters in his dreams helped Flint and Talen-Master to break free from Nightcap-Con's spell.
Musey (ミュージー, Myūjī)
Voiced by: Wendee Lee
A Time Shifter who resembles an eighth note symbol with a mouth of a bugle that can recognize beautiful music and can use it to overpower any person's emotions. Musey-Con (ワルミュージー, Waru Myūjī) is a frog-like creature equipped with a pipe organ, using ultrasonic attacks. Musey-Master (スーパーミュージー, Sūpā Myūjī) looks similar to a conductor that can wrap his enemies in sheet music. Found in the time of Wolfgang Amadeus Mozart and a young Ludwig van Beethoven.
Change (コゼニー, Kozenī)
Voiced by: Steve Blum
A Time Shifter that looks like a walking purse. He can hypnotize people using the persuasion of wealth and can make real money by eating takoyaki. Change-Con (ワルゼニー, Waruzenī) is a Dimetrodon/purse monster which is bigger and has spikes all over his body where it can shoot gold bullions as an attack. His Change-Master (スーパーコゼニー, Sūpā Kozenī) form looks like a sultan covered in gold as seen in his unused artwork. Found in Edo-era Japan with Kinokuniya Bunzaemon.
Bugsy (ムッシュー, Musshū)
A caterpillar-type Time Shifter that can turn anyone into an insect by looking at them through his magnifying glass. Bugsy-Con (ワルムッシュー, Waru Musshū) is a moth/mantis-like creature that attacks with sickle-like arms and a morphing ray that it shoots from its mouth. His Bugsy-Master (スーパームシュウ, Sūpā Musshū) form resembles an insectoid as seen in his unused artwork. Found in the period of a young Jean Henri Fabre.
Dipper (ジャバ, Jaba)
Voiced by: Wendee Lee
An elephant-type Time Shifter and brother of Mosbee. He can locate water. As Dipper-Con (ワルムジャバ, Waru Jaba), he can shoot fire from his trunk. As Dipper-Master (スーパージャバ, Sūpā Jaba), he shoots fire from his hands. Both of Dipper's evolved forms bear some resemblance to his brother's. Found by Marco Polo.
Knuckle (ナックル, Nakkuru)
Voiced by: Kirk Thornton
A Chinese dragon-like Time Shifter who's an expert of mystic martial arts whom can discharge shockwaves from his fists. Knuckle also makes for a great kenpo master where he and anyone he trains can perform a powerful remote punch attacks. One of the most powerful Time Shifters even when he becomes Knuckle-Con (ワルナックル, Waru Nakkuru), where he resembles a blue red-eyed Chinese dragon and has the strength enough to defeat Musey-Master. His Knuckle-Master (スーパーナクル, Sūpā Nakkuru) form is a Chinese dragonoid with four arms and a nunchaku as seen in his unused artwork. Found in Hong Kong in 1972 by a man named Lee. Knuckle could be a reference to the film Enter the Dragon, while his owner could be a reference to actor Bruce Lee.
Doron (ドロン)
Voiced by: Brianne Siddall
A Time Shifter that looks like a pumpkin-headed ghost. He can scare people by spitting out luminous spooks. Doron-Con (バッドロン, Baddoron) is a gigantic pumpkin with ivy branches for arms and legs and attacks with throwing axes. His Doron-Master (スーパードロン, Sūpā Doron) form dresses like a witch, has bat wings, and holds a staff with blue fire on top that gives it the appearance of a broom as seen in unused artwork. Found in the time of Thomas Edison.
Shadow (カゲニン, Kagenin)
A fox-like Time Shifter who can make shadow clones of anyone. When he is under Petra's control, Shadow-Con (ワルカゲ, Warukage) has a black face and blazing fire on its head, and attacks with shurikens and creates evil shadow doubles. His Shadow-Master (スーパーカゲニン, Sūpā Kagenin) form looks like his Shadow-Con form, but with a kinder face and more robotic look as seen in unused artwork. Found by a cowardly Miyamoto Musashi.
Orbit (コメット, Kometto)
Voiced by: Wendee Lee
A star-type Time Shifter who has the power of encouragement. Orbit is the only missing Time Shifter not to be found in any time period as Flint, Dino, and Mite came across her while on a mission to rescue Petra Fina from Dark Lord. Orbit-Con (ワルコメット, Waru Kometto) has a tank-like bottom with cannons that can break through walls. Orbit-Master (スーパーコメット, Sūpā Kometto) is a humanoid version of herself that controls light.
Wolfen (ウルフェン, Wolfen)
A wolf-type Time Shifter who only appears in the Bom Bom comics promo manga. He can walk on air and is fond of Getalong. Wolfen also wears a collar around his neck which the Old Timer can contact him through. Wolfen-Con is a demon wolf that shoots a tornado blast from his mouth. Wolfen-Master is a werewolf swordsman who is swift and fast where he can also use his sword like a boomerang.
Haniwani (はにワニ)
A crocodile-like Time Shfiter that appeared in the original Bros. Comics in vol.1. He is able to eat anything and was the very first Time Shifter introduced in the series. Haniwani is often depicted as chewing on things, even clothes and people.
Hanasaka (ハナサカ)
A Time Shifter who first appeared in the original manga in vol.1. Hanasaka has the appearance of a dead tree stump. His powers are identical to Leafy's.
Funga (フンガー)
A Time Shifter who first appeared in the original manga in vol.2. His appearance is of a giant stone imp-like creature carrying a large tray on his head.
Dollymon (ドリーモン, Dorimon)
Appeared in the Sanrio Puroland "Dream Time Machine" (夢のタイムマシン) cinema as an exclusive special only to the theme park.

== Episodes ==
No.	Title	Original release date	English air date
1	"Hammerhead Rock"; Transliteration: "Ishi Ishi Uhhō!" (Japanese: イシイシウッホー!)	1 October 1998	5 March 2000
The first episode of the series where Petra Fina and the gang arrived from the Stone Age year and tries to capture the first Time Shifter named Getalong, and there they meet the prehistoric caveboy named Flint Hammerhead and his father Rocky Hammerhead (in human form). She fossilizes them with her fossilizing gun to preserve them as their fossilized appearances are buried in lava. Years later, their fossils are found by Sarah and Tony Goodman. While Flint and Getalong are defossilized by their uncle Dr. Bernard Goodman, a side-effect of the fossilization has left Rocky as a sentient stone slab with eyes. As Dr. Goodman is unable to restore Rocky to normal, he makes him into a high-tech stone axe that comes in handy when Petra Fina comes to claim Getalong.
2	"Jitterbug"; Transliteration: "Yamataikoku de Hanihani?" (Japanese: 邪馬台国でハニハニ?)	8 October 1998	5 March 2000
This is the first mission of Flint, Sarah and Tony as time detectives. The team are sent back to the 2nd century A.D. Japan to retrieve and rescue the Time Shifter Jitterbug. On arrival, the group help Queen Himiko of Yamatai and her sister Nashimi to restore order after Petra Fina and her gang overthrew them and took them as prisoners.
3	"Eldora"; Transliteration: "Ōgontoshi ha Kinkirakīn!" (Japanese: 黄金都市はキンキラキーン!)	15 October 1998	12 March 2000
The team heads back to 16th century South America in order to rescue the Time Shifter Eldora. Upon arriving, they are captured by Spanish Conquistadors and end up as prisoners where they try to extract the location of the Golden Condor from them. In help of the leader's only son named Lucas, they escape and aim to help a group of ancient Incas to return to their village and to prevent further attacks from the Conquistador who are revealed to be acting under Petra Fina's orders.
4	"Talen"; Transliteration: "Kaguya-hime Gamatsu Teirun" (Japanese: かぐや姫がまっテイルン?)	22 October 1998	12 March 2000
The team is sent back to the Heian Period of Japan (794 A.D.) in search of the Time Shifter Talen. After confronting the villains, Petra Fina and Flint are dragged into the tale of Princess Kaguya as Talen attempts to escape. Within the story, Flint befriends Talen (who disguises herself as the titular Princess Kaguya) and all three eventually escape the story. Petra Fina subsequently captures Talen and Flint must fight to rescue his new friend.
5	"Mosbee"; Transliteration: "Hiehie Mosubī" (Japanese: ひえひえモスビー)	29 October 1998	19 March 2000
The team is sent back to Russia in 1812 to search for the Time Shifter Mosbee. There they encounter the invading forces of the First French Empire under Napoleon Bonaparte during his planned invasion of Russia, as well as Mosbee in his ice castle. Mosbee ends up being brainwashed by Petra Fina. Petra Fina secures the loyalty of Napoleon and his forces after using Mosbee-Con to freeze their Russian opponents. Flint must fight Mosbee-Con and restore order. A mysterious character also makes a first appearance to help Flint. Upon Mosbee being free, Napoleon decides that Russia is too cold to invade and has his forces retreat back to France.
6	"Coconaut"; Transliteration: "Shintairiku ha Kokoron" (Japanese: 新大陸はココロン)	5 November 1998	19 March 2000
The team goes back to the year 1492 to look for the Time Shifter Coconaut, where they find themselves pressed into service for the famous explorer Christopher Columbus upon being fished out of the ocean by his crew. Coconaut is revealed to be assisting Columbus in his navigation. Petra Fina uses this fact to inspire distrust for Columbus amongst the crew. This leads to Petra Fina starting a mutiny, stealing Coconaut, and taking command of the fleet where she plans to rename America as Petra-Merica. After escaping from abandonment on a desert island, Flint and his friends rush to set things straight and free Coconaut.
7	"Bubblegum"; Transliteration: "Tanegan de Tenkatori" (Japanese: タネガンで天下取り)	12 November 1998	26 March 2000
Travelling back to Japan in 1582 (during the Azuchi-Momoyama Period) in search of the Time Shifter Bubblegum, the team arrives at Azuchi Castle, where they find Bubblegum in the companionship of Oda Nobunaga and his attendant Mori Ranmaru (who is portrayed as being female in the series). When Petra Fina and her gang attack the castle and brainwash Bubblegum, the heroes and Nobunaga are subdued in battle only to be rescued by Ranmaru and Coconaut-Master. Together the group fights Bubblegum-Con to thwart Petra Fina's plan.
8	"Lynx"; Transliteration: "Sufin no Nazonazo?" (Japanese: スフィンのなぞなぞ?)	19 November 1998	26 March 2000
The team is sent back to Ancient Egypt (323 B.C.) to search for the Time Shifter Lynx. On arriving, the group find Lynx under the command of Petra Fina who styles herself as an Egyptian Queen. When Flint is brainwashed by Lynx, Tony and Sarah engage Lynx in a game of riddles and beat him by using the Riddle of the Sphinx, breaking Petra Fina's spell. With the aid of Bubblegum-Master, Flint confronts Lynx-Con.
9	"Artie"; Transliteration: "Rakugaki Horurun" (Japanese: らくがきホルルン)	26 November 1998	1 April 2000
The team is sent back to mid 19th century Paris in France to search for the Time Shifter Artie. At the same time, Petra Fina receives a portrait of the Dark Lord. On arriving they find Artie in the company of a young Auguste Rodin, who has been using Artie's powers to animate his drawings. When Petra Fina and her gang arrive and brainwash Artie, Flint (with the peculiar "help" of Lynx) takes on Artie-Con.
10	"Go Getalong"; Transliteration: "Raburabu Rapusodī" (Japanese: ラブラブラプソディー)	3 December 1998	8 April 2000
Plotting to capture Getalong from the Time Detectives and use her power to be married to the Dark Lord, Petra Fina and her henchman set up a trap for Flint, Sarah and Tony in Baghdad in the year 1539, misleading them into searching for a Time Shifter. There they are caught, but end up engaging in battle with the cat form of Petra Fina's Catamaran, which is defeated with the help of Getalong.
11	"Batterball"; Transliteration: "Moero! Nekketsu" (Japanese: 燃えろ!ネッケツ)	10 December 1998	15 April 2000
The time detective team travelled back in the year 1956, where they encounter the Time Shifter Batterball and the young, rude, and cunning baseball player name Babe Ruth wherein he always uses Batterball for his prank plan on his bullies much to Tony's disappointment and confronts him to challenge to a real baseball game together with the troublemakers (which is Petra Fina and his henchmen).
12	"Bindi"; Transliteration: "Anmon tte Nanimon?" (Japanese: アンモンってナニモン?)	17 December 1998	22 April 2000
The Time Detectives had to go back to 15th century in Transylvania to retrieve another Time Shifter named "Bindi" which she is in the possession of Count Vlad Dracula or just simply Count Dracula which his fellow people in his villagers believed that he is actually a vampire. Upon meeting with Vlad Dracula, the mysterious guy who helped Sara in some episodes reveals his identity as Merlock Holmes of the Time Bureau and assigned as undercover detective to observe Flint Hammerhead in his missions. In the end of this episode, Bindi choose to side with Merlock because of her faith to him and also because Flint already sees that she wants to go with Merlock rather than their team.
13	"Caveman's Christmas"; Transliteration: "Omochan no Kurisumasu" (Japanese: オモチャンのクリスマス)	24 December 1998	17 December 2000
This is the only episode that Flint and the team travelled back in time not just one, but two. It started on Christmas Day where they will also meet a lonely young girl named Maria in ancient France in hopes of finding her missing mother and that is with the help of her own-believed angel which is the Time Shifter named Elfin (which he has an ability to turn anything into a toy). As Flint works to prevent the death of Maria's mother, they also must deal with Petra Fina even when she transforms Elfin to Elfin-Con. They defeat him with the help of Batterball-Master. Afterwards, Jillian Grey stated that tampering with history is illegal. Though she will overlook it.
14	"Miss Iknow Makes a House Call"; Transliteration: "Hōmon Redi ha TP Redi" (Japanese: 訪問レディはTPレディ?)	31 December 1998	29 April 2000
In the forms of Ms. Iknow, Mr. Dino, and Principal Mite during this clip show, Petra Fina, Dino, and Mite try to convince Dr. Goodman that the Time Shifters would not be good at home with him. Meanwhile, Merlock meets with Jillian Gray.
15	"The Cardians"; Transliteration: "Hīrō ha Reddoman" (Japanese: ヒーローはレッドマン)	7 January 1999	6 May 2000
The time detectives had to go back in the year 2000, where they have to find the group of Time Shifters named The Cardians. But upon reaching the timeline, Sara and Tony surprised that the time they've gone to is the time when their uncle Dr. Goodman is a teenager and likes to smoke a lot and that explains why he doesn't have a girlfriend up to now. While witnessing the heroic deeds of the Cardians, Flint also must deal with Petra Fina when she takes control of the Cardians. After being freed by Flint, the Cardians form Cardian-Master to fight with the cat form of Petra Fina's Catamaran.
16	"Plumella"; Transliteration: "Monarisu no Hohoemi" (Japanese: モナリスのほほえみ)	14 January 1999	13 May 2000
During the Rennaisance Period, Petra Fina has captured the Time Shifter Plumella and then proceeds to capture Leonardo da Vinci to paint a portrait of her.
17	"Wing"; Transliteration: "Tobe! Tobe! Wingu" (Japanese: とべ!とべ!ウイング)	21 January 1999	20 May 2000
Sarah and Tony end up in an argument which goes through their mission to find the Time Shifter Wing as the younger Wright brothers are also in an argument.
18	"Bindi-Master"; Transliteration: "Sūpābijo Anmon" (Japanese: スーパー美女・アンモン)	28 January 1999	3 June 2000
After Bindi runs away from Merlock upon being neglected, Petra Fina captures Bindi and manages to get Bindi under her control. Now Merlock and Flint must rescue Bindi from Petra Fina's control.
19	"Moah"; Transliteration: "Daimajin Moaiwa" (Japanese: 大魔神モアイワ)	4 February 1999	10 June 2000
Upon arriving on what will be Easter Island, Flint's group finds the Time Shifter Moah helping the native children. When Petra Fina arrives and Flint fights off her attempts to Petra Stamp Moah, Petra Fina has Dino and Mite fire the Petra Stamp Missile which turns Moah into Moah-Con where he causes a volcanic eruption enough for Mosbee to be called in. After Moah is freed and Petra Fina is defeated, a tidal wave threatens the island which leads to Moah becoming Moah-Master where he jumps down on the ground enough to bring up the Moai that intercept the tidal wave.
20	"Elekin"; Transliteration: "Erekin no Sūpā Robotto Taiketsu" (Japanese: エレキンのスーパーロボット対決)	11 February 1999	17 June 2000
21	"Muscles"; Transliteration: "Orinpikku ni Shutsu Masurun?" (Japanese: オリンピックに出マスルン?)	18 February 1999	24 June 2000
Ms. Iknow has been making her students due many laps during gym class until Pterry arrives telling Flint that a Time Shifter has been sighted in Ancient Greece within the year 4 BC. Ms. Iknow uses this cover to leave and change into Petra Fina while Flint's group heads to 4 BC. Upon arrival, they find the Time Shifter Muscle helping a struggling athlete named Damon.
22	"Rocky in Love"; Transliteration: "Gekitotsu! Genshi VS Ototan" (Japanese: 激突!ゲンシVSオトタン)	25 February 1999	1 July 2000
It's Sunday, the Goodman residence had a general clean up for their homes, all of the Time Shifters helped them (except Moah which he is really big). Petra-Fina in the form of Ms. Iknow plans to capture the time shifters from Dr. Goodman's possession in order to give all of them to Dark Lord, by using or dating Flint's dad Rocky Hammerhead. After Flint and his friends realized that his dad is gone, they had to go to the city to go and look for him. Meanwhile, Merlock and Bindi sees Rocky that he is dating with Ms. Iknow, so he had to tell to Sara that Rocky and Ms. IKnow are dating only and they have to watch them secretly to find out if Ms. Iknow has feelings to Flint's dad or just using him as her guinea pig.
23	"Enter the Unicorn"; Transliteration: "Toki no Kuni no Yunīta" (Japanese: 時の国のユニータ)	4 March 1999	8 July 2000
Flint, Sarah, and Tony arrive in the Grand Canyon when pursuing the time-traveling Time Shifter Unita-Master. A fight between Flint and Petra Fina's group lands them in the Land of Time where Flint has his first encounter with the Old Timer and how the Time Shifters were scattered throughout time by the Dark Lord during an earlier attack on the Land of Time.
24	"Raldo"; Transliteration: "TP Redi no Baddo Henka?" (Japanese: TPレディのバッド変化?)	11 March 1999	15 July 2000
After being lost in time following the incident in the last episode, Petra Fina, Dino, and Mite are apprehended by the Time Police. When Petra Fina, Dino, and Mite make an escape during interrogation, Dino and Mite capture Dr. Goodman as Petra Fina receives an assignment from Dark Lord to search for the Time Shifter Raldo. The time period that Raldo is in happens to be Petra Fina's childhood.
25	"Leafy"; Transliteration: "Rīfī no Mahō no Mori" (Japanese: リーフィーの魔法の森)	18 March 1999	22 July 2000
Flint's group arrives in the Medieval Ages where they meet the child form of King Arthur who has befriended the Time Shifter Leafy. Because of Arthur's cowardice, Petra Fina manages to get control of Leafy.
26	"Monk"; Transliteration: "Ubawareta Ototan" (Japanese: うばわれたオトタン)	25 March 1999	29 July 2000
During a mission to get the Time Shifter Monk, they find him in the company of Saito Musashibo Benkei where they steal Rocky from Flint. While working to get his father back from Monk and Benkei, Flint must also contend with Petra Fina when she takes control of Monk.
27	"Nightcap"; Transliteration: "Anderusen no Gūsū Monogatari?" (Japanese: アンデルセンのグースー物語?)	1 April 1999	6 August 2000
Flint's group and Talen finds the Time Shifter Nightcap in the possession of Hans Christian Andersen who is using him to fall asleep. When Petra Fina arrives with Dark Lord's minion Super Ninja, everyone is dragged into Hans Christian Andersen's dreams where they encounter Hans Christian Andersen's creations like The Little Match Girl, The Snow Queen, and The Ugly Duckling.
28	"Musey"; Transliteration: "Unmei no Myūjī" (Japanese: 運命のミュージー)	8 April 1999	20 August 2000
Flint's group finds the Time Shifter Musey helping Wolfgang Amadeus Mozart and also meet a younger Beethoven who is struggling to master the art of music. Thanks to Super Ninja, Petra Fina gets control of Musey as Muscles-Master helps Flint to fight him. With advice from Sarah, Beethoven plays his music enough to free Musey. Once Musey is claimed by Flint, Old Timer notices Mozart and Beethoven in the same area and will fix that later.
29	"Change"; Transliteration: "Kozenī de mō karimakka?" (Japanese: コゼニーでもうかりまっか?)	15 April 1999	25 August 2000
30	"Snug as a Bug"; Transliteration: "Mushimushi Musshū" (Japanese: むしむしムッシュー)	22 April 1999	1 September 2000
Flint, Sarah, and Tony go on a mission to claim the Time Shifter Bugsy who can turn anyone he sees through his magnifying glass into insects. Unfortunately, Sarah is afraid of insects. When Flint, Sarah, and Tony are turned into insects, they encounter the insect form of Jean Henri Fabre.
31	"Dipper"; Transliteration: "Arashi wo Yobu Jaba!" (Japanese: 嵐を呼ぶジャバ!)	29 April 1999	8 September 2000
Lost in the desert, Flint's group finds some water and are attacked by angry travelers until the intervention of Marco Polo and the water-finding Time Shifter named Dipper stops them. Petra Fina later lies to Marco Polo about the motives of Flint's group which leads to an arena fight between Flint and Super Ninja alongside Dipper-Con. When Dipper is freed and is reunited with his brother Mosbee, he as Dipper-Master assists Mosbee-Master and Coconaut-Master in sending Super Ninja flying. As Marco Polo is reunited with his family, Dark Lord finds a defeated Super Ninja in the desert and recalls him back to the Land of Dread to recuperate while sending another one of his minions to work with Petra Fina. Petra Fina finds her Petra Stamp turning into Uglinator.
32	"Uglinator"; Transliteration: "Kyōchirō no Baddo Henka!" (Japanese: 京一郎のバッド変化!)	6 May 1999	15 September 2000
Dark Lord sends Uglinator in the form of the Petra Stamp to Petra Fina in order to make up for Super Ninja's defeat. Uglinator takes control of a school full of children in order to capture Flint and Merlock so that they can fight for his entertainment.
33	"Knuckle"; Transliteration: "Moeyo Nakkuru Ikari no Tekken" (Japanese: 燃えよナックル怒りの鉄拳)	13 May 1999	22 September 2000
34	"Doron"; Transliteration: "Doron to Hatsumeiō" (Japanese: ドロンと発明王)	20 May 1999	29 September 2000
35	"Shadow"; Transliteration: "Musashi tai Kagenin" (Japanese: 武蔵対カゲニン)	27 May 1999	6 October 2000
36	"The Land of Dread"; Transliteration: "Yomi no Kuni no Nasukaru" (Japanese: ヨミの国のナスカル)	3 June 1999	15 October 2000
Dino and Mite come to Flint for help when Dark Lord has imprisoned Petra Fina for her final failure to obtain the Time Shifters. While traveling to the Land of Dread, Flint finds the Time Shifter Orbit while Pterri and Getalong get lost in the timestream. As Flint fights the Great Four member Nascal in his maze, Dark Lord sends Uglinator to take control of Orbit in order to help Nascal-Con.
37	"Game Master"; Transliteration: "Gēmu Masutā Gera" (Japanese: ゲームマスター・ゲラ)	10 June 1999	22 October 2000
After successfully defeated Nascal of the Great Four in order to gain entrance from the Land of Dread, Flint, Pterri, Getalong, Unita, Orbit, Dino, and Mite will face more troubles and traps laid by the Great Four member Ominito especially facing his own friends (in evil look form) Sarah's rabbit girl form, Tony with wings, Merlock's Uglinator-induced form, and his own father when he was controlled by the Petra Stamp. Meanwhile, Merlock is on his way attempting to follow Flint and the others to assist them, even though, he was landed on the wrong side of the dimension which happens to be the ladies dome.
38	"The Rescue"; Transliteration: "Jikan no Kuni no Daikessen!" (Japanese: 時間の国の大決戦!)	17 June 1999	29 October 2000
Right after Flint and the others have been defeated, captured, and imprisoned by the Dark Lord, it's up to Dr. Goodman, Sara, and Tony to rescue them even if they face more disaster, danger and traps laid and prepared by the Dark Lord that involves using his magic to turn most of the Time Shifters into their Con forms without the use of the Petra Stamp and/or Uglinator's effects.
39	"Time of Darkness"; Transliteration: "Jikū no Kanata He" (Japanese: 時空の彼方へ)	24 June 1999	5 November 2000
Picked-up from the last episode, Flint had to face more danger and have to defend the world from Dark Lord's reign, and to defend the darkness, grieve, and evil to lurks from every man and woman in the world. Will Flint and his friends succeed to do this? Or he will fail?

== English adaptation ==
Saban Entertainment licensed & did the English adaptation for Flint, which is very different from the original Japanese version.

All the original Japanese music score is replaced with a new American-made soundtrack; all the sound effects are changed as well. The series was Americanized, with characters names and some places being altered, Flint explains in episode 6 that they come from the USA instead of Japan. Many characters, such as Pterry, changed genders. Parts of each episode were cut and some filler scenes were added. Art edits were only minor, with Dr. Bernard Goodman's lab receiving one of the few noticeable changes.

== Manga ==
=== Bros. Comics ===
The original manga was released over the course of 3 volumes. It features many prototype ideas and concepts that never featured in the anime.

=== Bom Bom comics ===
A 6 chapter manga was produced as a promotion for the anime. It features a slightly different approach to the storyline.

- Chapter 1: Old Timer is attacked by Petra under the command of the Dark Lord. She is attacked by Wolfen who has transformed into his master form. As he attacks, Petra stamps him which cancels out his master form and transforms him into his kon form. Later due to Flint's interference, Wolfen-kon attacks Flint. Petra is beaten by Flint and in turn fossilizes him, his father and Getalong. Petra drops the fossil-gun in the process.
- Chapter 2: In the fall out of the attack, Bubblegun appears. Flint rescues him after defeating his kon form.
- Chapter 3: This chapter features Flint rescuing Jitterbug.
- Chapter 4: Talen is the focus as Petra begins to rewrite the stories of Hans Christian Andersen.
- Chapter 5: Time Detective Merlock encounters Coconuat who lands on a ship. When Flint appears, Merlock rejects any attempts that Flint makes to befriend him due to the way Vampires are prosecuted by humans, making Flint feel bad for Merlock. Petra stamps Coconuat who transforms into Coconuat form. During the attack by Coconuat-kon, Merlock is knocked out. The chapter ends with Coconuat being defeated and Merlock taking note of his new friends.
- Chapter 6: Batterball is the focus of the chapter. The chapter ends with the final pages taking about the upcoming anime. The characters are shown holding scripts.

== Openings and endings ==
=== Openings ===
1. Power Nakimochi (パワーなきもち, Pawā nakimochi; The Power of Feelings)

=== Endings ===
1. Moshimo... (もしも…; If...) (ep. 1–13)
2. Kirakira (きらきら; Glitter) (ep. 14–26)
3. Boku no Shirushi (僕のシルシ; My Sign) (ep. 27–38)
4. Jikū no Kanata e (時空の彼方へ; Beyond the Time and Space) (ep. 39)

== Cast ==
=== Japanese cast ===
- Yukiji as Genshi-kun
- Nana Mizuki as Sora Yamato
- Chiaki Morita as Tokio Yamato
- Chinami Nishimura as Puu-chan
- Katsumi Suzuki as Time-G
- Kappei Yamaguchi as Kyoichiro Narugami
- Yumi Touma as T.P. Lady/Hitomi Aino
- Toshiyuki Morikawa as Masked Man/Dark Lord
- Wataru Takagi as Nioja
- Sachiko Sugawara as Nascal
- Mitsuo Iwata as Gera
- Takuma Suzuki as Desudasu

=== English cast ===
- R. Martin Klein - Flint Hammerhead
- Bob Papenbrook - Rocky Hammerhead, Blademan of The Cardians
- Greg Berg - Pterry, Arrowman of the Cardians
- Steve Blum - Change, Hans Christian Andersen (ep. 27)
- Richard Cansino - Bernard Goodman, Thud of the Cardians, Raldo
- Tifanie Christun - Sarah Goodman, Plumella
- Brian Donovan - Tony Goodman, Monk
- Mari Devon - Jillian Gray
- Doug Erholtz - Merlock Holmes, Bubblegum, Lucas (ep. 3), Auguste Rodin (ep. 9)
- Melissa Fahn - Bindi
- Tom Fahn - Leafy, Hiraga Gennai (ep. 20), Super Ninja
- Anna Garduno - Wing
- Barbara Goodson - Petra Fina Dagmar/Ms. Iknow
- Lex Lang - Dino/Mr. Dino
- David Lodge - Mite/Principal Mite
- Wendee Lee - Dipper, Orbit, Nashimi (ep. 2)
- Dave Mallow - Coconaut
- Mona Marshall - Getalong, Snapper of The Cardians
- Joe Ochman - Nascal, Uglinator
- Derek Stephen Prince - Batterball, Elekin, Young Orville Wright (ep. 17), Jean Henri Fabre (ep. 30)
- Philece Sampler - Jitterbug, Queen Himiko (ep. 2)
- Joshua Seth - Unita (Basic Form)
- Brianne Siddall - Mosbee, Doron
- Michael Sorich - Lynx, Ominito, Young Babe Ruth (ep. 11)
- Melodee Spevack - Eldora, Artie
- Kim Strauss - The Old Timer, Elfin
- Laura Summer - Talen, Young Petra Fina (ep. 24)
- Kirk Thornton - Knuckle
- Tom Wyner - Dark Lord

==== Additional voices ====
- Michael Lindsay - Young Wilbur Right (ep. 17), Thomas Edison (ep. 34)
- Peggy O'Neal -
- Colleen O'Shaughnessey - Murasaki Shikibu (ep. 4)
- Michael Reisz - Bruce Lee (ep. 33)
- Dave Wittenberg - Young King Arthur (ep. 25), Marco Polo (ep. 31)

== Crew ==
=== English Crew ===
- Richard Epcar - Voice Director
- Mary Elizabeth McGlynn - Voice Director
- Michael Sorich - Voice Director
