= List of Beyblade characters =

This list includes characters from the original Beyblade series.

== Main characters ==
Tyson Granger (木ノ宮 タカオ, Kinomiya Takao)
Voiced by: Motoko Kumai (Japanese); Marlowe Gardiner-Heslin (English)
The main protagonist of Beyblade series. Master of sacred bit-beast Dragoon. He is the Japanese leader and protector of the Bladebreakers, BBA Revolution and G Revolutions.
Kai Hiwatari (火渡 カイ, Hiwatari Kai)
Voiced by: Urara Takano (Japanese); David Reale (English)
A merciless and ruthless Japanese-Russian beyblader. Tyson's fated rival, and through many hardships and Beyblading, eventually they become friends and share a strong bond between each other. The grandson of Voltaire Hiwatari. Master of sacred bit-beast Dranzer. He is member of the Bladebreakers and G Revolutions.
Max Tate (水原 マックス, Mizuhara Makkusu; lit. "Max Mizuhara")
Voiced by: Ai Orikasa (Japanese); Gage Knox (English)
A happy, good-natured Japanese-American child who always sees the best in everything and everyone. Master of sacred bit-beast Draciel. He is member of the Bladebreakers and G Revolutions.
Ray (Raymond) Kon (金 李, Kon Rei)
Voiced by: Aya Hisakawa (Japanese); Daniel DeSanto (English)
A level headed, balanced Chinese member of the Bladebreakers. He used to be leader of White Tiger. He is a neko-jin from fang tribe and master of sacred bit-beast Drigger. He is member of the Bladebreakers and G Revolutions.
Kenny (キョウジュ, real name: 才媛マナブ, Kyōju, real name: Saien Manabu)
Voiced by: Houko Kuwashima (Japanese); Katie Hood (English)
Also known as the Chief (Professor in the Japanese version), is the brains of the Bladebreakers team, a self-described nerd due to his advanced expertise on beyblading and computer technology, as well as an expert on every aspect of the sport. He has bit beast in his laptop named Dizzy. He is technician of the Bladebreakers, BBA Revolution and G Revolutions.
Daichi Sumeragi (皇 大地, Sumeragi Daichi)
Voiced by: Nao Nagasawa (Japanese); Mary Long (English)
A beyblader who joins Tyson's team in Beyblade G-Revolution after the Bladebreakers are dissolved. Master of Strata Dragoon. He is member of BBA Revolution and G Revolutions.

== Supporting characters ==
Lee Wong (ライ・チェン, Rai Chen)
Voiced by: Kohichi Nagano (Japanese); Peter Cugno (English)
The leader of the White Tigers / White Tiger X and Mariah's brother.
Mariah Wong (マオ・チェン, Mao Chen)
Voiced by: Niina Kumagaya (Japanese); Julie Lemieux (English)
A member of the White Tigers / White Tiger X and Lee's sister.
Kevin Cheng (キキ, Kiki)
Voiced by: Junko Shimakata (Japanese); Ari-Paul Saunders (season 1), Lyon Smith (season 3) (English)
A member of the White Tigers / White Tiger X.
Gary Tan (ガオゥ, Gaou)
Voiced by: Kazuyuki Ishikawa (Japanese); Craig Lauzon (English)
A member of the White Tigers / White Tiger X.
Michael Summers (マイケル・ソマーズ, Maikeru Somāzu)
Voiced by: Kappei Yamaguchi (Japanese); Lyon Smith (English)
Leader of the All-Starz / PPB All Starz.
Emily Watson (エミリー・ワトソン, Emirī Watoson)
Voiced by: Yukari Honma (Japanese); Julie Zwillich (English)
A member of the All-Starz / PPB All Starz.
Eddy Wheeler (エディ・スミス, Edi Sumisu; lit. "Eddie Smith")
Voiced by: Hisayoshi Suganuma (Japanese); Tim Grimes (English)
A member of the All-Starz / PPB All Starz.
Steven Jones (スティーブ, Sutību; lit. "Steve")
Voiced by: Kenichi Suzumura (Japanese); Vincent Corazza (English)
A member of the All-Starz. In G-Revolution, he is replaced by Rick due to injury.
Judy Tate (水原 ジュディ, Mizuhara Judi; lit. "Judy Mizuhara")
Voiced by: Emi Shinohara (Japanese); Susan Roman (English)
Max's mother, a researcher/scientist of the BBA, and the All Starz / PPB All Starz coach.
Sanguinex (ブラッド, Buraddo; lit. "Blood")
Voiced by: Hiroshi Kamiya (Japanese); Christopher Marren (English)
The unofficial leader of the Dark Bladers and Lupinex's older brother.
Lupinex (ハウリング, Hauringu; lit. "Howling")
Voiced by: Tsutomu Takayama (Japanese); Tony Daniels (English)
A member of the Dark Bladers and Sanguinex's little brother.
Cenotaph (カイロナ, Kairona; lit. "Cairona")
Voiced by: Kennichi Sakaguchi (Japanese); Robert Tinkler (English)
A member of the Dark Bladers.
Zomb (ジャイ, Jai)
Voiced by: Yuka Imai (Japanese); Tony Daniels (English)
A member of the Dark Bladers.
Robert Jürgens (ラルフ・ユルゲンス, Rarufu Yurugensu; lit. Ralf Jürgens)
Voiced by: Yuuki Matsuda (Japanese); Vince Corazza (season 1), Robert Smith (season 3) (English)
Team captain of the Majestics. He represents Germany.
Johnny McGregor (ジョニー・マクレガー, Jonī Makuregā)
Voiced by: Chiharu Tezuka (season 1), Hikaru Tokita (season 3) (Japanese); Jo Vannicola (English)
A member of the Majestics as the Blader for Scotland, and is known as the "Gladiator of Glasgow".
Enrique (ジャンカルロ・トルナトーレ, Jankaruro Torunatōre; lit. "Giancarlo Tornatore")
Voiced by: Daisuke Sakaguchi (Japanese); Julie Zwillich (English)
A member of the Majestics, representing Italy.
Oliver (オリビエ・ポーランジェ, Oribie Pōranje; lit. "Olivier Polanger")
Voiced by: Omi Minami (Japanese); Susan Roman (English)
The Beyblading champion of France and a member of the Majestics.
Tala Valkov (ユーリ・イヴァノーフ, Yūri Ivanōfu; lit. "Yuriy Ivanov")
Voiced by: Chiaki Morita (Japanese); Jamie Haydon-Devlin (English)
The captain of the Demolition Boys / The Blitzkrieg Boys.
Ian Papov (イワン・パホーフ, Iwan Pahōfu; lit. "Ivan Papov")
Voiced by: Aya Sakaguchi (Japanese); Shannon Perrault (English)
A member of the Demolition Boys.
Spencer Petrov (セルゲイ, Serugei; lit. "Sergei")
Voiced by: Tomokazu Sugita (Japanese); Peter Cugno (English)
A member of the Demolition Boys / The Blitzkrieg Boys.
Bryan Kuznetsov (ボリス・クズネツォーフ, Borisu Kuzunetsōfu; lit. "Boris Kuznetsov")
Voiced by: Wasabi Mizuta (Japanese); Craig Lauzon (English)
A member of the Demolition Boys / The Blitzkrieg Boys.
Voltaire Hiwatari (火渡 宗一郎, Hiwatari Sōichirō)
Voiced by: Kōji Ishii (Japanese); Allen Stewart-Coates (English)
Kai's grandfather and the true mastermind behind BIOVOLT Corporation.
Boris Balkov (ウラジミール・ヴォルコフ, Urajimīru Vorukofu; lit. "Vladimir Volkov")
Voiced by: Takehito Koyasu (Japanese); Tony Daniels (English)
A criminal mastermind who is the overall series antagonist seeking world dominion through Beyblade. He appears in the first season as Voltaire's accomplice under the cover of the Demolition Boys' trainer, running an Abbey as a front to select ideal beybladers while disposing of those who fail to live up to his standards while also utilizing unorthodox enhancements on them and their bit beasts. Boris escapes capture after Voltaire's criminal activities were exposed. Boris resurfaces during the events of G-Revolution, claiming to have reformed while establishing the BEGA League for his agenda before his plans were ultimately ruined.
Hilary Tachibana (立花 ヒロミ, Tachibana Hiromi)
Voiced by: Shiho Kikuchi (Japanese); Caitriona Murphy (English)
Tyson and Kenny's classmate, as well as the class president. She is tomboyish and known for her violent temper.
Ozuma (オズマ)
Voiced by: Yuki Kaida (Japanese); Alex House (English)
The leader of the Saint Shields.
Dunga (ドゥンガ)
Voiced by: Yasuhiro Takato (Japanese); Tony Daniels (English)
A member of the Saint Shields.
Mariam (マリアム, Mariamu)
Voiced by: Yuka Komatsu (Japanese); Shannon Perreault (English)
A member of the Saint Shields and Joseph's older sister.
Joseph (ユスフ, Yusufu)
Voiced by: Sachi Matsumoto (Japanese); Jason Barr (English)
A member of the Saint Shields and Mariam's younger brother.
Dr. Zagart (ザガート, Zagāto)
Voiced by: Kousei Hirota (Japanese); Lawrence Bayne (English)
Zeo's father and the CEO of Zagart Industries. He is trying to steal the four sacred beasts of the Bladebreakers in order to convert Zeo into a real boy.
Gideon (ギデオン)
Voiced by: Takashi Matsuyama (Japanese); Len Carlson (English)
The overseer of Team Psykick and the one who thought of the Cyber Bit-Beast project.
Doctor B (ドクターB, Dokutā Bī)
Voiced by: Tsuyoshi Koyama (Japanese); Tony Daniels (English)
The head scientist of Team Psykick.
Doctor K (ドクターK, Dokutā Kei)
Voiced by: Hikaru Ikeda (Japanese); Jo Vannicola (English)
A scientist that worked for Dr. Zagart before being fired for her disloyalty in handing over the extracted bit-beasts from the sacred rock she stole from Zagart.
Kane Yamashita (ケイン 山下, Kein Yamashita)
Voiced by: Yuuki Tai (Japanese); Peter Cugno (English)
The former leader of Team Psykick.
Salima (サリマ, Sarima)
Voiced by: Hikaru Ikeda (Japanese); Susan Roman (English)
A former member of Team Psykick.
Jim (ジム, Jimu)
Voiced by: Ayaka Yamashita (Japanese); Mary Long (English)
A former member of Team Psykick.
Goki (ゴウキ, Gōki)
Voiced by: Yasuhiro Fujiwara (Japanese); Craig Lauzon (English)
A former member of Team Psykick.
King (キング, Kingu)
Voiced by: Hirofumi Nojima (Japanese); David Berni (English)
The twin brother of Queen.
Queen (クィーン, Kuīn)
Voiced by: Mie Sonozaki (Japanese); Susan Laney Dalton (English)
The sister brother of King.
Zeo Zagart (ザガート・レオン, Zagāto Reon; lit. "Zagart Leon")
Voiced by: Hisayo Yanai (Japanese); Tim Hamaguchi (English)
A member of the Bladebreakers temporarily and later, Team Zagart.
Gordo (ゴルド, Gorudo)
Voiced by: Hisayoshi Suganuma (Japanese); Colin O'Meara (English)
Zeo's partner in the Beyblade World Championships.
Hiro Granger (木ノ宮 仁, Kinomiya Hitoshi)
Voiced by: Daisuke Namikawa (Japanese); Tim Hamaguchi (English)
Tyson's older brother and an extremely strong talented beyblader and an extraordinary Coach.
Rick Anderson (リック・アンダーソン, Rikku Andāson)
Voiced by: Takehiro Murozono (Japanese); Tony Daniels (English)
A new member of the PPB All-Starz, replacing Stevens due to injury in G-Revolution.
Miguel (ミハエル, Mihael)
Voiced by: Hiro Yuuki (Japanese); Chris Marren (English)
Captain of Barthez Battalion. He represents Spain.
Mathilda (マチルダ, Machiruda)
Voiced by: Hiromi Konno (Japanese); Katie Griffin (English)
A member of Barthez Battalion. She represents Sweden.
Claude (クロード, Kurōdo)
Voiced by: Akira Sasanuma (Japanese); Jason Barr (English)
A member of Barthez Battalion. He represents France.
Aaron (アーロン, Āron)
Voiced by: Kazuyuki Ishikawa (Japanese); Dan Warry-Smith (English)
A member of Barthez Battalion. He represents England.
Jean-Paul Barthez (バルテス, Barutesu)
Voiced by: Hitoshi Bifu (Japanese); Edward Glen (English)
The coach of the Barthez Battalion, which is named after him.
Julia Fernandez (ジュリア・フェルナンデス, Juria Ferunandesu)
Voiced by: Kumiko Watanabe (Japanese); Shannon Perreault (English)
A member of F-Dynasty and Raul's older twin sister.
Raul Fernandez (ラウル・フェルナンデス, Rauru Ferunandesu)
Voiced by: Akiko Kimura (Japanese); Jonathan Potts (English)
A member of F-Dynasty and Julia's younger twin brother.
Romero (ロメロ)
Voiced by: Hidefumi Takemoto (Japanese); Lyon Smith (English)
F-Dynasty's coach.
Brooklyn (ブルックリン, Burukkurin)
Voiced by: Sōichirō Hoshi (Japanese); Robert Tinkler (English)
The leader of the BEGA League.
Garland Siebald (ガーランド, Garland; Gārando)
Voiced by: Hiroshi Kamiya (Japanese); David Berni (English)
A member of the BEGA League and the leader of Justice Five.
Ming-Ming (ミンミン, Min Min)
Voiced by: Aya Hirano (Japanese); Sugar Lyn Beard (English)
A member of the BEGA League.
Mystel (ミステル, Misuteru)
Voiced by: Kōki Miyata (Japanese); Edward Glen (English)
A member of the BEGA League.
Crusher (モーゼス, Mōzesu; lit. "Moses")
Voiced by: Masachika Takatsuka (Japanese); Richard M. Dumont (English)
A member of the BEGA League.

== Other characters ==
DJ Jazzman (ブレーダーDJ, Burēdā DJ; lit. "Blader DJ")
Voiced by: Mitsuaki Madono (Japanese); Raoul Bhaneja (seasons 1 & 3), Tony Daniels (season 2) (English)
The BBA's top announcer and gives the signal to start every battle. He introduces the players and announces where the next tournament will take place.
Mr. B (ミスターB, Misutā Bī)
The black scientist that Kenny meets after watching Ray train for his battle with Tyson in Volume 2. He and Jin create the Spin-Gear system, which is first used by Ray Kon, and he makes Kenny create a left-spin gear in order to create Dragoon S. During the "Bakuten Shoot V Saga" in the manga, he gives Ray and Max the "Magnacore". His rival is Tyson's brother Hiro, as they are both into the deep secrets of beyblading and the Holy Monster series. However, they work together quite well.
Kennosuke Shishi (獅子 剣之介, Shishi Kennosuke)
A skilled beyblader and swordsman. He has a younger brother named Tenmaru and his bit-beast is Guardian Driger. Tenmaru usually helps Kennosuke train in swordsmanship. After an encounter with Daichi and a thief, Daichi desires to battle Kennosuke, who refuses. However, after Daichi's Gaia Dragoon almost injures him in a training accident, Kennosuke quickly accepts the challenge and he easily overpowers Daichi. After some harsh training, Daichi demands a rematch, which Kennosuke initially refuses, but later accepts after seeing the blisters on Daichi's hands, a result of his rigorous training. Kennosuke is defeated and resolves to work more on developing his beyblading skills.
During the qualifications of the GBC, Kennosuke battles against Takao, but loses. When Daichi partakes in a 100-battle challenge, Kennosuke returns, not as Daichi's opponent, but to support Tenmaru in his battle as Daichi's 100th opponent. When Daichi becomes annoyed at Tenmaru for constantly asking for rematches, Daichi becomes the "Kennosuke" of the Daichi-Kennosuke relationship when they first meet. Kennosuke returns a final time to support Daichi in his and Tyson's match against the Demolition Boys. He also appears briefly in the series-ending slideshow ("Kaze No Fuku Basho").
Tenmaru Shishi (獅子 天丸, Shishi Tenmaru)
Kennosuke's little brother, who helps him train in beyblading and swordsmanship. His beyblade is Thunder Dragon and he is first seen battling against Daichi as his 100th opponent. Angered by his loss, Tenmaru eagerly looks forward to a rematch, but Daichi refuses, with Tenmaru becoming the "Daichi" of the Daichi-Kennosuke relationship. He appears in the series-ending slideshow with Kennosuke.
Hikaru Tomonji (十文字 ヒカル, Tomonji Hikaru)
Hikaru is a young beyblader who comes from a wealthy family. His bit-beast is Spike Lizard and his beyblade is equipped with rollers for evasiveness and camouflage paint. He often has a group of fangirls that follow him around and cheer him on. He first meets Daichi when his little brother borrows his beyblade and then has it stolen by a Daichi impersonator. Hikaru witnesses Daichi's battle with the impersonator and stops him from running away with all the stolen beyblades. Afterward, he invites Daichi back to his mansion for a battle.
During his battle with Daichi, Hikaru loses, but the wings of Daichi's Gaia Dragoon break off. It turns out that Hikaru knows the Chief through the Internet. After Daichi repairs his beyblade, but is unable to activate the wings, Hikaru challenges Daichi to another match.
During the GBC qualifications, Hikaru loses to Kai Hiwatari. Hikaru returns to cheer Daichi on in the final match. He appears in the series-ending slideshow with Kennosuke and Tenmaru.
Makoto Granger (木ノ宮 マコト, Kinomiya Makoto)
Son of Tyson.
Gou Hiwatari (火渡 ゴウ, Hiwatari Gō)
Son of Kai.
Lin Kon (金 リン, Kon Rin)
Daughter of Ray and Mariah.
