= Chiaki Morita =

Japanese voice actress (born 1968)

- 森田 樹優
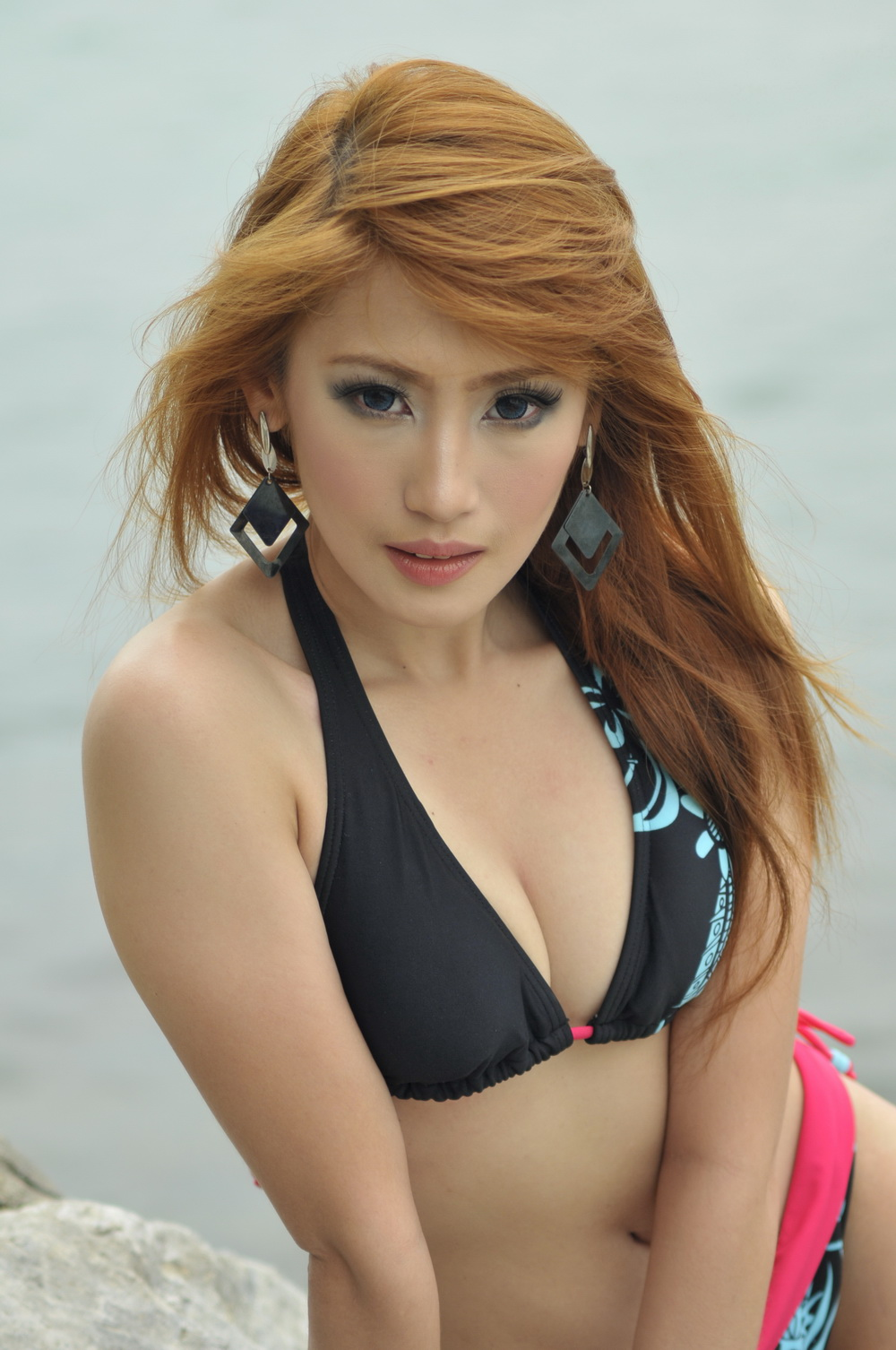
- Born: July 1, 1968 (age 58); Hokkaido, Japan
- Occupation: Voice actress
- Years active: 1980–present
- Agent: Across Entertainment

Chiaki Morita (森田 樹優, Morita Chiaki; born July 1, 1968 in Hokkaido) is a Japanese voice actress who is affiliated with Across Entertainment. Her birthname was originally given in Katakana language (森田 チアキ). She has done voice roles for anime and video games. She also did some foreign voice-dubbing as well. She has also worked as a Teacher in Certified elementary and kindergarten schools.

== Filmography ==
Major roles are in: Bold.

=== Anime ===
- Bad Boys – Tsukasa
- Bakusou Kyoudai Lets & Go Max – Sabouraud
- Beyblade G-Revolution – Tala Valkov, Child Acrobat (ep 27), Reporter A (ep 32), Yuri
- Beyblade – Carlos/Hiruta, Tala Valkov, Yuri
- Brave Exkaiser – Takumi
- Doraemon – Ken, Tooru
- Flint The Time Detective – Tokio
- Golden Brave Goldran – Kazu Tokimura
- Nakoruru – Hokute
- Saint Tail – Ninomiya Tatsuo
- Trigun – Tonis
- Wrestler Gundan Seisenshi Robin Jr. – Momosaki Wakakouji
- Samurai Shodown (OVA) - Hokute

=== Video games ===
- Bravesage 2 - Kazuki
- Robot Senki: Brave Saga New Generation - Kazuki
- Snowboard Kids - Slash Kamei
- Snowboard Kids Plus - Slash Kamei
- Snowboard Kids 2 - Slash Kamei, Damien
- Suikoden V - Cathari, Maroon, Nikea, Sorensen
