= Sabiston =

Sabiston is a surname. Notable people with the surname include:

- Andrew Sabiston (born 1965), Canadian actor, voice actor and television writer
- Bob Sabiston (born 1967), American art director and computer programmer
- Carole Sabiston (1939–2026), British-born Canadian textile artist
- David Sabiston (1924–2009), American surgeon and cardiologist
