= Stephanie Martin =

American-born Canadian singer

- Born: United States
- Origin: Montreal, Quebec, Canada
- Genres: Pop; musical theatre
- Occupations: Singer; actress
- Instrument: Vocals
- Years active: 1991–present
- Label: Sovereign Productions Inc
- Spouse: Andrew Sabiston (m. 1996)
- Website: stephaniemartin.ca

Stephanie Martin, sometimes credited as Stéphanie Martin, is an American–born Canadian singer and actress having performed in notable musical productions in both French and English. She is best known for her role as Éponine in three productions of the musical Les Misérables and as the Québécoise French singing voice of Pocahontas in the 1995 Disney animated film Pocahontas.

== Life and career ==
Stephanie Martin was born in the United States where she spent the first six years of her life. She is a dual Canadian-American citizen. The family then moved to Beaconsfield, Quebec where, as a child, Martin sang with both parents in Montreal's Donovan Chorale. She participated in the Diocesan Folk Music Camp for youths held at Camp Kinkora located in Saint-Adolphe-d'Howard, Quebec. She began performing publicly in her mid-teens in Montreal.

Stephanie Martin played the role of Éponine in Les Misérables for 3 consecutive years starting with the bilingual Montreal production in 1991 that led to the Paris production of Les Misérables in 1991–1992, followed by the London production in 1992–1993. This aforementioned production of Les Misérables in Paris won the 1992 Molière Award for Best Musical.

Stephanie Martin has performed with symphony orchestras across North America, Europe and Asia. She is a core member of Jeans 'n Classics developed by Peter Brennan. Martin has toured North America with Jeans 'n Classics singing with symphony orchestras in programs of classic rock. Martin has participated in a United Nations Show Tour for Canadian peacekeeping troops in Lahr, Zagreb and Sarajevo. There, Martin delivered a peace package from Quebec elementary school children. In 1995 and 1996, she toured 11 cities in Japan with the Francis Lai Music Orchestra International Tour under the direction of Raphael Sanchez.

Martin has numerous acting and singing credits in both Television and Film. She was heard announcing as the French "Voice of God" during the opening and closing ceremonies of the 2015 Pan American and Para Pan American Games held in Toronto.

Stephanie Martin has released two original music albums and one single. The albums shape line & harmony in 2007 and April Snow in 2016 were both co-written and produced by Juno Award winner Chad Irschick. The single SAILING ON was co-written with Diane Leah and produced by Dave Pickell.

Stephanie Martin has resided primarily in Toronto, Ontario with husband Andrew Sabiston since they met in 1994 during the Toronto musical production of Napoleon at the Elgin Theatre.

== Philanthropy ==
Stephanie Martin has contributed to fundraising events for organizations bringing awareness to missing people. She performed at the Bring Christina Home Fundraising Gala in 2008 and can be heard on the lead track of the Missing Children's Network benefit CD entitled Help us Find the Children.

Stephanie Martin was a committee member of Toronto's BIKESTOCK 2014, an organization promoting cycling safety in Toronto founded by Albert Koehl.

Stephanie Martin has been a guest singer at the Metropolitan Community Church of Toronto (MCC Toronto). Stephanie has recorded a version of her song Walk in the Light with noted musical director Diane Leah and the choir of MCC Toronto for their music album These Old Walls. Walk in the Light was the working title of her musical album, funded by Kickstarter backers, released March 30, 2016 as April Snow.

== Personal life ==
Martin has been married to Andrew Sabiston since 1996. They have one child.

== Discography ==
=== Original music studio albums ===
Year	Title	Artist	Producer	Label
2007	shape, line & harmony	Stephanie Martin	Chad Irschick	Sovereign Productions
2016	April Snow	Stephanie Martin	Chad Irschick	Sovereign Productions

=== Original music studio single ===
Year	Title	Composers/Artists/Writers	Producer	Label
2010	SAILING ON	Diane Leah, Stephanie Martin, Dave Pickell	Dave Pickell	Sovereign Productions

=== Musicals; cast recording credits ===
Year	Title	Producer	Role
1991	Les Misérables	Trema, original Paris cast recording	Éponine
1995	Robert Marien: Broadway-Montreal	Analekta, cast recording	Lead tracks
1996	Napoleon	EMI Broadway Angel, Toronto cast recording	Clarice
1997	La vie en bleu: comédie musicale	Trema, original Paris cast	Germaine
2011	Schwartz's: The Musical	Centaur Theatre Company, Montreal live cast recording	Amber

=== Animation feature ===
Year	Title	Producer	Role
1995	Pocahontas, une légende indienne	Walt Disney Records, French Québécois recording	Pocahontas singing voice

== Theatre productions ==
Year	Title	Theatre	Director	Role
1991	Les Misérables	Théâtre Saint-Denis, Montreal, Winnipeg tour	Richard J. Alexander	Éponine
1991–1992	Les Misérables	Théâtre Mogador, Paris	John Caird	Éponine
1992–1993	Les Misérables	Palace Theatre, London	John Caird/Trevor Nunn	Éponine
1993	Tycoon (Starmania in French)	Sydmonton Festival, London	Tim Rice, Luc Plamondon	Crystal
1994	Napoleon	The Elgin Theatre, Toronto	John Wood	Clarice
1994	Robert Marien: Broadway-Montreal, musical revue	chapiteau Saint-Sauveur, Quebec and tour	Robert Marien	various
1994	Love Notes	Centaur Theatre Company, Montreal	Lu Hanessian	various
1997	La vie en bleu: comédie musicale	Théâtre Mogador, Paris and Monaco	Robert Hossein	Germaine
2009	Napoleon	Talk is Free Theatre, Barrie	Richard Ouzounian	Therese
2011	Schwartz's: The Musical	Centaur Theatre Company, Montreal	Roy Surette	Amber

== Animation features credits – singer ==
Year	Title	Distribution	Role
1995	Le caillou et le pingouin; Quebec version of The Pebble and the Penguin	Metro-Goldwyn-Mayer (direct to video)	Marina singing voice, Quebec dub
1995	Pocahontas, une légende indienne	Disney animation	Pocahontas singing, Quebec dub
1998	Pocahontas 2 : À la découverte d'un monde nouveau	Disney animation (direct to video)	Pocahontas singing, Quebec dub

== Television ==
=== Series and television film credits – actress ===
Year	Title	Role
2003	Interlude	Izumi Marufuji (English version, voice)
2006	Time Warp Trio	Sophie
2006–2012	Postcards from Buster	Mora (voice) – 15 episodes
2007	Booky & the Secret Santa	(television film) Caroler No. 1
2010	The Dating Guy	Shoji (voice)

=== Series credits – singer/back-up vocalist ===
Year	Title	Particulars
2003–2005	JoJo's Circus	back-up vocalist – 8 episodes
2006–2012	Postcards from Buster	featured songs singer – 15 episodes

== See also ==
- List of Canadian musicians
