= List of Sakura Wars characters =

This article is a list of fictional characters from the Sakura Wars series. The visuals of the characters were created by Kōsuke Fujishima and designed by Hidenori Matsubara (who is also known for Evangelion), while their scenarios were written by Satoru Akahori.

The names of the various troupes/divisions of the Imperial Combat Revue (e.g., flower, star, moon, wind) are modeled on those of the Takarazuka Kagekidan (Takarazuka Revue). Similarly, the names of the troupe members are often patterned on the name of the troupe—flowers in the Flower Division and the Paris Combat Revue, celestial bodies in the Star Division (the New York Combat Revue also uses celestial bodies). The naming patterns are likely the work of Akahori, who uses such throughout most of his creations (e.g., in Sorcerer Hunters and Saber Marionette J).

== Protagonists ==
=== Ichiro Ogami ===
Ichiro Oogami (大神 一郎, Ōgami Ichirō)

Voiced by (Japanese): Akio Suyama
Voiced by (English): Brian Gaston (OVAs), Corey M. Gagne (TV) (ADV Films), Daniel Katsük (FUNimation for Sakura Wars: École de Paris), Dave Wittenberg (Bandai/Geneon, FUNimation for Sakura Taisen: Sumire, Sakura Wars, So Long, My Love)

He was chosen to head the Flower Division when he proved himself capable during a test of a Koubu prototype. Kayama was with him during that time, but eventually Ogami was sent to work with the Flower Division, as Kayama worked with the Moon Division. In the TV series version, he temporarily assumed the role of Assistant Commander. Originally an ensign, he was later promoted to lieutenant junior grade. Ogami was later given the Shintou-Mekkyaku, one of the four spiritual swords, by an injured Yoneda after he awoke from a coma. Later he and Sakura came to possess the Shinken-Shirahadori and Koutou-Mukei spiritual swords to carry out the Ni-ken Ni-tou no Gi. Though Ogami is the primary protagonist of the Sakura Wars games, he plays a minor role in the anime and manga adaptions.

=== Seijuro Kamiyama ===
Seijuro Kamiyama (神山 誠十郎, Kamiyama Seijūrō)

Voiced by (Japanese): Yohei Azakami
Voiced by (English): Ian Sinclair (Sakura Wars: The Animation anime)

Following the events of the Great Demon War results in the loss of the combat revues of Flower, Paris and New York Combat Revues, Kamiyama is assigned to take military command of the new Flower Division and the Imperial Theater house, now under the leadership of Sumire Kanzaki. He is a childhood friend of Sakura Amamiya.

== Imperial Combat Revue ==
=== Flower Division (Imperial Combat Revue) ===
Members of the Imperial Combat Revue's Flower Division. Clockwise from top: Kanna Kirishima, Sumire Kanzaki, Iris Chateaubriand, Sakura Shinguji, Ichiro Ogami, Li Kohran and Maria Tachibana.

==== Sakura Shinguji ====
Sakura Shinguji (真宮寺 さくら, Shingūji Sakura)

Voiced by (Japanese): Chisa Yokoyama
Voiced by (English): Amber Allison (Sakura Wars 1 OVA), Katherine Catmull (Sakura Wars 2 OVA) (both ADV Films), Jenny Larson (Sakura Wars TV), Wendee Lee (Bandai/Geneon, FUNimation, Sakura Wars: So Long, My Love)

Protagonist heroine of the 1st Installment. As the daughter of Kazuma Shinguji, the hero of the last demon war, and heir to both the spiritual power and the swordsmanship of the Shinguji family, she was summoned to Tokyo by General Yoneda sometime after the formation of the Flower Division. Struggling to adapt to life in the metropolis after arriving from rural Sendai, she is further troubled by trying to integrate with the already established members of the Flower Division.

Often seen as either clumsy or a country yokel by many of the other members when she first arrives, she steadily increases in skill and confidence to become one of the strongest of the group. Other than her open and friendly personality, the main benefits she brings to the group are the Shinguji family's hereditary power to defeat evil and the Reiken-Arataka. Her uniform and kobu are pink.

==== Sumire Kanzaki ====
Sumire Kanzaki (神崎 すみれ, Kanzaki Sumire)

Voiced by (Japanese): Michie Tomizawa
Voiced by (English): Sascha Biesi (Sakura Wars 1 OVA), Lauren Zinn (Sakura Wars 2 OVA) (both ADV Films), Leigh Anderson Fisher (Sakura Wars TV), Christiana Yuuki, (FUNimation), Michelle Ruff (Bandai/Geneon, Sakura Wars the Animation)

An established selfish actress of great talent and self-professed star of the Flower Division, Sumire is arrogant and conceited, perhaps because she was raised as a spoiled brat, with her father and grandfather being good-hearted yet very workaholic. Despite her attitude, she is a skilled pilot and highly capable of wielding a naginata, and can sometimes be rather wise. She is a daughter born into the elite Kanzaki industrial clan, whose factory produced the Koubu. Her uniform and kobu are purple. She returns in Shin Sakura Taisen Animation Series to become the overall manager for the new Teikoku Kagekidan.

It is thought that she is named after the well-known Takarazuka member Sumire Haruno.

==== Maria Tachibana ====
Maria Tachibana (マリア・タチバナ) (Russian: Мария Татибана, romanized: Mariya Tatibana)

Voiced by (Japanese): Urara Takano
Voiced by (English): Catherine Berry (ADV Films), Kelsey Kling (Sakura Wars TV), Jane Alan (Bandai/Geneon, Funimation))

A veteran of the Russian Revolution, Maria is the only member of the Flower Division with prior experience of military tactics and warfare. This experience is why she was chosen to be the original leader of the group. However, though her struggles in Russia have left her an expert marksman and skilled tactician, she also becomes coldly logical and unwilling to interact with others on an emotional level, which leads to being labeled "Kazuar" (Russian: Казуар, romanized: kazuar, meaning "cassowary"). After a series of setbacks, it is decided that Ichiro Ogami should replace her as leader, with Maria remaining as his second. After an initial period of friction between the pair when Ogami arrives, Maria's attitude begins to turn slightly, though she still remains the most coldly emotional of the group. Sakura looks up at Maria very much at the beginning. Her uniform and kobu are Navy Blue.

==== Iris Châteaubriand ====
Iris Châteaubriand (イリス・シャトーブリアン (アイリス), Irisu Shatōburian (Airisu))

Voiced by (Japanese): Kumiko Nishihara
Voiced by (English): Jessica Schwartz (OAV1, OAV2), Evita Arce (Sakura Wars TV Ep.1-9), Larissa Wolcott (Sakura Wars TV Ep.10-25), Carrie Savage (Sakura Wars: The Movie and Sakura Wars: Sumire)

Born into an aristocratic family somewhere in France (in the state of Champagne), Iris typically wears a green gown with white apron and pink ribbon on her hair and carries her teddy bear Jean Paul around with her. Both her uniform and Kobu are yellow. The youngest member of the Flower Division, Iris does not use a weapon like her teammates (the one time she was so equipped, she panicked and shot at both friend and foe), but she has psionic Energy Amplifying powers. She can heal her teammates with her Marionette ability. Because of this, she is the core of the Haja no Jin spiritual barricade formation. She is also capable of teleportation. She says that when she is 20 years old, she will marry Ogami. Her parents apparently kept her locked in her room for a long time, scared by her psychic abilities, until Ayame came up to them and offered to take Iris to Japan.

==== Kohran Li ====
Kohran Li (李 紅蘭, Japanese: Li Kōran) (simplified Chinese: 李红兰; traditional Chinese: 李紅蘭; pinyin: Lǐ Hónglán)

Voiced by (Japanese): Yuriko Fuchizaki
Voiced by (English): Boni Hester (ADV Films), Samantha Inoue-Harte (Sakura Wars TV), Dorothy Elias-Fahn (credited as Annie Pastrano for Sakura Wars: The Movie) (Bandai/Geneon, FUNimation)
Place of origin: Peking, China

Cheerful, and good humoured, Kohran is mechanically inclined and loves to work with the koubu. She works as the stage manager of the Flower Division. A running joke in the series is that Kohran's inventions are rather accident-prone, often backfiring or blowing up in her face. She sometimes uses Ogami as a guinea pig to test her inventions, with predictably hilarious results when the inventions blow up during testing. Despite her cheerful attitude, she also has a serious side regarding her past; a bandit raid killed her parents and was said to be the only survivor during the village fire. She idolizes the creator of the Koubu, Shinnosuke Yamazaki. Her uniform and kobu are green.

==== Kanna Kirishima ====
Kanna Kirishima (桐島 カンナ, Kirishima Kanna)

Voiced by (Japanese): Mayumi Tanaka
Voiced by (English): Sheila Gordon (Sakura Wars 1 OVA), Lane West (Sakura Wars 2 OVA) (both ADV Films), Lee Eddy (Sakura Wars TV), Mary Elizabeth McGlynn (credited as Melissa Williamson) (Bandai/Geneon, FUNimation)

Always hungry and tomboyish, the fairly easygoing Kanna serves as the group's raw muscle. Kanna is the master of a Martial Arts style that allows her to easily kill a bull with her bare hands. While normally brave, she is afraid of snakes. She sometimes gets into an argument with Sumire over their differences in attitude. Her uniform and kobu are red.

==== Orihime Soletta ====
Orihime Soletta (ソレッタ・織姫, Soretta Orihime)

Voiced by (Japanese): Maya Okamoto
Voiced by (English): Jessica Smolins (ADV Films), Melissa Fahn (credited as Tina Dixon) (Bandai/Geneon, FUNimation)

An extremely beautiful Italian-Japanese girl, Orihime was at first cordial to all of her teammates—except for Ōgami. The reason she holds a grudge against Ogami is because her Japanese father, Seiya Ogata, abandoned her; after that, she despised all Japanese men, thinking them unreliable. However, Ogami managed to eventually reunite her with Ogata, with whom she made peace, and Orihime and Ogami become close friends. Her uniform and kobu are magenta.

==== Reni Milchstraße ====
Reni Milchstraße (レニ・ミルヒシュトラーセ, Reni Miruhishutorāse)

Voiced by (Japanese): Kazue Ikura
Voiced by (English): Kelley Huston (ADV Films), Mona Marshall (Bandai/Geneon, FUNimation)

As a young child in Germany, Reni was part of a program that created high spirit power children called "wunderkind" (translated from German as "Miracle Child"). Because of that project, Reni is so distant and tomboyish that everyone initially thought she was a boy. With Oogami and everyone else's support however, she becomes more open, and gets along well with Iris. Mentioned in the ADV Sakura Wars TV pamphlet Leni has great battlefield tactic knowledge and is a gifted ballerina. It is possible that she is named after Leni Riefenstahl, a German filmmaker whose most famous work was "Triumph of the Will". Her uniform and kobu are blue.

=== Flower Division (Sakura Wars (2019)) ===
All primary characters of the Flower Division were designed by Manga artist Tite Kubo.

Sakura Amamiya (天宮 さくら, Amamiya Sakura)

4th protagonist heroine installment. A childhood friend of Seijuro Kamiyama and admirer of Sakura Shinguji, whom inspired her to act at the Imperial Theater and join the Flower Division. In the events of Sakura Wars she becomes the team's captain and gets her own special Kubo.

Voiced by (Japanese): Ayane Sakura Voiced by (English): Cherami Leigh (anime)

Hatsuho Shinonome (東雲 初穂, Shinonome Hatsuho)

A childhood friend of Sakura Amamiya. Her family runs a Shinto shrine thus Hatsuho is always seen wearing a priestess outfit. She is known to be impulsive and short tempered among her teammates.

Voiced by (Japanese): Maaya Uchida Voiced by (English): Amber Lee Connors (anime)

Clarissa Snowflake (クラリッサ・スノーフレイク, Kurarissa Sunōfureiku)

Originally from Luxembourg, Clarissa serves as the playwright for the Imperial Theater. She usually goes by her nickname, Clairs.

Voiced by (Japanese): Saori Hayami
Voiced by (English): Amanda Gish (anime)

Anastasia Palma (アナスタシア・パルマ, Anasutashia Paruma)

A theater diva originally from Greece, she is the last to join the New Flower Combat revue. During the events of the game's story, she's secretly a double agent working with the demons Yaksha and Genan but eventually betrays them to help her teammates on the Flower Division.

Voiced by (Japanese): Ayaka Fukuhara
Voiced by (English): Stephanie Young (anime)

Azami Mochizuki (望月 あざみ, Mochizuki Azami)

A young girl who is said to be descendent from a prominent clan of ninjas, Azami at the start is the youngest member until the events of the anime when Klara joins the Revue.

Voiced by (Japanese): Hibiku Yura
Voiced by (English): Sarah Wiedenheft (anime)

Klara M. Ruzhkova (クラーラ, Kurara M. Ruzhkova)

Originally from Russia, Klara is the youngest member to join the Flower Revue during the events of the anime series. Klara is at first eersumed to be the sole survivor of her unit, the Moscow Combat Revue and placed under protection of WLOF with Flower Division taking her in. Questions arise when her elder sister, Layla and the proclaimed Moscow Revue Captain, Valery Kaminsky arrive in Japan with the intent to return Klara to Russia but Kanzaki and the reset of the Revue wait on final orders before returning Klara.

=== Wind Division ===
The Wind Division (風組) is the support unit for the Flower Division. The members assist in the running of the Imperial Theater, and act as bridge crew during combat operations, also piloting the Shogei-Maru (an airship) and Gourai-Gou (a high-speed underground transport train). They were known to have crashed the Shogei-maru into the enemy stronghold to "inject" the Flower Division inside. They are also known as the "Teigeki Sannin Musume" (Three Little Maids of the Imperial Theater).

Kasumi Fujii (藤井 かすみ, Fujii Kasumi)

Voiced by (Japanese): Akemi Okamura
Voiced by (English): Jessica L. Wilson (OVA 1), Meg Bauman (OVA 2), Monica Bustamante (TV), Karen Strassman (Movie), Mona Marshall (Sumire)

Yuri Sakakibara (榊原 由里, Sakakibara Yuri)

Voiced by (Japanese): Yuki Masuda
Voiced by (English): Elise Ivy (OVA 1), Kelly Dealyn (OVA 2), Elia Nichols (TV), Lynn Fischer (Movie, Sumire)

Tsubaki Takamura (高村 椿, Takamura Tsubaki)

Voiced by (Japanese): Kyoko Hikami
Voiced by (English): Shelby Johnson-Sapp (OVA 1), Cassie Fitzgerald (OVA 2, TV), Philece Sampler (Movie), Sara Nicole (Sumire)

=== Wind Division (Sakura Wars (2019)) ===
Kaoru Rindou (竜胆 カオル, Rindou Kaoru)

Voiced by (Japanese): Yui Ishikawa
Voiced by (English): Monica Rial (anime)

Personal secretary to Sumire Kanzaki and oversees the business operations of the Imperial Theater.

Komachi Ooba (大葉 こまち, Ōba Komachi)

Voiced by (Japanese): Ryoko Shiraishi
Voiced by (English): Tia Ballard (anime)

A young woman originating from Osaka who serves as the shopkeeper for the Imperial Theater's giftshop. Her role in the game is to give the player in-game collectables.

=== Moon Division ===
Yuichi Kayama (加山 雄一, Kayama Yūichi)

Voiced by (Japanese): Takehito Koyasu
Voiced by (English): B. Michael Rains (ADV Films), Steven Blum (Bandai/Geneon), Keith Silverstein (NIS America)

Graduating from the same naval academy as Ichiro Ōgami at the same time, Kayama was intended as the original replacement for Maria as leader of the Flower Division. However, after it was found that his above average spiritual power was still not enough to power a Kōbu, General Yoneda found a different use for him. Given command of the Moon Division, or "Moon Division" (the reconnaissance and intelligence unit for the Flower Division), Kayama's role is to carry out any and all covert missions for the general. As part of his duties he is often seen in disguise, whilst discreetly passing on information to Yoneda. He has some limited psychic abilities, including being able to induce hallucinations in others, according to the anime. This was done in the TV series. An illusion was placed on Blue Setsuna. He works well with Kaede Fujieda, and frequently talks to her, when he has time, as seen in the second OVA adaptation.

=== Moon Division (Sakura Wars (2019)) ===
Itsuki Saijou (西城 いつき, Saijō Itsuki)

Voiced by (Japanese): Mayu Yoshioka
Voiced by (English): Alexis Tipton (anime)

A young 15-year old girl whom always hangs around the Imperial Theater as she is a big fan of the theater and is usually clad in a Sailor fuku uniform with a short skirt. Later in the 2019 game, she's revealed to be secretly the Captain of the Moon Division. She is one of the characters designed by artist Noizi Ito.

Hiromi Hongou (本郷 ひろみ, Hongō Hiromi)

Voiced by (Japanese): Haruka Terui
Voiced by (English): Caitlin Glass (anime)

A young woman who in civilian life runs a sweet shop. She is also revealed to be a secret member of the Moon Division in the game. Her character art was also conceptualized by Noizi Ito.

=== Dream Division ===
The Dream Division is a group of women who have strong psychic abilities who provide psychic reinforcement from afar to the Teito Kagekidan when they are in battle. Another function of the Dream Division is to perform psychic research on recovered artifacts, though this can occasionally trigger a brutal response from their enemies. They never appeared in the games, but they do appear in the film and anime television series.

=== Rose Division ===
The Rose Division are the self-styled "Evil Spirit Defense Forces" and the self-styled "Secret Corps of Love and Beauty." The members are all okama. The Rose Division are attached to the army and live in the basement of the Imperial Theatre where the shows are held. Kotone and Kikunojō have a more prominent role in the stage version of the show. They often feature in the plot, have their own songs and dance numbers, and in later shows participate in the "play-within-a-play" as secondary actors.

Kotone Seiryūin (清流院 琴音, Seiryūin Kotone)

Voiced by (Japanese): Kazuki Yao
Voiced by (English): Liam O'Brien (Bandai/Geneon)

The commanding officer of the Rose Division, he holds the rank of an army captain. He is a skilled fighter of the group. His name is that of a woman's and he is very flamboyant in dress and attitude. Of the three members of his unit, he is the only one who dresses in men's clothing.

Kikunojō Oka (丘 菊之丞, Oka Kikunojō)

Voiced by (Japanese): Taiki Matsuno

A second lieutenant who dresses in the tight-skirted army uniform meant for women, and who at first glance resembles a girl. He has a crush on Ōgami.

Yokihiko Ōta (太田 斧彦, Ōta Yokihiko)

Voiced by (Japanese): Daisuke Gōri
Voiced by (English): Jamieson Price (Bandai/Geneon)

An army sergeant who has very muscular physique and a deep voice. "Yokiko" uses woman's language, wears make-up, and dresses in the female military uniform.

=== Maiden Division ===
The Maiden Division are a troupe of young girls who were chosen for their potential to eventually become Koubu pilots. In an effort to raise their spiritual powers to the level needed to control the koubu they are trained in theatrical arts. The Maiden Division were at hand when Tokyo was attacked by a mysterious organization, known only as Yami Mono or the Dark Ones, while the Flower Division was away. They appeared only in the musical "Hanasaku Otome" and were portrayed by the girls of the Minami Aoyama Show-jo Kagekidan.

Haruka Nonomura (野々村 春香, Nonomura Haruka)

Voiced by (Japanese): Saeko Chiba

Haruka is an orphan and the older sister of Tsubomi. She is a bit klutzy and is generally made fun of by her fellow Otome-gumi members. Although it is stated early in the play that she is spiritually the weakest member of the group, eventually it is revealed she has the most raw spiritual power but just does not know how to manifest it.

=== Command & Support ===
Lieutenant General Ikki Yoneda (米田 一基, Yoneda Ikki)

Voiced by (Japanese): Masaru Ikeda
Voiced by (English): Bill McMillin (ADV Films), David Orosco (Bandai/Geneon, FUNimation)

He is one of four original members of the Anti-Kouma Unit, a precursor of the Imperial Capital Defense. He went on to become the commanding general of the Imperial Combat Revue, and at the same time acting as the manager for their other persona. He is almost never seen without a bottle of sake in hand. By the end of the fourth game, he retires and appoints Ohgami as his successor.

Ayame Fujieda (藤枝 あやめ, Fujieda Ayame)

Voiced by (Japanese): Ai Orikasa
Voiced by (English): Amy L. Gambler (ADV Films)

Another former member of the Anti-Descended Evil Unit, she works closely as a talent scout for the Imperial Capital Dramatic Troupe. She was responsible for bringing Li Kohran from Shanghai, Maria Tachibana from New York and Iris Châteaubriand from France over to Japan. Ayame is a talented linguist, having spoken no less than four languages and two regional dialects during her time in the series. She is known to speak English, Japanese (Kanto and Okinawa dialects), French, and Chinese (it is unknown whether it is Mandarin or Cantonese she is speaking). She may also possess a basic understanding of Russian. She did not die in the TV series.

Kaede Fujieda (藤枝 かえで, Fujieda Kaede)

Voiced by (Japanese): Ai Orikasa
Voiced by (English): Meredith May (ADV Films), Lia Sargent (Bandai/Geneon)

Ayame's little sister, she comes to Japan, around the same time as Orihime and Leni, for Kaede was originally Deputy Commander to the short-lived European Star Division, stepping in her older sister's shoes after her death. Kaede is seen as the more "Independent" and less conservative of the two.

Reiji Shiba (司馬 令士, Shiba Reiji)

Voiced by (Japanese): Tomokazu Sugita
Voiced by (English): Zeno Robinson

A friend and Naval Academy classmate of Seijuro, he is the mechanic for the Combat Revue and theater.

=== Council of Elders ===
Yoritsune Hanakōji (花小路 頼恒, Hanakōji Yoritsune)

Voiced by (Japanese): Kōichi Kitamura
Voiced by (English): Michael McConnohie (Bandai/Geneon)

Yoritsune Hanakōji is a prominent Count (Hakushaku) who secretly finances the operations of the Imperial Combat Revue.

== Paris Combat Revue ==
=== Flower Division (Paris Combat Revue) ===
==== Erica Fontaine ====
Erica Fontaine (エリカ・フォンティーヌ, Erika Fontīnu)
Voiced by (Japanese): Noriko Hidaka
Voiced by (English): Caitlin Glass (FUNimation)

A protagonist heroine 3th installment sixteen-year-old nun in training, and a cabaret dancer for Chattes Noires at night. A devout Christian, who genuinely wants to help people in need, however, because of her clumsy nature, those who receive her help often ends up with more trouble. She sometimes mistakes her dreams and imagination as reality, and acts on it, creating havoc. In the game, she frequently walks into a billboard, hitting her head. Once, during the game, when her true spiritual powers awaken, she takes on a serious, divine personality.

She has a great interest in Japan and its culture, although her knowledge is often anachronistic, or wrong. She asks Ogami about Japan many times in the game. Her favorite food is pudding. Her hobbies are: bible reading, prayer, helping people, and machine gun shooting. She carries two cross-shaped machine guns named "Raphael" and "Gabriel", concealed inside her skirt.

When she was young, her parents died in an accident, in which she survived by accidentally using her special powers. Afraid that people who have seen her powers will think ill of her, she decides to live and become a nun in a church ran by Father Leno. She genuinely tries to help others in need, yet her clumsiness almost always creates more trouble. For example; when asked by Father Leno to clean the sanctuary, she ends up destroying the Virgin Mary statue, when she was in charge of clearing the weed near the church, she ends up plucking out the flower bed, and when she was in charge of the cooking, and she cooked up a dish that was inedible. Because of such action, she was actually asked to leave the convent but due to her misunderstanding and impression of Leno's saying, she stayed there for six more months.

In Sakura Taisen: École De Paris, Grand-Mère first meets her in a church seeing her praying with angel wings and she became the first Paris Flower Division. But after one year of training, she still slacks much to Grand-Mère's dismay. She makes friends with Glycine and recruits Glycine as the second member, after saving her. It is also shown that she gets her infamous wake-up maracas dance from Father Leno. When Erica is arrested as an accomplice of Lobelia due to Lobelia's lie, Erica wonders what Lobelia meant by having pleasure in the morning with men. Father Leno, being at a loss for an answer, tells her that men and women dance in the morning to show gratitude to God.

When Ogami came to Paris, she was the first member to meet him during a commotion in the European exposition ground. In the chapter where the Teito members (Maria, Kanna and Kohran) came to Paris as coaches to coach the Paris Flower Division, she failed all the drills. However, the coaches felt that her spiritual powers have not been awakened. During this chapter, Father Leno comes to Ogami and asks him to tell Erica to leave the convent, due to Erica's clumsiness creating more havoc. Having heard their conversation, compounded by her failure in the drills earlier, she feels she is no longer needed anywhere. With nowhere to stay or go, she wanders around the raining city until Ogami finds her. She falls sick and ends up staying in Ogami's place, where Ogami notices her enormous spiritual powers. The next day, although she hesitates at first to come back to Chattes Noires, the rest of the Paris Flower Division manages to convince Erica to come back, by making a fake emergency call. But a few minutes later, a real attack on Chattes Noires occurs. During this attack, her spiritual power awakens when she tries to save her friends from being killed by Corbeau. In the end, Erica is given a room in the attic of Chattes Noires.

Erica is always seen smiling and trying to cheer up everyone. In Sakura Taisen Le Nouveau Paris, due to the nature of the game Sakura Taisen, a debate occurs amongst the Flower Division members as to whom the next captain of the Flower Division should be. At first, each member feels that Ogami chose herself as the next captain, however, in the end Erica is chosen as the Captain of the Paris Flower Division by the member themselves, though she still has her perky and clumsy attitude. This ends up being temporary as Erica resigns from the captain post in the end when she realizes the captains of the kagekidans generally end up being servants to the kagekidan members' whims, and Grand-Mère notes that the Paris Combat Revue does not need a captain to guide them to defend Paris.

==== Glycine Bleumer ====
Glycine Bleumer (グリシーヌ・ブルーメール, Gurishīnu Burūmēru)
Voiced by (Japanese): Saeko Shimazu
Voiced by (English): Colleen Clinkenbeard (FUNimation)

The daughter and sole heir of the Bleumer family, a great noble of Normandy descent. Her personality is aggressive, due to her Viking blood. She is preoccupied as to how a noble should act and contribute to society. She is also extremely proud with talent to back it up, and does not hesitate to hard work to gain such talent. A very responsible and reliable member of the Flower Division. She is a good friend to Kitaoji Hanabi, who lives in the Bleumer family palace. She loves small animals (revealed in the dating event in Chapter 6), and has humanity to protect the weak.

Because of her pride as the protector of Paris, both as a noble and a member of the Flower Division; she, at first, does not think that a foreigner such as Ogami could protect Paris. However, as she sees the genuine nature in Ogami, she starts to respect Ogami as the captain of the Flower Division.

There is a "Bridegroom Test" for the Bluemer Family, which requires excellent intelligence, battle skills, and blood line, to be accepted as the "Complete and Perfect" bridegroom for Glycine. Ogami passed the test.

Due to what appeared to Glycine as a lack of pride in Ogami, she had an argument with him and eventually a duel. Ogami loses (Since he was worried of attacking her when she lost her balance) and becomes a temporary maid for the Bleumer family. Later, she was proposed to another noble named Count Richie. But Ogami manages to expose his true identity by challenging him to a duel and winning. Watching the duel, she thinks that Ogami lost to her on purpose. In the end, she respects Ogami after another argument with him and finds out the true meaning of nobility.

She has a personal head maid named Tarebou and always sneaks out the house with multiple excuses while she works in Chattes Noires as "Blue Eyes" to conceal her identity. In the game, Ogami is asked to help her get out of a Bleumer traditional event, where octopus, which she hates, is served. According to Grand-Mère, if they used her real name, the Bleumer family will come storming into Chattes Noires for making their only daughter a cabaret dancer.

==== Coquelicot ====
Coquelicot (コクリコ, Kokuriko)
Voiced by (Japanese): Etsuko Kozakura
Voiced by (English): Monica Rial (FUNimation)

An orphan from Annam (current Vietnam) who was raised up as a young magician in a circus. She works and lives with a circus named "Circus De Europe". She was always seen collecting leftovers in the town market and treating the circus animals as her friends. Even though she was treated badly by the ringmaster and always seen smiling all the time, yet she is actually trying to hide her sad feelings of loneness. During the first encounter with Ogami, she first refers to him as "Oji-san" (which in Japanese means "Old man") yet later she calls him Ichiro all the time. After Ogami notice her background in the circus, he felt pity of her.

Soon, a new performer named Karuchera joins in the circus. She heard her stories of her losing her daughter, assuming that both are in the same boat, she decides to call her "Mama". The truth is that Karuchera is actually Python in her human form (see her profile). Luckily, Ogami and Erica reveals her true identity and she manage to chase her away when Python taken her as hostage. As she used up all her powers and brought back to Chattes Noires, Grand-Mère intends to take her as a member of the Flower Division but Ogami tells Grand-Mère to let her decide since she has a sorrowful background, not knowing that she was already awake. In the end, she becomes a member of the Paris Flower Division. After the Paris Flower Division kills Python, she works as the ringmaster (after the original Ringmaster is murdered by Python) in the morning and as a magician in Chattes Noires. Like Erica, she does not use any stage name to cover her identity.

In Sakura Taisen: Le Nouveau Paris, she assumes that she and Hanabi does not have any parents until Masamichi Kitaoji, Hanabi's father comes during their turn for a lookout for the grave robber. She even saves everyone from getting suspected by Masamichi by telling him that Hanabi, her and the rest of the gang are working in the circus since Kagekidan can either mean "Combat Revue" or "Entertainment Troupe", after Erica accidentally spills out their true identity. But during Hanabi's performance, Évian spills out their working place, Chattes Noires, and Masamichi volunteer to get onto the stage. Assuming that he will take her back, she tells him that she will not let her take her back to Japan and a few parental speech. But it turns out otherwise as he is actually wants to see her smile.

==== Lobelia Carlini ====
Lobelia Carlini (ロベリア・カルリーニ, Roberia Karurīni)
Voiced by (Japanese): Kikuko Inoue
Voiced by (English): Ashley Moynihan (FUNimation)

A thief, who was sentenced to one thousand years of confinement for her numerous crimes. Because eighty percent of the criminal incident in Paris was her doing, she was called the greatest in Paris. She has a tendency to use any means to achieve her goal: she used her spiritual powers to commit her crimes, and burned a famous painting when the enemy tried to use it as a bargaining chip (when asked how she knew the painting she had destroyed was a fake, Lobelia replies that she did not know). Born between a Romanian father and an Italian mother.

When the Paris Flower Division members are being led into the prison, where she was detained, to recruit her, she takes Erica as hostage. However, because of Erica's comical yet sincere approach, she was confused and captured off guard. Even though Erica was taken hostage by her, Erica manages to heal her wounds, much to her surprise.

The only anti-hero throughout the three Flower Division, she joins the Paris Flower Division under the condition that her sentence would be reduced and a huge reward would be given with each dispatch (on the other hand, if she refuses to join, Grand-Mère has the right to do as she pleases, even to kill her).

She hesitates to intimate interaction with people, and often acts cold, selfish and irresponsible, in order to keep people from becoming close to her. However, to Erica, those actions had no effect. Because Erica keeps approaching her as a normal person worthy of attention, and because she cannot stop Erica from doing so, she has a hard time dealing with Erica. Even so, she does care for Erica. In Chapter 7 of the game, she baked a birthday cake for Erica, and in Chapter 8, contrary to her words, she searches for Erica.

Sakura Taisen: École De Paris shows how Lobelia and Erica first met; Lobelia, while being chased by the police, accidentally knocks Erica into a pile of trash. It also shows how she is captured before being recruited. After the attempt by Grand-Mère to capture her fails, Norimichi Sakomizu shoots a spiritual bullet through her heart. Because of her powers, she is only temporary paralyzed. After refusing an offer by Ogami, she is finally recruited by Grand-Mère.

She dances a gypsy dance as "Saphir" at Chattes Noires. Her dancing makes detective Évian a fan. She likes gambling and has extensive knowledge of whiskey and wine.

She uses a chain connected to her right arm as a whip, and also can conjure flame with her spiritual power. Her spiritual armor is equipped with a huge claw. Her Koubu-F originally had one huge extendable claw, but it was later revamped to the Koubu-F2 which had both arms instead of one equipped with the weapon.

==== Hanabi Kitaoji ====
Hanabi Kitaoji (北大路 花火, Kitaōji Hanabi)
Voiced by (Japanese): Yoshino Takamori
Voiced by (English): Elise Baughman (FUNimation)

A quiet and shy girl who came to Paris for her studies. Because the House of Kitaoji and the House of Bleumer are old acquaintances, the Bleumer family took care of her after her father Baron Kitaoji Masamichi left Paris. She has been good friends with Glycine since boarding school.

Because she has lived most of her life in France, she has a strong interest in Japan. She is well versed in Japanese manners and arts, however, her knowledge, although accurate, is mostly based on purely formal traditional manners gathered from books. Because of this, in comparison with the Teito Flower Division members, she is the closest to the typical image of the traditional Japanese woman (reserved, refined, and obedient to men). She dances at Chattes Noires as "Tatamisée Jeune" (roughly meaning a traditional "Japanese girl" in French).

She has aquaphobia, because of the trauma of losing her fiancé Philippe de Malebranche, in a ship wreck, on her wedding day. She wears a black dress as a mourning dress. She frequently visits Philippe's grave.

In Sakura Taisen: Le Nouveau Paris, Masamichi Kitaoji, Hanabi's father, comes to Paris for a surprise visit. During a mission as the Paris Flower Division, she and Coquelicot encounter him in front of Phillipe's grave. Although usually calm and composed, in trying to keep her involvement with the Paris Combat Revue a secret, she panics and starts finishing her father's sentence. In the game, while teaching Ogami Japanese Calligraphy, Ogami spills ink on his shirt. She starts taking off his shirt to prevent the stain, until she realized what she was doing.

=== Command & Support ===
Isabel "Grand-Mère" Lilac

Voiced by (Japanese): Keiko Aizawa
Voiced by (English): Juli Erickson

The owner of Chattes Noires and the commander of the Paris Combat Revue. She has channels to the French government. She is a very calm mature woman, yet has a sharp tongue. She has a black cat named Napoleon. She wants to make Ogami into a gentleman.

In Sakura Wars 3, if Ogami gains enough trust points from her, she tells Ogami about her late husband.

Norimichi Sakomizu (迫水 典通, Sakomizu Norimichi)

Voiced by (Japanese): Shinshō Nakamaru
Voiced by (English): Bill Flynn

The Paris Combat Revue and Arc de Triomphe's Station Chief. Sakomizu is France's Japanese ambassador. He is Ogami's senior officer and arranged Ogami to come to Paris. A great political strategist, he was known as "Sakomizu the Steel Wall" in Japan.

Ci Caprice (シー・カプリス, Shī Kapurisu)

Voiced by (Japanese): Mika Kanai
Voiced by (English): Luci Christian

A secretary of Grand-Mère, she also works at the shop in Chattes Noires. With Mell, they are the MC of the revue. She has a very easy going talking style, and unlike Mell, is an outgoing person, fitting for attending to customers. She likes making confectionery and originally came to Paris to become a patisserie. However, because she had neither connection nor skill, her dream is still unrealized. Became friends with Mell at the university. In the game, when told that she and Mell are a fine couple, her trust points will go up. If the player finish the game as "The Black Haired Noblemen", her ending is when she will bake Ogami a cake.

Mell Raison (メル・レゾン, Meru Rezon)

Voiced by (Japanese): Sachiko Kojima
Voiced by (English): Kate Borneman

She works as a secretary for Grand-Mère. With Ci, they are the MC of the revue at Chattes Noires. She was scouted by Grand-Mère, when she was attending a prestige university. Although she had enough credits to graduate, she left the university. A serious and punctual person, yet timid by nature, she tries to do everything by herself. Her hobbies are sewing and reading poetry. By finishing the game as "The Black Haired Noblemen", Ogami finds that Mell had a cut out picture of him in front of Chattes Noires.

Jean Leo (ジャン・レオ, Jan Reo)

Voiced by (Japanese): Shirō Saitō

He is the Maintenance crew chief for the Kagekidan. A strict professional when it comes to his job, he often scolds his subordinates. When Kohran visited Paris, he was impressed with Kohran's mechanical prowess. He likes drinking and gambling. Once, he invites Ogami to a horse race, but gets halted by Grand-Mère.

== New York Combat Revue ==
=== Star Division ===
==== Shinjiro Taiga ====
Shinjiro Taiga (大河 新次郎, Taiga Shinjirō)

Voiced by (Japanese): Hisayoshi Suganuma
Voiced by (English): Johnny Yong Bosch

He is the primary protagonist of Sakura Taisen 5 and the Sakura Taisen New York OVAs, and nephew of Ichiro Ogami. A young Navy lieutenant from Japan who becomes the captain of the New York Combat Revue. He is hardworking and dedicated to the samurai spirit, but is somewhat straightforward, which leads to problems. Compared to his uncle, he's easier to tease mainly due to his age, innocence and inexperience (especially with women). Shinjiro loves and honors his mother and frequently sends letters to her. He is talented physically and academically, and addresses every problem wholeheartedly. Shinjiro's mother is a caring woman who is a master swordsman and is very motherly, though she tends to go a bit overboard and teases Shinjiro just as much as the others do. After an incident involving a duel with Subaru, which he lost, he was forced to perform on stage as a girl named Petitmint (Peppermint in English). They often force him into the costume in the OVA having him perform Cleopatra.

==== Gemini Sunrise ====
Gemini Sunrise (ジェミニ・サンライズ, Jemini Sanraizu)

Voiced by (Japanese): Sanae Kobayashi
Voiced by (English): Laura Bailey

Fourth installment protagonist heroine. A cheerful but clumsy cowgirl who traveled from Texas to New York on her master's dying wish. She begins the game as the theater's cleaning girl who has dreams of one day performing and becoming a part of the Star Division and becoming a proper lady in the process. She has a very bright and friendly personality though she is prone to daydreaming. Gemini attempts to fit in with the people of New York but has a hard time due to her cowgirl personality. Because of this, she gets easily depressed whenever the other citizens see her as nothing more as a country hick, even considering moving back to Texas. Being trained as a samurai, she has a great love and respect for the Japanese culture and would love to travel to Japan herself someday.

She has a split-personality named Geminine who is aggressive and focused on avenging her master but honors the samurai code. Geminine was supposed to be a living person, however Gemini was the only one born and is described as having two hearts in one body. Geminine sometimes dominated the body when she was training with her master, though Gemini herself never knew of her existence until she got to New York where Geminine would dominate the body more often (which is mostly due to Gemini's depression). She has a white horse named Rally (Larry in the English-language version) that she keeps in her apartment but will occasionally ride him around New York. Gemini wields both a katana and a Colt Single Action Army revolver. Gemini is the main character of Sakura Wars V: Episode 0 as she saves Texas and makes her way to New York.

==== Sagiitta Weinberg ====
Sagiitta Weinberg (サジータ・ワインバーグ, Sajīta Wainbāgu; Cheiron Archer in the English-language version)

Voiced by (Japanese): Junko Minagawa
Voiced by (English): Erin Fitzgerald

An accomplished African-American lawyer from Harlem, who is also the leader of a local biker gang. Sagiitta (Cheiron) is hot-tempered and initially obsessed with the supremacy of the law. This was caused by an early case she took to help a friend who was framed, however she lost that case and he was subsequently arrested. Thus she sticks to the law as the only way to solve things. After Shinjiro and the others showed her otherwise, she mellows out while keeping her drive and even becomes an older sister figure to Rika. As she lightens up, she also starts having more fun with the other Star Division members and her old gang.

==== Diana Caprice ====
Diana Caprice (ダイアナ・カプリス, Daiana Kapurisu)

Voiced by (Japanese): Kaya Matsutani
Voiced by (English): Karen Strassman

A frail medical practitioner who wears glasses and is sometimes considered to be a wheelchair user. In the beginning of the game, she serves as Shinjiro's comfort when he's feeling troubled. The group learns that Diana is Sunnyside's niece and that Diana is slowly dying. Diana's spiritual power is so great that it is physically damaging to her body, which is the cause of her poor health, made worse by her already frail body. Because of this, Diana decides that she cannot fight the inevitable and wastes the rest of her life waiting on death. Diana extends this philosophy to the lives of others as well; her spiritual power allows her to sense when people (and animals, such as her beloved birds) will die, and she believes that nothing can be done to change this fate. It is not until Shinjiro and the others show her that she can fight her fate that she decides to walk and help the Star Division. She even decides to undergo surgery to save her life at the end of the game (which, as she shows up in the OVA, is successful).

==== Rikaritta Aries ====
Rikaritta Aries (リカリッタ・アリエス, Rikaritta Ariesu; Rosarita "Rosita" Aries in the English-language version)

Voiced by (Japanese): Ayaka Saito
Voiced by (English): Melissa Fahn

A Mexican singer, dancer, and despite her young age, bounty hunter. She wields twin Remington Model 1858 revolvers, one gold-plated and the other silver-plated. A very energetic young girl, she loves to play around with the others. Due to how she grew up, her knowledge of the world is somewhat limited. Rika is a perfectionist which is caused by when her father drowned in a flooding river. Rika has a very hearty appetite and will often eat a lot of food (which much of her bounty hunting money goes to). She carries around a pet weasel named Noko (Niccolo in the English version), which also (to the dismay of her teammates) serves as emergency rations in case she cannot find something to eat.

==== Subaru Kujō ====
Subaru Kujō (九条 昴, Kujō Subaru)

Voiced by (Japanese): Mie Sonozaki
Voiced by (English): Kate Higgins

Enigmatic and androgynous, Subaru was another member of the short-lived European Star Division alongside Ratchet. She is acknowledged as a genius, and said to have never been defeated in any form of competition or combat. As such, she tends to come off as a little arrogant and looks at everything in an analytical sense. Thus she takes an interest in things that she cannot comprehend completely such as Shinjiro's charisma and the concept of jazz music. Because of her looks, the others often wonder if Subaru is male or female, in which she responds that "Subaru is Subaru" and that gender is not important.

==== Ratchet Altair ====
Ratchet Altair (ラチェット・アルタイル, Rachetto Arutairu)

Voiced by: Akiko Kuno

A girl highly skilled in knife throwing. She appears first in Sakura Wars: The Movie, where she was revealed to be Leni and Orihime's former captain in the European Star Division. She then comes back as a supporting character in Sakura Wars: So Long, My Love. At the start, she is the captain of the New York Combat Revue but is noticeably starting to weaken due to her failing spiritual power. After naming Shinjiro as the acting leader, she is sidelined as the vice-commander under Sunnyside helping the others coordinate their missions. She has an air of maturity around her and is usually rational and calm in most situations, though is typically a no-nonsense woman. Ratchet is absent in the New York OVA as she is overseas to check on the Berlin division.

=== Rainbow Division ===
Plum Spaniel (プラム・スパニエル, Puramu Supanieru; Cherry Cocker in the English-language version)

Voiced by: Kaori Asō

A cheerful and beautiful young woman who works the bar at Little Lip Theater. She's a fun loving person who often teases Shinjiro by seducing him. Though her looks gets her the attention of several men, she had a man she loved who, unfortunately, ended up engaged to another woman. When an emergency arises, she supports the Star Division with another Rainbow Division member, Anri.

Anri Yoshino (吉野 杏里, Yoshino Anri)

Voiced by: Yōko Honna

The vendor at the shop inside Littlelip Theater. She also creates all of the stage costumes for the Star Division. She is extremely shy around most guys, but is very aggressive when dealing with Shinjiro. Her grandparents immigrated from Japan. As a member of the Rainbow Division, it is her duty to support the Star Division with Cherry in an emergency.

=== Command & Support ===
Michael Sunnyside (マイケル・サニーサイド, Maikeru Sanīsaido)

Voiced by: Naoya Uchida

The wealthiest man in New York, Sunnyside (his first name is never spoken in the game) owns the Little Lip Theatre and acts as the commander and financier of the New York Combat Revue (effectively combining the roles that General Yoneda and Count Hanakōji served in the first two games). Outwardly a flamboyant showman, he is actually a shrewd manipulator using this to either get what's necessary for the situation or to entice a certain reaction from someone. Either way, he only uses this side of him for the greater good. Sunnyside also acts as a caretaker to Diana Caprice, who calls him "Uncle Sunnyside".

Wong Xingzhi (Chinese: 王行智; pinyin: Wáng Xíngzhì)

Voiced by: Tetsuo Gotō

"Mr. Wong" is Sunnyside's assistant and the manager of the STAR maintenance team. He's an expert in Eastern medicine, including acupuncture, herbal remedies, and qigong. He plays a great role in the research and the development of STAR weapons.

== Shanghai Combat Revue ==
The Shanghai Combat Revue is one of the national anti-demon squadrons in Sakura Wars stationed in the municipality of Shanghai, China.

=== Wu Shenlong Division ===
Yang Xiaolong (Chinese: 楊小龍; pinyin: Yángxiǎolóng)

Voiced by: Yuichiro Umehara

Huang Yui (Chinese: 黃郁; pinyin: Huáng yù)

Voiced by (Japanese): Sumire Uesaka
Voiced by (English): Kate Bristol

== London Combat Revue ==
The London Combat Revue is one of the national anti-demon squadrons in Sakura Wars stationed in London, England.

=== Round Table Division ===
Arthur (アーサー, Āsā)

Voiced by (Japanese): Nobunaga Shimazaki
Voiced by (English): Stephen Fu

Lancelot (ランスロット, Ransurotto)

Voiced by (Japanese): Manami Numakura
Voiced by (English): Felecia Angelle

== Berlin Combat Revue ==
The Berlin Combat Revue is one of the national anti-demon squadrons in Sakura Wars stationed in Berlin, Germany.

=== Schwarzschild Division ===
Elise (エリス, Erisu)

Voiced by (Japanese): Nana Mizuki
Voiced by (English): Emily Neves

Margarethe (マルガレーテ, Marugarēte)

Voiced by: Rie Kugimiya

== Civilians ==
=== Japan ===
Kojiro Akechi

Miki Akechi

=== France ===
Jim Évian (ジム・エビヤン, Jimu Ebiyan)

Voiced by (Japanese): Kōzō Shioya

A bumbling detective of the Paris Police. He frequently chases after Lobelia but every time he manages to capture her, she escapes a few hours later. After the Paris Combat Revue recruits Lobelia, he becomes a Saphir fan, not realizing that she is really Lobelia under disguise.

Elsa Flaubert

Bernadette Simons

Morgan Camus

Ringmaster Denicourt

Gaclton

Karuchera

Count Riche

Madam Tarebou

Phillipe

=== United States ===
Juanita Cushing (フワニータ・カッシング, Fuwanīta Kasshingu)

Voiced by (Japanese): Ikue Ōtani

Brad Basileus (ブレッド・バシレウス, Bureddo Bashireusu)

Voiced by (Japanese): Yūji Kishi

Chamber Westwood (チェンバー・ウェストウッド, Chenbā Wesutouddo)

Voiced by (Japanese): Naoki Bando

Chamber is an old friend of Gemini and captain of the Texas Cavalry. He has 9 children, and his dream is to manage them as a baseball team. After the Eden incident, Chamber becomes President of the United States.

== Villains ==
Some of these characters have been based on actual historical figures, such as Tenkai, Okubo Nagayasu, and Oda Nobunaga.

A variation on these characters was used in the television series (see the section on the series below).

=== Hive of Darkness ===
- Tenkai (天海)
  The leader of the Hive of Darkness (黒之巣会, Kuronosu-kai) and a demon general who survived the aftermath of the Demon War who serves at the main antagonist of the first part of Sakura Wars. He also seems to have some history with Ikki Yoneda, since he demanded the general as a hostage during the time he besieged Tokyo. Tenkai is based on the historical Buddhist high priest Tenkai, a member of Tokugawa Ieyasu's staff. He is voiced by Katsuhisa Hōki.

==== Lords of Death ====
- Black/Aoi Satan (黒き/葵 叉丹, Kuroki/Aoi Satan)
  Tenkai's lieutenant and one of the four Lords of Death (黒之巣死天王, Kuronosu Shitennō) who serves as the main antagonist of the second part of Sakura Wars. As a member of the Hive of Darkness, he uses the name Kuroki Satan (Black Satan); when he returns as the leader of the Kouma, he uses the name Aoi Satan (Blue Satan). He is later revealed to be the biblical Satan, the King of Darkness who was cast down from Heaven. It was also revealed that Satan was responsible for reviving Tenkai, who actually died during the Demon War. In Sakura Wars 2 (and in the TV series), he is revealed to be Shinnosuke Yamazaki, a member of the original Anti-Kouma Squad, an engineering genius, and Ayame's lover. He is voiced by Hiroshi Yanaka.
- Jade Setsuna (蒼き刹那, Aoki Setsuna)
  One of the four Lords of Death. Setsuna appears as a male human 10-year-old child wearing a blue robe and cape, with mop-like hair and long, sharp fingernails that he uses as weapons in battle. Cunning and manipulative, Setsuna targets his victims' weaknesses before he strikes. Despite his childlike appearance, he is the older brother of the hulking Rasetsu. He is voiced by Akira Ishida.
- Crimson Miroku (紅のミロク, Kurenai no Miroku)
  One of the four Lords of Death and the only female among them. Miroku dresses in flowing red robes and styles her black hair in a variation of the Shimada style. She is voiced by Yumi Hikita.
- Silver Rasetsu (白銀の羅刹, Hakugin no Rasetsu)
  One of the four Lords of Death. A tall, muscular brute with chalk-white skin and an orange mohawk, Rasetsu prefers to cause outright destruction and mayhem. He is the younger brother of Setsuna. He is voiced by Hideaki Ono in the Japanese version of the videogames and by Hisao Egawa in Sakura Wars: In Hot Blood.

=== Aoi Satan's Group ===
==== Three Knights of Twilight ====
- Inoshishi (猪)
  (Inoshishi means boar, which refers to one component of a difficult to achieve winning combination in Hanafuda along with Shika and Cho). He is voiced by Shinpachi Tsuji.
- Shika (鹿)
  (Shika means deer, which refers to one component of a difficult to achieve winning combination in Hanafuda along with Cho and Ino). He is voiced by Tōru Ōkawa.
- Cho (蝶, Chō)
  (Cho means butterfly, which refers to one component of a difficult to achieve winning combination in Hanafuda along with Shika and Ino). Cho is fiercely loyal to Satan and possibly in love with him. Cho views Ayame as a rival for Satan's affection. He is voiced by Akira Ishida.

==== Others ====
- Aya-me (殺女)
  Aya-me is the corrupted form of Ayame Fujieda. In this incarnation, she has the appearance of a fallen angel and her name is written as 殺女 ("killing-woman," also pronounced Ayame). Called the strongest Kouma, she is completely loyal to Satan, although a fraction of the original Ayame's personality shines through. Her good side eventually shines through and she rescues Ogami from death at the cost of her own life if you choose to spare her. Aya-me also appears as an antagonist in the tactical RPG, Project X Zone and its sequel, Project X Zone 2. She, like her other self, is voiced by Ai Orikasa.

=== Black Demon Society ===
- Keigo Kyogoku
  A powerful general in the Imperial Army and the true leader of the Black Demon Society who serves as the main antagonist of Sakura Wars 2. He resurrected Kazuma Shinguji (a.k.a. Oni-Ou) using the anti-soul technique, who in turn resurrected Yamazaki. Using Oni-Ou as a figurehead, Kyogoku organized attacks, overt and covert, on the Japanese government with both his supporters within the Imperial Army and the Black Demon Society. Kyogoku's ultimate goal was to overthrow the Japanese government, replacing it with a military dictatorship under his command. After a battle with the player, which is the game's final battle, Kyogoku is killed. He is voiced by Akira Kamiya.
- Oni-Ou (Japanese: demon king)
  The supposed leader of the Black Demon Society. Oni-Ou constantly wears a horned Hannya mask over his face. He is actually Kazuma Shinguji, a member of the original Anti-Kouma Squad who died near the end of the Demon War and the late father of Sakura Shinguji. Kazuma was revived and mind-controlled by Keigo Kyogoku (see below) to be a powerful slave through the Hangon no Jutsu (反魂の術; lit. 'anti-soul technique.') During the game's final battle, Kyogoku's control over Kazuma is broken. However, mere moments later, Kazuma sacrifices himself to save his daughter from a vicious attack by Kyogoku. He is voiced by Nachi Nozawa.

==== The Five Black Oni ====
- Kongou
  One of the Five Black Oni, his element is metal. Kongou is a large, tan-skinned, muscular man who dresses in a beige jacket. He has a romantic crush on his fellow Society member, Suiko. He is voiced by Fumihiko Tachiki.
- Mokujiki
  One of the Five Black Oni, his element is wood. A ninety-nine-year-old elderly human man wearing ornate green robes, Mokujiki moves around using a floating platform. He is voiced by Jōji Yanami.
- Tsuchigumo
  One of the Five Black Oni, her element is earth. A six-armed female spider-like humanoid, Tsuchigumo carries and uses several different weapons at once and uses web attacks. Her appearance suggests a demonic heritage. She is voiced by Misa Watanabe.
- Kasha
  One of the Five Black Oni, his element is fire. A pyromaniac, Kasha dresses in a business suit with a red overcoat. He is voiced by Toshihiko Seki.
- Suiko
  One of the Five Black Oni, her element is water. Using the connections of her master, Keigo Kyogoku, Suiko becomes a military adjutant and is placed within the Floral Assault Group as Saki Kageyama. As Saki, Suiko assists the Imperial Combat Revue with administration. Her true mission, however, was to observe and report on the movements of greatest possible threat to the Black Demon Society. She once attempted to assassinate General Yoneda with a sniper rifle. Suiko is killed in battle after she attempted to turn Reni against her friends. She is voiced by Rei Sakuma.

==== Others ====
- Shinnosuke Yamazaki
  Revived in the same manner as Oni-Ou, he and the Combat Revue engage in battle, but Oni-ou kills Yamazaki by impaling his sword through his chest moments later. He is voiced by Hiroshi Yanaka.

=== Sakura Wars 3 Villains ===
==== Phantom ====
- Salut
  The spirit of the city of Paris who serves as the main antagonists of Sakura Wars 3, Salut wishes to bring France back to its days before the Roman Empire conquered the country, in order to recreate Gaul (ancient France). Salut appears a young girl with blonde hair dressed in a colorful jester's costume, with the left half of her face painted white. She is voiced by Minami Takayama.
- Derunie

==== Phantoms of Paris ====
- Duke Calmar
  A fat, blue-skinned, squid-like humanoid who is of the main antagonists of Sakura Wars 3, Duke Calmar desired to rule Paris on his own terms. When he relaxes, Calmar enjoys smoking tobacco through a hookah. When he first appears, Calmar revives Ciseaux, Python, Leon, Nadel, and Masque de Corbeau from the dead, briefly catching the Paris Assault Group off guard and holding much of Paris in chaos for a time. Calmar then organizes the antagonists into a crime syndicate under his leadership, ordering them to cause further destruction to Paris in order to keep the citizens in fear. After the Paris Assault Group defeat and kill his subordinates (again!), Calmar attempts to take matters into his own hands in a final battle and is eventually defeated. He is voiced by Tōru Ōhira.
- Ciseaux
  A short, deranged, rabbit-like humanoid who prefers to attack with a giant pair of scissors. He dislikes seeing people happy and being called "Rabbit". Ciseaux appears to have control over rabbits of all sorts, though he appears to be satisfied with causing small-scale damage. Like Aya-me, he is an antagonist in Project X Zone and Project X Zone 2. He is voiced by Wataru Takagi.
- Python
  A deceptively beautiful woman from the Middle East whose face turns snake-like when angry or excited. She masqueraded as an animal trainer at Coquelicot's circus, managing to get on Coquelicot's good side Karuchera as to the point where Coquelicot began calling her. A jewel thief by nature, Python is fascinated with—and enjoys eating—precious gems of all kinds. She has no qualms about killing, especially where jewels are concerned—for instance, killing the ringmaster of Coquelicot's circus when he refused to give up the jewel embedded in his top hat. She is voiced by Atsuko Tanaka.
- Leon
  A eyepatch-wearing, lion-like humanoid who is obsessed with nobility to the point of believing that he himself was the only one worthy of being called a noble. Arrogant and condescending, Leon gives little thought to the lives of "common people". He abducted nobles that he considered unworthy of their ranks and imprisoned them in the sewer systems of Paris. Leon had arranged a marriage with Glycine in a plot to inherit the Bleumer family's fortune for his own selfish gain. However, the plan backfired after Oogami challenged Leon to a duel and won, causing an enraged Leon to reveal his true nature. He is voiced by Yoshisada Sakaguchi.
- Nadel
  A pliers-themed, scorpion-like thief obsessed with works of art, Nadel enjoys "improving" priceless paintings by slashing them to ribbons. Upon being confronted, she attempted to negotiate with her old acquaintance Lobelia to team up, offering her half of Paris, but Lobelia rejected the offer at the last minute. When cornered in the Louvre, Nadel threatened to tear the irreplaceable painting, the Mosa Lina (a mimic picture of the Mona Lisa). However, to everyone's surprise, Lobelia burned Nadel's "hostage" to ash (though it turned out that the Mosa Lina at the museum was a fake). She is voiced by Yuri Amano.
- Masque de Corbeau
  A mysteriously dramatic and overly theatrical man (?) dressed in elegant black clothing and a crow-like helmet. Adept at mental manipulation and at creating illusions, Masque de Corbeau enjoys watching (and replaying, through hypnosis) the past tragedies of his victims, drinking in their despair before killing them. Corbeau is especially infatuated with Hanabi and her obsession with her deceased fiancé. He abducted her and brought her to the theater, but was thwarted by the Paris Flower Division. Even after being rejected by Hanabi, Corbeau pledged his heart to her. He is voiced by Yūji Mitsuya.

=== Brent Furlong ===
- Brent Furlong
  The main antagonist of Sakura Wars: The Movie, he is the president of the Douglas-Stewart Company who manufactures the supposedly "un-manned" demon-powered Japhkiels. He constantly belittles Tokyo, referring it as "weak", compared to the "grandeur" of New York City. He is voiced by Koichi Yamadera in the Japanese version of the movie and Crispin Freeman (credited as Joseph McDougal) in the English version.

=== Okubo Nagaysu ===
- Okubo Nagayasu
  The main antagonist of Sakura Wars 4. A former mining magistrate of Edo (ancient Tokyo) during the reign of Tokugawa Ieyasu, he feels that "his" city has lost its spirit, so he intends to conquer Tokyo and bring it back to its days during the Sengoku period. Okubo wears black Japanese courtier's robes in the style of the Sengoku period and carries an antique fan, but his most distinctive feature is the Noh mask he wears, which has a cracked hole in place of the left eye. Only a black, bottomless void could be seen within this hole. Okubo is voiced by series creator Hiroi Oji

=== Sakura Wars V - Episode 0 ===
- Patrick Hamilton
  The main antagonist of Sakura Wars V: Episode 0, he is a very powerful western sorcerer who intends to remake Eden by using Juanita Cushing & her powers. Originally seen in Sakura Wars: The Movie as one of Brent Furlong's henchmen, he was presumably shot dead by Maria, using a special spirit-power infused bullet, but he was somehow revived (probably with his own black magic) for Sakura Wars V: Episode 0. He is voiced by Keiichi Nanba.
- Synclair Gardner
  The red knight and the only female member in Patrick's three knights. She does not like being called "Calamity" because she killed the entire Seventh Cavalry corps except Brad, who was absent during that time of the massacre. She is voiced by Kaho Kōda.
- Chusahna Cycles
  The white knight of Patrick's men. He may look like a young kid, but he is a great sharpshooter. He is voiced by Makoto Tsumura
- Leonidus Vandorn
  The black knight of Patrick's men. He is voiced by Kosei Hirota.

=== Sakura Wars V ===
- Oda Nobunaga
  Known in history as one of the most powerful and influential daimyō in Japan during the Sengoku period, Nobunaga somehow revives in New York City. Still burning with ambition, Nobunaga intends to eventually conquer the world, starting with the United States of America. Nobunaga's flying fortress and base of operations, Azuchi Castle, is named after the castle that was destroyed in fire shortly after the daimyō's death during the Sengoku period. He is voiced by Jūrōta Kosugi in Japanese.
- Ranmaru
  As Nobunaga's varlet and most loyal lieutenant, Ranmaru was completely devoted to carrying out the will of his lord. Although he is truly male, Ranmaru appeared as a 12-year-old girl in a black dress with short green hair, white skin and rabbit ears. He carries a scythe as a weapon. He is voiced by Kiyomi Asai in Japanese.
- Dokuro-bou
  A tall, muscular man with purple skin dressed in the robes of a Buddhist priest, Dokuro-bou also wears a faceplate resembling a hockey mask and appears to have a short katana pierced horizontally within his head. Although he fancies himself as a brilliant tactician, Dokuro-bou is actually very stupid and is prone to losing his temper easily. His near-limitless strength is legendary and he carries a kanabo, a steel club, in battle. He is voiced by Daisuke Egawa in Japanese.
- Tsugarubi
  A man with long, grey hair in a purple kimono, Tsugarubi affects the image of an immaculate, composed gentleman. He usually conceals his gem-like eyes behind a ceremonial cloth. When his eyes are uncovered, they have the power to turn living targets to stone by stealing their ki. Tsugaru-bi appears to hold a particular hatred for women in general, who are often the targets of his ki-stealing attacks. He is voiced by Masatoyo Tetsuno in Japanese.
- Kokuryuhime (Japanese: Black Dragon Princess)
  A tall woman with blond hair wearing black plate armor and carrying a huge sword, Kokuryuhime is a general in Nobunaga's army driven by her own twisted sense of justice and is nicknamed as the "Selfish Queen." Among all of Nobunaga's lieutenants, her swordsmanship is the best. She is voiced by Romi Park in Japanese.
- Yumedono
  Draped in a loose crimson robe and wearing a large, tall hat that covers the upper half of her face, Yumedono has the unique abilities to control insects and use poisons with a variety of effects. She is extremely vain about her appearance and enjoys belittling others in this respect. Yume-dono's personal goal is to make New York into a nest for her beloved insects. She is voiced by Sakiko Uran in Japanese.

=== Sakura Wars: Le Nouveau Paris ===
- Count Tournell
- MI6 Intelligence

=== Sakura Wars OVA 5 New York NY ===
- Tutankhamen
  A mysterious ancient Egyptian who wears the Eye of Horus around his neck and serves as the main antagonist of the OVA. He wants to become the new sun god, and has the power to summon living mummies, as well as mecha in the form of Egyptian gods such as Anubis. He apparently lived over 3000 years ago, can turn people into sand and himself dissolves into sand when weakened. In the Fourth episode he reveals himself to be none other than Tutankhamen. He takes interest in Shinjiro and Petitmint (unaware that they are the same person) who closely resembles Cleopatra who attempted to stop him years ago. He is voiced by Hiroshi Kamiya.
- Bastet
  The Egyptian cat goddess, she is assisting the mysterious Egyptian in his quest to become the new sun god. She is voiced by Hiromi Konno.

=== Sakura Wars Television Series ===
The enemy characters of the television series version are a variation on those of the Sakura Wars 1 game listed above. The group is collectively known as the Black Sanctum Council.

- Aoi Satan
  Originally he was Major Yamazaki, a former comrade of General Yoneda in the Anti-Kouma Squad who created the concept design for the Koubu suits. At the end of the Demon War, Yamazaki went mad and allowed himself to be corrupted by the power of darkness. Reborn as Satanaoi, he leads the Black Sanctum Council to revive Tenkai so he can watch the utter destruction of Tokyo and those who mocked him in his former life. It is strongly hinted that Ayame, his teammate in the Anti-Kouma Squad, loved him deeply before he went evil. His Japanese voice actor is Hiroshi Yanaka.
- Crimson Miroku
  One of the four Lords of Death. Miroku is a pale woman who dresses in flowing red robes and originally wore her hair in the typical geisha style. Being killed by Sumire, Miroku develops a personal hatred for Sumire that she acts on upon her resurrection by Satanoi. Her Japanese voice actor is Yumi Hikata.
- Setsuna
  One of the four Lords of Death, childlike in appearance despite being Rasetsu's older brother. Cunning and manipulative, Setsuna prefers to target his victims' weaknesses before he strikes. His Japanese voice actor is Akira Ishida.
- Rasetsu
  One of the four Lords of Death. A violent masked brute, Rasetsu prefers to cause outright destruction and mayhem, especially when his mask is removed. He is the younger brother of Setsuna, who commands him. His Japanese voice actor is Hisao Egawa.

== Reception ==
The characters from Sakura Wars have received mixed responses by publications for manga, anime and other media. Reviewing the TV series, Mark Thomas from Mania Entertainment enjoyed the characters, most notably Setsuna. Chris Beverdige (also from Mania) liked Sakura as well as her interactions with the other characters. Carlos Ross from THEM Anime Reviews agreed with Thomas despite finding some of the characters undeveloped at first and noted how they become "decent" during the show. DVD Verdict's Judge Adam Arsenea criticized the "lame, character developing episodes that fail to actually do anything interesting." On the other hand, Todd Douglass Jr. from DVD Talk praised the character development in the series stating "A rich degree of character development starts from the very first episode and does not really let go for the entire series." Nevertheless, Douglass shared Arsenea's comments about some of the characters being boring. Anime News Network writer Zac Bertschy was far more negative calling them "so uninteresting to watch."
