= Kumiko Nishihara =

Japanese voice actress (born 1965)

- 西原 久美子
- Born: April 27, 1965 (age 61); Chigasaki, Kanagawa, Japan
- Occupation: Voice actress
- Years active: 1984–present
- Agent: Aoni Production

Kumiko Nishihara (西原 久美子, Nishihara Kumiko; née Watanabe (渡辺), born April 27, 1965) is a Japanese voice actress from Chigasaki, Kanagawa affiliated with Aoni Production also known for her work on the stage and Iris Chateaubriand from Sakura Wars.

== Biography ==
While a student at Wako University, Nishihara attended voice acting classes run by Kaneta Kimotsuki. When Kimotsuki established Theater Company 21st Century Fox (劇団21世紀FOX, Gekidan Niju Isseiki Fox) in 1984, Nishihara went on to leave her undergraduate studies unfinished to become a founding member, taking numerous roles as a leading actress in several productions and appearing in the lead role of Alice from Alice in Wonderland three times. Theatre Company 21st Century Fox became known for producing numerous voice actors with a theatre background such as Kaneta, Nishihara, and Kappei Yamaguchi. Nishihara took on voice acting roles in anime starting with Little Memole and becoming known for major voice acting roles in anime such as Hello! Lady Lynn, Sailor Moon Sailor Stars, and s-CRY-ed, in addition to voice acting roles in a number of Japanese games. Nishihara is known for taking on voice acting roles involving high pitched female voices and a great deal of singing, leading to appearances on the Japanese music variety show Utaban aired by the Tokyo Broadcasting Corporation.

With her departure from 21st Century Fox in 2004 and transfer of her voice acting work to Aoni Production, Nishihara shifted emphasis from her previously prolific voice acting in anime and the Japanese gaming industry to her stage career. In 2006 together with Junko Okada, Nishihara founded the Liddel Project as an experiment in independent theatre. Nishihara went on to take roles with the newly established Blanc Chat (遊々団ブランシャ・ヴェール, Yuyudan Blansha Veru), appearing in their first production, Fractal and a production of Alice in Wonderland as the Black Queen. Nishihara continues to be active in contemporary Japanese theatre. Her most recent work with Blanc Chat is Final Week, their 14th production since establishment and she is scheduled to appear in a series of Liddel Project performances from November 2012 in Tokyo.

== Filmography ==
=== Anime ===
1984

- Little Memole (Pi)
- Oyoneko Boonyan (Neko Girl)

1985

- Hai Step Jun (Yukinojou)

1986

- Anmitsu Hime (Kinako)

1987

- Esper Mami (Youko)
- Kiteretsu Daihyakka (Boy C)
- Norakuro-kun (Hiroko)

1988

- Hello! Lady Lynn (Lynn Russell)

1989

- Akuma-kun (Red Pixie, Yuko)
- Obocchamakun (Youji Dentatsu)
- The Adventures of Hutch the Honeybee (Choko)
- Time Travel Tondekeman (Yumi Arama)
- Dash! Yonkuro (Anna Kawai)
- Magical Hat (Roboggu)
- Madō King Granzort (Noa)
- Sally the Witch (Poron)
- Warau Salesman (Shain, Matsumoto suzu ko)

1990

- NG Knight Ramune & 40 (Ure P)
- Chinpui (Kiki, Yuki Daruma)
- Anpanman (Omochatenshi (Shodai), Doseichan)
- Pygmalio (Eruza)
- Magical Taruruto-kun (Mimora)
- Magical Angel Sweet Mint (Daisy)
- Mōretsu Atarō (Reina)
- My Daddy Long Legs (Cindy Paterson)
- Brave Exkaiser (Mian Oujo)
- RPG Densetsu Hepoi (Kyassuru Princess)

1991

- Jankenman (Otenki)
- The Brave Fighter of Sun Fighbird (Tomita Youko)
- 21 Emon (Ochin)
- Moero! Top Striker (Anna)

1992

- Ashita e Free Kick (Elena Lolabrigita, Kotani Michi, Kurihara Rumi)
- Jeanie with the Light Brown Hair (Mora)
- Crayon Shin-chan (Shinobu)
- Tomatoman (Papaiya Hime)
- Super Bikkuriman (Little Minos)
- Papuwa (Kuriko)
- Floral Magician Mary Bell (Picchi, Mirii, Rozu, Yousei A)
- Magical Princess Minky Momo (Rami)
- Ah -- Harima-nada (Rie, Tarou)

1993

- Mobile Suit Victory Gundam (Rena No Musume)
- Ghost Sweeper Mikami (Meiko Rokudou)
- Soreike! Anpanman (Denchi-kun, Harukaze-san)
- Dragon Ball Z (Angela)

1994

- Tama and Friends (Girl)
- The Adventures of Tom Sawyer (anime) (Becky)
- Sailor Moon S (U . Tomodachi)

1995

- Wedding Peach (Shizuka)
- Saint Tail (Yuriko)
- Mobile Suit Gundam Wing (Silvia Noventa)
- Kuma no Pūtarō (Kaze Musume)
- Juu Senshi Garukiba (Rika Misaku)
- Sailor Moon SuperS (Diana)
- Bit The Cupid (Reda)

1996

- Remi, Nobody's Girl (Nina)
- Those Who Hunt Elves (Milliea)
- Hell Teacher Nūbē (Toshoshitsu No Shoujo Rei)
- Sailor Moon Sailor Stars (Diana)
- Brave Command Dagwon (Fujii Yukari)
- Rurouni Kenshin (Mikan)
- YAT Anshin! Uchū Ryokō (Wakun, Young Mama)

1997

- Cutie Honey Flash (Amazon Panther)
- Revolutionary Girl Utena (Shiori Takatsuki)
- Cho Mashin Hero Wataru (Shinobibe Sakuya)
- Yume no Crayon Oukoku (Oparu Ouhi)

1998

- Vampire Princess Miyu (Shizuko)
- Record of Lodoss War (Pirotess)

1999

- Kamikaze Kaito Jeanne (Finn Fish, Pakkyaramao)
- Ojamajo Doremi (Dodo)

2000

- Sakura Wars TV (Iris Chateaubriand)
- Pipopapo Patrol-kun (Patto)
- Pokémon (Makoto)

2001

- Haré+Guu (Mary)
- s-CRY-ed (Ayase Terada)

2002

- Digimon Frontier (Lucemon, Lucemon Larva)
- One Piece (Kodama)

2003

- Rumic Theater (Aizaki's girlfriend)
- Pokémon Advanced (Naoko)
- Mermaid Melody Pichi Pichi Pitch (Yukie)

2004

- Detective Conan (Otsusawa Mami)
- Aichi Banpaku No Masumedeia (Kitsune)
- Monster (Dancer)

2005

- Gun Sword (Shino)
- Crayon Shin-chan (Raben Takamobi)

2006

- Kujibiki Unbalance (Renko Kamishakujii)
- Crayon Shin-chan (Kuriningu Mise No Arubaito)
- Yu-Gi-Oh! Duel Monsters GX (Alice)

2007

- Crayon Shin-chan (Josei, Josei Tenin A)
- Genshiken 2 (Renko Kamishakuji)
- Hatara Kizzu Maihamu Gumi (Nikaidou Erika)
- Bikkuriman (Chou Hijiri Kami Deiana)
- Les Misérables: Shōjo Cosette (Hahaoya)

2008

- Yes! Precure 5 GoGo! (Princess Crepe)
- Odenkun (Saotome Usagi)
- Kanokon (Minori Mitama)
- Crayon Shin-chan (Takuhaibin)
- Hakaba Kitarō (Pepe ko, Aka ei)
- Porphy no Nagai Tabi (Jieshika)
- One Piece (Perona, Negative Horo)

2010

- Crayon Shin-chan (Douryou)
- Dragon Ball Kai (Pizza)

2011

- Karl to Fushigi na Tō (Pipu)
- Suite PreCure (Crescendo Tone)
- Chibi Maruko-chan (Kumiko-chan)
- Doraemon (OL)
- One Piece (Kizoku No Musume)

2012

- Chibi Maruko-chan (Girl)
- Crayon Shin-chan (Woman, SHIN-MEN, Pimawarimama)

2013

- Dokidoki! PreCure (Sharuru)

2015

- Shinmai Maou no Testament (Shella)

=== Original video animation (OVA) ===
- Agent Aika (Black Leader)
- Ayane's High Kick (Kayoko Nakajima)
- Interlude (Kimura Chika)
- The Legend of Heroes: Trails in the Sky The Animation (Renne)
- Over Rev! (Aika Katayama)
- Kakyūsei (Teina)
- Canary (anime) (Yahagi Sena)
- Can Can Bunny Extra (Shuree)
- Cool Devices (Maya Mizutani)
- Stainless Night (Sayaka)
- Ganbare Goemon Jigen Shiro No Akumu (Teshita, Uinbi)
- Kishin Corps (Taichou)
- Mobile Suit Gundam SEED Astray (Loretta Adja)
- Shoujo-sama Chikara Marusama - Konpei Shima No Ryuu (Tanuki Kouji Sakurako)
- Sakura Wars OVA (Iris Chateaubriand)
- Sakura Wars OVA 2 (Iris Chateaubriand)
- Sakura Wars: Sumire (OVA) (Iris Chateaubriand)
- Genocyber (Meru)
- Majin Eiyuu Den Watarushirizu (Kaji Bu Tonari)
- Zetsuai 1989 (Izumi Ashi Kaori)
- Twin Signal (Otoi Minoru)
- Twin Bee Paradise (Winbee)
- Honō no Haramase Tenkōsei (Fujino Mami)
- Dragon Fist (Fuyuka)
- Dragon Ball: Yo! Son Goku and His Friends Return!! (Gure)
- Nangoku Shounen Papuwa-kun (Kuriko)
- Maya The Honey Bee OVA (Maya)
- Babel II (Leah)
- Burn Up! (Yuka)
- Fortune Quest (Rumy)
- Project A-Ko 4: Final (Joseito B)
- Ryokunohara Labyrinth: Sparkling Phantom (Fhalei Rue)
- Detective Conan Magic File (Shougakkou No Sensei)
- Moldiver (Vivien)

=== Anime films ===
- Akuma-kun (Child, Red Pixie)
- Akuma-kun: Yōkoso Akuma Land e!! (Welcome Pixie, Red Devil)
- Umeboshi Denka (Miyoko Kawai)
- Eiga Suite Precure: Torimodose! Kokoro ga Tsunagu Kiseki no Melody (Crescendo Tone)
- Ghost Sweeper Mikami Film (Meiko Rokudou)
- Sakura Wars The Movie (Iris Chateaubriand)
- Revolutionary Girl Utena: The Movie (Shiori Takatsuki)
- Scryed Alteration I Tao (Ayase Terada)
- Scryed Alteration II Quan (Ayase Terada)
- Zouressha ga Yatte Kita (Poppo-chan)
- Dr. Slump: Dr. Mashirito and Abale-chan (Galleria-chan)
- Doraemon: Nobita and the Animal Planet (Romi)
- Doraemon: Nobita and the Wind Wizard (Sun)
- 2112: The Birth of Doraemon (Dora first king)
- Sailor Moon Super S: The Movie (Diana)
- Paul Rush: The Father of Kiyosato Plateau Over Dream (Mariko)

=== Video games ===
- Idol Janshi Suchie-Pai (Sayuri Kawamoto, Milky pie)
- Interlude (visual novel) (Kimura Senka)
- Ys vs. Trails in the Sky (Renne)
- The Legend of Heroes: Trails in the Sky SC (Renne)
- The Legend of Heroes: Trails from Zero (Renne)
- Only You: Li Cruz (Mucha-Karenina)
- Elf-ban Kakyūsei (Teina)
- Canary Visual Novel (Sena Yahagi)
- Kujibiki Unbalance: Kaichō Onegai Smash Fight (Renko Kamishakujii)
- Grandia (Sue)
- Green Green 3 Hello Goodbye (Kagetsu Tenjin)
- Game Heaven Series (Yuki Ito, boss etc. and sound effects that appear in the game as well)
- Genso no Artemis (Moe Himejima)
- Sakura Taisen (Iris Chateaubriand)
- Sakura Taisen 2 ~Kimi, Shinitamou koto Nakare~ (Iris Chateaubriand)
- Sakura Taisen 3 ~Pari wa Moeteiru ka~ (Iris Chateaubriand)
- Sakura Taisen 4 ~Koi Seyo, Otome~ (Iris Chateaubriand)
- Sakura Taisen Hanagumi Taisen Columns (Iris Chateaubriand)
- Sakura Taisen Hanagumi Taisen Columns 2 (Iris Chateaubriand)
- Suzume Tei Monogatari 2 Uchu Tantei Deiban Shutsudo-hen (Motoko)
- Super Smash Bros. Ultimate (Mii Fighter Type 8)
- Ranma ½ Battle Renaissance (Rougé)
- Chu: Kana Suzume Samurai Tenho Pai Musume (Tanuko)
- Another Step Genie Super Hero Wataru (Ninbu Sakuya)
- I Wanted To Tell You a Story ... Twins (Kano Momiji)
- TwinBee Yahho! (Winbee, Flute)
- Tail Concerto (Stare Pris)
- Tales of Phantasia - Full Voice Edition - (Maria Albein)
- Tales of Fandom Vol.1 (Maria Albein)
- Device Reign (Yukari Mibu)
- Doraemon Yuujou Densetsu Zadora Emonzu (Dora The King)
- Dragon Master Silk (Ki)
- Nurse Story (Aoyama Medaka)
- Haru no Ashioto (Chika Shinomiya)
- Power DoLLS: Detachment of Limited Line Service (Selma Scheele)
- Sailor Moon Video Game Series (Diana)
- Farland Saga series (Lisa, Mel)
- Yukyu Gensokyoku (Melody Sinclair)
- Yumimi Mix (Rie Morishita)
- Rio Paradise (Mint)
- Lunar: Eternal Blue (Ruby)
- Lunar 2: Eternal Blue Complete (Ruby)
- Romancing SaGa - Minstrel Song - (Marine)
- Makeruna! Makendō 2 (Manenbo & Sakkarin)
