= Royal Bank Building (Victoria, British Columbia) =

Building in Victoria, British Columbia, Canada

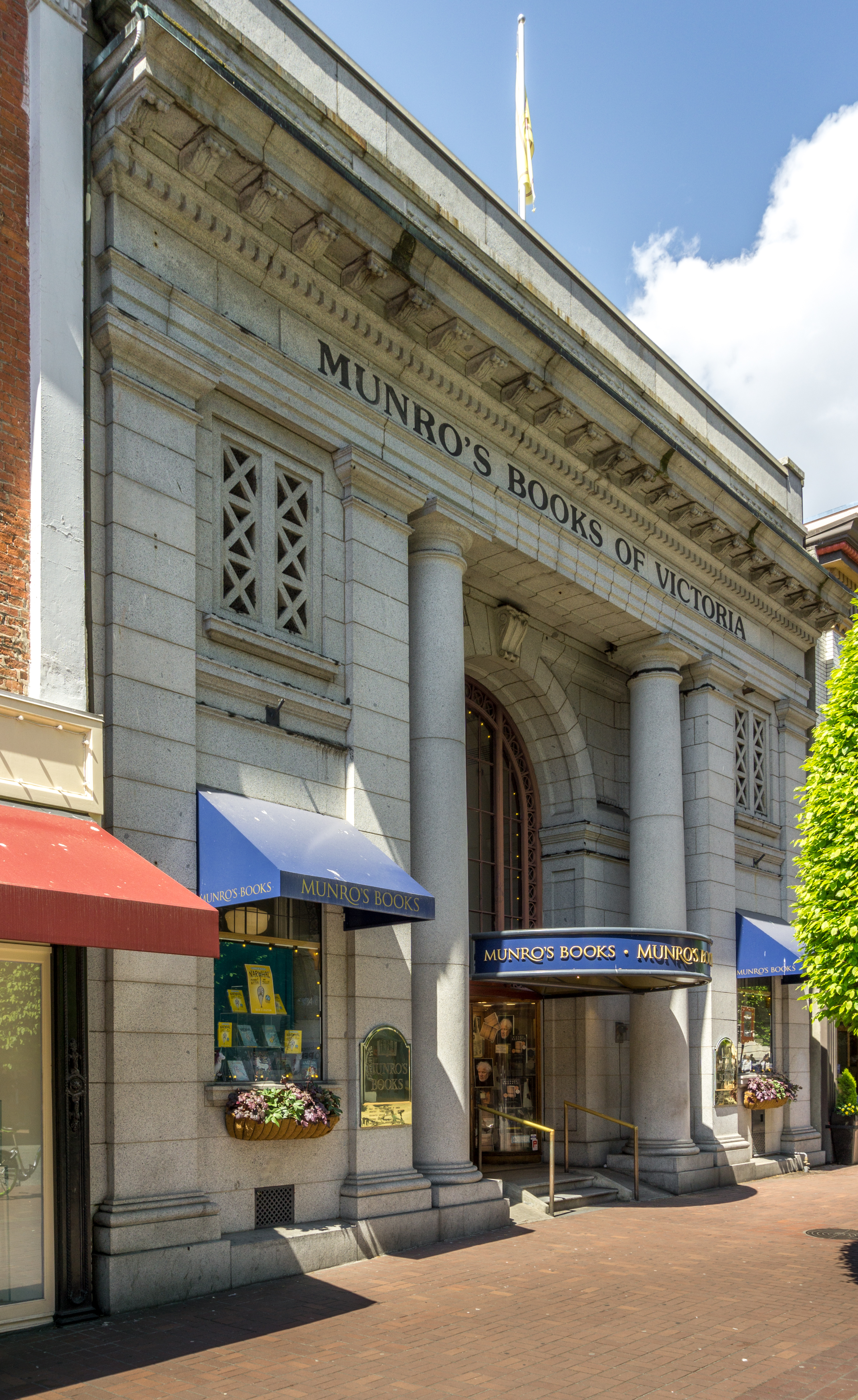
- The building's exterior in 2018
- Interactive map of the Royal Bank Building area

General information
- Location: 1108 Government Street; Victoria, British Columbia; V8W 1Y2
- Coordinates: 48.425278°N 123.368056°W
- Current tenants: Munro's Books
- Groundbreaking: 1909
- Completed: 1910

Design and construction
- Architect: Thomas Hooper

The Royal Bank Building is a historic building in the downtown core of Victoria, British Columbia, Canada. It was designed by architect Thomas Hooper in the Classical Revival style, and was completed in 1910. The building was placed on the Canadian Register of Historic Places in 1975. It currently houses Munro's Books.

== See also ==
- List of historic places in Victoria, British Columbia
