= Napoleon (musical) =

- A Musical
- Official logo
- Music: Timothy Williams
- Lyrics: Andrew Sabiston
- Book: Andrew Sabiston & Timothy Williams

Napoleon is a musical by Timothy Williams and Andrew Sabiston. It has had seven productions in four languages: English, French, Korean and Dutch.

Laurent Bàn as Napoleon 2023 Seoul production

== Productions ==
The musical premiered at the Elgin Theatre in Toronto on 23 March 1994 with Jérôme Pradon as Napoleon and Aline Mowat as Josephine. It was directed by John Wood, and produced by Marlene Smith and Ernie Rubenstein, with orchestrations by David Cullen. It was nominated in 1994 for a Dora Award for Best Musical.

The show's second production opened at the Shaftesbury Theatre in London in September 2000 and ran for five months. It starred Paul Baker and Uwe Kröger as Napoleon, with Anastasia Barzee as Josephine. It was directed by Francesca Zambello and produced by Duncan Weldon, with orchestrations by Jonathan Tunick.

Work on a new version of the musical began in 2009, when director Richard Ouzounian helmed a concert version of the show in Barrie, Ontario with the story narrated by the character Talleyrand, the political mastermind who helped shape Napoleon's career. The concert starred Adam Brazier as Napoleon, Blythe Wilson as Josephine, and Cameron Mitchell Jr. as Talleyrand. This marked the reworking of the musical as a behind-the-scenes political drama with a new book and score.

The new Napoleon debuted at the New York Musical Theatre Festival (NYMF) in July 2015, under the direction of Richard Ouzounian. The new narrative seen through the eyes of Talleyrand, shared modern parallels with the making of leaders of today.

The NYMF debut received glowing notices, praising the show as having "a phenomenal, operatic score" and being "first and foremost an emotional experience that will keep you on the edge of your seat from beginning to end". Deemed a "thrilling drama" that is "riveting, compelling, and deeply moving" its run at NYMF was sold out.

The musical has continued to change in subsequent productions:

Seoul, South Korea - A large-scale production of Napoleon ran at the Charlotte Theater from July 15 to October 22, 2017. It featured a cast of 54 including B.A.P's Daehyun and BTOB's Changsub alongside Korean musical theater stars Lim Tae Kyung, Michael Lee, Han Ji Sang and Summer Jeong. It was directed by Richard Ouzounian, orchestrated by Kim Sungsoo (the artist known for the iconic theme Pink Soldiers from Squid Game (soundtrack)), produced by Show Media Group, and performed in Korean.

Zoetermeer, Netherlands - A small-scale production of the show ran at the open-air Buytenpark Theater from June 29 to July 10, 2022. It was directed by Sebastiaan Smits, who also adapted it into Dutch.

Seoul, South Korea - A large-scale production of the show ran at the Kyung Hee University Grand Peace Palace from May 5–21, 2023. It featured an international cast from France (leads and ensemble) and Korea (dancers and chorus), and was performed in French with Korean subtitles. Laurent Bàn directed, starred as Napoleon, and wrote the French adaptation. It was produced by Park Young Seok. The cast included John Eyzen (Napoleon/Lucien), Chiara di Bari (Josephine), Tatiana Matre (Josephine/Thérèse), Christophe Cerino (Talleyrand), Jerome Collet (Talleyrand/Barras), Romain Fructuoso (Lucien), Emilien Marion (Anton), Pierre Etienne (Anton/Paoli/Barras), Anne-Marine Suire (Clarice), Mathilde Fontan (Clarice/Ensemble), Linda Latiri (Thérèse/Ensemble), Antoine Lelandais (Fouché), Eloi Horry (Garrau), Nollane (Henri), and Elisa Lys, Camille Viel, Lucas Mong-Mane, Gauthier Herbin and Rémi Torrado, as part of the ensemble. Orchestrations were once again by Kim Sungsoo.

== Synopsis ==
The musical is a behind-the-scenes account of the Corsican man who rose from nothing to become Emperor of France. It is told through the eyes of an unreliable narrator, Talleyrand, a Machiavellian career politician who latches onto the young Napoleon and places him on the throne of an empire vaster than Rome. The narrative is Talleyrand's version of events, coloured and skewed by his own opinions as he steps in and out of scenes, offering comments and manipulating the plot. He spins facts to his purpose, has things he wants the audience to know, and others he struggles to keep hidden. Talleyrand thinks he can manage the extraordinary man he’s groomed for greatness. What he isn’t prepared for is the sheer force of Napoleon’s character - and his obsession with Josephine. In the battle to come, Napoleon and Josephine will play out one of the world’s most iconic love stories, while Talleyrand will emerge as the devil incarnate.

=== Act I ===
The curtain rises on a nightmare vision of the Battle of Waterloo. Napoleon’s inability to command shocks his marshals who beg him to give the order to advance but can only watch helplessly as their troops are slaughtered (“Waterloo Opening”). This vision is revealed to be a memory of Talleyrand, first seen as a troubled old man grappling with the question of how Napoleon went from a blazing comet of passion and virtue to the ghost of a once-great man (“What’s Wrong with Him?”). The guilt Talleyrand feels for his role in that transformation consumes him. He takes us back in time to tell his story.

He introduces us to Napoleon at 24: a firebrand of shining ideals. He has returned to his native Corsica to lead an uprising against the government of Pasquale Paoli (“Throw Him Out”). Napoleon has been attending the École Militaire in Paris, witnessed the Revolution unfolding in France and wants to bring its values of equality and justice to his homeland, but his coup attempt fails, and he and his family are banished to France (“Brothers”). Napoleon’s brother, Lucien, struggles to understand why Napoleon would risk his life for a cause. Napoleon explains that in this cruel world, a vendetta against those who keep the masses oppressed is the only path to change (“Wounded”).

Napoleon and Lucien arrive to find Paris in chaos. The king has just been beheaded, law and order are non-existent, and a corrupt government led by the debauched Paul Barras is squandering the Revolution’s promise (“A Place Like Paris”). Witnessing the people’s suffering, Lucien becomes an activist. Napoleon meets Talleyrand, who is miserable in his job as Barras’ senior minister and relentlessly mocked for his physical infirmity – a withered leg which requires him to use a cane. Talleyrand has no patience for the hot-headed Napoleon, but when General Henri, the head of the army, is impressed by the military genius of Napoleon’s plan to defend Toulon against an attack by the British, Talleyrand sees an opportunity to improve his fortunes and attaches himself to Napoleon, claiming him as his protégé (“Providence”).

Napoleon’s brilliant defence of Toulon is a stunning success and Talleyrand introduces him to Parisian society, making him the toast of the town. At a ball hosted by the wealthy Thérèse Tallien, Napoleon meets her friend Rose De Beauharnais and is instantly infatuated (“The Victims’ Ball”). Rose is Barras’ mistress. Seeing her laughing and dancing with Napoleon, Barras violently orders her to leave and belittles Napoleon in front of the crowd. A penniless widow of the Revolution, Rose has been forced into this sordid liaison by her desperate circumstances. She escapes by imagining the life a fortune teller once predicted for her, that she would one day be greater than a queen (“One Day”). Thérèse promises she’ll find a man of means for her, but for now advises Rose to bide her time with Barras. Napoleon calls on Rose and tells her that if she were his he’d give her the world, though he thinks her name doesn’t suit her as well as the one he’d give her – Josephine (“Josephine”). Thérèse, finding her friend with Napoleon again, fears for her safety and encourages her to avoid him. Talleyrand worries that Barras will dismiss Napoleon from the army just as his career is taking off. He counsels his protégé to forget Rose and uses his two henchmen, FOUCHÉ and Garrau, to foment an uprising that Napoleon will be called upon to quell, making his dismissal impossible (“Vendémiaire”).

Lucien and Henri are shocked by the brutal tactics Napoleon employs to stop the uprising – using cannons on the protesters – but Barras is pleased and rewards him with a promotion that will send him away: the command of France’s Alpine border forces. Before Napoleon leaves, he invites Josephine to his humble apartments where they have an impassioned night together and fall in love (“On This First Night”). The next morning, Napoleon shares his battle plans with her. She marvels at his brilliance, believing he'll triumph. Meanwhile, Henri and the army, already on the march, gripe about Napoleon’s plans, calling them the scribblings of a madman (“The Road to Austria”). Napoleon proposes marriage and Josephine accepts. Talleyrand is incensed but they marry in haste.

Napoleon’s ambitious march over the Alps dispirits his troops. He intends to take the anti-revolutionary Austrian army by surprise, but his army, exhausted and demoralized, is convinced they’ll be slaughtered. Napoleon wins them over with a rousing appeal that begins as quiet words of encouragement to a terrified young soldier named ANTON the night before the battle (“The Dream Within”). Against all odds, Napoleon and his army are victorious.

Talleyrand is delighted when Napoleon receives a hero’s welcome from the people on his return to Paris (“The Day Is Won”). Barras is threatened by Napoleon’s popularity and orders Talleyrand to fix it. Talleyrand encourages Napoleon to stage a coup against Barras. (“The Journey Begins”). The plotting spreads across Paris. Josephine convinces Thérèse to fund the coup in payment for some unspecified trouble Thérèse caused Josephine while Napoleon was in the Alps (the details of which we will learn later). Lucien prints pamphlets to whip up the masses, Anton helps distribute them, and Henri agrees to give Napoleon the support of the army but cautions him not to abuse his trust. Henri’s daughter, CLARICE, meets and falls in love with Anton in the thrill and danger of the building plot which leads to the storming of the government council chamber (“The Eighteenth of Brumaire”). Barras’s guards quickly get the upper hand and for a moment all seems lost, but Lucien wins over the guards by swearing that his brother’s cause is just and dramatically vowing to kill him with his own sword if Napoleon ever betrays the principles of the Revolution. The guards arrest Barras, and Napoleon seizes the government, vowing to bring liberty, equality, and fraternity to all. Talleyrand celebrates over champagne with Fouché and Garrau who toast his brilliant political cunning (“A Cutthroat Game”).

Installed in the Tuileries Palace, Josephine berates Napoleon for his crassness and lack of table manners after a mortifying state dinner with the Emperor of Prussia. She sets out to teach him manners. Talleyrand waits impatiently for Napoleon to sign some pressing treaties. He resents the power Josephine holds over Napoleon, and is delighted when an assassination attempt on Napoleon kills her. This is quickly revealed to be his fantasy – Josephine has survived – but the assassination attempt was real, and it prompts Talleyrand to advise Napoleon to enshrine his power in a dynasty and become emperor. This idea is seductively irresistible to Napoleon (“I Am the Revolution”). Lucien is horrified and draws his sword to honour his vow to kill Napoleon but can’t bring himself to do it, and is imprisoned (“The Calm Before the Storm”). Talleyrand convinces Napoleon to exile Lucien, and arranges Napoleon’s coronation (“Timor Mortis”). As the crown is about to be placed on Napoleon’s head, we are privy to his thoughts and get an ominous glimpse of where absolute power will take him (“Sweet Victory Divine”).

=== Act II ===
Four years after the coronation, the empire is prospering. As the power behind the throne, Talleyrand has become obscenely wealthy (“Made by Talleyrand”). Though he’d rather we didn’t find out about his childhood, we do – in a flashback where we learn his parents abandoned him. Repulsed by his deformity and convinced he’d amount to nothing, they inflicted the emotional scars fueling his hunger for success.

Anton has been traveling with the emperor on a state visit as his aide de camp. Henri orders Clarice to forget about Anton, unaware that Clarice and Anton have committed to each other (“A Promise”). Anton gives her a necklace promising to love her as his wife even though Henri will never permit them to marry. Clarice, now Josephine’s lady-in-waiting, says she’ll speak to the empress and persuade her to convince Henri to allow their marriage.

Talleyrand presses Napoleon on the need for an heir. Josephine has been unable to conceive. Talleyrand deliberately lets slip to Napoleon that he suspects her prior miscarriage is to blame. Napoleon knows nothing of this and, in a flashback, we learn with Napoleon what happened right after his marriage (“Plombières”). Thérèse, certain that Napoleon would be killed in his new command, had arranged for Josephine to meet a wealthy aristocrat in the spa town of Plombières. When Josephine rebuffed the idea, Thérèse drugged Josephine’s wine to get her over her inhibitions. The result was an unintended pregnancy that Josephine terminated with a deliberate fall to cause a miscarriage. Talleyrand concludes it may have left her barren. Napoleon is devastated to learn of this secret that Josephine has kept from him all these years (“Secrets Kill”). Thérèse suffers deep regret for having interfered in her friend’s life (“If We Could Start Again”).

Months later, Napoleon has yet to confront Josephine with what he knows, but upon returning home from an imperial tour to a ball in celebration of the empress’ popularity, he can’t bring himself to dance with her (“Our Lady of Victories”). Josephine struggles to understand his change towards her. Talleyrand presses him to tell her about their “experiment” while on tour. Napoleon has successfully sired a bastard. Josephine’s infertility is now confirmed. Talleyrand brutally presses ahead, convincing Napoleon to divorce Josephine (“Saint Napoleon’s Day”) and Josephine retreats from the public eye to protect her broken heart (“Walls of Stone”).

Napoleon’s new marriage to an Austrian princess, arranged by Talleyrand, is loveless, but it produces the heir the empire needs. Barras contacts Napoleon from prison to reveal that Talleyrand was involved in Josephine’s miscarriage, and in a flashback we witness the events at Plombières from a different perspective. Napoleon learns that it was Talleyrand who arranged the collapse of the balcony which left Josephine barren (“Balcony”). Napoleon is enraged and fires Talleyrand.

Russia breaks its treaty with France, and an unhinged Napoleon announces his plans to march on Moscow, a vision that spirals out of control into delusions of world domination (“The Last Crusade”). Talleyrand revenges his firing by leaking Napoleon’s plans to the Russians, sealing the army’s fate to perish in winter (“Russia”). Among the freezing soldiers, Anton and Henri reconcile their differences through their shared love of Clarice, and while Clarice and other wives and mothers cling to the futile hope that their loved ones will return, Anton and Henri perish in the cold (“Waiting and Hoping”). With the army’s defeat, Talleyrand has Napoleon exiled to the Island of Elba. The foulest deed of his life – leaking the plans to Russia – has resulted in his greatest reward: he is now president of the new French government. But he finds he is nothing without Napoleon.

On Elba, Napoleon is devastated to learn of Josephine’s death (“Josephine’s Death”). Thérèse writes that she was with her at the end and that Josephine wanted Napoleon to know she forgave him. Awash with regret and remorse for the harm he caused her, Napoleon struggles to understand how her forgiveness can be possible. He imagines her dying in his arms as she recollects the man he was when they met. She prays that one day he’ll know peace and promises she’ll be waiting for him.

In Paris, Talleyrand learns that Napoleon has been determined to return to power since learning of Josephine’s death. He tries to have him poisoned, but Napoleon escapes from Elba and stages a dramatic return, longing to recapture his past glories. But the fields of Waterloo are all that await and he is unable to command, a ghost of his former self. As his marshals beg him to give the order to advance, they can only watch helplessly as their troops are slaughtered (“Waterloo”).

Talleyrand realizes that in turning Napoleon away from those he loved, he failed to see “the one great truth” – that life is relationships: without them we are broken (“Finale”). Talleyrand mourns the man Napoleon was, the man he destroyed (“Dream Within Reprise”).

== Authors ==
Timothy Williams is a multi-award-winning composer and orchestrator for theatre, film, and video games. Film highlights include Wild Horses, written and directed by Robert Duvall, Walking With the Enemy, I.T., directed by John Moore and starring Pierce Brosnan, The Mulberry Tree, Red Sky, Debug, and Beyond All Boundaries. He has written additional music for and/or orchestrated/conducted over 60 films including Get Out, Guardians of the Galaxy, Guardians of the Galaxy Vol. 2, Hidden Figures, It, Sucker Punch, Watchmen, The Day the Earth Stood Still, and 300. For Disney and Universal, his live theatrical works include adaptations and orchestrations of Aladdin (book by Chad Beguelin), Wicked (for Tokyo), Tangled - The Musical and other shows directed by Gordon Greenberg, Joe Calarco and Eric Schaeffer. He recently arranged the songs for up and coming artist Zella Day. He has been nominated for a Dora Award and has won three Thea awards.

Andrew Sabiston is a writer, series developer, executive story editor and performer in the children's/youth television market with over 1200 episodes to his credit. Many of the programs in which he has been involved are multiple award-winners airing globally and include: Little Bear; Max & Ruby; Mike the Knight; Arthur; Justin Time; Trucktown; Bo On the Go; My Big Big Friend; The Moblees; Little Charmers; The Adventures of Napkin Man; Donkey Kong Country, The Neverending Story; Droids, Super Mario Brothers; Harry and His Bucket Full of Dinosaurs; Babar and Badou, and The Travels of the Young Marco Polo. He is a 2022 and 2020 Writers Guild of Canada Award nominee, executive story editor and writer for the 2019 International Emmy Award nominated series Super Wings, a 2015 Canadian Screen Award Nominee for Best Writing, and has had multiple scripts nominated for Best Series in various categories in the Youth Media Alliance Awards of Excellence.

== Recordings ==
1993 - The Act One finale "Sweet Victory Divine" was covered by Stig Rossen on his album The Impossible Dream as well as on the live album Live in Concert (med Sønderjyllands Symfoniorkester) (1994)

1994 - The original cast recording of Napoleon was released by EMI Broadway Angel and featured 18 tracks from the show performed by the original Canadian cast from the Toronto production. It was produced by David Krystal.

1994 - A pop single version of ‘On That First Night - Love Theme From Napoleon’ recorded by Dan Hill and Rique Franks, and produced by John Sheard was released to radio. It reached #16 on the Canadian Billboard charts

2000 - Ahead of the London production opening, First Night Records recorded and released five tracks from the show featuring the original London cast and orchestra. It included a new song ("Only In Fantasy") sung by Anastasia Barzee.

2001 - German musical theater star Uwe Kröger included the Act One finale "Sweet Victory Divine" on his live concert CD In Love With Musical Again.

2008 - Adam Brazier performed "Sweet Victory Divine" on Field of Stars (Volume 2), Songs of the Canadian Musical Theatre, produced by Jim Betts.

2009 - To mark the 15th anniversary of the musical’s stage debut, the 1994 cast album was remastered and a version featuring 15 of the original tracks was released by Stage Door Records.

2023 - Chiara di Bari released "La Première Fois", the French adaptation of the Napoleon and Josephine duet "On That First Night" on her album, Delen. The adaptation was by Laurent Bàn, who also sung the role of Napoleon on the track.

Highlights were aired on CBC and BBC radio programs hosted by Richard Ouzounian in Canada and Elaine Paige in England.
