= Blythe Wilson =

Canadian actress

Blythe Wilson is a Canadian actress who has been part of the Stratford Festival company since 1995, playing lead roles as Nancy in Oliver! in 2006 and Laurey in Oklahoma! in 2007.

She has also acted at the Shaw Festival as well as the Chicago Shakespeare Theater and a number of other festivals and theatres in Canada and the United States. She was born in Vancouver, British Columbia, she attended the Vancouver Playhouse Theatre School.

From October 3, 2008 to January 11, 2009 she performed the role of Baroness Schraeder in Andrew Lloyd Webber's Canadian revival of The Sound of Music, on stage at the Princess of Wales Theatre in Toronto, Ontario. She also performed in the musical Napoleon. Wilson joined the U.S tour of Mary Poppins in Los Angeles in January 2010 performing the role of Mrs. Banks. In November 2011 she joined the Broadway company of Mary Poppins, again as Mrs. Banks, marking her Broadway debut.

Wilson is married to Canadian actor Mark Harapiak, son of Harry Harapiak.
