= Munro's Books =

Independent book shop in Victoria, British Columbia, Canada

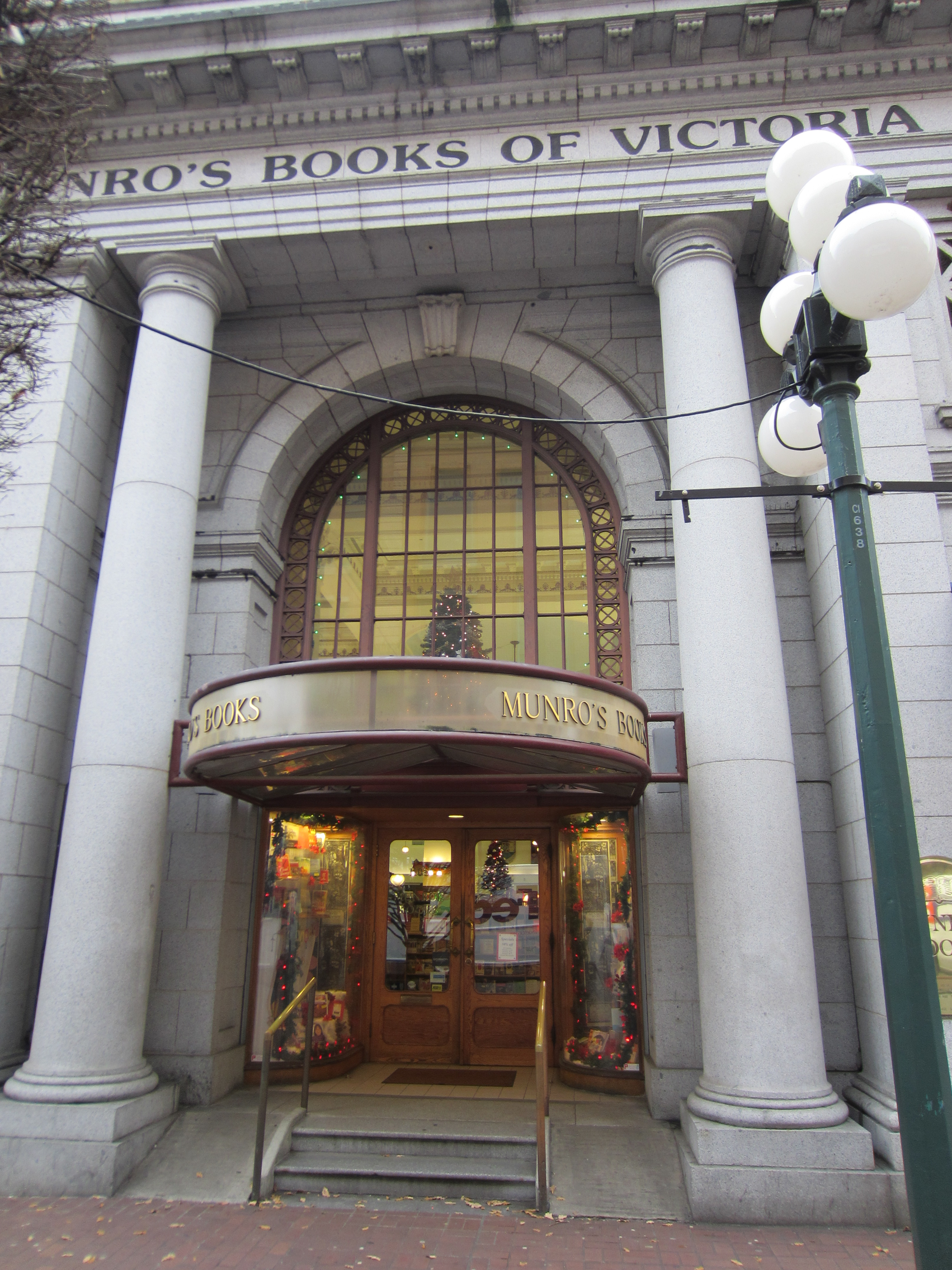
- Munro's Books entrance, 2012
- Company type: Private
- Industry: Books
- Founded: Victoria, British Columbia (1963)
- Founder: James Munro; Alice Munro
- Headquarters: 1108 Government Street; Victoria, British Columbia; V8W 1Y2 48.425278°N 123.368056°W
- Key people: Jim Munro and Alice Munro (co-founders)
- Number of employees: 30
- Website: www.munrobooks.com

Munro's Books is a large independent bookstore in Victoria, British Columbia, Canada, located in a landmark heritage building on Government Street. It was founded in 1963 by Jim Munro and his then-wife Alice. Since Jim's retirement in 2014, the store has had no connection to the Munro family. The store celebrated its 50th anniversary in September 2013.

Since 1984, the store has been located in downtown Victoria in the neo-classical Royal Bank Building with a 7.3-metre (24 ft) coffered ceiling, designed in 1909 for the Royal Bank of Canada by architect Thomas Hooper. Munro's Books has been described by journalist Allan Fotheringham as "the most magnificent bookstore in Canada, possibly in North America."

The store was founded in 1963 by Jim Munro and his first wife, Alice Munro, the 2013 Nobel Prize-winning short-story writer. At the start, its stock was mostly paperbacks. According to Jim Munro, Alice Munro began to write after reading some of the bookstore's stock and deciding angrily that "I can write better books than this," however, Alice had her first story published 13 years before the bookstore opened, in 1950. Although Alice Munro did not have any relation to the bookstore for decades, the store still received fan and press calls asking for her.

Textile artist Carole Sabiston, Jim Munro's second wife, created the tapestries that decorate the bookstore.

The store management issued a statement in support of Alice and Jim Munro's daughter Andrea Skinner shortly after the publication of the story in major North American newspapers that Alice Munro's second husband had abused Munro's daughter.

== See also ==
- Russell Books
