= Interlude (video game) =

Visual novel (video game) and anime

- Dreamcast cover art

インタールード (Intārūdo)
- Video game
- Developer: Longshot
- Publisher: Dreamcast, PlayStation 2: JP: Interchannel; Windows: JP: Shall Luck Plus
- Genre: Visual novel
- Platform: Dreamcast, PlayStation, Microsoft Windows
- Released: Dreamcast: JP: 13 March 2003; PlayStation 2: JP: 9 October 2003; Windows: JP: 28 May 2004
- Original video animation
- Directed by: Tatsuya Nagamine (Note: Episode 2 as series director (シリーズ監督)); Masahiro Hosoda (2)
- Produced by: Hiroaki Shibata
- Written by: Akemi Omode
- Music by: Koichiro Kameyama
- Studio: Toei Animation
- Licensed by: NA: Toei Animation, Inc.
- Released: 25 March 2004 – 27 August 2004
- Episodes: 3

Interlude (インタールード, Intārūdo) is an anime and visual novel by Longshot told in parallel novel style that follows the events around three women. Interlude was originally released for the Sega Dreamcast on March 13, 2003, a rare occurrence for visual novels, as most are released for Windows first. PlayStation 2 and Windows ports were later also released. The PS2 version received a 'The Best' budget price re-release on March 1, 2007.

== Characters ==
The player assumes the role of a (usually) anonymous protagonist in the series. Sometimes he takes the name Naoya Aizawa, such as in the animated adaption.

The three main women are:

- Aya Watsuji (和辻 綾, Watsuji Aya), a girl who is going insane. Aya is a skilled archer and lives alone in a town empty of people. Aya thinks that if she acts that if everything is normal, then everyone would return.
- Izumi Marufuji (丸藤 泉美, Marufuji Izumi) an office lady.
- Maiko "Tama" Tamaki (玉城 麻衣子, Tamaki Maiko), a childhood friend of the protagonist actuated by the player in the game.

== Story of the novel ==
Aya is a girl, whose life saw an abrupt change. After her mother died in a traffic accident, she came back as if nothing happened. As Aya questions her memories, people disappear from the town she lives in. She decides to keep her routine intact, since she is not willing to come to terms with that. The scene cuts and we see an unnamed protagonist arrive at the train station and quarrel with a girl called Tamaki over being late. She, in turn, blames her younger brother Gamo, with whom she played games all night long. As the quarrel continues in the train, Tamaki gets stuck in big breasts of a woman, who is well-known among boys at the main character's school. With the confusion settled at another station, the main character finds himself in an awkward position as everyone disappears. Only one person is seen, a girl in a green dress, previously revealed to be Aya, who is looking at an English wordbook in her hand. The two look in each other's eyes and then everything returns to normal. From then on, the story branches into roughly three routes.

=== Route of Tamaki ===
The main character mostly forgets about Aya and spends time with his childish childhood friend Tamaki, as well as her girly friend Chika Kimura and Kimura's self-reserved friend Haruka Fujinobe. While Fujinobe is friendly to Kimura, she has little patience for Tamaki.

=== Route of Marufuji ===
Marufuji, the aforementioned woman with big breasts, is an office lady working at City Hall, who is often sexually harassed by men. As the main character begins to ignore Tamaki and spends much time with Marufuji and her two co-workers Takase and Minegishi, he ends learning about a parallel-world city, where the sun never rises and which dangerous monsters inhabit along with suspicious humans in protective suits coming to visit it, and that something is not right about Marufuji's workplace. The two are assisted by a middle-aged man Sugiura, who ends up being killed in the 'main world', presumably by a monster that slipped in. After much struggle, Ikuo Fuyuki, Marufuji's boss, reveals that City Hall is a cover for Pandora Project, which purpose is to prevent the moon city from invading the 'main world'. Marufuji and the main character get to see how Aya fights a massive ghost before leaving into some other world. The last scene has Marufuji and the main character kiss at the beach.

=== Route of Aya ===
The main character investigates Aya's uniform, but to no avail. He would believe that Aya was a mirage, if not for seeing a shadow run without a body along the city at evening. His suspicion is drawn by an improperly dressed school councillor. Not only she is not the person he remembers her to be, which contradicts Tamaki's memories, he saw her move her hand through a girls body, pull out a worm-like creature and smash it, causing the girl, who previously spoke unintelligibly, to start saying understandable words. When he visits her for the first time, he loses consciousness and after coming back to his senses the woman shouts that he leave. Eventually she reveals the secret truth: the world ended due to laws of physics and causality no longer being applicable and energy gaining a will of its own. The place the main character inhabits was designed to separate humans from the unstable world. The peculiar events happening to the main character are explained by the border between the worlds waning and energy slipping in. She warns against Aya, who supposedly would destroy the world the second time. She has no clue what Aya is, but makes a guess that it is energy that took human form. From councilor's room the main character slips through to the moon city. After his own shadow escaping, the main character is deluded by some monster into seeing Aya in his school's uniform smile at him. The illusion is shattered by actual Aya shooting the monster from a bow. She says she also searched for the main character and the two take a train, which works despite no people being around, presumably for Aya's sake alone. As the eternal night changes into eternal day, the two arrive at Aya's town. The main character notices that Aya has no shadow either; the main character already saw Aya's shadow in his own city standing still without Aya next to it. Aya says that she wants to find a 'door'. The two return to the moon city, where Aya makes sure to avoid shadows. She explains that one has to be careful, as nothing is certain in that place and supposedly innocuous things may not be that. Aya says that she saw two not very friendly humans, that lived by eating monsters, and that they said 'the prince' may know about the 'door'. Thinking she will find 'the prince' at the top of a garbage heap, Aya climbs all the way up only for her to find a toy. She has no time for disappointment, as a massive dog-like haze approaches her. The two try to escape, but the spirit dog attacks Aya. The main character tries to attack it on his own, but then the two mentioned hunters catch Aya and kidnap her, while the spirit dog follows them. The main character finds them in the underground and escapes with Aya, eventually finding a portal to his world. Except he sees nor Aya nor anyone else. He comes to councillor's room and she calls him on the phone and tells him to go to the City Hall. After a checkup from people in protective suits, he goes to Ikuo Fuyuki, leader of the Pandora Project, who reveals that Pandora Project was designed to isolate the world within a dream of the girl named Saegusa Mutsuki, which the main character assumes to be the moon city. While he has no idea what Aya is, his conjecture is that she was made by the moon city. They failed to contact her. He also says that Aya's presence inadvertently causes this world to collapse the same way the real world collapsed, which means that in a few hours the more fragile 'main world' would be consumed by the moon city. As Aya herself seeks to leave, the main character approaches Aya and has a date with her. Two options then appear: to let her go or to go along with her. The first option causes everyone to come back and the main character still lives in his world after that. The post-credits scene shows that the main character still feels the moon city's presence. The second option has Aya reveal that her entire life was a lie and that she is a 'shadow' for someone who is both willing to leave and willing to stay. The two are now together. Aya is amused how their existence could be erased had Mutsuki simply opened her eyes. In the post-credits scene Marufuji in a protective suit cries that she won't see people close to her again as Fuyuki plans to launch a 'reconstruction'.

=== Mutsuki route ===
Route of Mutsuki is largely the same as Aya's, except for the main character meeting up with Mutsuki at various occasions. At one point Mutsuki shows the main character her memories of how she was put within the device she was in, where it is made clear that it works thanks to memories of other people given to Mutsuki. After failing to save Aya from Pig and General, the main character, who already established cordial relations with Mutsuki, is summoned by her to Pandora Project office. He sees Fuyuki and some woman talk about reconstruction, how on each reconstruction memories are formed anew, how Aya could be an expression of Mutsuki's desire to wake up and how Mutsuki could be all alone in the real world. The main character sees Mutsuki sleeping in a grotesque sarcophagus and is about to leave, but then he realises that not only all events happened within Mutsuki's dream, but Mutsuki herself is a god-like figure because of that. That Aya was not the main character of the story, but merely a distraction. He rushes back to Mutsuki and sees her looking back at him. In the post-credits scene the main character, who continues living in his world, meets Mutsuki and walks along with her along the moon city. He now has memories of living with Mutsuki, which is something he didn't remember before. While Mutsuki pats a scary ghost dog, whom she calls Hedgehog, the main character is glad that Mutsuki won't be alone anymore.

== Adaptations ==
A three-episode OVA directed by Tatsuya Nagamine was produced and licensed by Toei Animation. It premiered in 2004 on SkyPerfecTV and was released on DVD in 2005. It was distributed in English speaking countries by Geneon Entertainment, with a dub produced by Kaleidoscope Entertainment. A Japanese-audio English-subtitle version was made available for streaming free on Crunchyroll in April 2011. Its story is very different from that of the game.

=== OVA cast ===
Interlude (OVA) cast
Role	Japanese	English
Role	Japanese	Kaleidoscope Entertainment
Naoya Aizawa (Protagonist)	Masakazu Morita	Marlowe Gardiner-Heslin
Maiko "Tama" Tamaki	Yukari Tamura	Stephanie Anne Mills
Mutsuki Saegusa	Ikue Ōtani	Bryn McAuley
Aya Watsuji	Houko Kuwashima	Terri Hawkes
Ikuo Fuyuki	Hozumi Gōda	Richard Clarkin
Izumi Marufuji	Mami Kingetsu	Stephanie Martin
Yuki Takase	Wakana Yamazaki	Deborah Drakeford
Kaoruko Minegishi	Machiko Toyoshima	Katie Griffin
Miyako Saegusa	Misa Watanabe	Julie Lemieux
Sugiura	Keiichi Sonobe	Rod Wilson
Chika "Kim" Kimura	Kumiko Nishihara	Julie Lemieux
Haruka "Haru" Fujinobe	Yumi Tōma	Caitriona Murphy
The General	Hisao Egawa	Drew Coombs
The Pig	Takashi Nagasako	Rod Wilson

==== Episodes ====
Episode 1

High school student Naoya Aizawa has recurring visions of himself and his long time friend Tama in the aftermath of a catastrophic event where Tama is dying. There are rumors of shadow creatures following and threatening people, and one evening Naoya, Tama and her schoolfriends Kim and Haru, see a shadowy figure carrying a bow and give chase. Tama literally runs into Izumi Marufuji and her two friends, Kaoruko Minegishi and Yuki Takase who all work at City Hall and are also chasing the girl. The group are confronted by a zombie-like woman and chase her, only to find themselves in a deserted city with other zombies menacing them. They are saved by Sugiura who claims to be a monster hunter who shoots the zombies. A young girl, Mutsuki, orders "Hedgehog... reBoot.." and dog-like flaming beast attacks Sugiura. Naoya awakes, realizing it was a dream. He visits City Hall seeking Marufuji, but she and her team have no recollection of the events with the zombies although she does have a photo of the "Pandora project". Naoya again finds himself in the deserted city where a young woman with long black hair with a bow and arrow saves him from an attack by Hedgehog.

Episode 2

Naoya finds himself in a deserted Moon City and sees multiple darks shadowy creatures called fairies. He is attacked by the General and Buta (The Pig) but is rescued by the young woman with a bow whom he recalls seeing on a train platform in his dreams. She takes Naoya to her home and explains that until the day they saw each other on a railway platform, she has seen no-one in her world. She reveals her name is Aya Watsuji and she carries on with her life as normal, catching the train to school each day to study alone. Naoya encourages her to attend an amusement park, and plans to return with her to his world. They return to Moon City where the encounter shadowy fairy creatures and Marufuji's City Hall team and Sugiura. General and Buta again attack them, badly wounding Sugiura who defends them but seems unconcerned by his injuries. They head for City Hall to research Pandora and Naoya receives a phone call warning him not to remember. Again they encounter Mutsuki who sends Hedghog after them.

Episode 3

Aya destroys Hedgehog and the group enter City Hall where Ikuo Fuyuki explains that Naoya is one of only 12 survivors of an apocalyptic event, and the world he inhabits is created by the mind of Mutsuki who has been kept in stasis. Whenever reality begins to tear the fabric of the illusion, the shadowy fairies appear. He warns that Aya can destroy their world. Aya fires an arrow at Fuyuki but Naoya steps in front and is shot instead. He awakes to find himself back in the past, living at his brother Ikuo Fuyuki and his wife Miyako's house with his sister Mitsuki and her dog, Hedgehog. Naoya begins to realize that he wanted the world to exist for his childhood friend Tama who had died, but understands that it was false reality and that he wants to be with Aya. Aya fires an arrow which destroys Hedgehog and shatters the illusion. Naoya apologizes to Mutsuki and returns to the real world, waking up in the ruins of the facility built by Fuyuki. He heads off into the wasteland, following footsteps in the sand.
