= Russell Books =

Independent bookstore in Victoria, British Columbia

Coordinates: 48.424367°N 123.364022°W

- Type: Private
- Industry: Books
- Founded: Montreal, Quebec (1962)
- Headquarters: 747 Fort Street; Victoria, British Columbia; V8W 3E9
- Key people: Reg Russell (founder); Diana DePol; Ronald DePol; Andrea Minter (manager); Jordan Minter (manager); Chad DePol
- Number of employees: 60
- Website: Official website

Russell Books is an independent bookstore in Victoria, British Columbia, Canada. A family-owned business still owned and operated by the children and grandchildren of its founder, it has been labelled as the largest used bookstore in Canada.

== History ==
Russell Books was founded in 1962 by Reg Russell in Montreal. Originally launched as The Book Nook, the store became Russell Books in 1983.

In 1991, Russell helped open a Victoria branch with his daughter, Diana, and her husband, Ron DePol. The store is currently managed by Reg Russell's granddaughter, Andrea Minter, and her husband, Jordan Minter.

The Montreal store remained in operation until 1999, when its location was expropriated for the expansion of the Palais des congrès de Montréal; Reg Russell then launched the smaller Diamond Books store in another location, and operated it until selling it upon his retirement in 2004. Upon his retirement, Russell's antiquarian book collection was shipped to his daughter's Victoria store, while most of the store's regular stock remained with its new owners. A scene in the 1999 film The Bone Collector was shot in the Montreal store before its closure.

In 1996, Russell Books became one of the first independent bookstores in the world to place its inventory on AbeBooks.

In 2005, Diana's son Brandon and his wife Charlene helped start up another store, Books on View, as a division of Russell Books, in the Sayward Building at the corner of View and Douglas Streets.

The Victoria store expanded its space several times, taking over the upstairs floor of an adjoining building in 2008 and taking over the neighbouring Fort Café in 2013. In 2019, the store moved across the street to a new, larger location with 10,000 square feet on the main floor and 8,000 square feet (743.22 m²) below. This move required employees to manually move over half a million books. Because of the main store's expanded space, Books on View was concurrently shut down.

Prior to the move, Russell Books claimed to be the largest independent used bookseller in Canada, with their locations containing over 1 million volumes. They hoped the new location would allow them to increase their inventory to 1.25 million volumes.

== Guinness World Records ==
On November 14, 2019, as an event promoting their new location, the bookstore set a new world record for the number of stacked Guinness World Records books.

== Rankings ==
It has been rated as one of the best bookstores in Victoria, British Columbia, in the LSE Review of Books, published by the London School of Economics.

== See also ==
- Munro's Books
