= Andrew Sabiston =

Canadian actor

- Born: 1964 or 1965 (age 61–62); Victoria, British Columbia, Canada
- Occupations: Actor; story editor; writer
- Years active: 1981–present
- Spouse: Stephanie Martin (m. 1996)
- Children: 1
- Mother: Carole Sabiston
- Website: andrewsabiston.com

Andrew Sabiston (born 1964 or 1965) is a Canadian actor, story editor, writer, and multi-award nominated Canadian children's television series developer, with over 1,100 episodes to his credit.

== Early life ==
Sabiston was born in 1964 or 1965 in Victoria, British Columbia, to Carole (née Slater), a textile artist originally from England and Brian Sabiston, a research immunologist who had roots in Orphir. His stepsister is Andrea Robin Skinner.

== Early career ==
An early start as a stage actor in his childhood with the Belfry Theatre, Bastion Theatre and Phoenix Theatre in his hometown, led to being cast in Paul Almond's 1983 film Ups and Downs alongside classmate Leslie Hope which was filmed at their high school, St. Michaels University School. He soon landed a starring role on the multiple award-winning Disney Channel/CBC television series The Edison Twins which ran for six seasons, was widely syndicated and earned him a Young Artist Award nomination for Best Young Actor in a Cable Family Series. Sabiston's first writing credit (Story Idea by) was for the Home Sweet Home episode of The Edison Twins, which aired in 1984.

Other film and television roles included starring in Paul Saltzman's coming-of-age film When We First Met opposite Amy Linker in 1984, guest starring on MacGyver in 1987 (Hell Week; Season 3, Episode 9) alongside John Cameron Mitchell and appearing as a juror in the 1994 thriller Trial by Jury starring Gabriel Byrne, Armand Assante, and Joanne Whalley.

== Children's television series ==
=== Developer ===
Many of the children's television series in which Sabiston has been involved are multiple award-nominees and/or winners airing internationally. As of 2019, series that he has created, developed or co-developed include: The Remarkable Mr. King (based on the Mr. King book series by author-illustrator Geneviève Côté, Kiki & Nuna, Super Wings (Seasons 3, 4 and 5), Ranger Rob, and The Moblees.

=== Writer ===
Series with a writing credit include all of the above and Agent Binky: Pets of the Universe, Hatchimals, The Cat in the Hat Knows a Lot About That!, Max & Ruby, The Adventures of Napkin Man, Dot., Trucktown, Justin Time, You & Me by Jason Hopley on CBC, The Travels of the Young Marco Polo, My Big Big Friend, Franklin and Friends, Monster Math Squad, Animal Mechanicals, Pirates: Adventures in Art, Bo on the Go!, Strawberry Shortcake's Seaberry Beach Party, Turbo Dogs, and Lunar Jim.

=== Voice acting ===
Series that Sabiston has voiced leading characters and guest roles on include: Corn & Peg, Little Bear (as Cat), Henry's World (as Cupid), Mike the Knight, Arthur, Bo on the Go!, Little Charmers (as Seven and Mr. Charming), Donkey Kong Country (as Diddy Kong), Go Away, Unicorn!, BeyWheelz, Polka Dot Shorts, The Amazing Spiez, Totally Spies!, Super Why! (as the Eraser), Artopia, Toot & Puddle, Roboroach, Knights of the Zodiac, Rescue Heroes, Air Master, Tales From the Cryptkeeper, The Future Is Wild, What It's Like Being Alone, Care Bears Movie: Journey to Joke-a-Lot, Bill & Ted's Excellent Adventures, The Neverending Story, Star Wars: Droids, Super Mario World (as Yoshi), Stickin' Around, Harry and His Bucket Full of Dinosaurs, Babar and the Adventures of Badou, and Wish Kid.

== Theatre ==
For the theatre, Sabiston is the lyricist and co-book writer with composer Timothy Williams for the musical Napoleon which was first produced in 1994 at The Elgin Theatre in Toronto under the direction of John Wood. It was subsequently produced in 2000 at the Shaftesbury Theatre in London under the direction of Francesca Zambello. In 2009, a new version was first presented in concert at Talk Is Free Theatre in Barrie, Ontario, under the direction of Richard Ouzounian. This marked the beginning of a reimagining of the musical as an intimate, behind-the-scenes political drama with a cast half the size of the original productions and a new book and musical numbers. The new Napoleon debuted at the New York Musical Theatre Festival in July 2015.

In July 2017, a new production opened at the Charlotte Theatre in Seoul for a limited three-month run. It featured a cast of 54 including K-pop artists B.A.P's Daehyun and BtoB's Changsub alongside musical actors such as Im Tae-kyung, Michael K. Lee, and Han Ji-sang. It was directed by Richard Ouzounian and presented in Korean.

== Personal life ==
Sabiston has been married to Stephanie Martin since 1996. They have one child.

== Awards and nominations ==
Year	Award	Category	Title	Contribution	Result	Source
2020	International Emmy Award	Best Animated Preschool Series	Super Wings Season 3	Co-Developed & ESE'd w/ Hugh Duffy	Nominated	
2020	Writers Guild of Canada Award	Best Preschool Animation Writing	The Remarkable Mr. King - Mr. King's Quiet Time; Ep.102B	Writer	Nominated	
2019	Canadian Screen Award	Best Pre-school Program or Series	Ranger Rob	Co-Developed & ESE'd w/ Carolyn Hay	Nominated	
2019	Parents' Choice Award	TV & Streaming	The Moblees Get Moving	Co-Developed & ESE'd w/ Jed MacKay	Won	
2018	Juno Award	Children's Album of the Year	The Moblees - Happy Tippy Tap	Lyrics	Nominated	
2017	Rockie Award	Best Children's Fiction	Ranger Rob	Co-Developed & ESE'd w/ Carolyn Hay	Nominated	
2017	Youth Media Alliance Award of Excellence	Best Program, Animation, Ages 3–5	Ranger Rob	Co-Developed & ESE'd w/ Carolyn Hay	Nominated	
2016	Shaw Rocket Prize	Preschool, Ages 0–5	The Moblees	Co-Developed & ESE'd w/ Jed MacKay	Nominated	
2015	Canadian Screen Award	Best Writing, Animation	Justin Time - The Tower of Justin; Ep.201	Writer	Nominated	
2015	Youth Media Alliance Award of Excellence	Best TV Program, Ages 3–5; Episode	The Adventures of Napkin Man - Try Share-A-Tops; Ep.115	Writer	Won	
2015	Youth Media Alliance Award of Excellence	Best TV Program, Animation, Ages 3–5; Episode	Trucktown - Super Hero Trucks; Ep.110	Writer	Nominated	
2015	Youth Media Alliance Award of Excellence	Best Program, Ages 3–5	The Moblees Get Moving	Co-Developed & ESE'd w/ Jed MacKay	Nominated	
2015	International Emmy Award	Preschool Program	Mike The Knight	Voice of Squirt	Won	
1994	Dora Mavor Moore Award	Outstanding New Play or Musical	Napoleon	Book with Timothy Williams, music by Tim Williams, Lyrics by Andrew Sabiston	Nominated	
1989	Young Artist Award	Best Young Actor in a Cable Family Series	The Edison Twins - 1982	Role of Tom Edison	Nominated	

== See also ==
- List of Canadian voice actors
- List of musicals
- List of dragons in film and television
