= Ōkubo Nagayasu =

Japanese samurai bureaucrat and daimyō

Ōkubo Nagayasu (大久保 長安; 1545 – June 13, 1613) was a Japanese samurai bureaucrat and daimyō of the Edo period.

He was in charge of silver mines at Sagami after 1601, at Sado after 1603 and at Izu after 1606. He expanded production at each mine.

After his death, evidence of misconduct was found. His fief was confiscated and his sons were ordered to commit suicide.
