= Carole Sabiston =

English-born Canadian textile artist (1939–2026)

Carole Sabiston OBC RCA
- Born: Carole Slater; October 1, 1939; London, England
- Died: January 26, 2026 (aged 86); Victoria, British Columbia, Canada
- Occupation: Textile artist
- Family: Andrew Sabiston (son)

Carole Sabiston OBC RCA (née Slater; October 1, 1939 – January 26, 2026) was an English-born Canadian textile artist.

== Career ==
Sabiston created large-scale installations for public institutions, theatre design, public ceremonies, and exhibitions. She received commissions from the lieutenant governor of British Columbia, the University of Victoria, the Pacific Forestry Centre, the McPherson Theatre, and mystery writer P.D. James.

One of her later major shows was a retrospective curated by Patricia Bovey and titled Everything Below All of the Above at the Art Gallery of Greater Victoria in 2014.

== Personal life and death ==
Born in London to George and Doris Slater, Sabiston moved to Canada with her parents in 1948. In 1961, she married Brian Sabiston and she studied art education at the University of British Columbia and the University of Victoria.

In 1976, Sabiston married Jim Munro, owner of the Munro's Books bookstore in Victoria, B.C. Her tapestries representing the four seasons decorate architecture niches and contribute to the decor that made Munro's make a list of 'Sixteen Bookstores to See Before You Die'.

Sabiston was friends with Pulitzer Prize winning author, Carol Shields, who moved down the street from Sabiston in 2000 until Shields died in 2003. As a tribute to her friend, Sabiston created a work of art that stitched together pieces of Shields' clothing.

Sabiston's son is children's television series producer Andrew Sabiston.

Carole Sabiston died on January 26, 2026, at the age of 86.

== Honours ==
In 1987, Sabiston won the Saidye Bronfman Award, as well as being named to the Royal Canadian Academy of Arts.

In 1992, Sabiston was named to the Order of British Columbia. and in 1993 was awarded the Queen's Diamond Jubilee Medal and the 125th Canada Medal.

In 1995, Sabiston received an honorary doctorate of fine arts from the University of Victoria.
