= Squid Game (soundtrack) =

2021 soundtrack album by Jung Jae-il

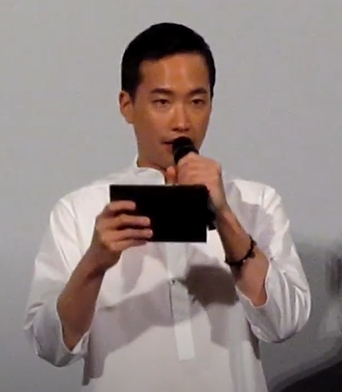
Jung Jae-il composed the score for the series.

Squid Game (Original Soundtrack to the Netflix Series) is the soundtrack to the Korean survival drama television series of the same name. The score for the series is composed by Jung Jae-il in his maiden television debut. While Jae-il composed most of the cues, he later collaborated with Park Min-ju and Kim Sung-soo (under the stage name "23") for additional music. The album for the score of the first season was released on September 17, 2021, by Genie Music and Stone Music Entertainment.

== Development ==
=== Season 1 score ===
Squid Game

Soundtrack album by Jung Jae-il
- Released: September 17, 2021
- Genre: Soundtrack
- Length: 71:35
- Languages: Korean; English
- Labels: Genie Music; Stone Music Entertainment

Jung Jae-il chronology
Parasite (2019)	Squid Game (2021)	Broker (2022)

Jung Jae-il was first approached by the director following his critical acclaim to the score he composed for Parasite (2019). It marked his maiden television debut. Compared to feature film composition, the score for Squid Game demanded on being "bigger, longer and slightly different". Jae-il took a long time to compose the series, and to prevent the score from becoming boring, he asked the help of two other composers: Park Min-ju and Kim Sung-soo (under the stage name "23") for additional music. The original score for the 9-episode series consisted a variety of musical styles and the instrumentation ranges from guitar and percussions to have a contemporary western music, with synth-rock, jazz and orchestral music, being juxtaposed with each mood of the scene. Speaking to Gold Derby, Jae-il had said "the music should not be in the foreground of the scene, but at the same time, music can show something completely different to the scene".

Apart from the original score, two classical music pieces were used throughout the score, depicting as the routine part of the players: the third movement of Joseph Haydn's "Trumpet Concerto" is used to wake the players, while Johann Strauss II's "The Blue Danube" is used to indicate the start of a new game. Ludwig van Beethoven's "Fifth Symphony" is also used as the background score in the VIP lounge, and Tchaikovsky's "Serenade for Strings" also play in the series. A cover version of "Fly Me to the Moon", (Note: Hwang revealed that the music figures used for the project were the ones in the gas station where he wrote the script, and that they were playing "Fly Me to the Moon", and this is why he used the music for the show.) arranged by Jae-il and sung by Korean artist Joo Won Shin, was used over the "Red Light, Green Light" game of the first episode. According to Joo, the showrunner Hwang Dong-hyuk wanted a contrast between the brutal killing of the players in the game and the "romantic and beautiful lyrics and melody" of the song, such that the scene "embodies the increasingly polarized capitalist society that we live in today in a very compressed and cynical way". Jae-il intended that the director already chose the classical pieces during the scripting process as he felt that "the music should be something that feels familiar to everyone".

For the song "Way Back Then" that accompanies children playing Squid Game, Jung wanted to use instruments that he practiced in elementary school, such as recorders and castanets. The rhythm of the song is based on a 3-3-7 clapping rhythm that is commonly used in South Korea to cheer someone on. The recorder, played by Jung himself, had a slight "beep", which was unintentional. "Pink Soldiers", an a cappella composed by 23, was featured throughout the series. The recording of the jazz band and orchestral music was mostly done by the Budapest Scoring Orchestra featuring over 50-60 musicians, while the minimal piano and guitar portions were recorded by Jae-il himself. Additional instrumentation, include the rhythming of ethnic drums in the brief moments of the game. Jae-il initially requested on using heavy metal sounds in the score, but later disapproved as it would not feel appropriate to the scenes. The percussion instruments were imported from Brazil and Senegal to create a tense score.

Bálint Sapszon and Norbert Elek worked on the orchestration for the score, soundtrack and the classical pieces, at the Budapest Scoring Orchestra which was conducted by Péter Illényi. Sapszon and Elek stated that recording for the classical works were easier, as the compositions were written earlier and they only had to re-record the pieces.

=== Season 2 score ===
Jung returned to score the second season, with the soundtrack album being released on December 27, 2024, through Netflix Music. Jung confirmed his involvement in 2023, telling the BBC the second season would retain some elements from the score to the first season but have a "more bizarre and unique sound". The second season also features the aria "Nessun dorma" from Giacomo Puccini's Turandot and "Time to Say Goodbye" by Sarah Brightman and Andrea Bocelli.

== Track listings ==
Squid Game (Original Soundtrack from the Netflix Series) track listing
No.	Title	Music	Artist	Length
1.	"Way Back Then"	Jung Jae-il	Jung Jae-il	2:31
2.	"Round I"	Jung Jae-il	Jung Jae-il	1:19
3.	"The Rope Is Tied"	Jung Jae-il	Jung Jae-il	3:18
4.	"Pink Soldiers"	23	23	0:38
5.	"Hostage Crisis"	23	23	2:22
6.	"I Remember My Name"	Jung Jae-il		3:13
7.	"Unfolded..."	Jung Jae-il		2:38
8.	"Needles and Dalgona"	Park Min-ju		3:44
9.	"The Fat and the Rats"	Park Min-ju		1:52
10.	"It Hurts So Bad"	Jung Jae-il		1:13
11.	"Delivery"	23		4:55
12.	"Dead End"	23		5:25
13.	"Round VI"	Jung Jae-il		5:54
14.	"Wife, Husband and 4.56 Billion"	Jung Jae-il		4:26
15.	"Murder Without Violence"	Park Min-ju		1:53
16.	"Slaughterhouse III"	Jung Jae-il		8:16
17.	"Owe"	Jung Jae-il		2:26
18.	"Uh..."	Jung Jae-il		3:38
19.	"Dawn"	Jung Jae-il		6:41
20.	"Let's Go Out Tonight"	Jung Jae-il		3:27
Total length:				71:35

All tracks are written by Jung Jae-il, except where indicated.

Squid Game 2 (Soundtrack from the Netflix Series) track listing
No.	Title	Length
1.	"Way Forward"	4:04
2.	"O X I"	3:09
3.	"You're Nothing but a Puppet"	2:25
4.	"Pink Soldiers Redux" (Kim Sungsoo)	2:58
5.	"Vote I"	2:49
6.	"Let's Go Out!"	2:21
7.	"Round the Circle I"	3:35
8.	"Let Me Be a Part of the Game"	3:58
9.	"Jung-bae Ya!"	4:52
10.	"Round II"	2:06
11.	"No Way Back"	2:17
12.	"O X II"	3:30
13.	"Hyun-ju"	2:14
14.	"War"	2:41
15.	"A Five People Game" (Park Minjoo)	4:30
16.	"I Believe Your Courage"	1:14
17.	"The Team HJ"	2:25
18.	"Gong-gi with Bullets"	2:20
19.	"We're Together"	2:30
20.	"Funeral" (Kim Sungsoo)	3:25
21.	"A Toilet Fight I" (Park Minjoo)	3:10
22.	"Ddakji Man" (Park Minjoo)	2:41
23.	"Round the Circle V"	4:16
24.	"Molar I" (Park Minjoo)	0:41
25.	"A White Limousine II" (Park Minjoo)	1:33
26.	"Player vs Pink Guards" (Park Minjoo)	3:51
27.	"Player vs Pink Guards III" (Park Minjoo)	4:33
28.	"Counter Strike"	1:37
29.	"Don't Die in Vain"	4:01
Total length:		86:04

All tracks are written by Jung Jae-il, except where indicated.

Squid Game 3 (Soundtrack from the Netflix Series) track listing
No.	Title	Length
1.	"Across the Bridge"	3:49
2.	"Sacrifice II"	1:40
3.	"Daughter"	1:35
4.	"So It Goes"	3:55
5.	"Accomplished"	1:17
6.	"Sa Rahm"	1:34
7.	"Going On"	1:56
8.	"Birth and Death"	2:26
9.	"Jun-hee Ya"	3:03
10.	"Jump Rope Song"	1:22
11.	"Red & Blue" (Kim Sungsoo)	2:56
12.	"Enter" (Kim Sungsoo)	2:06
13.	"Jump Rope Entrance" (Park Minjoo)	2:53
14.	"A Mad Nam-gyu II" (Park Minjoo)	1:35
15.	"Halmooni"	1:32
16.	"The Final Decision"	1:28
17.	"I Know"	3:07
18.	"Kill 'Em All"	3:44
19.	"Farewell"	0:54
20.	"Hide & Seek Song" (Traditional)	0:36
Total length:		43:41

== Accolades ==
Year	Award	Category	Nominee(s)	Result	Ref.
2021	Hollywood Music in Media Awards	Score - TV Show/Limited Series	Jung Jae-il	Won	
2021	Golden Reel Awards	Outstanding Achievement in Sound Editing – Series 1 Hour – Comedy or Drama – Music	Jae-il Jung (for "Red Light, Green Light")	Nominated	
2022	Baeksang Arts Awards	Baeksang Arts Technical Award (Music)	Jung Jae-il	Won	
2022	Primetime Creative Arts Emmy Awards	Outstanding Original Main Title Theme Music	Jung Jae-il	Nominated	
