= List of Aquarion Evol episodes =

This is a list of episodes of the Aquarion Evol anime series. As the sequel to the 2005 anime series Genesis of Aquarion, Aquarion Evol is also produced by studio Satelight, with direction by Shoji Kawamori, now accompanied by Yūsuke Yamamoto and music compositions by Yoko Kanno. It was broadcast in Japan on TV Tokyo from January 8 to June 24, 2012.

So far four pieces of music were used as opening and ending songs. From episodes three to fifteen, the opening is"Kimi no Shinwa ~ Aquarion Dai 2 Shou" (君の神話～アクエリオン第二章, Kimi no Shinwa ~ Akuerion Dai Ni Shō; "Your Legend, Aquarion Chapter 2") and from episode 16 onwards is "Paradoxical ZOO" (パラドキシカルZOO), both performed by AKINO with bless4. The ending song from episodes two to fourteen is "Gekkō Symphonia" (月光シンフォニア, Gekkō Shinfonia; "Moonlight Symphonia") by AKINO & AIKI of bless4, while the ending song for episode 15 onwards is "Yunoha no Mori" (ユノハノモリ; "Yunoha's Forest") by Yui Ogura as Yunoha Thrul. Several pieces of music from the original Aquarion series' soundtrack are also featured as insert songs, among brand new compositions.

== Episode list ==
| No. | Title | Original release date |
|---|---|---|
| 1-02 | "The Mythical Forbidden Union that Embraces the End Special"; Transliteration: "Owari o Idaita Shinwateki Kinjirareta Gattai Supesharu" (Japanese: 終末を抱いた神話的禁じられた合体スペシャル) | January 8, 2012 |
12,000 years after the war against the Shadow Angels, Amata Sora spends his days working in a movie theater until he meets and befriends a girl his age named Mikono Suzushiro. When a mysterious invading force, known as "Abductors" from the planet Altair and led by Kagura Demuri, attacks, Amata and Mikono find themselves in danger, until Amata activates his hidden levitation power and unlocks the sealed power of Aquarion to form Aquarion Evol.
| 3 | "Love Index ☆ Skyrockets"; Transliteration: "Tokimeki Shisū ☆ Kyūjōshō" (Japanese: トキメキ指数☆急上昇) | January 15, 2012 |
After the previous battle, Amata and Mikono are brought to the Neo-DEAVA headquarters to evaluate their potential as Elements. Separated from Mikono and eager to meet her, Amata joins his classmate Andy W. Hole in an attempt to sneak underground into the female dorms, leading to an accident that put him on bad terms with her. Later, Amata is selected for a simulation battle, and he decides to make use of it to make amends with Mikono.
| 4 | "The Wall - Conquer Oneself -"; Transliteration: "Kabe ~conquer oneself~" (Japanese: 壁～conquer oneself～) | January 22, 2012 |
Believed to not have any elemental power at all, Mikono decides to leave the Neo-DEAVA Academy, but Kagura's comrade Jin Muso launches an attack on Vega. His tactics overpower the Aquarion Gepard, piloted by Mikono's brother Cayenne Suzushiro, that is until Neo-DEAVA's commander Zen Fudo reassumes his post and arranges for her to join the battle.
| 5 | "Romance Prohibition Order"; Transliteration: "Ren'ai Kinshi Rei" (Japanese: 恋愛禁止令) | January 29, 2012 |
With the separation between the male and female sections abolished, the Neo-DEAVA Academy becomes a coed institution, but Fudo declares that the Elements are expressibly forbidden to fall in love with each other. He later organizes an uncommon group activity to measure the compatibility between the pilots.
| 6 | "Agitato of Life"; Transliteration: "Seimei no Ajitāto" (Japanese: 生命のアジタート) | February 5, 2012 |
Kagura, who was enticed by Mikono's scent, reappears determined to take her with him, but Amata flees away with her in tow. To confront Kagura, Element Schrade Elan ignores the risks to his frail health, piloting the newly formed Aquarion Spada.
| 7 | "Midnight Girl"; Transliteration: "Mayonaka no Shōjo" (Japanese: 真夜中の少女) | February 12, 2012 |
Jin assembles a new remote-controlled machine and launches it to confront Aquarion. Amata and the others are pinned down by the enemy's lasers until they are assisted by another Element, Yunoha Thrul, who incorporates her invisibility powers into Aquarion Evol to allow a counterattack.
| 8 | "Expose"; Transliteration: "Sarakedase" (Japanese: さらけだせ) | February 19, 2012 |
Now piloting in person, Jin challenges Aquarion once more, but faces another reversal when Zessica Wong, piloting Aquarion Spada, finds a way to expose her abilities in a flashy manner to avoid his attacks.
| 9 | "Anagram of Man and Woman"; Transliteration: "Otoko to Onna no Anaguramu" (Japanese: 男と女のアナグラム) | February 26, 2012 |
Andy and his classmate MIX are unable to understand each other and are usually arguing, until some enemies appear to avenge Jin, who is believed to be dead. Andy and MIX put aside their differences to confront the enemies. After Andy takes a crucial hit, MIX takes over command and defeats the enemies with backfiring results.
| 10 | "One-Eyed Transfer Student"; Transliteration: "Sekigan no Tenkōsei" (Japanese: 隻眼の転校生) | March 4, 2012 |
Having survived the destruction of his machine, Jin infiltrates the Neo-DEAVA Academy posing as a transfer student. While searching for info about its female residents, he looks to find out if the "True Eve" the Alteans are desperately looking for is among them, until he is approached by Yunoha, who wants to befriend him.
| 11 | "Calling of the Wild"; Transliteration: "Yasei no Shōmei" (Japanese: 野性の召命) | March 11, 2012 |
Since his last battle with Aquarion, Kagura is restrained by the mysterious Towano Mykage until he manages to break free. This causes a huge commotion in Altair, as Kagura is desperate to find Mikono and claim her for himself.
| 12 | "Skies of Aquaria"; Transliteration: "Akueria no Mau Sora" (Japanese: アクエリアの舞う空) | March 18, 2012 |
The students organize a special meeting featuring a screening of "Skies of Aquaria", a feature film based on the events of 12,000 years before. Amata reveals to Mikono his connection with Alicia, the main actress of the film, who happens to be his mother that disappeared when he was a child. Meanwhile, Jin, who grows attached to Yunoha, decides to take her with him to Altair.
| 13 | "Fallen Giant"; Transliteration: "Ochita Kyojin" (Japanese: 堕ちた巨人) | March 25, 2012 |
Kagura wreaks havoc at the academy while Jin takes the opportunity to hijack one of the Vectors and escape with Yunoha. Mykage appears before Fudo, demanding the location of the original Aquarion, while Kagura easily overpowers the Elements with his power that allows him to reverse the laws of physics. Jin, moved by Yunoha's tears, has a change of heart and returns to assist the others against Kagura.
| 14 | "Beyond an Individual"; Transliteration: "Ko no Saki" (Japanese: 個の先) | April 1, 2012 |
The Elements mourn the deaths of Jin and the other students who perished in the previous battle. After their funeral, Fudo orders Andy to dig graves for all the remaining pilots to be buried alive as part of a special training. Mikono refuses to take part in the training, but when she feels her friends' lives in danger, she helps them by activating her own elemental power of connection.
| 15 | "Love Beasts"; Transliteration: "Ai no Kemono tachi" (Japanese: 愛の獣たち) | April 8, 2012 |
After the graveyard training is complete, Kagura appears before the other Elements and finally manages to kidnap Mikono. While searching for them, Zessica grows jealous of Amata's desperation to find Mikono and confesses to him that Kagura and Mikono may be the reincarnations of Apollo and Silvia, thus being destined to each other. Despite that, Amata confronts Kagura to rescue Mikono.
| 16 | "Soul's Confession"; Transliteration: "Tamashii no Kokuhaku" (Japanese: 魂の告白) | April 15, 2012 |
Fudo decides to hold a mock battle between two Aquarion despite being informed of the risks. Amata, Mikono and Zessica, all piloting Aquarion Evol, are overpowered by their opponents until Zessica confesses her love for Amata, triggering a reaction that displays the images of Apollo and Silvia along with the events regarding them 12,000 years before.
| 17 | "Well Up, Life!"; Transliteration: "Wakiagare, Inochi" (Japanese: 湧きあがれ、いのち) | April 22, 2012 |
The Elements are summoned by Fudo to take part into a secret mission. Ordered to stand by beside a lake while awaiting further instructions, they decide to have some fun together. Andy tries to make use of the situation to confess his feelings for MIX, just to unwillingly bring forth her fury on him. Soon another enemy appears, creating a blizzard that covers the entire area. As the Elements are about to be frozen to death, a hopeless Andy sinks into a hole created by his powers until hitting a stream of hot water, which then helps the others to fight back.
| 18 | "Rare Igura"; Transliteration: "Rea Igurā" (Japanese: レア・イグラー) | April 29, 2012 |
Informed that Altair is at the brink of collapse, Izumo Kamurogi, the commander of the Altean forces, finally takes into his hands the matter of obtaining the True Eve and attacks the Neo-DEAVA base by himself. The Elements little can do anything against Izumo, who demands the academy to surrender one of their female students. Zessica, heartbroken for having her feelings for Amata unrequited, volunteers herself to attend his request, until MIX tries to stop her and is captured by the enemy instead.
| 19 | "First Reunion"; Transliteration: "Hajimete no Saikai" (Japanese: はじめての再会) | May 6, 2012 |
It have been a week and Fudo still has not returned from his travel, and despite not knowing his whereabouts, Mikono leaves the academy to look for him. Meanwhile, Mykage appears before Zessica stating that he will open a dimensional gate to Altair, upon claiming some compensation from her in the future. A team of Elements is assembled to pass through the gate and infiltrate Altair, all in an attempt to rescue MIX.
| 20 | "MI・XY" | May 13, 2012 |
Amata discovers the dormant body of her mother and is approached by Izumo, who reveals to him that the True Eve is the only hope of survival to reverse the Curse of Eve, being the reason behind the Altean invasions on Vega. Andy breaks free from his imprisonment and keeps searching for MIX. Zessica and Yunoha start feeling strange and Shrade forms Aquarion Spada with them to pick up Amata and Andy. While struggling to escape from the Altean forces, the Elements confront an enemy machine piloted by no other than MIX herself.
| 21 | "Kiss"; Transliteration: "Seppun" (Japanese: 接吻) | May 20, 2012 |
Amata's team returns from Altair after failing to save MIX and Shrade's condition gets worse, while Mikono and Fudo keep traveling together in search of the Legendary Aquarion. After having a nightmare involving Mikono, Amata flees to the town where he first met her and he finds the place deserted. There, Kagura meets Amata and finally remembers the connection between them.
| 22 | "Wing of Revival"; Transliteration: "Fukkatsu no Tsubasa" (Japanese: 復活の翼) | May 27, 2012 |
Amata learns from Kagura how they, who once were one and the same were separated into two different beings. While Amata and Kagura have a vicious fight in front of Mikono, the original Aquarion is unburied and Shrade pushes his life to the limit to confront an enemy machine sent by Mykage.
| 23 | "Melody of Myth"; Transliteration: "Shinwa Senritsu" (Japanese: 神話センリツ) | June 3, 2012 |
Fudo assembles the remaining Elements and reveals to them all the truth regarding the events from the last 24,000 years and its connection with the present situation. Meanwhile, with his last ounce of strength, Schrade uses his powers to allow Zessica and Amata to cross safely to Altair. Labeling Mikono as their True Eve, Izumo and his forces attack Kagura, determined to take her from him by force, and Mykage finally claims his reward from Zessica by possessing her body.
| 24 | "ephemera" | June 10, 2012 |
Kagura boards the Legendary Aquarion to protect Mikono from Izumo's forces. Andy manages to open a dimensional hole to Altair with his power, and upon arriving there, he confronts MIX, trying to make her return to her former self. Meanwhile, Alicia finally awakens and reveals to Amata that Izumo is his true father, and she regrettably left him behind as a child since he was unable to travel to Altair with her.
| 25 | "Fragment of Adam"; Transliteration: "Adamu no Danpen" (Japanese: アダムの断片) | June 17, 2012 |
Believing that Kagura is the responsible for his parents' death, Amata launches himself against him and their confrontation opens a portal that puts Altair en route of collision with Vega. MIX regains her lost memories, thanks to Andy. After assuming full control of Zessica's body, Mykage makes use of Mikono and Kagura to take possession of the Legendary Aquarion for himself, converting it into his own mecha, the Ancient AQ.
| 26 | "LOVE" | June 24, 2012 |
The Elements, both living and dead, struggle against the Ancient AQ without success until Amata and Mikono get reunited. After confessing their feelings for each other, they form Aquarion's ultimate form, Aquarion LOVE to stop Mykage's plans and save both Vega and Altair from destruction.
