= Aquarion: Myth of Emotions =

Japanese anime television series

- Key visual

想星のアクエリオン Myth of Emotions (Sōsei no Akuerion Myth of Emotions)
- Genre: Action; Science fiction
- Created by: Shōji Kawamori; Satelight
- Predecessors
- Genesis of Aquarion (2005); Aquarion Evol (2012); Aquarion Logos (2015)
- Anime television series
- Directed by: Kenji Itoso; Hidetake Uchida (Kako Shinwa-hen)
- Written by: Sadayuki Murai
- Music by: Takashi Ohmama; Shu Kanematsu
- Studio: Satelight; Canna Japan (Kako Shinwa-hen)
- Licensed by: Crunchyroll
- Original network: Tokyo MX, TVA, tvk, BS Asahi
- Original run: January 10, 2025 – March 28, 2025
- Episodes: 12

Aquarion: Myth of Emotions (想星のアクエリオン Myth of Emotions, Sōsei no Akuerion Myth of Emotions) is a Japanese anime television series created by Shōji Kawamori and animated by Satelight, and the fourth series in the Aquarion franchise, after Genesis of Aquarion, Aquarion Evol and Aquarion Logos. It is directed by Kenji Itoso and written by Sadayuki Murai, with Masashi Kudo designing the characters and Takashi Ohmama and Shu Kanematsu composing the music. It aired from January 10 to March 28, 2025, on Tokyo MX and other channels. The opening theme song is "Aquarion: Myth of Emotions Ver. (創聖のアクエリオン Myth of Emotions Ver.)" performed by Akino of bless4 and Yoshiki Fukuyama (a remix of Akino's "Genesis of Aquarion" opening theme song of the 2005 anime), while the ending theme song is "Kokuhaku (告白)" (Confession) performed by Akino. Crunchyroll streamed the series.

== Plot ==
The series is set in Enoshima, Japan, where a group of middle-school students from the prestigious Private Enoshima Academy is selected to participate in the special "Element Class". Unaware to the public, the elements secretly fight monsters from other dimension that threaten to destroy the universe piloting the "Vector Machines", airships that can combine into the legendary giant, "Aquarion". Soon the elements discover the reason why they were chosen to pilot Aquarion and the connection between them, as all of them are reincarnations of mythic beings from 12,000 years ago.

== Characters ==
=== Elements ===
The main characters of the series who use their powers to pilot the vector machines and form Aquarion. Each of them is notable for the total lack of a specific emotion that they barely recover during the process of unification. The Vector Machines are named after runes: Sigel, Feoh and Tir whose appearance, powers and abilities are similar to Vectors Sol, Luna and Mars from the original Genesis of Aquarion respectively.

Sakko Ōtori (オオトリサッコ（鳳颯虎）, Ōtori Sakko)
Voiced by: Yumiri Hanamori
The main protagonist. A reckless boy who enjoys parkour and lacks the emotion of fear. He pilots Vector Sigel.
Momohime Amaha (アマハモモヒメ（天羽百々姫）, Amaha Momohime)
Voiced by: Azumi Waki
The main female and Sakko's childhood friend. She is one year older than the other boys and lacks the emotion of love. She pilots Vector Feoh.
Rimiya Tsukishiro (ツキシロリミヤ（月城璃美也）, Tsukishiro Rimiya)
Voiced by: Makoto Koichi
Toshi's close friend. He lacks the emotion of empathy, usually making seemingly cruel or senseless remarks with no intend of harm. He pilots Vector Tir.
Toshi Hatano (ハタノトシ（秦野外史）, Hatano Toshi)
Voiced by: Aki Toyosaki
Rimiya's close friend who is always carrying a book. He lacks the emotion of curiosity. He pilots Vector Tir.
Sayo Ichiki (イチキサヨ（一木沙依）, Ichiki Sayo)
Voiced by: Konomi Kohara
A childhood friend of Sakko and Momohime. She lacks the emotion of self-preservation and because of it, she always put herself in harm's way to protect others. She apparently dies during the beginning of the series. She piloted Vector Feoh in her first and last sortie.
Hana Ichiki (イチキハナ（一木ハナ）, Ichiki Hana)
Voiced by: Konomi Kohara
Sayo's younger sister who constantly attacked her and almost killed her on a few occasions. This occurred because she lacks the emotion of hatred which makes her attacking the people she loves as a misplaced sign of affection. She later attacks Momohime for the same reason, who realizing her condition, accepts her feelings while asking her to not attack anyone else. She pilots Vector Feoh.
Sun (サン, San)
Voiced by: Hiroki Nanami
A mysterious boy who transfers to the school and appears to know more than he lets on about the Elements and their mission.

=== Space Preservation Society ===
An international organization developed to protect Earth from invaders from another dimension. They have a base in Enoshima where the Vector Machines are stationed, disguised as members of Private Enoshima Academy's faculty. They count with the assistance of the state of the art, AI computer DEAVA who is responsible for selecting the Elements most suited for each battle and develop combat strategies.

Kyōko Munakata (ムナカタキョウコ（宗方響子）, Munakata Kyōko)
Voiced by: Kiyono Yasuno
Kazuhiko Saruta (猿田一彦, Saruta Kazuhiko)
Voiced by: Yūmi Yuzu
Awakening Conference
An international committee that oversees the Space Preservation Society's activities composed of individuals from several nations who speak in their native languages, including English, Chinese, Russian and French.
Voiced by: Adrian Howard, Daria Kudryashova, Jiang Haining and Simon Benguigui

=== Kako Shinwa-hen ===
Characters from a mythical period 12.000 years ago who reincarnated into the modern world as the Elements.

Nanūk (ナヌーク, Nanūku)
Voiced by: Junya Enoki
Sakko's previous incarnation.
Sedona (セドナ)
Voiced by: Yui Ishikawa
Momohime's previous incarnation and Haida's older sister.
Haida (ハイダ)
Voiced by: Nao Tōyama
Rimiya's previous incarnation and Sedona's younger sister.
Sukuna (スクナ)
Voiced by: Ryōta Ōsaka
Toshi's previous incarnation.
Futago (フタゴ)
Voiced by: Shiori Kawabata
A pair of twins who were Sayo and Hana's previous incarnations.
Murua Satene (ムルア・サテネ)
Voiced by: M.A.O
The goddess of chaos formerly worshiped by the Shadow Angels and mother of the Mythic Beasts.
