= Brandon Potter =

American voice actor (born 1982)

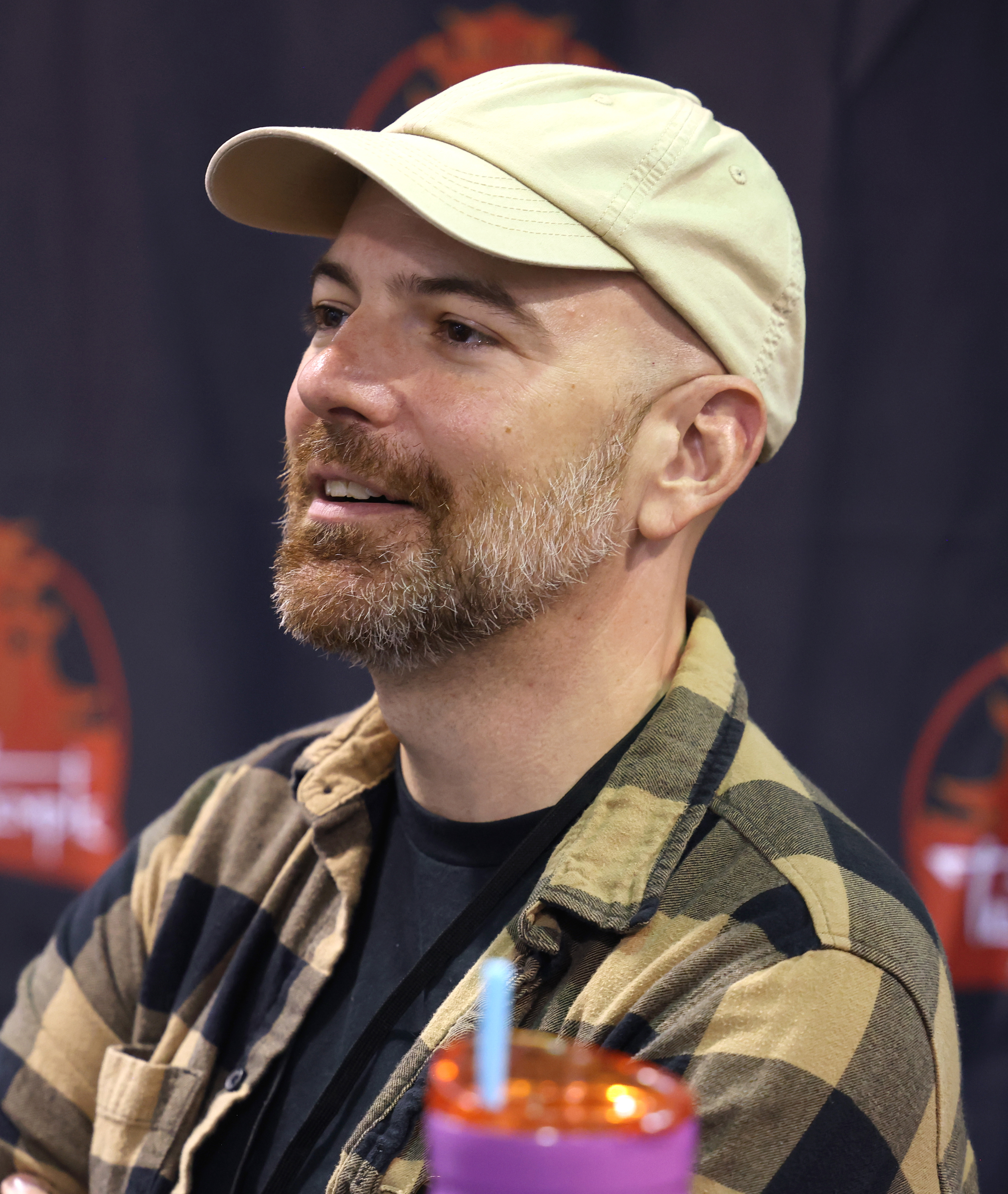
- Potter in 2026
- Born: Charles Brandon Potter; July 28, 1982 (age 44)
- Occupations: Voice actor; ADR director; writer
- Years active: 2004–present

Charles Brandon Potter (born July 28, 1982) is an American voice and television actor. He is known for his voice work, directing, and screenplay writing for anime as well as for playing the role of Quintus in the streaming series, The Chosen. In anime, he is best known for his role as Gazelle (real name and also known as Jiro), the head of a courier agency, smuggler, and member of Generation Bleu in the anime series Eureka Seven: AO. He is also best known for his roles as Shanks in the anime series One Piece and as Kenji Harima in the anime series School Rumble.

== Filmography ==
=== Anime series ===
List of voice performances in anime series
Year	Title	Role	Notes	Ref.
2006	Black Cat	Sven Vollfied		
2007	School Rumble	Harima	Main role	
2008	One Piece	Shanks		
2008	Ouran High School Host Club	Kadomatsu		
2008	Darker Than Black	Gai Kurasawa		
2009	Genesis of Aquarion	Commander Gen Fudo		
2012	Sekirei: Pure Engagement	Himura		
2012	.hack//Quantum	Iyoten		
2013	Last Exile: Fam, the Silver Wing	Vincent		
2013	Eureka Seven: AO	Gazelle (Jiro)		
2013	Appleseed XIII	Liesse		
2013	We Without Wings	DJ Conor		
2013	Aquarion Evol	Zen		
2014	Kamisama Kiss	Akura-Ohm, Kirihito (Season 2)		
2014	Karneval	Uro		
2015	Unbreakable Machine-Doll	Bronson		
2015	Gangsta	Nicolas Brown		
2016	Black Butler: Book of Murder	Charles Phips		
2016	91 Days	Fango		
2016	Alderamin on the Sky	Neijif		
2016	Izetta: The Last Witch	Otto		
2016	Aquarion Logos	Shinji Hatano		
2016	All Out!!	Wada		
2017	Gosick	Superintendent General Signore		
2017	Knight's & Magic	Ambrosius		
2017	Chronos Ruler	Aiks		
2017	My Hero Academia	Gunhead		
2017	The Morose Mononokean	Tatsuma Fujiwara		
2017	The Saga of Tanya the Evil	Moritz Paul von Hans		
2017	Samurai Warriors	Keiji Maeda		
2018	Tokyo Ghoul:re	Shinohara		
2018	Black Clover	Rhya		
2018	Kakuriyo: Bed & Breakfast for Spirits	Tokohiko		
2018	Free! -Dive to the Future-	Azuma		
2018	Overlord III	Magic Caster		
2018	B't X	Leon	Anime Midstream/Sound Cadence dub	
2018	Hinomaru Sumo	Yuma		
2018	Ace Attorney Season 2	Godot		
2018	SSSS.Gridman	Tonkawa's Dad		
2018	That Time I Got Reincarnated as a Slime	Vesta		
2018	Ulysses: Jeanne d'Arc and the Alchemist Knight	Glasdale		
2018	Double Decker! Doug & Kirill	Cooper		
2019	Kono Oto Tomare! Sounds of Life	Takinami		
2019	One Piece: Episode of East Blue - Luffy and His Four Friends' Great Adventure	Shanks	Television special	
2019	Special 7: Special Crime Investigation Unit	Ichinose	Main role	
2019	Stars Align	Kenji Kyobate	Main role	
2020	Appare-Ranman!	Richard		
2020	Fire Force	Mr Boyle		
2021	The World Ends with You the Animation	Hanekoma		
2022	Tales of Luminaria the Fateful Crossroad	Raoul		
2022	Arifureta: From Commonplace to World's Strongest Season 2	Freid Bagwa		

=== Film ===
List of voice performances in film
Year	Title	Role	Notes	Ref.
2015	Ghost in the Shell: The New Movie	Ishikawa		
2022	One Piece Film: Red	Shanks		
2022	Fruits Basket: Prelude	Teacher		

=== Live-action ===
List of acting performances in live-action films and series
Year	Title	Role	Format/notes	Ref.
2018	Little Woods	Dale	Film	
2019–present	The Chosen	Quintus	TV series	Main/recurring role, 4 seasons
2019–2024	The Inside Man	Maurice	Security Training and Awareness video series	Recurring role
2022	Family Camp	Bramberger	Film	

=== Video games ===
List of voice performances in video games
Year	Title	Role	Notes	Ref.
2012	Borderlands 2	Pyro Pete, Interviewer		
2016	Dragon Ball Xenoverse 2	Appule		
2019	Borderlands 3	Narrator (Bounty of Blood)		
2020	Dragon Ball Z: Kakarot	Appule		
2021	Tales of Luminaria	Raoul		

=== Production credits ===
List of production credits
Year	Title	Role	Notes	Ref.
2016	Alderamin on the Sky	ADR director		
