= List of Aquarion Evol characters =

This is a list of characters from the manga and anime series Aquarion Evol.

== Characters ==
=== Elements ===
Just like in the original series, the Elements are youngsters with special powers trained to pilot the vectors against enemy invaders. While forming Aquarion, the elemental powers of the users are amplified allowing Aquarion to perform special attacks depending on its current pilots. To increase Aquarion's flexibility in combat, a special teleport system labeled "Element Change" allows pilots to be called back and forth between the vectors's cockpits and their posts at Neo-DEAVA's command center instantly.

Amata Sora (アマタ・ソラ)
Voiced by: Yūki Kaji (Japanese); Christopher Bevins (English)
The main protagonist whose elemental power is Anti-Gravity (空中飛翔, Kūchū Hishō). It can be channeled within the Aquarion allowing it to have flight capabilities. Unable to control his powers as it activates every time he is scared or excited, he wears special boots with weights so as to prevent his elemental power in case it accidentally activates. As a child, people thought of him as a freak, thus shunned his ability until he used it to protect Mikono from an attack of the Abductors and took control of a vector, breaking the seal in Aquaria that prevented union between male and female pilots and form Aquarion Evol. It is shown that he has "Wings" on his feet, which implies that he is a bearer of the "Solar Wings" just like Apollonius and Apollo before him. Amata is hated by Cayenne Suzushiro since he is the reason why Mikono gets close to the Aquarion.
Amata is actually Alicia's son, abandoned by her when he was a child, he grew up angry at her for leaving him behind, until she reveals to him that she left Vega to help his father Izumo, not taking him with her to ensure his safety. It was also during that moment, that he was split into two different beings by Mykage, the other being Kagura. After finishing the Special Training of the Grave devised by Zen Fudo he can now freely summon the Wings on his feet and is able to create a special skill called Detachment Wings allowing him to deflect Kagura's Power of Reversal.
Later it is revealed by Fudo that both Amata and Kagura each hold a half of the soul of Apollo, the main protagonist of Genesis of Aquarion and its previous incarnation, the Winged Hound Pollon which was Apollonius' pet companion and had an unrequited love for his lover Celiane, wishing to the heavens to revive as a human for reciprocal love in their next reincarnation cycle. Twelve thousand years later, Pollon revives as Apollo, and during his forced separation from Sylvia de Alisia, Celiane's reincarnation, they promise to meet again in twelve thousand years, leading to their rebirth as Amata and Mikono respectively. In the final battle against Mykage, Amata tells Mikono that he was reborn to understand the sorrow that Silvia felt when he (as Apollo) left her and that he won't leave her this time. With a bit of help from Kagura who realizes that while his love for Mikono comes from Apollo's love for Silvia, Amata's love is for Mikono's current self. Upon Amata's and Mikono's reunion, the Aquarion sheds tears of joy reversing the damage caused by Mykage.
Mikono Suzushiro (ミコノ・スズシロ)
Voiced by: Ai Kayano (Japanese); Brina Palencia (English)
The main heroine who comes from a famous and long lineage of Element users, but is believed to not have any elemental power unlike her elder brother. Mikono became shy towards other people due to the fact that she was believed to be the only one in her family without an elemental power, until it was revealed that she actually has an ability called the Power to Connect (繋ぐ力, Tsunagu Chikara), that links together the minds and feelings of others, thus becoming an irreplaceable asset to Neo-DEAVA.
Despite gradually falling in love with Amata, Mikono somehow feels herself attracted to Kagura, a union deemed forbidden by Zen Fudo and disastrous by her brother Cayenne who had an ominous and enigmatic vision of her wedding him dressed in mourning clothes, although there are several indications that she may be the reincarnation of Sylvia de Alisia, the heroine of the original Aquarion series, and Kagura being the reincarnation of her beloved Apollo. Although Mikono's connection with Sylvia is later proved true, Kagura is revealed to only contain half of Apollo's soul, being the other in Amata.
Zessica Wong (ゼシカ・ウォン, Zeshika Won)
Voiced by: Kana Hanazawa (Japanese); Caitlin Glass (English)
A female student in rather revealing clothes who took an interest on Amata and likes to tease him, much to Mikono's displeasure. Her elemental power is called Power of Distortion (捻れの力, Nejire no Chikara) that allows her to utilize telekinetic powers. Eventually she falls in love with Amata and gets jealous of his closeness with Mikono. Upon suspecting that Mikono and Kagura might be the reincarnation of Sylvia and Apollo, she feels sad for Amata despite knowing that he loves Mikono, she fears Mikono might leave him for Kagura because of it.
Heartbroken because she knows her feelings for Amata are unrequited, Zessica offers herself to accompany Izumo back to Altair as he requested, but is stopped by MIX, who is captured in her place instead. While grieving about MIX's capture, she is approached by Mykage who offers her a chance to rescue MIX by opening a dimensional gate to Altair, but stating that a compensation would be claimed later, which is revealed to be her body's possession by him. With her part on his plans fulfilled, Mykage frees her when she threatens to have herself killed by Kagura to stop him, and she joins Amata in the final battle against him.
Cayenne Suzushiro (カイエン・スズシロ, Kaien Suzushiro)
Voiced by: Kenichi Suzumura (Japanese); Jason Liebrecht (English)
Elder brother of Mikono. He is popular and known among the girls of the academy. His elemental power is called Prophecy of Despair (絶望予知, Zetsubō Yochi) which allows him to foretell when disaster is about to befall those near him, and makes use of it to perfect his sniping skills. He has an aggressive attitude towards Amata since Mikono was brought into the academy along him, as he usually has tragic visions about his sister connected with Aquarion, although he admitted to his sister what it was Amata himself the first to realize that Mikono was truly trying to overcome her previously weak and hopeless personality.
After finishing the Special Training of the Grave devised by Zen Fudo he can now use his elemental powers to predict a moment of the future to know where the enemy's next move will commence.
Andy W. Hole (アンディ・W・ホール, Andi Daburu Hōru)
Voiced by: Kousuke Toriumi (Japanese); Jessie James Grelle (English)
Wielding the elemental power of Hole Digging (穴掘り力, Anahori Ryoku), Andy could find a weak point on any structure in order to open a hole on it. Though eager to make union with girls, so far he was the only main Element who failed to do so, as he was usually called back and replaced by another Element when he has the opportunity. After finishing the Special Training of the Grave devised by Zen Fudo his power become stronger allowing him to dig chains of holes without breaking a sweat, and even opening holes on other surfaces like glass or metal.
Initially he had serious issues with MIX due to her bad treatment of men in general, specially to him, though he does consider her attractive. Their relationship gets better after a battle when he risked his life to protect her by shielding her vector from an enemy attack with his own, to the point he decides to confess his love for her, however when he got the courage to do so, he ended up creating a misunderstanding that led to her getting angry on him, leaving him on a depressive state that had his powers out of control, usually sinking his body into the earth. His stupor lasts until he witness MIX being abducted by the Alteans, much to his despair, and upon seeing MIX converted into a male soldier working with the Alteans, his powers go berserk, creating a compact black hole. Since his return from Altair, Andy's powers seem out of control, to the point of unwillingly sinking into the ground. The only places he can surely stand without risk of sinking are the holes filled with MIX's ability as their structures possesses no weak point.
Later he managed to control his power of creating black holes to allow Aquarion to travel freely between Vega and Altair, and even learned to reopen holes closed by MIX, which he previously could not do, in an attempt to reach her brainwashed self. After properly confessing his feelings to MIX, thus helping her to regain her senses, Andy fulfills his dream of having his first coed union with her during the final battle against Mykage.
Shrade Elan (シュレード・エラン, Shurēdo Eran)
Voiced by: Daisuke Namikawa (Japanese); Eric Vale (English)
The most popular and the top student of the academy, who is never sent out in Aquaria due to his weak stamina. His elemental power Soul Performance (精神演奏, Seishin Ensō) uses the medium of sound to control the emotions of others. He has a calm yet mildly sadistic personality. It is stated by Donar Dantes that among the students that he possesses the strongest elemental power, however this offset by the fact that piloting the Aquarion would consume his life force. He is the first person to use Vector Y as the head following Amata breaking the Guize Stones, resulting into Aquarion Spada.
After finishing the Special Training of the Grave devised by Zen Fudo, Shrade's ability becomes stronger to the point that he can use his abilities without an instrument by playing an ethereal violin created with his powers. His body's condition worsens after exerting himself while on a mission to rescue MIX on Altair, but despite that, he kept piloting Aquarion Spada fearing he would not live enough to complete the melody he envisioned involving Aquarion and the planets Vega and Altair. He ultimately manages to do so in the dimensional limbo between Altair and Vega, managing to have his comrades Amata and Zessica reaching Altair safely while he stays behind, perishing along the way, and the melody he composed written in the Book of Twin Stars with his blood. However, his vector reappears during the final battle, and when Cayenne boards it, Shrade's spirit merges with his to create the Aquarion Gepada.
MIX
Voiced by: Ayumi Fujimura (Japanese); Alexis Tipton (English)
Initially coming off as a strict and serious student that shows disgust towards the opposite sex, MIX claimed that men are unneeded to battle the Abductors. Although Andy W. Hole was usually the most annoyed by her misandry, he still finds her very attractive. Her elemental power Spatial Augmentation (空間補填, Kūkan Hoten) is the opposite of Andy's elemental power, the ability to fill in any type of hole. She was the one responsible for filling up and closing the holes dug by Andy. Upon finishing the Special Training of the Grave devised by Zen Fudo her powers were enhanced allowing her to continuously close chains of holes easily.
MIX's father was a writer for a magazine, writing reviews and guides for sightseeing attractions who fell in love with a woman he met at the little hole-in-a-wall bathhouse hinting that her father left her family because of it, thus she became disgusted with men and doesn't want to talk about her father, also explaining for her hatred of holes in general. After Andy risked himself to protect her she starts to treat him better but was still at odds with him. As a direct result of this, she develops feelings towards him but pushed them out of the way due to an incident where he tried to confess to her. When Izumo demands Neo-DEAVA to surrender one of its female students to Altair, MIX tries to avoid Zessica from turning herself to them and ends up captured and taken away with them instead. With her body and mind turned masculine by the Altean Curse of Eve disease, MIX is brainwashed and enlisted into the Altean military with her own personal machine under the name of "MIXY" until Andy confesses to her and manages to bring her back to her senses, as she reciprocates them. Due to this, in the final battle, she performs a coed union with him and some time after returning home, her body is also restored to its original state.
Sazanka Bianca (サザンカ・ビアンカ, Sazanka Bianka)
Voiced by: Megumi Nakajima (Japanese); Tia Ballard (English)
An energetic girl in rustic clothes. Like her fellow girl students she admires both Cayenne and Shrade, resulting in her being electrocuted by the device used in the Test. This implies that her attraction may be a desire towards seeing them attracted to one another, proving that she is a fujoshi. Sazanka's ability is the Power of Corrosion (腐食力, Fushoku Ryoku), that rusts away any metal exposed to it, reflecting her fujoshi nature, as in English it can be translated as "rotten girl".
Malloy Direzza (モロイ・ドレッツァ, Moroi Dorettsa)
Voiced by: Kensuke Sato (Japanese); Ian Sinclair (English)
A dark-skinned male with the Power of Fragility (脆弱力, Zeijaku Ryoku), able to nullify the mechanical resistance of any structure, rendering it fragile to any kind of impact be it weak or strong. Just like the other Elements, there is no hints about his nationality, although he claims he is from the south, possibly African or South American.
Yunoha Thrul (ユノハ・スルール, Yunoha Surūru)
Voiced by: Yui Ogura (Japanese); Luci Christian (English)
The youngest of the Element users with a shy personality. Her elemental power Optical Fluoroscopy (光学透化, Kōgaku Tōka) turns her invisible which make her transparent to light, which can extend to Aquarion itself for brief moments at a time, but typically involves her turning herself invisible, while her toy frog-like cat doll remains visible. As a result, when she moves, it tends to seem as the doll is being levitated, leading her classmates to believe that the doll is alive, until she piloted a Vector to form Aquarion. After her identity is revealed to Amata and the others, she starts hanging out with them and showing herself but still turns invisible when shy. It is implied she has a crush on Amata, seeing as how she once bought a picture of him.
After Jin transfers into Neo-DEAVA, she ends up getting close to him. However, she was so distraught over his death that she almost erased her very existence in the world. After the Greveyard training, not only has Yunoha managed to overcome her loss, but her powers increase, allowing her to render objects invisible without making contact with them.
Jin Muso (ジン・ムソウ, Jin Musō)
Voiced by: Jun Fukushima (Japanese); Todd Haberkorn (English)
Originally a member of the Altean forces, Jin is Izumo's second in command, preferring to employ furtive tactics against his opponents. He is calm and a good analyst, his quick thinking allows him to execute his attacks and strategies perfectly. He is also a sharpshooter. As the last Altean born before the death of all women in the planet, he is usually called as the last son of Altair by Izumo.
After being defeated a couple of times, Jin manages to infiltrate the Neo-DEAVA academy as a transfer student under the name Akbarjin Batbayar, but coincidentally, the other students nicknamed him Jin. There he becomes attached to Yunoha and obtains his elemental power, the Power To Isolate (断ち切る力, Tachikiru Chikara) that allows him to create energy barriers. Despite knowing he is not who he claims to be, both Fudo and Crea view Jin's power as an invaluable asset to the team.
Believing that Yunoha is the "True Eve" the Altairs are desperately looking for, he makes use of Kagura's sudden invasion of Neo-DEAVA's academy to take her with him to his home planet. However, upon seeing Yunoha desperation to protect her friends, he returns to help them defeat Kagura, but was killed by Mykage as a punishment for ruining his plans. His soul returns during the final battle and possesses Yunoha's plush toy, allowing them to be together.
Kagura Demuri (カグラ・デムリ)
Voiced by: Kōki Uchiyama (Japanese); Taliesin Jaffe (English)
Izumo's subordinate, and the man whom Cayenne saw beside Mikono in his "wedding in mourning clothes" vision. Upon feeling Mikono's scent, he developed an obsession with her and since then is determined to claim her at all costs, usually disobeying orders to search for her. His sense of smell is so strong that he could track someone similar to that of canines. When on board his Mithra Gnis his sense of smell is so strong that he could even smell the pilots inside Aquarion.
For some reason Kagura's appearance, attitude and behavior resemble those of Apollo, the protagonist of the original Aquarion series, although such aspects of Kagura's personality seem to be heavily influenced by Mykage including having memories of Apollo and Silvia's love, after awakening those memories within him, he started dubbing Mikono as his own Silvia. Later it is revealed that Kagura is a split personality of Amata, created by Mykage, who needed the Solar Aquarion's chosen element (Apollo) to recover and take control of it. During Alicia's departure to Altair, Kagura followed her leaving Amata behind, only to lose her and end up with Mykage who erases his memories and raises him.
Kagura has also been revealed as an element user with the Power of Reversal (逆さまの力, Sakasama no Chikara) allowing him to reverse the laws of physics such as turning fire into ice or reversing the blood flow within one's body stated by Zen. Just like it occurs with other Elements, Kagura's reversing power is sometimes reflected on his speech, specially regarding Mikono, as the more he craves for her, the more he insults and threatens her, much to her horror, until she learns the true meaning behind his seemingly harsh words. During the final battle against Mykage, Kagura finally recognizes that while his feelings for Mikono come from Apollo's love for Silvia, Amata's love is towards Mikono's current self, thus he helps him retrieve her from Mykage's mercy.
In Genesis of Aquarion LOVE, he is shown to have become a member of Neo-DEAVA. Upon sniffing a smell he didn't like, he goes into the dimensional gap, leading him into a fight between his Aquarion EVOL and Apollo's Solar Aquarion.
Aye Chang (エイ・チャン, Ei Chan)
Voiced by: Yūka Hirose (Japanese); Leah Clark (English)
Aika (アイカ)
Voiced by: Satomi Moriya (Japanese); Kara Edwards (English)
Mist (ミスト, Misuto)

=== Neo-DEAVA ===
Neo-DEAVA is the organization responsible for Aquarion and the Elements that pilot it, in a position similar to its ancestor DEAVA 12,000 years before. Its headquarters is situated near Neo-Kowloon, a huge metropolis inspired by Hong Kong.

Donar Dantes (ドナール・ダンテス, Donāru Dantesu)
Voiced by: Junichi Suwabe (Japanese); Justin Cook (English)
A veteran soldier and chief of Neo-DEAVA's male academy. He uses a pair of prosthetic arms to replace those he lost on a disastrous incident when he piloted Aquarion on its first sortie against the Abductors eight years before. This also resulted in the disappearance of the other two pilots (including his girlfriend). His arms are replaced with special prosthetic limbs that can contain a variety of weapons, from hooks and a blowgun to a powerful energy cannon.
According to Fudo, the incident involving Donar was caused by having two Elements in love piloting Aquarion together as a consequence of Apollo and Silvia's separation 12,000 years before, but to bring forth the true power of Aquarion, the pilots must have strong feelings for each other that must never develop into love.
Suomi Konepi (スオミ・コネピ, Suomi Konepi)
Voiced by: Sanae Kobayashi (Japanese); Colleen Clinkenbeard (English)
Dressed as a nun, she runs Neo-DEAVA's female academy. It is implied that just like Donar she is a veteran Element user but her powers are never revealed. Also it is hinted that by the end of the series she has a relationship with him.
Zen Fudo (不動・ZEN, Fudō Zen)
Voiced by: Keiji Fujiwara (Japanese); Brandon Potter (English)
An enigmatic character with an eyepatch who is the supreme commander of Neo-DEAVA and offers guidance to the Elements to help them attain their full potential by using magic tricks, in a fashion similar to Gen Fudo in the original Aquarion series. Later it is revealed that he is indeed the same Gen Fudo of the original series, and during his union with Apollo and Sirius to save the planet, Toma realizes that Gen is the true reincarnation of Apollonius, and after Mykage is defeated, he confines his essence inside his body rendering him unable to cause further harm.
Fudo claims that he is an immovable being whose presence lies anywhere, protecting over all the living things, in a reference to the Hindu deity Acalanātha, also known as Fudō in Japanese mythology.
Crea Dolosera (クレア・ドロセラ, Kurea Dorosera)
Voiced by: Sakura Tange (Japanese); Carrie Savage (English)
Despite looking like a child, she is a genius with an IQ beyond 300 and chairwoman of Neo-DEAVA, usually displaying a mature attitude despite her uncommon craving for donuts. She is the one responsible for recruiting Shrade Elan (hence her caring for his well-being) and for giving the signal of approval for the unification of the Vectors. Prior to the beginning of the story and after the prohibition of using Aquarion she is said to be in a trip, returning after the Aquarion's debut once the seal is broken and the wall separating the girls and boys section is destroyed. Later she is revealed to be also an Element User with the power of teleportation, joining the others in the final battle against Mykage.

=== Altair ===
The home planet of the invaders dubbed "Abductors" by the people of Vega. Years ago prior to the story, the women of Altair suddenly stopped giving birth to girls, and those who were alive started dying one by one until only the men were left. Since then they started abducting women living in Vega to ensure the preservation of their race. However, all women they capture are also afflicted by the disease, eventually dying or transforming into men in mind and body. Unluckily some Alterian abductors are captured and executed by Vega forces.

Since then the Alteans started looking for females with strong elemental powers dubbed as Rare Iguras (レア・イグラー, Rea Igurā) hoping that one of them may withstand the disease and become their "True Eve". Altair is a heavily industrialized planet powered by Ianthe, a machine developed by Izumo's mother and revealed to be the true cause of the disease, as the energy it provides comes from the planet's life force itself.

Later it is revealed that both Altair and Vega were once the same planet, separated after the Tree of Life's collapse twelve thousand years before in Genesis of Aquarion.

Towano Mykage (トワノ・ミカゲ, Towano Mikage)
Voiced by: Yuichi Nakamura (Japanese); J. Michael Tatum (English)
The main antagonist of Aquarion Evol. A mysterious entity who was sleeping in a glass-like coffin, he seems to have some connection to the incident involving Aquarion 9 years before. He has no interest in saving the Altean race from extinction, as his true objective is to awaken the original Aquarion that buried itself under Vega's surface 12,000 years before and claim it for himself on his plan to have both Altair and Vega destroyed and recreated into one single world with him as its god.
Mykage has a striking resemblance to Toma, a Shadow Angel and the main antagonist of the original Aquarion series. Later it is revealed that Mykage is indeed a fragment of Toma's soul, albeit without a physical form, created upon his despair over figuring that Apollo was not the reincarnation of Apollonius as he always believed. After Mykage possesses Zessica's body, he moves forward with his plan to use Mikono and Kagura to hijack the Legendary Aquarion and convert it into the "Ancient AQ". After his plans are foiled by Mikono and Amata, Mykage seeks another body to possess just to end up confined inside Fudo, unable to control him, but unable to leave, ironically reunited with the person he always loved.
Izumo Kamurogi (イズモ・カムロギ)
Voiced by: Hiroki Yasumoto (Japanese); Mike McFarland (English)
The elusive and mysterious commander of the Altean forces. He is usually calm but could also be extremely enraged at matters concerning Alicia. He has powers that is almost similar those used by Vega's element users. He proved to be a far stronger and more experienced pilot than his subordinates, making use of his personal machine Ahura Gnis to easily deflect all attacks used against it.
Later it is revealed that Izumo is Amata's father, who met Alicia when his mecha crash-landed on Vega. The two fell in love, but Izumo ended up returning to Altair, forced to bring her back with him when Mykage revealed her existence. Izumo is mortally wounded by Solar Aquarion's Mugen Punch when he gets distraught over Alicia's safety. Just after realizing the true nature of the Curse of Eve, Izumo dies in his son's arms, rejoining Alicia in spirit.

=== Other characters ===
Shush (シュシュ, Shushu)
Voiced by: Kiyono Yasuno (Japanese); Monica Rial (English)
Mikono's pet cat, who is usually hidden into her hair dubbing as a hairpin that has the habit of attacking anyone who gets too close to her, specially Amata, as Mikono claims that it does it out of jealousy. So far the only ones it does not get angry at are Mikono herself, and for some reason Kagura.
Alicia (アリシア, Arishia)
Voiced by: Rie Tanaka (Japanese); Stephanie Young (English)
Alicia is Amata's mother and a famous actress in Vega who played Sylvie's part in "Skies of Aquaria", a feature film based on events of the original Aquarion series 12,000 years before. She met Amata's father Izumo after he crash-lands with his mecha on Vega and saves him by treating his wounds. Eventually Alicia and Izumo to fall in love, giving birth to Amata some time after Izumo return to Altair. Late she decides to depart to Altair to help Izumo deal with the Curse of Eve, leaving Amata behind fearing for his safety, and believing she would soon return. However, Alicia falls into a deathlike sleep after passing through the dimensional gate. Since then her body is preserved on a stasis chamber guarded by Izumo.
Alicia finally awakens before Amata and reveals to him the truth behind her actions, just before being killed by some debris caused by the Legendary Aquarion due to Mykage's interference.

== Mecha ==
=== Neo-DEAVA ===
==== Vectors ====
The Vectors are vehicles used by Neo-DEAVA to retaliate against the Abductors. There are three different kinds of Vectors making up a set for combinations. It is an Element user piloted vehicle capable of combining into Aquaria, and later Aquarion. Though armed, the damage done by the Vectors are minuscule and are only used for driving off or distracting enemies, or if the pilot is in a tight spot. In total, Neo-DEAVA is in possession of six different Vectors, two of each type with one set for the boys and one set for the girls initially, though in most sorties only one of each set is used at a time, with the other set serving as back-up. Distinction based on sex is abolished later when co-ed combinations are allowed later in the series, although one-set-only-sorties is still maintained.

- Vector Z (Zed) (ベクター ゼド, Bekutā Zedo): It forms the head of Aquarion Evol, and it resembles Vector Sol from the original series.
- Vector X (Ix) (ベクター イクス, Bekutā Ikusu): It forms the head of Aquarion Gepard, and it resembles Vector Mars from the original series.
- Vector Y (Silon) (ベクター シロン, Bekutā Shiron): It forms the head of Aquarion Spada, unlike the other two vector doesn't resemble the corresponding vector of the first series, the Vector Luna, but more like the Vector Sol.

==== Aquarion ====
Aquarion is a powerful robot formed from the combination of the three Vectors. Each combination of the Vectors produces a different Aquarion mode. Dubbed as the Machine Angel (機械天使, Kikai Tenshi) by Altair.

- Aquarion Evol (アクエリオンEVOL, Akuerion Evoru): Aquarion Evol is the result of the combination of Neo-DEAVA's Vectors with Vector Z as the head. It shares many similarities with the original series' Solar Aquarion as it is the most balanced form, can sport and manifest the Solar Wings, and fights barehanded. The weapon located on its head can be used as a long range weapon as seen in one episode whilst battling the Radius Gnis Heavy Armor. It is shown that Donar Dantes, together with two other Element users whose names are unknown, were able to execute and use Aquarion Evol eight years prior to the events of the first episode. However, it went berserk and caused a tragic disaster, and according to Zen Fudo, this occurred because Aquarion was being piloted by two Elements in love with each other, one being Donar. Since the return of Aquarion it has been piloted almost exclusively by Amata in the TV series (Mix pilots it in episode 9) and by Kagura in the Genesis of Aquarion LOVE OVA, capable of the following special attacks:
  - Flying Love Attack (触愛・天翔突, Furaingu Rabu Atakku): Incorporates Amata's levitation power to grab its target and fly out of the atmosphere to slam its target into an asteroid.
  - Mugen Attack (無限拳, Mugen Panchi): Performs its own version of Solar Aquarion's signature move from the original series, extending its arm indefinitely to reach the enemy. Once it extends long enough to circle around the entire planet twice.
  - Subliminal Punch (幻影明滅拳, Saburiminaru Panchi): Incorporates Yunoha Thrul's Invisibility Element to refract an enemy barrage of lasers while launching a powerful punch.
  - Absolute Clam (絶対封印, Abusoryūto Kuramu): Incorporates Mix's special augmentation to fill in the gaps and vents in the enemies' weapons and armor, causing them to overload and explode.
  - Super Dimensional Mugen Attack (超時空無限拳, Chōjikū Mugen Panchi): A Mugen Attack cutting through space and time to hit its opponent while its pilots have visions of events that occurred in the original Aquarion series 12,000 years before.
  - Cluster Mugen Attack (無限芭蕉実拳, Kurasutā Mugen Panchi): A multiplied version of the Mugen Attack performed with multiple Elements boarding each Vector at the same time with Aquarion Evol growing extra fists on its right arm. The attack draws inspiration from bananas, which usually come in clusters.
  - All Together Attack (三位一体拳, San'i Ittai Panchi): Aquarion Evol deploys a Mugen Punch with both hands spiraling together, infused with Zessica's distortion and Kagura's reversal abilities.
- Aquarion Gepard (アクエリオンゲパルト, Akuerion Geparuto): Aquarion Gepard is the result of the combination of the Vectors where Vector X forms the head. It most resembles the original series' Aquarion Omega formation. Gepard is a mainly long-range assault mode, using guns and heavily armed with missiles and also has heavy armor, making it superior for defense. Its primary pilot is Cayenne Suzushiro, capable of the following special attacks:
  - DOGEZA orz (平身低頭覇, Dogeza): Aquarion flies into the sky and surrounds itself in flames before plummeting to the ground, ending up on a prostrating position in an allusion to the Japanese "orz" emoticon. Having little to no practical use in combat, Amata performed this move during a training exercise as an apology to Mikono who was angry with him at the time.
  - Dimension Shutting Cannon (空間断絶砲, Dimenshon Shattingu Kyanon): Assuming a four-legged configuration similar to Genesis of Aquarion's Assault Type Aquarion's Armageddon Formation to perform this attack, incorporating Jin's power of isolation to close the portal between Vega and Altair.
  - Curse of Malloy (脆弱力, Zeijakuryoku): Incorporates Malloy's power of fragility to collapse all structures used as cover by its opponent in battle.
  - Humicane from Rotten Girl (腐食力, Fushokuryoku): Incorporates Sazanka's corroding power to rust metal.
  - Bye-Bye Missiles (倍々増殖誘導弾, Bai-Bai Misairu): Materializes multiple missile launchers to fire a huge barrage at enemies.
  - Contrary Twister (超捻転, Chō Nenten): By combining Zessica's distortion power with Malloy's power of fragility, it unleashes a tornado on the enemy.
  - Tunnel Bullet (次元隧道弾, Tonneru Baretto): Assume the same four-legged configuration used to fire the Dimension Shutting Cannon, this time incorporating Andy's power to create a dimensional portal opening a path from Vega to Altair.
- Aquarion Spada (アクエリオンスパーダ, Akuerion Supāda): Aquarion Spada is the result of the combination of the Vectors where Vector Y forms the head. It most resembles Aquarion Mars from the original Genesis of Aquarion, while also incorporating elements from Aquarion Luna. Spada is a close ranged mode armed with a sword that resembles a fencing épée and uses a part of Vector Y as a makeshift shield. This mode is presumably faster than the other 2 modes. Both shield and sword can be converted into a bow and an arrow respectively for a special ranged attack. Shrade Elan is usually shown to be its primary pilot, relying on his musical proficiency to push Aquarion Spada to its limits and perform super-fast attacks. Spada is the least used of the three combinations as it is the most difficult mode to use, capable of the following special attacks:
  - Moonlight Requiem (月下葬送曲, Mūnraito Rekuiemu): A series of powerful slashes with its sword.
  - No Guard Attack (邪糾拳, Nō Gādo Atakku): An attack with its right fist incorporating the three hand gestures of the rock-paper-scissors game in quick succession.
  - Moonlight Rhapsody (月下狂詩曲, Mūnraito Rapusodi): The combination of Amata, Andy, and Shrade's Element powers, making several spinning cuts while Aquarion Spada flies along.
  - Black Hole Arrow (漆黒虚指弾, Burakku Hōru Arō): Aquarion Spada's sword and shield turns into a bow and arrow, powered up by a nano black hole created by Andy to open a dimensional tear linking Altair and Vega.
  - Cruxifixion Sword (磔刑斬撃剣, Kurushifikushon Sōdo): Aquarion Spada uses its shield to crucify the enemy before powering up its sword and cut it in four with a vertical and a horizontal slash.
  - For My Best Friends (神融奏, Fō Mai Besuto Furenzu): Aquarion Spada transforms its sword into a tuning fork and uses it to stroke the string of the bow before firing it as an arrow to open a path to Altair.
- Aquarion Gepada (アクエリオンゲパーダ, Akuerion Gepāda): A special combination with vectors X and Y sharing the position of the head, created by the combined spirits of Gepard and Spada's main pilots Cayenne and Shrade, branding weaponries from both modes to perform its special attack.
  - Trinity Requiem (奏聖葬送曲, Sōsei no Rekuiemu): Aquarion Gepada powers its two main cannons and its sword to fire a triple energy beam.
- Aquarion Gepardion: A special combination formed by Vector X, Mars and Luna, piloted by Amata, Silvia and Lihua. Exclusive to the Genesis of Aquarion LOVE OVA.
- Aquarion Spadion: A special combination formed by Vectors Y, Z and Sol, piloted by Mikono, Kagura and Apollo. Exclusive to the Genesis of Aquarion LOVE OVA.

==== Aquarias ====
The Aquaria (アクエリア, Akueria) are formations the Vectors made before Amata Sora managed to remove the seal between them, preventing the unification between members of opposite sex. Developed to both fight the Abductors and prevent the same disaster that befell the first time Aquarion Evol was formed, the Aquarias had proven themselves strong against ordinary Abductor forces, but ineffective against commander-type units like the Mithra Gnis. Only two models of Aquaria were created, the Aquaria Type-M piloted only by male Elements, and the female pilots-only Aquaria Type-F, both armed with automatic rifles and a missile pod on each shoulder. The Aquaria are based on the form of Aquarion Gepard, which is said to be the form of Aquarion that requires the least energy to maintain, permitting the formation of it, even with the interference of Guize Stones.

=== Legendary Aquarion ===
Legendary Aquarion (神話型アクエリオン, Shinwagata Akuerion) is the original Solar Aquarion which was buried into the earth's crust to prevent its ruin after the Tree of Life's collapse 12,000 years before. Since then, it replaced the Tree, maintaining the world's balance. When the Legendary Aquarion is unearthed and taken to Altair, the balance is broken and several natural disasters start occurring throughout Vega. It is piloted by Kagura, and its only attack so far is the Genesis Mugen Attack (創聖無限拳, Sōsei Mugen Panchi).

- Ancient Aquarion (エンシェントAQ, Enshento Akuerion): By using the life force of Altair, Mykage transforms it into his own variation, the Ancient AQ in his effort to destroy Vega and Altair, creating another world with him as its god. This variation is several times larger than the normal size, with the usual Aquarion being no larger than the size of this variation's hand.
  - Infinite Palm of the Buddha (神来無限拳): Ancient AQ creates uncountable Mugen Attacks, with the punches reaching the targets before being even deployed, reversing the laws of causality.
- Aquarion Love (アクエリオンLOVE, Akuerion Rabu): Created by Amata and Mikono by infusing Vector Z (transformed into Aquarion EVOL's head part) into the Ancient AQ. Its tears of joy upon their reunion replenishes the supply of water of Vega and Altair, evaporated during Mykage's attempt to destroy both worlds.

=== Altair ===
- Abductors (アブダクター, Abudakutā): The Abductors are Altair's spider-type harvesting mecha. It is equipped with weapons to defend itself.
- Mithra Gnis (ミスラ・グニス, Misura Gunisu): The Mithra Gnis is Kagura Demuri's personal unit that resembles a moth. It wields an axe that is only slightly shorter than the robot's total height. It can fly in Vega's atmosphere and it is also capable of being submerged underwater to prevent detection while it is not in use. It can also run and fight on all fours as a reflection of its user's animalistic behavior.
- Radius Gnis (ラディウス・グニス, Radiusu Gunisu): The Radius Gnis is Jin Muso's personal unit able to fire lasers at an extremely long range with very high precision. It can also deploy hovering glass spheres that reflect his laser guns' shots in any direction, rendering cover useless. It was destroyed by Aquarion Evol which made use of Yunoha's invisibility to phase through its lasers, when it was being remote controlled by Jin. However, he later assembles a stronger version with heavy armor and personally pilots it against Aquarion, but it ends up destroyed too, despite its pilot manages to survive.
- Ahura Gnis (アフラ・グニス, Afura Gunisu): Izumo's personal machine. It makes use of the six plates attached on its back to absorb and return all attacks back to the enemy with increased power. The plates can be arranged to form the "Altair Cannon", firing a powerful blast when infused with the energy of Ianthe.
- Mixy Gnis (ミクシィ・グニス, Mikusi Gunisu): MIXY's personal machine. With powerful U-shaped thrusters and machine gun turrets, it uses MIXY's Element ability to fill up holes on enemy armor in a fashion similar to the Absolute Clam attack performed by MIX while piloting Aquarion Evol.
- Cherubim Verazeva (ケルビム・ヴェルルゼバ, Kerubimu Veruruzeba): A non-manned mecha deployed by Mykage. It is the same cherubim used by Toma in the events of last episode in Genesis of Aquarion 12,000 years before.
