= Izetta: The Last Witch =

Japanese anime television series

- Promotional art for the anime featuring, left to right, Arnold Berkmann, Izetta, and Finé

終末のイゼッタ (Shūmatsu no Izetta)
- Genre: Historical fantasy; Military
- Anime television series
- Directed by: Masaya Fujimori
- Produced by: Tatsuya Yamaguchi; Shin'ichiro Ozawa
- Written by: Hiroyuki Yoshino
- Music by: Michiru
- Studio: Ajiado
- Licensed by: Crunchyroll
- Original network: AT-X, Tokyo MX, Sun TV, BS11
- Original run: October 1, 2016 – December 17, 2016
- Episodes: 12

Izetta: The Last Witch (終末のイゼッタ, Shūmatsu no Izetta; lit. Izetta of the End, also transcribed in German as Izetta, Die Letzte Hexe) is a 2016 Japanese fantasy anime television series. The project was announced through the opening of an official website and a video on June 10, 2016. The series, produced by Ajiado and directed by Masaya Fujimori, aired from October 1 to December 17, 2016.

== Plot ==
Set in an alternate Earth on the eve of the Second World War, the story follows Izetta, the last surviving member of a clan of witches that possesses the ability to magically manipulate any object that they touch. Izetta pledges to help protect Princess Finé and the tiny Alpine country of Eylstadt from invasion by the imperialistic forces of Germania.

== Characters ==
=== Main characters ===
Izetta (イゼッタ, Izetta)
Voiced by: Himika Akaneya (Japanese); Skyler McIntosh (English)
Izetta, age 15, is the titular main character who met Princess Finé when they were children, and the last known descendant of the Weisse Hexe of Eylstadt (see below). Prior to the beginning of the series, she attempted to keep her witch heritage a secret by traveling around different countries with her grandmother, which made her shy and self-conscious. With the outbreak of the war she devotes herself to Finé's and Eylstadt's protection, thus breaking her taboo not to use her powers to intervene with mankind's fate. Izetta's magical powers include animating and enhancing objects into tank-busting weapons. They are, however, hugely dependent on the presence of ley lines, which, depending on her current location, limits the frequency at which she can employ them. She is usually seen riding a modified Boys anti-tank rifle in place of a broom, although she can use any rod-shaped object, such as medieval cavalry lances, in a pinch. In the first few episodes of the series, she is seen riding a modified PTRS-41 anti tank rifle.
Ortfiné "Finé" Fredericka von Eylstadt (オルトフィーネ・"フィーネ"・フリーレリカ・フォン・エイルシュタット, Orutofīne "Fīne" Furederika fon Eirushutatto)
Voiced by: Saori Hayami (Japanese); Mallorie Rodak (English)
Finé is the crown Princess of Eylstadt and only heir to the throne. Tomboyish, kind, and strong-willed, she is most beloved by her people and is forced to take command of her country's defense when her father dies from illness shortly after the beginning of the Germanian invasion of Eylstadt. Finé and Izetta met in their childhood, but instead of being afraid, Finé came to admire Izetta's magical powers and became her closest friend, once even shielding her against a peasant mob who accused Izetta of setting a shed on fire. Because of her affection for her, and the role her ancestor played in the death of the original Weisse Hexe (see below), she is reluctant to send Izetta into battle, fearing for her safety.

=== Eylstadt ===
Eylstadt is a small, alpine duchy whose capital is Landsbruck. The country's location is based on what is western Austria today consisting of the states Tyrol and Vorarlberg, and its capital based on Innsbruck. The motto of its national flag reads "Ich bin tapfer und bin fromm" (literal translation: "I am valiant and am pious"). Their military equipment is patterned largely after the French Army's from the time between World War I and II. Germania intends to conquer Eylstadt simply to open a shorter road to their ally, the Romulus Federation, enabling a joint invasion of the Mediterranean and Africa.

Rudolf (ルドルフ, Rudorufu)
Voiced by: Toshiyuki Morikawa (Japanese); Philip Weber (English)
The Archduke of Eylstadt who dies from illness soon after the Germanian invasion begins, forcing his daughter to assume the throne in his place.
Sieghard Müller (ジークハート・ミューラ, Jīkuhāto Mūra)
Voiced by: Hiroki Takahashi (Japanese); Christopher Wehkamp (English)
Sieghart "Sieg" Müller is a counselor at the Duchal Palace, and a member of a family which has served the Duchal Family for generations. He is in charge of the principality's intelligence and counter-intelligence operations. When Jonas discovers the secret about Izetta's limits in her powers, he kills him in the name of "raison d'etat", but is haunted by his deed. For that reason, Müller loses his life in the final episode to a young Germanian soldier he has mistaken for Jonas.
Bianca (ビアンカ, Bianka)
Voiced by: Aya Uchida (Japanese); Madeleine Morris (English)
Bianca is leader of Eylstadt's Royal Guard and Princess Finé's bodyguard. Initially distrustful of Izetta, she comes to care for her as much as for Finé once convinced of Izetta's sincerity.
Lotte (ロッテ, Rotte)
Voiced by: Nao Tōyama (Japanese); Jill Harris (English)
Lotte is an energetic, happy-to-go maid in the Duchal Palace and ordered by Princess Finé to be of service to Izetta. While on chamber duties in the palace, she carries a footstool strapped to her back in order to ease her work with taller persons. Her family owns an inn in Eylstadt's old capital, where the castle of the Weisse Hexe is located.
Elvira Friedmann (エルヴィラ・フリードマン, Eruvuira Furīdoman)
Voiced by: Kana Hanazawa (Japanese); Tia Ballard (English)
Elvira is Princess Finé's personal tutor and a former reporter for several newspapers and radio stations in the United States of Atlanta. Upon Müller's suggestion, she is hired by the Princess to become Izetta's public advertiser in order to improve Eylstadt's morale.
General Schneider (シュナイダー, Shunaīda)
Voiced by: Kōzō Shioya (Japanese); Jeremy Schwartz (English)
The supreme commander of Eylstadt's military forces.
Warmer (ヴァルマー, Vuarumā)
Voiced by: Ryunosuke Watanuki (Japanese); Ben Phillips (English)
Finé's prime minister and one of her chief councillors.
Hans Obermayer (ハンス・オベルマヤ, Hansu Oberumaia)
Voiced by: Kenn (Japanese); Haulston Mann (English)
Hans is the leader of Eylstadt's Schweizen Fortress garrison. After the fortress' fall in the beginning stage of the Germanian invasion, and his subsequent assistance to Finé and Izetta during their escape from Berkman's henchmen, he has become a trusted member of Finé's inner circle.
Koontz (シュナイーダ, Kōntsu)
Voiced by: Shinya Takahashi (Japanese); Chris Ryan (English)
A spy for hire who is often employed by Müller for any shadow operations in the service of the Archduchal family.
Jonas Gallea (ヨナス・ガレラ, Ionasu Garera)
Voiced by: Hiroyuki Endo (Japanese); Jean-Luc Hester (English)
A young spectacled soldier recently enlisted into Eylstadt's army, who is part of a large family with a younger brother and two sisters. After inadvertently overhearing a conversation about Izetta's weakness, he is critically wounded by the Germanian spy Lorenz to make him talk, and later killed by Müller to keep the information secret.
Tobias (トビアス, Tobiasu)
Voiced by: Junji Majima (Japanese); Kyle Phillips (English)
Tobias was one of Princess Finé's bodyguards who accompanied her to Westria. He is shot and killed by Berkman as he tries to help Princess Finé escape from a train.
Hermann (ヘルマン, Heruman)
Voiced by: Ryōtarō Okiayu (Japanese); Ben Bryant (English)
One of Princess Finé's bodyguards who accompanied her to Westria. He is shot by Germanian secret commandos during Finé's capture in the first episode.
Weisse Hexe (ヴァイス ヘクセ or 白き 魔女, Vaisu Hekuse or Shiroki Majo)
The Weisse Hexe (German for "white witch") is Eylstadt's legendary protector in a past age. She and a Prince of Eylstadt met and fell in love; but briefly before dying, the Prince, fearing that the story of the witch could reach the Church and put his kingdom in danger of being accused of heresy, with his last breath ordered to sell her out to the Inquisition and send her to the stake. However, using a cell sample recovered from her remains, the Germanian Weapons Design Division 9 cloned her to become Germania's own magical weapon of conquest. (See Sophie, below, for details.)

=== Germania ===
Germania is a powerful military country based on Nazi Germany, although it is portrayed as a monarchical empire similar to the pre-war German Empire. Its capital bears the name Neu-Berlin, and its appearance is patterned after Albert Speer's designs for Hitler's new "World Capital Germania". Its military standard is a diagonally shifted Balkenkreuz with a short dagger blade replacing one of its arms. The vast majority of its armor and equipment are identical to the pre- and early-WWII Wehrmacht, including the Panzer III, Panzer IV, Heinkel He 111, Messerschmitt Bf 109, Junkers Ju 87, Karabiner 98k rifles, MP40 submachine guns, etc. Its victory parole is "Sieg Reich" (derived from real Nazi Germany's "Sieg Heil"), but it is not entirely clear whether it's supposed to mean "Sieg [für das] Reich"/"Sieg [dem] Reich" (both "Victory [for the] Reich") or "siegreich" ("victorious").

Arnold Berkmann (アーノルド ベルクマン, Ānorudo Berukuman)
Voiced by: Junichi Suwabe (Japanese); John Burgmeier (English)
Terribly cunning and a superb analyst, Berkmann is a Major (later promoted to Lieutenant Colonel) of the Germanian Special Unit. While he appears to serve his country faithfully on the surface, he is actually a cynical survivalist who shifts his loyalties as the wind of fate blows. After he is dismissed from the Germanian Witch project by Otto and thus outlived his usefulness to the Emperor, he readily sells out his knowledge to the Eylstadtians. After the end of the war, he is last seen selling himself and the secrets of Design Division 9 to the United States of Atlanta.
Sophie (ゾフィー, Zofī)
Voiced by: Sora Amamiya (Japanese); Jad Saxton (English)
A clone of the original Weisse Hexe created by the Germanian Weapons Design Division 9. Born without a mind of her own, Sophie depended on Izetta's blood to awaken her consciousness. Embittered by the treason she suffered under the ancient Eylstadtians, she has become the Emperor's willing tool in their quest for world domination in exchange for being allowed to destroy all of Eylstadt personally. She uses one half of a magic stone which drains and concentrates magic from the land, but at the cost of draining its wielder of their lifeforce, as her primary weapon. She dies when Izetta concentrates all the world's magic power into one gigantic power blast, tempting her to attempt the same, thereby over-exerting herself and rendering her too weak to survive.
Rickert Bisterfelt (リッケルト ビスタフェルト, Rikkeruto Bisutaferuto)
Voiced by: Natsuki Hanae (Japanese); Derick Snow (English)
A Second Lieutenant in Berkmann's Special Unit, Rickert is his right-hand man and the young heir to a noble family who has decided to make his own way in the world. With the help of Germanian spy Lorenz, he infiltrates Eylstadt's old capital castle to uncover the secret room of the Weisse Hexe, but is killed by Bianca after they are found out.
Otto (オットー, Ottō)
Voiced by: Kōichi Yamadera (Japanese); Brandon Potter (English)
The whimsical and megalomanic ruler of Germania, loosely based on both Adolf Hitler and Wilhelm II. Unlike most of his peers, he believes that witches exist since the actual existence of the Weisse Hexe was substantiated, and he intends to use their power in his bid for world conquest. He commits suicide in his bunker under the Imperial Palace in late 1941, briefly before Neu-Berlin's fall against the Allies.
Elliot (エリオット, Eriotto)
Voiced by: Daisuke Hirakawa (Japanese); Dave Trosko (English)
Elliot is the Emperor's often-ignored prime counselor.
Basler (バスラー, Basurā)
Voiced by: Yoshimasa Hosoya (Japanese); Jeffrey Schmidt (English)
A Germanian air force captain and ace pilot whose squadron was wiped out by Izetta during her first rescue of Finé, and who seeks to settle the score with her to erase the blot on his pride. He leads a Germanian task force to intercept Finé before she can reach a Germanian-led surrender conference, but is unable to prevent Berkmann, whom he accuses a traitor, from defecting. Loyal to his country to the end, he departs with his plane in the final days of the war to a probable last suicide mission.
Elisabeth (エリザベート, Erisabēto)
Voiced by: Kikuko Inoue (Japanese); Leah Clark (English)
A high-ranking female Germanian officer and head of the Imperial Technology Arsenal's Design Division 9.
Lorenz (ローレンツ, Rōrentsu)
Voiced by: Shuusaku Shirakawa (Japanese); Alejandro Saab (English)
A Germanian captain and spy who has infiltrated Eylstadt's army and becomes aware of Jonas discovering Izetta's weakness. He is later killed by the Royal Guard after he and Rickert infiltrate a castle which contains the secrets of the Weisse Hexe. (Note: In English translations, his name is spelled in its anglicized form Laurence.)
Görtz (ゲルツ, Gerutsu)
Voiced by: Kōji Yusa (Japanese); Michael Johnson (English)
Officer and leader of a Germanian task force assigned to bring Finé and Izetta to Neu-Berlin at the beginning of the series. He is killed when Izetta awakens from her suspended animation and her magic rips the plane they are travelling on in half.
Thomas (トーマス, Tōmasu)
Voiced by: Shinya Takahashi (Japanese); Orion Pitts (English)
He is interested in witches and he appears to be suspicious of Izetta.

=== Others ===
Lord Redford (レッドフォード, Reddofōdo)
Voiced by: Mitsuaki Hoshino (Japanese); Cole Brown (ep. 1–6), David Wald (ep. 7 onwards) (English)
The Britannian Foreign Secretary who is sympathetic to Eylstadt's cause.
Izetta's Grandmother (イゼッタの祖母, Izetta no sobo)
Voiced by: Fumi Hirano
Izetta's grandmother and tutor in the magic arts. She died at an unspecified time before the series' beginning, but appears several times in flashbacks whenever Izetta remembers her lessons.

== Speculation ==
The Eylstadt family appears to be based on the real-world Imperial House of Habsburg which ruled the Holy Roman Empire for centuries and, after the Dissolution of the Holy Roman Empire, the Austrian Empire, this claim being supported by the fact that the rulers or Eylstadt style themselves Archduke, the fact that the Duchy of Eylstadt is located in the West-most part of Austria, right across the border from the ancestral lands of the Habsburgs in today's Switzerland, support this theory, as does the fact that the title "Archduke" is closely associated with the House of Habsburg. Finally, the national anthem of Eylstadt shares its tune with the National anthem of Austria.

== Media ==
=== Anime ===
The series, produced by Ajia-do Animation Works, aired in Japan from October 1 to December 17, 2016. The series was simulcast by Crunchyroll, with Funimation streamed an English dub from October 19, 2016. The opening theme is "Cross the Line" by Akino with bless4, while the ending theme is "Hikaru Aru Basho e" (光ある場所へ, To a Place With Light) by May'n.

==== Episodes ====
No.	Title (Note: All English titles are taken from Funimation.)	Original release date
1	"Beginning of the War"; Transliteration: "Tatakai no Hajimari." (Japanese: たたかいのはじまり (Der Anfang der Schlacht))	October 1, 2016
In the neutral country of Westria during a time of war, Ortfiné "Finé" Fredericka von Eylstadt, the princess of the small country of Eylstadt, is being pursued by Germanian soldiers on a train. While hiding in one of the carriages, Finé finds a mysterious capsule, opening a few of the locks before she and her escorts are forced to jump from the train. Later, Finé meets up with Britannian Lord Redford to try gain his country's support against the impending Germanian invasion on her homeland. Unfortunately they receive news that Germanian forces have already begun invading Eylstadt, and Finé is captured by Germanian soldiers. While she is escorted by plane towards the capital, Neu-Berlin, the capsule from earlier opens up, revealing a witch named Izetta, whom Finé remembers from her childhood. Using her abilities, Izetta destroys the plane, before finding an anti-tank rifle among the debris. Riding it, she flies over to catch Finé, before flying both of them to safety.
2	"Scars and Gunfire"; Transliteration: "Kizuato to, Jūsei to" (Japanese: 傷跡と、銃声と (Mit Narben und Schüssen))	October 8, 2016
Izetta tries to get Finé to safety to treat injuries she received during the struggle on the plane, and she is forced to use some of her magic to destroy some pursuing Germanian fighter planes. After Izetta runs low on magic, Finé uses the rifle they are riding to drive off the remaining plane before they both fall into the forest below. They continue on foot, where they come across a group of Eylstadtian soldiers who lost Fort Schweizen to the Germanians. While the medic treats Finé's injuries, Izetta recalls how she first met Finé, who befriended her despite knowing she was a witch; the last of her kind. Recalling how Finé once saved her life, Izetta declines Finé's request to flee to safety and instead offers to help protect her country.
3	"The Sword in the Heavens"; Transliteration: "Amakakeru Tsurugi" (Japanese: 天翔ける剣 (Das Schwert des Himmels))	October 15, 2016
On the front lines of Coenenberg, the Eylstadtian army, including a young soldier named Jonas, are almost helpless against the oncoming Germanian forces as they attack with bomber planes and a platoon of tanks. The soldiers at the castle request to join the fight, but Finé stops them after learning that the Coenenberg garrison soldiers are putting their lives on the line simply to buy time for civilians to evacuate. Just as another squadron of Germanian planes prepares to attack, Izetta arrives on the scene, using her magic on lances and swords to stop the enemy planes and tanks. Seeing Izetta's determination to protect her country, Finé encourages the other soldiers in Coenenberg to support her, leading them to victory against the Germanian forces. The Eylstadtian army celebrate the return of the White Witch and sings a rousing rendition of their national anthem. Later Finé's father, the archduke, who is bedridden, is informed about Finé's safety and Izetta's deeds just before he passes away.
4	"The Secret of the Witch"; Transliteration: "Majo no Himitsu" (Japanese: 魔女の秘密 (Das Geheimnis der Hexe))	October 22, 2016
Finé goes to Eylstadt's capital, Landsbruck, to mourn the death of her father. Meanwhile General Grosskopf reports to the Germanian Emperor, Otto, about their defeat at Coenenberg at the hands of Izetta. In the morning Izetta awakes in the Archduke's castle, under the care of maid Lotte and Finé's skeptical bodyguard Lady Bianca. Finé calls Izetta before her cabinet to explain why she cannot use magic at any time. Izetta reveals that a witch's power is drawn from ley lines beneath the earth, not in places such as Landsbruck with few or no ley lines. The cabinet decide to keep this secret confidential, telling only reporter Elvira Friedman who is hired to publicly promote Izetta as the legendary Eylstadt White Witch during Finé's upcoming coronation. Izetta recalls her grandmother telling her that a secret of the witches lies under a nearby abandoned castle. Bianca takes Izetta to investigate, managing to find a ley line map in a hidden room. During their return, Izetta explains to Bianca how Finé saved her from superstitious villagers and they agree to become comrades. On the day of the coronation, Izetta encourages Finé to work towards bringing peace to not only Eylstadt, but the entire world.
5	"A False Miracle"; Transliteration: "Itsuwari no Kiseki" (Japanese: 偽りの奇跡 (Das falsche Wunder))	October 29, 2016
During Finé's coronation as Archduchess at the White Witch's castle, Izetta and her powers are presented to the world. Izetta then launches retaliatory strikes against the Germanian occupation forces as part of a calculated gamble to cower Germania from making any further invasion attempts. Berkmann, having advised the Emperor to let him analyse the situation, interviews Air Force Captain Basler about his experience with Izetta's powers and concludes that the witch must have her limits. When the Germanians launch an assault through a mountain pass not covered by the ley lines, Finé and Müller set a plan in motion to cover up this critical weakness. Izetta warns the Germainan forces against proceeding, and using Bianca's Royal Guard as hidden snipers and planted explosives to simulate Izetta's magic, the attack is repelled and the enemy force abandon their advance. Soon afterwards while trying to retrieve his family photo from a brook, young soldier Jonas accidentally overhears a conversation between Müller and General Schneider about the ruse. Jonas is discovered and barely manages to get away, but Müller finds the photograph floating in the water.
6	"On a Quiet Day..."; Transliteration: "Odayakana hi ni" (Japanese: 穏やかな日に (An einem ruhigen Tag...))	November 5, 2016
In Germania, Berkmann begins preparing the first stages of his plan to counter Izetta by consulting the head of the Imperial Technology Arsenal's Design Division 9 for its top secret weapon developments. On the first peaceful day since the beginning of the invasion, Finé, Izetta, Bianca and Lotte try their best to enjoy this rare quiet time and the few everyday luxuries left to them, even by sneaking into a café Finé has "secretly" visited in the past to indulge on its famous cherry pie (only to discover to her embarrassment that the café owners and the palace guard have known about this pastime all along!). Afterwards, Müller asks Finé for her permission to leave the country and attend a conference held by the governments allied against Germania, in order to spur them into another foray into Germanian territory. Finé decides to attend the conference personally, along with Izetta, and the two girls depart for Britannia. In the meantime, Jonas confides his knowledge about Izetta's weakness to a sergeant in his platoon, who is secretly Captain Lorenz, a Germanian spy. When Lorenz attempts to force Jonas to talk, he is chased off by Müller and Koontz, and Jonas is shot by Müller to keep the vital information secret.
7	"The Battle of Sognefjord"; Transliteration: "Sogunefyordo kaise" (Japanese: ソグネフィヨルド海戦 (Die Seeschlacht im Sognefjord))	November 12, 2016
After Finé and Izetta arrive in Britannia, they try to enlist the Allies' aid for Eylstadt by offering them a demonstration of Izetta's power. A new but still uncompleted Germanian aircraft carrier, the Drachenfels, has gone into hiding at Sognefjord in the country of Nord, and Finé proposes that Izetta should sink the ship before it becomes fully operational. However, thanks to the Germanian spy network, Berkmann has become aware of the plan and prepared an ambush for Izetta, using the ship as bait. The fact that ley lines and non-magical areas intersect within the fjord hampers Izetta's freedom of movement; while she takes out the carrier, her occasional lack of control over her powers during the battle confirms Berkmann's suspicions about her possible weakness. Certain that the secret to this lies within the old capital's castle of the White Witch, he proposes to send in his own spy to investigate, but to his surprise Rickert volunteers himself for this mission.
8	"A Cruel Fairy Tale"; Transliteration: "Zankokuna otogibanashi" (Japanese: 残酷なおとぎ話 (Das grausame Märchen))	November 19, 2016
Rickert lands in Eylstadt and makes his way to the Weisse Hexe's castle to rendezvous with Lorenz, who is still hunted by Müller and the Royal Guard. Rickert and Lorenz penetrate the secret chamber using a blood sample taken from Izetta during her earlier captivity. They photograph the ley line map, but the blood also releases a strange red stone from a hidden niche. They are both caught and eliminated by the Royal Guard, but another Germanian spy recovers their findings. Meanwhile, at a masked ball in Lord Redford's castle, Finé and Izetta encounter Berkmann and a strange girl, who suddenly bites Izetta on the lips and drains a small portion of her blood before they slip away. Afterwards, Stanley, the Atlantan Foreign Secretary, informs the two girls that due to Izetta's achievement at Sognefjord, he will recommend to his President that troops be sent to the European theatre. However, he also secretly proposes to his President to invade Eylstadt as well in order to eliminate the potential threat he sees in Izetta.
9	"The Sellun Corridor Burns"; Transliteration: "Zerun kairō moe" (Japanese: ゼルン回廊、燃ゆ (Der Sellun-Korridor brennt nieder))	November 26, 2016
Three months following Izetta and Finé's return from Britannia, things have remained calm in Eylstadt, although the young witch and the Archduchess continue to assist the anti-Germanian forces in Europe as best they can while the Allies prepare to move in from the north. Soon the Germanians attempt another advance into the principality, but employing a feint, they lure Izetta to the western border at Coenenberg while commencing their actual attack at Sellun, the eastern line of defense. Izetta is rushed to the battlefield, but there she encounters a formidable adversary: Sophie, a young witch in the service of the Germanians and a clone of the original Weisse Hexe. When Sophie fails to dissuade Izetta from pursuing her current course, she uses the magic stone stolen from the Weisse Hexe's secret chamber to neutralize Izetta's connection to the ley lines. With its greatest asset defeated and captured by the enemy, Eylstadt is left helpless before the Germanian strikes, and its capital, Landsbruck falls in a matter of hours.
10	"The Iron Hammer of the Witch"; Transliteration: "Majo no tettsui" (Japanese: 魔女の鉄槌 (Der eiserne Hammer der Hexe))	December 3, 2016
As Landsbruck falls to the Germanians and Sophie takes out any remaining nests of organized military resistance, the high-ranking Eylstadtian officials, including Finé, escape through a tunnel. In Germania, Sophie and Berkmann are congratulated by Otto for their efforts, but Berkmann is shunted out of the Design Division. The Emperor, with the odds now greatly in his favor, now sets out to conquer the rest of the world. Meanwhile at Sellun, where Izetta has been taken captive, Eylstadtian troops and the Royal Guard execute an ambush and successfully retrieve Izetta. A month later, Izetta awakens in an underground hideout which is now being used as Eylstadt's capital, where Finé and Müller reveal to her that their ancestors were directly involved in the Weisse Hexe legend: The prince's wife was Finé's ancestor, and Müller's family worked with Finé's family to sell out the Witch. When Izetta continues to show her determination to fight for Finé's sake, despite Finè's deep regrets and the grievous injuries Sophie has inflicted on her, Müller surprisingly presents her with the other half of Sophie's magic stone.
11	"Finé"; Transliteration: "Fīne" (Japanese: フィーネ (Finé))	December 10, 2016
Sieghard Müller delivers the other half of the Weisse Hexe's magic stone to Izetta which he has kept hidden since the death of the White Witch. Although dismissed from the Witch Project by Emperor Otto, Berkmann and the Germanians pay a visit to the Weisse Hexe's shrine in the old royal castle and Rickert's grave. The Germanians find where Archduchess Finé is hiding and Germanian SS troops invade the secret bunker where their cruel commander forces Finé to surrender. Suddenly Izetta employs the magic stone to drive the attackers off, despite the danger the artefact poses to her. After ascertaining that Otto had him marked for elimination, Berkmann kills the commander and surrenders to the Eylstadtians. He then gives them highly confidential information about Emperor Otto's new secret missile weapon, which, empowered and controlled by Sophie's magic, is soon to be unleashed on Landsbruck as an example to force the world's nations to surrender. In order to stop Otto's plan, Finé travels to the Germanian led conference in Westria while Izetta leaves to engage Sophie in a fight to prevent the weapon's launch; but both find Sophie and the Germanians are prepared for them.
12	"Izetta"; Transliteration: "Izetta" (Japanese: イゼッタ (Izetta))	December 17, 2016
Izetta and Sophie engage in an all-out duel of magic as the missile is prepared for launch. Meanwhile Müller and Bianca try their best to get Archduchess Finé to the conference while Berkmann initiates a discreet getaway. Müller sacrifices his life while creating a diversion, allowing Finé and Bianca to reach the dignitaries and forestall their nations' unconditional surrender to Germania. Izetta draws Sophie away from the missile base to prevent the launch, but in frustration the Germanians activate another of Sophie's clones in an attempt to launch the missile anyway. Izetta drains away all the magic from around the world, stopping the missile, defeating Sophie and foiling Otto's dreams of world conquest, and at the same time ending all magic on Earth and her life as a witch. The war eventually comes to an end when the Allies under Atlanta's leadership invade Europe and Otto commits suicide. The series ends with Finé continuing her work towards world peace and regularly visiting Izetta, who has survived the final ordeal, in her new cottage erected on the same spot where she and Finé first met as children.
