= Kimi no Shinwa ~ Aquarion Dai 2 Shou =

- The single's cover, which features Aquarion Evol protagonist Amata Sora

Single by AKINO with bless4
- A-side: "Kimi no Shinwa ~ Aquarion Dai 2 Shou"
- B-side: "Gekkō Symphonia" by AKINO & AIKI of bless4
- Released: February 15, 2012
- Recorded: 2011
- Genre: J-Pop, anison
- Length: 5:32
- Label: Flying DOG
- Songwriters: Gabriela Robin, Yoko Kanno

AKINO singles chronology
| "Go Tight!" (2005) | "Kimi no Shinwa ~ Aquarion Dai 2 Shou" (2012) |

"Kimi no Shinwa ~ Aquarion Dai 2 Shou" (君の神話 ～アクエリオン第二章, Kimi no Shinwa ~ Akuerion Dai Ni Shō; literally "Your Legend, Aquarion Chapter 2") is the third single by American-born Japanese recording artist AKINO. It is the first single that also features her brothers Akashi and Aiki and sister Kanasa, backing her up as their band bless4. It is used as the opening theme of the anime Aquarion Evol, the sequel to Genesis of Aquarion for which AKINO also performed the theme songs. On her blog, AKINO described the song as having gospel stylings. The single's B-side "Gekkō Symphonia" (月光シンフォニア, Gekkō Shinfonia; lit. 'Moonlight Symphonia') serves as Evol's ending theme and is a duet between AKINO and her younger brother AIKI. AKINO described it as a love song, but she stated that it was embarrassing to do this as the first duet with her brother. Both songs were written by Gabriela Robin and composed and arranged by Yoko Kanno.

"Kimi no Shinwa" peaked on the Oricon's weekly single charts at number 3, remaining on the charts for 3 weeks. It also charted at 13 on the Oricon's monthly charts in February 2012, peaked at number 8 on the Billboard Japan Hot 100, number 3 on Billboard Japan's Hot Singles Sales chart, and number 2 on Billboard Japan's Hot Animation chart. AKINO also noted that the song and its B-side filled the top two spots of the iTunes Store's anime theme song rankings.

== Track listing ==
1. "Kimi no Shinwa ~ Aquarion Dai 2 Shou" – 5:32
2. "Gekkō Symphonia" – 3:55
3. "Kimi no Shinwa ~ Aquarion Dai 2 Shou" (Instrumental) – 5:32
4. "Gekkō Symphonia" (Instrumental) – 3:51
