= Go Tight! =

Single by Akino

from the album Lost in Time
- B-side: "Omna Magni" by Yui Makino; "Esperança!" by Ole! Aquarion
- Released: August 24, 2005
- Recorded: 2005
- Genre: J-pop
- Length: 13:34
- Label: Victor Entertainment
- Composer: Yoko Kanno
- Lyricist: Yuho Iwasato
- Producer: Yoko Kanno

Akino singles chronology
| "Genesis of Aquarion" (2005) | "Go Tight!" (2005) | "Kimi no Shinwa ~ Aquarion Dai 2 Shou" (2012) |

"Go Tight!" is the second single from Akino, produced and composed by Yoko Kanno. The title track is used as the second opening theme of the anime Genesis of Aquarion and an insert song of the sequel Aquarion Evol. "Go Tight!" peaked at #18 on the Oricon Weekly Charts and charted for seven weeks. Gabriela Robin is credited as the lyricist for "Omna Magni" and "Esperança!". A version of the title track as sung by some of the cast members of the series is featured as a B-side on the digital re-release of "Genesis of Aquarion".

== Track list ==
1. "Go Tight!" – 4:44
2. "Omna Magni" (オムナ マグニ, Omuna Maguni) – 1:38
  - Yui Makino
3. "Esperança!" (エスペランサ!, Esuperansa!) – 2:32
  - Ole! Aquarion (オーレ！アクエリオン, Ōre! Akuerion)
4. "Go Tight! (Instrumental)" – 4:41
