= The Inside Man (2019 TV series) =

Cybersecurity awareness training web series

- Genre: Drama; Corporate Training
- Written by: Robert McCollum
- Directed by: Jim Shields
- Starring: Benjamin Adnams; Abe Jarman; Kathryn Georghiou; Brandon Potter
- Composer: Michael Tedstone
- Country of origin: United Kingdom
- Original language: English
- No. of series: 7
- No. of episodes: 84

Production
- Executive producers: Stu Sjouwerman; John Just; Perry Carpenter
- Producers: James Hissett; Micaiah Dring; Dan Gibling; Poppy Van Praagh; Sean Deller
- Cinematography: Stephen Trinder
- Editor: Richard Leverton
- Running time: 5–7 minutes
- Production companies: Twist and Shout Communications

Original release
- Network: KnowBe4
- Release: 19 March 2019 – 14 November 2024

The Inside Man is a 2019 British cybersecurity awareness training web series created for KnowBe4. Designed as a corporate training tool, The Inside Man highlights real-world cybersecurity risks such as social engineering, phishing, and insider threats. The show has received industry recognition for its engaging approach to security awareness and has won multiple awards.

== Premise ==
Mark Shepherd is a reformed hacker who is hired as an IT security analyst at Khromacom. As he becomes more involved with his colleagues, he faces moral dilemmas that challenge his loyalties.

=== Cast and characters ===
- Benjamin Adnams as Mark Shepherd
- Abe Jarman as AJ
- Kathryn Georghiou as Fiona Hudson
- Brandon Potter as Maurice
- Kirsty Averton as Violet
- Rosalind Burt as Charlotte
- Daniel Hall as Graham
- Katie Pattinson as Erica
- Robert McCollum as Agent Murphy
- Dorthea Darby as Astra
- Phil Chadwick as The Operative
- Laura Murray as Dawn
- Lily McCollum as Deathrage
- Nick Raggett as George
- George Wakely as Martin Chase
- Selina Youngerman as Agent Castillon
- David Tarpey as Cyrus
- Kat Kitchener as Marsha
- Sean Deller as Himself

== Episodes ==
Season	Episodes	Originally released	
Season	Episodes	First released	Last released
1	12	March 19, 2019	
2	12	February 14, 2020	February 15, 2020
3	12	February 9, 2021	
4	12	February 15, 2022	
5	12	March 23, 2023	August 1, 2023
6	12	November 14, 2024	

== Reception ==
=== Awards ===
The Inside Man has received multiple awards recognizing its excellence in cybersecurity awareness training.

- Cannes Corporate Media & TV Awards
  - Gold Dolphin (webisodes) (2021, 2022)
  - Silver Dolphin (webisodes) (2019, 2020, 2023)
- NYX Awards
  - Non-Broadcast - E-Learning (2020, 2021)

== See also ==
- Corporate espionage
- Internet Security Awareness Training
- Security awareness
- Social engineering
