= Aquarion Logos =

Anime television series

- Cover of the first Blu-ray volume, which features the female protagonist Maia Tsukigane

アクエリオンロゴス (Akuerion Rogosu)
- Genre: Action, science fiction
- Created by: Shōji Kawamori; Satelight
- Prequels
- Genesis of Aquarion (2005); Aquarion Evol (2012)
- Anime television series
- Directed by: Hidezaku Satō; Assistant director: Daisuke Chikushi
- Produced by: Masao Itō; Shingo Yokota; Masatoshi Ishizuka; Hirokazu Hara; Shintarō Yoshitake; Yoshiyuki Shioya; Kazunori Goka; Chūya Ishida; Yukinobu Yatabe; Atsushi Nakahashi; Seira Takano
- Written by: Jun Kumagai
- Music by: R.O.N
- Studio: Satelight; C2C
- Licensed by: Crunchyroll
- Original network: Tokyo MX; Sun TV; TV Aichi; KBS; GYT; GTV; BS11; AT-X
- Original run: July 2, 2015 – December 24, 2015
- Episodes: 26
- Sequel
- Aquarion: Myth of Emotions (2025)

Aquarion Logos (アクエリオンロゴス, Akuerion Rogosu) is an anime series produced by Satelight, and the third in the Aquarion franchise, after Genesis of Aquarion and Aquarion Evol, celebrating its 10th anniversary. The series is directed by Eiichi Sato, with character designs by Takeshi Mamezuka. The series' opening theme was composed by Yoko Kanno and performed by May'n. The series began airing in July 2015. In North America, Funimation simulcasted the anime as it aired in Japan. The series was added to the Crunchyroll catalog on June 15, 2017. This series follows an entirely new storyline, unrelated to the previous entries in the franchise.

== Plot ==
Twelve thousand years ago, human voices had defined the true nature of all things, yet the invention of text changed the status quo which created a "Logos World" between the realities of voice and the truth. Up until the modern day, advancements of civilizations have made the Logos World too big to control texts down to their very concept. Seeking to upset this fragile balance is a mogul and sorcerer named Sōgon Kenzaki, who creates monsters called the MJBK (Menace of Japanese with Biological Kinetic energy) who threaten the modern society.

To counter the MJBK, a group of young people blessed with the power of "Verbalism" is assembled by the organization DEAVA (Division of EArth Verbalism Ability) to pilot the vector machines, which are used to form the mechas dubbed "Aquarions", and among them, a boy and self-proclaimed savior named Akira Kaibuki living in Asagaya.

== Characters ==
=== Verbalism Club ===
Akira Kaibuki (灰吹 陽, Kaibuki Akira)
Voiced by: Nobunaga Shimazaki (Japanese); Todd Haberkorn (English)
The main protagonist, Akira is a stoic and level-headed youngster who behaves according to his belief that he is bent into become a "savior", although not even he remembers why or when he started doing so. He is the grandson of a famous calligrapher and pilots the all-around, red-colored Vector-01, which he nicknames as "Savior-go". After his vector is destroyed, he obtains another ancient vector known as Vector-ga, far increasing his powers.
Maia Tsukigane (月銀 舞亜, Tsukigane Maia)
Voiced by: Ayane Sakura (Japanese); Luci Christian (English)
Trained since childhood to be Subete's partner, she grew up blindly following Sōgon's teachings until her first sortie when she is forced to combine with Akira and defeat the M.J.B.K. she was supposed to protect. After being held prisoner by DEAVA, she obtains a chance to return to NESTA, but Sōgon instead instructs her to pretend that she switched sides in order to investigate Akira further. However, she eventually learns to think by herself and joins forces with Akira and the others against Sōgon to defeat him instead. She pilots the purple-colored Vector-02, focused on air superiority.
She is a human created from Verbalism Power with the purpose of awakening the Aquarion Logos and destroy the world. She met Akira once when they were children and he promised her to become the savior who would save the world so Maia was allowed to live on.

Kokone Kikogami (綺声神 心音, Kikogami Kokone)
Voiced by: Haruka Chisuga (Japanese); Alexis Tipton (English)
A shy girl who can barely talk, Kokone lost her ability to talk with confidence after a tragic event from her childhood. She aims to become an actress and joined the Verbalism Club in order to improve her speech and eventually falls in love with Akira, but views Maia as a rival, believing that she is also infatuated on him as well while she was just following him around by Sōgon's orders. She pilots the white-colored Vector-03, specialized in enemy disruption and rear support.
Hayato Kujyo (空篠 翼人, Kūjō Hayato)
Voiced by: Yuichiro Umehara (Japanese); Eric Vale (English)
A cool-headed young man who aims to become a politician like his late father, and just like Tsutomu, joined the Verbalism Club seeking to improve his speech for his own sake, and his will to develop detailed strategies before acting usually puts him at odds with Akira, who usually acts without much thinking. He pilots the blue-colored Vector-05, focused on mobility and high speed.
Tsutomu Domon (土聞 努虫, Domon Tsutomu)
Voiced by: Takayuki Asai (Japanese); Jessie James Grelle (English)
A young aspiring comedian whose older brother is a famous comedian himself, and despite knowing that he is not near as talented as him, he seeks his own form of comedy, performing unusual sketches that so far earned him only one avid fan. He joined the Verbalism Club seeking to make use of the training against the M.J.B.K. to improve his comedy skills, and pilots the attack-oriented, yellow-colored Vector-04, specialized in hit and run tactics.
Karan Uminagi (海凪 花嵐, Uminagi Karan)
Voiced by: Ari Ozawa (Japanese); Carrie Savage (English)
The youngest member of the team, Karan is a little girl who was aiming to become an idol and joined the Verbalism Club seeking support for her career, until Akira realizes that she wanted to be an idol just to please her mother's selfish desires and when he helped them reconcile, she started pursuing her true dream, which is to become a voice actor. She pilots the pink-colored Vector-06, specialized in reconnaissance and ambush.

=== DEAVA ===
Sakurako Soda (粗朶 桜子, Sōda Sakurako)
Voiced by: Ryōko Shiraishi (Japanese); Caitlin Glass (English)
Sakurako was Sōgon's secretary until realizing the true nature of his plans, thus she betrays him and defects to the Japanese Government taking the Vectors and several other equipment from NESTA which she uses to establish DEAVA. Since then she is DEAVA's chief of operations, monitoring and instructing the members of the Verbalism Club during battles. She also manages the Shirobaco Maid Café which serves as a front for DEAVA's headquarters and as a place for Akira and the others to run several activities to train their Verbalism skills.
Shōko Iwagami (岩上 ショウコ, Iwagami Shōko)
Voiced by: Saima Nakano (Japanese); Tia Ballard (English)
Sakurako's aid who works at DEAVA. She was scouted at first to be part of the Verbalism Club, but later it was revealed that she has no Verbaism power at all, which is a strange fact itself as it is said that every individual has some kind of Verbalism on itself, albeit weak. Later it is revealed that said trait was a Verbalism power in itself, which was used to break free those under control of Subete's Verbalism skills. She also becomes Tsutomu's girlfriend and then assumes command of Vector-04 after his death.
Kento Yoshida (吉田 ケント, Yoshida Kento)
Voiced by: Toshifumi Nakabayashi (Japanese); Jeremy Inman (English)
Sakurako's right hand man who also works as Shirobaco's cook.

=== NESTA ===
Subete Kenzaki (剣嵜 総, Kenzaki Subete)
Voiced by: Yuto Adachi (Japanese); Jason Liebrecht (English)
The heir of NESTA Communications and Sōgon Kenzaki's son, he always tried to please his father to no avail. Upon giving up trying to find emotional support on him, he started trying to bond with Maia, the partner he was assigned to defend the MJBK's with. However, when Maia was forced to join DEAVA's side, he started desperately looking for a way to bring her back to his side by all means possible, including developing a dangerous method of increasing his powers by fusing his black-colored Vector-00 with the MJBK's themselves, risking his own body in the process. In the final battle against Sōgon, Subete is ultimately rejected by Maia, who disapproves his behavior. He later reappears, having learned the powers of the Book of Verbalism from his father to increase his power, and determined to destroy the world as Akira's self-proclaimed nemesis.
Sōgon Kenzaki (剣嵜 荘厳, Kenzaki Sōgon)
Voiced by: Jouji Nakata (Japanese); R. Bruce Elliot (English)
The CEO of NESTA Communications. He was the major antagonist for the first half of the series, creating MJBK's to destroy the written culture, and by consequence, the world in order to have it start over again. He claims that with the advent of Internet, the use of words was banalized to the point of doing more harm than good to society, thus it would lead to its eventual downfall. He is eventually stopped and defeated by the Verbalism Club in a final battle inside the Logos World and crushed to his death by a falling boulder.
Shintaro Hayashi (林 晋太郎, Hayashi Shintarō)
Voiced by: Takayuki Kondō
NESTA's chief researcher who developed the Vectors and remained loyal to Sōgon after Sakurako's betrayal. After Sōgon's death, he remains working at NESTA, now supporting Subete.

=== MJBK ===
The minions of Sōgon, the MJBK are monsters formed from the Logos World upon a text receiving his mystical syringes spawned from his book of magic. Upon formation the text they form in the real world will dissipate following their birth before using their meaning to cause physical destruction. Upon reaching the fullest extent of their power the MJBK will erase the concept of their meaning in the collective minds of humanity, irreparably damaging their ability to communicate and think.

- Maki: Appears in episode 1. Powers include matter twisting matter, tentacles, and tornado summoning.
- Byou: Appears in episode 2. Powers include illness spreading, tentacles, and body fog.
- Yume: Appears in episode 3. Powers include passion increasing related to dreams and twin laser beams.
- Koi: Appears in episode 4. Powers include love amplifying, suction mouth waves, extendable arms, a detachable head, and a forehead laser.
- Natsu: Appears in episode 5. Powers include low body temperature, ice blast, and icicle spawning.
- Dan: Appears in episodes 6 and 7. Powers include severing, probe spawning, and wall forming.
- En: Appears in episode 7. Powers include fire ball spawning and restraining bars.
- Mushi: Appears in episode 8. Powers include will power increasing based on desires and asexual reproduction.
- Kage: Appears in episode 9. Powers include dark mist, despair increasing, and stealth.
- Oto: Appears in episode 10. Powers include wave nullification, mouth sonic waves, and a thick shell.
- Uzu: Appears in episode 11. Powers include consuming messages via magnetic field, burrowing, coiling body
- Hanare: Appears in episode 12. Powers include body levitation, part separation, teleportation, a circular energy barrier, psychological deterioration kanji blasts, energy halo that can divide into two razors, and spatial loops.
- Mu: Appears in episode 13. concept erasing rocks, black hole body, and an energy beam.
- Hito: Appears in episode 14. It has no known powers.
- Teki: Appears in episode 17. Powers include hostility increase, a wormhole, and levitation.
- Uso: Appears in episode 18. Powers include emitting fog and stretching.
- Emi: Appears in episode 21. Mind control, levitation, laser spew, and teeth tentacles.
- Den: Appears in episodes 22 and 23. Powers include electric shocks, disabling electronics, and a magnetic net around the body.
- Subete: Appears in episodes 24 and 25. Powers include existential erasing and an eye energy beam.

=== Others ===
Kiryu (キリュウ, Kiryū)
Voiced by: Makoto Yasumura (Japanese); David Wald (English)
Nesta (ネスタ, Nesuta)
Voiced by: Risa Shimizu (Japanese); Colleen Clinkenbeard (English)

== Episode list ==
No.	Title	Original release date
1	"Shout! Sousei Gattai!" "Sakebe Sōsei Gattai" (Japanese: 叫べ!創声合体)	July 2, 2015
2	"Shine! Light of Thought" "Terase Ishi no Hikari" (Japanese: 照らせ!意志の光)	July 9, 2015
3	"Resound! A Dream for Me Alone" "Hibike Watashi dake no Yume" (Japanese: 響け!私だけの夢)	July 16, 2015
4	"Let Fly! An Arrow That Pierces the Heart" "Hanate! Kokoro iru ya!" (Japanese: 放て! 心射る矢!)	July 23, 2015
5	"Take It Back! Our Summer" "Torimodose! Oretachi no natsu" (Japanese: 取り戻せ! 俺たちの夏)	July 30, 2015
6	"Light Up! Your Strength" "Tomose! Onore no tsuyo-sa" (Japanese: 灯せ! 己の強さ)	August 6, 2015
7	"Burn It! The Savior's Flames" "Moyase! Guze no honō!" (Japanese: 燃やせ! 救世の炎!)	August 13, 2015
8	"Pierce It! The Insect Part" "Tsuranuke! Mushi no ichibu" (Japanese: 貫け! 虫の一分)	August 20, 2015
9	"Clear Them! The Inviting Shadows" "Harase! Sasoi no kage" (Japanese: 晴らせ! 誘いの影)	August 27, 2015
10	"Reach Them! My True Voice" "Todoke! Hontō no koe" (Japanese: 届け! 本当の声)	September 3, 2015
11	"Flap! Bound Wings" "Habatake! Shibarareta tsubasa" (Japanese: 羽ばたけ! 縛られた翼)	September 10, 2015
12	"Bring them Together! Heart and Heart" "Kasanero! Kokoro to kokoro" (Japanese: 重ねろ! 心と心)	September 17, 2015
13	"A Great Victory! Our Savior" "Dai shōri! Warera ga kyūseishu" (Japanese: 大勝利! 我らが救世主)	September 24, 2015
14	"Show it! You at Your Lowest" "Sarase! Saitei no jibun" (Japanese: 曝せ! 最低の自分)	October 1, 2015
15	"Ah! Days of Our Youth" "Ah! Seishun no hibi" (Japanese: 鳴呼! 青春の日々)	October 8, 2015
16	"Carve Them In! The Scars of Destiny" "Kizame! Shukumei no kizu" (Japanese: 刻め! 宿命の傷)	October 15, 2015
17	"Shatter! The one I Must Strike Down" "Kudake! Utsubeki mono" (Japanese: 砕け! 討つべきモノ)	October 22, 2015
18	"Howl! An Honest Beaten Dog" "Hoero! Shōjikina makeinu" (Japanese: 吠えろ！正直な負け犬)	October 29, 2015
19	"Fall in Love! Asagaya" "Koiseyo! Asagaya" (Japanese: 恋せよ! 阿佐ヶ谷)	November 5, 2015
20	"Know It! The Reason You Were Born" "Shire! Umareta imi" (Japanese: 知れ! 生まれた意味)	November 12, 2015
21	"Tragic! An Immoral Gattai" "Higeki teki desu! Fudoutoku na gattai" (Japanese: Tらぎc！ あん いっもらl がったい)	November 19, 2015
22	"Listen! The Voice Calling out to You" "Mimi wo katamukeru! Anata wo yobu koe" (Japanese: 聴く！声はきっとあなたにアウトを呼び出します)	November 26, 2015
23	"Revive! The Vow Beneath the Moonlight" "Yomigaere! Tsukiyo no chikai" (Japanese: 蘇れ! 月夜の誓い)	December 3, 2015
24	"To Battle! With My Existence on the Line" "Sentou kaishi da! Yuki ni jibun no sonzai wo" (Japanese: 戦いに！ライン上の私の存在と)	December 10, 2015
25	"Gather! Voices for Tomorrow" "Shuuketsu! Ashita no koe" (Japanese: ギャザー！明日のための声)	December 17, 2015
26	"It Will Not End! Aquarion Logos" "Sore ha owara nai! Akuerion no Rogos" (Japanese: それは終わりません！アクエリオンロゴス)	December 24, 2015
