= Aquarion Evol =

Japanese anime, manga and light novel series

- The Japanese Blu-ray cover of volume 1 featuring main character Amata Sora.

アクエリオンEVOL (Akuerion Evoru)
- Genre: Action; Drama; romance; Science Fiction
- Created by: Shōji Kawamori; Satelight
- Prequel
- Genesis of Aquarion (2005)
- Anime television series
- Directed by: Shōji Kawamori (Chief); Yūsuke Yamamoto
- Produced by: Hisanori Kunisaki; Makoto Itō; Osamu Hosokawa; Kentarō Yoshida; Atsushi Iwasaki; Masako Iwamoto; Shūsaku Iba
- Written by: Mari Okada
- Music by: Yoko Kanno; Ayako Ōtsuka
- Studio: Satelight; Eight Bit
- Licensed by: Crunchyroll (Note: In North America through Crunchyroll (formerly known as Funimation) and in Australia through Madman Anime.)
- Original network: TV Tokyo
- English network: US: Funimation Channel
- Original run: January 8, 2012 – June 24, 2012
- Episodes: 26
- Manga
- Illustrated by: Aogiri
- Published by: Media Factory
- Magazine: Monthly Comic Gene
- Original run: January 14, 2012 – June 13, 2014
- Volumes: 5
- Light novel
- Written by: Yasujiro Urayama
- Illustrated by: Kana Ishida, others
- Published by: MF Bunko J
- Original run: April 25, 2012 – December 12, 2012
- Volumes: 4
- Original video animation

Sōsei no Aquarion Love
- Directed by: Kenji Yasuda
- Written by: Mariko Mochizuki
- Music by: Yōko Kanno, Ayako Ōtsuka
- Studio: Satelight
- Licensed by: NA: Crunchyroll
- Released: July 2, 2015
- Runtime: 26 minutes
- Sequels
- Aquarion Logos (2015); Aquarion: Myth of Emotions (2025)

Aquarion Evol (アクエリオンEVOL, Akuerion Evoru) is the sequel to the 2005 anime series Genesis of Aquarion. It was originally announced on February 25, 2011, by the production staff. It aired on TV Tokyo from January to June, 2012 and its premiere featured an hour-long special that combined the first two episodes in a single broadcast. Funimation has licensed the anime in North America.

The story is set in the same universe as the original Genesis of Aquarion, and takes place twelve thousand years after. The protagonists live on a planet called Vega, while most of the antagonists originate from its "sister planet", Altair. The main character, Amata Sora, a young man that has kept his ability to fly a secret since youth, meets a girl named Mikono Suzushiro, and they become fast friends. However, invaders from Altair begin large-scale attacks against Vega, forcing Amata and Mikono into a long battle for the planet as members of an organization called Neo-DEAVA. There they, along with other young men and women called Elements who also possess special powers, are recruited to pilot giant robots called Aquaria in the defense of Vega.

Like the original, the themes of love, mutual understanding, and individual growth play an important role in the story, albeit in different ways. For example, a prohibition on romance is enacted on the members of Neo-DEAVA for the duration of the series. The main characters are again reincarnations of the legendary beings described in Aquarion, and much of the latter half of the series works to establish connections with the series' predecessor.

== Plot summary ==
Twelve thousand years after the events of Genesis of Aquarion, mankind living on the planet Vega (ヴェーガ, Vēga) is threatened by a new enemy from the planet Altair (アルテア界, Arutea Kai) whose female population was wiped out by a mysterious disease called the Curse of Eve (イヴの呪い, Ivu no Noroi). The Alteans using their "Abductors", just like the Shadow Angels, invade the cities in Vega to kidnap its female inhabitants, looking for a way to ensure the preservation of their race.

To defend against the invasion, the Neo-DEAVA (ネオ・ディーバ, Neo Dība) organization establishes two teams, one composed of only males and other of only females, each one piloting their own giant machines called "Aquaria". To protect their new friend Mikono, teenager Amata Sora makes use of the power he has kept in secret his entire life and by combining Vectors with male and female pilots into one single robot, the legendary giant Aquarion is reborn.

== Themes ==
Aquarion EVOL, while a giant robot show at heart, focuses mostly on the characters and character development. Of its many themes, that of love is the most prominent. The restriction placed on the members of Neo-DEAVA that forbids love at the same time permits a real development in the characters' relationships from infatuation and teen romance to love. It also presents a different view of love held by characters of Altair, whose perceptions of it are warped by the current state of their planet - that of the complete extinction of women. The theme of love is explored further in a few other examples, such as a character from Neo-DEAVA and an Altair spy growing very attached to each other, and another character being forced to examine his own feelings after his love interest is transformed into a man. Overall, love and relationships between characters lead to them being able to at least partially understand each other.

While not as big a theme as romantic love in the series, family relationships are also explored. Three of the main characters - Amata, Mikono, and MIX - all have strained relationships with parents for various reasons, and each is forced to come to terms with what those relationships have produced. Amata's feeling of abandonment, Mikono's feelings of shyness, and MIX's moral opposition to her father's behavior are all explored through the relationships they have with each other.

As in the original Aquarion, reincarnation of people of myth and legend is a major theme. However, the series repeatedly undermines assumptions made by the viewers, especially those that have watched the original series. The many plot twists regarding the identity of the characters' reincarnations are brought to a head during their final battle.

== Production ==
Many staff members from the original Aquarion were brought back to work on this series; however, as the director Kawamori wished to create a series that didn't require viewers to have seen the original, many themes were reworked.

The main character designs were split between two designers: Chinatsu Kurahana, who worked on the male characters, and Ishida Kana, who was in charge of the female ones.

== Media ==
=== Anime ===
Aquarion Evol first premiered on TV Tokyo on January 8, 2012, in a one-hour special featuring its two first episodes. Just like the original series, it is produced by studio Satelight and directed by Shoji Kawamori. It was announced at Supanova Melbourne 2012 that Madman Entertainment had acquired the series for English release. At Otakon 2012, Satelight had announced that Funimation (whom later confirmed) has licensed the series.

=== Manga ===
On January 14, 2012, the manga began publishing by Media Factory, an adaptation of the anime written by Aogiri.

=== OVA ===
Sōsei no Aquarion Love is an OVA featuring a crossover between characters from both Aquarion Evol and its prequel Genesis of Aquarion. It aired in Japan on July 2, 2015, just before the premiere of the third Aquarion series Aquarion Logos.

=== Light novel ===
On April 25, 2012, a light novel adaptation of the anime, written by Yasujiro Uchiyama, began serialization by MF Bunko J, with illustrations by Kana Ishida, one of the anime's character designers.

=== Theme songs ===
Opening theme

- "Kimi no Shinwa ~ Aquarion Dai 2 Shou" (君の神話～アクエリオン第二章, Kimi no Shinwa ~ Akuerion Dai Ni Shō; "Your Legend, Aquarion Chapter 2") by AKINO with bless4(ep. 3–15)
- "Paradoxical ZOO" (パラドキシカルZOO, Paradokishikaru Zū) by AKINO with bless4(ep. 16–26)

Ending themes

- "Gekkō Symphonia" (月光シンフォニア, Gekkō Shinfonia; "Moonlight Symphonia") by AKINO & AIKI of bless4
- "Yunoha no Mori" (ユノハノモリ; "Yunoha's Forest") by Yui Ogura as Yunoha Thrul (ep. 15–25)

Insert songs

Several pieces of music from Genesis of Aquarion's original soundtrack are featured as insert songs, among brand new compositions.

- "Eve no Danpen" (イヴの断片, Ivu no Danpen; "Fragment of the Eve") by AKINO from bless4 (ep. 4, 6, 11, & 17)
- "Omna Magni" (オムナ マグニ; "I Can Fly") by Yui Makino (ep.7)
- "Go Tight!" by AKINO from bless4 (ep. 8)
- "Pride, Nageki no Tabi" (プライド〜嘆きの旅, Puraido ~ Nageki no Tabi; "Pride, A Journey of Grief") by AKINO from bless4 (ep. 10, 18, & 24)
- "Aquaria Mau Sora" (アクエリア舞う空, Akueria Mau Sora; "Skies of Aquaria") by The Member of LSOT (ep. 12, 19, & 24)
- "Kōya no Heath" (荒野のヒース, Kōya no Hīsu; "Heath of the Wastelands") by AKINO from bless4 (ep. 13)
- "Genesis of Aquarion" by AKINO from bless4, with English lyrics by bless4 (ep. 14, & 26)
- "Genesis of Aquarion" (創聖のアクエリオン, Sōsei no Akuerion) by AKINO from bless4 (ep. 16)
- "Nike 15-sai" (ニケ15歳, Nike Jūgo-sai; "Fifteen-Year-Old Nike") by Akino (ep. 22)
- "ZERO Zero" (ZERO ゼロ, ZERO Zero) by AKINO from bless4 (ep. 26)

As with the original series, Yoko Kanno composed the theme music and soundtracks. Gabriela Robin wrote the lyrics to both of the theme songs. The original soundtrack, Aquarion Evol: Psalms of Eve (アクエリオン EVOL イヴの詩篇, Akuerion Evoru Ivu no Shihen), was released on May 23, 2012. An original album titled Love @ New Dimension, featuring all of the vocal tracks featured in Aquarion Evol with some new instrumentals by Kanno and new songs were released on July 25, 2012.
