= Genesis of Aquarion (song) =

2005 single by Akino

Single by Akino

from the album Lost in Time
- Released: April 27, 2005
- Recorded: 2005
- Studio: Victor Studio
- Genre: J-pop
- Length: 15:06
- Label: Victor
- Composer: Yoko Kanno
- Lyricist: Yuho Iwasato
- Producer: Yoko Kanno

Akino singles chronology
"Genesis of Aquarion" (2005)	"Go Tight!" (2005)

"Genesis of Aquarion" (Japanese: 創聖のアクエリオン, Hepburn: Sōsei no Akuerion) is the first opening theme of the anime series of the same name. Composed by Yoko Kanno, the song was originally performed by Akino. After its release and subsequent re-release for the Genesis of Aquarion pachinko game, it became very popular in Japan and was awarded the silver medal in the JASRAC awards for 2008. Its initial release resulted in a peak at #22 on the Oricon's weekly charts. The song is also popular in the Japanese Internet communities, having been included in several of the Kumikyoku Nico Nico Douga mashups, particularly its chorus which begins with "All this time these twelve-thousand years, I know I've been in love with you" (一万年と二千年前から愛してる, Ichiman nen to nisen nen mae kara aishiteru).

The song was successful digitally, and was certified as a triple platinum cellphone download, double platinum ringtone and gold PC download by the RIAJ in April 2011.

== Track list ==
1. "Genesis of Aquarion" (創聖のアクエリオン) – 4:44
2. "Pride: Nageki no Tabi" (プライド〜嘆きの旅, Puraido Nageki no Tabi; "Pride, A Journey of Grief") – 4:35
3. "Genesis of Aquarion (Little Mix)" – 1:01
4. "Genesis of Aquarion (Instrumental)" – 4:42

== Re-release ==
In 2007, the song was re-arranged and re-released for the use in the commercials for the Sankyo CR Fever Genesis of Aquarion pachinko game as sung by members of the cast. An EP with this version was first released digitally to the iTunes Store on October 10, 2007, and included versions of "Go Tight!" and "Kōya no Heath" sung by cast members. A CD single was later released on November 7, 2007, containing the version of "Genesis of Aquarion" sung by the cast members and was also later put on the iTunes Store. This version peaked at #14 on the Oricon Singles Weekly Charts and was eventually certified as the #189 song for 2008. In the re-released CD, AKINO is credited as "AKINO from bless4".

=== iTunes Store EP track list ===
"Genesis of Aquarion - EP"

Single by Apollo (Takuma Terashima), Silvia (Yumi Kakazu), Hong Lihua (Sanae Kobayashi)/Rena (Hiromi Satō)
- Released: October 10, 2007 (iTunes Store
- Genre: J-pop
- Length: 15:01
- Label: Victor
- Composer: Yoko Kanno
- Lyricist: Yuho Iwasato

1. "Genesis of Aquarion (Element Gattai Ver. (エレメント合体Ver., Eremento Gattai Ver.))" – 4:42
  - Apollo (Takuma Terashima), Silvia (Yumi Kakazu), Hong Lihua (Sanae Kobayashi)
2. "Go Tight! (Element Gattai Ver.)" – 4:39
  - Apollo (Takuma Terashima), Silvia (Yumi Kakazu), Hong Lihua (Sanae Kobayashi)
3. "Kōya no Heath (Rena Rune ver.)" (荒野のヒース リーナ・ルーンver., Kōya no Hīsu Rīna Rūn ver.) – 5:40
  - Rena (Hiromi Satō)

=== CD single track list ===
"Genesis of Aquarion"
- Cover for the CD single re-release

Single by Apollo (Takuma Terashima), Silvia (Yumi Kakazu), Hong Lihua (Sanae Kobayashi)/AKINO from bless4
- Released: November 7, 2007
- Genre: J-pop
- Length: 14:13
- Label: Victor
- Composer: Yoko Kanno
- Lyricist: Yuho Iwasato

1. "Genesis of Aquarion (Element Gattai Ver.)" – 4:45
2. "Genesis of Aquarion (Original Ver.)" – 4:45
  - Akino (credited as "AKINO from bless4")
3. "Genesis of Aquarion (Instrumental)" – 4:44
  - This track is not included in the iTunes release of the single.

== Other versions ==
For the first Genesis of Aquarion soundtrack, AKINO performed the song with her older brother Akashi on backing vocals titled "Genesis of Aquarion (With My Brother)" (創聖のアクエリオン お兄さまと, Sōsei no Akuerion Oniisama to). For the second soundtrack, AKINO, with the rest of bless4 on backing vocals (and credited as the lyricists), performed an a cappella/piano/gospel style version of the song with English lyrics written by the group titled "Genesis of Aquarion" (always written in the English alphabet). This version was included as a bonus track on her debut album Lost in Time. Live performances of the song are often a mix between an acapella arrangement of the predominantly English version ("Genesis of Aquarion") before the music begins for the Japanese version ("創聖のアクエリオン").

== Cover versions ==
Yoko Ishida performed a cover version to include on her Hyper Yocomix 2 album. Masaaki Endoh also performed a cover version which was included on his first Enson cover album. The group m.o.v.e also covered the song for their anim.o.v.e. 01 album. The song was also covered for Konami's Guitar Freaks and Drummania series of games.

The song was covered in the mobile rhythm game BanG Dream! Girls Band Party! by the group Poppin'Party featuring voice actress Aina Aiba of Roselia.
