= Akino (singer) =

Japanese-American pop singer (born 1989)

AKINO
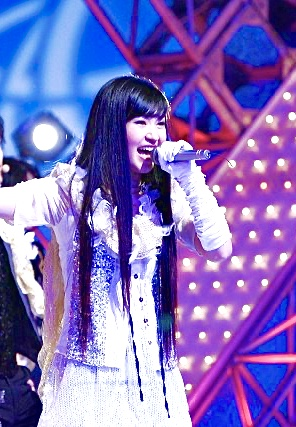
- Akino in 2012

Background information
- Also known as: AKINO
- Born: Akino Kawamitsu (川満 愛希信, Kawamitsu Akino); December 31, 1989 (age 36); Utah, U.S.
- Origin: Okinawa Prefecture, Japan
- Genre: Pop
- Occupation: Singer
- Years active: 2005–present
- Labels: Victor (2005) flying dog (2007)
- Member of: bless4
- Website: http://bless4.jp/

Akino Kawamitsu (川満 愛希信, Kawamitsu Akino), known mononymously as Akino, is a Japanese-American singer.

== Career ==
Originally debuting in 2003 with her brothers Akashi and Aiki and her sister Kanasa in the band bless4, Akino made her solo debut in 2005 with the singles "Genesis of Aquarion" and "Go Tight", the opening themes of the anime series Genesis of Aquarion composed by Yoko Kanno.

In 2006, Akino released "A Chance to Shine", the opening theme for the French-Japan anime series Oban Star-Racers.

In 2012, she released other singles under Yoko Kanno's composition, including "Kimi no Shinwa ~ Aquarion Dai 2 Shou" and "Paradoxical ZOO", the opening themes for the anime series Aquarion Evol.

In 2014, Akino and bless4 released "Extra Magic Hour", the opening theme for the anime series Amagi Brilliant Park, and in 2015, released "Miiro", the opening theme for the anime series Kantai Collection, based on the game of the same name by Kadokawa Games.

In 2016, Akino and bless4 released "Golden Life", the first opening theme for the anime series Active Raid, and "Cross the Line" the opening theme for the anime series Izetta: The Last Witch.

In 2022, Akino was featured as the vocalist for the song "Scream" which was released as BGM for two fights in the Pandemonium Abyssos raid series of Final Fantasy XIV.

In 2024, Akino provide the vocals for Final Fantasy XIV:Dawntrail's ending theme Smile.

== Discography ==
=== Singles ===
- "Genesis of Aquarion" (創聖のアクエリオン, Sōsei no Akuerion) - April 27, 2005
- "Go Tight!" - August 24, 2005
- "Genesis of Aquarion" & "Go Tight!"- August 24, 2011 (re-release)
- "Kimi no Shinwa ~ Aquarion Dai 2 Shou" (君の神話 ～アクエリオン第二章, Kimi no Shinwa ~ Akuerion Dai Ni Shō; "Your Mythology, Aquarion Chapter 2") - February 15, 2012
- "Extra Magic Hour" - 2014
- "Jet Coaster Ride" - 2014
- "Miiro" - 2015
- "Just Moving On Now" - 2015
- "Golden Life" - 2016
- "Cross the Line" - 2016

=== Albums ===
- Lost in Time - November 7, 2007
  - Includes "Chance To Shine" (Ōban Star-Racers Japanese opening) and "Suashi" (素足; Ending theme for Genesis of Aquarion: Wings of Betrayal)
- Decennia - March 25, 2015
- your ears, our years - March 24, 2021
  - Album spans 3 discs and has 37 songs. There is also an edition that comes with a Blu-ray Disc.

=== Genesis of Aquarion soundtracks ===
- Genesis of Aquarion: Original Soundtrack - June 8, 2005
  - Includes "Kōya no Heath" (荒野のヒース, Kōya no Hīsu; Aquarion Ep. 14 ending theme) & "Sōsei no Aquarion With My Brother" (創聖のアクエリオン お兄さまと, Sōsei no Akuerion Oniisama to; performed with Akashi Kawamitsu)
- Genesis of Aquarion: Original Soundtrack 2 - September 22, 2005
  - Includes the insert songs "Nike 15-sai" (ニケ15歳, Nike Jūgo-sai) and "Genesis of Aquarion" (English version of "Sōsei no Aquarion")

=== Aquarion Evol soundtracks ===
- Aquarion Evol: Psalms of Eve - May 23, 2012
  - Includes "Paradoxical Zoo (パラドキシカルZOO, Paradokishikaru Zū; Evol 2nd opening) and "Eve no Danpen" (イヴの断片, Ivu no Danpen; Evol insert song)
- Aquarion Evol: Love@New Dimension - July 25, 2012
  - Includes "Zero Zero" (ZERO ゼロ; Evol Ep. 26 insert) and "Genesis of Love ~ Ai no Kigen" (Genesis of LOVE～愛の起源; remix of "Genesis of Aquarion")
