= Genesis of Aquarion =

Japanese anime television series

- Cover of the first DVD volume of Genesis of Aquarion featuring main character Apollo

創聖のアクエリオン (Sōsei no Akuarion)
- Genre: Action; Mecha
- Created by: Shōji Kawamori; Kunihiko Yuyama; Satelight
- Anime television series
- Directed by: Shōji Kawamori; Tomokazu Tokoro (assistant)
- Produced by: Atsushi Iwasaki; Takao Minegishi; Hiroyuki Hattori; Jun Satoyoshi; Tsutomu Kasai
- Written by: Hiroshi Ōnogi; Shōji Kawamori
- Music by: Hisaaki Hogari; Yoko Kanno
- Studio: Satelight
- Licensed by: Crunchyroll (Note: In North America through Crunchyroll (formerly known as Funimation) and in Australia through Madman Anime.): UK: MVM Films
- Original network: TV Tokyo
- English network: NA: Funimation Channel
- Original run: April 4, 2005 – September 26, 2005
- Episodes: 26
- Manga

Sousei no Aquarion: Mirai Shinwa
- Illustrated by: Masamune Takahashi
- Published by: Fujimi Shobo
- Magazine: Monthly Dragon Age
- Published: 2005
- Volumes: 1
- Novel

Aquarion I
- Written by: Hiroshi Ōnogi
- Illustrated by: Eiji Kaneda
- Published by: Fujimi Shobo
- Imprint: Fujimi Fantasia Bunko
- Published: August 25, 2005
- Novel
- Written by: Hiroshi Ōnogi
- Illustrated by: Eiji Kaneda
- Published by: Kadokawa Shoten
- Imprint: Kadokawa Comics Dragon Jr.
- Published: December 25, 2005
- Manga

Sousei no Aquarion - Kokuu no Tenshi
- Written by: Keiji Asakawa
- Published by: Flex Comix
- Magazine: FlexComix NEXT
- Original run: August 11, 2009 – February 10, 2012
- Volumes: 6
- Sequels
- Aquarion Evol (2012); Aquarion Logos (2015); Aquarion: Myth of Emotions (2025)

Genesis of Aquarion (創聖のアクエリオン, Sōsei no Akuerion), also known simply as Aquarion is a Japanese anime television series written and directed by Shoji Kawamori, produced by Satelight. Set in the future, a giant fighting machine called the Aquarion is humanity's only effective weapon in the fight against the technologically advanced species called the Shadow Angels. Aquarion was broadcast on TV Tokyo from April 4 to September 26, 2005. An alternate retelling of the television series, the Genesis of Aquarion OVA, premiered on May 25, 2007. The television series is licensed in North America by Funimation, currently known as Crunchyroll. On April 27, 2009, the series made its North American television debut on the Funimation Channel. A sequel to the series titled Aquarion Evol (アクエリオンEVOL, Akuerion Evoru) was announced on February 25, 2011, and aired in 2012.

== Plot ==
Twelve thousand years in the past, mankind was at the mercy of mythical creatures known as Shadow Angels (堕天翅, Datenshi), immortal winged beings with overwhelming powers and technology. That is, until one of their kind, Apollonius, fell in love with a female human warrior, Seliane. Apollonius joins forces with the humans to free mankind from oppression, by using the legendary giant fighting robot Aquarion (アクエリオン, Akuerion).

Eleven years prior to the story, in a disaster referred to as the "Great Catastrophe" Earth's magnetic field shifted devastating significant parts of the world and killing off many of its inhabitants. Along with the disaster came the return of the Shadow Angels who had been in slumber in their city of Atlantia (アトランディア, Atorandia) since their battle with Apollonius. The Shadow Angels began invading human cites to harvest human beings, dubbing them "the wingless ones", like cattle, to extract prana (プラーナ, purāna; life force) from the captured humans. Their prana serves as energy and nutrition not only to the Shadow Angels, but also to the legendary Tree of Life (生命の樹, Seimei no Ki). The Shadow Angels facilitate their harvesting via giant, floating harvesting machines called harvest beasts (収穫獣, shūkakujū) which are guarded by giant mecha called Cherubim Soldiers (ケルビム兵, Kerubimu Hei). They are sentient machines, yet there are times when they are piloted by Shadow Angels.

Ordinary weapons prove ineffective against the Cherubim, and rings of projectors around the remaining cities, tapping into Earth's strata to project a quantum shield to keep Shadow Angels from entering or materializing in them, provide only limited protection. However a human expedition under the leadership of Gen Fudo excavates three very technologically advanced fighter planes, and an organization called DEAVA (ディーバ, Dība; Division of EArth Vitalization Advancement) takes over the research of these planes, called Vectors (ベクター, Bekutā), trying to identify how to use them. The three Vectors, colored mostly in white, are identified as the green Vector Luna (ベクタールナ, Bekutā Runa), the blue Vector Mars (ベクターマーズ, Bekutā Māzu), and the red Vector Sol (ベクターソル, Bekutā Soru). DEAVA discovers only people with special powers, called Elements (エレメント, Eremento), can use the Vectors and the three Vectors are in fact the pieces of Aquarion, the same robot used to fight the Shadow Angels twelve millennia before. They also discover the Elements can ultimately unite the Vectors into one of three formations of the giant robot in battle, and can use it to fight and defeat the Cherubim.

During the Elements' first sortie against the Cherubim by uniting the Vectors into a formation of Aquarion, they stumble on 13-year-old Apollo, who seems to be the reincarnation of Apollonius. They become convinced of this when he single-handedly takes control of the Vector Sol, unites the Vectors into the Solar Aquarion formation and defeats the enemy, thus causing him to be recruited by DEAVA to join their ranks.

== Religious references ==
=== Age of Aquarius ===
The Age of Aquarius, also known as the Aquarian Age, was a concept popularized by Carl Gustav Jung. The Age of Aquarius was seen in contraposition to the current Age of Pisces: whereas the Age of Pisces represents duality and antithesis (thus, conflict), the Age of Aquarius is an age of synthesis and spiritualism (in some ways, a new golden age). In the New Age, because of the implications of love, comprehension and one-ness, it can be associated with the fourth chakra. Aquarion as a name is a reference to this concept, but the show digs deeper in symbolism in using the Aquarion as an instrument for a "new era of holy genesis", managing to resolve conflict between the opposing parties of humans and Shadow Angels and showing a not-so-metaphorical process of oneness with the Earth.

=== Yoga ===
Aquarion's main theme references Indian lore. The word yoga is translated as "unite" and means "union with the divine through the integration of body, mind and spirit" (in Japanese, the word "kokoro" refers to both heart or mind, but is more often translated as just the heart). During Unification, the Elements merge their bodies, minds and spirits, but a real Unification of the Aquarion can only be obtained with a Shadow Angel on board, fitting the scheme of the divine element necessary into order to achieve true Unification and completing Aquarion's power.

=== Prapti and the Infinity Punch ===
Yogis are said to develop special powers called siddhis. One of them is called prapti (acquisition) and with this Siddhi, the perfect mystic yogi can not only touch the Moon, but he can extend his hand anywhere and take whatever he likes. In the series, the Solar Aquarion's Infinity Punch manages to reach the Moon, although the real prapti should not involve greatly elongated arms, but rather the ability to cancel distances between objects (resulting in the idea of omnipresence). In this sense, the real prapti in the show is perhaps used by Gen Fudo, who makes things appear out of nothing from his hand. Another siddhi called Mahima is the ability to become incredibly big; this may be referenced to the Aquarion's ability to expand itself in size during particular battles with the Cherubim.

=== Apollonius ===
The character Apollonius is a passing nod to Greek mythology, seemingly inspired by Apollo, the Greek god of light and Prometheus, who gave fire to humans and was punished by Zeus by having an eagle feast on his liver. Similarly, Apollonius is a Shadow Angel who seems to have light-like powers and gives the humans a fighting chance against the Shadow Angels with the Aquarion, but loses his wings as punishment from the other Shadow Angels. Like Apollonius of Tyana, Aquarion's Apollonius dies and is believed to be reincarnated as the protagonist Apollo, while the Greek god Apollo is stated to have been born in the bank of a lake, Aquarion's Apollo is given his name after he swims in a lake.

=== The Tree of life ===
Atlandia's Tree of Life took on two roles throughout the series. It is basically a large pile of multicolored flowers. The arrangement of the flowers at the end of the top central flowering portion can be easily seen forming the ten interconnecting nodes of the Sephirot from Hebrew Bible/Christianity, only that the flower at the top middle center of this arrangement, the spot that is supposed to symbolize the unity of the nodes, is absent. The tree's first role was made by the Shadow Angels to use it to restart the Shadow Angel race. The second role was its original role and was a similar function to its name, it literally contained the entire planet's life force. Because of this, if that force was unleashed as a power such as to give birth to a race of species, the planet would become lifeless and the tree would die, causing its remains to fall to the Earth's core and make the planet fall apart. This was something the Shadow Angels, who had possession of and took care of the tree, oddly did not know.

== Theme music ==
Opening songs

1. "Genesis of Aquarion" (創聖のアクエリオン, Sousei no Aquarion) by Akino (Episodes 1–17)
2. "Go Tight!" by Akino (Episode 18–26)

Ending songs

1. "Omna Magni" (オムナ マグニ, lit. 'I Can Fly') by Yui Makino
2. "Kōya no Heath" (荒野のヒース, lit. 'The Heath of the Wasteland') by Akino
3. "Celiane" by Gabriela Robin

Other themes

- "Nike 15-sai" (ニケ15歳, Nike Jūgo-sai; lit. "Fifteen-Year-Old Nike") by Akino
- "Genesis of Aquarion" by Akino (English lyrics by Bless4)
- "Pride, Nageki no Tabi" (プライド〜嘆きの旅, Puraido ~ Nageki no Tabi; lit. 'Pride, A Journey of Grief') by AKINO from bless4

Yoko Kanno is the composer of the soundtrack music. Performed by the Warsaw Philharmonic Orchestra.

== Other appearances ==
- Genesis of Aquarion made its video game debut in the Sony PlayStation 2 game Super Robot Wars Z. It has also appeared in the PlayStation 3 game Another Century's Episode R and the PSP game 2nd Super Robot Wars Z (both parts).

== Reception ==
In the United States of America, Genesis of Aquarion has been praised for its excellent mecha designs, musical score and animation style. The story, however, has mixed reviews. AnimeonDVD, and Anime News Network has rated the series overall a C+, claiming that Aquarion tries to please everyone with the different elements that are reminiscent of other series, and fails to establish its own identity.

== See also ==
- Neon Genesis Evangelion
- Aquarian Age
