= Bless4 =

Japanese vocal ensemble

bless4
- Origin: Okinawa Prefecture, Japan
- Years active: 2003–present
- Labels: Kawamitsu Artatainment/Ariola Japan/Sony Music Entertainment
- Members: AKASHI; KANASA; AKINO
- Past members: AIKI
- Website: bless4.jp

bless4 is a Japanese vocal ensemble from the United States consisting of four siblings from the Kawamitsu family. Youngest sister Akino has her own solo musical career, and youngest brother Aiki has also released a solo single (with eldest brother Akashi arranging) to accompany his book.

== History ==
All but Akashi were born within the United States, as their father Haru brought his family to Utah to further his education at Brigham Young University shortly after Akashi was born. They moved to Arizona and there both Akashi and Kanasa were Arizona State Taekwondo Champions (at ages 14 and 12, respectively), while the whole family was part of a taekwondo exhibition troupe called the "Flying Dragons" with other taekwondo practitioners.

Haru brought his family back to Okinawa in 1997 after feeling a spiritual longing for his heritage as an Okinawan.

They made their debut in May 2003 from BMG Japan with the song "Good Morning! Mr. Sunshine"

All four now reside in Kawasaki, Kanagawa Prefecture, and remain followers of the Church of Jesus Christ of Latter-day Saints.

They made their own independent company in December 2006 with AKASHI as the President of Kawamitsu Arttainment.

In 2009, the group contributed the songs "Stitch Is Coming" (スティッチ・イズ・カミング, Sutitchi Izu Kamingu) and "Hitori Ja Nai" (ひとりじゃない, "You Are Not Alone") for the Disney Animation Studios anime Stitch!, the former serving as an ending theme for its first season.

In February 2010, the youngest, AIKI made his debut as an author of a non-fiction novel, based on his own experiences of losing a friend to drugs, titled "Heart Prints ~inochi no hana~". (From Bungeisha)

In March 2011, their company became a limited company and opened their own record label: KAWAMITSU RECORDS.

May 2010, they held their first Korean tour performing at 3 different places in Korea, including Seoul, which proved to be a success.

In September, the group released the single "Dandelion" in Europe on the German record label Marabu Records. The song placed #1 on the Radio Berlin International Charts.

They released their newest album "Yumetsumugi" (Dream Weaving) on January 12, 2011, 6 years after their debut album. It is a self-produced album with each member working as staff to bring their music video and album to life.

On April 19, 2022, Aiki announced his departure from the band in order to concentrate his life on his family and his current endeavours.

== Members ==
Current members

- Akashi Kawamitsu (川満 証, Kawamitsu Akashi, AKASHI) - Born January 29, 1982 (age 43) in Okinawa Prefecture
- Kanasa Kawamitsu (川満 愛, Kawamitsu Kanasa, KANASA) - Born May 2, 1984 (age 40) in Utah
- Akino Kawamitsu (川満 愛希信, Kawamitsu Akino, AKINO) - Born December 31, 1989 (age 35) in Utah

Former members

- Aiki Kawamitsu-Douglas (川満 ダグラス 哀行, Kawamitsu Dagurasu Aiki, AIKI) - Born October 29, 1991 (age 33) in Utah

== Discography ==
=== Singles ===
1. "Good Morning! Mr. Sunshine" - May 7, 2003
2. "Hashire! Kiseki" (走れ！奇跡, "Run! Miracle") - August 6, 2003
3. "Gajumaru no Shita de" (ガジュマルの下で, "Beneath the Okinawa Banyan") - February 25, 2004 (Okinawa Prefecture), October 13, 2004 (Japan)
4. "123" (ワン・トゥー・スリー, Wan Tū Surī) - January 19, 2005
5. "Kizuna no Hana" (絆の花, "Floral Bonds") - July 21, 2007
6. "Stitch Is Coming" (スティッチ・イズ・カミング, Sutitchi Izu Kamingu)/"Hitorijanai" (ひとりじゃない, "You Are Not Alone") - October 7, 2009 (Digital Release)
7. "Dandelion" - September 22, 2010
8. "Sunshine Dancer" - May 21, 2012

==== Aiki ====
- "Heart Prints (Flowers of Life)" (Heart Prints～命の花～, Heart Prints ~Inochi no Hana~) - June 26, 2008 (Okinawa Prefecture)
- "Heart Prints (Flowers of Life)" (Heart Prints～命の花～, Heart Prints ~Inochi no Hana~) - February 2010 (From publishing company Bungeisha)

=== Albums ===
- His Love/Aruji no Ai (His Love／主の愛, His Love/The Master's Love) - As "Kawamitsu Family"
- ALL 4 ONE - February 2, 2005
- Yume Tsumugi (夢つむぎ, Dreams Weaving) - January 12, 2011
- WE ARE WARRIORS - June 5, 2019
