= Ryza =

Ryza or Ryzza may refer to:

== People ==
- Ryza Cenon (born 1987), Filipina actress, dancer, model, and painter
- Ryzza Mae Dizon (born 2005), Filipina actress and television presenter

== Others ==
- Reisalin "Ryza" Stout, the protagonist of the "Secret" trilogy of Atelier games: Ever Darkness & the Secret Hideout, Lost Legends & the Secret Fairy, and Alchemist of the End & the Secret Key.
- The Ryzza Mae Show, Philippine talk show
