= Yōhei Azakami =

Japanese voice actor (born 1991)

- 阿座上 洋平
- Azakami in 2026
- Born: August 7, 1991 (age 35); Gunma Prefecture, Japan
- Occupation: Voice actor
- Years active: 2011–present
- Agent: Aoni Production
- Notable credits: Kuromukuro as Kennosuke Tokisada Ōma; Sakura Wars as Seijuro Kamiyama; When Will Ayumu Make His Move? as Ayumu Tanaka; Mobile Suit Gundam: The Witch from Mercury as Guel Jeturk; Ron Kamonohashi's Forbidden Deductions as Ron Kamonohashi; Honkai: Star Rail as Mydei; Sentenced to Be a Hero as Xylo Forbartz; Steel Ball Run: JoJo's Bizarre Adventure as Gyro Zeppeli
- Spouse: Hitomi Ōwada (m. 2024)

Yōhei Azakami (阿座上 洋平, Azakami Yōhei; born August 7, 1991) is a Japanese voice actor affiliated with Aoni Production. He gained recognition for his roles as Guel Jeturk in Mobile Suit Gundam: The Witch from Mercury and Xylo Forbartz in Sentenced to Be a Hero.

== Biography ==
Azakami was born in Gunma Prefecture on August 7, 1991. He attended Aoni Juku, the voice acting school of talent agency Aoni Production. He joined their agency in 2011 after graduating. Azakami initially performed under the stage name Yōhei Hosono (細野 洋平, Hosono Yōhei), until he changed it to Yōhei Azakami in 2012. He starred in his first lead role as Kennosuke Tokisada Ōma in the 2016 anime series Kuromukuro.

On January 1, 2024, Azakami and voice actress Hitomi Ōwada announced their marriage. In March 2024, he was one of the recipients of the Best Supporting Actor Award at the 18th Seiyu Awards.

== Filmography ==
=== Television animation ===
2012

- Gakkatsu! as Hiroshi-kun

2016

- Kuromukuro as Kennosuke Tokisada Ōma

2017

- Piacevole! as Kirihide Konno
- Classroom of the Elite as Masayoshi Hashimoto

2018

- The Seven Deadly Sins as Deathpierce

2019

- One Piece as Charlotte Raisin, Inbi

2020

- Sakura Wars the Animation as Seijuro Kamiyama
- Plunderer as Genji Akui
- Get Up! Get Live! as Ren Kitami
- My Teen Romantic Comedy SNAFU Climax as Hatano

2021

- Godzilla Singular Point as Shunya Satō
- The Aquatope on White Sand as Kūya Yakamashi
- D_Cide Traumerei the Animation as Ryuuhei Oda
- Shinkansen Henkei Robo Shinkalion Z as Kannagi

2022

- Love All Play as Shо̄hei Sakaki
- Phantom of the Idol as Homare Hakata
- When Will Ayumu Make His Move? as Ayumu Tanaka
- The Prince of Tennis II: U-17 World Cup as Michael Bismarck
- Duel Masters Win as Prince Kaiser
- Mobile Suit Gundam: The Witch from Mercury as Guel Jeturk
- Bibliophile Princess as Irvin Olanza

2023

- Tsurune: The Linking Shot as Kenyū Ōtaguro
- Bungo Stray Dogs 4 as Tetchō Suehiro
- Flaglia as Tetsu
- Atelier Ryza: Ever Darkness & the Secret Hideout as Bos Brunnen
- Bikkuri-Men as Hood
- Firefighter Daigo: Rescuer in Orange as Hasebe
- Ron Kamonohashi's Forbidden Deductions as Ron Kamonohashi

2024

- Doctor Elise as Linden
- Brave Bang Bravern! as Lewis Smith
- Snack Basue as Yamada
- Oblivion Battery as Aoi Todo
- Delico's Nursery as Keith
- Blue Miburo as Toshizō Hijikata

2025

- Araiguma Calcal-dan as Comical
- Witch Watch as Rui Fujiki
- Clevatess as Mudo
- Kamitsubaki City Under Construction as Aguni
- Binan Kōkō Chikyū Bōei-bu Haikara! as Samon Nyuutou
- Solo Camping for Two as Akihito Takigawa
- Dusk Beyond the End of the World as Yokurata
- Backstabbed in a Backwater Dungeon as Oboro
- Digimon Beatbreak as Kyo Sawashiro
- Chitose Is in the Ramune Bottle as Kuranosuke Iwanami
- Umamusume: Cinderella Gray as Tadashi Kouchi

2026

- Sentenced to Be a Hero as Xylo Forbartz
- The Daily Life of a Part-time Torturer as Hugh
- The Holy Grail of Eris as Randolph Ulster
- The Invisible Man and His Soon-to-Be Wife as Akira Tounome
- Akane-banashi as Kyoji Arakawa
- Kujima: Why Sing, When You Can Warble? as Suguru Kōda
- Love Unseen Beneath the Clear Night Sky as Ushio Narumi
- Young Ladies Don't Play Fighting Games as Cafe Au Lait
- Victoria of Many Faces as Jeffrey
- Perfect Addiction as Akihito Kuji
- Saved by the Ice Cold Prince's Embrace as Clarence
- Hello, I am a Witch, and My Crush Wants Me to Make a Love Potion! as Harij

2027

- The Fledgling Demon Lord's Starter Shop as Ash
- The Case Files of Biblia Bookstore as Kikuya Kasai
- Shin Oishinbo as Shirō Yamaoka

=== Original net animation ===
2019

- Kengan Ashura as Iwan Karaev

2020

- Ghost in the Shell: SAC_2045 as Sanji Yaguchi

2021

- Shabake as Sasuke
- Gundam Breaker Battlogue as Kentarō Mahara

2022

- Spriggan as Jean Jacquemonde

2025

- Disney Twisted-Wonderland: The Animation as Yūken Enma

2026

- Love Through a Prism as Joffrey O'Brien
- Steel Ball Run: JoJo's Bizarre Adventure as Gyro Zeppeli

=== Anime films ===
2018

- Dragon Ball Super: Broly as Leek

2021

- Sailor Moon Eternal as Xenotime

2022

- Sword Art Online Progressive: Scherzo of Deep Night as Wolfgang
- The Seven Deadly Sins: Grudge of Edinburgh as Deathpierce

2024

- Gekijōban Inazuma Eleven: Aratanaru Eiyū-tachi no Joshō as Jōji Sakurazaki

2025

- Demon Slayer: Kimetsu no Yaiba – The Movie: Infinity Castle as Noguchi

=== Video games ===
2015

- Touken Ranbu as Shizukagata Naginata

2016

- Ys VIII: Lacrimosa of Dana as Franz, Captain Reed
- Samurai Warriors: Spirit of Sanada as Sasuke

2018

- God Eater 3 as Player (Male)

2019

- Jump Force as Venoms
- The Seven Deadly Sins: Grand Cross as Holy Knight Deathpierce
- Sakura Wars as Seijuro Kamiyama
- Atelier Ryza: Ever Darkness & the Secret Hideout as Bos Brunnen

2020

- Atelier Ryza 2: Lost Legends & the Secret Fairy as Bos Brunnen
- Ensemble Stars!! as Rinne Amagi

2021

- Samurai Warriors 5 as Shikanosuke Yamanaka
- Tsukihime -A piece of blue glass moon- as Michael Roa Valdamjong
- Melty Blood: Type Lumina as Michael Roa Valdamjong
- Tokimeki Memorial: Girl's Side 4th Heart as Minoru Nanatsumori
- D Cide Traumerei as Ryuuhei Oda

2022

- Digimon Survive as Ryou Tominaga

2023

- Atelier Ryza 3: Alchemist of the End & the Secret Key as Bos Brunnen

2024

- Eiyuden Chronicle: Hundred Heroes as Melridge
- Fate/Samurai Remnant as Zhao Yun
- Emio – The Smiling Man: Famicom Detective Club as Makoto Kuze

2025

- Dynasty Warriors: Origins as Cao Cao
- Honkai: Star Rail as Mydei
- Groove Coaster Future Performers as Ernest Sturm
- Inazuma Eleven: Victory Road as Jōji Sakurazaki
- Fire Emblem Shadows as Zasha
- Ninja Gaiden 4 as Yakumo

2027

- The Apothecary Diaries: The False Imperial Brother as Guanyu

=== Live-action television ===
- Hinatazaka de Aimashō (2019–present), narrator

=== Live-action films ===
- Meets the World (2025), Haramichi (voice; in-story anime character)

=== Concert ===
- Ensemble Stars! Cast Live Starry Symphony -the first light- (September 2023) (in-character as Rinne Amagi)
- Ensemble Stars! Cast Live Starry Symphony -the midnight sun- (June 2024) (in-character as Rinne Amagi)

=== Dubbing ===
- Eraser: Reborn (Mason Pollard (Dominic Sherwood))
- Shark Bait (Tom (Jack Trueman))
- The Winchesters (John Winchester (Drake Rodger))
