= Takuma Terashima =

Japanese voice actor and singer (born 1983)

- 寺島 拓篤
- Born: December 20, 1983 (age 42); Ishikawa Prefecture, Japan
- Occupation: Voice actor
- Years active: 2004–present
- Agent: Axlone
- Notable work: Log Horizon as Shiroe; Uta no Prince-sama as Otoya Ittoki; Genesis of Aquarion as Apollo; Servamp as Mahiru Shirota; Kokoro Connect as Yoshifumi Aoki; Black Clover as Klaus Lunettes; Blood Lad as Wolf; Beyblade Burst as Sisco Karlisle; Edens Zero as Shiki Granbell
- Spouse: Satomi Satō (m. 2017)
- Children: 1
- Musical career
- Genre: J-pop
- Instruments: Vocals; guitar
- Years active: 2012–present
- Label: Lantis

Takuma Terashima (寺島 拓篤, Terashima Takuma; born December 20, 1983 in Ishikawa, Japan) is a Japanese voice actor and singer. Terashima graduated from Tokyo Announce Gakuin, voice training school. He had initially belonged to Holypeak until December 2008, and then to Production Baobab up until September 2011 when he switched to Axlone, Toshiyuki Morikawa's own agency. He is married to voice actress Satomi Satō. On December 30, 2021, Terashima and Satō announced the birth of their first child.

== Filmography ==
=== Anime ===
Year	Title	Role	Ref
2005	Genesis of Aquarion	Apollo/Apollonius	
2006	Kiba	Gitora	
2006	Princess Princess	Harue Wataru	
2007	Bleach	Ruri'iro Kujaku	
2007	Hidamari Sketch	Mashiko	
2007	Saint Beast	Saki	
2007	Sisters of Wellber	Jin	
2007	Terra e...	Tachyon, Alfred and Sean	
2007	Zoku Sayonara Zetsubou Sensei	Kino Kuniya	
2008	Goku Sayonara Zetsubou Sensei	Kino Kuniya	
2008	Magician's Academy	Sakuma Eitarou	
2008	One Outs	Kawanaka Junichi	
2008	Shigofumi	Nojima Kaname	
2009	Chrome Shelled Regios	Lyia Heia Salinvan	
2009	Princess Lover!	Arima Teppei	
2009	Zan Sayonara Zetsubou Sensei	Kino Kuniya	
2010	Amagami SS	Umehara Masayoshi	
2010	Baka and Test	Kubo Toshimitsu	
2010	Break Blade	Io	
2010	Durarara!!	Togusa Saburo	
2010	Maid Sama!	Sarashina Ikuto	
2010	Tantei Opera Milky Holmes	Souseki Ishinagare	
2010	The Legend of the Legendary Heroes	Orla Sui	
2011	C³	Taizo Hakuto	
2011	Mobile Suit Gundam AGE	Desil Gallete/Asem Story	
2011	Sacred Seven	Tandoji Arma	
2011	The Idolmaster	Amagase Touma	
2011	Uta no Prince-sama Maji Love 1000% (Season 1)	Ittoki Otoya	
2011	Metal Fight Beyblade 4D	Bao	
2012	Aquarion Evol	Apollo	
2012	Amagami SS+	Umehara Masayoshi	
2012	Cross Fight B-Daman eS	Genta Ankokuji	
2012	Kokoro Connect	Yoshifumi Aoki	
2012	Jewelpet Kira☆Deco!	Retsu Akagi/Red	
2012	Metal Fight Beyblade Zero-G	Kite Unabara	
2012	My Little Monster	Yamaguchi Kenji	
2012	Tantei Opera Milky Holmes: Act 2	Soseki Ishinagare	
2012	Hyouka	Yamauchi	
2012	Aesthetica of a Rogue Hero	Zechs	
2013	Ace of Diamond	Naoyuki Zaizen	
2013	Blood Lad	Wolf	
2013	Hakkenden: Eight Dogs of the East	Kobungo Inuta	
2013	Makai Ouji: Devils and Realist	Dantalion	
2013	Mushibugyo	Mugai	
2013	The World God Only Knows: Goddesses	Ryo Asama	
2013	Tokyo Ravens	Shaver	
2013	Uta no Prince-sama Maji Love 2000% (season 2)	Ittoki Otoya	
2013	White Album 2	Takeya Iizuka	
2013	Maoyu	Merchant Youngster	
2013	Log Horizon	Shiroe	
2014	Log Horizon 2	Shiroe	
2014	Black Butler: Book of Circus	Snake	
2014	Broken Blade	Colonel Io	
2014	In Search of the Lost Future	Sō Akiyama	
2014	Jinsei	Takayuki Itō	
2014	Mekakucity Actors	Shintarō Kisaragi	
2014	Love, Chunibyo & Other Delusions -Heart Throb-	Chihiro	
2014	PriPara	Usagi, Rei Ando	
2014	The Irregular at Magic High School	Leonhard Saijo	
2014	When Supernatural Battles Became Commonplace	Hajime Kiryū	
2014	Amagi Brilliant Park	Wanipee	
2014	Baby Steps	Kojirō Kageyama	
2015	Baby Steps Season 2	Kojirō Kageyama	
2015	Comet Lucifer	Roman Valoff	
2015	Cute High Earth Defense Club LOVE!	Akoya Gero	
2015	Fairy Tail (season 7)	Jackal	
2015	Mikagura School Suite	Tonkyun	
2015	Uta no Prince-sama Maji Love Revolutions (Season 3)	Ittoki Otoya	
2016	Uta no Prince-sama Maji Love Legend Star (season 4)	Ittoki Otoya	
2016	Servamp	Mahiru Shirota	
2016	Super Lovers	Shima Kaidou	
2016	Haikyū!! Karasuno Kōkō VS Shiratorizawa Gakuen Kōkō	Eita Semi	
2016	Sousei no Onmyouji	Tatara	
2017	Atom: The Beginning	Ochanomizu Hiroshi	
2017	Beyblade Burst God	Sisco Karlisle	
2017	Kado: The Right Answer	Yaha-kui zaShunina	
2017	Konbini Kareshi	Haruki Mishima	
2017	Recovery of an MMO Junkie	Kazuomi Fujimoto	
2017	Black Clover	Klaus Lunettes	
2017	The iDOLM@STER SideM	Amagase Touma	
2018	The iDOLM@STER SideM: Wake Atte Mini!	Amagase Touma	
2018	B The Beginning	Kirisame	
2018	Beyblade Burst Super Z	Sisco Karlisle	
2018	Kakuriyo: Bed and Breakfast for Spirits	Hatori	
2018	Lord of Vermilion: The Crimson King	Minakami Haru	
2018	Radiant	Von Tepes	
2018	Seven Senses of the Re'Union	Clive Vivali	
2018	That Time I Got Reincarnated as a Slime	Satoru Mikami	
2018	Tsurune	Hiroki Motomura	
2018	Wotakoi: Love Is Hard for Otaku	Baba	
2018	3D Kanojo: Real Girl	Mitsuya Takanashi	
2019	3D Kanojo: Real Girl 2nd Season	Mitsuya Takanashi	
2019	7 Seeds	Ban	
2019	The Ones Within	Makino Aikawa	
2019	Kochoki: Wakaki Nobunaga	Maeda Toshiie	
2019	Try Knights	Tori Fuyuhara	
2019	A Certain Scientific Accelerator	Isaac Rosenthal	
2019	Is It Wrong to Try to Pick Up Girls in a Dungeon?	Marius Victrix Rakia	
2020	Beyblade Burst Superking	Sisco Karlisle	
2020	The Misfit of Demon King Academy	Lay Glanzudlii	
2020	King's Raid: Successors of the Will	Clause	
2021	Log Horizon: Destruction of the Round Table	Shiroe	
2021	B: The Beginning Succession	Kirisame	
2021	Tokyo Revengers	Atsushi "Akkun" Sendō	
2021	Edens Zero	Shiki Granbell	
2021	Osamake	Mitsuru Abe	
2021	Rumble Garanndoll	Akatsuki Shinonome	
2022	Miss Kuroitsu from the Monster Development Department	Kenji Sadamaki	
2022	Aharen-san Is Indecipherable	Raidō	
2022	Phantom of the Idol	Hikaru Setouchi	
2022	Eternal Boys	Etsurō Aizome	
2023	Sugar Apple Fairy Tale	Cat	
2023	Sacrificial Princess and the King of Beasts	Anubis	
2023	Atelier Ryza: Ever Darkness & the Secret Hideout	Lent Marslink	
2023	Ayaka: A Story of Bonds and Wounds	Jingi Sagawa	
2023	A Returner's Magic Should Be Special	Desir Herman	
2024	The Witch and the Beast	Loran	
2024	Bartender: Glass of God	Ryū Sasakura	
2024	Wonderful Pretty Cure!	Toyama Satoru	
2024	Kinokoinu: Mushroom Pup	Yara	
2025	Promise of Wizard	White	
2026	The Daily Life of a Part-time Torturer	Shiu	
2026	Yoroi Shinden Samurai Troopers	Kamanosuke	
2026	The Frontier Lord Begins with Zero Subjects	Richard	

=== Original video animation (OVA) ===
Year	Title	Role	Ref
2014	Black Butler: Book of Murder	Snake	
2015	Yankee-kun na Yamada-kun to Megane-chan to Majo	Gaku Izumi	
2019	Hi Score Girl: Extra Stage	Aulbath Ōimachi	

=== Original net animation (ONA) ===
Year	Title	Role	Ref
2023	Bastard!! Season 2	Joshua Berahia	

=== Anime Films ===
Year	Title	Role	Ref
2017	Black Butler: Book of the Atlantic	Snake	
2017	The Irregular at Magic High School: The Movie – The Girl Who Summons the Stars	Leonhard Saijo	
2018	Servamp -Alice in the Garden-	Mahiru Shirota	
2019	Uta no Prince-sama: Maji Love Kingdom	Ittoki Otoya	
2022	Uta no Prince-sama: Maji Love ST☆RISH Tours	Ittoki Otoya	
2024	Zegapain STA	Giten	
2025	Cute High Earth Defense Club Eternal Love!	Akoya Gero	

=== Drama CDs ===
Year	Title	Role	Ref
2008	Benriya-san	Ryuuichi Miyashiro	
2011	Saint Seiya	Gemini Saga and Gemini Kanon	
2010	Twinkle Stars	Yuuri Murakami	
2010	Houkago Play	Kareshi	
2013	Brother Shuffle!	Haruki Sakurai	
2014	Mekakucity Actors: the old days	Shintarō Kisaragi	
2015	Shuuen -Re:act-	C-ta	

=== Tokusatsu ===
Year	Title	Role	Ref
2014	Zyuden Sentai Kyoryuger vs. Go-Busters: The Great Dinosaur Battle! Farewell Our Eternal Friends	Neo-Geildon/Neo-Messiah	
2019	Ultraman Taiga	Ultraman Taiga	
2020	Ultraman Taiga: New Generation Climax	Ultraman Taiga	
2020	Ultra Galaxy Fight: The Absolute Conspiracy	Ultraman Taiga	
2022	Ultra Galaxy Fight: The Destined Crossroad	Ultraman Taiga	
2023	Ultraman New Generation Stars	Ultraman Taiga	

=== Video games ===
Year	Title	Role	Ref
2007	Super Robot Wars: Original Generations	Kōta Azuma	
2007	Super Robot Wars Original Generation Gaiden	Kōta Azuma	
2007	Fate/tiger colosseum	Avenger	
2007	Ijiwaru My Master	Leon	
2007	Super Robot Wars Z	Apollo	
2007	Amagami	Masayoshi Umehara	
2007	Lucian Bee's Resurrection Supernova	Jesse "Kid" Squire	
2008	Last Escort 2	Ryou	
2009	Soukou Akki Muramasa	Minato Kageaki	
2010	Super Robot Taisen OG Saga: Endless Frontier EXCEED	Kōta Kazuma	
2010	Moujuutsukai To Oujisama	Sylvio	
2010	Uta no Prince-sama	Ittoki Otoya	
2010	Uta no Prince-sama: Amazing Aria	Ittoki Otoya	
2011	Uta no Prince-sama: Sweet Serenade	Ittoki Otoya	
2011	Uta no Prince-sama Repeat	Ittoki Otoya	
2012	Moujuutsukai to Oujisama ~Snow Bride~	Sylvio	
2013	Uta no Prince-sama All Star	Ittoki Otoya	
2013	Seishun Hajimemashita!	Chihaya Futaba	
2013	Jojo's Bizarre Aventure: All Star Battle	Prosciutto	
2014	Fate/hollow ataraxia	Avenger/Angra Mainyu	
2014	Gakuen Heaven 2: Double Scramble	Kuya Sagimori	
2014	Granblue Fantasy	Cain	
2014	Shinobi, Koi Utsutsu	Sarutobi Sasuke	
2015	Uta no Prince-sama All Star After Secret	Ittoki Otoya	
2015	Broken Age	Shay Volta	
2015	Harukanaru Toki no Naka de 6	Arima Hajime	
2016	Fate/Grand Order	Thomas Edison, Angra Mainyu	
2016	DYNAMIC CHORD feat.Liar-S V edition	Hinoyama Sakura	
2016	Harukanaru Toki no Naka de 6 Gentou Rondo	Arima Hajime	
2017	Warriors All-Stars	Arima Hajime	
2017	Akane-sasu Sekai de Kimi to Utau	Date Masamune	
2018	Food Fantasy	Caviar, Yellow Wine, Tortoise Jelly	
2019	Mahoutsukai no Yakusoku	White	
2019	Atelier Ryza: Ever Darkness & the Secret Hideout	Lent Marslink	
2020	Atelier Ryza 2: Lost Legends & the Secret Fairy	Lent Marslink	
2021	Psychonauts 2	Nick Johnsmith/Gristol Malik	
2022	Honkai Impact 3rd	Lyle Collodi	
2022	Touken Ranbu Warriors	Omokage	
2022	Arknights	Stainless	
2023	Disgaea 7	Wey-yasu	
2023	Atelier Ryza 3: Alchemist of the End & the Secret Key	Lent Marslink	

=== Dubbing ===
Original year	Title	Role	Original actor	Ref
2013	Pawn Shop Chronicles	Johnny Shaw	Elijah Wood	
2022-present	The Gilded Age	Larry Russell	Harry Richardson	

== Discography ==
=== Albums ===
Year	Single details	Catalog No.
2012	magic words: Released: November 21, 2012; Label: Lantis; Format: CD	LACM-14025
2013	Star Tail: Released: July 3, 2013; Label: Lantis; Format: CD	LACM-14104
2014	Scarlet Sign: Released: March 12, 2014; Label: Lantis; Format: CD	LACM-14188
2020	ASSEMBLE: Released: March 25, 2020; Label: Lantis; Format: CD	LACA-15816

=== Singles ===
title	year	label	Catalog No.	Album
Nameless Story	Released: October 17, 2018	Label: Lantis	LACM-14798	ASSEMBLE
Megurumono	Released: February 27, 2019	Label: Lantis	LACM-14838	ASSEMBLE
Buddy, steady, go!	Released: August 28, 2019	Label: Lantis	LACM-14923	ASSEMBLE
Reincarnate	Released: August 25, 2020	Label: Lantis	LACM-24166	
