= Hitomi Ōwada =

Japanese voice actress

- 大和田 仁美
- Born: March 23; Kanagawa Prefecture, Japan
- Occupation: Voice actress
- Years active: 2013–present
- Agent: Aoni Production
- Height: 152 cm (5 ft 0 in)
- Spouse: Yōhei Azakami (m. 2024)

Hitomi Ōwada (大和田 仁美, Ōwada Hitomi; born March 23) is a Japanese voice actress from Kanagawa Prefecture. She is affiliated with Aoni Production.

On January 1, 2024, Ōwada and voice actor Yōhei Azakami announced their marriage.

== Filmography ==
=== Television animation ===
- Teekyū 2 (2013), Mika-san
- Teekyū 3 (2013), Mika-san, Shrine Maiden, Light music club member B
- A Good Librarian Like a Good Shepherd (2014), Child, Female Student B, Teacher A, Waitress 2
- Free! Eternal Summer (2014), Coach
- Hamatora (2014), Girl, Female College Student
- Majimoji Rurumo (2014), Yumi-chan
- Sakura Trick (2014), Ayumi Yoshida
- Shirobako (2014), Midori Imai
- Castle Town Dandelion (2015), Hitomi Ichijō
- Charlotte (2015), Sugimoto, Female Student Aida, Female Student Katō, TV Commercial Voice
- Rampo Kitan: Game of Laplace (2015), Copycat Criminal, Girl
- Teekyū 6 (2015), Mika-san
- Valkyrie Drive: Mermaid (2015), Resident, Hekuse, Kosugi
- And You Thought There Is Never a Girl Online? (2016), Nanako Akiyama/Sette
- Rilu Rilu Fairilu (2016), Carrot
- Alice & Zouroku (2017), Sana
- Fuuka (2017), Haruka Akitsuki
- New Game!! (2017), Tsubame Narumi
- Onagawa-chū Basuke-bu 5-nin no Natsu (2017), Nanami
- Tsugumomo (2017), Nago Eiko
- Katana Maidens ~ Toji No Miko (2018), Uchizako Ayumu
- Hanebado! (2018), Ayano Hanesaki
- Planet With (2018), Miu Inaba
- A Certain Magical Index III (2018), Xochitl
- Wataten!: An Angel Flew Down to Me (2019), Koyori Tanemura
- Girly Air Force (2019), Eagle
- The Demon Girl Next Door (2019), Ryōko Yoshida
- Tenka Hyakken ~Meiji-kan e Yōkoso!~ (2019), Kogarasumaru
- A Certain Scientific Railgun T (2020), Xochitl
- Blue Reflection Ray (2021), Miyako Shirakaba
- I'm Quitting Heroing (2022), Lili
- The Demon Girl Next Door Season 2 (2022), Ryōko Yoshida
- Atelier Ryza: Ever Darkness & the Secret Hideout (2023), Klaudia Valentz
- Reign of the Seven Spellblades (2023), Katie Aalto
- Kindergarten Wars (2027), Hana

=== OVA ===
- Locodol: Christmas Special (2015), Satoshi Mikazuki

=== ONA ===
- Pretty Guardian Sailor Moon Crystal (2015), Droid 2

=== Anime films ===
- Shirobako: The Movie (2020), Midori Imai
- Wataten!: An Angel Flew Down to Me: Precious Friends (2022), Koyori Tanemura

=== Video games ===
- Deception IV: Blood Ties (2015), Reina
- Fate/Grand Order (2017), Abigail Williams
- Xenoblade Chronicles 2 (2017), Nia
- Alice Gear Aegis (2018), Raiya Kaeruzaka
- Girls' Frontline (2018), HK P30 and SSG 3000
- Atelier Ryza: Ever Darkness & the Secret Hideout (2019), Klaudia Valentz
- Azur Lane (2019), HMS Swiftsure and Klaudia Valentz
- Grimms Notes (2019), Magic Mirror
- Touhou Spell Bubble (2020), Cirno
- Atelier Ryza 2: Lost Legends & the Secret Fairy (2020), Klaudia Valentz
- Arknights (2020), Mint
- A Certain Magical Index: Imaginary Fest (2021), Xochitl
- Umamusume: Pretty Derby (2021), Smart Falcon
- Artery Gear: Fusion (2022), Klaudia Valentz
- Xenoblade Chronicles 3 (2022), Queen Nia
- Atelier Ryza 3: Alchemist of the End & the Secret Key (2023), Klaudia Valentz
- Groove Coaster Future Performers (2025), GRV-1105 MEI
