= Nakanishi =

Nakanishi (written: 中西 or 仲西) is a Japanese surname. Notable people with the surname include:

- Akinori Nakanishi (born 1954), chief designer for Mitsubishi Motors
- Alan Nakanishi (born 1940), American politician
- Chieko Nakanishi (born 1966), Japanese former volleyball player
- Eisuke Nakanishi (born 1973), Japanese football player
- Etsuko Nakanishi (born 1977), Japanese drummer, Shonen Knife
- Haruka Nakanishi (中西 悠, born 1977), Japanese voice actress
- Hidetoshi Nakanishi (born 1958), Japanese judoka
- Hiroaki Nakanishi (1946–2021), CEO of Hitachi
- Kazuo Nakanishi (1922–2003), leader of the Yamaguchi-gumi yakuza syndicate
- Kazuyoshi Nakanishi (中西 一善), Japanese politician
- Kie Nakanishi (born 1995), Japanese badminton player
- Koji Nakanishi (born 1925), Japanese chemist
- Machiko Nakanishi (born 1976), Japanese athlete
- Manabu Nakanishi (born 1967), Japanese wrestler
- Maya Nakanishi (born 1985), Japanese paralympic athlete
- Michi Nakanishi (1913–1991), Japanese athlete
- Mitsuo Nakanishi (born 1948), Japanese sprint canoer
- Momoe Nakanishi (born 1980), Japanese wrestler
- Nobuaki Nakanishi, Japanese anime director
- Rei Nakanishi (born 1938), Japanese novelist and songwriter
- Sekisuke Nakanishi (1926–2025), Japanese politician
- Shigeru Nakanishi (born 1946), Japanese artist
- Shigetada Nakanishi (born 1942), Japanese scientist
- Susumu Nakanishi (born 1929), scholar of Japanese literature
- Tamaki Nakanishi (born 1976), Japanese voice actress
- Taeko Nakanishi (born 1931), Japanese voice actress
- Taku Nakanishi (中西 拓, born 1972), Japanese freestyle skier
- Tayuka Nakanishi, Japanese fashion designer
- Tetsuo Nakanishi (born 1969), Japanese football player
- Tomoya Nakanishi (中西 倫也, born 1994), Japanese football player
- Toshio Nakanishi (born 1956), Japanese musician and graphic designer
- Yuko Nakanishi (born 1981) Japanese swimmer
- Yousuke Nakanishi (born 1979), Japanese badminton player

== See also ==
- 8702 Nakanishi, a main-belt asteroid
