= Yuri Noguchi =

Japanese voice actress

- のぐち ゆり
- Born: December 24, 1992 (age 33); Saitama Prefecture, Japan
- Occupation: Voice actress
- Years active: 2014-present
- Agent: Aoni Production
- Notable work: World Trigger as Fumika Teruya; The Idolmaster Cinderella Girls as Shizuku Oikawa; Release the Spyce as Goe Ishikawa; Umamusume: Pretty Derby as Mejiro Palmer; Atelier Ryza as Reisalin Stout
- Height: 159 cm (5 ft 3 in)

Yuri Noguchi (のぐち ゆり, Noguchi Yuri; born December 24, 1992) is a Japanese voice actress from Saitama Prefecture, Japan. She is best known for the roles of Shizuku Oikawa in The Idolmaster Cinderella Girls video-game and anime series, and Reisalin Stout, the protagonist of the Atelier Ryza series of video games.

== Filmography ==
=== Anime ===
2014

- Chibi Maruko-chan (2014–2017) as Elementary school boy, boy, Haruko, passerby

2015

- The Idolmaster Cinderella Girls as Shizuku Oikawa
- World Trigger as Fumika Teruya, soldier, younger boy
- Ultimate Otaku Teacher as operator
- Case Closed as colleague (ep 789)
- Yuru Yuri San Hai! as Store woman (ep 9)
- Dragon Ball Super as Clerk (ep 71); Fairy (ep 27); Mouse (ep 74); Woman (ep 75)

2016

- Dragon Ball Super (2016–2017) as fairy, clerk, mouse, woman
- One Piece (2016–2019) as Tontatta, Kid Mink, Town Mink, Mink, maid
- Reikenzan as florist
- Sailor Moon Crystal as female student, clerk
- Magic-kyun! Renaissance as schoolgirl
- Kiss Him, Not Me as seller
- Tiger Mask W as pro wrestler girl, clerk

2017

- Kado: The Right Answer as National Security Agency colleague, journalist
- The Idolmaster Cinderella Girls Theater as Shizuku Oikawa

2018

- Sanrio Boys as girl
- GeGeGe no Kitarō (6th Series) as Masashi
- Release the Spyce as Goe Ishikawa

2020

- Nekopara as Cinnamon
- My Hero Academia as Chikuchi Togeike

2021

- Umamusume: Pretty Derby Season 2 as Mejiro Palmer
- D_Cide Traumerei the Animation as girl

2023

- Atelier Ryza: Ever Darkness & the Secret Hideout as Reisalin Stout

2024

- Jochum as PiHai

2027

- Witch and Mercenary as Isana Gihon

=== Video games ===
2014

- Toys Drive (2014–2015) as Taeko Hōjō, Hinata Sakai, Green Mistress
- Bakumatsu Maid Doll Knight as Tokugawa Munakatsu, Otose

2015

- Closers as Irina Shinoda
- Idolmaster Cinderella Girls as Shizuku Oikawa
- Idolmaster Cinderella Girls Starlight Stage as Shizuku Oikawa
- Kemono Friends as Narwhal, Nilgai, Golden Lion Tamarin
- Sangoku Taisen Smash!

2016

- Monmusu Harem as Tensei
- Persona 5
- World End Eclipse as Undine

2017

- Xenoblade Chronicles 2 as Patroka

2019

- Atelier Ryza: Ever Darkness & the Secret Hideout as Reisalin Stout
- Release the Spyce as Goe Ishikawa

2020

- Atelier Ryza 2: Lost Legends & the Secret Fairy as Reisalin Stout
- Vivid Army as Ciel

2021

- Umamusume: Pretty Derby as Mejiro Palmer
- Animae Archae as Reiha, Hayate

2022

- Azur Lane as Reisalin Stout

2023

- Atelier Ryza 3: Alchemist of the End & Secret Key as Reisalin Stout

2025

- Groove Coaster Future Performers as Kirara Oruka
