= Haruka Terui =

Japanese voice actress

- 照井 春佳
- Born: March 7, 1987 (age 39); Iwate Prefecture, Japan
- Occupation: Voice actress
- Years active: 2009–present
- Agent: Aoni Production
- Notable work: Yuki Yuna Is a Hero as Yuna Yuki; Engaged to the Unidentified as Kobeni Yonomori; The Idolmaster Cinderella Girls as Momoka Sakurai; Umamusume: Pretty Derby as Zenno Rob Roy
- Height: 158 cm (5 ft 2 in)
- Spouse: Tomoya Hirata (m. 2021)

Haruka Terui (照井 春佳, Terui Haruka; born March 7, 1987) is a Japanese voice actress. She is affiliated with Aoni Production.

She is best known for her roles in Engaged to the Unidentified (Kobeni Yunomori), Yuki Yuna Is a Hero (Yuna Yuuki), The Idolmaster Cinderella Girls (Momoka Sakurai). and Umamusume: Pretty Derby (Zenno Rob Roy).

On March 3, 2021, it was announced that Terui married Go player Tomoya Hirata.

== Filmography ==
=== Anime series ===
- Gakkatsu! (2012), Inaba, Kimoto
- Aikatsu! (2013), Yū Hattori
- Fantasista Doll (2013), Amsterdam; Champa
- Kyōsōgiga (2013), Child; Four Devas Member; School Girl
- Ao Haru Ride (2014), School Girl, Female Customer
- Engaged to the Unidentified (2014), Kobeni Yonomori
- Haikyu!! (2014), Yūko
- Yuki Yuna Is a Hero (2014), Yūna Yūki
- Chaos Dragon (2015), Meryll
- The Idolmaster Cinderella Girls 2nd Season (2015), Momoka Sakurai
- Brave Witches (2016), Georgette Lemare
- Grimgar of Fantasy and Ash (2016), Shihoru
- Kemono Friends (2017) Hippopotamus (ep. 1, 3, 12), Aardwolf (ep. 1, 12)
- Schoogirl Strikers Animation Channel (2017), Koori Origami
- Yuki Yuna Is a Hero: Washio Sumi Chapter (2017), Yūna Yūki
- Yuki Yuna Is a Hero: Hero Chapter (2017), Yūna Yūki
- Gundam Build Divers (2018), Sarah
- Persona 5: The Animation (2018), Chihaya Mifune (replacing Miyu Matsuki)
- The Day I Became a God (2020), Hikari Jingūji
- Yashahime: Princess Half-Demon (2020), Mei Higurashi
- Buddy Daddies (2023), Anna Hanyu
- Yuki Yuna Is a Hero: The Great Mankai Chapter (2021), Yūna Yūki & Yūna Takashima
- Shenmue (2022), Shenhua
- The Idolmaster Cinderella Girls U149 (2023), Momoka Sakurai
- Atelier Ryza: Ever Darkness & the Secret Hideout (2023), Lila Decyrus
- Frieren: Beyond Journey's End (2024), Sense
- Wandance (2025), Aika Naitō
- The Reincarnated Elf Left on a Journey to Master His Magic (2027), Rahab

=== Original video animations ===
- Dragon Ball: Episode of Bardock (2011), Villager
- Senjō no Valkyria 3: Taga Tame no Jūsō (2011), Clarissa Callaghan
- A Channel + Smile (2012), Friend B
- Ichigeki Sacchu!! HoiHoi-san Legacy (2013), Mayu Dōmeki

=== Web anime ===
- Kyōsōgiga Dainidan (2013), child A; Four Devas Member
- Pretty Guardian Sailor Moon Crystal (2015), Club Member; Girl

=== Anime films ===
- Tamako Love Story (2014), 2nd Year Baton Club Member
- The Tunnel to Summer, the Exit of Goodbyes (2022), Hanamoto-sensei

=== Video games ===
- Valkyria Chronicles III (2011), Gisele Fleming, Clarissa Callaghan
- Deception IV: Blood Ties (2014), Telma Mueller
- Schoogirl Strikers (2014), Koori Origami
- Kemono Friends (2015), Crested Ibis, Moose, Aardwolf, Nine-Tailed Fox, Indian Elephant, Southern Sea Otter.
- Yuki Yuna Is a Hero (2017), Yūna Yūki, Yūna Takashima, Yūna Akamine, Yūna Lilienthal Fuyō
- Arknights (2019), Sussurro
- Shenmue III (2019), Shenhua Ling
- Atelier Ryza: Ever Darkness & the Secret Hideout (2019), Lila Decyrus
- Kemono Friends 3, Hippopotamus
- Persona 5 Royal (2019), Chihaya Mifune, Rumi
- TOUHOU Spell Bubble (2020), Yuyuko Saigyouji
- Atelier Ryza 2: Lost Legends & the Secret Fairy (2020), Lila Decyrus
- Guardian Tales (2020), Dancing Archer Tinia
- Counter:Side (2021), Lumi
- Umamusume: Pretty Derby (2021), Zenno Rob Roy
- Artery Gear: Fusion (2022), Lila Decyrus
- Xenoblade Chronicles 3 (2022), Shania
- Azur Lane (2022), Lila Decyrus
- Atelier Ryza 3: Alchemist of the End & the Secret Key (2023), Lila Decyrus
- Honkai: Star Rail (2023), Lynx Landau
- Card-En-Ciel (2024), Grazie
