= List of Genesis of Aquarion episodes =

This is a list of episodes of the Genesis of Aquarion anime series, produced by studio Satelight and directed by Shoji Kawamori with music compositions by Yoko Kanno. The series was broadcast in Japan on TV Tokyo between April 4, 2005, and September 26, 2005, and is available online in English on Funimation Channel.

Two pieces of music were used as opening themes, "Genesis of Aquarion" (創聖のアクエリオン, Sōsei no Aquarion) for the first seventeen episodes and "Go Tight!" for episode eighteen onwards, performed by AKINO. Three pieces of music were used as ending themes, "Omna Magni" (オムナ マグニ; "I Can Fly"), by Yui Makino, "Kōya no Heath" (荒野のヒース; "The Heath of the Wasteland"), by AKINO and "Celiane" by Gabriela Robin.

== Episode list ==
No.	Title	Original release date	English release date
1	"Memories of Heavenly Wings"; Transliteration: "Tenshi no Kioku" (Japanese: 天翅の記憶)	April 4, 2005	April 9, 2009
12,000 years after their last clash with mankind, the Shadow Angels return to attack the human cities and kidnap its inhabitants. Looking for the reincarnation of Apollonius, a Shadow Angel who turned against his own kind to protect the humans, Silvia de Alisia has an encounter with Apollo, a reckless and animalistic orphan who somehow manages to unlock the true potential of mankind's greatest weapon, the Mechanical Angel Aquarion.
2	"Beast of Darkness"; Transliteration: "Yami no Kemono" (Japanese: 闇の獣)	April 11, 2005	April 28, 2009
After the last battle, Apollo is brought against his will to the headquarters of DEAVA, the organization responsible to confront the Shadow Angels with Aquarion. While wondering if Apollo is actually the reincarnation of Apollonius, the members of DEAVA are attacked by the Holy Angel Toma, one of the Shadow Angels who also wants to confirm if it is true.
3	"Element School"; Transliteration: "Eremento Sukūru" (Japanese: エレメントスクール)	April 18, 2005	April 29, 2009
Determined to rescue his friend Baron who was captured by the Shadow Angels, Apollo starts attending DEAVA's school for Elements. He has a hard time trying to get along with his classmates, especially Silvia, until the Shadow Angels launch another attack.
4	"Barefoot Warrior"; Transliteration: "Hadashi no Senshi" (Japanese: はだしの戦士)	April 25, 2005	April 30, 2009
Toma exposes to the other fellow Shadow Angels his plan to make use of Aquarion to restore the Tree of Life. Meanwhile, Gen Fudo, the commander of DEAVA forces, holds a special training session for the Elements that proves itself useful to them against their next enemy.
5	"King of the Underground Labyrinth"; Transliteration: "Chika Meikyū no Ō" (Japanese: 地下迷宮の王)	May 2, 2005	May 1, 2009
Apollo decides to flee the academy to look for Baron himself. Fudo assembles the other Elements to bring him back, until they must once again join forces to confront another enemy attack.
6	"To the Other Side of Emotions"; Transliteration: "Omoi Kanata e" (Japanese: 想い彼方へ)	May 9, 2005	May 4, 2009
Toma dispatches a new Cherubim able to dodge all of Aquarion's attacks until Apollo manages to bring forth Solar Aquarion's special attack that pursues the enemy wherever it runs.
7	"Knight of the Crimson Rose"; Transliteration: "Shinku no Bara no Kishi" (Japanese: 深紅の薔薇の騎士)	May 16, 2005	May 5, 2009
Silvia's older brother Sirius de Alisia always believed he was the reincarnation of Apollonius, but his jealousy grows as more indicts about Apollo being so appear and Toma decides to make use of it in his next plan against the elements.
8	"The First Merge"; Transliteration: "Hajimete no Gattai" (Japanese: はじめてのがったい)	May 16, 2005	May 5, 2009
Element Tsugumi Rosenmeier was always shunned for not being able to control her powers, but she finally manages to put it to good use in her first time piloting Aquarion.
9	"The Path to Dreams"; Transliteration: "Yume no Kayohiji" (Japanese: 夢のかよひじ)	June 30, 2005	May 7, 2009
The Shadow Angels use one of their agents to put children around the world to sleep endlessly while it drains their prana for them, to face the new threat, the Elements are put to sleep to confront the enemy in the dream world where it resides.
10	"Stars in the Sky, Flowers on the Ground"; Transliteration: "Sora ni Hoshi, Chi ni Hana" (Japanese: 空に星、地に花)	June 6, 2005	May 8, 2009
The Warrior Angel Moroha, another of the Shadow Angels, confronts Aquarion and easily defeats it, but leaves before dealing the killing blow as he knows Toma has other plans for it. To get their revenge on him for hurting Silvia, Apollo and Sirius put aside their differences and join forces against Moroha when he attacks again.
11	"Happiness at the Bottom of the Lake"; Transliteration: "Suitei no Shiawase" (Japanese: 水底のしあわせ)	June 13, 2005	May 11, 2009
Hong "Reika" Lihua blames herself for the event that put her and Sirius' friend Glen Anderson in a coma. Her Element powers, able to bring misfortune to her and those close to her, causes her a lot of grief, until she learns to make good use of them in their following battle.
12	"The Time of Amber"; Transliteration: "Kohaku no Toki" (Japanese: 琥珀の時)	June 20, 2005	May 12, 2009
The researchers at DEAVA recover a mysterious feather dated from 12,000 years before. After learning of it, Apollo and Silvia sneak into the lab where the feather is and upon touching it, they have visions of the past involving Apollonius and his human lover Celiane.
13	"A 12,000 Year-Old Love Letter"; Transliteration: "Ichimannisen-nen no Rabu Retā" (Japanese: 一万二千年のラブレター)	June 27, 2005	May 13, 2009
Toma and his partner, the Music Angel Otoha, launch an attack on DEAVA together to retrieve the feather. During the battle, Apollo manages to finally re-encounter Baron under Toma's mercy, just to witness his friend's death when the cage he is imprisoned explodes, much to his despair.
14	"Shining Shadows"; Transliteration: "Hikaru Kage" (Japanese: 光る影)	July 4, 2005	May 14, 2009
The Shadow Angels send an invisible enemy that proves himself more than a match for the Elements. Apollo joins the fight, but he and his vector vanishes and Silvia starts realizing her feelings for him and uses them to bring him back.
15	"Aquarion's First Love"; Transliteration: "Hatsuren no Akuerion" (Japanese: 初恋のアクエリオン)	July 11, 2005	May 15, 2009
Element Pierre Vieira enters in a dangerous state after he learns that his former girlfriend Esperanza is about to get married, thus he is temporarily forbidden to pilot Aquarion. Soon after, the Shadow Angels launch an attack on Pierre's hometown and upon learning that his comrades are having a hard time fighting to protect it, he regains his composure and joins the fight to protect his family and friends.
16	"Black Mirror"; Transliteration: "Kuroi Kagami" (Japanese: 黒い鏡)	July 18, 2005	May 18, 2009
The other Elements are suspicious that their comrade Rena Rune is actually a vampire, and once again Toma decides to take advantage of the situation in a ploy against them.
17	"Merge to Eat"; Transliteration: "Tabetakute Gatttai" (Japanese: 食べたくて合体)	July 25, 2005	May 19, 2009
The Shadow Angels launch a special microbe that devours all of DEAVA's food supply. After a week of hunger and under enemy siege, Silvia, Tsugumi and Reika decide to fight back when they realize that not out of concern for their lives, but for their body shapes as well.
18	"Cosplay of the Soul"; Transliteration: "Tamashii no Kosupureiyā" (Japanese: 魂のコスプレイヤー)	August 1, 2005	May 20, 2009
Fudo holds an exercise with the Elements impersonating each other with hilarious consequences. Soon an enemy mimicking Aquarion's appearance and powers appears, and still under influence of the exercise, they have a hard time fighting as they used to until they finally learn to bring forth the true power of their own personalities.
19	"Mischief Without Malice"; Transliteration: "Kegarenaki Itazura" (Japanese: けがれなき悪戯)	August 8, 2005	May 21, 2009
The Elements are drawn into a strange illusionary world and while trying to escape from it, Sirius is approached by Toma who claims he hides his true self from the others, while Apollo is confronted with his feelings over Baron's loss.
20	"Sound of an Angel's Feather"; Transliteration: "Tenshi no Shion" (Japanese: 天翅の翅音)	August 15, 2005	May 22, 2009
The Child Angel Futaba, the youngest among the Shadow Angels, launches an attack on Aquarion, only to be captured by the military. The Elements and the Shadow Angels hear in their minds Futaba's screams as the military scientists experiment on him, much to Toma's anger.
21	"Crimson Path"; Transliteration: "Akai Michi" (Japanese: 紅い道)	August 22, 2005	July 15, 2009
During Toma's next attack, he exposes to the other elements the truth about Silvia and Sirius' origins. Taking advantage of their shock over his revelation, Toma manages to convince Sirius to abandon his friends and join the Shadow Angels' side.
22	"Wings Unseen"; Transliteration: "Mienai Tsubasa" (Japanese: 見えない翼)	August 29, 2005	July 15, 2009
The Elements have a hard time trying to cope with Sirius' defection, but it does not take long for him to appear before them again, now as an enemy.
23	"Fleeting Wings"; Transliteration: "Tsubasa, Hakanaku" (Japanese: 翼、儚く)	September 5, 2005	July 15, 2009
The Elements' fight against Sirius is interrupted by the military, who dispatches a new fighting machine modeled on Aquarion piloted by Glen, who recovered by having some of Futaba's feathers implanted on him. Sirius tries to convince Silvia to abandon the humans and join the Shadow Angels just like he did, but Apollo intervenes to dissuade her.
24	"Heaven's Gate"; Transliteration: "Tenkū no Gēto" (Japanese: 天空のゲート)	September 12, 2005	July 15, 2009
A mysterious snow covers the entire globe, turning people into plants. Silvia and Apollo have some quality time together until they are interrupted by Sirius who kidnaps Silvia. The snow starts infiltrating the DEAVA base, forcing the Elements to board Aquarion and fight back.
25	"Final Battle! Atlandia"; Transliteration: "Kessen!! Atorandia" (Japanese: 決戦!!アトランディア)	September 19, 2005	July 15, 2009
Both Aquarion and the military manage to reach the Shadow Angels' base at Atlantis. Toma manages to restrain Aquarion and reveals the truth about the reincarnations of Apollonius and Celiane, before trying to kill both Silvia and Sirius.
26	"The Day the World Begins"; Transliteration: "Sekai no Hajimari no Hi" (Japanese: 世界のはじまりの日)	September 26, 2005	July 15, 2009
Toma's plan to renew the Tree of Life using Aquarion fails. When the tree starts collapsing, the whole world starts tearing itself apart. Apollo, Sirius and Toma board Aquarion and sacrifice themselves to save the planet, but not before Apollo declares his love for Silvia, promising to reunite with her in 12,000 years.
