= Atelier Ryza 3: Alchemist of the End & the Secret Key =

2023 role-playing game

- Developer: Gust
- Publisher: Koei Tecmo
- Director: Shinichi Abiko
- Producer: Junzo Hosoi
- Designers: Shinichi Abiko; Taiki Fukui
- Programmers: Katsuto Kawauchi; Kenzo Kobori
- Artist: Toridamono
- Writers: Yashichiro Takahashi; Shinichi Yoshiike; Genki Tomimatsu; Sotaro Kusakawa
- Composers: Kazuki Yanagawa; Kosuke Mizukami; Reo Uratani; Yuki Matsumura; Masako Otsuka; Asami Mitake
- Series: Atelier
- Platforms: Nintendo Switch; Nintendo Switch 2; PlayStation 4; PlayStation 5; Microsoft Windows
- Release: Switch, PS4, PS5: JP: March 23, 2023; NA: March 24, 2023; EU: March 24, 2023; Microsoft Windows: WW: March 24, 2023; Switch 2: WW: November 13, 2025
- Genre: Role-playing
- Mode: Single-player

Atelier Ryza 3: Alchemist of the End & the Secret Key (Note: Japanese: ライザのアトリエ３ ～終わりの錬金術士と秘密の鍵～, Hepburn: Raiza no Atorie 3: Owari no Renkinjutsushi to Himitsu no Kagi) is a role-playing video game developed by Gust. It is the twenty-fourth main entry in the Atelier series, the third and final game of the Secret storyline, featuring the same protagonist from the two previous installments and celebrating the 25th anniversary of the franchise.

The game was released on 23 March 2023 in Japan for PlayStation 4, PlayStation 5 and Nintendo Switch, with an English subtitled version released on March 24, 2023 in Europe and North America alongside a Microsoft Windows version for all three regions.

An updated version of the game with additional playable characters and content, titled Atelier Ryza 3: Alchemist of the End & the Secret Key DX, was released on November 13, 2025 on the same platforms, also including Nintendo Switch 2 as part of the Atelier Ryza Secret Trilogy Deluxe Pack.

== Gameplay ==
Atelier Ryza 3 follows the same gameplay from previous installments. Players move around the map to collect materials from the environment and defeated monsters that Ryza can use as ingredients to synthesize items with her alchemy to improve the party's equipment and accomplish missions, while the combat system incorporates elements from both turn-based and real-time RPGs. A new, exclusive concept is the introduction of magic keys that are obtained through the game. These keys can be used to unlock new options in both synthesize and combat, and to access new areas for exploration. For the first time in the series, the environment is composed of a single map formed by interconnected areas instead of smaller areas that need to be loaded with every transition.

== Plot ==
=== Characters ===
The party is composed of 11 characters. Aside from the main protagonist Reisalin "Ryza" Stout (Yuri Noguchi), returning playable characters from the first two games include Ryza's close friends Tao Mongarten (Junta Terashima), Lent Marslink (Takuma Terashima) and Klaudia Valentz (Hitomi Owada), Ryza's alchemy teacher Empel Vollmer (Hirofumi Nojima), Empel's partner Lila Decyrus (Haruka Terui) and Tao's pupil Patricia Abelheim (Naomi Ōzora). Bos Brunnen (Yohei Azakami), another friend of Ryza's and a secondary character from both games also returns, now as a playable character, along three new playable characters, Federica Lamberti (Sumire Morohoshi), an artisan, Dian Farell (Yudai Mino), a young warrior and Kala Ideas (Hina Yōmiya), a legendary warrior from the Oren race. The DX version of the game features three additional player characters, Serri Glaus (Yukiyo Fujii) and Clifford Diswell (Eiji Takemoto), returning from the second game and Kilo Shiness (Shiori Mikami), another secondary character from the first game who became playable in the DX version.

=== Story ===
One year after her trip to the capital, Reisalin "Ryza" Stout, assisted by her friends Tao Mongarten and Bos Brunnen who were taking some vacation from their studies rescue some villagers from unknown monsters. The monsters come from a group of strange islands that mysteriously appeared nearby, known as the "Kark Islands" which are also interfering with the mechanism that keeps Kurken Island stable. While preparing some medicine to treat the wounded, Ryza hears a voice in her head who instructs her to synthetize a key that she has never seen before. Reuniting with her friends Klaudia Valentz and Lent Marslink who attend to her request for help, Ryza explores the Kark Islands where she finds a strange door and the voice talks to her again, instructing her to look for a way to open it in order to reach the "Code of the Universe". To investigate more about the islands and the keys, Ryza, Tao, Bos, Lent and Klaudia travel the Clerias region along Federica Lamberti, the Deputy Leader of Sardonica's Craftsman Union. After helping the local guilds settle a dispute between them, Ryza manages to create a new key and returns to the Kark Isles to test it, accompanied by Federica who also joins the party.

Ryza opens the door which leads to a sealed room containing some texts about dragons. Knowing that their teachers Empel Vollmer and Lila Decyrus are researching about dragon related legends, the party travels to the Nemed region in search for them where they meet Dian Farell, a local warrior from the village of Faurre and learn from him that Empel and Lila are imprisoned for wandering into forbidden territory, also reuniting with Tao's pupil Patricia Abelheim who was looking for Tao in order to inform him that he passed the test to join the Royal Academy. While investigating the local ruins, Ryza develops a special recipe to improve the village's economy, which she uses to convince the chief to release the duo. Inside the ruins, the reunited party discovers a gate to the Underworld, where they meet a tribe of Oren led by Kala Ideas who reveals that the gates are created when elder dragons use their powers to travel back and forth between both worlds, rendering Empel and Lila's quest to close all gates impossible. Kala also reveals that the Code of the Universe is an interdimensional city inhabited by alchemists from the "Age of Gods" who invade other worlds for the sake of their research and are also responsible for the Philuscha infestation that ravages the Underworld. Accompanied by Kala, the party travels the world again looking for more clues about the Code of the Universe and returns to the Underworld, where they reunite with Kilo and Fi. In the occasion, Bos declares his love for Kilo and proposes to her.

After completing her research, Ryza opens the door again, leading the party to the Code, where they find the city deserted, abandoned by its inhabitants who fled to other worlds, but the machine that overlooks the city is still functioning, luring talented alchemists in order to absorb them and obtain their knowledge. The party destroys the machine and Ryza uses her key to shut down the Code of the Universe for good, destroying Kark Isles in the process. Back to Kurken Island, Ryza taps into the Dragon Vein that runs under the machinery keeping the island afloat to ensure that it never runs out of power again and the party disbands, the members following their own, separate ways: Federica returns to Sardonica and is nominated the Union Leader; Kala returns to the Underworld to help rebuild it; Empel and Lila embark on a new quest, this time to check if the gates they closed were somehow afflicted by the Code of Universe's destruction; Lent travels as a knight errant again, now accompanied by Dian; Tao decides to become a researcher at the Royal Academy and live in the capital with Patricia; Bos continues his preparations to carry on his family business; Klaudia resumes her work as a merchant and Ryza begins a new journey alone in search for an apprentice.

== Reception ==
Reception

Aggregate score
Aggregator	Score
Metacritic	NS: 84/100; PC: 86/100; PS5: 83/100

Review scores
Publication	Score
Famitsu	34/40
Nintendo Life	9/10
RPGamer	4/5

Upon release, Atelier Ryza 3 received "generally favorable" reviews on all platforms, according to review aggregator Metacritic.

PJ O'Reilly wrote for Nintendo Life that the game is so far the best in the Atelier series: "Despite some issues with small text, no English dub and a little fussiness in how information is relayed", "Atelier Ryza 3: Alchemist of the End & the Secret Key ends Ryza's three-game run on a high note, serving up a heady mix of exploration, crafting and combat that benefits greatly from a narrative arc that's had time to develop and grow."

Jean-Karlo Lemus wrote for Anime News Network and gave a B+, explaining "that's a purely analytical score based on how I feel about the mechanics as a greater whole: battles are finicky, getting new recipes is a bit of a grind, and the keys feel almost superfluous. But the experience of this game is one to treasure, especially if you've got the added experience of having played Ryza's other two games. This is a lovely little game about a young woman and her friends making their last farewells to their childhood, stepping out into the world as adults."

On March 31, 2023, Koei Tecmo announced total worldwide sales for Atelier Ryza 3 had surpassed 290,000 units. On April 27, 2023, Koei Tecmo announced that Atelier Ryza 3's sales had surpassed 300,000 units, making it the fastest selling game in the Secret series. On June 26, 2023, Koei Tecmo announced that the Atelier Ryza series has sold over two million units.
