= Yugo Takahashi =

Japanese voice actor

Yugo Takahashi (高橋 裕吾, Takahashi Yūgo; born in Tokyo, Japan) is a Japanese voice actor affiliated with Aoni Production.

== Voice Acting ==
=== Voice roles ===
- Stellvia of the Universe (2003 TV series), Tony Omaezaki
- Onegai Twins (2003 TV series), Uehera
- Kidou Senshi Gundam SEED Destiny (2004 TV series), Nishizawa
- My-HiME (2004 TV series), Takumi Tokiha
- My-Otome (2005 TV series), Takumi Tokiha

=== Episodic characters in ===
- Beyblade
- Black Cat
- Bobobo-bo Bo-bobo
- Chobits
- Kimi ga Nozomu Eien
- Samurai Gun
- Scrapped Princess
