= The Daily Life of a Part-time Torturer =

Japanese manga series

- First tankōbon volume cover

拷問バイトくんの日常 (Gōmon Baito-kun no Nichijō)
- Genre: Comedy
- Manga
- Written by: Yawora Tsugumi
- Published by: Hakusensha
- Imprint: Young Animal Comics
- Magazine: Manga Park; Young Animal Web
- Original run: December 18, 2022 – present
- Volumes: 8
- Anime television series
- Directed by: Fumitoshi Oizaki
- Written by: Hitomi Amamiya
- Music by: Kenji Fujisawa
- Studio: Diomedéa
- Licensed by: Crunchyroll: SEA: Medialink
- Original network: Tokyo MX, BS Asahi, TVA, ytv
- Original run: January 4, 2026 – March 23, 2026
- Episodes: 12
- icon

The Daily Life of a Part-time Torturer (拷問バイトくんの日常, Gōmon Baito-kun no Nichijō; lit. 'The Everyday Life of Torture Part-Time Workers') is a Japanese manga series written and illustrated by Yawora Tsugumi. It began serialization on Hakusensha's Manga Park and Young Animal Web services in December 2022. It has been compiled into eight volumes as of June 2026. An anime television series adaptation produced by Diomedéa aired from January to March 2026.

== Plot ==
The series takes place in a world where torture and killing are legal, and companies specialize in doing them. It follows Sero, a part-time worker at one such company, along with his coworkers Siu, Mike, and Hugh.

== Characters ==
Sero (セロ, Sero)
Voiced by: Junya Enoki (PV), Shun'ichi Toki (anime)
Siu (シウ, Shū)
Voiced by: Hiroshi Kamiya (PV), Takuma Terashima (anime)
Mike (ミケ, Mike)
Voiced by: Takuma Nagatsuka (anime)
Hugh (ヒュー, Hyū)
Voiced by: Yōhei Azakami (anime)
Hera (ヘラ, Hera)
Voiced by: Kishō Taniyama (anime)
Noe (ノエ)
Voiced by: Rikuya Yasuda (anime)
Berta (ベルタ, Beruta)
Voiced by: Nozomi Yamamoto (anime)
Leu (レウ)
Voiced by: Kozue Yūki (anime)
Nero (ネロ)
Voiced by: Satsuki Hatori (anime)
Von (フォン, Fon)
Voiced by: Tomohiro Ōno (anime)

== Media ==
=== Manga ===
Written and illustrated by Yawora Tsugumi, The Daily Life of a Part-time Torturer began serialization on Hakusensha's Manga Park and Young Animal Web services on December 18, 2022. Its chapters have been compiled into eight tankōbon volumes as of June 2026.

No.	Release date	ISBN
1	April 28, 2023	978-4-592-16532-3
2	August 29, 2023	978-4-592-16533-0
3	December 27, 2023	978-4-592-16534-7
4	June 28, 2024	978-4-592-16535-4
5	December 26, 2024	978-4-592-16543-9; 978-4-592-16804-1 (SE)
6	June 27, 2025	978-4-592-16544-6
7	December 25, 2025	978-4-592-16545-3; 978-4-592-16805-8 (SE)
8	June 29, 2026	9784592166900

=== Anime ===
An anime television series adaptation was announced on June 20, 2025. It is produced by Diomedéa and directed by Fumitoshi Oizaki, with series composition handled by Hitomi Amamiya, characters designed by Sake Shibuya, and music composed by Kenji Fujisawa. The series aired from January 5 to March 23, 2026, on Tokyo MX and other networks. (Note: Tokyo MX listed the series premiere on January 4 at 24:30, which is effectively January 5 at 12:30 a.m. JST.) The opening theme song is "GO GO PARADISE!!", performed by Granrodeo, while the ending theme song is "Ashita Tenki ni Naare", performed by Takuma Terashima. Crunchyroll is streaming the series. Medialink licensed the series in Southeast Asia and Oceania (except Australia and New Zealand) for streaming on Ani-One Asia's YouTube channel.

==== Episodes ====
No.	Title	Directed by	Written by	Storyboarded by	Original release date
1	"Part-Time Job: Day 1"; Transliteration: "Baito 1 Nichi-me" (Japanese: バイト1日目)	Ageha Kochōran	Hitomi Amamiya	Fumitoshi Oizaki	January 5, 2026
In an alternate Japan torture and murder are legal activities and there are numerous companies specialising in such services. Cero is a part time employee of the Spirytus Company where he is highly rated as the specialist torturer Comet. His coworker, Shiu, is rated as the best torturer in the country, Supernova. They visit their friend Belta, who owns a torture implement shop. Shiu has a fondness for whips Cero finds creepy, whereas Belta is frustrated Cero prefers basic tools and never experiments with anything new. Spirytus hires Mikke as a trainee and at first Cero and Shui doubt he will last long, but Cero is soon impressed with his enthusiasm and skill in mental manipulation. Mikke reveals the high pay and short workday leave him time to write psychological horror novels. Next, Spirytus hires a nervous young man named Hugh who happens to have a blood phobia, so he develops skills in water-based torture and breaking bones. He eventually admits he hides his face behind a scarf because he is inhumanly beautiful, but it often attracts negative attention so he deliberately got a job where he could work alone.
2	"Part-Time Job: Day 2"; Transliteration: "Baito 2 Nichi-me" (Japanese: バイト2日目)	Ageha Kochōran	Hitomi Amamiya	Fumitoshi Oizaki	January 12, 2026
Mikke and Hugh both fail to extract information from their latest victims. Shiu suggests tutoring them, surprising Cero since back during his training Shiu would have punished him instead. Hugh learns being beautiful can be an asset as the contradiction of beauty with torture makes pain more effective. Mikke learns to spot when victims are lying even if they have already been tortured. Cero and Shiu decide to come up with embarrassing torturer nicknames for them, like their instructors once did when calling them Comet and Supernova. Shiu summons Cero for an emergency, but it turns out he is with his young daughters, twins Leu and Nero, and demands Cero win them toys from arcade games, which Shiu is bad at playing. Both girls like Cero so Shiu demands Cero start attending playdates. Hugh discusses with Mikke the ways their lives have improved since they began torturing people. Hugh's parents are even proud of him for wanting to take an Advanced Torture class at university. For completing ten tortures by himself Mikke buys Hugh his first torture device, a kitty shaped watering can for his water torture. After a late night drinking party Cero is happy they finally have apprentices that didn't quit after the first day.
3	"Part-Time Job: Day 3"; Transliteration: "Baito 3 Nichi-me" (Japanese: バイト3日目)	Ageha Kochōran	Hitomi Amamiya	Keizō Kusakawa	January 19, 2026
Spirytus' cross-dressing president Hela explains Spirytus only accepts jobs torturing criminals and never innocent people. Mikke asks why he cross dresses so Hela claims his beauty would be wasted dressing like a man. Cero frequently clashes with manager Noe. Shiu explains Hela took Noe in as a homeless orphan, so while he avoids torture Noe works at Spirytus to help Hela. Noe doubts he will ever get along with Cero but Hela assures him only people close to each other fight so often. Cero tries to get along with Noe, but they soon fight again, forcing Hela and Shiu to intervene. Shiu recalls when Cero first started at Spirytus and showed some promise, Shiu had him memorise the torturer's handbook in only two days. When Cero got his torturer licence on the first try Shiu rewarded him by making him his official apprentice. Cero takes a lot of time off without explanation. Mikke and Hugh worry he is planning to quit so they make sure to be nice to him when he returns. Shiu also awkwardly tries to be nice, which is terrifying. Cero explains he took time off to get his Instructor License, so now he can teach them advanced techniques.
4	"Part-Time Job: Day 4"; Transliteration: "Baito 4 Nichi-me" (Japanese: バイト4日目)	Ageha Kochōran	Taruto Akamaki	Kabuto Kuwagata	January 26, 2026
Cero offers Hugh and Mikke a Korokke case; industry slang for when it doesn't matter if the victim dies. They do so well they impress Fon, the Spirytus Ragman, whose job it is to professionally erase torture victims as though they never existed. Mikke is certain Spirytus is haunted. Hela decides they will all stay overnight in case the ghost is actually a spy. The ghost turns out to be a cat with kittens being disturbed by two spies in the air ducts, whom Shiu and Cero quickly dispose of. Paranoid about spies, Hugh and Mikke capture a suspicious teenager, but he turns out to be Cero's brother Luc. Luc is upset Cero has been spending less time at home lately and is confused why Cero chose such an unpleasant career. Shiu explains Cero's work extracting information has saved many innocent lives and put many criminals in prison. Cero worries when Luc becomes obsessed with his work. Shiu develops a fever and tries to continue working, forcing Cero to knock him out and take him home where Leu and Nero are also sick. Cero summons Hugh and Mikke as nurses. Shiu unexpectedly thanks everyone for helping when he needed it. However, the next day he beats up Cero for daring to knock him out.
5	"Part-Time Job: Day 5"; Transliteration: "Baito 5 Nichi-me" (Japanese: バイト5日目)	Ageha Kochōran	Usagi Usaki	Fumitoshi Oizaki	February 2, 2026
While studying Advanced Torture at university Hugh asks everyone at Spirytus to help him write a report, so they turn Hugh's textbook into a torture quiz. His report ends up winning a national award. Noe can't understand why Hela and Shiu like Cero so much, or why he feels inferior to him. Cero assures him not everyone is made to be a torturer and Noe is perfect for the job he currently has. Hugh and Mikke are curious if Cero was tempted to just kill a victim for their crimes. Cero assures them extracting information is too important, though some of the worst criminals did die in the end, which always annoys Noe. Spirytus take Leu and Nero to the beach followed by fireworks. Four important torture targets come in, so Shiu, Cero, Hugh and Mikke are forced to take one each. All four claim their gang boss is named Sakoru, a sure sign they agreed a fake name beforehand. Hugh and Mikke return to try advanced torture, while Shiu and Cero reveal they already extracted the real boss' name, they just wanted to give Hugh and Mikke extra practise. Hugh and Mikke end up working together to get the real name, but Cero and Shiu claim it doesn't matter as long as they got it, proving how valuable their skills have become.
6	"Part-Time Job: Day 6"; Transliteration: "Baito 6 Nichi-me" (Japanese: バイト6日目)	Ageha Kochōran	Usagi Usaki	Keizō Kusakawa	February 9, 2026
Mikke writes a book based on Shiu and Cero. Shortly after he meets Spirytus' cleaner Rische. Cero wonders if Rische has a crush on Mikke, but Mikke rejects the idea as he has three interfering older sisters. Rische reveals she read his book but is disappointed Mikke is a man and not a woman. Despite this they meet several times for shared interests. Mikke explains he can't write full time as torture is what inspires his writing. Rische invites him to see her cleaning crime scenes as inspiration for another book. An assassin named Manika visits Spirytus asking to kill Cero's latest torture target Doppel, who has contracts for both torture and kill. Cero reveals Manika is his ex. It is obvious to Mikke Manika is still attracted to Cero. She claims what broke them up was Shiu. At the time she was unaware how attached Cero was to torture, so when she got angry and criticised his torturer career Cero broke up with her. She asks if they can reconcile, then runs away when Cero refuses as he values his career over dating. Noe plans to make a website for Spirytus as they are overworked and need to attract new trainees. He takes excellent photos but his interviews with Cero, Shiu, Hugh and Mikke are useless for attracting new talent. Hela is pleased Noe is getting on with everyone.
7	"Part-Time Job: Day 7"; Transliteration: "Baito 7 Nichi-me" (Japanese: バイト7日目)	Kabuto Kuwagata	Taruto Akamaki	Keizō Kusakawa	February 16, 2026
Cero learns Luc is becoming more interested in torture and worries about encouraging him. Shiu warns Luc that being a torturer can be difficult, so they want their home lives as normal as possible, which Cero won't get anymore if Luc becomes a torturer from a childish need to be close to Cero. This backfires as Luc decides to take torture even more seriously. Hugh's university friend Las is glad Hugh has Mikke as another friend, since Hugh always struggled socially in high school due to his face, though their chosen careers unsettle him somewhat. Cero and Shiu attend a school recital for his daughters. Despite his stoic demeanour Shiu is somehow popular with the mothers. Afterwards they visit the grave of Shiu's wife. The next day Shiu is grumpy since from all the pictures he took at the recital the only one his daughters wanted framed was of them smiling with Cero. Fon visits and finds Spirytus seriously overworked after three nearby torture companies closed and all their contracts transferred to Spirytus. Hela is proud of everyone for getting the extra work done anyway. Shiu is pleased no one thought of quitting either. Cero, Hugh and Mikke suspect, but can't prove, that they actually saw Shiu smile.
8	"Part-Time Job: Day 8"; Transliteration: "Baito 8 Nichi-me" (Japanese: バイト8日目)	Ageha Kochōran	Hitomi Amamiya	Fumitoshi Oizaki	February 23, 2026
Mikke and Hugh's latest victim collapses before they can torture him, so Cero summons Dr Izua to treat him. It is revealed in their youth Shiu and Hela were badly injured, for which Shiu blamed himself, and Izua still treats Hela for chronic pain. Cero thinks Shiu should stop hiding his own scarred eye but accepts his pain is more emotional than physical. Mikke accidentally cuts his own hand and is treated by Merim, a nurse employed by Izua who speaks exclusively through a ventriloquist bear. Cero explains to Mikke Izua treated Merim as a child, causing her to fall in love with him, though Izua does not encourage this. Mikke's novel Torture Bullet becomes more popular, though his publisher doubts Cero and Shiu could possibly be real people. As he is planning a second novel Mikke gets permission to read Noe's records on Cero and Shiu's more extreme cases. His publisher is thrilled Mikke's new main character is a rookie torturer, based on himself. Mikke and Hugh discover the board games Cero and Shiu used to play between victims. Cero and Mikke decide to play Shiu and Hugh at several games. Cero decides they should play more games in the future, annoying Noe as Cero tries to buy them using company funds.
9	"Part-Time Job: Day 9"; Transliteration: "Baito 9 Nichi-me" (Japanese: バイト9日目)	Kabuto Kuwagata	Usagi Usaki	Kabuto Kuwagata	March 22, 2026
Spirytus decides to have a flower viewing party but they get so many urgent torture jobs they don't have time. Shiu and Cero rush the jobs as quickly as possible but are forced to rush to see the flowers in a darker part of the city due to their blood-stained clothes. Shiu and Cero take Mikke and Hugh to Belta's shop for more tools. They also decide to study to upgrade their licences. Belta is baffled Shiu and Cero act like proud parents. Fon visits and finds Hugh and Mikke upset they accidentally killed a non-Korokke victim. Cero assures them it doesn't matter this time, but if it happened with a victim that had to remain alive Hugh and Mikke would lose their licences and Spirytus would be fined. Fon is glad Hugh and Mikke are only sad they disappointed Cero but still believe in their work. Hugh and Mikke attend another university lecture with Las. Professor Summon suggests Hugh might do well working for the Torturer's Association, which focuses on politics and law, so he wouldn't have time to torture anymore. Hela agrees to support Hugh if it is what he wants but also panics on hearing Summon's name, as he is the terrifying monster who trained Hela how to torture.
10	"Part-Time Job: Day 10"; Transliteration: "Baito 10 Nichi-me" (Japanese: バイト10日目)	Ageha Kochōran	Taruto Akamaki	Keizō Kusakawa	March 29, 2026
The host club NOX that supplies Hela with information asks her help as all their hosts are ill, so Hela volunteers everyone to be hosts for a night. Cero gives a crash course on entertaining women. Miraculously they perform well enough to receive bonuses. The next day, everyone accidentally drinks Izua's new drug. Having fallen victim to Izua's experimental drugs before Cero isn't badly affected, but Shiu, Hugh and Mikke are turned into children. Unable to torture, everyone catches up on paperwork, despite Cero trying to spoil them and preventing Shiu from smoking. Everyone returns to normal, except Cero who suddenly becomes a child due to a delayed reaction. As Hugh and Mikke are often trained by Shiu and Cero respectively they decide to swap instructors for a day, but it does not go well due to clashing personalities. Mikke witnesses Von take part in a drug deal and decides he is untrustworthy, unaware Von was just buying cat food for his cats Mi and Chi. Hugh and Mikke join Cero and Shiu for some night-time work, though mainly to try Shiu's cooking which is so good they end up asleep before even starting the night work.
11	"Part-Time Job: Day 11"; Transliteration: "Baito 11 Nichi-me" (Japanese: バイト11日目)	Ageha Kochōran	Hitomi Amamiya	Fumitoshi Oizaki	April 5, 2026
Belta provides samples of exotic torture devices, hoping Spirytus might buy one, but Hugh and Mike decide they are impractical and return them. Cero arrives at work injured, explaining a friend of one of his past victims attacked him, but he considers this a normal occupational hazard. Shiu is furious Cero was injured, but Cero admits he would have been furious if Shiu was injured, so they agree not to make a big deal of it. Hela takes everyone to a hot spring hotel. Mike is curious why Hela and Noe don't join them in the bath. Cero claims they are both shy, though in reality Hela is hiding her scars. Mike accidentally lets Noe have alcohol, irritating Cero as Noe is an even worse drunk than he is. When Shiu bumps into him Mike asks about his vision, and Shiu admits his right eye is prosthetic. Mike realises this is probably why Cero always stands on Shiu's left side. Shiu decides to talk about his eye one day, but admits it will probably be years. A particularly difficult victim is delivered to Spirytus, providing a perfect opportunity for Shiu, Cero, Hugh and Mike to torture him as a four-man team all at once.
12	"Part-Time Job: Day 12"; Transliteration: "Baito 12 Nichi-me" (Japanese: バイト12日目)	Shingo Tamaki	Hitomi Amamiya	Fumitoshi Oizaki	April 12, 2026
In the past Hela picked Shiu off the street, deciding he had potential as a torturer. Bored of everyday life Shiu quit school, got his face tattoo and started freelance torturing. Three years later Hela considered opening a proper business. Other torturers, angry Hela was freelance torturing in their territory, attacked him with acid leaving him with permanent pain. They also beat Shiu until he lost an eye. Hela opened Spirytus anyway and several months later an undercover journalist named Sowa posed as a torture victim but was mistakenly sent to Spirytus and almost tortured by Shiu. Hela began giving her small investigative jobs so she spent a lot of time with Shiu and he eventually fell in love with her. One day Sowa simply left and Shiu didn't see her for three years until she invited him to see her in hospital where she was suffering with terminal illness. She also introduced him to his now two-year-old daughters Leu and Nero, explaining she was confused after finding out she was pregnant and foolishly ran away from everything. Shiu married her straight away so he could raise their daughters after Sowa died. A short time after the funeral Hela hired Cero as Shiu's new apprentice.

=== Other ===
In commemoration of the release of the series' third volume, a promotional video was uploaded to the Young Animal YouTube channel on December 27, 2023. The video featured voice performances from Junya Enoki and Hiroshi Kamiya.

== Reception ==
The series was nominated for the ninth Next Manga Awards in 2023, and was ranked sixth out of 61 nominees. The series was ranked fifth in the Web Manga General Election 2023.
