= Aoni Production =

Japanese talent agency

Aoni Production Co. Ltd.
- Native name: 株式会社青二プロダクション
- Romanized name: Kabushiki-gaisha Aoni Purodakushon
- Type: Kabushiki kaisha
- Industry: Voice acting
- Founded: April 1, 1969
- Headquarters: Pola Aoyama Bldg. 5F; 2-5-17 Minami-Aoyama, Minato, Tokyo, Japan
- Key people: Toshio Furuichi (president)
- Services: Talent management
- Revenue: 26,000,000 yen
- Website: www.aoni.co.jp

Aoni Production Co. Ltd. (株式会社青二プロダクション, Kabushiki-gaisha Aoni Purodakushon) is a Japanese talent agency representing a fair number of voice actors and other Japanese entertainers. It was founded in 1969 by Susumu Kubo.

== Voice actors currently affiliated with Aoni ==
All names are in Western order (given name followed by family/last name).

- Mai Aizawa
- Kenji Akabane
- Shin Aomori
- Ryōhei Arai
- Daiki Arioka
- Yōhei Azakami
- Nobutoshi Canna
- Hisao Egawa
- Masashi Ebara
- Hiroko Emori
- Miyako Endō
- Yukiyo Fujii
- Toshio Furukawa
- Tōru Furuya
- Banjō Ginga
- Aya Hara
- Lenne Hardt
- Junko Hagimori
- Fumi Hirano
- Masato Hirano
- Ryo Hirohashi
- Aya Hisakawa
- Katsuhisa Hōki
- Hideyuki Hori
- Yukitoshi Hori
- Mitsuko Horie
- Mami Horikoshi
- Chigusa Ikeda
- Michihiro Ikemizu
- Kazue Ikura
- Naoki Imamura
- Tetsu Inada
- Marina Inoue
- Hideo Ishikawa
- Kanae Itō
- Mitsuo Iwata
- Yumi Kakazu
- Hirohiko Kakegawa
- Shino Kakinuma
- Hiroshi Kamiya
- Ryōsuke Kanemoto
- Yui Kano
- Rumi Kasahara
- Machiko Kawana
- Yasuhiko Kawazu
- Mami Kingetsu
- Takuya Kirimoto
- Atsushi Kisaichi
- Yukimasa Kishino
- Michitaka Kobayashi
- Rika Komatsu
- Yuka Komatsu
- Hiromi Konno
- Mariko Kouda
- Takayuki Kondou
- Marika Kouno
- Yoshiyuki Kono
- Mami Koyama
- Takeshi Kusao
- Houko Kuwashima
- Yuji Machi
- Ai Maeda
- Tomoko Maruo
- Masaya Matsukaze
- Takashi Matsuyama
- Yasunori Masutani
- Hikaru Midorikawa
- Shiori Mikami
- Yūko Minaguchi
- Yūko Mita
- Hiroaki Miura
- Wasabi Mizuta
- Yuki Nagaku
- Kazuya Nakai
- Chisato Nakajima
- Tōru Nakane
- Taeko Nakanishi
- Sara Nakayama
- Keiichi Nanba
- Kumiko Nishihara
- Hiromi Nishikawa
- Keiichi Noda
- Yuri Noguchi
- Hirofumi Nojima
- Kenji Nojima
- Kenji Nomura
- Ai Nonaka
- Masako Nozawa
- Yūsuke Numata
- Mahito Ōba
- Fukushi Ochiai
- Yūsei Oda
- Shin'ichirō Ōta
- Ryōtarō Okiayu
- Masaya Onosaka
- Ryūzaburō Ōtomo
- Hitomi Ōwada
- Naomi Ōzora
- Romi Park
- Kimiko Saitō
- Yuka Saitō
- Osamu Saka
- Daisuke Sakaguchi
- Ayane Sakura
- Nozomu Sasaki
- Akemi Satō
- Ayaka Saitō
- Chie Satō
- Masaharu Satō
- Yūki Satō
- Shinobu Satōchi
- Miyuki Sawashiro
- Hidekatsu Shibata
- Shino Shimoji
- Bin Shimada
- Junko Shimakata
- Nobunaga Shimazaki
- Naomi Shindō
- Ryōko Shiraishi
- Umeka Shōji
- Hisayoshi Suganuma
- Kazuko Sugiyama
- Mariko Suzuki
- Masami Suzuki
- Minori Suzuki
- Sanae Takagi
- Yasuhiro Takato
- Karin Takahashi
- Yugo Takahashi
- Gara Takashima
- Masaya Takatsuka
- Eiji Takemoto
- Ryōta Takeuchi
- Mayumi Tanaka
- Hideyuki Tanaka
- Ryōichi Tanaka
- Atsuki Tani
- Kanako Tateno
- Naoki Tatsuta
- Yōko Teppōzuka
- Kyōko Terase
- Haruka Terui
- Michie Tomizawa
- Kyōko Tongū
- Kimito Totani
- Machiko Toyoshima
- Minami Tsuda
- Makoto Tsumura
- Noriko Uemura
- Megumi Urawa
- Emi Uwagawa
- Misa Watanabe
- Naoko Watanabe
- Nana Yamaguchi
- Taro Yamaguchi
- Yuriko Yamaguchi
- Yuriko Yamamoto
- Aya Yamane
- Michiyo Yanagisawa
- Yusaku Yara
- Miwa Yasuda
- Hina Yōmiya
- Takahiro Yoshimizu
- Aoi Yūki
- Chiaki Yurin

== Voice actors formerly affiliated with Aoni ==
- Masashi Amenomori (deceased)
- Takeshi Aono (deceased)
- Yoshiko Asai
- Masumi Asano
- Kinpei Azusa (deceased)
- Masako Ebisu
- Sachiko Chijimatsu
- Toshiko Fujita (deceased)
- Jun Fukuyama (co-founded and now at BLACKSHIP)
- Daisuke Gōri (deceased)
- Keiko Han (moved to NEVERLAND Arts)
- Eriko Hara
- Show Hayami (now the director of Rush Style)
- Eiko Hisamura
- Chieko Honda (deceased)
- Ryo Horikawa (now the director of Aslead Company)
- Kazuhiko Inoue (now the director of B-Box)
- Makio Inoue (deceased)
- Unshō Ishizuka (deceased)
- Akira Kamiya
- Akemi Kanda
- Tomoko Kaneda (now at Across Entertainment)
- Eiji Kanie (deceased)
- Chiyoko Kawashima (retired)
- Iemasa Kayumi (deceased)
- Takaya Kuroda
- Kaneta Kimotsuki (deceased)
- Yonehiko Kitagawa (deceased)
- Eiko Masuyama (deceased)
- Ginzo Matsuo (deceased)
- Taiki Matsuno (deceased)
- Minori Matsushima (deceased)
- Yūji Mitsuya
- Katsue Miwa (deceased)
- Kōhei Miyauchi (deceased)
- Yūko Mizutani (deceased)
- Fumie Mizusawa (moved to Sigma Seven)
- Katsuji Mori (moved to Plus one company)
- Masakazu Morita
- Mugihito
- Ichirō Nagai (deceased)
- Nao Nagasawa (formerly Naomi Nagasawa – now affiliated with Ken Production)
- Shiho Niiyama (deceased)
- Junko Noda (moved to Kaleidoscope, now freelance)
- Michiko Nomura
- Megumi Ogata
- Kenichi Ogata (now at Umikaze)
- Shinji Ogawa (moved to Office Osawa, now deceased)
- Noriko Ohara (deceased)
- Makiko Ohmoto
- Yuko Nagashima
- Marina Ōno
- Daisuke Ōno – now freelance.
- Hiroshi Ōtake (deceased)
- Chikao Ōtsuka (deceased)
- Nobuyo Ōyama (retired/deceased)
- Satomi Satō (now with Axl-One)
- Yumiko Shibata
- Shunsuke Shima (deceased)
- Mari Shimizu
- Kōzō Shioya (deceased)
- Yoku Shioya
- Kaneto Shiozawa (deceased)
- Fuyumi Shiraishi (deceased)
- Mayumi Shō (moved to Kekke Corporation)
- Kazuyuki Sogabe (retired/deceased)
- Tomiko Suzuki (deceased)
- Chiaki Takahashi (moved to Arts Vision, now freelance)
- Kazunari Tanaka (deceased)
- Sakura Tange
- Isamu Tanonaka (deceased)
- Keiko Toda
- Yōko Kawanami (deceased)
- Yumi Tōma (now at her own agency ALLURE&Y)
- Akane Tomonaga
- Kōsei Tomita (moved to Production Baobab, now deceased)
- Kei Tomiyama (deceased)
- Kouji Totani (deceased)
- Noriko Tsukase (deceased)
- Hiromi Tsuru (deceased)
- Kōji Yada (deceased)
- Fushigi Yamada (formerly Kyoko Yamada)
- Keaton Yamada (retired)
- Keiko Yamamoto (deceased)
- Wakana Yamazaki (deceased)
- Jōji Yanami (deceased)
- Natsumi Yanase
- Rihoko Yoshida
- Haruka Nakanishi
