= List of Genesis of Aquarion characters =

This is a list of characters from the anime series Genesis of Aquarion.

== Characters ==
=== Elements ===
The Elements are youngsters with special powers are gathered from around the world and trained by DEAVA, in order to pilot the Vector Machines.

Apollo (アポロ, Aporo)
Voiced by: Takuma Terashima (Japanese); Christopher Bevins (English)
The main protagonist, Apollo is an orphan who grows up amongst a group of homeless children. His name was given to him by his best friend Baron, as a reference to the legendary Greek god Apollo. Apollo possesses a kind heart and a noble spirit behind his rude, aggressive and bestial behavior, with extremely sharp reflexes and senses akin to a wild animal. His characteristics cause few DEAVA members to believe the rumor he is the reincarnation of the "Solar Wing" Apollonius (アポロニアス, Aporoniasu).
Apollo gradually learns and acquires new talents, as well as showing his amazing ability to pilot Aquarion. Following the collapse of the Tree of Life, Apollo bravely chooses to sacrifice himself, along with Sirius and Toma to restore the world. However, he promises Silvia that he will return in 12,000 years (although it is never explained precisely why this particular time is chosen, it could possibly be some reference to the next reincarnation cycle). His elemental power is his fighting strength, able to shatter the head of a Cherubim Soldier with a single punch while piloting Aquarion.
Later it is revealed in Aquarion Evol that Apollo's soul originated from Apollonius's pet, the Winged Hound Pollon, which also explains his animalistic behavior. Pollon also loved Celiane, but as she was already in love with Apollonius, it made a wish to the heavens begging to reincarnate in the future as a human to finally stay by her side where he is able to be loved by Celiane's reincarnations every 12,000 years.

Silvia de Alisia (シルヴィア・ド・アリシア, Shiruvia do Arishia)
Voiced by: Yumi Kakazu (Japanese); Brina Palencia (English)
The main heroine, Silvia is a noble from the Alisia family and the reincarnation of Apollonius' human lover Celiane. Silvia possesses great physical strength and admiration for her older brother Sirius, who she, like everyone else, initially believes is the real reincarnation of the "Solar Wing." She constantly argues with Apollo, not only because she thinks he is an impostor, but because of his rude habits and untamed nature. Her elemental power is her psychokinesis, and later is revealed to be a descendant of Apollonius and Celiane, thus being a Shadow Angel/Human hybrid possessing some of the powers of a Shadow Angel.
For much of the series, Silvia hangs off her brother and attempts to sabotage his relationships. As the story progresses, it is revealed she carries the "light" half of Celiane's reincarnated soul (the part that remembered what happened in her previous life). It is this part of Celiane that Silvia feels affectionate for Apollo. She bids farewell to him as he decides to save the world through self-sacrifice, promising to look after his homeless friends and await his return 12,000 years later.

Sirius de Alisia (シリウス・ド・アリシア, Shiriusu do Arishia)
Voiced by: Tomokazu Sugita (Japanese); Eric Vale (English)
Silvia's older brother, he is passionate on the concepts of aesthetics and perfection. A skilled swordsman, many DEAVA members, including Sirius, believed he was the true reincarnation of the "Solar Wing," thus Sirius despises Apollo when he enters the organization. Despite his love for his sister, Sirius is often annoyed due to her unrelenting adoration of him, as she jealously tries to sabotage his potential relationships with other females in DEAVA.
As it becomes more obvious Apollo is Apollonius reincarnated, Sirius' jealousy and hate consumes his mind, eventually provoking him to take drastic measures. He attempts to stop Silvia from helping Apollo, and subsequently finds out he is also the reincarnation of Celiane -- but the "dark" side of her soul (the part that forgot what happened in his previous life). To that end, he allies with the Shadow Angels, but when the Tree of Life withers and dies, Sirius redeems himself, along with Toma and Apollo, by providing his life to restore the world. His elemental power is an unnamed ability to "scan" areas such as rooms, and later is revealed to be a descendant of Apollonius and Celiane, thus being a Shadow Angel/Human hybrid just like his sister.

Pierre Vieira (ピエール・ヴィエラ, Piēru Viera)
Voiced by: Masaya Onosaka (Japanese); Travis Willingham (English)
A star soccer player, Pierre is a hyperactive Element, with more than the double of serotonin levels than in any other Element. His hometown is San Jose. Always trying to flirt with any of DEAVA's female residents at any chance he gets, Pierre hides the pain of a lost love from the past, whom he abandons in order to join the fight against the Shadow Angels. Despite his teasing and flirtatiousness, Pierre can be very passionate with himself and others and is among the most clear-sighted Elements, able to see attractions and fears in more conflicted individuals, such as Silvia and Apollo. His elemental power is a "Fire Kick" attack that is a perfect combination of his passion for soccer and his burning spirit. Pierre was the first to become addicted to Aquarion's merging process, and became unable to pilot a Vector when it soon got so bad, his mind almost shut down on him causing him near death. He over came his addiction when he realized he needed to grow to save everyone that he loves when the Shadow Angels attacked San Jose on the day his brother was marrying his girlfriend Esperanza who also happens to be Pierre's childhood friend. Pierre is like a role model to Jun and teaches him about merging.

Hong Lihua (紅 麗花, Kō Reika; pinyin: Hóng Líhuā)/Reika
Voiced by: Sanae Kobayashi (Japanese); Colleen Clinkenbeard (English)
A sensitive girl who believes she has a strange ability of misfortune. Not wanting to have those around her affected by it, Lihua forces herself to avoid people approaching her, with the exception of Sirius, who nurtures strong feelings for her and spends many occasions attempting to connect with her. Lihua eventually manages to overcome her rotten luck (and her fear of it) and turn it into a weapon when piloting the Aquarion. Her elemental power is mind telekinesis. She is the reincarnation of Scorpius in the OVA.

Rena Rune (リーナ・ルーン, Rīna Rūn)
Voiced by: Hiromi Satou (Japanese); Carrie Savage (English)
A pale young girl, Rena is blind and has the hair color and sensitivity to light of an albino. Rena uses a wheelchair. She can see people's auras and read the "Book of Holy Genesis," scriptures containing the history of the conflict that occurred between the Shadow Angels and humans 12,000 years ago. The other Elements at DEAVA are intimidated by her stoic, mysterious presence, with the exception of Apollo. While she does not specifically state this, Rena is perhaps a vampire, who admits she needs blood for nourishment when the moon is full and her will weak, alongside the trademark fangs of a vampire. Her elemental powers allows her to levitate, teleport and (regrettably) drain prana from people.

Tsugumi Rosenmeier (つぐみ・ローゼンマイヤー, Tsugumi Rōzenmaiyā)
Voiced by: Tsugumi Higasayama (Japanese); Laura Bailey (English)
A shy girl with a sad past, and her elemental power is the ability to explode things from a distance when her heart rate reaches its maximum. Always estranged from friends and family because of her power, Tsugumi still does not have full control, sometimes creating accidental explosions. This scenario changes when Tsugumi joins with DEAVA and finds an admiration in Lihua, who encourages her throughout her time in the organization. In fact, Tsugumi expresses affection more for Lihua than any other individual Element.

Jun Lee (ジュン・リー, Jun Rī)
Voiced by: Daisuke Sakaguchi (Japanese); Todd Haberkorn (English)
The resident otaku, Jun's elemental power is his "Mind Eye Photography" technique, which can enable him to see through solid objects and quickly target the weak points of enemies. He excels in handling computers and machines and although he rarely enters into battle, Jun spends most of the time operating the computers in DEAVA's control room. Jun was the first person Tsugumi met before getting in to DEAVA. She nearly ran him over but they soon became friends. Both him and Tsugumi can be a little naive but they mean well. Jun is very intelligent and can think fast on the battle field. Rena joked with him during a training exercise saying "You look nervous. Is this the first time you have held a girls hand?" Which he studies and replies "N-n-no. Of course not." And nervously takes her hand. It is also shown that he likes to cosplay. It is revealed at the end of episode 15, "Aquarion's first love," that he became addicted to merging just like Pierre but was not further explored.

Glen Anderson (グレン・アンダーソン, Guren Andāson)
Voiced by: Yuto Kazama (Japanese); Mike McFarland (English)
A close friend of Sirius and Lihua, the three were the first Elements to perform a successful Unification in battle, but this partnership ends abruptly when an accident during the battle puts Glen in a coma. Sirius and Lihua visit him regularly, until they find out he was moved to the medical center at the New United Nations. Later, they discover he is being used to pilot the New United Nations' Military Vectors as a way to fight the Shadow Angels if the Aquarion is out-of-action.
It is revealed that at the New United Nations medical center, he was selected for an operation that involved grafting shadow angel feathers into Elements to give them great strength to combat the Shadow Angels, which gave him a cyborg-like personality. The results of the operation were seen in bad taste by both Humans and Shadow Angels. It is uncertain of what his elemental power is, but in the second-to-last episode in the series it is suggested that it is a close-ranged, more controllable version of Tsugumi's power.

Kurt Klick (クルト・クーリック, Kuruto Kūrikku) and Chloe Klick (クロエ・クーリック, Kuroe Kūrikku)
Voiced by: Romi Park (Japanese); Justin Cook (Kurt) and Caitlin Glass (Chloe) (English)
Fraternal twins whose elemental power is the ability to communicate telepathically with each other, they very rarely partake in combat, instead controlling and monitoring the computers in DEAVA's control room. Chloe is apparently very earnest about things and does not talk to people much, while Kurt is fairly enough the same. They appear to be the most duty-bound Elements in DEAVA. Chloe has feelings for Pierre.

=== DEAVA Operatives ===
DEAVA (Division of EArth Vitalization Advancement) is the organization that created the Aquarion mecha.

Gen Fudo (不動GEN, Fudō GEN)
Voiced by: Unshou Ishizuka (Japanese); Brandon Potter (English)
Gen Fudo conducted an expedition that retrieved the Vector Machines, but disappeared mysteriously so afterwards. When the Elements' battle against the Shadow Angels began, he returns to assume his position as DEAVA's supreme commander. Very knowledgeable of the nature of humans, he uses this wisdom to guide the Element in order to help them surpass their own limitations and increase their teamwork. Later it is revealed in Aquarion Evol that he is actually the real reincarnation of Apollonius and watches over Earth with only one love of the original Celiane.

Sophia Belin (ソフィア・ブラン, Sofia Beran)
Voiced by: Sakiko Tamagawa (Japanese); Stephanie Young (English)
DEAVA's top scientist and researcher, she is very kind and less up-tight on the happenings around the organization. Sophia acts as the teacher in the Elements' mental training classes.

Jean-Jerome Jorge (ジャン・ジェローム・ジョルジュ, Jan Jerōmu Joruju)
Voiced by: Nobuo Tobita (Japanese); Jason Liebrecht (English)
DEAVA's second-in-command, Jean-Jerome is arrogant, pessimistic, quick to judge and somewhat pretentious, the opposite of Commander Fudo. Jerome tends to not agree with or try to understand Fudo's actions, but he is more than willing to see the Shadow Angels destroyed and humanity prospering in their defeat.

=== Other Human Characters ===
Baron (バロン)
Voiced by: Susumu Chiba (Japanese); Zach Bolton (English)
Apollo's best friend, Baron charges Apollo with the task of taking care of the other orphans. He originally meets Apollo when he offers the boy some food during a cold, winter day. From then on, the two become inseparable, resorting to thievery in order to acquire food for themselves and the other children with them. Baron gives Apollo his name after noticing him walking out of a frozen lake he was swimming in, the sun basking behind his back and his footprints steaming behind him, as a reflection of the ancient god Apollo. After being captured by the Shadow Angels, saving him and the other orphans is Apollo's sole reason to fight with the Aquarion. However, during the first season finale, he is brought by Toma in a cage with a bomb attached, in order to force Apollo to open the barrier protecting Aquarion. He does so, and despite getting Baron out of the cage, the latter dies when the bomb detonates and destroys the shield, sending Apollo into a rage. His last words were telling Apollo to look after the little ones, a message that Apollo would frequently remember for the rest of the series.

=== Shadow Angels ===
Holy Angel Toma (聖天翅・頭翅（トーマ）, Shōtenshi Tōma)
Voiced by: Toshiyuki Morikawa (Japanese); J. Michael Tatum (English)
The main antagonist and Apollonius' onetime partner, after Apollonius fell in love with Celiane and defeated the Shadow Angels. Knowing Apollonius will be reincarnated in 12,000 years, Toma places himself in suspended animation and is awoken 12,000 years later. Even after so long, Toma could never forgive him for betraying their kind, but lingering feelings for his beloved Apollonius still resides in his heart. Toma plans to use the Aquarion's power to repair the Tree of Life, but in order to make it possible, he needs to make the Aquarion manifest its true power of the "Solar Wings," thus prepares the various ordeals and trials for DEAVA's Elements, specifically Apollo, in order to make them stronger. Toma's wings are located at his temple.
Upon the destruction of the Tree of Life, Toma joins with Apollo and Sirius to prevent the planet's collapse with the Aquarion, sacrificing himself in the process. Later in Aquarion Evol, it is revealed that Toma was happy to die reunited in soul with the man he once loved, until he discovers that Apollo was not the reincarnation of Apollonius, but Pollon instead. His hatred gives birth to Mikage Towano, who returns 12.000 years later seeking revenge.

Music Angel Otoha (音楽翅・音翅（オトハ）, Ongakushi Otoha)
Voiced by: Mako Hyoudou (Japanese); Monica Rial (English)
Toma's faithful servant, she loves him deeply and despises Apollonius and Celiane, not only because they destroyed Atlandia 12,000 years ago, but also because their love broke Toma's heart. She was killed in the final episode by Lihua, Pierre, and Rena.

Elder Angel Johannes (老賢翅・夜翅（ヨハネス）, Rōkenshi Yohanesu)
Voiced by: Shin Aomori (Japanese); Vic Mignogna (English)
The eldest and leader of the Shadow Angels, Johannes' face is never revealed. His body is draped in robes and chains and wears a metal mask. While he appears to be missing the bottom half of his body and his arms, Johannes constantly suspends himself from the ceiling in the main altar of Atlandia.
In the localized version of Genesis of Aquarion, Randy Tallman was originally cast as Johannes but due to his untimely death, Vic Mignogna was brought in to play the character.

Warrior Angel Moroha (戦翅・両翅（モロハ）, Senshi Moroha)
Voiced by: Kazuki Yao (Japanese); Barry Yandell (English)
A Shadow Angel warrior "who knows no equal," Moroha is the only Shadow Angel who enjoys fighting. He prides himself as being the strongest warrior alive and enjoys toying with his opponents, gauging their strength. He doubts Toma's ability to kill the Solar Wing, occasionally criticizing him for it. Unlike the other Shadow Angels, Moroha resembles an insect; he has six eyes (some covered by a bandage-like scarf), horns and insect-like wings on his back that don't seem to have feathers. He is often seen with an unnamed lion/ape Shadow Angel that might be another warrior. He was killed in the second-to-last episode by Glen Anderson.

Archetypical Angel Lensi (原型翅・錬翅（レンシ）, Genkeishi Renshi)
Voiced by: Unshō Ishizuka (Japanese); R. Bruce Elliott (English)
The architect of the Shadow Angels, he designs and creates the countless number of Cherubim Soldiers DEAVA does battle with. It is said Lensi possesses the fingers of God.

Information Angel Shilha (情報翅・智翅（シルハ）, Jōhōshi Shiruha)
Voiced by: Katsuyuki Konishi (Japanese); Antimere Robinson (Eps. 12, 14), J Paul Slavens (Eps. 17, 19) (English)
An angel with two bodies that resemble a lion with a large, human-like head, hair and wings on its back. One body is white with blue hair, the second body is black with red hair. He acts as Futaba's caretaker.

Child Angel Futaba (小天翅・双翅（フタバ）, Kotenshi Futaba)
Voiced by: Tomoko Kawakami (Japanese); Luci Christian (English)
The only child angel who survived Atlantis' destruction 12,000 years before. His wings are located at his ankles. Like a boy playing joyfully with ants, he often plays with the "Wingless ones" lives. Often, he had no hesitation in finding ways to have fun even at the cost of them. However, his childish manners eventually cost him dearly. He is captured by the humans and taken for scientific testing, and in the process he is killed. His death is the last straw for Toma, who promptly seeks out revenge against humanity. After Futaba's death, his wings are taken and fused with Glen Anderson; his remaining wings are used to power the autonomous systems used in the Military Vectors.

Once there was even a winged creature that could have been a Shadow Angel pet, it looked a bit like a cross between a fox and a dog. It is revealed in the second season that this creature is named Pollon and was Apollonius' pet who later reincarnated into Apollo.

=== Introduced in comic ===
==== Fujimi Shobo series ====
Yugi Kamishiro (神城 ゆるぎ（かみしろ ゆるぎ）, Yūgi Kamishiro)
Protagonist in the series, an Element able to read future events.
Alexsy Smigonov (アレクセイ・スミゴノフ）, Arekusi Sumigonofu)
An Element able to read future events.
Cheryl Sierra (シェリル・セアラ, Sheriru Seara)
An Element able to erase imaginary memory.
Thomas (トーマス, Tōmas)
An Element that runs fast.

==== Flex Comix series ====
Niece Pandora (ニース・パンドーラ, Nīsu Pandōra)
A girl that pilots black Vector.

== Mecha ==
In the process of Unification, the process that combines the Vectors into Aquarion, each Vector is able to transform into a head section (a chest with a head and arms), a back section (a back with a set of wings) or a leg section (a pair of legs). Thus, when the three Vectors combine to form Aquarion, they make a leg/back/head formation with the head being the leading section, and ultimately identifying the form of Aquarion the vectors make as well. The Unification, the process of "merging," also combines the souls of the Elements to some degree, as each supplies one of the supposed three aspects of their soul into one when Aquarion is formed. During Unification, the Elements experience an influx of power and energy, which in classic Japanese fan-service style is shown to be a feeling of wondrous power for the men, while for the women it is blatantly orgasmic in nature. In all three forms, Aquarion weighs 88 tons.

=== Aquarion ===
- Solar Aquarion (ソーラーアクエリオン, Sōrā Akuerion): 48 meters tall. Corresponds to Vector Sol as the head, Vector Luna as the back, and Vector Mars as the legs. This is the most balanced of the three basic Aquarion forms as well as the true form of Aquarion, with its specialty in melee combat. It is the only form that can manifest the "Solar Wings" (ソーラーウィング, Sōrā Wingu) on its back. Later in the series, the Elements develop the Solar Aquarion's signature "Infinity Punch" (無限拳, Mugen Panchi), an attack extending the arm indefinitely in order to reach even the most agile enemy; to elaborate, the Infinity Punch can reach distances that extends to the surface of the moon. The Solar Aquarion is almost always used by Apollo. With both Apollo and Pierre in control, Solar Aquarion can perform the "Fire Fist" (ファイアーフィスト, Faiā Fisuto) technique. In the events of Aquation LOVE, the Solar Aquarion shows the ability to transform into a beast-like form during its fight with Aquarion EVOL.
- Aquarion Mars (アクエリオンマーズ, Akuerion Māzu): 51.1 meters tall. Corresponds to Vector Mars as the head, Vector Sol as the back, and Vector Luna as the legs. It does have a set of wings on its back, but it cannot manifest or de-manifest them. This is the fastest of the Aquarion forms. It is Sirius de Alisia's favorite because it can wield a sword, enabling it to perform the "Long Range Saber" (ロングレンジセイバー, Rongu Renji Seibā) and the "Jealous Sword" (嫉妬変性剣（ゼーロテュピアーグラディウス）, Zērotyupiā Guradiusu; ζηλοτυπία, Zēlotupia Greek for jealous; Gladius, Latin for sword) techniques and due to its long legs and speed, it is perfect for Pierre Vieira's "Fire Kick" (烈火爆裂蹴（ファイヤーキック）, Faiyā Kikku) technique.
- Aquarion Luna (アクエリオンルナ, Akuerion Runa): 46.2 meters tall. Corresponds to Vector Luna as the head, Vector Mars as the back, and Vector Sol as the legs. It specializes in ranged combat, with the ability to wield a bow and arrows, or as another form to partake in melee situations, given the Aquarion Luna's agile movement and reflexes. It too can manifest a set of wings on its back. It is mostly used by Silvia de Alisia, enabling it to use the "Lunatic Archery" (ルナティックアーチェリー, Runatikku Ācherī) and "Spiral Arrow" (スパイラルアロー, Supairaru Arō) techniques, and Hong Lihua, enabling it to use the "Dragon Thunder" (昇竜天雷（ドラゴンサンダー）, Doragon Sandā) technique.

==== Powers and Abilities ====
- Elements: All elements have at least one special power that can be amplificated while piloting Aquarion. Sometimes these increased powers can enable them to create and use "sub-powers" besides their main power, like to make devastating lighting powered spin-kicks or create and use throwing weapon disks.
- Aquarion: All three Aquarion forms are capable of using the powers the elements piloting it have separately or in any combination of the three, as well as combining them with the main powers of the form Aquarion is in at the time (Infinity Punch, bow and arrows or sword) and using the main powers in special ways, such as designating them with unique names or using them in unique ways. The elements piloting it can combine their status', such as strength, speed, targeting, mental strength and willpower, in any way as well, and enable Aquarion to use it as its own in battle. Gen Fudou also trains the elements routinely on how they can unlock and wield other powers Aquarion itself has, such as how to firmly attach Aquarion to the ground so it cannot be moved or make Aquarion's body grow. Sometimes the elements can even use their emotions to make new forms of energy for Aquarion to use: once Lihua turned her fear of her bad luck into unlucky-like energy, allowing Aquarion to use her bad luck to defeat the legend monster, another time Pierre turned his determination to save his family into fire-like energy, from which Aquarion gained a mastery of speed allowing it to defeat Kumba and Nikumba.

==== Secondary forms ====
The following are other forms the Aquarion can take, but only appear in specific situations:

- Aquarion Soluna (アクエリオンソルナ, Akuerion Soruna): After the Solar Aquarion's arms are destroyed and separated, Lihua, Tsugumi Rosenmeier and Pierre united to form this Aquarion. Essentially the Solar Aquarion, it uses the Vector Luna as the head, but flipped forward, becoming the torso on top of the Vector Sol, making a leg/stomach/head formation. It is assumed this is the tallest of Aquarion's forms due to its configuration.
- Aquarion Angel (アクエリオンエンジェル, Akuerion Enjeru): When the Vector Mars was absent, the Elements formed an Aquarion out of the Vector Sol, Vector Luna and a Military Vector Omega, respectively, with the Vector Omega taking the position of head, the Vector Sol as the back, and the Vector Luna as the legs. It is assumed this form retains all of the Aquarion Mars' abilities, even with the lack of the Vector Mars' presence in the combination. The elements that have piloted it are Apollo, Tsugumi, Lihua and Silvia.
- Solar Aquarion 2: Another Aquarion form with the Military Vector Omega. It consisted of the Vector Sol as the head, the Vector Luna as the back and the Vector Omega as the legs, It was piloted by Apollo, Lihua, and Pierre.

=== Assault Type Aquarion ===
The Assault Type Aquarion (強攻型アクエリオン, Kyōkōgata Akuerion) is a copy of the original Aquarion, constructed in a joint operation between DEAVA and the New United Nations using Shadow Angel DNA collected by force. It follows the same basic architecture of the original with a couple of physical differences and uses massive versions of conventional weaponry of cannons, rockets and machine guns as opposed to the original's weapons of bow and arrows, sword and Infinity Punch. Because of the size of its weapons, it is capable of both fighting and defeating the Cherubim. This Aquarion is normally piloted by one Shadow Angel DNA-infused mentally reprogrammed element or even a normal human being, while the other two corresponding Vectors are AI-controlled. It can configure into six different forms and is composed of three Vectors that are colored mostly in gray/black and look very much like the originals. The Vectors are a red Vector named Alpha, a green Vector named Delta, and a blue Vector named Omega, which corresponds to the Vector Sol, Vector Luna and the Vector Mars, respectively. These Vectors are compatible with normal elements and the original Aquarion Vectors and they are mass-produced by the New United Nations.

- Aquarion Alpha (アクエリオンアルファ, Akuerion Arufa): Corresponds to Vector Alpha as the head, Vector Delta as the back, and Vector Omega as the legs. It is the equivalent of the Solar Aquarion. It uses an enormous PSG Cannon in place of its right arm as its primary weapon and like the Solar Aquarion, it can deploy the "Solar Wings" on its back, but does not have the mystical effect of the original. Oddly enough, its head is shaped like the Aquarion Luna's and has a visor over its eyes. This configuration can transform into the Walker Formation without the need to separate the Vectors and reuniting.
- Aquarion Delta (アクエリオンデルタ, Akuerion Deruta): Corresponds with Vector Delta as the head, Vector Omega as the back, and Vector Alpha as the legs. It is the equivalent of the Aquarion Luna. Taking a similarity to the Aquarion Luna's bow, the Aquarion Delta specializes in long-range combat through a complement of rockets that fire from its own customized bow and can also utilize the Aquarion Omega's machine guns, mounted on the same part as the rockets.
- Aquarion Omega (アクエリオンオメガ, Akuerion Omega): Corresponds with Vector Omega as the head, Vector Alpha as the back, and Vector Delta as the legs. It is the equivalent of the Aquarion Mars. Using a pair of machine guns, this form is only featured a couple of times and can transform into the Armageddon Formation without the need to separate the Vectors and reuniting.
- Armageddon Formation (アーマゲドン形態, Āmagedon Hentai): A formation where the three Vectors combine into a 6-legged walker with the Aquarion Alpha's PSG cannon mounted on top, similar to a tank. This formation exists due to the PSG Cannon being able to fire at its maximum capabilities with a stable footing. This form can transform immediately into Aquarion Omega without separating and reuniting.
- Assault Walker Formation (アサルトウォーカー形態, Asaruto Wōkā Hentai): A vehicle formation used for speed, it appears as a jet-like machine with two legs. This form can transform into Aquarion Alpha without separating and reuniting. Its appearance closely resembles the GERWALK mode of the VF-1 Valkyrie from Super Dimensional Fortress Macross, another anime written and directed by Shoji Kawamori.
- Aquarion Beast Form: In the Aquarion movie, when Lihua gets mad and could not understand why Apollo was helping Silvia (who everyone thought was Scorpus, the person who had killed Apollonius) Aquarion Omega transforms into a rampant beast form. The form appears similar to Seismosaurus from Zoids Fuzors and fired the PSG Cannon from its tail.

=== Shadow Angel Mecha and Monsters ===
- Antichthon (アンティクトン, Antikuton): A three dimensional polygon that brings out the inner hatred and/or jealousy of those that see into it long enough.
- Mirror Aquarion (ミラーアクエリオン, Mirā Akuerion): A fake version of Aquarion made from three fake versions of the Aquarion Vectors that possesses all the regular abilities except expansion of the body.
- Reality Tower: A massive tower that can manipulate the reality around it thanks to dimensional distortion by Futaba.
- Dragon Monster: A living dragon-like monster, presumably some kind of bio-weapon.
- Mongie (モンジ, Monji): Tiny harvests beasts used to consume all the food consumed by humans with a great resemblance to the kaiju Dogora.
- Xibalba (シバルバー, Shibarubā): A cherubim-like digging machine that is essentially a giant mechanical worm with large clawed hands and a massive mouth that are used for burrowing through the ground quickly and can fire pulse lasers and missiles from the back of its hands.

==== Harvest Beasts ====
- Black Rena (ブラックリーナ, Burakku Rīna): A harvest beast with the ability to make itself look and act like what the people facing it fear most. Because the elements were afraid of Rena at the time, it took on a Vampire Rena form and acted like a vampire to drain prana.
- Harvest Beast (収穫獣, Shūkakujū): Standard Hammerhead shark-like vessels used to collect humans for Shadow Angels. They possess no offensive capabilities.
- Legend Monster (神話獣, Shinwajū)/Mythic Beast: An ancient water-like harvest beast that remained dormant in a lake. A plant-like one was hidden in a building in Apollo's former hometown.
- Titania (ティターニア, Titānia): A dream manipulator harvest beast from the Moon that exists in the dream world and entraps people in their nightmares.

==== Cherubim ====
- Cherubim Mars (ケルビム・マーズ, Kerubimu Māzu): After allying with the Shadow Angels and taking the Vector Mars with him, Sirius can have a Cherubim Soldier merge with the Vector Mars in place of the other two Vectors. The Cherubim Mars acts the same as the Aquarion Mars, but if its Cherubim Soldier body is destroyed, another Cherubim can take its place.
- Cherubim Blumeblatt (ケルビム・ブルーメンブラット, Kerubimu Burūmenburatto): Miniature versions of regular cherubim soldiers that act as anti-military forces. Although they lack legs they are highly maneuverable users of levitation and are armed with pulse lasers from the head and sometimes the hands. They are very important for the Shadow Angel invasions of human cities to harvest human beings, as they are what broadcast the Shadow Angel's "Hypno song," which hypnotizes normal unprotected humans and makes them sitting ducks for the harvest beasts to collect.
- Graave Cherubim (グラーヴェ・ケルビム, Gurāve Kerubimu): A special cherubim with immensely thick armor that can stand up to most assaults with very little damage. It can fire Pulse beams from its large head and the hands and it can also use its drill-like gloves for melee combat as well as launch them.
- Cherubim Iskuron (ケルビム・イスキューロン, Kerubimu Isukyūron): A colorful custom cherubim used by (and resembles) Mohora capable of bisecting. Its pulse beams are green instead of blue and aside from being normally fired from the head and club-like claws can also be used as daggers in melee. Other powers include an energy beam from the chest and teleportation.
- Cherubim Lune (ケルビム・リュンヌ, Kerubimu Ryunnu): A special cherubim that was infused with "the moon's ability to be not too near yet not too far." It can dodge nearly any attack and can produce black/purple electric balls from its hands. It can also quickly recover from normal attacks.
- Cherubim Soldier (ケルビム兵, Kerubimu Hei): Standard mecha used by the Shadow Angels capable of flying very fast and firing a variety of blue pulse lasers and sometimes even missiles from their head and palms. The only notable versions are Toma's revived one capable of spinning fast enough to produce tornadoes in episode 2 and the soldier armed with the gravity staff from episode 4.
- Cherubim Sur le Kubera (ケルビム・シュルルクベラ, Kerubimu Shururukubera): A customized cherubim used by Toma and later Otoha armed with a pair of swords and pulse lasers from the palms designed for impalement like spears.
- Cherubim Verizeva (ケルビム・ヴェルルゼバ, Kerubimu Veruruzeba): A black cherubim soldier made and used by Toma in two of the last episodes in the series. It is armed with a pair of rapiers and pulse lasers from the palms designed for impalement like spears and has great speed and agility.
- Kumba and Nikumba (クンバ&ニクンバ, Kunba to Nikunba): A pair of cherubim that share a core and can exchange it between each other; the one without the core becomes indestructible and by exchanging it with the other when the one with the core is struck down, they are almost unstoppable. They look like a fiesta-like mix of the Cheribum Iskuron and the Graave Cheribum, except they have yellow-and-black coloring.

=== Introduced in comic ===
==== Flex Comix series ====
Black Vector (ブラックベクター, Burakku Bekutā)
Pandora's Vector unit.
