= Haruka Nakanishi =

Japanese voice actress

Haruka Nakanishi 中西 悠
- Born: September 3, 1977 (age 48); Nara Prefecture, Japan
- Occupation: Voice actress

Haruka Nakanishi (中西 悠, Nakanishi Haruka; born September 3, 1977 in Nara Prefecture) is a Japanese voice actress who is currently affiliated with Stardas 21. She was formerly affiliated with Aoni Production. Nakanishi is a graduate of Doshisha Women's College of Liberal Arts, a private college for women.

== Filmography ==
Major roles are highlighted in bold.

=== Dubbing work ===
==== Film ====
- Inside Man - Madge (Kandiss Edmundson)

==== Television ====
- Without a Trace - Linda (Season 5)
