= Atelier Ryza: Ever Darkness & the Secret Hideout =

2019 video game by Gust Co. Ltd.

- Developer: Gust
- Publisher: Koei Tecmo
- Director: Shinichi Abiko
- Producer: Junzo Hosoi
- Designer: Shinichi Abiko
- Programmer: Katsuto Kawauchi
- Artist: Toridamono
- Writer: Yashichiro Takahashi
- Composers: Daisuke Achiwa; Shinichiro Nakamura; Kosuke Mizukami; Asami Mitake; Hayato Asano
- Series: Atelier
- Platforms: Nintendo Switch; Nintendo Switch 2 PlayStation 4 PlayStation 5 Microsoft Windows
- Release: JP: September 26, 2019 (Switch, PS4); NA: October 29, 2019; WW: November 1, 2019 (Switch, PS4, Windows) November 13, 2025 (Switch 2, PS5)
- Genre: Role-playing
- Mode: Single-player

Atelier Ryza: Ever Darkness & the Secret Hideout (Note: Japanese: ライザのアトリエ 常闇の女王と秘密の隠れ家, Hepburn: Raiza no Atorie: Tokoyami no Joō to Himitsu no Kakurega) is a role-playing video game developed by Gust, and originally released in Japan for the PlayStation 4, Nintendo Switch and Microsoft Windows in September 2019. It was released in North America in October 2019 and rest of the world in November 2019 for the same consoles. It is the twenty-first main entry in the Atelier series and the first of the Secret storyline.

A sequel, titled Atelier Ryza 2: Lost Legends & the Secret Fairy, was released on December 3, 2020, in Japan, and in January 2021 in North America and Europe for PlayStation 4, PlayStation 5 and Nintendo Switch, with a Microsoft Windows version being released in same month for all regions. A second sequel, titled Atelier Ryza 3: Alchemist of the End & the Secret Key, was released for Microsoft Windows, Nintendo Switch, PlayStation 4, and PlayStation 5 in March 2023.

An anime television series based on the game by Liden Films aired from July to September 2023.

An updated version of the game with additional playable characters and content, titled Atelier Ryza: Ever Darkness & the Secret Hideout DX, was released on November 13, 2025, on the same platforms, also including PlayStation 5 and Nintendo Switch 2 as part of the Atelier Ryza Secret Trilogy Deluxe Pack.

== Gameplay ==
Atelier Ryza is a Japanese role-playing video game with a significant crafting component, called alchemy. In the combat portions of the game, battles utilize a modified turn-based combat system incorporating real-time elements. Time moves continuously while the player gives commands to the characters in the party. Attacks build Action Points which can be used to perform skills or special attacks, or to raise the party's Tactics Level which gives access to more powerful abilities.

Outside of combat, the game revolves around alchemy. This involves gathering resources while out in the field, and placing them onto a field of elemental nodes to discover new recipes and create a wide variety of usable items. New to the series in Atelier Ryza is the ability to automate gathering and item synthesis for players that are more interested in the other aspects of the game.

== Plot ==
Reisalin "Ryza" Stout is a girl living on Kurken Island who is eager to have her own adventures. One day she sneaks onto the mainland by boat with her friends Lent Marslink and Tao Mongarten, where they meet and befriend Klaudia Valentz, a merchant's daughter. The four are ambushed by a monster and rescued by the alchemist Empel Vollmer and his bodyguard Lila Decyrus. Impressed with Empel and Lila's skills, Ryza, Tao and Lent convince the duo to accept them as apprentices. Empel starts teaching Ryza the basics of alchemy and helping with Tao's studies while Lent begins combat training with Lila. As the trio improves, they restore an abandoned cottage in the forest, which becomes Ryza's atelier and their base of operations on the mainland. Klaudia later joins the party in their adventures after earning her father's approval.

Distraught by Ryza and her friends' achievements, her estranged childhood friend Bos Brunnen conspires to falsely implicate Empel and Lila for all the trouble on the island, with help from his father Moritz, who is wary of their investigations into the local ruins and wants them banished. Their scheme fails after Empel executes a plan to prove their innocence and Bos flees from home. The party chases Bos down all the way to a gate which leads to an alternate realm called the "Underworld", where they find him under the care of Kilo Shiness, who, like Lila, is a member of the local Oren race, which is fighting a losing war against a powerful horde of insectoid monsters known as the "Philuscha". In the incident, it is revealed that the local water supply was stolen centuries ago by the ancient Klint Kingdom, allowing the Philuscha to ravage the land unchallenged, with Empel and Lila traveling together to seal all gates to stop them from attacking other realms. Bos realizes that the water is stored in a magic orb in possession of his father, and ashamed of his and his family's mistakes, Bos reforms and decides to help the party. Some time later, Ryza and Bos clear up a misunderstanding from their childhood that led to them start avoiding each other and they reconcile.

Back to their world, Ryza and her friends discover that the Klint Kingdom was destroyed by a Philuscha invasion and the survivors took refuge on Kurken Island, which is actually a man-made structure, making them their descendants. They also learn that the island is in danger because the machinery that keeps it afloat is failing due to lack of maintenance. After making some emergency repairs on the island, the party returns to the Underworld to stop another invasion by the Philuscha, succeeding after defeating their leader, the Ravaging Queen. Ryza uses the magic stone taken from the Ravaging Queen's body to finish the island's repairs and Bos destroys the orb to return the stolen water and drive away the rest of the Philuscha swarm. The party celebrates their victory at Ryza's atelier before going their separate ways. Lent becomes a knight-errant, Tao leaves with Bos to study in the capital, Klaudia continues traveling with her father, while Empel and Lila resume their quest to seal the gates to the Underworld, and Ryza stays on the island to make preparations to one day make her own journey alone.

== Development ==
Producer Junzo Hosoi stated in a 2025 interview that the characters' designs were influenced by the economic conditions of Japan during the Lost Decades. He cited a belief that during times of recession, people favor characters with "voluptuous body types" and "motherly characteristics".

== Release ==
The game released in Japan on September 26, 2019, in North America on October 29, 2019, and November 1, 2019, for other regions. The PlayStation 4 and the Nintendo Switch versions had physical releases while the Microsoft Windows version was exclusively released on Steam. The console versions are also distributed via Nintendo eShop and PlayStation Store.

== Reception ==
Reception

Aggregate score
Aggregator	Score
Metacritic	NS: 84/100; PC: 75/100; PS4: 75/100

Review scores
Publication	Score
Famitsu	34/40
PlayStation Official Magazine – UK	7/10
RPGamer	3.5/5

Upon release, Atelier Ryza received "generally favorable" reviews on all platforms, according to review aggregator Metacritic. PJ O'Reilly of Nintendo Life wrote that the game "lifts the series to new heights" with its combat overhaul. Regarding the redesigned alchemy system, he thought the traditional depth of crafting in the Atelier series was balanced by a streamlined experience. He also recognized the game for its emotional narrative and strong main characters, though found fault with slow pacing in the early parts of the game and tedious side missions.

As of August 26, 2020 the game sold 500,000 copies, making it the best-selling title in the series. As of September 14, 2022, the Atelier Ryza series has sold over 1.3 million units, which since then has increased to over 1.6 million units as of March 17, 2023. On June 26, 2023, Koei Tecmo announced that the Atelier Ryza series has sold over two million units.

The game was nominated for "Best Character" with Reisalin Stout at the Famitsu Dengeki Game Awards 2019.

== Other media ==
- Atelier Ryza: Ever Darkness & the Secret Hideout

ライザのアトリエ 常闇の女王と秘密の隠れ家 (Raiza no Atorie: Tokoyami no Joō to Himitsu no Kakurega)
- Manga
- Illustrated by: Riichu
- Published by: Kadokawa Game Linkage
- Magazine: Shūkan Famitsū
- Original run: September 17, 2020 – present
- Volumes: 1
- Anime television series
- Directed by: Ema Yuzuhira
- Written by: Yashichiro Takahashi
- Music by: Kazuki Yanagawa
- Studio: Liden Films
- Licensed by: Crunchyroll (streaming); SEA: Plus Media Networks Asia; TW/HK: Medialink
- Original network: Tokyo MX, Gunma TV, GYT, BS11, ytv, TV Aichi
- Original run: July 2, 2023 – September 17, 2023
- Episodes: 12
- icon

A manga adaptation of the game illustrated by Riichu began serialization in Kadokawa Game Linkage's Shūkan Famitsū magazine on September 17, 2020.

An anime television series adaptation of the game was announced on March 19, 2023. It is animated by Liden Films and directed by Ema Yuzuhira, with Yashichiro Takahashi and Kazuki Yanagawa reprising their roles from the game as script writer and composer. It aired from July 2 to September 17, 2023, on Tokyo MX and other networks. The opening theme song is "Golden Ray" (ゴールデンレイ) by Sangatsu no Phantasia, while the ending theme song is "Arrow" (アロー) by Awkmiu. Crunchyroll streamed the series worldwide outside of Asia. Aniplus Asia licensed the series in Southeast Asia.

=== Episode list ===
No.	Title	Directed by	Written by	Storyboarded by	Original release date
1	"The Alchemist"; Transliteration: "Renkinjutsushi" (Japanese: 錬金術士)	Ema Yuzuhira; Ryūta Yamamoto	Yashichiro Takahashi	Ema Yuzuhira; Kazuya Sakamoto	July 2, 2023
Reisalin "Ryza" Stout is a young girl living in the village of Rasenboden on the island of Kurken, along with her friends, the scholar Tao and swordsman Lent. However, despite her parents being farmers, Ryza herself shows no interest in farming. Not content with living the rest of her life on Kurken, Ryza proposes to Tao and Lent that they leave the island on an adventure, despite a tradition forbidding Kurken's residents from leaving the island. The trio take a rowboat to the mainland and explore a nearby forest, where they rescue young archer Klaudia Valentz from a pair of monsters. However, the four get lost in the forest and are attacked by Pixies. They are saved by the intervention of alchemist Empel and his bodyguard Lila, who were hired by Klaudia's father to rescue her. Ryza becomes fascinated with alchemy after witnessing Empel's feats. Klaudia and her father set up a trading post on Kurken while Empel and Lila stay on the island to explore its ruins. The next day, Empel agrees to teach Tao how to read and Lila agrees to train Lent in combat techniques in return for acting as guides. Empel then tests Ryza on her alchemy skill and realizes she has a natural aptitude for it, so he decides to take her on as his apprentice.
2	"Taking the First Step"; Transliteration: "Mazu wa Ippo no Hajimari" (Japanese: まずは一歩の始まり)	Haruka Saiga; Kazuya Sakamoto	Yashichiro Takahashi	Haruka Saiga	July 9, 2023
Empel gives Ryza her first assignment to collect the necessary ingredients for creating Blessing Ointment. Meanwhile, Lila tasks Lent with creating a map of the village while Tao continues learning how to read. Ryza manages to find most of the ingredients she needs except for Serenity Flower, which doesn't grow on the island. Klaudia then mentions that she recalled seeing a Serenity Flowers growing on the mainland. Empel allows Ryza to return to the mainland together with Lent and Tao. The trio are able to find the Serenity Flowers, and Ryza picks several before attracting the attention of a giant weasel. Thankfully, Lent's leadership and quick thinking allows the party to escape unharmed. Upon the party's return, Ryza successfully creates her first item using alchemy. She then uses the Blessing Ointment she created to heal a young boy who got hurt in an accident.
3	"A Memorable Scent"; Transliteration: "Omoide no Kaori" (Japanese: 思い出の香り)	Shōgo Ono	Minami Nakamura	Akira Odama	July 16, 2023
Empel gifts Ryza a special staff to help her synthesize items more easily. After performing some errands around the village, Ryza learns about a special flower from one of the residents, Mrs. Barbara, and she decides to collect one for her. Empel allows Ryza and her friends to head to the mainland to search for the flower, but sends Lila along with them as a precaution. Ryza finds the flower with the help of a mysterious goat, but Mrs. Barbara mentions it doesn't have the same scent. Klaudia then figures out that the flower was imbued with a different flower's scent and deduces it was from the island's local tailor, Mr. Pat. He admits that he sent the flower to Mrs. Barbara and some Delphi Rose Incense must have gotten on it, but he no longer has any incense. Ryza decides to synthesize more incense with alchemy and Empel provides a rare material for her to use. Ryza successfully creates and combines with the flower, much to Mrs. Barbara's delight. Later, Ryza assures Klaudia that she considers her a friend, which gives Klaudia the courage to play her flute for Ryza.
4	"Sunken Mine"; Transliteration: "Suibotsu Kōdō" (Japanese: 水没坑道)	Misato Takada; Kana Kawana	Yashichiro Takahashi	Takashi Iida	July 23, 2023
5	"The Best Idea"; Transliteration: "Saikō no Aidea" (Japanese: 最高のアイデア)	Akira Toba	Yoriko Tomita	Takashi Kawabata	July 30, 2023
6	"Let's Make a Hideout"; Transliteration: "Kakurega o Tsukurō" (Japanese: 隠れ家を作ろう)	Kazuya Fujishiro	Minami Nakamura	Kenji Kuroda	August 6, 2023
7	"Klaudia's Courage"; Transliteration: "Kuraudia no Yūki" (Japanese: クラウディアの勇気)	Tetsuya Endo	Yoriko Tomita	Tetsuya Endo	August 13, 2023
8	"Alchemy Is an Explosion!"; Transliteration: "Renkinjutsu wa Bakuhatsu da!" (Japanese: 錬金術は爆発だ！)	Ryūta Yamamoto	Yashichiro Takahashi	Ryōko Nakano	August 20, 2023
9	"The Final Test"; Transliteration: "Saigo no Kadai" (Japanese: 最後の課題)	Hazuki Mizumoto; Fumiaki Usui	Yoriko Tomita	Takashi Iida	August 27, 2023
10	"Chasing Down the Hunting Party"; Transliteration: "Tōbatsutai o Otte" (Japanese: 討伐隊を追って)	Misato Takada	Yashichiro Takahashi	Tomoko Akiyama	September 3, 2023
11	"The Final Battle at the Castle"; Transliteration: "Kojō no Kessen" (Japanese: 古城の決戦)	Akira Toba	Yashichiro Takahashi	Kenji Kuroda	September 10, 2023
12	"The Changing Days"; Transliteration: "Kawariyuku Hibi" (Japanese: 変わりゆく日々)	Tetsuya Endo	Yashichiro Takahashi	Kazuya Sakamoto	September 17, 2023
