= Atelier Ryza 2: Lost Legends & the Secret Fairy =

- Developer: Gust
- Publisher: Koei Tecmo
- Director: Shinichi Abiko
- Producer: Junzo Hosoi
- Designer: Yuki Katsumata
- Programmer: Katsuto Kawauchi
- Artist: Toridamono
- Writer: Shinichi Yoshiike
- Composers: Kazuki Yanagawa; Reo Uratani; Yuki Matsumura; Asami Mitake; Kosuke Mizukami; Hayato Asano
- Series: Atelier
- Platforms: Nintendo Switch; Nintendo Switch 2; PlayStation 4; PlayStation 5; Microsoft Windows
- Release: Switch, PS4, PS5: JP: December 3, 2020; NA: January 26, 2021; EU: January 29, 2021; Microsoft Windows: WW: January 26, 2021; EU: January 29, 2021; Switch 2: WW: November 13, 2025
- Genre: Role-playing
- Mode: Single-player

Atelier Ryza 2: Lost Legends & the Secret Fairy (Note: Japanese: ライザのアトリエ2 ～失われた伝承と秘密の妖精～, Hepburn: Raiza no Atorie 2: Ushinawareta Denshō to Himitsu no Yōsei) is a role-playing video game developed by Gust. It is the twenty-second main entry in the Atelier series, the second game of the Secret storyline and the first game of the series with a returning protagonist. It is the sequel to Atelier Ryza: Ever Darkness & the Secret Hideout.

The game was released on December 3, 2020, for PlayStation 4, PlayStation 5 and Nintendo Switch in Japan. A version with English subtitles was released on January 26, 2021 in North America, and on January 29, 2021 in Europe, along with a version for Microsoft Windows in all three regions.

A sequel titled Atelier Ryza 3: Alchemist of the End & the Secret Key was released for Microsoft Windows, Nintendo Switch, PlayStation 4, and PlayStation 5 in March 2023.

An updated version of the game with additional playable characters and content, titled Atelier Ryza 2: Lost Legends & the Secret Fairy DX, was released in November 13, 2025 on the same platforms, also including Nintendo Switch 2 as part of the Atelier Ryza Secret Trilogy Deluxe Pack.

== Gameplay ==
The game features the same gameplay style of the previous title. It is an open world-game in which players craft items using alchemy to equip the party and accomplish missions and win combats. The combat system incorporating elements from both turn-based and real-time also returns, but with improvements.

== Plot ==
Three years after her previous adventure, Reisalin "Ryza" Stout works as both an alchemist and a teacher in Kurken Island until she is invited by her friend Tao Mongarten who is studying with another friend, Bos Brunnen in the capital city of Ashra-am Baird to help with his research on some nearby ruins. In the occasion, she is tasked by Bos' father, Moritz Brunnen, to discover more about a mysterious stone in his possession. Taking the stone with her, she travels to the capital and reunites with Tao and Bos. Ryza and Tao begin their investigation, accompanied by Tao's pupil, Patricia Abelheim, but soon after, Ryza discovers that the stone is actually an egg, from which a mysterious creature hatches, whom she gives the name "Fi".

As Ryza and co. continue their research on the ruins and their connection with Fi, they reunite with their friends Klaudia Valentz and Lent Marslink, with treasure hunter Clifford Diswell and a member of the Oren race called Serri Galus also joining the party. They also meet their former teachers Empel Vollmer and Lila Decyrus, who make their own research in separate from the others. In the occasion, Empel reveals that Fi is a creature from the Underworld who needs to absorb large quantities of mana to survive, and must be sent back to their original habitat or will not survive for long. To prevent this, Ryza and her friends keep uncovering the mysteries of the ruins with Fi absorbing the energy from the large mana crystals inside them for nourishment.

Meanwhile, Empel and Lila learn that the mana crystals act as a seal that protects the region but fail to warn Ryza before Fi absorbs the energy from the last of the crystals, lifting the seal and unlocking a hidden temple. Inside the temple, Ryza's party discover a large gate to the Underworld from which a stronger breed of Philuscha emerges. The party confronts and repels the Philuscha after defeating their leader, the Legendary Monarch. Ryza then bids farewell to Fi, who passes through the gate before Empel seals it. With all matters solved, Ryza bids farewell to her friends and returns home, certain that she will eventually meet them again.

== Release ==
An updated version titled Atelier Ryza 2: Lost Legends & the Secret Fairy DX was announced for PlayStation 4, PlayStation 5, Nintendo Switch 2, and Microsoft Windows in 11 July 2025. It was bundled with the other two games in the trilogy as Atelier Ryza Secret Trilogy Deluxe Pack. The Deluxe version includes Empel and Lila as new playable characters, and a new episode that includes these characters. It was launched on 13 November 2025.

== Reception ==
Reception

Aggregate scores
| Aggregator | Score |
|---|---|
| Metacritic | NS: 80/100; PC: 84/100; PS4: 81/100; PS5: 78/100 |
| OpenCritic | 86% recommend |

Review scores
| Publication | Score |
|---|---|
| Destructoid | 7.5/10 |
| Famitsu | 33/40 |
| Nintendo Life | 8/10 |
| Nintendo World Report | 8/10 |
| RPGamer | 3/5 |

Upon release, Atelier Ryza 2 received "generally favorable" reviews on all platforms, according to review aggregator Metacritic. Fellow review aggregator OpenCritic assessed that the game received strong approval, being recommended by 86% of critics.

By December 2020, the game has sold 220,000 copies in the first month throughout Asia. Atelier Ryza and Atelier Ryza 2 combined shipments exceed one million copies by March 2021. As of September 14, 2022, the Atelier Ryza series has sold over 1.3 million units, which since then has increased to over 1.6 million units as of March 17, 2023. On June 26, 2023, Koei Tecmo announced that the Atelier Ryza series has sold over two million units.
