= Caitlin Glass =

American voice actress

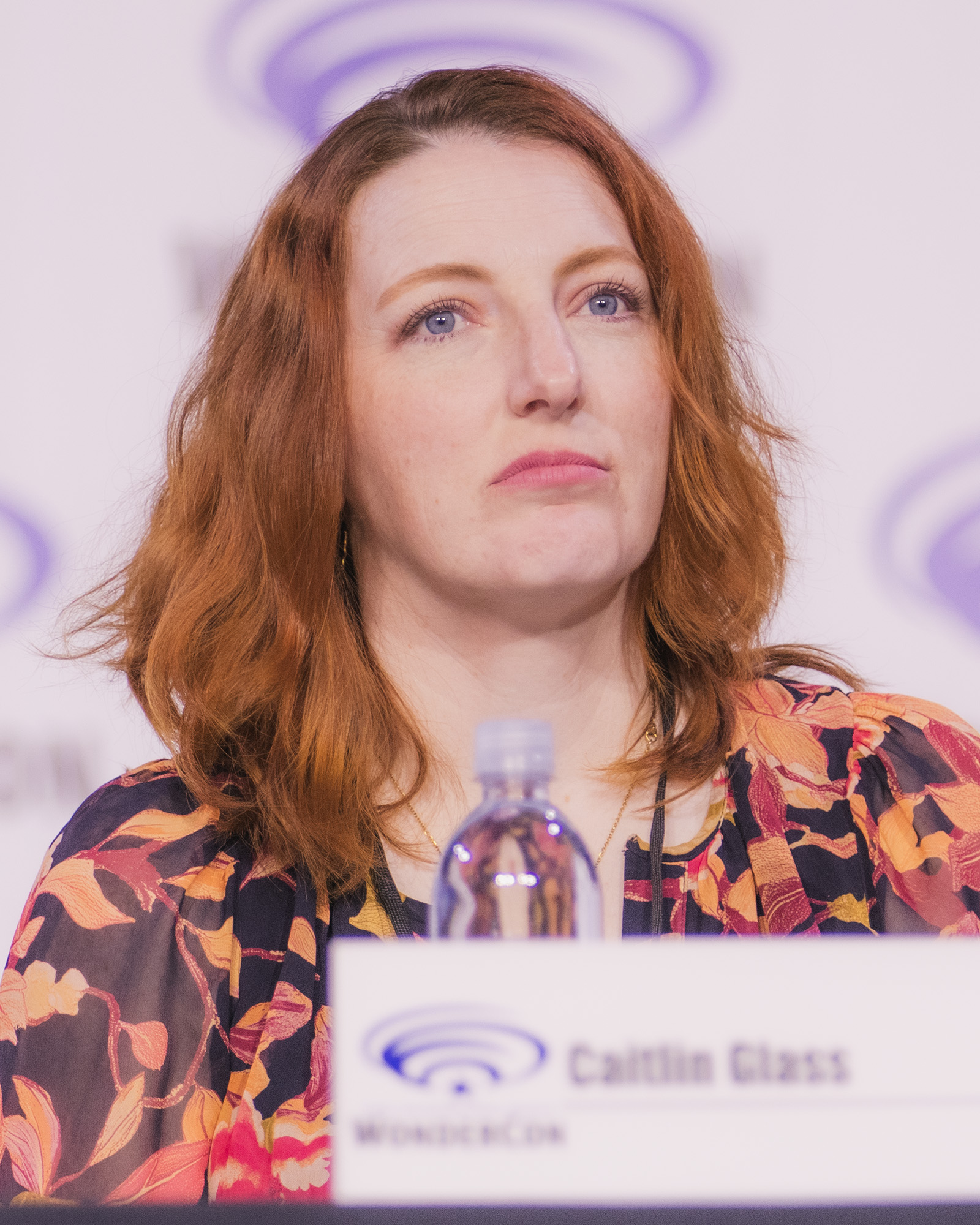
- Glass in 2026
- Born: November 16, 1981 (age 45); Washington, D.C., U.S.
- Education: University of Texas at Arlington
- Occupations: Voice actress; ADR director; ADR scriptwriter
- Years active: 2004–present
- Agent: Epoch Talent
- Spouse: Tony Patterson (m. 2009)

Caitlin Tiffany Glass (born November 16, 1981) is an American voice actress, dubbing director, and script writer who provides voices for English versions of Japanese anime series and video games.

== Biography ==
Caitlin Tiffany Glass was born on November 16, 1981, in Washington, D.C., the daughter of Helen Glass and the sister of Caitlyn Elizabeth. Glass grew up in the San Diego area and attended middle school and high school in Escondido, California. Glass graduated magna cum laude from the University of Texas at Arlington with a Bachelor of Fine Arts in Theatre Arts in 2004.

While still a college student, Glass went on a Funimation studio tour and was hired the same day by voice director Eric Vale. Her first roles were bit parts in Case Closed until she landed the role of Hiyono Yuizaki in Spiral. Glass then went on to voice Triela in Gunslinger Girl.

One of Glass's most notable roles is Winry Rockbell in the English-language adaptation of the Fullmetal Alchemist anime. Glass was cast as Winry, even though she never thought to audition for the role. Glass tried out for Al, Rose, Lust, and Riza Hawkeye; it was her audition for the character of Rose and her previous "hyper" Hiyono voice in the Spiral series that booked her the role, after reading only a single line of Winry's dialogue. Glass reprised her role in the second anime series, Brotherhood.

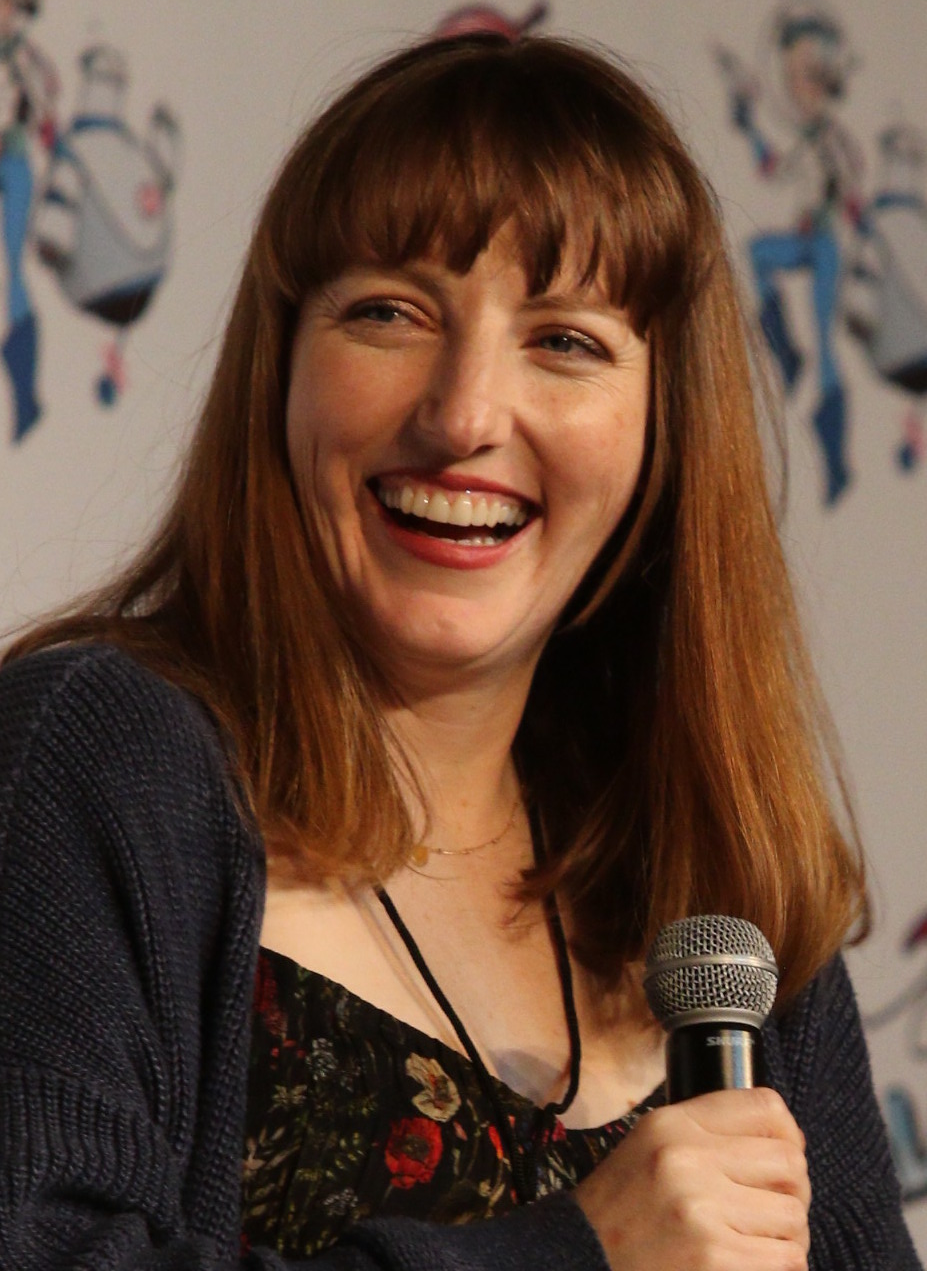
Glass at GalaxyCon Minneapolis in 2019

Glass's other notable roles include Nefertari Vivi in the Funimation dub of One Piece, Kaori Misaka in Kanon, Yakumo Tsukamoto in School Rumble, Eila Ilmatar Juutilainen in Strike Witches, Saya Minatsuki in Black Cat, Hinata Hino in Future Diary, Accela Warrick in Solty Rei, Eleonora Viltaria in Lord Marksman and Vanadis, Miria Harvent in Baccano! Satellizer L. Bridget in Freezing and Mina Ashido in My Hero Academia. She can also be heard in Negima!, Kodocha, The Galaxy Railways, Sakura Taisen: Ecole de Paris, and Lupin III OVAs.

In 2006, Glass began her first major ADR directing project, Suzuka and is one of a select few directors working on One Piece. In 2008, she directed the English version of Ouran High School Host Club and played the lead role of Haruhi Fujioka in the show. Along with directing, Glass has sung on theme songs for Funimation dubs.

== Personal life ==
Glass is married to Tony Patterson. She lives in Dallas. Outside of voice acting, she has worked as an ESL teacher in Spain.

== Filmography ==
=== Anime ===
List of voice performances in anime
Year	Title	Role	Crew role, Notes	Source
2004	Case Closed	Various characters	Debut anime roles ADR Director (episodic)	
2004–06	Fullmetal Alchemist	Winry Rockbell		
2004	Spiral	Hiyono Yuizaki		
2005	Burst Angel	Takane Katsu	"Under the Sky" English ver. Vocalist	
2005	Genesis of Aquarion	Chloe Klick		
2005	Gunslinger Girl	Triela		
2005	Kodocha	Natsumi Hayama		
2005	Sakura Taisen: Ecole de Paris	Erica Fontaine		
2006	Black Cat	Saya Minatsuki		
2006	Negima! series	Chachamaru Karakuri, Chisame Hasegawa		
2006	Shin-chan	Miss Anderson	Funimation dub	
2007	Heroic Age	Dhianeila		
2007	Karneval	Tsubaki		
2007	Kaze no Stigma	Catherine MacDonald		
2007	My Bride is a Mermaid	Mawari Zenigata		
2007	One Piece	Nefertari Vivi	Funimation dub "Run! Run! Run!" English ver. Vocalist "Glory -Kimi ga Iru Kara-" English ver. Vocalist "Faith" English ver. Vocalist	
2007	Ragnarok the Animation	Judia		
2007	School Rumble	Yakumo Tsukamoto		
2007	Solty Rei	Accela Warrick		
2007	Suzuka	Sales Lady	ADR Director	
2007	Tsubasa: Reservoir Chronicle	Souma		
2007	Witchblade	Aoi		
2008	Claymore	Deneve	ADR Co-Director	
2008	Kanon	Kaori Misaka	2006 series	
2008	Sasami: Magical Girls Club	Chief Sorceress		
2008	Shuffle!	Nerinae/Lycoris		
2008–09	Ouran High School Host Club	Haruhi Fujioka	ADR Director	
2009	Baccano!	Miria Harvent		
2009	Rebuild of Evangelion series	Maya Ibuki		
2009	Strain: Strategic Armored Infantry	Sarah Werec		
2009	Murder Princess		ADR Co-Director	
2010–12	Fullmetal Alchemist: Brotherhood	Winry Rockbell, Dr. Sarah Rockbell		
2010	Birdy the Mighty: Decode	Weegie		
2010	Initial D: Fourth Stage	Kyoko Iwase		
2010	Strike Witches	Eila Ilmatar Juutilainen		
2011	Ga-Rei: Zero	Takahashi (Ep. 7)		
2011	Black Butler II	Hannah Annafellows		
2012–19	Fairy Tail	Evergreen		
2011	Chaos;HEad	Newscaster (Ep. 1)	ADR Co-Director	
2012	Is This a Zombie?	Sarasvati		
2012–15	Freezing series	Satellizer el Bridget		
2012	Level E	Momochi (White ranger)		
2013	Red Data Girl	Himegami		
2013	Last Exile: Fam, the Silver Wing	Magnolia		
2013	Guilty Crown	Arisa Kuhouin		
2013	Future Diary	Hinata Hino		
2013	Aquarion Evol	Zessica Wong		
2013	Ikki Tousen series	Shuusou (Seasons 3–4)		
2013	Hetalia: Axis Powers	Seychelles		
2013–16	Maken-ki! series	Minori Rokujo		
2013	Jormungand series	Mildo		
2014	Attack on Titan	Petra Rall		
2014–present	Date A Live series	Ryoko Kusakabe		
2015	Absolute Duo	Lilith Bristol	ADR Co-Director	
2015	Danganronpa: The Animation	Kyoko Kirigiri	Also Danganronpa 3: The End of Hope's Peak Academy	
2015	D-Frag!	Minami Osawa		
2015	Free! series	Miho Amakata		
2015	Hyperdimension Neptunia: The Animation	5pb.		
2015	Nobunagun	Jess Beckham/Newton		
2015	WIXOSS series	Hanayo		
2015	Show by Rock!! series	Retoree	ADR Director	
2015	Noragami Aragoto	Aimi "Ami" Tabata	ADR Director	
2015	Tokyo Ravens	Natsume Tsuchimikado		
2015	Yuki Yuna is a Hero		ADR Script	
2015	A Lull in the Sea		ADR Script	
2015	Durarara!!x2		x2 Ten; ADR Script	
2015	Riddle Story of Devil		ADR Director	
2016	Lord Marksman and Vanadis	Eleonora Viltaria	ADR Director	
2016	Assassination Classroom	Hiromi Shiota	Season 2	
2016	Prince of Stride: Alternative	Various Characters	ADR Director	
2016	Love Live! School Idol Project	Maki Nishikino	ADR Script	
2016	No-Rin	Wakadanna		
2016	Dimension W	Red	Ep. 4	
2016	Garo: The Animation	Aurelia	Ep. 4	
2016–25	My Hero Academia	Mina Ashido		
2016	Shōnen Maid	Antaro	ADR Director	
2016	Alderamin on the Sky	Yatorishino Igsem		
2016	Tales of Zestiria the X	Rose		
2016	The Asterisk War		Season 1 ADR Scriptwriter	
2016	The Vision of Escaflowne	Hitomi Kanzaki	Funimation dub	
2016	Castle Town Dandelion	Shizuru		
2016	Chaos Dragon	Meryl Sherbet		
2017	Fuuka	Tama	ADR Director	
2017	Dragon Ball Super	Vados		
2017	Masamune-kun's Revenge	Tae Futaba		
2017	Chain Chronicle -The Light of Haecceitas-	Michidia		
2017	Seven Mortal Sins	Mina		
2017	Sakura Quest	Yae Koharu	ADR Director	
2017	The Silver Guardian	Mikan	Ep. 11	
2017	Alice & Zoroku	Chinatsu Nakanishi		
2017	Gosick	Marion		
2017	Hyouka	Tomoe Oreki		
2017	18if	Airi Kojima		
2017	Restaurant to Another World	Sarah Gold		
2017	Hina Logic – From Luck & Logic	Principal		
2017	New Game	Umiko Ahagon	ADR Co-Director	
2017	A Centaur's Life	Akechi Mitsuyo		
2018	Pop Team Epic	Pipimi	Ep. 4a	
2018	Skip Beat!	Kyōko Mogami		
2018	Cardcaptor Sakura: Clear Card	Ms. Morita	ADR Director	
2018	Dagashi Kashi	Hajime Owari	season 2	
2018	Zombie Land Saga	Saki Nikaido		
2019–21	Fruits Basket	Machi Kuragi	ADR Director	
2019	Astra Lost in Space		ADR Director	
2019–20	Radiant	Mélie	ADR Director	
2019	Actors: Songs Connection	Nozomi		
2019	Fire Force	Haumea		
2020	Bofuri	Iz		
2020	Plunderer	Nana Bassler		
2020	Appare-Ranman!	Appare's Mother	ADR Director	
2020	By the Grace of the Gods	Elise Jamil		
2021	Horimiya		ADR Director	
2021	Mars Red	Aoi Shirase		
2021	Shadows House		ADR Director	
2021	The Saint's Magic Power is Omnipotent		ADR Director	
2021	Magatsu Wahrheit Zuerst	The Queen		
2021	King's Raid: Successors of the Will	Scarlett		
2021	Irina: The Vampire Cosmonaut	Natalia		
2021	The World's Finest Assassin Gets Reincarnated in Another World as an Aristocrat	Dia Viekone		
2021	JoJo's Bizarre Adventure: Stone Ocean	Jolyne's Mother	Netflix dub	
2021	Seirei Gensouki: Spirit Chronicles	Vanessa Emerle, Stewart Huguenot (young)		
2022	Odd Taxi	Taeko Harada		
2022	Tomodachi Game	Shiho		
2022	Skeleton Knight in Another World	Ariane		
2022	Spy × Family	Damian Desmond		
2022	The Slime Diaries: That Time I Got Reincarnated as a Slime	Soka		
2022	Remake Our Life!	Misaki Kano		
2022	Lucifer and the Biscuit Hammer	Yuuhi's Aunt		
2022	Shinobi no Ittoki	Yumika Sakuraba		
2023	The Ice Guy and His Cool Female Colleague	Komori		
2023	Why Raeliana Ended Up at the Duke's Mansion			
2023	The Legendary Hero Is Dead!	Ethel		
2023	Frieren: Beyond Journey's End	Methode		
2023	The Apothecary Diaries	Fengxian		
2024	Solo Leveling		ADR Director	
2024	Fairy Tail: 100 Years Quest	Evergreen		
2025	Kaiju No 8	Jura		

=== Films ===
List of voice performances in films
Year	Title	Role	Crew Role Notes	Source
2005	Dragon Ball Z: Bio-Broly	Nan		
2006	Fullmetal Alchemist the Movie: Conqueror of Shamballa	Winry Rockbell		
2008	One Piece Movie: The Desert Princess and the Pirates: Adventures in Alabasta	Nefertari Vivi	ADR Director	
2009	Evangelion: 1.0 You Are (Not) Alone	Maya Ibuki	Funimation dub	
2011	Evangelion: 2.0 You Can (Not) Advance	Maya Ibuki	Funimation dub	
2012	Fullmetal Alchemist: The Sacred Star of Milos	Winry Rockbell		
2014	Pokémon the Movie: Diancie and the Cocoon of Destruction	Diancie		
2016	Evangelion: 3.0 You Can (Not) Redo	Maya Ibuki	Funimation dub	
2016	The Empire of Corpses	Moneypenny		
2016	Love Live! The School Idol Movie	Maki Nishikino		
2016	Escaflowne	Hitomi Kanzaki	Funimation dub	
2018	My Hero Academia: Two Heroes	Mina Ashido		
2020	My Hero Academia: Heroes Rising	Mina Ashido		
2022	Sing a Bit of Harmony		ADR Director	
2024	Spy × Family Code: White	Damian Desmond		
2024	My Hero Academia: You're Next	Mina Ashido		
2025	The Rose of Versailles	Oscar François de Jarjayes		

=== Video games ===
List of voice performances in video games
Year	Title	Role	Crew role, Notes	Source
2009	Case Closed: The Mirapolis Investigation	Jess Rayburn		
2009	Street Fighter IV	Cammy, Eliza		
2009	Final Fantasy Crystal Chronicles: The Crystal Bearers	Amidatelion		
2010	Super Street Fighter IV	Cammy		
2012	Street Fighter X Tekken	Cammy		
2014	Borderlands: The Pre-Sequel!	Corporal Best, Brittonia, Elevator Voice		
2014	Smite	Isis		
2014	Ultra Street Fighter IV	Cammy, Decapre		
2015	Dragon Ball Xenoverse	Time Patroller		
2015	Tales of Zestiria	Rose		
2015	Xenoblade Chronicles X	Elma		
2016	Street Fighter V	Cammy, Decapre, Eliza		
2016	Battleborn	Thorn		
2016	Dragon Ball Xenoverse 2	Time Patroller, Vados		
2017	Paladins	Lian		
2017	Fire Emblem Heroes	Mathilda, Safy		
2017	Fire Emblem Echoes: Shadows of Valentia	Mathilda, Safy		
2017	Xenoblade Chronicles 2	Elma		
2019	Borderlands 3	Kay, Wren, Ember		
2020	Guardian Tales	Lilith		
2020	Dragon Ball Legends	Vados		
2021	Paladins	Cammie		
2021	Tales of Luminaria	Alexandra von Sonne		
2022	Phantom Breaker: Omnia	Ria Tojo		
2022	Teppen	Cammy		
2023	Street Fighter 6	Cammy		
2023	Disgaea 7: Vows of the Virtueless	Higan		
2024	Unicorn Overlord	Alcina		
2025	Zenless Zone Zero	Venus		

=== Animation ===
List of voice performances in animation
Year	Title	Role	Crew role, Notes	Source
2018	Nomad of Nowhere	Eugene	Ep. 2 & 3	
2019–present	RWBY	Willow Schnee	Volume 7–8	
