= List of Strain: Strategic Armored Infantry characters =

Strain: Strategic Armored Infantry (奏光のストレイン, Sōkō no Sutorein) is a mecha anime series by Happinet and Studio Fantasia. It premiered in Japan on WOWOW from November 1, 2006. A manga adaptation is being serialized in the Dragon Age magazine. The concept of the series is loosely based upon Frances Hodgson Burnett's novels, most notably A Little Princess, but also Little Lord Fauntleroy and The Secret Garden. In 2008, Texas-based licensor FUNimation Entertainment acquired the license of Strain: Strategic Armored Infantry (also known as Soko no Strain or Soukou no Strain). The anime was available in a complete DVD release on January 27, 2009, across North America.

Almost every character has been adapted from a Hodgson Burnett character. Though the first names of many characters are retained from A Little Princess and the other novels, the last names are scrambled anagrams or other modifications, such as the character Crewe's name being converted to Werec, or the character, St. John's name being changed to Johannitz.

== Union ==
=== Sara Werec ===
Voiced by: Ayako Kawasumi (Japanese); Caitlin Glass (English)

Sara Werec (セーラ·ウィーレック, Sēra Wirekku) is described in the series as a happy, well-liked and bright girl, the star graduate student of the elite Grabera Spatial Armoured Infantry Research Institute, at the beginning of the series. She is an orphan; her parents, James and Annie Werec, are dead and she clings to the notion of seeing her older brother Ralph again. However, when her friends, her teachers and her Mimic are destroyed by none other than Ralph himself, she becomes a brooding, blunt, taciturn girl reduced to piloting unremarkable Gambee units.

The series recounts that after being defeated by Ralph, Sara appears to suffer from post-traumatic stress disorder. Despite her defeat and disgrace instigated by her traitorous brother (which she escapes by cutting her hair, renaming herself Sara Cruz, and transferring to another academy), and the bullying she endures from the bitter and confused Gambee pilots, Sara is completely focused on learning the truth about Ralph's betrayal. Her most precious possession is a musical pendant given to her by Ralph, until it is stolen (presumably by the jealous Isabella) in Episode 2, after which she finds the doll she calls "Emily". Soon afterwards, Sara discovers that, against all expectations, Emily allows her to pilot a Strain again, giving her control of the Ink Strain Ram-Dass. Sara considers Emily to be her last hope to finding out the truth, and hopes that Ralph will revert to the kind and loving brother he once was.

Sara's name comes from the novel's Sara Crewe.

=== Lottie Gelh ===
Voiced by: Yukana (Japanese); Cherami Leigh (English)

Lottie Gelh (ロッティ·ゲラー, Rotti Gerā) in the series is a Reasoner who uses her status above the common Gambee pilots to interfere when justice is needed. She has a sharp mind and a wide network of friends, the closest of which are called the Space Squadron, of whom she is "Queen"; she is most often seen with Jessie. Lottie is determined to have her Space Squadron fight together as a team, and she tries various plans to convince Sara to cooperate in this as the series goes on. However, before Sara becomes a willing member of her team, which Lottie describes as "as close as family, partners in life and death", Lottie realizes that she should work as a team member, instead of a dictator.

In the series, she seems to question who Sara is but does not know Sara's real identity. Lottie notices that Sara "fights like a Reasoner". Lottie hates Ralph Werec because he killed her older brother during his attack on Grabera Academy. Lottie nurtures the ambition of someday killing Ralph herself. While Lottie reacts violently to the news of Sara's true identity, she becomes one of Sara's strongest supporters.

Lottie's name comes from the novel's Lottie Legh. While an early official trailer calls her Lotti Getter, the "Lottie Gelh" spelling appears onscreen in the series.

=== Jessie Ijesse ===
Voiced by: Miyu Matsuki (Japanese); Carrie Savage (English)

Jessie Ijesse (ジェッシィ·アイジェス, Jesshī Aijesu) in the series is Lottie's friend, who constantly goes along with whatever ideas she has, but not without complaint. She is quiet, unathletic, and generally an unaccomplished Reasoner, but is part of Lottie's renowned Space Squadron.

The novel's Jessie was a "silly" but good-hearted girl that was friends with Lavinia. This Jessie does not have a special relation with her, although she responded quite positively when Lavinia, believing her to be Sara, kissed her in the showers.

"Ijesse" is an anagram of "Jessie", as her namesake had no surname.

=== Emily (Mimic) ===
Voiced by: Ai Nonaka (Japanese); Reilly Harrison (English)

Emily (エミリィ, Emirī) in the series is special Mimic that takes the form of a porcelain doll. Sara names her Emily after its model designation, E.M.L.Y.. Sara finds her abandoned with the Ram-Dass Strain in a garage while looking for her stolen pendant. Emily functions in place of Sara's original Mimic, which should be impossible.

Her name comes from Sara Crewe's beloved doll Emily, the one possession that she refuses to surrender after she loses everything else.

=== Lavinia Reberth ===
Voiced by: Ai Nonaka (Japanese); Leah Clark (English)

Lavinia Reberth (ラヴィニア·リベルス, Ravinia Riberusu) in the series is the lowest-scoring Reasoner of the Space Squadron in Basion Academy. Unlike the novel's Lavinia, who tormented Sara Crewe when she could get away with it, this Lavinia is instantly infatuated with Sara "Cruz" and tries many ways to get close to her and attract her, although in a running gag, somebody will always get in her way and spoil her plans. Lavinia also has a tendency to get carried away. This is at first comedic, but becomes tragic as it leads to the death of one of her comrades and the exposure of Sara's identity.

Her name comes from the stuck-up Lavinia Herbert.

=== Ermengarde Johannitz ===
Voiced by: Kayo Sakata (Japanese); Kim Matula (English)

Ermengarde Johannitz (アーメンガァド ヨハニッツ, Āmengādo Yohanittsu) in the series is a fellow Reasoner of Basion Academy, and a member of Lottie's Space Squadron. Her friends call her "Ermy". She is quite obsessed with her weight, although there does not appear to be any reason for her to be so. However, as much as she restricts herself to health food and exercise, she cannot resist a good dessert. Ermengarde and Martha are always seen together.

Her name comes from the original novel's Ermengarde St. John, a friend of Sara.

=== Martha Shoebbeypower ===
Voiced by: Nao Hanai (Japanese); Brina Palencia (English)

Martha Shoebbeypower (マーサ·シュビーパウエル, Māsa Shubīpaueru) in the series is another Reasoner from Basion Academy, is part of Lottie's Space Squadron, and is a close friend of Ermengarde. She looks very masculine and is extremely fond of meat and training her muscles. She and Ermengarde may be a play on the old butch and femme stereotype.

Her name comes from Martha Sowerby of The Secret Garden.

=== Carrisford "Carris" Radofrics ===
Voiced by: Souichiro Hoshi (Japanese); Todd Haberkorn (English)

Carrisford "Carris" Radofrics in the series is one of the two boys in the Space Squadron, he has blue hair and a fondness for Sara. She begins to open up to him when he reminds her of Cedie. Like Cedie, Carris is eventually killed by Ralph Werec, for which Lavinia blames herself. Carris is originally from Gall, but is much younger than he should be due to sub-light speed travel. His younger brother Donny is now much older than he is and is Gall's chief administrator.

His name comes from Mr. Carrisford, the employer of Ram Dass (the namesake of Sara Werec's Strain) and an old friend of Ralph's, who was initially accused of stealing Sara's fortune but comes back to restore it. "Radofrics" is an anagram of "Carrisford", missing one R, as his namesake had no first name.

=== Dickon Cidnok ===
Voiced by: Kisho Taniyama (Japanese); Eric Vale (English)

Dickon Cidnok is the final member of Lottie's Space Squadron. He is rather loud, outgoing, and opinionated. He is a flirt, saying that he exists only for girls, and teases the other Reasoners all the time. He and Carris are a comedic duo that berate each other over their lack of progress with romance (Carris with Sara, Dickon with nearly every other girl in the Spatial Armour Division) until the accident that kills Carris.

His name comes from Dickon Sowerby, the young Yorkshire boy in The Secret Garden who befriended Mary Lennox. "Cidnok" is an anagram of "Dickon", likely used as this version is not related to Martha, who had already used a changed version of their counterparts' shared surname.

=== Melchisedec "Melchi" and Carmichael ===
Melchi: Voiced by: Junko Minagawa (Japanese); Greg Ayres (English)
Carmichael: Voiced by: Asuka Tanii (Japanese); Alison Viktorin (English)

Melchisedec "Melchi" and Carmichael are the creators of Ram-Dass, who have been overlooked in their breaking of a Union law against customized Strains, as their creation (and Sara) saved Basion Academy. They appear to be young children, but are treated as equal mechanics, and in the epilogue where the rest of the Space Squadron has aged, the two are still children. They had the Emily doll in their storeroom, but know nothing about her origins. Melchisedec is an incredible egotist, but Carmichael is always there to bring her friend back to reality. They first cover up what they know of Sara's secret, then expose it when they learn just who she is.

Carmichael was the surname of the large family in A Little Princess, who had been searching for Sara Crewe while she lived next door all along. Melchisedec was Sara's pet rat.

=== Isabella ===
Voiced by: Rie Tanaka (Japanese); Trina Nishimura (English)

Isabella is a blue-haired Gambee pilot from Basion Academy. Isabella has an inferiority complex about her bad grades, and takes it out on Sara, whom she deems an easy target and who refuses to follow her lead. She shies away, though, whenever Lottie Gelh intervenes. Isabella's arrogance eventually becomes her downfall; having failed to listen to a warning she was given about the behaviour of Tumors in battle, she is quickly ambushed and killed during her first real fight.

Isabella is possibly a reference to Isobel Grange, the most beautiful girl connected to the regiment Ralph Crewe belongs to in A Little Princess.

=== Mariette ===
Voiced by: Asuka Tanii (Japanese); Colleen Clinkenbeard (English)

Mariette is Isabella's friend, who is at first shy and does everything that Isabella says; she also shows extreme caution. However, all that changes when Isabella is killed by Tumors under the command of Ralph. Mariette holds Sara responsible for Isabella's death and ridicules her up to the point of trying to kill her. In the end, Lottie convinces her and her followers to support the Squadron.

Mariette was Sara's French maid in A Little Princess.

=== Colin, Mary and Cedie ===
Cedie: Voiced by: Tetsu Shiratori (Japanese); J. Michael Tatum (English)
Colin: Voiced by: Yūki Masuda (Japanese); Chris Burnett (English)
Mary: Voiced by: Rie Tanaka (Japanese); Kate Oxley (English)

Colin, Mary and Cedie were Sara's close school friends from Grabera Academy before it was destroyed. Cedie had a crush on Sara for years, and Colin and Mary had taken it upon themselves to play matchmaker, but Sara was so focused on her studies and seeing Ralph again that she never really noticed. They are killed in Episode 1 after taking Ralph on in an attempt to protect Grabera.

Colin Craven and Mary Lennox are the main characters of The Secret Garden. Cedie is the nickname of Cedric Errol in some adaptations of Little Lord Fauntleroy.

=== Becky Balboa ===
Voiced by: Kayo Sakata (Japanese); Monica Rial (English)

Becky Balboa is a purple-haired trainee medic who is absent-minded and prone to panic during a crisis. Sadly, she is sometimes too quick to perceive a crisis and, in effect, is often harshly reprimanded for every mistake. Sara takes pity on her and offers her advice.

Becky's name comes from the maid in the novel, who was treated as a slave by the headmistress.

== Deague ==
=== Ralph Werec ===
Voiced by: Takashi Kondo (Japanese); Robert McCollum (English)

Ralph Werec (ラルフ·ウィーレック, Rarufu Wirekku) was a dutiful soldier, the star student of Grabera Academy and the youngest person ever to pilot a Gloire Strain. Sara last saw him promising on his parents' grave not to let the family down. Six years later, he reappears in disguise with a scar on his face, having done just that and joined the Deague. He even coldly destroys Sara's home, friends and Mimic. Sara is driven by the mystery of why he has done so, and promises to face him again. Ralph's true motivation is partially out of compassion and partially from insanity.

Ralph Crewe in the novel was Sara's father, who died and his fortune disappeared; this led to Sara Crewe's ruin, as this Ralph's defection did to Sara Werec.

=== Emily ===
Voiced by: Ai Nonaka (Japanese); Reilly Harrison (English)

Emily (エミリィ, Emirī) Not to be confused with Sara's Emily. Ralph also has an Emily, although she is a real little girl rather than a doll or Mimic, and she does not assist Ralph in his Strain. She sees herself as Ralph's new little sister. She strongly resembles Sara's Emily, and she has strange blue markings on her face and hands. As a member of the alien race from which the E.M.L.Y. was developed, she is personally aware of everything that happens to the doll Emily and has developed an affection for Sara because of this.

Like the doll Emily, she is named for Sara's doll.

=== Captain Vivian Medlock ===
Voiced by: Atsuko Tanaka (Japanese); Jennifer Seman (English)

Captain Vivian Medlock (メドロック, Medorokku) is a purple-haired woman in high heels. She is Ralph Werec's immediate superior in the Deague, as well as his lover. She believes in complete annihilation of her enemies, no matter the cost. She first found Ralph when he surrendered to her ship and informed her of Emily's existence and location.

Mrs. Medlock is the person in charge of Misselthwaite Manor in The Secret Garden.

=== Lieutenant Colonel Barrow ===
Voiced by: Katsumi Chō (Japanese); R Bruce Elliott (English)

Lieutenant Colonel Barrow is Captain Medlock's second in Command. Unlike Medlock, Barrow is highly suspicious of Ralph Werec, and believes that Werec is pursuing some hidden agenda. Barrow repeatedly voices his concerns about Ralph to Medlock, but his warnings are never heeded.
