= List of Black Cat chapters =

The chapters of the manga Black Cat were written and illustrated by Kentaro Yabuki and published by Shueisha in Weekly Shōnen Jump from 2000 to 2004. Black Cat's plot follows Train Heartnet, a former assassin known as the Black Cat, who now lives as a bounty hunter, dubbed "Sweeper".

The manga's 185 chapters were collected in 20 tankōbon volumes that were published from January 6, 2001, to October 4, 2004, by Shueisha. It was licensed in English in North America by Viz Media as they first announced it at the 2005 San Diego Comic-Con. The twenty volumes were published from March 7, 2006, to May 5, 2009, under Viz's Shonen Jump label. Madman Entertainment published Viz's English release in Australia and New Zealand. Black Cat was also adapted into a 24-episode anime series with the same name by Gonzo. Directed by Shin Itagaki, the anime aired in Japan from October 6, 2005, to March 30, 2006.

== Volume list ==
No.	Title	Original release date	English release date
1	The Man Called Black Cat kuroi neko to yobareta otoko (黒い猫と呼ばれた男)	January 6, 2001; 978-4-08-873065-3	March 7, 2006; 978-1-4215-0605-0
1: "The Man Called Black Cat" (黒い猫と呼ばれた男, "kuroi neko to yobareta otoko"); 2: "The Messenger from Chronos" (クロノスからの使者, "kuronosu kara no shisha"); 3: "Rinslet Walker"; 4: "An Alliance" (同盟, "dōmei"); 5: "The Girl in Black" (黒衣の少女, "kokue no Shōjo"); 6: "Playing Tag" (鬼でって, "onidette"); 7: "Lost" (迷子, "maigo"); 8: "Russian Roulette"
"Sweepers" (bounty hunters) Train Heartnet and Sven Vollfied capture a man wanted as a mafia witness, but who is then killed by the mafia. They track down the killer, but before Train kills him, he recognizes Train as the Black Cat – an assassin who supposedly died when he betrayed the organization named Chronos. Now that Chronos knows Black Cat is still alive, it sends a messenger to either convince Train to return or to kill him, but Train kills him instead. Soon after this, Train and Sven are approached by Rinslet Walker, a famous thief, offering the sweepers a partnership on a job. She is trying to steal data from an underground research program, and wants them to capture its wanted head, Torneo Rudman, as a diversion. They agree, and while scouting the lab, Train mets Eve while she is killing two guards and learns that she was created by the lab as human bio-weapon using nanotechnology. He escapes from her, and while she searches for him, she meets Sven, who buys her ice cream. When Torneo catches up with her, however, she stabs Sven while protecting Torneo. When Train catches up with him, he is angry his partner got hurt, but agrees to let Sven return to the lab after he wins a round of Russian Roulette.
2	Creed	March 2, 2001; 978-4-08-873091-2	May 2, 2006; 978-1-4215-0606-7
9: "Cat's Eye"; 10: "Freedom" (じゆう, "jiyū"); 11: "Creed"; 12: "Mad Carnival"; 13: "Black Coat"; 14: "Global Revolution" (この星に革命を, "kono hoshi ni kakumei o"); 15: "Imagine Blade"; 16: "Saya Minatsuki"; 17: "Dive"; 18: "When Day Breaks..." (夜が明けて, "yo ga akete")
Train and Sven come back to Toreno's lab to finish their job, during which Train avoids using lethal force. When Eve insists she wants to be free, Toreno tries to give her a formula that will maximize her power, but is stopped by Train. During the subsequent fight, Eve is accidentally shot but her nanomachines protect her. Torneo claims the protection of Creed, but before Train can get him to reveal where Creed is, Rinslet blows up the lab with all his research and they all escape. Sven and Train decide to keep Eve with them, training her as a sweeper. They take her to a carnival, where Train is met by Shiki, a taoist working for Creed, who tells him Creed is holding Rinslet captive. Train meets Creed, who tries to force him to join his campaign to rid the world of Chronos. They duel, with Creed using his "imagine blade", an invisible sword that can change length at Creed's will. Train is forced to sacrifice his right arm to see the invisible sword before shooting Creed in the chest. After rescuing Rinslet, Train is met by "Doctor", one of Creed's allies. On Creed's orders, he reattaches Train's severed arm using Tao. Creed is injected with medical nanomachines, allowing him to gradually recover fully.
3	What the Living Can Do ikirumono ni dekiru koto (生きる物に できる事)	May 1, 2001; 978-4-08-873114-8	July 5, 2006; 978-1-4215-0607-4
19: "Sweeper Reunion" (掃除屋 再開, "soujiya saikai"); 20: "The Video"; 21: "The Target, Gyanza"; 22: "Gone Fishing"; 23: "Eye Patch" (眼帯, "gantai"); 24: "Eye on the Future"; 25: "The Princess Blew It"; 26: "No. II Bares His Fangs"; 27: "Blood"; 28: "What The Living Can Do" (生きる物に できる事, "ikirumono ni dekiru koto")
Train and Sven resume Sweeper work, along with Eve. After capturing two jewel thieves, they are met by a member of the Chrono Numbers – Chronos' elite assassin group of which Train was originally a member of. After revealing himself to be No. II, he delivers a video letter to Train. In the letter, the Mayor of a town, who is a member of Chronos and a former acquaintance of Train, asks Train to capture a serial murderer named Gyanza Rujike, who is hiding in the city. Gyanza Rujike was once captured by Sven, but has since escaped became a Taoshi. After an extended fight with Gyanza, Sven is forced to use his right eye, which allows him to see a short time into the future. Gyanza is eventually defeated, and dies due to overusing his Tao powers. No. II confronts two of Creed's allies, Kyoko and Charden. After a long fight with no clear winner, Shiki appears, and the three retreat on Creed's orders.
4	One-Day Darling ichinichi dārin (一日ダ–リン)	August 3, 2001; 978-4-08-873148-3	September 5, 2006; 978-1-4215-0608-1
29: "Sven's Graveyard Visit (Part One)"; 30: "Sven's Graveyard Visit (Part Two)"; 31: "One-Day Darling" (一日ダ–リン, ichinichi dārin); 32: "Lugart Won"; 33: "Train vs. Won"; 34: "The Treasure Stampede"; 35: "Eve vs. Flora"; 36: "Eve's Request"; 37: "Attaché Weapon Case"; 38: "After the Party..."
Sven visits the grave of Lloyd, his former partner in the International Bureau of Investigations (IBI). During his time as a member of the IBI, Sven lost his right eye when he was captured by a group of criminals. Lloyd then sacrificed himself to rescue Sven. It is revealed that Sven's right eye originally belonged to Lloyd, who had foreseen his own fate, and had registered as an eye donor prior to the incident. After Sven's visit to Lloyd's grave, Rinslet asks for Train's assistance in stealing an unknown but valuable treasure from a wealthy woman during a banquet. At the banquet, Train meets and duels with a skilled assassin named Lugart Won, whose target is the wealthy woman. Their duel is interrupted when the woman's treasure, revealed to be a Tyrannosaurus, goes on a rampage. Eve requests that the dinosaur not be killed, and with Sven's help, Train is eventually successful in stopping the dinosaur. After the incident, Lugart Won appears before Train and Rinslet.
5	Spark of Revolution kakumei no noroshi (革命の狼煙)	October 4, 2001; 978-4-08-873172-8	November 7, 2006; 978-1-4215-0609-8
39: "Naiveté" (甘い考え, "amai kangae"); 40: "The Gathering of the Apostles of the Stars" (星の使徒,集結, "hoshi no shito, shuuketsu"); 41: "Spark of Revolution" (革命の狼煙, "kakumei no noroshi"); 42: "The Summit is Destroyed, and..."; 43: "Rumors of the Black Cat" (黒猫のウワリ, "burakkukyatto no uwari"); 44: "The 13th Man"; 45: "Train & Woodney" (トレインとウドニ—, "torein to udonī"); 46: "Black Cat's Destiny"; 47: "No. I pays a Call"
Lugart asks Train why he, a legendary assassin, would protect strangers. After Train's reply, Lugart swears to challenge him again once his skills surpass Train's. Creed and his allies, known as the "Apostles of the Stars", gather in a remote island and initiate plans to destroy the global summit. Despite heavy security, the Apostles of the Stars easily decimate the security forces and kills all of the head of states attending the summit. Chronos is forced to take action, and orders No. I to use every resource possible to exterminate the Apostles of the Stars. Meanwhile, Eve challenges Train to a pursuit of a target. When they go to get information, they find that the target has already been captured by a man calling himself the Black Cat. They eventually locate him, a man named Woodney, who has been abusing the name Black Cat with a fake "13" tattoo. Because of this, Woodney finds himself facing a highly skilled adversary. Train steps in, identifying himself as Black Cat's disciple and easily defeats him. No. I and No. II pays a visit to Train, and asks him to assist in eliminating the Apostles of the Stars as a sweeper.
6	The Price of Happiness	December 24, 2001; 978-4-08-873217-6	January 2, 2007; 978-1-4215-0610-4
48: "The Mad Gunman"; 49: "Train vs. Durham"; 50: "The Duel in the Woods"; 51: "Train vs. Durham: The Showdown"; 52: "Goodbye"; 53: "Sven's Heavy Heart"; 54: "Hostage"; 55: "The Price of Happiness"; 56: "Punishment"; 57: "Charden's Doubts"
Durham, the gunman of the Apostles of the Stars, looks for Train for a duel to prove he is the superior gunman. He forcefully obtaining the location of Train's hideout, and goes to pay Train a visit. He arrives to find only Eve present, and after seriously injuring her, leaves a message for Train in Eve's blood. An enraged Train goes duel Durham, eventually defeating him after a fierce gun-battle. Eve's nanomachines rapidly heal her injuries, and she makes a full recovery. However, because of this incident, Sven decides that they cannot take Eve along with them anymore; a decision that greatly distresses Eve. Sven and Train goes after their next target, and after an extended chase, the criminal takes a child hostage. Eve comes to the rescue with her nanomachines, and together they capture the target. With the help of Train, Eve manages to convince Sven to change his decision. A beaten Durham returns to the Apostle of the Stars headquarters, and is interrogated about his independent actions. He incurs the wrath of Creed, who promptly kills him, causing Charden and Kyoko to question their roles in Creed's plans.
7	Time for Vengeance	March 4, 2002; 978-4-08-873233-6	March 6, 2007; 978-1-4215-1036-1
58: "Jenos"; 59: "VII's True Worth"; 60: "Champais Town"; 61: "The Man Who Met Saya"; 62: "The Path You Choose"; 63: "The Boy Who Fell from the Sky (Part 1)"; 64: "The Boy Who Fell from the Sky (Part 2)"; 65: "Attack"; 66: "The Black Cat in Action"; 67: "Time For Vengeance"
Chronos sends No. VII to locate Rinslet Walker. After locating her on one of her jobs, he helps her dispatch a group of thugs and escape. Meanwhile, Train's group are in the town where Train first met Saya, trying to catch a bounty. After the arrest, Train decides to have a wander around town, where he meets and talks to a man whom Saya once helped. Train follows him to his home, only to find it was a trap set up by the man to kill Train. Train is instantly surrounded, but easily dispatches all of his opponents and leaves. After a bit of training, Train's group find a boy who is being chased and shot at. Seeing Train dispatch the enemies with ease, he hires Train to avenge his father, who was murdered by the police. Train accepts the job and succeeds in infiltrating the police headquarters. After Train shoots the police chief in front of the boy, the boy begins to regret taking his revenge. Train then reveals that the bullet he used to shoot the police chief was only a paralysis bullet, and that he only took the job to teach the boy a lesson about vengeance.
8	Cerberus Strikes	June 4, 2002; 978-4-08-873271-8	May 1, 2007; 978-1-4215-1037-8
68: "Days of Youth"; 69: "Rinslet's Ordeal"; 70: "Cerberus"; 71: "The Mission Commences"; 72: "Cerberus Strikes"; 73: "The Apostles' Vicious Assault"; 74: "Enter Train"; 75: "Train Approaches"; Extra: "Stray Cat"
Train thinks back to his childhood, when he was trained to kill by the man who murdered his parents. Meanwhile, No. VII takes Rinslet to see No. I, Sephiria, who wants to hire Rinslet to help locate the base of the Apostles of the Stars. Rinslet is unable to accept that the leader of the Chronos Numbers is a weak-looking woman, and takes the job on the condition that Sephiria must resign her position. Rinslet, equipped with a transmitter, gets herself captured by the Apostles of the Stars. After receiving the location of the base, team Cerberus, consisting of No. V, VII and XI, infiltrate the base. Upon entering the base, they fight several members of the Apostles of the Stars. After a lengthy battle, team Cerberus gets past the members of the Apostle of the Stars by bringing down a column, and continue their hunt to kill Creed. On Sephiria's orders, No. X uses his mastery of disguise to trick Train into going to the Apostle of the Stars' base.
9	Showdown at the Old Castle	August 2, 2002; 978-4-08-873299-2	July 3, 2007; 978-1-4215-1038-5
76: "The Werewolf"; 77: "Nanotech Power"; 78: "Transcendent Power"; 79: "Showdown at the Old Castle"; 80: "Escape"; 81: "Imagine Blade, Level 2"; 82: "Nizer's Resolve"; 83: "The Way of the Numbers"; 84: "No. X, Shaolee"
Team Cerberus reach Creed, who unleashes a werewolf on the trio. The werewolf, a fallen sweeper who was injected with nanomachines, triggers Eve's nanomachines and causes her to faint. Train decides to go deeper into the base to locate the source. No. V fights the werewolf, and eventually manages to dispatch it despite its near-instantaneous regeneration. Using her portal ability, Echidna succeeds in seriously wounding No. V, and No. VII and XI fight the remaining members of the Apostles of the Stars. During the battle, Train appears and fires at Creed. Using a flash grenade, Train grabs Rinslet and escapes, leaving Creed stunned at Train's departure. Creed then becomes enraged, causing his Imagine Blade to transform. The base becomes unstable, and the Apostles of the Stars decide to retreat. When the doctor enquires about the absence of Charden and Kyoko, Leon informs him that they have decided to leave the Apostles of the Stars. Creed goes berserk and fights team Cerberus solo. No. V decides to sacrifice himself to defeat Creed, and eventually manages to hold Creed while No. XI fires on them at point blank range. Meanwhile, Train's group escape and run into No. X, where Train learns that he was part of Sephiria's plan to destroy the Apostles of the Stars.
10	Big Changes	October 4, 2002; 978-4-08-873329-6	September 4, 2007; 978-1-4215-1039-2
85: "A Random Encounter"; 86: "Kyoko's Crush"; 87: "Jenos's Resolve"; 88: "Cut and Run"; 89: "Creed's Doubt"; 90: "Lucifer"; 91: "Big Changes"; 92: "Dr. Tearju"; 93: "Surprise Attack"
Creed manages to survive with Echidna's help losing his left arm in the battle against the time guardians. It is reveleaded that Jenas make Belga's attack fail because he doesn't want to sacrifice a comrade; he cut off Creed's arm. Belga dies when the time guardians tried to escape crushed by the building. Naizer is unconscious in an hospital. Later, Train and company meet again with Charden and Kyoko; they left the Apostles because of how Creed treats them. Kyoko also falls for Train when he captures a thug who threatened her. When they separate, Echidna's ability makes Eve and Sven to teletransport to a church where Creed is waiting for them. Creed tries to kill Sven, but decides to implant nanomachines known as Lucifer in him instead. Trains arrives just to receive the nanomachine bullet instead. Creed escapes. Five hours later, nanomachines turn Train into a kid. The team is now after professor Tearju, Eve's creator, in order to find a solution to the problem.
11	The Promise	December 4, 2002; 978-4-08-873349-4	November 6, 2007; 978-1-4215-1040-8
94: "The Way of Master Black"; 95: "Charden's Resolve"; 96: "Wrecking Ball Room Service"; 97: "Principles of Battle"; 98: "The Promise"; 99: "Sweeper Battle"; 100: "Wavering Heart"; 101: "Feather Blade"; 102: "Angels & Devils"; 103: "Dealing with Kyoko"
As an ever-increasing headache, Train ran into Kyoko while he was out; Chronos is in hot pursuit of her and Charden, still believing them to be in the Apostles of the Stars. Train gets Kyoko to promise never to kill for the sake of killing. Charden, in the meantime interrogates the Chronos agents after him, trying to learn where the supreme leader of the organization is. When Kyoko phones Charden, he asks Train to negotiate with Chronos to protect her; he leaves to continue his battle with Chronos. They hide in an hotel, but No. IV, Kranz, and No. VIII, Baldor, arrive there and force Train and company to battle them. In the battle, Train's kid body limits his abilities. Finally, Jenos appears and stops Kranz and Baldor. Willing to listen, Jenos sets up a meeting with Sephirira for Kyoko and takes her to meet her (along with Rinslet, who fears he may try flirting with her). Reeling in pain from the strain he sustained in the fight, Train begs Sven to find the way to get him back to normal.
12	The New Weapon	March 4, 2003; 978-4-08-873395-1	January 1, 2008; 978-1-4215-1470-3
104: "Train and Sven Disagree"; 105: "Sephiria's Call"; 106: "A Heart Tested"; 107: "The Way Back"; 108: "Targeted House"; 109: "The New Apostle"; 110: "Attack! Counterattack!"; 111: "The New Weapon"; 112: "The Deadly Rail Gun"; 113: "The Ultimate Aim"
Annette argues with Sven, telling him Train knows Eve better than he does. Train tells Eve about Dr. Tearju, and she insists on meeting her in order to develop her strength. Kyoko is summoned by Sephiria but refuses to become an assassin for Chronos. While Train, Sven, and Eve find Tearju, and she tells Train how to turn back into his old self, but he can't concentrate enough to picture his adult form. While he continues to try, Tearju tells Eve that she is a clone of her just before the Apostles of the Stars led by Echidna attack. Tearju refuses to join them, but a monkey with Tao power, Eathes, copies her, including her memories and skills. When Echidna tries to kill Tearju, Sven and Eve protect her. Train, now back to normal, joins the fight using a railgun and together they beat Echidna's forces. In the aftermath, Tearju explains the Apostles believe the Ultimate Nanomachine will grant them immortality and let Creed rule the world as "God." Train, Sven, and Eve decide to stop him.
13	Dear Friend	May 1, 2003; 978-4-08-873421-7	March 4, 2008; 978-1-4215-1604-2
114: "The Time of Decision"; 115: "The Sweeper Woman"; 116: "The Price of Freedom"; 117: "Reflect Shot"; 118: "One Last Act of Courage"; 119: "Dear Friend"; 120: "To the Coffee Shop"; 121: "Man of Fists"; 122: "Flash Fists"
Train tells Eve and Sven about his grudge against Creed about Saya: After Train meets Saya, he starts to disobey Chronos orders and is imprisoned for a week with his gun taken away. Right after he was released, Creed killed Saya and disappeared. Then Train left Chronos after Hades, his gun, was returned, to seek revenge on Creed for murdering his only friend. Sven left the team to improve his foreseeing eye. meanwhile Eve and Train go to a Sweeper's cafe looking for Creed's whereabouts. River, an apparent sweeper, challenges Train to a duel against his fists, if Trains wins he will gain info about Creed.
14	Recruiting Allies!	August 4, 2003; 978-4-08-873494-1	May 6, 2008; 978-1-4215-1605-9
123: "Sweeper Vs. Sweeper"; 124: "Information Monger"; 125: "Access CD"; 126: "Nightmare City"; 127: "Exam Room"; 128: "Gathering Place"; 129: "Alliance Formed!"; 130: "Danger on the Sea!"; 131: "The Airborne Enemy!"
Train agrees to a fight with another sweeper (River) with the promise of a reward of learning the whereabouts of Creed if he wins. After doing so, he is given a video game. When he wins all the levels, he is told where to meet with all the other Sweepers who wish to learn of Creed's whereabouts. After that, all the Sweepers leave on a boat, going to Creed's island. During the last two chapters, Shiki arrives to kill two of the Sweepers, and blowing up the boat. However, the rest of the Sweepers survive to swim to Creed's island, but are separated along the way. They are now left the "mercy" of the Apostles of the Stars.
15	Eve in Battle	October 3, 2003; 978-4-08-873517-7	July 1, 2008; 978-1-4215-1606-6
132: "The First Encounter"; 133: "Let's Defy Gravity"; 134: "There is a Way"; 135: "I'll Risk My Fist!"; 136: "Engulfing Winds"; 137: "Eve's Intense Battle"; 138: "Eve in Midair"; 139: "Tornado of Death"; 140: "And the Bullet Stopped!"
Trains find River, but they are challenged by Maro and Preta Ghoul, Tao uses of gravity and corrosion respectively. Train defeats Maro with a sedative bullet in his leg and River defeats Preta Ghoul with a mach fist. In other part of the island, Eve is challenged by Leon, a child about her age with the ability to manipulate wind. However, in their battle, Eve's transformation powers are pushed to the limit when she changes in a mermaid, a metallic version of herself, and an angel; she tries not to kill him, succeeding in defeating Leon. However, she is left exhausted to the point of fainting. Elsewhere, Sven is going to be given the "cold shoulder" by another Taoist lying in wait.
16	The Truth of "Tao"	December 4, 2003; 978-4-08-873535-1	September 2, 2008; 978-1-4215-1607-3
141: "The Power of Evolution"; 142: "The Grasper Eye!"; 143: "Forceful Breakthrough!"; 144: "The True Tao!"; 145: "The Insect of Evil"; 146: "Raging Battle! The Demonic Battle Insect!"; 147: "Two Battles to the Death"; 148: "Attack! Art of Seals!"; 149: "The Truth of the Tao"
Sven's eye have improved and allow him to defeat Deek Slasky, the ice manipulator. Meanwhile Train and River reach Creed's mansion, but Shiki is waiting for them. Shiki (without his turban to contain his powers) summons a powerful insect, Setsuki, that is firstly defeated with two Railguns attacks and River's help. Setsuki is resurrected but it becomes slower, River battles it while Train confronts with Shiki, who can use other Tao powers besides summoning insects. It is revealed that 25 years ago, there was a war between Chronos and the main sect of the tao; Shiki survived the war. Finally Train wastes his last railgun attack on purpose to show Shiki he didn't intend to use it.
17	Go After Them!	March 4, 2004; 978-4-08-873574-0	November 4, 2008; 978-1-4215-1608-0
150: "The Claws of the Black Cat!"; 151: "Two Memories!"; 152: "The Power of Unity!"; 153: "Traces of a Sweeper Cafe!"; 154: "Run Through!"; 155: "Wail Warrior"; 156: "Manipulated Friends!"; 157: "Relieving Nanomachines!"; 158: "Doctor's Office"
Train defeats Shiki with a melee attack using his gun. Then he, River, Eve and Kevin success entering Creed's mansion. Inside, on an upper floor they find the others sweepers of the league, but they were injected with nano-machines making they go on rampage against Train and company. The fellow sweepers are saved by Eve's nano-machines injection. Kevin and River, who were injured, are left in care of the other sweepers. Train and Eve go to the next floor to confront the madman that made their comrades go berserk: Doctor!
18	Light of Guidance	June 4, 2004; 978-4-08-873596-2	January 6, 2009; 978-1-4215-1609-7
159: "The World of Nowhere"; 160: "The Room of Terror"; 161: "The World of Imprisonment"; 162: "Hurry to the Other Side"; 163: "Guiding Light"; 164: "Tao of Copying"; 165: "The Gauze Technique"; 166: "Clash! The White Snakes Lair"; 167: "Creed vs Sephiria"
Train and Eve are trapped in the Doctor's warp world where everything he imagines becomes reality with his Tao powers. The Doctor captures Eve and tries to dissect her while phantoms of Saya and Kyoko torment Train. However, the real Saya's spirit takes form and brings Train to Eve; he pummels Doctor unconscious. Sven join Train and Eve, while advancing they find Eites, the copy monkey but it is not match for Train. The chronos numbers make their move in the mansion and Creed is challenged by Sephira.
19	As a Bounty Hunter	August 4, 2004; 978-4-08-873640-2	March 3, 2009; 978-1-4215-2378-1
168: "Ultimate Evolution"; 169: "God's Breath"; 170: "The Final Ougi – Mekkai"; 171: "A New Threat"; 172: "The Phantom Star Brigade"; 173: "Those Who Oppose God"; 174: "As A Sweeper"; 175: "The Blade of Terror"; Black Cat Special Chapter
Sephira aims Creed's vital points but Creed now have regenerative abilities making him immortal; the only spot that won't recover is his brain. After a long battle, Sephira is defeated, meanwhile Train and company, including Eites and the chronos numbers are challenged by nano-machine soldiers in command of Echidna, known as the phantom star brigade. Train is allowed to pass in order to settle things with Creed while everyone else fight. After Train defeats Creed's phantom blade level one and level two, Creed shows his ace in the hole: Phantom Blade Level 3!!!.
20	A Carefree Tomorrow	October 4, 2004; 978-4-08-873662-4	May 5, 2009; 978-1-4215-2379-8
176: "Imagine Blade Level 3"; 177: "Black Cat's Claws"; 178: "Mixed Emotions"; 179: "Asymmetrical Warfare"; 180: "Killer Intent"; 181: "Echidna's Battle"; 182: "All He Has"; 183: "Burst Rail gun"; 184: "Conclusion"; 185: "A Carefree Tomorrow"
The Chronos numbers defeat easily the nano-machine soldiers, also Eve and Sven are able to defeat their enemies. Train use his burst bullet combined with his railgun to break the phantom blade. Because the phantom blade is connected to Creed's mind, Creed's mind also breaks and even with his regenerative abilities his mind and body have become separated; he will not be able to move his body again. Eve uses her powers to destroy Creed's nano-machines making him mortal again. In the epilogue, eight months after Clarken Island's event, Eve, Train, and Sven stop a group of escaping thieves, though Eve still hasn't gotten her sweeper license. The surviving Apostles of the Stars are shown living on, in better lives than before. However, Creed is shown to be a vegetable in Echida's care.

== See also ==
- List of Black Cat characters
- List of Black Cat episodes
