= Katsumi Chō =

Japanese voice actor (born 1951)

- Born: August 11, 1951 (age 75); Gunma, Japan
- Occupations: Actor, voice actor
- Years active: 1973–present

Katsumi Chō (長克巳, Chō Katsumi; born August 11, 1951) is a Japanese voice actor from Gunma Prefecture affiliated with the chikyu-gi.

== Filmography ==
=== Television animation ===
- Cowboy Bebop (1998) (Bartender)
- One Piece (2014) (Elizabello II)
- Subete ga F ni Naru (2015) (Suwano)
- Mobile Suit Gundam: Iron-Blooded Orphans (2015) (Nobliss Gordon)
- Rockman EXE (2002) (Dr. Wily)
- Rockman EXE Stream (2004) (Dr. Wily)
- Rockman EXE Beast (2005) (Dr. Wily)
- Rockman EXE Beast+ (2006) (Dr. Wily)
- Bamboo Blade (2007) (Tamaki's father)

Unknown date

- 009-1 (Iron Heart)
- Atashin'chi (Master)
- Buso Renkin (Doctor Butterfly / Chōno Bakushaku)
- Detective Conan (Katsuta, Master, Zenkichi Kuroiwa, Kuino Yajima, Isokichi Kamoi, Hyōgo, Yutaka Niino, Kiyotaka Okonogi)
- Crest of the Stars (Guen)
- Daphne in the Brilliant Blue (Marchin)
- D.Gray-man (Pedoro)
- Heat Guy J (Niel Olsen)
- Kage Kara Mamoru! (Feudal lord)
- Karin (Victor Sinclair)
- Lupin the Third: The Woman Called Fujiko Mine (Owl Head)
- Magical Girl Lyrical Nanoha A's (Gil Graham)
- Mobile Suit Gundam SEED Destiny (Special edition) (Unato Ema Seiran)
- Naruto (Hyūga elder)
- Naruto Shippuden (Mifune)
- Psycho-Pass (Toyohisa Senguji)
- My Bride Is a Mermaid (Nagasumi's grandfather)
- Sōkō no Strain (Barrow)
- Transformers: Armada (Unicron)
- Turn A Gundam (Dilan Heim)

=== OVA ===
- Legend of the Galactic Heroes (????) (Zauken)
- Mazinger Z Vs. The Great General of Darkness (Archduke Gorgon)
- Sentō Yōsei Yukikaze (Yazawa)
- Tekken: The Motion Picture (W.W.W.C. Director)

=== Theatrical animation ===
- Mobile Suit Gundam I (1981) (Paolo Cassius)
- The Boy and the Beast (2015)

=== Video games ===
- Final Fantasy X (2001) (Kimahri Ronso)
- Final Fantasy X-2 (2003) (Kimahri Ronso)
- Mega Man Network Transmission (2003) (Dr. Wily)
- Tales of Rebirth (2004) (Jiberl)
- Tales of the Abyss (2005) (King Ingobert the Sixth)
- Tales of the Tempest (2006) (King)
- Batman: Arkham Knight (2015) (Lucius Fox)
- Final Fantasy VII Remake (2020) (Heideggar)
- Naruto x Boruto Ultimate Ninja Storm Connections (2023), Mifune
- Final Fantasy VII Rebirth (2024) (Heideggar)

=== Tokusatsu ===
- Kamen Rider Ghost (2015) (Machinegun Ganma)

=== Dubbing ===
==== Live-action ====
- The Adventures of Greyfriars Bobby (The Lord Provost (Christopher Lee))
- Before Sunset (Bookstore Manager (Vernon Dobtcheff))
- Bend It Like Beckham (Mohaan Singh Bhamra (Anupam Kher))
- Concussion (Dr. Cyril Wecht (Albert Brooks))
- The Crimson Rivers (Dr. Bernard Chernezé (Jean-Pierre Cassel))
- Crusader (McGovern (Michael York))
- Darkest Hour (Neville Chamberlain (Ronald Pickup))
- The Duke (Clive Chives (James Doohan))
- Edge of Darkness (Bill Whitehouse (Jay O. Sanders))
- For Love of the Game (Gary Wheeler (Brian Cox))
- From the Earth to the Moon (James Irwin (Gareth Williams))
- Gloria (Ruby (George C. Scott))
- Hell Ride (The Deuce (David Carradine))
- Home Alone 3 (2019 NTV edition), (Police Captain (Baxter Harris))
- The Host (Jebediah "Jeb" Stryder (William Hurt))
- Hugo (Monsieur Labisse (Christopher Lee))
- I Am Sam (Judge Philip McNeily (Ken Jenkins))
- In Bruges (Ken (Brendan Gleeson))
- Iron Man 3 (Vice President Rodriguez (Miguel Ferrer))
- K-19: The Widowmaker (Marshal Zolentsov (Joss Ackland))
- The Legend of Tarzan (Mr. Frum (Simon Russell Beale))
- Me, Myself & Irene (Agent Boshane (Richard Jenkins))
- Misconduct (Arthur Denning (Anthony Hopkins))
- Pirates of the Caribbean: On Stranger Tides (Henry Pelham (Roger Allam))
- Royal Pains (Gen. William Collins (Bob Gunton))
- The Skulls (Martin Lombard (Christopher McDonald))
- Snowden (Ewen MacAskill (Tom Wilkinson))
- The Suicide Squad (Mateo Suárez (Joaquín Cosío))
- Team America: World Police (Spottswoode (Daran Norris))
- The Way of the Gun (Hale Chidduck (Scott Wilson))
- X-Men: First Class (Colonel Hendry (Glenn Morshower))

==== Animation ====
- Batman: The Brave and the Bold (Kanjar Ro)
- The Boondocks (Martin Luther King Jr.)
- Spider-Man: Into the Spider-Verse (Uncle Ben)
