= Strain: Strategic Armored Infantry =

Japanese anime television series

奏光のストレイン (Sōkō no Sutorein)
- Created by: Studio Fantasia
- Anime television series
- Directed by: Tetsuya Watanabe
- Produced by: Satoshi Matsui; Mariko Kusuhara; Masashi Tsukino; Hiroyuki Kitaura
- Written by: Masanao Akahoshi
- Music by: Ryō Sakai
- Studio: Studio Fantasia
- Licensed by: NA: Funimation
- Original network: WOWOW
- Original run: 1 November 2006 – 14 February 2007
- Episodes: 13
- Manga
- Written by: U.G.E.
- Published by: Fujimi Shobo
- Imprint: Dragon Comics
- Magazine: Monthly Dragon Age
- Original run: November 2006 – February 2007
- Volumes: 1

Strain: Strategic Armored Infantry (奏光のストレイン, Sōkō no Sutorein; stylized as Str.A.In.: Strategic Armored Infantry) is a mecha anime series by Happinet and Studio Fantasia. It premiered across Japan on WOWOW from November 1, 2006. A manga adaptation is being serialized in the Dragon Age magazine. The concept of the series is loosely based upon Frances Hodgson Burnett's novels, most notably A Little Princess (1905), but also Little Lord Fauntleroy (1886) and The Secret Garden (1911). The series also draws some elements from the Gundam franchise. In 2008, Texas-based licensor FUNimation Entertainment acquired the license of Strain: Strategic Armored Infantry. The anime was available in a complete DVD release on January 27, 2009, across North America.

== Synopsis ==
In the distant future (c. 6000 AD), Humans have spread across the Galaxy and have split into two factions; the Galactic Union and the Deague, which are currently at war. To allow for practical interstellar travel, both factions have developed sub-lightspeed drives, which allow ships to travel huge distances in a greatly reduced subjective time (due to Time Dilation).

The Union's strongest force is made up of mecha called Strains, short for Strategic Armored Infantry, operated by pilots called "Reasoners". In order to become a Reasoner, a potential pilot must have a Mimic, a machine fused with brain cells taken from the Reasoner before birth—thus, if the Mimic is damaged or destroyed, it cannot be replaced. The Deague do not possess Strain technology, but instead utilize swarms of small automated attack fighters called Tumors.

Sara Werec, an orphan, is the focus of the story. In Episode 1, she despairs that her older brother Ralph, who is considered the best Reasoner in the Galactic Union, has been assigned a mission that will take him 130 lightyears away to the front lines; due to time dilation, even if he does survive, Sara will have died of old age long before he could ever return home. She decides that when she grows up, she will become a Reasoner herself and join the war in order to see her brother again.

Sara grows up to be the star Reasoner of her Academy. One day, the Academy's planet is suddenly attacked by the Deague. The enemy force is headed by a powerful Strain, whom Sara attempts to engage. The pilot takes out Sara, destroying her Strain and Mimic, then obliterates the Academy and kills all of her friends. Sara escapes from her Strain alive and follows the enemy pilot into a forgotten lab near the Academy. The pilot retrieves a little girl in stasis, and Sara recognizes the pilot as her brother Ralph. She calls out to him, but he barely seems to recognize his sister as he returns to his Strain and leaves. She then resolves to find out the truth of what caused her brother's betrayal.

With her Mimic destroyed, Sara can no longer pilot a Strain, so she devotes herself to training as a "Gambee" pilot (a smaller, less maneuverable mecha) under the pseudonym "Sara Cruz". She seems to suffer from post traumatic stress disorder throughout most of the series from this point on. She becomes very quiet, allows people to bully her, responds only with stares to insults, and seems very uncomfortable around others. She is repeatedly haunted by memories of her brother, and of her dead friends. Part of her antisocial behavior seems to be a fear of losing any more people, as she did in the first episode.

At first, Sara is rejected by the other pilots. Because she no longer has a Mimic, she cannot pilot a Strain, so she is forced to join the Gambee unit. Because of her antisocial behavior, obsessive training, and talent that seems to come from nowhere, she is disliked and bullied by the other Gambee pilots. Everyone seems attracted to her both for the mystery of who she is and for their jealousy towards her.

Eventually, Sara is taken under the wing of a very talented and headstrong Reasoner named Lottie, despite the fact that Sara is not (or, to be more precise, no longer) a Reasoner. Being rejected and not quite feeling like she fits in with anyone, she spends much of her time in a storeroom filled with junk. It is in here that she finds a doll that she calls Emily. This doll, being human-like, seems to be a safe thing for her to connect with and she spends a lot of time talking to it and taking care of it (which, in turn makes her even stranger and more disliked by her crewmates).

In the same storeroom, Sara later meets childlike pilots Melchi and Carmichael, who are rebuilding a ruined Strain called Ram-Dass. Sara discovers that Melchi found a Mimic and created the Emily doll around it. When the two are ready to test the Strain, they use Emily as the Mimic and Sara as the pilot. Somehow, she is able to connect with the Strain despite the fact that it isn't "her" Mimic. Despite some initial resistance from command, she is allowed to be a Strain pilot for the army. This causes even more resentment from the other Gambee pilots, since being a Strain pilot is seen as more prestigious and it feels to them as though she cheated to get it; and also because her abilities piloting a Strain could have saved lives.

In later episodes, it is discovered that the little girl whom Ralph had taken is named Emily as well. Towards the end of the series, it is revealed that this Emily is a member of an alien race that lived 600 years ago. The race consisted of pale-skinned identical girls, all of whom shared a telepathic connection to one another. When this race was discovered by the Union, the girls were imprisoned and most were dissected to study their telepathic connection. The aliens attempted to send a rescue operation to save those of them that had been captured for research. Initially successful, some of the research survived and the Union developed Strains. Due to the time-dilation effect of sub-lightspeed travel, the Union was able to send their best and brightest Strain pilots, including Ralph, to combat the aliens. Unbeknownst to the Union pilots what had happened in the past, Ralph, after he defeats the last of the alien attacks, watches one of the pilots die in his arms, while telling him the truth about her race's fate. The collective memories of her race's mistreatment and suffering at the hands of the Union scientists is then psychically forced into Ralph's mind, causing him to a develop an uncontrollable and seemingly psychopathic determination and rage to retrieve the last Emilys, and to annihilate any humans that stand in his way. The alien's last action is to send Ralph through time to accomplish this mission.

Some, like Ralph's Emily, were put into stasis and were long-forgotten. Convinced by Ralph that the girls are valuable technological windfalls, a Deague ship, under the command of Captain Vivian Medlock, begins a campaign to acquire all of the dead and living samples of the Emilys. It is for this reason that Ralph and the Deague later chases Sara's crew and ship, because the Emily Mimic that Sara found contains the mind of one of two surviving Emilys (the other being the Emily which Ralph rescued in the first episode).

Although Ralph is seemingly allied with the Deague (and is thus considered a traitor by the Union), it later becomes clear that he is only using the Deague (and his romance with Captain Medlock) to achieve his goal, and will not hesitated to kill them should they stand in his way.

The manga serialized in Dragon Age Magazine focuses on Lottie's background, stopping once Sara joins the team.

== Characters ==
Almost every character has been adapted from a Hodgson Burnett character. Though the first names of many characters are retained from A Little Princess and the other novels, the last names are scrambled, such as Crewe=Werec, or otherwise altered, such as St. John=Johannitz.

Sara Werec (セーラ·ウィーレック, Sēra Wirekku))
Voiced by: Ayako Kawasumi (Japanese); Caitlin Glass (English)

She begins a happy, well-liked and bright girl, the star graduate student of the elite Grabera Spatial Armoured Infantry Research Institute. Her parents, James and Annie Werec, are dead and she clings to the notion of seeing her beloved brother again. However, when her friends, her teachers and her Mimic are destroyed by none other than Ralph himself, she becomes a brooding, blunt, taciturn girl reduced to piloting unremarkable Gambee units.

She appears to suffer from post-traumatic stress disorder. Despite her defeat and disgrace instigated by her traitorous brother (which she escapes by cutting her hair, renaming herself Sara Cruz and transferring to another academy) and the bullying she endures from the bitter and confused Gambee pilots, Sara is completely focused on learning the truth. Her most precious possession is a musical pendant given to her by Ralph, until it is stolen (presumably by the jealous Isabella) in episode 2, after which she finds her Emily. Soon afterwards, Sara discovers that, against all expectations, Emily allows her to pilot a Strain again and she takes control of the Ink Strain Ram-Dass. She considers Emily to be her last hope to find out the truth and hopes that Ralph will revert to the kind and loving brother he once was.

Sara's name comes from the novel's Sara Crewe.

Ralph Werec (ラルフ·ウィーレック, Rarufu Wirekku))
Voiced by: Takashi Kondō (Japanese); Robert McCollum (English)

Ralph was a dutiful soldier, the star student of Grabera Academy and the youngest person ever to pilot a Gloire Strain. Sara last saw him promising on his parents' grave not to let the family down. Six years later, he reappears in disguise with a scar on his face, having done just that and joined the Deague. He even coldly destroys Sara's home, friends and Mimic. Sara is driven by the mystery of why he has done so, and promises to face him again. Ralph's true motivation is partially out of compassion and partially from insanity.

Ralph Crewe in the novel was Sara's father, who died and his fortune disappeared; this led to Sara Crewe's ruin, as this Ralph's defection did to Sara Werec.

== Episode list ==
The gaps in the air dates are attributed to two two-week hiatuses for a tennis tournament in late December–January, and the early premiere of Rocket Girls.

No.	Title	Directed by	Written by	Original release date
1	"Prelude to Despair"; Transliteration: "Zetsubō no pureryūdo" (Japanese: 絶望の前奏曲(プレリュード))	Tōru Kitahata	Masanao Akahoshi	November 1, 2006
In a time of war, Sara Werec dreams of taking up the Union cause in their endless fight against the Deague. At the top of her academy class, she has inherited the amazing piloting skills of her legendary brother Ralph Werec, which inspires Colin, Mary and Cedie. When the Deague unleash a devastating surprise attack on her school, the three are killed in the firefight, deeply depressing Sara. She is later shocked to discover that the leader of the enemy assault is no anonymous villain.
2	"Encounter"; Transliteration: "Deai" (Japanese: 出逢い)	Makoto Nagao	Masanao Akahoshi	November 1, 2006
Sara has a new purpose to confront her treasonous brother. Enlisted at a new school, and struggling to master the less agile Gambee units, Sara wrestles with the rigors of training and the scorn of her peers, especially that of Isabella, but nothing is more grueling than dwelling on all she has lost. Sara thankfully finds something which might serve to fill the hole in her heart. Sara befriends Lottie Gelh, one who matches up to her in competition. During a descent exercise, Isabella disrupts Sara in training, but the latter ends up saving the life of the former. After losing her pendant given to her by her brother, she finds a Mimic Emily in an abandoned Strain.
3	"Sub-Light Speed Nightmare"; Transliteration: "Akōsoku no akumu" (Japanese: 亜光速の悪夢)	Osamu Sekita	Satoru Nishizono	November 8, 2006
Lottie thinks she and Sara might be kindred spirits, believing both of them to be girls lost and alone in the void between stars. Melchisedec "Melchi" and Carmichael are in the process of fixing the broken Strain. As the sub-light speed battle test begins, the Deague makes an unexpected assault, interrupting the exam. Sara, unable to participate, watches those around her get torn apart, including Isabella. Rather than sit helplessly, Sara devises a plan to utilize the Mimic Emily in order to pilot the recently reconfigured Strain.
4	"Reasoner Sara"; Transliteration: "Rīzunā sēra" (Japanese: リーズナー・セーラ)	Tarō Kubo	Masanao Akahoshi	November 15, 2006
The others are shocked as Sara rushes toward a confrontation with the feared Ralph Werec. The rage of combat gives way to confusion, as the students realize her skills as a former Reasoner. The aftermath of the attack suffers much casualties, having the Libertad to limp into space to find repair as a result. The trust between Sara and Lottie will prove to be much tougher to patch, as the latter reveals that her brother was killed by Ralph in the past. Sara is forced to transfer to the Spatial Armor Division under the supervision of Melchi and Carmichael.
5	"Endless Love and Hate"; Transliteration: "Tsukisenu onshū" (Japanese: 尽きせぬ恩讐)	Tōru Yoshida	Yasunori Yamada	November 22, 2006
If the crew is to survive the journey, new tactics must be devised to succeed against such an unpredictable enemy. The Reasoners are beginning warm up to Sara ever since she exposed herself as an adept pilot. Not everyone is so willing to shower Sara with affection, especially the Gambee pilots who resent Sara for the deaths of their comrades. Lottie summons the Reasoners to discuss a two-top battle formation, having Sara join her in the lead position. Mariette later beats up Sara, condemning her for Isabella's death. The Reasoners arrive to rescue Sara, chasing Mariette and the other Gambee pilots away.
6	"Back Turned to Peace"; Transliteration: "Yasuragi ni se o mukete" (Japanese: 安らぎに背を向けて)	Yasuhiro Matsumura	Yasunori Yamada	November 29, 2006
The Spatial Armor Division is having a party to celebrate. Dickon Cidnok convinces Carrisford "Carris" Radofrics to approach Sara and ask her to have a dance with him. Nonetheless, the gathering is about to be crashed by some uninvited guests. A team which had suffered from the willful independence of its newest member watches as Sara joins Lottie in an incredible display of Reasoner talent. This new unity might be the strongest weapon the Union has in the battle against the Deague.
7	"Lavinia's Lovely Plot"; Transliteration: "Ravinia no suteki na inbō" (Japanese: ラヴィニアの素敵な陰謀)	Yuji Moriyama	Satoru Nishizono	December 6, 2006
Sara has captured the heart of Lavinia Reberth, who goes to severe lengths to snare her new obsession. Most of her ploys end up falling short, and the heartsick girl keeps making a fool of herself in very public ways. When Sara stays behind to train while her comrades take some leave, Lavinia sees her chance for some serious bonding, but things quickly go painfully wrong when she accidentally places the Mimic Emily in the garbage storage unit.
8	"Gall Space Supply Depot"; Transliteration: "Gōru kūkan hokyū-shō" (Japanese: グォール空間補給廠)	Tōru Kitahata	Akira Tanizaki	December 13, 2006
The Mimic Emily is missing and likely in danger, so Sara and the team will have to venture out into the city to recover her, but the search is interrupted by a mysterious little girl and the arrival of a strange vessel. Even though Lottie seems very worried about the whereabouts of Sara and Carris, Jessie Ijesse seems upset that Sara would go to such lengths to search for the Mimic Emily. It is not until Sara finds the Mimic Emily in a waste collection point that she realizes that this mysterious girl happens to also be named Emily. Carris is eventually killed in battle when facing against the vessel. After all of this, none of the hearts gathered are ready to discover the real identity of Sara.
9	"Like Looking at Myself"; Transliteration: "Menomae no jibun" (Japanese: 目の前の自分)	Hiroshi Kimura	Masanao Akahoshi	December 20, 2006
Sara is suspected of treason after her ties to Ralph are exposed. The Spatial Armor Division is reeling from the revelation, especially Lottie. Her most painful wound has been ripped open once more, and if revenge against Ralph is not readily available, Lottie will settle for another with Werec blood. She moves to confront Sara, and the confrontation ends with a vow of murder. Sara explains of her relationship with Ralph as a child, ultimately promising herself to find out the answers to the drastic change in his behavior.
10	"Memories of the Future"; Transliteration: "Mirai no kioku" (Japanese: 未来の記憶)	Masahiro Takada	Satoru Nishizono	January 10, 2007
The horrible history of Emily's kind is revealed, and the shocking truth might explain Ralph's treason, but there has never been an explanation offered for Sara's ability to link with Emily. Upon closer study of the Mimic Emily, the mystery only becomes more indecipherable for Melchi and Carmichael. The lines between good and evil are beginning to blur when Sara links with the Mimic Emily to access her memories, and the true horrors of this endless war have been exposed.
11	"The Beginning of Revelry"; Transliteration: "Kyōen no makuake" (Japanese: 狂宴の幕開け)	Tetsuya Watanabe	Satoru Nishizono	January 31, 2007
Sara is certain her brother is tearing across the stars to reach the Mimic Emily. Captain Vivian Medlock, activated a self-destruct sequence on her ship, is certain that Ralph has lost his mind, forcing her to seek sanctuary with those she once vowed to kill. The final confrontation is coming, and the Strains are scrambled. The Spatial Armor Division is whole once more, as Ralph prepares to punish those responsible for crimes perpetrated against the innocent.
12	"Attack on the Libertad"; Transliteration: "Riberutaddo no kōbō" (Japanese: リベルタッドの攻防)	Yorifusa Yamaguchi	Yasunori Yamada	February 7, 2007
The Spatial Armor Division has taken flight and all the heroes of the Union must reach deep into their courage to stop Ralph Werec in his mission to punish humanity. As swarms of Strain, Gambee and Tumor clash overhead, brother and sister, meet face to face aboard the Libertad, Emily between them. Ralph injures Dickon, but Becky manages to treat his wounds. Melchi and Carmichael fail to disarm the self-destruct sequence, and Medlock is consequently killed after the security units are activated. Emily rejects Ralph's request to return with him. The last waltz of the Werec siblings is about to begin.
13	"Last Waltz"; Transliteration: "Rasuto warutsu" (Japanese: ラスト・ワルツ)	Ei Aoki	Masanao Akahoshi	February 14, 2007
Sara feels betrayed by blood, while Ralph feels betrayed by humanity. Between them waits a little girl who has felt the pains of an entire species. Ermengarde Johannitz and Martha Shobbeypower are to transfer Dickon's broken parts over to Sara's Strain. In the vast reaches of space, a war which has raged for generations comes to a climax. At the speed of light, the past and future mingle in the hopes of two girls who might never have to be alone again.

== Theme songs ==
Opening
"Message" performed by Yoko

Ending
"Umi no Opal" performed by Sema (episodes 1-8, 10-13)
"Aurora ~a ray of dawn~" performed by Yoko (episode 9)
