= Witchblade (disambiguation) =

Witchblade is an American comic book series published by Top Cow Productions.

Witchblade may also refer to:

- Witchblade (film), a 2000 American television film starring Yancy Butler that aired as a TNT Original, which was an adaptation of the comic
- Witchblade (2001 TV series), a 2001–2002 American television series starring Yancy Butler that aired on TNT, which was a follow-up to the 2000 television film
- Witchblade (2006 TV series), a 2006 Japanese animated television series based on the American comic book of the same name
- Witchblade: The Music, a 2004 compilation recording inspired by the TV series and comics
