= List of Black Cat episodes =

The cover of the first DVD compilation released by Sony Pictures Entertainment.

Black Cat is an anime series adapted from the manga of the same title by Kentaro Yabuki. First announced in May 2005, it was produced by Gonzo with directed by Shin Itagaki. The series follows the legendary assassin Train Heartnet, known as Black Cat, who becomes a bounty hunter, dubbed Sweeper.

Black Cat premiered in Japan on October 6, 2005, on Animax and Tokyo Broadcasting System (TBS), and aired for 24 episodes, ending on March 30, 2006. The first 20 episodes adapt the entirety of Yabuki's manga, while the last four episodes feature a completely original, self-contained story arc. The 15th episode was broadcast exclusively on Animax. In Japan, the series was released across twelve Region 2 DVD volumes from December 21, 2005, to November 22, 2006. Each volume was also published in a Premium Edition which included various extras. The DVD volumes were gathered in a limited release DVD boxset by Sony Pictures Entertainment on April 23, 2008.

In June 2006, Black Cat was licensed by Funimation (later Crunchyroll, LLC) for an English-language release in North America. The dubbed episodes were broadcast on Funimation Channel in 2009. The series was then released across six Region 1 DVD volumes released between December 19, 2006, and July 24, 2007. The DVDs were gathered in a boxset and released on March 18, 2008.

The music from the series was composed by Taku Iwasaki. Three pieces of theme music are used for the series: a single opening theme and two closing themes. The opening theme, titled "Daia no Hana" (ダイアの花, lit. "Diamond Flower"), is performed by Yorico. The ending themes are "Namida Boshi" (ナミダボシ, lit. "Tears of Stars") by Puppypet for the first half of the series and "Kutsuzure" (くつずれ, lit. "Blisters") by Matsuda Ryouji for the rest of the series.

== Episode list ==
Half of the episodes do not follow the manga exactly, with one episode being filler; the first seven being an alternative origin of Train meeting Saya, Sven and Eve, and the last four are an original arc called the Zero Numbers.

No.	Title	Directed by	Written by	Original release date
1	"The Solitary Cat"; Transliteration: "Kodoku na neko" (Japanese: 孤独な猫)	Yoshimichi Hirai	Shūichi Kōyama	October 6, 2005
Train Heartnet, an assassin known as the Black Cat, and a sweeper named Sven Vollfied pursue the same target without realizing it, the feared mobster and soon-to-be governor, Lib Tyrant. While Train has to do it per orders from his superior, Sven wants to earn the money from Tyrant's bounty. During a party to celebrate Tyrant's assess to governor, Sven's right eye sees that Tyrant will be killed in five minutes and tries to avoid it. However, Train easily kills Lib and Sven pursues him to ask him why he did it. Before he can, one of Tyrant's bodyguards tries to kill Train, but fails. Train spares the bodyguard, who is then killed by Train's partner. Sven discovers later on that Train is the feared Kuro Neko (Black Cat), a Chronos Number (assassin) from the organization Chronos. While remembering his parents' deaths, Train meets a girl named Saya Minatsuki on the rooftop while she is singing a song.
2	"The Hesitant Cat"; Transliteration: "Tomadō neko" (Japanese: 戸惑う猫)	Takayuki Inagaki	Shūichi Kōyama	October 13, 2005
Saya introduces herself to Train as a sweeper, and both start frequenting each other every night despite Train's cold attitude. One day, Sven meets a woman named Rinslet Walker, who hires him to rescue her "sister", Eve, a girl who was kidnapped by the weapons dealer Torneo Rudman. During one of Saya's missions, Train helps her to take down Preta Ghoul, a murderer with corrosive powers though Train questions Saya for not killing him. Afterwards, Train meets Belze and is then sent to kill Eve.
3	"The Cat in the Dark"; Transliteration: "Yami no naka no neko" (Japanese: 闇の中の猫)	Takashi Kobayashi	Saki Hasemi	October 20, 2005
Sven arrives at Torneo's mansion as Train is about to shoot Eve. Torneo's men interrupt them, forcing Sven and Train to escape. The next day, knowing that Rinslet is not Eve's older sister, Sven confronts her concerning what she really wants. Rinslet explains that Eve is a genetically engineered bio-weapon and that she wants to take the data from Torneo's experiments. Sven runs into Eve, who escaped from Torneo, at a park and befriends her. As both eat an ice cream, Eve is re-captured by Torneo and Sven decides to rescue her. That night, Train and Sven each devise a plan to attack Torneo's mansion.
4	"The Grinning Cat"; Transliteration: "Hohoemu neko" (Japanese: 微笑む猫)	Kanji Wakabayashi	Saki Hasemi	October 27, 2005
With Rinslet, Sven goes to rescue Eve. Train easily defeats most of Torneo's men, but Sven is able to get to Eve before him. As he catches up with him, Train tries to shoot Eve, but is punched by Sven who escapes with her. With Eve having decided to join Sven, Torneo activates a device planted on Eve that turns her into a monster by controlling the nanomachines inside her body. As Eve is ordered to kill Train, Sven manages to escape from Torneo's men with Rinslet's help. Sven removes the device at the cost of being stabbed. Train then destroys all of Torneo's experiments, collapsing his castle. While Sven is healing, Train once again attempts to shoot Eve but decides not to do it remembering Saya's way of life.
5	"The Departing Cat"; Transliteration: "Ketsui suru neko" (Japanese: 決意する猫)	Yoshitaka Fujimoto	Saki Hasemi	November 3, 2005
Thinking that he is being used by Chronos, Train decides to leave the organization to start a new life. Chronos sends Creed Diskenth to kill Train, but Creed is easily defeated. Creed then asks Train to join him in a revolution against Chronos which Train denies. When Train leaves, Chronos' soldiers come to stop Creed, but he kills them furiously as they interrupted his meeting with Train. Train finds Saya, gives her his gun, Hades, and thanks her for helping him to decide to leave Chronos. With Creed being unable to stop Train, a high-ranking member from Chronos, Sephiria Arks goes to confront him.
6	"The Cat Under Fire"; Transliteration: "Nerawareru neko" (Japanese: 狙われる猫)	Yoshimichi Hirai	Shūichi Kōyama	November 10, 2005
Sephiria fights Train but both are interrupted by one of Creed's comrades, Shiki, as Creed still wants to make Train become his partner. They escape when Saya's song dispels his magical insects. While returning to his house, Train starts playing with Saya who returns Hades. Saya then arranges to have a date with Train to watch the fireworks during a festival that will be celebrated the next day. Enraged with how Train is changing, Creed leaves a note in Train's house the next day, which has him running desperately to find Saya. Before the date, Saya is attacked by Creed, but is only able to stop him from killing children from the festival. Train attacks Creed before delivering the final hit on Saya, who still dies happy that she was able to see fireworks with Train.
7	"The Wounded Cat"; Transliteration: "Kizu darake no neko" (Japanese: 傷だらけの猫)	Nobuharu Kamanaka	Shūichi Kōyama	November 17, 2005
When Train, enraged by Saya's death, confronts Creed, Eve smells the blood and asks Sven to take her to its source. A week later, Train wakes up in Sven's cabin as Sven and Eve found him seriously injured during the festival. Eve still distrusts Train because of his former life as an assassin, resulting in Train telling her that she is also an assassin. After this, Eve escapes scared from the cabin and she is found by the Chronos assassin Jenos Hazard who wants to finish Train's work. Train comes to Eve's defense and helps her to knock Jenos out, who still fakes his defeat to avoid fighting. Meanwhile, Chronos changes its focus to Creed, instead of Train. The next day, Train leaves with Sven and Eve to work as a sweeper.
8	"The Sweeping Cat"; Transliteration: "Tabi suru neko" (Japanese: 旅する猫)	Masaharu Tomoda	Shūichi Kōyama	November 24, 2005
Six months have passed since Train joined Sven and Eve; the trio has problems to obtain money and Train and Sven do not allow Eve to capture a criminal by herself. Rinslet is hired by Jenos to search for a man and a girl, Charden Flamberg and Kyoko Kirisaki, who are giving criminals a Tao-laced potion. These two people meet a criminal who has killed people for destroying plants and give him a potion. Rinslet then meets Train's group and tells Sven of such criminal. Eve hears the conversation and goes alone to stop him. She finds him but both start drinking tea while Eve questions the murderers he made. The criminal goes berserk when Eve steps on a plant, and eats the potion, becoming able to control his garden. Train tries to stop him, and with Sven's help he is able to kill the criminal.
9	"The Charming Cat"; Transliteration: "Miwaku suru neko" (Japanese: 魅惑する猫)	Masayuki Matsumoto	Saki Hasemi	December 1, 2005
Rinslet goes off in pursuit of Charden and Kyoko while Train's group go after a Gyanza criminal enhanced by the power of Tao and who was arrested by Sven seven years ago. Train temporarily leaves the group in search of milk, and meets Kyoko, who falls in love with him after he saves her from a gang in the moment she was about to kill them. Train ignores her and returns to the group to prepare to capture Gyanza. Sven disguises himself as a woman to make Gyanza attack him. In the course of the fight Kyoko is involved, but she avoids all of Gyanza's attacks. By using his right eye, Sven helps Train to defeat Gyanza. Charden then comes and introduces Kyoko and himself as Apostles of the Stars, a group created by Creed.
10	"The Cat Unleashed"; Transliteration: "Bōsō suru neko" (Japanese: 暴走する猫)	Kazuki Kakuta	Shūichi Kōyama	December 8, 2005
Before escaping on a helicopter, Charden tells Train that he can meet Creed in the San Geles City. During a political gathering from such city, Creed and the Apostles of the Stars start a terrorist attack as part of their plan for a revolution. When Train finds and threatens Charden and Kyoko, Creed appears before him. Creed once again requests Train to join him, but Train tries to kill in revenge for Saya's death. All of Train's bullets are blocked by Creed's sword and when he manages to pierce a bullet through his chest, Creed easily heals his body with Tao's power. When Creed's partner Durham Glaster shoots Train, Sven receives the shot, and Creed leaves frustrated. Train protests Sven why did he get in the middle of the fight, but Sven hits him for fighting alone. Rinslet then explains to Train that Sven's best friend was a comrade from the FBI and died in a battle for protecting Sven, causing him to be afraid of losing his partner with his right eye being the one from his friend. Next day, Train and Sven make up by having a childish fight.
11	"The False Cat"; Transliteration: "Itsuwari no neko" (Japanese: 偽りの猫)	Masaaki Kumagai	Shūichi Kōyama	December 15, 2005
During a conversation, Creed tells Durham that he is no match for Train, leaving him irritated. While searching for a criminal, Train's group discovers that their target has already been captured by a man impersonating Black Cat. Eve meets such person, Woodney, and it turns out that he is using such identity to scare people who want to bother him. Still, Eve befriends Woodney and secretly defeats a trio of people wanting to defeat Black Cat before they proceed to attack Woodney. Meanwhile, Jenos finds Rinslet and requests her to stop pursuing the Apostles of the Starts though she denies doing that as she wants to find the Tao potion. When Rinslet and Sven search for Creed's group alone, Durham finds and threatens Eve to know Train's location, but Woodney tries to protect her. Train then encounters Durham and easily defeat him. Next day, with Woodney's help, Train's group make Durham tell them Creed's location.
12	"The Fighting Cat"; Transliteration: "Tatakau neko" (Japanese: 闘う猫)	Yoshimichi Hirai	Yūichirō Takeda	January 12, 2006
After having a nightmare of Saya's death, Train goes to Creed's castle. At the same time, Jenos and his partners Beluga J. Heard and Naizer Bruckheimer, locate and attack Creed's castle in order to kill him. The three Chronos' Numbers are attacked by the Apostles Kyoko, Leon Elliott and Maro, but they manage to defeat them by collapsing the ceiling. While continuing their pursuing, Charden, Echidna Parass, and Shiki confront the Numbers. Sven, Rinslet and Eve enter into Creed's castle, but Eve separates from them to rescue Leon and Rinslet and Sven are captured by "Doctor". Train gets to Creed, and both fight once again. During the fight, Creed requests Train to shoot him in his head so that he may recover his assassin nature. Train does so but Echidna blocks the bullet. Jenos enters into Creed's room, but he falls from the castle due to one of Creed's attacks. Beluga shoots the castle with his bazooka until making it collapse, making the captured Sven and Rinslet also fall. Before continuing fighting Creed, Train decides to save his friends instead of seeking revenge and Creed is ambushed by Naizer and Beluga. Later, in Sven's car, they talk about why Train saved them instead of getting revenge. Somehow he conversation leads to Saya, and Sven asks if she was Train's girlfriend. After a few seconds of thinking, he says that she was just a close friend. However, Eve doesn't think so and states that Train got dumped.
13	"The Love Cat"; Transliteration: "LOVE neko" (Japanese: LOVE猫)	Yukina Hiiro	Saki Hasemi	January 19, 2006
As punishment for his selfish actions, Durham is executed by Creed after insulting Train. This event leads Charden to question if he should continue being a member of the Apostles, wondering what Kyoko thinks of Durham's death. Both didn't like him, but think killing him is going to far; they leave the Apostles of the Star. Resuming her normal life, Kyoko hears about "Heart Day", deciding to make a chocolate sweet for Train. In the meantime, Creed has learned of their defection and decides to let Doctor Kanzaki do as he pleases with the matter; Leon suggests the Doctor use Kyoko as a test subject for the nanotech "Lucifer" bullets. Kyoko tracks Train down and attempts to give him her gift, but another Sweeper bumps into her and ruins it. Angered, she tries burning him, but is stopped by Eve and Train. Doctor soon arrives and fires the nanotach bullet at Kyoko, but Train takes it instead.
14	"The Kitty Cat"; Transliteration: "Chibi neko" (Japanese: ちび猫)	Masaharu Tomoda	Saki Hasemi	January 26, 2006
The nanotech bullet has changed Train into a young boy; making his ability to use his gun diminish greatly. Eve and Train meet Tim, Layla, Mika and other orphans, and they help them fend off a group of gangsters (with Train's murderous intent scaring the thugs off for good); Leon used to look out for them, but abandoned them in favor of the Apostles of the Star. Train's past, where his parents were killed by an assassin who raised him, is explained. Rinselt attempts to find a way to turn Train back to normal, but he reverts after a hot shower. Shiki and Doctor watch via crystal ball, noting that though disabling Train was a failure, they gained valuable data to involve the nanomachines.
15	"The Distant Cat"; Transliteration: "Toozakaru neko" (Japanese: 遠ざかる猫)	Takayuki Inagaki	Yūichirō Takeda	-
The condition of Chronos wanes as Creed reveals its existence and the corrupt nature to the world while he seeks media attention. The Numbers grow restless, and Sephiria moves in to seek answers from, and even to kill, Train. However, Sephiria is interrupted as Charden interferes and combats both; he is defeated and realizes he must choose a new path in life. Afterwards, Sephiria gives Train an orichalcum bullet to use later; seeing Train has no grievances against Chronos and not a threat.
16	"The Cat and the Lizard"; Transliteration: "Ryū o karu neko" (Japanese: 竜を狩る猫)	Hiroyuki Tsuchiya	Shūichi Kōyama	February 2, 2006
Sven looks into a sweeper alliance formed to catch Creed; unaware the latest Chronos number X is secretly behind it. Train and Eve go after a lost pet lizard, Flora. However, when they question the locals about Flora, they freak out and run for their lives. Deciding to check the sewers, the discover that Flora is actually full grown Tyrannosaurus (don't ask), but Train and his friends manage to subdue it. Due to the destruction Flora caused, Train bumbles into the Sweeper Alliance and learns of Creed's location—a small island in the Adonia Sea called Kraken—from the alliance, and heads out alone.
17	"The Napping Cat"; Transliteration: "Madoromu neko" (Japanese: まどろむ猫)	Ken Katō	Shūichi Kōyama	February 9, 2006
Train meets a woman named Saki while crossing a mountain on his way to Creed. Saki looks identical to Saya, and she lives a mysterious existence, protecting a baby prince from his enemies. Train helps her, and then he wakes up in the road with his friends there; all quite aggravated by his selfishness forcing them to chase after Train. It was all a dream, and he remembers that Saya is the reason he is the way he is now; a carefree cat.
18	"The Cat Deploys"; Transliteration: "Funade suru neko" (Japanese: 船出する猫)	Masaaki Kumagai	Saki Hasemi	February 16, 2006
The sweeper alliance gathers at a port before heading to Creed's island. It turns out the leader of the alliance is really Number X, Lin Shao Lee, and that Chronos has hired them to act as decoys. Dr. Kanzaki releases nano/Tao beasts on the city, and the sweepers defeat them. They and Chronos decide to work together and fight against Creed; the Apostles are too dangerous for in-fighting.
19	"The Sprinting Cat"; Transliteration: "Shisou no neko" (Japanese: 疾走の猫)	Masaharu Tomoda	Saki Hasemi	February 23, 2006
The sweepers and the Chronos Numbers attack Creed's Island. Though Echidna Paress causes them to get separated by bombing their ship. In the meantime, Eve runs into Leon and makes him promise to leave the Apostles of the Star should she defeat him (as his friends still need him); she succeeds in winning. Maro kamikaze kills number IX David with his gravity powers. In Creed's castle, Sepheria manages to reduce him to shreds, but his nanomachines have made him immortal and rebuild him. Train arrives without the intent to kill, with Creed realizing the version of Train he idolize is gone forever.
20	"The Cat's Showdown"; Transliteration: "Taiketsu suru neko" (Japanese: 対決する猫)	Masanori Takahashi	Yūichirō Takeda	March 2, 2006
Sephiria orders Train to dispatch Creed, but Train declines, wishing only to apprehend him as a sweeper. Outside the castle, Eve and Sven deal with a deranged Preta Ghoul, who keeps mistaking women for Saya in blind vengeance. During their battle, Train, with help from Saya's spirit, fires an orichalcum bullet into Creed's fully awakened Imagine Blade, shattering the weapon and defeating Creed. Eve disables the nanomachines within Creed, who leaves with Echidna Parass. The heroes win the battle, but it appears some of the Numbers and Apostles have betrayed them.
21	"The Drowning Cat"; Transliteration: "Oboreru neko" (Japanese: 溺れる猫)	Yoshimichi Hirai	Shūichi Kōyama	March 9, 2006
Mason, along with a few traitorous Numbers and Apostles, has formed the Zero Numbers. They have a plot that involves taking Eve to Eden, a giant experimental machine. They kidnap Eve by placing a device on her that removes her personality and makes her an unemotional weapon. Worse, the Zero Numbers' agents took out the Chronos leadership while the Numbers were busy with the Apostles; destabilizing the organization and leaving the surviving Numbers without backup.
22	"The Cat Bares Claw"; Transliteration: "Tsume o togu neko" (Japanese: 爪を研ぐ猫)	Kazuki Kakuta	Shūichi Kōyama	March 16, 2006
Mason merges Eve with the machine Eden. Eden then creates a nanomachine rain that consumes people; placing them in an endless blissful dream to end word conflict. While Rinslet finds Eve's creator Tearju Lunatique, Train gets the assistance of the remaining Numbers and the sweeper alliance, and everyone heads off to stop Eden; since the Zero Numbers are a threat only they can handle.
23	"The Cat's Paradise"; Transliteration: "Rakuen no neko" (Japanese: 楽園の猫)	Masaharu Tomoda	Shūichi Kōyama	March 23, 2006
Eden uses the consumed people to go to a more powerful, second stage. After Leon, Kyoko and Charden encounter and join them, the heroes trap Eden by luring her into a canyon using Sven and fireworks as bait; since even in the hallucination program Adam, Eve can still perceive the outside world, albeit only as the Zero Numbers wish. A battle ensues with the Zero Numbers while Train and Sven attempt to enter Eden to save Eve.
24	"The Carefree Cat"; Transliteration: "Kimama na neko" (Japanese: 気ままな猫)	Masanori Takahashi; Yoshimichi Hirai	Shūichi Kōyama	March 30, 2006
Train and Sven successfully enter Eden and fight their way through their defenses, but they meet Mason. Creed shows up to fight Mason while Train and Sven go to save Eve, but Train meets Zagine's ghost due to Eden tampering with his past memories. After some talking Train severs the link between Eve and Eden and everyone returns to their lives. The Zero Numbers also die from Eden's destruction, due to its nanomachines keeping them immortal regenerators. Rinslet is with Jenos as Sven and Eve drive off looking for Train, who disappeared after the battle; they are confident in that he will join them again eventually. Sepheria and the remaining Numbers decided to rebuild Chronos as the temporary leadership. In the end, Train walks into the streets thinking of Saya, with a smile on his face.

== See also ==
- Black Cat (manga)
- List of Black Cat chapters
- List of Black Cat characters
